= Curling at the 2022 Winter Olympics – Statistics =

Statistics for curling at the 2022 Winter Olympics.

== Percentages ==
In curling, each player is graded on their shots.

=== Men's tournament ===
Percentages by draw.

==== Lead ====
#	Curler	1	2	3	4	5	6	7	8	9	Total
1	Hammy McMillan Jr. (GBR)	83	93	98	92	91	94	88	94	94	91.6
2	Magnus Vågberg (NOR)	89	93	98	84	96	91	86	94	96	91.6
3	Geoff Walker (CAN)	95	91	91	99	85	94	89	82	93	90.8
4	Valentin Tanner (SUI)	86	79	81	96	96	95	91	88	90	89.2
5	Christoffer Sundgren (SWE)	84	81	91	95	94	79	85	93	96	88.5
6	Anton Kalalb (ROC)	89	86	81	83	86	88	94	84	100	88.1
7	John Landsteiner (USA)	83	88	93	84	80	86	93	92	88	87.5
8	Kasper Wiksten (DEN)	78	84	96	91	83	89	–	88	93	87.5
9	Xu Jingtao (CHN)	79	84	89	83	98	79	86	86	99	86.9
10	Simone Gonin (ITA)	88	92	84	85	–	81	–	–	–	85.6

==== Second ====
#	Curler	1	2	3	4	5	6	7	8	9	Total
1	Wang Zhiyu (CHN)	85	88	86	79	91	88	89	90	95	87.8
2	Bobby Lammie (GBR)	88	78	79	83	83	80	93	95	89	85.3
3	Peter de Cruz (SUI)	86	84	84	93	81	75	89	91	84	85.1
4	Rasmus Wranå (SWE)	90	84	88	89	81	95	81	74	83	84.8
5	Matt Hamilton (USA)	85	89	81	73	74	95	93	80	84	83.8
6	Brett Gallant (CAN)	78	89	90	83	93	74	88	84	61	81.9
7	Sebastiano Arman (ITA)	76	80	80	88	87	79	78	89	71	80.7
8	Markus Høiberg (NOR)	71	84	93	81	79	77	88	91	53	79.4
9	Dmitry Mironov (ROC)	83	71	78	73	83	86	82	84	58	77.7
10	Henrik Holtermann (DEN)	77	88	65	89	91	67	82	82	51	76.6

==== Third ====
#	Curler	1	2	3	4	5	6	7	8	9	Total
1	Grant Hardie (GBR)	90	78	91	90	83	81	86	96	88	86.9
2	Oskar Eriksson (SWE)	90	79	84	93	81	94	90	84	83	86.4
3	Zou Qiang (CHN)	88	88	90	81	76	91	86	85	89	86.0
4	Torger Nergård (NOR)	81	88	80	95	88	84	86	78	76	84.2
5	Mark Nichols (CAN)	75	89	83	94	90	85	80	67	71	81.4
6	Amos Mosaner (ITA)	84	78	90	83	90	76	67	79	81	81.3
7	Chris Plys (USA)	88	70	76	80	75	93	83	72	89	80.8
8	Sven Michel (SUI)	86	86	79	89	73	80	78	73	85	80.6
9	Evgeny Klimov (ROC)	81	76	80	92	88	74	69	75	79	78.7
10	Mads Nørgård (DEN)	81	71	65	76	75	91	76	63	68	74.8

==== Fourth ====
#	Curler	1	2	3	4	5	6	7	8	9	Total
1	Bruce Mouat (GBR)	90	74	95	99	94	83	93	88	85	88.5
2	Niklas Edin (SWE)	87	88	100	76	75	84	93	66	81	82.8
3	Benoît Schwarz (SUI)	76	83	81	95	72	84	69	94	88	82.7
4	Brad Gushue (CAN)	81	99	89	57	94	92	90	75	68	82.6
5	Steffen Walstad (NOR)	84	85	88	76	75	88	88	79	81	82.3
6	Ma Xiuyue (CHN)	74	68	79	89	79	88	69	88	96	81.0
7	John Shuster (USA)	81	71	93	76	81	89	75	77	83	80.7
8	Sergey Glukhov (ROC)	80	88	88	90	84	78	61	77	80	80.1
9	Joël Retornaz (ITA)	85	73	86	64	86	82	81	88	67	79.1
10	Mikkel Krause (DEN)	64	76	75	85	66	78	76	50	83	73.7

==== Alternate ====
#	Curler	1	2	3	4	5	6	7	8	9	Total
1	Marc Kennedy (CAN)	–	–	–	–	100 (2)	–	–	–	–	100.0
2	Mattia Giovanella (ITA)	–	–	–	–	92 (1)	–	78 (1)	96 (1)	78 (1)	85.8
3	Tobias Thune (DEN)	–	–	–	–	–	–	85 (1)	–	–	84.7
4	Pablo Lachat (SUI)	–	–	–	–	–	–	–	–	83 (1)	82.5
5	Colin Hufman (USA)	–	–	–	–	72 (1)	–	–	–	–	71.9

==== Team total ====
#	Team	1	2	3	4	5	6	7	8	9	Total
1	Great Britain	88	80	91	91	88	84	90	93	89	88.0
2	Sweden	88	83	91	88	83	88	87	79	86	85.7
3	China	81	82	86	83	86	86	83	87	95	85.4
4	Switzerland	84	83	81	93	81	83	82	86	86	84.5
5	Canada	82	92	88	83	91	86	87	77	73	84.4
6	Norway	81	87	90	84	84	85	87	85	77	84.4
7	United States	84	79	86	78	76	91	86	80	86	83.0
8	Italy	83	81	85	80	89	80	76	88	74	81.7
9	ROC	83	80	81	84	85	81	77	80	79	81.2
10	Denmark	75	80	75	85	79	81	80	71	73	78.1

=== Women's tournament ===
Percentages by draw.

==== Lead ====
#	Curler	1	2	3	4	5	6	7	8	9	Total
1	Yurika Yoshida (JPN)	98	85	89	86	88	96	94	84	89	89.6
2	Dawn McEwen (CAN)	85	96	99	88	94	76	94	83	91	89.3
3	Sofia Mabergs (SWE)	92	96	91	86	88	83	89	88	91	89.0
4	Ekaterina Kuzmina (ROC)	91	95	90	78	83	85	88	85	86	86.8
5	Zhang Lijun (CHN)	91	89	84	89	86	92	77 (2)	88 (2)	83 (2)	86.5
6	Tara Peterson (USA)	82	93	89	88	86	75	81	90	90	86.0
7	Melanie Barbezat (SUI)	83	86	81	86	85	84	89	96	78	85.3
8	Hailey Duff (GBR)	75	84	93	72	88	84	94	89	78	83.7
9	Kim Seon-yeong (KOR)	86	80	80	92	66	90	81	86	90	83.7
10	My Larsen (DEN)	86	88	80	79	81	74	96	81	83	82.6

==== Second ====
#	Curler	1	2	3	4	5	6	7	8	9	Total
1	Esther Neuenschwander (SUI)	81	89	86	84	97	86	68	74	83	83.1
2	Agnes Knochenhauer (SWE)	94	88	74	70	94	73	95	84	78	82.3
3	Kim Cho-hi (KOR)	80	76	88	–	84	–	83	74	86	81.4
4	Jennifer Dodds (GBR)	82	79	76	93	97	78	86	68	74	81.0
5	Yumi Suzuki (JPN)	86	79	84	66	91	75	88	76	86	80.9
6	Galina Arsenkina (ROC)	79	71	80	76	74	83	92	84	74	78.9
7	Jocelyn Peterman (CAN)	86	78	70	89	74	80	89	76	58	78.1
8	Dong Ziqi (CHN)	73	85	81	91	82	64	48 (3)	84 (3)	81 (3)	77.4
9	Denise Dupont (DEN)	90	75	86	64	86	74	80	70	67	76.9
10	Becca Hamilton (USA)	46	63	70	74	88	84	78	78	60	71.7

==== Third ====
#	Curler	1	2	3	4	5	6	7	8	9	Total
1	Vicky Wright (GBR)	80	84	76	86	83	85	83	89	68	81.5
2	Nina Roth (USA)	82	80	84	72	85	95	73	78	79	80.7
3	Kaitlyn Lawes (CAN)	74	69	85	73	85	85	81	89	77	79.7
4	Silvana Tirinzoni (SUI)	82	79	78	76	78	76	80	88	83	79.7
5	Kim Kyeong-ae (KOR)	74	76	86	85	86	81	84	65	76	79.3
6	Chinami Yoshida (JPN)	74	78	89	81	80	82	72	78	75	78.7
7	Sara McManus (SWE)	83	82	84	75	81	74	88	73	74	78.6
8	Yulia Portunova (ROC)	70	63	83	81	72	88	91	75	72	77.1
9	Wang Rui (CHN)	76	83	84	75 (4)	88 (4)	55 (4)	52 (4)	83 (4)	86 (4)	76.8
10	Mathilde Halse (DEN)	69	74	79	78	83	88	63	70	61	74.3

==== Fourth ====
#	Curler	1	2	3	4	5	6	7	8	9	Total
1	Satsuki Fujisawa (JPN)	76	88	81	89	89	71	68	80	75	80.1
2	Kim Eun-jung (KOR)	79	78	93	84	75	90	84	71	65	79.7
3	Tabitha Peterson (USA)	91	86	88	57	74	88	79	80	74	79.3
4	Anna Hasselborg (SWE)	74	71	73	66	81	89	91	84	75	78.0
5	Alina Pätz (SUI)	75	83	79	70	87	76	80	76	76	77.9
6	Eve Muirhead (GBR)	75	89	59	83	81	69	78	76	79	76.1
7	Madeleine Dupont (DEN)	83	76	83	74	75	82	66	75	56	75.0
8	Jennifer Jones (CAN)	83	66	73	65	78	87	78	68	73	74.4
9	Han Yu (CHN)	80	70	71	71 (3)	84 (3)	61 (3)	–	–	–	73.5
10	Alina Kovaleva (ROC)	80	78	79	64	53	71	86	76	72	73.0

==== Alternate ====
#	Curler	1	2	3	4	5	6	7	8	9	Total
1	Carole Howald (SUI)	–	–	–	–	–	–	–	–	91 (2)	90.6
2	Jiang Xindi (CHN)	–	–	–	–	–	–	75 (1)	83 (1)	97 (1)	85.8
3	Jasmin Lander (DEN)	–	–	–	–	–	–	–	–	83 (1)	83.3
4	Kim Yeong-mi (KOR)	–	–	–	75 (2)	–	81 (2)	–	–	–	77.6

==== Team total ====
#	Team	1	2	3	4	5	6	7	8	9	Total
1	Japan	84	82	86	81	87	81	81	79	81	82.3
2	Sweden	86	84	80	74	86	80	91	82	79	82.0
3	Switzerland	80	84	81	79	87	81	79	83	81	81.6
4	South Korea	80	78	87	84	78	86	83	74	79	80.8
5	Great Britain	78	84	76	84	87	79	85	80	75	80.6
6	Canada	82	77	82	79	83	82	85	79	75	80.4
7	China	80	82	80	81	85	68	63	84	87	79.6
8	United States	75	80	82	73	83	85	78	81	76	79.5
9	ROC	80	77	83	75	70	82	89	80	76	78.9
10	Denmark	82	78	82	73	81	79	76	74	67	77.2

=== Mixed doubles tournament ===
Percentages by draw.

==== Female ====
#	Curler	1	2	3	4	5	6	7	8	9	Total
1	Stefania Constantini (ITA)	72	82	75	91	84	80	85	67	85	79.7
2	Kristin Skaslien (NOR)	76	80	67	60	90	79	94	87	86	79.6
3	Vicky Persinger (USA)	70	77	61	81	77	71	86	80	67	74.5
4	Zuzana Paulová (CZE)	53	80	81	64	75	63	81	87	77	73.3
5	Almida de Val (SWE)	59	84	67	75	49	88	95	65	80	72.7
6	Jennifer Dodds (GBR)	61	78	78	72	59	75	73	63	88	72.1
7	Rachel Homan (CAN)	55	85	78	80	58	68	83	65	72	72.0
8	Tahli Gill (AUS)	70	69	70	69	65	56	73	77	71	69.1
9	Fan Suyuan (CHN)	75	75	72	73	63	68	63	55	60	67.3
10	Jenny Perret (SUI)	56	61	63	63	52	93	68	80	67	66.7

==== Male ====
#	Curler	1	2	3	4	5	6	7	8	9	Total
1	Magnus Nedregotten (NOR)	85	82	86	63	88	85	90	91	88	84.0
2	Bruce Mouat (GBR)	75	72	74	89	95	91	80	80	94	83.3
3	John Morris (CAN)	68	78	89	88	87	89	81	76	82	81.8
4	Amos Mosaner (ITA)	78	85	73	86	84	70	76	74	87	79.3
5	Oskar Eriksson (SWE)	57	76	86	84	78	89	86	72	78	78.2
6	Ling Zhi (CHN)	84	83	86	84	75	59	73	67	90	78.0
7	Martin Rios (SUI)	60	88	78	71	73	90	75	85	72	76.8
8	Tomáš Paul (CZE)	80	75	88	75	68	75	65	70	82	75.2
9	Chris Plys (USA)	73	55	75	76	81	76	79	81	72	74.3
10	Dean Hewitt (AUS)	75	78	54	75	78	60	83	76	81	74.1

==== Team total ====
#	Team	1	2	3	4	5	6	7	8	9	Total
1	Norway	82	81	79	62	88	83	91	89	87	82.3
2	Italy	76	84	74	88	84	74	79	71	86	79.4
3	Great Britain	69	74	76	82	81	85	78	74	91	78.9
4	Canada	63	81	84	85	77	81	82	72	78	77.9
5	Sweden	58	79	78	81	66	89	89	69	79	76.0
6	Czech Republic	69	77	85	71	71	70	71	77	80	74.5
7	United States	72	63	69	78	79	74	82	81	70	74.4
8	China	81	80	81	80	71	63	69	62	78	73.8
9	Switzerland	59	77	72	68	65	91	72	83	70	72.7
10	Australia	73	74	60	73	73	58	79	76	77	72.1
