= Hvidovre Mixed Doubles Cup =

World Curling Tour event

The Hvidovre Mixed Doubles Cup is an annual mixed doubles curling tournament on the ISS Mixed Doubles World Curling Tour. It is held annually in February at the Hvidovre Curling Club in Hvidovre, Denmark.

The purse for the event is €2,500 with the winning team receiving €1,050 and its event categorization is 100 (highest calibre is 1000).

The event has been held since 2018. It became a World Curling Tour event in 2020.

== Past champions ==
Year	Winning pair	Runner up pair	Third place	Fourth place	Purse
2018	(Denmark) Signe Schack / Mads Nørgaard	(Denmark) Jasmin Lander / Henrik Holtermann	(Denmark) Natalie Wiksten / Kasper Wiksten	(Denmark) Mona Jensen / Morten Berger	
2019	(Denmark) Jasmin Lander / Henrik Holtermann	(Denmark) Natalie Wiksten / Kasper Wiksten	(Denmark) Denise Dupont / Oliver Dupont	(Austria) Hannah Augustin / Martin Reichel	€1,000
2020	(Denmark) Jasmin Lander / Henrik Holtermann	(Denmark) Karolina Jensen / Jonathan Vilandt	(Spain) Oihane Otaegi / Mikel Unanue	(Denmark) Mona Jensen / Morten Berger	kr 10,000
2021	Event suspended				
2022	(Switzerland) Lara van Büren / Marco Klaiber	(Spain) Oihane Otaegi / Mikel Unanue	(England) Anna Fowler / Ben Fowler	(Netherlands) Vanessa Tonoli / Alexander Magan	€2,500
2023	(Denmark) Sarah Clifford / Oliver Rosenkrands Søe	(Denmark) Jasmin Lander / Henrik Holtermann	(Poland) Adela Walczak / Andrzej Augustyniak	(Denmark) Natalie Asp Wiksten / Kasper Wiksten	€2,500
2024	(Italy) Angela Romei / Simone Gonin	(Poland) Adela Walczak / Andrzej Augustyniak	(China) Yang Ying / Tian Jiafeng	(Spain) Oihane Otaegi / Mikel Unanue	€3,700
2025	(Australia) Tahli Gill / Dean Hewitt	(Denmark) Jasmin Holtermann / Henrik Holtermann	(Spain) Oihane Otaegi / Mikel Unanue	(Denmark) Katrine Schmidt / Alexander Qvist	€3,700
