= Daniel Poulsen =

Danish curler

- Curler

Team
- Curling club: Hvidovre CC, Hvidovre, Denmark
- Skip: Tobias Thune
- Third: Kasper Wiksten
- Second: Oliver Rosenkrands Søe
- Lead: Daniel Poulsen
- Alternate: Mikkel Krause

Curling career
- Member Association: Denmark
- World Championship: 1 (2022)
- European Championship: 1 (2018)
- World Junior Curling Championship: 1 (2011)
- Other appearances: 2009 European Youth Olympic Winter Festival
Medal record
Curling
Danish Men's Championship
Gold medal – first place	2020 ...

Daniel Poulsen is a Danish curler from Hvidovre Municipality.

At the national level, he is a Danish men's champion curler (2020) and a Danish junior champion curler (2011).

== Teams ==
=== Men's ===
Season	Skip	Third	Second	Lead	Alternate	Coach	Events
2008–09	Troels Harry	Michael Ebsøe	Daniel Poulsen	Nikolaj Maegaard		Carsten Blom	EYOWF 2009 (6th)
2010–11	Mads Nørgaard	Daniel Poulsen	Michael Hørmark	Nikolaj Maegaard	Alexander Behrndtz	Carsten Blom	DJCC 2011 (gold); WJCC 2011 (10th)
2017–18	Mikkel Krause	Mads Nørgaard Rasmussen	Daniel Abrahamsen	Ulrik Damm	Daniel Poulsen	Kenneth Hertsdahl	ECC 2018 (C div.) (gold)
2018–19	Daniel Poulsen	Kasper Wiksten	Tobias Engelhard Rasmussen	Daniel Munk Buchholt	Mads Nørgaard	Mikael Qvist	ЧЕ 2018 (11 место)
2018–19	Daniel Poulsen	Oliver Søe	Nikolaj Maegaard	Daniel Munk			
2019–20	Tobias Thune	Kasper Wiksten	Daniel Poulsen	Oliver Søe			DMCC 2020 (gold); ~~WCC 2020~~
2021–22	Tobias Thune	Kasper Wiksten	Oliver Rosenkrands Søe	Daniel Poulsen	Mikkel Krause	Mikael Qvist	WCC 2022 (13th)
