= 2024 World Women's Curling Championship =

2024 edition of the World Women's Curling Championship

- Host city: Sydney, Nova Scotia, Canada
- Arena: Centre 200
- Dates: March 16–24
- Attendance: 45,602
- Winner: Canada
- Curling club: Ottawa CC, Ottawa
- Skip: Rachel Homan
- Third: Tracy Fleury
- Second: Emma Miskew
- Lead: Sarah Wilkes
- Alternate: Rachelle Brown
- Coach: Don Bartlett
- Finalist: Switzerland (Silvana Tirinzoni)

The 2024 World Women's Curling Championship (45th) (branded as the 2024 BKT Tires World Women's Curling Championship for sponsorship reasons) was held March 16 to 24 at Centre 200 in Sydney, Nova Scotia, Canada. It was the first World Women's Championship held in Nova Scotia and the third held in Atlantic Canada with the 1999 and 2014 championships taking place in Saint John, New Brunswick.

The format for the Championship featured a thirteen team round robin. The top six teams qualified for the playoff round where the top two teams received a bye while the remaining four played in the qualification round to qualify for the semifinals.

== Summary ==
On Day 2, New Zealand, skipped by Jessica Smith, won their first ever game at the Women's World Championships, beating Scotland 8–6.

In Draw 11, Canada, skipped by Rachel Homan ended Switzerland's 42 game winning streak at the World Championships. Canada defeated the Swiss, who were skipped by four-time defending champion Silvana Tirinzoni, 8–5. Switzerland had not lost a game since the 2021 Worlds. The Homan rink had gone into the game on a 21 game winning streak of their own, dating back over two months.

Following their Draw 14 defeat of Turkey (skipped by Dilşat Yıldız), Canada became the first country to secure a playoff spot.

On March 21, the remaining five teams clinched playoff berths, beginning with Italy (skipped by Stefania Constantini) in Draw 15 in the morning, following a 10–2 win over Norway (Marianne Rørvik). In Draw 16 in the afternoon, Switzerland clinched a berth after beating Denmark (skipped by Madeleine Dupont) 9–1. Draw 17, played in the evening saw South Korea (Gim Eun-ji), Sweden (Anna Hasselborg) and Denmark clinch the remaining three berths.

With victories in Draw 19, Canada and Switzerland secured the top two spots and direct byes to the semifinals. In Draw 20, Italy secured third place by defeating Japan (skipped by Miyu Ueno), placing South Korea fourth, Sweden fifth and Denmark sixth.

In the playoffs, South Korea beat Sweden 6–3 and Italy downed Denmark 7–4 in the qualification games. In the semifinals, Korea lost to Canada 9–7 and Italy lost to Switzerland 6–3. The Canada–Korea game was a close affair, with Korea leading 7–6 heading into the 10th end. Canada skip Rachel Homan made a "brilliant double" on her first, which was followed by a partially missed draw by Korean skip Gim Eun-ji which Homan removed for the win. The Switzerland–Italy game was also fairly close, with Swiss last-thrower Alina Pätz having to make a double on her last rock of the game for the win. With their wins, the top two seeded teams Canada, and Switzerland would face off for the gold medal, while Korea played Italy for the bronze. It was the first time since 2018 that Canada made it to the final, while Switzerland attempted to win their fifth straight championship.

In the final, Canada started off by making some small mistakes, and were outplayed by Switzerland early on. The team were forced to one with the hammer in the first end, and second Emma Miskew rolled out of the house with a hit in the second, followed later in the end by a missed freeze-attempt by Homan, resulting in a deuce for the Swiss. After Canada was forced to another single in the third, Homan's last rock in the fourth undercurled allowing Pätz to make a double to score two, handing Switzerland a 4–2 lead. However, Pätz made two mistakes of her own in the fifth, and was heavy on both her draws, allowing Canada to score two to tie the game at 4 heading into the break. The next two ends would be blanked, which was followed by an eighth end with lots of rocks in play. Canada third Tracy Fleury made a hit and roll frozen to a rock on the button, and on her last, Homan made a hit to sit four. This forced Pätz to draw for a single to take a 5–4 lead. In the ninth end, Homan made two stellar shots. On her first, she made a "rocket double" to sit three. Pätz replied with a double of her own, resulting in Canada lying one. Homan opted to try a split on her last to score three, bringing a rock in the top 12 further into the house to out-count a Swiss rock, while rolling her shooter to out count the rock as well. Homan made the shot, giving Canada a two point lead heading into the 10th and final end. In the 10th, Switzerland conceded before throwing their last rock as they did not have any potential shots to tie the game, handing Homan and Miskew their second world championships, and giving Fleury and Canada lead Sarah Wilkes their first world titles.

South Korea won the bronze medal, after defeating Italy 6–3.

== Qualification ==
Thirteen curling federations qualified to participate in the 2024 World Women's Curling Championship. Of note, Germany failed to qualify for the championship for the first time since 2005. Estonia and New Zealand made their second appearances while Turkey qualified for their third straight Worlds.

Means of Qualification	Vacancies	Qualified
Host Nation	1	Canada
2023 Pan Continental Curling Championships	4	South Korea; Japan; United States; New Zealand
2023 European Curling Championships	8	Switzerland; Italy; Norway; Sweden; Scotland; Estonia; Denmark; Turkey
TOTAL	13	

== Teams ==
The teams were as follows:

Canada	Denmark	Estonia	Italy	Japan
Ottawa CC, Ottawa Skip: Rachel Homan; Third: Tracy Fleury; Second: Emma Miskew; Lead: Sarah Wilkes; Alternate: Rachelle Brown	Hvidovre CC, Hvidovre & Gentofte CC, Gentofte Skip: Madeleine Dupont; Third: Mathilde Halse; Second: Denise Dupont; Lead: My Larsen; Alternate: Jasmin Lander	Curling Tallinn, Tallinn Fourth: Erika Tuvike; Third: Kerli Laidsalu; Skip: Liisa Turmann; Lead: Heili Grossmann	CC Dolomiti, Cortina d'Ampezzo Skip: Stefania Constantini; Third: Elena Mathis; Second: Angela Romei; Lead: Giulia Zardini Lacedelli; Alternate: Marta Lo Deserto	Karuizawa CC, Karuizawa Skip: Miyu Ueno; Third: Asuka Kanai; Second: Junko Nishimuro; Lead: Yui Ueno; Alternate: Mone Ryokawa
New Zealand	Norway	Scotland	South Korea	Sweden
Naseby Indoor Curling Rink, Naseby Skip: Jessica Smith; Third: Courtney Smith; Second: Bridget Becker; Lead: Holly Thompson; Alternate: Natalie Thurlow	Lillehammer CC, Lillehammer Fourth: Kristin Skaslien; Skip: Marianne Rørvik; Second: Mille Haslev Nordbye; Lead: Martine Rønning; Alternate: Ingeborg Forbregd	Curl Aberdeen, Aberdeen Skip: Rebecca Morrison; Third: Jennifer Dodds; Second: Sophie Sinclair; Lead: Sophie Jackson; Alternate: Gina Aitken	Uijeongbu CC, Uijeongbu Skip: Gim Eun-ji; Third: Kim Min-ji; Second: Kim Su-ji; Lead: Seol Ye-eun; Alternate: Seol Ye-ji	Sundbybergs CK, Sundbyberg Skip: Anna Hasselborg; Third: Sara McManus; Second: Agnes Knochenhauer; Lead: Sofia Mabergs; Alternate: Johanna Heldin
Switzerland	Turkey	United States		
CC Aarau, Aarau Fourth: Alina Pätz; Skip: Silvana Tirinzoni; Second: Selina Witschonke; Lead: Carole Howald; Alternate: Stefanie Berset	Milli Piyango CA, Erzurum Skip: Dilşat Yıldız; Third: Öznur Polat; Second: İfayet Şafak Çalıkuşu; Lead: Berfin Şengül; Alternate: İclal Karaman	St. Paul CC, St. Paul Skip: Tabitha Peterson; Third: Cory Thiesse; Second: Tara Peterson; Lead: Becca Hamilton; Alternate: Vicky Persinger		

=== WCF ranking ===
Year to date World Curling Federation order of merit ranking for each team prior to the event.

Nation (Skip)	Rank	Points
Canada (Homan)	1	415.0
Switzerland (Tirinzoni)	2	370.0
South Korea (Gim)	3	330.0
Sweden (Hasselborg)	5	292.5
Italy (Constantini)	9	226.0
United States (Peterson)	15	165.9
Scotland (Morrison)	17	162.4
Norway (Rørvik)	22	135.4
Japan (Ueno)	30	108.1
Denmark (Dupont)	36	90.1
Turkey (Yıldız)	55	51.3
Estonia (Turmann)	63	44.8
New Zealand (Smith)	118	16.1

== Round robin standings ==
Final Round Robin Standings

Key
Teams to Playoffs

Country	Skip	W	L	W–L	PF	PA	EW	EL	BE	SE	S%	DSC
Canada	Rachel Homan	11	1	–	96	53	51	41	9	10	88.4%	31.70
Switzerland	Silvana Tirinzoni	10	2	2–0	89	44	50	30	7	17	89.2%	29.63
Italy	Stefania Constantini	10	2	1–1	97	61	50	43	10	9	86.1%	32.06
South Korea	Gim Eun-ji	10	2	0–2	100	59	58	41	4	17	83.5%	27.95
Sweden	Anna Hasselborg	7	5	–	78	59	52	44	12	16	87.1%	39.31
Denmark	Madeleine Dupont	6	6	1–0	73	73	44	47	4	10	78.8%	59.24
United States	Tabitha Peterson	6	6	0–1	77	85	47	47	3	11	83.1%	43.43
Scotland	Rebecca Morrison	5	7	–	59	82	39	49	11	7	81.4%	34.75
Norway	Marianne Rørvik	4	8	–	72	80	45	50	6	10	83.8%	46.83
Turkey	Dilşat Yıldız	3	9	1–0	68	94	48	53	6	8	77.9%	51.34
Japan	Miyu Ueno	3	9	0–1	64	84	42	52	6	8	77.6%	50.61
Estonia	Liisa Turmann	2	10	–	71	108	47	56	4	9	75.7%	41.14
New Zealand	Jessica Smith	1	11	–	48	110	35	54	2	5	68.4%	69.81

Round Robin Summary Table
Pos.	Country	Canada	Denmark	Estonia	Italy	Japan	New Zealand	Norway	Scotland	South Korea	Sweden	Switzerland	Turkey	United States	Record
1	Canada	—	7–4	9–4	8–7	7–2	9–2	9–4	8–2	5–6	7–6	8–5	9–5	10–6	11–1
6	Denmark	4–7	—	10–9	6–8	6–5	7–1	3–9	9–2	5–9	5–6	1–9	10–4	7–4	6–6
12	Estonia	4–9	9–10	—	4–8	4–10	10–7	8–6	8–12	6–9	5–8	3–9	6–8	4–12	2–10
3	Italy	7–8	8–6	8–4	—	10–8	11–3	10–2	8–2	10–9	6–4	2–6	7–6	10–3	10–2
11	Japan	2–7	5–6	10–4	8–10	—	8–6	8–5	2–7	4–9	3–5	3–10	4–6	7–9	3–9
13	New Zealand	2–9	1–7	7–10	3–11	6–8	—	4–11	8–6	4–12	2–8	2–10	6–9	3–9	1–11
9	Norway	4–9	9–3	6–8	2–10	5–8	11–4	—	4–6	4–7	8–7	3–6	11–5	5–7	4–8
8	Scotland	2–8	2–9	12–8	2–8	7–2	6–8	6–4	—	3–9	1–7	6–5	6–5	6–8	5–7
4	South Korea	6–5	9–5	9–6	9–10	9–4	12–4	7–4	9–3	—	7–5	4–7	10–3	9–3	10–2
5	Sweden	6–7	6–5	8–5	4–6	5–3	8–2	7–8	7–1	5–7	—	2–4	9–6	10–5	7–5
2	Switzerland	5–8	9–1	9–3	6–2	10–3	10–2	6–3	5–6	7–4	4–2	—	8–7	10–3	10–2
10	Turkey	5–9	4–10	8–6	6–7	6–4	9–6	5–11	5–6	3–10	6–9	7–8	—	4–8	3–9
7	United States	6–10	4–7	12–4	3–10	9–7	9–3	7–5	8–6	3–9	5–10	3–10	8–4	—	6–6

== Round robin results ==
All draw times are listed in Atlantic Time (UTC−03:00).

=== Draw 1 ===
Saturday, March 16, 2:00 pm

Sheet A	1	2	3	4	5	6	7	8	9	10	Final
United States (Peterson) 🔨	0	2	0	1	0	1	2	0	2	X	8
Turkey (Yıldız)	0	0	1	0	1	0	0	2	0	X	4

Sheet B	1	2	3	4	5	6	7	8	9	10	Final
Sweden (Hasselborg)	0	1	0	1	0	1	0	1	1	1	6
Canada (Homan) 🔨	2	0	2	0	1	0	2	0	0	0	7

Sheet C	1	2	3	4	5	6	7	8	9	10	Final
New Zealand (Smith)	0	1	1	0	1	0	1	0	2	0	6
Japan (Ueno) 🔨	1	0	0	1	0	2	0	3	0	1	8

Sheet D	1	2	3	4	5	6	7	8	9	10	Final
South Korea (Gim)	0	1	0	1	0	0	0	2	0	X	4
Switzerland (Tirinzoni) 🔨	1	0	2	0	1	1	1	0	1	X	7

=== Draw 2 ===
Saturday, March 16, 7:00 pm

Sheet A	1	2	3	4	5	6	7	8	9	10	Final
Italy (Constantini)	0	1	1	0	1	0	3	2	0	X	8
Estonia (Turmann) 🔨	0	0	0	2	0	1	0	0	1	X	4

Sheet B	1	2	3	4	5	6	7	8	9	10	Final
United States (Peterson) 🔨	2	0	1	0	0	0	X	X	X	X	3
Switzerland (Tirinzoni)	0	1	0	4	3	2	X	X	X	X	10

Sheet C	1	2	3	4	5	6	7	8	9	10	Final
Scotland (Morrison)	0	0	0	2	2	0	1	0	1	X	6
Norway (Rørvik) 🔨	0	0	1	0	0	2	0	1	0	X	4

Sheet D	1	2	3	4	5	6	7	8	9	10	Final
Denmark (Dupont)	0	1	0	0	1	0	1	1	0	X	4
Canada (Homan) 🔨	1	0	2	0	0	3	0	0	1	X	7

=== Draw 3 ===
Sunday, March 17, 9:00 am

Sheet A	1	2	3	4	5	6	7	8	9	10	Final
Norway (Rørvik)	0	0	4	0	1	1	0	1	0	1	8
Sweden (Hasselborg) 🔨	1	1	0	2	0	0	1	0	2	0	7

Sheet B	1	2	3	4	5	6	7	8	9	10	Final
Estonia (Turmann)	0	0	2	0	1	2	0	0	1	0	6
South Korea (Gim) 🔨	1	1	0	1	0	0	3	1	0	2	9

Sheet C	1	2	3	4	5	6	7	8	9	10	Final
Turkey (Yıldız) 🔨	0	1	0	0	1	0	1	1	0	X	4
Denmark (Dupont)	0	0	0	5	0	2	0	0	3	X	10

Sheet D	1	2	3	4	5	6	7	8	9	10	Final
Scotland (Morrison) 🔨	1	0	0	1	0	0	1	0	3	0	6
New Zealand (Smith)	0	1	2	0	0	1	0	2	0	2	8

=== Draw 4 ===
Sunday, March 17, 2:00 pm

Sheet A	1	2	3	4	5	6	7	8	9	10	Final
South Korea (Gim) 🔨	3	0	0	3	0	0	2	4	X	X	12
New Zealand (Smith)	0	1	0	0	2	1	0	0	X	X	4

Sheet B	1	2	3	4	5	6	7	8	9	10	Final
Japan (Ueno) 🔨	0	0	2	0	0	0	1	1	0	0	4
Turkey (Yıldız)	1	0	0	0	0	3	0	0	0	2	6

Sheet C	1	2	3	4	5	6	7	8	9	10	Final
Canada (Homan)	0	2	0	2	0	2	0	3	1	X	10
United States (Peterson) 🔨	2	0	1	0	1	0	2	0	0	X	6

Sheet D	1	2	3	4	5	6	7	8	9	10	Final
Sweden (Hasselborg)	0	0	0	1	0	1	1	0	1	0	4
Italy (Constantini) 🔨	0	2	0	0	1	0	0	1	0	2	6

=== Draw 5 ===
Sunday, March 17, 7:00 pm

Sheet A	1	2	3	4	5	6	7	8	9	10	Final
Denmark (Dupont) 🔨	1	0	0	1	1	2	0	0	1	0	6
Japan (Ueno)	0	0	2	0	0	0	1	1	0	1	5

Sheet B	1	2	3	4	5	6	7	8	9	10	Final
Italy (Constantini) 🔨	0	1	0	2	0	1	2	2	X	X	8
Scotland (Morrison)	1	0	0	0	1	0	0	0	X	X	2

Sheet C	1	2	3	4	5	6	7	8	9	10	Final
Switzerland (Tirinzoni) 🔨	5	1	0	2	0	1	X	X	X	X	9
Estonia (Turmann)	0	0	2	0	1	0	X	X	X	X	3

Sheet D	1	2	3	4	5	6	7	8	9	10	Final
Norway (Rørvik)	0	0	0	2	0	0	2	0	0	1	5
United States (Peterson) 🔨	1	0	2	0	0	2	0	1	1	0	7

=== Draw 6 ===
Monday, March 18, 9:00 am

Sheet A	1	2	3	4	5	6	7	8	9	10	Final
Turkey (Yıldız)	0	3	0	2	0	0	1	0	1	0	7
Switzerland (Tirinzoni) 🔨	1	0	1	0	2	2	0	1	0	1	8

Sheet B	1	2	3	4	5	6	7	8	9	10	Final
New Zealand (Smith) 🔨	0	0	0	1	0	1	X	X	X	X	2
Sweden (Hasselborg)	2	2	2	0	2	0	X	X	X	X	8

Sheet C	1	2	3	4	5	6	7	8	9	10	Final
Denmark (Dupont)	0	1	0	3	2	0	3	X	X	X	9
Scotland (Morrison) 🔨	0	0	1	0	0	1	0	X	X	X	2

=== Draw 7 ===
Monday, March 18, 2:00 pm

Sheet A	1	2	3	4	5	6	7	8	9	10	11	Final
New Zealand (Smith)	0	1	0	0	0	2	0	3	0	1	0	7
Estonia (Turmann) 🔨	1	0	0	1	2	0	1	0	2	0	3	10

Sheet B	1	2	3	4	5	6	7	8	9	10	Final
Canada (Homan) 🔨	2	0	0	2	0	2	0	3	X	X	9
Norway (Rørvik)	0	1	0	0	2	0	1	0	X	X	4

Sheet C	1	2	3	4	5	6	7	8	9	10	Final
United States (Peterson)	0	0	1	0	1	0	1	0	X	X	3
Italy (Constantini) 🔨	0	2	0	1	0	5	0	2	X	X	10

Sheet D	1	2	3	4	5	6	7	8	9	10	Final
Japan (Ueno)	0	0	0	2	0	0	2	0	0	X	4
South Korea (Gim) 🔨	0	4	1	0	1	1	0	1	1	X	9

=== Draw 8 ===
Monday, March 18, 7:00 pm

Sheet A	1	2	3	4	5	6	7	8	9	10	Final
Scotland (Morrison) 🔨	0	0	0	0	1	0	X	X	X	X	1
Sweden (Hasselborg)	1	3	2	1	0	1	X	X	X	X	8

Sheet B	1	2	3	4	5	6	7	8	9	10	Final
Switzerland (Tirinzoni)	0	2	2	0	0	3	0	3	X	X	10
Japan (Ueno) 🔨	1	0	0	1	0	0	1	0	X	X	3

Sheet C	1	2	3	4	5	6	7	8	9	10	Final
Norway (Rørvik)	2	2	0	1	0	1	0	4	1	X	11
Turkey (Yıldız) 🔨	0	0	1	0	2	0	2	0	0	X	5

Sheet D	1	2	3	4	5	6	7	8	9	10	Final
Estonia (Turmann)	1	0	2	1	1	0	2	0	2	0	9
Denmark (Dupont) 🔨	0	2	0	0	0	3	0	2	0	3	10

=== Draw 9 ===
Tuesday, March 19, 9:00 am

Sheet B	1	2	3	4	5	6	7	8	9	10	Final
Sweden (Hasselborg)	0	0	1	0	4	1	0	1	0	2	9
Turkey (Yıldız) 🔨	1	0	0	1	0	0	2	0	2	0	6

Sheet C	1	2	3	4	5	6	7	8	9	10	Final
South Korea (Gim) 🔨	0	2	0	1	0	0	3	1	2	X	9
Scotland (Morrison)	0	0	1	0	0	2	0	0	0	X	3

Sheet D	1	2	3	4	5	6	7	8	9	10	11	Final
Italy (Constantini) 🔨	2	0	0	0	2	0	0	2	0	1	0	7
Canada (Homan)	0	2	0	1	0	2	1	0	1	0	1	8

=== Draw 10 ===
Tuesday, March 19, 2:00 pm

Sheet A	1	2	3	4	5	6	7	8	9	10	Final
Estonia (Turmann) 🔨	1	0	0	1	0	2	0	X	X	X	4
Japan (Ueno)	0	2	1	0	2	0	5	X	X	X	10

Sheet B	1	2	3	4	5	6	7	8	9	10	Final
Denmark (Dupont) 🔨	1	0	1	1	0	0	2	2	0	X	7
United States (Peterson)	0	2	0	0	0	1	0	0	1	X	4

Sheet C	1	2	3	4	5	6	7	8	9	10	Final
Italy (Constantini) 🔨	1	3	0	4	0	3	X	X	X	X	11
New Zealand (Smith)	0	0	1	0	2	0	X	X	X	X	3

Sheet D	1	2	3	4	5	6	7	8	9	10	Final
Switzerland (Tirinzoni)	1	0	0	2	1	0	1	0	1	X	6
Norway (Rørvik) 🔨	0	0	1	0	0	1	0	1	0	X	3

=== Draw 11 ===
Tuesday, March 19, 7:00 pm

Sheet A	1	2	3	4	5	6	7	8	9	10	Final
Canada (Homan) 🔨	0	2	0	0	2	0	4	0	X	X	8
Switzerland (Tirinzoni)	0	0	2	0	0	2	0	1	X	X	5

Sheet B	1	2	3	4	5	6	7	8	9	10	Final
Scotland (Morrison)	0	2	0	1	1	0	3	0	3	2	12
Estonia (Turmann) 🔨	2	0	2	0	0	2	0	2	0	0	8

Sheet C	1	2	3	4	5	6	7	8	9	10	11	Final
Sweden (Hasselborg)	1	0	1	0	0	0	1	0	2	0	1	6
Denmark (Dupont) 🔨	0	1	0	0	2	0	0	1	0	1	0	5

Sheet D	1	2	3	4	5	6	7	8	9	10	Final
Turkey (Yıldız)	0	0	1	1	0	0	0	1	0	X	3
South Korea (Gim) 🔨	2	0	0	0	2	2	1	0	3	X	10

=== Draw 12 ===
Wednesday, March 20, 9:00 am

Sheet A	1	2	3	4	5	6	7	8	9	10	Final
Norway (Rørvik)	0	0	2	1	0	3	5	X	X	X	11
New Zealand (Smith) 🔨	2	1	0	0	1	0	0	X	X	X	4

Sheet B	1	2	3	4	5	6	7	8	9	10	Final
South Korea (Gim)	0	0	2	0	2	0	4	0	1	0	9
Italy (Constantini) 🔨	0	3	0	2	0	2	0	2	0	1	10

Sheet C	1	2	3	4	5	6	7	8	9	10	Final
Japan (Ueno)	0	0	0	1	0	0	1	0	0	X	2
Canada (Homan) 🔨	1	0	1	0	0	1	0	3	1	X	7

Sheet D	1	2	3	4	5	6	7	8	9	10	Final
United States (Peterson)	0	1	0	1	0	1	1	1	0	X	5
Sweden (Hasselborg) 🔨	4	0	2	0	2	0	0	0	2	X	10

=== Draw 13 ===
Wednesday, March 20, 2:00 pm

Sheet A	1	2	3	4	5	6	7	8	9	10	Final
Denmark (Dupont)	0	0	1	0	1	0	1	0	3	0	6
Italy (Constantini) 🔨	0	3	0	1	0	2	0	1	0	1	8

Sheet B	1	2	3	4	5	6	7	8	9	10	Final
Norway (Rørvik) 🔨	0	1	0	2	0	0	0	1	1	0	5
Japan (Ueno)	1	0	1	0	3	1	1	0	0	1	8

Sheet C	1	2	3	4	5	6	7	8	9	10	Final
Estonia (Turmann) 🔨	0	1	0	2	0	2	0	1	0	0	6
Turkey (Yıldız)	1	0	1	0	1	0	1	0	3	1	8

Sheet D	1	2	3	4	5	6	7	8	9	10	11	Final
Switzerland (Tirinzoni) 🔨	0	0	2	0	2	0	0	0	0	1	0	5
Scotland (Morrison)	0	1	0	1	0	0	0	3	0	0	1	6

=== Draw 14 ===
Wednesday, March 20, 7:00 pm

Sheet A	1	2	3	4	5	6	7	8	9	10	Final
Sweden (Hasselborg)	0	0	0	2	0	1	1	0	1	0	5
South Korea (Gim) 🔨	1	0	0	0	2	0	0	2	0	2	7

Sheet B	1	2	3	4	5	6	7	8	9	10	Final
Turkey (Yıldız)	0	0	0	1	0	0	3	0	1	0	5
Canada (Homan) 🔨	0	2	0	0	0	1	0	1	0	5	9

Sheet C	1	2	3	4	5	6	7	8	9	10	Final
Scotland (Morrison) 🔨	0	0	3	0	1	0	1	0	1	0	6
United States (Peterson)	0	3	0	1	0	2	0	1	0	1	8

Sheet D	1	2	3	4	5	6	7	8	9	10	Final
New Zealand (Smith)	0	0	0	0	0	1	0	X	X	X	1
Denmark (Dupont) 🔨	1	2	1	0	2	0	1	X	X	X	7

=== Draw 15 ===
Thursday, March 21, 9:00 am

Sheet A	1	2	3	4	5	6	7	8	9	10	Final
Japan (Ueno) 🔨	2	0	1	0	2	0	0	0	2	0	7
United States (Peterson)	0	1	0	4	0	2	0	0	0	2	9

Sheet B	1	2	3	4	5	6	7	8	9	10	Final
Switzerland (Tirinzoni) 🔨	4	1	1	0	4	0	X	X	X	X	10
New Zealand (Smith)	0	0	0	1	0	1	X	X	X	X	2

Sheet C	1	2	3	4	5	6	7	8	9	10	Final
Italy (Constantini) 🔨	0	4	0	5	0	1	X	X	X	X	10
Norway (Rørvik)	0	0	1	0	1	0	X	X	X	X	2

Sheet D	1	2	3	4	5	6	7	8	9	10	Final
Canada (Homan)	3	4	1	0	1	0	X	X	X	X	9
Estonia (Turmann) 🔨	0	0	0	2	0	2	X	X	X	X	4

=== Draw 16 ===
Thursday, March 21, 2:00 pm

Sheet A	1	2	3	4	5	6	7	8	9	10	Final
Turkey (Yıldız)	0	0	1	0	0	1	0	2	0	1	5
Scotland (Morrison) 🔨	0	2	0	0	2	0	1	0	1	0	6

Sheet B	1	2	3	4	5	6	7	8	9	10	Final
Estonia (Turmann)	0	0	1	1	0	1	0	1	1	0	5
Sweden (Hasselborg) 🔨	2	1	0	0	2	0	1	0	0	2	8

Sheet C	1	2	3	4	5	6	7	8	9	10	Final
Denmark (Dupont)	0	0	0	0	1	0	0	X	X	X	1
Switzerland (Tirinzoni) 🔨	0	0	2	1	0	1	5	X	X	X	9

Sheet D	1	2	3	4	5	6	7	8	9	10	Final
South Korea (Gim)	0	0	2	1	1	1	0	2	0	X	7
Norway (Rørvik) 🔨	0	2	0	0	0	0	1	0	1	X	4

=== Draw 17 ===
Thursday, March 21, 7:00 pm

Sheet A	1	2	3	4	5	6	7	8	9	10	Final
New Zealand (Smith)	0	0	1	0	0	1	0	0	X	X	2
Canada (Homan) 🔨	2	1	0	0	1	0	0	5	X	X	9

Sheet B	1	2	3	4	5	6	7	8	9	10	Final
United States (Peterson)	0	0	0	0	2	0	1	0	X	X	3
South Korea (Gim) 🔨	2	1	2	1	0	1	0	2	X	X	9

Sheet C	1	2	3	4	5	6	7	8	9	10	Final
Japan (Ueno) 🔨	1	0	0	0	0	0	0	1	0	1	3
Sweden (Hasselborg)	0	0	0	0	1	0	2	0	2	0	5

Sheet D	1	2	3	4	5	6	7	8	9	10	Final
Italy (Constantini) 🔨	0	1	0	1	0	2	0	3	0	0	7
Turkey (Yıldız)	0	0	2	0	1	0	1	0	1	1	6

=== Draw 18 ===
Friday, March 22, 9:00 am

Sheet A	1	2	3	4	5	6	7	8	9	10	Final
Switzerland (Tirinzoni)	0	0	2	1	0	0	0	1	2	X	6
Italy (Constantini) 🔨	0	0	0	0	2	0	0	0	0	X	2

Sheet B	1	2	3	4	5	6	7	8	9	10	Final
Norway (Rørvik) 🔨	0	2	0	3	2	0	1	1	X	X	9
Denmark (Dupont)	0	0	1	0	0	2	0	0	X	X	3

Sheet C	1	2	3	4	5	6	7	8	9	10	Final
United States (Peterson)	0	2	3	0	0	2	0	1	4	X	12
Estonia (Turmann) 🔨	0	0	0	1	2	0	1	0	0	X	4

Sheet D	1	2	3	4	5	6	7	8	9	10	Final
Scotland (Morrison) 🔨	0	0	0	1	3	0	0	2	1	X	7
Japan (Ueno)	0	0	0	0	0	1	1	0	0	X	2

=== Draw 19 ===
Friday, March 22, 2:00 pm

Sheet A	1	2	3	4	5	6	7	8	9	10	Final
South Korea (Gim) 🔨	0	1	0	0	2	0	4	0	2	X	9
Denmark (Dupont)	0	0	0	2	0	1	0	2	0	X	5

Sheet B	1	2	3	4	5	6	7	8	9	10	Final
Canada (Homan) 🔨	0	3	0	1	2	0	2	X	X	X	8
Scotland (Morrison)	0	0	1	0	0	1	0	X	X	X	2

Sheet C	1	2	3	4	5	6	7	8	9	10	Final
Turkey (Yıldız) 🔨	2	1	0	1	0	3	1	0	0	1	9
New Zealand (Smith)	0	0	1	0	3	0	0	1	1	0	6

Sheet D	1	2	3	4	5	6	7	8	9	10	Final
Sweden (Hasselborg) 🔨	1	0	0	0	0	0	0	1	0	X	2
Switzerland (Tirinzoni)	0	2	0	0	1	0	0	0	1	X	4

=== Draw 20 ===
Friday, March 22, 7:00 pm

Sheet A	1	2	3	4	5	6	7	8	9	10	Final
Estonia (Turmann) 🔨	0	1	0	3	0	0	1	2	0	1	8
Norway (Rørvik)	0	0	2	0	1	1	0	0	2	0	6

Sheet B	1	2	3	4	5	6	7	8	9	10	11	Final
Japan (Ueno)	0	0	2	1	0	4	0	0	1	0	0	8
Italy (Constantini) 🔨	0	2	0	0	2	0	1	1	0	2	2	10

Sheet C	1	2	3	4	5	6	7	8	9	10	Final
Canada (Homan)	0	2	0	1	0	1	0	0	1	0	5
South Korea (Gim) 🔨	1	0	1	0	1	0	1	1	0	1	6

Sheet D	1	2	3	4	5	6	7	8	9	10	Final
New Zealand (Smith)	0	1	0	0	0	2	X	X	X	X	3
United States (Peterson) 🔨	2	0	3	2	2	0	X	X	X	X	9

== Playoffs ==
Qualification games
4	South Korea	6
5	Sweden	3
3	Italy	7
6	Denmark	4

Semifinals
1	Canada	9
4	South Korea	7
2	Switzerland	6
3	Italy	3

Final
1	Canada	7
2	Switzerland	5
Bronze medal game
4	South Korea	6
3	Italy	3

=== Qualification Games ===
Saturday, March 23, 11:00 am

Sheet B	1	2	3	4	5	6	7	8	9	10	Final
Italy (Constantini) 🔨	0	1	0	2	0	1	2	1	0	X	7
Denmark (Dupont)	0	0	1	0	2	0	0	0	1	X	4

Player percentages
Italy		Denmark	
Giulia Zardini Lacedelli	94%	My Larsen	89%
Angela Romei	83%	Denise Dupont	71%
Elena Mathis	91%	Mathilde Halse	75%
Stefania Constantini	76%	Madeleine Dupont	80%
Total	86%	Total	79%

Sheet D	1	2	3	4	5	6	7	8	9	10	Final
South Korea (Gim) 🔨	0	2	0	0	0	0	1	0	2	1	6
Sweden (Hasselborg)	1	0	0	1	0	0	0	1	0	0	3

Player percentages
South Korea		Sweden	
Seol Ye-eun	89%	Sofia Mabergs	90%
Kim Su-ji	85%	Agnes Knochenhauer	90%
Kim Min-ji	85%	Sara McManus	76%
Gim Eun-ji	76%	Anna Hasselborg	81%
Total	84%	Total	84%

=== Semifinals ===
Saturday, March 23, 5:00 pm

Sheet B	1	2	3	4	5	6	7	8	9	10	Final
Canada (Homan) 🔨	0	2	0	1	0	1	0	2	0	3	9
South Korea (Gim)	0	0	3	0	1	0	1	0	2	0	7

Player percentages
Canada		South Korea	
Sarah Wilkes	99%	Seol Ye-eun	98%
Emma Miskew	94%	Kim Su-ji	78%
Tracy Fleury	84%	Kim Min-ji	78%
Rachel Homan	89%	Gim Eun-ji	75%
Total	91%	Total	82%

Sheet D	1	2	3	4	5	6	7	8	9	10	Final
Switzerland (Tirinzoni) 🔨	0	1	0	1	0	0	2	0	0	2	6
Italy (Constantini)	0	0	1	0	1	0	0	0	1	0	3

Player percentages
Switzerland		Italy	
Carole Howald	93%	Giulia Zardini Lacedelli	86%
Selina Witschonke	84%	Angela Romei	66%
Silvana Tirinzoni	83%	Elena Mathis	83%
Alina Pätz	97%	Stefania Constantini	88%
Total	89%	Total	81%

=== Bronze medal game ===
Sunday, March 24, 11:00 am

Sheet C	1	2	3	4	5	6	7	8	9	10	Final
South Korea (Gim)	0	0	0	1	0	2	0	0	0	3	6
Italy (Constantini) 🔨	0	1	0	0	1	0	0	1	0	0	3

Player percentages
South Korea		Italy	
Seol Ye-eun	87%	Giulia Zardini Lacedelli	92%
Kim Su-ji	84%	Angela Romei	87%
Kim Min-ji	81%	Elena Mathis	79%
Gim Eun-ji	80%	Stefania Constantini	85%
Total	83%	Total	86%

=== Final ===
Sunday, March 24, 5:00 pm

Sheet C	1	2	3	4	5	6	7	8	9	10	Final
Canada (Homan) 🔨	1	0	1	0	2	0	0	0	3	X	7
Switzerland (Tirinzoni)	0	2	0	2	0	0	0	1	0	X	5

Player percentages
Canada		Switzerland	
Sarah Wilkes	95%	Carole Howald	94%
Emma Miskew	78%	Selina Witschonke	88%
Tracy Fleury	84%	Silvana Tirinzoni	80%
Rachel Homan	88%	Alina Pätz	88%
Total	86%	Total	87%

== Statistics ==
=== Player percentages ===
Final Round Robin Percentages

Key
All-Star Team

Leads	%
(Switzerland) Carole Howald	93.5
(Italy) Giulia Zardini Lacedelli	92.4
(Norway) Martine Rønning	91.1
(Canada) Sarah Wilkes	90.8
(Sweden) Sofia Mabergs	90.2
(Scotland) Sophie Jackson	88.7
(Japan) Yui Ueno	88.4
(South Korea) Seol Ye-eun	87.3
(United States) Becca Hamilton	85.4
(Turkey) Berfin Şengül	84.9
(Estonia) Heili Grossmann	83.4
(Denmark) My Larsen	80.4
(New Zealand) Holly Thompson	78.0

Seconds	%
(Canada) Emma Miskew	88.6
(Italy) Angela Romei	87.1
(Switzerland) Selina Witschonke	87.0
(United States) Tara Peterson	86.1
(Norway) Mille Haslev Nordbye	85.9
(Sweden) Agnes Knochenhauer	84.6
(South Korea) Kim Su-ji	84.4
(Denmark) Jasmin Lander (Note: Played in eight games)	81.6
(Scotland) Sophie Sinclair	81.1
(Denmark) Denise Dupont (Note: Includes three games throwing lead rocks)	80.2
(Japan) Junko Nishimuro	76.4
(Estonia) Liisa Turmann (Skip)	75.5
(Turkey) İfayet Şafak Çalıkuşu	74.7
(New Zealand) Bridget Becker	64.9

Thirds	%
(Sweden) Sara McManus	88.8
(Switzerland) Silvana Tirinzoni (Skip)	88.3
(Canada) Tracy Fleury	85.7
(United States) Cory Thiesse	83.3
(Norway) Marianne Rørvik (Skip)	82.9
(South Korea) Kim Min-ji	81.5
(Scotland) Jennifer Dodds	81.2
(Denmark) Mathilde Halse	80.9
(Italy) Elena Mathis	79.9
(Turkey) Öznur Polat	77.4
(Estonia) Kerli Laidsalu	77.4
(Japan) Asuka Kanai	76.0
(New Zealand) Courtney Smith	65.7

Skips	%
(Canada) Rachel Homan	88.6
(Switzerland) Alina Pätz (Fourth)	88.4
(Italy) Stefania Constantini	85.1
(Sweden) Anna Hasselborg	84.7
(South Korea) Gim Eun-ji	80.7
(United States) Tabitha Peterson	77.0
(Turkey) Dilşat Yıldız	75.4
(Norway) Kristin Skaslien (Fourth)	75.4
(Scotland) Rebecca Morrison	74.6
(Denmark) Madeleine Dupont	72.7
(Japan) Miyu Ueno	67.6
(Estonia) Erika Tuvike (Fourth)	66.3
(New Zealand) Jessica Smith	63.2

=== Perfect games ===
Minimum 10 shots thrown

Player	Team	Position	Shots	Opponent
Alina Pätz	Switzerland	Fourth	16	Japan
Martine Rønning	Norway	Lead	14	New Zealand
Martine Rønning	Norway	Lead	12	Italy
Carole Howald	Switzerland	Lead	11	New Zealand

== Awards ==
The awards and all-star team are as follows:

All-Star Team

- Fourth: Rachel Homan, Canada
- Third: Sara McManus, Sweden
- Second: Emma Miskew, Canada
- Lead: Carole Howald, Switzerland

Frances Brodie Sportsmanship Award

- Angela Romei, Italy

== Final standings ==
Place	Team
1st place, gold medalist(s)	Canada
2nd place, silver medalist(s)	Switzerland
3rd place, bronze medalist(s)	South Korea
4	Italy
5	Sweden
6	Denmark
7	United States
8	Scotland
9	Norway
10	Turkey
11	Japan
12	Estonia
13	New Zealand

== National playdowns ==
- (Canada) 2024 Scotties Tournament of Hearts
- 2024 Japan Curling Championships
- (South Korea) 2023 Korean Curling Championships
- 2024 United States Women's Curling Championship
