= 2022 World Women's Curling Championship =

- Host city: Prince George, British Columbia, Canada
- Arena: CN Centre
- Dates: March 19–27
- Attendance: 34,773
- Winner: Switzerland
- Curling club: CC Aarau, Aarau & Bern CC, Bern
- Skip: Silvana Tirinzoni
- Fourth: Alina Pätz
- Second: Esther Neuenschwander
- Lead: Melanie Barbezat
- Alternate: Carole Howald
- Coach: Pierre Charette
- Finalist: South Korea (Kim)

The 2022 World Women's Curling Championship (branded as the 2022 BKT Tires & OK Tire World Women's Curling Championship for sponsorship reasons) was held from March 19 to 27 at the CN Centre in Prince George, British Columbia, Canada. Prince George was originally chosen to host the 2020 World Women's Curling Championship, but the event was cancelled due to the COVID-19 pandemic.

The format for the Championship returned to a 13 team round robin opposed to the 14 teams qualified for the 2021 World Women's Curling Championship. The top six teams qualified for the playoff round, where the top two teams received a bye while the remaining four played the first round. The no-tick rule was used for the first time at a World Championship tournament.

Scotland and Japan were forced to withdraw from the tournament due to COVID-19 issues within their teams. The Russian Curling Federation was disqualified from the tournament as a sanction for the 2022 Russian invasion of Ukraine; the Czech Republic accepted an invitation to replace them. The championship was won by the Switzerland team skipped by Silvana Tirinzoni.

== Qualification ==
Thirteen curling federations qualified to participate in the 2022 World Women's Curling Championship. This was the first World Women's Championship appearance for Turkey, who was represented by skip Dilşat Yıldız.

Means of qualification	Vacancies	Qualified
Host nation	1	Canada
Americas	1	United States
2021 European Curling Championships	~~7~~ 6	Scotland; Sweden; Germany; ~~RCF~~; Switzerland; Italy; Turkey
2021 Pacific-Asia Curling Championships	2	Japan; South Korea
2022 World Qualification Event	2	Denmark; Norway
Emergency Ruling Replacement	1	Czech Republic
TOTAL	13	

=== Russian participation ===
As part of international sports' reaction to the Russian invasion of Ukraine, on February 28 the World Curling Federation initiated proceedings to remove the Russian Curling Federation from the 2022 Curling Championship, pending until March 3. In its statement the WCF said:

The World Curling Federation strongly condemns the military action undertaken by the Russian Government in their invasion of Ukraine and continues to hope for a swift and peaceful resolution to the situation.

On March 4, 2022, the WCF announced the removal of the RCF from the 2022 World Curling Championships. Their vacated spot was offered to the next best-placed teams in the World Qualifying event, first Latvia, then Finland, neither of which were able to compete. It was then offered to the next highest ranked team not already represented; the Czech Republic accepted entry into the tournament.

=== COVID-19 issues ===
==== Scotland ====
Prior to the event, Scottish skip Rebecca Morrison and alternate Fay Henderson tested positive for COVID-19, so the team brought new alternate Beth Farmer, a shepherd from the Kinross area who was in the middle of lambing season, to play lead. However, after additional positive tests by other team members, the Scottish team was forced to withdraw from the remainder of the tournament.

==== Japan ====
Two members of the Japanese team (third Seina Nakajima and alternate Chiaki Matsumura) did not play in their penultimate game against Switzerland due to a COVID-19 outbreak on their team, forcing them to play with three players. Despite the remaining three players on the team testing negative, the team decided to forfeit their final game against South Korea.

== Teams ==
The teams were as follows:

Canada	Czech Republic	Denmark	Germany	Italy
Gimli CC, Gimli Skip: Kerri Einarson; Third: Val Sweeting; Second: Shannon Birchard; Lead: Briane Meilleur; Alternate: Krysten Karwacki	CC Sokol Liboc, Prague Skip: Alžběta Baudyšová; Third: Petra Vinšová; Second: Michaela Baudyšová; Lead: Klára Svatoňová; Alternate: Lenka Hronová	Hvidovre CC, Hvidovre & Gentofte CC, Gentofte Skip: Madeleine Dupont; Third: Mathilde Halse; Second: Denise Dupont; Lead: My Larsen; Alternate: Jasmin Lander	CC Füssen, Füssen Skip: Daniela Jentsch; Third: Emira Abbes; Second: Mia Höhne; Lead: Analena Jentsch; Alternate: Klara-Hermine Fomm	Curling Pinerolo ASD, Pinerolo, ASD Milano CC, Milan, CC Dolomiti, Cortina d'Ampezzo & CC Lago Santo, Trento Skip: Stefania Constantini; Third: Marta Lo Deserto; Second: Angela Romei; Lead: Veronica Zappone; Alternate: Giulia Zardini Lacedelli
Japan	Norway	Scotland	South Korea	Sweden
Karuizawa CC, Karuizawa Skip: Ikue Kitazawa; Third: Seina Nakajima; Second: Minori Suzuki; Lead: Hasumi Ishigooka; Alternate: Chiaki Matsumura	Lillehammer CC, Lillehammer Fourth: Kristin Skaslien; Skip: Marianne Rørvik; Second: Mille Haslev Nordbye; Lead: Martine Rønning; Alternate: Eirin Mesloe	Curl Aberdeen, Aberdeen Skip: Rebecca Morrison; Third: Gina Aitken; Second: Sophie Sinclair; Lead: Sophie Jackson; Alternate: Fay Henderson, Beth Farmer (Note: After Rebecca Morrison and Fay Henderson both tested positive for COVID-19, Beth Farmer was flown out to be an emergency alternate.)	Gangneung CC, Gangneung Skip: Kim Eun-jung; Third: Kim Kyeong-ae; Second: Kim Cho-hi; Lead: Kim Seon-yeong; Alternate: Kim Yeong-mi	Sundbybergs CK, Sundbyberg Skip: Anna Hasselborg; Third: Sara McManus; Second: Agnes Knochenhauer; Lead: Sofia Mabergs; Alternate: Johanna Heldin
Switzerland	Turkey	United States		
CC Aarau, Aarau & Bern CC, Bern Fourth: Alina Pätz; Skip: Silvana Tirinzoni; Second: Esther Neuenschwander; Lead: Melanie Barbezat; Alternate: Carole Howald	Milli Piyango CA, Erzurum Skip: Dilşat Yıldız; Third: Öznur Polat; Second: Berfin Şengül; Lead: Ayşe Gözütok; Alternate: Mihriban Polat	Chaska CC, Chaska & Duluth CC, Duluth Skip: Cory Christensen; Third: Sarah Anderson; Second: Vicky Persinger; Lead: Taylor Anderson; Alternate: Sydney Mullaney		

=== WCF ranking ===
Year to date World Curling Federation order of merit ranking for each team prior to the event.

Nation (Skip)	Rank	Points
Sweden (Hasselborg)	3	285.739
Switzerland (Tirinzoni)	6	233.923
Canada (Einarson)	7	221.443
South Korea (Kim)	8	212.988
Germany (Jentsch)	17	148.810
Denmark (Dupont)	31	95.345
United States (Christensen)	41	65.723
Scotland (Morrison)	47	58.835
Turkey (Yıldız)	59	44.131
Italy (Constantini)	65	40.168
Norway (Rørvik)	67	38.506
Czech Republic (Baudyšová)	69	37.713
Japan (Kitazawa)	118	14.963

== Rule changes ==
The main rule change between the 2021 and 2022 WWCC is the introduction of the no-tick rule. This will prohibit ticking a stone off of the centre line until after the fifth stone of the end has been thrown. If a stone is ticked off of the centre line before then, it is restored to its position, similar to if a stone is removed from play from the free guard zone.

Due to malfunctioning Eye on the Hog sensors in the rocks, it was decided that beginning with games on March 20, curlers would use the "honour system" to determine whether players were making hogline violations. That is, curlers would be enforcing their opposition's violations.

== Round-robin standings ==
Final round-robin standings

Key
Teams to Playoffs

Country	Skip	W	L	W–L	PF	PA	EW	EL	BE	SE	S%	DSC
Switzerland	Silvana Tirinzoni	12	0	–	106	52	55	38	4	18	88.3%	30.98
South Korea	Kim Eun-jung	9	3	1–1	73	55	46	38	10	11	83.5%	37.42
Canada	Kerri Einarson	9	3	1–1	85	61	46	43	1	12	85.0%	37.69
Sweden	Anna Hasselborg	9	3	1–1	78	51	47	37	11	18	86.4%	42.09
United States	Cory Christensen	8	4	–	82	68	46	43	7	13	82.9%	44.46
Denmark	Madeleine Dupont	7	5	–	73	81	42	50	5	9	80.9%	44.69
Japan	Ikue Kitazawa	6	6	–	59	63	40	39	4	12	80.2%	56.84
Norway	Marianne Rørvik	5	7	1–0	65	77	42	43	11	14	82.2%	29.73
Germany	Daniela Jentsch	5	7	0–1	67	73	47	46	6	17	76.7%	38.80
Italy	Stefania Constantini	4	8	–	56	74	36	42	9	8	79.0%	53.78
Turkey	Dilşat Yıldız	2	10	1–0	56	97	38	51	3	6	74.8%	62.97
Czech Republic	Alžběta Baudyšová	2	10	0–1	55	91	40	49	7	6	77.0%	34.40
Scotland	Rebecca Morrison	0	12	–	10	22	4	10	1	0	74.2%	172.30

Round robin summary table
Pos.	Country	Canada	Czech Republic	Denmark	Germany	Italy	Japan	Norway	Scotland	South Korea	Sweden	Switzerland	Turkey	United States	Record
3	Canada	—N/a	9–6	8–4	8–5	9–2	10–4	4–6	W–L	7–8	10–8	3–11	8–4	9–3	9–3
12	Czech Republic	6–9	—	6–8	4–6	3–7	7–3	1–7	10–9	7–8	1–8	3–10	5–7	2–9	2–10
6	Denmark	4–8	8–6	—	11–8	7-5	1–8	11–4	W–L	8–7	4–9	3–7	11–10	5–9	7–5
9	Germany	5–8	6–4	8–11	—	7–5	7–5	6–11	W–L	2–7	5–6	6–7	8–1	7–8	5–7
10	Italy	2–9	7–3	5–7	5–7	—	2–9	8–4	W–L	4–7	2–6	6–8	9–7	6–7	4–8
7	Japan	4–10	3–7	8–1	5–7	9–2	—	9–5	W–L	L–W	4–8	3–11	7–6	7–6	6–6
8	Norway	6–4	7–1	4–11	11–6	4–8	5–9	—	W–L	6–7	3–6	5–8	10–5	4–12	5–7
13	Scotland	L–W	9–10	L–W	L–W	L–W	L–W	L–W	—	L–W	L–W	1–12	L–W	L–W	0–12
2	South Korea	8–7	8–7	7–8	7–2	7–4	W–L	7–6	W–L	—	3–7	5–8	10–2	11–4	9–3
4	Sweden	8–10	8–1	9–4	6–5	6–2	8–4	6–3	W–L	7–3	—	7–8	9–6	4–5	9–3
1	Switzerland	11–3	10–3	7–3	7–6	8–6	11–3	8–5	12–1	8–5	8–7	—	8–3	8–7	12–0
11	Turkey	4–8	7–5	10–11	1–8	7–9	6–7	5–10	W–L	2–10	6–9	3–8	—	5–12	2–10
5	United States	3–9	9–2	9–5	8–7	7–6	6–7	12–4	W–L	4–11	5–4	7–8	12–5	—	8–4

== Round-robin results ==
All draw times are listed in Pacific Time (UTC−07:00).

=== Draw 1 ===
Saturday, March 19, 2:00 pm

Sheet A	1	2	3	4	5	6	7	8	9	10	Final
Canada (Einarson)	2	3	0	2	2	0	X	X	X	X	9
Italy (Constantini) 🔨	0	0	1	0	0	1	X	X	X	X	2

Sheet B	1	2	3	4	5	6	7	8	9	10	Final
Sweden (Hasselborg) 🔨	0	0	2	0	2	3	0	2	0	X	9
Turkey (Yıldız)	0	0	0	2	0	0	3	0	1	X	6

Sheet C	1	2	3	4	5	6	7	8	9	10	Final
Czech Republic (Baudyšová) 🔨	0	1	0	1	0	0	0	0	X	X	2
United States (Christensen)	2	0	3	0	0	2	1	1	X	X	9

Sheet D	1	2	3	4	5	6	7	8	9	10	11	Final
South Korea (Kim) 🔨	0	1	0	2	0	0	0	1	2	0	1	7
Norway (Rørvik)	0	0	1	0	2	0	0	0	0	3	0	6

=== Draw 2 ===
Saturday, March 19, 7:00 pm

Sheet A	1	2	3	4	5	6	7	8	9	10	Final
Denmark (Dupont) 🔨	4	0	0	2	1	0	0	0	3	1	11
Germany (Jentsch)	0	3	1	0	0	1	2	1	0	0	8

Sheet B	1	2	3	4	5	6	7	8	9	10	Final
Canada (Einarson) 🔨	0	0	2	0	0	0	1	1	0	X	4
Norway (Rørvik)	2	1	0	0	1	1	0	0	1	X	6

Sheet C	1	2	3	4	5	6	7	8	9	10	Final
Scotland (Morrison) 🔨	1	0	0	0	0	0	X	X	X	X	1
Switzerland (Tirinzoni)	0	2	2	2	4	2	X	X	X	X	12

Sheet D	1	2	3	4	5	6	7	8	9	10	11	Final
Japan (Kitazawa)	1	0	2	0	0	2	0	0	1	0	1	7
Turkey (Yıldız) 🔨	0	1	0	1	0	0	2	1	0	1	0	6

=== Draw 3 ===
Sunday, March 20, 9:00 am

Sheet A	1	2	3	4	5	6	7	8	9	10	Final
Switzerland (Tirinzoni) 🔨	1	0	2	1	0	0	1	2	0	1	8
Sweden (Hasselborg)	0	1	0	0	1	3	0	0	2	0	7

Sheet B	1	2	3	4	5	6	7	8	9	10	Final
Germany (Jentsch) 🔨	0	0	0	1	0	0	1	0	X	X	2
South Korea (Kim)	1	1	1	0	2	1	0	1	X	X	7

Sheet C	1	2	3	4	5	6	7	8	9	10	Final
Italy (Constantini)	0	0	1	0	1	0	0	0	X	X	2
Japan (Kitazawa) 🔨	0	2	0	1	0	3	2	1	X	X	9

Sheet D	1	2	3	4	5	6	7	8	9	10	Final
Scotland (Morrison)	0	0	0	0	3	0	3	0	3	0	9
Czech Republic (Baudyšová) 🔨	0	2	3	0	0	2	0	1	0	2	10

=== Draw 4 ===
Sunday, March 20, 2:00 pm

Sheet A	1	2	3	4	5	6	7	8	9	10	11	Final
South Korea (Kim) 🔨	0	1	0	2	0	1	0	0	3	0	1	8
Czech Republic (Baudyšová)	0	0	2	0	1	0	1	0	0	3	0	7

Sheet B	1	2	3	4	5	6	7	8	9	10	11	Final
United States (Christensen)	0	2	0	0	2	1	0	0	1	0	1	7
Italy (Constantini) 🔨	0	0	0	2	0	0	2	1	0	1	0	6

Sheet C	1	2	3	4	5	6	7	8	9	10	Final
Turkey (Yıldız) 🔨	1	0	1	0	1	0	1	X	X	X	4
Canada (Einarson)	0	2	0	3	0	3	0	X	X	X	8

Sheet D	1	2	3	4	5	6	7	8	9	10	Final
Sweden (Hasselborg)	1	0	1	0	1	2	0	0	4	X	9
Denmark (Dupont) 🔨	0	1	0	0	0	0	2	1	0	X	4

=== Draw 5 ===
Sunday, March 20, 7:00 pm

Sheet A	1	2	3	4	5	6	7	8	9	10	Final
Japan (Kitazawa)	0	0	2	0	1	1	0	0	2	1	7
United States (Christensen) 🔨	0	1	0	1	0	0	3	1	0	0	6

Sheet B	Final
Denmark (Dupont) 🔨	W
Scotland (Morrison)	L

Sheet C	1	2	3	4	5	6	7	8	9	10	Final
Norway (Rørvik) 🔨	2	0	3	0	0	2	0	1	1	2	11
Germany (Jentsch)	0	1	0	1	2	0	2	0	0	0	6

Sheet D	1	2	3	4	5	6	7	8	9	10	Final
Switzerland (Tirinzoni) 🔨	3	0	3	0	1	4	X	X	X	X	11
Canada (Einarson)	0	2	0	1	0	0	X	X	X	X	3

=== Draw 6 ===
Monday, March 21, 9:00 am

Sheet A	1	2	3	4	5	6	7	8	9	10	Final
Italy (Constantini)	0	0	0	0	3	0	4	0	1	X	8
Norway (Rørvik) 🔨	0	0	0	3	0	0	0	1	0	X	4

Sheet B	1	2	3	4	5	6	7	8	9	10	Final
Czech Republic (Baudyšová)	0	0	0	1	0	0	0	X	X	X	1
Sweden (Hasselborg) 🔨	0	3	3	0	1	0	1	X	X	X	8

Sheet C	Final
Japan (Kitazawa) 🔨	W
Scotland (Morrison)	L

=== Draw 7 ===
Monday, March 21, 2:00 pm

Sheet A	1	2	3	4	5	6	7	8	9	10	Final
Czech Republic (Baudyšová) 🔨	1	0	0	1	1	1	0	0	0	X	4
Germany (Jentsch)	0	0	2	0	0	0	1	1	2	X	6

Sheet B	1	2	3	4	5	6	7	8	9	10	Final
Turkey (Yıldız)	0	0	1	0	1	0	0	1	0	X	3
Switzerland (Tirinzoni) 🔨	2	1	0	1	0	0	2	0	2	X	8

Sheet C	1	2	3	4	5	6	7	8	9	10	Final
Canada (Einarson) 🔨	1	0	0	1	0	3	2	0	1	X	8
Denmark (Dupont)	0	0	1	0	2	0	0	1	0	X	4

Sheet D	1	2	3	4	5	6	7	8	9	10	Final
United States (Christensen) 🔨	0	2	0	1	0	0	1	0	0	X	4
South Korea (Kim)	0	0	2	0	3	1	0	1	4	X	11

=== Draw 8 ===
Monday, March 21, 7:00 pm

Sheet A	Final
Scotland (Morrison)	L
Sweden (Hasselborg) 🔨	W

Sheet B	1	2	3	4	5	6	7	8	9	10	Final
Norway (Rørvik)	0	0	0	0	2	0	2	0	0	X	4
United States (Christensen) 🔨	1	0	1	2	0	1	0	3	4	X	12

Sheet C	1	2	3	4	5	6	7	8	9	10	Final
Switzerland (Tirinzoni)	0	2	0	0	2	0	0	3	0	1	8
Italy (Constantini) 🔨	1	0	1	0	0	0	1	0	3	0	6

Sheet D	1	2	3	4	5	6	7	8	9	10	Final
Germany (Jentsch) 🔨	0	1	0	0	0	0	2	1	2	1	7
Japan (Kitazawa)	0	0	2	0	2	1	0	0	0	0	5

=== Draw 9 ===
Tuesday, March 22, 9:00 am

Sheet B	1	2	3	4	5	6	7	8	9	10	Final
Sweden (Hasselborg) 🔨	0	0	2	0	1	0	0	2	1	X	6
Italy (Constantini)	0	1	0	0	0	1	0	0	0	X	2

Sheet C	Final
South Korea (Kim) 🔨	W
Scotland (Morrison)	L

Sheet D	1	2	3	4	5	6	7	8	9	10	11	Final
Denmark (Dupont) 🔨	2	0	3	1	0	0	2	0	2	0	1	11
Turkey (Yıldız)	0	1	0	0	4	1	0	2	0	2	0	10

=== Draw 10 ===
Tuesday, March 22, 2:00 pm

Sheet A	1	2	3	4	5	6	7	8	9	10	Final
Germany (Jentsch)	0	2	0	1	0	0	2	0	1	1	7
United States (Christensen) 🔨	1	0	3	0	0	2	0	2	0	0	8

Sheet B	1	2	3	4	5	6	7	8	9	10	Final
Japan (Kitazawa) 🔨	1	0	1	0	1	0	1	0	0	X	4
Canada (Einarson)	0	2	0	2	0	1	0	3	2	X	10

Sheet C	1	2	3	4	5	6	7	8	9	10	11	Final
Denmark (Dupont) 🔨	0	0	2	0	0	0	1	0	3	0	2	8
Czech Republic (Baudyšová)	0	1	0	2	0	1	0	1	0	1	0	6

Sheet D	1	2	3	4	5	6	7	8	9	10	Final
Norway (Rørvik)	0	1	0	3	0	0	0	1	0	X	5
Switzerland (Tirinzoni) 🔨	1	0	2	0	2	0	1	0	2	X	8

=== Draw 11 ===
Tuesday, March 22, 7:00 pm

Sheet A	1	2	3	4	5	6	7	8	9	10	Final
Turkey (Yıldız)	0	0	2	1	0	2	0	0	0	X	5
Norway (Rørvik) 🔨	3	1	0	0	2	0	2	1	1	X	10

Sheet B	Final
Scotland (Morrison)	L
Germany (Jentsch) 🔨	W

Sheet C	1	2	3	4	5	6	7	8	9	10	Final
Sweden (Hasselborg) 🔨	0	0	2	0	1	0	2	2	0	1	8
Japan (Kitazawa)	0	0	0	1	0	1	0	0	2	0	4

Sheet D	1	2	3	4	5	6	7	8	9	10	Final
Italy (Constantini)	0	0	1	0	0	1	1	0	1	X	4
South Korea (Kim) 🔨	0	1	0	1	2	0	0	3	0	X	7

=== Draw 12 ===
Wednesday, March 23, 9:00 am

Sheet A	1	2	3	4	5	6	7	8	9	10	Final
Switzerland (Tirinzoni)	1	0	3	0	2	2	0	2	X	X	10
Czech Republic (Baudyšová) 🔨	0	1	0	1	0	0	1	0	X	X	3

Sheet B	1	2	3	4	5	6	7	8	9	10	11	Final
South Korea (Kim) 🔨	2	0	0	0	2	0	1	0	2	0	0	7
Denmark (Dupont)	0	2	0	2	0	1	0	1	0	1	1	8

Sheet C	1	2	3	4	5	6	7	8	9	10	Final
United States (Christensen)	0	3	0	0	2	0	3	4	X	X	12
Turkey (Yıldız) 🔨	1	0	1	1	0	2	0	0	X	X	5

Sheet D	1	2	3	4	5	6	7	8	9	10	Final
Canada (Einarson) 🔨	3	1	1	0	3	0	0	1	0	1	10
Sweden (Hasselborg)	0	0	0	2	0	3	1	0	2	0	8

=== Draw 13 ===
Wednesday, March 23, 2:00 pm

Sheet A	1	2	3	4	5	6	7	8	9	10	Final
Japan (Kitazawa) 🔨	0	2	1	1	2	0	2	X	X	X	8
Denmark (Dupont)	0	0	0	0	0	1	0	X	X	X	1

Sheet B	1	2	3	4	5	6	7	8	9	10	Final
Switzerland (Tirinzoni) 🔨	2	0	0	2	0	0	2	2	0	0	8
United States (Christensen)	0	0	3	0	1	2	0	0	1	0	7

Sheet C	1	2	3	4	5	6	7	8	9	10	Final
Germany (Jentsch) 🔨	0	0	0	3	0	1	0	2	0	1	7
Italy (Constantini)	0	0	2	0	0	0	2	0	1	0	5

Sheet D	Final
Norway (Rørvik) 🔨	W
Scotland (Morrison)	L

=== Draw 14 ===
Wednesday, March 23, 7:00 pm

Sheet A	1	2	3	4	5	6	7	8	9	10	Final
Sweden (Hasselborg)	0	0	2	0	1	1	1	0	2	X	7
South Korea (Kim) 🔨	0	1	0	1	0	0	0	1	0	X	3

Sheet B	1	2	3	4	5	6	7	8	9	10	11	Final
Italy (Constantini)	0	0	1	0	2	0	2	2	0	0	2	9
Turkey (Yıldız) 🔨	0	2	0	1	0	0	0	0	3	1	0	7

Sheet C	Final
Scotland (Morrison)	L
Canada (Einarson) 🔨	W

Sheet D	1	2	3	4	5	6	7	8	9	10	Final
Czech Republic (Baudyšová) 🔨	0	1	0	1	0	1	0	2	2	X	7
Japan (Kitazawa)	0	0	1	0	1	0	1	0	0	X	3

=== Draw 15 ===
Thursday, March 24, 9:00 am

Sheet A	1	2	3	4	5	6	7	8	9	10	Final
United States (Christensen) 🔨	0	0	0	1	0	1	0	1	X	X	3
Canada (Einarson)	1	2	1	0	3	0	2	0	X	X	9

Sheet B	1	2	3	4	5	6	7	8	9	10	Final
Norway (Rørvik) 🔨	0	1	0	1	0	0	1	2	2	X	7
Czech Republic (Baudyšová)	0	0	1	0	0	0	0	0	0	X	1

Sheet C	1	2	3	4	5	6	7	8	9	10	Final
Denmark (Dupont) 🔨	0	0	0	1	0	0	2	0	X	X	3
Switzerland (Tirinzoni)	0	1	1	0	4	1	0	0	X	X	7

Sheet D	1	2	3	4	5	6	7	8	9	10	Final
Turkey (Yıldız)	0	0	0	0	0	0	1	X	X	X	1
Germany (Jentsch) 🔨	0	1	2	1	3	1	0	X	X	X	8

=== Draw 16 ===
Thursday, March 24, 2:00 pm

Sheet A	Final
Italy (Constantini) 🔨	W
Scotland (Morrison)	L

Sheet B	1	2	3	4	5	6	7	8	9	10	Final
Germany (Jentsch)	0	0	0	2	0	0	1	0	2	0	5
Sweden (Hasselborg) 🔨	0	2	1	0	0	1	0	1	0	1	6

Sheet C	1	2	3	4	5	6	7	8	9	10	Final
Japan (Kitazawa)	0	0	0	1	1	0	2	1	0	4	9
Norway (Rørvik) 🔨	0	3	0	0	0	0	0	0	1	0	5

Sheet D	1	2	3	4	5	6	7	8	9	10	Final
South Korea (Kim) 🔨	0	0	1	0	2	0	1	0	1	X	5
Switzerland (Tirinzoni)	2	1	0	1	0	2	0	2	0	X	8

=== Draw 17 ===
Thursday, March 24, 7:00 pm

Sheet A	1	2	3	4	5	6	7	8	9	10	Final
Czech Republic (Baudyšová) 🔨	0	1	0	1	0	2	0	1	0	X	5
Turkey (Yıldız)	1	0	2	0	2	0	2	0	0	X	7

Sheet B	1	2	3	4	5	6	7	8	9	10	11	Final
Canada (Einarson) 🔨	1	0	1	0	2	0	0	3	0	0	0	7
South Korea (Kim)	0	3	0	1	0	1	0	0	1	1	1	8

Sheet C	1	2	3	4	5	6	7	8	9	10	Final
United States (Christensen) 🔨	0	2	1	0	0	1	0	0	0	1	5
Sweden (Hasselborg)	1	0	0	0	2	0	0	1	0	0	4

Sheet D	1	2	3	4	5	6	7	8	9	10	Final
Denmark (Dupont)	0	2	0	2	0	0	1	0	2	X	7
Italy (Constantini) 🔨	2	0	1	0	0	1	0	1	0	X	5

=== Draw 18 ===
Friday, March 25, 9:00 am

Sheet A	1	2	3	4	5	6	7	8	9	10	Final
Norway (Rørvik)	0	1	0	1	1	1	0	0	X	X	4
Denmark (Dupont) 🔨	3	0	3	0	0	0	1	4	X	X	11

Sheet B	1	2	3	4	5	6	7	8	9	10	Final
Switzerland (Tirinzoni) 🔨	2	0	5	3	0	1	X	X	X	X	11
Japan (Kitazawa)	0	1	0	0	2	0	X	X	X	X	3

Sheet C	1	2	3	4	5	6	7	8	9	10	Final
Canada (Einarson)	1	0	2	0	2	0	2	0	1	X	8
Germany (Jentsch) 🔨	0	1	0	1	0	1	0	2	0	X	5

Sheet D	Final
Scotland (Morrison)	L
United States (Christensen) 🔨	W

=== Draw 19 ===
Friday, March 25, 2:00 pm

Sheet A	Final
South Korea (Kim) 🔨	W
Japan (Kitazawa)	L

Sheet B	Final
Turkey (Yıldız) 🔨	W
Scotland (Morrison)	L

Sheet C	1	2	3	4	5	6	7	8	9	10	Final
Italy (Constantini) 🔨	0	0	0	1	1	0	0	5	0	X	7
Czech Republic (Baudyšová)	0	0	0	0	0	0	2	0	1	X	3

Sheet D	1	2	3	4	5	6	7	8	9	10	Final
Sweden (Hasselborg)	0	0	1	2	0	0	2	1	0	X	6
Norway (Rørvik) 🔨	0	0	0	0	1	1	0	0	1	X	3

=== Draw 20 ===
Friday, March 25, 7:00 pm

Sheet A	1	2	3	4	5	6	7	8	9	10	Final
Germany (Jentsch) 🔨	1	0	1	1	0	1	1	0	1	0	6
Switzerland (Tirinzoni)	0	2	0	0	2	0	0	2	0	1	7

Sheet B	1	2	3	4	5	6	7	8	9	10	Final
United States (Christensen) 🔨	0	2	0	4	1	0	0	0	2	X	9
Denmark (Dupont)	0	0	2	0	0	1	1	1	0	X	5

Sheet C	1	2	3	4	5	6	7	8	9	10	Final
Turkey (Yıldız)	0	0	0	0	1	0	1	0	X	X	2
South Korea (Kim) 🔨	0	0	2	1	0	4	0	3	X	X	10

Sheet D	1	2	3	4	5	6	7	8	9	10	Final
Czech Republic (Baudyšová)	0	0	2	0	1	0	2	0	1	X	6
Canada (Einarson) 🔨	2	0	0	3	0	2	0	2	0	X	9

== Playoffs ==
Qualification games
4	Sweden	8
5	United States	6
3	Canada	9
6	Denmark	8

Semifinals
1	Switzerland	7
4	Sweden	5
2	South Korea	9
3	Canada	6

Final
1	Switzerland	7
2	South Korea	6
Bronze-medal game
4	Sweden	7
3	Canada	8

=== Qualification games ===
Saturday, March 26, 1:00 pm

Sheet A	1	2	3	4	5	6	7	8	9	10	Final
Canada (Einarson) 🔨	2	0	2	0	0	2	0	3	0	0	9
Denmark (Dupont)	0	3	0	1	0	0	2	0	1	1	8

Player percentages
Canada		Denmark	
Briane Meilleur	83%	My Larsen	81%
Shannon Birchard	85%	Denise Dupont	89%
Val Sweeting	79%	Mathilde Halse	63%
Kerri Einarson	83%	Madeleine Dupont	78%
Total	82%	Total	78%

Sheet C	1	2	3	4	5	6	7	8	9	10	Final
Sweden (Hasselborg) 🔨	0	1	1	0	1	0	1	0	0	4	8
United States (Christensen)	0	0	0	2	0	1	0	2	1	0	6

Player percentages
Sweden		United States	
Sofia Mabergs	89%	Taylor Anderson	86%
Agnes Knochenhauer	88%	Sarah Anderson	85%
Sara McManus	73%	Vicky Persinger	86%
Anna Hasselborg	82%	Cory Christensen	83%
Total	83%	Total	85%

=== Semifinals ===
Saturday, March 26, 7:00 pm

Sheet A	1	2	3	4	5	6	7	8	9	10	Final
Switzerland (Tirinzoni) 🔨	1	0	2	0	1	0	0	2	0	1	7
Sweden (Hasselborg)	0	1	0	2	0	0	2	0	0	0	5

Player percentages
Switzerland		Sweden	
Melanie Barbezat	83%	Sofia Mabergs	80%
Esther Neuenschwander	84%	Agnes Knochenhauer	85%
Silvana Tirinzoni	86%	Sara McManus	83%
Alina Pätz	93%	Anna Hasselborg	75%
Total	86%	Total	81%

Sheet C	1	2	3	4	5	6	7	8	9	10	Final
South Korea (Kim) 🔨	0	2	0	1	0	1	0	2	1	2	9
Canada (Einarson)	0	0	1	0	2	0	3	0	0	0	6

Player percentages
South Korea		Canada	
Kim Seon-yeong	83%	Briane Meilleur	91%
Kim Cho-hi	75%	Shannon Birchard	83%
Kim Kyeong-ae	79%	Val Sweeting	71%
Kim Eun-jung	71%	Kerri Einarson	64%
Total	77%	Total	77%

=== Bronze-medal game ===
Sunday, March 27, 11:00 am

Sheet B	1	2	3	4	5	6	7	8	9	10	11	Final
Sweden (Hasselborg)	0	2	0	1	1	0	1	0	0	2	0	7
Canada (Einarson) 🔨	1	0	1	0	0	3	0	2	0	0	1	8

Player percentages
Sweden		Canada	
Sofia Mabergs	97%	Briane Meilleur	97%
Agnes Knochenhauer	78%	Shannon Birchard	89%
Sara McManus	81%	Val Sweeting	84%
Anna Hasselborg	89%	Kerri Einarson	83%
Total	86%	Total	88%

=== Final ===
Sunday, March 27, 4:00 pm

Sheet B	1	2	3	4	5	6	7	8	9	10	Final
Switzerland (Tirinzoni) 🔨	0	3	0	1	0	1	0	1	0	1	7
South Korea (Kim)	0	0	1	0	2	0	2	0	1	0	6

Player percentages
Switzerland		South Korea	
Melanie Barbezat	93%	Kim Seon-yeong	83%
Esther Neuenschwander	98%	Kim Cho-hi	91%
Silvana Tirinzoni	90%	Kim Kyeong-ae	89%
Alina Pätz	93%	Kim Eun-jung	86%
Total	93%	Total	87%

== Statistics ==
=== Top 5 player percentages ===
Final round robin percentages

Leads	%
(Sweden) Sofia Mabergs	89.9
(United States) Taylor Anderson	89.3
(Norway) Martine Rønning	88.6
(Canada) Briane Meilleur	88.4
(Denmark) My Larsen	88.2

Seconds	%
(Switzerland) Esther Neuenschwander	91.3
(United States) Vicky Persinger	85.5
(Norway) Mille Haslev Nordbye	85.1
(Canada) Shannon Birchard	84.1
(Sweden) Agnes Knochenhauer	83.9

Thirds	%
(Sweden) Sara McManus	89.4
(Switzerland) Silvana Tirinzoni (Skip)	87.0
(Canada) Val Sweeting	85.9
(South Korea) Kim Kyeong-ae	85.6
(Japan) Seina Nakajima	82.0

Skips	%
(Switzerland) Alina Pätz (Fourth)	88.8
(Sweden) Anna Hasselborg	82.6
(Canada) Kerri Einarson	81.4
(United States) Cory Christensen	79.4
(South Korea) Kim Eun-jung	77.7

=== Perfect games ===
Minimum 10 shots thrown

Player	Team	Position	Shots	Opponent
Alina Pätz	Switzerland	Fourth	12	Scotland
Kerri Einarson	Canada	Skip	14	Turkey
Sara McManus	Sweden	Third	14	Czech Republic
Silvana Tirinzoni	Switzerland	Skip	16	Czech Republic
Marianne Rørvik	Norway	Skip	18	Czech Republic

== Final standings ==
Place	Team
1st place, gold medalist(s)	Switzerland
2nd place, silver medalist(s)	South Korea
3rd place, bronze medalist(s)	Canada
4	Sweden
5	United States
6	Denmark
7	Japan
8	Norway
9	Germany
10	Italy
11	Turkey
12	Czech Republic
DNF	Scotland
