= My Larsen =

Danish curler (born 1999)

- Curler
- Other names: My Hollinger Larsen
- Born: My Hollinger; 9 February 1999 (age 27); Gentofte, Denmark

Team
- Curling club: Gentofte CC, Gentofte, Hvidovre CC, Hvidovre

Curling career
- Member Association: Denmark
- World Championship: 6 (2021, 2022, 2023, 2024, 2025, 2026)
- European Championship: 6 (2019, 2021, 2022, 2023, 2024, 2025)
- Olympic: 2 (2022, 2026)
- Other appearances: World Mixed Championship: 1 (2019), World Junior Championships: 1 (2020), World Junior-B Championships: 3 (2016, 2019 (Jan), 2019 (Dec))
Medal record
Women's curling
Representing Denmark
European Curling Championships
Gold medal – first place	2022 Östersund

My Larsen (born 9 February 1999 as My Hollinger, also known as My Hollinger Larsen) is a Danish female curler from Hvidovre.

== Personal life ==
Larsen works as an occupational therapist.

== Teams ==
=== Women's ===
Season	Skip	Third	Second	Lead	Alternate	Coach	Events
2015–16	Mathilde Halse	Elizabeth Søndergaard-Nielsen	Anna Solberg	My Hollinger	Gabriella Qvist	Are Solberg	DJCC 2016 (gold); WJBCC 2016 (12th)
2018–19	Mathilde Halse	Jasmin Lander	Gabriella Qvist	My Hollinger	Julie Jørgensen (WJBCC)	Mikael Qvist, Ulrik Schmidt	DJCC 2019 (gold); WJBCC 2019 (Jan) (5th)
2019–20	Mathilde Halse	Jasmin Lander	Karolina Jensen	My Larsen	Gabriella Qvist	Mikael Qvist	ECC 2019 (7th); WJBCC 2019 (Dec) (bronze); WJCC 2020 (6th)
2020–21	Madeleine Dupont	Mathilde Halse	Denise Dupont	Lina Knudsen	My Larsen	Heather Rogers	WWCC 2021 (5th)
2021–22	Madeleine Dupont	Mathilde Halse	Denise Dupont	My Larsen	Jasmin Lander	Heather Rogers	ECC 2021 (8th); WQE 2022 (gold); WWCC 2022 (6th)
2022–23	Madeleine Dupont	Mathilde Halse	Denise Dupont	My Larsen	Jasmin Lander	Heather Rogers	ECC 2022 (gold); WWCC 2023 (11th)
2023–24	Madeleine Dupont	Mathilde Halse	Jasmin Lander	My Larsen	Denise Dupont	Ulrik Schmidt	ECC 2023 (7th); WWCC 2024 (6th)
2024–25	Madeleine Dupont	Mathilde Halse	Denise Dupont	My Larsen	Jasmin Holtermann	Ulrik Schmidt	ECC 2024 (5th); WWCC 2025 (7th)
2025–26	Madeleine Dupont	Mathilde Halse	Jasmin Holtermann	Denise Dupont	My Larsen	Ulrik Schmidt	ECC 2025 (5th); WOG 2026; WWCC 2026

=== Mixed ===
Season	Skip	Third	Second	Lead	Events
2019–20	Tobias Thune	Jasmin Lander	Henrik Holtermann	My Larsen	WMxCC 2019 (5th)
