= 2016 World Junior Curling Championships =

Championships

- Host city: Copenhagen, Denmark
- Arena: Tårnby Curling Club
- Dates: March 5–13
- Men's winner: Scotland
- Skip: Bruce Mouat
- Third: Bobby Lammie
- Second: Gregor Cannon
- Lead: Angus Dowell
- Alternate: Robin Brydone
- Finalist: United States (Korey Dropkin)
- Women's winner: Canada
- Skip: Mary Fay
- Third: Kristin Clarke
- Second: Karlee Burgess
- Lead: Janique LeBlanc
- Alternate: Sarah Daniels
- Finalist: United States (Cory Christensen)

The 2016 World Junior Curling Championships were held from March 5 to 13 at the Tårnby Curling Club in Copenhagen, Denmark.

== Men ==
=== Teams ===
Country	Skip	Third	Second	Lead	Alternate
Canada	Matt Dunstone	Colton Lott	Kyle Doering	Rob Gordon	Wade Ford
Denmark	Tobias Thune	Tobias Engelhardt	Henrik Holtermann	Nikolaj Skau	Simon Borregaard
Norway	Magnus Ramsfjell	Bendik Ramsfjell	Magnus Vågberg	Elias Høstmæhlingen	Eskil Vintervold
Russia	Timur Gadzhikhanov (fourth)	Daniil Goriachev	Dmitry Solomatin	Alexander Eremin (skip)	Lev Puzakov
Scotland	Bruce Mouat	Bobby Lammie	Gregor Cannon	Angus Dowell	Robin Brydone
South Korea	Seong Yu-jin	Hong Jun-yeong	Jeon Byeong-uk	Lee Ge-on	Lee Jae-ho
Sweden	Rasmus Wranå	Fredrik Nyman	Jordan Wåhlin	Max Baeck	Axel Sjøberg
Switzerland	Yannick Schwaller	Romano Meier	Patrick Witschonke	Michael Probst	Simon Gloor
Turkey	Uğurcan Karagöz	Oğuzhan Karakurt	Emre Karaman	Enes Taşkesen	Muhammed Uçan
United States	Korey Dropkin	Thomas Howell	Mark Fenner	Alex Fenson	Quinn Evenson

=== Round-robin standings ===
Final Round Robin Standings

Key
Teams to Playoffs
Teams to relegated to "B" championships

Country	Skip	W	L
United States	Korey Dropkin	8	1
Scotland	Bruce Mouat	7	2
Canada	Matt Dunstone	7	2
Switzerland	Yannick Schwaller	6	3
Norway	Magnus Ramsfjell	5	4
Sweden	Rasmus Wranå	5	4
Russia	Alexander Eremin	3	6
Denmark	Tobias Thune	2	7
Turkey	Uğurcan Karagöz	2	7
South Korea	Seong Yu-jin	0	9

South Korea is not able to be relegated due to their hosting of the 2017 World Junior Curling Championships, so therefore the next lowest ranked team, Russia is relegated to the 2017 "B" Championships

=== Round-robin results ===
All draw times are listed in Central European Time (UTC+01).

==== Draw 1 ====
Sunday, March 6, 14:00

Sheet A	1	2	3	4	5	6	7	8	9	10	Final
Switzerland (Schwaller) 🔨	1	0	0	4	1	1	0	2	X	X	9
Turkey (Karagöz)	0	0	1	0	0	0	1	0	X	X	2

Sheet B	1	2	3	4	5	6	7	8	9	10	Final
Scotland (Mouat) 🔨	2	0	0	1	1	0	2	0	1	X	7
Norway (Ramsfjell)	0	0	1	0	0	1	0	2	0	X	4

Sheet C	1	2	3	4	5	6	7	8	9	10	Final
United States (Dropkin)	0	0	0	1	1	0	X	X	X	X	2
Canada (Dunstone) 🔨	2	0	2	0	0	4	X	X	X	X	8

Sheet D	1	2	3	4	5	6	7	8	9	10	Final
South Korea (Seong)	0	0	0	0	0	2	0	0	X	X	2
Russia (Eremin) 🔨	0	0	3	0	1	0	1	2	X	X	7

Sheet E	1	2	3	4	5	6	7	8	9	10	Final
Denmark (Thune)	0	0	1	0	0	0	1	0	0	X	2
Sweden (Wranå) 🔨	2	0	0	2	0	1	0	1	4	X	10

==== Draw 2 ====
Monday, March 7, 9:00

Sheet A	1	2	3	4	5	6	7	8	9	10	Final
Norway (Ramsfjell) 🔨	0	2	1	4	0	0	3	X	X	X	10
South Korea (Seong)	1	0	0	0	0	1	0	X	X	X	2

Sheet B	1	2	3	4	5	6	7	8	9	10	Final
Turkey (Karagöz) 🔨	1	0	0	2	2	0	3	0	0	0	8
Russia (Eremin)	0	1	0	0	0	2	0	2	1	1	7

Sheet C	1	2	3	4	5	6	7	8	9	10	Final
Denmark (Thune) 🔨	0	0	1	1	0	0	0	0	2	0	4
Switzerland (Schwaller)	0	0	0	0	2	3	0	0	0	1	6

Sheet D	1	2	3	4	5	6	7	8	9	10	Final
Sweden (Wranå)	1	0	0	0	0	1	1	0	1	0	4
Canada (Dunstone) 🔨	0	1	0	0	1	0	0	2	0	1	5

Sheet E	1	2	3	4	5	6	7	8	9	10	11	Final
Scotland (Mouat) 🔨	1	0	2	1	0	0	0	1	0	1	0	6
United States (Dropkin)	0	1	0	0	2	0	1	0	2	0	1	7

==== Draw 3 ====
Monday, March 7, 19:00

Sheet A	1	2	3	4	5	6	7	8	9	10	Final
Canada (Dunstone) 🔨	1	0	2	0	1	1	0	2	0	0	7
Scotland (Mouat)	0	2	0	1	0	0	1	0	3	3	10

Sheet B	1	2	3	4	5	6	7	8	9	10	Final
Switzerland (Schwaller) 🔨	1	0	0	0	1	0	0	1	1	0	4
Sweden (Wranå)	0	0	2	0	0	0	2	0	0	1	5

Sheet C	1	2	3	4	5	6	7	8	9	10	Final
Turkey (Karagöz) 🔨	0	1	3	4	1	0	X	X	X	X	9
South Korea (Seong)	1	0	0	0	0	1	X	X	X	X	2

Sheet D	1	2	3	4	5	6	7	8	9	10	Final
United States (Dropkin) 🔨	0	2	0	3	0	1	3	X	X	X	9
Denmark (Thune)	0	0	1	0	1	0	0	X	X	X	2

Sheet E	1	2	3	4	5	6	7	8	9	10	Final
Norway (Ramsfjell)	0	0	0	1	0	0	1	0	0	X	2
Russia (Eremin) 🔨	0	0	1	0	2	2	0	2	1	X	8

==== Draw 4 ====
Tuesday, March 8, 14:00

Sheet A	1	2	3	4	5	6	7	8	9	10	Final
Russia (Eremin)	1	0	1	1	0	0	2	0	3	X	8
Denmark (Thune) 🔨	0	1	0	0	1	0	0	1	0	X	3

Sheet B	1	2	3	4	5	6	7	8	9	10	Final
United States (Dropkin) 🔨	0	2	0	0	2	0	2	0	3	X	9
South Korea (Seong)	0	0	0	1	0	1	0	2	0	X	4

Sheet C	1	2	3	4	5	6	7	8	9	10	Final
Sweden (Wranå) 🔨	0	0	2	0	2	0	0	2	0	0	6
Norway (Ramsfjell)	0	1	0	3	0	1	2	0	0	1	8

Sheet D	1	2	3	4	5	6	7	8	9	10	Final
Canada (Dunstone) 🔨	0	0	0	0	2	0	1	0	2	X	5
Switzerland (Schwaller)	0	0	0	0	0	2	0	5	0	X	7

Sheet E	1	2	3	4	5	6	7	8	9	10	Final
Turkey (Karagöz)	1	0	2	0	0	1	0	X	X	X	4
Scotland (Mouat) 🔨	0	6	0	2	1	0	4	X	X	X	13

==== Draw 5 ====
Wednesday, March 9, 9:00

Sheet A	1	2	3	4	5	6	7	8	9	10	Final
United States (Dropkin) 🔨	0	2	0	0	3	0	1	1	0	2	9
Norway (Ramsfjell)	3	0	1	1	0	1	0	0	0	0	6

Sheet B	1	2	3	4	5	6	7	8	9	10	Final
Denmark (Thune) 🔨	3	1	0	0	1	0	0	1	0	0	6
Turkey (Karagöz)	0	0	1	0	0	0	1	0	1	1	4

Sheet C	1	2	3	4	5	6	7	8	9	10	Final
Switzerland (Schwaller) 🔨	3	0	0	0	0	1	0	0	1	0	5
Russia (Eremin)	0	0	0	0	1	0	0	1	0	1	3

Sheet D	1	2	3	4	5	6	7	8	9	10	Final
Scotland (Mouat) 🔨	3	2	1	0	3	0	X	X	X	X	9
Sweden (Wranå)	0	0	0	1	0	1	X	X	X	X	2

Sheet E	1	2	3	4	5	6	7	8	9	10	Final
South Korea (Seong)	0	1	0	0	0	1	X	X	X	X	2
Canada (Dunstone) 🔨	4	0	2	4	2	0	X	X	X	X	12

==== Draw 6 ====
Wednesday, March 9, 19:00

Sheet A	1	2	3	4	5	6	7	8	9	10	Final
Denmark (Thune)	0	0	0	0	1	0	X	X	X	X	1
Canada (Dunstone) 🔨	2	1	2	0	0	4	X	X	X	X	9

Sheet B	1	2	3	4	5	6	7	8	9	10	Final
Norway (Ramsfjell) 🔨	0	0	0	2	0	2	0	0	1	1	6
Switzerland (Schwaller)	0	0	0	0	1	0	1	1	0	0	3

Sheet C	1	2	3	4	5	6	7	8	9	10	Final
South Korea (Seong)	0	0	1	0	1	0	1	0	X	X	3
Scotland (Mouat) 🔨	2	1	0	2	0	2	0	3	X	X	10

Sheet D	1	2	3	4	5	6	7	8	9	10	Final
Russia (Eremin)	0	0	1	0	0	0	1	0	1	X	3
United States (Dropkin) 🔨	0	2	0	1	1	0	0	1	0	X	5

Sheet E	1	2	3	4	5	6	7	8	9	10	Final
Sweden (Wranå)	0	0	0	0	0	3	0	4	X	X	7
Turkey (Karagöz) 🔨	0	0	0	0	1	0	1	0	X	X	2

==== Draw 7 ====
Thursday, March 10, 14:00

Sheet A	1	2	3	4	5	6	7	8	9	10	Final
Scotland (Mouat) 🔨	2	0	4	3	0	1	X	X	X	X	10
Russia (Eremin)	0	1	0	0	1	0	X	X	X	X	2

Sheet B	1	2	3	4	5	6	7	8	9	10	11	Final
Sweden (Wranå)	0	1	0	0	1	0	1	1	0	1	0	5
United States (Dropkin) 🔨	1	0	1	1	0	1	0	0	1	0	1	6

Sheet C	1	2	3	4	5	6	7	8	9	10	Final
Canada (Dunstone) 🔨	4	1	1	0	4	0	X	X	X	X	10
Turkey (Karagöz)	0	0	0	1	0	1	X	X	X	X	2

Sheet D	1	2	3	4	5	6	7	8	9	10	Final
Denmark (Thune) 🔨	1	0	0	0	2	0	0	X	X	X	3
Norway (Ramsfjell)	0	2	2	1	0	3	1	X	X	X	9

Sheet E	1	2	3	4	5	6	7	8	9	10	Final
Switzerland (Schwaller) 🔨	3	0	0	1	1	0	0	2	0	X	7
South Korea (Seong)	0	0	1	0	0	0	0	0	1	X	2

==== Draw 8 ====
Friday, March 11, 9:00

Sheet A	1	2	3	4	5	6	7	8	9	10	Final
Turkey (Karagöz)	0	1	0	0	0	1	0	0	2	0	4
United States (Dropkin) 🔨	1	0	1	1	0	0	2	0	0	2	7

Sheet B	1	2	3	4	5	6	7	8	9	10	Final
South Korea (Seong) 🔨	0	0	0	0	1	2	0	X	X	X	3
Denmark (Thune)	1	1	2	2	0	0	5	X	X	X	11

Sheet C	1	2	3	4	5	6	7	8	9	10	Final
Russia (Eremin) 🔨	1	0	0	0	1	0	0	X	X	X	2
Sweden (Wranå)	0	0	0	1	0	5	1	X	X	X	7

Sheet D	1	2	3	4	5	6	7	8	9	10	Final
Switzerland (Schwaller) 🔨	1	0	4	0	2	0	3	X	X	X	10
Scotland (Mouat)	0	1	0	2	0	1	0	X	X	X	4

Sheet E	1	2	3	4	5	6	7	8	9	10	Final
Canada (Dunstone) 🔨	0	0	0	1	0	0	2	1	0	X	4
Norway (Ramsfjell)	0	0	0	0	1	1	0	0	1	X	3

==== Draw 9 ====
Friday, March 11, 19:00

Sheet A	1	2	3	4	5	6	7	8	9	10	Final
South Korea (Seong)	0	0	0	0	2	0	0	X	X	X	2
Sweden (Wranå) 🔨	0	2	2	3	0	1	1	X	X	X	9

Sheet B	1	2	3	4	5	6	7	8	9	10	Final
Russia (Eremin)	0	1	1	0	1	0	0	0	1	0	4
Canada (Dunstone) 🔨	1	0	0	1	0	2	0	0	0	2	6

Sheet C	1	2	3	4	5	6	7	8	9	10	Final
Scotland (Mouat) 🔨	2	0	2	1	0	3	X	X	X	X	8
Denmark (Thune)	0	1	0	0	1	0	X	X	X	X	2

Sheet D	1	2	3	4	5	6	7	8	9	10	Final
Norway (Ramsfjell) 🔨	3	0	1	0	4	0	1	2	X	X	11
Turkey (Karagöz)	0	2	0	0	0	2	0	0	X	X	4

Sheet E	1	2	3	4	5	6	7	8	9	10	Final
United States (Dropkin)	0	1	4	0	1	3	X	X	X	X	9
Switzerland (Schwaller) 🔨	2	0	0	1	0	0	X	X	X	X	3

=== Playoffs ===
Page playoff system
1	United States	5
2	Scotland	7
3	Canada	4
4	Switzerland	6

Semifinal
1	United States	5
4	Switzerland	2

Final
2	Scotland	6
1	United States	4

Bronze-medal game
4	Switzerland	4
3	Canada	8

==== 1 vs. 2 ====
Saturday, March 12, 14:00

Team	1	2	3	4	5	6	7	8	9	10	Final
United States (Dropkin) 🔨	1	0	1	0	1	0	0	0	2	0	5
Scotland (Mouat)	0	1	0	1	0	0	2	0	0	3	7

==== 3 vs. 4 ====
Saturday, March 12, 14:00

Team	1	2	3	4	5	6	7	8	9	10	Final
Canada (Dunstone) 🔨	0	2	0	1	0	0	0	1	0	X	4
Switzerland (Schwaller)	0	0	2	0	0	0	3	0	1	X	6

==== Semifinal ====
Saturday, March 12, 19:00

Team	1	2	3	4	5	6	7	8	9	10	Final
United States (Dropkin) 🔨	0	0	2	0	2	0	0	0	1	X	5
Switzerland (Schwaller)	0	0	0	1	0	0	0	1	0	X	2

==== Bronze-medal game ====
Sunday, March 13, 14:00

Team	1	2	3	4	5	6	7	8	9	10	Final
Switzerland (Schwaller) 🔨	0	0	1	0	1	0	2	0	0	X	4
Canada (Dunstone)	1	1	0	2	0	2	0	1	1	X	8

==== Final ====
Sunday, March 13, 14:00

Team	1	2	3	4	5	6	7	8	9	10	Final
Scotland (Mouat) 🔨	0	2	0	2	0	1	0	0	1	0	6
United States (Dropkin)	0	0	1	0	1	0	0	1	0	1	4

== Women ==
=== Teams ===
Country	Skip	Third	Second	Lead	Alternate
Canada	Mary Fay	Kristin Clarke	Karlee Burgess	Janique LeBlanc	Sarah Daniels
Hungary	Dorottya Palancsa	Henrietta Miklai	Vera Kalocsai	Bernadett Biro	
Japan	Ayano Tsuchiya	Yumi Suzuki	Yui Ueno	Asuka Kanai	Sae Yamamoto
Russia	Uliana Vasileva (fourth)	Maria Baksheeva	Ekaterina Kuzmina	Evgeniya Demkina (skip)	Maria Komarova
Scotland	Sophie Jackson	Naomi Brown	Rachael Halliday	Rachel Hannen	Katie Murray
South Korea	Kim Min-ji	Kim Hye-rin	Yang Tae-i	Oh Sun-yun	Lee Ji-young
Sweden	Therese Westman	Sarah Pengel	Maria Larsson	Mikaela Altebro	Johanna Heldin
Switzerland	Elena Stern	Anna Stern	Noëlle Iseli	Tanja Schwegler	Selina Witschonke
Turkey	Dilşat Yıldız	Semiha Konuksever	Berivan Polat	Mihriban Polat	
United States	Cory Christensen	Sarah Anderson	Taylor Anderson	Madison Bear	Christine McMakin

=== Round-robin standings ===
Final Round Robin Standings

Key
Teams to Playoffs
Teams to Tiebreaker
Teams to relegated to "B" championships

Country	Skip	W	L
Canada	Mary Fay	9	0
United States	Cory Christensen	7	2
South Korea	Kim Min-ji	7	2
Sweden	Therese Westman	5	4
Hungary	Dorottya Palancsa	5	4
Switzerland	Elena Stern	4	5
Turkey	Dilşat Yıldız	3	6
Russia	Evgeniya Demkina	3	6
Scotland	Sophie Jackson	2	7
Japan	Ayano Tsuchiya	0	9

=== Round-robin results ===
All draw times are listed in Central European Time (UTC+01).

==== Draw 1 ====
Sunday, March 6, 9:00

Sheet A	1	2	3	4	5	6	7	8	9	10	11	Final
South Korea (Kim)	0	0	0	1	0	0	3	0	2	0	1	7
Russia (Demkina) 🔨	0	0	1	0	0	1	0	3	0	1	0	6

Sheet B	1	2	3	4	5	6	7	8	9	10	Final
United States (Christensen) 🔨	1	0	1	0	1	0	1	3	1	X	8
Sweden (Westman)	0	1	0	2	0	3	0	0	0	X	6

Sheet C	1	2	3	4	5	6	7	8	9	10	Final
Turkey (Yıldız)	0	1	0	2	1	1	0	2	0	1	8
Hungary (Palancsa) 🔨	1	0	0	0	0	0	2	0	3	0	6

Sheet D	1	2	3	4	5	6	7	8	9	10	Final
Canada (Fay) 🔨	1	0	1	0	1	1	0	0	3	X	7
Switzerland (Stern)	0	1	0	0	0	0	1	0	0	X	2

Sheet E	1	2	3	4	5	6	7	8	9	10	Final
Japan (Tsuchiya)	2	0	0	0	1	0	0	0	1	X	4
Scotland (Jackson) 🔨	0	0	2	0	0	2	1	1	0	X	6

==== Draw 2 ====
Sunday, March 6, 19:00

Sheet A	1	2	3	4	5	6	7	8	9	10	Final
Sweden (Westman) 🔨	1	0	1	0	0	1	0	0	X	X	3
Canada (Fay)	0	2	0	3	3	0	1	1	X	X	10

Sheet B	1	2	3	4	5	6	7	8	9	10	Final
Russia (Demkina)	2	0	0	0	2	0	2	1	0	1	8
Switzerland (Stern) 🔨	0	0	2	1	0	3	0	0	0	0	6

Sheet C	1	2	3	4	5	6	7	8	9	10	Final
Japan (Tsuchiya) 🔨	1	0	0	1	0	0	0	1	X	X	3
South Korea (Kim)	0	0	2	0	2	1	4	0	X	X	9

Sheet D	1	2	3	4	5	6	7	8	9	10	Final
Scotland (Jackson) 🔨	0	0	2	0	3	0	1	0	0	X	6
Hungary (Palancsa)	1	3	0	2	0	1	0	1	2	X	10

Sheet E	1	2	3	4	5	6	7	8	9	10	Final
United States (Christensen)	0	3	0	3	1	0	1	0	2	X	10
Turkey (Yıldız) 🔨	1	0	1	0	0	1	0	1	0	X	4

==== Draw 3 ====
Monday, March 7, 14:00

Sheet A	1	2	3	4	5	6	7	8	9	10	Final
Hungary (Palancsa) 🔨	0	1	0	1	0	1	0	0	3	1	7
United States (Christensen)	0	0	2	0	1	0	1	2	0	0	6

Sheet B	1	2	3	4	5	6	7	8	9	10	Final
South Korea (Kim)	0	2	1	0	0	0	2	0	1	0	6
Scotland (Jackson) 🔨	1	0	0	0	1	1	0	1	0	1	5

Sheet C	1	2	3	4	5	6	7	8	9	10	Final
Russia (Demkina)	0	2	0	0	2	0	0	X	X	X	4
Canada (Fay) 🔨	2	0	3	1	0	0	4	X	X	X	10

Sheet D	1	2	3	4	5	6	7	8	9	10	11	Final
Turkey (Yıldız)	0	1	0	2	0	0	1	0	1	2	1	8
Japan (Tsuchiya) 🔨	1	0	1	0	2	1	0	2	0	0	0	7

Sheet E	1	2	3	4	5	6	7	8	9	10	Final
Sweden (Westman) 🔨	2	0	0	0	1	0	0	2	0	X	5
Switzerland (Stern)	0	2	3	1	0	2	2	0	2	X	12

==== Draw 4 ====
Tuesday, March 8, 9:00

Sheet A	1	2	3	4	5	6	7	8	9	10	11	Final
Switzerland (Stern) 🔨	2	0	2	0	2	0	0	0	1	0	2	9
Japan (Tsuchiya)	0	2	0	1	0	1	1	0	0	2	0	7

Sheet B	1	2	3	4	5	6	7	8	9	10	Final
Turkey (Yıldız)	0	0	1	1	0	1	0	0	0	X	3
Canada (Fay) 🔨	1	1	0	0	3	0	0	3	2	X	10

Sheet C	1	2	3	4	5	6	7	8	9	10	Final
Scotland (Jackson)	0	0	0	1	0	2	1	0	2	0	6
Sweden (Westman) 🔨	1	1	1	0	2	0	0	1	0	1	7

Sheet D	1	2	3	4	5	6	7	8	9	10	Final
Hungary (Palancsa) 🔨	4	0	0	1	0	0	0	1	0	X	6
South Korea (Kim)	0	2	1	0	2	0	3	0	1	X	9

Sheet E	1	2	3	4	5	6	7	8	9	10	Final
Russia (Demkina)	0	1	0	0	1	0	X	X	X	X	2
United States (Christensen) 🔨	2	0	4	2	0	3	X	X	X	X	11

==== Draw 5 ====
Tuesday, March 8, 19:00

Sheet A	1	2	3	4	5	6	7	8	9	10	Final
Turkey (Yıldız)	0	0	2	0	1	0	0	1	X	X	4
Sweden (Westman) 🔨	4	2	0	2	0	2	0	0	X	X	10

Sheet B	1	2	3	4	5	6	7	8	9	10	Final
Japan (Tsuchiya)	0	0	1	0	0	1	0	1	0	X	3
Russia (Demkina) 🔨	0	2	0	0	2	0	1	0	2	X	7

Sheet C	1	2	3	4	5	6	7	8	9	10	Final
South Korea (Kim) 🔨	0	0	0	0	1	0	2	1	0	1	5
Switzerland (Stern)	0	0	0	0	0	1	0	0	1	0	2

Sheet D	1	2	3	4	5	6	7	8	9	10	Final
United States (Christensen) 🔨	1	0	1	0	1	1	0	2	2	X	8
Scotland (Jackson)	0	2	0	1	0	0	1	0	0	X	4

Sheet E	1	2	3	4	5	6	7	8	9	10	Final
Canada (Fay) 🔨	1	0	2	0	4	0	2	X	X	X	9
Hungary (Palancsa)	0	1	0	1	0	1	0	X	X	X	3

==== Draw 6 ====
Wednesday, March 9, 14:00

Sheet A	1	2	3	4	5	6	7	8	9	10	Final
Japan (Tsuchiya)	0	2	1	0	1	0	2	0	1	0	7
Hungary (Palancsa) 🔨	1	0	0	2	0	2	0	1	0	2	8

Sheet B	1	2	3	4	5	6	7	8	9	10	Final
Sweden (Westman) 🔨	0	0	2	0	1	0	0	0	2	1	6
South Korea (Kim)	1	2	0	1	0	0	2	1	0	0	7

Sheet C	1	2	3	4	5	6	7	8	9	10	Final
Canada (Fay) 🔨	0	0	2	0	0	0	1	0	1	1	5
United States (Christensen)	0	0	0	0	2	1	0	0	0	0	3

Sheet D	1	2	3	4	5	6	7	8	9	10	Final
Switzerland (Stern) 🔨	2	0	0	3	0	1	0	1	3	X	10
Turkey (Yıldız)	0	1	1	0	1	0	1	0	0	X	4

Sheet E	1	2	3	4	5	6	7	8	9	10	Final
Scotland (Jackson)	0	0	0	1	0	0	0	1	0	X	2
Russia (Demkina) 🔨	0	0	1	0	0	0	3	0	1	X	5

==== Draw 7 ====
Thursday, March 10, 9:00

Sheet A	1	2	3	4	5	6	7	8	9	10	Final
United States (Christensen)	0	0	2	2	0	1	0	1	1	X	7
Switzerland (Stern) 🔨	0	1	0	0	1	0	1	0	0	X	3

Sheet B	1	2	3	4	5	6	7	8	9	10	Final
Scotland (Jackson)	1	0	0	2	0	1	0	3	0	0	7
Turkey (Yıldız) 🔨	0	1	1	0	1	0	1	0	1	1	6

Sheet C	1	2	3	4	5	6	7	8	9	10	11	Final
Hungary (Palancsa) 🔨	1	0	0	2	0	1	0	0	3	0	1	8
Russia (Demkina)	0	0	2	0	3	0	0	1	0	1	0	7

Sheet D	1	2	3	4	5	6	7	8	9	10	Final
Japan (Tsuchiya)	0	0	3	0	0	0	0	0	2	0	5
Sweden (Westman) 🔨	1	0	0	2	0	0	1	2	0	1	7

Sheet E	1	2	3	4	5	6	7	8	9	10	Final
South Korea (Kim) 🔨	2	0	0	0	1	0	1	0	0	X	4
Canada (Fay)	0	1	1	1	0	3	0	2	1	X	9

==== Draw 8 ====
Thursday, March 10, 19:00

Sheet A	1	2	3	4	5	6	7	8	9	10	Final
Russia (Demkina)	0	2	0	1	0	1	0	0	3	0	7
Turkey (Yıldız) 🔨	1	0	0	0	1	0	2	4	0	1	9

Sheet B	1	2	3	4	5	6	7	8	9	10	Final
Canada (Fay) 🔨	2	0	1	0	3	1	0	0	0	0	7
Japan (Tsuchiya)	0	0	0	1	0	0	2	1	1	1	6

Sheet C	1	2	3	4	5	6	7	8	9	10	Final
Switzerland (Stern) 🔨	3	2	0	0	2	0	1	0	3	X	11
Scotland (Jackson)	0	0	0	2	0	1	0	1	0	X	4

Sheet D	1	2	3	4	5	6	7	8	9	10	11	Final
South Korea (Kim)	0	2	0	0	0	1	0	0	2	1	0	6
United States (Christensen) 🔨	3	0	2	0	0	0	1	0	0	0	1	7

Sheet E	1	2	3	4	5	6	7	8	9	10	Final
Hungary (Palancsa)	0	0	1	0	0	2	0	0	X	X	3
Sweden (Westman) 🔨	0	3	0	2	0	0	3	1	X	X	9

==== Draw 9 ====
Friday, March 11, 14:00

Sheet A	1	2	3	4	5	6	7	8	9	10	Final
Canada (Fay)	0	0	2	0	2	0	0	1	1	X	6
Scotland (Jackson) 🔨	0	0	0	1	0	1	0	0	0	X	2

Sheet B	1	2	3	4	5	6	7	8	9	10	Final
Switzerland (Stern)	0	0	2	0	1	0	0	2	0	X	5
Hungary (Palancsa) 🔨	2	0	0	1	0	0	2	0	2	X	7

Sheet C	1	2	3	4	5	6	7	8	9	10	Final
United States (Christensen) 🔨	2	0	2	0	2	1	0	4	X	X	11
Japan (Tsuchiya)	0	1	0	1	0	0	1	0	X	X	3

Sheet D	1	2	3	4	5	6	7	8	9	10	Final
Sweden (Westman) 🔨	1	0	1	0	1	0	1	2	3	X	9
Russia (Demkina)	0	2	0	1	0	2	0	0	0	X	5

Sheet E	1	2	3	4	5	6	7	8	9	10	Final
Turkey (Yıldız) 🔨	1	0	1	1	0	1	1	0	1	0	6
South Korea (Kim)	0	2	0	0	3	0	0	3	0	1	9

=== Tiebreaker ===
Saturday, March 12, 09:00

Team	1	2	3	4	5	6	7	8	9	10	Final
Sweden (Westman) 🔨	2	0	1	0	0	1	0	0	X	X	4
Hungary (Palancsa)	0	0	0	5	1	0	0	4	X	X	10

=== Relegation Tiebreaker ===
Saturday, March 12, 19:00

Team	1	2	3	4	5	6	7	8	9	10	Final
Turkey (Yıldız) 🔨	1	0	0	1	0	0	1	0	2	0	5
Russia (Demkina)	0	1	0	0	0	3	0	2	0	1	7

Turkey is therefore relegated to the 2017 World Junior B Curling Championships

=== Playoffs ===
Page playoff system
1	Canada	7
2	United States	8
3	South Korea	11
4	Hungary	12

Semifinal
1	Canada	9
4	Hungary	4

Final
2	United States	4
1	Canada	7

Bronze-medal game
4	Hungary	4
3	South Korea	8

==== 1 vs. 2 ====
Saturday, March 12, 14:00

Team	1	2	3	4	5	6	7	8	9	10	Final
Canada (Fay) 🔨	1	0	3	0	1	0	1	0	1	0	7
United States (Christensen)	0	2	0	1	0	1	0	2	0	2	8

==== 3 vs. 4 ====
Saturday, March 12, 14:00

Team	1	2	3	4	5	6	7	8	9	10	Final
South Korea (Kim) 🔨	1	0	1	0	2	0	4	0	3	0	11
Hungary (Palancsa)	0	1	0	2	0	3	0	3	0	3	12

==== Semifinal ====
Saturday, March 12, 19:00

Team	1	2	3	4	5	6	7	8	9	10	Final
Canada (Fay) 🔨	1	0	2	1	1	3	1	0	X	X	9
Hungary (Palancsa)	0	2	0	0	0	0	0	2	X	X	4

==== Bronze-medal game ====
Sunday, March 13, 9:00

Team	1	2	3	4	5	6	7	8	9	10	Final
Hungary (Palancsa) 🔨	1	0	0	0	2	0	0	1	0	X	4
South Korea (Kim)	0	2	1	1	0	2	1	0	1	X	8

==== Final ====
Sunday, March 13, 9:00

Team	1	2	3	4	5	6	7	8	9	10	Final
United States (Christensen) 🔨	0	1	0	1	0	0	2	0	0	X	4
Canada (Fay)	0	0	2	0	0	2	0	2	1	X	7
