= Tobias Thune =

Danish curler

Tobias Thune Jacobsen
- Curler
- Born: 10 July 1994 (age 32); Frederiksberg, Denmark

Team
- Curling club: Gentofte CC (Gentofte)
- Skip: Mikkel Krause
- Third: Mads Nørgaard
- Second: Tobias Thune
- Lead: Henrik Holtermann
- Alternate: Oliver Rosenkrands Søe

Curling career
- Member Association: Denmark
- World Championship: 3 (2020, 2021, 2022)
- World Mixed Doubles Championship: 1 (2017)
- European Championship: 2 (2021, 2022)
- Olympic: 1 (2022)
- Other appearances: World Mixed Championship: 1 (2019), World Junior Championships: 2 (2010, 2016)

Tobias Thune Jacobsen (born 10 July 1994) is a Danish curler from Gentofte municipality.

At the national level, he is a three-time Danish men's champion curler (2017, 2020, 2023) and a four-time Danish junior champion curler (2012, 2013, 2015, 2016) and a four-time Danish individual (figur) champion (2014, 2015, 2017, 2018).

== Teams ==
=== Men's ===
Season	Skip	Third	Second	Lead	Alternate	Coach	Events
2009–10	Mikkel Krause	Oliver Dupont	Tobias Thune	Troels Harry	Kasper Jørgensen	John Helston	WJCC 2010 (8th)
2011–12	Tobias Thune	Asmus Jørgensen	Thor Fehrenkamp	Fabian Thune	Oliver Søe	Freddy Frederiksen	DJCC 2012 (gold); EJCC 2012 (6th)
2012–13	Tobias Thune	Asmus Jørgensen	Thor Fehrenkamp	Fabian Thune	Oliver Søe	Freddy Frederiksen	DJCC 2013 (gold); EJCC 2013 (silver)
2013–14	Mikael Qvist	Tobias Thune	Kim Sylvest Nielsen	Fabian Thune	Christian Thune		DMCC 2014 (5th)
2014–15	Tobias Thune Jacobsen	Mads Nørgård Rasmussen	Oliver Rosenkrands Søe	Thor Woldbye Fehrenkamp	Tobias Engelhardt Rasmussen (EJCC)	Freddy Frederiksen	DJCC 2015 (gold); EJCC 2015 (9th)
2015–16	Tobias Thune	Tobias Engelhardt	Henrik Holtermann	Nikolaj Skau	Simon Borregaard	Bo Nielsen	DJCC 2016 (gold); WJCC 2016 (8th)
2015–16	Tobias Thune	Mads Nørgård	Oliver Søe	Asmus Blaedel			
2016–17	Tobias Thune	Mads Nørgård	Oliver Søe	Asmus Blaedel			
2016–17	Rasmus Stjerne	Johnny Frederiksen	Mikkel Poulsen	Oliver Dupont	Tobias Thune		DMCC 2017 (gold)
2019–20	Tobias Thune	Kasper Wiksten	Daniel Poulsen	Oliver Søe			DMCC 2020 (gold) WCC 2020 (Canceled due to COVID-19)
2020–21	Mikkel Krause (fourth)	Tobias Thune	Mads Nørgård (skip)	Kasper Wiksten	Oliver Rosenkrands Søe	Kenneth Hertsdahl	WCC 2021 (11th)
2021–22	Mikkel Krause	Mads Nørgård	Henrik Holtermann	Kasper Wiksten	Tobias Thune	Kenneth Hertsdahl, Jasmin Lander (ECC)	ECC 2021 (6th); OQE 2021 (bronze)

=== Mixed ===
Season	Skip	Third	Second	Lead	Events
2019–20	Tobias Thune	Jasmin Lander	Henrik Holtermann	My Larsen	WMxCC 2019 (5th)

=== Mixed doubles ===
Season	Female	Male	Events
2019–20	Signe Schack	Tobias Thune	DMDCC 2022 (bronze)
2022–23	Signe Schack	Tobias Thune	DMDCC 2023 (7th)
