= Oliver Rosenkrands Søe =

Danish curler

- Curler
- Born: 30 September 1993 (age 33); Kastrup, Denmark

Team
- Curling club: Gentofte CC (Gentofte)
- Skip: Mikkel Krause
- Third: Mads Nørgaard
- Second: Tobias Thune
- Lead: Henrik Holtermann
- Alternate: Oliver Rosenkrands Søe

Curling career
- Member Association: Denmark
- World Championship: 2 (2021, 2022)
- European Championship: 2 (2022, 2023)
- Other appearances: European Junior Challenge: 3 (2012, 2013, 2015)
Medal record
Curling
European Junior Challenge
Silver medal – second place	Prague 2013
Danish Men's Championship
Gold medal – first place	2020 ...
Gold medal – first place	2023 ...
Bronze medal – third place	2024 ...
Danish Mixed Doubles Championship
Gold medal – first place	2022 Esbjerg
Silver medal – second place	2023 Gentofte

Oliver Rosenkrands Søe (born 30 September 1993) is a Danish curler from Gentofte municipality.

At the national level, he is a two-time Danish men's champion curler (2020, 2023), Danish mixed doubles champion curler (2022) and a three-time Danish junior champion curler (2012, 2013, 2015).

== Teams ==
=== Men's ===
Season	Skip	Third	Second	Lead	Alternate	Coach	Events
2011–12	Tobias Thune	Asmus Jørgensen	Thor Fehrenkamp	Fabian Thune	Oliver Søe	Freddy Frederiksen	DJCC 2012 (gold); EJCC 2012 (6th)
2012–13	Tobias Thune	Asmus Jørgensen	Thor Fehrenkamp	Fabian Thune	Oliver Søe	Freddy Frederiksen	DJCC 2013 (gold); EJCC 2013 (silver)
2014–15	Tobias Thune Jacobsen	Mads Nørgård Rasmussen	Oliver Rosenkrands Søe	Thor Woldbye Fehrenkamp	Tobias Engelhardt Rasmussen (EJCC)	Freddy Frederiksen	DJCC 2015 (gold); EJCC 2015 (9th)
2015–16	Tobias Thune	Mads Nørgård	Oliver Søe	Asmus Blaedel			
2016–17	Tobias Thune	Mads Nørgård	Oliver Søe	Asmus Blaedel			
2018–19	Daniel Poulsen	Oliver Søe	Nikolaj Maegaard	Daniel Munk			
2019–20	Tobias Thune	Kasper Wiksten	Daniel Poulsen	Oliver Søe			DMCC 2020 (gold); ~~WCC 2020~~
2020–21	Mikkel Krause (fourth)	Tobias Thune	Mads Nørgård (skip)	Kasper Wiksten	Oliver Rosenkrands Søe	Kenneth Hertsdahl	WCC 2021 (11th)
2021–22	Tobias Thune	Kasper Wiksten	Oliver Rosenkrands Søe	Daniel Poulsen	Mikkel Krause	Mikael Qvist	WCC 2022 (13th)
2022–23	Mikkel Krause	Mads Nørgaard	Tobias Thune	Henrik Holtermann	Oliver Søe	Ulrik Schmidt	ECC 2022 (10th)
2022–23	Mikael Qvist	Tobias Thune	Oliver Søe	Christian Thune			DMCC 2023 (gold)
2023–24	Mikkel Krause	Mads Nørgaard	Henrik Holtermann	Oliver Søe	Christian Karger	Bill Tschirhart (ECC)	ECC 2023 (17th); DMCC 2024 (bronze)

=== Mixed doubles ===
Season	Female	Male	Events
2019–20	Katerina Remisova	Oliver Søe	
2019–20	Caroline Jalo	Oliver Søe	DMDCC 2020 (4 место)
2021–22	Sarah Clifford	Oliver Søe	DMDCC 2022 (gold)
2022–23	Sarah Clifford	Oliver Søe	DMDCC 2023 (silver)
