= Henrik Holtermann =

Danish curler (born 1997)

- Curler
- Born: 23 March 1997 (age 29); Ballerup

Team
- Curling club: Hvidovre Curling Klub, Hvidovre
- Skip: Mikkel Krause
- Third: Mads Nørgård
- Second: Tobias Thune
- Lead: Henrik Holtermann
- Alternate: Oliver Rosenkrands Søe
- Mixed doubles partner: Jasmin Holtermann

Curling career
- Member Association: Denmark
- World Mixed Doubles Championship: 4 (2022, 2023, 2024, 2025)
- European Championship: 3 (2019, 2021, 2022)
- Olympic: 1 (2022)
- Other appearances: World Mixed Championships: 1 (2019), World Junior Championships: 1 (2016)

Henrik Høhling Holtermann (born 23 March 1997 in Ballerup) is a Danish curler.

At the national level, he is a three-time Danish junior champion curler (2016, 2017, 2018).

At the national level he is also a four-time individual Danish champion, three-time Danish Mixed Doubles champion and two-time Danish Mixed champion.

== Teams ==
=== Men's ===
| Season | Skip | Third | Second | Lead | Alternate | Coach | Events |
|---|---|---|---|---|---|---|---|
| 2015–16 | Tobias Thune | Tobias Engelhardt | Henrik Holtermann | Nikolaj Skau | Simon Borregaard | Bo Nielsen | DJCC 2016 (gold); WJCC 2016 (8th) |
| 2016–17 | Simon Haubjerg | Oliver Kristoffersen | Henrik Holtermann | Mads Baekdahl | | | DJCC 2017 (gold) |
| 2016–17 | Simon Haubjerg | Oliver Kristoffersen | Mads Nissen-Baekdahl | Henrik Holtermann | Kilian Thune | Kenneth Hertsdahl | WJBCC 2017 (5th) |
| 2017–18 | Henrik Holtermann | Mads Baekdahl | Kilian Thune | Jonathan Vilandt | Simon Haubjerg | | DJCC 2018 (gold) |
| 2017–18 | Henrik Holtermann (fourth) | Simon Haubjerg (skip) | Jonathan Vilandt | Kilian Thune | Matthias Palmelund | Lars Vilandt, Lene Nielsen | WJBCC 2018 (18th) |
| 2019–20 | Mikkel Krause | Mads Nørgård | Tobias Engelhardt | Henrik Holtermann | Kasper Wiksten (ECC) | Gert Larsen | ECC 2019 (4th); DMCC 2020 (5th) |
| 2020–21 | Mikkel Krause | Mads Nørgård | Henrik Holtermann | Tobias Rasmussen | | | |
| 2021–22 | Mikkel Krause | Mads Nørgård | Henrik Holtermann | Kasper Wiksten | Tobias Thune | Kenneth Hertsdahl, Jasmin Lander | ECC 2021 (6th) |

=== Mixed ===
| Season | Skip | Third | Second | Lead | Events |
|---|---|---|---|---|---|
| 2019–20 | Tobias Thune | Jasmin Lander | Henrik Holtermann | My Larsen | WMxCC 2019 (5th) |

=== Mixed doubles ===
| Season | Female | Male | Coach | Events |
|---|---|---|---|---|
| 2019–20 | Jasmin Lander | Henrik Holtermann | | |
| 2021–22 | Jasmin Lander | Henrik Holtermann | Kenneth Hertsdahl | OQE 2021 (7th) |
| 2021–22 | Jasmin Lander | Henrik Holtermann | | DMDCC 2022 (silver) |
| 2021–22 | Jasmin Lander | Henrik Holtermann | Ulrik Schmidt | WMDCC 2022 (12th) |
| 2022–23 | Jasmin Lander | Henrik Holtermann | Ulrik Schmidt | DMDCC 2023 (gold); WMDCC 2023 (9th) |
| 2023–24 | Jasmin Lander | Henrik Holtermann | Ulrik Schmidt | WMDCC 2024 (14th) |
| 2024–25 | Jasmin Holtermann | Henrik Holtermann | Ulrik Schmidt | WMDCC 2025 () |
