= Mads Nørgaard =

Danish curler

- Curler
- Other names: Mads Nørgaard Rasmussen
- Born: 30 October 1993 (age 33); Hvidovre, Denmark

Team
- Curling club: Hvidovre CC, Hvidovre, DEN
- Skip: Jacob Schmidt
- Fourth: Jonathan Vilandt
- Second: Alexander Qvist
- Lead: Kasper Jurlander Bøge
- Alternate: Mads Nørgaard

Curling career
- Member Association: Denmark
- World Championship: 1 (2021)
- European Championship: 5 (2018, 2019, 2021, 2022, 2025)
- Olympic: 1 (2022)
Medal record
Curling
European Championship B-Division
Gold medal – first place	2024 Östersund

Mads Nørgaard Rasmussen (born 30 October 1993) is a Danish curler from Hvidovre, Denmark. He is currently the alternate for the Danish National Men's Curling Team.

== Personal life ==
As of 2021, Nørgaard was a physiotherapy student.

== Teams ==
Season	Skip	Third	Second	Lead	Alternate
2010–11	Mads Nørgaard	Daniel Poulsen	Michael Hørmark	Nikolaj Maegaard	Alexander Behrndtz
2011–12	Mikkel Krause	Oliver Dupont	Mads Nørgaard	Dennis Hansen	
2012–13	Mikkel Krause	Oliver Dupont	Mads Nørgaard	Dennis Hansen	Kenneth Jørgensen
2013–14	Mikkel Krause	Oliver Dupont	Mads Nørgaard	Dennis Hansen	
2014–15	Tobias Thune	Mads Nørgaard	Oliver Rosenkrands Søe	Thor Woldbye	Tobias Engelhardt
2016–17	Tobias Thune	Mads Nørgaard	Oliver Rosenkrands Søe	Asmus Blædel	
2017–18	Mikkel Krause	Mads Nørgaard	Daniel Abrahamsen	Ulrik Damm	Daniel Poulsen
2018–19	Daniel Poulsen	Kasper Wiksten	Tobias Engelhardt	Daniel Buchholt	Mads Nørgaard
2019–20	Mikkel Krause	Mads Nørgaard	Tobias Engelhardt	Henrik Holtermann	Kasper Wiksten
2020–21	Mikkel Krause (Fourth)	Tobias Thune	Mads Nørgaard (Skip)	Kasper Wiksten	Oliver Rosenkrands Søe
2021–22	Mikkel Krause	Mads Nørgaard	Henrik Holtermann	Kasper Wiksten	Tobias Thune
2024–25	Jonathan Vilandt (Fourth)	Jacob Schmidt (Skip)	Alexander Qvist	Mads Nørgaard	Kasper Jurlander Bøge
2025–26	Jonathan Vilandt (Fourth)	Jacob Schmidt (Skip)	Alexander Qvist	Kasper Jurlander Bøge	Mads Nørgaard
