= Jasmin Holtermann =

Danish curler (born 2000)

- Curler
- Born: Jasmin Lander; 4 February 2000 (age 26); Hvidovre, Denmark

Team
- Curling club: Hvidovre CC, Hvidovre
- Skip: Madeleine Dupont
- Third: Mathilde Halse
- Second: Katrine Schmidt
- Lead: Denise Dupont
- Alternate: Jasmin Holtermann

Curling career
- Member Association: Denmark
- World Championship: 4 (2022, 2023, 2024, 2025)
- World Mixed Doubles Championship: 4 (2022, 2023, 2024, 2025)
- European Championship: 6 (2019, 2021, 2022, 2023, 2024, 2025)
- Olympic: 2 (2022, 2026)
- Other appearances: World Mixed Championship: 1 (2019), World Junior Championships: 1 (2020), World Junior-B Championships: 4 (2017, 2018, 2019 (Jan), 2019 (Dec))
Medal record
Women's Curling
Representing Denmark
European Curling Championships
Gold medal – first place	2022 Östersund

Jasmin Holtermann (born 4 February 2000 in Hvidovre as Jasmin Lander) is a Danish female curler.

== Personal life ==
Holtermann works as a medical laboratory technician. She is married to fellow curler Henrik Holtermann who she plays mixed doubles with.

== Teams ==
=== Women's ===
Season	Skip	Third	Second	Lead	Alternate	Coach	Events
2016–17	Jasmin Lander	Alberte Madsen	Katja Milvang-Jensen	Mie Milvang-Jensen	Caroline Jalo (WJCC)	Wagn Hoermark	DJCC 2017 (gold); WJBCC 2017 (15th)
2016–17	Jasmin Lander	Alberte Madsen	Ida Yong Iversen	Natalie Wiksten	Emine Erim		
2017–18	Jasmin Lander	Mie Milvang-Jensen	Alberte Madsen	Gabriella Qvist	Katja Milvang-Jensen		DJCC 2018 (gold)
2017–18	Jasmin Lander	Alberte Madsen	Gabriella Qvist	Mie Milvang-Jensen	Katja Milvang-Jensen	Lene Nielsen, Lars Vilandt	WJBCC 2018 (22nd)
2018–19	Mathilde Halse	Jasmin Lander	Gabriella Qvist	My Hollinger	Julie Jørgensen (WJBCC)	Mikael Qvist, Ulrik Schmidt	DJCC 2019 (gold); WJBCC 2019 (Jan) (5th)
2019–20	Mathilde Halse	Jasmin Lander	Karolina Jensen	My Larsen	Gabriella Qvist	Mikael Qvist	ECC 2019 (7th); WJBCC 2019 (Dec) (bronze); WJCC 2020 (6th)
2021–22	Madeleine Dupont	Mathilde Halse	Denise Dupont	My Larsen	Jasmin Lander	Heather Rogers	ECC 2021 (8th); WQE 2022 (gold); WOG 2022 (9th); WWCC 2022 (6th)
2022–23	Madeleine Dupont	Mathilde Halse	Denise Dupont	My Larsen	Jasmin Lander	Heather Rogers	ECC 2022 (gold); WWCC 2023 (11th)
2023–24	Madeleine Dupont	Mathilde Halse	Jasmin Lander	My Larsen	Denise Dupont	Ulrik Schmidt	ECC 2023 (7th); WWCC 2024 (6th)
2024–25	Madeleine Dupont	Mathilde Halse	Denise Dupont	My Larsen	Jasmin Holtermann	Ulrik Schmidt	ECC 2024 (5th); WWCC 2025 (7th)
2025–26	Madeleine Dupont	Mathilde Halse	Jasmin Holtermann	Denise Dupont	My Larsen	Ulrik Schmidt	ECC 2025 (5th); WOG 2026 (7th)

=== Mixed ===
Season	Skip	Third	Second	Lead	Events
2019–20	Tobias Thune	Jasmin Lander	Henrik Holtermann	My Larsen	WMxCC 2019 (5th)

=== Mixed doubles ===
Season	Female	Male	Coach	Events
2019–20	Jasmin Lander	Henrik Holtermann		
2021–22	Jasmin Lander	Henrik Holtermann	Kenneth Hertsdahl	OQE 2021 (7th)
2021–22	Jasmin Lander	Henrik Holtermann		DMDCC 2022 (silver)
2021–22	Jasmin Lander	Henrik Holtermann	Ulrik Schmidt	WMDCC 2022 (12th)
2022–23	Jasmin Lander	Henrik Holtermann	Ulrik Schmidt	DMDCC 2023 (gold); WMDCC 2023 (9th)
2023–24	Jasmin Lander	Henrik Holtermann	Ulrik Schmidt	WMDCC 2024 (14th)
2024–25	Jasmin Holtermann	Henrik Holtermann	Ulrik Schmidt	WMDCC 2025 (15th)
