= Denise Dupont =

Danish curler (born 1984)

- Curler
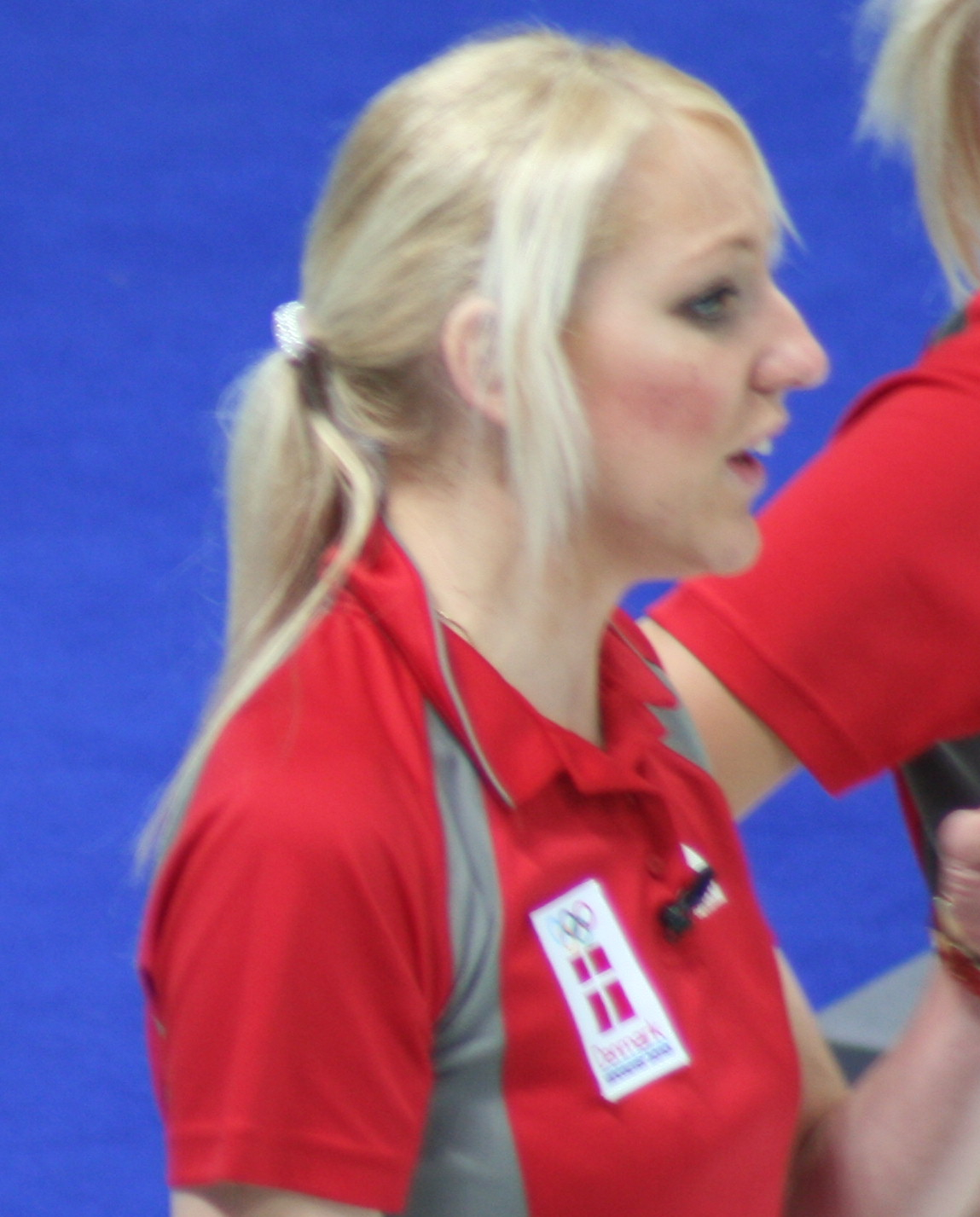
- Dupont at the 2010 Winter Olympics
- Born: 24 May 1984 (age 42); Copenhagen, Denmark

Team
- Curling club: Hvidovre CC, Hvidovre
- Skip: Madeleine Dupont
- Third: Mathilde Halse
- Second: Katrine Schmidt
- Lead: Denise Dupont
- Alternate: Jasmin Holtermann

Curling career
- Member Association: Denmark
- World Championship: 16 (2003, 2004, 2005, 2006, 2007, 2008, 2009, 2010, 2014, 2017, 2019, 2021, 2022, 2023, 2024, 2025)
- World Mixed Doubles Championship: 1 (2015)
- European Championship: 16 (2002, 2003, 2004, 2005, 2006, 2008, 2009, 2016, 2017, 2018, 2021, 2022, 2023, 2024, 2025, 2026)
- Olympic: 5 (2006, 2010, 2018, 2022, 2026)
Medal record
Women's curling
Representing Denmark
World Curling Championships
Silver medal – second place	2007 Aomori
Bronze medal – third place	2009 Gangneung
European Curling Championships
Gold medal – first place	2022 Östersund
Silver medal – second place	2002 Grindelwald
Bronze medal – third place	2003 Courmayeur
Bronze medal – third place	2005 Garmisch-Partenkirchen
Bronze medal – third place	2008 Örnsköldsvik
Bronze medal – third place	2009 Aberdeen

Denise Kanstrup Dupont (born 24 May 1984) is a Danish curler. She currently plays lead on the Danish National Women's Curling Team skipped by her sister Madeleine Dupont.

After several years of limited success in the Junior ranks, Dupont joined Dorthe Holm's team and was a member of the silver medal-winning European Curling Championships team in 2002. (Throwing second rocks). The following year, the team won a bronze medal. Her success at the European Championships never translated to Junior success or World Championship success at the time. In 2004, she was promoted to the third position, and the team won another bronze at the European Championships in 2005. She played third in the 2006 Olympics in Torino, Italy, where they finished 9th — following that, she left the team and joined up with Jensen. The new team succeeded at the 2007 World Women's Curling Championship, where they won silver. Denise Dupont returned to the world championships in 2008, where she played third for Angelina Jensen, finishing fifth after losing a tiebreaker to Japan's Moe Meguro.

== Personal life ==
Dupont was born in Copenhagen and lives in Dragør. She is employed as a teacher and child behaviour specialist and has two children. She is the sister of teammate Madeleine Dupont. She competed in the 2015 World Mixed Doubles Curling Championship with brother Oliver Dupont, just before that they also won 2015 Danish Mixed Doubles Curling Championship.

== Teammates ==
2007 Aomori World Championships

2008 Vernon World Championships

2009 Gangneung World Championships

Curling at the 2010 Winter Olympics 2010

Madeleine Dupont, fourth

Angelina Jensen, skip

Camilla Jensen, lead

Ane Hansen, alternate
