= Danish Junior Curling Championships =

The Danish Junior Curling Championships (Danish: Junior DM Herrer, Junior DM Damer) are the national championships of men's and women's junior curling teams in Denmark. Junior level curlers must be under the age of 21. The championships have been held annually since 1976 for junior men and since 1983 for junior women. The championships are organized by the Danish Curling Association (Danish: Dansk Curling Forbund).

== Past champions ==
Teams line-ups in order: fourth, third, second, lead, alternate; skips marked bold.

=== Men ===
| Year | Champions team | Runner up |
|---|---|---|
| 1976 | Hvidovre Curling Club (HCC, Hvidovre); Tommy Stjerne, Oluf Olsen, Steen Hansen, Peter Andersen | |
| 1977 | Rungsted Curling Klub (RCC); Lars Sundberg, ? Sundberg, Holger Slotsager, -?- | |
| 1978 | HCC; Tommy Stjerne, Oluf Olsen, Steen Hansen, Peter Andersen | |
| 1979 | HCC; Tommy Stjerne, Oluf Olsen, Steen Hansen, Peter Andersen | |
| 1980 | HCC; Jack Kjærulff, Lasse Lavrsen, Kim Dupont, Henrik Jakobsen | |
| 1981 | HCC; Jack Kjærulff, Lasse Lavrsen, Kim Dupont, Henrik Jakobsen | |
| 1982 | HCC; Jack Kjærulff, Lasse Lavrsen, Henrik Jakobsen, Bo Frank | |
| 1983 | HCC; Jack Kjærulff, Lasse Lavrsen, Henrik Jakobsen, Bo Frank | |
| 1984 | HCC; Ulrik Schmidt, Palle Poulsen, Anders Søderblom, Michael Petersen | |
| 1985 | RCK; Ole de Neergaard, Carsten Nyboe, Lars Torbensen, Anders Søderberg | |
| 1986 | Gentofte Curling Club (GCC, Gentofte); Jørgen Larsen, Michael Petersen, Carsten Nyboe, Brian Enggaard | |
| 1987 | GCC; Jørgen Larsen, Michael Petersen, Carsten Nyboe, Brian Enggaard | |
| 1988 | GCC; Torben Orla Nielsen, Brian Enggaard, Julich Wiberg, Christian Petri | |
| 1989 | ODIN; Brian Benkjær, Niels Christian Porskjær, Julich Wiberg, Christian Petri | |
| 1990 | RCK (3 players); Claus Pørtner, Brian Hansen, Søren Mikkelsen | |
| 1991 | Odense Curling Club (OCC, Odense); Torkil Svensgaard, Ulrik Damm, Peter Bull, Kenny Tordrup, Lasse Damm | |
| 1992 | OCC; Torkil Svensgaard, Ulrik Damm, Peter Bull, Kenny Tordrup, Lasse Damm | |
| 1993 | OCC; Torkil Svensgaard, Kenny Tordrup, Lasse Damm, Carsten Svensgaard, Rene Larsen | |
| 1994 | HCC; Johnny Frederiksen, Kenneth Hertsdahl, Lars Vilandt, Bo Jensen, Lars Nissen | |
| 1995 | HCC; Johnny Frederiksen, Bo Jensen, Lars Vilandt, Lars Nissen | |
| 1996 | HCC; Johnny Frederiksen, Bo Jensen, Lars Vilandt, Lars Nissen, Kasper Wiksten | |
| 1997 | HCC; Joel Ostrowski, Kenny Tordrup, Christian Hansen, David Zeuthen, Kim Sylvest Nielsen | |
| 1998 | HCC; Kasper Wiksten, Kenneth Daucke, Tim Kronholm, Sune Frederiksen | |
| 1999 | GCC; Casper Bossen, Kasper Wiksten, Kenneth Daucke, Kim Sylvest, Sune Frederiksen | |
| 2000 | GCC; Kasper Wiksten, Casper Bossen, Kim Sylvest, Sune Frederiksen, Morten Bærentsen | |
| 2001 | GCC; Casper Bossen, Kenneth Daucke, Kim Sylvest, Sune Frederiksen, Nicolai Frederiksen | |
| 2002 | GCC; Casper Bossen, Kenneth Daucke, Sune Frederiksen, Nicolai Frederiksen | |
| 2003 | GCC; Casper Bossen, Nicolai Frederiksen, Sune Frederiksen, Rasmus Rosquist, Rune Nebbelunde | |
| 2004 | HCC; Kenneth Jørgensen, Rasmus Stjerne, Mikkel Poulsen, Mikkel Krause, Dennis Hansen | |
| 2005 | HCC; Kenneth Jørgensen, Rasmus Stjerne, Mikkel Krause, Mikkel Poulsen, Dennis Hansen | |
| 2006 | HCC; Rasmus Stjerne, Mikkel Krause, Mikkel Poulsen, Dennis Hansen | |
| 2007 | HCC; Rasmus Stjerne, Mikkel Krause, Oliver Dupont, Troels Harry, Patrick Blom | |
| 2008 | HCC; Rasmus Stjerne, Mikkel Krause, Oliver Dupont, Troels Harry | |
| 2009 | HCC; Rasmus Stjerne, Mikkel Krause, Oliver Dupont, Troels Harry | |
| 2010 | HCC; Mikkel Krause, Oliver Dupont, Patrick Blom, Troels Harry | |
| 2011 | HCC; Mads Nørgård, Daniel Poulsen, Michael Hørmark, Nikolaj Maegaard, Alexander Behrndtz | |
| 2012 | GCC; Tobias Thune, Asmus Jørgensen, Thor Fehrenkamp, Fabin Thune, Oliver Søe | |
| 2013 | GCC; Tobias Thune, Asmus Jørgensen, Thor Fehrenkamp, Fabin Thune, Oliver Søe | |
| 2014 | Esbjerg Curling Klub (ECC, Esbjerg); Kasper Jørgensen, Nicklas Frederiksen, Simon Haubjerg, Oliver Kristoffersen | |
| 2015 | GCC; Tobias Thune, Mads Nørgård, Oliver Søe, Thor Fehrenkamp | |
| 2016 | SCC/HCC/GCC; Tobias Thune, Tobias Rasmussen, Henrik Holtermann, Nikolaj Skau, Simon Borregaard | |
| 2017 | ECC; Simon Haubjerg, Oliver Kristoffersen, Henrik Holtermann, Mads Bækdahl | |
| 2018 | HCC/ECC; Henrik Holtermann, Mads Bækdahl, Kilian Thune, Jonathan Vilandt, Simon Haubjerg | |
| 2019 | HCC; Simon Haubjerg, Jonathan Vilandt, Matthias Palmelund, Killian Thune, Mads Bækdahl | |
| 2020 | HCC/GCC; Jonathan Vilandt, Jacob Schmidt, Matthias Palmelund, Kilian Thune, Alexander Qvist | |
| 2021 | not held because COVID-19 | |
| 2022 | HCC/GCC; Jonathan Vilandt, Jacob Schmidt, Alexander Qvist, Kasper Bøge | TCC/GCC/HCC Oliver Rasmussen, Nikki Aaron Jensen, Liam Goldbeck, Nikolaj Schluckebier |

=== Women ===
| Year | Champions team |
|---|---|
| 1983 | Hvidovre Curling Club (HCC, Hvidovre); Helena Blach, Malene Krause, Jette Olsen, Lone Kristoffersen |
| 1984 | HCC; Helena Blach, Malene Krause, Annette Schött, Lillian Frøhling |
| 1985 | Gentofte Curling Club (GCC, Gentofte); Susanne Slotsager, Linda Laursen, Avijaja Nielsen, Kinnie Leth Steensen |
| 1986 | GCC; Susanne Slotsager, Linda Laursen, Avijaja Nielsen, Kinnie Leth Steensen |
| 1987 | Tårnby Curling Club (TCC, Tårnby); June Simonsen, Dorthe Holm, Pia Nielsen, Dorthe Andersen |
| 1988 | GCC; Lene Bidstrup, Linda Laursen, Avijaja Nielsen, Kinnie Leth Steensen |
| 1989 | TCC; June Simonsen, Dorthe Holm, Angelina Jensen, Dorthe Andersen |
| 1990 | TCC; June Simonsen, Dorthe Holm, Margit Pörtner, Helene Jensen |
| 1991 | TCC; June Simonsen, Dorthe Holm, Angelina Jensen, Helene Jensen |
| 1992 | TCC; Angelina Jensen, Dorthe Holm, Margit Pörtner, Helene Jensen |
| 1993 | TCC; Angelina Jensen, Dorthe Holm, Margit Pörtner, Helene Jensen |
| 1994 | TCC; Angelina Jensen, Dorthe Holm, Kamilla Schack, Helene Jensen, Charlotte Hedegaard |
| 1995 | GCC; Kamilla Schack, Birgitte Knudsen, Margit Ziegler, Helene Jensen |
| 1996 | GCC; Kamilla Schack, Birgitte Knudsen, Ane Hansen, Camilla Jensen |
| 1997 | TCC; Ane Hansen, Camilla Jensen, Trine Kronholm, Maria Christiansen, Iben Styr |
| 1998 | HCC; Louise Raun, Camilla Hansen, Camilla Jensen, Maria Christiansen, Mette Andersen |
| 1999 | HCC; Louise Jensen, Camilla Hansen, Mette Andersen, Camilla Jensen, Tanja Konradsen |
| 2000 | HCC; Madeleine Dupont, Denise Dupont, Helle Simonsen, Maria Poulsen, Sandra Gufler |
| 2001 | HCC; Madeleine Dupont, Denise Dupont, Helle Simonsen, Maria Poulsen, Sandra Gufler |
| 2002 | HCC; Madeleine Dupont, Denise Dupont, Lene Nielsen, Helle Simonsen, Maria Poulsen |
| 2003 | HCC; Nete Larsen, Camilla Jørgensen, Pernille Nielsen, Mette Larsen, Jeanne Ellegaard |
| 2004 | HCC; Madeleine Dupont, Denise Dupont, Lene Nielsen, Helle Simonsen, Maria Poulsen |
| 2005 | HCC; Madeleine Dupont, Denise Dupont, Lene Nielsen, Helle Simonsen, Maria Poulsen |
| 2006 | HCC; Lene Nielsen, Jeanne Ellegaard, Maria Poulsen, Helle Simonsen, Camilla Jørgensen |
| 2007 | TCC; Madeleine Dupont, Jeanne Ellegaard, Mona Sylvest Nielsen, Ivana Bratic, Lisa Sylvest Nielsen |
| 2008 | TCC; Madeleine Dupont, Jeanne Ellegaard, Mona Sylvest Nielsen, Ivana Bratic, Lisa Sylvest Nielsen |
| 2009 | HCC; Mette de Neergaard, Marie de Neergaard, Natasha Hinze Glenstrøm, Charlotte Clemmensen |
| 2010 | TCC; Jannie Gundry, Stephanie Risdal, Christine Svensen, ? |
| 2011 | TCC; Jannie Gundry, Stephanie Risdal, Christine Svensen, ? |
| 2012 | HCC; Stephanie Risdal, Jannie Gundry, Christine Svensen, Natacha Glenstrøm |
| 2013 | HCC; Stephanie Risdal, Jannie Gundry, Charlotte Clemmensen, Isabella Clemmensen, Julie Høgh, Catrine Edelskov |
| 2014 | HCC; Christine Svensen, Isabella Clemmensen, Julie Høgh, Charlotte Clemmensen |
| 2015 | HCC; Christine Svensen, Isabella Clemmensen, Julie Høgh, Katja Milvang-Jensen |
| 2016 | GCC; Mathilde Halse, Elizabeth Søndergaard-Nielsen, Anna Solberg, My Hollinger, Gabriella Qvist |
| 2017 | HCC; Jasmin Lander, Alberte Madsen, Katja Milvang-Jensen, Mie Milvang-Jensen |
| 2018 | HCC; Jasmin Lander, Mie Milvang-Jensen, Alberte Madsen, Gabriella Qvist, Katja Milvang-Jensen |
| 2019 | HCC/GCC; Mathilde Halse, Jasmin Lander, Gabriella Qvist, My Hollinger Larsen |
| 2020 | HCC/GCC; Mathilde Halse, Jasmin Lander, Karolina Jensen, My Hollinger Larsen, Gabriella Qvist |
| 2021 | not held because COVID-19 |
| 2022 | not held |
| 2023 | HCC/TCC/GCC Karolina Jensen, Gabriella Qvist, Natalie Wiksten, Katrine Schmidt, Maja Bidstrup |

== See also ==
- Danish Men's Curling Championship
- Danish Women's Curling Championship
- Danish Mixed Doubles Curling Championship
- Danish Mixed Curling Championship
