= Danish Mixed Curling Championship =

National championship of mixed curling in Denmark

The Danish Mixed Curling Championship is the national championship of mixed curling (two men and two women) in Denmark. It has been held annually since 1978.

== List of champions and medallists ==
(teams line-up in order: fourth, third, second, lead, alternate, coach; skips marked bold)

Year	Champion team (Curling club, city)	Team line-up
1978	ECK	Lars Nielsen, Ulla Petersen, Dieter Reuss, Lis Andersen
1980	Hvidovre CC (Hvidovre)	Per Berg, Helena Blach, Jan Hansen, Hanne Rasmussen
1981	HCC	Erling Jakobsen, Gitte Jakobsen, Antonny Hinge, Jytte Berg
1982	HCC	Tommy Stjerne, Lene Nielsen, Peter Andersen, Lone Kristoffersen
1983	HCC	Erik Kelnæs, Karen Eriksen, Antonny Hinge, Jytte Berg
1984	HCC	Per Berg, Helena Blach, Jan Hansen, Malene Krause
1985	HCC	Per Berg, Helena Blach, Hans Gufler, Malene Krause
1986	HCC	John Kjærulff, Astrid Birnbaum, Steen Hansen, Lone Kristoffersen
1987	HCC	Ulrik Schmidt, Lene Bidstrup, Henrik Jakobsen, Lillian Frøhling
1988	HCC	Ulrik Schmidt, Lene Bidstrup, Henrik Jakobsen, Lillian Frøhling
1989	Gentofte CC (Gentofte)	Christian Thune, Marie-Louise Siggaard Andersen, Niels Siggaard Andersen, Kinnie Leth Steensen
1990	GCC	Christian Thune, Dorthe Holm, Niels Siggaard Andersen, Marie-Louise Siggaard Andersen
1991	Tårnby CC (Tårnby)	Johannes Jensen, Angelina Jensen, Ulrik Damm, Kirsten Jensen
1992	HCC	Ulrik Schmidt, Dorthe Holm, Niels Siggaard Andersen, Lisa Richardson
1993	HCC	Bent Jørgensen, Jytte Berg, Antonny Hinge, Herdis Jørgensen
1994	HCC	Ulrik Schmidt, Dorthe Holm, Niels Siggaard Andersen, Lisa Richardson
1995	ECK	Tommy Kristoffersen, Anne Bensen, Tove Porskjær, Hans-Peter Schack
1996	TCC	Angelina Jensen, Lasse Legaard, Lone Christiansen, Ronni Legaard
1997	HCC	Helena Blach Lavrsen, Lasse Lavrsen, Margit Pörtner, Brian Hansen
1998	GCC	Mikael Qvist, Trine Qvist, Hans Peter-Schack, Linette Henningsen
1999	HCC	Johnny Frederiksen, Louise Raun Jensen, Kenneth Hertsdahl, Camilla Hansen
2000	TCC	Angelina Jensen, Lasse Legaard, Camilla Jensen, Ronni Legaard, Charlotte Hedegaard
2001	HCC	Gert Larsen, Nete Larsen, Mikkel Krause, Gitte Larsen
2002	HCC	Gert Larsen, Pernille Nielsen, Dennis Hansen, Mette Larsen
2003	HCC	Johnny Frederiksen, Nete Larsen, Kenneth Daucke, Pernille Nielsen, Lars Vilandt
2004	HCC	Madeleine Dupont, Mikkel Krause, Denise Dupont, Dennis Hansen
2005	HCC	Ulrik Schmidt, Dorthe Holm, Lasse Lavrsen, Lisa Richardson
2006	HCC	Rasmus Stjerne, Camilla Jørgensen, Mikkel Krause, Maria Poulsen
2007	TCC/HCC	Madeleine Dupont, Mikkel Krause, Jeanne Ellegaard, Oliver Dupont
2008	TCC	Joel Ostrowski, Camilla Jensen, Søren Jensen, Jeanne Ellegaard
2009	TCC	Joel Ostrowski, Camilla Jensen, Søren Jensen, Mona Sylvest Nielsen
2010	GCC	Mikael Qvist, Mona Sylvest Nielsen, Niels Siggard Andersen, Trine Qvist
2011	GCC	Mikael Qvist, Trine Qvist, Are Solberg, Kirsten Jensen
2012	TCC	Joel Ostrowski, Camilla Jensen, Søren Jensen, Pavla Rubasova
2013	HCC	Madeleine Dupont, Mikkel Krause, Denise Dupont, Dennis Hansen
2014	GCC	Mikael Qvist, Trine Qvist, Are Solberg, Mathilde Halse
2015	TCC	Madeleine Dupont, Mikkel Krause, Denise Dupont, Ulrik Damm
2016	GCC	Mikael Qvist, Trine Qvist, Alexander Qvist, Gabriella Qvist
2017	GCC	Mikael Qvist, Trine Qvist, Alexander Qvist, Gabriella Qvist
2018	GCC/TCC	Mads Nørgaard, Camilla Jensen, Asmus Jørgensen, Lina Knudsen
2019	HCC	Johnny Frederiksen, Madeleine Dupont, Oliver Dupont, Denise Dupont
2020, 2021	Cancelled due to the COVID-19 pandemic in Denmark	
2022	GCC	Mikael Qvist, Trine Qvist, Alexander Qvist, Gabriella Qvist
2023	TCC	Karolina Jensen, Christian Karger, Natalie Wiksten, Nikki Jensen
2024	Team Krause (GCC/HCC)	Mikkel Krause, Jasmin Lander, Henrik Holtermann, Signe Schack
2025	Team Landmann (HCC)	Henrik Holtermann, Emilie Holtermann, Henrik Lander, Charlotte Holtermann
2026	Team Junior blandet (HCC/GCC/TCC)	Liam Goldbeck, Katrine Schmidt, Nikki Jensen, Ninne Vilandt
2027	Team Aarhus Aalborg United (Aarhus CK/Aalborg CK)	Thorbjørn Jackholm, Jennie Schneider, Håkan Lindell, Neea Oja

== Medal record for curlers ==
(after 2019 championship)

Curler	Gold	Silver	Bronze
Mikkel Krause	6		
Mikael Qvist	6		
Trine Qvist	6		
Niels Siggaard Andersen	5		
Madeleine Dupont	5		
Camilla Jensen	5		
Ulrik Schmidt	5		
Denise Dupont	4		
Dorthe Holm	4		
Helena Blach Lavrsen	4		
Jytte Berg	3		
Per Berg	3		
Johnny Frederiksen	3		
Dennis Hansen	3		
Antonny Hinge	3		
Angelina Jensen	3		
Søren Jensen	3		
Joel Ostrowski	3		
Lisa Richardson	3		
Marie-Louise Siggaard Andersen	2		
Lene Bidstrup	2		
Ulrik Damm	2		
Oliver Dupont	2		
Jeanne Ellegaard	2		
Lillian Frøhling	2		
Jan Hansen	2		
Henrik Jakobsen	2		
Kirsten Jensen	2		
Malene Krause	2		
Lone Kristoffersen	2		
Gert Larsen	2		
Nete Larsen	2		
Lasse Lavrsen	2		
Lasse Legaard	2		
Ronni Legaard	2		
Mona Sylvest Nielsen	2		
Pernille Nielsen	2		
Alexander Qvist	2		
Gabriella Qvist	2		
Hans-Peter Schack	2		
Are Solberg	2		
Christian Thune	2		

Curler	Gold	Silver	Bronze
Lis Andersen	1		
Peter Andersen	1		
Anne Bensen	1		
Astrid Birnbaum	1		
Lone Christiansen	1		
Kenneth Daucke	1		
Karen Eriksen	1		
Hans Gufler	1		
Mathilde Halse	1		
Brian Hansen	1		
Camilla Hansen	1		
Steen Hansen	1		
Charlotte Hedegaard	1		
Linette Henningsen	1		
Kenneth Hertsdahl	1		
Erling Jakobsen	1		
Gitte Jakobsen	1		
Johannes Jensen	1		
Louise Raun Jensen	1		
Asmus Jørgensen	1		
Bent Jørgensen	1		
Camilla Jørgensen	1		
Herdis Jørgensen	1		
Erik Kelnæs	1		
John Kjærulff	1		
Lina Knudsen	1		
Tommy Kristoffersen	1		
Gitte Larsen	1		
Mette Larsen	1		
Lars Nielsen	1		
Lene Nielsen	1		
Mads Nørgaard	1		
Ulla Petersen	1		
Tove Porskjær	1		
Maria Poulsen	1		
Margit Pörtner	1		
Hanne Rasmussen	1		
Dieter Reuss	1		
Pavla Rubasova	1		
Kinnie Leth Steensen	1		
Rasmus Stjerne	1		
Tommy Stjerne	1		
Lars Vilandt	1		

== See also ==
- Danish Men's Curling Championship
- Danish Women's Curling Championship
- Danish Mixed Doubles Curling Championship
- Danish Junior Curling Championships
- Danish Senior Curling Championships
