= Kasper Wiksten =

Danish curler (born 1980)

- Curler
- Born: 9 June 1980 (age 46); Hvidovre, Denmark

Team
- Curling club: Esbjerg Curling Klub, Esbjerg, Hvidovre CC, Hvidovre, DEN
- Skip: Tobias Thune
- Third: Kasper Wiksten
- Second: Oliver Rosenkrands Søe
- Lead: Daniel Poulsen
- Alternate: Mikkel Krause
- Mixed doubles partner: Natalie Wiksten

Curling career
- Member Association: Denmark
- World Championship: 2 (2021, 2022)
- World Mixed Doubles Championship: 1 (2017)
- European Championship: 3 (2018, 2019, 2021
- Olympic: 1 (2022)
- Other appearances: World Junior Championships: 4 (1996, 1998, 2000)

Kasper Wiksten (born 9 June 1980, in Hvidovre Municipality) is a Danish curler.

At the national level, he is Danish men's champion curler (2020), Danish mixed doubles champion curler (2020) and a four-time Danish junior champion curler (1996, 1998, 1999, 2000).

== Teams ==
=== Men's ===
Season	Skip	Third	Second	Lead	Alternate	Coach	Events
1995–96	Johnny Frederiksen	Bo Jensen	Lars Vilandt	Lars Nissen	Kasper Wiksten		DJCC 1996 (gold); WJCC 1996 (9th)
1997–98	Kasper Wiksten	Kenneth Daucke Andersen	Tim Kronholm	Sune Frederiksen	Mikael Lohman Jensen (WJCC)		DJCC 1998 (gold); WJCC 1998 (9th)
1998–99	Casper Bossen	Kasper Wiksten	Kenneth Daucke	Kim Sylvest	Sune Frederiksen		DJCC 1999 (gold)
1999–00	Kasper Wiksten	Casper Bossen	Kim Sylvest Nielsen	Sune Frederiksen	Morten Bærentsen	Olle Brudsten (WJCC), Finn Nielsen (WJCC)	DJCC 2000 (gold); WJCC 2000 (4th)
2016–17	Ulrik Damm	Kasper Wiksten	Daniel Abrahamsen	Kasper Jørgensen			
2017–18	Ulrik Damm	Kasper Wiksten	Daniel Abrahamsen	Kasper Jørgensen			
2018–19	Daniel Poulsen	Kasper Wiksten	Tobias Engelhard Rasmussen	Daniel Munk Buchholt	Mads Nørgård	Mikael Qvist	ECC 2018 (11th)
2018–19	Ulrik Damm	Kasper Wiksten	Daniel Abrahamsen	Kasper Jørgensen	Daniel Buchholt	Mikael Qvist	WQE 2019 (7 место)
2019–20	Mikkel Krause	Mads Nørgård	Tobias Engelhardt	Henrik Holtermann	Kasper Wiksten	Gert Larsen	ECC 2019 (4th)
2019–20	Tobias Thune	Kasper Wiksten	Daniel Poulsen	Oliver Søe			DMCC 2020 (gold)
2020–21	Mikkel Krause (fourth)	Tobias Thune	Mads Nørgård (skip)	Kasper Wiksten	Oliver Rosenkrands Søe	Kenneth Hertsdahl	WCC 2021 (11th)
2021–22	Mikkel Krause	Mads Nørgård	Henrik Holtermann	Kasper Wiksten	Tobias Thune	Kenneth Hertsdahl, Jasmin Lander (ECC)	ECC 2021 (6th); OQE 2021 (bronze)

=== Mixed doubles ===
Season	Female	Male	Coach	Events
2016–17	Natalie Asp Wiksten	Kasper Wiksten	Per Svensen	WMDCC 2017 (30th)
2017–18	Natalie Wiksten	Kasper Wiksten		
2018–19	Natalie Wiksten	Kasper Wiksten		
2019–20	Natalie Wiksten	Kasper Wiksten		DMDCC 2020 (gold)
2020–21	Natalie Wiksten	Kasper Wiksten		
2021–22	Natalie Wiksten	Kasper Wiksten		
2022–23	Natalie Wiksten	Kasper Wiksten		DMDCC 2023 (4th)
2024–25	Natalie Wiksten	Kasper Wiksten		DMDCC 2025 (2nd)
2025–26	Natalie Wiksten	Kasper Wiksten		

== Personal life ==
His daughter Natalie Wiksten is also a curler; together they played on World mixed doubles championship 2017 (12-y.o. Natalie was the youngest player in history of all "adult" world curling championships) and won gold on 2020 Danish MD championship.
