= Lillian Frøhling =

Danish curler

- Curler ♀
- Born: 22 November 1964 (age 61)

Team
- Curling club: Gentofte CC, Gentofte, Hvidovre CC, Hvidovre

Curling career
- Member Association: Denmark
- World Championship: 2 (1989, 1999)
- European Championship: 2 (1987, 2002)
- Other appearances: World Senior Championships: 1 (2019), European Junior Championships: 1 (1984)
Medal record
Curling
Representing Denmark
World Championships
Bronze medal – third place	1999 Saint John
European Championships
Silver medal – second place	2002 Grindelwald
Danish Women's Championship
Gold medal – first place	1989
Gold medal – first place	1993
Gold medal – first place	1999

Lillian Frøhling Hansen (born 22 November 1964 as Lillian Frøhling) is a Danish female curler.

She is a 1999 World women's bronze medallist and 2002 European silver medallist.

== Teams ==
=== Women's ===
Season	Skip	Third	Second	Lead	Alternate	Coach	Events
1983–84	Helena Blach	Malene Krause	Annette Schøtt	Lilian Frøhling			DJCC 1984 (gold); EJCC 1984 (6th)
1987–88	Marianne Qvist	Lene Bidstrup	Astrid Birnbaum	Lilian Frøhling			ECC 1987 (9th)
1988–89	Marianne Qvist	Lene Bidstrup	Astrid Birnbaum	Lilian Frøhling			DWCC 1989 (gold); WCC 1989 (8th)
1992–93	Marianne Qvist	Marie-Louise Siggaard Andersen	Lilian Frøhling	Rikke Roungkvist			DWCC 1993 (gold)
1998–99	Lene Bidstrup	Malene Krause	Susanne Slotsager	Avijaja Petri	Lilian Frøhling	Jane Bidstrup	DWCC 1999 (gold); WCC 1999 (bronze)
2002–03	Dorthe Holm	Malene Krause	Denise Dupont	Lilian Frøhling	Madeleine Dupont	Mikael Qvist	ECC 2002 (silver)
2018–19	Lene Bidstrup Nyboe	Susanne Slotsager	Trine Qvist	Lillian Frøhling Hansen		Gabriella Qvist	DSCC 2019 (gold); WSCC 2019 (silver)

=== Mixed ===
Season	Skip	Third	Second	Lead	Events
1987	Ulrik Schmidt	Lene Bidstrup	Henrik Jakobsen	Lillian Frøhling	DMxCC 1987 (gold)
1988	Ulrik Schmidt	Lene Bidstrup	Henrik Jakobsen	Lillian Frøhling	DMxCC 1988 (gold)
