= Henrik Jakobsen (curler) =

Danish male curler

- Curler ♂

Team
- Curling club: Hvidovre CC, Hvidovre

Curling career
- Member Association: Denmark
- World Championship: 5 (1991, 1993, 1994, 2001, 2004)
- European Championship: 3 (1987, 1991, 1994)
- Other appearances: World Junior Championships: 4 (1980, 1981, 1982, 1983)
Medal record
Curling
Danish Men's Championship
Gold medal – first place	1991
Gold medal – first place	1993
Gold medal – first place	1994
Gold medal – first place	1995
Gold medal – first place	2001
Gold medal – first place	2004
Gold medal – first place	2005

Henrik Jakobsen is a Danish curler.

At the national level, he is a seven-time Danish men's champion curler (1991, 1993, 1994, 1995, 2001, 2004, 2005), a two-time Danish mixed champion curler (1987, 1988) and a four-time Danish junior champion curler (1980, 1981, 1982, 1983).

== Teams ==
=== Men's ===
Season	Skip	Third	Second	Lead	Alternate	Coach	Events
1979–80	Jack Kjaerulf	Lasse Lavrsen	Kim Dupont	Henrik Jakobsen			DJCC 1980 (gold); WJCC 1980 (6th)
1980–81	Jack Kjaerulf	Lasse Lavrsen	Kim Dupont	Henrik Jakobsen			DJCC 1981 (gold); WJCC 1981 (6th)
1981–82	Jack Kjaerulf	Lasse Lavrsen	Henrik Jakobsen	Bo Frank			DJCC 1982 (gold); WJCC 1982 (9th)
1982–83	Jack Kjaerulf	Lasse Lavrsen	Henrik Jakobsen	Bo Frank			DJCC 1983 (gold); WJCC 1983 (5th)
1987–88	Sören Bang	Henrik Jakobsen	Lasse Lavrsen	Ulrik Schmidt	Michael Harry		ECC 1987 (5th)
1990–91	Christian Thune	Niels Siggaard	Henrik Jakobsen	Lasse Lavrsen	Anders Søderblom (WCC)		DMCC 1991 (gold); WCC 1991 (8th)
1991–92	Gert Larsen	Oluf Olsen	Michael Harry	Henrik Jakobsen	Ulrik Schmidt		ECC 1991 (6th)
1992–93	Gert Larsen	Oluf Olsen	Michael Harry	Henrik Jakobsen	Tom Nielsen		DMCC 1993 (gold); WCC 1993 (5th)
1993–94	Gert Larsen	Oluf Olsen	Michael Harry	Henrik Jakobsen	Tom Nielsen (DMCC), Tommy Stjerne (WCC)		DMCC 1994 (gold); WCC 1994 (7th)
1994–95	Gert Larsen	Oluf Olsen	Michael Harry	Henrik Jakobsen	Tom Nielsen		ECC 1994 (10th); DMCC 1995 (gold)
2000–01	Johnny Frederiksen	Henrik Jakobsen	Lars Vilandt	Bo Jensen	Gert Larsen	Olle Brudsten	DMCC 2001 (gold); WCC 2001 (10th)
2003–04	Johnny Frederiksen	Lars Vilandt	Kenneth Daucke	Bo Jensen	Henrik Jakobsen		DMCC 2004 (gold); WCC 2004 (8th)
2004–05	Johnny Frederiksen	Lars Vilandt	Bo Jensen	Kenneth Daucke	Henrik Jakobsen		DMCC 2005 (gold)

=== Mixed ===
Season	Skip	Third	Second	Lead	Events
1986–87	Ulrik Schmidt	Lene Bidstrup	Henrik Jakobsen	Lillian Frøhling	DMxCC 1987 (gold)
1987–88	Ulrik Schmidt	Lene Bidstrup	Henrik Jakobsen	Lillian Frøhling	DMxCC 1988 (gold)
