= Gert Larsen =

Danish male curler and coach

- Curler ♂
- Born: 9 February 1960 (age 66); Hvidovre

Team
- Curling club: Hvidovre CC, Hvidovre

Curling career
- Member Association: Denmark
- World Championship: 7 (1982, 1987, 1988, 1993, 1994, 1998, 2001)
- European Championship: 3 (1979, 1980, 1981, 1991, 1994, 1998)
- Olympic: 1 (1988, demonstration)
Medal record
Curling
European Championships
Bronze medal – third place	1981 Grindelwald
Danish Men's Championship
Gold medal – first place	1979
Gold medal – first place	1982
Gold medal – first place	1987
Gold medal – first place	1988
Gold medal – first place	1993
Gold medal – first place	1994
Gold medal – first place	1995
Gold medal – first place	1997
Gold medal – first place	1998
Gold medal – first place	2001

Gert Munch Larsen (born 9 February 1960 in Hvidovre) is a Danish curler and curling coach.

At the international level, he is a 1981 European bronze medallist.

At the national level, he is a ten-time Danish men's champion curler (1979, 1982, 1987, 1988, 1993, 1994, 1995, 1997, 1998, 2001) and a two-time Danish mixed champion curler (2001, 2002).

He participated at the demonstration event at the 1988 Winter Olympics, where Danish men's team finished sixth. As a coach of Danish women's curling team he participated at the 2014 Winter Olympics, where Danish women's team finished sixth.

== Awards ==
- Collie Campbell Memorial Award: 1994.

== Teams ==
=== Men's ===
Season	Skip	Third	Second	Lead	Alternate	Coach	Events
1978–79	Per Berg	Gert Larsen	Jan Hansen	Michael Harry			DMCC 1979 (gold)
1979–80	Per Berg	Gert Larsen	Jan Hansen	Michael Harry			ECC 1979 (6th)
1980–81	Per Berg	Gert Larsen	Jan Hansen	Michael Harry			ECC 1980 (6th)
1981–82	Per Berg	Gert Larsen	Jan Hansen	Michael Harry		Antonny Hinge	ECC 1981 (bronze); DMCC 1982 (gold); WCC 1982 (8th)
1986–87	Gert Larsen	Oluf Olsen	Jan Hansen	Michael Harry			DMCC 1987 (gold); WCC 1987 (4th)
1987–88	Gert Larsen	Oluf Olsen	Jan Hansen	Michael Harry			WOG 1988, demo (6th); DMCC 1988 (gold); WCC 1988 (8th)
1991–92	Gert Larsen	Oluf Olsen	Michael Harry	Henrik Jakobsen	Ulrik Schmidt		ECC 1991 (6th)
1992–93	Gert Larsen	Oluf Olsen	Michael Harry	Henrik Jakobsen	Tom Nielsen		DMCC 1993 (gold); WCC 1993 (5th)
1993–94	Gert Larsen	Oluf Olsen	Michael Harry	Henrik Jakobsen	Tom Nielsen (DMCC), Tommy Stjerne (WCC)		DMCC 1994 (gold); WCC 1994 (7th)
1994–95	Gert Larsen	Oluf Olsen	Michael Harry	Henrik Jakobsen	Tom Nielsen		ECC 1994 (10th); DMCC 1995 (gold)
1996–97	Tommy Stjerne	Gert Larsen	Peter Andersen	Anders Søderblom	Ivan Frederiksen		DMCC 1997 (gold)
1997–98	Tommy Stjerne	Gert Larsen	Peter Andersen	Ivan Frederiksen	Anders Søderblom		DMCC 1998 (gold); WCC 1998 (7th)
1998–99	Tommy Stjerne	Gert Larsen	Peter Andersen	Ivan Frederiksen	Anders Søderblom	Mikael Qvist, Olle Brudsten	ECC 1998 (7th)
2000–01	Johnny Frederiksen	Henrik Jakobsen	Lars Vilandt	Bo Jensen	Gert Larsen	Olle Brudsten	DMCC 2001 (gold); WCC 2001 (10th)

=== Mixed ===
Season	Skip	Third	Second	Lead	Events
2000–01	Gert Larsen	Nete Larsen	Mikkel Krause	Gitte Larsen	DMxCC 2001 (gold)
2001–02	Gert Larsen	Pernille Nielsen	Dennis Hansen	Mette Larsen	DMxCC 2002 (gold)

== Record as a coach of national teams ==
Year	Tournament, event	National team	Place
2005	2005 European Junior Curling Challenge	Denmark (junior men)	1st place, gold medalist(s)
2005	2005 European Curling Championships	Denmark (men)	6
2005	2005 European Curling Championships	Denmark (women)	3rd place, bronze medalist(s)
2006	2006 World Junior Curling Championships	Denmark (junior men)	5
2007	2007 World Junior Curling Championships	Denmark (junior men)	4
2008	2008 World Junior Curling Championships	Denmark (junior men)	7
2009	2009 World Junior Curling Championships	Denmark (junior men)	1st place, gold medalist(s)
2013	2013 European Curling Championships	Denmark (women)	4
2014	2014 Winter Olympics	Denmark (women)	6
2014	2014 European Curling Championships	Denmark (men)	9
2019	2019 European Curling Championships	Denmark (men)	4

== Private life ==
He is married to fellow Danish curler Malene Krause. They are the parents of former world junior champion Mikkel Krause, skip of Denmark's team at the 2022 Winter Olympic Games. Larsen was coach of his son's 2009 World Junior Curling Championships winner.
