= Kenneth Daucke Andersen =

Danish male curler

- Curler ♂

Team
- Curling club: Hvidovre CC, Hvidovre

Curling career
- Member Association: Denmark
- World Championship: 1 (2004)
- Other appearances: World Junior Championships: 3 (1998, 2001, 2002)
Medal record
Curling
World Junior Championships
Silver medal – second place	2001 Ogden
Danish Men's Championship
Gold medal – first place	2004
Gold medal – first place	2005

Kenneth Daucke Andersen (also known as Kenneth Daucke) is a Danish curler.

At the national level, he is a two-time Danish men's champion curler (2004, 2005) and a 2003 Danish mixed champion curler.

== Teams ==
=== Men's ===
Season	Skip	Third	Second	Lead	Alternate	Coach	Events
1997–98	Kasper Wiksten	Kenneth Daucke Andersen	Tim Kronholm	Sune Frederiksen	Mikael Lohman Jensen		WJCC 1998 (9th)
2000–01	Casper Bossen	Kenneth Daucke Andersen	Kim Sylvest Nielsen	Sune Frederiksen	Nicolai Frederiksen	Finn Nielsen	WJCC 2001 (silver)
2001–02	Casper Bossen	Kenneth Daucke Andersen	Sune Frederiksen	Nicolai Frederiksen	Kenneth Jørgensen	Olle Brudsten	WJCC 2002 (7th)
2003–04	Johnny Frederiksen	Lars Vilandt	Bo Jensen	Kenneth Daucke	Henrik Jakobsen		DMCC 2004 (gold)
2003–04	Johnny Frederiksen	Lars Vilandt	Kenneth Daucke Andersen	Bo Jensen	Henrik Jakobsen		WCC 2004 (8th)
2004–05	Johnny Frederiksen	Lars Vilandt	Bo Jensen	Kenneth Daucke	Henrik Jakobsen		DMCC 2005 (gold)

=== Mixed ===
Season	Skip	Third	Second	Lead	Alternate	Events
2002–03	Johnny Frederiksen	Nete Larsen	Kenneth Daucke	Pernille Nielsen	Lars Vilandt	DMxCC 2003 (gold)
