= Lasse Lavrsen =

Danish male curler and coach

- Curler ♂
- Born: 11 January 1963 (age 63); Hvidovre, Denmark

Team
- Curling club: Hvidovre CC, Hvidovre

Curling career
- Member Association: Denmark
- World Championship: 7 (1991, 1997, 1999, 2000, 2002, 2003, 2006)
- European Championship: 10 (1987, 1996, 1997, 1999, 2000, 2001, 2002, 2003, 2004, 2005)
- Olympic: 1 (2002)
- Other appearances: World Junior Championships: 4 (1980, 1981, 1982, 1983)
Medal record
Curling
European Championships
Silver medal – second place	1997 Füssen
Silver medal – second place	1999 Chamonix
Silver medal – second place	2000 Oberstdorf
Bronze medal – third place	2003 Courmayeur
Danish Men's Championship
Gold medal – first place	1991
Gold medal – first place	1996
Gold medal – first place	1999
Gold medal – first place	2000
Gold medal – first place	2002
Gold medal – first place	2003
Gold medal – first place	2006

Lasse Lavrsen (born 11 January 1963) is a Danish curler and curling coach, a three-time European silver medallist and seven-time Danish men's champion.

He participated at the 2002 Winter Olympics where the Danish men's team finished in seventh place.

== Teams ==
=== Men's ===
Season	Skip	Third	Second	Lead	Alternate	Coach	Events
1979–80	Jack Kjaerulf	Lasse Lavrsen	Kim Dupont	Henrik Jakobsen			DJCC 1980 (gold); WJCC 1980 (6th)
1980–81	Jack Kjaerulf	Lasse Lavrsen	Kim Dupont	Henrik Jakobsen			DJCC 1981 (gold); WJCC 1981 (6th)
1981–82	Jack Kjaerulf	Lasse Lavrsen	Henrik Jakobsen	Bo Frank			DJCC 1982 (gold); WJCC 1982 (9th)
1982–83	Jack Kjaerulf	Lasse Lavrsen	Henrik Jakobsen	Bo Frank			DJCC 1983 (gold); WJCC 1983 (5th)
1987–88	Sören Bang	Henrik Jakobsen	Lasse Lavrsen	Ulrik Schmidt	Michael Harry		ECC 1987 (5th)
1990–91	Christian Thune	Niels Siggaard	Henrik Jakobsen	Lasse Lavrsen	Anders Søderblom (WCC)		DMCC 1991 (gold); WCC 1991 (8th)
1995–96	Ulrik Schmidt	Lasse Lavrsen	Ulrik Damm	Brian Hansen			DMCC 1996 (gold)
1996–97	Ulrik Schmidt	Lasse Lavrsen	Brian Hansen	Ulrik Damm	Carsten Svensgaard (WCC)	Frants Gufler (ECC), Bill Carey (WCC)	ECC 1996 (5th); WCC 1997 (6th)
1997–98	Ulrik Schmidt	Lasse Lavrsen	Brian Hansen	Carsten Svensgaard		Bill Carey	ECC 1997 (silver)
1998–99	Ulrik Schmidt	Lasse Lavrsen	Brian Hansen	Carsten Svensgaard	Frants Gufler	Bill Carey	DMCC 1999 (gold); WCC 1999 (6th)
1999–00	Ulrik Schmidt	Lasse Lavrsen	Brian Hansen	Carsten Svensgaard	Bo Jensen (ECC); Frants Gufler (DMCC, WCC)	Bill Carey	ECC 1999 (silver); DMCC 2000 (gold); WCC 2000 (5th)
2000–01	Ulrik Schmidt	Lasse Lavrsen	Brian Hansen	Carsten Svensgaard	Frants Gufler	Bill Carey	ECC 2000 (silver)
2001–02	Lasse Lavrsen	Brian Hansen	Carsten Svensgaard	Frants Gufler	Ulrik Schmidt	Bill Carey	ECC 2001 (6th)
2001–02	Ulrik Schmidt	Lasse Lavrsen	Brian Hansen	Carsten Svensgaard	Frants Gufler		WOG 2002 (7th)
2001–02	Ulrik Schmidt	Lasse Lavrsen	Carsten Svensgaard	Joel Ostrowski			DMCC 2002 (gold)
2001–02	Ulrik Schmidt	Lasse Lavrsen	Carsten Svensgaard	Bo Jensen	Joel Ostrowski	Olle Brudsten	WCC 2002 (5th)
2002–03	Ulrik Schmidt	Lasse Lavrsen	Carsten Svensgaard	Joel Ostrowski	Christian Hansen	Bill Carey, Tracy Choptain	ECC 2002 (5th); DMCC 2003 (gold); WCC 2003 (6th)
2003–04	Ulrik Schmidt	Lasse Lavrsen	Carsten Svensgaard	Joel Ostrowski	Torkil Svensgaard		ECC 2003 (bronze)
2004–05	Ulrik Schmidt	Lasse Lavrsen	Carsten Svensgaard	Joel Ostrowski	Torkil Svensgaard	Avijaja Lund Järund	ECC 2004 (6th)
2005–06	Ulrik Schmidt	Lasse Lavrsen	Carsten Svensgaard	Joel Ostrowski	Kenneth Jørgensen (ECC)	Gert Larsen (ECC), Avijaja Lund Järund (ECC)	ECC 2005 (6th); DMCC 2006 (gold)
2005–06	Ulrik Schmidt	Lasse Lavrsen	Carsten Svensgaard	Joel Ostrowski	Kenneth Jørgensen	Bill Carey, Tracy Choptain	WCC 2006 (8th)

=== Mixed ===
Season	Skip	Third	Second	Lead	Events
1996–97	Helena Blach Lavrsen	Lasse Lavrsen	Margit Pörtner	Brian Hansen	DMxCC 1997 (gold)
2004–05	Ulrik Schmidt	Dorthe Holm	Lasse Lavrsen	Lisa Richardson	DMxCC 2005 (gold)

== Record as a coach of national teams ==
Year	Tournament, event	National team	Place
2006	2006 Winter Olympics	Denmark (women)	8
2007	2007 European Curling Championships	Denmark (women)	3rd place, bronze medalist(s)
2010	2010 European Curling Championships	Denmark (women)	5
2011	2011 World Women's Curling Championship	Denmark (women)	4
2011	2011 European Curling Championships	Denmark (women)	4
2012	2012 World Women's Curling Championship	Denmark (women)	8
2012	2012 European Curling Championships	Denmark (women)	4
2013	2013 World Women's Curling Championship	Denmark (women)	8
