= Peter Andersen (Danish curler) =

Danish male curler

- Curler ♂
- Born: 21 December 1957 (age 68)

Team
- Curling club: Hvidovre CC, Hvidovre

Curling career
- Member Association: Denmark
- World Championship: 8 (1977, 1981, 1983, 1986, 1989, 1990, 1998, 2011)
- European Championship: 8 (1978, 1985, 1986, 1990, 1992, 1993, 1995, 1998)
- Other appearances: World Junior Championships: 3 (1976, 1978, 1979)
Medal record
Curling
World Championships
Bronze medal – third place	1990 Västerås
European Championships
Silver medal – second place	1993 Leukerbad
Bronze medal – third place	1978 Aviemore
Danish Men's Championship
Gold medal – first place	1977
Gold medal – first place	1981
Gold medal – first place	1983
Gold medal – first place	1986
Gold medal – first place	1989
Gold medal – first place	1990
Gold medal – first place	1992
Gold medal – first place	1997
Gold medal – first place	1998
Gold medal – first place	2011

Peter Andersen (born 21 December 1957) is a Danish curler.

He is a 1990 World Men's bronze medallist.

== Teams ==
=== Men's ===
Season	Skip	Third	Second	Lead	Alternate	Coach	Events
1975–76	Tommy Stjerne	Oluf Olsen	Peter Andersen	Steen Hansen			DJCC 1976 (gold); WJCC 1976 (9th)
1976–77	Tommy Stjerne	Oluf Olsen	Steen Hansen	Peter Andersen			DMCC 1977 (gold); WCC 1977 (10th)
1977–78	Tommy Stjerne	Oluf Olsen	Steen Hansen	Peter Andersen			DJCC 1978 (gold); WJCC 1978 (8th)
1978–79	Tommy Stjerne	Oluf Olsen	Steen Hansen	Peter Andersen			ECC 1978 (bronze); DJCC 1979 (gold); WJCC 1979 (6th)
1980–81	Tommy Stjerne	Oluf Olsen	Steen Hansen	Peter Andersen			DMCC 1981 (gold); WCC 1981 (9th)
1982–83	Tommy Stjerne	Oluf Olsen	Steen Hansen	Peter Andersen			DMCC 1983 (gold); WCC 1983 (7th)
1985–86	Tommy Stjerne	Per Berg	Peter Andersen	Ivan Frederiksen	Michael Harry (WCC)		ECC 1985 (4th); DMCC 1986 (gold); WCC 1986 (8th)
1986–87	Tommy Stjerne	Per Berg	Peter Andersen	Ivan Frederiksen			ECC 1986 (7th)
1988–89	Tommy Stjerne	Per Berg	Peter Andersen	Anders Søderblom	Ivan Frederiksen		DMCC 1989 (gold); WCC 1989 (6th)
1989–90	Tommy Stjerne	Per Berg	Peter Andersen	Ivan Frederiksen	Anders Søderblom		DMCC 1990 (gold); WCC 1990 (bronze)
1990–91	Tommy Stjerne	Per Berg	Ivan Frederiksen	Anders Søderblom	Peter Andersen		ECC 1990 (9th)
1991–92	Tommy Stjerne	Per Berg	Peter Andersen	Anders Søderblom	Ivan Frederiksen		DMCC 1992 (gold)
1992–93	Tommy Stjerne	Per Berg	Peter Andersen	Ivan Frederiksen	Anders Søderblom		ECC 1992 (8th)
1993–94	Tommy Stjerne	Per Berg	Peter Andersen	Ivan Frederiksen	Anders Søderblom		ECC 1993 (silver)
1994–95	Tommy Stjerne	Anders Søderblom	Peter Andersen	Ivan Frederiksen			
1995–96	Tommy Stjerne	Per Berg	Peter Andersen	Ivan Frederiksen	Anders Søderblom	Frants Gufler	ECC 1995 (9th)
1996–97	Tommy Stjerne	Gert Larsen	Peter Andersen	Anders Søderblom	Ivan Frederiksen		DMCC 1997 (gold)
1997–98	Tommy Stjerne	Gert Larsen	Peter Andersen	Ivan Frederiksen	Anders Søderblom		DMCC 1998 (gold); WCC 1998 (7th)
1998–99	Tommy Stjerne	Gert Larsen	Peter Andersen	Ivan Frederiksen	Anders Søderblom	Mikael Qvist, Olle Brudsten	ECC 1998 (7th)
2010–11	Tommy Stjerne	Anders Søderblom	Peter Andersen	Ivan Frederiksen	Per Berg		DMCC 2011 (gold)
2010–11	Tommy Stjerne	Per Berg	Peter Andersen	Anders Søderblom	Jan Nebelong	Rasmus Stjerne	WCC 2011 (12th)
2011–12	Tommy Stjerne	Per Berg	Peter Andersen	Anders Søderblom	Jan Nebelong		DMCC 2012 (???th)
2012–13	Tommy Stjerne	Anders Søderblom	Per Berg	Ivan Frederiksen	Peter Andersen		DMCC 2013 (4th)
2013–14	Tommy Stjerne	Per Berg	Peter Andersen	Anders Søderblom	Ivan Frederiksen		DMCC 2014 (6th)
2014–15	Tommy Stjerne	Anders Søderblom	Peter Andersen	Ivan Frederiksen			

=== Mixed ===
Season	Skip	Third	Second	Lead	Events
1982	Tommy Stjerne	Lene Nielsen	Peter Andersen	Lone Kristoffersen	DMxCC 1982 (gold)
