= Gabriella Qvist =

Danish female curler and coach

- Curler
- Born: 26 June 2003 (age 23)

Team
- Curling club: Gentofte CC, Gentofte, Hvidovre CC, Hvidovre
- Skip: Karolina Jensen
- Third: Gabriella Qvist
- Second: Natalie Wiksten
- Lead: Katrine Schmidt
- Alternate: Maja Bidstrup Nyboe

Curling career
- Member Association: Denmark
- World Championship: 1 (2019)
- European Championship: 1 (2019)
- Other appearances: World Mixed Championship: 1 (2017), World Junior Championships: 2 (2020, 2022), World Junior-B Championships: 4 (2016, 2018, 2019 (Jan), 2019 (Dec)), 2022 (Dec))

Gabriella Qvist (born 26 June 2003) is a Danish female curler and coach.

== Teams ==
=== Women's ===
Season	Skip	Third	Second	Lead	Alternate	Coach	Events
2015–16	Mathilde Halse	Elizabeth Søndergaard-Nielsen	Anna Solberg	My Hollinger	Gabriella Qvist	Are Solberg	DJCC 2016 (gold); WJBCC 2016 (12th)
2017–18	Jasmin Lander	Mie Milvang-Jensen	Alberte Madsen	Gabriella Qvist	Katja Milvang-Jensen		DJCC 2018 (gold)
2017–18	Jasmin Lander	Alberte Madsen	Gabriella Qvist	Mie Milvang-Jensen	Katja Milvang-Jensen	Lene Nielsen, Lars Vilandt	WJBCC 2018 (22nd)
2018–19	Mathilde Halse	Jasmin Lander	Gabriella Qvist	My Hollinger	Julie Jørgensen (WJBCC)	Mikael Qvist, Ulrik Schmidt	DJCC 2019 (gold); WJBCC 2019 (Jan) (22nd)
2018–19	Madeleine Dupont	Denise Dupont	Julie Høgh	Lina Knudsen	Gabriella Qvist	Ulrik Schmidt	WCC 2019 (11th)
2019–20	Mathilde Halse	Jasmin Lander	Karolina Jensen	My Larsen	Gabriella Qvist	Mikael Qvist	ECC 2019 (7th); WJBCC 2019 (Dec) (bronze); WJCC 2020 (6th)
2021–22	Karolina Jensen	Gabriella Qvist	Natalie Wiksten	Maja Bidstrup Nyboe	Signe Schack	Angelina Jensen	WJCC 2022 (10th)
2022–23	Karolina Jensen	Gabriella Qvist	Natalie Wiksten	Katrine Schmidt	Maja Bidstrup Nyboe	Søren Tidmand	WJBCC 2022 (Dec) (Dec) (5th)
2023–24	Karolina Jensen	Gabriella Qvist	Natalie Wiksten	Katrine Schmidt	Emilie Holtermann		WJBCC 2023 (Dec) (8th)

=== Mixed ===
Season	Skip	Third	Second	Lead	Events
2015–16	Mikael Qvist	Trine Qvist	Alexander Qvist	Gabriella Qvist	DMxCC 2016 (gold)
2016–17	Mikael Qvist	Trine Qvist	Alexander Qvist	Gabriella Qvist	DMxCC 2017 (gold)
2017–18	Mikael Qvist	Trine Qvist	Alexander Qvist	Gabriella Qvist	WMxCC 2017 (23rd)
2018–19	Karolina Jensen	Kilian Jacobsen	Gabriella Qvist	Sean Søndergaard-Nielsen	EYOWF 2019 (5th)

=== Mixed doubles ===
Season	Female	Male	Coach	Events
2022–23	Gabriella Qvist	Alexander Qvist	Mikeal Qvist, Trine Qvist	DMDCC 2023 (5th)

== Record as a coach of national teams ==
Year	Tournament, event	National team	Place
2019	2019 World Senior Curling Championships	Denmark (women)	2nd place, silver medalist(s)

== Personal life ==
Gabriella Qvist is a member of a family of Danish curlers. Her father is a Swedish-Danish curler and coach Mikael Qvist, her mother is Trine Qvist, her brother is Alexander Qvist. The four of them played as a team, winning the Danish Mixed Curling Championship in 2016 and 2017.
