= Niels Siggaard Andersen =

Danish and Norwegian male curler

- Curler ♂

Team
- Curling club: Gentofte CC, Copenhagen, Hvidovre CC, Hvidovre, Stabekk CC, Oslo

Curling career
- Member Association: Denmark, Norway
- World Championship: 5 (1984, 1991, 2002, 2003, 2005)
- European Championship: 3 (1988, 1989, 2004)
- Other appearances: European Mixed Curling Championship: 1 (2011), World Senior Championship: 4 (2017, 2018, 2019, 2024)
Medal record
Curling
World Championships
Silver medal – second place	2002 Bismarck
Bronze medal – third place	2003 Winnipeg
European Championships
Bronze medal – third place	2004 Sofia
World Senior Championships
Bronze medal – third place	2019 Stavanger
Danish Men's Championship
Gold medal – first place	1984
Gold medal – first place	1991

Niels Siggaard Andersen (also known as Niels Siggaard) is a Danish and later Norwegian curler.

He is a 2002 World Men's silver medallist and a 2003 World Men's bronze medallist.

== Teams ==
=== Men's ===
Season	Skip	Third	Second	Lead	Alternate	Coach	Events
1983–84	Christian Thune	Niels Siggaard	Michael Petersen (DMCC); Jens Møller (WCC)	Torsten Søndergaard			DMCC 1984 (gold); WCC 1984 (9th)
1988–89	Christian Thune	Niels Siggaard	Ole Lehmann de Neergard	Finn Nielsen			ECC 1988 (6th)
1989–90	Frants Gufler	Christian Thune	Niels Siggaard	Finn Nielsen			ECC 1989 (10th)
1990–91	Christian Thune	Niels Siggaard	Henrik Jakobsen	Lasse Lavrsen	Anders Søderblom (WCC)		DMCC 1991 (gold); WCC 1991 (8th)
2001–02	Pål Trulsen	Lars Vågberg	Flemming Davanger	Bent Ånund Ramsfjell	Niels Siggaard Andersen	Ole Ingvaldsen	WCC 2002 (silver)
2002–03	Pål Trulsen	Lars Vågberg	Flemming Davanger	Bent Ånund Ramsfjell	Niels Siggaard Andersen	Ole Ingvaldsen	WCC 2003 (bronze)
2004–05	Pål Trulsen	Lars Vågberg	Flemming Davanger	Bent Ånund Ramsfjell	Niels Siggaard Andersen	Ole Ingvaldsen	ECC 2004 (bronze); WCC 2005 (4th)
2016–17	Ulrik Schmidt	Mikael Qvist	Niels Siggaard Andersen	Christian Thune-Jacobsen		Lisa Richardson	WSCC 2017 (5th)
2017–18	Ulrik Schmidt	Mikael Qvist	Niels Siggaard Andersen	Christian Thune-Jacobsen	Per Svensen	Lisa Richardson	WSCC 2018 (5th)
2018–19	Ulrik Schmidt	Mikael Qvist	Niels Siggaard Andersen	Keld Henriksen	Per Svensen		WSCC 2019 (bronze)

=== Mixed ===
Season	Skip	Third	Second	Lead	Events
1989	Christian Thune	Marie-Louise Siggaard Andersen	Niels Siggaard Andersen	Kinnie Leth Steensen	DMxCC 1989 (gold)
1990	Christian Thune	Marie-Louise Siggaard Andersen	Niels Siggaard Andersen	Majbritt Reinholdt-Gufler	DMxCC 1990 (gold)
1992	Ulrik Schmidt	Dorthe Holm	Niels Siggaard Andersen	Lisa Richardson	DMxCC 1992 (gold)
1994	Ulrik Schmidt	Dorthe Holm	Niels Siggaard Andersen	Lisa Richardson	DMxCC 1994 (gold)
2010	Mikael Qvist	Mona Sylvest Nielsen	Niels Siggard-Andersen	Trine Qvist	DMxCC 2010 (gold)
2011–12	Mikael Qvist	Mona Sylvest Nielsen	Niels Siggard-Andersen	Trine Qvist	EMxCC 2011 (4th)
