= Gitte Larsen =

Danish curler

- Curler ♀
- Born: Hvidovre, Denmark

Team
- Curling club: Hvidovre CC, Hvidovre

Curling career
- Member Association: Denmark
- World Championship: 2 (1990, 1991)
- European Championship: 2 (1989, 1990)
Medal record
Curling
World Championships
Bronze medal – third place	1990 Västerås
Danish Women's Championship
Gold medal – first place	1990
Gold medal – first place	1991

Gitte Munch Larsen is a Danish curler.

She is a 1990 World women's bronze medallist.

== Teams ==
=== Women's ===
Season	Skip	Third	Second	Lead	Alternate	Events
1989–90	Helena Blach	Malene Krause	Hanne Raun	Gitte Larsen		ECC 1989 (4th)
1989–90	Helena Blach	Malene Krause	Lone Kristoffersen	Gitte Larsen		DWCC 1990 (gold); WCC 1990 (bronze)
1990–91	Helena Blach	Malene Krause	Lone Kristoffersen	Gitte Larsen	Lene Bidstrup (WCC)	ECC 1990 (5th); DWCC 1991 (gold); WCC 1991 (6th)

=== Mixed ===
Season	Skip	Third	Second	Lead	Events
2001	Gert Larsen	Nete Larsen	Mikkel Krause	Gitte Larsen	DMxCC 2001 (gold)
