= Lisa Richardson (curler) =

Danish female curler and coach

- Curler ♀
- Born: June 23, 1966 (age 60); Schenectady, New York, United States

Team
- Curling club: Hvidovre CC, Hvidovre

Curling career
- Member Association: Denmark
- World Championship: 7 (1995, 1996, 1997, 1998, 2000, 2001, 2003)
- European Championship: 9 (1994, 1995, 1996, 1997, 1998, 1999, 2000, 2001, 2003)
- Olympic: 1: (2002)
Medal record
Curling
World Championships
Silver medal – second place	1998 Kamloops
Bronze medal – third place	1997 Bern
Bronze medal – third place	2001 Lausanne
European Championships
Gold medal – first place	1994 Sundsvall
Silver medal – second place	1997 Füssen
Silver medal – second place	2001 Vierumäki
Bronze medal – third place	1998 Flims
Bronze medal – third place	2003 Courmayeur
Danish Women's Championship
Gold medal – first place	1995
Gold medal – first place	1996
Gold medal – first place	1997
Gold medal – first place	1998
Gold medal – first place	2000
Gold medal – first place	2001
Gold medal – first place	2003

Lisa Ann Richardson (born June 23, 1966 in Schenectady, New York, United States) is a Danish curler and curling coach.

She is a 1994 European champion and participant of the 2002 Winter Olympics.

Richardson is married to Danish curler and coach Ulrik Schmidt. She was raised in Cambridge, Ontario.

== Teams ==
=== Women's ===
Season	Skip	Third	Second	Lead	Alternate	Coach	Events
1994–95	Helena Blach Lavrsen	Dorthe Holm	Margit Pörtner	Helene Jensen	Lisa Richardson	Jane Bidstrup	ECC 1994 (gold)
1994–95	Helena Blach Lavrsen	Dorthe Holm	Helene Jensen	Margit Pörtner	Lisa Richardson		DWCC 1995 (gold); WCC 1995 (5th)
1995–96	Helena Blach Lavrsen	Dorthe Holm	Helene Jensen	Margit Pörtner	Lisa Richardson		DWCC 1996 (gold)
1995–96	Dorthe Holm	Margit Pörtner	Helene Jensen	Lisa Richardson	Helena Blach Lavrsen	Frants Gufler (ECC)	ECC 1995 (5th); WCC 1996 (7th)
1996–97	Dorthe Holm	Margit Pörtner	Helene Jensen	Lisa Richardson	Helena Blach Lavrsen	Frants Gufler	ECC 1996 (7th)
1996–97	Helena Blach Lavrsen	Dorthe Holm	Margit Pörtner	Lisa Richardson	Trine Qvist		DWCC 1997 (gold)
1996–97	Helena Blach Lavrsen	Margit Pörtner	Dorthe Holm	Lisa Richardson	Jane Bidstrup		WCC 1997 (bronze)
1997–98	Helena Blach Lavrsen	Dorthe Holm	Margit Pörtner	Lisa Richardson	Lene Bidstrup (ECC); Trine Qvist (DWCC)		ECC 1997 (silver); DWCC 1998 (gold)
1997–98	Helena Blach Lavrsen	Margit Pörtner	Dorthe Holm	Lisa Richardson	Trine Qvist		WCC 1998 (silver)
1998	Helena Blach Lavrsen	Dorthe Holm	Trine Qvist	Lisa Richardson	Jeanett Syngre		ECC 1998 (bronze)
1999–00	Lene Bidstrup	Malene Krause	Susanne Slotsager	Avijaja Petri	Lisa Richardson	Olle Brudsten	ECC 1999 (6th); DWCC 2000 (gold); WCC 2000 (6th)
2000–01	Lene Bidstrup	Malene Krause	Susanne Slotsager	Avijaja Lund Nielsen	Lisa Richardson	Olle Brudsten (ECC), Frants Gufler (WCC)	ECC 2000 (6th); DWCC 2001 (gold); WCC 2001 (bronze)
2001–02	Lene Bidstrup	Susanne Slotsager	Malene Krause	Avijaja Lund Nielsen	Lisa Richardson	Hans Gufler (ECC), Olle Brudsten (OG)	ECC 2001 (silver); WOG 2002 (9th)
2003	Dorthe Holm	Lene Bidstrup	Malene Krause	Lisa Richardson			DWCC 2003 (gold)

=== Mixed ===
Season	Skip	Third	Second	Lead	Events
1992	Ulrik Schmidt	Dorthe Holm	Niels Siggaard Andersen	Lisa Richardson	DMxCC 1992 (gold)
1994	Ulrik Schmidt	Dorthe Holm	Niels Siggaard Andersen	Lisa Richardson	DMxCC 1994 (gold)
2005	Ulrik Schmidt	Dorthe Holm	Lasse Lavrsen	Lisa Richardson	DMxCC 2005 (gold)

== Record as a coach of national teams ==
Year	Tournament, event	National team	Place
2017	2017 World Senior Curling Championships	Denmark (senior men)	5
2018	2018 World Senior Curling Championships	Denmark (senior men)	5
