= Lone Kristoffersen =

Danish curler

- Curler ♀
- Born: 20 November 1961 (age 64); Glostrup, Denmark

Team
- Curling club: Hvidovre CC, Hvidovre

Curling career
- Member Association: Denmark
- World Championship: 6 (1985, 1986, 1987, 1988, 1990, 1991)
- European Championship: 3 (1983, 1984, 1990)
- Olympic: 1988 (demo)
- Other appearances: European Junior Championships: 1 (1983)
Medal record
Curling
World Championships
Bronze medal – third place	1990 Västerås
Danish Women's Championship
Gold medal – first place	1985
Gold medal – first place	1986
Gold medal – first place	1987
Gold medal – first place	1988
Gold medal – first place	1990
Gold medal – first place	1991

Lone Kristoffersen (born 20 November 1961) is a Danish curler.

She is a 1990 World women's bronze medallist.

She competed at the 1988 Winter Olympics when curling was a demonstration sport. The Danish women's team finished in sixth place.

== Teams ==
=== Women's ===
Season	Skip	Third	Second	Lead	Alternate	Events
1982–83	Helena Blach	Jette Olsen	Malene Krause	Lone Kristoffersen		DJCC 1983 (gold); EJCC 1983 (gold)
1983–84	Helena Blach	Jette Olsen	Malene Krause	Lone Kristoffersen		ECC 1983 (8th)
1984–85	Helena Blach	Jette Olsen	Malene Krause	Lone Kristoffersen		ECC 1984 (5th); DWCC 1985 (gold); WCC 1985 (6th)
1985–86	Helena Blach	Jette Olsen	Malene Krause	Lone Kristoffersen		DWCC 1986 (gold); WCC 1986 (8th)
1986–87	Jette Olsen (fourth)	Helena Blach (skip)	Malene Krause	Lone Kristoffersen		DWCC 1987 (gold); WCC 1987 (7th)
1987–88	Helena Blach	Malene Krause	Lone Kristoffersen	Lene Nielsen		WOG 1988 (demo) (6th); DWCC 1988 (gold); WCC 1988 (5th)
1989–90	Helena Blach	Malene Krause	Lone Kristoffersen	Gitte Larsen		DWCC 1990 (gold); WCC 1990 (bronze)
1990–91	Helena Blach	Malene Krause	Lone Kristoffersen	Gitte Larsen	Lene Bidstrup (WCC)	ECC 1990 (5th); DWCC 1991 (gold); WCC 1991 (6th)

=== Mixed ===
Season	Skip	Third	Second	Lead	Events
1982	Tommy Stjerne	Lene X. Nielsen	Peter Andersen	Lone Kristoffersen	DMxCC 1982 (gold)
1986	John Kjærulff	Astrid Birnbaum	Steen Hansen	Lone Kristoffersen	DMxCC 1986 (gold)
