= Kenneth Hertsdahl =

Danish male curler and coach

- Curler ♂
- Born: 4 April 1973 (age 53); Rødovre, Denmark

Team
- Curling club: Hvidovre CC, Hvidovre

Curling career
- Member Association: Denmark
- World Championship: 2 (2005, 2007)
- European Championship: 2 (2006, 2007)
- Other appearances: World Junior Championships: 1 (1994)
Medal record
Curling
European Championships
Silver medal – second place	2007 Füssen
Danish Men's Championship
Gold medal – first place	2007
Gold medal – first place	2008
Gold medal – first place	2009
Gold medal – first place	2010
Gold medal – first place	2015
Bronze medal – third place	2014

Kenneth Rifbjerg Hertsdahl (born 4 April 1973) is a Danish curler and curling coach.

At the international level, he is a 2007 European bronze medallist.

At the national level, he is a five-time Danish men's champion curler (2007, 2008, 2009, 2010, 2015) and a 1999 Danish mixed champion curler.

== Personal life ==
Hertsdahl is married and has three children. He currently lives in Hvidovre.

== Teams ==
=== Men's ===
Season	Skip	Third	Second	Lead	Alternate	Coach	Events
1993–94	Johnny Frederiksen	Kenneth Hertsdahl	Lars Vilandt	Bo Jensen	Lars Nissen		WJCC 1994 (8th)
2004–05	Johnny Frederiksen	Lars Vilandt	Kenneth Hertsdahl	Bo Jensen	Ivan Frederiksen	Rene Arnsfelt	WCC 2005 (11th)
2005–06	Johnny Frederiksen	Lars Vilandt	Kenneth Hertsdahl	Bo Jensen			
2006–07	Johnny Frederiksen	Lars Vilandt	Bo Jensen	Kenneth Hertsdahl	Ivan Frederiksen	Rene Arnsfelt (WCC)	ECC 2006 (8th); DMCC 2007 (gold); WCC 2007 (11th)
2007–08	Johnny Frederiksen	Lars Vilandt	Bo Jensen	Kenneth Hertsdahl	Mikkel Adrup Poulsen	Ulrik Schmidt	ECC 2007 (bronze)
2007–08	Johnny Frederiksen	Lars Vilandt	Kenneth Hertsdahl	Bo Jensen	Ulrik Schmidt		DMCC 2008 (gold)
2008–09	Johnny Frederiksen	Lars Vilandt	Kenneth Hertsdahl	Bo Jensen	Ulrik Schmidt		DMCC 2009 (gold)
2009–10	Johnny Frederiksen	Lars Vilandt	Kenneth Hertsdahl	Bo Jensen	Ulrik Schmidt		DMCC 2010 (gold)
2012–13	Bo Jensen	Kenneth Hertsdahl	Poul-Erik Nielsen	Ole de Neergaard			DMCC 2013 (5th)
2013–14	Bo Jensen	Kenneth Hertsdahl	Mikkel Sand	Jorgen Larsen			DMCC 2014 (bronze)
2014–15	Johnny Frederiksen	Bo Jensen	Lars Vilandt	Kenneth Hertsdahl			DMCC 2015 (gold)

=== Mixed ===
Season	Skip	Third	Second	Lead	Events
1998–99	Johnny Frederiksen	Louise Raun Jensen	Kenneth Hertsdahl	Camilla Hansen	DMxCC 1999 (gold)

== Record as a coach of national teams ==
Year	Tournament, event	National team	Place
2014	2014 European Junior Curling Challenge	Denmark (junior men)	4
2015	2015 European Curling Championships	Spain (men)	22
2017	2017 World Junior B Curling Championships	Denmark (junior men)	5
2017	2017 European Curling Championships	Spain (men)	14
2018	2018 European Curling Championships (C Division)	Denmark (men)	1
2018	2018 European Curling Championships	Spain (men)	17
2019	2019 European Curling Championships	Spain (men)	15
