= Jan Hansen (curler) =

Danish male curler

- Curler ♂
- Born: 16 December 1957 (age 68); Hvidovre

Team
- Curling club: Hvidovre CC, Hvidovre

Curling career
- Member Association: Denmark
- World Championship: 3 (1982, 1987, 1988)
- European Championship: 3 (1979, 1980, 1981)
- Olympic: 1 (1988, demonstration)
Medal record
Curling
European Championships
Bronze medal – third place	1981 Grindelwald
Danish Men's Championship
Gold medal – first place	1979
Gold medal – first place	1982
Gold medal – first place	1987
Gold medal – first place	1988

Jan Frank Hansen (born 16 December 1957 in Hvidovre) is a Danish curler.

At the international level, he is a 1981 European bronze medallist.

At the national level, he is a four-time Danish men's champion curler (1979, 1982, 1987, 1988) and two-time Danish mixed champion curler (1980, 1954).

He participated in the curling demonstration event at the 1988 Winter Olympics, where the Danish men's team finished sixth.

== Teams ==
=== Men's ===
Season	Skip	Third	Second	Lead	Coach	Events
1978–79	Per Berg	Gert Larsen	Jan Hansen	Michael Harry		DMCC 1979 (gold)
1979–80	Per Berg	Gert Larsen	Jan Hansen	Michael Harry		ECC 1979 (6th)
1980–81	Per Berg	Gert Larsen	Jan Hansen	Michael Harry		ECC 1980 (6th)
1981–82	Per Berg	Gert Larsen	Jan Hansen	Michael Harry	Antonny Hinge	ECC 1981 (bronze); DMCC 1982 (gold); WCC 1982 (8th)
1986–87	Gert Larsen	Oluf Olsen	Jan Hansen	Michael Harry		DMCC 1987 (gold); WCC 1987 (4th)
1987–88	Gert Larsen	Oluf Olsen	Jan Hansen	Michael Harry		WOG 1988, demo (6th); DMCC 1988 (gold); WCC 1988 (8th)

=== Mixed ===
Season	Skip	Third	Second	Lead	Events
1980	Per Berg	Helena Blach	Jan Hansen	Hanne Rasmussen	DMxCC 1980 (gold)
1984	Per Berg	Helena Blach	Jan Hansen	Malene Krause	DMxCC 1984 (gold)
