= Jan Nebelong =

Danish male curler

- Curler ♂
- Born: 18 January 1955 (age 71)

Team
- Curling club: Hvidovre CC, Hvidovre

Curling career
- Member Association: Denmark
- World Championship: 1 (2011)

Jan Elgaard Nebelong (born 18 January 1955) is a Danish curler.

== Teams ==
Season	Skip	Third	Second	Lead	Alternate	Coach	Events
2010–11	Tommy Stjerne	Per Berg	Peter Andersen	Anders Søderblom	Jan Nebelong	Rasmus Stjerne	WCC 2011 (12th)
2011–12	Tommy Stjerne	Per Berg	Peter Andersen	Anders Søderblom	Jan Nebelong		DMCC 2012 (???th)
