= Per Berg =

Danish male curler

- Curler ♂
- Born: 6 August 1961 (age 65)

Team
- Curling club: Hvidovre CC, Hvidovre

Curling career
- Member Association: Denmark
- World Championship: 5 (1982, 1985, 1989, 1990, 2011)
- European Championship: 9 (1979, 1980, 1981, 1985, 1986, 1990, 1992, 1993, 1995)
Medal record
Curling
World Championships
Bronze medal – third place	1990 Västerås
European Championships
Silver medal – second place	1993 Leukerbad
Bronze medal – third place	1981 Grindelwald
Danish Men's Championship
Gold medal – first place	1979
Gold medal – first place	1982
Gold medal – first place	1986
Gold medal – first place	1989
Gold medal – first place	1990
Gold medal – first place	1992
Gold medal – first place	2011

Per Berg (born 6 August 1961) is a Danish curler.

He is a 1990 World Men's bronze medallist.

== Teams ==
=== Men's ===
Season	Skip	Third	Second	Lead	Alternate	Coach	Events
1978–79	Per Berg	Gert Larsen	Jan Hansen	Michael Harry			DMCC 1979 (gold)
1979–80	Per Berg	Gert Larsen	Jan Hansen	Michael Harry			ECC 1979 (6th)
1980–81	Per Berg	Gert Larsen	Jan Hansen	Michael Harry			ECC 1980 (6th)
1981–82	Per Berg	Gert Larsen	Jan Hansen	Michael Harry		Antonny Hinge	ECC 1981 (bronze); DMCC 1982 (gold); WCC 1982 (8th)
1985–86	Tommy Stjerne	Per Berg	Peter Andersen	Ivan Frederiksen	Michael Harry (WCC)		ECC 1985 (4th); DMCC 1986 (gold); WCC 1986 (8th)
1986–87	Tommy Stjerne	Per Berg	Peter Andersen	Ivan Frederiksen			ECC 1986 (7th)
1988–89	Tommy Stjerne	Per Berg	Peter Andersen	Anders Søderblom	Ivan Frederiksen		DMCC 1989 (gold); WCC 1989 (6th)
1989–90	Tommy Stjerne	Per Berg	Peter Andersen	Ivan Frederiksen	Anders Søderblom		DMCC 1990 (gold); WCC 1990 (bronze)
1990–91	Tommy Stjerne	Per Berg	Ivan Frederiksen	Anders Søderblom	Peter Andersen		ECC 1990 (9th)
1991–92	Tommy Stjerne	Per Berg	Peter Andersen	Anders Søderblom	Ivan Frederiksen		DMCC 1992 (gold)
1992–93	Tommy Stjerne	Per Berg	Peter Andersen	Ivan Frederiksen	Anders Søderblom		ECC 1992 (8th)
1993–94	Tommy Stjerne	Per Berg	Peter Andersen	Ivan Frederiksen	Anders Søderblom		ECC 1993 (silver)
1995–96	Tommy Stjerne	Per Berg	Peter Andersen	Ivan Frederiksen	Anders Søderblom	Frants Gufler	ECC 1995 (9th)
2010–11	Tommy Stjerne	Anders Søderblom	Peter Andersen	Ivan Frederiksen	Per Berg		DMCC 2011 (gold)
2010–11	Tommy Stjerne	Per Berg	Peter Andersen	Anders Søderblom	Jan Nebelong	Rasmus Stjerne	WCC 2011 (12th)
2011–12	Tommy Stjerne	Per Berg	Peter Andersen	Anders Søderblom	Jan Nebelong		DMCC 2012 (???th)
2012–13	Tommy Stjerne	Anders Søderblom	Per Berg	Ivan Frederiksen	Peter Andersen		DMCC 2013 (4th)
2013–14	Tommy Stjerne	Per Berg	Peter Andersen	Anders Søderblom	Ivan Frederiksen		DMCC 2014 (6th)

=== Mixed ===
Season	Skip	Third	Second	Lead	Events
1980	Per Berg	Helena Blach	Jan Hansen	Hanne Rasmussen	DMxCC 1980 (gold)
1984	Per Berg	Helena Blach	Jan Hansen	Malene Krause	DMxCC 1984 (gold)
1985	Per Berg	Helena Blach	Hans Gufler	Malene Krause	DMxCC 1985 (gold)
