= Ulrik Damm =

Danish male curler and coach

- Curler ♂

Team
- Curling club: Hvidovre CC, Hvidovre

Curling career
- Member Association: Denmark
- World Championship: 1 (1997)
- European Championship: 2 (1996, 2018)
- Other appearances: World Qualification Event: 1 (2019), World Junior Championships: 2 (1991, 1992)
Medal record
Curling
Danish Men's Championship
Gold medal – first place	1996

Ulrik Damm is a Danish curler and curling coach.

At the national level, he is a 1996 Danish men's champion curler and two-time Danish mixed champion curler (1991, 2015).

== Teams ==
=== Men's ===
Season	Skip	Third	Second	Lead	Alternate	Coach	Events
1990–91	Torkil Svensgaard	Ulrik Damm	Kenny Tordrup	Lasse Damm	Peter Bull		WJCC 1991 (5th)
1991–92	Torkil Svensgaard	Ulrik Damm	Kenny Tordrup	Peter Bull	Lasse Damm		WJCC 1992 (9th)
1995–96	Ulrik Schmidt	Lasse Lavrsen	Ulrik Damm	Brian Hansen			DMCC 1996 (gold)
1996–97	Ulrik Schmidt	Lasse Lavrsen	Brian Hansen	Ulrik Damm	Carsten Svensgaard (WCC)	Frants Gufler (ECC), Bill Carey (WCC)	ECC 1996 (5th); WCC 1997 (6th)
2011–12	Ulrik Damm	Kjell-Arne Olsson	Mikael Qvist	Martin Poulsen	Brian Hansen		DMCC 2012 (???th)
2013–14	Ulrik Damm	Kjell-Arne Olsson	Søren Jensen	Haldan Skaarberg			DMCC 2013 (8th)
2014–15	Ulrik Damm	Kjell-Arne Olsson	Keld Henriksen	Søren Jensen			
2015–16	Mikkel Krause (fourth)	Martin Grønbech (skip)	Daniel Abrahamsen	Ulrik Damm	Kjell-Arne Olsson		
2016–17	Martin Grønbech	Ulrik Damm	Daniel Abrahamsen	Nicolai Frederiksen			
2017–18	Mikkel Krause	Martin Grønbech	Daniel Abrahamsen	Ulrik Damm			
2017–18	Mikkel Krause	Mads Nørgaard Rasmussen	Daniel Abrahamsen	Ulrik Damm	Daniel Poulsen	Kenneth Hertsdahl	ECC 2018 (C div.) (1st)
2018–19	Ulrik Damm	Kasper Wiksten	Daniel Abrahamsen	Kasper Jørgensen	Daniel Buchholt	Mikael Qvist	WQE 2019 (7th)

=== Mixed ===
Season	Skip	Third	Second	Lead	Events
1990–91	Johannes Jensen	Angelina Jensen	Ulrik Damm	Kirsten Jensen	DMxCC 1991 (gold)
2014–15	Madeleine Dupont	Mikkel Krause	Denise Dupont	Ulrik Damm	DMxCC 2015 (gold)

== Record as a coach of national teams ==
Year	Tournament, event	National team	Place
2015	2015 World Mixed Doubles Curling Championship	Denmark (mixed doubles)	5
