= Christian Thune Jacobsen =

Danish male curler and coach

- Curler ♂

Team
- Curling club: Gentofte CC, Copenhagen, Hvidovre CC, Hvidovre

Curling career
- Member Association: Denmark
- World Championship: 2 (1984, 1991)
- European Championship: 2 (1988, 1989)
- Other appearances: World Senior Championship: 3 (2017, 2018, 2024)
Medal record
Curling
Danish Men's Championship
Gold medal – first place	1984
Gold medal – first place	1991

Christian Thune Jacobsen (also known as Christian Thune-Jacobsen, Christian Thune) is a Danish curler and curling coach.

At the national level he is a two-time Danish men's champion curler (1984, 1991) and a two-time Danish men's champion curler (1989, 1990).

== Teams ==
=== Men's ===
Season	Skip	Third	Second	Lead	Alternate	Coach	Events
1983–84	Christian Thune	Niels Siggaard	Michael Petersen (DMCC); Jens Møller (WCC)	Torsten Søndergaard			DMCC 1984 (gold); WCC 1984 (9th)
1988–89	Christian Thune	Niels Siggaard	Ole Lehmann de Neergard	Finn Nielsen			ECC 1988 (6th)
1989–90	Frants Gufler	Christian Thune	Niels Siggaard	Finn Nielsen			ECC 1989 (10th)
1990–91	Christian Thune	Niels Siggaard	Henrik Jakobsen	Lasse Lavrsen	Anders Søderblom (WCC)		DMCC 1991 (gold); WCC 1991 (8th)
2013–14	Mikael Qvist	Tobias Thune	Kim Sylvest Nielsen	Fabian Thune	Christian Thune		DMCC 2014 (5th)
2016–17	Ulrik Schmidt	Mikael Qvist	Niels Siggaard Andersen	Christian Thune-Jacobsen		Lisa Richardson	WSCC 2017 (5th)
2017–18	Christian Thune (fourth)	Bjorn Tore Elvevold	Erik Hoff (skip)	Geir Morten Fjaeran			
2017–18	Ulrik Schmidt	Mikael Qvist	Niels Siggaard Andersen	Christian Thune-Jacobsen	Per Svensen	Lisa Richardson	WSCC 2018 (5th)

=== Mixed ===
Season	Skip	Third	Second	Lead	Events
1989	Christian Thune	Marie-Louise Siggaard Andersen	Niels Siggaard Andersen	Kinnie Leth Steensen	DMxCC 1989 (gold)
1990	Christian Thune	Marie-Louise Siggaard Andersen	Niels Siggaard Andersen	Majbritt Reinholdt-Gufler	DMxCC 1990 (gold)

== Record as a coach of national teams ==
Year	Tournament, event	National team	Place
2007	2007 European Curling Championships	Poland (women)	15
2015	2015 European Curling Championships	Poland (women)	16
2016	2016 World Mixed Doubles Curling Championship	Denmark (mixed double)	13
2018	2018 European Curling Championships (C Division)	Poland (women)	2 (C div.)
