= Kirsten Jensen (curler) =

Danish curler and coach (born 1952)

- Curler ♀
- Born: 27 December 1952 (age 73)

Team
- Curling club: Tårnby CC, Tårnby

Curling career
- Member Association: Denmark
- World Mixed Doubles Championship: 1 (2008)
- Other appearances: European Mixed Championship: 1 (2012)
Medal record
Curling

Kirsten Jensen (born 27 December 1952) is a Danish curler and curling coach.

At the national level, she is a two-time mixed champion (1991, 2011) and mixed doubles champion (2008).

== Teams ==
=== Women's ===
Season	Skip	Third	Second	Lead	Events
2005–06	Kirsten Jensen	Lone Tordrup	Lone Christiansen	Dorthe Hansen	WSCC 2006 (9th)

=== Mixed ===
Season	Skip	Third	Second	Lead	Events
1990–91	Johannes Jensen	Angelina Jensen	Ulrik Damm	Kirsten Jensen	DMxCC 1991 (gold)
2011–12	Mikael Qvist	Trine Qvist	Are Solberg	Kirsten Jensen	DMxCC 2011 (gold)
2012–13	Mikael Qvist	Trine Qvist	Are Solberg	Kirsten Jensen	EMxCC 2012 (15th)

=== Mixed doubles ===
Season	Male	Female	Events
2007–08	Lasse Damm	Kirsten Jensen	DMDCC 2008 (gold); WMDCC 2008 (21st)

== Record as a coach of national teams ==
Year	Tournament, event	National team	Place
2008	2008 World Senior Curling Championships	Denmark (senior men)	18
2010	2010 European Junior Curling Challenge	Denmark (junior women)	2nd place, silver medalist(s)
2011	2011 European Junior Curling Challenge	Denmark (junior women)	4

== Personal life ==
Kirsten is from famous family of Danish curlers. Her husband is Johannes Jensen - curler, coach and longtime (since 1987) president of Tårnby Curling Club; at 2021 he was inducted into the WCF Hall of Fame as "builder". Their daughters Angelina Jensen and Camilla Jensen are famous Danish curlers, national champions, World and European medallists. Kirsten, Johannes and Angelina as mixed team won 1991 Danish mixed championship.
