= 2024 World Senior Curling Championships =

- Host city: Östersund, Sweden
- Arena: Östersund Arena
- Dates: April 20–27
- Men's winner: Canada
- Curling club: Halifax CC, Halifax
- Skip: Paul Flemming
- Third: Peter Burgess
- Second: Martin Gavin
- Lead: Kris Granchelli
- Alternate: Kevin Ouellette
- Finalist: United States (Farbelow)
- Women's winner: Canada
- Curling club: Alliston CC, Alliston
- Skip: Susan Froud
- Third: Kerry Lackie
- Second: Kristin Turcotte
- Lead: Julie McMullin
- Alternate: Jo-Ann Rizzo
- Coach: Alain Corbeil
- Finalist: Lithuania (Paulauskaitė)

The 2024 World Senior Curling Championships were held from April 20 to 27 at the Östersund Arena in Östersund, Sweden. The event was held in conjunction with the 2024 World Mixed Doubles Curling Championship.

== Men ==
=== Teams ===
The teams are listed as follows:

Australia	Belgium	Canada	Croatia	Czech Republic
Skip: Geoff Davis; Third: David Imlah; Second: James Boyd; Lead: Hamish Lorrain-Smith	Skip: Stefan van Dijck; Third: Walter Verbueken; Second: Bart Palmans; Lead: Jan de Swert; Alternate: Jan Michiels	Skip: Paul Flemming; Third: Peter Burgess; Second: Martin Gavin; Lead: Kris Granchelli; Alternate: Kevin Ouellette	Skip: Alberto Skendrović; Third: Bojan Gabric; Second: Davor Džepina; Lead: Saša Vidmar; Alternate: Zvonimir Lovrić	Skip: David Šik; Third: Karel Hradec; Second: Marek Brožek; Lead: Jiří Chobot; Alternate: David Havlena
Denmark	England	Estonia	Finland	Germany
Skip: Mikael Qvist; Third: Niels Siggaard Andersen; Second: Christian Thune; Lead: Henrik Lander	Skip: Guy Topping; Third: Peter Topping; Second: Peter Alexander; Lead: Chris Kerr; Alternate: John Brown	Skip: Margus Tubalkain; Third: Valvo Vooremä; Second: Tiit Kaart; Lead: Tonis Turmann; Alternate: Igor Dzendzeljuk	Fourth: Tomi Kirjonen; Third: Heikki Rauvola; Second: Ilkka Eivola; Skip: Mika Kalpamä	Skip: Andy Kapp; Third: Oliver Axnick; Second: Holger Höhne; Lead: Andreas Kempf; Alternate: Markus Messenzehl
Hong Kong	Hungary	Ireland	Japan	Latvia
Skip: Chun Ngok Wong; Third: Shek Chong Li; Second: Lai Chor Luk; Lead: Hon Keung Chung	Fourth: Peter Sardi; Skip: Peter Besnicz; Second: Bela Jozsef Csillag; Lead: Oliver Kerekes	Skip: Bill Gray; Third: David Whyte; Second: Neil Fyfe; Lead: Ross Barr	Skip: Tamotsu Matsumura; Third: Seiji Yamamoto; Second: Akira Otsuka; Lead: Takahito Tomiyasu	Skip: Ansis Regža; Third: Jānis Rēdlihs; Second: Aivars Purmalis; Lead: Aivars Lācis
New Zealand	Nigeria	Norway	Philippines	Poland
Skip: Peter Becker; Third: Richard Morgan; Second: Nelson Ede; Lead: Murray Pitts; Alternate: David Greer	Skip: T. J. Cole; Third: Chad Johnson; Second: Charles Neimeth; Lead: Damola Daniel	Skip: Flemming Davanger; Third: Bent Ånund Ramsfjell; Second: Johan Høstmælingen; Lead: Lars Vågberg; Alternate: Espen de Lange	Skip: Jonathan Ochoco; Third: Peter Garbes; Second: Alastair Onglingswan; Lead: Joselito Cruz	Fourth: Rymwid Błaszczak; Skip: Arkadiusz Detyniecki; Second: Leszek Molski; Lead: Andrzej Smak; Alternate: Piotr Idzikowski
Scotland	Sweden	Switzerland	United States	Wales
Skip: Hammy McMillan; Third: Murray McWilliam; Second: John Agnew; Lead: Gerald Baillie; Alternate: Alistair Henry	Skip: Mats Wranå; Third: Mikael Hasselborg; Second: Anders Eriksson; Lead: Gerry Wåhlin; Alternate: Per Noréen	Skip: Christof Schwaller; Third: Dominic Andres; Second: Robert Hürlimann; Lead: Christoph Kaiser	Skip: Mike Farbelow; Third: Rich Ruohonen; Second: Bill Stopera; Lead: Darren Lehto	Skip: Andrew Tanner; Third: Richard Pougher; Second: Alistair Reid; Lead: George Fyffe

=== Round robin standings ===
Final Round Robin Standings

Key
Teams to Playoffs

Group A	Skip	W	L	W–L	DSC
Canada	Paul Flemming	6	0	–	52.59
Norway	Flemming Davanger	5	1	–	29.74
Finland	Mika Kalpamä	3	3	1–0	60.74
Denmark	Mikael Qvist	3	3	0–1	68.52
Wales	Andrew Tanner	2	4	1–0	119.23
Croatia	Alberto Skendrović	2	4	0–1	125.58
Philippines	Jonathan Ochoco	0	6	–	78.18

Group B	Skip	W	L	W–L	DSC
Germany	Andy Kapp	5	0	–	40.50
Scotland	Hammy McMillan	3	2	–	54.04
Poland	Arkadiusz Detyniecki	2	3	1–1	65.63
Ireland	Bill Gray	2	3	1–1	83.13
New Zealand	Peter Becker	2	3	1–1	136.16
Nigeria	T. J. Cole	1	4	–	137.66

Group C	Skip	W	L	W–L	DSC
Switzerland	Christof Schwaller	5	0	–	48.64
United States	Mike Farbelow	4	1	–	46.27
Belgium	Stefan van Dijck	3	2	–	86.12
Latvia	Ansis Regža	2	3	–	100.86
Estonia	Margus Tubalkain	1	4	–	108.51
England	Guy Topping	0	5	–	89.49

Group D	Skip	W	L	W–L	DSC
Sweden	Mats Wranå	5	0	–	35.11
Czech Republic	David Šik	4	1	–	55.00
Hungary	Peter Besnicz	3	2	–	92.58
Japan	Tamotsu Matsumura	2	3	–	104.16
Australia	Geoff Davis	1	4	–	86.27
Hong Kong	Chun Ngok Wong	0	5	–	126.60

Group A Round Robin Summary Table
Pos.	Country	Canada	Croatia	Denmark	Finland	Norway	Philippines	Wales	Record
1	Canada	—	14–0	11–3	11–3	5–4	8–3	11–4	6–0
6	Croatia	0–14	—	2–13	9–8	2–10	11–6	3–7	2–4
4	Denmark	3–11	13–2	—	3–6	4–7	7–4	10–3	3–2
3	Finland	3–11	8–9	6–3	—	4–10	11–6	8–6	3–3
2	Norway	4–5	10–2	7–4	10–4	—	16–6	7–2	5–1
7	Philippines	3–8	6–11	4–7	6–11	6–16	—	1–9	0–6
5	Wales	4–11	7–3	3–10	6–8	2–7	9–1	—	2–4

Group B Round Robin Summary Table
Pos.	Country	Germany		Nigeria	New Zealand	Poland	Scotland	Record
1	Germany	—	9–3	20–1	7–5	7–6	8–4	5–0
4	Ireland	3–9	—	15–8	3–9	8–3	3–7	2–3
6	Nigeria	1–20	8–15	—	7–4	1–13	4–11	1–4
5	New Zealand	5–7	9–3	4–7	—	3–8	5–3	2–3
3	Poland	6–7	3–8	13–1	8–3	—	5–8	2–3
2	Scotland	4–8	7–3	11–4	3–5	8–5	—	3–2

Group C Round Robin Summary Table
Pos.	Country	Belgium	England	Estonia	Latvia	Switzerland	United States	Record
3	Belgium	—	10–4	6–4	7–4	2–15	3–8	3–2
6	England	4–10	—	2–8	6–7	1–17	5–10	0–5
5	Estonia	4–6	8–2	—	4–9	3–5	1–8	1–4
4	Latvia	4–7	7–6	9–4	—	4–9	4–6	2–3
1	Switzerland	15–2	17–1	5–3	9–4	—	6–4	5–0
2	United States	8–3	10–5	8–1	6–4	4–6	—	4–1

Group D Round Robin Summary Table
Pos.	Country	Australia	Czech Republic	Hong Kong	Hungary	Japan	Sweden	Record
5	Australia	—	7–8	7–3	6–8	4–11	2–11	1–4
2	Czech Republic	8–7	—	10–5	8–3	5–3	3–5	4–1
6	Hong Kong	3–7	5–10	—	5–6	3–12	2–7	0–5
3	Hungary	8–6	3–8	6–5	—	10–8	3–10	3–2
4	Japan	11–4	3–5	12–3	8–10	—	5–6	2–3
1	Sweden	11–2	5–3	7–2	10–3	6–5	—	5–0

=== Playoffs ===
Quarterfinals
1	Sweden	8
8	Czech Republic	4
4	Canada	7
5	Norway	2
3	Switzerland	7
6	United States	8
2	Germany	9
7	Scotland	4

Semifinals
1	Sweden	6
4	Canada	9
6	United States	10
2	Germany	4

Gold medal game
4	Canada	4
6	United States	3
Bronze medal game
1	Sweden	11
2	Germany	9

==== Quarterfinals ====
Friday, April 26, 13:00

Sheet G	1	2	3	4	5	6	7	8	Final
Canada (Flemming) 🔨	1	0	1	0	0	2	3	X	7
Norway (Davanger)	0	1	0	1	0	0	0	X	2

Sheet H	1	2	3	4	5	6	7	8	Final
Sweden (Wranå)	3	1	0	1	0	3	0	X	8
Czech Republic (Šik) 🔨	0	0	2	0	1	0	1	X	4

Sheet J	1	2	3	4	5	6	7	8	Final
Germany (Kapp)	0	2	0	2	0	5	X	X	9
Scotland (McMillan) 🔨	0	0	2	0	2	0	X	X	4

Sheet K	1	2	3	4	5	6	7	8	Final
Switzerland (Schwaller)	0	3	0	2	0	0	2	0	7
United States (Farbelow) 🔨	3	0	2	0	1	1	0	1	8

==== Semifinals ====
Friday, April 26, 19:00

Sheet G	1	2	3	4	5	6	7	8	Final
United States (Farbelow) 🔨	2	1	2	0	3	0	2	X	10
Germany (Kapp)	0	0	0	2	0	2	0	X	4

Sheet K	1	2	3	4	5	6	7	8	9	Final
Sweden (Wranå) 🔨	1	0	2	0	1	0	0	2	0	6
Canada (Flemming)	0	2	0	1	0	2	1	0	3	9

==== Bronze medal game ====
Saturday, April 27, 10:30

Sheet H	1	2	3	4	5	6	7	8	Final
Sweden (Wranå)	0	5	0	2	0	1	0	3	11
Germany (Kapp) 🔨	4	0	2	0	2	0	1	0	9

==== Final ====
Saturday, April 27, 10:30

Sheet J	1	2	3	4	5	6	7	8	Final
Canada (Flemming) 🔨	1	0	0	2	0	0	0	1	4
United States (Farbelow)	0	1	0	0	2	0	0	0	3

=== Final standings ===
Place	Team
1st place, gold medalist(s)	Canada
2nd place, silver medalist(s)	United States
3rd place, bronze medalist(s)	Sweden
4	Germany
5	Switzerland
5	Norway
5	Scotland
5	Czech Republic
9	Finland
10	Poland
11	Belgium
12	Hungary
13	Denmark
14	Ireland
15	Latvia
16	Japan
17	Australia
18	Estonia
19	Wales
20	New Zealand
21	England
22	Croatia
23	Hong Kong
24	Nigeria
25	Philippines

== Women ==
=== Teams ===
The teams are listed as follows:

Australia	Canada	Czech Republic
Skip: Kim Forge; Third: Lynette Gill; Second: Kim Irvine; Lead: Adrienne Kennedy	Skip: Susan Froud; Third: Kerry Lackie; Second: Kristin Turcotte; Lead: Julie McMullin; Alternate: Jo-Ann Rizzo	Skip: Jana Beránková; Third: Tereza Lošťáková; Second: Vlasta Šikýřová; Lead: Irena Polívková
Denmark	England	Estonia
Fourth: Trine Qvist; Third: Anni Gustavussen; Second: Gitte Sølvsten; Skip: Linette Henningsen; Alternate: Lene Solberg	Skip: Manon Harsch; Third: Angela Wilcox; Second: Helen Forbes; Lead: Deborah Higgins	Skip: Margit Peebo; Third: Kuellike Ustav; Second: Kai Tomingas; Lead: Piret Grossthal; Alternate: Katrin Käre
Finland	Hong Kong	Ireland
Skip: Tiina Julkunen; Third: Laura Kitti; Second: Kirsi Pärma; Lead: Nina Pollanen; Alternate: Riikka Louhivuori	Skip: Ling-Yue Hung; Third: Grace Bugg; Second: May Yam; Lead: Arena McCullough	Skip: Dale Sinclair; Third: Bernie Gillett; Second: Nina Clancy; Lead: Louise Kerr
Japan	Latvia	Lithuania
Skip: Miyako Yoshimura; Third: Misako Den; Second: Hiromi Takizawa; Lead: Makiko Uehara; Alternate: Tamami Horiuchi	Skip: Elena Kapostina; Third: Dace Zile; Second: Gunta Millere; Lead: Aija Rudzite	Skip: Virginija Paulauskaitė; Third: Rasa Jasaitiene; Second: Jolanta Sulinskiene; Lead: Gaiva Valatkiene; Alternate: Egle Cepulyte
New Zealand	Norway	Scotland
Skip: Joanna Olszewski; Third: Elizabeth Matthews; Second: Sandra Thomas; Lead: Merran Anderson; Alternate: Pauline Farra	Fourth: Beate Ruden; Skip: Ellen Storvik; Second: Randi Tørrisen; Lead: Grethe Brenna	Skip: Karen Kennedy; Third: Gail Thomson; Second: Alison Cunningham; Lead: Gillian King; Alternate: Margaret Richardson
Sweden	Switzerland	United States
Skip: Anette Norberg; Third: Cathrine Lindahl; Second: Susanne Patz; Lead: Anna Klange-Wikström; Alternate: Helene Lyxell	Skip: Daniela Ruetschi-Schlegel; Third: Caroline Dryburgh; Second: Corinne Anneler; Lead: Janine Bianchetti; Alternate: Laurence Bidaud	Skip: Angela Montgomery; Third: Susan Dukes; Second: Stephanie Erstad; Lead: Anne Gravel; Alternate: Kathy Pielage

=== Round robin standings ===
Final Round Robin Standings

Key
Teams to Playoffs

Group A	Skip	W	L	W–L	DSC
Canada	Susan Froud	5	0	–	74.02
Lithuania	Virginija Paulauskaitė	4	1	–	80.46
Japan	Miyako Yoshimura	2	3	1–0	62.42
Czech Republic	Jana Berankova	2	3	0–1	108.29
Norway	Ellen Storvik	1	4	1–0	71.12
Finland	Tiina Julkunen	1	4	0–1	132.18

Group B	Skip	W	L	W–L	DSC
Sweden	Anette Norberg	5	0	–	61.34
Latvia	Elena Kapostina	3	2	1–0	82.51
Switzerland	Daniela Ruetschi-Schlegel	3	2	0–1	78.83
Hong Kong	Ling-Yue Hung	2	3	1–0	96.12
Ireland	Dale Sinclair	2	3	0–1	106.34
Estonia	Margit Peebo	0	5	–	85.79

Group C	Skip	W	L	W–L	DSC
Scotland	Karen Kennedy	5	0	–	61.56
England	Manon Harsch	4	1	–	72.78
United States	Angela Montgomery	3	2	–	82.57
New Zealand	Joanna Olszewski	1	4	1–1	111.56
Australia	Kim Forge	1	4	1–1	124.17
Denmark	Linette Henningsen	1	4	1–1	164.51

Group A Round Robin Summary Table
Pos.	Country	Canada	Czech Republic	Finland	Japan	Lithuania	Norway	Record
1	Canada	—	9–3	8–6	9–3	6–3	12–2	5–0
4	Czech Republic	3–9	—	7–6	6–8	3–7	11–9	2–3
6	Finland	6–8	6–7	—	11–3	2–9	2–11	1–4
3	Japan	3–9	8–6	3–11	—	3–5	11–3	2–3
2	Lithuania	3–6	7–3	9–2	5–3	—	9–3	4–1
5	Norway	2–12	9–11	11–2	3–11	3–9	—	1–4

Group B Round Robin Summary Table
Pos.	Country	Estonia	Hong Kong		Latvia	Sweden	Switzerland	Record
6	Estonia	—	1–14	3–9	2–8	1–8	7–11	0–5
4	Hong Kong	14–1	—	8–3	3–7	6–7	3–7	2–3
5	Ireland	9–3	3–8	—	6–5	4–8	6–8	2–3
2	Latvia	8–2	7–3	5–6	—	4–7	6–4	3–2
1	Sweden	8–1	7–6	8–4	7–4	—	8–1	5–0
3	Switzerland	11–7	7–3	8–6	4–6	1–8	—	3–2

Group C Round Robin Summary Table
Pos.	Country	Australia	Denmark	England	New Zealand	Scotland	United States	Record
5	Australia	—	7–2	4–8	4–8	3–10	2–10	1–4
6	Denmark	2–7	—	2–11	10–7	4–14	2–9	1–4
2	England	8–4	11–2	—	7–3	6–9	6–5	4–1
4	New Zealand	8–4	7–10	3–7	—	1–9	3–13	1–4
1	Scotland	10–3	14–4	9–6	9–1	—	6–3	5–0
3	United States	10–2	9–2	5–6	13–3	3–6	—	3–2

=== Playoffs ===
Quarterfinals
1	Sweden	7
8	Switzerland	8
4	England	1
5	Lithuania	11
3	Canada	12
6	Latvia	0
2	Scotland	5
7	Japan	4

Semifinals
8	Switzerland	2
5	Lithuania	5
3	Canada	10
2	Scotland	3

Gold medal game
5	Lithuania	3
3	Canada	7
Bronze medal game
8	Switzerland	3
2	Scotland	6

==== Quarterfinals ====
Thursday, April 25, 19:00

Sheet G	1	2	3	4	5	6	7	8	Final
England (Harsch) 🔨	1	0	0	0	0	0	X	X	1
Lithuania (Paulauskaitė)	0	5	1	1	2	2	X	X	11

Sheet H	1	2	3	4	5	6	7	8	Final
Sweden (Norberg) 🔨	0	2	0	2	0	2	0	1	7
Switzerland (Ruetschi-Schlegel)	1	0	2	0	3	0	2	0	8

Sheet J	1	2	3	4	5	6	7	8	Final
Scotland (Kennedy) 🔨	1	0	0	1	0	0	2	1	5
Japan (Yoshimura)	0	3	0	0	1	0	0	0	4

Sheet K	1	2	3	4	5	6	7	8	Final
Canada (Froud) 🔨	2	1	2	2	4	1	X	X	12
Latvia (Kapostina)	0	0	0	0	0	0	X	X	0

==== Semifinals ====
Friday, April 26, 19:00

Sheet H	1	2	3	4	5	6	7	8	Final
Canada (Froud) 🔨	0	4	0	2	1	0	3	X	10
Scotland (Kennedy)	0	0	2	0	0	1	0	X	3

Sheet J	1	2	3	4	5	6	7	8	Final
Switzerland (Ruetschi-Schlegel)	0	1	0	0	0	0	1	0	2
Lithuania (Paulauskaitė) 🔨	2	0	0	0	2	0	0	1	5

==== Bronze medal game ====
Saturday, April 27, 10:30

Sheet G	1	2	3	4	5	6	7	8	Final
Switzerland (Ruetschi-Schlegel)	1	0	1	0	0	0	1	X	3
Scotland (Kennedy) 🔨	0	3	0	1	1	1	0	X	6

==== Final ====
Saturday, April 27, 10:30

Sheet K	1	2	3	4	5	6	7	8	Final
Lithuania (Paulauskaitė) 🔨	1	0	0	0	0	2	0	X	3
Canada (Froud)	0	2	2	0	2	0	1	X	7

=== Final standings ===
Place	Team
1st place, gold medalist(s)	Canada
2nd place, silver medalist(s)	Lithuania
3rd place, bronze medalist(s)	Scotland
4	Switzerland
5	Sweden
5	England
5	Latvia
5	Japan
9	United States
10	Hong Kong
11	Czech Republic
12	New Zealand
13	Norway
14	Ireland
15	Australia
16	Estonia
17	Finland
18	Denmark
