= Danish Mixed Doubles Curling Championship =

National championship of mixed doubles curling

The Danish Mixed Doubles Curling Championship (German: ÖSTM Mixed Doubles) is the national championship of mixed doubles curling (one man and one woman) in Denmark. It has been held annually since the 2007–2008 season. The championships are organized by the Danish Curling Association (Danish: Dansk Curling Forbund).

== List of champions and medallists ==
Team line-ups in order: female, male.

Year	Champion	Runner-up	Bronze	Finish at Worlds
2008	Kirsten Jensen / Lasse Damm			21
2009	Christine Svensen / Per Svensen			12
2010	Christine Svensen / Martin Uhd Grønbech			12
2011	Lillian Nielsen / Are Solberg			5
2012	Mette de Neergaard / Oliver Dupont			9
2013	Lillian Nielsen / Are Solberg			16
2014	Louise Ravn Levin / Flemming Christensen			27
2015	Denise Dupont / Oliver Dupont			5
2016	Trine Qvist / Mikael Qvist			13
2017	Trine Qvist / Mikael Qvist	Natalie Wiksten / Kasper Wiksten	Christine Grønbech / Martin Uhd Grønbech	30
2018	Christine Grønbech / Martin Uhd Grønbech	Caroline Jalo / Oliver Søe	Jasmin Lander / Henrik Holtermann	20
2019	Christine Grønbech / Martin Uhd Grønbech	Jasmin Lander / Henrik Holtermann		22
2020	Natalie Wiksten / Kasper Wiksten	Christine Grønbech / Martin Uhd Grønbech	Mona Jensen / Morten Berger	not held
2021	not held because COVID-19			−
2022	Sarah Clifford / Oliver Søe	Jasmin Lander / Henrik Holtermann	Signe Schack / Tobias Thune	12
2023	Jasmin Lander / Henrik Holtermann	Sarah Clifford / Oliver Rosenkrands Søe	Katrine Schmidt / Jacob Schmidt	9
2024	Jasmin Lander / Henrik Holtermann	Natalie Wiksten / Kasper Wiksten	Emilie Holtermann / Nikki Jensen	14
2025	Jasmin Holtermann / Henrik Holtermann	Natalie Wiksten / Kasper Wiksten	Katrine Schmidt / Jacob Schmidt	15
2026	Natalie Wiksten / Kasper Wiksten	Jasmin Holtermann / Henrik Holtermann	Caroline Rasmussen / Liam Goldbeck	

== See also ==
- Danish Men's Curling Championship
- Danish Women's Curling Championship
- Danish Mixed Curling Championship
- Danish Junior Curling Championships
