= Mari Hansen =

Finnish curler (born 1966)

Personal information
- Nationality: Finnish
- Born: 6 July 1966 (age 58)

Sport
- Sport: Curling

Achievements and titles
- World finals: 3 (2017, 2018, 2019)

Mari Hansen (born 6 July 1966) is a Finnish curler. She competed at the World Senior Curling Championships in 2017, 2018, and 2019.
