= Mikael Qvist =

Swedish and Danish male curler and curling coach

- Curler ♂

Team
- Curling club: Hvidovre CC, Hvidovre, Gentofte CC, Copenhagen
- Mixed doubles partner: Trine Qvist

Curling career
- Member Association: Sweden, Denmark
- World Mixed Doubles Championship: 1 (2016)
- Other appearances: World Mixed Championship: 2 (2015, 2017), European Mixed Curling Championship: 2 (2011, 2012), World Senior Championship: 4 (2017, 2018, 2019, 2024)
Medal record
Curling
World Senior Championships
Bronze medal – third place	2019 Stavanger

Mikael Qvist (born 12 March 1965) is a Swedish–Danish curler and coach.

At the international level, he is a 2019 World Senior bronze medallist.

At the national level, he is a seven-time Danish mixed champion curler (1998, 2010, 2011, 2012, 2014, 2016, 2017) and two-time Danish mixed doubles champion curler (2016, 2017).

== Personal life ==
Qvist is a member of a family of Danish curlers. His wife is Trine is a former Olympic curler and coach. The two played many times on mixed teams or in mixed doubles. Their children daughter Gabriella and son Alexander are also curlers. The four of them played as a team, winning the Danish Mixed Curling Championship in 2016 and 2017.

== Teams ==
=== Men's ===
Season	Skip	Third	Second	Lead	Alternate	Coach	Events
2011–12	Ulrik Damm	Kjell-Arne Olsson	Mikael Qvist	Martin Poulsen	Brian Hansen		DMCC 2012 (???th)
2013–14	Mikael Qvist	Tobias Thune	Kim Sylvest Nielsen	Fabian Thune	Christian Thune		DMCC 2014 (5th)
2016–17	Ulrik Schmidt	Mikael Qvist	Niels Siggaard Andersen	Christian Thune-Jacobsen		Lisa Richardson	WSCC 2017 (5th)
2017–18	Ulrik Schmidt	Mikael Qvist	Niels Siggaard Andersen	Christian Thune-Jacobsen	Per Svensen	Lisa Richardson	WSCC 2018 (5th)
2018–19	Ulrik Schmidt	Mikael Qvist	Niels Siggaard Andersen	Keld Henriksen	Per Svensen		WSCC 2019 (bronze)

=== Mixed ===
Season	Skip	Third	Second	Lead	Events
1997–98	Mikael Qvist	Trine Qvist	?	?	DMxCC 1998 (gold)
2009–10	Mikael Qvist	Mona Sylvest Nielsen	Niels Siggaard Andersen	Trine Qvist	DMxCC 2010 (gold)
2010–11	Mikael Qvist	Mona Sylvest Nielsen	Niels Siggaard Andersen	Trine Qvist	DMxCC 2011 (gold)
2011–12	Mikael Qvist	Mona Sylvest Nielsen	Niels Siggaard Andersen	Trine Qvist	EMxCC 2011 (4th)
2011–12	Mikael Qvist	Trine Qvist	Are Solberg	Kirsten Jensen	DMxCC 2012 (gold)
2012–13	Mikael Qvist	Trine Qvist	Are Solberg	Kirsten Jensen	EMxCC 2012 (15th)
2013–14	Mikael Qvist	Trine Qvist	Are Solberg	Mathilde Halse	DMxCC 2014 (gold)
2015–16	Mikael Qvist	Trine Qvist	Are Solberg	Mathilde Halse	WMxCC 2015 (9th)
2015–16	Mikael Qvist	Trine Qvist	Alexander Qvist	Gabriella Qvist	DMxCC 2016 (gold)
2016–17	Mikael Qvist	Trine Qvist	Alexander Qvist	Gabriella Qvist	DMxCC 2017 (gold)
2017–18	Mikael Qvist	Trine Qvist	Alexander Qvist	Gabriella Qvist	WMxCC 2017 (23rd)

=== Mixed doubles ===
Season	Woman	Man	Coach	Events
2015–16	Trine Qvist	Mikael Qvist	Christian Thune-Jacobsen	DMDCC 2016 (gold); WMDCC 2016 (13th)
2016–17	Trine Qvist	Mikael Qvist		DMDCC 2017 (gold)

== Record as a coach of national teams ==
Year	Tournament, event	National team	Place
1997	1997 European Curling Championships	Denmark (women)	2nd place, silver medalist(s)
1998	1998 Winter Olympics	Denmark (women)	2nd place, silver medalist(s)
1998	1998 World Women's Curling Championship	Denmark (women)	2nd place, silver medalist(s)
1998	1998 European Curling Championships	Denmark (women)	7
2002	2002 European Curling Championships	Denmark (women)	2nd place, silver medalist(s)
2015	2015 European Curling Championships	Denmark (men)	11
2016	2016 World Men's Curling Championship	Denmark (men)	2nd place, silver medalist(s)
2016	2016 European Curling Championships	Denmark (men)	10
2018	2018 Winter Olympics	Denmark (men)	10
2018	2018 European Curling Championships	Denmark (men)	11
2019	2019 European Curling Championships	Denmark (women)	7
2020	2020 World Junior Curling Championships	Denmark (junior women)	6
2022	2022 World Men's Curling Championship	Denmark (men)	13
