= Karolina Jensen =

Danish female curler (born 2003)

- Curler
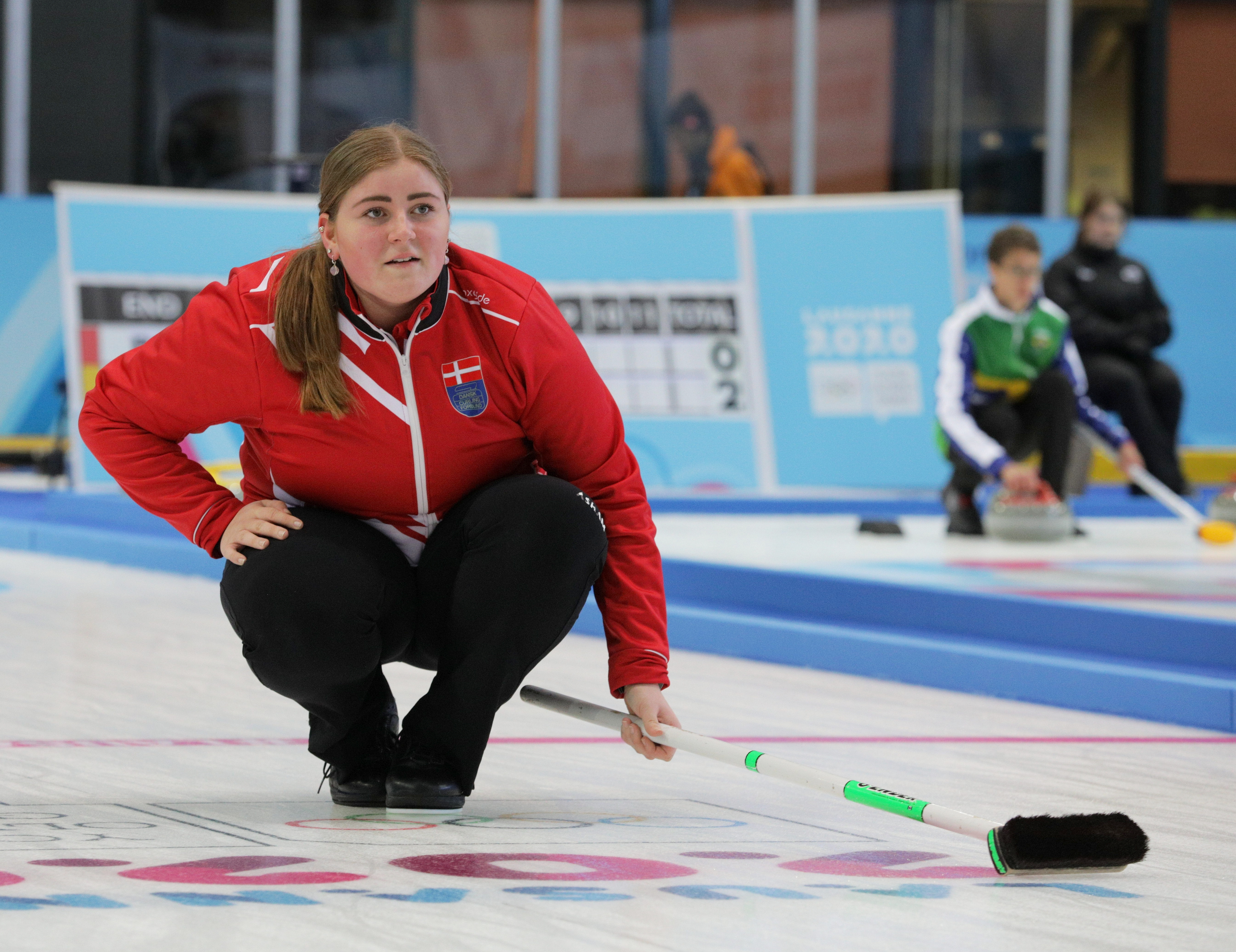
- Born: 8 May 2003 (age 23); Copenhagen

Team
- Curling club: Tårnby CC, Tårnby
- Mixed doubles partner: Alexander Qvist

Curling career
- Member Association: Denmark
- World Mixed Doubles Championship: 1 (2026)
- World Mixed Championship: 1 (2024)
- European Championship: 1 (2019)
- Other appearances: World Junior Championships: 2 (2020, 2022), World Junior-B Championships: 3 (2019 (Dec)), (2022 (Dec)),(2023 (Dec), Winter Youth Olympics: 1 (2020 - mixed, mixed doubles)

Karolina Jensen (born 8 May 2003) is a Danish female curler from Kastrup.

== Personal life ==
As of 2020, Jensen is a student. Her mother is fellow curler Angelina Jensen and her aunt is Camilla Jensen.

== Teams ==
=== Women's ===
Season	Skip	Third	Second	Lead	Alternate	Coach	Events
2019–20	Mathilde Halse	Jasmin Lander	Karolina Jensen	My Larsen	Gabriella Qvist	Mikael Qvist	ECC 2019 (7th); WJBCC 2019 (Dec) (bronze); WJCC 2020 (6th)
2021–22	Karolina Jensen	Gabriella Qvist	Natalie Wiksten	Maja Bidstrup Nyboe	Signe Schack	Angelina Jensen	WJCC 2022 (10th)
2022-23	Karolina Jensen	Gabriella Qvist	Natalie Wiksten	Katrine Schmidt	Maja Bidstrup Nyboe		WJBCC 2022 (5th)
2023-24	Karolina Jensen	Gabriella Qvist	Natalie Wiksten	Katrine Schmidt	Emilie Holtermann		WJBCC 2023 (5th)

=== Mixed ===
Season	Skip	Third	Second	Lead	Alternate	Coach	Events
2018–19	Karolina Jensen	Kilian Jacobsen	Gabriella Qvist	Sean Søndergaard-Nielsen		Angelina Jensen	EYOWF 2019 (5th)
2019–20	Jonathan Vilandt	Karolina Jensen	Kilian Thune	Natalie Wiksten		Lars Vilandt	WYOG 2020 (13th)
2024–25	Karolina Jensen	Liam Goldbeck	Signe Schack	Christian Karger		Dillan Perras	WMxCC 2024

=== Mixed doubles ===
Season	Female	Male	Coach	Events
2019–20	Karolina Jensen	Zhai Zhixin	Lars Vilandt	WYOG 2020 (13th)
2025–26	Karolina Jensen	Alexander Qvist	Angelina Jensen	WMDCC 2026 (19th)
