= Mikkel Poulsen =

Danish curler (born 1984)

Mikkel Adrup Poulsen
- Curler
- Born: 17 October 1984 (age 42); Hvidovre, Denmark

Team
- Curling club: Hvidovre CC, Hvidovre, DEN
- Skip: Rasmus Stjerne
- Third: Johnny Frederiksen
- Second: Mikkel Poulsen
- Lead: Oliver Dupont
- Alternate: Lars Vilandt

Curling career
- World Championship: 6 (2008, 2009, 2010, 2012, 2013, 2016)
- European Championship: 9 (2007, 2008, 2009, 2010, 2011, 2012, 2013, 2015, 2016)
- Olympic: 3 (2010, 2014, 2018)
Medal record
Curling
Representing Denmark
World Curling Championships
| Silver medal – second place | 2016 Basel |
European Championships
| Silver medal – second place | 2010 Champéry |
| Bronze medal – third place | 2007 Füssen |
| Bronze medal – third place | 2011 Moscow |
European Junior Challenge
| Gold medal – first place | 2005 Copenhagen |

Mikkel Adrup Poulsen (born 17 October 1984 in Hvidovre) is an internationally elite curler from Denmark.

He made his world championship debut at the 2008 World Championships in Grand Forks, North Dakota, U.S. He also competed at the 2009 Moncton World Championships. Both times Mikkel Poulsen served as the Alternate for Team Denmark.

The team has qualified for the 2010 Winter Olympics where Poulsen will again fill the Alternate position for the Danish team.

== Teammates ==
2010 Vancouver Olympic Games

Johnny Frederiksen, Fourth

Ulrik Schmidt, Third

Bo Jensen, Second

Lars Vilandt, Lead
