= Mikkel Krause =

Danish curler (born 1988)

- Curler
- Born: 2 October 1988 (age 38); Hvidovre, Denmark

Team
- Curling club: Hvidovre CC, Hvidovre, Denmark
- Skip: Mikkel Krause
- Third: Mads Nørgaard
- Second: Tobias Thune
- Lead: Henrik Holtermann
- Alternate: Oliver Rosenkrands Søe

Curling career
- Member Association: Denmark
- World Championship: 2 (2021, 2022)
- European Championship: 6 (2010, 2014, 2018, 2019, 2021, 2022)
- Olympic: 1 (2022)
Medal record
Men's curling
Representing Denmark
European Championships
Silver medal – second place	2010 Champéry
World Junior Championships
Gold medal – first place	2009 Vancouver

Mikkel Munch Krause (born 2 October 1988) is a Danish curler from Hvidovre. He is a former World Junior champion.

== Curling career ==
=== Junior ===
As a junior curler, Krause represented Denmark at seven World Junior Curling Championships. His first was in 2004, when he played second on a team skipped by Kenneth Jørgensen. The team finished 2–7 at the tournament, finishing in last place. At the 2005 World Junior Curling Championships, he was the alternate on the team but played in six games. The team improved, finishing with a 4–5 record, tied for fifth. At the 2006 World Junior Curling Championships, he played third on the team, now skipped by Rasmus Stjerne. The team again finished 4–5, tied for fifth. At the 2007 World Junior Curling Championships, the team improved once again, going 6–3 in the round robin. This put them in a tiebreaker against the United States, which they won, followed by a loss to Canada in the semifinal and Switzerland in the bronze medal game, settling for fourth overall. The team had less success at the 2008 World Junior Curling Championships, going 4–5 (7th place), but did much better in 2009. At the 2009 World Juniors, the team finished the round robin with a 7–2 record, in second place. This put them into the page playoffs in the 1 vs. 2 game against Canada. While they lost this game, they remained alive in the playoffs, and they won their semifinal match against the United States and then beat Canada in a rematch in the gold medal final. In his last year of junior eligibility, Krause was promoted as skip of the Danish team. Skipping a team of Oliver Dupont, Tobias Thune, and Troels Harry, Krause led Denmark to a 2–7 record at the 2010 World Junior Curling Championships, placing 8th.

=== Men's career ===
Krause played for the Danish men's team for the first time at the 2010 European Curling Championships. Playing third from Stjerne, the team went 6–3 in the round robin, placing fourth and making the last playoff spot. The team beat Germany in the 3 vs. 4 page playoff game, then beat Switzerland in the semifinal. The team finally met their match in the final, where they lost to Norway, winning the silver medal in the process. Krause next played for the Danish men's team at the 2014 European Curling Championships, still playing third for Stjerne. There, the team went 1–8, finishing in 9th place. Krause left the Stjerne rink in 2015.

Over the next few years, Denmark was relegated to the "C" tournament at the European Championships. Krause was tasked with skipping the Danish team at the 2018 European Championship C Division, played several months before the main tournament. Krause and teammates Mads Nørgaard, Daniel Abrahamsen and Ulrik Damm won the tournament with a perfect 8–0 record, securing Denmark a spot at the B Division of the main tournament. Denmark also won the B Division, earning the country a berth at the 2019 European Curling Championships. Krause skipped the Danish team at the 2019 Euros as well and led his team of Nørgaard, Tobias Engelhardt, Henrik Holtermann, and Kasper Wiksten to a 5–4 round robin record. This put them in the playoffs, where they lost the semifinal to Switzerland's Yannick Schwaller rink and the bronze medal game to Scotland's Ross Paterson team.

Krause played in his first World Men's Curling Championships in 2021, throwing fourth stones on the team, which is skipped by Nørgård. The team finished in eleventh place with a 3–10 record.

=== Mixed career ===
Krause represented Denmark at the 2014 European Mixed Curling Championship, playing third for Madeleine Dupont. The team won their group with a 7–1 record but lost to Switzerland in the quarterfinals.

== Personal life ==
Krause works as a forwarder or courier. He is the son of four-time Danish Olympian and three-time worlds bronze medal winner Malene Krause and ten-time Danish men's champion Gert Larsen, who represented Denmark once at the Winter Olympics.
