= Oliver Dupont =

Danish curler

- Curler
- Born: 16 January 1990 (age 36); Frederiksberg, Denmark

Team
- Curling club: Hvidovre CC, Hvidovre, DEN
- Skip: Rasmus Stjerne
- Third: Johnny Frederiksen
- Second: Mikkel Poulsen
- Lead: Oliver Dupont
- Alternate: Lars Vilandt

Curling career
- World Championship: 2 (2014, 2016)
- World Mixed Doubles Championship: 2 (2012, 2015)
- European Championship: 3 (2014, 2015, 2016)
- Olympic: 1 (2018)
Medal record
Curling
Representing Denmark
World Curling Championships
Silver medal – second place	2016 Basel
World Junior Championships
Gold medal – first place	2009 Vancouver

Oliver Dupont (born 16 January 1990) is a Danish curler. He won a gold medal at the 2009 World Junior Curling Championships.

== Career ==
=== Juniors ===
As a junior curler, Dupont competed in five consecutive World Junior Curling Championships with Denmark from 2006 to 2010. Denmark's best result was in 2009, when they won their first ever junior title. Dupont's all-time World Junior Curling Championship personal record is 22–19.

=== Mixed doubles and men's ===
Dupont jumped into mixed curling, competing in the 2012 World Mixed Doubles Curling Championship with Mette de Neergard. They finished in 9th. He later curled at the 2015 World Mixed Doubles Curling Championship with his sister, Denise. They placed 5th.

Dupont is a two-time Danish mixed doubles curling champion curler (in 2012 with Mette de Neergaard, in 2015 with Denise Dupont).

At the 2014 European Curling Championships, Dupont and his team finished in ninth. However, Denmark had already qualified for the 2014 World Men's Championships the year before, and the Hvidore CC traveled to Beijing to compete. Dupont was an alternate, but ended up playing. Denmark finished in 12th.

Dupont has also competes at various World Curling Tour events, most recently the 2013 German Masters and 2014 Baden Masters.

== Personal life ==
Oliver comes from a curling family. Dupont's father, Kim, competed at the 1980 and 1981 World Junior Curling Championships. They both curled for Hvidore CC. His sister, Denise, has competed at the 2006 and 2010 Olympics, as well as nine World Championships. His other sister, Madeleine, competed at the 2010 Olympics, and won the Frances Brodie Award in 2004.

He is engaged to Russian curler Viktoria Moiseeva.
