= Bo Jensen =

Danish curler

- Curler ♂
- Born: 2 February 1976 (age 50); Copenhagen, Denmark
- Height: 175 cm (5 ft 9 in)

Curling career
- World Championship: 8 (2001, 2002, 2004, 2005, 2007, 2008, 2009, 2010)
- European Championship: 5 (1999, 2006, 2007, 2008, 2009)
- Olympic: 1 (2010)
Medal record
Curling
Representing Denmark
| Silver medal – second place | 1999 Chamonix |
| Bronze medal – third place | 2007 Füssen |

Bo Jensen (born 2 February 1976 in Copenhagen) is an internationally elite curler from Denmark.

For the 2009/2010 competitive season he has played Second for Ulrik Schmidt's team from Denmark. At the 2009 Moncton World Championships Team Denmark placed seventh with a 5 - 6 record. This, combined with their eleventh and ninth-place finishes at the 2007 and 2008 Worlds, earned them the eighth qualifying spot for the 2010 Winter Olympics held in Vancouver, British Columbia, Canada.

== Teammates ==
| Season | Skip | Third | Second | Lead | Alternate | Events |
|---|---|---|---|---|---|---|
| 2000–01 | Johnny Frederiksen | Henrik Jakobsen | Lars Vilandt | Bo Jensen | | 2001 WMCC |
| 2001–02 | Ulrik Schmidt | Lasse Lavrsen | Carsten Svensgaard | Bo Jensen | | 2002 WMCC |
| 2009–10 | Johnny Frederiksen (fourth) | Ulrik Schmidt (skip) | Bo Jensen | Lars Vilandt | Mikkel Poulsen | 2010 OG |
