= 2019 World Senior Curling Championships =

- Host city: Stavanger, Norway
- Arena: Sørmarka Arena
- Dates: 20–27 April
- Men's winner: Canada
- Curling club: Russell Curling Club, Russell
- Skip: Bryan Cochrane
- Third: Ian MacAulay
- Second: Morgan Currie
- Lead: Ken Sullivan
- Finalist: Scotland
- Women's winner: Canada
- Curling club: Nutana Curling Club, Saskatoon
- Skip: Sherry Anderson
- Third: Patty Hersikorn
- Second: Brenda Goertzen
- Lead: Anita Silvernagle
- Finalist: Denmark

The 2019 World Senior Curling Championships was held in Stavanger, Norway from 20 to 27 April 2019. The event was held in conjunction with the 2019 World Mixed Doubles Curling Championship.

== Men ==
=== Round robin standings ===
Final round robin standings

Key
Teams to playoffs

Group A	Skip	W	L
Sweden	Per Carlsén	6	0
Australia	Hugh Millikin	5	1
New Zealand	Hans Frauenlob	4	2
Czech Republic	Radek Klíma	3	3
Hong Kong	Peter Chun Ngok Wong	2	4
France	Jean-Claude Girodon	1	5
Turkey	Murat Akın	0	6

Group B	Skip	W	L
Canada	Bryan Cochrane	6	0
Norway	Flemming Davanger	5	1
Germany	Uwe Saile	3	3
Italy	Antonio Menardi	3	3
Kazakhstan	Viktor Kim*	2	4
Russia	Igor Minin	2	4
Netherlands	Jan De Jong	0	6

Group C	Skip	W	L
Scotland	David Smith	6	0
Switzerland	Stefan Karnusian	5	1
Poland	Krzysztof Nowak	4	2
Ireland	Bill Gray	2	4
Japan	Mitsuyoshi Fujisawa	2	4
Slovakia	Milan Bubeník	2	4
England	David Tranmer	0	6

Group D	Skip	W	L
Denmark	Ulrik Schmidt	4	1
United States	Geoff Goodland	3	2
Wales	Adrian Meikle	3	2
Latvia	Ansis Regža	3	2
Belgium	John Robillard	1	4
Finland	Oiva Manninen	1	4

*Kim was suspended by the WCF after an incident in their match against Canada in draw 8. He was replaced as skip by Roman Kazimirchik.

=== Playoffs ===
Qualification games
8 Australia	9
9 Wales	2
5 United States	12
12 Germany	6
6 Norway	8
11 New Zealand	2
7 Switzerland	8
10 Poland	3

Quarterfinals
1 Canada	7
8 Australia	2
4 Denmark	6
5 United States	4
3 Scotland	9
6 Norway	7
2 Sweden	2
7 Switzerland	5

Semifinals
1 Canada	7
4 Denmark	4
3 Scotland	6
7 Switzerland	1

Final
1 Canada	7
3 Scotland	5
Third place
4 Denmark	7
7 Switzerland	4

=== Final standings ===
Place	Team
1st place, gold medalist(s)	Canada
2nd place, silver medalist(s)	Scotland
3rd place, bronze medalist(s)	Denmark
4	Switzerland
5	Sweden
6	United States
7	Norway
8	Australia
9	Wales

Place	Team
10	Poland
11	New Zealand
12	Germany
13	Latvia
14	Ireland
15	Italy
16	Czech Republic
17	Japan
18	Belgium

Place	Team
19	Hong Kong
20	Kazakhstan
21	Finland
22	Russia
23	Slovakia
24	France
25	England
26	Turkey
27	Netherlands

== Women ==
=== Round robin standings ===
Final round robin standings

Key
Teams to playoffs

Group A	Skip	W	L
Canada	Sherry Anderson	7	0
Sweden	Anette Norberg	6	1
United States	Margie Smith	5	2
Finland	Mari Hansen	4	3
Hong Kong	Grace Bugg	3	4
Russia	Tatiana Smirnova	1	6
Lithuania	Gaiva Valatkienė	1	6
Australia	Sandy Gagnon	1	6

Group B	Skip	W	L
Denmark	Lene Bidstrup Nyboe	6	1
Scotland	Susan Kesley	6	1
Switzerland	Chantal Forrer	5	2
England	Judith Dixon	3	4
Japan	Miyuki Kawamura	3	4
Italy	Grazia Ferrero	3	4
Latvia	Elēna Kāpostiņa	2	5
New Zealand	Elizabeth Matthews	0	7

=== Playoffs ===
Qualification
A2	Sweden	2
B3	Switzerland	11
B2	Scotland	5
A3	United States	1

Semifinals
A1	Canada	7
B2	Scotland	3
B1	Denmark	9
B3	Switzerland	2

Final
A1	Canada	10
B1	Denmark	1
Bronze medal game
B2	Scotland	3
B3	Switzerland	8

=== Final standings ===
Place	Team
1st place, gold medalist(s)	Canada
2nd place, silver medalist(s)	Denmark
3rd place, bronze medalist(s)	Switzerland
4	Scotland
5	United States
6	Sweden
7	England
8	Finland

Place	Team
9	Japan
10	Hong Kong
11	Russia
12	Italy
13	Lithuania
14	Latvia
15	Australia
16	New Zealand
