= Rasmus Stjerne =

Danish curler

- Curler
- Born: 26 May 1988 (age 38); Hvidovre, Denmark

Team
- Curling club: Hvidovre CC, Hvidovre, Denmark
- Skip: Rasmus Stjerne
- Third: Johnny Frederiksen
- Second: Mikkel Poulsen
- Lead: Oliver Dupont
- Alternate: Lars Vilandt

Curling career
- Member Association: Denmark
- World Championship: 4 (2012, 2013, 2014, 2016)
- European Championship: 7 (2010, 2011, 2012, 2013, 2014, 2015, 2016)
- Olympic: 2 (2014, 2018)
Medal record
Men's curling
Representing Denmark
World Curling Championships
Silver medal – second place	2016 Basel
European Championships
Silver medal – second place	2010 Champéry
Bronze medal – third place	2011 Moscow
World Junior Championships
Gold medal – first place	2009 Vancouver
European Junior Challenge
Gold medal – first place	2005 Copenhagen

Rasmus Stjerne Hansen (born 26 May 1988 in Hvidovre) is a Danish curler. He is a former world junior champion and world men's silver medalist. He curls out of the Hvidovre Curling Club.

== Career ==
Stjerne participated in six World Junior Championships. He played as third for Kenneth Jørgensen in 2004 and 2005, finishing outside of the playoffs in both years. He then skipped his own team at the World Juniors in 2006, 2007, and 2008, finishing fifth, fourth, and seventh, respectively. Then, in the 2009 World Junior Curling Championships, Stjerne and his team made the playoffs as the second-ranked team. They were defeated by Canada in the page 1 vs. 2 game, but rebounded with a win over the United States in the semifinal and defeated Canada in the final to win the gold medal.

Stjerne skipped a team at the 2010 European Curling Championships, and led his team to the playoffs. Stjerne defeated Germany's Andy Kapp in the page 3 vs. 4 game and then edged Switzerland's Christof Schwaller to play Norway in the gold medal game. Norway's Thomas Ulsrud won a close game over Stjerne, leaving him the silver medal. He was defeated by his father, Tommy Stjerne, in a tournament that decided the Danish representatives at the 2011 Ford World Men's Curling Championship, and went with his father's team as their coach. Stjerne returned the next year at the 2011 European Curling Championships and again made the playoffs, but lost in an extra end in the page 3 vs. 4 game to the Czech Republic's Jiri Snítil, relegating him to the bronze medal game. However, Stjerne defeated Snítil in nine ends on his second try, earning the bronze medal.

Stjerne represented Denmark at the 2012 World Men's Curling Championship in Basel, where Denmark finished outside of the playoffs. Later that year, he led Denmark to a 4th-place finish at the 2012 European Curling Championships. He followed this up by placing 4th at the 2013 Ford World Men's Curling Championship, and again finishing 4th at the 2013 European Curling Championships. Stjerne skipped Denmark at the 2014 Winter Olympics, leading the team to a 6th-place finish with a 4–5 record.

In his return to Basel to represent Denmark at the 2016 World Men's Curling Championship, Stjerne led his rink to a silver medal, Denmark's best world championship result ever. Denmark finished the round robin in a three-way tie for second with Japan and the United States, each with 8-3 records, but Denmark was given the 2nd place spot in the Page playoff by having defeated both Japan and the United States in the round robin. Stjerne lost the 1 vs. 2 game to Canada 5–3, then defeated the US 9-3 in the semifinal. In the gold medal game, Canadian champion Kevin Koe again defeated the Danish rink by a score of 5–3. There success occurred during the infamous "Broomgate" season, with both the Canadian and Danish teams being seen as taking advantage of the ambiguous and lenient rules around brush heads at the time.

In 2025, he came out of retirement with his former teammates Johnny Frederiksen, Mikkel Poulsen, Lars Vilandt, Oliver Dupont, to win the Danish Men's Curling Championship. They would repeat the previous years success by winning the championship again in 2026.

== Personal life ==
Stjerne graduated with a degree in business administration from the Copenhagen Business School. Stjerne's father, Tommy Stjerne, is an accomplished curler and a former world bronze medalist.
