= Tommy Stjerne =

Danish curler

Tommy Stjerne (born 20 July 1957 in Copenhagen) is a Danish curler.

Stjerne curls out of Hvidovre Curling Club outside Copenhagen. He has represented Denmark in the 1977, 1981, 1983, 1986, 1989, 1990, and 1998 World Curling Championships. His best finish was a bronze in 1990. He skipped his team to win the 2010 Danish Curling Championship. His son (Rasmus Stjerne) skipped the Danish team to a silver medal in the 2010 European Curling Championships. He will represent Denmark in the 2011 Ford World Men's Curling Championship in Regina, Saskatchewan. His rink consists of him as skip, Per Berg as vice, Peter Andersen as second, Anders Søderblom as lead, and Jan Nebelong as alternate.
