= Lene Bidstrup =

Danish curler

Medal record

Representing Denmark

Women's Curling

World Senior Curling Championships
Silver medal – second place	2019 Stavanger	

World Championships
Bronze medal – third place	1999 St.John	
Bronze medal – third place	2001 Lausanne	

European Championships
Silver medal – second place	1997 Füssen	
Silver medal – second place	2001 Vierumäki	

World Junior Curling Championships
Bronze medal – third place	1988 Chamonix	

Lene Bidstrup Nyboe (born 19 August 1966 in Copenhagen) is a Danish curler. She played for Denmark on 1992 and 2002 Winter Olympic games.
