= Johnny Frederiksen =

Danish curler

- Curler
- Born: 31 July 1975 (age 51); Hvidovre, Denmark

Team
- Curling club: Hvidovre CC, Hvidovre, DEN
- Skip: Rasmus Stjerne
- Third: Johnny Frederiksen
- Second: Mikkel Poulsen
- Lead: Oliver Dupont
- Alternate: Lars Vilandt

Curling career
- World Championship: 11 (2001, 2004, 2005, 2007, 2008, 2009, 2010, 2012, 2013, 2014, 2016)
- European Championship: 10 (2006, 2007, 2008, 2009, 2010, 2011, 2012, 2013, 2015, 2016)
- Olympic: 3 (2010, 2014, 2018)
Medal record
Curling
Representing Denmark
World Curling Championships
Silver medal – second place	2016 Basel
European Championships
Silver medal – second place	2010 Champéry
Bronze medal – third place	2007 Füssen
Bronze medal – third place	2011 Moscow

Johnny Frederiksen (born 31 July 1975 in Hvidovre) is a Danish curler from Copenhagen. He is the skip of the men's Danish national team.

Frederiksen skipped Denmark at three World Junior Curling Championships (1994, 1995, 1996), two European Curling Championships (2006, 2007) and five World Curling Championships (2001, 2004, 2005, 2007, 2008). Frederiksen's best performance at the World Championships was a 2nd-place finish in 2016.

Frederiksen skipped the Danish team to a bronze medal at the 2007 European Curling Championships.

== Teammates ==
2010 Vancouver Olympic Games

Ulrik Schmidt, Skip

Bo Jensen, Second

Lars Vilandt, Lead

Mikkel Poulsen, Alternate

== Personal life ==
His father Ivan is also curler and is a coach.
