= Danish Men's Curling Championship =

The Danish Men's Curling Championship is the national championship of men's curling in Denmark. It has been held annually since 1971.

== List of champions ==
Year	Skip	Club
1971	Mogens Olsen	FCC (Frederiksberg)
1972	Viggo Hunæus	CCC (København)
1973	Viggo Hunæus	CCC
1974	Flemming Pedersen	HCC (Hvidovre)
1975	John Kjærulff	HCC
1976	Ole Larsen	HCC
1977	Tommy Stjerne	HCC
1978	Arvid Petersen	HCC
1979	Per Berg	HCC
1980	Jørn Blach	HCC
1981	Tommy Stjerne	HCC
1982	Per Berg	HCC
1983	Tommy Stjerne	HCC
1984	Christian Thune	GCC (Gentofte)
1985	Frants Gufler	FCC
1986	Tommy Stjerne	HCC
1987	Gert Larsen	HCC
1988	Gert Larsen	HCC
1989	Tommy Stjerne	HCC
1990	Tommy Stjerne	HCC
1991	Christian Thune	HCC
1992	Tommy Stjerne	HCC
1993	Gert Larsen	HCC
1994	Gert Larsen	HCC
1995	Gert Larsen	HCC
1996	Ulrik Schmidt	HCC
1997	Tommy Stjerne	HCC
1998	Tommy Stjerne	HCC
1999	Ulrik Schmidt	HCC
2000	Ulrik Schmidt	HCC
2001	Johnny Frederiksen	HCC
2002	Ulrik Schmidt	HCC
2003	Ulrik Schmidt	HCC
2004	Johnny Frederiksen	HCC
2005	Johnny Frederiksen	HCC
2006	Ulrik Schmidt	HCC
2007	Johnny Frederiksen	HCC
2008	Johnny Frederiksen	HCC
2009	Ulrik Schmidt	HCC
2010	Ulrik Schmidt	HCC
2011	Tommy Stjerne	HCC
2012	Rasmus Stjerne	HCC
2013	Rasmus Stjerne	HCC
2014	Rasmus Stjerne	HCC
2015	Johnny Frederiksen	HCC
2016	Rasmus Stjerne	HCC
2017	Rasmus Stjerne	HCC
2018	Rasmus Stjerne	HCC
2019	Rasmus Stjerne	HCC
2020	Tobias Thune	GCC/TCC (Tårnby)
2021	not held	
2022	Rasmus Stjerne	HCC
2023	Mikkel Krause	HCC
2024	Jacob Schmidt	HCC
2025	Rasmus Stjerne	HCC
2026	Rasmus Stjerne	HCC

== See also ==
- Danish Women's Curling Championship
- Danish Mixed Curling Championship
- Danish Mixed Doubles Curling Championship
- Danish Junior Curling Championships
- Danish Senior Curling Championships
