= Olle Brudsten =

Swedish male curler and coach

- Curler ♂
- Born: 22 March 1962 (age 64); Söderhamn

Team
- Curling club: Sundbybergs CK, Sundbyberg, Härnösands CK, Härnösand

Curling career
- Member Association: Sweden
Medal record
Curling
Swedish mixed championship
Gold medal – first place	1988

Olle Brudsten (born 22 March 1962 in Söderhamn) is a Swedish curler and curling coach.

As a curler he is a 1988 Swedish mixed champion.

== Teams ==
=== Mixed ===
Season	Skip	Third	Second	Lead	Events
1987–88	Mikael Karlsson	Carina Pantzar	Olle Brudsten	Jessica Sonelius	SMxCC 1988 (gold)

== Record as a coach of national teams ==
Year	Tournament, event	National team	Place
1994	1994 European Curling Championships	Czech Republic (men)	15
1994	1994 European Curling Championships	Czech Republic (women)	8
1995	1995 European Curling Championships	Czech Republic (men)	18
1995	1995 European Curling Championships	Czech Republic (women)	10
1998	1998 European Curling Championships	Denmark (men)	7
1998	1998 European Curling Championships	Denmark (women)	3rd place, bronze medalist(s)
1999	1999 European Curling Championships	Denmark (women)	6
2000	2000 World Junior Curling Championships	Denmark (junior men)	4
2000	2000 World Women's Curling Championship	Denmark (women)	6
2000	2000 European Curling Championships	Denmark (women)	6
2001	2001 World Men's Curling Championship	Denmark (men)	10
2002	2002 World Junior Curling Championships	Denmark (junior men)	7
2002	2002 Winter Olympics	Denmark (women)	9
2002	2002 World Women's Curling Championship	Denmark (women)	6
2002	2002 World Men's Curling Championship	Denmark (men)	5
2005	2005 World Wheelchair Curling Championship	Sweden (wheelchair)	4
2006	2006 Winter Paralympics	Sweden (wheelchair)	3rd place, bronze medalist(s)
2008	2008 World Wheelchair Curling Championship	Sweden (wheelchair)	6
2019	2019 Winter Universiade	Sweden (students men)	5
