= Lars Vilandt =

Danish curler

- Curler
- Born: 22 August 1974 (age 52); Rodovre, Denmark

Team
- Curling club: Hvidovre CC, Hvidovre, Denmark
- Skip: Rasmus Stjerne
- Third: Johnny Frederiksen
- Second: Mikkel Poulsen
- Lead: Oliver Dupont
- Alternate: Lars Vilandt

Curling career
- World Championship: 10 (2001, 2004, 2005, 2007, 2008, 2009, 2010, 2012, 2013, 2014)
- European Championship: 7 (2006, 2007, 2008, 2009, 2011, 2012, 2013)
- Olympic: 2 (2010, 2014)
Medal record
Curling
Representing Denmark
European Championships
Bronze medal – third place	2007 Füssen
Bronze medal – third place	2011 Moscow

Lars Vilandt (born 22 August 1974) is a Danish curler from Hvidovre.

He made his world championship debut at the 2001 Lausanne World Championships with a team skippered by Johnny Frederiksen. At the 2009 Moncton World Championships his team placed fifth with a 5–6 record. These three results would be good enough to qualify a team to the 2010 Winter Olympics in Vancouver, British Columbia, Canada.

== Teammates ==
2010 Vancouver Olympic Games

Johnny Frederiksen, Fourth

Ulrik Schmidt, Skip

Bo Jensen, Lead

== Teammates ==
2014 Sochi Olympic Games

Rasmus Stjerne, Skip

Johnny Frederiksen, third

Mikkel Poulsen, Second

Troels Harry, Lead

James Dryburgh, Coach
