= Malene Krause =

Danish curler and coach

- Curler
- Born: 18 June 1963 (age 63); Frederiksberg, Denmark

Curling career
- World Championship: 14 (1980,1981,1985-1988,1990-1992, 1999-2003)
- European Championship: 14 (1980, 1981, 1983, 1984, 1989, 1990, 1991, 1992, 1999, 2000, 2001, 2002, 2003, 2005)
- Olympic: 4 (1988,1992, 2002, 2006)
Medal record
Women's Curling
Representing Denmark
World championships
Bronze medal – third place	1990 Vesteros
Bronze medal – third place	1999 St.John
Bronze medal – third place	2001 Lausanne
European championships
Gold medal – first place	1994 Sundsvall
Silver medal – second place	2001 Vierumäki
Silver medal – second place	2002 Grindelwald
Bronze medal – third place	1981 Grindelwald
Bronze medal – third place	2003 Courmayeur
Bronze medal – third place	2005 Garmisch-Partenkirchen

Malene Krause (born 18 June 1963 in Frederiksberg) is a Danish curler and curling coach. She is a four-time Olympian, having competed in the curling exhibition events in 1988 and 1992, and then the full curling events in 2002 and 2006. Her best Olympic result was a fourth-place finish in 1992, when her team lost the bronze medal match to Canada. Krause also competed in 14 World Championships and 14 European Championships, earning medals three times and five times, respectively. Her team's best finish was winning the gold medal at the 1994 European Curling Championships.

She is the mother of former World Junior Champion Mikkel Krause, skip of Denmark's team at the 2022 Winter Olympic Games.
