= Ulrik Schmidt =

Danish curler

- Curler
- Born: 19 August 1962 (age 64); Copenhagen, Denmark

Team
- Curling club: Hvidovre CC, Hvidovre

Curling career
- World Championship: 9 (1997, 1999, 2000, 2002, 2003, 2006, 2008, 2009, 2010)
- European Championship: 13 (1987, 1991, 1996, 1997, 1999, 2000, 2001, 2002, 2003, 2004, 2005, 2008, 2009)
Medal record
Men's Curling
World Senior Curling Championships
| Bronze medal – third place | 2019 Stavanger |
European Curling Championships
| Silver medal – second place | 1997 Füssen |
| Silver medal – second place | 1999 Chamonix |
| Silver medal – second place | 2000 Oberstdorf |
| Bronze medal – third place | 2003 Courmayeur |

Ulrik Schmidt (born 19 August 1962) is a Danish curler from Holte. He is the former skip for the Danish national team.

Schmidt's first international appearance was at the 1984 World Junior Curling Championships, in Cornwall, Ontario, Canada, where he skipped the Danish team to a 9th-place finish. His first men's championship was in 1987 European Curling Championships, placing fourth. He was the team's alternate at the 1991 Euros, skipped by Gert Larsen, placing 6th.

Schmidt skipped his own team beginning in 1996. That season, he finished 5th at the European Championships and 6th at the 1997 Ford World Men's Curling Championship. Later that year, he won a silver medal at the 1997 European Championships, where he lost to Germany (skipped by Andy Kapp) in the final.

Schmidt didn't return to international competition until the 1999 Ford World Men's Curling Championship, where he placed 6th. Later in the year, he won another silver at the Euros, losing to Scotland this time in the final, skipped by Hammy McMillan. At the 2000 Ford World Men's Curling Championship, he placed 5th. In 2000, he won another European silver medal, losing to Finland (skipped by Markku Uusipaavalniemi) in the final. He did not play in the Worlds that season.

Schmidt represented Denmark at the 2002 Winter Olympics, skipping the team to a 7th-place finish. At the 2002 Ford World Men's Curling Championship, he finished in 5th. He finished 5th at the 2002 European Championship as well. At the 2003 Ford World Men's Curling Championship, he finished 6th.

At the 2003 European Championship, Schmidt won a bronze medal. In 2004, he finished 6th and 2005 he finished 6th once again. He did not return to a World Championship until 2006, where he finished 8th. He teamed up with Frederiksen at the 2008 World Men's Curling Championship, finishing 9th. At the 2008 European Curling Championships, Schmidt would return as the team's skip, with Frederiksen as fourth player. They finished in 5th. In the 2009 Ford World Men's Curling Championship, he qualified Denmark and the team for the 2010 Olympics, where he finished 9th.

In 2017, 2018 and 2019 he skipped the Danish team at the World Senior Curling Championships. In 2019 he won a bronze medal.

After his active career, he has been the sport director for both Italy and Denmark and coached at over 30 European and world championships and Olympics.

== Personal life ==
Schmidt is married and works as a management consultant.

He has two children.
