= Swiss Senior Curling Championships =

National curling competition in Switzerland

The Swiss Senior Curling Championships are the national championships of men's and women's senior curling teams in Switzerland. Senior level curlers must be over the age of 50. The championships have been held annually since 1973 for senior men and since 2003 for senior women. The championships are organized by the Swiss Curling Association.

== Men ==
=== Champions ===
Year	Host city	Winning curling club (city)	Winning team (in order: fourth, third, second, lead, alternate, skips marked bold)
1973	Montana	Biel-Touring CC	André Witschger, Paul Schär, Toni Widmer, Edgar Flückiger
1974	Villars-sur-Ollon	Lausanne-Montchoisi CC	Jaques Meyer, Hubert Reymondin, Alexandre Plancherel, Antoine Glardon
1975	Arlesheim	Basel-Wartenberg CC	Erwin Flur, Alfred Schimpf, Otto Jenni, Hans-Rudolf Krähenbühl
1976	Weinfelden	Gümligen CC	Ernst Badertscher, Felix de Florin, Edwin Felix, Hans Badertscher
1977	Grindelwald	Bern-Bantiger CC	Hans Moser, Hans Gerber, Franz Loosli, Kurt Braunwalder
1978	Wildhaus	Kloten CC	Hans Stephan, Walter Bachmann, Hans Nauer, Ernst Weber
1979	Gstaad	Luzern-City CC	Max Ammann, Roland Schmid, Karl Ziltener, Karl Treier
1980	Arlesheim	Basel-Wartenberg CC	Erwin Flur, Fritz Kübler, Alfred Schimpf, Gottfried Käumlen
1981	Wildhaus	Biel-Touring CC	René Evard, Josef Lanz, Walter Neeser, Egon Grubenmann
1982	Geneva	Luzern-Blauweiss CC	Mario Paulitti, Bernhard Etienne, Georg Speri, Aloïs Kreuzer
1983	Biel/Bienne	Luzern-City CC	Karl Ziltener, Roland Schmid, Herbert Mattle, Fränzi Ziltener
1984	Wallisellen	Zürich-Blauweiss CC	Hans Meister, Walter Altorfer, Arthur Schuppisser, Fritz Kohler
1985	Leukerbad	Thun-Kyburg CC	Fritz Brunner, Hans Bischoff, Kurt Gerber, Werner Bieri
1986	Bern	Thun-Kyburg CC	Fritz Brunner, Hans Bischoff, Kurt Gerber, Werner Bieri
1987	Wildhaus	Biel-Bienne CC	Jean Jungen, Hans Hirt, Jean Freudiger, Willy Günthart
1988	Gstaad	Bern-Wildstrubel CC	Heinz Weber, Urs Fischer, Heinz Wyser, Peppino Vicini
1989	Wildhaus	St. Galler Bär CC	Philipp von Stokar, Rudolf Grauer, Ernst Ritzmann, Domenic Adorni
1990	Kandersteg	Genève CC	Jean-Jacques Vecchio, Jean-Fr. Dentand, Bernard Dupont, Roger Geser
1991	Leukerbad	Thun-Kyburg CC	Walter Eggler, Hans Bischoff, Kurt Gerber, Arthur Ryter
1992	Thun	Zürich-Zürichberg CC	Alfred Sütterlin, Karl Foitek, Ulrich Siegrist, Kurt Schneller
1993	Wildhaus	Zürich-Zürichberg CC	Alfred Sütterlin, Karl Foitek, Ulrich Siegrist, Kurt Schneller
1994	Morges	Gümligen CC	Rudolf Pichler, Herbert Ingold, Robert Hubler, Hermann Fuhrer
1995	Baden-Baregg	Burgdorf CC	Walter Maurer, Anton Gfeller, Peter Häberli, Kurt Marti/Hans-Ulrich Althaus
1996	Wildhaus	Zermatt CC	Willy Bayard, Amédéé Biner, Peter Anton Biner, Rita Rieser
1997	Morges	Wädenswil-Zimmerberg CC	Fredy Almer, Jakob Schenk, Alfred Pfenninger, Erika Almer
1998	Kandersteg	Zürich-Blauweiss CC	Karl Grossmann, Stefan Tirinzoni, Hanspeter Nauer, Heinz Meierhofer
1999	Wallisellen	Frauenfeld CC	Carlo Stoll, Hermann Rutz, Ulrich Portner, Remo Tinner
2000	Olten	Olten CC	Hans-Peter Studer, Manfred Graber, Peter Känzig, Georg Studer
2001	Lausanne	Wetzikon CC	Urs Theiler, Charles Pfammatter, René Joller, Ernst Kuhn/Walter Halder
2002	Wetzikon	Basel-Ice Fleas CC	Alfred Germann, Guido Cacccivio, Peter Arnold, Werner von Ballmoos
2003	Bern	Basel-Victoria CC	Hans-Peter Zimmermann, Theo Fonk, Hans Müller, Urs Steffen/Felix Kellerhals
2004	Morges	Baden-Regio CC	Ueli Müller, Bruno Küttel, Hans Richner, Albert Styger
2005	Lausanne	Baden-Regio CC	Ueli Müller, Bruno Küttel, Hans Richner, Albert Styger
2006	Arlesheim	Dübendorf CC	Mattias Neuenschwander, Bernhard Attinger, Peter Attinger Jr., Anton Knobe
2007	Küsnacht	Dübendorf CC	Mattias Neuenschwander, Michael Müller, Heinz Kneubühler, Marc Syfrig, alternate: Fritz Widmer
2008	Arlesheim	Solothurn-Ambassadoren CC	Hugo Jäggi, Peter Weber, Joos Laubscher, Silvio Novaglia, alternate: Bruno Burkhard
2009	Baden	Bern Inter CC	André Pauli, Fritz Pulver, Pierre Zürcher, Daniel Grünenfelder
2010	Wetzikon	Bern Inter CC	Fritz Pulfer, Pierre Zürcher, Heinz Kneubühler, Daniel Grünenfelder, alternate: André Pauli
2011	Wetzikon	Zürich-Stadt CC	Dieter Strub, Peter Kröger, Hans-Jörg Andres, Micky Lepori

=== Champions and medallists ===
Team line-ups shows in order: fourth, third, second, lead, alternate, coach, skips marked bold.

Year	Host city	Champion	Runner-up	Bronze
2012	Wetzikon	Dübendorf III (Dübendorf); Roland Kniel, Peter Jauch, Heinz Kneubühler, Bernhard Attinger	Dolder Turicum; Heinz Meierhofer, Hanspeter Nauer, Hausi Maag, Karl Grossmann	Olten (Olten); Hansrudolf Schütz, Felix Meier, Micha Mercatali, Ernst Lehmann
2013	Biel/Bienne	Dübendorf 3 (Dübendorf); Werner Attinger, Peter Attinger Jr., Ronald Müller, Anton Knobel	Baden Regio (Baden); Hansjörg Bless, Gerhard Schlösser, Josef Moser, Ueli Sax, alternate: Peter Roth	Bern Gurten (Bern); Stefan Signer, Hans Wirz, Gerhard Kurt, Jürg Denecke
2014	Thun	Luzern-City (Luzern); Martin Zürrer, Dieter Wüest, Nick Gartenmann, Marc Syfrig	Solothurn-Wengi 1 (Solothurn); Jürg Gnägi, Alfred Wyler, Stefan Schneider, René Fuchs, alternate: Emch Dieter	Baden Regio (Baden); Thomas Heimann, Peter Roth, Josef Moser, Ueli Sax, alternate: Hansjörg Bless
2015	Küssnacht	Bern-Gurten (Bern); Stefan Signer, Jürg Denecke, Gerhard Kurt, Daniel Grünenfelder	Gstaad (Gstaad); Stefan Karnusian, Kurt Reichenbach, Rudi Hari, Richard Pernet	Dübendorf 1 (Dübendorf); Werner Attinger, Peter Attinger Jr., Ronny Müller, Toni Knobel
2016	Wetzikon	results and teams not shown in source, dates and host city only		
2017	Wetzikon	Gstaad (Gstaad); Stefan Karnusian, Kurt Reichenbach, Stewart Dryburgh, Richard Pernet	Dübendorf (Dübendorf); Werner Attinger, Peter Attinger Jr., Ronny Müller, Marc Brügger, alternate: Anton Knobel	Dolder Turicum; Jacques Greiner, Hanspeter Nauer, Hansruedi Maag, Heinz Meierhofer
2018	Biel/Bienne	Luzern-City (Luzern); Dieter Wüest, Jens Piesbergen, Martin Zürrer, Marc Syfrig, alternate: Ernst Erb	Gstaad 2 (Gstaad); Stefan Karnusian, Kurt Reichenbach, Stewart Dryburgh, Florian Zoergiebel	Solothurn Biber (Solothurn); Christof Schwaller, Markus Känzig, Christoph Kaiser, Pierre Hug
2019	Bern	Gstaad-Morges (Gstaad/Morges); Stefan Karnusian, Stewart Dryburgh, Kurt Reichenbach, Florian Zoergiebel	Solothurn Regio (Solothurn); Christof Schwaller, Markus Känzig, Christoph Kaiser, Pierre Hug	Gstaad (Gstaad); Traugott Ellenberger, Michael Brand, Bruno Mösching, Rolf Sollberger
2020	Bern	Luzern City (Luzern); Dieter Wüest, Jens Piesbergen, Martin Zürrer, Marc Syfrig, Ernst Erb	Bern Capitals (Bern); Stefan Signer, Jürg Denecke, Gerhard Kurt, Pierre Krüttli, Richard Stern	Solothurn Regio (Solothurn); Christof Schwaller, Markus Känzig, Robert Hürlimann, Pierre Hug
2021	championship not held			
2022	Wetzikon	Solothurn Regio (Solothurn); Christof Schwaller, Robert Hürlimann, Christoph Kaiser, Rolf Iseli, alternate: Pierre Hug	Luzern-City (Luzern); Dieter Wüest, Jens Piesbergen, Martin Zürrer, Marc Syfrig, alternate: Ernst Erb	Gstaad-Morges (Gstaad / Morges); Stefan Karnusian, Stewart Dryburgh, Stefan Traub, Florian Zoergiebel
2023	Bern	Solothurn Regio (Solothurn); Christof Schwaller, Robert Hürlimann, Christoph Kaiser, Rolf Iseli, alternate: Pierre Hug	Gstaad (Gstaad); Stefan Karnusian, Kurt Reichenbach, Traugott Ellenberger, Michael Brand, alternate: Stewart Dryburgh	Luzern City (Luzern); Dieter Wüest, Jens Piesbergen, Ernst Erb, Marc Syfrig, alternate: Martin Zürrer, Peter Studer
2024	St. Gallen	Solothurn Regio (Solothurn); Christof Schwaller, Dominic Andres, Robert Hürlimann, Christoph Kaiser, coach: Rolf Iseli	Gstaad (Gstaad); Stefan Karnusian, Kurt Reichenbach, Traugott Ellenberger, Michael Brand	Luzern-City (Luzern); Dieter Wüest, Jens Piesbergen, Ernst Erb, Daniel Lüthi, alternate: Marc Syfrig
2025	Geneva	Luzern-City (Luzern); Dieter Wüest, Jens Piesbergen, Ernst Erb, Daniel Lüthi	Uzwil (Uzwil); Andreas Bauer, Beat Brunner, Martin Louis, Roman Bauer	Solothurn Regio (Solothurn); Christof Schwaller, Dominic Andres, Robert Hürlimann, Christoph Kaiser, alternate: Rolf Iseli
2026	Geneva	Solothurn Regio (Solothurn); Christof Schwaller, Dominic Andres, Christoph Kaiser, Rolf Iseli	Uzwil (Uzwil); Andreas Bauer, Beat Brunner, Martin Louis, Roman Bauer	Genève (Geneva); Raphaël Brütsch, Grégory Renggli, Nicolas Carrera, Yvan Monard, Laurent Reth

== Women ==
=== Champions ===
Year	Host city	Winning curling club (city)	Winning team (in order: fourth, third, second, lead, alternate, skips marked bold)
2003	Lausanne	Grindelwald CC	Monika Weibel, Yvonne Affentranger, Margrit Lüthi, Beatrice Siegrist
2004	Wildhaus	Wildhaus-Inter CC	Susan Limena, Susanne Affeltranger, Andrea Thommann, Lotti Pieper
2005	Küssnacht	CG Wallisellen	Isabelle Wüest, Monika Burgherr, Heike Schreyer, Corinne Egloff
2006	Wetzikon	Solothurn-Wengi CC	Annette Laubscher, Katharina Gnägi, Barbara Schneider, Marianne Hofer
2007	Küsnacht	Küsnacht CC	Pavla Rubasova, Dagmar Frei, Lucy Ebner, Nadia Boillat, alternate: Irène Goridis
2008	Arlesheim	Bern Damen CC	Marianne Zürcher-Amstutz, Anita Jäggi, Marlis Kurt, Ruth Dorner
2009	Baden	Solothurn-Wengi CC	Annette Laubscher, Kathrin Gnägi, Barbara Schneider, Marianne Dick
2010	Interlaken	Solothurn-Wengi CC	Annette Laubscher, Kathrin Gnägi, Barbara Schneider, Marianne Dick, alternate: Caroline Fuchs
2011	Bern	Zürich-Stadt CC	Susanne Affeltranger, Susan Limena, Luly Ebner, Monika Giger, alternate: Ruth Maier

=== Champions and medallists ===
Team line-ups shows in order: fourth, third, second, lead, alternate, coach, skips marked bold.

Year	Host city	Champion	Runner-up	Bronze
2012—2015		championship not held		
2016	Langnau	Zug (Zug); Esther Kobler, Liliane Huwyler, Doris Wunderlin, Esther Zimmermann Steiger	Thun Regio BlueStone (Thun); Anna Müller, Monika Gafner, Tashi Blaser, Irene Beck, alternate: Daniela Gygax, coach: Cristina Lestander	Solothurn Wengi (Solothurn); Karin Felder, Kathrin Gnägi, Barbara Schneider, Annette Laubscher, alternate: Regula Kiefer
2017	championship not held			
2018	Emmental	Baden Regio (Baden); Dagmar Frei, Esther Kobler, Rosmarie von Rotz, Sylvia Schäpper	Thurgau (Thurgau); Chantal Forrer, Liliane Huwyler, Silvia Schrader, Ursula Miller, alternate: Monika Lutz	Uzwil (Uzwil); Marianne Flotron, Erna Widmer, Ursi Humbel, Karin Leutenegger
2019	Wallisellen	Thurgau (Thurgau); Chantal Forrer, Liliane Huwyler, Karin Sohmer, Ursula Miller, Monika Lutz	Baden-Luzern (Baden/Luzern); Dagmar Frei, Esther Kobler, Rosmarie von Rotz, Doris Wunderlin, alternate: Sylvia Schäpper	Granite/Swissair; Veronica Schmid, Brigitte Hegglin-Lüdi, Uschi Venzin, Monika Wyttenbach
2020	Bern	Bern Capitals (Bern); Marianne Zürcher, Marlis Kurt, Ruth Dorner, Gabi Perret-Richter, alternate: Cristina Lestander, coach: Stefan Heilmann	Baden-Luzern (Baden/Luzern); Dagmar Frei, Esther Kobler, Rosmarie von Rotz, Sylvia Schäpper, alternate: Doris Wunderlin	Wetzikon (Wetzikon); Brigitte Schläpfer, Grazia Stern, Joanne Aerne-Schmid, Christa Ackeret-Rupp, alternate: Esther Fanti
2021	championship not held			
2022	Zollbrück	Bern Inter (Bern); Cristina Lestander, Sandra Born, Silvia Gygax, Christina Gartenmann, alternate: Karin Durtschi	Baden-Luzern (Baden/Luzern); Dagmar Frei, Esther Kobler, Rosmarie von Rotz, Sylvia Schäpper, alternate: Doris Wunderlin	Bern Capitals (Bern); Marianne Zürcher, Marlis Kurt, Ruth Dorner, Gabi Perret-Richter, coach: Stefan Heilmann
2023	Bern	Thun Regio (Thun); Monika Gafner, Daniela Gygax, Susanne Hochuli, Irene Beck, coach: Peter Spielmann, Martin Graber	Bern Capitals-Oberwallis (Bern/Oberwallis); Marianne Zürcher, Diana Kaufmann, Marlis Kurt, Gabi Perret-Richter, Ruth Dorner	Baden-Luzern (Baden/Luzern); Dagmar Frei, Esther Kobler, Rosmarie von Rotz, Sylvia Schäpper, Doris Wunderlin
2024	Küssnacht	Morges (Morges); Daniela Ruetschi-Schlegel, Caroline Dryburgh, Janine Bianchetti-Oswald, Corinne Anneler, alternate: Laurence Bidaud	Luzern - Baden (Baden/Luzern); Dagmar Frei, Rosmarie von Rotz, Tatjana Portmann, Sylvia Schäpper, alternate: Doris Wunderlin	Luzern (Luzern); Nicole Strausak, Sandra Witschonke, Karin Durtschi, Sandra Born
2025	Wallisellen	Bern Capitals (Bern); Marianne Zürcher, Marlis Kurt, Ruth Dorner, Gabi Perret-Richter	Luzern (Luzern); Nicole Strausak, Karin Durtschi, Sandra Witschonke, Sandra Born, alternate: Karin Lüthi	Kloten (Kloten); Marianne Flotron, Mirjam Ott, Karin Leutenegger Baur, Monika Stadelm, alternate: Ursula Humbel-Schmid
2026	Geneva	Luzern (Luzern); Nicole Strausak, Karin Durtschi, Karin Lüthi, Sandra Born	Morges (Morges); Daniela Ruetschi-Schlegel, Caroline Dryburgh, Corinne Anneler, Silvia Ciganek	Zug (Zug); Esther Kobler, Ivana Stadler, Rosmarie von Rotz, Tatjana Portmann, coach: Flurina von Grünigen

== See also ==
- Swiss Men's Curling Championship
- Swiss Women's Curling Championship
- Swiss Mixed Doubles Curling Championship
- Swiss Mixed Curling Championship
- Swiss Wheelchair Curling Championship
- Swiss Junior Curling Championships
- Swiss Junior Mixed Doubles Curling Championship
