= Michael Lips =

Swiss curler (born 1967)

- Curler ♂
- Born: 7 May 1967 (age 59); Zürich

Team
- Curling club: CC Kloten (Kloten)

Curling career
- Member Association: Switzerland
- World Championship: 1 (1988)
- European Championship: 1 (1991)
Medal record
Curling
European Championships
| Bronze medal – third place | 1991 Chamonix |
Swiss Men's Championship
| Gold medal – first place | 1988 Lausanne-Malley |

Michael H.-J. Lips (born 7 May 1967) is a Swiss curler. At the international level, he is a 1991 European Curling Championships bronze medallist. At the national level, he is a 1988 Swiss men's champion curler.

== Teams ==
| Season | Skip | Third | Second | Lead | Alternate | Events |
|---|---|---|---|---|---|---|
| 1987–88 | Daniel Model | Beat Stephan | Michael Lips | Richard Mähr | Daniel Müller (WCC) | SMCC 1988 (gold); WCC 1988 (4th) |
| 1991–92 | Daniel Model | Mario Flückiger | Michael Lips | Thomas Lips | Marc Brügger | ECC 1991 (bronze) |
