= Richard Mähr =

Swiss male curler

- Curler ♂

Team
- Curling club: CC Kloten (Kloten)

Curling career
- Member Association: Switzerland
- World Championship: 1 (1988)
Medal record
Curling
Swiss Men's Championship
Gold medal – first place	1988 Lausanne-Malley

Richard Mähr is a Swiss curler. At the national level, he is a 1988 Swiss men's champion curler.

== Teams ==
Season	Skip	Third	Second	Lead	Alternate	Events
1987–88	Daniel Model	Beat Stephan	Michael Lips	Richard Mähr	Daniel Müller (WCC)	SMCC 1988 (gold); WCC 1988 (4th)
