= Beat Stephan =

Swiss male curler

- Curler ♂

Team
- Curling club: CC Kloten (Kloten)

Curling career
- Member Association: Switzerland
- World Championship: 2 (1988, 1990)
Medal record
Curling
Swiss Men's Championship
Gold medal – first place	1988 Lausanne-Malley
Gold medal – first place	1990 Uzwil

Beat A. Stephan is a Swiss curler.

At the national level, he is a two-time Swiss men's champion curler (1988, 1990) and Swiss mixed champion curler (1984).

== Teams ==
=== Men's ===
Season	Skip	Third	Second	Lead	Alternate	Events
1987–88	Daniel Model	Beat Stephan	Michael Lips	Richard Mähr	Daniel Müller (WCC)	SMCC 1988 (gold); WCC 1988 (4th)
1989–90	Daniel Model	Beat Stephan	Marc Brügger	Lukas Fankhauser		SMCC 1990 (gold); WCC 1990 (6th)
1996–97	Andreas Hänni	Beat A. Stephan	Thomas Lips	Stefan Gertsch		
1998–99	Andreas Hänni	Beat A. Stephan	Daniel Hersche	Thomas Perlmutter		
2012–13	Urs Beglinger (fourth)	Reto Seiler (skip)	Urs Kuhn	Beat A. Stephan		2012 SC Basel

=== Mixed ===
Season	Skip	Third	Second	Lead	Events
1984	Beat Stephan	Cristina Wirz	Simon Roth	Irène Bretscher	SMxCC 1984 (gold)
