= 1988 German Formula Three Championship =

Seasons
- ← 1987 1989 →

The 1988 German Formula Three Championship (German: 1988 Deutsche Formel-3-Meisterschaft) was a multi-event motor racing championship for single-seat open wheel formula racing cars held across Europe. The championship featured drivers competing in two-litre Formula Three racing cars which conformed to the technical regulations, or formula, for the championship. It commenced on 3 April at Zolder and ended at Hockenheim on 16 October after eleven rounds.

WTS Liqui Moly Equipe driver Joachim Winkelhock won the championship. He led the championship battle from the start of the season with a series of three consecutive wins. Otto Rensing lost seven points to Winkelhock and finished as runner-up with wins at Hockenheim and Nürburgring. Frank Biela won at Mainz Finthen and Hungaroring (the Hungarian track was in the schedule of German F3 for the first and the last time) and completed the top-three in the drivers' standings. Michael Bartels, Hanspeter Kaufmann and Wolfgang Kaufmann were the other race winners. Daniel Müller clinched the B-Cup championship title. The season was marred by the death of Csaba Kesjár in an accident at Norisring.

== Teams and drivers ==
Entry List
Team	No.	Driver	Chassis	Engine	Rounds
Class A
(West Germany) Schübel Rennsport Int.	1	(Hungary) Csaba Kesjár	Dallara 388/009	Volkswagen	1–7
(West Germany) Team der ONS Nachwuchsförderung	2	(West Germany) Ralf Kelleners	Dallara 388/008	Volkswagen	All
(West Germany) WTS Liqui Moly Equipe	3	(West Germany) Joachim Winkelhock	Reynard 883/004	Volkswagen	All
(Switzerland) JSK Generalbau	4	(Switzerland) Hanspeter Kaufmann	Dallara 388/002	Volkswagen	All
(Switzerland) JSK Generalbau	5	(Switzerland) Gianni Bianchi	Dallara 388/001	Volkswagen	1
(Switzerland) JSK Generalbau	5	(Switzerland) Franco Forini	Dallara 388/001	Volkswagen	2–11
(Switzerland) JSK Generalbau	5	(Switzerland) Daniel Müller	Dallara 388/001	Volkswagen	12
(Switzerland) JSK Generalbau	25	(Switzerland) Jacques Isler	Dallara 388/015	Volkswagen	2
(West Germany) Volkswagen Motorsport	6	(West Germany) Otto Rensing	Reynard 883/005	Volkswagen	All
(West Germany) Volkswagen Motorsport	7	(West Germany) Frank Krämer	BSR KS388/01	Volkswagen	All
(West Germany) Josef Kaufmann	8	(West Germany) Peter Zakowski	Martini MK55/03	Volkswagen	1–8
(West Germany) Josef Kaufmann	8	(Austria) Franz Binder	Martini MK55/03	Volkswagen	9, 12
(West Germany) Josef Kaufmann	8	(West Germany) Ellen Lohr	Martini MK55/03	Volkswagen	10
(West Germany) Team Sonax Autopflege	9	(West Germany) Frank Biela	Martini MK55/04	Volkswagen	All
(West Germany) Malte Bongers Motorsport	10	(West Germany) Michael Bartels	Reynard 883/001	Volkswagen	All
(West Germany) Malte Bongers Motorsport	11	(West Germany) Anreas Buhk	Reynard 883	Volkswagen	1
(West Germany) Malte Bongers Motorsport	11	(France) Franck Fréon	Reynard 883	Volkswagen	2
(West Germany) Mönninghoff Racing — Sympathik Cosmetics	12	(West Germany) Michael Roppes	Reynard 883/017	Volkswagen	All
(West Germany) Style Auto Racing Team	15	(West Germany) Wolfgang Kaufmann	Dallara 388/033	Volkswagen	All
(West Germany) Gerd Lünsmann	16	(Netherlands) Gerrit van Kouwen	Ralt RT31/710	Volkswagen	1–4, 6, 12
(Austria) Walter Lechner Racing School-Schaeffler Teppichboden	17	(West Germany) Ellen Lohr	Dallara 388/031	Volkswagen	1–4, 6–9
(Austria) Walter Lechner Racing School-Schaeffler Teppichboden	17	(West Germany) Logan Wilms	Dallara 388/031	Volkswagen	10–11
(Austria) Walter Lechner Racing School-Schaeffler Teppichboden	17	(Austria) Mercedes Stermitz	Dallara 388/031	Volkswagen	12
(West Germany) Rex Toyota F3 Team Deutschland	18	(West Germany) Stefan Neuberger	Reynard 883/016	Toyota	All
(West Germany) P+M Motorsport	21	(West Germany) Josef Bertzen	Reynard 883/012	Toyota	1–9
(Austria) Krafft Walzen Team	22	(Austria) Karl Wendlinger	Ralt RT32/763	Alfa Romeo	All
(West Germany) HC Hessel Motorsport	23	(West Germany) Marc Hessel	Dallara 388/042	Toyota	9–12
(West Germany) HC Hessel Motorsport	24	(Argentina) Víctor Rosso	Berta 88/002	Renault	9–10
(Switzerland) Formel Rennsport Club	24	(Switzerland) Jo Zeller	Ralt RT30/640	Toyota	2
(Switzerland) Formel Rennsport Club	34	(Switzerland) Franz Kaiser	Dallara 386/019	Volkswagen	9–10, 12
(Sweden) Picko Troberg Racing	27	(Sweden) Rickard Rydell	Reynard 883/045	Volkswagen	7
(Sweden) Picko Troberg Racing	28	(Sweden) Peter Albertsson	Reynard 873/083	Volkswagen	7
(West Germany) MSC Rottenegg	30	(Austria) Herbert Prügl	Ralt RT3/397	Toyota	8, 11
(Hungary) Team Castrol Racing	31	(Hungary) András Kövesdán	Ralt RT3/397	Volkswagen	4, 11
(Austria) Team Theuermann	32	(Austria) Martin Koller	Ralt RT31	Volkswagen	9
(Austria) Team Theuermann	33	(Austria) Wolfgang Petutschnig	Ralt RT30/563	Volkswagen	9
(Austria) Georg Neyer	35	(Austria) Georg Neyer	Martini MK49/08	Volkswagen	9
(Norway) Trond-Aage Krosby	35	(Norway) Trond-Aage Krosby	Ralt RT30/649	Volkswagen	11
(West Germany) Helmut Bross Racing	37	(Hungary) Kálmán Bódis	Reynard 873	Volkswagen	11
(West Germany) Ewald Gasper	38	(West Germany) Georg Arbinger	Martini MK49	Volkswagen	12
(West Germany) MCS Stuttgart	39	(West Germany) Uwe Wolpert	Ralt RT30/579	Volkswagen	10
(Denmark) Svend Hansen	40	(Denmark) Svend Hansen	Reynard 873/078	Volkswagen	12
Class B
(West Germany) Team Bernal Torantriebe	50	(West Germany) Sigi Betz	Reynard 863/030	Volkswagen	1–4, 7
(West Germany) Malte Bongers Motorsport	51	(West Germany) Anreas Buhk	Reynard 873/061	Volkswagen	2–12
(Switzerland) JSK Generalbau	52	(Switzerland) Daniel Müller	Dallara 386/023	Volkswagen	1–11
(Switzerland) JSK Generalbau	57	(Switzerland) Rene Wartmann	Reynard 873/084	Volkswagen	1–2, 4–7, 9–12
(Switzerland) JSK Generalbau	68	(Switzerland) Gianni Bianchi	Dallara 387/010	Volkswagen	5–7
(West Germany) WTS Liqui Moly Equipe	53	(West Germany) Franz Engstler	Reynard 873/087	Volkswagen	All
(West Germany) WTS Liqui Moly Equipe	68	(Switzerland) Gianni Bianchi	Dallara 387/010	Volkswagen	9–10, 12
(West Germany) Gerd Lünsmann	54	(West Germany) Gernot Sirrenburg	Reynard 873/045	Volkswagen	2–3, 8–10
(West Germany) Gerd Lünsmann	64	(West Germany) Andy Bovensiepen	Ralt RT31/710	Volkswagen	10
(West Germany) Gerd Lünsmann	69	(West Germany) Stefan Fricke	Ralt RT31/710	Volkswagen	8
(West Germany) Johann Stelzer	55	(West Germany) Johann Stelzer	Reynard 863/039	Volkswagen	2, 9, 11
(Austria) EMCO Sports Team	56	(Austria) Walter Zischg	Ralt RT30/614	Volkswagen	2, 5, 7, 9
(West Germany) Mönninghoff Racing — Sympathik Cosmetics	59	(West Germany) Logan Wilms	Ralt RT31/711	Volkswagen	7, 9
(West Germany) Mönninghoff Racing — Sympathik Cosmetics	59	(West Germany) Klaus Panchyrz	Ralt RT31/711	Volkswagen	10
(West Germany) Mönninghoff Racing — Sympathik Cosmetics	59	(West Germany) Andy Bovensiepen	Ralt RT31/711	Volkswagen	12
(West Germany) Richard Hamann	60	(West Germany) Richard Hamann	Reynard 873/051	Volkswagen	5, 7, 9, 11–12
(Austria) Team Theuermann	62	(Belgium) Phillip Verellen	Ralt RT31	Volkswagen	1
(Austria) Team Theuermann	62	(Austria) Martin Koller	Ralt RT31	Volkswagen	11
(West Germany) MSC Marktredwitz	64	(West Germany) Otmar Fassold	Ralt RT30/550	Volkswagen	3–5, 7, 11–12
(West Germany) MSC Scuderia Mitwitz	66	(West Germany) Justin Sünkel	Dallara 387/014	Volkswagen	1–5, 7, 9–12
(West Germany) Volkmar Löw	67	(West Germany) Volkmar Löw	Ralt RT30/530	Volkswagen	2–3, 7, 9, 12
(Belgium) Excelsior	67	(Belgium) Jacky Eeckelaert	JEC 386B/01	Volkswagen	4
(Switzerland) Formel Rennsport Club	72	(Switzerland) Jacques Isler	Dallara 388/015	Volkswagen	5

== Calendar ==
Round	Location	Circuit	Date	Supporting
1	Heusden-Zolder, Belgium	Circuit Zolder	3 April	XIX. AvD/MVBL "Bergischer Löwe"
2	Hockenheim, West Germany	Hockenheimring	24 April	AvD/MAC Sportwagen-Festival
3	Nürburg, West Germany	Nürburgring	1 May	50. ADAC Eifelrennen
4	Brno, Czechoslovakia	Masaryk Circuit	22 May	AvD/MHSTC "100 Meilen von Brünn"
5	Hockenheim, West Germany	Hockenheimring	29 May	ADAC-Preis Hockenheim
6	Mainz, West Germany	Mainz Finthen Airport	5 June	24. AvD/HMSC-Flugplatzrennen Mainz-Finthen
7	Nuremberg, West Germany	Norisring	26 June	ADAC-Norisring-Trophäe "200 Meilen von Nürnberg"
8	Wunstorf, West Germany	Wunstorf Air Base	17 July	ADAC-Flugplatzrennen Wunstorf
9	Salzburg, Austria	Salzburgring	28 August	ADAC-Alpentrophäe
10	Nürburg, West Germany	Nürburgring	4 September	1000 km of Nürburgring
11	Mogyoród, Hungary	Hungaroring	18 September	ADAC-Rundstrecken-Rennen Hungaroring
12	Hockenheim, West Germany	Hockenheimring	16 October	10. ADAC "Preis der Stadt Esslingen"

== Results ==
Round	Circuit	Pole position	Fastest lap	Winning driver	Winning team	B Class Winner
1	(Belgium) Circuit Zolder	(West Germany) Joachim Winkelhock	(West Germany) Otto Rensing	(West Germany) Joachim Winkelhock	(West Germany) WTS Liqui Moly Equipe	(Switzerland) Daniel Müller
2	(West Germany) Hockenheimring	(West Germany) Joachim Winkelhock	(West Germany) Joachim Winkelhock	(West Germany) Joachim Winkelhock	(West Germany) WTS Liqui Moly Equipe	(West Germany) Franz Engstler
3	(West Germany) Nürburgring	(West Germany) Joachim Winkelhock	(Switzerland) Hanspeter Kaufmann	(West Germany) Joachim Winkelhock	(West Germany) WTS Liqui Moly Equipe	(West Germany) Franz Engstler
4	(Czechoslovakia) Masaryk Circuit	(Switzerland) Hanspeter Kaufmann	(West Germany) Frank Biela	(West Germany) Wolfgang Kaufmann	(West Germany) Style Auto Racing Team	(Switzerland) Daniel Müller
5	(West Germany) Hockenheimring	(West Germany) Joachim Winkelhock	(Hungary) Csaba Kesjár	(West Germany) Otto Rensing	(West Germany) Volkswagen Motorsport	(Switzerland) Daniel Müller
6	(West Germany) Mainz Finthen Airport	(West Germany) Frank Biela	(West Germany) Otto Rensing	(West Germany) Frank Biela	(West Germany) Team Sonax Autopflege	(West Germany) Andreas Buhk
7	(West Germany) Norisring	(West Germany) Joachim Winkelhock	race cancelled due to fatal accident of Csaba Kesjár			
8	(West Germany) Wunstorf	(West Germany) Otto Rensing	(West Germany) Wolfgang Kaufmann	(West Germany) Joachim Winkelhock	(West Germany) WTS Liqui Moly Equipe	(West Germany) Andreas Buhk
9	(Austria) Salzburgring	(West Germany) Michael Bartels	(Switzerland) Franco Forini	(Switzerland) Hanspeter Kaufmann	(Switzerland) JSK Generalbau	(Switzerland) Daniel Müller
10	(West Germany) Nürburgring	(West Germany) Michael Roppes	(West Germany) Michael Bartels	(West Germany) Otto Rensing	(West Germany) Volkswagen Motorsport	(West Germany) Franz Engstler
11	(Hungary) Hungaroring	(West Germany) Frank Biela	(West Germany) Otto Rensing	(West Germany) Frank Biela	(West Germany) Team Sonax Autopflege	(West Germany) Frank Beyerlein
12	(West Germany) Hockenheimring	(West Germany) Michael Bartels	(West Germany) Wolfgang Kaufmann	(West Germany) Michael Bartels	(West Germany) Malte Bongers Motorsport	(West Germany) Andreas Buhk

== Championship standings ==
=== A-Class ===
- Points are awarded as follows:

1	2	3	4	5	6	7	8	9	10	11	12	13	14	15	16	17	18
20	18	16	15	14	13	12	11	10	9	8	7	6	5	4	3	2	1

Pos	Driver	ZOL (Belgium)	HOC1 (West Germany)	NÜR1 (West Germany)	BRN (Czechoslovakia)	HOC2 (West Germany)	MAI (West Germany)	NOR (West Germany)	WUN (West Germany)	SAL (Austria)	NÜR2 (West Germany)	HUN (Hungary)	HOC3 (West Germany)	Points
1	(West Germany) Joachim Winkelhock	**1**	**1**	**1**	3	**Ret**	2	**C**	1	5	2	2	Ret	164
2	(West Germany) Otto Rensing	2	2	Ret	4	1	3	C	**2**	3	1	3	Ret	157
3	(West Germany) Frank Biela	3	4	Ret	2	5	**1**	C	3	6	Ret	**1**	Ret	132
4	(West Germany) Frank Krämer	10	5	3	8	Ret	9	C	7	4	3	16	3	119
5	(West Germany) Michael Bartels	4	7	15	Ret	4	4	C	4	**Ret**	13	4	**1**	117
6	(Switzerland) Hanspeter Kaufmann	5	6	2	**Ret**	18	10	C	Ret	1	8	9	4	111
7	(West Germany) Wolfgang Kaufmann	8	8	Ret	1	8	Ret	C	5	2	Ret	Ret	2	103
8	(West Germany) Michael Roppes	Ret	3	8	Ret	6	14	C	9	Ret	**5**	5	DNS	83
9	(West Germany) Stefan Neuberger	Ret	Ret	9	7	3	17	C	11	Ret	6	Ret	5	75
10	(Switzerland) Daniel Müller	9	19	Ret	10	2	16	C	DNS	9	7	10	DNS	71
11	(Austria) Karl Wendlinger	Ret	Ret	6	6	11	15	C	Ret	16	4	6	Ret	69
12	(West Germany) Franz Engstler	DNS	15	12	Ret	7	13	C	Ret	11	12	7	7	68
13	(Switzerland) Franco Forini		14	5	Ret	15	5	C	6	7	Ret	Ret		62
14	(West Germany) Ellen Lohr	7	13	7	11		Ret	C	8	Ret	9			59
15	(West Germany) Andreas Buhk	Ret	Ret	13	DNS	19	12	C	14	8	11	11	6	58
16	(West Germany) Ralf Kelleners	15	9	4	14	Ret	Ret	C	10	Ret	20	8	Ret	54
17	(West Germany) Peter Zakowski	14	17	10	5	14	7	C	Ret					47
18	(Netherlands) Gerrit van Kouwen	6	12	DNS	Ret		6						9	43
19	(Hungary) Csaba Kesjár	DSQ	10	Ret	9	16	8	C						33
20	(Switzerland) Rene Wartmann	DNS	Ret		13	10	18	C		14	16	13	16	33
21	(West Germany) Josef Bertzen	DNS	16	11	12	Ret	11	C	13	DNS				32
22	(West Germany) Justin Sunkel	13	DNS	16	15	13		C		17	17	15	19	27
23	(West Germany) Richard Hamann					12		C		13		12	Ret	20
24	(West Germany) Andy Bovensiepen										10		10	18
25	(Austria) Franz Binder									10			13	17
26	(West Germany) Logan Wilms							C		15	14	14		14
27	(West Germany) Sigi Betz	11	20	14	Ret			C						13
28	(West Germany) Georg Arbinger												8	11
29	(Switzerland) Jacques Isler		18			9								11
30	(West Germany) Marc Hessel									12	Ret	17	Ret	9
31	(Switzerland) Jo Zeller		11											8
32	(Belgium) Phillip Verellen	12												7
33	(West Germany) Stefan Fricke								12					7
34	(Austria) Mercedes Stermitz												12	7
35	(Switzerland) Gianni Bianchi	DNS				Ret	Ret	C		Ret	18		13	7
36	(West Germany) Otmar Fassold			18	16	DNS		C				Ret	17	6
37	(Denmark) Svend Hansen												14	5
38	(Norway) Trond-Aage Krosby											15		5
39	(Austria) Herbert Prügl								15			20		4
40	(Switzerland) Franz Kaiser									20	19		15	4
41	(West Germany) Gernot Sirrenburg		DNS	17					Ret		Ret			2
42	(Hungary) András Kövesdán				17							19		2
43	(Austria) Walter Zischg		21			17		C		21				2
44	(West Germany) Johann Stelzer		DNQ							18		18		2
45	(Belgium) Jacky Eeckelaert				18									1
46	(West Germany) Volkmar Löw		DNQ	19				C		Ret			DNS	0
47	(Austria) Wolfgang Petutschnig									19				0
48	(Germany) Uwe Wolpert										20			0
49	(Germany) Klaus Panchyrz										21			0
50	(Argentina) Víctor Rosso									22	Ret			0
	(Austria) Martin Koller									Ret		Ret		0
	(France) Franck Fréon		Ret											0
	(Hungary) Kálmán Bódis											Ret		0
	(Sweden) Rickard Rydell							C						0
	(Germany) Gerd Lünsmann							C						0
	(Sweden) Peter Albertsson							C						0
	(Austria) Georg Neyer									DNQ				0
Pos	Driver	ZOL (Belgium)	HOC1 (West Germany)	NÜR1 (West Germany)	BRN (Czechoslovakia)	HOC2 (West Germany)	MAI (West Germany)	NOR (West Germany)	WUN (West Germany)	SAL (Austria)	NÜR2 (West Germany)	HUN (Hungary)	HOC3 (West Germany)	Points

Colour	Result
Gold	Winner
Silver	Second place
Bronze	Third place
Green	Points classification
Blue	Non-points classification
Blue	Non-classified finish (NC)
Purple	Retired, not classified (Ret)
Red	Did not qualify (DNQ)
Red	Did not pre-qualify (DNPQ)
Black	Disqualified (DSQ)
White	Did not start (DNS)
White	Withdrew (WD)
White	Race cancelled (C)
Blank	Did not practice (DNP)
Blank	Did not arrive (DNA)
Blank	Excluded (EX)

**Bold** – Pole
Italics – Fastest Lap
