= Jens Piesbergen =

Swiss curler and coach (born 1964)

- Curler ♂
- Born: 16 October 1964 (age 62)

Team
- Curling club: CC Winterthur, Winterthur

Curling career
- Member Association: Switzerland
- World Championship: 1 (1993)
- European Championship: 2 (1987, 1995)
- Other appearances: World Junior Championships: 1 (1985), World Senior Championships: 1 (2018)
Medal record
Curling
World Championships
Bronze medal – third place	1993 Geneva
European Championships
Silver medal – second place	1995 Grindelwald
Bronze medal – third place	1987 Oberstdorf
Swiss Men's Championship
Gold medal – first place	1993 Genève
World Junior Championships
Silver medal – second place	1985 Perth

Jens Piesbergen (born 16 October 1964) is a Swiss curler and curling coach.

He is a 1993 World Men's bronze medallist.

== Teams ==
=== Men's ===
Season	Skip	Third	Second	Lead	Alternate	Coach	Events
1984–85	Christian Saager	Jens Piesbergen	Urs Spiegel	Jörg Piesbergen			SJCC 1984 (gold); WJCC 1985 (silver)
1987–88	Dieter Wüest	Jens Piesbergen	Peter Grendelmeier	Simon Roth			ECC 1987 (bronze)
1992–93	Dieter Wüest	Jens Piesbergen	Peter Grendelmeier	Simon Roth	Martin Zürrer (WCC)		SMCC 1993 (gold); WCC 1993 (bronze)
1995–96	André Flotron	Jens Piesbergen	Peter Grendelmeier	Guido Tischhauser	Martin Stoll	Frédéric Jean	ECC 1995 (silver)
1996–97	André Flotron	Jens Piesbergen	Peter Grendelmeier	Guido Tischhauser			
2017–18	Dieter Wüest	Jens Piesbergen	Martin Zürrer	Marc Syfrig	Ernst Erb	Ernst Erb	WSCC 2018 (5th)
2018–19	Dieter Wüest	Jens Piesbergen	Martin Zürrer	Marc Syfrig			

=== Mixed ===
Season	Skip	Third	Second	Lead	Alternate	Events
2001–02	Dieter Wüest	Isabelle Wüest	Jens Piesbergen	Brigitte Fischer	Corinne Egloff	SMxCC 2002 (gold)

== Record as a coach of national teams ==
Year	Tournament, event	National team	Place
1999	1999 World Junior Curling Championships	Switzerland (junior men)	2nd place, silver medalist(s)
