= Daniel Model =

Swiss male curler and businessperson

- Curler ♂

Team
- Curling club: CC Kloten (Kloten)

Curling career
- Member Association: Switzerland
- World Championship: 2 (1988, 1990)
- European Championship: 1 (1991)
Medal record
Curling
European Championships
Gold medal – first place	1991 Chamonix
Swiss Men's Championship
Gold medal – first place	1988 Lausanne-Malley
Gold medal – first place	1990 Uzwil

Daniel Model (born 1960) is a Swiss curler and businessperson.

He is a 1991 European bronze medallist and a two-time Swiss men's champion (1988, 1990).

== Teams ==
Season	Skip	Third	Second	Lead	Alternate	Events
1987–88	Daniel Model	Beat Stephan	Michael Lips	Richard Mähr	Daniel Müller (WCC)	SMCC 1988 (gold); WCC 1988 (4th)
1989–90	Daniel Model	Beat Stephan	Marc Brügger	Lukas Fankhauser		SMCC 1990 (gold); WCC 1990 (6th)
1991–92	Daniel Model	Mario Flückiger	Michael Lips	Thomas Lips	Marc Brügger	ECC 1991 (bronze)
