= Martin Zürrer =

Swiss male curler and coach

- Curler ♂

Team
- Curling club: CC Dübendorf, Dübendorf

Curling career
- Member Association: Switzerland
- World Championship: 2 (1993, 1994)
- European Championship: 1 (1988)
- Other appearances: World Senior Championships: 1 (2018)
Medal record
Curling
World Championships
Bronze medal – third place	1993 Geneva
Bronze medal – third place	1994 Oberstdorf
European Championships
Bronze medal – third place	1988 Perth
Swiss Men's Championship
Bronze medal – third place	1987 Leukerbad

Martin Zürrer is a Swiss curler and curling coach.

He is a 1993 and 1994 World Men's bronze medallist.

== Teams ==
Season	Skip	Third	Second	Lead	Alternate	Coach	Events
1986–87	Peter Attinger Jr.	Werner Attinger	Martin Zürrer	Kurt Attinger			SMCC 1987 (bronze)
1988–89	Bernhard Attinger	Werner Attinger	Martin Zürrer	Marcel Senn			ECC 1988 (bronze)
1992–93	Dieter Wüest	Jens Piesbergen	Peter Grendelmeier	Simon Roth	Martin Zürrer		WCC 1993 (bronze)
1993–94	Markus Eggler	Dominic Andres	Stefan Hofer	Björn Schröder	Martin Zürrer		WCC 1994 (bronze)
2017–18	Yves Hess	Rainer Kobler	Michael Müller	Fabian Schmid	Kevin Wunderlin, Martin Zürrer	Martin Zürrer, Peter Studer	SMCC 2018 (bronze)
2017–18	Dieter Wüest	Jens Piesbergen	Martin Zürrer	Marc Syfrig	Ernst Erb	Ernst Erb	WSCC 2018 (5th)
2018–19	Dieter Wüest	Jens Piesbergen	Martin Zürrer	Marc Syfrig			

== Record as a coach of national teams ==
Year	Tournament, event	National team	Place
2009	2009 Winter Universiade	Switzerland (men)	5
