= Simon Roth =

Swiss curler

- Curler ♂

Team
- Curling club: CC Winterthur, Winterthur

Curling career
- Member Association: Switzerland
- World Championship: 1 (1993)
- European Championship: 1 (1987)
- Other appearances: World Senior Championships: 1 (2005)
Medal record
Curling
World Championships
Bronze medal – third place	1993 Geneva
European Championships
Bronze medal – third place	1987 Oberstdorf
Swiss Men's Championship
Gold medal – first place	1993 Genève
World Senior Championships
Bronze medal – third place	2005 Greenacres

Simon Roth is a Swiss curler.

He is a 1993 World Men's bronze medallist.

== Teams ==
=== Men's ===
Season	Skip	Third	Second	Lead	Alternate	Events
1987–88	Dieter Wüest	Jens Piesbergen	Peter Grendelmeier	Simon Roth		ECC 1987 (bronze)
1992–93	Dieter Wüest	Jens Piesbergen	Peter Grendelmeier	Simon Roth	Martin Zürrer (WCC)	SMCC 1993 (gold); WCC 1993 (bronze)
2004–05	Peter Attinger Jr.	Bernhard Attinger	Mattias Neuenschwander	Jürg Geiler	Simon Roth	WSCC 2005 (bronze)

=== Mixed ===
Season	Skip	Third	Second	Lead	Events
1984	Beat Stephan	Cristina Wirz	Simon Roth	Irène Bretscher	SMxCC 1984 (gold)
