= Mikael Ljungberg (curler) =

Swedish male curler (born 1961)

- Curler ♂
- Other names: Micke
- Born: 23 August 1961 (age 65)

Team
- Curling club: Frösö-Oden CK, Östersund, Östersunds CK, Östersund

Curling career
- Member Association: Sweden
- World Championship: 2 (1989, 1994)
Medal record
Curling
World Championships
Silver medal – second place	1994 Oberstdorf
Bronze medal – third place	1989 Milwaukee
World Senior Championships
Silver medal – second place	2018 Östersund

Mikael "Micke" Ljungberg (born 23 August 1961) is a Swedish curler.

He is a 1994 World men's silver medallist and a 1989 World men's bronze medallist.

In 2003 he was inducted into the Swedish Curling Hall of Fame.

== Teams ==
Season	Skip	Third	Second	Lead	Alternate	Coach	Events
1988–89	Thomas Norgren	Jan-Olov Nässén	Anders Lööf	Mikael Ljungberg	Peter Cederwall		WCC 1989 (bronze)
1993–94	Jan-Olov Nässén	Anders Lööf	Mikael Ljungberg	Leif Sätter	Örjan Jonsson		WCC 1994 (silver)
1997–98	Martin Mattsson	Anders Lööf	Leif Sätter	Mikael Ljungberg			
2002–03	Jan-Olov Nässén	Anders Lööf	Mikael Ljungberg	Leif Sätter			SSCC 2003 (gold)
2008–09	Jan-Olov Nässén	Anders Lööf	Mikael Ljungberg	Leif Sätter			
2012–13	Jan-Olov Nässén	Anders Lööf	Mikael Ljungberg	Leif Sätter			SSCC 2013 (5th)
2013–14	Jan-Olov Nässén	Anders Lööf	Mikael Ljungberg	Leif Sätter			SSCC 2014 (bronze)
2015–16	Tommy Olin	Mikael Ljungberg	Anders Lööf	Per Carlsén	Dan Carlsén		SSCC 2016 (bronze)
2017–18	Mats Wranå	Mikael Hasselborg	Anders Eriksson	Gerry Wahlin	Mikael Ljungberg	Mikael Ljungberg	WSCC 2018 (silver)
2018–19	Emil Markusson	Daniel Berggren	Fredrik Ljungberg	Mikael Ljungberg			SMCC 2019 (9th)
2019–20	Emil Markusson	Fredrik Ljungberg	Mikael Ljungberg	Jonatan Markusson			SMCC 2020 (15th)

== Personal life ==
His wife is Swedish curler Lena Mårdberg, she played on 1990 World women's championship.
