= Peter Grendelmeier =

Swiss curler (born 1967)

- Curler ♂
- Born: 27 April 1967 (age 59); Männedorf, Switzerland

Team
- Curling club: CC Winterthur, Winterthur

Curling career
- Member Association: Switzerland
- World Championship: 1 (1993)
- European Championship: 2 (1987, 1995)
Medal record
Curling
World Championships
Bronze medal – third place	1993 Geneva
European Championships
Silver medal – second place	1995 Grindelwald
Bronze medal – third place	1987 Oberstdorf
Swiss Men's Championship
Gold medal – first place	1993 Genève

Peter Andreas Grendelmeier (born 27 April 1967 in Männedorf, Switzerland) is a Swiss curler.

He is a 1993 World Men's bronze medallist.

== Teams ==
Season	Skip	Third	Second	Lead	Alternate	Coach	Events
1984–85	Peter Grendelmeier	Andreas Stübing	Dani Bugmann	Pascal Jeanneret			SJCC 1985 (gold)
1987–88	Dieter Wüest	Jens Piesbergen	Peter Grendelmeier	Simon Roth			ECC 1987 (bronze)
1992–93	Dieter Wüest	Jens Piesbergen	Peter Grendelmeier	Simon Roth	Martin Zürrer (WCC)		SMCC 1993 (gold); WCC 1993 (bronze)
1995–96	André Flotron	Jens Piesbergen	Peter Grendelmeier	Guido Tischhauser	Martin Stoll	Frédéric Jean	ECC 1995 (silver)
1996–97	André Flotron	Jens Piesbergen	Peter Grendelmeier	Guido Tischhauser			
