= Lukas Fankhauser =

Swiss male curler

- Curler ♂

Team
- Curling club: CC Kloten (Kloten)

Curling career
- Member Association: Switzerland
- World Championship: 1 (1990)
Medal record
Curling
Swiss Men's Championship
Gold medal – first place	1990 Uzwil

Lukas Fankhauser is a Swiss curler.

At the national level, he is a Swiss men's champion curler (1990).

== Teams ==
Season	Skip	Third	Second	Lead	Events
1989–90	Daniel Model	Beat Stephan	Marc Brügger	Lukas Fankhauser	SMCC 1990 (gold); WCC 1990 (6th)
1996–97	Lukas Fankhauser	Denise Alt	Daniel Luthi	Karin Oldani	
