= Haluptzok =

Haluptzok is a surname. It is a variant of the Polish surname Halupczok. Notable people with the surname include:

- Dan Haluptzok (born 1947), American curler, brother of Mark
- Mark Haluptzok (born 1951), American curler, brother of Dan
- Melissa Hortman (1970–2025), American politician, born Melissa Haluptzok
