= Anders Lööf =

Swedish male curler

- Curler ♂
- Other names: Lövet
- Born: 11 May 1961 (age 65)

Team
- Curling club: Frösö-Oden CK, Östersund, Östersunds CK, Östersund

Curling career
- Member Association: Sweden
- World Championship: 2 (1989, 1994)
Medal record
Curling
World Championships
Silver medal – second place	1994 Oberstdorf
Bronze medal – third place	1989 Milwaukee

Anders Birger "Lövet" Lööf (born 11 May 1961) is a Swedish curler.

He is a 1994 World men's silver medallist and a 1989 World men's bronze medallist.

In 2002 he was inducted into the Swedish Curling Hall of Fame.

== Teams ==
Season	Skip	Third	Second	Lead	Alternate	Events
1988–89	Thomas Norgren	Jan-Olov Nässén	Anders Lööf	Mikael Ljungberg	Peter Cederwall	WCC 1989 (bronze)
1993–94	Jan-Olov Nässén	Anders Lööf	Mikael Ljungberg	Leif Sätter	Örjan Jonsson	WCC 1994 (silver)
1997–98	Martin Mattsson	Anders Lööf	Leif Sätter	Mikael Ljungberg		
2001–02	Bosse Sjölund	Jan Wallin	Anders Lööf	Örjan Jonsson		
2002–03	Jan-Olov Nässén	Anders Lööf	Mikael Ljungberg	Leif Sätter		SSCC 2003 (gold)
2008–09	Jan-Olov Nässén	Anders Lööf	Mikael Ljungberg	Leif Sätter		
2012–13	Jan-Olov Nässén	Anders Lööf	Mikael Ljungberg	Leif Sätter		SSCC 2013 (5th)
2013–14	Jan-Olov Nässén	Anders Lööf	Mikael Ljungberg	Leif Sätter		SSCC 2014 (bronze)
2015–16	Tommy Olin	Mikael Ljungberg	Anders Lööf	Per Carlsén	Dan Carlsén	SSCC 2016 (bronze)

== Personal life ==
His sister is Annika Lööf, 1992 World women's curling champion.
