= 1987 European Curling Championships =

Curling tournament

- Host city: Oberstdorf, West Germany
- Arena: Eis-Bundesleistungs-Zentrum
- Dates: 8–12 December
- Men's winner: Sweden
- Curling club: Timrå CK, Timrå
- Skip: Thomas Norgren
- Third: Jan Strandlund
- Second: Lars Strandqvist
- Lead: Lars Engblom
- Alternate: Olle Håkansson
- Finalist: Norway (Eigil Ramsfjell)
- Women's winner: West Germany
- Curling club: SC Riessersee, Garmisch-Partenkirchen
- Skip: Andrea Schöpp
- Third: Almut Hege
- Second: Monika Wagner
- Lead: Suzanne Fink
- Finalist: Sweden (Anette Norberg)

The 1987 European Curling Championships were held from 8 to 12 December at the Eis-Bundesleistungs-Zentrum arena in Oberstdorf, West Germany.

The Swedish men's team skipped by Thomas Norgren won their second title and the West German women's team skipped by Andrea Schöpp won their third title.

== Men ==
=== Teams ===
Country	Skip	Third	Second	Lead	Alternate	Coach	Curling club, city
Austria	Alois Kreidl	Günther Mochny	Dieter Küchenmeister	Stefan Salinger			Kitzbühel CC, Kitzbühel
Denmark	Sören Bang	Henrik Jakobsen	Lasse Lavrsen	Ulrik Schmidt	Michael Harry		Hvidovre CC, Hvidovre
England	John Deakin	Gordon Vickers	Martyn Deakin	Peter Bowyer			
Finland	Jussi Uusipaavalniemi	Jarmo Jokivalli	Jari Laukkanen	Petri Tsutsunen	Juhani Heinonen		
France	Christophe Boan	Gerard Ravello	Alain Brangi	Thierry Mercier			
Italy	Fabio Alverà	Adriano Lorenzi	Stefano Morona	Stefano Zardini			
Luxembourg	Denis Boulianne	Nico Schweich	Norbert Busch	William Bannerman			
Netherlands	Wim Neeleman	Otto Veening	Sytze van Dam	Cock Sonneveld			
Norway	Eigil Ramsfjell	Sjur Loen	Morten Søgaard	Bo Bakke			
Scotland	Douglas Dryburgh	Philip Wilson	Lindsay Clark	Billy Andrew			
Sweden	Thomas Norgren	Jan Strandlund	Lars Strandqvist	Lars Engblom	Olle Håkansson	Olle Håkansson	Timrå CK, Timrå
Switzerland	Dieter Wüest	Jens Piesbergen	Peter Grendelmeier	Simon Roth			
Wales	John Hunt	John Stone	John Guyan	Michael Hunt			
West Germany	Keith Wendorf	Uwe Saile	Sven Saile	Hans Dieter Kiesel			CC Schwenningen, Schwenningen

=== First Phase (Triple Knockout) ===
==== Round 1 ====
Two teams promoted to Second Phase

Game 1		Game 2		Game 3
		Switzerland	10
France	2	Austria	3
Austria	11			Switzerland	5
Italy	8			Scotland	6
Netherlands	2	Italy	1
Scotland	12	Scotland	3
Wales	4

Game 1		Game 2		Game 3
		Sweden	8
Denmark	7	England	5
England	8			Sweden	6
Norway	12			Norway	4
Luxembourg	4	Norway	6
West Germany	7	West Germany	4
Finland	0

==== Round 2 ====
Three teams promoted to Second Phase

Game 1		Game 2		Game 3
				Switzerland	9
				Denmark	2
		Denmark	8
Luxembourg	3	Finland	2
Finland	8

Game 1		Game 2		Game 3
				Norway	5
				Netherlands	4
		France	2
Netherlands	8	Netherlands	7
Wales	2

Game 1		Game 2
Austria	6
Italy	7	Italy	5
England	7	West Germany	7
West Germany	8

==== Round 3 ====
Three teams promoted to Second Phase

Game 1		Game 2
		Denmark	7
England	3	Wales	1
Wales	8

Game 1		Game 2
		Italy	3
France	4	Finland	6
Finland	5

Game 1		Game 2
		Netherlands	7
Austria	8	Austria	6
Luxembourg	7

=== Second Phase (Double Knockout) ===
==== Round 1 ====
Two teams promoted to Playoffs

Game 1
Scotland	8
Finland	3
Switzerland	6
Norway	7

Game 2
Scotland	5
Norway	6

Game 1
Sweden	6
Denmark	7
West Germany	6
Netherlands	3

Game 2
Denmark	5
West Germany	6

==== Round 2 ====
Two teams promoted to Playoffs

Game 1		Game 2
		Denmark	3
Finland	2	Switzerland	4
Switzerland	7

Game 1		Game 2
		Scotland	3
Sweden	8	Sweden	4
Netherlands	1

=== Placement Phase ===
==== Range 9-14 ====
Quarterfinals (9-14)
Wales	8
Luxembourg	7
England	5
France	7

Semifinals (9-14)
Italy	7
Wales	2
Austria	4
France	3

Final

Semifinals (11-14)
England	6
Wales	4
France	8
Luxembourg	2

Final for 11th place
England	5
France	2
Match for 13th place
Wales	7
Luxembourg	5

==== Range 5-8 ====
Final for 5th place
Denmark	6
Scotland	5

Final for 7th place
Finland	7
Netherlands	4

=== Playoffs ===
Semifinals
1	Sweden	9
4	West Germany	2
2	Switzerland	3
3	Norway	8

Final
Sweden	5
Norway	4
Bronze Medal Game
West Germany	4
Switzerland	5

=== Final standings ===
Place	Country	Skip	Games	Wins	Losses
1st place, gold medalist(s)	Sweden	Thomas Norgren	6	5	1
2nd place, silver medalist(s)	Norway	Eigil Ramsfjell	8	6	2
3rd place, bronze medalist(s)	Switzerland	Dieter Wüest	8	5	3
4	West Germany	Keith Wendorf	8	5	3
5	Denmark	Sören Bang	8	4	4
6	Scotland	Douglas Dryburgh	6	4	2
7	Finland	Jussi Uusipaavalniemi	9	5	4
8	Netherlands	Wim Neeleman	9	3	6
9	Austria	Alois Kreidl	7	4	3
10	Italy	Fabio Alverà	7	3	4
11	England	John Deakin	7	3	4
12	France	Christophe Boan	7	2	5
13	Wales	John Hunt	8	3	5
14	Luxembourg	Denis Boulianne	6	0	6

== Women ==
=== Teams ===
Country	Skip	Third	Second	Lead	Coach	Curling club, city
Austria	Lilly Hummelt	Andrea von Malberg	Inge Lamprecht	Jutta Kober		
Denmark	Marianne Qvist	Lene Bidstrup	Astrid Birnbaum	Lilian Frøhling		Hvidovre CC, Hvidovre
England	Caroline Cumming	Aileen Gemmell	Penni Hinds	Alison Arthur	Robin Gemmell	
Finland	Anne Eerikäinen	Mari Lundén	Tytti Haapasaari	Terhi Liukkonen		
France	Agnes Mercier	Annick Mercier	Andrée Dupont-Roc	Catherine Lefebvre		
Italy	Ann Lacedelli	Francesca Del Fabbro	Emanuela Sarto	Loredana Siorpaes		
Netherlands	Laura Van Imhoff	Gerrie Veening	Kniertje van Kuyk	Mirjam Gast		
Norway	Trine Trulsen	Dordi Nordby	Hanne Pettersen	Mette Halvorsen		Snarøyen CC, Oslo
Scotland	Marion Miller	Janice Miller	Jane McConnell	Moira McConnell		Greenacres CC, Renfrewshire
Sweden	Anette Norberg	Sofie Marmont	Anna Rindeskog	Louise Marmont		Härnösands CK, Härnösand
Switzerland	Cristina Lestander	Barbara Meier	Christina Gartenmann	Katrin Peterhans		
Wales	Helen Lyon	Jean Robinson	Anna Martin	Jackie Jones		
West Germany	Andrea Schöpp	Almut Hege	Monika Wagner	Suzanne Fink		SC Riessersee, Garmisch-Partenkirchen

=== First Phase (Triple Knockout) ===
==== Round 1 ====
Two teams promoted to Second Phase

Game 1		Game 2		Game 3
		West Germany	6
Netherlands	1	Norway	7
Norway	14			Norway	10
Scotland	13			Scotland	2
Wales	2	Scotland	14
France	5	Austria	1
Austria	6

Game 1
Sweden	11
Finland	4
Italy	7
England	6

Game 2
Austria	4
Sweden	5
Denmark	11
Italy	3

Game 3
Sweden	10
Denmark	2

==== Round 2 ====
Three teams promoted to Second Phase

Game 1		Game 2		Game 3
				Denmark	7
				France	10
		Netherlands	5
Wales	1	France	6
France	13

Game 1		Game 2
West Germany	9
Austria	1	West Germany	5
Switzerland	6	Switzerland	6
Italy	1

Game 1		Game 2
		Scotland	9
Finland	13	Finland	3
England	1

==== Round 3 ====
Three teams promoted to Second Phase

Game 1		Game 2
		Finland	8
Italy	5	Wales	1
Wales	9

Game 1		Game 2
		West Germany	12
Netherlands	1	England	5
England	7

Game 1
Denmark	6
Austria	9

=== Second Phase (Double Knockout) ===
==== Round 1 ====
Two teams promoted to Playoffs

Game 1
Norway	4
West Germany	7
Scotland	6
France	7

Game 2
West Germany	12
France	4

Game 1
Sweden	12
Finland	2
Switzerland	9
Austria	2

Game 2
Sweden	7
Switzerland	5

==== Round 2 ====
Two teams promoted to Playoffs

Game 1		Game 2
		Switzerland	5
Norway	8	Norway	9
Scotland	4

Game 1		Game 2
		France	8
Finland	6	Finland	2
Austria	5

=== Placement Phase ===
==== Range 9-13 ====
Quarterfinal (9-13)
Italy	9
Netherlands	5

Semifinals (9-13)
Wales	1
England	10
Denmark	10
Italy	5

Final

Semifinal (11-13)		Final for 11th place
Wales	2
Netherlands	10	Netherlands	10
		Italy	4

==== Range 5-8 ====
Final for 5th place
Switzerland	8
Finland	4

Final for 7th place
Scotland	3
Austria	6

=== Playoffs ===
Semifinals
1	France	3
4	Sweden	8
2	Norway	6
3	West Germany	7

Final
Sweden	6
West Germany	7
Bronze Medal Game
France	4
Norway	9

=== Final standings ===
Place	Country	Skip	Games	Wins	Losses
1st place, gold medalist(s)	West Germany	Andrea Schöpp	8	6	2
2nd place, silver medalist(s)	Sweden	Anette Norberg	7	6	1
3rd place, bronze medalist(s)	Norway	Trine Trulsen	8	6	2
4	France	Agnes Mercier	9	5	4
5	Switzerland	Cristina Lestander	7	4	3
6	Finland	Anne Eerikäinen	8	3	5
7	Austria	Lilly Hummelt	7	3	4
8	Scotland	Marion Miller	7	3	4
9	Denmark	Marianne Qvist	6	3	3
10	England	Caroline Cumming	6	2	4
11	Netherlands	Laura Van Imhoff	6	2	4
12	Italy	Ann Lacedelli	7	2	5
13	Wales	Helen Lyon	6	1	5
