= 1994 World Men's Curling Championship =

- Host city: Oberstdorf, Germany
- Arena: Eisstadion
- Dates: April 10–17, 1994
- Winner: Canada
- Curling club: Kelowna CC, British Columbia
- Skip: Rick Folk
- Third: Pat Ryan
- Second: Bert Gretzinger
- Lead: Gerry Richard
- Alternate: Rob Steinhauer
- Finalist: Sweden (Jan-Olov Nässén)

The 1994 World Men's Curling Championships was held at the Eisstadion in Oberstdorf, Germany from April 10–17, 1994.

== Teams ==
Australia	Canada	Denmark	Germany	Netherlands
New South Wales CC, Victoria Skip: Hugh Millikin; Third: Tom Kidd; Second: Gerald Chick; Lead: Stephen Hewitt; Alternate: Brian Johnson	Kelowna CC, Kelowna, British Columbia Skip: Rick Folk; Third: Pat Ryan; Second: Bert Gretzinger; Lead: Gerry Richard; Alternate: Ron Steinhauer	Hvidovre CC, Hvidovre Skip: Gert Larsen; Third: Oluf Olsen; Second: Michael Harry; Lead: Henrik Jakobsen; Alternate: Tommy Stjerne	Füssen CC, Füssen Skip: Andy Kapp; Third: Uli Kapp; Second: Oliver Axnick; Lead: Michael Schäffer; Alternate: Holger Höhne	Prins Willem-Alexander CC, The Hague Skip: Wim Neeleman; Third: Floris van Imhoff; Second: Rob Vilain; Lead: Jeroen van Dillewijn; Alternate: Gustaf van Imhoff
Norway	Scotland	Sweden	Switzerland	United States
Risenga CK, Oslo Skip: Tormod Andreassen; Third: Stig-Arne Gunnestad; Second: Flemming Davanger; Lead: Kjell Berg; Alternate: Terje Lyshaug	Carrington CC, Edinburgh Skip: Colin Hamilton; Third: Robert Kelly; Second: Vic Moran; Lead: Colin Barr; Alternate: Trevor Dodds	Östersunds CK, Östersund Skip: Jan-Olov Nässén; Third: Anders Lööf; Second: Mikael Ljungberg; Lead: Leif Sätter; Alternate: Örjan Jonsson	Biel-Touring CC, Biel Skip: Markus Eggler; Third: Dominic Andres; Second: Stefan Hofer; Lead: Björn Schröder; Alternate: Martin Zürrer	Bemidji CC, Bemidji, Minnesota Skip: Scott Baird; Third: Pete Fenson; Second: Mark Haluptzok; Lead: Tim Johnson; Alternate: Dan Haluptzok

== Round-robin standings ==
Key
Teams to playoffs
Teams to tiebreakers

Country	Skip	W	L
Switzerland	Markus Eggler	8	1
Canada	Rick Folk	8	1
United States	Scott Baird	5	4
Germany	Andy Kapp	5	4
Sweden	Jan-Olov Nässén	5	4
Norway	Tormod Andreassen	4	5
Denmark	Gert Larsen	3	6
Netherlands	Wim Neeleman	3	6
Scotland	Colin Hamilton	3	6
Australia	Hugh Millikin	1	8

== Round-robin results ==
=== Draw 1 ===
Sheet A	Final
Sweden (Nässén)	3
Germany (Kapp)	8

Sheet B	Final
Scotland (Hamilton)	6
Denmark (Larsen)	10

Sheet C	Final
Switzerland (Eggler)	6
Canada (Folk)	4

Sheet D	Final
Norway (Andreassen)	3
United States (Baird)	5

Sheet E	Final
Netherlands (Neeleman)	7
Australia (Millikin)	4

=== Draw 2 ===
Sheet A	Final
United States (Baird)	5
Denmark (Larsen)	7

Sheet B	Final
Australia (Millikin)	4
Switzerland (Eggler)	7

Sheet C	Final
Sweden (Nässén)	10
Scotland (Hamilton)	4

Sheet D	Final
Canada (Folk)	7
Netherlands (Neeleman)	3

Sheet E	Final
Germany (Kapp)	10
Norway (Andreassen)	8

=== Draw 3 ===
Sheet A	Final
Sweden (Nässén)	8
Switzerland (Eggler)	7

Sheet B	Final
Norway (Andreassen)	6
Canada (Folk)	10

Sheet C	Final
Netherlands (Neeleman)	9
Denmark (Larsen)	8

Sheet D	Final
Germany (Kapp)	10
Australia (Millikin)	9

Sheet E	Final
United States (Baird)	7
Scotland (Hamilton)	4

=== Draw 4 ===
Sheet A	Final
Germany (Kapp)	4
Scotland (Hamilton)	8

Sheet B	Final
Netherlands (Neeleman)	2
Sweden (Nässén)	9

Sheet C	Final
United States (Baird)	11
Australia (Millikin)	6

Sheet D	Final
Denmark (Larsen)	2
Canada (Folk)	9

Sheet E	Final
Norway (Andreassen)	5
Switzerland (Eggler)	9

=== Draw 5 ===
Sheet A	Final
Canada (Folk)	8
Australia (Millikin)	6

Sheet B	Final
Norway (Andreassen)	11
Scotland (Hamilton)	5

Sheet C	Final
Netherlands (Neeleman)	4
Switzerland (Eggler)	9

Sheet D	Final
United States (Baird)	5
Sweden (Nässén)	3

Sheet E	Final
Denmark (Larsen)	4
Germany (Kapp)	6

=== Draw 6 ===
Sheet A	Final
United States (Baird)	4
Netherlands (Neeleman)	6

Sheet B	Final
Australia (Millikin)	8
Denmark (Larsen)	4

Sheet C	Final
Sweden (Nässén)	6
Norway (Andreassen)	5

Sheet D	Final
Switzerland (Eggler)	5
Germany (Kapp)	3

Sheet E	Final
Scotland (Hamilton)	6
Canada (Folk)	9

=== Draw 7 ===
Sheet A	Final
Norway (Andreassen)	6
Denmark (Larsen)	4

Sheet B	Final
United States (Baird)	3
Switzerland (Eggler)	6

Sheet C	Final
Germany (Kapp)	9
Canada (Folk)	10

Sheet D	Final
Scotland (Hamilton)	9
Netherlands (Neeleman)	4

Sheet E	Final
Sweden (Nässén)	8
Australia (Millikin)	4

=== Draw 8 ===
Sheet A	Final
Scotland (Hamilton)	4
Switzerland (Eggler)	5

Sheet B	Final
Germany (Kapp)	10
Netherlands (Neeleman)	0

Sheet C	Final
Australia (Millikin)	4
Norway (Andreassen)	10

Sheet D	Final
Sweden (Nässén)	4
Denmark (Larsen)	5

Sheet E	Final
United States (Baird)	2
Canada (Folk)	3

=== Draw 9 ===
Sheet A	Final
Netherlands (Neeleman)	5
Norway (Andreassen)	6

Sheet B	Final
Canada (Folk)	4
Sweden (Nässén)	3

Sheet C	Final
United States (Baird)	8
Germany (Kapp)	7

Sheet D	Final
Australia (Millikin)	8
Scotland (Hamilton)	9

Sheet E	Final
Denmark (Larsen)	5
Switzerland (Eggler)	9

== Tiebreakers ==
Sheet A	Final
United States (Baird)	4
Germany (Kapp)	9

Sheet B	Final
Sweden (Nässén)	6
United States (Baird)	4

== Playoffs ==
Semi-final
1	Switzerland	4
4	Sweden	6
2	Canada	6
3	Germany	5

Final
4	Sweden	2
2	Canada	3

=== Final ===
Sheet A	1	2	3	4	5	6	7	8	9	10	Final
Canada (Folk)	1	0	0	0	0	0	1	0	0	1	3
Sweden (Nässén)	0	0	1	0	0	0	0	0	1	0	2

1994 WCF Championship
(Canada)
Canada
22nd title
