= Peter Cederwall =

Swedish curler (born 1954)

- Curler ♂
- Born: 26 June 1954 (age 72)

Team
- Curling club: Frösö-Oden CK, Östersund

Curling career
- Member Association: Sweden
- World Championship: 1 (1989)
Medal record
Curling
World Championships
Bronze medal – third place	1989 Milwaukee

Bengt Peter Cederwall (born 26 June 1954) is a Swedish curler.

He is a 1989 World men's bronze medallist.

== Teams ==
Season	Skip	Third	Second	Lead	Alternate	Events
1988–89	Thomas Norgren	Jan-Olov Nässén	Anders Lööf	Mikael Ljungberg	Peter Cederwall	WCC 1989 (bronze)

== Personal life ==
His father is Swedish curler Bengt Cederwall, he played for Sweden on 1976 World men's championship.
