= 1987 German Formula Three Championship =

Seasons
- ← 1986 1988 →

The 1987 German Formula Three Championship (German: 1987 Deutsche Formel-3-Meisterschaft) was a multi-event motor racing championship for single-seat open wheel formula racing cars held in Germany, Belgium and Austria. The championship featured drivers competing in two-litre Formula Three racing cars which conformed to the technical regulations, or formula, for the championship. It commenced on 26 April at Nürburgring and ended at Zolder on 27 September after nine rounds.

Team Sonax Autopflege (Schübel Rennsport) driver Bernd Schneider dominated the championship. He won seven from eight races that he competed and clinched the title. Joachim Winkelhock lost 42 points to Schneider and finished as runner-up with win in the season finale at Zolder. Hanspeter Kaufmann won at AVUS. Víctor Rosso, Harald Huysman, Frank Biela, David Coyne, Tomi Luhtanen and Eric van de Poele were the other podium finishers.

== Teams and drivers ==
Entry List
Team	No.	Driver	Chassis	Engine	Rounds
(West Germany) Volkswagen Motorsport	1	(Argentina) Víctor Rosso	Ralt RT31/705	Volkswagen	All
(West Germany) Volkswagen Motorsport	2	(West Germany) Peter Zakowski	Ralt RT31/707	Volkswagen	All
(Switzerland) JSK Generalbau	3	(Switzerland) Hanspeter Kaufmann	Dallara F386	Volkswagen	All
(Switzerland) JSK Generalbau	23	(Switzerland) Gianni Bianchi	Dallara F386/019	Volkswagen	4
(West Germany) Team Sonax Autopflege	4	(West Germany) Bernd Schneider	Dallara F387	Volkswagen	1–8
(West Germany) Schübel Rennsport Int.	5	(Hungary) Csaba Kesjár	Dallara F387/014	Volkswagen	1–8
(West Germany) Frank Biela	6	(West Germany) Frank Biela	Reynard 873	Volkswagen	All
(West Germany) Malte Bongers Motorsport	7	(West Germany) Wolfgang Kaufmann	Reynard 873/061	Alfa Romeo	1–5
(West Germany) Malte Bongers Motorsport	8	(Finland) Tomi Luhtanen	Reynard 873/094	Volkswagen	All
(West Germany) Nigrin Sportauto Nachwuchsförderung	9	(West Germany) Otto Rensing	Martini MK52/01	Volkswagen	All
(West Germany) Nigrin Sportauto Nachwuchsförderung	10	(West Germany) Markus Oestreich	Martini MK52	Volkswagen	4, 6–8
(West Germany) McGregor Racing Team	11	(West Germany) Sigi Betz	Reynard 863/030	Volkswagen	5-10
(West Germany) McGregor Racing Team	12	(West Germany) Martin Ludwig	Ralt RT30	Volkswagen	1
(West Germany) Mönninghoff Racing	14	(West Germany) Frank Schmickler	Ralt RT31/711	Volkswagen	1–2, 4–8
(West Germany) Mönninghoff Racing	32	(Austria) Mercedes Stermitz	Ralt RT30	Volkswagen	4
(West Germany) Mönninghoff Racing	32	(West Germany) Delia Stegemann	Ralt RT31	Volkswagen	8
(West Germany) Bross Druck Chemie Racing	15	(United Kingdom) David Coyne	Reynard 873	Volkswagen	1–4, 6–8
(West Germany) Bross Druck Chemie Racing	35	(West Germany) Werner Braun	Reynard 863	Volkswagen	2
(West Germany) Bross Druck Chemie Racing	35	(West Germany) Helmut Bross	Reynard 863	Volkswagen	3
(West Germany) Bross Druck Chemie Racing	35	(Austria) Franz Binder	Reynard 863	Volkswagen	7
(West Germany) Bross Druck Chemie Racing	43	(West Germany) Werner Braun	Reynard 863	Volkswagen	1
(West Germany) Bross Druck Chemie Racing	51	(Austria) Franz Binder	Reynard 863	Volkswagen	5
(West Germany) Team Penthouse Pernod	16	(West Germany) Michael Roppes	Ralt RT31/701	Volkswagen	1–8
(West Germany) Peter Wisskirchen	17	(West Germany) Peter Wisskirchen	Reynard 873/045	Volkswagen	1–4, 6–8
(West Germany) Hartge Motorsport	19	(Belgium) Eric van de Poele	Ralt RT31	Volkswagen	1–4, 7–9
(West Germany) WTS Racing Team	20	(West Germany) Wilhelm F. Weber	Reynard 873	Volkswagen	1–4, 6–7
(West Germany) WTS Racing Team	20	(West Germany) Ellen Lohr	Reynard 873	Volkswagen	8
(West Germany) WTS Racing Team	20	(West Germany) Frank Schmickler	Reynard 873	Volkswagen	9
(West Germany) WTS Racing Team	21	(West Germany) Joachim Winkelhock	Reynard 873	Volkswagen	All
(West Germany) WTS Racing Team	22	(Canada) Patrick Jerome	Ralt RT30/522	Volkswagen	1–3
(West Germany) Stefan Fricke	25	(West Germany) Stefan Fricke	Ralt RT30/529	Volkswagen	1–3
(West Germany) Gerd Lünsmann Racing	27	(West Germany) Gerd Lünsmann	Ralt RT31/710	Volkswagen	2–4, 6–7
(West Germany) Gerd Lünsmann Racing	27	(West Germany) Stefan Fricke	Ralt RT31/710	Volkswagen	8–9
(Italy) Gipimo Corse	30	(Norway) Harald Huysman	Dallara F387	Alfa Romeo	All
(West Germany) Bamo Power Motorsport	33	(West Germany) Richard Hamann	Reynard 873/051	Volkswagen	1–7
(West Germany) Bamo Power Motorsport	39	(West Germany) Stefan Lohr	Reynard 853	Volkswagen	4
(West Germany) Derichs Rennwagen	34	(West Germany) Gerhard Müller	Derichs D385/01	Toyota	2
(West Germany) MC Motorsport	34	(France) Cathy Muller	Ralt RT31	Volkswagen	8
(Belgium) Sport Auto Racing	39	(Belgium) André Malherbe	Ralt RT31	Volkswagen	7
(West Germany) Ewald Gasper	40	(West Germany) Stefan Neuberger	Martini MK45	Volkswagen	1–2, 4
(France) Serge Saulnier	41	(France) Eric Bellefroid	Dallara F387	Alfa Romeo	7
(West Germany) Theo Kirchhoff	42	(West Germany) Theo Kirchhoff	Reynard	no data	1, 3
(Belgium) KTR	43	(Switzerland) Jean-Denis Délétraz	Ralt RT31	Volkswagen	7
(West Germany) Johann Stelzer	54	(West Germany) Johann Stelzer	Reynard 863	Volkswagen	1, 5

== Calendar ==
Round	Location	Circuit	Date	Supporting
1	Nürburg, West Germany	Nürburgring	26 April	49. ADAC Eifelrennen"
2	Berlin, West Germany	AVUS	10 May	ADAC-Avus-Rennen
3	Heusden-Zolder, Belgium	Circuit Zolder	24 May	21. ADAC Westfalen-Pokal-Rennen
4	Hockenheim, West Germany	Hockenheimring	5 July	ADAC-Preis Hockenheim
5	Zeltweg, Austria	Österreichring	12 July	ADAC-Hessen-Cup — Preis des Aichfeldes
6	Siegerland, West Germany	Siegerland Airport	23 August	10. ADAC-Siegerland-Flughafenrennen
7	Nürburg, West Germany	Nürburgring	30 August	ADAC 1000 km Rennen
8	Nürburg, West Germany	Nürburgring	20 September	XIV. ADAC Bilstein Super Sprint
9	Heusden-Zolder, Belgium	Circuit Zolder	27 September	ADAC/ACR Grenzland-Preis "Stefan-Bellof-Gedächtnis-Rennen"

== Results ==
Round	Circuit	Pole position	Fastest lap	Winning driver	Winning team
1	(West Germany) Nürburgring	(West Germany) Bernd Schneider	(West Germany) Bernd Schneider	(West Germany) Bernd Schneider	(West Germany) Team Sonax Autopflege
2	(West Germany) AVUS	(West Germany) Bernd Schneider	(West Germany) Bernd Schneider	(Switzerland) Hanspeter Kaufmann	(Switzerland) JSK Generalbau
3	(Belgium) Circuit Zolder	(West Germany) Bernd Schneider	(West Germany) Bernd Schneider	(West Germany) Bernd Schneider	(West Germany) Team Sonax Autopflege
4	(West Germany) Hockenheimring	(West Germany) Bernd Schneider	(West Germany) Bernd Schneider	(West Germany) Bernd Schneider	(West Germany) Team Sonax Autopflege
5	(Austria) Österreichring	(West Germany) Bernd Schneider	(West Germany) Bernd Schneider	(West Germany) Bernd Schneider	(West Germany) Team Sonax Autopflege
6	(West Germany) Siegerland Airport	(West Germany) Bernd Schneider	(West Germany) Bernd Schneider	(West Germany) Bernd Schneider	(West Germany) Team Sonax Autopflege
7	(West Germany) Nürburgring	(West Germany) Joachim Winkelhock	(West Germany) Bernd Schneider	(West Germany) Bernd Schneider	(West Germany) Team Sonax Autopflege
8	(West Germany) Nürburgring	(West Germany) Bernd Schneider	(West Germany) Bernd Schneider	(West Germany) Bernd Schneider	(West Germany) Team Sonax Autopflege
9	(Belgium) Circuit Zolder	(West Germany) Joachim Winkelhock	(Finland) Tomi Luhtanen	(West Germany) Joachim Winkelhock	(West Germany) WTS Racing Team

== Championship standings ==
- Points are awarded as follows:

1	2	3	4	5	6	7	8	9	10
20	15	12	10	8	6	4	3	2	1

Pos	Driver	NÜR1 (West Germany)	AVU (West Germany)	ZOL1 (Belgium)	HOC1 (West Germany)	ZEL (Austria)	SIE (West Germany)	NÜR2 (West Germany)	NÜR3 (West Germany)	ZOL2 (Belgium)	Points
1	(West Germany) Bernd Schneider	**1**	**13**	**1**	**1**	**1**	**1**	1	**1**		140
2	(West Germany) Joachim Winkelhock	9	10	2	2		2	**2**	2	**1**	98
3	(Switzerland) Hanspeter Kaufmann	3	1	3	Ret	2	7	Ret	4	7	77
4	(Argentina) Víctor Rosso	4	2	Ret	Ret	3	8	3	5	Ret	60
5	(West Germany) Otto Rensing	6	5	5	4	5	Ret	9	15	4	52
6	(Norway) Harald Huysman	16	3	4	3	7	5	10	Ret	Ret	47
7	(West Germany) Frank Biela	2	14	9	Ret	9	6	6	16	2	46
8	(West Germany) Peter Zakowski	8	4	Ret	5	13	4	Ret	7	6	41
9	(United Kingdom) David Coyne	5	Ret	Ret	Ret		3	4	8		33
10	(Finland) Tomi Luhtanen	10	6	6	15	14	Ret	Ret	3	5	33
11	(Belgium) Eric van de Poele	12	DNS	8	6			5	14	3	29
12	(West Germany) Michael Roppes	7	Ret	13	Ret	6	Ret	7	12		14
13	(West Germany) Wolfgang Kaufmann	13	9	7	7	8					13
14	(Hungary) Csaba Kesjár	11	12	14	11	4	10	12	10		12
15	(West Germany) Frank Schmickler	14	Ret		8	12	11	Ret	9	8	8
16	(France) Cathy Muller								6		6
17	(West Germany) Markus Oestreich				Ret		9	8	Ret		5
18	(West Germany) Peter Wisskirchen	18	7	16	12		12	14	DNS		4
19	(West Germany) Gerhard Müller		8								3
20	(West Germany) Sigi Betz	17	11	12	9	15					2
21	(West Germany) Richard Hamann	15	Ret	10	10	11	Ret	13			2
22	(Austria) Franz Binder					10		Ret			1
	(France) Eric Bellefroid							11			0
	(West Germany) Ellen Lohr								11		0
	(Switzerland) Gianni Bianchi				13						0
	(West Germany) Gerd Lünsmann		16	Ret	14		13	DNS			0
	(West Germany) Stefan Fricke	Ret	17	17					13	Ret	0
	(West Germany) Wilhelm F. Weber	20	15	15	Ret		DNS	DNS			0
	(Belgium) André Malherbe							15			0
	(West Germany) Johann Stelzer	Ret				16					0
	(Austria) Mercedes Stermitz				16						0
	(West Germany) Werner Braun	Ret	Ret		17						0
	(West Germany) Delia Stegemann								17		0
	(West Germany) Stefan Lohr				18						0
	(Canada) Patrick Jerome	19	DNS	Ret							0
	(West Germany) Martin Ludwig	21									0
	(West Germany) Theo Kirchhoff	22		Ret							0
	(West Germany) Stefan Neuberger		Ret		DNS						0
	(West Germany) Helmut Bross			Ret							0
	(Switzerland) Jean-Denis Délétraz							Ret			0
	(Austria) Walter Zischg				DNS						0
Pos	Driver	NÜR1 (West Germany)	AVU (West Germany)	ZOL1 (Belgium)	HOC1 (West Germany)	ZEL (Austria)	SIE (West Germany)	NÜR2 (West Germany)	NÜR3 (West Germany)	ZOL2 (Belgium)	Points

Colour	Result
Gold	Winner
Silver	Second place
Bronze	Third place
Green	Points classification
Blue	Non-points classification
Blue	Non-classified finish (NC)
Purple	Retired, not classified (Ret)
Red	Did not qualify (DNQ)
Red	Did not pre-qualify (DNPQ)
Black	Disqualified (DSQ)
White	Did not start (DNS)
White	Withdrew (WD)
White	Race cancelled (C)
Blank	Did not practice (DNP)
Blank	Did not arrive (DNA)
Blank	Excluded (EX)

**Bold** – Pole
Italics – Fastest Lap
