= Lars Engblom =

Swedish male curler

- Curler ♂
- Born: 4 April 1955 (age 71)

Team
- Curling club: Timrå CK & Härnösands CK

Curling career
- Member Association: Sweden
- European Championship: 1 (1987)
- Other appearances: World Senior Championships: 1 (2006)
Medal record
Curling
European Championships
Gold medal – first place	1987 Oberstdorf
World Senior Curling Championships
Bronze medal – third place	2006 Copenhagen
Swedish Men's Championship
Gold medal – first place	1987

Lars Ove Engblom (born 4 April 1955) is a Swedish curler.

He is a 1987 European champion and a Swedish men's champion.

== Teams ==
Season	Skip	Third	Second	Lead	Alternate	Coach	Events
1986–87	Thomas Norgren	Jan Strandlund	Lars Strandqvist	Lars Engblom			SMCC 1987 (gold)
1987–88	Thomas Norgren	Jan Strandlund	Lars Strandqvist	Lars Engblom	Olle Håkansson	Olle Håkansson	ECC 1987 (gold)
2006	Jan Ullsten	Björn Rudström	Lars Strandqvist	Lars Engblom			WSCC 2006 (bronze)
