= Michael Harry =

Danish male curler and coach

- Curler ♂
- Born: 23 May 1961 (age 65); Hvidovre

Team
- Curling club: Hvidovre CC, Hvidovre

Curling career
- Member Association: Denmark
- World Championship: 7 (1982, 1986, 1987, 1988, 1993, 1994)
- European Championship: 6 (1979, 1980, 1981, 1987, 1991, 1994)
- Olympic: 1 (1988, demonstration)
Medal record
Curling
European Championships
Bronze medal – third place	1981 Grindelwald
Danish Men's Championship
Gold medal – first place	1979
Gold medal – first place	1982
Gold medal – first place	1987
Gold medal – first place	1988
Gold medal – first place	1993
Gold medal – first place	1994
Gold medal – first place	1995

Michael Harry (born 23 May 1961 in Hvidovre) is a Danish curler and curling coach.

At the international level, he is a 1981 European bronze medallist.

At the national level, he is a seven-time Danish men's champion curler (1979, 1982, 1987, 1988, 1993, 1994, 1995).

He participated in the curling demonstration event at the 1988 Winter Olympics, where the Danish men's team finished sixth.

== Teams ==
Season	Skip	Third	Second	Lead	Alternate	Coach	Events
1978–79	Per Berg	Gert Larsen	Jan Hansen	Michael Harry			DMCC 1979 (gold)
1979–80	Per Berg	Gert Larsen	Jan Hansen	Michael Harry			ECC 1979 (6th)
1980–81	Per Berg	Gert Larsen	Jan Hansen	Michael Harry			ECC 1980 (6th)
1981–82	Per Berg	Gert Larsen	Jan Hansen	Michael Harry		Antonny Hinge	ECC 1981 (bronze); DMCC 1982 (gold); WCC 1982 (8th)
1985–86	Tommy Stjerne	Per Berg	Peter Andersen	Ivan Frederiksen	Michael Harry		WCC 1986 (8th)
1986–87	Gert Larsen	Oluf Olsen	Jan Hansen	Michael Harry			DMCC 1987 (gold); WCC 1987 (4th)
1987–88	Gert Larsen	Oluf Olsen	Jan Hansen	Michael Harry			WOG 1988, demo (6th); DMCC 1988 (gold); WCC 1988 (8th)
1991–92	Gert Larsen	Oluf Olsen	Michael Harry	Henrik Jakobsen	Ulrik Schmidt		ECC 1991 (6th)
1992–93	Gert Larsen	Oluf Olsen	Michael Harry	Henrik Jakobsen	Tom Nielsen		DMCC 1993 (gold); WCC 1993 (5th)
1993–94	Gert Larsen	Oluf Olsen	Michael Harry	Henrik Jakobsen	Tom Nielsen (DMCC), Tommy Stjerne (WCC)		DMCC 1994 (gold); WCC 1994 (7th)
1994–95	Gert Larsen	Oluf Olsen	Michael Harry	Henrik Jakobsen	Tom Nielsen		ECC 1994 (10th); DMCC 1995 (gold)

== Record as a coach of national teams ==
Year	Tournament, event	National team	Place
2012	2012 European Junior Curling Challenge	Denmark (junior women)	2nd place, silver medalist(s)
