= Olle Håkansson (curler) =

Swedish male curler and coach

- Curler ♂
- Born: 14 September 1956 (age 70); Sundsvall

Team
- Curling club: Sundsvalls CK

Curling career
- Member Association: Sweden
- European Championship: 4 (1984, 1987, 1992, 1996)
Medal record
Curling
European Championships
| Gold medal – first place | 1987 Oberstdorf |
| Silver medal – second place | 1992 Oberstdorf |
Swedish Men's Championship
| Gold medal – first place | 1984 |

Olle Håkansson (born 14 September 1956 in Sundsvall) is a former Swedish curler and curling coach.

He is a 1987 European champion and a 1984 Swedish men's champion.

He is an author of several books.

== Teams ==
| Season | Skip | Third | Second | Lead | Alternate | Coach | Events |
|---|---|---|---|---|---|---|---|
| 1983–84 | Per Carlsén | Jan Strandlund | Tommy Olin | Olle Håkansson | | | SMCC 1984 (gold) |
| 1984–85 | Per Carlsén | Jan Strandlund | Tommy Olin | Olle Håkansson | | | ECC 1984 (7th) |
| 1987–88 | Thomas Norgren | Jan Strandlund | Lars Strandqvist | Lars Engblom | Olle Håkansson | Olle Håkansson | ECC 1987 (gold) |
| 1992–93 | Per Carlsén | Henrik Holmberg | Tommy Olin | Olle Håkansson | Mikael Norberg | | ECC 1992 (silver) |

== Record as a coach of national teams ==
| Year | Tournament, event | National team | Place |
|---|---|---|---|
| 1987 | 1987 European Curling Championships | Sweden (men) | 1st place, gold medalist(s) |
| 2002 | 2002 World Men's Curling Championship | Sweden (men) | 8 |
| 2003 | 2003 World Men's Curling Championship | Sweden (men) | 5 |
| 2006 | 2006 European Curling Championships | Sweden (men) | 3rd place, bronze medalist(s) |
