= Theo Welschen =

Swiss curler

- Curler ♂

Team
- Curling club: CC Zermatt, Zermatt

Curling career
- Member Association: Switzerland
- World Championship: 1 (1965)
Medal record
Curling
Swiss Men's Championship
Gold medal – first place	1951 Wengen
Gold medal – first place	1960 Wengen
Gold medal – first place	1961 St. Moritz
Gold medal – first place	1965 Gstaad

Theo Welschen is a former Swiss curler.

At the international level, he skipped Swiss men's team on 1965 World Men's Championship (Swiss team finished fifth).

At the national level, he is a four-time Swiss men's champion curler (1951, 1960, 1961, 1965), and all four times team line-up was the same.

== Teams ==
Season	Skip	Third	Second	Lead	Events
1950—51	Theo Welschen	Hermann Truffer	Karl Bayard	Alfonse Biner	SMCC 1951 (gold)
1959—60	Theo Welschen	Hermann Truffer	Karl Bayard	Alfonse Biner	SMCC 1960 (gold)
1960—61	Theo Welschen	Hermann Truffer	Karl Bayard	Alfonse Biner	SMCC 1961 (gold)
1964—65	Theo Welschen	Hermann Truffer	Karl Bayard	Alfonse Biner	SMCC 1965 (gold); WCC 1965 (5th)
