= 1993 World Men's Curling Championship =

- Host city: Geneva, Switzerland
- Arena: Patinoire des Vernets
- Dates: March 28 – April 4, 1993
- Winner: Canada
- Curling club: Penetang CC, Penetanguishene
- Skip: Russ Howard
- Third: Glenn Howard
- Second: Wayne Middaugh
- Lead: Peter Corner
- Alternate: Larry Merkley
- Finalist: Scotland (David Smith)

The 1993 World Men's Curling Championship was held at the Patinoire des Vernets in Geneva, Switzerland from March 28 to April 4.

== Teams ==
Australia	Canada	Denmark	France	Germany
New South Wales CC, Victoria Skip: Hugh Millikin; Third: Tom Kidd; Second: Gerald Chick; Lead: Brian Johnson; Alternate: Neil Galbraith	Penetang CC, Penetanguishene, Ontario Skip: Russ Howard; Third: Glenn Howard; Second: Wayne Middaugh; Lead: Peter Corner; Alternate: Larry Merkley	Hvidovre CC Skip: Gert Larsen; Third: Oluf Olsen; Second: Michael Harry; Lead: Henrik Jakobsen; Alternate: Tom Nielsen	Megève CC Skip: Claude Feige; Third: Jan Henri Ducroz; Second: Daniel Moratelli; Lead: Laurent Flenghi; Alternate: Joel Indergand	EC Oberstdorf Skip: Wolfgang Burba; Third: Bernhard Mayr; Second: Markus Herberg; Lead: Martin Beiser; Alternate: Daniel Herberg
Norway	Scotland	Sweden	Switzerland	United States
Risenga CK, Oslo Skip: Tormod Andreassen; Third: Stig-Arne Gunnestad; Second: Flemming Davanger; Lead: Kjell Berg; Alternate: Pål Trulsen	St. Martins CC, Perth Skip: David Smith; Third: Graeme Connal; Second: Peter Smith; Lead: David Hay; Alternate: Gordon Muirhead	Östersunds CK Skip: Peter Lindholm; Third: Tomas Nordin; Second: Magnus Swartling; Lead: Peter Narup; Alternate: Örjan Jonsson	CC Winterthur Skip: Dieter Wüest; Third: Jens Piesbergen; Second: Peter Grendelmeier; Lead: Simon Roth; Alternate: Martin Zürrer	Bemidji CC, Bemidji, Minnesota Skip: Scott Baird; Third: Pete Fenson; Second: Mark Haluptzok; Lead: Tim Johnson; Alternate: Dan Haluptzok

== Round-robin standings ==
Key
Teams to playoffs
Teams to tiebreakers

Country	Skip	W	L
Canada	Russ Howard	7	2
Scotland	David Smith	7	2
Switzerland	Dieter Wüest	5	4
United States	Scott Baird	5	4
Denmark	Gert Larsen	5	4
Australia	Hugh Millikin	4	5
Norway	Tormod Andreassen	4	5
Sweden	Peja Lindholm	4	5
Germany	Wolfgang Burba	3	6
France	Claude Feige	1	8

== Round-robin results ==
=== Draw 1 ===
Sheet A	Final
France (Feige)	6
United States (Baird)	8

Sheet B	Final
Switzerland (Wüest)	1
Germany (Burba)	7

Sheet C	Final
Denmark (Larsen)	3
Canada (Howard)	8

Sheet D	Final
Sweden (Lindholm)	4
Australia (Millikin)	6

Sheet E	Final
Norway (Andreassen)	2
Scotland (Smith)	9

=== Draw 2 ===
Sheet A	Final
Sweden (Lindholm)	9
France (Feige)	2

Sheet B	Final
Norway (Andreassen)	7
Germany (Burba)	6

Sheet C	Final
Denmark (Larsen)	5
United States (Baird)	6

Sheet D	Final
Switzerland (Wüest)	12
Australia (Millikin)	8

Sheet E	Final
Canada (Howard)	9
Scotland (Smith)	2

=== Draw 3 ===
Sheet A	Final
United States (Baird)	11
Germany (Burba)	4

Sheet B	Final
Sweden (Lindholm)	6
Norway (Andreassen)	5

Sheet C	Final
France (Feige)	2
Denmark (Larsen)	7

Sheet D	Final
Scotland (Smith)	4
Switzerland (Wüest)	3

Sheet E	Final
Australia (Millikin)	7
Canada (Howard)	10

=== Draw 4 ===
Sheet A	Final
Scotland (Smith)	6
France (Feige)	5

Sheet B	Final
Norway (Andreassen)	5
United States (Baird)	6

Sheet C	Final
Switzerland (Wüest)	4
Sweden (Lindholm)	5

Sheet D	Final
Australia (Millikin)	4
Denmark (Larsen)	7

Sheet E	Final
Germany (Burba)	8
Canada (Howard)	6

=== Draw 5 ===
Sheet A	Final
France (Feige)	4
Norway (Andreassen)	14

Sheet B	Final
Canada (Howard)	9
Sweden (Lindholm)	8

Sheet C	Final
United States (Baird)	0
Scotland (Smith)	10

Sheet D	Final
Germany (Burba)	12
Australia (Millikin)	3

Sheet E	Final
Denmark (Larsen)	6
Switzerland (Wüest)	10

=== Draw 6 ===
Sheet A	Final
Australia (Millikin)	7
Scotland (Smith)	3

Sheet B	Final
Denmark (Larsen)	8
Norway (Andreassen)	5

Sheet C	Final
Canada (Howard)	9
Switzerland (Wüest)	5

Sheet D	Final
United States (Baird)	8
Sweden (Lindholm)	4

Sheet E	Final
Germany (Burba)	4
France (Feige)	5

=== Draw 7 ===
Sheet A	Final
Germany (Burba)	3
Scotland (Smith)	7

Sheet B	Final
Denmark (Larsen)	8
Sweden (Lindholm)	6

Sheet C	Final
Canada (Howard)	9
United States (Baird)	7

Sheet D	Final
France (Feige)	6
Switzerland (Wüest)	7

Sheet E	Final
Australia (Millikin)	2
Norway (Andreassen)	9

=== Draw 8 ===
Sheet A	Final
Germany (Burba)	6
Denmark (Larsen)	7

Sheet B	Final
Switzerland (Wüest)	5
United States (Baird)	4

Sheet C	Final
Australia (Millikin)	6
France (Feige)	5

Sheet D	Final
Canada (Howard)	4
Norway (Andreassen)	7

Sheet E	Final
Scotland (Smith)	5
Sweden (Lindholm)	4

=== Draw 9 ===
Sheet A	Final
Norway (Andreassen)	5
Switzerland (Wüest)	8

Sheet B	Final
France (Feige)	7
Canada (Howard)	9

Sheet C	Final
Scotland (Smith)	7
Denmark (Larsen)	5

Sheet D	Final
Sweden (Lindholm)	9
Germany (Burba)	5

Sheet E	Final
United States (Baird)	8
Australia (Millikin)	9

== Tiebreakers ==
Sheet A	Final
Switzerland (Wüest)	8
United States (Baird)	6

Sheet A	Final
United States (Baird)	7
Denmark (Larsen)	3

== Playoffs ==
=== Brackets ===
Semi-final
1	Canada	6
4	United States	5
2	Scotland	9
3	Switzerland	2

Final
1	Canada	8
2	Scotland	4

=== Final ===
Sheet A	1	2	3	4	5	6	7	8	9	10	Final
Scotland (Smith)	0	0	0	1	0	2	0	1	0	X	4
Canada (Howard)	0	0	1	0	1	0	3	0	3	X	8

1993 WCF Championship
(Canada)
Canada
21st title
