= Jan Strandlund =

Swedish male curler and coach

- Curler ♂
- Born: 28 October 1962 (age 64)

Team
- Curling club: Sundsvalls CK, Timrå CK, Falu CC, Örnsköldsviks CK

Curling career
- Member Association: Sweden
- World Championship: 1 (1999)
- European Championship: 4 (1984, 1987, 1991, 1996)
Medal record
Curling
European Championships
Gold medal – first place	1987 Oberstdorf
Silver medal – second place	1996 Copenhagen
Swedish Men's Championship
Gold medal – first place	1984
Gold medal – first place	1987
Gold medal – first place	1991
Gold medal – first place	1996

Jan Strandlund (born 28 October 1962) is a Swedish curler and curling coach.

He is a 1987 European champion and a four-time Swedish men's champion as well as a three-time Swedish mixed champion.

In 1996 he was inducted into the Swedish Curling Hall of Fame.

== Teams ==
=== Men's ===
Season	Skip	Third	Second	Lead	Alternate	Coach	Events
1983–84	Jan Strandlund	Kent Hammarström	Tomas Andersson	Ulf Wallgren			SJCC 1984 (gold)
1983–84	Jan Strandlund	Ulf Wallgren	Kent Hammarström	Tomas Andersson			WJCC 1984 (6th)
1983–84	Per Carlsén	Jan Strandlund	Tommy Olin	Olle Håkansson			SMCC 1984 (gold)
1984–85	Per Carlsén	Jan Strandlund	Tommy Olin	Olle Håkansson			ECC 1984 (7th)
1986–87	Thomas Norgren	Jan Strandlund	Lars Strandqvist	Lars Engblom			SMCC 1987 (gold)
1987–88	Thomas Norgren	Jan Strandlund	Lars Strandqvist	Lars Engblom	Olle Håkansson	Olle Håkansson	ECC 1987 (gold)
1990–91	Per Hedén	Jan Strandlund	Kenneth Rydén	Jan Lundblad			SMCC 1991 (gold)
1991–92	Per Hedén	Jan Strandlund	Kenneth Rydén	Jan Lundblad	Lars-Åke Nordström		ECC 1991 (4th)
1995–96	Lars-Åke Nordström	Jan Strandlund	Örjan Jonsson	Owe Ljungdahl			SMCC 1996 (gold)
1996–97	Lars-Åke Nordström	Jan Strandlund	Örjan Jonsson	Owe Ljungdahl	Hans Nordin	Stefan Hasselborg	ECC 1996 (silver)
1998–99	Per Carlsén	Mikael Norberg	Tommy Olin	Niklas Berggren, Jan Strandlund		Stefan Larsson	WCC 1999 (9th)
2003–04	Thomas Norgren	Jan Strandlund	Hans Nyman	Leif Nyman			
2005–06	Hans Nyman	Thomas Norgren	Jan Strandlund	Leif Nyman			
2007–08	Hans Nyman	Thomas Norgren	Jan Strandlund	Leif Nyman	Erik Salen		
2009–10	Hans Nyman	Thomas Norgren	Jan Strandlund	Erik Salen			

=== Mixed ===
Season	Skip	Third	Second	Lead	Events
1987	Per Hedén	Anneli Burman	Jan Strandlund	Annica Ericsson	SMxCC 1987 (gold)
1989	Per Hedén	Anneli Burman	Jan Strandlund	Annica Ericsson	SMxCC 1989 (gold)
1990	Per Hedén	Anneli Burman	Jan Strandlund	Annica Ericsson	SMxCC 1990 (gold)

== Record as a coach of national teams ==
Year	Tournament, event	National team	Place
1993	1993 European Curling Championships	Sweden (women)	1st place, gold medalist(s)
1994	1994 European Curling Championships	Sweden (men)	3rd place, bronze medalist(s)
1995	1995 European Curling Championships	Sweden (women)	3rd place, bronze medalist(s)
1997	1997 European Curling Championships	Sweden (women)	1st place, gold medalist(s)
1998	1998 Winter Olympics	Sweden (women)	3rd place, bronze medalist(s)
1998	1998 World Women's Curling Championship	Sweden (women)	1st place, gold medalist(s)
2000	2000 World Women's Curling Championship	Sweden (women)	5
2000	2000 European Curling Championships	Sweden (women)	1st place, gold medalist(s)
2002	2002 Winter Olympics	Sweden (women)	6
2002	2002 World Junior Curling Championships	Sweden (junior men)	2nd place, silver medalist(s)
