= Oluf Olsen =

Danish male curler

- Curler ♂
- Born: 31 December 1957 (age 68); Frederiksberg

Team
- Curling club: Hvidovre CC, Hvidovre

Curling career
- Member Association: Denmark
- World Championship: 7 (1977, 1981, 1983, 1987, 1988, 1993, 1994)
- European Championship: 3 (1978, 1991, 1994)
- Olympic: 1 (1988, demonstration)
- Other appearances: World Junior Championships: 3 (1976, 1978, 1979)
Medal record
Curling
European Championships
| Bronze medal – third place | 1978 Aviemore |
Danish Men's Championship
| Gold medal – first place | 1977 |
| Gold medal – first place | 1981 |
| Gold medal – first place | 1983 |
| Gold medal – first place | 1987 |
| Gold medal – first place | 1988 |
| Gold medal – first place | 1993 |
| Gold medal – first place | 1994 |
| Gold medal – first place | 1995 |

Oluf "Luffe" Olsen (born 31 December 1957 in Frederiksberg) is a Danish curler.

At the international level, he is a 1978 European bronze medallist.

At the national level, he is an eight-time Danish men's champion curler (1977, 1981, 1983, 1987, 1988, 1993, 1994, 1995). He is also a three-time Danish junior champion curler (1976, 1978, 1979).

He participated at the demonstration curling event at the 1988 Winter Olympics, where the Danish men's team finished sixth.

== Teams ==
| Season | Skip | Third | Second | Lead | Alternate | Events |
|---|---|---|---|---|---|---|
| 1975–76 | Tommy Stjerne | Oluf Olsen | Peter Andersen | Steen Hansen | | DJCC 1976 (gold); WJCC 1976 (9th) |
| 1976–77 | Tommy Stjerne | Oluf Olsen | Steen Hansen | Peter Andersen | | DMCC 1977 (gold); WCC 1977 (10th) |
| 1977–78 | Tommy Stjerne | Oluf Olsen | Steen Hansen | Peter Andersen | | DJCC 1978 (gold); WJCC 1978 (8th) |
| 1978–79 | Tommy Stjerne | Oluf Olsen | Steen Hansen | Peter Andersen | | ECC 1978 (bronze); DJCC 1979 (gold); WJCC 1979 (6th) |
| 1980–81 | Tommy Stjerne | Oluf Olsen | Steen Hansen | Peter Andersen | | DMCC 1981 (gold); WCC 1981 (9th) |
| 1982–83 | Tommy Stjerne | Oluf Olsen | Steen Hansen | Peter Andersen | | DMCC 1983 (gold); WCC 1983 (7th) |
| 1986–87 | Gert Larsen | Oluf Olsen | Jan Hansen | Michael Harry | | DMCC 1987 (gold); WCC 1987 (4th) |
| 1987–88 | Gert Larsen | Oluf Olsen | Jan Hansen | Michael Harry | | WOG 1988, demo (6th); DMCC 1988 (gold); WCC 1988 (8th) |
| 1991–92 | Gert Larsen | Oluf Olsen | Michael Harry | Henrik Jakobsen | Ulrik Schmidt | ECC 1991 (6th) |
| 1992–93 | Gert Larsen | Oluf Olsen | Michael Harry | Henrik Jakobsen | Tom Nielsen | DMCC 1993 (gold); WCC 1993 (5th) |
| 1993–94 | Gert Larsen | Oluf Olsen | Michael Harry | Henrik Jakobsen | Tom Nielsen (DMCC), Tommy Stjerne (WCC) | DMCC 1994 (gold); WCC 1994 (7th) |
| 1994–95 | Gert Larsen | Oluf Olsen | Michael Harry | Henrik Jakobsen | Tom Nielsen | ECC 1994 (10th); DMCC 1995 (gold) |
