= Marc Brügger =

Swiss male curler and coach

- Curler ♂

Team
- Curling club: CC Kloten (Kloten)

Curling career
- Member Association: Switzerland
- World Championship: 1 (1990)
- European Championship: 1 (1991)
Medal record
Curling
European Championships
Bronze medal – third place	1991 Chamonix
Swiss Men's Championship
Gold medal – first place	1990 Uzwil

Marc Brügger is a Swiss curler and coach.

He is a 1991 European bronze medallist and a Swiss men's champion (1990).

As a coach of Swiss women's national team he participated on 2010 Winter Olympics and number of World and European championships.

== Teams ==
Season	Skip	Third	Second	Lead	Alternate	Events
1989–90	Daniel Model	Beat Stephan	Marc Brügger	Lukas Fankhauser		SMCC 1990 (gold); WCC 1990 (6th)
1991–92	Daniel Model	Mario Flückiger	Michael Lips	Thomas Lips	Marc Brügger	ECC 1991 (bronze)

== Record as a coach of national teams ==
Year	Tournament, event	National team	Place
2001	2001 European Curling Championships	Switzerland (women)	3rd place, bronze medalist(s)
2003	2003 European Curling Championships	Switzerland (women)	2nd place, silver medalist(s)
2004	2004 World Women's Curling Championship	Switzerland (women)	3rd place, bronze medalist(s)
2007	2007 European Curling Championships	Switzerland (women)	4
2008	2008 World Women's Curling Championship	Switzerland (women)	3rd place, bronze medalist(s)
2008	2008 European Curling Championships	Switzerland (women)	1st place, gold medalist(s)
2010	2010 Winter Olympics	Switzerland (women)	4
