= Jan-Olov Nässén =

Swedish male curler

- Curler ♂
- Other names: Janne
- Born: 8 December 1957 (age 68)

Team
- Curling club: Frösö-Oden CK, Östersund, Östersunds CK, Östersund

Curling career
- Member Association: Sweden
- World Championship: 3 (1989, 1994, 1995)
Medal record
Curling
World Championships
Silver medal – second place	1994 Oberstdorf
Bronze medal – third place	1989 Milwaukee

Jan-Olov Gullik "Janne" Nässén (born 8 December 1957) is a Swedish curler and curling coach.

He is a 1994 World men's silver medallist and a 1989 World men's bronze medallist.

In 1995 he was inducted into the Swedish Curling Hall of Fame.

== Teams ==
Season	Skip	Third	Second	Lead	Alternate	Events
1988–89	Thomas Norgren	Jan-Olov Nässén	Anders Lööf	Mikael Ljungberg	Peter Cederwall	WCC 1989 (bronze)
1993–94	Jan-Olov Nässén	Anders Lööf	Mikael Ljungberg	Leif Sätter	Örjan Jonsson	WCC 1994 (silver)
1994–95	Peter Lindholm	Tomas Nordin	Magnus Swartling	Peter Narup	Jan-Olov Nässén	WCC 1995 (7th)
2002–03	Jan-Olov Nässén	Anders Lööf	Mikael Ljungberg	Leif Sätter		SSCC 2003 (gold)
2008–09	Jan-Olov Nässén	Anders Lööf	Mikael Ljungberg	Leif Sätter		
2012–13	Jan-Olov Nässén	Anders Lööf	Mikael Ljungberg	Leif Sätter		SSCC 2013 (5th)
2013–14	Jan-Olov Nässén	Anders Lööf	Mikael Ljungberg	Leif Sätter		SSCC 2014 (bronze)

== Record as a coach of national teams ==
Year	Tournament, event	National team	Place
1996	1996 European Curling Championships	Sweden (women)	2nd place, silver medalist(s)
1999	1999 World Junior Curling Championships	Sweden (junior women)	4
