= Markus Känzig =

Swiss curler

- Curler

Team
- Curling club: Olten CC, Olten

Curling career
- Member Association: Switzerland
- World Championship: 1 (1985)
- European Championship: 2 (1989, 1990)
Medal record
Curling
Swiss Men's Championship
Gold medal – first place	1985 Bern

Markus Känzig is a Swiss curler.

At the national level, he is a 1985 Swiss men's champion curler.

== Teams ==
Season	Skip	Third	Second	Lead	Events
1981–82	Markus Känzig	Silvano Flückiger	Rolf Walser	Conrad Engler	MerPM 1982 (gold)
1984–85	Markus Känzig	Silvano Flückiger	Rolf Walser	Mario Flückiger	SMCC 1985 (gold); WCC 1985 (8th)
1989–90	Markus Känzig	Silvano Flückiger	Mario Flückiger	Michel Evard	ECC 1989 (6th)
1990–91	Markus Känzig	Silvano Flückiger	Cristoph Richter	Mario Flückiger	ECC 1990 (5th)
1996–97	Mario Flückiger	Markus Känzig	Stephan Luder	Raphael Brutsch	
2019–20	Christof Schwaller	Markus Känzig	Robert Hürlimann	Pierre Hug	SSCC 2020 (bronze)
