= Csaba Kesjár =

Hungarian racing driver

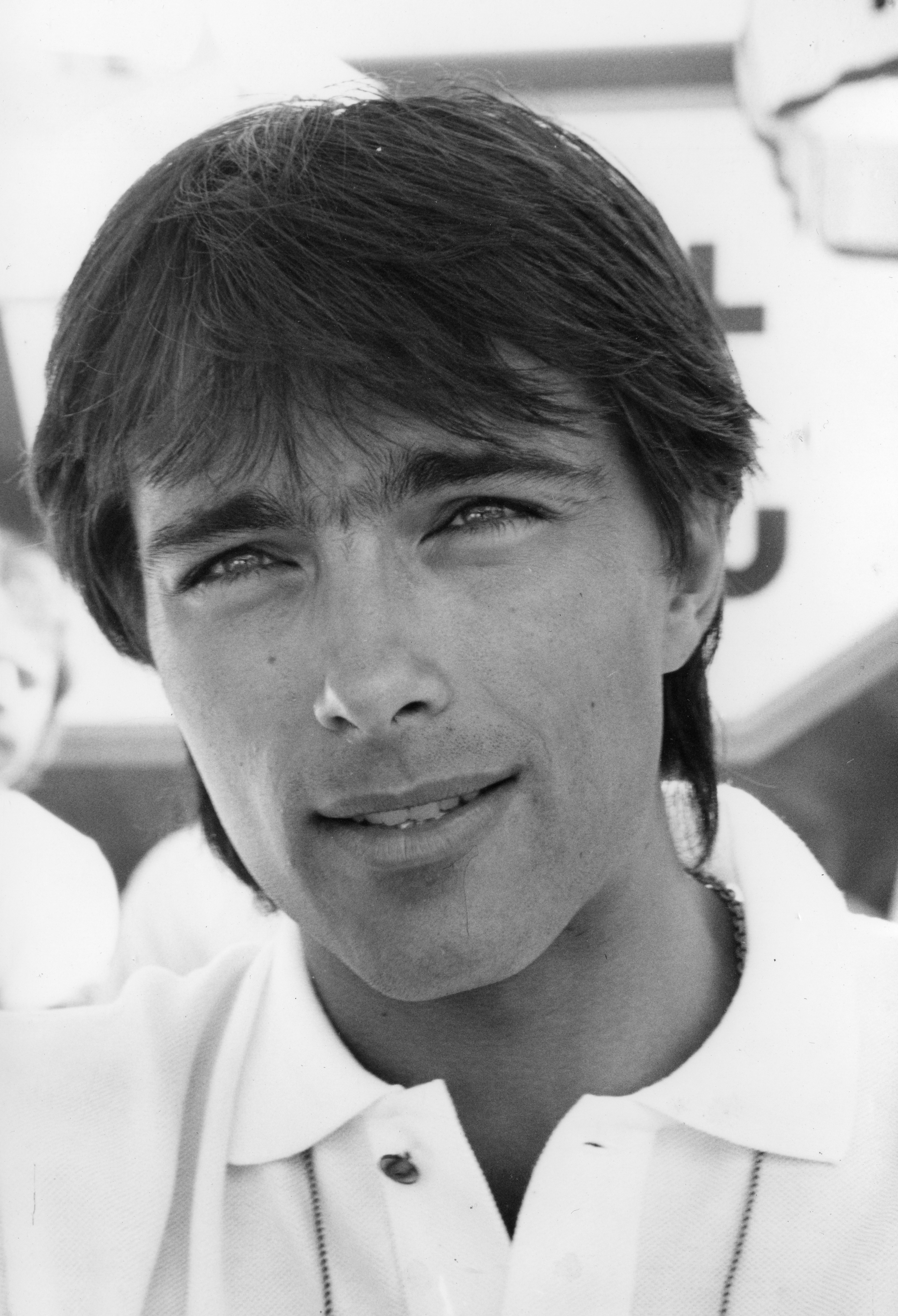
- Nationality: (Hungary) Hungarian
- Born: 9 February 1962 Budapest, Hungary
- Died: 24 June 1988 (aged 26) Norisring, Nuremberg, Germany

German Formula Three Championship
- Years active: 1987–1988
- Teams: Schübel Rennsport Int.
- Car number: 1
- Starts: 14
- Wins: 0
- Poles: 0
- Fastest laps: 1
- Best finish: 14th in 1987

Previous series
- 1986 1982–1985: Austrian Formula Ford; Hungarian Formula Easter

Csaba Kesjár (9 February 1962 – 24 June 1988) was a Hungarian racing driver who was born in Budapest and died in Norisring, Nuremberg.

== Career ==
Csaba Kesjár's father János and his grandfather were also racing drivers. He began to race go-karts in his native Hungary in 1975 and went on to become the national champion on several occasions.

Kesjár moved on to participate in the Hungarian Formula Easter series between 1982 and 1985, winning four consecutive championship titles. During that time, he also participated in the international Cup of Peace and Friendship, winning the fifth and final race of the 1983 season.

In 1986, Kesjár drove for Walter Lechner Racing in the Austrian Formula Ford series and won the championship title in a Reynard-constructed car. He also became the Hungarian hillclimbing champion during the same year.

In 1987, Kesjár moved on to drive a Volkswagen-powered Dallara for Horst Schübel Racing in the German Formula Three Championship. Although his team-mate Bernd Schneider won the series that year, Kesjár was only classified 14th in the overall standings. He achieved his best race result by finishing fourth at the Österreichring, although he did manage to win a non-championship race at the Hockenheimring.

Hours after the 1987 Hungarian Grand Prix, Kesjár drove Zakspeed's Formula One car at the Hungaroring as part of a commercial endeavour. He completed three laps and thus became the first Hungarian to drive a Formula One car sixteen years prior to Zsolt Baumgartner becoming the country's first driver to actually start a Grand Prix.

In 1988, Kesjár continued his participation in the German Formula Three Championship with Horst Schübel Racing and a Volkswagen-powered Dallara. He accumulated a total of 33 championship points in the first six races of the season.

== Death ==
Kesjár was killed on 24 June 1988 at the Norisring street circuit in Nuremberg. The fatal accident occurred at the end of the first practice session for what would have been the seventh race of that year's German Formula Three Championship. The time had run out and Kesjár was only allowed to complete his ongoing lap. He approached the penultimate turn, the Dutzendteichkehre hairpin, but failed to negotiate it and crashed straight into the steel barrier at around 200 km/h (125 mph). The car broke through the steel barrier and two rows of tires, before it came to a halt in the nearby park. Kesjár's death was instantaneous. A marshal who saw the incident said that the driver did not make any attempts to brake and steer.

The race that was supposed to take place two days later was eventually cancelled. Despite facing pressure to race from their bosses and sponsors, the remaining drivers refused to do so out of respect for their fallen colleague.

The exact cause of Kesjár's fatal accident has remained a mystery. According to the investigation report, the brakes on his Dallara had failed. Additionally, there were rumours that the driver might have suffered an epileptic seizure or a blackout seconds before the impact, even the possibility that he had committed suicide was considered. Years later, Kesjár's father claimed that his son's car had been manipulated.

Kesjár was buried in Budapest.

== Racing record ==
=== Formula Easter ===
Cup of Peace and Friendship
Season	Car	Races	Wins	Podiums	Points	Championship position
1983	MTX 1-06	4	1	1	139	8th
1984	MTX 1-06	4	0	0	115	14th
1985	MTX 1-07	5	0	0	145	7th

=== Formula 3 ===
FIA European Formula 3 Cup
Year	Team	Car	Engine	Position
1987	Schübel Motorsport	Dallara 387	Volkswagen	16th

German Formula Three Championship
Season	Team	Car	Engine	Races	Wins	Podiums	Fastest laps	Pole positions	Points	Championship position
1987	Schübel Motorsport	Dallara 387	Volkswagen	8	0	0	0	0	12	14th
1988	Schübel Motorsport	Dallara 388/009	Volkswagen	7	0	0	1	0	33	19th
