= Örjan Jonsson =

Swedish male curler

- Curler ♂
- Born: 8 November 1969 (age 57)

Team
- Curling club: Härnösands CK, Härnösand, Östersunds CK, Östersund, Örnsköldsviks CK, Örnsköldsvik

Curling career
- Member Association: Sweden
- World Championship: 2 (1993, 1994)
- European Championship: 2 (1993, 1996)
Medal record
Curling
World Championships
Silver medal – second place	1994 Oberstdorf
European Championships
Silver medal – second place	1996 Copenhagen
Swedish Men's Championship
Gold medal – first place	1993
Gold medal – first place	1996

Örjan Jonsson (born 8 November 1969) is a retired Swedish curler.

He is a 1994 World men's silver medallist.

== Teams ==
Season	Skip	Third	Second	Lead	Alternate	Coach	Events
1986–87	Tomas Nordin	Örjan Jonsson	Glenn Haglund	Stefan Timan			SJCC 1987 (gold); WJCC 1987 (7th)
1990–91	Tomas Nordin	Örjan Jonsson	Stefan Timan	Jan Wallin	Peja Lindholm (WJCC)		SJCC 1991 (gold); WJCC 1991 (7th)
1992–93	Peter Lindholm	Tomas Nordin	Magnus Swartling	Peter Narup	Örjan Jonsson		SMCC 1993 (gold); WCC 1993 (6th)
1993–94	Peter Lindholm	Tomas Nordin	Magnus Swartling	Peter Narup	Örjan Jonsson		ECC 1993 (5th)
1993–94	Jan-Olov Nässén	Anders Lööf	Mikael Ljungberg	Leif Sätter	Örjan Jonsson		WCC 1994 (silver)
1995–96	Lars-Åke Nordström	Jan Strandlund	Örjan Jonsson	Owe Ljungdahl			SMCC 1996 (gold)
1996–97	Lars-Åke Nordström	Jan Strandlund	Örjan Jonsson	Owe Ljungdahl	Hans Nordin	Stefan Hasselborg	ECC 1996 (silver)
2001–02	Bosse Sjölund	Jan Wallin	Anders Lööf	Örjan Jonsson			
2003–04	Örjan Jonsson	Per Granqvist	Jan Wallin	Flemming Patz			
