= Leif Sätter =

Swedish male curler

- Curler ♂
- Born: 8 August 1961 (age 65)

Team
- Curling club: Östersunds CK, Östersund

Curling career
- Member Association: Sweden
- World Championship: 1 (1994)
Medal record
Curling
World Championships
Silver medal – second place	1994 Oberstdorf

Leif Robert Sätter (born 8 August 1961) is a Swedish curler.

He is a 1994 World men's silver medallist.

== Teams ==
Season	Skip	Third	Second	Lead	Alternate	Events
1993–94	Jan-Olov Nässén	Anders Lööf	Mikael Ljungberg	Leif Sätter	Örjan Jonsson	WCC 1994 (silver)
1997–98	Martin Mattsson	Anders Lööf	Leif Sätter	Mikael Ljungberg		
2002–03	Jan-Olov Nässén	Anders Lööf	Mikael Ljungberg	Leif Sätter		SSCC 2003 (gold)
2008–09	Jan-Olov Nässén	Anders Lööf	Mikael Ljungberg	Leif Sätter		
2012–13	Jan-Olov Nässén	Anders Lööf	Mikael Ljungberg	Leif Sätter		SSCC 2013 (5th)
2013–14	Jan-Olov Nässén	Anders Lööf	Mikael Ljungberg	Leif Sätter		SSCC 2014 (bronze)
