= Tom Nielsen =

Danish male curler

- Curler ♂

Team
- Curling club: Hvidovre CC, Hvidovre

Curling career
- Member Association: Denmark
- World Championship: 1 (1993)
- European Championship: 1 (1994)
Medal record
Curling
Danish Men's Championship
Gold medal – first place	1993
Gold medal – first place	1994
Gold medal – first place	1995

Tom Nielsen is a Danish curler.

At the international level, he participated in 1993 World Men's championship and 1994 European championships.

At the national level, he is a three-time Danish men's champion curler (1993, 1994, 1995).

== Teams ==
Season	Skip	Third	Second	Lead	Alternate	Events
1992–93	Gert Larsen	Oluf Olsen	Michael Harry	Henrik Jakobsen	Tom Nielsen	DMCC 1993 (gold); WCC 1993 (5th)
1993–94	Gert Larsen	Oluf Olsen	Michael Harry	Henrik Jakobsen	Tom Nielsen	DMCC 1994 (gold)
1994–95	Gert Larsen	Oluf Olsen	Michael Harry	Henrik Jakobsen	Tom Nielsen	ECC 1994 (10th); DMCC 1995 (gold)
