= Terje Lyshaug =

Norwegian curler

- Curler ♂

Team
- Curling club: Risenga CK, Oslo

Curling career
- Member Association: Norway
- World Championship: 1 (1994)
Medal record
Curling

Terje Lyshaug is a Norwegian curler.

== Teams ==
Season	Skip	Third	Second	Lead	Alternate	Events
1993–94	Tormod Andreassen	Stig-Arne Gunnestad	Flemming Davanger	Kjell Berg	Terje Lyshaug	WCC 1994 (6th)
