= Lars Strandqvist =

Swedish male curler (born 1955)

- Curler ♂
- Born: 4 April 1955 (age 71)

Team
- Curling club: Timrå CK

Curling career
- Member Association: Sweden
- European Championship: 1 (1987)
- Other appearances: World Senior Championships: 1 (2006)
Medal record
Curling
European Championships
| Gold medal – first place | 1987 Oberstdorf |
Swedish Men's Championship
| Gold medal – first place | 1987 |
World Senior Championships
| Bronze medal – third place | 2006 Copenhagen |

Lars Strandqvist (born 4 April 1955) is a Swedish curler.

He is a 1987 European champion and a Swedish men's champion.

== Teams ==
| Season | Skip | Third | Second | Lead | Alternate | Coach | Events |
|---|---|---|---|---|---|---|---|
| 1986–87 | Thomas Norgren | Jan Strandlund | Lars Strandqvist | Lars Engblom | | | SMCC 1987 (gold) |
| 1987–88 | Thomas Norgren | Jan Strandlund | Lars Strandqvist | Lars Engblom | Olle Håkansson | Olle Håkansson | ECC 1987 (gold) |
| 2006 | Jan Ullsten | Björn Rudström | Lars Strandqvist | Lars Engblom | | | WSCC 2006 (bronze) |
| 2013–14 | Emil Marklund | Lars Strandqvist | Erik Strandqvist | Magnus Kling | | | SMCC 2014 (7th) |
| 2014–15 | Emil Marklund | Lars Strandqvist | Magnus Kling | Erik Strandqvist | | | |
