= Thomas Norgren =

Swedish male curler and coach

- Curler ♂
- Other names: Nogga
- Born: 8 December 1961 (age 64)

Team
- Curling club: CK Skvadern, Timrå CK, Frösö-Oden CK

Curling career
- Member Association: Sweden
- World Championship: 2 (1989, 2002)
- European Championship: 1 (1987)
Medal record
Curling
World Championships
Bronze medal – third place	1989 Milwaukee
European Championships
Gold medal – first place	1987 Oberstdorf
Swedish Men's Championship
Gold medal – first place	1987
Gold medal – first place	1994

Thomas "Nogga" Norgren (born 8 December 1961) is a Swedish curler and curling coach.

He is a 1987 European champion and 1989 World championship bronze medallist.

In 1995 he was inducted into the Swedish Curling Hall of Fame.

== Teams ==
Season	Skip	Third	Second	Lead	Alternate	Coach	Events
1979–80	Thomas Norgren	Conny Ekholm	Peter Svedlund	Ecke Pettersson			SJCC 1980 (gold); WJCC 1980 (bronze)
1980–81	Thomas Norgren	Peter Svedlund	Conny Ekholm	Ecke Pettersson			SJCC 1981 (gold); WJCC 1981 (4th)
1986–87	Thomas Norgren	Jan Strandlund	Lars Strandqvist	Lars Engblom			SMCC 1987 (gold)
1987–88	Thomas Norgren	Jan Strandlund	Lars Strandqvist	Lars Engblom	Olle Håkansson	Olle Håkansson	ECC 1987 (gold)
1988–89	Thomas Norgren	Jan-Olov Nässén	Anders Lööf	Mikael Ljungberg	Peter Cederwall		WCC 1989 (bronze)
2002	Per Carlsén	Mikael Norberg	Tommy Olin	Niklas Berggren	Thomas Norgren	Olle Håkansson	WCC 2002 (8th)
2003–04	Thomas Norgren	Jan Strandlund	Hans Nyman	Leif Nyman			
2005–06	Hans Nyman	Thomas Norgren	Jan Strandlund	Leif Nyman			
2007–08	Hans Nyman	Thomas Norgren	Jan Strandlund	Leif Nyman	Erik Salen		
2009–10	Hans Nyman	Thomas Norgren	Jan Strandlund	Erik Salen			
2012–13	Johan Ceder	Thomas Norgren	Sven Olsson	Jonas Olsson	Niklas Svenman		

== Record as a coach of national teams ==
Year	Tournament, event	National team	Place
1997	1997 European Curling Championships	Sweden (men)	4
1998	1998 World Men's Curling Championship	Sweden (men)	2nd place, silver medalist(s)
