= Dan Haluptzok =

American curler

- Curler ♂
- Born: c. 1947

Team
- Curling club: Bemidji CC, Bemidji, MN

Curling career
- Member Association: United States
- World Championship: 3 (1979, 1993, 1994)
Medal record
Curling
World Championships
Bronze medal – third place	1993 Geneva
United States Men's Championship
Gold medal – first place	1979 Superior
Gold medal – first place	1993 St. Paul
Gold medal – first place	1994 Duluth
Bronze medal – third place	1981 Fairbanks
Bronze medal – third place	1986 Seattle
Bronze medal – third place	1988 St. Paul

Dan Haluptzok is an American curler.

He is a 1993 World Men's bronze medallist.

== Teams ==
Season	Skip	Third	Second	Lead	Alternate	Events
1978–79	Scott Baird	Dan Haluptzok	Mark Haluptzok	Bob Fenson		USMCC 1979 (gold); WCC 1979 (5th)
1980–81	Mark Haluptzok	Dan Haluptzok	Bob Fenson	John Iserealson		USMCC 1981 (bronze)
1985–86	Scott Baird	Dan Haluptzok	Mark Haluptzok	Bob Fenson		USMCC 1986 (bronze)
1987–88	Scott Baird	Dan Haluptzok	Mark Haluptzok	Bob Fenson		USMCC 1988 (bronze)
1992–93	Scott Baird	Pete Fenson	Mark Haluptzok	Tim Johnson	Dan Haluptzok	USMCC 1993 (gold); WCC 1993 (bronze)
1993–94	Scott Baird	Pete Fenson	Mark Haluptzok	Tim Johnson	Dan Haluptzok	USMCC 1994 (gold); WCC 1994 (5th)

== Private life ==
He is from family of curlers. His father, mother and younger brother Mark are curlers too. Dan played with Mark in three World championships (1979, 1993, 1994).
