= Dieter Wüest =

Swiss curler

- Curler ♂

Team
- Curling club: CC Winterthur, Winterthur

Curling career
- Member Association: Switzerland
- World Championship: 1 (1993)
- World Mixed Championship: 1 (2024)
- European Championship: 1 (1987)
- Other appearances: World Senior Championships: 2 (2018, 2025)
Medal record
Curling
World Championships
Bronze medal – third place	1993 Geneva
World Mixed Championship
Bronze medal – third place	2024 Aberdeen
European Championships
Bronze medal – third place	1987 Oberstdorf
Swiss Men's Championship
Gold medal – first place	1993 Genève

Dieter Wüest is a Swiss curler.

At the international level, he is a 1993 World Men's bronze medallist.

At the national level, he is a Swiss men's (1993) and mixed (2002) champion curler.

== Teams ==
=== Men's ===
Season	Skip	Third	Second	Lead	Alternate	Coach	Events
1987–88	Dieter Wüest	Jens Piesbergen	Peter Grendelmeier	Simon Roth			ECC 1987 (bronze)
1992–93	Dieter Wüest	Jens Piesbergen	Peter Grendelmeier	Simon Roth	Martin Zürrer (WCC)		SMCC 1993 (gold); WCC 1993 (bronze)
2017–18	Dieter Wüest	Jens Piesbergen	Martin Zürrer	Marc Syfrig	Ernst Erb	Ernst Erb	WSCC 2018 (5th)
2018–19	Dieter Wüest	Jens Piesbergen	Martin Zürrer	Marc Syfrig			

=== Mixed ===
Season	Skip	Third	Second	Lead	Alternate	Events
2001–02	Dieter Wüest	Isabelle Wüest	Jens Piesbergen	Brigitte Fischer	Corinne Egloff	SMxCC 2002 (gold)
