= Stefan Karnusian =

Swiss curler

Stefan Karnusian is a Swiss curler who has represented Switzerland internationally.

He was part of the Swiss team at the 2005 Ford World Men's Curling Championship.

He was skip for the Swiss team at the 2010 World Men's Curling Championship.
