= 2018 World Senior Curling Championships =

- Host city: Östersund, Sweden
- Arena: Östersund Arena
- Dates: 21–28 April
- Men's winner: Canada
- Curling club: Saville Community Sports Centre, Edmonton
- Skip: Wade White
- Third: Barry Chwedoruk
- Second: Daniel Holowaychuk
- Lead: George White
- Finalist: Sweden
- Women's winner: Canada
- Curling club: Nutana Curling Club, Saskatoon
- Skip: Sherry Anderson
- Third: Patty Hersikorn
- Second: Brenda Goertzen
- Lead: Anita Silvernagle
- Finalist: United States

The 2018 World Senior Curling Championships was held from 21 to 28 April at the Östersund Arena in Östersund, Sweden. The event was held in conjunction with the 2018 World Mixed Doubles Curling Championship. Canada won both the men's and women's events.

== Men ==
=== Round Robin Standings ===
Key
Teams to Playoffs

Group A	Skip	W	L
Australia	Hugh Millikin	6	0
Sweden	Mats Wranå	5	1
Scotland	Gordon Muirhead	4	2
Italy	Roberto Lacedelli	3	3
Slovenia	Matjaz Prezelj	2	4
Czech Republic	Milos Plzak	1	5
Netherlands	Johannes Koornstra	0	6

Group B	Skip	W	L
Switzerland	Dieter Wüest	6	0
Canada	Wade White	5	1
Germany	Johnny Jahr	4	2
England	John Brown	3	3
France	Pascal Adam	2	4
Turkey	Murat Akin	1	5
Belgium	Walter Verbueken	0	6

Group C	Skip	W	L
Norway	Tormod Andreassen	6	0
United States	Jeff Wright	4	2
Finland	Jussi Uusipaavalniemi	3	3
Ireland	Johnjo Kenny	3	3
Latvia	Ansis Regža	3	3
Russia	Igor Minin	2	4
Croatia	Neven Pufnik	0	6

Group D	Skip	W	L
Denmark	Ulrik Schmidt	6	0
New Zealand	Hans Frauenlob	5	1
Wales	Adrian Meikle	4	2
Israel	Kevin Golberg	3	3
Japan	Masayasu Sato	2	4
Hong Kong	Peter Wong	1	5
Poland	Krzysztof Nowak	0	6

== Playoffs ==
Round of 12
United States	6
Finland	2
Sweden	7
Germany	2
6	Canada	5
11	Wales	3
7	New Zealand	4
10	Scotland	7

Quarterfinals
1	Switzerland	3
8	United States	7
4	Denmark	6
5	Sweden	7
3	Norway	5
6	Canada	6
2	Australia	4
10	Scotland	6

Semifinals
7	United States	4
5	Sweden	6
6	Canada	9
10	Scotland	3

Final
5	Sweden	2
6	Canada	8

Bronze Medal Game
7	United States	7
10	Scotland	2

== Women ==
=== Round Robin Standings ===
Key
Teams to Playoffs

Group A	Skip	W	L
United States	Margie Smith	6	1
Canada	Sherry Anderson	6	1
Sweden	Anette Norberg	6	1
Japan	Miyuki Kawamura	4	3
Russia	Tatiana Smirnova	3	4
Australia	Sandy Gagnon	2	5
Lithuania	Rasa Veronika Jasaitiene	1	6
Poland	Did not start		

Group B	Skip	W	L
Switzerland	Dagmar Frei	6	1
Scotland	Susan Kesley	6	1
Finland	Elina Virtaala	5	2
England	Judith Dixon	4	3
Latvia	Elēna Kāpostiņa	4	3
Ireland	Marie O'Kane	2	5
Italy	Lucilla Macchiati	1	6
New Zealand	Liz Matthews	0	7

=== Playoffs ===
Quarterfinals
B2	Scotland	5
A3	Sweden	6
B3	Finland	6
A2	Canada	10

Semifinals
A1	United States	6
A3	Sweden	3
B1	Switzerland	5
A2	Canada	7

Final
A1	United States	4
A2	Canada	5

Bronze Medal Game
B1	Switzerland	5
A3	Sweden	3
