= Swiss Men's Curling Championship =

National curling championship

- Established: 1943
- 2026 host city: Bern
- 2026 arena: Curling Bern
- 2026 champion: Marco Hösli

The Swiss Men's Curling Championship is the national championship of men's curling in Switzerland. It has been held annually since 1943.

== List of champions ==
Year	Host city	Skip	Club
1943	Pontresina	Gilgian Aellig	Adelboden CC
1944	Gstaad	Hans Grossenbacher	Bern CC
1945	Adelboden	Paul Lareida	St. Moritz-Engiadina
1946	Engelberg	Hans Trog	Kandersteg
1947	Crans-sur-Sierre	Rudolf Wehren	Saanenmöser
1948	Grindelwald	Rudolf Wehren	Saanenmöser
1949	St. Moritz	Rudolf Wehren	Saanenmöser
1950	Zermatt	Martin Hofmann	Kleine Scheidegg
1951	Wengen	Theo Welschen	Zermatt
1952	Davos	Beny Konzett	Grindelwald CC
1953	Saanen	Ernst Steuri	Grindelwald-Swiss
1954	Grindelwald	Fritz Gertsch	Wengen-Jungfrau
1955	Pontresina	Franz Blaser	Bern-City
1956	Saanenmöse	Curdin Clavuot	Samedan
1957	Mürren	Eduard Nikles	Adelboden CC
1958	Arosa	Robert Kohler	St. Moritz-Surlej
1959	Zermatt	Narcisse Spozio	Montreux-Caux
1960	Wengen	Theo Welschen	Zermatt
1961	St. Moritz	Theo Welschen	Zermatt
1962	Champéry	Gerold Keller	Rigi-Kaltbad
1963	Kandersteg	Gerold Keller	Rigi-Kaltbad
1964	Flims	Gerold Keller	Rigi-Kaltbad
1965	Gstaad	Theo Welschen	Zermatt
1966	Adelboden	Paul Kundert	Rigi-Kaltbad
1967	Samedan	Franz Marti	Thun CC
1968	Montana	Franz Marti	Thun CC
1969	Wengen	Fred Theurillat	Basel-Ysfäger
1970	Arosa	Fred Theurillat	Basel-Ysfäger
1971	Genève	Cesare Canepa	Zug CC
1972	Bern	Peter Attinger Sr.	Dübendorf
1973	Bern	Werner Oswald	Zug CC
1974	Wallisellen	Peter Attinger Jr.	Dübendorf
1975	Genève	Otto Danieli	Zürich-Crystal
1976	Arlesheim	Adolf Aerni	Olten CC
1977	Wildhaus	Jon Carl Rizzi	Scuol-Tarasp
1978	Lausanne	Fredy Collioud	Bern-Zähringer
1979	Biel	Peter Attinger Jr.	Dübendorf
1980	Wallisellen	Jürg Tanner	Lausanne-Riviera
1981	Leukerbad	Jürg Tanner	Lausanne-Riviera
1982	Arlesheim	Jürg Tanner	Lausanne-Riviera
1983	Wildhaus	Bruno Binggeli	Bern-Wildstrubel
1984	Genève	Peter Attinger Jr.	Dübendorf
1985	Bern	Markus Känzig	Olten CC
1986	Wildhaus	Jürg Tanner	Lausanne-Ouchy
1987	Leukerbad	Felix Luchsinger	Stäfa
1988	Lausanne-Malley	Daniel Model	Kloten CC
1989	Engelberg	Patrick Hürlimann	Lausanne-Olympique
1990	Uzwil	Daniel Model	Kloten CC
1991	Engelberg	Markus Eggler	Biel-Touring
1992	Flims	Markus Eggler	Biel-Touring
1993	Genève	Dieter Wüest	Winterthur
1994	Biel/Bienne	Markus Eggler	Biel-Touring
1995	Arlesheim	Andreas Schwaller	St. Moritz CC
1996	Arlesheim	Patrick Hürlimann	Lausanne-Olympique
1997	Bern	Patrick Netzer	Basel-Ysfäger
1998	Bern	Christof Schwaller	St. Moritz CC
1999	Bern	Patrick Hürlimann	Lausanne-Olympique
2000	Bern	Andreas Schwaller	Biel-Touring
2001	Bern	Patrick Hürlimann	Lausanne-Olympique
2002	Basel/Arlesheim	Ralph Stöckli	St. Galler Bär
2003	Basel/Arlesheim	Bernhard Werthemann	Basel-Ysfäger
2004	Bern	Andreas Schwaller	Baden Regio 1
2005	Bern	Ralph Stöckli	St. Galler Bär
2006	Berm	Andreas Schwaller	Baden Regio Privera
2007	Wetzikon	Ralph Stöckli	Basel Regio Hochstrasser
2008	Wetzikon	Claudio Pescia	St. Galler Bär 1
2009	Bern	Ralph Stöckli	Basel Regio Hochstrasser
2010	Bern	Stefan Karnusian	St. Moritz Pfister
2011	Gstaad	Christof Schwaller	St. Moritz Pfister
2012	Gstaad	Jan Hauser	Glarus CC
2013	Gstaad	Sven Michel	CC Adelboden
2014	Schaffhausen	Peter de Cruz	CC Genève
2015	Schaffhausen	Marc Pfister	CC Bern
2016	Flims	Sven Michel	CC Adelboden
2017	Flims	Peter de Cruz	CC Genève
2018	Flims	Marc Pfister	CC Adelboden
2019	Thun	Peter de Cruz	CC Genève
2020	Thun	Yannick Schwaller	Bern Zähringer
2021	Arlesheim	Peter de Cruz	CC Genève
2022	Thônex	Yannick Schwaller	Bern Zähringer
2023	Thônex	Yannick Schwaller	CC Genève
2024	Thônex	Yannick Schwaller	CC Genève
2025	Bern	Yannick Schwaller	CC Genève
2026	Bern	Marco Hösli	CC Glarus

== See also ==
- Swiss Women's Curling Championship
- Swiss Mixed Doubles Curling Championship
- Swiss Mixed Curling Championship
- Swiss Junior Curling Championships
- Swiss Junior Mixed Doubles Curling Championship
- Swiss Wheelchair Curling Championship
- Swiss Senior Curling Championships
