= Stephanie Risdal =

Danish curler

- Curler ♀
- Born: Stephanie Nielsen; 16 August 1991 (age 35); Copenhagen, Denmark

Team
- Curling club: Hvidovre CC, Hvidovre

Curling career
- Member Association: Denmark
- World Championship: 3 (2015, 2016, 2017)
- European Championship: 3 (2014, 2015, 2016)
- Other appearances: World Junior Championships: 1 (2013), European Youth Olympic Winter Festival: 1 (2009), European Junior Challenge: 4 (2010, 2011, 2012, 2013)
Medal record
Curling
Danish Women's Championship
Gold medal – first place	2016
Gold medal – first place	2017
European Youth Olympic Winter Festival
Bronze medal – third place	2009 Bielsko-Biala
European Junior Challenge
Gold medal – first place	2013 Prague
Silver medal – second place	2010 Prague
Silver medal – second place	2012 Copenhagen

Stephanie Risdal Nielsen (born 16 August 1991 in Copenhagen as Stephanie Nielsen) is a Danish female curler.

== Teams ==
Season	Skip	Third	Second	Lead	Alternate	Coach	Events
2008–09	Mette de Neergaard	Stephanie Nielsen	Cecilie Hygom	Jannie Gundry	Isabella Glenstrøm	Ch. Hidegand	EYOWF 2009 (bronze)
2009–10	Stephanie Nielsen	Christine Svensen	Jannie Gundry	Ivana Bratic	Cecilie Hygom	Kirsten Jensen	DJCC 2010 (gold); EJCC 2010 (silver)
2010–11	Stephanie Nielsen	Jannie Gundry	Christine Svensen	Cecilie Hygom	Charlotte Clemmensen	Kirsten Jensen	DJCC 2011 (gold); EJCC 2011 (4th)
2011–12	Stephanie Nielsen	Jannie Gundry	Christine Svensen	Natasha Hinze Glenstrøm	Charlotte Clemmensen	Michael Harry	DJCC 2012 (gold); EJCC 2012 (silver)
2012–13	Stephanie Risdal Nielsen	Jannie Gundry	Isabella Clemmensen	Charlotte Clemmensen	Julie Høgh	Ulrik Schmidt (EJCC); Helena Blach Lavrsen (WJCC)	DJCC 2013 (gold); EJCC 2013 (gold); WJCC 2013 (6th)
2012–13	Stephanie Risdal Nielsen	Jannie Gundry	Chalotte Gundry	Julie Høgh	Isabella Clemmensen		DWCC 2013 (4th)
2013–14	Stephanie Risdal Nielsen	Jannie Gundry	Charlotte Clemmensen	Julie Høgh	Isabella Clemmensen		DWCC 2014 (4th)
2014–15	Lene Nielsen	Jeanne Ellegaard	Stephanie Risdal Nielsen	Charlotte Clemmensen	Isabella Clemmensen	Ulrik Schmidt	ECC 2014 (4th); WCC 2015 (8th)
2015–16	Lene Nielsen	Stephanie Risdal	Isabella Clemmensen	Charlotte Clemmensen	Madeleine Dupont	Ulrik Schmidt	ECC 2015 (4th); WCC 2016 (8th)
2015–16	Lene Nielsen	Stephanie Risdal	Charlotte Clemmensen	Isabella Clemmensen			DWCC 2016 (gold)
2016–17	Lene Nielsen	Madeleine Dupont	Stephanie Risdal	Charlotte Clemmensen	Denise Dupont	Ulrik Schmidt	ECC 2016 (5th); DWCC 2017 (gold); WCC 2017 (12th)
