= Christine Grønbech =

Danish curler (born 1993)

- Curler ♀
- Born: Christine Svensen; 24 October 1993 (age 33)

Team
- Curling club: Tårnby CC, Tårnby, Hvidovre CC, Hvidovre

Curling career
- Member Association: Denmark
- World Championship: 2 (2014, 2018)
- World Mixed Doubles Championship: 4 (2009, 2010, 2018, 2019)
- Other appearances: World Junior Championships: 2 (2009, 2014), European Junior Challenge: 4 (2010, 2011, 2012, 2015)
Medal record
Curling
European Junior Challenge
Silver medal – second place	2010 Prague
Silver medal – second place	2012 Copenhagen
Danish Women's Championship
Gold medal – first place	2014
Silver medal – second place	2013
Silver medal – second place	2016
Silver medal – second place	2017

Christine Grønbech (born 24 October 1993 as Christine Svensen) is a Danish female curler.

At the international level, she is a two-time European Junior Challenge silver medallist (2010, 2012).

At the national level, she is a 2014 Danish women's champion, four-time mixed doubles champion (2009, 2010, 2018, 2019) and five-time junior champion (2010, 2011, 2012, 2014, 2015).

== Teams ==
=== Women's ===
Season	Skip	Third	Second	Lead	Alternate	Coach	Events
2008–09	Mette de Neergaard	Marie de Neergaard	Natascha Hinze Glenstrøm	Charlotte Clemmensen	Christine Svensen	Ole de Neergaard	WJCC 2009 (8th)
2009–10	Stephanie Nielsen	Christine Svensen	Jannie Gundry	Ivana Bratic	Cecilie Hygom	Kirsten Jensen	DJCC 2010 (gold); EJCC 2010 (silver)
2010–11	Stephanie Nielsen	Jannie Gundry	Christine Svensen	Cecilie Hygom	Charlotte Clemmensen	Kirsten Jensen	DJCC 2011 (gold); EJCC 2011 (4th)
2011–12	Stephanie Nielsen	Jannie Gundry	Christine Svensen	Natasha Hinze Glenstrøm	Charlotte Clemmensen	Michael Harry	DJCC 2012 (gold); EJCC 2012 (silver)
2011–12	Madeleine Dupont	Denise Dupont	Christine Svensen	Lina Knudsen			
2012–13	Madeleine Dupont	Denise Dupont	Christine Svensen	Lina Knudsen			DWCC 2013 (silver)
2013–14	Madeleine Dupont	Denise Dupont	Christine Svensen	Lina Knudsen	Isabella Clemmensen (WCC)	Millard Evans	DWCC 2014 (gold); WCC 2014 (10th)
2013–14	Christine Svensen	Isabella Clemmensen	Julie Høgh	Charlotte Clemmensen	Sara Rasmussen (WJCC)	Ulrik Schmidt	DJCC 2014 (gold); WJCC 2014 (10th)
2014–15	Christine Svensen	Isabella Clemmensen	Julie Høgh	Katja Milvang-Jensen	Anna Solberg (EJCC)	Martin Uhd Grønbech	DJCC 2015 (gold); EJCC 2015 (9th)
2015–16	Madeleine Dupont	Christine Svensen	Denise Dupont	Lina Knudsen			DWCC 2016 (silver)
2016–17	Angelina Jensen	Camilla Jensen	Christine Svensen	Pavla Rubasova			DWCC 2017 (silver)
2017–18	Angelina Jensen	Christine Grønbech	Camilla Skårberg Jensen	Lina Almind Knudsen	Ivana Bratic	Jamie Danbrook	WCC 2018 (11th)

=== Mixed doubles ===
Season	Male	Female	Coach	Events
2008–09	Per Svensen	Christine Svensen		DMDCC 2009 (gold); WMDCC 2009 (12th)
2009–10	Martin Uhd Grønbech	Christine Svensen		DMDCC 2010 (gold); WMDCC 2010 (12th)
2017–18	Martin Uhd Grønbech	Christine Grønbech	Per Svensen	DMDCC 2018 (gold); WMDCC 2018 (20th)
2018–19	Martin Uhd Grønbech	Christine Grønbech	Per Svensen	DMDCC 2019 (gold); WMDCC 2019 (22nd)
2019–20	Martin Uhd Grønbech	Christine Grønbech		DMDCC 2020 (silver)

== Personal life ==
In 2017 she married fellow Danish curler and coach Martin Uhd Grønbech. They played together in mixed doubles championships.
