= 2014 European Curling Championships – Women's tournament =

2014 European Curling Championships Women's tournament
- Host city: Champéry, Switzerland
- Arena: Palladium de Champéry
- Dates: November 22–29
- Winner: Switzerland
- Curling club: Flims CC, Flims
- Skip: Binia Feltscher
- Third: Irene Schori
- Second: Franziska Kaufmann
- Lead: Christine Urech
- Alternate: Carole Howald
- Coach: Al Moore
- Finalist: Russia (Anna Sidorova)

The women's tournament of the 2014 European Curling Championships was held from November 22 to 29 at the Palladium de Champéry in Champéry, Switzerland. The winners of the Group C tournament in Zoetermeer, the Netherlands moved on to the Group B tournament. The top eight women's teams at the 2013 European Curling Championships will represent their respective nations at the 2015 World Women's Curling Championship in Sapporo, Japan.

== Group A ==
=== Teams ===
The teams are listed as follows:

Czech Republic	Denmark	Estonia	Finland	Germany
Skip: Linda Klímová; Third: Kamila Mulačová; Second: Kateřina Urbanová; Lead: Kateřina Samueliová; Alternate: Zuzana Hájková	Skip: Lene Nielsen; Third: Stephanie Risdal Nielsen; Second: Jeanne Ellegaard; Lead: Charlotte Clemmensen; Alternate: Isabella Clemmensen	Skip: Maile Mölder; Third: Marie Turmann; Second: Helen Nummert; Lead: Kuellike Ustav; Alternate: Marju Velga	Skip: Sanna Puustinen; Third: Heidi Hossi; Second: Oona Kauste; Lead: Marjo Hippi; Alternate: Maija Salmiovirta	Skip: Andrea Schöpp; Third: Monika Wagner; Second: Lisa Ruch; Lead: Kerstin Ruch
Latvia	Russia	Scotland	Sweden	Switzerland
Skip: Iveta Staša-Šaršūne; Third: Ieva Rudzīte; Second: Daina Barone; Lead: Rasa Brūna; Alternate: Līga Avena	Skip: Anna Sidorova; Third: Margarita Fomina; Second: Alexandra Saitova; Lead: Ekaterina Galkina; Alternate: Nkeiruka Ezekh	Skip: Eve Muirhead; Third: Anna Sloan; Second: Vicki Adams; Lead: Sarah Reid; Alternate: Lauren Gray	Skip: Anna Hasselborg; Third: Agnes Knochenhauer; Second: Karin Rudström; Lead: Zandra Flyg; Alternate: Sara McManus	Skip: Binia Feltscher; Third: Irene Schori; Second: Franziska Kaufmann; Lead: Christine Urech; Alternate: Carole Howald

=== Round-robin standings ===
Final round-robin standings

Key
Teams to Playoffs
Countries relegated to 2015 Group B

Country	Skip	W	L	PF	PA	Ends Won	Ends Lost	Blank Ends	Stolen Ends	Shot Pct.
Russia	Anna Sidorova	9	0	89	29	42	22	4	15	86%
Switzerland	Binia Feltscher	6	3	64	44	40	30	11	13	80%
Scotland	Eve Muirhead	6	3	66	52	40	34	8	9	79%
Denmark	Lene Nielsen	6	3	57	52	35	31	15	11	75%
Sweden	Anna Hasselborg	5	4	55	48	36	33	9	10	76%
Finland	Sanna Puustinen	5	4	54	57	34	35	13	13	72%
Germany	Andrea Schöpp	4	5	51	59	33	37	16	9	71%
Estonia	Maile Mölder	2	7	46	69	31	41	10	6	67%
Latvia	Iveta Staša-Šaršūne	1	8	37	73	26	40	14	5	64%
Czech Republic	Linda Klímová	1	8	41	77	27	41	12	4	68%

=== Round-robin results ===
All draw times are listed in Central European Time (UTC+1).

==== Draw 1 ====
Saturday, November 22, 15:00

Sheet A	1	2	3	4	5	6	7	8	9	10	Final
Denmark (Nielsen) 🔨	0	2	0	0	2	0	1	1	1	0	7
Scotland (Muirhead)	0	0	0	3	0	2	0	0	0	1	6

Sheet B	1	2	3	4	5	6	7	8	9	10	Final
Switzerland (Feltscher) 🔨	0	0	2	0	1	0	0	1	0	1	5
Finland (Puustinen)	0	1	0	3	0	1	0	0	2	0	7

Sheet C	1	2	3	4	5	6	7	8	9	10	Final
Sweden (Hasselborg) 🔨	0	0	2	0	0	2	0	1	0	1	6
Germany (Schöpp)	0	0	0	1	1	0	2	0	0	0	4

Sheet D	1	2	3	4	5	6	7	8	9	10	Final
Czech Republic (Klímová) 🔨	1	1	0	0	0	0	1	1	0	0	4
Latvia (Staša-Šaršūne)	0	0	2	0	1	1	0	0	0	1	5

Sheet E	1	2	3	4	5	6	7	8	9	10	Final
Russia (Sidorova) 🔨	2	0	2	0	3	0	2	0	1	X	10
Estonia (Mölder)	0	2	0	1	0	1	0	2	0	X	6

==== Draw 2 ====
Sunday, November 23, 8:00

Sheet A	1	2	3	4	5	6	7	8	9	10	Final
Finland (Puustinen) 🔨	1	0	0	4	1	0	3	0	0	X	9
Czech Republic (Klímová)	0	1	0	0	0	1	0	3	1	X	6

Sheet B	1	2	3	4	5	6	7	8	9	10	Final
Scotland (Muirhead)	3	0	1	1	0	2	0	0	3	X	10
Latvia (Staša-Šaršūne) 🔨	0	2	0	0	2	0	0	1	0	X	5

Sheet C	1	2	3	4	5	6	7	8	9	10	Final
Russia (Sidorova)	0	3	0	3	2	1	X	X	X	X	9
Denmark (Nielsen) 🔨	0	0	1	0	0	0	X	X	X	X	1

Sheet D	1	2	3	4	5	6	7	8	9	10	Final
Estonia (Mölder) 🔨	1	1	1	0	0	0	1	0	X	X	4
Germany (Schöpp)	0	0	0	1	2	5	0	2	X	X	10

Sheet E	1	2	3	4	5	6	7	8	9	10	Final
Switzerland (Feltscher) 🔨	0	1	1	0	2	1	0	3	X	X	8
Sweden (Hasselborg)	0	0	0	2	0	0	1	0	X	X	3

==== Draw 3 ====
Sunday, November 23, 16:00

Sheet A	1	2	3	4	5	6	7	8	9	10	Final
Germany (Schöpp) 🔨	0	1	0	0	1	1	0	0	0	X	3
Switzerland (Feltscher)	0	0	2	0	0	0	1	1	4	X	8

Sheet B	1	2	3	4	5	6	7	8	9	10	Final
Denmark (Nielsen)	1	0	0	1	0	2	2	0	0	1	7
Estonia (Mölder) 🔨	0	2	0	0	0	0	0	2	0	0	4

Sheet C	1	2	3	4	5	6	7	8	9	10	Final
Scotland (Muirhead) 🔨	2	0	3	0	0	1	0	1	2	X	9
Czech Republic (Klímová)	0	1	0	1	1	0	1	0	0	X	4

Sheet D	1	2	3	4	5	6	7	8	9	10	Final
Sweden (Hasselborg)	0	1	0	1	0	0	1	0	X	X	3
Russia (Sidorova) 🔨	1	0	2	0	2	1	0	3	X	X	9

Sheet E	1	2	3	4	5	6	7	8	9	10	Final
Finland (Puustinen) 🔨	0	0	4	0	2	0	3	1	0	X	10
Latvia (Staša-Šaršūne)	0	0	0	2	0	2	0	0	2	X	6

==== Draw 4 ====
Monday, November 24, 9:00

Sheet A	1	2	3	4	5	6	7	8	9	10	Final
Latvia (Staša-Šaršūne)	0	0	0	0	0	2	0	X	X	X	2
Russia (Sidorova) 🔨	1	2	1	2	1	0	3	X	X	X	10

Sheet B	1	2	3	4	5	6	7	8	9	10	Final
Sweden (Hasselborg) 🔨	0	1	1	4	0	2	X	X	X	X	8
Czech Republic (Klímová)	0	0	0	0	1	0	X	X	X	X	1

Sheet C	1	2	3	4	5	6	7	8	9	10	Final
Estonia (Mölder) 🔨	0	0	1	0	0	0	1	0	0	X	2
Finland (Puustinen)	0	1	0	1	1	3	0	1	1	X	8

Sheet D	1	2	3	4	5	6	7	8	9	10	Final
Germany (Schöpp)	0	0	0	2	0	0	2	0	2	1	7
Denmark (Nielsen) 🔨	0	1	1	0	1	0	0	2	0	0	5

Sheet E	1	2	3	4	5	6	7	8	9	10	Final
Scotland (Muirhead) 🔨	1	1	0	1	1	0	2	0	1	0	7
Switzerland (Feltscher)	0	0	2	0	0	1	0	1	0	1	5

==== Draw 5 ====
Monday, November 24, 19:00

Sheet A	1	2	3	4	5	6	7	8	9	10	11	Final
Sweden (Hasselborg) 🔨	1	1	0	1	0	0	1	0	0	0	3	7
Finland (Puustinen)	0	0	0	0	1	0	0	1	1	1	0	4

Sheet B	1	2	3	4	5	6	7	8	9	10	Final
Russia (Sidorova) 🔨	2	0	0	2	0	4	X	X	X	X	8
Scotland (Muirhead)	0	1	0	0	1	0	X	X	X	X	2

Sheet C	1	2	3	4	5	6	7	8	9	10	Final
Denmark (Nielsen) 🔨	0	1	0	2	0	0	0	4	1	X	8
Latvia (Staša-Šaršūne)	0	0	1	0	2	0	1	0	0	X	4

Sheet D	1	2	3	4	5	6	7	8	9	10	Final
Switzerland (Feltscher)	0	3	0	0	1	0	1	0	0	1	6
Estonia (Mölder) 🔨	1	0	0	1	0	1	0	1	1	0	5

Sheet E	1	2	3	4	5	6	7	8	9	10	11	Final
Czech Republic (Klímová)	0	0	3	0	1	0	0	2	0	0	0	6
Germany (Schöpp) 🔨	0	1	0	1	0	2	0	0	0	2	2	8

==== Draw 6 ====
Tuesday, November 25, 12:00

Sheet A	1	2	3	4	5	6	7	8	9	10	Final
Russia (Sidorova)	1	0	2	0	2	0	0	3	0	1	9
Germany (Schöpp) 🔨	0	1	0	2	0	0	1	0	2	0	6

Sheet B	1	2	3	4	5	6	7	8	9	10	Final
Finland (Puustinen)	0	1	0	0	0	1	0	X	X	X	2
Denmark (Nielsen) 🔨	0	0	2	1	2	0	3	X	X	X	8

Sheet C	1	2	3	4	5	6	7	8	9	10	Final
Czech Republic (Klímová) 🔨	1	0	3	0	2	0	0	0	0	X	6
Switzerland (Feltscher)	0	1	0	1	0	2	3	3	1	X	11

Sheet D	1	2	3	4	5	6	7	8	9	10	Final
Latvia (Staša-Šaršūne) 🔨	0	1	0	2	1	0	0	1	0	0	5
Sweden (Hasselborg)	1	0	2	0	0	2	1	0	0	1	7

Sheet E	1	2	3	4	5	6	7	8	9	10	11	Final
Estonia (Mölder)	0	1	0	0	2	0	2	0	0	3	1	9
Scotland (Muirhead) 🔨	2	0	0	2	0	1	0	2	1	0	0	8

==== Draw 7 ====
Tuesday, November 25, 20:00

Sheet A	1	2	3	4	5	6	7	8	9	10	Final
Switzerland (Feltscher) 🔨	0	0	3	2	2	1	X	X	X	X	8
Latvia (Staša-Šaršūne)	0	0	0	0	0	0	X	X	X	X	0

Sheet B	1	2	3	4	5	6	7	8	9	10	Final
Estonia (Mölder)	0	1	0	0	0	0	X	X	X	X	1
Sweden (Hasselborg) 🔨	2	0	2	3	1	1	X	X	X	X	9

Sheet C	1	2	3	4	5	6	7	8	9	10	Final
Germany (Schöpp)	0	0	0	1	0	1	0	X	X	X	2
Scotland (Muirhead) 🔨	2	2	3	0	2	0	1	X	X	X	10

Sheet D	1	2	3	4	5	6	7	8	9	10	Final
Russia (Sidorova) 🔨	2	3	4	0	1	0	2	X	X	X	12
Finland (Puustinen)	0	0	0	1	0	2	0	X	X	X	3

Sheet E	1	2	3	4	5	6	7	8	9	10	Final
Denmark (Nielsen)	0	2	0	0	2	0	1	0	0	3	8
Czech Republic (Klímová) 🔨	1	0	1	0	0	1	0	3	0	0	6

==== Draw 8 ====
Wednesday, November 26, 14:00

Sheet A	1	2	3	4	5	6	7	8	9	10	Final
Scotland (Muirhead) 🔨	0	0	1	1	0	2	0	1	0	2	7
Sweden (Hasselborg)	0	1	0	0	2	0	1	0	2	0	6

Sheet B	1	2	3	4	5	6	7	8	9	10	Final
Czech Republic (Klímová)	0	0	0	0	0	1	X	X	X	X	1
Russia (Sidorova) 🔨	4	1	2	3	3	0	X	X	X	X	13

Sheet C	1	2	3	4	5	6	7	8	9	10	Final
Latvia (Staša-Šaršūne)	0	0	1	1	0	0	1	0	1	X	4
Estonia (Mölder) 🔨	2	2	0	0	0	2	0	3	0	X	9

Sheet D	1	2	3	4	5	6	7	8	9	10	Final
Denmark (Nielsen) 🔨	1	0	0	2	1	0	0	0	0	0	4
Switzerland (Feltscher)	0	2	0	0	0	2	1	0	1	2	8

Sheet E	1	2	3	4	5	6	7	8	9	10	Final
Germany (Schöpp)	0	1	0	0	1	0	1	1	0	0	4
Finland (Puustinen) 🔨	0	0	1	1	0	0	0	0	2	1	5

==== Draw 9 ====
Thursday, November 27, 9:00

Sheet A	1	2	3	4	5	6	7	8	9	10	Final
Czech Republic (Klímová)	2	0	0	2	0	0	0	3	0	0	7
Estonia (Mölder) 🔨	0	2	0	0	0	0	1	0	2	1	6

Sheet B	1	2	3	4	5	6	7	8	9	10	11	Final
Latvia (Staša-Šaršūne) 🔨	0	1	0	0	0	1	0	1	0	3	0	6
Germany (Schöpp)	0	0	0	0	2	0	2	0	2	0	1	7

Sheet C	1	2	3	4	5	6	7	8	9	10	Final
Switzerland (Feltscher) 🔨	1	0	0	1	0	2	0	1	0	X	5
Russia (Sidorova)	0	1	0	0	2	0	3	0	3	X	9

Sheet D	1	2	3	4	5	6	7	8	9	10	Final
Finland (Puustinen)	0	1	0	2	0	1	0	0	2	0	6
Scotland (Muirhead) 🔨	3	0	0	0	1	0	1	0	0	2	7

Sheet E	1	2	3	4	5	6	7	8	9	10	Final
Sweden (Hasselborg) 🔨	0	1	0	2	0	2	0	1	0	X	6
Denmark (Nielsen)	2	0	2	0	2	0	2	0	1	X	9

=== World Challenge Games ===
The World Challenge Games are held between the eighth-ranked team in the Group A round robin and the winner of the Group B tournament to determine which of these two teams will play at the World Championships.

==== Challenge 1 ====
Friday, November 28, 19:30

Team	1	2	3	4	5	6	7	8	9	10	Final
Estonia (Mölder) 🔨	2	0	2	0	0	4	0	4	X	X	12
Norway (Skaslien)	0	1	0	1	0	0	2	0	X	X	4

==== Challenge 2 ====
Saturday, November 29, 9:00

Team	1	2	3	4	5	6	7	8	9	10	Final
Estonia (Mölder) 🔨	0	0	0	0	1	1	0	1	0	X	3
Norway (Skaslien)	1	1	1	1	0	0	2	0	2	X	8

==== Challenge 3 ====
Saturday, November 29, 14:00

Sheet C	1	2	3	4	5	6	7	8	9	10	Final
Norway (Skaslien) 🔨	1	1	0	1	0	3	0	2	0	0	8
Estonia (Mölder)	0	0	0	0	2	0	3	0	1	1	7

=== Playoffs ===
Page playoff system
1	Russia	5
2	Switzerland	6
3	Scotland	3
4	Denmark	8

Semifinal
1	Russia	9
4	Denmark	4

Final
2	Switzerland	8
1	Russia	7

Bronze-medal game
3	Scotland	8
4	Denmark	4

==== 1 vs. 2 ====
Thursday, November 27, 19:00

Sheet B	1	2	3	4	5	6	7	8	9	10	Final
Russia (Sidorova) 🔨	0	2	1	0	1	0	0	1	0	0	5
Switzerland (Feltscher)	0	0	0	1	0	1	1	0	2	1	6

Player percentages
Russia		Switzerland	
Ekaterina Galkina	78%	Christine Urech	88%
Alexandra Saitova	88%	Franziska Kaufmann	78%
Margarita Fomina	99%	Irene Schori	74%
Anna Sidorova	76%	Binia Feltscher	78%
Total	85%	Total	79%

==== 3 vs. 4 ====
Thursday, November 27, 19:00

Sheet C	1	2	3	4	5	6	7	8	9	10	Final
Scotland (Muirhead)	0	0	1	0	1	0	1	0	X	X	3
Denmark (Nielsen) 🔨	1	2	0	1	0	3	0	1	X	X	8

Player percentages
Scotland		Denmark	
Sarah Reid	88%	Charlotte Clemmensen	83%
Vicki Adams	81%	Jeanne Ellegaard	88%
Anna Sloan	72%	Stephanie Risdal	66%
Eve Muirhead	77%	Lene Nielsen	89%
Total	79%	Total	81%

==== Semifinal ====
Friday, November 28, 13:00

Sheet D	1	2	3	4	5	6	7	8	9	10	Final
Russia (Sidorova) 🔨	2	0	2	0	0	3	0	1	1	X	9
Denmark (Nielsen)	0	1	0	1	1	0	1	0	0	X	4

Player percentages
Russia		Denmark	
Ekaterina Galkina	82%	Charlotte Clemmensen	88%
Alexandra Saitova	86%	Jeanne Ellegaard	85%
Margarita Fomina	86%	Stephanie Risdal	58%
Anna Sidorova	81%	Lene Nielsen	81%
Total	84%	Total	78%

==== Bronze-medal game ====
Friday, November 28, 19:30

Sheet B	1	2	3	4	5	6	7	8	9	10	Final
Scotland (Muirhead)	0	2	0	2	0	2	2	0	X	X	8
Denmark (Nielsen) 🔨	1	0	1	0	1	0	0	1	X	X	4

Player percentages
Scotland		Denmark	
Sarah Reid	97%	Charlotte Clemmensen	81%
Vicki Adams	86%	Jeanne Ellegaard	78%
Anna Sloan	86%	Stephanie Risdal	56%
Eve Muirhead	89%	Lene Nielsen	69%
Total	89%	Total	71%

==== Gold-medal game ====
Saturday, November 29, 10:00

Sheet C	1	2	3	4	5	6	7	8	9	10	Final
Switzerland (Feltscher) 🔨	0	1	0	1	0	2	0	4	0	0	8
Russia (Sidorova)	0	0	1	0	2	0	1	0	2	1	7

Player percentages
Switzerland		Russia	
Christine Urech	92%	Ekaterina Galkina	88%
Franziska Kaufmann	86%	Alexandra Saitova	81%
Irene Schori	79%	Margarita Fomina	86%
Binia Feltscher	75%	Anna Sidorova	80%
Total	83%	Total	84%

=== Player percentages ===
Round Robin only

Leads	%
(Russia) Ekaterina Galkina	87
(Switzerland) Christine Urech	85
(Scotland) Sarah Reid	83
(Denmark) Charlotte Clemmensen	81
(Sweden) Zandra Flyg	77

Seconds	%
(Russia) Alexandra Saitova	87
(Switzerland) Franziska Kaufmann	81
(Scotland) Vicki Adams	77
(Finland) Oona Kauste	76
(Sweden) Karin Rudström	75

Thirds	%
(Russia) Margarita Fomina	85
(Scotland) Anna Sloan	78
(Switzerland) Irene Schori	77
(Sweden) Agnes Knochenhauer	76
(Finland) Heidi Hossi	74

Skips/Fourths	%
(Russia) Anna Sidorova	85
(Switzerland) Binia Feltscher	78
(Sweden) Anna Hasselborg	77
(Scotland) Eve Muirhead	77
(Denmark) Lene Nielsen	76

== Group B ==
=== Teams ===
The teams are listed as follows:

Austria	Belarus	England	Hungary	Italy
Skip: Karina Toth; Third: Constanze Hummelt; Second: Anna Weghuber; Lead: Andrea Höfler; Alternate: Marijke Reitsma	Skip: Alina Pavlyuchik; Third: Natalia Sverzhinskaya; Second: Suzanna Ivashyna; Lead: Ekaterina Kirillova; Alternate: Arina Sverzhinskaya	Skip: Anna Fowler; Third: Angharad Ward; Second: Lauren Pearce; Lead: Naomi Robinson; Alternate: Sarah Decoine	Skip: Dorottya Palancsa; Third: Henrietta Miklai; Second: Vera Kalocsai; Lead: Nikolett Sándor; Alternate: Tímea Nagy	Skip: Veronica Zappone; Third: Elisa Patono; Second: Martina Bronsino; Lead: Arianna Losano; Alternate: Angela Romei
Netherlands	Norway	Poland	Slovakia	Turkey
Skip: Marianne Neeleman; Third: Kimberly Honders; Second: Shirley Miog; Lead: Bonnie Nilhamn; Alternate: Pamela Broks	Skip: Kristin Skaslien; Third: Anneline Skarsmoen; Second: Julie Kjær Molnar; Lead: Kristine Davanger; Alternate: Pia Trulsen	Skip: Marta Pluta; Third: Julia Malinowska; Second: Marta Maliowska; Lead: Ewa Stych; Alternate: Joanna Benet	Third/Fourth: Slávka Zubercová; Third/Fourth: Šárka Zubercová; Skip: Marína Gallová; Lead: Linda Salíni	Skip: Öznur Polat; Third: Dilşat Yıldız; Second: Semiha Konuksever; Lead: Ayşe Gözütok; Alternate: Özlem Polat

=== Round-robin standings ===
Final round-robin standings

Key
Teams to Playoffs
Teams to Tiebreaker
Countries relegated to 2015 Group C

Country	Skip	W	L
Norway	Kristin Skaslien	8	1
Austria	Karina Toth	7	2
Italy	Veronica Zappone	6	3
Hungary	Dorottya Palancsa	5	4
Turkey	Öznur Polat	5	4
England	Anna Fowler	5	4
Netherlands	Marianne Neeleman	4	5
Poland	Marta Pluta	4	5
Belarus	Alina Pavlyuchik	1	8
Slovakia	Marína Gallová	0	9

=== Round-robin results ===
All draw times are listed in Central European Time (UTC+1).

==== Draw 1 ====
Saturday, November 22, 12:00

Sheet A	1	2	3	4	5	6	7	8	9	10	Final
England (Fowler)	0	1	0	1	0	2	0	0	1	0	5
Austria (Toth) 🔨	4	0	0	0	1	0	0	1	0	1	7

Sheet B	1	2	3	4	5	6	7	8	9	10	Final
Turkey (Polat)	1	0	0	3	1	0	0	1	1	X	7
Netherlands (Neeleman) 🔨	0	1	0	0	0	1	0	0	0	X	2

Sheet C	1	2	3	4	5	6	7	8	9	10	Final
Hungary (Palancsa)	0	1	0	0	0	0	X	X	X	X	1
Italy (Zappone) 🔨	4	0	3	1	1	1	X	X	X	X	10

Sheet D	1	2	3	4	5	6	7	8	9	10	11	Final
Poland (Pluta) 🔨	0	0	2	0	1	1	0	1	1	0	1	7
Slovakia (Gallová)	0	2	0	2	0	0	1	0	0	1	0	6

Sheet F	1	2	3	4	5	6	7	8	9	10	Final
Norway (Skaslien) 🔨	1	0	0	1	0	3	2	0	2	X	9
Belarus (Pavlyuchik)	0	0	1	0	1	0	0	2	0	X	4

==== Draw 2 ====
Saturday, November 22, 20:00

Sheet A	1	2	3	4	5	6	7	8	9	10	Final
Turkey (Polat) 🔨	0	0	1	0	1	1	2	0	4	X	9
Poland (Pluta)	2	1	0	1	0	0	0	1	0	X	5

Sheet C	1	2	3	4	5	6	7	8	9	10	Final
Norway (Skaslien)	0	3	0	0	0	0	1	0	1	2	7
Austria (Toth) 🔨	1	0	0	1	2	0	0	1	0	0	5

Sheet D	1	2	3	4	5	6	7	8	9	10	Final
Belarus (Pavlyuchik)	1	0	3	0	0	0	0	1	0	X	5
Hungary (Palancsa) 🔨	0	1	0	1	1	1	1	0	4	X	9

Sheet E	1	2	3	4	5	6	7	8	9	10	Final
England (Fowler) 🔨	4	1	0	0	0	1	0	1	0	X	7
Slovakia (Gallová)	0	0	0	0	2	0	1	0	0	X	3

Sheet F	1	2	3	4	5	6	7	8	9	10	Final
Italy (Zappone)	0	1	0	0	2	0	0	0	1	X	4
Netherlands (Neeleman) 🔨	1	0	1	2	0	0	2	1	0	X	7

==== Draw 3 ====
Sunday, November 23, 14:00

Sheet A	1	2	3	4	5	6	7	8	9	10	Final
Italy (Zappone)	0	0	0	0	2	2	2	0	1	2	9
Belarus (Pavlyuchik) 🔨	2	2	1	2	0	0	0	1	0	0	8

Sheet B	1	2	3	4	5	6	7	8	9	10	Final
Slovakia (Gallová)	0	0	2	0	0	2	2	0	1	0	7
Austria (Toth) 🔨	4	0	0	1	2	0	0	1	0	2	10

Sheet C	1	2	3	4	5	6	7	8	9	10	Final
England (Fowler)	0	2	0	2	0	1	0	0	1	0	6
Turkey (Polat) 🔨	1	0	2	0	1	0	0	1	0	3	8

Sheet D	1	2	3	4	5	6	7	8	9	10	Final
Norway (Skaslien)	0	1	0	0	1	0	0	3	4	X	9
Netherlands (Neeleman) 🔨	1	0	0	1	0	2	0	0	0	X	4

Sheet F	1	2	3	4	5	6	7	8	9	10	11	Final
Poland (Pluta)	1	0	1	0	0	3	0	0	0	1	0	6
Hungary (Palancsa) 🔨	0	1	0	1	1	0	1	1	1	0	1	7

==== Draw 4 ====
Monday, November 24, 8:00

Sheet A	1	2	3	4	5	6	7	8	9	10	Final
Hungary (Palancsa)	0	1	0	0	1	0	5	0	0	2	9
Turkey (Polat) 🔨	1	0	2	1	0	3	0	0	1	0	8

Sheet B	1	2	3	4	5	6	7	8	9	10	Final
Poland (Pluta)	0	0	0	1	2	0	1	0	1	X	5
Italy (Zappone) 🔨	2	1	1	0	0	1	0	1	0	X	6

Sheet C	1	2	3	4	5	6	7	8	9	10	Final
Austria (Toth) 🔨	2	1	0	0	0	4	0	2	0	X	9
Netherlands (Neeleman)	0	0	0	2	0	0	1	0	1	X	4

Sheet E	1	2	3	4	5	6	7	8	9	10	Final
Belarus (Pavlyuchik) 🔨	1	0	1	0	0	1	0	0	X	X	3
England (Fowler)	0	3	0	2	1	0	2	1	X	X	9

Sheet F	1	2	3	4	5	6	7	8	9	10	Final
Slovakia (Gallová)	0	0	0	0	1	0	0	0	X	X	1
Norway (Skaslien) 🔨	0	2	1	0	0	2	2	1	X	X	8

==== Draw 5 ====
Monday, November 24, 16:00

Sheet A	1	2	3	4	5	6	7	8	9	10	Final
Austria (Toth) 🔨	0	3	1	0	0	1	0	3	1	0	9
Italy (Zappone)	5	0	0	2	2	0	1	0	0	1	11

Sheet B	1	2	3	4	5	6	7	8	9	10	Final
Belarus (Pavlyuchik)	1	0	0	0	2	0	0	0	2	X	5
Turkey (Polat) 🔨	0	0	1	2	0	1	1	3	0	X	8

Sheet C	1	2	3	4	5	6	7	8	9	10	Final
Slovakia (Gallová)	2	1	0	0	0	0	0	1	0	X	4
Hungary (Palancsa) 🔨	0	0	2	0	1	2	1	0	1	X	7

Sheet E	1	2	3	4	5	6	7	8	9	10	11	Final
Norway (Skaslien)	1	0	1	0	0	1	0	0	1	1	0	5
Poland (Pluta) 🔨	0	1	0	0	1	0	2	1	0	0	1	6

Sheet F	1	2	3	4	5	6	7	8	9	10	Final
Netherlands (Neeleman)	0	1	0	0	0	0	0	1	0	X	2
England (Fowler) 🔨	0	0	0	0	2	1	0	0	2	X	5

==== Draw 6 ====
Tuesday, November 25, 9:00

Sheet B	1	2	3	4	5	6	7	8	9	10	Final
Netherlands (Neeleman) 🔨	2	0	1	0	1	0	2	0	2	1	9
Slovakia (Gallová)	0	1	0	1	0	3	0	1	0	0	6

Sheet C	1	2	3	4	5	6	7	8	9	10	Final
Belarus (Pavlyuchik) 🔨	0	0	1	0	0	0	0	2	2	1	6
Poland (Pluta)	0	1	0	3	1	1	1	0	0	0	7

Sheet D	1	2	3	4	5	6	7	8	9	10	Final
England (Fowler)	0	0	0	0	0	2	0	1	0	X	3
Norway (Skaslien) 🔨	1	0	0	2	1	0	1	0	2	X	7

Sheet E	1	2	3	4	5	6	7	8	9	10	11	Final
Turkey (Polat)	0	0	2	0	1	0	0	1	0	3	0	7
Italy (Zappone) 🔨	0	1	0	2	0	0	1	0	3	0	2	9

Sheet F	1	2	3	4	5	6	7	8	9	10	Final
Hungary (Palancsa) 🔨	0	0	2	1	0	2	0	0	0	0	5
Austria (Toth)	1	0	0	0	1	0	1	1	1	2	7

==== Draw 7 ====
Tuesday, November 25, 19:00

Sheet A	1	2	3	4	5	6	7	8	9	10	Final
Poland (Pluta)	0	0	0	1	0	1	0	0	X	X	2
Netherlands (Neeleman) 🔨	1	1	0	0	2	0	1	3	X	X	8

Sheet B	1	2	3	4	5	6	7	8	9	10	11	Final
Hungary (Palancsa)	2	0	1	0	0	0	0	1	0	2	0	6
England (Fowler) 🔨	0	1	0	0	3	0	1	0	1	0	4	10

Sheet C	1	2	3	4	5	6	7	8	9	10	Final
Turkey (Polat) 🔨	0	0	0	0	1	0	0	X	X	X	1
Norway (Skaslien)	1	0	2	3	0	3	0	X	X	X	9

Sheet D	1	2	3	4	5	6	7	8	9	10	Final
Slovakia (Gallová) 🔨	2	0	0	0	2	0	0	1	0	X	5
Italy (Zappone)	0	0	2	2	0	1	2	0	2	X	9

Sheet E	1	2	3	4	5	6	7	8	9	10	Final
Austria (Toth) 🔨	0	0	0	1	3	2	0	1	0	X	7
Belarus (Pavlyuchik)	1	1	1	0	0	0	1	0	1	X	5

==== Draw 8 ====
Wednesday, November 26, 12:00

Sheet A	1	2	3	4	5	6	7	8	9	10	Final
Belarus (Pavlyuchik) 🔨	2	0	2	2	0	2	X	X	X	X	8
Slovakia (Gallová)	0	1	0	0	1	0	X	X	X	X	2

Sheet B	1	2	3	4	5	6	7	8	9	10	Final
Italy (Zappone)	0	0	0	0	2	1	0	1	2	0	6
Norway (Skaslien) 🔨	1	1	1	2	0	0	1	0	0	1	7

Sheet D	1	2	3	4	5	6	7	8	9	10	11	Final
Austria (Toth) 🔨	2	0	1	0	1	0	0	1	0	1	1	7
Turkey (Polat)	0	1	0	1	0	2	1	0	1	0	0	6

Sheet E	1	2	3	4	5	6	7	8	9	10	Final
Netherlands (Neeleman)	0	0	0	4	0	1	1	0	0	X	6
Hungary (Palancsa) 🔨	3	1	1	0	2	0	0	1	2	X	10

Sheet F	1	2	3	4	5	6	7	8	9	10	Final
England (Fowler)	2	0	0	0	0	1	2	0	0	X	5
Poland (Pluta) 🔨	0	1	1	3	0	0	0	1	1	X	7

==== Draw 9 ====
Wednesday, November 26, 20:00

Sheet A	1	2	3	4	5	6	7	8	9	10	Final
Norway (Skaslien)	0	2	2	0	0	2	0	3	3	X	12
Hungary (Palancsa) 🔨	3	0	0	0	1	0	2	0	0	X	6

Sheet C	1	2	3	4	5	6	7	8	9	10	11	Final
Netherlands (Neeleman) 🔨	1	2	2	0	1	0	1	0	1	0	2	10
Belarus (Pavlyuchik)	0	0	0	2	0	1	0	2	0	3	0	8

Sheet D	1	2	3	4	5	6	7	8	9	10	Final
Italy (Zappone) 🔨	0	1	1	0	2	1	0	1	0	0	6
England (Fowler)	4	0	0	2	0	0	1	0	0	1	8

Sheet E	1	2	3	4	5	6	7	8	9	10	Final
Poland (Pluta) 🔨	0	2	0	1	1	0	1	0	1	0	6
Austria (Toth)	2	0	1	0	0	2	0	1	0	2	8

Sheet F	1	2	3	4	5	6	7	8	9	10	Final
Turkey (Polat)	2	2	1	3	0	0	0	0	0	X	8
Slovakia (Gallová) 🔨	0	0	0	0	0	2	2	0	1	X	5

=== Tiebreaker ===
Thursday, November 27, 8:30

Sheet C	1	2	3	4	5	6	7	8	9	10	Final
Hungary (Palancsa) 🔨	0	0	1	0	1	0	1	2	1	X	6
Turkey (Polat)	0	0	0	1	0	1	0	0	0	X	2

=== Playoffs ===
Page playoff system
1	Norway	10
2	Austria	5
3	Italy	3
4	Hungary	11

Semifinal
2	Austria	6
4	Hungary	7

Final
1	Norway	10
4	Hungary	6

Bronze-medal game
2	Austria	2
3	Italy	10

==== 1 vs. 2 ====
Thursday, November 27, 14:00

Sheet A	1	2	3	4	5	6	7	8	9	10	Final
Norway (Skaslien) 🔨	1	1	0	3	0	4	0	1	X	X	10
Austria (Toth)	0	0	2	0	2	0	1	0	X	X	5

==== 3 vs. 4 ====
Thursday, November 27, 14:00

Sheet C	1	2	3	4	5	6	7	8	9	10	Final
Italy (Zappone) 🔨	0	0	2	0	1	0	0	0	X	X	3
Hungary (Palancsa)	1	2	0	2	0	3	1	2	X	X	11

==== Semifinal ====
Thursday, November 27, 20:00

Sheet G	1	2	3	4	5	6	7	8	9	10	Final
Austria (Toth) 🔨	1	0	2	0	2	0	1	0	0	0	6
Hungary (Palancsa)	0	2	0	3	0	0	0	1	0	1	7

==== Bronze-medal game ====
Friday, November 28, 10:00

Sheet K	1	2	3	4	5	6	7	8	9	10	Final
Austria (Toth) 🔨	0	0	0	0	0	1	0	1	X	X	2
Italy (Zappone)	1	1	2	1	2	0	3	0	X	X	10

==== Gold-medal game ====
Friday, November 28, 10:00

Team	1	2	3	4	5	6	7	8	9	10	Final
Norway (Skaslien) 🔨	2	0	2	0	0	3	0	0	2	1	10
Hungary (Palancsa)	0	1	0	1	3	0	1	0	0	0	6

== Group C ==
=== Teams ===
Croatia	Ireland	Netherlands	Romania
Skip: Melani Turkovic; Third: Maja Sertic; Second: Emina Crnaic; Lead: Marijana Bozic; Alternate: Ane Miljkovic	Fourth: Katie Kerr; Skip: Margarita Sweeney-Baird; Second: Hazel Gormley-Leahy; Lead: Clare McCormick; Alternate: Ailsa Anderson	Skip: Marianne Neeleman; Third: Kimberly Honders; Second: Shirley Miog; Lead: Bonnie Nilhamn; Alternate: Ester Romijn	Skip: Raluca Daiana Colceriu; Third: Bianca Neagoe; Second: Ana-Maria Săracu; Lead: Alina Cristina Marin
Slovakia	Slovenia	Spain	
Third/Fourth: Slavka Zubercova; Third/Fourth: Sarka Zubercova; Skip: Marina Gallova; Lead: Linda Salini	Skip: Valentina Jurinčič; Third: Anja Kresnik; Second: Petra Klemenc; Lead: Tjaša Jazbec; Alternate: Nina Kremžar	Skip: Oihane Otaegi; Third: Leire Otaegi; Second: Aitana Saenz; Lead: Asun Manterola; Alternate: Melanie Robillard	

=== Round-robin standings ===
Final round-robin standings

Key
Teams to Playoffs

Country	Skip	W	L
Slovakia	Marina Gallova	6	0
Netherlands	Marianne Neeleman	4	2
Spain	Oihane Otaegi	4	2
Slovenia	Valentina Jurinčič	3	3
Croatia	Melani Turkovic	2	4
Ireland	Margarita Sweeney-Baird	1	5
Romania	Daiana Colceriu	1	5

=== Round-robin results ===
All draw times are listed in Central European Time (UTC+1).

==== Draw 2 ====
Sunday, October 5, 12:00

Sheet C	1	2	3	4	5	6	7	8	9	10	Final
Romania (Colceriu)	0	0	1	0	0	0	0	X	X	X	1
Spain (Otaegi) 🔨	2	3	0	3	1	1	3	X	X	X	13

==== Draw 3 ====
Sunday, October 5, 16:00

Sheet A	1	2	3	4	5	6	7	8	9	10	Final
Slovakia (Gallova) 🔨	3	3	0	2	1	1	X	X	X	X	10
Ireland (Sweeney-Baird)	0	0	1	0	0	0	X	X	X	X	1

Sheet B	1	2	3	4	5	6	7	8	9	10	Final
Netherlands (Neeleman) 🔨	0	0	5	1	0	0	1	0	0	0	7
Slovenia (Jurinčič)	1	2	0	0	3	1	0	1	1	1	10

==== Draw 6 ====
Monday, October 6, 12:00

Sheet A	1	2	3	4	5	6	7	8	9	10	Final
Slovenia (Jurinčič)	0	0	3	1	0	0	1	0	0	0	5
Romania (Colceriu) 🔨	1	0	0	0	3	2	0	1	0	1	8

Sheet C	1	2	3	4	5	6	7	8	9	10	Final
Ireland (Sweeney-Baird) 🔨	2	2	0	0	1	0	1	0	0	0	6
Croatia (Turkovic)	0	0	4	1	0	1	0	3	1	2	12

==== Draw 7 ====
Monday, October 6, 16:00

Sheet B	1	2	3	4	5	6	7	8	9	10	Final
Spain (Otaegi) 🔨	0	0	1	0	1	0	0	1	2	X	5
Slovakia (Gallova)	2	2	0	1	0	0	3	0	0	X	8

==== Draw 8 ====
Monday, October 6, 20:00

Sheet A	1	2	3	4	5	6	7	8	9	10	Final
Croatia (Turkovic)	0	0	1	0	0	1	0	X	X	X	2
Spain (Otaegi) 🔨	5	1	0	1	1	0	3	X	X	X	11

Sheet B	1	2	3	4	5	6	7	8	9	10	Final
Romania (Colceriu)	0	0	0	0	0	0	0	X	X	X	0
Netherlands (Neeleman) 🔨	2	1	1	2	2	1	3	X	X	X	12

==== Draw 10 ====
Tuesday, October 7, 12:00

Sheet B	1	2	3	4	5	6	7	8	9	10	Final
Slovenia (Jurinčič) 🔨	2	0	2	0	3	0	2	0	1	X	10
Croatia (Turkovic)	0	2	0	1	0	1	0	1	0	X	5

==== Draw 11 ====
Tuesday, October 7, 16:00

Sheet A	1	2	3	4	5	6	7	8	9	10	Final
Netherlands (Neeleman)	0	2	0	0	0	1	1	2	0	0	6
Slovakia (Gallova) 🔨	1	0	2	1	1	0	0	0	1	1	7

Sheet C	1	2	3	4	5	6	7	8	9	10	Final
Spain (Otaegi) 🔨	3	0	1	0	0	2	0	0	2	X	8
Ireland (Sweeney-Baird)	0	1	0	1	2	0	1	1	0	X	6

==== Draw 13 ====
Wednesday, October 8, 8:00

Sheet A	1	2	3	4	5	6	7	8	9	10	11	Final
Ireland (Sweeney-Baird) 🔨	0	1	0	1	0	1	0	2	3	0	0	8
Slovenia (Jurinčič)	1	0	1	0	1	0	2	0	0	3	1	9

Sheet C	1	2	3	4	5	6	7	8	9	10	Final
Croatia (Turkovic) 🔨	2	1	0	0	1	0	0	1	X	X	5
Netherlands (Neeleman)	0	0	3	1	0	3	0	0	4	X	11

==== Draw 14 ====
Wednesday, October 8, 12:00

Sheet B	1	2	3	4	5	6	7	8	9	10	Final
Slovakia (Gallova) 🔨	3	2	1	1	2	1	0	4	X	X	14
Romania (Colceriu)	0	0	0	0	0	0	2	0	X	X	2

==== Draw 16 ====
Wednesday, October 8, 20:00

Sheet A	1	2	3	4	5	6	7	8	9	10	Final
Romania (Colceriu)	1	0	1	0	0	0	5	0	3	0	10
Croatia (Turkovic) 🔨	0	1	0	2	2	3	0	3	0	2	13

Sheet B	1	2	3	4	5	6	7	8	9	10	Final
Netherlands (Neeleman) 🔨	0	0	1	0	1	2	2	1	1	X	8
Ireland (Sweeney-Baird)	1	1	0	1	0	0	0	0	0	X	3

Sheet C	1	2	3	4	5	6	7	8	9	10	Final
Slovenia (Jurinčič) 🔨	2	0	0	1	0	1	0	1	1	0	6
Spain (Otaegi)	0	2	1	0	4	0	2	0	0	1	10

==== Draw 18 ====
Thursday, October 9, 12:00

Sheet B	1	2	3	4	5	6	7	8	9	10	Final
Croatia (Turkovic)	1	0	0	1	0	2	0	1	0	X	5
Slovakia (Gallova) 🔨	0	1	2	0	2	0	1	0	3	X	9

==== Draw 19 ====
Thursday, October 9, 16:00

Sheet A	1	2	3	4	5	6	7	8	9	10	Final
Spain (Otaegi) 🔨	1	0	0	2	0	0	1	0	0	X	4
Netherlands (Neeleman)	0	1	0	0	0	2	0	3	3	X	9

Sheet C	1	2	3	4	5	6	7	8	9	10	Final
Ireland (Sweeney-Baird) 🔨	0	3	0	0	1	0	2	0	1	0	7
Romania (Colceriu)	1	0	1	1	0	1	0	1	0	1	6

==== Draw 21 ====
Friday, October 10, 8:00

Sheet C	1	2	3	4	5	6	7	8	9	10	Final
Slovakia (Gallova)	0	2	1	0	0	1	3	0	3	X	10
Slovenia (Jurinčič) 🔨	0	0	0	0	1	0	0	2	0	X	3

=== Playoffs ===
Second Place Game
1	Slovakia	4
3	Spain	3

Semifinals
1	Slovakia	5
2	Netherlands	6
3	Spain	8
4	Slovenia	4

==== 1 vs. 2 ====
Friday, October 10, 20:00

Team	1	2	3	4	5	6	7	8	9	10	11	Final
Slovakia (Gallova) 🔨	1	0	0	1	1	0	0	1	0	1	0	5
Netherlands (Neeleman)	0	0	1	0	0	2	0	2	0	0	1	6

Netherlands advances to Group B competitions.
Slovakia advances to Second Place Game.

==== 3 vs. 4 ====
Saturday, October 11, 9:00

Team	1	2	3	4	5	6	7	8	9	10	Final
Spain (Otaegi) 🔨	3	0	0	1	3	0	0	1	0	X	8
Slovenia (Jurinčič)	0	1	1	0	0	0	1	0	1	X	4

Spain advances to Second Place Game.

==== Second Place Game ====
Saturday, October 11, 13:30

Team	1	2	3	4	5	6	7	8	9	10	Final
Slovakia (Gallova) 🔨	0	0	0	2	0	0	0	0	1	1	4
Spain (Otaegi)	0	0	0	0	2	0	0	1	0	0	3

Slovakia advances to Group B competitions.
