= 2014 Glynhill Ladies International =

- Host city: Glasgow, Scotland
- Arena: Braehead Curling Rink
- Dates: 17–19 January
- Winner: (China) Wang Bingyu
- Curling club: Harbin CC, Harbin
- Skip: Wang Bingyu
- Third: Liu Yin
- Second: Yue Qingshuang
- Lead: Zhou Yan
- Alternate: Liu Jinli
- Finalist: (Switzerland) Mirjam Ott

The 2014 Glynhill Ladies International was held from 17 to 19 January at the Braehead Curling Rink in Glasgow, Scotland as part of the 2013–14 World Curling Tour. The event was held in a Round-robin tournament format, and the purse for the event was GBP£8,200, of which the winner, Wang Bingyu, received £2,500. Wang defeated Mirjam Ott in the final, stealing five points en route to a 9–4 victory.

== Teams ==
The teams are listed as follows:

Skip	Third	Second	Lead	Alternate	Locale
Binia Feltscher	Irene Schori	Franziska Kaufmann	Christine Urech		Flims, Switzerland
Hannah Fleming	Lauren Gray	Jennifer Dodds	Alice Spence	Abi Brown	Stirling, Scotland
Vendy Blazkova (fourth)	Fabienne Fürbringer (skip)	Sina Wettstein	Nora Baumann	Fabienne Ubersax	Uitikon, Switzerland
Michèle Jäggi	Marisa Winkelhausen	Stéphanie Jäggi	Melanie Barbezat		Bern, Switzerland
Alina Kovaleva	Julia Portunova	Uliana Vasilyeva	Anastacia Bryzgalova		Moscow, Russia
Anna Kubešková	Tereza Plíšková	Klára Svatoňová	Veronika Herdová	Martina Strnadová	Prague, Czech Republic
Jennifer Martin	Hazel Smith	Vicky Wright	Mhairi Baird		Scotland
Mirjam Ott	Carmen Schäfer	Carmen Küng	Janine Greiner		Davos, Switzerland
Alina Pätz	Nadine Lehmann	Nicole Schwägli	Nicole Dünki		Basel, Switzerland
Anna Sidorova	Margarita Fomina	Aleksandra Saitova	Ekaterina Galkina		Moscow, Russia
Christine Svensen	Isabella Clemmensen	Julie Høgh	Charlotte Clemmensen	Sara Rasmussen	Denmark
Marta Szeliga-Frynia	Magdalena Muskus	Barbara Karwat	Krystyna Beniger		Poland
Silvana Tirinzoni	Marlene Albrecht	Esther Neuenschwander	Manuela Siegrist		Aarau, Switzerland
Wang Bingyu	Liu Yin	Yue Qingshuang	Zhou Yan	Liu Jinli	Harbin, China
Lorna Vevers	Sarah Reid	Rebecca Kesley	Rachel Hannen		Stirling, Scotland
Olga Zharkova	Victorya Moiseeva	Alisa Tregub	Julia Guzieva	Oksana Gertova	Kaliningrad, Russia

== Standings ==
=== Preliminary round ===
Final Standings

Key
Teams to High Road pool

Pool A	W	D	L
(Switzerland) Binia Feltscher	3	0	0
(Switzerland) Fabienne Fürbringer	2	0	1
(Scotland) Jennifer Martin	1	0	2
(Russia) Alina Kovaleva	0	0	3

Pool B	W	D	L
(Switzerland) Silvana Tirinzoni	2	1	0
(China) Wang Bingyu	2	0	1
(Switzerland) Alina Pätz	1	1	1
(Scotland) Hannah Fleming	0	0	3

Pool C	W	D	L
(Russia) Anna Sidorova	3	0	0
(Switzerland) Michèle Jäggi	2	0	1
(Denmark) Christine Svensen	1	0	2
(Poland) Marta Szeliga-Frynia	0	0	3

Pool D	W	D	L
(Switzerland) Mirjam Ott	3	0	0
(Czech Republic) Anna Kubešková	1	0	2
(Scotland) Lorna Vevers	1	0	2
(Russia) Olga Zharkova	1	0	2

=== Schenkel Round ===
Final Standings

Key
Teams to Playoffs

High Road Pool	W	D	L
(Switzerland) Binia Feltscher	5	0	0
(China) Wang Bingyu	4	0	1
(Russia) Anna Sidorova	4	0	1
(Switzerland) Mirjam Ott	3	0	2
(Switzerland) Michèle Jäggi	3	0	2
(Czech Republic) Anna Kubešková	3	0	2
(Switzerland) Silvana Tirinzoni	2	1	2
(Switzerland) Fabienne Fürbringer	2	0	3

Low Road Pool	W	D	L
(Switzerland) Alina Pätz	3	1	1
(Denmark) Christine Svensen	2	0	3
(Russia) Olga Zharkova	2	0	3
(Scotland) Lorna Vevers	2	0	3
(Russia) Alina Kovaleva	1	1	3
(Scotland) Jennifer Martin	1	1	3
(Scotland) Hannah Fleming	1	0	4
(Poland) Marta Szeliga-Frynia	0	0	5

== Playoffs ==
Semifinals
1	(Switzerland) Binia Feltscher	2
4	(Switzerland) Mirjam Ott	5
3	(Russia) Anna Sidorova	5
2	(China) Wang Bingyu	7

Final
4	(Switzerland) Mirjam Ott	4
2	(China) Wang Bingyu	9
