= Isabella Clemmensen =

Danish curler

- Curler ♀
- Born: November 4, 1996 (age 30); Copenhagen, Denmark

Team
- Curling club: Hvidovre CC, Hvidovre

Curling career
- Member Association: Denmark
- World Championship: 3 (2014, 2015, 2016)
- European Championship: 2 (2014, 2015)
- Other appearances: World Junior Championships: 2 (2013, 2014), European Junior Challenge: 2 (2013, 2015)
Medal record
Curling
Danish Women's Championship
Gold medal – first place	2015
Gold medal – first place	2016
European Junior Challenge
Gold medal – first place	2013 Prague

Isabella Clemmensen (born November 4, 1996, in Copenhagen) is a Danish female curler.

At the national level, she is a two-time Danish women's champion (2015, 2016) and a three-time junior champion (2013, 2014, 2015).

== Teams ==
Season	Skip	Third	Second	Lead	Alternate	Coach	Events
2012–13	Stephanie Risdal Nielsen	Jannie Gundry	Isabella Clemmensen	Charlotte Clemmensen	Julie Høgh	Ulrik Schmidt (EJCC); Helena Blach Lavrsen (WJCC)	DJCC 2013 (gold); EJCC 2013 (gold); WJCC 2013 (6th)
2012–13	Stephanie Risdal Nielsen	Jannie Gundry	Chalotte Gundry	Julie Høgh	Isabella Clemmensen		DWCC 2013 (4th)
2013–14	Stephanie Risdal Nielsen	Jannie Gundry	Charlotte Clemmensen	Julie Høgh	Isabella Clemmensen		DWCC 2014 (4th)
2013–14	Christine Svensen	Isabella Clemmensen	Julie Høgh	Charlotte Clemmensen	Sara Rasmussen (WJCC)	Ulrik Schmidt	DJCC 2014 (gold); WJCC 2014 (10th)
2013–14	Madeleine Dupont	Denise Dupont	Christine Svensen	Lina Knudsen	Isabella Clemmensen	Millard Evans	WCC 2014 (10th)
2014–15	Christine Svensen	Isabella Clemmensen	Julie Høgh	Katja Milvang-Jensen	Anna Solberg (EJCC)	Martin Uhd Grønbech	DJCC 2015 (gold); EJCC 2015 (9th)
2014–15	Lene Nielsen	Jeanne Ellegaard	Stephanie Risdal Nielsen	Charlotte Clemmensen	Isabella Clemmensen	Ulrik Schmidt	ECC 2014 (4th); WCC 2015 (8th)
2015–16	Lene Nielsen	Stephanie Risdal	Isabella Clemmensen	Charlotte Clemmensen	Madeleine Dupont	Ulrik Schmidt	ECC 2015 (4th); WCC 2016 (8th)
2015–16	Lene Nielsen	Stephanie Risdal	Charlotte Clemmensen	Isabella Clemmensen			DWCC 2016 (gold)

== Personal life ==
Her older sister Charlotte is also a curler and Isabella's teammate.
