= Charlotte Clemmensen =

Danish female curler

- Curler ♀
- Born: 29 September 1992 (age 34); Copenhagen, Denmark

Team
- Curling club: Hvidovre CC, Hvidovre

Curling career
- Member Association: Denmark
- World Championship: 3 (2015, 2016, 2017)
- European Championship: 3 (2014, 2015, 2016)
- Other appearances: World Junior Championships: 3 (2009, 2013, 2014), European Junior Challenge: 3 (2011, 2012, 2013)
Medal record
Curling
Danish Women's Championship
Gold medal – first place	2016
Gold medal – first place	2017
European Junior Challenge
Gold medal – first place	2013 Prague
Silver medal – second place	2012 Copenhagen

Charlotte T. Clemmensen (born 29 September 1992 in Copenhagen) is a Danish female curler.

At the national level, she is a two-time Danish women's champion (2016, 2017) and a three-time junior champion (2009, 2013, 2014).

== Teams ==
Season	Skip	Third	Second	Lead	Alternate	Coach	Events
2008–09	Mette de Neergaard	Marie de Neergaard	Natasha Hinze Glenstrøm	Charlotte Clemmensen	Christine Svensen (WJCC)	Ole de Neergaard	DJCC 2009 (gold); WJCC 2009 (8th)
2010–11	Stephanie Nielsen	Jannie Gundry	Christine Svensen	Cecilie Hygom	Charlotte Clemmensen	Kirsten Jensen	EJCC 2011 (4th)
2011–12	Stephanie Nielsen	Jannie Gundry	Christine Svensen	Natasha Hinze Glenstrøm	Charlotte Clemmensen	Michael Harry	EJCC 2012 (silver)
2012–13	Stephanie Risdal Nielsen	Jannie Gundry	Isabella Clemmensen	Charlotte Clemmensen	Julie Høgh	Ulrik Schmidt (EJCC); Helena Blach Lavrsen (WJCC)	DJCC 2013 (gold); EJCC 2013 (gold); WJCC 2013 (6th)
2013–14	Stephanie Risdal Nielsen	Jannie Gundry	Charlotte Clemmensen	Julie Høgh	Isabella Clemmensen		DWCC 2014 (4th)
2013–14	Christine Svensen	Isabella Clemmensen	Julie Høgh	Charlotte Clemmensen	Sara Rasmussen (WJCC)	Ulrik Schmidt	DJCC 2014 (gold); WJCC 2014 (10th)
2014–15	Lene Nielsen	Jeanne Ellegaard	Stephanie Risdal Nielsen	Charlotte Clemmensen	Isabella Clemmensen	Ulrik Schmidt	ECC 2014 (4th); WCC 2015 (8th)
2015–16	Lene Nielsen	Stephanie Risdal	Isabella Clemmensen	Charlotte Clemmensen	Madeleine Dupont	Ulrik Schmidt	ECC 2015 (4th); WCC 2016 (8th)
2015–16	Lene Nielsen	Stephanie Risdal	Charlotte Clemmensen	Isabella Clemmensen			DWCC 2016 (gold)
2016–17	Lene Nielsen	Madeleine Dupont	Stephanie Risdal	Charlotte Clemmensen	Denise Dupont	Ulrik Schmidt	ECC 2016 (5th); DWCC 2017 (gold); WCC 2017 (12th)

== Personal life ==
Her younger sister Isabella is also a curler and Charlotte's teammate.
