= Ivana Bratic =

Danish curler

- Curler

Team
- Curling club: Tårnby CC
- Skip: Angelina Jensen
- Third: Christine Grønbech
- Second: Camilla Jensen
- Lead: Lina Knudsen
- Alternate: Ivana Bratic

Curling career
- World Championship: 2 (2010, 2018)
Medal record
World Junior Curling Championships
Bronze medal – third place	2007 Eveleth

Ivana Bratic (born 26 September 1988 in Bosnia and Herzegovina, Yugoslavia) is a Danish curler from Hørsholm.

She was alternate for the Danish team at the 2010 Ford World Women's Curling Championship in Swift Current, Canada.

== Personal life ==
Bratic works as a nurse. She has a boyfriend and two daughters.
