= 2012 European Junior Curling Challenge =

- Host city: Copenhagen, Denmark
- Arena: Tårnby Curling Club
- Dates: January 3–8
- Men's winner: Italy
- Skip: Andrea Pilzer
- Third: Amos Mosaner
- Second: Daniele Ferrazza
- Lead: Roberto Arman
- Alternate: Sebastiano Arman
- Finalist: Russia (Evgeny Arkhipov)
- Women's winner: Italy
- Skip: Federica Apollonio
- Third: Giada Mosaner
- Second: Chiara Zanotelli
- Lead: Stefania Menardi
- Alternate: Anastasia Mosca
- Finalist: Denmark (Stephanie Nielsen)

The 2012 European Junior Curling Challenge was held from January 3 to 8 at the Tårnby Curling Club in Copenhagen, Denmark. The challenge consisted of nations that have not already qualified for the World Junior Championships. The winners of the men's and women's tournaments qualified for the 2012 World Junior Curling Championships in Östersund, Sweden.

== Men ==
=== Teams ===
The teams are listed as follows:

Country	Skip	Third	Second	Lead	Alternate
Austria	Sebastian Wunderer	Mathias Genner	Martin Reichel	Lukas Kirchmair	
Denmark	Tobias Thune	Asmus Jørgensen	Thor Fehrenkamp	Fabian Thune	Oliver Søe
England	Ben Fowler	Harry Mallows	Ben Alexander	Oliver Kendall	Conor Simpson
Estonia	Harri Lill	Eduard Jakovlev	Robert-Kent Päll	Sander Rouk	
France	Jules Minarie Pagnier	Louis Pizon	Bastien Minarie Pagnier	Loic Walleau	Johann Rousseau
Germany	Andy Büttner	Kai Duschanek	Moritz Nickel	Marcel Köllner	Kevin Lehmann
Hungary	Peter Palancsa	Kristof Czermann	Domonkos Ferenci	David Balazs	Viktor Rohmann
Italy	Andrea Pilzer	Amos Mosaner	Daniele Ferrazza	Roberto Arman	Sebastiano Arman
Latvia	Arvis Bušmanis	Rolands Ǧērmanis	Andris Bremanis	Jānis Bremanis	Artūrs Gerhards
Netherlands	Diedrick Bontebal	Floyd Koelewijn	Laurens Hoekman	Wouter Gosgens	Ezra Wiebe
Poland	Rafal Sypien	Jakub Chec	Olaf Sypien	Konrad Stych	Mateusz Machecki
Russia	Evgeny Arkhipov	Sergey Glukhov	Timur Gadzhikhanov	Artur Ali	Dmitry Mironov
Slovakia	David Misun	Juraj Matuskovic	Milan Moravcik	Patrik Kapralik	
Slovenia	Gašper Uršič	Jure Čulić	Jošt Lajovec	Lovro Kolbl	
Spain	Sergio Vez Labrador	Angel Garcia Aguirrezabal	Adrian Manero Vicente	Carlos Vega Blanco	Mario Fernandez Rodriguez

=== Round-robin standings ===
Final round-robin standings

Key
Teams to Playoffs
Teams to Tiebreaker

Group A	Skip	W	L
Russia	Evgeny Arkhipov	6	0
Netherlands	Diedrick Bontebal	4	2
Denmark	Tobias Thune	4	2
England	Ben Fowler	3	3
Austria	Sebastian Wunderer	3	3
Poland	Rafal Sypien	1	5
Latvia	Arvis Bušmanis	0	6

Group B	Skip	W	L
Italy	Andrea Pilzer	7	0
Estonia	Harri Lill	6	1
Germany	Andy Büttner	5	2
Spain	Sergio Vez Labrador	4	3
France	Jules Minarie Pagnier	3	4
Slovakia	David Misun	2	5
Slovenia	Gašper Uršič	1	6
Hungary	Peter Palancsa	0	7

=== Round-robin results ===
All draw times are listed in Central European Time (UTC+01).

==== Group A ====
===== Draw 1 =====
Wednesday, January 4, 12:30

Sheet E	1	2	3	4	5	6	7	8	Final
Netherlands (Bontebal) 🔨	0	2	2	3	0	0	0	1	8
Austria (Wunderer)	3	0	0	0	0	1	1	0	5

Sheet F	1	2	3	4	5	6	7	8	Final
England (Fowler)	0	0	0	0	0	1	0	X	1
Russia (Arkhipov) 🔨	0	0	0	1	3	0	1	X	5

Sheet G	1	2	3	4	5	6	7	8	Final
Latvia (Bušmanis)	1	0	1	0	1	1	0	X	4
Poland (Sypien) 🔨	0	1	0	2	0	0	6	X	9

===== Draw 2 =====
Wednesday, January 4, 19:30

Sheet A	1	2	3	4	5	6	7	8	Final
Russia (Arkhipov) 🔨	1	0	0	1	1	3	0	X	6
Latvia (Bušmanis)	0	1	1	0	0	0	1	X	3

Sheet B	1	2	3	4	5	6	7	8	Final
Poland (Sypien)	0	1	0	0	0	0	X	X	1
Netherlands (Bontebal) 🔨	3	0	4	1	2	1	X	X	10

Sheet C	1	2	3	4	5	6	7	8	Final
Austria (Wunderer) 🔨	2	0	1	0	2	0	3	X	8
Denmark (Thune)	0	1	0	0	0	1	0	X	2

===== Draw 3 =====
Thursday, January 5, 12:30

Sheet A	1	2	3	4	5	6	7	8	Final
Denmark (Thune) 🔨	3	0	2	0	0	4	X	X	9
Poland (Sypien)	0	1	0	1	1	0	X	X	3

Sheet D	1	2	3	4	5	6	7	8	Final
Latvia (Bušmanis) 🔨	2	1	0	0	0	1	0	X	4
England (Fowler)	0	0	2	1	1	0	3	X	7

Sheet G	1	2	3	4	5	6	7	8	Final
Netherlands (Bontebal)	0	0	0	0	1	0	0	X	1
Russia (Arkhipov) 🔨	1	0	0	3	0	0	1	X	5

===== Draw 4 =====
Thursday, January 5, 19:30

Sheet C	1	2	3	4	5	6	7	8	Final
England (Fowler)	1	0	1	0	4	0	0	0	6
Netherlands (Bontebal) 🔨	0	1	0	3	0	1	1	1	7

Sheet D	1	2	3	4	5	6	7	8	Final
Poland (Sypien)	0	1	0	0	2	0	X	X	3
Austria (Wunderer)	4	0	4	1	0	1	X	X	10

Sheet E	1	2	3	4	5	6	7	8	Final
Russia (Arkhipov)	1	0	3	0	0	0	1	X	5
Denmark (Thune) 🔨	0	1	0	0	1	1	0	X	3

===== Draw 5 =====
Friday, January 6, 12:30

Sheet A	1	2	3	4	5	6	7	8	Final
England (Fowler) 🔨	0	0	1	0	0	0	1	X	2
Denmark (Thune)	0	0	0	1	2	2	0	X	5

Sheet B	1	2	3	4	5	6	7	8	Final
Austria (Wunderer) 🔨	1	0	1	0	1	0	0	X	3
Russia (Arkhipov)	0	1	0	3	0	2	1	X	7

Sheet F	1	2	3	4	5	6	7	8	9	Final
Netherlands (Bontebal) 🔨	1	0	1	0	2	0	1	0	1	6
Latvia (Bušmanis)	0	1	0	2	0	1	0	1	0	5

===== Draw 6 =====
Friday, January 6, 19:30

Sheet B	1	2	3	4	5	6	7	8	Final
Denmark (Thune) 🔨	1	1	0	2	0	3	1	X	8
Latvia (Bušmanis)	0	0	1	0	2	0	0	X	3

Sheet C	1	2	3	4	5	6	7	8	Final
Russia (Arkhipov) 🔨	2	0	1	0	2	2	0	X	7
Poland (Sypien)	0	1	0	1	0	0	1	X	3

Sheet E	1	2	3	4	5	6	7	8	Final
Austria (Wunderer) 🔨	1	0	0	2	0	0	2	0	5
England (Fowler)	0	2	0	0	2	1	0	2	7

===== Draw 7 =====
Saturday, January 7, 12:30

Sheet A	1	2	3	4	5	6	7	8	Final
Latvia (Bušmanis)	0	0	0	0	2	1	0	X	3
Austria (Wunderer) 🔨	2	2	4	1	0	0	1	X	10

Sheet D	1	2	3	4	5	6	7	8	Final
Denmark (Thune) 🔨	0	2	0	4	0	0	0	X	6
Netherlands (Bontebal)	0	0	0	0	1	2	0	X	3

Sheet F	1	2	3	4	5	6	7	8	Final
Poland (Sypien) 🔨	1	0	1	0	0	0	0	X	2
England (Fowler)	0	1	0	0	2	1	1	X	5

==== Group B ====
===== Draw 1 =====
Wednesday, January 4, 12:30

Sheet A	1	2	3	4	5	6	7	8	Final
Italy (Pilzer) 🔨	0	1	3	0	1	2	0	X	7
Hungary (Palancsa)	0	0	0	1	0	0	1	X	2

Sheet B	1	2	3	4	5	6	7	8	9	Final
Estonia (Lill)	0	0	0	1	2	1	0	1	1	6
Slovakia (Misun) 🔨	0	2	1	0	0	0	2	0	0	5

Sheet C	1	2	3	4	5	6	7	8	Final
Spain (Vez Labrador) 🔨	0	6	1	0	0	2	X	X	9
Slovenia (Uršič)	0	0	0	1	1	0	X	X	2

Sheet D	1	2	3	4	5	6	7	8	Final
France (Minarie Pagnier) 🔨	0	0	1	1	0	1	0	X	3
Germany (Büttner)	1	3	0	0	2	0	2	X	8

===== Draw 2 =====
Wednesday, January 4, 19:30

Sheet D	1	2	3	4	5	6	7	8	Final
Spain (Vez Labrador)	0	2	2	1	1	0	X	X	6
Slovakia (Misun) 🔨	2	0	0	0	0	0	X	X	2

Sheet E	1	2	3	4	5	6	7	8	Final
France (Minarie Pagnier) 🔨	1	0	0	0	1	0	1	0	3
Italy (Pilzer)	0	2	1	1	0	2	0	1	7

Sheet F	1	2	3	4	5	6	7	8	Final
Hungary (Palancsa)	0	0	3	0	0	0	X	X	3
Germany (Büttner) 🔨	3	2	0	0	3	3	X	X	11

Sheet G	1	2	3	4	5	6	7	8	Final
Estonia (Lill) 🔨	1	0	3	0	0	3	3	X	10
Slovenia (Uršič)	0	1	0	1	1	0	0	X	3

===== Draw 3 =====
Thursday, January 5, 12:30

Sheet B	1	2	3	4	5	6	7	8	Final
Slovenia (Uršič)	0	0	0	0	2	0	X	X	2
Germany (Büttner) 🔨	2	2	1	1	0	3	X	X	9

Sheet C	1	2	3	4	5	6	7	8	Final
Slovakia (Misun) 🔨	1	0	0	0	0	0	X	X	1
Italy (Pilzer)	0	0	2	3	1	2	X	X	8

Sheet E	1	2	3	4	5	6	7	8	Final
Spain (Vez Labrador)	2	0	2	0	1	0	0	0	5
Hungary (Palancsa) 🔨	0	1	0	1	0	1	0	1	4

Sheet F	1	2	3	4	5	6	7	8	9	Final
Estonia (Lill) 🔨	1	0	0	2	0	2	0	1	1	7
France (Minarie Pagnier)	0	2	1	0	2	0	1	0	0	6

===== Draw 4 =====
Thursday, January 5, 19:30

Sheet A	1	2	3	4	5	6	7	8	Final
Estonia (Lill)	0	0	1	0	0	2	1	1	5
Spain (Vez Labrador) 🔨	0	1	0	0	2	0	0	0	3

Sheet B	1	2	3	4	5	6	7	8	Final
Hungary (Palancsa)	0	0	0	0	4	0	X	X	4
France (Minarie Pagnier) 🔨	1	4	2	1	0	4	X	X	12

Sheet F	1	2	3	4	5	6	7	8	Final
Slovenia (Uršič) 🔨	0	0	0	1	0	0	0	X	1
Slovakia (Misun)	1	1	1	0	0	0	2	X	5

Sheet G	1	2	3	4	5	6	7	8	Final
Germany (Büttner)	0	1	0	1	1	0	1	X	4
Italy (Pilzer) 🔨	2	0	4	0	0	1	0	X	7

===== Draw 5 =====
Friday, January 6, 12:30

Sheet C	1	2	3	4	5	6	7	8	Final
Hungary (Palancsa)	0	0	1	0	3	0	X	X	4
Estonia (Lill) 🔨	4	1	0	1	0	3	X	X	9

Sheet D	1	2	3	4	5	6	7	8	Final
Italy (Pilzer)	0	2	0	3	0	0	1	X	6
Slovenia (Uršič) 🔨	1	0	1	0	1	0	0	X	3

Sheet E	1	2	3	4	5	6	7	8	Final
Slovakia (Misun)	0	2	0	0	0	1	0	X	3
Germany (Büttner) 🔨	2	0	2	0	1	0	4	X	9

Sheet G	1	2	3	4	5	6	7	8	Final
France (Minarie Pagnier)	0	0	0	1	0	0	X	X	1
Spain (Vez Labrador) 🔨	2	2	2	0	2	2	X	X	10

===== Draw 6 =====
Friday, January 6, 19:30

Sheet A	1	2	3	4	5	6	7	8	Final
Slovenia (Uršič)	0	1	0	1	1	0	2	X	5
France (Minarie Pagnier)	1	0	3	0	0	3	0	X	7

Sheet D	1	2	3	4	5	6	7	8	Final
Germany (Büttner)	0	2	0	0	0	0	0	X	2
Estonia (Lill) 🔨	1	0	3	1	0	1	1	X	7

Sheet F	1	2	3	4	5	6	7	8	Final
Italy (Pilzer) 🔨	0	2	0	2	0	0	3	X	7
Spain (Vez Labrador)	0	0	1	0	1	0	0	X	2

Sheet G	1	2	3	4	5	6	7	8	Final
Slovakia (Misun) 🔨	1	0	1	1	0	1	6	X	10
Hungary (Palancsa)	0	1	0	0	2	0	0	X	3

===== Draw 7 =====
Saturday, January 7, 12:30

Sheet B	1	2	3	4	5	6	7	8	Final
Germany (Büttner) 🔨	2	1	2	0	0	2	0	X	7
Spain (Vez Labrador)	0	0	0	2	1	0	1	X	4

Sheet C	1	2	3	4	5	6	7	8	Final
France (Minarie Pagnier)	1	1	0	5	0	0	1	X	8
Slovakia (Misun) 🔨	0	0	1	0	1	1	0	X	3

Sheet E	1	2	3	4	5	6	7	8	9	Final
Hungary (Palancsa)	0	0	2	0	1	0	1	2	0	6
Slovenia (Uršič) 🔨	2	2	0	1	0	1	0	0	1	7

Sheet G	1	2	3	4	5	6	7	8	Final
Italy (Pilzer)	0	2	0	0	0	1	1	2	6
Estonia (Lill) 🔨	1	0	1	2	0	0	0	0	4

=== Tiebreaker ===
Saturday, January 7, 19:30

Team	1	2	3	4	5	6	7	8	Final
Denmark (Thune) 🔨	0	2	0	2	0	0	1	0	5
Netherlands (Bontebal)	0	0	2	0	2	1	0	1	6

=== Playoffs ===
Semifinals
A1	Russia	8
B2	Estonia	4
A2	Netherlands	2
B1	Italy	6

Final
A1	Russia	2
B1	Italy	3

==== Semifinals ====
Sunday, January 8, 10:00

Sheet 1	1	2	3	4	5	6	7	8	Final
Russia (Arkhipov) 🔨	1	2	1	0	4	0	0	X	8
Estonia (Lill)	0	0	0	2	0	2	0	X	4

Sheet 4	1	2	3	4	5	6	7	8	Final
Netherlands (Bontebal) 🔨	0	0	1	0	1	0	0	X	2
Italy (Pilzer)	0	2	0	1	0	2	1	X	6

==== Final ====
Sunday, January 8, 15:00

Sheet 2	1	2	3	4	5	6	7	8	Final
Russia (Arkhipov)	0	1	0	0	0	1	0	0	2
Italy (Pilzer) 🔨	1	0	0	1	0	0	0	1	3

== Women ==
=== Teams ===
The teams are listed as follows:

Country	Skip	Third	Second	Lead	Alternate
Denmark	Stephanie Nielsen	Jannie Gundry	Christine Svensen	Natacha Glenstrøm	Charlotte Clemmensen
England	Anna Fowler	Hetty Garnier	Naomi Robinson	Lauren Pearce	Lucy Sparks
Estonia	Helen Nummert	Marie Turmann	Liisa Turmann	Gerli Roosme	Kerli Zirk
Germany	Aylin Lutz	Frederike Manner	Nicole Muskatewitz	Claudia Beer	Lisa-Marie Ritter
Hungary	Zsanett Gunzinam (fourth)	Dorottya Palancsa (skip)	Vera Kalocsai	Henrietta Miklai	Timea Nagy
Italy	Federica Apollonio	Giada Mosaner	Chiara Zanotelli	Stefania Menardi	Anastasia Mosca
Poland	Elzbieta Ran	Magdalena Dumanowska	Dominika Lasak	Dominika Muskus	Zuzanna Rybicka
Slovakia	Silvia Sykorova	Daniela Matulova	Dominika Nitkova	Monika Kristofcakova	Terezia Hubackova
Spain	Irantzu Garcia Vez	Iera Irazusta Manterola	Irene Santiago Calvillo	Elena Altuna Lopez	Patricia Arbues Espinosa

=== Round-robin standings ===
Final round-robin standings

Country	Skip	W	L
Italy	Federica Apollonio	8	0
England	Anna Fowler	6	2
Denmark	Stephanie Nielsen	6	2
Estonia	Helen Nummert	5	3
Slovakia	Silvia Sykorova	3	5
Hungary	Dorottya Palancsa	3	5
Poland	Elzbieta Ran	2	6
Spain	Irantzu Garcia Vez	2	6
Germany	Aylin Lutz	1	7

=== Round-robin results ===
All draw times are listed in Central European Time (UTC+01).

==== Draw 1 ====
Tuesday, January 3, 19:30

Sheet A	1	2	3	4	5	6	7	8	Final
England (Fowler) 🔨	0	0	1	0	3	2	0	X	6
Spain (Garcia Vez)	1	0	0	0	0	0	2	X	3

Sheet B	1	2	3	4	5	6	7	8	Final
Denmark (Nielsen)	1	1	1	1	0	1	0	X	5
Estonia (Nummert) 🔨	0	0	0	0	1	0	3	X	4

Sheet C	1	2	3	4	5	6	7	8	9	Final
Germany (Lutz)	0	0	0	1	1	0	1	0	0	3
Slovakia (Sykorova) 🔨	0	1	0	0	0	1	0	1	1	4

Sheet D	1	2	3	4	5	6	7	8	9	Final
Hungary (Palancsa) 🔨	0	2	0	0	1	0	0	2	1	6
Poland (Ran)	1	0	0	1	0	3	0	0	0	5

==== Draw 2 ====
Wednesday, January 4, 9:00

Sheet A	1	2	3	4	5	6	7	8	Final
Poland (Ran)	0	0	1	0	0	2	1	X	4
Estonia (Nummert) 🔨	2	2	0	1	2	0	0	X	7

Sheet B	1	2	3	4	5	6	7	8	Final
Slovakia (Sykorova)	0	1	0	0	1	0	X	X	2
Italy (Apollonio) 🔨	2	0	3	1	0	4	X	X	10

Sheet C	1	2	3	4	5	6	7	8	Final
England (Fowler)	0	2	1	0	2	2	2	X	9
Hungary (Palancsa) 🔨	2	0	0	2	0	0	0	X	4

Sheet D	1	2	3	4	5	6	7	8	Final
Germany (Lutz) 🔨	0	0	1	0	0	0	1	X	2
Denmark (Nielsen)	1	2	0	3	1	0	0	X	7

==== Draw 3 ====
Wednesday, January 4, 16:00

Sheet A	1	2	3	4	5	6	7	8	Final
Hungary (Palancsa)	0	0	2	0	2	0	X	X	4
Denmark (Nielsen) 🔨	4	2	0	2	0	4	X	X	12

Sheet B	1	2	3	4	5	6	7	8	Final
Spain (Garcia Vez) 🔨	1	1	0	1	0	2	0	1	6
Poland (Ran)	0	0	2	0	1	0	1	0	4

Sheet C	1	2	3	4	5	6	7	8	Final
Estonia (Nummert)	0	0	0	2	0	2	0	X	4
Italy (Apollonio) 🔨	1	1	1	0	3	0	3	X	9

Sheet D	1	2	3	4	5	6	7	8	Final
Slovakia (Sykorova)	1	0	0	1	0	0	0	X	2
England (Fowler) 🔨	0	0	1	0	3	1	1	X	6

==== Draw 4 ====
Thursday, January 5, 9:00

Sheet A	1	2	3	4	5	6	7	8	Final
Italy (Apollonio)	1	0	0	0	0	2	0	1	4
England (Fowler) 🔨	0	1	0	0	0	0	2	0	3

Sheet B	1	2	3	4	5	6	7	8	Final
Germany (Lutz)	0	1	1	0	2	0	0	X	4
Hungary (Palancsa) 🔨	1	0	0	2	0	2	1	X	6

Sheet C	1	2	3	4	5	6	7	8	Final
Denmark (Nielsen) 🔨	0	0	2	2	1	0	2	X	7
Poland (Ran)	0	0	0	0	0	1	0	X	1

Sheet D	1	2	3	4	5	6	7	8	Final
Spain (Garcia Vez) 🔨	1	0	0	1	0	0	1	1	4
Estonia (Nummert)	0	0	1	0	2	0	0	0	3

==== Draw 5 ====
Thursday, January 5, 16:00

Sheet A	1	2	3	4	5	6	7	8	Final
Estonia (Nummert)	0	1	1	0	3	1	1	X	7
Germany (Lutz) 🔨	0	0	0	4	0	0	0	X	4

Sheet B	1	2	3	4	5	6	7	8	Final
England (Fowler)	0	0	2	0	0	2	1	X	5
Denmark (Nielsen) 🔨	0	1	0	0	1	0	0	X	2

Sheet C	1	2	3	4	5	6	7	8	Final
Slovakia (Sykorova) 🔨	4	0	0	0	1	2	0	1	8
Spain (Garcia Vez)	0	2	1	1	0	0	2	0	6

Sheet D	1	2	3	4	5	6	7	8	Final
Poland (Ran) 🔨	0	1	0	0	0	1	0	X	2
Italy (Apollonio)	1	0	1	1	1	0	1	X	5

==== Draw 6 ====
Friday, January 6, 9:00

Sheet A	1	2	3	4	5	6	7	8	Final
Denmark (Nielsen) 🔨	2	0	4	0	1	0	5	X	12
Slovakia (Sykorova)	0	2	0	0	0	1	0	X	3

Sheet B	1	2	3	4	5	6	7	8	Final
Italy (Apollonio) 🔨	3	2	0	0	3	1	X	X	9
Spain (Garcia Vez)	0	0	1	0	0	0	X	X	1

Sheet C	1	2	3	4	5	6	7	8	Final
Hungary (Palancsa) 🔨	0	0	0	2	0	1	0	X	3
Estonia (Nummert)	1	0	1	0	4	0	3	X	9

Sheet D	1	2	3	4	5	6	7	8	Final
England (Fowler)	3	0	1	2	0	0	0	2	8
Germany (Lutz) 🔨	0	2	0	0	1	1	2	0	6

==== Draw 7 ====
Friday, January 6, 16:00

Sheet A	1	2	3	4	5	6	7	8	Final
Spain (Garcia Vez) 🔨	1	0	0	2	0	0	0	0	3
Hungary (Palancsa)	0	1	1	0	1	0	1	2	6

Sheet B	1	2	3	4	5	6	7	8	Final
Poland (Ran)	2	0	0	2	0	2	0	1	7
Germany (Lutz) 🔨	0	0	1	0	1	0	2	0	4

Sheet C	1	2	3	4	5	6	7	8	Final
Italy (Apollonio) 🔨	1	1	0	1	0	0	1	0	4
Denmark (Nielsen)	0	0	1	0	0	1	0	1	3

Sheet D	1	2	3	4	5	6	7	8	9	Final
Estonia (Nummert)	1	1	0	2	0	0	1	0	1	6
Slovakia (Sykorova) 🔨	0	0	1	0	1	1	0	2	0	5

==== Draw 8 ====
Saturday, January 7, 9:00

Sheet A	1	2	3	4	5	6	7	8	Final
Germany (Lutz) 🔨	1	0	0	0	0	0	0	X	1
Italy (Apollonio)	0	3	0	1	1	0	1	X	6

Sheet B	1	2	3	4	5	6	7	8	Final
Hungary (Palancsa) 🔨	1	0	0	0	0	0	X	X	1
Slovakia (Sykorova)	0	1	4	1	3	1	X	X	10

Sheet C	1	2	3	4	5	6	7	8	Final
Poland (Ran)	0	0	0	0	2	1	2	0	5
England (Fowler) 🔨	0	0	2	2	0	0	0	2	6

Sheet D	1	2	3	4	5	6	7	8	Final
Denmark (Nielsen) 🔨	2	0	0	2	0	2	0	1	7
Spain (Garcia Vez)	0	2	0	0	1	0	1	0	4

==== Draw 9 ====
Saturday, January 7, 16:00

Sheet A	1	2	3	4	5	6	7	8	Final
Slovakia (Sykorova) 🔨	1	0	0	3	1	0	0	0	5
Poland (Ran)	0	1	1	0	0	1	2	3	8

Sheet B	1	2	3	4	5	6	7	8	Final
Estonia (Nummert) 🔨	2	4	0	0	0	2	0	X	8
England (Fowler)	0	0	1	0	1	0	1	X	3

Sheet C	1	2	3	4	5	6	7	8	Final
Spain (Garcia Vez) 🔨	2	0	1	0	0	1	1	0	5
Germany (Lutz)	0	2	0	2	1	0	0	1	6

Sheet D	1	2	3	4	5	6	7	8	Final
Italy (Apollonio) 🔨	1	2	0	2	0	1	1	X	7
Hungary (Palancsa)	0	0	1	0	0	0	0	X	1

=== Playoffs ===
Semifinals			Final
			1	Italy	5
2	England	1	3	Denmark	2
3	Denmark	3

==== Semifinal ====
Sunday, January 8, 10:00

Sheet 3	1	2	3	4	5	6	7	8	Final
England (Fowler) 🔨	0	1	0	0	0	0	0	X	1
Denmark (Nielsen)	0	0	1	0	0	2	0	X	3

==== Final ====
Sunday, January 8, 15:00

Team	1	2	3	4	5	6	7	8	9	Final
Italy (Apollonio) 🔨	0	1	0	0	0	0	0	1	3	5
Denmark (Nielsen)	0	0	0	2	0	0	0	0	0	2
