= 2013 European Junior Curling Challenge =

- Host city: Prague, Czech Republic
- Arena: Curling Hall Roztyly
- Dates: January 3–8
- Men's winner: Italy
- Skip: Andrea Pilzer
- Third: Amos Mosaner
- Second: Daniele Ferrazza
- Lead: Roberto Arman
- Alternate: Sebastiano Arman
- Finalist: Denmark (Tobias Thune)
- Women's winner: Denmark
- Skip: Stephanie Risdal Nielsen
- Third: Jannie Gundry
- Second: Catrine Edelskov
- Lead: Isabella Clemmensen
- Alternate: Julie Høgh
- Finalist: Hungary (Dorottya Palancsa)

The 2013 European Junior Curling Challenge was held from January 3 to 8 at the Curling Hall Roztyly in Prague, Czech Republic. Nations in the Europe zone that have not already qualified for the World Junior Curling Championships participated in the curling challenge. The top finishers of each tournament will advance to the 2013 World Junior Curling Championships in Sochi, Russia. In the men's tournament, Italy regained a spot in the World Junior Championships after a last place finish at last year's worlds with a win over Denmark. In the women's tournament, Denmark won a spot in the World Junior Championships with a win over Hungary.

== Men ==
=== Teams ===
The teams are listed as follows:

Country	Skip	Third	Second	Lead	Alternate
Austria	Sebastian Wunderer	Mathias Genner	Martin Reichel	Lukas Kirchmair	Philipp Nothegger
Denmark	Tobias Thune	Asmus Jørgensen	Thor Fehrenkamp	Fabian Thune	Oliver Søe
England	Ben Fowler	Oliver Kendall	Conor Simpson	Cormac Barry	Renz Bunag
Estonia	Harri Lill	Robert-Kent Päll	Sander Rőuk	Georgi Komarov	Eiko-Siim Peips
France	Rodolphe Vincent	Jules Minarie-Pagnier	Tom Berrin	Louis Gaddi	Gaspard Delobel
Germany	Merlin Litke	Marc Bastian	Dorian Zahn	Leon Hundertmark	Marcel Krüger
Hungary	Kristóf Czermann	Dávid Balázs	Péter Palancsa	Richárd Hafenscher	Zoltán Pünkösti
Italy	Andrea Pilzer	Amos Mosaner	Daniele Ferrazza	Roberto Arman	Sebastiano Arman
Latvia	Arvis Bušmanis	Rolands Gērmanis	Andris Bremanis	Artūrs Gerhards	Jānis Bremanis
Netherlands	Floyd Koelewijn	Laurens Hoekman	Daan van der Vooren	Wouter Gösgens	
Poland	Rafal Sypien	Tomasz Bosek	Konrad Stych	Tomasz Pluta	Krzysztof Niewinski
Slovenia	Gašper Uršič	Jure Čulić	Jošt Lajovec	Lovro Kolbl	
Turkey	Alican Karataş	Nuh Nar	Melik Senol	Adem Özdemir	Burak Korucu

=== Round-robin standings ===
Final round-robin standings

Key
Teams to Playoffs
Teams to Tiebreakers

Group A	Skip	W	L
Denmark	Tobias Thune	6	0
Italy	Andrea Pilzer	4	2
Turkey	Alican Karataş	4	2
Germany	Merlin Litke	3	3
Hungary	Kristóf Czermann	3	3
France	Rodolphe Vincent	1	5
Poland	Rafal Sypien	0	6

Group B	Skip	W	L
Netherlands	Floyd Koelewijn	4	1
Austria	Sebastian Wunderer	4	1
Estonia	Harri Lill	4	1
Slovenia	Gašper Uršič	2	3
England	Ben Fowler	1	4
Latvia	Arvis Bušmanis	0	5

=== Round-robin results ===
All draw times are listed in Central European Time (UTC+1).

==== Group A ====
===== Draw 1 =====
Thursday, January 3, 19:00

Sheet A	1	2	3	4	5	6	7	8	Final
Italy (Pilzer)	2	0	3	1	0	0	0	X	6
Hungary (Czermann) 🔨	0	0	0	0	2	1	1	X	4

Sheet B	1	2	3	4	5	6	7	8	Final
Germany (Litke) 🔨	2	2	0	0	1	0	1	X	6
Poland (Sypien)	0	0	1	1	0	1	0	X	3

Sheet C	1	2	3	4	5	6	7	8	Final
Denmark (Thune)	0	3	0	0	0	0	1	X	4
France (Vincent) 🔨	0	0	0	0	1	1	0	X	2

===== Draw 2 =====
Friday, January 4, 12:30

Sheet A	1	2	3	4	5	6	7	8	Final
France (Vincent) 🔨	0	0	3	1	0	0	1	1	6
Poland (Sypien)	1	1	0	0	1	1	0	0	4

Sheet C	1	2	3	4	5	6	7	8	Final
Hungary (Czermann)	0	2	1	0	0	3	0	X	6
Turkey (Karataş) 🔨	2	0	0	3	2	0	3	X	10

Sheet D	1	2	3	4	5	6	7	8	9	Final
Italy (Pilzer) 🔨	0	2	0	1	0	0	0	2	0	5
Denmark (Thune)	1	0	1	0	0	3	0	0	1	6

===== Draw 3 =====
Friday, January 4, 19:30

Sheet B	1	2	3	4	5	6	7	8	Final
Italy (Pilzer) 🔨	3	1	1	0	2	1	0	X	7
Germany (Litke)	0	0	3	2	0	4	0	X	9

===== Draw 4 =====
Saturday, January 5, 12:30

Sheet A	1	2	3	4	5	6	7	8	Final
Denmark (Thune) 🔨	0	0	2	2	0	2	X	X	6
Turkey (Karataş)	0	0	0	0	1	0	X	X	1

Sheet D	1	2	3	4	5	6	7	8	Final
Germany (Litke) 🔨	2	0	2	0	0	1	2	X	7
France (Vincent)	0	1	0	0	1	0	0	X	2

===== Draw 5 =====
Saturday, January 5, 19:30

Sheet B	1	2	3	4	5	6	7	8	Final
Denmark (Thune) 🔨	0	2	0	0	2	0	0	3	7
Hungary (Czermann)	0	0	0	1	0	3	0	0	4

Sheet C	1	2	3	4	5	6	7	8	Final
Poland (Sypien) 🔨	2	1	0	0	1	0	0	1	5
Italy (Pilzer)	0	0	2	1	0	3	0	0	6

===== Draw 6 =====
Sunday, January 6, 9:00

Sheet A	1	2	3	4	5	6	7	8	Final
Hungary (Czermann) 🔨	0	2	1	1	1	0	0	X	5
Germany (Litke)	0	0	0	0	0	1	1	X	2

Sheet D	1	2	3	4	5	6	7	8	Final
Poland (Sypien)	0	3	0	1	0	1	0	1	6
Turkey (Karataş) 🔨	3	0	1	0	2	0	2	0	8

===== Draw 7 =====
Sunday, January 6, 16:00

Sheet B	1	2	3	4	5	6	7	8	Final
Poland (Sypien) 🔨	0	0	1	0	1	0	X	X	2
Denmark (Thune)	1	4	0	2	0	0	X	X	7

Sheet C	1	2	3	4	5	6	7	8	9	Final
Turkey (Karataş) 🔨	0	1	2	0	1	0	1	0	1	6
Germany (Litke)	1	0	0	2	0	1	0	1	0	5

Sheet D	1	2	3	4	5	6	7	8	Final
France (Vincent)	0	0	0	0	1	0	X	X	1
Italy (Pilzer) 🔨	2	2	1	1	0	1	X	X	7

===== Draw 8 =====
Monday, January 7, 9:00

Sheet A	1	2	3	4	5	6	7	8	Final
Germany (Litke) 🔨	0	1	0	0	1	0	X	X	2
Denmark (Thune)	1	0	1	1	0	4	X	X	7

Sheet B	1	2	3	4	5	6	7	8	9	Final
Turkey (Karataş) 🔨	0	0	0	2	0	0	0	2	1	5
France (Vincent)	0	2	1	0	0	1	0	0	0	4

Sheet D	1	2	3	4	5	6	7	8	Final
Hungary (Czermann) 🔨	3	0	1	1	0	1	2	0	8
Poland (Sypien)	0	4	0	0	2	0	0	1	7

===== Draw 9 =====
Monday, January 7, 16:00

Sheet A	1	2	3	4	5	6	7	8	Final
Turkey (Karataş)	0	0	0	2	0	1	0	X	3
Italy (Pilzer) 🔨	1	1	1	0	1	0	1	X	5

Sheet C	1	2	3	4	5	6	7	8	Final
France (Vincent) 🔨	2	0	0	0	2	0	1	0	5
Hungary (Czermann)	0	1	0	1	0	1	0	3	6

==== Group B ====
===== Draw 1 =====
Thursday, January 3, 19:00

Sheet D	1	2	3	4	5	6	7	8	Final
Netherlands (Koelewijn) 🔨	2	0	2	0	4	0	1	X	9
Latvia (Bušmanis)	0	1	0	1	0	1	0	X	3

===== Draw 2 =====
Friday, January 4, 12:30

Sheet B	1	2	3	4	5	6	7	8	Final
Estonia (Lill)	1	1	1	1	1	0	1	X	6
Slovenia (Uršič) 🔨	0	0	0	0	0	1	0	X	1

===== Draw 3 =====
Friday, January 4, 19:30

Sheet A	1	2	3	4	5	6	7	8	Final
Slovenia (Uršič)	0	0	3	0	0	1	X	X	4
Netherlands (Koelewijn) 🔨	3	4	0	2	3	0	X	X	12

Sheet C	1	2	3	4	5	6	7	8	Final
Estonia (Lill)	1	0	2	2	1	0	2	X	8
Latvia (Bušmanis) 🔨	0	1	0	0	0	2	0	X	3

Sheet D	1	2	3	4	5	6	7	8	Final
England (Fowler)	0	0	0	0	1	0	1	X	2
Austria (Wunderer) 🔨	2	0	1	1	0	2	0	X	6

===== Draw 4 =====
Saturday, January 5, 12:30

Sheet B	1	2	3	4	5	6	7	8	Final
Netherlands (Koelewijn)	0	0	2	0	3	1	0	0	6
Austria (Wunderer) 🔨	2	2	0	2	0	0	1	1	8

Sheet C	1	2	3	4	5	6	7	8	Final
Slovenia (Uršič)	0	0	0	2	2	1	0	X	5
England (Fowler) 🔨	0	1	1	0	0	0	1	X	3

===== Draw 5 =====
Saturday, January 5, 19:30

Sheet A	1	2	3	4	5	6	7	8	Final
Latvia (Bušmanis) 🔨	0	0	0	2	1	0	0	X	3
Austria (Wunderer)	1	1	1	0	0	5	0	X	8

Sheet D	1	2	3	4	5	6	7	8	Final
Estonia (Lill)	0	1	0	1	0	4	1	X	7
England (Fowler) 🔨	1	0	1	0	1	0	0	X	3

===== Draw 6 =====
Sunday, January 6, 9:00

Sheet B	1	2	3	4	5	6	7	8	Final
England (Fowler) 🔨	1	0	4	1	1	0	0	0	7
Latvia (Bušmanis)	0	1	0	0	0	2	2	1	6

Sheet C	1	2	3	4	5	6	7	8	Final
Netherlands (Koelewijn) 🔨	1	0	2	0	0	1	1	1	6
Estonia (Lill)	0	3	0	1	1	0	0	0	5

===== Draw 7 =====
Sunday, January 6, 16:00

Sheet A	1	2	3	4	5	6	7	8	Final
Austria (Wunderer)	0	0	2	0	1	0	3	X	6
Slovenia (Uršič) 🔨	0	0	0	1	0	3	0	X	4

===== Draw 8 =====
Monday, January 7, 9:00

Sheet C	1	2	3	4	5	6	7	8	Final
England (Fowler) 🔨	0	0	3	3	0	0	0	0	6
Netherlands (Koelewijn)	1	1	0	0	2	1	1	1	7

===== Draw 9 =====
Monday, January 7, 16:00

Sheet B	1	2	3	4	5	6	7	8	Final
Austria (Wunderer) 🔨	1	0	1	1	0	0	1	0	4
Estonia (Lill)	0	1	0	0	1	1	0	2	5

Sheet D	1	2	3	4	5	6	7	8	Final
Latvia (Bušmanis)	0	0	1	0	0	1	0	X	2
Slovenia (Uršič) 🔨	3	0	0	2	3	0	0	X	8

=== Tiebreakers ===
Tuesday, January 8, 8:00

Sheet B	1	2	3	4	5	6	7	8	Final
Italy (Pilzer) 🔨	0	0	3	1	0	3	X	X	7
Turkey (Karataş)	0	1	0	0	1	0	X	X	2

Sheet D	1	2	3	4	5	6	7	8	9	Final
Estonia (Lill) 🔨	1	0	1	0	2	1	0	0	1	6
Austria (Wunderer)	0	1	0	2	0	0	1	1	0	5

=== Playoffs ===
Semifinals
A1	Denmark	7
B2	Estonia	5
B1	Netherlands	4
A2	Italy	5

Final
A1	Denmark	6
A2	Italy	7

==== Semifinals ====
Tuesday, January 8, 11:30

Sheet B	1	2	3	4	5	6	7	8	Final
Denmark (Thune)	0	0	0	0	2	2	0	3	7
Estonia (Lill) 🔨	1	0	0	0	0	0	4	0	5

Sheet C	1	2	3	4	5	6	7	8	Final
Netherlands (Koelewijn) 🔨	0	1	0	1	0	0	2	0	4
Italy (Pilzer)	1	0	1	0	2	0	0	1	5

==== Final ====
Tuesday, January 8, 15:30

Sheet A	1	2	3	4	5	6	7	8	Final
Denmark (Thune) 🔨	0	3	0	0	2	0	1	0	6
Italy (Pilzer)	0	0	2	2	0	2	0	1	7

== Women ==
=== Teams ===
The teams are listed as follows:

Country	Skip	Third	Second	Lead	Alternate
Denmark	Stephanie Risdal Nielsen	Jannie Gundry	Catrine Edelskov	Isabella Clemmensen	Julie Høgh
England	Hetty Garnier	Angharad Ward	Naomi Robinson	Lucy Sparks	Niamh Fenton
Estonia	Marie Turmann	Kerli Zirk	Kerli Laidsalu	Kädi Kurem	Johanna Ehatamm
Finland	Emmi Lindroos	Tuuli Rissanen	Pinja Rissanen	Salla Soini	Mira Lehtonen
Germany	Aylin Lutz	Frederike Manner	Nicole Muskatewitz	Claudia Beer	Maike Beer
Hungary	Dorottya Palancsa	Henrietta Miklai	Ágnes Szentannai	Timea Nagy	Vera Kalocsai
Italy	Veronica Zappone	Sara Levetti	Elisa Patono	Arianna Losano	Denise Pimpini
Latvia	Elizabete Laiviņa (fourth)	Una Kristiāna Ozoliņa (skip)	Tīna Siliņa	Santa Blumberga	Laura Gaidule
Poland	Marta Pluta	Marta Malinowska	Julia Malinowska	Ewa Stych	Joanna Benet
Slovakia	Silvia Sýkorová	Daniela Matulová	Dominika Nitková	Terézia Hubáčková	Monika Krištofčáková
Slovenia	Lana Žnidarič (fourth)	Brina Meze Petrič (skip)	Gaja Plazl	Daša Debeljak	Živa Žnidarič
Turkey	Dilşat Yıldız	Semiha Konuksever	Burcak Sehitoglu	Zeynep Özmen	Burcu Korucu

=== Round-robin standings ===
As of Draw 7

Key
Teams to Playoffs

Group A	Skip	W	L
Germany	Aylin Lutz	5	0
Italy	Veronica Zappone	4	1
Estonia	Marie Turmann	3	2
Slovakia	Silvia Sýkorová	2	3
Slovenia	Brina Meze Petrič	1	4
Finland	Emmi Lindroos	0	5

Group B	Skip	W	L
Denmark	Stephanie Risdal Nielsen	4	1
Hungary	Dorottya Palancsa	4	1
England	Hetty Garnier	3	2
Turkey	Dilşat Yıldız	3	2
Poland	Marta Pluta	1	4
Latvia	Una Kristiāna Ozoliņa	0	5

=== Round-robin results ===
All draw times listed in Central European Time (UTC+1).

==== Group A ====
===== Draw 1 =====
Friday, January 4, 9:00

Sheet A	1	2	3	4	5	6	7	8	Final
Estonia (Turmann) 🔨	0	3	0	2	0	0	1	2	8
Slovakia (Sýkorová)	1	0	3	0	1	2	0	0	7

Sheet B	1	2	3	4	5	6	7	8	Final
Slovenia (Petrič) 🔨	0	0	1	0	0	1	0	X	2
Italy (Zappone)	1	1	0	3	3	0	4	X	12

Sheet C	1	2	3	4	5	6	7	8	Final
Germany (Lutz) 🔨	4	0	2	1	2	1	0	X	10
Finland (Lindroos)	0	1	0	0	0	0	2	X	3

===== Draw 3 =====
Saturday, January 5, 9:00

Sheet A	1	2	3	4	5	6	7	8	Final
Germany (Lutz)	0	0	1	1	2	0	4	X	8
Slovakia (Sýkorová) 🔨	0	0	0	0	0	2	0	X	2

Sheet C	1	2	3	4	5	6	7	8	Final
Slovenia (Petrič)	0	0	1	2	0	3	2	X	8
Finland (Lindroos) 🔨	3	1	0	0	1	0	0	X	5

===== Draw 4 =====
Saturday, January 5, 16:00

Sheet D	1	2	3	4	5	6	7	8	Final
Italy (Zappone)	0	2	0	1	1	2	3	X	9
Estonia (Turmann) 🔨	1	0	1	0	0	0	0	X	2

===== Draw 5 =====
Sunday, January 6, 12:30

Sheet B	1	2	3	4	5	6	7	8	Final
Estonia (Turmann) 🔨	2	0	1	2	0	1	0	X	6
Finland (Lindroos)	0	0	0	0	1	0	1	X	2

Sheet C	1	2	3	4	5	6	7	8	Final
Slovakia (Sýkorová)	0	1	1	0	0	0	X	X	2
Italy (Zappone) 🔨	2	0	0	2	3	1	X	X	8

===== Draw 6 =====
Sunday, January 6, 19:30

Sheet A	1	2	3	4	5	6	7	8	Final
Finland (Lindroos)	0	1	1	0	0	0	2	X	4
Italy (Zappone) 🔨	3	0	0	3	2	1	0	X	9

Sheet D	1	2	3	4	5	6	7	8	Final
Germany (Lutz) 🔨	2	4	2	4	1	0	X	X	13
Slovenia (Petrič)	0	0	0	0	0	1	X	X	1

===== Draw 7 =====
Monday, January 7, 12:30

Sheet A	1	2	3	4	5	6	7	8	Final
Italy (Zappone) 🔨	0	1	0	0	1	1	1	0	4
Germany (Lutz)	0	0	3	2	0	0	0	1	6

Sheet C	1	2	3	4	5	6	7	8	Final
Slovenia (Petrič)	0	2	0	0	0	0	X	X	2
Estonia (Turmann) 🔨	4	0	1	1	2	1	X	X	9

Sheet D	1	2	3	4	5	6	7	8	Final
Finland (Lindroos)	0	0	0	0	0	2	X	X	2
Slovakia (Sýkorová) 🔨	1	2	3	1	2	0	X	X	9

===== Draw 8 =====
Monday, January 7, 19:30

Sheet A	1	2	3	4	5	6	7	8	Final
Slovakia (Sýkorová)	1	0	3	0	0	1	0	3	8
Slovenia (Petrič)	0	2	0	3	1	0	1	0	7

Sheet D	1	2	3	4	5	6	7	8	Final
Estonia (Turmann)	0	3	0	0	1	0	0	X	4
Germany (Lutz)	1	0	1	2	0	1	3	X	8

==== Group B ====
===== Draw 1 =====
Friday, January 4, 9:00

Sheet D	1	2	3	4	5	6	7	8	Final
Poland (Pluta)	2	0	1	0	0	1	0	X	4
Hungary (Palancsa) 🔨	0	1	0	2	1	0	4	X	8

===== Draw 2 =====
Friday, January 4, 16:00

Sheet A	1	2	3	4	5	6	7	8	Final
England (Garnier)	0	0	0	2	0	1	0	0	3
Hungary (Palancsa) 🔨	0	0	1	0	1	0	1	1	4

Sheet C	1	2	3	4	5	6	7	8	Final
Poland (Pluta) 🔨	3	1	1	0	1	1	0	X	7
Latvia (Ozoliņa)	0	0	0	1	0	0	2	X	3

Sheet D	1	2	3	4	5	6	7	8	Final
Turkey (Yıldız)	0	0	0	2	2	0	0	X	4
Denmark (Nielsen) 🔨	2	0	1	0	0	2	3	X	8

===== Draw 3 =====
Saturday, January 5, 9:00

Sheet A	1	2	3	4	5	6	7	8	Final
Turkey (Yıldız)	3	1	1	0	0	1	0	3	9
Latvia (Ozoliņa) 🔨	0	0	0	5	0	0	1	0	6

Sheet C	1	2	3	4	5	6	7	8	Final
England (Garnier)	0	0	1	0	0	2	0	2	5
Denmark (Nielsen) 🔨	0	1	0	0	1	0	1	0	3

===== Draw 4 =====
Saturday, January 5, 16:00

Sheet A	1	2	3	4	5	6	7	8	Final
Latvia (Ozoliņa)	0	0	0	0	1	0	X	X	1
Denmark (Nielsen) 🔨	4	4	4	2	0	3	X	X	17

Sheet B	1	2	3	4	5	6	7	8	Final
England (Garnier)	3	0	2	0	4	1	0	X	10
Poland (Pluta) 🔨	0	1	0	1	0	0	1	X	3

Sheet C	1	2	3	4	5	6	7	8	Final
Hungary (Palancsa)	0	1	1	2	0	2	0	1	7
Turkey (Yıldız) 🔨	1	0	0	0	1	0	1	0	3

===== Draw 5 =====
Sunday, January 6, 12:30

Sheet A	1	2	3	4	5	6	7	8	9	Final
Poland (Pluta) 🔨	1	0	1	0	1	0	0	3	0	6
Turkey (Yıldız)	0	1	0	2	0	1	2	0	2	8

Sheet D	1	2	3	4	5	6	7	8	Final
Latvia (Ozoliņa)	0	0	2	1	0	0	0	1	4
England (Garnier) 🔨	2	1	0	0	1	1	1	0	6

===== Draw 6 =====
Sunday, January 6, 19:30

Sheet B	1	2	3	4	5	6	7	8	9	Final
Denmark (Nielsen) 🔨	0	0	1	1	1	1	0	0	1	5
Hungary (Palancsa)	1	0	0	0	0	0	1	2	0	4

===== Draw 7 =====
Monday, January 7, 12:30

Sheet B	1	2	3	4	5	6	7	8	9	Final
Turkey (Yıldız)	1	1	0	0	3	0	1	0	1	6
England (Garnier) 🔨	0	0	1	1	0	0	0	2	0	3

===== Draw 8 =====
Monday, January 7, 19:30

Sheet B	1	2	3	4	5	6	7	8	Final
Hungary (Palancsa)	0	1	2	1	3	1	0	X	8
Latvia (Ozoliņa)	3	0	0	0	0	0	0	X	3

Sheet C	1	2	3	4	5	6	7	8	Final
Denmark (Nielsen)	0	2	0	2	1	0	4	X	9
Poland (Pluta)	2	0	1	0	0	1	0	X	4

=== Playoffs ===
Semifinals
A1	Germany	4
B2	Hungary	7
A2	Italy	3
B1	Denmark	8

Final
B2	Hungary	1
B1	Denmark	4

==== Semifinals ====
Tuesday, January 8, 11:30

Sheet A	1	2	3	4	5	6	7	8	Final
Germany (Lutz)	0	0	2	0	0	0	2	X	4
Hungary (Palancsa) 🔨	1	2	0	1	0	3	0	X	7

Sheet D	1	2	3	4	5	6	7	8	Final
Italy (Zappone)	0	0	2	0	1	0	0	X	3
Denmark (Nielsen) 🔨	2	0	0	2	0	3	1	X	8

==== Final ====
Tuesday, January 8, 15:30

Sheet C	1	2	3	4	5	6	7	8	Final
Hungary (Palancsa)	0	0	0	0	1	0	0	X	1
Denmark (Nielsen) 🔨	0	0	0	1	0	2	1	X	4
