= Angelina Jensen =

Danish curler

Angelina Camilla Jensen
- Curler
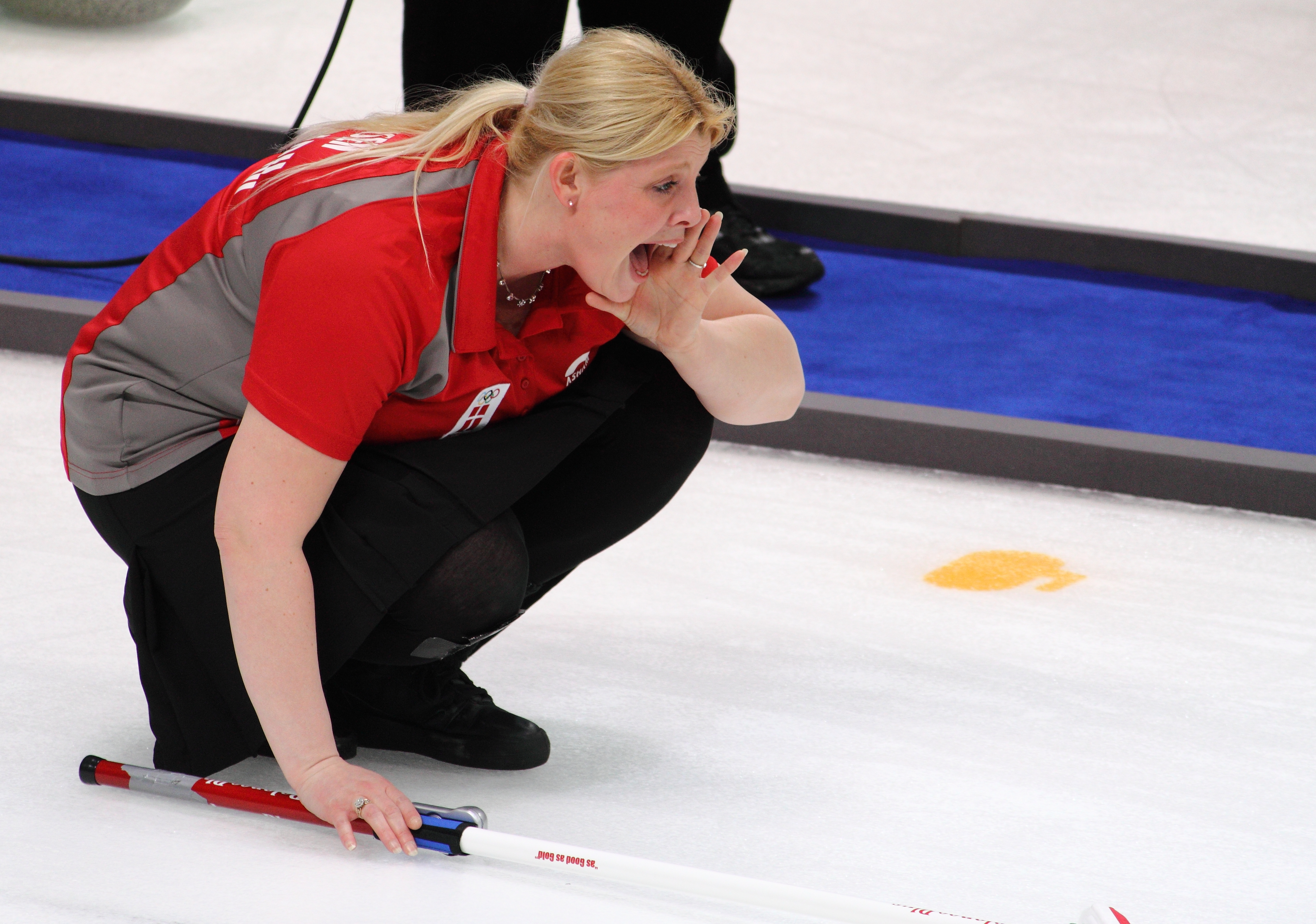
- Born: 23 May 1973 (age 53); Copenhagen, Denmark

Team
- Curling club: Tårnby CC, Tårnby
- Skip: Angelina Jensen
- Third: Christine Grønbech
- Second: Camilla Jensen
- Lead: Lina Knudsen
- Alternate: Ivana Bratic

Curling career
- World Championship: 7 (1994, 2006, 2007, 2008, 2009, 2010, 2018)
- European Championship: 4 (1993, 2006, 2008, 2009)
Medal record
Representing Denmark
World Curling Championships
Silver medal – second place	2007 Aomori
Bronze medal – third place	2009 Gangneung
World Junior Curling Championships
Bronze medal – third place	1993 Grindelwald
Bronze medal – third place	1994 Sofia
European Curling Championships
Bronze medal – third place	2008 Örnsköldsvik
Bronze medal – third place	2009 Aberdeen

Angelina Camilla Jensen (born 23 May 1973) is a Danish curler from Kastrup.

Jensen has won two bronze medals in six attempts at the World Junior Curling Championships. She won her first bronze in 1993 playing third for Dorthe Holm and won bronze again in 1994 skipping. She had also played on the Danish team at the 1989, 1990, 1991 and 1992 Junior Championships.

Jensen played in her first World Curling Championship in 1994 throwing third stones for Helena Blach Lavrsen. Denmark finished 9th that year. Jensen would not return to the Worlds again until 2006, when she threw lead rocks but also skipped. Denmark finished in sixth place. At the 2007 World Women's Curling Championship, Jensen threw second rocks and skipped, and won her first medal at the Worlds- a silver when she lost 8–4 to Canada (skipped by Kelly Scott) in the final.

Jensen and her team represented Denmark again at the World Championships in 2008 finishing 7-4 for 5th Place losing a Tiebreaker to Japan, 2009 winning a bronze medal by defeating Canada's Jennifer Jones and 2010 going 6–5, But losing the Danish Final in 2011 and 2012

== Personal life ==
Jensen works as an insurance claims correspondent for Alka Insurance. She has one daughter, Karolina.

== Teammates ==
2010 Vancouver Olympic Games

Madeleine Dupont, Fourth

Denise Dupont, Third

Camilla Jensen, Lead

Ane Hansen, Alternate
