= Ane Håkansson Hansen =

Danish curler (born 1975)

Medal record

World Curling Championships
Silver medal – second place	2007 Aomori	
Bronze medal – third place	2009 Gangneung	

European Curling Championships
Bronze medal – third place	2008 Örnsköldsvik	
Bronze medal – third place	2009 Aberdeen	

Ane Håkansson Hansen (born 3 October 1975) is an internationally elite curler from Denmark. She has an MSc in biology and is currently a PhD student in Exercise and Sport Sciences at the University of Copenhagen.

She made her World Championship debut in 2007 as the Alternate for Angelina Jensen's Danish team. She would return for the 2008 World Championships and the 2009 World Championships in the same position.

She will compete at the 2010 Vancouver Olympics as the Alternate for Team Denmark.

== Teammates ==
2009 Gangneung World Championships

2010 Vancouver Olympic Games

- Denise Dupont, Fourth
- Madeleine Dupont, Third
- Angelina Jensen, Skip
- Camilla Jensen, Lead
