= 2015 European Junior Curling Challenge =

- Host city: Prague, Czech Republic
- Arena: Curling Hall Roztyly
- Dates: January 3–9
- Men's winner: Russia
- Skip: Artur Ali
- Third: Timur Gadzhikhanov
- Second: Alexandr Kuzmin
- Lead: Panteleimon Lappo
- Alternate: Mikhail Vaskov
- Finalist: Spain (Sergio Vez Labrador)
- Women's winner: England
- Skip: Hetty Garnier
- Third: Angharad Ward
- Second: Naomi Robinson
- Lead: Lucy Sparks
- Alternate: Niamh Fenton
- Finalist: Turkey (Dilşat Yıldız)

The 2015 European Junior Curling Challenge was held from January 3 to 9 at the Curling Hall Roztyly in Prague, Czech Republic. Nations in the Europe zone that have not already qualified for the World Junior Curling Championships participated in the curling challenge. The top finishers of each tournament advanced to the 2015 World Junior Curling Championships in Tallinn, Estonia.

== Men ==
=== Round-robin standings ===
Final round-robin standings

Key
Teams to Playoffs

Group A	Skip	W	L
Russia	Artur Ali	5	0
Germany	Marc Muskatewitz	4	1
Spain	Sergio Vez Labrador	3	2
England	Ben Fowler	2	3
Poland	Michal Janowski	1	4
Romania	Cristian Matau	0	5

Group B	Skip	W	L
Austria	Sebastian Wunderer	5	0
Turkey	Enes Taskesen	4	1
Denmark	Tobias Thune Jacobsen	3	2
Lithuania	Gelmis Valdavicius	1	4
Hungary	Botond Kovacs	1	4
Slovenia	Stefan Sever	1	4

Group C	Skip	W	L
Czech Republic	Krystof Krupansky	5	0
Netherlands	Wouter Gösgens	4	1
Latvia	Janis Bremanis	3	2
France	Theo Ducroz	2	3
Slovakia	Jakub Polak	1	4
Finland	Melker Lundberg	0	5

=== Playoffs ===
Quarterfinals
A1	Russia	10
C3	Latvia	1
A2	Germany	3
B2	Turkey	7
A3	Spain	5
C1	Czech Republic	4
B1	Austria	5
C2	Netherlands	3

Semifinals
A1	Russia	10
B2	Turkey	3
A3	Spain	10
B1	Austria	4

Gold-medal game
A1	Russia	4
A3	Spain	3

Bronze-medal game
B1	Austria	5
B2	Turkey	8

==== Quarterfinals ====
Thursday, January 8, 16:30

Sheet A	1	2	3	4	5	6	7	8	Final
Czech Republic (Krupansky)	0	0	1	0	0	2	1	0	4
Spain (Vez Labrador) 🔨	0	0	0	3	1	0	0	1	5

Sheet B	1	2	3	4	5	6	7	8	Final
Austria (Wunderer)	1	0	3	0	0	1	0	0	5
Netherlands (Gösgens) 🔨	0	1	0	0	1	0	1	1	4

Sheet D	1	2	3	4	5	6	7	8	Final
Germany (Muskatewitz)	0	2	0	0	0	1	0	X	3
Turkey (Taskesen) 🔨	1	0	0	1	2	0	3	X	7

Sheet E	1	2	3	4	5	6	7	8	Final
Russia (Ali)	1	0	3	3	3	0	X	X	10
Latvia (Bremanis) 🔨	0	1	0	0	0	0	X	X	1

==== Semifinals ====
Friday, January 9, 9:00

Sheet A	1	2	3	4	5	6	7	8	Final
Russia (Ali) 🔨	4	0	1	3	2	0	X	X	10
Turkey (Taskesen)	0	1	0	0	0	2	X	X	3

Sheet C	1	2	3	4	5	6	7	8	Final
Spain (Vez Labrador) 🔨	0	2	2	0	3	0	3	X	10
Austria (Wunderer)	2	0	0	2	0	0	0	X	4

==== Bronze-medal game ====
Friday, January 9, 14:30

Sheet D	1	2	3	4	5	6	7	8	Final
Austria (Wunderer)	0	1	0	2	0	2	0	0	5
Turkey (Taskesen) 🔨	2	0	2	0	2	0	1	1	8

==== Gold-medal game ====
Friday, January 9, 14:30

Sheet B	1	2	3	4	5	6	7	8	Final
Russia (Ali)	0	2	1	0	0	1	0	0	4
Spain (Vez Labrador) 🔨	1	0	0	1	0	0	1	0	3

== Women ==
=== Round-robin standings ===
Final round-robin standings

Key
Teams to Playoffs

Group A	Skip	W	L
England	Hetty Garnier	5	1
Turkey	Dilşat Yıldız	4	2
Poland	Marta Pluta	4	2
Italy	Elisa Charlotte Patono	3	3
Slovakia	Silvia Sykorova	3	3
Slovenia	Nina Kremzar	2	4
Spain	Aroa Amilibia Gonzalez	0	6

Group B	Skip	W	L
Norway	Maia Ramsfjell	5	1
Hungary	Dorottya Palansca	5	1
Germany	Emira Abbes	4	2
Latvia	Santa Blumberga	3	3
Denmark	Christine Svensen	3	3
Finland	Mira Lehtonen	1	5
Romania	Iulia Ioana Traila	0	6

=== Playoffs ===
Quarterfinals
A2	Turkey	6
B3	Germany	2
B1	Norway	5
A4	Italy	6
A1	England	7
B4	Latvia	1
B2	Hungary	8
A3	Poland	2

Semifinals
A2	Turkey	6
A4	Italy	2
A1	England	6
B2	Hungary	5

Gold-medal game
A2	Turkey	1
A1	England	9

Bronze-medal game
B2	Hungary	7
A4	Italy	4

==== Quarterfinals ====
Thursday, January 8, 20:00

Sheet A	1	2	3	4	5	6	7	8	Final
Germany (Abbes) 🔨	0	0	0	2	0	0	0	X	2
Turkey (Yıldız)	0	1	1	0	2	1	1	X	6

Sheet B	1	2	3	4	5	6	7	8	Final
England (Garnier) 🔨	0	1	0	2	1	2	1	X	7
Latvia (Blumberga)	1	0	0	0	0	0	0	X	1

Sheet D	1	2	3	4	5	6	7	8	Final
Poland (Pluta) 🔨	1	0	0	1	0	0	0	X	2
Hungary (Palansca)	0	1	1	0	2	2	2	X	8

Sheet E	1	2	3	4	5	6	7	8	Final
Italy (Patrono) 🔨	0	3	1	1	0	1	0	0	6
Norway (Ramsejell)	1	0	0	0	2	0	1	1	5

==== Semifinals ====
Friday, January 9, 9:00

Sheet A	1	2	3	4	5	6	7	8	Final
Turkey (Yıldız)	0	0	2	0	1	3	0	X	6
Italy (Patrono) 🔨	0	2	0	0	0	0	0	X	2

Sheet C	1	2	3	4	5	6	7	8	Final
England (Garnier)	0	0	1	3	0	1	0	1	6
Hungary (Palansca) 🔨	0	1	0	0	1	0	3	0	5

==== Bronze-medal game ====
Friday, January 9, 14:30

Sheet A	1	2	3	4	5	6	7	8	Final
Hungary (Palansca)	0	2	0	1	3	0	1	X	7
Italy (Patrono)	2	0	1	0	0	1	0	X	4

==== Gold-medal game ====
Friday, January 9, 14:30

Sheet C	1	2	3	4	5	6	7	8	Final
Turkey (Yıldız)	0	0	1	0	0	0	X	X	1
England (Garnier) 🔨	3	0	0	3	2	1	X	X	9
