= Curling at the 2009 European Youth Olympic Winter Festival =

- Venue: Bielsko-Biała curling arena, Bielsko-Biała
- Date: 16–20 February

Curling at the 2009 European Youth Olympic Winter Festival was held from 16 to 20 February 2009. It was held in Bielsko-Biała, Poland.

== Results ==
=== Medal table ===
2009 European Youth Olympic Festival
Rank	Nation	Gold	Silver	Bronze	Total
1	Great Britain (GBR)	1	1	0	2
1	Switzerland (SUI)	1	1	0	2
3	Denmark (DEN)	0	0	1	1
3	Norway (NOR)	0	0	1	1
Totals (4 entries)		2	2	2	6

=== Medalists ===
Event	Gold	Silver	Bronze
Boys Team	Team Switzerland; Switzerland	Team Great Britain; Great Britain	Team Norway; Norway
Girls Team	Team Great Britain; Great Britain	Team Switzerland; Switzerland	Team Denmark; Denmark
