= Camilla Jensen =

Danish curler (born 1982)

Medal record

World Curling Championships
Silver medal – second place	2007 Aomori	
Bronze medal – third place	2009 Gangneung	

European Curling Championships
Bronze medal – third place	2008 Örnsköldsvik	
Bronze medal – third place	2009 Aberdeen	

European Mixed Curling Championship
Silver medal – second place	2007 Madrid	
Silver medal – second place	2009 Prague	

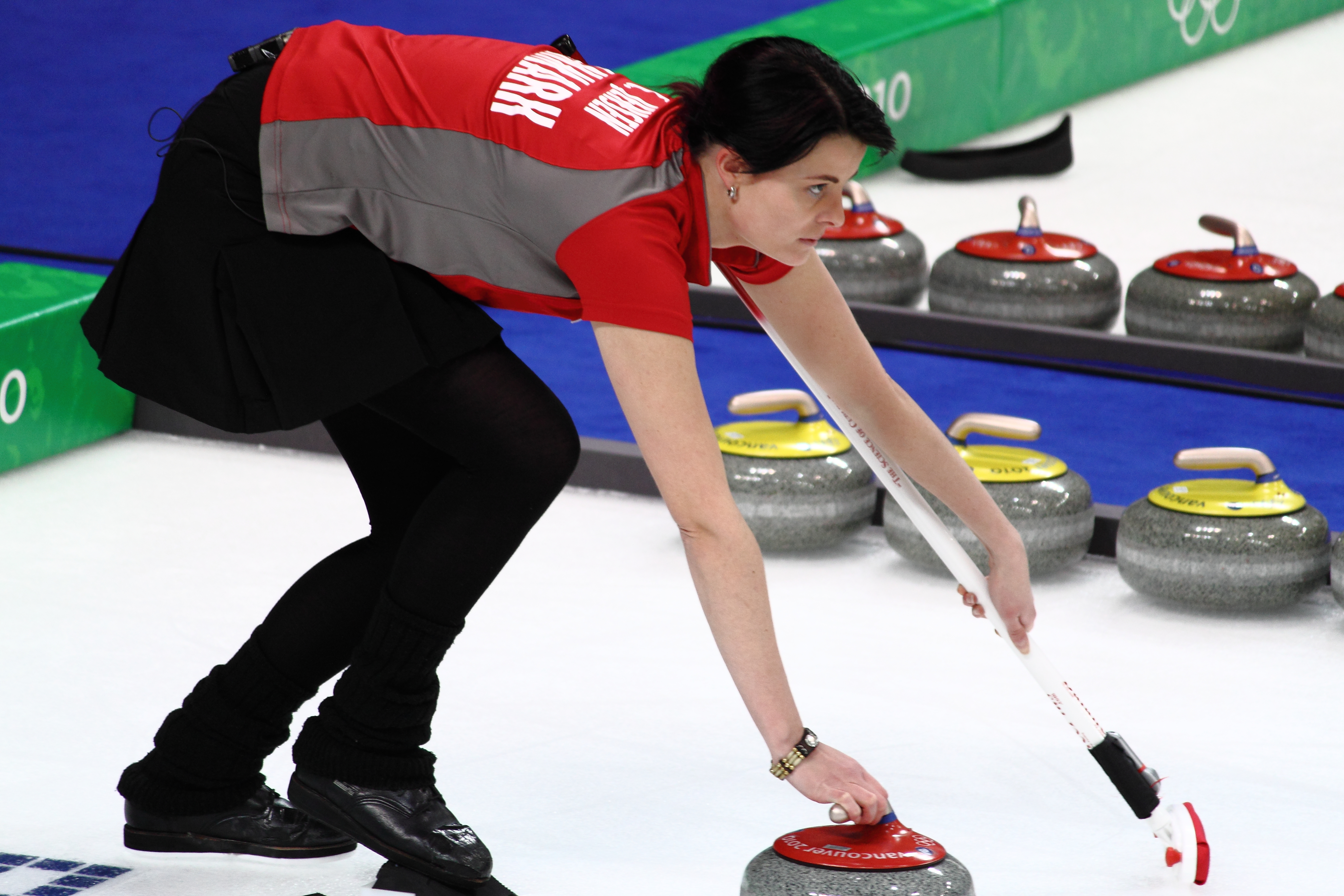
Camilla Jensen at the 2010 Olympics

Camilla Louise Skaarberg Jensen (born 25 October 1982 in Copenhagen) is a Danish curler. She currently plays on a team skipped by sister Angelina Jensen.

Jensen was a member of the Danish team that won a silver medal at the 2007 World Women's Curling Championship. Later that year, she won a silver medal at the 2007 European Mixed Curling Championship playing third for Joel Ostrowski. She won another silver medal at the 2009 European Mixed Curling Championship with Ostrowski.

== Personal life ==
Jensen works as a course administrator in technical education, lives in Tårnby/ Copenhagen and has a son and a daughter

== Teammates ==
- 2007 Aomori World Championships - Madeleine Dupont, fourth
- 2008 Vernon World Championships - Denise Dupont, third
- 2009 Gangneung World Championships - Angelina Jensen, skip
- 2010 Vancouver Olympic Games - Ane Hansen, alternate
