= Andrea Pilzer =

Italian curler

- Curler
- Born: 27 August 1991 (age 35)

Team
- Curling club: AC Cembra, Cembra, ITA

Curling career
- Member Association: Italy
- World Championship: 3 (2015, 2017, 2018)
- World Mixed Doubles Championship: 1 (2009)
- European Championship: 5 (2013, 2014, 2015, 2016, 2017)
- Olympic: 1 (2018)

Andrea Pilzer (born 27 August 1991 in Trento) is an Italian curler from Cembra. He competed at the 2015 Ford World Men's Curling Championship in Halifax, Nova Scotia, Canada, as lead for the Italian team.

== Personal life ==
Pilzer is currently a student
