= Mette de Neergaard =

Danish curler

- Curler
- Born: 6 November 1991 (age 35)

Team
- Curling club: Hvidovre CC, Hvidovre
- Skip: Lene Nielsen
- Third: Helle Simonsen
- Second: Jeanne Ellegaard
- Lead: Maria Poulsen
- Alternate: Mette de Neergaard

Mette de Neergaard (born 6 November 1991 in Copenhagen) is a Danish curler. She is currently the alternate player on the Lene Nielsen rink which will represent Denmark at the 2014 Winter Olympics.
