= Danish Women's Curling Championship =

National curling championship

The Danish Women's Curling Championship is the national championship of women's curling in Denmark. It has been held annually since 1979.

== List of champions ==
Year	Skip	Club
1979	Iben Larsen	HCC (Hvidovre)
1980	Marianne Jørgensen	HCC
1981	Marianne Jørgensen	HCC
1982	Marianne Jørgensen	HCC
1983	Jane Bidstrup	HCC
1984	Jane Bidstrup	HCC
1985	Helena Blach	HCC
1986	Helena Blach	HCC
1987	Helena Blach	HCC
1988	Helena Blach	HCC
1989	Marianne Qvist	GCC (Gentofte)
1990	Helena Blach	HCC
1991	Helena Blach	HCC
1992	Helena Blach	HCC
1993	Marianne Qvist	GCC (Gentofte)
1994	Helena Blach	TCC (Tårnby)
1995	Helena Blach Lavrsen	HCC
1996	Helena Blach Lavrsen	HCC
1997	Helena Blach Lavrsen	HCC
1998	Helena Blach Lavrsen	HCC
1999	Lene Bidstrup	HCC
2000	Lene Bidstrup	HCC
2001	Lene Bidstrup	HCC
2002	Lene Bidstrup	HCC
2003	Dorthe Holm	HCC
2004	Angelina Jensen	TCC
2005	Madeleine Dupont	HCC
2006	Angelina Jensen	TCC
2007	Angelina Jensen	TCC
2008	Angelina Jensen	TCC
2009	Angelina Jensen	TCC
2010	Lene Nielsen	HCC
2011	Lene Nielsen	HCC
2012	Lene Nielsen	HCC
2013	Lene Nielsen	HCC
2014	Madeleine Dupont	HCC
2015	Lene Nielsen	HCC
2016	Lene Nielsen	HCC
2017	Lene Nielsen	HCC
2018	Angelina Jensen	TCC
2019	Madeleine Dupont	HCC
2020	Mathilde Halse	HCC/GCC
2021	Cancelled	
2022	Madeleine Dupont	HCC
2023	Madeleine Dupont	HCC
2024	Madeleine Dupont	HCC/GCC
2025	Madeleine Dupont	HCC
2026	Madeleine Dupont	HCC

== See also ==
- Danish Men's Curling Championship
- Danish Mixed Curling Championship
- Danish Mixed Doubles Curling Championship
- Danish Junior Curling Championships
- Danish Senior Curling Championships
