= Lina Almind Knudsen =

Danish curler

Lina Knudsen
- Curler
- Born: 17 December 1985 (age 40); Uldum, Denmark

Team
- Curling club: Hvidovre CC (DEN); Gentofte Curling Club (DEN)

Curling career
- Olympic: 1 (2018)

Lina Almind Knudsen (born 17 December 1985 in Uldum) is a Danish curler from Copenhagen. She competed in the 2018 Winter Olympics.

== Personal life ==
Knudsen is a healthcare consultant.
