= European Junior Curling Challenge =

The European Junior Curling Challenge was an annual curling bonspiel held in the World Curling Federation's Europe zone. The challenge featured curlers under the age of 21 competing to qualify for a spot in the World Junior Curling Championships. Nations that participated were those which have not already qualified for the World Junior Championships. This event, as well as the Pacific-Asia Junior Curling Championships were replaced by the World Junior B Curling Championships in 2016. That event currently serves as the qualifier for the World Junior Curling Championships.

== Medals (2005-2015) ==
https://web.archive.org/web/20100302022945/http://results.worldcurling.org/Championships.aspx

Rank	Nation	Gold	Silver	Bronze	Total
1	Italy	6	1	5	12
2	Germany	3	2	2	7
3	Russia	2	4	1	7
4	Czech Republic	2	3	6	11
5	Denmark	2	3	0	5
6	Scotland	2	0	0	2
7	France	1	2	2	5
8	Finland	1	1	0	2
9	England	1	0	2	3
10	Norway	1	0	1	2
11	Austria	1	0	0	1
12	Hungary	0	2	1	3
13	Netherlands	0	1	2	3
14	Turkey	0	1	1	2
15	Poland	0	1	0	1
15	Spain	0	1	0	1
17	Estonia	0	0	4	4
18	Sweden	0	0	1	1
Totals (18 entries)		22	22	28	72

== Results ==
http://results.worldcurling.org/Championship

https://results.worldcurling.org/Championship/Type/14

https://results.worldcurling.org/Record/AllTime/14

https://web.archive.org/web/20100302022945/http://results.worldcurling.org/Championships.aspx

== Summary ==
=== Men ===
Year	Location	Final			Third Place
Year	Location	Champion	Score	Second Place	Third Place
2005	(Denmark) Copenhagen	Denmark	8–1	France	Czech Republic
2006	(Czech Republic) Prague	Italy	6–5	Russia	Czech Republic Germany
2007	(Denmark) Copenhagen	Germany	7–3	Czech Republic^{1}	Italy
2008	(Czech Republic) Prague	Czech Republic	8–6	Poland	France Russia
2009	(Denmark) Copenhagen	Scotland		Russia^{2}	France
2010	(Czech Republic) Prague	Finland	6–5	France	Czech Republic Estonia
2011	(Czech Republic) Prague	Czech Republic	8–4	Russia	Estonia
2012	(Denmark) Copenhagen	Italy	3–2	Russia	Estonia Netherlands
2013	(Czech Republic) Prague	Italy	7–6	Denmark	Estonia Netherlands
2014	(Finland) Lohja	Austria	5–4	Netherlands	Czech Republic
2015	(Czech Republic) Prague	Russia	4–3	Spain	Turkey

=== Women ===
Year	Location	Final			Third Place
Year	Location	Champion	Score	Second Place	Third Place
2005	(Denmark) Copenhagen	Russia	6–5	Germany	Czech Republic
2006	(Czech Republic) Prague	Scotland	4–2	Finland	Italy
2007	(Denmark) Copenhagen	Italy		Czech Republic^{3}	Sweden
2008	(Czech Republic) Prague	Germany	4–3	Italy	Czech Republic
2009	(Denmark) Copenhagen	France	5–3	Czech Republic	Italy
2010	(Czech Republic) Prague	Germany	3–2	Denmark	Norway
2011	(Czech Republic) Prague	Norway	6–4	Germany	Italy
2012	(Denmark) Copenhagen	Italy	5–2	Denmark	England
2013	(Czech Republic) Prague	Denmark	4–1	Hungary	Germany Italy
2014	(Finland) Lohja	Italy	8–3	Hungary	England
2015	(Czech Republic) Prague	England	9–1	Turkey	Hungary

Notes

1. The Czech Republic defeated Italy in the silver medal game.
2. Russia defeated France in the silver medal game.
3. The Czech Republic defeated Sweden in the silver medal game.

== See also ==
- Pacific-Asia Junior Curling Championships
- European Curling Federation
- European Curling Championship
