= Jeanne Ellegaard =

Danish curler (born 1987)

- Curler
- Born: 2 July 1987 (age 39)

Team
- Curling club: Hvidovre CC, Hvidovre, Denmark

Curling career
- Member Association: Denmark
- World Championship: 4 (2011, 2012, 2013, 2015)
- European Championship: 6 (2007, 2010, 2011, 2012, 2013, 2014)
- Olympic: 1 (2014)
Medal record
Women's curling
Representing Denmark
European Curling Championships
Bronze medal – third place	2007 Füssen
World Junior Curling Championships
Bronze medal – third place	2006 Jeonju
Bronze medal – third place	2007 Eveleth

Jeanne Ellegaard (born 2 July 1987) is a Danish curler.

== Career ==
Ellegaard was a member of the Danish team that won a silver medal at the 2005 European Youth Olympic Festival. She played second for Madeleine Dupont.

At the 2006 World Junior Curling Championships, Ellegaard was the alternate player for Nielsen's bronze medal-winning team. The following year, she won another bronze medal, this time throwing third rocks for Madeleine Dupont at the 2007 World Junior Curling Championships. Later that year, she won a bronze medal at the 2007 European Curling Championships as the alternate for the Nielsen team.

Dupont and Ellegaard played in the 2008 World Junior Curling Championships as well, finishing 5th. After juniors, Ellegaard would move to the Nielsen rink as its second thrower. She finished 5th at the 2010 European Curling Championships and would represent the home Denmark rink at the 2011 Capital One World Women's Curling Championship.
