= Julie Høgh =

Danish curler

- Curler
- Born: 30 August 1999 (age 27); Denmark

Team
- Curling club: Hvidovre CC, Hvidovre, Denmark

Curling career
- Member Association: Denmark
- World Championship: 1 (2019)
- European Championship: 2 (2017, 2018)

Julie Dall Høgh (born 30 August 1999) is a Danish curler from Copenhagen playing since she was six. She played for Denmark placing tenth in the 2018 Winter Olympics. She speaks Danish and English.

== Personal life ==
As of 2020 she is a student.
