= 2011 World Senior Curling Championships – Women's tournament =

2011 World Senior Curling Championships Women's tournament
- Host city: St. Paul, Minnesota, United States
- Arena: Saint Paul Curling Club
- Dates: April 15–24, 2011
- Winner: Canada
- Curling club: Juan de Fuca CC; Victoria, British Columbia
- Skip: Christine Jurgenson
- Third: Cheryl Noble
- Second: Pat Sanders
- Lead: Roselyn Craig
- Alternate: Lena West
- Finalist: Sweden (Ingrid Meldahl)

The women's tournament of the 2011 World Senior Curling Championships was held from April 15 to 24, 2011. Eleven women's teams played in a round-robin, and the top four teams will advance to the semifinals, where they played a single-knockout round to determine the winner.

== Teams ==
Canada	Czech Republic	England	Ireland
Skip: Christine Jurgenson Third: Cheryl Noble; Second: Pat Sanders; Lead: Roselyn Craig; Alternate: Lena West	Skip: Lenka Safranková Third: Irena Macková; Second: Vlasta Siveková; Lead: Ivana Sedlacková	Fourth: Susan Young Third: Jean Robinson; Second: Alison Barr; Skip: Sandra Moorcroft	Skip: Marie O'Kane Third: Carolyn Hibberd; Second: Louise Kerr; Lead: Gillian Drury; Alternate: Christina Graham
Japan	New Zealand	Russia	Scotland
Skip: Eriko Igarashi Third: Sueko Nakayama; Second: Eriko Koiwa; Lead: Takako Kuwabara	Skip: Wendy Becker Third: Elizabeth Matthews; Second: Carolyn Cooney; Lead: Christine Bewick; Alternate: Pauline Farra	Fourth: Nadezda Zyablova Third: Liubov Ozerova; Skip: Liudmila Murova; Lead: Larisa Pismenova; Alternate: Natalia Ilyenkova	Skip: Linda Young Third: Maggie Scott; Second: Hazel Swankie; Lead: Fiona de Vries; Alternate: Liz Horton
Sweden	Switzerland	United States	
Skip: Ingrid Meldahl Third: Ann-Catrin Kjerr; Second: Birgitta Törn; Lead: Sylvia Liljefors; Alternate: Gunilla Bergman	Skip: Chantal Forrer Third: Silvia Schrader; Second: Rita Joller; Lead: Ursula Miller; Alternate: Esther Gemperli	Skip: Margie Smith Third: Debbie Dexter; Second: Rachel Orvik; Lead: Sally Barry; Alternate: Shelly Kosal	

== Round-robin standings ==
Final round-robin standings

Key
Teams to Playoffs

Teams	Skip	W	L
Canada	Christine Jurgenson	10	0
United States	Margie Smith	8	2
Switzerland	Chantal Forrer	7	3
Sweden	Ingrid Meldahl	7	3
Scotland	Linda Young	6	4
Czech Republic	Lenka Safranková	4	6
Japan	Eriko Igarashi	4	6
Ireland	Marie O'Kane	3	7
England	Sandra Moorcroft	2	8
New Zealand	Wendy Becker	2	8
Russia	Liudmila Murova	2	8

== Round-robin results ==
All draw times are listed in Central Standard Time (UTC-06).

=== Draw 1 ===
Sunday, April 17, 08:00

Sheet D	1	2	3	4	5	6	7	8	Final
Canada (Jurgenson)	1	1	0	3	0	4	X	X	9
Japan (Igarashi)	0	0	1	0	1	0	X	X	2

Sheet E	1	2	3	4	5	6	7	8	Final
Switzerland (Forrer)	0	0	2	0	1	0	3	1	7
United States (Smith)	0	0	0	2	0	3	0	0	5

Sheet F	1	2	3	4	5	6	7	8	Final
Sweden (Meldahl)	2	1	0	1	0	0	2	X	6
Czech Republic (Safranková)	0	0	1	0	1	0	0	X	2

Sheet G	1	2	3	4	5	6	7	8	Final
Scotland (Horton)	0	0	0	0	0	0	3	X	3
England (Moorcroft)	1	1	1	1	1	1	0	X	6

Sheet H	1	2	3	4	5	6	7	8	Final
Russia (Murova)	0	0	3	0	0	0	3	2	8
New Zealand (Becker)	1	1	0	1	2	1	0	0	6

=== Draw 2 ===
Sunday, April 17, 18:00

Sheet D	1	2	3	4	5	6	7	8	Final
Czech Republic (Safranková)	5	1	2	2	0	0	0	0	10
Ireland (O'Kane)	0	0	0	0	3	1	3	1	8

Sheet E	1	2	3	4	5	6	7	8	Final
Canada (Jurgenson)	1	0	2	0	2	1	1	X	7
New Zealand (Becker)	0	1	0	1	0	0	0	X	2

Sheet F	1	2	3	4	5	6	7	8	Final
Japan (Igarashi)	1	2	0	0	0	2	0	1	6
Scotland (Horton)	0	0	1	1	1	0	2	0	5

Sheet G	1	2	3	4	5	6	7	8	Final
Russia (Murova)	3	0	0	1	0	1	1	0	6
Sweden (Meldahl)	0	5	1	0	1	0	0	1	8

Sheet H	1	2	3	4	5	6	7	8	Final
United States (Smith)	3	2	0	3	2	0	X	X	10
England (Moorcroft)	0	0	1	0	0	1	X	X	2

=== Draw 3 ===
Monday, April 18, 11:00

Sheet D	1	2	3	4	5	6	7	8	Final
Scotland (Horton)	2	0	1	0	0	0	2	2	7
Switzerland (Forrer)	0	2	0	2	1	1	0	0	6

Sheet E	1	2	3	4	5	6	7	8	Final
England (Moorcroft)	0	0	0	0	1	0	0	X	1
Japan (Igarashi)	1	1	2	4	0	1	1	X	10

Sheet F	1	2	3	4	5	6	7	8	Final
United States (Smith)	2	2	2	0	0	1	1	X	8
Ireland (O'Kane)	0	0	0	2	0	0	0	X	2

Sheet G	1	2	3	4	5	6	7	8	Final
Czech Republic (Safranková)	0	4	0	1	0	4	0	1	10
New Zealand (Becker)	2	0	2	0	2	0	1	0	7

Sheet H	1	2	3	4	5	6	7	8	Final
Sweden (Meldahl)	0	0	0	0	0	1	X	X	1
Canada (Jurgenson)	2	4	2	1	2	0	X	X	11

=== Draw 4 ===
Monday, April 18, 18:00

Sheet D	1	2	3	4	5	6	7	8	Final
New Zealand (Becker)	0	1	4	0	4	0	3	X	12
England (Moorcroft)	2	0	0	2	0	1	0	X	5

Sheet E	1	2	3	4	5	6	7	8	Final
Sweden (Meldahl)	1	0	1	0	0	1	0	0	3
Scotland (Horton)	0	1	0	0	1	0	1	1	4

Sheet F	1	2	3	4	5	6	7	8	Final
Switzerland (Forrer)	5	0	1	2	0	1	X	X	9
Russia (Murova)	0	1	0	0	1	0	X	X	2

Sheet G	1	2	3	4	5	6	7	8	Final
Canada (Jurgenson)	1	0	1	0	0	0	1	2	5
United States (Smith)	0	1	0	1	0	0	0	0	2

Sheet H	1	2	3	4	5	6	7	8	Final
Ireland (O'Kane)	0	0	1	0	0	4	4	X	9
Japan (Igarashi)	3	4	0	1	3	0	0	X	11

=== Draw 5 ===
Tuesday, April 19, 11:30

Sheet D	1	2	3	4	5	6	7	8	Final
Sweden (Meldahl)	0	1	0	0	2	X	X	X	3
United States (Smith)	4	0	2	2	0	X	X	X	8

Sheet E	1	2	3	4	5	6	7	8	Final
Russia (Murova)	1	0	0	0	0	0	X	X	1
Ireland (O'Kane)	0	5	2	1	2	1	X	X	11

Sheet F	1	2	3	4	5	6	7	8	Final
Canada (Jurgenson)	1	1	0	4	4	1	X	X	11
England (Moorcroft)	0	0	1	0	0	0	X	X	1

Sheet G	1	2	3	4	5	6	7	8	Final
Japan (Igarashi)	0	3	0	0	0	0	1	X	4
Switzerland (Forrer)	1	0	2	3	1	1	0	X	8

Sheet H	1	2	3	4	5	6	7	8	Final
Czech Republic (Safranková)	1	0	0	0	1	0	0	X	2
Scotland (Horton)	0	1	2	0	0	1	3	X	7

=== Draw 6 ===
Tuesday, April 19, 21:30

Sheet D	1	2	3	4	5	6	7	8	Final
Russia (Murova)	0	0	1	0	0	1	X	X	2
Canada (Jurgenson)	3	3	0	3	0	0	X	X	9

Sheet E	1	2	3	4	5	6	7	8	Final
United States (Smith)	3	2	0	1	0	2	0	X	8
Czech Republic (Safranková)	0	0	1	0	1	0	1	X	3

Sheet F	1	2	3	4	5	6	7	8	Final
Scotland (Horton)	1	0	1	1	0	1	1	2	7
New Zealand (Becker)	0	1	0	0	1	0	0	0	2

Sheet G	1	2	3	4	5	6	7	8	Final
Sweden (Meldahl)	1	0	2	2	2	2	X	X	9
Ireland (O'Kane)	0	1	0	0	0	0	X	X	1

Sheet H	1	2	3	4	5	6	7	8	Final
England (Moorcroft)	1	0	0	0	0	0	X	X	1
Switzerland (Forrer)	0	2	2	2	1	2	X	X	9

=== Draw 7 ===
Wednesday, April 20, 11:00

Sheet D	1	2	3	4	5	6	7	8	Final
Japan (Igarashi)	0	1	0	2	0	1	1	0	5
Czech Republic (Safranková)	1	0	1	0	1	0	0	3	6

Sheet E	1	2	3	4	5	6	7	8	Final
Scotland (Horton)	0	0	0	0	1	0	0	X	1
Canada (Jurgenson)	1	2	1	1	0	2	1	X	8

Sheet F	1	2	3	4	5	6	7	8	Final
Ireland (O'Kane)	0	0	1	1	0	0	1	0	3
Switzerland (Forrer)	1	0	0	0	2	0	0	3	6

Sheet G	1	2	3	4	5	6	7	8	Final
United States (Smith)	2	2	2	1	1	0	X	X	8
Russia (Murova)	0	0	0	0	0	1	X	X	1

Sheet H	1	2	3	4	5	6	7	8	Final
New Zealand (Becker)	0	0	0	1	1	0	1	Z	3
Sweden (Meldahl)	2	1	2	0	0	3	0	X	8

=== Draw 8 ===
Wednesday, April 20, 18:00

Sheet D	1	2	3	4	5	6	7	8	Final
United States (Smith)	3	0	1	1	0	3	1	X	9
Scotland (Horton)	0	1	0	0	2	0	0	X	3

Sheet E	1	2	3	4	5	6	7	8	Final
New Zealand (Becker)	2	0	0	0	0	0	1	X	3
Switzerland (Forrer)	0	1	1	1	2	2	0	X	7

Sheet F	1	2	3	4	5	6	7	8	Final
Russia (Murova)	0	0	0	0	0	3	X	X	3
Japan (Igarashi)	3	2	1	2	1	0	X	X	9

Sheet G	1	2	3	4	5	6	7	8	Final
England (Moorcroft)	0	0	1	0	1	0	1	X	3
Czech Republic (Safranková)	1	2	0	1	0	3	0	X	7

Sheet H	1	2	3	4	5	6	7	8	Final
Canada (Jurgenson)	4	0	2	0	3	1	X	X	10
Ireland (O'Kane)	0	1	0	2	0	0	X	X	3

=== Draw 9 ===
Thursday, April 21, 08:00

Sheet D	1	2	3	4	5	6	7	8	Final
England (Moorcroft)	0	2	3	0	0	1	3	X	9
Russia (Murova)	1	0	0	3	1	0	0	X	5

Sheet E	1	2	3	4	5	6	7	8	Final
Japan (Igarashi)	0	2	1	0	1	0	0	X	4
Sweden (Meldahl)	1	0	0	1	0	2	3	X	7

Sheet F	1	2	3	4	5	6	7	8	Final
New Zealand (Becker)	0	0	0	0	0	1	X	X	1
United States (Smith)	1	1	0	3	2	0	X	X	7

Sheet G	1	2	3	4	5	6	7	8	Final
Ireland (O'Kane)	0	0	0	0	0	0	0	0	0
Scotland (Horton)	1	0	0	0	0	0	0	0	1

* A member of the Scottish rink sustained an injury during play, so the Irish rink opted to forfeit the game.

Sheet H	1	2	3	4	5	6	7	8	Final
Switzerland (Forrer)	1	0	0	0	2	2	0	X	5
Czech Republic (Safranková)	0	1	0	0	0	0	1	X	2

=== Draw 10 ===
Thursday, April 21, 18:00

Sheet D	1	2	3	4	5	6	7	8	Final
Ireland (O'Kane)	0	2	2	1	0	2	0	X	7
New Zealand (Becker)	1	0	0	0	3	0	2	X	6

Sheet E	1	2	3	4	5	6	7	8	Final
Czech Republic (Safranková)	0	3	0	0	2	0	1	X	6
Russia (Murova)	2	0	2	1	0	2	0	X	7

Sheet F	1	2	3	4	5	6	7	8	Final
England (Moorcroft)	0	1	0	0	1	0	X	X	2
Sweden (Meldahl)	5	0	4	1	0	1	X	X	11

Sheet G	1	2	3	4	5	6	7	8	Final
Switzerland (Forrer)	0	1	0	1	0	0	1	X	3
Canada (Jurgenson)	0	0	2	0	2	1	0	X	5

Sheet H	1	2	3	4	5	6	7	8	Final
Japan (Igarashi)	0	0	1	0	3	0	X	X	4
United States (Smith)	5	5	0	3	0	3	X	X	16

=== Draw 11 ===
Friday, April 22, 08:00

Sheet D	1	2	3	4	5	6	7	8	Final
Switzerland (Forrer)	0	0	0	1	0	2	0	0	3
Sweden (Meldahl)	1	0	1	0	0	0	0	2	4

Sheet E	1	2	3	4	5	6	7	8	Final
Ireland (O'Kane)	1	0	3	2	0	4	3	X	13
England (Moorcroft)	0	3	0	0	1	0	0	X	4

Sheet F	1	2	3	4	5	6	7	8	Final
Czech Republic (Safranková)	0	1	1	0	0	1	0	X	3
Canada (Jurgenson)	1	0	0	1	3	0	2	X	7

Sheet G	1	2	3	4	5	6	7	8	Final
New Zealand (Becker)	3	0	3	2	0	0	1	X	9
Japan (Igarashi)	0	1	0	0	1	1	0	X	3

Sheet H	1	2	3	4	5	6	7	8	Final
Scotland (Horton)	1	0	0	0	1	2	2	1	7
Russia (Murova)	0	1	1	1	0	0	0	0	3

== Playoffs ==
Semifinals
1	Canada	6
4	Switzerland	5
2	United States	5
3	Sweden	7

Final
1	Canada	9
3	Sweden	2
Bronze Medal Match
4	Switzerland	5
2	United States	4

=== Semifinals ===
Saturday, April 23, 9:00

Sheet G	1	2	3	4	5	6	7	8	Final
Canada (Jurgenson)	0	1	0	3	0	0	0	2	6
Switzerland (Forrer)	0	0	1	0	1	2	1	0	5

Sheet H	1	2	3	4	5	6	7	8	Final
United States (Smith)	0	1	0	3	0	0	0	1	5
Sweden (Meldahl)	0	0	2	0	2	1	2	0	7

=== Bronze medal game ===
Saturday, April 23, 14:00

Team	1	2	3	4	5	6	7	8	Final
Switzerland (Forrer)	0	0	1	0	2	1	0	1	5
United States (Smith)	1	1	0	1	0	0	1	0	4

=== Gold medal game ===
Saturday, April 23, 14:00

Team	1	2	3	4	5	6	7	8	Final
Canada (Jurgenson)	3	0	4	0	0	2	X	X	9
Sweden (Meldahl)	0	0	0	1	1	0	X	X	2

2011 World Women's Senior Curling Championship Winner
(Canada)
Canada
7th title
