= 2013 World Senior Curling Championships – Women's tournament =

2013 World Senior Curling Championships Women's tournament
- Host city: Fredericton, New Brunswick
- Arena: Grant-Harvey Centre
- Dates: April 13–20
- Winner: Canada
- Curling club: Saville Sports Centre, Edmonton
- Skip: Cathy King
- Third: Carolyn Morris
- Second: Lesley McEwan
- Lead: Doreen Gares
- Alternate: Christine Jurgenson
- Finalist: Austria (Veronika Huber)

The women's tournament of the 2013 World Senior Curling Championships was held at the Grant-Harvey Centre in Fredericton, New Brunswick from April 13 to 20.

== Teams ==
The teams are listed as follows:

=== Pool A ===
Austria	Canada	Ireland	Japan
Skip: Veronika Huber; Third: Edeltraud Koudelka; Second: Anna Reiner; Lead: Heidlinde Gasteiger; Alternate: Adelheid Wallner	Skip: Cathy King; Third: Carolyn Morris; Second: Lesley McEwan; Lead: Doreen Gares; Alternate: Christine Jurgenson	Skip: Marie O'Kane; Third: Louise Kerr; Second: Gillian Drury; Lead: Christina Graham	Skip: Mikiko Tsuchiya; Third: Hatsue Hirama; Second: Katsuko Matsui; Lead: Machiko Tsuchiya
New Zealand	Russia	United States	
Fourth: Helen Greer; Third: Christine Diack; Second: Carolyn Cooney; Skip: Elizabeth Matthews; Alternate: Glenys Taylor	Skip: Liudmila Murova; Third: Antonina Trefilova; Second: Natalia Ilyenkova; Lead: Larisa Pismenova	Skip: Margie Smith; Third: Norma O'Leary; Second: Debbie Dexter; Lead: Shelly Kosal; Alternate: Lucy DeVore	

=== Pool B ===
Australia	Czech Republic	Finland	Italy
Skip: Lynn Hewitt; Third: Ellen Weir; Second: Gwen Wills; Lead: Jenny Riordan	Skip: Irena Macková; Third: Jana Horacková; Second: Vlasta Siveková; Lead: Ivana Sedlacková; Alternate: Jitka Slaviková	Skip: Kirsti Kauste; Third: Tuula Merentie; Second: Riitta-Liisa Hämäläinen; Lead: Helena Sorvari; Alternate: Kristiina Nokelainen	Skip: Lucillia Macchiati; Third: Caterina Colucci; Second: Roberta Masinari; Lead: Mafalda Hausberger; Alternate: Lorenza Depaulis
Scotland	Sweden	Switzerland	
Skip: Christine Cannon; Third: Margaret Richardson; Second: Janet Lindsay; Lead: Margaret Robertson; Alternate: Marion Craig	Skip: Ingrid Meldahl; Third: Ann-Catrin Kjerr; Second: Birgitta Törn; Lead: Sylvia Liljefors; Alternate: Mia Lehander	Skip: Erika Müller; Third: Barbara Gurini; Second: Cristina Lestander; Lead: Anna Müller; Alternate: Barbara Sieber	

== Round-robin standings ==
Final round-robin standings

Key
Teams to Playoffs
Teams to Tiebreaker

Pool A	Skip	W	L
Canada	Cathy King	6	0
Austria	Veronika Huber	4	2
Japan	Mikiko Tsuchiya	4	2
United States	Margie Smith	3	3
New Zealand	Elizabeth Matthews	3	3
Ireland	Marie O'Kane	1	5
Russia	Liudmila Murova	0	6

Pool B	Skip	W	L
Scotland	Christine Cannon	6	0
Sweden	Ingrid Meldahl	5	1
Switzerland	Erika Müller	4	2
Italy	Lucillia Macchiati	3	3
Australia	Lynn Hewitt	1	5
Czech Republic	Irena Macková	1	5
Finland	Kirsti Kauste	1	5

== Round-robin results ==
All draw times are listed in Atlantic Daylight Time (UTC−3).

=== Draw 3 ===
Saturday, April 13, 16:00

Sheet E	1	2	3	4	5	6	7	8	Final
Ireland (O'Kane)	0	0	1	0	1	0	X	X	2
Canada (King)	3	1	0	3	0	1	X	X	8

=== Draw 4 ===
Saturday, April 13, 19:00

Sheet A	1	2	3	4	5	6	7	8	Final
Italy (Macchiati)	0	0	0	0	0	0	X	X	0
Sweden (Meldahl)	2	2	2	2	2	3	X	X	13

Sheet B	1	2	3	4	5	6	7	8	Final
Russia (Murova)	0	2	2	1	0	2	0	0	7
Austria (Huber)	2	0	0	0	4	0	2	3	11

Sheet C	1	2	3	4	5	6	7	8	Final
New Zealand (Matthews)	0	0	1	0	0	1	X	X	2
Japan (Tsuchiya)	2	2	0	3	3	0	X	X	10

Sheet D	1	2	3	4	5	6	7	8	Final
Switzerland (Müller)	1	3	0	2	1	0	4	X	11
Finland (Kauste)	0	0	1	0	0	5	0	X	6

Sheet E	1	2	3	4	5	6	7	8	Final
Czech Republic (Macková)	0	1	0	0	1	0	1	X	3
Scotland (Cannon)	3	0	1	2	0	2	0	X	8

=== Draw 5 ===
Sunday, April 14, 8:30

Sheet E	1	2	3	4	5	6	7	8	Final
Sweden (Meldahl)	1	0	0	2	2	0	3	X	8
Switzerland (Müller)	0	0	1	0	0	1	0	X	2

=== Draw 6 ===
Sunday, April 14, 12:00

Sheet A	1	2	3	4	5	6	7	8	Final
Canada (King)	4	5	5	0	6	1	X	X	21
Russia (Murova)	0	0	0	1	0	0	X	X	1

Sheet B	1	2	3	4	5	6	7	8	Final
Czech Republic (Macková)	0	0	0	2	0	0	2	1	5
Italy (Macchiati)	2	1	1	0	1	1	0	0	6

Sheet C	1	2	3	4	5	6	7	8	Final
United States (Smith)	5	0	3	2	1	0	X	X	11
Ireland (O'Kane)	0	1	0	0	0	1	X	X	2

Sheet D	1	2	3	4	5	6	7	8	Final
Scotland (Cannon)	1	1	0	0	1	0	4	X	7
Australia (Hewitt)	0	0	1	0	0	1	0	X	2

Sheet E	1	2	3	4	5	6	7	8	Final
Japan (Tsuchiya)	0	0	2	0	1	0	2	X	5
Austria (Huber)	2	3	0	2	0	4	0	X	11

=== Draw 9 ===
Monday, April 15, 8:30

Sheet B	1	2	3	4	5	6	7	8	Final
Canada (King)	3	0	0	1	4	0	3	X	11
Japan (Tsuchiya)	0	1	1	0	0	1	0	X	3

Sheet C	1	2	3	4	5	6	7	8	Final
Australia (Hewitt)	0	0	0	1	1	0	0	X	2
Czech Republic (Macková)	1	1	1	0	0	1	1	X	5

Sheet D	1	2	3	4	5	6	7	8	Final
Finland (Kauste)	0	0	3	0	0	0	0	X	3
Italy (Macchiati)	1	2	0	1	1	1	4	X	10

Sheet E	1	2	3	4	5	6	7	8	Final
United States (Smith)	3	0	4	0	2	5	X	X	14
Russia (Murova)	0	1	0	1	0	0	X	X	2

=== Draw 10 ===
Monday, April 15, 12:00

Sheet D	1	2	3	4	5	6	7	8	Final
New Zealand (Matthews)	5	1	1	3	1	2	X	X	13
Austria (Huber)	0	0	0	0	0	0	X	X	0

=== Draw 11 ===
Monday, April 15, 15:30

Sheet B	1	2	3	4	5	6	7	8	Final
Scotland (Cannon)	2	0	0	3	1	3	X	X	9
Sweden (Meldahl)	0	1	0	0	0	0	X	X	1

=== Draw 14 ===
Tuesday, April 16, 12:00

Sheet A	1	2	3	4	5	6	7	8	9	Final
Japan (Tsuchiya)	1	0	0	1	1	0	1	0	1	5
United States (Smith)	0	1	0	0	0	1	0	2	0	4

Sheet B	1	2	3	4	5	6	7	8	Final
Finland (Kauste)	0	2	0	0	2	0	X	X	4
Scotland (Cannon)	2	0	4	1	0	4	X	X	11

Sheet C	1	2	3	4	5	6	7	8	Final
Italy (Macchiati)	0	0	0	1	0	1	0	X	2
Switzerland (Müller)	1	1	1	0	3	0	3	X	9

Sheet D	1	2	3	4	5	6	7	8	Final
Russia (Murova)	0	1	1	1	0	1	0	0	4
Ireland (O'Kane)	2	0	0	0	2	0	4	0	8

Sheet E	1	2	3	4	5	6	7	8	Final
Canada (King)	3	5	3	0	2	6	X	X	19
New Zealand (Matthews)	0	0	0	1	0	0	X	X	1

=== Draw 15 ===
Tuesday, April 16, 15:30

Sheet E	1	2	3	4	5	6	7	8	Final
Australia (Hewitt)	0	0	1	1	0	0	2	0	4
Sweden (Meldahl)	1	0	0	0	2	2	0	1	6

=== Draw 17 ===
Wednesday, April 17, 8:30

Sheet A	1	2	3	4	5	6	7	8	9	Final
Switzerland (Müller)	0	0	1	0	1	0	0	1	0	3
Scotland (Cannon)	0	1	0	1	0	1	0	0	1	4

Sheet B	1	2	3	4	5	6	7	8	Final
Ireland (O'Kane)	0	0	0	0	1	0	0	X	1
New Zealand (Matthews)	2	1	1	1	0	3	2	X	10

Sheet C	1	2	3	4	5	6	7	8	Final
Japan (Tsuchiya)	2	1	1	1	4	1	X	X	10
Russia (Murova)	0	0	0	0	0	0	X	X	0

Sheet D	1	2	3	4	5	6	7	8	Final
Sweden (Meldahl)	1	2	2	3	0	1	2	X	11
Czech Republic (Macková)	0	0	0	0	2	0	0	X	2

Sheet E	1	2	3	4	5	6	7	8	Final
Austria (Huber)	2	1	0	2	0	4	2	X	11
United States (Smith)	0	0	1	0	1	0	0	X	2

=== Draw 18 ===
Wednesday, April 17, 12:00

Sheet A	1	2	3	4	5	6	7	8	9	Final
Australia (Hewitt)	0	0	0	2	2	2	3	1	1	11
Finland (Kauste)	4	4	2	0	0	0	0	0	0	10

=== Draw 23 ===
Thursday, April 18, 15:30

Sheet A	1	2	3	4	5	6	7	8	Final
Czech Republic (Macková)	0	1	0	1	0	0	0	X	2
Switzerland (Müller)	4	0	2	0	3	1	5	X	15

Sheet B	1	2	3	4	5	6	7	8	9	Final
New Zealand (Matthews)	3	0	0	1	0	1	0	1	0	6
United States (Smith)	0	3	1	0	1	0	1	0	2	8

Sheet C	1	2	3	4	5	6	7	8	Final
Austria (Huber)	0	0	0	0	0	1	X	X	1
Canada (King)	2	4	3	2	1	0	X	X	12

Sheet D	1	2	3	4	5	6	7	8	Final
Ireland (O'Kane)	0	0	0	3	0	0	X	X	3
Japan (Tsuchiya)	1	1	4	0	4	1	X	X	11

Sheet E	1	2	3	4	5	6	7	8	Final
Italy (Macchiati)	0	0	0	2	3	2	3	X	10
Australia (Hewitt)	2	1	1	0	0	0	0	X	4

=== Draw 24 ===
Thursday, April 18, 19:00

Sheet C	1	2	3	4	5	6	7	8	Final
Sweden (Meldahl)	1	0	1	3	3	3	X	X	11
Finland (Kauste)	0	2	0	0	0	0	X	X	2

=== Draw 25 ===
Friday, April 19, 8:30

Sheet A	1	2	3	4	5	6	7	8	Final
Russia (Murova)	1	1	1	0	0	0	X	X	3
New Zealand (Matthews)	0	0	0	3	3	3	X	X	9

=== Draw 26 ===
Friday, April 19, 12:00

Sheet A	1	2	3	4	5	6	7	8	Final
Austria (Huber)	3	0	1	0	2	0	1	1	8
Ireland (O'Kane)	0	3	0	2	0	1	0	0	6

Sheet B	1	2	3	4	5	6	7	8	Final
Switzerland (Müller)	0	2	0	1	2	0	1	X	6
Australia (Hewitt)	1	0	1	0	0	1	0	X	3

Sheet C	1	2	3	4	5	6	7	8	Final
Scotland (Cannon)	0	3	3	0	0	1	0	X	7
Italy (Macchiati)	1	0	0	1	1	0	0	X	3

Sheet D	1	2	3	4	5	6	7	8	Final
United States (Smith)	1	0	0	0	2	0	1	X	4
Canada (King)	0	1	0	3	0	2	0	X	6

Sheet E	1	2	3	4	5	6	7	8	Final
Finland (Kauste)	1	3	5	1	0	1	0	X	11
Czech Republic (Macková)	0	0	0	0	3	0	2	X	5

== Tiebreaker ==
Friday, April 19, 19:00

Sheet C	1	2	3	4	5	6	7	8	Final
Austria (Huber)	3	3	0	3	0	0	0	2	11
Japan (Tsuchiya)	0	0	2	0	3	1	1	0	7

== Playoffs ==
Semifinals
A1	Canada	7
B2	Sweden	6
B1	Scotland	6
A2	Austria	11

Gold Medal Game
A1	Canada	13
A2	Austria	1
Bronze Medal Game
B2	Sweden	9
B1	Scotland	8

=== Semifinals ===
Saturday, April 20, 8:00

Sheet E	1	2	3	4	5	6	7	8	9	Final
Canada (King)	1	0	2	1	0	0	2	0	1	7
Sweden (Meldahl)	0	2	0	0	1	2	0	1	0	6

Sheet D	1	2	3	4	5	6	7	8	Final
Scotland (Cannon)	0	3	1	0	2	0	0	X	6
Austria (Huber)	2	0	0	4	0	1	4	X	11

=== Bronze medal game ===
Saturday, April 20, 14:00

Sheet B	1	2	3	4	5	6	7	8	9	Final
Sweden (Meldahl)	0	2	0	2	2	0	2	0	1	9
Scotland (Cannon)	2	0	3	0	0	1	0	2	0	8

=== Gold medal game ===
Saturday, April 20, 14:00

Sheet C	1	2	3	4	5	6	7	8	Final
Canada (King)	6	1	0	1	5	0	X	X	13
Austria (Huber)	0	0	1	0	0	0	X	X	1
