= 2012 World Senior Curling Championships – Women's tournament =

Women's curling tournament in 2012

2012 World Senior Curling Championships Women's tournament
- Host city: Tårnby, Denmark
- Arena: Tårnby Curling Club
- Dates: April 14–21
- Winner: Canada
- Curling club: Thistle Saint Andrews CC; Saint John, New Brunswick
- Skip: Heidi Hanlon
- Third: Kathy Floyd
- Second: Judy Blanchard
- Lead: Jane Arseneau
- Finalist: Scotland (Barbara Watt)

The women's tournament of the 2012 World Senior Curling Championships was held from April 14 to 21.

== Teams ==
The teams are listed as follows:

=== Yellow Group ===
| Canada | Denmark | Finland | Ireland |
|---|---|---|---|
| Skip: Heidi Hanlon Third: Kathy Floyd; Second: Judy Blanchard; Lead: Jane Arseneau | Skip: Jane Bidstrup Third: Iben Larsen; Second: Lilian Nielsen; Lead: Lone Bagge Harry; Alternate: Mai Greulich | Skip: Kirsti Kauste Third: Riitta-Liisa Hämäläinen; Second: Helena Sorvari; Lead: Kristiina Nokelainen; Alternate: Tuula Merentie | Skip: Marie O'Kane Third: Gillian Drury; Second: Louise Kerr; Lead: Christina Graham |
| Russia | Scotland | United States | |
| Skip: Liudmila Murova Third: Antonina Trefilova; Second: Natalia Ilyenkova; Lead: Larisa Pismenova | Skip: Barbara Watt Third: Jean Hammond; Second: Maggie Barry; Lead: Valerie Mahon; Alternate: Judith Carr | Skip: Pam Oleinik Third: Laurie Rahn; Second: Julie Denten; Lead: Stephanie Martin; Alternate: Joni Cotten | |

=== Rose Group ===
| Czech Republic | Italy | Japan | New Zealand |
|---|---|---|---|
| Skip: Ivana Danielisová Third: Milena Vojtusová; Second: Jana Volfová; Lead: Alena Samueliová; Alternate: Renée Lepsiková | Skip: Lucilla Macchiati Third: Caterina Colucci; Second: Roberta Masinari; Lead: Lorenza Depaulis; Alternate: Mafalda Hausberger | Skip: Mikiko Tsuchiya Third: Hatsue Hirama; Second: Mikiko Kimura; Lead: Hiroko Oishi; Alternate: Machiko Tsuchiya | Skip: Wendy Becker Third: Christine Diack; Second: Carolyn Cooney; Lead: Helen Greer; Alternate: Elizabeth Matthews |
| Slovakia | Sweden | Switzerland | |
| Fourth: Elena Jancariková Skip: Margita Matuskovicová; Second: Maria Plandorová; Lead: Dana Moravčiková | Skip: Ingrid Meldahl Third: Ann-Catrin Kjerr; Second: Birgitta Törn; Lead: Sylvia Liljefors; Alternate: Marie Lehander | Skip: Chantal Forrer Third: Erika Müller; Second: Rita Joller; Lead: Ursula Miller; Alternate: Esther Gemperli | |

== Round robin standings ==
Final Round Robin Standings

Key
| Teams to Playoffs |
| Teams to Tiebreaker |

| Yellow Group | Skip | W | L |
|---|---|---|---|
| Canada | Heidi Hanlon | 6 | 0 |
| Scotland | Barbara Watt | 4 | 2 |
| United States | Pam Oleinik | 4 | 2 |
| Ireland | Marie O'Kane | 3 | 3 |
| Denmark | Jane Bidstrup | 2 | 4 |
| Finland | Kirsti Kauste | 1 | 5 |
| Russia | Liudmila Murova | 1 | 5 |

| Rose Group | Skip | W | L |
|---|---|---|---|
| Sweden | Ingrid Meldahl | 6 | 0 |
| New Zealand | Wendy Becker | 5 | 1 |
| Switzerland | Chantal Forrer | 4 | 2 |
| Czech Republic | Ivana Danielisová | 3 | 3 |
| Japan | Mikiko Tsuchiya | 2 | 4 |
| Slovakia | Elena Jancariková | 1 | 5 |
| Italy | Lucilla Macchiati | 1 | 5 |

== Round robin results ==
All times listed in Central Europe Time (UTC+1).

=== Yellow Group ===
==== Sunday, April 15 ====
Draw 3 16:00

| Sheet A | 1 | 2 | 3 | 4 | 5 | 6 | 7 | 8 | Final |
| Russia (Murova) | 0 | 1 | 1 | 2 | 0 | 0 | 3 | 0 | 7 |
| Scotland (Watt) | 1 | 0 | 0 | 0 | 1 | 2 | 0 | 1 | 5 |

| Sheet B | 1 | 2 | 3 | 4 | 5 | 6 | 7 | 8 | Final |
| Ireland (O'Kane) | 0 | 1 | 1 | 0 | 1 | 0 | 1 | X | 4 |
| United States (Oleinik) | 4 | 0 | 0 | 1 | 0 | 3 | 0 | X | 8 |

| Sheet E | 1 | 2 | 3 | 4 | 5 | 6 | 7 | 8 | Final |
| Finland (Kauste) | 0 | 1 | 0 | 1 | 0 | 0 | X | X | 2 |
| Canada (Hanlon) | 4 | 0 | 2 | 0 | 2 | 3 | X | X | 11 |

==== Monday, April 16 ====
Draw 6 12:30

| Sheet C | 1 | 2 | 3 | 4 | 5 | 6 | 7 | 8 | Final |
| Finland (Kauste) | 0 | 0 | 1 | 1 | 0 | 3 | 2 | 0 | 7 |
| Russia (Murova) | 1 | 1 | 0 | 0 | 2 | 0 | 0 | 1 | 5 |

| Sheet D | 1 | 2 | 3 | 4 | 5 | 6 | 7 | 8 | Final |
| Scotland (Watt) | 1 | 1 | 2 | 2 | 0 | 2 | 0 | X | 8 |
| Denmark (Bidstrup) | 0 | 0 | 0 | 0 | 2 | 0 | 3 | X | 5 |

| Sheet F | 1 | 2 | 3 | 4 | 5 | 6 | 7 | 8 | Final |
| Canada (Hanlon) | 0 | 4 | 4 | 0 | 3 | 1 | X | X | 12 |
| United States (Oleinik) | 0 | 0 | 0 | 1 | 0 | 0 | X | X | 1 |

Draw 8 19:30

| Sheet C | 1 | 2 | 3 | 4 | 5 | 6 | 7 | 8 | Final |
| Canada (Hanlon) | 4 | 3 | 3 | 0 | 1 | 0 | X | X | 11 |
| Ireland (O'Kane) | 0 | 0 | 0 | 1 | 0 | 1 | X | X | 2 |

| Sheet D | 1 | 2 | 3 | 4 | 5 | 6 | 7 | 8 | Final |
| United States (Oleinik) | 4 | 0 | 0 | 1 | 1 | 2 | 3 | X | 11 |
| Russia (Murova) | 0 | 2 | 1 | 0 | 0 | 0 | 0 | X | 3 |

| Sheet F | 1 | 2 | 3 | 4 | 5 | 6 | 7 | 8 | Final |
| Denmark (Bidstrup) | 2 | 0 | 4 | 4 | 1 | 4 | X | X | 15 |
| Finland (Kauste) | 0 | 1 | 0 | 0 | 0 | 0 | X | X | 1 |

==== Tuesday, April 17 ====
Draw 11 16:00

| Sheet A | 1 | 2 | 3 | 4 | 5 | 6 | 7 | 8 | Final |
| United States (Oleinik) | 1 | 0 | 3 | 3 | 1 | 0 | 0 | 1 | 9 |
| Denmark (Bidstrup) | 0 | 1 | 0 | 0 | 0 | 4 | 1 | 0 | 6 |

| Sheet B | 1 | 2 | 3 | 4 | 5 | 6 | 7 | 8 | Final |
| Scotland (Watt) | 0 | 1 | 0 | 5 | 0 | 1 | 0 | 3 | 10 |
| Finland (Kauste) | 1 | 0 | 3 | 0 | 1 | 0 | 2 | 0 | 7 |

| Sheet E | 1 | 2 | 3 | 4 | 5 | 6 | 7 | 8 | Final |
| Ireland (O'Kane) | 2 | 0 | 1 | 0 | 0 | 3 | 0 | X | 6 |
| Russia (Murova) | 0 | 1 | 0 | 1 | 1 | 0 | 1 | X | 4 |

==== Wednesday, April 18 ====
Draw 14 12:30

| Sheet E | 1 | 2 | 3 | 4 | 5 | 6 | 7 | 8 | Final |
| Denmark (Bidstrup) | 0 | 1 | 0 | 0 | 2 | 0 | 0 | X | 3 |
| Ireland (O'Kane) | 1 | 0 | 1 | 1 | 0 | 1 | 1 | X | 5 |

Draw 15 16:00

| Sheet C | 1 | 2 | 3 | 4 | 5 | 6 | 7 | 8 | Final |
| Scotland (Watt) | 1 | 0 | 2 | 0 | 2 | 1 | 0 | X | 6 |
| United States (Oleinik) | 0 | 2 | 0 | 1 | 0 | 0 | 2 | X | 5 |

| Sheet D | 1 | 2 | 3 | 4 | 5 | 6 | 7 | 8 | Final |
| Russia (Murova) | 1 | 1 | 0 | 2 | 0 | 0 | X | X | 4 |
| Canada (Hanlon) | 0 | 0 | 1 | 0 | 3 | 5 | X | X | 9 |

==== Thursday, April 19 ====
Draw 18 12:30

| Sheet B | 1 | 2 | 3 | 4 | 5 | 6 | 7 | 8 | Final |
| Denmark (Bidstrup) | 0 | 1 | 0 | 2 | 0 | 0 | X | X | 3 |
| Canada (Hanlon) | 3 | 0 | 1 | 0 | 3 | 2 | X | X | 9 |

| Sheet F | 1 | 2 | 3 | 4 | 5 | 6 | 7 | 8 | Final |
| United States (Oleinik) | 1 | 0 | 0 | 2 | 1 | 2 | 1 | X | 7 |
| Finland (Kauste) | 0 | 1 | 1 | 0 | 0 | 0 | 0 | X | 2 |

| Sheet G | 1 | 2 | 3 | 4 | 5 | 6 | 7 | 8 | Final |
| Ireland (O'Kane) | 0 | 1 | 0 | 2 | 1 | 0 | 0 | X | 4 |
| Scotland (Watt) | 1 | 0 | 2 | 0 | 0 | 3 | 3 | X | 9 |

Draw 20 19:30

| Sheet B | 1 | 2 | 3 | 4 | 5 | 6 | 7 | 8 | Final |
| Finland (Kauste) | 0 | 2 | 0 | 0 | 1 | 0 | 1 | X | 4 |
| Ireland (O'Kane) | 1 | 0 | 1 | 3 | 0 | 2 | 0 | X | 7 |

| Sheet F | 1 | 2 | 3 | 4 | 5 | 6 | 7 | 8 | Final |
| Canada (Hanlon) | 2 | 0 | 1 | 1 | 0 | 1 | 1 | X | 6 |
| Scotland (Watt) | 0 | 1 | 0 | 0 | 1 | 0 | 0 | X | 2 |

| Sheet G | 1 | 2 | 3 | 4 | 5 | 6 | 7 | 8 | Final |
| Russia (Murova) | 0 | 0 | 0 | 0 | 1 | 1 | X | X | 2 |
| Denmark (Bidstrup) | 2 | 2 | 3 | 3 | 0 | 0 | X | X | 10 |

=== Rose Group ===
==== Sunday, April 15 ====
Draw 2 12:30

| Sheet B | 1 | 2 | 3 | 4 | 5 | 6 | 7 | 8 | 9 | Final |
| Switzerland (Forrer) | 1 | 0 | 1 | 0 | 2 | 0 | 2 | 0 | 1 | 7 |
| Slovakia (Jancariková) | 0 | 1 | 0 | 3 | 0 | 1 | 0 | 1 | 0 | 6 |

| Sheet F | 1 | 2 | 3 | 4 | 5 | 6 | 7 | 8 | Final |
| New Zealand (Becker) | 0 | 2 | 0 | 1 | 1 | 0 | 0 | X | 4 |
| Sweden (Meldahl) | 1 | 0 | 4 | 0 | 0 | 2 | 2 | X | 9 |

| Sheet G | 1 | 2 | 3 | 4 | 5 | 6 | 7 | 8 | Final |
| Czech Republic (Danielisová) | 0 | 1 | 2 | 3 | 0 | 1 | 0 | 2 | 9 |
| Japan (Tsuchiya) | 1 | 0 | 0 | 0 | 1 | 0 | 2 | 0 | 4 |

Draw 4 19:30

| Sheet B | 1 | 2 | 3 | 4 | 5 | 6 | 7 | 8 | Final |
| Sweden (Meldahl) | 2 | 1 | 0 | 3 | 1 | 2 | 0 | X | 9 |
| Czech Republic (Danielisová) | 0 | 0 | 1 | 0 | 0 | 0 | 1 | X | 2 |

| Sheet F | 1 | 2 | 3 | 4 | 5 | 6 | 7 | 8 | Final |
| Slovakia (Jancariková) | 1 | 0 | 1 | 0 | 1 | 1 | 0 | X | 4 |
| Japan (Tsuchiya) | 0 | 2 | 0 | 3 | 0 | 0 | 3 | X | 8 |

| Sheet G | 1 | 2 | 3 | 4 | 5 | 6 | 7 | 8 | Final |
| Switzerland (Forrer) | 1 | 0 | 3 | 1 | 0 | 3 | 0 | 0 | 8 |
| Italy (Macchiati) | 0 | 2 | 0 | 0 | 2 | 0 | 1 | 2 | 7 |

==== Monday, April 16 ====
Draw 7 16:00

| Sheet A | 1 | 2 | 3 | 4 | 5 | 6 | 7 | 8 | Final |
| Czech Republic (Danielisová) | 0 | 0 | 1 | 0 | 1 | 0 | 0 | X | 2 |
| New Zealand (Becker) | 1 | 1 | 0 | 3 | 0 | 1 | 2 | X | 8 |

| Sheet B | 1 | 2 | 3 | 4 | 5 | 6 | 7 | 8 | Final |
| Japan (Tsuchiya) | 0 | 0 | 2 | 1 | 0 | 2 | 1 | 3 | 9 |
| Italy (Macchiati) | 3 | 1 | 0 | 0 | 1 | 0 | 0 | 0 | 5 |

| Sheet E | 1 | 2 | 3 | 4 | 5 | 6 | 7 | 8 | Final |
| Sweden (Meldahl) | 0 | 1 | 2 | 2 | 1 | 0 | 1 | X | 7 |
| Slovakia (Jancariková) | 1 | 0 | 0 | 0 | 0 | 1 | 0 | X | 2 |

==== Tuesday, April 17 ====
Draw 10 12:30

| Sheet B | 1 | 2 | 3 | 4 | 5 | 6 | 7 | 8 | Final |
| Slovakia (Jancariková) | 0 | 0 | 0 | 2 | 0 | 0 | X | X | 2 |
| New Zealand (Becker) | 1 | 2 | 3 | 0 | 4 | 3 | X | X | 13 |

| Sheet F | 1 | 2 | 3 | 4 | 5 | 6 | 7 | 8 | Final |
| Japan (Tsuchiya) | 0 | 1 | 0 | 0 | 1 | 0 | 1 | X | 3 |
| Switzerland (Forrer) | 2 | 0 | 5 | 1 | 0 | 1 | 0 | X | 9 |

| Sheet G | 1 | 2 | 3 | 4 | 5 | 6 | 7 | 8 | Final |
| Italy (Macchiati) | 3 | 0 | 0 | 0 | 1 | 0 | 0 | X | 4 |
| Sweden (Meldahl) | 0 | 3 | 1 | 2 | 0 | 2 | 3 | X | 11 |

Draw 12 19:30

| Sheet C | 1 | 2 | 3 | 4 | 5 | 6 | 7 | 8 | Final |
| New Zealand (Becker) | 3 | 0 | 0 | 4 | 2 | 0 | 0 | X | 9 |
| Italy (Macchiati) | 0 | 1 | 2 | 0 | 0 | 2 | 1 | X | 6 |

| Sheet D | 1 | 2 | 3 | 4 | 5 | 6 | 7 | 8 | Final |
| Switzerland (Forrer) | 0 | 0 | 0 | 2 | 0 | 0 | 1 | 0 | 3 |
| Sweden (Meldahl) | 1 | 0 | 0 | 0 | 2 | 1 | 0 | 1 | 5 |

| Sheet G | 1 | 2 | 3 | 4 | 5 | 6 | 7 | 8 | Final |
| Slovakia (Jancariková) | 0 | 1 | 1 | 0 | 2 | 0 | 1 | X | 5 |
| Czech Republic (Danielisová) | 2 | 0 | 0 | 6 | 0 | 1 | 0 | X | 9 |

==== Wednesday, April 18 ====
Draw 16 19:30

| Sheet A | 1 | 2 | 3 | 4 | 5 | 6 | 7 | 8 | Final |
| Sweden (Meldahl) | 3 | 0 | 1 | 0 | 0 | 6 | X | X | 11 |
| Japan (Tsuchiya) | 0 | 1 | 0 | 2 | 1 | 0 | X | X | 4 |

| Sheet F | 1 | 2 | 3 | 4 | 5 | 6 | 7 | 8 | Final |
| Italy (Macchiati) | 0 | 0 | 4 | 0 | 2 | 0 | 0 | 3 | 9 |
| Czech Republic (Danielisová) | 2 | 3 | 0 | 1 | 0 | 3 | 1 | 0 | 10 |

| Sheet G | 1 | 2 | 3 | 4 | 5 | 6 | 7 | 8 | Final |
| New Zealand (Becker) | 0 | 3 | 1 | 1 | 0 | 0 | 1 | 3 | 9 |
| Switzerland (Forrer) | 2 | 0 | 0 | 0 | 4 | 2 | 0 | 0 | 8 |

==== Thursday, April 19 ====
Draw 19 16:00

| Sheet C | 1 | 2 | 3 | 4 | 5 | 6 | 7 | 8 | Final |
| Czech Republic (Danielisová) | 1 | 0 | 3 | 0 | 1 | 0 | 1 | X | 6 |
| Switzerland (Forrer) | 0 | 3 | 0 | 2 | 0 | 2 | 0 | X | 7 |

| Sheet D | 1 | 2 | 3 | 4 | 5 | 6 | 7 | 8 | Final |
| Italy (Macchiati) | 0 | 3 | 1 | 0 | 1 | 0 | 0 | 1 | 6 |
| Slovakia (Jancariková) | 1 | 0 | 0 | 1 | 0 | 2 | 1 | 0 | 5 |

| Sheet E | 1 | 2 | 3 | 4 | 5 | 6 | 7 | 8 | Final |
| Japan (Tsuchiya) | 0 | 0 | 0 | 1 | 0 | 1 | 0 | X | 2 |
| New Zealand (Becker) | 3 | 1 | 2 | 0 | 2 | 0 | 2 | X | 10 |

== Tiebreaker ==
Friday, April 20, 9:00

| Sheet B | 1 | 2 | 3 | 4 | 5 | 6 | 7 | 8 | Final |
| Scotland (Watt) | 2 | 0 | 0 | 1 | 2 | 0 | 2 | 1 | 8 |
| United States (Oleinik) | 0 | 1 | 1 | 0 | 0 | 3 | 0 | 0 | 5 |

== Playoffs ==
Semifinals
Y1 | Canada | 7
R2 | New Zealand | 6
Y2 | Scotland | 9
R1 | Sweden | 5

Gold Medal Game
Y1 | Canada | 12
Y2 | Scotland | 2
Bronze Medal Game
R2 | New Zealand | 3
R1 | Sweden | 10

=== Semifinals ===
Saturday, April 21, 9:00

| Sheet C | 1 | 2 | 3 | 4 | 5 | 6 | 7 | 8 | Final |
| Canada (Hanlon) | 1 | 0 | 0 | 5 | 0 | 1 | 0 | 0 | 7 |
| New Zealand (Becker) | 0 | 2 | 1 | 0 | 1 | 0 | 1 | 1 | 6 |

| Sheet D | 1 | 2 | 3 | 4 | 5 | 6 | 7 | 8 | Final |
| Scotland (Watt) | 1 | 1 | 1 | 0 | 4 | 1 | 0 | 1 | 9 |
| Sweden (Meldahl) | 0 | 0 | 0 | 3 | 0 | 0 | 2 | 0 | 5 |

=== Bronze medal game ===
Saturday, April 21, 14:00

| Sheet A | 1 | 2 | 3 | 4 | 5 | 6 | 7 | 8 | Final |
| New Zealand (Becker) | 0 | 1 | 0 | 1 | 0 | 1 | 0 | X | 3 |
| Sweden (Meldahl) | 2 | 0 | 1 | 0 | 4 | 0 | 3 | X | 10 |

=== Gold medal game ===
Saturday, April 21, 14:00

| Sheet B | 1 | 2 | 3 | 4 | 5 | 6 | 7 | 8 | Final |
| Canada (Hanlon) | 2 | 0 | 2 | 0 | 3 | 2 | 3 | X | 12 |
| Scotland (Watt) | 0 | 1 | 0 | 1 | 0 | 0 | 0 | X | 2 |

2012 World Senior Women's Curling Championship Winner
(Canada)
Canada
8th title
