= Johnjo Kenny =

Irish male curler and coach

- Curler ♂
- Other names: John Kenny, John Jo Kenny
- Born: 9 February 1961 (age 65); Kinross, Scotland

Curling career
- Member Association: Scotland; Ireland
- World Championship: 1 (2006)
- European Championship: 6 (2004, 2005, 2006, 2009, 2010, 2011)
- Other appearances: World Mixed Championship: 1 (2015), European Mixed Championship: 7 (2006, 2007, 2008, 2009, 2010, 2012, 2013), World Senior Championships: 6 (2012, 2013, 2014, 2017, 2018, 2024)
Medal record
Curling
Representing Ireland
World Senior Championships
Gold medal – first place	2012 Tårnby
Bronze medal – third place	2017 Lethbridge

Johnjo Kenny (born 9 February 1961 in Kinross, Scotland) is a Scottish-Irish curler and curling coach.

== Teams ==
=== Men's ===
Season	Skip	Third	Second	Lead	Alternate	Coach	Events
1994–95	Johnjo Kenny	Martin Sutherland	David Clydesdale	Scott Gormley			SMCC
2004–05	Peter Wilson	Robin Gray	Johnjo Kenny	Peter J.D. Wilson	John Furey	Gordon McIntyre	ECC 2004 (12th)
2005–06	Douglas Dryburgh	Peter Wilson	Robin Gray	Johnjo Kenny	Peter J.D. Wilson		ECC 2005 (7th); WCC 2006 (12th)
2006–07	Robin Gray	Johnjo Kenny	Peter J.D. Wilson	Neil Fyfe	Tony Tierney		ECC 2006 (9th)
2009–10	Robin Gray	Peter Wilson	Johnjo Kenny	Neil Fyfe	Bill Gray	Peter J.D. Wilson	ECC 2009 (14th)
2010–11	Robin Gray	Johnjo Kenny	Bill Gray	Neil Fyfe	John Furey		ECC 2010 (13th)
2011–12	Robin Gray	Johnjo Kenny	Bill Gray	Neil Fyfe	John Furey		ECC 2011 (14th)
2011–12	Johnjo Kenny	Bill Gray	David Whyte	Tony Tierney	David Hume	Gordon McIntyre	WSCC 2012 (gold)
2012–13	Peter Wilson	Peter J.D. Wilson	Neil Fyfe	Tom Roche	Johnjo Kenny	Anne Wilson	WSCC 2013 (9th)
2013–14	Johnjo Kenny	Bill Gray	David Whyte	Tony Tierney	Neil Fyfe	Gordon McIntyre	WSCC 2014 (6th)
2016–17	Peter Wilson	Johnjo Kenny	Bill Gray	David Whyte	David Hume	Gillian Russell	WSCC 2017 (bronze)
2017–18	Johnjo Kenny	Bill Gray	Neil Fyfe	David Whyte	David Hume	Gillian Russell	WSCC 2018 (14th)

=== Mixed ===
Season	Skip	Third	Second	Lead	Alternate	Coach	Events
2006–07	Johnjo Kenny	Marie O'Kane	Tony Tierney	Mary Kerr			EMxCC 2006 (7th)
2007–08	Johnjo Kenny	Marie O'Kane	Tony Tierney	Mary Kerr			EMxCC 2007 (23rd)
2008–09	Johnjo Kenny	Marie O'Kane	Tony Tierney	Gillian Drury			EMxCC 2008 (16th)
2009–10	Johnjo Kenny	Marie O'Kane	Tony Tierney	Gillian Drury			EMxCC 2009 (15th)
2010–11	Johnjo Kenny	Marie O'Kane	David Smith	Gillian Drury	Tony Tierney		EMxCC 2010 (16th)
2012–13	Robin Gray	Louise Kerr	Johnjo Kenny	Hazel Gormley Leahy			EMxCC 2012 (10th)
2013–14	Robin Gray	Louise Kerr	Johnjo Kenny	Hazel Gormley Leahy		Bill Gray	EMxCC 2013 (18th)
2015–16	Johnjo Kenny	Marie O'Kane	Tony Tierney	Jen Ward			WMxCC 2015 (23rd)

== Record as a coach of national teams ==
Year	Tournament, event	National team	Place
2011	2011 World Senior Curling Championships	Ireland (senior women)	8
2019	2019 European Curling Championships (C Division)	Ireland (women)	5
