= Kienast =

Kienast is a surname. Notable people with the surname include:

- Alain Kienast also known as Alain Souchon (born 1944), a French singer and actor
- Brigitte Kienast, Swiss curler
- Reinhard Kienast (born 1959), an Austrian footballer, uncle of Roman
- Roman Kienast (born 1984), an Austrian footballer, nephew of Reinhard
