= Ann-Catrin Kjerr =

Swedish curler

- Curler ♀
- Born: 14 February 1949 (age 77); Sundbyberg, Sweden

Team
- Curling club: Stocksunds CK, Stockholm

Curling career
- Member Association: Sweden
- World Championship: 2 (1984, 1991)
- European Championship: 1 (1991)
- Olympic: 1 (1992) (demo)
- Other appearances: World Senior Championships: 11 (2004, 2005, 2006, 2007, 2008, 2009, 2010, 2011, 2012, 2013, 2014)
Medal record
Curling
World Championships
Bronze medal – third place	1991 Winnipeg
European Championships
Bronze medal – third place	1991 Chamonix
Swedish Women's Championship
Gold medal – first place	1984
World Senior Championships
Gold medal – first place	2006 Copenhagen
Gold medal – first place	2007 Edmonton
Silver medal – second place	2004 Gävle
Silver medal – second place	2011 St. Paul
Bronze medal – third place	2005 Greenacres
Bronze medal – third place	2009 Dunedin
Bronze medal – third place	2010 Chelyabinsk
Bronze medal – third place	2012 Tårnby
Bronze medal – third place	2013 Fredericton

Ann-Catrin Kjerr (born 14 February 1949) is a Swedish curler.

She is a 1991 World bronze medallist and 1991 European bronze medallist. She competed at the 1992 Winter Olympics when curling was a demonstration sport.

In 1988 she was inducted into the Swedish Curling Hall of Fame.

== Teams ==
Season	Skip	Third	Second	Lead	Alternate	Coach	!Events
1983–84	Ingrid Thidevall-Meldahl	Ann-Catrin Kjerr	Astrid Blomberg	Sylvia Malmberg			SWCC 1984 (gold); WCC 1984 (7th)
1990–91	Anette Norberg	Cathrine Norberg	Anna Rindeskog	Helene Granqvist	Ann-Catrin Kjerr		SWCC 1991 (gold); WCC 1991 (bronze)
1991–92	Anette Norberg	Anna Rindeskog	Cathrine Norberg	Helene Granqvist	Ann-Catrin Kjerr		ECC 1991 (bronze); OG 1992 (demo) (5th)
2003–04	Ingrid Meldahl	Ann-Catrin Kjerr	Inger Berg	Sylvia Malmberg	Birgitta Törn	Gunilla Bergman	WSCC 2004 (silver)
2004–05	Ingrid Meldahl	Ann-Catrin Kjerr	Inger Berg	Sylvia Malmberg	Birgitta Törn	Gunilla Bergman	WSCC 2005 (bronze)
2005–06	Ingrid Meldahl	Ann-Catrin Kjerr	Inger Berg	Sylvia Malmberg	Birgitta Törn	Gunilla Bergman	WSCC 2006 (gold)
2006–07	Ingrid Meldahl	Ann-Catrin Kjerr	Birgitta Törn	Inger Berg	Sylvia Liljefors	Gunilla Bergman	WSCC 2007 (gold)
2007–08	Ingrid Meldahl	Ann-Catrin Kjerr	Birgitta Törn	Sylvia Liljefors	Inger Berg	Gunilla Bergman	WSCC 2008 (6th)
2008–09	Ingrid Meldahl	Ann-Catrin Kjerr	Anta Hedström	Sylvia Liljefors	Gunilla Bergman		WSCC 2009 (bronze)
2009–10	Ingrid Meldahl	Ann-Catrin Kjerr	Anta Hedström	Sylvia Liljefors		Olof Liljefors	WSCC 2010 (bronze)
2010–11	Ingrid Meldahl	Ann-Catrin Kjerr	Anta Hedström	Sylvia Liljefors		Gunilla Bergman	WSCC 2011 (silver)
2011–12	Ingrid Meldahl	Ann-Catrin Kjerr	Anta Hedström	Sylvia Liljefors	Marie Lehander	Gunilla Bergman	WSCC 2012 (bronze)
2012–13	Ingrid Meldahl	Ann-Catrin Kjerr	Anta Hedström	Sylvia Liljefors	Marie Lehander	Jan-Erik Kjerr	WSCC 2013 (bronze)
2013–14	Ingrid Meldahl	Ann-Catrin Kjerr	Anta Hedström	Sylvia Liljefors	Marie Lehander	Gunilla Bergman	WSCC 2014 (4th)
