= 2012 World Curling Championships =

The 2012 World Curling Championships may refer to one of the following curling championships:

- 2012 World Men's Curling Championship
- 2012 Ford World Women's Curling Championship
- 2012 World Junior Curling Championships
- 2012 World Senior Curling Championships
- 2012 World Wheelchair Curling Championship
- 2012 World Mixed Doubles Curling Championship
