= 2013 World Curling Championships =

The 2013 World Curling Championships may refer to one of the following curling championships:

- 2013 Ford World Men's Curling Championship
- 2013 World Women's Curling Championship
- 2013 World Junior Curling Championships
- 2013 World Senior Curling Championships
- 2013 World Wheelchair Curling Championship
- 2013 World Mixed Doubles Curling Championship
