= Astrid Blomberg =

Swedish curler

- Curler ♀
- Born: 2 December 1937 (age 88)

Team
- Curling club: Stocksunds CK, Stockholm

Curling career
- Member Association: Sweden
- World Championship: 1 (1984)
Medal record
Curling
Swedish Women's Championship
Gold medal – first place	1984

Astrid Elisabet Blomberg (born 2 December 1937) is a Swedish curler.

== Teams ==
Season	Skip	Third	Second	Lead	Events
1983–84	Ingrid Thidevall-Meldahl	Ann-Catrin Kjerr	Astrid Blomberg	Sylvia Malmberg	SWCC 1984 (gold); WCC 1984 (7th)
