= 2012 World Senior Curling Championships =

- Host city: Tårnby, Denmark
- Arena: Tårnby Curling Club
- Dates: April 14–21
- Men's winner: Ireland
- Skip: John Jo Kenny
- Third: Bill Gray
- Second: David Whyte
- Lead: Tony Tierney
- Alternate: David Hume
- Finalist: Canada (Kelly Robertson)
- Women's winner: Canada
- Curling club: Thistle Saint Andrews CC; Saint John, New Brunswick
- Skip: Heidi Hanlon
- Third: Kathy Floyd
- Second: Judy Blanchard
- Lead: Jane Arseneau
- Finalist: Scotland (Barbara Watt)

The 2012 World Senior Curling Championships were held at the Tårnby Curling Club in Tårnby, Denmark from April 14 to 21. Tårnby has previously hosted the 2006 World Senior Curling Championships, the 2011 European Mixed Curling Championship, and the 2011 European Curling Championships' Group C competitions, and hosted the 2012 European Junior Curling Challenge. For the first time since 2009, the event was not held in conjunction with the same year's World Mixed Doubles Championship.

== Men ==
=== Round-robin standings ===
Final round-robin standings

Key
Teams to Playoffs
Teams to Draw Shot Challenge (team with best moves to playoffs, other two play in qualification game)
Teams to Tiebreaker (winner moves on to Draw Shot Challenge)

White Group	Skip	W	L
Canada	Kelly Robertson	6	0
New Zealand	Hans Frauenlob	4	2
Italy	Antonio Menardi	3	3
Scotland	Keith Prentice	3	3
Japan	Yutak Matsuura	3	3
Netherlands	Wim Neeleman	2	4
Hungary	Andras Rókusfalvy	0	6

Red Group	Skip	W	L
Ireland	John Jo Kenny	7	0
Finland	Timo Kauste	6	1
Switzerland	Karl Grossmann	4	3
England	Michael Sutherland	3	4
Latvia	Peteris Sveisbergs	3	4
United States	Ian Journeaux	3	4
Russia	Sergey Korolenko	1	6
Slovakia	Milan Kalis	0	7

Blue Group	Skip	W	L
Norway	Eigil Ramsfjell	6	1
Sweden	Connie Östlund	6	1
Australia	Hugh Millikin	6	1
Germany	Rainer Schöpp	4	3
Czech Republic	Petr Kovač	2	5
Austria	Ronald Niederhauser	2	5
Denmark	Hans Peter Schack	1	6
Wales	Chris Wells	1	6

=== Playoffs ===
Qualification Game
R3	Switzerland	5
W3	Scotland	6

Quarterfinals
W1	Canada	5
W3	Scotland	2
W2	New Zealand	4
B2	Sweden	5
B1	Norway	6
B3	Australia	3
R1	Ireland	8
R2	Finland	4

Semifinals
W1	Canada	9
B2	Sweden	5
B1	Norway	4
R1	Ireland	5

Gold-medal game
W1	Canada	5
R1	Ireland	6

Bronze-medal game
B1	Norway	4
B2	Sweden	8

==== Bronze-medal game ====
Saturday, April 21, 14:00

Sheet D	1	2	3	4	5	6	7	8	Final
Norway (Ramsfjell)	1	0	0	1	0	2	0	X	4
Sweden (Östlund) 🔨	0	0	3	0	3	0	2	X	8

==== Gold-medal game ====
Saturday, April 21, 14:00

Sheet C	1	2	3	4	5	6	7	8	9	Final
Canada (Robertson) 🔨	0	0	1	0	1	2	1	0	0	5
Ireland (Kenny)	0	0	0	4	0	0	0	1	1	6

2012 World Senior Men's Curling Championship Winner
Ireland
1st title

== Women ==
=== Round-robin standings ===
Final round-robin standings

Key
Teams to Playoffs
Teams to Tiebreaker

Yellow Group	Skip	W	L
Canada	Heidi Hanlon	6	0
Scotland	Barbara Watt	4	2
United States	Pam Oleinik	4	2
Ireland	Marie O'Kane	3	3
Denmark	Jane Bidstrup	2	4
Finland	Kirsti Kauste	1	5
Russia	Liudmila Murova	1	5

Rose Group	Skip	W	L
Sweden	Ingrid Meldahl	6	0
New Zealand	Wendy Becker	5	1
Switzerland	Chantal Forrer	4	2
Czech Republic	Ivana Danielisová	3	3
Japan	Mikiko Tsuchiya	2	4
Slovakia	Elena Jancariková	1	5
Italy	Lucilla Macchiati	1	5

=== Playoffs ===
Semifinals
Y1	Canada	7
R2	New Zealand	6
Y2	Scotland	9
R1	Sweden	5

Gold-medal game
Y1	Canada	12
Y2	Scotland	2

Bronze-medal game
R2	New Zealand	3
R1	Sweden	10

==== Bronze-medal game ====
Saturday, April 21, 14:00

Sheet A	1	2	3	4	5	6	7	8	Final
New Zealand (Becker)	0	1	0	1	0	1	0	X	3
Sweden (Meldahl) 🔨	2	0	1	0	4	0	3	X	10

==== Gold-medal game ====
Saturday, April 21, 14:00

Sheet B	1	2	3	4	5	6	7	8	Final
Canada (Hanlon) 🔨	2	0	2	0	3	2	3	X	12
Scotland (Watt)	0	1	0	1	0	0	0	X	2

2012 World Senior Women's Curling Championship Winner
(Canada)
Canada
8th title
