= 2007 World Senior Curling Championships =

- Host city: Edmonton, Canada
- Arena: Thistle Curling Club
- Dates: March 25–31
- Men's winner: Scotland
- Skip: Keith Prentice
- Third: Lockhart Steele
- Second: Tommy Fleming
- Lead: Robin Aitken
- Alternate: Archibald Craig
- Finalist: Canada
- Women's winner: Sweden
- Curling club: Stocksunds CK, Stockholm
- Skip: Ingrid Meldahl
- Third: Ann-Catrin Kjerr
- Second: Birgitta Törn
- Lead: Inger Berg
- Alternate: Sylvia Kiljefors
- Coach: Gunilla Bergman
- Finalist: Canada

The 2007 World Senior Curling Championships were held from March 25 to 31 at the Thistle Curling Club in Edmonton, Alberta, Canada. Scotland won the men's event and Sweden the women's.

Scotland's Keith Prentice rink won the men's event when Prentice "made a pretty amazing shot" by bumping back a buried Canadian stone on the button to score a point in the eighth and final end in the final.

== Men ==
=== Round Robin Standings ===
Group A	Skip	W	L
Scotland	Keith Prentice	6	0
Canada	Al Hackner	5	1
Finland	Timo Kauste	4	2
New Zealand	Peter Becker	3	3
England	D. Michael Sutherland	2	4
Switzerland	Mattias Neuenschwander	1	5
Ireland	Tony Tierney	1	5

Group B	Skip	W	L
Sweden	Claes Roxin	6	0
United States	Geoff Goodland	5	1
Japan	Satoru Asakawa	3	3
Germany	Klaus Unterstab	3	3
France	Maurice Arozamena	2	4
Wales	Peter Williams	2	4
Norway	Terje Oyen	0	6

=== Playoffs ===
Semi-final
Scotland	8
United States	6
Sweden	3
Canada	4

Final
Scotland	6
Canada	5
Bronze medal
United States	6
Sweden	7

== Women ==
=== Round Robin Standings ===
Country	Skip	W	L
Canada	Anne Dunn	10	0
United States	Pam Oleinik	8	2
Sweden	Ingrid Meldahl	7	3
Scotland	Carolyn Morris	6	4
Switzerland	Renate Nedkoff	6	4
England	Glynnice Lauder	6	4
Finland	Helena Timonen	4	6
Germany	Carola Murek-Rickmers	4	6
Ireland	Fiona Turnbull	2	8
Japan	Hideko Tanaka	1	9
New Zealand	Liz Matthews	1	9

=== Tiebreakers ===
- Switzerland 10-9 England
- Scotland 5-3 Switzerland

=== Playoffs ===
Semi-final
Canada	8
Scotland	6
United States	3
Sweden	7

Final
Canada	5
Sweden	8
Bronze medal
Scotland	8
United States	12
