= Evi Rüegsegger =

Swiss curler

- Curler ♀
- Other names: Evi Attinger

Team
- Curling club: CC Dübendorf, Dübendorf, CC Wetzikon, Wetzikon

Curling career
- Member Association: Switzerland
- World Championship: 1 (1984)
- European Championship: 2 (1978, 1984)
Medal record
Curling
World Championships
Silver medal – second place	1984 Perth
European Championships
Silver medal – second place	1978 Aviemore
Bronze medal – third place	1984 Morzine
Swiss Women's Championship
Gold medal – first place	1978
Gold medal – first place	1984

Evi Rüegsegger (also known as Evi Attinger) is a former Swiss curler.

She is a 1984 World women's silver medallist.

== Teams ==
Season	Skip	Third	Second	Lead	Events
1977–78	Heidi Attinger	Dorli Broger	Brigitte Kienast	Evi Rüegsegger	SWCC 1978 (gold)
1978–79	Heidi Neuenschwander	Dorli Broger	Brigitte Kienast	Evi Rüegsegger	ECC 1978 (silver)
1983–84	Brigitte Kienast	Irene Bürgi	Erika Frewein	Evi Rüegsegger	SWCC 1984 (gold); WCC 1984 (silver)
1984–85	Irene Bürgi	Isabelle Köpfli	Evi Attinger	Brigitte Kienast	ECC 1984 (bronze)
