= 2006 World Senior Curling Championships =

- Host city: Copenhagen, Denmark
- Arena: Tårnby Curling Club
- Dates: March 4–11
- Men's winner: Canada
- Skip: Les Rogers
- Third: Marvin Wirth
- Second: Ken Mclean
- Lead: Millard Evans
- Finalist: United States (Brian Simonson)
- Women's winner: Sweden
- Curling club: Stocksunds CK, Stockholm
- Skip: Ingrid Meldahl
- Third: Ann-Catrin Kjerr
- Second: Inger Berg
- Lead: Sylvia Malmberg
- Alternate: Birgitta Törn
- Coach: Gunilla Bergman
- Finalist: Canada (Joyce Potter)

The 2006 World Senior Curling Championships were held from March 4 to 11 at the Tårnby Curling Club in Copenhagen, Denmark.

Group A of each gender consisted of the best ranked countries from the previous year. The three best teams of the A-groups advanced to the semi-finals as well as the winner of the B-groups. The top ranked team in A will play against the top ranked team in B, the winner went on to the gold medal game and the loser went on to the bronze medal game. The 2nd place team in A played against the 3rd place team in A, and the winner went on to the gold medal game and the loser went on to the bronze medal game.

== Men ==
=== Teams ===
Country	Skip	Third	Second	Lead	Alternate	Coach	Curling club
Canada	Les Rogers	Marvin Wirth	Ken Mclean	Millard Evans			
Denmark	Allan Ploug (fourth)	Finn Nielsen	Palle Bork	Johannes Jensen (skip)	Ove O. Sørensen		Tårnby CC
England	D. Michael Sutherland	John Brown	John MacDougall	Robin Gemmell	Phil Barton		
Estonia	Leo Jakobson	Toomas Lill	Jüri Rouk	Sven Petermann			
Finland	Lauri Perkiö	Mauno Nummila	Antti Sundholm	Seppo Stark	Jorma Rinne		
Germany	Klaus Unterstab	Reinhard Oelschläger	Thomas Frey	Joachim Hagen	Werner Pflaum		
Iceland	Gisli Kristinsson	Hallgrimur Valsson	Agust Hilmarsson	Björn Sigmindsson	Eiríkur Bóasson		
Ireland	Tony Tierney	Jim Winning	John Burns	David McClure			
Japan	Akinori Kashiwagi	Teruo Moriizumi	Kazuyuki Tsuchiya	Kazuaki Tsuchiya	Michiaki Saito		
Norway	Tormod Andreassen	Sverre Sandbakken	Jan Kolstad	Olaf Carlem			
Scotland	Ronnie Peat	Allan MacLennan	Jim Jamieson	Michael Burton			
Sweden	Jan Ullsten	Björn Rudström	Lars Strandqvist	Lars Engblom			Härnösands CK
Switzerland	Peter Attinger Jr.	Mattias Neuenschwander	Bernhard Attinger	Tony Knobel	Fritz Widmer	Fritz Widmer	
United States	Brian Simonson	Tom Harms	John Kokotovich	Don Mohawk	Dale Gibbs		
Wales	Hugh Meikle (fourth)	Chris Wells (skip)	Michael Yuille	Hugh Hodge			

=== Round robin ===
==== Group A ====
Place	Team	1	2	3	4	5	6	7	8	Wins	Losses
1	Canada	*	8:2	5:4	8:3	10:2	8:2	5:2	7:2	7	0
2	United States	2:8	*	5:4	6:5	7:4	8:6	6:4	4:6	5	2
3	Sweden	4:5	4:5	*	4:7	8:2	8:5	6:4	9:3	4	3
4	Switzerland	3:8	5:6	7:4	*	7:6	6:5	2:8	3:4	3	4
5	England	2:10	4:7	2:8	6:7	*	5:2	8:7	10:3	3	4
6	Norway	2:8	6:8	5:8	5:6	2:5	*	6:5	11:2	2	5
7	Germany	2:5	4:6	4:6	8:2	7:8	5:6	*	8:3	2	5
8	Scotland	2:7	6:4	3:9	4:3	3:10	2:11	3:8	*	2	5

==== Group B ====
Place	Team	1	2	3	4	5	6	7	Wins	Losses
1	Denmark	*	8:6	3:9	10:4	10:5	11:2	9:3	5	1
2	Finland	6:8	*	9:2	7:9	7:6	11:5	13:2	4	2
3	Japan	9:3	2:9	*	10:3	2:8	5:4	11:7	4	2
4	Wales	4:10	9:7	3:10	*	8:7	8:2	12:1	4	2
5	Ireland	5:10	6:7	8:2	7:8	*	8:4	8:4	3	3
6	Iceland	2:11	5:11	4:5	2:8	4:8	*	8:2	1	5
7	Estonia	3:9	2:13	7:11	1:12	4:8	2:8	*	0	6

Teams to playoffs

=== Playoffs ===
Semi-final
A-1	Canada	9
B-1	Denmark	3
A-2	United States	7
A-3	Sweden	3

Final
Canada	9
United States	1
Bronze medal game
Denmark	6
Sweden	12

Semi-finals
March 10, 16:30

Sheet A	1	2	3	4	5	6	7	8	Final
Denmark									3
Canada 🔨									9

Sheet B	1	2	3	4	5	6	7	8	Final
United States 🔨									7
Sweden									3

Bronze medal game
March 11, 10:00

Sheet D	1	2	3	4	5	6	7	8	Final
Denmark 🔨	0	3	2	0	1	0	X	X	6
Sweden	2	0	0	6	0	4	X	X	12

Final
March 11, 14:00

Sheet D	1	2	3	4	5	6	7	8	Final
United States	0	0	1	0	0	0	X	X	1
Canada 🔨	0	2	0	0	3	4	X	X	9

=== Final standings ===
Place	Team	Games played	Wins	Losses
1st place, gold medalist(s)	Canada	9	9	0
2nd place, silver medalist(s)	United States	9	6	3
3rd place, bronze medalist(s)	Sweden	9	5	4
4	Denmark	8	5	3
5	Switzerland	7	3	4
6	England	7	3	4
7	Norway	7	2	5
8	Germany	7	2	5
9	Scotland	7	2	5
10	Finland	6	4	2
11	Japan	6	4	2
12	Wales	6	4	2
13	Ireland	6	3	3
14	Iceland	6	1	5
15	Estonia	6	0	6

== Women ==
=== Teams ===
Country	Skip	Third	Second	Lead	Alternate	Coach	Curling club
Canada	Joyce Potter	Muriel Potter	Janelle Sadler	Bonnie Morris			Rideau CC
Denmark	Kirsten Jensen	Lone Tordrup	Lone Christiansen	Dorthe Hansen			Tårnby CC
England	Glynnice Lauder	Venetia Scott	Hilary Bowyer	Moira Davison			
Finland	Mimmi Koivula	Helena Timonen	Kirsti Kauste	Terttu Pakarinen	Pirjo Hautanen		
Ireland	Fiona Turnbull	Jane Moira Paterson	Isobel Fyfe	Kathleen Nixon			
Japan	Noriko Kaneuchi	Reiko Nihommatsu	Hiroko Oishi	Miyako Sato			
Netherlands	Sylvia Van Der Pluijm	Els Neeleman	Wil Kerkvliet	Rose-Marie Berghuijs			
New Zealand	Liz Matthews	Wendy Becker	Christine Bewick	Cathy Fenton	Pauline Farra		
Scotland	Carolyn Morris	Pat Lockhart	Trudie Milne	Linda Lesperance			
Sweden	Ingrid Meldahl	Ann-Catrin Kjerr	Inger Berg	Sylvia Malmberg	Birgitta Törn	Gunilla Bergman	Stocksunds CK, Stockholm
Switzerland	Renate Nedkoff	Lotti Pieper	Silvia Niederer	Brigitta Keller	Irene Goridis		
United States	Jamie Hutchinson	Shelley Johnson	Carolyn MacLeod	Cheryl Pieske	Karen Gloyd		

=== Round robin ===
==== Group A ====
Place	Team	1	2	3	4	5	6	Wins	Losses
1	Canada	*	9:6	6:7	8:1	6:5	10:2	4	1
2	Switzerland	6:9	*	8:5	6:4	6:7	8:3	3	2
3	Sweden	7:6	5:8	*	5:7	7:4	11:3	3	2
4	Scotland	1:8	4:6	7:5	*	11:4	10:1	3	2
5	England	5:6	7:6	4:7	4:11	*	9:3	2	3
6	Japan	2:10	3:8	3:11	1:10	3:9	*	0	5

==== Group B ====
Place	Team	1	2	3	4	5	6	Wins	Losses
1	Ireland	*	11:3	8:2	6:5	8:7	5:8	4	1
2	Finland	3:11	*	8:3	4:5	8:5	8:4	3	2
3	Denmark	2:8	3:8	*	10:4	5:15	10:9	2	3
4	Netherlands	5:6	5:4	4:10	*	6:5	5:6	2	3
5	United States	7:8	5:8	15:5	5:6	*	9:1	2	3
6	New Zealand	8:5	4:8	9:10	6:5	1:9	*	2	3

Teams to playoffs
Teams to tiebreaker

==== Tiebreaker ====
March 10, 8:30

Sheet C	1	2	3	4	5	6	7	8	Final
Sweden 🔨	1	1	0	2	0	1	3	0	8
Scotland	0	0	1	0	3	0	0	0	4

=== Playoffs ===
Semi-final
A-1	Canada	9
B-1	Ireland	4
A-2	Switzerland	5
A-3	Sweden	8

Final
Canada	3
Sweden	7
Bronze medal game
Ireland	6
Switzerland	9

Semi-finals
March 10, 16:30

Sheet D	1	2	3	4	5	6	7	8	Final
Switzerland 🔨									5
Sweden									8

Sheet E	1	2	3	4	5	6	7	8	Final
Canada 🔨									9
Ireland									4

Bronze medal game
March 11, 10:00

Sheet B	1	2	3	4	5	6	7	8	Final
Ireland	2	0	1	0	2	0	1	X	6
Switzerland 🔨	0	2	0	3	0	4	0	X	9

Final
March 11, 14:00

Sheet B	1	2	3	4	5	6	7	8	Final
Sweden	0	0	1	1	1	1	1	2	7
Canada 🔨	0	3	0	0	0	0	0	0	3

=== Final standings ===
Place	Team	Games played	Wins	Losses
1st place, gold medalist(s)	Sweden	8	6	2
2nd place, silver medalist(s)	Canada	7	5	2
3rd place, bronze medalist(s)	Switzerland	7	4	3
4	Ireland	7	4	3
5	Scotland	6	3	3
6	England	5	2	3
7	Japan	5	0	5
8	Finland	5	3	2
9	Denmark	5	2	3
10	Netherlands	5	2	3
11	United States	5	2	3
12	New Zealand	5	2	3
