= 2020 World Senior Curling Championships =

- Host city: Kelowna, Canada
- Arena: Kelowna Curling Club
- Dates: April 18–25 (cancelled)

The 2020 World Senior Curling Championships was scheduled to be held from April 18 to 25 in Kelowna, Canada. On March 14, 2020 the event was cancelled due to the COVID-19 pandemic. The event was scheduled to be held in conjunction with the 2020 World Mixed Doubles Curling Championship.
