= 2004 World Senior Curling Championships =

- Host city: Gävle, Sweden
- Arena: Gavlerinken
- Dates: April 17–23
- Men's winner: Canada
- Skip: Bas Buckle
- Third: Bob Freeman
- Second: Gerry Young
- Lead: Harvey Holloway
- Finalist: United States (Bill Kind)
- Women's winner: Canada
- Skip: Anne Dunn
- Third: Lindy Marchuk
- Second: Gloria Campbell
- Lead: Fran Todd
- Alternate: Carol Thompson
- Finalist: Sweden (Ingrid Meldahl)

The 2004 World Senior Curling Championships were held from April 17 to 23 at the Gavlerinken arena in Gävle, Sweden.

The tournament was held in conjunction with the 2004 World Women's Curling Championship and the 2004 World Men's Curling Championship.

Canada nearly boycotted the event, due to a perceived lack of qualifying standards for other countries at the tournament.

== Men ==
=== Teams ===
Country	Skip	Third	Second	Lead	Alternate	Coach	Curling club
Canada	Bas Buckle	Bob Freeman	Gerry Young	Harvey Holloway			
Denmark	John Hansen	Alex Tordrup	Leif Højbjerg	Ole Bering			
England	D. Michael Sutherland	Eric Laidler	John MacDougall	Ronald Thwaites	Alistair Davison		
Finland	Lauri Perkiö	Mauno Nummila	Antti Sundholm	Seppo Stark	Olli Kallio		
France	Alain Contat	Jean-Pierre Bibollet	Bernard Grandjean	Robert Biondina			
Germany	Charlie Kapp	Karl-Dieter Schäfer	Anton Grief	Rudi Ibald	Klaus Unterstab	Beat Grimm	
Japan	Akinori Kashiwagi	Teruo Moriizumi	Kazuyuki Tsuchiya	Keiji Zareo	Michiaki Saito	Akira Tsuchiya	
Netherlands	Robert van der Cammen	Jaap Veerman	Gerrit-Jan Scholten	John Paulissen			
New Zealand	John Allen	Len McSaveney	Len Hill	Peter Taylor	Peter Becker		
Norway	Tormod Andreassen	Jan Kolstad	Sverre Sandbakken	Olaf Carlem			
Scotland	David Robertson	George Manson	Jim Stirling	Alan Guthrie	Hugh Stewart		
Sweden	Bertil Larson	Björn Anderstam	Bertil Löfgren	Lennart Ibsonius	Clas Jon-And		Sundbybergs CK
Switzerland	Mattias Neuenschwander	Michael Müller	Heinz Kneubühler	Fritz Widmer	Peter Schneeberger		
United States	Bill Kind	George Godfrey	Walter Erbach	Larry Sharp	Steve Brown		
Wales	Hugh Meikle	Chris Wells	Peter Williams	Ray King	Scott Lyon		

=== Round robin ===
==== Group A ====
Place	Team	1	2	3	4	5	6	7	8	Wins	Losses
1	Canada	*	8:4	6:4	7:6	7:3	12:2	12:1	13:2	7	0
2	Norway	4:8	*	6:3	11:0	7:2	8:1	14:2	12:7	6	1
3	Germany	4:6	3:6	*	8:2	8:5	10:6	13:0	14:2	5	2
4	Denmark	6:7	0:11	2:8	*	11:6	6:5	11:3	14:2	4	3
5	England	3:7	2:7	5:8	6:11	*	12:7	6:5	13:2	3	4
6	Japan	2:12	1:8	6:10	5:6	7:12	*	8:3	13:3	2	5
7	France	1:12	2:14	0:13	3:11	5:6	3:8	*	8:3	1	6
8	New Zealand	2:13	7:12	2:14	2:14	2:13	3:13	3:8	*	0	7

==== Group B ====
Place	Team	1	2	3	4	5	6	7	Wins	Losses
1	United States	*	5:4	6:4	3:5	8:5	13:0	8:3	5	1
2	Switzerland	4:5	*	5:2	4:3	8:4	5:3	8:3	5	1
3	Sweden	4:6	2:5	*	8:3	8:4	7:3	9:4	4	2
4	Scotland	5:3	3:4	3:8	*	7:6	11:7	8:2	4	2
5	Finland	5:8	4:8	4:8	6:7	*	6:5	2:8	1	5
6	Netherlands	0:13	3:5	3:7	7:11	5:6	*	9:8	1	5
7	Wales	3:8	3:8	4:9	2:8	8:2	8:9	*	1	5

Teams to playoffs

=== Classification games for 5–14 places ===
April 21, 12:00

For 5th place

Sheet D	1	2	3	4	5	6	7	8	Final
Germany 🔨	0	0	0	0	1	1	1	0	3
Sweden	0	2	2	0	0	0	0	3	7

For 7th place

Sheet E	1	2	3	4	5	6	7	8	Final
Scotland	1	0	2	0	0	0	0	X	3
Denmark 🔨	0	3	0	2	1	1	1	X	8

For 9th place

Sheet C	1	2	3	4	5	6	7	8	Final
Finland	0	0	3	0	0	2	0	2	7
England 🔨	1	1	0	2	1	0	1	0	6

For 11th place

Sheet B	1	2	3	4	5	6	7	8	9	Final
Japan	0	1	1	2	1	1	0	0	3	9
Netherlands 🔨	3	0	0	0	0	0	2	0	0	6

For 13th place

Sheet A	1	2	3	4	5	6	7	8	Final
Wales	0	2	3	2	2	1	X	X	10
France 🔨	3	0	0	0	0	0	X	X	3

=== Playoffs ===
Semi-final
A-1	Canada	9
B-2	Switzerland	6
B-1	United States	7
A-2	Norway	3

Final
Canada	8
United States	3
Bronze medal game
Switzerland	8
Norway	4

Semi-finals
April 22, 17:00

Sheet D	1	2	3	4	5	6	7	8	Final
United States 🔨	2	1	0	2	1	1	0	0	7
Norway	0	0	2	0	0	0	1	0	3

Sheet E	1	2	3	4	5	6	7	8	Final
Switzerland	0	2	0	2	0	2	0	X	6
Canada 🔨	3	0	2	0	2	0	2	X	9

Bronze medal game
April 23, 11:00

Sheet A	1	2	3	4	5	6	7	8	Final
Norway 🔨	1	0	0	1	0	2	0	0	4
Switzerland	0	0	3	0	2	0	1	2	8

Final
April 23, 11:00

Sheet C	1	2	3	4	5	6	7	8	Final
United States	0	0	2	0	1	0	0	0	3
Canada 🔨	1	3	0	1	0	2	0	1	8

=== Final standings ===
Place	Team	Games played	Wins	Losses
1st place, gold medalist(s)	Canada	9	9	0
2nd place, silver medalist(s)	United States	8	6	2
3rd place, bronze medalist(s)	Switzerland	8	6	2
4	Norway	9	6	3
5	Sweden	7	5	2
6	Germany	8	5	3
7	Denmark	8	5	3
8	Scotland	7	4	3
9	Finland	7	2	5
10	England	8	3	5
11	Japan	8	3	5
12	Netherlands	7	1	6
13	Wales	7	2	5
14	France	8	1	7
15	New Zealand	7	0	7

== Women ==
=== Teams ===
Country	Skip	Third	Second	Lead	Alternate	Coach	Curling club
Canada	Anne Dunn	Lindy Marchuk	Gloria Campbell	Fran Todd	Carol Thompson		Galt Country Club, Cambridge
England	Joan Reed	Glynnice Lauder	Venetia Scott	Moira Davison			Glendale CC, Northumberland
Finland	Helena Timonen	Mimmi Koivula	Pirjo Hautanen	Kirsti Kauste	Irma Elfvengren		
Germany	Karin Diekmann	Carola Murek	Brigitte Harmsen	Gisela Horn-Moll			
Japan	Hatomi Nagaoka	Reiko Nihommatsu	Noriko Kaneuchi	Hiroko Oishi			
New Zealand	Liz Matthews	Christine Bewick	Pauline Farra	Cathy Fenton	Lois Allan		
Scotland	Kirsty Letton	Judy MacKenzie	Pat Orr	Anne MacDougall	Anne Airey		
Sweden	Ingrid Meldahl	Ann-Catrin Kjerr	Inger Berg	Sylvia Malmberg	Birgitta Törn	Gunilla Bergman	Stocksunds CK, Stockholm
Switzerland	Renate Nedkoff	Lotti Pieper	Irene Goridis	Brigitta Keller	Silvia Niederer		
United States	Nancy Dinsdale	Anne Wiggins	Anne Robertson	Jan Stahlheber	Rosemary Morgan	Darryl Dinsdale	

=== Round robin ===
Place	Team	1	2	3	4	5	6	7	8	9	10	Wins	Losses
1	United States	*	8:2	6:7	5:10	7:5	12:5	10:4	7:6	13:0	13:4	7	2
2	Sweden	2:8	*	9:2	8:7	5:7	14:3	5:4	7:5	10:7	13:0	7	2
3	England	7:6	2:9	*	8:5	8:5	3:11	5:6	6:4	10:5	9:2	6	3
4	Canada	10:5	7:8	5:8	*	14:6	5:6	8:5	8:4	11:2	14:4	6	3
5	Switzerland	5:7	7:5	5:8	6:14	*	10:1	10:2	5:11	10:2	15:1	5	4
6	Japan	5:12	3:14	11:3	6:5	1:10	*	10:4	2:8	14:3	11:4	5	4
7	Finland	4:10	4:5	6:5	5:8	2:10	4:10	*	8:2	11:3	9:1	4	5
8	Scotland	6:7	5:7	4:6	4:8	11:5	8:2	2:8	*	12:2	14:6	4	5
9	Germany	0:13	7:10	5:10	2:11	2:10	3:14	3:11	2:12	*	10:3	1	8
10	New Zealand	4:13	0:13	2:9	4:14	1:15	4:11	1:9	6:14	3:10	*	0	9

Teams to playoffs

=== Playoffs ===
Semi-final
1	United States	4
4	Canada	11
2	Sweden	10
3	England	4

Final
Canada	8
Sweden	5
Bronze medal game
United States	7
England	6

Semi-finals
April 22, 17:00

Sheet A	1	2	3	4	5	6	7	8	Final
England 🔨	1	0	2	0	0	1	0	X	4
Sweden	0	4	0	1	2	0	3	X	10

Sheet B	1	2	3	4	5	6	7	8	Final
United States	0	1	0	2	0	1	0	X	4
Canada 🔨	1	0	3	0	3	0	4	X	11

Bronze medal game
April 23, 11:00

Sheet E	1	2	3	4	5	6	7	8	Final
United States 🔨	0	0	3	0	0	1	3	0	7
England	1	2	0	1	1	0	0	1	6

Final
April 23, 11:00

Sheet D	1	2	3	4	5	6	7	8	Final
Canada 🔨	0	2	0	0	3	1	0	2	8
Sweden	1	0	1	1	0	0	2	0	5

=== Final standings ===
Place	Team	Games played	Wins	Losses
1st place, gold medalist(s)	Canada	11	8	3
2nd place, silver medalist(s)	Sweden	11	8	3
3rd place, bronze medalist(s)	United States	11	8	3
4	England	11	6	5
5	Switzerland	9	5	4
6	Japan	9	5	4
7	Finland	9	4	5
8	Scotland	9	4	5
9	Germany	9	1	8
10	New Zealand	9	0	9
