= Cheryl Noble =

Canadian curler and Olympic medalist

- Curler
- Born: September 29, 1956 (age 70); Victoria, British Columbia, Canada
Medal record
Women's curling
Representing Canada
Olympic Games
Bronze medal – third place	2002 Salt Lake City
World Championships
Gold medal – first place	2000 Glasgow
World Senior Championships
Gold medal – first place	2009 Dunedin
Gold medal – first place	2011 St. Paul
Representing British Columbia
Scotties Tournament of Hearts
Silver medal – second place	2001 Sudbury
Bronze medal – third place	2005 St. John's

Cheryl Noble (born September 29, 1956) is a Canadian curler, winning a gold medal at the 2000 World Championships and winning a bronze medal at the 2002 Winter Olympics.

She won the 2008 and 2010 Canadian Senior Championships and the 2009 and 2011 World Senior Championships.
