= 1984 World Women's Curling Championship =

- Host city: Perth, Scotland
- Arena: Perth Ice Arena
- Dates: 25–30 March
- Winner: Canada
- Curling club: Fort Rouge CC, Winnipeg, Manitoba
- Skip: Connie Laliberte
- Third: Chris More
- Second: Corinne Peters
- Lead: Janet Arnott
- Finalist: Switzerland (Brigitte Kienast)

The 1984 World Women's Curling Championship, the women's world curling championship, was held from 25 to 30 March at the Perth Ice Arena in Perth, Scotland.

== Teams ==
Canada	Denmark	France	Germany	Italy
Fort Rouge CC, Winnipeg Skip: Connie Laliberte; Third: Chris More; Second: Corinne Peters; Lead: Janet Arnott	Hvidovre CC, Hvidovre Skip: Jane Bidstrup; Third: Iben Larsen; Second: Mai-Brit Rejnholdt-Christensen; Lead: Kirsten Hur	Mont d'Arbois CC, Megève Fourth: Huguette Jullien; Third: Agnes Mercier; Second: Andrée Dupont-Roc; Skip: Paulette Sulpice	EV Oberstdorf, Oberstdorf Skip: Almut Hege; Third: Josefine Einsle; Second: Suzanne Koch; Lead: Petra Tschetsch	Cortina CC, Cortina d'Ampezzo Skip: Maria-Grazzia Constantini; Third: Tea Valt; Second: Nelia Alvera; Lead: Angela Constantini
Norway	Scotland	Sweden	Switzerland	United States
Asker CC, Oslo Skip: Ellen Githmark; Third: Ingvill Githmark; Second: Heidi Throndsen; Lead: Anka Sunde Andreassen	Ayr CC, Ayr Skip: Sadie Anderson; Third: Annie Kennedy; Second: Martha McFadzean; Lead: Jessie Brown	Stocksunds CK, Stockholm Skip: Ingrid Thidevall-Meldahl; Third: Ann-Catrin Kjerr; Second: Astrid Blomberg; Lead: Sylvia Malmberg	Wetzikon CC, Wetzikon Skip: Brigitte Kienast; Third: Irene Bürgi; Second: Erika Frewein; Lead: Evi Rüegsegger	Duluth CC, Duluth, Minnesota Skip: Amy Hatten; Third: Terry Ann Leksell; Second: Karen Lee Leksell; Lead: Kelly Joy Sieger

== Round-robin standings ==
Key
Teams to playoffs
Teams to tiebreaker

Country	Skip	W	L
Canada	Connie Laliberte	8	1
Germany	Almut Hege	6	3
Norway	Ellen Githmark	5	4
Denmark	Jane Bidstrup	5	4
Scotland	Sadie Anderson	5	4
Switzerland	Brigitte Kienast	5	4
France	Paulette Sulpice	5	4
Sweden	Ingrid Thidevall-Meldahl	5	4
United States	Amy Hatten	1	8
Italy	Maria-Grazzia Constantini	0	9

== Round-robin results ==
=== Draw 1 ===
Team	Final
Scotland (Anderson)	11
France (Sulpice)	5

Team	Final
United States (Hatten)	4
Sweden (Thidevall-Meldahl)	8

Team	Final
Norway (Githmark)	9
Italy (Constantini)	2

Team	Final
Switzerland (Kienast)	3
Canada (Laliberte)	5

Team	Final
Germany (Hege)	8
Denmark (Bidstrup)	2

=== Draw 2 ===
Team	Final
Germany (Hege)	6
United States (Hatten)	5

Team	Final
Italy (Constantini)	4
Denmark (Bidstrup)	9

Team	Final
Scotland (Anderson)	7
Switzerland (Kienast)	5

Team	Final
Norway (Githmark)	3
France (Sulpice)	5

Team	Final
Sweden (Thidevall-Meldahl)	6
Canada (Laliberte)	11

=== Draw 3 ===
Team	Final
Canada (Laliberte)	8
Denmark (Bidstrup)	2

Team	Final
France (Sulpice)	6
Switzerland (Kienast)	4

Team	Final
Sweden (Thidevall-Meldahl)	7
Germany (Hege)	6

Team	Final
Italy (Constantini)	1
Scotland (Anderson)	7

Team	Final
Norway (Githmark)	6
United States (Hatten)	5

=== Draw 4 ===
Team	Final
France (Sulpice)	6
Sweden (Thidevall-Meldahl)	7

Team	Final
Norway (Githmark)	7
Scotland (Anderson)	6

Team	Final
United States (Hatten)	4
Denmark (Bidstrup)	9

Team	Final
Canada (Laliberte)	3
Germany (Hege)	4

Team	Final
Switzerland (Kienast)	6
Italy (Constantini)	5

=== Draw 5 ===
Team	Final
Norway (Githmark)	7
Germany (Hege)	8

Team	Final
Sweden (Thidevall-Meldahl)	8
Italy (Constantini)	3

Team	Final
France (Sulpice)	4
Canada (Laliberte)	7

Team	Final
United States (Hatten)	3
Switzerland (Kienast)	6

Team	Final
Denmark (Bidstrup)	4
Scotland (Anderson)	7

=== Draw 6 ===
Team	Final
Denmark (Bidstrup)	7
Switzerland (Kienast)	10

Team	Final
Scotland (Anderson)	4
Canada (Laliberte)	7

Team	Final
Italy (Constantini)	3
United States (Hatten)	7

Team	Final
Sweden (Thidevall-Meldahl)	4
Norway (Githmark)	7

Team	Final
France (Sulpice)	7
Germany (Hege)	3

=== Draw 7 ===
Team	Final
United States (Hatten)	2
Scotland (Anderson)	8

Team	Final
Denmark (Bidstrup)	8
France (Sulpice)	3

Team	Final
Switzerland (Kienast)	8
Sweden (Thidevall-Meldahl)	3

Team	Final
Germany (Hege)	7
Italy (Constantini)	2

Team	Final
Canada (Laliberte)	6
Norway (Githmark)	5

=== Draw 8 ===
Team	Final
Italy (Constantini)	2
Canada (Laliberte)	11

Team	Final
Switzerland (Kienast)	6
Germany (Hege)	4

Team	Final
Denmark (Bidstrup)	8
Norway (Githmark)	5

Team	Final
France (Sulpice)	8
United States (Hatten)	2

Team	Final
Scotland (Anderson)	5
Sweden (Thidevall-Meldahl)	12

=== Draw 9 ===
Team	Final
Switzerland (Kienast)	4
Norway (Githmark)	11

Team	Final
Canada (Laliberte)	7
United States (Hatten)	6

Team	Final
Germany (Hege)	6
Scotland (Anderson)	5

Team	Final
Denmark (Bidstrup)	8
Sweden (Thidevall-Meldahl)	7

Team	Final
Italy (Constantini)	3
France (Sulpice)	11

== Tiebreakers ==
=== Round 1 ===
Team	Final
France (Sulpice)	5
Norway (Githmark)	6

Team	Final
Switzerland (Kienast)	6
Sweden (Thidevall-Meldahl)	4

=== Round 2 ===
Team	Final
Denmark (Bidstrup)	4
Norway (Githmark)	9

Team	Final
Switzerland (Kienast)	6
Scotland (Anderson)	4

== Playoffs ==
Semifinals
1	Canada	8
4	Norway	6
2	Germany	7
3	Switzerland	8

Final
1	Canada	10
3	Switzerland	0

=== Semifinals ===
Team	Final
Canada (Laliberte)	8
Norway (Githmark)	6

Team	Final
Switzerland (Kienast)	8
Germany (Hege)	7

=== Final ===
Team	Final
Canada (Laliberte)	10
Switzerland (Kienast)	0

1984 World Women's Curling Championship
(Canada)
Canada
2nd title
