= Erika Frewein =

Swiss curler

- Curler ♀

Team
- Curling club: CC Wetzikon, Wetzikon

Curling career
- Member Association: Switzerland
- World Championship: 1 (1984)
Medal record
Curling
World Championships
Silver medal – second place	1984 Perth
Swiss Women's Championship
Gold medal – first place	1984

Erika Frewein is a former Swiss curler.

She is a 1984 World women's silver medallist.

== Teams ==
Season	Skip	Third	Second	Lead	Events
1983–84	Brigitte Kienast	Irene Bürgi	Erika Frewein	Evi Rüegsegger	SWCC 1984 (gold); WCC 1984 (silver)
