= 2009 World Senior Curling Championships =

- Host city: Dunedin, New Zealand
- Arena: Dunedin Curling Club
- Dates: April 24–May 3
- Men's winner: Canada
- Curling club: Humboldt CC, Humboldt, Saskatchewan
- Skip: Eugene Hritzuk
- Third: Kevin Kalthoff
- Second: Verne Anderson
- Lead: Dave Folk
- Finalist: United States
- Women's winner: Canada
- Curling club: Juan de Fuca CC, Colwood, British Columbia
- Skip: Pat Sanders
- Third: Cheryl Noble
- Second: Roselyn Craig
- Lead: Christine Jurgenson
- Finalist: Switzerland

The 2009 World Senior Curling Championships were held from April 24 to May 3 at the Dunedin Curling Club in Dunedin, New Zealand.

== Men ==
=== Teams ===
==== Group A ====
Country	Skip	Third	Second	Lead
Australia	Ted Bassett	Dave Thomas	Ali Cameron	Nick Sheard
Canada	Eugene Hritzuk	Kevin Kalthoff	Verne Anderson	Dave Folk
England	John Brown	Phil Barton	John MacDougall	Robin Gemmell
Hungary	András Rokusfalvy	Mihaly Veraszto	Laszlo Tolnai	Gyorgy Kalmar
Japan	Masayasu Sato	Tomiyasu Goshima	Takahiro Hashimoto	Shozo Itoh
Scotland	Keith Prentice	Lockhart Steele	Robin Aitken	Tommy Fleming

==== Group B ====
Country	Skip	Third	Second	Lead
Finland	Mauno Nummila	Juhani Heinonen	Paavo Ruottu	Martti Salonen
Italy	Carlo Carrera	Adriano Casagranda	Bruno Paolo Mosca	Mauro Coda Zabetta
New Zealand	Peter Becker	Richard Morgan	Nelson Ede	David Greer
Sweden	Karl Nordlund	Wolger Johansson	Per-Arne Andersson	Owe Larsson
Switzerland	André Pauli	Fritz Pulfer	Pierre Zürcher	Daniel Grünenfelder
United States	Paul Pustovar	Brian Simonson	Tom Harms	Don Mohawk

=== Round-robin standings ===
Group A	Skip	W	L
Canada	Eugene Hritzuk	5	0
Scotland	Keith Prentice	4	1
Japan	Masayasu Sato	3	2
Australia	Ted Bassett	2	3
Hungary	András Rokusfalvy	1	4
England	John Brown	0	5

Group B	Skip	W	L
United States	Paul Pustovar	5	0
Switzerland	André Pauli	4	1
Sweden	Karl Nordlund	3	2
Finland	Mauno Nummila	2	3
New Zealand	Peter Becker	1	4
Italy	Carlo Carrera	0	5

=== Results ===
==== Group A ====
===== Draw 1 =====
Sheet A	1	2	3	4	5	6	7	8	Final
Japan (Sato) 🔨	4	0	0	2	0	1	3	X	10
England (Brown)	0	0	1	0	1	0	0	X	2

Sheet B	1	2	3	4	5	6	7	8	Final
Hungary (Rokusfalvy) 🔨	3	0	1	0	1	0	1	0	6
Australia (Bassett)	0	1	0	2	0	4	0	1	8

Sheet E	1	2	3	4	5	6	7	8	Final
Canada (Hritzuk)	0	1	3	0	0	1	0	1	6
Scotland (Prentice) 🔨	3	0	0	1	0	0	1	0	5

===== Draw 2 =====
Sheet B	1	2	3	4	5	6	7	8	Final
Scotland (Prentice) 🔨	3	3	0	1	3	0	X	X	10
England (Brown)	0	0	1	0	0	1	X	X	2

Sheet C	1	2	3	4	5	6	7	8	Final
Japan (Sato)	0	1	2	1	0	1	1	0	6
Australia (Bassett) 🔨	3	0	0	0	1	0	0	1	5

Sheet D	1	2	3	4	5	6	7	8	Final
Hungary (Rokusfalvy)	0	0	0	0	0	0	1	X	1
Canada (Hritzuk) 🔨	0	4	0	2	0	2	0	X	8

===== Draw 3 =====
Sheet A	1	2	3	4	5	6	7	8	Final
England (Brown) 🔨	2	0	2	1	1	0	0	0	6
Hungary (Rokusfalvy)	0	2	0	0	0	2	1	2	7

Sheet B	1	2	3	4	5	6	7	8	Final
Australia (Bassett) 🔨	0	0	0	1	0	0	X	X	1
Canada (Hritzuk)	3	1	4	0	4	1	X	X	13

Sheet D	1	2	3	4	5	6	7	8	Final
Scotland (Prentice) 🔨	0	4	1	0	0	3	1	X	9
Japan (Sato)	0	0	0	2	0	0	0	X	2

===== Draw 4 =====
Sheet A	1	2	3	4	5	6	7	8	Final
Scotland (Prentice)	0	1	0	1	0	3	0	1	6
Australia (Bassett) 🔨	0	0	2	0	1	0	1	0	4

Sheet C	Final
England (Brown)	2
Canada (Hritzuk)	10

Sheet E	1	2	3	4	5	6	7	8	Final
Japan (Sato) 🔨	1	0	1	1	0	5	0	X	8
Hungary (Rokusfalvy)	0	1	0	0	1	0	1	X	3

===== Draw 5 =====
Sheet A	1	2	3	4	5	6	7	8	Final
Canada (Hritzuk)	2	1	1	1	0	3	0	X	8
Japan (Sato) 🔨	0	0	0	0	1	0	1	X	2

Sheet C	1	2	3	4	5	6	7	8	Final
Hungary (Rokusfalvy)	0	0	1	0	1	0	0	X	2
Scotland (Prentice) 🔨	4	0	0	2	0	2	1	X	9

Sheet D	Final
Australia (Bassett)	8
England (Brown)	5

==== Group B ====
===== Draw 1 =====
Sheet C	1	2	3	4	5	6	7	8	Final
Sweden (Nordlund)	0	0	2	0	0	0	0	X	2
United States (Pustovar) 🔨	0	1	0	2	2	1	1	X	7

Sheet D	1	2	3	4	5	6	7	8	Final
Switzerland (Pauli) 🔨	1	0	0	2	0	1	0	2	6
Finland (Nummila)	0	1	2	0	1	0	1	0	5

Sheet E	1	2	3	4	5	6	7	8	Final
Italy (Carrera)	4	0	0	1	0	0	0	0	5
New Zealand (Becker) 🔨	0	3	1	0	1	1	1	1	8

===== Draw 2 =====
Sheet A	1	2	3	4	5	6	7	8	Final
Switzerland (Pauli)	0	1	2	1	2	1	0	X	7
New Zealand (Becker) 🔨	2	0	0	0	0	0	2	X	4

Sheet E	1	2	3	4	5	6	7	8	Final
United States (Pustovar) 🔨	0	1	1	0	2	1	1	X	6
Finland (Nummila)	1	0	0	3	0	0	0	X	4

===== Draw 3 =====
Sheet A	1	2	3	4	5	6	7	8	Final
Sweden (Nordlund) 🔨	2	0	1	1	2	1	1	X	8
New Zealand (Becker)	0	2	0	0	0	0	0	X	2

Sheet B	1	2	3	4	5	6	7	8	Final
Finland (Nummila)	1	0	2	0	3	0	1	0	7
Italy (Carrera) 🔨	0	1	0	1	0	2	0	1	5

Sheet D	1	2	3	4	5	6	7	8	Final
Switzerland (Pauli)	1	0	0	1	0	2	0	1	5
United States (Pustovar) 🔨	0	0	2	0	2	0	2	0	6

===== Draw 4 =====
Sheet A	1	2	3	4	5	6	7	8	Final
Finland (Nummila)	0	0	0	1	0	0	2	1	4
Sweden (Nordlund) 🔨	0	1	1	0	3	1	0	0	6

Sheet C	1	2	3	4	5	6	7	8	9	Final
United States (Pustovar)	1	0	3	0	2	0	1	0	1	8
New Zealand (Becker) 🔨	0	2	0	1	0	1	0	3	0	7

Sheet E	1	2	3	4	5	6	7	8	Final
Switzerland (Pauli) 🔨	1	3	0	0	0	2	0	X	6
Italy (Carrera)	0	0	1	0	0	0	1	X	2

===== Draw 5 =====
Sheet A	1	2	3	4	5	6	7	8	Final
Sweden (Nordlund)	0	0	2	0	1	0	0	0	3
Switzerland (Pauli) 🔨	0	1	0	2	0	0	0	1	4

Sheet C	1	2	3	4	5	6	7	8	Final
New Zealand (Becker)	0	0	0	1	0	1	0	X	2
Finland (Nummila) 🔨	1	1	1	0	2	0	2	X	7

Sheet D	1	2	3	4	5	6	7	8	Final
Italy (Carrera)	0	0	0	2	0	0	X	X	2
United States (Pustovar) 🔨	2	0	3	0	1	1	X	X	7

=== Playoffs ===
Semi-final
A1	Canada	8
B2	Switzerland	7
B1	United States	6
A2	Scotland	5

Final
A1	Canada	4
B1	United States	3
Bronze medal
B2	Switzerland	3
A2	Scotland	9

==== Semifinals ====
Sheet A	1	2	3	4	5	6	7	8	9	Final
United States (Pustovar)	0	0	0	2	0	1	0	2	1	6
Scotland (Prentice) 🔨	0	1	0	0	2	0	2	0	0	5

Sheet B	1	2	3	4	5	6	7	8	Final
Canada (Hritzuk)	2	0	2	2	0	2	0	0	8
Switzerland (Pauli) 🔨	0	3	0	0	1	0	2	1	7

==== Bronze-medal game ====
Sheet B	1	2	3	4	5	6	7	8	Final
Switzerland (Pauli) 🔨	0	0	2	0	1	0	X	X	3
Scotland (Prentice)	2	1	0	5	0	1	X	X	9

==== Final ====
Sheet D	1	2	3	4	5	6	7	8	Final
Canada (Hritzuk)	0	0	0	1	1	1	0	1	4
United States (Pustovar) 🔨	1	0	1	0	0	0	1	0	3

== Women ==
=== Teams ===
Country	Skip	Third	Second	Lead
Canada	Pat Sanders	Cheryl Noble	Roselyn Craig	Christine Jurgenson
Italy	Lucilla Macchiati	Mafalda Hauseberger	Caterina Colucci	Paola Gancia
Japan	Hideko Tanaka	Naomi Kawano	Kazuko Takahshi	Mieko Nakamura
New Zealand	Wendy Becker	Christine Bewick	Pauline Farra	Liz Matthews
Scotland	Marion Craig	Rhona Fleming	Catherine Raeburn	Anne Malcolm
Sweden	Ingrid Meldahl	Ann-Catrin Kjerr	Anta Hedström	Sylvia Liljefors
Switzerland	Renate Nedkoff	Lotti Pieper	Silvia Niederer	Brigitta Keller
United States	Sharon Vukich	Joan Fish	Cathie Tomlinson	Aija Edwards

=== Round-robin standings ===
Country	Skip	W	L
Canada	Pat Sanders	7	0
Switzerland	Renate Nedkoff	5	2
Scotland	Marion Craig	4	3
Sweden	Ingrid Meldahl	4	3
Japan	Hideko Tanaka	3	4
United States	Sharon Vukich	3	4
New Zealand	Wendy Becker	2	5
Italy	Lucilla Macchiati	0	7

=== Results ===
==== Draw 1 ====
Sheet A	1	2	3	4	5	6	7	8	Final
Scotland (Craig)	0	3	0	2	0	0	1	0	6
Japan (Tanaka) 🔨	1	0	1	0	3	1	0	2	8

Sheet B	1	2	3	4	5	6	7	8	Final
Sweden (Meldahl)	2	3	4	1	4	1	X	X	15
Italy (Macchiati) 🔨	0	0	0	0	0	0	X	X	0

Sheet C	1	2	3	4	5	6	7	8	Final
United States (Vukich) 🔨	0	2	1	0	2	0	2	1	8
New Zealand (Becker)	1	0	0	2	0	1	0	0	4

Sheet D	1	2	3	4	5	6	7	8	Final
Switzerland (Nedkoff)	0	0	0	1	0	0	1	X	2
Canada (Sanders) 🔨	0	3	1	0	0	4	0	X	8

==== Draw 2 ====
Sheet B	1	2	3	4	5	6	7	8	Final
Canada (Sanders) 🔨	0	1	1	1	0	2	0	1	6
Japan (Tanaka)	0	0	0	0	1	0	3	0	4

Sheet C	1	2	3	4	5	6	7	8	Final
Switzerland (Nedkoff) 🔨	0	1	2	1	1	1	1	X	7
Scotland (Craig)	1	0	0	0	0	0	0	X	1

Sheet D	1	2	3	4	5	6	7	8	Final
Italy (Macchiati)	0	0	0	4	0	1	0	1	6
New Zealand (Becker) 🔨	3	2	2	0	1	0	2	0	10

Sheet E	1	2	3	4	5	6	7	8	Final
Sweden (Meldahl) 🔨	0	0	1	0	2	0	1	X	4
United States (Vukich)	3	1	0	1	0	2	0	X	7

==== Draw 3 ====
Sheet B	1	2	3	4	5	6	7	8	Final
Switzerland (Nedkoff)	5	2	2	0	1	0	4	X	14
New Zealand (Becker) 🔨	0	0	0	1	0	1	0	X	2

Sheet C	1	2	3	4	5	6	7	8	Final
Sweden (Meldahl)	0	2	0	4	1	0	3	X	10
Japan (Tanaka) 🔨	1	0	3	0	0	1	0	X	5

Sheet D	1	2	3	4	5	6	7	8	Final
Scotland (Craig)	3	1	3	0	1	0	1	X	9
United States (Vukich) 🔨	0	0	0	1	0	1	0	X	2

Sheet E	1	2	3	4	5	6	7	8	Final
Italy (Macchiati)	0	0	0	0	0	1	1	X	2
Canada (Sanders) 🔨	1	2	2	2	2	0	0	X	9

==== Draw 4 ====
Sheet A	1	2	3	4	5	6	7	8	Final
Sweden (Meldahl)	0	3	0	1	0	0	2	2	8
Switzerland (Nedkoff) 🔨	1	0	1	0	1	3	0	0	6

Sheet B	1	2	3	4	5	6	7	8	Final
United States (Vukich)	0	0	1	1	1	0	2	X	5
Canada (Sanders) 🔨	2	4	0	0	0	1	0	X	7

Sheet C	1	2	3	4	5	6	7	8	Final
Scotland (Craig)	2	2	0	3	1	0	0	0	8
Italy (Macchiati) 🔨	0	0	2	0	0	1	2	0	5

Sheet D	1	2	3	4	5	6	7	8	Final
Japan (Tanaka)	0	0	2	0	3	0	0	0	5
New Zealand (Becker) 🔨	1	1	0	1	0	1	1	1	6

==== Draw 5 ====
Sheet A	1	2	3	4	5	6	7	8	Final
New Zealand (Becker)	0	0	2	0	2	1	0	X	5
Canada (Sanders) 🔨	5	1	0	3	0	0	3	X	12

Sheet B	1	2	3	4	5	6	7	8	Final
Scotland (Craig)	0	2	1	1	2	0	4	X	10
Sweden (Meldahl) 🔨	3	0	0	0	0	2	0	X	5

Sheet C	1	2	3	4	5	6	7	8	Final
Italy (Macchiati) 🔨	0	0	4	1	0	1	0	X	6
Switzerland (Nedkoff)	2	1	0	0	6	0	3	X	12

Sheet D	1	2	3	4	5	6	7	8	Final
United States (Vukich)	1	0	0	0	1	1	0	X	3
Japan (Tanaka) 🔨	0	1	2	1	0	0	4	X	8

==== Draw 6 ====
Sheet A	1	2	3	4	5	6	7	8	Final
Italy (Macchiati)	0	1	0	0	0	1	1	X	3
United States (Vukich) 🔨	2	0	1	1	3	0	0	X	7

Sheet B	1	2	3	4	5	6	7	8	Final
Japan (Tanaka) 🔨	1	0	0	0	1	0	1	X	3
Switzerland (Nedkoff)	0	3	2	1	0	1	0	X	7

Sheet D	1	2	3	4	5	6	7	8	Final
New Zealand (Becker)	1	1	0	0	0	1	0	X	3
Sweden (Meldahl) 🔨	0	0	2	2	2	0	1	X	7

Sheet E	1	2	3	4	5	6	7	8	Final
Canada (Sanders)	0	0	4	0	5	0	X	X	9
Scotland (Craig) 🔨	0	1	0	1	0	1	X	X	3

==== Draw 7 ====
Sheet B	1	2	3	4	5	6	7	8	Final
New Zealand (Becker)	0	1	0	0	1	2	0	X	4
Scotland (Craig) 🔨	2	0	1	1	0	0	2	X	6

Sheet C	1	2	3	4	5	6	7	8	Final
Canada (Sanders)	0	0	0	2	1	0	4	X	7
Sweden (Meldahl) 🔨	0	1	1	0	0	2	0	X	4

Sheet D	1	2	3	4	5	6	7	8	Final
Japan (Tanaka) 🔨	1	2	0	4	0	4	0	X	11
Italy (Macchiati)	0	0	2	0	2	0	2	X	6

Sheet E	1	2	3	4	5	6	7	8	Final
United States (Vukich)	0	0	0	0	1	0	0	X	1
Switzerland (Nedkoff) 🔨	1	1	1	1	0	5	3	X	12

=== Playoffs ===
Semi-final
1	Canada	8
4	Sweden	4
2	Switzerland	7
3	Scotland	6

Final
1	Canada	10
2	Switzerland	1
Bronze medal
4	Sweden	6
3	Scotland	2

==== Semifinals ====
Sheet B	1	2	3	4	5	6	7	8	Final
Switzerland (Nedkoff) 🔨	1	0	2	1	0	2	0	1	7
Scotland (Craig)	0	1	0	0	3	0	2	0	6

Sheet D	1	2	3	4	5	6	7	8	Final
Canada (Sanders) 🔨	2	0	2	0	2	0	2	0	8
Sweden (Meldahl)	0	1	0	2	0	1	0	0	4

==== Bronze-medal game ====
Sheet A	1	2	3	4	5	6	7	8	Final
Sweden (Meldahl)	2	1	0	1	1	0	1	X	6
Scotland (Craig) 🔨	0	0	1	0	0	1	0	X	2

==== Final ====
Sheet C	1	2	3	4	5	6	7	8	Final
Switzerland (Nedkoff) 🔨	0	0	0	0	0	1	X	X	1
Canada (Sanders)	4	1	2	2	1	0	X	X	10
