= Ingrid Meldahl =

Swedish female curler

- Curler ♀
- Other names: Ingrid Thidevall-Meldahl
- Born: 20 February 1952 (age 74)

Team
- Curling club: Stocksunds CK, Stockholm

Curling career
- Member Association: Sweden
- World Championship: 1 (1984)
- Other appearances: World Senior Championships: 11 (2004, 2005, 2006, 2007, 2008, 2009, 2010, 2011, 2012, 2013, 2014)
Medal record
Curling
Swedish Women's Championship
Gold medal – first place	1984
World Senior Championships
Gold medal – first place	2006 Copenhagen
Gold medal – first place	2007 Edmonton
Silver medal – second place	2004 Gävle
Silver medal – second place	2011 St. Paul
Bronze medal – third place	2005 Greenacres
Bronze medal – third place	2009 Dunedin
Bronze medal – third place	2010 Chelyabinsk
Bronze medal – third place	2012 Tårnby
Bronze medal – third place	2013 Fredericton

Heid Ingrid Alma Meldahl (born 20 February 1952; also known as Ingrid Thidevall-Meldahl) is a Swedish female curler.

In 1988 she was inducted into the Swedish Curling Hall of Fame.

== Teams ==
=== Women's ===
Season	Skip	Third	Second	Lead	Alternate	Coach	Events
1983–84	Ingrid Thidevall-Meldahl	Ann-Catrin Kjerr	Astrid Blomberg	Sylvia Malmberg			SWCC 1984 (gold); WCC 1984 (7th)
2003–04	Ingrid Meldahl	Ann-Catrin Kjerr	Inger Berg	Sylvia Malmberg	Birgitta Törn	Gunilla Bergman	WSCC 2004 (silver)
2004–05	Ingrid Meldahl	Ann-Catrin Kjerr	Inger Berg	Sylvia Malmberg	Birgitta Törn	Gunilla Bergman	WSCC 2005 (bronze)
2005–06	Ingrid Meldahl	Ann-Catrin Kjerr	Inger Berg	Sylvia Malmberg	Birgitta Törn	Gunilla Bergman	WSCC 2006 (gold)
2006–07	Ingrid Meldahl	Ann-Catrin Kjerr	Birgitta Törn	Inger Berg	Sylvia Liljefors	Gunilla Bergman	WSCC 2007 (gold)
2007–08	Ingrid Meldahl	Ann-Catrin Kjerr	Birgitta Törn	Sylvia Liljefors	Inger Berg	Gunilla Bergman	WSCC 2008 (6th)
2008–09	Ingrid Meldahl	Ann-Catrin Kjerr	Anta Hedström	Sylvia Liljefors	Gunilla Bergman		WSCC 2009 (bronze)
2009–10	Ingrid Meldahl	Ann-Catrin Kjerr	Anta Hedström	Sylvia Liljefors		Olof Liljefors	WSCC 2010 (bronze)
2010–11	Ingrid Meldahl	Ann-Catrin Kjerr	Anta Hedström	Sylvia Liljefors		Gunilla Bergman	WSCC 2011 (silver)
2011–12	Ingrid Meldahl	Ann-Catrin Kjerr	Anta Hedström	Sylvia Liljefors	Marie Lehander	Gunilla Bergman	WSCC 2012 (bronze)
2012–13	Ingrid Meldahl	Ann-Catrin Kjerr	Anta Hedström	Sylvia Liljefors	Marie Lehander	Jan-Erik Kjerr	WSCC 2013 (bronze)
2013–14	Ingrid Meldahl	Ann-Catrin Kjerr	Anta Hedström	Sylvia Liljefors	Marie Lehander	Gunilla Bergman	WSCC 2014 (4th)

=== Mixed doubles ===
Season	Male	Female	Events
2011–12	Mats Nyberg	Ingrid Meldahl	SMDCC 2012 (bronze)
2013–14	Karl Nordlund	Ingrid Meldahl	SMDCC 2014 (silver)
2014–15	Karl Nordlund	Ingrid Meldahl	SMDCC 2015 (5th)
2015–16	Karl Nordlund	Ingrid Meldahl	SMDCC 2016 (9th)
2016–17	Mats Nyberg	Ingrid Meldahl	SMDCC 2017 (11th)
