= 2013 World Senior Curling Championships =

- Host city: Fredericton, New Brunswick
- Arena: Grant-Harvey Centre
- Dates: April 13–20
- Men's winner: Canada
- Curling club: Red Deer Curling Centre, Red Deer
- Skip: Rob Armitage
- Third: Randy Ponich
- Second: Wilf Edgar
- Lead: Keith Glover
- Alternate: Lyle Trieber
- Finalist: New Zealand (Hans Frauenlob)
- Women's winner: Canada
- Curling club: Saville Sports Centre, Edmonton
- Skip: Cathy King
- Third: Carolyn Morris
- Second: Lesley McEwan
- Lead: Doreen Gares
- Alternate: Christine Jurgenson
- Finalist: Austria (Veronika Huber)

The 2013 World Senior Curling Championships was held at the newly constructed Grant-Harvey Centre in Fredericton, New Brunswick from April 13 to 20. The event was held in conjunction with the 2013 World Mixed Doubles Curling Championship.

== Men ==
=== Round Robin Standings ===
Final Round Robin Standings

Key
Teams to Playoffs

Pool A	Skip	W	L
New Zealand	Hans Frauenlob	8	1
Switzerland	Werner Attinger	7	2
Norway	Tormod Andreassen	5	3
Ireland	Peter Wilson	5	4
Scotland	David Hay	4	3
Japan	Masayasu Sato	4	5
Italy	Carlo Carrera	3	5
Latvia	Pēteris Šveisbergs	3	5
Czech Republic	Aleš Plešek	1	7
France	Patrick Boez	1	7

Pool B	Skip	W	L
Canada	Rob Armitage	9	0
Sweden	Karl Nordlund	8	1
Australia	Hugh Millikin	6	3
Finland	Kari Keränen	6	3
Denmark	Bent Juul Kristoffersen	5	4
United States	Gert Messing	4	5
Netherlands	Wim Neeleman	3	6
England	Michael Sutherland	3	6
Russia	Sergey Korolenko	1	8
Germany	Klaus Unterstab	0	9

=== Playoffs ===
Semifinals
A1	Canada	11
B2	Switzerland	3
B1	New Zealand	10
A2	Sweden	2

Gold-medal game
A1	Canada	6
B1	New Zealand	4
Bronze-medal game
B2	Switzerland	7
A2	Sweden	2

==== Bronze-medal game ====
Saturday, April 20, 14:00

Sheet E	1	2	3	4	5	6	7	8	Final
Switzerland (Attinger) 🔨	1	0	0	1	0	4	1	X	7
Sweden (Nordlund)	0	1	0	0	1	0	0	X	2

==== Gold-medal game ====
Saturday, April 20, 14:00

Sheet D	1	2	3	4	5	6	7	8	Final
Canada (Armitage)	0	0	2	1	0	3	0	0	6
New Zealand (Frauenlob) 🔨	0	1	0	0	1	0	1	1	4

== Women ==
=== Round Robin Standings ===
Final Round Robin Standings

Key
Teams to Playoffs
Teams to Tiebreaker

Pool A	Skip	W	L
Canada	Cathy King	6	0
Austria	Veronika Huber	4	2
Japan	Mikiko Tsuchiya	4	2
United States	Margie Smith	3	3
New Zealand	Elizabeth Matthews	3	3
Ireland	Marie O'Kane	1	5
Russia	Liudmila Murova	0	6

Pool B	Skip	W	L
Scotland	Christine Cannon	6	0
Sweden	Ingrid Meldahl	5	1
Switzerland	Erika Müller	4	2
Italy	Lucillia Macchiati	3	3
Australia	Lynn Hewitt	1	5
Czech Republic	Irena Macková	1	5
Finland	Kirsti Kauste	1	5

=== Playoffs ===
Semifinals
A1	Canada	7
B2	Sweden	6
B1	Scotland	6
A2	Austria	11

Gold-medal game
A1	Canada	13
A2	Austria	1
Bronze-medal game
B2	Sweden	9
B1	Scotland	8

==== Bronze-medal game ====
Saturday, April 20, 14:00

Sheet B	1	2	3	4	5	6	7	8	9	Final
Sweden (Meldahl)	0	2	0	2	2	0	2	0	1	9
Scotland (Cannon) 🔨	2	0	3	0	0	1	0	2	0	8

==== Gold-medal game ====
Saturday, April 20, 14:00

Sheet C	1	2	3	4	5	6	7	8	Final
Canada (King) 🔨	6	1	0	1	5	0	X	X	13
Austria (Huber)	0	0	1	0	0	0	X	X	1
