= Tony Tierney =

Irish hurler

Personal information
- Native name: Antóin Ó Tiarnaigh (Irish)
- Born: 1938 (age 87–88) Nenagh, County Tipperary, Ireland

Sport
- Sport: Hurling
- Position: Goalkeeper
Club
- Years: Club
- Nenagh Éire Óg
Club titles
- Tipperary titles: 0
Inter-county
- Years: County
- 1967: Tipperary
Inter-county titles
- Munster titles: 0
- All-Irelands: 0
- NHL: 0

Anthony Tierney (born 1938) is an Irish hurling coach, player and administrator. At club level he played with Nenagh Éire Óg and at inter-county level was a member of various Tipperary teams at all levels.

== Playing career ==
Tierney first played hurling at club level with Nenagh Éire Óg. He was part of the club's senior team that won North Tipperary SHC titles in 1957 and 1964, when he played at midfield. At inter-county level, Tierney first played for Tipperary as part of the minor team that won a fifth consecutive Munster MHC title in 1956. This win was later converted into an All-Ireland MHC medal, with Tierney lining out in goal. He also had a brief spell with the senior team in 1967.

== Coaching career ==
Tierney became involved in team management and coaching with Nenagh Éire Óg during his own playing days. He was an underage selector with the club's under-21 and minor teams in 1965 and 1966. Tierney was a player-selector with the club's senior team in 1973. He was also a member of the selection committee when Nenagh won the North Tipperary SHC title in 1992.

== Honours ==
Nenagh Éire Óg

- North Tipperary Senior Hurling Championship: 1957, 1964

Tipperary

- All-Ireland Minor Hurling Championship: 1956
- Munster Minor Hurling Championship: 1956
