= Elizabeth Matthews =

American media executive

- Education: Purdue University (BA); Emory University School of Law (JD)
- Employer: ASCAP
- Title: CEO
- Board member of: Songwriters Hall of Fame International Confederation of Societies of Authors and Composers

Elizabeth Matthews is an American media executive and attorney. She is the CEO of American Society of Composers, Authors and Publishers (ASCAP), a position she has held since 2015. She was previously executive vice president and general counsel at ASCAP and executive vice president and deputy general counsel at Viacom Media Networks.

An advocate for artist rights, Matthews has appeared on the CNBC Changemakers list and the Billboard Power 100. In 2026, Matthews was named Executive of the Year at the Billboard Women in Music awards.
