= 2011 World Senior Curling Championships =

- Host city: St. Paul, Minnesota, United States
- Arena: Saint Paul Curling Club
- Dates: April 15–24, 2011
- Men's winner: Canada
- Curling club: Thistle CC; Edmonton, Alberta
- Skip: Mark Johnson
- Third: Marvin Wirth
- Second: Ken McLean
- Lead: Millard Evans
- Alternate: Brad Hannah
- Finalist: United States (Geoff Goodland)
- Women's winner: Canada
- Curling club: Juan de Fuca CC; Victoria, British Columbia
- Skip: Christine Jurgenson
- Third: Cheryl Noble
- Second: Pat Sanders
- Lead: Roselyn Craig
- Alternate: Lena West
- Finalist: Sweden (Ingrid Meldahl)

The 2011 World Senior Curling Championships were held at the Saint Paul Curling Club in St. Paul, Minnesota, United States from April 15 to 24, 2011. The event was held in conjunction with the 2011 World Mixed Doubles Curling Championship.

Canada swept the seniors event, winning both the men's and women's championships. Canada's Mark Johnson defeated the American hosts skipped by Geoff Goodland in an extra end, stealing a point to win 5–4, while Canada's Christine Jurgenson won a six-end game 9–2 over former world senior champion Ingrid Meldahl and her Swedish rink. The Australian rink under Hugh Millikin won their second consecutive bronze medal by defeating Denmark's Bent Kristoffersen with a tally of 8–5, while the Swiss rink under Chantal Forrer took the bronze medal with a 5-4 after a single in the last end to wrap up a tight game against the American hosts under Margie Smith.

== Men ==
The men's tournament consisted of 21 teams playing in three groups of seven, an increase from last year's tournament, which consisted of 12 teams in two groups of six. The groups played a round-robin tournament within their own groups, and the top eight teams advanced to the quarterfinals and played a single-knockout round to determine the winner. The top eight teams included the top two teams from each group and two of the third-ranked teams among the groups.

=== Round-robin standings ===
Final round-robin standings

Key
Teams to Playoffs
Teams to Draw Shot Challenge (team with best moves to playoffs, other two play in qualification game)

Blue Group	Skip	W	L
United States	Geoff Goodland	6	0
England	Michael Sutherland	4	2
Scotland	Ken Horton	4	2
Hungary	András Rókusfalvy	3	3
Japan	Nobuyuki Kato	3	3
France	Christophe Lehuenen	1	5
Netherlands	Wim Neeleman	0	6

Red Group	Skip	W	L
Canada	Mark Johnson	6	0
Denmark	Bent Kristoffersen	5	1
Germany	Klaus Unterstab	4	2
Sweden	Per Carlsén	3	3
Finland	Timo Kauste	2	4
Czech Republic	Petr Slavik	1	5
Italy	Danilo Capriolo	0	6

Green Group	Skip	W	L
Switzerland	Dieter Strub	6	0
Australia	Hugh Millikin	5	1
New Zealand	Peter Becker	4	2
Ireland	Peter Wilson	3	3
Wales	Chris Wells	2	4
Russia	Sergey Melnikov	1	5
Latvia	Pēteris Šveisbergs	0	6

=== Playoffs ===
Qualification Game
R3	Germany	3
B3	Scotland	6

Quarterfinals
R1	Canada	9
B3	Scotland	3
G2	Australia	5
B2	England	4
G1	Switzerland	4
R2	Denmark	5
B1	United States	6
G3	New Zealand	2

Semifinals
R1	Canada	11
G2	Australia	1
R2	Denmark	2
B1	United States	11

Gold Medal Match
R1	Canada	5
B1	United States	4

Bronze Medal Match
G2	Australia	8
R2	Denmark	5

==== Bronze Medal Game ====
Saturday, April 23, 14:00

Sheet B	1	2	3	4	5	6	7	8	9	Final
Australia (Millikin) 🔨	0	1	0	0	2	0	2	0	3	8
Denmark (Kristoffersen)	0	0	1	1	0	1	0	2	0	5

==== Gold Medal Game ====
Saturday, April 23, 14:00

Sheet C	1	2	3	4	5	6	7	8	9	Final
Canada (Johnson)	0	0	2	0	1	0	0	1	1	5
United States (Goodland) 🔨	2	0	0	1	0	1	0	0	0	4

2011 World Senior Men's Curling Championship Winner
(Canada)
Canada
7th title

== Women ==
The women's tournament consisted of eleven teams playing a round robin tournament. The top four teams advanced to the semifinals and play a single-knockout round to determine the winner.

=== Round-robin standings ===
Final round-robin standings

Key
Teams to Playoffs

Teams	Skip	W	L
Canada	Christine Jurgenson	10	0
United States	Margie Smith	8	2
Switzerland	Chantal Forrer	7	3
Sweden	Ingrid Meldahl	7	3
Scotland	Linda Young	6	4
Czech Republic	Lenka Safranková	4	6
Japan	Eriko Igarashi	4	6
Ireland	Marie O'Kane	3	7
England	Sandra Moorcroft	2	8
New Zealand	Wendy Becker	2	8
Russia	Liudmila Murova	2	8

=== Playoffs ===
Semifinals
1	Canada	6
4	Switzerland	5
2	United States	5
3	Sweden	7

Final
1	Canada	9
3	Sweden	2

Bronze Medal Match
4	Switzerland	5
2	United States	4

==== Bronze Medal Game ====
Saturday, April 23, 14:00

Team	1	2	3	4	5	6	7	8	Final
Switzerland (Forrer)	0	0	1	0	2	1	0	1	5
United States (Smith) 🔨	1	1	0	1	0	0	1	0	4

==== Gold Medal Game ====
Saturday, April 23, 14:00

Team	1	2	3	4	5	6	7	8	Final
Canada (Jurgenson) 🔨	3	0	4	0	0	2	X	X	9
Sweden (Meldahl)	0	0	0	1	1	0	X	X	2

2011 World Women's Senior Curling Championship Winner
(Canada)
Canada
7th title
