= World Senior Curling Championships =

World championship

- Established: 2002
- 2027 host city: Kelowna, Canada
- 2027 arena: Kelowna Curling Club

Current champions (2026)
- Men: United States (Mike Farbelow)
- Women: Scotland (Jackie Lockhart)

Current edition
- 2026 World Senior Curling Championships

The World Senior Curling Championships is an annual curling tournament featuring curlers from around the world who are at least 50 years old. Matches at the World Senior Championships are played in 8 ends instead of the 10 played in most international events.

The tournament began in 2002 with only 7 men's teams and 4 women's teams but has since expanded.

The 2020 & 2021 event were cancelled on March 14, 2020, due to the COVID-19 pandemic.

== Results ==
Name of skip listed below country.

=== Men ===
Year	Location	Final			Third Place Match
Year	Location	Champion	Score	Second Place	Third Place	Score	Fourth Place
2002	(United States) Bismarck	United States; Larry Johnson	8–2	Canada; Ron Westcott	Sweden; Stig Sewik	–	Germany; Charlie Kapp
2003	(Canada) Winnipeg	Canada; Tom Reed	9–3	United States; Scott Baird	Scotland; Iain Baxter	7–5	Germany; Charlie Kapp
2004	(Sweden) Gävle	Canada; Bas Buckle	8–3	United States; Bill Kind	Switzerland; Mattias Neuenschwander	8–4	Norway; Tormod Andreassen
2005	(Scotland) Howwood	Canada; Bas Buckle	5–4	United States; David Russell	Switzerland; Peter Attinger Jr.	5–2	England; D. Michael Sutherland
2006	(Denmark) Copenhagen	Canada; Les Rogers	9–1	United States; Brian Simonson	Sweden; Jan Ullsten	12–6	Denmark; Johannes Jensen
2007	(Canada) Edmonton	Scotland; Keith Prentice	6–5	Canada; Al Hackner	Sweden; Claes Roxin	7–6	United States; Geoff Goodland
2008	(Finland) Vierumäki	Canada; Pat Ryan	8–0	Sweden; Per Lindeman	United States; David Russell	6–4	Scotland; Graeme Adam
2009	(New Zealand) Dunedin	Canada; Eugene Hritzuk	4–3	United States; Paul Pustovar	Scotland; Keith Prentice	9–3	Switzerland; André Pauli
2010	(Russia) Chelyabinsk	United States; Paul Pustovar	4–3	Canada; Bruce Delaney	Australia; Hugh Millikin	4–3	Switzerland; André Pauli
2011	(United States) St. Paul	Canada; Mark Johnson	5–4	United States; Geoff Goodland	Australia; Hugh Millikin	8–5	Denmark; Bent Juul Kristoffersen
2012	(Denmark) Tårnby	Ireland; Johnjo Kenny	6–5	Canada; Kelly Robertson	Sweden; Connie Östlund	8–4	Norway; Eigil Ramsfjell
2013	(Canada) Fredericton	Canada; Rob Armitage	6–4	New Zealand; Hans Frauenlob	Switzerland; Werner Attinger	7–2	Sweden; Karl Nordlund
2014	(Scotland) Dumfries	Canada; Wayne Tallon	7–2	Sweden; Connie Östlund	Australia; Hugh Millikin	6–3	United States; Jeff Wright
2015	(Russia) Sochi	United States; Lyle Sieg	9–4	Canada; Alan O'Leary	New Zealand; Hans Frauenlob	6–4	Denmark; Ole de Neergaard
2016	(Sweden) Karlstad	Sweden; Mats Wranå	7–4	Canada; Randy Neufeld	Ireland; Peter Wilson	7–2	Denmark; Ole de Neergaard
2017	(Canada) Lethbridge	Sweden; Mats Wranå	5–4	Canada; Bryan Cochrane	Ireland; Peter Wilson	6–3	Germany; Uwe Saile
2018	(Sweden) Östersund	Canada; Wade White	8–2	Sweden; Mats Wranå	United States; Jeff Wright	7–2	Scotland; Gordon Muirhead
2019	(Norway) Stavanger	Canada; Bryan Cochrane	7–5	Scotland; David Smith	Denmark; Ulrik Schmidt	7–4	Switzerland; Stefan Karnusian
2020	(Canada) Kelowna	Cancelled			Cancelled
2021		Cancelled			Cancelled
2022	(Switzerland) Geneva	Canada; Wade White	6–3	Czech Republic; David Šik	Sweden; Mats Wranå	7–3	Germany; Andy Kapp
2023	(South Korea) Gangneung	Canada; Howard Rajala	7–2	Scotland; Graeme Connal	Switzerland; Christof Schwaller	7–4	United States; Joel Larway
2024	(Sweden) Östersund	Canada; Paul Flemming	4–3	United States; Mike Farbelow	Sweden; Mats Wranå	11–9	Germany; Andy Kapp
2025	(Canada) Fredericton	Canada; Randy Bryden	10–7	Scotland; Tom Brewster	United States; Mike Farbelow	6–5	Finland; Tomi Rantamäki
2026	(Switzerland) Geneva	United States; Mike Farbelow	7–5	Scotland; Tom Brewster	Canada; Bruce Korte	7–4	Switzerland; Christof Schwaller
2027	(Canada) Kelowna		–			–
2028			–			–
2029	(Canada) Kelowna		–			–

=== Women ===
Year	Location	Final			Third Place Match
Year	Location	Champion	Score	Second Place	Third Place	Score	Fourth Place
2002	(United States) Bismarck	Canada; Anne Dunn	9–3	Switzerland; Erika Müller	United States; Nancy Dinsdale	–	Scotland; Christine Kerr
2003	(Canada) Winnipeg	Canada; Nancy Kerr	7–4	Scotland; Carolyn Morris	England; Joan Reed	8–1	Japan; Ayako Takagi
2004	(Sweden) Gävle	Canada; Anne Dunn	8–5	Sweden; Ingrid Meldahl	United States; Nancy Dinsdale	7–6	England; Joan Reed
2005	(Scotland) Howwood	Scotland; Carolyn Morris	9–5	Japan; Hatomi Nagaoka	Sweden; Ingrid Meldahl	7–4	Canada; Anne Dunn
2006	(Denmark) Copenhagen	Sweden; Ingrid Meldahl	7–3	Canada; Joyce Potter	Switzerland; Renate Nedkoff	9–6	Ireland; Fiona Turnbull
2007	(Canada) Edmonton	Sweden; Ingrid Meldahl	8–5	Canada; Anne Dunn	United States; Pam Oleinik	12–8	Scotland; Carolyn Morris
2008	(Finland) Vierumäki	Canada; Diane Foster	10–2	Scotland; Kirsty Letton	Switzerland; Renate Nedkoff	7–6	Finland; Helena Timonen
2009	(New Zealand) Dunedin	Canada; Pat Sanders	10–1	Switzerland; Renate Nedkoff	Sweden; Ingrid Meldahl	6–2	Scotland; Marion Craig
2010	(Russia) Chelyabinsk	Canada; Colleen Pinkney	8–4	Switzerland; Renate Nedkoff	Sweden; Ingrid Meldahl	6–5	United States; Sharon Vukich
2011	(United States) St. Paul	Canada; Christine Jurgenson	9–2	Sweden; Ingrid Meldahl	Switzerland; Chantal Forrer	5–4	United States; Margie Smith
2012	(Denmark) Tårnby	Canada; Heidi Hanlon	12–2	Scotland; Barbara Watt	Sweden; Ingrid Meldahl	10–3	New Zealand; Wendy Becker
2013	(Canada) Fredericton	Canada; Cathy King	13–1	Austria; Veronika Huber	Sweden; Ingrid Meldahl	9–8	Scotland; Christine Cannon
2014	(Scotland) Dumfries	Scotland; Christine Cannon	6–5	Canada; Colleen Pinkney	United States; Margie Smith	8–3	Sweden; Ingrid Meldahl
2015	(Russia) Sochi	Canada; Lois Fowler	6–2	Italy; Fiona Simpson	United States; Norma O'Leary	6–4	Sweden; Gunilla Arfwidsson Edlund
2016	(Sweden) Karlstad	Scotland; Jackie Lockhart	5–4	Germany; Monika Wagner	Sweden; Gunilla Arfwidsson Edlund	10–5	England; Judith Dixon
2017	(Canada) Lethbridge	Canada; Colleen Jones	10–5	Switzerland; Cristina Lestander	Scotland; Jackie Lockhart	8–5	United States; Patti Lank
2018	(Sweden) Östersund	Canada; Sherry Anderson	5–4	United States; Margie Smith	Switzerland; Dagmar Frei	5–3	Sweden; Anette Norberg
2019	(Norway) Stavanger	Canada; Sherry Anderson	10–1	Denmark; Lene Bidstrup	Switzerland; Chantal Forrer	8–3	Scotland; Susan Kesley
2020	(Canada) Kelowna	Cancelled			Cancelled
2021		Cancelled			Cancelled
2022	(Switzerland) Geneva	Switzerland; Cristina Lestander	6–5	United States; Margie Smith	Scotland; Edith Hazard	6–4	Finland; Elina Virtaala
2023	(South Korea) Gangneung	Canada; Sherry Anderson	8–4	Scotland; Jackie Lockhart	Japan; Miyuki Kawamura	6–4	Switzerland; Monika Gafner
2024	(Sweden) Östersund	Canada; Susan Froud	7–3	Lithuania; Virginija Paulauskaitė	Scotland; Karen Kennedy	6–3	Switzerland; Daniela Ruetschi-Schlegel
2025	(Canada) Fredericton	Scotland; Jackie Lockhart	10–2	Canada; Atina Ford-Johnston	Ireland; Dale Sinclair	6–4	Japan; Miyako Yoshimura
2026	(Switzerland) Geneva	Scotland; Jackie Lockhart	10–1	Germany; Sabine Belkofer-Krönhert	Canada; Sherry Middaugh	8–1	United States; Margie Smith
2027	(Canada) Kelowna		–			–
2028			–			–
2029	(Canada) Kelowna		–			–

== Medal tables ==
As of 2026 World Senior Curling Championships

Men

Rank	Nation	Gold	Silver	Bronze	Total
1	Canada	15	7	1	23
2	United States	4	7	3	14
3	Sweden	2	3	6	11
4	Scotland	1	4	2	7
5	Ireland	1	0	2	3
6	New Zealand	0	1	1	2
7	Czech Republic	0	1	0	1
8	Switzerland	0	0	4	4
9	Australia	0	0	3	3
10	Denmark	0	0	1	1
Totals (10 entries)		23	23	23	69

Women

Rank	Nation	Gold	Silver	Bronze	Total
1	Canada	15	4	1	20
2	Scotland	5	4	3	12
3	Sweden	2	2	6	10
4	Switzerland	1	4	5	10
5	United States	0	2	5	7
6	Germany	0	2	0	2
7	Japan	0	1	1	2
8	Austria	0	1	0	1
8	Denmark	0	1	0	1
8	Italy	0	1	0	1
8	Lithuania	0	1	0	1
12	England	0	0	1	1
12	Ireland	0	0	1	1
Totals (13 entries)		23	23	23	69

Overall

Rank	Nation	Gold	Silver	Bronze	Total
1	Canada	30	11	2	43
2	Scotland	6	8	5	19
3	United States	4	9	8	21
4	Sweden	4	5	12	21
5	Switzerland	1	4	9	14
6	Ireland	1	0	3	4
7	Germany	0	2	0	2
8	Denmark	0	1	1	2
8	Japan	0	1	1	2
8	New Zealand	0	1	1	2
11	Austria	0	1	0	1
11	Czech Republic	0	1	0	1
11	Italy	0	1	0	1
11	Lithuania	0	1	0	1
15	Australia	0	0	3	3
16	England	0	0	1	1
Totals (16 entries)		46	46	46	138
