= English Men's Curling Championship =

Curling competition in England

- Established: 1975
- 2024 host city: Dumfries, Scotland
- 2024 arena: Dumfries Ice Bowl
- 2024 champion: Rob Retchless

The English Men's Curling Championship is the national men's curling championship for England. The championship decides which team of curlers is sent to the European Curling Championships (and the same year's World Curling Championships, if England qualifies) the following season. It has been held annually since 1975. It is organized by the English Curling Association.

== Past champions ==
Year	Skip	Vice	Second	Lead	Alternate	Place at Euros next season	Place at Worlds that season
1975	Ron Thornton	Ken Duncan	John D Kerr	Barry Nevett		-	
1976	Ron Thornton	John D Kerr	Tony Atherton	Tony Fraser		9th	
1977	not held					9th	
1978	Ron Thornton	John D Kerr	Peter Kershaw	Michael Thompson		9th	
1979	Tony Atherton	Frank Kershaw	Tony Fraser	Ian Kerr		10th	
1980	Alan Forrest	Malcolm Maxwell	Stephen Shell	Geoff Logan		12th	
1981	Tony Atherton	Ron Thornton	John D Kerr	Michael Thompson		9th	
1982	Bob Martin	Ronnie Brock	John Brown	Duncan Stewart		11th	
1983	Ronnie Brock	John Brown	Ian Coutts	Duncan Stewart		13th	
1984	Bob Martin	Ronnie Brock	Ian Coutts	Duncan Stewart		5th	
1985	Bob Martin	Ronnie Brock	Ian Coutts	John Brown		7th	10th
1986	Bob Martin	Ronnie Brock	Robin Gemmell	John Brown		10th	
1987	John Deakin	Peter Bowyer	Martyn Deakin	Gordon Vickers		11th	10th
1988	John Deakin	Peter Bowyer	Gordon Vickers	Malcolm Richardson		10th	
1989	Eric Laidler	Michael Sutherland	Jim Wilson	Neil Harvey		12th	
1990	Alistair Burns	John Deakin	Martyn Deakin	Stephen Watt		4th	
1991	Alistair Burns	John Deakin	Neil Hardie	Stephen Watt		9th	
1992	Alistair Burns	Phil Atherton	Neil Hardie	Stephen Watt		7th	8th
1993	Alistair Burns	Phil Atherton	Neil Hardie	Stephen Watt		10th	
1994	Alistair Burns	Andrew Hemming	Neil Hardie	Stephen Watt	Phil Atherton	6th	
1995	Alistair Burns	Andrew Hemming	Neil Hardie	Stephen Watt	Phil Atherton	6th	9th
1996	Martyn Deakin	Alan Turner	Harvey Curle	Ian Coutts		8th	6th
1997	Martyn Deakin	Alan Turner	Stephen Hinds	Ian Coutts	Harvey Curle	10th	
1998	Martyn Deakin	Alan Turner	Phil Atherton	Stephen Hinds	Harvey Curle	10th	
1999	Mark Copperwheat	Bruce Bowyer	Stephen Hinds	Richard Hills		13th	
2000	James Dixon	Harvey Curle	Andrew Dixon	Richard Murray		13th	
2001	Andrew Reed	Tom Jaeggi	Chris Smith	Daniel Jaeggi		12th	
2002	James Dixon	Harvey Curle	Andrew Dixon	Richard Murray		8th	
2003	James Dixon	Harvey Curle	Martyn Deakin	Richard Murray		10th	
2004	Andrew Reed	Harvey Curle	Chris Smith	Richard Murray		13th	
2005	Bruce Bowyer	Stephen Hinds	Richard Hills	Mark Wilkinson		14th	
2006	Michael Opel	Jamie Malton	Andrew Woolston	Kenneth Malton		15th	
2007	Andrew Reed	James Dixon	Andrew Dixon	Neil Murray		15th	
2008	Andrew Reed	James Dixon	Tom Jaeggi	Andrew Dixon		19th	
2009	Jamie Malton	Michael Opel	Henry Carter	Keith Wilson		16th	
2010	Alan MacDougall	Andrew Reed	Andrew Woolston	Tom Jaeggi		21st	
2011	Alan MacDougall	Andrew Reed	Andrew Woolston	Tom Jaeggi		13th	
2012	Alan MacDougall	Andrew Reed	Andrew Woolston	Tom Jaeggi		14th	
2013	Alan MacDougall	Andrew Reed	Andrew Woolston	Tom Jaeggi		18th	
2014	Alan MacDougall	Andrew Reed	Andrew Woolston	Tom Jaeggi		13th	
2015	Alan MacDougall	Andrew Reed	Andrew Woolston	Tom Jaeggi	Ben Fowler	17th	
2016	Alan MacDougall	Andrew Reed	Andrew Woolston	Tom Jaeggi	Ben Fowler	19th	
2017	Andrew Woolston	Ben Fowler	Scott Gibson	Fraser Clark	James Whittle	19th	
2018	Andrew Reed	Michael Opel	Jamie Malton	Tom Jaeggi		12th	
2019	Andrew Reed	Michael Opel	Jamie Malton	Tom Jaeggi		10th	
2020	Andrew Woolston	Andrew Reed	Scott Gibson	Fraser Clark	Ben Fowler	17th	
2021	Cancelled						
2022	Andrew Woolston	Andrew Reed	Scott Gibson	Jim Whittle	Tom Jaeggi	18th	
2023	Rob Retchless	Jonathan Havercroft	Jotham Sugden	Harry Pinnell		11th	
2024	Rob Retchless	Joe Sugden	Scott Gibson	Jonathan Havercroft			
2025	Andrew Reed	James Whittle	Callum McLain	Colin Mouat (V)			
2026							

== See also ==
- English Women's Curling Championship
- English Mixed Doubles Curling Championship
- English Mixed Curling Championship
