= Franziska Jöhr =

Swiss curler

- Curler ♀

Team
- Curling club: CC Bern, Bern

Curling career
- Member Association: Switzerland
- World Championship: 1 (1985)
Medal record
Curling
World Championships
Bronze medal – third place	1985 Jönköping
Swiss Women's Championship
Gold medal – first place	1985

Franziska Jöhr is a former Swiss curler.

She is a 1985 World women's bronze medalist.

== Teams ==
Season	Skip	Third	Second	Lead	Events
1984–85	Erika Müller	Barbara Meyer	Barbara Meier	Franziska Jöhr	SWCC 1985 (gold); WCC 1985 (bronze)
