= Cristina Lestander =

Swiss curler

- Curler ♀
- Other names: Cristina Wirz
- Born: 27 June 1962 (age 64)

Team
- Curling club: Bern Egghölzi Damen CC, Bern, Zug CC, Zug

Curling career
- Member Association: Switzerland
- World Championship: 5 (1982, 1983, 1986, 1989, 1998)
- European Championship: 5 (1983, 1987, 1988, 1990, 1995)
- Olympic: 1 (1988 – demo)
- Other appearances: World Senior Championships: (2013, 2017), 2022
Medal record
Curling
World Championships
Gold medal – first place	1983 Moose Jaw
European Championships
Bronze medal – third place	1983 Västerås
Bronze medal – third place	1988 Perth
Bronze medal – third place	1990 Lillehammer
Swiss Women's Championship
Gold medal – first place	1982
Gold medal – first place	1983
Gold medal – first place	1986
Gold medal – first place	1989
Gold medal – first place	1998
World Senior Championships
Gold medal – first place	2022 Geneva
Silver medal – second place	2017 Lethbridge

Cristina Lestander (born 27 June 1962 as Cristina Wirz) is a former Swiss curler.

She is a 1983 World women's champion.

She competed at the 1988 Winter Olympics when curling was a demonstration sport.

She works for Swiss Curling Association.

== Awards ==
- Frances Brodie Award: 1989.

== Teams ==
=== Women's ===
Season	Skip	Third	Second	Lead	Alternate	Coach	Events
1981–82	Erika Müller	Barbara Meyer	Nicole Oetliker	Cristina Wirz			SWCC 1982 (gold); WCC 1982 (7th)
1982–83	Erika Müller	Barbara Meyer	Barbara Meier	Cristina Wirz			SWCC 1983 (gold); WCC 1983 (gold)
1983–84	Erika Müller	Barbara Meyer	Barbara Meier	Cristina Wirz			ECC 1983 (bronze)
1985–86	Erika Müller	Irene Bürgi	Barbara Meier	Cristina Lestander			SWCC 1986 (gold); WCC 1986 (6th)
1987–88	Cristina Lestander	Barbara Meier	Christina Gartenmann	Katrin Peterhans			ECC 1987 (5th); OG 1988 (demo) (7th)
1988–89	Cristina Lestander	Barbara Meier	Ingrid Thulin	Katrin Peterhans			ECC 1988 (bronze); SWCC 1989 (gold); WCC 1989 (5th)
1990–91	Cristina Lestander	Christine Krieg	Nicole Oetliker	Christina Gartenmann			ECC 1990 (bronze)
1995–96	Cristina Lestander	Claudia Bärtschi	Andrea Stöckli	Katrin Peterhans	Jutta Tanner	Heinz Schmid, Erika Müller	ECC 1995 (7th)
1997–98	Cristina Lestander	Selina Breuleux	Madlaina Breuleux	Annick Lusser	Sandra Arnold	Heinz Sommerhalder	SWCC 1998 (gold); WCC 1998 (6th)
2012–13	Erika Müller	Barbara Gurini	Cristina Lestander	Anna Müller	Barbara Sieber	Michael Müller	WSCC 2013 (5th)
2016–17	Martina Baumann	Cristina Lestander	Tanja Santschi	Mara Grassi	Rahel Haesler		
2016–17	Cristina Lestander	Anne Marie Müller	Monika Gafner	Daniela Gygax	Irene Beck	Daniel Zimmermann	WSCC 2017 (silver)
2018–19	Martina Baumann	Cristina Lestander	Tanja Santschi	Mara Grassi	Rahel Haesler		

=== Mixed ===
Season	Skip	Third	Second	Lead	Events
1984	Beat Stephan	Cristina Wirz	Simon Roth	Irène Bretscher	SMxCC 1984 (gold)

=== Mixed doubles ===
Season	Male	Female
2016–17	Konrad Schneider	Cristina Lestander
