= Kirsty Hay =

Scottish curler (born 1972)

- Curler ♀
- Born: Kirsty Addison; 9 February 1972 (age 54); Glasgow, Scotland

Team
- Curling club: Airleywight Ladies CC, Perth

Curling career
- Member Association: Scotland; United Kingdom
- World Championship: 3 (1995, 1996, 1998)
- European Championship: 5 (1989, 1992, 1994, 1995, 1997)
- Olympic: 1 (1998)
- Other appearances: World Junior Championships: 2 (1990, 1993)
Medal record
Curling
European Championships
Silver medal – second place	1992 Perth
Silver medal – second place	1995 Grindelwald
Scottish Women's Championship
Gold medal – first place	1995
Gold medal – first place	1996
Gold medal – first place	1998
World Junior Championships
Gold medal – first place	1990 Portage la Prairie
Gold medal – first place	1993 Grindelwald

Kirsty Hay (born 9 February 1972 in Glasgow, Scotland as Kirsty Addison) is a Scottish curler, a two-time European silver medallist (1992, 1995) and a three-time Scottish women's champion (1995, 1996, 1998).

She played for Great Britain at the 1998 Winter Olympics, where the British team finished in fourth place.

At 17, she won her first national junior title and went on to skip her team to gold at the 1990 World Junior Championships. This was the first occasion that a Scottish women's team had ever held a world title in curling.

== Awards ==
- Frances Brodie Award: 1996
- World Junior Curling Championships All-Star Team, Women: 1993

== Teams ==
Season	Skip	Third	Second	Lead	Alternate	Coach	Events
1989–90	Kirsty Addison	Karen Addison	Joanna Pegg	Laura Scott			ECC 1989 (6th); SJCC 1990 (gold); WJCC 1990 (gold)
1992–93	Kirsty Hay	Hazel Erskine	Joanna Pegg	Louise Wilkie			ECC 1992 (silver)
1992–93	Kirsty Hay	Gillian Barr	Joanna Pegg	Louise Wilkie	Fiona Brown		SJCC 1993 (gold); WJCC 1993 (gold)
1994–95	Kirsty Hay	Edith Loudon	Joanna Pegg	Katie Loudon	Jackie Lockhart (ECC), Claire Milne (WCC)	Peter Loudon	ECC 1994 (6th); SWCC 1995 (gold); WCC 1995 (7th)
1995–96	Kirsty Hay	Edith Loudon	Karen Addison	Katie Loudon	Claire Milne	Peter Loudon	ECC 1995 (silver); SWCC 1996 (gold); WCC 1996 (5th)
1997–98	Kirsty Hay	Edith Loudon	Jackie Lockhart	Katie Loudon	Fiona Bayne	Jane Sanderson	ECC 1997 (6th); SWCC 1998 (gold); WOG 1998 (4th); WCC 1998 (7th)

== Personal life ==
Her sister Karen Addison is also a curler. They won the 1990 World Junior Championship together.

She began curling at the age of 12.
