= Barbara Meyer (curler) =

Swiss curler

- Curler ♀

Team
- Curling club: Bern Egghölzi Damen CC, Bern, Bern CC, Bern

Curling career
- Member Association: Switzerland
- World Championship: 3 (1982, 1983, 1985)
- European Championship: 1 (1983)
Medal record
Curling
World Championships
| Gold medal – first place | 1983 Moose Jaw |
| Bronze medal – third place | 1985 Jönköping |
European Championships
| Bronze medal – third place | 1983 Västerås |
Swiss Women's Championship
| Gold medal – first place | 1982 |
| Gold medal – first place | 1983 |
| Gold medal – first place | 1985 |

Barbara Meyer is a former Swiss curler.

She is a 1983 World women's champion and a 1985 World women's bronze medallist.

== Teams ==
=== Women's ===
| Season | Skip | Third | Second | Lead | Events |
|---|---|---|---|---|---|
| 1981–82 | Erika Müller | Barbara Meyer | Nicole Oetliker | Cristina Wirz | SWCC 1982 (gold); WCC 1982 (7th) |
| 1982–83 | Erika Müller | Barbara Meyer | Barbara Meier | Cristina Wirz | SWCC 1983 (gold); WCC 1983 (gold) |
| 1983–84 | Erika Müller | Barbara Meyer | Barbara Meier | Cristina Wirz | ECC 1983 (bronze) |
| 1984–85 | Erika Müller | Barbara Meyer | Barbara Meier | Franziska Jöhr | SWCC 1985 (gold); WCC 1985 (bronze) |

=== Mixed ===
| Season | Skip | Third | Second | Lead | Events |
|---|---|---|---|---|---|
| 1981 | Erika Müller | Urs Winkelhausen | Barbara Meyer | Jürg Winkelhausen | SMxCC 1981 (gold) |
