= Fiona Bayne =

Scottish curler

- Curler ♀
- Other names: Felsie
- Born: 10 May 1966 (age 60); Perth, Scotland

Team
- Curling club: Airleywight Ladies CC, Perth

Curling career
- Member Association: Scotland; United Kingdom
- World Championship: 1 (1998)
- European Championship: 5 (1988, 1990, 1991, 1996, 1997)
- Olympic: 1 (1998)
Medal record
Curling
European Championships
Silver medal – second place	1988 Perth
Silver medal – second place	1990 Lillehammer
Scottish Women's Championship
Gold medal – first place	1998

Fiona "Felsie" Bayne (born 10 May 1966 in Perth) is a Scottish curler, a two-time European silver medallist (1988, 1990) and a 1998 Scottish women's champion.

She played for Great Britain at the 1998 Winter Olympics, where the British team finished in fourth place.

== Teams ==
Season	Skip	Third	Second	Lead	Alternate	Coach	Events
1988–89	Hazel McGregor	Edith Loudon	Fiona Bayne	Katie Loudon			ECC 1988 (silver)
1990–91	Hazel Erskine	Edith Loudon	Katie Loudon	Fiona Bayne			ECC 1990 (silver)
1991–92	Hazel Erskine	Edith Loudon	Katie Loudon	Fiona Bayne			ECC 1991 (5th)
1996–97	Rhona Martin	Gail McMillan	Fiona Bayne	Linda McAulay	Jackie Lockhart	Russell Keiller	ECC 1996 (4th)
1997–98	Kirsty Hay	Edith Loudon	Jackie Lockhart	Katie Loudon	Fiona Bayne	Jane Sanderson	ECC 1997 (6th); SWCC 1998 (gold); WOG 1998 (4th); WCC 1998 (7th)
