= Barbara Meier (curler) =

Swiss curler

- Curler ♀

Team
- Curling club: CC Bern & Bern Egghölzi Damen CC, Bern

Curling career
- Member Association: Switzerland
- World Championship: 4 (1983, 1985, 1986, 1989)
- European Championship: 3 (1983, 1987, 1988)
- Olympic: 1 (1988)
Medal record
Curling
World Championships
Gold medal – first place	1983 Moose Jaw
Bronze medal – third place	1985 Jönköping
European Championships
Bronze medal – third place	1983 Västerås
Bronze medal – third place	1988 Perth
Swiss Women's Championship
Gold medal – first place	1983
Gold medal – first place	1985
Gold medal – first place	1986
Gold medal – first place	1989

Barbara Meier is a former Swiss curler.

She is a 1983 World women's champion and a 1985 World women's bronze medallist.

She competed at the 1988 Winter Olympics when curling was a demonstration sport.

== Teams ==
Season	Skip	Third	Second	Lead	Events
1982–83	Erika Müller	Barbara Meyer	Barbara Meier	Cristina Wirz	SWCC 1983 (gold); WCC 1983 (gold)
1983–84	Erika Müller	Barbara Meyer	Barbara Meier	Cristina Wirz	ECC 1983 (bronze)
1984–85	Erika Müller	Barbara Meyer	Barbara Meier	Franziska Jöhr	SWCC 1985 (gold); WCC 1985 (bronze)
1985–86	Erika Müller	Irene Bürgi	Barbara Meier	Cristina Lestander	SWCC 1986 (gold); WCC 1986 (6th)
1987–88	Cristina Lestander	Barbara Meier	Christina Gartenmann	Katrin Peterhans	ECC 1987 (5th); OG 1988 (demo) (7th)
1988–89	Cristina Lestander	Barbara Meier	Ingrid Thulin	Katrin Peterhans	ECC 1988 (bronze); SWCC 1989 (gold); WCC 1989 (5th)
