= 1983 Pioneer Life World Women's Curling Championship =

- Host city: Moose Jaw, Saskatchewan, Canada
- Arena: Moose Jaw Civic Centre
- Dates: April 4–9
- Winner: Switzerland
- Curling club: Bern Egghölzi Damen CC, Bern
- Skip: Erika Müller
- Third: Barbara Meyer
- Second: Barbara Meier
- Lead: Cristina Wirz
- Finalist: Norway (Eva Vanvik)

The 1983 Pioneer Life World Women's Curling Championship, the women's world curling championship, was held from April 3–9 at the Moose Jaw Civic Centre in Moose Jaw, Saskatchewan, Canada.

== Teams ==
Austria	Canada	Denmark	France	Italy
Kitzbühl CC, Kitzbühl Skip: Marianne Gartner; Third: Edeltraud Koudelka; Second: Monika Hölzl; Lead: Herta Kuchenmeister	Halifax CC, Nova Scotia Skip: Penny LaRocque; Third: Sharon Horne; Second: Cathy Caudle; Lead: Pam Sanford	Hvidovre CC, Hvidovre Skip: Jane Bidstrup; Third: Iben Larsen; Second: Maj-Brit Rejnholdt-Christiensen; Lead: Kirsten Hur	Mont d'Arbois CC, Megève Fourth: Huguette Jullien; Third: Agnes Mercier; Skip: Paulette Sulpice; Lead: Monique Tournier	Cortina CC, Cortina d'Ampezzo Skip: Maria-Grazzia Constantini; Third: Ann Lacedelli; Second: Nella Alvera; Lead: Angela Constantini
Norway	Scotland	Sweden	Switzerland	United States
Trondheim CC, Trondheim Skip: Eva Vanvik; Third: Åse Vanvik; Second: Alvhild Fugelmo; Lead: Liv Grøseth	Airleywight Ladies CC, Perth Skip: Hazel McGregor; Third: Jane Ramsey; Second: Betty McGregor; Lead: Billie-May Muirhead	Falu CC, Falun Skip: Anneli Burman; Third: Brita Lindholm; Second: Mait Bjurström; Lead: Katarina Lässker	Bern Egghölzi Damen CC, Bern Skip: Erika Müller; Third: Barbara Meyer; Second: Barbara Meier; Lead: Cristina Wirz	Granidears CC, Seattle, Washington Skip: Nancy Langley; Third: Dolores Campbell; Second: Nancy Wallace; Lead: Leslie Frosch

== Round-robin standings ==
Key
Teams to playoffs
Teams to tiebreaker

Country	Skip	W	L
Switzerland	Erika Müller	8	1
Canada	Penny LaRocque	7	2
Norway	Eva Vanvik	6	3
France	Paulette Sulpice	5	4
Sweden	Anneli Burman	5	4
Scotland	Hazel McGregor	4	5
Denmark	Jane Bidstrup	4	5
United States	Nancy Langley	4	5
Italy	Maria-Grazzia Constantini	2	7
Austria	Marianne Gartner	0	9

== Round-robin results ==
=== Draw 1 ===
Team	Final
Italy (Constantini)	4
France (Sulpice)	8

Team	Final
Sweden (Burman)	11
Austria (Gartner)	1

Team	Final
Canada (La Rocque)	10
Norway (Vanvik)	8

Team	Final
Scotland (McGregor)	9
Denmark (Bidstrup)	2

Team	Final
United States (Langley)	9
Switzerland (Müller)	17

=== Draw 2 ===
Team	Final
United States (Langley)	6
Sweden (Burman)	4

Team	Final
Norway (Vanvik)	3
Switzerland (Müller)	12

Team	Final
Italy (Constantini)	2
Scotland (McGregor)	8

Team	Final
Canada (La Rocque)	10
France (Sulpice)	1

Team	Final
Austria (Gartner)	7
Denmark (Bidstrup)	10

=== Draw 3 ===
Team	Final
Denmark (Bidstrup)	5
Switzerland (Müller)	8

Team	Final
France (Sulpice)	8
Scotland (McGregor)	6

Team	Final
Austria (Gartner)	1
United States (Langley)	14

Team	Final
Norway (Vanvik)	9
Italy (Constantini)	5

Team	Final
Canada (La Rocque)	11
Sweden (Burman)	6

=== Draw 4 ===
Team	Final
France (Sulpice)	9
Austria (Gartner)	7

Team	Final
Canada (La Rocque)	9
Italy (Constantini)	1

Team	Final
Sweden (Burman)	8
Switzerland (Müller)	4

Team	Final
Denmark (Bidstrup)	10
United States (Langley)	4

Team	Final
Scotland (McGregor)	8
Norway (Vanvik)	9

=== Draw 5 ===
Team	Final
Canada (La Rocque)	8
United States (Langley)	5

Team	Final
Austria (Gartner)	5
Norway (Vanvik)	13

Team	Final
France (Sulpice)	10
Denmark (Bidstrup)	5

Team	Final
Sweden (Burman)	8
Scotland (McGregor)	5

Team	Final
Switzerland (Müller)	10
Italy (Constantini)	6

=== Draw 6 ===
Team	Final
Switzerland (Müller)	7
Scotland (McGregor)	6

Team	Final
Italy (Constantini)	5
Denmark (Bidstrup)	10

Team	Final
Norway (Vanvik)	7
Sweden (Burman)	6

Team	Final
Austria (Gartner)	1
Canada (La Rocque)	9

Team	Final
France (Sulpice)	7
United States (Langley)	8

=== Draw 7 ===
Team	Final
Sweden (Burman)	10
Italy (Constantini)	1

Team	Final
Switzerland (Müller)	11
France (Sulpice)	3

Team	Final
Scotland (McGregor)	9
Austria (Gartner)	4

Team	Final
United States (Langley)	7
Norway (Vanvik)	6

Team	Final
Denmark (Bidstrup)	9
Canada (La Rocque)	5

=== Draw 8 ===
Team	Final
Norway (Vanvik)	9
Denmark (Bidstrup)	7

Team	Final
Scotland (McGregor)	9
United States (Langley)	5

Team	Final
Switzerland (Müller)	5
Canada (La Rocque)	3

Team	Final
France (Sulpice)	7
Sweden (Burman)	5

Team	Final
Italy (Constantini)	8
Austria (Gartner)	4

=== Draw 9 ===
Team	Final
Canada (La Rocque)	5
Scotland (McGregor)	4

Team	Final
Sweden (Burman)	9
Denmark (Bidstrup)	3

Team	Final
Italy (Constantini)	9
United States (Langley)	5

Team	Final
Switzerland (Müller)	12
Austria (Gartner)	5

Team	Final
Norway (Vanvik)	8
Austria (Gartner)	5

== Tiebreaker ==
Team	Final
Sweden (Burman)	11
France (Sulpice)	4

== Playoffs ==
Semifinals
1	Switzerland	12
4	Sweden	10
2	Canada	3
3	Norway	6

Final
1	Switzerland	18
3	Norway	3

=== Semifinals ===
Team	Final
Switzerland (Müller)	12
Sweden (Burman)	10

Team	Final
Canada (La Rocque)	3
Norway (Vanvik)	6

=== Final ===
Team	Final
Switzerland (Müller)	18
Norway (Vanvik)	3

1983 Pioneer Life World Women's Curling Championship
(Switzerland)
Switzerland
2nd title
