= Andreas Feldenkirchen =

German curler

- Curler ♂

Team
- Curling club: CC Hamburg

Curling career
- Member Association: Germany
- World Championship: 1 (1996)
- European Championship: 1 (1990)
- Other appearances: World Junior Championships: 1 (1988)

Andreas Feldenkirchen (born c. 1969) is a German curler.

At the time of the 1996 Worlds, he was a store manager.

== Teams ==
| Season | Skip | Third | Second | Lead | Alternate | Events |
|---|---|---|---|---|---|---|
| 1987–88 | Bernhard Mayr | Mark Sarty | Ralph Schwarzwalder | Andreas Feldenkirchen | | WJCC 1988 (8th) |
| 1990–91 | Rodger Gustaf Schmidt | Philip Seitz | Johnny Jahr | Andreas Feldenkirchen | Dirk Hornung, Joackim Fendske | ECC 1990 (10th) |
| 1995–96 | Johnny Jahr | Sven Goldemann | Andreas Feldenkirchen | Till Thomsen | Dirk Hornung | WCC 1996 (9th) |
| 2006–07 | Christopher Bartsch | Felix Schulze | Andreas Feldenkirchen | Sven Goldemann | | |
