= Katie Loudon =

Scottish curler

- Curler ♀
- Born: 6 July 1968 (age 58); Perth, Scotland

Team
- Curling club: Airleywight Ladies CC, Perth
- Skip: Jackie Lockhart
- Third: Mairi Milne
- Second: Wendy Johnston
- Lead: Katie Loudon
- Alternate: Edith Hazard

Curling career
- Member Association: Scotland
- World Championship: 4 (1995, 1996, 1998, 2003)
- European Championship: 7 (1988, 1990, 1991, 1994, 1995, 1997, 2003)
- Olympic: 1 (1998)
- Other appearances: World Junior Championships: 1 (1989)
Medal record
Curling
Representing Scotland
World Senior Championships
Gold medal – first place	2025 Fredericton
Gold medal – first place	2026 Geneva
Silver medal – second place	2023 Gangneung
Bronze medal – third place	2022 Geneva
European Championships
Silver medal – second place	1988 Perth
Silver medal – second place	1990 Lillehammer
Silver medal – second place	1995 Grindelwald
Scottish Women's Championship
Gold medal – first place	1995
Gold medal – first place	1996
Gold medal – first place	1998
Gold medal – first place	2003
World Junior Championships
Bronze medal – third place	1989 Markham

Katie Loudon (born 6 July 1968 in Perth, Scotland) is a Scottish curler.

She played for Great Britain at the 1998 Winter Olympics.

== Teams ==
=== Women's ===
Season	Skip	Third	Second	Lead	Alternate	Coach	Events
1988–89	Hazel McGregor	Edith Loudon	Fiona Bayne	Katie Loudon			ECC 1988 (silver)
1988–89	Carolyn Hutchison	Julie Hepburn	Katie Loudon	Julia Halliday			SJCC 1989 (gold); WJCC 1989 (bronze)
1990–91	Hazel Erskine	Edith Loudon	Katie Loudon	Fiona Bayne			ECC 1990 (silver)
1991–92	Hazel Erskine	Edith Loudon	Katie Loudon	Fiona Bayne			ECC 1991 (5th)
1994–95	Kirsty Hay	Edith Loudon	Joanna Pegg	Katie Loudon	Jackie Lockhart (ECC), Claire Milne (WCC)	Peter Loudon	ECC 1994 (6th); SWCC 1995 (gold); WCC 1995 (7th)
1995–96	Kirsty Hay	Edith Loudon	Karen Addison	Katie Loudon	Claire Milne	Peter Loudon	ECC 1995 (silver); SWCC 1996 (gold); WCC 1996 (5th)
1997–98	Kirsty Hay	Edith Loudon	Jackie Lockhart	Katie Loudon	Fiona Bayne	Jane Sanderson	ECC 1997 (6th); SWCC 1998 (gold); WOG 1998 (4th); WCC 1998 (7th)
2002–03	Edith Loudon	Karen Addison	Lynn Cameron	Katie Loudon	Jackie Lockhart (WCC)	Keith Prentice	SWCC 2003 (gold); WCC 2003 (7th)
2003–04	Edith Loudon	Karen Addison	Lynn Cameron	Katie Loudon	Jackie Lockhart	Isobel Hannen	ECC 2003 (4th)
2005–06	Edith Loudon	Mairi Milne	Sheila Swan	Katie Loudon			SWCC 2006 (4th)

=== Mixed ===
Season	Skip	Third	Second	Lead	Events
1993	Peter Loudon	Edith Loudon	Alec Torrance Jr.	Katie Loudon	SMxCC 1993 (gold)
1995	Peter Loudon	Edith Loudon	Russell Keiller	Katie Loudon	SMxCC 1995 (silver)

== Private life ==
Loudon is from a family of curlers: her brother Peter is a World and European champion, her sister Edith was Katie's teammate, playing together at the 1998 Winter Olympics.
