= 1985 World Women's Curling Championship =

- Host city: Jönköping, Sweden
- Arena: Rosenlundshallen
- Dates: March 17–23, 1985
- Winner: Canada
- Curling club: North Shore Winter Club; Vancouver, British Columbia
- Skip: Linda Moore
- Third: Lindsay Sparkes
- Second: Debbie Jones
- Lead: Laurie Carney
- Finalist: Scotland (Isobel Torrance Jr.)

The 1985 World Women's Curling Championship (branded as 1985 H&M World Women's Curling Championship for sponsorship reasons) was held from March 17–23 at the Rosenlundshallen in Jönköping, Sweden.

Canada's Linda Moore rink defeated Scotland's Isobel Torrance team in the final, 5–2. Both teams played cautiously, but Scotland, who were the youngest team at the event, made more mistakes. Canada took a significant lead in the sixth end, when they stole a point to lead 3–1 after Torrance tried a hit and stick, but rolled out of the house. Canada stole another point in the ninth to lead 5–2 after Torrance was light on a draw attempt. In the final end, Moore ran Scotland out of stones after making a take out of a rock in the 12-foot. Prior to Moore's shot, Scotland were sitting two, but needed three to tie. It was Canada's second straight championship, the first country to win two straight titles. Switzerland's Erika Müller won the bronze medal, defeating Sweden, skipped by Inga Arfwidsson in the bronze medal game, 6–4.

== Teams ==
Canada	Denmark	France	West Germany	Italy
North Shore Winter Club, North Vancouver Skip: Linda Moore; Third: Lindsay Sparkes; Second: Debbie Jones; Lead: Laurie Carney	Hvidovre CC, Hvidovre Skip: Helena Blach; Third: Jette Olsen; Second: Malene Krause; Lead: Lone Kristoffersen	Mont d'Arbois CC, Megève Fourth: Huguette Jullien; Skip: Paulette Sulpice; Second: Andrée Dupont-Roc; Lead: Jocelyn Lhenry	SC Riessersee, Garmish-Partenkirchen Skip: Andrea Schöpp; Third: Monika Wagner; Second: Christiane Jentsch; Lead: Elinore Schöpp	Cortina CC, Cortina d'Ampezzo Skip: Maria-Grazzia Constantini; Third: Tea Valt; Second: Nella Alvera; Lead: Angela Constantini
Norway	Scotland	Sweden	Switzerland	United States
Trondheim CC, Trondheim Skip: Eva Vanvik; Third: Åse Vanvik; Second: Alvhild Fugelmo; Lead: Else Skogan	Hamilton & Thornyhill CC, Hamilton Skip: Isobel Torrance Jr. Third: Margaret Craig; Second: Jackie Steele; Lead: Sheila Harvey Alternate: Isobel Torrance	Norrköpings CK, Norrköping Fourth: Maud Nordlander; Skip: Inga Arfwidsson; Second: Ulrika Åkerberg; Lead: Barbro Arfwidsson	Bern CC, Bern Skip: Erika Müller; Third: Barbara Meyer; Second: Barbara Meier; Lead: Franziska Jöhr	Fairbanks CC, Fairbanks Skip: Bev Birklid; Third: Peggy Martin; Second: Jerry Evans; Lead: Katrina Sharp

== Round robin standings ==
Key
Teams to playoffs
Teams to tiebreaker

Country	Skip	W	L
Switzerland	Erika Müller	8	1
Canada	Linda Moore	7	2
Sweden	Inga Arfwidsson	6	3
Scotland	Isobel Torrance Jr.	5	4
West Germany	Andrea Schöpp	5	4
Denmark	Helena Blach	4	5
Norway	Eva Vanvik	4	5
France	Paulette Sulpice	3	6
United States	Bev Birklid	2	7
Italy	Maria-Grazzia Constantini	1	8

== Round robin results ==
=== Draw 1 ===
Team	Final
United States (Birklid)	3
Canada (Moore)	13

Team	Final
Norway (Vanvik)	4
Switzerland (Müller)	9

Team	Final
Denmark (Blach)	4
Scotland (Torrance)	3

Team	Final
Sweden (Arfwidsson)	8
West Germany (Schöpp)	5

Team	Final
France (Sulpice)	8
Italy (Constantini)	5

=== Draw 2 ===
Team	Final
France (Sulpice)	9
Norway (Vanvik)	6

Team	Final
Scotland (Torrance)	8
Italy (Constantini)	5

Team	Final
United States (Birklid)	7
Sweden (Arfwidsson)	11

Team	Final
Denmark (Blach)	6
Canada (Moore)	7

Team	Final
Switzerland (Müller)	10
West Germany (Schöpp)	4

=== Draw 3 ===
Team	Final
West Germany (Schöpp)	12
Italy (Constantini)	6

Team	Final
Canada (Moore)	4
Sweden (Arfwidsson)	3

Team	Final
Switzerland (Müller)	8
France (Sulpice)	6

Team	Final
Scotland (Torrance)	5
United States (Birklid)	7

Team	Final
Denmark (Blach)	12
Norway (Vanvik)	3

=== Draw 4 ===
Team	Final
Canada (Moore)	8
Switzerland (Müller)	2

Team	Final
Denmark (Blach)	7
United States (Birklid)	6

Team	Final
Norway (Vanvik)	13
Italy (Constantini)	5

Team	Final
West Germany (Schöpp)	5
France (Sulpice)	4

Team	Final
Sweden (Arfwidsson)	9
Scotland (Torrance)	3

=== Draw 5 ===
Team	Final
Denmark (Blach)	7
France (Sulpice)	1

Team	Final
Switzerland (Müller)	6
Scotland (Torrance)	5

Team	Final
Canada (Moore)	6
West Germany (Schöpp)	5

Team	Final
Norway (Vanvik)	9
Sweden (Arfwidsson)	4

Team	Final
Italy (Constantini)	3
United States (Birklid)	8

=== Draw 6 ===
Team	Final
Italy (Constantini)	3
Sweden (Arfwidsson)	10

Team	Final
United States (Birklid)	3
West Germany (Schöpp)	7

Team	Final
Scotland (Torrance)	10
Norway (Vanvik)	4

Team	Final
Switzerland (Müller)	8
Denmark (Blach)	5

Team	Final
Canada (Moore)	7
France (Sulpice)	5

=== Draw 7 ===
Team	Final
Norway (Vanvik)	10
United States (Birklid)	9

Team	Final
Italy (Constantini)	3
Canada (Moore)	10

Team	Final
Sweden (Arfwidsson)	6
Switzerland (Müller)	11

Team	Final
France (Sulpice)	4
Scotland (Torrance)	6

Team	Final
West Germany (Schöpp)	10
Denmark (Blach)	3

=== Draw 8 ===
Team	Final
Scotland (Torrance)	4
West Germany (Schöpp)	2

Team	Final
Sweden (Arfwidsson)	5
France (Sulpice)	3

Team	Final
Italy (Constantini)	7
Denmark (Blach)	5

Team	Final
Canada (Moore)	4
Norway (Vanvik)	8

Team	Final
United States (Birklid)	4
Switzerland (Müller)	10

=== Draw 9 ===
Team	Final
Sweden (Arfwidsson)	5
Denmark (Blach)	4

Team	Final
West Germany (Schöpp)	10
Norway (Vanvik)	3

Team	Final
France (Sulpice)	10
United States (Birklid)	2

Team	Final
Italy (Constantini)	3
Switzerland (Müller)	10

Team	Final
Scotland (Torrance)	8
Canada (Moore)	3

== Tiebreaker ==
Team	Final
West Germany (Schöpp)	4
Scotland (Torrance)	10

== Playoffs ==
Semifinals
1	Switzerland	3
4	Scotland	4
2	Canada	6
3	Sweden	4

Final
4	Scotland	2
2	Canada	5
Bronze Medal Game
1	Switzerland	6
3	Sweden	4

=== Semifinals ===
Team	Final
Switzerland (Müller)	3
Scotland (Torrance)	4

Team	Final
Canada (Moore)	6
Sweden (Arfwidsson)	4

=== Bronze medal game ===
Team	Final
Switzerland (Müller)	6
Sweden (Arfwidsson)	4

=== Final ===
Team	1	2	3	4	5	6	7	8	9	10	Final
Canada (Moore)	1	0	0	0	1	1	0	1	1	X	5
Scotland (Torrance)	0	0	0	1	0	0	1	0	0	X	2

1985 H&M World Women's Curling Championship
(Canada)
Canada
3rd title
