= Anneli Burman =

Swedish female curler (born 1963)

- Curler ♀
- Born: 13 March 1963 (age 63)

Team
- Curling club: Falu CC, Falun

Curling career
- Member Association: Sweden
- World Championship: 1 (1983)
Medal record
Curling
Swedish Women's Championship
Gold medal – first place	1983

Anneli Burman (born 13 March 1963) is a Swedish curler. She is a 1983 Swedish women's champion and three-time Swedish mixed champion (1987, 1989, 1990).

== Teams ==
=== Women's ===
Season	Skip	Third	Second	Lead	Events
1982–83	Anneli Burman	Brita Lindholm	Mait Bjurström	Katarina Lässker	SWCC 1983 (gold); WCC 1983 (4th)

=== Mixed ===
Season	Skip	Third	Second	Lead	Events
1987	Per Hedén	Anneli Burman	Jan Strandlund	Annica Ericsson	SMxCC 1987 (gold)
1989	Per Hedén	Anneli Burman	Jan Strandlund	Annica Ericsson	SMxCC 1989 (gold)
1990	Per Hedén	Anneli Burman	Jan Strandlund	Annica Ericsson	SMxCC 1990 (gold)

== Personal life ==
Her younger brother is a curler Magnus Burman, he played for Sweden in the 1990 World Junior Championships.
