= 1984 World Junior Curling Championships =

- Host city: Cornwall, Ontario, Canada
- Arena: Cornwall Civic Complex
- Dates: March 11–17
- Men's winner: United States (2nd title)
- Skip: Al Edwards
- Third: Mark Larson
- Second: Dewey Basley
- Lead: Kurt Disher
- Finalist: Switzerland (André Flotron)

The 1984 World Junior Curling Championships were held from March 11 to 17 at the Cornwall Civic Complex in Cornwall, Ontario, Canada. The tournament only consisted of a men's event.

== Teams ==
Country	Skip	Third	Second	Lead	Curling club
Canada	Jamie Schneider	Dan Femer	Steven Leippi	Kelly Vollman	
Denmark	Ulrik Schmidt	Michael Pedersen	Anders Søderblom	Palle Poulsen	Hvidovre CC
France	Dominique Dupont-Roc	Philippe Pomi	Christian Dupont-Roc	Thierry Mercier	
West Germany	Johnny Jahr	Philip Seitz	Carsten Schwartz	Dirk Hornung	
Italy	Stefano Ossi	Paolo Constantini	Andrea Pappacena	Sandro Fachin	
Norway	Morten Skaug	Olav Saugstad	Tom Sørlundsengen	Helge Smeby	
Scotland	Mike Hay	David Smith	Gregor Smith	Russell Keiller	
Sweden	Jan Strandlund	Ulf Vallgren	Kent Hammarström	Thomas Andersson	Sundsvalls CK
Switzerland	André Flotron	Andreas Hänni	Daniel Gutknecht	André Szodoray	
United States	Al Edwards	Mark Larson	Dewey Basley	Kurt Disher	

== Round robin ==
Place	Team	1	2	3	4	5	6	7	8	9	10	Wins	Losses
1	Switzerland	*	7:3	5:4	3:1	6:4	6:2	11:1	5:3	10:2	9:2	9	0
2	United States	3:7	*	7:6	4:3	6:8	6:5	7:4	11:2	7:6	9:3	7	2
3	Scotland	4:5	6:7	*	3:2	4:3	4:1	6:2	5:3	4:9	12:3	6	3
4	Canada	1:3	3:4	2:3	*	3:4	11:4	6:0	4:2	7:2	10:2	5	4
5	Norway	4:6	8:6	3:4	4:3	*	2:7	6:4	5:6	12:4	10:1	5	4
6	Sweden	2:6	5:6	1:4	4:11	7:2	*	12:2	7:6	8:4	14:4	5	4
7	Germany	1:11	4:7	2:6	0:6	4:6	2:12	*	7:3	8:2	10:0	3	6
8	France	3:5	2:11	3:5	2:4	6:5	6:7	3:7	*	7:3	9:4	3	6
9	Denmark	2:10	6:7	9:4	2:7	4:12	4:8	2:8	3:7	*	8:2	2	7
10	Italy	2:9	3:9	3:12	2:10	1:10	4:14	0:10	4:9	2:8	*	0	9

Team to playoffs (final)
Teams to playoffs (semifinal)

== Playoffs ==
Semifinal
1	Switzerland
2	United States	4
3	Scotland	1

Gold Medal Game
1	Switzerland	6
2	United States	7

== Final standings ==
Place	Team	Games played	Wins	Losses
1st place, gold medalist(s)	United States	11	9	2
2nd place, silver medalist(s)	Switzerland	10	9	1
3rd place, bronze medalist(s)	Scotland	10	6	4
4	Canada	9	5	4
5	Norway	9	5	4
6	Sweden	9	5	4
7	Germany	9	3	6
8	France	9	3	6
9	Denmark	9	2	7
10	Italy	9	0	9

== Awards ==
- WJCC Sportsmanship Award: (United States) Al Edwards

All-Star Team:

- Skip: (Switzerland) André Flotron
- Third: (Switzerland) Andreas Hänni
- Second: (United States) Dewey Basley
- Lead: (Canada) Kelly Vollman
