= Swiss Women's Curling Championship =

National championship of women's curling in Switzerland

- Established: 1964
- 2026 host city: Bern, Switzerland
- 2026 arena: Curling Bern
- 2026 champion: Xenia Schwaller

The Swiss Women's Curling Championship is the national championship of women's curling in Switzerland. It has been held annually since 1964.

== List of champions ==
*World champions in bold

*Alternates in italics

Year	Skip	Club
2026	Xenia Schwaller, Selina Gafner, Fabienne Rieder, Selina Rychiger	CG Zurich
2025	Corrie Hürlimann, Marina Lörtscher, Stefanie Berset, Celine Schwizgebel	CC Zug
2024	Alina Pätz (Fourth), Silvana Tirinzoni (Skip), Selina Witschonke, Carole Howald	Aarau CC
2023	**Alina Pätz (Fourth), Silvana Tirinzoni (Skip), Carole Howald, Briar Schwaller-Hürlimann**	Aarau CC
2022	**Alina Pätz (Fourth), Silvana Tirinzoni (Skip), Esther Neuenschwander, Melanie Barbezat, Carole Howald**	Aarau CC
2021	**Alina Pätz (Fourth), Silvana Tirinzoni (Skip), Esther Neuenschwander, Melanie Barbezat, Marlene Albrecht**	Aarau CC
2020	Briar Hürlimann (Fourth), Elena Stern (Skip), Lisa Gisler, Céline Koller, Christine Urech	Oberwallis
2019	**Alina Pätz (Fourth), Silvana Tirinzoni (Skip), Esther Neuenschwander, Melanie Barbezat, Marisa Winkelhausen**	Aarau CC
2018	Binia Feltscher, Irene Schori, Franziska Kaufmann, Carole Howald	Flims CC
2017	Alina Pätz, Nadine Lehmann, Marisa Winkelhausen, Nicole Schwägli	Baden Regio HBL
2016	**Binia Feltscher, Irene Schori, Franziska Kaufmann, Christine Urech, Carole Howald**	Flims CC
2015	**Alina Pätz, Nadine Lehmann, Marisa Winkelhausen, Nicole Schwägli**	CC Baden Regio
2014	**Binia Feltscher, Irene Schori, Franziska Kaufmann, Christine Urech, Carole Howald**	Flims CC
2013	Silvana Tirinzoni, Marlene Albrecht, Esther Neuenschwander, Sandra Gantenbein, Anna Neuenschwander	Aarau CC
2012	**Mirjam Ott, Carmen Schäfer, Carmen Küng, Janine Greiner**	Davos CC
2011	Mirjam Ott, Carmen Schäfer, Carmen Küng, Janine Greiner	Davos CC
2010	Binia Feltscher-Beeli, Corrine Bourquin, Sibille Bühlmann, Sandra Ramstein, Yvonne Schlunegger	Flims PurePower
2009	Mirjam Ott, Carmen Schäfer, Valeria Spälty, Janine Greiner	Davos IFAS
2008	Mirjam Ott, Carmen Schäfer, Valeria Spälty, Janine Greiner	Davos IFAS
2007	Silvana Tirinzoni, Anna Neuenschwander, Esther Neuenschwander, Sandra Attinger	Dübendorf peterbau.ch
2006	Mirjam Ott, Binia Beeli, Valeria Spälty, Michèle Moser	Flims PurePower
2005	Silvana Tirinzoni, Sandra Attinger, Anna Neuenschwander, Esther Neuenschwander, Martina von Arx	Dübendorf peterbau.ch
2004	Mirjam Ott, Binia Beeli, Brigitte Schori, Michèle Knobel, Andrea Stöckli	Flims - die Alpenarena
2003	Luzia Ebnöther, Carmen Küng, Tanya Frei, Nadia Röthlisberger-Raspe	Bern CC AAM
2002	Selina Breuleux (Fourth), Nicole Strausak (Skip), Madlaina Breuleux, Bianca Röthlisberger, Anita Jäggi	Bern CC
2001	Manuela Kormann, Andrea Stöckli, Christina Schönbächler, Jeannine Probst, Tanja Bongni	Zug
2000	Nadja Heuer, Carmen Küng, Sybil Bachofen, Vera Heuer, Yvonne Schlunegger	Solothurn-Wengi
1999	Luzia Ebnöther, Nicole Strausak, Tanya Frei, Nadia Raspe, Andrea Stöckli	Bern CC
1998	Cristina Lestander, Selina Breuleux, Madlaina Breuleux, Annick Lusser, Sandra Arnold	Zug
1997	Mirjam Ott, Manuela Kormann, Franziska von Känel, Caroline Balz, Marianne Flotron	Bern CC
1996	Caroline Gruss, Corinne Anneler, Sylvie Meillaud, Sahel Rieser, Barbara Schenkel	Lausanne-Nestlé
1995	Graziella Grichting, Selina Breuleux, Madlaina Breuleux, Ingrid Müller, Claudia Biner	Leukerbad
1994	Angela Lutz, Laurence Bidaud, Laurence Morisetti, Sandrine Mercier	Lausanne-Olympique
1993	Janet Hürlimann, Angela Lutz, Laurence Bidaud, Sandrine Mercier	Lausanne-Olympique
1992	Janet Hürlimann, Angela Lutz, Laurence Bidaud, Sandrine Mercier	Lausanne-Olympique
1991	Janet Hürlimann, Claudia Bärtschi, Jutta Tanner, Corinne Anneler	Zug
1990	Brigitte Leutenegger, Gisela Peter, Marianne Gutknecht, Karin Leutenegger	Utikon-Waldegg
1989	Cristina Lestander, Barbara Meier, Ingrid Thulin, Katrin Peterhans	Bern-Egghölzli
1988	Erika Müller, Brigitte Kienast, Susanne Luchsinger, Regula Rüegg	Wetzikon
1987	Marianne Flotron, Gisela Peter, Beatrice Frei, Caroline Rück	Winterthur
1986	Erika Müller, Irene Bürgi, Barbara Meier, Cristina Lestander	Bern-Egghölzli
1985	Erika Müller, Barbara Meyer, Barbara Meier, Franziska Jöhr	Bern-Egghölzli
1984	Brigitte Kienast, Irene Bürgi, Erika Frewein, Evi Rüegsegger	Wetzikon
1983	**Erika Müller, Barbara Meyer, Barbara Meier, Cristina Wirz**	Bern-Egghölzli
1982	Erika Müller, Barbara Meyer, Nicole Oetliker, Cristina Wirz	Bern-Egghölzli
1981	Susan Schlapbach, Irene Bürgi, Ursula Schlapbach, Katrin Peterhans	Bern-Damen
1980	Gaby Charrière, Marie-Louise Favre, Cécilie Blanvillian, Marianne Uhlmann	Lausanne-Beau-Rivage
1979	**Gaby Casanova, Betty Bourquin, Linda Thommen, Rosi Manger**	Basel-Albeina
1978	Heidi Attinger, Dorli Broger, Brigitte Kienast, Evi Rüegsegger	Dübendorf
1977	Nicole Zloczower, Romy Steffen, Ebe Beyeler, Nelly Mosher	Bern-City Damen
1976	Urica Baer, Mengia Baumgartner, Regula Suter, Melanie Bischof	Küsnacht ZH
1975	Berty Schriber, Marcelle Muheim, Madelaine Buffoni, Liselotte Schriber	Weggis
1974	Berty Schriber, Yvonne Würth, Madelaine Buffoni, Liselotte Schriber	Weggis
1973	Anita Viscolo, Liliane Crosa, Cathy Perrig, Musy Schmidhalter	Montana-Vermala
1972	Vreny Schütz, Erika Müller, Dora Loosli, Sonja Rohrer	Arosa-Damen
1971	Trudy Affentranger (Fourth), Erna Mitchell-Steuri, Heidi Dimtza-Steuri (Skip), Hildi Hunziker	Grindelwald-Swiss
1970	Rita Rampinelli (Fourth), Marianne Oechslin (Skip), Hildi Kämpf, Kathrin Anhoeck	Schaffhausen
1969	Rita Rampinelli (Fourth), Marianne Oechslin (Skip), Hildi Kämpf, Kathrin Anhoeck	Schaffhausen
1968	Edith Bornstein, Vreny Schütz, Erika Müller, Heidy Stäger	Arosa-Damen
1967	Rita Rampinelli (Fourth), Marianne Oechslin (Skip), Hildi Kämpf, Kathrin Anhoeck	Schaffhausen
1966	Annemarie Steuri, Klara Lauener, Manon Schudel, Charlotte Urban	Grindelwald-Damen
1965	Thea Weiss, Berthli Marti, Ruth Stauffer, Trudi Gloor	Davos-Village
1964	Heidi Dimtza-Steuri, Erna Mitchell-Steuri, Berteli Rüedi, Hedi Waser	Zürich-Damen

== See also ==
- Swiss Men's Curling Championship
- Swiss Mixed Doubles Curling Championship
- Swiss Mixed Curling Championship
- Swiss Junior Curling Championships
- Swiss Junior Mixed Doubles Curling Championship
- Swiss Senior Curling Championships
- Swiss Wheelchair Curling Championship
