= Billie-May Muirhead =

Scottish curler

- Curler ♀

Team
- Curling club: Airleywight Ladies CC, Perth

Curling career
- Member Association: Scotland
- World Championship: 1 (1983)
Medal record
Curling
Scottish Women's Championship
| Gold medal – first place | 1983 |
| Silver medal – second place | 1988 |

Billie-May Muirhead is a Scottish curler.

At the international level, she competed as lead for Scotland at the 1983 World Championship (they finished 6th).

At the national level, she is a 1983 Scottish women's champion curler.

== Teams ==
| Season | Skip | Third | Second | Lead | Events |
|---|---|---|---|---|---|
| 1982–83 | Hazel McGregor | Jane Ramsey | Betty McGregor | Billie-May Muirhead | SWCC 1983 (gold); WWCC 1983 (6th) |
| 1987–88 | Jane Gallagher | Kathy Cameron | Billie-May Muirhead | Jennifer Blair | SWCC 1988 (silver) |
