= Alvhild Fugelmo =

Norwegian female curler

- Curler ♀

Team
- Curling club: Trondheim CC. Trondheim

Curling career
- Member Association: Norway
- World Championship: 2 (1983, 1985)
Medal record
Curling
World Championships
Silver medal – second place	1983 Moose Jaw
Norwegian Women's Championship
Gold medal – first place	1983
Gold medal – first place	1985

Alvhild Fugelmo is a former Norwegian curler.

She is a 1983 World women's silver medallist.

== Teams ==
Season	Skip	Third	Second	Lead	Events
1982–83	Eva Vanvik	Åse Vanvik	Alvhild Fugelmo	Liv Grøseth	NWCC 1983 (gold); WCC 1983 (silver)
1984–85	Eva Vanvik	Åse Vanvik	Alvhild Fugelmo	Else Skogan	NWCC 1985 (gold); WCC 1985 (7th)
