= Dirk Hornung =

German curler

- Curler ♂

Team
- Curling club: CC Hamburg

Curling career
- Member Association: Germany
- World Championship: 1 (1996)
- European Championship: 1 (1990)
- Other appearances: World Junior Championships: 1 (1984)

Dirk Hornung is a German curler.

== Teams ==
Season	Skip	Third	Second	Lead	Alternate	Events
1983–84	Johnny Jahr	Philip Seitz	Carsten Schwartz	Dirk Hornung		WJCC 1984 (7th)
1990–91	Rodger Gustaf Schmidt	Philip Seitz	Johnny Jahr	Andreas Feldenkirchen	Dirk Hornung, Joackim Fendske	ECC 1990 (10th)
1995–96	Johnny Jahr	Sven Goldemann	Andreas Feldenkirchen	Till Thomsen	Dirk Hornung	WCC 1996 (9th)
