= Anders Søderblom =

Danish male curler

- Curler ♂
- Born: 16 May 1963 (age 63)

Team
- Curling club: Hvidovre CC, Hvidovre

Curling career
- Member Association: Denmark
- World Championship: 5 (1989, 1990, 1991, 1998, 2011)
- European Championship: 5 (1990, 1992, 1993, 1995, 1998)
- Other appearances: World Junior Championships: 1 (1984)
Medal record
Curling
World Championships
Bronze medal – third place	1990 Västerås
European Championships
Silver medal – second place	1993 Leukerbad
Danish Men's Championship
Gold medal – first place	1989
Gold medal – first place	1990
Gold medal – first place	1992
Gold medal – first place	1997
Gold medal – first place	1998
Gold medal – first place	2011

Anders Søderblom (born 16 May 1963) is a Danish curler. He came third in the 1990 World Men's Championships.

== Teams ==
Season	Skip	Third	Second	Lead	Alternate	Coach	Events
1983–84	Ulrik Schmidt	Michael Pedersen	Anders Søderblom	Palle Poulsen			DJCC 1984 (gold); WJCC 1984 (9th)
1988–89	Tommy Stjerne	Per Berg	Peter Andersen	Anders Søderblom	Ivan Frederiksen		DMCC 1989 (gold); WCC 1989 (6th)
1989–90	Tommy Stjerne	Per Berg	Peter Andersen	Ivan Frederiksen	Anders Søderblom		DMCC 1990 (gold); WCC 1990 (bronze)
1990–91	Tommy Stjerne	Per Berg	Ivan Frederiksen	Anders Søderblom	Peter Andersen		ECC 1990 (9th)
1990–91	Christian Thune	Niels Siggaard	Henrik Jakobsen	Lasse Lavrsen	Anders Søderblom		WCC 1991 (8th)
1991–92	Tommy Stjerne	Per Berg	Peter Andersen	Anders Søderblom	Ivan Frederiksen		DMCC 1992 (gold)
1992–93	Tommy Stjerne	Per Berg	Peter Andersen	Ivan Frederiksen	Anders Søderblom		ECC 1992 (8th)
1993–94	Tommy Stjerne	Per Berg	Peter Andersen	Ivan Frederiksen	Anders Søderblom		ECC 1993 (silver)
1994–95	Tommy Stjerne	Anders Søderblom	Peter Andersen	Ivan Frederiksen			
1995–96	Tommy Stjerne	Per Berg	Peter Andersen	Ivan Frederiksen	Anders Søderblom	Frants Gufler	ECC 1995 (9th)
1997–98	Tommy Stjerne	Gert Larsen	Peter Andersen	Ivan Frederiksen	Anders Søderblom		DMCC 1998 (gold); WCC 1998 (7th)
1998–99	Tommy Stjerne	Gert Larsen	Peter Andersen	Ivan Frederiksen	Anders Søderblom	Mikael Qvist, Olle Brudsten	ECC 1998 (7th)
2010–11	Tommy Stjerne	Anders Søderblom	Peter Andersen	Ivan Frederiksen	Per Berg		DMCC 2011 (gold)
2010–11	Tommy Stjerne	Per Berg	Peter Andersen	Anders Søderblom	Jan Nebelong	Rasmus Stjerne	WCC 2011 (12th)
2011–12	Tommy Stjerne	Per Berg	Peter Andersen	Anders Søderblom	Jan Nebelong		DMCC 2012 (???th)
2012–13	Tommy Stjerne	Anders Søderblom	Per Berg	Ivan Frederiksen	Peter Andersen		DMCC 2013 (4th)
2013–14	Tommy Stjerne	Per Berg	Peter Andersen	Anders Søderblom	Ivan Frederiksen		DMCC 2014 (6th)
2014–15	Tommy Stjerne	Anders Søderblom	Peter Andersen	Ivan Frederiksen			
