= Else Skogan =

Norwegian curler (born 1963)

- Curler ♀

Team
- Curling club: Trondheim CC. Trondheim

Curling career
- Member Association: Norway
- World Championship: 1 (1985)
Medal record
Curling
Norwegian Women's Championship
Gold medal – first place	1985
Norwegian Mixed Championship
Gold medal – first place	2000

Else Skogan is a former Norwegian curler.

At the national level, she is a Norwegian women's champion curler (1985) and mixed champion curler (2000).

== Teams ==
=== Women's ===
Season	Skip	Third	Second	Lead	Events
1984–85	Eva Vanvik	Åse Vanvik	Alvhild Fugelmo	Else Skogan	NWCC 1985 (gold); WCC 1985 (7th)

=== Mixed ===
Season	Skip	Third	Second	Lead	Events
1999–00	Stig Høiberg	Grethe Wolan	Christian Jørgensen	Else Skogan	NMxCC 2000 (gold)
