= 2022 World Senior Curling Championships =

Curling Competition

- Host city: Geneva, Switzerland
- Arena: Geneva Sous-Moulin Sports Center
- Dates: April 23–30
- Men's winner: Canada
- Curling club: Saville Community SC, Edmonton, Alberta
- Skip: Wade White
- Third: Barry Chwedoruk
- Second: Dan Holowaychuk
- Lead: George White
- Coach: Bill Tschirhart
- Finalist: Czech Republic (Šik)
- Women's winner: Switzerland
- Skip: Cristina Lestander
- Third: Sandra Born
- Second: Silvia Gygax
- Lead: Christina Gartenmann
- Alternate: Karin Durtschi
- Coach: Christian Bangerter
- Finalist: United States (Smith)

The 2022 World Senior Curling Championships was held from April 23 to 30 at the Curling Club Trois-Chêne in the Geneva Sous-Moulin Sports Center in Thônex, a suburb of Geneva, Switzerland. The event was held alongside the 2022 World Mixed Doubles Curling Championship.

== Medallists ==
Senior	Gold	Silver	Bronze
Men	Canada; Wade White; Barry Chwedoruk; Dan Holowaychuk; George White	Czech Republic; David Šik; Karel Hradec; David Havlena; Marek Brožek; Jiří Chobot	Sweden; Mats Wranå; Mikael Hasselborg; Anders Eriksson; Gerry Wåhlin; Per Noréen
Women	Switzerland; Cristina Lestander; Sandra Born; Silvia Gygax; Christina Gartenmann; Karin Durtschi	United States; Margie Smith; Ann Swisshelm; Shelly Kosal; Shelley Dropkin	Scotland; Mairi Milne (Fourth); Edith Hazard (Skip); Wendy Johnston; Katie Loudon; Jackie Lockhart

== Men ==
=== Teams ===
The teams are listed as follows:

Australia	Belgium	Canada
Skip: Hugh Millikin; Third: Steve Johns; Second: James Boyd; Lead: Hamish Lorrain-Smith; Alternate: Geoff Davis	Skip: John Robillard; Third: Gery Hermans; Second: Peter Suter; Lead: Stephane Vandermeern; Alternate: Wayne Fitzpatrick	Skip: Wade White; Third: Barry Chwedoruk; Second: Dan Holowaychuk; Lead: George White
Czech Republic	Denmark	England
Skip: David Šik; Third: Karel Hradec; Second: David Havlena; Lead: Marek Brožek; Alternate: Jiří Chobot	Skip: Bent Kristoffersen; Third: Hans Peter Schack; Second: Tommy Kristoffersen; Lead: Soeren Kristensen; Alternate: Matthias Schack	Skip: John Brown; Third: Steve Amann; Second: Martin Gregory; Lead: Andrew Robbins; Alternate: Thomas Campbell
Finland	Germany	Hungary
Skip: Timo Kauste; Third: Tapani Haerkaelae; Second: Petri Kauste; Lead: Markku Olshin; Alternate: Markku Isoviita	Skip: Andy Kapp; Third: Oliver Axnick; Second: Holger Höhne; Lead: Andreas Kempf; Alternate: Matthias Zobel	Skip: Peter Sardi; Third: Zoltàn Jakab; Second: Gàbor Bartalus; Lead: Sándor Asztalos; Alternate: György Nagy
Ireland	Italy	Latvia
Skip: Johnjo Kenny; Third: Bill Gray; Second: David Whyte; Lead: Neil Fyfe; Alternate: Ross Barr	Fourth: Carlo Mosaner; Skip: Sergio Serafini; Second: Fabiano Filippi; Lead: Carlo Arman; Alternate: Luca Gilberti	Skip: Ansis Regža; Third: Jānis Rēdlihs; Second: Aivars Puramalis; Lead: Aivars Gulbis; Alternate: Dzintars Bērziņš
New Zealand	Nigeria	Norway
Skip: Dave Watt; Third: Iain Craig; Second: Lorne DePape; Lead: Ian Ford	Skip: Tijani Cole; Third: Charles Neimeth; Second: Robert Brianne; Lead: Daniel Damola; Alternate: Mark Suratt	Skip: Flemming Davanger; Third: Bent Ramsfjell; Second: Espen de Lange; Lead: Morten Tveit; Alternate: Robert Wood
Scotland	Slovakia	Sweden
Skip: Keith Prentice; Third: John Davie; Second: John Dowell; Lead: Michael Ferguson; Alternate: Robert Anderson	Skip: Milan Bubenik; Third: Peter Mocek; Second: Lubomír Malý; Lead: Daniel Sýkora; Alternate: Karol Pospíchal	Skip: Mats Wranå; Third: Mikael Hasselborg; Second: Anders Eriksson; Lead: Gerry Wåhlin; Alternate: Per Noréen
Switzerland	Turkey	United States
Skip: Christof Schwaller; Third: Robert Hürlimann; Second: Christoph Kaiser; Lead: Rolf Iseli; Alternate: Pierre Hug	Fourth: Fikret Çatak; Skip: Murat Akın; Second: Selami Yıldız; Lead: Azamet Ust	Skip: Bob LeClair; Third: Fred Maxie; Second: Jeff Baird; Lead: Tom Danielson; Alternate: Greg Gallagher

=== Round-robin standings ===
Final round-robin standings

Key
Teams to Playoffs

Group A	Skip	W	L	W–L	DSC
Canada	Wade White	6	0	–	33.90
United States	Bob LeClair	5	1	–	60.43
Italy	Sergio Serafini	4	2	–	72.94
Finland	Timo Kauste	3	3	–	96.54
Australia	Hugh Millikin	2	4	–	53.76
Turkey	Murat Akın	1	5	–	104.00
Slovakia	Milan Bubenik	0	6	–	150.85

Group B	Skip	W	L	W–L	DSC
Sweden	Mats Wranå	6	0	–	28.31
Czech Republic	David Šik	4	2	1–0	51.44
Switzerland	Christof Schwaller	4	2	0–1	67.27
Norway	Flemming Davanger	3	3	–	46.32
Hungary	Peter Sardi	2	4	1–0	93.65
Ireland	Johnjo Kenny	2	4	0–1	59.24
England	John Brown	0	6	–	70.14

Group C	Skip	W	L	W–L	DSC
Germany	Andy Kapp	6	0	–	36.22
Scotland	Keith Prentice	4	2	1–0	43.40
Belgium	John Robillard	4	2	0–1	89.49
Denmark	Bent Kristoffersen	3	3	–	88.85
Latvia	Ansis Regža	2	4	1–0	53.48
New Zealand	Dave Watt	2	4	0–1	61.22
Nigeria	Tijani Cole	0	6	–	159.73

Group A Round Robin Summary Table
Pos.	Country	Australia	Canada	Finland	Italy	Slovakia	Turkey	United States	Record
5	Australia	—N/a	6–10	4–7	2–6	10–2	7–4	5–6	2–4
1	Canada	10–6	—	6–3	9–3	12–3	14–0	10–3	6–0
4	Finland	7–4	3–6	—	1–9	9–2	8–2	3–7	3–3
3	Italy	6–2	3–9	9–1	—	7–6	10–7	2–12	4–2
7	Slovakia	2–10	3–12	2–9	6–7	—	4–6	2–10	0–6
6	Turkey	4–7	0–14	2–8	7–10	6–4	—	3–7	1–5
2	United States	6–5	3–10	7–3	12–2	10–2	7–3	—	5–1

Group B Round Robin Summary Table
Pos.	Country	Czech Republic	England	Hungary		Norway	Sweden	Switzerland	Record
2	Czech Republic	—	7–4	8–4	7–6	4–8	5–7	9–3	4–2
7	England	4–7	—	2–10	2–9	5–6	3–10	2–10	0–6
5	Hungary	4–8	10–2	—	6–4	5–11	3–7	3–6	2–4
6	Ireland	6–7	9–2	4–6	—	8–7	3–10	5–7	2–4
4	Norway	8–4	6–5	11–5	7–8	—	6–7	4–10	3–3
1	Sweden	7–5	10–3	7–3	10–3	7–6	—	8–3	6–0
3	Switzerland	3–9	10–2	6–3	7–5	10–4	3–8	—	4–2

Group C Round Robin Summary Table
Pos.	Country	Belgium	Denmark	Germany	Latvia	New Zealand	Nigeria	Scotland	Record
3	Belgium	—	9–1	4–5	8–7	7–5	11–1	6–7	4–2
4	Denmark	1–9	—	1–6	7–6	9–8	12–2	7–8	3–3
1	Germany	5–4	6–1	—	15–1	7–3	16–3	5–4	6–0
5	Latvia	7–8	6–7	1–15	—	8–4	16–1	2–9	2–4
6	New Zealand	5–7	8–9	3–7	4–8	—	10–2	6–5	2–4
7	Nigeria	1–11	2–12	3–16	1–16	2–10	—	3–21	0–6
2	Scotland	7–6	8–7	4–5	9–2	5–6	21–3	—	4–2

=== Round-robin results ===
All draw times are listed in Central European Summer Time (UTC+02:00).

==== Draw 1 ====
Saturday, April 23, 8:00

Sheet B	1	2	3	4	5	6	7	8	Final
Turkey (Akın)	1	0	1	0	0	0	1	X	3
United States (LeClair) 🔨	0	2	0	0	3	2	0	X	7

Sheet C	1	2	3	4	5	6	7	8	Final
Nigeria (Cole) 🔨	1	0	0	0	0	1	0	X	2
Denmark (Kristoffersen)	0	3	2	2	4	0	1	X	12

Sheet D	1	2	3	4	5	6	7	8	Final
Canada (White) 🔨	2	1	1	0	2	0	0	X	6
Finland (Kauste)	0	0	0	1	0	1	1	X	3

Sheet F	1	2	3	4	5	6	7	8	Final
Ireland (Kenny) 🔨	0	3	0	1	1	1	3	X	9
England (Brown)	1	0	1	0	0	0	0	X	2

==== Draw 2 ====
Saturday, April 23, 12:00

Sheet B	1	2	3	4	5	6	7	8	Final
Germany (Kapp)	1	0	0	1	0	2	0	1	5
Scotland (Prentice) 🔨	0	1	1	0	1	0	1	0	4

Sheet C	1	2	3	4	5	6	7	8	Final
Czech Republic (Šik) 🔨	0	2	2	0	0	5	X	X	9
Switzerland (Schwaller)	1	0	0	1	1	0	X	X	3

Sheet D	1	2	3	4	5	6	7	8	Final
Norway (Davanger)	0	1	0	3	1	1	0	0	6
Sweden (Wranå) 🔨	2	0	0	0	0	0	4	1	7

Sheet E	1	2	3	4	5	6	7	8	Final
Belgium (Robillard) 🔨	0	1	4	0	1	0	0	1	7
New Zealand (Watt)	1	0	0	1	0	2	1	0	5

==== Draw 3 ====
Saturday, April 23, 16:00

Sheet B	1	2	3	4	5	6	7	8	Final
Denmark (Kristoffersen)	0	1	0	3	1	0	2	0	7
Latvia (Regža) 🔨	1	0	2	0	0	1	0	2	6

Sheet E	1	2	3	4	5	6	7	8	Final
Hungary (Sardi)	0	0	1	2	0	2	1	X	6
Ireland (Kenny) 🔨	1	2	0	0	1	0	0	X	4

Sheet F	1	2	3	4	5	6	7	8	Final
Canada (White) 🔨	4	4	0	0	4	0	X	X	12
Slovakia (Bubenik)	0	0	0	1	0	2	X	X	3

==== Draw 4 ====
Saturday, April 23, 20:00

Sheet E	1	2	3	4	5	6	7	8	Final
Australia (Millikin)	0	0	0	0	2	0	0	X	2
Italy (Serafini) 🔨	1	1	0	1	0	2	1	X	6

==== Draw 5 ====
Sunday, April 24, 9:00

Sheet B	1	2	3	4	5	6	7	8	Final
Switzerland (Schwaller) 🔨	2	1	0	1	0	2	0	X	6
Hungary (Sardi)	0	0	1	0	1	0	1	X	3

Sheet C	1	2	3	4	5	6	7	8	Final
New Zealand (Watt)	1	0	0	0	2	0	1	X	4
Latvia (Regža) 🔨	0	1	2	1	0	4	0	X	8

Sheet D	1	2	3	4	5	6	7	8	Final
Slovakia (Bubenik)	1	1	0	0	0	1	1	0	4
Turkey (Akın) 🔨	0	0	2	1	2	0	0	1	6

Sheet E	1	2	3	4	5	6	7	8	Final
Norway (Davanger) 🔨	2	0	1	1	1	1	0	2	8
Czech Republic (Šik)	0	2	0	0	0	0	2	0	4

==== Draw 6 ====
Sunday, April 24, 14:00

Sheet D	1	2	3	4	5	6	7	8	9	Final
United States (LeClair)	0	0	1	0	0	0	2	2	1	6
Australia (Millikin) 🔨	0	1	0	0	4	0	0	0	0	5

Sheet E	1	2	3	4	5	6	7	8	Final
England (Brown)	0	1	0	0	0	2	X	X	3
Sweden (Wranå) 🔨	4	0	0	2	4	0	X	X	10

==== Draw 7 ====
Sunday, April 24, 19:00

Sheet C	1	2	3	4	5	6	7	8	Final
Germany (Kapp) 🔨	1	0	0	2	0	0	2	0	5
Belgium (Robillard)	0	0	1	0	1	1	0	1	4

Sheet D	1	2	3	4	5	6	7	8	Final
Nigeria (Cole)	0	0	2	0	1	0	0	X	3
Scotland (Prentice) 🔨	5	2	0	5	0	4	5	X	21

Sheet E	1	2	3	4	5	6	7	8	Final
Italy (Serafini)	0	3	2	0	1	3	X	X	9
Finland (Kauste) 🔨	0	0	0	1	0	0	X	X	1

==== Draw 8 ====
Monday, April 25, 8:00

Sheet B	1	2	3	4	5	6	7	8	Final
Norway (Davanger)	0	2	1	0	3	0	0	1	7
Ireland (Kenny) 🔨	2	0	0	1	0	4	1	0	8

Sheet C	1	2	3	4	5	6	7	8	Final
Sweden (Wranå) 🔨	0	2	0	1	1	0	3	X	7
Hungary (Sardi)	0	0	2	0	0	1	0	X	3

Sheet D	1	2	3	4	5	6	7	8	Final
Australia (Millikin)	0	1	0	4	0	0	1	0	6
Canada (White) 🔨	3	0	2	0	0	1	0	4	10

Sheet E	1	2	3	4	5	6	7	8	Final
Denmark (Kristoffersen)	0	0	0	0	0	1	X	X	1
Germany (Kapp) 🔨	2	0	2	1	1	0	X	X	6

Sheet F	1	2	3	4	5	6	7	8	Final
Latvia (Regža)	0	0	0	2	0	0	X	X	2
Scotland (Prentice) 🔨	1	2	3	0	0	3	X	X	9

==== Draw 9 ====
Monday, April 25, 12:00

Sheet F	1	2	3	4	5	6	7	8	Final
Finland (Kauste) 🔨	1	0	0	0	0	0	2	X	3
United States (LeClair)	0	1	1	1	3	1	0	X	7

==== Draw 10 ====
Monday, April 25, 16:00

Sheet B	1	2	3	4	5	6	7	8	9	Final
Scotland (Prentice) 🔨	1	0	0	2	0	2	1	0	1	7
Belgium (Robillard)	0	3	1	0	1	0	0	1	0	6

Sheet C	1	2	3	4	5	6	7	8	Final
Italy (Serafini)	0	6	1	0	2	0	0	1	10
Turkey (Akın) 🔨	1	0	0	2	0	2	2	0	7

Sheet D	1	2	3	4	5	6	7	8	Final
England (Brown)	0	2	0	1	0	0	1	X	4
Czech Republic (Šik) 🔨	3	0	2	0	1	1	0	X	7

Sheet E	1	2	3	4	5	6	7	8	Final
Slovakia (Bubenik)	0	0	0	2	0	0	X	X	2
Australia (Millikin) 🔨	1	1	3	0	3	2	X	X	10

Sheet F	1	2	3	4	5	6	7	8	Final
Switzerland (Schwaller)	0	2	3	1	2	0	2	X	10
Norway (Davanger) 🔨	2	0	0	0	0	2	0	X	4

==== Draw 11 ====
Monday, April 25, 20:00

Sheet B	1	2	3	4	5	6	7	8	Final
New Zealand (Watt) 🔨	3	2	1	2	0	0	2	X	10
Nigeria (Cole)	0	0	0	0	1	1	0	X	2

==== Draw 12 ====
Tuesday, April 26, 8:00

Sheet D	1	2	3	4	5	6	7	8	Final
Italy (Serafini) 🔨	0	1	1	0	0	0	X	X	2
United States (LeClair)	2	0	0	6	3	1	X	X	12

==== Draw 13 ====
Tuesday, April 26, 12:00

Sheet C	1	2	3	4	5	6	7	8	Final
Turkey (Akın)	0	0	0	0	0	0	X	X	0
Canada (White) 🔨	4	3	1	2	3	1	X	X	14

Sheet D	1	2	3	4	5	6	7	8	Final
Finland (Kauste) 🔨	1	1	2	0	4	0	1	X	9
Slovakia (Bubenik)	0	0	0	1	0	1	0	X	2

==== Draw 14 ====
Tuesday, April 26, 16:00

Sheet C	1	2	3	4	5	6	7	8	Final
Belgium (Robillard) 🔨	2	1	5	1	1	0	1	X	11
Nigeria (Cole)	0	0	0	0	0	1	0	X	1

Sheet F	1	2	3	4	5	6	7	8	Final
Sweden (Wranå) 🔨	2	2	0	4	2	0	X	X	10
Ireland (Kenny)	0	0	2	0	0	1	X	X	3

==== Draw 15 ====
Tuesday, April 26, 20:00

Sheet C	1	2	3	4	5	6	7	8	Final
Latvia (Regža)	0	0	0	1	0	0	X	X	1
Germany (Kapp) 🔨	1	1	6	0	4	3	X	X	15

Sheet D	1	2	3	4	5	6	7	8	Final
Denmark (Kristoffersen) 🔨	2	2	0	2	0	2	0	1	9
New Zealand (Watt)	0	0	4	0	2	0	2	0	8

Sheet E	1	2	3	4	5	6	7	8	Final
Switzerland (Schwaller) 🔨	4	2	1	0	0	3	X	X	10
England (Brown)	0	0	0	1	1	0	X	X	2

Sheet F	1	2	3	4	5	6	7	8	Final
Czech Republic (Šik) 🔨	3	1	0	3	1	0	X	X	8
Hungary (Sardi)	0	0	1	0	0	3	X	X	4

==== Draw 17 ====
Wednesday, April 27, 12:00

Sheet D	1	2	3	4	5	6	7	8	Final
Ireland (Kenny)	1	0	0	1	1	0	2	X	5
Switzerland (Schwaller) 🔨	0	3	2	0	0	2	0	X	7

Sheet E	1	2	3	4	5	6	7	8	Final
Finland (Kauste)	0	1	1	1	3	0	2	X	8
Turkey (Akın) 🔨	1	0	0	0	0	1	0	X	2

Sheet F	1	2	3	4	5	6	7	8	Final
Germany (Kapp) 🔨	3	1	5	4	3	0	0	X	16
Nigeria (Cole)	0	0	0	0	0	2	1	X	3

==== Draw 18 ====
Wednesday, April 27, 16:00

Sheet B	1	2	3	4	5	6	7	8	Final
Czech Republic (Šik)	1	0	1	0	2	0	0	1	5
Sweden (Wranå) 🔨	0	2	0	2	0	2	1	0	7

Sheet D	1	2	3	4	5	6	7	8	Final
Hungary (Sardi)	0	0	1	0	3	1	0	X	5
Norway (Davanger) 🔨	2	1	0	5	0	0	3	X	11

Sheet F	1	2	3	4	5	6	7	8	9	Final
Scotland (Prentice) 🔨	1	0	1	0	3	0	2	0	1	8
Denmark (Kristoffersen)	0	2	0	2	0	1	0	2	0	7

==== Draw 19 ====
Wednesday, April 27, 20:00

Sheet B	1	2	3	4	5	6	7	8	Final
Canada (White) 🔨	2	1	0	1	3	0	2	X	9
Italy (Serafini)	0	0	2	0	0	1	0	X	3

Sheet C	1	2	3	4	5	6	7	8	Final
United States (LeClair) 🔨	1	2	1	0	4	0	2	X	10
Slovakia (Bubenik)	0	0	0	1	0	1	0	X	2

Sheet E	1	2	3	4	5	6	7	8	Final
Latvia (Regža)	1	0	3	0	0	2	1	0	7
Belgium (Robillard) 🔨	0	2	0	2	1	0	0	3	8

Sheet F	1	2	3	4	5	6	7	8	Final
Turkey (Akın)	0	1	1	0	0	2	0	0	4
Australia (Millikin) 🔨	1	0	0	2	1	0	1	2	7

==== Draw 20 ====
Thursday, April 28, 8:00

Sheet F	1	2	3	4	5	6	7	8	Final
New Zealand (Watt)	0	0	0	1	1	0	1	X	3
Germany (Kapp) 🔨	1	2	2	0	0	2	0	X	7

==== Draw 21 ====
Thursday, April 28, 12:00

Sheet C	1	2	3	4	5	6	7	8	Final
Hungary (Sardi)	3	1	0	1	2	3	X	X	10
England (Brown) 🔨	0	0	2	0	0	0	X	X	2

Sheet D	1	2	3	4	5	6	7	8	Final
Belgium (Robillard)	1	0	3	3	1	1	X	X	9
Denmark (Kristoffersen) 🔨	0	1	0	0	0	0	X	X	1

Sheet E	1	2	3	4	5	6	7	8	Final
Nigeria (Cole)	0	0	0	0	1	0	0	X	1
Latvia (Regža) 🔨	2	3	2	3	0	1	5	X	16

Sheet F	1	2	3	4	5	6	7	8	Final
Slovakia (Bubenik)	0	1	2	2	0	0	1	0	6
Italy (Serafini) 🔨	3	0	0	0	3	0	0	1	7

==== Draw 22 ====
Thursday, April 28, 16:00

Sheet B	1	2	3	4	5	6	7	8	Final
Australia (Millikin) 🔨	0	0	1	0	1	0	2	0	4
Finland (Kauste)	4	0	0	1	0	1	0	1	7

Sheet C	1	2	3	4	5	6	7	8	9	Final
Scotland (Prentice)	0	2	0	0	1	0	0	2	0	5
New Zealand (Watt) 🔨	2	0	1	0	0	0	2	0	1	6

Sheet E	1	2	3	4	5	6	7	8	Final
United States (LeClair)	0	1	0	2	0	0	X	X	3
Canada (White) 🔨	2	0	3	0	1	4	X	X	10

==== Draw 23 ====
Thursday, April 28, 20:00

Sheet B	1	2	3	4	5	6	7	8	9	Final
England (Brown) 🔨	0	1	0	0	1	1	0	2	0	5
Norway (Davanger)	1	0	1	2	0	0	1	0	1	6

Sheet C	1	2	3	4	5	6	7	8	Final
Ireland (Kenny)	0	1	0	3	0	1	1	0	6
Czech Republic (Šik) 🔨	3	0	1	0	2	0	0	1	7

Sheet E	1	2	3	4	5	6	7	8	Final
Sweden (Wranå) 🔨	2	0	1	0	3	0	2	X	8
Switzerland (Schwaller)	0	1	0	1	0	1	0	X	3

=== Playoffs ===
Quarterfinals
1	Sweden	9
8	Italy	2
4	Scotland	5
5	Czech Republic	7
3	Germany	6
6	United States	5
2	Canada	12
7	Switzerland	4

Semifinals
1	Sweden	6
5	Czech Republic	8
3	Germany	5
2	Canada	11

Gold medal game
5	Czech Republic	3
2	Canada	6
Third place
1	Sweden	7
3	Germany	3

==== Quarterfinals ====
Friday, April 29, 9:00

Sheet C	1	2	3	4	5	6	7	8	Final
Scotland (Prentice) 🔨	2	0	0	1	0	0	2	0	5
Czech Republic (Šik)	0	2	2	0	1	1	0	1	7

Sheet D	1	2	3	4	5	6	7	8	Final
Sweden (Wranå) 🔨	2	1	0	3	0	3	X	X	9
Italy (Serafini)	0	0	1	0	1	0	X	X	2

Sheet E	1	2	3	4	5	6	7	8	Final
Canada (White) 🔨	3	5	0	0	4	0	X	X	12
Switzerland (Schwaller)	0	0	1	1	0	2	X	X	4

Sheet F	1	2	3	4	5	6	7	8	9	Final
Germany (Kapp) 🔨	0	2	0	2	0	0	1	0	1	6
United States (LeClair)	0	0	1	0	1	2	0	1	0	5

==== Semifinals ====
Friday, April 29, 19:00

Sheet C	1	2	3	4	5	6	7	8	Final
Germany (Kapp)	1	0	0	3	0	1	0	0	5
Canada (White) 🔨	0	5	1	0	1	0	2	2	11

Sheet E	1	2	3	4	5	6	7	8	Final
Sweden (Wranå) 🔨	1	0	0	3	1	0	1	0	6
Czech Republic (Šik)	0	4	0	0	0	3	0	1	8

==== Bronze medal game ====
Saturday, April 30, 10:30

Sheet B	1	2	3	4	5	6	7	8	Final
Sweden (Wranå)	1	0	1	0	3	1	1	X	7
Germany (Kapp) 🔨	0	2	0	1	0	0	0	X	3

==== Gold medal game ====
Saturday, April 30, 10:30

Sheet D	1	2	3	4	5	6	7	8	Final
Czech Republic (Šik)	0	0	1	0	2	0	0	X	3
Canada (White) 🔨	0	1	0	2	0	2	1	X	6

=== Final standings ===
Place	Team
1st place, gold medalist(s)	Canada
2nd place, silver medalist(s)	Czech Republic
3rd place, bronze medalist(s)	Sweden
4	Germany
5	Italy
5	Scotland
5	Switzerland
5	United States
9	Belgium
10	Norway
11	Denmark
12	Finland
13	Latvia
14	Australia
15	Hungary
16	Ireland
17	New Zealand
18	Turkey
19	England
20	Slovakia
21	Nigeria

== Women ==
=== Teams ===
The teams are listed as follows:

Canada	Czech Republic	Denmark	England	Finland
Skip: Sherry Anderson; Third: Patty Hersikorn; Second: Brenda Goertzen; Lead: Anita Silvernagle; Alternate: Denise Hersikorn	Fourth: Katerina Zapletalová; Skip: Ivana Bartáková; Second: Helena Kramska; Lead: Hana Velova; Alternate: Zuzana Sommerová	Fourth: Trine Qvist; Third: Anni Gustavussen; Second: Gitte Soelvsten; Skip: Linette Henningsen	Skip: Angela Wilcox; Third: Judith Dixon; Second: Helen Forbes; Lead: Deborah Higgins; Alternate: Joan Reed	Skip: Elina Virtaala; Third: Janina Lindström; Second: Tiina Julkunen; Lead: Riikka Louhivuori
Ireland	Italy	Latvia	Lithuania	Scotland
Skip: Dale Sinclair; Third: Louise Kerr; Second: Bernie Gillett; Lead: Clare McCormick	Fourth: Grazia Ferrero; Skip: Lucilla Macchiati; Second: Daniela Faure-Rolland; Lead: Monica Rossetto; Alternate: Cristina Durando	Skip: Gunte Millere; Third: Dace Zīle; Second: Elēna Kāpostiņa; Lead: Inga Apmane	Fourth: Rasa Veronika Jasaitienė; Skip: Gaiva Valatkienė; Second: Jolanta Šulinskienė; Lead: Eglė Čepulytė	Fourth: Mairi Milne; Skip: Edith Hazard; Second: Wendy Johnston; Lead: Katie Loudon; Alternate: Jackie Lockhart
Sweden	Switzerland	United States		
Fourth: Camilla Noréen; Skip: Helena Klange; Second: Helene Lyxell; Lead: Anna Klange Wikström; Alternate: Monika Wranå	Skip: Cristina Lestander; Third: Sandra Born; Second: Silvia Gygax; Lead: Christina Gartenmann; Alternate: Karin Durtschi	Skip: Margie Smith; Third: Ann Swisshelm; Second: Shelly Kosal; Lead: Shelley Dropkin		

=== Round-robin standings ===
Final round-robin standings

Key
Teams to Playoffs

Group A	Skip	W	L	W–L	DSC
Scotland	Edith Hazard	6	0	–	85.89
Canada	Sherry Anderson	5	1	–	99.77
Ireland	Dale Sinclair	4	2	–	104.00
Sweden	Helena Klange	3	3	–	53.56
Czech Republic	Ivana Bartáková	1	5	1–1	86.36
Italy	Lucilla Macchiati	1	5	1–1	103.52
Denmark	Linette Henningsen	1	5	1–1	148.33

Group B	Skip	W	L	W–L	DSC
Finland	Elina Virtaala	3	2	3–0	125.13
Switzerland	Cristina Lestander	3	2	1–2	109.99
United States	Margie Smith	3	2	1–2	111.72
Latvia	Gunte Millere	3	2	1–2	161.29
England	Angela Wilcox	2	3	–	104.03
Lithuania	Gaiva Valatkienė	1	4	–	106.91

Group A Round Robin Summary Table
Pos.	Country	Canada	Czech Republic	Denmark		Italy	Scotland	Sweden	Record
2	Canada	—	10–1	9–2	7–6	10–2	2–8	8–4	5–1
5	Czech Republic	1–10	—	5–6	4–8	5–4	4–5	4–6	1–5
7	Denmark	2–9	6–5	—	1–14	7–9	2–11	4–8	1–5
3	Ireland	6–7	8–4	14–1	—	13–0	2–10	7–3	4–2
6	Italy	2–10	4–5	9–7	0–13	—	5–9	1–9	1–5
1	Scotland	8–2	5–4	11–2	10–2	9–5	—	7–3	6–0
4	Sweden	4–8	6–4	8–4	3–7	9–1	3–7	—	3–3

Group B Round Robin Summary Table
Pos.	Country	England	Finland	Latvia	Lithuania	Switzerland	United States	Record
5	England	—	6–5	3–5	7–2	2–7	4–11	2–3
1	Finland	5–6	—	10–4	7–9	7–5	8–4	3–2
4	Latvia	5–3	4–10	—	9–3	10–9	5–12	3–2
6	Lithuania	2–7	9–7	3–9	—	2–12	4–9	1–4
2	Switzerland	7–2	5–7	9–10	12–2	—	6–5	3–2
3	United States	11–4	4–8	12–5	9–4	5–6	—	3–2

=== Round-robin results ===
All draw times are listed in Central European Summer Time (UTC+02:00).

==== Draw 1 ====
Saturday, April 23, 8:00

Sheet E	1	2	3	4	5	6	7	8	Final
Canada (Anderson)	0	1	0	0	0	1	0	X	2
Scotland (Hazard) 🔨	1	0	1	1	1	0	4	X	8

==== Draw 2 ====
Saturday, April 23, 12:00

Sheet F	1	2	3	4	5	6	7	8	Final
Denmark (Henningsen) 🔨	1	0	0	2	1	1	0	1	6
Czech Republic (Bartáková)	0	2	1	0	0	0	2	0	5

==== Draw 3 ====
Saturday, April 23, 16:00

Sheet C	1	2	3	4	5	6	7	8	Final
Sweden (Klange)	0	0	0	2	1	0	0	0	3
Ireland (Sinclair) 🔨	1	1	0	0	0	2	1	2	7

Sheet D	1	2	3	4	5	6	7	8	Final
United States (Smith)	0	3	2	1	0	5	0	X	11
England (Wilcox) 🔨	1	0	0	0	1	0	2	X	4

==== Draw 4 ====
Saturday, April 23, 20:00

Sheet B	1	2	3	4	5	6	7	8	Final
Czech Republic (Bartáková) 🔨	0	0	0	0	3	0	1	1	5
Italy (Macchiati)	1	0	1	0	0	2	0	0	4

Sheet C	1	2	3	4	5	6	7	8	9	Final
Lithuania (Valatkienė) 🔨	1	0	0	2	2	0	2	0	2	9
Finland (Virtaala)	0	2	1	0	0	1	0	3	0	7

Sheet D	1	2	3	4	5	6	7	8	Final
Latvia (Millere)	1	0	0	4	0	3	0	2	10
Switzerland (Lestander) 🔨	0	4	0	0	1	0	4	0	9

==== Draw 6 ====
Sunday, April 24, 14:00

Sheet B	1	2	3	4	5	6	7	8	Final
Scotland (Hazard) 🔨	0	1	0	2	4	3	X	X	10
Ireland (Sinclair)	0	0	2	0	0	0	X	X	2

Sheet C	1	2	3	4	5	6	7	8	Final
Italy (Macchiati)	0	0	0	1	0	0	X	X	1
Sweden (Klange) 🔨	1	2	1	0	3	2	X	X	9

==== Draw 7 ====
Sunday, April 24, 19:00

Sheet B	1	2	3	4	5	6	7	8	Final
Canada (Anderson) 🔨	0	2	0	3	2	2	X	X	9
Denmark (Henningsen)	1	0	1	0	0	0	X	X	2

==== Draw 9 ====
Monday, April 25, 12:00

Sheet B	1	2	3	4	5	6	7	8	Final
Switzerland (Lestander) 🔨	4	2	1	4	1	0	0	X	12
Lithuania (Valatkienė)	0	0	0	0	0	1	1	X	2

Sheet C	1	2	3	4	5	6	7	8	Final
England (Wilcox) 🔨	0	1	1	0	1	0	0	0	3
Latvia (Millere)	1	0	0	1	0	1	1	1	5

Sheet D	1	2	3	4	5	6	7	8	Final
Ireland (Sinclair) 🔨	4	3	1	4	0	2	X	X	14
Denmark (Henningsen)	0	0	0	0	1	0	X	X	1

Sheet E	1	2	3	4	5	6	7	8	Final
Finland (Virtaala) 🔨	0	1	0	2	0	4	1	X	8
United States (Smith)	1	0	1	0	2	0	0	X	4

==== Draw 11 ====
Monday, April 25, 20:00

Sheet D	1	2	3	4	5	6	7	8	Final
Italy (Macchiati) 🔨	0	0	0	3	0	0	2	X	5
Scotland (Hazard)	1	1	1	0	2	4	0	X	9

Sheet E	1	2	3	4	5	6	7	8	Final
Czech Republic (Bartáková)	0	0	1	0	2	0	1	0	4
Sweden (Klange) 🔨	1	1	0	1	0	1	0	2	6

Sheet F	1	2	3	4	5	6	7	8	Final
Canada (Anderson) 🔨	2	0	2	0	1	1	0	1	7
Ireland (Sinclair)	0	3	0	2	0	0	1	0	6

==== Draw 12 ====
Tuesday, April 26, 8:00

Sheet C	1	2	3	4	5	6	7	8	Final
Switzerland (Lestander) 🔨	0	0	3	1	0	0	0	2	6
United States (Smith)	1	1	0	0	1	1	1	0	5

Sheet F	1	2	3	4	5	6	7	8	Final
Latvia (Millere)	1	2	4	2	0	0	0	X	9
Lithuania (Valatkienė) 🔨	0	0	0	0	1	1	1	X	3

==== Draw 13 ====
Tuesday, April 26, 12:00

Sheet E	1	2	3	4	5	6	7	8	Final
Sweden (Klange)	2	0	2	0	0	0	0	X	4
Canada (Anderson) 🔨	0	2	0	1	1	2	2	X	8

Sheet F	1	2	3	4	5	6	7	8	Final
Finland (Virtaala)	0	3	1	0	0	0	1	0	5
England (Wilcox) 🔨	1	0	0	1	1	2	0	1	6

==== Draw 14 ====
Tuesday, April 26, 16:00

Sheet D	1	2	3	4	5	6	7	8	Final
Scotland (Hazard)	0	1	1	0	0	1	0	2	5
Czech Republic (Bartáková) 🔨	1	0	0	1	1	0	1	0	4

Sheet E	1	2	3	4	5	6	7	8	9	Final
Denmark (Henningsen)	1	0	0	2	0	1	3	0	0	7
Italy (Macchiati) 🔨	0	4	1	0	1	0	0	1	2	9

==== Draw 16 ====
Wednesday, April 27, 8:00

Sheet B	1	2	3	4	5	6	7	8	Final
Latvia (Millere)	2	0	2	0	0	0	0	X	4
Finland (Virtaala) 🔨	0	3	0	1	2	3	1	X	10

Sheet C	1	2	3	4	5	6	7	8	Final
Scotland (Hazard) 🔨	3	0	4	0	3	1	X	X	11
Denmark (Henningsen)	0	1	0	1	0	0	X	X	2

Sheet F	1	2	3	4	5	6	7	8	Final
Ireland (Sinclair) 🔨	1	2	2	3	4	1	X	X	13
Italy (Macchiati)	0	0	0	0	0	0	X	X	0

==== Draw 17 ====
Wednesday, April 27, 12:00

Sheet B	1	2	3	4	5	6	7	8	Final
Lithuania (Valatkienė)	0	2	0	1	0	1	0	X	4
United States (Smith) 🔨	3	0	2	0	2	0	2	X	9

==== Draw 18 ====
Wednesday, April 27, 16:00

Sheet C	1	2	3	4	5	6	7	8	Final
Czech Republic (Bartáková)	1	0	0	0	0	0	X	X	1
Canada (Anderson) 🔨	0	2	2	2	3	1	X	X	10

Sheet E	1	2	3	4	5	6	7	8	Final
England (Wilcox)	0	1	0	0	0	1	X	X	2
Switzerland (Lestander) 🔨	1	0	3	1	2	0	X	X	7

==== Draw 20 ====
Thursday, April 28, 8:00

Sheet B	1	2	3	4	5	6	7	8	Final
Denmark (Henningsen)	0	1	0	0	2	0	1	X	4
Sweden (Klange) 🔨	4	0	2	1	0	1	0	X	8

Sheet C	1	2	3	4	5	6	7	8	Final
Finland (Virtaala) 🔨	1	2	1	0	1	2	0	X	7
Switzerland (Lestander)	0	0	0	4	0	0	1	X	5

Sheet D	1	2	3	4	5	6	7	8	Final
England (Wilcox)	1	0	2	0	1	1	2	X	7
Lithuania (Valatkienė) 🔨	0	1	0	1	0	0	0	X	2

Sheet E	1	2	3	4	5	6	7	8	Final
Ireland (Sinclair)	2	2	0	3	0	1	0	X	8
Czech Republic (Bartáková) 🔨	0	0	1	0	2	0	1	X	4

==== Draw 21 ====
Thursday, April 28, 12:00

Sheet B	1	2	3	4	5	6	7	8	Final
Italy (Macchiati)	0	0	0	1	1	0	X	X	2
Canada (Anderson) 🔨	3	2	1	0	0	4	X	X	10

==== Draw 22 ====
Thursday, April 28, 16:00

Sheet F	1	2	3	4	5	6	7	8	Final
United States (Smith) 🔨	2	0	3	0	2	0	5	X	12
Latvia (Millere)	0	1	0	1	0	3	0	X	5

==== Draw 23 ====
Thursday, April 28, 20:00

Sheet F	1	2	3	4	5	6	7	8	Final
Sweden (Klange) 🔨	1	0	0	1	1	0	0	0	3
Scotland (Hazard)	0	2	0	0	0	2	1	2	7

=== Playoffs ===
Quarterfinals
B2	Switzerland	8
A3	Ireland	5
A2	Canada	3
B3	United States	4

Semifinals
A1	Scotland	6
B2	Switzerland	7
B1	Finland	4
B3	United States	8

Gold medal game
B2	Switzerland	6
B3	United States	5
Third place
A1	Scotland	6
B1	Finland	4

==== Quarterfinals ====
Friday, April 29, 13:00

Sheet B	1	2	3	4	5	6	7	8	Final
Canada (Anderson) 🔨	1	0	0	0	1	0	1	0	3
United States (Smith)	0	1	1	0	0	1	0	1	4

Sheet F	1	2	3	4	5	6	7	8	Final
Switzerland (Lestander) 🔨	2	0	1	0	0	0	3	2	8
Ireland (Sinclair)	0	1	0	2	1	1	0	0	5

==== Semifinals ====
Friday, April 29, 19:00

Sheet B	1	2	3	4	5	6	7	8	9	Final
Scotland (Hazard) 🔨	2	0	0	0	0	2	0	2	0	6
Switzerland (Lestander)	0	0	2	2	1	0	1	0	1	7

Sheet D	1	2	3	4	5	6	7	8	Final
Finland (Virtaala) 🔨	1	0	0	1	1	0	1	0	4
United States (Smith)	0	3	1	0	0	2	0	2	8

==== Bronze medal game ====
Saturday, April 30, 10:30

Sheet E	1	2	3	4	5	6	7	8	Final
Scotland (Hazard)	0	0	2	1	0	1	1	1	6
Finland (Virtaala) 🔨	1	1	0	0	2	0	0	0	4

==== Gold medal game ====
Saturday, April 30, 10:30

Sheet C	1	2	3	4	5	6	7	8	Final
Switzerland (Lestander) 🔨	0	0	1	2	0	1	0	2	6
United States (Smith)	1	1	0	0	0	0	3	0	5

=== Final standings ===
Place	Team
1st place, gold medalist(s)	Switzerland
2nd place, silver medalist(s)	United States
3rd place, bronze medalist(s)	Scotland
4	Finland
5	Canada
5	Ireland
7	Sweden
8	Latvia
9	Czech Republic
10	England
11	Italy
12	Lithuania
13	Denmark
