= Mait Bjurström =

Swedish female curler

- Curler ♀
- Born: 1 September 1963 (age 63)

Team
- Curling club: Falu CC, Falun

Curling career
- Member Association: Sweden
- World Championship: 1 (1983)
Medal record
Curling
Swedish Women's Championship
Gold medal – first place	1983

Mait Katarina Bjurström (born 1 September 1963) is a Swedish curler. She is a 1983 Swedish women's champion.

== Teams ==
Season	Skip	Third	Second	Lead	Events
1982–83	Anneli Burman	Brita Lindholm	Mait Bjurström	Katarina Lässker	SWCC 1983 (gold); WCC 1983 (4th)
