= Liv Grøseth =

Swiss female curler

- Curler ♀

Team
- Curling club: Trondheim CC. Trondheim

Curling career
- Member Association: Norway
- World Championship: 1 (1983)
Medal record
Curling
World Championships
| Silver medal – second place | 1983 Moose Jaw |
Norwegian Women's Championship
| Gold medal – first place | 1983 |

Liv Grøseth is a former Norwegian curler.

She is a 1983 World women's silver medallist.

== Teams ==
| Season | Skip | Third | Second | Lead | Events |
|---|---|---|---|---|---|
| 1982–83 | Eva Vanvik | Åse Vanvik | Alvhild Fugelmo | Liv Grøseth | NWCC 1983 (gold); WCC 1983 (silver) |
