= Daniel Gutknecht =

Swiss male curler

- Curler ♂

Team
- Curling club: Lausanne-Olympique CC, Lausanne

Curling career
- Member Association: Switzerland
- World Championship: 1 (1996)
- Other appearances: World Junior Championships: 1 (1984)
Medal record
Curling
World Championships
Bronze medal – third place	1996 Hamilton
Swiss Men's Championship
Gold medal – first place	1996 Arlesheim
World Junior Championships
Silver medal – second place	1984 Cornwall

Daniel Gutknecht (born c. 1963) is a Swiss curler.

He is a 1996 World Men's bronze medallist and a Swiss men's champion (1996).

At the time of the 1996 Worlds, he was employed as an engineer.

== Teams ==
Season	Skip	Third	Second	Lead	Alternate	Events
1982–83	André Flotron	Andreas Hänni	Daniel Gutknecht	André Szodoray		SJCC 1983 (gold)
1983–84	André Flotron	Andreas Hänni	Daniel Gutknecht	André Szodoray		WJCC 1984 (silver)
1995–96	Patrick Hürlimann	Patrik Lörtscher	Daniel Gutknecht	Diego Perren	Stephan Keiser	SMCC 1996 (gold); WCC 1996 (bronze)
