= Hazel Erskine =

Scottish curler

- Curler ♀
- Born: Hazel McGregor

Team
- Curling club: Airleywight Ladies CC, Perth

Curling career
- Member Association: Scotland
- World Championship: 1 (1983)
- European Championship: 4 (1988, 1990, 1991, 1992)
Medal record
Curling
European Championships
Silver medal – second place	1988 Perth
Silver medal – second place	1990 Lillehammer
Silver medal – second place	1995 Grindelwald
Scottish Women's Championship
Gold medal – first place	1983
Bronze medal – third place	1986

Hazel Erskine (née McGregor) is a Scottish curler.

At the international level, she is a three-time silver medallist at the European Championships.

At the national level, she is a 1983 Scottish women's champion curler.

== Teams ==
Season	Skip	Third	Second	Lead	Events
1982–83	Hazel McGregor	Jane Ramsey	Betty McGregor	Billie-May Muirhead	SWCC 1983 (gold); WWCC 1983 (6th)
1985–86	Hazel McGregor	Edith Loudon	Fiona McFarlane	Linda Milne	SWCC 1986 (bronze)
1987–88	Hazel McGregor	Edith Loudon	Fiona Bayne	Katie Loudon	
1988–89	Hazel McGregor	Edith Loudon	Fiona Bayne	Katie Loudon	ECC 1988 (silver)
1990–91	Hazel Erskine	Edith Loudon	Katie Loudon	Fiona Bayne	ECC 1990 (silver)
1991–92	Hazel Erskine	Edith Loudon	Katie Loudon	Fiona Bayne	ECC 1991 (5th)
1992–93	Kirsty Hay	Hazel Erskine	Joanna Pegg	Louise Wilkie	ECC 1992 (silver)
