= Russell Keiller =

Scottish male curler and coach

- Curler ♂

Team
- Curling club: St Martins CC

Curling career
- Member Association: Scotland
- World Championship: 2 (1984, 1995)
- European Championship: 2 (1982, 1983)
- Other appearances: World Junior Championships: 2 (1983, 1984)
Medal record
Curling
World Championship
Silver medal – second place	1995 Brandon
European Championships
Gold medal – first place	1982 Kirkcaldy
Bronze medal – third place	1983 Västerås
World Junior Championships
Bronze medal – third place	1983 Medicine Hat
Bronze medal – third place	1984 Cornwall
Scottish Men's Championship
Gold medal – first place	1984
Gold medal – first place	1995

Russell Keiller is a Scottish curler and curling coach. He is a 1982 European champion and a 1995 World Men's silver medallist. He participated at the 2006 Winter Olympics as a coach of Great Britain women team.

Russell Keiller was appointed by the Board of Directors of British Curling in August 2014.

== Teams ==
=== Men's ===
Season	Skip	Third	Second	Lead	Alternate	Events
1982–83	Mike Hay	David Hay	David Smith	Russell Keiller		ECC 1982 (gold); SJCC 1983 (gold); WJCC 1983 (bronze)
1983–84	Mike Hay	David Hay	David Smith	Russell Keiller	Gordon Sneddon (WCC)	ECC 1983 (bronze); SMCC 1984 (gold); WCC 1984 (7th)
1983–84	Mike Hay	David Smith	Gregor Smith	Russell Keiller		SJCC 1984 (gold); WJCC 1984 (bronze)
1994–95	Gordon Muirhead	Peter Loudon	Robert Kelly	Russell Keiller	Graeme Connal	SMCC 1995 (gold); WCC 1995 (silver)
1996–97	Gordon Muirhead	Peter Loudon	Robert Kelly	Russell Keiller		

=== Mixed ===
Season	Skip	Third	Second	Lead	Events
1995	Peter Loudon	Edith Loudon	Russell Keiller	Katie Loudon	SMxCC 1995 (silver)

== Record as a coach of national teams ==
Year	Tournament, event	National team	Place
1994	1994 European Curling Championships	Scotland (women)	4
1998	1998 European Curling Championships	Scotland (women)	2nd place, silver medalist(s)
1999	1999 European Curling Championships	Scotland (women)	4
2000	2000 World Women's Curling Championship	Scotland (women)	4
2001	2001 European Curling Championships	Scotland (women)	6
2005	2005 European Curling Championships	Scotland (women)	5
2006	2006 Winter Olympics	United Kingdom (women)	5
