= Edith Hazard =

Scottish curler (born 1964)

- Curler ♀
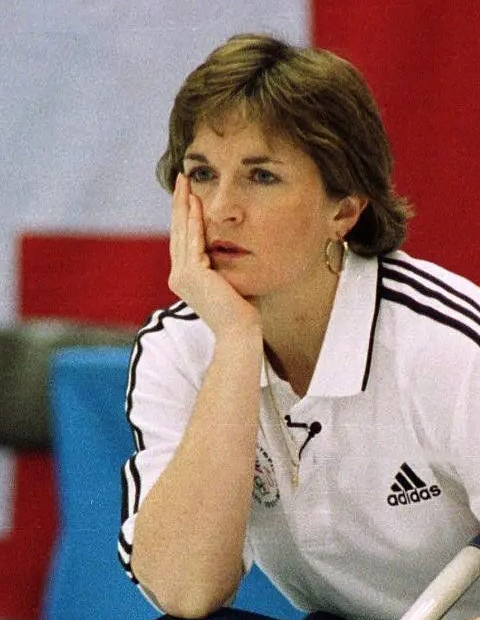
- Born: Edith Loudon; 15 February 1964 (age 62); Perth, Scotland

Team
- Curling club: Airleywight Ladies CC, Perth
- Skip: Jackie Lockhart
- Third: Mairi Milne
- Second: Wendy Johnston
- Lead: Katie Loudon
- Alternate: Edith Hazard

Curling career
- Member Association: Scotland
- World Championship: 6 (1995, 1996, 1998, 2001, 2002, 2003)
- European Championship: 8 (1988, 1990, 1991, 1994, 1995, 1997, 2002, 2003)
- Olympic: 1 (1998)
Medal record
Curling
Representing Scotland
World Championships
Gold medal – first place	2002 Bismarck
World Senior Championships
Silver medal – second place	2023 Gangneung
Bronze medal – third place	2022 Geneva
European Championships
Silver medal – second place	1988 Perth
Silver medal – second place	1990 Lillehammer
Silver medal – second place	1995 Grindelwald
Scottish Women's Championship
Gold medal – first place	1995
Gold medal – first place	1996
Gold medal – first place	1998
Gold medal – first place	2003
Bronze medal – third place	1986

Edith Hazard (née Loudon; born 15 February 1964 in Perth, Scotland) is a Scottish curler, a 2002 World champion.

She played for Great Britain at the 1998 Winter Olympics.

She was a member of an expert group in the World Curling Federation, who explained what kind of curling could be added as a second medal discipline to the Winter Olympics, concluding that it should be mixed doubles curling.

== Teams ==
=== Women's ===
Season	Skip	Third	Second	Lead	Alternate	Coach	Events
1985–86	Hazel McGregor	Edith Loudon	Fiona McFarlane	Linda Milne			SWCC 1986 (bronze)
1987–88	Hazel McGregor	Edith Loudon	Fiona Bayne	Katie Loudon			
1988–89	Hazel McGregor	Edith Loudon	Fiona Bayne	Katie Loudon			ECC 1988 (silver)
1990–91	Hazel Erskine	Edith Loudon	Katie Loudon	Fiona Bayne			ECC 1990 (silver)
1991–92	Hazel Erskine	Edith Loudon	Katie Loudon	Fiona Bayne			ECC 1991 (5th)
1994–95	Kirsty Hay	Edith Loudon	Joanna Pegg	Katie Loudon	Jackie Lockhart (ECC), Claire Milne (WCC)	Peter Loudon	ECC 1994 (6th); SWCC 1995 (gold); WCC 1995 (7th)
1995–96	Kirsty Hay	Edith Loudon	Karen Addison	Katie Loudon	Claire Milne	Peter Loudon	ECC 1995 (silver); SWCC 1996 (gold); WCC 1996 (5th)
1997–98	Kirsty Hay	Edith Loudon	Jackie Lockhart	Katie Loudon	Fiona Bayne	Jane Sanderson	ECC 1997 (6th); SWCC 1998 (gold); WOG 1998 (4th); WCC 1998 (7th)
2000–01	Julia Ewart	Heather Byers	Nancy Murdoch	Lynn Cameron	Edith Loudon	Moray Combe	WCC 2001 (4th)
2001–02	Jackie Lockhart	Sheila Swan	Katriona Fairweather	Anne Laird	Edith Loudon		WCC 2002 (gold)
2002–03	Jackie Lockhart	Sheila Swan	Katriona Fairweather	Anne Laird	Edith Loudon	Isobel Hannen	ECC 2002 (6th)
2002–03	Edith Loudon	Karen Addison	Lynn Cameron	Katie Loudon	Jackie Lockhart (WCC)	Keith Prentice	SWCC 2003 (gold); WCC 2003 (7th)
2003–04	Edith Loudon	Karen Addison	Lynn Cameron	Katie Loudon	Jackie Lockhart	Isobel Hannen	ECC 2003 (4th)
2005–06	Edith Loudon	Mairi Milne	Sheila Swan	Katie Loudon			SWCC 2006 (4th)
2021–22	Mairi Milne	Edith Hazard (skip)	Wendy Johnston	Katie Loudon	Jackie Lockhart		WSCC 2022 (gold)

=== Mixed ===
Season	Skip	Third	Second	Lead	Events
1993	Peter Loudon	Edith Loudon	Alec Torrance Jr.	Katie Loudon	SMxCC 1993 (gold)
1995	Peter Loudon	Edith Loudon	Russell Keiller	Katie Loudon	SMxCC 1995 (silver)
2001	Neil Joss	Edith Loudon	Mark Brass	Karen Addison	SMxCC 2001 (silver)
2002	Neil Joss	Edith Loudon	Graeme Prentice	Karen Addison	SMxCC 2002 (silver)

== Private life ==
Hazard is from a family of curlers: her brother Peter is a World and European champion, her sister Katie was Edith's teammate, playing together at the 1998 Winter Olympics.
