= Bev Birklid =

American curler

- Curler ♀

Team
- Curling club: Fairbanks CC, Fairbanks

Curling career
- Member Association: United States
- World Championship: 1 (1985)
Medal record
Curling
Representing Alaska
United States Women's Championship
Gold medal – first place	1985 Hershey

Bev Birklid is an American curler.

At the national level, she is a United States women's champion curler (1985).

== Teams ==
=== Women's ===
Season	Skip	Third	Second	Lead	Events
1984–85	Bev Birklid	Peggy Martin	Jerry Evans	Katrina Sharp	1985 USWCC (gold); 1985 WWCC (9th)

=== Mixed ===
Season	Skip	Third	Second	Lead	Events
1980–81	Bill Birklid	Bev Birklid	Buzz Jackovich	Iris Jackovich	
