= Andreas Hänni (curler) =

Swiss male curler

- Curler ♂

Team
- Curling club: Lausanne-Olympique CC, Lausanne

Curling career
- Member Association: Switzerland
- World Championship: 1 (1989)
- Other appearances: World Junior Championships: 1 (1984)
Medal record
Curling
World Championships
Silver medal – second place	1989 Milwaukee
Swiss Men's Championship
Gold medal – first place	1989 Engelberg
World Junior Championships
Silver medal – second place	1984 Cornwall

Andreas Hänni is a Swiss curler.

He is a 1989 World Men's silver medallist and a two-time Swiss men's champion (1989, 2006).

== Teams ==
Season	Skip	Third	Second	Lead	Alternate	Events
1982–83	André Flotron	Andreas Hänni	Daniel Gutknecht	André Szodoray		SJCC 1983 (gold)
1983–84	André Flotron	Andreas Hänni	Daniel Gutknecht	André Szodoray		WJCC 1984 (silver)
1988–89	Patrick Hürlimann	Andreas Hänni	Patrik Lörtscher	Mario Gross		SMCC 1989 (gold); WMCC 1989 (silver)
1996–97	Andreas Hänni	Beat A. Stephan	Thomas Lips	Stefan Gertsch		
1998–99	Andreas Hänni	Beat A. Stephan	Daniel Hersche	Thomas Perlmutter		
2003–04	Yannick Renggli	Andreas Hänni	Greg Renggli	Nicolas Carrera		
2004–05	Yannick Renggli	Andreas Hänni	Damian Grichting	Greg Renggli		
2005–06	Andreas Schwaller	Andreas Hänni	Thomas Lips	Damian Grichting		SMCC 2006 (gold)
2006–07	Andreas Schwaller	Andreas Hänni	Thomas Lips	Damian Grichting	Roland Moser	
2007–08	Claudio Pescia	Andreas Hänni	Pascal Sieber	Marco Battilana	Mario Freiberger	
