= Brita Lindholm =

Swedish curler

- Curler ♀
- Born: 12 December 1963 (age 62)

Team
- Curling club: Falu CC, Falun

Curling career
- Member Association: Sweden
- World Championship: 1 (1983)
Medal record
Curling
Swedish Women's Championship
Gold medal – first place	1983

Brita Lindholm (born 12 December 1963) is a Swedish curler. She was the 1983 Swedish women's champion.

== Teams ==
Season	Skip	Third	Second	Lead	Events
1982–83	Anneli Burman	Brita Lindholm	Mait Bjurström	Katarina Lässker	SWCC 1983 (gold); WCC 1983 (4th)
