= Stephen Watt (curler) =

English male curler

- Curler ♂

Team
- Curling club: Wigan & Haigh CC, Wigan

Curling career
- Member Association: England
- World Championship: 3 (1992, 1995, 1996)
- European Championship: 6 (1990, 1991, 1992, 1993, 1994, 1995)

Stephen Watt is an English male curler.

At the national level, he is a six-time English men's champion curler (1990, 1991, 1992, 1993, 1994, 1995).

== Teams ==
Season	Skip	Third	Second	Lead	Alternate	Coach	Events
1990–91	Martyn Deakin (fourth)	Alistair Burns	John Deakin (skip)	Stephen Watt			ECC 1990 (4th)
1991–92	Alistair Burns	John Deakin	Neil Hardie	Stephen Watt			ECC 1991 (9th)
1991–92	Alistair Burns	Neil Hardie	Martyn Deakin	Stephen Watt	Ian Coutts		WCC 1992 (8th)
1992–93	Alistair Burns	Neil Hardie	Phil Atherton	Stephen Watt			ECC 1992 (7th)
1993–94	Phil Atherton	Neil Hardie	Harvey Curle	Stephen Watt			ECC 1993 (10th)
1994–95	Alistair Burns	Andrew Hemming	Neil Hardie	Phil Atherton	Stephen Watt		ECC 1994 (6th)
1994–95	Alistair Burns	Andrew Hemming	Neil Hardie	Stephen Watt	Phil Atherton	Stephen Hinds	WCC 1995 (9th)
1995–96	Alistair Burns	Alan MacDougall	Andrew Hemming	Neil Hardie	Stephen Watt		ECC 1995 (6th)
1995–96	Alistair Burns	Andrew Hemming	Neil Hardie	Stephen Watt	Phil Atherton	Stephen Hinds	WCC 1996 (6th)
1996–97	Alistair Burns	Neil Hardie	C Hastings	Stephen Watt			
