= 1996 World Men's Curling Championship =

1996 World Men's Curling Championships
- Host city: Hamilton, Ontario, Canada
- Arena: Copps Coliseum
- Dates: March 23–31, 1996
- Winner: Canada
- Curling club: Charleswood CC, Winnipeg, Manitoba
- Skip: Jeff Stoughton
- Third: Ken Tresoor
- Second: Garry Vandenberghe
- Lead: Steve Gould
- Alternate: Darryl Gunnlaugson
- Finalist: Scotland (Warwick Smith)

The 1996 World Men's Curling Championship (branded as 1996 Ford World Men's Curling Championship for sponsorship reasons) was held at Copps Coliseum in Hamilton, Ontario, Canada from March 23–31, 1996.

== Teams ==
Australia	Canada	England	Germany
Sydney Harbour CC, Sydney Skip: Hugh Millikin; Third: Stephen Johns; Second: Gerald Chick; Lead: Andy Campbell; Alternate: Stephen Hewitt	Charleswood CC, Winnipeg Skip: Jeff Stoughton; Third: Ken Tresoor; Second: Garry Vandenberghe; Lead: Steve Gould; Alternate: Darryl Gunnlaugson	Wigan CC, Wigan; Haigh CC, Wigan Skip: Alistair Burns; Third: Andrew Hemming; Second: Neil Hardie; Lead: Stephen Watt; Alternate: Phil Atherton	CC Hamburg Skip: Johnny Jahr; Third: Sven Goldemann; Second: Andreas Feldenkirchen; Lead: Till Thomsen; Alternate: Dirk Hornung
Italy	Norway	Scotland	Sweden
Auros, Auronzo Skip: Claudio Pescia; Third: Gian Paolo Zandegiacomo; Second: Valter Bombassei; Lead: Diego Bombassei; Alternate: Davide Zandiegiacomo	Snarøen CC, Oslo Skip: Eigil Ramsfjell; Third: Anthon Grimsmo; Second: Jan Thoresen; Lead: Tore Torvbråten; Alternate: Sjur Loen	Airleywight CC, Perth Skip: Warwick Smith; Third: David Smith; Second: Peter Smith; Lead: David Hay; Alternate: Richard Dickson	Sollefteå CK Skip: Mikael Hasselborg; Third: Stefan Hasselborg; Second: Hans Nordin; Lead: Peter Eriksson; Alternate: Lars-Åke Nordström
Switzerland	United States		
Lausanne-Olympique CC Skip: Patrick Hürlimann; Third: Patrik Lörtscher; Second: Daniel Gutknecht; Lead: Diego Perren; Alternate: Stephan Keiser	Superior CC, Wisconsin Skip: Tim Somerville; Third: Mike Schneeberger; Second: Myles Brundidge; Lead: John Gordon; Alternate: Donald Barcome Jr.		

== Round-robin standings ==
Key
Teams to playoffs
Teams to tiebreakers

Country	Skip	W	L
Canada	Jeff Stoughton	8	1
Scotland	Warwick Smith	7	2
Switzerland	Patrick Hürlimann	6	3
Norway	Eigil Ramsfjell	4	5
Sweden	Mikael Hasselborg	4	5
England	Alistair Burns	4	5
United States	Tim Somerville	4	5
Italy	Claudio Pescia	3	6
Germany	Johnny Jahr	3	6
Australia	Hugh Millikin	2	7

== Round-robin results ==
=== Draw 1 ===
Sheet A	Final
Sweden (Hasselborg)	5
Norway (Ramsfjell)	8

Sheet B	Final
Switzerland (Hürlimann)	4
Scotland (Smith)	6

Sheet C	Final
Germany (Jahr)	7
Italy (Pescia)	8

Sheet D	Final
England (Burns)	9
Australia (Millikin)	2

Sheet E	Final
United States (Somerville)	7
Canada (Stoughton)	9

=== Draw 2 ===
Sheet A	Final
Australia (Millikin)	6
Scotland (Smith)	9

Sheet B	Final
Canada (Stoughton)	8
Germany (Jahr)	4

Sheet C	Final
Sweden (Hasselborg)	2
Switzerland (Hürlimann)	5

Sheet D	Final
Italy (Pescia)	8
United States (Somerville)	10

Sheet E	Final
Norway (Ramsfjell)	6
England (Burns)	5

=== Draw 3 ===
Sheet A	Final
Germany (Jahr)	10
Sweden (Hasselborg)	3

Sheet B	Final
Italy (Pescia)	8
England (Burns)	6

Sheet C	Final
Scotland (Smith)	1
United States (Somerville)	10

Sheet D	Final
Canada (Stoughton)	6
Norway (Ramsfjell)	5

Sheet E	Final
Switzerland (Hürlimann)	12
Australia (Millikin)	5

=== Draw 4 ===
Sheet A	Final
Norway (Ramsfjell)	6
Switzerland (Hürlimann)	7

Sheet B	Final
United States (Somerville)	5
Sweden (Hasselborg)	8

Sheet C	Final
Australia (Millikin)	5
Canada (Stoughton)	11

Sheet D	Final
Scotland (Smith)	10
Italy (Pescia)	5

Sheet E	Final
England (Burns)	8
Germany (Jahr)	6

=== Draw 5 ===
Sheet A	Final
Italy (Pescia)	5
Canada (Stoughton)	7

Sheet B	Final
England (Burns)	7
Switzerland (Hürlimann)	6

Sheet C	Final
United States (Somerville)	7
Germany (Jahr)	9

Sheet D	Final
Australia (Millikin)	2
Sweden (Hasselborg)	7

Sheet E	Final
Scotland (Smith)	9
Norway (Ramsfjell)	6

=== Draw 6 ===
Sheet A	Final
United States (Somerville)	10
Australia (Millikin)	3

Sheet B	Final
Scotland (Smith)	3
Canada (Stoughton)	4

Sheet C	Final
England (Burns)	8
Sweden (Hasselborg)	11

Sheet D	Final
Norway (Ramsfjell)	7
Germany (Jahr)	5

Sheet E	Final
Italy (Pescia)	8
Switzerland (Hürlimann)	9

=== Draw 7 ===
Sheet A	Final
Scotland (Smith)	6
England (Burns)	4

Sheet B	Final
Germany (Jahr)	4
Australia (Millikin)	10

Sheet C	Final
Italy (Pescia)	1
Norway (Ramsfjell)	9

Sheet D	Final
United States (Somerville)	4
Switzerland (Hürlimann)	6

Sheet E	Final
Canada (Stoughton)	7
Sweden (Hasselborg)	5

=== Draw 8 ===
Sheet A	Final
Switzerland (Hürlimann)	6
Germany (Jahr)	9

Sheet B	Final
Norway (Ramsfjell)	8
United States (Somerville)	10

Sheet C	Final
Canada (Stoughton)	6
England (Burns)	5

Sheet D	Final
Sweden (Hasselborg)	5
Scotland (Smith)	14

Sheet E	Final
Australia (Millikin)	6
Italy (Pescia)	9

=== Draw 9 ===
Sheet A	Final
England (Burns)	5
United States (Somerville)	4

Sheet B	Final
Sweden (Hasselborg)	8
Italy (Pescia)	6

Sheet C	Final
Norway (Ramsfjell)	6
Australia (Millikin)	9

Sheet D	Final
Switzerland (Hürlimann)	7
Canada (Stoughton)	6

Sheet E	Final
Germany (Jahr)	4
Scotland (Smith)	6

== Tiebreakers ==
=== Round 1 ===
Sheet A	Final
United States (Somerville)	3
Norway (Ramsfjell)	9

Sheet B	Final
Sweden (Hasselborg)	5
England (Burns)	4

=== Round 2 ===
Sheet A	Final
Sweden (Hasselborg)	3
Norway (Ramsfjell)	9

== Playoffs ==
Semi-final
1	Canada	7
4	Norway	1
2	Scotland	5
3	Switzerland	4

Final
1	Canada	6
2	Scotland	2
Bronze medal game
3	Switzerland	9
4	Norway	6

=== Final ===
Team	1	2	3	4	5	6	7	8	9	10	Final
Canada (Stoughton)	0	1	0	0	2	0	2	0	1	X	6
Scotland (Smith)	0	0	1	0	0	1	0	0	0	X	2

1996 Ford World Curling Championship
(Canada)
Canada
24th title
