= 1990 European Curling Championships =

- Host city: Lillehammer, Norway
- Arena: Kristins Hall
- Dates: 4–8 December
- Men's winner: Sweden
- Curling club: Sollefteå CK, Sollefteå
- Skip: Mikael Hasselborg
- Third: Hans Nordin
- Second: Lars Vågberg
- Lead: Stefan Hasselborg
- Finalist: Scotland (Robin Gray)
- Women's winner: Norway
- Curling club: Snarøyen CC, Oslo
- Skip: Dordi Nordby
- Third: Hanne Pettersen
- Second: Mette Halvorsen
- Lead: Anne Jøtun
- Finalist: Scotland (Hazel Erskine)

The 1990 European Curling Championships were held from 4 to 8 December at the Kristins Hall arena in Lillehammer, Norway.

The Swedish men's team won their third title, and the Norwegian women's team won their first title.

Scotland were the losing finalist in both the men's and women's events.

== Men ==
=== Teams ===
| Country | Skip | Third | Second | Lead | Alternate | Curling club, city |
|---|---|---|---|---|---|---|
| Austria | Alois Kreidl | Günther Mochny | Dieter Küchenmeister | Stefan Salinger | | Kitzbühel CC, Kitzbühel |
| Czechoslovakia | Radek Klima | Tomas Klima | Martin Binder | Karel Havl¡cek | | |
| Denmark | Tommy Stjerne | Per Berg | Ivan Frederiksen | Anders Søderblom | Peter Andersen | Hvidovre CC, Hvidovre |
| England | Martyn Deakin (4th) | Alistair Burns | John Deakin (skip) | Stephen Watt | | |
| Finland | Jussi Uusipaavalniemi | Jari Laukkanen | Jori Aro | Marko Poikolainen | Juhani Heinonen | |
| France | Thierry Mercier | Daniel Cosetto | Lionel Tournier | Laurent Flenghi | Joel Indergand | |
| Germany | Rodger Gustaf Schmidt | Philip Seitz | Johnny Jahr | Andreas Feldenkirchen | Dirk Hornung, Joackim Fendske | |
| Italy | Vittorino Boschet | Alessandro Fummi | Livio Zanardo | Giovanni Zadra | | |
| Netherlands | Jerom van Dillegis | Jan Henderson | Rob Joosen | Hans van Dijk | Gerard Köppers | |
| Norway | Eigil Ramsfjell | Sjur Loen | Morten Skaug | Niclas Järund | | Snarøyen CC, Oslo |
| Scotland | Robin Gray | Kenneth Knox | Kerr Graham | William Hogg | | |
| Sweden | Mikael Hasselborg | Hans Nordin | Lars Vågberg | Stefan Hasselborg | | Sollefteå CK, Sollefteå |
| Switzerland | Markus Känzig | Silvano Flückiger | Cristoph Richter | Mario Flückiger | | |
| Wales | John Hunt | John Stone | Scott Lyon) | David Stevenson | | |

=== First Phase (Triple Knockout) ===
==== Round 1 ====
Two teams promoted to Second Phase

| Game 1 | | Game 2 | | Game 3 |
| | | Scotland | 8 |
| Wales | 13 | Wales | 2 |
| Italy | 2 | | | Scotland | 8 |
| France | 6 | | | France | 7 |
| Netherlands | 5 | France | 4 |
| Sweden | 6 | Sweden | 3 |
| England | 5 |

| Game 1 | | Game 2 | | Game 3 |
| | | Norway | 9 |
| Austria | 3 | Austria | 2 |
| Denmark | 2 | | | Norway | 6 |
| Germany | 14 | | | Germany | 3 |
| Czechoslovakia | 1 | Germany | 9 |
| Switzerland | 7 | Switzerland | 5 |
| Finland | 2 |

==== Round 2 ====
Three teams promoted to Second Phase

| Game 1 | | Game 2 | | Game 3 |
| | | | | Germany | 3 |
| | | | | England | 10 |
| | | Italy | 8 |
| Netherlands | 2 | England | 10 |
| England | 10 |

| Game 1 | | Game 2 | | Game 3 |
| | | | | France | 6 |
| | | | | Finland | 7 |
| | | Denmark | 4 |
| Czechoslovakia | 2 | Finland | 5 |
| Finland | 14 |

| Game 1 | | Game 2 |
| | | Sweden | 6 |
| Austria | 2 | Switzerland | 7 |
| Switzerland | 5 |

==== Round 3 ====
Three teams promoted to Second Phase

| Game 1 | | Game 2 |
| | | France | 8 |
| Austria | 4 | Netherlands | 3 |
| Netherlands | 6 |

| Game 1 | | Game 2 |
| | | Sweden | 6 |
| Italy | 3 | Denmark | 3 |
| Denmark | 10 |

| Game 1 | | Game 2 |
| | | Germany | 7 |
| Wales | 11 | Wales | 8 |
| Czechoslovakia | 2 |

=== Second Phase (Double Knockout) ===
==== Round 1 ====
Two teams promoted to Playoffs

Game 1
Scotland | 6
Sweden | 7
Finland | 0
England | 7

Game 2
Sweden | 1
England | 4

Game 1
Norway | 6
France | 2
Switzerland | 6
Wales | 2

Game 2
Norway | 8
Switzerland | 7

==== Round 2 ====
Two teams promoted to Playoffs

| Game 1 | | Game 2 |
| | | Switzerland | 3 |
| Scotland | 6 | Scotland | 6 |
| Finland | 3 |

| Game 1 | | Game 2 |
| | | Sweden | 6 |
| France | 6 | France | 3 |
| Wales | 3 |

=== Placement Phase ===
==== Range 9-14 ====
Quarterfinals (9-14)
Netherlands | 14
Czechoslovakia | 2
Austria | 8
Italy | 6

Semifinals (9-14)
Netherlands | 2
Denmark | 11
Germany | 7
Austria | 2

Final for 9th place
Denmark | 6
Germany | 4

Semifinals (11-14)
Netherlands | 7
Italy | 2
Austria | 13
Czechoslovakia | 3

Final for 11th place
Netherlands | 7
Austria | 3
Match for 13th place
Italy | 11
Czechoslovakia | 3

==== Range 5-8 ====
| Final for 5th place |
| Switzerland | 6 |
| France | 1 |

| Final for 7th place |
| Finland | 6 |
| Wales | 3 |

=== Playoffs ===
Semifinals
England | 4
Scotland | 5
Norway | 4
Sweden | 6

Final
Scotland | 7
Sweden | 9
Bronze Medal Game
England | 5
Norway | 6

=== Final standings ===
| Place | Country | Skip | Games | Wins | Losses |
|---|---|---|---|---|---|
| 1st place, gold medalist(s) | Sweden | Mikael Hasselborg | 10 | 7 | 3 |
| 2nd place, silver medalist(s) | Scotland | Robin Gray | 7 | 5 | 2 |
| 3rd place, bronze medalist(s) | Norway | Eigil Ramsfjell | 6 | 5 | 1 |
| 4 | England | John Deakin | 8 | 5 | 3 |
| 5 | Switzerland | Markus Känzig | 8 | 5 | 3 |
| 6 | France | Thierry Mercier | 9 | 4 | 5 |
| 7 | Finland | Jussi Uusipaavalniemi | 7 | 4 | 3 |
| 8 | Wales | John Hunt | 8 | 3 | 5 |
| 9 | Denmark | Tommy Stjerne | 6 | 3 | 3 |
| 10 | Germany | Rodger Gustaf Schmidt | 7 | 3 | 4 |
| 11 | Netherlands | Jerom van Dillegis | 8 | 4 | 4 |
| 12 | Austria | Alois Kreidl | 8 | 3 | 5 |
| 13 | Italy | Vittorino Boschet | 6 | 1 | 5 |
| 14 | Czechoslovakia | Radek Klima | 6 | 0 | 6 |

== Women ==
=== Teams ===
| Country | Skip | Third | Second | Lead | Alternate Coach | Curling club, city |
|---|---|---|---|---|---|---|
| Austria | Edeltraud Koudelka | Margit Holzer | Anna Egger | Veronika Huber | Lilly Hummelt | |
| Denmark | Helena Blach Lavrsen | Malene Krause | Lone Kristoffersen | Gitte Larsen | | Hvidovre CC, Hvidovre |
| England | Moira Davison | Margaret Martin | Venetia Scott | Joan Reed | Margaret Cadzow | Glendale CC, Northumberland |
| Finland | Jaana Jokela | Terhi Aro | Nina Ahvenainen | Heidi Koskiheimo | Marita Ripatti | |
| France | Karine Caux | Laurence Bibollet | Géraldine Girod | Chrystelle Fournier | | |
| Germany | Andrea Schöpp | Monika Wagner | Christina Haller | Heike Wieländer | Rainer Schöpp | SC Riessersee, Garmisch-Partenkirchen |
| Italy | Ann Lacedelli | Maria Carla Lorenzi | Daniela Zandegiacomo | Loredana Siorpaes | | |
| Netherlands | Jenny Bovenschen | Netty Born | Kniertje van Kuyk | Teuna Jongert | Elke Schütz | |
| Norway | Dordi Nordby | Hanne Pettersen | Mette Halvorsen | Anne Jøtun | | Snarøyen CC, Oslo |
| Scotland | Hazel Erskine | Edith Loudon | Katie Loudon | Fiona Bayne | | |
| Sweden | Annika Lööf | Lotta Giesenfeld | Helena Svensson | Elisabeth Hansson | Lena Mårdberg | |
| Switzerland | Cristina Lestander | Christine Krieg | Nicole Oetliker | Christina Gartenmann | | |
| Wales | Hilary Davis | Jackie Jones | Madzia Williams | Jenny MacMillan | | |

=== First Phase (Triple Knockout) ===
==== Round 1 ====
Two teams promoted to Second Phase.

| Game 1 | | Game 2 | | Game 3 |
| | | Germany | 13 |
| Italy | 3 | Finland | 1 |
| Finland | 10 | | | Germany | 4 |
| Denmark | 8 | | | Norway | 5 |
| England | 1 | Denmark | 3 |
| Norway | 9 | Norway | 9 |
| Austria | 3 |

Game 1
France | 9
Wales | 3
Scotland | 11
Netherlands | 1

Game 2
Switzerland | 8
France | 5
Sweden | 8
Scotland | 7

Game 3
Switzerland | 5
Sweden | 1

==== Round 2 ====
Three teams promoted to Second Phase.

| Game 1 | | Game 2 | | Game 3 |
| | | | | Sweden | 6 |
| | | | | Austria | 2 |
| | | Italy | 3 |
| England | 7 | Austria | 10 |
| Austria | 8 |

Game 1
Wales | 12
Netherlands | 5

Game 2
Germany | 11
Wales | 0
Game 3

Game 1
Finland | 5
Denmark | 4
France | 4
Scotland | 7

Game 2
Finland | 2
Scotland | 8

==== Round 3 ====
Three teams promoted to Second Phase.

Game 1
France | 6
England | 5

Game 2
Wales | 1
France | 6
Game 3

Game 1
Italy | 4
Netherlands | 11

Game 2
Finland | 11
Netherlands | 2
Game 3

| Game 1 |
| Austria | 2 |
| Denmark | 8 |

=== Second Phase (Double Knockout) ===
==== Round 1 ====
Two teams promoted to Playoffs.

Game 1
Norway | 5
Finland | 4
Germany | 7
Sweden | 3

Game 2
Norway | 9
Germany | 4

Game 1
Switzerland | 7
France | 5
Scotland | 5
Denmark | 4

Game 2
Switzerland | 4
Scotland | 7

==== Round 2 ====
Two teams promoted to Playoffs.

Game 1
Finland | 2
Sweden | 9

Game 2
Switzerland | 5
Sweden | 4
Game 3

Game 1
France | 1
Denmark | 10

Game 2
Germany | 5
Denmark | 4
Game 3

=== Placement Phase ===
==== Range 9-13 ====
Quarterfinals (9-13)
England | 5
Italy | 8

Semifinals (9-13)
Wales | 10
Netherlands | 6
Austria | 8
Italy | 6

Final for 9th place
Wales | 3
Austria | 13

| Semifinals (11-13) | | Final for 11th place |
| Netherlands | 8 |
| England | 3 | Netherlands | 5 |
| | | Italy | 10 |

==== Range 5-8 ====
| Final for 5th place |
| Sweden | 2 |
| Denmark | 3 |

| Final for 7th place |
| Finland | 4 |
| France | 2 |

=== Playoffs ===
Semifinals
Norway | 7
Switzerland | 5
Scotland | 6
Germany | 5

Final
Norway | 6
Scotland | 4
Bronze Medal Game
Switzerland | 5
Germany | 3

=== Final standings ===
| Place | Country | Skip | Games | Wins | Losses |
|---|---|---|---|---|---|
| 1st place, gold medalist(s) | Norway | Dordi Nordby | 7 | 7 | 0 |
| 2nd place, silver medalist(s) | Scotland | Hazel Erskine | 8 | 6 | 2 |
| 3rd place, bronze medalist(s) | Switzerland | Cristina Lestander | 7 | 5 | 2 |
| 4 | Germany | Andrea Schöpp | 8 | 4 | 4 |
| 5 | Denmark | Helena Blach Lavrsen | 8 | 4 | 4 |
| 6 | Sweden | Annika Lööf | 7 | 3 | 4 |
| 7 | Finland | Jaana Jokela | 8 | 4 | 4 |
| 8 | France | Karine Caux | 8 | 3 | 5 |
| 9 | Austria | Edeltraud Koudelka | 7 | 4 | 3 |
| 10 | Wales | Hilary Davis | 6 | 2 | 4 |
| 11 | Italy | Ann Lacedelli | 6 | 2 | 4 |
| 12 | Netherlands | Jenny Bovenschen | 7 | 2 | 5 |
| 13 | England | Moira Davison | 5 | 0 | 5 |
