= Phil Atherton =

English male curler

- Curler ♂

Team
- Curling club: Wigan & Haigh CC, Wigan

Curling career
- Member Association: England
- World Championship: 2 (1995, 1996)
- European Championship: 3 (1992, 1993, 1994)

Phil Atherton is an English male curler. He won the English Curling Association's Men's Championship in 1992, 1993, 1994, 1995 and 1998.

== Teams ==
Season	Skip	Third	Second	Lead	Alternate	Coach	Events
1992–93	Alistair Burns	Neil Hardie	Phil Atherton	Stephen Watt			1992 EMCC (7th)
1993–94	Phil Atherton	Neil Hardie	Harvey Curle	Stephen Watt			1993 EMCC (10th)
1994–95	Alistair Burns	Andrew Hemming	Neil Hardie	Phil Atherton	Stephen Watt		1994 EMCC (6th)
1994–95	Alistair Burns	Andrew Hemming	Neil Hardie	Stephen Watt	Phil Atherton	Stephen Hinds	1995 WMCC (9th)
1995–96	Alistair Burns	Andrew Hemming	Neil Hardie	Stephen Watt	Phil Atherton	Stephen Hinds	1996 WMCC (6th)
1997–98	Martyn Deakin	Alan Turner	Phil Atherton	Stephen Hinds	Harvey Curle		
