= Alistair Burns =

English male curler and coach

- Curler ♂
- Born: c. 1964; England

Team
- Curling club: Wigan & Haigh CC, Wigan

Curling career
- Member Association: England
- World Championship: 3 (1992, 1995, 1996)
- European Championship: 5 (1990, 1991, 1992, 1994, 1995)

Alistair Burns is an English male curler and curling coach.

At the national level, he is a six-time English men's champion curler (1990, 1991, 1992, 1993, 1994, 1995).

== Teams ==
| Season | Skip | Third | Second | Lead | Alternate | Coach | Events |
|---|---|---|---|---|---|---|---|
| 1985–86 | Robin Gray | Kenny Knox | Alistair Burns | Neil Hardie | | | |
| 1990–91 | Martyn Deakin (fourth) | Alistair Burns | John Deakin (skip) | Stephen Watt | | | ECC 1990 (4th) |
| 1991–92 | Alistair Burns | John Deakin | Neil Hardie | Stephen Watt | | | ECC 1991 (9th) |
| 1991–92 | Alistair Burns | Neil Hardie | Martyn Deakin | Stephen Watt | Ian Coutts | | WCC 1992 (8th) |
| 1992–93 | Alistair Burns | Neil Hardie | Phil Atherton | Stephen Watt | | | ECC 1992 (7th) |
| 1994–95 | Alistair Burns | Andrew Hemming | Neil Hardie | Phil Atherton | Stephen Watt | | ECC 1994 (6th) |
| 1994–95 | Alistair Burns | Andrew Hemming | Neil Hardie | Stephen Watt | Phil Atherton | Stephen Hinds | WCC 1995 (9th) |
| 1995–96 | Alistair Burns | Alan MacDougall | Andrew Hemming | Neil Hardie | Stephen Watt | | ECC 1995 (6th) |
| 1995–96 | Alistair Burns | Andrew Hemming | Neil Hardie | Stephen Watt | Phil Atherton | Stephen Hinds | WCC 1996 (6th) |
| 1996–97 | Alistair Burns | Neil Hardie | C Hastings | Stephen Watt | | | |

== Record as a coach of national teams ==
| Year | Tournament, event | National team | Place |
|---|---|---|---|
| 2008 | 2008 European Curling Championships | England (women) | 8 |

== Personal life ==
As of 1996, he was living in south Manchester and was employed as a financial consultant.
