= Andrew Hemming =

English male curler and coach

- Curler ♂

Team
- Curling club: Wigan & Haigh CC, Wigan

Curling career
- Member Association: England; Scotland
- World Championship: 2 (1995, 1996)
- European Championship: 2 (1994, 1995)
- Other appearances: World Senior Championships: 1 (2017)

Andrew Hemming (born c. 1962) is an English male curler and curling coach.

At the national level, he is a two-time English men's champion curler (1994, 1995).

At the time of the 1996 Worlds, he was a financial controller.

== Teams ==
Season	Skip	Third	Second	Lead	Alternate	Coach	Events
1994–95	Alistair Burns	Andrew Hemming	Neil Hardie	Phil Atherton	Stephen Watt		ECC 1994 (6th)
1994–95	Alistair Burns	Andrew Hemming	Neil Hardie	Stephen Watt	Phil Atherton	Stephen Hinds	WCC 1995 (9th)
1995–96	Alistair Burns	Alan MacDougall	Andrew Hemming	Neil Hardie	Stephen Watt		ECC 1995 (6th)
1995–96	Alistair Burns	Andrew Hemming	Neil Hardie	Stephen Watt	Phil Atherton	Stephen Hinds	WCC 1996 (6th)
2016–17	Ian Drysdale	David McQueen	Ronnie Wilson	Graham Lindsay	Andrew Hemming	Andrew Hemming	WSCC 2017 (10th)

== Record as a coach of national teams ==
Year	Tournament, event	National team	Place
2017	2017 World Senior Curling Championships	Scotland (senior men)	10
