= Peter Loudon =

Scottish curler (born 1966)

Personal information
- Born: 17 November 1966 (age 59) Perth, Scotland

Sport
- Sport: Curling
- Club: Airleywight CC
Medal record
Men's curling
Representing Scotland
World Championships
Gold medal – first place	1999 Saint John	Team
Silver medal – second place	1995 Brandon	Team
Silver medal – second place	2008 Grand Forks	Team
Bronze medal – third place	1997 Berne	Team
Bronze medal – third place	2002 Bismarck	Team
European Championships
Gold medal – first place	1996 Copenhagen	Team
Gold medal – first place	1999 Chamonix	Team
Gold medal – first place	2007 Füssen	Team

Peter Loudon (born 17 November 1966 in Perth, Scotland) is a Scottish curler and world champion. He is the alternate player on the David Murdoch team.

He won a gold medal (with skip Hammy McMillan) at the 1999 Ford World Curling Championships in Saint John, New Brunswick. He has received three gold medals at the European Curling Championships.

Loudon competed for Great Britain at the 2002 Winter Olympics.

Loudon is on the board of directors at Scottish football club St Johnstone, for whom his grandfather, Peter Gavigan, played during the 1920s.

He is a brother of Edith Loudon and Katie Loudon.
