= Erika Müller =

Swiss curler and coach

- Born: 16 May 1950 (age 75)
- Occupation: Curler
- Known for: 5-time Swiss Championship

Erika Müller (born 16 May 1950) is a Swiss curler. She skipped her teams from Bern Egghölzli Curling Club and Wetzikon Curling Club to five Swiss Championship titles in 1982, 1983, 1985, 1986 and 1988. With her teammates Barbara Meyer, Barbara Meier and Cristina Wirz, she was the winning team at the 1983 World Curling Championships in Moose Jaw, Canada. In the final game Switzerland defeated Norway by the score of 18:3, the highest score in the history of World Curling Championship finals. She won a Bronze Medal at the World Curling Championships 1985 in Jönköping, Sweden. In 1983, she won a Bronze Medal at the European Curling Championships in Västeras, Sweden.

She later became a national coach for the Swisscurling Association and successfully coached Swiss teams to international medals in World and European Curling Championships.

She pursued a career in international seniors curling and won a Silver Medal at the World Senior Curling Championships 2002 in Bismarck, North Dakota, USA.
