= List of European Curling Champions =

The following is a list of the winners of the European Curling Championships since the inception of the championships in 1975.

Name of fourth, then third, second, lead and alternate (if have) is listed in the team member list. Name of skip is in Bold.

== Medallists (Men's) ==
Men's European curling champions
Year	Gold		Silver		Bronze	
Year	Country	Team	Country	Team	Country	Team
1975	Norway	**Knut Bjaanaes**; Sven Kroken; Helmer Strømbo; Kjell Ulrichsen	Sweden	**Kjell Oscarius**; Bengt Oscarius; Tom Schaeffer; Claes-Göran Carlman	Scotland	**Ken Marwick**; Robert Smellie; John Smith; John Dickson
1976	Switzerland	**Peter Attinger Jr.** Bernhard Attinger; Mattias Neuenschwander; Ruedi Attinger	Norway	**Kristian Sørum**; Morten Sørum; Gunnar Meland; Gunnar Sigstadstø	Sweden	**Jens Håkansson**; Thomas Håkansson; Per Lindeman; Lars Lindgren
1976	Switzerland	**Peter Attinger Jr.** Bernhard Attinger; Mattias Neuenschwander; Ruedi Attinger	Norway	**Kristian Sørum**; Morten Sørum; Gunnar Meland; Gunnar Sigstadstø	Scotland	**Jim Steele**; Lockhart Steele; Ian Fairbairn; Jon Veitch
1977	Sweden	**Ragnar Kamp**; Björn Rudström; Håkan Rudström; Christer Mårtensson	Scotland	**Ken Horton**; Willie Jamieson; Keith Douglas; Richard Harding	West Germany	**Hans Jörg Herberg**; Sigi Heinle; Wolfgang Metzeler; Franz Schmidt
1978	Switzerland	**Jürg Tanner**; Jürg Hornisberger; Franz Tanner; Patrik Lörtscher	Sweden	Anders Thidholm; Hans Söderström; Anders Nilsson; **Bertil Timan**	Denmark	**Tommy Stjerne**; Oluf Olsen; Steen Hansen; Peter Andersen
1979	Scotland	**Jimmy Waddell**; Willie Frame; Jim Forrest; George Bryan	Sweden	**Jan Ullsten**; Anders Thidholm; Anders Nilsson; Hans Söderström; Bertil Timan	Italy	**Giuseppe Dal Molin**; Andrea Pavani; Giancarlo Valt; Enea Pavani
1979	Scotland	**Jimmy Waddell**; Willie Frame; Jim Forrest; George Bryan	Sweden	**Jan Ullsten**; Anders Thidholm; Anders Nilsson; Hans Söderström; Bertil Timan	Norway	**Kristian Sørum**; Eigil Ramsfjell; Gunnar Meland; Harald Ramsfjell
1980	Scotland	**Barton Henderson**; Greig Henderson; Bill Henderson; Alistair Sinclair	Norway	**Kristian Sørum**; Eigil Ramsfjell; Gunnar Meland; Dagfinn Loen	Sweden	**Anders Eriksson**; Lars Eriksson; Ulf Sundström; Håkan Svernell
1981	Switzerland	**Jürg Tanner**; Jürg Hornisberger; Patrik Lörtscher; Franz Tanner	Sweden	**Göran Roxin**; Björn Rudström; Håkan Rudström; Christer Mårtensson; Hans Timan	Denmark	**Per Berg**; Gert Larsen; Jan Hansen; Michael Harry
1982	Scotland	**Mike Hay**; David Hay; David Smith; Russell Keiller	West Germany	**Keith Wendorf**; Hans Dieter Kiesel; Sven Saile; Heiner Martin	Switzerland	**Jürg Tanner**; Jürg Hornisberger; Patrik Lörtscher; Franz Tanner
1983	Switzerland	**Amédéé Biner**; Walter Bielser; Alex Aufdenblatten; Alfred Paci	Norway	**Kristian Sørum**; Morten Søgård; Dagfinn Loen; Morten Skaug	Scotland	**Mike Hay**; David Hay; David Smith; Russell Keiller
1984	Switzerland	**Peter Attinger Jr.** Bernhard Attinger; Werner Attinger; Kurt Attinger	Scotland	**Peter Wilson**; Norman Brown; Hugh Aitken; Roger McIntyre	Norway	**Kristian Sørum**; Morten Søgård; Dagfinn Loen; Morten Skaug
1985	West Germany	**Rodger Gustaf Schmidt**; Wolfgang Burba; Johnny Jahr; Hans-Joachim Burba	Sweden	Connie Östlund; **Per Lindeman**; Bo Andersson; Göran Åberg	Norway	**Eigil Ramsfjell**; Sjur Loen; Gunnar Meland; Morten Skaug
1986	Switzerland	**Felix Luchsinger**; Thomas Grendelmeier; Daniel Streiff; Fritz Luchsinger	Sweden	**Göran Roxin**; Claes Roxin; Björn Roxin; Lars-Eric Roxin; Anders Ehrling	Norway	**Tormod Andreassen**; Flemming Davanger; Stig-Arne Gunnestad; Kjell Berg
1987	Sweden	**Thomas Norgren**; Jan Strandlund; Lars Strandqvist; Lars Engblom; Olle Håkansson	Norway	**Eigil Ramsfjell**; Sjur Loen; Morten Søgård; Bo Bakke	Switzerland	**Dieter Wüest**; Jens Piesbergen; Peter Grendelmeier; Simon Roth
1988	Scotland	**David Smith**; Mike Hay; Peter Smith; David Hay	Norway	**Eigil Ramsfjell**; Sjur Loen; Morten Søgård; Dagfinn Loen	Switzerland	**Bernhard Attinger**; Werner Attinger; Martin Zürrer; Marcel Senn
1989	Scotland	**Hammy McMillan**; Norman Brown; Hugh Aitken; Jim Cannon	Norway	**Eigil Ramsfjell**; Dagfinn Loen; Espen de Lange; Thoralf Hognestad; Bent Ånund Ramsfjell	West Germany	**Keith Wendorf**; Sven Saile; Christoph Möckel; Uwe Saile
1990	Sweden	**Mikael Hasselborg**; Hans Nordin; Lars Vågberg; Stefan Hasselborg	Scotland	**Robin Gray**; Kenneth Knox; Kerr Graham; William Hogg	Norway	**Eigil Ramsfjell**; Sjur Loen; Morten Skaug; Niclas Järund
1991	Germany	**Roland Jentsch**; Uli Sutor; Charlie Kapp; Alexander Huchel; Uli Kapp	Scotland	**David Smith**; Graeme Connal; Peter Smith; David Hay	Switzerland	**Daniel Model**; Mario Flückiger; Michael Lips; Thomas Lips; Marc Brügger
1992	Germany	**Andy Kapp**; Uli Kapp; Michael Schäffer; Oliver Axnick; Holger Höhne	Sweden	**Per Carlsén**; Henrik Holmberg; Tommy Olin; Olle Håkansson; Mikael Norberg	Switzerland	**Urs Dick**; Jürg Dick; Robert Hürlimann; Peter Däppen
1992	Germany	**Andy Kapp**; Uli Kapp; Michael Schäffer; Oliver Axnick; Holger Höhne	Sweden	**Per Carlsén**; Henrik Holmberg; Tommy Olin; Olle Håkansson; Mikael Norberg	Scotland	**David Smith**; Graeme Connal; Peter Smith; David Hay; Gordon Muirhead
1993	Norway	**Eigil Ramsfjell**; Sjur Loen; Dagfinn Loen; Niclas Järund; Espen de Lange	Denmark	**Tommy Stjerne**; Per Berg; Peter Andersen; Ivan Frederiksen; Anders Søderblom	Switzerland	**Markus Eggler**; Dominic Andres; Björn Schröder; Stefan Hofer; Andreas Schwaller
1994	Scotland	**Hammy McMillan**; Norman Brown; Mike Hay; Roger McIntyre; Gordon Muirhead	Switzerland	**Hansjörg Lips**; Stefan Luder; Peter Lips; Rico Simen; Björn Schröder	Sweden	**Mikael Hasselborg**; Hans Nordin; Lars Vågberg; Stefan Hasselborg; Lars-Åke Nordström
1995	Scotland	**Hammy McMillan**; Norman Brown; Mike Hay; Roger McIntyre; Brian Binnie	Switzerland	**André Flotron**; Jens Piesbergen; Peter Grendelmeier; Guido Tischhauser; Martin Stoll	Norway	**Eigil Ramsfjell**; Jan Thoresen; Tore Torvbråten; Anthon Grimsmo; Sjur Loen
1996	Scotland	**Hammy McMillan**; Norman Brown; Mike Hay; Brian Binnie; Peter Loudon	Sweden	**Lars-Åke Nordström**; Jan Strandlund; Örjan Jonsson; Owe Ljungdahl; Hans Nordin	Switzerland	**Felix Luchsinger**; Werner Attinger; Markus Foitek; Markus Luchsinger; Thomas Grendelmeier
1997	Germany	**Andy Kapp**; Uli Kapp; Oliver Axnick; Holger Höhne; Michael Schäffer	Denmark	**Ulrik Schmidt**; Lasse Lavrsen; Brian Hansen; Carsten Svensgaard	Scotland	**Douglas Dryburgh**; Peter Wilson; Philip Wilson; Ronnie Napier; James Dryburgh
1998	Sweden	**Peja Lindholm**; Tomas Nordin; Magnus Swartling; Peter Narup; Joakim Carlsson	Scotland	**Gordon Muirhead**; David Smith; Peter Smith; David Hay; John Muir	Norway	**Tormod Andreassen**; Niclas Järund; Stig-Arne Gunnestad; Kjell Berg; Stig Høiberg
1999	Scotland	**Hammy McMillan**; Warwick Smith; Ewan MacDonald; Peter Loudon; James Dryburgh	Denmark	**Ulrik Schmidt**; Lasse Lavrsen; Brian Hansen; Carsten Svensgaard; Bo Jensen	Finland	**Markku Uusipaavalniemi**; Wille Mäkelä; Tommi Häti; Jari Laukkanen; Raimo Lind
2000	Finland	**Markku Uusipaavalniemi**; Wille Mäkelä; Tommi Häti; Jari Laukkanen; Pekka Saarelainen	Denmark	**Ulrik Schmidt**; Lasse Lavrsen; Brian Hansen; Carsten Svensgaard; Frants Gufler	Sweden	**Peja Lindholm**; Tomas Nordin; Magnus Swartling; Peter Narup; Anders Kraupp
2001	Sweden	**Peja Lindholm**; Tomas Nordin; Magnus Swartling; Peter Narup; Anders Kraupp	Switzerland	**Andreas Schwaller**; Christof Schwaller; Markus Eggler; Damian Grichting; Marco Ramstein	Finland	**Markku Uusipaavalniemi**; Wille Mäkelä; Tommi Häti; Jari Laukkanen; Pekka Saarelainen
2002	Germany	**Sebastian Stock**; Daniel Herberg; Stephan Knoll; Markus Messenzehl; Patrick Hoffman	Sweden	**Peja Lindholm**; Tomas Nordin; Magnus Swartling; Peter Narup; Anders Kraupp	Norway	**Thomas Ulsrud**; Torger Nergård; Thomas Due; Johan Høstmælingen; Thomas Løvold
2003	Scotland	**David Murdoch**; Craig Wilson; Neil Murdoch; Euan Byers; Ronald Brewster	Sweden	**Peja Lindholm**; Tomas Nordin; Magnus Swartling; Peter Narup; Anders Kraupp	Denmark	**Ulrik Schmidt**; Lasse Lavrsen; Carsten Svensgaard; Joel Ostrowski; Torkil Svensgaard
2004	Germany	**Sebastian Stock**; Daniel Herberg; Stephan Knoll; Markus Messenzehl; Patrick Hoffman	Sweden	**Peja Lindholm**; Tomas Nordin; Magnus Swartling; Peter Narup; Anders Kraupp	Norway	**Pål Trulsen**; Lars Vågberg; Flemming Davanger; Bent Ånund Ramsfjell; Niels Siggaard Andersen
2005	Norway	**Pål Trulsen**; Lars Vågberg; Flemming Davanger; Bent Ånund Ramsfjell; Torger Nergård	Sweden	**Peja Lindholm**; Tomas Nordin; Magnus Swartling; Peter Narup; Anders Kraupp	Scotland	**David Murdoch**; Craig Wilson; Ewan MacDonald; Euan Byers; Warwick Smith
2006	Switzerland	**Andreas Schwaller**; Ralph Stöckli; Thomas Lips; Damian Grichting; Raphael Brütsch	Scotland	**David Murdoch**; Ewan MacDonald; Peter Smith; Euan Byers; David Hay	Sweden	**Per Carlsén**; Mikael Norberg; Rickard Hallström; Fredrik Hallström; Nils Carlsén
2007	Scotland	**David Murdoch**; Graeme Connal; Peter Smith; Euan Byers; Peter Loudon	Norway	**Thomas Ulsrud**; Torger Nergård; Christoffer Svae; Håvard Vad Petersson; Thomas Due	Denmark	**Johnny Frederiksen**; Lars Vilandt; Bo Jensen; Kenneth Hertsdahl; Mikkel Poulsen
2008	Scotland	**David Murdoch**; Ewan MacDonald; Peter Smith; Euan Byers; Graeme Connal	Norway	**Thomas Ulsrud**; Torger Nergård; Christoffer Svae; Håvard Vad Petersson; Thomas Due	Germany	**Andy Kapp**; Andreas Lang; Uli Kapp; Holger Höhne; Andreas Kempf
2009	Sweden	**Niklas Edin**; Sebastian Kraupp; Fredrik Lindberg; Viktor Kjäll; Oskar Eriksson	Switzerland	**Ralph Stöckli**; Jan Hauser; Markus Eggler; Simon Strübin; Toni Müller	Norway	**Thomas Ulsrud**; Torger Nergård; Christoffer Svae; Håvard Vad Petersson; Thomas Løvold
2010	Norway	**Thomas Ulsrud**; Torger Nergård; Christoffer Svae; Håvard Vad Petersson; Markus Høiberg	Denmark	**Rasmus Stjerne**; Mikkel Krause; Mikkel Poulsen; Troels Harry; Johnny Frederiksen	Switzerland	**Christof Schwaller**; Marco Ramstein; Robert Hürlimann; Urs Eichhorn; Toni Müller
2011	Norway	**Thomas Ulsrud**; Torger Nergård; Christoffer Svae; Håvard Vad Petersson; Thomas Løvold	Sweden	**Niklas Edin**; Sebastian Kraupp; Fredrik Lindberg; Viktor Kjäll; Oskar Eriksson	Denmark	**Rasmus Stjerne**; Johnny Frederiksen; Mikkel Poulsen; Troels Harry; Lars Vilandt
2012	Sweden	**Niklas Edin**; Sebastian Kraupp; Fredrik Lindberg; Viktor Kjäll; Oskar Eriksson	Norway	**Thomas Ulsrud**; Torger Nergård; Christoffer Svae; Håvard Vad Petersson; Thomas Løvold	Czech Republic	**Jiří Snítil**; Martin Snítil; Jakub Bareš; Jindřich Kitzberger; Marek Vydra
2013	Switzerland	**Sven Michel**; Claudio Pätz; Sandro Trolliet; Simon Gempeler; Benoît Schwarz	Norway	**Thomas Ulsrud**; Torger Nergård; Christoffer Svae; Håvard Vad Petersson; Markus Høiberg	Scotland	**David Murdoch**; Greg Drummond; Scott Andrews; Michael Goodfellow; Tom Brewster
2014	Sweden	**Niklas Edin**; Oskar Eriksson; Kristian Lindström; Christoffer Sundgren; Henrik Leek	Norway	**Thomas Ulsrud**; Torger Nergård; Christoffer Svae; Håvard Vad Petersson; Sander Rølvåg	Switzerland	**Sven Michel**; Florian Meister; Simon Gempeler; Stefan Meienberg; Marc Pfister
2015	Sweden	**Niklas Edin**; Oskar Eriksson; Kristian Lindström; Christoffer Sundgren; Henrik Leek	Switzerland	Benoît Schwarz; Claudio Pätz; **Peter de Cruz**; Valentin Tanner; Michael Probst	Norway	**Thomas Ulsrud**; Torger Nergård; Christoffer Svae; Håvard Vad Petersson; Sander Rølvåg
2016	Sweden	**Niklas Edin**; Oskar Eriksson; Rasmus Wranå; Christoffer Sundgren; Henrik Leek	Norway	**Thomas Ulsrud**; Torger Nergård; Christoffer Svae; Håvard Vad Petersson; Sander Rølvåg	Switzerland	Benoît Schwarz; Claudio Pätz; **Peter de Cruz**; Valentin Tanner; Reto Gribi
2017	Sweden	**Niklas Edin**; Oskar Eriksson; Rasmus Wranå; Christoffer Sundgren; Henrik Leek	Scotland	**Kyle Smith**; Thomas Muirhead; Kyle Waddell; Cammy Smith; Glen Muirhead	Switzerland	Benoît Schwarz; Claudio Pätz; **Peter de Cruz**; Valentin Tanner; Dominik Märki
2018	Scotland	**Bruce Mouat**; Grant Hardie; Bobby Lammie; Hammy McMillan Jr. Ross Whyte	Sweden	**Niklas Edin**; Oskar Eriksson; Rasmus Wranå; Christoffer Sundgren; Daniel Magnusson	Italy	**Joël Retornaz**; Amos Mosaner; Sebastiano Arman; Simone Gonin; Fabio Ribotta
2019	Sweden	**Niklas Edin**; Oskar Eriksson; Rasmus Wranå; Christoffer Sundgren; Daniel Magnusson	Switzerland	**Yannick Schwaller**; Michael Brunner; Romano Meier; Marcel Käufeler; Lucien Lottenbach	Scotland	**Ross Paterson**; Kyle Waddell; Duncan Menzies; Michael Goodfellow; Craig Waddell
2020	Cancelled					
2021	Scotland	**Bruce Mouat**; Grant Hardie; Bobby Lammie; Hammy McMillan Jr. Ross Whyte	Sweden	**Niklas Edin**; Oskar Eriksson; Rasmus Wranå; Christoffer Sundgren; Daniel Magnusson	Italy	**Joël Retornaz**; Amos Mosaner; Sebastiano Arman; Simone Gonin; Mattia Giovanella
2022	Scotland	**Bruce Mouat**; Grant Hardie; Bobby Lammie; Hammy McMillan Jr. Kyle Waddell	Switzerland	Benoît Schwarz; **Yannick Schwaller**; Sven Michel; Pablo Lachat	Italy	**Joël Retornaz**; Amos Mosaner; Sebastiano Arman; Mattia Giovanella; Alberto Pimpini
2023	Scotland	**Bruce Mouat**; Grant Hardie; Bobby Lammie; Hammy McMillan Jr. Kyle Waddell	Sweden	**Niklas Edin**; Oskar Eriksson; Rasmus Wranå; Christoffer Sundgren; Daniel Magnusson	Switzerland	Benoît Schwarz-van Berkel; **Yannick Schwaller**; Sven Michel; Pablo Lachat; Kim Schwaller
2024	Germany	**Marc Muskatewitz**; Benjamin Kapp; Felix Messenzehl; Johannes Scheuerl; Mario Trevisiol	Scotland	**Bruce Mouat**; Grant Hardie; Bobby Lammie; Hammy McMillan Jr. Kyle Waddell	Norway	**Magnus Ramsfjell**; Martin Sesaker; Bendik Ramsfjell; Gaute Nepstad; Wilhelm Næss
2025	Sweden	**Niklas Edin**; Oskar Eriksson; Rasmus Wranå; Christoffer Sundgren; Simon Olofsson	Switzerland	Benoît Schwarz-van Berkel; **Yannick Schwaller**; Sven Michel; Pablo Lachat-Couchepin; Kim Schwaller	Scotland	**Bruce Mouat**; Grant Hardie; Bobby Lammie; Hammy McMillan Jr. Kyle Waddell
2026	Scotland	Ross Whyte; **Grant Hardie**; Craig Waddell; Euan Kyle; Duncan Menzies	Italy	**Stefano Spiller**; Amos Mosaner; Sebastiano Arman; Cesare Spiller	Sweden	**Oskar Eriksson**; Rasmus Wranå; Simon Olofsson; Christoffer Sundgren; Alexander Lindström
2027						

== Medallists (Women's) ==
Women's European curling champions
Year	Gold		Silver		Bronze	
Year	Country	Team	Country	Team	Country	Team
1975	Scotland	**Betty Law**; Jessie Whiteford; Beth Lindsay; Isobel Ross	Sweden	**Elisabeth Branäs**; Eva Rosenhed; Britt-Marie Lundin; Anne-Marie Ericsson	Switzerland	**Berty Schriber**; Marcelle Muheim; Madeleine Buffoni; Liselotte Schriber
1976	Sweden	**Elisabeth Branäs**; Elisabeth Högström; Eva Rosenhed; Anne-Marie Ericsson	France	**Paulette Delachat**; Suzanne Parodi; Erna Gay; Francoise Duclos	Scotland	**Sandra South**; Sheena Hay; Margareth Ross; Elisabeth Manson
1976	Sweden	**Elisabeth Branäs**; Elisabeth Högström; Eva Rosenhed; Anne-Marie Ericsson	France	**Paulette Delachat**; Suzanne Parodi; Erna Gay; Francoise Duclos	England	**Connie Miller**; Susan Hinds; Christine Black; Freda Fischer
1977	Sweden	**Elisabeth Branäs**; Eva Rosenhed; Britt-Marie Ericson; Anne-Marie Ericsson	Switzerland	**Nicole Zloczower**; Rose Marie Steffen; Ebe Beyeler; Nelly Moser	Scotland	**Betty Law**; Bea Dodds; Margaret Paterson; Margaret Cadzow
1978	Sweden	**Inga Arfwidsson**; Barbro Arfwidsson; Ingrid Appelquist; Gunvor Björhäll	Switzerland	**Heidi Neuenschwander**; Dorli Broger; Brigitte Kienast; Evi Rüegsegger	Scotland	**Isobel Torrance**; Marion Armour; Isobel Waddell; Margaret Wiseman
1979	Switzerland	**Gaby Casanova**; Betty Bourquin; Linda Thommen; Rosi Manger	Sweden	**Birgitta Törn**; Katarina Hultling; Susanne Gynning-Ödling; Gunilla Bergman	Scotland	**Beth Lindsay**; Ann McKellar; Jeanette Johnston; May Taylor
1980	Sweden	**Elisabeth Högström**; Carina Olsson; Birgitta Sewik; Karin Sjögren	Norway	**Ellen Githmark**; Trine Trulsen; Ingvill Githmark; Kirsten Vaule	Scotland	**Betty Law**; Bea Sinclair; Jane Sanderson; Carol Hamilton
1980	Sweden	**Elisabeth Högström**; Carina Olsson; Birgitta Sewik; Karin Sjögren	Norway	**Ellen Githmark**; Trine Trulsen; Ingvill Githmark; Kirsten Vaule	West Germany	**Andrea Schöpp**; Elinore Schöpp; Anneliese Diemer; Monika Wagner
1981	Switzerland	**Susan Schlapbach**; Irene Bürgi; Ursula Schlapbach; Katrin Peterhans	Sweden	**Elisabeth Högström**; Katarina Hultling; Birgitta Sewik; Karin Sjögren	Denmark	**Helena Blach**; Marianne Jørgensen; Astrid Birnbaum; Malene Krause
1982	Sweden	**Elisabeth Högström**; Katarina Hultling; Birgitta Sewik; Karin Sjögren	Italy	**Maria-Grazzia Constantini**; Ann Lacedelli; Nella Alverà; Angela Constantini	Switzerland	**Susan Schlapbach**; Irene Bürgi; Ursula Schlapbach; Katrin Peterhans
1983	Sweden	**Elisabeth Högström**; Katarina Hultling; Birgitta Sewik; Karin Sjögren	Norway	**Trine Trulsen**; Dordi Nordby; Hanne Pettersen; Anne Gotteberg	Switzerland	**Erika Müller**; Barbara Meyer; Barbara Meier; Cristina Wirz
1984	West Germany	**Almut Hege**; Josefine Einsle; Suzanne Koch; Petra Tschetsch	Sweden	**Anette Norberg**; Sofie Marmont; Anna Rindeskog; Louise Marmont	Switzerland	**Irene Bürgi**; Isabelle Köpfli; Evi Attinger; Brigitte Kienast
1985	Switzerland	**Jaqueline Landolt**; Christine Krieg; Marianne Uhlmann; Silvia Benoit	Scotland	**Jeanette Johnston**; Catherine Dodds; Marjorie Kidd; Ella Gallanders	Norway	**Trine Trulsen**; Dordi Nordby; Hanne Pettersen; Mette Halvorsen
1986	West Germany	**Andrea Schöpp**; Almut Hege; Monika Wagner; Elinore Schöpp	Switzerland	**Liliane Raisin**; Claude Orizet; Carole Barbey; Beatrice Pochon	Denmark	**Maj-Brit Rejnholdt-Christensen**; Jane Bidstrup; Hanne Olsen; Lone Bagge
1987	West Germany	**Andrea Schöpp**; Almut Hege; Monika Wagner; Suzanne Fink	Sweden	**Anette Norberg**; Sofie Marmont; Anna Rindeskog; Louise Marmont	Norway	**Trine Trulsen**; Dordi Nordby; Hanne Pettersen; Mette Halvorsen
1988	Sweden	**Elisabeth Högström**; Anette Norberg; Monika Jansson; Marie Henriksson	Scotland	**Hazel McGregor**; Edith Loudon; Fiona Bayne; Katie Loudon	Switzerland	**Cristina Lestander**; Barbara Meier; Ingrid Thulin; Katrin Peterhans
1989	West Germany	**Andrea Schöpp**; Monika Wagner; Christina Haller; Heike Wieländer	Switzerland	**Marianne Flotron**; Daniela Sartori; Esther Christen; Caroline Rück	Sweden	**Anette Norberg**; Anna Rindeskog; Sofie Marmont; Louise Marmont
1990	Norway	**Dordi Nordby**; Hanne Pettersen; Mette Halvorsen; Anne Jøtun	Scotland	**Hazel Erskine**; Edith Loudon; Katie Loudon; Fiona Bayne	Switzerland	**Cristina Lestander**; Christine Krieg; Nicole Oetliker; Christina Gartenmann
1991	Germany	**Andrea Schöpp**; Stephanie Mayr; Monika Wagner; Sabine Huth	Norway	**Trine Trulsen**; Ellen Githmark; Ingvill Githmark; Billie Sørum	Sweden	**Anette Norberg**; Anna Rindeskog; Cathrine Norberg; Helene Granqvist; Ann-Catrin Kjerr
1992	Sweden	**Elisabet Johansson**; Katarina Nyberg; Louise Marmont; Elisabeth Persson	Scotland	**Kirsty Hay**; Hazel Erskine; Joanna Pegg; Louise Wilkie	Germany	**Andrea Schöpp**; Monika Wagner; Stephanie Mayr; Christiane Scheibel
1992	Sweden	**Elisabet Johansson**; Katarina Nyberg; Louise Marmont; Elisabeth Persson	Scotland	**Kirsty Hay**; Hazel Erskine; Joanna Pegg; Louise Wilkie	Norway	**Trine Trulsen**; Ellen Githmark; Ingvill Githmark; Billie Sørum
1993	Sweden	**Elisabet Johansson**; Katarina Nyberg; Louise Marmont; Elisabeth Persson; Eva Eriksson	Switzerland	**Diana Meichtry**; Claudia Bärtschi; Nicole Strausak; Jutta Tanner-Kober; Graziella Grichting	Norway	**Dordi Nordby**; Hanne Pettersen; Marianne Aspelin; Cecilie Torhaug
1994	Denmark	**Helena Blach Lavrsen**; Dorthe Holm; Margit Pörtner; Helene Jensen; Lisa Richardson	Germany	**Andrea Schöpp**; Monika Wagner; Natalie Nessler; Christina Haller; Heike Wieländer	Norway	**Dordi Nordby**; Hanne Pettersen; Marianne Aspelin; Cecilie Torhaug
1995	Germany	**Andrea Schöpp**; Monika Wagner; Natalie Nessler; Carina Meidele; Heike Wieländer	Scotland	**Kirsty Hay**; Edith Loudon; Karen Addison; Katie Loudon; Claire Milne	Sweden	**Elisabet Gustafson**; Katarina Nyberg; Louise Marmont; Elisabeth Persson; Elisabeth Hansson
1996	Switzerland	**Mirjam Ott**; Marianne Flotron; Franziska von Känel; Caroline Balz; Annina von Planta	Sweden	**Elisabet Gustafson**; Katarina Nyberg; Louise Marmont; Elisabeth Persson; Margaretha Lindahl	Germany	**Andrea Schöpp**; Monika Wagner; Natalie Nessler; Carina Meidele; Heike Wieländer
1997	Sweden	**Elisabet Gustafson**; Katarina Nyberg; Louise Marmont; Elisabeth Persson; Margaretha Lindahl	Denmark	**Helena Blach Lavrsen**; Dorthe Holm; Margit Pörtner; Lisa Richardson; Lene Bidstrup	Germany	**Andrea Schöpp**; Monika Wagner; Natalie Nessler; Carina Meidele; Heike Wieländer
1998	Germany	**Andrea Schöpp**; Natalie Nessler; Heike Wieländer; Jane Boake-Cope; Andrea Stock	Scotland	**Rhona Martin**; Gail McMillan; Mairi Herd; Janice Watt; Claire Milne	Denmark	**Helena Blach Lavrsen**; Dorthe Holm; Trine Qvist; Lisa Richardson; Jeanett Syngre
1999	Norway	**Dordi Nordby**; Hanne Woods; Marianne Aspelin; Cecilie Torhaug	Sweden	**Margaretha Lindahl**; Ulrika Bergman; Anna Bergström; Maria Zackrisson; Maria Engholm	Switzerland	**Luzia Ebnöther**; Nicole Strausak; Tanya Frei; Nadia Raspe; Laurence Bidaud
2000	Sweden	**Elisabet Gustafson**; Katarina Nyberg; Louise Marmont; Elisabeth Persson; Christina Bertrup	Norway	**Dordi Nordby**; Hanne Woods; Kristin Tøsse Løvseth; Cecilie Torhaug; Camilla Holth	Switzerland	**Nadja Heuer**; Carmen Küng; Sybil Bachofen; Vera Heuer; Yvonne Schlunegger
2001	Sweden	**Anette Norberg**; Cathrine Norberg; Eva Lund; Maria Hasselborg; Anna Rindeskog	Denmark	**Lene Bidstrup**; Susanne Slotsager; Malene Krause; Avijaja Lund Nielsen; Lisa Richardson	Switzerland	**Luzia Ebnöther**; Mirjam Ott; Tanya Frei; Nadia Röthlisberger; Laurence Bidaud
2002	Sweden	**Anette Norberg**; Cathrine Norberg; Eva Lund; Helena Lingham; Maria Hasselborg	Denmark	**Dorthe Holm**; Malene Krause; Denise Dupont; Lillian Frøhling; Madeleine Dupont	Norway	**Dordi Nordby**; Hanne Woods; Marianne Haslum; Camilla Holth; Marianne Rørvik
2003	Sweden	**Anette Norberg**; Eva Lund; Cathrine Norberg; Anna Bergström; Maria Prytz	Switzerland	**Luzia Ebnöther**; Carmen Küng; Tanya Frei; Nadia Röthlisberger; Laurence Bidaud	Denmark	**Dorthe Holm**; Malene Krause; Denise Dupont; Camilla Hansen; Lisa Richardson
2004	Sweden	**Anette Norberg**; Eva Lund; Cathrine Norberg; Anna Bergström; Ulrika Bergman	Switzerland	**Mirjam Ott**; Binia Beeli; Brigitte Schori; Michèle Knobel; Valeria Spälty	Norway	**Dordi Nordby**; Linn Githmark; Marianne Haslum; Camilla Holth; Marianne Rørvik
2005	Sweden	**Anette Norberg**; Eva Lund; Cathrine Lindahl; Anna Bergström; Ulrika Bergman	Switzerland	**Mirjam Ott**; Binia Beeli; Valeria Spälty; Michèle Moser; Manuela Kormann	Denmark	**Dorthe Holm**; Denise Dupont; Lene Nielsen; Malene Krause; Maria Poulsen
2006	Russia	**Liudmila Privivkova**; Olga Jarkova; Nkeirouka Ezekh; Ekaterina Galkina; Margarita Fomina	Italy	**Diana Gaspari**; Giulia Lacedelli; Giorgia Apollonio; Violetta Caldart; Elettra de Col	Switzerland	**Mirjam Ott**; Binia Feltscher-Beeli; Valeria Spälty; Janine Greiner; Manuela Kormann
2007	Sweden	**Anette Norberg**; Eva Lund; Cathrine Lindahl; Anna Svärd; Maria Prytz	Scotland	**Kelly Wood**; Jackie Lockhart; Lorna Vevers; Lindsay Wood; Karen Addison	Denmark	**Lene Nielsen**; Helle Simonsen; Camilla Jörgensen; Maria Poulsen; Jeanne Ellegaard
2008	Switzerland	**Mirjam Ott**; Carmen Schäfer; Valeria Spälty; Janine Greiner; Carmen Küng	Sweden	**Anette Norberg**; Eva Lund; Cathrine Lindahl; Anna Svärd; Kajsa Bergström	Denmark	Madeleine Dupont; Denise Dupont; **Angelina Jensen**; Camilla Jensen; Ane Hansen
2009	Germany	**Andrea Schöpp**; Melanie Robillard; Monika Wagner; Stella Heiß; Corinna Scholz	Switzerland	**Mirjam Ott**; Carmen Schäfer; Carmen Küng; Janine Greiner; Binia Feltscher-Beeli	Denmark	Madeleine Dupont; Denise Dupont; **Angelina Jensen**; Camilla Jensen; Ane Hansen
2010	Sweden	**Stina Viktorsson**; Christina Bertrup; Maria Wennerström; Margaretha Sigfridsson; Agnes Knochenhauer	Scotland	**Eve Muirhead**; Kelly Wood; Lorna Vevers; Anne Laird; Anna Sloan	Switzerland	**Mirjam Ott**; Carmen Schäfer; Carmen Küng; Janine Greiner; Irene Schori
2011	Scotland	**Eve Muirhead**; Anna Sloan; Vicki Adams; Claire Hamilton; Kay Adams	Sweden	Maria Prytz; Christina Bertrup; Maria Wennerström; **Margaretha Sigfridsson**; Sabina Kraupp	Russia	**Anna Sidorova**; Liudmila Privivkova; Margarita Fomina; Ekaterina Galkina; Nkeirouka Ezekh
2012	Russia	**Anna Sidorova**; Liudmila Privivkova; Margarita Fomina; Ekaterina Galkina; Nkeirouka Ezekh	Scotland	**Eve Muirhead**; Anna Sloan; Vicki Adams; Claire Hamilton; Sarah Reid	Sweden	Maria Prytz; Christina Bertrup; Maria Wennerström; **Margaretha Sigfridsson**; Agnes Knochenhauer
2013	Sweden	Maria Prytz; Christina Bertrup; Maria Wennerström; **Margaretha Sigfridsson**; Agnes Knochenhauer	Scotland	**Eve Muirhead**; Anna Sloan; Vicki Adams; Claire Hamilton; Lauren Gray	Switzerland	**Mirjam Ott**; Carmen Schäfer; Carmen Küng; Janine Greiner; Alina Pätz
2014	Switzerland	**Binia Feltscher**; Irene Schori; Franziska Kaufmann; Christine Urech; Carole Howald	Russia	**Anna Sidorova**; Margarita Fomina; Alexandra Saitova; Ekaterina Galkina; Nkeirouka Ezekh	Scotland	**Eve Muirhead**; Anna Sloan; Vicki Adams; Sarah Reid; Lauren Gray
2015	Russia	**Anna Sidorova**; Margarita Fomina; Alexandra Raeva; Nkeirouka Ezekh; Alina Kovaleva	Scotland	**Eve Muirhead**; Anna Sloan; Vicki Adams; Sarah Reid; Rachel Hannen	Finland	**Oona Kauste**; Milja Hellsten; Maija Salmiovirta; Marjo Hippi; Jenni Räsänen
2016	Russia	**Victoria Moiseeva**; Uliana Vasilyeva; Galina Arsenkina; Julia Guzieva; Yulia Portunova	Sweden	**Anna Hasselborg**; Sara McManus; Agnes Knochenhauer; Sofia Mabergs; Maria Prytz	Scotland	**Eve Muirhead**; Anna Sloan; Vicki Adams; Lauren Gray; Kelly Schafer
2017	Scotland	**Eve Muirhead**; Anna Sloan; Vicki Adams; Lauren Gray; Kelly Schafer	Sweden	**Anna Hasselborg**; Sara McManus; Agnes Knochenhauer; Sofia Mabergs; Jennie Wåhlin	Italy	**Diana Gaspari**; Veronica Zappone; Chiara Olivieri; Angela Romei; Stefania Constantini
2018	Sweden	**Anna Hasselborg**; Sara McManus; Agnes Knochenhauer; Sofia Mabergs; Johanna Heldin	Switzerland	Alina Pätz; **Silvana Tirinzoni**; Esther Neuenschwander; Melanie Barbezat; Marisa Winkelhausen	Germany	**Daniela Jentsch**; Emira Abbes; Analena Jentsch; Klara-Hermine Fomm; Lena Kapp
2019	Sweden	**Anna Hasselborg**; Sara McManus; Agnes Knochenhauer; Sofia Mabergs; Johanna Heldin	Scotland	**Eve Muirhead**; Lauren Gray; Jennifer Dodds; Vicky Wright; Sophie Sinclair	Switzerland	Alina Pätz; **Silvana Tirinzoni**; Esther Neuenschwander; Melanie Barbezat
2020	Cancelled					
2021	Scotland	**Eve Muirhead**; Vicky Wright; Jennifer Dodds; Hailey Duff; Mili Smith	Sweden	**Anna Hasselborg**; Sara McManus; Agnes Knochenhauer; Sofia Mabergs; Johanna Heldin	Germany	**Daniela Jentsch**; Emira Abbes; Mia Höhne; Analena Jentsch; Klara-Hermine Fomm
2022	Denmark	**Madeleine Dupont**; Mathilde Halse; Denise Dupont; My Larsen; Jasmin Lander	Switzerland	Alina Pätz; **Silvana Tirinzoni**; Carole Howald; Briar Schwaller-Hürlimann; Anna Gut	Scotland	**Rebecca Morrison**; Gina Aitken; Sophie Sinclair; Sophie Jackson; Hailey Duff
2023	Switzerland	Alina Pätz; **Silvana Tirinzoni**; Selina Witschonke; Carole Howald; Stefanie Berset	Italy	**Stefania Constantini**; Elena Mathis; Angela Romei; Giulia Zardini Lacedelli; Marta Lo Deserto	Norway	Kristin Skaslien; **Marianne Rørvik**; Mille Haslev Nordbye; Martine Rønning; Ingeborg Forbregd
2024	Switzerland	Alina Pätz; **Silvana Tirinzoni**; Carole Howald; Selina Witschonke; Stefanie Berset	Sweden	**Anna Hasselborg**; Sara McManus; Agnes Knochenhauer; Sofia Mabergs; Johanna Heldin	Scotland	Rebecca Morrison; Jennifer Dodds; Sophie Sinclair; **Sophie Jackson**; Fay Henderson
2025	Sweden	**Anna Hasselborg**; Sara McManus; Agnes Knochenhauer; Sofia Scharback; Johanna Heldin	Scotland	Rebecca Morrison; Jennifer Dodds; Sophie Sinclair; **Sophie Jackson**; Fay Henderson	Switzerland	**Corrie Hürlimann**; Marina Lörtscher; Stefanie Berset; Celine Schwizgebel; Melina Bezzola
2026	Sweden	**Isabella Wranå**; Almida de Val; Moa Dryburgh; Maria Larsson; Linda Stenlund	Switzerland	**Alina Pätz**; Selina Witschonke; Stefanie Berset; Renée Frigo; Nadine Bärtschiger	Latvia	**Evelīna Barone**; Rēzija Ieviņa; Katrīna Gaidule; Betija Gulbe; Daina Barone
2027						

== Multiple gold medallists ==
As of 2026 European Curling Championships

Include curler with at least 4 gold medals.

=== Men's ===
No.	Curler	Country	Period (Note: Period from the first to the last medals won.)	Gold medal – first place	Silver medal – second place	Bronze medal – third place	Total
1	Oskar Eriksson	Sweden	2009–2026	8	4	1	13
1	Niklas Edin	Sweden	2009–2025	8	4	–	12
3	Christoffer Sundgren	Sweden	2014–2026	6	3	1	10
4	Grant Hardie	Scotland	2018–2026	5	1	1	7
4	Mike Hay	Scotland	1982–1996	5	–	1	6
4	Hammy McMillan	Scotland	1989–1999	5	–	–	5
7	Rasmus Wranå	Sweden	2016–2026	4	3	1	8
7	Bruce Mouat	Scotland	2018–2025	4	1	1	6
7	Bobby Lammie	Scotland	2018–2025	4	1	1	6
7	Hammy McMillan Jr.	Scotland	2018–2025	4	1	1	6
7	Norman Brown	Scotland	1984–1996	4	1	–	5
7	Henrik Leek	Sweden	2014–2017	4	–	–	4

=== Women's ===
No.	Curler	Country	Period	Gold medal – first place	Silver medal – second place	Bronze medal – third place	Total
1	Anette Norberg	Sweden	1984–2008	7	3	2	12
1	Andrea Schöpp	Germany	1980–2009	7	1	4	12
1	Eva Lund	Sweden	1993–2008	7	1	–	8
4	Monika Wagner	Germany	1980–2009	6	1	4	11
4	Cathrine Lindahl	Sweden	1991–2008	6	1	1	8
6	Agnes Knochenhauer	Sweden	2010–2025	5	4	1	10
6	Elisabeth Högström	Sweden	1976–1988	5	1	–	6
8	Louise Marmont	Sweden	1984–2000	4	3	2	9
8	Anna Svärd	Sweden	1999–2008	4	2	–	6
8	Elisabet Gustafson	Sweden	1992–2000	4	1	1	6
8	Katarina Nyberg	Sweden	1992–2000	4	1	1	6
8	Elisabeth Persson	Sweden	1992–2000	4	1	1	6

== Multiple finalists ==
As of 2026 European Curling Championships

Include curler with at least 6 (men's) / 7 (women's) final appearances.

=== Men's ===
No.	Curler	Country	Period	Gold medal – first place	Silver medal – second place	Final	Bronze medal – third place	Total
1	Oskar Eriksson	Sweden	2009–2026	8	4	12	1	13
1	Niklas Edin	Sweden	2009–2025	8	4	12	–	12
3	Christoffer Sundgren	Sweden	2014–2026	6	3	9	1	10
3	Torger Nergård	Norway	2002–2016	3	6	9	3	12
5	Thomas Ulsrud	Norway	2002–2016	2	6	8	3	11
5	Christoffer Svae	Norway	2007–2016	2	6	8	2	10
5	Håvard Vad Petersson	Norway	2007–2016	2	6	8	2	10
8	Rasmus Wranå	Sweden	2016–2026	4	3	7	1	8
9	Grant Hardie	Scotland	2018–2026	5	1	6	1	7
9	Peter Smith	Scotland	1988–2008	3	3	6	1	7
9	Peja Lindholm	Sweden	1998–2005	2	4	6	1	7
9	Tomas Nordin	Sweden	1998–2005	2	4	6	1	7
9	Magnus Swartling	Sweden	1998–2005	2	4	6	1	7
9	Peter Narup	Sweden	1998–2005	2	4	6	1	7

=== Women's ===
No.	Curler	Country	Period	Gold medal – first place	Silver medal – second place	Final	Bronze medal – third place	Total
1	Anette Norberg	Sweden	1984–2008	7	3	10	2	12
2	Agnes Knochenhauer	Sweden	2010–2025	5	4	9	1	10
3	Andrea Schöpp	Germany	1980–2009	7	1	8	4	12
3	Eva Lund	Sweden	1993–2008	7	1	8	–	8
3	Eve Muirhead	Scotland	2010–2021	3	5	8	2	10
6	Monika Wagner	Germany	1980–2009	6	1	7	4	11
6	Cathrine Lindahl	Sweden	1991–2008	6	1	7	1	8
6	Louise Marmont	Sweden	1984–2000	4	3	7	2	9
6	Anna Hasselborg	Sweden	2016–2025	3	4	7	–	7
6	Sara McManus	Sweden	2016–2025	3	4	7	–	7
6	Sofia Scharback	Sweden	2016–2025	3	4	7	–	7

== Multiple medallists ==
As of 2026 European Curling Championships

Include curler with at least 7 (men's) / 8 (women's) medals of any colour.

=== Men's ===
No.	Curler	Country	Period	Gold medal – first place	Silver medal – second place	Bronze medal – third place	Total
1	Oskar Eriksson	Sweden	2009–2026	8	4	1	13
2	Niklas Edin	Sweden	2009–2025	8	4	–	12
2	Torger Nergård	Norway	2002–2016	3	6	3	12
4	Thomas Ulsrud	Norway	2002–2016	2	6	3	11
5	Christoffer Sundgren	Sweden	2014–2026	6	3	1	10
5	Christoffer Svae	Norway	2007–2016	2	6	2	10
5	Håvard Vad Petersson	Norway	2007–2016	2	6	2	10
8	Eigil Ramsfjell	Norway	1979–1995	1	4	4	9
9	Rasmus Wranå	Sweden	2016–2026	4	3	1	8
10	Grant Hardie	Scotland	2018–2026	5	1	1	7
10	Peter Smith	Scotland	1988–2008	3	3	1	7
10	Peja Lindholm	Sweden	1998–2005	2	4	1	7
10	Tomas Nordin	Sweden	1998–2005	2	4	1	7
10	Magnus Swartling	Sweden	1998–2005	2	4	1	7
10	Peter Narup	Sweden	1998–2005	2	4	1	7
10	David Hay	Scotland	1982–2006	2	3	2	7
10	Benoît Schwarz-van Berkel	Switzerland	2013–2025	1	3	3	7

=== Women's ===
No.	Curler	Country	Period	Gold medal – first place	Silver medal – second place	Bronze medal – third place	Total
1	Anette Norberg	Sweden	1984–2008	7	3	2	12
1	Andrea Schöpp	Germany	1980–2009	7	1	4	12
3	Monika Wagner	Germany	1980–2009	6	1	4	11
4	Agnes Knochenhauer	Sweden	2010–2025	5	4	1	10
4	Eve Muirhead	Scotland	2010–2021	3	5	2	10
4	Dordi Nordby	Norway	1983–2004	2	2	6	10
7	Louise Marmont	Sweden	1984–2000	4	3	2	9
7	Mirjam Ott	Switzerland	1996–2013	2	3	4	9
7	Hanne Woods	Norway	1983–2002	2	2	5	9
10	Eva Lund	Sweden	1993–2008	7	1	–	8
10	Cathrine Lindahl	Sweden	1991–2008	6	1	1	8
10	Anna Sloan	Scotland	2010–2017	2	4	2	8

== Records ==
Most championship titles
Discipline	Curler	Country	No.	Years
Men's	Niklas Edin	Sweden	8	2009, 2012, 2014–2017, 2019, 2025
Men's	Oskar Eriksson	Sweden	8	2009, 2012, 2014–2017, 2019, 2025
Women's	Andrea Schöpp	Germany	7	1986–1987, 1989, 1991, 1995, 1998, 2009
Women's	Anette Norberg	Sweden	7	1988, 2001–2005, 2007
Women's	Eva Lund	Sweden	7	1993, 2001–2005, 2007

Most championship finals
Discipline	Curler	Country	No.	Years
Men's	Niklas Edin	Sweden	12	2009, 2011–2012, 2014–2019, 2021, 2023, 2025
Men's	Oskar Eriksson	Sweden	12	2009, 2011–2012, 2014–2019, 2021, 2023, 2025
Women's	Anette Norberg	Sweden	10	1984, 1987–1988, 2001–2005, 2007–2008

Most championship medals
Discipline	Curler	Country	No.	Years
Men's	Oskar Eriksson	Sweden	13	2009, 2011–2012, 2014–2019, 2021, 2023, 2025–2026
Women's	Andrea Schöpp	Germany	12	1980, 1986–1987, 1989, 1991–1992, 1994–1998, 2009
Women's	Anette Norberg	Sweden	12	1984, 1987–1989, 1991, 2001–2005, 2007–2008

Most championship appearances (Note: For year 2000 to 2025, only appearance in A division counts.)
Discipline	Curler	Country	No.	Years
Men's	Torger Nergård	Norway	19	1997, 2000–2003, 2005–2017, 2021
Women's	Andrea Schöpp	Germany	27	1980–1981, 1983, 1986–1987, 1989–1992, 1994–2001, 2003, 2006–2014

Most titles at back-to-back events
Discipline	Curler	Country	No.	Period
Men's	Niklas Edin	Sweden	4	2014–2017
Men's	Oskar Eriksson	Sweden	4	2014–2017
Men's	Christoffer Sundgren	Sweden	4	2014–2017
Men's	Henrik Leek	Sweden	4	2014–2017
Women's	Anette Norberg	Sweden	5	2001–2005
Women's	Eva Lund	Sweden	5	2001–2005
Women's	Cathrine Lindahl	Sweden	5	2001–2005

Most finals at back-to-back events
Discipline	Curler	Country	No.	Period
Men's	Niklas Edin	Sweden	7	2014–2021
Men's	Oskar Eriksson	Sweden	7	2014–2021
Men's	Christoffer Sundgren	Sweden	7	2014–2021
Women's	Anette Norberg	Sweden	5	2001–2005
Women's	Eva Lund	Sweden	5	2001–2005
Women's	Cathrine Lindahl	Sweden	5	2001–2005
Women's	Anna Hasselborg	Sweden	5	2016–2021
Women's	Sara McManus	Sweden	5	2016–2021
Women's	Agnes Knochenhauer	Sweden	5	2016–2021
Women's	Sofia Scharback	Sweden	5	2016–2021

Most medals at back-to-back events
Discipline	Curler	Country	No.	Period
Men's	Thomas Ulsrud	Norway	10	2007–2016
Men's	Torger Nergård	Norway	10	2007–2016
Men's	Christoffer Svae	Norway	10	2007–2016
Men's	Håvard Vad Petersson	Norway	10	2007–2016
Women's	Eve Muirhead	Scotland	8	2010–2017
Women's	Anna Sloan	Scotland	8	2010–2017

Most appearances at back-to-back events
Discipline	Curler	Country	No.	Period
Men's	Oskar Eriksson	Sweden	17	2009–2026
Women's	Nkeirouka Ezekh	Russia	16	2000–2015

Teams went undefeated in championship
Discipline	Year	Country	Skip	Games played
Men's	1977	Sweden	Ragnar Kamp	9
Men's	1978	Switzerland	Jürg Tanner	10
Men's	1981	Switzerland	Jürg Tanner	8
Men's	1982	Scotland	Mike Hay	8
Men's	1989	Scotland	Hammy McMillan	6
Men's	1993	Norway	Eigil Ramsfjell	8
Men's	1996	Scotland	Hammy McMillan	8
Men's	1998	Sweden	Peja Lindholm	8
Men's	2000	Finland	Markku Uusipaavalniemi	11
Men's	2014	Sweden	Niklas Edin	11
Men's	2019	Sweden	Niklas Edin	11
Men's	2021	Scotland	Bruce Mouat	11
Women's	1975	Scotland	Betty Law	6
Women's	1977	Sweden	Elisabeth Branäs	7
Women's	1978	Sweden	Inga Arfwidsson	9
Women's	1982	Sweden	Elisabeth Högström	7
Women's	1984	West Germany	Almut Hege	8
Women's	1986	West Germany	Andrea Schöpp	7
Women's	1988	Sweden	Elisabeth Högström	6
Women's	1989	West Germany	Andrea Schöpp	7
Women's	1990	Norway	Dordi Nordby	7
Women's	2000	Sweden	Elisabet Gustafson	9
Women's	2001	Sweden	Anette Norberg	9
Women's	2003	Sweden	Anette Norberg	11
Women's	2005	Sweden	Anette Norberg	11
Women's	2023	Switzerland	Silvana Tirinzoni	11
Women's	2024	Switzerland	Silvana Tirinzoni	11
Women's	2026	Sweden	Isabella Wranå	7

== See also ==
- List of World Men's Curling Champions
- List of World Women's Curling Champions
- World Mixed Doubles Curling Championship
- List of Olympic medalists in curling
- List of Paralympic medalists in wheelchair curling
- Pan Continental Curling Championships
- List of World Junior Curling Champions

== Notes ==
- 1976, 1979 (men's), 1980 (women's), 1992: Two bronze medals were awarded.
