= Jørn Blach =

Danish male curler

- Curler ♂

Team
- Curling club: Hvidovre CC, Hvidovre

Curling career
- Member Association: Denmark
- World Championship: 3 (1976, 1979, 1980)
- European Championship: 3 (1975, 1976, 1977)
Medal record
Curling
Danish Men's Championship
Gold medal – first place	1976
Gold medal – first place	1980

Jørn Blach is a Danish curler.

At the national level, he is a two-time Danish men's champion curler.

== Teams ==
Season	Skip	Third	Second	Lead	Events
1975–76	Mogen Olsen	John Christiansen	Jørn Blach	Erik Kelnaes	ECC 1975 (7th)
1975–76	Ole Larsen	Jørn Blach	Freddy Bartelsen	Jørn Jørgensen	DMCC 1976 (gold); WCC 1976 (10th)
1976–77	John Olsen	John Christiansen	Jørn Blach	Peter Haase	ECC 1976 (6th)
1977–78	Jørn Blach	Freddy Bartelsen	Bent Jørgensen	Antonny Hinge	ECC 1977 (8th)
1978–79	Jørn Blach	Freddy Bartelsen	Bent Jørgensen	Antonny Hinge	WCC 1979 (10 место)
1979–80	Jørn Blach	Arne Pedersen	Freddy Bartelsen	Bent Jørgensen	DMCC 1980 (gold); WCC 1980 (9th)
