= Britt-Marie Ericson =

Swedish female curler (born 1950)

- Curler ♀
- Other names: Britt-Marie Lundin, Bibbi
- Born: 25 January 1950 (age 76)

Team
- Curling club: Örebro DCK, Örebro

Curling career
- Member Association: Sweden
- European Championship: 3 (1975, 1976, 1977)
Medal record
Curling
European Championships
| Gold medal – first place | 1977 Oslo |
| Silver medal – second place | 1975 Megève |
Swedish Women's Championship
| Gold medal – first place | 1975 |
| Gold medal – first place | 1976 |

Britt-Marie "Bibbi" Ericson (born 25 January 1950 as Britt-Marie Lundin) is a Swedish female curler.

She is a 1977 European champion and two-time Swedish women's champion.

== Teams ==
| Season | Skip | Third | Second | Lead | Events |
|---|---|---|---|---|---|
| 1974–75 | Elisabeth Branäs | Britt-Marie Lundin | Anne-Marie Ericsson | Eva Rosenhed | SWCC 1975 (gold) |
| 1975–76 | Elisabeth Branäs | Eva Rosenhed | Britt-Marie Lundin | Anne-Marie Ericsson | ECC 1975 (silver); SWCC 1976 (gold) |
| 1977–78 | Elisabeth Branäs | Eva Rosenhed | Britt-Marie Ericson | Anne-Marie Ericsson | ECC 1977 (gold) |
