= Jessie Whiteford =

Scottish curler

- Curler ♀

Curling career
- Member Association: Scotland
- European Championship: 1 (1975)
Medal record
Curling
European Championships
| Gold medal – first place | 1975 Megève |

Jessie Whiteford is a former Scottish curler.

She was a champion of the first-ever European Curling Championships, played in 1975.

== Teams ==
=== Women's ===
| Season | Skip | Third | Second | Lead | Events |
|---|---|---|---|---|---|
| 1975–76 | Betty Law | Jessie Whiteford | Beth Lindsay | Isobel Ross | ECC 1975 (gold) |
| 1983–84 | Nancy Whiteford | Jessie Whiteford | Lena Lockart | Mary Stark | SSCC 1984 (gold) |

=== Mixed ===
| Season | Skip | Third | Second | Lead | Events |
|---|---|---|---|---|---|
| 1976 | Jim Whiteford | Jessie Whiteford | Robin Whiteford | Nancy Whiteford | SMxCC 1976 (silver) |
