= Eva Rosenhed =

Swedish female curler (born 1939)

- Curler ♀
- Born: 8 December 1939 (age 86)

Team
- Curling club: Örebro DCK, Örebro

Curling career
- Member Association: Sweden
- European Championship: 3 (1975, 1976, 1977)
Medal record
Curling
European Championships
Gold medal – first place	1976 West Berlin
Gold medal – first place	1977 Oslo
Silver medal – second place	1975 Megève
Swedish Women's Championship
Gold medal – first place	1975
Gold medal – first place	1976
Gold medal – first place	1977

Eva Rosenhed (born 8 December 1939) is a Swedish female curler.

She is a two-time European champion (1976, 1977) and three-time Swedish women's champion.

In 1977 she was inducted into the Swedish Curling Hall of Fame.

== Teams ==
Season	Skip	Third	Second	Lead	Events
1974–75	Elisabeth Branäs	Britt-Marie Lundin	Anne-Marie Ericsson	Eva Rosenhed	SWCC 1975 (gold)
1975–76	Elisabeth Branäs	Eva Rosenhed	Britt-Marie Lundin	Anne-Marie Ericsson	ECC 1975 (silver); SWCC 1976 (gold)
1976–77	Elisabeth Branäs	Elisabeth Högström	Eva Rosenhed	Anne-Marie Ericsson	ECC 1976 (gold)
1976–77	Elisabeth Branäs	Eva Rosenhed	Siv Persson	Anne-Marie Ericsson	SWCC 1977 (gold)
1977–78	Elisabeth Branäs	Eva Rosenhed	Britt-Marie Ericson	Anne-Marie Ericsson	ECC 1977 (gold)
