= Isobel Ross =

Scottish curler

- Curler ♀

Curling career
- Member Association: Scotland
- European Championship: 1 (1975)
Medal record
Curling
European Championships
Gold medal – first place	1975 Megève

Isobel Ross is a former Scottish curler.

She is a champion of the first-ever European Curling Championships, played in 1975.

== Teams ==
Season	Skip	Third	Second	Lead	Events
1975–76	Betty Law	Jessie Whiteford	Beth Lindsay	Isobel Ross	ECC 1975 (gold)
1994–95	Isobel Ross	Margaret Ross	Ella Walker	Sandra South	SSCC 1995 (gold)
