= Klaus Kanz =

German curler

- Curler ♂

Team
- Curling club: EC Bad Tölz, Bad Tölz

Curling career
- Member Association: Germany
- World Championship: 4 (1973, 1975, 1976, 1977)
- European Championship: 2 (1975, 1976)
Medal record
Curling

Klaus Kanz is a former German curler.

He skipped German national men's team on four World championships and two European championships.

== Teams ==
Season	Skip	Third	Second	Lead	Events
1972–73	Klaus Kanz	Heinz Kellner	Manfred Rösgen	Manfred Schulze	WCC 1973 (8th)
1974–75	Klaus Kanz	Manfred Rösgen	Manfred Schulze	Adalbert Mayer	WCC 1975 (7th)
1975–76	Klaus Kanz	Manfred Schulze	Manfred Rösgen	Adalbert Mayer	ECC 1975 (4th)
1975–76	Klaus Kanz	Manfred Rösgen	Manfred Schulze	Adalbert Mayer	WCC 1976 (8th)
1976–77	Klaus Kanz	Manfred Schulze	Hans Österreicher	Jan Eckhart	ECC 1976 (7th); WCC 1977 (8th)
