= Håkan Rudström =

Swedish male curler and coach (born 1957)

- Curler ♂
- Born: 5 January 1957 (age 69)

Team
- Curling club: Härnösands CK, Härnösand & Magnus Ladulås CK, Stockholm

Curling career
- Member Association: Sweden
- World Championship: 1 (1977)
- European Championship: 2 (1977, 1981)
Medal record
Curling
World Championships
| Gold medal – first place | 1977 Karlstad |
European Championships
| Gold medal – first place | 1977 Oslo |
| Silver medal – second place | 1981 Grindelwald |
Swedish Men's Championship
| Gold medal – first place | 1977 |

Håkan Rudström (born 5 January 1957, Härnösand, Sweden) is a Swedish curler and curling coach.

He is a 1977 World Men's champion, a 1977 European champion and a Swedish men's champion.

In 1980 he was inducted into the Swedish Curling Hall of Fame.

== Teams ==
| Season | Skip | Third | Second | Lead | Alternate | Events |
|---|---|---|---|---|---|---|
| 1976–77 | Ragnar Kamp | Håkan Rudström | Björn Rudström | Christer Mårtensson | | SMCC 1977 (gold); WCC 1977 (gold) |
| 1977–78 | Ragnar Kamp | Björn Rudström | Håkan Rudström | Christer Mårtensson | | ECC 1977 (gold) |
| 1981–82 | Göran Roxin | Björn Rudström | Håkan Rudström | Christer Mårtensson | Hans Timan | ECC 1981 (silver) |

== Private life ==
Rudström is from family of curlers. His older brother, Björn, was Håkan's teammate when they won the World and European championships. Björn's daughter, Karin, is a 2011 World Women's champion. Håkan's daughter, Amalia, played for Sweden at the 2012 Winter Youth Olympics.
