= Betty Law =

Scottish curler

- Curler ♀
- Born: 11 April 1928; Newburgh, Fife, Scotland
- Died: 19 May 2001 (aged 73)

Team
- Curling club: Perth CC, Perth

Curling career
- Member Association: Scotland
- World Championship: 1 (1980)
- European Championship: 3 (1975, 1977, 1980)
Medal record
Curling
World Championships
Bronze medal – third place	1980 Perth
European Championships
Gold medal – first place	1975 Megève
Bronze medal – third place	1977 Oslo
Bronze medal – third place	1980 Copenhagen
Scottish Women's Championship
Gold medal – first place	1977
Gold medal – first place	1980

Christian Elizabeth "Betty"/"Bett" Law (11 April 1928 – 19 May 2001) was a Scottish curler.

She was a champion of the first-ever European Curling Championships, played in 1975, a 1980 World championship bronze medallist and a two-time Scottish women's curling champion.

== Teams ==
Season	Skip	Third	Second	Lead	Events
1975–76	Betty Law	Jessie Whiteford	Beth Lindsay	Isobel Ross	ECC 1975 (gold)
1976–77	Betty Law	Bea Dodds	Margaret Paterson	Margaret Cadzow	SWCC 1977 (gold)
1977–78	Betty Law	Bea Dodds	Margaret Paterson	Margaret Cadzow	ECC 1977 (bronze)
1979–80	Betty Law	Bea Sinclair	Jane Sanderson	Carol Hamilton	SWCC 1980 (gold); WCC 1980 (bronze)
1980–81	Betty Law	Bea Sinclair	Jane Sanderson	Carol Hamilton	ECC 1980 (bronze)
