= Christer Mårtensson =

Swedish male curler

- Curler ♂
- Born: 4 July 1954 (age 72)

Team
- Curling club: Härnösands CK, Härnösand; Magnus Ladulås CK, Stockholm

Curling career
- Member Association: Sweden
- World Championship: 2 (1975, 1977)
- European Championship: 2 (1977, 1981)
Medal record
Curling
World Championships
Gold medal – first place	1977 Karlstad
European Championships
Gold medal – first place	1977 Oslo
Silver medal – second place	1981 Grindelwald
Swedish Men's Championship
Gold medal – first place	1975
Gold medal – first place	1977

Christer Mårtensson (born 4 July 1954) is a Swedish curler and curling coach.

He is a 1977 World Men's champion, a 1977 European champion and a Swedish men's champion.

In 1982 he was inducted into the Swedish Curling Hall of Fame.

== Teams ==
Season	Skip	Third	Second	Lead	Alternate	Events
1973–74	Anders Thidholm	Ragnar Kamp	Christer Mårtensson	Björn Rudström		SJCC 1974 (gold)
1974–75	Ragnar Kamp (fourth)	Björn Rudström	Christer Mårtensson	Axel Kamp (skip)		SMCC 1975 (gold); WCC 1975 (4th)
1976–77	Ragnar Kamp	Håkan Rudström	Björn Rudström	Christer Mårtensson		SMCC 1977 (gold); WCC 1977 (gold)
1977–78	Ragnar Kamp	Björn Rudström	Håkan Rudström	Christer Mårtensson		ECC 1977 (gold)
1981–82	Göran Roxin	Björn Rudström	Håkan Rudström	Christer Mårtensson	Hans Timan	ECC 1981 (silver)
