= Willie Jamieson (curler) =

Scottish male curler

- Curler ♂

Team
- Curling club: Carmunnock & Rutherglen CC, Glasgow

Curling career
- Member Association: Scotland
- World Championship: 1 (1977)
- European Championship: 1 (1977)
- Other appearances: World Junior Championships: 1 (1976)
Medal record
Curling
World Championship
Bronze medal – third place	1977 Karlstad
European Championship
Silver medal – second place	1977 Oslo
Scottish Men's Championship
Gold medal – first place	1977

Willie Jamieson is a Scottish curler. He is a 1977 World Men's bronze medallist and 1977 Scottish men's champion.

== Teams ==
Season	Skip	Third	Second	Lead	Events
1975–76	Robert Kelly	Ken Horton	Willie Jamieson	Keith Douglas	SJCC 1976 (gold); WJCC 1976 (4th)
1976–77	Ken Horton	Willie Jamieson	Keith Douglas	Richard Harding	SMCC 1977 (gold); WCC 1977 (bronze)
1977–78	Ken Horton	Willie Jamieson	Keith Douglas	Richard Harding	ECC 1977 (silver)
