= Björn Rudström =

Swedish male curler and curling coach

- Curler ♂
- Born: 10 May 1954 (age 72); Härnösand, Sweden

Team
- Curling club: Härnösands CK, Magnus Ladulås CK

Curling career
- Member Association: Sweden
- World Championship: 2 (1975, 1977)
- European Championship: 2 (1977, 1981)
- Other appearances: World Senior Championships: 1 (2006)
Medal record
Curling
World Championships
Gold medal – first place	1977 Karlstad
European Championships
Gold medal – first place	1977 Oslo
Silver medal – second place	1981 Grindelwald
World Senior Curling Championships
Bronze medal – third place	2006 Copenhagen
Swedish Men's Championship
Gold medal – first place	1975
Gold medal – first place	1977

Björn Rudström (born 10 May 1954 in Härnösand, Sweden) is a Swedish curler and curling coach.

He is a 1977 World Men's champion, a 1977 European champion and a Swedish men's champion.

In 1978 he was inducted into the Swedish Curling Hall of Fame.

== Teams ==
Season	Skip	Third	Second	Lead	Alternate	Events
1973–74	Anders Thidholm	Ragnar Kamp	Christer Mårtensson	Björn Rudström		SJCC 1974 (gold)
1974–75	Ragnar Kamp (fourth)	Björn Rudström	Christer Mårtensson	Axel Kamp (skip)		SMCC 1975 (gold); WCC 1975 (4th)
1976–77	Ragnar Kamp	Håkan Rudström	Björn Rudström	Christer Mårtensson		SMCC 1977 (gold); WCC 1977 (gold)
1977–78	Ragnar Kamp	Björn Rudström	Håkan Rudström	Christer Mårtensson		ECC 1977 (gold)
1981–82	Göran Roxin	Björn Rudström	Håkan Rudström	Christer Mårtensson	Hans Timan	ECC 1981 (silver)
2005–06	Jan Ullsten	Björn Rudström	Lars Strandqvist	Lars Engblom		WSCC 2006 (bronze)

== Record as a coach of national teams ==
Year	Tournament, event	National team	Place
2013	2013 Winter Universiade	Sweden (students men)	1st place, gold medalist(s)
2013	2013 Winter Universiade	Sweden (students women)	5

== Private life ==
Rudström is from family of curlers. His younger brother Håkan was Björn's teammate when they won the World and European championships. Björn's daughter Karin is a 2011 World Women's champion. Håkan's daughter Amalia played for Sweden at the 2012 Winter Youth Olympics.
