= 1976 World Junior Curling Championships =

- Host city: Aviemore, Scotland
- Dates: February 22–27
- Men's winner: Canada (1st title)
- Skip: Paul Gowsell
- Third: Neil Houston
- Second: Glen Jackson
- Lead: Kelly Stearne
- Finalist: Sweden (Jan Ullsten)

The 1976 World Junior Curling Championships were held from February 22 to 27 in Aviemore, Scotland. The tournament only consisted of a men's event.

== Teams ==
Country	Skip	Third	Second	Lead	Curling club
Canada	Paul Gowsell	Neil Houston	Glen Jackson	Kelly Stearne	William Aberhart HS, Calgary
Denmark	Tommy Stjerne	Oluf Olsen	Peter Andersen	Steen Hansen	Hvidovre CC
France	Claude Feige	Jean-Louis Sibuet	Christian Marin-Pache	Marc Sibuet	Mont d'Arbois CC, Megève
West Germany	Hans Dieter Kiesel	Rainer Schöpp	Wolfgang Artinger	Norbert Petrasch	
Italy	Massimo Alvera	Franco Sovilla	Fabio Bovolenta	Marco Lorenzi	Cortina CC, Cortina d'Ampezzo
Norway	Sjur Loen	Morten Søgaard	Hans Bekkelund	Roar Rise	Brumunddal CC, Oslo
Scotland	Robert Kelly	Ken Horton	Willie Jamieson	Keith Douglas	Carmunnock & Rutherglen CC, Glasgow
Sweden	Jan Ullsten	Mats Nyberg	Anders Grahn	Bo Söderström	Sundsvalls CK, Sundsvall
Switzerland	Jean-Claude Stettler	Marcel Ruefli	Hans Peter Ringli	Christoph Stiep	
United States	Donald Barcome Jr.	Dale Mueller	Gary Mueller	Earl Barcome	Grand Forks CC, North Dakota

== Round robin ==
Place	Team	1	2	3	4	5	6	7	8	9	10	Wins	Losses
1	Norway	*	5:3	4:3	5:4	2:4	7:5	5:9	14:7	8:4	10:2	7	2
2	Scotland	3:5	*	8:4	5:9	5:4	6:3	8:5	11:4	8:4	7:4	7	2
3	Canada	3:4	4:8	*	6:3	9:1	9:4	6:2	8:1	8:4	9:2	7	2
4	Sweden	4:5	9:5	3:6	*	7:3	1:7	9:2	7:6	11:3	7:3	6	3
5	France	4:2	4:5	1:9	3:7	*	7:5	10:8	4:5	9:5	8:7	5	4
6	United States	5:7	3:6	4:9	7:1	5:7	*	5:2	7:5	9:3	6:5	5	4
7	Germany	9:5	5:8	2:6	2:9	8:10	2:5	*	11:2	7:4	7:4	4	5
8	Switzerland	7:14	4:11	1:8	6:7	5:4	5:7	2:11	*	7:3	9:5	3	6
9	Denmark	4:8	4:8	4:8	3:11	5:9	3:9	4:7	3:7	*	11:3	1	8
10	Italy	2:10	4:7	2:9	3:7	7:8	5:6	4:7	5:9	3:11	*	0	9

Teams to playoffs

== Playoffs ==
Semifinal
1	Norway	2
4	Sweden	8
2	Scotland	3
3	Canada	10

Gold Medal Game
4	Sweden	9
3	Canada	4

== Final standings ==
Place	Team	Games played	Wins	Losses
1st place, gold medalist(s)	Canada	11	9	2
2nd place, silver medalist(s)	Sweden	11	7	4
3rd place, bronze medalist(s)	Norway	10	7	3
4	Scotland	10	7	3
5	France	9	5	4
6	United States	9	5	4
7	Germany	9	4	5
8	Switzerland	9	3	6
9	Denmark	9	1	8
10	Italy	9	0	9

== Awards ==
- WJCC Sportsmanship Award: (Italy) Massimo Alvera

All-Star Team:

- Skip: (Scotland) Robert Kelly
- Third: (Scotland) Ken Horton
- Second: (Norway) Sjur Loen
- Lead: (Canada) Kelly Stearne
