= Maria-Grazzia Lacedelli =

Italian curler

- Curler ♀
- Born: Maria-Grazzia Constantini; 15 January 1943 (age 83); Cortina d'Ampezzo

Team
- Curling club: CC Cortina, Cortina d'Ampezzo, CC Olimpia, Cortina d'Ampezzo

Curling career
- Member Association: Italy
- World Championship: 6 (1980, 1981, 1982, 1983, 1984, 1985)
- European Championship: 12 (1975, 1976, 1977, 1978, 1979, 1980, 1981, 1982, 1983, 1984, 1985, 1986)
- Other appearances: World Senior Championships: 2 (2003, 2005)
Medal record
Curling
European Championships
Silver medal – second place	1982 Kirkcaldy

Maria-Grazzia Lacedelli (née Constantini; born 15 January 1943 in Cortina d'Ampezzo) is an Italian curler.

At the international level, she is a 1982 European silver medallist. During 1970s-1980s she was the long-time skip of Italian national women's team, competed on 6 World and 12 European championships.

== Teams ==
Season	Skip	Third	Second	Lead	Alternate	Events
1975–76	Nella Alverà	Maria-Grazzia Constantini	Marina Pavani	Tea Valt		ECC 1975 (6th)
1976–77	Maria-Grazzia Constantini	Tea Valt	Ann Lacedelli	Marina Pavani		ECC 1976 (8th)
1977–78	Maria-Grazzia Constantini	Tea Valt	Ann Lacedelli	Marina Pavani		ECC 1977 (7th)
1978–79	Maria-Grazzia Constantini	Marina Pavani	Ann Lacedelli	Tea Valt		ECC 1978 (9th)
1979–80	Maria-Grazzia Constantini	Tea Valt	Ann Lacedelli	Marina Pavani		ECC 1979 (5th)
1979–80	Maria-Grazzia Constantini	Nella Alverà	Marina Pavani	Ann Lacedelli		WCC 1980 (5th)
1980–81	Maria-Grazzia Constantini	Ann Lacedelli	Tea Valt	Marina Pavani		ECC 1980 (7th); WCC 1981 (7th)
1981–82	Maria-Grazzia Constantini	Ann Lacedelli	Tea Valt	Angela Constantini		ECC 1981 (10th); WCC 1982 (10th)
1982–83	Maria-Grazzia Constantini	Ann Lacedelli	Nella Alverà	Angela Constantini		ECC 1982 (silver); WCC 1983 (9th)
1983–84	Maria-Grazzia Constantini	Tea Valt	Nella Alverà	Angela Constantini		ECC 1983 (9th); WCC 1984 (10th)
1984–85	Maria-Grazzia Constantini	Tea Valt	Nella Alverà	Angela Constantini		ECC 1984 (4th); WCC 1985 (10th)
1985–86	Maria-Grazzia Constantini	Angela Constantini	Tea Valt	Nella Alverà		ECC 1985 (8th)
1986–87	Maria-Grazzia Constantini	Ann Lacedelli	Tea Valt	Angela Constantini		ECC 1986 (6th)
2002–03	Ann Urquhart	Maria-Grazzia Lacedelli	Tea Savoia	Franca Faccin		WSCC 2003 (6th)
2004–05	Ann Urquhart	Maria-Grazzia Lacedelli	Tea Savoia	Franca Faccin	Mafalda Hauseberger	WSCC 2005 (12th)
