= 1977 Air Canada Silver Broom =

- Host city: Karlstad, Sweden
- Arena: Färjestads Ishall
- Dates: March 28 – April 3, 1977
- Winner: Sweden
- Curling club: Härnösands CK, Härnösand
- Skip: Ragnar Kamp
- Third: Håkan Rudström
- Second: Björn Rudström
- Lead: Christer Mårtenson
- Finalist: Canada (Jim Ursel)

The 1977 Air Canada Silver Broom was held from March 28 to April 3 at the Färjestads Ishall in Karlstad, Sweden.

== Teams ==
Canada	Denmark	France	Germany	Italy
St. Laurent CC, Mount Royal, Quebec Skip: Jim Ursel; Third: Art Lobel; Second: Don Aitken; Lead: Brian Ross	Hvidovre CC, Hvidovre Skip: Tommy Stjerne; Third: Oluf Olsen; Second: Steen Hansen; Lead: Peter Andersen	Mont d' Arbois CC, Megève Skip: Pierre Boan; Third: Pierre Duclos; Second: Honore Brangi; Lead: Jean-Claude Gachet	EC Bad Tölz, Bad Tölz Skip: Klaus Kanz; Third: Manfred Schulze; Second: Hans Österreicher; Lead: Jan Eckhart	Cortina CC, Cortina d' Ampezzo Skip: Giuseppe Dal Molin; Third: Andrea Pavani; Second: Giancarlo Valt; Lead: Enea Pavani
Norway	Scotland	Sweden	Switzerland	United States
Trondheim CC, Trondheim Skip: Kristian Sørum; Third: Eigil Ramsfjell; Second: Gunnar Meland; Lead: Gunnar Sigstadstø	Carmunnock & Rutherglen CC, Glasgow Skip: Ken Horton; Third: Willie Jamieson; Second: Keith Douglas; Lead: Richard Harding	Härnösands CK, Härnösand Skip: Ragnar Kamp; Third: Håkan Rudström; Second: Björn Rudström; Lead: Christer Mårtensson	Scuol Tarsap CC Skip: Jon Carl Rizzi; Third: Marcus Florinett; Second: Jon Corradin; Lead: Werner Bundi	Hibbing CC, Minnesota Skip: Bruce Roberts; Third: Paul Pustovar; Second: Jerry Scott; Lead: Gary Kleffman

== Round-robin standings ==
Country	Skip	W	L
Sweden	Ragnar Kamp	8	1
Canada	Jim Ursel	7	2
Scotland	Ken Horton	6	3
United States	Bruce Roberts	6	3
Switzerland	Jon Carl Rizzi	5	4
Norway	Kristian Sørum	5	4
Italy	Giuseppe Dal Molin	4	5
Germany	Klaus Kanz	2	7
France	Pierre Boan	2	7
Denmark	Tommy Stjerne	0	9

== Round-robin results ==
=== Draw 1 ===
Team	Final
Italy (Dal Molin)	7
Sweden (Kamp)	10

Team	Final
Norway (Sørum)	5
Switzerland (Rizzi)	7

Team	Final
Scotland (Horton)	7
Denmark (Stjerne)	5

Team	Final
France (Boan)	5
United States (Roberts)	8

Team	Final
Canada (Ursel)	9
Germany (Kanz)	3

=== Draw 2 ===
Team	Final
Scotland (Horton)	6
Germany (Kanz)	3

Team	Final
Sweden (Kamp)	6
France (Boan)	8

Team	Final
Switzerland (Rizzi)	6
Canada (Ursel)	8

Team	Final
Denmark (Stjerne)	5
Italy (Dal Molin)	6

Team	Final
United States (Roberts)	6
Norway (Sørum)	5

=== Draw 3 ===
Team	Final
United States (Roberts)	5
Canada (Ursel)	8

Team	Final
Germany (Kanz)	5
Italy (Dal Molin)	8

Team	Final
Norway (Sørum)	5
Sweden (Kamp)	6

Team	Final
Scotland (Horton)	3
Switzerland (Rizzi)	6

Team	Final
France (Boan)	8
Denmark (Stjerne)	7

=== Draw 4 ===
Team	Final
France (Boan)	3
Switzerland (Rizzi)	12

Team	Final
Canada (Ursel)	7
Denmark (Stjerne)	3

Team	Final
Italy (Dal Molin)	3
United States (Roberts)	7

Team	Final
Germany (Kanz)	5
Norway (Sørum)	6

Team	Final
Sweden (Kamp)	12
Scotland (Horton)	1

=== Draw 5 ===
Team	Final
Germany (Kanz)	3
United States (Roberts)	6

Team	Final
Italy (Dal Molin)	5
Norway (Sørum)	6

Team	Final
France (Boan)	4
Scotland (Horton)	5

Team	Final
Sweden (Kamp)	7
Canada (Ursel)	4

Team	Final
Denmark (Stjerne)	4
Switzerland (Rizzi)	7

=== Draw 6 ===
Team	Final
Sweden (Kamp)	7
Denmark (Stjerne)	2

Team	Final
Switzerland (Rizzi)	9
Germany (Kanz)	8

Team	Final
Canada (Ursel)	5
Norway (Sørum)	6

Team	Final
Italy (Dal Molin)	8
France (Boan)	4

Team	Final
Scotland (Horton)	7
United States (Roberts)	2

=== Draw 7 ===
Team	Final
Switzerland (Rizzi)	7
Italy (Dal Molin)	9

Team	Final
United States (Roberts)	2
Sweden (Kamp)	8

Team	Final
Denmark (Stjerne)	2
Germany (Kanz)	6

Team	Final
Canada (Ursel)	5
Scotland (Horton)	4

Team	Final
Norway (Sørum)	12
France (Boan)	3

=== Draw 8 ===
Team	Final
Canada (Ursel)	5
France (Boan)	4

Team	Final
Italy (Dal Molin)	3
Scotland (Horton)	8

Team	Final
United States (Roberts)	7
Switzerland (Rizzi)	5

Team	Final
Norway (Sørum)	7
Denmark (Stjerne)	1

Team	Final
Germany (Kanz)	4
Sweden (Kamp)	8

=== Draw 9 ===
Team	Final
Norway (Sørum)	5
Scotland (Horton)	6

Team	Final
Denmark (Stjerne)	0
United States (Roberts)	8

Team	Final
Germany (Kanz)	11
France (Boan)	8

Team	Final
Switzerland (Rizzi)	2
Sweden (Kamp)	8

Team	Final
Italy (Dal Molin)	4
Canada (Ursel)	10

== Playoffs ==
Semi-final
3	Scotland	5
2	Canada	8
4	United States	0
1	Sweden	5

Final
1	Sweden	8
2	Canada	5

=== Semifinals ===
Team	Final
Scotland (Horton)	5
Canada (Ursel)	8

Team	Final
United States (Roberts)	0
Sweden (Kamp)	5

=== Final ===
Team	Final
Canada (Ursel)	5
Sweden (Kamp)	8

1977 Air Canada Silver Broom
(Sweden)
Sweden
2nd title
