= Richard Harding (curler) =

Scottish curler

- Curler ♂

Team
- Curling club: Carmunnock & Rutherglen CC, Glasgow, Forest Hills Trossachs CC, Kinlochard

Curling career
- Member Association: Scotland
- World Championship: 2 (1977, 1987)
- European Championship: 1 (1977)
Medal record
Curling
World Championship
Bronze medal – third place	1977 Karlstad
European Championship
Silver medal – second place	1977 Oslo
Scottish Men's Championship
Gold medal – first place	1977
Gold medal – first place	1987

Richard Harding (born c. 1956) is a Scottish curler. Harding is currently the Head of Broadcast for the World Curling Federation (WCF) and was the Equipment and Logistics Officer for the WCF.

He is a 1977 World Men's bronze medallist and a two-time Scottish men's champion.

At the time of the 1987 World Championship, he worked as a leisure manager, which among other things involved making curling ice at his Forest Hills Curling Club. He also worked as a curling reporter for the Glasgow Herald, Dundee Courier, the Aberdeen Press and Journal and for the BBC.

== Teams ==
Season	Skip	Third	Second	Lead	Events
1976–77	Ken Horton	Willie Jamieson	Keith Douglas	Richard Harding	SMCC 1977 (gold); WCC 1977 (bronze)
1977–78	Ken Horton	Willie Jamieson	Keith Douglas	Richard Harding	ECC 1977 (silver)
1986–87	Grant McPherson	Hammy McMillan	Bobby Wilson	Richard Harding	SMCC 1987 (gold); WCC 1987 (8th)
