= Morten Sørum =

Norwegian curler

- Curler

Curling career
- Member Association: Norway
- World Championship: 2 (1978, 1979)
- European Championship: 1 (1976)
Medal record
Representing Norway
Men's Curling
World Championships
Gold medal – first place	1979 Berne
Silver medal – second place	1978 Winnipeg
European Championships
Silver medal – second place	1976 West Berlin

Morten Sørum (born 1953 or 1954) is a Norwegian curler and World Champion. He was a member of the winning team at the 1979 World Curling Championships, where the team was skipped by Kristian Sørum, and also included Eigil Ramsfjell and Gunnar Meland.
