= Ken Horton (curler) =

Scottish male curler and coach

- Curler ♂

Team
- Curling club: Carmunnock & Rutherglen CC, Glasgow, Magnum CC, Irvine

Curling career
- Member Association: Scotland (1976-2024); England (2024-Present)
- World Championship: 3 (1977, 1983, 1989)
- European Championship: 1 (1977)
- Other appearances: World Junior Championships: 1 (1976), World Senior Championships: 3 (2008, 2011, 2025)
Medal record
Curling
World Championship
Bronze medal – third place	1977 Karlstad
European Championship
Silver medal – second place	1977 Oslo
Scottish Men's Championship
Gold medal – first place	1977
Gold medal – first place	1983
Gold medal – first place	1989

Ken Horton is a Scottish and English curler and curling coach.

He is a 1977 World Men's bronze medallist and three-time Scottish men's champion.

== Teams ==
Season	Skip	Third	Second	Lead	Alternate	Coach	Events
1975–76	Robert Kelly	Ken Horton	Willie Jamieson	Keith Douglas			SJCC 1976 (gold); WJCC 1976 (4th)
1976–77	Ken Horton	Willie Jamieson	Keith Douglas	Richard Harding			SMCC 1977 (gold); WCC 1977 (bronze)
1977–78	Ken Horton	Willie Jamieson	Keith Douglas	Richard Harding			ECC 1977 (silver)
1982–83	Graeme Adam	Ken Horton	Andrew McQuistin	Bob Cowan			SMCC 1983 (gold); WCC 1983 (5th)
1988–89	Graeme Adam	Ken Horton	Andrew McQuistin	Robin Copland			SMCC 1989 (gold); WCC 1989 (5th)
2007–08	Graeme Adam	Ken Horton	Stuart Naismith	Allan MacLennan	Jim Jamieson		SSCC 2008 (gold); WSCC 2008 (4th)
2008–09	Graeme Adam	Ken Horton	Stuart Naismith	Allan MacLennan			
2010–11	Ken Horton	Gordon Butler	Angus Storrie	Edmond Binks		Jim Jamieson	SSCC 2011 (gold); WSCC 2011 (7th)

== Record as a coach of national teams ==
Year	Tournament, event	National team	Place
2017	2017 European Curling Championships	England (men)	19
