= Kristian Sørum =

Norwegian male curler and coach

- Curler

Curling career
- Member Association: Norway
- World Championship: 7 (1976, 1977, 1978, 1979, 1980, 1981, 1985)
- European Championship: 5 (1976, 1979, 1980, 1983, 1984)
Medal record
Representing Norway
Men's Curling
World Championships
Gold medal – first place	1979 Berne
Silver medal – second place	1978 Winnipeg
Silver medal – second place	1980 Moncton
European Championships
Silver medal – second place	1976 West Berlin
Silver medal – second place	1980 Copenhagen
Silver medal – second place	1983 Västerås
Bronze medal – third place	1979 Varese
Bronze medal – third place	1984 Morzine

Kristian Sørum (born 1951 or 1952) is a Norwegian curler and World Champion. He was skip for the winning team at the 1979 World Curling Championships, the rest of the team consisting of Morten Sørum, Eigil Ramsfjell and Gunnar Meland.
