= 1977 European Curling Championships =

- Host city: Oslo, Norway
- Arena: Askerhallen
- Dates: November 22–26
- Men's winner: Sweden
- Curling club: Härnösands CK, Härnösand
- Skip: Ragnar Kamp
- Third: Björn Rudström
- Second: Håkan Rudström
- Lead: Christer Mårtensson
- Finalist: Scotland (Ken Horton)
- Women's winner: Sweden
- Curling club: Örebro DCK, Örebro
- Skip: Elisabeth Branäs
- Third: Eva Rosenhed
- Second: Britt-Marie Ericson
- Lead: Anne-Marie Ericsson
- Finalist: Switzerland (Nicole Zloczower)

The 1977 European Curling Championships were held from November 22 to 26 at the Askerhallen arena in Oslo, Norway.

The Swedish men's team won their first European title, and the Swedish women's team won their second European title.

For the first time, the Dutch men's team took part in the European Championship.

== Men's ==
=== Teams ===
Team	Skip	Third	Second	Lead	Curling club
Denmark	Jørn Blach	Freddy Bartelsen	Bent Jørgensen	Antonny Hinge	Hvidovre Curling Club, Hvidovre
England	Ronald D. Thornton	John D. Kerr	Tony Atherton	Tony Fraser	
France	André Tronc	Jean-Louis Sibuet	Gaby Ronchis	Jean-Francois Orset	Mont d'Arbois Curling Club, Megève
Germany	Hans Jörg Herberg	Sigi Heinle	Wolfgang Metzeler	Franz Schmidt	
Italy	Giuseppe Dal Molin	Giancarlo Valt	Enea Pavani	Ivo Lorenzi	Tofane Curling Club, Cortina d’Ampezzo
Netherlands	Eric Harmsen	Robert Harmsen	Jack De Meyere	Arthur Taudin-Scabot	
Norway	Sjur Loen	Morten Søgaard	Dagfinn Loen	Roar Rise	Brumunddal Curling Club, Oslo
Scotland	Ken Horton	Willie Jamieson	Keith Douglas	Richard Harding	Carmunnock & Rutherglen CC, Glasgow
Sweden	Ragnar Kamp	Björn Rudström	Håkan Rudström	Christer Mårtensson	Härnösands Curlingklubb, Härnösand
Switzerland	Paul Hofer	Dieter Kraft	Walter Glaser	Bruno Schallberger	

=== Round robin ===
	Team	A1	A2	A3	A4	A5	A6	A7	A8	A9	A10	W	L	Place
A1	Denmark	*	16:3	2:10	10:3	6:7	11:3	5:7	5:7	5:11	5:12	3	6	8
A2	England	3:16	*	9:6	3:9	6:9	11:4	4:18	3:18	3:15	6:10	2	7	9
A3	France	10:2	6:9	*	6:7	7:8	12:4	7:4	6:12	5:12	8:7	4	5	6
A4	Germany	3:10	9:3	7:6	*	8:1	9:1	4:2	2:8	1:6	4:3	6	3	3
A5	Italy	7:6	9:6	8:7	1:8	*	12:4	10:7	2:8	3:11	5:8	5	4	4
A6	Netherlands	3:11	4:11	4:12	1:9	4:12	*	3:5	3:15	5:18	6:15	0	9	10
A7	Norway	7:5	18:4	4:7	2:4	7:10	5:3	*	10:4	6:7	8:5	5	4	5
A8	Scotland	7:5	18:3	12:6	8:2	8:2	15:3	4:10	*	3:5	8:5	7	2	2
A9	Sweden	11:5	15:3	12:5	6:1	11:3	18:5	7:6	5:3	*	10:7	9	0	1
A10	Switzerland	12:5	10:6	7:8	3:4	8:5	15:6	5:8	5:8	7:10	*	4	5	7

=== Final standings ===
Place	Team	Skip	GP	W	L
1st place, gold medalist(s)	Sweden	Ragnar Kamp	9	9	0
2nd place, silver medalist(s)	Scotland	Ken Horton	9	7	2
3rd place, bronze medalist(s)	Germany	Hans Jörg Herberg	9	6	3
4	Italy	Giuseppe Dal Molin	9	5	4
5	Norway	Sjur Loen	9	5	4
6	France	André Tronc	9	4	5
7	Switzerland	Paul Hofer	9	4	5
8	Denmark	Jørn Blach	9	3	6
9	England	Ronald D. Thornton	9	2	7
10	Netherlands	Eric Harmsen	9	0	9

== Women's ==
=== Teams ===
Team	Skip	Third	Second	Lead	Curling club
England	Janette Forrest	Enid Logan	Mary Aitchison	Dorothy Shell	
France	Paulette Delachat	Suzanne Parodi	Erna Gay	Francoise Duclos	
Germany	Renate Grüner	Valentina Fischer-Weppler	Irmi Wagner	Traudl Krämer	
Italy	Maria-Grazzia Constantini	Tea Valt	Ann Lacedelli	Marina Pavani	
Norway	Bente Hoel (fourth)	Herborg Pettersen	Åse Wilhelmsen	Anne Sofie Bjaanaes (skip)	
Scotland	Betty Law	Bea Dodds	Margaret Paterson	Margaret Cadzow	
Sweden	Elisabeth Branäs	Eva Rosenhed	Britt-Marie Ericson	Anne-Marie Ericsson	Örebro DCK, Örebro
Switzerland	Nicole Zloczower	Rose Marie Steffen	Ebe Beyeler	Nelly Moser	

=== Round robin ===
	Team	A1	A2	A3	A4	A5	A6	A7	A8	W	L	Place
A1	England	*	4:15	8:6	2:13	10:9	6:5	5:15	4:9	3	4	5
A2	France	15:4	*	6:11	11:10	13:7	6:7	4:9	8:10	3	4	4
A3	Germany	6:8	11:6	*	8:9	5:9	6:10	7:9	2:15	1	6	8
A4	Italy	13:2	10:11	9:8	*	7:8	7:9	3:8	2:10	2	5	7
A5	Norway	9:10	7:13	9:5	8:7	*	3:16	2:11	5:7	2	5	6
A6	Scotland	5:6	7:6	10:6	9:7	16:3	*	4:6	8:10	4	3	3
A7	Sweden	15:5	9:4	9:7	8:3	11:2	6:4	*	7:4	7	0	1
A8	Switzerland	9:4	10:8	15:2	10:2	7:5	10:8	4:7	*	6	1	2

=== Final standings ===
Place	Team	Skip	GP	W	L
1st place, gold medalist(s)	Sweden	Elisabeth Branäs	7	7	0
2nd place, silver medalist(s)	Switzerland	Nicole Zloczower	7	6	1
3rd place, bronze medalist(s)	Scotland	Betty Law	7	4	3
4	France	Paulette Delachat	7	3	4
5	England	Janette Forrest	7	3	4
6	Norway	Anne Sofie Bjaanaes	7	2	5
7	Italy	Maria-Grazzia Constantini	7	2	5
8	Germany	Renate Grüner	7	1	6
