= 1976 European Curling Championships =

- Host city: West Berlin
- Arena: Eissporthalle
- Dates: December 1–5
- Men's winner: Switzerland
- Curling club: Dübendorf CC, Dübendorf
- Skip: Peter Attinger Jr.
- Third: Bernhard Attinger
- Second: Mattias Neuenschwander
- Lead: Ruedi Attinger
- Finalist: Norway (Kristian Sørum)
- Women's winner: Sweden
- Curling club: Örebro DCK, Örebro
- Skip: Elisabeth Branäs
- Third: Elisabeth Högström
- Second: Eva Rosenhed
- Lead: Anne-Marie Ericsson
- Finalist: France (Paulette Delachat)

The 1976 European Curling Championships were held from December 1 to 5 at the Eissporthalle arena in West Berlin.

The Swiss men's team won their first European title and the Swedish women's team won their first European title.

For the first time, the English men's and women's teams took part in the European Championship.

== Men's ==
=== Teams ===
| Team | Skip | Third | Second | Lead | Curling club |
|---|---|---|---|---|---|
| Denmark | John Olsen | John Christiansen | Jørn Blach | Peter Haase | Hvidovre Curling Club, Hvidovre |
| England | Ronald D. Thornton | Kenneth Duncan | John D. Kerr | Barry Nevett | |
| France | Pierre Boan | André Mabboux | Pierre Duclos | Georges Panisset | Mont d'Arbois Curling Club, Megève |
| Germany | Klaus Kanz | Manfred Schulze | Hans Österreicher | Eckart Jahn | EC Bad Tölz, Bad Tölz |
| Italy | Giuseppe Dal Molin | Andrea Pavani | Enea Pavani | Giorgio Vani | Cortina Curling Club, Cortina d’Ampezzo |
| Norway | Kristian Sørum | Morten Sørum | Gunnar Meland | Gunnar Sigstadstø | Trondheim Curling Club, Trondheim |
| Scotland | Jim Steele | Lockhart Steele | Ian Fairbairn | Jon Veitch | |
| Sweden | Jens Håkansson | Thomas Håkansson | Per Lindeman | Lars Lindgren | Karlstads Curlingklubb, Karlstad |
| Switzerland | Peter Attinger Jr. | Bernhard Attinger | Mattias Neuenschwander | Ruedi Attinger | Dübendorf CC, Dübendorf |

=== Round robin ===
| | Team | A1 | A2 | A3 | A4 | A5 | A6 | A7 | A8 | A9 | W | L | Place |
|---|---|---|---|---|---|---|---|---|---|---|---|---|---|
| A1 | Denmark | * | 12:8 | 5:12 | 8:5 | 7:8 | 4:13 | 8:2 | 7:9 | 3:4 | 3 | 5 | 6 |
| A2 | England | 8:12 | * | 3:10 | 6:7 | 5:8 | 7:10 | 2:8 | 4:15 | 2:13 | 0 | 8 | 9 |
| A3 | France | 12:5 | 10:3 | * | 10:3 | 8:7 | 2:7 | 2:10 | 1:12 | 5:10 | 4 | 4 | 5 |
| A4 | Germany | 5:8 | 7:6 | 3:10 | * | 7:5 | 4:7 | 5:8 | 4:12 | 4:10 | 2 | 6 | 7 |
| A5 | Italy | 8:7 | 8:5 | 7:8 | 5:7 | * | 3:10 | 5:9 | 3:13 | 4:10 | 2 | 6 | 8 |
| A6 | Norway | 13:4 | 10:7 | 7:2 | 7:4 | 10:3 | * | 2:4 | 10:4 | 9:6 | 7 | 1 | 1 |
| A7 | Scotland | 2:8 | 8:2 | 10:2 | 8:5 | 9:5 | 4:2 | * | 7:10 | 4:12 | 5 | 3 | 4 |
| A8 | Sweden | 9:7 | 15:4 | 12:1 | 12:4 | 13:3 | 4:10 | 10:7 | * | 7:8 | 6 | 2 | 3 |
| A9 | Switzerland | 4:3 | 13:2 | 10:5 | 10:4 | 10:4 | 6:9 | 12:4 | 8:7 | * | 7 | 1 | 2 |

Teams to playoffs

=== Playoffs ===
Semifinals
2 | Switzerland | 11
3 | Sweden | 7
1 | Norway | 8
4 | Scotland | 7

Filal
Switzerland | 9
Norway | 6

=== Final standings ===
| Place | Team | Skip | GP | W | L |
|---|---|---|---|---|---|
| 1st place, gold medalist(s) | Switzerland | Peter Attinger Jr. | 10 | 9 | 1 |
| 2nd place, silver medalist(s) | Norway | Kristian Sørum | 10 | 8 | 2 |
| 3rd place, bronze medalist(s) | Scotland | Jim Steele | 9 | 5 | 4 |
| 3rd place, bronze medalist(s) | Sweden | Jens Håkansson | 9 | 6 | 3 |
| 5 | France | Pierre Boan | 8 | 4 | 4 |
| 6 | Denmark | John Olsen | 8 | 3 | 5 |
| 7 | Germany | Klaus Kanz | 8 | 2 | 6 |
| 8 | Italy | Giuseppe Dal Molin | 8 | 2 | 6 |
| 9 | England | Ronald D. Thornton | 8 | 0 | 8 |

== Women's ==
=== Teams ===
| Team | Skip | Third | Second | Lead | Curling club |
|---|---|---|---|---|---|
| England | Connie Miller | Susan Hinds | Christine Black | Freda Fischer | |
| France | Paulette Delachat | Suzanne Parodi | Erna Gay | Francoise Duclos | |
| Germany | Sibylle Pokorn | Helena Ruff | Gisela Tappeser | Bronia Kornecki | |
| Italy | Maria-Grazzia Constantini | Tea Valt | Ann Lacedelli | Marina Pavani | |
| Norway | Eli Kolstad | Ellen Christensen | Heidi Wanggard | Kirsten Vaule | |
| Scotland | Sandra South | Sheena Hay | Margareth Ross | Elisabeth Manson | |
| Sweden | Elisabeth Branäs | Elisabeth Högström | Eva Rosenhed | Anne-Marie Ericsson | Örebro DCK, Örebro |
| Switzerland | Ulrica Baer | Mengia Baumgartner | Regula Suter | Melanie Bischof | |

=== Round robin ===
| | Team | A1 | A2 | A3 | A4 | A5 | A6 | A7 | A8 | W | L | Place |
|---|---|---|---|---|---|---|---|---|---|---|---|---|
| A1 | England | * | 3:13 | 12:6 | 10:8 | 11:2 | 5:8 | 4:12 | 9:7 | 4 | 3 | 4 |
| A2 | France | 13:3 | * | 9:8 | 9:6 | 12:4 | 6:11 | 8:5 | 7:8 | 5 | 2 | 3 |
| A3 | Germany | 6:12 | 8:9 | * | 10:4 | 8:6 | 7:4 | 4:10 | 7:8 | 3 | 4 | 6 |
| A4 | Italy | 8:10 | 6:9 | 4:10 | * | 8:13 | 4:15 | 4:10 | 4:10 | 0 | 7 | 8 |
| A5 | Norway | 2:11 | 4:12 | 6:8 | 13:8 | * | 5:12 | 2:11 | 2:9 | 1 | 6 | 7 |
| A6 | Scotland | 8:5 | 11:6 | 4:7 | 15:4 | 12:5 | * | 3:14 | 11:4 | 5 | 2 | 2 |
| A7 | Sweden | 12:4 | 5:8 | 10:4 | 10:4 | 11:2 | 14:3 | * | 10:8 | 6 | 1 | 1 |
| A8 | Switzerland | 7:9 | 8:7 | 8:7 | 10:4 | 9:2 | 4:11 | 8:10 | * | 4 | 3 | 5 |

Teams to playoffs

=== Playoffs ===
Semifinals
1 | Sweden | 13
4 | England | 2
2 | Scotland | 2
3 | France | 13

Final
Sweden | 13
France | 4

=== Final standings ===
| Place | Team | Skip | GP | W | L |
|---|---|---|---|---|---|
| 1st place, gold medalist(s) | Sweden | Elisabeth Branäs | 9 | 8 | 1 |
| 2nd place, silver medalist(s) | France | Paulette Delachat | 9 | 6 | 3 |
| 3rd place, bronze medalist(s) | England | Connie Miller | 8 | 4 | 4 |
| 3rd place, bronze medalist(s) | Scotland | Sandra South | 8 | 5 | 3 |
| 5 | Switzerland | Ulrica Baer | 7 | 4 | 3 |
| 6 | Germany | Sibylle Pokorn | 7 | 3 | 4 |
| 7 | Norway | Eli Kolstad | 7 | 1 | 6 |
| 8 | Italy | Maria-Grazzia Constantini | 7 | 0 | 7 |
