= 1975 European Curling Championships =

The 1975 European Curling Championships were held at the Palais des Sports in Megève, France from 11 to 14 December.

== Men's ==
=== Final rankings ===
Rank	Country
1	Norway
2	Sweden
3	Scotland
4	Germany
5	Switzerland
6	France
7	Denmark
8	Italy

== Women's ==
=== Final rankings ===
Rank	Country
1	Scotland
2	Sweden
3	Switzerland
4	France
5	Norway
6	Italy
7	Germany
