= European Curling Championships =

International curling tournament

- Established: 1975
- 2026 host city: Ostrava, Czech Republic
- 2026 arena: RT Torax Arena

Current champions (2026)
- Men: Scotland
- Women: Sweden

Current edition
- 2026 European Curling Championships

The European Curling Championships are annual curling tournaments held in Europe between various European nations. The European Curling Championships are usually held in early to mid December. The tournament also acts as a qualifier for the World Championships, where the top eight nations qualify. Starting in the 2026–27 curling season, the event changed into a standalone event, where the top 12 European member associations in previous season’s World Championships qualify.

In November 1974, a six-nations tournament was held in Zürich, Switzerland which included Switzerland, Sweden, Germany, France, Italy, and Norway. In March 1975, it was decided that the championships would be competed in December. At the semi-annual general meeting in Gävle, Sweden in April 2004, a new competition called the European Mixed Curling Championships was formed.

== Results ==
Name of skip listed below country.

=== Men's ===
Year	Location	Final			Third Place Match
Year	Location	Champion	Score	Second Place	Third Place	Score	Fourth Place
1975	(France) Megève	Norway; Knut Bjaanaes	7–6	Sweden; Kjell Oscarius	Scotland; Ken Marwick	–	West Germany; Klaus Kanz
1976	(West Germany) West Berlin	Switzerland; Peter Attinger Jr.	9–6	Norway; Kristian Sørum	Sweden; Jens Håkansson Scotland; Jim Steele	–	–
1977	(Norway) Oslo	Sweden; Ragnar Kamp	–	Scotland; Ken Horton	West Germany; Hans Jörg Herberg	–	Italy; Giuseppe Dal Molin
1978	(Scotland) Aviemore	Switzerland; Jürg Tanner	6–5	Sweden; Bertil Timan	Denmark; Tommy Stjerne	–	Scotland; James Sanderson
1979	(Italy) Varese	Scotland; Jimmy Waddell	8–7	Sweden; Jan Ullsten	Italy; Giuseppe Dal Molin Norway; Kristian Sørum	–	–
1980	(Denmark) Copenhagen	Scotland; Barton Henderson	6–4	Norway; Kristian Sørum	Sweden; Anders Eriksson	–	France; Claude Feige
1981	(Switzerland) Grindelwald	Switzerland; Jürg Tanner	8–6	Sweden; Göran Roxin	Denmark; Per Berg	10–4	West Germany; Keith Wendorf
1982	(Scotland) Kirkcaldy	Scotland; Mike Hay	6–5	West Germany; Keith Wendorf	Switzerland; Jürg Tanner	4–3	Denmark; Frants Gufler
1983	(Sweden) Västerås	Switzerland; Amédéé Biner	11–2	Norway; Kristian Sørum	Scotland; Mike Hay	8–3	Sweden; Inge Granback
1984	(France) Morzine	Switzerland; Peter Attinger Jr.	10–3	Scotland; Peter Wilson	Norway; Kristian Sørum	9–1	West Germany; Keith Wendorf
1985	(Switzerland) Grindelwald	West Germany; Rodger Gustaf Schmidt	7–5	Sweden; Per Lindeman	Norway; Eigil Ramsfjell	5–4	Denmark; Tommy Stjerne
1986	(Denmark) Copenhagen	Switzerland; Felix Luchsinger	8–7	Sweden; Göran Roxin	Norway; Tormod Andreassen	9–4	Italy; Andrea Pavani
1987	(West Germany) Oberstdorf	Sweden; Thomas Norgren	5–4	Norway; Eigil Ramsfjell	Switzerland; Dieter Wüest	5–4	West Germany; Keith Wendorf
1988	(Scotland) Perth	Scotland; David Smith	6–3	Norway; Eigil Ramsfjell	Switzerland; Bernhard Attinger	5–2	Sweden; Claes Roxin
1989	(Switzerland) Engelberg	Scotland; Hammy McMillan	5–4	Norway; Eigil Ramsfjell	West Germany; Keith Wendorf	6–5	France; Dominique Dupont-Roc
1990	(Norway) Lillehammer	Sweden; Mikael Hasselborg	9–7	Scotland; Robin Gray	Norway; Eigil Ramsfjell	6–5	England; John Deakin
1991	(France) Chamonix	Germany; Roland Jentsch	4–3	Scotland; David Smith	Switzerland; Daniel Model	9–8	Sweden; Per Hedén
1992	(Scotland) Perth	Germany; Andy Kapp	4–3	Sweden; Per Carlsén	Switzerland; Urs Dick Scotland; David Smith	–	–
1993	(Switzerland) Leukerbad	Norway; Eigil Ramsfjell	7–6	Denmark; Tommy Stjerne	Switzerland; Markus Eggler	7–6	Scotland; Hammy McMillan
1994	(Sweden) Sundsvall	Scotland; Hammy McMillan	4–2	Switzerland; Hansjörg Lips	Sweden; Mikael Hasselborg	9–6	Norway; Eigil Ramsfjell
1995	(Switzerland) Grindelwald	Scotland; Hammy McMillan	4–2	Switzerland; André Flotron	Norway; Eigil Ramsfjell	9–1	Italy; Claudio Pescia
1996	(Denmark) Copenhagen	Scotland; Hammy McMillan	10–3	Sweden; Lars-Åke Nordström	Switzerland; Felix Luchsinger	8–7	Germany; Daniel Herberg
1997	(Germany) Füssen	Germany; Andy Kapp	10–5	Denmark; Ulrik Schmidt	Scotland; Douglas Dryburgh	6–5	Sweden; Peja Lindholm
1998	(Switzerland) Flims	Sweden; Peja Lindholm	6–5	Scotland; Gordon Muirhead	Norway; Tormod Andreassen	6–5	Finland; Markku Uusipaavalniemi
1999	(France) Chamonix	Scotland; Hammy McMillan	6–5	Denmark; Ulrik Schmidt	Finland; Markku Uusipaavalniemi	9–4	Switzerland; Patrick Hürlimann
2000	(Germany) Oberstdorf	Finland; Markku Uusipaavalniemi	8–7	Denmark; Ulrik Schmidt	Sweden; Peja Lindholm	10–7	Switzerland; Andreas Schwaller
2001	(Finland) Vierumäki	Sweden; Peja Lindholm	5–4	Switzerland; Andreas Schwaller	Finland; Markku Uusipaavalniemi	6–4	Norway; Pål Trulsen
2002	(Switzerland) Grindelwald	Germany; Sebastian Stock	7–6	Sweden; Peja Lindholm	Norway; Thomas Ulsrud	9–5	Finland; Markku Uusipaavalniemi
2003	(Italy) Courmayeur	Scotland; David Murdoch	11–5	Sweden; Peja Lindholm	Denmark; Ulrik Schmidt	9–8	Switzerland; Bernhard Werthemann
2004	(Bulgaria) Sofia	Germany; Sebastian Stock	8–7	Sweden; Peja Lindholm	Norway; Pål Trulsen	8–2	Scotland; David Murdoch
2005	(Germany) Garmisch-Partenkirchen	Norway; Pål Trulsen	9–4	Sweden; Peja Lindholm	Scotland; David Murdoch	7–5	Switzerland; Ralph Stöckli
2006	(Switzerland) Basel	Switzerland; Andreas Schwaller	7–6	Scotland; David Murdoch	Sweden; Per Carlsén	–	Germany; Sebastian Stock
2007	(Germany) Füssen	Scotland; David Murdoch	5–3	Norway; Thomas Ulsrud	Denmark; Johnny Frederiksen	–	Switzerland; Toni Müller
2008	(Sweden) Örnsköldsvik	Scotland; David Murdoch	7–6	Norway; Thomas Ulsrud	Germany; Andy Kapp	–	Switzerland; Stefan Karnusian
2009	(Scotland) Aberdeen	Sweden; Niklas Edin	6–5	Switzerland; Ralph Stöckli	Norway; Thomas Ulsrud	–	Scotland; David Murdoch
2010	(Switzerland) Champéry	Norway; Thomas Ulsrud	5–3	Denmark; Rasmus Stjerne	Switzerland; Christof Schwaller	7–4	Germany; Andy Kapp
2011	(Russia) Moscow	Norway; Thomas Ulsrud	7–6	Sweden; Niklas Edin	Denmark; Rasmus Stjerne	9–6	Czech Republic; Jiří Snítil
2012	(Sweden) Karlstad	Sweden; Niklas Edin	8–5	Norway; Thomas Ulsrud	Czech Republic; Jiří Snítil	12–4	Denmark; Rasmus Stjerne
2013	(Norway) Stavanger	Switzerland; Sven Michel	8–6	Norway; Thomas Ulsrud	Scotland; David Murdoch	7–6	Denmark; Rasmus Stjerne
2014	(Switzerland) Champéry	Sweden; Niklas Edin	5–4	Norway; Thomas Ulsrud	Switzerland; Sven Michel	8–6	Italy; Joël Retornaz
2015	(Denmark) Esbjerg	Sweden; Niklas Edin	7–6	Switzerland; Peter de Cruz	Norway; Thomas Ulsrud	7–4	Finland; Aku Kauste
2016	(Scotland) Renfrewshire	Sweden; Niklas Edin	6–5	Norway; Thomas Ulsrud	Switzerland; Peter de Cruz	8–6	Russia; Alexey Timofeev
2017	(Switzerland) St. Gallen	Sweden; Niklas Edin	10–5	Scotland; Kyle Smith	Switzerland; Peter de Cruz	6–5	Norway; Thomas Ulsrud
2018	(Estonia) Tallinn	Scotland; Bruce Mouat	9–5	Sweden; Niklas Edin	Italy; Joël Retornaz	8–6	Germany; Marc Muskatewitz
2019	(Sweden) Helsingborg	Sweden; Niklas Edin	9–3	Switzerland; Yannick Schwaller	Scotland; Ross Paterson	7–2	Denmark; Mikkel Krause
2020	(Norway) Lillehammer	Cancelled			Cancelled
2021	(Norway) Lillehammer	Scotland; Bruce Mouat	8–5	Sweden; Niklas Edin	Italy; Joël Retornaz	10–4	Norway; Steffen Walstad
2022	(Sweden) Östersund	Scotland; Bruce Mouat	5–4	Switzerland; Yannick Schwaller	Italy; Joël Retornaz	10–7	Sweden; Oskar Eriksson
2023	(Scotland) Aberdeen	Scotland; Bruce Mouat	6–5	Sweden; Niklas Edin	Switzerland; Yannick Schwaller	8–4	Italy; Joël Retornaz
2024	(Finland) Lohja	Germany; Marc Muskatewitz	9–7	Scotland; Bruce Mouat	Norway; Magnus Ramsfjell	7–4	Switzerland; Yannick Schwaller
2025	(Finland) Lohja	Sweden; Niklas Edin	5–4	Switzerland; Yannick Schwaller	Scotland; Bruce Mouat	9–3	Italy; Joël Retornaz
2026	(Czech Republic) Ostrava	Scotland; Grant Hardie	6–5	Italy; Stefano Spiller	Sweden; Oskar Eriksson	6–4	Czech Republic; Lukáš Klíma
2027			–			–

=== Women's ===
Year	Location	Final			Third Place Match
Year	Location	Champion	Score	Second Place	Third Place	Score	Fourth Place
1975	(France) Megève	Scotland; Betty Law	–	Sweden; Elisabeth Branäs	Switzerland; Berty Schriber	–	France; Paulette Delachat
1976	(West Germany) West Berlin	Sweden; Elisabeth Branäs	13–4	France; Paulette Delachat	England; Connie Miller Scotland; Sandra South	–	–
1977	(Norway) Oslo	Sweden; Elisabeth Branäs	–	Switzerland; Nicole Zloczower	Scotland; Betty Law	–	France; Paulette Delachat
1978	(Scotland) Aviemore	Sweden; Inga Arfwidsson	11–2	Switzerland; Heidi Neuenschwander	Scotland; Isobel Torrance	–	France; Paulette Delachat
1979	(Italy) Varese	Switzerland; Gaby Casanova	9–7	Sweden; Birgitta Törn	Scotland; Beth Lindsay	–	France; Huguette Jullien
1980	(Denmark) Copenhagen	Sweden; Elisabeth Högström	10–9	Norway; Ellen Githmark	Scotland; Betty Law West Germany; Andrea Schöpp	–	–
1981	(Switzerland) Grindelwald	Switzerland; Susan Schlapbach	8–5	Sweden; Elisabeth Högström	Denmark; Helena Blach	8–4	Norway; Trine Trulsen
1982	(Scotland) Kirkcaldy	Sweden; Elisabeth Högström	13–2	Italy; Maria-Grazzia Constantini	Switzerland; Susan Schlapbach	13–3	Norway; Trine Trulsen
1983	(Sweden) Västerås	Sweden; Elisabeth Högström	4–3	Norway; Trine Trulsen	Switzerland; Erika Müller	7–6	Scotland; Isobel Torrance Jr.
1984	(France) Morzine	West Germany; Almut Hege	8–2	Sweden; Anette Norberg	Switzerland; Irene Bürgi	8–6	Italy; Maria-Grazzia Constantini
1985	(Switzerland) Grindelwald	Switzerland; Jaqueline Landolt	7–3	Scotland; Jeanette Johnston	Norway; Trine Trulsen	7–3	Denmark; Maj-Brit Rejnholdt-Christensen
1986	(Denmark) Copenhagen	West Germany; Andrea Schöpp	7–3	Switzerland; Liliane Raisin	Denmark; Maj-Brit Rejnholdt-Christensen	9–4	Scotland; Gay Deas
1987	(West Germany) Oberstdorf	West Germany; Andrea Schöpp	7–6	Sweden; Anette Norberg	Norway; Trine Trulsen	9–4	France; Agnès Mercier
1988	(Scotland) Perth	Sweden; Elisabeth Högström	5–4	Scotland; Hazel McGregor	Switzerland; Cristina Lestander	6–5	Denmark; Marianne Qvist
1989	(Switzerland) Engelberg	West Germany; Andrea Schöpp	4–2	Switzerland; Marianne Flotron	Sweden; Anette Norberg	8–5	Denmark; Helena Blach
1990	(Norway) Lillehammer	Norway; Dordi Nordby	6–4	Scotland; Hazel Erskine	Switzerland; Cristina Lestander	5–3	Germany; Andrea Schöpp
1991	(France) Chamonix	Germany; Andrea Schöpp	5–2	Norway; Trine Trulsen	Sweden; Anette Norberg	9–3	Denmark; Helena Blach
1992	(Scotland) Perth	Sweden; Elisabet Johansson	9–3	Scotland; Kirsty Hay	Germany; Andrea Schöpp Norway; Trine Trulsen	–	–
1993	(Switzerland) Leukerbad	Sweden; Elisabet Johansson	8–4	Switzerland; Diana Meichtry	Norway; Dordi Nordby	8–7	Scotland; Jackie Lockhart
1994	(Sweden) Sundsvall	Denmark; Helena Blach Lavrsen	8–4	Germany; Andrea Schöpp	Norway; Dordi Nordby	6–1	Switzerland; Graziella Grichting
1995	(Switzerland) Grindelwald	Germany; Andrea Schöpp	8–3	Scotland; Kirsty Hay	Sweden; Elisabet Gustafson	7–5	Norway; Dordi Nordby
1996	(Denmark) Copenhagen	Switzerland; Mirjam Ott	7–4	Sweden; Elisabet Gustafson	Germany; Andrea Schöpp	6–4	Scotland; Rhona Martin
1997	(Germany) Füssen	Sweden; Elisabet Gustafson	6–4	Denmark; Helena Blach Lavrsen	Germany; Andrea Schöpp	9–5	Finland; Jaana Jokela
1998	(Switzerland) Flims	Germany; Andrea Schöpp	12–4	Scotland; Rhona Martin	Denmark; Helena Blach Lavrsen	10–5	Switzerland; Nadja Heuer
1999	(France) Chamonix	Norway; Dordi Nordby	5–4	Sweden; Margaretha Lindahl	Switzerland; Luzia Ebnöther	9–5	Scotland; Rhona Martin
2000	(Germany) Oberstdorf	Sweden; Elisabet Gustafson	9–4	Norway; Dordi Nordby	Switzerland; Nadja Heuer	7–6	Germany; Andrea Schöpp
2001	(Finland) Vierumäki	Sweden; Anette Norberg	7–3	Denmark; Lene Bidstrup	Switzerland; Luzia Ebnöther	8–7	Germany; Andrea Schöpp
2002	(Switzerland) Grindelwald	Sweden; Anette Norberg	7–4	Denmark; Dorthe Holm	Norway; Dordi Nordby	9–8	Russia; Olga Jarkova
2003	(Italy) Courmayeur	Sweden; Anette Norberg	7–6	Switzerland; Luzia Ebnöther	Denmark; Dorthe Holm	5–4	Scotland; Edith Loudon
2004	(Bulgaria) Sofia	Sweden; Anette Norberg	9–4	Switzerland; Mirjam Ott	Norway; Dordi Nordby	10–7	Russia; Olga Jarkova
2005	(Germany) Garmisch-Partenkirchen	Sweden; Anette Norberg	8–5	Switzerland; Mirjam Ott	Denmark; Dorthe Holm	10–2	Norway; Dordi Nordby
2006	(Switzerland) Basel	Russia; Liudmila Privivkova	9–4	Italy; Diana Gaspari	Switzerland; Mirjam Ott	–	Scotland; Rhona Martin
2007	(Germany) Füssen	Sweden; Anette Norberg	9–4	Scotland; Kelly Wood	Denmark; Lene Nielsen	–	Switzerland; Mirjam Ott
2008	(Sweden) Örnsköldsvik	Switzerland; Mirjam Ott	5–4	Sweden; Anette Norberg	Denmark; Angelina Jensen	–	Germany; Andrea Schöpp
2009	(Scotland) Aberdeen	Germany; Andrea Schöpp	7–5	Switzerland; Mirjam Ott	Denmark; Angelina Jensen	–	Russia; Liudmila Privivkova
2010	(Switzerland) Champéry	Sweden; Stina Viktorsson	8–6	Scotland; Eve Muirhead	Switzerland; Mirjam Ott	9–5	Russia; Liudmila Privivkova
2011	(Russia) Moscow	Scotland; Eve Muirhead	8–2	Sweden; Margaretha Sigfridsson	Russia; Anna Sidorova	13–7	Denmark; Lene Nielsen
2012	(Sweden) Karlstad	Russia; Anna Sidorova	6–5	Scotland; Eve Muirhead	Sweden; Margaretha Sigfridsson	9–3	Denmark; Lene Nielsen
2013	(Norway) Stavanger	Sweden; Margaretha Sigfridsson	10–5	Scotland; Eve Muirhead	Switzerland; Mirjam Ott	6–4	Denmark; Lene Nielsen
2014	(Switzerland) Champéry	Switzerland; Binia Feltscher	8–7	Russia; Anna Sidorova	Scotland; Eve Muirhead	8–4	Denmark; Lene Nielsen
2015	(Denmark) Esbjerg	Russia; Anna Sidorova	7–6	Scotland; Eve Muirhead	Finland; Oona Kauste	7–4	Denmark; Lene Nielsen
2016	(Scotland) Renfrewshire	Russia; Victoria Moiseeva	6–4	Sweden; Anna Hasselborg	Scotland; Eve Muirhead	6–2	Czech Republic; Anna Kubešková
2017	(Switzerland) St. Gallen	Scotland; Eve Muirhead	6–3	Sweden; Anna Hasselborg	Italy; Diana Gaspari	7–6	Switzerland; Silvana Tirinzoni
2018	(Estonia) Tallinn	Sweden; Anna Hasselborg	5–4	Switzerland; Silvana Tirinzoni	Germany; Daniela Jentsch	7–4	Russia; Alina Kovaleva
2019	(Sweden) Helsingborg	Sweden; Anna Hasselborg	5–4	Scotland; Eve Muirhead	Switzerland; Silvana Tirinzoni	6–5	Russia; Alina Kovaleva
2020	(Norway) Lillehammer	Cancelled			Cancelled
2021	(Norway) Lillehammer	Scotland; Eve Muirhead	7–4	Sweden; Anna Hasselborg	Germany; Daniela Jentsch	9–6	Russia; Alina Kovaleva
2022	(Sweden) Östersund	Denmark; Madeleine Dupont	8–4	Switzerland; Silvana Tirinzoni	Scotland; Rebecca Morrison	9–5	Italy; Stefania Constantini
2023	(Scotland) Aberdeen	Switzerland; Silvana Tirinzoni	6–5	Italy; Stefania Constantini	Norway; Marianne Rørvik	10–3	Sweden; Isabella Wranå
2024	(Finland) Lohja	Switzerland; Silvana Tirinzoni	8–4	Sweden; Anna Hasselborg	Scotland; Sophie Jackson	6–4	Italy; Stefania Constantini
2025	(Finland) Lohja	Sweden; Anna Hasselborg	7–5	Scotland; Sophie Jackson	Switzerland; Corrie Hürlimann	8–4	Norway; Marianne Rørvik
2026	(Czech Republic) Ostrava	Sweden; Isabella Wranå	7–2	Switzerland; Alina Pätz	Latvia; Evelīna Barone	8–6	Scotland; Fay Henderson
2027			–			–

== All-time medal table ==
As of the 2026 European Curling Championships

=== Men ===
Rank	Nation	Gold	Silver	Bronze	Total
1	Scotland	17	8	9	34
2	Sweden	13	16	6	35
3	Switzerland	8	8	12	28
4	Germany	7	1	3	11
5	Norway	5	12	12	29
6	Finland	1	0	2	3
7	Denmark	0	5	5	10
8	Italy	0	1	4	5
9	Czech Republic	0	0	1	1
Totals (9 entries)		51	51	54	156

=== Women ===
Rank	Nation	Gold	Silver	Bronze	Total
1	Sweden	23	13	4	40
2	Switzerland	8	12	14	34
3	Germany	8	1	6	15
4	Scotland	4	13	9	26
5	Russia	4	1	1	6
6	Norway	2	4	8	14
7	Denmark	2	3	8	13
8	Italy	0	3	1	4
9	France	0	1	0	1
10	England	0	0	1	1
10	Finland	0	0	1	1
10	Latvia	0	0	1	1
Totals (12 entries)		51	51	54	156

=== Combined ===
Rank	Nation	Gold	Silver	Bronze	Total
1	Sweden	36	29	10	75
2	Scotland	21	21	18	60
3	Switzerland	16	20	26	62
4	Germany	15	2	9	26
5	Norway	7	16	20	43
6	Russia	4	1	1	6
7	Denmark	2	8	13	23
8	Finland	1	0	3	4
9	Italy	0	4	5	9
10	France	0	1	0	1
11	Czech Republic	0	0	1	1
11	England	0	0	1	1
11	Latvia	0	0	1	1
Totals (13 entries)		102	102	108	312

== Performance timeline ==
=== Men ===
==== 1975-1999 ====
Country	1970s					1980s										1990s										Years
Country	75	76	77	78	79	80	81	82	83	84	85	86	87	88	89	90	91	92	93	94	95	96	97	98	99	Years
Austria							11	11	12	14	10	9	9	9	7	12	11	16	13	12	10	9	14	16	15	19
Belgium														14	13		16		18	16	15					6
Bulgaria																	17	18	17	16	11	13	17	17	16	9
Czech Republic																14	15	14	15	15	18	16	16	8	14	10
Denmark	7	6	8	3rd place, bronze medalist(s)	6	6	3rd place, bronze medalist(s)	4	6	6	4	7	5	6	10	9	6	8	2nd place, silver medalist(s)	10	9	5	2nd place, silver medalist(s)	7	2nd place, silver medalist(s)	25
England		9	9	9	10	12	9	12	13	5	7	10	11	10	12	4	9	7	10	6	6	8	10	10	13	24
Finland							14	14	10	8	9	11	7	12	11	7	8	6	9	9	12	7	6	4	3rd place, bronze medalist(s)	19
France	6	5	6	8	8	4	5	8	8	11	11	8	12	5	4	6	5	5	6	13	8	13	11	13	7	25
Germany	4	7	3rd place, bronze medalist(s)	7	7	8	4	2nd place, silver medalist(s)	5	4	1st place, gold medalist(s)	6	4	7	3rd place, bronze medalist(s)	10	1st place, gold medalist(s)	1st place, gold medalist(s)	7	5	5	4	1st place, gold medalist(s)	6	9	25
Hungary																		18		16	19	18				4
Italy	8	8	4	6	3rd place, bronze medalist(s)	7	8	13	9	9	12	4	10	8	9	13	14	14	14	11	4	10	13	15	12	25
Liechtenstein																		12								1
Luxembourg						10	10	10	14	12	14		14				10	12	12	13	17	11	9	14	8	16
Netherlands			10	10	11	9	13	6	7	10	8	13	8	11	14	11	13	10	8	8	13	12	12	9	10	23
Norway	1st place, gold medalist(s)	2nd place, silver medalist(s)	5	5	3rd place, bronze medalist(s)	2nd place, silver medalist(s)	6	7	2nd place, silver medalist(s)	3rd place, bronze medalist(s)	3rd place, bronze medalist(s)	3rd place, bronze medalist(s)	2nd place, silver medalist(s)	2nd place, silver medalist(s)	2nd place, silver medalist(s)	3rd place, bronze medalist(s)	7	9	1st place, gold medalist(s)	4	3rd place, bronze medalist(s)	6	7	3rd place, bronze medalist(s)	5	25
Russia																		16	16	19	16	17	15	11	11	8
Scotland	3rd place, bronze medalist(s)	3rd place, bronze medalist(s)	2nd place, silver medalist(s)	4	1st place, gold medalist(s)	1st place, gold medalist(s)	7	1st place, gold medalist(s)	3rd place, bronze medalist(s)	2nd place, silver medalist(s)	6	5	6	1st place, gold medalist(s)	1st place, gold medalist(s)	2nd place, silver medalist(s)	2nd place, silver medalist(s)	3rd place, bronze medalist(s)	4	1st place, gold medalist(s)	1st place, gold medalist(s)	1st place, gold medalist(s)	3rd place, bronze medalist(s)	2nd place, silver medalist(s)	1st place, gold medalist(s)	25
Sweden	2nd place, silver medalist(s)	3rd place, bronze medalist(s)	1st place, gold medalist(s)	2nd place, silver medalist(s)	2nd place, silver medalist(s)	3rd place, bronze medalist(s)	2nd place, silver medalist(s)	5	4	7	2nd place, silver medalist(s)	2nd place, silver medalist(s)	1st place, gold medalist(s)	4	5	1st place, gold medalist(s)	4	2nd place, silver medalist(s)	5	3rd place, bronze medalist(s)	7	2nd place, silver medalist(s)	4	1st place, gold medalist(s)	6	25
Switzerland	5	1st place, gold medalist(s)	7	1st place, gold medalist(s)	5	5	1st place, gold medalist(s)	3rd place, bronze medalist(s)	1st place, gold medalist(s)	1st place, gold medalist(s)	5	1st place, gold medalist(s)	3rd place, bronze medalist(s)	3rd place, bronze medalist(s)	6	5	3rd place, bronze medalist(s)	3rd place, bronze medalist(s)	3rd place, bronze medalist(s)	2nd place, silver medalist(s)	2nd place, silver medalist(s)	3rd place, bronze medalist(s)	5	5	4	25
Wales					9	11	12	9	11	13	13	12	13	13	8	8	12	10	11	7	13	15	8	12		20

==== 2000-2025 (A division), 2026- ====
Country	2000s										2010s										2020s							Years
Country	00	01	02	03	04	05	06	07	08	09	10	11	12	13	14	15	16	17	18	19	21	22	23	24	25	26	27	Years
Austria			10														8	9						7	10	9	Q	7
Belgium																										11		1
Czech Republic		9						8	7	8	7	4	3rd place, bronze medalist(s)	7	5	9					7	7	8	8	6	4	Q	17
Denmark	2nd place, silver medalist(s)	6	5	3rd place, bronze medalist(s)	6	6	8	3rd place, bronze medalist(s)	5	7	2nd place, silver medalist(s)	3rd place, bronze medalist(s)	4	4	9		10			4	6	10			9		Q	21
England			8	10																10				10				4
Finland	1st place, gold medalist(s)	3rd place, bronze medalist(s)	4	9		8	6	9		9				10		4	9		9		10		10					14
France	7	7	9	7	10		7	7	6	5	8	8	8	9														13
Germany	6	8	1st place, gold medalist(s)	6	1st place, gold medalist(s)	5	4	5	3rd place, bronze medalist(s)	6	4	7	9		8	6	5	5	4	7	8	8	6	1st place, gold medalist(s)	5	7	Q	26
Hungary													10															1
Ireland						7	9		10																			3
Italy		10		8	5	9		10		10		10			4	8	7	8	3rd place, bronze medalist(s)	5	3rd place, bronze medalist(s)	3rd place, bronze medalist(s)	4	6	4	2nd place, silver medalist(s)	Q	20
Latvia												9		8	10													3
Luxembourg	10																											1
Netherlands	9										10					10		7	8	8	9		7	9		6	Q	11
Norway	5	4	3rd place, bronze medalist(s)	5	3rd place, bronze medalist(s)	1st place, gold medalist(s)	5	2nd place, silver medalist(s)	2nd place, silver medalist(s)	3rd place, bronze medalist(s)	1st place, gold medalist(s)	1st place, gold medalist(s)	2nd place, silver medalist(s)	2nd place, silver medalist(s)	2nd place, silver medalist(s)	3rd place, bronze medalist(s)	2nd place, silver medalist(s)	4	5	6	4	5	5	3rd place, bronze medalist(s)	8	5	Q	27
Poland																			10						7	12	Q	4
Russia					8	10					9		5	6	6	7	4	6	7	9								11
Scotland	8	5	6	1st place, gold medalist(s)	4	3rd place, bronze medalist(s)	2nd place, silver medalist(s)	1st place, gold medalist(s)	1st place, gold medalist(s)	4	5	5	7	3rd place, bronze medalist(s)	7	5	6	2nd place, silver medalist(s)	1st place, gold medalist(s)	3rd place, bronze medalist(s)	1st place, gold medalist(s)	1st place, gold medalist(s)	1st place, gold medalist(s)	2nd place, silver medalist(s)	3rd place, bronze medalist(s)	1st place, gold medalist(s)	Q	27
Slovakia																		10										1
Spain									9													9				10		3
Sweden	3rd place, bronze medalist(s)	1st place, gold medalist(s)	2nd place, silver medalist(s)	2nd place, silver medalist(s)	2nd place, silver medalist(s)	2nd place, silver medalist(s)	3rd place, bronze medalist(s)	6	8	1st place, gold medalist(s)	6	2nd place, silver medalist(s)	1st place, gold medalist(s)	5	1st place, gold medalist(s)	1st place, gold medalist(s)	1st place, gold medalist(s)	1st place, gold medalist(s)	2nd place, silver medalist(s)	1st place, gold medalist(s)	2nd place, silver medalist(s)	4	2nd place, silver medalist(s)	5	1st place, gold medalist(s)	3rd place, bronze medalist(s)	Q	27
Switzerland	4	2nd place, silver medalist(s)	7	4	7	4	1st place, gold medalist(s)	4	4	2nd place, silver medalist(s)	3rd place, bronze medalist(s)	6	6	1st place, gold medalist(s)	3rd place, bronze medalist(s)	2nd place, silver medalist(s)	3rd place, bronze medalist(s)	3rd place, bronze medalist(s)	6	2nd place, silver medalist(s)	5	2nd place, silver medalist(s)	3rd place, bronze medalist(s)	4	2nd place, silver medalist(s)	8	Q	27
Turkey																						6	9					2
Wales					9		10																					2

=== Women ===
==== 1975-1999 ====
Country	1970s					1980s										1990s										Years
Country	75	76	77	78	79	80	81	82	83	84	85	86	87	88	89	90	91	92	93	94	95	96	97	98	99	Years
Austria							9	8	14	7	7	12	7	9	12	9	9	10	10	9	8	11				16
Bulgaria																	12	14		15	15	15			14	6
Czech Republic																	13	14	14	8	10	10	9	13	12	9
Denmark				6	7	5	3rd place, bronze medalist(s)	6	8	5	4	3rd place, bronze medalist(s)	9	4	4	5	4	7	8	1st place, gold medalist(s)	5	7	2nd place, silver medalist(s)	3rd place, bronze medalist(s)	6	22
England		3rd place, bronze medalist(s)	5	8	9	11	12	10	12	8	13	11	10	8	13	13	11	8	7	11	9	13	8	9	9	24
Finland									13	14	9	10	6	12	9	7	8	5	5	10	6	6	4	7	11	17
France	4	2nd place, silver medalist(s)	4	4	4	9	5	5	6	6	10	5	4	10	7	8	7	10	9	7	13	8	13	8	7	25
Germany	7	6	8	5	6	3rd place, bronze medalist(s)	6	9	7	1st place, gold medalist(s)	6	1st place, gold medalist(s)	1st place, gold medalist(s)	6	1st place, gold medalist(s)	4	1st place, gold medalist(s)	3rd place, bronze medalist(s)	6	2nd place, silver medalist(s)	1st place, gold medalist(s)	3rd place, bronze medalist(s)	3rd place, bronze medalist(s)	1st place, gold medalist(s)	5	25
Italy	6	8	7	9	5	7	10	2nd place, silver medalist(s)	9	4	8	6	12	11	8	11	10	9	11	13	12	9	11	10	10	25
Luxembourg							13	12	11	13	12								13	12	13	12	10	14		11
Netherlands						8	11	11	5	12	11	8	11	7	11	12		12	12	13	16	16	12	12	13	19
Norway	5	7	6	7	8	2nd place, silver medalist(s)	4	4	2nd place, silver medalist(s)	9	3rd place, bronze medalist(s)	9	3rd place, bronze medalist(s)	5	5	1st place, gold medalist(s)	2nd place, silver medalist(s)	3rd place, bronze medalist(s)	3rd place, bronze medalist(s)	3rd place, bronze medalist(s)	4	5	7	6	1st place, gold medalist(s)	25
Russia																				16	11	13	14	11	8	6
Scotland	1st place, gold medalist(s)	3rd place, bronze medalist(s)	3rd place, bronze medalist(s)	3rd place, bronze medalist(s)	3rd place, bronze medalist(s)	3rd place, bronze medalist(s)	7	7	4	10	2nd place, silver medalist(s)	4	8	2nd place, silver medalist(s)	6	2nd place, silver medalist(s)	5	2nd place, silver medalist(s)	4	6	2nd place, silver medalist(s)	4	6	2nd place, silver medalist(s)	4	25
Sweden	2nd place, silver medalist(s)	1st place, gold medalist(s)	1st place, gold medalist(s)	1st place, gold medalist(s)	2nd place, silver medalist(s)	1st place, gold medalist(s)	2nd place, silver medalist(s)	1st place, gold medalist(s)	1st place, gold medalist(s)	2nd place, silver medalist(s)	5	7	2nd place, silver medalist(s)	1st place, gold medalist(s)	3rd place, bronze medalist(s)	6	3rd place, bronze medalist(s)	1st place, gold medalist(s)	1st place, gold medalist(s)	5	3rd place, bronze medalist(s)	2nd place, silver medalist(s)	1st place, gold medalist(s)	5	2nd place, silver medalist(s)	25
Switzerland	3rd place, bronze medalist(s)	5	2nd place, silver medalist(s)	2nd place, silver medalist(s)	1st place, gold medalist(s)	6	1st place, gold medalist(s)	3rd place, bronze medalist(s)	3rd place, bronze medalist(s)	3rd place, bronze medalist(s)	1st place, gold medalist(s)	2nd place, silver medalist(s)	5	3rd place, bronze medalist(s)	2nd place, silver medalist(s)	3rd place, bronze medalist(s)	6	6	2nd place, silver medalist(s)	4	7	1st place, gold medalist(s)	5	4	3rd place, bronze medalist(s)	25
Wales						10	8	13	10	11	14	13	13		10	10		12		17						12

==== 2000-2025 (A division), 2026- ====
Country	2000s										2010s										2020s							Years
Country	00	01	02	03	04	05	06	07	08	09	10	11	12	13	14	15	16	17	18	19	21	22	23	24	25	26	27	Years
Austria						9		9																				2
Czech Republic			8	9	10		8	8	10			8	8	6	10		4	7	8	6	9		9		10	9		18
Denmark	6	2nd place, silver medalist(s)	2nd place, silver medalist(s)	3rd place, bronze medalist(s)	8	3rd place, bronze medalist(s)	7	3rd place, bronze medalist(s)	3rd place, bronze medalist(s)	3rd place, bronze medalist(s)	5	4	4	4	4	4	5	8	7	7	8	1st place, gold medalist(s)	7	5	5	8		26
England				10					8	10																		3
Estonia															8	9				8	10		6	9		12		7
Finland		8	9		7	10		10		8	9		10		6	3rd place, bronze medalist(s)	10		9									12
France	8		10																									2
Germany	4	4	7	7	9		5	7	4	1st place, gold medalist(s)	7	5	7	8	7	7	7	6	3rd place, bronze medalist(s)	5	3rd place, bronze medalist(s)	7	10		9	11		24
Hungary													9			10		10				9		10				5
Italy				5	6	6	2nd place, silver medalist(s)	6	5	9		6	6	10			8	3rd place, bronze medalist(s)	10		6	4	2nd place, silver medalist(s)	4	7	7		19
Latvia											8	9		7	9				5	10		10				3rd place, bronze medalist(s)		8
Lithuania																								8	8	10		3
Netherlands						7	10		9		10																	4
Norway	2nd place, silver medalist(s)	5	3rd place, bronze medalist(s)	6	3rd place, bronze medalist(s)	4	9			7	6	10		9		8	9			9		8	3rd place, bronze medalist(s)	7	4	5		19
Russia	7	7	4	8	4	8	1st place, gold medalist(s)	5	7	4	4	3rd place, bronze medalist(s)	1st place, gold medalist(s)	5	2nd place, silver medalist(s)	1st place, gold medalist(s)	1st place, gold medalist(s)	5	4	4	4							21
Scotland	5	6	6	4	5	5	4	2nd place, silver medalist(s)	6	6	2nd place, silver medalist(s)	1st place, gold medalist(s)	2nd place, silver medalist(s)	2nd place, silver medalist(s)	3rd place, bronze medalist(s)	2nd place, silver medalist(s)	3rd place, bronze medalist(s)	1st place, gold medalist(s)	6	2nd place, silver medalist(s)	1st place, gold medalist(s)	3rd place, bronze medalist(s)	5	3rd place, bronze medalist(s)	2nd place, silver medalist(s)	4		26
Sweden	1st place, gold medalist(s)	1st place, gold medalist(s)	1st place, gold medalist(s)	1st place, gold medalist(s)	1st place, gold medalist(s)	1st place, gold medalist(s)	6	1st place, gold medalist(s)	2nd place, silver medalist(s)	5	1st place, gold medalist(s)	2nd place, silver medalist(s)	3rd place, bronze medalist(s)	1st place, gold medalist(s)	5	5	2nd place, silver medalist(s)	2nd place, silver medalist(s)	1st place, gold medalist(s)	1st place, gold medalist(s)	2nd place, silver medalist(s)	5	4	2nd place, silver medalist(s)	1st place, gold medalist(s)	1st place, gold medalist(s)		26
Switzerland	3rd place, bronze medalist(s)	3rd place, bronze medalist(s)	5	2nd place, silver medalist(s)	2nd place, silver medalist(s)	2nd place, silver medalist(s)	3rd place, bronze medalist(s)	4	1st place, gold medalist(s)	2nd place, silver medalist(s)	3rd place, bronze medalist(s)	7	5	3rd place, bronze medalist(s)	1st place, gold medalist(s)	6	6	4	2nd place, silver medalist(s)	3rd place, bronze medalist(s)	5	2nd place, silver medalist(s)	1st place, gold medalist(s)	1st place, gold medalist(s)	3rd place, bronze medalist(s)	2nd place, silver medalist(s)		26
Turkey																		9			7	6	8	6	6	6		7

== Summary ==
This tables consist of only A divisions results. Part = all in A, B and C divisions.

1970-1980: A ---- 1981-2009: A / B ---- 2010-Now: A / B / C (See)

=== Men (1975-2023) ===
Source (Table):

Rank	Team	Part	M	W	L	PF	PA	PD	Points
1	Sweden	48	462	328	134	3236	2301	+935	328
2	Scotland	48	447	303	144	2971	2245	+726	303
3	Switzerland	48	454	298	156	3047	2369	+678	298
4	Norway	48	441	295	146	3101	2236	+865	295
5	Germany	48	414	226	188	2597	2405	+192	226
6	Denmark	48	381	191	190	2411	2253	+158	191
7	Italy	48	307	126	181	1803	1975	-172	126
8	France	47	304	121	183	1683	1945	-262	121
9	Finland	43	259	101	158	1425	1718	-293	101
10	England	47	199	57	142	1057	1512	-455	57
11	Netherlands	46	216	55	161	1094	1637	-543	55
12	Czech Republic	33	140	50	90	730	977	-247	50
13	Russia	29	111	43	68	609	706	-97	43
14	Austria	42	118	36	82	603	862	-259	36
15	Wales	42	132	34	98	626	1042	-416	34
16	Luxembourg	29	86	16	70	399	730	-331	16
17	Ireland	19	28	8	20	131	201	-70	8
18	Turkey	13	18	5	13	91	141	-50	5
19	Latvia	21	27	5	22	135	196	-61	5
20	Spain	21	18	2	16	78	160	-82	2
21	Bulgaria	28	7	1	6	29	60	-31	1
22	Poland	16	9	1	8	34	72	-38	1
23	Slovakia	18	9	1	8	27	76	-49	1
24	Belgium	23	12	1	11	40	107	-67	1
25	Hungary	24	9	0	9	37	68	-31	0

=== Women (1975-2023) ===
Source (Table):

Rank	Team	Part	M	W	L	PF	PA	PD	Points
1	Sweden	48	443	348	95	3500	2061	+1439	348
2	Switzerland	48	437	299	138	3278	2269	+1009	299
3	Scotland	48	439	283	156	3232	2401	+831	283
4	Germany	48	395	218	177	2731	2396	+335	218
5	Denmark	45	401	215	186	2632	2488	+144	215
6	Norway	48	350	181	169	2414	2246	+168	181
7	Russia	27	240	134	106	1618	1440	+178	134
8	Italy	48	300	116	184	1846	2211	-365	116
9	France	40	184	76	108	1226	1337	-111	76
10	Finland	40	228	74	154	1263	1757	-494	74
11	Czech Republic	32	181	46	135	934	1430	-496	46
12	Austria	36	108	39	69	591	889	-298	39
13	England	46	174	38	136	959	1633	-674	38
14	Netherlands	36	135	36	99	744	1170	-426	36
15	Wales	19	67	14	53	302	654	-352	14
16	Turkey	13	36	12	24	221	258	-37	12
17	Latvia	21	63	12	51	301	532	-231	12
18	Luxembourg	11	57	9	48	288	549	-261	9
19	Estonia	18	45	8	37	234	359	-125	8
20	Hungary	20	36	5	31	153	323	-170	5
21	Bulgaria	11	7	0	7	18	82	-64	0

== Links ==
- nl:Categorie:Nationaal curlingteam - National Curling Teams

== See also ==
- World Curling Championships
- World Qualification Event
- European Mixed Curling Championship
- European Junior Curling Challenge
- Pan Continental Curling Championships
- Pacific-Asia Curling Championships
- Americas Challenge
- World Curling Tour
- Euro Super Series
