= 1979 European Curling Championships =

- Host city: Varese, Italy
- Arena: Palaghiaccio
- Dates: November 18–24
- Men's winner: Scotland
- Curling club: Hamilton & Thornyhill CC, Hamilton
- Skip: Jimmy Waddell
- Third: Willie Frame
- Second: Jim Forrest
- Lead: George Bryan
- Finalist: Sweden (Jan Ullsten)
- Women's winner: Switzerland
- Curling club: Basel-Albeina CC, Basel
- Skip: Gaby Casanova
- Third: Betty Bourquin
- Second: Linda Thommen
- Lead: Rosi Manger
- Finalist: Sweden (Birgitta Törn)

The 1979 European Curling Championships were held from November 18 to 24 at the Palaghiaccio arena in Varese, Italy.

The Scottish men's team won their first European title, and the Swiss women's team won their first European title.

For the first time, the men's team of Wales took part in the European Championship.

== Men's ==
=== Teams ===
Team	Skip	Third	Second	Lead	Alternate	Curling club
Denmark	Per Berg	Gert Larsen	Jan Hansen	Michael Harry		Hvidovre CC, Hvidovre
England	Tony Atherton	Frank Kershaw	Tony Fraser	John D. Kerr		
France	Daniel Paris	Serge Ferracani	Joel Vantadour	Antonio Barca		
Germany	Keith Wendorf	Balint von Bery	Heino von L'Estocq	Peter Fischer-Weppler		Munchener EV, Munich
Italy	Giuseppe Dal Molin	Andrea Pavani	Giancarlo Valt	Enea Pavani		CC Tofane, Cortina d’Ampezzo
Netherlands	Eric Harmsen	Robert Harmsen	Otto Veening	Wim Neeleman		
Norway	Kristian Sørum	Eigil Ramsfjell	Gunnar Meland	Harald Ramsfjell		Bygdøy CC, Oslo
Scotland	Jimmy Waddell	Willie Frame	Jim Forrest	George Bryan		Hamilton & Thornyhill CC, Hamilton
Sweden	Jan Ullsten	Anders Thidholm	Anders Nilsson	Hans Söderström	Bertil Timan	Härnösands CK, Härnösand
Switzerland	Karl Grossman	Hans Peter Nauer	Willi Bless	Heinz Meierhofer		
Wales	John Stone	David Humphreys	Gordon Vickers	Peter Hodgkinson		

=== Round robin ===
	Team	A1	A2	A3	A4	A5	A6	A7	A8	A9	A10	A11	W	L	Place
A1	Denmark	*	9:7	6:8	1:9	8:2	10:4	6:3	7:9	7:8	3:2	6:9	5	5	6
A2	England	7:9	*	3:9	9:6	4:7	15:1	4:14	5:7	5:11	5:11	9:10	2	8	10
A3	France	8:6	9:3	*	4:9	4:10	7:9	2:9	5:7	7:4	3:10	19:3	4	6	8
A4	Germany	9:1	6:9	9:4	*	4:11	4:11	6:7	6:9	8:6	4:8	8:4	4	6	7
A5	Italy	2:8	7:4	10:4	11:4	*	14:2	6:5	6:5	5:6	3:2	16:3	8	2	2
A6	Netherlands	4:10	1:15	9:7	11:4	2:14	*	6:13	5:13	3:12	4:10	7:8	2	8	11
A7	Norway	3:6	14:4	9:2	7:6	5:6	13:6	*	7:5	5:9	4:5	15:2	6	4	4
A8	Scotland	9:7	7:5	7:5	9:6	5:6	13:5	5:7	*	5:7	9:4	14:1	7	3	3
A9	Sweden	8:7	11:5	4:7	6:8	6:5	12:3	9:5	7:5	*	8:6	9:3	8	2	1
A10	Switzerland	2:3	11:5	10:3	8:4	2:3	10:4	5:4	4:9	6:8	*	8:2	6	4	4
A11	Wales	9:6	10:9	3:19	4:8	3:16	8:7	2:15	1:14	3:9	2:8	*	3	7	9

Teams to playoffs
Teams to tiebreaker

==== Tiebreaker ====
.
Norway	11
Switzerland	5

=== Playoffs ===
Semifinals
3	Scotland	7
2	Italy	4
1	Sweden	8
4	Norway	7

Final
Scotland	8
Sweden	7

=== Final standings ===
Place	Team	Skip	GP	W	L
1st place, gold medalist(s)	Scotland	Jimmy Waddell	12	9	3
2nd place, silver medalist(s)	Sweden	Jan Ullsten	12	9	3
3rd place, bronze medalist(s)	Italy	Giuseppe Dal Molin	11	8	3
3rd place, bronze medalist(s)	Norway	Kristian Sørum	12	7	5
5	Switzerland	Karl Grossman	11	6	5
6	Denmark	Per Berg	10	5	5
7	Germany	Keith Wendorf	10	4	6
8	France	Daniel Paris	10	4	6
9	Wales	John Stone	10	3	7
10	England	Tony Atherton	10	2	8
11	Netherlands	Eric Harmsen	10	2	8

== Women's ==
=== Teams ===
Team	Skip	Third	Second	Lead	Curling club
Denmark	Birgitte Jacobsen	Jytte Berg	Karen Eriksen	Karina Blach	
England	Janette Forrest	Enid Logan	Dorothy Shell	Mary Aitchison	
France	Huguette Jullien	Suzanne Parodi	Jean Albert Sulpice (?)	Erna Gay	
Germany	Susi Kiesel	Gisela Lunz	Hildegard Meier	Trudi Benzing	
Italy	Maria-Grazzia Constantini	Tea Valt	Ann Lacedelli	Marina Pavani	
Norway	Ellen Githmark	Trine Trulsen	Ingvill Githmark	Kirsten Vaule	
Scotland	Beth Lindsay	Ann McKellar	Jeanette Johnston	May Taylor	
Sweden	Birgitta Törn	Katarina Hultling	Susanne Gynning-Ödling	Gunilla Bergman	Amatörföreningens CK, Stockholm
Switzerland	Gaby Casanova	Betty Bourquin	Linda Thommen	Rosi Manger	Basel-Albeina CC, Basel

=== Round robin ===
	Team	A1	A2	A3	A4	A5	A6	A7	A8	A9	W	L	Place
A1	Denmark	*	8:6	8:7	5:11	4:7	9:5	8:12	1:14	3:14	3	5	7
A2	England	6:8	*	4:12	6:12	9:4	1:15	5:11	4:10	3:13	1	7	9
A3	France	7:8	12:4	*	4:10	11:10	15:12	3:10	7:13	11:4	4	4	4
A4	Germany	11:5	12:6	10:4	*	5:9	6:10	7:11	4:15	8:9	3	5	6
A5	Italy	7:4	4:9	10:11	9:5	*	7:3	3:19	5:11	3:7	3	5	5
A6	Norway	5:9	15:1	12:15	10:6	3:7	*	8:12	5:7	1:12	2	6	8
A7	Scotland	12:8	11:5	10:3	11:7	19:3	12:8	*	3:5	6:13	6	2	3
A8	Sweden	14:1	10:4	13:7	15:4	11:5	7:5	5:3	*	7:5	8	0	1
A9	Switzerland	14:3	13:3	4:11	9:8	7:3	12:1	13:6	5:7	*	6	2	2

Team to final
Teams to semifinal

=== Playoffs ===
Semifinal			Final
			1	Sweden	7
2	Switzerland	5		Switzerland	9
3	Scotland	3

=== Final standings ===
Place	Team	Skip	GP	W	L
1st place, gold medalist(s)	Switzerland	Gaby Casanova	10	8	2
2nd place, silver medalist(s)	Sweden	Birgitta Törn	9	8	1
3rd place, bronze medalist(s)	Scotland	Beth Lindsay	9	6	3
4	France	Huguette Jullien	8	4	4
5	Italy	Maria-Grazzia Constantini	8	3	5
6	Germany	Susi Kiesel	8	3	5
7	Denmark	Birgitte Jacobsen	8	3	5
8	Norway	Ellen Githmark	8	2	6
9	England	Janette Forrest	8	1	7
