= Billie Sørum =

Norwegian curler

- Curler ♀
- Born: Billie Skjerpen; 13 August 1948 (age 78); Saskatoon, Saskatchewan, Bærum, Norway

Team
- Curling club: Snarøyen CC, Oslo

Curling career
- Member Association: Norway
- World Championship: 3 (1986, 1987, 1988)
- European Championship: 3 (1984, 1991, 1992)
Medal record
Curling
European Championships
Silver medal – second place	1991 Chamonix
Bronze medal – third place	1992 Perth
Norwegian Women's Championship
Gold medal – first place	1986
Gold medal – first place	1987
Gold medal – first place	1988

Billie Sørum (née Skjerpen; born 13 August 1948 in Sandvika) is a former Norwegian curler.

At the international level, she is a European silver (1991) and bronze (1992) medallist.

At the national level, she is a three-time Norwegian women's champion curler (1986, 1987, 1988).

== Teams ==
Season	Skip	Third	Second	Lead	Events
1984–85	Anne Jøtun Bakke	Hilde Jøtun	Rikke Ramsfjell	Billie Skjerpen	ECC 1984 (9th)
1985–86	Anne Jøtun Bakke	Hilde Jøtun	Trine Trulsen	Billie Skjerpen	NWCC 1986 (gold); WCC 1986 (5th)
1986–87	Anne Jøtun Bakke	Hilde Jøtun	Ingvill Githmark	Billie Sørum	NWCC 1987 (gold); WCC 1987 (4th)
1987–88	Anne Jøtun Bakke	Hilde Jøtun	Ingvill Githmark	Billie Sørum	NWCC 1988 (gold); WCC 1988 (4th)
1991–92	Trine Trulsen	Ellen Githmark	Ingvill Githmark	Billie Sørum	ECC 1991 (silver)
1992–93	Trine Trulsen	Ellen Githmark	Ingvill Githmark	Billie Sørum	ECC 1992 (bronze)
