= Arfwidsson =

Arfwidsson is a Swedish surname. Notable people with the surname include:

- Barbro Arfwidsson (born 1932), Swedish curler
- Inga Arfwidsson (born 1940), Swedish curler
- Nils Arfwidsson (1802–1880), Swedish writer, journalist, and government official
- Rolf Arfwidsson (1928–2021), Swedish curler
