= Githmark =

Githmark is a surname. Notable people with the surname include:

- Ellen Githmark, Norwegian curler
- Ingvill Githmark, Norwegian curler
- Linn Githmark (born 1982), Norwegian curler

== See also ==
- Gitmark
