= 1977 World Junior Curling Championships =

- Host city: Sainte-Foy, Quebec, Canada
- Dates: February 27 – March 3
- Men's winner: Canada (2nd title)
- Skip: Bill Jenkins
- Third: John Scales
- Second: Sandy Stewart
- Lead: Alan Mayhew
- Finalist: Sweden (Anders Grahn)

The 1977 World Junior Curling Championships were held from February 27 to March 3 at Laval University in Sainte-Foy, Quebec, Canada. The tournament only consisted of a men's event.

== Teams ==
Country	Skip	Third	Second	Lead	Curling club
Canada	Bill Jenkins	John Scales	Sandy Stewart	Alan Mayhew	
Denmark	Peter Sundberg	Lars Erik Sundberg	Holger Bo Nissen	Morten Andreasen	
France	Claude Feige	Marc Sibuet	Gilles Marin-Pache	Yves Tronc	Mont d'Arbois CC, Megève
West Germany	Ralph Zimmerman	Florian Zimmerman	Pascal Piroue	Thomas Mueller-Stoy	
Italy	Massimo Alvera	Franco Sovilla	Fabio Bovolenta	Stefano Morona	Cortina CC, Cortina d'Ampezzo
Norway	Sjur Loen	Morten Søgaard	Hans Bekkelund	Roar Rise	Brumunddal CC, Oslo
Scotland	Lockhart Steele	Gavin Wiseman	Tom McGregor	Archibald Craig	
Sweden	Anders Grahn	Mats Nyberg	Bo Söderström	Bo-Göran Strömberg	Sundsvalls CK, Sundsvall
Switzerland	Jürg Tanner	Jean Pierre Morisetti	Jürg Hornisberger	Patrik Lörtscher	Lausanne-Riviera CC
United States	Donald Barcome Jr.	Dale Mueller	Gary Mueller	Earl Barcome	Grand Forks CC, North Dakota

== Round robin ==
Place	Team	1	2	3	4	5	6	7	8	9	10	Wins	Losses
1	United States	*	10:7	8:5	7:3	8:4	8:12	9:3	8:7	9:4	9:6	8	1
2	Norway	7:10	*	9:8	5:7	7:5	7:8	10:5	10:9	7:2	11:1	6	3
3	Sweden	5:8	8:9	*	10:4	10:7	3:6	8:4	7:4	16:1	14:5	6	3
4	Canada	3:7	7:5	4:10	*	4:7	9:8	7:5	6:8	11:4	13:5	5	4
4	Switzerland	4:8	5:7	7:10	7:4	*	9:6	10:3	1:9	7:4	12:5	5	4
4	France	12:8	8:7	6:3	8:9	6:9	*	5:6	10:4	2:9	12:2	5	4
7	Scotland	3:9	5:10	4:8	5:7	3:10	6:5	*	7:4	8:6	12:4	4	5
8	Italy	7:8	9:10	4:7	8:6	9:1	4:10	4:7	*	7:6	11:7	4	5
9	Denmark	4:9	2:7	1:16	4:11	4:7	9:2	6:8	6:7	*	7:3	2	7
10	Germany	6:9	1:11	5:14	5:13	5:12	2:12	4:12	7:11	3:7	*	0	9

Teams to playoffs
Teams to tiebreaker

== Tiebreaker ==
Round 1		Round 2
		Switzerland	2
Canada	7	Canada	4
France	3

== Playoffs ==
Semifinal
1	United States	6
4	Canada	7
2	Norway	5
3	Sweden	6

Gold Medal Game
4	Canada	9
2	Sweden	5

== Final standings ==
Place	Team	Games played	Wins	Losses
1st place, gold medalist(s)	Canada	13	9	4
2nd place, silver medalist(s)	Sweden	11	7	4
3rd place, bronze medalist(s)	United States	10	8	2
4	Norway	10	6	4
5	Switzerland	10	5	5
6	France	10	5	5
7	Scotland	9	4	5
8	Italy	9	4	5
9	Denmark	9	2	7
10	Germany	9	0	9

== Awards ==
- WJCC Sportsmanship Award: (United States) Donald Barcome Jr.

All-Star Team:

- Skip: (United States) Donald Barcome Jr.
- Third: (Sweden) Mats Nyberg
- Second: (United States) Gary Mueller
- Lead: (Norway) Roar Rise
