= 1979 Royal Bank of Scotland World Women's Curling Championship =

1979 World Women's Curling Championships
- Host city: Perth, Scotland
- Arena: Perth Ice Rink
- Dates: 17–23 March 1979
- Winner: Switzerland
- Curling club: Basel-Albeina CC
- Skip: Gaby Casanova
- Third: Betty Bourquin
- Second: Linda Thommen
- Lead: Rosi Manger
- Finalist: Sweden (Birgitta Törn)

The 1979 Royal Bank of Scotland World Women's Curling Championship also known as the Women's World Invitational Curling Championship or The Royal Bank Ladies World Curling Championship was the first ever women's world championship. It was held at the Perth Ice Rink in Perth, Scotland from 17 March to 23 March 1979.

Canada and the USA joined the nine teams that played in the 1978 European Curling Championships. The Championship was won by Switzerland, who beat Sweden 13-5 in the final.

The event was billed as the women's world championship, but was not sanctioned by the International Curling Federation at the time.

== Teams ==
Canada	Denmark	England	France
North Shore WC, North Vancouver Skip: Lindsay Sparkes; Third: Dawn Knowles; Second: Robin Wilson; Lead: Lorraine Anne Bowles	Hvidovre CC, Hvidovre Skip: Iben Larsen; Third: Astrid Birnbaum; Second: Marianne Jørgensen; Lead: Helena Blach	Glendale CC, Northumberland Skip: Janette Forrest; Third: Enid Logan; Second: Mary Aitchison; Lead: Dorothy Shell	Megève CC, Megève Fourth: Erna Gay; Skip: Paulette Delachat; Second: Suzanne Parodi; Lead: Huguette Jullien
West Germany	Italy	Norway	Scotland
CC Schwenningen, Schwenningen Skip: Susi Kiesel; Third: Gisela Lunz; Second: Heidi Schapman; Lead: Trudi Benzing	Cortina CC, Cortina d'Ampezzo Skip: Nella Alvera; Third: Paola Zardini; Second: Lidia Cavallini; Lead: Loredana Da Giau	Asker CC, Oslo Skip: Ellen Githmark; Third: Eli Kolstad; Second: Kirsten Vaule; Lead: Ingvill Githmark	Ayr CC, Ayr Skip: Beth Lindsay; Third: Ann McKellar; Second: Jeanette Johnston; Lead: May Taylor
Sweden	Switzerland	United States	
Amatörföreningens CK, Stockholm Skip: Birgitta Törn; Third: Katarina Hultling; Second: Susanne Gynning-Ödling; Lead: Gunilla Bergman	Basel-Albeina CC, Basel Skip: Gaby Casanova; Third: Betty Bourquin; Second: Linda Thommen; Lead: Rosi Manger	Granidears CC, Seattle Skip: Nancy Langley; Third: Dolores Wallace; Second: Leslie Frosch; Lead: Nancy Wallace	

== Round-robin standings ==
Key
Teams to playoffs
Teams to tiebreaker

Country	Skip	W	L
Sweden	Birgitta Törn	8	2
Canada	Lindsay Sparkes	7	3
France	Paulette Delachat	7	3
Switzerland	Gaby Casanova	7	3
Scotland	Beth Lindsay	7	3
United States	Nancy Langley	7	3
Denmark	Iben Larsen	4	6
West Germany	Susi Kiesel	4	6
Norway	Ellen Githmark	3	7
Italy	Nella Alvera	1	9
England	Janette Forrest	0	10

== Results ==
=== Draw 1 ===
Sheet A	Final
Norway (Githmark)	5
West Germany (Kiesel)	17

Sheet B	Final
England (Forrest)	3
Scotland (Lindsay)	16

Sheet C	Final
France (Delachat)	3
Canada (Sparkes)	11

Sheet D	Final
United States (Langley)	6
Denmark (Larsen)	5

Sheet E	Final
Switzerland (Casanova)	18
Italy (Alvera)	1

=== Draw 2 ===
Sheet A	Final
United States (Langley)	10
Italy (Alvera)	9

Sheet B	Final
France (Delachat)	8
Sweden (Törn)	10

Sheet C	Final
England (Forrest)	7
Denmark (Larsen)	8

Sheet D	Final
Switzerland (Casanova)	9
West Germany (Kiesel)	6

Sheet E	Final
Scotland (Lindsay)	13
Norway (Githmark)	8

=== Draw 3 ===
Sheet A	Final
France (Delachat)	10
Switzerland (Casanova)	5

Sheet B	Final
United States (Langley)	8
England (Forrest)	6

Sheet C	Final
Sweden (Törn)	8
Scotland (Lindsay)	5

Sheet D	Final
Denmark (Larsen)	9
Norway (Githmark)	5

Sheet E	1	2	3	4	5	6	7	8	9	10	Final
Canada (Sparkes)	3	0	4	1	2	1	1	0	X	X	12
West Germany (Kiesel)	0	1	0	0	0	0	0	1	X	X	2

=== Draw 4 ===
Sheet A	1	2	3	4	5	6	7	8	9	10	Final
Sweden (Törn)	2	0	1	1	0	1	1	1	2	X	9
Canada (Sparkes)	0	1	0	0	2	0	0	0	0	X	3

Sheet B	Final
Scotland (Lindsay)	11
Denmark (Larsen)	2

Sheet C	Final
England (Forrest)	2
Italy (Alvera)	11

Sheet D	Final
United States (Langley)	9
West Germany (Kiesel)	8

Sheet E	Final
France (Delachat)	9
Norway (Githmark)	4

=== Draw 5 ===
Sheet A	Final
England (Forrest)	6
West Germany (Kiesel)	14

Sheet B	1	2	3	4	5	6	7	8	9	10	Final
Canada (Sparkes)	1	1	0	2	3	0	0	0	4	1	12
Switzerland (Casanova)	0	0	1	0	0	2	1	1	0	0	5

Sheet C	Final
Sweden (Törn)	7
Norway (Githmark)	3

Sheet D	Final
France (Delachat)	7
Denmark (Larsen)	5

Sheet E	Final
Scotland (Lindsay)	13
Italy (Alvera)	2

=== Draw 6 ===
Sheet A	1	2	3	4	5	6	7	8	9	10	Final
Canada (Sparkes)	0	0	0	0	0	3	2	0	0	0	5
Norway (Githmark)	0	0	1	2	0	0	0	1	0	3	7

Sheet B	Final
United States (Langley)	9
France (Delachat)	8

Sheet C	Final
Denmark (Larsen)	7
Italy (Alvera)	6

Sheet D	Final
Scotland (Lindsay)	15
West Germany (Kiesel)	6

Sheet E	Final
Sweden (Törn)	10
Switzerland (Casanova)	6

=== Draw 7 ===
Sheet A	Final
United States (Langley)	9
Sweden (Törn)	6

Sheet B	Final
Denmark (Larsen)	9
West Germany (Kiesel)	7

Sheet C	Final
Scotland (Lindsay)	4
Switzerland (Casanova)	7

Sheet D	1	2	3	4	5	6	7	8	9	10	Final
Canada (Sparkes)	1	0	1	1	0	0	0	3	0	4	10
Italy (Alvera)	0	1	0	0	1	0	1	0	3	0	6

Sheet E	Final
France (Delachat)	13
England (Forrest)	11

=== Draw 8 ===
Sheet A	Final
Italy (Alvera)	2
West Germany (Kiesel)	10

Sheet B	Final
England (Forrest)	3
Sweden (Törn)	10

Sheet C	1	2	3	4	5	6	7	8	9	10	Final
Canada (Sparkes)	0	1	0	0	0	0	1	1	0	X	3
United States (Langley)	0	0	0	0	0	0	0	0	1	X	1

Sheet D	Final
Switzerland (Casanova)	9
Norway (Githmark)	7

Sheet E	Final
France (Delachat)	10
Scotland (Lindsay)	5

=== Draw 9 ===
Sheet A	1	2	3	4	5	6	7	8	9	10	Final
Canada (Sparkes)	1	2	2	3	0	1	3	0	X	X	12
Denmark (Larsen)	0	0	0	0	1	0	0	1	X	X	2

Sheet B	Final
United States (Langley)	5
Switzerland (Casanova)	11

Sheet C	Final
France (Delachat)	14
West Germany (Kiesel)	3

Sheet D	Final
Sweden (Törn)	11
Italy (Alvera)	3

Sheet E	Final
England (Forrest)	6
Norway (Githmark))	10

=== Draw 10 ===
Sheet A	Final
United States (Langley)	6
Norway (Githmark))	2

Sheet B	Final
France (Delachat)	11
Italy (Alvera)	4

Sheet C	Final
England (Forrest)	2
Switzerland (Casanova)	11

Sheet D	1	2	3	4	5	6	7	8	9	10	Final
Scotland (Lindsay)	1	0	2	0	1	0	0	2	0	1	7
Canada (Sparkes)	0	3	0	1	0	1	0	0	1	0	6

Sheet E	Final
Sweden (Törn)	11
Denmark (Larsen)	4

=== Draw 11 ===
Sheet A	Final
Sweden (Törn)	9
West Germany (Kiesel)	11

Sheet B	Final
United States (Langley)	4
Scotland (Lindsay)	6

Sheet C	Final
Italy (Alvera)	3
Norway (Githmark)	11

Sheet D	Final
Denmark (Larsen)	5
Switzerland (Casanova)	10

Sheet E	1	2	3	4	5	6	7	8	9	10	Final
England (Forrest)	0	1	0	0	0	0	1	0	0	X	2
Canada (Sparkes)	2	0	3	2	1	2	0	1	3	X	13

== Tiebreakers ==
Sheet A	Final
Scotland (Lindsay)	6
United States (Langley)	4

Sheet B	Final
Switzerland (Casanova)	8
France (Delachat)	5

== Playoffs ==
Semi-final
1	Sweden	7
4	Scotland	5
3	Switzerland	6
2	Canada	3

Final
1	Sweden	5
3	Switzerland	13

=== Semifinals ===
Sheet B	1	2	3	4	5	6	7	8	9	10	Final
Sweden (Törn)	2	0	0	2	0	0	0	2	1	X	7
Scotland (Lindsay)	0	2	1	0	0	1	1	0	0	X	5

Sheet B	1	2	3	4	5	6	7	8	9	10	Final
Canada (Sparkes)	0	1	1	1	0	0	0	0	0	X	3
Switzerland (Casanova)	0	0	0	0	1	2	1	1	1	X	6

=== Final ===
Sheet B	1	2	3	4	5	6	7	8	9	10	Final
Sweden (Törn)	1	1	0	0	1	0	2	0	X	X	5
Switzerland (Casanova)	0	0	3	2	0	4	0	4	X	X	13

1979 Royal Bank of Scotland World Women's Curling Championship winner
(Switzerland)
Switzerland
1st title
