= Betty Bourquin =

Swiss female curler and coach

- Curler ♀
- Other names: Betty Bourquin-Steffen

Team
- Curling club: Basel-Albeina CC, Basel

Curling career
- Member Association: Switzerland
- World Championship: 1 (1979)
- European Championship: 1 (1979)
Medal record
Curling
World Championships
Gold medal – first place	1979 Perth
European Championships
Gold medal – first place	1979 Varese
Swiss Women's Championship
Gold medal – first place	1979

Betty Bourquin (in marriage also known as Betty Bourquin-Steffen) is a former Swiss female curler and curling coach. She played lead position on the Swiss rink that won the first-ever World Women's Championship in 1979 and won the 1979 European Championships.

== Teams ==
Season	Skip	Third	Second	Lead	Events
1978–79	Gaby Casanova	Betty Bourquin	Linda Thommen	Rosi Manger	SWCC 1979 (gold); WCC 1979 (gold)
1979–80	Gaby Casanova	Betty Bourquin	Linda Thommen	Rosi Manger	ECC 1979 (gold)

== Record as a coach of national teams ==
Year	Tournament, event	National team	Place
2002	2002 World Junior Curling Championships	Switzerland (junior women)	5th
