= Rosi Manger =

Swiss curler

Medal record

Representing Switzerland

Women's Curling

World championships
Gold medal – first place	1979 Perth	Team

Rosi Manger is a Swiss curler and World Champion. She won a gold medal at the 1979 World Curling Championships.

== Teammates ==
Season	Skip	Third	Second	Lead	Events
1978–79	Gaby Casanova	Betty Bourquin	Linda Thommen	Rosi Manger	SWCC 1979 (gold); WCC 1979 (gold)
1979–80	Gaby Casanova	Betty Bourquin	Linda Thommen	Rosi Manger	ECC 1979 (gold)
