= 1978 European Curling Championships =

Curling competition in Aviemore, Scotland

- Host city: Aviemore, Scotland
- Arena: Aviemore Ice Rink
- Dates: 4–9 December
- Men's winner: Switzerland
- Curling club: Lausanne-Riviera CC, Lausanne
- Skip: Jürg Tanner
- Third: Jürg Hornisberger
- Second: Franz Tanner
- Lead: Patrik Lörtscher
- Finalist: Sweden (Bertil Timan)
- Women's winner: Sweden
- Curling club: Örebro CK, Örebro
- Skip: Inga Arfwidsson
- Third: Barbro Arfwidsson
- Second: Ingrid Appelquist
- Lead: Gunvor Björhäll
- Finalist: Switzerland (Heidi Neuenschwander)

The 1978 European Curling Championships were held from 4 to 9 December at the Aviemore Ice Rink in Aviemore, Scotland.

The Swiss men's team won their second European title, and the Swedish women's team won their third European title.

== Men's ==
=== Teams ===
Team	Skip	Third	Second	Lead	Curling club
Denmark	Tommy Stjerne	Oluf Olsen	Steen Hansen	Peter Andersen	Hvidovre Curling Club, Hvidovre
England	Ronald D. Thornton	John D. Kerr	Tony Atherton	Michael Thompson	
France	Robert Thierriaz	Joel Indergand	Alain Bagnaro	Jean Louis Roux	
Germany	Hans Jörg Herberg	Franz Schmidt	Wolfgang Metzeler	Sigi Heinle	
Italy	Giuseppe Dal Molin	Enea Pavani	Giancarlo Valt	Andrea Pavani	Tofane Curling Club, Cortina d’Ampezzo
Netherlands	Eric Harmsen	Robert Harmsen	Jack De Meyere	Otto Veening	
Norway	Rolv Kristian Yri	Torger H. Sletten	Harald Ramsfjell	Øystein Skyberg	Brumunddal Curling Club, Oslo
Scotland	James Sanderson	Iain Baxter	Colin Baxter	Willie Sanderson	Oxenfoord Curling Club, Edinburgh
Sweden	Anders Thidholm (fourth)	Hans Söderström	Anders Nilsson	Bertil Timan (skip)	Härnösands Curlingklubb, Härnösand
Switzerland	Jürg Tanner	Jürg Hornisberger	Franz Tanner	Patrik Lörtscher	Lausanne-Riviera Curling Club, Lausanne

=== Round robin ===
	Team	A1	A2	A3	A4	A5	A6	A7	A8	A9	A10	W	L	Place
A1	Denmark	*	10:5	7:6	12:3	6:4	8:3	4:10	3:7	10:6	4:5	6	3	3
A2	England	5:10	*	6:7	1:12	2:8	13:8	5:10	2:13	4:13	6:8	1	8	9
A3	France	6:7	7:6	*	6:7	1:8	10:8	3:11	5:4	5:8	6:8	3	6	8
A4	Germany	3:12	12:1	7:6	*	4:10	15:10	3:6	7:4	5:9	4:8	4	5	7
A5	Italy	4:6	8:2	8:1	10:4	*	9:4	6:5	6:7	4:8	3:10	5	4	6
A6	Netherlands	3:8	8:13	8:10	10:15	4:9	*	5:16	6:14	5:10	4:18	0	9	10
A7	Norway	10:4	10:5	11:3	6:3	5:6	16:5	*	6:7	6:7	4:6	5	4	5
A8	Scotland	7:3	13:2	4:5	4:7	7:6	14:6	7:6	*	1:8	4:6	5	4	4
A9	Sweden	6:10	13:4	8:5	9:5	8:4	10:5	7:6	8:1	*	3:8	7	2	2
A10	Switzerland	5:4	8:6	8:6	8:4	10:3	18:4	6:4	6:4	8:3	*	9	0	1

Team to final
Teams to semifinal

=== Playoffs ===
Semifinal			Final
			1	Switzerland	6
2	Sweden	11		Sweden	5
3	Denmark	2

=== Final standings ===
Place	Team	Skip	GP	W	L
1st place, gold medalist(s)	Switzerland	Jürg Tanner	10	10	0
2nd place, silver medalist(s)	Sweden	Bertil Timan	11	8	3
3rd place, bronze medalist(s)	Denmark	Tommy Stjerne	10	6	4
4	Scotland	James Sanderson	9	5	4
5	Norway	Rolv Kristian Yri	9	5	4
6	Italy	Giuseppe Dal Molin	9	5	4
7	Germany	Hans Jörg Herberg	9	4	5
8	France	Robert Thierriaz	9	3	6
9	England	Ronald D. Thornton	9	1	8
10	Netherlands	Eric Harmsen	9	0	9

== Women's ==
=== Teams ===
Team	Skip	Third	Second	Lead	Curling club
Denmark	Inger Torbensen	Lizzi hallum	Lisbet Mikkelsen	Alice Peters	
England	Connie Miller	Susan Hinds	Christine Black	Freda Fischer	
France	Paulette Delachat	Huguette Jullien	Suzanne Parodi	Erna Gay	
Germany	Renate Grüner	Susi Kiesel	Irmi Wagner	Valentina Fischer-Weppler	
Italy	Maria-Grazzia Constantini	Marina Pavani	Ann Lacedelli	Tea Valt	
Norway	Bente Hoel	Herborg Pettersen	Maria Löfroth-Christensen	Åse Wilhelmsen	
Scotland	Isobel Torrance	Marion Armour	Isobel Waddell	Margaret Wiseman	
Sweden	Inga Arfwidsson	Barbro Arfwidsson	Ingrid Appelquist	Gunvor Björhäll	Norrköpings Curlingklubb, Norrköping
Switzerland	Heidi Neuenschwander	Dorli Broger	Brigitte Kienast	Evi Rüegsegger	

=== Round robin ===
	Team	A1	A2	A3	A4	A5	A6	A7	A8	A9	W	L	Place
A1	Denmark	*	13:0	8:13	4:11	9:8	10:7	6:10	2:12	7:9	3	5	6
A2	England	0:13	*	3:11	3:14	9:8	7:18	6:10	4:10	10:8	2	6	8
A3	France	13:8	11:3	*	14:4	7:3	15:3	5:9	7:8	8:9	5	3	4
A4	Germany	11:4	14:3	4:14	*	6:7	12:8	7:12	1:19	4:16	3	5	5
A5	Italy	8:9	8:9	3:7	7:6	*	6:10	1:12	4:7	4:12	1	7	9
A6	Norway	7:10	18:7	3:15	8:12	10:6	*	6:9	4:9	4:11	2	6	7
A7	Scotland	10:6	10:6	9:5	12:7	12:1	9:6	*	3:6	3:10	6	2	3
A8	Sweden	12:2	10:4	8:7	19:1	7:4	9:4	6:3	*	8:7	8	0	1
A9	Switzerland	9:7	8:10	9:8	16:4	12:4	11:4	10:3	7:8	*	6	2	2

Team to final
Teams to semifinal

=== Playoffs ===
Semifinal			Final
			1	Sweden	11
2	Switzerland	7		Switzerland	2
3	Scotland	3

=== Final standings ===
Place	Team	Skip	GP	W	L
1st place, gold medalist(s)	Sweden	Inga Arfwidsson	9	9	0
2nd place, silver medalist(s)	Switzerland	Heidi Neuenschwander	10	7	3
3rd place, bronze medalist(s)	Scotland	Isobel Torrance	9	6	3
4	France	Paulette Delachat	8	5	3
5	Germany	Renate Grüner	8	3	5
6	Denmark	Inger Torbensen	8	3	5
7	Norway	Bente Hoel	8	2	6
8	England	Connie Miller	8	2	6
9	Italy	Maria-Grazzia Constantini	8	1	7
