= Vågberg =

Vågberg is a Norwegian surname. Notable people with the surname include:

- Lars Vågberg (born 1967), Norwegian curler
- Magnus Vågberg, Norwegian curler
- Trine Trulsen Vågberg (born 1962), Norwegian curler, wife of Lars
