= Willie Frame (curler) =

Scottish male curler

- Curler ♂

Team
- Curling club: Hamilton & Thornyhill CC, Hamilton, SCO

Curling career
- Member Association: Scotland
- World Championship: 2 (1974, 1979)
- European Championship: 1 (1979)
Medal record
Curling
European Championships
Gold medal – first place	1979 Varese
Scottish Men's Championship
Gold medal – first place	1974
Gold medal – first place	1979

William Frame is a Scottish curler. He is a 1979 European champion.

== Teams ==
Season	Skip	Third	Second	Lead	Events
1973–74	Jimmy Waddell	Jim Steele	Robert Kirkland	Willie Frame	SMCC 1974 (gold); WCC 1974 (8th)
1978–79	Jimmy Waddell	Willie Frame	Jim Forrest	George Bryan	SMCC 1979 (gold); WCC 1979 (6th)
1979–80	Jimmy Waddell	Willie Frame	Jim Forrest	George Bryan	ECC 1979 (gold)
