= Andrea Pavani =

Italian male curler

- Curler ♂
- Born: 11 November 1954 (age 72); Caracas, Venezuela

Team
- Curling club: CC Cortina, Cortina d'Ampezzo, CC Tofane, Cortina d'Ampezzo

Curling career
- Member Association: Italy
- World Championship: 14 (1973, 1974, 1976, 1977, 1979, 1980, 1981, 1982, 1984, 1985, 1986, 1989, 1990)
- European Championship: 10 (1975, 1976, 1978, 1979, 1982, 1983, 1984, 1985, 1986, 1989)
Medal record
Curling
European Championships
Bronze medal – third place	1979 Varese

Andrea Pavani (born 11 November 1954 in Caracas, Venezuela) is an Italian curler.

At the international level, he is a 1979 European bronze medallist.

At the national level, he is a fourteen-time Italian men's champion curler.

== Teams ==
Season	Skip	Third	Second	Lead	Alternate	Events
1972–73	Renato Ghezze	Paolo da Ros	Lino Mariani Maier	Andrea Pavani		WCC 1973 (9th)
1973–74	Renato Ghezze	Lino Mariani Maier	Roberto Zangara	Andrea Pavani		WCC 1974 (10th)
1975–76	Leone Rezzadore	Andrea Pavani	Enea Pavani	Carlo Constantini		ECC 1975 (8th)
1975–76	Giuseppe Dal Molin	Andrea Pavani	Enea Pavani	Leone Rezzadore		WCC 1976 (5th)
1976–77	Giuseppe Dal Molin	Andrea Pavani	Enea Pavani	Giorgio Vani		ECC 1976 (8th)
1976–77	Giuseppe Dal Molin	Andrea Pavani	Giancarlo Valt	Enea Pavani		WCC 1977 (7th)
1978–79	Giuseppe Dal Molin	Enea Pavani	Giancarlo Valt	Andrea Pavani		ECC 1978 (6th)
1978–79	Giuseppe Dal Molin	Andrea Pavani	Giancarlo Valt	Enea Pavani		WCC 1979 (8th)
1979–80	Giuseppe Dal Molin	Andrea Pavani	Giancarlo Valt	Enea Pavani		ECC 1979 (bronze)
1979–80	Andrea Pavani (fourth)	Giuseppe Dal Molin (skip)	Giancarlo Valt	Enea Pavani		WCC 1980 (7th)
1980–81	Andrea Pavani (fourth)	Giuseppe Dal Molin (skip)	Giancarlo Valt	Enea Pavani		WCC 1981 (7th)
1981–82	Andrea Pavani	Giancarlo Valt	Enrico Alberti	Enea Pavani		WCC 1982 (6th)
1982–83	Andrea Pavani	Enrico Alberti	Giancarlo Valt	Gianantonio Gillarduzzi		ECC 1982 (13th)
1983–84	Andrea Pavani	Franco Sovilla	Giancarlo Valt	Stefano Morona		ECC 1983 (9th); WCC 1984 (8th)
1984–85	Andrea Pavani	Franco Sovilla	Giancarlo Valt	Stefano Morona		ECC 1984 (9th); WCC 1985 (7th)
1985–86	Andrea Pavani	Franco Sovilla	Fabio Alverà	Stefano Morona	Enea Pavani (WCC)	ECC 1985 (12th); WCC 1986 (10th)
1986–87	Andrea Pavani	Franco Sovilla	Fabio Alverà	Stefano Morona		ECC 1986 (4th)
1988–89	Andrea Pavani	Adriano Lorenzi	Fabio Alverà	Stefano Morona	Stefano Zardini	WCC 1989 (7th)
1989–90	Andrea Pavani	Fabio Alverà	Franco Sovilla	Stefano Morona	Stefano Zardini (WCC)	ECC 1989 (9th); WCC 1990 (9th)

== Personal life ==
His father Enea Pavani and sister Marina Pavani are also a curlers and multi-time Italian curling champions.
