= Ellen Githmark =

Norwegian female curler

- Curler ♀

Team
- Curling club: Snarøen CC, Bærum

Curling career
- Member Association: Norway
- World Championship: 3 (1979, 1980, 1984)
- European Championship: 4 (1979, 1980, 1991, 1992)
Medal record
Curling
European Championships
Silver medal – second place	1980 Copenhagen
Silver medal – second place	1991 Chamonix
Bronze medal – third place	1992 Perth
Norwegian Women's Championship
Gold medal – first place	1979
Gold medal – first place	1980
Gold medal – first place	1984

Ellen Githmark is a former Norwegian curler.

At the international level, she is a silver and bronze medallist at the European championships.

At the national level, she is a three-time Norwegian women's champion curler (1979, 1980, 1984).

== Teams ==
Season	Skip	Third	Second	Lead	Events
1978–79	Ellen Githmark	Eli Kolstad	Kirsten Vaule	Ingvill Githmark	NWCC 1979 (gold); WCC 1979 (9th)
1979–80	Ellen Githmark	Trine Trulsen	Ingvill Githmark	Kirsten Vaule	ECC 1979 (8th); NWCC 1980 (gold); WCC 1980 (7th)
1980–81	Ellen Githmark	Trine Trulsen	Ingvill Githmark	Kirsten Vaule	ECC 1980 (silver)
1983–84	Ellen Githmark	Ingvill Githmark	Heidi Throndsen	Anka Sunde Andreasen	NWCC 1984 (gold); WCC 1984 (4th)
1991–92	Trine Trulsen	Ellen Githmark	Ingvill Githmark	Billie Sørum	ECC 1991 (silver)
1992–93	Trine Trulsen	Ellen Githmark	Ingvill Githmark	Billie Sørum	ECC 1992 (bronze)
