= Norwegian Women's Curling Championship =

The Norwegian Women's Curling Championship (Norwegian: Norgesmesterskap i curling for damer) is the national championship of women's curling in Norway. It has been held annually since 1979. It is organized by the Norwegian Curling Association (Norwegian: Norges Curlingforbund).

== List of champions and medallists ==
(Team line-up in order: skip (marked bold), third, second, lead, alternate(s), coach)

Year	Champion team	Runner-up	Bronze
1979	Asker CK (Oslo); Ellen Githmark		
1980	Asker CK (Oslo); Ellen Githmark		
1981	Snarøen CK (Oslo); Anne Jøtun Bakke		
1982	Snarøen CK (Oslo); Trine Trulsen		
1983	Trondheim CK (Trondheim); Eva Vanvik		
1984	Asker CK (Oslo); Ellen Githmark		
1985	Trondheim CK (Trondheim); Eva Vanvik		
1986	Snarøen CK (Oslo); Anne Jøtun Bakke		
1987	Snarøen CK (Oslo); Anne Jøtun Bakke		
1988	Snarøen CK (Oslo); Anne Jøtun Bakke		
1989	Snarøen CK (Oslo); Trine Trulsen		
1990	Snarøen CK (Oslo); Dordi Nordby		
1991	Snarøen CK (Oslo); Dordi Nordby		
1992	Snarøen CK (Oslo); Dordi Nordby		
1993	Snarøen CK (Oslo); Dordi Nordby		
1994	Oslo CK (Oslo); Ingvill Githmark		
1995	Snarøen CK (Oslo); Dordi Nordby		
1996	Snarøen CK (Oslo); Dordi Nordby		
1997	Snarøen CK (Oslo); Dordi Nordby		
1998	Snarøen CK (Oslo); Dordi Nordby		
1999	Snarøen CK (Oslo); Dordi Nordby		
2000	Snarøen CK (Oslo); Dordi Nordby		
2001	Snarøen CK (Oslo); Dordi Nordby		
2002	Snarøen CK (Oslo); Dordi Nordby		
2003	Risenga CK (Oslo); Linn Githmark		
2004	Snarøen CK (Oslo); Dordi Nordby		
2005	?? (no information)		
2006	Oppdal CK (Oppdal); Kristin Skaslien		
2007	Bygdøy (Oslo); Linn Githmark		
2008	Snarøen CK (Oslo); Dordi Nordby		
2009	Oppdal CK (Oppdal); Kristin Skaslien		
2010	Snarøen CK (Oslo); Marianne Rørvik		
2011	Snarøen CK (Oslo); Marianne Rørvik		
2012	Snarøen CK (Oslo); Marianne Rørvik		
2013	?? (no information)		
2014	Oppdal CK (Oppdal); Kristin Skaslien		
2015	Oppdal CK (Oppdal); Kristin Skaslien, Anneline Skårsmoen, Julie Molnar, Kristine Davanger		
2016	Oslo CK (Oslo); Kristin Skaslien		
2017	Lag Skaslien, Oslo CK (Oslo); Kristin Skaslien, Anneline Skårsmoen, Julie Molnar, Kristine Davanger	Lag Dundersalt, Stabekk CK (Stabekk); Linn Githmark, Henriette Løvar, Kristin Løvseth, Gøril Bye	Lag Ramsfjell, Stabekk CK (Stabekk); Maia Ramsfjell, Martine Rønning, Mathilde Hoen, Henriette Halvorsen, alternate: Mille Haslev Nordbye
2018	Lag Ramsfjell, Lillehammer CK (Lillehammer); Maia Ramsfjell, Martine Rønning, Mille Haslev Nordbye, Victoria Hewitt Johansen	Lag Skaslien, Oslo CK (Oslo); Kristin Skaslien, Linn Githmark, Ingvild Skaga, Jen Cunningham	Lag Bremnes, Halden CC (Halden); Anne Grethe Bremnes, Anne Grethe Hewitt, Jeanette Husnes Moe, Hilde Stenseth
2019	Lag Ramsfjell, Lillehammer CK (Lillehammer); Maia Ramsfjell, Martine Rønning, Mille Haslev Nordbye, Astri Forbregd	Lag Eli Skaslien, Oppdal CK (Oppdal); Eli Skaslien, Mari A Forbregd, Eline Mjøen, Hannah Skarsheim Rian	Lag Mesloe, Oppdal CK (Oppdal); Eirin Mesloe, Nina Aune, Ingeborg Forbregd, Torild Bjørnstad
2020	Lag Ramsfjell, Lillehammer CK (Lillehammer); Maia Ramsfjell, Martine Rønning, Mille Haslev Nordbye, Astri Forbregd	Lag Rørvik, Oslo CK (Oslo); Kristin Skaslien, Marianne Rørvik, Pia Trulsen, Jen Cunningham	Lag Davanger, Stabekk CK (Stabekk); Kristine Davanger, Julie Molnar, Ingrid Michalsen, Ingvild Skaga, alternate: Anneline Skårsmoen
2022	OCE MEAS Mesloe, Oppdal CK; Eirin Mesloe, Torild Bjørnstad, Nora Østgård, Ingeborg Forbregd	Lag Rørvik, Lillehammer CK; Kristin Skaslien, Marianne Rørvik, Mille Haslev Nordbye, Martine Rønning	Lag Skaga, Stabekk CK; Ingvild Skaga, Marina Hauser, Randi Tørrissen, Stine Skog Dale
2023	Lillehammer CK; Kristin Skaslien, Marianne Rørvik, Mille Haslev Nordbye, Martine Rønning	Stabekk/Halden; Ingvild Skaga, Marina Hauser, Victoria Hewitt Johansen, Anne Grethe Hewitt	Oppdal CK; Eirin Mesloe, Torild Bjørnstad, Nora Østgård, Ingeborg Forbregd
2024	Oppdal CK; Torild Bjørnstad, Nora Østgård, Ingeborg Forbregd, Eilin Kjærland	Lillehammer CK; Kristin Skaslien, Marianne Rørvik, Mille Haslev Nordbye, Martine Rønning	Stabekk/Halden; Marina Hauser, Janne Fossen, Grethe Brenna, Randi Tørrissen
2025	Oppdal CK; Torild Bjørnstad, Nora Østgård, Ingeborg Forbregd, Eirin Mesloe	Lillehammer CK; Kristin Skaslien, Marianne Rørvik, Mille Haslev Nordbye, Eilin Kjærland	Lillehammer CK; Sylvi Hausstätter, Andrine Rønning, Lydia Haagensen, Martine Rønning
2026	Lillehammer CK; Kristin Skaslien, Marianne Rørvik, Mille Haslev Nordbye, Eilin Kjærland	Oppdal CK; Torild Bjørnstad, Nora Østgård, Ingeborg Forbregd, Eirin Mesloe	Stabekk/Halden; Ingvild Skaga, Marina Hauser, Janne Fossen, Alfhild Wærø

== See also ==
- Norwegian Men's Curling Championship
- Norwegian Mixed Curling Championship
- Norwegian Mixed Doubles Curling Championship
- Norwegian Junior Mixed Doubles Curling Championship
