= Gunvor Björhäll =

Swedish curler (born 1922)

- Curler ♀
- Born: 20 April 1922

Team
- Curling club: Norrköpings CK, Norrköping

Curling career
- Member Association: Sweden
- European Championship: 1 (1978)
Medal record
Curling
European Championships
Gold medal – first place	1978 Aviemore
Swedish Women's Championship
Gold medal – first place	1978
Gold medal – first place	1985

Gunvor Björhäll (20 April 1922 – 13 July 2006) was a Swedish curler.

Björhäll is a 1978 European champion.

== Teams ==
Season	Skip	Third	Second	Lead	Events
1977–78	Inga Arfwidsson	Barbro Arfwidsson	Ingrid Appelquist	Gunvor Björhäll	SWCC 1978 (gold)
1978–79	Inga Arfwidsson	Barbro Arfwidsson	Ingrid Appelquist	Gunvor Björhäll	ECC 1978 (gold)
