= Peter J. D. Wilson =

Scottish and Irish male curler and coach

- Curler ♂
- Born: 5 March 1955 (age 71)

Team
- Curling club: Stranraer Ice Rink, Stranraer, Limekiln CC

Curling career
- Member Association: Scotland, Ireland
- World Championship: 1 (2006)
- European Championship: 5 (2004, 2005, 2006, 2007, 2008)
- Other appearances: World Junior Championships: 1 (1975), World Senior Championships: 3 (2011, 2013, 2016)
Medal record
Curling
Representing Scotland
World Junior Championships
| Bronze medal – third place | 1975 East York |
Representing Ireland
World Senior Championships
| Bronze medal – third place | 2016 Karlstad |

Peter J. D. Wilson (born 5 March 1955) is a Scottish and Irish curler and curling coach.

As of 2015, he was a President of Irish Curling Association.

== Teams ==
| Season | Skip | Third | Second | Lead | Alternate | Coach | Events |
|---|---|---|---|---|---|---|---|
| 1974–75 | Peter J.D. Wilson | Andrew McQuistin | Neale McQuistin | John Sharp | | | SJCC 1975 (gold); WJCC 1975 (bronze) |
| 2004–05 | Peter Wilson | Robin Gray | Johnjo Kenny | Peter J.D. Wilson | John Furey | Gordon McIntyre | ECC 2004 (12th) |
| 2005–06 | Douglas Dryburgh | Peter Wilson | Robin Gray | Johnjo Kenny | Peter J.D. Wilson | | ECC 2005 (7th); WCC 2006 (12th) |
| 2006–07 | Robin Gray | Johnjo Kenny | Peter J.D. Wilson | Neil Fyfe | Tony Tierney | | ECC 2006 (9th) |
| 2007–08 | Peter Wilson | Robin Gray | Peter J.D. Wilson | Neil Fyfe | Tony Tierney | Ron Meyers | ECC 2007 (11th) |
| 2008–09 | Peter J.D. Wilson | Bill Gray | Neil Fyfe | John Furey | David Smith | Ron Meyers | ECC 2008 (10th) |
| 2010–11 | Peter J.D. Wilson | David Whyte | Tony Tierney | David Hume | Gerry O'Kane | Anne Wilson | WSCC 2011 (11th) |
| 2012–13 | Peter Wilson | Peter J.D. Wilson | Neil Fyfe | Tom Roche | Johnjo Kenny | Anne Wilson | WSCC 2013 (9th) |
| 2015–16 | Peter Wilson | Peter J.D. Wilson | Ross Barr | Tony Tierney | Neil Fyfe | Gordon McIntyre | WSCC 2016 (bronze) |

== Record as a coach of national teams ==
| Year | Tournament, event | National team | Place |
|---|---|---|---|
| 2009 | 2009 European Curling Championships | Ireland (men) | 14 |
| 2014 | 2014 World Mixed Doubles Curling Championship | Ireland (mixed double) | 26 |
| 2016 | 2016 World Mixed Doubles Curling Championship | Ireland (mixed double) | 12 |
| 2019 | 2019 World Mixed Doubles Curling Championship | Ireland (mixed double) | 34 |
