= Jim Forrest (curler) =

Scottish male curler

- Curler ♂

Team
- Curling club: Hamilton & Thornyhill CC; Hamilton, SCO

Curling career
- Member Association: Scotland
- World Championship: 1 (1979)
- European Championship: 1 (1979)
Medal record
Curling
European Championships
Gold medal – first place	1979 Varese
Scottish Men's Championship
Gold medal – first place	1979

Jim Forrest is a Scottish curler. He is a 1979 European champion.

== Teams ==
Season	Skip	Third	Second	Lead	Events
1978–79	Jimmy Waddell	Willie Frame	Jim Forrest	George Bryan	SMCC 1979 (gold); WCC 1979 (6th)
1979–80	Jimmy Waddell	Willie Frame	Jim Forrest	George Bryan	ECC 1979 (gold)
