= Jeanette Johnston =

Scottish curler

- Curler ♀

Team
- Curling club: Falkirk Ladies Curling Club

Curling career
- Member Association: Scotland
- World Championship: 1 (1979)
- European Championship: 2 (1979, 1985)
- Other appearances: World Senior Championships: 1 (2005)
Medal record
Curling
World Championships
Bronze medal – third place	1979 Perth
European Championships
Silver medal – second place	1985 Grindelwald
Bronze medal – third place	1979 Varese
Scottish Women's Championship
Gold medal – first place	1979
World Senior Championships
Gold medal – first place	2005 Greenacres

Jeanette Johnston is a Scottish curler.

She is a 1979 World bronze medallist and 1979 European bronze medallist. She is a EuCC 1985 European Championships Grundelwald Switzerland Silver medallist. She is a WSWCC 2005 World Senior Women's Championship Gold medallist

In 2003–2004 she was a President of Ladies Branch of Scottish Curling Association.

She worked as FISU Technical Delegate for curling from 2009 in Harbin China until Lake Placid in 2023. at the 2019 Winter Universiade.

== Teams ==
Season	Skip	Third	Second	Lead	Alternate	Events
1978–79	Beth Lindsay	Ann McKellar	Jeanette Johnston	May Taylor		SWCC 1979 (gold); WCC 1979 (bronze)
1979–80	Beth Lindsay	Ann McKellar	Jeanette Johnston	May Taylor		ECC 1979 (bronze)
1985–86	Jeanette Johnston	Catherine Dodds	Marjorie Kidd	Ella Gallanders		ECC 1985 (silver)
2004–05	Carolyn Morris	Pat Lockhart	Jeanette Johnston	Linda Lesperance	Catherine Edington	WSCC 2005 (gold)
