= Gunilla Bergman =

Swedish curler and coach

- Curler ♀
- Other names: Nilla
- Born: 29 January 1949 (age 77)

Team
- Curling club: Amatörföreningens CK, Stockholm

Curling career
- Member Association: Sweden
- World Championship: 1 (1979)
- European Championship: 1 (1979)
Medal record
Curling
World championships
Silver medal – second place	1979 Perth
European Championships
Silver medal – second place	1979 Varese
Swedish Women's Championship
Gold medal – first place	1979
World Senior Championships
Bronze medal – third place	2009 Dunedin

Gunilla "Nilla" Bergman (born 29 January 1949) is a Swedish curler and curling coach.

She is a 1979 World silver medallist and a 1979 European silver medallist.

In 1982 she was inducted into the Swedish Curling Hall of Fame.

== Teams ==
Season	Skip	Third	Second	Lead	Alternate	Events
1978–79	Birgitta Törn	Katarina Hultling	Susanne Gynning-Ödling	Gunilla Bergman		SWCC 1979 (gold); WCC 1979 (silver)
1979–80	Birgitta Törn	Katarina Hultling	Susanne Gynning-Ödling	Gunilla Bergman		ECC 1979 (silver)
2008–09	Ingrid Meldahl	Ann-Catrin Kjerr	Anta Hedström	Sylvia Liljefors	Gunilla Bergman	WSCC 2009 (bronze)

== Record as a coach of national teams ==
Year	Tournament, event	National team	Place
2004	2004 World Senior Curling Championships	Sweden (senior women)	2nd place, silver medalist(s)
2005	2005 World Senior Curling Championships	Sweden (senior women)	3rd place, bronze medalist(s)
2006	2006 World Senior Curling Championships	Sweden (senior women)	1st place, gold medalist(s)
2007	2007 World Senior Curling Championships	Sweden (senior women)	1st place, gold medalist(s)
2008	2008 World Senior Curling Championships	Sweden (senior women)	6
2011	2011 World Senior Curling Championships	Sweden (senior women)	2nd place, silver medalist(s)
2012	2012 World Senior Curling Championships	Sweden (senior women)	3rd place, bronze medalist(s)
2014	2014 World Senior Curling Championships	Sweden (senior women)	4
