= Jürg Hornisberger =

Swiss male curler

- Curler ♂

Team
- Curling club: CC Lausanne-Riviera, Lausanne

Curling career
- Member Association: Switzerland
- World Championship: 3 (1980, 1981, 1982)
- European Championship: 3 (1978, 1981, 1982)
- Other appearances: World Junior Championships: 1 (1977)
Medal record
Curling
World Championships
Gold medal – first place	1981 London
Silver medal – second place	1982 Garmisch-Partenkirchen
Bronze medal – third place	1980 Moncton
European Championships
Gold medal – first place	1978 Aviemore
Gold medal – first place	1981 Grindelwald
Bronze medal – third place	1982 Kirkcaldy
Swiss Men's Championship
Gold medal – first place	1980
Gold medal – first place	1981
Gold medal – first place	1982

Jürg Hornisberger is a former Swiss curler. He played third position on the Swiss rink that won the 1981 World Men's Championship and two European Championships (1978 and 1981). He is one of the most international titled Swiss male curlers.

== Teams ==
Season	Skip	Third	Second	Lead	Coach	Events
1976–77	Jürg Tanner	Jean Pierre Morisetti	Jürg Hornisberger	Patrik Lörtscher		SJCC 1977 (gold); WJCC 1977 (5th)
1978–79	Jürg Tanner	Jürg Hornisberger	Franz Tanner	Patrik Lörtscher		ECC 1978 (gold)
1979–80	Jürg Tanner	Jürg Hornisberger	Franz Tanner	Patrik Lörtscher		SMCC 1980 (gold); WCC 1980 (bronze)
1980–81	Jürg Tanner	Jürg Hornisberger	Patrik Lörtscher	Franz Tanner		SMCC 1981 (gold); WCC 1981 (gold)
1981–82	Jürg Tanner	Jürg Hornisberger	Patrik Lörtscher	Franz Tanner	Bruno Leutenegger	ECC 1981 (gold); SMCC 1982 (gold); WCC 1982 (silver)
1982–83	Jürg Tanner	Jürg Hornisberger	Patrik Lörtscher	Franz Tanner		ECC 1982 (bronze)
