= Ingrid Appelquist =

Swedish female curler

- Curler ♀
- Other names: Ingrid Appelqvist
- Born: 21 February 1931 (age 95)

Team
- Curling club: Norrköpings CK, Norrköping

Curling career
- Member Association: Sweden
- European Championship: 1 (1978)
Medal record
Curling
European Championships
| Gold medal – first place | 1978 Aviemore |
Swedish Women's Championship
| Gold medal – first place | 1978 |
| Gold medal – first place | 1985 |

Ingrid Appelquist (born 21 February 1931) is a Swedish female curler.

She is a 1978 European champion.

== Teams ==
| Season | Skip | Third | Second | Lead | Events |
|---|---|---|---|---|---|
| 1977–78 | Inga Arfwidsson | Barbro Arfwidsson | Ingrid Appelquist | Gunvor Björhäll | SWCC 1978 (gold) |
| 1978–79 | Inga Arfwidsson | Barbro Arfwidsson | Ingrid Appelquist | Gunvor Björhäll | ECC 1978 (gold) |
