= Karl-Erik Bruneflod =

Swedish male curler (1918–2008)

- Curler ♂
- Other names: Ecke
- Born: 24 March 1918
- Died: 14 April 2008 (aged 90)

Team
- Curling club: Sundsvalls CK, Sundsvall

Curling career
- Member Association: Sweden
- World Championship: 1 (1979)
Medal record
Curling
Swedish Men's Championship
Gold medal – first place	1979

Karl-Erik "Ecke" Bruneflod (24 March 1918 – 14 April 2008) was a Swedish curler., a 1979 Swedish men's curling champion and a two-time Swedish mixed curling champion (1969, 1974).

In 1970 he was inducted into the Swedish Curling Hall of Fame.

He worked for Swedish Curling Association (Swedish: Svenska Curlingförbundet) as a chairman (1978–1982) and as a board member (1967–1978).

== Teams ==
=== Men's ===
Season	Skip	Third	Second	Lead	Events
1972–73	Karl-Erik Bruneflod	Nils Holm	Karl-Axel Edgren	Sten Lundqvist	SSCC 1973 (gold)
1978–79	Anders Grahn (fourth)	Ken Bruneflod	Karl-Erik Bruneflod (skip)	Roger Bredin	SMCC 1979 (gold); WCC 1979 (7th)

=== Mixed ===
Season	Skip	Third	Second	Lead	Events
1969	Karl-Erik Bruneflod	Ann-Marie Bruneflod	Lennart Byström	Anna-Stina Ridderheim	SMxCC 1969 (gold)
1974	Ecke Bruneflod	Ann-Marie Bruneflod	Bo Högström	Aina Brunzell	SMxCC 1974 (gold)

== Personal life ==
His son is Swedish curler Ken Bruneflod. They played together at the 1979 World championship.
