= Gitmark =

Gitmark is a Norwegian surname. Notable people with the surname include:

- Helga Gitmark (1929–2008), Norwegian politician
- Peter Skovholt Gitmark (born 1977), Norwegian politician

== See also ==
- Githmark
