= Ingvill Githmark =

Norwegian curler

- Curler ♀

Team
- Curling club: Asker CC, Asker, Oslo CC, Oslo, Snarøen CC, Bærum

Curling career
- Member Association: Norway
- World Championship: 6 (1979, 1980, 1984, 1987, 1988, 1994)
- European Championship: 4 (1979, 1980, 1991, 1992)
Medal record
Curling
European Championships
Silver medal – second place	1980 Copenhagen
Silver medal – second place	1991 Chamonix
Bronze medal – third place	1992 Perth
Norwegian Women's Championship
Gold medal – first place	1979
Gold medal – first place	1980
Gold medal – first place	1984
Gold medal – first place	1987
Gold medal – first place	1988
Gold medal – first place	1994

Ingvill Githmark is a former Norwegian curler.

At the international level, she is a silver and bronze medallist at the European championships.

At the national level, she is a six-time Norwegian women's champion curler (1979, 1980, 1984, 1987, 1988, 1994).

== Teams ==
Season	Skip	Third	Second	Lead	Alternate	Events
1978–79	Ellen Githmark	Eli Kolstad	Kirsten Vaule	Ingvill Githmark		NWCC 1979 (gold); WCC 1979 (9th)
1979–80	Ellen Githmark	Trine Trulsen	Ingvill Githmark	Kirsten Vaule		ECC 1979 (8th); NWCC 1980 (gold); WCC 1980 (7th)
1980–81	Ellen Githmark	Trine Trulsen	Ingvill Githmark	Kirsten Vaule		ECC 1980 (silver)
1983–84	Ellen Githmark	Ingvill Githmark	Heidi Throndsen	Anka Sunde Andreasen		NWCC 1984 (gold); WCC 1984 (4th)
1986–87	Anne Jøtun Bakke	Hilde Jøtun	Ingvill Githmark	Billie Sørum		NWCC 1987 (gold); WCC 1987 (4th)
1987–88	Anne Jøtun Bakke	Hilde Jøtun	Ingvill Githmark	Billie Sørum		NWCC 1988 (gold); WCC 1988 (4th)
1991–92	Trine Trulsen	Ellen Githmark	Ingvill Githmark	Billie Sørum		ECC 1991 (silver)
1992–93	Trine Trulsen	Ellen Githmark	Ingvill Githmark	Billie Sørum		ECC 1992 (bronze)
1993–94	Ingvill Githmark	Gøril Bye	Ellen Kittelsen	Line Marie Bjerke	Therese Bye	NWCC 1994 (gold); WCC 1994 (4th)
