= Hans Söderström =

Swedish male curler (born 1957)

- Curler ♂
- Other names: Hatto
- Born: 21 January 1957 (age 69)

Team
- Curling club: Härnösands CK, Härnösand

Curling career
- Member Association: Sweden
- World Championship: 1 (1981)
- European Championship: 2 (1978, 1979)
Medal record
Curling
European Championships
Silver medal – second place	1978 Aviemore
Silver medal – second place	1979 Varese
Swedish Men's Championship
Gold medal – first place	1981

Hans Erik "Hatto" Söderström (born 21 January 1957) is a Swedish curler, a two-time European championship silver medallist (1978, 1979) and a 1981 Swedish men's curling champion.

In 1981 he was inducted into the Swedish Curling Hall of Fame.

== Teams ==
Season	Skip	Third	Second	Lead	Alternate	Events
1977–78	Bertil Timan	Anders Thidholm	Ante Nilsson	Hans Söderström		
1978–79	Anders Thidholm (fourth)	Hans Söderström	Anders Nilsson	Bertil Timan (skip)		ECC 1978 (silver)
1979–80	Jan Ullsten	Anders Thidholm	Anders Nilsson	Hans Söderström	Bertil Timan	ECC 1979 (silver)
1980–81	Jan Ullsten	Anders Thidholm	Anders Nilsson	Hans Söderström		SMCC 1981 (gold); WCC 1981 (5th)
2011–12	Mats Nyberg	Björn Rosendahl	Per Södergren	Hans Söderström	Thomas Andersson	
2012–13	Mats Nyberg	Björn Rosendahl	Hans Söderström	Per Södergren	Thomas Andersson	
2013–14	Mats Nyberg	Björn Rosendahl	Hans Söderström	Per Södergren	Thomas Andersson	
2014–15	Mats Nyberg	Björn Rosendahl	Hans Söderström	Per Södergren	Thomas Andersson	
2015–16	Mats Nyberg	Björn Rosendahl	Hans Söderström	Per Södergren	Thomas Andersson	
2016–17	Mats Nyberg	Björn Rosendahl	Hans Söderström	Per Södergren	Lars Carlsson	
2017–18	Mats Nyberg	Björn Rosendahl	Hans Söderström	Per Södergren	Thomas Andersson	
2018–19	Stig Gisslén	Hans Söderström	Björn Rosendahl	Mats Nyberg	Thomas Andersson	SSCC 2019 (5th)
