= Enea Pavani =

Italian curler

- Curler ♂
- Born: 24 October 1920; Cortina d'Ampezzo
- Died: 4 October 1998 (aged 77); Cortina d'Ampezzo

Team
- Curling club: CC Cortina, Cortina d'Ampezzo, CC Tofane, Cortina d'Ampezzo

Curling career
- Member Association: Italy
- World Championship: 8 (1975, 1976, 1977, 1979, 1980, 1981, 1982, 1986)
- European Championship: 5 (1975, 1976, 1977, 1978, 1979)
Medal record
Curling
European Championships
Bronze medal – third place	1979 Varese

Enea Pavani (born 24 October 1920 in Cortina d'Ampezzo, died 4 October 1998 in Cortina d'Ampezzo) was an Italian curler.

At the international level, he is a 1979 European bronze medallist.

At the national level, he is an eight-time Italian men's champion curler.

== Teams ==
Season	Skip	Third	Second	Lead	Alternate	Events
1974–75	Giuseppe Dal Molin	Leone Rezzadore	Franco Caldara	Enea Pavani		WCC 1975 (10th)
1975–76	Leone Rezzadore	Andrea Pavani	Enea Pavani	Carlo Constantini		ECC 1975 (8th)
1975–76	Giuseppe Dal Molin	Andrea Pavani	Enea Pavani	Leone Rezzadore		WCC 1976 (5th)
1976–77	Giuseppe Dal Molin	Andrea Pavani	Enea Pavani	Giorgio Vani		ECC 1976 (8th)
1976–77	Giuseppe Dal Molin	Andrea Pavani	Giancarlo Valt	Enea Pavani		WCC 1977 (7th)
1977–78	Giuseppe Dal Molin	Giancarlo Valt	Enea Pavani	Ivo Lorenzi		ECC 1977 (4th)
1978–79	Giuseppe Dal Molin	Enea Pavani	Giancarlo Valt	Andrea Pavani		ECC 1978 (6th)
1978–79	Giuseppe Dal Molin	Andrea Pavani	Giancarlo Valt	Enea Pavani		WCC 1979 (8th)
1979–80	Giuseppe Dal Molin	Andrea Pavani	Giancarlo Valt	Enea Pavani		ECC 1979 (bronze)
1979–80	Andrea Pavani (fourth)	Giuseppe Dal Molin (skip)	Giancarlo Valt	Enea Pavani		WCC 1980 (7th)
1980–81	Andrea Pavani (fourth)	Giuseppe Dal Molin (skip)	Giancarlo Valt	Enea Pavani		WCC 1981 (7th)
1981–82	Andrea Pavani	Giancarlo Valt	Enrico Alberti	Enea Pavani		WCC 1982 (6th)
1985–86	Andrea Pavani	Franco Sovilla	Fabio Alverà	Stefano Morona	Enea Pavani	WCC 1986 (10th)

== Personal life ==
His children, son Andrea Pavani and daughter Marina Pavani, are also a curlers and multi-time Italian curling champions.
