= Susanne Gynning-Ödling =

Swedish curler (born 1950)

Susanne Gynning-Ödlund
- Curler ♀
- Born: 20 May 1950 (age 76)

Team
- Curling club: Amatörföreningens CK, Stockholm

Curling career
- Member Association: Sweden
- World Championship: 1 (1979)
- European Championship: 1 (1979)
Medal record
Curling
World championships
Silver medal – second place	1979 Perth
European Championships
Silver medal – second place	1979 Varese
Swedish Women's Championship
Gold medal – first place	1979

Susanne Gynning-Ödlund (born 20 May 1950) is a Swedish curler.

She is a 1979 World silver medallist and a 1979 European silver medallist.

== Teams ==
Season	Skip	Third	Second	Lead	Events
1978–79	Birgitta Törn	Katarina Hultling	Susanne Gynning-Ödlund	Gunilla Bergman	SWCC 1979 (gold); WCC 1979 (silver)
1979–80	Birgitta Törn	Katarina Hultling	Susanne Gynning-Ödlund	Gunilla Bergman	ECC 1979 (silver)
