= Tom Berggren =

Swedish male curler

- Curler ♂
- Born: 26 June 1942 (age 84)

Team
- Curling club: Sundsvalls CK, Sundsvall

Curling career
- Member Association: Sweden
- World Championship: 1 (1974)
Medal record
Curling
World Championships
| Silver medal – second place | 1974 Bern |
Swedish Men's Championship
| Gold medal – first place | 1974 |

Tom Lennart Berggren (born 26 June 1942) is a Swedish curler.

He is a 1974 World championship silver medallist and a 1974 Swedish men's curling champion.

== Teams ==
| Season | Skip | Third | Second | Lead | Events |
|---|---|---|---|---|---|
| 1973–74 | Jan Ullsten | Tom Berggren | Anders Grahn | Roger Bredin | SMCC 1974 (gold); WCC 1974 (silver) |

== Personal life ==
His son Niklas is a curler as well. He played for Sweden in four World Men's championships.
