= Bill Jenkins (curler) =

Canadian curler (1957–2025)

- Born: February 19, 1957
- Died: September 20, 2025 (aged 68)
- Education: University of Prince Edward Island
- Occupation: curler
- Years active: 1967–2009
- Spouse: Elizabeth
- Children: 5
- Parents: Kenneth Jenkins (father); Doris "Dawdy" (Peters) Jenkins (mother)

Bill Jenkins
Medal record

Men's Curling

Representing Canada

World Junior Curling Championships
Gold medal – first place	1977 Sainte-Foy	

William Kenneth Jenkins (February 19, 1957 – September 20, 2025) was a Canadian curler.

== Early life ==
Jenkins was born on February 19, 1957, the son of Kenneth and Doris "Dawdy" Jenkins (Peters).

== Career ==
=== Juniors ===
Jenkins began curling in the 1967–68 season. In 1972, he teamed up with Alan Mayhew, Sandy Stewart and John Scales to form a junior rink. After finishing runners up at the 1973 Prince Edward Island schoolboy championship, the team won the title in 1974. They went on to represent the province at the 1974 Canadian Schoolboy Championship (now called the Canadian Under-20 Curling Championships), where they went 3–7. The team won another provincial title in 1975, and improved their record at the national Schoolboys, finishing 6–5. They won a third provincial title in 1976, and then went on to win the national Schoolboy Championship that season. The team finished the round robin with a 10–3 record, in a three-way tie. The team then defeated Nova Scotia and Alberta in a tiebreaker to claim the title. It was the first schoolboy title for the province. Along with the title, Jenkins won the event's sportsmanship trophy.

The team then went on to represent Canada at the 1977 World Junior Curling Championships. There, they finished the round robin with a 5–4 record, in a three-way tie for the final playoff spot. The team then beat France and Switzerland to qualify for the semifinal. They then beat the United States in the semifinal, then Sweden in the final to claim the gold medal. At the time, the team represented the University of Prince Edward Island. When the team returned to Charlottetown after their victory, they were escorted through the city in a motorcade, and were greeted by Premier Alex Campbell, mayor Frank Zakem and Lieutenant Governor Gordon L. Bennett.

Months after winning the World Juniors, Jenkins and his rink were inducted into the PEI Sports Hall of Fame.

=== Men's and seniors ===
Following his junior career, Jenkins stopped curling for a number of years. He moved to Newfoundland in 1991, where he started a consulting business. He won the Newfoundland men's championship in 1995 with teammates Joe Power, Paul Harvey, and Ken Peddigrew. The team represented Newfoundland at the 1995 Labatt Brier, Canada's national men's championship. There, he led his rink to a 2–9 record.

In 2002, Jenkins was a late addition Mark Noseworthy rink when Noseworthy's third, Randy Perry had to deal with a family emergency. Jenkins joined the team prior to playdowns, and the team went on to win the provincial title. At the 2002 Nokia Brier, the team went 4–7.

Jenkins, with teammates Glenn Turpin, Bob Nugent and Jerry Oxford won a provincial senior men's title in 2009. He led the team to a 6–5 record at the 2009 Canadian Senior Curling Championships.

== Personal life and death ==
Jenkins majored in business at the University of Prince Edward Island. He was married to Elizabeth and worked as an insurance consultant. He had five children. He died in St. John's, Newfoundland and Labrador on September 20, 2025, at the age of 68.
