= Beth Lindsay =

Scottish curler

- Curler ♀

Team
- Curling club: Ayr CC, Ayr

Curling career
- Member Association: Scotland
- World Championship: 1 (1979)
- European Championship: 2 (1975, 1979)
Medal record
Curling
World Championships
Bronze medal – third place	1979 Perth
European Championships
Gold medal – first place	1975 Megève
Bronze medal – third place	1979 Varese
Scottish Women's Championship
Gold medal – first place	1979

Beth Lindsay is a former Scottish curler.

She was a champion of the first-ever European Curling Championships, played in 1975, a 1979 World championship bronze medallist and a Scottish women's curling champion.

== Teams ==
Season	Skip	Third	Second	Lead	Events
1975–76	Betty Law	Jessie Whiteford	Beth Lindsay	Isobel Ross	ECC 1975 (gold)
1978–79	Beth Lindsay	Ann McKellar	Jeanette Johnston	May Taylor	SWCC 1979 (gold); WCC 1979 (bronze)
1979–80	Beth Lindsay	Ann McKellar	Jeanette Johnston	May Taylor	ECC 1979 (bronze)
