= Anders Grahn (curler) =

Swedish male curler

- Curler ♂
- Born: 11 June 1958 (age 68)

Team
- Curling club: Sundsvalls CK, Sundsvall

Curling career
- Member Association: Sweden
- World Championship: 2 (1974, 1979)
- Other appearances: World Junior Championships: 3 (1975, 1976, 1977)
Medal record
Curling
World Championships
| Silver medal – second place | 1974 Bern |
Swedish Men's Championship
| Gold medal – first place | 1974 |
| Gold medal – first place | 1979 |
World Junior Championships
| Gold medal – first place | 1975 East York |
| Silver medal – second place | 1976 Aviemore |
| Silver medal – second place | 1977 Quebec City |

Lars Anders Grahn (born 11 June 1958) is a Swedish curler.

He is a 1974 World championship silver medallist and a two-time Swedish men's curling champion (1974, 1979).

== Teams ==
| Season | Skip | Third | Second | Lead | Events |
|---|---|---|---|---|---|
| 1973–74 | Jan Ullsten | Tom Berggren | Anders Grahn | Roger Bredin | SMCC 1974 (gold); WCC 1974 (silver) |
| 1974–75 | Jan Ullsten | Mats Nyberg | Anders Grahn | Bo Söderström | SJCC 1975 (gold); WJCC 1975 (gold) |
| 1975–76 | Jan Ullsten | Mats Nyberg | Anders Grahn | Bo Söderström | SJCC 1976 (gold); WJCC 1976 (silver) |
| 1976–77 | Anders Grahn | Mats Nyberg | Bo Söderström | Bo-Göran Strömberg | SJCC 1977 (gold); WJCC 1977 (silver) |
| 1978–79 | Anders Grahn (fourth) | Ken Bruneflod | Karl-Erik Bruneflod (skip) | Roger Bredin | SMCC 1979 (gold); WCC 1979 (7th) |
