= 1975 World Junior Curling Championships =

Curling championship held in Canada

- Host city: East York, Ontario, Canada
- Dates: February 25 – March 1
- Men's winner: Sweden (1st title)
- Curling club: Sundsvalls CK, Sundsvall
- Skip: Jan Ullsten
- Third: Mats Nyberg
- Second: Anders Grahn
- Lead: Bo Söderström
- Finalist: Canada (Robb King)

The 1975 World Junior Curling Championships were held from February 25 to March 1 at the East York Curling Club in East York, Ontario, Canada. The tournament only consisted of a men's event.

== Teams ==
Country	Skip	Third	Second	Lead	Curling club
Canada	Robb King	Brad Hannah	Bill Fowlis	Chris King	
France	Claude Feige	Jean-Louis Sibuet	Christian Marin-Pache	Marc Sibuet	Mont d'Arbois CC, Megève
West Germany	Hans Dieter Kiesel	Rainer Schöpp	Peter Lessinger	Roland Liedtke	
Italy	Massimo Alvera	Antonio Colli	Marco Lorenzi	Fabio Bovolenta	Cortina CC, Cortina d'Ampezzo
Norway	Morten Sørum	Bjørn Skutbergaveen	Hans Bekkelund	Dagfinn Loen	Brumunddal CC, Oslo
Scotland	Peter J. D. Wilson	Andrew McQuistin	Neale McQuistin	John Sharp	Limeline CC, Stranraer
Sweden	Jan Ullsten	Mats Nyberg	Anders Grahn	Bo Söderström	Sundsvalls CK, Sundsvall
Switzerland	René Geisser	Peter Bösch	Nick Gartermann	Felix Trueb	
United States	Steve Penencello	Rick Novak	Ben Gardeski	Ken Baher	

== Round robin ==
Place	Team	1	2	3	4	5	6	7	8	9	Wins	Losses
1	Canada	*	8:4	6:3	8:3	5:3	12:4	4:3	12:5	12:2	8	0
2	Sweden	4:8	*	8:7	6:2	6:7	10:3	9:3	14:4	15:9	6	2
3	Scotland	3:6	7:8	*	7:5	8:6	5:10	8:4	10:8	10:7	5	3
4	Norway	3:8	2:6	5:7	*	5:4	4:3	8:3	7:5	11:3	5	3
5	United States	3:5	7:6	6:8	4:5	*	10:5	15:7	11:1	12:2	5	3
6	Switzerland	4:12	3:10	10:5	3:4	5:10	*	7:6	4:7	10:7	3	5
7	West Germany	3:4	3:9	4:8	3:8	7:15	6:7	*	18:7	10:5	2	6
8	France	5:12	4:14	8:10	5:7	1:11	7:4	7:18	*	12:4	2	6
9	Italy	2:12	9:15	7:10	3:11	2:12	7:10	5:10	4:12	*	0	8

Team to final
Teams to semifinal

== Playoffs ==
Semifinal			Gold Medal Game
			1	Canada	6
2	Sweden	9		Sweden	8
3	Scotland	8

== Final standings ==
Place	Team	Games played	Wins	Losses
1st place, gold medalist(s)	Sweden	10	8	2
2nd place, silver medalist(s)	Canada	9	8	1
3rd place, bronze medalist(s)	Scotland	9	5	4
4	Norway	8	5	3
5	United States	8	5	3
6	Switzerland	8	3	5
7	West Germany	8	2	6
8	France	8	2	6
9	Italy	8	0	8

== Awards ==
- WJCC Sportsmanship Award: (France) Claude Feige

All-Star Team:

- Skip: (Canada) Robb King
- Third: (Canada) Brad Hannah
- Second: (Sweden) Anders Grahn
- Lead: (Canada) Chris King
