= Anders Thidholm =

Swedish male curler

- Curler ♂
- Other names: Anton
- Born: 4 April 1954 (age 72); Härnösand

Team
- Curling club: Härnösands CK, Härnösand

Curling career
- Member Association: Sweden
- World Championship: 1 (1981)
- European Championship: 2 (1978, 1979)
- Olympic: 1 (1988; demo)
Medal record
Curling
European Championships
Silver medal – second place	1978 Aviemore
Silver medal – second place	1979 Varese
Swedish Men's Championship
Gold medal – first place	1981

Per Anders "Anton" Thidholm (born 4 April 1954 in Härnösand) is a Swedish curler and curling coach, a two-time European championship silver medallist (1978, 1979) and a 1981 Swedish men's curling champion.

He participated in the demonstration event at the 1988 Winter Olympics, when the Swedish team finished at fifth place.

In 1978 he was inducted into the Swedish Curling Hall of Fame.

== Teams ==
Season	Skip	Third	Second	Lead	Alternate	Events
1973–74	Anders Thidholm	Ragnar Kamp	Christer Mårtensson	Björn Rudström		SJCC 1974 (gold); WJCC 1974 (bronze) (unofficial)
1974–75	Axel Kamp	Ragnar Kamp	Björn Rudström	Anders Thidholm		
1977–78	Bertil Timan	Anders Thidholm	Ante Nilsson	Hans Söderström		
1978–79	Anders Thidholm (fourth)	Hans Söderström	Anders Nilsson	Bertil Timan (skip)		ECC 1978 (silver)
1979–80	Jan Ullsten	Anders Thidholm	Anders Nilsson	Hans Söderström	Bertil Timan	ECC 1979 (silver)
1980–81	Jan Ullsten	Anders Thidholm	Anders Nilsson	Hans Söderström		SMCC 1981 (gold); WCC 1981 (5th)
1987–88	Dan-Ola Eriksson	Anders Thidholm	Jonas Sjölander	Christer Nylund	Sören Grahn	WOG 1988 (5th)

== Record as a coach of national teams ==
Year	Tournament, event	National team	Place
1994	1994 European Curling Championships	Finland (men)	9
1995	1995 European Curling Championships	Sweden (men)	7
