= Roger Bredin =

Swedish male curler

- Curler ♂
- Born: 5 March 1953 (age 73)

Team
- Curling club: Sundsvalls CK, Sundsvall

Curling career
- Member Association: Sweden
- World Championship: 2 (1974, 1979)
Medal record
Curling
World Championships
Silver medal – second place	1974 Bern
Swedish Men's Championship
Gold medal – first place	1974
Gold medal – first place	1979

Bengt Roger Bredin (born 5 March 1953) is a Swedish curler.

He is a 1974 World championship silver medallist and a two-time Swedish men's curling champion (1974, 1979).

== Teams ==
Season	Skip	Third	Second	Lead	Events
1973–74	Jan Ullsten	Tom Berggren	Anders Grahn	Roger Bredin	SMCC 1974 (gold); WCC 1974 (silver)
1978–79	Anders Grahn (fourth)	Ken Bruneflod	Karl-Erik Bruneflod (skip)	Roger Bredin	SMCC 1979 (gold); WCC 1979 (7th)
