= Ann McKellar =

Scottish curler

- Curler ♀

Team
- Curling club: Ayr CC, Ayr

Curling career
- Member Association: Scotland
- World Championship: 1 (1979)
- European Championship: 1 (1979)
Medal record
Curling
World Championships
Bronze medal – third place	1979 Perth
European Championships
Bronze medal – third place	1979 Varese
Scottish Women's Championship
Gold medal – first place	1979

Ann McKellar is a Scottish curler.

She is a 1979 World bronze medallist and 1979 European bronze medallist.

== Teams ==
Season	Skip	Third	Second	Lead	Events
1978–79	Beth Lindsay	Ann McKellar	Jeanette Johnston	May Taylor	SWCC 1979 (gold); WCC 1979 (bronze)
1979–80	Beth Lindsay	Ann McKellar	Jeanette Johnston	May Taylor	ECC 1979 (bronze)
