= Ken Bruneflod =

Swedish male curler

- Curler ♂
- Born: 16 January 1947 (age 79)

Team
- Curling club: Sundsvalls CK, Sundsvall

Curling career
- Member Association: Sweden
- World Championship: 1 (1979)
Medal record
Curling
Swedish Men's Championship
Gold medal – first place	1979

Ken Bruneflod (born 16 January 1947) is a Swedish curler.

He is a 1979 Swedish men's curling champion.

== Teams ==
Season	Skip	Third	Second	Lead	Events
1978–79	Anders Grahn (fourth)	Ken Bruneflod	Karl-Erik Bruneflod (skip)	Roger Bredin	SMCC 1979 (gold); WCC 1979 (7th)

== Personal life ==
His father was Swedish curler Karl-Erik Bruneflod. They played together at the 1979 World championship.
