= Franco Sovilla =

Italian male curler

- Curler ♂
- Born: 8 August 1957 (age 69); Venice, Italy

Team
- Curling club: CC Cortina, Cortina d'Ampezzo, CC Tofane, Cortina d'Ampezzo

Curling career
- Member Association: Italy
- World Championship: 5 (1983, 1984, 1985, 1986, 1990)
- European Championship: 7 (1981, 1983, 1984, 1985, 1986, 1989, 1992)
- Other appearances: World Junior Championships: 4 (1976, 1977, 1978, 1979), World Senior Championship: 1 (2012)
Medal record
Curling

Franco Sovilla (born 8 August 1957 in Venice, Italy) is an Italian curler.

== Teams ==
Season	Skip	Third	Second	Lead	Alternate	Coach	Events
1975–76	Massimo Alverà	Franco Sovilla	Fabio Bovolenta	Marco Lorenzi			WJCC 1976 (10th)
1976–77	Massimo Alverà	Franco Sovilla	Fabio Bovolenta	Stefano Morona			WJCC 1977 (8th)
1977–78	Massimo Alverà	Franco Sovilla	Stefano Morona	Dennis Ghezze			WJCC 1978 (10th)
1978–79	Massimo Alverà	Franco Sovilla	Stefano Morona	Dennis Ghezze			WJCC 1979 (8th)
1981–82	Giuseppe Dal Molin	Massimo Alverà	Franco Sovilla	Claudio Alverà			ECC 1981 (8th)
1982–83	Massimo Alverà (fourth)	Franco Sovilla	Giuseppe Dal Molin (skip)	Stefano Morona			WCC 1983 (10th)
1983–84	Andrea Pavani	Franco Sovilla	Giancarlo Valt	Stefano Morona			ECC 1983 (9th); WCC 1984 (8th)
1984–85	Andrea Pavani	Franco Sovilla	Giancarlo Valt	Stefano Morona			ECC 1984 (9th); WCC 1985 (7th)
1985–86	Andrea Pavani	Franco Sovilla	Fabio Alverà	Stefano Morona	Enea Pavani (WCC)		ECC 1985 (12th); WCC 1986 (10th)
1986–87	Andrea Pavani	Franco Sovilla	Fabio Alverà	Stefano Morona			ECC 1986 (4th)
1989–90	Andrea Pavani	Fabio Alverà	Franco Sovilla	Stefano Morona	Stefano Zardini (WCC)		ECC 1989 (9th); WCC 1990 (9th)
1992–93	Fabio Alverà	Franco Sovilla	Stefano Morona	Stefano Zardini			ECC 1992 (14th)
2011–12	Antonio Menardi	Fabio Alverà	Giorgio Alberti	Stefano Morona	Franco Sovilla	Valerio Constantini	WSCC 2012 (12th)
