= Anders Nilsson (curler) =

Swedish male curler

- Curler ♂
- Other names: Ante
- Born: 9 June 1957 (age 69)

Team
- Curling club: Härnösands CK, Härnösand

Curling career
- Member Association: Sweden
- World Championship: 2 (1981, 1986)
- European Championship: 2 (1978, 1979)
Medal record
Curling
European Championships
Silver medal – second place	1978 Aviemore
Silver medal – second place	1979 Varese
Swedish Men's Championship
Gold medal – first place	1981

Anders Torbjörn "Ante" Nilsson (born 9 June 1957) is a Swedish curler, a two-time European championship silver medallist (1978, 1979) and a 1981 Swedish men's curling champion.

In 1982 he was inducted into the Swedish Curling Hall of Fame.

== Teams ==
Season	Skip	Third	Second	Lead	Alternate	Events
1977–78	Bertil Timan	Anders Thidholm	Ante Nilsson	Hans Söderström		
1978–79	Anders Thidholm (fourth)	Hans Söderström	Anders Nilsson	Bertil Timan (skip)		ECC 1978 (silver)
1979–80	Jan Ullsten	Anders Thidholm	Anders Nilsson	Hans Söderström	Bertil Timan	ECC 1979 (silver)
1980–81	Jan Ullsten	Anders Thidholm	Anders Nilsson	Hans Söderström		SMCC 1981 (gold); WCC 1981 (5th)
1985–86	Stefan Hasselborg	Mikael Hasselborg	Hans Nordin	Lars Wernblom	Anders Nilsson	WCC 1986 (4th)
