= Giancarlo Valt =

Italian male curler

- Curler ♂
- Born: 7 May 1941 (age 85); Cortina d'Ampezzo, Italy

Team
- Curling club: CC Tofane, Cortina d'Ampezzo

Curling career
- Member Association: Italy
- World Championship: 7 (1977, 1979, 1980, 1981, 1982, 1984, 1985)
- European Championship: 6 (1977, 1978, 1979, 1982, 1983, 1984)
Medal record
Curling
European Championships
Bronze medal – third place	1979 Varese

Giancarlo Valt (born 7 May 1941 in Cortina d'Ampezzo, Italy) is an Italian curler.

At the international level, he is a 1979 European bronze medallist.

At the national level, he is a six-time Italian men's champion curler (1979, 1980, 1981, 1982, 1984, 1985).

== Teams ==
Season	Skip	Third	Second	Lead	Events
1976–77	Giuseppe Dal Molin	Andrea Pavani	Giancarlo Valt	Enea Pavani	WCC 1977 (7th)
1977–78	Giuseppe Dal Molin	Giancarlo Valt	Enea Pavani	Ivo Lorenzi	ECC 1977 (4th)
1978–79	Giuseppe Dal Molin	Enea Pavani	Giancarlo Valt	Andrea Pavani	ECC 1978 (6th)
1978–79	Giuseppe Dal Molin	Andrea Pavani	Giancarlo Valt	Enea Pavani	WCC 1979 (8th)
1979–80	Giuseppe Dal Molin	Andrea Pavani	Giancarlo Valt	Enea Pavani	ECC 1979 (bronze)
1979–80	Andrea Pavani (fourth)	Giuseppe Dal Molin (skip)	Giancarlo Valt	Enea Pavani	WCC 1980 (7th)
1980–81	Andrea Pavani (fourth)	Giuseppe Dal Molin (skip)	Giancarlo Valt	Enea Pavani	WCC 1981 (7th)
1981–82	Andrea Pavani	Giancarlo Valt	Enrico Alberti	Enea Pavani	WCC 1982 (6th)
1982–83	Andrea Pavani	Enrico Alberti	Giancarlo Valt	Gianantonio Gillarduzzi	ECC 1982 (13th)
1983–84	Andrea Pavani	Franco Sovilla	Giancarlo Valt	Stefano Morona	ECC 1983 (9th); WCC 1984 (8th)
1984–85	Andrea Pavani	Franco Sovilla	Giancarlo Valt	Stefano Morona	ECC 1984 (9th); WCC 1985 (7th)
