= 1979 Air Canada Silver Broom =

Mens World Curling Championship in 1979

- Host city: Bern, Switzerland
- Arena: Allmend Eisstadion
- Dates: March 26 – April 1, 1979
- Winner: Norway
- Curling club: Bygdøy CC, Oslo
- Skip: Kristian Sørum
- Third: Morten Sørum
- Second: Eigil Ramsfjell
- Lead: Gunnar Meland
- Finalist: Switzerland (Peter Attinger, Jr.)

The 1979 Air Canada Silver Broom, the men's world curling championship, was held from March 26–April 1 at the Allmend Eisstadion in Bern, Switzerland.

== Teams ==
Canada	Denmark	France	Germany	Italy
Deer Lodge CC, Winnipeg, Manitoba Skip: Barry Fry; Third: Bill Carey; Second: Gordon Sparkes; Lead: Bryan Wood	Hvidovre CC, Hvidovre Skip: Jørn Blach; Third: Freddy Bartelsen; Second: Bent Jørgensen; Lead: Antonny Hinge	Mont d'Arbois CC, Megève Skip: Georges Mangier; Third: Pierre Saas; Second: René Robert; Lead: Gérard Wendling	Munchener EV, Munich Skip: Keith Wendorf; Third: Balint von Bery; Second: Sascha Fischer-Weppler; Lead: Heino von L'Estocq	Tofane CC, Cortina d'Ampezzo Skip: Giuseppe Dal Molin; Third: Andrea Pavani; Second: Giancarlo Valt; Lead: Enea Pavani
Norway	Scotland	Sweden	Switzerland	United States
Bygdøy CC, Oslo Skip: Kristian Sørum; Third: Morten Sørum; Second: Eigil Ramsfjell; Lead: Gunnar Meland	Hamilton & Thornyhill CC, Hamilton Skip: Jimmy Waddell; Third: Willie Frame; Second: Jim Forrest; Lead: George Bryan	Sundsvalls CK Fourth: Anders Grahn; Third: Ken Bruneflod; Skip: Karl-Erik Bruneflod; Lead: Roger Bredin	Dübendorf CC Skip: Peter Attinger, Jr. Third: Bernhard Attinger; Second: Mattias Neuenschwander; Lead: Ruedi Attinger	Bemidji CC, Bemidji, Minnesota Skip: Scott Baird; Third: Dan Haluptzok; Second: Mark Haluptzok; Lead: Bob Fenson

== Round-robin standings ==
Key
Teams to playoffs
Teams to tiebreaker

Country	Skip	W	L
Switzerland	Peter Attinger, Jr.	7	2
Norway	Kristian Sørum	6	3
Canada	Barry Fry	6	3
United States	Scott Baird	6	3
Germany	Keith Wendorf	6	3
Scotland	Jimmy Waddell	5	4
Sweden	Karl-Erik Bruneflod	3	6
Italy	Giuseppe Dal Molin	3	6
France	Georges Magnier	2	7
Denmark	Jørn Blach	1	8

== Round-robin results ==
=== Draw 1 ===
Team	Final
United States (Baird)	8
France (Magnier)	3

Team	Final
Switzerland (Attinger)	7
Italy (Dal Molin)	4

Team	Final
Norway (Sørum)	4
Denmark (Blach)	3

Team	Final
Scotland (Waddell)	4
Canada (Fry)	3

Team	Final
Germany (Wendorf)	12
Sweden (Bruneflod)	3

=== Draw 2 ===
Team	Final
Germany (Wendorf)	6
Switzerland (Attinger)	5

Team	Final
Sweden (Bruneflod)	7
Scotland (Waddell)	6

Team	Final
United States (Baird)	11
Italy (Dal Molin)	5

Team	Final
France (Magnier)	6
Denmark (Blach)	4

Team	Final
Norway (Sørum)	6
Canada (Fry)	4

=== Draw 3 ===
Team	Final
Norway (Sørum)	8
Sweden (Bruneflod)	5

Team	Final
Canada (Fry)	6
France (Magnier)	4

Team	Final
Switzerland (Attinger)	10
Scotland (Waddell)	7

Team	Final
United States (Baird)	9
Germany (Wendorf)	6

Team	Final
Italy (Dal Molin)	8
Denmark (Blach)	3

=== Draw 4 ===
Team	Final
Scotland (Waddell)	12
Denmark (Blach)	3

Team	Final
Norway (Sørum)	6
United States (Baird)	5

Team	Final
Canada (Fry)	6
Germany (Wendorf)	3

Team	Final
Sweden (Bruneflod)	10
Italy (Dal Molin)	2

Team	Final
France (Magnier)	7
Switzerland (Attinger)	4

=== Draw 5 ===
Team	Final
Canada (Fry)	6
Italy (Dal Molin)	4

Team	Final
Scotland (Waddell)	5
France (Magnier)	3

Team	Final
Switzerland (Attinger)	5
Denmark (Blach)	2

Team	Final
Germany (Wendorf)	9
Norway (Sørum)	6

Team	Final
United States (Baird)	9
Sweden (Bruneflod)	2

=== Draw 6 ===
Team	Final
Switzerland (Attinger)	4
United States (Baird)	3

Team	Final
Germany (Wendorf)	8
Italy (Dal Molin)	4

Team	Final
Norway (Sørum)	6
Scotland (Waddell)	5

Team	Final
Sweden (Bruneflod)	10
France (Magnier)	4

Team	Final
Canada (Fry)	9
Denmark (Blach)	4

=== Draw 7 ===
Team	Final
Canada (Fry)	6
Sweden (Bruneflod)	5

Team	Final
Switzerland (Attinger)	5
Norway (Sørum)	4

Team	Final
Italy (Dal Molin)	6
France (Magnier)	3

Team	Final
United States (Baird)	8
Denmark (Blach)	2

Team	Final
Scotland (Waddell)	7
Germany (Wendorf)	5

=== Draw 8 ===
Team	Final
Germany (Wendorf)	8
Denmark (Blach)	5

Team	Final
Canada (Fry)	6
United States (Baird)	4

Team	Final
Switzerland (Attinger)	7
Sweden (Bruneflod)	6

Team	Final
Scotland (Waddell)	7
Italy (Dal Molin)	4

Team	Final
Norway (Sørum)	6
France (Magnier)	1

=== Draw 9 ===
Team	Final
Italy (Dal Molin)	7
Norway (Sørum)	6

Team	Final
Denmark (Blach)	5
Sweden (Bruneflod)	4

Team	Final
Germany (Wendorf)	7
France (Magnier)	4

Team	Final
Switzerland (Attinger)	6
Canada (Fry)	5

Team	Final
United States (Baird)	5
Scotland (Waddell)	4

== Tiebreakers ==
=== Tiebreaker 1 ===
Team	Final
Canada (Fry)	8
United States (Baird)	4

Team	Final
Norway (Sørum)	6
Germany (Wendorf)	5

=== Tiebreaker 2 ===
Team	Final
Germany (Wendorf)	7
United States (Baird)	4

== Playoffs ==
Semifinals
1	Switzerland	9
4	Germany	5
2	Norway	6
3	Canada	3

Final
1	Switzerland	4
2	Norway	5

=== Semifinals ===
Team	Final
Norway (Sørum)	6
Canada (Fry)	3

Team	Final
Switzerland (Attinger)	9
Germany (Wendorf)	5

=== Final ===
Team	Final
Norway (Sørum)	5
Switzerland (Attinger)	4

1979 Air Canada Silver Broom
(Norway)
Norway
1st title
