= Jimmy Waddell =

Scottish male curler

- Curler ♂

Team
- Curling club: Hamilton & Thornyhill CC

Curling career
- Member Association: Scotland
- World Championship: 4 (1964, 1972, 1974, 1979)
- European Championship: 1 (1979)
Medal record
Curling
World Championships
Silver medal – second place	1964 Calgary
European Championships
Gold medal – first place	1979 Varese
Scottish Men's Championship
Gold medal – first place	1964 Edinburgh
Gold medal – first place	1972
Gold medal – first place	1974
Gold medal – first place	1979

James Waddell (born c. 1937) is a Scottish curler. He is a 1979 European champion and a 1964 World championship silver medallist.

Waddell and the entirety of his 1964 Scottish champion rink were farmers from Hamilton.

== Teams ==
=== Men's ===
Season	Skip	Third	Second	Lead	Events
1963–64	Alex F. Torrance	Alex A. Torrance	Robert Kirkland	Jimmy Waddell	SMCC 1964 (gold); WCC 1964 (silver)
1971–72	Alex F. Torrance	Alex A. Torrance	Robert Kirkland	Jimmy Waddell	SMCC 1972 (gold); WCC 1972 (4th)
1973–74	Jimmy Waddell	Jim Steele	Robert Kirkland	Willie Frame	SMCC 1974 (gold); WCC 1974 (8th)
1978–79	Jimmy Waddell	Willie Frame	Jim Forrest	George Bryan	SMCC 1979 (gold); WCC 1979 (6th)
1979–80	Jimmy Waddell	Willie Frame	Jim Forrest	George Bryan	ECC 1979 (gold)

=== Mixed ===
Season	Skip	Third	Second	Lead	Events
1987	Jim Waddell	Isobel Waddell	Alec Torrance	Isobel Torrance	SMxCC 1987 (gold)

== Private life ==
His grandson Kyle is a curler too, a 2013 World Junior champion and a 2017 European Championships silver medallist. Another grandson Craig is also a curler, and the brothers played together in the 2019 European Championships.
