= Iben Larsen =

Danish curler

- Curler ♀

Team
- Curling club: Hvidovre CC, Hvidovre

Curling career
- Member Association: Denmark
- World Championship: 3 (1979, 1983, 1984)
- European Championship: 1 (1982)
- Other appearances: World Senior Championships: 1 (2012)
Medal record
Curling
Danish Women's Championship
Gold medal – first place	1979
Gold medal – first place	1983
Gold medal – first place	1984

Iben Larsen is a Danish former curler.

At the international level, she was the skip of the first Danish national women's team at the World championship in 1979.

At the national level, she is a three-time Danish women's champion curler (1979, 1983, 1984).

== Teams ==
Season	Skip	Third	Second	Lead	Alternate	Coach	Events
1978–79	Iben Larsen	Mariane Jørgensen	Astrid Birnbaum	Helena Blach			DWCC 1979 (gold)
1978–79	Iben Larsen	Astrid Birnbaum	Mariane Jørgensen	Helena Blach			WCC 1979 (7th)
1982–83	Jane Bidstrup	Iben Larsen	Mai-Brit Rejnholdt	Kirsten Hur			ECC 1982 (6th); DWCC 1983 (gold); WCC 1983 (7th)
1983–84	Jane Bidstrup	Mai-Brit Rejnholdt	Hanne Olsen	Iben Larsen			DWCC 1983 (gold)
1983–84	Jane Bidstrup	Iben Larsen	Mai-Brit Rejnholdt-Christensen	Kirsten Hur			WCC 1984 (5th)
2011–12	Jane Bidstrup	Iben Larsen	Lilian Nielsen	Lone Bagge Harry	Mai Greulich	Poul Erik Nielsen	WSCC 2012 (9th)
