= Nella Alverà =

Italian curler

- Curler ♀
- Born: 9 December 1930 (age 95); Cortina d'Ampezzo

Team
- Curling club: CC Cortina, Cortina d'Ampezzo, CC 66 Cortina, Cortina d'Ampezzo

Curling career
- Member Association: Italy
- World Championship: 5 (1979, 1980, 1983, 1984, 1985)
- European Championship: 5 (1975, 1982, 1983, 1984, 1985)
Medal record
Curling
European Championships
Silver medal – second place	1982 Kirkcaldy

Nella Alverà (born 9 December 1930 in Cortina d'Ampezzo) is an Italian curler.

At the international level, she is a 1982 European silver medallist. She competed in 5 World and 5 European championships.

== Teams ==
Season	Skip	Third	Second	Lead	Events
1975–76	Nella Alverà	Maria-Grazzia Constantini	Marina Pavani	Tea Valt	ECC 1975 (6th)
1978–79	Nella Alverà	Paola Zardini	Lidia Cavallini	Loredana Da Giau	WCC 1979 (10th)
1979–80	Maria-Grazzia Constantini	Nella Alverà	Marina Pavani	Ann Lacedelli	WCC 1980 (5th)
1982–83	Maria-Grazzia Constantini	Ann Lacedelli	Nella Alverà	Angela Constantini	ECC 1982 (silver); WCC 1983 (9th)
1983–84	Maria-Grazzia Constantini	Tea Valt	Nella Alverà	Angela Constantini	ECC 1983 (9th); WCC 1984 (10th)
1984–85	Maria-Grazzia Constantini	Tea Valt	Nella Alverà	Angela Constantini	ECC 1984 (4th); WCC 1985 (10th)
1985–86	Maria-Grazzia Constantini	Angela Constantini	Tea Valt	Nella Alverà	ECC 1985 (8th)
