= Enrico Alberti =

Italian male curler

- Curler ♂
- Born: 24 May 1947 (age 79); Cortina d'Ampezzo, Italy

Team
- Curling club: CC Tofane, Cortina d'Ampezzo, CC Dolomiti, Cortina d'Ampezzo

Curling career
- Member Association: Italy
- World Championship: 1 (1982)
- European Championship: 1 (1982)
- Other appearances: World Senior Championships: 2 (2003, 2005)
Medal record
Curling
Italian Men's Championship
Gold medal – first place	1982

Enrico Alberti (born 24 May 1947 in Cortina d'Ampezzo, Italy) is an Italian curler.

At the national level, he is a 1982 Italian men's champion curler.

== Teams ==
Season	Skip	Third	Second	Lead	Alternate	Events
1981–82	Andrea Pavani	Giancarlo Valt	Enrico Alberti	Enea Pavani		WCC 1982 (6th)
1982–83	Andrea Pavani	Enrico Alberti	Giancarlo Valt	Gianantonio Gillarduzzi		ECC 1982 (13th)
2002–03	Dino Zardini	Enrico Alberti	Valerio Constantini	Gianantonio Gillarduzzi		WSCC 2003 (9th)
2004–05	Dino Zardini	Enrico Alberti	Roberto Fassina	Valerio Constantini	Angelo Pezzin	WSCC 2005 (13th)
