= Birgitta Törn =

Swedish female curler (born 1948)

- Curler ♀
- Other names: Gittan
- Born: 11 June 1948 (age 78)

Team
- Curling club: Amatörföreningens CK, Stockholm, Stocksunds CK, Stockholm

Curling career
- Member Association: Sweden
- World Championship: 1 (1979)
- European Championship: 1 (1979)
- Other appearances: World Senior Championships: 10 (2004, 2005, 2006, 2007, 2008, 2010, 2011, 2012, 2013, 2014)
Medal record
Curling
World championships
Silver medal – second place	1979 Perth
European Championships
Silver medal – second place	1979 Varese
Swedish Women's Championship
Gold medal – first place	1979
World Senior Championships
Gold medal – first place	2006 Copenhagen
Gold medal – first place	2007 Edmonton
Silver medal – second place	2004 Gävle
Silver medal – second place	2011 St. Paul
Bronze medal – third place	2005 Greenacres
Bronze medal – third place	2010 Chelyabinsk
Bronze medal – third place	2012 Tårnby
Bronze medal – third place	2013 Fredericton

Birgitta "Gittan" Törn (born 11 June 1948) is a Swedish curler.

She is a 1979 World silver medallist and a 1979 European silver medallist.

In 1980 she was inducted into the Swedish Curling Hall of Fame.

== Teams ==
=== Women's ===
Season	Skip	Third	Second	Lead	Alternate	Coach	Events
1978–79	Birgitta Törn	Katarina Hultling	Susanne Gynning-Ödling	Gunilla Bergman			SWCC 1979 (gold); WCC 1979 (silver)
1979–80	Birgitta Törn	Katarina Hultling	Susanne Gynning-Ödling	Gunilla Bergman			ECC 1979 (silver)
2003–04	Ingrid Meldahl	Ann-Catrin Kjerr	Inger Berg	Sylvia Malmberg	Birgitta Törn	Gunilla Bergman	WSCC 2004 (silver)
2004–05	Ingrid Meldahl	Ann-Catrin Kjerr	Inger Berg	Sylvia Malmberg	Birgitta Törn	Gunilla Bergman	WSCC 2005 (bronze)
2005–06	Ingrid Meldahl	Ann-Catrin Kjerr	Inger Berg	Sylvia Malmberg	Birgitta Törn	Gunilla Bergman	WSCC 2006 (gold)
2006–07	Ingrid Meldahl	Ann-Catrin Kjerr	Birgitta Törn	Inger Berg	Sylvia Liljefors	Gunilla Bergman	WSCC 2007 (gold)
2007–08	Ingrid Meldahl	Ann-Catrin Kjerr	Birgitta Törn	Sylvia Liljefors	Inger Berg	Gunilla Bergman	WSCC 2008 (6th)
2009–10	Ingrid Meldahl	Ann-Catrin Kjerr	Birgitta Törn	Sylvia Liljefors		Olof Liljefors	WSCC 2010 (bronze)
2010–11	Ingrid Meldahl	Ann-Catrin Kjerr	Birgitta Törn	Sylvia Liljefors		Gunilla Bergman	WSCC 2011 (silver)
2011–12	Ingrid Meldahl	Ann-Catrin Kjerr	Birgitta Törn	Sylvia Liljefors	Marie Lehander	Gunilla Bergman	WSCC 2012 (bronze)
2012–13	Ingrid Meldahl	Ann-Catrin Kjerr	Birgitta Törn	Sylvia Liljefors	Marie Lehander	Jan-Erik Kjerr	WSCC 2013 (bronze)
2013–14	Ingrid Meldahl	Ann-Catrin Kjerr	Birgitta Törn	Sylvia Liljefors	Marie Lehander	Gunilla Bergman	WSCC 2014 (4th)

=== Mixed ===
Season	Skip	Third	Second	Lead	Events
1972	Ulf Lagerbäck	Lena Egnér	Birgitta Törn	Göran Perning	SMxCC 1972 (gold)
