= 1981 Air Canada Silver Broom =

- Host city: London, Ontario, Canada
- Arena: Thompson Arena
- Dates: March 23–29, 1981
- Winner: Switzerland
- Curling club: Lausanne-Riviera CC
- Skip: Jürg Tanner
- Third: Jürg Hornisberger
- Second: Patrik Lörtscher
- Lead: Franz Tanner
- Finalist: United States (Bud Somerville)

The 1981 Air Canada Silver Broom, the men's world curling championship, was held from at the Thompson Arena in London, Ontario, Canada.

== Teams ==
Canada	Denmark	France	Germany	Italy
Assiniboine Memorial CC, Winnipeg, Manitoba Skip: Kerry Burtnyk; Third: Mark Olson; Second: Jim Spencer; Lead: Ron Kammerlock	Hvidovre CC Skip: Tommy Stjerne; Third: Oluf Olsen; Second: Steen Hansen; Lead: Peter Andersen	Megève CC, Megève Fourth: Gerard Ravello; Third: André Jouvent; Second: Jacques Joulien; Skip: Gérard Alazet	CC Schwenningen Skip: Keith Wendorf; Third: Hans Dieter Kiesel; Second: Sven Saile; Lead: Heiner Martin	Tofane CC, Cortina d'Ampezzo Fourth: Andrea Pavani; Skip: Giuseppe Dal Molin; Second: Giancarlo Valt; Lead: Enea Pavani
Norway	Scotland	Sweden	Switzerland	United States
Bygdøy CC, Oslo Skip: Kristian Sørum; Third: Eigil Ramsfjell; Second: Gunnar Meland; Lead: Dagfinn Loen	Carrington CC, Edinburgh Skip: Colin Hamilton; Third: W. Michael Dick; Second: David Ramsay; Lead: Richard Pretsel	Härnösands CK Skip: Jan Ullsten; Third: Anders Thidholm; Second: Anders Nilsson; Lead: Hans Söderström	Lausanne-Riviera CC Skip: Jürg Tanner; Third: Jürg Hornisberger; Second: Patrik Lörtscher; Lead: Franz Tanner	Superior CC, Wisconsin Fourth: Bob Nichols; Skip: Bud Somerville; Second: Bob Christman; Lead: Bob Buchanan

== Round-robin standings ==
Country	Skip	W	L
Canada	Kerry Burtnyk	8	1
Norway	Kristian Sørum	7	2
United States	Bud Somerville	6	3
Switzerland	Jürg Tanner	6	3
Sweden	Jan Ullsten	5	4
Scotland	Colin Hamilton	5	4
Italy	Giuseppe Dal Molin	3	6
Denmark	Tommy Stjerne	2	7
Germany	Keith Wendorf	2	7
France	Gérard Alazet	1	8

== Round-robin results ==
=== Draw 1 ===
Team	Final
Switzerland (Tanner)	9
France (Alazet)	4

Team	Final
Norway (Sørum)	7
Scotland (Hamilton)	3

Team	Final
Canada (Burtnyk)	11
Germany (Wendorf)	2

Team	Final
Sweden (Ullsten)	6
Italy (Dal Molin)	8

Team	Final
Denmark (Stjerne)	4
United States (Nichols)	8

=== Draw 2 ===
Team	Final
Scotland (Hamilton)	7
Sweden (Ullsten)	10

Team	Final
Germany (Wendorf)	4
Denmark (Stjerne)	6

Team	Final
Italy (Dal Molin)	5
Switzerland (Tanner)	7

Team	Final
United States (Somerville)	4
Norway (Sørum)	6

Team	Final
Canada (Burtnyk)	13
France (Alazet)	3

=== Draw 3 ===
Team	Final
Norway (Sørum)	11
Germany (Wendorf)	3

Team	Final
Canada (Burtnyk)	8
Italy (Dal Molin)	2

Team	Final
Sweden (Ullsten)	5
United States (Somerville)	7

Team	Final
France (Alazet)	3
Denmark (Stjerne)	11

Team	Final
Scotland (Hamilton)	6
Switzerland (Tanner)	4

=== Draw 4 ===
Team	Final
United States (Somerville)	4
Canada (Burtnyk)	5

Team	Final
France (Alazet)	4
Sweden (Ullsten)	17

Team	Final
Denmark (Stjerne)	6
Scotland (Hamilton)	7

Team	Final
Switzerland (Tanner)	7
Germany (Wendorf)	4

Team	Final
Norway (Sørum)	7
Italy (Dal Molin)	4

=== Draw 5 ===
Team	Final
Germany (Wendorf)	10
Italy (Dal Molin)	4

Team	Final
United States (Somerville)	6
Switzerland (Tanner)	5

Team	Final
Norway (Sørum)	5
Canada (Burtnyk)	7

Team	Final
Denmark (Stjerne)	2
Sweden (Ullsten)	9

Team	Final
France (Alazet)	3
Scotland (Hamilton)	15

=== Draw 6 ===
Team	Final
Canada (Burtnyk)	9
Scotland (Hamilton)	5

Team	Final
Denmark (Stjerne)	3
Norway (Sørum)	5

Team	Final
Switzerland (Tanner)	9
Sweden (Ullsten)	6

Team	Final
Italy (Dal Molin)	8
France (Alazet)	5

Team	Final
United States (Somerville)	5
Germany (Wendorf)	7

=== Draw 7 ===
Team	Final
Sweden (Ullsten)	6
Norway (Sørum)	7

Team	Final
Switzerland (Tanner)	3
Canada (Burtnyk)	8

Team	Final
Germany (Wendorf)	5
France (Alazet)	6

Team	Final
Scotland (Hamilton)	4
United States (Somerville)	7

Team	Final
Italy (Dal Molin)	6
Denmark (Stjerne)	5

=== Draw 8 ===
Team	Final
France (Alazet)	2
United States (Somerville)	8

Team	Final
Sweden (Ullsten)	10
Germany (Wendorf)	2

Team	Final
Scotland (Hamilton)	5
Italy (Dal Molin)	4

Team	Final
Denmark (Stjerne)	3
Canada (Burtnyk)	7

Team	Final
Switzerland (Tanner)	7
Norway (Sørum)	4

=== Draw 9 ===
Team	Final
Denmark (Stjerne)	3
Switzerland (Tanner)	9

Team	Final
Italy (Dal Molin)	4
United States (Somerville)	6

Team	Final
France (Alazet)	4
Norway (Sørum)	12

Team	Final
Germany (Wendorf)	5
Scotland (Hamilton)	6

Team	Final
Sweden (Ullsten)	9
Canada (Burtnyk)	5

== Playoffs ==
Semifinals
1	Canada	4
4	Switzerland	7
2	Norway	4
3	United States	7

Final
4	Switzerland	2
2	United States	1

=== Semifinals ===
Team	Final
Norway (Sørum)	4
United States (Somerville)	7

Team	Final
Canada (Burtnyk)	4
Switzerland (Tanner)	7

=== Final ===
Team	Final
Switzerland (Tanner)	2
United States (Somerville)	1

1981 Air Canada Silver Broom
(Switzerland)
Switzerland
2nd title
