= Jan Ullsten =

Swedish male curler

- Curler ♂
- Born: 29 November 1954 (age 71)

Team
- Curling club: Sundsvalls CK, Sundsvall, Härnösands CK, Härnösand

Curling career
- Member Association: Sweden
- World Championship: 2 (1974, 1981)
- European Championship: 1 (1979)
- Other appearances: World Junior Championships: 2 (1975, 1976), World Senior Championships: 1 (2006)
Medal record
Curling
World Championships
Silver medal – second place	1974 Bern
European Championships
Silver medal – second place	1979 Varese
Swedish Men's Championship
Gold medal – first place	1974
Gold medal – first place	1981
World Junior Championships
Gold medal – first place	1975 East York
Silver medal – second place	1976 Aviemore
World Senior Championships
Bronze medal – third place	2006 Copenhagen

Jan Åke Ullsten (born 29 November 1954) is a Swedish curler.

He is a 1974 World championship silver medallist and a two-time Swedish men's curling champion (1974, 1981).

In 1980 he was inducted into the Swedish Curling Hall of Fame.

== Teams ==
Season	Skip	Third	Second	Lead	Alternate	Events
1973–74	Jan Ullsten	Tom Berggren	Anders Grahn	Roger Bredin		SMCC 1974 (gold); WCC 1974 (silver)
1974–75	Jan Ullsten	Mats Nyberg	Anders Grahn	Bo Söderström		SJCC 1975 (gold); WJCC 1975 (gold)
1975–76	Jan Ullsten	Mats Nyberg	Anders Grahn	Bo Söderström		SJCC 1976 (gold); WJCC 1976 (silver)
1979–80	Jan Ullsten	Anders Thidholm	Anders Nilsson	Hans Söderström	Bertil Timan	ECC 1979 (silver)
1980–81	Jan Ullsten	Anders Thidholm	Anders Nilsson	Hans Söderström		SMCC 1981 (gold); WCC 1981 (5th)
2005–06	Jan Ullsten	Björn Rudström	Lars Strandqvist	Lars Engblom		WSCC 2006 (bronze)
