= Massimo Alverà =

Italian male curler

- Curler ♂
- Born: 6 August 1957 (age 69); Cortina d'Ampezzo, Italy

Team
- Curling club: CC Cortina, Cortina d'Ampezzo, CC Dolomiti, Cortina d'Ampezzo

Curling career
- Member Association: Italy
- World Championship: 1 (1983)
- European Championship: 1 (1981)
- Other appearances: World Junior Championships: 5 (1975, 1976, 1977, 1978, 1979)
Medal record
Curling

Massimo Alverà (born 6 August 1957 in Cortina d'Ampezzo, Italy) is an Italian curler.

== Teams ==
| Season | Skip | Third | Second | Lead | Events |
|---|---|---|---|---|---|
| 1975–76 | Massimo Alverà | Franco Sovilla | Fabio Bovolenta | Marco Lorenzi | WJCC 1976 (10th) |
| 1976–77 | Massimo Alverà | Franco Sovilla | Fabio Bovolenta | Stefano Morona | WJCC 1977 (8th) |
| 1977–78 | Massimo Alverà | Franco Sovilla | Stefano Morona | Dennis Ghezze | WJCC 1978 (10th) |
| 1978–79 | Massimo Alverà | Franco Sovilla | Stefano Morona | Dennis Ghezze | WJCC 1979 (8th) |
| 1981–82 | Giuseppe Dal Molin | Massimo Alverà | Franco Sovilla | Claudio Alverà | ECC 1981 (8th) |
| 1982–83 | Massimo Alverà (fourth) | Franco Sovilla | Giuseppe Dal Molin (skip) | Stefano Morona | WCC 1983 (10th) |
