= Katarina Hultling =

Swedish journalist

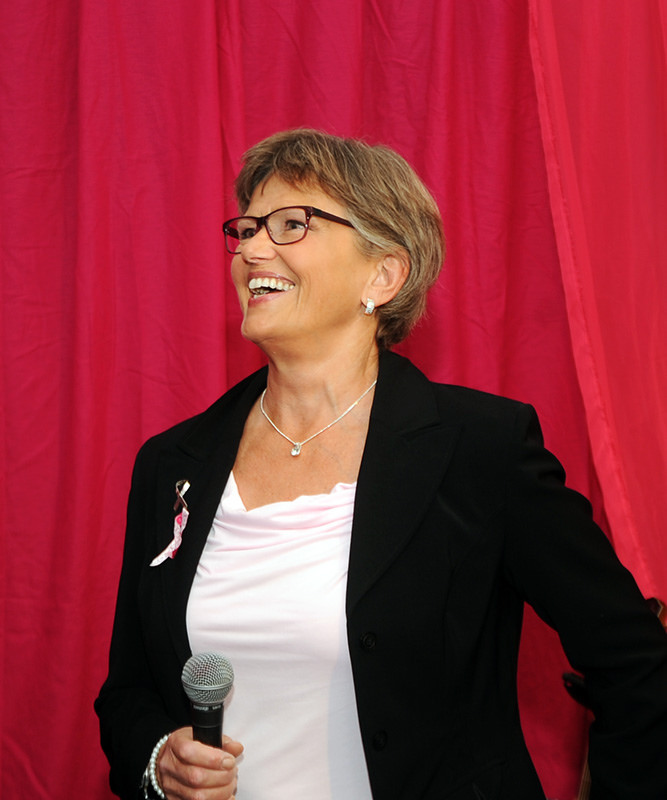
- Hultling in September 2015
- Born: Katarina Eva Maria Hultling; 5 December 1954 (age 71); Stockholm
- Other name: Katarina Eva Maria Hultling Sjöberg
- Occupations: Journalist, Television presenter, Curler
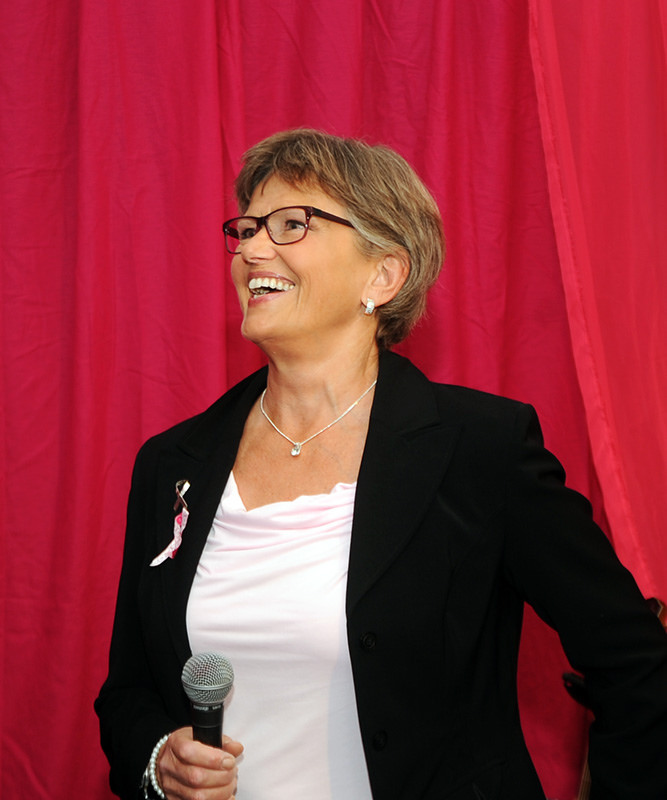

Curling career

Team
- Curling club: Amatörföreningens CK, Stockholm, Karlstads CK, Karlstad

Curling career
- Member Association: Sweden
- World Championship: 2 (1979, 1982)
- European Championship: 4 (1979, 1981, 1982, 1983)
Medal record
Curling
Representing Sweden
World Championships
Silver medal – second place	1979 Perth
Silver medal – second place	1982 Geneva
European Championships
Gold medal – first place	1982 Kirkcaldy
Gold medal – first place	1983 Västerås
Silver medal – second place	1979 Varese
Silver medal – second place	1981 Grindelwald
Swedish Women's Championship
Gold medal – first place	1979
Gold medal – first place	1982

Eva Maria Katarina Hultling (born 5 December 1954), in marriage known as Hultling Sjöberg, is a Swedish sports journalist, television presenter and former curler.

== Biography ==
Hultling was born in Stockholm to actor Arthur Hultling and grew up in Stockholm and Västerås. After attending Adolf Fredrik's Music School and Adolf Fredrik's music high school, she began as an exchange telephonist at Hotel Reisen in Stockholm. She wanted to become an actress and applied for the Stage School, but did not enter. Instead, she was accepted to the School of Journalism and then began as a reporter on Radio Värmland.

Hultling has a great sporting interest and has played curling at the elite level for many years. In 1982 and 1983 she was a member of Team Högström. In 1992 she ran the New York Marathon.

In 1999, she released a record with her own children's songs, Victors visor.

== Journalism career ==
Later Hultling started her work on national radio and read news telegrams. After reporting from the 1985 World Championships, she started at the Radiosporten at SR. She went on to the SVT's Sports News in 1985. During the second half of 1987, she became the program manager for TV's news magazine 20:00. From 1989 to 1992 she did the annual program "The Year with the Royal Family" (Året med kungafamiljen) and also reported from the Nobel Dinner. In 1993 she returned to the sports editorial department and has done programs such as Sportnytt, Sportspegeln and Lilla Sportspegeln.

On 23 December 2007 she made her final broadcast in the Sportspegeln, following over 1,600 programs. She has since switched to TV4 as a curling and figure skating commentator.

== Personal life ==
In June 1987, Hultling married radio reporter Claes Sjöberg. They adopted a son in 1990. In the mid-1990s, she met her current partner Albert Svanberg.

Hultling has publicly stated that she has breast cancer. In SVT's talk program Skavlan in March 2012, she told about the disease and exposed her bare head.

== Curling career ==
She is a two-time World silver medallist, a two-time European champion, Swedish women's and mixed champion.

In 1982, she was inducted into the Swedish Curling Hall of Fame.

=== Teams ===
==== Women's ====
Season	Skip	Third	Second	Lead	Events
1978–79	Birgitta Törn	Katarina Hultling	Susanne Gynning-Ödling	Gunilla Bergman	WCC 1979 (silver)
1979–80	Birgitta Törn	Katarina Hultling	Susanne Gynning-Ödling	Gunilla Bergman	ECC 1979 (silver)
1981–82	Elisabeth Högström	Katarina Hultling	Birgitta Sewik	Karin Sjögren	ECC 1981 (silver); SWCC 1982 (gold); WCC 1982 (silver)
1982–83	Elisabeth Högström	Katarina Hultling	Birgitta Sewik	Karin Sjögren	ECC 1982 (gold)
1983–84	Elisabeth Högström	Katarina Hultling	Birgitta Sewik	Karin Sjögren	ECC 1983 (gold)

==== Mixed ====
Season	Skip	Third	Second	Lead	Events
1982	Pelle Lindeman	Katarina Hultling	Håkan Ståhlbro	Birgitta Sewik	SMxCC 1982 (gold)
