= Barbro Arfwidsson =

Swedish female curler

- Curler ♀
- Born: 20 September 1932 (age 94)

Team
- Curling club: Norrköpings CK, Norrköping

Curling career
- Member Association: Sweden
- World Championship: 3 (1985, 1986)
- European Championship: 2 (1978, 1985)
Medal record
Curling
World Championships
Bronze medal – third place	1986 Kelowna
European Championships
Gold medal – first place	1978 Aviemore
Swedish Women's Championship
Gold medal – first place	1978
Gold medal – first place	1985

Barbro Arfwidsson (born 20 September 1932) is a Swedish female curler.

She is a 1986 World championship bronze medallist and a 1978 European champion.

In 1978 she was inducted into the Swedish Curling Hall of Fame.

== Personal life ==
She was married to Swedish curler Rolf Arfwidsson, a 1962 World Men's Championship participant and 1962 Swedish men's champion curler. Her younger sister Inga was her teammate and skip.

== Teams ==
Season	Skip	Third	Second	Lead	Events
1977–78	Inga Arfwidsson	Barbro Arfwidsson	Ingrid Appelquist	Gunvor Björhäll	SWCC 1978 (gold)
1978–79	Inga Arfwidsson	Barbro Arfwidsson	Ingrid Appelquist	Gunvor Björhäll	ECC 1978 (gold)
1984–85	Maud Nordlander (fourth)	Inga Arfwidsson (skip)	Ulrika Åkerberg	Barbro Arfwidsson	SWCC 1985 (gold); WCC 1985 (4th)
1985–86	Maud Nordlander (fourth)	Inga Arfwidsson (skip)	Ulrika Åkerberg	Barbro Arfwidsson	ECC 1985 (5th); WCC 1986 (bronze)
