= Inga Arfwidsson =

Swedish female curler

- Curler ♀
- Born: 26 April 1940 (age 86)

Team
- Curling club: Norrköpings CK, Norrköping

Curling career
- Member Association: Sweden
- World Championship: 3 (1985, 1986, 1987)
- European Championship: 2 (1978, 1985)
Medal record
Curling
World championships
| Bronze medal – third place | 1986 Kelowna |
European Championships
| Gold medal – first place | 1978 Aviemore |
Swedish Women's Championship
| Gold medal – first place | 1978 |
| Gold medal – first place | 1985 |

Inga Arfwidsson (born 26 April 1940) is a Swedish female curler.

She is a 1986 World championship bronze medallist and a 1978 European champion.

She was a board member of the Swedish Curling Association (SCA) from 1980 to 1988, and was SCA chairperson from 1990 to 1991.

She is also an international curling judge.

In 1979 she was inducted into the Swedish Curling Hall of Fame.

== Personal life ==
Her older sister Barbro was her teammate.

== Teams ==
| Season | Skip | Third | Second | Lead | Alternate | Events |
|---|---|---|---|---|---|---|
| 1977–78 | Inga Arfwidsson | Barbro Arfwidsson | Ingrid Appelquist | Gunvor Björhäll | | SWCC 1978 (gold) |
| 1978–79 | Inga Arfwidsson | Barbro Arfwidsson | Ingrid Appelquist | Gunvor Björhäll | | ECC 1978 (gold) |
| 1984–85 | Maud Nordlander (fourth) | Inga Arfwidsson (skip) | Ulrika Åkerberg | Barbro Arfwidsson | | SWCC 1985 (gold); WCC 1985 (4th) |
| 1985–86 | Maud Nordlander (fourth) | Inga Arfwidsson (skip) | Ulrika Åkerberg | Barbro Arfwidsson | | ECC 1985 (5th); WCC 1986 (bronze) |
| 1987 | Elisabeth Högström | Birgitta Sewik | Eva Andersson | Bitte Berg | Inga Arfwidsson | WCC 1987 (6th) |
