= Willie Frame =

Scottish footballer

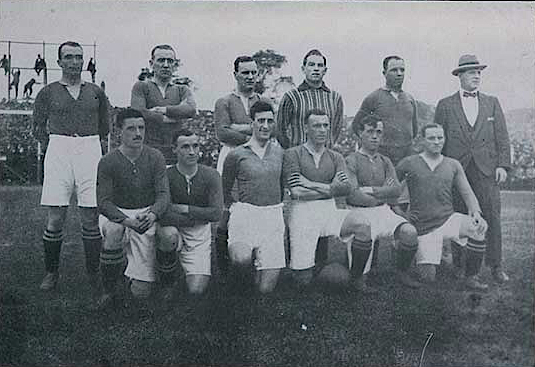
- Third Lanark team during 1923 tour – Frame standing, far left

Personal information
- Full name: William Frame
- Date of birth: c. 1896
- Place of birth: Larkhall, Scotland
- Height: 5 ft 8 in (1.73 m)
- Position: Left back

Senior career*
Years	Team	Apps	(Gls)
–	Larkhall Thistle		
1918–1924	Clyde	194	(0)
1924–1930	Motherwell	173	(0)
1930–1931	Dunfermline Athletic	35	(0)
Total		402	(0)
- * Club domestic league appearances and goals

William Frame was a Scottish footballer who played as a left back, although he could also play at left half. He spent six years with Clyde and six with Motherwell (being heavily involved during a period in the late 1920s where the "Steelmen" consistently finished near the top of the Scottish Football League table, being runners-up in the 1926–27 and 1929–30 seasons). Serving as captain at some points, he was also reported as being on the verge of leaving the club when left out of the team, and eventually fell out of favour at Fir Park and moved to second-tier Dunfermline Athletic. He did not score any goals in over 430 appearances in Scotland's leagues or the Scottish Cup.

During his time at Clyde, Frame played in the Glasgow FA's annual challenge match against Sheffield in four consecutive years, and he was a guest member of a squad organised by Third Lanark that toured South America in the summer of 1923, also visiting that region with Motherwell in 1928.

After retiring, he unsuccessfully applied to be manager of Ayr United and Raith Rovers and later joined the AEI works at Motherwell, where his sons already worked; 1960s player John Moore credited Frame with providing good advice on becoming a professional having seen him play in casual workplace games. Frame was also a groundskeeper at a local park.

Frame's career has been merged in some sources with that of a younger player of the same name, a goalkeeper who was a reserve with Motherwell at the same time as the defender left the club, then played in England's Football League for one year with Gateshead in 1931–32, followed by two seasons at Bray Unknowns in the Republic of Ireland and four seasons with Linfield in Northern Ireland, returning to Motherwell for a short spell in 1938.
