= Giuseppe Dal Molin =

Italian curler

- Curler ♂

Team
- Curling club: CC Cortina, Cortina d'Ampezzo, CC Tofane, Cortina d'Ampezzo

Curling career
- Member Association: Italy
- World Championship: 7 (1975, 1976, 1977, 1979, 1980, 1981, 1983)
- European Championship: 5 (1976, 1977, 1978, 1979, 1981)
Medal record
Curling
European Championships
Bronze medal – third place	1979 Varese

Giuseppe Dal Molin (born c. 1928) is an Italian curler.

At the international level, he is a 1979 European bronze medallist.

== Teams ==
Season	Skip	Third	Second	Lead	Events
1974–75	Giuseppe Dal Molin	Leone Rezzadore	Franco Caldara	Enea Pavani	WCC 1975 (10th)
1975–76	Giuseppe Dal Molin	Andrea Pavani	Enea Pavani	Leone Rezzadore	WCC 1976 (5th)
1976–77	Giuseppe Dal Molin	Andrea Pavani	Enea Pavani	Giorgio Vani	ECC 1976 (8th)
1976–77	Giuseppe Dal Molin	Andrea Pavani	Giancarlo Valt	Enea Pavani	WCC 1977 (7th)
1977–78	Giuseppe Dal Molin	Giancarlo Valt	Enea Pavani	Ivo Lorenzi	ECC 1977 (4th)
1978–79	Giuseppe Dal Molin	Enea Pavani	Giancarlo Valt	Andrea Pavani	ECC 1978 (6th)
1978–79	Giuseppe Dal Molin	Andrea Pavani	Giancarlo Valt	Enea Pavani	WCC 1979 (8th)
1979–80	Giuseppe Dal Molin	Andrea Pavani	Giancarlo Valt	Enea Pavani	ECC 1979 (bronze)
1979–80	Andrea Pavani (fourth)	Giuseppe Dal Molin (skip)	Giancarlo Valt	Enea Pavani	WCC 1980 (7th)
1980–81	Andrea Pavani (fourth)	Giuseppe Dal Molin (skip)	Giancarlo Valt	Enea Pavani	WCC 1981 (7th)
1981–82	Giuseppe Dal Molin	Massimo Alverà	Franco Sovilla	Claudio Alverà	ECC 1981 (8th)
1982–83	Massimo Alverà (fourth)	Franco Sovilla	Giuseppe Dal Molin (skip)	Stefano Morona	WCC 1983 (10th)
