= Jürg Tanner =

Swiss curler

Medal record

Representing Switzerland

Men's Curling

World Championships
Gold medal – first place	1981 London	Team
Silver medal – second place	1982 Garmisch-Partenkirchen	Team
Bronze medal – third place	1980 Moncton	Team

Jürg Tanner (born 7 August 1953) is a Swiss curler and former World Champion. He won a gold medal at the 1981 Air Canada Silver Broom, the men's world curling championship. He also won a silver and a bronze medal at the 1982 and 1980 Air Canada Silver Brooms, respectively, with teammates Jürg Hornisberger, Patrik Lörtscher, and Franz Tanner.
