= Linda Thommen =

Swiss curler

Medal record

Representing Switzerland

Women's Curling

World championships
Gold medal – first place	1979 Perth	Team

Linda Thommen is a Swiss curler and World Champion. She won a gold medal at the 1979 World Curling Championships.
