= Trine Trulsen Vågberg =

Norwegian curler (born 1962)

Medal record

Representing Norway

Women's Curling

World Championships
Silver medal – second place	1989 Milwaukee	Team
Bronze medal – third place	2002 Bismarck	Team

European Championships
Silver medal – second place	1980 Copenhagen	
Silver medal – second place	1983 Väterås	
Silver medal – second place	1991 Chamonix	
Bronze medal – third place	1985 Grindelwald	
Bronze medal – third place	1987 Oberstdorf	
Bronze medal – third place	1992 Perth	

Trine Trulsen Vågberg (born 19 April 1962 in Drøbak, Norway) is a Norwegian curler. She won a silver medal at the 1989, and a bronze medal at the 2002 World Curling Championships.

Trulsen Vågberg is the twin sister of Pål Trulsen, Olympic curling champion at the 2002 Winter Olympics, and is married to her brother's team member Lars Vågberg from the same Olympic Games.
