= 2012 World Senior Curling Championships – Men's tournament =

2012 World Senior Curling Championships Men's tournament
- Host city: Tårnby, Denmark
- Arena: Tårnby Curling Club
- Dates: April 14–21
- Winner: Ireland
- Skip: John Jo Kenny
- Third: Bill Gray
- Second: David Whyte
- Lead: Tony Tierney
- Alternate: David Hume
- Finalist: Canada (Kelly Robertson)

The men's tournament of the 2012 World Senior Curling Championships was held from April 14 to 21.

== Teams ==
The teams are listed as follows:

=== White Group ===
Canada	Hungary	Italy	Japan
Skip: Kelly Robertson Third: Doug Armour; Second: Peter Prokopowich; Lead: Robert Scales	Skip: Andras Rókusfalvy Third: Mihály Verasztó; Second: László Tolnai; Lead: György Kalmár	Skip: Antonio Menardi Third: Fabio Alvera; Second: Giorgio Alberti; Lead: Stefano Morona; Alternate: Franco Sovilla	Skip: Yutaka Matsuura Third: Ryoichi Saito; Second: Kikuo Kobayashi; Lead: Toshiyuki Numata; Alternate: Toshiharu Kamiya
Netherlands	New Zealand	Scotland	
Skip: Wim Neeleman Third: Frank Kerkvliet; Second: Jos Wilmot; Lead: Bas Bennis	Skip: Hans Frauenlob Third: Lorne DePape; Second: Al Langille; Lead: Pat Cooney	Skip: Keith Prentice Third: Lockhart Steele; Second: Robin Aitken; Lead: Tommy Fleming; Alternate: Archie Craig	

=== Red Group ===
England	Finland	Ireland	Latvia
Skip: Michael Sutherland Third: Tommy Campbell; Second: John Summers; Lead: Phil Barton; Alternate: John Brown	Skip: Timo Kauste Third: Yrjö Franssila; Second: Jorma Venâlâinen; Lead: Seppo Malinen	Skip: John Jo Kenny Third: Bill Gray; Second: David Whyte; Lead: Tony Tierney; Alternate: David Hume	Skip: Peteris Sviesbergs Third: Aivargs Purmalis; Second: Janis Redlihs; Lead: Ivars Cernajs; Alternate: Girts Sils
Russia	Slovakia	Switzerland	United States
Skip: Sergey Korolenko Third: Mikhail Rivkind; Second: Sergey Narudinov; Lead: Oleg Badilin	Skip: Milan Kalis Third: Karol Pospichal; Second: Ondrej Marček; Lead: Pavol Trstan; Alternate: Boris Kutka	Skip: Karl Grossmann Third: Hanspeter Nauer; Second: Hansruedi Maag; Lead: Heinz Meierhofer	Skip: Ian Journeaux Third: Dave Carlson; Second: Tim Funk; Lead: Ken Spatola; Alternate: Mark Swandby

=== Blue Group ===
Australia	Austria	Czech Republic	Denmark
Skip: Hugh Millikin Third: John Theriault; Second: Steve Hewitt; Lead: Rob Gagnon; Alternate: Wyatt Buck	Fourth: Herbert Planer Third: Josef Leputsch; Second: Herbert Rabacher; Skip: Ronald Niederhauser; Alternate: Johann Raidl	Skip: Petr Kovač Third: Jaroslav Havel; Second: Petr Fiřt; Lead: Vladimír Foltýn	Skip: Hans Peter Schack Third: Bernd Hausted; Second: John Hansen; Lead: Erling Berg Thomsen; Alternate: Alex Tordrup
Germany	Norway	Sweden	Wales
Skip: Rainer Schöpp Third: Christoph Falk; Second: Uli Sutor; Lead: Karl Stiller; Alternate: Adolf Geiselhart	Skip: Eigil Ramsfjell Third: Sjur Loen; Second: Morten Søgård; Lead: Dagfinn Loen; Alternate: Stein Mellemseter	Skip: Connie Östlund Third: Morgan Fredholm; Second: Lars Lindgren; Lead: Glenn Franzén; Alternate: Stig Sewik	Skip: Chris Wells Third: Hugh Meikle; Second: Stewart Cairns; Lead: Andrew Carr; Alternate: Peter Sims

== Round-robin standings ==
Final round-robin standings

Key
Teams to Playoffs
Teams to Draw Shot Challenge (team with best moves to playoffs, other two play in qualification game)
Teams to Tiebreaker (winner moves on to Draw Shot Challenge)

White Group	Skip	W	L
Canada	Kelly Robertson	6	0
New Zealand	Hans Frauenlob	4	2
Italy	Antonio Menardi	3	3
Scotland	Keith Prentice	3	3
Japan	Yutak Matsuura	3	3
Netherlands	Wim Neeleman	2	4
Hungary	Andras Rókusfalvy	0	6

Red Group	Skip	W	L
Ireland	John Jo Kenny	7	0
Finland	Timo Kauste	6	1
Switzerland	Karl Grossmann	4	3
England	Michael Sutherland	3	4
Latvia	Peteris Sveisbergs	3	4
United States	Ian Journeaux	3	4
Russia	Sergey Korolenko	1	6
Slovakia	Milan Kalis	0	7

Blue Group	Skip	W	L
Norway	Eigil Ramsfjell	6	1
Sweden	Connie Östlund	6	1
Australia	Hugh Millikin	6	1
Germany	Rainer Schöpp	4	3
Czech Republic	Petr Kovač	2	5
Austria	Ronald Niederhauser	2	5
Denmark	Hans Peter Schack	1	6
Wales	Chris Wells	1	6

== Round-robin results ==
All times listed in Central Europe Time (UTC+1).

=== White Group ===
==== Sunday, April 15 ====
Draw 1 9:00

Sheet A	1	2	3	4	5	6	7	8	Final
Canada (Robertson)	1	1	1	0	4	0	2	X	9
Hungary (Rókusfalvy)	0	0	0	1	0	1	0	X	2

Sheet B	1	2	3	4	5	6	7	8	Final
Italy (Menardi)	0	2	1	0	0	1	0	1	5
Japan (Matsuura)	1	0	0	0	0	0	2	0	3

Sheet D	1	2	3	4	5	6	7	8	Final
Netherlands (Neeleman)	1	0	1	0	1	0	1	0	4
New Zealand (Frauenlob)	0	1	0	2	0	1	0	2	6

Draw 3 16:00

Sheet C	1	2	3	4	5	6	7	8	Final
Canada (Robertson)	3	0	0	0	1	1	2	X	7
Italy (Menardi)	0	2	0	0	0	0	0	X	2

Sheet D	1	2	3	4	5	6	7	8	Final
Hungary (Rókusfalvy)	0	0	0	1	0	0	1	X	2
Japan (Matsuura)	1	1	1	0	1	2	0	X	6

Sheet F	1	2	3	4	5	6	7	8	Final
New Zealand (Frauenlob)	0	0	1	0	2	1	2	X	6
Scotland (Prentice)	0	1	0	1	0	0	0	X	2

==== Monday, April 16 ====
Draw 8 19:30

Sheet A	1	2	3	4	5	6	7	8	Final
Netherlands (Neeleman)	1	0	1	0	0	0	0	X	2
Japan (Matsuura)	0	1	0	3	0	3	1	X	8

Sheet B	1	2	3	4	5	6	7	8	Final
Canada (Robertson)	1	0	4	0	2	0	2	X	9
Scotland (Prentice)	0	1	0	2	0	1	0	X	4

Sheet E	1	2	3	4	5	6	7	8	Final
Hungary (Rókusfalvy)	0	1	1	0	2	0	0	0	4
New Zealand (Frauenlob)	2	0	0	2	0	1	1	1	7

==== Tuesday, April 17 ====
Draw 10 12:30

Sheet A	1	2	3	4	5	6	7	8	Final
Italy (Menardi)	0	0	2	0	0	0	0	X	2
New Zealand (Frauenlob)	0	1	0	2	1	1	1	X	6

Sheet C	1	2	3	4	5	6	7	8	Final
Netherlands (Neeleman)	0	1	0	1	0	0	X	X	2
Canada (Robertson)	4	0	4	0	3	1	X	X	12

Sheet E	1	2	3	4	5	6	7	8	Final
Scotland (Prentice)	1	0	0	3	0	0	3	X	7
Japan (Matsuura)	0	1	1	0	1	1	0	X	4

==== Wednesday, April 18 ====
Draw 13 9:00

Sheet B	1	2	3	4	5	6	7	8	Final
Netherlands (Neeleman)	0	1	2	1	0	0	2	X	6
Hungary (Rókusfalvy)	1	0	0	0	0	2	0	X	3

Sheet C	1	2	3	4	5	6	7	8	Final
Japan (Matsuura)	1	0	0	2	0	2	2	X	7
New Zealand (Frauenlob)	0	2	0	0	1	0	0	X	3

Sheet D	1	2	3	4	5	6	7	8	Final
Italy (Menardi)	0	1	0	2	0	0	1	2	6
Scotland (Prentice)	1	0	3	0	0	1	0	0	5

Draw 15 16:00

Sheet A	1	2	3	4	5	6	7	8	Final
Scotland (Prentice)	0	0	2	0	2	0	2	X	6
Netherlands (Neeleman)	0	1	0	1	0	1	0	X	3

Sheet F	1	2	3	4	5	6	7	8	Final
Japan (Matsuura)	1	0	0	1	0	0	1	X	3
Canada (Robertson)	0	0	0	0	5	1	0	X	6

Sheet G	1	2	3	4	5	6	7	8	9	Final
Hungary (Rókusfalvy)	0	0	1	0	1	1	0	0	0	3
Italy (Menardi)	1	0	0	2	0	0	0	0	2	5

==== Thursday, April 19 ====
Draw 20 19:30

Sheet C	1	2	3	4	5	6	7	8	Final
Scotland (Prentice)	2	0	1	0	0	0	1	2	6
Hungary (Rókusfalvy)	0	1	0	0	1	1	0	0	3

Sheet D	1	2	3	4	5	6	7	8	Final
New Zealand (Frauenlob)	0	1	0	2	0	2	0	X	5
Canada (Robertson)	2	0	3	0	2	0	4	X	11

Sheet E	1	2	3	4	5	6	7	8	Final
Italy (Menardi)	0	0	0	2	0	2	X	X	4
Netherlands (Neeleman)	2	2	1	0	4	0	X	X	9

=== Red Group ===
==== Sunday, April 15 ====
Draw 2 12:30

Sheet A	1	2	3	4	5	6	7	8	Final
Latvia (Sveisbergs)	1	0	1	0	0	0	1	X	3
Switzerland (Grossmann)	0	1	0	1	3	3	0	X	8

Sheet C	1	2	3	4	5	6	7	8	Final
United States (Journeaux)	1	0	0	0	1	0	0	X	2
Finland (Kauste)	0	0	0	3	0	1	1	X	5

Sheet D	1	2	3	4	5	6	7	8	Final
Slovakia (Kalis)	0	1	0	1	0	0	1	X	3
England (Sutherland)	1	0	3	0	0	2	0	X	6

Sheet E	1	2	3	4	5	6	7	8	Final
Ireland (Kenny)	0	1	1	3	0	0	0	2	7
Russia (Korolenko)	1	0	0	0	3	1	0	0	5

==== Monday, April 16 ====
Draw 5 9:00

Sheet B	1	2	3	4	5	6	7	8	Final
Russia (Korolenko)	1	0	0	1	0	0	3	0	5
Finland (Kauste)	0	1	0	0	1	2	0	2	6

Sheet C	1	2	3	4	5	6	7	8	Final
Latvia (Sveisbergs)	2	0	0	2	0	0	3	X	7
Slovakia (Kalis)	0	1	1	0	1	1	0	X	4

Sheet D	1	2	3	4	5	6	7	8	Final
Ireland (Kenny)	2	0	1	0	2	0	2	X	7
United States (Journeaux)	0	1	0	1	0	1	0	X	3

Sheet E	1	2	3	4	5	6	7	8	Final
England (Sutherland)	0	1	0	1	0	0	1	X	3
Switzerland (Grossmann)	1	0	1	0	2	1	0	X	5

Draw 7 16:00

Sheet C	1	2	3	4	5	6	7	8	Final
England (Sutherland)	2	1	0	0	2	0	1	X	6
Ireland (Kenny)	0	0	4	1	0	3	0	X	8

Sheet D	1	2	3	4	5	6	7	8	Final
Finland (Kauste)	1	1	1	0	1	0	4	X	8
Latvia (Sveisbergs)	0	0	0	1	0	1	0	X	2

Sheet F	1	2	3	4	5	6	7	8	Final
Slovakia (Kalis)	1	0	0	0	1	0	0	X	2
United States (Journeaux)	0	2	1	1	0	4	0	X	8

Sheet G	1	2	3	4	5	6	7	8	Final
Switzerland (Grossmann)	2	0	0	0	0	1	2	X	5
Russia (Korolenko)	0	0	2	0	0	0	0	X	2

==== Tuesday, April 17 ====
Draw 12 19:30

Sheet A	1	2	3	4	5	6	7	8	Final
Russia (Korolenko)	0	0	0	1	0	1	0	X	2
Latvia (Sveisbergs)	0	2	0	0	2	0	3	X	7

Sheet B	1	2	3	4	5	6	7	8	Final
England (Sutherland)	2	1	0	1	0	2	1	X	7
United States (Journeaux)	0	0	2	0	0	0	0	X	2

Sheet E	1	2	3	4	5	6	7	8	Final
Finland (Kauste)	2	1	0	4	0	2	0	X	9
Slovakia (Kalis)	0	0	1	0	1	0	2	X	4

Sheet F	1	2	3	4	5	6	7	8	9	Final
Switzerland (Grossmann)	0	0	0	1	0	1	0	1	0	3
Ireland (Kenny)	0	0	1	0	2	0	0	0	2	5

==== Wednesday, April 18 ====
Draw 14 12:30

Sheet A	1	2	3	4	5	6	7	8	Final
Ireland (Kenny)	1	0	0	4	2	1	0	X	8
Slovakia (Kalis)	0	1	1	0	0	0	1	X	3

Sheet C	1	2	3	4	5	6	7	8	Final
Russia (Korolenko)	0	1	0	0	1	0	1	0	3
England (Sutherland)	1	0	3	2	0	1	0	3	10

Sheet D	1	2	3	4	5	6	7	8	9	10	Final
Switzerland (Grossmann)	0	0	1	0	1	0	0	0	0	0	2
Finland (Kauste)	0	1	0	1	0	0	0	0	0	1	3

Draw 15 16:00

Sheet E	1	2	3	4	5	6	7	8	Final
United States (Journeaux)	5	0	4	0	0	1	X	X	10
Latvia (Sveisbergs)	0	1	0	1	1	0	X	X	3

==== Thursday, April 19 ====
Draw 17 9:00

Sheet A	1	2	3	4	5	6	7	8	Final
England (Sutherland)	1	0	0	1	1	1	0	X	4
Finland (Kauste)	0	0	5	0	0	0	2	X	7

Sheet B	1	2	3	4	5	6	7	8	9	Final
Ireland (Kenny)	1	0	1	0	1	0	2	0	1	6
Latvia (Sveisbergs)	0	1	0	1	0	1	0	2	0	5

Sheet C	1	2	3	4	5	6	7	8	Final
Switzerland (Grossmann)	1	1	0	2	0	1	0	1	6
United States (Journeaux)	0	0	1	0	1	0	2	0	4

Sheet D	1	2	3	4	5	6	7	8	Final
Russia (Korolenko)	2	1	0	1	0	3	0	X	7
Slovakia (Kalis)	0	0	1	0	1	0	1	X	3

Draw 19 16:00

Sheet A	1	2	3	4	5	6	7	8	Final
United States (Journeaux)	2	2	0	0	5	0	X	X	9
Russia (Korolenko)	0	0	1	1	0	1	X	X	3

Sheet B	1	2	3	4	5	6	7	8	Final
Slovakia (Kalis)	0	0	1	0	1	0	1	X	3
Switzerland (Grossmann)	3	1	0	1	0	3	0	X	8

Sheet F	1	2	3	4	5	6	7	8	Final
Latvia (Sveisbergs)	2	1	0	1	0	1	0	1	6
England (Sutherland)	0	0	1	0	2	0	1	0	4

Sheet G	1	2	3	4	5	6	7	8	9	Final
Finland (Kauste)	0	0	0	1	1	1	0	1	0	4
Ireland (Kenny)	1	0	1	0	0	0	2	0	1	5

=== Blue Group ===
==== Sunday, April 15 ====
Draw 4 19:30

Sheet A	1	2	3	4	5	6	7	8	Final
Czech Republic (Kovač)	0	0	1	0	2	1	0	0	4
Norway (Ramsfjell)	1	0	0	1	0	0	2	3	7

Sheet C	1	2	3	4	5	6	7	8	Final
Germany (Schöpp)	0	1	2	0	0	0	0	X	3
Australia (Millikin)	2	0	0	1	0	3	2	X	8

Sheet D	1	2	3	4	5	6	7	8	Final
Sweden (Östlund)	2	3	2	0	2	1	0	X	10
Austria (Niederhauser)	0	0	0	1	0	0	1	X	2

Sheet E	1	2	3	4	5	6	7	8	Final
Wales (Wells)	0	2	0	4	0	3	0	X	9
Denmark (Schack)	2	0	2	0	0	0	1	X	5

==== Monday, April 16 ====
Draw 6 12:30

Sheet A	1	2	3	4	5	6	7	8	Final
Germany (Schöpp)	0	4	0	1	1	1	0	X	7
Denmark (Schack)	0	0	3	0	0	0	2	X	5

Sheet B	1	2	3	4	5	6	7	8	Final
Australia (Millikin)	0	0	0	3	0	3	1	X	7
Wales (Wells)	0	0	1	0	1	0	0	X	2

Sheet E	1	2	3	4	5	6	7	8	Final
Austria (Niederhauser)	0	0	0	0	0	1	X	X	1
Norway (Ramsfjell)	3	3	3	2	1	0	X	X	12

Sheet F	1	2	3	4	5	6	7	8	Final
Sweden (Östlund)	3	0	0	0	4	2	X	X	9
Czech Republic (Kovač)	0	1	0	0	0	0	X	X	1

==== Tuesday, April 17 ====
Draw 9 9:00

Sheet A	1	2	3	4	5	6	7	8	Final
Australia (Millikin)	0	2	2	0	2	2	0	X	8
Austria (Niederhauser)	1	0	0	2	0	0	1	X	4

Sheet B	1	2	3	4	5	6	7	8	Final
Czech Republic (Kovač)	1	0	0	1	0	4	0	X	6
Denmark (Schack)	0	0	1	0	2	0	1	X	4

Sheet C	1	2	3	4	5	6	7	8	Final
Sweden (Östlund)	0	0	2	3	0	3	0	X	8
Wales (Wells)	0	2	0	0	1	0	1	X	4

Sheet D	1	2	3	4	5	6	7	8	9	Final
Germany (Schöpp)	1	1	0	0	0	1	0	2	0	5
Norway (Ramsfjell)	0	0	1	1	1	0	2	0	1	6

Draw 11 16:00

Sheet C	1	2	3	4	5	6	7	8	Final
Australia (Millikin)	0	0	2	0	5	0	2	X	9
Czech Republic (Kovač)	0	0	0	2	0	2	0	X	4

Sheet D	1	2	3	4	5	6	7	8	Final
Austria (Niederhauser)	3	0	1	0	1	0	1	0	6
Denmark (Schack)	0	2	0	4	0	1	0	1	8

Sheet F	1	2	3	4	5	6	7	8	Final
Norway (Ramsfjell)	1	1	2	0	1	0	1	X	6
Wales (Wells)	0	0	0	1	0	1	0	X	2

Sheet G	1	2	3	4	5	6	7	8	Final
Sweden (Östlund)	0	2	1	0	2	0	X	X	5
Germany (Schöpp)	0	0	0	2	0	2	X	X	4

==== Wednesday, April 18 ====
Draw 13 9:00

Sheet A	1	2	3	4	5	6	7	8	Final
Wales (Wells)	0	1	0	1	0	2	X	X	4
Germany (Schöpp)	3	0	5	0	2	0	X	X	10

Draw 14 12:30

Sheet B	1	2	3	4	5	6	7	8	9	Final
Norway (Ramsfjell)	0	1	0	1	0	0	0	1	0	3
Sweden (Östlund)	0	0	1	0	1	1	0	0	3	6

Sheet F	1	2	3	4	5	6	7	8	Final
Denmark (Schack)	3	0	0	2	1	1	0	0	7
Australia (Millikin)	0	2	4	0	0	0	3	2	11

Sheet G	1	2	3	4	5	6	7	8	9	Final
Austria (Niederhauser)	0	2	0	1	1	1	1	0	3	9
Czech Republic (Kovač)	3	0	2	0	0	0	0	1	0	6

Draw 16 19:30

Sheet B	1	2	3	4	5	6	7	8	Final
Germany (Schöpp)	3	0	2	0	0	1	2	X	8
Austria (Niederhauser)	0	2	0	1	1	0	0	X	4

Sheet C	1	2	3	4	5	6	7	8	Final
Denmark (Schack)	0	1	0	1	0	1	0	X	3
Norway (Ramsfjell)	4	0	2	0	2	0	2	X	10

Sheet D	1	2	3	4	5	6	7	8	Final
Czech Republic (Kovač)	0	1	1	1	1	0	1	0	5
Wales (Wells)	1	0	0	0	0	2	0	1	4

Sheet E	1	2	3	4	5	6	7	8	Final
Australia (Millikin)	0	0	2	0	1	3	0	1	7
Sweden (Östlund)	1	1	0	0	0	0	2	0	4

==== Thursday, April 19 ====
Draw 18 12:30

Sheet A	1	2	3	4	5	6	7	8	Final
Denmark (Schack)	1	0	0	2	0	1	0	X	4
Sweden (Östlund)	0	1	0	0	3	0	3	X	7

Sheet C	1	2	3	4	5	6	7	8	Final
Wales (Wells)	0	0	0	0	1	0	X	X	1
Austria (Niederhauser)	1	0	2	1	0	3	X	X	7

Sheet D	1	2	3	4	5	6	7	8	Final
Norway (Ramsfjell)	0	1	0	2	0	0	5	X	8
Australia (Millikin)	1	0	1	0	1	0	0	X	3

Sheet E	1	2	3	4	5	6	7	8	Final
Czech Republic (Kovač)	0	0	1	1	0	0	1	0	3
Germany (Schöpp)	0	2	0	0	1	0	0	2	5

== Tiebreaker ==
Friday, April 20, 9:00

Team	1	2	3	4	5	6	7	8	9	Final
Italy (Menardi)	0	1	0	0	0	2	0	2	0	5
Scotland (Prentice)	1	0	2	0	1	0	1	0	2	7

== Playoffs ==
Qualification Game
R3	Switzerland	5
W3	Scotland	6

Quarterfinals
W1	Canada	5
W3	Scotland	2
W2	New Zealand	4
B2	Sweden	5
B1	Norway	6
B3	Australia	3
R1	Ireland	8
R2	Finland	4

Semifinals
W1	Canada	9
B2	Sweden	5
B1	Norway	4
R1	Ireland	5

Gold Medal Game
W1	Canada	5
R1	Ireland	6

Bronze Medal Game
B1	Norway	4
B2	Sweden	8

=== Qualification Game ===
Friday, April 20, 14:00

Sheet C	1	2	3	4	5	6	7	8	9	Final
Switzerland (Grossmann)	0	0	2	0	0	2	0	1	0	5
Scotland (Prentice)	0	1	0	1	1	0	2	0	1	6

=== Quarterfinals ===
Friday, April 20, 19:00

Sheet A	1	2	3	4	5	6	7	8	Final
Canada (Robertson)	1	0	0	0	2	0	0	2	5
Scotland (Prentice)	0	0	1	0	0	1	0	0	2

Sheet B	1	2	3	4	5	6	7	8	Final
Norway (Ramsfjell)	1	0	1	0	0	4	0	X	6
Australia (Millikin)	0	1	0	1	1	0	0	X	3

Sheet C	1	2	3	4	5	6	7	8	Final
Ireland (Kenny)	1	0	1	0	1	1	4	X	8
Finland (Kauste)	0	1	0	3	0	0	0	X	4

Sheet D	1	2	3	4	5	6	7	8	Final
New Zealand (Frauenlob)	0	0	0	0	1	0	1	2	4
Sweden (Östlund)	0	0	2	1	0	2	0	0	5

=== Semifinals ===
Saturday, April 21, 9:00

Sheet C	1	2	3	4	5	6	7	8	Final
Canada (Robertson)	0	3	0	3	0	3	0	X	9
Sweden (Östlund)	2	0	1	0	1	0	1	X	5

Sheet D	1	2	3	4	5	6	7	8	9	Final
Norway (Ramsfjell)	1	0	0	0	2	0	0	1	0	4
Ireland (Kenny)	0	1	0	0	0	2	1	0	1	5

=== Bronze medal game ===
Saturday, April 21, 14:00

Sheet D	1	2	3	4	5	6	7	8	Final
Norway (Ramsfjell)	1	0	0	1	0	2	0	X	4
Sweden (Östlund)	0	0	3	0	3	0	2	X	8

=== Gold medal game ===
Saturday, April 21, 14:00

Sheet C	1	2	3	4	5	6	7	8	9	Final
Canada (Robertson)	0	0	1	0	1	2	1	0	0	5
Ireland (Kenny)	0	0	0	4	0	0	0	1	1	6

2012 World Senior Men's Curling Championship Winner
Ireland
1st title
