= 2014 World Senior Curling Championships – Men's tournament =

2014 World Senior Curling Championships Men's tournament
- Host city: Dumfries, Scotland
- Arena: Dumfries Ice Bowl
- Dates: April 23–30
- Winner: Canada
- Curling club: Capital WC, Fredericton
- Skip: Wayne Tallon
- Third: Mike Kennedy
- Second: Mike Flannery
- Lead: Wade Blanchard
- Alternate: Charles Kingston
- Finalist: Sweden (Connie Östlund)

The men's tournament of the 2014 World Senior Curling Championships was held from April 23 to 30 at the Dumfries Ice Bowl in Dumfries, Scotland.

== Teams ==
The teams are listed as follows:

=== Group A ===
Australia	Canada	France	Germany	Japan
Skip: Hugh Millikin; Third: Wyatt Buck; Second: Jim Allan; Lead: Rob Gagnon; Alternate: John Anderson	Skip: Wayne Tallon; Third: Mike Kennedy; Second: Mike Flannery; Lead: Wade Blanchard; Alternate: Charles Kingston	Skip: Eric Richert; Third: Thierry Donard; Second: Alain Ciocca; Lead: Pascal Adam; Alternate: Andre Agostini	Skip: Rainer Schöpp; Third: Jamie Boutin; Second: Uli Sutor; Lead: Karl Stiller; Alternate: Adolf Geiselhardt	Skip: Masayasu Sato; Third: Tomiyasu Goshima; Second: Takahiro Hashimoto; Lead: Shouzo Itoh; Alternate: Hisashi Urashima
Latvia	Norway	Poland	Slovakia	
Skip: Pēteris Šveisbergs; Third: Ivars Černajs; Second: Jānis Rēdlihs; Lead: Aivars Purmalis; Alternate: Aivars Gulbis	Skip: Tormod Andreassen; Third: Kjell Berg; Second: Stig-Arne Gunnestad; Lead: Halvard Kverne	Skip: Andrzej Janowski; Third: Henryk Skowronski; Second: Jacek Goczol; Lead: Pawel Klos; Alternate: Ryszard Gintowt-Dziewaltowski	Skip: Peter Mocek; Third: Ondrej Marcek; Second: Juraj Kurth; Lead: Pavol Trstan	

=== Group B ===
Czech Republic	England	Finland	Hungary
Skip: Petr Kovač; Third: Roman Podlena; Second: Pavel Málek; Lead: Tomáš Král; Alternate: Aleš Plesek	Skip: John Sharp; Third: Tommy Campbell; Second: Keith Wilson; Lead: Alastair Fyfe; Alternate: Mike Robinson	Fourth: Kai Wist; Third: Timo Kauste; Second: Petri Kauste; Skip: Olli Rissanen; Alternate: Peter Landgrén	Skip: Andras Rókusfalvy; Third: László Kiss; Second: Mihály Verasztó; Lead: László Tolnai
New Zealand	Russia	Scotland	United States
Skip: Peter Becker; Third: Richard Morgan; Second: Nelson Ede; Lead: David Greer; Alternate: John Sanders	Skip: Sergey Korolenko; Third: Alexandr Kolesnikov; Second: Mikhail Rivkind; Lead: Oleg Badilin; Alternate: Sergey Narudinov	Skip: Keith Prentice; Third: Lockhart Steele; Second: Robert Anderson; Lead: Tommy Fleming; Alternate: Robert Clark	Skip: Jeff Wright; Third: Russ Armstrong; Second: Russ Brown; Lead: Nils Johansson; Alternate: Jim Wilson

=== Group C ===
Austria	Denmark	Ireland	Italy
Fourth: Herbert Planer; Third: Josef Leputsch; Second: Herbert Rabacher; Skip: Ronald Niederhauser; Alternate: Franz Datzinger	Skip: Bernd Hausted; Third: John Hansen; Second: Karsten Schmidt; Lead: Kurt Holm	Skip: John Jo Kenny; Third: Bill Gray; Second: David Whyte; Lead: Tony Tierney; Alternate: Neil Fyfe	Fourth: Mario Bologna; Skip: Danilo Capriolo; Second: Franco Manavella; Lead: Guido Barco; Alternate: Eraldo Quero
Netherlands	Sweden	Switzerland	Wales
Skip: Gustaaf van Imhoff; Third: Frank Kerkvliet; Second: Jos Wilmot; Lead: Bas Bennis	Skip: Connie Östlund; Third: Morgan Fredholm; Second: Lars Lindgren; Lead: Glen Franzen; Alternate: Lennart Carlsson	Skip: Jürg Gnägi; Third: Alfred Wyler; Second: Stefan Schneider; Lead: Rene Fuchs; Alternate: Dieter Emch	Skip: Chris Wells; Third: Hugh Meikle; Second: Richard Pougher; Lead: Gary Waddell; Alternate: Andrew Carr

== Round-robin standings ==
Final round-robin standings

Key
Teams to Playoffs
Teams to Qualification Game

Group A	Skip	W	L
Canada	Wayne Tallon	8	0
Australia	Hugh Millikin	7	1
Norway	Tormod Andreassen	6	2
Germany	Rainer Schöpp	5	3
Latvia	Pēteris Šveisbergs	4	4
Slovakia	Peter Mocek	2	6
Japan	Masayasu Sato	2	6
France	Eric Richert	1	7
Poland	Andrzej Janowski	1	7

Group B	Skip	W	L
England	John Sharp	6	1
United States	Jeff Wright	6	1
Scotland	Keith Prentice	5	2
Finland	Olli Rissanen	4	3
Czech Republic	Petr Kovač	3	4
Hungary	Andras Rókusfalvy	2	5
Russia	Sergey Korolenko	1	6
New Zealand	Peter Becker	1	6

Group C	Skip	W	L
Sweden	Connie Östlund	6	1
Ireland	John Jo Kenny	6	1
Netherlands	Gustaaf van Imhoff	5	2
Denmark	Bernd Hausted	4	3
Wales	Chris Wells	3	4
Switzerland	Jürg Gnägi	3	4
Italy	Danilo Capriolo	1	6
Austria	Ronald Niederhauser	0	7

== Round-robin results ==
=== Group A ===
==== Thursday, April 24 ====
Draw 1 8:00

Sheet E	1	2	3	4	5	6	7	8	Final
Germany (Schöpp)	1	0	1	0	2	0	1	0	5
Japan (Sato)	0	0	0	1	0	1	0	2	4

Sheet F	1	2	3	4	5	6	7	8	Final
Latvia (Šveisbergs)	1	0	0	0	2	1	2	0	6
Norway (Andreassen)	0	1	2	1	0	0	0	3	7

Draw 2 11:45

Sheet E	1	2	3	4	5	6	7	8	Final
Canada (Tallon)	0	4	3	3	1	0	X	X	11
France (Richert)	1	0	0	0	0	1	X	X	2

Sheet F	1	2	3	4	5	6	7	8	Final
Australia (Millikin)	4	2	1	0	3	0	X	X	10
Slovakia (Mocek)	0	0	0	1	0	0	X	X	1

Draw 4 19:30

Sheet A	1	2	3	4	5	6	7	8	Final
Australia (Millikin)	1	0	1	1	2	0	3	X	8
Japan (Sato)	0	1	0	0	0	1	0	X	2

==== Friday, April 25 ====
Draw 5 7:30

Sheet A	1	2	3	4	5	6	7	8	Final
Germany (Schöpp)	0	2	0	2	1	1	2	X	8
Slovakia (Mocek)	2	0	0	0	0	0	0	X	2

Sheet B	1	2	3	4	5	6	7	8	Final
Norway (Andreassen)	2	2	3	0	4	3	X	X	14
Poland (Janowski)	0	0	0	2	0	0	X	X	2

Draw 7 14:30

Sheet B	1	2	3	4	5	6	7	8	Final
Canada (Tallon)	5	1	0	2	0	4	X	X	12
Slovakia (Mocek)	0	0	1	0	1	0	X	X	2

Sheet C	1	2	3	4	5	6	7	8	9	Final
Japan (Sato)	0	0	1	0	0	1	0	1	0	3
Norway (Andreassen)	0	1	0	1	0	0	1	0	1	4

Sheet E	1	2	3	4	5	6	7	8	9	Final
France (Richert)	0	1	0	1	2	0	2	1	0	7
Australia (Millikin)	2	0	2	0	0	3	0	0	1	8

Draw 9 21:30

Sheet A	1	2	3	4	5	6	7	8	Final
Latvia (Šveisbergs)	0	1	4	0	5	2	X	X	12
France (Richert)	3	0	0	2	0	0	X	X	5

Sheet F	1	2	3	4	5	6	7	8	Final
Canada (Tallon)	3	2	2	0	3	3	X	X	13
Poland (Janowski)	0	0	0	1	0	0	X	X	1

==== Saturday, April 26 ====
Draw 10 8:30

Sheet A	1	2	3	4	5	6	7	8	Final
Norway (Andreassen)	0	2	0	1	0	1	0	0	4
Canada (Tallon)	0	0	2	0	1	0	0	2	5

Sheet B	1	2	3	4	5	6	7	8	Final
Australia (Millikin)	3	1	2	0	3	0	X	X	9
Germany (Schöpp)	0	0	0	1	0	1	X	X	2

Sheet C	1	2	3	4	5	6	7	8	Final
France (Richert)	2	1	0	2	0	0	0	1	6
Poland (Janowski)	0	0	1	0	1	1	2	0	5

Draw 11 12:00

Sheet C	1	2	3	4	5	6	7	8	Final
Slovakia (Mocek)	1	0	1	0	0	0	0	X	2
Latvia (Šveisbergs)	0	2	0	1	1	1	2	X	7

Draw 12 15:30

Sheet B	1	2	3	4	5	6	7	8	Final
France (Richert)	2	0	0	1	0	1	0	X	4
Japan (Sato)	0	6	2	0	1	0	3	X	12

Sheet D	1	2	3	4	5	6	7	8	Final
Germany (Schöpp)	0	1	0	2	0	1	0	X	4
Norway (Andreassen)	2	0	2	0	4	0	4	X	12

Draw 13 19:00

Sheet B	1	2	3	4	5	6	7	8	Final
Latvia (Šveisbergs)	0	1	0	0	0	2	0	X	3
Canada (Tallon)	1	0	2	1	1	0	1	X	6

Sheet D	1	2	3	4	5	6	7	8	Final
Poland (Janowski)	2	1	2	0	1	1	0	X	7
Slovakia (Mocek)	0	0	0	3	0	0	2	X	5

==== Sunday, April 27 ====
Draw 14 7:30

Sheet C	1	2	3	4	5	6	7	8	9	Final
Norway (Andreassen)	0	1	2	0	1	0	0	1	0	5
Australia (Millikin)	1	0	0	1	0	1	2	0	1	6

Sheet F	1	2	3	4	5	6	7	8	Final
Slovakia (Mocek)	0	2	1	0	1	1	0	1	6
Japan (Sato)	2	0	0	1	0	0	2	0	5

Draw 16 14:30

Sheet E	1	2	3	4	5	6	7	8	Final
Poland (Janowski)	0	1	0	1	0	1	0	X	3
Latvia (Šveisbergs)	1	0	2	0	4	0	0	X	7

Draw 17 18:00

Sheet D	1	2	3	4	5	6	7	8	Final
Australia (Millikin)	0	0	0	0	1	0	1	X	2
Canada (Tallon)	1	1	0	0	0	2	0	X	4

Sheet F	1	2	3	4	5	6	7	8	Final
Norway (Andreassen)	0	5	0	5	1	2	X	X	13
France (Richert)	1	0	1	0	0	0	X	X	2

Draw 18 21:30

Sheet D	1	2	3	4	5	6	7	8	Final
Japan (Sato)	1	0	0	1	0	2	1	0	5
Latvia (Šveisbergs)	0	3	1	0	2	0	0	3	9

Sheet F	1	2	3	4	5	6	7	8	Final
Poland (Janowski)	0	0	1	0	0	0	X	X	1
Germany (Schöpp)	1	2	0	2	3	3	X	X	11

==== Monday, April 28 ====
Draw 19 8:30

Sheet B	1	2	3	4	5	6	7	8	Final
Poland (Janowski)	2	0	0	0	0	0	X	X	2
Australia (Millikin)	0	2	2	3	4	4	X	X	15

Sheet F	1	2	3	4	5	6	7	8	9	Final
Japan (Sato)	1	0	2	0	0	0	1	1	0	5
Canada (Tallon)	0	2	0	0	2	1	0	0	1	6

Draw 20 12:00

Sheet B	1	2	3	4	5	6	7	8	Final
Germany (Schöpp)	0	1	0	1	0	0	0	2	4
Latvia (Šveisbergs)	1	0	0	0	0	1	1	0	3

Sheet D	1	2	3	4	5	6	7	8	9	Final
Slovakia (Mocek)	0	2	1	0	1	0	1	0	1	6
France (Richert)	1	0	0	1	0	2	0	1	0	5

Draw 22 19:00

Sheet A	1	2	3	4	5	6	7	8	Final
France (Richert)	1	0	0	2	0	0	0	X	3
Germany (Schöpp)	0	2	2	0	1	2	1	X	8

Sheet D	1	2	3	4	5	6	7	8	Final
Latvia (Šveisbergs)	1	0	0	0	0	1	X	X	2
Australia (Millikin)	0	1	1	3	1	0	X	X	6

Sheet E	1	2	3	4	5	6	7	8	Final
Slovakia (Mocek)	0	0	0	1	1	0	0	X	2
Norway (Andreassen)	4	1	1	0	0	1	1	X	8

==== Tuesday, April 29 ====
Draw 23 8:30

Sheet A	1	2	3	4	5	6	7	8	Final
Japan (Sato)	0	2	0	1	2	2	3	X	10
Poland (Janowski)	2	0	1	0	0	0	0	X	3

Sheet C	1	2	3	4	5	6	7	8	Final
Canada (Tallon)	0	2	1	0	2	4	X	X	9
Germany (Schöpp)	1	0	0	1	0	0	X	X	2

=== Group B ===
==== Thursday, April 24 ====
Draw 2 11:45

Sheet A	1	2	3	4	5	6	7	8	Final
Russia (Korolenko)	0	1	0	0	1	0	X	X	2
Scotland (Prentice)	1	0	2	2	0	2	X	X	7

Sheet B	1	2	3	4	5	6	7	8	Final
Czech Republic (Kovač)	1	0	1	0	1	0	0	X	3
Finland (Rissanen)	0	2	0	2	0	3	1	X	8

Sheet C	1	2	3	4	5	6	7	8	Final
England (Sharp)	1	3	0	1	0	1	3	X	9
New Zealand (Becker)	0	0	1	0	2	0	0	X	3

Sheet D	1	2	3	4	5	6	7	8	Final
Hungary (Rókusfalvy)	0	1	0	2	0	1	1	X	5
United States (Wright)	2	0	5	0	1	0	0	X	8

==== Friday, April 25 ====
Draw 5 7:30

Sheet D	1	2	3	4	5	6	7	8	Final
Russia (Korolenko)	2	0	0	2	0	1	0	X	5
Czech Republic (Kovač)	0	4	1	0	1	0	2	X	8

Sheet E	1	2	3	4	5	6	7	8	Final
New Zealand (Becker)	0	0	1	0	0	0	X	X	1
United States (Wright)	1	1	0	4	1	3	X	X	10

Sheet F	1	2	3	4	5	6	7	8	Final
England (Sharp)	2	0	3	0	1	5	0	X	11
Hungary (Rókusfalvy)	0	2	0	1	0	0	2	X	5

Draw 6 11:00

Sheet F	1	2	3	4	5	6	7	8	Final
Scotland (Prentice)	0	0	1	0	3	2	0	X	6
Finland (Rissanen)	2	0	0	0	0	0	1	X	3

Draw 8 18:00

Sheet B	1	2	3	4	5	6	7	8	Final
Russia (Korolenko)	1	0	0	0	2	0	X	X	3
United States (Wright)	0	3	1	1	0	4	X	X	9

Sheet D	1	2	3	4	5	6	7	8	Final
England (Sharp)	0	1	0	1	0	2	0	3	7
Finland (Rissanen)	2	0	0	0	1	0	1	0	4

Draw 9 21:30

Sheet C	1	2	3	4	5	6	7	8	Final
Hungary (Rókusfalvy)	0	0	0	2	0	1	0	X	3
Czech Republic (Kovač)	1	1	1	0	4	0	1	X	8

Sheet D	1	2	3	4	5	6	7	8	Final
Scotland (Prentice)	0	1	0	0	0	1	0	X	2
New Zealand (Becker)	1	0	1	2	0	0	1	X	5

==== Saturday, April 26 ====
Draw 12 15:30

Sheet A	1	2	3	4	5	6	7	8	Final
Czech Republic (Kovač)	1	1	0	2	1	1	0	2	8
New Zealand (Becker)	0	0	1	0	0	0	3	0	4

Sheet E	1	2	3	4	5	6	7	8	Final
United States (Wright)	2	1	0	1	1	0	1	X	6
Finland (Rissanen)	0	0	0	0	0	3	0	X	3

Sheet F	1	2	3	4	5	6	7	8	Final
Russia (Korolenko)	2	0	0	1	1	0	2	0	6
England (Sharp)	0	3	1	0	0	2	0	1	7

Draw 13 19:00

Sheet F	1	2	3	4	5	6	7	8	Final
Hungary (Rókusfalvy)	0	0	0	2	1	0	0	X	3
Scotland (Prentice)	0	2	3	0	0	0	0	X	5

==== Sunday, April 27 ====
Draw 15 11:00

Sheet B	1	2	3	4	5	6	7	8	Final
England (Sharp)	0	1	2	0	0	2	1	1	7
Scotland (Prentice)	3	0	0	3	2	0	0	0	8

Sheet E	1	2	3	4	5	6	7	8	Final
Hungary (Rókusfalvy)	0	2	1	2	0	0	1	X	6
Russia (Korolenko)	0	0	0	0	0	1	0	X	1

Draw 16 14:30

Sheet F	1	2	3	4	5	6	7	8	Final
Finland (Rissanen)	0	2	0	1	2	0	3	X	8
New Zealand (Becker)	2	0	0	0	0	1	0	X	3

Draw 18 21:30

Sheet A	1	2	3	4	5	6	7	8	Final
United States (Wright)	0	0	1	0	0	3	1	0	5
England (Sharp)	1	1	0	1	2	0	0	3	8

Sheet C	1	2	3	4	5	6	7	8	Final
Finland (Rissanen)	4	1	3	0	1	0	X	X	9
Russia (Korolenko)	0	0	0	1	0	1	X	X	2

Sheet E	1	2	3	4	5	6	7	8	Final
Scotland (Prentice)	0	4	2	1	0	0	1	X	8
Czech Republic (Kovač)	1	0	0	0	2	1	0	X	4

==== Monday, April 28 ====
Draw 20 12:00

Sheet A	1	2	3	4	5	6	7	8	Final
Finland (Rissanen)	0	2	0	4	0	1	0	X	7
Hungary (Rókusfalvy)	1	0	1	0	1	0	2	X	5

Sheet C	1	2	3	4	5	6	7	8	Final
United States (Wright)	3	2	1	0	1	0	1	X	8
Scotland (Prentice)	0	0	0	1	0	1	0	X	2

Sheet E	1	2	3	4	5	6	7	8	Final
Czech Republic (Kovač)	1	1	0	0	0	2	0	0	4
England (Sharp)	0	0	4	0	1	0	1	1	7

Draw 22 19:00

Sheet B	1	2	3	4	5	6	7	8	Final
New Zealand (Becker)	0	0	3	0	0	1	0	0	4
Hungary (Rókusfalvy)	1	0	0	2	1	0	2	1	7

Sheet F	1	2	3	4	5	6	7	8	Final
Czech Republic (Kovač)	0	0	0	2	0	0	X	X	2
United States (Wright)	1	2	1	0	1	2	X	X	7

==== Tuesday, April 29 ====
Draw 23 8:30

Sheet F	1	2	3	4	5	6	7	8	Final
New Zealand (Becker)	0	1	1	0	1	0	0	X	3
Russia (Korolenko)	2	0	0	2	0	1	1	X	6

=== Group C ===
==== Thursday, April 24 ====
Draw 1 8:00

Sheet A	1	2	3	4	5	6	7	8	Final
Italy (Capriolo)	2	0	0	3	2	1	2	X	10
Austria (Niederhauser)	0	1	3	0	0	0	0	X	4

Sheet B	1	2	3	4	5	6	7	8	Final
Switzerland (Gnägi)	2	0	0	2	0	0	0	1	5
Wales (Wells)	0	2	0	0	0	2	2	0	6

Sheet C	1	2	3	4	5	6	7	8	Final
Sweden (Östlund)	2	1	0	5	0	0	X	X	8
Ireland (Kenny)	0	0	1	0	1	1	X	X	3

Sheet D	1	2	3	4	5	6	7	8	Final
Denmark (Hausted)	0	2	0	0	0	0	1	X	3
Netherlands (van Imhoff)	2	0	1	1	1	1	0	X	6

Draw 4 19:30

Sheet C	1	2	3	4	5	6	7	8	9	Final
Austria (Niederhauser)	3	1	0	0	0	2	0	2	0	8
Wales (Wells)	0	0	3	3	1	0	1	0	2	10

Sheet D	1	2	3	4	5	6	7	8	Final
Italy (Capriolo)	0	2	0	0	1	0	X	X	3
Switzerland (Gnägi)	1	0	1	1	0	6	X	X	9

Sheet E	1	2	3	4	5	6	7	8	Final
Ireland (Kenny)	1	2	0	4	0	0	1	X	8
Netherlands (van Imhoff)	0	0	1	0	1	1	0	X	3

Sheet F	1	2	3	4	5	6	7	8	Final
Sweden (Östlund)	0	3	0	1	1	0	0	0	5
Denmark (Hausted)	1	0	1	0	0	1	1	3	7

==== Friday, April 25 ====
Draw 6 11:00

Sheet B	1	2	3	4	5	6	7	8	Final
Italy (Capriolo)	0	2	0	1	0	2	0	0	5
Netherlands (van Imhoff)	2	0	1	0	1	0	1	1	6

Sheet C	1	2	3	4	5	6	7	8	Final
Denmark (Hausted)	0	1	0	1	0	1	0	X	3
Switzerland (Gnägi)	3	0	2	0	3	0	2	X	10

Sheet D	1	2	3	4	5	6	7	8	Final
Sweden (Östlund)	3	0	2	0	1	0	1	0	7
Wales (Wells)	0	1	0	1	0	2	0	1	5

Draw 7 14:30

Sheet D	1	2	3	4	5	6	7	8	Final
Austria (Niederhauser)	1	0	0	0	1	0	X	X	2
Ireland (Kenny)	0	4	1	3	0	2	X	X	10

==== Saturday, April 26 ====
Draw 10 8:30

Sheet F	1	2	3	4	5	6	7	8	Final
Italy (Capriolo)	0	0	1	0	0	1	X	X	2
Sweden (Östlund)	2	1	0	3	2	0	X	X	8

Draw 11 12:00

Sheet A	1	2	3	4	5	6	7	8	9	Final
Switzerland (Gnägi)	0	1	0	3	0	1	0	1	0	6
Ireland (Kenny)	1	0	2	0	2	0	1	0	1	7

Sheet E	1	2	3	4	5	6	7	8	Final
Netherlands (van Imhoff)	0	2	1	1	0	1	2	X	7
Wales (Wells)	1	0	0	0	2	0	0	X	3

Sheet F	1	2	3	4	5	6	7	8	Final
Denmark (Hausted)	3	0	0	2	0	3	2	X	10
Austria (Niederhauser)	0	1	2	0	1	0	0	X	4

==== Sunday, April 27 ====
Draw 14 7:30

Sheet B	1	2	3	4	5	6	7	8	Final
Sweden (Östlund)	2	0	1	2	0	2	X	X	7
Austria (Niederhauser)	0	1	0	0	1	0	X	X	2

Sheet E	1	2	3	4	5	6	7	8	Final
Denmark (Hausted)	1	0	2	0	0	4	1	X	8
Italy (Capriolo)	0	1	0	2	2	0	0	X	5

Draw 15 11:00

Sheet F	1	2	3	4	5	6	7	8	Final
Switzerland (Gnägi)	0	0	0	1	0	2	0	1	4
Netherlands (van Imhoff)	0	1	1	0	2	0	1	0	5

Draw 16 14:30

Sheet B	1	2	3	4	5	6	7	8	Final
Ireland (Kenny)	4	1	0	2	0	4	X	X	11
Denmark (Hausted)	0	0	1	0	1	0	X	X	2

Sheet C	1	2	3	4	5	6	7	8	Final
Wales (Wells)	0	1	0	1	0	3	0	1	6
Italy (Capriolo)	1	0	1	0	1	0	1	0	4

Draw 17 18:00

Sheet A	1	2	3	4	5	6	7	8	Final
Netherlands (van Imhoff)	0	1	0	1	0	2	X	X	4
Sweden (Östlund)	2	0	4	0	4	0	X	X	10

Sheet E	1	2	3	4	5	6	7	8	Final
Austria (Niederhauser)	1	0	1	1	0	0	X	X	3
Switzerland (Gnägi)	0	4	0	0	3	4	X	X	11

==== Monday, April 28 ====
Draw 19 08:30

Sheet A	1	2	3	4	5	6	7	8	Final
Wales (Wells)	2	0	1	0	1	0	0	X	4
Denmark (Hausted)	0	3	0	2	0	2	2	X	9

Sheet C	1	2	3	4	5	6	7	8	Final
Netherlands (van Imhoff)	1	0	2	0	3	1	0	X	7
Austria (Niederhauser)	0	1	0	1	0	0	1	X	3

Sheet D	1	2	3	4	5	6	7	8	Final
Ireland (Kenny)	1	0	1	2	0	2	0	X	6
Italy (Capriolo)	0	1	0	0	1	0	1	X	3

Sheet E	1	2	3	4	5	6	7	8	Final
Switzerland (Gnägi)	0	3	0	1	0	0	1	0	5
Sweden (Östlund)	1	0	1	0	2	1	0	1	6

Draw 21 15:30

Sheet F	1	2	3	4	5	6	7	8	Final
Wales (Wells)	0	0	0	1	0	0	X	X	1
Ireland (Kenny)	2	2	4	0	0	4	X	X	12

== Playoffs ==
Qualification Game
A3	Norway	7
C3	Netherlands	6

Quarterfinals
A1	Canada	6
B3	Scotland	5
C2	Ireland	4
B2	United States	5
A2	Australia	7
B1	England	4
A3	Norway	6
C1	Sweden	7

Semifinals
A1	Canada	5
B2	United States	4
A2	Australia	3
C1	Sweden	5

Gold Medal Game
A1	Canada	7
C1	Sweden	2

Bronze Medal Game
B2	United States	3
A2	Australia	6

=== Qualification Game ===
Tuesday, April 29, 14:00

Sheet C	1	2	3	4	5	6	7	8	Final
Norway (Andreassen)	0	0	2	1	0	3	0	1	7
Netherlands (van Imhoff)	0	2	0	0	3	0	1	0	6

=== Quarterfinals ===
Tuesday, April 29, 19:30

Sheet A	1	2	3	4	5	6	7	8	Final
Ireland (Kenny)	0	0	0	2	1	0	0	1	4
United States (Wright)	1	0	1	0	0	2	1	0	5

Sheet D	1	2	3	4	5	6	7	8	Final
Norway (Andreassen)	0	0	2	0	1	0	3	0	6
Sweden (Östlund)	1	2	0	1	0	2	0	1	7

Sheet E	1	2	3	4	5	6	7	8	Final
Australia (Millikin)	0	0	0	2	0	2	3	X	7
England (Sharp)	0	1	1	0	2	0	0	X	4

Sheet F	1	2	3	4	5	6	7	8	Final
Canada (Tallon)	1	0	1	1	0	1	0	2	6
Scotland (Prentice)	0	1	0	0	2	0	2	0	5

=== Semifinals ===
Wednesday, April 30, 8:00

Sheet C	1	2	3	4	5	6	7	8	Final
Canada (Tallon)	0	1	0	2	0	1	0	1	5
United States (Wright)	0	0	1	0	2	0	1	0	4

Sheet B	1	2	3	4	5	6	7	8	Final
Sweden (Östlund)	0	0	0	1	0	3	0	1	5
Australia (Millikin)	0	1	0	0	1	0	1	0	3

=== Bronze medal game ===
Wednesday, April 30, 12:30

Sheet D	1	2	3	4	5	6	7	8	Final
United States (Wright)	0	1	0	2	0	0	0	X	3
Australia (Millikin)	2	0	1	0	0	3	0	X	6

=== Gold medal game ===
Wednesday, April 30, 12:30

Sheet E	1	2	3	4	5	6	7	8	Final
Canada (Tallon)	2	0	2	1	2	0	X	X	7
Sweden (Östlund)	0	1	0	0	0	1	X	X	2
