= Rob Vilain =

Dutch curler

Rob Vilain is a Dutch curler from the Curling Club PWA. He has curled in 10 European Curling Championships. He has only skipped in one though, that being the 2001 championships where he finished in 16th place. He has also been in the 1994 World Championships, when he was a second for Wim Neeleman. They finished in 7th place.

== Teams ==
=== Men's ===
Season	Skip	Third	Second	Lead	Alternate	Coach	Events
1991–92	Wim Neeleman	Gustaf van Imhoff	Floris van Imhoff	Rob Vilain			ECC 1991 (12th)
1992–93	Wim Neeleman	Gustaf van Imhoff	Andreas van Imhoff	Rob Vilain		Darrell Ell	ECC 1992 (10th)
1993–94	Wim Neeleman	Floris van Imhoff	Rob Vilain	Jeroen van Dillewijn	Erik A van der Zwan (ECC), Gustaf van Imhoff (WCC)		ECC 1993 (8th); WMCC 1994 (7th)
1994–95	Wim Neeleman	Floris van Imhoff	Rob Vilain	Erik A van der Zwan	Jeroen Van Dillewijn		ECC 1994 (8th)
1995–96	Wim Neeleman	Floris van Imhoff	Rob Vilain	Erik A van der Zwan	Gustaf van Imhoff	Armin Harder	ECC 1996 (13th)
1996–97	Floris van Imhoff	Gustaf van Imhoff	Rob Vilain	Erik A van der Zwan	Wim Neeleman	Armin Harder	ECC 1996 (12th)
1997–98	Floris van Imhoff	Rob Vilain	Gustaf van Imhoff	Jaap Veerman	Erik A van der Zwan	Armin Harder	ECC 1997 (12th)
1998–99	Floris van Imhoff	Christian Dupont-Roc	Rob Vilain	Jaap Veerman	Gustaf van Imhoff		ECC 1998 (9th)
2000–01	Christian Dupont-Roc	Floris van Imhoff	Rob Vilain	Jaap Veerman	Robert van der Cammen	Darrell Ell, Gail Ell	ECC 2000 (9th)
2001–02	Rob Vilain	Reg Wiebe	Willem Pronk	Walter Verbueken	Steve van der Cammen	Jaap Veerman	ECC 2001 (16th)
2007–08	Reg Wiebe	Steve van der Cammen	Mark Neeleman	Mark Rurup	Rob Vilain	Bill Charlebois	ECC 2007 (17th)
2008–09	Rob Vilain	Brian Doucet	Miles Maclure	Erik Dijkstra	Laurens van der Windt	Marlijn Muller	ECC 2008 (14th)
2010–11	Rob Vilain	Brian Doucet	Miles Maclure	Erik Dijkstra	Laurens van der Windt	Björn Schröder	ECC 2010 (10th)

=== Mixed ===
Season	Skip	Third	Second	Lead	Alternate	Events
2007–08	Rob Vilain (fourth)	Shari Leibbrandt-Demmon (skip)	Marlijn Muller	Laurens van der Windt	Cecilia van Dorp, Mark Neeleman	EMxCC 2007 (17th)
