= Steven van der Cammen =

Dutch curler

- Born: 8 September 1980 (age 45); Rotterdam, Netherlands
- Occupation: curler

Stephanus Robert "Steven" van der Cammen (born 8 September 1980, Rotterdam) is a Dutch curler from the Curling Club Utrecht. He is the current third on the Dutch national team.

At the 2001, European Championships, he played as an alternate for Rob Vilain's 16th place team. In 2002, he was lead for Reg Wiebe's 12th place European Championship team. In 2003, he was lead for Floris van Imhoff's 13th place European Championship team. In 2004, he was second for Erik van der Zwan's 15th place team at the European Championships. In 2005, he was third for Reg Wiebes's 19th place team.

His older sister Ellen is also a curler.

== References, external links ==
- Coccu Curling Club
