= Christian Dupont-Roc =

French male curler

- Curler ♂
- Born: Megève, Haute-Savoie, France

Team
- Curling club: Club de sports Megève, Megève

Curling career
- Member Association: France, Netherlands
- World Championship: 2 (1986, 1989)
- European Championship: 5 (1985, 1988, 1993, 1998, 2000)
- Other appearances: World Junior Championships: 2 (1983, 1984)

Christian Dupont-Roc (born in Megève, Haute-Savoie, France) is a French and Dutch curler.

== Teams ==
=== France ===
Season	Skip	Third	Second	Lead	Alternate	Events
1982–83	Dominique Dupont-Roc	Patrick Philippe	Christian Dupont-Roc	Thierry Mercier		WJCC 1983 (9th)
1983–84	Dominique Dupont-Roc	Philippe Pomi	Christian Dupont-Roc	Thierry Mercier		WJCC 1984 (8th)
1985–86	Dominique Dupont-Roc	Christian Dupont-Roc	Thierry Mercier	Daniel Cosetto (ECC), Patrick Philippe (WCC)		ECC 1985 (11th); WCC 1986 (7th)
1988–89	Dominique Dupont-Roc	Christian Dupont-Roc	Daniel Cosetto	Patrick Philippe	Thierry Mercier (WCC)	ECC 1988 (5th); WCC 1989 (9th)
1993–94	Jan Henri Ducroz	Christian Dupont-Roc	Lionel Tournier	Cyrille Prunet	Thierry Mercier	ECC 1993 (6th)

=== Netherlands ===
Season	Skip	Third	Second	Lead	Alternate	Coach	Events
1998–99	Floris van Imhoff	Christian Dupont-Roc	Rob Vilain	Jaap Veerman	Gustaf van Imhoff		ECC 1998 (9th)
2000–01	Christian Dupont-Roc	Floris van Imhoff	Rob Vilain	Jaap Veerman	Robert van der Cammen	Darrell Ell, Gail Ell	ECC 2000 (9th)
