= 2010 European Curling Championships – Men's tournament =

2010 European Curling Championships Men's tournament
- Host city: Champéry, Switzerland
- Arena: Palladium Ice Hall
- Dates: December 4–11, 2010
- Winner: Norway
- Skip: Thomas Ulsrud
- Third: Torger Nergård
- Second: Christoffer Svae
- Lead: Håvard Vad Petersson
- Alternate: Markus Hoiberg
- Finalist: Denmark

The men's tournament of the 2010 European Curling Championships took place from December 4 – 11, 2010. The winners of the Group C tournament in Howwood, Scotland (Slovakia and Belarus) move on to the Group B tournament in Monthey. The top eight men's teams at the 2010 ECC represented their nations at the 2011 Ford World Men's Curling Championship in Regina, Saskatchewan, Canada.

A change in the system of play sees the C group games played as a qualifier and was held from September 24–28, 2010. Ranking from the 2009 European Curling Championships determined the group placings for the 2010 tournament.

== Group A ==
=== Teams ===
Czech Republic	Denmark	France	Germany	Netherlands
Skip: Jiří Snítil Third: Martin Snítil; Second: Karel Uher; Lead: Marek Vydra; Alternate: Jakub Bares	Skip: Rasmus Stjerne Third: Mikkel Krause; Second: Mikkel Poulsen; Lead: Troels Harry; Alternate: Johnny Frederiksen	Skip: Thomas Dufour Third: Tony Angiboust; Second: Lionel Roux; Lead: Wilfrid Coulot; Alternate: Jan Ducroz	Skip: Andy Kapp Third: Daniel Herberg; Second: Markus Messenzehl; Lead: Holger Höhne; Alternate: Andreas Kempf	Skip: Rob Vilain Third: Brian Doucet; Second: Miles Maclure; Lead: Erik Dijkstra; Alternate: Laurens Van Der Windt
Norway	Russia	Scotland	Sweden	Switzerland
Skip: Thomas Ulsrud Third: Torger Nergård; Second: Christoffer Svae; Lead: Håvard Vad Petersson; Alternate: Markus Hoiberg	Skip: Andrey Drozdov Third: Alexander Kirikov; Second: Alexander Kozyrev; Lead: Alexey Stukalsky; Alternate: Anton Kalalb	Skip: Hammy McMillan Third: David Smith; Second: Ross Paterson; Lead: Alexander Gilmour; Alternate: David Murdoch	Skip: Niklas Edin Third: Sebastian Kraupp; Second: Fredrik Lindberg; Lead: Viktor Kjäll; Alternate: Oskar Eriksson	Skip: Christof Schwaller Third: Marco Ramstein; Second: Robert Hürlimann; Lead: Urs Eichhorn; Alternate: Toni Müller

=== Standings ===
Key
Countries to Playoffs
Countries relegated to 2011 Group B

Country	Skip	W	L	PF	PA	Ends Won	Ends Lost	Blank Ends	Stolen Ends	Shot Pct
Switzerland	Christof Schwaller	7	2	57	55	33	37	12	6	78%
Norway	Thomas Ulsrud	7	2	58	37	36	26	18	7	82%
Germany	Andy Kapp	7	2	61	40	39	28	11	10	78%
Denmark	Rasmus Stjerne	6	3	53	44	37	31	14	12	75%
Scotland	Hammy McMillan	5	4	49	45	35	28	23	11	80%
Sweden	Niklas Edin	5	4	58	47	36	36	14	6	82%
Czech Republic	Jiří Snítil	3	6	48	54	34	35	13	9	75%
France	Thomas Dufour	3	6	33	48	24	32	27	4	73%
Russia	Andrey Drozdov	1	8	46	60	33	38	15	3	69%
Netherlands	Rob Vilain	1	8	27	60	22	38	20	3	70%

=== Results ===
==== Draw 1 ====
Saturday, December 4, 12:00

Sheet A	1	2	3	4	5	6	7	8	9	10	Final
Sweden (Edin)	0	0	3	0	0	2	1	0	2	X	8
Netherlands (Vilain) 🔨	0	1	0	1	0	0	0	1	0	X	3

Sheet B	1	2	3	4	5	6	7	8	9	10	Final
Norway (Ulsrud) 🔨	0	0	0	0	0	2	0	0	2	X	4
Scotland (McMillan)	0	0	0	0	0	0	1	0	0	X	1

Sheet C	1	2	3	4	5	6	7	8	9	10	Final
France (Dufour) 🔨	0	1	0	0	3	0	2	1	X	X	7
Switzerland (Schwaller)	0	0	0	1	0	0	0	0	X	X	1

Sheet D	1	2	3	4	5	6	7	8	9	10	Final
Czech Republic (Snítil)	0	3	0	0	2	0	1	1	0	0	7
Denmark (Stjerne) 🔨	2	0	1	2	0	0	0	0	1	2	8

Sheet E	1	2	3	4	5	6	7	8	9	10	Final
Germany (Kapp) 🔨	2	1	0	2	2	0	X	X	X	X	7
Russia (Drozdov)	0	0	1	0	0	1	X	X	X	X	2

==== Draw 2 ====
Saturday, December 4, 20:00

Sheet A	1	2	3	4	5	6	7	8	9	10	Final
Denmark (Stjerne)	0	1	0	0	1	1	0	0	1	2	6
France (Dufour) 🔨	1	0	1	0	0	0	0	1	0	0	3

Sheet B	1	2	3	4	5	6	7	8	9	10	Final
Switzerland (Schwaller)	0	2	0	0	0	1	0	1	1	X	5
Netherlands (Vilain) 🔨	0	0	1	0	1	0	1	0	0	X	3

Sheet C	1	2	3	4	5	6	7	8	9	10	Final
Russia (Drozdov) 🔨	1	0	0	0	1	0	3	0	1	0	6
Sweden (Edin)	0	0	0	2	0	2	0	2	0	1	7

Sheet D	1	2	3	4	5	6	7	8	9	10	Final
Scotland (McMillan)	0	0	2	0	0	0	0	3	0	X	5
Germany (Kapp) 🔨	0	1	0	0	2	1	2	0	3	X	9

Sheet E	1	2	3	4	5	6	7	8	9	10	Final
Norway (Ulsrud) 🔨	0	1	0	2	0	1	0	2	1	X	7
Czech Republic (Snítil)	0	0	1	0	1	0	1	0	0	X	3

==== Draw 3 ====
Sunday, December 5, 16:00

Sheet A	1	2	3	4	5	6	7	8	9	10	11	Final
Scotland (McMillan)	0	0	1	0	1	0	0	2	0	2	2	8
Russia (Drozdov) 🔨	0	2	0	1	0	0	2	0	1	0	0	6

Sheet B	1	2	3	4	5	6	7	8	9	10	Final
Germany (Kapp) 🔨	0	0	2	1	0	2	0	1	0	1	7
Czech Republic (Snítil)	0	0	0	0	1	0	1	0	3	0	5

Sheet C	1	2	3	4	5	6	7	8	9	10	Final
Norway (Ulsrud) 🔨	0	1	0	1	0	0	1	0	2	0	5
Denmark (Stjerne)	0	0	1	0	1	1	0	2	0	1	6

Sheet D	1	2	3	4	5	6	7	8	9	10	11	Final
France (Dufour) 🔨	0	0	0	2	0	0	1	0	0	0	0	3
Netherlands (Vilain)	0	0	0	0	2	0	0	1	0	0	1	4

Sheet E	1	2	3	4	5	6	7	8	9	10	Final
Sweden (Edin)	0	1	2	0	0	0	2	0	1	0	6
Switzerland (Schwaller) 🔨	1	0	0	0	1	1	0	2	0	2	7

==== Draw 4 ====
Monday, December 6, 8:00

Sheet A	1	2	3	4	5	6	7	8	9	10	Final
Germany (Kapp)	0	0	0	0	0	1	0	2	0	X	3
Norway (Ulsrud) 🔨	1	0	3	1	0	0	1	0	1	X	7

Sheet B	1	2	3	4	5	6	7	8	9	10	Final
Sweden (Edin) 🔨	0	2	2	0	1	0	0	1	X	X	6
France (Dufour)	0	0	0	0	0	1	0	0	X	X	1

Sheet C	1	2	3	4	5	6	7	8	9	10	Final
Scotland (McMillan) 🔨	2	0	0	1	2	1	0	1	0	X	7
Czech Republic (Snítil)	0	2	0	0	0	0	1	0	1	X	4

Sheet D	1	2	3	4	5	6	7	8	9	10	Final
Switzerland (Schwaller)	0	0	2	0	2	0	0	3	0	1	8
Russia (Drozdov) 🔨	2	0	0	2	0	1	1	0	1	0	7

Sheet E	1	2	3	4	5	6	7	8	9	10	Final
Netherlands (Vilain) 🔨	1	0	0	0	0	1	0	0	X	X	2
Denmark (Stjerne)	0	3	0	0	1	0	3	1	X	X	8

==== Draw 5 ====
Monday, December 6th, 16:00

Sheet A	1	2	3	4	5	6	7	8	9	10	Final
Czech Republic (Snítil)	0	1	0	2	0	2	0	0	1	0	6
Sweden (Edin) 🔨	2	0	3	0	1	0	2	0	0	1	9

Sheet B	1	2	3	4	5	6	7	8	9	10	Final
Denmark (Stjerne)	0	1	0	1	0	0	X	X	X	X	2
Germany (Kapp) 🔨	3	0	2	0	1	2	X	X	X	X	8

Sheet C	1	2	3	4	5	6	7	8	9	10	Final
Netherlands (Vilain) 🔨	0	1	0	0	2	1	0	0	1	0	5
Russia (Drozdov)	1	0	1	3	0	0	1	0	0	1	7

Sheet D	1	2	3	4	5	6	7	8	9	10	Final
Norway (Ulsrud) 🔨	0	2	1	0	1	0	2	0	X	X	6
France (Dufour)	0	0	0	0	0	1	0	1	X	X	2

Sheet E	1	2	3	4	5	6	7	8	9	10	Final
Switzerland (Schwaller) 🔨	0	2	0	0	2	0	3	0	1	X	8
Scotland (McMillan)	0	0	2	1	0	1	0	2	0	X	6

==== Draw 6 ====
Tuesday, December 7, 10:00

Sheet A	1	2	3	4	5	6	7	8	9	10	Final
Russia (Drozdov)	0	0	0	0	0	0	1	0	1	X	2
Denmark (Stjerne) 🔨	0	1	1	0	0	1	0	2	0	X	5

Sheet B	1	2	3	4	5	6	7	8	9	10	Final
Czech Republic (Snítil) 🔨	0	1	1	0	0	1	0	X	X	X	3
Switzerland (Schwaller)	1	0	0	3	2	0	2	X	X	X	8

Sheet C	1	2	3	4	5	6	7	8	9	10	Final
Sweden (Edin)	0	1	0	0	2	0	1	0	0	X	4
Norway (Ulsrud) 🔨	1	0	0	2	0	1	0	0	2	X	6

Sheet D	1	2	3	4	5	6	7	8	9	10	Final
Netherlands (Vilain)	0	0	0	0	0	0	2	0	0	X	2
Scotland (McMillan) 🔨	1	0	0	0	1	1	0	1	2	X	6

Sheet E	1	2	3	4	5	6	7	8	9	10	Final
France (Dufour) 🔨	0	0	0	1	0	1	0	0	X	X	2
Germany (Kapp)	2	0	0	0	1	0	3	2	X	X	8

==== Draw 7 ====
Tuesday, December 7, 19:00

Sheet A	1	2	3	4	5	6	7	8	9	10	Final
Norway (Ulsrud) 🔨	2	0	2	0	0	0	0	2	0	1	7
Switzerland (Schwaller)	0	3	0	0	0	0	2	0	4	0	9

Sheet B	1	2	3	4	5	6	7	8	9	10	Final
France (Dufour) 🔨	2	0	0	0	0	1	1	0	0	3	7
Russia (Drozdov)	0	0	2	0	1	0	0	2	0	0	5

Sheet C	1	2	3	4	5	6	7	8	9	10	Final
Denmark (Stjerne) 🔨	1	0	0	0	0	0	0	1	0	X	2
Scotland (McMillan)	0	0	1	2	0	1	0	0	1	X	5

Sheet D	1	2	3	4	5	6	7	8	9	10	Final
Germany (Kapp) 🔨	2	0	1	0	1	0	2	0	0	1	7
Sweden (Edin)	0	2	0	2	0	1	0	0	1	0	6

Sheet E	1	2	3	4	5	6	7	8	9	10	Final
Czech Republic (Snítil) 🔨	0	1	0	2	1	0	3	X	X	X	7
Netherlands (Vilain)	0	0	1	0	0	0	0	X	X	X	1

==== Draw 8 ====
Wednesday, December 8, 16:00

Sheet A	1	2	3	4	5	6	7	8	9	10	11	Final
France (Dufour) 🔨	0	0	0	1	0	0	0	1	2	0	1	5
Scotland (McMillan)	0	1	0	0	0	2	0	0	0	1	0	4

Sheet B	1	2	3	4	5	6	7	8	9	10	Final
Netherlands (Vilain)	0	0	1	0	0	0	1	X	X	X	2
Norway (Ulsrud) 🔨	1	0	0	4	2	1	0	X	X	X	8

Sheet C	1	2	3	4	5	6	7	8	9	10	Final
Switzerland (Schwaller) 🔨	1	0	0	2	1	0	1	0	0	1	6
Germany (Kapp)	0	1	1	0	0	1	0	1	0	0	4

Sheet D	1	2	3	4	5	6	7	8	9	10	11	Final
Russia (Drozdov) 🔨	0	1	0	0	0	0	1	0	0	2	0	4
Czech Republic (Snítil)	0	0	0	1	0	1	0	1	1	0	1	5

Sheet E	1	2	3	4	5	6	7	8	9	10	Final
Denmark (Stjerne) 🔨	1	0	0	0	1	0	0	1	1	0	4
Sweden (Edin)	0	1	1	1	0	2	0	0	0	2	7

==== Draw 9 ====
Thursday, December 9th, 8:00

Sheet A	1	2	3	4	5	6	7	8	9	10	Final
Netherlands (Vilain)	0	2	0	1	0	0	0	0	2	0	5
Germany (Kapp) 🔨	1	0	1	0	2	0	2	1	0	1	8

Sheet B	1	2	3	4	5	6	7	8	9	10	Final
Scotland (McMillan)	1	0	1	0	0	1	0	1	1	2	7
Sweden (Edin) 🔨	0	2	0	0	2	0	1	0	0	0	5

Sheet C	1	2	3	4	5	6	7	8	9	10	Final
Czech Republic (Snítil) 🔨	1	0	0	2	0	1	0	2	2	X	8
France (Dufour)	0	0	1	0	0	0	2	0	0	X	3

Sheet D	1	2	3	4	5	6	7	8	9	10	Final
Denmark (Stjerne) 🔨	1	0	2	0	2	2	0	3	2	X	12
Switzerland (Schwaller)	0	1	0	2	0	0	2	0	0	X	5

Sheet E	1	2	3	4	5	6	7	8	9	10	Final
Russia (Drozdov) 🔨	1	0	1	0	2	0	2	0	1	X	7
Norway (Ulsrud)	0	2	0	2	0	1	0	3	0	X	8

==== Tie-breaker 7/8 game ====
Thursday, December 9, 20:00

Sheet C	1	2	3	4	5	6	7	8	9	10	Final
France (Dufour)	0	1	0	0	0	1	0	1	0	X	3
Czech Republic (Snitil) 🔨	2	0	1	2	0	0	2	0	1	X	8

==== World Challenge ====
===== Challenge 1 =====
Friday, December 10, 20:00

Sheet A	1	2	3	4	5	6	7	8	9	10	Final
France (Dufour) 🔨	1	1	1	0	2	0	3	2	1	X	11
Italy (Retornaz)	0	0	0	3	0	2	0	0	0	X	5

===== Challenge 2 =====
Saturday, December 11, 09:30

Sheet A	1	2	3	4	5	6	7	8	9	10	Final
France (Dufour)	1	0	2	0	0	0	3	0	1	0	7
Italy (Retornaz) 🔨	0	2	0	2	0	1	0	2	0	1	8

===== Challenge 3 =====
Saturday, December 11, 13:00

Sheet A	1	2	3	4	5	6	7	8	9	10	Final
France (Dufour) 🔨	2	0	4	0	0	0	0	1	1	X	8
Italy (Retornaz)	0	2	0	1	1	0	0	0	0	X	4

France moves on to the 2011 World Men's Championships.

=== Playoffs ===
Page playoff system
1	Switzerland	4
2	Norway	5
3	Germany	5
4	Denmark	10

Semifinal
1	Switzerland	7
4	Denmark	9

Gold-medal game
2	Norway	5
4	Denmark	3

Bronze-medal game
1	Switzerland	7
3	Germany	4

==== Page 1 vs. 2 ====
Thursday, December 9, 20:00

Sheet B	1	2	3	4	5	6	7	8	9	10	Final
Switzerland (Schwaller) 🔨	0	0	2	0	0	0	0	0	2	0	4
Norway (Ulsrud)	0	0	0	0	1	2	1	0	0	1	5

Player percentages
Switzerland		Norway	
Urs Eichorn	72%	Håvard Vad Petersson	82%
Robert Hürlimann	83%	Christoffer Svae	71%
Marco Ramstein	86%	Torger Nergård	78%
Christof Schwaller	76%	Thomas Ulsrud	86%
Total	80%	Total	79%

==== Page 3 vs. 4 ====
Thursday, December 9, 20:00

Sheet E	1	2	3	4	5	6	7	8	9	10	Final
Germany (Kapp) 🔨	1	0	1	0	2	0	0	1	0	X	5
Denmark (Stjerne)	0	1	0	1	0	1	2	0	5	X	10

Player percentages
Germany		Denmark	
Holger Höhne	51%	Troels Harry	78%
Markus Messenzehl	75%	Mikkel Poulsen	89%
Daniel Herberg	66%	Mikkel Krause	63%
Andy Kapp	61%	Rasmus Stjerne	82%
Total	63%	Total	78%

==== Semifinal ====
Friday, December 10, 16:00

Sheet D	1	2	3	4	5	6	7	8	9	10	Final
Switzerland (Schwaller) 🔨	0	0	2	0	1	0	2	0	2	0	7
Denmark (Stjerne)	0	1	0	3	0	3	0	1	0	1	9

Player percentages
Switzerland		Denmark	
Urs Eichorn	81%	Troels Harry	88%
Robert Hürlimann	68%	Mikkel Poulsen	86%
Marco Ramstein	70%	Mikkel Krause	75%
Christof Schwaller	69%	Rasmus Stjerne	79%
Total	72%	Total	82%

==== Bronze-medal game ====
Saturday, December 11, 8:00

Sheet B	1	2	3	4	5	6	7	8	9	10	Final
Switzerland (Schwaller) 🔨	1	0	2	0	0	1	1	0	2	X	7
Germany (Kapp)	0	1	0	2	0	0	0	1	0	X	4

Player percentages
Switzerland		Germany	
Urs Eichorn	74%	Andreas Kempf	93%
Robert Hürlimann	80%	Markus Messenzehl	76%
Marco Ramstein	76%	Daniel Herberg	74%
Christof Schwaller	86%	Andy Kapp	66%
Total	79%	Total	77%

==== Gold-medal game ====
Saturday, December 11, 16:00

Sheet C	1	2	3	4	5	6	7	8	9	10	Final
Norway (Ulsrud) 🔨	1	0	0	1	0	0	2	0	0	1	5
Denmark (Stjerne)	0	0	1	0	0	1	0	0	1	0	3

Player percentages
Norway		Denmark	
Håvard Vad Petersson	87%	Troels Harry	81%
Christoffer Svae	84%	Mikkel Poulsen	84%
Torger Nergård	88%	Mikkel Krause	74%
Thomas Ulsrud	73%	Rasmus Stjerne	81%
Total	83%	Total	80%

== Group B ==
=== Teams ===
Group B1

Austria	Belarus (advanced from 2010 C Group)	Bulgaria	Croatia
Skip: Harald Fendt Third: Christian Roth; Second: Florian Huber; Lead: Markus Forejtek; Alternate: Marcus Schmitt	Fourth: Ilya Kazlouski Third: Dzmitry Yarko; Second: Pavel Petrov; Skip: Dmitry Kirillov	Skip: Lubomir Velinov Third: Stoil Georgiev; Second: Kiril Kirilov; Lead: Stanimir Petrov; Alternate: Stanko Velinov	Skip: Mladen Domazetovic Third: Bojan Gabric; Second: Sasa Vidmar; Lead: Ante Kutle; Alternate: Davor Dzepina
Finland (relegated from 2009 A group)	Ireland	Latvia	Wales
Skip: Kalle Kiiskinen Third: Perttu Piilo; Second: Teemu Salo; Lead: Paavo Kuosmanen; Alternate: Juha Pekaristo	Skip: Robin Gray Third: John Kenny; Second: Bill Gray; Lead: Neil Fyfe; Alternate: John Furey	Skip: Ritvars Gulbis Third: Ainars Gubils; Second: Normunds Šaršūns; Lead: Aivars Avotins	Skip: Adrian Meikle Third: Stuart Hills; Second: Andrew Tanner; Lead: James Pougher; Alternate: Richard Pougher

Group B2

Belgium	England	Estonia	Greece
Skip: Marc Suter Third: Thomas Suter; Second: Timothy Verreycken; Lead: Thomas Lemmens; Alternate: Peter Suter	Skip: Alan MacDougall Third: Andrew Reed; Second: Andrew Woolston; Lead: Tom Jaeggi; Alternate: Jamie Malton	Skip: Martin Lill Third: Siim Sildnik; Second: Ingar Mäesalu; Lead: Jan Anderson; Alternate: Harri Lill	Skip: Nikolaos Zacharias Third: Georgios Arampatzis; Second: Dionysios Karakostas; Lead: Dimitri Klasson; Alternate: Efstratios Kokkinellis
Hungary	Italy (relegated from 2009 A group)	Spain	Slovakia (advanced from 2010 C Group)
Skip: Gabor Riesz Third: Lajos Belleli; Second: Krisztian Hall; Lead: Gabor Molnar; Alternate: Andras Rokusfalvy	Skip: Joël Retornaz Third: Silvio Zanotelli; Second: Davide Zanotelli; Lead: Mirco Ferretti; Alternate: Daniele Ferrazza	Skip: Sergio Vez Labrador Third: Alberto Vez Bilbao; Second: Manuel Garcia Roman; Lead: Iniguo Ruiz de Eguilaz; Alternate: Egoitz Gordo Villamor	Skip: Pavol Pitonak Third: Frantisek Pitonak; Second: Tomas Pitonak; Lead: Peter Pitonak

=== Standings ===
Key
Countries to Playoffs

Group B1

Country	Skip	W	L
Latvia	Ritvars Gulbis	7	0
Ireland	Robin Gray	6	1
Finland	Kalle Kiiskinen	5	2
Wales	Adrian Meikle	4	3
Austria	Harald Fendt	3	4
Belarus	Dmitry Kirillov	2	5
Croatia	Mladen Domazetovic	1	6
Bulgaria	Lubomir Venilov	0	7

Group B2

Country	Skip	W	L
Italy	Joël Retornaz	7	0
Slovakia	Pavol Pitonak	5	2
Belgium	Mark Suter	4	3
Spain	Sergio Vez Labrador	4	3
Estonia	Martin Lill	3	4
England	Alan MacDougall	3	4
Hungary	Gabor Riesz	2	5
Greece	Nikolaos Zacharias	0	7

Tie-break rules:
Group B2
Rank 3	Belgium def. Spain, 8-4
Rank 5	Estonia def. England, 4-2

=== Results ===
Note: Bulgaria did not start any of their matches, resulting in an automatic walkover for each match.

==== Draw 1 ====
Saturday, December 4, 8:00

Sheet F	1	2	3	4	5	6	7	8	9	10	11	Final
Croatia (Domazetovic) 🔨	0	5	2	1	0	0	0	3	0	0	0	11
Belarus (Kirillov)	2	0	0	0	2	1	1	0	3	2	3	14

Sheet G	Final
Austria (Fendt)	W
Bulgaria (Venilov)	L

Sheet H	1	2	3	4	5	6	7	8	9	10	Final
Ireland (Gray)	1	0	3	0	1	2	0	1	0	X	8
Wales (Meikle) 🔨	0	3	0	1	0	0	1	0	1	X	6

Sheet J	1	2	3	4	5	6	7	8	9	10	Final
Finland (Kiiskinen) 🔨	2	0	0	2	0	0	0	1	0	X	5
Latvia (Gulbis)	0	1	1	0	4	1	2	0	0	X	9

Sheet K	1	2	3	4	5	6	7	8	9	10	Final
Slovakia (Pitonak)	0	0	0	2	0	0	2	2	0	0	6
Belgium (Suter) 🔨	0	1	0	0	1	0	0	0	2	1	5

Sheet L	1	2	3	4	5	6	7	8	9	10	Final
Hungary (Riesz)	0	0	0	0	0	1	X	X	X	X	1
England (MacDougall) 🔨	0	4	1	3	3	0	X	X	X	X	11

==== Draw 2 ====
Saturday, December 4, 16:00

Sheet F	1	2	3	4	5	6	7	8	9	10	Final
England (MacDougall) 🔨	3	0	1	0	3	2	1	X	X	X	10
Spain (Labrador)	0	0	0	1	0	0	0	X	X	X	1

Sheet G	1	2	3	4	5	6	7	8	9	10	11	Final
Greece (Zacharias)	2	0	1	0	3	0	0	1	0	1	0	8
Hungary (Riesz) 🔨	0	1	0	2	0	1	2	0	2	0	2	10

Sheet H	1	2	3	4	5	6	7	8	9	10	Final
Italy (Retornaz)	0	4	0	3	0	3	0	2	X	X	12
Belgium (Suter) 🔨	0	0	1	0	1	0	2	0	X	X	4

Sheet J	1	2	3	4	5	6	7	8	9	10	Final
Slovakia (Pitonak) 🔨	0	0	1	0	0	0	1	1	0	0	3
Estonia (Lill)	0	0	0	0	0	1	0	0	0	0	1

Sheet K	Final
Bulgaria (Venilov)	L
Croatia (Domazetovic)	W

Sheet L	1	2	3	4	5	6	7	8	9	10	Final
Wales (Meikle)	1	0	1	0	1	2	0	0	0	X	5
Finland (Kiiskinen) 🔨	0	4	0	4	0	0	0	2	1	X	11

==== Draw 3 ====
Sunday, December 5, 8:00

Sheet F	Final
Bulgaria (Venilov)	L
Finland (Kiiskinen)	W

Sheet G	1	2	3	4	5	6	7	8	9	10	Final
Wales (Meikle) 🔨	3	1	0	1	3	0	4	0	3	x	15
Croatia (Domazetovic)	0	0	2	0	0	1	0	3	0	x	6

Sheet H	1	2	3	4	5	6	7	8	9	10	Final
Latvia (Gulbis)	1	2	0	3	0	2	0	0	3	x	11
Belarus (Kirillov) 🔨	0	0	1	0	2	0	0	2	0	x	5

Sheet J	1	2	3	4	5	6	7	8	9	10	Final
Austria (Fendt) 🔨	0	0	1	0	1	0	1	0	0	x	3
Ireland (Gray)	1	1	0	3	0	2	0	1	1	x	9

Sheet K	1	2	3	4	5	6	7	8	9	10	Final
Spain (Labrador)	1	0	3	0	3	0	2	4	0	x	13
Greece (Zacharias) 🔨	0	2	0	1	0	4	0	0	0	x	7

Sheet L	1	2	3	4	5	6	7	8	9	10	Final
Estonia (Lill)	1	0	1	0	0	0	2	0	x	x	4
Italy (Retornaz) 🔨	0	1	0	2	4	2	0	2	x	x	11

==== Draw 4 ====
Sunday, December 5, 16:00

Sheet F	1	2	3	4	5	6	7	8	9	10	Final
Slovakia (Pitonak)	0	0	0	2	2	0	0	1	0	1	6
Hungary (Riesz) 🔨	0	1	0	0	0	2	0	0	2	0	5

Sheet G	1	2	3	4	5	6	7	8	9	10	Final
England (MacDougall) 🔨	0	0	2	0	0	0	2	0	2	0	6
Belgium (Suter)	2	0	0	1	1	1	0	1	0	1	7

Sheet H	1	2	3	4	5	6	7	8	9	10	Final
Estonia (Lill) 🔨	5	0	2	0	1	2	X	X	X	X	10
Greece (Zacharias)	0	1	0	1	0	0	X	X	X	X	2

Sheet J	1	2	3	4	5	6	7	8	9	10	Final
Spain (Labrador)	0	1	2	0	0	0	X	X	X	X	3
Italy (Retornaz) 🔨	3	0	0	2	4	2	X	X	X	X	11

Sheet K	1	2	3	4	5	6	7	8	9	10	Final
Belarus (Kirillov)	0	0	1	0	0	1	0	1	X	X	3
Austria (Fendt) 🔨	2	3	0	1	2	0	2	0	X	X	10

Sheet L	1	2	3	4	5	6	7	8	9	10	Final
Ireland (Gray)	0	0	1	1	0	0	0	0	0	X	2
Latvia (Gulbis) 🔨	2	0	0	0	0	1	1	1	0	X	5

==== Draw 5 ====
Monday, December 6, 8:00

Sheet F	1	2	3	4	5	6	7	8	9	10	Final
Austria (Fendt)	2	0	1	0	1	0	2	0	1	0	7
Wales (Meikle) 🔨	0	1	0	1	0	1	0	3	0	2	8

Sheet G	1	2	3	4	5	6	7	8	9	10	Final
Finland (Kiiskinen) 🔨	1	0	2	0	2	0	1	0	2	X	8
Belarus (Kirillov)	0	1	0	2	0	1	0	1	0	X	5

Sheet H	1	2	3	4	5	6	7	8	9	10	Final
Croatia (Domazetovic)	0	0	1	1	0	0	0	X	X	X	2
Ireland (Gray) 🔨	3	1	0	0	3	1	3	X	X	X	11

Sheet J	Final
Latvia (Gulbis)	W
Bulgaria (Venilov)	L

Sheet K	1	2	3	4	5	6	7	8	9	10	Final
Estonia (Lill)	0	0	0	1	1	0	0	1	1	X	4
England (MacDougall) 🔨	1	0	0	0	0	0	1	0	0	X	2

Sheet L	1	2	3	4	5	6	7	8	9	10	11	Final
Greece (Zacharias)	0	2	0	2	0	0	1	0	1	2	0	8
Slovakia (Pitonak) 🔨	2	0	1	0	1	2	0	2	0	0	1	9

==== Draw 6 ====
Monday, December 6, 16:00

Sheet F	1	2	3	4	5	6	7	8	9	10	Final
Belgium (Suter) 🔨	1	0	0	2	0	1	0	1	0	2	7
Estonia (Lill)	0	0	1	0	1	0	0	0	3	0	5

Sheet G	1	2	3	4	5	6	7	8	9	10	Final
Italy (Retornaz)	0	2	0	2	0	1	1	1	0	1	8
Slovakia (Pitonak) 🔨	1	0	1	0	3	0	0	0	1	0	6

Sheet H	1	2	3	4	5	6	7	8	9	10	Final
Spain (Labrador)	0	3	1	0	2	1	0	1	0	X	8
Hungary (Riesz) 🔨	2	0	0	2	0	0	0	0	1	X	5

Sheet J	1	2	3	4	5	6	7	8	9	10	Final
England (MacDougall) 🔨	0	1	0	1	1	0	2	0	1	X	6
Greece (Zacharias)	0	0	1	0	0	1	0	0	0	X	2

Sheet K	1	2	3	4	5	6	7	8	9	10	Final
Wales (Meikle)	0	0	0	1	0	2	0	1	X	X	4
Latvia (Gulbis) 🔨	1	2	2	0	2	0	2	0	X	X	9

Sheet L	Final
Bulgaria (Venilov)	L
Belarus (Kirillov)	W

==== Draw 7 ====
Tuesday, December 7, 8:00

Sheet F	1	2	3	4	5	6	7	8	9	10	Final
Greece (Zacharias)	0	0	0	0	0	1	X	X	X	X	1
Italy (Retornaz) 🔨	4	3	2	2	1	0	X	X	X	X	12

Sheet G	1	2	3	4	5	6	7	8	9	10	11	Final
Estonia (Lill)	0	1	2	2	0	0	0	1	1	0	0	7
Spain (Labrador) 🔨	2	0	0	0	2	1	0	0	0	2	1	8

Sheet H	1	2	3	4	5	6	7	8	9	10	Final
England (MacDougall) 🔨	1	0	0	2	0	1	0	0	X	X	4
Slovakia (Pitonak)	0	2	1	0	2	0	2	2	X	X	9

Sheet J	1	2	3	4	5	6	7	8	9	10	Final
Belgium (Suter) 🔨	1	0	2	0	0	0	0	1	0	0	4
Hungary (Riesz)	0	1	0	2	1	0	1	0	1	1	7

Sheet K	1	2	3	4	5	6	7	8	9	10	11	Final
Ireland (Gray)	0	1	0	0	0	1	1	1	0	0	1	5
Finland (Kiiskinen) 🔨	1	0	1	0	1	0	0	0	0	1	0	4

Sheet L	1	2	3	4	5	6	7	8	9	10	Final
Austria (Fendt) 🔨	2	2	1	0	3	2	1	X	X	X	11
Croatia (Domazetovic)	0	0	0	1	0	0	0	X	X	X	1

==== Draw 8 ====
Tuesday, December 7, 16:00

Sheet F	1	2	3	4	5	6	7	8	9	10	Final
Belarus (Kirillov)	1	1	0	0	2	0	1	0	1	X	6
Ireland (Gray) 🔨	0	0	5	2	0	2	0	1	0	X	10

Sheet G	1	2	3	4	5	6	7	8	9	10	Final
Latvia (Gulbis) 🔨	4	2	0	2	1	0	0	2	X	X	11
Austria (Fendt)	0	0	1	0	0	1	1	0	X	X	3

Sheet H	Final
Wales (Meikle)	W
Bulgaria (Venilov)	L

Sheet J	1	2	3	4	5	6	7	8	9	10	Final
Croatia (Domazetovic)	0	0	0	0	2	0	X	X	X	X	2
Finland (Kiiskinen) 🔨	4	2	3	1	0	4	X	X	X	X	14

Sheet K	1	2	3	4	5	6	7	8	9	10	Final
Hungary (Riesz) 🔨	1	0	1	0	2	0	0	1	0	X	5
Italy (Retornaz)	0	2	0	2	0	0	3	0	2	X	9

Sheet L	1	2	3	4	5	6	7	8	9	10	Final
Belgium (Suter) 🔨	0	0	2	0	2	0	0	2	2	X	8
Spain (Labrador)	0	1	0	1	0	1	1	0	0	X	4

==== Draw 9 ====
Wednesday, December 8, 8:00

Sheet F	1	2	3	4	5	6	7	8	9	10	Final
Spain (Labrador)	0	2	0	1	0	1	1	0	0	3	8
Slovakia (Pitonak) 🔨	0	0	2	0	1	0	0	1	1	0	5

Sheet G	1	2	3	4	5	6	7	8	9	10	Final
Belgium (Suter) 🔨	1	0	2	3	0	0	1	0	0	X	7
Greece (Zacharias)	0	2	0	0	0	0	0	3	1	X	6

Sheet H	1	2	3	4	5	6	7	8	9	10	Final
Hungary (Riesz)	0	1	0	0	2	1	0	0	2	0	6
Estonia (Lill) 🔨	2	0	1	1	0	0	2	0	0	4	10

Sheet J	1	2	3	4	5	6	7	8	9	10	Final
Italy (Retornaz) 🔨	1	0	0	1	0	2	0	2	0	1	7
England (MacDougall)	0	0	1	0	1	0	1	0	1	0	4

==== Draw 10 ====
Wednesday, December 8, 16:00

Sheet F	1	2	3	4	5	6	7	8	9	10	Final
Latvia (Gulbis) 🔨	0	3	2	1	3	0	3	X	X	X	12
Croatia (Domazetovic)	1	0	0	0	0	2	0	X	X	X	3

Sheet G	Final
Bulgaria (Venilov)	L
Ireland (Gray)	W

Sheet H	1	2	3	4	5	6	7	8	9	10	Final
Finland (Kiiskinen)	0	2	1	2	0	3	X	X	X	X	8
Austria (Fendt) 🔨	0	0	0	0	0	0	X	X	X	X	0

Sheet J	1	2	3	4	5	6	7	8	9	10	Final
Belarus (Kirillov)	0	1	0	0	0	0	X	X	X	X	1
Wales (Meikle) 🔨	1	0	3	4	3	1	X	X	X	X	12

=== Playoffs ===
Page playoff system
B1-1	Latvia	9
B2-1	Italy	5
B1-2	Ireland	8
B2-2	Slovakia	2

Semifinal
B2-1	Italy	6
B1-2	Ireland	5

Gold-medal game
B1-1	Latvia	7
B2-1	Italy	10

Bronze-medal game
B1-2	Ireland	9
B2-2	Slovakia	2

==== Page 1 vs. 1 ====
Thursday, December 9, 18:30

Sheet J	1	2	3	4	5	6	7	8	9	10	Final
Italy (Retornaz) 🔨	2	0	2	0	1	0	0	0	0	X	5
Latvia (Gulbis)	0	2	0	2	0	1	3	0	1	X	9

==== Page 2 vs. 2 ====
Thursday, December 9, 18:30

Sheet G	1	2	3	4	5	6	7	8	9	10	Final
Ireland (Gray) 🔨	0	0	1	3	0	2	0	2	X	X	8
Slovakia (Pitonak)	0	1	0	0	1	0	0	0	X	X	2

==== Semifinal ====
Friday, December 10, 8:00

Team	1	2	3	4	5	6	7	8	9	10	11	Final
Ireland (Gray)	0	1	0	1	0	0	0	2	1	0	0	5
Italy (Retornaz) 🔨	1	0	1	0	0	1	1	0	0	1	1	6

==== Bronze-medal game ====
Saturday, December 11, 9:30

Sheet K	1	2	3	4	5	6	7	8	9	10	Final
Ireland (Gray)	1	3	1	1	1	0	0	2	X	X	9
Slovakia (Pitonak)	0	0	0	0	0	1	1	0	X	X	2

==== Gold-medal game ====
Friday, December 10, 13:00

Sheet K	1	2	3	4	5	6	7	8	9	10	11	Final
Latvia (Gulbis) 🔨	2	2	0	2	0	1	0	0	0	0	0	7
Italy (Retornaz)	0	0	1	0	1	0	1	1	2	1	3	10

== Group C ==
=== Teams ===
Belarus	Iceland	Lithuania	Luxembourg
Fourth: Ilya Kazlouski Third: Dzmitry Yarko; Second: Pavel Petrov; Skip: Dmitry Kirillov	Fourth: Sveinn H. Steingrimsson Third: Saevar Örn Sveinbjörnsson; Second: Haraldur Ingolfsson; Skip: Jens Kristinn Gislason	Skip: Tadas Vysukupaitis Third: Vidas Sadauskas; Second: Vytis Kulakauskas; Lead: Laurynas Telksnys; Alternate: Vygantas Zalieckas	Fourth: Jörg Moeser Skip: Marco Etienne; Second: Alex Benoy; Lead: Sigurd Wallstroem
Serbia	Slovakia	Turkey	
Skip: Marko Stojanovic Third: Bojan Mijatovic; Second: Goran Ungurovic; Lead: Djordje Neskovic	Skip: Pavol Pitonak Third: Frantisek Pitonak; Second: Tomas Pitonak; Lead: Peter Pitonak	Skip: İlhan Osmanağaoğlu Third: Tuğrul Şinasi Şahiner; Second: Ali Osman Şahin; Lead: Murat Sağır; Alternate: Gökçe Ulugay	

=== Standings ===
Key
To Group C Final

Nation	Skip	Win	Loss
Belarus	Dmitry Kirillov	5	1
Slovakia	Pavol Pitonak	5	1
Iceland	Jens Kristinn Gislason	4	2
Lithuania	Tadas Vysukupaitis	3	3
Serbia	Marko Stojanovic	2	4
Luxembourg	Marco Etienne	1	5
Turkey	Ihlan Osmanagaoglu	1	5

=== Results ===
==== Round 1 ====
Friday, 24 September, 21:00

Sheet D	1	2	3	4	5	6	7	8	9	10	Final
Iceland (Gislason)	5	0	2	0	4	1	X	X	X	X	12
Luxembourg (Etienne)	0	1	0	1	0	0	X	X	X	X	2

Sheet E	1	2	3	4	5	6	7	8	9	10	Final
Slovakia (Pitonak)	1	2	2	0	1	0	1	1	X	X	8
Serbia (Stojanovic)	0	0	0	1	0	1	0	0	X	X	2

Sheet F	1	2	3	4	5	6	7	8	9	10	Final
Lithuania (Vysukupaitis)	1	0	3	0	1	0	0	1	1	0	7
Belarus (Kirillov)	0	2	0	1	0	2	2	0	0	1	8

Turkey receives bye this round.

==== Round 2 ====
Saturday, 25 September, 12:00

Sheet A	1	2	3	4	5	6	7	8	9	10	Final
Serbia (Stojanovic)	0	1	0	2	0	0	1	0	2	2	8
Turkey (Osmanagaoglu)	1	0	1	0	1	1	0	2	0	0	6

Sheet B	1	2	3	4	5	6	7	8	9	10	Final
Belarus (Kirillov)	0	1	1	0	2	0	2	0	1	1	8
Luxembourg (Etienne)	1	0	0	1	0	1	0	1	0	0	4

Sheet F	1	2	3	4	5	6	7	8	9	10	Final
Iceland (Gislason)	0	1	0	0	1	0	0	2	2	0	6
Slovakia (Pitonak)	1	0	0	1	0	1	1	0	0	1	5

Lithuania receives bye this round.

==== Round 3 ====
Saturday, 25 September, 19:00

Sheet C	1	2	3	4	5	6	7	8	9	10	Final
Belarus (Kirillov)	0	0	0	0	0	1	X	X	X	X	1
Slovakia (Pitonak)	3	2	1	3	2	0	X	X	X	X	11

Sheet E	1	2	3	4	5	6	7	8	9	10	Final
Turkey (Osmanagaoglu)	1	0	1	0	0	0	2	1	1	1	7
Iceland (Gislason)	0	1	0	3	3	1	0	0	0	0	8

Sheet F	1	2	3	4	5	6	7	8	9	10	Final
Luxembourg (Etienne)	1	0	0	0	0	0	0	2	1	1	5
Lithuania (Vysukupaitis)	0	1	1	1	1	0	2	0	0	0	6

Serbia receives bye this round.

==== Round 4 ====
Sunday, 26 September, 10:00

Sheet A	1	2	3	4	5	6	7	8	9	10	Final
Slovakia (Pitonak)	0	0	2	1	0	1	1	1	0	X	6
Lithuania (Vysukupaitis)	1	1	0	0	1	0	0	0	2	X	5

Sheet C	1	2	3	4	5	6	7	8	9	10	Final
Serbia (Stojanovic)	1	1	0	0	0	1	0	2	0	X	5
Iceland (Gislason)	0	0	2	1	1	0	2	0	2	X	8

Sheet D	1	2	3	4	5	6	7	8	9	10	11	Final
Turkey (Osmanagaoglu)	0	0	1	0	4	0	1	0	2	1	0	9
Belarus (Kirillov)	4	1	0	1	0	1	0	2	0	0	1	10

Luxembourg receives bye this round.

==== Round 5 ====
Sunday, 26 September, 15:00

Sheet A	1	2	3	4	5	6	7	8	9	10	Final
Belarus (Kirillov)	5	0	1	1	0	0	0	1	0	2	10
Iceland (Gislason)	0	3	0	0	1	2	1	0	2	0	9

Sheet B	1	2	3	4	5	6	7	8	9	10	Final
Luxembourg (Etienne)	0	1	0	0	1	0	X	X	X	X	2
Turkey (Osmanagaoglu)	2	0	2	3	0	4	X	X	X	X	11

Sheet D	1	2	3	4	5	6	7	8	9	10	Final
Lithuania (Vysukupaitis)	1	0	0	1	0	0	2	3	0	0	7
Serbia (Stojanovic)	0	3	1	0	1	1	0	0	2	1	9

Slovakia receives bye this round.

==== Round 6 ====
Monday, 27 September, 18:00

Sheet B	1	2	3	4	5	6	7	8	9	10	11	Final
Serbia (Stojanovic)	0	1	2	1	0	1	0	1	1	0	0	7
Belarus (Kirillov)	1	0	0	0	1	0	2	0	0	3	1	8

Sheet C	1	2	3	4	5	6	7	8	9	10	Final
Slovakia (Pitonak)	1	1	0	3	0	1	0	3	X	X	9
Luxembourg (Etienne)	0	0	1	0	1	0	1	0	X	X	3

Sheet E	1	2	3	4	5	6	7	8	9	10	Final
Lithuania (Vysukupaitis)	0	0	1	1	0	3	1	3	2	X	11
Turkey (Osmanagaoglu)	2	1	0	0	2	0	0	0	0	X	5

Iceland receives bye this round.

==== Round 7 ====
Monday, 27 September, 18:00

Sheet A	1	2	3	4	5	6	7	8	9	10	Final
Luxembourg (Etienne)	0	2	0	0	0	2	2	1	1	X	8
Serbia (Stojanovic)	2	0	1	1	1	0	0	0	0	X	5

Sheet B	1	2	3	4	5	6	7	8	9	10	Final
Turkey (Osmanagaoglu)	1	0	0	0	0	2	0	1	1	0	5
Slovakia (Pitonak)	0	0	0	4	0	0	0	0	0	3	7

Sheet C	1	2	3	4	5	6	7	8	9	10	Final
Iceland (Gislason)	1	0	1	0	2	0	3	0	0	0	7
Lithuania (Vysukupaitis)	0	2	0	1	0	2	0	0	1	2	8

Belarus receives bye this round.

==== Final ====
Tuesday, 28 September, 18:00

Sheet E	1	2	3	4	5	6	7	8	9	10	Final
Slovakia (Pitonak)	1	1	1	2	0	2	1	2	X	X	10
Belarus (Kirillov)	0	0	0	0	1	0	0	0	X	X	1

Slovakia and Belarus advance to the Group B competition in Monthey.
