= John Hunt (curler) =

Welsh male curler

- Curler

Team
- Curling club: Deeside CC

Curling career
- Member Association: Wales
- World Championship: 1 (1995)
- European Championship: 14 (1980, 1983, 1984, 1985, 1986, 1987, 1988, 1990, 1993, 1994, 1995, 1996, 1997, 1998)
Medal record
Curling

John Hunt is a Welsh curler. He was a longtime skip of the Welsh national men's curling team in the 1980s and 1990s.

== Teams ==
Season	Skip	Third	Second	Lead	Alternate	Events
1980–81	Keith Preston (fourth)	Gordon Vickers	Peter Williams	John Hunt (skip)		ECC 1980 (11th)
1983–84	John Hunt	John Stone	Peter Williams	Ray King		ECC 1983 (11th)
1984–85	John Hunt	John Stone	Scott Lyon	Ray King		ECC 1984 (13th)
1985–86	John Hunt	John Stone	John Guyan	Scott Lyon		ECC 1985 (13th)
1986–87	John Stone	John Guyan	Michael Hunt	John Hunt		ECC 1986 (12th)
1987–88	John Hunt	John Stone	John Guyan	Michael Hunt		ECC 1987 (13th)
1988–89	John Hunt	John Stone	John Guyan	Michael Hunt		ECC 1988 (13th)
1990–91	John Hunt	John Stone	Scott Lyon	David Stevenson		ECC 1990 (8th)
1993–94	Adrian Meikle	John Hunt	David Stevenson	Nick Leslie		ECC 1993 (11th)
1994–95	Adrian Meikle (fourth)	John Hunt (skip)	Jamie Meikle	Hugh Meikle		ECC 1994 (7th)
1994–95	Jamie Meikle (fourth)	Adrian Meikle	John Hunt (skip)	Hugh Meikle	Chris Wells	WCC 1995 (10th)
1995–96	Adrian Meikle	Jamie Meikle	John Hunt	Hugh Meikle	Chris Wells	ECC 1995 (13th)
1996–97	John Hunt	Chris Wells	Gordon Vickers	Patrick Stone		ECC 1996 (15th)
1997–98	Adrian Meikle (fourth)	Jamie Meikle	John Hunt (skip)	Hugh Meikle	Chris Wells	ECC 1997 (8th)
1998–99	John Hunt	Chris Wells	Peter Williams	Patrick Stone	Christopher Baker	ECC 1998 (12th)
