= Jeroen van Dillewijn =

Dutch curler

- Curler ♂

Team
- Curling club: CC PWA, Zoetermeer

Curling career
- Member Association: Netherlands
- World Championship: 1 (1994)
- European Championship: 2 (1993, 1994)
Medal record
Curling

Jeroen van Dillewijn is a Dutch curler.

== Teams ==
Season	Skip	Third	Second	Lead	Alternate	Events
1993–94	Wim Neeleman	Floris van Imhoff	Rob Vilain	Jeroen van Dillewijn	Erik A van der Zwan	ECC 1993 (8th)
1993–94	Wim Neeleman	Floris van Imhoff	Rob Vilain	Jeroen van Dillewijn	Gustaf van Imhoff	WCC 1994 (7th)
1994–95	Wim Neeleman	Floris van Imhoff	Rob Vilain	Erik A van der Zwan	Jeroen van Dillewijn	ECC 1994 (8th)
