= Reinier Butôt =

Dutch curler

Reinier Butôt is a former Dutch curler from the Curling Club Utrecht. He was the lead of the Dutch national team. In 2001, 2002 and 2003 he played third for Mark Neeleman at the World Junior "B" Curling Championships. All three years they finished 7th. Butôt was also an alternate on two European Championships teams: 12th place for Reg Wiebe in 2002 and 13th place for Floris van Imhoff in 2003. At the 2004 European Championships, Butôt played lead for Erik van der Zwan and they finished 15th. At the 2005 European Championships, he played second for Reg Wiebe's 19th place team.

http://www.curlingclubutrecht.nl
