= Van der Cammen =

van der Cammen is a Dutch surname. Notable people with the surname include:

- Ellen van der Cammen (born 1977), Dutch curler
- Steven van der Cammen (born 1980), Dutch curler, brother of Ellen
