= Reg Wiebe =

Dutch curler

- Curler ♂
- Born: 23 January 1963
- Died: 20 December 2018 (aged 55); Winnipeg

Team
- Curling club: CC Utrecht, Utrecht

Curling career
- Member Association: Netherlands
- European Championship: 8 (1999, 2001, 2002, 2003, 2004, 2005, 2006, 2007)
Medal record
Curling

Reg Wiebe (born January 23, 1963, Canada - died December 20, 2018, Winnipeg) was a Dutch Canadian-born curler and curling coach from the Curling Club Utrecht. In a middle of 2000s he was a skip of the Dutch national team. Wiebe has played in six European Curling Championships, including a 10th-place finish in the 1999 Championships as a third for Wim Neeleman. Wiebe has skipped the Dutch team to three European championships. In 2002 they finished 12th, in 2005 they finished 19th, and in 2007 they finished 17th.

== Teams ==
Season	Skip	Third	Second	Lead	Alternate	Coach	Events
1999–00	Wim Neeleman	Reg Wiebe	Robert van der Cammen	Willem Pronk	Jan Willem Kooistra	Armin Harder	ECC 1999 (10th)
2001–02	Rob Vilain	Reg Wiebe	Willem Pronk	Walter Verbueken	Steve van der Cammen	Jaap Veerman	ECC 2001 (16th)
2002–03	Reg Wiebe	Floris van Imhoff	Erik A van der Zwan	Steve van der Cammen	Reinier Butöt	Jaap Veerman	ECC 2002 (12th)
2003–04	Floris van Imhoff	Erik A van der Zwan	Reg Wiebe	Steve van der Cammen	Reinier Butöt	Jaap Veerman	ECC 2003 (13th)
2004–05	Erik A van der Zwan	Reg Wiebe	Steve van der Cammen	Reinier Butöt	Jaap Veerman	Jaap Veerman	ECC 2004 (15th)
2005–06	Reg Wiebe	Steve van der Cammen	Reinier Butöt	Christiaan Offringa	Mark Rurup	Greg Dunn	ECC 2005 (19th)
2006–07	Steve van der Cammen	Reg Wiebe	Mark Neeleman	Christiaan Offringa	Greg Dunn		ECC 2006 (17th)
2007–08	Reg Wiebe	Steve van der Cammen	Mark Neeleman	Mark Rurup	Rob Vilain	Bill Charlebois	ECC 2007 (17th)
2014–15	Reg Wiebe	Andrew Grant	Scott Moon	Thomas Kooi			

== Record as a coach of national teams ==
Year	Tournament, event	National team	Place
2016	2016 World Mixed Doubles Curling Championship	Netherlands (mixed doubles)	37
