= Christiaan Offringa =

Dutch curler

Christiaan Offringa is a Dutch curler from the Curling Club Utrecht. He played lead for the Dutch Junior team at the 2001 and 2003 "B" World Junior Championships, finishing 7th both times on a team skipped by Mark Neeleman. Offringa made his European Curling Championships debut in 2005 when he played lead for Reg Wiebe's 19th place team. He returned to the European Championships in 2006, remaining at lead while Wiebe and Steve van der Cammen swapped at third and skip. They improved slightly, finishing in 17th place.
