= Jamie Meikle =

Welsh male curler

- Curler
- Born: c. 1967; Toronto, Ontario, Canada

Team
- Curling club: Deeside CC

Curling career
- Member Association: Wales
- World Championship: 1 (1995)
- European Championship: 9 (1989, 1994, 1995, 1997, 2004, 2005, 2006, 2007, 2008)
Medal record
Curling

Jamie Meikle (born c. 1967) is a Canadian-born Welsh curler.

== Teams ==
Season	Skip	Third	Second	Lead	Alternate	Coach	Events
1989–90	Adrian Meikle	Jamie Meikle	Hugh Meikle	Nick Leslie			ECC 1989 (8th)
1994–95	Adrian Meikle (fourth)	John Hunt (skip)	Jamie Meikle	Hugh Meikle			ECC 1994 (7th)
1994–95	Jamie Meikle (fourth)	Adrian Meikle	John Hunt (skip)	Hugh Meikle	Chris Wells		WCC 1995 (10th)
1995–96	Adrian Meikle	Jamie Meikle	John Hunt	Hugh Meikle	Chris Wells		ECC 1995 (13th)
1997–98	Adrian Meikle (fourth)	Jamie Meikle	John Hunt (skip)	Hugh Meikle	Chris Wells		ECC 1997 (8th)
2004–05	Adrian Meikle	Jamie Meikle	John Sharpe	Andrew Tanner	Chris Wells		ECC 2004 (9th)
2005–06	Adrian Meikle	Jamie Meikle	Stuart Hills	Andrew Tanner	Hugh Meikle	Elizabeth Meikle	ECC 2005 (12th)
2005–06	Adrian Meikle	Jamie Meikle	Andrew Tanner	Kjell-Arne Olsson			
2006–07	Adrian Meikle	Jamie Meikle	Stuart Hills	Andrew Tanner	Colin Morrison		ECC 2006 (10th)
2007–08	Jamie Meikle	Stuart Hills	Andrew Tanner	James Pougher	Adrian Meikle	Hugh Meikle	ECC 2007 (17th)
2008–09	Jamie Meikle	Stuart Hills	Andrew Tanner	James Pougher	Richard Pougher	Alison Pougher	ECC 2008 (16th)

== Personal life ==
Jamie Meikle is from family of curlers: his father Hugh was a curler and coach, founder of Welsh Curling Association; his mother Elizabeth is also a curler and coach; his older brother Adrian is Jamie's longtime teammate and skip.
