= Espen de Lange =

Norwegian curler and coach (born 1968)

- Curler ♂

Team
- Curling club: Snarøen CC, Bærum

Curling career
- Member Association: Norway
- European Championship: 2 (1989, 1993)
- Other appearances: World Senior Curling Championships: 2 (2017, 2024)
Medal record
Curling
European Championships
Gold medal – first place	1993 Leukerbad
Silver medal – second place	1989 Engelberg

Espen de Lange (born March 22, 1968) is a Norwegian curler and curling coach.

He is a 1993 European champion.

== Teams ==
Season	Skip	Third	Second	Lead	Alternate	Coach	Events
1989–90	Eigil Ramsfjell	Dagfinn Loen	Espen de Lange	Thoralf Hognestad	Bent Ånund Ramsfjell		ECC 1989 (silver)
1993–94	Eigil Ramsfjell	Sjur Loen	Dagfinn Loen	Niclas Järund	Espen de Lange	Thoralf Hognestad	ECC 1993 (gold)
2017	Flemming Davanger	Espen de Lange	Morten Tveit	Robert Wood		Thomas Løvold	WSCC 2017 (12th)

== Record as a coach of national teams ==
Year	Tournament, event	National team	Place
2019	2019 World Senior Curling Championships	Norway (senior men)	5
