= Mark Rurup =

Dutch curler

Mark Rurup (born 22 July 1975, Zaanstad) is a Dutch curler from Amsterdam who curls out of the Curling Club Utrecht. He is the third of the Praxis Hammerheads which is the Dutch national team. Rurup has played in 3 European Championships. In 2005 he was the alternate for Reg Wiebe, and finished 19th. In 2007, he was the team's lead, and finished 17th. In 2009, he finished 11th, playing third for Mark Neeleman.
