= Thoralf Hognestad =

Norwegian male curler and coach

- Curler ♂
- Born: 2 October 1962 (age 64); Stavanger

Team
- Curling club: Snarøen CC, Bærum

Curling career
- Member Association: Norway
- European Championship: 1 (1989)
Medal record
Curling
European Championships
Silver medal – second place	1989 Engelberg

Thoralf Nettelhorst Hognestad (born 2 October 1962 in Stavanger) is a former Norwegian curler and curling coach.

He is a 1989 European silver medallist.

He works also as a sports TV-commentator for Eurosport and other TV-broadcasters.

== Teams ==
Season	Skip	Third	Second	Lead	Alternate	Events
1989–90	Eigil Ramsfjell	Dagfinn Loen	Espen de Lange	Thoralf Hognestad	Bent Ånund Ramsfjell	ECC 1989 (silver)

== Record as a coach of national teams ==
Year	Tournament, event	National team	Place
1992	1992 World Junior Curling Championships	Norway (junior women)	6
1993	1993 World Junior Curling Championships	Norway (junior women)	6
1993	1993 European Curling Championships	Norway (men)	1st place, gold medalist(s)
1994	1994 World Junior Curling Championships	Norway (junior women)	5
2007	2007 World Wheelchair Curling Championship	Norway (wheelchair)	1st place, gold medalist(s)
2008	2008 World Wheelchair Curling Championship	Norway (wheelchair)	1st place, gold medalist(s)
2009	2009 World Wheelchair Curling Championship	Norway (wheelchair)	7
2011	2011 World Wheelchair Curling Championship	Norway (wheelchair)	3rd place, bronze medalist(s)
2012	2012 World Wheelchair Curling Championship	Norway (wheelchair)	9
