= Ellen van der Cammen =

Dutch curler

Elisabeth Anna Maria "Ellen" van der Cammen (born 8 September 1977, Rotterdam) is a Dutch curler from the Curling Club Utrecht. In 2001, she was an alternate for the team, skipped by Margrietha Voskuilen that finished 13th at the European Curling Championships. In 2002, she was the team's second in a 16th-place finish at the European championships. In 2004, as a third for Shari Leibbrandt-Demmon, the Dutch finished in 12th place. In 2005, they finished in 7th place. After the 2006 World Championships in Grande Prairie, AB, Canada, where the team ended 12th, she left the team in order to have more time for her personal life. She now works as a children's physiotherapist in Krimpen a/d IJssel, Netherlands.

Her younger brother Steven is also a curler.
