= Wim Neeleman =

Dutch curler and coach

- Curler ♂

Team
- Curling club: CC PWA, Zoetermeer

Curling career
- Member Association: Netherlands
- World Championship: 1 (1994)
- European Championship: 16 (1979, 1980, 1982, 1983, 1984, 1985, 1986, 1987, 1988, 1991, 1992, 1993, 1994, 1995, 1996, 1999)
- Other appearances: European Mixed Championship: 2 (2011, 2012), World Senior Championships: 3 (2011, 2012, 2013)
Medal record
Curling

Wim Neeleman is a Dutch curler and curling coach.

== Teams ==
=== Men's ===
| Season | Skip | Third | Second | Lead | Alternate | Coach | Events |
|---|---|---|---|---|---|---|---|
| 1979–80 | Eric Harmsen | Robert Harmsen | Otto Veening | Wim Neeleman | | | ECC 1979 (10th) |
| 1980–81 | Otto Veening | Robert van der Cammen | Jeroen Tilman | Wim Neeleman | | | ECC 1980 (9th) |
| 1982–83 | Wim Neeleman | Robert van der Cammen | Gustaf van Imhoff | Jeroen Tilman | | | ECC 1982 (6th) |
| 1983–84 | Wim Neeleman | Robert van der Cammen | Gustaf van Imhoff | Jeroen Tilman | | | ECC 1983 (7th) |
| 1984–85 | Wim Neeleman | Robert van der Cammen | Gérard Verbeek | Jeroen Tilman | | | ECC 1984 (10th) |
| 1985–86 | Wim Neeleman | Otto Veening | Gérard Verbeek | Jeroen Tilman | | Darrell Ell | ECC 1985 (8th) |
| 1986–87 | Wim Neeleman | Jeroen Tilman | Otto Veening | Floris van Imhoff | | | ECC 1986 (13th) |
| 1987–88 | Wim Neeleman | Otto Veening | Sytze van Dam | Cock Sonneveld | | | ECC 1987 (8th) |
| 1988–89 | Robert van der Cammen | Wim Neeleman | Rob Joosen | Fred Melker | | | ECC 1988 (11th) |
| 1991–92 | Wim Neeleman | Gustaf van Imhoff | Floris van Imhoff | Rob Vilain | | | ECC 1991 (12th) |
| 1992–93 | Wim Neeleman | Gustaf van Imhoff | Andreas van Imhoff | Rob Vilain | | Darrell Ell | ECC 1992 (10th) |
| 1993–94 | Wim Neeleman | Floris van Imhoff | Rob Vilain | Jeroen van Dillewijn | Erik A van der Zwan | | ECC 1993 (8th) |
| 1993–94 | Wim Neeleman | Floris van Imhoff | Rob Vilain | Jeroen van Dillewijn | Gustaf van Imhoff | | WCC 1994 (7th) |
| 1994–95 | Wim Neeleman | Floris van Imhoff | Rob Vilain | Erik A van der Zwan | Jeroen van Dillewijn | | ECC 1994 (8th) |
| 1995–96 | Wim Neeleman | Floris van Imhoff | Rob Vilain | Erik A van der Zwan | Gustaf van Imhoff | Armin Harder | ECC 1995 (13th) |
| 1996–97 | Floris van Imhoff | Gustaf van Imhoff | Rob Vilain | Erik A van der Zwan | Wim Neeleman | Armin Harder | ECC 1996 (12th) |
| 1999–00 | Wim Neeleman | Reg Wiebe | Robert van der Cammen | Willem Pronk | Jan Willem Kooistra | Armin Harder | ECC 1999 (10th) |
| 2010–11 | Wim Neeleman | Frank Kerkvliet | Jos Wilmot | Bas Bennis | | Mark Neeleman | WSCC 2011 (20th) |
| 2011–12 | Wim Neeleman | Frank Kerkvliet | Jos Wilmot | Bas Bennis | | Mark Neeleman | WSCC 2012 (16th) |
| 2012–13 | Wim Neeleman | Frank Kerkvliet | Jos Wilmot | Bas Bennis | | Mark Neeleman | WSCC 2013 (15th) |

=== Mixed ===
| Season | Skip | Third | Second | Lead | Events |
|---|---|---|---|---|---|
| 2011–12 | Mark Neeleman | Marianne Neeleman | Wim Neeleman | Els Neeleman | EMxCC 2011 (9th) |
| 2012–13 | Mark Neeleman | Marianne Neeleman | Wim Neeleman | Els Neeleman | EMxCC 2012 (17th) |

== Record as a coach of national teams ==
| Year | Tournament, event | National team | Place |
|---|---|---|---|
| 2010 | 2010 European Junior Curling Challenge | Belgium (junior men) | 11 |
| 2014 | 2014 World Mixed Doubles Curling Championship | Netherlands (mixed doubles) | 25 |
| 2014 | 2014 European Curling Championships (C Group) | Netherlands (women) | 1st place, gold medalist(s) |
| 2019 | 2019 European Curling Championships (C Group) | Belgium (men) | 6 |
