= Marlijn Müller =

Dutch curler

Marlijn Müller (born 4 October 1981 in Breda) is a Dutch curler who was part of the Dutch national team skipped by Shari Leibbrandt-Demmon, which participates in the A Group at the 2006 European Curling Championships. She decided to leave the team in 2007, and she now coaches the Dutch men's team. In the Dutch competition she plays at Curling Club Prins Willem Alexander. Müller also played in the 2007 European Mixed Curling Championship in Madrid.

== See also ==
- European Curling Championships
- 2006 European Curling Championships
- 2007 European Mixed Curling Championship
