= Gustaf van Imhoff =

Dutch curler

- Curler ♂

Team
- Curling club: CC PWA, Zoetermeer

Curling career
- Member Association: Netherlands
- World Championship: 1 (1994)
- European Championship: 8 (1981, 1982, 1983, 1991, 1992, 1995, 1996, 1997)
- Other appearances: World Senior Championships: 2 (2014, 2016)
Medal record
Curling

Gustaf van Imhoff (also known as Gus van Imhoff) is a Dutch curler.

== Teams ==
Season	Skip	Third	Second	Lead	Alternate	Coach	Events
1981–82	Otto Veening	Robin Claushuis	Gustaf van Imhoff	Sytze van Dam			ECC 1981 (13th)
1982–83	Wim Neeleman	Robert van der Cammen	Gustaf van Imhoff	Jeroen Tilman			ECC 1982 (6th)
1983–84	Wim Neeleman	Robert van der Cammen	Gustaf van Imhoff	Jeroen Tilman			ECC 1983 (7th)
1991–92	Wim Neeleman	Gustaf van Imhoff	Floris van Imhoff	Rob Vilain			ECC 1991 (12th)
1992–93	Wim Neeleman	Gustaf van Imhoff	Andreas van Imhoff	Rob Vilain		Darrell Ell	ECC 1992 (10th)
1993–94	Wim Neeleman	Floris van Imhoff	Rob Vilain	Jeroen van Dillewijn	Gustaf van Imhoff		WCC 1994 (7th)
1995–96	Wim Neeleman	Floris van Imhoff	Rob Vilain	Erik A van der Zwan	Gustaf van Imhoff	Armin Harder	ECC 1995 (13th)
1996–97	Floris van Imhoff	Gustaf van Imhoff	Rob Vilain	Erik A van der Zwan	Wim Neeleman	Armin Harder	ECC 1996 (12th)
1997–98	Floris van Imhoff	Rob Vilain	Gustaf van Imhoff	Jaap Veerman	Erik A van der Zwan	Armin Harder	ECC 1997 (12th)
2013–14	Gustaf van Imhoff	Frank Kerkvliet	Jos Wilmot	Bas Bennis		Thomas Kooi	WSCC 2014 (9th)
2015–16	Gustaf van Imhoff	Frank Kerkvliet	Jos Wilmot	Bas Bennis	Willem van Wieringen		WSCC 2016 (22nd)
