= Chris Wells (curler) =

Welsh curler and coach

- Curler ♂

Team
- Curling club: Deeside CC

Curling career
- Member Association: Wales
- World Championship: 1 (1995)
- European Championship: 12 (1981, 1992, 1995, 1996, 1997, 1998, 2000, 2001, 2002, 2003, 2004, 2011)
- Other appearances: World Senior Championships: 9 (2003, 2004, 2006, 2008, 2011, 2012, 2014, 2016, 2017), European Mixed Championship: 2 (2007, 2008)
Medal record
Curling
European Mixed Championship
Gold medal – first place	Madrid 2007

Chris Wells is a Welsh curler and curling coach.

At the international level, he is a 2007 European mixed champion curler.

He started curling in 1972.

== Teams ==
=== Men's ===
Season	Skip	Third	Second	Lead	Alternate	Coach	Events
1981–82	Richard Davis	David Humphreys	Chris Wells	Ray King			ECC 1981 (12th)
1992–93	Peter Williams	Dannie Brent Stetski	Alun Eryl Jones	Graham C. MacMillan	Chris Wells		ECC 1992 (10th)
1994–95	Jamie Meikle (fourth)	Adrian Meikle	John Hunt (skip)	Hugh Meikle	Chris Wells		WCC 1995 (10th)
1995–96	Adrian Meikle	Jamie Meikle	John Hunt	Hugh Meikle	Chris Wells		ECC 1995 (13th)
1996–97	John Hunt	Chris Wells	Gordon Vickers	Patrick Stone			ECC 1996 (15th)
1997–98	Adrian Meikle (fourth)	Jamie Meikle	John Hunt (skip)	Hugh Meikle	Chris Wells		ECC 1997 (8th)
1998–99	John Hunt	Chris Wells	Peter Williams	Patrick Stone	Christopher Baker		ECC 1998 (12th)
2000–01	Adrian Meikle	Chris Wells	John Sharpe	Hugh Meikle	Andrew Tanner		ECC 2000 (16th)
2001–02	Adrian Meikle	Chris Wells	Andrew Tanner	John Sharpe	Hugh Meikle	Dave Pritchard	ECC 2001 (14th)
2002–03	Hugh Meikle	Peter Harris	Ray King	Chris Wells			WSCC 2003 (11th)
2003–04	Hugh Meikle	Chris Wells	Peter Williams	Ray King	Scott Lyon		WSCC 2004 (13th)
2004–05	Adrian Meikle	Jamie Meikle	John Sharpe	Andrew Tanner	Chris Wells		ECC 2004 (9th)
2005–06	Hugh Meikle (fourth)	Chris Wells (skip)	Michael Yuille	Hugh Hodge			WSCC 2006 (12th)
2007–08	Hugh Meikle	Michael Yuille	Stewart Cairns	Hugh Hodge	Chris Wells		WSCC 2008 (11th)
2010–11	Hugh Meikle (fourth)	Chris Wells (skip)	Michael Yuille	Stewart Cairns	Andrew Carr	Elizabeth Meikle	WSCC 2011 (15th)
2011–12	Stuart Hills	Andrew Tanner	James Pougher	Richard Pougher	Chris Wells	Alison Pougher	ECC 2011 (21st)
2011–12	Chris Wells	Hugh Meikle	Stewart Cairns	Andrew Carr	Peter Sims	Gill Sims	WSCC 2012 (19th)
2013–14	Chris Wells	Hugh Meikle	Richard Pougher	Andrew Carr	Gary Waddell		WSCC 2014 (14th)
2015–16	Adrian Meikle	Richard Pougher	Chris Wells	Gary Waddell	Alistair Reid	Dawn Watson	WSCC 2016 (16th)
2016–17	Adrian Meikle	Richard Pougher	Chris Wells	Gary Waddell	Alistair Reid	Dawn Watson	WSCC 2017 (5th)

=== Mixed ===
Season	Skip	Third	Second	Lead	Alternate	Events
2007–08	Adrian Meikle	Lesley Carol	Andrew Tanner	Blair Hughes	Chris Wells	EMxCC 2007 (gold)
2008–09	Adrian Meikle	Lesley Carol	Andrew Tanner	Irene Murray	Chris Wells	EMxCC 2008 (18th)

== Record as a coach of national teams ==
Year	Tournament, event	National team	Place
2009	2009 European Curling Championships	Wales (women)	17
2016	2016 World Mixed Doubles Curling Championship	Wales (mixed double)	36

== Personal life ==
As of 1995, Wells was employed as a physician.
