= Dagfinn Loen =

Norwegian curler

- Curler ♂

Team
- Curling club: Brumunddal CC, Brumunddal, Snarøen CC, Bærum

Curling career
- Member Association: Norway
- World Championship: 4 (1981, 1982, 1985, 1991)
- European Championship: 7 (1977, 1980, 1983, 1984, 1988, 1989, 1993)
- Other appearances: World Senior Curling Championships: 1 (2012)
Medal record
Curling
World Championships
Bronze medal – third place	1991 Winnipeg
European Championships
Gold medal – first place	1993 Leukerbad
Silver medal – second place	1980 Copenhagen
Silver medal – second place	1983 Västerås
Silver medal – second place	1988 Perth
Silver medal – second place	1989 Engelberg
Bronze medal – third place	1984 Morzine

Dagfinn Loen is a former Norwegian curler.

He is a 1993 European champion.

Following retirement he became the vice-president of the Norwegian Curling Association.(Norwegian: Norges curlingforbund).

== Teams ==
Season	Skip	Third	Second	Lead	Alternate	Coach	Events
1974–75	Morten Sørum	Bjørn Skutbergaveen	Hans Bekkelund	Dagfinn Loen			WJCC 1975 (4th)
1977–78	Sjur Loen	Morten Søgård	Dagfinn Loen	Roar Rise			ECC 1977 (5th)
1980–81	Kristian Sørum	Eigil Ramsfjell	Gunnar Meland	Dagfinn Loen			ECC 1980 (silver); WCC 1981 (4th)
1981–82	Sjur Loen	Morten Søgård	Morten Skaug	Dagfinn Loen		Kristian Sørum	WCC 1982 (5th)
1983–84	Kristian Sørum	Morten Søgård	Dagfinn Loen	Morten Skaug			ECC 1983 (silver)
1984–85	Kristian Sørum	Morten Søgård	Dagfinn Loen	Morten Skaug			ECC 1984 (bronze)
1984–85	Kristian Sørum	Morten Søgård	Morten Skaug	Dagfinn Loen		Bo Bakke	WCC 1985 (6th)
1988–89	Eigil Ramsfjell	Sjur Loen	Morten Søgård	Dagfinn Loen			ECC 1988 (silver)
1989–90	Eigil Ramsfjell	Dagfinn Loen	Espen de Lange	Thoralf Hognestad	Bent Ånund Ramsfjell		ECC 1989 (silver)
1990–91	Eigil Ramsfjell	Sjur Loen	Niclas Järund	Morten Skaug	Dagfinn Loen		WCC 1991 (bronze)
1993–94	Eigil Ramsfjell	Sjur Loen	Dagfinn Loen	Niclas Järund	Espen de Lange	Thoralf Hognestad	ECC 1993 (gold)
2011–12	Eigil Ramsfjell	Sjur Loen	Morten Søgård	Dagfinn Loen	Stein Mellemseter		WSCC 2012 (4th)
