= Hugh Meikle =

Welsh male curler

- Curler
- Born: 25 December 1940; Birkenhead, England
- Died: 19 February 2016 (aged 75)

Team
- Curling club: Deeside CC

Curling career
- Member Association: Wales
- World Championship: 1 (1995)
- European Championship: 8 (1989, 1991, 1994, 1995, 1997, 2000, 2001, 2005)
- Other appearances: World Senior Championships: 7 (2003, 2004, 2006, 2008, 2011, 2012, 2014)
Medal record
Curling

Hugh Meikle (25 December 1940 – 19 February 2016) was a Welsh curler and curling coach.

He started curling in Toronto, Ontario in late 1960s.

He was a founder of Welsh Curling Association in 1974.

== Teams ==
Season	Skip	Third	Second	Lead	Alternate	Coach	Events
1989–90	Adrian Meikle	Jamie Meikle	Hugh Meikle	Nick Leslie			ECC 1989 (8th)
1991–92	Adrian Meikle	Hugh Meikle	J. Paul Heiskle	Nick Leslie	Timothy Rhodes		ECC 1991 (12th)
1994–95	Adrian Meikle (fourth)	John Hunt (skip)	Jamie Meikle	Hugh Meikle			ECC 1994 (7th)
1994–95	Jamie Meikle (fourth)	Adrian Meikle	John Hunt (skip)	Hugh Meikle	Chris Wells		WCC 1995 (10th)
1995–96	Adrian Meikle	Jamie Meikle	John Hunt	Hugh Meikle	Chris Wells		ECC 1995 (13th)
1997–98	Adrian Meikle (fourth)	Jamie Meikle	John Hunt (skip)	Hugh Meikle	Chris Wells		ECC 1997 (8th)
2000–01	Adrian Meikle	Chris Wells	John Sharpe	Hugh Meikle	Andrew Tanner		ECC 2000 (16th)
2001–02	Adrian Meikle	Chris Wells	Andrew Tanner	John Sharpe	Hugh Meikle	Dave Pritchard	ECC 2001 (14th)
2002–03	Hugh Meikle	Peter Harris	Ray King	Chris Wells			WSCC 2003 (11th)
2003–04	Hugh Meikle	Chris Wells	Peter Williams	Ray King	Scott Lyon		WSCC 2004 (13th)
2005–06	Adrian Meikle	Jamie Meikle	Stuart Hills	Andrew Tanner	Hugh Meikle	Elizabeth Meikle	ECC 2005 (12th)
2005–06	Hugh Meikle (fourth)	Chris Wells (skip)	Michael Yuille	Hugh Hodge			WSCC 2006 (12th)
2007–08	Hugh Meikle	Michael Yuille	Stewart Cairns	Hugh Hodge	Chris Wells		WSCC 2008 (11th)
2010–11	Hugh Meikle (fourth)	Chris Wells (skip)	Michael Yuille	Stewart Cairns	Andrew Carr	Elizabeth Meikle	WSCC 2011 (15th)
2011–12	Chris Wells	Hugh Meikle	Stewart Cairns	Andrew Carr	Peter Sims	Gill Sims	WSCC 2012 (19th)
2013–14	Chris Wells	Hugh Meikle	Richard Pougher	Andrew Carr	Gary Waddell		WSCC 2014 (14th)

== Record as a coach of national teams ==
Year	Tournament, event	National team	Place
2007	2007 European Curling Championships	Wales (men)	17
2011	2011 European Junior Curling Challenge	Wales (junior men)	12

== Personal life ==
His wife Elizabeth is a curler and coach; his sons Adrian and Jamie are also a curlers.
