= Adrian Meikle =

Welsh curler

- Curler
- Born: 17 March 1965 (age 61)

Curling career
- World Championship: 1 (1995)
- World Mixed Doubles Championship: 3 (2014, 2016, 2017)
- European Championship: 22 (1982, 1989, 1991, 1993, 1994, 1995, 1997, 2000, 2001, 2002, 2003, 2004, 2005, 2006, 2007, 2009, 2010, 2012, 2013, 2014, 2016, 2018)
Medal record
Curling
Representing Wales
European Mixed Curling Championship
Gold medal – first place	2007 Madrid

Adrian Meikle (born 17 March 1965) is a Welsh curler and member of the Wales Men's Curling Team that takes part in the European Curling Championships. He is also a member of the Welsh Mixed Doubles and Senior Team.

He played in one World Curling Championships, in 1995 as a second for Wales.

He won a gold medal at the 2007 European Mixed Curling Championship as a skip.

== Personal life ==
He is a son of Hugh Meikle, Welsh curler and one of the founders of Welsh Curling Association.
