= 2010 European Curling Championships =

Coordinates: 46°10′41″N 6°52′13″E

2010 Le Gruyère European Curling Championship
- Host city: Champéry, Switzerland
- Arena: Palladium de Champéry
- Dates: December 3–11, 2010
- Men's winner: Norway
- Curling club: Snarøen CC, Oslo
- Skip: Thomas Ulsrud
- Third: Torger Nergård
- Second: Christoffer Svae
- Lead: Håvard Vad Petersson
- Alternate: Markus Høiberg
- Finalist: Denmark (Rasmus Stjerne)
- Women's winner: Sweden
- Skip: Stina Viktorsson
- Third: Christina Bertrup
- Second: Maria Wennerström
- Lead: Margaretha Sigfridsson
- Alternate: Agnes Knochenhauer
- Finalist: Scotland (Eve Muirhead)

The 2010 Le Gruyère European Curling Championships were held in Champéry, Switzerland from December 3–11, 2010. The Group C matches took place from September 24–28 at the Greenacres Ice Rink in Howwood, Scotland. The winners of the Group C matches advanced to the Group B playoffs in Monthey. The Group A round robin matches took place from December 4–11 at the Palladium de Champéry in Champéry, while the Group B matches took place at the Verney Arena in Monthey.

Sweden's Stina Viktorsson won the gold medal when her rink defeated the Eve Muirhead rink from Scotland. Switzerland's Mirjam Ott won the bronze medal game over Russia's Liudmila Privivkova in 9 ends. The Thomas Ulsrud rink from Norway won in the final over Rasmus Stjerne's rink from Denmark, which played surprisingly well at the championships this year. Switzerland's Christof Schwaller won the bronze medal after defeating Germany's Andy Kapp.

Six women's teams qualified for the 2011 World Women's Curling Championship in Esbjerg, Denmark. They are: Sweden, Scotland, Switzerland, Russia, Norway, and the Czech Republic (who defeated Latvia in the World Challenge). Only six nations qualified because the host (Denmark) and the defending champion (Germany) are automatically qualified. Eight men's teams qualified for the 2011 Ford World Men's Curling Championship in Regina, Saskatchewan, Canada. They are: Norway, Denmark, Switzerland, Germany, Scotland, Czech Republic, France (who defeated Italy in the World Challenge).

The 2010 European Curling Championships marked the first European curling tournament that Turkey was represented at. Turkey was represented by a men's and women's berth, and their women's berth advanced to the B Group of the championships.

== Schedule ==
Date	Group A		Group B	
Date	Event	Time	Event	Time
December 3 Friday	Opening Ceremony			
December 4 Saturday	Round Robin - Draw	08:00 (W); 12:00 (M); 16:00 (W); 20:00 (M)	Round Robin - Draw	08:00 (M); 12:00 (W); 16:00 (M); 20:00 (W)
December 5 Sunday	Round Robin - Draw	11:00 (W); 16:00 (M); 20:00 (W)	Round Robin - Draw	08:00 (M); 12:00 (W); 16:00 (M); 20:00 (W)
December 6 Monday	Round Robin - Draw	08:00 (M); 12:00 (W); 16:00 (M); 20:00 (W)	Round Robin - Draw	08:00 (M); 12:00 (W); 16:00 (M); 20:00 (W)
December 7 Tuesday	Round Robin - Draw	10:00 (M); 15:00 (W); 19:00 (M)	Round Robin - Draw	08:00 (M); 12:00 (W); 16:00 (M); 20:00 (W)
December 8 Wednesday	Round Robin - Draw	10:00 (W); 16:00 (M); 20:00 (W)	Round Robin - Draw	08:00 (M); 12:00 (W); 16:00 (M)
December 9 Thursday	Round Robin - Draw	8:00 (M)	Tiebreaks; Playoffs	
December 9 Thursday	Tiebreaks	12:00 (more if needed)	Tiebreaks; Playoffs	
December 9 Thursday	Play-offs	20:00; 9:00	Tiebreaks; Playoffs	
December 10; Friday	Play-offs	20:00; 9:00	Semifinals; Finals	8:00; 13:00
December 10; Friday	Semifinals	16:00; 20:00	Semifinals; Finals	8:00; 13:00
December 11; Saturday	Bronze Final	8:00	Bronze Final	9:30
December 11; Saturday	Finals	12:00 (W); 16:00 (M)	Challenge World Championships	9:30; 14:00
December 11; Saturday	Closing Ceremony			

== Men's tournament ==
=== Group A ===
10 men's berths were qualified for Group A, including defending champions Sweden and last year's B Group qualifiers (Russia and the Netherlands).

==== Results ====
Switzerland, Norway, and Germany finished the round-robin with a 7–2 win–loss record, while Denmark finished with a 6–3 record. Switzerland was defeated by Norway 4–5 in the tenth end and Denmark defeated Germany 10–5 with a game-ending 5-point end in the page playoffs. Norway moved on to the gold final, while Denmark was able to defeat Switzerland in the semifinal, 9–7. Denmark faced Norway in the final, where Norway won 5–3, while Switzerland won over Germany, 7–4.

Page playoff system
1	Switzerland	4
2	Norway	5
3	Germany	5
4	Denmark	10

Semifinal
1	Switzerland	7
4	Denmark	9

Gold Medal Game
2	Norway	5
4	Denmark	3

Bronze Medal Game
1	Switzerland	7
3	Germany	4

Gold Medal Game

Saturday, December 11, 16:00

Sheet C	1	2	3	4	5	6	7	8	9	10	Final
Norway (Ulsrud)	1	0	0	1	0	0	2	0	0	1	5
Denmark (Stjerne)	0	0	1	0	0	1	0	0	1	0	3

Bronze Medal Game

Saturday, December 11, 8:00

Sheet B	1	2	3	4	5	6	7	8	9	10	Final
Switzerland (Schwaller)	1	0	2	0	0	1	1	0	2	X	7
Germany (Kapp)	0	1	0	2	0	0	0	1	0	X	4

=== Group B ===
16 men's berths were qualified for Group B, including the teams advancing from Group C (Slovakia and Belarus) and the teams relegated from last year's A Group (Finland and Italy). They are split into two eight-team groups (B1 and B2).

==== Results ====
Latvia and Ireland finished at the top of Group B1, while Italy and Slovakia finished at the top of their groups. In the page playoffs, Latvia won over Italy 9–5, while Ireland defeated Slovakia 8–2. Italy won over Ireland 6–5 in 11 ends to advance to the final and face Latvia once more. This time, Italy was able to win over Latvia in an extra end, 10–7. Ireland won over Slovakia in 8 ends, 9–2.

Page playoff system
B1-1	Latvia	9
B2-1	Italy	5
B1-2	Ireland	8
B2-2	Slovakia	2

Semifinal
B2-1	Italy	6
B1-2	Ireland	5

Gold Medal Game
B1-1	Latvia	7
B2-1	Italy	10

Bronze Medal Game
B1-2	Ireland	9
B2-2	Slovakia	2

Gold Medal Game

Sheet K	1	2	3	4	5	6	7	8	9	10	11	Final
Latvia (Gulbis)	2	2	0	2	0	1	0	0	0	0	0	7
Italy (Retornaz)	0	0	1	0	1	0	1	1	2	1	3	10

Bronze Medal Game

Sheet K	1	2	3	4	5	6	7	8	9	10	Final
Ireland (Gray)	1	3	1	1	1	0	0	2	X	X	9
Slovakia (Pitonak)	0	0	0	0	0	1	1	0	X	X	2

=== Group C ===
Seven men's berths competed in the first ever Group C tournament.

==== Results ====
Slovakia and Belarus finished at the top of the group with 5–1 win–loss records. They both qualified for the B Group tournament, and played in the Group C Final, where Slovakia defeated Belarus in 8 ends.

Gold Medal Game

Sheet E	1	2	3	4	5	6	7	8	9	10	Final
Slovakia (Pitonak)	1	1	1	2	0	2	1	2	X	X	10
Belarus (Kirillov)	0	0	0	0	1	0	0	0	X	X	1

== Women's tournament ==
=== Group A ===
10 women's berths were qualified for Group A, including defending champions Germany and last year's B Group qualifiers (the Netherlands and Latvia).

==== Results ====
Scotland advanced to the playoffs with an impressive 8–1 record; Russia and Switzerland advanced with a 7–2 record, and Sweden with a 6–3 record. In the playoffs, Scotland defeated Russia in 9 ends with a 9–4 score. Sweden was able to work its way to the gold final, defeating Switzerland 5–3 in the playoffs and passing by Russia 7–5 in the semifinals. Sweden met and defeated Scotland in the final, 8–6, taking home the gold. The Switzerland rink faced Russia in the bronze final, winning 9–5 in 9 ends.

Page playoff system
1	Scotland	9
2	Russia	4
3	Switzerland	3
4	Sweden	5

Semifinal
2	Russia	5
4	Sweden	7

Gold Medal Game
1	Scotland	6
4	Sweden	8

Bronze Medal Game
2	Russia	5
3	Switzerland	9

Gold Medal Game

Sheet C	1	2	3	4	5	6	7	8	9	10	Final
Scotland (Muirhead)	2	0	1	0	0	0	2	1	0	0	6
Sweden (Viktorsson)	0	2	0	0	2	1	0	0	2	1	8

Bronze Medal Game

Sheet D	1	2	3	4	5	6	7	8	9	10	Final
Russia (Privivkova)	2	0	0	1	0	0	1	0	1	X	5
Switzerland (Ott)	0	0	2	0	4	1	0	2	0	X	9

=== Group B ===
10 women's berths were qualified for Group B, including the teams advancing from Group C (Ireland and Turkey) and the teams relegated from last year's A Group (England and Italy).

==== Results ====
The Czech Republic finished the round-robin undefeated with an impressive 9–0 record, while Hungary, Austria, and Italy finished with a 7–2 record. The Czech berth defeated Hungary 8–6 in an extra end and Italy defeated Austria 6–3 in the page playoffs. Italy met Hungary in the semifinal and defeated them 7–6. The Czech rink then scored a resounding 14–7 win over Italy in the final game. Austria won over Hungary in the bronze final after an extra end, 5–4.

Page playoff system
1	Czech Republic	8
2	Hungary	6
3	Austria	3
4	Italy	6

Semifinal
2	Hungary	6
4	Italy	7

Gold Medal Game
1	Czech Republic	14
4	Italy	7

Bronze Medal Game
3	Austria	5
2	Hungary	4

Bronze Medal Game

Sheet J	1	2	3	4	5	6	7	8	9	10	11	Final
Austria (Toth)	0	0	0	1	0	0	0	2	0	1	1	5
Hungary (Szekeres)	0	0	0	0	3	0	0	0	1	0	0	4

Gold Medal Game

Sheet J	1	2	3	4	5	6	7	8	9	10	Final
Czech Republic (Kubeskova)	2	0	1	0	0	0	6	0	5	X	14
Italy (Menardi)	0	1	0	1	3	1	0	1	0	X	7

=== Group C ===
Five women's berths competed in the first ever Group C tournament.

==== Results ====
The Turkish team, making its debut in an international curling competition, finished the round robin undefeated at 4–0, while Ireland held a 3–1 record. In the final, Ireland would open with a 4-point end and dominated the game, winning 11–3 over Turkey in 8 ends.

Gold Medal Game

Sheet E	1	2	3	4	5	6	7	8	9	10	Final
Ireland (Hibberd)	4	0	0	0	2	1	3	1	X	X	11
Turkey (Akyildiz)	0	1	1	1	0	0	0	0	X	X	3
