= 1993 European Curling Championships =

- Host city: Leukerbad, Switzerland
- Arena: Sportzentrum
- Dates: December 6–11
- Men's winner: Norway
- Curling club: Snarøyen CC, Oslo
- Skip: Eigil Ramsfjell
- Third: Sjur Loen
- Second: Dagfinn Loen
- Lead: Niclas Järund
- Alternate: Espen de Lange
- Coach: Thoralf Hognestad
- Finalist: Denmark
- Women's winner: Sweden
- Curling club: Umeå CK, Umeå
- Skip: Elisabet Gustafson
- Third: Katarina Nyberg
- Second: Louise Marmont
- Lead: Elisabeth Persson
- Alternate: Eva Lund
- Coach: Jan Strandlund
- Finalist: Switzerland

The 1993 European Curling Championships were held from December 6 to 11 at the Sportzentrum in Leukerbad, Switzerland.

== Men's ==
=== A Tournament ===
==== Group A ====
Team	Skip	W	L
Norway	Eigil Ramsfjell	6	0
Denmark	Tommy Stjerne	4	2
Switzerland	Markus Eggler	4	2
Scotland	Hammy McMillan	3	3
Sweden	Peja Lindholm	2	4
France	Jan Henri Ducroz	1	5
Germany	Andy Kapp	1	5

=== Playoffs ===
Semifinal
1	Norway	7
4	Scotland	6
2	Denmark	7
3	Switzerland	6

Final
1	Norway	7
2	Denmark	6

Bronze medal
3	Switzerland	7
4	Scotland	6

== Women's ==
=== Group A ===
Team	Skip	W	L
Sweden	Elisabet Gustafson	5	1
Norway	Dordi Nordby	4	2
Switzerland	Diana Kaufmann	4	2
Scotland	Jackie Lockhart	3	3
Finland	Jaana Jokela	3	3
Germany	Josefine Einsle	2	4
England	Sally Gray	0	6

=== Tiebreaker ===
- Scotland 8-4 Finland

=== Playoffs ===
Semifinal
1	Sweden	5
4	Scotland	3
2	Norway	4
3	Switzerland	7

Final
1	Sweden	8
3	Switzerland	4

Bronze medal
2	Norway	8
4	Scotland	7
