= Curling Club Utrecht =

Dutch curling club

The Curling Club Utrecht is the second biggest curling club in the Netherlands. It is located in Utrecht and is based at the Vechtsebanen there.
