= Floris van Imhoff =

Dutch curler

Floris van Imhoff (born 21 January 1964, Wassenaar) is a former Dutch curler. Now coaching the Praxis Hammerheads, he has curled in 12 European Curling Championships. He skipped the Dutch team four times (1996, 1997, 1998, 2003). On top of 12 years of European Curling Championship experience, van Imhoff was the third for Wim Neeleman at the 1994 World Curling Championship. They finished a respectable 7th place.
