= 1987 World Women's Curling Championship =

Sports Event

- Host city: Lake Forest, Illinois, United States
- Arena: Lake Forest College
- Dates: March 22–28, 1987
- Winner: Canada
- Curling club: Victoria CC, Victoria, British Columbia
- Skip: Pat Sanders
- Third: Georgina Hawkes
- Second: Louise Herlinveaux
- Lead: Deb Massullo
- Finalist: Germany (Andrea Schöpp)

The 1987 World Women's Curling Championship was held at Lake Forest College near Chicago, Illinois from March 22–28, 1987.

== Teams ==
Canada	Denmark	Finland	France	Germany
Victoria CC, Victoria Skip: Pat Sanders; Third: Georgina Hawkes; Second: Louise Herlinveaux; Lead: Deb Massullo	Hvidovre CC, Hvidovre Fourth: Jette Olsen; Skip: Helena Blach; Second: Malene Krause; Lead: Lone Kristoffersen	Hyvinkää CC, Hyvinkää Fourth: Taru Kivinen; Skip: Jaana Jokela; Second: Nina Ahvenainen; Lead: Kirsi Jeskanen	Megève CC, Megève Fourth: Annick Mercier; Skip: Agnes Mercier; Second: Andrée Dupont-Roc; Lead: Catherine Lefebvre	SC Riessersee, Garmisch-Partenkirchen Skip: Andrea Schöpp; Third: Almut Hege; Second: Monika Wagner; Lead: Elinore Schöpp
Norway	Scotland	Sweden	Switzerland	United States
Snarøen CC, Oslo Skip: Anne Jøtun Bakke; Third: Hilde Jøtun; Second: Ingvill Githmark; Lead: Billie Sørum	Greenacres CC, Renfrewshire Skip: Marion Miller; Third: Janice Miller; Second: Jane McConnell; Lead: Moira McConnell	Karlstads CK, Karlstad Skip: Elisabeth Högström; Third: Birgitta Sewik; Second: Eva Andersson; Lead: Bitte Berg; Alternate: Inga Arfwidsson	Winterthur CC, Winterthur Skip: Marianne Flotron; Third: Gisela Peter; Second: Beatrice Frei; Lead: Caroline Rück	Granite CC, Seattle Skip: Sharon Good; Third: Joan Fish; Second: Beth Bronger-Jones; Lead: Aija Edwards

== Round-robin standings ==
Country	Skip	W	L
Canada	Pat Sanders	8	1
Germany	Andrea Schöpp	7	2
Norway	Anne Jøtun Bakke	6	3
Switzerland	Marianne Flotron	6	3
United States	Sharon Good	5	4
Sweden	Elisabeth Högström	5	4
Finland	Jaana Jokela	2	7
France	Agnes Mercier	2	7
Scotland	Marion Miller	2	7
Denmark	Helena Blach	2	7

== Tiebreakers ==
- Denmark 6-5 Finland
- France 7-6 Scotland
- Finland 7-6 Scotland
- Denmark 7-1 France

== Playoffs ==
Semifinal
1	Canada	5
4	Switzerland	4
2	Germany	9
3	Norway	2

Gold Medal Game
1	Canada	14
2	Germany	2
Bronze Medal Game
4	Switzerland	7
3	Norway	4

1987 World Women's Curling Championship Winner
(Canada)
Canada
5th title
