= 1982 World Women's Curling Championship =

- Host city: Geneva, Switzerland
- Arena: Patinoire des Vernets
- Dates: March 16–21
- Winner: Denmark
- Curling club: Hvidovre CC, Hvidovre
- Skip: Marianne Jørgensen
- Fourth: Helena Blach
- Second: Astrid Birnbaum
- Lead: Jette Olsen
- Finalist: Sweden (Elisabeth Högström)

The 1982 World Women's Curling Championship, the women's world curling championship, was held from March 16–21 at the Patinoire des Vernets in Geneva, Switzerland.

== Teams ==
Canada	Denmark	France	Germany	Italy
Halifax CC, Halifax, Nova Scotia Skip: Colleen Jones; Third: Kay Smith; Second: Monica Jones; Lead: Barbara Jones-Gorden	Hvidovre CC, Hvidovre Fourth: Helena Blach; Skip: Marianne Jørgensen; Second: Astrid Birnbaum; Lead: Jette Olsen	Mont d'Arbois CC, Megève Fourth: Huguette Jullien; Third: Agnes Mercier; Skip: Paulette Sulpice; Lead: Eva Duvillard	CC Schwenningen, Schwenningen Skip: Susi Kiesel; Third: Gisela Lunz; Second: Trudi Benzing; Lead: Daniela Kiesel	Cortina CC, Cortina d'Ampezzo Skip: Maria-Grazzia Constantini; Third: Ann Lacedelli; Second: Tea Valt; Lead: Angela Constantini
Norway	Scotland	Sweden	Switzerland	United States
Snarøen CC, Oslo Skip: Trine Trulsen; Third: Dordi Nordby; Second: Hanne Pettersen; Lead: Cathrine Hannevig	Hamilton & Thornyhill CC, Hamilton Skip: Isobel Torrance; Third: Isobel Waddell; Second: Marion Armour; Lead: Margaret Wiseman	Karlstads CK, Karlstad Skip: Elisabeth Högström; Third: Katarina Hultling; Second: Birgitta Sewik; Lead: Karin Sjögren	Bern Egghölzi Damen CC, Bern Skip: Erika Müller; Third: Barbara Meyer; Second: Nicole Oetliker; Lead: Cristina Wirz	Oak Park Acorns CC, Oak Park, Illinois Skip: Ruth Schwenker; Third: Stephanie Flynn; Second: Donna Purkey; Lead: Kathleen Wilson

== Round-robin standings ==
Key
Teams to playoffs
Teams to tiebreaker

Country	Skip	W	L
Denmark	Marianne Jørgensen	7	2
Scotland	Isobel Torrance	6	3
Sweden	Elisabeth Högström	6	3
Norway	Trine Trulsen	6	3
Canada	Colleen Jones	6	3
France	Paulette Sulpice	5	4
Switzerland	Erika Müller	4	5
United States	Ruth Schwenker	2	7
Germany	Susi Kiesel	2	7
Italy	Maria-Grazzia Constantini	1	8

== Round-robin results ==
=== Draw 1 ===
Team	Final
United States (Schwenker)	3
Canada (Jones)	12

Team	Final
Denmark (Jørgensen)	11
Sweden (Högström)	5

Team	Final
Norway (Trulsen)	8
Scotland (Torrance)	11

Team	Final
Switzerland (Müller)	4
France (Sulpice)	10

Team	Final
Italy (Constantini)	7
Germany (Kiesel)	8

=== Draw 2 ===
Team	Final
Norway (Trulsen)	3
Sweden (Högström)	14

Team	Final
Switzerland (Müller)	9
Germany (Kiesel)	8

Team	Final
United States (Schwenker)	5
France (Sulpice)	6

Team	Final
Canada (Jones)	7
Italy (Constantini)	5

Team	Final
Denmark (Jørgensen)	10
Scotland (Torrance)	7

=== Draw 3 ===
Team	Final
France (Sulpice)	10
Germany (Kiesel)	7

Team	Final
Canada (Jones)	8
Scotland (Torrance)	7

Team	Final
Denmark (Jørgensen)	8
Italy (Constantini)	5

Team	Final
United States (Schwenker)	1
Sweden (Högström)	12

Team	Final
Norway (Trulsen)	12
Switzerland (Müller)	3

=== Draw 4 ===
Team	Final
Switzerland (Müller)	14
Italy (Constantini)	1

Team	Final
Norway (Trulsen)	4
United States (Schwenker)	7

Team	Final
Germany (Kiesel)	11
Sweden (Högström)	10

Team	Final
Denmark (Jørgensen)	7
Canada (Jones)	13

Team	Final
Scotland (Torrance)	1
France (Sulpice)	12

=== Draw 5 ===
Team	Final
Denmark (Jørgensen)	4
Norway (Trulsen)	7

Team	Final
Sweden (Högström)	8
France (Sulpice)	5

Team	Final
Switzerland (Müller)	13
United States (Schwenker)	4

Team	Final
Italy (Constantini)	0
Scotland (Torrance)	16

Team	Final
Canada (Jones)	13
Germany (Kiesel)	6

=== Draw 6 ===
Team	Final
Sweden (Högström)	8
Scotland (Torrance)	9

Team	Final
United States (Schwenker)	7
Italy (Constantini)	9

Team	Final
France (Sulpice)	6
Canada (Jones)	8

Team	Final
Norway (Trulsen)	9
Germany (Kiesel)	4

Team	Final
Switzerland (Müller)	7
Denmark (Jørgensen)	8

=== Draw 7 ===
Team	Final
Germany (Kiesel)	7
United States (Schwenker)	12

Team	Final
Scotland (Torrance)	8
Switzerland (Müller)	6

Team	Final
Italy (Constantini)	3
Norway (Trulsen)	7

Team	Final
France (Sulpice)	4
Denmark (Jørgensen)	14

Team	Final
Sweden (Högström)	6
Canada (Jones)	3

=== Draw 8 ===
Team	Final
Canada (Jones)	5
Switzerland (Müller)	7

Team	Final
France (Sulpice)	4
Norway (Trulsen)	10

Team	Final
Scotland (Torrance)	10
Germany (Kiesel)	8

Team	Final
Sweden (Högström)	6
Italy (Constantini)	5

Team	Final
Denmark (Jørgensen)	7
United States (Schwenker)	5

=== Draw 9 ===
Team	Final
Italy (Constantini)	5
France (Sulpice)	10

Team	Final
Germany (Kiesel)	1
Denmark (Jørgensen)	10

Team	Final
Sweden (Högström)	12
Switzerland (Müller)	5

Team	Final
Scotland (Torrance)	5
United States (Schwenker)	3

Team	Final
Canada (Jones)	5
Norway (Trulsen)	7

== Tiebreakers ==
=== Round 1 ===
Team	Final
Scotland (Torrance)	8
Canada (Jones)	6

Team	Final
Norway (Trulsen)	4
Sweden (Högström)	6

=== Round 2 ===
Team	Final
Canada (Jones)	6
Norway (Trulsen)	8

== Playoffs ==
Semifinals
1	Denmark	4
4	Norway	3
2	Sweden	8
3	Scotland	3

Final
1	Denmark	8
2	Sweden	7

=== Semifinals ===
Team	Final
Denmark (Jørgensen)	4
Norway (Trulsen)	3

Team	Final
Sweden (Högström)	8
Scotland (Torrance)	3

=== Final ===
Team	Final
Denmark (Jørgensen)	8
Sweden (Högström)	7

1982 World Women's Curling Championship
(Denmark)
Denmark
1st title
