= 1982 European Curling Championships =

- Host city: Kirkcaldy, Scotland
- Arena: Kirkcaldy Ice Rink
- Dates: 6–11 December
- Men's winner: Scotland
- Skip: Mike Hay
- Third: David Hay
- Second: David Smith
- Lead: Russell Keiller
- Finalist: Germany (Keith Wendorf)
- Women's winner: Sweden
- Curling club: Karlstads CK, Karlstad
- Skip: Elisabeth Högström
- Third: Katarina Hultling
- Second: Birgitta Sewik
- Lead: Karin Sjögren
- Finalist: Italy (Maria-Grazzia Constantini)

The 1982 European Curling Championships were held from 6 to 11 December at the Kirkcaldy Ice Rink arena in Kirkcaldy, Scotland.

The Scottish men's team skipped by Mike Hay won their third European title, and the Swedish women's team skipped by Elisabeth Högström won their fifth European title.

== Men's ==
=== Teams ===
Team	Skip	Third	Second	Lead	Curling club
Austria	Günther Mochny	Ronald Koudelka	Arthur Fabi	Jakob Küchl	
Denmark	Frants Gufler	Hans Gufler	Michael Sindt	Holger Slotsager	
England	Ronnie Brock	John Brown	Tony Fraser	Duncan Stewart	
Finland	Isto Kolemainen	Juhani Eholuoto	Jorma Mäkelä	Keijo Silvan	
France	Henri Müller	René Robert	Fernand Schillinger	Albert Lecomte	
Germany	Keith Wendorf	Hans Dieter Kiesel	Sven Saile	Heiner Martin	CC Schwenningen, Schwenningen
Italy	Andrea Pavani	Enrico Alberti	Giancarlo Valt	Gianantonio Gillarduzzi	
Luxembourg	Georges Schweich	William Bannerman	Denis Boulianne	Gisbert Franz	
Netherlands	Wim Neeleman	Robert van der Cammen	Gustaf van Imhoff	Jeroen Tilman	
Norway	Pål Trulsen	Flemming Davanger	Stig-Arne Gunnestad	Kjell Berg	
Scotland	Mike Hay	David Hay	David Smith	Russell Keiller	
Sweden	Tom Schaeffer	Bengt Oscarius	Lars Hegert	Claes-Göran Carlman	Djursholms CK, Stockholm
Switzerland	Jürg Tanner	Jürg Hornisberger	Patrik Lörtscher	Franz Tanner	Lausanne-Riviera CC, Lausanne
Wales	Peter Williams	Richard Davis	Ray King	Adrian Meikle	

=== Round robin ===
Group A

	Team	A1	A2	A3	A4	A5	A6	A7	W	L	Place
A1	England	*	4:6	5:9	10:3	6:11	6:9	5:9	1	5	6
A2	France	6:4	*	10:9	3:5	5:7	4:7	9:2	3	3	4
A3	Germany	9:5	9:10	*	10:4	13:7	9:5	14:2	5	1	1
A4	Italy	3:10	5:3	4:10	*	5:6	2:9	5:8	1	5	7
A5	Netherlands	11:6	7:5	7:13	6:5	*	6:13	8:3	4	2	3
A6	Switzerland	9:6	7:4	5:9	9:2	13:6	*	18:1	5	1	2
A7	Wales	9:5	2:9	2:14	8:5	3:8	1:18	*	2	4	5

Group B

	Team	B1	B2	B3	B4	B5	B6	B7	W	L	Place
B1	Austria	*	4:10	11:9	8:10	9:11	4:11	2:6	1	5	6
B2	Denmark	10:4	*	12:5	9:7	7:4	3:5	8:5	5	1	2
B3	Finland	9:11	5:12	*	7:8	1:15	3:11	1:13	0	6	7
B4	Luxembourg	10:8	7:9	8:7	*	3:14	3:10	5:6	2	4	5
B5	Norway	11:9	4:7	15:1	14:3	*	3:9	3:8	3	3	4
B6	Scotland	11:4	5:3	11:3	10:3	9:3	*	10:2	6	0	1
B7	Sweden	6:2	5:8	13:1	6:5	8:3	2:10	*	4	2	3

Teams to playoffs

=== Ranking games for 5th-14th places ===
For 13th place
Italy	17
Finland	8

For 11th place
England	7
Austria	9

For 9th place
Wales	13
Luxembourg	3

For 7th place
France	6
Norway	8

For 5th place
Netherlands	6
Sweden	8

=== Playoffs ===
Semifinals
A(1)	Germany	9
B(2)	Denmark	2
B(1)	Scotland	7
A(2)	Switzerland	6

Final
Germany	5
Scotland	6
Bronze game
Denmark	3
Switzerland	4

=== Final standings ===
Place	Team	Skip	GP	W	L
1st place, gold medalist(s)	Scotland	Mike Hay	8	8	0
2nd place, silver medalist(s)	Germany	Keith Wendorf	8	6	2
3rd place, bronze medalist(s)	Switzerland	Jürg Tanner	8	6	2
4	Denmark	Frants Gufler	8	5	3
5	Sweden	Tom Schaeffer	8	5	3
6	Netherlands	Wim Neeleman	7	4	3
7	Norway	Pål Trulsen	7	4	3
8	France	Henri Müller	7	3	4
9	Wales	Peter Williams	7	3	4
10	Luxembourg	Georges Schweich	7	2	5
11	Austria	Günther Mochny	7	2	5
12	England	Ronnie Brock	7	1	6
13	Italy	Andrea Pavani	7	2	5
14	Finland	Isto Kolemainen	7	0	7

== Women's ==
=== Teams ===
Team	Skip	Third	Second	Lead	Curling club
Austria	Herta Kuchenmeister	Monika Hölzl	Edeltraud Koudelka	Marianne Gartner	
Denmark	Jane Bidstrup	Iben Larsen	Maj-Brit Rejnholdt	Kirsten Hur	Hvidovre CC, Hvidovre
England	Christine Short	Malcolm Maxwell	Anne Walton	Anne Harvey	
France	Huguette Jullien (fourth)	Agnes Mercier	Paulette Sulpice (skip)	Monique Tournier	
Germany	Almut Hege	Josefine Einsle	Suzanne Koch	Petra Tschetsch	
Italy	Maria-Grazzia Constantini	Ann Lacedelli	Nella Alvera	Angela Constantini	
Luxembourg	Cilly Schweich	Madeleine van den Houten	Christianne Boulianne	Marie Garritze	
Netherlands	Els Neeleman	Netty Born	Lucie Wolfs	Lia van Elshout	
Norway	Trine Trulsen	Anne Jøtun Bakke	Hanne Pettersen	Cathrine Hannevig	
Scotland	Isobel Torrance	Isobel Waddell	Margaret Wiseman	Marion Armour	
Sweden	Elisabeth Högström	Katarina Hultling	Birgitta Sewik	Karin Sjögren	Karlstads CK, Karlstad
Switzerland	Susan Schlapbach	Irene Bürgi	Ursula Schlapbach	Katrin Peterhans	
Wales	Anne Stone	Elizabeth Hunt	Barbara Williams	Doris Vickers	

=== Round robin ===
Group A

	Team	A1	A2	A3	A4	A5	A6	A7	W	L	Place
A1	Austria	*	15:5	6:11	9:4	6:12	2:12	10:4	3	3	4
A2	England	5:15	*	2:13	12:7	1:15	5:11	9:7	2	4	5
A3	France	11:6	13:2	*	11:5	6:10	5:13	12:13	3	3	3
A4	Luxembourg	4:9	7:12	5:11	*	5:10	5:14	11:5	1	5	6
A5	Norway	12:6	15:1	10:6	10:5	*	8:4	11:6	6	0	1
A6	Switzerland	12:2	11:5	13:5	14:5	4:8	*	14:4	5	1	2
A7	Wales	4:10	7:9	13:12	5:11	6:11	4:14	*	1	5	7

Group B

	Team	B1	B2	B3	B4	B5	B6	W	L	Place
B1	Denmark	*	5:10	12:8	11:4	13:6	6:13	3	2	3
B2	Germany	10:5	*	6:13	12:0	5:6	8:9	2	3	5
B3	Italy	8:12	13:6	*	12:11	10:5	3:8	3	2	2
B4	Netherlands	4:11	0:12	11:12	*	5:14	2:16	0	5	6
B5	Scotland	6:13	6:5	5:10	14:5	*	4:9	2	3	4
B6	Sweden	13:6	9:8	8:3	16:2	9:4	*	5	0	1

Teams to playoffs
Teams to tiebreaker

=== Tiebreaker ===
.
Italy	10
Denmark	5

=== Ranking games for 5th-12th places ===
For 11th place
Luxembourg	4
Netherlands	10

For 9th place
England	3
Germany	14

For 7th place
Austria	2
Scotland	16

For 5th place
France	10
Denmark	5

=== Playoffs ===
Semifinals
A(1)	Norway	5
B(2)	Italy	9
B(1)	Sweden	8
A(2)	Switzerland	4

Final
Italy	2
Sweden	13
Bronze game
Norway	3
Switzerland	13

=== Final standings ===
Place	Team	Skip	GP	W	L
1st place, gold medalist(s)	Sweden	Elisabeth Högström	7	7	0
2nd place, silver medalist(s)	Italy	Maria-Grazzia Constantini	8	5	3
3rd place, bronze medalist(s)	Switzerland	Susan Schlapbach	8	6	2
4	Norway	Trine Trulsen	8	6	2
5	France	Paulette Sulpice	7	4	3
6	Denmark	Jane Bidstrup	7	3	4
7	Scotland	Isobel Torrance	6	3	3
8	Austria	Herta Kuchenmeister	7	3	4
9	Germany	Almut Hege	6	3	3
10	England	Christine Short	7	2	5
11	Netherlands	Els Neeleman	6	1	5
12	Luxembourg	Cilly Schweich	7	1	6
13	Wales	Anne Stone	6	1	5
