= Laura van Imhoff =

Dutch curler and coach

- Curler ♀

Team
- Curling club: Den Haag CC, The Hague

Curling career
- Member Association: Netherlands
- World Championship: 2 (1981, 1986)
- European Championship: 9 (1980, 1983, 1984, 1985, 1986, 1987, 1988, 1992, 1993)
Medal record
Curling

Laura van Imhoff is a Dutch curler and curling coach.

At the international level, she competed as the skip of the national women's team at two World and nine European championships.

== Teams ==
Season	Skip	Third	Second	Lead	Alternate	Coach	Events
1980–81	Laura van Imhoff	Hermance van den Houten	Annemie de Jongh	Hanneke Veening			ECC 1980 (8th); WCC 1981 (10th)
1983–84	Laura van Imhoff	Gerrie Veening	Kniertje van Kuyk	Hanneke Veening			ECC 1983 (5th)
1984–85	Laura van Imhoff	Gerrie Veening	Hanneke Veening	Jenny Bovenschen			ECC 1984 (12th)
1985–86	Laura van Imhoff	Gerrie Veening	Marjorie Querido	Jenny Bovenschen		Darrell Ell	ECC 1985 (11th)
1985–86	Laura van Imhoff	Elisabeth Veening	Jenny Bovenschen	Marjorie Querido			WCC 1986 (10th)
1986–87	Laura van Imhoff	Gerrie Veening	Jenny Bovenschen	Mirjam Gast			ECC 1986 (8th)
1987–88	Laura van Imhoff	Gerrie Veening	Kniertje van Kuyk	Mirjam Gast			ECC 1987 (11th)
1988–89	Laura van Imhoff	Gerrie Veening	Jenny Bovenschen	Mirjam Gast			ECC 1988 (7th)
1992–93	Laura van Imhoff	Mirjam Boymans-Gast	Jacobyn Korthals Alks	Viola van den Hurk		Darrell Ell	ECC 1992 (12th)
1993–94	Laura van Imhoff	Diane Leary	Jacobyn Korthals Alks	Viola van den Hurk	Mirjam Boymans-Gast		ECC 1993 (12th)

== Record as a coach of national teams ==
Year	Tournament, event	National team	Place
1994	1994 European Curling Championships	Netherlands (women)	13
