= Schlapbach =

Schlapbach is a surname. Notable people with the surname include:

- Susan Schlapbach, Swiss female curler
- Ursula Schlapbach, Swiss female curler
