= 1981 European Curling Championships =

- Host city: Grindelwald, Switzerland
- Arena: Sportzentrum
- Dates: 7–12 December
- Men's winner: Switzerland
- Skip: Jürg Tanner
- Third: Jürg Hornisberger
- Second: Patrik Lörtscher
- Lead: Franz Tanner
- Finalist: Sweden (Göran Roxin)
- Women's winner: Switzerland
- Curling club: CC Bern, Bern
- Skip: Susan Schlapbach
- Third: Irene Bürgi
- Second: Ursula Schlapbach
- Lead: Katrin Peterhans
- Finalist: Sweden (Elisabeth Högström)

The 1981 European Curling Championships were held from 7 to 12 December at the Sportzentrum arena in Grindelwald, Switzerland.

The Swiss men's team skipped by Jürg Tanner won their third European title, and the Swiss women's team skipped by Susan Schlapbach won their second European title.

For the first time, the men's team of Austria and Finland and women's teams of Austria and Luxembourg took part in the European Championship.

== Men's ==
=== Teams ===
Team	Skip	Third	Second	Lead	Alternate	Curling club
Austria	Arthur Fabi	Ludwig Karrer	Manfred Fabi	Dieter Küchenmeister		
Denmark	Per Berg	Gert Larsen	Jan Hansen	Michael Harry		Hvidovre CC, Hvidovre
England	Bob Martin	Ronald D. Thornton	John D. Kerr	Michael Thompson		
Finland	Isto Kolemainen	Juhani Heinonen	Pekka Sylvander	Keijo Silvan		
France	André Tronc	Maurice Mercier	Yves Tronc	Jean-Francois Orset		
Germany	Keith Wendorf	Hans Dieter Kiesel	Sven Saile	Heiner Martin		
Italy	Giuseppe Dal Molin	Massimo Alvera	Franco Sovilla	Claudio Alvera		
Luxembourg	Marco Staedtgen	William Bannerman	Nico Schweich	Guy Schweich		
Netherlands	Otto Veening	Robin Claushuis	Gustaf van Imhoff	Sytze van Dam		
Norway	Pål Trulsen	Flemming Davanger	Stig-Arne Gunnestad	Kjell Berg		
Scotland	Colin Hamilton	W. Michael Dick	David Ramsay	Richard Pretsel		
Sweden	Göran Roxin	Björn Rudström	Håkan Rudström	Christer Mårtensson	Hans Timan	Magnus Ladulås CK, Stockholm
Switzerland	Jürg Tanner	Jürg Hornisberger	Patrik Lörtscher	Franz Tanner		
Wales	Richard Davis	David Humphreys	Chris Wells	Ray King		

=== Round robin ===
Group A

	Team	A1	A2	A3	A4	A5	A6	A7	W	L	Place
A1	Austria	*	6:7	5:6	5:8	10:8	6:14	5:7	1	5	6
A2	England	7:6	*	7:9	7:9	10:6	4:14	3:11	2	4	5
A3	France	6:5	9:7	*	3:10	11:3	7:6	4:7	4	2	3
A4	Germany	8:5	9:7	10:3	*	11:4	7:6	5:7	5	1	2
A5	Netherlands	8:10	6:10	3:11	4:11	*	4:9	1:13	0	6	7
A6	Scotland	14:6	14:4	6:7	6:7	9:4	*	4:7	3	3	4
A7	Switzerland	7:5	11:3	7:4	7:5	13:1	7:4	*	6	0	1

Group B

	Team	B1	B2	B3	B4	B5	B6	B7	W	L	Place
B1	Denmark	*	12:5	11:6	6:5	7:6	9:10	13:3	5	1	2
B2	Finland	5:12	*	3:7	7:6	2:13	3:13	3:8	1	5	7
B3	Italy	6:11	7:3	*	15:3	2:7	3:9	12:2	3	3	4
B4	Luxembourg	5:6	6:7	3:15	*	1:14	2:9	11:9	1	5	5
B5	Norway	6:7	13:2	7:2	14:1	*	7:8	14:2	4	2	3
B6	Sweden	10:9	13:3	9:3	9:2	8:7	*	14:4	6	0	1
B7	Wales	3:13	8:3	2:12	9:11	2:14	4:14	*	1	5	6

Teams to playoffs

=== Ranking games for 5th-14th places ===
For 13th place
Netherlands	5
Finland	2

For 11th place
Austria	10
Wales	4

For 9th place
England	7
Luxembourg	6

For 7th place
Scotland	6
Italy	5

For 5th place
France	8
Norway	6

=== Playoffs ===
Semifinals
A(1)	Switzerland	5
B(2)	Denmark	1
B(1)	Sweden	7
A(2)	Germany	6

Final
Switzerland	8
Sweden	6
Bronze game
Denmark	10
Germany	4

=== Final standings ===
Place	Team	Skip	GP	W	L
1st place, gold medalist(s)	Switzerland	Jürg Tanner	8	8	0
2nd place, silver medalist(s)	Sweden	Göran Roxin	8	7	1
3rd place, bronze medalist(s)	Denmark	Per Berg	8	6	2
4	Germany	Keith Wendorf	8	5	3
5	France	André Tronc	7	5	2
6	Norway	Pål Trulsen	7	4	3
7	Scotland	Colin Hamilton	7	4	3
8	Italy	Giuseppe Dal Molin	7	3	4
9	England	Bob Martin	7	3	4
10	Luxembourg	Marco Staedtgen	7	1	6
11	Austria	Arthur Fabi	7	2	5
12	Wales	Richard Davis	7	1	6
13	Netherlands	Otto Veening	7	1	6
14	Finland	Isto Kolemainen	7	1	6

== Women's ==
=== Teams ===
Team	Skip	Third	Second	Lead	Curling club
Austria	Marianne Gartner	Antje Karrer	Susanne Wieser	Herta Kuchenmeister	Kitzbühel CC, Kitzbühel
Denmark	Helena Blach	Marianne Jørgensen	Astrid Birnbaum	Malene Krause	Hvidovre CC, Hvidovre
England	Gwen French	Pauline Douglas	Jean Picken	Lynda Clegg	
France	Huguette Jullien (fourth)	Agnes Mercier	Paulette Sulpice (skip)	Anne-Claude Kennerson	
Germany	Andrea Schöpp	Monica Wackerle	Monika Wagner	Marga Hupertz	SC Riessersee, Garmisch-Partenkirchen
Italy	Maria-Grazzia Constantini	Ann Lacedelli	Tea Valt	Angela Constantini	
Luxembourg	Micheline Städtgen	Sanny Mohnen	Madeleine van den Houten	Carine Schweich	
Netherlands	Margreet Poost	Elly de Vries	Marianne Mirck	Nicole van den Brink	
Norway	Trine Trulsen	Dordi Nordby	Hanne Pettersen	Cathrine Hannevig	Snarøyen CC, Oslo
Scotland	Helen Caird	Rae Gray	Sheena Hay	Helen Watson	Broughty Ferry Ladies CC, Dundee
Sweden	Elisabeth Högström	Katarina Hultling	Birgitta Sewik	Karin Sjögren	Karlstads CK, Karlstad
Switzerland	Susan Schlapbach	Irene Bürgi	Ursula Schlapbach	Katrin Peterhans	CC Bern, Bern
Wales	Jean King	Sheila Nells	Rhoda Basnett	Madzia Williams	

=== Round robin ===
Group A

	Team	A1	A2	A3	A4	A5	A6	A7	W	L	Place
A1	Austria	*	4:11	3:8	15:6	16:7	1:14	3:18	2	4	5
A2	Denmark	11:4	*	6:4	11:6	14:6	7:9	3:4	4	2	2
A3	France	8:3	4:6	*	14:4	13:4	8:7	5:10	4	2	3
A4	Luxembourg	6:15	6:11	4:14	*	3:15	9:7	3:15	1	5	7
A5	Netherlands	7:16	6:14	4:13	15:3	*	3:9	3:15	1	5	6
A6	Scotland	14:1	9:7	7:8	7:9	9:3	*	7:6	4	2	4
A7	Sweden	18:3	4:3	10:5	15:3	15:3	6:7	*	5	1	1

Group B

	Team	B1	B2	B3	B4	B5	B6	W	L	Place
B1	England	*	5:13	6:9	6:15	3:9	7:8	0	5	6
B2	Germany	13:5	*	4:6	5:9	6:5	10:9	3	2	3
B3	Italy	9:6	6:4	*	3:9	5:7	3:4	2	3	5
B4	Norway	15:6	9:5	9:3	*	3:4	9:2	4	1	2
B5	Switzerland	9:3	5:6	7:5	4:3	*	8:3	4	1	1
B6	Wales	8:7	9:10	4:3	2:9	3:8	*	2	3	4

Teams to playoffs

=== Ranking games for 5th-12th places ===
For 11th place
Netherlands	10
England	6

For 9th place
Austria	6
Italy	3

For 7th place
Scotland	11
Wales	3

For 5th place
France	10
Germany	4

=== Playoffs ===
Semifinals
A(1)	Sweden	7
B(2)	Norway	5
B(1)	Switzerland	7
A(2)	Denmark	6

Final
Sweden	5
Switzerland	8
Bronze game
Norway	4
Denmark	8

=== Final standings ===
Place	Team	Skip	GP	W	L
1st place, gold medalist(s)	Switzerland	Susan Schlapbach	7	6	1
2nd place, silver medalist(s)	Sweden	Elisabeth Högström	8	6	2
3rd place, bronze medalist(s)	Denmark	Helena Blach	8	5	3
4	Norway	Trine Trulsen	7	4	3
5	France	Paulette Sulpice	7	5	2
6	Germany	Andrea Schöpp	6	3	3
7	Scotland	Helen Caird	7	5	2
8	Wales	Jean King	6	2	4
9	Austria	Marianne Gartner	7	3	4
10	Italy	Maria-Grazzia Constantini	6	2	4
11	Netherlands	Margreet Poost	7	2	5
12	England	Gwen French	6	0	6
13	Luxembourg	Micheline Städtgen	6	1	5
