= Bitte Berg =

Swedish female curler

- Curler ♀
- Born: 21 February 1961 (age 65)

Team
- Curling club: Karlstads CK, Karlstad

Curling career
- Member Association: Sweden
- World Championship: 1 (1987)
- European Championship: 1 (1986)
Medal record
Curling
Swedish Women's Championship
Gold medal – first place	1986

Bitte Berg (born 21 February 1961) is a Swedish female curler.

== Teams ==
Season	Skip	Third	Second	Lead	Alternate	Events
1979–80	Carina Fredström	Lotta Giesenfeld	Bitte Berg	Tette Alström		SJCC 1980 (gold)
1985–86	Elisabeth Högström	Birgitta Sewik	Eva Andersson	Bitte Berg		SWCC 1986 (gold)
1986–87	Elisabeth Högström	Birgitta Sewik	Eva Andersson	Bitte Berg	Inga Arfwidsson (WCC)	ECC 1986 (7th); WCC 1987 (6th)

== Personal life ==
Her husband is fellow curler Connie Östlund, as is their daughter, Cecilia Östlund.
