= Eva Andersson (curler) =

Swedish curler (born 1970)

- Curler ♀
- Born: 3 June 1970 (age 56)

Team
- Curling club: Karlstads CK, Karlstad

Curling career
- Member Association: Sweden
- World Championship: 1 (1987)
- European Championship: 1 (1986)
Medal record
Curling
Swedish Women's Championship
| Gold medal – first place | 1986 |

Eva Andersson (born 3 June 1970) is a Swedish female curler.

== Teams ==
| Season | Skip | Third | Second | Lead | Alternate | Events |
|---|---|---|---|---|---|---|
| 1985–86 | Elisabeth Högström | Birgitta Sewik | Eva Andersson | Bitte Berg | | SWCC 1986 (gold) |
| 1986–87 | Elisabeth Högström | Birgitta Sewik | Eva Andersson | Bitte Berg | Inga Arfwidsson (WCC) | ECC 1986 (7th); WCC 1987 (6th) |
