= 1981 Royal Bank of Scotland World Women's Curling Championship =

- Host city: Perth, Scotland
- Arena: Perth Ice Arena
- Dates: 16–21 March
- Winner: Sweden
- Curling club: Karlstads CK, Karlstad
- Skip: Elisabeth Högström
- Third: Carina Olsson
- Second: Birgitta Sewik
- Lead: Karin Sjögren
- Finalist: Canada (Susan Seitz)

The 1981 Royal Bank of Scotland World Women's Curling Championship, the women's world curling championship, was held from 16 to 21 March at the Perth Ice Arena in Perth, Scotland.

== Teams ==
Canada	Denmark	Germany	Italy	Netherlands
Calgary CC, Calgary, Alberta Skip: Susan Seitz; Third: Judy Erickson; Second: Myrna McKay; Lead: Betty McCracken	Hvidovre CC, Hvidovre Fourth: Helena Blach; Skip: Marianne Jørgensen; Second: Astrid Birnbaum; Lead: Malene Krause	EV Oberstdorf Skip: Almut Hege; Third: Suzanne Koch; Second: Renate Räderer; Lead: Ingeborg Stock	Cortina CC, Cortina d'Ampezzo Skip: Maria-Grazzia Constantini; Third: Ann Lacedelli; Second: Tea Valt; Lead: Marina Pavani	Den Haag CC, The Hague Skip: Laura van Imhoff; Third: Hermance van den Houten; Second: Annemie de Jongh; Lead: Hanneke Veening
Norway	Scotland	Sweden	Switzerland	United States
Oslo CC, Oslo Skip: Anne Jøtun Bakke; Third: Bente Hoel; Second: Elisabeth Skogen; Lead: Hilde Jøtun	Broughty Ferry Ladies CC, Dundee Skip: Helen Caird; Third: Rae Gray; Second: Sheena Hay; Lead: Helen Watson	Karlstads CK, Karlstad Skip: Elisabeth Högström; Third: Carina Olsson; Second: Birgitta Sewik; Lead: Karin Sjögren	CC Bern, Bern Skip: Susan Schlapbach; Third: Irene Bürgi; Second: Ursula Schlapbach; Lead: Katrin Peterhans	Granite CC, Seattle, Washington Skip: Nancy Langley; Third: Carol Dahl; Second: Leslie Frosch; Lead: Nancy Wallace

== Round-robin standings ==
Country	Skip	W	L
Canada	Susan Seitz	8	1
Sweden	Elisabeth Högström	8	1
Norway	Anne Jøtun Bakke	7	2
Switzerland	Susan Schlapbach	6	3
Denmark	Marianne Jørgensen	5	4
Scotland	Helen Caird	4	5
Italy	Maria-Grazzia Constantini	3	6
United States	Nancy Langley	2	7
Germany	Almut Hege	2	7
Netherlands	Laura van Imhoff	0	9

== Round-robin results ==
=== Draw 1 ===
Team	Final
Denmark (Jørgensen)	9
Italy (Constantini)	8

Team	Final
Germany (Hege)	8
Netherlands (van Imhoff)	4

Team	Final
United States (Langley)	2
Switzerland (Schlapbach)	8

Team	Final
Sweden (Högström)	4
Canada (Seitz)	6

Team	Final
Scotland (Caird)	5
Norway (Jøtun Bakke)	8

=== Draw 2 ===
Team	Final
Switzerland (Schlapbach)	8
Scotland (Caird)	7

Team	Final
Germany (Hege)	6
Denmark (Jørgensen)	9

Team	Final
Netherlands (van Imhoff)	2
Sweden (Högström)	9

Team	Final
Norway (Jøtun Bakke)	7
United States (Langley)	5

Team	Final
Canada (Seitz)	9
Italy (Constantini)	8

=== Draw 3 ===
Team	Final
Italy (Constantini)	4
Norway (Jøtun Bakke)	10

Team	Final
Netherlands (van Imhoff)	1
Canada (Seitz)	10

Team	Final
Denmark (Jørgensen)	5
Switzerland (Schlapbach)	4

Team	Final
Scotland (Caird)	6
Germany (Hege)	8

Team	Final
United States (Langley)	5
Sweden (Högström)	7

=== Draw 4 ===
Team	Final
Netherlands (van Imhoff)	2
Norway (Jøtun Bakke)	12

Team	Final
Sweden (Högström)	8
Germany (Hege)	1

Team	Final
United States (Langley)	6
Italy (Constantini)	13

Team	Final
Canada (Seitz)	7
Switzerland (Schlapbach)	9

Team	Final
Denmark (Jørgensen)	5
Scotland (Caird)	6

=== Draw 5 ===
Team	Final
United States (Langley)	5
Scotland (Caird)	6

Team	Final
Italy (Constantini)	4
Sweden (Högström)	8

Team	Final
Norway (Jøtun Bakke)	6
Canada (Seitz)	8

Team	Final
Denmark (Jørgensen)	10
Netherlands (van Imhoff)	4

Team	Final
Switzerland (Schlapbach)	9
Germany (Hege)	4

=== Draw 6 ===
Team	Final
Canada (Seitz)	7
Denmark (Jørgensen)	3

Team	Final
Netherlands (van Imhoff)	5
United States (Langley)	8

Team	Final
Switzerland (Schlapbach)	7
Norway (Jøtun Bakke)	8

Team	Final
Scotland (Caird)	6
Sweden (Högström)	11

Team	Final
Germany (Hege)	9
Italy (Constantini)	10

=== Draw 7 ===
Team	Final
Switzerland (Schlapbach)	5
Sweden (Högström)	7

Team	Final
Scotland (Caird)	3
Canada (Seitz)	8

Team	Final
Germany (Hege)	6
United States (Langley)	8

Team	Final
Norway (Jøtun Bakke)	5
Denmark (Jørgensen)	4

Team	Final
Italy (Constantini)	11
Netherlands (van Imhoff)	2

=== Draw 8 ===
Team	Final
Norway (Jøtun Bakke)	9
Germany (Hege)	8

Team	Final
Sweden (Högström)	8
Denmark (Jørgensen)	3

Team	Final
Italy (Constantini)	5
Scotland (Caird)	11

Team	Final
Switzerland (Schlapbach)	13
Netherlands (van Imhoff)	2

Team	Final
Canada (Seitz)	9
United States (Langley)	2

=== Draw 9 ===
Team	Final
Netherlands (van Imhoff)	6
Scotland (Caird)	11

Team	Final
Italy (Constantini)	4
Switzerland (Schlapbach)	12

Team	Final
Sweden (Högström)	12
Norway (Jøtun Bakke)	4

Team	Final
Germany (Hege)	4
Canada (Seitz)	5

Team	Final
Denmark (Jørgensen)	7
United States (Langley)	6

== Playoffs ==
Semifinals
1	Canada	7
4	Switzerland	6
2	Sweden	4
3	Norway	2

Final
1	Canada	2
2	Sweden	7

=== Semifinals ===
Team	Final
Canada (Seitz)	7
Switzerland (Schlapbach)	6

Team	Final
Sweden (Högström)	4
Norway (Jøtun Bakke)	2

=== Final ===
Team	Final
Canada (Seitz)	2
Sweden (Högström)	7

1981 Royal Bank of Scotland World Women's Curling Championship
(Sweden)
Sweden
1st title
