= Elisabeth Skogen =

Norwegian female curler

- Curler ♀

Team
- Curling club: Oslo CC, Oslo

Curling career
- Member Association: Norway
- World Championship: 1 (1981)
Medal record
Curling
World Championships
Bronze medal – third place	1981 Perth
Norwegian Women's Championship
Gold medal – first place	1981

Elisabeth Skogen is a former Norwegian curler.

She is a 1981 World women's bronze medallist.

== Teams ==
Season	Skip	Third	Second	Lead	Events
1980–81	Anne Jøtun Bakke	Bente Hoel	Elisabeth Skogen	Hilde Jøtun	NWCC 1981 (gold); WCC 1981 (bronze)
