= Jette Olsen =

Danish female curler and coach

- Curler ♀

Team
- Curling club: Hvidovre CC, Hvidovre

Curling career
- Member Association: Denmark
- World Championship: 2 (1982, 1985, 1986, 1987)
- European Championship: 2 (1983, 1984)
- Other appearances: European Junior Championships: 1 (1983)
Medal record
Curling
World Championships
Gold medal – first place	1982 Perth
Danish Women's Championship
Gold medal – first place	1985
Gold medal – first place	1986
Gold medal – first place	1987

Jette Olsen is a Danish curler and curling coach.

She is a 1982 World women's champion.

== Teams ==
Season	Skip	Third	Second	Lead	Events
1981–82	Helena Blach (fourth)	Marianne Jørgensen (skip)	Astrid Birnbaum	Jette Olsen	WCC 1982 (gold)
1982–83	Helena Blach	Jette Olsen	Malene Krause	Lone Kristoffersen	DJCC 1983 (gold); EJCC 1983 (gold)
1983–84	Helena Blach	Jette Olsen	Malene Krause	Lone Kristoffersen	ECC 1983 (8th)
1984–85	Helena Blach	Jette Olsen	Malene Krause	Lone Kristoffersen	ECC 1984 (5th); DWCC 1985 (gold); WCC 1985 (6th)
1985–86	Helena Blach	Jette Olsen	Malene Krause	Lone Kristoffersen	DWCC 1986 (gold); WCC 1986 (8th)
1986–87	Jette Olsen (fourth)	Helena Blach (skip)	Malene Krause	Lone Kristoffersen	DWCC 1987 (gold); WCC 1987 (7th)

== Record as a coach of national teams ==
Year	Tournament, event	National team	Place
2018	2018 Winter Olympics	Denmark (women)	10
