= Marie Henriksson =

Swedish female curler (born 1955)

- Curler ♀
- Born: 17 June 1955 (age 71)

Team
- Curling club: Karlstads CK, Karlstad

Curling career
- Member Association: Sweden
- European Championship: 1 (1988)
- Olympic: 1 (1988) (demo)
- Other appearances: World Senior Championships: 1 (2017)
Medal record
Curling
European Championships
| Gold medal – first place | 1988 Perth |
Swedish Women's Championship
| Gold medal – first place | 1988 |

Marie Henriksson (born 17 June 1955) is a Swedish female curler and curling coach.

She is a 1988 European champion.

She competed at the 1988 Winter Olympics when curling was a demonstration sport.

In 1988 she was inducted into the Swedish Curling Hall of Fame.

== Teams ==
=== Women's ===
| Season | Skip | Third | Second | Lead | Alternate | Events |
|---|---|---|---|---|---|---|
| 1987–88 | Elisabeth Högström | Monika Jansson | Birgitta Sewik | Marie Henriksson | Anette Norberg (OG) | OG 1988 (demo) (silver); SWCC 1988 (gold) |
| 1987–88 | Elisabeth Högström | Anette Norberg | Monika Jansson | Marie Henriksson | | ECC 1988 (gold) |
| 2016–17 | Marie Henriksson | Carina Bjork | Birgitta Sewik | Helena Eriksson | | WSCC 2017 (10th) |

=== Mixed ===
| Season | Skip | Third | Second | Lead | Events |
|---|---|---|---|---|---|
| 1978 | Göran Roxin | Ulrika Åkerberg | Claes Roxin | Marie Henriksson | SMxCC 1978 (gold) |
| 1979 | Göran Roxin | Ulrika Åkerberg | Claes Roxin | Marie Henriksson | SMxCC 1979 (gold) |
| 1980 | Göran Roxin | Ulrika Åkerberg | Claes Roxin | Marie Henriksson | SMxCC 1980 (gold) |
| 1985 | Axel Kamp | Gertrud Kamp | Göran Roxin | Marie Henriksson | SMxCC 1985 (gold) |

== Record as a coach of national teams ==
| Year | Tournament, event | National team | Place |
|---|---|---|---|
| 2007 | 2007 European Curling Championships | Sweden (men) | 6 |
