= Carina Olsson =

Swedish female curler

- Curler ♀
- Other names: Carina Björk
- Born: 26 August 1955 (age 71)

Team
- Curling club: Karlstads CK, Karlstad

Curling career
- Member Association: Sweden
- World Championship: 2 (1980, 1981)
- European Championship: 1 (1980)
- Other appearances: World Senior Championships: 1 (2017)
Medal record
Curling
World championships
Gold medal – first place	1981 Perth
Silver medal – second place	1980 Perth
European Championships
Gold medal – first place	1980 Copenhagen
Swedish Women's Championship
Gold medal – first place	1980
Gold medal – first place	1981

Carina Olsson (born 26 August 1955; in marriage also known as Carina Björk) is a Swedish female curler.

She is a 1981 World champion and a 1980 European champion.

In 2018 she was inducted into the Swedish Curling Hall of Fame.

== Teams ==
Season	Skip	Third	Second	Lead	Events
1975–76	Marie Pettersson	Carina Olsson	Annika Nerman	Vivi Richter	SJCC 1976 (gold)
1979–80	Elisabeth Högström	Carina Olsson	Birgitta Sewik	Karin Sjögren	SWCC 1980 (gold); WCC 1980 (silver)
1980–81	Elisabeth Högström	Carina Olsson	Birgitta Sewik	Karin Sjögren	ECC 1980 (gold); SWCC 1981 (gold); WCC 1981 (gold)
2016–17	Marie Henriksson	Carina Bjork	Birgitta Sewik	Helena Eriksson	WSCC 2017 (10th)
