= 1980 European Curling Championships =

- Host city: Copenhagen, Denmark
- Arena: Hvidovre Ice Rink
- Dates: 30 November – 6 December
- Men's winner: Scotland
- Curling club: Aberdeen CC, Aberdeen
- Skip: Barton Henderson
- Third: Greig Henderson
- Second: Bill Henderson
- Lead: Alistair Sinclair
- Finalist: Norway (Kristian Sørum)
- Women's winner: Sweden
- Curling club: Karlstads CK, Karlstad
- Skip: Elisabeth Högström
- Third: Carina Olsson
- Second: Birgitta Sewik
- Lead: Karin Sjögren
- Finalist: Norway (Ellen Githmark)

The 1980 European Curling Championships were held from 30 November to 6 December at the Hvidovre Ice Rink arena in Copenhagen, Denmark.

The Scottish men's team skipped by Barton Henderson won their second European title, and the Swedish women's team skipped by Elisabeth Högström won their fourth European title.

For the first time, the men's team of Luxembourg and women's teams of Netherlands and Whales took part in the European Championship.

== Men's ==
=== Teams ===
Team	Skip	Third	Second	Lead	Curling club
Denmark	Per Berg	Gert Larsen	Jan Hansen	Michael Harry	Hvidovre CC, Hvidovre
England	Alan Forrest	Malcolm Maxwell	Stephen Shell	Geoff Logan	
France	Claude Feige	Marc Sibuet	Gilles Marin-Pache	Claude Marin-Pache	
Germany	Manfred Schulze	Balint von Bery	Manfred Rösgen	Ralph Hubner	
Italy	Dino Zardini	Dino Menardi	Valerio Constantini	Cesar Maioni	
Luxembourg	Nico Schweich	William Bannerman	Guy Schweich	Gisbert Franz	
Netherlands	Otto Veening	Robert van der Cammen	Jeroen Tilman	Wim Neeleman	
Norway	Kristian Sørum	Eigil Ramsfjell	Gunnar Meland	Dagfinn Loen	Bygdøy CC, Oslo
Scotland	Barton Henderson	Greig Henderson	Bill Henderson	Alistair Sinclair	Aberdeen CC, Aberdeen
Sweden	Anders Eriksson	Lars Eriksson	Ulf Sundström	Håkan Svernell	Norrköpings CK, Norrköping
Switzerland	Markus Etienne	Rolf Bättig	Thomas Greter	Mark Zeugin	
Wales	Keith Preston (fourth)	Gordon Vickers	Peter Williams	John Hunt (skip)	

=== Round robin ===
	Team	A1	A2	A3	A4	A5	A6	A7	A8	A9	A10	A11	A12	W	L	Place
A1	Denmark	*	11:6	4:5	5:2	13:3	9:4	14:4	5:8	3:5	3:7	5:7	7:4	6	5	6
A2	England	6:11	*	3:6	3:11	10:12	5:14	3:9	3:11	5:8	3:12	4:12	3:12	0	11	12
A3	France	5:4	6:3	*	8:7	4:9	9:6	8:5	5:10	9:5	4:7	9:6	12:4	8	3	3
A4	Germany	2:5	11:3	7:8	*	8:9	10:3	10:6	5:8	3:6	11:3	5:9	10:4	4	7	8
A5	Italy	3:13	12:10	9:4	9:8	*	14:7	8:6	L	4:10	5:11	2:8	9:6	6	5	7
A6	Luxembourg	4:9	14:5	6:9	3:10	7:14	*	7:9	3:14	4:12	3:13	6:7	10:6	2	9	10
A7	Netherlands	4:14	9:3	5:8	6:10	6:8	9:7	*	2:13	5:11	5:8	5:8	10:7	3	8	9
A8	Norway	8:5	11:3	10:5	8:5	W	14:3	13:2	*	7:6	8:6	8:2	12:5	11	0	1
A9	Scotland	5:3	8:5	5:9	6:3	10:4	12:4	11:5	6:7	*	9:8	6:4	8:9	8	3	3
A10	Sweden	7:3	12:3	7:4	3:11	11:5	13:3	8:5	6:8	8:9	*	6:3	16:6	9	2	2
A11	Switzerland	7:5	12:4	6:9	9:5	8:2	7:6	8:5	2:8	4:6	3:6	*	10:3	7	4	5
A12	Wales	4:7	12:3	4:12	4:10	6:9	6:10	7:10	5:12	9:8	6:16	3:10	*	2	9	11

Team to playoffs (final)
Team to playoffs (semifinal)
Teams to tiebreaker

==== Tiebreaker ====
.
Scotland	7
France	3

=== Playoffs ===
Semifinal			Final
			1	Norway	4
2	Sweden	3		Scotland	6
3	Scotland	7

=== Final standings ===
Place	Team	Skip	GP	W	L
1st place, gold medalist(s)	Scotland	Barton Henderson	14	11	3
2nd place, silver medalist(s)	Norway	Kristian Sørum	12	11	1
3rd place, bronze medalist(s)	Sweden	Anders Eriksson	12	9	3
4	France	Claude Feige	12	8	4
5	Switzerland	Markus Etienne	11	7	4
6	Denmark	Per Berg	11	6	5
7	Italy	Dino Zardini	11	8	3
8	Germany	Manfred Schulze	11	4	7
9	Netherlands	Otto Veening	11	3	8
10	Luxembourg	Nico Schweich	11	2	9
11	Wales	John Hunt	11	2	9
12	England	Alan Forrest	11	0	11

== Women's ==
=== Teams ===
Team	Skip	Third	Second	Lead	Curling club
Denmark	Helena Blach	Marianne Jørgensen	Astrid Birnbaum	Malene Krause	Hvidovre CC, Hvidovre
England	Gwen French	Jean Picken	June Henry	Lynda Clegg	
France	Martine Drewnowski	Josiane Chambard	Martine Dromard	Anne-Claude Wolfers	
Germany	Andrea Schöpp	Elinore Schöpp	Anneliese Diemer	Monika Wagner	
Italy	Maria-Grazzia Constantini	Ann Lacedelli	Tea Valt	Marina Pavani	
Netherlands	Laura Van Imhoff	Hermance van den Houten	Annemie de Jongh	Hanneke Veening	
Norway	Ellen Githmark	Trine Trulsen	Ingvill Githmark	Kirsten Vaule	
Scotland	Betty Law	Bea Sinclair	Jane Sanderson	Carol Hamilton	
Sweden	Elisabeth Högström	Carina Olsson	Birgitta Sewik	Karin Sjögren	Karlstads CK, Karlstad
Switzerland	Gaby Charrière	Jaqueline Landolt	Marianne Uhlmann	Cécilie Blanvillian	Lausanne CC, Lausanne
Wales	Jean King	Margaret Crawley	Heather Rees	Doris Vickers	

=== Round robin ===
	Team	A1	A2	A3	A4	A5	A6	A7	A8	A9	A10	A11	W	L	Place
A1	Denmark	*	12:4	8:7	3:12	13:4	6:11	1:11	1:14	8:7	9:7	15:1	6	4	5
A2	England	4:12	*	7:8	8:9	5:18	5:9	5:11	6:17	2:19	4:15	6:13	0	10	11
A3	France	7:8	8:7	*	5:14	3:9	8:5	2:13	6:11	4:11	3:10	9:7	3	7	9
A4	Germany	12:3	9:8	14:5	*	9:7	13:3	7:9	8:6	3:15	5:4	15:2	8	2	2
A5	Italy	4:13	18:5	9:3	7:9	*	10:6	8:10	4:10	8:9	8:10	12:5	4	6	7
A6	Netherlands	11:6	9:5	5:8	3:13	6:10	*	5:8	3:12	1:12	10:6	13:2	4	6	8
A7	Norway	11:1	11:5	13:2	9:7	10:8	8:5	*	6:8	4:7	5:6	17:4	7	3	4
A8	Scotland	14:1	17:6	11:6	6:8	10:4	12:3	8:6	*	4:13	10:6	12:2	8	2	3
A9	Sweden	7:8	19:2	11:4	15:3	9:8	12:1	7:4	13:4	*	11:3	14:3	9	1	1
A10	Switzerland	7:9	15:4	10:3	4:5	10:8	6:10	6:5	6:10	3:11	*	17:1	5	5	6
A11	Wales	1:15	13:6	7:9	2:15	5:12	2:13	4:17	2:12	3:14	1:17	*	1	9	10

Teams to playoffs

=== Playoffs ===
Semifinals
1	Sweden	5
2	Germany	3
3	Scotland	8
4	Norway	11

Final
1	Sweden	10
4	Norway	9

=== Final standings ===
Place	Team	Skip	GP	W	L
1st place, gold medalist(s)	Sweden	Elisabeth Högström	12	11	1
2nd place, silver medalist(s)	Norway	Ellen Githmark	12	8	4
3rd place, bronze medalist(s)	Germany	Andrea Schöpp	11	8	3
3rd place, bronze medalist(s)	Scotland	Betty Law	11	8	3
5	Denmark	Helena Blach	10	6	4
6	Switzerland	Gaby Charrière	10	5	5
7	Italy	Maria-Grazzia Constantini	10	4	6
8	Netherlands	Laura Van Imhoff	10	4	6
9	France	Martine Drewnowski	10	3	7
10	Wales	Jean King	10	1	9
11	England	Gwen French	10	0	10
