= Bente Hoel =

Norwegian female curler

- Curler ♀

Team
- Curling club: Oslo CC, Oslo

Curling career
- Member Association: Norway
- World Championship: 1 (1981)
- European Championship: 3 (1975, 1977, 1978)
Medal record
Curling
World Championships
Bronze medal – third place	1981 Perth
Norwegian Women's Championship
Gold medal – first place	1981

Bente Hoel is a former Norwegian curler.

She is a 1981 World women's bronze medallist.

== Teams ==
Season	Skip	Third	Second	Lead	Events
1975–76	Herborg Pettersen (fourth)	Bente Hoel	Åse Wilhelmsen	Anne Sofie Bjaanaes (skip)	ECC 1975 (5th)
1977–78	Bente Hoel (fourth)	Herborg Pettersen	Åse Wilhelmsen	Anne Sofie Bjaanaes (skip)	ECC 1977 (6th)
1978–79	Bente Hoel	Herborg Pettersen	Maria Löfroth-Christensen	Åse Wilhelmsen	ECC 1978 (7th)
1980–81	Anne Jøtun Bakke	Bente Hoel	Elisabeth Skogen	Hilde Jøtun	NWCC 1981 (gold); WCC 1981 (bronze)
