= Hilde Jøtun =

Norwegian curler

- Curler ♀
- Born: 7 July 1958 (age 68); Oslo, Norway

Team
- Curling club: Oslo CC, Oslo, Snarøyen CC, Oslo

Curling career
- Member Association: Norway
- World Championship: 4 (1981, 1986, 1987, 1988)
- European Championship: 1 (1984)
Medal record
Curling
World Championships
Bronze medal – third place	1981 Perth
Norwegian Women's Championship
Gold medal – first place	1981
Gold medal – first place	1986
Gold medal – first place	1987
Gold medal – first place	1988

Hilde Jøtun Bråthen (born 7 July 1958 in Oslo) is a former Norwegian curler.

She is a 1981 World women's bronze medallist.

== Teams ==
Season	Skip	Third	Second	Lead	Events
1980–81	Anne Jøtun Bakke	Bente Hoel	Elisabeth Skogen	Hilde Jøtun	NWCC 1981 (gold); WCC 1981 (bronze)
1984–85	Anne Jøtun Bakke	Hilde Jøtun	Rikke Ramsfjell	Billie Skjerpen	ECC 1984 (9th)
1985–86	Anne Jøtun Bakke	Hilde Jøtun	Trine Trulsen	Billie Skjerpen	NWCC 1986 (gold); WCC 1986 (5th)
1986–87	Anne Jøtun Bakke	Hilde Jøtun	Ingvill Githmark	Billie Sørum	NWCC 1987 (gold); WCC 1987 (4th)
1987–88	Anne Jøtun Bakke	Hilde Jøtun	Ingvill Githmark	Billie Sørum	NWCC 1988 (gold); WCC 1988 (4th)
