= Birgitta Sewik =

Swedish female curler (born 1949)

- Curler ♀
- Born: 13 January 1949 (age 77)

Team
- Curling club: Karlstads CK, Karlstad

Curling career
- Member Association: Sweden
- World Championship: 4 (1980, 1981, 1982, 1987)
- European Championship: 5 (1980, 1981, 1982, 1983, 1986)
- Olympic: 1 (1988) (demo)
- Other appearances: World Senior Championships: 1 (2017)
Medal record
Curling
World championships
| Gold medal – first place | 1981 Perth |
| Silver medal – second place | 1980 Perth |
| Silver medal – second place | 1982 Geneva |
European Championships
| Gold medal – first place | 1980 Copenhagen |
| Gold medal – first place | 1982 Kirkcaldy |
| Gold medal – first place | 1983 Västerås |
| Silver medal – second place | 1981 Grindelwald |
Swedish Women's Championship
| Gold medal – first place | 1980 |
| Gold medal – first place | 1981 |
| Gold medal – first place | 1982 |
| Gold medal – first place | 1986 |
| Gold medal – first place | 1988 |

Gun-britt Birgitta Sewik (born 13 January 1949) is a Swedish female curler.

She is a 1981 World champion and a three-time European champion (1980, 1982, 1983).

She competed at the 1988 Winter Olympics when curling was a demonstration sport.

In 1982 she was inducted into the Swedish Curling Hall of Fame.

== Teams ==
=== Women's ===
| Season | Skip | Third | Second | Lead | Alternate | Events |
|---|---|---|---|---|---|---|
| 1979–80 | Elisabeth Högström | Carina Olsson | Birgitta Sewik | Karin Sjögren | | SWCC 1980 (gold); WCC 1980 (silver) |
| 1980–81 | Elisabeth Högström | Carina Olsson | Birgitta Sewik | Karin Sjögren | | ECC 1980 (gold); SWCC 1981 (gold); WCC 1981 (gold) |
| 1981–82 | Elisabeth Högström | Katarina Hultling | Birgitta Sewik | Karin Sjögren | | ECC 1981 (silver); SWCC 1982 (gold); WCC 1982 (silver) |
| 1982–83 | Elisabeth Högström | Katarina Hultling | Birgitta Sewik | Karin Sjögren | | ECC 1982 (gold) |
| 1983–84 | Elisabeth Högström | Katarina Hultling | Birgitta Sewik | Karin Sjögren | | ECC 1983 (gold) |
| 1985–86 | Elisabeth Högström | Birgitta Sewik | Eva Andersson | Bitte Berg | | SWCC 1986 (gold) |
| 1986–87 | Elisabeth Högström | Birgitta Sewik | Eva Andersson | Bitte Berg | Inga Arfwidsson (WCC) | ECC 1986 (7th); WCC 1987 (6th) |
| 1987–88 | Elisabeth Högström | Monika Jansson | Birgitta Sewik | Marie Henriksson | Anette Norberg (OG) | OG 1988 (demo) (silver); SWCC 1988 (gold) |
| 2016–17 | Marie Henriksson | Carina Bjork | Birgitta Sewik | Helena Eriksson | | WSCC 2017 (10th) |

=== Mixed ===
| Season | Skip | Third | Second | Lead | Events |
|---|---|---|---|---|---|
| 1982 | Pelle Lindeman | Katarina Hultling | Håkan Ståhlbro | Birgitta Sewik | SMxCC 1982 (gold) |
