= Astrid Birnbaum =

Danish curler

- Curler ♀

Team
- Curling club: Hvidovre CC, Hvidovre, Gentofte CC, Copenhagen

Curling career
- Member Association: Denmark
- World Championship: 5 (1979, 1980, 1981, 1982, 1989)
- European Championship: 4 (1980, 1981, 1987, 1988)
Medal record
Curling
World Championships
Gold medal – first place	1982 Perth
European Championships
Bronze medal – third place	1981 Grindelwald
Danish Women's Championship
Gold medal – first place	1979
Gold medal – first place	1980
Gold medal – first place	1981
Gold medal – first place	1982
Gold medal – first place	1989

Astrid Birnbaum is a Danish curler.

She is a 1982 World women's champion.

== Teams ==
=== Women's ===
Season	Skip	Third	Second	Lead	Events
1978–79	Iben Larsen	Astrid Birnbaum	Marianne Jørgensen	Helena Blach	DWCC 1979 (gold); WCC 1979 (7th)
1979–80	Helena Blach	Marianne Jørgensen	Astrid Birnbaum	Malene Krause	DWCC 1980 (gold); WCC 1980 (10th)
1980–81	Helena Blach	Marianne Jørgensen	Astrid Birnbaum	Malene Krause	DWCC 1981 (gold); WCC 1981 (5th)
1981–82	Helena Blach	Marianne Jørgensen	Astrid Birnbaum	Jette Olsen	DWCC 1982 (gold); WCC 1982 (gold)
1987–88	Marianne Qvist	Lene Bidstrup	Astrid Birnbaum	Lilian Frøhling	ECC 1987 (9th)
1988–89	Marianne Qvist	Lene Bidstrup	Astrid Birnbaum	Lilian Frøhling	DWCC 1989 (gold); WCC 1989 (8th)

=== Mixed ===
Season	Skip	Third	Second	Lead	Events
1986	John Kjærulff	Astrid Birnbaum	Steen Hansen	Lone Kristoffersen	DMxCC 1986 (gold)
