= Weening =

Weening is a surname. Notable people with the surname or a variant of it include:

- Elisabeth Veening, Dutch curler
- Pieter Weening (born 1981), Dutch cyclist
- Wayne Weening (born 1965), Australian darts player

== See also ==
- Weaning, a diet process to give an infant human or another mammal other kinds of suitable food while withdrawing mother's milk
- In medicine, weaning is the term used when the medical team is trying to encourage a patient on cardiopulmonary bypass or a mechanical ventilator, or some other less-invasive assistive device, to breathe on their own, unaided, which can take some time and may not always work.
