= 1988 World Women's Curling Championship =

- Host city: Glasgow, Scotland
- Arena: The Summit Centre
- Dates: 2–10 April 1988
- Winner: Germany
- Curling club: SC Riessersee, Garmisch-Partenkirchen
- Skip: Andrea Schöpp
- Third: Almut Hege-Schöll
- Second: Monika Wagner
- Lead: Suzanne Fink
- Finalist: Canada (Heather Houston)

The 1988 World Women's Curling Championship was held in Glasgow, Scotland from 2–10 April 1988.

West Germany, skipped by Andrea Schöpp defeated Canada in the final to claim Germany's first ever women's world championship in curling.

== Teams ==
Canada	Denmark	Finland	France	Germany
Thunder Bay CC, Thunder Bay, Ontario Skip: Heather Houston; Third: Lorraine Lang; Second: Diane Adams; Lead: Tracy Kennedy	Hvidovre CC Fourth: Helena Blach; Third: Malene Krause; Skip: Lone Kristoffersen; Lead: Lene Nielsen	Hyvinkää CC Skip: Anne Eerikäinen; Third: Mari Lundén; Second: Tytti Haapasaari; Lead: Terhi Liukkonen	Megève CC Skip: Annick Mercier; Third: Agnes Mercier; Second: Andrée Dupont-Roc; Lead: Catherine Lefebvre	SC Riessersee, Garmisch-Partenkirchen Skip: Andrea Schöpp; Third: Almut Hege-Schöll; Second: Monika Wagner; Lead: Suzanne Fink
Norway	Scotland	Sweden	Switzerland	United States
Snarøen CC, Oslo Skip: Anne Jøtun Bakke; Third: Hilde Jøtun; Second: Ingvill Githmark; Lead: Billie Sørum	Lanarkshire Ice Rink, Hamilton Skip: Christine Allison**; Third: Margaret Scott; Second: Kimmie Brown; Lead: Sheena Drummie	Härnösands CK Skip: Anette Norberg; Third: Anna Rindeskog; Second: Sofie Marmont; Lead: Louise Marmont; Alternate: Helena Klange	Wetzikon CC Skip: Erika Müller; Third: Brigitte Kienast; Second: Susanne Luchsinger; Lead: Regula Rüegg	Granite CC, Seattle, Washington Skip: Nancy Langley; Third: Nancy Pearson; Second: Leslie Frosch; Lead: Mary Hobson

== Round robin standings ==
Country	Skip	W	L
Germany	Andrea Schöpp	7	2
Canada	Heather Houston	6	3
Sweden	Anette Norberg	6	3
Norway	Anne Jøtun Bakke	6	3
Denmark	Helena Blach	5	4
Switzerland	Erika Müller	5	4
United States	Nancy Langley	4	5
France	Annick Mercier	3	6
Scotland	Christine Allison	3	6
Finland	Anne Eerikäinen	0	9

== Round robin results ==
=== Draw 1 ===
Team	Final
Denmark (Blach)	9
Switzerland (Müller)	1

Team	Final
United States (Langley)	7
France (Mercier)	3

Team	Final
Scotland (Allison)	6
Canada (Houston)	5

Team	Final
Germany (Schöpp)	9
Finland (Eerikäinen)	7

Team	Final
Sweden (Norberg)	6
Norway (Jøtun Bakke)	4

=== Draw 2 ===
Team	Final
Denmark (Blach)	9
Finland (Eerikäinen)	3

Team	Final
Canada (Houston)	11
Switzerland (Müller)	0

Team	Final
Norway (Jøtun Bakke)	9
United States (Langley)	5

Team	Final
Sweden (Norberg)	10
Scotland (Allison)	8

Team	Final
Germany (Schöpp)	6
France (Mercier)	5

=== Draw 3 ===
Team	Final
Switzerland (Müller)	12
France (Mercier)	7

Team	Final
Sweden (Norberg)	11
United States (Langley)	1

Team	Final
Germany (Schöpp)	7
Denmark (Blach)	5

Team	Final
Canada (Houston)	7
Norway (Jøtun Bakke)	1

Team	Final
Scotland (Allison)	13
Finland (Eerikäinen)	6

=== Draw 4 ===
Team	Final
Canada (Houston)	8
United States (Langley)	6

Team	Final
France (Mercier)	6
Denmark (Blach)	5

Team	Final
Switzerland (Müller)	9
Finland (Eerikäinen)	8

Team	Final
Norway (Jøtun Bakke)	9
Scotland (Allison)	3

Team	Final
Germany (Schöpp)	10
Sweden (Norberg)	8

=== Draw 5 ===
Team	Final
Norway (Jøtun Bakke)	9
Switzerland (Müller)	1

Team	Final
United States (Langley)	15
Finland (Eerikäinen)	1

Team	Final
Sweden (Norberg)	7
France (Mercier)	5

Team	Final
Germany (Schöpp)	8
Canada (Houston)	4

Team	Final
Denmark (Blach)	8
Scotland (Allison)	4

=== Draw 6 ===
Team	Final
Sweden (Norberg)	8
Denmark (Blach)	2

Team	Final
Germany (Schöpp)	12
Scotland (Allison)	3

Team	Final
Canada (Houston)	11
Finland (Eerikäinen)	2

Team	Final
Norway (Jøtun Bakke)	7
France (Mercier)	2

Team	Final
Switzerland (Müller)	7
United States (Langley)	6

=== Draw 7 ===
Team	Final
France (Mercier)	6
Scotland (Allison)	5

Team	Final
Denmark (Blach)	6
Canada (Houston)	5

Team	Final
United States (Langley)	7
Germany (Schöpp)	4

Team	Final
Switzerland (Müller)	8
Sweden (Norberg)	3

Team	Final
Norway (Jøtun Bakke)	10
Finland (Eerikäinen)	5

=== Draw 8 ===
Team	Final
Norway (Jøtun Bakke)	10
Germany (Schöpp)	4

Team	Final
Sweden (Norberg)	7
Finland (Eerikäinen)	0

Team	Final
Switzerland (Müller)	8
Scotland (Allison)	7

Team	Final
United States (Langley)	6
Denmark (Blach)	5

Team	Final
Canada (Houston)	9
France (Mercier)	4

=== Draw 9 ===
Team	Final
Canada (Houston)	10
Sweden (Norberg)	2

Team	Final
Germany (Schöpp)	9
Switzerland (Müller)	6

Team	Final
Denmark (Blach)	13
Norway (Jøtun Bakke)	6

Team	Final
France (Mercier)	9
Finland (Eerikäinen)	5

Team	Final
Scotland (Allison)	10
United States (Langley)	3

== Playoffs ==
Semifinal
1	Germany	9
4	Norway	2
2	Canada	10
3	Sweden	4

Gold-medal game
1	Germany	9
2	Canada	3
Bronze-medal game
3	Sweden	14
4	Norway	2

=== Semifinals ===
Team	Final
Norway (Jøtun Bakke)	2
Germany (Schöpp)	9

Team	Final
Canada (Houston)	10
Sweden (Norberg)	4

=== Bronze-medal game ===
Team	Final
Sweden (Norberg)	14
Norway (Jøtun Bakke)	2

=== Gold-medal game ===
Team	Final
Germany (Schöpp)	9
Canada (Houston)	3

1988 World Women's Curling Championship Winner
(Germany)
Germany
1st title
