= Monika Jansson =

Swedish curler

- Curler ♀
- Born: 27 February 1960 (age 66)

Team
- Curling club: Karlstads CK, Karlstad

Curling career
- Member Association: Sweden
- European Championship: 1 (1988)
- Olympic: 1 (1992) (demo)
Medal record
Curling
European Championships
Gold medal – first place	1988 Perth
Swedish Women's Championship
Gold medal – first place	1988

Monika Jansson (born 27 February 1960) is a Swedish female curler.

She was a member of the 1988 European championship team.

She competed at the 1988 Winter Olympics when curling was a demonstration sport.

== Teams ==
Season	Skip	Third	Second	Lead	Alternate	Events
1987–88	Elisabeth Högström	Monika Jansson	Birgitta Sewik	Marie Henriksson	Anette Norberg (OG)	OG 1988 (demo) (silver); SWCC 1988 (gold)
1987–88	Elisabeth Högström	Anette Norberg	Monika Jansson	Marie Henriksson		ECC 1988 (gold)
