= Marianne Uhlmann =

Swiss female curler

- Curler ♀

Team
- Curling club: CC Lausanne Olympique, Lausanne

Curling career
- Member Association: Switzerland
- World Championship: 1 (1980)
- European Championship: 2 (1980, 1985)
Medal record
Curling
European Championships
Gold medal – first place	1985 Grindelwald
Swiss Women's Championship
Gold medal – first place	1980

Marianne Uhlmann is a former Swiss female curler. She played second position on the Swiss rink that won the 1985 European Championships.

== Teams ==
Season	Skip	Third	Second	Lead	Events
1979–80	Gaby Charrière	Marie-Louise Favre	Marianne Uhlmann	Cécilie Blanvillian	SWCC 1980 (gold); WCC 1980 (8th)
1980–81	Gaby Charrière	Jaqueline Landolt	Marianne Uhlmann	Cécilie Blanvillian	ECC 1980 (6th)
1985–86	Jaqueline Landolt	Christine Krieg	Marianne Uhlmann	Silvia Benoit	ECC 1985 (gold)
