= Katrin Peterhans =

Swiss curler (born 1962)

- Curler ♀
- Born: 28 March 1962 (age 64)

Team
- Curling club: CC Bern & Bern Egghölzi Damen CC, Bern

Curling career
- Member Association: Switzerland
- World Championship: 2 (1981, 1989)
- European Championship: 4 (1981, 1982, 1987, 1988, 1995)
- Olympic: 1 (1988) (demo)
Medal record
Curling
European Championships
Gold medal – first place	1981 Grindelwald
Bronze medal – third place	1982 Kirkcaldy
Bronze medal – third place	1988 Perth
Swiss Women's Championship
Gold medal – first place	1981 Bern
Gold medal – first place	1989 Engelberg

Katrin Peterhans (born 28 March 1962) is a former Swiss female curler. She played lead position on the Swiss rink that won the 1981 European Championships.

She competed at the 1988 Winter Olympics when curling was a demonstration sport.

== Teams ==
Season	Skip	Third	Second	Lead	Alternate	Coach	Events
1980–81	Susan Schlapbach	Irene Bürgi	Ursula Schlapbach	Katrin Peterhans			SWCC 1981 (gold); WCC 1981 (4th)
1981–82	Susan Schlapbach	Irene Bürgi	Ursula Schlapbach	Katrin Peterhans			ECC 1981 (gold)
1982–83	Susan Schlapbach	Irene Bürgi	Ursula Schlapbach	Katrin Peterhans			ECC 1982 (bronze)
1987–88	Cristina Lestander	Barbara Meier	Christina Gartenmann	Katrin Peterhans			ECC 1987 (5th); OG 1988 (7th)
1988–89	Cristina Lestander	Barbara Meier	Ingrid Thulin	Katrin Peterhans			ECC 1988 (bronze); SWCC 1989 (gold); WCC 1989 (5th)
1995–96	Cristina Lestander	Claudia Bärtschi	Andrea Stöckli	Katrin Peterhans	Jutta Tanner	Heinz Schmid, Erika Müller	ECC 1995 (7th)
