= 1985 European Curling Championships =

- Host city: Grindelwald, Switzerland
- Arena: Sportzentrum
- Dates: 10–14 December
- Men's winner: West Germany
- Skip: Rodger Gustaf Schmidt
- Third: Wolfgang Burba
- Second: Johnny Jahr
- Lead: Hans-Joachim Burba
- Finalist: Sweden (Per Lindeman)
- Women's winner: Switzerland
- Skip: Jaqueline Landolt
- Third: Christine Krieg
- Second: Marianne Uhlmann
- Lead: Silvia Benoit
- Finalist: Scotland (Jeanette Johnston)

The 1985 European Curling Championships were held from 10 to 14 December at the Sportzentrum arena in Grindelwald, Switzerland.

The West German men's team skipped by Rodger Gustaf Schmidt won their first title and the Swiss women's team skipped by Jaqueline Landolt won their third title.

== Men ==
=== Teams ===
Country	Skip	Third	Second	Lead	Alternate	Coach	Curling club, city
Austria	Konrad Weiser	Thomas Wieser	Herwig Ritter	Christian Wieser			
Denmark	Tommy Stjerne	Per Berg	Peter Andersen	Ivan Frederiksen			Hvidovre CC, Hvidovre
England	Bob Martin	Ronnie Brock	Ian Coutts	John Brown			
Finland	Jussi Uusipaavalniemi	Petri Tsutsunen	Markku Uusipaavalniemi	Jarmo Jokivalli	Juhani Heinonen		
France	Dominique Dupont-Roc	Christian Dupont-Roc	Thierry Mercier	Daniel Cosetto			
Italy	Andrea Pavani	Franco Sovilla	Fabio Alverà	Stefano Morona			
Luxembourg	Nico Schweich	Guy Schweich	Georges Schweich	William Bannerman	Paul Bannerman		
Netherlands	Wim Neeleman	Otto Veening	Gérard Verbeek	Jeroen Tilman		Darrell Ell	
Norway	Eigil Ramsfjell	Sjur Loen	Gunnar Meland	Morten Skaug			
Scotland	Billy Howat	Robert Clark	Robert Shaw	Alistair Henry			
Sweden	Connie Östlund (fourth)	Per Lindeman (skip)	Bo Andersson	Göran Åberg			Karlstads CK, Karlstad
Switzerland	Jürg Tanner	Patrick Hürlimann	Patrik Lörtscher	Mario Gross			Lausanne-Riviera CC, Lausanne
Wales	John Hunt	John Stone	John Guyan	Scott Lyon			
West Germany	Rodger Gustaf Schmidt	Wolfgang Burba	Johnny Jahr	Hans-Joachim Burba			

=== First Phase (Triple Knockout) ===
==== Round 1 ====
Two teams promoted to Second Phase

Game 1		Game 2		Game 3
		Switzerland	4
Finland	2	Italy	7
Italy	8			Italy	4
West Germany	9			West Germany	9
Wales	4	West Germany	7
England	15	England	5
Luxembourg	3

Game 1		Game 2		Game 3
		Scotland	6
Sweden	6	Sweden	5
Netherlands	5			Scotland	9
Norway	10			Norway	4
Austria	3	Norway	6
Denmark	8	Denmark	3
France	4

==== Round 2 ====
Three teams promoted to Second Phase

Game 1		Game 2		Game 3
				Norway	10
				Finland	2
		Finland	9
Wales	6	Luxembourg	8
Luxembourg	8

Game 1		Game 2		Game 3
				Italy	4
				Netherlands	5
		Netherlands	6
Austria	2	France	3
France	12

Game 1		Game 2
Switzerland	7
England	1	Switzerland	7
Sweden	6	Denmark	2
Denmark	8

==== Round 3 ====
Three teams promoted to Second Phase

Game 1		Game 2
		Italy	2
Sweden	9	Sweden	8
Wales	1

Game 1		Game 2
		Finland	4
England	7	England	9
Austria	4

Game 1		Game 2
		Denmark	9
Luxembourg	8	Luxembourg	2
France	6

=== Second Phase (Double Knockout) ===
==== Round 1 ====
Two teams promoted to Playoffs

Game 1
West Germany	9
Sweden	1
Norway	8
England	2

Game 2
West Germany	4
Norway	6

Game 1
Switzerland	9
Netherlands	2
Scotland	6
Norway	7

Game 2
Switzerland	5
Denmark	8

==== Round 2 ====
Two teams promoted to Playoffs

Game 1		Game 2
		Switzerland	3
Sweden	9	Sweden	6
England	4

Game 1		Game 2
		West Germany	7
Netherlands	4	Scotland	6
Scotland	5

=== Placement Phase ===
==== Range 9-14 ====
Quarterfinals (9-14)		Semifinals (9-14)		Final for 9th place
		Luxembourg	7
Wales	3	Austria	8
Austria	6			Austria	3
Italy	2			Finland	7
France	8	France	3
		Finland	4

Semifinal (11-14)
Luxembourg	2
Italy	11
France	10
Wales	4

Final for 11th place
Italy	4
France	5
Final for 13th place
Luxembourg	3
Wales	9

==== Range 5-8 ====
Final for 5th place
Switzerland	8
Scotland	7

Final for 7th place
England	5
Netherlands	4

=== Playoffs ===
Semifinals
1	West Germany	9
4	Denmark	7
2	Sweden	8
3	Norway	6

Final
West Germany	7
Sweden	5
Bronze Medal Game
Denmark	4
Norway	5

=== Final standings ===
Place	Country	Skip	Games	Wins	Losses
1st place, gold medalist(s)	West Germany	Rodger Gustaf Schmidt	8	7	1
2nd place, silver medalist(s)	Sweden	Per Lindeman	10	6	4
3rd place, bronze medalist(s)	Norway	Eigil Ramsfjell	8	6	2
4	Denmark	Tommy Stjerne	9	5	4
5	Switzerland	Jürg Tanner	7	4	3
6	Scotland	Billy Howat	6	3	3
7	England	Bob Martin	8	4	4
8	Netherlands	Wim Neeleman	6	2	4
9	Finland	Jussi Uusipaavalniemi	6	3	3
10	Austria	Konrad Weiser	6	2	4
11	France	Dominique Dupont-Roc	8	4	4
12	Italy	Andrea Pavani	8	3	5
13	Wales	John Hunt	6	1	5
14	Luxembourg	Nico Schweich	8	2	6

== Women ==
=== Teams ===
Country	Skip	Third	Second	Lead	Coach	Curling club, city
Austria	Edeltraud Koudelka	Christl Naegle	Ingrid Märker	Veronika Hölzl		
Denmark	Maj-Brit Rejnholdt-Christensen	Jane Bidstrup	Hanne Olsen	Lone Bagge		Hvidovre CC, Hvidovre
England	Margaret Maxwell	Enid Logan	Caroline Cumming	Dorothy Shell		
Finland	Jaana Jokela	Nina Ahvenainen	Taru Kivinen	Kirsi Jeskanen		
France	Paulette Sulpice	Huguette Jullien	Isabelle Quere	Jocelyn Lhenry		
Italy	Maria-Grazzia Constantini	Angela Constantini	Tea Valt	Nella Alvera		
Luxembourg	Cilly Schweich	Madeleine van den Houten	Marie Garritze	Pat Bannerman		
Netherlands	Laura Van Imhoff	Gerrie Veening	Marjorie Querido	Jenny Bovenschen	Darrell Ell	
Norway	Trine Trulsen	Dordi Nordby	Hanne Pettersen	Mette Halvorsen		
Scotland	Jeanette Johnston	Catherine Dodds	Marjorie Kidd	Ella Gallanders		
Sweden	Maud Nordlander (fourth)	Inga Arfwidsson (skip)	Ulrika Åkerberg	Barbro Arfwidsson		Norrköpings CK, Norrköping
Switzerland	Jaqueline Landolt	Christine Krieg	Marianne Uhlmann	Silvia Benoit		
Wales	Jean King	Helen Lyon	Margaret Crawley	Anne Stone		
West Germany	Almut Hege	Petra Tschetsch	Suzanne Fink	Josefine Einsle		

=== First Phase (Triple Knockout) ===
==== Round 1 ====
Two teams promoted to Second Phase

Game 1		Game 2		Game 3
		West Germany	7
England	7	Norway	6
Norway	11			West Germany	8
Italy	1			Denmark	4
Luxembourg	12	Luxembourg	2
Denmark	9	Denmark	11
Netherlands	6

Game 1		Game 2		Game 3
		Sweden	10
Austria	3	Scotland	4
Scotland	4			Sweden	6
Switzerland	10			Switzerland	3
Finland	1	Switzerland	10
France	2	Wales	1
Wales	9

==== Round 2 ====
Three teams promoted to Second Phase

Game 1		Game 2		Game 3
Italy	9
Netherlands	3	Italy	9
		England	6
				Italy	8
				Switzerland	4

Game 1		Game 2		Game 3
				Denmark	7
				Austria	5
		Austria	7
Finland	3	France	4
France	7

Game 1		Game 2
Norway	12
Luxembourg	2	Norway	8
Scotland	11	Scotland	3
Wales	7

==== Round 3 ====
Three teams promoted to Second Phase

Game 1		Game 2
		Scotland	12
Wales	2	Netherlands	3
Netherlands	10

Game 1		Game 2
		Austria	10
Luxembourg	8	Finland	8
Finland	9

Game 1		Game 2
		Switzerland	13
England	4	France	5
France	10

=== Second Phase (Double Knockout) ===
==== Round 1 ====
Two teams promoted to Playoffs

Game 1
West Germany	7
Switzerland	5
Italy	1
Scotland	9

Game 2
West Germany	4
Scotland	6

Game 1
Denmark	6
Norway	5
Sweden	8
Austria	2

Game 2
Denmark	9
Sweden	2

==== Round 2 ====
Two teams promoted to Playoffs

Game 1		Game 2
		Sweden	6
Switzerland	7	Switzerland	7
Italy	5

Game 1		Game 2
		West Germany	2
Norway	14	Norway	9
Austria	4

=== Placement Phase ===
==== Range 9-14 ====
Quarterfinal (9-14)		Semifinals (9-14)		Final for 9th place
		Finland	14
Wales	9	Wales	5
England	8			Finland	8
Netherlands	10			France	5
Luxembourg	3	Netherlands	1
		France	11

Semifinal (11-14)
Wales	5
Luxembourg	8
Netherlands	12
England	1

Final for 11th place
Luxembourg	4
Netherlands	9
Final for 13th place
Wales	1
England	9

==== Range 5-8 ====
Final for 5th place
Sweden	7
West Germany	1

Final for 7th place
Italy	5
Austria	7

=== Playoffs ===
Semifinals
1	Switzerland	9
4	Denmark	3
2	Norway	3
3	Scotland	5

Final
Switzerland	7
Scotland	3
Bronze Medal Game
Denmark	3
Norway	7

=== Final standings ===
Place	Country	Skip	Games	Wins	Losses
1st place, gold medalist(s)	Switzerland	Jaqueline Landolt	10	7	3
2nd place, silver medalist(s)	Scotland	Jeanette Johnston	9	6	3
3rd place, bronze medalist(s)	Norway	Trine Trulsen	9	6	3
4	Denmark	Maj-Brit Rejnholdt-Christensen	8	5	3
5	Sweden	Inga Arfwidsson	7	5	2
6	West Germany	Almut Hege	6	3	3
7	Austria	Edeltraud Koudelka	7	3	4
8	Italy	Maria-Grazzia Constantini	7	3	4
9	Finland	Jaana Jokela	6	3	3
10	France	Paulette Sulpice	7	3	4
11	Netherlands	Laura Van Imhoff	8	4	4
12	Luxembourg	Cilly Schweich	7	2	5
13	England	Margaret Maxwell	6	1	5
14	Wales	Jean King	8	2	6
