= Christine Krieg =

Swiss curler

- Curler ♀

Team
- Curling club: CC Lausanne Olympique, Lausanne

Curling career
- Member Association: Switzerland
- European Championship: 2 (1985, 1990)
Medal record
Curling
European Championships
Gold medal – first place	1985 Grindelwald
Bronze medal – third place	1990 Lillehammer

Christine Krieg is a former Swiss female curler. She played third position on the Swiss rink that won 1985 European Championships.

== Teams ==
=== Women's ===
Season	Skip	Third	Second	Lead	Events
1985–86	Jaqueline Landolt	Christine Krieg	Marianne Uhlmann	Silvia Benoit	ECC 1985 (gold)
1990–91	Cristina Lestander	Christine Krieg	Nicole Oetliker	Christina Gartenmann	ECC 1990 (bronze)

=== Mixed ===
Season	Skip	Third	Second	Lead	Events
1988–89	Stefan Karnusian	Christine Krieg	Traugott Ellenberger	Corina Schindler	SMxCC 1989 (gold)
