= Alistair Sinclair (curler) =

Scottish male curler

- Curler ♂

Team
- Curling club: Aberdeen CC, Aberdeen

Curling career
- Member Association: Scotland
- World Championship: 1 (1980)
- European Championship: 1 (1980)
Medal record
Curling
European Championships
Gold medal – first place	1980 Copenhagen
Scottish Men's Championship
Gold medal – first place	1980

Alistair Sinclair is a Scottish curler. He is a 1980 European champion.

== Teams ==
Season	Skip	Third	Second	Lead	Events
1979–80	Barton Henderson	Greig Henderson	Bill Henderson	Alistair Sinclair	SMCC 1980 (gold); WCC 1980 (8th)
1980–81	Barton Henderson	Greig Henderson	Bill Henderson	Alistair Sinclair	ECC 1980 (gold)
