= Marianne Gartner =

Austrian curler

- Curler ♀

Team
- Curling club: Kitzbühel CC, Kitzbühel

Curling career
- Member Association: Austria
- World Championship: 1 (1983)
- European Championship: 2 (1981, 1982)

Marianne Gartner is an Austrian female curler.

At the national level, she is a two-time Austrian women's champion curler (1982, 1983).

== Teams ==
=== Women's ===
Season	Skip	Third	Second	Lead	Events
1981–82	Marianne Gartner	Antje Karrer	Susanne Wieser	Herta Küchenmeister	ECC 1981 (9th)
1982–83	Herta Küchenmeister	Monika Hölzl	Edeltraud Koudelka	Marianne Gartner	ECC 1982 (8th)
1982–83	Marianne Gartner	Edeltraud Koudelka	Monika Hölzl	Herta Kuchenmeister	WWCC 1983 (10th)
