= Dino Menardi =

Italian ice hockey player and curler

Personal information
- Nationality: Italian
- Born: 23 August 1923; Cortina d'Ampezzo, Italy
- Died: 2 September 2014 (aged 91); Cortina d'Ampezzo, Italy

Sport
- Sport: Ice hockey, Curling

Dino Menardi (23 August 1923 – 2 September 2014) was an Italian ice hockey player. He competed in the men's tournament at the 1948 Winter Olympics. As a curler he competed at the 1980 European Curling Championships.
