= Helen Caird =

Scottish curler

- Curler ♀

Team
- Curling club: Broughty Ferry Ladies CC, Dundee

Curling career
- Member Association: Scotland
- World Championship: 1 (1981)
- European Championship: 1 (1981)
Medal record
Curling
Scottish Women's Championship
Gold medal – first place	1981

Helen Caird is a Scottish curler.

She competed as the skip of Team Scotland at the 1981 World Women's Championship, where she finished in sixth place. She was the skip of Scotland at the 1981 European Championships, where she finished in seventh place. She is a 1981 Scottish Women's champion curler and 1988 Scottish Senior champion curler.

In the 1985–1986 season she was a president of Scottish Curling Ladies Branch.

== Teams ==
=== Women's ===
Season	Skip	Third	Second	Lead	Events
1980–81	Helen Caird	Rae Gray	Sheena Hay	Helen Watson	SWCC 1981 (gold); WCC 1981 (6th)
1981–82	Helen Caird	Rae Gray	Sheena Hay	Helen Watson	ECC 1981 (7th)
1987–88	Helen Caird	Isobel Roy	Jean Fairlie	Betty Scott	SSCC 1988 (gold)
