= Karin Sjögren =

Swedish female curler

- Curler ♀
- Born: 9 September 1960 (age 66)

Team
- Curling club: Karlstads CK, Karlstad

Curling career
- Member Association: Sweden
- World Championship: 3 (1980, 1981, 1982)
- European Championship: 4 (1980, 1981, 1982, 1983)
Medal record
Curling
World championships
Gold medal – first place	1981 Perth
Silver medal – second place	1980 Perth
Silver medal – second place	1982 Geneva
European Championships
Gold medal – first place	1980 Copenhagen
Gold medal – first place	1982 Kirkcaldy
Gold medal – first place	1983 Västerås
Silver medal – second place	1981 Grindelwald
Swedish Women's Championship
Gold medal – first place	1980
Gold medal – first place	1981
Gold medal – first place	1982

Karin Sjögren (born 9 September 1960) is a Swedish female curler.

She is a 1981 World champion and a three-time European champion (1980, 1982, 1983).

In 1982 she was inducted into the Swedish Curling Hall of Fame.

== Teams ==
Season	Skip	Third	Second	Lead	Events
1979—80	Elisabeth Högström	Carina Olsson	Birgitta Sewik	Karin Sjögren	SWCC 1980 (gold); WCC 1980 (silver)
1980—81	Elisabeth Högström	Carina Olsson	Birgitta Sewik	Karin Sjögren	ECC 1980 (gold); SWCC 1981 (gold); WCC 1981 (gold)
1981—82	Elisabeth Högström	Katarina Hultling	Birgitta Sewik	Karin Sjögren	ECC 1981 (silver); SWCC 1982 (gold); WCC 1982 (silver)
1982—83	Elisabeth Högström	Katarina Hultling	Birgitta Sewik	Karin Sjögren	ECC 1982 (gold)
1983—84	Elisabeth Högström	Katarina Hultling	Birgitta Sewik	Karin Sjögren	ECC 1983 (gold)
