= 2013 United States Women's Curling Championship – Qualification =

Qualification for the 2013 United States Women's Curling Championship consists of three different paths. Four teams qualified directly through the High Performance Program or the Order of Merit system. The number of the remaining entrants to the national championships will be cut down to six teams through a challenge round held in mid-January.

== Qualification system ==
Teams will qualify to participate in the women's national championship through the High Performance Program, through the World Curling Tour Order of Merit, or through a challenge round.

=== Automatic qualification ===
Two spots in the nationals were awarded to two teams on the United States Curling Association's High Performance National Program, established as an invitation-based program for the development of the top curling teams in the United States. The teams qualified through the High Performance Program were those skipped by Laura Roessler, who is filling in for normal skip Cassandra Potter, and Allison Pottinger. Two more spots were awarded to the top two women's teams on the World Curling Tour Order of Merit standings table following the conclusion of the Iron Trail Motors Shoot-Out. If one or both of the top teams already qualified for the nationals through the High Performance Program, the spot or spots would have been awarded to the team with the next highest position on the Order of Merit. The teams qualified through the Order of Merit were those skipped by Erika Brown and Patti Lank.

=== Challenge round ===
The remaining six spots in the nationals will be awarded to the teams that earn qualification spots through the challenge round. The challenge round will be held in a triple knockout format, and is an open registration event. The teams that enter the challenge round will be seeded through a strength of field ranking and through a peer ranking. The strength of field ranking will be based on players' participation and performance in national championships and world championships. The seedings will influence the draw of the triple knockout event.

== Challenge round ==
The challenge round for the women's nationals will be held from January 17 to 21 at the Granite Curling Club in Seattle, Washington. Six teams will advance from the challenge round to the nationals.

=== Teams ===
The teams are listed as follows:

| Skip | Third | Second | Lead | Alternate | Locale |
|---|---|---|---|---|---|
| Sarah Anderson | Courtney Slata | Kathleen Dubberstein | Taylor Anderson | | Philadelphia, Pennsylvania |
| Alexandra Carlson | Monica Walker | Kendall Moulton-Behm | Jordan Moulton | | Minneapolis, Minnesota |
| Cristin Clark | Patti Killins | Christina Pastula | Christie Wilhelmy | | (Washington (state)) Seattle, Washington |
| Gabrielle Coleman | Britt Rjanikov | Ann Drummie | Mary Shields | | San Francisco, California |
| Casey Cucchiarelli | Joyance Meechai | Jennifer Cahak | Courtney Shaw | | (New York (state)) New York City, New York |
| Brigid Ellig | Heather Van Sistine | Julia Boles | Sara Shuster | | St. Paul, Minnesota |
| Emily Good | Elizabeth LeBeau | Marissa Wright | Leslie Frosch | | (Washington (state)) Seattle, Washington |
| Becca Hamilton | Molly Bonner | Tara Peterson | Sophie Brorson | | Madison, Wisconsin |
| Shelly Kinney | Amy Lou Anderson | Theresa Hoffoss | Julie Smith | | Minnesota |
| Charrissa Lin | Sherri Schummer | Emilia Juocys | Senja Lopac | Joni Cotten | New Haven, Connecticut |
| Maureen Stolt | Megan O'Connell | Amanda Tucker | Victoria Forconi | | Minnesota |
| Sharon Vukich | Cynthia Garzina | Jennifer Westhagen | Cathie Tomlinson | | (Washington (state)) Seattle, Washington |
| Kimberly Wapola | Cynthia Eng-Dinsel | Carol Strojny | Ann Flis | | St. Paul, Minnesota |
| Courtney George | Aileen Sormunen | Amanda McLean | Julie Lilla | Amy Wright | Duluth, Minnesota |

=== Knockout Draw Brackets ===
The draw is listed as follows:

==== A Event ====
First Knockout
(Minnesota) Shelly Kinney | 8
(Washington (state)) Emily Good | 4
(Washington (state)) Sharon Vukich | 6
(Connecticut) Charrissa Lin | 7
(Pennsylvania) Sarah Anderson | 5
(California) Gabrielle Coleman | 4

Semifinals
(Minnesota) Shelly Kinney | 0
(Minnesota) Courtney George | 8
(Connecticut) Charrissa Lin | 7
(Pennsylvania) Sarah Anderson | 10

Qualifier 1
(Minnesota) Courtney George | 8
(Pennsylvania) Sarah Anderson | 5

First Knockout
(Minnesota) Brigid Ellig | 6
(Minnesota) Maureen Stolt | 7
(New York (state)) Casey Cucchiarelli | 1
(Wisconsin) Becca Hamilton | 9
(Washington (state)) Cristin Clark | 6
(Minnesota) Kimberly Wapola | 2

Semifinals
(Minnesota) Maureen Stolt | 6
(Minnesota) Alexandra Carlson | 7
(Wisconsin) Becca Hamilton | 6
(Washington (state)) Cristin Clark | 7

Qualifier 2
(Minnesota) Alexandra Carlson | 5
(Washington (state)) Cristin Clark | 3

==== B Event ====
Second Knockout
(Washington (state)) Sharon Vukich | 5
(California) Gabrielle Coleman | 11

Quarterfinals
(Minnesota) Maureen Stolt | 6
(California) Gabrielle Coleman | 5
(Washington (state)) Emily Good | 3
(Wisconsin) Becca Hamilton | 8

Semifinals
(Minnesota) Maureen Stolt | 4
(Wisconsin) Becca Hamilton | 12

Qualifier 3
(Pennsylvania) Sarah Anderson | 6
(Wisconsin) Becca Hamilton | 9

Second Knockout
(New York (state)) Casey Cucchiarelli | 6
(Minnesota) Kimberly Wapola | 9

Quarterfinals
(Minnesota) Shelly Kinney | 8
(Minnesota) Kimberly Wapola | 4
(Minnesota) Brigid Ellig | 10
(Connecticut) Charrissa Lin | 11

Semifinals
(Minnesota) Shelly Kinney | 6
(Connecticut) Charrissa Lin | 4

Qualifier 4
(Washington (state)) Cristin Clark | 5
(Minnesota) Shelly Kinney | 6

==== C Event ====
Third Knockout
(Washington (state)) Sharon Vukich | 7
(Minnesota) Kimberly Wapola | 6

Quarterfinals
(Minnesota) Brigid Ellig | 1
(Washington (state)) Sharon Vukich | 8

Semifinals
(Minnesota) Maureen Stolt | 7
(Washington (state)) Sharon Vukich | 6

Qualifier 5
(Washington (state)) Cristin Clark | 5
(Minnesota) Maureen Stolt | 4

Third Knockout
(New York (state)) Casey Cucchiarelli | 7
(California) Gabrielle Coleman | 3

Quarterfinals
(Washington (state)) Emily Good | 12
(New York (state)) Casey Cucchiarelli | 8

Semifinals
(Connecticut) Charrissa Lin | 10
(Washington (state)) Emily Good | 9

Qualifier 6
(Pennsylvania) Sarah Anderson | 6
(Connecticut) Charrissa Lin | 5

=== Knockout results ===
All draw times listed in Pacific Standard Time (UTC-8).

==== Draw 1 ====
Friday, January 18, 9:00 am

| Sheet 1 | 1 | 2 | 3 | 4 | 5 | 6 | 7 | 8 | 9 | 10 | 11 | Final |
|---|---|---|---|---|---|---|---|---|---|---|---|---|
| (Washington (state)) Sharon Vukich | 0 | 0 | 2 | 2 | 0 | 1 | 0 | 1 | 0 | 0 | 0 | 6 |
| (Connecticut) Charrissa Lin | 3 | 0 | 0 | 0 | 1 | 0 | 0 | 0 | 1 | 1 | 1 | 7 |

| Sheet 2 | 1 | 2 | 3 | 4 | 5 | 6 | 7 | 8 | 9 | 10 | Final |
|---|---|---|---|---|---|---|---|---|---|---|---|
| (New York (state)) Casey Cucchiarelli | 0 | 0 | 0 | 0 | 1 | 0 | 0 | X | X | X | 1 |
| (Wisconsin) Becca Hamilton | 2 | 0 | 1 | 2 | 0 | 1 | 3 | X | X | X | 9 |

| Sheet 3 | 1 | 2 | 3 | 4 | 5 | 6 | 7 | 8 | 9 | 10 | 11 | Final |
|---|---|---|---|---|---|---|---|---|---|---|---|---|
| (Pennsylvania) Sarah Anderson | 1 | 0 | 0 | 1 | 0 | 1 | 1 | 0 | 0 | 0 | 1 | 5 |
| (California) Gabrielle Coleman | 0 | 1 | 0 | 0 | 1 | 0 | 0 | 0 | 1 | 1 | 0 | 4 |

| Sheet 4 | 1 | 2 | 3 | 4 | 5 | 6 | 7 | 8 | 9 | 10 | Final |
|---|---|---|---|---|---|---|---|---|---|---|---|
| (Washington (state)) Cristin Clark | 1 | 1 | 1 | 0 | 0 | 0 | 1 | 1 | 1 | X | 6 |
| (Minnesota) Kimberly Wapola | 0 | 0 | 0 | 2 | 0 | 0 | 0 | 0 | 0 | X | 2 |

| Sheet 5 | 1 | 2 | 3 | 4 | 5 | 6 | 7 | 8 | 9 | 10 | Final |
|---|---|---|---|---|---|---|---|---|---|---|---|
| (Minnesota) Brigid Ellig | 0 | 3 | 0 | 0 | 1 | 0 | 1 | 0 | 1 | X | 6 |
| (Minnesota) Maureen Stolt | 1 | 0 | 1 | 3 | 0 | 1 | 0 | 1 | 0 | X | 7 |

==== Draw 2 ====
Friday, January 18, 2:00 pm

| Sheet 1 | 1 | 2 | 3 | 4 | 5 | 6 | 7 | 8 | 9 | 10 | Final |
|---|---|---|---|---|---|---|---|---|---|---|---|
| (Minnesota) Shelly Kinney | 1 | 0 | 0 | 2 | 1 | 0 | 3 | 1 | 0 | X | 8 |
| (Washington (state)) Emily Good | 0 | 1 | 0 | 0 | 0 | 2 | 0 | 0 | 1 | X | 4 |

| Sheet 4 | 1 | 2 | 3 | 4 | 5 | 6 | 7 | 8 | 9 | 10 | Final |
|---|---|---|---|---|---|---|---|---|---|---|---|
| (Minnesota) Maureen Stolt | 0 | 0 | 0 | 3 | 0 | 1 | 0 | 0 | 2 | 0 | 6 |
| (Minnesota) Alexandra Carlson | 1 | 1 | 1 | 0 | 1 | 0 | 0 | 1 | 0 | 2 | 7 |

| Sheet 5 | 1 | 2 | 3 | 4 | 5 | 6 | 7 | 8 | 9 | 10 | Final |
|---|---|---|---|---|---|---|---|---|---|---|---|
| (Connecticut) Charrissa Lin | 0 | 2 | 0 | 0 | 1 | 0 | 3 | 0 | 1 | 0 | 7 |
| (Pennsylvania) Sarah Anderson | 3 | 0 | 1 | 2 | 0 | 1 | 0 | 2 | 0 | 1 | 10 |

==== Draw 3 ====
Friday, January 18, 7:00 pm

| Sheet 1 | 1 | 2 | 3 | 4 | 5 | 6 | 7 | 8 | 9 | 10 | Final |
|---|---|---|---|---|---|---|---|---|---|---|---|
| (Minnesota) Kimberly Wapola | 1 | 0 | 2 | 0 | 0 | 2 | 1 | 0 | 0 | 3 | 9 |
| (New York (state)) Casey Cucchiarelli | 0 | 1 | 0 | 2 | 1 | 0 | 0 | 1 | 1 | 0 | 6 |

| Sheet 3 | 1 | 2 | 3 | 4 | 5 | 6 | 7 | 8 | 9 | 10 | Final |
|---|---|---|---|---|---|---|---|---|---|---|---|
| (Wisconsin) Becca Hamilton | 0 | 1 | 0 | 1 | 0 | 1 | 0 | 2 | 1 | 0 | 6 |
| (Washington (state)) Cristin Clark | 1 | 0 | 2 | 0 | 2 | 0 | 1 | 0 | 0 | 1 | 7 |

| Sheet 4 | 1 | 2 | 3 | 4 | 5 | 6 | 7 | 8 | 9 | 10 | Final |
|---|---|---|---|---|---|---|---|---|---|---|---|
| (California) Gabrielle Coleman | 0 | 1 | 0 | 1 | 0 | 3 | 2 | 2 | 2 | X | 11 |
| (Washington (state)) Sharon Vukich | 2 | 0 | 1 | 0 | 2 | 0 | 0 | 0 | 0 | X | 5 |

| Sheet 5 | 1 | 2 | 3 | 4 | 5 | 6 | 7 | 8 | 9 | 10 | Final |
|---|---|---|---|---|---|---|---|---|---|---|---|
| (Minnesota) Shelly Kinney | 0 | 0 | 0 | 0 | 0 | X | X | X | X | X | 0 |
| (Minnesota) Courtney George | 2 | 1 | 0 | 2 | 3 | X | X | X | X | X | 8 |

==== Draw 4 ====
Saturday, January 19, 9:00 am

| Sheet 1 | 1 | 2 | 3 | 4 | 5 | 6 | 7 | 8 | 9 | 10 | Final |
|---|---|---|---|---|---|---|---|---|---|---|---|
| (Minnesota) Maureen Stolt | 0 | 1 | 0 | 2 | 1 | 1 | 0 | 0 | 0 | 1 | 6 |
| (California) Gabrielle Coleman | 2 | 0 | 1 | 0 | 0 | 0 | 2 | 0 | 0 | 0 | 5 |

| Sheet 3 | 1 | 2 | 3 | 4 | 5 | 6 | 7 | 8 | 9 | 10 | Final |
|---|---|---|---|---|---|---|---|---|---|---|---|
| (Minnesota) Brigid Ellig | 0 | 1 | 2 | 2 | 0 | 2 | 0 | 2 | 1 | X | 10 |
| (Connecticut) Charrissa Lin | 5 | 0 | 0 | 0 | 2 | 0 | 4 | 0 | 0 | X | 11 |

| Sheet 4 | 1 | 2 | 3 | 4 | 5 | 6 | 7 | 8 | 9 | 10 | Final |
|---|---|---|---|---|---|---|---|---|---|---|---|
| (Minnesota) Shelly Kinney | 0 | 0 | 1 | 1 | 0 | 1 | 4 | 0 | 1 | X | 8 |
| (Minnesota) Kimberley Wapola | 1 | 1 | 0 | 0 | 1 | 0 | 0 | 1 | 0 | X | 4 |

| Sheet 5 | 1 | 2 | 3 | 4 | 5 | 6 | 7 | 8 | 9 | 10 | Final |
|---|---|---|---|---|---|---|---|---|---|---|---|
| (Washington (state)) Emily Good | 1 | 0 | 0 | 0 | 1 | 1 | 0 | 0 | 0 | X | 3 |
| (Wisconsin) Becca Hamilton | 0 | 1 | 2 | 0 | 0 | 0 | 2 | 2 | 1 | X | 8 |

==== Draw 5 ====
Saturday, January 19, 2:00 pm

| Sheet 1 | 1 | 2 | 3 | 4 | 5 | 6 | 7 | 8 | 9 | 10 | Final |
|---|---|---|---|---|---|---|---|---|---|---|---|
| (Minnesota) Alexandra Carlson | 1 | 0 | 0 | 0 | 2 | 0 | 1 | 0 | 0 | 1 | 5 |
| (Washington (state)) Cristin Clark | 0 | 0 | 1 | 0 | 0 | 1 | 0 | 1 | 0 | 0 | 3 |

| Sheet 2 | 1 | 2 | 3 | 4 | 5 | 6 | 7 | 8 | 9 | 10 | Final |
|---|---|---|---|---|---|---|---|---|---|---|---|
| (Minnesota) Maureen Stolt | 4 | 0 | 0 | 3 | 0 | 0 | 5 | X | X | X | 12 |
| (Wisconsin) Becca Hamilton | 0 | 1 | 1 | 0 | 1 | 1 | 0 | X | X | X | 4 |

| Sheet 3 | 1 | 2 | 3 | 4 | 5 | 6 | 7 | 8 | 9 | 10 | Final |
|---|---|---|---|---|---|---|---|---|---|---|---|
| (Washington (state)) Sharon Vukich | 0 | 1 | 0 | 1 | 2 | 0 | 0 | 2 | 0 | 0 | 6 |
| (Minnesota) Kimberly Wapola | 1 | 0 | 1 | 0 | 0 | 0 | 2 | 0 | 2 | 1 | 7 |

| Sheet 4 | 1 | 2 | 3 | 4 | 5 | 6 | 7 | 8 | 9 | 10 | Final |
|---|---|---|---|---|---|---|---|---|---|---|---|
| (Minnesota) Courtney George | 1 | 0 | 4 | 1 | 0 | 2 | 0 | 0 | X | X | 8 |
| (Pennsylvania) Sarah Anderson | 0 | 1 | 0 | 0 | 2 | 0 | 1 | 1 | X | X | 5 |

| Sheet 5 | 1 | 2 | 3 | 4 | 5 | 6 | 7 | 8 | 9 | 10 | Final |
|---|---|---|---|---|---|---|---|---|---|---|---|
| (New York (state)) Casey Cucchiarelli | 0 | 1 | 2 | 1 | 1 | 1 | 0 | 1 | 0 | X | 7 |
| (California) Gabrielle Coleman | 0 | 0 | 0 | 0 | 0 | 0 | 2 | 0 | 1 | X | 3 |

==== Draw 6 ====
Saturday, January 19, 7:00 pm

| Sheet 1 | 1 | 2 | 3 | 4 | 5 | 6 | 7 | 8 | 9 | 10 | Final |
|---|---|---|---|---|---|---|---|---|---|---|---|
| (Minnesota) Shelly Kinney | 0 | 1 | 0 | 1 | 0 | 0 | 2 | 0 | 0 | 2 | 6 |
| (Connecticut) Charrissa Lin | 1 | 0 | 1 | 0 | 1 | 0 | 0 | 1 | 0 | 0 | 4 |

| Sheet 2 | 1 | 2 | 3 | 4 | 5 | 6 | 7 | 8 | 9 | 10 | Final |
|---|---|---|---|---|---|---|---|---|---|---|---|
| (Minnesota) Brigid Ellig | 0 | 0 | 0 | 1 | 0 | 0 | 0 | X | X | X | 1 |
| (Washington (state)) Sharon Vukich | 1 | 1 | 2 | 0 | 1 | 1 | 2 | X | X | X | 8 |

| Sheet 3 | 1 | 2 | 3 | 4 | 5 | 6 | 7 | 8 | 9 | 10 | Final |
|---|---|---|---|---|---|---|---|---|---|---|---|
| (Washington (state)) Emily Good | 2 | 0 | 0 | 2 | 0 | 1 | 0 | 2 | 0 | 5 | 12 |
| (New York (state)) Casey Cucchiarelli | 0 | 1 | 2 | 0 | 2 | 0 | 2 | 0 | 1 | 0 | 8 |

==== Draw 7 ====
Sunday, January 20, 9:00 am

| Sheet 1 | 1 | 2 | 3 | 4 | 5 | 6 | 7 | 8 | 9 | 10 | Final |
|---|---|---|---|---|---|---|---|---|---|---|---|
| (Minnesota) Maureen Stolt | 2 | 0 | 1 | 0 | 2 | 1 | 0 | 0 | 0 | 1 | 7 |
| (Washington (state)) Sharon Vukich | 0 | 0 | 0 | 1 | 0 | 0 | 1 | 1 | 3 | 0 | 6 |

| Sheet 2 | 1 | 2 | 3 | 4 | 5 | 6 | 7 | 8 | 9 | 10 | Final |
|---|---|---|---|---|---|---|---|---|---|---|---|
| (Washington (state)) Cristin Clark | 1 | 0 | 1 | 1 | 0 | 0 | 1 | 0 | 0 | 1 | 5 |
| (Minnesota) Shelly Kinney | 0 | 2 | 0 | 0 | 1 | 0 | 0 | 1 | 2 | 0 | 6 |

| Sheet 3 | 1 | 2 | 3 | 4 | 5 | 6 | 7 | 8 | 9 | 10 | Final |
|---|---|---|---|---|---|---|---|---|---|---|---|
| (Pennsylvania) Sarah Anderson | 0 | 3 | 0 | 0 | 0 | 0 | 1 | 0 | 2 | 0 | 6 |
| (Wisconsin) Becca Hamilton | 1 | 0 | 1 | 2 | 1 | 1 | 0 | 1 | 0 | 2 | 9 |

| Sheet 4 | 1 | 2 | 3 | 4 | 5 | 6 | 7 | 8 | 9 | 10 | Final |
|---|---|---|---|---|---|---|---|---|---|---|---|
| (Connecticut) Charrissa Lin | 4 | 1 | 0 | 0 | 2 | 0 | 0 | 2 | 0 | 1 | 10 |
| (Washington (state)) Emily Good | 0 | 0 | 1 | 1 | 0 | 2 | 2 | 0 | 3 | 0 | 9 |

==== Draw 8 ====
Sunday, January 20, 2:00 pm

| Sheet 2 | 1 | 2 | 3 | 4 | 5 | 6 | 7 | 8 | 9 | 10 | 11 | Final |
|---|---|---|---|---|---|---|---|---|---|---|---|---|
| (Connecticut) Charrissa Lin | 0 | 0 | 1 | 0 | 1 | 0 | 1 | 0 | 0 | 2 | 0 | 5 |
| (Pennsylvania) Sarah Anderson | 0 | 1 | 0 | 2 | 0 | 0 | 0 | 1 | 1 | 0 | 1 | 6 |

| Sheet 3 | 1 | 2 | 3 | 4 | 5 | 6 | 7 | 8 | 9 | 10 | 11 | Final |
|---|---|---|---|---|---|---|---|---|---|---|---|---|
| (Minnesota) Maureen Stolt | 0 | 1 | 0 | 1 | 0 | 0 | 1 | 0 | 0 | 1 | 0 | 4 |
| (Washington (state)) Cristin Clark | 1 | 0 | 1 | 0 | 1 | 0 | 0 | 1 | 0 | 0 | 1 | 5 |
