= Irene Bürgi =

Swiss curler

- Curler ♀

Team
- Curling club: CC Bern-Damen, Bern

Curling career
- Member Association: Switzerland
- World Championship: 3 (1981, 1984, 1986)
- European Championship: 3 (1981, 1982, 1984)
Medal record
Curling
World Championships
Silver medal – second place	1984 Perth
European Championships
Gold medal – first place	1981 Grindelwald
Bronze medal – third place	1982 Kirkcaldy
Bronze medal – third place	1984 Morzine
Swiss Women's Championship
Gold medal – first place	1981
Gold medal – first place	1984
Gold medal – first place	1986

Irene Bürgi is a former Swiss curler. She played third position on the Swiss rink that won the 1981 European Championships.

== Teams ==
Season	Skip	Third	Second	Lead	Events
1980–81	Susan Schlapbach	Irene Bürgi	Ursula Schlapbach	Katrin Peterhans	SWCC 1981 (gold); WCC 1981 (4th)
1981–82	Susan Schlapbach	Irene Bürgi	Ursula Schlapbach	Katrin Peterhans	ECC 1981 (gold)
1982–83	Susan Schlapbach	Irene Bürgi	Ursula Schlapbach	Katrin Peterhans	ECC 1982 (bronze)
1983–84	Brigitte Kienast	Irene Bürgi	Erika Frewein	Evi Rüegsegger	SWCC 1984 (gold); WCC 1984 (silver)
1984–85	Irene Bürgi	Isabelle Köpfli	Evi Attinger	Brigitte Kienast	ECC 1984 (bronze)
1985–86	Erika Müller	Irene Bürgi	Barbara Meier	Cristina Lestander	SWCC 1986 (gold); WCC 1986 (6th)
