= Kirsi Jeskanen =

Finnish curler

- Curler ♀

Team
- Curling club: Hyvinkää CC, Hyvinkää

Curling career
- Member Association: Finland
- World Championship: 1 (1987)
- European Championship: 2 (1985, 1986)
Medal record
Curling

Kirsi Jeskanen is a Finnish curler.

== Teams ==
Season	Skip	Third	Second	Lead	Events
1985–86	Jaana Jokela	Nina Ahvenainen	Taru Kivinen	Kirsi Jeskanen	ECC 1985 (9th)
1986–87	Taru Kivinen (fourth)	Jaana Jokela (skip)	Kirsi Jeskanen	Nina Ahvenainen	ECC 1986 (10th)
1986–87	Taru Kivinen (fourth)	Jaana Jokela (skip)	Nina Ahvenainen	Kirsi Jeskanen	WCC 1987 (9th)
