= Jaqueline Landolt =

Swiss female curler

- Curler ♀

Team
- Curling club: CC Lausanne Olympique, Lausanne

Curling career
- Member Association: Switzerland
- European Championship: 2 (1980, 1985)
Medal record
Curling
European Championships
Gold medal – first place	1985 Grindelwald

Jaqueline Landolt is a Swiss former female curler. She played skip position on the Swiss rink that won 1985 European Championships.

== Teams ==
=== Women's ===
Season	Skip	Third	Second	Lead	Events
1980–81	Gaby Charrière	Jaqueline Landolt	Marianne Uhlmann	Cécilie Blanvillian	ECC 1980 (6th)
1985–86	Jaqueline Landolt	Christine Krieg	Marianne Uhlmann	Silvia Benoit	ECC 1985 (gold)

=== Mixed ===
Season	Skip	Third	Second	Lead	Events
1986–87	Rolf Waldmeier	Jaqueline Landolt	Manfred Winkler	Barbara Schärer	SMxCC 1987 (gold)
