= Jaana Jokela =

Finnish curler and coach

- Curler ♀
- Other names: Jaana Häkkinen

Team
- Curling club: Hyvinkää CC, Hyvinkää

Curling career
- Member Association: Finland
- World Championship: 9 (1987, 1989, 1992, 1993, 1994, 1996, 1997, 1998, 1999)
- European Championship: 15 (1985, 1986, 1988, 1989, 1990, 1991, 1992, 1993, 1995, 1996, 1997, 1998, 1999, 2000)
Medal record
Curling
Finnish Women's Championship
Gold medal – first place	1995
Gold medal – first place	1996
Gold medal – first place	1997
Gold medal – first place	1998
Gold medal – first place	1999
Gold medal – first place	2000
Gold medal – first place	2001
Gold medal – first place	2002
Silver medal – second place	2003
Silver medal – second place	2004

Jaana Jokela (also known as Jaana Häkkinen) is a Finnish curler and curling coach.

At the national level, she is an eight-time Finnish women's champion curler (1995, 1996, 1997, 1998, 1999, 2000, 2001, 2002).

At the international level, she was a long-time skip of the Finnish national women's team, competing in nine World championships and fifteen European championships.

She is the only women's curler to have been awarded the Frances Brodie Award twice (1993, 1997).

== Teams ==
Season	Skip	Third	Second	Lead	Alternate	Coach	Events
1985–86	Jaana Jokela	Nina Ahvenainen	Taru Kivinen	Kirsi Jeskanen			ECC 1985 (9th)
1986–87	Taru Kivinen (fourth)	Jaana Jokela (skip)	Kirsi Jeskanen	Nina Ahvenainen			ECC 1986 (10th)
1986–87	Taru Kivinen (fourth)	Jaana Jokela (skip)	Nina Ahvenainen	Kirsi Jeskanen			WCC 1987 (9th)
1988–89	Jaana Jokela	Terhi Aro	Nina Ahvenainen	Carita Säilä	Tiina Majuri		ECC 1988 (12th)
1988–89	Jaana Jokela	Nina Ahvenainen	Terhi Aro	Tiina Majuri			WCC 1989 (10th)
1989–90	Jaana Jokela	Terhi Aro	Mari Lundén	Heidi Koskiheimo			ECC 1989 (9th)
1990–91	Jaana Jokela	Terhi Aro	Nina Ahvenainen	Heidi Koskiheimo	Marita Ripatti		ECC 1990 (7th)
1991–92	Jaana Jokela	Terhi Aro	Nina Pöllänen	Heidi Koskiheimo	Sari Suvanto		ECC 1991 (8th)
1991–92	Jaana Jokela	Terhi Aro	Nina Ahvenainen	Heidi Koskiheimo			WCC 1992 (10th)
1992–93	Jaana Jokela	Terhi Aro	Heidi Koskiheimo	Mari Lundén			ECC 1992 (5th)
1992–93	Terhi Aro (fourth)	Jaana Jokela (skip)	Heidi Koskiheimo	Mari Lundén	Marita Ripatti		WCC 1993 (10th)
1993–94	Jaana Jokela	Terhi Aro	Nina Pöllänen	Laura Franssila	Minna Kontio		ECC 1993 (5th)
1993–94	Jaana Jokela	Nina Pöllänen	Terhi Aro	Laura Franssila	Anne Eerikäinen		WCC 1994 (6th)
1994–95	Jaana Jokela	Nina Pöllänen	Anne Eerikäinen	Laura Franssila	Tiina Tenkanen		FWCC 1995 (gold)
1995–96	Jaana Jokela	Anne Eerikäinen	Nina Pöllänen	Laura Franssila	Matti Orrainen		ECC 1995 (6th)
1995–96	Jaana Jokela	Anne Eerikäinen	Nina Pöllänen	Laura Franssila	Tiina Kautonen		FWCC 1996 (gold)
1995–96	Jaana Jokela	Nina Pöllänen	Anne Eerikäinen	Laura Franssila	Tiina Tenkanen		WCC 1996 (10th)
1996–97	Jaana Jokela	Anne Eerikäinen	Laura Franssila	Johanna Kartano	Tiina Kautonen		ECC 1996 (6th)
1996–97	Jaana Jokela	Anne Eerikäinen	Nina Pöllänen	Laura Franssila	Tiina Kautonen		FWCC 1997 (gold)
1996–97	Anne Eerikäinen (fourth)	Jaana Jokela (skip)	Nina Pöllänen	Laura Franssila	Tiina Kautonen		WCC 1997 (8th)
1997–98	Anne Eerikäinen (fourth)	Jaana Jokela	Nina Pöllänen	Laura Franssila	Tiina Kautonen	Gail McMillan	ECC 1997 (4th); WCC 1998 (10th)
1997–98	Jaana Jokela	Anne Malmi	Nina Pöllänen	Laura Franssila	Tiina Kautonen		FWCC 1998 (gold)
1998–99	Anne Eerikäinen	Jaana Jokela	Jaana Hämäläinen	Tiina Kautonen		Anders Hed‚n	ECC 1998 (7th)
1998–99	Anne Eerikäinen	Jaana Jokela	Jaana Hämäläinen	Laura Franssila	Tiina Kautonen		FWCC 1999 (gold)
1998–99	Anne Eerikäinen	Tiina Kautonen	Jaana Hämäläinen	Jaana Jokela	Minna Malinen		WCC 1999 (8th)
1999–00	Jaana Hämäläinen (fourth)	Jaana Jokela (skip)	Laura Franssila	Tiina Kautonen		Kalle Kiiskinen	ECC 1999 (11th)
1999–00	Jaana Hämäläinen	Jaana Häkkinen	Nina Pöllänen	Tiina Kautonen	Laura Tsutsunen		FWCC 2000 (gold)
2000–01	Nina Pöllänen (fourth)	Jaana Jokela (skip)	Tiina Kautonen	Laura Tsutsunen	Jaana Hämäläinen		ECC 2000 (9th)
2000–01	Jaana Häkkinen	Nina Pöllänen	Laura Tsutsunen	Tiina Kautonen	Minna Malinen, Jaana Hämäläinen		FWCC 2001 (gold)
2001–02	Nina Pöllänen (fourth)	Jaana Jokela (skip)	Tiina Kautonen	Laura Tsutsunen	Minna Malinen	Kirsi Nykänen	ECC 2001 (8th)
2001–02	Kirsi Nykänen	Jaana Häkkinen	Nina Pöllänen	Laura Tsutsunen	Tiina Kautonen, Minna Soikkeli		FWCC 2002 (gold)
2002–03	Anne Malmi	Jaana Häkkinen	Sari Auvinen	Johanna Pyyhtiä	Hannele Liesmäki		FWCC 2003 (silver)
2003–04	Anne Malmi	Jaana Häkkinen	?	?			FWCC 2004 (silver)
2015–16	Oiva Manninen	Jaana Häkkinen	Risto Sakari Lehtinen	Hannu Siitari			FSCC 2016 (silver)

== Record as a coach of national teams ==
Year	Tournament, event	National team	Place
2006	2006 European Curling Championships	Finland (women)	12
2007	2007 European Curling Championships	Finland (women)	10
2017	2017 World Mixed Curling Championship	Finland (mixed)	32
