= Nancy Langley =

American curler

- Curler ♀
- Other names: Nancy Richard

Team
- Curling club: Granidears CC, Granite CC, Seattle

Curling career
- Member Association: United States
- World Championship: 4 (1979, 1981, 1983, 1988)
Medal record
Women's curling
United States National Championships
Gold medal – first place	1979 Winchester, MA
Gold medal – first place	1981 Kettle Moraine, WI
Gold medal – first place	1983 Grafton, ND
Gold medal – first place	1988 Darien, CT

Nancy Langley (in marriage Nancy Richard) is an American curler.

At the national level, she is a four-time United States women's champion curler (1979, 1981, 1983, 1988). She competed for USA on four World Women's Championships.

She is the first woman inductee as "curler" to the United States Curling Hall of Fame in 2001 (women before her were inducted as "builder").

== Teams ==
Season	Skip	Third	Second	Lead	Events
1978–79	Nancy Langley	Dolores Campbell	Leslie Frosch	Nancy Wallace	USWCC 1979 (gold); WCC 1979 (5th)
1980–81	Nancy Langley	Carol Dahl	Leslie Frosch	Nancy Wallace	USWCC 1981 (gold); WCC 1981 (8th)
1982–83	Nancy Langley	Dolores Campbell	Nancy Wallace	Leslie Frosch	USWCC 1983 (gold); WCC 1983 (8th)
1987–88	Nancy Langley	Nancy Pearson	Leslie Frosch	Mary Hobson	USWCC 1988 (gold); WCC 1988 (7th)
2004–05	Nancy Richard	Doreen Deaver	Leslie Frosch	Miyo Konno	2005 USWCC/USOCT (9th)

== Personal life ==
Her sister Leslie Frosch is also a curler, they played together on US championships and Worlds.
