= Silvia Benoit =

Swiss curler

- Curler ♀

Team
- Curling club: CC Lausanne Olympique, Lausanne

Curling career
- Member Association: Switzerland
- European Championship: 1 (1985)
Medal record
Curling
European Championships
Gold medal – first place	1985 Grindelwald

Silvia Benoit is a former Swiss curler. She played lead position on the Swiss rink that won the 1985 European Championships.

== Teams ==
Season	Skip	Third	Second	Lead	Events
1985–86	Jaqueline Landolt	Christine Krieg	Marianne Uhlmann	Silvia Benoit	ECC 1985 (gold)
