= Caroline Rück =

Swiss curler

- Curler ♀

Team
- Curling club: Winterthur CC, Winterthur

Curling career
- Member Association: Switzerland
- World Championship: 1 (1987)
- European Championship: 1 (1989)
Medal record
Curling
World Championships
Bronze medal – third place	1987 Chicago
European Championships
Silver medal – second place	1989 Engelberg
Swiss Women's Championship
Gold medal – first place	1987

Caroline Rück is a former Swiss curler.

She is a 1987 World women's bronze medallist and a 1989 European runner-up.

== Teams ==
Season	Skip	Third	Second	Lead	Events
1986–87	Marianne Flotron	Gisela Peter	Beatrice Frei	Caroline Rück	SWCC 1987 (gold); WCC 1987 (bronze)
1989–90	Marianne Flotron	Gisela Peter	Beatrice Frei	Caroline Rück	ECC 1989 (silver)
