= Nancy Pearson =

American curler

- Curler ♀
- Born: Nancy Wallace

Team
- Curling club: Granidears CC, Granite CC, Seattle

Curling career
- Member Association: United States
- World Championship: 4 (1979, 1981, 1983, 1988)
Medal record
Women's curling
United States National Championships
Gold medal – first place	1979 Winchester, MA
Gold medal – first place	1981 Kettle Moraine, WI
Gold medal – first place	1983 Grafton, ND
Gold medal – first place	1988 Darien, CT

Nancy Pearson (née Wallace) is an American curler.

At the national level, she is a four-time United States women's champion curler (1979, 1981, 1983, 1988). She competed for the United States at four World Women's Championships.

== Teams ==
Season	Skip	Third	Second	Lead	Events
1978–79	Nancy Langley	Dolores Campbell	Leslie Frosch	Nancy Wallace	USWCC 1979 (gold); WCC 1979 (5th)
1980–81	Nancy Langley	Carol Dahl	Leslie Frosch	Nancy Wallace	USWCC 1981 (gold); WCC 1981 (8th)
1982–83	Nancy Langley	Dolores Campbell	Nancy Wallace	Leslie Frosch	USWCC 1983 (gold); WCC 1983 (8th)
1987–88	Nancy Langley	Nancy Pearson	Leslie Frosch	Mary Hobson	USWCC 1988 (gold); WCC 1988 (7th)

== Personal life ==
She started curling at the age of 19, finished in 1997. Some years later, she started to compete as triathlon athlete.
