= Greig Henderson =

Scottish male curler and coach

- Curler ♂

Team
- Curling club: Haddo House Curling Club

Curling career
- Member Association: Scotland
- World Championship: 1 (1980)
- European Championship: 1 (1980)
Medal record
Curling
European Championships
Gold medal – first place	1980 Copenhagen
Scottish Men's Championship
Gold medal – first place	1980

Greig Henderson (born c. 1951) is a Scottish curler and curling coach. He is a 1980 European champion.

== Personal life ==
Henderson is married and has two children. He is employed as a farmer.

== Awards ==
- Collie Campbell Memorial Award: 1980

== Teams ==
Season	Skip	Third	Second	Lead	Events
1979–80	Barton Henderson	Greig Henderson	Bill Henderson	Alistair Sinclair	SMCC 1980 (gold); WCC 1980 (8th)
1980–81	Barton Henderson	Greig Henderson	Bill Henderson	Alistair Sinclair	ECC 1980 (gold)

== Record as a coach of national teams ==
Year	Tournament, event	National team	Place
2011	2011 World Junior Curling Championships	Scotland (junior men)	5
2014	2014 European Curling Championships	Scotland (men)	7
