= Marion Armour =

Scottish curler

- Curler ♀

Team
- Curling club: Hamilton & Thornyhill CC, Hamilton

Curling career
- Member Association: Scotland
- World Championship: 1 (1982)
- European Championship: 2 (1978, 1982)
Medal record
Curling
World Championships
Bronze medal – third place	1982 Perth
European Championships
Bronze medal – third place	1978 Aviemore
Scottish Women's Championship
Gold medal – first place	1978
Gold medal – first place	1982

Marion Armour is a Scottish curler.

She is a 1982 World bronze medallist.

== Teams ==
Season	Skip	Third	Second	Lead	Events
1977–78	Isobel Torrance	Isobel Waddell	Marion Armour	Margaret Wiseman	SWCC 1978 (gold)
1978–79	Isobel Torrance	Marion Armour	Isobel Waddell	Margaret Wiseman	ECC 1978 (bronze)
1981–82	Isobel Torrance	Isobel Waddell	Marion Armour	Margaret Wiseman	SWCC 1982 (gold); WCC 1982 (bronze)
1982–83	Isobel Torrance	Isobel Waddell	Marion Armour	Margaret Wiseman	ECC 1982 (7th)
