= Mary Hobson (curler) =

American curler

- Curler ♀

Team
- Curling club: Granite CC, Seattle

Curling career
- Member Association: United States
- World Championship: 1 (1988)
Medal record
Women's curling
United States National Championships
| Gold medal – first place | 1988 Darien, CT |

Mary Hobson is an American curler.

At the national level, she is a United States women's champion curler (1988). She competed for the United States at the 1988 World Women's Championship.

== Teams ==
| Season | Skip | Third | Second | Lead | Events |
|---|---|---|---|---|---|
| 1987–88 | Nancy Langley | Nancy Pearson | Leslie Frosch | Mary Hobson | USWCC 1988 (gold); WCC 1988 (7th) |
