= Beatrice Frei =

Swiss curler

- Curler ♀

Team
- Curling club: Winterthur CC, Winterthur

Curling career
- Member Association: Switzerland
- World Championship: 1 (1987)
- Other appearances: European Junior Championships: 2 (1984, 1986)
Medal record
Curling
World Championships
Bronze medal – third place	1987 Chicago
Swiss Women's Championship
Gold medal – first place	1987

Beatrice Frei is a former Swiss curler.

She is a 1987 World women's bronze medallist.

== Teams ==
Season	Skip	Third	Second	Lead	Events
1983–84	Marianne Flotron	Beatrice Arnold	Beatrice Frei	Jacky Zenhäusern	SJCC 1984 (gold)
1983–84	Marianne Flotron	Beatrice Arnold	Beatrice Frei	Diana Meichtry	EJCC 1984 (4th)
1985–86	Marianne Flotron	Sandra Burkhard	Beatrice Frei	Gisela Peter	SJCC 1986 (gold); EJCC 1986 (gold)
1986–87	Marianne Flotron	Gisela Peter	Beatrice Frei	Caroline Rück	SWCC 1987 (gold); WCC 1987 (bronze)
