= Ursula Schlapbach =

Swiss curler

- Curler ♀

Team
- Curling club: CC Bern-Damen, Bern

Curling career
- Member Association: Switzerland
- World Championship: 1 (1981)
- European Championship: 2 (1981, 1982)
Medal record
Curling
European Championships
Gold medal – first place	1981 Grindelwald
Bronze medal – third place	1982 Kirkcaldy
Swiss Women's Championship
Gold medal – first place	1981

Ursula Schlapbach is a former Swiss curler. She played second position on the Swiss rink that won the 1981 European Championships.

== Teams ==
Season	Skip	Third	Second	Lead	Events
1980–81	Susan Schlapbach	Irene Bürgi	Ursula Schlapbach	Katrin Peterhans	SWCC 1981 (gold); WCC 1981 (4th)
1981–82	Susan Schlapbach	Irene Bürgi	Ursula Schlapbach	Katrin Peterhans	ECC 1981 (gold)
1982–83	Susan Schlapbach	Irene Bürgi	Ursula Schlapbach	Katrin Peterhans	ECC 1982 (bronze)
