= Elisabeth Veening =

Dutch curler and coach

- Curler ♀

Team
- Curling club: Den Haag CC, The Hague

Curling career
- Member Association: Netherlands
- World Championship: 1 (1986)
Medal record
Curling

Elisabeth Veening is a Dutch curler.

== Teams ==
Season	Skip	Third	Second	Lead	Events
1985–86	Laura van Imhoff	Elisabeth Veening	Jenny Bovenschen	Marjorie Querido	WCC 1986 (10th)
