= Susan Schlapbach =

Swiss female curler

- Curler ♀

Team
- Curling club: CC Bern-Damen, Bern

Curling career
- Member Association: Switzerland
- World Championship: 1 (1981)
- European Championship: 2 (1981, 1982)
Medal record
Curling
European Championships
| Gold medal – first place | 1981 Grindelwald |
| Bronze medal – third place | 1982 Kirkcaldy |
Swiss Women's Championship
| Gold medal – first place | 1981 |

Susan Schlapbach is a former Swiss female curler. She played skip position on the Swiss rink that won the 1981 European Championships.

== Teams ==
| Season | Skip | Third | Second | Lead | Events |
|---|---|---|---|---|---|
| 1980–81 | Susan Schlapbach | Irene Bürgi | Ursula Schlapbach | Katrin Peterhans | SWCC 1981 (gold); WCC 1981 (4th) |
| 1981–82 | Susan Schlapbach | Irene Bürgi | Ursula Schlapbach | Katrin Peterhans | ECC 1981 (gold) |
| 1982–83 | Susan Schlapbach | Irene Bürgi | Ursula Schlapbach | Katrin Peterhans | ECC 1982 (bronze) |
