= Anne Jøtun =

Norwegian curler and world champion (born 1955)

- Curler
- Other names: Anne Bakke
- Born: 20 May 1955 (age 71)
Medal record
Women's curling
Representing Norway
Olympic Games
| Silver medal – second place | 1992 Albertville (demonstration) |
World Championships
| Gold medal – first place | 1990 Västerås |
| Gold medal – first place | 1991 Winnipeg |
| Bronze medal – third place | 1981 Perth |
European Championships
| Gold medal – first place | 1990 Lillehammer |

Anne Jøtun (born 20 May 1955; married as Anne Bakke, later divorced and took her maiden name back) is a Norwegian curler and world champion. She participated on the silver team at the demonstration event at the 1992 Winter Olympics. She was born in Oslo, Norway and is currently living in Jar.

== International championships ==
Jøtun is a two time world champion, winning in 1990 and 1991. She also won a gold medal at the 1990 European Curling Championships.
