= Marianne Qvist =

Danish curler

Medal record

Representing Denmark

Women's Curling

World championships
Gold medal – first place	1982 Geneve	Team

Marianne Qvist (Jørgensen) is a Danish curler and World Champion. She won a gold medal at the 1982 World Curling Championships, and a bronze medal at the 1981 European Curling Championships.
