= Karlstads Curlingklubb =

Curling club in Karlstad, Sweden

Karlstads Curlingklubb (Karlstads CK) is a curling club located in Karlstad, Sweden. It is currently best known as the home club of Team Niklas Edin, which holds a record of winning eight World Curling Championship titles and eight European Curling Championship titles. Edin-skipped Sweden national teams also won Bronze, Silver, and Gold Olympics medals at the 2014, 2018, and 2022 Winter games, respectively. It was also the home club of one of the most successful women's curling teams of all time, skipped by Elisabeth Högström. The team skipped by Högström won Sweden's first women's World Curling Championship gold medal, in addition to two World Curling Championship silver medals and four European Curling Championship gold medals.

== History ==
Karlstads CK was founded on October 12, 1926, at Stadshotellet in Karlstad. On December 28, 1927, the club's first match was played against teams from other cities in Sweden. In 2008, the Karlstad Curling Arena was opened and is now the current home for Karlstads CK. Over the course of its history, teams from Karlstads CK have won collectively more than 50 Swedish Curling Championships.

Karlstads CK is the home club for several well-known curling teams. The first to achieve notoriety on the global stage was skipped by Elisabeth Högström, who won Sweden's first women's World Championship gold medal in curling in 1981, along with Carina Olsson, Birgitta Sewik and Karin Sjögren. Högström also skipped teams to four European Curling Championship gold medals and won the silver medal in the curling exhibition at the Olympics in 1988. Anette Norberg also skipped the Karlstads CK team of Cecilia Östlund, Sara Carlsson, Liselotta Lennartsson, and Karin Rudström to a World Championship gold medal in 2011.

On the men's side, Karlstads CK is perhaps now best known as the home club for Team Niklas Edin, who holds the record for having won the most World Championship gold medals. Team Edin also holds the record for most European Curling Championship gold medals held by a single team. Team Niklas Edin is also the first non-Canadian team to win three Grand Slams in the Grand Slam of Curling and the only non-Canadian men's team to win the Pinty's Cup. Before Team Edin, the team of Connie Östlund, Per Lindeman, Carl von Wendt and Bo Andersson was the first team from Karlstads CK to win a World Championship medal, taking the bronze in 1984. Other successful curling Karlstads CK men's teams representing Sweden at the World Championships include the skipped by Oskar Eriksson, winning a silver medal at the 2014 World Men's Curling Championship. Other teams representing the club at the world championships include those skipped by Kjell Grengmark, Dan-Ola Eriksson, and Sören Grahn.

Today, Karlstads CK is well known for serving different age groups and curling needs. It is certified by the Swedish Curling Association as having a high standard for wheelchair curling.

== International Championships ==
Karlstads CK was the host club when Sweden hosted the 1977 World Men's Curling Championships at Färjestads Ishall. Sweden's men's team from Härnösand, skipped by Ragnar Kamp, won the gold medal.

Karlstads CK was also the host club when Sweden hosted the 2012 European Curling Championships at the Löfbergs Arena. Sweden's men's team, skipped by Niklas Edin, won the gold medal, while the women's team from Skellefteå, skipped by Margaretha Sigfridsson, took the bronze medal.
