= Elisabeth Högström =

Swedish curler

Personal information
- Nationality: Swedish
- Born: 17 March 1951 (age 75)

Sport
- Sport: Curling
Medal record
Representing Sweden
Women's Curling
Olympics
Silver medal – second place	1988 Calgary (demonstration)
World Championships
Gold medal – first place	1981 Perth	Team
Silver medal – second place	1980 Perth	Team
Silver medal – second place	1982 Geneva	Team
European Curling Championships
Gold medal – first place	1976 West Berlin	Team
Gold medal – first place	1980 Copenhagen	Team
Gold medal – first place	1982 Kirkcaldy	Team
Gold medal – first place	1983 Västerås	Team
Gold medal – first place	1988 Perth	Team
Silver medal – second place	1981 Grindelwald	Team

Elisabeth Högström (born 17 March 1951 as Elisabeth Carlsson) is a Swedish curler, world champion and five times European champion.

In 1973 she was inducted into the Swedish Curling Hall of Fame. In 2016 she was inducted into the World Curling Federation Hall of Fame.

== International championships ==
Högström became world champion in 1981 as skip for the Swedish team. She received a silver medal in 1980 and 1982.

She participated on the Swedish team that won the European championship in 1976. She received gold medals in the 1980, 1982, 1983 and 1988 European Curling Championships as skip for the team.

== Personal life ==
Her father Sven Carlsson was a curler too, 1968 Swedish men's champion, he played for Sweden at the 1968 World Men's curling championship.
