= Attinger =

Attinger is a surname. Notable people with the surname include:

- Alexander Attinger (born 1986), Swiss curler
- Bernhard Attinger (born 1953), Swiss curler
- Kurt Attinger (died 2011), Swiss curler
- Peter Attinger Jr. (born 1951), Swiss curler
- Ruedi Attinger, Swiss curler
- Sandra Ramstein-Attinger, Swiss curler
- Victor Attinger (1856–1927), Swiss publisher and photographer
- Werner Attinger, Swiss curler

== See also ==
- Attinger family, Swiss family of printers and publishers
