= Roxin =

Roxin is a Swedish surname. Notable people with the surname include:

- Björn Roxin (born 1950), Swedish curler
- Claes Roxin (born 1951), Swedish curler
- Claus Roxin (1931–2025), German jurist
- Göran Roxin (born 1951), Swedish curler, twin brother of Claes
- Lars-Eric Roxin (born 1945), Swedish curler
