= Huguette Jullien =

French curler

- Curler ♀

Team
- Curling club: Mont d'Arbois CC, Megève, Club de sports Megève, Megève

Curling career
- Member Association: France
- World Championship: 7 (1979, 1980, 1982, 1983, 1984, 1985, 1986)
- European Championship: 7 (1978, 1979, 1981, 1982, 1983, 1984, 1985)
Medal record
Curling

Huguette Jullien is a French curler.

At the international level, she competed for France on seven World and seven European championships.

== Teams ==
| Season | Skip | Third | Second | Lead | Events |
|---|---|---|---|---|---|
| 1978–79 | Paulette Delachat | Huguette Jullien | Suzanne Parodi | Erna Gay | ECC 1978 (4th) |
| 1978–79 | Erna Gay (fourth) | Paulette Delachat (skip) | Suzanne Parodi | Huguette Jullien | WCC 1979 (5th) |
| 1979–80 | Huguette Jullien | Suzanne Parodi | Jean Albert Sulpice (?) | Erna Gay | ECC 1979 (4th) |
| 1979–80 | Paulette Sulpice | Agnès Mercier | Huguette Jullien | Anne-Claude Wolfers | WCC 1980 (6th) |
| 1981–82 | Huguette Jullien (fourth) | Agnès Mercier | Paulette Sulpice (skip) | Anne-Claude Kennerson | ECC 1981 (5th) |
| 1981–82 | Huguette Jullien (fourth) | Agnès Mercier | Paulette Sulpice (skip) | Eva Duvillard | WCC 1982 (6th) |
| 1982–83 | Huguette Jullien (fourth) | Agnès Mercier | Paulette Sulpice (skip) | Monique Tournier | ECC 1982 (5th); WCC 1983 (5th) |
| 1983–84 | Huguette Jullien (fourth) | Agnès Mercier | Monique Tournier | Paulette Sulpice (skip) | ECC 1983 (6th) |
| 1983–84 | Huguette Jullien (fourth) | Agnès Mercier | Andrée Dupont-Roc | Paulette Sulpice (skip) | WCC 1984 (7th) |
| 1984–85 | Huguette Jullien (fourth) | Andrée Dupont-Roc | Paulette Sulpice (skip) | Monique Tournier | ECC 1984 (6th) |
| 1984–85 | Huguette Jullien (fourth) | Paulette Sulpice (skip) | Andrée Dupont-Roc | Jocelyn Lhenry | WCC 1985 (8th) |
| 1985–86 | Paulette Sulpice | Huguette Jullien | Isabelle Quere | Jocelyn Lhenry | ECC 1985 (10th) |
| 1985–86 | Huguette Jullien (fourth) | Paulette Sulpice (skip) | Isabelle Quere | Jocelyn Lhenry | WCC 1986 (9th) |
