= Paulette Sulpice =

French curler

- Curler ♀
- Born: Paulette Delachat

Team
- Curling club: Mont d'Arbois CC, Megève, Club de sports Megève, Megève

Curling career
- Member Association: France
- World Championship: 7 (1979, 1980, 1982, 1983, 1984, 1985, 1986, 1990)
- European Championship: 10 (1975, 1976, 1977, 1978, 1981, 1982, 1983, 1984, 1985, 1989)
Medal record
Curling
European Championships
Silver medal – second place	1976 West Berlin
French Women's Championship
Gold medal – first place	1975
Gold medal – first place	1976
Gold medal – first place	1977
Gold medal – first place	1978
Gold medal – first place	1979
Gold medal – first place	1980
Gold medal – first place	1982
Gold medal – first place	1983
Gold medal – first place	1984
Gold medal – first place	1985

Paulette Sulpice (born as Paulette Delachat, also known as Paulette Delachat-Sulpice) is a French curler.

At the international level, she is a 1976 European silver medallist.

At the national level, she is a ten time French women's champion curler (1975, 1976, 1977, 1978, 1979, 1980, 1982, 1983, 1984, 1985).

== Teams ==
Season	Skip	Third	Second	Lead	Alternate	Events
1975–76	Paulette Delachat	Suzanne Parodi	Erna Gay	Francoise Duclos		ECC 1975 (4th)
1976–77	Paulette Delachat	Suzanne Parodi	Erna Gay	Francoise Duclos		ECC 1976 (silver)
1977–78	Paulette Delachat	Suzanne Parodi	Erna Gay	Francoise Duclos		ECC 1977 (4th)
1978–79	Paulette Delachat	Huguette Jullien	Suzanne Parodi	Erna Gay		ECC 1978 (4th)
1978–79	Erna Gay (fourth)	Paulette Delachat (skip)	Suzanne Parodi	Huguette Jullien		WCC 1979 (5th)
1979–80	Paulette Sulpice	Agnès Mercier	Huguette Jullien	Anne-Claude Wolfers		WCC 1980 (6th)
1981–82	Huguette Jullien (fourth)	Agnès Mercier	Paulette Sulpice (skip)	Anne-Claude Kennerson		ECC 1981 (5th)
1981–82	Huguette Jullien (fourth)	Agnès Mercier	Paulette Sulpice (skip)	Eva Duvillard		WCC 1982 (6th)
1982–83	Huguette Jullien (fourth)	Agnès Mercier	Paulette Sulpice (skip)	Monique Tournier		ECC 1982 (5th); WCC 1983 (5th)
1983–84	Huguette Jullien (fourth)	Agnès Mercier	Monique Tournier	Paulette Sulpice (skip)		ECC 1983 (6th)
1983–84	Huguette Jullien (fourth)	Agnès Mercier	Andrée Dupont-Roc	Paulette Sulpice (skip)		WCC 1984 (7th)
1984–85	Huguette Jullien (fourth)	Andrée Dupont-Roc	Paulette Sulpice (skip)	Monique Tournier		ECC 1984 (6th)
1984–85	Huguette Jullien (fourth)	Paulette Sulpice (skip)	Andrée Dupont-Roc	Jocelyn Lhenry		WCC 1985 (8th)
1985–86	Paulette Sulpice	Huguette Jullien	Isabelle Quere	Jocelyn Lhenry		ECC 1985 (10th)
1985–86	Huguette Jullien (fourth)	Paulette Sulpice (skip)	Isabelle Quere	Jocelyn Lhenry		WCC 1986 (9th)
1989–90	Paulette Sulpice	Brigitte Lamy	Jocelyn Lhenry	Guylaine Fratucello		ECC 1989 (7th)
1989–90	Brigitte Lamy	Paulette Sulpice	Jocelyn Lhenry	Guylaine Fratucello	Annick Mercier	WCC 1990 (9th)
