= Sandrine Morand =

French curler (born 1979)

- Curler ♀
- Born: 11 April 1979 (age 47)

Team
- Curling club: Megève CC, Megève

Curling career
- Member Association: France
- World Championship: 1 (2000)
- World Mixed Doubles Championship: 3 (2016, 2017, 2018)
- European Championship: 10 (1999, 2000, 2001, 2002, 2003, 2004, 2005, 2006, 2007, 2008)
- Other appearances: World Mixed Championship: 2 (2015, 2018), World Junior Championships: 4 (1997, 1998, 1999, 2000)
Medal record
Curling
French Women's Championship
| Gold medal – first place | 2000 |
| Gold medal – first place | 2001 |
| Gold medal – first place | 2002 |
| Gold medal – first place | 2003 |
| Gold medal – first place | 2004 |
| Gold medal – first place | 2005 |
| Gold medal – first place | 2008 |

Sandrine Morand (born 11 April 1979) is a French female curler.

At the national level, she is a seven-time French women's champion curler (2000, 2001, 2002, 2003, 2004, 2005, 2008).

== Teams ==
=== Women's ===
| Season | Skip | Third | Second | Lead | Alternate | Coach | Events |
|---|---|---|---|---|---|---|---|
| 1996–97 | Nadia Bénier | Audé Bénier | Laure Mutazzi | Stéphanie Jaccaz | Sandrine Morand | | WJCC 1997 (9th) |
| 1997–98 | Audé Bénier | Laure Mutazzi | Stéphanie Jaccaz | Sandrine Morand | Julie Berthet | | WJCC 1998 (7th) |
| 1998–99 | Audé Bénier | Laure Mutazzi | Stéphanie Jaccaz | Sandrine Morand | Julie Berthet | | WJCC 1999 (7th) |
| 1999–00 | Audé Bénier | Stéphanie Jaccaz | Fabienne Morand | Tatiana Ducroz | Sandrine Morand | Nadia Bénier | ECC 1999 (7th) |
| 1999–00 | Sandrine Morand | Chloé Sanson | Caroline Saint-Cricq | Johanna Pecherand-Charmet | Laëtitia Arvin-Berod | Thierry Mercier | WJCC 2000 (10th) |
| 1999–00 | Audé Bénier | Stéphanie Jaccaz | Fabienne Morand | Sandrine Morand | Laure Mutazzi | | WCC 2000 (10th) |
| 2000–01 | Sandrine Morand | Audrey Delphino | Delphine Bredannaz | Melanie Sturm | Stéphanie Jaccaz | Agnes Mercier | ECC 2000 (8th) |
| 2001–02 | Sandrine Morand | Delphine Bredannaz | Audrey Delphino | Melanie Sturm | | Bruno-Denis Dubois | ECC 2001 (10th) |
| 2002–03 | Sandrine Morand | Catherine Lefebvre | Audrey Delphino | Sophie Favre-Félix | Frédérique Jacob | | ECC 2002 (10th) |
| 2003–04 | Sandrine Morand | Catherine Lefebvre | Audrey Delphino | Sophie Favre-Félix | Frédérique Jacob | Robert Biondina | ECC 2003 (12th) |
| 2004–05 | Sandrine Morand | Catherine Lefebvre | Jocelyn Cault-Lhenry | Sophie Favre-Félix | Caroline Saint-Cricq | Robert Biondina | ECC 2004 (13th) |
| 2005–06 | Sandrine Morand | Catherine Lefebvre | Caroline Saint-Cricq | Delphine Charlet | Jocelyn Cault-Lhenry | Alain Contat | ECC 2005 (15th) |
| 2006–07 | Sandrine Morand | Karine Baechelen | Delphine Charlet | Alexandra Seimbille | Brigitte Mathieu | | ECC 2006 (15th) |
| 2007–08 | Sandrine Morand | Karine Baechelen | Delphine Charlet | Brigitte Mathieu | Alexandra Seimbille | Julien Charlet | ECC 2007 (13th) |
| 2008–09 | Sandrine Morand | Delphine Charlet | Brigitte Mathieu | Alexandra Seimbille | Pauline Jeanneret | Julien Charlet | ECC 2008 (20th) |

=== Mixed ===
| Season | Skip | Third | Second | Lead | Events |
|---|---|---|---|---|---|
| 2015–16 | Thierry Mercier | Sandrine Morand | Romain Borini | Catherine Emberger | WMxCC 2015 (15th) |
| 2018–19 | Romain Borini | Sandrine Morand | David Baumgartner | Manon Humbert | WMxCC 2018 (23rd) |

=== Mixed doubles ===
| Season | Male | Female | Coach | Events |
|---|---|---|---|---|
| 2015–16 | Romain Borini | Sandrine Morand | Alain Bliggenstorfer | WMDCC 2016 (27th) |
| 2016–17 | Romain Borini | Sandrine Morand | Alain Bliggenstorfer | WMDCC 2017 (31st) |
| 2017–18 | Romain Borini | Sandrine Morand | Chrislain Razafimahefa | WMDCC 2018 (19th) |
