= Pauline Jeanneret =

French curler (born 1987)

- Curler ♀
- Born: 1 March 1987 (age 39)

Team
- Curling club: Besançon Skating Club, Besançon

Curling career
- Member Association: France
- World Mixed Doubles Championship: 2 (2011, 2013)
- European Championship: 3 (2008, 2011, 2015)
- Other appearances: European Junior Challenge: 1 (2008)
Medal record
Curling
World Mixed Doubles Championship
Bronze medal – third place	2011 St. Paul
French Women's Championship
Gold medal – first place	2013
Gold medal – first place	2014
Gold medal – first place	2015

Pauline Jeanneret (born 1 March 1987) is a French curler. She is a 2011 World mixed doubles bronze medallist.

== Teams ==
=== Women's ===
Season	Skip	Third	Second	Lead	Alternate	Coach	Events
2007–08	Marie Coulot (fourth)	Solène Coulot (skip)	Pauline Jeanneret	Anna Li	Manon Humbert	Wilfrid Coulot	EJCC 2008 (4th)
2008–09	Sandrine Morand	Delphine Charlet	Brigitte Mathieu	Alexandra Seimbille	Pauline Jeanneret	Julien Charlet	ECC 2008 (20th)
2010–11	Anna Li	Pauline Jeanneret	Marie Coulot	Salomé Bourny		Lionel Roux	ECC 2011 (C group) (bronze)
2015–16	Pauline Jeanneret	Manon Humbert	Malaurie Boissenin	Elisa Pagnier	Axelle Chiffre	Chrislian Razafimahefa	ECC 2015 (19th)
2018–19	Pauline Jeanneret	Mari Hansen	Janina Lindström	Laura Kitti	Arja Aho		
2026–27	Anna Li-Marchetti (Fourth)	Pauline Jeanneret (Skip)	Mathilde Rossi	Delphine Charlet	Chana Beitone	Laurence Bidaud	2026 World Qualifier

=== Mixed doubles ===
Season	Male	Female	Coach	Events
2010–11	Amaury Pernette	Pauline Jeanneret	Thomas Dufour	FMDCC 2010 (gold); WMDCC 2011 (bronze)
2012–13	Romain Borini	Pauline Jeanneret	Thomas Dufour	WMDCC 2013 (20th)
