= Géraldine Girod =

French curler (born 1970)

- Curler ♀
- Born: 24 February 1970 (age 56); Chamonix

Team
- Curling club: Club de sports Megève, Megève, Club de sports Chamonix (Chamonix)

Curling career
- Member Association: France
- European Championship: 3 (1990, 1991, 1992)
- Olympic: 1 (1992 - demo)
- Other appearances: World Junior Championships: 4 (1988, 1989, 1990, 1991), European Junior Championships: 2 (1986, 1987)
Medal record
Curling

Géraldine Girod (born 24 February 1970 in Chamonix) is a French curler.

She participated in the demonstration curling events at the 1992 Winter Olympics, where the French women's team finished in seventh place.

== Teams ==
Season	Skip	Third	Second	Lead	Alternate	Events
1985–86	Véronique Girod	Géraldine Girod	Chrystelle Fournier	Karine Caux		EJCCh 1986 (7th)
1986–87	Véronique Girod	Géraldine Girod	Chrystelle Fournier	Karine Caux		EJCCh 1987 (7th)
1987–88	Karine Caux (fourth)	Géraldine Girod (skip)	Chrystelle Fournier	Véronique Girod		WJCC 1988 (7th)
1988–89	Karine Caux	Laurence Bibollet	Chrystelle Fournier	Véronique Girod	Géraldine Girod	WJCC 1989 (8th)
1989–90	Karine Caux (fourth)	Laurence Bibollet (skip)	Chrystelle Fournier	Véronique Girod	Géraldine Girod	WJCC 1990 (7th)
1990–91	Karine Caux	Laurence Bibollet	Géraldine Girod	Chrystelle Fournier		ECC 1990 (8th)
1990–91	Karine Caux	Chrystelle Fournier	Géraldine Girod	Tania Ducroz	Helene Ducroz	WJCC 1991 (7th)
1991–92	Annick Mercier	Brigitte Lamy	Claire Niatel	Brigitte Collard	Géraldine Girod	ECC 1991 (7th)
1991–92	Annick Mercier	Brigitte Lamy	Géraldine Girod	Claire Niatel	Brigitte Collard	WOG 1992 (demo) (7th)
1992–93	Annick Mercier	Catherine Lefebvre	Géraldine Girod	Claire Niatel		ECC 1992 (10th)
