= Manon Humbert =

French curler (born 1989)

- Curler ♀
- Born: 11 April 1989 (age 37)

Team
- Curling club: Besançon Skating Club, Besançon

Curling career
- Member Association: France
- World Mixed Doubles Championship: 1 (2019)
- European Championship: 1 (2015)
- Other appearances: World Mixed Championship: 1 (2018), World Junior Championships: 2 (2009, 2010), European Junior Challenge: 2 (2008, 2009)
Medal record
Curling
French Women's Championship
Gold medal – first place	2009
Gold medal – first place	2010
Gold medal – first place	2011
Gold medal – first place	2013
Gold medal – first place	2014
Gold medal – first place	2015
Gold medal – first place	2016

Manon Humbert (born 11 April 1989) is a French female curler.

At the national level, she is a seven-time French women's champion curler (2009, 2010, 2011, 2013, 2014, 2015, 2016), 2016 French mixed doubles bronze medallist and two-time French junior champion curler (2007, 2008).

== Teams ==
=== Women's ===
Season	Skip	Third	Second	Lead	Alternate	Coach	Events
2007–08	Marie Coulot (fourth)	Solène Coulot (skip)	Pauline Jeanneret	Anna Li	Manon Humbert	Wilfrid Coulot	EJCC 2008 (4th)
2008–09	Marie Coulot	Solène Coulot	Anna Li	Manon Humbert	Anne-Claire Beaubestre (WJCC)	Wilfrid Coulot (EJCC, WJCC), Edouard Amiot (EJCC)	EJCC 2009 (gold); WJCC 2009 (9th)
2009–10	Marie Coulot	Aurélie Baliff	Anna Li	Manon Humbert		Wilfrid Coulot	WJCC 2010 (6th)
2015–16	Pauline Jeanneret	Manon Humbert	Malaurie Boissenin	Elisa Pagnier	Axelle Chiffre	Chrislian Razafimahefa	ECC 2015 (19th)

=== Mixed ===
Season	Skip	Third	Second	Lead	Events
2018–19	Romain Borini	Sandrine Morand	David Baumgartner	Manon Humbert	WMxCC 2018 (23rd)

=== Mixed doubles ===
Season	Male	Female	Coach	Events
2015–16	David Baumgartner	Manon Humbert		FMDCC 2016 (bronze)
2018–19	David Baumgartner	Manon Humbert	Chrislain Razafimahefa	WMDCC 2019 (35th)
