= Brigitte Lamy =

French curler (born 1950)

- Curler ♀
- Born: 28 December 1950 (age 75); Épinal

Team
- Curling club: Club de sports Megève, Megève

Curling career
- Member Association: France
- World Championship: 3 (1990, 1991, 1995)
- European Championship: 3 (1989, 1991, 1994)
- Olympic: 1 (1992 - demo event)
Medal record
Curling
French Women's Championship
Gold medal – first place	1989

Brigitte Lamy (born 28 December 1950 in Épinal) is a French curler.

She participated in the demonstration curling event at the 1992 Winter Olympics, where the French women's team finished in seventh place.

At the national level, she is a French women's champion curler (1989).

== Teams ==
Season	Skip	Third	Second	Lead	Alternate	Coach	Events
1989–90	Paulette Sulpice	Brigitte Lamy	Jocelyn Lhenry	Guylaine Fratucello			ECC 1989 (7th)
1989–90	Brigitte Lamy	Paulette Sulpice	Jocelyn Lhenry	Guylaine Fratucello	Annick Mercier		WCC 1990 (9th)
1990–91	Annick Mercier	Catherine Lefebvre	Brigitte Lamy	Claire Niatel	Brigitte Collard		WCC 1991 (8th)
1991–92	Annick Mercier	Brigitte Lamy	Claire Niatel	Brigitte Collard	Géraldine Girod		ECC 1991 (7th)
1991–92	Annick Mercier	Brigitte Lamy	Géraldine Girod	Claire Niatel	Brigitte Collard		WOG 1992 (demo) (7th)
1994–95	Brigitte Lamy	Jocelyn Lhenry	Gaetane Bibollet	Brigitte Collard	Laurence Prunet	Heidi Schlapbach	ECC 1994 (7th)
1994–95	Brigitte Lamy	Jocelyn Cault-Lhenry	Gaetane Bibollet	Brigitte Collard	Tatiana Ducroz		WCC 1995 (10th)
