= 2005 World Senior Curling Championships =

- Host city: Howwood, Scotland
- Arena: Greenacres Curling Club
- Dates: March 19–26
- Men's winner: Canada
- Skip: Bas Buckle
- Third: Bob Freeman
- Second: Gerry Young
- Lead: Harvey Holloway
- Finalist: United States (David Russell)
- Women's winner: Scotland
- Skip: Carolyn Morris
- Third: Pat Lockhart
- Second: Jeanette Johnston
- Lead: Linda Lesperance
- Alternate: Catherine Edington
- Coach: Trudie Milne
- Finalist: Japan (Hatomi Nagaoka)

The 2005 World Senior Curling Championships were held from March 19 to 26 at the Greenacres Curling Club in Howwood, Scotland.

Group A of each gender consisted of the best ranked countries from the previous year. The three best teams of the A-groups advanced to the semi-finals as well as the winner of the B-groups. The top ranked team in A played against the top ranked team in B, the winner went on to the gold medal game and the loser went on to the bronze medal game. The 2nd place team in A played against the 3rd place team in A, and the winner went on to the gold medal game and the loser went on to the bronze medal game.

== Men ==
=== Teams ===
Country	Skip	Third	Second	Lead	Alternate	Coach	Curling club
Australia	Lloyd Roberts	Tom Kidd	Jim Oastler	Neil Galbraith			
Canada	Bas Buckle	Bob Freeman	Gerry Young	Harvey Holloway			
Denmark	John Hansen	Leif Højbjerg	Peter Gram	Ole Bering			
England	D. Michael Sutherland	John Brown	John MacDougall	Robin Gemmell	Alan Collette		
Finland	Timo Kauste	Kai Pahl	Yrjö Franssila	Seppo Malinen	Mauno Nummila	Olli Rissanen	
France	Maurice Arozamena	Christophe Lehuenen	Jean Porquet	Pierre Perrin		Irénée Gaudreau	
Germany	Klaus Unterstab	Reinhard Oelschläger	Thomas Frey	Joachim Hagen	Werner Pflaum	Elke Unterstab	
Iceland	Gisli Kristinsson	Hallgrimur Valsson	Sigurgeir Haraldsson	Agust Hilmarsson	Júlíus Arason	Jón Hansen	
Ireland	Tony Tierney	Jim Winning	John Burns	Gordon McIntyre	David McClure		
Italy	Dino Zardini	Enrico Alberti	Roberto Fassina	Valerio Constantini	Angelo Pezzin		
Japan	Satoru Asakawa	Toshiyuki Numati	Yutaka Matsuura	Katsuo Hara	Yoshiji Matsushita		
Netherlands	Rob Boymans	Peter Postma	John Paulissen	Gerrit-Jan Scholten	Joep Waijers	Alie Kramer	
New Zealand	Peter Becker	John Campbell	John Allen	John Sanders			
Norway	Tormod Andreassen	Jan Kolstad	Sverre Sandbakken	Olaf Carlem			
Scotland	Robert Smellie	Jimmy Barr	Ian Gibb	Harry Johnston	James Stevenson		
Sweden	Jan Lundblad	Sune Halvarson	Lennart Jakobsson	Per Göstas	Åke Näs		Leksands CK
Switzerland	Peter Attinger Jr.	Bernhard Attinger	Mattias Neuenschwander	Jürg Geiler	Simon Roth		Dübendorf CC
United States	David Russell	Bill Rhyme	Mark Swandby	David Carlson	Bill Kind		
Wales	Peter Williams	Scott Lyon	Ray King	Peter Hodgkinson			

=== Round robin ===
==== Group A ====
Place	Team	1	2	3	4	5	6	7	8	9	Wins	Losses
1	United States	*	6:5	5:8	4:3	5:7	8:7	8:7	8:3	7:6	6	2
2	Canada	5:6	*	8:3	4:9	8:2	5:2	5:7	11:4	8:1	5	3
3	Switzerland	8:5	3:8	*	4:8	6:7	8:3	8:6	12:6	6:5	5	3
4	Sweden	3:4	9:4	8:4	*	5:4	5:6	8:4	3:5	6:5	5	3
5	Germany	7:5	2:8	7:6	4:5	*	2:10	10:2	10:5	7:4	5	3
6	Norway	7:8	2:5	3:8	6:5	10:2	*	10:4	11:6	4:7	4	4
7	Scotland	7:8	7:5	6:8	4:8	2:10	4:10	*	10:1	9:5	3	5
8	Denmark	3:8	4:11	6:12	5:3	5:10	6:11	1:10	*	5:4	2	6
9	Finland	6:7	1:8	5:6	5:6	4:7	7:4	5:9	4:5	*	1	7

==== Group B ====
Place	Team	1	2	3	4	5	6	7	8	9	10	Wins	Losses
1	England	*	8:6	4:8	5:8	6:3	9:8	9:1	8:5	11:7	9:4	7	2
2	Ireland	6:8	*	8:7	8:6	4:5	8:12	7:6	9:3	7:3	10:4	6	3
3	France	8:4	7:8	*	7:5	1:11	7:2	9:5	8:3	7:5	9:10	6	3
4	Italy	8:5	6:8	5:7	*	14:5	7:6	1:13	5:11	9:4	8:2	5	4
5	Wales	3:6	5:4	11:1	5:14	*	7:6	8:7	7:6	4:8	5:6	5	4
6	New Zealand	8:9	12:8	2:7	6:7	6:7	*	8:4	16:0	16:3	6:4	5	4
7	Japan	1:9	6:7	5:9	13:1	7:8	4:8	*	7:3	7:6	9:3	4	5
8	Netherlands	5:8	3:9	3:8	11:5	6:7	0:16	3:7	*	7:6	8:6	3	6
9	Iceland	7:11	3:7	5:7	4:9	8:4	3:16	6:7	6:7	*	6:5	2	7
10	Australia	4:9	4:10	10:9	2:8	6:5	4:6	3:9	6:8	5:6	*	2	7

Teams to playoffs
Teams to tiebreaker

==== Tiebreaker ====
Sheet A	1	2	3	4	5	6	7	8	9	Final
Canada	0	2	0	1	0	1	0	2	1	7
Germany 🔨	1	0	2	0	2	0	1	0	0	6

Sheet B	1	2	3	4	5	6	7	8	Final
Switzerland 🔨	3	0	0	0	0	3	1	X	7
Sweden	0	1	1	1	0	0	0	X	3

=== Playoffs ===
Semi-final
A-1	United States	4
B-1	England	2
A-2	Canada	8
A-3	Switzerland	4

Final
United States	4
Canada	5
Bronze medal game
England	2
Switzerland	5

Semi-finals
March 25, 19:00

Sheet A	1	2	3	4	5	6	7	8	Final
Canada 🔨	2	3	0	1	1	0	0	1	8
Switzerland	0	0	1	0	0	2	1	0	4

Sheet D	1	2	3	4	5	6	7	8	Final
United States	0	0	0	0	2	1	0	1	4
England 🔨	0	1	0	0	0	0	1	0	2

Bronze medal game
March 26, 9:30

Sheet B	1	2	3	4	5	6	7	8	Final
Switzerland	2	0	0	0	1	0	1	1	5
England 🔨	0	0	1	0	0	1	0	0	2

Final
March 26, 14:00

Sheet B	1	2	3	4	5	6	7	8	Final
United States	0	1	0	0	1	0	2	0	4
Canada 🔨	1	0	1	0	0	2	0	1	5

=== Final standings ===
Place	Team	Games played	Wins	Losses
1st place, gold medalist(s)	Canada	11	8	3
2nd place, silver medalist(s)	United States	10	7	3
3rd place, bronze medalist(s)	Switzerland	11	7	4
4	England	11	7	4
5	Sweden	9	5	4
6	Germany	9	5	4
7	Norway	8	4	4
8	Scotland	8	3	5
9	Denmark	8	2	6
10	Finland	8	1	7
11	Ireland	9	6	3
12	France	9	6	3
13	Italy	9	5	4
14	Wales	9	5	4
15	New Zealand	9	5	4
16	Japan	9	4	5
17	Netherlands	9	3	6
18	Iceland	9	2	7
19	Australia	9	2	7

== Women ==
=== Teams ===
Country	Skip	Third	Second	Lead	Alternate	Coach	Curling club
Canada	Anne Dunn	Lindy Marchuk	Gloria Campbell	Fran Todd	Carol Thompson		
England	Joan Reed	Glynnice Lauder	Venetia Scott	Moira Davison	Mary Aitchison		Glendale CC, Northumberland
Finland	Helena Timonen	Mimmi Koivula	Terttu Pakarinen	Kirsti Kauste	Pirjo Hautanen		
Germany	Karin Diekmann	Carola Murek	Brigitte Harmsen	Gisela Horn-Moll	Brigitta Paatz-Neuhaus	Moritz Diekmann	
Ireland	Fiona Turnbull	Marie O'Kane	Jane Moira Paterson	Kathleen Nixon	Isobel Fyfe	James Beckett	
Italy	Ann Urquhart	Maria-Grazzia Lacedelli	Tea Savoia	Franca Faccin	Mafalda Hauseberger		
Japan	Hatomi Nagaoka	Shigeko Sato	Hiroko Oishi	Emiko Zareo	Noriko Kaneuchi		
Netherlands	Beatrice Miltenburg	Marijke Paulissen-Walschots	Sylvia Van Der Pluijm	Wil Kerkvliet			
New Zealand	Liz Matthews	Pauline Farra	Christine Bewick	Cathy Fenton	Wendy Becker		
Scotland	Carolyn Morris	Pat Lockhart	Jeanette Johnston	Linda Lesperance	Catherine Edington	Trudie Milne	
Sweden	Ingrid Meldahl	Ann-Catrin Kjerr	Inger Berg	Sylvia Malmberg	Birgitta Törn	Gunilla Bergman	Stocksunds CK, Stockholm
Switzerland	Renate Nedkoff	Lotti Pieper	Silvia Niederer	Brigitta Keller			
United States	Anne Wiggins	Jean Murphy	Carol White	Rosemary Morgan	Carolyn MacLeod	Faith Lundgren	

=== Round robin ===
==== Group A ====
Place	Team	1	2	3	4	5	6	Wins	Losses
1	Canada	*	7:6	12:3	9:2	7:4	9:3	5	0
2	Sweden	6:7	*	7:8	7:5	9:7	8:6	3	2
3	Japan	3:12	8:7	*	1:11	5:8	6:4	2	3
4	Switzerland	2:9	5:7	11:1	*	8:7	2:10	2	3
5	England	4:7	7:9	8:5	7:8	*	8:5	2	3
6	United States	3:9	6:8	4:6	10:2	5:8	*	1	4

==== Group B ====
Place	Team	1	2	3	4	5	6	7	Wins	Losses
1	Netherlands	*	9:6	7:6	4:7	14:1	8:5	12:2	5	1
2	Scotland	6:9	*	7:2	6:4	10:1	9:5	11:1	5	1
3	Finland	6:7	2:7	*	7:2	13:1	6:5	7:3	4	2
4	Ireland	7:4	4:6	2:7	*	7:2	3:7	10:4	3	3
5	Germany	1:14	1:10	1:13	2:7	*	8:4	8:6	2	4
6	Italy	5:8	5:9	5:6	7:3	4:8	*	18:4	2	4
7	New Zealand	2:12	1:11	3:7	4:10	6:8	4:18	*	0	6

Teams to playoffs
Teams to tiebreaker

==== Tiebreaker ====
March 25, 8:30

Sheet A	1	2	3	4	5	6	7	8	Final
England	0	0	0	0	0	0	X	X	0
Japan 🔨	2	1	2	1	1	1	X	X	8

Sheet C	1	2	3	4	5	6	7	8	Final
Scotland 🔨	2	2	0	0	0	4	1	X	9
Netherlands	0	0	1	2	1	0	0	X	4

March 25, 12:30

Sheet D	1	2	3	4	5	6	7	8	Final
Switzerland 🔨	1	0	0	1	0	0	0	X	2
Japan	0	3	2	0	1	2	2	X	10

=== Playoffs ===
Semi-final
A-1	Canada	5
B-1	Scotland	11
A-2	Sweden	6
A-3	Japan	9

Final
Scotland	9
Japan	5
Bronze medal game
Canada	4
Sweden	7

Semi-finals
March 25, 19:00

Sheet B	1	2	3	4	5	6	7	8	Final
Scotland 🔨	3	2	0	0	3	1	0	X	11
Canada	0	0	1	2	0	0	2	X	5

Sheet C	1	2	3	4	5	6	7	8	Final
Sweden 🔨	0	2	2	0	0	2	0	0	6
Japan	4	0	0	2	1	0	1	1	9

Bronze medal game
March 26, 9:30

Sheet C	1	2	3	4	5	6	7	8	Final
Canada	0	1	0	1	0	0	2	0	4
Sweden 🔨	1	0	1	0	2	2	0	1	7

Final
March 26, 19:00

Sheet B	1	2	3	4	5	6	7	8	Final
Scotland	1	0	1	0	1	0	3	3	9
Japan 🔨	0	1	0	2	0	2	0	0	5

=== Final standings ===
Place	Team	Games played	Wins	Losses
1st place, gold medalist(s)	Scotland	9	8	1
2nd place, silver medalist(s)	Japan	9	5	4
3rd place, bronze medalist(s)	Sweden	7	4	3
4	Canada	7	5	2
5	Switzerland	6	2	4
6	England	6	2	4
7	United States	5	1	4
8	Netherlands	7	5	2
9	Finland	6	4	2
10	Ireland	6	3	3
11	Germany	6	2	4
12	Italy	6	2	4
13	New Zealand	6	0	6
