= Jürg Geiler =

Swiss curler

- Curler ♂

Team
- Curling club: CC Dübendorf, Dübendorf

Curling career
- Member Association: Switzerland
- World Championship: 1 (1974)
- Other appearances: World Senior Championships: 1 (2005)
Medal record
Curling
World Championships
Bronze medal – third place	1974 Bern
Swiss Men's Championship
Gold medal – first place	1974 Wallisellen

Jürg Geiler is a former Swiss curler.

He is a 1974 World Men's bronze medallist and a 1974 Swiss men's champion.

== Teams ==
Season	Skip	Third	Second	Lead	Alternate	Events
1971–72	Bernhard Attinger	Peter Attinger Jr.	Mattias Neuenschwander	Jürg Geiler		SJCC 1972 (gold)
1972–73	Peter Attinger Jr.	Bernhard Attinger	Mattias Neuenschwander	Jürg Geiler		SJCC 1973 (gold)
1973–74	Peter Attinger Jr.	Bernhard Attinger	Mattias Neuenschwander	Jürg Geiler		SMCC 1974 (gold); WCC 1974 (bronze)
2004–05	Peter Attinger Jr.	Bernhard Attinger	Mattias Neuenschwander	Jürg Geiler	Simon Roth	WSCC 2005 (bronze)
