= Bob Martin (curler) =

English male curler

- Curler ♂

Team
- Curling club: Province of London CC, London)

Curling career
- Member Association: England
- World Championship: 2 (1985, 1987)
- European Championship: 4 (1981, 1984, 1985, 1986)

Bob Martin (born c. 1953) is a Scottish-English male curler.

At the national level, he is a four-time English men's champion curler (1982, 1984, 1985, 1986).

== Teams ==
Season	Skip	Third	Second	Lead	Events
1981–82	Bob Martin	Ronald D. Thornton	John D. Kerr	Michael Thompson	ECC 1981 (9th)
1981–82	Bob Martin	Ronnie Brock	John Brown	Duncan Stewart	EngMCC 1982 (gold)
1983–84	Bob Martin	Ronnie Brock	Ian Coutts	Duncan Stewart	EngMCC 1984 (gold)
1984–85	Bob Martin	Ronnie Brock	Ian Coutts	John Brown	ECC 1984 (5th); EngMCC 1985 (gold); WCC 1985 (10th)
1985–86	Bob Martin	Ronnie Brock	Ian Coutts	John Brown	ECC 1985 (7th)
1985–86	Bob Martin	Ronnie Brock	Robin Gemmell	John Brown	EngMCC 1986 (gold)
1986–87	Bob Martin	Ronnie Brock	Robin Gemmell	John Brown	ECC 1986 (10th)
1986–87	Bob Martin	Ronnie Brock	John Brown	Robin Gemmell	WCC 1987 (10th)

== Personal life ==
Martin is originally from Edinburgh. At the time of the 1985 World Championship, he was working in Abidjan, Ivory Coast as an accountant for an oil company. At the time of the 1987 Worlds, he was living in Fulham, and was married.
