= Daniel Streiff =

Swiss curler

- Curler ♂
- Other names: Danny

Team
- Curling club: Ronco s A., Stäfa CC (Stäfa)

Curling career
- Member Association: Switzerland
- World Championship: 1 (1987)
- European Championship: 1 (1986)
- Other appearances: World Junior Curling Championships: 1 (1978)
Medal record
Curling
European Championships
Gold medal – first place	1986 Copenhagen
Swiss Men's Championship
Gold medal – first place	1987

Daniel "Danny" Streiff (born c. 1960) is a former Swiss curler. He played second position on the Swiss rink that won the 1986 European Curling Championship.

He works as the president of the Ronco s A., Stäfa Curling Club. At the time of the 1987 World Championship, he was employed as a machine engineer.

== Teams ==
Season	Skip	Third	Second	Lead	Events
1977–78	Felix Luchsinger	Thomas Grendelmeier	Danny Streiff	Ueli Bernauer	SJCC 1978 (gold); WJCC 1978 (7th)
1986–87	Felix Luchsinger	Thomas Grendelmeier	Daniel Streiff	Fritz Luchsinger	ECC 1986 (gold); SMCC 1987 (gold); WCC 1987 (7th)
