= 1986 European Curling Championships =

- Host city: Copenhagen, Denmark
- Arena: Hvidovre Ice Rink
- Dates: 9–13 December
- Men's winner: Switzerland
- Skip: Felix Luchsinger
- Third: Thomas Grendelmeier
- Second: Daniel Steiff
- Lead: Fritz Luchsinger
- Finalist: Sweden (Göran Roxin)
- Women's winner: West Germany
- Skip: Andrea Schöpp
- Third: Almut Hege
- Second: Monika Wagner
- Lead: Elinore Schöpp
- Finalist: Switzerland (Liliane Raisin)

The 1986 European Curling Championships were held from 9 to 13 December at the Hvidovre Ice Rink arena in Copenhagen, Denmark.

The Swiss men's team skipped by Felix Luchsinger won their sixth title and the West German women's team skipped by Andrea Schöpp won their second title.

== Men ==
=== Teams ===
Country	Skip	Third	Second	Lead	Alternate	Curling club, city
Austria	Christian Wieser	Herwig Ritter	Thomas Wieser	Konrad Weiser		
Denmark	Tommy Stjerne	Per Berg	Peter Andersen	Ivan Frederiksen		Hvidovre CC, Hvidovre
England	Bob Martin	Ronnie Brock	Robin Gemmell	John Brown		
Finland	Jussi Uusipaavalniemi	Jarmo Jokivalli	Markku Uusipaavalniemi	Petri Tsutsunen	Juhani Heinonen	
France	Jean-Francois Orset	Claude Feige	Jean-Louis Sibuet	Marc Sibuet		
Italy	Andrea Pavani	Franco Sovilla	Fabio Alverà	Stefano Morona		
Netherlands	Wim Neeleman	Jeroen Tilman	Otto Veening	Floris van Imhoff		
Norway	Tormod Andreassen	Flemming Davanger	Stig-Arne Gunnestad	Kjell Berg		
Scotland	Lindsay Scotland	Richard Gray	Alistair Gray	Martin Brown		
Sweden	Göran Roxin	Claes Roxin	Björn Roxin	Lars-Eric Roxin	Anders Ehrling	CK Ena, Enköping
Switzerland	Felix Luchsinger	Thomas Grendelmeier	Daniel Steiff	Fritz Luchsinger		
Wales	John Stone	John Guyan	Michael Hunt	John Hunt		
West Germany	Roland Jentsch	Uli Sutor	Charlie Kapp	Thomas Vogelsang		

=== First Phase (Triple Knockout) ===
==== Round 1 ====
Two teams promoted to Second Phase

Game 1		Game 2		Game 3
		West Germany	9
Netherlands	10	Netherlands	7
Finland	8			West Germany	3
Denmark	10			Denmark	7
Wales	2	Denmark	6
Switzerland	8	Switzerland	5
Italy	3

Game 1
England	6
Austria	4
Scotland	8
France	3

Game 2
Sweden	10
England	5
Norway	6
Scotland	1

Game 3
Sweden	3
Norway	8

==== Round 2 ====
Three teams promoted to Second Phase

Game 1		Game 2		Game 3
				Sweden	4
				Italy	7
		Finland	4
Wales	5	Italy	8
Italy	6

Game 1		Game 2
		West Germany	3
Austria	4	France	7
France	7

Game 1		Game 2
Netherlands	2
Switzerland	9	Switzerland	6
England	3	Scotland	3
Scotland	8

==== Round 3 ====
Three teams promoted to Second Phase

Game 1		Game 2
		West Germany	9
England	5	England	4
Wales	2

Game 1		Game 2
		Scotland	4
Austria	7	Austria	3
Finland	6

Game 1
Sweden	7
Netherlands	5

=== Second Phase (Double Knockout) ===
==== Round 1 ====
Two teams promoted to Playoffs

Game 1
Denmark	4
Sweden	5
Italy	9
Scotland	6

Game 2
Sweden	7
Italy	4

Game 1
Switzerland	7
France	4
Norway	7
West Germany	5

Game 2
Switzerland	9
Norway	6

==== Round 2 ====
Two teams promoted to Playoffs

Game 1		Game 2
		Norway	6
Denmark	3	Scotland	3
Scotland	6

Game 1		Game 2
		Italy	6
France	5	West Germany	2
West Germany	6

=== Placement Phase ===
==== Range 9-13 ====
Quarterfinals (9-13)		Semifinals (9-13)		Final for 9th place
		England	7
Finland	7	Finland	6
Wales	6			England	2
				Austria	9
		Netherlands	5
		Austria	6

Semifinal (11-13)		Final for 11th place
		Finland	8
Netherlands	7	Wales	3
Wales	8

==== Range 5-8 ====
Final for 5th place
Scotland	6
West Germany	4

Final for 7th place
Denmark	3
France	2

=== Playoffs ===
Semifinals
1	Italy	2
4	Switzerland	9
2	Norway	4
3	Sweden	7

Final
Switzerland	8
Sweden	7
Bronze Medal Game
Italy	4
Norway	9

=== Final standings ===
Place	Country	Skip	Games	Wins	Losses
1st place, gold medalist(s)	Switzerland	Felix Luchsinger	8	7	1
2nd place, silver medalist(s)	Sweden	Göran Roxin	8	5	3
3rd place, bronze medalist(s)	Norway	Tormod Andreassen	7	5	2
4	Italy	Andrea Pavani	9	5	4
5	Scotland	Lindsay Scotland	9	5	4
6	West Germany	Roland Jentsch	8	3	5
7	Denmark	Tommy Stjerne	6	4	2
8	France	Jean-Francois Orset	6	2	4
9	Austria	Christian Wieser	6	3	3
10	England	Bob Martin	7	3	4
11	Finland	Jussi Uusipaavalniemi	6	2	4
12	Wales	John Stone	6	1	5
13	Netherlands	Wim Neeleman	6	1	5

== Women ==
=== Teams ===
Country	Skip	Third	Second	Lead	Curling club, city
Austria	Lilly Hummelt	Anna Egger	Andrea von Malberg	Jutta Kober	
Denmark	Maj-Brit Rejnholdt-Christensen	Jane Bidstrup	Hanne Olsen	Lone Bagge	Hvidovre CC, Hvidovre
England	Jean Picken	Lynda Clegg	Mary Finlay	Doris Vickers	
Finland	Taru Kivinen (fourth)	Jaana Jokela (skip)	Kirsi Jeskanen	Nina Ahvenainen	
France	Andrée Dupont-Roc (fourth)	Annick Mercier	Catherine Lefebvre	Agnes Mercier (skip)	
Italy	Maria-Grazzia Constantini	Ann Lacedelli	Tea Valt	Angela Constantini	
Netherlands	Laura Van Imhoff	Gerrie Veening	Jenny Bovenschen	Mirjam Gast	
Norway	Trine Trulsen	Dordi Nordby	Hanne Pettersen	Mette Halvorsen	Snarøyen CC, Oslo
Scotland	Gay Deas	Beryl Anita Harley	Jane Smith	Edna Nelson	
Sweden	Elisabeth Högström	Birgitta Sewik	Eva Andersson	Bitte Berg	Karlstads CK, Karlstad
Switzerland	Liliane Raisin	Claude Orizet	Carole Barbey	Beatrice Pochon	
Wales	Elizabeth Hunt	Margaret Guyan	Margaret Crawley	Jean Robinson	
West Germany	Andrea Schöpp	Almut Hege	Monika Wagner	Elinore Schöpp	

=== First Phase (Triple Knockout) ===
==== Round 1 ====
Two teams promoted to Second Phase

Game 1		Game 2		Game 3
		Switzerland	10
Italy	7	Finland	7
Finland	11			Switzerland	6
Denmark	8			Denmark	8
Wales	3	Denmark	4
Sweden	9	Sweden	3
England	5

Game 1
Austria	4
France	7
West Germany	8
Netherlands	4

Game 2
Scotland	11
France	9
Norway	7
West Germany	8

Game 3
Scotland	4
West Germany	8

==== Round 2 ====
Three teams promoted to Second Phase

Game 1		Game 2		Game 3
Wales	1
England	11	England	2
		Italy	9
				Italy	6
				Scotland	5

Game 1		Game 2
		Switzerland	10
Austria	9	Austria	5
Netherlands	8

Game 1		Game 2
Finland	9
Sweden	7	Finland	10
France	9	France	12
Norway	7

==== Round 3 ====
Three teams promoted to Second Phase

Game 1		Game 2
		Scotland	15
Norway	11	Norway	3
Wales	3

Game 1		Game 2
		Finland	4
England	4	Netherlands	9
Netherlands	10

Game 1
Austria	2
Sweden	11

=== Second Phase (Double Knockout) ===
==== Round 1 ====
Two teams promoted to Playoffs

Game 1
Denmark	7
Scotland	5
Italy	10
Netherlands	6

Game 2
Denmark	7
Italy	3

Game 1
Switzerland	6
France	7
West Germany	5
Sweden	3

Game 2
France	6
West Germany	7

==== Round 2 ====
Two teams promoted to Playoffs

Game 1		Game 2
		France	8
Scotland	7	Scotland	11
Netherlands	6

Game 1		Game 2
		Italy	8
Switzerland	7	Switzerland	9
Sweden	5

=== Placement Phase ===
==== Range 9-13 ====
Quarterfinal (9-13)
Italy	9
Netherlands	5

Semifinals (9-13)
Finland	12
England	9
Norway	12
Austria	0

Final

Semifinal (11-13)		Final for 11th place
		England	7
Austria	10	Austria	5
Wales	4

==== Range 5-8 ====
Final for 5th place
France	8
Italy	6

Final for 7th place
Netherlands	1
Sweden	9

=== Playoffs ===
Semifinals
1	West Germany	11
4	Scotland	2
2	Switzerland	2
3	Denmark	1

Final
West Germany	7
Switzerland	3
Bronze Medal Game
Scotland	4
Denmark	9

=== Final standings ===
Place	Country	Skip	Games	Wins	Losses
1st place, gold medalist(s)	West Germany	Andrea Schöpp	7	7	0
2nd place, silver medalist(s)	Switzerland	Liliane Raisin	8	5	3
3rd place, bronze medalist(s)	Denmark	Maj-Brit Rejnholdt-Christensen	7	6	1
4	Scotland	Gay Deas	9	4	5
5	France	Agnes Mercier	8	5	3
6	Italy	Maria-Grazzia Constantini	7	3	4
7	Sweden	Elisabeth Högström	7	3	4
8	Netherlands	Laura Van Imhoff	7	2	5
9	Norway	Trine Trulsen	6	3	3
10	Finland	Jaana Jokela	7	3	4
11	England	Jean Picken	7	3	4
12	Austria	Lilly Hummelt	7	2	5
13	Wales	Elizabeth Hunt	5	0	5
