= Mattias Neuenschwander =

Swiss male curler

- Curler ♂
- Other names: Matti

Team
- Curling club: CC Dübendorf, Dübendorf

Curling career
- Member Association: Switzerland
- World Championship: 2 (1974, 1979)
- European Championship: 1 (1976)
- Other appearances: World Senior Championships: 4 (2004, 2005, 2006, 2007)
Medal record
Curling
World Championships
Silver medal – second place	1979 Bern
Bronze medal – third place	1974 Bern
European Championships
Gold medal – first place	1976 West Berlin
Swiss Men's Championship
Gold medal – first place	1974
Gold medal – first place	1979
Silver medal – second place	1978
Silver medal – second place	1980
Silver medal – second place	1981

Mattias "Matti" Neuenschwander is a former Swiss curler. He played lead position on the Swiss rink that won two 1976 European Curling Championships and a silver medal at the 1979 World Men's Championship.

== Teams ==
Season	Skip	Third	Second	Lead	Alternate	Coach	Events
1971–72	Bernhard Attinger	Peter Attinger Jr.	Mattias Neuenschwander	Jürg Geiler			SJCC 1972 (gold)
1972–73	Peter Attinger Jr.	Bernhard Attinger	Mattias Neuenschwander	Jürg Geiler			SJCC 1973 (gold)
1973–74	Peter Attinger Jr.	Bernhard Attinger	Mattias Neuenschwander	Jürg Geiler			SMCC 1974 (gold); WCC 1974 (bronze)
1976–77	Peter Attinger Jr.	Bernhard Attinger	Mattias Neuenschwander	Ruedi Attinger			ECC 1976 (gold)
1977–78	Peter Attinger Jr.	Bernhard Attinger	Mattias Neuenschwander	Ruedi Attinger			SMCC 1978 (silver)
1978–79	Peter Attinger Jr.	Bernhard Attinger	Mattias Neuenschwander	Ruedi Attinger			SMCC 1979 (gold); WCC 1979 (silver)
1979–80	Peter Attinger Jr.	Bernhard Attinger	Mattias Neuenschwander	Kurt Attinger			SMCC 1980 (silver)
1980–81	Peter Attinger Jr.	Bernhard Attinger	Mattias Neuenschwander	Ruedi Attinger			SMCC 1981 (silver)
2003–04	Mattias Neuenschwander	Michael Müller	Heinz Kneubühler	Fritz Widmer	Peter Schneeberger		WSCC 2004 (bronze)
2004–05	Peter Attinger Jr.	Bernhard Attinger	Mattias Neuenschwander	Jürg Geiler	Simon Roth		WSCC 2005 (bronze)
2005–06	Mattias Neuenschwander	Bernhard Attinger	Peter Attinger Jr.	Anton Knobel			SSCC 2006 (gold)
2005–06	Peter Attinger Jr.	Mattias Neuenschwander	Bernhard Attinger	Tony Knobel	Fritz Widmer	Fritz Widmer	WSCC 2006 (5th)
2006–07	Mattias Neuenschwander	Michael Müller	Heinz Kneubühler	Marc Syfrig	Fritz Widmer		WSCC 2007 (11th)
2008–09	Mattias Neuenschwander	Michael Müller	Nicklaus Gartenmann	Marc Syfrig	Heinz Kneubühler		SSCC 2009 (bronze)
