= Werner Attinger =

Swiss curler

- Curler ♂

Team
- Curling club: CC Dübendorf, Dübendorf

Curling career
- Member Association: Switzerland
- World Championship: 1 (1984)
- European Championship: 4 (1984, 1988, 1996, 1998)
- Other appearances: World Senior Championships: 1 (2013)
Medal record
Curling
World Championships
Silver medal – second place	1984 Duluth
European Championships
Gold medal – first place	1984 Morzine
Bronze medal – third place	1988 Perth
Bronze medal – third place	1996 Copenhagen
Swiss Men's Championship
Gold medal – first place	1984
Silver medal – second place	1992
Silver medal – second place	1998
Bronze medal – third place	1987
Bronze medal – third place	1989
Bronze medal – third place	1990
Bronze medal – third place	1996
Bronze medal – third place	2001

Werner Attinger is a former Swiss curler. He played second position on the Swiss rink that won the 1984 European Curling Championships and a silver medal at the 1984 World Men's Championship.

== Teams ==
Season	Skip	Third	Second	Lead	Alternate	Coach	Events
1983–84	Peter Attinger Jr.	Bernhard Attinger	Werner Attinger	Kurt Attinger			SMCC 1984 (gold); WCC 1984 (silver)
1984–85	Peter Attinger Jr.	Bernhard Attinger	Werner Attinger	Kurt Attinger			ECC 1984 (gold)
1986–87	Peter Attinger Jr.	Werner Attinger	Martin Zürrer	Kurt Attinger			SMCC 1987 (bronze)
1988–89	Bernhard Attinger	Werner Attinger	Martin Zürrer	Marcel Senn			ECC 1988 (bronze); SMCC 1989 (bronze)
1989–90	Bernhard Attinger	Werner Attinger	Martin Zürrer	Marcel Senn			SMCC 1990 (bronze)
1991–92	Bernhard Attinger	Peter Attinger Jr.	Werner Attinger	Thomas Grendelmeier			SMCC 1992 (silver)
1995–96	Felix Luchsinger	Werner Attinger	Markus Foitek	Markus Luchsinger			SMCC 1996 (bronze)
1996–97	Felix Luchsinger	Werner Attinger	Markus Foitek	Markus Luchsinger	Thomas Grendelmeier	Frédéric Jean	ECC 1996 (bronze)
1997–98	Felix Luchsinger	Werner Attinger	Andreas Schwaller	Thomas Grendelmeier			SMCC 1998 (silver)
1998–99	Felix Luchsinger	Werner Attinger	Thomas Grendelmeier	Markus Luchsinger	Markus Foitek	Frédéric Jean	ECC 1998 (5th)
2000–01	Werner Attinger	Sacha Knobel	Markus Arnold	Thomas Kuhn	Christian Moser		SMCC 2001 (bronze)
2012–13	Werner Attinger	Peter Attinger Jr.	Ronny Müller	Tony Knobel	Bernhard Attinger (WSCC)		SSCC 2013 (gold); WSCC 2013 (bronze)
2014–15	Werner Attinger	Peter Attinger Jr.	Ronny Müller	Tony Knobel			SSCC 2015 (bronze)
2015–16	Werner Attinger	Peter Attinger Jr.	Ronny Müller	Tony Knobel			SSCC 2016 (silver)
2016–17	Werner Attinger	Peter Attinger Jr.	Ronald Müller	Marc Brügger	Tony Knobel		SSCC 2017 (silver)

== Private life ==
Werner Attinger grew up in a family of curlers. His father Peter Attinger Sr. is a 1972 Swiss men's champion. His brothers - Peter Jr., Bernhard, Ruedi and Kurt - are curlers too, they won Swiss and European championships and Worlds medals when they played in Peter Jr.'s team. His nephew (Peter Jr.'s son) Felix is skip of team, he won Swiss men's silver in 2017 and bronze in 2016; Peter Jr. coached his team. Bernhard's daughter Sandra Ramstein-Attinger is a competitive curler too, she played on three Women's Worlds with teams skipped by Silvana Tirinzoni and Binia Feltscher-Beeli.
