= Jean-Francois Orset =

French curler

- Curler ♂

Team
- Curling club: Mont d'Arbois CC, Megève, Club de sports Megève, Megève

Curling career
- Member Association: France
- World Championship: 1 (1987)
- European Championship: 3 (1978, 1981, 1986)
Medal record
Curling
French Men's Championship
Gold medal – first place	1986

Jean-Francois Orset (born c. 1949) is a French curler.

At the national level, he is a one-time French men's champion curler.

As of the 1987 World Championships, he was employed as a florist.

== Teams ==
Season	Skip	Third	Second	Lead	Events
1977–78	André Tronc	Jean-Louis Sibuet	Gaby Ronchis	Jean-Francois Orset	ECC 1977 (6th)
1981–82	André Tronc	Maurice Mercier	Yves Tronc	Jean-Francois Orset	ECC 1981 (5th)
1986–87	Jean-Francois Orset	Claude Feige	Jean-Louis Sibuet	Marc Sibuet	ECC 1986 (8th); WCC 1987 (9th)
