= Felix Luchsinger =

Swiss curler

- Curler ♂

Team
- Curling club: CC Dübendorf, Dübendorf

Curling career
- Member Association: Switzerland
- World Championship: 1 (1987)
- European Championship: 3 (1986, 1996, 1998)
Medal record
Curling
European Championships
Gold medal – first place	1986 Copenhagen
Bronze medal – third place	1996 Copenhagen
Swiss Men's Championship
Gold medal – first place	1987
Silver medal – second place	1998
Bronze medal – third place	1996

Felix Luchsinger (born c. 1959) is a former Swiss curler. He skipped the Swiss rink that won the 1986 European Curling Championship.

At the time of the 1987 World Championship, he was employed as a life insurance salesman.

== Teams ==
Season	Skip	Third	Second	Lead	Alternate	Coach	Events
1977–78	Felix Luchsinger	Thomas Grendelmeier	Danny Streiff	Ueli Bernauer			SJCC 1978 (gold); WJCC 1978 (7th)
1986–87	Felix Luchsinger	Thomas Grendelmeier	Daniel Streiff	Fritz Luchsinger			ECC 1986 (gold); SMCC 1987 (gold); WCC 1987 (7th)
1995–96	Felix Luchsinger	Werner Attinger	Markus Foitek	Markus Luchsinger			SMCC 1996 (bronze)
1996–97	Felix Luchsinger	Werner Attinger	Markus Foitek	Markus Luchsinger	Thomas Grendelmeier	Frédéric Jean	ECC 1996 (bronze)
1997–98	Felix Luchsinger	Werner Attinger	Andreas Schwaller	Thomas Grendelmeier			SMCC 1998 (silver)
1998–99	Felix Luchsinger	Werner Attinger	Thomas Grendelmeier	Markus Luchsinger	Markus Foitek	Frédéric Jean	ECC 1998 (5th)
