= 2003 World Senior Curling Championships =

Championship event

- Host city: Winnipeg, Canada
- Arena: Heather CC (men's), St. Vital CC (women's)
- Dates: April 2–6
- Men's winner: Canada
- Skip: Tom Reed
- Third: Warren Kushnir
- Second: Larry Gardeski
- Lead: Garry Landry
- Alternate: Fred McKenzie
- Finalist: United States (Scott Baird)
- Women's winner: Canada
- Skip: Nancy Kerr
- Third: Linda Burnham
- Second: Kenda Richards
- Lead: Gertie Pick
- Finalist: Scotland (Carolyn Morris)

The 2003 World Senior Curling Championships were held from April 2 to 6 at the Heather Curling Club and St. Vital Curling Club in Winnipeg, Canada.

The tournament was held partly in conjunction with 2003 World Men's Curling Championship and 2003 World Women's Curling Championship.

== Men ==
=== Teams ===
Country	Skip	Third	Second	Lead	Alternate	Coach	Curling club
Australia	Lloyd Roberts	Neil Galbraith	Jim Oastler	Richard Leggat			
Canada	Tom Reed	Warren Kushnir	Larry Gardeski	Garry Landry	Fred McKenzie		
Denmark	John Hansen	Arne Andersen	Flemming Duus	Kjeld Jørgensen			
England	D. Michael Sutherland	Eric Laidler	John MacDougall	Ronald Thwaites	Alistair Davison		
Finland	Lauri Perkiö	Mauno Nummila	Yrjö Franssila	Antti Sundholm	Olli Kallio	Seppo Stark	M-curling Vantaa
Germany	Charlie Kapp	Karl-Dieter Schäfer	Anton Grief	Rudi Ibald	Klaus Unterstab		
Italy	Dino Zardini	Enrico Alberti	Valerio Constantini	Gianantonio Gillarduzzi			
Japan	Akinori Kashiwagi	Teruo Moriizumi	Hideaki Nagaoka	Kazuyuki Tsuchiya	Akira Tsuchiya	Michiaki Saito	
New Zealand	Peter Becker	Allan McLean	Mervyn Jamieson	Edwin Harley			
Norway	Tormod Andreassen	Sverre Sandbakken	Jan Kolstad	Olaf Carlem	Helmer Strømbo		
Scotland	Iain Baxter	James Muir	Sandy Brown	Harry Ferguson		Andrew Hepburn	
Sweden	Göran Roxin	Claes Roxin	Björn Roxin	Lars-Eric Roxin		Michael Roxin	Linköpings CK
Switzerland	Karl Grossman	Kurt Berner	Urs Schmid	Heinz Meierhofer	Hans-Ulrich Schick		
United States	Scott Baird	Mark Haluptzok	Bob Fenson	Bob Naylor	Richard Reierson		
Wales	Hugh Meikle	Peter Harris	Ray King	Chris Wells			

=== Round robin ===
==== Group A ====
Place	Team	1	2	3	4	5	6	7	8	Wins	Losses
1	Canada	*	8:3	11:2	8:2	11:8	12:4	10:2	12:1	7	0
2	Switzerland	3:8	*	5:3	7:3	5:6	9:5	9:8	8:2	5	2
3	Germany	2:11	3:5	*	9:3	7:1	6:4	13:2	9:2	5	2
4	England	2:8	3:7	3:9	*	10:6	8:7	10:6	10:4	4	3
5	Japan	8:11	6:5	1:7	6:10	*	14:4	5:4	10:1	4	3
6	Finland	4:12	5:9	4:6	7:8	4:14	*	8:3	8:4	2	5
7	Denmark	2:10	8:9	2:13	6:10	4:5	3:8	*	8:7	1	6
8	New Zealand	1:12	2:8	2:9	4:10	1:10	4:8	7:8	*	0	7

==== Group B ====
Place	Team	1	2	3	4	5	6	7	Wins	Losses
1	United States	*	7:6	9:3	6:3	11:3	7:3	15:2	6	0
2	Scotland	6:7	*	10:2	8:2	13:2	8:5	17:1	5	1
3	Norway	3:9	2:10	*	8:7	7:6	8:6	12:0	4	2
4	Sweden	3:6	2:8	7:8	*	9:2	9:4	7:6	3	3
5	Italy	3:11	2:13	6:7	2:9	*	8:6	14:4	2	4
6	Wales	3:7	5:8	6:8	4:9	6:8	*	10:2	1	5
7	Australia	2:15	1:17	0:12	6:7	4:14	2:10	*	0	6

Teams to playoffs
Teams to tiebreaker

==== Tiebreaker ====
April 5, 14:00

Sheet B	1	2	3	4	5	6	7	8	Final
Switzerland	0	1	0	1	1	0	2	X	5
Germany 🔨	1	0	2	0	0	4	0	X	7

=== Playoffs ===
Semi-final
A-1	Canada	5
B-2	Scotland	3
B-1	United States	8
A-2	Germany	5

Final
Canada	9
United States	3
Bronze medal game
Scotland	7
Germany	5

Semi-finals
April 6, 9:30

Sheet C	1	2	3	4	5	6	7	8	Final
Scotland 🔨	1	1	0	0	1	0	0	X	3
Canada	0	0	0	2	0	2	1	X	5

Sheet E	1	2	3	4	5	6	7	8	Final
Germany 🔨	2	1	0	1	0	1	0	0	5
United States	0	0	3	0	2	0	1	2	8

Bronze medal game
April 6, 14:00

Sheet D	1	2	3	4	5	6	7	8	Final
Scotland	0	1	2	0	2	0	1	1	7
Germany 🔨	0	0	0	1	0	4	0	0	5

Final
April 6, 14:00

Sheet B	1	2	3	4	5	6	7	8	Final
Canada 🔨	3	0	2	2	2	0	X	X	9
United States	0	1	0	0	0	2	X	X	3

=== Final standings ===
Place	Team	Games played	Wins	Losses
1st place, gold medalist(s)	Canada	9	9	0
2nd place, silver medalist(s)	United States	8	7	1
3rd place, bronze medalist(s)	Scotland	8	6	2
4	Germany	10	6	4
5	Switzerland	8	5	3
5	Norway	6	4	2
7	England	7	4	3
7	Sweden	6	3	3
9	Japan	7	4	3
9	Italy	6	2	4
11	Finland	7	2	5
11	Wales	6	1	5
13	Denmark	7	1	6
13	Australia	6	0	6
15	New Zealand	7	0	7

== Women ==
=== Teams ===
Country	Skip	Third	Second	Lead	Alternate	Coach	Curling club
Canada	Nancy Kerr	Linda Burnham	Kenda Richards	Gertie Pick			
Denmark	Jytte Berg	Bente Mortensen	Lone Tordrup	Marie Louise Birch		Torkil Svensgaard	Odense CC
England	Joan Reed	Glynnice Lauder	Venetia Scott	Moira Davison			Glendale CC, Northumberland
Italy	Ann Urquhart	Maria-Grazzia Lacedelli	Tea Savoia	Franca Faccin			
Japan	Ayako Takagi	Reiko Nihommatsu	Toshiko Meguro	Noriko Kaneuchi	Hiroko Oishi	Maya Meguro	
Netherlands	Beatrice Miltenburg	Marijke Paulissen-Walschots	Sylvia Van Der Pluijm	Hannie Gast		John Paulissen	
New Zealand	Liz Matthews	Chris Fromow	Christine Bewick	Nola Dangen			Auckland CC
Scotland	Carolyn Morris	Pat Lockhart	Trudie Milne	Linda Lesperance			
Switzerland	Antoinette Geser	Rita Reiser	Jacqueline Escoffier	Lola Chauffat	Else Tremblet		
United States	LaVonne Berg	Delores McDonald	Paddy Hutson	Nancy Rentfrow	Jean Vorachek	George Phillips	

=== Round robin ===
Place	Team	1	2	3	4	5	6	7	8	9	10	Wins	Losses
1	Canada	*	6:5	6:3	6:2	7:3	6:4	10:3	7:4	10:2	10:2	9	0
2	Scotland	5:6	*	7:5	9:5	9:8	6:3	14:3	11:5	11:0	10:1	8	1
3	England	3:6	5:7	*	5:2	2:7	8:4	9:6	8:2	9:2	12:1	6	3
4	Japan	2:6	5:9	2:5	*	7:5	8:1	8:6	9:5	5:6	10:0	5	4
5	United States	3:7	8:9	7:2	5:7	*	5:6	7:2	11:7	12:1	13:2	5	4
6	Italy	4:6	3:6	4:8	1:8	6:5	*	9:5	4:5	10:6	9:3	4	5
7	Switzerland	3:10	3:14	6:9	6:8	2:7	5:9	*	6:5	8:4	11:1	3	6
8	Netherlands	4:7	5:11	2:8	5:9	7:11	5:4	5:6	*	9:5	13:2	3	6
9	Denmark	2:10	0:11	2:9	6:5	1:12	6:10	4:8	5:9	*	12:1	2	7
10	New Zealand	2:10	1:10	1:12	0:10	2:13	3:9	1:11	2:13	1:12	*	0	9

Teams to playoffs
Teams to tiebreaker

==== Tiebreaker ====
April 5, 14:00

Sheet A	1	2	3	4	5	6	7	8	Final
Japan	0	0	4	0	0	2	2	1	9
United States 🔨	1	3	0	1	2	0	0	0	7

=== Playoffs ===
Semi-final
1	Canada	10
4	Japan	5
2	Scotland	4
3	England	3

Final
Canada	7
Scotland	4
Bronze medal game
Japan	1
England	8

Semi-finals
April 6, 10:30

Sheet B	1	2	3	4	5	6	7	8	Final
Japan	0	0	2	3	0	0	0	X	5
Canada 🔨	1	2	0	0	2	4	1	X	10

Sheet D	1	2	3	4	5	6	7	8	Final
Scotland	1	1	0	0	0	1	0	1	4
England 🔨	0	0	1	1	0	0	1	0	3

Bronze medal game
April 6, 16:00

Sheet A	1	2	3	4	5	6	7	8	Final
England	0	0	2	1	3	1	1	X	8
Japan 🔨	1	0	0	0	0	0	0	X	1

Final
April 6, 16:00

Sheet C	1	2	3	4	5	6	7	8	Final
Canada 🔨	0	0	5	0	0	2	0	X	7
Scotland	0	1	0	1	1	0	1	X	4

=== Final standings ===
Place	Team	Games played	Wins	Losses
1st place, gold medalist(s)	Canada	11	11	0
2nd place, silver medalist(s)	Scotland	11	9	2
3rd place, bronze medalist(s)	England	11	7	4
4	Japan	12	6	6
5	United States	10	5	5
6	Italy	9	4	5
7	Switzerland	9	3	6
8	Netherlands	9	3	6
9	Denmark	9	2	7
10	New Zealand	9	0	9
