= Bernhard Attinger =

Swiss male curler (born 1953)

- Curler ♂
- Born: 22 July 1953 (age 73)

Team
- Curling club: CC Dübendorf, Dübendorf

Curling career
- Member Association: Switzerland
- World Championship: 4 (1972, 1974, 1979, 1984)
- European Championship: 3 (1976, 1984, 1988)
- Other appearances: World Senior Championships: 3 (2005, 2006, 2013)
Medal record
Curling
World Championships
Silver medal – second place	1979 Bern
Silver medal – second place	1984 Duluth
Bronze medal – third place	1984 Bern
European Championships
Gold medal – first place	1976 West Berlin
Gold medal – first place	1984 Morzine
Bronze medal – third place	1988 Pert
Swiss Men's Championship
Gold medal – first place	1972
Gold medal – first place	1974
Gold medal – first place	1979
Gold medal – first place	1984
Silver medal – second place	1978
Silver medal – second place	1980
Silver medal – second place	1981
Silver medal – second place	1992
Bronze medal – third place	1982
Bronze medal – third place	1983
Bronze medal – third place	1989
Bronze medal – third place	1990

Bernhard Attinger (born 22 July 1953) is a former Swiss curler. He played third position on the Swiss rink that won two European Curling Championships (1976, 1984) and medals at the World Men's Championships in 1979 and 1984 (silver) and 1974 (bronze).

He works as a vice-president of Curling Club Dübendorf and as a vice-president of Dübendorf-based company "Rossweid Immobilien AG".

== Teams ==
Season	Skip	Third	Second	Lead	Alternate	Coach	Events
1971–72	Bernhard Attinger	Peter Attinger Jr.	Mattias Neuenschwander	Jürg Geiler			SJCC 1972 (gold)
1971–72	Ernst Bosshard (fourth)	Peter Attinger Sr. (skip)	Bernhard Attinger	Peter Attinger Jr.			SMCC 1972 (gold); WCC 1972 (5th)
1972–73	Peter Attinger Jr.	Bernhard Attinger	Mattias Neuenschwander	Jürg Geiler			SJCC 1973 (gold)
1973–74	Bernhard Attinger	Kurt Attinger	Ruedi Attinger	Louis Keller			SJCC 1974 (gold); WJCC 1974 (gold) (unofficial)
1973–74	Peter Attinger Jr.	Bernhard Attinger	Mattias Neuenschwander	Jürg Geiler			SMCC 1974 (gold); WCC 1974 (bronze)
1976–77	Peter Attinger Jr.	Bernhard Attinger	Mattias Neuenschwander	Ruedi Attinger			ECC 1976 (gold)
1977–78	Peter Attinger Jr.	Bernhard Attinger	Mattias Neuenschwander	Ruedi Attinger			SMCC 1978 (silver)
1978–79	Peter Attinger Jr.	Bernhard Attinger	Mattias Neuenschwander	Ruedi Attinger			SMCC 1979 (gold); WCC 1979 (silver)
1979–80	Peter Attinger Jr.	Bernhard Attinger	Mattias Neuenschwander	Kurt Attinger			SMCC 1980 (silver)
1980–81	Peter Attinger Jr.	Bernhard Attinger	Mattias Neuenschwander	Ruedi Attinger			SMCC 1981 (silver)
1981–82	Peter Attinger Jr.	Bernhard Attinger	Ruedi Attinger	Kurt Attinger			SMCC 1982 (bronze)
1982–83	Peter Attinger Jr.	Bernhard Attinger	Ruedi Attinger	Kurt Attinger			SMCC 1983 (bronze)
1983–84	Peter Attinger Jr.	Bernhard Attinger	Werner Attinger	Kurt Attinger			SMCC 1984 (gold); WCC 1984 (silver)
1984–85	Peter Attinger Jr.	Bernhard Attinger	Werner Attinger	Kurt Attinger			ECC 1984 (gold)
1988–89	Bernhard Attinger	Werner Attinger	Martin Zürrer	Marcel Senn			ECC 1988 (bronze); SMCC 1989 (bronze)
1989–90	Bernhard Attinger	Werner Attinger	Martin Zürrer	Marcel Senn			SMCC 1990 (bronze)
1991–92	Bernhard Attinger	Peter Attinger Jr.	Werner Attinger	Thomas Grendelmeier			SMCC 1992 (silver)
2004–05	Peter Attinger Jr.	Bernhard Attinger	Mattias Neuenschwander	Jürg Geiler	Simon Roth		WSCC 2005 (bronze)
2005–06	Mattias Neuenschwander	Bernhard Attinger	Peter Attinger Jr.	Anton Knobel			SSCC 2006 (gold)
2005–06	Peter Attinger Jr.	Mattias Neuenschwander	Bernhard Attinger	Tony Knobel	Fritz Widmer	Fritz Widmer	WSCC 2006 (5th)
2006–07	Peter Attinger Jr.	Bernhard Attinger	Christian Roth	Anton Knobel			SSCC 2007 (bronze)
2012–13	Werner Attinger	Peter Attinger Jr.	Ronny Müller	Tony Knobel	Bernhard Attinger		WSCC 2013 (bronze)
2017–18	Bernhard Attinger	Jürg Wagenseil	Werner Büchler	Peter Jauch			SSCC 2018 (15th)

== Private life ==
Bernhard Attinger grew up in a family of curlers. His father Peter Attinger Sr. is a 1972 Swiss men's champion (he was skip of a team where Bernhard played and won his first national men's gold in 1972). His brothers - Peter Jr., Werner, Ruedi and Kurt - are curlers too, they won Swiss and European championships and Worlds medals when they played in Peter Jr.'s team. His nephew (Peter Jr.'s son) Felix is skip of team, he won Swiss men's silver in 2017 and bronze in 2016; Peter Jr. coached his team. Bernhard's daughter Sandra Ramstein-Attinger is a competitive curler too, she played on three Women's Worlds with teams skipped by Silvana Tirinzoni and Binia Feltscher-Beeli.
