= 1984 Air Canada Silver Broom =

- Host city: Duluth, Minnesota, United States
- Arena: Duluth Arena Auditorium
- Dates: April 2–8, 1984
- Winner: Norway
- Curling club: Snarøen CC, Oslo
- Skip: Eigil Ramsfjell
- Third: Sjur Loen
- Second: Gunnar Meland
- Lead: Bo Bakke
- Finalist: Switzerland (Peter Attinger Jr.)

The 1984 Air Canada Silver Broom, the men's world curling championship, was held from April 2–8 at the Memorial Auditorium in Duluth, Minnesota, United States.

== Teams ==
Austria	Canada	Denmark	Germany	Italy
Kitzbühl CC Skip: Günther Märker; Third: Ronald Koudelka; Second: Günther Mochny; Lead: Ernst Egger; Alternate: Günther Hummelt	Pembina CC, Winnipeg, Manitoba Skip: Mike Riley; Third: Brian Toews; Second: John Helston; Lead: Russ Wookey	Gentofte CC, Copenhagen Skip: Christian Thune; Third: Niels Siggaard; Second: Jens Møller; Lead: Torsten Søndergaard	CC Schwennigen Skip: Keith Wendorf; Third: Hans Dieter Kiesel; Second: Sven Saile; Lead: Heiner Martin	Tofane CC, Cortina d'Ampezzo Skip: Andrea Pavani; Third: Franco Sovilla; Second: Giancarlo Valt; Lead: Stefano Morona
Norway	Scotland	Sweden	Switzerland	United States
Snarøen CC, Oslo Skip: Eigil Ramsfjell; Third: Sjur Loen; Second: Gunnar Meland; Lead: Bo Bakke	Dunning CC Skip: Mike Hay; Third: David Hay; Second: David Smith; Lead: Russell Keiller; Alternate: Gordon Sneddon	Karlstads CK Fourth: Connie Östlund; Skip: Per Lindeman; Second: Carl von Wendt; Lead: Bo Andersson	Dübendorf CC Skip: Peter Attinger Jr. Third: Bernhard Attinger; Second: Werner Attinger; Lead: Kurt Attinger	Hibbing CC, Hibbing, Minnesota Fourth: Joe Roberts; Skip: Bruce Roberts; Second: Gary Kleffman; Lead: Jerry Scott

== Round-robin standings ==
Key
Teams to playoffs
Teams to tiebreaker

Country	Skip	W	L
Sweden	Connie Östlund	7	2
Switzerland	Peter Attinger Jr.	7	2
Canada	Mike Riley	6	3
Germany	Keith Wendorf	6	3
Norway	Eigil Ramsfjell	6	3
United States	Bruce Roberts	5	4
Scotland	Mike Hay	5	4
Italy	Andrea Pavani	2	7
Denmark	Christian Thune	1	8
Austria	Günther Märker	0	9

== Round-robin results ==
=== Draw 1 ===
Team	Final
Canada (Riley)	9
Germany (Wendorf)	5

Team	Final
Norway (Ramsfjell)	4
Sweden (Östlund)	7

Team	Final
Scotland (Hay)	3
United States (Roberts)	11

Team	Final
Denmark (Thune)	2
Switzerland (P. Attinger)	16

Team	Final
Austria (Märker)	6
Italy (Pavani)	9

=== Draw 2 ===
Team	Final
Austria (Märker)	5
Norway (Ramsfjell)	12

Team	Final
United States (Roberts)	6
Italy (Pavani)	3

Team	Final
Canada (Riley)	7
Denmark (Thune)	3

Team	Final
Scotland (Hay)	6
Germany (Wendorf)	4

Team	Final
Sweden (Östlund)	8
Switzerland (P. Attinger)	2

=== Draw 3 ===
Team	Final
Switzerland (P. Attinger)	11
Italy (Pavani)	5

Team	Final
Germany (Wendorf)	8
Denmark (Thune)	3

Team	Final
Sweden (Östlund)	6
Austria (Märker)	0

Team	Final
United States (Roberts)	6
Canada (Riley)	2

Team	Final
Scotland (Hay)	5
Norway (Ramsfjell)	8

=== Draw 4 ===
Team	Final
Germany (Wendorf)	8
Sweden (Östlund)	5

Team	Final
Scotland (Hay)	4
Canada (Riley)	9

Team	Final
Norway (Ramsfjell)	8
Italy (Pavani)	4

Team	Final
Switzerland (P. Attinger)	7
Austria (Märker)	4

Team	Final
Denmark (Thune)	3
United States (Roberts)	6

=== Draw 5 ===
Team	Final
Scotland (Hay)	5
Austria (Märker)	1

Team	Final
Sweden (Östlund)	6
United States (Roberts)	4

Team	Final
Germany (Wendorf)	5
Switzerland (P. Attinger)	7

Team	Final
Norway (Ramsfjell)	7
Denmark (Thune)	1

Team	Final
Italy (Pavani)	2
Canada (Riley)	6

=== Draw 6 ===
Team	Final
Italy (Pavani)	7
Denmark (Thune)	5

Team	Final
Canada (Riley)	4
Switzerland (P. Attinger)	6

Team	Final
United States (Roberts)	5
Norway (Ramsfjell)	6

Team	Final
Sweden (Östlund)	4
Scotland (Hay)	6

Team	Final
Germany (Wendorf)	7
Austria (Märker)	2

=== Draw 7 ===
Team	Final
Norway (Ramsfjell)	5
Canada (Riley)	6

Team	Final
Italy (Pavani)	1
Germany (Wendorf)	6

Team	Final
Denmark (Thune)	4
Sweden (Östlund)	7

Team	Final
Austria (Märker)	5
United States (Roberts)	11

Team	Final
Switzerland (P. Attinger)	5
Scotland (Hay)	3

=== Draw 8 ===
Team	Final
United States (Roberts)	5
Switzerland (P. Attinger)	6

Team	Final
Denmark (Thune)	7
Austria (Märker)	3

Team	Final
Italy (Pavani)	2
Scotland (Hay)	3

Team	Final
Germany (Wendorf)	8
Norway (Ramsfjell)	3

Team	Final
Canada (Riley)	4
Sweden (Östlund)	5

=== Draw 9 ===
Team	Final
Denmark (Thune)	4
Scotland (Hay)	7

Team	Final
Switzerland (P. Attinger)	3
Norway (Ramsfjell)	9

Team	Final
Austria (Märker)	2
Canada (Riley)	9

Team	Final
Italy (Pavani)	3
Sweden (Östlund)	9

Team	Final
United States (Roberts)	5
Germany (Wendorf)	6

== Tiebreaker ==
Team	Final
Germany (Wendorf)	5
Norway (Ramsfjell)	6

== Playoffs ==
Semifinals
1	Sweden	3
4	Norway	5
2	Switzerland	9
3	Canada	8

Final
4	Norway	8
2	Switzerland	5

=== Semifinals ===
Team	Final
Sweden (Östlund)	3
Norway (Ramsfjell)	5

Team	Final
Canada (Riley)	8
Switzerland (P. Attinger)	9

=== Final ===
Team	1	2	3	4	5	6	7	8	9	10	Final
Norway (Ramsfjell)	2	0	1	0	2	0	2	0	1	X	8
Switzerland (P. Attinger)	0	1	0	1	0	1	0	2	0	X	5

1984 Air Canada Silver Broom
(Norway)
Norway
2nd title
