= Andrée Dupont-Roc =

French curler and coach

- Curler ♀

Team
- Curling club: Club de sports Megève, Megève, CC Mont d'Arbois, Megève

Curling career
- Member Association: France
- World Championship: 5 (1984, 1985, 1987, 1988, 1989)
- European Championship: 4 (1984, 1986, 1987, 1988)
- Olympic: 1 (1988 - demo)
- Other appearances: European Mixed Championship: 1 (2006
Medal record
Curling
French Women's Championship
Gold medal – first place	1997

Andrée Dupont-Roc is a French curler and curling coach.

She participated in the demonstration curling events at the 1988 Winter Olympics, where the French women's team finished in eighth place.

At the national level, she is a French women's champion curler (1997).

== Teams ==
=== Women's ===
Season	Skip	Third	Second	Lead	Events
1983–84	Huguette Jullien (fourth)	Agnes Mercier	Andrée Dupont-Roc	Paulette Sulpice (skip)	ЧМ 1984 (7 место)
1984–85	Huguette Jullien (fourth)	Andrée Dupont-Roc	Paulette Sulpice (skip)	Monique Tournier	ECC 1984 (6th)
1984–85	Huguette Jullien (fourth)	Paulette Sulpice (skip)	Andrée Dupont-Roc	Jocelyn Lhenry	WCC 1985 (8th)
1986–87	Andrée Dupont-Roc (fourth)	Agnes Mercier	Catherine Lefebvre	Annick Mercier (skip)	ECC 1986 (5th)
1986–87	Annick Mercier (fourth)	Agnes Mercier (skip)	Andrée Dupont-Roc	Catherine Lefebvre	WCC 1987 (8th)
1987–88	Agnes Mercier	Annick Mercier	Andrée Dupont-Roc	Catherine Lefebvre	ECC 1987 (4th)
1987–88	Annick Mercier	Agnes Mercier	Andrée Dupont-Roc	Catherine Lefebvre	WOG 1988 (demo) (8th); WCC 1988 (8th)
1988–89	Agnes Mercier	Annick Mercier	Andrée Dupont-Roc	Catherine Lefebvre	ECC 1988 (10th)
1988–89	Agnes Mercier (fourth)	Catherine Lefebvre	Annick Mercier (skip)	Andrée Dupont-Roc	WCC 1989 (6th)

=== Mixed ===
Season	Skip	Third	Second	Lead	Events
2006–07	Vianney Leudiere	Stephanie Jaccaz	Jean-Xavier Cheval	Andrée Dupont-Roc	EMxCC 2006 (17th)

== Record as a coach of national teams ==
Year	Tournament, event	National team	Place
1998	1998 European Curling Championships	France (men)	13
1998	1998 European Curling Championships	France (women)	8
