= 1987 Hexagon World Men's Curling Championship =

- Host city: Vancouver, British Columbia, Canada
- Arena: B.C. Place Stadium
- Dates: March 30 – April 5, 1987
- Winner: Canada
- Curling club: Penetang CC; Penetanguishene, Ontario
- Skip: Russ Howard
- Third: Glenn Howard
- Second: Tim Belcourt
- Lead: Kent Carstairs
- Alternate: Larry Merkley
- Finalist: Germany (Rodger Gustaf Schmidt)

The 1987 Hexagon World Men's Curling Championship was held from March 30 to April 5 at B.C. Place Stadium in Vancouver, British Columbia.

== Teams ==
Canada	Denmark	England	France	Germany
Penetang CC, Penetanguishene Skip: Russ Howard; Third: Glenn Howard; Second: Tim Belcourt; Lead: Kent Carstairs; Alternate: Larry Merkley	Hvidovre CC, Hvidovre Skip: Gert Larsen; Third: Oluf Olsen; Second: Jan Hansen; Lead: Michael Harry; Alternate: Steen Hansen	Province of London CC, London Skip: Bob Martin; Third: Ronnie Brock; Second: John Brown; Lead: Robin Gemmell; Alternate: Phil Atherton	Megève CC, Megève Skip: Jean-Francois Orset; Third: Claude Feige; Second: Jean-Louis Sibuet; Lead: Marc Sibuet; Alternate: Patrick Philippe	EV Oberstdorf, Oberstdorf Skip: Rodger Gustaf Schmidt; Third: Wolfgang Burba; Second: Johnny Jahr; Lead: Hans-Joachim Burba; Alternate: Philip Seitz
Norway	Scotland	Sweden	Switzerland	United States
Snarøen CC, Oslo Skip: Eigil Ramsfjell; Third: Sjur Loen; Second: Morten Søgaard; Lead: Bo Bakke; Alternate: Gunnar Meland	Forest Hills Trossachs CC, Aberfoyle Skip: Grant McPherson; Third: Hammy McMillan; Second: Robert Wilson; Lead: Richard Harding; Alternate: Billy Andres	CK Ena, Enköping Skip: Göran Roxin; Third: Claes Roxin; Second: Björn Roxin; Lead: Lars-Eric Roxin; Alternate: Anders Ehrling	Stäfa CC, Stäfa Skip: Felix Luchsinger; Third: Thomas Grendelmeier; Second: Daniel Streiff; Lead: Fritz Luchsinger	Granite CC, Seattle Skip: Jim Vukich; Third: Ron Sharpe; Second: George Pepelnjak; Lead: Gary Joraanstad

== Round-robin standings ==
Key
Teams to playoffs
Teams to tiebreaker

Country	Skip	W	L
Norway	Eigil Ramsfjell	8	1
Canada	Russ Howard	7	2
Denmark	Gert Larsen	6	3
Germany	Rodger Gustaf Schmidt	5	4
United States	Jim Vukich	5	4
Sweden	Göran Roxin	4	5
Switzerland	Felix Luchsinger	4	5
Scotland	Grant McPherson	3	6
France	Jean-Francois Orset	2	7
England	Bob Martin	1	8

== Round-robin results ==
=== Draw 1 ===
Monday, March 30, 12:00

Sheet A	1	2	3	4	5	6	7	8	9	10	Final
France (Orset)	1	0	0	2	2	1	0	1	0	X	7
Canada (Howard)	0	2	2	0	0	0	1	0	1	X	6

Sheet B	1	2	3	4	5	6	7	8	9	10	Final
England (Martin)	0	0	0	0	0	1	0	1	X	X	2
Denmark (Larsen)	2	0	1	1	3	0	2	0	X	X	9

Sheet C	1	2	3	4	5	6	7	8	9	10	Final
Sweden (Roxin)	2	0	1	0	1	0	1	0	2	X	7
Germany (Schmidt)	0	0	0	0	0	2	0	1	0	X	3

Sheet D	1	2	3	4	5	6	7	8	9	10	Final
United States (Vukich)	0	2	0	0	0	0	0	2	0	X	4
Scotland (McPherson)	1	0	1	0	0	0	0	0	0	X	2

Sheet E	1	2	3	4	5	6	7	8	9	10	Final
Norway (Ramsfjell)	1	1	0	0	0	1	0	1	0	1	5
Switzerland (Luchsinger)	0	0	1	0	1	0	0	0	2	0	4

=== Draw 2 ===
Monday, March 30, 18:00

Sheet A	1	2	3	4	5	6	7	8	9	10	Final
Sweden (Roxin)	1	0	1	1	0	1	0	1	0	2	7
Scotland (McPherson)	0	2	0	0	1	0	1	0	1	0	5

Sheet B	1	2	3	4	5	6	7	8	9	10	Final
Canada (Howard)	0	2	0	1	0	0	2	0	1	X	6
Norway (Ramsfjell)	1	0	1	0	0	0	0	2	0	X	4

Sheet C	1	2	3	4	5	6	7	8	9	10	11	Final
United States (Vukich)	0	2	0	1	0	0	1	0	2	0	1	7
England (Martin)	1	0	1	0	1	0	0	2	0	1	0	6

Sheet D	1	2	3	4	5	6	7	8	9	10	Final
Germany (Schmidt)	0	0	1	0	1	0	1	0	X	X	3
Switzerland (Luchsinger)	0	1	0	4	0	1	0	5	X	X	11

Sheet E	1	2	3	4	5	6	7	8	9	10	Final
France (Orset)	0	0	0	0	0	1	0	0	X	X	1
Denmark (Larsen)	0	0	2	0	1	0	3	1	X	X	7

=== Draw 3 ===
Tuesday, March 31, 12:00

Sheet A	1	2	3	4	5	6	7	8	9	10	Final
Denmark (Larsen)	0	1	0	1	1	0	0	2	0	X	6
Germany (Schmidt)	1	0	1	0	0	0	2	0	1	X	5

Sheet B	1	2	3	4	5	6	7	8	9	10	Final
Sweden (Roxin)	1	0	0	0	0	3	0	1	1	1	7
Switzerland (Luchsinger)	0	2	1	0	1	0	1	0	0	0	5

Sheet C	1	2	3	4	5	6	7	8	9	10	Final
England (Martin)	0	0	1	1	0	1	0	X	X	X	3
Canada (Howard)	3	2	0	0	3	0	3	X	X	X	11

Sheet D	1	2	3	4	5	6	7	8	9	10	Final
Norway (Ramsfjell)	0	0	2	1	0	0	1	0	1	X	5
United States (Vukich)	1	0	0	0	1	0	0	0	0	X	2

Sheet E	1	2	3	4	5	6	7	8	9	10	Final
Scotland (McPherson)	1	1	0	1	0	0	0	1	0	3	7
France (Orset)	0	0	1	0	1	0	0	0	1	0	3

=== Draw 4 ===
Tuesday, March 31, 18:00

Sheet A	1	2	3	4	5	6	7	8	9	10	Final
England (Martin)	0	1	0	0	0	1	X	X	X	X	2
Switzerland (Luchsinger)	2	0	2	4	4	0	X	X	X	X	12

Sheet B	1	2	3	4	5	6	7	8	9	10	Final
Germany (Schmidt)	0	1	1	0	0	0	3	1	1	X	7
France (Orset)	0	0	0	0	1	1	0	0	0	X	2

Sheet C	1	2	3	4	5	6	7	8	9	10	Final
Denmark (Larsen)	0	1	1	0	0	1	1	0	1	0	5
United States (Vukich)	1	0	0	1	0	0	0	2	0	2	6

Sheet D	1	2	3	4	5	6	7	8	9	10	Final
Scotland (McPherson)	0	0	0	1	0	0	0	0	1	X	2
Canada (Howard)	0	2	1	0	0	0	0	3	0	X	6

Sheet E	1	2	3	4	5	6	7	8	9	10	Final
Sweden (Roxin)	1	0	0	1	0	0	1	0	3	0	6
Norway (Ramsfjell)	0	2	1	0	0	1	0	1	0	2	7

=== Draw 5 ===
Wednesday, April 1, 12:00

Sheet A	1	2	3	4	5	6	7	8	9	10	Final
Scotland (McPherson)	0	1	0	0	0	1	0	X	X	X	2
Norway (Ramsfjell)	0	0	0	2	2	0	3	X	X	X	7

Sheet B	1	2	3	4	5	6	7	8	9	10	Final
United States (Vukich)	0	1	0	0	3	0	2	0	0	X	6
Sweden (Roxin)	1	0	1	0	0	1	0	0	0	X	3

Sheet C	1	2	3	4	5	6	7	8	9	10	Final
Canada (Howard)	0	1	0	0	2	1	0	0	5	X	9
Denmark (Larsen)	1	0	0	1	0	0	1	1	0	X	4

Sheet D	1	2	3	4	5	6	7	8	9	10	Final
Switzerland (Luchsinger)	0	1	0	0	2	0	4	3	X	X	10
France (Orset)	0	0	1	2	0	1	0	0	X	X	4

Sheet E	1	2	3	4	5	6	7	8	9	10	Final
Germany (Schmidt)	0	2	0	2	0	2	0	2	0	X	8
England (Martin)	1	0	1	0	1	0	2	0	1	X	6

=== Draw 6 ===
Wednesday, April 1, 18:00

Sheet A	1	2	3	4	5	6	7	8	9	10	11	Final
Switzerland (Luchsinger)	0	0	0	1	0	0	2	0	1	0	0	4
Denmark (Larsen)	1	0	0	0	1	1	0	1	0	0	4	8

Sheet B	1	2	3	4	5	6	7	8	9	10	Final
Scotland (McPherson)	0	0	0	1	0	1	0	0	0	X	2
Germany (Schmidt)	1	0	1	0	2	0	0	2	1	X	7

Sheet C	1	2	3	4	5	6	7	8	9	10	Final
Norway (Ramsfjell)	3	1	1	3	1	2	X	X	X	X	11
France (Orset)	0	0	0	0	0	0	X	X	X	X	0

Sheet D	1	2	3	4	5	6	7	8	9	10	Final
England (Martin)	0	1	0	0	2	0	1	0	3	X	7
Sweden (Roxin)	0	0	1	0	0	0	0	2	0	X	3

Sheet E	1	2	3	4	5	6	7	8	9	10	Final
United States (Vukich)	0	0	1	0	1	0	0	1	X	X	3
Canada (Howard)	2	0	0	1	0	3	1	0	X	X	7

=== Draw 7 ===
Thursday, April 2, 12:00

Sheet A	1	2	3	4	5	6	7	8	9	10	Final
United States (Vukich)	0	1	0	2	0	0	0	0	1	X	4
France (Orset)	0	0	1	0	0	1	0	0	0	X	2

Sheet B	1	2	3	4	5	6	7	8	9	10	Final
Norway (Ramsfjell)	0	3	1	0	1	6	X	X	X	X	11
England (Martin)	1	0	0	1	0	0	X	X	X	X	2

Sheet C	1	2	3	4	5	6	7	8	9	10	Final
Scotland (McPherson)	2	0	0	0	3	1	0	2	X	X	8
Switzerland (Luchsinger)	0	0	0	1	0	0	2	0	X	X	3

Sheet D	Final
Canada (Howard)	L
Germany (Schmidt)	W

Sheet E	1	2	3	4	5	6	7	8	9	10	Final
Denmark (Larsen)	0	0	2	0	1	3	0	1	0	0	7
Sweden (Roxin)	3	0	0	1	0	0	1	0	1	0	6

=== Draw 8 ===
Thursday, April 2, 18:00

Sheet A	1	2	3	4	5	6	7	8	9	10	Final
Canada (Howard)	1	0	0	0	2	0	3	0	0	5	11
Sweden (Roxin)	0	1	1	1	0	2	0	1	0	0	7

Sheet B	1	2	3	4	5	6	7	8	9	10	Final
Denmark (Larsen)	1	1	1	1	1	0	1	0	0	X	6
Scotland (McPherson)	0	0	0	0	0	1	0	2	0	X	3

Sheet C	1	2	3	4	5	6	7	8	9	10	Final
Germany (Schmidt)	0	0	1	0	0	1	0	X	X	X	2
Norway (Ramsfjell)	2	0	0	2	4	0	2	X	X	X	10

Sheet D	Final
France (Orset)	W
England (Martin)	L

Sheet E	1	2	3	4	5	6	7	8	9	10	Final
Switzerland (Luchsinger)	1	0	0	0	0	0	0	1	0	1	3
United States (Vukich)	0	2	0	0	0	0	0	0	0	0	2

=== Draw 9 ===
Friday, April 2, 9:30

Sheet A	1	2	3	4	5	6	7	8	9	10	11	Final
Germany (Schmidt)	2	0	1	0	0	2	0	2	0	0	1	8
United States (Vukich)	0	1	0	2	1	0	2	0	0	1	0	7

Sheet B	1	2	3	4	5	6	7	8	9	10	Final
Switzerland (Luchsinger)	0	0	1	0	1	0	1	1	0	X	4
Canada (Howard)	0	1	0	1	0	2	0	0	3	X	7

Sheet C	1	2	3	4	5	6	7	8	9	10	Final
France (Orset)	0	0	1	0	0	1	0	1	0	X	3
Sweden (Roxin)	0	0	0	3	0	0	1	0	2	X	6

Sheet D	1	2	3	4	5	6	7	8	9	10	Final
Denmark (Larsen)	0	0	0	1	0	1	1	0	1	0	4
Norway (Ramsfjell)	1	1	1	0	1	0	0	1	0	1	6

Sheet E	1	2	3	4	5	6	7	8	9	10	Final
England (Martin)	0	0	0	0	2	0	0	1	0	X	3
Scotland (McPherson)	1	0	1	0	0	1	1	0	3	X	7

== Tiebreaker ==
Team	1	2	3	4	5	6	7	8	9	10	Final
Germany (Schmidt)	2	0	2	0	0	1	0	0	0	2	7
United States (Vukich)	0	2	0	1	0	0	2	0	0	0	5

== Playoffs ==
Semifinals
1	Norway	5
4	Germany	6
2	Canada	4
3	Denmark	3

Gold medal game
4	Germany	5
2	Canada	9
Bronze medal game
1	Norway	11
3	Denmark	6

=== Semifinals ===
Saturday, April 4, 12:00

Team	1	2	3	4	5	6	7	8	9	10	Final
Norway (Ramsfjell)	0	1	0	2	0	1	0	0	1	0	5
Germany (Schmidt)	1	0	1	0	1	0	1	0	0	2	6

Team	1	2	3	4	5	6	7	8	9	10	Final
Canada (Howard)	0	1	0	1	0	0	2	0	0	X	4
Denmark (Larsen)	0	0	1	0	0	1	0	1	0	X	3

=== Bronze medal game ===
Saturday, April 4, 19:30

Team	Final
Norway (Ramsfjell)	11
Denmark (Larsen)	6

=== Final ===
Sunday, April 5, 11:00

Sheet C	1	2	3	4	5	6	7	8	9	10	Final
Germany (Schmidt)	2	0	1	0	1	0	0	0	1	0	5
Canada (Howard)	0	1	0	2	0	0	1	0	0	5	9

1987 Hexagon World Men's Curling Championship
(Canada)
Canada
18th title
