= Fritz Luchsinger (curler) =

Swiss curler

- Curler ♂

Team
- Curling club: CC Dübendorf, Dübendorf, Ronco s A., Stäfa CC (Stäfa)

Curling career
- Member Association: Switzerland
- World Championship: 1 (1987)
- European Championship: 1 (1986)
Medal record
Curling
European Championships
Gold medal – first place	1986 Copenhagen
Swiss Men's Championship
Gold medal – first place	1987

Fritz Luchsinger (born c. 1951) is a former Swiss curler. He played lead position on the Swiss rink that won the 1986 European Curling Championship.

He is the Honorary President of CC Stäfa. At the time of the 1987 World Championship, he was employed as a life insurance salesman and was married.

== Teams ==
Season	Skip	Third	Second	Lead	Events
1986–87	Felix Luchsinger	Thomas Grendelmeier	Daniel Streiff	Fritz Luchsinger	ECC 1986 (gold); SMCC 1987 (gold); WCC 1987 (7th)
