= 1984 European Curling Championships =

Curling Championships

- Host city: Morzine, France
- Arena: Palais des Sports
- Dates: 9–14 December
- Men's winner: Switzerland
- Curling club: Dübendorf CC, Dübendorf
- Skip: Peter Attinger Jr.
- Third: Bernhard Attinger
- Second: Werner Attinger
- Lead: Kurt Attinger
- Finalist: Scotland (Peter Wilson)
- Women's winner: Germany
- Skip: Almut Hege
- Third: Josefine Einsle
- Second: Suzanne Koch
- Lead: Petra Tschetsch
- Finalist: Sweden (Anette Norberg)

The 1984 European Curling Championships were held from 9 to 14 December at the Palais des Sports arena in Morzine, France.

The Swiss men's team skipped by Peter Attinger Jr. won their fifth European title, and the German women's team skipped by Almut Hege won their first European title.

== Men's ==
=== Teams ===
Team	Skip	Third	Second	Lead	Alternate	Curling club
Austria	Pepi Gasteiger	Günther Mochny	Werner Jesacher	Thomas Novack		
Denmark	Frants Gufler	Hans Gufler	Michael Sindt	Steen Hansen		
England	Bob Martin	Ronnie Brock	Ian Coutts	John Brown		
Finland	Kari Ryokas (fourth)	Tapio Juntunen (skip)	Harri Lehtonen	Klaus Jussila	Seppo Tomminen	Hyvinkää CC, Hyvinkää
France	Maurice Mercier	Thierry Mercier	Jacques Joulien	Emile Pomi		
Germany	Keith Wendorf	Uwe Saile	Sven Saile	Andreas Sailer		CC Schwenningen, Schwenningen
Italy	Andrea Pavani	Franco Sovilla	Giancarlo Valt	Stefano Morona		
Luxembourg	Guy Schweich	William Bannerman	Nico Schweich	Denis Boulianne	Paul Bannerman	
Netherlands	Wim Neeleman	Robert van der Cammen	Gérard Verbeek	Jeroen Tilman		
Norway	Kristian Sørum	Morten Søgaard	Dagfinn Loen	Morten Skaug		
Scotland	Peter Wilson	Norman Brown	Hugh Aitken	Roger McIntyre		
Sweden	Per Carlsén	Jan Strandlund	Tommy Olin	Olle Håkansson		Sundsvalls CK, Sundsvall
Switzerland	Peter Attinger Jr.	Bernhard Attinger	Werner Attinger	Kurt Attinger		Dübendorf CC, Dübendorf
Wales	John Hunt	John Stone	Scott Lyon	Ray King		

=== Round robin ===
Group A

	Team	A1	A2	A3	A4	A5	A6	A7	W	L	Place
A1	Austria	*	9:5	3:5	5:7	2:16	5:7	4:9	1	5	7
A2	England	5:9	*	9:8	5:10	6:5	6:5	10:9	4	2	3
A3	France	5:3	8:9	*	2:9	1:6	5:6	4:14	1	5	6
A4	Germany	7:5	10:5	9:2	*	7:6	9:2	7:11	5	1	1
A5	Italy	16:2	5:6	6:1	6:7	*	4:8	6:11	2	4	5
A6	Sweden	7:5	5:6	6:5	2:9	8:4	*	8:2	4	2	4
A7	Switzerland	9:4	9:10	14:4	11:7	11:6	2:8	*	4	2	2

Group B

	Team	B1	B2	B3	B4	B5	B6	B7	W	L	Place
B1	Denmark	*	8:4	9:3	10:3	2:8	9:11	10:0	4	2	3
B2	Finland	4:8	*	8:6	12:6	4:9	2:9	5:6	2	4	4
B3	Luxembourg	3:9	6:8	*	4:5	6:14	4:9	8:7	1	5	6
B4	Netherlands	3:10	6:12	5:4	*	5:11	3:6	13:4	2	4	5
B5	Norway	8:2	9:4	14:6	11:5	*	5:4	14:3	6	0	1
B6	Scotland	11:9	9:2	9:4	6:3	4:5	*	8:2	5	1	2
B7	Wales	0:10	6:5	7:8	4:13	3:14	2:8	*	1	5	7

Teams to playoffs
Teams to tiebreaker

=== Tiebreaker ===
Round 1 (winner to round 2)		Round 2 (winner to playoffs)
		Switzerland	10
Switzerland	8	England	2
Sweden	3

=== Ranking games for 5th-14th places ===
For 13th place
Austria	2
Wales	7

For 11th place
France	7
Luxembourg	5

For 9th place
Italy	11
Netherlands	3

For 7th place
Sweden	7
Finland	4

For 5th place
England	9
Denmark	7

=== Playoffs ===
Semifinals
A(1)	Germany	3
B(2)	Scotland	5
B(1)	Norway	5
A(2)	Switzerland	7

Final
Scotland	3
Switzerland	10
Bronze game
Germany	1
Norway	9

=== Final standings ===
Place	Team	Skip	GP	W	L
1st place, gold medalist(s)	Switzerland	Peter Attinger Jr.	10	8	2
2nd place, silver medalist(s)	Scotland	Peter Wilson	8	6	2
3rd place, bronze medalist(s)	Norway	Kristian Sørum	8	7	1
4	Germany	Keith Wendorf	8	5	3
5	England	Bob Martin	8	5	3
6	Denmark	Frants Gufler	7	4	3
7	Sweden	Per Carlsén	8	5	3
8	Finland	Tapio Juntunen	7	2	5
9	Italy	Andrea Pavani	7	3	4
10	Netherlands	Wim Neeleman	7	2	5
11	France	Maurice Mercier	7	2	5
12	Luxembourg	Guy Schweich	7	1	6
13	Wales	John Hunt	7	2	5
14	Austria	Pepi Gasteiger	7	1	6

== Women's ==
=== Teams ===
Team	Skip	Third	Second	Lead	Curling club
Austria	Edeltraud Koudelka	Christl Naegle	Ingrid Märker	Veronika Hölzl	
Denmark	Helena Blach	Jette Olsen	Malene Krause	Lone Kristoffersen	Hvidovre CC, Hvidovre
England	Gwen French	Jean Picken	Mary Finlay	Doris Vickers	
Finland	Pirkko Haataja	Salme Palm	Leena Räsänen	Maija Pekaristo	
France	Huguette Jullien (fourth)	Andrée Dupont-Roc	Paulette Sulpice (skip)	Monique Tournier	
Germany	Almut Hege	Josefine Einsle	Suzanne Koch	Petra Tschetsch	
Italy	Maria-Grazzia Constantini	Tea Valt	Nella Alvera	Angela Constantini	
Luxembourg	Cilly Schweich	Madeleine van den Houten	Pat Bannerman	Marie Garritze	
Netherlands	Laura Van Imhoff	Gerrie Veening	Hanneke Veening	Jenny Bovenschen	
Norway	Anne Jøtun Bakke	Hilde Jøtun	Rikke Ramsfjell	Billie Skjerpen	
Scotland	Betty Eddie	Kathleen Clark	Liz MacLaren	Rose-May Griffin	
Sweden	Anette Norberg	Sofie Marmont	Anna Rindeskog	Louise Marmont	Härnösands CK, Härnösand
Switzerland	Irene Bürgi	Isabelle Köpfli	Evi Attinger	Brigitte Kienast	
Wales	Elizabeth Hunt	Helen Lyon	Anne Stone	Jean Robinson	

=== Round robin ===
Group A

	Team	A1	A2	A3	A4	A5	A6	A7	W	L	Place
A1	Denmark	*	13:4	11:3	6:7	11:7	8:6	6:11	4	2	3
A2	England	4:13	*	8:6	3:10	12:3	5:10	4:15	2	4	4
A3	Finland	3:11	6:8	*	7:10	5:8	0:10	2:19	0	6	7
A4	Italy	7:6	10:3	10:7	*	7:2	8:7	2:8	5	1	2
A5	Netherlands	7:11	3:12	8:5	2:7	*	9:8	3:10	2	4	6
A6	Scotland	6:8	10:5	10:0	7:8	8:9	*	5:6	2	4	5
A7	Sweden	11:6	15:4	19:2	8:2	10:3	6:5	*	6	0	1

Group B

	Team	B1	B2	B3	B4	B5	B6	B7	W	L	Place
B1	Austria	*	8:9	3:10	9:6	9:5	3:14	8:3	3	3	4
B2	France	9:8	*	7:14	7:6	10:9	5:10	10:4	4	2	3
B3	Germany	10:3	14:7	*	12:5	11:4	10:4	10:3	6	0	1
B4	Luxembourg	6:9	6:7	5:12	*	8:10	3:9	6:7	0	6	7
B5	Norway	5:9	9:10	4:11	10:8	*	3:10	12:3	2	4	5
B6	Switzerland	14:3	10:5	4:10	9:3	10:3	*	12:4	5	1	2
B7	Wales	3:8	4:10	3:10	7:6	3:12	4:12	*	1	5	6

Teams to playoffs

=== Ranking games for 5th-14th places ===
For 13th place
Finland	1
Luxembourg	8

For 11th place
Netherlands	8
Wales	13

For 9th place
Scotland	5
Norway	11

For 7th place
England	8
Austria	10

For 5th place
Denmark	12
France	5

=== Playoffs ===
Semifinals
A(1)	Sweden	8
B(2)	Switzerland	6
B(1)	Germany	10
A(2)	Italy	3

Final
Sweden	2
Germany	8
Bronze game
Switzerland	8
Italy	6

=== Final standings ===
Place	Team	Skip	GP	W	L
1st place, gold medalist(s)	Germany	Almut Hege	8	8	0
2nd place, silver medalist(s)	Sweden	Anette Norberg	8	7	1
3rd place, bronze medalist(s)	Switzerland	Irene Bürgi	8	6	2
4	Italy	Maria-Grazzia Constantini	8	5	3
5	Denmark	Helena Blach	7	5	2
6	France	Paulette Sulpice	7	4	3
7	Austria	Edeltraud Koudelka	7	4	3
8	England	Gwen French	7	2	5
9	Norway	Anne Jøtun Bakke	7	3	4
10	Scotland	Betty Eddie	7	2	5
11	Wales	Elizabeth Hunt	7	2	5
12	Netherlands	Laura Van Imhoff	7	2	5
13	Luxembourg	Cilly Schweich	7	1	6
14	Finland	Pirkko Haataja	7	0	7
