= Solène Coulot =

French curler (1989–2010)

Solène Coulot (French: [sɔlɛn kulo]; 21 March 1989 – 20 February 2010) was a French curler.

Coulot played third on her sister Marie's team from the Besançon Skating Club. In 2009, they won the French national championship. Coulot played in the 2009 World Junior Curling Championships for France, placing 9th (3–6 record). She also played in the 2009 World Mixed Doubles Curling Championship with her brother Wilfrid, placing 15th (4–4 record).

Coulot died, of an apparent suicide, on 20 February 2010 at the age of 20. She was scheduled to play for France at the 2010 World Junior Curling Championships in March of that year.
