= Claes Roxin =

Swedish male curler (born 1951)

- Curler ♂
- Born: 17 December 1951 (age 74)

Team
- Curling club: CK Ena, Enköping, Linköpings CK, Linköping

Curling career
- Member Association: Sweden
- World Championship: 1 (1987)
- European Championship: 2 (1986, 1988)
- Other appearances: World Senior Championships: 2 (2003, 2007)
Medal record
Curling
European Championships
Silver medal – second place	1986 Copenhagen
Swedish Men's Championship
Gold medal – first place	1986
Gold medal – first place	1988
World Senior Championships
Bronze medal – third place	2007 Edmonton

Claes Henning Roxin (born 17 December 1951) is a Swedish curler.

He is a 1986 European Championships silver medallist, a two-time Swedish men's champion (1986, 1988) and five-time Swedish mixed champion (1975, 1978, 1979, 1980, 1981).

== Awards ==
- In 1988 he was inducted into the Swedish Curling Hall of Fame.

== Teams ==
=== Men's ===
Season	Skip	Third	Second	Lead	Alternate	Coach	Events
1972–73	Göran Roxin	Claes Roxin	Ingemar Skoog	Bo Ore			SJCC 1973 (gold)
1985–86	Göran Roxin	Claes Roxin	Björn Roxin	Lars-Eric Roxin			SMCC 1986 (gold)
1986–87	Göran Roxin	Claes Roxin	Björn Roxin	Lars-Eric Roxin	Anders Ehrling (ECC)		ECC 1986 (silver); WCC 1987 (6th)
1987–88	Claes Roxin	Mats Brisegård	Björn Roxin	Lars-Eric Roxin			SMCC 1988 (gold)
1988–89	Claes Roxin	Mats Brisegård	Björn Roxin	Lars-Eric Roxin			ECC 1988 (4th)
2002–03	Göran Roxin	Claes Roxin	Björn Roxin	Lars-Eric Roxin		Michael Roxin	WSCC 2003 (7th)
2006–07	Claes Roxin	Göran Roxin	Björn Roxin	Lars-Eric Roxin	Karl Nordlund		WSCC 2007 (bronze)
2008–09	Hans Nyman	Claes Roxin	Göran Roxin	Karl Nordlund			
2011–12	Hakan Nyberg	Rickard Eriksson	Claes Roxin	K-G Pettersson			

=== Mixed ===
Season	Skip	Third	Second	Lead	Events
1975	Kjell Oscarius	Lilebil Hellström	Claes Roxin	Ulrika Åkerberg	SMxCC 1975 (gold)
1978	Göran Roxin	Ulrika Åkerberg	Claes Roxin	Marie Henriksson	SMxCC 1978 (gold)
1979	Göran Roxin	Ulrika Åkerberg	Claes Roxin	Marie Henriksson	SMxCC 1979 (gold)
1980	Göran Roxin	Ulrika Åkerberg	Claes Roxin	Marie Henriksson	SMxCC 1980 (gold)
1981	Göran Roxin	Ulrika Åkerberg	Claes Roxin	Helene Frestadius	SMxCC 1981 (gold)

== Personal life ==
His three brothers – Göran (twin brother), Björn and Lars-Eric – are also curlers.
