= Göran Roxin =

Swedish male curler (born 1951)

- Curler ♂
- Born: 17 December 1951 (age 74)

Team
- Curling club: Magnus Ladulås CK, Stockholm; CK Ena, Enköping, Linköpings CK, Linköping

Curling career
- Member Association: Sweden
- World Championship: 1 (1987)
- European Championship: 2 (1981, 1986)
- Other appearances: World Senior Championships: 3 (2003, 2007, 2010)
Medal record
Curling
European Championships
Silver medal – second place	1981 Grindelwald
Silver medal – second place	1986 Copenhagen
Swedish Men's Championship
Gold medal – first place	1986
World Senior Championships
Bronze medal – third place	2007 Edmonton

Nils Göran Roxin (born 17 December 1951) is a Swedish curler.

He is a two-time European Championships silver medallist (1981, 1986), a 1986 Swedish men's champion and five-time Swedish mixed champion (1978, 1979, 1980, 1981, 1985).

== Awards ==
- Collie Campbell Memorial Award: 1987
- In 1988 he was inducted into the Swedish Curling Hall of Fame.

== Teams ==
=== Men's ===
Season	Skip	Third	Second	Lead	Alternate	Coach	Events
1972–73	Göran Roxin	Claes Roxin	Ingemar Skoog	Bo Ore			SJCC 1973 (gold); WJCC 1973 (gold) (unofficial)
1981–82	Göran Roxin	Björn Rudström	Håkan Rudström	Christer Mårtensson	Hans Timan		ECC 1981 (silver)
1985–86	Göran Roxin	Claes Roxin	Björn Roxin	Lars-Eric Roxin			SMCC 1986 (gold)
1986–87	Göran Roxin	Claes Roxin	Björn Roxin	Lars-Eric Roxin	Anders Ehrling		ECC 1986 (silver); WCC 1987 (6th)
2002–03	Göran Roxin	Claes Roxin	Björn Roxin	Lars-Eric Roxin		Michael Roxin	WSCC 2003 (7th)
2006–07	Claes Roxin	Göran Roxin	Björn Roxin	Lars-Eric Roxin	Karl Nordlund		WSCC 2007 (bronze)
2008–09	Hans Nyman	Claes Roxin	Göran Roxin	Karl Nordlund			
2009–10	Karl Nordlund	Göran Roxin	Wolger Johansson	Per-Arne Andersson	Owe Larsson	Karl-Gustav Pettersson	WSCC 2010 (5th)

=== Mixed ===
Season	Skip	Third	Second	Lead	Events
1978	Göran Roxin	Ulrika Åkerberg	Claes Roxin	Marie Henriksson	SMxCC 1978 (gold)
1979	Göran Roxin	Ulrika Åkerberg	Claes Roxin	Marie Henriksson	SMxCC 1979 (gold)
1980	Göran Roxin	Ulrika Åkerberg	Claes Roxin	Marie Henriksson	SMxCC 1980 (gold)
1981	Göran Roxin	Ulrika Åkerberg	Claes Roxin	Helene Frestadius	SMxCC 1981 (gold)
1985	Axel Kamp	Gertrud Kamp	Göran Roxin	Marie Henriksson	SMxCC 1985 (gold)

== Personal life ==
His three brothers – Claes (twin brother), Björn and Lars-Eric – are also curlers.
