= Björn Roxin =

Swedish male curler (born 1950)

- Curler ♂
- Born: 19 May 1950 (age 76)

Team
- Curling club: CK Ena, Enköping, Linköpings CK, Linköping

Curling career
- Member Association: Sweden
- World Championship: 1 (1987)
- European Championship: 2 (1986, 1988)
- Other appearances: World Senior Championships: 2 (2003, 2007)
Medal record
Curling
European Championships
| Silver medal – second place | 1986 Copenhagen |
Swedish Men's Championship
| Gold medal – first place | 1986 |
| Gold medal – first place | 1988 |
World Senior Championships
| Bronze medal – third place | 2007 Edmonton |

Björn Håkan Roxin (born 19 May 1950) is a Swedish curler.

He is a 1986 European Championships silver medallist and a two-time Swedish men's champion (1986, 1988).

== Teams ==
| Season | Skip | Third | Second | Lead | Alternate | Coach | Events |
|---|---|---|---|---|---|---|---|
| 1985–86 | Göran Roxin | Claes Roxin | Björn Roxin | Lars-Eric Roxin | | | SMCC 1986 (gold) |
| 1986–87 | Göran Roxin | Claes Roxin | Björn Roxin | Lars-Eric Roxin | Anders Ehrling (ECC) | | ECC 1986 (silver); WCC 1987 (6th) |
| 1987–88 | Claes Roxin | Mats Brisegård | Björn Roxin | Lars-Eric Roxin | | | SMCC 1988 (gold) |
| 1988–89 | Claes Roxin | Mats Brisegård | Björn Roxin | Lars-Eric Roxin | | | ECC 1988 (4th) |
| 2002–03 | Göran Roxin | Claes Roxin | Björn Roxin | Lars-Eric Roxin | | Michael Roxin | WSCC 2003 (7th) |
| 2006–07 | Claes Roxin | Göran Roxin | Björn Roxin | Lars-Eric Roxin | Karl Nordlund | | WSCC 2007 (bronze) |
| 2015–16 | Anders Brandelius | Jeff Martin | Björn Roxin | Lars-Eric Roxin | | Anna-Tora Martin | SSCC 2016 (???th) |

== Personal life ==
His three brothers – Claes, Göran and Lars-Eric – are also curlers.
