= Catherine Lefebvre (curler) =

French curler (born 1959)

- Curler ♀
- Born: 1 May 1959 (age 67)

Team
- Curling club: Club de sports Megève, Megève

Curling career
- Member Association: France
- World Championship: 4 (1987, 1988, 1989, 1991)
- European Championship: 10 (1986, 1987, 1988, 1992, 1993, 1995, 2002, 2003, 2004, 2005)
- Olympic: 1 (1988 - demo)
Medal record
Curling
French Women's Championship
Gold medal – first place	1990
Gold medal – first place	1991
Gold medal – first place	1992
Gold medal – first place	1994
Gold medal – first place	1995
Gold medal – first place	1996

Catherine Lefebvre (born 1 May 1959) is a French curler.

She participated in the demonstration curling event at the 1988 Winter Olympics, where the French women's team finished in eighth place.

== Teams ==
Season	Skip	Third	Second	Lead	Alternate	Coach	Events
1986–87	Andrée Dupont-Roc (fourth)	Agnes Mercier	Catherine Lefebvre	Annick Mercier (skip)			ECC 1986 (5th)
1986–87	Annick Mercier (fourth)	Agnes Mercier (skip)	Andrée Dupont-Roc	Catherine Lefebvre			WCC 1987 (8th)
1987–88	Agnes Mercier	Annick Mercier	Andrée Dupont-Roc	Catherine Lefebvre			ECC 1987 (4th)
1987–88	Annick Mercier	Agnes Mercier	Andrée Dupont-Roc	Catherine Lefebvre			WOG 1988 (demo) (8th); WCC 1988 (8th)
1988–89	Agnes Mercier	Annick Mercier	Andrée Dupont-Roc	Catherine Lefebvre			ECC 1988 (10th)
1988–89	Agnes Mercier (fourth)	Catherine Lefebvre	Annick Mercier (skip)	Andrée Dupont-Roc			WCC 1989 (6th)
1990–91	Annick Mercier	Catherine Lefebvre	Brigitte Lamy	Claire Niatel	Brigitte Collard		WCC 1991 (8th)
1992–93	Annick Mercier	Catherine Lefebvre	Géraldine Girod	Claire Niatel			ECC 1992 (10th)
1993–94	Annick Mercier	Catherine Lefebvre	Mireille Mercier	Veronique Gannaz	Fabienne Morand		ECC 1993 (9th)
1995–96	Annick Mercier	Catherine Lefebvre	Mireille Mercier	Fabienne Morand	Nadia Bénier	Heidi Schlapbach, Patrick Philippe	ECC 1995 (13th)
2002–03	Sandrine Morand	Catherine Lefebvre	Audrey Delphino	Sophie Favre-Félix	Frédérique Jacob		ECC 2002 (10th)
2003–04	Sandrine Morand	Catherine Lefebvre	Audrey Delphino	Sophie Favre-Félix	Frédérique Jacob	Robert Biondina	ECC 2003 (12th)
2004–05	Sandrine Morand	Catherine Lefebvre	Jocelyn Cault-Lhenry	Sophie Favre-Félix	Caroline Saint-Cricq	Robert Biondina	ECC 2004 (13th)
2005–06	Sandrine Morand	Catherine Lefebvre	Caroline Saint-Cricq	Delphine Charlet	Jocelyn Cault-Lhenry	Alain Contat	ECC 2005 (15th)
