= Kurt Attinger =

Swiss curler

- Curler ♂

Team
- Curling club: CC Dübendorf, Dübendorf

Curling career
- Member Association: Switzerland
- World Championship: 1 (1984)
- European Championship: 1 (1984)
Medal record
Curling
World Championships
Silver medal – second place	1984 Duluth
European Championships
Gold medal – first place	1984 Morzine
Swiss Men's Championship
Gold medal – first place	1984
Silver medal – second place	1980
Bronze medal – third place	1982
Bronze medal – third place	1983
Bronze medal – third place	1987

Kurt Attinger was a Swiss curler. He played lead position on the Swiss rink that won the 1984 European Curling Championships and a silver medal at the 1984 World Men's Championship.

== Teams ==
Season	Skip	Third	Second	Lead	Events
1973–74	Bernhard Attinger	Kurt Attinger	Ruedi Attinger	Louis Keller	SJCC 1974 (gold); WJCC 1974 (gold) (unofficial)
1979–80	Peter Attinger Jr.	Bernhard Attinger	Mattias Neuenschwander	Kurt Attinger	SMCC 1980 (silver)
1981–82	Peter Attinger Jr.	Bernhard Attinger	Ruedi Attinger	Kurt Attinger	SMCC 1982 (bronze)
1982–83	Peter Attinger Jr.	Bernhard Attinger	Ruedi Attinger	Kurt Attinger	SMCC 1983 (bronze)
1983–84	Peter Attinger Jr.	Bernhard Attinger	Werner Attinger	Kurt Attinger	SMCC 1984 (gold); WCC 1984 (silver)
1984–85	Peter Attinger Jr.	Bernhard Attinger	Werner Attinger	Kurt Attinger	ECC 1984 (gold)
1986–87	Peter Attinger Jr.	Werner Attinger	Martin Zürrer	Kurt Attinger	SMCC 1987 (bronze)

== Private life ==
Attinger grew up in a family of curlers. His father Peter Sr. is a 1972 Swiss men's champion. His brothers - Peter Jr., Bernhard, Ruedi and Werner are curlers too. They won Swiss and European championships and Worlds medals when they played on Peter Jr.'s team. His nephew (Peter Jr.'s son) Felix is the skip of a team that won the Swiss men's silver in 2017 and bronze in 2016, with Peter Jr. coaching this team. Bernhard's daughter, Sandra Ramstein-Attinger is a competitive curler too. She played in three Women's Worlds with teams skipped by Silvana Tirinzoni and Binia Feltscher-Beeli.

Kurt Attinger died in 2011 of cancer.
