= Ruedi Attinger =

Swiss male curler

- Curler ♂

Team
- Curling club: CC Dübendorf, Dübendorf

Curling career
- Member Association: Switzerland
- World Championship: 1 (1979)
- European Championship: 1 (1976)
Medal record
Curling
World Championships
Silver medal – second place	1979 Bern
European Championships
Gold medal – first place	1976 West Berlin
Swiss Men's Championship
Gold medal – first place	1979
Silver medal – second place	1978
Silver medal – second place	1981
Bronze medal – third place	1982
Bronze medal – third place	1983

Ruedi Attinger is a former Swiss curler. He played lead position on the Swiss rink that won two 1976 European Curling Championships and a silver medal at the 1979 World Men's Championship.

== Teams ==
Season	Skip	Third	Second	Lead	Events
1973–74	Bernhard Attinger	Kurt Attinger	Ruedi Attinger	Louis Keller	SJCC 1974 (gold); WJCC 1974 (gold) (unofficial)
1976–77	Peter Attinger Jr.	Bernhard Attinger	Mattias Neuenschwander	Ruedi Attinger	ECC 1976 (gold)
1977–78	Peter Attinger Jr.	Bernhard Attinger	Mattias Neuenschwander	Ruedi Attinger	SMCC 1978 (silver)
1978–79	Peter Attinger Jr.	Bernhard Attinger	Mattias Neuenschwander	Ruedi Attinger	SMCC 1979 (gold); WCC 1979 (silver)
1980–81	Peter Attinger Jr.	Bernhard Attinger	Mattias Neuenschwander	Ruedi Attinger	SMCC 1981 (silver)
1981–82	Peter Attinger Jr.	Bernhard Attinger	Ruedi Attinger	Kurt Attinger	SMCC 1982 (bronze)
1982–83	Peter Attinger Jr.	Bernhard Attinger	Ruedi Attinger	Kurt Attinger	SMCC 1983 (bronze)

== Private life ==
Attinger grew up in a family of curlers. His father Peter Sr. is a 1972 Swiss men's champion. His brothers, Peter Jr., Werner, Bernhard and Kurt are curlers too. They won Swiss and European championships and Worlds medals when they played on Peter Jr.'s team. His nephew (Peter Jr.'s son) Felix is a skip of a team that won the Swiss men's silver in 2017 and bronze in 2016; Peter Jr. coached his team. Bernhard's daughter Sandra Ramstein-Attinger is a competitive curler too. She played on three Women's Worlds with teams skipped by Silvana Tirinzoni and Binia Feltscher-Beeli.
