= Annick Mercier =

French curler (born 1964)

- Curler ♀
- Born: 15 June 1964 (age 62); Sallanches

Team
- Curling club: Club de sports Megève, Megève

Curling career
- Member Association: France
- World Championship: 5 (1987, 1988, 1989, 1990, 1991)
- European Championship: 7 (1986, 1987, 1988, 1991, 1992, 1993, 1995)
- Olympic: 2 (1988, 1992 - demo events)
Medal record
Curling
French Women's Championship
Gold medal – first place	1990
Gold medal – first place	1991
Gold medal – first place	1992
Gold medal – first place	1994
Gold medal – first place	1995
Gold medal – first place	1996

Annick Mercier (born 15 June 1964 in Sallanches) is a French curler. She took part in the curling demonstration events at the 1988 Winter Olympics and the 1992 Winter Olympics, where the French women's team placed eighth and seventh respectively. At the national level, Mercier is a six-time winner of the French Women's Curling Championship (1990, 1991, 1992, 1994, 1995, 1996).

== Teams ==
Season	Skip	Third	Second	Lead	Alternate	Coach	Events
1986–87	Andrée Dupont-Roc (fourth)	Agnes Mercier	Catherine Lefebvre	Annick Mercier (skip)			ECC 1986 (5th)
1986–87	Annick Mercier (fourth)	Agnes Mercier (skip)	Andrée Dupont-Roc	Catherine Lefebvre			WCC 1987 (8th)
1987–88	Agnes Mercier	Annick Mercier	Andrée Dupont-Roc	Catherine Lefebvre			ECC 1987 (4th)
1987–88	Annick Mercier	Agnes Mercier	Andrée Dupont-Roc	Catherine Lefebvre			WOG 1988 (demo) (8th); WCC 1988 (8th)
1988–89	Agnes Mercier	Annick Mercier	Andrée Dupont-Roc	Catherine Lefebvre			ECC 1988 (10th)
1988–89	Agnes Mercier (fourth)	Catherine Lefebvre	Annick Mercier (skip)	Andrée Dupont-Roc			WCC 1989 (6th)
1989–90	Brigitte Lamy	Paulette Sulpice	Jocelyn Lhenry	Guylaine Fratucello	Annick Mercier		WCC 1990 (9th)
1990–91	Annick Mercier	Catherine Lefebvre	Brigitte Lamy	Claire Niatel	Brigitte Collard		WCC 1991 (8th)
1991–92	Annick Mercier	Brigitte Lamy	Claire Niatel	Brigitte Collard	Géraldine Girod		ECC 1991 (7th)
1991–92	Annick Mercier	Brigitte Lamy	Géraldine Girod	Claire Niatel	Brigitte Collard		WOG 1992 (demo) (7th)
1992–93	Annick Mercier	Catherine Lefebvre	Géraldine Girod	Claire Niatel			ECC 1992 (10th)
1993–94	Annick Mercier	Catherine Lefebvre	Mireille Mercier	Veronique Gannaz	Fabienne Morand		ECC 1993 (9th)
1995–96	Annick Mercier	Catherine Lefebvre	Mireille Mercier	Fabienne Morand	Nadia Bénier	Heidi Schlapbach, Patrick Philippe	ECC 1995 (13th)

== Personal life ==
Mercier comes from a curling family. Her mother Agnès won the French women's championship several times, played in several World and European championships, and was a member of the 1988 Winter Olympic team alongside Annick. Her younger brother, Thierry, also curls and coaches. He has also won several French championships, participated in several World and European championships, and competed in the 1992 Winter Olympics.
