= Agnès Mercier =

French curler and coach

- Curler ♀

Team
- Curling club: Club de sports Megève, Megève, CC Mont d'Arbois, Megève

Curling career
- Member Association: France
- World Championship: 7 (1980, 1982, 1983, 1984, 1987, 1988, 1989)
- European Championship: 6 (1981, 1982, 1983, 1986, 1987, 1988)
- Olympic: 1 (1988 - demo)
Medal record
Curling
French Women's Championship
Gold medal – first place	1971
Gold medal – first place	1974
Gold medal – first place	1986
Gold medal – first place	1987
Gold medal – first place	1988

Agnès Mercier is a French curler and curling coach.

She participated in the demonstration curling events at the 1988 Winter Olympics, where the French women's team finished in eighth place.

At the national level, she is a five-time French women's champion curler (1971, 1974, 1986, 1987, 1988).

== Teams ==
Season	Skip	Third	Second	Lead	Events
1979–80	Paulette Sulpice	Agnes Mercier	Huguette Jullien	Anne-Claude Wolfers	WCC 1980 (6th)
1981–82	Huguette Jullien (fourth)	Agnes Mercier	Paulette Sulpice (skip)	Anne-Claude Kennerson	ECC 1981 (5th)
1981–82	Huguette Jullien (fourth)	Agnes Mercier	Paulette Sulpice (skip)	Eva Duvillard	WCC 1982 (6th)
1982–83	Huguette Jullien (fourth)	Agnes Mercier	Paulette Sulpice (skip)	Monique Tournier	ECC 1982 (5th); WCC 1983 (5th)
1983–84	Huguette Jullien (fourth)	Agnes Mercier	Monique Tournier	Paulette Sulpice (skip)	ECC 1983 (6th)
1983–84	Huguette Jullien (fourth)	Agnes Mercier	Andrée Dupont-Roc	Paulette Sulpice (skip)	ЧМ 1984 (7 место)
1986–87	Andrée Dupont-Roc (fourth)	Agnes Mercier	Catherine Lefebvre	Annick Mercier (skip)	ECC 1986 (5th)
1986–87	Annick Mercier (fourth)	Agnes Mercier (skip)	Andrée Dupont-Roc	Catherine Lefebvre	WCC 1987 (8th)
1987–88	Agnes Mercier	Annick Mercier	Andrée Dupont-Roc	Catherine Lefebvre	ECC 1987 (4th)
1987–88	Annick Mercier	Agnes Mercier	Andrée Dupont-Roc	Catherine Lefebvre	WOG 1988 (demo) (8th); WCC 1988 (8th)
1988–89	Agnes Mercier	Annick Mercier	Andrée Dupont-Roc	Catherine Lefebvre	ECC 1988 (10th)
1988–89	Agnes Mercier (fourth)	Catherine Lefebvre	Annick Mercier (skip)	Andrée Dupont-Roc	WCC 1989 (6th)

== Record as a coach of national teams ==
Year	Tournament, event	National team	Place
2000	2000 European Curling Championships	France (women)	8

== Personal life ==
Agnes Mercier is from family of curlers: her daughter Annick and son Thierry are known French curlers, many times French champions, they competed on 1988 and 1992 Winter Olympics, number of Worlds and Euros.
