= Jocelyn Cault-Lhenry =

French curler

- Curler ♀
- Born: Jocelyn Lhenry

Team
- Curling club: Mont d'Arbois CC, Megève, Club de sports Megève, Megève

Curling career
- Member Association: France
- World Championship: 4 (1985, 1986, 1990, 1995)
- European Championship: 5 (1985, 1989, 1994, 2004, 2005)
Medal record
Curling

Jocelyn Cault-Lhenry (born as Jocelyn Lhenry) is a French curler.

== Teams ==
Season	Skip	Third	Second	Lead	Alternate	Coach	Events
1984–85	Huguette Jullien (fourth)	Paulette Sulpice (skip)	Andrée Dupont-Roc	Jocelyn Lhenry			WCC 1985 (8th)
1985–86	Paulette Sulpice	Huguette Jullien	Isabelle Quere	Jocelyn Lhenry			ECC 1985 (10th)
1985–86	Huguette Jullien (fourth)	Paulette Sulpice (skip)	Isabelle Quere	Jocelyn Lhenry			WCC 1986 (9th)
1989–90	Paulette Sulpice	Brigitte Lamy	Jocelyn Lhenry	Guylaine Fratucello			ECC 1989 (7th)
1989–90	Brigitte Lamy	Paulette Sulpice	Jocelyn Lhenry	Guylaine Fratucello	Annick Mercier		WCC 1990 (9th)
1994–95	Brigitte Lamy	Jocelyn Lhenry	Gaetane Bibollet	Brigitte Collard	Laurence Prunet	Heidi Schlapbach	ECC 1994 (7th)
1994–95	Brigitte Lamy	Jocelyn Cault-Lhenry	Gaetane Bibollet	Brigitte Collard	Tatiana Ducroz		WCC 1995 (10th)
2004–05	Sandrine Morand	Catherine Lefebvre	Jocelyn Cault-Lhenry	Sophie Favre-Félix	Caroline Saint-Cricq	Robert Biondina	ECC 2004 (13th)
2005–06	Sandrine Morand	Catherine Lefebvre	Caroline Saint-Cricq	Delphine Charlet	Jocelyn Cault-Lhenry	Alain Contat	ECC 2005 (15th)
