= Sandra Ramstein-Attinger =

Swiss curler

- Curler ♀
- Born: Sandra Attinger

Team
- Curling club: CC Dübendorf, Dübendorf, Flims PurePower CC, Flims

Curling career
- Member Association: Switzerland
- World Championship: 3 (2006, 2007, 2010)
Medal record
Curling
Swiss Women's Championship
Gold medal – first place	2010 Bern

Sandra Ramstein-Attinger (born as Sandra Attinger, also known as Sandra Ramstein) is a Swiss curler.

At the national level, she is a 2010 Swiss women's champion.

== Teams ==
Season	Skip	Third	Second	Lead	Alternate	Coach	Events
2005–06	Silvana Tirinzoni	Sandra Attinger	Anna Neuenschwander	Esther Neuenschwander	Carmen Schäfer	Erika Müller	WCC 2006 (10th)
2006–07	Silvana Tirinzoni	Esther Neuenschwander	Anna Neuenschwander	Sandra Attinger	Mirjam Ott	Silvia Moser	WCC 2007 (5th)
2007–08	Binia Feltscher-Beeli	Sandra Attinger	Yvonne Schlunegger	Corinne Bourquin			
2008–09	Binia Feltscher-Beeli	Sandra Ramstein-Attinger	Sibille Buhlmann	Corinne Bourquin			
2009–10	Binia Feltscher	Corinne Bourquin	Sibille Bühlmann	Sandra Ramstein	Yvonne Schlunegger, Heike Schwaller	Gaudenz Beeli	SWCC 2010 (gold)
2009–10	Binia Feltscher-Beeli	Corinne Bourquin	Heike Schwaller	Sandra Ramstein-Attinger	Marisa Winkelhausen	Gaudenz Beeli, Lorne Hamblin	WCC 2010 (10th)
2010–11	Binia Feltscher-Beeli	Marlene Albrecht	Franziska Kaufmann	Christine Urech	Sandra Ramstein, Heike Schwaller, Martina Baumann, A. Schlunegger	Gaudenz Beeli	SWCC 2011 (4th)
2011–12	Corinne Bourquin	Fabienne Fürbringer	Daniela Rupp	Sandra Ramstein	Janine Wyss	Björn Schröder	SWCC 2012 (6th)
2012–13	Melanie Wild	Sandra Ramstein-Attinger	Daniela Rupp	Janine Wyss			
2012–13	Sandra Ramstein	Daniela Rupp	Melanie Wild	Janine Wyss	Lea Jauch, Corinne Bourquin		SWCC 2013 (6th)

== Private life ==
Sandra Attinger grew up in the Attinger family of Swiss curlers. Her father Bernhard with his brothers - Peter Jr., Werner, Ruedi and Kurt - won Swiss and European championships and Worlds medals when they played on Peter Jr.'s team. Her grandfather Peter Sr. is a 1972 Swiss men's champion (he was skip of a team where Bernhard played and won his first national men's gold in 1972). Peter Jr.'s son Felix is a skip of a team that won the Swiss men's silver in 2017 and bronze in 2016. Peter Jr. coached his team.
