= Lars-Eric Roxin =

Swedish male curler (born 1945)

- Curler ♂
- Born: 15 February 1945 (age 81)

Team
- Curling club: CK Ena, Enköping, Linköpings CK, Linköping

Curling career
- Member Association: Sweden
- World Championship: 1 (1987)
- European Championship: 2 (1986, 1988)
- Other appearances: World Senior Championships: 2 (2003, 2007)
Medal record
Curling
European Championships
Silver medal – second place	1986 Copenhagen
Swedish Men's Championship
Gold medal – first place	1986
Gold medal – first place	1988
World Senior Championships
Bronze medal – third place	2007 Edmonton

Lars-Eric Roxin (born 15 February 1945) is a Swedish curler.

He is a 1986 European Championships silver medallist and a two-time Swedish men's champion (1986, 1988).

In 2022 he was inducted into the Swedish Curling Hall of Fame.

== Teams ==
Season	Skip	Third	Second	Lead	Alternate	Coach	Events
1985–86	Göran Roxin	Claes Roxin	Björn Roxin	Lars-Eric Roxin			SMCC 1986 (gold)
1986–87	Göran Roxin	Claes Roxin	Björn Roxin	Lars-Eric Roxin	Anders Ehrling (ECC)		ECC 1986 (silver); WCC 1987 (6th)
1987–88	Claes Roxin	Mats Brisegård	Björn Roxin	Lars-Eric Roxin			SMCC 1988 (gold)
1988–89	Claes Roxin	Mats Brisegård	Björn Roxin	Lars-Eric Roxin			ECC 1988 (4th)
2002–03	Göran Roxin	Claes Roxin	Björn Roxin	Lars-Eric Roxin		Michael Roxin	WSCC 2003 (7th)
2006–07	Claes Roxin	Göran Roxin	Björn Roxin	Lars-Eric Roxin	Karl Nordlund		WSCC 2007 (bronze)
2015–16	Anders Brandelius	Jeff Martin	Björn Roxin	Lars-Eric Roxin		Anna-Tora Martin	SSCC 2016 (???th)

== Personal life ==
His three brothers – Claes, Göran and Björn – are also curlers.
