= Marcel Senn =

Swiss cyclist

Personal information
- Born: 10 July 1934 (age 92)

Cycling career
- Sport: Cycling
- Role: Rider

Marcel Senn (born 10 July 1934) is a Swiss racing cyclist. He rode in the 1957 Tour de France.
