= French Women's Curling Championship =

France has had a national women's curling championship since 1971.

Year	Skip	Locale
1971	Agnes Mercier	Megève
1972	H. Pfirter	Paris
1973	C. Barraud	Saint-Gervais
1974	Agnes Mercier	Megève
1975	Paulette Delachat	Megève
1976	Paulette Delachat	Mt. d'Arbois (Megève)
1977	Paulette Delachat	Mt. d'Arbois (Megève)
1978	Paulette Delachat	Mt. d'Arbois (Megève)
1979	Paulette Delachat	Mt. d'Arbois (Megève)
1980	Paulette Sulpice	Mt. d'Arbois (Megève)
1981	Mme. Schneider	Strasbourg
1982	Paulette Sulpice	Mt. d'Arbois (Megève)
1983	Paulette Sulpice	Mt. d'Arbois (Megève)
1984	Paulette Sulpice	Mt. d'Arbois (Megève)
1985	Paulette Sulpice	Mt. d'Arbois (Megève)
1986	Agnes Mercier	Megève
1987	Agnes Mercier	Megève
1988	Agnes Mercier	Megève
1989	Brigitte Lamy	Megève
1990	Annick Mercier	Megève
1991	Annick Mercier	Megève
1992	Annick Mercier	Megève
1993	Laurence Bibollet	Les Contamines
1994	Annick Mercier	Megève
1995	Annick Mercier	Megève
1996	Annick Mercier	Megève
1997	Andrée Dupont-Roc	Megève
1998	Not held	
1999	Audé Bénier	Saint-Gervais
2000	Sandrine Morand	Megève
2001	Sandrine Morand	Megève
2002	Sandrine Morand	Megève
2003	Sandrine Morand	Megève
2004	Sandrine Morand	Megève
2005	Sandrine Morand	Megève
2006	Karine Baechelen	Chamonix
2007	Karine Baechelen	Chamonix
2008	Sandrine Morand	Chamonix
2009	Marie Coulot	Besançon
2010	Marie Coulot	Besançon
2011	Marie Coulot	Besançon
2012	Charlotte Duquet	Besançon
2013	Pauline Jeanneret	Besançon
2014	Pauline Jeanneret	Besançon
2015	Pauline Jeanneret	Besançon
2016	Manon Humbert	Besançon
