= Shirley McKendry =

Canadian female curler

- Curler ♀

Team
- Curling club: Caledonian CC, Regina, SK

Curling career
- Member Association: Saskatchewan
- Hearts: 2: (1980, 1982)
- World Championship: 1 (1980)
Medal record
Curling
Representing Canada
World Championships
Gold medal – first place	1980 Perth
Representing Saskatchewan
Scott Tournament of Hearts
Gold medal – first place	1980 Edmonton
Bronze medal – third place	1982 Regina

Shirley McKendry is a Canadian curler.

She is a 1980 World women's champion and 1980 Scott Tournament of Hearts champion.

In 2000, she was inducted into Canadian Curling Hall of Fame together with all of the 1980 Marj Mitchell team.

On the March 21, 1981 she was installed to Saskatchewan Sports Hall of Fame with all of the 1980 Marj Mitchell team.

== Teams ==
Season	Skip	Third	Second	Lead	Events
1979–80	Marj Mitchell	Nancy Kerr	Shirley McKendry	Wendy Leach	STOH 1980 (gold); WCC 1980 (gold)
1981–82	Arleen Day	Shirley McKendry	Velva Squire	Dorthy Hepper	STOH 1982 (silver)
