= 1980 Canadian Ladies Curling Association Championship =

Canadian women's curling championship

- Host city: Edmonton, Alberta
- Arena: Northlands Gardens
- Dates: February 23–March 1
- Attendance: 4,538
- Winner: Saskatchewan
- Curling club: Caledonian Ladies CC, Regina
- Skip: Marj Mitchell
- Third: Nancy Kerr
- Second: Shirley McKendry
- Lead: Wendy Leach
- Finalist: Nova Scotia (Colleen Jones)

The 1980 Canadian Ladies Curling Association Championship (nicknamed "The Lassie") the Canadian women's curling championship, was held from February 23 to March 1, 1980 at Northlands Gardens in Edmonton, Alberta. Attendance for the event was just 4,538, with about 700 witnessing the final.

Team Saskatchewan, who was skipped by Marj Mitchell captured the championship by defeating Nova Scotia in the final 6–5. Saskatchewan had previously defeated British Columbia 7–4 in a tiebreaker and Ontario 7–5 in the semifinal. This was Saskatchewan's eighth title and first since 1974 and the only championship won by Mitchell. This was also Mitchell's last appearance in the national championship as she died from cancer in 1983.

Mitchell's rink would go onto represent Canada in the 1980 Royal Bank of Scotland World Women's Curling Championship, the women's world curling championship, which they also won.

== Teams ==
The teams are listed as follows:

Alberta	British Columbia	Manitoba	New Brunswick
Lethbridge CC, Lethbridge Skip: Barbara Davis; Third: Gayle Pilling; Second: Jane Rempel; Lead: Lyn Harker	Royal City Ladies CC, New Westminster Skip: Joan Dexter; Third: Louise Logan; Second: Nancy Turney; Lead: Lynne Axford	East St. Paul Business Girls CC, East St. Paul Skip: Donna Brownridge; Third: Patti Vande; Second: Carolyn Hall; Lead: Connie Laliberte	Beausejour CC, Moncton Skip: Denise Lavigne; Third: Marie-Anne Vautour; Second: Bonnie Anne Rayworth; Lead: Susan Goulet
Newfoundland	Nova Scotia	Ontario	Prince Edward Island
Carol CC, Labrador City Skip: Sue Anne Bartlett; Third: Patricia Dwyer; Second: Beverley Whitten; Lead: Mavis Pike	CFB Halifax CC, Halifax Skip: Colleen Jones; Third: Sally Jane Saunders; Second: Margaret Knickle; Lead: Barbara Jones	St. Catharines G&YC, St. Catharines Skip: Christine Bodogh; Third: Marilyn Darte; Second: Norma Quesnell; Lead: Mary Gellard	Crapaud Community CC, Crapaud Skip: Elayne Thompson; Third: Ruth Cutcliffe; Second: Louise Thomson; Lead: Julie Robinson
Quebec	Saskatchewan	Northwest Territories/Yukon
Mount Bruno CC, Saint-Bruno-de-Montarville Skip: Dorothy Crowe; Third: Nicole Marcotte; Second: Joan Johnston; Lead: Carolyn LeCraw	Caledonian Ladies CC, Regina Skip: Marj Mitchell; Third: Nancy Kerr; Second: Shirley McKendry; Lead: Wendy Leach	Yellowknife CC, Yellowknife Skip: Cathy Shaw; Third: Donna Alexander; Second: Lee Brooks; Lead: Marilyn Paradis

== Map of teams ==
Provincial Winners

== Round Robin standings ==
Final Round Robin standings

Key
Teams to Playoffs
Teams to Tiebreakers

Team	Skip	W	L	PF	PA
Nova Scotia	Colleen Jones	9	1	82	51
Ontario	Christine Bodogh	6	4	63	53
British Columbia	Joan Dexter	6	4	72	75
Saskatchewan	Marj Mitchell	6	4	70	55
Alberta	Barbara Davis	6	4	79	60
Northwest Territories/Yukon	Cathy Shaw	5	5	69	76
Manitoba	Donna Brownridge	4	6	72	72
Newfoundland	Sue Anne Bartlett	4	6	63	64
Quebec	Dorothy Crowe	4	6	64	83
New Brunswick	Denise Lavigne	4	6	66	77
Prince Edward Island	Elayne Thompson	1	9	57	91

== Round Robin results ==
All draw times are listed in Mountain Standard Time (UTC-07:00)

=== Draw 1 ===
Saturday, February 23, 8:00 pm

Team	1	2	3	4	5	6	7	8	9	10	Final
Manitoba (Brownridge)	0	1	0	2	0	1	0	0	X	X	4
Alberta (Davis)	3	0	0	0	1	0	4	3	X	X	11

Team	1	2	3	4	5	6	7	8	9	10	Final
Nova Scotia (Jones)	1	1	0	2	0	3	3	1	X	X	11
New Brunswick (Lavigne)	0	0	1	0	1	0	0	0	X	X	2

Team	1	2	3	4	5	6	7	8	9	10	Final
Northwest Territories/Yukon (Shaw)	0	2	1	1	0	0	1	0	1	1	7
Newfoundland (Bartlett)	1	0	0	0	1	1	0	1	0	0	4

Team	1	2	3	4	5	6	7	8	9	10	Final
Ontario (Bodogh)	0	0	0	0	3	1	0	2	1	X	7
Prince Edward Island (Thompson)	0	1	0	1	0	0	1	0	0	X	3

Team	1	2	3	4	5	6	7	8	9	10	Final
British Columbia (Dexter)	1	0	0	0	0	1	0	1	0	X	3
Quebec (Crowe)	0	0	1	1	0	0	1	0	2	X	5

=== Draw 2 ===
Sunday, February 24, 2:00 pm

Team	1	2	3	4	5	6	7	8	9	10	Final
Quebec (Crowe)	0	1	0	0	1	0	2	0	1	X	5
Alberta (Davis)	2	0	2	3	0	2	0	2	0	X	11

Team	1	2	3	4	5	6	7	8	9	10	Final
Northwest Territories/Yukon (Shaw)	2	0	0	0	1	1	0	2	0	1	7
Saskatchewan (Mitchell)	0	2	0	0	0	0	2	0	1	0	5

Team	1	2	3	4	5	6	7	8	9	10	11	Final
British Columbia (Dexter)	0	2	0	2	0	0	3	0	1	1	0	9
New Brunswick (Lavigne)	1	0	3	0	2	2	0	1	0	0	2	11

Team	1	2	3	4	5	6	7	8	9	10	Final
Newfoundland (Bartlett)	0	3	0	0	3	0	2	0	3	X	11
Prince Edward Island (Thompson)	1	0	2	1	0	2	0	1	0	X	7

Team	1	2	3	4	5	6	7	8	9	10	Final
Ontario (Bodogh)	0	1	0	0	0	1	0	0	1	X	3
Nova Scotia (Jones)	2	0	0	1	1	0	0	1	0	X	5

=== Draw 3 ===
Sunday, February 24, 8:00 pm

Team	1	2	3	4	5	6	7	8	9	10	Final
Prince Edward Island (Thompson)	0	0	1	0	0	0	X	X	X	X	1
Saskatchewan (Mitchell)	2	1	0	4	3	3	X	X	X	X	13

Team	1	2	3	4	5	6	7	8	9	10	Final
Newfoundland (Bartlett)	0	0	2	0	1	0	0	0	1	X	4
Nova Scotia (Jones)	0	2	0	0	0	1	1	2	0	X	6

Team	1	2	3	4	5	6	7	8	9	10	Final
British Columbia (Dexter)	0	0	0	1	0	0	3	0	1	X	5
Ontario (Bodogh)	1	2	1	0	1	1	0	2	0	X	8

Team	1	2	3	4	5	6	7	8	9	10	11	Final
Quebec (Crowe)	2	0	0	1	0	3	0	1	1	0	1	9
Manitoba (Brownridge)	0	2	1	0	1	0	2	0	0	2	0	8

Team	1	2	3	4	5	6	7	8	9	10	11	Final
Alberta (Davis)	2	0	0	0	2	0	3	0	1	0	0	8
New Brunswick (Lavigne)	0	1	1	1	0	1	0	2	0	2	1	9

=== Draw 4 ===
Monday, February 25, 2:00 pm

Team	1	2	3	4	5	6	7	8	9	10	Final
Prince Edward Island (Thompson)	0	4	0	2	0	2	1	1	0	X	10
Northwest Territories/Yukon (Shaw)	2	0	1	0	2	0	0	0	1	X	6

Team	1	2	3	4	5	6	7	8	9	10	Final
Newfoundland (Bartlett)	0	0	1	0	1	0	0	0	1	0	3
British Columbia (Dexter)	0	1	0	5	0	1	0	0	0	1	8

Team	1	2	3	4	5	6	7	8	9	10	Final
Alberta (Davis)	0	2	0	2	0	0	1	0	0	1	6
Ontario (Bodogh)	0	0	1	0	2	0	0	1	1	0	5

Team	1	2	3	4	5	6	7	8	9	10	Final
New Brunswick (Lavigne)	1	1	0	0	0	0	3	1	0	0	6
Manitoba (Brownridge)	0	0	1	1	1	1	0	0	2	1	7

Team	1	2	3	4	5	6	7	8	9	10	11	Final
Saskatchewan (Mitchell)	0	1	1	0	2	1	0	0	0	2	0	7
Nova Scotia (Jones)	1	0	0	3	0	0	1	1	1	0	1	8

=== Draw 5 ===
Monday, February 25, 8:00 pm

Team	1	2	3	4	5	6	7	8	9	10	Final
Nova Scotia (Jones)	0	1	0	0	1	0	1	1	0	2	6
Northwest Territories/Yukon (Shaw)	1	0	1	0	0	1	0	0	2	0	5

Team	1	2	3	4	5	6	7	8	9	10	Final
New Brunswick (Lavigne)	0	3	0	0	2	0	1	1	0	0	7
Quebec (Crowe)	2	0	1	3	0	1	0	0	1	1	9

Team	1	2	3	4	5	6	7	8	9	10	Final
Manitoba (Brownridge)	1	0	0	0	1	1	1	0	1	0	5
Ontario (Bodogh)	0	1	0	1	0	0	0	3	0	1	6

Team	1	2	3	4	5	6	7	8	9	10	Final
Alberta (Davis)	1	1	1	0	2	0	1	0	1	X	7
Newfoundland (Bartlett)	0	0	0	1	0	0	0	2	0	X	3

Team	1	2	3	4	5	6	7	8	9	10	Final
Saskatchewan (Mitchell)	0	2	0	1	0	0	0	3	0	X	6
British Columbia (Dexter)	3	0	2	0	1	2	1	0	1	X	10

=== Draw 6 ===
Tuesday, February 26, 2:00 pm

Team	1	2	3	4	5	6	7	8	9	10	Final
Nova Scotia (Jones)	0	3	0	3	0	2	0	2	0	X	10
Prince Edward Island (Thompson)	2	0	1	0	2	0	2	0	1	X	8

Team	1	2	3	4	5	6	7	8	9	10	Final
Manitoba (Brownridge)	1	0	3	0	2	0	1	0	0	2	9
Newfoundland (Bartlett)	0	1	0	1	0	2	0	3	1	0	8

Team	1	2	3	4	5	6	7	8	9	10	Final
Ontario (Bodogh)	1	0	1	1	0	1	0	1	1	1	7
Quebec (Crowe)	0	3	0	0	1	0	2	0	0	0	6

Team	1	2	3	4	5	6	7	8	9	10	11	Final
Saskatchewan (Mitchell)	0	2	0	1	1	0	1	0	1	0	1	7
Alberta (Davis)	0	0	3	0	0	1	0	1	0	1	0	6

Team	1	2	3	4	5	6	7	8	9	10	11	Final
Northwest Territories/Yukon (Shaw)	0	1	0	0	2	0	2	1	1	2	0	9
British Columbia (Dexter)	1	0	4	1	0	3	0	0	0	0	1	10

=== Draw 7 ===
Tuesday, February 26, 8:00 pm

Team	1	2	3	4	5	6	7	8	9	10	Final
Manitoba (Brownridge)	1	0	0	2	0	0	0	0	0	1	4
Saskatchewan (Mitchell)	0	1	1	0	1	1	0	0	1	0	5

Team	1	2	3	4	5	6	7	8	9	10	Final
Ontario (Bodogh)	0	1	1	0	0	1	0	0	1	X	4
New Brunswick (Lavigne)	1	0	0	2	1	0	2	1	0	X	7

Team	1	2	3	4	5	6	7	8	9	10	Final
British Columbia (Dexter)	0	0	1	2	0	2	0	2	0	1	8
Prince Edward Island (Thompson)	1	0	0	0	2	0	3	0	1	0	7

Team	1	2	3	4	5	6	7	8	9	10	Final
Northwest Territories/Yukon (Shaw)	0	2	0	4	0	1	0	0	1	1	9
Alberta (Davis)	2	0	1	0	1	0	3	1	0	0	8

Team	1	2	3	4	5	6	7	8	9	10	Final
Quebec (Crowe)	1	0	1	0	2	0	0	0	0	X	4
Newfoundland (Bartlett)	0	2	0	2	0	1	1	3	1	X	10

=== Draw 8 ===
Wednesday, February 27, 2:00 pm

Team	1	2	3	4	5	6	7	8	9	10	Final
Northwest Territories/Yukon (Shaw)	0	0	2	0	1	0	2	0	2	X	7
Manitoba (Brownridge)	2	1	0	2	0	3	0	2	0	X	10

Team	1	2	3	4	5	6	7	8	9	10	Final
Nova Scotia (Jones)	1	0	3	1	1	6	X	X	X	X	12
British Columbia (Dexter)	0	1	0	0	0	0	X	X	X	X	1

Team	1	2	3	4	5	6	7	8	9	10	Final
Quebec (Crowe)	1	0	0	1	0	1	0	0	0	X	3
Saskatchewan (Mitchell)	0	1	1	0	1	0	1	1	4	X	9

Team	1	2	3	4	5	6	7	8	9	10	Final
Prince Edward Island (Thompson)	0	1	0	1	1	0	0	2	1	0	6
Alberta (Davis)	3	0	3	0	0	1	0	0	0	1	8

Team	1	2	3	4	5	6	7	8	9	10	Final
Newfoundland (Bartlett)	2	0	4	0	1	0	1	0	2	X	10
New Brunswick (Lavigne)	0	1	0	3	0	3	0	1	0	X	8

=== Draw 9 ===
Wednesday, February 27, 8:00 pm

Team	1	2	3	4	5	6	7	8	9	10	Final
Prince Edward Island (Thompson)	0	0	2	0	0	0	0	X	X	X	2
Manitoba (Brownridge)	1	4	0	2	1	1	2	X	X	X	11

Team	1	2	3	4	5	6	7	8	9	10	Final
Alberta (Davis)	0	1	2	0	0	0	2	0	3	X	8
Nova Scotia (Jones)	1	0	0	1	1	1	0	1	0	X	5

Team	1	2	3	4	5	6	7	8	9	10	11	Final
Quebec (Crowe)	0	1	0	0	1	1	1	0	0	2	0	6
Northwest Territories/Yukon (Shaw)	2	0	0	1	0	0	0	1	2	0	3	9

Team	1	2	3	4	5	6	7	8	9	10	Final
Newfoundland (Bartlett)	0	2	1	1	0	1	0	1	0	X	6
Ontario (Bodogh)	0	0	0	0	1	0	1	0	1	X	3

Team	1	2	3	4	5	6	7	8	9	10	Final
New Brunswick (Lavigne)	1	0	1	2	0	0	0	1	0	X	5
Saskatchewan (Mitchell)	0	1	0	0	1	0	1	0	4	X	7

=== Draw 10 ===
Thursday, February 28, 2:00 pm

Team	1	2	3	4	5	6	7	8	9	10	Final
Northwest Territories/Yukon (Shaw)	1	1	1	0	0	2	0	1	0	X	6
New Brunswick (Lavigne)	0	0	0	1	0	0	2	0	1	X	4

Team	1	2	3	4	5	6	7	8	9	10	Final
Nova Scotia (Jones)	0	0	2	0	1	0	0	2	0	2	7
Manitoba (Brownridge)	1	1	0	1	0	2	0	0	1	0	6

Team	1	2	3	4	5	6	7	8	9	10	Final
Prince Edward Island (Thompson)	1	0	2	0	0	2	0	2	0	0	7
Quebec (Crowe)	0	3	0	2	0	0	1	0	3	1	10

Team	1	2	3	4	5	6	7	8	9	10	Final
Saskatchewan (Mitchell)	0	0	2	0	2	0	0	0	1	1	6
Ontario (Bodogh)	1	1	0	2	0	2	1	0	0	0	7

Team	1	2	3	4	5	6	7	8	9	10	11	Final
Alberta (Davis)	0	0	0	1	0	0	1	1	0	3	0	6
British Columbia (Dexter)	1	0	0	0	3	0	0	0	2	0	1	7

=== Draw 11 ===
Thursday, February 28, 8:00 pm

Team	1	2	3	4	5	6	7	8	9	10	Final
Ontario (Bodogh)	2	0	2	0	1	0	5	3	X	X	13
Northwest Territories/Yukon (Shaw)	0	1	0	2	0	1	0	0	X	X	4

Team	1	2	3	4	5	6	7	8	9	10	Final
New Brunswick (Lavigne)	0	1	0	2	0	2	1	0	0	1	7
Prince Edward Island (Thompson)	1	0	2	0	1	0	0	1	1	0	6

Team	1	2	3	4	5	6	7	8	9	10	Final
Manitoba (Brownridge)	0	3	0	2	1	0	0	0	2	0	8
British Columbia (Dexter)	2	0	4	0	0	1	1	1	0	2	11

Team	1	2	3	4	5	6	7	8	9	10	11	Final
Saskatchewan (Mitchell)	0	0	1	0	0	1	1	0	1	0	1	5
Newfoundland (Bartlett)	1	0	0	1	0	0	0	1	0	1	0	4

Team	1	2	3	4	5	6	7	8	9	10	Final
Nova Scotia (Jones)	3	0	3	0	0	2	0	2	2	X	12
Quebec (Crowe)	0	2	0	2	1	0	2	0	0	X	7

== Tiebreakers ==
Friday, February 29, 2:00 pm

Team	1	2	3	4	5	6	7	8	9	10	Final
British Columbia (Dexter)	0	1	0	1	1	0	0	1	0	X	4
Saskatchewan (Mitchell)	3	0	2	0	0	0	1	0	1	X	7

Team	1	2	3	4	5	6	7	8	9	10	Final
Ontario (Bodogh)	1	3	0	3	0	0	0	0	0	X	7
Alberta (Davis)	0	0	1	0	1	1	0	1	1	X	5

== Playoffs ==
Semifinal			Final
			1	Nova Scotia	5
2	Ontario	7	3	Saskatchewan	6
3	Saskatchewan	8

=== Semifinal ===
Saturday, March 1, 8:15 am

Team	1	2	3	4	5	6	7	8	9	10	Final
Saskatchewan (Mitchell)	1	0	0	3	2	0	0	0	1	1	8
Ontario (Bodogh)	0	1	0	0	0	3	2	1	0	0	7

=== Final ===
Saturday, March 1, 12:45 pm

Team	1	2	3	4	5	6	7	8	9	10	Final
Nova Scotia (Jones)	0	0	0	1	0	3	0	0	1	X	5
Saskatchewan (Mitchell)	2	0	1	0	2	0	1	0	0	X	6
