= Wendy Leach =

Canadian curler

- Curler ♀

Team
- Curling club: Caledonian CC, Regina, SK

Curling career
- Member Association: Saskatchewan
- Hearts: 1: (1980)
- World Championship: 1 (1980)
Medal record
Curling
Representing Canada
World Championships
Gold medal – first place	1980 Perth
Representing Saskatchewan
Scott Tournament of Hearts
Gold medal – first place	1980 Edmonton

Wendy Leach is a Canadian curler from Regina, Saskatchewan.

She is a 1980 World women's champion and 1980 Scott Tournament of Hearts champion.

In 2000, she was inducted into Canadian Curling Hall of Fame together with all of the 1980 Marj Mitchell team.

On March 21, 1981 she was installed to Saskatchewan Sports Hall of Fame with all of the 1980 Marj Mitchell team.

== Teams ==
Season	Skip	Third	Second	Lead	Events
1978–79	Marj Mitchell	Kenda Richards	Nancy Kerr	Wendy Leach	
1979–80	Marj Mitchell	Nancy Kerr	Shirley McKendry	Wendy Leach	STOH 1980 (gold); WCC 1980 (gold)
1986–87	Nancy Kerr	Kenda Richards	Gertie Pick	Wendy Leach	
1994–95	Crystal Brunas	Wendy Leach	Barb Cressman	Dawn Obleman	
1996–97	Susan Lang	Kenda Richards	Wendy Leach	Kathie Haugen	
1997–98	Susan Lang	Kenda Richards	Wendy Leach	Diane Baumung	
2005–06	Crystal Frisk	Diane Baumung	Roberta Fonger	Wendy Leach	CSCC 2006 (11th)
2010–11	Nancy Kerr	Anita Ford	Dawn Obleman	Wendy Leach	
