= Nancy Kerr (curler) =

Canadian female curler

- Curler ♀
- Born: April 2, 1947 (age 79); Moose Jaw, Saskatchewan, Canada

Team
- Curling club: Caledonian Ladies CC, Regina, SK, Caledonian CC, Regina, SK

Curling career
- Member Association: Saskatchewan
- Hearts: 2: (1975, 1980)
- World Championship: 1 (1980)
Medal record
Curling
Representing Canada
World Championships
Gold medal – first place	1980 Perth
World Senior Championships
Gold medal – first place	2003 Winnipeg
Representing Saskatchewan
Scott Tournament of Hearts
Gold medal – first place	1980 Edmonton
Silver medal – second place	1975 Moncton

Nancy Kerr (born April 2, 1947, in Moose Jaw, Saskatchewan) is a Canadian curler.

She is a 1980 World women's champion and 1980 Scott Tournament of Hearts champion.

In 2000, she was inducted into Canadian Curling Hall of Fame together with all of the 1980 Marj Mitchell team.

On the March 21, 1981 she was installed to Saskatchewan Sports Hall of Fame with all of the 1980 Marj Mitchell team.

== Teams ==
Season	Skip	Third	Second	Lead	Events
1974–75	Marjorie Mitchell	Kenda Richards	Nancy Kerr	Florence Sanna	STOH 1975 (silver)
1978–79	Marj Mitchell	Kenda Richards	Nancy Kerr	Wendy Leach	
1979–80	Marj Mitchell	Nancy Kerr	Shirley McKendry	Wendy Leach	STOH 1980 (gold); WCC 1980 (gold)
1986–87	Nancy Kerr	Kendra Richards	Gertie Pick	Wendy Leach	
1997–98	Crystal Frisk	Nancy Kerr	Lorna Dopson	Gertie Pick	CSCC 1998 (5th)
1999–00	Nancy Kerr	Linda Burnham	Lorna Dopson	Gertie Pick	CSCC 2000 (silver)
2000–01	Nancy Kerr	Linda Burnham	Kenda Richards	Gertie Pick	CSCC 2001 (5th)
2001–02	Nancy Kerr	Linda Burnham	Kenda Richards	Gertie Pick	CSCC 2002 (bronze)
2002–03	Nancy Kerr	Linda Burnham	Kenda Richards	Gertie Pick	CSCC 2003 (gold); WSCC 2003 (gold)
2010–11	Nancy Kerr	Anita Ford	Dawn Obleman	Wendy Leach	
