= Joan Fish =

American curler

- Curler ♀
- Other names: Mary Fish

Team
- Curling club: Granite CC, Seattle, WA

Curling career
- Member Association: United States
- World Championship: 2 (1980, 1987)
- Other appearances: World Senior Championships: 1 (2009)
Medal record
Curling
United States Women's Championship
Gold medal – first place	1980 Seattle
Gold medal – first place	1987 St. Paul

Joan Fish (also known as Mary Fish) is an American curler from Seattle, Washington. She is a two-time women's national champion (1980, 1987) and former senior women's national champion (2009).

Fish and her teammates were not successful in their attempt to qualify for the 1998 Calgary Olympics.

In 2009 Fish competed in the world championships in New Zealand after winning the United States' Senior Women's Championship.

== Teams ==
Season	Skip	Third	Second	Lead	Events
1979–80	Sharon Kozai	Joan Fish	Betty Kozai	Aija Edwards	1980 USWCC (gold); 1980 WWCC (4th)
1986–87	Sharon Good	Joan Fish	Beth Bronger-Jones	Aija Edwards	1987 USWCC (gold); 1987 WWCC (5th)
2008–09	Sharon Vukich	Joan Fish	Cathie Tomlinson	Aija Edwards	2009 USSCC (gold); 2009 WSCC (6th)

== Personal life ==
Her sister-in-law Aija Edwards is also a curler, they are teammates on US and World women's and seniors championships.
