= 2003 Canadian Senior Curling Championships =

- Host city: Lethbridge, Alberta
- Arena: Lethbridge Curling Club
- Dates: January 18-26, 2003
- Men's winner: Alberta
- Skip: Tom Reed
- Third: Warren Kushnir
- Second: Larry Gardeski
- Lead: Garry Landry
- Finalist: Manitoba
- Women's winner: Saskatchewan
- Skip: Nancy Kerr
- Third: Linda Burnham
- Second: Kenda Richards
- Lead: Gertie Pick
- Finalist: British Columbia

The 2003 Canadian Senior Curling Championships were held January 18–26 at the Lethbridge Curling Club in Lethbridge, Alberta.

== Men's ==
=== Teams ===
| Province / Territory | Skip | Third | Second | Lead |
|---|---|---|---|---|
| British Columbia | Ken Watson | Dale Hockley | Russell Knutson | Gary Robilliard |
| Alberta | Tom Reed | Warren Kushnir | Larry Gardeski | Garry Landry |
| Saskatchewan | Wendell Charbonneau | Verne Anderson | Paul Tetreault | Dale Bobinski |
| Manitoba | Doug Armour | Martin Bailey | Don Barr | Ken Sabad |
| Northern Ontario | Gary Ball | Denis Magne | Terry Gilbart | Ken Cressman |
| Ontario | Don Glinz | John Brotherhood | Steve Tooze | Kent Cochrane |
| Quebec | Mike Carson | Roger Perron | Jean-Luc Fortier | Jacquelin Lemieux |
| New Brunswick | Mike Flannery | Bryan MacPherson | Chuck Kingston | Marty Mockler |
| Nova Scotia | Peter Corkum | Stu Cameron | Jim Steffens | David Conrad |
| Newfoundland and Labrador | Bas Buckle | Bob Freeman | Gerry Young | Harvey Holloway |
| Prince Edward Island | Charlie Wilkinson | Craig Mackie | Dave Murphy | Bill Atkinson |
| Northwest Territories/Yukon | Doug Bothamley | John Taylor | John Ondrack | Mick Beauchamp |

=== Standings ===
| Locale | Skip | W | L |
|---|---|---|---|
| Alberta | Tom Reed | 9 | 2 |
| Manitoba | Doug Armour | 8 | 3 |
| Saskatchewan | Wendell Charbonneau | 8 | 3 |
| Ontario | Don Glinz | 7 | 4 |
| Quebec | Mike Carson | 7 | 4 |
| Northern Ontario | Gary Ball | 6 | 5 |
| British Columbia | Ken Watson | 5 | 6 |
| New Brunswick | Bryan MacPherson | 5 | 6 |
| Newfoundland and Labrador | Bas Buckle | 4 | 7 |
| Prince Edward Island | Charlie Wilkinson | 4 | 7 |
| Nova Scotia | Peter Corkum | 2 | 9 |
| Northwest Territories/Yukon | Doug Bothamley | 1 | 10 |

=== Results ===
==== Draw 1 ====
| Sheet B | 1 | 2 | 3 | 4 | 5 | 6 | 7 | 8 | 9 | 10 | Final |
|---|---|---|---|---|---|---|---|---|---|---|---|
| Manitoba (Armour) 🔨 | 0 | 2 | 0 | 1 | 0 | 1 | 0 | 0 | 2 | X | 6 |
| Ontario (Glinz) | 2 | 0 | 2 | 0 | 1 | 0 | 2 | 2 | 0 | X | 9 |

| Sheet D | 1 | 2 | 3 | 4 | 5 | 6 | 7 | 8 | 9 | 10 | Final |
|---|---|---|---|---|---|---|---|---|---|---|---|
| British Columbia (Watson) | 0 | 0 | 0 | 0 | 1 | 0 | 0 | 1 | 0 | X | 2 |
| Alberta (Reed) 🔨 | 1 | 0 | 0 | 0 | 0 | 2 | 2 | 0 | 0 | X | 5 |

| Sheet F | 1 | 2 | 3 | 4 | 5 | 6 | 7 | 8 | 9 | 10 | Final |
|---|---|---|---|---|---|---|---|---|---|---|---|
| Newfoundland and Labrador (Buckle) | 1 | 1 | 0 | 0 | 1 | 0 | 3 | 1 | 0 | X | 7 |
| Prince Edward Island (Wilkinson) 🔨 | 0 | 0 | 0 | 1 | 0 | 1 | 0 | 0 | 2 | X | 4 |

| Sheet H | 1 | 2 | 3 | 4 | 5 | 6 | 7 | 8 | 9 | 10 | Final |
|---|---|---|---|---|---|---|---|---|---|---|---|
| Northwest Territories/Yukon (Bothamley) | 0 | 0 | 1 | 3 | 0 | 0 | 1 | 0 | 2 | X | 7 |
| Nova Scotia (Corkum) 🔨 | 0 | 0 | 0 | 0 | 3 | 0 | 0 | 0 | 0 | X | 3 |

==== Draw 2 ====
| Sheet A | 1 | 2 | 3 | 4 | 5 | 6 | 7 | 8 | 9 | 10 | Final |
|---|---|---|---|---|---|---|---|---|---|---|---|
| Prince Edward Island (Wilkinson) 🔨 | 1 | 0 | 1 | 1 | 1 | 1 | 0 | 0 | 1 | 2 | 8 |
| British Columbia (Watson) | 0 | 3 | 0 | 0 | 0 | 0 | 1 | 2 | 0 | 0 | 6 |

| Sheet C | 1 | 2 | 3 | 4 | 5 | 6 | 7 | 8 | 9 | 10 | Final |
|---|---|---|---|---|---|---|---|---|---|---|---|
| New Brunswick (Flannery) 🔨 | 0 | 1 | 0 | 0 | 3 | 0 | 0 | 2 | 1 | 0 | 7 |
| Northern Ontario (Ball) | 2 | 0 | 1 | 0 | 0 | 0 | 3 | 0 | 0 | 2 | 8 |

| Sheet E | 1 | 2 | 3 | 4 | 5 | 6 | 7 | 8 | 9 | 10 | Final |
|---|---|---|---|---|---|---|---|---|---|---|---|
| Quebec (Carson) | 0 | 2 | 0 | 1 | 0 | 0 | 0 | 1 | 1 | 2 | 7 |
| Saskatchewan (Charbonneau) 🔨 | 1 | 0 | 1 | 0 | 1 | 1 | 0 | 0 | 0 | 0 | 4 |

| Sheet G | 1 | 2 | 3 | 4 | 5 | 6 | 7 | 8 | 9 | 10 | Final |
|---|---|---|---|---|---|---|---|---|---|---|---|
| Newfoundland and Labrador (Buckle) 🔨 | 1 | 0 | 1 | 0 | 2 | 0 | 1 | 0 | 1 | 0 | 6 |
| Alberta (Reed) | 0 | 1 | 0 | 2 | 0 | 2 | 0 | 2 | 0 | 1 | 8 |

==== Draw 3 ====
| Sheet D | 1 | 2 | 3 | 4 | 5 | 6 | 7 | 8 | 9 | 10 | Final |
|---|---|---|---|---|---|---|---|---|---|---|---|
| Nova Scotia (Corkum) 🔨 | 0 | 1 | 0 | 2 | 0 | 0 | 0 | 0 | 2 | 0 | 5 |
| Manitoba (Armour) | 0 | 0 | 3 | 0 | 0 | 0 | 0 | 1 | 0 | 3 | 7 |

| Sheet F | 1 | 2 | 3 | 4 | 5 | 6 | 7 | 8 | 9 | 10 | Final |
|---|---|---|---|---|---|---|---|---|---|---|---|
| Northwest Territories/Yukon (Bothamley) 🔨 | 0 | 2 | 0 | 0 | 1 | 0 | 1 | 0 | 1 | X | 5 |
| Ontario (Glinz) | 0 | 0 | 2 | 1 | 0 | 3 | 0 | 2 | 0 | X | 8 |

==== Draw 4 ====
| Sheet B | 1 | 2 | 3 | 4 | 5 | 6 | 7 | 8 | 9 | 10 | Final |
|---|---|---|---|---|---|---|---|---|---|---|---|
| Northern Ontario (Ball) 🔨 | 1 | 0 | 0 | 0 | 2 | 0 | 1 | 0 | 0 | X | 4 |
| Quebec (Carson) | 0 | 3 | 0 | 1 | 0 | 1 | 0 | 3 | 2 | X | 10 |

| Sheet C | 1 | 2 | 3 | 4 | 5 | 6 | 7 | 8 | 9 | 10 | Final |
|---|---|---|---|---|---|---|---|---|---|---|---|
| Alberta (Reed) 🔨 | 2 | 0 | 0 | 1 | 0 | 1 | 0 | 0 | 0 | 1 | 5 |
| Prince Edward Island (Wilkinson) | 0 | 0 | 2 | 0 | 1 | 0 | 1 | 0 | 0 | 0 | 4 |

| Sheet E | 1 | 2 | 3 | 4 | 5 | 6 | 7 | 8 | 9 | 10 | Final |
|---|---|---|---|---|---|---|---|---|---|---|---|
| British Columbia (Watson) 🔨 | 4 | 0 | 0 | 3 | 0 | 1 | 3 | X | X | X | 11 |
| Newfoundland and Labrador (Buckle) | 0 | 0 | 1 | 0 | 2 | 0 | 0 | X | X | X | 3 |

| Sheet G | 1 | 2 | 3 | 4 | 5 | 6 | 7 | 8 | 9 | 10 | Final |
|---|---|---|---|---|---|---|---|---|---|---|---|
| New Brunswick (Flannery) 🔨 | 1 | 0 | 2 | 0 | 3 | 0 | 2 | 0 | 0 | 0 | 8 |
| Saskatchewan (Charbonneau) | 0 | 2 | 0 | 1 | 0 | 3 | 0 | 1 | 1 | 1 | 9 |

==== Draw 5 ====
| Sheet A | 1 | 2 | 3 | 4 | 5 | 6 | 7 | 8 | 9 | 10 | Final |
|---|---|---|---|---|---|---|---|---|---|---|---|
| Ontario (Glinz) 🔨 | 3 | 0 | 0 | 1 | 0 | 1 | 2 | 0 | X | X | 7 |
| Nova Scotia (Corkum) | 0 | 2 | 0 | 0 | 1 | 0 | 0 | 1 | X | X | 4 |

| Sheet D | 1 | 2 | 3 | 4 | 5 | 6 | 7 | 8 | 9 | 10 | Final |
|---|---|---|---|---|---|---|---|---|---|---|---|
| Quebec (Carson) 🔨 | 0 | 1 | 0 | 0 | 0 | 0 | 1 | 0 | 1 | X | 3 |
| New Brunswick (Flannery) | 0 | 0 | 0 | 3 | 0 | 1 | 0 | 1 | 0 | X | 5 |

| Sheet F | 1 | 2 | 3 | 4 | 5 | 6 | 7 | 8 | 9 | 10 | Final |
|---|---|---|---|---|---|---|---|---|---|---|---|
| Saskatchewan (Charbonneau) 🔨 | 1 | 1 | 0 | 2 | 1 | 0 | 0 | 1 | 0 | 0 | 6 |
| Northern Ontario (Ball) | 0 | 0 | 1 | 0 | 0 | 3 | 1 | 0 | 1 | 1 | 7 |

| Sheet G | 1 | 2 | 3 | 4 | 5 | 6 | 7 | 8 | 9 | 10 | Final |
|---|---|---|---|---|---|---|---|---|---|---|---|
| Manitoba (Armour) 🔨 | 1 | 0 | 2 | 0 | 1 | 1 | 1 | 2 | 1 | X | 9 |
| Northwest Territories/Yukon (Bothamley) | 0 | 2 | 0 | 2 | 0 | 0 | 0 | 0 | 0 | X | 4 |

==== Draw 6 ====
| Sheet B | 1 | 2 | 3 | 4 | 5 | 6 | 7 | 8 | 9 | 10 | Final |
|---|---|---|---|---|---|---|---|---|---|---|---|
| Northwest Territories/Yukon (Bothamley) 🔨 | 1 | 0 | 0 | 1 | 1 | 0 | 1 | 0 | 1 | 0 | 5 |
| Newfoundland and Labrador (Buckle) | 0 | 0 | 1 | 0 | 0 | 2 | 0 | 1 | 0 | 2 | 6 |

| Sheet C | 1 | 2 | 3 | 4 | 5 | 6 | 7 | 8 | 9 | 10 | Final |
|---|---|---|---|---|---|---|---|---|---|---|---|
| Nova Scotia (Corkum) 🔨 | 0 | 1 | 0 | 0 | 0 | 1 | 0 | 0 | X | X | 2 |
| British Columbia (Watson) | 0 | 0 | 3 | 0 | 2 | 0 | 0 | 3 | X | X | 8 |

| Sheet E | 1 | 2 | 3 | 4 | 5 | 6 | 7 | 8 | 9 | 10 | Final |
|---|---|---|---|---|---|---|---|---|---|---|---|
| Manitoba (Armour) 🔨 | 0 | 1 | 1 | 1 | 0 | 2 | 0 | 1 | 0 | X | 6 |
| Prince Edward Island (Wilkinson) | 1 | 0 | 0 | 0 | 1 | 0 | 1 | 0 | 1 | X | 4 |

| Sheet H | 1 | 2 | 3 | 4 | 5 | 6 | 7 | 8 | 9 | 10 | Final |
|---|---|---|---|---|---|---|---|---|---|---|---|
| Ontario (Glinz) 🔨 | 1 | 0 | 1 | 0 | 0 | 1 | 0 | 0 | 2 | 0 | 5 |
| Alberta (Reed) | 0 | 1 | 0 | 2 | 1 | 0 | 0 | 1 | 0 | 1 | 6 |

==== Draw 7 ====
| Sheet B | 1 | 2 | 3 | 4 | 5 | 6 | 7 | 8 | 9 | 10 | Final |
|---|---|---|---|---|---|---|---|---|---|---|---|
| British Columbia (Watson) 🔨 | 0 | 0 | 1 | 0 | 0 | 0 | 1 | 0 | 0 | X | 2 |
| Saskatchewan (Charbonneau) | 0 | 1 | 0 | 0 | 0 | 1 | 0 | 2 | 1 | X | 5 |

| Sheet D | 1 | 2 | 3 | 4 | 5 | 6 | 7 | 8 | 9 | 10 | Final |
|---|---|---|---|---|---|---|---|---|---|---|---|
| Newfoundland and Labrador (Buckle) 🔨 | 1 | 0 | 1 | 0 | 1 | 0 | X | X | X | X | 3 |
| Northern Ontario (Ball) | 0 | 5 | 0 | 3 | 0 | 1 | X | X | X | X | 9 |

| Sheet F | 1 | 2 | 3 | 4 | 5 | 6 | 7 | 8 | 9 | 10 | 11 | Final |
|---|---|---|---|---|---|---|---|---|---|---|---|---|
| Alberta (Reed) 🔨 | 0 | 2 | 0 | 0 | 1 | 0 | 0 | 0 | 1 | 0 | 0 | 4 |
| Quebec (Carson) | 0 | 0 | 0 | 1 | 0 | 0 | 2 | 0 | 0 | 1 | 1 | 5 |

| Sheet H | 1 | 2 | 3 | 4 | 5 | 6 | 7 | 8 | 9 | 10 | Final |
|---|---|---|---|---|---|---|---|---|---|---|---|
| Prince Edward Island (Wilkinson) 🔨 | 0 | 0 | 0 | 1 | 0 | 0 | X | X | X | X | 1 |
| New Brunswick (Flannery) | 0 | 1 | 4 | 0 | 2 | 1 | X | X | X | X | 8 |

==== Draw 8 ====
| Sheet A | 1 | 2 | 3 | 4 | 5 | 6 | 7 | 8 | 9 | 10 | Final |
|---|---|---|---|---|---|---|---|---|---|---|---|
| New Brunswick (Flannery) 🔨 | 0 | 1 | 0 | 1 | 0 | 0 | 1 | 0 | 2 | 0 | 5 |
| Manitoba (Armour) | 0 | 0 | 3 | 0 | 0 | 1 | 0 | 2 | 0 | 2 | 8 |

| Sheet C | 1 | 2 | 3 | 4 | 5 | 6 | 7 | 8 | 9 | 10 | 11 | Final |
|---|---|---|---|---|---|---|---|---|---|---|---|---|
| Quebec (Carson) 🔨 | 0 | 2 | 0 | 1 | 0 | 1 | 0 | 0 | 1 | 1 | 0 | 6 |
| Ontario (Glinz) | 1 | 0 | 2 | 0 | 0 | 0 | 3 | 0 | 0 | 0 | 1 | 7 |

| Sheet E | 1 | 2 | 3 | 4 | 5 | 6 | 7 | 8 | 9 | 10 | Final |
|---|---|---|---|---|---|---|---|---|---|---|---|
| Northern Ontario (Ball) 🔨 | 0 | 3 | 1 | 0 | 3 | 0 | 0 | 1 | 3 | X | 11 |
| Northwest Territories/Yukon (Bothamley) | 0 | 0 | 0 | 1 | 0 | 3 | 2 | 0 | 0 | X | 6 |

| Sheet G | 1 | 2 | 3 | 4 | 5 | 6 | 7 | 8 | 9 | 10 | Final |
|---|---|---|---|---|---|---|---|---|---|---|---|
| Saskatchewan (Charbonneau) 🔨 | 3 | 0 | 2 | 1 | 1 | 0 | 0 | 2 | X | X | 9 |
| Nova Scotia (Corkum) | 0 | 2 | 0 | 0 | 0 | 1 | 1 | 0 | X | X | 4 |

==== Draw 9 ====
| Sheet A | 1 | 2 | 3 | 4 | 5 | 6 | 7 | 8 | 9 | 10 | Final |
|---|---|---|---|---|---|---|---|---|---|---|---|
| Northern Ontario (Ball) 🔨 | 1 | 1 | 2 | 1 | 2 | 0 | 3 | X | X | X | 10 |
| Ontario (Glinz) | 0 | 0 | 0 | 0 | 0 | 1 | 0 | X | X | X | 1 |

| Sheet C | 1 | 2 | 3 | 4 | 5 | 6 | 7 | 8 | 9 | 10 | Final |
|---|---|---|---|---|---|---|---|---|---|---|---|
| Saskatchewan (Charbonneau) 🔨 | 1 | 1 | 0 | 1 | 0 | 1 | 1 | 0 | 1 | 0 | 6 |
| Manitoba (Armour) | 0 | 0 | 2 | 0 | 2 | 0 | 0 | 3 | 0 | 1 | 8 |

| Sheet E | 1 | 2 | 3 | 4 | 5 | 6 | 7 | 8 | 9 | 10 | Final |
|---|---|---|---|---|---|---|---|---|---|---|---|
| New Brunswick (Flannery) 🔨 | 0 | 3 | 0 | 1 | 0 | 1 | 1 | 1 | 0 | 0 | 7 |
| Nova Scotia (Corkum) | 0 | 0 | 1 | 0 | 3 | 0 | 0 | 0 | 2 | 0 | 6 |

| Sheet H | 1 | 2 | 3 | 4 | 5 | 6 | 7 | 8 | 9 | 10 | Final |
|---|---|---|---|---|---|---|---|---|---|---|---|
| Quebec (Carson) 🔨 | 2 | 0 | 1 | 0 | 2 | 1 | 0 | 3 | 0 | X | 9 |
| Northwest Territories/Yukon (Bothamley) | 0 | 3 | 0 | 1 | 0 | 0 | 1 | 0 | 2 | X | 7 |

==== Draw 10 ====
| Sheet B | 1 | 2 | 3 | 4 | 5 | 6 | 7 | 8 | 9 | 10 | Final |
|---|---|---|---|---|---|---|---|---|---|---|---|
| Nova Scotia (Corkum) 🔨 | 1 | 0 | 0 | 0 | 1 | 0 | 0 | 2 | 0 | X | 4 |
| Alberta (Reed) | 0 | 2 | 2 | 2 | 0 | 0 | 1 | 0 | 2 | X | 9 |

| Sheet D | 1 | 2 | 3 | 4 | 5 | 6 | 7 | 8 | 9 | 10 | 11 | Final |
|---|---|---|---|---|---|---|---|---|---|---|---|---|
| Northwest Territories/Yukon (Bothamley) 🔨 | 1 | 0 | 1 | 1 | 0 | 0 | 0 | 1 | 0 | 1 | 0 | 5 |
| Prince Edward Island (Wilkinson) | 0 | 1 | 0 | 0 | 0 | 0 | 2 | 0 | 2 | 0 | 2 | 7 |

| Sheet F | 1 | 2 | 3 | 4 | 5 | 6 | 7 | 8 | 9 | 10 | Final |
|---|---|---|---|---|---|---|---|---|---|---|---|
| Ontario (Glinz) 🔨 | 3 | 0 | 1 | 0 | 3 | 0 | 0 | 4 | X | X | 11 |
| British Columbia (Watson) | 0 | 1 | 0 | 1 | 0 | 2 | 1 | 0 | X | X | 5 |

| Sheet H | 1 | 2 | 3 | 4 | 5 | 6 | 7 | 8 | 9 | 10 | Final |
|---|---|---|---|---|---|---|---|---|---|---|---|
| Manitoba (Armour) 🔨 | 0 | 1 | 0 | 1 | 1 | 0 | 2 | 1 | 0 | 0 | 6 |
| Newfoundland and Labrador (Buckle) | 1 | 0 | 2 | 0 | 0 | 1 | 0 | 0 | 1 | 0 | 5 |

==== Draw 11 ====
| Sheet A | 1 | 2 | 3 | 4 | 5 | 6 | 7 | 8 | 9 | 10 | Final |
|---|---|---|---|---|---|---|---|---|---|---|---|
| Prince Edward Island (Wilkinson) 🔨 | 2 | 0 | 0 | 0 | 1 | 0 | 1 | 1 | 0 | 2 | 7 |
| Quebec (Carson) | 0 | 1 | 1 | 1 | 0 | 2 | 0 | 0 | 0 | 0 | 5 |

| Sheet D | 1 | 2 | 3 | 4 | 5 | 6 | 7 | 8 | 9 | 10 | Final |
|---|---|---|---|---|---|---|---|---|---|---|---|
| Alberta (Reed) 🔨 | 1 | 1 | 0 | 0 | 1 | 0 | 0 | 1 | 0 | 2 | 6 |
| New Brunswick (Flannery) | 0 | 0 | 1 | 0 | 0 | 0 | 1 | 0 | 2 | 0 | 4 |

| Sheet F | 1 | 2 | 3 | 4 | 5 | 6 | 7 | 8 | 9 | 10 | Final |
|---|---|---|---|---|---|---|---|---|---|---|---|
| Newfoundland and Labrador (Buckle) 🔨 | 1 | 0 | 1 | 0 | 1 | 0 | 0 | 0 | 1 | 0 | 4 |
| Saskatchewan (Charbonneau) | 0 | 1 | 0 | 1 | 0 | 2 | 0 | 1 | 0 | 1 | 6 |

| Sheet G | 1 | 2 | 3 | 4 | 5 | 6 | 7 | 8 | 9 | 10 | Final |
|---|---|---|---|---|---|---|---|---|---|---|---|
| British Columbia (Watson) 🔨 | 1 | 0 | 0 | 0 | 0 | 1 | 0 | 2 | 1 | X | 5 |
| Northern Ontario (Ball) | 0 | 0 | 1 | 1 | 0 | 0 | 1 | 0 | 0 | X | 3 |

==== Draw 12 ====
| Sheet B | 1 | 2 | 3 | 4 | 5 | 6 | 7 | 8 | 9 | 10 | Final |
|---|---|---|---|---|---|---|---|---|---|---|---|
| Newfoundland and Labrador (Buckle) 🔨 | 2 | 0 | 0 | 2 | 1 | 0 | 1 | 1 | 0 | 1 | 8 |
| New Brunswick (Flannery) | 0 | 1 | 0 | 0 | 0 | 1 | 0 | 0 | 2 | 0 | 4 |

| Sheet D | 1 | 2 | 3 | 4 | 5 | 6 | 7 | 8 | 9 | 10 | Final |
|---|---|---|---|---|---|---|---|---|---|---|---|
| British Columbia (Watson) 🔨 | 2 | 0 | 0 | 0 | 1 | 0 | 1 | 0 | 1 | 0 | 5 |
| Quebec (Carson) | 0 | 0 | 2 | 1 | 0 | 1 | 0 | 1 | 0 | 2 | 7 |

| Sheet F | 1 | 2 | 3 | 4 | 5 | 6 | 7 | 8 | 9 | 10 | Final |
|---|---|---|---|---|---|---|---|---|---|---|---|
| Prince Edward Island (Wilkinson) 🔨 | 1 | 0 | 2 | 3 | 0 | 0 | 1 | 3 | X | X | 10 |
| Northern Ontario (Ball) | 0 | 2 | 0 | 0 | 2 | 1 | 0 | 0 | X | X | 5 |

| Sheet H | 1 | 2 | 3 | 4 | 5 | 6 | 7 | 8 | 9 | 10 | Final |
|---|---|---|---|---|---|---|---|---|---|---|---|
| Alberta (Reed) 🔨 | 1 | 0 | 0 | 2 | 0 | 1 | 0 | 0 | 0 | 0 | 4 |
| Saskatchewan (Charbonneau) | 0 | 1 | 1 | 0 | 1 | 0 | 0 | 0 | 1 | 1 | 5 |

==== Draw 13 ====
| Sheet A | 1 | 2 | 3 | 4 | 5 | 6 | 7 | 8 | 9 | 10 | Final |
|---|---|---|---|---|---|---|---|---|---|---|---|
| Saskatchewan (Charbonneau) 🔨 | 0 | 3 | 0 | 2 | 1 | 1 | 1 | X | X | X | 8 |
| Northwest Territories/Yukon (Bothamley) | 0 | 0 | 1 | 0 | 0 | 0 | 0 | X | X | X | 1 |

| Sheet C | 1 | 2 | 3 | 4 | 5 | 6 | 7 | 8 | 9 | 10 | Final |
|---|---|---|---|---|---|---|---|---|---|---|---|
| Northern Ontario (Ball) 🔨 | 2 | 1 | 0 | 1 | 1 | 1 | 0 | 1 | 0 | X | 7 |
| Nova Scotia (Corkum) | 0 | 0 | 1 | 0 | 0 | 0 | 2 | 0 | 2 | X | 5 |

| Sheet F | 1 | 2 | 3 | 4 | 5 | 6 | 7 | 8 | 9 | 10 | Final |
|---|---|---|---|---|---|---|---|---|---|---|---|
| Quebec (Carson) 🔨 | 0 | 4 | 0 | 0 | 3 | 0 | 2 | 0 | 1 | X | 10 |
| Manitoba (Armour) | 0 | 0 | 1 | 1 | 0 | 2 | 0 | 1 | 0 | X | 5 |

| Sheet H | 1 | 2 | 3 | 4 | 5 | 6 | 7 | 8 | 9 | 10 | Final |
|---|---|---|---|---|---|---|---|---|---|---|---|
| New Brunswick (Flannery) 🔨 | 2 | 4 | 0 | 1 | 0 | 0 | 2 | 0 | 1 | X | 10 |
| Ontario (Glinz) | 0 | 0 | 1 | 0 | 2 | 0 | 0 | 1 | 0 | X | 4 |

==== Draw 14 ====
| Sheet B | 1 | 2 | 3 | 4 | 5 | 6 | 7 | 8 | 9 | 10 | Final |
|---|---|---|---|---|---|---|---|---|---|---|---|
| Manitoba (Armour) 🔨 | 1 | 1 | 0 | 0 | 2 | 0 | 0 | 0 | 1 | X | 5 |
| British Columbia (Watson) | 0 | 0 | 0 | 1 | 0 | 1 | 0 | 1 | 0 | X | 3 |

| Sheet D | 1 | 2 | 3 | 4 | 5 | 6 | 7 | 8 | 9 | 10 | Final |
|---|---|---|---|---|---|---|---|---|---|---|---|
| Ontario (Glinz) 🔨 | 0 | 1 | 0 | 1 | 0 | 2 | 0 | 2 | 0 | 1 | 7 |
| Newfoundland and Labrador (Buckle) | 0 | 0 | 1 | 0 | 1 | 0 | 2 | 0 | 2 | 0 | 6 |

| Sheet E | 1 | 2 | 3 | 4 | 5 | 6 | 7 | 8 | 9 | 10 | Final |
|---|---|---|---|---|---|---|---|---|---|---|---|
| Northwest Territories/Yukon (Bothamley) 🔨 | 1 | 0 | 0 | 1 | 0 | 0 | 1 | X | X | X | 3 |
| Alberta (Reed) | 0 | 1 | 3 | 0 | 2 | 1 | 0 | X | X | X | 7 |

| Sheet H | 1 | 2 | 3 | 4 | 5 | 6 | 7 | 8 | 9 | 10 | Final |
|---|---|---|---|---|---|---|---|---|---|---|---|
| Nova Scotia (Corkum) 🔨 | 1 | 1 | 0 | 2 | 0 | 1 | 0 | 2 | 0 | X | 7 |
| Prince Edward Island (Wilkinson) | 0 | 0 | 0 | 0 | 2 | 0 | 1 | 0 | 1 | X | 4 |

==== Draw 15 ====
| Sheet B | 1 | 2 | 3 | 4 | 5 | 6 | 7 | 8 | 9 | 10 | Final |
|---|---|---|---|---|---|---|---|---|---|---|---|
| Alberta (Reed) 🔨 | 0 | 2 | 0 | 3 | 1 | 0 | 3 | X | X | X | 9 |
| Northern Ontario (Ball) | 0 | 0 | 1 | 0 | 0 | 1 | 0 | X | X | X | 3 |

| Sheet D | 1 | 2 | 3 | 4 | 5 | 6 | 7 | 8 | 9 | 10 | Final |
|---|---|---|---|---|---|---|---|---|---|---|---|
| Prince Edward Island (Wilkinson) 🔨 | 1 | 0 | 1 | 0 | 2 | 0 | 2 | 1 | 0 | 0 | 7 |
| Saskatchewan (Charbonneau) | 0 | 2 | 0 | 1 | 0 | 1 | 0 | 0 | 3 | 1 | 8 |

| Sheet F | 1 | 2 | 3 | 4 | 5 | 6 | 7 | 8 | 9 | 10 | Final |
|---|---|---|---|---|---|---|---|---|---|---|---|
| British Columbia (Watson) 🔨 | 2 | 2 | 0 | 2 | 0 | 1 | 0 | 1 | 0 | 1 | 9 |
| New Brunswick (Flannery) | 0 | 0 | 2 | 0 | 1 | 0 | 1 | 0 | 2 | 0 | 6 |

| Sheet G | 1 | 2 | 3 | 4 | 5 | 6 | 7 | 8 | 9 | 10 | Final |
|---|---|---|---|---|---|---|---|---|---|---|---|
| Newfoundland and Labrador (Buckle) 🔨 | 0 | 1 | 0 | 1 | 0 | 2 | 1 | 0 | 2 | X | 7 |
| Quebec (Carson) | 0 | 0 | 2 | 0 | 2 | 0 | 0 | 1 | 0 | X | 5 |

==== Draw 16 ====
| Sheet B | 1 | 2 | 3 | 4 | 5 | 6 | 7 | 8 | 9 | 10 | Final |
|---|---|---|---|---|---|---|---|---|---|---|---|
| Ontario (Glinz) 🔨 | 1 | 2 | 1 | 5 | 0 | 2 | X | X | X | X | 11 |
| Prince Edward Island (Wilkinson) | 0 | 0 | 0 | 0 | 1 | 0 | X | X | X | X | 1 |

| Sheet C | 1 | 2 | 3 | 4 | 5 | 6 | 7 | 8 | 9 | 10 | Final |
|---|---|---|---|---|---|---|---|---|---|---|---|
| Manitoba (Armour) 🔨 | 2 | 0 | 0 | 2 | 0 | 1 | 0 | 0 | 0 | X | 5 |
| Alberta (Reed) | 0 | 2 | 0 | 0 | 4 | 0 | 0 | 2 | 0 | X | 8 |

| Sheet E | 1 | 2 | 3 | 4 | 5 | 6 | 7 | 8 | 9 | 10 | Final |
|---|---|---|---|---|---|---|---|---|---|---|---|
| Nova Scotia (Corkum) 🔨 | 2 | 0 | 2 | 0 | 1 | 0 | 0 | 1 | 0 | 1 | 7 |
| Newfoundland and Labrador (Buckle) | 0 | 2 | 0 | 2 | 0 | 0 | 0 | 0 | 2 | 0 | 6 |

| Sheet G | 1 | 2 | 3 | 4 | 5 | 6 | 7 | 8 | 9 | 10 | Final |
|---|---|---|---|---|---|---|---|---|---|---|---|
| Northwest Territories/Yukon (Bothamley) 🔨 | 0 | 1 | 0 | 2 | 0 | 0 | 0 | 1 | 0 | 0 | 4 |
| British Columbia (Watson) | 0 | 0 | 1 | 0 | 3 | 1 | 0 | 0 | 0 | 0 | 5 |

==== Draw 17 ====
| Sheet B | 1 | 2 | 3 | 4 | 5 | 6 | 7 | 8 | 9 | 10 | Final |
|---|---|---|---|---|---|---|---|---|---|---|---|
| Quebec (Carson) 🔨 | 1 | 1 | 0 | 1 | 0 | 2 | 0 | 0 | 3 | X | 8 |
| Nova Scotia (Corkum) | 0 | 0 | 1 | 0 | 2 | 0 | 0 | 1 | 0 | X | 4 |

| Sheet C | 1 | 2 | 3 | 4 | 5 | 6 | 7 | 8 | 9 | 10 | Final |
|---|---|---|---|---|---|---|---|---|---|---|---|
| New Brunswick (Flannery) 🔨 | 3 | 1 | 0 | 1 | 0 | 1 | 1 | 0 | X | X | 7 |
| Northwest Territories/Yukon (Bothamley) | 0 | 0 | 1 | 0 | 1 | 0 | 0 | 1 | X | X | 3 |

| Sheet E | 1 | 2 | 3 | 4 | 5 | 6 | 7 | 8 | 9 | 10 | 11 | Final |
|---|---|---|---|---|---|---|---|---|---|---|---|---|
| Saskatchewan (Charbonneau) 🔨 | 0 | 0 | 3 | 0 | 2 | 1 | 0 | 1 | 0 | 0 | 1 | 8 |
| Ontario (Glinz) | 0 | 1 | 0 | 1 | 0 | 0 | 3 | 0 | 1 | 1 | 0 | 7 |

| Sheet H | 1 | 2 | 3 | 4 | 5 | 6 | 7 | 8 | 9 | 10 | Final |
|---|---|---|---|---|---|---|---|---|---|---|---|
| Northern Ontario (Ball) 🔨 | 0 | 0 | 0 | 2 | 0 | 1 | 0 | X | X | X | 3 |
| Manitoba (Armour) | 0 | 3 | 1 | 0 | 1 | 0 | 3 | X | X | X | 8 |

=== Playoffs ===
| Semifinal | | Final |
| Manitoba | 11 |
| Saskatchewan | 4 | Alberta | 6 |
| | | Manitoba | 2 |

==== Semifinal ====
| Sheet A | 1 | 2 | 3 | 4 | 5 | 6 | 7 | 8 | 9 | 10 | Final |
|---|---|---|---|---|---|---|---|---|---|---|---|
| Manitoba (Armour) 🔨 | 0 | 2 | 2 | 0 | 2 | 0 | 2 | 0 | 3 | X | 11 |
| Saskatchewan (Charbonneau) | 0 | 0 | 0 | 2 | 0 | 1 | 0 | 1 | 0 | X | 4 |

Player percentages
| Manitoba | | Saskatchewan | |
|---|---|---|---|
| Ken Sabad | 83% | Dale Bobinski | 82% |
| Don Barr | 74% | Paul Tetreault | 79% |
| Martin Bailey | 83% | Verne Anderson | 67% |
| Doug Armour | 94% | Wendell Charbonneau | 75% |
| Total | 84% | Total | 76% |

==== Final ====
| Sheet A | 1 | 2 | 3 | 4 | 5 | 6 | 7 | 8 | 9 | 10 | Final |
|---|---|---|---|---|---|---|---|---|---|---|---|
| Alberta (Reed) 🔨 | 1 | 1 | 0 | 0 | 0 | 0 | 0 | 3 | 1 | X | 6 |
| Manitoba (Armour) | 0 | 0 | 0 | 1 | 1 | 0 | 0 | 0 | 0 | X | 2 |

Player percentages
| Alberta | | Manitoba | |
|---|---|---|---|
| Garry Landry | 93% | Ken Sabad | 88% |
| Larry Gardeski | 84% | Don Barr | 74% |
| Warren Kushnir | 91% | Martin Bailey | 87% |
| Tom Reed | 72% | Doug Armour | 71% |
| Total | 85% | Total | 80% |

== Women's ==
=== Teams ===
| Province / Territory | Skip | Third | Second | Lead |
|---|---|---|---|---|
| British Columbia | Karen Lepine | Betty Johnston | Lyn Watson | Diane Hill |
| Alberta | Kathy Odegard | Dot Field | Dolene Fesyk | Faye Smith |
| Saskatchewan | Nancy Kerr | Linda Burnham | Kenda Richards | Gertie Pick |
| Manitoba | Elaine Jones | Carol Dunstone | Ruth Wiebe | Janice Haugen |
| Northern Ontario | Eila Brown | Arline Wilson | Judy Gerry | Liz Babe |
| Ontario | Joyce Potter | Muriel Potter | Janelle Sadler | Faye Linseman |
| Quebec | Agnes Charette | Diane Harris | Lois Baines | Mary Anne Robertson |
| New Brunswick | Karen McDermott | Shirley Crawford | Betty Peppard | Carol Spidell |
| Nova Scotia | Yvonne Martin | Carol Hampsey | Sandra Walker | Allison Weagle |
| Newfoundland and Labrador | Thelma Stockley | Norma Watton | Carmel Warford | Maxine Young |
| Prince Edward Island | Paula Creamer | Kay Atkinson | Debi Richard | Joan Saulnier |
| Northwest Territories/Yukon | Davida Delorey | Linda Carter | Rose Goudreau | Kathy Ryde |

=== Standings ===
| Locale | Skip | W | L |
|---|---|---|---|
| British Columbia | Karen Lepine | 9 | 2 |
| Ontario | Joyce Potter | 9 | 2 |
| Saskatchewan | Nancy Kerr | 9 | 2 |
| Quebec | Agnes Charette | 8 | 3 |
| Alberta | Kathy Odegard | 6 | 5 |
| Manitoba | Elaine Jones | 6 | 5 |
| New Brunswick | Karen McDermott | 5 | 6 |
| Prince Edward Island | Paula Creamer | 4 | 7 |
| Newfoundland and Labrador | Thelma Stockley | 4 | 7 |
| Nova Scotia | Yvonne Martin | 3 | 8 |
| Northern Ontario | Eila Brown | 3 | 8 |
| Northwest Territories/Yukon | Davida Delorey | 0 | 11 |

=== Results ===
==== Draw 1 ====
| Sheet A | 1 | 2 | 3 | 4 | 5 | 6 | 7 | 8 | 9 | 10 | Final |
|---|---|---|---|---|---|---|---|---|---|---|---|
| Manitoba (Jones) | 0 | 2 | 0 | 0 | 0 | 1 | 1 | 0 | 3 | X | 7 |
| Ontario (Potter) 🔨 | 2 | 0 | 3 | 1 | 1 | 0 | 0 | 2 | 0 | X | 9 |

| Sheet C | 1 | 2 | 3 | 4 | 5 | 6 | 7 | 8 | 9 | 10 | Final |
|---|---|---|---|---|---|---|---|---|---|---|---|
| British Columbia (Lepine) 🔨 | 0 | 0 | 0 | 2 | 0 | 2 | 0 | 1 | 0 | 1 | 6 |
| Alberta (Odegard) | 0 | 0 | 0 | 0 | 1 | 0 | 2 | 0 | 1 | 0 | 4 |

| Sheet E | 1 | 2 | 3 | 4 | 5 | 6 | 7 | 8 | 9 | 10 | Final |
|---|---|---|---|---|---|---|---|---|---|---|---|
| Newfoundland and Labrador (Stockley) 🔨 | 0 | 1 | 0 | 1 | 0 | 0 | 1 | 1 | 0 | 2 | 6 |
| Prince Edward Island (Creamer) | 1 | 0 | 3 | 0 | 0 | 4 | 0 | 0 | 0 | 0 | 8 |

| Sheet G | 1 | 2 | 3 | 4 | 5 | 6 | 7 | 8 | 9 | 10 | Final |
|---|---|---|---|---|---|---|---|---|---|---|---|
| Northwest Territories/Yukon (Delorey) 🔨 | 0 | 2 | 0 | 0 | 0 | 1 | 0 | 2 | 0 | X | 5 |
| Nova Scotia (Martin) | 1 | 0 | 0 | 3 | 1 | 0 | 3 | 0 | 3 | X | 11 |

==== Draw 2 ====
| Sheet B | 1 | 2 | 3 | 4 | 5 | 6 | 7 | 8 | 9 | 10 | Final |
|---|---|---|---|---|---|---|---|---|---|---|---|
| Prince Edward Island (Creamer) 🔨 | 1 | 0 | 0 | 1 | 0 | 1 | 0 | 0 | 0 | X | 3 |
| British Columbia (Lepine) | 0 | 1 | 1 | 0 | 1 | 0 | 1 | 2 | 3 | X | 9 |

| Sheet D | 1 | 2 | 3 | 4 | 5 | 6 | 7 | 8 | 9 | 10 | Final |
|---|---|---|---|---|---|---|---|---|---|---|---|
| New Brunswick (McDermott) 🔨 | 0 | 1 | 0 | 0 | 1 | 1 | 0 | 1 | 0 | X | 4 |
| Northern Ontario (Brown) | 2 | 0 | 1 | 1 | 0 | 0 | 1 | 0 | 4 | X | 9 |

| Sheet F | 1 | 2 | 3 | 4 | 5 | 6 | 7 | 8 | 9 | 10 | Final |
|---|---|---|---|---|---|---|---|---|---|---|---|
| Quebec (Charette) 🔨 | 2 | 0 | 3 | 1 | 0 | 2 | 3 | 0 | X | X | 11 |
| Saskatchewan (Kerr) | 0 | 1 | 0 | 0 | 2 | 0 | 0 | 1 | X | X | 4 |

| Sheet H | 1 | 2 | 3 | 4 | 5 | 6 | 7 | 8 | 9 | 10 | Final |
|---|---|---|---|---|---|---|---|---|---|---|---|
| Newfoundland and Labrador (Stockley) 🔨 | 0 | 1 | 2 | 2 | 0 | 0 | 2 | 0 | 1 | X | 8 |
| Alberta (Odegard) | 1 | 0 | 0 | 0 | 1 | 3 | 0 | 4 | 0 | X | 9 |

==== Draw 3 ====
| Sheet C | 1 | 2 | 3 | 4 | 5 | 6 | 7 | 8 | 9 | 10 | Final |
|---|---|---|---|---|---|---|---|---|---|---|---|
| Nova Scotia (Martin) 🔨 | 1 | 0 | 0 | 0 | 1 | 0 | 1 | 0 | 1 | 0 | 4 |
| Manitoba (Jones) | 0 | 1 | 0 | 3 | 0 | 0 | 0 | 2 | 0 | 0 | 6 |

| Sheet E | 1 | 2 | 3 | 4 | 5 | 6 | 7 | 8 | 9 | 10 | Final |
|---|---|---|---|---|---|---|---|---|---|---|---|
| Northwest Territories/Yukon (Delorey) 🔨 | 0 | 0 | 0 | 0 | 0 | 1 | 0 | 0 | X | X | 1 |
| Ontario (Potter) | 1 | 1 | 2 | 1 | 5 | 0 | 2 | 3 | X | X | 15 |

==== Draw 4 ====
| Sheet A | 1 | 2 | 3 | 4 | 5 | 6 | 7 | 8 | 9 | 10 | 11 | Final |
|---|---|---|---|---|---|---|---|---|---|---|---|---|
| Northern Ontario (Brown) 🔨 | 0 | 2 | 0 | 2 | 0 | 0 | 0 | 2 | 0 | 2 | 0 | 8 |
| Quebec (Charette) | 0 | 0 | 3 | 0 | 1 | 2 | 1 | 0 | 1 | 0 | 1 | 9 |

| Sheet D | 1 | 2 | 3 | 4 | 5 | 6 | 7 | 8 | 9 | 10 | Final |
|---|---|---|---|---|---|---|---|---|---|---|---|
| Alberta (Odegard) 🔨 | 0 | 1 | 0 | 1 | 1 | 1 | 2 | 1 | X | X | 7 |
| Prince Edward Island (Creamer) | 1 | 0 | 0 | 0 | 0 | 0 | 0 | 0 | X | X | 1 |

| Sheet F | 1 | 2 | 3 | 4 | 5 | 6 | 7 | 8 | 9 | 10 | Final |
|---|---|---|---|---|---|---|---|---|---|---|---|
| British Columbia (Lepine) 🔨 | 1 | 0 | 0 | 1 | 0 | 2 | 0 | 3 | 1 | 0 | 8 |
| Newfoundland and Labrador (Stockley) | 0 | 0 | 2 | 0 | 1 | 0 | 3 | 0 | 0 | 1 | 7 |

| Sheet H | 1 | 2 | 3 | 4 | 5 | 6 | 7 | 8 | 9 | 10 | Final |
|---|---|---|---|---|---|---|---|---|---|---|---|
| New Brunswick (McDermott) 🔨 | 1 | 0 | 2 | 0 | 0 | 1 | 0 | 1 | 1 | X | 6 |
| Saskatchewan (Kerr) | 0 | 3 | 0 | 1 | 2 | 0 | 3 | 0 | 0 | X | 9 |

==== Draw 5 ====
| Sheet B | 1 | 2 | 3 | 4 | 5 | 6 | 7 | 8 | 9 | 10 | Final |
|---|---|---|---|---|---|---|---|---|---|---|---|
| Ontario (Potter) 🔨 | 0 | 3 | 0 | 1 | 0 | 1 | 0 | 2 | 0 | X | 7 |
| Nova Scotia (Martin) | 0 | 0 | 1 | 0 | 2 | 0 | 1 | 0 | 1 | X | 5 |

| Sheet C | 1 | 2 | 3 | 4 | 5 | 6 | 7 | 8 | 9 | 10 | Final |
|---|---|---|---|---|---|---|---|---|---|---|---|
| Quebec (Charette) 🔨 | 0 | 1 | 0 | 2 | 0 | 1 | 0 | 1 | 0 | X | 5 |
| New Brunswick (McDermott) | 0 | 0 | 0 | 0 | 2 | 0 | 0 | 0 | 1 | X | 3 |

| Sheet E | 1 | 2 | 3 | 4 | 5 | 6 | 7 | 8 | 9 | 10 | Final |
|---|---|---|---|---|---|---|---|---|---|---|---|
| Saskatchewan (Kerr) 🔨 | 1 | 0 | 1 | 1 | 0 | 3 | 5 | 0 | 2 | X | 13 |
| Northern Ontario (Brown) | 0 | 2 | 0 | 0 | 1 | 0 | 0 | 1 | 0 | X | 4 |

| Sheet H | 1 | 2 | 3 | 4 | 5 | 6 | 7 | 8 | 9 | 10 | Final |
|---|---|---|---|---|---|---|---|---|---|---|---|
| Manitoba (Jones) 🔨 | 2 | 1 | 0 | 2 | 3 | 2 | 0 | 3 | X | X | 13 |
| Northwest Territories/Yukon (Delorey) | 0 | 0 | 2 | 0 | 0 | 0 | 1 | 0 | X | X | 3 |

==== Draw 6 ====
| Sheet A | 1 | 2 | 3 | 4 | 5 | 6 | 7 | 8 | 9 | 10 | Final |
|---|---|---|---|---|---|---|---|---|---|---|---|
| Northwest Territories/Yukon (Delorey) 🔨 | 1 | 0 | 0 | 0 | 2 | 0 | 1 | 2 | 1 | 0 | 7 |
| Newfoundland and Labrador (Stockley) | 0 | 2 | 2 | 1 | 0 | 2 | 0 | 0 | 0 | 1 | 8 |

| Sheet D | 1 | 2 | 3 | 4 | 5 | 6 | 7 | 8 | 9 | 10 | Final |
|---|---|---|---|---|---|---|---|---|---|---|---|
| Nova Scotia (Martin) 🔨 | 0 | 1 | 0 | 1 | 0 | 0 | 1 | 1 | 0 | X | 4 |
| British Columbia (Lepine) | 0 | 0 | 4 | 0 | 2 | 2 | 0 | 0 | 2 | X | 10 |

| Sheet F | 1 | 2 | 3 | 4 | 5 | 6 | 7 | 8 | 9 | 10 | Final |
|---|---|---|---|---|---|---|---|---|---|---|---|
| Manitoba (Jones) 🔨 | 0 | 1 | 4 | 1 | 3 | 0 | X | X | X | X | 9 |
| Prince Edward Island (Creamer) | 1 | 0 | 0 | 0 | 0 | 3 | X | X | X | X | 4 |

| Sheet H | 1 | 2 | 3 | 4 | 5 | 6 | 7 | 8 | 9 | 10 | Final |
|---|---|---|---|---|---|---|---|---|---|---|---|
| Ontario (Potter) 🔨 | 1 | 0 | 1 | 1 | 1 | 0 | 0 | 0 | 2 | X | 6 |
| Alberta (Odegard) | 0 | 1 | 0 | 0 | 0 | 1 | 1 | 1 | 0 | X | 4 |

==== Draw 7 ====
| Sheet A | 1 | 2 | 3 | 4 | 5 | 6 | 7 | 8 | 9 | 10 | Final |
|---|---|---|---|---|---|---|---|---|---|---|---|
| British Columbia (Lepine) 🔨 | 1 | 0 | 0 | 2 | 0 | 0 | 0 | 1 | 0 | 1 | 5 |
| Saskatchewan (Kerr) | 0 | 1 | 1 | 0 | 0 | 0 | 0 | 0 | 1 | 0 | 3 |

| Sheet C | 1 | 2 | 3 | 4 | 5 | 6 | 7 | 8 | 9 | 10 | Final |
|---|---|---|---|---|---|---|---|---|---|---|---|
| Newfoundland and Labrador (Stockley) 🔨 | 0 | 3 | 0 | 1 | 1 | 0 | 1 | 2 | 0 | X | 8 |
| Northern Ontario (Brown) | 1 | 0 | 3 | 0 | 0 | 1 | 0 | 0 | 0 | X | 5 |

| Sheet E | 1 | 2 | 3 | 4 | 5 | 6 | 7 | 8 | 9 | 10 | Final |
|---|---|---|---|---|---|---|---|---|---|---|---|
| Alberta (Odegard) 🔨 | 1 | 0 | 0 | 2 | 1 | 0 | 2 | 1 | 0 | X | 7 |
| Quebec (Charette) | 0 | 1 | 1 | 0 | 0 | 1 | 0 | 0 | 1 | X | 4 |

| Sheet G | 1 | 2 | 3 | 4 | 5 | 6 | 7 | 8 | 9 | 10 | Final |
|---|---|---|---|---|---|---|---|---|---|---|---|
| Prince Edward Island (Creamer) 🔨 | 3 | 0 | 0 | 1 | 0 | 1 | 0 | 2 | 0 | 1 | 8 |
| New Brunswick (McDermott) | 0 | 2 | 2 | 0 | 1 | 0 | 2 | 0 | 0 | 0 | 7 |

==== Draw 8 ====
| Sheet B | 1 | 2 | 3 | 4 | 5 | 6 | 7 | 8 | 9 | 10 | Final |
|---|---|---|---|---|---|---|---|---|---|---|---|
| New Brunswick (McDermott) 🔨 | 0 | 0 | 3 | 0 | 3 | 1 | 0 | 4 | 0 | X | 11 |
| Manitoba (Jones) | 0 | 1 | 0 | 1 | 0 | 0 | 3 | 0 | 2 | X | 7 |

| Sheet D | 1 | 2 | 3 | 4 | 5 | 6 | 7 | 8 | 9 | 10 | Final |
|---|---|---|---|---|---|---|---|---|---|---|---|
| Quebec (Charette) 🔨 | 0 | 0 | 0 | 0 | 1 | 0 | 2 | 0 | 1 | 0 | 4 |
| Ontario (Potter) | 0 | 1 | 0 | 0 | 0 | 1 | 0 | 2 | 0 | 1 | 5 |

| Sheet F | 1 | 2 | 3 | 4 | 5 | 6 | 7 | 8 | 9 | 10 | Final |
|---|---|---|---|---|---|---|---|---|---|---|---|
| Northern Ontario (Brown) 🔨 | 0 | 1 | 2 | 3 | 0 | 0 | 0 | 3 | 1 | X | 10 |
| Northwest Territories/Yukon (Delorey) | 1 | 0 | 0 | 0 | 2 | 1 | 2 | 0 | 0 | X | 6 |

| Sheet H | 1 | 2 | 3 | 4 | 5 | 6 | 7 | 8 | 9 | 10 | Final |
|---|---|---|---|---|---|---|---|---|---|---|---|
| Saskatchewan (Kerr) 🔨 | 1 | 0 | 3 | 0 | 0 | 3 | 0 | 2 | 0 | X | 9 |
| Nova Scotia (Martin) | 0 | 1 | 0 | 1 | 1 | 0 | 1 | 0 | 1 | X | 5 |

==== Draw 9 ====
| Sheet B | 1 | 2 | 3 | 4 | 5 | 6 | 7 | 8 | 9 | 10 | Final |
|---|---|---|---|---|---|---|---|---|---|---|---|
| Northern Ontario (Brown) 🔨 | 0 | 0 | 1 | 0 | 1 | 0 | 0 | 0 | X | X | 2 |
| Ontario (Potter) | 1 | 0 | 0 | 2 | 0 | 3 | 1 | 1 | X | X | 8 |

| Sheet D | 1 | 2 | 3 | 4 | 5 | 6 | 7 | 8 | 9 | 10 | Final |
|---|---|---|---|---|---|---|---|---|---|---|---|
| Saskatchewan (Kerr) 🔨 | 1 | 0 | 2 | 0 | 0 | 2 | 0 | 0 | 4 | X | 9 |
| Manitoba (Jones) | 0 | 1 | 0 | 0 | 1 | 0 | 1 | 0 | 0 | X | 3 |

| Sheet F | 1 | 2 | 3 | 4 | 5 | 6 | 7 | 8 | 9 | 10 | Final |
|---|---|---|---|---|---|---|---|---|---|---|---|
| New Brunswick (McDermott) 🔨 | 0 | 0 | 3 | 0 | 2 | 0 | 1 | 0 | 0 | 2 | 8 |
| Nova Scotia (Martin) | 1 | 1 | 0 | 1 | 0 | 1 | 0 | 1 | 1 | 0 | 6 |

| Sheet G | 1 | 2 | 3 | 4 | 5 | 6 | 7 | 8 | 9 | 10 | Final |
|---|---|---|---|---|---|---|---|---|---|---|---|
| Quebec (Charette) 🔨 | 4 | 0 | 0 | 1 | 0 | 2 | 2 | 3 | X | X | 12 |
| Northwest Territories/Yukon (Delorey) | 0 | 1 | 1 | 0 | 0 | 0 | 0 | 0 | X | X | 2 |

==== Draw 10 ====
| Sheet A | 1 | 2 | 3 | 4 | 5 | 6 | 7 | 8 | 9 | 10 | 11 | Final |
|---|---|---|---|---|---|---|---|---|---|---|---|---|
| Nova Scotia (Martin) 🔨 | 0 | 0 | 2 | 0 | 0 | 1 | 0 | 0 | 3 | 1 | 1 | 8 |
| Alberta (Odegard) | 1 | 1 | 0 | 2 | 1 | 0 | 1 | 1 | 0 | 0 | 0 | 7 |

| Sheet C | 1 | 2 | 3 | 4 | 5 | 6 | 7 | 8 | 9 | 10 | Final |
|---|---|---|---|---|---|---|---|---|---|---|---|
| Northwest Territories/Yukon (Delorey) 🔨 | 1 | 0 | 0 | 0 | 1 | 1 | 2 | 0 | 0 | 1 | 6 |
| Prince Edward Island (Creamer) | 0 | 2 | 0 | 0 | 0 | 0 | 0 | 2 | 4 | 0 | 8 |

| Sheet E | 1 | 2 | 3 | 4 | 5 | 6 | 7 | 8 | 9 | 10 | Final |
|---|---|---|---|---|---|---|---|---|---|---|---|
| Ontario (Potter) 🔨 | 1 | 0 | 2 | 0 | 2 | 0 | 3 | 0 | 4 | X | 12 |
| British Columbia (Lepine) | 0 | 1 | 0 | 2 | 0 | 3 | 0 | 2 | 0 | X | 8 |

| Sheet G | 1 | 2 | 3 | 4 | 5 | 6 | 7 | 8 | 9 | 10 | Final |
|---|---|---|---|---|---|---|---|---|---|---|---|
| Manitoba (Jones) 🔨 | 3 | 0 | 0 | 0 | 0 | 0 | 0 | 2 | 0 | X | 5 |
| Newfoundland and Labrador (Stockley) | 0 | 0 | 1 | 0 | 1 | 0 | 0 | 0 | 0 | X | 2 |

==== Draw 11 ====
| Sheet B | 1 | 2 | 3 | 4 | 5 | 6 | 7 | 8 | 9 | 10 | Final |
|---|---|---|---|---|---|---|---|---|---|---|---|
| Prince Edward Island (Creamer) 🔨 | 1 | 0 | 1 | 0 | 0 | 0 | 1 | 0 | 2 | X | 5 |
| Quebec (Charette) | 0 | 1 | 0 | 2 | 1 | 0 | 0 | 2 | 0 | X | 6 |

| Sheet C | 1 | 2 | 3 | 4 | 5 | 6 | 7 | 8 | 9 | 10 | Final |
|---|---|---|---|---|---|---|---|---|---|---|---|
| Alberta (Odegard) 🔨 | 1 | 0 | 0 | 1 | 0 | 1 | 0 | 0 | 2 | 1 | 6 |
| New Brunswick (McDermott) | 0 | 0 | 3 | 0 | 1 | 0 | 2 | 2 | 0 | 0 | 8 |

| Sheet E | 1 | 2 | 3 | 4 | 5 | 6 | 7 | 8 | 9 | 10 | Final |
|---|---|---|---|---|---|---|---|---|---|---|---|
| Newfoundland and Labrador (Stockley) 🔨 | 0 | 2 | 0 | 0 | 1 | 0 | 1 | 0 | 0 | X | 4 |
| Saskatchewan (Kerr) | 2 | 0 | 2 | 1 | 0 | 1 | 0 | 2 | 0 | X | 8 |

| Sheet H | 1 | 2 | 3 | 4 | 5 | 6 | 7 | 8 | 9 | 10 | Final |
|---|---|---|---|---|---|---|---|---|---|---|---|
| British Columbia (Lepine) 🔨 | 3 | 1 | 0 | 3 | 0 | 1 | 0 | 0 | 2 | X | 10 |
| Northern Ontario (Brown) | 0 | 0 | 4 | 0 | 1 | 0 | 1 | 0 | 0 | X | 6 |

==== Draw 12 ====
| Sheet A | 1 | 2 | 3 | 4 | 5 | 6 | 7 | 8 | 9 | 10 | Final |
|---|---|---|---|---|---|---|---|---|---|---|---|
| Newfoundland and Labrador (Stockley) 🔨 | 0 | 0 | 1 | 0 | 1 | 0 | 1 | 2 | 0 | 3 | 8 |
| New Brunswick (McDermott) | 0 | 0 | 0 | 2 | 0 | 3 | 0 | 0 | 2 | 0 | 7 |

| Sheet C | 1 | 2 | 3 | 4 | 5 | 6 | 7 | 8 | 9 | 10 | Final |
|---|---|---|---|---|---|---|---|---|---|---|---|
| British Columbia (Lepine) 🔨 | 0 | 5 | 0 | 0 | 0 | 2 | 0 | 1 | 1 | X | 9 |
| Quebec (Charette) | 0 | 0 | 1 | 1 | 1 | 0 | 2 | 0 | 0 | X | 5 |

| Sheet E | 1 | 2 | 3 | 4 | 5 | 6 | 7 | 8 | 9 | 10 | Final |
|---|---|---|---|---|---|---|---|---|---|---|---|
| Prince Edward Island (Creamer) 🔨 | 1 | 0 | 1 | 2 | 0 | 0 | 0 | 0 | 1 | X | 5 |
| Northern Ontario (Brown) | 0 | 5 | 0 | 0 | 2 | 1 | 1 | 1 | 0 | X | 10 |

| Sheet G | 1 | 2 | 3 | 4 | 5 | 6 | 7 | 8 | 9 | 10 | 11 | Final |
|---|---|---|---|---|---|---|---|---|---|---|---|---|
| Alberta (Odegard) 🔨 | 1 | 0 | 0 | 0 | 3 | 0 | 2 | 0 | 0 | 0 | 0 | 6 |
| Saskatchewan (Kerr) | 0 | 0 | 1 | 1 | 0 | 0 | 0 | 2 | 1 | 1 | 1 | 7 |

==== Draw 13 ====
| Sheet B | 1 | 2 | 3 | 4 | 5 | 6 | 7 | 8 | 9 | 10 | Final |
|---|---|---|---|---|---|---|---|---|---|---|---|
| Saskatchewan (Kerr) 🔨 | 0 | 2 | 0 | 0 | 2 | 0 | 2 | 1 | 1 | X | 8 |
| Northwest Territories/Yukon (Delorey) | 1 | 0 | 0 | 1 | 0 | 2 | 0 | 0 | 0 | X | 4 |

| Sheet D | 1 | 2 | 3 | 4 | 5 | 6 | 7 | 8 | 9 | 10 | Final |
|---|---|---|---|---|---|---|---|---|---|---|---|
| Northern Ontario (Brown) 🔨 | 1 | 0 | 1 | 1 | 0 | 1 | 0 | 2 | 0 | X | 6 |
| Nova Scotia (Martin) | 0 | 3 | 0 | 0 | 1 | 0 | 3 | 0 | 2 | X | 9 |

| Sheet E | 1 | 2 | 3 | 4 | 5 | 6 | 7 | 8 | 9 | 10 | Final |
|---|---|---|---|---|---|---|---|---|---|---|---|
| Quebec (Charette) 🔨 | 0 | 3 | 0 | 0 | 1 | 0 | 1 | 1 | 0 | 1 | 7 |
| Manitoba (Jones) | 1 | 0 | 1 | 2 | 0 | 1 | 0 | 0 | 1 | 0 | 6 |

| Sheet G | 1 | 2 | 3 | 4 | 5 | 6 | 7 | 8 | 9 | 10 | Final |
|---|---|---|---|---|---|---|---|---|---|---|---|
| New Brunswick (McDermott) 🔨 | 2 | 0 | 0 | 3 | 0 | 1 | 0 | 3 | 2 | X | 11 |
| Ontario (Potter) | 0 | 0 | 2 | 0 | 2 | 0 | 2 | 0 | 0 | X | 6 |

==== Draw 14 ====
| Sheet A | 1 | 2 | 3 | 4 | 5 | 6 | 7 | 8 | 9 | 10 | 11 | Final |
|---|---|---|---|---|---|---|---|---|---|---|---|---|
| Manitoba (Jones) 🔨 | 2 | 0 | 0 | 2 | 0 | 1 | 2 | 0 | 1 | 0 | 1 | 9 |
| British Columbia (Lepine) | 0 | 1 | 1 | 0 | 3 | 0 | 0 | 1 | 0 | 2 | 0 | 8 |

| Sheet C | 1 | 2 | 3 | 4 | 5 | 6 | 7 | 8 | 9 | 10 | Final |
|---|---|---|---|---|---|---|---|---|---|---|---|
| Ontario (Potter) 🔨 | 1 | 0 | 2 | 0 | 2 | 0 | 0 | 4 | 0 | 1 | 10 |
| Newfoundland and Labrador (Stockley) | 0 | 1 | 0 | 2 | 0 | 2 | 1 | 0 | 2 | 0 | 8 |

| Sheet F | 1 | 2 | 3 | 4 | 5 | 6 | 7 | 8 | 9 | 10 | Final |
|---|---|---|---|---|---|---|---|---|---|---|---|
| Northwest Territories/Yukon (Delorey) 🔨 | 0 | 0 | 0 | 2 | 0 | 1 | 0 | 1 | 0 | X | 4 |
| Alberta (Odegard) | 0 | 1 | 0 | 0 | 2 | 0 | 1 | 0 | 5 | X | 9 |

| Sheet G | 1 | 2 | 3 | 4 | 5 | 6 | 7 | 8 | 9 | 10 | Final |
|---|---|---|---|---|---|---|---|---|---|---|---|
| Nova Scotia (Martin) 🔨 | 2 | 0 | 1 | 0 | 1 | 0 | 0 | 0 | 0 | X | 4 |
| Prince Edward Island (Creamer) | 0 | 1 | 0 | 1 | 0 | 2 | 2 | 2 | 1 | X | 9 |

==== Draw 15 ====
| Sheet A | 1 | 2 | 3 | 4 | 5 | 6 | 7 | 8 | 9 | 10 | Final |
|---|---|---|---|---|---|---|---|---|---|---|---|
| Alberta (Odegard) 🔨 | 2 | 0 | 1 | 1 | 0 | 1 | 0 | 0 | 2 | X | 7 |
| Northern Ontario (Brown) | 0 | 1 | 0 | 0 | 1 | 0 | 2 | 1 | 0 | X | 5 |

| Sheet C | 1 | 2 | 3 | 4 | 5 | 6 | 7 | 8 | 9 | 10 | Final |
|---|---|---|---|---|---|---|---|---|---|---|---|
| Prince Edward Island (Creamer) 🔨 | 1 | 0 | 1 | 0 | 0 | 2 | 0 | 0 | 0 | X | 4 |
| Saskatchewan (Kerr) | 0 | 1 | 0 | 0 | 3 | 0 | 2 | 1 | 0 | X | 7 |

| Sheet E | 1 | 2 | 3 | 4 | 5 | 6 | 7 | 8 | 9 | 10 | Final |
|---|---|---|---|---|---|---|---|---|---|---|---|
| British Columbia (Lepine) 🔨 | 2 | 1 | 1 | 0 | 0 | 2 | 1 | 3 | X | X | 10 |
| New Brunswick (McDermott) | 0 | 0 | 0 | 1 | 1 | 0 | 0 | 0 | X | X | 2 |

| Sheet H | 1 | 2 | 3 | 4 | 5 | 6 | 7 | 8 | 9 | 10 | Final |
|---|---|---|---|---|---|---|---|---|---|---|---|
| Newfoundland and Labrador (Stockley) 🔨 | 0 | 0 | 2 | 0 | 0 | 0 | 1 | 0 | 1 | X | 4 |
| Quebec (Charette) | 1 | 2 | 0 | 0 | 1 | 0 | 0 | 3 | 0 | X | 7 |

==== Draw 16 ====
| Sheet A | 1 | 2 | 3 | 4 | 5 | 6 | 7 | 8 | 9 | 10 | Final |
|---|---|---|---|---|---|---|---|---|---|---|---|
| Ontario (Potter) 🔨 | 1 | 0 | 0 | 3 | 0 | 2 | 1 | 2 | 1 | X | 10 |
| Prince Edward Island (Creamer) | 0 | 0 | 2 | 0 | 2 | 0 | 0 | 0 | 0 | X | 4 |

| Sheet D | 1 | 2 | 3 | 4 | 5 | 6 | 7 | 8 | 9 | 10 | Final |
|---|---|---|---|---|---|---|---|---|---|---|---|
| Manitoba (Jones) 🔨 | 0 | 0 | 2 | 0 | 1 | 0 | 0 | 0 | 2 | 0 | 5 |
| Alberta (Odegard) | 0 | 0 | 0 | 1 | 0 | 1 | 3 | 0 | 0 | 1 | 6 |

| Sheet F | 1 | 2 | 3 | 4 | 5 | 6 | 7 | 8 | 9 | 10 | Final |
|---|---|---|---|---|---|---|---|---|---|---|---|
| Nova Scotia (Martin) 🔨 | 1 | 0 | 0 | 0 | 0 | 2 | 1 | 0 | X | X | 4 |
| Newfoundland and Labrador (Stockley) | 0 | 3 | 2 | 2 | 1 | 0 | 0 | 1 | X | X | 9 |

| Sheet H | 1 | 2 | 3 | 4 | 5 | 6 | 7 | 8 | 9 | 10 | Final |
|---|---|---|---|---|---|---|---|---|---|---|---|
| Northwest Territories/Yukon (Delorey) 🔨 | 2 | 0 | 0 | 0 | 0 | 1 | X | X | X | X | 3 |
| British Columbia (Lepine) | 0 | 3 | 5 | 1 | 3 | 0 | X | X | X | X | 12 |

==== Draw 17 ====
| Sheet A | 1 | 2 | 3 | 4 | 5 | 6 | 7 | 8 | 9 | 10 | Final |
|---|---|---|---|---|---|---|---|---|---|---|---|
| Quebec (Charette) 🔨 | 3 | 3 | 0 | 1 | 1 | 1 | X | X | X | X | 9 |
| Nova Scotia (Martin) | 0 | 0 | 1 | 0 | 0 | 0 | X | X | X | X | 1 |

| Sheet D | 1 | 2 | 3 | 4 | 5 | 6 | 7 | 8 | 9 | 10 | Final |
|---|---|---|---|---|---|---|---|---|---|---|---|
| New Brunswick (McDermott) 🔨 | 0 | 0 | 2 | 0 | 0 | 0 | 1 | 1 | 4 | 0 | 8 |
| Northwest Territories/Yukon (Delorey) | 2 | 1 | 0 | 1 | 1 | 1 | 0 | 0 | 0 | 1 | 7 |

| Sheet F | 1 | 2 | 3 | 4 | 5 | 6 | 7 | 8 | 9 | 10 | Final |
|---|---|---|---|---|---|---|---|---|---|---|---|
| Saskatchewan (Kerr) 🔨 | 0 | 1 | 0 | 0 | 0 | 2 | 0 | 2 | 1 | 3 | 9 |
| Ontario (Potter) | 0 | 0 | 1 | 0 | 0 | 0 | 3 | 0 | 0 | 0 | 4 |

| Sheet G | 1 | 2 | 3 | 4 | 5 | 6 | 7 | 8 | 9 | 10 | Final |
|---|---|---|---|---|---|---|---|---|---|---|---|
| Northern Ontario (Brown) 🔨 | 0 | 0 | 2 | 1 | 0 | 2 | 0 | 1 | 0 | X | 6 |
| Manitoba (Jones) | 3 | 1 | 0 | 0 | 4 | 0 | 1 | 0 | 4 | X | 13 |

=== Playoffs ===
| Semifinal | | Final |
| Ontario | 6 |
| Saskatchewan | 10 | British Columbia | 7 |
| | | Saskatchewan | 8 |

==== Semifinal ====
| Sheet A | 1 | 2 | 3 | 4 | 5 | 6 | 7 | 8 | 9 | 10 | Final |
|---|---|---|---|---|---|---|---|---|---|---|---|
| Ontario (Potter) 🔨 | 1 | 0 | 0 | 2 | 1 | 0 | 2 | 0 | 0 | X | 6 |
| Saskatchewan (Kerr) | 0 | 1 | 2 | 0 | 0 | 1 | 0 | 4 | 2 | X | 10 |

Player percentages
| Ontario | | Saskatchewan | |
|---|---|---|---|
| Faye Linseman | 80% | Gertie Pick | 76% |
| Janelle Sadler | 76% | Kenda Richards | 64% |
| Muriel Potter | 70% | Linda Burnham | 80% |
| Joyce Potter | 65% | Nancy Kerr | 75% |
| Total | 73% | Total | 74% |

==== Final ====
| Sheet A | 1 | 2 | 3 | 4 | 5 | 6 | 7 | 8 | 9 | 10 | 11 | Final |
|---|---|---|---|---|---|---|---|---|---|---|---|---|
| British Columbia (Lepine) 🔨 | 0 | 1 | 0 | 2 | 0 | 0 | 4 | 0 | 0 | 0 | 0 | 7 |
| Saskatchewan (Kerr) | 0 | 0 | 1 | 0 | 1 | 1 | 0 | 1 | 2 | 1 | 1 | 8 |

Player percentages
| British Columbia | | Saskatchewan | |
|---|---|---|---|
| Diane Hill | 63% | Gertie Pick | 91% |
| Lyn Watson | 78% | Kenda Richards | 61% |
| Betty Johnston | 63% | Linda Burnham | 83% |
| Karen Lepine | 73% | Nancy Kerr | 83% |
| Total | 69% | Total | 80% |
