= 2010 World Mixed Doubles Curling Championship =

- Host city: Chelyabinsk, Russia
- Arena: Uralskaya Molnia Ice Palace
- Dates: April 18–24, 2010
- Winner: Russia
- Second: Petr Dron
- Lead: Yana Nekrasova
- Finalist: New Zealand

The 2010 World Mixed Doubles Curling Championship was held in Chelyabinsk, Russia from April 18–24, 2010. The event was held in conjunction with the 2010 World Senior Curling Championships. Many of the teams faced delays or withdrew from the championship due to the air travel disruption after the 2010 Eyjafjallajökull eruption.

== Teams ==
=== Blue group ===
Switzerland	Czech Republic	Sweden
Second: Toni Müller; Lead: Irene Schori	Second: Karel Kubeska; Lead: Anna Kubeskova	Withdrawn from the championship.
New Zealand	Denmark	South Korea
Second: Sean Becker; Lead: Bridget Becker	Second: Martin Uhd Grønbech; Lead: Christine Svensen	Withdrawn from the championship.
Austria		
Second: Marcus Schmitt; Lead: Liliana Schmitt		

=== Red group ===
Hungary	Finland	Scotland*
Second: Peter Sàrdi; Lead: Ágnes Patonai	Second: Peter Landgrén; Lead: Lotta Norri	Withdrawn from the championship.
Estonia	Italy	England
Second: Martin Lill; Lead: Kristiine Lill	Second: Marco Pascale; Lead: Lucrezia Laurenti	Second: John Sharp; Lead: Jane Clark
Norway*	Spain	
Withdrawn from the championship.	Second: Sergio Vez Labrador; Lead: Irantzu Garcia Vez	

=== Green group ===
Canada	China	Russia
Withdrawn from the championship.	Second: Zhang Zhipeng; Lead: Sun Yue	Second: Petr Dron; Lead: Yana Nekrasova
Latvia	Japan	United States
Second: Ansis Regza; Lead: Dace Regza	Second: Naomasa Takeda; Lead: Tomoko Takeda	Second: Michael Calcagno; Lead: Sharon Vukich
Australia	Slovakia	
Second: Hugh Millikin; Lead: Kim Forge	Second: Milan Kajan; Lead: Gabriela Kajanova	

=== Not Competing ===
The following teams were initially listed as participating in this event but are not included on the most recently updated schedule.

- Bulgaria
- France
- Poland

==== Competition Status following the Icelandic volcano incident ====
The following teams officially withdrew from the Championship due to the Icelandic volcano incident.

- Canada
- South Korea
- Norway
- Scotland
- Sweden

The following teams were delayed by the Icelandic volcano incident but still were able to make it to the Championship. Because these teams were delayed, the draws they were scheduled to play in were postponed until they arrived in Chelyabinsk.

- Finland
- Latvia
- United States

== Round robin ==
Blue group			Red group			Green group		
Country	W	L	Country	W	L	Country	W	L
Switzerland	4	0	Spain	4	1	Russia	6	0
New Zealand	3	1	Italy	3	2	China	4	2
Austria	1	3	Estonia	3	2	Australia	4	2
Denmark	1	3	Hungary	3	2	United States	3	3
Czech Republic	1	3	England	1	4	Japan	2	4
Sweden	-	-	Finland	1	4	Slovakia	1	5
South Korea	-	-	Norway	-	-	Latvia	1	5
			Scotland	-	-	Canada	-	-

== Results ==
All draw times are listed in Yekaterinburg Time (UTC+05).

=== Blue group ===
==== April 18 ====
Draw 2 13:00

Sheet A	1	2	3	4	5	6	7	8	Final
New Zealand	0	5	0	4	1	1	0	X	11
Austria	1	0	1	0	0	0	1	X	3

==== April 19 ====
Draw 4 09:00

Sheet C	1	2	3	4	5	6	7	8	Final
Switzerland	1	1	1	2	1	0	3	X	9
Austria	0	0	0	0	0	1	0	X	1

Draw 6 17:00

Sheet D	1	2	3	4	5	6	7	8	9	Final
Austria	5	0	0	1	0	0	3	0	2	11
Denmark	0	2	1	0	2	1	0	3	0	9

Sheet E	1	2	3	4	5	6	7	8	Final
Switzerland	2	0	0	4	3	0	2	X	11
New Zealand	0	1	3	0	0	1	0	X	5

==== April 20 ====
Draw 8 13:00

Sheet A	1	2	3	4	5	6	7	8	Final
Czech Republic	2	0	0	4	1	1	0	0	8
Denmark	0	4	1	0	0	0	2	2	9

==== April 21 ====
Draw 11 13:00

Sheet B	1	2	3	4	5	6	7	8	Final
New Zealand	4	0	0	2	1	1	X	X	8
Denmark	0	1	1	0	0	0	X	X	2

Draw 12 17:00

Sheet E	1	2	3	4	5	6	7	8	Final
Czech Republic	1	0	4	0	0	3	1	X	9
Austria	0	2	0	1	1	0	0	X	4

==== April 22 ====
Draw 14 13:00

Sheet A	1	2	3	4	5	6	7	8	Final
Switzerland	1	1	1	3	1	2	X	X	9
Czech Republic	0	0	0	0	0	0	X	X	0

Draw 15 17:00

Sheet C	1	2	3	4	5	6	7	8	Final
Denmark	0	0	1	1	0	0	4	0	6
Switzerland	1	1	0	0	2	1	0	2	7

Sheet D	1	2	3	4	5	6	7	8	Final
New Zealand	0	3	0	2	0	1	0	2	8
Czech Republic	1	0	1	0	4	0	1	0	7

=== Red group ===
==== April 18 ====
Draw 2 13:00

Sheet B	1	2	3	4	5	6	7	8	Final
Estonia	0	2	0	1	0	0	3	0	6
Hungary	1	0	1	0	2	1	0	2	7

Sheet E	1	2	3	4	5	6	7	8	Final
Spain	0	5	0	1	2	0	1	X	9
Italy	1	0	1	0	0	1	0	X	3

==== April 19 ====
Draw 4 09:00

Sheet D	1	2	3	4	5	6	7	8	Final
Finland	1	0	0	2	0	0	0	0	3
Estonia	0	1	1	0	1	1	1	1	6

Draw 5 13:00

Sheet A	1	2	3	4	5	6	7	8	Final
Spain	1	2	0	3	1	2	X	X	9
England	0	0	1	0	0	0	X	X	1

==== April 20 ====
Draw 7 09:00

Sheet A	1	2	3	4	5	6	7	8	Final
Estonia	0	1	0	0	4	0	4	0	9
Italy	2	0	5	1	0	2	0	1	11

Sheet C	1	2	3	4	5	6	7	8	Final
Hungary	0	3	0	1	0	1	0	1	6
Spain	2	0	3	0	1	0	1	0	7

Draw 9 17:00

Sheet B	1	2	3	4	5	6	7	8	Final
Spain	0	1	0	0	1	2	0	1	5
Estonia	2	0	3	1	0	0	1	0	7

Sheet C	1	2	3	4	5	6	7	8	Final
Finland	1	0	1	0	3	0	4	0	9
England	0	2	0	2	0	5	0	1	10

Sheet D	1	2	3	4	5	6	7	8	Final
Italy	4	1	1	2	0	1	0	X	9
Hungary	0	0	0	0	2	0	4	X	6

==== April 21 ====
Draw 11 13:00

Sheet A	1	2	3	4	5	6	7	8	Final
Italy	0	0	0	2	0	0	0	X	2
Finland	3	1	1	0	2	1	3	X	11

Sheet C	1	2	3	4	5	6	7	8	Final
England	1	1	0	0	0	0	2	0	4
Estonia	0	0	1	2	1	1	0	1	6

==== April 22 ====
Draw 13 09:00

Sheet B	1	2	3	4	5	6	7	8	Final
Hungary	4	0	2	1	2	0	X	X	9
Finland	0	1	0	0	0	2	X	X	3

Sheet C	1	2	3	4	5	6	7	8	Final
Italy	2	2	0	0	2	2	0	X	8
England	0	0	2	1	0	0	2	X	5

Draw 14 13:00

Sheet E	1	2	3	4	5	6	7	8	Final
Finland	0	0	3	1	0	2	1	0	7
Spain	3	1	0	0	2	0	0	2	8

Draw 15 17:00

Sheet A	1	2	3	4	5	6	7	8	Final
England	2	0	0	1	1	1	0	0	5
Hungary	0	2	1	0	0	0	2	2	7

=== Green group ===
==== April 18 ====
Draw 1 09:00

Sheet C	1	2	3	4	5	6	7	8	Final
Australia	0	0	1	0	2	0	1	X	4
China	3	1	0	2	0	1	0	X	7

Draw 3 17:00

Sheet A	1	2	3	4	5	6	7	8	Final
Slovakia	0	1	0	1	0	0	X	X	2
China	4	0	3	0	3	1	X	X	11

Sheet C	1	2	3	4	5	6	7	8	Final
Russia	0	3	0	1	1	0	2	X	7
Japan	1	0	2	0	0	1	0	X	4

==== April 19 ====
Draw 5 13:00

Sheet D	1	2	3	4	5	6	7	8	Final
Slovakia	0	0	0	1	1	0	X	X	2
United States	5	2	2	0	0	3	X	X	12

Sheet E	1	2	3	4	5	6	7	8	Final
Japan	0	0	1	1	0	0	1	X	3
Australia	2	2	0	0	3	2	0	X	9

Draw 6 17:00

Sheet B	1	2	3	4	5	6	7	8	Final
Russia	0	2	0	1	0	0	2	2	7
China	1	0	2	0	1	1	0	0	5

==== April 20 ====
Draw 7 09:00

Sheet D	1	2	3	4	5	6	7	8	Final
Russia	0	0	2	1	1	2	1	X	7
United States	2	1	0	0	0	0	0	X	3

Sheet E	1	2	3	4	5	6	7	8	Final
Latvia	0	0	1	0	2	0	1	0	4
China	1	1	0	3	0	3	0	1	9

Draw 8 13:00

Sheet B	1	2	3	4	5	6	7	8	Final
Australia	1	1	0	1	1	2	0	X	6
United States	0	0	1	0	0	0	2	X	3

Sheet C	1	2	3	4	5	6	7	8	Final
Japan	0	2	0	2	0	2	0	0	6
Slovakia	2	0	1	0	3	0	3	1	10

Draw 9 17:00

Sheet E	1	2	3	4	5	6	7	8	Final
Japan	2	0	1	0	3	0	1	0	7
Latvia	0	1	0	3	0	1	0	1	6

==== April 21 ====
Draw 10 09:00

Sheet A	1	2	3	4	5	6	7	8	Final
Australia	2	0	4	0	1	0	1	X	8
Latvia	0	2	0	1	0	1	0	X	4

Sheet C	1	2	3	4	5	6	7	8	Final
China	5	0	5	0	3	0	X	X	13
United States	0	1	0	3	0	1	X	X	5

Sheet E	1	2	3	4	5	6	7	8	Final
Russia	1	0	4	1	0	1	0	3	10
Slovakia	0	1	0	0	1	0	4	0	6

Draw 12 17:00

Sheet A	1	2	3	4	5	6	7	8	Final
United States	1	0	0	0	2	1	0	3	7
Japan	0	1	1	1	0	0	1	0	4

Sheet B	1	2	3	4	5	6	7	8	Final
Slovakia	0	0	0	1	0	0	1	X	2
Australia	2	1	1	0	2	1	0	X	7

Sheet C	1	2	3	4	5	6	7	8	Final
Latvia	0	1	0	1	0	3	0	X	5
Russia	2	0	3	0	1	0	1	X	7

==== April 22 ====
Draw 13 09:00

Sheet D	1	2	3	4	5	6	7	8	Final
Latvia	5	1	0	1	1	0	0	1	9
Slovakia	0	0	2	0	0	2	3	0	7

Sheet E	1	2	3	4	5	6	7	8	Final
Australia	1	1	0	0	0	2	0	X	4
Russia	0	0	3	1	3	0	1	X	8

Draw 15 17:00

Sheet B	1	2	3	4	5	6	7	8	Final
China	0	1	0	1	0	2	0	0	4
Japan	1	0	1	0	2	0	2	2	8

Sheet E	1	2	3	4	5	6	7	8	Final
United States	4	0	0	3	0	0	0	2	9
Latvia	0	1	1	0	4	1	1	0	8

== Tie-breaker ==
Friday, April 23, 08:30

Sheet D	1	2	3	4	5	6	7	8	Final
Austria	1	1	0	0	0	1	0	X	3
Denmark	0	0	2	3	1	0	2	X	8

Friday, April 23, 11:30

Sheet A	1	2	3	4	5	6	7	8	Final
Czech Republic	0	3	0	1	0	0	4	0	8
Denmark	1	0	1	0	1	1	0	2	6

Sheet B	1	2	3	4	5	6	7	8	Final
Estonia	3	1	0	0	2	0	3	0	9
Hungary	0	0	2	2	0	1	0	3	8

== Playoffs ==
Qualification Game
Czech Republic	7
Estonia	12

Quarterfinals
R1	Spain	8
R3	Estonia	7
B2	New Zealand	10
R2	Italy	4
G3	Australia	4
G1	Russia	8
B1	Switzerland	7
G2	China	11

Semifinals
R1	Spain	3
B2	New Zealand	10
G1	Russia	16
G2	China	4

Gold-medal match
B1	New Zealand	7
G1	Russia	9

Bronze-medal match
R1	Spain	7
G2	China	8

=== Qualification Game ===
Friday, April 23, 15:30

Sheet E	1	2	3	4	5	6	7	8	Final
Czech Republic	2	0	0	0	4	0	1	X	7
Estonia	0	3	2	1	0	6	0	X	12

=== Quarterfinals ===
Friday, April 23, 19:30

Sheet D	1	2	3	4	5	6	7	8	9	Final
Spain	0	3	0	0	2	0	2	0	1	8
Estonia	1	0	1	1	0	2	0	2	0	7

Sheet A	1	2	3	4	5	6	7	8	Final
New Zealand	3	0	4	0	0	2	1	X	10
Italy	0	1	0	2	1	0	1	X	4

Sheet B	1	2	3	4	5	6	7	8	Final
Australia	1	0	1	0	0	1	1	X	4
Russia	0	3	0	1	4	0	0	X	8

Sheet E	1	2	3	4	5	6	7	8	9	Final
Switzerland	0	1	1	0	2	0	3	0	0	7
China	2	0	0	1	0	3	0	1	4	11

=== Semifinals ===
Saturday, April 24, 9:00

Sheet B	1	2	3	4	5	6	7	8	Final
Spain	0	0	0	2	1	0	0	X	3
New Zealand	2	1	1	0	0	5	1	X	10

Sheet D	1	2	3	4	5	6	7	8	Final
Russia	4	0	6	1	0	1	4	X	16
China	0	1	0	0	3	0	0	X	4

=== Bronze-medal game ===
Saturday, April 24, 14:00

Sheet B	1	2	3	4	5	6	7	8	9	Final
Spain	1	0	1	0	1	0	4	0	0	7
China	0	2	0	1	0	3	0	1	1	8

=== Gold-medal game ===
Saturday, April 24, 14:00

Sheet D	1	2	3	4	5	6	7	8	9	Final
New Zealand	0	0	1	3	1	0	2	0	0	7
Russia	3	1	0	0	0	2	0	1	2	9

2010 World Mixed Doubles Curling Championship Winner
(Russia)
Russia
1st title
