= Beth Bronger-Jones =

American curler

- Curler ♀

Team
- Curling club: Granite CC, Seattle, WA

Curling career
- Member Association: United States
- World Championship: 1 (1987)
Medal record
Curling
United States Women's Championship
Gold medal – first place	1987 St. Paul
United States Mixed Championship
Gold medal – first place	1985 Detroit
United States Senior Championships
Silver medal – second place	2014 Eau Claire

Beth Bronger-Jones is an American curler from Seattle, Washington. She is a United States women's champion (1987) and mixed champion (1985).

Bronger-Jones started to curl at the Granite Curling Club (Seattle) in 1979. She played second on the team that won the United States' women's championship in 1987.

== Teams ==
=== Women's ===
Season	Skip	Third	Second	Lead	Events
1986–87	Sharon Good	Joan Fish	Beth Bronger-Jones	Aija Edwards	1987 USWCC (gold); 1987 WWCC (5th)
2013–14	Sharon Vukich	Linda Cornfield	Miyo Konno	Beth Bronger-Jones	2014 USSCC (silver)
2014–15	Sharon Vukich	Beth Bronger-Jones	Laurel Haigh Gore	Linda Cornfield	2015 USSCC (4th)

=== Mixed ===
Season	Skip	Third	Second	Lead	Events
1985	Doug Jones	Beth Bronger-Jones	Bob Anderson	Cheryl Hardy	USMxCC 1985 (gold)
