= Susi Kiesel =

German female curler

- Curler ♀

Team
- Curling club: CC Schwenningen, Schwenningen, Germany

Curling career
- Member Association: West Germany
- World Championship: 3 (1979, 1980, 1982)
- European Championship: 2 (1978, 1979)
Medal record
Curling
German Women's Championship
Gold medal – first place	1979
Gold medal – first place	1980
Gold medal – first place	1982

Susi Kiesel is a former German curler.

At the international level, she competed in three World Women's Championships and two European Championships, mainly as a skip.

== Teams ==
Season	Skip	Third	Second	Lead	Events
1978–79	Renate Grüner	Susi Kiesel	Irmi Wagner	Valentina Fischer-Weppler	ECC 1978 (5th)
1978–79	Susi Kiesel	Gisela Lunz	Heidi Schapman	Trudi Benzing	WCC 1979 (8th)
1979–80	Susi Kiesel	Gisela Lunz	Hildegard Meier	Trudi Benzing	ECC 1979 (6th)
1979–80	Susi Kiesel	Gisela Lunz	Trudi Benzing	Ines Campagnolo	WCC 1980 (9th)
1981–82	Susi Kiesel	Gisela Lunz	Trudi Benzing	Daniela Kiesel	WCC 1982 (9th)
