= Jane Sanderson (curler) =

Scottish female curler

- Curler ♀
- Born: 17 August 1962 (age 64)

Team
- Curling club: Perth CC, Perth

Curling career
- Member Association: Scotland
- World Championship: 1 (1980)
- European Championship: 1 (1980)
Medal record
Curling
World Championships
Bronze medal – third place	1980 Perth
European Championships
Bronze medal – third place	1980 Copenhagen
Scottish Women's Championship
Gold medal – first place	1980

Jane Sanderson (born 17 August 1962) is a Scottish curler and curling coach.

She is a 1980 World bronze medallist.

== Teams ==
=== Women's ===
Season	Skip	Third	Second	Lead	Events
1979–80	Betty Law	Bea Sinclair	Jane Sanderson	Carol Hamilton	SWCC 1980 (gold); WCC 1980 (bronze)
1980–81	Betty Law	Bea Sinclair	Jane Sanderson	Carol Hamilton	ECC 1980 (bronze)

=== Mixed ===
Season	Skip	Third	Second	Lead	Events
1978	Jimmy Sanderson	Jane Sanderson	Iain Baxter	Helen Baxter	SMxCC 1978 (gold)

== Record as a coach of national teams ==
Year	Tournament, event	National team	Place
1997	1997 European Curling Championships	Scotland (women)	6
1998	1998 Winter Olympics	United Kingdom (women)	4
2002	2002 World Wheelchair Curling Championship	Scotland (wheelchair)	3rd place, bronze medalist(s)
2004	2004 World Wheelchair Curling Championship	Scotland (wheelchair)	1st place, gold medalist(s)
2005	2005 World Wheelchair Curling Championship	Scotland (wheelchair)	1st place, gold medalist(s)

== Awards ==
- Scottish Disability Sports Awards - Fife Trophy - Coach of the Year Award: 2004
