= Betty Kozai =

American curler (1928–2021)

- Curler
- Born: October 12, 1928
- Died: January 18, 2021 (aged 92)

Team
- Curling club: Granite Curling Club (Seattle)

Curling career
- World Championship: 1 (1980)
Medal record
Women's curling
Representing United States
United States Women's Championship
Gold medal – first place	1980 Seattle

Betty Kozai (October 12, 1928 – January 18, 2021) was an American curler from Seattle, Washington.

== Curling career ==
Kozai won the US national championship in 1980, on a team skipped by her daughter Sharon. That team went on to finish in fourth place at that year's world championship. She returned to international competition at the age of 81, representing the United States at the 2010 World Senior Curling Championships.

== Personal life ==
Kozai was a founding member of Granite Curling Club in Seattle, and curled there until the last years of her life. Her three daughters and four grandchildren have also been long-time curlers at Granite.

== Teams ==
=== Women's ===
Season	Skip	Third	Second	Lead	Alternate	Coach	Events
1979–80	Sharon Kozai	Joan Fish	Betty Kozai	Aija Edwards			1980 USWCC (gold); 1980 WWCC (4th)
2009–10	Sharon Vukich	Linda Cornfield	Susan Curtis	Betty Kozai	Dani Thibodeaux		2010 USSCC (gold)
2009–10	Sharon Vukich	Mary Colacchio	Susan Curtis	Betty Kozai	Dani Thibodeaux	Kenneth Thomson	2010 WSCC (4th)
2012–13	Sharon Vukich	Linda Cornfield	Colleen Richardson	Betty Kozai			2013 USSCC (4th)
