= Sharon Vukich =

American curler

- Curler
- Other names: Sharon Good
- Born: Sharon Kozai

Team
- Curling club: Granite CC, Seattle, WA

Curling career
- Member Association: United States
- World Championship: 2 (1980, 1987)
- World Mixed Doubles Championship: 1 (2010)
Medal record
Curling
United States Women's Championship
Gold medal – first place	1980 Seattle
Gold medal – first place	1987 St. Paul
United States Mixed Doubles Championship
Gold medal – first place	2010 Seattle

Sharon Vukich is an American curler from Seattle, Washington. She is a two-time women's national Champion, two-time senior women's national champion, and one-time mixed doubles national champion.

== Curling career ==
Vukich skipped her team to gold at the United States Championship twice, in 1980 and 1987. As champion she represented the United States at the World Championships those years, finishing in fourth and fifth place, respectively. She returned to national prominence with back-to-back gold medals at the United States Senior Championships in 2009 and 2010. At World's they finished sixth and fourth places, respectively. In 2010 she also won the Mixed Doubles National Championship with teammate Mike Calcagno. The 2010 World Mixed Doubles Championship was held concurrently with the World Senior Championship and Vukich competed at both. At World Mixed Doubles they finished in tenth place.

== Personal life ==
Vukich's parents were curlers and helped found the Granite Curling Club in Seattle. Vukich met her late husband Jim while curling. He was also a multi-time national champion, having won the Men's Championship in 1987 and 1989. Vukich's daughter Emily (Em) Good and son Jake Vukich are also successful competitive curlers, Emily having competed at the 2016 World Mixed Curling Championship and Jake at the 2014 World Junior Curling Championships.

== Teams ==
=== Women's ===
Season	Skip	Third	Second	Lead	Alternate	Coach	Events
1979–80	Sharon Kozai	Joan Fish	Betty Kozai	Aija Edwards			1980 USWCC (gold); 1980 WWCC (4th)
1986–87	Sharon Good	Joan Fish	Beth Bronger-Jones	Aija Edwards			1987 USWCC (gold); 1987 WWCC (5th)
2008–09	Cristin Clark	Sharon Vukich	Emily Good	Katy Sharpe	Gabrielle Coleman		2009 USWCC/USOCT (9th)
2008–09	Sharon Vukich	Joan Fish	Cathie Tomlinson	Aija Edwards			2009 USSCC (gold); 2009 WSCC (6th)
2009–10	Sharon Vukich	Linda Cornfield	Susan Curtis	Betty Kozai	Dani Thibodeaux		2010 USSCC (gold)
2009–10	Sharon Vukich	Mary Colacchio	Susan Curtis	Betty Kozai	Dani Thibodeaux	Kenneth Thomson	2010 WSCC (4th)
2010–11	Sharon Vukich						2011 USSCC (5th)
2011–12	Cristin Clark	Em Good	Elle LeBeau	Sharon Vukich		Brady Clark	
2011–12	Sharon Vukich	Miyo Konno	Linda Cornfield	Cathie Tomlinson			2012 USSCC (silver)
2012–13	Sharon Vukich	Cynthia Garzina	Jennifer Westhagen	Cathie Tomlinson			
2012–13	Sharon Vukich	Linda Cornfield	Colleen Richardson	Betty Kozai			2013 USSCC (4th)
2013–14	Sharon Vukich	Linda Cornfield	Miyo Konno	Beth Bronger-Jones			2014 USSCC (silver)
2014–15	Sharon Vukich	Beth Bronger-Jones	Laurel Haigh Gore	Linda Cornfield			2015 USSCC (4th)

=== Mixed doubles ===
Season	Female	Male	Events
2009–10	Sharon Vukich	Mike Calcagno	2010 USMDCC (gold); 2010 WMDCC (10th)
2010–11	Sharon Vukich	Mike Calcagno	2011 USMDCC (DNQ)
2011–12	Sharon Vukich	Christopher Rimple	2012 USMDCC (DNQ)
2013–14	Sharon Vukich	David Cornfield	2014 USMDCC (SF)
2014–15	Sharon Vukich	David Cornfield	2015 USMDCC (DNQ)
