= Bea Sinclair =

Scottish female curler

- Curler ♀

Team
- Curling club: Perth CC, Perth

Curling career
- Member Association: Scotland
- World Championship: 1 (1980)
- European Championship: 1 (1980)
Medal record
Curling
World Championships
Bronze medal – third place	1980 Perth
European Championships
Bronze medal – third place	1980 Copenhagen
Scottish Women's Championship
Gold medal – first place	1980

Bea Sinclair is a Scottish curler.

She is a 1980 World bronze medallist.

== Teams ==
Season	Skip	Third	Second	Lead	Events
1979–80	Betty Law	Bea Sinclair	Jane Sanderson	Carol Hamilton	SWCC 1980 (gold); WCC 1980 (bronze)
1980–81	Betty Law	Bea Sinclair	Jane Sanderson	Carol Hamilton	ECC 1980 (bronze)
