= Aija Edwards =

American curler

- Curler ♀

Team
- Curling club: Granite CC, Seattle, WA

Curling career
- Member Association: United States
- World Championship: 2 (1980, 1987)
- Other appearances: World Senior Championships: 1 (2009)
Medal record
Curling
United States Women's Championship
Gold medal – first place	1980 Seattle
Gold medal – first place	1987 St. Paul
United States Senior Championships
Gold medal – first place	2009 Janesville

Aija Edwards is an American curler from Seattle, Washington. She is a two-time women's national champion (1980, 1987) and a former senior women's national champion (2009).

== Teams ==
Season	Skip	Third	Second	Lead	Events
1979–80	Sharon Kozai	Joan Fish	Betty Kozai	Aija Edwards	1980 USWCC (gold); 1980 WWCC (4th)
1986–87	Sharon Good	Joan Fish	Beth Bronger-Jones	Aija Edwards	1987 USWCC (gold); 1987 WWCC (5th)
2008–09	Sharon Vukich	Joan Fish	Cathie Tomlinson	Aija Edwards	2009 USSCC (gold); 2009 WSCC (6th)

== Personal life ==
Her sister-in-law Joan Fish is also a curler, they are teammates on US and World women's and seniors championships.
