= 1980 Royal Bank of Scotland World Women's Curling Championship =

- Host city: Perth, Scotland
- Arena: Perth Ice Rink
- Dates: 17–21 March 1980
- Winner: Canada
- Curling club: Caledonian CC; Regina, Saskatchewan
- Skip: Marj Mitchell
- Third: Nancy Kerr
- Second: Shirley McKendry
- Lead: Wendy Leach
- Finalist: Sweden (Elisabeth Högström)

The 1980 Royal Bank of Scotland World Women's Curling Championship, the women's world curling championship, was held from 17 to 21 March at the Perth Ice Rink in Perth, Scotland.

== Teams ==
Canada	Denmark	France	Germany	Italy
Caledonian CC, Regina, Saskatchewan Skip: Marj Mitchell; Third: Nancy Kerr; Second: Shirley McKendry; Lead: Wendy Leach	Hvidovre CC, Hvidovre Fourth: Helena Blach; Skip: Marianne Jørgensen; Second: Astrid Birnbaum; Lead: Malene Krause	Megève CC, Megève Skip: Paulette Sulpice; Third: Agnes Mercier; Second: Huguette Jullien; Lead: Anne-Claude Wolfers	CC Schwenningen Skip: Susi Kiesel; Third: Gisela Lunz; Second: Trudi Benzing; Lead: Ines Campagnolo	Cortina CC, Cortina d'Ampezzo Skip: Maria-Grazzia Constantini; Third: Nella Alvera; Second: Marina Pavani; Lead: Ann Lacedelli
Norway	Scotland	Sweden	Switzerland	United States
Asker CC, Oslo Skip: Ellen Githmark; Third: Trine Trulsen; Second: Ingvill Githmark; Lead: Kirsten Vaule	Perth CC, Perth Skip: Betty Law; Third: Bea Sinclair; Second: Jane Sanderson; Lead: Carol Hamilton	Karlstads CK, Karlstad Skip: Elisabeth Högström; Third: Carina Olsson; Second: Birgitta Sewik; Lead: Karin Sjögren	Lausanne CC, Lausanne Skip: Gaby Charrière; Third: Marie-Louise Favre; Second: Marianne Uhlmann; Lead: Cécilie Blanvillian	Granidears CC, Seattle, Washington Skip: Sharon Kozai; Third: Joan Fish; Second: Betty Kozai; Lead: Aija Edwards

== Round-robin standings ==
Key
Teams to playoffs
Teams to tiebreaker

Country	Skip	W	L
Sweden	Elisabeth Högström	8	1
Canada	Marj Mitchell	8	1
Scotland	Betty Law	7	2
Italy	Maria-Grazzia Constantini	5	4
United States	Sharon Kozai	5	4
France	Paulette Sulpice	4	5
Norway	Ellen Githmark	4	5
Switzerland	Gaby Charrière	2	7
Germany	Susi Kiesel	1	8
Denmark	Marianne Jørgensen	1	8

== Round-robin results ==
=== Draw 1 ===
Team	Final
United States (Kozai)	7
Norway (Githmark)	9

Team	Final
Switzerland (Charrière)	11
Germany (Kiesel)	2

Team	Final
France (Sulpice)	7
Sweden (Högström)	10

Team	Final
Canada (Mitchell)	9
Italy (Constantini)	7

Team	Final
Denmark (Jørgensen)	2
Scotland (Law)	10

=== Draw 2 ===
Team	Final
Germany (Kiesel)	3
Canada (Mitchell)	14

Team	Final
Scotland (Law)	6
Sweden (Högström)	13

Team	Final
Italy (Constantini)	11
Switzerland (Charrière)	5

Team	Final
Norway (Githmark)	10
Denmark (Jørgensen)	6

Team	Final
United States (Kozai)	8
France (Sulpice)	6

=== Draw 3 ===
Team	Final
Sweden (Högström)	12
Italy (Constantini)	3

Team	Final
Canada (Mitchell)	12
United States (Kozai)	3

Team	Final
Norway (Githmark)	4
Scotland (Law)	6

Team	Final
France (Sulpice)	8
Germany (Kiesel)	4

Team	Final
Switzerland (Charrière)	10
Denmark (Jørgensen)	6

=== Draw 4 ===
Team	Final
Norway (Githmark)	2
Italy (Constantini)	11

Team	Final
Denmark (Jørgensen)	4
United States (Kozai)	8

Team	Final
France (Sulpice)	1
Canada (Mitchell)	10

Team	Final
Switzerland (Charrière)	4
Sweden (Högström)	12

Team	Final
Scotland (Law)	10
Germany (Kiesel)	4

=== Draw 5 ===
Team	Final
Sweden (Högström)	15
Denmark (Jørgensen)	6

Team	Final
France (Sulpice)	7
Norway (Githmark)	4

Team	Final
Italy (Constantini)	4
Scotland (Law)	7

Team	Final
Germany (Kiesel)	9
United States (Kozai)	10

Team	Final
Switzerland (Charrière)	5
Canada (Mitchell)	8

=== Draw 6 ===
Team	Final
Canada (Mitchell)	9
Denmark (Jørgensen)	1

Team	Final
Scotland (Law)	8
France (Sulpice)	4

Team	Final
United States (Kozai)	8
Sweden (Högström)	5

Team	Final
Norway (Githmark)	11
Switzerland (Charrière)	5

Team	Final
Germany (Kiesel)	9
Italy (Constantini)	10

=== Draw 7 ===
Team	Final
Italy (Constantini)	8
France (Sulpice)	9

Team	Final
Germany (Kiesel)	9
Denmark (Jørgensen)	3

Team	Final
United States (Kozai)	8
Switzerland (Charrière)	4

Team	Final
Canada (Mitchell)	11
Scotland (Law)	4

Team	Final
Sweden (Högström)	9
Norway (Githmark)	7

=== Draw 8 ===
Team	Final
Scotland (Law)	10
Switzerland (Charrière)	5

Team	Final
Italy (Constantini)	9
United States (Kozai)	2

Team	Final
Sweden (Högström)	7
Canada (Mitchell)	6

Team	Final
Germany (Kiesel)	6
Norway (Githmark)	15

Team	Final
Denmark (Jørgensen)	6
France (Sulpice)	5

=== Draw 9 ===
Team	Final
Sweden (Högström)	15
Germany (Kiesel)	7

Team	Final
Norway (Githmark)	1
Canada (Mitchell)	10

Team	Final
Denmark (Jørgensen)	5
Italy (Constantini)	9

Team	Final
United States (Kozai)	5
Scotland (Law)	8

Team	Final
France (Sulpice)	8
Switzerland (Charrière)	7

== Tiebreaker ==
Team	Final
United States (Kozai)	10
Italy (Constantini)	5

== Playoffs ==
Semifinals
1	Sweden	9
4	United States	5
2	Canada	9
3	Scotland	4

Final
1	Sweden	6
2	Canada	7

=== Semifinals ===
Team	Final
Sweden (Högström)	9
United States (Kozai)	5

Team	Final
Canada (Mitchell)	9
Scotland (Law)	4

=== Final ===
Team	Final
Sweden (Högström)	6
Canada (Mitchell)	7

1980 Royal Bank of Scotland World Women's Curling Championship
(Canada)
Canada
1st title
