= Marj Mitchell =

Canadian curler (1948–1983)

Medal record

Representing Canada

Women's curling

World Championships
Gold medal – first place	1980 Perth	Team

Marjorie Mitchell (August 27, 1948 in Glen Ewen, Saskatchewan – October 18, 1983 in Regina, Saskatchewan) was a Canadian curler. She was the skip for the winning team at the 1980 World Curling Championships, and the 1980 Canadian Ladies Curling Association Championship, the forerunner to the Scott Tournament of Hearts. Mitchell died of cancer in 1983. The sportsmanship award at the Scotties Tournament of Hearts is called the Marj Mitchell Sportsmanship Award in her honour.

In addition to her titles in 1980, Mitchell also won the CBC Classic in 1975 and a university championship in 1972, skipping the University of Saskatchewan team. She also played softball, winning the Saskatchewan Senior A championship in 1971 and 1972, and played fastball, winning provincial championships in 1973 and 1974 with the Saskatoon Baldwinettes.

At the time of her death, Mitchell worked as a rehabilitation consultant with Armstrong and Associates. She had also worked with the government of Saskatchewan's Social Services Department as a vocational counsellor.
