= List of curlers =

List of sport persons who play the sport of curling

This is a list of sportspersons who play the sport of curling, past and present, sorted by nationality. Canadian curlers are further sorted by province.

== Andorra ==
- Ana Arce

== Australia ==
- Jim Allan (in NZL too)
- Dustin Armstrong
- Andy Campbell
- Gerald Chick (in Manitoba too)
- Neil Galbraith
- Sean Hall
- Dean Hewitt
- Stephen Hewitt (Steve Hewitt)
- Tyler Hogan
- David Imlah
- Steve Johns
- Brian Johnson
- Daniel Joyce
- Tom Kidd
- Jay Merchant
- Hugh Millikin
- Ian Palangio
- Matt Panoussi
- Trevor Schumm
- Brian Stuart
- Ricky Tasker
- John Theriault
- Mitchell (Mitch) Thomas
- Jonathan Wade
- Mike Woloschuk
- Kim Forge
- Lynette Kate Gill
- Tahli Gill
- Anne Powell
- Laurie Weeden
- Helen Williams

== Austria ==
- Jonas Backofen
- Manfred Fabi
- Mathias Genner
- Matthäus Hofer
- Günther Hummelt
- Roland Koudelka (His name is "Roland", not "Ronald" - it is a mistake in WCF database.)
- Alois Kreidl
- Dieter Küchenmeister
- Florian Mavec
- Günther Märker
- Richard Obermoser
- Martin Reichel
- Stefan Salinger
- Markus Schagerl
- Andreas Unterberger
- Werner Wanker
- Sebastian Wunderer
- Hannah Augustin
- Claudia Fischer
- Marianne Gartner
- Karina Toth

== Belarus ==
- Dmitry Kirillov
- Pavel Petrov
- Ilya Shalamitski
- Susanna Ivashyna
- Ekaterina Kirillova
- Polina Petrova
- Tatsiana Tarsunova

== Belgium ==
- Dirk Heylen
- Veerle Geerinckx

== Brazil ==
- Marcio Cerquinho
- Elian Rocha
- Victor Santos
- Luciana Barrella
- Alessandra Barros
- Giovanna Barros
- Raissa Rodrigues
- Anne Shibuya

== Canada ==
=== Alberta ===
- Ted Appelman
- Matt Baldwin
- Don Bartlett
- Brendan Bottcher
- Mike Chernoff
- Kerr Drummond
- Gabriel Dyck
- Darrell Ell
- Randy Ferbey
- John Ferguson
- Colton Flasch
- Hec Gervais
- Andrew Gittis
- Wayne Hart
- Jeremy Harty
- Ben Hebert
- Dan Holowaychuk
- Neil Houston
- Ryan Jacques
- Mark Johnson
- Dale Johnston
- Kyler Kleibrink
- Marc Kennedy
- Jamie King
- Kevin Koe
- Ed Lukowich
- Cliff Manahan
- Karrick Martin
- Kevin Martin
- Pat McCallum
- Don McKenzie
- John Morris
- Darren Moulding
- David Nedohin
- Ron Northcott
- Howard Palmer
- Dan Petryk
- Scott Pfeifer
- Rollie Robinson
- Marcel Rocque
- Billy Rose
- Carter Rycroft
- Tom Sallows
- Ron Schindle
- Jimmy Shields (Jim)
- Aaron Sluchinski
- Brent Syme
- Johnson Tao
- Bradley Thiessen
- Nolan Thiessen
- Charley Thomas
- Ken Tralnberg
- Murray Ursulak
- Don Walchuk
- Desmond Young
- Glenys Bakker
- Chelsey Bell
- Cheryl Bernard
- Brenda Bohmer
- Rachelle Brown
- Chelsea Carey
- Zoe Cinnamon
- Catherine Clifford
- Judy Erickson
- Lisa Eyamie
- Dana Ferguson
- Jennifer Gates
- Serena Gray-Withers
- Jessie Haughian
- Becca Hebert
- Kate Horne
- Sandra Jenkins
- Christine Keshen
- Cathy King
- Shannon Kleibrink
- Gail Lee
- Betty McCracken
- Rona McGregor
- Myrna McKay
- Myrna McQuarrie
- Cary-Anne McTaggart
- Kristie Moore
- Morgan Muise
- Heather Nedohin
- Amy Nixon
- Susan O'Connor
- Paige Papley
- Jocelyn Peterman
- Laine Peters
- Casey Scheidegger
- Danielle Schmiemann
- Nadine Scotland
- Susan Seitz
- Ashton Skrlik
- Kayla Skrlik
- Renée Sonnenberg
- Selena Sturmay
- Val Sweeting
- Alison Thiessen
- Bronwen Webster
- Crystal Webster
- Sarah Wilkes

=== British Columbia ===
- Andrew Bilesky
- Tom Buchy
- Corey Chester
- Jim Cotter
- Lyall Dagg
- Dale Dalziel (in USA too)
- Frenchy D'Amour
- Darin Fenton
- Kevin Folk
- Rick Folk
- Sean Geall
- Brent Giles
- Bert Gretzinger
- Tyrel Griffith
- Alex Horvath
- Dean Joanisse
- Ryan Kuhn
- Greg McAulay
- Nick Meister
- Sterling Middleton
- Bryan Miki
- David Nantes
- Andrew Nerpin
- George Norgan
- Brent Pierce
- Joe Rea (Joseph)
- Gerry Richard
- Jeff Richard
- Pat Ryan
- Rick Sawatsky
- Tom Shypitka
- Bernie Sparkes
- Ron Steinhauer
- Jody Sveistrup
- Bob Ursel
- Roy Vinthers
- Mike Wood
- Michelle Allen
- Jacquie Armstrong
- Lorraine Bowles
- Laurie Carney
- Sasha Carter
- Jaelyn Cotter
- Elaine Dagg-Jackson
- Diane Dezura
- Samantha Fisher
- Diane Gushulak
- Dezaray Hawes
- Louise Herlinveaux
- Shannon Joanisse
- Debbie Jones-Walker
- Ashley Klymchuk
- Patti Knezevic
- Dawn Knowles (Harris)
- Kelley Law
- Sarah Loken
- Allison MacInnes
- Kayla MacMillan
- Marla Mallett
- Deb Massullo
- Megan McGillivray
- Linda Moore
- Cheryl Noble
- Dailene Pewarchuk
- Sarah Pyke
- Taylor Reese-Hansen
- Lynsay Ryan
- Pat Sanders
- Jeanna Schraeder
- Kelly Scott
- Penny Shantz
- Renee Simons
- Julie Skinner
- Melissa Soligo
- Lindsay Sparkes
- Jodie Sutton (Jodi)
- Kalia Van Osch
- Kesa Van Osch
- Sarah Wark
- Georgina Wheatcroft
- Karri Willms
- Robin Wilson

=== Manitoba ===
- Brendan Bilawka
- Zack Bilawka
- David Bohn
- Terry Braunstein
- Kerry Burtnyk
- Bill Carey
- Dan Carey
- Reid Carruthers
- Gerald Chick (in AUS too)
- Jimmy Congalton
- Kyle Doering
- Don Duguid
- Randy Dutiaume
- Keith Fenton
- Denis Fillion
- Alex Forrest
- Barry Fry
- Ryan Fry
- Jacques Gauthier
- Rob Gordon
- Steve Gould
- Bob Gourley
- Ab Gowanlock
- Darryl Gunnlaugson
- Jason Gunnlaugson
- John Helston
- Colin Hodgson
- Gordon Hudson
- Ron Kammerlock
- Colin Kurz
- Kyle Kurz
- Allan Lyburn
- Mike McEwen
- Hugh McFadyen
- Gordon McTavish
- Jon Mead
- Rob Meakin
- Orest Meleschuk
- B. J. Neufeld
- Denni Neufeld
- Randy Neufeld
- Connor Njegovan
- Mark Olson
- Brian Pallister
- Brayden Payette
- Jordan Peters
- Vic Peters
- Jim Pettapiece
- Michael Riley
- Greg Romaniuk (in USA too)
- Don Rudd
- Jeff Ryan
- Derek Samagalski
- Garth Smith
- Gordon Sparkes
- Jim Spencer
- Jeff Stoughton
- Harold Tanasichuk
- Brian Toews
- Ken Tresoor
- Ray Turnbull
- Garry Van Den Berghe
- Billy Walsh
- Ken Watson
- Jimmy Welsh
- Ryan Wiebe
- Errick Willis
- Howard Wood, Sr.
- Russ Wookey
- Matt Wozniak
- Abby Ackland
- Laurie Allen
- Iris Armstrong
- Janet Arnott
- Shannon Birchard
- Maureen Bonar
- Kate Cameron
- Peggy Casselman
- Jennifer Clark-Rouire
- Brianna Cullen
- Betty Duguid
- Kerri Einarson
- Mackenzie Elias
- Kristen Foster
- Lois Fowler
- Liz Fyfe
- Cathy Gauthier
- Kristin Gordon
- Melissa Gordon-Kurz
- Briane Harris
- Janet Harvey
- Robyn Henry
- Jennifer Jones
- Krysten Karwacki
- Breanne Knapp
- Connie Laliberte
- Kaitlyn Lawes
- Lauren Lenentine
- Jenna Loder
- Kristy McDonald
- Dawn McEwen
- Selena Njegovan
- Jill Officer
- Sara Oliver
- Cathy Overton-Clapham
- Beth Peterson
- Katherine Remillard
- Darcy Robertson
- Dot Rose
- Cathy Shaw
- Barb Spencer
- Meghan Walter
- Lindsay Warkentin
- Lana Watson (she's in England too)
- Raunora Westcott
- Leslie Wilson-Westcott
- Patti Wuthrich
- Emily Zacharias
- Mackenzie Zacharias

=== New Brunswick ===
- Josh Barry
- Jared Bezanson
- Jamie Brannen
- Rene Comeau
- Jordon Craft
- Paul Dobson
- Zach Eldridge
- Ryan Freeze
- Arthur D. Ganong
- Hardy N. Ganong
- James Grattan
- Russ Howard
- Chris Jeffrey
- Scott Jones
- Kevin Keefe
- Mike Kennedy
- Brian King
- Marc LeCocq
- Jeremy Mallais
- Spencer Mawhinney
- Andy McCann
- Daryell Nowlan
- Grant Odishaw
- Terry Odishaw
- Rick Perron
- Jordan Pinder
- Darren Roach
- Jason Roach
- Alex Robichaud
- Ryan Sherrard
- Charlie Sullivan
- Jim Sullivan
- Tommy Sullivan
- Wayne Tallon
- Keith Wendorf
- Melissa Adams
- Jennifer Armstrong
- Nicole Arsenault Bishop
- Rebecca Atkinson
- Jillian Babin
- Jane Boyle
- Brigitte Comeau
- Justine Comeau
- Sandy Comeau
- Jodie deSolla
- Mabel DeWare
- Katie Forward
- Heidi Hanlon
- Ashley Howard
- Andrea Kelly
- Emma Le Blanc
- Kendra Lister
- Emily MacRae
- Sarah Mallais
- Nancy McConnery
- Keira McLaughlin
- Morgan Muise
- Jeanette Murphy
- Denise Nowlan
- Danielle Parsons
- Sylvie Quillian
- Kayla Russell
- Heather Smith
- Lianne Sobey
- Shannon Tatlock
- Jaclyn Tingley
- Cathlia Ward
- Molli Ward
- Carol Whitaker

=== Newfoundland and Labrador ===
- Mike Adam
- Matthew Blandford
- Daniel Bruce
- Adam Casey
- Bob Cole
- Jamie Danbrook
- Brett Gallant
- Brad Gushue
- Doug Hudson
- Nathan King
- Jamie Korab
- Ryan LeDrew
- Jack MacDuff
- Toby McDonald
- Ryan McNeil Lamswood
- Mark Nichols
- Chris Schille
- Ken Templeton
- Geoff Walker
- Lauren Barron
- Sue Anne Bartlett
- Sarah Boland
- Camille Burt
- Cathy Cunningham
- Erica Curtis
- Stacie Curtis
- Peg Goss
- Stephanie Guzzwell
- Beth Hamilton
- Shelley Hardy
- Julie Hynes
- Margaret Knickle
- Heather Martin
- Adrienne Mercer
- Mackenzie Mitchell
- Erin Porter
- Heather Strong
- Laura Strong
- Jessica Wiseman

=== Nova Scotia ===
- Shawn Adams
- Travis Colter
- Philip Crowell
- Mark Dacey
- Jamie Danbrook
- Fred Dyke
- Ian Fitzner-LeBlanc
- Paul Flemming
- Andrew Gibson
- Thomas Håkansson (in Sweden too)
- Mathew Harris
- Rob Harris
- Ragnar Kamp
- Mark Kehoe
- Wally Knock
- Bruce Lohnes
- Murray MacNeill
- Matthew Manuel
- Robert Mayhew
- Kelly Mittelstadt
- Jamie Murphy
- Alan O'Leary
- Don Oyler
- Jordan Pinder
- Scott Saccary
- Luke Saunders
- Chad Stevens
- Tommy Sullivan
- Stuart Thompson
- Nick Zachernuk
- Mary-Anne Arsenault
- Shelley Barker
- Jennifer Baxter
- Christina Black
- Theresa Breen
- Jill Brothers
- Karlee Burgess
- Lindsey Burgess
- Erin Carmody
- Cathy Caudle
- Marie Christianson
- Kristin Clarke
- Jennifer Crouse
- Marg Cutcliffe
- Nancy Delahunt
- Emily Dwyer
- Karlee Everist
- Mary Fay
- Cate Fitzgerald
- Maria Fitzgerald
- Stephanie Guzzwell
- Meredith Harrison
- Karen Hennigar
- Sharon Horne
- Beth Iskiw
- Barbara Jones-Gordon (Barb Jones-Gordon, Barbara Jones)
- Colleen Jones
- Kaitlyn Jones
- Blisse Joyce
- Kim Kelly
- Margaret Knickle
- Penny LaRocque
- Janique LeBlanc
- Lauren Lenentine
- Emma Logan
- Brigitte MacPhail
- Mary Mattatall
- Nancy McConnery
- Jenn Mitchell
- Monica Moriarty (Jones)
- Sarah Murphy
- Danielle Parsons
- Laine Peters
- Colleen Pinkney
- Marlee Powers
- Mary Sue Radford
- Heather Rankin
- Pamela Sanford
- Stephanie Schmidt
- Heather Smith
- Jenn Smith
- Taylour Stevens
- Teri Udle
- Alison Umlah

=== Nunavut ===
- Hunter Tootoo
- Kaitlin MacDonald
- Sadie Pinksen
- Alison Taylor
- Christianne West

=== Ontario ===
- Chad Allen
- Peter Andersen
- Mike Anderson
- Jim Armstrong
- Leigh Armstrong
- Scott Bailey
- Greg Balsdon
- Tim Belcourt
- Jonathan Beuk
- Mark Bice
- Steve Bice
- Bryan Burgess
- Jason Camm
- Mat Camm
- Gordon Campbell
- David Carruthers
- Kent Carstairs
- Bryan Cochrane
- Peter Corner
- Jeff Currie
- Matt Dumontelle
- John Epping
- Travis Fanset
- Al Fiskar
- Caleb Flaxey
- Wesley Forget
- Ray Grant
- Ron Green
- Al Hackner
- Bert Hall
- E. J. Harnden
- Ryan Harnden
- Mike Harris
- Ross Harstone
- Richard Hart
- Jacob Horgan
- Tanner Horgan
- Glenn Howard
- Russ Howard
- Scott Howard
- Brad Jacobs
- Mike Jakubo
- Jacob Jones
- George Karrys
- Mark Kean
- Bruce Kennedy
- Jayden King
- Adam Kingsbury
- Brent Laing
- Rick Lang
- Connor Lawes
- Evan Lilly
- Gavin Lydiate
- Tim March
- David Mathers
- Mike McCarville
- Scott McDonald
- Larry Merkley
- Wayne Middaugh
- Collin Mitchell
- Scott Mitchell
- Sam Mooibroek
- Bob Nicol (Nichol)
- Dylan Niepage
- Scott Patterson
- Pat Perroud
- Alf Phillips, Jr.
- Howard Rajala
- Tom Ramsay
- Landan Rooney
- Paul Savage
- Craig Savill
- Adam Spencer
- Nathan Steele
- Ian Tetley
- G. Clifton Thompson
- Jon Thurston (Jonathon)
- Ed Werenich
- John Willsey
- Bob Woods
- Jason Young
- Kirk Ziola
- Diane Adams
- Hailey Armstrong
- Jan Augustyn
- Marika Bakewell
- Megan Balsdon
- Corie Beveridge
- Tess Bobbie
- Marilyn Bodogh
- Chelsea Brandwood
- Kira Brunton
- Krysta Burns
- Chrissy Cadorin
- Courtney Chenier
- Calissa Daly
- Lindsay Dubue
- Hollie Duncan
- Anne Dunn
- Lori Eddy
- Jenna Enge
- Allison Flaxey
- Margot Flemming
- Tracy Fleury
- Amanda Gates
- Jen Gates
- Kim Gellard
- Tara George
- Alison Goring
- Sara Guy
- Jenn Hanna
- Jacqueline Harrison
- Julie Hastings
- Rachel Homan
- Heather Houston
- Carly Howard
- Danielle Inglis
- Collinda Joseph
- Tracy Kennedy
- Alison Kreviazuk
- Cheryl Kreviazuk
- Lynn Kreviazuk
- Isabelle Ladouceur
- Lorraine Lang
- Morgan Lavell
- Kari Lavoie
- Andrea Lawes
- Stephanie LeDrew
- Kendra Lilly
- Carrie Lindner
- Grace Lloyd
- Krista McCarville
- Kathy McEdwards
- Cheryl McPherson
- Anne Merklinger
- Kelly Middaugh
- Sherry Middaugh
- Emma Miskew
- Kim Moore
- Janet Murphy
- Jestyn Murphy
- Nini Mutch
- Jane Hooper Perroud
- Sarah Potts
- Lauren Rajala
- Jo-Ann Rizzo
- Melanie Robillard
- Karen Sagle
- Lisa Savage
- Ashley Sippala
- Jamie Smith
- Megan Smith
- Gloria Taylor
- Kimberly Tuck
- Kristin Turcotte
- Kirsten Wall
- Katelyn Wasylkiw
- Lauren Wasylkiw
- Julia Weagle
- Lisa Weagle
- Jennifer Wylie

=== Prince Edward Island ===
- Josh Barry
- Robert Campbell
- Anson Carmody
- Adam Casey
- Morgan Currie
- Jamie Danbrook
- Robbie Doherty
- Brett Gallant
- Peter Gallant
- Ian MacAulay
- David Mathers
- Daryell Nowlan
- Mark O'Rourke
- Suzanne Birt
- Shelly Bradley
- Erin Carmody
- Marie Christianson
- Stefanie Clark
- Kim Dolan
- Sarah Fullerton
- Sharon Horne
- Meaghan Hughes
- Lauren Lenentine
- Rebecca Jean MacPhee
- Leslie MacDougall
- Tricia MacGregor
- Robyn MacPhee
- Susan McInnis
- Anne Merklinger
- Kathy O'Rourke
- Geri-Lynn Ramsay
- Michelle Shea
- Carol Whitaker

=== Quebec ===
- Émile Asselin
- Félix Asselin
- Alek Bédard
- Marco Berthelot
- Pierre Charette
- Simon Dupuis
- Robert Desjardins
- William Dion
- Maxime Elmaleh
- Martin Ferland
- Mike Fournier
- Jean Gagnon
- Guy Hemmings
- Bradley Lequin
- Jean-Michel Ménard
- Louis Quevillon
- François Roberge
- Vincent Roberge
- Brian Ross
- Eric Sylvain
- Jean-François Trépanier
- Jim Ursel
- Nancy Bélanger
- Eve Bélisle
- Florence Boivin
- Marie-France Larouche
- Annie Lemay
- Lauren Mann
- Kelly Middaugh
- Anna Munroe
- Brenda Nicholls
- Chantal Osborne
- Emily Riley
- Alanna Routledge
- Joëlle Sabourin
- Cynthia St-Georges
- Laurie St-Georges
- Noémie Verreault

=== Saskatchewan ===
- Scott Bitz
- Randy Bryden
- Garnet Campbell
- Colton Flasch
- Brad Heidt
- Eugene Hritzuk
- Trevor Johnson
- Brennen Jones
- Joel Jordison
- Dustin Kalthoff
- Dustin Kidby
- Wayne Kiel
- Rylan Kleiter
- Bruce Korte
- Steve Laycock
- Dan Marsh
- Kevin Marsh
- Joshua Mattern
- Harvey Mazinke
- Darrell McKee
- Shaun Meachem
- Ron Mills
- Dallan Muyres
- Kirk Muyres
- Arnold Richardson
- Ernie Richardson
- Garnet Richardson
- Wes Richardson
- Catlin Schneider
- Pat Simmons
- Matthieu Taillon
- Jim Wilson
- Tom Wilson
- Skylar Ackerman
- Sherry Anderson
- Penny Barker
- Jan Betker
- Dayna Demmans
- Deanna Doig
- Chantelle Eberle
- Michelle Englot
- Rachel Erickson
- Emily Farnham
- Sylvia Fedoruk
- Anita Ford
- Christie Gamble
- Marcia Gudereit
- Amber Holland
- Ashley Howard
- Atina Johnston
- Sherry Just
- Heather Kalenchuk
- Marliese Kasner
- Nancy Kerr
- Chaelynn Kitz
- Stefanie Lawton
- Wendy Leach
- Joan McCusker
- Joyce McKee
- Shirley McKendry
- Marjorie Mitchell
- Vera Pezer
- Kelly Schafer
- Sandra Schmirler
- Kim Schneider
- Tammy Schneider
- Dorenda Schoenhals
- Danielle Sicinski
- Robyn Silvernagle
- Kaylin Skinner
- Taylor Stremick
- Ashley Thevenot
- Kara Thevenot
- Marie Wright

=== Yukon/Northwest Territories ===
- Brad Chorostkowski
- Paul Delorey
- Fred Koe
- Jamie Koe
- Thomas Scoffin
- Cory Vanthuyne
- Shona Barbour
- Hailey Birnie
- Bev Buckway
- Sharon Cormier
- Margot Flemming
- Kerry Galusha
- Teejay Haichert
- Chelsea Jarvis
- Megan Koehler
- Sarah Koltun
- Wendy Miller
- Dawn Moses
- Bayly Scoffin
- Andrea Sinclair

=== Wheelchair curlers ===
- James Anseeuw
- Gerry Austgarden
- Jim Armstrong
- Don Bell
- Karen Blachford
- Gary Cormack
- Chris Daw
- Ina Forrest
- Richard Fraser
- Sonja Gaudet
- Mark Ideson
- Bruce McAninch
- Darryl Neighbour
- Jim Primavera
- Chris Sobkowicz
- Dennis Thiessen
- Marie Wright
- Bruno Yizek

=== Coaches only ===
- Amy McAninch
- Tom Ward (curler)

== China ==
- Ba Dexin
- Chen Jianxin
- Chen Lu'an
- Fei Xueqing
- Guo Wenli
- Han Peng
- He Jun
- Ji Yansong
- Jiang Dongxu
- Li Dongyan
- Li Guangxu
- Li Hongchen
- Li Jianrui
- Li Zhichao
- Ling Zhi
- Liu Riu
- Liu Wei
- Ma Xiuyue
- Ma Yanlong
- Shao Zhilin
- Tian Jiafeng
- Wang Fengchun
- Wang Haitao
- Wang Jinbo
- Wang Zhenhao
- Wang Zhiyu
- Xu Jingtao
- Xu Xiaoming
- Xu Xinchen
- Yan Zhou
- Zang Jialang
- Zhang Mingliang
- Zhang Qiang
- Zhang Rongrui
- Zhang Wei
- Zhang Zhipeng
- Zou Dejia
- Zou Qiang
- Dong Ziqi
- Fan Suyuan
- Fu Yiwei
- Han Yu
- Jiang Jiayi
- Jiang Xindi
- Jiang Yilun
- Liu Jinli
- Liu Sijia
- Liu Yin
- Ma Jingyi
- Mei Jie
- She Qiutong
- Su Tingyu
- Sun Yue
- Wang Bingyu
- Wang Meng
- Wang Rui
- Xu Guangqin
- Yan Hui
- Yang Ying
- Yao Mingyue
- Yu Jiaxin
- Yu Xinna
- Yue Qingshuang
- Zhang Lijun
- Zhang Xindi
- Zhou Yan

== Czech Republic ==
- Jakub Bareš
- Radek Boháč
- Jiří Candra
- Marek Černovský
- Vít Chabičovský
- Miloš Hoferka
- Jindřich Kitzberger
- Lukáš Klíma
- Lukáš Klípa
- Karel Kubeška
- Samuel Mokriš
- Tomáš Paul
- Jiří Snítil
- Martin Snítil
- Karel Uher
- Marek Vydra
- Alžběta Baudyšová (Alzbeta Baudysova)
- Michaela Baudyšová (Michaela Baudysova, Michaela Baudyšova, Michaela Baudysová)
- Lenka Černovská (Lenka Cernovska)
- Veronika Herdová (Veronika Herdova)
- Luisa Illková (Luisa Illkova)
- Sára Jahodová (Sara Jahodova) (in ENG too)
- Eliška Jalovcová (Eliska Jalovcova)
- Linda Klímová (Linda Klimova)
- Ežen Kolčevská (Ezhen Kolchevskaia)
- Anna Kubešková
- Kamila Mulačová (Kamila Mošová)
- Zuzana Paulová
- Karolína Pilařová
- Tereza Plíšková (Tereza Pliskova)
- Klára Svatoňová
- Kateřina Urbanová (Katerina Urbanova)
- Petra Vinšová (Petra Vinsová, Petra Vinsova)
- Julie Zelingrová (Zelingrova)

== Denmark ==
- Niels Siggaard Andersen (Niels Siggaard)
  (in Norway too)
- Peter Andersen
- Per Berg
- Jørn Blach
- Per Christensen
- Ulrik Damm
- Kenneth Daucke Andersen (Kenneth Daucke)
- Oliver Dupont
- Lars Enemark
- Ivan Frederiksen
- Johnny Frederiksen
- Frants Gufler
- Hans Gufler
- Brian Hansen
- Christian Hansen
- Jan Hansen
- Steen Hansen
- Michael Harry
- Troels Harry
- Kenneth Hertsdahl
- Henrik Holtermann
- Christian Thune Jacobsen (Christian Thune-Jacobsen, Christian Thune)
- Henrik Jakobsen
- Bjarne Jensen
- Bo Jensen
- Kenneth Jørgensen (Kenneth Jorgensen, Kenneth Joergensen)
- Mikkel Krause
- Jørn Kristensen (Joern Kristensen, Jorn Kristensen)
- Gert Larsen
- Lasse Lavrsen
- Finn Mikkelsen
- Jan Nebelong (Jan Elgaard Nebelong)
- Preben Nielsen
- Tom Nielsen
- Mads Nørgård
- Oluf Olsen
- Kenneth Ørbæk (Kenneth Oberbaek, Kenneth Oerbaek)
- Joel Ostrowski
- Daniel Poulsen
- Kasper Poulsen
- Mikkel Poulsen
- Mikael Qvist (and in Sweden)
- Ulrik Schmidt
- Michael Sindt
- Anders Søderblom
- Oliver Rosenkrands Søe (Oliver Søe, Soee, Soe)
- Rasmus Stjerne
- Thomas Stjerne
- Carsten Svensgaard (Svensgård)
- Morten Berg Thomsen
- Tobias Thune (Tobias Thune Jacobsen)
- Lars Vilandt
- Kasper Wiksten
- Jane Bidstrup
- Lene Bidstrup
- Astrid Birnbaum
- Helena Blach Lavrsen
- Ivana Bratic
- Charlotte Clemmensen
- Isabella Clemmensen
- Denise Dupont
- Madeleine Dupont
- Jeanne Ellegaard
- Lillian Frøhling
- Christine Grønbech (Christine Groenbech, Christine Svensen)
- Mathilde Halse
- Ane Håkansson Hansen
- Julie Høgh
- Dorthe Holm
- Avijaja Lund Järund
- Angelina Jensen
- Camilla Jensen
- Helene Jensen
- Karolina Jensen (Karolina Legaard Jensen)
- Kirsten Jensen (curler)
- Rosita Jensen (Ingerlise Rosita Jensen)
- Lina Almind Knudsen
- Malene Krause
- Lone Kristoffersen
- Jasmin Lander
- Gitte Larsen
- Iben Larsen
- My Larsen (My Hollinger, My Hollinger Larsen)
- Mette de Neergaard
- Lene Nielsen
- Jette Olsen
- Sussie Pedersen
- Pernille Pirchert
- Margit Pörtner
- Maria Poulsen
- Gabriella Qvist
- Marianne Qvist
- Trine Qvist
- Lisa Richardson
- Stephanie Risdal (Stephanie Nielsen, Stephanie Risdal Nielsen)
- Helle Simonsen
- Susanne Slotsager

== England ==
- Phil Atherton
- Alistair Burns
- Ken Dickson (in SCO too)
- Ben Fowler
- Neil Hardie
- Andrew Hemming
- Bob Martin
- Ewan Park
- Dave Quarrie
- Jotham Sugden
- Noel Thomas
- Ian Wakenshaw
- Stephen Watt
- George Windram
- Lisa Farnell
- Janette Forrest (Jeanette Forrest)
- Anna Fowler
- Sára Jahodová (Sara Jahodova) (in CZE too)
- Joan Reed
- Lana Watson (she's in Manitoba too)

== Estonia ==
- Leo Jakobson
- Marie Kaldvee (Turmann)
- Erkki Lill
- Harri Lill
- Martin Lill
- Heili Grossmann
- Kerli Laidsalu
- Kristiine Lill
- Maile Mölder
- Liisa Turmann
- Erika Tuvike

== Finland ==
- Tuomo Aarnikka
- Jori Aro
- Kasper Hakunti
- Tommi Häti
- Juhani Heinonen
- Vesa Hellman
- Pauli Jäämies
- Yrjö Jääskeläinen
- Jarmo Jokivalli
- Markku Karjalainen
- Aku Kauste
- Kalle Kiiskinen
- Vesa Kokko
- Paavo Kuosmanen
- Osku Kuutamo
- Jari Laukkanen
- Vesa Leppänen
- Raimo Lind
- Wille Mäkelä
- Leo Ouni (Mäkelä)
- Juha Pekaristo
- Perttu Piilo
- Janne Pitko
- Marko Poikolainen
- Jermu Pöllänen (Pollanen, Poellaenen)
- Tomi Rantamäki
- Jari Rouvinen
- Pekka Saarelainen
- Teemu Salo
- Markus Sipilä
- Jani Sullanmaa
- Tony Träskelin (Tony Traskelin, Tony Traeskelin)
- Petri Tsutsunen
- Jussi Uusipaavalniemi
- Markku Uusipaavalniemi
- Jouni Weckman
- Jaana Hämäläinen
- Mari Hansen
- Milja Hellsten
- Marjo Hippi
- Heidi Hossi
- Lotta Immonen
- Kirsi Jeskanen
- Jaana Jokela (Jaana Häkkinen)
- Eszter Juhász
- Sari Karjalainen
- Oona Kauste
- Katja Kiiskinen
- Taru Kivinen
- Anne Malmi (Anne Eerikäinen)
- Mina Mojtahedi
- Sanna Puustinen
- Jenni Räsänen
- Maija Salmiovirta
- Riitta Särösalo
- Elina Virtaala

== France ==
- Georges André
- Tony Angiboust
- Armand Bénédic
- Christophe Boan
- Pierre Boan
- Alain Bozon
- Alain Brangi
- Pierre Canivet
- Philippe Caux
- Julien Charlet
- Wilfrid Coulot
- Henri Cournollet
- Pierre Duclos
- Jan Ducroz
- Richard Ducroz
- Thomas Dufour
- Christian Dupont-Roc (also in NED)
- Dominique Dupont-Roc
- Claude Feige
- Laurent Flenghi
- Jérémy Frarier
- Joel Indergand
- Eric Laffin
- André Mabboux
- Raphael Mathieu
- Thierry Mercier
- Daniel Moratelli
- Spencer Mugnier
- Henri Müller
- Gérard Natter
- Jean-Francois Orset
- Gérard Pasquier
- Amaury Pernette
- Patrick Philippe
- Cyrille Prunet
- Gerard Ravello
- Lionel Roux
- Jean Albert Sulpice
- Lionel Tournier
- André Tronc
- Jocelyn Cault-Lhenry (Jocelyn Lhenry)
- Solène Coulot
- Andrée Dupont-Roc
- Géraldine Girod
- Manon Humbert
- Pauline Jeanneret
- Huguette Jullien
- Brigitte Lamy
- Catherine Lefebvre (curler)
- Agnès Mercier
- Annick Mercier
- Sandrine Morand
- Paulette Sulpice (Paulette Delachat)

== Germany ==
- Oliver Axnick
- Christopher Bartsch
- Alexander Baumann
- Jürgen Beck
- Martin Beiser
- Rainer Beiter
- Hans-Joachim Burba
- Wolfgang Burba
- Hans-Christoph Daase (Christoph Daase)
- Jörg Engesser
- Helmar Erlewein
- Andreas Feldenkirchen
- Jens Gäbel (Jens Gaebel, Jens Gabel)
- Sven Goldemann
- Dominik Greindl
- Klaudius Harsch
- Daniel Herberg
- Markus Herberg
- Patrick Hoffman
- Holger Höhne
- Dirk Hornung
- Alexander Huchel
- Hansjörg Jacoby
- Peter Jacoby
- Jens Jäger (Jens Jaeger, Jens Jager)
- John Jahr
- Roland Jentsch
- Klaus Kanz
- Andy Kapp
- Benjamin Kapp (Benny Kapp)
- Charlie Kapp
- Uli Kapp
- Andreas Kempf
- Hans Dieter Kiesel
- Stephan Knoll
- Dieter Kolb
- Andreas Lang
- Peder Ledosquet
- Sebastian Linkemann
- Heiner Martin
- Bernhard Mayr
- Wolf Meissner (Wolf Meißner)
- Felix Messenzehl
- Markus Messenzehl
- Marc Muskatewitz
- Daniel Neuner
- Harry Pavel
- Manfred Räderer
- Peter Rickmers
- Daniel Rothballer
- Sven Saile
- Michael Schäffer
- Johannes Scheuerl
- Martin Schlitt
- Rodger Gustaf Schmidt
- Rainer Schöpp
- Björn Schröder (in SUI too)
- Felix Schulze
- Sebastian Schweizer
- Ryan Sherrard (in New Brunswick too)
- Marcus Sieger
- Sebastian Stock
- Joshua Sutor
- Magnus Sutor
- Uli Sutor
- Sixten Totzek
- Mario Trevisiol
- Manuel Walter
- Keith Wendorf
- Florian Zörgiebel (in SUI too)
- Emira Abbes
- Claudia Beer
- Maike Beer
- Sabine Belkofer
- Jane Boake-Cope
- Josefine Einsle
- Suzanne Fink
- Karin Fischer
- Klara-Hermine Fomm
- Michaela Greif
- Barbara Haller
- Christina Haller
- Almut Hege-Schöll
- Stella Heiß
- Astrid Hoer
- Mia Höhne
- Sabine Huth
- Analena Jentsch
- Christiane Jentsch
- Daniela Jentsch
- Lena Kapp
- Susi Kiesel
- Elisabeth Ländle
- Stephanie Mayr
- Carina Meidele
- Heike Melchior
- Nicole Muskatewitz
- Natalie Nessler
- Josephine Obermann
- Imogen Oona Lehmann
- Christiane Putzich (Christiane Steger)
- Ina Räderer
- Melanie Robillard
- Stefan Rossler (Steffi)
- Pia-Lisa Schöll
- Corinna Scholz
- Andrea Schöpp
- Elinore Schöpp
- Heike Schwaller
- Katja Schweizer (Katja Weisser)
- Andrea Stock
- Janet Strayer
- Caren Totzauer
- Marika Trettin
- Petra Tschetsch
- Monika Wagner
- Sabine Weber

== Hong Kong ==
- Jason Chang
- Ling-Yue Hung
- Julie Morrison

== Hungary ==
- Lajos Belleli
- Zsolt Kiss
- György Nagy
- Zoltan Palancsa (Zoltán)
- Alexandra Beres
- Dorottya Palancsa
- Ildikó Szekeres
- Ágnes Szentannai

== Ireland ==
- Douglas Dryburgh
- Robin Gray (in SCO too)
- Johnjo Kenny (John Jo Kenny, John Kenny) (in SCO too)
- Peter Wilson
- Peter J.D. Wilson (in SCO too)

== Israel ==
- Leonid Rivkind (in RUS too)

== Italy ==
- Enrico Alberti
- Fabio Alverà (Alvera)
- Massimo Alverà (Alvera)
- Sebastiano Arman
- Diego Bombassei
- Valter Bombassei
- Giacomo Colli
- Giorgio Da Rin
- Giuseppe Dal Molin
- Gabriele Dallapiccola
- Orazio Fagone
- Daniele Ferrazza
- Stefano Ferronato
- Pierino Gaspard
- Julien Genre
- Renato Ghezze
- Mattia Giovanella
- Alessio Gonin
- Simone Gonin
- Gianluca Lorenzi
- Mauro Maino
- Egidio Marchese
- Marco Mariani
- Antonio Menardi
- Stefano Morona
- Amos Mosaner
- Andrea Pavani
- Enea Pavani
- Claudio Pescia
- Andrea Pilzer
- Alberto Pimpini
- Joël Retornaz
- Fabio Ribotta
- Franco Sovilla
- Emanuele Spelorzi
- Stefano Spiller
- Andrea Tabanelli
- Fabio Tripodi
- Giancarlo Valt
- Gianpaolo Zandegiacomo (Gian Paolo Zandegiacomo)
- Davide Zandiegiacomo
- Davide Zanotelli
- Silvio Zanotelli
- Alessandro Zisa (Carlo Alessandro Zisa)
- Claudia Alverà (Alvera)
- Eleonora Alverà (Alvera)
- Nella Alverà (Alvera)
- Federica Apollonio
- Giorgia Apollonio
- Violetta Caldart
- Alice Cobelli
- Elettra de Col
- Stefania Constantini
- Rita Dal Monte
- Elena Dami
- Diana Gaspari
- Maria Gaspari
- Veronica Gerbi
- Camilla Gilberti
- Giulia Lacedelli
- Maria-Grazzia Lacedelli (Maria Grazia Lacedelli, Maria-Grazzia Constantini, Maria Grazzia Constantini)
- Marta Lo Deserto
- Arianna Losano
- Rebecca Mariani
- Elena Mathis (in SUI too)
- Angela Menardi
- Stefania Menardi
- Chiara Olivieri
- Denise Pimpini
- Rosa Pompanin
- Giorgia Ricca
- Angela Romei
- Federica Trota
- Veronica Zappone
- Giulia Zardini Lacedelli

== Japan ==
- Shinya Abe
- Kosuke Aita
- Go Aoki
- Yutaka Aoyama
- Ryosuke Haneishi
- Takashi Hidai
- Yuji Hirama
- Kohsuke Hirata
- Katsuo Ichikawa
- Takanori Ichimura
- Kazuhiko Ikawa
- Yuki Inoue
- Ryuya Ishigaki
- Masaki Iwai
- Hiroaki Kashiwagi
- Satoshi Koizumi
- Hirofumi Kudo (Hirofumi Kudoh, Hirofumi Kudō, Hirohumi Kudo)
- Yuta Matsumura
- Kosuke Morozumi
- Yusuke Morozumi
- Asei Nakahara
- Yoji Nakajima
- Hisaaki Nakamine (Toshiaki Nakamine)
- Jun Nakayama
- Koji Nisato
- Kumiko Ogihara
- Ryo Ogihara
- Yoshiyuki Ohmiya
- Haruto Ouchi
- Tsuyoshi Ryutaki
- Hiroshi Sato
- Keita Satoh
- Yuki Sawamukai
- Yusaku Shibaya
- Tetsuro Shimizu
- Yoshiro Shimizu
- Ryotaro Shukuya
- Momoha Tabata
- Yasumasa Tanida
- Kenji Tomabechi
- Makoto Tsuruga
- Sota Tsuruga
- Katsuji Uchibori
- Shingo Usui
- Toru Utumi
- Tsuyoshi Yamaguchi
- Takeru Yamamoto
- Kazuto Yanagizawa
- Keita Yanagizawa
- Riku Yanagisawa
- Satsuki Fujisawa
- Yumie Funayama
- Miyo Ichikawa
- Rina Ida
- Mao Ishigaki
- Hasumi Ishigooka
- Kotomi Ishizaki
- Ayami Ito
- Asuka Kanai
- Mizuki Kitaguchi
- Ikue Kitazawa
- Tori Koana
- Mina Kobayashi
- Mika Konaka (Mika Hori)
- Yukari Kondo (Yukari Kondō, Yukari Kondou)
- Arisa Kotani
- Yuna Kotani
- Midori Kudoh (Minori Kudoh, Midori Kudo, Minori Kudo, Minori Kudou, Minori Kudō)
- Chiaki Matsumura
- Moe Meguro
- Yoko Mimura (Yōko Mimura, Youko Mimura)
- Mari Motohashi
- Seina Nakajima
- Miku Nihira
- Akemi Niwa
- Ayumi Ogasawara
- Aki Ogawa
- Eri Ogihara
- Mayumi Ohkutsu (Mayumi Okutsu, Mayumi Ōkutsu, Mayumi Seguchi, Mayumi Seguchi-Ohkutsu)
- Anna Ohmiya
- Kaho Onodera
- Mone Ryokawa
- Ayako Saitoh
- Miyuki Satoh
- Akiko Sekiwa (Akiko Katoh, Akiko Kato)
- Emi Shimizu
- Minori Suzuki
- Yumi Suzuki
- Sakurako Terada
- Michiko Tomabechi
- Miyu Ueno
- Yui Ueno
- Mayo Yamaura
- Chinami Yoshida
- Yurika Yoshida
- Sayaka Yoshimura

== Kazakhstan ==
- Viktor Kim
- Aleksandr Orlov (curler) (Alexander, Alexandr) (in RUS too)
- Abylaikhan Zhuzbay
- Sitora Alliyarova
- Angelina Ebauyer

== South Korea ==
- Ahn Jae-sung
- Beak Jong-chul (Baek Jong-chul)
- Cha Jae-goan
- Cha Jin-ho
- Cho Yang-hyun
- Choi Min-suk
- Ham Dong-hee
- Hwang Hyeon-jun
- Jeon Jae-ik
- Jeong Byeong-jin
- Jeong Yeong-seok
- Kim Chang-min
- Kim Eun-bin
- Kim Hak-kyun
- Kim Hak-sung
- Kim Hyo-jun
- Kim Jeong-min
- Kim Jin-hun
- Kim Jong-pan
- Kim Kab-seung
- Kim Min-chan
- Kim Min-woo
- Kim Myung-jin
- Kim Soo-hyuk
- Kim Tae-hwan
- Ko Seung-wan
- Kwon Young-il
- Lee Dong-ha
- Lee Dong-hyeong
- Lee Dong-Keun
- Lee Jae-ho
- Lee Jeong-jae
- Lee Jun-hyung
- Lee Ki-bok
- Lee Ki-jeong
- Lee Ye-jun
- Moon Si-woo
- Nam Yoon-ho
- Oh Eun-su
- Oh Seung-hoon
- Park Jae-cheol
- Park Jong-duk
- Park Kil-woo
- Park Kwon-il
- Park Se-won
- Pyo Jeong-min
- Seo Min-guk
- Seo Soon-seok
- Seong Ji-hoon
- Seong Se-hyeon
- Yang Se-young
- Yoo Min-hyeon
- Bang Min-ja
- Cho Yae-lee
- Gim Eun-ji
- Ha Seung-youn
- Jang Hye-ji
- Jung Young-a
- Kang Bo-bae
- Kang Oe-jeong
- Kim Cho-hi
- Kim Eun-jung
- Kim Hye-rin
- Kim Ji-sun
- Kim Ji-yoon
- Kim Kyeong-ae
- Kim Mi-yeon
- Kim Min-ji
- Kim Min-jung
- Kim Seon-yeong
- Kim Su-ji
- Kim Su-jin
- Kim Yeong-mi
- Lee Hyun-jung
- Lee Seul-bee
- Oh Eun-jin
- Park Ji-hyun
- Park Kyung-mi
- Seol Ye-eun
- Seol Ye-ji
- Shin Mi-sung
- Um Min-ji
- Yang Tae-i
- Yeom Yoon-jung
- Yun Hee-keong

== Latvia ==
- Ritvars Gulbis
- Agris Lasmans
- Ansis Regža
- Kārlis Smilga
- Arnis Veidemanis
- Daina Barone
- Evelīna Barone
- Ieva Bērziņa
- Zanda Bikše
- Santa Blumberga
- Una Ģērmane
- Ieva Krusta
- Iluta Linde
- Žaklīna Litauniece
- Dace Munča
- Dace Regža
- Evita Regža
- Poļina Rožkova (Polina Rozkova)
- Ieva Rudzīte
- Tīna Siliņa
- Iveta Staša-Šaršūne

== Lithuania ==
- Tadas Vyskupaitis
- Rūta Blažienė (Ruta Blaziene)
- Olga Dvojeglazova
- Miglė Kiudytė (Migle Kiudyte)
- Justina Lenortavičiūtė - look at Justina Zalieckienė
- Virginija Paulauskaitė (Virginija Paulauskaite)
- Justina Zalieckienė (Justina Zalieckiene, Justina Lenortavičiūtė, Justina Lenortaviciute)

== Netherlands ==
- Reinier Butöt
- Steven van der Cammen
- Jeroen van Dillewijn
- Jaap van Dorp
- Christian Dupont-Roc (also in FRA)
- Carlo Glasbergen
- Wouter Gösgens
- Laurens Hoekman
- Tobias van den Hurk
- Floris van Imhoff
- Gustaf van Imhoff
- Bart Klomp
- Alexander Magan
- Wim Neeleman
- Christiaan Offringa
- Mark Rurup
- Rob Vilain
- Reg Wiebe
- Ben Wiegers
- Lisenka Bomas
- Idske de Jong
- Erika Doornbos
- Laura van Imhoff
- Shari Leibbrandt-Demmon
- Marlijn Müller
- Vanessa Tonoli (also in SUI)
- Ellen van der Cammen
- Elisabeth Veening
- Margrietha Voskuilen

== New Zealand ==
- Jim Allan (in AUS too)
- Peter Becker
- Scott Becker
- Sean Becker
- Peter de Boer
- John Campbell
- Darren Carson
- Lorne De Pape
- Warren Dobson
- Phil Dowling
- Hans Frauenlob
- Anton Hood
- Stewart McKnight
- Dan Mustapic
- Brett Sargon
- Ben Smith
- Kenny Thomson
- Hunter Walker
- Eleanor Adviento
- Bridget Becker
- Natalie Campbell - look at Natalie Thurlow
- Mhairi-Bronté Duncan
- Marisa Jones
- Ruby Kinney
- Courtney Smith
- Jessica Smith (Jess)
- Holly Thompson
- Natalie Thurlow (Natalie Campbell)

== Norway ==
- Niels Siggaard Andersen (Niels Siggaard)
  (in Denmark too)
- Tormod Andreassen
- Bo Bakke
- Kjell Berg
- Knut Bjaanaes
- Mathias Brænden (Braenden, Branden)
- Peter Dahlman
- Per Dammen
- Flemming Davanger
- Thomas Due
- Anthon Grimsmo
- Stig-Arne Gunnestad
- Morten Halsa
- Andreas Hårstad (Andreas Harstad, Andreas Haarstad)
- Thoralf Hognestad
- Markus Høiberg
- Johan Høstmælingen (Johan Hostmælingen, Johan Høstmaelingen, Johan Hostmaelingen, Johan Hostmaehlingen)
- Ole Ingvaldsen
- Niclas Järund
- Paul Aksel Johansen
- Sven Kroken
- Espen de Lange
- Rolf Andreas Lauten
- Alexander Lindström
- Dagfinn Loen
- Sjur Loen
- Rune Lorentsen
- Thomas Løvold
- Terje Lyshaug
- Gunnar Meland
- Michael Mellemseter
- Steffen Mellemseter
- Eirik Mjøen (Mjoen, Mjoeen)
- Knut Ivar Moe
- Jørgen Myran
- Wilhelm Næss (Naess, Willhelm)
- Magnus Nedregotten
- Gaute Nepstad
- Torger Nergård
- Havard Vad Petersson
- Terje Rafdal
- Bendik Ramsfjell
- Bent Ånund Ramsfjell
- Eigil Ramsfjell
- Harald Ramsfjell
- Magnus Ramsfjell
- Sander Rølvåg
- Martin Sesaker
- Morten Skaug
- Geir Arne Skogstad
- Morten Søgaard
- Kristian Sørum
- Morten Sørum
- Jostein Stordahl
- Helmer Strømbo
- Christoffer Svae
- Ole Fredrik Syversen
- Jan Thoresen
- Tore Torvbråten
- Pål Trulsen
- Kjell Ulrichsen
- Thomas Ulsrud
- Lars Vågberg
- Magnus Vågberg
- Steffen Walstad
- Marianne Aspelin
- Ingrid Claussen (Camilla Claussen)
- Kristine Davanger
- Trine Fissum
- Ingeborg Forbregd
- Alvhild Fugelmo
- Ellen Githmark
- Ingvill Githmark (Ingvild Githmark)
- Linn Githmark
- Liv Grøseth
- Mette Halvorsen
- Marianne Haslum
- Bente Hoel
- Camilla Holth
- Charlotte Hovring
- Rikke Iversen
- Anne Jøtun
- Hilde Jøtun
- Eirin Mesloe
- Julie Kjær Molnar
- Eilin Kjærland
- Sissel Løchen
- Henriette Løvar
- Dordi Nordby
- Mille Haslev Nordbye
- Nora Østgård
- Maia Ramsfjell
- Gry Roaldseth
- Martine Rønning
- Marianne Rørvik
- Anne Mette Samdal
- Anneline Skårsmoen
- Kristin Skaslien
- Else Skogan
- Elisabeth Skogen
- Billie Sørum (Billie Skjerpen)
- Ingrid Stensrud
- Cecilie Torhaug
- Kristin Tøsse Løvseth
- Pia Trulsen
- Trine Trulsen
- Lene Tystad
- Åse Vanvik
- Eva Vanvik
- Grethe Wolan
- Hanne Woods

== Poland ==
- Kasia Selwant

== Romania ==
- Allen Coliban

== Russia ==
- Dmitry Abanin (Dmitri, Dmitriy)
- Artur Ali
- Evgeniy Arkhipov
- Anton Batugin
- Valeriy Chepilko
- Vitaly Danilov
- Petr Dron
- Andrey Drozdov
- Alexander Eremin
- Victor Ershov
- Timur Gadzhikhanov
- Sergey Glukhov
- Daniil Goriachev
- Vasily Gudin
- Anton Kalalb
- Alexey Kamnev (Alexei, Aleksey, Aleksei)
- Alexander Kirikov (Aleksandr)
- Evgeny Klimov
- Aleksandr Kozyrev
- Oleg Krasikov
- Alexander Krushelnitskiy
- Alexey Kulikov
- Konstantin Kurokhtin
- Roman Kutuzov
- Nikolay Melnikov
- Andrei Meshcheryakov
- Dmitry Mironov
- Oleg Narinyan
- Aleksandr Orlov (curler) (Alexander, Alexandr) (in KAZ too)
- Artur Razhabov
- Leonid Rivkind (in ISR too)
- Marat Romanov
- Alexander Shevchenko
- Artem Shmakov
- Andrey Smirnov
- Alexey Stukalskiy
- Vasily Telezhkin
- Alexey Timofeev
- Alexey Tselousov
- Mikhail Vaskov
- Olga Andrianova
- Galina Arsenkina
- Anastasia Bryzgalova
- Maria Duyunova (Mariia Duiunova)
- Nkeiruka Ezekh
- Margarita Fomina
- Ekaterina Galkina
- Nina Golovtchenko
- Julia Guzieva
- Olga Jarkova
- Anna Karpushina
- Irina Kolesnikova
- Maria Komarova
- Alina Kovaleva
- Ekaterina Kuzmina
- Victoria Moiseeva
- Anastasia Moskaleva
- Yana Nekrasova
- Svetlana Pakhomova
- Yulia Portunova
- Liudmila Privivkova
- Alexandra Raeva
- Vlada Rumiantseva
- Anna Samoylik
- Daria Shchukina
- Anna Sidorova
- Anastassia Skoultan
- Oxana Slesarenko
- Tatiana Smirnova
- Angela Tuvaeva (Anzhela Tyuvaeva)
- Uliana Vasilyeva

== Saudi Arabia ==
- Suleiman Alaqel

== Scotland ==
- Graeme Adam
- Hugh Aitken
- Sandy Anderson
- Scott Andrews
- D G Astley
- Leslie Balfour-Melville
- Colin Barr
- Colin Baxter
- Iain Baxter
- Brian Binnie
- Ronald Brewster
- Tom Brewster
- Norman Brown
- George Bryan
- Angus Bryce
- Cameron Bryce
- John Bryden
- Robin Brydone
- Euan Byers
- Allan Cameron
- Jim Cannon
- Robert Christie
- Graeme Connal
- Graham Cormack
- Bob Cowan (curler) (Robert A. Cowan)
- James Craik
- Peter de Boer
- Michael Dick (W. Michael Dick, Mike Dick)
- Ken Dickson (in ENG too)
- Richard Dickson
- Trevor Dodds (curler)
- Keith Douglas
- Greg Drummond
- Douglas Dryburgh
- James Dryburgh
- Leonard Dudman
- Frank Duffy
- David Edwards
- James Elliott
- Gregor Ewan
- Duncan Fernie
- Jim Forrest
- Willie Frame
- Jim Gault
- Alan Glen
- Michael Goodfellow
- Logan Gray
- Robin Gray (in IRL too)
- Ruairidh Greenwood
- George Haggart
- Colin Hamilton
- Jimmy Hamilton
- Neil Hampton
- Alan Hannah
- Grant Hardie
- Richard Harding
- Alex Harvey
- Blair Haswell
- Chuck Hay
- David Hay
- Mike Hay
- Barton Henderson
- Bill Henderson
- Greig Henderson
- Ross Hepburn
- Ken Horton
- Billy Howat
- David Howie
- Laurence Jackson
- Willie Jackson
- Willie Jamieson
- Russell Keiller
- Robert Kelly
- Johnjo Kenny (John Jo Kenny, John Kenny) (in IRL too)
- Tom Killin
- Fraser Kingan
- Robert Kirkland (Bobby)
- Euan Kyle
- Bobby Lammie
- Gary Logan
- Peter Loudon
- Allan Lyburn
- William Lyburn
- Ewan MacDonald
- Michael McCreadie
- Duncan McFadzean
- Tom McGregor (Tom MacGregor)
- Willie McIntosh
- Roger McIntyre
- Michael McKenzie
- Andrew McLaren
- Hammy McMillan (Sr.)
- Hammy McMillan Jr.
- Bob McPherson
- Andrew McQuistin
- David Melrose
- Murray Melville
- Duncan Menzies
- Jim Miller
- Vic Moran
- Kenny More
- Bruce Mouat
- Bill Muirhead
- Glen Muirhead
- Gordon Muirhead
- Thomas Muirhead
- David Murdoch
- Neil Murdoch
- Tom Murray
- Ronnie Napier
- Hugh Neilson
- Hugh Nibloe
- Ross Paterson
- John Pearson
- Tom Pendreigh
- David Ramsay
- David Reid (Dave Reid)
- T. S. Robertson-Aikman
- James Sanderson
- Willie Sanderson
- Derek Scott
- Jimmy Scott
- James Sellar (Jim)
- Alistair Sinclair
- Roy Sinclair
- Cameron Smith
- David Smith
- Kyle Smith
- Peter Smith
- Warwick Smith
- Bob Stirrat
- Ricky Tasker
- Alex A. Torrance
- Alex F. Torrance
- Craig Waddell
- Jimmy Waddell
- Kyle Waddell
- Mark Watt
- Robin Welsh
- Ross Whyte
- Andrew Wilson
- Craig Wilson
- Peter J.D. Wilson (in IRL too)
- Phil Wilson
- Alex Young
- Bobby Young
- Willie Young
- Tom Yuill
- Watson Yuill
- Tony Zummack
- Kay Adams
- Karen Addison
- Gina Aitken
- Marion Armour
- Kerry Barr
- Fiona Bayne (Felsie)
- Wendy Bell
- Naomi Brown
- Tara Brown
- Helen Caird
- Kate Caithness
- Lynn Cameron
- Christine Cannon
- Vicki Chalmers
- Lisa Davie
- Jennifer Dodds
- Sheena Drummie
- Hailey Duff
- Hazel Erskine (McGregor)
- Katriona Fairweather
- Hannah Fleming
- Henrietta Gilmour
- Lauren Gray
- Carol Hamilton
- Claire Hamilton
- Isobel Hannen
- Rachel Hannen
- Sheila Harvey
- Kirsty Hay (Addison)
- Fay Henderson
- Carolyn Hutchison
- Sophie Jackson
- Jeanette Johnston
- Deborah Knox
- Anne Laird
- Betty Law
- Beth Lindsay
- Elaine Lister
- Jackie Lockhart
- Edith Loudon
- Katie Loudon
- Fiona MacDonald
- Rhiann Macleod
- Angie Malone
- Rhona Martin
- Ann McKellar
- Katie McMillan
- Barbara McPake (Barbara McFarlane)
- Claire Milne
- Mairi Milne
- Julie Morrison
- Rebecca Morrison
- Margaret Morton
- Billie-May Muirhead
- Eve Muirhead
- Nancy Murdoch
- Aileen Neilson
- Elizabeth Paterson-Brown
- Janice Rankin
- Sarah Reid
- Margaret Richardson
- Isobel Ross
- Jane Sanderson
- Kelly Schafer
- Rachael Simms
- Bea Sinclair
- Sophie Sinclair
- Anna Sloan
- Mili Smith
- Alice Spence
- Jayne Stirling
- Sheila Swan
- May Taylor
- Isobel Torrance
- Lorna Vevers
- Isobel Waddell
- Laura Watt
- Jessie Whiteford
- Helen Williams
- Margaret Wiseman
- Lindsay Wood
- Vicky Wright

== Serbia ==
- Đorđe Nešković

== Slovakia ==
- Radoslav Ďuriš
- Branislav Jakubec
- Imrich Lyócsa
- Dušan Pitoňák
- František Pitoňák
- Pavol Pitoňák
- Peter Zaťko
- Alena Kánová
- Monika Kunkelová

== Spain ==
- Martin Rios
- Mikel Unanue
- Sergio Vez (Sergio Vez Labrador)
- Ana Arce
- Irantzu Garcia (Irantzu Garcia Vez)
- Oihane Otaegi
- Melanie Robillard

== Sweden ==
- Göran Åberg
- Robin Ahlberg
- Johan Petter Åhlén
- Totte Åkerlund
- Emanuel Allberg (Manne)
- Bo Andersson
- Rolf Arfwidsson
- Per Axelsson
- Niklas Berggren
- Tom Berggren
- Erik Berglöf
- Roy Berglöf
- Björn Brandberg
- Roger Bredin
- Olle Brudsten
- Karl-Erik Bruneflod (Ecke)
- Ken Bruneflod
- Patrik Burman
- Claes-Göran Carlman (Bo Carlman)
- Eric Carlsén
- Nils Carlsén
- Per Carlsén
- Göran Carlsson
- Joakim Carlsson
- Sven Carlsson
- Bengt Cederwall
- Peter Cederwall
- Lars Dracke
- James Dryburgh
- Kjell Edfalk
- Niklas Edin
- Sven Eklund
- Tony Eng
- Lars Engblom
- Mats-Ola Engborg
- Anders Eriksson (b. 1982)
- Dan-Ola Eriksson
- Markus Eriksson
- Oskar Eriksson
- Peter Eriksson
- Gustav Eskilsson
- Marcus Feldt
- Peder Flemström
- Joakim Flyg
- Peder Folke
- Sven Fryksenius
- Håkan Funk
- Olle Gewalt
- Anders Gidlund
- Anders Grahn
- Sören Grahn
- Kjell Grengmark
- Lars-Erik Håkansson
- Olle Håkansson
- Patric Håkansson (Patric Klaremo)
- Stig Håkansson
- Thomas Håkansson (in Nova Scotia too)
- Fredrik Hallström
- Rickard Hallström
- Marcus Hasselborg
- Mikael Hasselborg
- Stefan Hasselborg
- Henrik Holmberg
- Stefan Holmén
- Börje Holmgren
- Claes Hultling
- Ove Ingels
- Örjan Jonsson
- Niklas Järund
- Christer Källén
- Claes Källén
- Patrik Kallin
- Axel Kamp
- Ragnar Kamp
- Viktor Kjäll
- Bengt af Kleen
- Anders Kraupp
- Sebastian Kraupp
- Gunnar Kullendorf
- Gustav Larsson
- Henrik Leek
- Fredrik Lindberg
- Per Lindeman
- Sture Lindén
- Lars Lindgren
- Peja Lindholm
- Alexander Lindström
- Kristian Lindström
- Mikael Ljungberg
- Anders Lööf
- Joakim Mabergs (Joakim Carlsson)
- Mathias Mabergs (Mathias Carlsson)
- Mats Mabergs
- Patric Mabergs
- Daniel Magnusson
- Christer Mårtensson
- Peter Narup
- Jan-Olov Nässén
- Peter Nenzén
- Anders Nilsson (Ante)
- Mikael Norberg
- Hans Nordin
- Tomas Nordin
- Lars-Åke Nordström
- Per Noreen
- Thomas Norgren
- Mats O. Nyberg (b. Sep 5, 1958)
- Fredrik Nyman
- Christer Ödling
- Ture Ödlund
- Svante Ödman
- Tommy Olin
- Mats Olofsson
- Simon Olofsson
- Bengt Oscarius
- Kjell Oscarius
- Connie Östlund
- Flemming Patz
- Johannes Patz
- Ronny Persson
- Viljo Petersson-Dahl
- Andreas Prytz
- Daniel Prytz
- Mikael Qvist (and in Denmark)
- Fred Ridderstad
- Björn Roxin
- Claes Roxin
- Göran Roxin
- Lars-Eric Roxin
- Björn Rudström
- Håkan Rudström
- Sigurd Rydén
- Per Ivar Rydgren
- Tore Rydman
- Anton Sandström
- Leif Sätter
- Tom Schaeffer
- Erik Severin
- Axel Sjöberg
- Bernt Sjöberg
- Jonas Sjölander
- Hans Söderström
- Ove Söderström
- Håkan Ståhlbro
- Arne Stern
- Jan Strandlund
- Lars Strandqvist
- Christoffer Sundgren
- Roger Svanberg
- Magnus Swartling
- Leif Sätter
- Daniel Tenn
- Anders Thidholm
- Jan Ullsten
- Carl von Wendt
- Lars Wernblom
- Christer Wessel
- Thomas Wilhelm
- Bob Woods
- Mats Wranå
- Rasmus Wranå
- Vilma Åhlström
- Ulrika Åkerberg
- Eva Andersson
- Ingrid Appelquist
- Barbro Arfwidsson
- Inga Arfwidsson
- Bitte Berg
- Gunilla Bergman
- Ulrika Bergman
- Kajsa Bergström
- Christina Bertrup
- Catrin Bitén
- Gunvor Björhäll
- Mait Bjurström
- Anna Blom
- Astrid Blomberg
- Mia Boman (Maria Bowman, Maria "Mia" Zackrisson)
- Elisabeth Branäs
- Anneli Burman
- Sara Carlsson
- Anna Domeij
- Moa Dryburgh
- Helen Edlund
- Anne-Marie Ericsson
- Britt-Marie Ericson
- Zandra Flyg
- Lotta Giesenfeld
- Helene Granqvist
- Elisabet Gustafson
- Sofia Gustafsson
- Susanne Gynning-Ödling
- Anna Hasselborg
- Maria Hasselborg
- Johanna Heldin
- Marie Henriksson
- Elisabeth Högström
- Katarina Hultling
- Monika Jansson
- Helene Jonsson
- Annette Jörnlind
- Ann-Catrin Kjerr
- Helena Klange
- Agnes Knochenhauer
- Sabina Kraupp
- Maria Larsson
- Katarina Lässker
- Anna Le Moine (Svärd)
- Liselotta Lennartsson
- Sylvia Liljefors (Malmberg, Malmberg-Liljefors)
- Cathrine Lindahl
- Margaretha Lindahl
- Anna-Kari Lindholm
- Brita Lindholm
- Helena Lingham
- Annika Lööf
- Eva Lund
- Towe Lundman
- Sofia Mabergs
- Lena Mårdberg
- Louise Marmont
- Sofie Marmont
- Sara McManus
- Ingrid Meldahl (Ingrid Thidevall-Meldahl)
- Anette Norberg
- Maud Nordlander
- Camilla Noréen
- Elisabeth Norredahl (Elisabeth Hansson)
- Katarina Nyberg
- Carina Olsson
- Cecilia Östlund
- Elisabeth Persson
- Marie Persson
- Maria Prytz
- Zandra Reppe
- Anna Rindeskog
- Eva Rosenhed
- Karin Rudström
- Birgitta Sewik
- Margaretha Sigfridsson
- Fanny Sjöberg
- Karin Sjögren
- Linda Stenlund
- Birgitta Törn
- Kristina Ulander (Kicki Ulander)
- Almida de Val
- Stina Viktorsson
- Jennie Wåhlin
- Maria Wennerström
- Erika Westman
- Therese Westman
- Isabella Wranå
- Maria "Mia" Zackrisson (look at Mia Bowman)

== Switzerland ==
- Adolf Aerni
- Dominic Andres
- Bernhard Attinger
- Kurt Attinger
- Peter Attinger Jr.
- Ruedi Attinger
- Werner Attinger
- Alex Aufdenblatten
- Jürg Bamert
- Marco Battilana
- Heinz Beutler
- Walter Bielser
- Martin Bieri
- Amédéé Biner
- Bruno Binggeli
- Marcel Bodenmann
- Manfred Bolliger
- Michael Brunner
- Marc Brügger (Brugger, Bruegger)
- Raphael Brütsch
- Urs Bucher
- Fabian Burckhardt
- Hans Burgener
- Cesare Canepa
- Cesare Cassani
- Peter Däppen
- Peter de Cruz
- Jürgen Dick (Jürg Dick)
- Urs Dick
- Peter Eggenschwiler
- Markus Eggler
- Urs Eichhorn
- Lukas Fankhauser
- Rolf Gautschi
- Jürg Geiler
- Simon Gempeler
- Peter Grendelmeier
- Thomas Grendelmeier
- Reto Gribi
- Damian Grichting
- Mario Gross
- Caroline Gruss
- Daniel Gutknecht
- Andreas Hänni (Hanni, Haenni)
- Marc Haudenschild
- Jan Hauser
- Jan Hess
- Yves Hess
- Thomas Hoch
- Stefan Hofer
- Jürg Hornisberger
- Marco Hösli
- Patrick Hürlimann
- Robert Hürlimann
- Rolf Iseli
- Frédéric Jean
- Markus Känzig
- Stefan Karnusian
- Marcel Käufeler (Kaeufeler)
- Anton Kehrli
- Stephan Keiser
- Gerold Keller
- Reto Keller
- Thomas Kläy
- Pablo Lachat
- Hansjörg Lips (Hans-Jörg Lips, Hansjürg Lips, Hansjoerg Lips, Hans-Jürg Lips, Hans Jorg Lips, Hans Juerg Lips)
- Michael Lips
- Thomas Lips
- Patrik Lörtscher
- Lucien Lottenbach
- Felix Luchsinger
- Fritz Luchsinger
- Richard Mähr
- Dominik Märki
- Raphael Märki
- Stefan Maurer
- Romano Meier
- Daniel Meyer
- Sven Michel
- Daniel Model
- Daniel Müller
- Toni Müller
- Ueli Mülli
- Patrick Netzer
- Mattias Neuenschwander
- Werner Oswald
- Alfred Paci
- Claudio Pätz
- Diego Perren
- Claudio Pescia
- Enrico Pfister
- Marc Pfister
- Stephan Pfister
- Jens Piesbergen
- Martin Plüss
- Marco Ramstein
- Stephan Rauch
- Martin Rios
- Martin Romang
- Simon Roth
- Martin Sägesser
- Roland Schneider
- Björn Schröder (in GER too)
- Andreas Schwaller
- Christof Schwaller
- Kim Schwaller
- Yannick Schwaller
- Benoît Schwarz
- Pascal Sieber
- Rico Simen
- Heinz Sommerhalder
- Beat Stephan
- Robert Stettler
- Ralph Stöckli
- Daniel Streiff
- Simon Strübin
- Jürg Studer
- Urs Studer
- Franz Tanner
- Jürg Tanner
- Valentin Tanner
- Stefan Traub
- Tobias Treyer
- Sandro Trolliet
- Felix Wagner
- Theo Welschen
- Bernhard Werthemann
- Daniel Widmer
- Markus Widmer
- Tom Winkelhausen
- Kevin Wunderlin
- Dieter Wüest
- Daniel Wyser
- Reto Ziegler
- Florian Zörgiebel (in GER too)
- Martin Zürrer
- Marlene Albrecht
- Caroline Balz
- Melanie Barbezat
- Silvia Benoit
- Stefanie Berset
- Laurence Bidaud
- Beatrix Blauel-Thomann (Blauel, Blaül, Blaül-Thomann)
- Betty Bourquin
- Corinne Bourquin
- Irene Bürgi
- Gaby Casanova
- Nicole Dünki (Nicole Duenki, Nicole Dunki)
- Luzia Ebnöther
- Laura Engler
- Binia Feltscher
- Marianne Flotron
- Beatrice Frei
- Tanya Frei
- Erika Frewein
- Selina Gafner
- Sandra Gantenbein
- Lisa Gisler
- Janine Greiner
- Michelle Gribi
- Larissa Hari
- Carole Howald
- Janet Hürlimann
- Claudia Hüttenmoser
- Michèle Jäggi
- Franziska Jöhr
- Therese Kämpfer
- Franziska von Känel
- Franziska Kaufmann
- Raphaela Keiser
- Brigitte Kienast
- Flurina Kobler
- Céline Koller
- Manuela Kormann
- Christine Krieg
- Carmen Küng
- Jaqueline Landolt
- Nadine Lehmann
- Cristina Lestander
- Brigitte Leutenegger
- Susanne Luchsinger
- Angela Lutz
- Rosi Manger
- Elena Mathis (in ITA too)
- Barbara Meier
- Sandrine Mercier
- Barbara Meyer
- Michèle Moser
- Erika Müller
- Esther Neuenschwander
- Silvia Obrist
- Mirjam Ott
- Alina Pätz
- Jenny Perret
- Gisela Peter
- Katrin Peterhans
- Annina von Planta
- Sandra Ramstein-Attinger (Sandra Attinger, Sandra Ramstein)
- Fabienne Rieder
- Nadia Röthlisberger-Raspe
- Caroline Rück
- Evi Rüegsegger
- Daniela Rupp
- Selina Rychiger
- Carmen Schäfer
- Susan Schlapbach
- Ursula Schlapbach
- Irene Schori
- Nicole Schwägli
- Xenia Schwaller
- Briar Schwaller-Hürlimann
- Manuela Siegrist
- Valeria Spälty
- Elena Stern
- Nicole Strausak
- Linda Thommen
- Silvana Tirinzoni
- Vanessa Tonoli (also in SUI)
- Claudia Tosse
- Marianne Uhlmann
- Christine Urech
- Madeleine Wildi
- Marisa Winkelhausen
- Cristina Wirz
- Selina Witschonke

== Turkey ==
- Turan Akalın
- Bilal Ömer Çakır
- Muhammet Haydar Demirel
- Alican Karatas
- Faruk Kavaz
- Muhammed Zeki Uçan (Ucan)
- Muhammet Oǧuz Zengin
- Orhun Yüce
- İfayet Şafak Çalıkuşu
- Ayşe Gözütok
- İclal Karaman
- Elif Kızılkaya
- Mihriban Polat
- Öznur Polat
- Berfin Şengül
- Dilşat Yıldız

== Ukraine ==
- Yevhen Stadnyk (Evgeniy, Yavhen)
- Olena Pazderska

== United States ==
- Frank Aasand
- John Aasand
- Russ Armstrong (Russell H. Armstrong)
- Scott Baird
- Russell Barber (Russ)
- Kevin Birr
- Todd Birr
- Kirk Black
- Franklin Bradshaw
- Craig Brown
- Dick Brown
- Steve Brown
- Jon Brunt
- Bob Buchanan
- Daniel Casper
- Bob Christman
- Brady Clark
- Tony Colacchio
- Don Cooper (curler)
- Dale Dalziel (in BC too)
- Randy Darling
- Craig Disher
- Korey Dropkin
- John Dunlop
- Jeff Dutch
- Steve Emt (Stephen Emt)
- Alex Fenson
- Pete Fenson
- Curtis Fish
- Tom Fitzpatrick
- Mike Fraboni
- Al Gagne
- Steve Gebauer
- Tyler George
- George Godfrey
- Geoff Goodland
- Mike Grennan
- Huns Gustrowsky
- Dan Haluptzok
- Mark Haluptzok
- Matt Hamilton
- Wally Henry
- Thomas Howell (curler) (Tom Howell)
- Colin Hufman
- Joel Jacobson
- Zach Jacobson
- John Jahant
- John Jankila
- Greg Johnson
- Tim Johnson
- Doug Jones
- Gary Joraanstad
- James Joseph
- Kevin Kakela
- Doug Kauffman (Doug Kaufman)
- Gary Kleffman
- Robert LaBonte
- John Landsteiner
- Jason Larway
- Joel Larway
- Darren Lehto
- Tom Locken
- Charles Lundgren
- Bob Magie Jr. (Robert)
- Justin Marshall
- Richard Maskel
- Jack McNelly
- Dennis Melland
- Rodney Melland
- Ray Morgan
- Dave Nelson
- Bob Nichols
- Bard Nordlund
- Mike O'Leary
- Gene Ovesen
- David Palmer (Dave)
- Bert Payne
- Britton Payne (Britt)
- Greg Persinger
- Paul Peterson
- James Pierce (Jim Pierce)
- Jim Pleasants (James)
- Chris Plys
- Joe Polo
- Doug Pottinger
- Bob Prenoveau (Robert)
- Paul Pustovar
- Ryan Quinn
- Ed Risling
- Bruce Roberts
- Joe Roberts
- Shawn Rojeski
- Greg Romaniuk (in Manitoba too)
- Bill Rotton
- Rich Ruohonen
- Clark Sampson
- Martin Sather
- Gary Schnee
- Rusty Schieber
- Jerry Scott
- Doug Sewall
- Ed Sheffield
- Billy Shipstad
- John Shuster
- Wes Smith
- Tim Solin
- Bud Somerville
- Tim Somerville
- Andrew Stopera
- Bill Strum
- Mike Strum
- Art Tallackson
- Mark Taylor
- Dave Tellvik
- Philip Tilker
- Bill Todhunter
- Murphy Tomlinson
- Gerry Toutant
- Jerry van Brunt Jr.
- Dave Violette
- Luc Violette
- Tom Violette
- Jim Vukich
- Doug Walker
- Cory Ward
- Travis Way
- Greg Wilson
- Sam Woodward
- John Wright
- Tim Wright
- Tom Wright
- Joe Zbacnik
- Sarah Anderson
- Taylor Anderson
- Bev Behnke
- Bev Birklid
- Beth Bronger-Jones
- Diane Brown
- Erika Brown
- Alexandra Carlson
- Carla Casper
- Cristin Clark
- Maureen Clark
- Susan Dudt
- Mary Dutch
- Aija Edwards
- Kari Erickson
- Cora Farrell
- Joan Fish
- Leslie Frosch
- Courtney George
- Aileen Geving
- Becca Hamilton
- Jamie Haskell
- Mary Hobson (curler)
- Jill Jones
- Nicole Joraanstad
- Missy Keiser (Melissa Keiser)
- Loren Kinney
- Jan Lagasse
- Nancy Langley (Nancy Richard)
- Patti Lank
- Danell Libby (Danelle)
- Meghan Lino (wheelchair)
- Caitlin Maroldo
- Jenna Martin (Jenna Haag)
- Joyance Meechai
- Debbie McCormick
- Lori Mountford
- Sydney Mullaney
- Natalie Nicholson
- Anne O'Hara
- Nancy Pearson (Nancy Wallace)
- Vicky Persinger
- Tabitha Peterson
- Tara Peterson
- Cassandra Potter
- Allison Pottinger
- Rebecca Rodgers
- Nina Roth
- Tracy Sachtjen
- Lisa Schoeneberg
- Jessica Schultz
- Jamie Sinclair
- Delaney Strouse
- Ann Swisshelm
- Cory Thiesse (Christensen)
- Geraldine Tilden (Gerri Tilden)
- Sharon Vukich
- Monica Walker
- Amy Wright

== Wales ==
- John Hunt
- Ian Jones
- Adrian Meikle
- Hugh Meikle
- Jamie Meikle
- Mike Preston
- Clark Shiels
- John Stone
- Chris Wells
- Marion Harrison
- Lisa Peters
