= Scottish Senior Curling Championships =

The Scottish Senior Curling Championships is an annual curling tournament held to determine the best senior-level men's and women's curling teams in Scotland. Senior level curlers must be over the age of 50 as of June 30 in the year prior to the tournament. It has been held annually since the 1972–1973 season for senior men and the 1980–1981 season for senior women. The championship teams play at the World Senior Curling Championships later in the season.

== Past champions ==
Skips marked bold

=== Men ===
Year	Champions team	Runner-up	Bronze
1973	Willie Wilson, Frank Wilson, Tom Dodds, Bob Grieve		
1974	John Hutchison, Alistair McMillan, John McScott, Sam Milby		
1975	Alex Breckenridge, David Arnott, Bill Joiner, Dave Bryce		
1976	Bob Gardner, Bill Kerr, Jimmy Arthur, George Youngson		
1977	Frank Wilson, Willie Wilson, Tom Dodds, Peter Rutherford		
1978	John Hutchison, Tommy Stewart, John Auld, Sam Milby		
1979	Jock Dennis, Bill Soutar, Pat Falconer, Donnie Campbell		
1980	Jock Dennis, Bill Soutar, Pat Falconer, Donnie Campbell		
1981	Bill Phillips, Bill Browning, Ian Forsyth, John Hathorn		
1982	Bill Smith, Bob Clyde, David Rodger, John McPherson		
1983	Sandy Nicoll, Matt McKerrow, Ronnie Graham, John Smith		
1984	Bill Muirhead, Tom Muirhead, Roy Sinclair, John Bryden		
1985	Bill Muirhead, Tom Muirhead, Roy Sinclair, John Bryden		
1986	Bill Muirhead, Tom Muirhead, Roy Sinclair, John Bryden		
1987	Bill Muirhead, Tom Muirhead, Roy Sinclair, John Bryden		
1988	Bill Muirhead, John Bryden, Roy Sinclair, Jim McArthur		
1989	Hammy C McMillan, J Norman Brown, Jim Wallace, Hugh R Parker		
1990	John McCall, Jack Duncan, Ian McGregor, Willie Murray		
1991	David Young, Donald Whyte, George Hardie, Alan Hempseed		
1992	Bill Raeside, Peter Howden, Murdo Fraser, George McQueen		
1993	Duncan McPherson, Ellis Allan, David Sturrock, Gray Kerr		
1994	David Porteous, Sandy Thomson, Willie Halliday, Tom Parker		
1995	Jim Waddell, Jack Muir, Bill Warnock, Bill Watson		
1996	Walter Brown, Bill Morton, Ian McKay, John Smith		
1997	Jim Waddell, Ian Morrison, Jim Forrest, Andrew Cameron		
1998	Eddie Connel, Gordon Muir, Cameron Coutts, Alan Taylor		
1999	Ewan Hay, Robbie Scott, Jimmy Nichol, Alistair Campbell		
2000	Jim Bryson, Jack Kennedy, Jack Brown, Willie Anderson		
2001	Matt Murdoch, John Smith, David Urquhart, William Muir		
2002	Iain Baxter, Jim Muir, Sandy Brown, Harry Ferguson		
2003	Iain Baxter, Jim Muir, Sandy Brown, Harry Ferguson		
2004	David Robertson, George Manson, Jim Stirling, Alan Guthrie		
2005	Bob Smellie, Jim Barr, Ian Gibb, Harry Johnston		
2006	Ronnie Peat, Allan MacLennan, Jim Jamieson, Michael Burton		
2007	Keith Prentice, Lockhart Steele, Thomas Fleming, Robin Aitken		
2008	Graeme Adam, Ken Horton, Stuart Naismith, Allan Maclennan		
2009	Keith Prentice, Lockhart Steele, Robin Aitken, Tommy Fleming		
2010	Keith Prentice, Lockhart Steele, Robin Aitken, Tommy Fleming		
2011	Ken Horton, Gordon Butler, Angus Storrie, Eddie Binks		
2012	Keith Prentice, Lockhart Steele, Robin Aitken, Tommy Fleming		
2013	David Hay, Norman Brown, Andrew McQuistin, Hugh Aitken		
2014	Keith Prentice, Lockhart Steele, Robert Anderson, Tommy Fleming		
2015	David Hay, Norman Brown, Gordon Muirhead, Hugh Aitken, alternate: Mike Hay	Keith Prentice, Lockhart Steele, Robert Anderson, Tommy Fleming	Ken Horton, Alastair Smith, Don Rutherford, Graham Lindsay; Hammy McMillan, Dick Adams, Tom Allan, Jake Blackwood
2016	Gordon Muirhead, Norman Brown, David Hay, Hugh Aitken	Hammy McMillan, Billy Howat, Dougie Templeton, Alex Torrance	Ken Horton, David Ramsay, Alastair Smith, Don Rutherford; Mike Dick, Lindsay Scotland, Trevor Dodds, Michael Parker
2017	Ian Drysdale, Dave McQueen, Ronnie Wilson, Graham Lindsay	Andy Hemming, Billy Johnston, Neil Murray, Steve Russell	Willie Jamieson, Tom Pendreigh, Gary MacFarlane, Jean Lesperance; Gordon Muirhead, Norman Brown, David Hay, Hugh Aitken, alternate: Douglas McMillan
2018	Gordon Muirhead, Norman Brown, David Hay, Hugh Aitken		
2019	David Smith, Mike Hay, Peter Smith, Sandy Hay	Norman Brown, Gordon Muirhead, David Hay, Hugh Aitken	Robert Clark, Billy Howat, Alistiar Smith, Douglas Reid; Philip Wilson, Robbie Dick, Murray McWilliam, Paul Soriani, alternate: Geral Baillie
2020	Keith Prentice, John Davie, John Dowell, Robert Anderson, alternate: Mike Ferguson	John Duff, Neil Murray, Doug Wilson, Alan Joiner	David Hardie, Alex Dickson, Gordon McKnight, Russell Davidson; Phil Wilson, Robbie Dick, Murray McWilliam, Paul Soriani, alternate: Gerald Baillie
2021	championship was not held because COVID-19		
2022	Keith Prentice, John Davie, John Dowell, Mike Ferguson, alternate: Robert Anderson	Philip Wilson, Robbie Dick, Murray McWilliam, Gerald Baillie, alternate: Paul Soriani	Peter Wilson, Calum Harvey, Brian Fleming, Alex Torrance; Hugh Neilson, William Baird, Robert Kirkland, Alex Fleming
2023	Graeme Connal, Alistair Scott, Mark Fraser, Mark Brass		
2024	Hammy McMillan, Murray McWilliam, John Agnew, Gerald Baillie	Graham Cormack, Stephen Rankin, Brian Ferguson, Johnnie Munro	Graeme Connal, Alistair Scott, Mark Fraser, Mark Brass
2025	Tom Brewster, Frazer Hare, Robbie Stevenson, Don Frame	Graham Cormack, Stephen Rankin, Brian Ferguson, Johnnie Munro	Graeme Connal, Alistair Scott, Mark Fraser, Mark Brass; Hammy McMillan, David Murchie, Murray McWiliam, Gerald Baillie
2026	Tom Brewster, Frazer Hare, Robbie Stevenson, Don Frame	John Duff, Neil Murray, Doug Wilson, Ian Keron	Neil Joss, Alexander Christie, Gary Rutherford, Mark Blair; Ian Robertson, Findlay Russell, Gavin Walker, Steve Adam

=== Women ===
Year	Champions team	Runner-up	Bronze
1981	Janice Thomson, Mary Hamilton, Sheena Montgomery, Cathy Ferguson		
1982	Frances Brodie, Cathie Drysdale, Lorna Nicol, Mary Crerar		
1983	Jenny Nicol, Lucille Thomson, Kate Dunsire, Lucy Fleming		
1984	Nancy Whiteford, Jessie Whiteford, Lena Lockart, Mary Stark		
1985	Mattie Smith, Doreen McGawn, Joan Connolly, Mattie Wilson		
1986	Mattie Smillie, Mary Tyre, Jean Connolly, Mattie Wilson		
1987	Dorothy Calderwood, Anne Brown, Betty Milne, Vi Campbell		
1988	Helen Caird, Isobel Roy, Jean Fairlie, Betty Scott		
1989	Jess Paterson, Kirsty Bullions, Margaret Hendry, Chris Davidson		
1990	Jess Paterson, Kirsty Bullions, Margaret Jarvie, Margaret Hendry		
1991	Linda Fraser, Helen McLeod, Lily Barrie, Aileen Kelly		
1992	Aubrey Guild, Betty Loudon, Nan Muirhead, Flora McMillan		
1993	Ena Smith, Meg Allan, Barbara Dykes, Isobel Forrest		
1994	Ena Smith, Meg Allan, Barbara Dykes, Isobel Forrest		
1995	Isobel Ross, Margaret Ross, Ella Walker, Sandra South		
1996	Marjorie Kidd, Audrey Laird, Hilda Nicoll, Sheila Miller		
1997	Kirsty Letton, Judy Mackenzie, Pat Orr, Anne McDougall		
1998	Kirsty Letton, Judy Mackenzie, Pat Orr, Anne McDougall		
1999	Kirsty Letton, Judy Mackenzie, Pat Orr, Anne McDougall		
2000	Kirsty Letton, Judy Mackenzie, Pat Orr, Anne McDougall		
2001	Mary White, Heather Farquhar, Maureen Patullo, Janet Carmichael		
2002	Christine Kerr, Margaret McLaughlan, Margaret Withycombe, Jane Paterson		
2003	Carolyn Morris, Pat Lockhart, Trudie Milne, Linda Lesperence		
2004	Kirsty Letton, Judy Mackenzie, Pat Orr, Anne McDougall		
2005	Carolyn Morris, Pat Lockhart, Trudie Milne, Linda Lesperence		
2006	Carolyn Morris, Pat Lockhart, Trudie Milne, Linda Lesperence		
2007	Carolyn Morris, Jean Robertson, Trudie Milne, Linda Lesperence		
2008	Kirsty Letton, Judy Mackenzie, Pat Orr, Ann MacDougall		
2009	Marion Criag, Rhona Fleming, Catherine Raeburn, Anne Malcolm		
2010	Isobel Waddell, Elma McCulloch, Kathleen Scott, Lynne Stevenson		
2011	Linda Young, Margaret Scott, Hazel Swankie, Fiona DeVries		
2012	Barbara Watt, Jean Hammond, Maggie Barry, Valerie Mahon		
2013	Christine Cannon, Margaret Richardson, Janet Lindsay, Margaret Robertson		
2014	Christine Cannon, Margaret Richardson, Isobel Hannen, Janet Lindsay		
2015	Kay Gibb, Carol Scott, Elinor Ritchie, Margaret Archer	Christine Cannon, Margaret Richardson, Isobel Hannen, Janet Lindsay	Kate Adams, Catherine Dodds, Jill Florence, Elspeth Johnston; Isobel Waddell, Jackie Craig, Dot Moran, Liz Horton, alternate: Jane McLaren
2016	Jackie Lockhart, Christine Cannon, Isobel Hannen, Margaret Richardson	Gwen Prentice, Marion Craig, Helen Drummond, Rhona Fleming	Elizabeth Glennie, Maggie Scott, Fiona DeVries, Susan Scougal; Kay Gibb, Kate Henderson, Marion Malcolm, Liz Horton
2017	Jackie Lockhart, Christine Cannon, Isobel Hannen, Margaret Richardson	Jane McLaren, Jackie Craig, Fiona MacFarlane, Marjorie McCulloch	Elizabeth Glennie, Margaret Scott, Susan Scougal, Fiona Devries; Gwen Prentice, Marion Craig, Helen Drummond, Rhona Fleming
2018	Susan Kesley, Fran Stretton, Vicky Gumley, Morna Aitken		
2019	Susan Kesley, Fran Stretton, Vicky Gumley, Morna Aitken	Jackie Lockhart, Christine Cannon, Isobel Hannen, Margaret Richardson	Margaret Agnew, Gail Thomson, Linda McAulay, Gillian King; Wendy Henderson, Margaret Robertson, Anne McAulay, Liz Martin
2020	Jackie Lockhart, Edith Hazard, Mairi Milne, Katie Loudon, alternate: Wendy Johnston	Susan Kesley, Fran Streeton, Vicky Gumley, Morna Aitken	Margaret Agnew, Gail Thomson, Linda McAulay, Gillian King; Jane McLaren, Marjorie McCulloch, Susan Scouga, Caroline Liddle
2021	championship was not held because COVID-19		
2022	Mairi Milne, Edith Hazard, Wendy Johnston, Katie Loudon	Susan Kesley, Fran Stretton, Vicky Gormley, Morna Aitken	Liz Paul , Ann-Maree Davidson, Shona Watt, Anne Shaw
2023	Jackie Lockhart, Mairi Milne, Wendy Johnston, Katie Loudon, alternate: Edith Hazard		
2024	Gail Thomson, Alison Cunningham, Linda McAulay, Gillian King	Jackie Lockhart, Mairi Milne, Wendy Johnston, Katie Loudon	Susan Wyllie, Fran Stretton, Vicky Gormley, Morna Aitken
2025	Jackie Lockhart, Mairi Milne, Wendy Johnston, Katie Loudon	Margaret Agnew, Sheila Kennedy, Ann Redpath, Susan Middleton	Karen Kennedy, Gail Thomson, Alison Cunningham, Gillian King
2026	Jackie Lockhart, Mairi Milne, Claire Milne, Katie Loudon	Margaret Agnew, Sheila Kennedy, Ann Redpath, Susan Middleton	Karen Kennedy, Gail Thomson, Alison Cunningham, Gillian King

== See also ==
- Scottish Men's Curling Championship
- Scottish Women's Curling Championship
- Scottish Mixed Curling Championship
- Scottish Mixed Doubles Curling Championship
- Scottish Junior Curling Championships
- Scottish Schools Curling Championship
- Scottish Wheelchair Curling Championship
