= Richard Dickson (curler) =

Scottish male curler

- Curler ♂

Team
- Curling club: Airleywight CC, Perth

Curling career
- Member Association: Scotland
- World Championship: 1 (1996)
Medal record
Curling
World Championships
Silver medal – second place	1996 Hamilton

Richard Dickson is a Scottish male curler.

At the international level, he is a 1996 World Men's silver medallist.

== Teams ==
Season	Skip	Third	Second	Lead	Alternate	Coach	Events
1983–84	Ian Watt	Richard Dickson	Graham Marchbank	Lindsay Pithers			SSchCC 1984 (silver)
1995–96	Warwick Smith	David Smith	Peter Smith	David Hay	Richard Dickson	Ronald Brewster	WCC 1996 (silver)
2004–05	David Edwards	Moray Combe	Richard Dickson	Sandy Reid			SMCC 2005 (9th)
