= Brian Binnie (curler) =

Scottish male curler and coach

- Curler ♂
- Born: April 1968 (age 58)

Team
- Curling club: Castle Kennedy CC, Stranraer
- Skip: Graham Shaw
- Third: Brian Binnie
- Second: Graham Cormack
- Lead: Robin Niven

Curling career
- Member Association: Scotland
- World Championship: 1 (1997)
- European Championship: 2 (1995, 1996)
Medal record
Curling
World Championships
Bronze medal – third place	1997 Bern
European Championships
Gold medal – first place	1995 Grindelwald
Gold medal – first place	1996 Kopenhagen
Scottish Men's Championship
Gold medal – first place	1997

Brian George Kinnear Binnie (born April 1968) is a Scottish male curler.

He is a two-time European curling champion and World men's bronze medallist

== Teams ==
=== Men's ===
Season	Skip	Third	Second	Lead	Alternate	Coach	Events
1994–95	Brian Binnie	Duncan Bertram	Gordon Craik	Fraser Hare			
1995–96	Hammy McMillan	Norman Brown	Mike Hay	Roger McIntyre	Brian Binnie	Hew Chalmers	ECC 1995 (gold)
1996–97	Hammy McMillan	Norman Brown	Mike Hay	Brian Binnie	Peter Loudon (ECC, WCC)		ECC 1996 (gold); SMCC 1997 (gold); WCC 1997 (bronze)
2005–06	Brian Binnie	Neil Hampton	Richard Goldie	Neil Wilson			SMCC 2006 (7th)
2006–07	Brian Binnie	Neil Hampton	Richard Goldie	David Mundell			
2010–11	Graham Shaw	Brian Binnie	David Hay	Robin Niven			SMCC 2011 (9th)
2011–12	David Hay	Brian Binnie	Graham Shaw	Robin Niven			
2012–13	Graham Shaw	Brian Binnie	Richard Goldie	Robin Niven			
2013–14	Graham Shaw	Brian Binnie	Graham Cormack	Robin Niven			
2014–15	Graham Shaw	Brian Binnie	Graham Cormack	Robin Niven			
2015–16	Graham Shaw	Brian Binnie	Graham Cormack	Robin Niven			
2017–18	Graham Shaw	Brian Binnie	Graham Cormack	Robin Niven			SMCC 2018 (10th)

=== Mixed ===
Season	Skip	Third	Second	Lead	Events
1996	Brian Binnie	Claire Milne	Duncan Bertram	Alison Binnie	SMxCC 1996 (gold)
1997	Brian Binnie	Claire Milne	Warwick Smith	Alison Binnie	SMxCC 1997 (gold)
2003	Brian Binnie	Claire Milne	Ronald Brewster	Nancy Murdoch	SMxCC 2003 (silver)

== Private life ==
Married to Alison Binnie and have 3 sons. They co-founded company Denfind Stone Ltd in 2004.
