= Åkerlund =

Åkerlund is a Swedish surname. Notable people with the surname include:

- Gunnar Åkerlund (1923–2006), Swedish sprint canoeist
- Jonas Åkerlund (born 1965), Swedish film and music video director
- Magnus Åkerlund (born 1986), Swedish ice hockey player
- Olle Åkerlund (1911–1978), Swedish sailor
- Totte Åkerlund (Erik) (1915–2009), Swedish curler
