= Grant McPherson =

Scottish curler

- Curler ♂

Team
- Curling club: Forest Hills Trossachs CC, Kinlochard

Curling career
- Member Association: Scotland
- World Championship: 1 (1987)
Medal record
Curling
Scottish Men's Championship
Gold medal – first place	1987 Kirkcaldy
Silver medal – second place	1988 Perth

Grant McPherson (born c. 1964 or 1965) is a Scottish curler.

At the national level, he is a one-time Scottish men's champion, winning a national title in 1987. He represented Scotland at the 1987 World Men's Curling Championship, but was banned from representing Scotland at the 1987 European Curling Championships due to a disciplinary infraction.

At the time of the 1988 Scottish Championship, he worked as a draughtsman in Ayrshire. He is a left-handed curler.

== Teams ==
Season	Skip	Third	Second	Lead	Events
1984–85	Graeme P. Adam	Ken J. Horton	Grant McPherson	Robert Wilson	
1985–86	Grant McPherson	Lindsay Clark	Billy Andrew	Jim Goldie	SJMCC 1986
1986–87	Grant McPherson	Hammy McMillan	Robert Wilson	Richard Harding	SMCC 1987 (gold); WCC 1987 (8th)
1987–88	Grant McPherson	R. Gray	David Howie	Robert Wilson	SMCC 1988 (silver)
1989–90	Grant McPherson	Gordon Muirhead	R W Kelly	Robert Wilson	
1990–91	Grant McPherson	Billy Andrew	Robert Wilson	Robert Clark	SMCC 1991
1991–92	Grant McPherson	Mike Hay	Billy Andrew	Derek Brown	SMCC 1992
1993–94	Mike Hay	Ms K Hay	Grant McPherson	Ms S Harvey	
