= Alan Glen (curler) =

Scottish curler

- Curler

Team
- Curling club: Kilgraston & Moncrieffe
- Skip: Chuck Hay
- Third: John Bryden
- Second: Alan Glen
- Lead: Jimmy Hamilton

Curling career
- Member Association: Scotland
- World Championship: 5 (1963, 1965, 1966, 1967, 1968)
Medal record
Curling
World Men's Championship
Gold medal – first place	1967 Perth
Silver medal – second place	1963 Perth
Silver medal – second place	1966 Vancouver
Silver medal – second place	1968 Point-Claire
Scottish Men's Championship
Gold medal – first place	1963
Gold medal – first place	1965
Gold medal – first place	1966
Gold medal – first place	1967
Gold medal – first place	1968
Silver medal – second place	1964

Alan Glen is a Scottish curler.

He played second on Chuck Hay's team out of the Kilgraston & Moncrieffe Curling Club in Perth, Scotland during a very successful run in the 1960s. In the span of six years the team won the Scottish Men's Championship five times, earning them the right to represent Scotland at the World Curling Championships in those years. At World's in 1963, 1966, and 1968 the Hay rink took home the silver medal, with Canada winning the Championship each of those years. At the 1967 World Men's Championship they defeated Team Sweden, skipped by Bob Woods, in the final to win Scotland's first World Men's Championship.

In 1983 Glen skipped his team of Murray Melville, Scott Symon, and Leonard Dudman to victory at the Perth Masters.

Glen worked as a farmer in Perthshire.

== Teams ==
Season	Skip	Third	Second	Lead	Events
1962–63	Chuck Hay	John Bryden	Alan Glen	Jimmy Hamilton	SMCC 1963 (gold); WMCC 1963 (silver)
1964–65	Chuck Hay	John Bryden	Alan Glen	David Howie	SMCC 1965 (gold); WMCC 1965 (4th)
1965–66	Chuck Hay	John Bryden	Alan Glen	David Howie	SMCC 1966 (gold); WMCC 1966 (silver)
1966–67	Chuck Hay	John Bryden	Alan Glen	David Howie	SMCC 1967 (gold); WMCC 1967 (gold)
1967–68	Chuck Hay	John Bryden	Alan Glen	David Howie	SMCC 1968 (gold); WMCC 1968 (silver)
1982–83	Alan Glen	Murray Melville	Scott Symon	Leonard Dudman	Perth Masters 1983 (gold)
