= Scottish Men's Curling Championship =

Curling championship in Scotland

- Established: 1962
- 2026 host city: Dumfries
- 2026 arena: Dumfries Ice Bowl
- 2026 champion: Ross Whyte

The Scottish Men's Curling Championship is the national men's curling championship for Scotland. The championship usually decides which team of curlers is sent to the World Curling Championship, but in Olympic years, the winner must play the British Olympic representative to play to determine the Scottish team at the Worlds. Beginning in 2021, Scotland's World Championship teams will be selected by Scottish Curling instead. In 2026, the championship will determine which team is sent to the European Curling Championships, with the exceptions of in the Olympic year, where the current Olympic representatives will have a playoff against the Scottish Champions, and in the year preceding the Olympics, where the Olympic representative will be selected for the Europeans as preparation for the Olympics.

== Past champions ==
| Year | Skip | Third | Second | Lead | Locale |
|---|---|---|---|---|---|
| 1962 | Willie Young | John Pearson | Sandy Anderson | Robert Young | Stirling |
| 1963 | Chuck Hay | John Bryden | Alan Glen | James Hamilton | Perth |
| 1964 | Alex F. Torrance | Alex A. Torrance | Robert Kirkland | James Waddell | Hamilton |
| 1965 | Chuck Hay | John Bryden | Alan Glen | David Howie | Perth |
| 1966 | Chuck Hay | John Bryden | Alan Glen | David Howie | Perth |
| 1967 | Chuck Hay | John Bryden | Alan Glen | David Howie | Perth |
| 1968 | Chuck Hay | John Bryden | Alan Glen | David Howie | Perth |
| 1969 | Bill Muirhead | George Haggart | Derek Scott | Alex Young | Perth |
| 1970 | Bill Muirhead | George Haggart | Derek Scott | Murray Melville | Perth |
| 1971 | James Sanderson | Willie Sanderson | Iain Baxter | Colin Baxter | Edinburgh |
| 1972 | Alex F. Torrance | Alex A. Torrance | Robert Kirkland | James Waddell | Hamilton |
| 1973 | Alex F. Torrance | Alex A. Torrance | Tom McGregor | Willie Kerr | Hamilton |
| 1974 | James Waddell | James Steele | Robert Kirkland | Willie Frame | Hamilton |
| 1975 | Alex F. Torrance | Alex A. Torrance | Willie Kerr | Tom MacGregor | Hamilton |
| 1976 | Bill Muirhead | Derek Scott | Len Dudman | Roy Sinclair | Perth |
| 1977 | Ken Horton | Willie Jamieson | Keith Douglas | Richard Harding | Glasgow |
| 1978 | James Sanderson | Iain Baxter | Willie Sanderson | Colin Baxter | Edinburgh |
| 1979 | James Waddell | Willie Frame | Jim Forrest | George Bryan | Hamilton |
| 1980 | Barton Henderson | Greig Henderson | William Henderson | Alastair Sinclair | Aberdeen |
| 1981 | Colin Hamilton | Michael Dick | David Ramsay | Richard Pretsel | Edinburgh |
| 1982 | Colin Hamilton | David Ramsay | Michael Dick | Richard Pretsel | Edinburgh |
| 1983 | Graeme Adam | Ken Horton | Andrew McQuistin | Bob Cowan | Irvine |
| 1984 | Mike Hay | David Hay | David Smith | Russell Keiller | Perth |
| 1985 | Billy Howat | Robert Clark | Robert Shaw | Alistair Henry | Ayr |
| 1986 | David Smith | Hammy McMillan | Mike Hay | Peter Smith | Perth |
| 1987 | Grant McPherson | Hammy McMillan | Bobby Wilson | Richard Harding | Kinlochard |
| 1988 | David Smith | Hammy McMillan | Mike Hay | Peter Smith | Perth |
| 1989 | Graeme Adam | Ken Horton | Andrew McQuistin | Robin Copland | Glasgow |
| 1990 | David Smith | Mike Hay | Peter Smith | David Hay | Perth |
| 1991 | David Smith | Graeme Connal | Peter Smith | David Hay | Perth |
| 1992 | Hammy McMillan | Norman Brown | Gordon Muirhead | Roger McIntyre | Stranraer |
| 1993 | David Smith | Graeme Connal | Peter Smith | David Hay | Perth |
| 1994 | Colin Hamilton | Bob Kelly | Vic Moran | Colin Barr | Livingston |
| 1995 | Gordon Muirhead | Peter Loudon | Bob Kelly | Russell Keiller | Livingston |
| 1996 | Warwick Smith | David Smith | Peter Smith | David Hay | Perth |
| 1997 | Hammy McMillan | Norman Brown | Mike Hay | Brian Binnie | Stranraer |
| 1998 | David Smith | Warwick Smith | Peter Smith | David Hay | Perth |
| 1999 | Hammy McMillan | Warwick Smith | Ewan MacDonald | Peter Loudon | Inverness |
| 2000 | Robert Kelly | Neil Hampton | Tom Pendreigh | Ross Hepburn | Inverness |
| 2001 | Hammy McMillan | Warwick Smith | Ewan MacDonald | Peter Loudon | Inverness |
| 2002 | Peter Smith | David Hay | Graham Cormack | Steve Rankin | Perth |
| 2003 | David Murdoch | Craig Wilson | Neil Murdoch | Euan Byers | Lockerbie |
| 2004 | Ewan MacDonald | Warwick Smith | David Hay | Peter Loudon | Inverness |
| 2005 | David Murdoch | Craig Wilson | Neil Murdoch | Euan Byers | Lockerbie |
| 2006 | David Murdoch | Ewan MacDonald | Warwick Smith | Euan Byers | Lockerbie |
| 2007 | Warwick Smith | Craig Wilson | David Smith | Ross Hepburn | Perth |
| 2008 | David Murdoch | Graeme Connal | Peter Smith | Euan Byers | Lockerbie |
| 2009 | David Murdoch | Ewan MacDonald | Peter Smith | Euan Byers | Lockerbie |
| 2010 | Warwick Smith | Craig Wilson | David Smith | Ross Hepburn | Perth |
| 2011 | Tom Brewster | Greg Drummond | Scott Andrews | Michael Goodfellow | Aberdeen |
| 2012 | Tom Brewster | Greg Drummond | Scott Andrews | Michael Goodfellow | Aberdeen |
| 2013 | Tom Brewster | David Murdoch | Greg Drummond | Scott Andrews | Aberdeen |
| 2014 | Ewan MacDonald | Duncan Fernie | David Reid | Euan Byers | Inverness |
| 2015 | Ewan MacDonald | Duncan Fernie | Ruairidh Greenwood | Euan Byers | Inverness |
| 2016 | Tom Brewster | Glen Muirhead | Ross Paterson | Hammy McMillan Jr. | Aberdeen |
| 2017 | David Murdoch | Greg Drummond | Scott Andrews | Michael Goodfellow | Lockerbie |
| 2018 | Bruce Mouat | Grant Hardie | Bobby Lammie | Hammy McMillan Jr. | Murrayfield |
| 2019 | Bruce Mouat | Grant Hardie | Bobby Lammie | Hammy McMillan Jr. | Murrayfield |
| 2020 | Bruce Mouat | Grant Hardie | Bobby Lammie | Hammy McMillan Jr. | Murrayfield |
| 2021 | Cancelled due to the COVID-19 pandemic in Scotland | | | | |
| 2022 | Ross Paterson | Kyle Waddell | Duncan Menzies | Craig Waddell | Stirling |
| 2023 | Bruce Mouat | Grant Hardie | Bobby Lammie | Hammy McMillan Jr. | Edinburgh |
| 2024 | Ross Whyte | Robin Brydone | Duncan McFadzean | Euan Kyle | Stirling |
| 2025 | Ross Whyte | Robin Brydone | Duncan McFadzean | Euan Kyle | Stirling |
| 2026 | Ross Whyte | Robin Brydone | Craig Waddell | Euan Kyle | Stirling |

== See also ==
- Scottish Women's Curling Championship
- Scottish Mixed Curling Championship
- Scottish Mixed Doubles Curling Championship
- Scottish Junior Curling Championships
- Scottish Senior Curling Championships
- Scottish Schools Curling Championship
- Scottish Wheelchair Curling Championship
