= Alan Hannah =

Scottish male curler and coach

- Curler ♂
- Born: 25 November 1971 (age 54); Stranraer, Scotland

Curling career
- Member Association: Scotland
Medal record
Curling

Alan Hannah (born 25 November 1971 in Stranraer, Scotland) is a Scottish curler and curling coach from Renfrew, Scotland.

He started coaching in 2005. Since 2015 he has been the coach of Bruce Mouat's team.

== Teams ==
Season	Skip	Third	Second	Lead
2010–11	John Dunn	Alan Hannah	Graeme Baxter	David McEwen
2012–13	Alan Hannah	Gary Cannell	Alasdair Schreiber	Gary McFarlane

== Record as a coach of national teams ==
Year	Tournament, event	National team	Place
2005	2005 World Junior Curling Championships	Scotland (junior men)	3rd place, bronze medalist(s)
2006	2006 World Junior Curling Championships	Scotland (junior men)	3rd place, bronze medalist(s)
2007	2007 World Junior Curling Championships	Scotland (junior men)	6
2008	2008 European Curling Championships	Scotland (women)	6
2009	2009 World Junior Curling Championships	Scotland (junior men)	9
2016	2016 World Junior Curling Championships	Scotland (junior men)	1st place, gold medalist(s)
2018	2018 World Junior Curling Championships	Scotland (junior men)	2nd place, silver medalist(s)
2018	2018 World Men's Curling Championship	Scotland (men)	3rd place, bronze medalist(s)
2018	2018–19 Curling World Cup – First Leg	Scotland (men)	3rd place, bronze medalist(s)
2018	2018 European Curling Championships	Scotland (men)	1st place, gold medalist(s)
2018	2018–19 Curling World Cup – Second Leg	Scotland (men)	3rd place, bronze medalist(s)
2019	2019 World Men's Curling Championship	Scotland (men)	6

== Record as a coach of club teams ==
Season	Event	Team	Place
2004–05	2005 Scottish Junior Championships (junior men)	Logan Gray	1st place, gold medalist(s)
2004–05	2005 Scottish Men's Championship	Logan Gray	10th
2005–06	2006 Scottish Junior Championships (junior men)	Logan Gray	1st place, gold medalist(s)
2005–06	2006 Scottish Men's Championship	Logan Gray	8th
2006–07	2007 Scottish Junior Championships (junior men)	Logan Gray	1st place, gold medalist(s)
2006–07	2007 Scottish Men's Championship	Logan Gray	9th
2008–09	2009 Scottish Junior Championships (junior men)	Graeme Black	1st place, gold medalist(s)
2013–14	2014 Scottish Junior Championships (junior men)	Stuart Taylor	2nd place, silver medalist(s)
2014–15	2015 Scottish Junior Championships (junior men)	Stuart Taylor	3rd place, bronze medalist(s)
2015–16	2016 Scottish Junior Championships (junior men)	Bruce Mouat	1st place, gold medalist(s)
2015–16	2016 Scottish Men's Championship	Bruce Mouat	4th
2016–17	2017 Scottish Men's Championship	Bruce Mouat	2nd place, silver medalist(s)
2017–18	2018 Scottish Junior Championships (junior men)	Ross Whyte	1st place, gold medalist(s)
2017–18	2018 Scottish Men's Championship	Bruce Mouat	1st place, gold medalist(s)
2018–19	2019 Scottish Men's Championship	Bruce Mouat	1st place, gold medalist(s)
