= Ronald Brewster =

Scottish male curler and coach

- Curler ♂
- Born: 2 April 1976 (age 50); St Andrews, Fife, Scotland

Curling career
- Member Association: Scotland
- European Championship: 2 (2003, 2004)
- Other appearances: World Junior Curling Championships: 2 (1995, 1996)
Medal record
Curling
European Championships
Gold medal – first place	2003 Courmayeur
Scottish Men's Championship
Silver medal – second place	2007
Silver medal – second place	2009
Scottish Mixed Championship
Silver medal – second place	2003
World Junior Championships
Gold medal – first place	1995 Perth
Gold medal – first place	1996 Red Deer
Scottish Junior Championships
Gold medal – first place	1995
Gold medal – first place	1996

Ronald "Ron" Brewster (born 2 April 1976 in St Andrews, Fife, Scotland) is a Scottish curler and curling coach. He won the European curling championship in 2003.

== Teams ==
=== Men's ===
Season	Skip	Third	Second	Lead	Alternate	Coach	Events
1994–95	Tom Brewster	Paul Westwood	Ronald Brewster	Steve Still	David Murdoch (WJCC)		SJCC 1995 (gold); WJCC 1995 (gold)
1995–96	James Dryburgh	Ross Barnet	Ronald Brewster	David Murdoch	Euan Byers (WJCC)		SJCC 1996 (gold); WJCC 1996 (gold)
1996–97	Tom Brewster	Richard Goldie	Ronald Brewster	David Murdoch			
2000–01	Tom Brewster	Graeme Connal	Ronald Brewster	Mark Brass			
2002–03	Tom Brewster	Graeme Connal	Ronald Brewster	Colin Campbell			
2003–04	David Murdoch	Craig Wilson	Neil Murdoch	Euan Byers	Ronald Brewster	Tom Pendreigh	ECC 2003 (gold)
2003–04	Tom Brewster	Graeme Connal	Ronald Brewster	Colin Campbell			
2004–05	David Murdoch	Craig Wilson	Neil Murdoch	Euan Byers	Ronald Brewster	Tom Pendreigh	ECC 2004 (4th)
2004–05	Tom Brewster	Graeme Connal	Ronald Brewster	Colin Campbell			SMCC 2005 (6th)
2005–06	Tom Brewster	Graeme Connal	Ronald Brewster	Colin Campbell			SMCC 2006 (4th)
2006–07	Tom Brewster	Hammy McMillan	Ronald Brewster	Colin Campbell			SMCC 2007 (silver)
2007–08	Tom Brewster	Hammy McMillan	Ronald Brewster	Colin Campbell			
2008–09	Tom Brewster	Duncan Fernie	Ronald Brewster	Colin Campbell			SMCC 2009 (silver)
2008–09	Tom Brewster	Duncan Fernie	Ronald Brewster	David Edwards			
2009–10	Tom Brewster	Duncan Fernie	Ronald Brewster	David Edwards			

=== Mixed ===
Season	Skip	Third	Second	Lead	Events
2002–03	Brian Binnie	Claire Milne	Ronald Brewster	Nancy Murdoch	SMxCC 2003 (silver)

== Record as a coach of national teams ==
Year	Tournament, event	National team	Place
2005	2005 World Junior Curling Championships	Scotland (junior women)	7
2011	2011 World Men's Curling Championship	Scotland (men)	2nd place, silver medalist(s)
2012	2012 World Men's Curling Championship	Scotland (men)	2nd place, silver medalist(s)

== Private life ==
Ronald is from curlers family: his older brother Tom Brewster is well-known curler, 2014 Winter Olympics silver medallist.
