= John Bryden (curler) =

Scottish curler

- Curler
- Born: 1927
- Died: 2012 (aged 85)

Team
- Curling club: Kilgraston & Moncrieffe CC

Curling career
- World Championship: 5 (1963, 1965, 1966, 1967, 1968)
Medal record
Representing Scotland
Men's Curling
World Men's Championship
Gold medal – first place	1967 Perth
Silver medal – second place	1963 Perth
Silver medal – second place	1966 Vancouver
Silver medal – second place	1968 Point-Claire
Scottish Men's Championship
Gold medal – first place	1963
Gold medal – first place	1965
Gold medal – first place	1966
Gold medal – first place	1967
Gold medal – first place	1968

John Bryden (1927–2012) was a Scottish curler. He competed in four World Championships, winning the gold medal in 1967.

== Curling career ==
He played third on Chuck Hay's team out of the Kilgraston & Moncrieffe Curling Club in Perth, Scotland during a very successful run in the 1960s. In the span of six years the team won the Scottish Men's Championship five times, earning them the right to represent Scotland at the World Curling Championships in those years. At World's in 1963, 1966, and 1968 the Hay rink took home the silver medal, with Canada winning the Championship each of those years. At the 1967 World Men's Championship they defeated Team Sweden, skipped by Bob Woods, in the final to win Scotland's first World Men's Championship.

In the 1980s Bryden returned to competitive curling on Bill Muirhead's senior men's team, winning the Scottish Senior Curling Championships five years in a row.

== Personal life ==
Bryden worked as a farmer in Perthshire.

== Teams ==
Season	Skip	Third	Second	Lead	Events
1962–63	Chuck Hay	John Bryden	Alan Glen	Jimmy Hamilton	SMCC 1963 (gold); WMCC 1963 (silver)
1964–65	Chuck Hay	John Bryden	Alan Glen	David Howie	SMCC 1965 (gold); WMCC 1965 (4th)
1965–66	Chuck Hay	John Bryden	Alan Glen	David Howie	SMCC 1966 (gold); WMCC 1966 (silver)
1966–67	Chuck Hay	John Bryden	Alan Glen	David Howie	SMCC 1967 (gold); WMCC 1967 (gold)
1967–68	Chuck Hay	John Bryden	Alan Glen	David Howie	SMCC 1968 (gold); WMCC 1968 (silver)
1975–76	Chuck Hay	John Bryden	Alex Young	Morris Morton	
1983–84	Bill Muirhead	Tom Muirhead	Roy Sinclair	John Bryden	SSCC 1984 (gold)
1984–85	Bill Muirhead	Tom Muirhead	Roy Sinclair	John Bryden	SSCC 1985 (gold)
1985–86	Bill Muirhead	Tom Muirhead	Roy Sinclair	John Bryden	SSCC 1986 (gold)
1986–87	Bill Muirhead	Tom Muirhead	Roy Sinclair	John Bryden	SSCC 1987 (gold)
1987–88	Bill Muirhead	John Bryden	Roy Sinclair	Jim McArthur	SSCC 1988 (gold)
