= Bill Muirhead (curler) =

Scottish male curler (1928–2021)

- Curler ♂
- Born: 27 December 1928; Crook of Devon, Scotland
- Died: 24 November 2021 (aged 92); Scone, Scotland

Team
- Curling club: St. Martins CC, Perth

Curling career
- Member Association: Scotland
- World Championship: 3 (1969, 1970, 1976)
Medal record
Curling
World Championship
Silver medal – second place	1970 Utica
Silver medal – second place	1976 Duluth
Bronze medal – third place	1969 Perth
Scottish Men's Championship
Gold medal – first place	1969
Gold medal – first place	1970
Gold medal – first place	1976

Bill Muirhead (27 December 1928 – 24 November 2021) was a Scottish curler. He was a World Men's silver medallist (1970, 1976), bronze medallist (1969) and three-time Scottish men's champion. His daughter Billie-May competed at the 1983 World Championship. His brother Thomas (Tom) Muirhead is the father of Gordon and grandfather of Glen, Eve, and Thomas Muirhead. Bill Muirhead previously coached David Smith in the 1980s. He died in Scone on 24 November 2021, at the age of 92.

== Personal life ==
Muirhead was the son of Tom and Mary Muirhead, who were farmers. The family bought the Lomond Hotel in Glenfarg where Bill grew up. He was educated at Glenfarg Primary and Dollar Academy. He married Nan Brunton at around the age of 25, and the couple had three children, Catriona, Lesley and Billie-May. They spent most of their life in Scone. Muirhead managed the Ross Seed Potatoes Forfar branch. In addition to curling, Muirhead also golfed well into old age.

== Teams ==
Season	Skip	Third	Second	Lead	Alternate	Events
1968–69	Bill Muirhead	George Haggart	Derek Scott	Alex Young	Murray Melville (WMCC)	SMCC 1969 (gold); WMCC 1969 (bronze)
1969–70	Bill Muirhead	George Haggart	Derek Scott	Murray Melville		SMCC 1970 (gold); WMCC 1970 (silver)
1970–71	Bill Muirhead	Bill Reid	Derek Scott	Len Dudman		
1975–76	Bill Muirhead	Derek Scott	Len Dudman	Roy Sinclair		SMCC 1976 (gold); WMCC 1976 (silver)
1983–84	Bill Muirhead	Tom Muirhead	Roy Sinclair	John Bryden		SSCC 1984 (gold)
1984–85	Bill Muirhead	Tom Muirhead	Roy Sinclair	John Bryden		SSCC 1985 (gold)
1985–86	Bill Muirhead	Tom Muirhead	Roy Sinclair	John Bryden		SSCC 1986 (gold)
1986–87	Bill Muirhead	Tom Muirhead	Roy Sinclair	John Bryden		SSCC 1987 (gold)
1987–88	Bill Muirhead	John Bryden	Roy Sinclair	Jim McArthur		SSCC 1988 (gold)
