= 1967 Scotch Cup =

Eighth edition of the Scotch Cup

- Host city: Perth, Scotland
- Arena: Perth Ice Rink
- Dates: March 20–23, 1967
- Winner: Scotland
- Curling club: Kilgraston & Moncrieffe CC, Perth
- Skip: Chuck Hay
- Third: John Bryden
- Second: Alan Glen
- Lead: David Howie
- Finalist: Sweden

The 1967 Scotch Cup was the eighth edition of the Scotch Cup. It was held in Perth, Scotland at the Perth Ice Rink from March 20–23, 1967. Eight teams competed at the tournament with Germany competing in the Scotch Cup for the first time. In the final, Scotland took home their first Scotch Cup defeating Sweden 8–5 in the final with Canada not getting a medal for the first time as the United States finished third.

== Teams ==
| Canada | France | Germany | Norway |
| Parkway CC, Toronto, Ontario Skip: Alf Phillips, Jr. Third: John Ross; Second: Ron Manning; Lead: Keith Reilly | Mont d'Arbois CC, Megève Skip: Jean Albert Sulpice; Third: Maurice Sulpice; Second: Phillipe Chambat; Lead: Pierre Boan | Munchener EV, Munich Skip: David Lampl; Third: Günther Hummelt; Second: Ottmar Paebst; Lead: Rolf Klug | Geilo CC, Geilo Skip: Erling Brusletto; Third: Erland Naess; Second: Kare Oyo; Lead: Einar Rebne |
| Scotland | Sweden | Switzerland | United States |
| Kilgraston & Moncrieffe CC, Perth Skip: Chuck Hay; Third: John Bryden; Second: Alan Glen; Lead: David Howie | Fjällgårdens CK, Stockholm Skip: Bob Woods; Third: Totte Åkerlund; Second: Bengt af Kleen; Lead: Ove Söderström | Thun CC, Thun Skip: Franz Marti; Third: Ueli Stauffer; Second: Peter Staudenmann; Lead: Kurt Maier | Seattle CC, Seattle, Washington Skip: Bruce Roberts; Third: Tom Fitzpatrick; Second: John Wright; Lead: Doug Walker |

== Standings ==
| Country | Skip | W | L |
|---|---|---|---|
| United States | Bruce Roberts | 7 | 0 |
| Canada | Alf Phillips, Jr. | 6 | 1 |
| Scotland | Chuck Hay | 5 | 2 |
| Sweden | Bob Woods | 4 | 3 |
| Norway | Erling Brusletto | 2 | 5 |
| France | Jean Albert Sulpice | 2 | 5 |
| Germany | David Lampl | 1 | 6 |
| Switzerland | Franz Marti | 1 | 6 |

== Results ==
=== Draw 1 ===
| Team | 1 | 2 | 3 | 4 | 5 | 6 | 7 | 8 | 9 | 10 | 11 | 12 | Final |
| Canada (Phillips) | 0 | 0 | 0 | 1 | 2 | 0 | 1 | 2 | 0 | 0 | 0 | 1 | 7 |
| Sweden (Woods) | 0 | 1 | 0 | 0 | 0 | 1 | 0 | 0 | 1 | 1 | 1 | 0 | 5 |

| Team | Final |
| United States (Roberts) | 17 |
| France (Sulpice) | 5 |

| Team | Final |
| Scotland (Hay) | 34 |
| Germany (Lampl) | 0 |

| Team | Final |
| Switzerland (Marti) | 9 |
| Norway (Brusletto) | 10 |

=== Draw 2 ===
| Team | 1 | 2 | 3 | 4 | 5 | 6 | 7 | 8 | 9 | 10 | 11 | 12 | Final |
| Canada (Phillips) | 0 | 0 | 2 | 1 | 0 | 4 | 1 | 2 | 1 | 0 | 2 | 0 | 13 |
| Switzerland (Marti) | 1 | 0 | 0 | 0 | 0 | 0 | 0 | 0 | 0 | 1 | 0 | 1 | 3 |

| Team | Final |
| United States (Roberts) | 8 |
| Scotland (Hay) | 7 |

| Team | Final |
| Sweden (Woods) | 16 |
| France (Sulpice) | 5 |

| Team | Final |
| Germany (Lampl) | 9 |
| Norway (Brusletto) | 8 |

=== Draw 3 ===
| Team | 1 | 2 | 3 | 4 | 5 | 6 | 7 | 8 | 9 | 10 | 11 | 12 | Final |
| Canada (Phillips) | 0 | 1 | 2 | 0 | 2 | 2 | 0 | 2 | 3 | 0 | 5 | 0 | 17 |
| Norway (Brusletto) | 2 | 0 | 0 | 1 | 0 | 0 | 1 | 0 | 0 | 2 | 0 | 2 | 8 |

| Team | Final |
| United States (Roberts) | 11 |
| Germany (Lampl) | 4 |

| Team | Final |
| Scotland (Hay) | 21 |
| France (Sulpice) | 7 |

| Team | Final |
| Sweden (Woods) | 21 |
| Switzerland (Marti) | 1 |

=== Draw 4 ===
| Team | Final |
| Canada (Phillips) | 17 |
| Germany (Lampl) | 3 |

| Team | Final |
| France (Sulpice) | 11 |
| Switzerland (Marti) | 7 |

| Team | Final |
| Scotland (Hay) | 13 |
| Sweden (Woods) | 7 |

| Team | Final |
| United States (Roberts) | 13 |
| Norway (Brusletto) | 7 |

=== Draw 5 ===
| Team | Final |
| United States (Roberts) | 12 |
| Canada (Phillips) | 5 |

| Team | Final |
| Sweden (Woods) | 12 |
| Germany (Lampl) | 7 |

| Team | Final |
| Scotland (Hay) | 19 |
| Switzerland (Marti) | 6 |

| Team | Final |
| Norway (Brusletto) | 13 |
| France (Sulpice) | 8 |

=== Draw 6 ===
| Team | Final |
| United States (Roberts) | 12 |
| Sweden (Woods) | 4 |

| Team | Final |
| Canada (Phillips) | 17 |
| France (Sulpice) | 4 |

| Team | Final |
| Scotland (Hay) | 13 |
| Norway (Brusletto) | 3 |

| Team | Final |
| Switzerland (Marti) | 15 |
| Germany (Lampl) | 6 |

=== Draw 7 ===
| Team | Final |
| Canada (Phillips) | 7 |
| Scotland (Hay) | 6 |

| Team | Final |
| United States (Roberts) | 14 |
| Switzerland (Marti) | 6 |

| Team | Final |
| Sweden (Woods) | 9 |
| Norway (Brusletto) | 5 |

| Team | Final |
| France (Sulpice) | 11 |
| Germany (Lampl) | 10 |

== Playoffs ==
Semi-final
1 | United States | 6
4 | Sweden | 7
2 | Canada | 5
3 | Scotland | 8

Final
4 | Sweden | 5
3 | Scotland | 8

=== Semifinals ===
| Team | Final |
| United States (Roberts) | 6 |
| Sweden (Woods) | 7 |

| Team | Final |
| Canada (Phillips) | 5 |
| Scotland (Hay) | 8 |

=== Final ===
| Team | Final |
| Sweden (Woods) | 5 |
| Scotland (Hay) | 8 |

1967 Scotch Cup Winners
(Scotland)
Scotland
1st title
