= Chuck Hay =

Scottish curler

- Curler
- Born: 23 April 1930
- Died: 4 August 2017 (aged 87)

Team
- Curling club: Kilgraston & Moncrieffe
- Skip: Chuck Hay
- Third: John Bryden
- Second: Alan Glen
- Lead: David Howie
- Alternate: Jimmy Hamilton

Curling career
- World Championship: 5 (1963, 1965, 1966, 1967, 1968)
Medal record
Representing Scotland
Men's Curling
World Men's Championship
Gold medal – first place	1967 Perth
Silver medal – second place	1963 Perth
Silver medal – second place	1966 Vancouver
Silver medal – second place	1968 Point-Claire
Scottish Men's Championship
Gold medal – first place	1963
Gold medal – first place	1965
Gold medal – first place	1966
Gold medal – first place	1967
Gold medal – first place	1968
Silver medal – second place	1964 Edinburgh

Charles Hay, MBE (23 April 1930 – 4 August 2017) was a Scottish curler and World Champion. He skipped the Scottish team that won the 1967 World Curling Championships, known then as the Scotch Cup. The other members of the Scottish team were John Bryden, Alan Glen and Dave Howie. They defeated Sweden in the final. Scotland did not win another men's world title until 1991 when David Smith's rink (including Chuck's eldest son David) beat Canada in Winnipeg.

Hay was made an MBE in 1977 for his promotion of curling. In 2011, he received the Elmer Freytag Award for services to curling and was inducted into the World Curling Federation Hall of Fame in 2012.

Hay worked as a farmer in Perthshire.

== Teams ==
Season	Skip	Third	Second	Lead	Events
1962–63	Chuck Hay	John Bryden	Alan Glen	Jimmy Hamilton	SMCC 1963 (gold); WMCC 1963 (silver)
1964–65	Chuck Hay	John Bryden	Alan Glen	David Howie	SMCC 1965 (gold); WMCC 1965 (4th)
1965–66	Chuck Hay	John Bryden	Alan Glen	David Howie	SMCC 1966 (gold); WMCC 1966 (silver)
1966–67	Chuck Hay	John Bryden	Alan Glen	David Howie	SMCC 1967 (gold); WMCC 1967 (gold)
1967–68	Chuck Hay	John Bryden	Alan Glen	David Howie	SMCC 1968 (gold); WMCC 1968 (silver)
1975–76	Chuck Hay	John Bryden	Alex Young	Morris Morton	
