= Roy Sinclair (curler) =

Scottish male curler (1928–2025)

- Curler ♂
- Born: 14 June 1928; Glencarse, Perthshire, Scotland
- Died: 2 April 2025 (aged 96); Pitlochry, Perthshire, Scotland

Team
- Curling club: St. Martins CC, Perth

Curling career
- Member Association: Scotland
- World Championship: 1 (1976)
Medal record
Curling
World Championship
Silver medal – second place	1976 Duluth
Scottish Men's Championship
Gold medal – first place	1976

Gilroy Sinclair (14 June 1928 – 2 April 2025) was a Scottish curler.

Sinclair was a 1976 World Men's silver medallist and 1976 Scottish men's champion. He served as president of the Royal Caledonian Curling Club, the national governing body for curling in Scotland from 1989 to 1990. From 2000 to 2006, he was the president of the World Curling Federation.

Sinclair was the author of the book Curling Basics: A Comprehensive Guide to the Game of Curling.

== Background ==
Sinclair was born in Glencarse, Perthshire on 14 June 1928. He worked as an engineer with the LMS Railway Company in Perth and for the Ministry of Defence as an engineering manager at Almondbank. Sinclair died on 2 April 2025, at the age of 96.

== Awards ==
- World Curling Freytag Award: 2007
- In 2012 he was inducted to World Curling Federation Hall of Fame

== Teams ==
Season	Skip	Third	Second	Lead	Events
1975–76	Bill Muirhead	Derek Scott	Len Dudman	Roy Sinclair	SMCC 1976 (gold); WMCC 1976 (silver)
1983–84	Bill Muirhead	Tom Muirhead	Roy Sinclair	John Bryden	SSCC 1984 (gold)
1984–85	Bill Muirhead	Tom Muirhead	Roy Sinclair	John Bryden	SSCC 1985 (gold)
1985–86	Bill Muirhead	Tom Muirhead	Roy Sinclair	John Bryden	SSCC 1986 (gold)
1986–87	Bill Muirhead	Tom Muirhead	Roy Sinclair	John Bryden	SSCC 1987 (gold)
1987–88	Bill Muirhead	John Bryden	Roy Sinclair	Jim McArthur	SSCC 1988 (gold)
