= Ove Söderström =

Swedish male curler

- Curler ♂
- Born: 8 March 1939 (age 87)

Team
- Curling club: Fjällgårdens CK, Stockholm

Curling career
- Member Association: Sweden
- World Championship: 1 (1967)
Medal record
Curling
World Championships
| Silver medal – second place | 1967 Perth |
Swedish Men's Championship
| Gold medal – first place | 1967 |

Ove Söderström (born 8 March 1939) is a Swedish curler.

He is a 1967 World Men's silver medallist and a 1967 Swedish men's curling champion.

== Teams ==
| Season | Skip | Third | Second | Lead | Events |
|---|---|---|---|---|---|
| 1966–67 | Bob Woods | Totte Åkerlund | Bengt af Kleen | Ove Söderström | SMCC 1967 (gold); WCC 1967 (silver) |
