= Bruce Roberts (curler) =

American curler (1942–2022)

- Curler ♂
- Born: June 23, 1942
- Died: December 30, 2022 (aged 80)

Team
- Curling club: Fargo CC, Seattle CC, Hibbing CC

Curling career
- Member Association: United States
- World Championship: 5 (1966, 1967, 1976, 1977, 1984)
Medal record
Curling
World Championships
Gold medal – first place	1976 Duluth
Bronze medal – third place	1966 Vancouver
Bronze medal – third place	1967 Perth
United States Men's Championship
Gold medal – first place	1966 Hibbing
Gold medal – first place	1967 Winchester
Gold medal – first place	1976 Wausau
Gold medal – first place	1977 Northbrook
Gold medal – first place	1984 Hibbing

Bruce Edward Roberts (June 23, 1942 – December 30, 2022) was an American curler from Hibbing, Minnesota. Roberts won the 1976 World men's curling championship and was a five-time United States men's curling champion (1966, 1967, 1976, 1977, 1984).

== Awards ==
- United States Curling Association Hall of Fame:
  - 1988 (as curler);
  - 1994 (with all 1976 world champions team: third Joe Roberts, second Gary Kleffman and lead Jerry Scott).

== Personal life and death ==
Bruce Roberts was employed as a primary school teacher. His younger brother, Joe, was a curler too and Bruce's teammate.

Roberts lived in Orr, Minnesota, and attended Bemidji State University. He taught in Duluth and Nett Lake. Roberts had two children.

Roberts died on December 30, 2022, at the age of 80.

== Teams ==
Season	Skip	Third	Second	Lead	Alternate	Events
1964–65	Bruce Roberts	Jay Thorseth	Sibley Stewart	Roy Wallace		USMCC 1965
1965–66	Bruce Roberts	Joe Zbacnik	Gerry Toutant	Mike O'Leary		USMCC 1966 (gold); WCC 1966 (bronze)
1966–67	Bruce Roberts	Tom Fitzpatrick	John Wright	Doug Walker		USMCC 1967 (gold); WCC 1967 (bronze) (Note: Wrong "4th place" in WCF database: both USA and Canada lost in semifinals, no "bronze" match.)
1974–75	Bruce Roberts	Joe Roberts	Gary Kleffman	Jerry Scott		USMCC 1975
1975–76	Bruce Roberts	Joe Roberts	Gary Kleffman	Jerry Scott		USMCC 1976 (gold); WCC 1976 (gold)
1976–77	Bruce Roberts	Paul Pustovar; Joe Roberts	Gary Kleffman	Jerry Scott		USMCC 1977 (gold); WCC 1977 (4th)
1977–78	Bruce Roberts	Joe Roberts	Gary Kleffman	Jerry Scott		USMCC 1978
1982–83	Scott Baird	Bruce Roberts	Gary Kleffman	Mark Haluptzok	Craig Polski	USMCC 1983 (5th)
1983–84	Joe Roberts (fourth)	Bruce Roberts (skip)	Gary Kleffman	Jerry Scott		USMCC 1984 (gold); WCC 1984 (6th)
