= David Howie (curler) =

Scottish curler

- Curler

Team
- Curling club: Kilgraston & Moncrieffe, Perth
- Skip: Chuck Hay
- Third: John Bryden
- Second: Alan Glen
- Lead: David Howie

Curling career
- Member Association: Scotland
- World Championship: 4 (1965, 1966, 1967, 1968)
Medal record
Curling
World Men's Championship
Gold medal – first place	1967 Perth
Silver medal – second place	1966 Vancouver
Silver medal – second place	1968 Point-Claire
Scottish Men's Championship
Gold medal – first place	1965
Gold medal – first place	1966
Gold medal – first place	1967
Gold medal – first place	1968

David Howie (born c. 1927) is a Scottish curler.

He played lead on Chuck Hay's team out of the Kilgraston & Moncrieffe Curling Club in Perth, Scotland during a very successful run in the 1960s. The team won the Scottish Men's Championship four years in a row, earning them the right to represent Scotland at the World Curling Championships in those years. At World's in 1966 and 1968 The Hay rink took home the silver medal, with Canada winning the Championship each of those years. At the 1967 World Men's Championship they defeated Team Sweden, skipped by Bob Woods, in the final to win Scotland's first World Men's Championship.

Howie worked as a farmer in Perthshire.

== Teams ==
Season	Skip	Third	Second	Lead	Events
1964–65	Chuck Hay	John Bryden	Alan Glen	David Howie	1965 SMCC (gold); 1965 WMCC (4th)
1965–66	Chuck Hay	John Bryden	Alan Glen	David Howie	1966 SMCC (gold); 1966 WMCC (silver)
1966–67	Chuck Hay	John Bryden	Alan Glen	David Howie	1967 SMCC (gold); 1967 WMCC (gold)
1967–68	Chuck Hay	John Bryden	Alan Glen	David Howie	1968 SMCC (gold); 1968 WMCC (silver)
1987–88	Grant McPherson	R. Gray	David Howie	Robert Wilson	Edinburgh Int'l (gold)
