= Graham Cormack =

Scottish male curler

- Curler ♂

Team
- Curling club: St. Martins CC, Perth

Curling career
- Member Association: Scotland
- World Championship: 1 (2003)
- European Championship: 2 (2002)
Medal record
Curling
Scottish Men's Championship
Gold medal – first place	2002

Graham Cormack is a Scottish male curler.

At the national level, he is a 2002 Scottish men's champion curler.

Since 2020 he has been a Board Member of British Curling.

== Teams ==
Season	Skip	Third	Second	Lead	Alternate	Coach	Events
2001–02	Peter Smith	David Hay	Graham Cormack	Steve Rankin			SMCC 2002 (gold)
2002–03	Peter Smith	David Hay	Graham Cormack	Steve Rankin	Warwick Smith	Derek Brown	ECC 2002 (6th)
2002–03	Warwick Smith	Peter Smith	Ewan MacDonald	David Hay	Graham Cormack	Derek Brown	WCC 2003 (7th)
2013–14	Graham Shaw	Brian Binnie	Graham Cormack	Robin Niven			
2014–15	Graham Shaw	Brian Binnie	Graham Cormack	Robin Niven			
2015–16	Graham Shaw	Brian Binnie	Graham Cormack	Robin Niven			
2017–18	Graham Shaw	Brian Binnie	Graham Cormack	Robin Niven			SMCC 2018 (10th)
