= Alex Young (curler) =

Scottish curler

- Curler ♂

Team
- Curling club: St. Martins CC, Perth

Curling career
- Member Association: Scotland
- World Championship: 1 (1969)
Medal record
Curling
World Championship
Bronze medal – third place	1969 Perth
Scottish Men's Championship
Gold medal – first place	1969

Alex Young is a Scottish curler.

He is a 1969 world men's bronze medallist and 1969 Scottish men's champion.

== Teams ==
Season	Skip	Third	Second	Lead	Alternate	Events
1968–69	Bill Muirhead	George Haggart	Derek Scott	Alex Young	Murray Melville (WMCC)	SMCC 1969 (gold); WMCC 1969 (bronze)
1975–76	Chuck Hay	John Bryden	Alex Young	Morris Morton		
