= Günther Hummelt =

Austrian curler (1931–2010)

- Curler
- Born: 21 July 1931; Innsbruck, Austria
- Died: 3 July 2010 (aged 78); Munich, Germany

Curling career
- World Championship: 2 (1967, 1984)

Günther Hummelt (21 July 1931 – 3 July 2010) was an Austrian curler and curling coach who contributed greatly to the development of the sport of curling. Most notably, he served as the first president of the World Curling Federation following its succession of the International Curling Federation, which Hummelt was also a part of, and served as president of the Austrian Curling Association from 1980 to 2010.

In 2012, Hummelt was posthumously inducted into the WCF Hall of Fame.

== Career ==
=== Playing career ===
Hummelt first came out onto the world stage in the 1967 Scotch Cup as the third for the German team skipped by David Lampl. Germany finished tied for last after the round robin. Hummelt then participated in the 1984 Air Canada Silver Broom as the alternate for the Austrian team, which finished the round robin without a win.

=== Coaching career ===
Hummelt coached Austria at two events in the 2000s. He coached the Austrian junior men's team at the B tournament of the 2004 World Junior Curling Championships to a seventh-place finish, and coached the Austrian junior women's team at the 2005 European Junior Curling Challenge to a fifth-place finish.

== Contributions to curling ==
=== Curling in Germany and Austria ===
Hummelt became a founding member of several curling clubs in Austria, including his home club, the Kitzbühel Curling Club in Kitzbühel. He also founded the first curling club in Munich, Germany.

He became the president of the Austrian Curling Association at the time of its formation in 1980, and held this post until his death.

=== World Curling Federation ===
Hummelt first joined the World Curling Federation as president of the Austrian Curling Association in 1982, which was known as the International Curling Federation (ICF) at the time. In 1988, he was elected the vice-president of the ICF, and was later elected the president of the ICF in 1990. The ICF was renamed as the World Curling Federation in 1991, and Hummelt served as president of the World Curling Federation for a ten-year tenure, which ended in 2000 when he retired. Following his retirement, Hummelt was named as the first Honorary President of the World Curling Federation in recognition of his contributions. Hummelt continued to serve as Austria's representative to the World Curling Federation until his death.

=== Curling as an Olympic sport ===
Hummelt led a World Curling Federation committee that lobbied for the sport of curling to become an Olympic sport. After much effort, the International Olympic Committee approved curling's bid for Olympic sport status, and curling made its debut as an official Olympic sport in 1998 at the Nagano Winter Olympics.

== Death ==
Hummelt fell ill shortly before his death. He died peacefully at the age of 78.
