= Tom Fitzpatrick (curler) =

American curler

- Curler ♂

Team
- Curling club: Seattle CC

Curling career
- Member Association: United States
- World Championship: 1 (1967)
Medal record
Curling
World Championships
Bronze medal – third place	1967 Perth
United States Men's Championship
Gold medal – first place	1967 Winchester

Tom Fitzpatrick (born c. 1939 in North Dakota) is an American curler.

He is a 1967 World Men's bronze medallist and a 1967 United States men's curling champion.

== Personal life ==
At the time of the 1967 US Championship, Fitzpatrick was a tool and dye maker in an aircraft plant.

== Teams ==
Season	Skip	Third	Second	Lead	Events
1966–67	Bruce Roberts	Tom Fitzpatrick	John Wright	Doug Walker	USMCC 1967 (gold); WCC 1967 (bronze) (Note: Wrong "4th place" in WCF database: both USA and Canada lost in semifinals, no "bronze" match.)
