= Jimmy Hamilton (curler) =

Scottish curler

- Curler

Team
- Curling club: Kilgraston & Moncrieffe
- Skip: Chuck Hay
- Third: John Bryden
- Second: Alan Glen
- Lead: Jimmy Hamilton

Curling career
- World Championship: 1 (1963)
Medal record
Representing Scotland
Men's Curling
World Men's Championship
Silver medal – second place	1963 Perth
Scottish Men's Championship
Gold medal – first place	1963

James Hamilton is a Scottish curler. Hamilton played lead on Chuck Hay's team from the Kilgraston & Moncrieffe Curling Club in Perth, Scotland during the 1963 World Curling Championships known as the Scotch Cup. The team finished second out of the four teams that participated that year.

== Teams ==
Season	Skip	Third	Second	Lead	Events
1962–63	Chuck Hay	John Bryden	Alan Glen	Jimmy Hamilton	SMCC 1963 (gold); WMCC 1963 (silver)
