= Billy Howat =

Scottish curler

- Curler ♂

Team
- Curling club: Ayr CC (Ayr)

Curling career
- Member Association: Scotland
- World Championship: 1 (1985)
- European Championship: 1 (1985)
Medal record
Curling
Scottish Men's Championship
Gold medal – first place	1985 Kirkcaldy

Billy Howat is a Scottish curler.

At the national level, he is a 1985 Scottish men's champion curler.

In 2015–2016 he was president of the Royal Caledonian Curling Club (Scottish Curling Association). Some years before it he was president of the Ayr Curling Club.

== Teams ==
Season	Skip	Third	Second	Lead	Events
1984–85	Billy Howat	Robert Clark	Robert Shaw	Alistair Henry	SMCC 1985 (gold); WCC 1985 (5th)
1985–86	Billy Howat	Robert Clark	Robert Shaw	Alistair Henry	ECC 1985 (6th)
