= Totte Åkerlund =

Swedish curler

- Curler ♂
- Born: 6 March 1915
- Died: 16 March 2009 (aged 94)

Team
- Curling club: Fjällgårdens CK, Stockholm

Curling career
- Member Association: Sweden
- World Championship: 1 (1967)
Medal record
Curling
World Championships
Silver medal – second place	1967 Perth
Swedish Men's Championship
Gold medal – first place	1947
Gold medal – first place	1951
Gold medal – first place	1959
Gold medal – first place	1967

Erik "Totte" Åkerlund (6 March 1915 – 16 March 2009) was a Swedish curler.

He was a 1967 World Men's silver medallist and a four-time Swedish men's curling champion (1947, 1951, 1959, 1967).

He was also a curling activist, in the years 1953-1970 he sat on the board of the Swedish Federation of Curling, additionally he served as treasurer (1954-1956), vice president (1963-1966) and from 1970 to 1972 president.

In 1966 he was inducted into the Swedish Curling Hall of Fame.

Totte was also active in the squash environment. Initially, a playing field was organized in his house (Villa Åkerlund, now the seat of the US embassy). In 1946 he was one of the founders of Stockholms Squashklubb, the first Swedish club. He took part in international matches, among others with England and Denmark and also won the unofficial national championship of Group B in 1943. He also practiced golf until late old age.

== Teams ==
Season	Skip	Third	Second	Lead	Events
1946–47	Bertel Skiöld	Erik Åkerlund	Olle Hammarström	Arthur Ballin	SMCC 1947 (gold)
1950–51	Bertel Skiöld	Totte Åkerlund	Olle Hammarström	Arthur Ballin	SMCC 1951 (gold)
1958–59	Per Eric Nilsson	Sven Eklund	Totte Åkerlund	Lars Ryberg	SMCC 1959 (gold)
1966–67	Bob Woods	Totte Åkerlund	Bengt af Kleen	Ove Söderström	SMCC 1967 (gold); WCC 1967 (silver)

== Personal life ==
Totte grew up in family of curlers: his father Erik Åkerlund was a four-time Swedish men's curling champion in 1920–1930s, and his brother (Totte's uncle) Rune was also a curler and 1932 Swedish men's curling champion.
