= Phil Wilson (curler) =

Scottish curler

Phil Wilson (born 14 September 1965) is a Scottish curler from Stranraer. Wilson played for Great Britain at the 1998 Winter Olympics in Nagano, Japan.
