= Bob Woods (curler) =

Canadian-Swedish male curler

- Curler ♂
- Born: September 2, 1933 (age 93); Canada

Team
- Curling club: Fjällgårdens CK, Stockholm; Royals, Toronto; Humber Highland, Toronto

Curling career
- Member Association: Sweden; Ontario
- World Championship: 1 (1967)
Medal record
Curling
World Championships
Silver medal – second place	1967 Perth
Swedish Men's Championship
Gold medal – first place	1967

Robert Woods (born September 2, 1933 in Canada) is a Canadian-Swedish curler.

He is a 1967 World Men's silver medallist and a 1967 Swedish men's curling champion.

He introduced the long slide in Swedish curling in the 1960s.

== Teams ==
Season	Skip	Third	Second	Lead	Events
1966–67	Bob Woods	Totte Åkerlund	Bengt af Kleen	Ove Söderström	SMCC 1967 (gold); WCC 1967 (silver)
1969–70	Bob Woods	?	?	?	Ont. 1970
1971–72	Bob Woods	Neil Harrison	Peter Krivel	Jim Hedrich	Ont. 1972 (silver)

=== Mixed ===
Season	Skip	Third	Second	Lead	Events
1976–77	Bob Woods	Carol Thompson	Bill Schultz	Eileen Appleton	CMxCC 1977
