= Leonard Dudman =

Scottish cricketer and curler

Personal information
- Full name: Leonard Charles Dudman
- Born: 4 August 1933; Dundee, Scotland
- Died: 12 February 2004 (aged 70); Dundee, Scotland
- Batting: Right-handed
- Role: Batsman

Domestic team information
- Years: Team
- 1955–1968: Scotland
- First-class debut: 23 July 1955 Scotland v Ireland
- Last First-class: 14 August 1968 Scotland v Warwickshire

Career statistics
Competition	FC
Matches	35
Runs scored	1286
Batting average	22.17
100s/50s	1/5
Top score	161
Catches/stumpings	20/0
- Source: CricketArchive, 20 November 2011

Leonard Dudman
Medal record

Representing Scotland

Men's Curling

World championships
Silver medal – second place	1976 Duluth	Team

Leonard Charles Dudman (4 August 1933 – 12 February 2004) was a Scottish international cricketer who also represented his country in curling and Junior football.

A right-handed batsman, he made his highest first-class score of 161 against Warwickshire in July 1956. He was prolific for Perthshire in Scottish domestic cricket, managing 11130 runs.

As a footballer, Dudman was capped once for the Scotland Junior international team in February 1956 whilst playing for Coupar Angus and subsequently stepped up to play for Falkirk and Forfar Athletic.

In later years, he was part of Bill Muirhead's rink from St. Martin's CC in Perth who won the silver medal in the 1976 World Curling Championships.

== See also ==
- List of Scottish cricket and football players
