= Hammy McMillan =

Scottish curler (born 1963)

- Curler
- Born: Hamilton McMillan; 13 July 1963 (age 63); Stranraer, Scotland

Team
- Skip: Hammy McMillan
- Third: David Smith
- Second: Ross Paterson
- Lead: Sandy Gilmore

Curling career
- World Championship: 5 (1986, 1987, 1992, 1997, 1999)
- European Championship: 8 (1989, 1993, 1994, 1995, 1996, 1999, 2001, 2010)
- Olympic: 3 (1988, 1992, 2002)
- Other appearances: World Senior Curling Championships: 1 (2024)
Medal record
Men's curling
Representing Scotland
World Championships
Gold medal – first place	1999 Saint John	Team
Silver medal – second place	1986 Vancouver	Team
Silver medal – second place	1992 Garmisch-Partenkirchen	Team
Bronze medal – third place	1997 Berne	Team
European Championships
Gold medal – first place	1989 Engelberg	Team
Gold medal – first place	1994 Sundsvall	Team
Gold medal – first place	1995 Grindelweld	Team
Gold medal – first place	1996 Copenhagen	Team
Gold medal – first place	1999 Chamonix	Team

Hamilton McMillan (born 13 July 1963) is a Scottish curler. He won a gold medal as skip for the Scottish team at the 1999 World Curling Championships in Saint John, New Brunswick. He has won five gold medals at the European Curling Championships. He played third for the Tom Brewster rink before forming his own team.

He competed for Great Britain at the 1992 Winter Olympics and the 2002 Winter Olympics.

His son, Hammy McMillan Jr., is also a competitive curler.
