= David Hay (curler) =

Scottish curler

Medal record

Curling

World Championships
Gold medal – first place	1991 Winnipeg	
Silver medal – second place	1990 Västerås	
Silver medal – second place	1993 Geneva	
Silver medal – second place	1996 Hamilton	
Bronze medal – third place	1988 Lausanne	

World Junior Championships
Bronze medal – third place	1983 Medicine Hat	

European Championships
Gold medal – first place	1982 Kirkcaldy	
Gold medal – first place	1988 Perth	
Silver medal – second place	1991 Chamonix	
Silver medal – second place	1998 Flims	
Silver medal – second place	2006 Basel	
Bronze medal – third place	1983 Västerås	
Bronze medal – third place	1992 Perth	

European Mixed Curling Championship
Gold medal – first place	2006 Claut	

David Hay (born 23 February 1962) is a Scottish curler.

Hay started curling in 1975. He plays in second or third position and is right-handed. During his career he won many prizes, but never featured on the Winter Olympics.

Hay coached the Great Britain Women's curling team to the bronze medal at the 2014 Winter Olympics.
