= Don Rudd =

Canadian male curler

- Curler ♂
- Born: June 13, 1950; Morden, Manitoba
- Died: December 4, 2023; Winnipeg, Manitoba

Team
- Curling club: Granite CC, Winnipeg, MB

Curling career
- Member Association: Manitoba
- Brier: 3: (1992, 1993, 1997)
- World Championship: 1 (1992)
Medal record
Curling
Representing Canada
World Championships
Bronze medal – third place	1992 Garmisch-Partenkirchen
Representing Manitoba
Labatt Brier
Gold medal – first place	1992 Regina
Silver medal – second place	1997 Calgary

Donald Stuart Rudd (June 13, 1950 - December 4, 2023) was a Canadian curler.

Rudd was the child of Ray and Velma Rudd.

He was a 1992 World Men's bronze medallist and a 1992 Labatt Brier champion.

He started curling in 1960 when he was 10 years old.

In 2005 he was inducted in the Manitoba Curling Association Hall of Fame with all of the 1992 and 1993 Vic Peters' champions team.

== Personal life ==
Rudd was married to Eleanor Oakes, and had two children. He worked for Manitoba Hydro for 37 years. He died at the St. Boniface General Hospital.

== Teams ==
Season	Skip	Third	Second	Lead	Alternate	Events
1991–92	Vic Peters	Dan Carey	Chris Neufeld	Don Rudd	John Loxton (Brier)	Brier 1992 (gold); WCC 1992 (bronze)
1992–93	Vic Peters	Dan Carey	Chris Neufeld	Don Rudd	John Loxton	Brier 1993 (4th)
1994–95	Vic Peters	Dan Carey	Chris Neufeld	Don Rudd		
1995–96	Arnold Asham	David Nedohin	Sean Nedohin	Don Rudd		
1996–97	Vic Peters	Dan Carey	Chris Neufeld	Scott Grant	Don Rudd	Brier 1997 (silver)
1999–00	John Bubbs	Bob Jenion	Dan Keisch	Don Rudd		
2000–01	John Bubbs	Bob Jenion	Don Rudd	Dan Keisch		
