= Canadian Masters Curling Championships =

Sporting competition

- Established: 2000
- Host city: Grande Prairie, Alberta
- Arena: Grande Prairie Curling Centre

Current champions (2026)
- Men: Ontario (Bryan Cochrane)
- Women: Ontario (Mary Chilvers)

The Canadian Masters Curling Championships are an annual curling tournament featuring Canadian provincial and territorial teams of athletes at the age of 60 years and over. The Across Canada Masters event began in 2000. Several Provinces have held Provincial Masters Championships beginning in the years around 1986. The Canadian Masters Curling Championships featured 10 end games in the years 2000-2006. From 2007, featured a switch to 8 end games and this aspect became and remains part of the standard game length format.

The Year 2010 Canadian Masters in New Brunswick implemented a shift to the double pool play format ( from a single Round Robin format) to qualify 4 teams for the final playoffs medal playoff games. From 2010 until present, 4 teams from each separate pool play and then advance to Championship pool play. This results in qualifying 4 teams for the final playoffs. Of interest is that Canadian Seniors Nationals have since adopted this format for National competition play. The 2018 Brier and 2018 Scotties National Championships are planning to follow a format similar to the Masters Model of Pool play and move away from the single Round Robin model of Canadian Championship determination.

== Past champions ==
Year	Men's winners	Women's winners	Host city - Province
2000	Ontario (Jim Sharples, Brian Longley, Joe Gurowka, Art Lobel)	Alberta (Phyl Raymond, Toni Ironside, Vida Roseboom, Jackie Ogryzlo)	Surrey, British Columbia
2001	Manitoba (Barry Fry, Don Duguid, Winston Warren, Barry Coleman)	Alberta (Shirley Tucker, Ruth Kimmitt, Lorna Priddle, Betty Jean Buchanan)	Winnipeg, Manitoba
2002	Manitoba (Ken Grove, John Usackis, Bob Lesko, Richard Schroeder)	New Brunswick (Marlene Vaughan, Ellen Brennan, Rose Donovan, Pierette MacNaughton)	Medicine Hat, Alberta
2003	Quebec (Dave Moon, Mac Baines, Bob Sunderman, Dan McConnell)	Ontario (Gloria Sorley, Jacki Lococo, Lynne Coull, Marg Newton)	Assiniboia, Saskatchewan
2004	Manitoba (Martin Bailey, John Helston, Brian Taylor, Gary Smith)	New Brunswick (Marlene Vaughan, Ellen Brennan, Sandra Franey, Fran Meehan)	Kelowna, British Columbia
2005	Manitoba (Doug Armour, Frank Gudz, Don Barr, Ken Sabaad)	Ontario (Gloria Sorley, Jacki Lococo, Lynne Coull, Marg Newton)	Brandon, Manitoba
2006	British Columbia (Dale McKenzie, Roy Giles, Sheldon Paulger, Fred Trussell)	Nova Scotia (Sue Anne Bartlett, Adine Boutilier, Carol Whitmore, Marjorie MacKay)	Bridgewater, Nova Scotia
2007	Ontario (Bob Edmondson, David Stewart, Brian Longley, Graham MacEachern)	Alberta (Linda Wagner, Sandra Turner, Marilyn Toews, Betty Clark)	Hamilton, Ontario
2008	British Columbia (Rick Pughe, John Zwarych, Jack Finnbogason, Bob Byrne)	Alberta (Mary Lynn Oates, Heather Paul-Scott, Sylvia Babich, Linda Pratt)	Nanaimo, British Columbia
2009	Manitoba (Ray Orr, Dennis Peckover, Brian Manns, John Mandrikas)	Saskatchewan (Lee Morrison, Bernice Van der Velden, Peggy Hergott, Marg Griffiths)	Saskatoon, Saskatchewan
2010	Ontario (Mike Dorey, Brian Henderson, Gary Houghton, Paul Knight)	Nova Scotia (Sue Anne Bartlett, Sharon Clarke, Marjorie MacKay, Brenda Nearing)	Saint John, New Brunswick
2011	British Columbia (Garry Gelowitz, Robb Koffski, Brad Cmolik, Dennis Case)	Manitoba (Joyce McDougall, Linda Van Daele, Cheryl Orr, Karen Dunbar)	Winnipeg, Manitoba
2012	Newfoundland and Labrador (Toby McDonald, Wayne Hamilton, Lloyd Powell, Paul Aiken)	Saskatchewan (Merle Kopach, Audrey Crosson, Linda Delver, Rae Wilson)	Boucherville & Saint-Lambert, Quebec
2013	Alberta (Harold Breckenridge, Don Hier, J. R. McDonald, Gord Dewar)	Ontario (Joyce Potter, Diana Favel, Janelle Sadler, Jennifer Langley)	Thunder Bay, Ontario
2014	Saskatchewan (Eugene Hritzuk, Jim Wilson, Verne Anderson, Dave Folk)	Saskatchewan (Merle Kopach, Audrey Crossan, Linda Delver, Janet Rooks)	Coaldale, Alberta
2015	Manitoba (Ron Westcott, Ken Dusablon, Bob Boughey, Howard Restall)	British Columbia (Karen Lepine, Susan Beuk, Agnes Sigurdson, Donna Christian )	Whitehorse, Yukon
2016	Alberta (Ed Lukowich, Jim Walsh, Don Hier, Gord Dewar)	Saskatchewan (Merle Kopach, Sylvia Johnson, Linda Delver, Trudy Dykes)	Kentville & Wolfville, Nova Scotia
2017	Northern Ontario (Al Hackner, Eric Harnden, Frank Morissette, Bruce Munro)	Saskatchewan (Delores Syrota, Bev Krasowski, Donna Liebrecht, Sylvia Broad)	Guelph, Ontario
2018	Alberta (Mickey Pendergast, Rob Armitage, Randy Ponich, Rick Hjertaas)	British Columbia (Pat Sanders, Lorraine Gagnon, Sherry Findlay, Roselyn Craig)	Surrey & White Rock, British Columbia
2019	Alberta (Mickey Pendergast, Rob Armitage, Randy Ponich, Kevin Pendergast)	Saskatchewan (Delores Syrota, Bev Krasowski, June Campbell, Sylvia Broad)	Nutana, Saskatoon, Saskatchewan
2020	Cancelled due to COVID-19		Rothesay & Saint John, New Brunswick
2021	Cancelled due to COVID-19		Rothesay & Saint John, New Brunswick
2022	Northern Ontario (Al Hackner, Eric Harnden, Frank Morissette, Bruce Munro)	British Columbia (Penny Shantz, Cindy Curtain, Shirley Wong, Janet Suter)	Pembina, Winnipeg, Manitoba
2023	Alberta (Wade White, Doug McLennan, Dan Holowaychuk, George Parsons)	British Columbia (Penny Shantz, Cindy Curtain, Shirley Wong, Janet Suter, Leslie Shearer)	Saint John, New Brunswick
2024	Ontario (Howard Rajala, Phil Daniel, Chris Fulton, Paul Madden)	British Columbia (Penny Shantz, Cindy Curtain, Danielle Shaughnessy, Donna Mychaluk)	Saguenay, Quebec
2025	Manitoba (Randy Neufeld, Dean Moxham, Dale Michie, Larry Borus)	Alberta (Debbie Santos, Jackie Rae Greening, Pauline Erickson, Lesley McEwan)	Sault Ste. Marie, Ontario
2026	Ontario (Bryan Cochrane, J.P. Lachance, John Wilson, Ken Sullivan)	Ontario (Mary Chilvers, Colleen Madonia, Kristin Turcotte, Christine Loube)	Grande Prairie, Alberta
