= 1992 Labatt Brier =

- Host city: Regina, Saskatchewan
- Arena: Agridome
- Dates: March 8–15
- Attendance: 121,555
- Winner: Manitoba
- Curling club: Granite CC, Winnipeg
- Skip: Vic Peters
- Third: Dan Carey
- Second: Chris Neufeld
- Lead: Don Rudd
- Alternate: John Loxton
- Finalist: Ontario (Russ Howard)

The 1992 Labatt Brier was held from March 8 to 15 at the Agridome in Regina, Saskatchewan.

Vic Peters of Manitoba defeated Russ Howard of Ontario in the final in an extra end to win his first and only Brier of his career. In the 9th end, Howard had a chance to get a three-ender and take a commanding 5–3 lead, but jammed his pick attempt, scoring just one, and gave Peters hammer in the 10th end, tied 3–3. In the 10th end, Peters had nearly won the game, but a measurement revealed that his hit and roll attempt rolled just outside of the rings, blanking the end. Peters finally won the game by making a hit and roll into the house on his final rock of the extra end. It was Manitoba's 23rd Brier championship, and the first since 1984. Howard was the favourite to win the event, having only lost four games all season prior to the Brier. With the win, Vic Peters and his team of Dan Carey, Chris Neufeld and Don Rudd went on to represent Canada at the 1992 World Men's Curling Championship.

== Teams ==
Alberta	British Columbia	Manitoba
Avonair CC, Edmonton Skip: Kevin Martin; Third: Kevin Park; Second: Dan Petryk; Lead: Don Bartlett; Alternate: Jules Owchar	Royal City CC, New Westminster Skip: Jim Armstrong; Third: Ron Thompson; Second: Greg Monkman; Lead: Ed Fowler; Alternate: Brad Giles	Granite CC, Winnipeg Skip: Vic Peters; Third: Dan Carey; Second: Chris Neufeld; Lead: Don Rudd; Alternate: John Loxton
New Brunswick	Newfoundland	Northern Ontario
Edmundston CC, Edmundston Skip: Mike Kennedy; Third: Brad Fitzherbert; Second: Tom Harris; Lead: Dave Coster; Alternate: Geordie McGugan	St. John's CC, St. John's Skip: Glenn Goss; Third: Geoff Cunningham; Second: John Allan; Lead: Neil Young; Alternate: Toby McDonald	Thunder Bay CC, Thunder Bay Skip: Al Hackner; Third: Larry Pineau; Second: Brian Perozak; Lead: Brian Adams; Alternate: Gordon Tribe
Nova Scotia	Ontario	Prince Edward Island
CFB Halifax CC, Halifax Skip: Dave Jones; Third: Bruce Lohnes; Second: Jeff Henderson; Lead: Vance LeCocq; Alternate: Don Cutcliffe	Penetanguishene CC, Penetanguishene Skip: Russ Howard; Third: Glenn Howard; Second: Wayne Middaugh; Lead: Peter Corner; Alternate: Larry Merkley	Crapaud CC, Crapaud Skip: Ted MacFadyen; Third: Bill MacFadyen; Second: Mike Coady; Lead: Sandy Foy; Alternate: Dave MacFadyen
Quebec	Saskatchewan	Yukon/Northwest Territories
Buckingham CC, Buckingham Skip: Ted Butler; Third: Daniel Lemery; Second: Andre Lafleur; Lead: Louis Biron; Alternate: Pierre Charette	Caledonian CC, Regina Skip: Brad Hebert; Third: Warren Sharp; Second: Bob Novakowski; Lead: Kerry Gudereit; Alternate: Jim Packet	Yellowknife CC, Yellowknife Skip: Steve Moss; Third: Derek Elkin; Second: Steve Van Dine; Lead: Clayton Ravndal; Alternate: Richard Robertson

== Map of teams ==
Provincial Winners

== Round-robin standings ==
Key
Teams to Playoffs

Province	Skip	W	L
Manitoba	Vic Peters	9	2
Ontario	Russ Howard	8	3
Alberta	Kevin Martin	8	3
Quebec	Ted Butler	7	4
Northern Ontario	Al Hackner	6	5
Newfoundland	Glenn Goss	6	5
British Columbia	Jim Armstrong	5	6
Prince Edward Island	Ted MacFadyen	5	6
Saskatchewan	Brad Hebert	5	6
New Brunswick	Mike Kennedy	3	8
Northwest Territories/Yukon	Steve Moss	3	8
Nova Scotia	Dave Jones	1	10

== Round-robin results ==
=== Draw 1 ===
Sheet A	1	2	3	4	5	6	7	8	9	10	11	Final
British Columbia (Armstrong) 🔨	1	0	1	0	0	3	0	0	1	0	1	7
New Brunswick (Kennedy)	0	1	0	0	2	0	1	0	0	2	0	6

Sheet B	1	2	3	4	5	6	7	8	9	10	11	Final
Yukon/Northwest Territories (Moss) 🔨	2	0	0	0	0	0	0	2	0	0	1	5
Nova Scotia (Jones)	0	0	0	1	0	0	1	0	1	1	0	4

Sheet C	1	2	3	4	5	6	7	8	9	10	Final
Ontario (Howard) 🔨	0	0	0	0	2	0	0	0	0	1	3
Alberta (Martin)	0	0	0	0	0	0	1	0	0	0	1

Sheet D	1	2	3	4	5	6	7	8	9	10	Final
Prince Edward Island (MacFadyen) 🔨	1	0	0	1	0	0	1	0	X	X	3
Northern Ontario (Hackner)	0	1	1	0	3	1	0	2	X	X	8

=== Draw 2 ===
Sheet A	1	2	3	4	5	6	7	8	9	10	Final
Alberta (Martin) 🔨	0	2	0	0	0	0	3	0	0	X	5
Prince Edward Island (MacFadyen)	0	0	0	0	1	0	0	0	1	X	2

Sheet B	1	2	3	4	5	6	7	8	9	10	Final
New Brunswick (Kennedy) 🔨	0	0	2	0	2	0	0	0	0	X	4
Ontario (Howard)	0	0	0	2	0	2	1	3	1	X	9

Sheet C	1	2	3	4	5	6	7	8	9	10	Final
Newfoundland (Goss) 🔨	1	0	0	1	0	0	0	1	0	X	3
Manitoba (Peters)	0	3	1	0	0	1	0	0	1	X	6

Sheet D	1	2	3	4	5	6	7	8	9	10	Final
Quebec (Butler) 🔨	2	0	2	0	0	0	2	0	2	X	8
Saskatchewan (Hebert)	0	1	0	0	0	1	0	2	0	X	4

=== Draw 3 ===
Sheet A	1	2	3	4	5	6	7	8	9	10	Final
Saskatchewan (Hebert) 🔨	1	0	1	1	0	0	0	2	0	1	6
Newfoundland (Goss)	0	2	0	0	0	0	1	0	2	0	5

Sheet B	1	2	3	4	5	6	7	8	9	10	Final
Northern Ontario (Hackner) 🔨	1	0	1	1	0	1	0	0	1	X	5
Quebec (Butler)	0	2	0	0	3	0	0	2	0	X	7

Sheet C	1	2	3	4	5	6	7	8	9	10	Final
Nova Scotia (Jones) 🔨	2	0	0	1	0	0	1	0	X	X	4
British Columbia (Armstrong)	0	0	3	0	2	2	0	0	X	X	7

Sheet D	1	2	3	4	5	6	7	8	9	10	Final
Manitoba (Peters) 🔨	0	0	0	0	3	0	0	2	0	X	5
Yukon/Northwest Territories (Moss)	0	0	1	0	0	1	1	0	0	X	3

=== Draw 4 ===
Sheet A	1	2	3	4	5	6	7	8	9	10	Final
New Brunswick (Kennedy) 🔨	2	0	3	0	0	1	0	0	2	0	8
Alberta (Martin)	0	1	0	2	1	0	4	0	0	2	10

Sheet B	1	2	3	4	5	6	7	8	9	10	Final
Ontario (Howard) 🔨	0	1	0	1	0	0	0	0	0	X	2
Prince Edward Island (MacFadyen)	1	0	3	0	0	0	0	0	1	X	5

Sheet C	1	2	3	4	5	6	7	8	9	10	Final
Northern Ontario (Hackner) 🔨	1	0	0	1	0	0	1	0	0	2	5
Saskatchewan (Hebert)	0	1	0	0	2	0	0	0	1	0	4

Sheet D	1	2	3	4	5	6	7	8	9	10	Final
Quebec (Butler) 🔨	1	0	0	3	0	0	0	1	0	X	5
Newfoundland (Goss)	0	0	3	0	1	1	0	0	2	X	7

=== Draw 5 ===
Sheet A	1	2	3	4	5	6	7	8	9	10	Final
Yukon/Northwest Territories (Moss) 🔨	0	0	2	0	2	0	0	0	2	1	7
British Columbia (Armstrong)	0	0	0	1	0	3	1	1	0	0	6

Sheet B	1	2	3	4	5	6	7	8	9	10	Final
Alberta (Martin) 🔨	2	0	2	0	0	2	0	0	1	X	7
Northern Ontario (Hackner)	0	1	0	1	1	0	1	0	0	X	4

Sheet C	1	2	3	4	5	6	7	8	9	10	Final
Nova Scotia (Jones) 🔨	2	0	0	4	2	0	2	X	X	X	10
New Brunswick (Kennedy)	0	1	0	0	0	2	0	X	X	X	3

Sheet D	1	2	3	4	5	6	7	8	9	10	Final
Saskatchewan (Hebert) 🔨	0	1	0	2	0	0	0	1	0	0	4
Manitoba (Peters)	1	0	3	0	1	0	0	0	0	1	6

=== Draw 6 ===
Sheet A	1	2	3	4	5	6	7	8	9	10	11	Final
Manitoba (Peters) 🔨	0	1	1	0	0	0	1	0	0	0	1	4
Nova Scotia (Jones)	0	0	0	1	0	1	0	0	0	1	0	3

Sheet B	1	2	3	4	5	6	7	8	9	10	Final
Newfoundland (Goss) 🔨	0	2	0	1	0	1	1	0	2	0	7
Yukon/Northwest Territories (Moss)	0	0	2	0	1	0	0	2	0	1	6

Sheet C	1	2	3	4	5	6	7	8	9	10	Final
Prince Edward Island (MacFadyen) 🔨	1	0	1	0	1	0	1	0	0	X	4
Quebec (Butler)	0	2	0	1	0	3	0	1	1	X	8

Sheet D	1	2	3	4	5	6	7	8	9	10	Final
British Columbia (Armstrong) 🔨	4	0	1	2	1	X	X	X	X	X	8
Ontario (Howard)	0	1	0	0	0	X	X	X	X	X	1

=== Draw 7 ===
Sheet A	1	2	3	4	5	6	7	8	9	10	Final
Saskatchewan (Hebert) 🔨	0	0	0	1	3	0	0	2	0	0	6
Yukon/Northwest Territories (Moss)	0	0	1	0	0	0	1	0	2	1	5

Sheet B	1	2	3	4	5	6	7	8	9	10	Final
Quebec (Butler) 🔨	3	0	0	2	0	3	0	0	0	X	8
Manitoba (Peters)	0	2	1	0	1	0	0	1	0	X	5

Sheet C	1	2	3	4	5	6	7	8	9	10	Final
Newfoundland (Goss) 🔨	0	2	0	0	0	0	1	1	0	X	4
Nova Scotia (Jones)	0	0	0	1	1	0	0	0	1	X	3

Sheet D	1	2	3	4	5	6	7	8	9	10	Final
British Columbia (Armstrong) 🔨	0	1	0	0	2	0	0	0	1	0	4
Alberta (Martin)	0	0	1	0	0	2	2	0	0	1	6

=== Draw 8 ===
Sheet A	1	2	3	4	5	6	7	8	9	10	Final
Northern Ontario (Hackner) 🔨	1	0	0	1	1	0	4	0	2	X	9
Newfoundland (Goss)	0	0	1	0	0	1	0	2	0	X	4

Sheet B	1	2	3	4	5	6	7	8	9	10	Final
Yukon/Northwest Territories (Moss) 🔨	0	0	0	1	0	0	0	0	0	X	1
New Brunswick (Kennedy)	1	0	0	0	0	2	0	0	0	X	3

Sheet C	1	2	3	4	5	6	7	8	9	10	Final
Prince Edward Island (MacFadyen) 🔨	0	0	0	1	0	2	0	0	0	0	3
Saskatchewan (Hebert)	0	0	0	0	2	0	1	1	0	1	5

Sheet D	1	2	3	4	5	6	7	8	9	10	Final
Nova Scotia (Jones) 🔨	0	0	1	0	0	0	0	X	X	X	1
Ontario (Howard)	1	1	0	1	1	1	2	X	X	X	7

=== Draw 9 ===
Sheet A	1	2	3	4	5	6	7	8	9	10	Final
Alberta (Martin) 🔨	2	0	3	0	3	X	X	X	X	X	8
Quebec (Butler)	0	1	0	1	0	X	X	X	X	X	2

Sheet B	1	2	3	4	5	6	7	8	9	10	Final
Ontario (Howard) 🔨	1	0	1	0	2	1	0	1	X	X	6
Northern Ontario (Hackner)	0	1	0	1	0	0	1	0	X	X	3

Sheet C	1	2	3	4	5	6	7	8	9	10	Final
Manitoba (Peters) 🔨	0	2	0	1	0	1	0	2	0	1	7
British Columbia (Armstrong)	0	0	2	0	1	0	1	0	1	0	5

Sheet D	1	2	3	4	5	6	7	8	9	10	Final
New Brunswick (Kennedy) 🔨	0	1	3	0	2	0	1	0	0	X	7
Prince Edward Island (MacFadyen)	1	0	0	2	0	1	0	1	0	X	5

=== Draw 10 ===
Sheet A	1	2	3	4	5	6	7	8	9	10	Final
Manitoba (Peters) 🔨	0	0	0	3	0	0	1	1	0	X	5
New Brunswick (Kennedy)	0	0	0	0	1	0	0	0	1	X	2

Sheet B	1	2	3	4	5	6	7	8	9	10	Final
Saskatchewan (Hebert) 🔨	0	0	3	0	0	2	0	2	X	X	7
Nova Scotia (Jones)	0	0	0	1	0	0	2	0	X	X	3

Sheet C	1	2	3	4	5	6	7	8	9	10	Final
Quebec (Butler) 🔨	2	2	0	1	1	0	2	X	X	X	8
Yukon/Northwest Territories (Moss)	0	0	1	0	0	1	0	X	X	X	2

Sheet D	1	2	3	4	5	6	7	8	9	10	Final
Newfoundland (Goss) 🔨	0	2	1	0	3	0	0	1	1	X	8
British Columbia (Armstrong)	3	0	0	1	0	0	2	0	0	X	6

=== Draw 11 ===
Sheet A	1	2	3	4	5	6	7	8	9	10	Final
Ontario (Howard) 🔨	2	0	2	0	0	1	0	0	1	X	6
Quebec (Butler)	0	1	0	1	0	0	1	1	0	X	4

Sheet B	1	2	3	4	5	6	7	8	9	10	Final
British Columbia (Armstrong) 🔨	0	0	0	2	0	0	1	0	2	0	5
Prince Edward Island (MacFadyen)	1	0	0	0	01	1	0	2	0	1	6

Sheet C	1	2	3	4	5	6	7	8	9	10	Final
New Brunswick (Kennedy) 🔨	1	0	0	3	0	1	0	0	3	X	8
Northern Ontario (Hackner)	0	1	1	0	1	0	2	1	0	X	6

Sheet D	1	2	3	4	5	6	7	8	9	10	Final
Nova Scotia (Jones) 🔨	1	0	0	1	0	0	0	1	0	X	3
Alberta (Martin)	0	1	1	0	2	1	0	0	1	X	6

=== Draw 12 ===
Sheet A	1	2	3	4	5	6	7	8	9	10	11	Final
Prince Edward Island (MacFadyen) 🔨	2	1	0	1	0	1	0	1	0	0	1	7
Newfoundland (Goss)	0	0	1	0	2	0	0	0	2	1	0	6

Sheet B	1	2	3	4	5	6	7	8	9	10	Final
Northern Ontario (Hackner) 🔨	1	0	2	0	0	0	1	0	1	1	6
Manitoba (Peters)	0	1	0	2	0	2	0	2	0	0	7

Sheet C	1	2	3	4	5	6	7	8	9	10	Final
Alberta (Martin) 🔨	0	0	0	2	0	1	0	2	0	1	6
Saskatchewan (Hebert)	0	0	1	0	2	0	1	0	1	0	5

Sheet D	1	2	3	4	5	6	7	8	9	10	Final
Yukon/Northwest Territories (Moss) 🔨	0	0	1	0	0	1	0	0	0	X	2
Ontario (Howard)	0	1	0	0	2	0	0	1	1	X	5

=== Draw 13 ===
Sheet A	1	2	3	4	5	6	7	8	9	10	Final
British Columbia (Armstrong) 🔨	0	1	0	0	1	2	0	1	0	0	5
Northern Ontario (Hackner)	1	0	1	0	0	0	1	0	2	2	7

Sheet B	1	2	3	4	5	6	7	8	9	10	Final
Nova Scotia (Jones) 🔨	0	0	0	0	0	0	2	0	X	X	2
Prince Edward Island (MacFadyen)	0	1	2	3	0	0	0	2	X	X	8

Sheet C	1	2	3	4	5	6	7	8	9	10	Final
Manitoba (Peters) 🔨	1	2	0	1	0	2	0	0	0	X	6
Ontario (Howard)	0	0	2	0	2	0	0	0	0	X	4

Sheet D	1	2	3	4	5	6	7	8	9	10	Final
New Brunswick (Kennedy) 🔨	1	0	0	0	0	2	0	1	0	0	4
Quebec (Butler)	0	0	2	0	0	0	2	0	0	2	6

=== Draw 14 ===
Sheet A	1	2	3	4	5	6	7	8	9	10	Final
Ontario (Howard) 🔨	1	2	1	0	0	1	0	0	0	X	5
Saskatchewan (Hebert)	0	0	0	1	0	0	0	0	1	X	2

Sheet B	1	2	3	4	5	6	7	8	9	10	Final
Alberta (Martin) 🔨	3	0	1	0	1	0	1	0	0	0	6
Newfoundland (Goss)	0	1	0	1	0	3	0	1	0	1	7

Sheet C	1	2	3	4	5	6	7	8	9	10	Final
Prince Edward Island (MacFadyen) 🔨	0	0	1	0	1	1	0	0	0	1	4
Manitoba (Peters)	0	0	0	2	0	0	1	0	0	0	3

Sheet D	1	2	3	4	5	6	7	8	9	10	Final
Northern Ontario (Hackner) 🔨	1	0	1	1	1	0	0	1	0	X	5
Yukon/Northwest Territories (Moss)	0	2	0	0		0	0	0	0	X	2

=== Draw 15 ===
Sheet A	1	2	3	4	5	6	7	8	9	10	Final
Quebec (Butler) 🔨	0	0	0	2	1	0	0	2	0	X	5
Nova Scotia (Jones)	0	0	0	0	0	1	1	0	0	X	2

Sheet B	1	2	3	4	5	6	7	8	9	10	Final
Saskatchewan (Hebert) 🔨	2	0	0	1	1	0	0	0	1	0	5
British Columbia (Armstrong)	0	3	1	0	0	1	0	1	0	1	7

Sheet C	1	2	3	4	5	6	7	8	9	10	11	Final
Yukon/Northwest Territories (Moss) 🔨	0	0	1	0	0	0	1	1	0	0	0	3
Alberta (Martin)	0	0	0	0	1	1	0	0	0	1	1	4

Sheet D	1	2	3	4	5	6	7	8	9	10	Final
Newfoundland (Goss) 🔨	20		2	0	2	0	1	2	0	X	9
New Brunswick (Kennedy)	0	2	0	1	0	1	0	0	1	X	5

=== Draw 16 ===
Sheet B	1	2	3	4	5	6	7	8	9	10	Final
Alberta (Martin) 🔨	0	1	0	0	0	0	2	1	0	X	4
Manitoba (Peters)	1	0	0	2	1	0	0	0	3	X	7

Sheet C	1	2	3	4	5	6	7	8	9	10	Final
Ontario (Howard) 🔨	3	3	0	0	1	0	0	1	0	X	8
Newfoundland (Goss)	0	0	1	0	0	1	1	0	1	X	4

=== Draw 17 ===
Sheet A	1	2	3	4	5	6	7	8	9	10	Final
Prince Edward Island (MacFadyen) 🔨	0	0	0	0	1	0	0	1	1	0	3
Yukon/Northwest Territories (Moss)	0	0	0	0	0	2	1	0	0	1	4

Sheet B	1	2	3	4	5	6	7	8	9	10	Final
New Brunswick (Kennedy) 🔨	1	0	0	0	0	2	0	0	1	X	4
Saskatchewan (Hebert)	0	0	1	1	0	0	2	2	0	X	6

Sheet C	1	2	3	4	5	6	7	8	9	10	Final
British Columbia (Armstrong) 🔨	1	2	0	1	1	0	2	0	1	X	8
Quebec (Butler)	0	0	2	0	0	2	0	1	0	X	5

Sheet D	1	2	3	4	5	6	7	8	9	10	Final
Nova Scotia (Jones) 🔨	0	1	0	0	0	0	0	X	X	X	1
Northern Ontario (Hackner)	1	0	2	0	3	0	2	X	X	X	8

== Playoffs ==
Semifinal			Final
			1	Manitoba	4
2	Ontario	7	2	Ontario	3
3	Alberta	4

=== Semifinal ===
Sheet B	1	2	3	4	5	6	7	8	9	10	Final
Ontario (Howard) 🔨	1	0	0	3	0	1	0	2	0	X	7
Alberta (Martin)	0	0	1	0	1	0	1	0	1	X	4

Player percentages
Ontario		Alberta	
Peter Corner	83%	Don Bartlett	99%
Wayne Middaugh	87%	Dan Petryk	85%
Glenn Howard	88%	Kevin Park	71%
Russ Howard	85%	Kevin Martin	75%
Total	86%	Total	82%

=== Final ===
March 15

Sheet B	1	2	3	4	5	6	7	8	9	10	11	Final
Manitoba (Peters) 🔨	1	0	0	0	1	0	1	0	0	0	1	4
Ontario (Howard)	0	2	0	0	0	0	0	0	1	0	0	3

Player percentages
Manitoba		Ontario	
Don Rudd	91%	Peter Corner	90%
Chris Neufeld	82%	Wayne Middaugh	84%
Dan Carey	74%	Glenn Howard	85%
Vic Peters	83%	Russ Howard	77%
Total	82%	Total	84%

== Statistics ==
=== Top 5 player percentages ===
Round Robin only

Leads	%
(Alberta) Don Bartlett	91
(Northern Ontario) Brian Adams	89
(Saskatchewan) Kerry Gudereit	85
(Ontario) Peter Corner	84
(British Columbia) Ed Fowler	82

Seconds	%
(Ontario) Wayne Middaugh	84
(Saskatchewan) Bob Novakowski	83
(Alberta) Dan Petryk	83
(Newfoundland and Labrador) John Allan	83
(Manitoba) Chris Neufeld	82

Thirds	%
(Ontario) Glenn Howard	84
(Manitoba) Dan Carey	82
(Alberta) Kevin Park	81
(Nova Scotia) Bruce Lohnes	80
(Quebec) Daniel Lemery	78

Skips	%
(Manitoba) Vic Peters	81
(Alberta) Kevin Martin	81
(Ontario) Russ Howard	81
(Saskatchewan) Brad Hebert	78
(British Columbia) Jim Armstrong	77

=== Team percentages ===
Round Robin only

Province	Skip	%
Alberta	Kevin Martin	84
Ontario	Russ Howard	83
Manitoba	Vic Peters	81
Saskatchewan	Brad Hebert	80
Quebec	Ted Butler	78
Northern Ontario	Al Hackner	77
British Columbia	Jim Armstrong	77
Nova Scotia	Dave Jones	77
Newfoundland	Glenn Goss	75
Northwest Territories/Yukon	Steve Moss	74
Prince Edward Island	Ted MacFadyen	74
New Brunswick	Mike Kennedy	71
