= 2013 Canadian Masters Curling Championships =

- Host city: Thunder Bay, Ontario
- Arena: Port Arthur Curling Club
- Dates: April 8–14
- Men's winner: Alberta
- Curling club: Calgary Curling Club, Calgary; Inglewood Curling Club, Calgary
- Skip: Harold Breckenridge
- Third: Don Hier
- Second: J. R. McDonald
- Lead: Gord Dewar
- Finalist: Ontario (Bob Turcotte)
- Women's winner: Ontario
- Curling club: Ottawa Curling Club, Ottawa; Rideau Curling Club, Ottawa
- Skip: Joyce Potter
- Third: Diana Favel
- Second: Janelle Sadler
- Lead: Jennifer Langley
- Finalist: Alberta (Linda Wagner)

The 2013 Canadian Masters Curling Championships were held from April 8 to 14 at the Port Arthur Curling Club in Thunder Bay, Ontario.

== Men ==
=== Teams ===
The teams are listed as follows:

Province	Skip	Third	Second	Lead	Locale
Alberta	Harold Breckenridge	Don Hier	J. R. McDonald	Gord Dewar	Calgary Curling Club, Calgary; Inglewood Curling Club, Calgary
British Columbia	Wayne Saboe	John Pisarczyk	Vince Hunter	John Cox	Kamloops Curling Club, Kamloops
Manitoba	Ralph Wilson	Jim Toduruk	Glen Rozak	Mick Bicklmeier	Dauphin Curling Club, Dauphin
New Brunswick	Rod Aube	Jake Healy	Bob Brannen	Gordie Tuttle	Capital Winter Club, Fredericton
Newfoundland and Labrador	Lew Andrews	Randy Pearcey	Michael Wotherspoon	Carl Laughlin	Bally Haly Golf & Curling Club, St. John's
Northern Ontario	Paul Carr	Glen Fossum	Ken Ketonen	Ed Koivula	Port Arthur Curling Club, Thunder Bay
Northwest Territories	Jack MacKinnon	Alan Hartman	Garry Tkachuk	Ben McDonald	Yellowknife Curling Club, Yellowknife
Nova Scotia	Alan Darragh	Reid Romkey	John Darragh	Glenn Josephson	Dartmouth Curling Club, Dartmouth
Ontario	Bob Turcotte	Roy Weigand	Bob Leclair	Brian Cooke	Scarboro Golf & Country Club, Toronto
Quebec	Lawren Steventon	Mike Carson	Malcolm Baines	Greg Sleno	Glenmore Curling Club, Dollard-des-Ormeaux
Saskatchewan	Eugene Hritzuk	Iggy Baranieski	Verne Anderson	Dave Folk	Nutana Curling Club, Saskatoon
Yukon	Dave Kalles	Pat Marcoff	Richard Trimble	Clarence Jack	Whitehorse Curling Club, Whitehorse

=== Round-robin standings ===
Final round-robin standings

Key
Teams to Playoffs

Pool A	Skip	W	L
Alberta	Harold Breckenridge	8	0
Ontario	Bob Turcotte	7	1
Saskatchewan	Eugene Hritzuk	6	2
Northwest Territories	Jack MacKinnon	4	4
Newfoundland and Labrador	Lew Andrews	2	6
New Brunswick	Rod Aube	2	6

Pool B	Skip	W	L
Nova Scotia	Alan Darragh	5	3
Manitoba	Ralph Wilson	5	3
Northern Ontario	Paul Carr	3	5
Quebec	Lawren Steventon	3	5
British Columbia	Wayne Saboe	2	6
Yukon	Dave Kalles	1	7

=== Round-robin results ===
All draw times are listed in Eastern Daylight Time (UTC−4).

==== Draw 2 ====
Monday, April 8, 20:30

Sheet A	1	2	3	4	5	6	7	8	Final
Nova Scotia (Darragh) 🔨	0	0	0	0	0	1	1	0	2
Saskatchewan (Hritzuk)	0	1	1	0	1	0	0	1	4

Sheet B	1	2	3	4	5	6	7	8	9	Final
Quebec (Steventon) 🔨	0	1	0	0	1	2	0	0	0	4
Alberta (Breckenridge)	1	0	0	2	0	0	0	1	1	5

Sheet C	1	2	3	4	5	6	7	8	Final
Northwest Territories (MacKinnon) 🔨	1	0	2	0	1	0	0	3	7
Northern Ontario (Carr)	0	1	0	1	0	0	4	0	6

Sheet D	1	2	3	4	5	6	7	8	Final
Yukon (Kalles) 🔨	0	1	1	1	0	1	0	0	4
New Brunswick (Aube)	2	0	0	0	1	0	1	2	6

Sheet E	1	2	3	4	5	6	7	8	Final
Manitoba (Wilson) 🔨	1	0	0	1	0	0	0	0	2
Ontario (Turcotte)	0	2	0	0	4	1	0	0	7

Sheet F	1	2	3	4	5	6	7	8	Final
British Columbia (Saboe) 🔨	1	1	0	2	1	0	0	X	5
Newfoundland and Labrador (Andrews)	0	0	1	0	0	0	2	X	3

==== Draw 4 ====
Tuesday, April 9, 12:00

Sheet A	1	2	3	4	5	6	7	8	Final
Alberta (Breckenridge)	2	0	0	0	2	0	1	X	5
Northern Ontario (Carr) 🔨	0	1	0	1	0	0	0	X	2

Sheet B	1	2	3	4	5	6	7	8	Final
New Brunswick (Aube)	0	2	0	0	0	1	0	X	3
Manitoba (Wilson) 🔨	3	0	2	1	3	0	3	X	12

Sheet C	1	2	3	4	5	6	7	8	Final
Saskatchewan (Hritzuk)	5	0	3	0	4	0	X	X	12
Yukon (Kalles) 🔨	0	1	0	1	0	1	X	X	3

Sheet D	1	2	3	4	5	6	7	8	Final
Northwest Territories (MacKinnon)	2	1	0	0	0	1	2	X	6
British Columbia (Saboe) 🔨	0	0	0	1	0	0	0	X	1

Sheet E	1	2	3	4	5	6	7	8	Final
Newfoundland and Labrador (Andrews) 🔨	0	0	2	0	0	0	0	X	2
Quebec (Steventon)	2	2	0	2	0	0	1	X	7

Sheet F	1	2	3	4	5	6	7	8	Final
Ontario (Turcotte)	2	0	2	1	0	2	1	X	8
Nova Scotia (Darragh) 🔨	0	2	0	0	1	0	0	X	3

==== Draw 6 ====
Tuesday, April 9, 19:00

Sheet A	1	2	3	4	5	6	7	8	9	Final
British Columbia (Saboe)	0	0	2	2	0	0	0	1	0	5
Quebec (Steventon) 🔨	0	0	0	0	0	3	2	0	1	6

Sheet B	1	2	3	4	5	6	7	8	Final
Yukon (Kalles) 🔨	1	0	1	0	1	0	1	1	5
Nova Scotia (Darragh)	0	2	0	2	0	3	0	0	7

Sheet C	1	2	3	4	5	6	7	8	9	Final
Ontario (Turcotte)	0	0	0	1	0	2	0	1	1	5
Northwest Territories (MacKinnon) 🔨	1	0	0	0	1	0	2	0	0	4

Sheet D	1	2	3	4	5	6	7	8	Final
Alberta (Breckenridge)	3	0	1	2	3	X	X	X	9
Newfoundland and Labrador (Andrews) 🔨	0	1	0	0	0	X	X	X	1

Sheet E	1	2	3	4	5	6	7	8	Final
Northern Ontario (Carr) 🔨	0	1	0	0	2	0	0	0	3
Manitoba (Wilson)	1	0	0	2	0	0	2	2	7

Sheet F	1	2	3	4	5	6	7	8	Final
Saskatchewan (Hritzuk)	0	3	0	1	0	1	0	2	7
New Brunswick (Aube) 🔨	1	0	1	0	2	0	1	0	5

==== Draw 8 ====
Wednesday, April 10, 12:00

Sheet A	1	2	3	4	5	6	7	8	Final
Manitoba (Wilson) 🔨	2	0	1	0	1	1	X	X	5
Yukon (Kalles)	0	1	0	1	0	0	X	X	2

Sheet B	1	2	3	4	5	6	7	8	9	Final
Northern Ontario (Carr) 🔨	0	2	0	1	0	3	0	0	1	7
Quebec (Steventon)	1	0	1	0	1	0	1	2	0	6

Sheet C	1	2	3	4	5	6	7	8	Final
Nova Scotia (Darragh)	2	0	1	0	0	2	0	3	8
British Columbia (Saboe) 🔨	0	2	0	3	0	0	2	0	7

Sheet D	1	2	3	4	5	6	7	8	Final
New Brunswick (Aube)	0	2	0	1	0	0	1	X	4
Ontario (Turcotte) 🔨	2	0	2	0	3	1	0	X	8

Sheet E	1	2	3	4	5	6	7	8	9	Final
Alberta (Breckenridge) 🔨	0	2	0	0	3	0	0	0	1	6
Saskatchewan (Hritzuk)	2	0	1	1	0	1	0	0	0	5

Sheet F	1	2	3	4	5	6	7	8	Final
Northwest Territories (MacKinnon)	1	3	0	0	2	1	1	X	8
Newfoundland and Labrador (Andrews) 🔨	0	0	2	1	0	0	0	X	3

==== Draw 10 ====
Thursday, April 11, 8:30

Sheet A	1	2	3	4	5	6	7	8	Final
Newfoundland and Labrador (Andrews)	0	1	1	0	1	0	1	1	5
Ontario (Turcotte) 🔨	2	0	0	0	0	4	0	0	6

Sheet B	1	2	3	4	5	6	7	8	9	Final
Saskatchewan (Hritzuk)	3	0	2	0	1	1	0	0	1	8
Northwest Territories (MacKinnon) 🔨	0	3	0	1	0	0	0	2	0	6

Sheet C	1	2	3	4	5	6	7	8	Final
New Brunswick (Aube)	0	0	0	0	1	1	1	X	3
Alberta (Breckenridge) 🔨	1	1	2	2	0	0	0	X	6

Sheet D	1	2	3	4	5	6	7	8	Final
Quebec (Steventon)	1	0	1	0	2	1	2	X	7
Yukon (Kalles) 🔨	0	1	0	2	0	0	0	X	3

Sheet E	1	2	3	4	5	6	7	8	Final
British Columbia (Saboe) 🔨	0	0	3	0	0	1	0	X	4
Northern Ontario (Carr)	0	1	0	3	0	0	2	X	6

Sheet F	1	2	3	4	5	6	7	8	Final
Nova Scotia (Darragh) 🔨	0	0	3	1	2	0	0	X	6
Manitoba (Wilson)	1	0	0	0	0	1	2	X	4

==== Draw 12 ====
Thursday, April 11, 15:30

Sheet A	1	2	3	4	5	6	7	8	9	Final
British Columbia (Saboe)	0	0	0	1	0	1	0	3	0	5
Alberta (Breckenridge) 🔨	0	0	1	0	2	0	2	0	1	6

Sheet B	1	2	3	4	5	6	7	8	Final
Ontario (Turcotte)	0	5	1	2	3	X	X	X	11
Yukon (Kalles) 🔨	2	0	0	0	0	X	X	X	2

Sheet C	1	2	3	4	5	6	7	8	Final
Northern Ontario (Carr)	1	0	2	0	1	0	1	0	5
Newfoundland and Labrador (Andrews) 🔨	0	2	0	2	0	1	0	2	7

Sheet D	1	2	3	4	5	6	7	8	9	Final
Saskatchewan (Hritzuk)	0	1	0	1	0	2	0	1	1	6
Manitoba (Wilson) 🔨	0	0	2	0	1	0	2	0	0	5

Sheet E	1	2	3	4	5	6	7	8	Final
Nova Scotia (Darragh)	3	0	2	0	1	0	0	0	6
New Brunswick (Aube) 🔨	0	1	0	1	0	1	1	1	5

Sheet F	1	2	3	4	5	6	7	8	Final
Quebec (Steventon) 🔨	0	1	0	1	0	0	X	X	2
Northwest Territories (MacKinnon)	1	0	1	0	2	3	X	X	7

==== Draw 14 ====
Friday, April 12, 8:30

Sheet A	1	2	3	4	5	6	7	8	Final
New Brunswick (Aube)	2	2	0	2	1	1	X	X	8
Northwest Territories (MacKinnon) 🔨	0	0	2	0	0	0	X	X	2

Sheet B	1	2	3	4	5	6	7	8	Final
Newfoundland and Labrador (Andrews) 🔨	0	0	1	0	1	1	0	X	3
Saskatchewan (Hritzuk)	3	2	0	3	0	0	3	X	11

Sheet C	1	2	3	4	5	6	7	8	Final
Manitoba (Wilson)	2	1	0	1	1	1	X	X	6
Quebec (Steventon) 🔨	0	0	0	0	0	0	X	X	0

Sheet D	1	2	3	4	5	6	7	8	Final
Northern Ontario (Carr)	0	2	0	3	0	2	1	X	8
Nova Scotia (Darragh) 🔨	1	0	1	0	2	0	0	X	4

Sheet E	1	2	3	4	5	6	7	8	Final
Yukon (Kalles) 🔨	2	0	0	2	0	0	1	0	5
British Columbia (Saboe)	0	3	0	0	2	0	0	1	6

Sheet F	1	2	3	4	5	6	7	8	Final
Alberta (Breckenridge) 🔨	0	0	1	1	0	2	0	1	5
Ontario (Turcotte)	1	1	0	0	1	0	1	0	4

==== Draw 16 ====
Friday, April 12, 15:30

Sheet A	1	2	3	4	5	6	7	8	Final
Quebec (Steventon)	0	0	1	1	0	3	0	0	5
Nova Scotia (Darragh) 🔨	0	2	0	0	2	0	1	1	6

Sheet B	1	2	3	4	5	6	7	8	Final
Manitoba (Wilson) 🔨	0	0	0	1	0	3	1	X	5
British Columbia (Saboe)	0	0	1	0	1	0	0	X	2

Sheet C	1	2	3	4	5	6	7	8	9	Final
Newfoundland and Labrador (Andrews) 🔨	1	1	0	0	1	2	0	0	1	6
New Brunswick (Aube)	0	0	3	0	0	0	0	2	0	5

Sheet D	1	2	3	4	5	6	7	8	Final
Ontario (Turcotte) 🔨	0	1	1	0	1	0	2	1	6
Saskatchewan (Hritzuk)	1	0	0	1	0	2	0	0	4

Sheet E	1	2	3	4	5	6	7	8	Final
Northwest Territories (MacKinnon)	0	0	1	0	2	X	X	X	3
Alberta (Breckenridge) 🔨	2	0	0	3	0	X	X	X	5

Sheet F	1	2	3	4	5	6	7	8	Final
Yukon (Kalles)	1	0	0	1	2	1	0	X	5
Northern Ontario (Carr) 🔨	0	1	1	0	0	0	2	X	4

=== Crossover Games ===
Saturday, April 13, 9:00

Sheet B	1	2	3	4	5	6	7	8	Final
Northwest Territories (MacKinnon) 🔨	0	1	0	0	0	0	X	X	1
Quebec (Steventon)	0	0	2	0	2	1	X	X	5

Sheet C	1	2	3	4	5	6	7	8	Final
Newfoundland and Labrador (Andrews) 🔨	0	0	0	0	0	X	X	X	0
British Columbia (Saboe)	2	1	3	2	1	X	X	X	9

Sheet D	1	2	3	4	5	6	7	8	Final
Saskatchewan (Hritzuk)	0	0	0	0	1	0	1	0	2
Northern Ontario (Carr) 🔨	1	0	0	1	0	1	0	1	4

Sheet E	1	2	3	4	5	6	7	8	Final
New Brunswick (Aube) 🔨	2	0	1	0	1	0	3	X	7
Yukon (Kalles)	0	2	0	1	0	1	0	X	4

=== Playoffs ===
Semifinals
A1	Alberta	9
B2	Manitoba	3
B1	Nova Scotia	3
A2	Ontario	8

Gold-medal game
A1	Alberta	7
A2	Ontario	4
Bronze-medal game
B2	Manitoba	9
B1	Nova Scotia	7

==== Semifinals ====
Saturday, April 13, 14:00

Sheet B	1	2	3	4	5	6	7	8	Final
Alberta (Breckenridge)	1	0	3	1	0	2	2	X	9
Manitoba (Wilson) 🔨	0	2	0	0	1	0	0	X	3

Sheet C	1	2	3	4	5	6	7	8	Final
Nova Scotia (Darragh) 🔨	0	0	1	0	2	0	X	X	3
Ontario (Turcotte)	1	2	0	1	0	4	X	X	8

==== Bronze-medal game ====
Sunday, April 14, 14:00

Sheet E	1	2	3	4	5	6	7	8	Final
Manitoba (Wilson) 🔨	2	0	1	0	3	0	1	2	9
Nova Scotia (Darragh)	0	1	0	4	0	2	0	0	7

==== Gold-medal game ====
Sunday, April 14, 14:00

Sheet D	1	2	3	4	5	6	7	8	Final
Alberta (Breckenridge)	2	0	2	0	1	0	2	X	7
Ontario (Turcotte) 🔨	0	1	0	1	0	2	0	X	4

== Women ==
=== Teams ===
The teams are listed as follows:

Province	Skip	Third	Second	Lead	Locale
Alberta	Linda Wagner	Sandra Turner	Judy Carr	Marilyn Toews	Calgary Curling Club, Calgary
British Columbia	Karen Lepine	Lorraine Jeffires	Carol Martel	Agnes Sigurdson	Langley Curling Club, Langley
Manitoba	Joyce McDougall	Linda van Daele	Karen Dunbar	Cheryl Orr	Brandon Curling Club, Brandon
New Brunswick	Susan Gilbert	Barbara Hallett	Ann Urquhart	Anita White	Capital Winter Club, Fredericton
Newfoundland and Labrador	Mary Byrne	Cheryl Stagg	Marchetta Gallant	Shirlet O'Connor	Caribou Curling Club, Stephenville
Northern Ontario	Marion Clark	Barbara Ward	Tannis Ferguson	Bev Junnila	Port Arthur Curling Club, Thunder Bay
Northern Ontario Host	Brenda Johnston	Jan Pula	Anne Harris	Jan Towns	Idylwylde Golf & Country Club, Sudbury
Nova Scotia	Judy Burgess	Helen Brightman	Jackie Connick	Penny Neily	Truro Curling Club, Truro
Ontario	Joyce Potter	Diana Favel	Janelle Sadler	Jennifer Langley	Ottawa Curling Club, Ottawa; Rideau Curling Club, Ottawa
Quebec	Rolande Madore	Michèle Pagé	Pauline Pagé	Denyse Robidoux	Club de curling Chicoutimi, Chicoutimi
Saskatchewan	Merle Kopach	Audrey Crossan	Linda Delver	Rae Wilson	Saskatoon-Granite Curling Club, Saskatoon
Yukon	Ellen Johnson	Elaine Summer	Ev Pasichnyk	Emma Donnessy	Whitehorse Curling Club, Whitehorse

=== Round-robin standings ===
Final round-robin standings

Key
Teams to Playoffs

Pool A	Skip	W	L
Alberta	Linda Wagner	6	2
Saskatchewan	Merle Kopach	6	2
Northern Ontario Host	Brenda Johnston	5	3
British Columbia	Karen Lepine	4	4
Manitoba	Joyce McDougall	4	4
New Brunswick	Susan Gilbert	0	8

Pool B	Skip	W	L
Ontario	Joyce Potter	7	1
Northern Ontario	Marion Clark	6	2
Quebec	Rolande Madore	5	3
Nova Scotia	Judy Burgess	3	5
Newfoundland and Labrador	Mary Byrne	1	7
Yukon	Ellen Johnson	1	7

=== Round-robin results ===
All draw times are listed in Eastern Daylight Time (UTC−4).

==== Draw 1 ====
Monday, April 8, 15:00

Sheet A	1	2	3	4	5	6	7	8	Final
Nova Scotia (Burgess) 🔨	0	3	0	0	0	1	0	X	4
Manitoba (McDougall)	3	0	2	0	0	0	2	X	7

Sheet B	1	2	3	4	5	6	7	8	Final
Ontario (Potter)	0	0	1	0	3	1	0	3	8
Alberta (Wagner)	0	3	0	2	0	0	2	0	7

Sheet C	1	2	3	4	5	6	7	8	Final
British Columbia (Lepine)	1	0	1	1	0	0	1	0	4
Quebec (Madore)	0	3	0	0	1	1	0	1	6

Sheet D	1	2	3	4	5	6	7	8	Final
Newfoundland and Labrador (Byrne)	0	0	0	1	1	0	0	X	2
Northern Ontario Host (Johnston)	2	1	1	0	0	1	1	X	6

Sheet E	1	2	3	4	5	6	7	8	Final
Northern Ontario (Clark)	1	0	5	1	0	0	5	X	12
New Brunswick (Gilbert) 🔨	0	1	0	0	1	2	0	X	4

Sheet F	1	2	3	4	5	6	7	8	Final
Yukon (Johnson) 🔨	1	1	4	0	2	0	0	0	8
Saskatchewan (Kopach)	0	0	0	4	0	4	1	2	11

==== Draw 3 ====
Tuesday, April 9, 8:30

Sheet A	1	2	3	4	5	6	7	8	Final
Alberta (Wagner) 🔨	0	0	1	0	3	0	0	1	5
Quebec (Madore)	1	1	0	1	0	1	0	0	4

Sheet B	1	2	3	4	5	6	7	8	Final
Northern Ontario Host (Johnston)	1	0	4	2	1	X	X	X	8
Northern Ontario (Clark) 🔨	0	1	0	0	0	X	X	X	1

Sheet C	1	2	3	4	5	6	7	8	Final
Manitoba (McDougall) 🔨	2	0	0	3	0	2	0	X	7
Newfoundland and Labrador (Byrne)	0	0	2	0	1	0	1	X	4

Sheet D	1	2	3	4	5	6	7	8	Final
British Columbia (Lepine)	2	0	1	0	4	2	X	X	9
Yukon (Johnson) 🔨	0	1	0	1	0	0	X	X	2

Sheet E	1	2	3	4	5	6	7	8	Final
Saskatchewan (Kopach)	1	0	0	2	0	0	X	X	3
Ontario (Potter) 🔨	0	2	2	0	2	3	X	X	9

Sheet F	1	2	3	4	5	6	7	8	Final
New Brunswick (Gilbert)	0	0	0	1	1	0	1	0	3
Nova Scotia (Burgess) 🔨	1	2	1	0	0	1	0	1	6

==== Draw 5 ====
Tuesday, April 9, 15:30

Sheet A	1	2	3	4	5	6	7	8	Final
Yukon (Johnson)	0	0	0	1	0	0	X	X	1
Ontario (Potter) 🔨	3	3	6	0	1	1	X	X	14

Sheet B	1	2	3	4	5	6	7	8	Final
Newfoundland and Labrador (Byrne) 🔨	0	1	0	0	0	X	X	X	1
Nova Scotia (Burgess)	1	0	3	2	1	X	X	X	7

Sheet C	1	2	3	4	5	6	7	8	Final
New Brunswick (Gilbert) 🔨	1	0	0	0	0	X	X	X	1
British Columbia (Lepine)	0	2	3	1	4	X	X	X	10

Sheet D	1	2	3	4	5	6	7	8	Final
Alberta (Wagner) 🔨	1	0	0	0	2	1	2	X	6
Saskatchewan (Kopach)	0	0	1	0	0	0	0	X	1

Sheet E	1	2	3	4	5	6	7	8	Final
Quebec (Madore)	0	1	0	1	0	1	1	1	5
Northern Ontario (Clark) 🔨	1	0	3	0	2	0	0	0	6

Sheet F	1	2	3	4	5	6	7	8	Final
Manitoba (McDougall)	0	0	1	0	0	2	1	0	4
Northern Ontario Host (Johnston) 🔨	1	1	0	1	1	0	0	1	5

==== Draw 7 ====
Wednesday, April 10, 8:30

Sheet A	1	2	3	4	5	6	7	8	Final
Northern Ontario (Clark)	0	2	1	0	0	4	3	X	10
Newfoundland and Labrador (Byrne) 🔨	0	0	0	0	1	0	0	X	1

Sheet B	1	2	3	4	5	6	7	8	9	Final
Quebec (Madore)	0	0	0	1	1	0	2	1	1	6
Ontario (Potter) 🔨	2	0	1	0	0	2	0	0	0	5

Sheet C	1	2	3	4	5	6	7	8	Final
Nova Scotia (Burgess) 🔨	3	0	2	0	1	2	0	X	8
Yukon (Johnson)	0	1	0	1	0	0	1	X	3

Sheet D	1	2	3	4	5	6	7	8	Final
Northern Ontario Host (Johnston)	2	2	0	2	5	X	X	X	11
New Brunswick (Gilbert) 🔨	0	0	1	0	0	X	X	X	1

Sheet E	1	2	3	4	5	6	7	8	Final
Alberta (Wagner)	0	0	2	0	0	0	2	0	4
Manitoba (McDougall) 🔨	0	1	0	1	2	3	0	0	7

Sheet F	1	2	3	4	5	6	7	8	Final
British Columbia (Lepine) 🔨	2	0	0	0	0	X	X	X	2
Saskatchewan (Kopach)	0	2	3	3	2	X	X	X	10

==== Draw 9 ====
Wednesday, April 10, 15:30

Sheet A	1	2	3	4	5	6	7	8	Final
Saskatchewan (Kopach)	2	1	1	0	3	0	1	X	8
New Brunswick (Gilbert) 🔨	0	0	0	3	0	1	0	X	4

Sheet B	1	2	3	4	5	6	7	8	Final
Manitoba (McDougall) 🔨	0	1	0	2	0	1	0	0	4
British Columbia (Lepine)	0	0	1	0	1	0	1	2	5

Sheet C	1	2	3	4	5	6	7	8	Final
Northern Ontario Host (Johnston) 🔨	3	0	1	0	1	0	2	0	7
Alberta (Wagner)	0	2	0	1	0	3	0	2	8

Sheet D	1	2	3	4	5	6	7	8	Final
Ontario (Potter)	1	0	2	2	1	2	X	X	8
Newfoundland and Labrador (Byrne) 🔨	0	1	0	0	0	0	X	X	1

Sheet E	1	2	3	4	5	6	7	8	Final
Yukon (Johnson)	0	0	1	0	0	0	X	X	1
Quebec (Madore) 🔨	2	2	0	3	4	1	X	X	12

Sheet F	1	2	3	4	5	6	7	8	Final
Nova Scotia (Burgess) 🔨	0	0	2	0	0	0	X	X	2
Northern Ontario (Clark)	0	4	0	3	1	3	X	X	11

==== Draw 11 ====
Thursday, April 11, 12:00

Sheet A	1	2	3	4	5	6	7	8	Final
Yukon (Johnson)	0	0	2	0	1	0	X	X	3
Alberta (Wagner) 🔨	3	3	0	3	0	3	X	X	12

Sheet B	1	2	3	4	5	6	7	8	Final
New Brunswick (Gilbert)	0	0	0	0	1	0	X	X	1
Newfoundland and Labrador (Byrne) 🔨	1	2	2	1	0	1	X	X	7

Sheet C	1	2	3	4	5	6	7	8	Final
Quebec (Madore)	0	1	0	1	0	2	1	0	5
Saskatchewan (Kopach) 🔨	1	0	2	0	3	0	0	1	7

Sheet D	1	2	3	4	5	6	7	8	9	Final
Manitoba (McDougall) 🔨	3	0	0	1	0	2	0	0	0	6
Northern Ontario (Clark)	0	1	1	0	1	0	2	1	2	8

Sheet E	1	2	3	4	5	6	7	8	9	Final
Nova Scotia (Burgess)	0	1	0	0	2	1	0	2	0	6
Northern Ontario Host (Johnston) 🔨	1	0	3	1	0	0	2	0	2	9

Sheet F	1	2	3	4	5	6	7	8	Final
Ontario (Potter)	1	1	1	0	2	0	1	X	6
British Columbia (Lepine) 🔨	0	0	0	1	0	2	0	X	3

==== Draw 13 ====
Thursday, April 11, 19:00

Sheet A	1	2	3	4	5	6	7	8	Final
Northern Ontario Host (Johnston) 🔨	0	3	0	0	0	0	2	X	5
British Columbia (Lepine)	2	0	1	1	4	1	0	X	9

Sheet B	1	2	3	4	5	6	7	8	Final
Saskatchewan (Kopach)	2	0	2	2	2	0	2	X	10
Manitoba (McDougall) 🔨	0	1	0	0	0	2	0	X	3

Sheet C	1	2	3	4	5	6	7	8	Final
Northern Ontario (Clark) 🔨	0	0	4	0	2	0	X	X	6
Ontario (Potter)	4	1	0	5	0	2	X	X	12

Sheet D	1	2	3	4	5	6	7	8	Final
Quebec (Madore)	0	2	0	1	0	1	2	2	8
Nova Scotia (Burgess) 🔨	1	0	2	0	1	0	0	0	4

Sheet E	1	2	3	4	5	6	7	8	Final
Newfoundland and Labrador (Byrne)	1	0	3	0	0	0	0	X	4
Yukon (Johnson) 🔨	0	1	0	1	3	1	1	X	7

Sheet F	1	2	3	4	5	6	7	8	Final
Alberta (Wagner)	5	0	4	0	0	1	0	X	10
New Brunswick (Gilbert) 🔨	0	2	0	1	1	0	1	X	5

==== Draw 15 ====
Friday, April 12, 12:00

Sheet A	1	2	3	4	5	6	7	8	Final
Ontario (Potter)	3	0	3	0	0	1	0	1	8
Nova Scotia (Burgess) 🔨	0	1	0	1	4	0	0	0	6

Sheet B	1	2	3	4	5	6	7	8	Final
Northern Ontario (Clark) 🔨	3	5	0	2	0	0	X	X	10
Yukon (Johnson)	0	0	1	0	1	2	X	X	4

Sheet C	1	2	3	4	5	6	7	8	Final
Saskatchewan (Kopach)	2	0	0	2	0	1	0	X	5
Northern Ontario Host (Johnston) 🔨	0	0	1	0	1	0	1	X	3

Sheet D	1	2	3	4	5	6	7	8	Final
New Brunswick (Gilbert) 🔨	0	0	1	0	0	0	X	X	1
Manitoba (McDougall)	2	1	0	1	1	2	X	X	7

Sheet E	1	2	3	4	5	6	7	8	Final
British Columbia (Lepine) 🔨	0	0	0	0	0	X	X	X	0
Alberta (Wagner)	1	2	1	2	1	X	X	X	7

Sheet F	1	2	3	4	5	6	7	8	Final
Newfoundland and Labrador (Byrne) 🔨	0	0	1	2	0	0	0	X	3
Quebec (Madore)	1	1	0	0	1	2	3	X	8

=== Crossover Games ===
Friday, April 12, 19:30

Team	1	2	3	4	5	6	7	8	Final
Northern Ontario Host (Johnston)	0	2	0	1	0	1	0	0	4
Quebec (Madore) 🔨	1	0	1	0	1	0	3	1	7

Team	1	2	3	4	5	6	7	8	Final
British Columbia (Lepine) 🔨	0	2	0	1	0	0	0	1	4
Nova Scotia (Burgess)	0	0	1	0	1	0	0	0	2

Team	1	2	3	4	5	6	7	8	Final
New Brunswick (Gilbert) 🔨	0	0	0	0	X	X	X	X	0
Newfoundland and Labrador (Byrne)	2	1	2	3	X	X	X	X	8

Team	1	2	3	4	5	6	7	8	Final
Manitoba (McDougall) 🔨	3	0	4	1	X	X	X	X	8
Yukon (Johnson)	0	1	0	0	X	X	X	X	1

=== Playoffs ===
Semifinals
A1	Alberta	6
B2	Northern Ontario	2
B1	Ontario	7
A2	Saskatchewan	6

Gold-medal game
A1	Alberta	3
B1	Ontario	8
Bronze-medal game
B2	Northern Ontario	4
A2	Saskatchewan	7

==== Semifinals ====
Saturday, April 13, 14:00

Sheet D	1	2	3	4	5	6	7	8	Final
Alberta (Wagner) 🔨	0	0	0	3	1	0	1	1	6
Northern Ontario (Clark)	1	0	0	0	0	1	0	0	2

Sheet E	1	2	3	4	5	6	7	8	9	Final
Ontario (Potter)	2	0	1	0	1	0	2	0	1	7
Saskatchewan (Kopach) 🔨	0	1	0	2	0	1	0	2	0	6

==== Bronze-medal game ====
Sunday, April 14, 14:00

Sheet B	1	2	3	4	5	6	7	8	Final
Northern Ontario (Clark)	0	0	1	0	0	2	1	X	4
Saskatchewan (Kopach) 🔨	1	1	0	4	1	0	0	X	7

==== Gold-medal game ====
Sunday, April 14, 14:00

Sheet C	1	2	3	4	5	6	7	8	Final
Alberta (Wagner) 🔨	0	0	1	1	0	1	0	X	3
Ontario (Potter)	2	3	0	0	1	0	2	X	8
