= 1976 Air Canada Silver Broom =

- Host city: Duluth, Minnesota, United States
- Arena: Memorial Auditorium
- Dates: March 22–28, 1976
- Winner: United States
- Curling club: Hibbing CC, Minnesota
- Skip: Bruce Roberts
- Third: Joe Roberts
- Second: Gary Kleffman
- Lead: Jerry Scott
- Finalist: Scotland

The 1976 Air Canada Silver Broom was held at the Memorial Auditorium in Duluth, Minnesota, United States from March 22–28, 1976.

== Teams ==
Canada	Denmark	France	Germany	Italy
St. John's CC, St. John's, Newfoundland Skip: Jack MacDuff; Third: Toby McDonald; Second: Doug Hudson; Lead: Ken Templeton	Hvidovre CC, Hvidovre Skip: Ole Larsen; Third: Jørn Blach; Second: Freddy Bartelsen; Lead: Jørn Jørgensen	Mont d' Arbois CC, Megève Skip: André Tronc; Third: Gerard Pasquier; Second: Richard Duvillard; Lead: Henri Woehrling	EC Bad Tölz, Bad Tölz Skip: Klaus Kanz; Third: Manfred Rösgen; Second: Manfred Schulze; Lead: Adalbert Mayer	Cortina CC, Cortina d' Ampezzo Skip: Giuseppe Dal Molin; Third: Andrea Pavani; Second: Enea Pavani; Lead: Leone Rezzadore
Norway	Scotland	Sweden	Switzerland	United States
Trondheim CC, Trondheim Skip: Kristian Sørum; Third: Eigil Ramsfjell; Second: Gunnar Meland; Lead: Gunnar Sigstadsø	St. Martin's CC, Perth Skip: Bill Muirhead; Third: Derek Scott; Second: Len Dudman; Lead: Roy Sinclair	Oden CK, Östersund Fourth: Kjell Edfalk; Third: Roger Svanberg; Skip: Bengt Cederwall*; Lead: Mats Olofsson	Olten CC, Olten Skip: Adolf Aerni; Third: Martin Sägesser; Second: Martin Plüss; Lead: Robert Stettler	Hibbing CC, Minnesota Skip: Bruce Roberts; Third: Joe Roberts; Second: Gary Kleffman; Lead: Jerry Scott

*Throws second rocks.

== Round-robin standings ==
Key
Teams to playoffs
Teams to tiebreaker

Country	Skip	W	L
United States	Bruce Roberts	8	1
Switzerland	Adolf Aerni	7	2
Scotland	Bill Muirhead	6	3
Italy	Giuseppe Dal Molin	5	4
Sweden	Bengt Cederwall	5	4
Norway	Kristian Sørum	4	5
France	André Tronc	4	5
Germany	Klaus Kanz	3	6
Canada	Jack MacDuff	2	7
Denmark	Ole Larsen	1	8

== Round-robin results ==
=== Draw 1 ===
Team	1	2	3	4	5	6	7	8	9	10	Final
Sweden (Cederwall)	0	2	1	0	0	0	4	0	2	X	9
Germany (Kanz)	0	0	0	1	1	0	0	1	0	X	3

Team	1	2	3	4	5	6	7	8	9	10	Final
Norway (Sørum)	1	0	0	0	0	1	0	0	1	X	3
Canada (MacDuff)	0	2	0	0	1	0	0	2	0	X	5

Team	1	2	3	4	5	6	7	8	9	10	Final
United States (Roberts)	2	0	0	6	0	4	1	0	2	X	15
France (Tronc)	0	1	0	0	1	0	0	1	0	X	3

Team	1	2	3	4	5	6	7	8	9	10	Final
Italy (Dal Molin)	0	1	0	0	0	0	0	0	1	X	2
Switzerland (Aerni)	1	0	3	2	0	1	1	0	0	X	8

Team	1	2	3	4	5	6	7	8	9	10	Final
Scotland (Muirhead)	2	0	1	0	1	0	3	0	0	X	7
Denmark (Larsen)	0	2	0	2	0	1	0	0	0	X	5

=== Draw 2 ===
Team	1	2	3	4	5	6	7	8	9	10	Final
Switzerland (Aerni)	2	2	0	2	0	0	1	0	0	2	9
Denmark (Larsen)	0	0	3	0	1	1	0	2	1	0	8

Team	1	2	3	4	5	6	7	8	9	10	Final
France (Tronc)	0	1	0	0	0	0	0	0	0	0	1
Italy (Dal Molin)	2	0	0	1	0	1	1	0	1	1	7

Team	1	2	3	4	5	6	7	8	9	10	Final
Sweden (Cederwall)	0	1	0	0	0	3	0	0	1	0	5
Norway (Sørum)	0	0	2	0	1	0	1	2	0	0	6

Team	1	2	3	4	5	6	7	8	9	10	Final
United States (Roberts)	0	0	6	0	1	0	1	0	2	X	10
Scotland (Muirhead)	1	1	0	0	0	1	0	1	0	X	4

Team	1	2	3	4	5	6	7	8	9	10	Final
Germany (Kanz)	1	0	1	0	0	1	1	0	0	X	4
Canada (MacDuff)	0	2	0	2	2	0	0	1	1	X	8

=== Draw 3 ===
Team	1	2	3	4	5	6	7	8	9	10	11	Final
Norway (Sørum)	1	0	0	1	0	1	0	0	1	0	1	5
Italy (Dal Molin)	0	1	1	0	1	0	0	0	0	1	0	4

Team	1	2	3	4	5	6	7	8	9	10	Final
Sweden (Cederwall)	1	2	2	0	3	0	1	1	X	X	10
Denmark (Larsen)	0	0	0	0	0	1	0	0	X	X	1

Team	1	2	3	4	5	6	7	8	9	10	Final
Germany (Kanz)	0	0	1	1	1	1	2	0	3	X	9
Scotland (Muirhead)	0	1	0	0	0	0	0	1	0	X	2

Team	1	2	3	4	5	6	7	8	9	10	Final
Canada (MacDuff)	3	0	0	1	0	1	0	0	0	X	5
France (Tronc)	0	2	0	0	2	0	2	2	2	X	10

Team	1	2	3	4	5	6	7	8	9	10	Final
United States (Roberts)	2	0	0	3	1	2	2	0	0	X	10
Switzerland (Aerni)	0	2	1	0	0	0	0	1	1	X	5

=== Draw 4 ===
Team	1	2	3	4	5	6	7	8	9	10	Final
Sweden (Cederwall)	1	0	3	0	0	1	2	1	0	X	8
Canada (MacDuff)	0	2	0	1	1	0	0	0	1	X	5

Team	1	2	3	4	5	6	7	8	9	10	Final
Norway (Sørum)	0	0	0	0	1	0	1	0	X	X	2
United States (Roberts)	0	1	1	1	0	3	0	4	X	X	10

Team	1	2	3	4	5	6	7	8	9	10	Final
France (Tronc)	1	0	2	0	1	0	1	3	1	X	9
Denmark (Larsen)	0	1	0	2	0	1	0	0	0	X	4

Team	1	2	3	4	5	6	7	8	9	10	Final
Germany (Kanz)	0	0	0	1	1	0	0	0	0	X	2
Switzerland (Aerni)	0	1	1	0	0	0	1	1	0	X	4

Team	1	2	3	4	5	6	7	8	9	10	11	Final
Italy (Dal Molin)	1	0	0	1	0	0	1	0	0	1	0	4
Scotland (Muirhead)	0	1	0	0	1	1	0	1	0	0	1	5

=== Draw 5 ===
Team	1	2	3	4	5	6	7	8	9	10	Final
Germany (Kanz)	0	1	0	1	0	0	0	0	0	X	2
France (Tronc)	2	0	1	0	1	1	2	2	3	X	12

Team	1	2	3	4	5	6	7	8	9	10	Final
Canada (MacDuff)	0	0	0	1	0	0	1	2	0	X	4
Italy (Dal Molin)	1	2	1	0	2	1	0	0	0	X	7

Team	1	2	3	4	5	6	7	8	9	10	Final
Norway (Sørum)	1	0	0	0	1	0	0	0	3	X	5
Switzerland (Aerni)	0	0	4	2	0	1	0	3	0	X	10

Team	1	2	3	4	5	6	7	8	9	10	Final
Sweden (Cederwall)	0	1	0	1	0	1	0	0	2	X	5
Scotland (Muirhead)	1	0	1	0	3	0	1	1	0	X	7

Team	1	2	3	4	5	6	7	8	9	10	Final
United States (Roberts)	2	2	2	1	1	0	2	0	2	X	12
Denmark (Larsen)	0	0	0	0	0	1	0	2	0	X	3

=== Draw 6 ===
Team	1	2	3	4	5	6	7	8	9	10	Final
Canada (MacDuff)	0	1	0	2	0	1	1	0	0	X	5
United States (Roberts)	1	0	2	0	1	0	0	4	2	X	10

Team	1	2	3	4	5	6	7	8	9	10	Final
Switzerland (Aerni)	1	0	1	0	0	0	1	0	2	0	5
Scotland (Muirhead)	0	0	0	1	0	0	0	2	0	1	4

Team	1	2	3	4	5	6	7	8	9	10	Final
Germany (Kanz)	0	1	0	0	0	1	0	0	0	X	2
Italy (Dal Molin)	1	0	0	0	1	0	0	1	2	X	5

Team	1	2	3	4	5	6	7	8	9	10	Final
Norway (Sørum)	0	0	1	1	0	0	0	1	3	3	9
Denmark (Larsen)	2	0	0	0	2	0	2	0	0	0	6

Team	1	2	3	4	5	6	7	8	9	10	11	Final
Sweden (Cederwall)	2	0	0	0	0	2	0	3	0	0	0	7
France (Tronc)	0	2	1	0	1	0	2	0	0	1	1	8

=== Draw 7 ===
Team	1	2	3	4	5	6	7	8	9	10	Final
France (Tronc)	0	0	1	0	0	0	2	0	0	X	3
Scotland (Muirhead)	1	1	0	1	2	0	0	0	0	X	5

Team	1	2	3	4	5	6	7	8	9	10	Final
Italy (Dal Molin)	3	0	2	0	3	0	1	0	1	X	10
Denmark (Larsen)	0	0	0	1	0	1	0	1	0	X	3

Team	1	2	3	4	5	6	7	8	9	10	Final
Sweden (Cederwall)	1	1	2	0	3	0	1	0	1	X	9
United States (Roberts)	0	0	0	1	0	1	0	1	0	X	3

Team	1	2	3	4	5	6	7	8	9	10	Final
Canada (MacDuff)	0	0	0	1	0	0	0	1	0	X	2
Switzerland (Aerni)	0	2	1	0	0	0	3	0	1	X	7

Team	1	2	3	4	5	6	7	8	9	10	Final
Germany (Kanz)	1	1	1	0	1	0	0	1	0	X	5
Norway (Sørum)	0	0	0	1	0	0	2	0	0	X	3

=== Draw 8 ===
Team	1	2	3	4	5	6	7	8	9	10	Final
United States (Roberts)	0	0	3	0	0	2	1	1	1	X	8
Italy (Dal Molin)	0	1	0	1	1	0	0	0	0	X	3

Team	1	2	3	4	5	6	7	8	9	10	Final
Norway (Sørum)	0	0	0	0	0	2	2	0	0	1	5
France (Tronc)	0	1	1	0	0	0	0	1	1	0	4

Team	1	2	3	4	5	6	7	8	9	10	Final
Canada (MacDuff)	0	0	0	1	0	0	1	0	0	X	2
Scotland (Muirhead)	0	0	2	0	1	1	0	0	2	X	6

Team	1	2	3	4	5	6	7	8	9	10	Final
Germany (Kanz)	2	0	1	1	0	1	1	0	2	X	8
Denmark (Larsen)	0	1	0	0	1	0	0	3	0	X	5

Team	1	2	3	4	5	6	7	8	9	10	Final
Sweden (Cederwall)	0	1	1	0	0	0	0	1	0	3	6
Switzerland (Aerni)	1	0	0	0	0	0	1	0	1	0	3

=== Draw 9 ===
Team	1	2	3	4	5	6	7	8	9	10	Final
Norway (Sørum)	0	0	1	0	0	0	1	0	2	0	4
Scotland (Muirhead)	1	1	0	0	1	0	0	1	0	2	6

Team	1	2	3	4	5	6	7	8	9	10	Final
Germany (Kanz)	1	0	0	1	0	0	1	0	0	X	3
United States (Roberts)	0	1	1	0	3	0	0	4	2	X	11

Team	1	2	3	4	5	6	7	8	9	10	Final
France (Tronc)	0	3	0	1	0	0	2	0	1	0	7
Switzerland (Aerni)	3	0	1	0	0	2	0	1	0	2	9

Team	1	2	3	4	5	6	7	8	9	10	Final
Sweden (Cederwall)	1	1	0	0	0	2	0	1	1	0	6
Italy (Dal Molin)	0	0	0	3	4	0	2	0	0	1	9

Team	1	2	3	4	5	6	7	8	9	10	Final
Canada (MacDuff)	0	0	4	0	2	0	1	0	0	1	8
Denmark (Larsen)	3	3	0	1	0	1	0	1	1	0	10

=== Tie-breaker ===
Sheet C	1	2	3	4	5	6	7	8	9	10	Final
Sweden (Cederwall)	2	2	0	2	0	1	0	0	1	X	8
Italy (Dal Molin)	0	0	1	0	2	0	0	1	0	X	4

== Playoffs ==
Semi-final
1	United States	9
4	Sweden	3
2	Scotland	5
3	Switzerland	3

Final
1	United States	6
2	Scotland	5

=== Semifinals ===
Sheet B	1	2	3	4	5	6	7	8	9	10	Final
Sweden (Cederwall)	0	0	0	0	0	2	0	0	1	X	3
United States (Roberts)	1	0	1	1	1	0	2	3	0	X	9

Sheet D	1	2	3	4	5	6	7	8	9	10	Final
Switzerland (Aerni)	0	0	1	1	0	0	0	1	0	0	3
Scotland (Muirhead)	1	0	0	0	1	1	1	0	0	1	5

=== Final ===
Sheet C	1	2	3	4	5	6	7	8	9	10	Final
United States (Roberts)	0	2	0	2	0	0	1	0	0	1	6
Scotland (Muirhead)	0	0	1	0	1	2	0	1	0	0	5

1976 Air Canada Silver Broom
(United States)
United States
3rd title
