= Jack MacDuff =

Canadian curler and air traffic controller

John Alexander "Chico" MacDuff (born February 16, 1950) is an air traffic controller and curler. He skipped Newfoundland to its first ever Brier championship in 1976.

== Curling ==
Born in Halifax, Nova Scotia, the son of Jim and Eileen MacDuff, MacDuff was the skip of the 1976 men's curling team representing the province of Newfoundland that won the 1976 Canadian Men's curling championship. It was the first time the province had won the Canadian Men's curling championship. Members of the team were, Jack MacDuff, Toby McDonald, Doug Hudson and Ken Templeton. The team represented Canada at the 1976 Air Canada Silver Broom World Championship, finishing in 9th place with a 2–7 record. As of 2022, it is Canada's worst ever finish at the World Men's Curling Championship.

MacDuff had previously played in the 1972 Macdonald Brier as the third for Team Newfoundland, which was skipped by Fred Durant. The entire team were students at Memorial University of Newfoundland at the time. At the 1972 Brier, the team finished 3–7.

MacDuff currently lives in Moncton, New Brunswick. He is unable to curl due to having multiple sclerosis.
