= Bengt Cederwall =

Swedish curler (born 1929)

- Curler ♂
- Born: 15 January 1929

Team
- Curling club: CK Oden, Östersund

Curling career
- Member Association: Sweden
- World Championship: 1 (1976)
Medal record
Curling
Swedish Men's Championship
Silver medal – second place	1976

Bengt Cederwall (born 15 January 1929) is a Swedish curler.

Cederwall's team competed for Sweden in the 1976 World Men's championship, because it was decided that the 1976 Swedish championship team from IF GÖTA (skip Jens Håkansson) was too young for the World Championship and so they went to the Worlds instead.

From 1973 to 1987 he was a board member of the Swedish Curling Association (Swedish: Svenska Curlingförbundet).

== Teams ==
Season	Skip	Third	Second	Lead	Events
1975–76	Kjell Edfalk (fourth)	Roger Svanberg	Bengt Cederwall (skip)	Mats Olofsson	SMCC 1976 (silver); WCC 1976 (4th)
1981–82	Bengt Cederwall	Ivan Bill	P-O Jonsson	Bernt Bergman	SSCC 1982 (gold)

== Personal life ==
His son is Swedish curler Peter Cederwall, who played for Sweden at the 1989 World men's championship.
