= Doug Hudson (curler) =

Canadian male curler

- Curler ♂

Team
- Curling club: St. John's CC, St. John's, NL

Curling career
- Member Association: Newfoundland and Labrador
- Brier: 2 (1974, 1976)
- World Championship: 1 (1976)
Medal record
Curling
Macdonald Brier
Representing Newfoundland
Gold medal – first place	1976 Regina

Douglas J. Hudson (born c. 1943) is a Canadian curler.

At the national level, he won the 1976 Macdonald Brier, as a member of the first-ever team from Newfoundland and Labrador to win the Brier.

== Personal life ==
As of 1992, Hudson was employed as an accountant for a St. John's ferry company. At the time of the 1976 Brier, he was employed as an employee relations service clerk.

== Teams ==
Season	Skip	Third	Second	Lead	Events
1973–74	Fred Wight	Damien Ryan	Doug Hudson	Keith Wight	Brier 1974 (11th)
1975–76	Jack MacDuff	Toby McDonald	Doug Hudson	Ken Templeton	Brier 1976 (gold); WCC 1976 (9th)
1996–97	Damien Ryan	Roger Mabey	Lew Andrews	Doug Hudson	CSCC 1997 (bronze)
