= Ken Templeton =

Canadian male curler

- Curler ♂

Team
- Curling club: St. John's CC, St. John's, NL

Curling career
- Member Association: Newfoundland
- Brier: 1 (1976)
- World Championship: 1 (1976)
Medal record
Curling
Macdonald Brier
Representing Newfoundland
Gold medal – first place	1976 Regina

Kenneth A. Templeton (born c. 1951) is a Canadian curler.

At the national level, he won the 1976 Macdonald Brier, as a member of the first ever team from Newfoundland and Labrador to win the Brier.

== Personal life ==
As of 1992, Templeton was employed as a lawyer in St. John's. At the time of the 1976 Brier, he was employed as a chartered accountant.

== Teams ==
Season	Skip	Third	Second	Lead	Events
1965–66	Dan Herder	Andrew Baird	Ken Templeton	Robert Hopkins	CJCC 1966 (T8th)
1975–76	Jack MacDuff	Toby McDonald	Doug Hudson	Ken Templeton	Brier 1976 (gold); WCC 1976 (9th)
