= Mats Olofsson =

Swedish male curler

- Curler ♂
- Born: 25 September 1945 (age 81)

Team
- Curling club: CK Oden, Östersund

Curling career
- Member Association: Sweden
- World Championship: 1 (1976)
Medal record
Curling
Swedish Men's Championship
Silver medal – second place	1976

Mats Göran Olofsson (born 25 September 1945) is a Swedish curler.

His team competed for Sweden in the 1976 World Men's championship, because it was decided that the 1976 Swedish championship team from IF GÖTA (skip Jens Håkansson) was too young for the World Championship and so they went to the Worlds instead.

From 1991 to 1995 he was a board member of the Swedish Curling Association (Swedish: Svenska Curlingförbundet).

== Teams ==
Season	Skip	Third	Second	Lead	Events
1975–76	Kjell Edfalk (fourth)	Roger Svanberg	Bengt Cederwall (skip)	Mats Olofsson	SMCC 1976 (silver); WCC 1976 (4th)

== Personal life ==
Olofsson's son is Swedish curler Nils Olofsson-Runudde, who played for Sweden in the 1998 World Junior Curling Championships.
