= Kjell Edfalk =

Swedish male curler

- Curler ♂
- Born: 21 December 1945 (age 80)

Team
- Curling club: CK Oden, Östersund

Curling career
- Member Association: Sweden
- World Championship: 1 (1976)
Medal record
Curling
Swedish Men's Championship
Silver medal – second place	1976

Kjell Alexander Edfalk (born 21 December 1945) is a Swedish curler.

His team competed for Sweden in the 1976 World Men's championship, because it was decided that the 1976 Swedish championship team from IF GÖTA (skip Jens Håkansson) was too young for the World Championship and so they went to the Worlds instead.

== Teams ==
Season	Skip	Third	Second	Lead	Events
1975–76	Kjell Edfalk (fourth)	Roger Svanberg	Bengt Cederwall (skip)	Mats Olofsson	SMCC 1976 (silver); WCC 1976 (4th)
