= Martin Plüss (curler) =

Swiss curler

- Curler ♂

Team
- Curling club: CC Olten, Olten

Curling career
- Member Association: Switzerland
- World Championship: 1 (1976)
Medal record
Curling
World Championships
Bronze medal – third place	1976 Duluth
Swiss Men's Championship
Gold medal – first place	1976

Martin Plüss is a former Swiss curler.

He is a 1976 World Men's bronze medallist and a 1976 Swiss men's curling champion.

== Teams ==
Season	Skip	Third	Second	Lead	Events
1975–76	Adolf Aerni	Martin Sägesser	Martin Plüss	Robert Stettler	SMCC 1976 (gold); WCC 1976 (bronze)
