= 2012 Canadian Masters Curling Championships =

- Host city: Boucherville, Quebec; Saint-Lambert, Quebec
- Arena: Club de curling Boucherville; Club de curling Saint-Lambert
- Dates: March 26–April 1
- Men's winner: Newfoundland and Labrador
- Curling club: Bally Haly G&CC, St. John's
- Skip: Toby McDonald
- Third: Wayne Hamilton
- Second: Lloyd Powell
- Lead: Paul Aitken
- Finalist: Quebec (Lawren Steventon)
- Women's winner: Saskatchewan
- Curling club: Saskatoon-Granite CC, Saskatoon
- Skip: Merle Kopach
- Third: Audrey Crossan
- Second: Linda Delver
- Lead: Rae Wilson
- Finalist: Ontario (Joyce Potter)

The 2012 Canadian Masters Curling Championships were held from March 26 to April 1 at the Club de curling Boucherville and the Club de curling Saint-Lambert in Boucherville and Saint-Lambert, Quebec.

The games played were split between the two venues; the games listed on sheets A through C were played at the Club de curling Boucherville, and the games listed on sheets D through G were played at the Club de curling Saint-Lambert.

== Men ==
=== Teams ===
The teams are listed as follows:

Province	Skip	Third	Second	Lead	Locale
Alberta	Colin Griffith	Rob Griffith	Murray Gummer	Dave Hay	Grande Prairie Curling Club, Grande Prairie
British Columbia	Rick Pughe	John Zwarych	Jack Finnbogasson	Bob Byrne	Royal City Curling Club, New Westminster
Manitoba	Ron Westcott	Bob Jenion	Bob Boughey	Gary Smith	Fort Rouge Curling Club, Winnipeg
New Brunswick	David Sullivan	Charlie Sullivan	Roland Lord	Jeff Mulherin	Capital Winter Club, Fredericton
Newfoundland and Labrador	Toby McDonald	Wayne Hamilton	Lloyd Powell	Paul Aitken	Bally Haly Golf & Curling Club, St. John's
Northern Ontario	Paul Carr	Glen Fossum	Ken Ketonen	Ed Koivula	Port Arthur Curling Club, Thunder Bay
Northwest Territories	Jack MacKinnon	Allen Hartman	Garry Tkachuk	Ben McDonald	Yellowknife Curling Club, Yellowknife
Nova Scotia	Alan Darragh	Reid Romkey	John Darragh	Glenn Josephson	Dartmouth Curling Club, Dartmouth
Ontario	Mike Dorey	Brian Henderson	Gary Houghton	Paul Knight	Guelph Curling Club, Guelph
Quebec	Lawren Steventon	Mike Carson	Jean-Marie Bouchard	Malcolm Baines	Glenmore Curling Club, Dollard-des-Ormeaux
Saskatchewan	Eugene Hritzuk	Verne Anderson	Lloyd Lisitza	Paul Tetreault	Nutana Curling Club, Saskatoon
Yukon	Craig Tuton	Gordon Zealand	Pat Marcoff	Clarence Jack	Whitehorse Curling Club, Whitehorse

=== Round-robin standings ===
Final round-robin standings

Key
Teams to Playoffs

Pool A	Skip	W	L
Newfoundland and Labrador	Toby McDonald	6	2
Quebec	Lawren Steventon	6	2
Nova Scotia	Alan Darragh	5	3
Northern Ontario	Paul Carr	4	4
British Columbia	Rick Pughe	4	4
New Brunswick	David Sullivan	0	8

Pool B	Skip	W	L
Manitoba	Ron Westcott	7	1
Saskatchewan	Eugene Hritzuk	6	2
Ontario	Mike Dorey	4	4
Alberta	Colin Griffith	4	4
Northwest Territories	Jack MacKinnon	1	7
Yukon	Craig Tuton	1	7

=== Round-robin results ===
All times listed in Eastern Standard Time (UTC-5).

==== Draw 1 ====
Monday, March 26, 13:30

Sheet A	1	2	3	4	5	6	7	8	Final
Yukon (Tuton)	0	0	0	0	X	X	X	X	0
Manitoba (Westcott)	3	2	4	1	X	X	X	X	10

Sheet B	1	2	3	4	5	6	7	8	Final
Northwest Territories (MacKinnon)	0	0	0	2	0	2	0	0	4
Alberta (Griffith)	1	0	2	0	4	0	1	1	9

Sheet C	1	2	3	4	5	6	7	8	Final
Saskatchewan (Hritzuk)	1	0	1	1	0	2	1	0	6
Ontario (Dorey)	0	2	0	0	2	0	0	1	5

==== Draw 2 ====
Monday, March 26, 20:00

Sheet D	1	2	3	4	5	6	7	8	Final
New Brunswick (Sullivan)	0	1	0	0	0	2	X	X	3
British Columbia (Pughe)	3	0	1	3	2	0	X	X	9

Sheet E	1	2	3	4	5	6	7	8	Final
Newfoundland and Labrador (McDonald)	0	1	0	0	3	2	1	1	8
Northern Ontario (Carr)	3	0	2	1	0	0	0	0	6

Sheet G	1	2	3	4	5	6	7	8	Final
Nova Scotia (Darragh)	1	0	0	1	2	2	0	1	7
Quebec (Steventon)	0	3	1	0	0	0	2	0	6

==== Draw 4 ====
Tuesday, March 27, 12:00

Sheet A	1	2	3	4	5	6	7	8	Final
Ontario (Dorey)	1	1	0	0	1	2	1	X	6
Northwest Territories (MacKinnon)	0	0	0	2	0	0	0	X	2

Sheet B	1	2	3	4	5	6	7	8	Final
Saskatchewan (Hritzuk)	0	2	0	1	0	0	2	0	5
Manitoba (Westcott)	1	0	2	0	2	0	0	3	8

Sheet C	1	2	3	4	5	6	7	8	Final
Alberta (Griffith)	1	0	3	2	1	X	X	X	7
Yukon (Tuton)	0	1	0	0	0	X	X	X	1

Tuesday, March 27, 13:00

Sheet D	1	2	3	4	5	6	7	8	Final
Northern Ontario (Carr)	0	0	0	2	0	2	0	1	5
Quebec (Steventon)	2	1	0	0	2	0	1	0	6

Sheet E	1	2	3	4	5	6	7	8	Final
New Brunswick (Sullivan)	1	0	0	1	0	0	1	1	4
Nova Scotia (Darragh)	0	1	2	0	1	1	0	0	5

Sheet F	1	2	3	4	5	6	7	8	9	Final
British Columbia (Pughe)	2	0	0	0	2	0	1	0	2	7
Newfoundland and Labrador (McDonald)	0	1	2	0	0	1	0	1	0	5

==== Draw 6 ====
Tuesday, March 27, 19:00

Sheet A	1	2	3	4	5	6	7	8	Final
Northern Ontario (Carr)	3	0	0	2	0	1	0	0	6
New Brunswick (Sullivan)	0	0	1	0	1	0	2	1	5

Sheet B	1	2	3	4	5	6	7	8	Final
Quebec (Steventon)	1	0	0	0	1	1	1	X	4
Newfoundland and Labrador (McDonald)	0	1	1	4	0	0	0	X	6

Sheet C	1	2	3	4	5	6	7	8	Final
Nova Scotia (Darragh)	1	0	3	2	1	0	2	X	9
British Columbia (Pughe)	0	1	0	0	0	2	0	X	3

Tuesday, March 27, 20:00

Sheet E	1	2	3	4	5	6	7	8	Final
Alberta (Griffith)	1	0	1	0	0	2	0	0	4
Ontario (Dorey)	0	2	0	2	2	0	1	2	9

Sheet F	1	2	3	4	5	6	7	8	Final
Manitoba (Westcott)	1	0	1	0	2	0	0	2	6
Northwest Territories (MacKinnon)	0	0	0	1	0	1	2	0	4

Sheet G	1	2	3	4	5	6	7	8	Final
Yukon (Tuton)	1	1	0	0	0	X	X	X	2
Saskatchewan (Hritzuk)	0	0	5	3	5	X	X	X	13

==== Draw 7 ====
Wednesday, March 28, 9:00

Sheet A	1	2	3	4	5	6	7	8	Final
Alberta (Griffith)	0	1	0	0	2	0	1	X	4
Quebec (Steventon)	1	0	2	2	0	1	0	X	6

Sheet B	1	2	3	4	5	6	7	8	Final
Yukon (Tuton)	0	0	0	2	0	1	X	X	3
British Columbia (Pughe)	1	1	2	0	4	0	X	X	8

Sheet C	1	2	3	4	5	6	7	8	Final
Ontario (Dorey)	2	0	2	0	0	2	1	X	7
Northern Ontario (Carr)	0	1	0	2	1	0	0	X	4

Wednesday, March 28, 10:00

Sheet E	1	2	3	4	5	6	7	8	Final
Northwest Territories (MacKinnon)	0	0	2	0	0	1	1	0	4
Newfoundland and Labrador (McDonald)	0	2	0	2	0	0	0	1	5

Sheet F	1	2	3	4	5	6	7	8	Final
New Brunswick (Sullivan)	0	0	1	0	0	1	X	X	2
Saskatchewan (Hritzuk)	1	1	0	4	1	0	X	X	7

Sheet G	1	2	3	4	5	6	7	8	Final
Manitoba (Westcott)	1	0	0	0	0	2	0	X	3
Nova Scotia (Darragh)	0	0	2	1	2	0	2	X	7

==== Draw 9 ====
Wednesday, March 28, 19:00

Sheet A	1	2	3	4	5	6	7	8	Final
Saskatchewan (Hritzuk)	2	0	0	0	1	0	1	0	4
British Columbia (Pughe)	0	0	2	0	0	1	0	2	5

Sheet B	1	2	3	4	5	6	7	8	Final
Northern Ontario (Carr)	0	2	0	2	1	0	3	X	8
Northwest Territories (MacKinnon)	1	0	2	0	0	1	0	X	4

Sheet C	1	2	3	4	5	6	7	8	Final
Manitoba (Westcott)	1	1	0	1	2	0	0	X	5
New Brunswick (Sullivan)	0	0	1	0	0	0	1	X	2

Wednesday, March 28, 19:30

Sheet D	1	2	3	4	5	6	7	8	Final
Yukon (Tuton)	0	0	1	0	0	1	0	X	2
Nova Scotia (Darragh)	1	0	0	1	2	0	4	X	8

Sheet F	1	2	3	4	5	6	7	8	Final
Quebec (Steventon)	3	0	2	0	0	1	1	X	7
Ontario (Dorey)	0	1	0	2	1	0	0	X	4

Sheet G	1	2	3	4	5	6	7	8	Final
Alberta (Griffith)	3	1	0	0	0	0	1	1	6
Newfoundland and Labrador (McDonald)	0	0	1	1	1	1	0	0	4

==== Draw 11 ====
Thursday, March 29, 13:00

Sheet B	1	2	3	4	5	6	7	8	Final
Nova Scotia (Darragh)	0	1	1	0	1	0	2	0	5
Saskatchewan (Hritzuk)	1	0	0	2	0	2	0	2	7

Sheet C	1	2	3	4	5	6	7	8	Final
Quebec (Steventon)	1	1	0	1	1	0	1	X	5
Northwest Territories (MacKinnon)	0	0	0	0	0	1	0	X	1

Thursday, March 29, 14:00

Sheet D	1	2	3	4	5	6	7	8	Final
Newfoundland and Labrador (McDonald)	0	1	0	1	1	0	1	X	4
Ontario (Dorey)	0	0	1	0	0	2	0	X	3

Sheet E	1	2	3	4	5	6	7	8	Final
British Columbia (Pughe)	0	0	0	1	0	X	X	X	1
Manitoba (Westcott)	2	1	1	0	2	X	X	X	6

Sheet F	1	2	3	4	5	6	7	8	Final
Northern Ontario (Carr)	0	1	0	1	0	0	0	X	2
Alberta (Griffith)	0	0	2	0	2	1	2	X	7

Sheet G	1	2	3	4	5	6	7	8	9	Final
New Brunswick (Sullivan)	0	0	1	0	2	3	0	0	0	6
Yukon (Tuton)	2	0	0	1	0	0	2	1	1	7

==== Draw 13 ====
Friday, March 30, 8:30

Sheet A	1	2	3	4	5	6	7	8	Final
Northwest Territories (MacKinnon)	0	1	0	1	0	0	2	X	4
Saskatchewan (Hritzuk)	2	0	2	0	1	1	0	X	6

Sheet B	1	2	3	4	5	6	7	8	Final
Ontario (Dorey)	0	0	2	0	2	1	0	X	5
Yukon (Tuton)	0	0	0	1	0	0	1	X	2

Sheet C	1	2	3	4	5	6	7	8	Final
Newfoundland and Labrador (McDonald)	0	2	0	2	2	0	0	1	7
Nova Scotia (Darragh)	0	0	1	0	0	3	1	0	5

Sheet D	1	2	3	4	5	6	7	8	Final
Manitoba (Westcott)	2	0	5	0	1	0	1	X	9
Alberta (Griffith)	0	1	0	2	0	1	0	X	4

Sheet E	1	2	3	4	5	6	7	8	Final
Quebec (Steventon)	0	2	0	1	0	2	0	1	6
New Brunswick (Sullivan)	2	0	0	0	1	0	0	0	3

Sheet G	1	2	3	4	5	6	7	8	Final
British Columbia (Pughe)	0	0	0	1	0	0	2	0	3
Northern Ontario (Carr)	1	0	0	0	1	1	0	1	4

==== Draw 15 ====
Friday, March 30, 15:30

Sheet A	1	2	3	4	5	6	7	8	9	Final
Nova Scotia (Darragh)	1	0	1	0	1	1	2	0	0	6
Northern Ontario (Carr)	0	3	0	1	0	0	0	2	1	7

Sheet B	1	2	3	4	5	6	7	8	Final
Newfoundland and Labrador (McDonald)	0	0	4	0	0	0	4	X	8
New Brunswick (Sullivan)	1	0	0	0	1	2	0	X	4

Sheet C	1	2	3	4	5	6	7	8	Final
British Columbia (Pughe)	2	0	0	1	0	0	1	X	4
Quebec (Steventon)	0	3	0	0	0	4	0	X	7

Sheet E	1	2	3	4	5	6	7	8	Final
Saskatchewan (Hritzuk)	0	2	0	2	0	3	0	1	8
Alberta (Griffith)	0	0	1	0	2	0	1	0	4

Sheet F	1	2	3	4	5	6	7	8	Final
Northwest Territories (MacKinnon)	4	3	0	0	2	X	X	X	9
Yukon (Tuton)	0	0	1	1	0	X	X	X	2

Sheet G	1	2	3	4	5	6	7	8	Final
Ontario (Dorey)	0	0	2	0	1	0	1	1	5
Manitoba (Westcott)	2	1	0	1	0	2	0	0	6

=== Crossovers ===
==== A3 vs. B3 ====
Saturday, March 31, 14:00

Sheet C	1	2	3	4	5	6	7	8	Final
Nova Scotia (Darragh)	1	0	0	3	0	0	1	0	5
Ontario (Dorey)	0	1	1	0	1	1	0	5	9

==== A4 vs. B4 ====
Saturday, March 31, 14:00

Sheet B	1	2	3	4	5	6	7	8	Final
Northern Ontario (Carr)	2	3	0	2	0	2	X	X	9
Alberta (Griffith)	0	0	1	0	1	0	X	X	2

==== A5 vs. B5 ====
Saturday, March 31, 14:00

Sheet A	1	2	3	4	5	6	7	8	Final
British Columbia (Pughe)	0	0	0	1	0	2	0	X	3
Northwest Territories (MacKinnon)	1	0	1	0	1	0	3	X	6

==== A6 vs. B6 ====
Saturday, March 31, 9:00

Sheet G	1	2	3	4	5	6	7	8	Final
New Brunswick (Sullivan)	1	0	0	0	1	0	1	0	3
Yukon (Tuton)	0	0	2	0	0	2	0	1	5

=== Playoffs ===
Semifinals
A1	Newfoundland and Labrador	6
B2	Saskatchewan	5
A2	Quebec	5
B1	Manitoba	4

Final
A1	Newfoundland and Labrador	10
A2	Quebec	4
Bronze-medal game
B2	Saskatchewan	3
B1	Manitoba	6

==== Semifinals ====
Saturday, March 31, 14:00

Sheet D	1	2	3	4	5	6	7	8	Final
Newfoundland and Labrador (McDonald)	0	1	0	4	1	0	0	0	6
Saskatchewan (Hritzuk)	2	0	1	0	0	1	0	1	5

Sheet E	1	2	3	4	5	6	7	8	9	Final
Quebec (Steventon)	0	0	1	0	1	1	0	1	1	5
Manitoba (Westcott)	0	2	0	0	0	0	2	0	0	4

==== Bronze-medal game ====
Sunday, April 1, 9:30

Sheet F	1	2	3	4	5	6	7	8	Final
Saskatchewan (Hritzuk)	0	0	2	0	1	0	0	X	3
Manitoba (Westcott)	0	1	0	2	0	2	1	X	6

==== Final ====
Sunday, April 1, 14:00

Sheet G	1	2	3	4	5	6	7	8	Final
Newfoundland and Labrador (McDonald)	3	0	1	0	0	6	X	X	10
Quebec (Steventon)	0	2	0	2	0	0	X	X	4

== Women ==
=== Teams ===
The teams are listed as follows:

Province	Skip	Third	Second	Lead	Locale
Alberta	Judy Morgan	Ollie Zapisocki	Jan Hardy	Marlene Boucher	Avonair Curling Club, Edmonton
British Columbia	Beverly Skinner	Wendy Archer	Rosemarie Fenrich	Betty Raymond	Summerland Curling Club, Summerland
Manitoba	Joyce McDougall	Linda Van Daele	Cheryl Orr	Karen Dunbar	Brandon Curling Club, Brandon
New Brunswick	Connie Bothwell	Isabel Yeamans	Nancy Siroid	Helen MacDonald	Capital Winter Club, Fredericton
Northern Ontario	Marion Clark	Barbara Ward	Tannis Ferguson	Bev Junnila	Port Arthur Curling Club, Thunder Bay
Nova Scotia	Frankie Amos	Sharon Clarke	Marjorie McKay	Breanda Nearing	Mayflower Curling Club, Halifax
Ontario	Joyce Potter	Diana Favel	Jennifer Langley	Brenda Moffitt	Rideau Curling Club, Ottawa
Quebec	Rolande Madore	Michèle Pagé	Pauline Pagé	Lucille Daigle	Chicoutimi Curling Club, Chicoutimi
Saskatchewan	Merle Kopach	Audrey Crossan	Linda Delver	Rae Wilson	Saskatoon-Granite Curling Club, Saskatoon
Yukon	Pat Banks	Elaine Sumner	Ev Pasichnyk	Lorraine Stick	Whitehorse Curling Club, Whitehorse

=== Round-robin standings ===
Final round-robin standings

Key
Teams to Playoffs

Province	Skip	W	L
Ontario	Joyce Potter	7	2
Northern Ontario	Marion Clark	7	2
Saskatchewan	Merle Kopach	7	2
Manitoba	Joyce McDougall	6	3
New Brunswick	Connie Bothwell	5	4
Nova Scotia	Frankie Amos	5	4
Quebec	Rolande Madore	4	5
Alberta	Judy Morgan	2	7
British Columbia	Beverly Skinner	2	7
Yukon	Pat Banks	0	9

=== Round-robin results ===
All times listed in Eastern Standard Time (UTC-5).

==== Draw 1 ====
Monday, March 26, 14:30

Sheet D	1	2	3	4	5	6	7	8	Final
Nova Scotia (Amos)	4	0	0	0	1	0	0	0	5
New Brunswick (Bothwell)	0	2	1	2	0	1	1	1	8

Sheet E	1	2	3	4	5	6	7	8	Final
Northern Ontario (Clark)	0	0	3	2	0	1	4	1	11
Yukon (Banks)	3	2	0	0	1	0	0	0	6

Sheet F	1	2	3	4	5	6	7	8	Final
Saskatchewan (Kopach)	1	0	0	1	1	0	1	1	5
Ontario (Potter)	0	0	2	0	0	2	0	0	4

Sheet G	1	2	3	4	5	6	7	8	Final
Alberta (Morgan)	0	0	0	0	3	4	0	1	8
British Columbia (Skinner)	1	1	1	1	0	0	2	0	6

==== Draw 2 ====
Monday, March 26, 20:00

Sheet F	1	2	3	4	5	6	7	8	9	Final
Manitoba (McDougall)	0	0	1	0	0	2	0	2	2	7
Quebec (Madore)	0	2	0	1	1	0	1	0	0	5

==== Draw 3 ====
Tuesday, March 27, 8:30

Sheet A	1	2	3	4	5	6	7	8	Final
British Columbia (Skinner)	0	0	1	0	2	0	1	X	4
Ontario (Potter)	1	1	0	2	0	4	0	X	8

Sheet B	1	2	3	4	5	6	7	8	9	Final
New Brunswick (Bothwell)	3	0	1	2	0	1	0	0	1	8
Yukon (Banks)	0	3	0	0	1	0	2	1	0	7

Sheet C	1	2	3	4	5	6	7	8	Final
Nova Scotia (Amos)	1	0	3	1	0	3	0	1	9
Alberta (Morgan)	0	2	0	0	2	0	3	0	7

Tuesday, March 27, 9:30

Sheet E	1	2	3	4	5	6	7	8	9	Final
Quebec (Madore)	1	0	0	0	2	0	0	2	0	5
Saskatchewan (Kopach)	0	1	0	1	0	2	1	0	1	6

Sheet G	1	2	3	4	5	6	7	8	Final
Manitoba (McDougall)	1	0	1	0	0	X	X	X	2
Northern Ontario (Clark)	0	1	0	5	3	X	X	X	9

==== Draw 5 ====
Tuesday, March 27, 15:30

Sheet A	1	2	3	4	5	6	7	8	Final
Yukon (Banks)	0	0	0	0	X	X	X	X	0
Nova Scotia (Amos)	3	1	2	1	X	X	X	X	7

Sheet B	1	2	3	4	5	6	7	8	Final
Saskatchewan (Kopach)	0	0	4	0	3	0	1	X	8
Manitoba (McDougall)	1	1	0	2	0	1	0	X	5

Tuesday, March 27, 16:30

Sheet E	1	2	3	4	5	6	7	8	Final
British Columbia (Skinner)	0	0	2	0	0	0	1	X	3
New Brunswick (Bothwell)	2	1	0	1	1	2	0	X	7

Sheet F	1	2	3	4	5	6	7	8	Final
Northern Ontario (Clark)	0	0	3	0	2	1	3	X	9
Alberta (Morgan)	1	1	0	1	0	0	0	X	3

Sheet G	1	2	3	4	5	6	7	8	Final
Ontario (Potter)	0	0	0	1	2	0	1	3	7
Quebec (Madore)	1	1	0	0	0	1	0	0	3

==== Draw 8 ====
Wednesday, March 28, 13:00

Sheet A	1	2	3	4	5	6	7	8	Final
Manitoba (McDougall)	0	1	0	1	0	1	0	1	4
New Brunswick (Bothwell)	0	0	1	0	1	0	1	0	3

Sheet B	1	2	3	4	5	6	7	8	Final
British Columbia (Skinner)	0	2	0	0	0	0	3	3	8
Northern Ontario (Clark)	3	0	3	1	1	1	0	0	9

Wednesday, March 28, 14:00

Sheet E	1	2	3	4	5	6	7	8	Final
Ontario (Potter)	3	1	2	0	2	0	1	X	9
Alberta (Morgan)	0	0	0	2	0	4	0	X	6

Sheet F	1	2	3	4	5	6	7	8	Final
Quebec (Madore)	0	0	2	0	3	0	0	0	5
Nova Scotia (Amos)	1	0	0	2	0	2	0	1	6

Sheet G	1	2	3	4	5	6	7	8	Final
Saskatchewan (Kopach)	2	0	3	1	1	1	X	X	8
Yukon (Banks)	0	1	0	0	0	0	X	X	1

==== Draw 10 ====
Thursday, March 29, 9:00

Sheet A	1	2	3	4	5	6	7	8	Final
Northern Ontario (Clark)	0	1	0	2	0	2	0	1	6
Quebec (Madore)	1	0	1	0	1	0	1	0	4

Sheet C	1	2	3	4	5	6	7	8	Final
Saskatchewan (Kopach)	1	3	0	3	0	0	3	X	10
British Columbia (Skinner)	0	0	2	0	1	1	0	X	4

Thursday, March 29, 10:00

Sheet D	1	2	3	4	5	6	7	8	Final
Yukon (Banks)	0	0	0	0	X	X	X	X	0
Ontario (Potter)	4	5	1	1	X	X	X	X	11

Sheet E	1	2	3	4	5	6	7	8	9	Final
Manitoba (McDougall)	0	2	0	1	1	0	1	0	1	6
Nova Scotia (Amos)	0	0	2	0	0	2	0	1	0	5

Sheet F	1	2	3	4	5	6	7	8	Final
Alberta (Morgan)	1	2	0	3	0	0	0	0	6
New Brunswick (Bothwell)	0	0	3	0	3	1	2	1	10

==== Draw 12 ====
Thursday, March 29, 19:00

Sheet A	1	2	3	4	5	6	7	8	Final
Nova Scotia (Amos)	0	2	0	0	1	0	X	X	3
Saskatchewan (Kopach)	4	0	1	2	0	2	X	X	9

Sheet B	1	2	3	4	5	6	7	8	9	Final
Manitoba (McDougall)	0	0	0	1	2	1	0	2	1	7
Alberta (Morgan)	3	1	1	0	0	0	1	0	0	6

Thursday, March 29, 19:30

Sheet E	1	2	3	4	5	6	7	8	Final
Yukon (Banks)	0	0	1	0	1	0	X	X	2
British Columbia (Skinner)	5	1	0	1	0	2	X	X	9

Sheet F	1	2	3	4	5	6	7	8	Final
Ontario (Potter)	2	0	3	0	0	0	5	X	10
Northern Ontario (Clark)	0	1	0	1	1	1	0	X	4

Sheet G	1	2	3	4	5	6	7	8	Final
Quebec (Madore)	1	0	1	3	0	1	1	X	7
New Brunswick (Bothwell)	0	0	0	0	1	0	0	X	1

==== Draw 14 ====
Friday, March 30, 12:00

Sheet B	1	2	3	4	5	6	7	8	Final
Northern Ontario (Clark)	2	0	1	2	1	1	X	X	7
Saskatchewan (Kopach)	0	1	0	0	0	0	X	X	1

Sheet C	1	2	3	4	5	6	7	8	Final
Alberta (Morgan)	0	2	0	1	0	1	0	X	4
Quebec (Madore)	2	0	2	0	1	0	2	X	7

Sheet D	1	2	3	4	5	6	7	8	Final
British Columbia (Skinner)	1	2	4	0	0	2	0	1	10
Nova Scotia (Amos)	0	0	0	2	4	0	1	0	7

Sheet E	1	2	3	4	5	6	7	8	Final
New Brunswick (Bothwell)	1	0	0	0	3	0	1	0	5
Ontario (Potter)	0	3	1	1	0	2	0	1	8

Sheet G	1	2	3	4	5	6	7	8	Final
Yukon (Banks)	2	0	0	2	0	2	0	0	6
Manitoba (McDougall)	0	2	1	0	4	0	1	1	9

==== Draw 16 ====
Friday, March 30, 19:00

Sheet A	1	2	3	4	5	6	7	8	Final
Alberta (Morgan)	1	0	5	0	1	0	0	X	7
Yukon (Banks)	0	1	0	2	0	1	1	X	5

Sheet B	1	2	3	4	5	6	7	8	Final
Quebec (Madore)	0	2	2	2	4	1	X	X	11
British Columbia (Skinner)	3	0	0	0	0	0	X	X	3

Sheet C	1	2	3	4	5	6	7	8	9	Final
Ontario (Potter)	0	2	1	0	2	0	1	0	1	7
Manitoba (McDougall)	2	0	0	1	0	1	0	2	0	6

Sheet E	1	2	3	4	5	6	7	8	9	Final
Nova Scotia (Amos)	0	2	4	0	1	0	0	0	1	8
Northern Ontario (Clark)	1	0	0	1	0	2	2	1	0	7

Sheet G	1	2	3	4	5	6	7	8	Final
New Brunswick (Bothwell)	1	1	1	0	1	0	0	3	7
Saskatchewan (Kopach)	0	0	0	3	0	1	1	0	5

==== Draw 17 ====
Saturday, March 31, 9:00

Sheet A	1	2	3	4	5	6	7	8	Final
New Brunswick (Bothwell)	0	0	1	0	0	0	X	X	1
Northern Ontario (Clark)	3	1	0	2	1	2	X	X	9

Sheet B	1	2	3	4	5	6	7	8	Final
Nova Scotia (Amos)	1	0	2	0	2	0	3	X	8
Ontario (Potter)	0	2	0	1	0	1	0	X	4

Sheet C	1	2	3	4	5	6	7	8	Final
Quebec (Madore)	2	2	1	3	X	X	X	X	8
Yukon (Banks)	0	0	0	0	X	X	X	X	0

Sheet D	1	2	3	4	5	6	7	8	Final
Alberta (Morgan)	0	1	0	0	2	0	0	X	3
Saskatchewan (Kopach)	2	0	2	1	0	1	1	X	7

Sheet F	1	2	3	4	5	6	7	8	Final
British Columbia (Skinner)	0	1	0	0	3	0	0	X	4
Manitoba (McDougall)	1	0	4	3	0	1	2	X	11

=== Playoffs ===
Semifinals
1	Ontario	9
4	Manitoba	6
3	Saskatchewan	5
2	Northern Ontario	2

Final
1	Ontario	5
3	Saskatchewan	9
Bronze-medal game
4	Manitoba	7
2	Northern Ontario	10

==== Semifinals ====
Saturday, March 31, 14:00

Sheet F	1	2	3	4	5	6	7	8	Final
Ontario (Potter)	2	0	0	2	0	1	3	1	9
Manitoba (McDougall)	0	2	1	0	3	0	0	0	6

Sheet G	1	2	3	4	5	6	7	8	Final
Saskatchewan (Kopach)	0	1	0	0	0	2	2	0	5
Northern Ontario (Clark)	0	0	0	0	1	0	0	1	2

==== Bronze-medal game ====
Sunday, April 1, 9:30

Sheet G	1	2	3	4	5	6	7	8	9	Final
Manitoba (McDougall)	0	4	0	0	0	2	1	0	0	7
Northern Ontario (Clark)	2	0	1	1	2	0	0	1	3	10

==== Final ====
Sunday, April 1, 14:00

Sheet F	1	2	3	4	5	6	7	8	Final
Ontario (Potter)	0	2	0	2	0	1	0	X	5
Saskatchewan (Kopach)	1	0	1	0	3	0	4	X	9
