= 2011 Canadian Masters Curling Championships =

- Host city: Winnipeg, Manitoba
- Arena: Assiniboine Memorial Curling Club
- Dates: March 30 - April 5
- Men's winner: British Columbia
- Curling club: Kelowna CC, Kelowna
- Skip: Garry Gelowitz
- Third: Rob Koffski
- Second: Brad Cmolik
- Lead: Dennis Case
- Finalist: Manitoba (John Usackis)
- Women's winner: Manitoba
- Curling club: Brandon CC; Brandon, Manitoba
- Skip: Joyce McDougall
- Third: Linda Van Daele
- Second: Cheryl Orr
- Lead: Karen Dunbar
- Finalist: British Columbia (Karin Host)

The 2011 Canadian Masters Curling Championships were held from March 30 to April 5 at the Assiniboine Memorial Curling Club in Winnipeg, Manitoba. In the men's final, Garry Gelowitz of British Columbia defeated John Usackis of Manitoba with a tally of 6–3, while Joyce McDougall of Manitoba defeated Karin Host of British Columbia 11–3 in the women's final.

== Men ==
=== Teams ===
Team	Skip	Third	Second	Lead	Locale
Alberta	Mel Bates	Fred McKenzie	Tom Longmore	Ian Duncan	Avonair CC, Edmonton
British Columbia	Garry Gelowitz	Rob Koffski	Brad Cmolik	Dennis Case	Kelowna CC, Kelowna
Manitoba	John Usackis	Dave Romano	Lyle Dew	Gene Lazaruk	Lac du Bonnet CC, Lac du Bonnet
Manitoba Host	Neil Schmidt	Brian Masters	Walter Wagner	Norm Pruden	St. Vital CC, Winnipeg
New Brunswick	Peter Taylor	Peter Myers	Al Donhaney	Frank Belyea	Carlton CC, Saint John
Northern Ontario	Ron Kowalchuk	Ed Pedersen	Ernie Surkan	John Bird	Port Arthur CC, Thunder Bay
Northwest Territories	Paul Delorey	Gary Hoffman	Gordon Norberg	George Low	Hay River CC, Hay River
Nova Scotia	Alan Marshall	Richard Clattenburg	Rowan Clattenburg	Bruce Tymchuk	Glooscap CC, Kentville
Ontario	Layne Noble	Rick Bachand	Randy Garland	Cal Hegge	Ottawa CC, Ottawa
Quebec	Paul Gagnon	Marcel Bouchard	Paul-Armand Boudreault	Rene Plourde	Riverbend CC, Alma
Saskatchewan	Art Assman	Ignace Baranieski	Les Kun	Leonard Underwood	Tartan CC, Regina
Yukon	Craig Tuton	Gord Zealand	Clarence Jack	Barry Mole	Whitehorse CC, Whitehorse

=== Standings ===
Black Group	W	L
Ontario	6	0
British Columbia	5	1
Alberta	3	3
New Brunswick	2	4
Nova Scotia	2	4
Manitoba Host	1	5

Red Group	W	L
Manitoba	5	1
Quebec	4	2
Northern Ontario	3	3
Saskatchewan	3	3
Northwest Territories	1	5
Yukon	1	5

=== Round robin ===
==== Draw 1 ====
Thursday, March 31, 8:30 am

Team	1	2	3	4	5	6	7	8	Final
Yukon (Tuton)	0	0	4	0	0	1	0	0	5
Northern Ontario (Kowalchuk)	1	2	0	1	1	0	1	1	7

Team	1	2	3	4	5	6	7	8	Final
Manitoba (Usackis)	0	0	1	1	1	1	0	1	5
Quebec (Gagnon)	2	0	0	0	0	0	1	0	3

Team	1	2	3	4	5	6	7	8	Final
Saskatchewan (Assman)	2	3	5	0	5	X	X	X	15
Northwest Territories (Delorey)	0	0	0	1	0	X	X	X	1

==== Draw 2 ====
Thursday, March 31, 12:00 pm

Team	1	2	3	4	5	6	7	8	Final
British Columbia (Gelowitz)	0	2	0	1	0	2	0	1	6
Manitoba Host (Schmidt)	1	0	1	0	2	0	1	0	5

Team	1	2	3	4	5	6	7	8	9	Final
Alberta (Bates)	0	0	2	0	2	0	2	0	1	7
Nova Scotia (Marshall)	2	1	0	1	0	1	0	1	0	6

Team	1	2	3	4	5	6	7	8	Final
Ontario (Noble)	0	1	2	0	2	0	2	X	7
New Brunswick (Taylor)	1	0	0	2	0	1	0	X	4

==== Draw 3 ====
Thursday, March 31, 3:30 pm

Team	1	2	3	4	5	6	7	8	Final
Saskatchewan (Assman)	0	0	1	0	2	0	0	2	5
Quebec (Gagnon)	1	1	0	1	0	0	1	0	4

Team	1	2	3	4	5	6	7	8	Final
Yukon (Tuton)	1	0	3	2	1	1	0	X	8
Northwest Territories (Delorey)	0	0	0	0	0	0	1	X	1

Team	1	2	3	4	5	6	7	8	Final
Manitoba (Usackis)	3	3	0	0	2	0	1	X	9
Northern Ontario (Kowalchuk)	0	0	2	1	0	2	0	X	5

==== Draw 4 ====
Thursday, March 31, 7:00 pm

Team	1	2	3	4	5	6	7	8	Final
New Brunswick (Taylor)	1	0	0	0	0	0	0	0	1
British Columbia (Gelowitz)	0	0	0	1	1	1	1	0	4

Team	1	2	3	4	5	6	7	8	Final
Ontario (Noble)	0	5	0	0	0	3	0	0	8
Nova Scotia (Marshall)	1	0	0	2	1	0	0	0	5

Team	1	2	3	4	5	6	7	8	9	Final
Alberta (Bates)	1	0	2	0	3	0	1	0	1	8
Manitoba Host (Schmidt)	0	2	0	1	0	1	0	3	0	7

==== Draw 5 ====
Friday, April 1, 8:30 am

Team	1	2	3	4	5	6	7	8	Final
Manitoba (Usackis)	2	0	1	3	0	1	X	X	7
Northwest Territories (Delorey)	0	1	0	0	1	0	X	X	2

Team	1	2	3	4	5	6	7	8	Final
Northern Ontario (Kowalchuk)	1	0	0	0	1	0	1	0	3
Quebec (Gagnon)	0	1	1	0	0	2	0	1	5

Team	1	2	3	4	5	6	7	8	Final
Saskatchewan (Assman)	2	3	0	0	2	X	X	X	7
Yukon (Tuton)	0	0	1	1	0	X	X	X	2

==== Draw 6 ====
Friday, April 1, 12:00 pm

Team	1	2	3	4	5	6	7	8	Final
Alberta (Bates)	0	1	0	0	1	0	X	X	2
British Columbia (Gelowitz)	2	0	3	1	0	2	X	X	8

Team	1	2	3	4	5	6	7	8	Final
Ontario (Noble)	1	2	1	1	0	1	0	0	6
Manitoba Host (Schmidt)	0	0	0	0	2	0	2	1	5

Team	1	2	3	4	5	6	7	8	Final
Nova Scotia (Marshall)	2	3	1	0	0	0	2	1	9
New Brunswick (Taylor)	0	0	0	2	2	1	0	0	5

==== Draw 7 ====
Friday, April 1, 3:30 pm

Team	1	2	3	4	5	6	7	8	Final
Yukon (Tuton)	0	0	1	1	0	1	0	0	3
Manitoba (Usackis)	1	1	0	0	2	0	3	0	7

Team	1	2	3	4	5	6	7	8	Final
Saskatchewan (Assman)	0	1	0	0	2	0	0	1	4
Northern Ontario (Kowalchuk)	1	0	0	1	0	1	3	0	6

Team	1	2	3	4	5	6	7	8	Final
Quebec (Gagnon)	1	0	0	2	0	2	0	1	6
Northwest Territories (Delorey)	0	0	1	0	2	0	2	0	5

==== Draw 8 ====
Friday, April 1, 7:00 pm

Team	1	2	3	4	5	6	7	8	Final
Ontario (Noble)	0	0	0	0	1	1	2	X	4
Alberta (Bates)	0	0	0	1	0	0	0	X	1

Team	1	2	3	4	5	6	7	8	Final
New Brunswick (Taylor)	1	0	2	0	2	0	2	0	7
Manitoba Host (Schmidt)	0	2	0	1	0	1	0	1	5

Team	1	2	3	4	5	6	7	8	Final
British Columbia (Gelowitz)	2	0	0	1	1	0	3	0	7
Nova Scotia (Marshall)	0	0	1	0	0	1	0	0	2

==== Draw 9 ====
Saturday, April 2, 8:30 am

Team	1	2	3	4	5	6	7	8	Final
Northwest Territories (Delorey)	1	0	0	0	0	0	X	X	1
Northern Ontario (Kowalchuk)	0	0	5	0	2	2	X	X	9

Team	1	2	3	4	5	6	7	8	Final
Manitoba (Usackis)	1	0	1	0	2	0	0	1	5
Saskatchewan (Assman)	0	2	0	1	0	1	0	0	4

Team	1	2	3	4	5	6	7	8	Final
Yukon (Tuton)	1	0	2	0	1	1	0	0	5
Quebec (Gagnon)	0	2	0	3	0	0	1	1	7

==== Draw 10 ====
Saturday, April 2, 12:00 pm

Team	1	2	3	4	5	6	7	8	Final
Manitoba Host (Schmidt)	2	0	1	0	0	4	X	X	7
Nova Scotia (Marshall)	0	0	0	1	1	0	X	X	2

Team	1	2	3	4	5	6	7	8	Final
Ontario (Noble)	0	1	0	3	0	0	1	0	5
British Columbia (Gelowitz)	0	0	1	0	0	2	0	1	4

Team	1	2	3	4	5	6	7	8	Final
Alberta (Bates)	0	0	0	0	2	0	X	X	2
New Brunswick (Taylor)	1	1	1	2	0	5	X	X	10

==== Draw 11 ====
Saturday, April 2, 3:30 pm

Team	1	2	3	4	5	6	7	8	Final
Northwest Territories (Delorey)	0	1	2	0	1	0	1	1	6
Manitoba Host (Schmidt)	0	0	0	2	0	1	0	0	3

Team	1	2	3	4	5	6	7	8	9	Final
Northern Ontario (Kowalchuk)	2	0	2	1	0	2	0	0	0	7
Nova Scotia (Marshall)	0	2	0	0	2	0	2	1	1	8

==== Draw 12 ====
Saturday, April 2, 7:00 pm

Team	1	2	3	4	5	6	7	8	Final
Quebec (Gagnon)	2	0	1	0	2	0	0	X	5
New Brunswick (Taylor)	0	2	0	1	0	0	0	X	3

Team	1	2	3	4	5	6	7	8	9	Final
Manitoba (Usackis)	0	2	0	1	0	0	0	2	0	5
British Columbia (Gelowitz)	1	0	1	0	1	1	1	0	1	6

Team	1	2	3	4	5	6	7	8	Final
Yukon (Tuton)	1	0	0	2	2	0	0	X	5
Alberta (Bates)	0	5	1	0	0	3	1	X	10

Team	1	2	3	4	5	6	7	8	Final
Ontario (Noble)	0	2	0	2	1	0	0	1	6
Saskatchewan (Assman)	0	0	1	0	0	2	1	0	4

=== Ranking games ===
Sunday, April 3, 9:00 am

Team	1	2	3	4	5	6	7	8	Final
Northwest Territories (Delorey)	0	2	0	0	0	X	X	X	2
Manitoba Host (Schmidt)	3	0	3	1	3	X	X	X	10

Sunday, April 3, 2:30 pm

Team	1	2	3	4	5	6	7	8	Final
Alberta (Bates)	0	0	1	1	0	1	0	X	3
Northern Ontario (Kowalchuk)	0	2	0	0	1	0	2	X	5

Team	1	2	3	4	5	6	7	8	Final
Nova Scotia (Marshall)	0	0	2	0	0	1	X	X	3
Saskatchewan (Assman)	2	1	0	2	1	0	X	X	6

Team	1	2	3	4	5	6	7	8	Final
New Brunswick (Taylor)	1	3	0	2	1	X	X	X	7
Yukon (Tuton)	0	0	1	0	0	X	X	X	1

=== Playoffs ===
Page playoff system
B1	Ontario	5
R1	Manitoba	7
B2	British Columbia	6
R2	Quebec	2

Semifinal
B1	Ontario	5
B2	British Columbia	9

Gold Medal Game
R1	Manitoba	3
B2	British Columbia	6

==== 1 vs. 1 ====
Monday, April 4, 2:30 pm

Team	1	2	3	4	5	6	7	8	Final
Ontario (Noble)	1	0	0	2	2	0	0	0	5
Manitoba (Usackis)	0	1	2	0	0	2	0	2	7

==== 2 vs, 2 ====
Monday, April 4, 2:30 pm

Team	1	2	3	4	5	6	7	8	Final
British Columbia (Gelowitz)	0	0	2	1	0	2	1	0	6
Quebec (Gagnon)	0	1	0	0	1	0	0	0	2

==== Semifinal ====
Tuesday, April 5, 9:00 am

Team	1	2	3	4	5	6	7	8	Final
Ontario (Noble)	2	1	0	2	0	0	0	0	5
British Columbia (Gelowitz)	0	0	2	0	2	0	2	3	9

==== Final ====
Tuesday, April 5, 2:30 pm

Team	1	2	3	4	5	6	7	8	Final
Manitoba (Usackis)	1	0	1	0	0	1	0	0	3
British Columbia (Gelowitz)	0	1	0	3	1	0	1	0	6

== Women ==
=== Teams ===
Team	Skip	Third	Second	Lead	Locale
Yukon	Pat Banks	Elaine Sumner	Ev Pasichnyk	Lorraine Stick	Whitehorse CC, Whitehorse
British Columbia	Karin Host	Dianne Tasaka	Lorraine Warn	Betty Dharmasetia	Richmond CC, Richmond
Alberta	Simone Handfield	Dorothy Sutton	Judy Morgan	Barb Sheptycki	Saville Sports Centre, Edmonton
Saskatchewan	Nancy Kerr	Anita Ford	Dawn Obleman	Wendy Leach	Highland CC, Regina
Manitoba	Joyce McDougall	Linda Van Daele	Cheryl Orr	Karen Dunbar	Brandon CC, Brandon
Northern Ontario	Marion Clark	Marlene De Lorenzi	Tannis Ferguson	Jeanne Adams	Port Arthur CC, Thunder Bay
Ontario	Joyce Potter	Diana Favel	Jennifer Langley	Brenda Moffitt	Rideau CC, Ottawa
Quebec	Louise Fortier	Lise Maltais	Pauline Bouffard	Lucille Dombrowski	Jacques Cartier CC, Quebec City
New Brunswick	Marlene Vaughan	Ellen Brennan	Rose Donovan	Nancy Porter	Thistle St. Andrews CC, Saint John
Nova Scotia	Suzanne Green	Audrey Dorey	Norma Reid	Karen Romkey	Mayflower CC/Wolfville CC, Halifax/Wolfville

=== Standings ===
Black Group	W	L
Manitoba	6	0
Nova Scotia	3	3
Saskatchewan	3	3
Northern Ontario	2	4
Yukon	0	6

Red Group	W	L
British Columbia	5	1
Ontario	4	2
Alberta	4	2
New Brunswick	2	4
Quebec	1	5

=== Round robin ===
==== Draw 1 ====
Thursday, March 31, 8:30 am

Team	1	2	3	4	5	6	7	8	Final
Nova Scotia (Green)	0	3	0	0	3	3	1	X	10
Yukon (Banks)	4	0	1	1	0	0	0	X	6

Team	1	2	3	4	5	6	7	8	Final
Quebec (Fortier)	1	0	1	0	0	2	0	0	4
Northern Ontario (Clark)	0	2	0	1	1	0	1	1	6

Team	1	2	3	4	5	6	7	8	9	Final
Manitoba (McDougall)	0	2	0	0	2	0	1	0	1	6
Saskatchewan (Kerr)	0	0	0	2	0	1	0	2	0	5

==== Draw 2 ====
Thursday, March 31, 12:00 pm

Team	1	2	3	4	5	6	7	8	Final
New Brunswick (Vaughan)	0	0	0	1	1	0	1	X	3
Ontario (Potter)	2	1	2	0	0	2	0	X	7

Team	1	2	3	4	5	6	7	8	Final
British Columbia (Host)	0	2	0	3	1	0	1	X	7
Alberta (Handfield)	0	0	2	0	0	1	0	X	3

==== Draw 3 ====
Thursday, March 31, 3:30 pm

Team	1	2	3	4	5	6	7	8	Final
Nova Scotia (Green)	2	0	1	1	2	1	0	0	7
Saskatchewan (Kerr)	0	1	0	0	0	0	0	0	1

Team	1	2	3	4	5	6	7	8	Final
Northern Ontario (Clark)	1	3	0	1	0	2	1	X	8
Yukon (Banks)	0	0	2	0	1	0	0	X	3

==== Draw 4 ====
Thursday, March 31, 7:00 pm

Team	1	2	3	4	5	6	7	8	Final
New Brunswick (Vaughan)	0	2	0	4	2	1	0	0	9
Quebec (Fortier)	1	0	2	0	0	0	0	0	3

Team	1	2	3	4	5	6	7	8	9	Final
Ontario (Potter)	3	0	1	1	0	1	0	1	0	7
Alberta (Handfield)	0	1	0	0	5	0	1	0	1	8

Team	1	2	3	4	5	6	7	8	Final
British Columbia (Host)	0	0	0	0	0	1	0	X	1
Manitoba (McDougall)	0	1	0	2	1	0	1	X	5

==== Draw 5 ====
Friday, April 1, 8:30 am

Team	1	2	3	4	5	6	7	8	Final
Manitoba (McDougall)	3	1	2	0	0	4	X	X	10
Northern Ontario (Clark)	0	0	0	3	1	0	X	X	4

Team	1	2	3	4	5	6	7	8	Final
Nova Scotia (Green)	0	0	1	0	0	0	X	X	1
New Brunswick (Vaughan)	2	1	0	2	1	1	X	X	7

Team	1	2	3	4	5	6	7	8	Final
Saskatchewan (Kerr)	1	2	3	3	X	X	X	X	9
Yukon (Banks)	0	0	0	0	X	X	X	X	0

==== Draw 6 ====
Friday, April 1, 12:00 pm

Team	1	2	3	4	5	6	7	8	Final
Quebec (Fortier)	0	1	0	0	0	0	0	0	1
Alberta (Handfield)	1	0	0	1	1	2	2	1	8

Team	1	2	3	4	5	6	7	8	Final
British Columbia (Host)	2	1	1	0	0	1	0	2	7
Ontario (Potter)	0	0	0	1	4	0	1	0	6

==== Draw 7 ====
Friday, April 1, 3:30 pm

Team	1	2	3	4	5	6	7	8	Final
Nova Scotia (Green)	0	0	0	2	0	3	1	2	8
Northern Ontario (Clark)	1	1	1	0	1	0	0	0	4

Team	1	2	3	4	5	6	7	8	Final
Manitoba (McDougall)	0	0	2	3	1	1	2	0	9
Yukon (Banks)	1	2	0	0	0	0	0	0	3

==== Draw 8 ====
Friday, April 1, 7:00 pm

Team	1	2	3	4	5	6	7	8	9	Final
Ontario (Potter)	1	0	0	1	0	0	0	3	1	6
Saskatchewan (Kerr)	0	0	2	0	1	1	1	0	0	5

Team	1	2	3	4	5	6	7	8	Final
Quebec (Fortier)	1	0	0	0	0	1	0	0	2
British Columbia (Host)	0	4	2	1	1	0	0	0	8

Team	1	2	3	4	5	6	7	8	Final
New Brunswick (Vaughan)	0	1	0	1	0	0	0	0	2
Alberta (Handfield)	2	0	1	0	2	3	0	0	8

==== Draw 9 ====
Saturday, April 2, 8:30 am

Team	1	2	3	4	5	6	7	8	Final
Nova Scotia (Green)	0	0	2	0	0	0	X	X	2
Manitoba (McDougall)	1	3	0	1	3	0	X	X	8

Team	1	2	3	4	5	6	7	8	Final
Northern Ontario (Clark)	1	0	3	0	1	0	0	0	5
Saskatchewan (Kerr)	0	3	0	1	0	3	1	0	8

==== Draw 10 ====
Saturday, April 2, 12:00 pm

Team	1	2	3	4	5	6	7	8	Final
Alberta (Handfield)	1	4	0	0	0	1	2	X	8
Yukon (Banks)	0	0	1	1	1	0	0	X	3

Team	1	2	3	4	5	6	7	8	9	Final
Quebec (Fortier)	4	0	0	0	1	0	3	1	0	9
Ontario (Potter)	0	2	1	2	0	4	0	0	1	10

Team	1	2	3	4	5	6	7	8	Final
British Columbia (Host)	0	2	0	3	3	0	X	X	8
New Brunswick (Vaughan)	0	0	1	0	0	1	X	X	2

==== Draw 11 ====
Saturday, April 2, 3:30 pm

Team	1	2	3	4	5	6	7	8	Final
Quebec (Fortier)	2	2	3	1	X	X	X	X	8
Yukon (Banks)	0	0	0	0	X	X	X	X	0

Team	1	2	3	4	5	6	7	8	Final
Nova Scotia (Green)	0	0	0	2	0	0	0	X	2
British Columbia (Host)	1	2	2	0	1	1	2	X	9

Team	1	2	3	4	5	6	7	8	Final
Ontario (Potter)	0	2	4	1	0	0	0	0	7
Northern Ontario (Clark)	1	0	0	0	2	0	0	0	3

==== Draw 12 ====
Saturday, April 2, 7:00 pm

Team	1	2	3	4	5	6	7	8	Final
Saskatchewan (Kerr)	1	1	0	1	2	0	2	0	7
Alberta (Handfield)	0	0	2	0	0	1	0	1	4

Team	1	2	3	4	5	6	7	8	Final
Manitoba (McDougall)	4	2	4	1	X	X	X	X	11
New Brunswick (Vaughan)	0	0	0	0	X	X	X	X	0

=== Tiebreakers ===
Sunday, April 3, 9:00 am

Team	1	2	3	4	5	6	7	8	Final
Saskatchewan (Kerr)	0	1	0	2	0	0	1	0	4
Nova Scotia (Green)	1	0	2	0	1	0	0	1	5

Team	1	2	3	4	5	6	7	8	Final
Ontario (Potter)	2	2	0	1	0	1	1	2	9
Alberta (Handfield)	0	0	2	0	1	0	0	0	3

=== Ranking games ===
Sunday, April 3, 9:00 am

Team	1	2	3	4	5	6	7	8	Final
New Brunswick (Vaughan)	2	0	2	2	2	2	X	X	10
Northern Ontario (Clark)	0	2	0	0	0	0	X	X	2

Sunday, April 3, 2:30 pm

Team	1	2	3	4	5	6	7	8	Final
Saskatchewan (Kerr)	1	0	1	1	2	0	3	0	8
Alberta (Handfield)	0	2	0	0	0	2	0	2	6

Team	1	2	3	4	5	6	7	8	Final
Yukon (Banks)	0	2	1	2	0	1	0	1	7
Quebec (Fortier)	1	0	0	0	4	0	1	0	6

=== Playoffs ===
Page playoff system
B1	Manitoba	7
R1	British Columbia	6
B2	Nova Scotia	8
R2	Ontario	3

Semifinal
R1	British Columbia	6
B2	Nova Scotia	5

Gold Medal Game
B1	Manitoba	11
R1	British Columbia	5

==== 1 vs. 1 ====
Monday, April 4, 2:30 pm

Team	1	2	3	4	5	6	7	8	9	Final
Manitoba (McDougall)	0	2	0	2	1	0	0	1	1	7
British Columbia (Host)	1	0	0	0	0	4	1	0	0	6

==== 2 vs. 2 ====
Monday, April 4, 2:30 pm

Team	1	2	3	4	5	6	7	8	Final
Ontario (Potter)	0	1	0	2	0	0	0	0	3
Nova Scotia (Green)	2	0	1	0	1	1	3	0	8

==== Semifinal ====
Tuesday, April 5, 9:00 am

Team	1	2	3	4	5	6	7	8	Final
British Columbia (Host)	0	0	1	0	1	2	1	1	6
Nova Scotia (Green)	2	1	0	2	0	0	0	0	5

==== Final ====
Tuesday, April 5, 2:30 pm

Team	1	2	3	4	5	6	7	8	Final
Manitoba (McDougall)	2	2	0	1	0	3	3	0	11
British Columbia (Host)	0	0	1	0	4	0	0	0	5
