= Toby McDonald =

Canadian curler (1951–2025)

Toby McDonald ONL
- Curler ♂
- Born: April 30, 1951
- Died: January 24, 2025 (aged 73)

Team
- Curling club: St. John's CC, St. John's, NL, Bally Haly G&CC, St. John's, NL

Curling career
- Member Association: Newfoundland and Labrador
- Brier: 6 (1976, 1979, 1981, 1992, 1998, 2002)
- World Championship: 1 (1976)
Medal record
Curling
Macdonald Brier
Representing Newfoundland
Gold medal – first place	1976 Regina

Tobias Francis McDonald ONL KC (April 30, 1951 – January 24, 2025) was a Canadian curler, curling coach and lawyer from St. John's, Newfoundland and Labrador.

== Biography ==
McDonald was born in 1951, the son of Mary (née Power) and Tobias McDonald. At the national level, he won the 1976 Macdonald Brier, as a member of the first-ever team from Newfoundland and Labrador to win the Brier. The team represented Canada at the 1976 Air Canada Silver Broom World Championship, finishing in 9th place with a 2–7 record, Canada's worst ever finish at the World Men's Curling Championship.

McDonald returned to the Brier in 1979, playing third for Jeff Thomas. At the Brier, the team went 3–8. McDonald skipped his own rink at the Brier in 1981. He led his rink of Jim Miller, John Allan and Neil Young to a 3–8 record. He didn't return to the Brier until 1992 as the alternate for Newfoundland, skipped by Glenn Goss. There, the team finished 6–5. McDonald was back to skipping at the Brier in 1998. He led his team of Wayne Hamilton, Lloyd Powell and Paul Withers to a 4–7 record. McDonald made his final Brier appearance in 2002, as the alternate for Mark Noseworthy rink. Noseworthy led the team to a 4–7 record.

McDonald coached the Canadian men's curling team at the 2006 Winter Olympics where they won the gold medal.

== Personal life ==
McDonald was a graduate of the University of New Brunswick, and earned an honorary doctorate of Laws from Memorial University of Newfoundland. McDonald was married to Shelly (née Keough) for 35 years before she died. He went on to remarry Noreen Byrne. He had two children. He died on 24 January 2025, at the age of 73.

== Teams ==
Season	Skip	Third	Second	Lead	Alternate	Events
1967–68	Marty Dalton	Tobi McDonald	Douglas Ryan	Richard Feehan		CJCC 1968 (T10th)
1975–76	Jack MacDuff	Toby McDonald	Doug Hudson	Ken Templeton		Brier 1976 (gold); WCC 1976 (9th)
1978–79	Jeff Thomas	Toby McDonald	Peter Hollett	Ken Thomas		Brier 1979 (11th)
1979–80	Toby McDonald	Shelly McDonald	John Allan	Ann Bowering		CMxCC 1980 (bronze)
1980–81	Toby McDonald	Jim Miller	John Allan	Neil Young		Brier 1981 (11th)
1991–92	Glenn Goss	Geoff Cunningham	John Allan	Neil Young	Toby McDonald	Brier 1992 (6th)
1996–97	Toby McDonald	Paul Withers	Lloyd Powell	Paul Green		
1997–98	Toby McDonald	Wayne Hamilton	Lloyd Powell	Paul Withers	Wayne Young	Brier 1998 (9th)
2001–02	Mark Noseworthy	Bill Jenkins	Randy Turpin	Ian Kerr	Toby McDonald	Brier 2002 (9th)
2011–12	Toby McDonald	Wayne Hamilton	Lloyd Powell	Paul Aitken		CMaCC 2012 (gold)

== Record as a coach of national teams ==
Year	Tournament, event	National team	Place
2006	2006 Winter Olympics	Canada (men)	1st place, gold medalist(s)

== Awards ==
- Ross Harstone Sportsmanship Award: 1998.
- Member of the Order of Newfoundland and Labrador, appointed 8 December 2006.
