= Chris Neufeld =

Canadian curler and coach

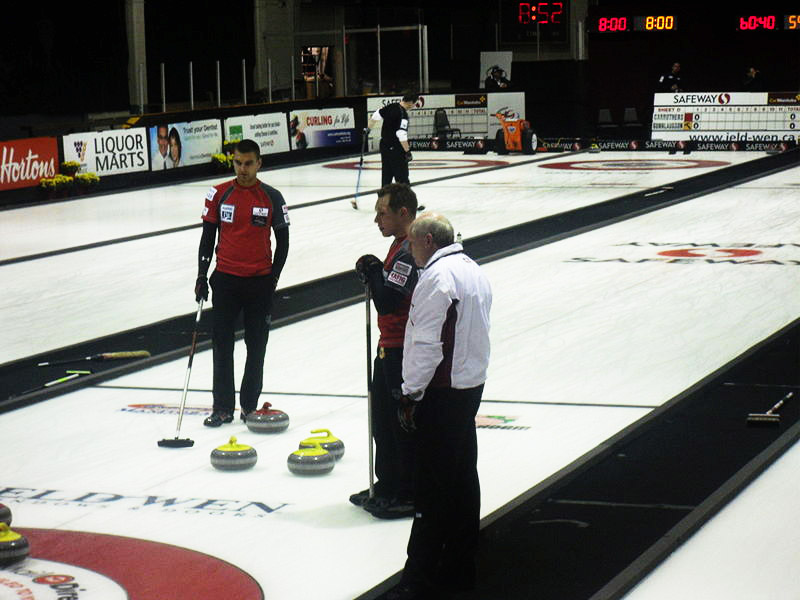
Chris Neufeld with the front end of the Mike McEwen team during 2010 Safeway Championship

Christopher D. Neufeld (born April 21, 1957, in Steinbach, Manitoba) is a Canadian curler from Steinbach, Manitoba. He played second for Vic Peters in the senior division.

Neufeld was raised in Steinbach and attended the Steinbach Regional Secondary School where he met and competed at the high school level with Peters. After moving to Winnipeg and going pro, Neufeld and Peters curled their entire careers together, and during that time won 3 Provincial Championships, 1 National Championship in 1992 and also won the Manitoba Senior Men's Championships in 2008.

Neufeld's sons Denni Neufeld curled with Jason Gunnlaugson and B.J. Neufeld curled with Matt Dunstone until December 2024.

== Personal life ==
Neufeld is married and has three children. He now lives in Gimli, Manitoba where he works as a realtor for Interlake Real Estate.
