= Swedish Men's Curling Championship =

Curling competition in Sweden

The Swedish Men's Curling Championship (Swedish: Svenska mästerskap i curling för herrar, SM lag herrar) is the national championship of men's curling in Sweden. It has been held annually since 1917 (one of the oldest national championship in curling).

== List of champions ==
Year	Champion team (City, curling club)	Skip	Third	Second	Lead
1917	Stockholms CK (Stockholm)	A. Olsson	Karl-Erik Wahlberg	Birger Olsson	Klas Fåhraeus
1918	Åre CK (Stockholm)	Carl O. Rahm	Carl Wilhelm Petersén	Johan Petter Åhlén	Hugo Hjelmar
1919	Åre CK (Stockholm)	Carl O. Rahm	Carl Wilhelm Petersén	Johan Petter Åhlén	Erik Åkerlund
1920	Royal Caledonian CC (Scotland)	John McLeod	M. Hunter-Kennedy	J. F. Ross	J. Burnett
1921	Amatörföreningens CK (Stockholm)	Claes Hultberg	Elof Lindskog	Oscar Dahlin	A. B. Johansson
1922	Stocksunds CK (Danderyd)	Erik Åkerlund	Otto Gernandt	Einar Eklund	Gunnar Janzén
1923	Norrköpings CK (Norrköping)	Knut Bartels	Alfred Hedenström	Ernst August Caap	Dan Arfwidsson
1924	Stocksunds CK (Danderyd)	Erik Åkerlund	Einar Eklund	Gunnar Janzén	Atle Sylvén
1926	Åre CK (Stockholm)	Carl O. Rahm	Eric Hedeman-Gade	Hugo Hjelmar	A. B. Johansson
1927	Engelbrekts CK (Stockholm)	Jonas Arnström	John Roberg	Walfrid Andersson	Ivan Dale
1928	Amatörföreningens CK (Stockholm)	Victor Wetterström	Gunnar Malmqvist	Oscar Dahlin	Carl Hull
1929	Bråvalla CK (Norrköping)	Knut Bartels	Ernst August Caap	Alfred Hedenström	Wille Hellman
1930	Fjällgårdens CK (Stockholm)	Carl Wilhelm Petersén	Carl Axel Pettersson	S. B. Sahlin	Helge Burman
1931	Stockeby CK (Danderyd)	Eskil Ljungqvist	Carl Wikström	I. Lundqvist	Erik Nilsson
1932	CK Tre Kronor (Stockholm)	Erik Åkerlund	Emil Henriques	Rune Åkerlund	Gunnar Rönn
1933	CK Bore (Stockholm)	Rolf Wessman	K. Stenport	Torild Brockman	E. Hammarsjö
1934	Stockholms CK (Stockholm)	Karl Erik Wahlberg	Lars Edshammar	G. Braun	Max Hoffman
1935	Amatörföreningens CK (Stockholm)	Gunnar Malmqvist	Thure Sandström	Oscar Dahlin	Carl Fredrik Andersson
1936	CK Bore (Stockholm)	Rolf Wessman	Torild Brockman	Melcher Säwensten	Gunnar Säwensten
1937	Kronprinsens CK (Stockholm)	Hubertus Ubbens	Rolf Graff-Lonnevig	Johan Sande Junior	Bjarne Angell
1938	Kronprinsens CK (Stockholm)	Hubertus Ubbens	Rolf Graff-Lonnevig	Johan Sande Junior	Hilding Paulson
1939	Amatörföreningens CK (Stockholm)	Victor Wetterström	Thure Sandström	Anders Håkansson	Oscar Dahlin
1940	Sundsvalls CK (Sundsvall)	Arvid Norell	Richard Norlin	Thure Norlin	Gösta Undin
1941	Sundsvalls CK (Sundsvall)	Arvid Norell	Richard Norlin	Thure Norlin	Gösta Undin
1942	Sundbybergs CK (Sundbyberg)	Axel Nordenstedt	Eric Linderman	Sten Kindblom	Gösta Jacobsson
1943	Sundsvalls CK (Sundsvall)	Arvid Norell	Richard Norlin	Thure Norlin	Gösta Undin
1944	Haga CK (Stockholm)	Arne Ahlström	Georg Settelby	Gunnar Landroth	Bertil Swartling
1945	Örebro CK (Örebro)	Fredrik Anell	Gustav Byléhn	Erik Berglund	Håkan Bergå
1946	Kronprinsens CK (Stockholm)	Johan Sande Junior	Hilding Paulson	Fred Sjödin	Folke Hallin
1947	Fjällgårdens CK (Stockholm)	Bertel Skiöld	Erik Åkerlund	Olle Hammarström	Arthur Ballin
1948	Linköpings CK (Linköping)	Carl Arthur Jakobsson	Tage Hällborn	Martin Fransson	Sten Jakobsson
1949	Fjällgårdens CK (Stockholm)	Bertel Skiöld	Per Eric Nilsson	Arthur Ballin	Bo Fosselius
1950	Åre CK (Stockholm)	Åke Danielsson	Magnus Berge	Curt Jonsson	Axel Nilsson
1951	Fjällgårdens CK (Stockholm)	Bertel Skiöld	Totte Åkerlund	Olle Hammarström	Arthur Ballin
1952	Fjällgårdens CK (Stockholm)	Per Eric Nilsson	Sven Eklund	Lars Ryberg	Rolf Aleman
1953	Linköpings CK (Linköping)	Thedde Svensson	Erland Ragnar	Olof Bohman	Eric Linde
1954	Fjällgårdens CK (Stockholm)	Per Eric Nilsson	Sven Eklund	Bertel Skiöld	Bengt Öhrman
1955	Fjällgårdens CK (Stockholm)	Per Eric Nilsson	Sven Eklund	Lennart Söderström	Bengt Öhrman
1956	Norrköpings CK (Norrköping)	Gösta Månsson	Ivan Torbrand	Karl Axel Bergwall	Uno Liljegren
1957	Linköpings CK (Linköping)	Thure Berggren	Einar Sandebring	Hans Lönnberg	Sven Eriksson
1958	Linköpings CK (Linköping)	Thure Berggren	Einar Sandebring	Hans Lönnberg	Sven Eriksson
1959	Fjällgårdens CK (Stockholm)	Per Eric Nilsson	Sven Eklund	Totte Åkerlund	Lars Ryberg
1960	Hedemora CK (Hedemora)	Birger Larsson	Gunnar Gråhns	Gunnar Lengquist	Nils Hedlund
1961	Åredalens CK (Åre)	Curt Jonsson	Gustav Larsson	Magnus Berge	John-Allan Månsson
1962	Norrköpings CK (Norrköping)	Rolf Arfwidsson	Knut Bartels	Per Ivar Rydgren	Arne Stern
1963	Åredalens CK (Åre)	Curt Jonsson	Gustav Larsson	Magnus Berge	John-Allan Månsson
1964	Åredalens CK (Åre)	Curt Jonsson	Gustav Larsson	Magnus Berge	John-Allan Månsson
1965	Örebro CK (Örebro)	Tore Rydman	Gunnar Kullendorf	Sigge Rydén	Börje Holmgren
1966	AIK (Solna)	Lars Dracke	Olle Gewalt	Ove Ingels	Sven Fryksenius
1967	Fjällgårdens CK (Stockholm)	Bob Woods	Totte Åkerlund	Bengt af Kleen	Ove Söderström
1968	IF GÖTA (Karlstad)	Kjell Grengmark	Roy Berglöf	Sven Carlsson	Stig Håkansson
1969	Djursholms CK (Danderyd)	Christer Wessel	Kjell Oscarius	Claes Göran Carlman	Bengt Oscarius
1970	Stallmästaregårdens CK (Stockholm)	Tom Schaeffer	Claes Källén	Sture Lindén	Christer Källén
1971	IF GÖTA (Karlstad)	Kjell Grengmark	Roy Berglöf	Erik Berglöf	Lars-Erik Håkansson
1972	Djursholms CK (Danderyd)	Kjell Oscarius	Tom Schaeffer	Boa Carlman	Bengt Oscarius
1973	Djursholms CK (Danderyd)	Kjell Oscarius	Bengt Oscarius	Tom Schaeffer	Boa Carlman
1974	Sundsvalls CK (Sundsvall)	Jan Ullsten	Tom Berggren	Anders Grahn	Roger Bredin
1975	Härnösands CK (Härnösand)	Axel Kamp	Ragnar Kamp	Björn Rudström	Christer Mårtenson
1976	IF GÖTA (Karlstad)	Jens Håkansson	Thomas Håkansson	Per Lindeman	Lars Lindgren
1977	Härnösands CK (Härnösand)	Ragnar Kamp	Håkan Rudström	Björn Rudström	Christer Mårtenson
1978	Djursholms CK (Danderyd)	Tom Schaeffer	Svante Ödman	Fred Ridderstad	Boa Carlman
1979	Sundsvalls CK (Sundsvall)	Karl-Erik Bruneflod	Anders Grahn	Ken Bruneflod	Roger Bredin
1980	Karlstads CK (Karlstad)	Ragnar Kamp	Thomas Håkansson	Håkan Ståhlbro	Lars Lindgren
1981	Härnösands CK (Härnösand)	Jan Ullsten	Anders Thidholm	Anders Nilsson	Hans Söderström
1982	Karlstads CK (Karlstad)	Connie Östlund	Tony Eng	Henrik Holmberg	Anders Svennerstedt
1983	Aros-Curlarna (Västerås)	Inge Granback	Mats Svedberg	Lars Carlsson	Thomas Brinkeborn
1984	Sundsvalls CK (Sundsvall)	Per Carlsén	Jan Strandlund	Tommy Olin	Olle Håkansson
1985	Karlstads CK (Karlstad)	Per Lindeman	Connie Östlund	Carl von Wendt	Bo Andersson
1986	CK ENA (Enköping)	Göran Roxin	Claes Roxin	Björn Roxin	Lars-Eric Roxin
1987	Timrå CK (Timrå)	Thomas Norgren	Jan Strandlund	Lars Strandqvist	Lars Engblom
1988	CK ENA (Enköping)	Claes Roxin	Mats Brisegård	Björn Roxin	Lars-Eric Roxin
1989	Karlstads CK (Karlstad)	Per Lindeman	Lars Lindgren	Göran Åberg	Carl von Wendt
1990	Sollefteå CK (Sollefteå)	Mikael Hasselborg	Hans Nordin	Lars Vågberg	Stefan Hasselborg
1991	Falu CC (Falun)	Per Hedén	Jan Strandlund	Kenneth Rydén	Jan Lundblad
1992	Sundsvalls CK (Sundsvall)	Per Carlsén	Henrik Holmberg	Tommy Olin	Stefan Larsson
1993	Östersunds CK (Östersund)	Peter Lindholm	Tomas Nordin	Magnus Swartling	Peter Narup
1994	Sollefteå CK (Sollefteå)	Mikael Hasselborg	Hans Nordin	Lars Vågberg	Stefan Hasselborg
1995	Sundbybergs CK (Sundbyberg)	Mats Wranå	Peter Larsson	Thomas Winge	Rickard Holmlund
1996	Örnsköldsviks CK (Örnsköldsvik)	Lars-Åke Nordström	Jan Strandlund	Örjan Jonsson	Owe Ljungdahl
1997	Östersunds CK (Östersund)	Peter Lindholm	Tomas Nordin	Magnus Swartling	Peter Narup
1998	Östersunds CK (Östersund)	Peter Lindholm	Tomas Nordin	Magnus Swartling	Peter Narup
1999	Östersunds CK (Östersund)	Peter Lindholm	Tomas Nordin	Magnus Swartling	Peter Narup
2000	Östersunds CK (Östersund)	Peter Lindholm	Tomas Nordin	Magnus Swartling	Peter Narup
2001	Östersunds CK (Östersund)	Peter Lindholm	Tomas Nordin	Magnus Swartling	Peter Narup
2002	Östersunds CK (Östersund)	Peter Lindholm	Tomas Nordin	Magnus Swartling	Ulf Jonsson
2003	Östersunds CK (Östersund)	Peter Lindholm	Tomas Nordin	Magnus Swartling	Peter Narup
2004	Östersunds CK (Östersund)	Peter Lindholm	Tomas Nordin	Magnus Swartling	Peter Narup
2005	Östersunds CK (Östersund)	Peter Lindholm	Tomas Nordin	Magnus Swartling	Peter Narup
2006	Sundsvalls CK (Sundsvall)	Per Carlsén	Mikael Norberg	Rickard Hallström	Fredrik Hallström
2007	Östersunds CK (Östersund)	Peter Lindholm	James Dryburgh	Viktor Kjäll	Anders Eriksson
2008	Sundbybergs CK (Sundbyberg)	Mathias Mabergs	Henrik Edlund	Emil Marklund	David Kallin
2009	Karlstads CK Edin (Karlstad)	Niklas Edin	Sebastian Kraupp	Fredrik Lindberg	Viktor Kjäll
2010	Karlstads CK Edin (Karlstad)	Niklas Edin	Sebastian Kraupp	Fredrik Lindberg	Viktor Kjäll
2011	Lits CK (Östersund)	Kristian Lindström (4th)	Oskar Eriksson (skip)	Alexander Lindström	Henrik Leek

(below teams line-up in order: fourth, third, second, lead, alternate, coach; skips marked bold)

Year	Champion	Runner-up	Bronze
2012	Härnösands CK Team First Hotels (Härnösand); Marcus Hasselborg, Peder Folke, Andreas Prytz, Anton Sandström	Lits CK (Östersund); Oskar Eriksson, Henrik Leek, Alexander Lindström, Kristian Lindström, coach: Kenneth Lindström	Sundsvalls CK Team Certina (Sundsvall); Nils Carlsén, Eric Carlsén, Rickard Hallström, Oskar Sjöström, coach: Fredrik Carlsén
2013	Lits CK (Östersund); Oskar Eriksson, Kristian Lindström, Markus Eriksson, Christoffer Sundgren	Skellefteå CK Eskilsson (Skellefteå); Gustav Eskilsson, Patric Mabergs, Jesper Johansson, Johannes Patz, coach: Flemming Patz	Härnösands CK Team First Hotels (Härnösand); Marcus Hasselborg, Peder Folke, Andreas Prytz, Anton Sandström
2014	Lits CK (Östersund); Oskar Eriksson, Kristian Lindström, Markus Eriksson, Christoffer Sundgren, coach: Kenneth Lindström	Skellefteå CK Eskilsson (Skellefteå); Patric Mabergs, Gustav Eskilsson, Jesper Johansson, Johannes Patz, coach: Flemming Patz	Härnösands CK Team First Hotels (Härnösand); Marcus Hasselborg, Peder Folke, Andreas Prytz, Anton Sandström, Fredrik Nyman; Skellefteå CK Melin (Skellefteå); Jon Melin, Vincent Stenberg, Christoffer Karlsson, Kristofer Blom
2015	Karlstads CK Edin (Karlstad); Niklas Edin, Oskar Eriksson, Kristian Lindström, Christoffer Sundgren, coach: Ingemar Edström, coach: Michael Bernevall	Linköpings CK Pettersson (Linköping); K-G Pettersson, Ulf Johansson, Håkan Nyberg, Rickard Eriksson, alternate: Göran Carlsson	Borlänge CK Team Bevab (Borlänge); Mats Jakobsson, Marcus Haglöf, Jonas Jansson, Anders Karlsson, alternate: Lennart Jakobsson, coach: Anders Rehn; Skellefteå CK Eskilsson (Skellefteå); Patric Mabergs, Gustav Eskilsson, Jesper Johansson, Johannes Patz, coach: Flemming Patz
2016	Karlstads CK Edin (Karlstad); Niklas Edin, Oskar Eriksson, Kristian Lindström, Christoffer Sundgren, coach: Ingemar Edström	Skellefteå CK Eskilsson (Skellefteå); Patric Mabergs, Gustav Eskilsson, Jesper Johansson, Johannes Patz, coach: Flemming Patz	Sundbybergs CK Hasselborg (Sundbyberg); Marcus Hasselborg, Sebastian Kraupp, Vincent Stenberg, Anton Sandström; Sundbybergs CK Team Zip-Up (Sundbyberg); Rasmus Wranå, Fredrik Nyman, Jordan Wåhlin, Max Bäck, coach: Mats Wranå
2017	Sundbybergs CK Team RP (Sundbyberg); Joakim Flyg, Victor Martinsson, Henrik Leek, Kristian Lindström	Göteborgs CK Nygren (Gothenburg); Johan Nygren, Fabian Wingfors, Emil Hermansson, Axel Sjöberg	Skellefteå CK Melin (Skellefteå); Jon Melin, Andreas Granbom, Simon Granbom, Kristofer Blom
2018	Karlstads CK Edin (Karlstad); Niklas Edin, Oskar Eriksson, Rasmus Wranå, Christoffer Sundgren, coach: Fredrik Lindberg	Sundbybergs CK Team RP (Sundbyberg); Kristian Lindström, Henrik Leek, Alexander Lindström, Victor Martinsson, coach: Kenneth Lindström	Skellefteå CK Melin (Skellefteå); Jon Melin, Simon Granbom, Andreas Granbom, Max Bäck; Karlstads CK, Team Colorama (Karlstad); Sebastian Jones, Anton Regosa, Johan Nygren, Daniel Magnusson, coach: Greta Aurell
2019	Karlstads CK Edin (Karlstad); Niklas Edin, Oskar Eriksson, Rasmus Wranå, Christoffer Sundgren, coach: Fredrik Lindberg	Leksands CK Team Dream (Leksand); Fredrik Nyman, Axel Sjöberg, Max Bäck, Victor Martinsson, coach: Olle Brudsten	Karlstads CK Team Colorama (Karlstad); Daniel Magnusson, Johan Nygren, Anton Regosa, Sebastian Jones, Ivar Veszelei, coach: Greta Aurell; Skellefteå CK Team Bryce (Skellefteå); Cameron Bryce, Simon Granbom, Johannes Patz, Filip Stener
2020	Karlstads CK (Karlstad); Niklas Edin, Oskar Eriksson, Rasmus Wranå, Christoffer Sundgren	Karlstads CK (Karlstad); Daniel Magnusson, Robin Ahlberg, Anton Regosa, Sebastian Jones	Norrköpings CK (Norrköping); Alexander Lindström, Albin Eriksson, Axel Rosander, Kristofer Blom; Sundbybergs CK (Sundbyberg); Andreas Andersteg, Kim Svedelid, Rasmus Hansen, Carl-Oscar Pihl
2021	Cancelled due to the COVID-19 pandemic in Sweden		
2022	Mjölby AI CF (Mjölby); Axel Landelius, Alfons Johansson, Olle Moberg, Lars Landelius	Karlstads CK (Karlstad); Daniel Magnusson, Rasmus Israelsson, Robin Ahlberg, Anton Regosa	Falu CC (Falun); Sven Olsson, Anders Haglund, Niclas Svenman, Johan Ceder; Amatörföreningen CK (Sundbyberg); Carl-Oscar Pihl, Joel Westerberg, Måns Winge, Kim Svedelid
2023	Karlstads CK (Karlstad); Oskar Eriksson, Rasmus Wranå, Daniel Magnusson, Christoffer Sundgren	Mjölby AI CF (Mjölby); Axel Landelius, Alfons Johansson, Johan Engqvist, Alexander Palm	Sollefteå CK (Sollefteå); Fredrik Nyman, Patric Mabergs, Simon Olofsson, Johannes Patz CK Granit Gävle (Gävle); Simon Granbom, Axel Sjöberg, Fabian Wingfors, Jacob Hanna
2024	Sollefteå CK (Sollefteå); Fredrik Nyman, Patric Mabergs, Simon Olofsson, Johannes Patz	CK Granit Gävle (Gävle); Simon Granbom, Axel Sjöberg, Fabian Wingfors, Jacob Hanna	Norrköpings CK (Norrköping); Albin Eriksson, Niclas Johansson, Kristofer Blom, Axel Rosander Umeå CK (Umeå); Johan Nygren, Daniel Berggren, Johan Järvenson, Sebastian Lundgren
2025	Amatörföreningen CK (Sundbyberg); Carl-Oscar Pihl, Joel Westerberg, Måns Winge, Kim Svedelid	CK Granit Gävle (Gävle); Simon Granbom, Axel Sjöberg, Olle Moberg, Fabian Wingfors	Sollefteå CK (Sollefteå); Fredrik Nyman, Patric Mabergs, Simon Olofsson, Johannes Patz; Mjölby AI CF (Mjölby); Axel Landelius, Alexander Palm, Johan Engqvist, Alfons Johansson
2026	Sollefteå CK (Sollefteå); Fredrik Nyman, Patric Mabergs, Johannes Patz	Mjölby AI CF (Mjölby); Axel Landelius, Alexander Palm, Johan Engqvist, Alfons Johansson	Sundbybergs CK (Sundbyberg); Vilmer Nygren, Alexander Dryburgh, Jonatan Meyerson, Conrad Schalley; Umeå CK (Umeå); Johan Nygren, Daniel Berggren, Victor Martinsson, Johan Järvenson, Ture Rodling

== See also ==
- Swedish Women's Curling Championship
- Swedish Mixed Curling Championship
- Swedish Mixed Doubles Curling Championship
- Swedish Junior Curling Championships
- Swedish Senior Curling Championships
- Swedish Wheelchair Curling Championship
