= Swedish Senior Curling Championships =

The Swedish Senior Curling Championships (Swedish: Svenska mästerskap i curling för oldboys/oldgirls, SM Oldlag, SM Oldgirls/Oldboys, Senior SM, SM Seniorer, SSM) is an annual curling tournament held to determine the best senior-level men's and women's curling teams in Sweden. Senior level curlers must be over the age of 50 as of June 30 in the year prior to the tournament. It has been held annually since the 1962-1963 season for senior men ("oldboys") and the 1971-1972 season for senior women ("oldgirls"); the championship events are organized by the Swedish Curling Association (Swedish: Svenska Curlingförbundet). The championship teams play at the World Senior Curling Championships the following year.

== Champions ==
=== Men (Oldboys) ===
Year	Champion team (City, curling club)	Skip	Third	Second	Lead	Alternate Coach
1963	Linköpings CK	Thure Berggren	Martin Fransson	Gösta Ziegler	Thedde Svensson	
1964	Östersunds CK	Olle Hallberg	Gustaf Persson	Carl Brinkman	Erik Liljeblad	
1965	Härnösands CK	Nils Kvarby	Olle Söderström	Per Lönnberg	Roland Nässlin (Umeå CK)	
1966	Mariebergs CK (Stockholm)	Gösta Jacobsson	Anton Marmfeldt	Olof Thunström	Helge Engdahl	
1967	Norrköpings CK	Gösta Månsson	K.A Bergvall	Uno Liljegren	Bertil Berg	
1968	Härnösands CK	Nils Kvarby	Göte Häggström	Helge Bergqvist	John Rudström	
1969	Örebro CK	Börje Holmgren	Bengt Thermaenieus	Sigge Ryden	Harry Wikström	
1970	Amatörföreningens CK (Stockholm)	Bengt Carlquist	Lars Tjernberg	Gustav Rudberg	Åke Sundwall	
1971	Karlstads CK	Lennart Hemmingson	Bengt Wallerstedt	Åke Brag	Olle Boman	
1972	Karlstads CK	Lennart Hemmingson	Bengt Wallerstedt	Åke Brag	Olov Boman	
1973	Sundsvalls CK	Karl-Erik Bruneflod	Nils Holm	Karl-Axel Edgren	Sten Lundqvist	
1974	Amatörföreningens CK (Stockholm)	Per Ödlund	Bengt Carlquist	Nils Kristensson	Åke Sundvall	
1975	Norrköpings CK	Rolf Arfwidsson	Knut G. Bartels	Carl W Kalin	Arne Stern	
1976	Norrköpings CK	Urban Caap	Jan Caap	Göran Arthur	Tette Dahl	
1977	Sollefteå CK	Åke Nilsson	Axel Kamp	Sven Jeansson	Curt Hasselborg	
1978	Sollefteå CK	Åke Nilsson	Axel Kamp	Sven Jeansson	Curt Hasselborg	
1979	Sollefteå CK	Åke Nilsson	Axel Kamp	Sven Jeansson	Curt Hasselborg	
1980	Karlstads CK	Rune Forsberg	Kjell Grengmark	Roy Berglöf	Uno Jansson	
1981	Örebro Sportklubbs CS	Åke Lindhlom	Tore Lundberg	Olle Branäs	Gunnar Engvall	
1982	CK Oden (Östersund)	Bengt Cederwall	Ivan Bill	P-O Jonsson	Bernt Bergman	
1983	Stocksunds CK	Bo Möller	Carl-Gustaf Regårdh	Björn Enblad	John Görling	
1984	Karlstads CK	Lennart Hemmingson	Roy Berglöf	Stig Håkansson	Sven Gustafson	
1985	Timrå CK	Axel Eriksson	Rolf Strandqvist	Harry Öhman	Axel Norgren	
1986	Timrå CK	Axel Eriksson	Axel Norgren	Rolf Strandqvist	Rolf Rehnström	
1987	Stocksunds CK	Sune Blomberg	Sten Frykholm	Tommy Sernelin	Arne Lindblom	
1988	Karlstads CK	Lennart Hemmingson	Stig Håkansson	Sven Gustafson	Roy Berglöf	Kjell Grengmark
1989	Djursholms CK	Tom Schaeffer	Svante Ödman	Stig Johnson	Sven Fryksenius	
1990	Karlstads CK	Lennart Hemmingson	Roy Berglöf	Stig Håkansson	Kjell Grengmark	
1991	Sundbybergs CK	Bele Wranå	Birger Swahn	Elof Eriksson	Steen Skölfman	
1992	Karlstads CK	Roy Berglöf	Kjell Grengmark	Stig Håkansson	Sven Gustavsson	
1993	Stocksunds CK	Stig Johnson (Djursholms CK)	Bo Möller	Sven Fryksenius (Magnus Ladulås CK)	Carl-Gustaf Regårdh	
1994	Östersunds CK	Carl-Martin Bergström	Rainer Kristensson	Bertil Hannersjö	Hans Persson	
1995	Sundbybergs CK	Bertil Larson	Leif Johansson	Håkan Berggren	Per Ståhl	
1996	Sundbybergs CK	Bertil Larson	Leif Johansson	Håkan Berggren	Per Ståhl	
1997	Sundbybergs CK	Bertil Larson	Leif Johansson	Håkan Berggren	Per Ståhl	
1998	Linköpings CK	KG Pettersson	Anders Blom	Kåfe Dahlberg	Ingvar Nyström	
1999	Sollefteå CK	Kenneth Svande	Ted Jonsson	Sten-Åke Wånder	Göte Hellberg	
2000	Härnösands CK	Bertil Timan	Anders Timan	Kjell Nylund	Bertil Eriksson	Yngve Jonsson
2001	Örnsköldsviks CK	Hans Öberg	Lars Åke Andersson	Berth Brandell	Wolger Johansson	
2002	Örnsköldsviks CK	Hans Öberg	Lars Åke Andersson	Berth Brandell	Wolger Johansson	
2003	Östersunds CK	Jan-Olov Nässén	Anders Lööf	Mikael Ljungberg	Leif Sätter	
2004	Sundbybergs CK	Bertil Larson	Björn Anderstam	Bertil Löfgren	Lennart Ibsonius	
2005	Leksands CK	Jan Lundblad	Åke Näs	Per Göstas	Sune Halvarsson	Lennart Jakobsson
2006	Härnösands CK	Jan Ullsten	Björn Rudström	Lars Strandqvist	Lars Engblom	
2007	Linköpings CK	Claes Roxin	Göran Roxin	Björn Roxin	Lars-Eric Roxin	
2008	Karlstads CK	Per Lindeman	Carl von Wendt	Bosse Andersson	Gunnar Åberg	
2009	CK Silverstenen (Sala)	Karl Nordlund	Wolger Johansson	Per-Arne Anderson	Owe Larsson	
2010	CK Silverstenen (Sala)	Karl Nordlund	Göran Roxin	Wolger Johansson	Owe Larsson	
2011	Sundsvalls CK	Per Carlsén	Mats Nyberg	Stefan Larsson	Dan Carlsén	Claes-Göran Höglund
2012	Karlstads CK	Connie Östlund	Lars Lindgren	Glenn Franzén	Morgan Fredholm	Stig Sewik
2013	Örnsköldsviks CK	Wolger Johansson	Hans Öberg	Lars-Åke Andersson	Per-Arne Anderson	Karl Nordlund
2014	Karlstads CK	Connie Östlund	Morgan Fredholm	Lars Lindgren	Glenn Franzen	Lennart Carlsson
2015	Karlstads CK	Connie Östlund	Morgan Fredholm	Lars Lindgren	Glenn Franzen	
2016	Sundbybergs CK	Mats Wranå	Mikael Hasselborg	Anders Eriksson	Gerry Wåhlin	
2017	Sundbybergs CK	Mats Wranå	Mikael Hasselborg	Anders Eriksson	Gerry Wåhlin	
2018	Sundbybergs CK	Mats Wranå	Mikael Hasselborg	Anders Eriksson	Gerry Wåhlin	
2019	Sundsvalls CK	Per Carlsén	Per Noreen	Tommy Olin	Fredrik Hallström	
2020	Stocksund CK, Westmans					
2021	not held					
2022	Sundbybergs CK, Sumpan Seniors					
2023	Sundbybergs CK, Sumpan Seniors					
2024	Sundbybergs CK, Sumpan Seniors					
2025	Sundsvall Curling	Per Carlsén	Dan-Ola Eriksson	Rickard Hallström	Fredrik Hallström	Tommy Olin, Niklas Berggren
2026	Sundbybergs CK	Fredrik Julius	Josep Puigdemont	Martin Vallée	Hasse Norrman	Johan Bergman

=== Women (Oldgirls) ===
Year	Champion team (City, curling club)	Skip	Third	Second	Lead	Alternate Coach
1972	Sundsvalls CK	Ann-Marie Bruneflod	Anna-Stina Ridderhiem	Ing-Marie Carlsson	Britta Edgren	
1973	Sollefteå CK	Gertrud Kamp	Christina Jeanson	Gun Olsson	Iris Nilsson	
1974	Stocksunds CK	Bojan Zachrisson	Inge-Lise Eklund	Margaretha Sylvén	Göta Danielsson	
1975	Norrköpings CK	Maire Eriksson	Gerd Jansson	Gunvor Björhäll	Karin Lindberg	
1976	Örebro DCK	Elisabeth Branäs	Brita Sandmark	Liv Granum	Majken Lundberg	
1977	CK Skvadern	Barbro Andréen	Birgit Melinder	Solveig Asp	Betty Pettersson	
1978	Sollefteå CK	Gertrud Kamp	Gun Olsson	Christina Jeanson	Iris Nilsson	
1979	Stocksunds CK	Bojan Zachrisson	Christina Regårdh	Inge-Lise Eklund	Margaretha Möller	
1980	CK Skvadern	Barbro Andréen	Birgit Melinder	Solveig Asp	Gullan Isaksson	
1981	CK Skvadern	Barbro Andréen	Birgit Melinder	Solveig Asp	Gullan Isaksson	
1982	CK Skvadern	Barbro Andréen	Birgit Melinder	Gullan Isaksson	Solveig Asp	
1985	Frösö-Oden CK	Ulla Möllervärn	Rut Ljungberg	Birgitta Eklund	Marianne Westin	
2004	Stocksunds CK	Ingrid Meldahl	Ann-Catrin Kjerr	Sylvia Malmberg Liljefors	Inger Berg	
2008	Stocksunds CK	Ingrid Meldahl	Ann-Catrin Kjerr	Sylvia Liljefors	Birgitta Törn	
2009	Härnösands CK	Vivan Eriksson	Anna-Greta Häggquist	Ingrid Nordin	Margareta Modig	Anita Saveby
2011	Stocksunds CK	Ingrid Meldahl	Ann-Catrin Kjerr	Birgitta Törn	Sylvia Liljefors	
2012	Stocksunds CK	Ingrid Meldahl	Ann-Catrin Kjerr	Birgitta Törn	Sylvia Liljefors	Mia Lehander
2013	Stocksunds CK	Ingrid Meldahl	Ann-Catrin Kjerr	Birgitta Törn	Sylvia Liljefors	Mia Lehander
2014	Stocksunds CK	Ingrid Meldahl	Ann-Catrin Kjerr	Birgitta Törn	Sylvia Liljefors	Mia Lehander
2015	Norrköpings CK	Gunilla Arfwidsson Edlund	Eva Olofsson	Karin Österberg	Haide Stensson	
2016	Norrköpings CK	Gunilla Arfwidsson Edlund	Eva Olofsson	Anta Hedström	Haide Stensson	Karin Österberg
2017	Karlstads CK	Marie Henriksson	Carina Björk	Birgitta Sewik	Helena Eriksson	
2018	Stocksunds CK	Anette Norberg	Anna Klange Wikström	Anna Rindeskog	Helena Lingham	
2019	Stocksunds CK	Anette Norberg	Helena Lingham	Helena Klange	Anna Klange	
2020	Malung CK, Mabergs					
2021	not held					
2022	Danderyds CK, Klange					
2023	CK Granit, Noreen					
2024	Härnösands CK, Norberg					
2025	CK Granit	Camilla Noréen	Susanne Patz	Helene Lyxell	Catrin Bitén	
2026	Svegs CK	Anette Norberg	Cathrine Lindahl	Ulrika Bergman	Anna Le Moine	Ecko Bergman

== See also ==
- Swedish Men's Curling Championship
- Swedish Women's Curling Championship
- Swedish Mixed Curling Championship
- Swedish Mixed Doubles Curling Championship
- Swedish Junior Curling Championships
- Swedish Wheelchair Curling Championship
