= Sven Eklund =

Swedish curler (1916–1997)

Sven Axel Tankred Eklund
- Curler
- Born: 3 December 1916; Stockholm, Sweden
- Died: 6 June 1997 (aged 80); Lidingö, Sweden

Curling career
- Member Association: Sweden
- World Championship: 1 (1963)
Medal record
Curling
Swedish Men's Championship
| Gold medal – first place | 1952 |
| Gold medal – first place | 1954 |
| Gold medal – first place | 1955 |
| Gold medal – first place | 1959 |

Sven Axel Tankred Eklund (3 December 1916 – 6 June 1997) was a Swedish curler and sports executive. He was the alternate on the team that represented Sweden during the 1963 Scotch Cup, the World Men's Curling Championship at the time. He was also a former president of the World Curling Federation and is a WCF Hall of Fame inductee.

Eklund curled out of the Åredalens Curlingklubb in Åre, Sweden with teammates John-Allan Månsson, Curt Jonsson, Gustav Larsson, and Magnus Berge when he represented Sweden at the 1963 Scotch Cup. He later became the captain of the Swedish national curling team, and he also became president of the International Curling Association, now known as the World Curling Federation. He was also active in the curling club Fjällgårdens CK.

At the national level, he was a four-time Swedish men's champion curler (1952, 1954, 1955, 1959), played at third position.

In 1966 he was awarded with the Svenska Curlingförbundets Guldmedalj by the Swedish Curling Association. In 1966 he was inducted into the Swedish Curling Hall of Fame. In 1982 he was awarded with the Elmer Freytag Award from the World Curling Federation.

In 1968 Eklund produced the Swedish curling manual Curling.

== Teams ==
| Season | Skip | Third | Second | Lead | Alternate | Events |
|---|---|---|---|---|---|---|
| 1951–52 | Per Eric Nilsson | Sven Eklund | Lars Ryberg | Rolf Aleman | | SMCC 1952 (gold) |
| 1953–54 | Per Eric Nilsson | Sven Eklund | Bertel Skiöld | Bengt Öhrman | | SMCC 1954 (gold) |
| 1954–55 | Per Eric Nilsson | Sven Eklund | Lennart Söderström | Bengt Öhrman | | SMCC 1955 (gold) |
| 1958–59 | Per Eric Nilsson | Sven Eklund | Totte Åkerlund | Lars Ryberg | | SMCC 1959 (gold) |
| 1962–63 | Curt Jonsson (skip) | John-Allan Månsson (fourth) | Gustav Larsson | Magnus Berge | Sven A. Eklund | WMCC 1963 (4th) |

== Personal life ==
Eklund was the father of actress Britt Ekland.
