= Claes-Göran Carlman =

Swedish curler

- Curler
- Other names: Boa
- Born: 29 August 1943 (age 83)

Team
- Curling club: Djursholms CK, Stockholm

Curling career
- Member Association: Sweden
- World Championship: 4 (1970, 1972, 1973, 1978)
- European Championship: 2 (1975, 1982)
Medal record
Curling
World Championships
Gold medal – first place	1973 Regina
European Championships
Silver medal – second place	1975 Megève
Swedish Men's Championship
Gold medal – first place	1969
Gold medal – first place	1972
Gold medal – first place	1973
Gold medal – first place	1978

Boa Sven Claes-Göran Carlman (born 29 August 1943) is a Swedish curler.

He is a 1973 World Men's champion and a four-time Swedish men's curling champion (1969, 1972, 1973, 1978).

In 1973 he was inducted into the Swedish Curling Hall of Fame.

== Teams ==
Season	Skip	Third	Second	Lead	Events
1968–69	Kjell Oscarius	Bengt Oscarius	Boa Carlman	Christer Wessel	SMCC 1969 (gold); WCC 1969 (4th)
1971–72	Kjell Oscarius	Tom Schaeffer	Bengt Oscarius	Claes-Göran "Boa" Carlman	SMCC 1972 (gold); WCC 1972 (8th)
1972–73	Kjell Oscarius	Bengt Oscarius	Tom Schaeffer	Boa Carlman	SMCC 1973 (gold); WCC 1973 (gold)
1975–76	Kjell Oscarius	Bengt Oscarius	Tom Schaeffer	Claes-Göran "Boa" Carlman	ECC 1975 (silver)
1977–78	Tom Schaeffer	Svante Ödman	Fred Ridderstad	Claes-Göran Carlman	SMCC 1978 (gold); WCC 1978 (4th)
1982–83	Tom Schaeffer	Bengt Oscarius	Lars Hegert	Claes-Göran "Boa" Carlman	ECC 1982 (5th)
