= Oscarius =

Oscarius is a surname. Notable people with the surname include:

- Bengt Oscarius (born 1944), Swedish curler
- Kjell Oscarius (born 1943), Swedish curler
