= Thomas Håkansson =

Swedish and Canadian male curler

- Curler ♂
- Born: 19 October 1957 (age 69)

Team
- Curling club: IF Göta, Karlstad, Karlstads CK, Karlstad, Dartmouth CC, (Canada) Dartmouth, Nova Scotia

Curling career
- Member Association: Sweden; Nova Scotia (1984-present)
- Brier: 1985, 1988
- World Championship: 1 (1980)
- European Championship: 1 (1976)
- Other appearances: World Junior Championships: 1 (1978)
Medal record
Curling
European Championships
Bronze medal – third place	1976 West Berlin
Swedish Men's Championship
Gold medal – first place	1976
Gold medal – first place	1980
World Junior Championships
Silver medal – second place	1978 Grindelwald

Per Thomas Håkansson (born 19 October 1957) is a Swedish and Canadian curler, a 1976 European bronze medallist and two-time Swedish men's champion (1976, 1980).

His team won the 1976 Sweden men's championship, but it was decided that the team members were too young for the World Championship, so team Bengt Cederwall (skip) went to the 1976 Worlds instead.

He would later move to Canada, and played in the 1985 and 1988 Labatt Brier for Nova Scotia.

== Awards ==
- Ross Harstone Sportsmanship Award: 1988

== Teams ==
=== Sweden ===
Season	Skip	Third	Second	Lead	Events
1975–76	Jens Håkansson	Thomas Håkansson	Per Lindeman	Lars Lindgren	SMCC 1976 (gold)
1976–77	Jens Håkansson	Thomas Håkansson	Per Lindeman	Lars Lindgren	ECC 1976 (bronze)
1977–78	Thomas Håkansson	Per Lindeman	Lars Lindgren	Erik Björemo	SJCC 1978 (gold); WJCC 1978 (silver)
1979–80	Ragnar Kamp	Håkan Ståhlbro	Thomas Håkansson	Lars Lindgren	SMCC 1980 (gold); WMCC 1980 (4th)

=== Canada ===
Season	Skip	Third	Second	Lead	Alternate	Events
1984–85	Tom Hakansson	Peter MacPhee	Stuart MacLean	Dave Wallace	Bruce Walker	Brier 1985 (T7th)
1987–88	Thomas Hakansson	Stuart MacLean	Bill Robinson	Dave Wallace	Peter MacPhee	Brier 1988 (5th)

== Personal life ==
Håkansson is a member of a family of curlers. His father Stig is a 1968 Swedish men's champion, his brother Lars-Erik is a 1971 Swedish champion, and his nephew (Lars-Erik's son) Patric Håkansson (Klaremo) played for Sweden in the 2005 World Men's Championship.
