= Berglöf =

Berglöf is a Swedish surname. Notable people with the surname include:

- Erik Berglöf (born 1957), Swedish economist
- Erik Berglöf (curler) (born 1953), Swedish harness racer and curler
- Roy Berglöf (1924–2017), Swedish curler
