= Murray Melville =

Scottish curler

- Curler ♂

Team
- Curling club: St. Martins CC, Perth

Curling career
- Member Association: Scotland
- World Championship: 2 (1969, 1970)
Medal record
Curling
World Championship
Silver medal – second place	1970 Utica
Bronze medal – third place	1969 Perth
Scottish Men's Championship
Gold medal – first place	1970

Murray Melville is a Scottish curler.

At the 1969 World Men's Championship, called the Air Canada Silver Broom, Bill Muirhead brought Melville in to replace second Derek Scott, who had a migraine, for the semifinal against the United States. Scotland lost that game, settling for the bronze medal.

In 1970, Muirhead brought Melville on to his team full-time, replacing Alex Young at lead. The other two members of Muirhead's bronze medalist team, second Derek Scott and third George Haggart, stayed on in their respective positions. Melville and Team Muirhead won the Scottish men's champion that year, taking them back to the World Championship. At World's they won the silver medal when they lost to Don Duguid's Team Canada in the final with a score of 4–11.

In 1983, Melville played third for Alan Glen's team when they won the Perth Masters, a major bonspiel held annually in Perth, Scotland.

== Teams ==
Season	Skip	Third	Second	Lead	Alternate	Events
1968–69	Bill Muirhead	George Haggart	Derek Scott	Alex Young	Murray Melville (WMCC)	1969 WMCC (bronze)
1969–70	Bill Muirhead	George Haggart	Derek Scott	Murray Melville		1970 SMCC (gold); 1970 WMCC (silver)
1982–83	Alan Glen	Murray Melville	Scott Symon	Leonard Dudman		
