= Göran Åberg =

Swedish curler

- Curler ♂
- Born: 7 October 1956 (age 70)

Team
- Curling club: Karlstads CK, Karlstad

Curling career
- Member Association: Sweden
- European Championship: 2 (1985, 1989)
Medal record
Curling
European Championships
Silver medal – second place	1985 Grindelwald
Swedish Men's Championship
Gold medal – first place	1989

Karl Göran Åberg (born 7 October 1956) is a Swedish curler.

He is a 1985 European silver medallist and 1989 Swedish men's champion.

== Teams ==
Season	Skip	Third	Second	Lead	Events
1985–86	Connie Östlund (fourth)	Per Lindeman (skip)	Bo Andersson	Göran Åberg	ECC 1985 (silver)
1988–89	Per Lindeman	Lars Lindgren	Göran Åberg	Carl von Wendt	SMCC 1989 (gold)
1989–90	Per Lindeman	Bo Andersson	Göran Åberg	Carl von Wendt	ECC 1989 (5th)

== Personal life ==
His older brother Gunnar is also a curler. He won a silver medal at the 2008 World Senior Championships.
