= Axel Kamp =

Swedish curler (1921–2019)

- Curler ♂
- Born: 1 April 1921
- Died: 13 June 2019 (aged 98)

Team
- Curling club: Härnösands CK, Härnösand

Curling career
- Member Association: Sweden
- World Championship: 1 (1975)
Medal record
Curling
Swedish Men's Championship
Gold medal – first place	1975

Axel Kamp (1 April 1921 – 13 June 2019) was a Swedish curler.

He was a 1975 Swedish men's champion and a 1985 Swedish mixed champion.

In 1968 he was inducted into the Swedish Curling Hall of Fame.

== Teams ==
=== Men's ===
Season	Skip	Third	Second	Lead	Events
1974–75	Ragnar Kamp (fourth)	Björn Rudström	Christer Mårtensson	Axel Kamp (skip)	SMCC 1975 (gold); WCC 1975 (4th)
1976–77	Åke Nilsson	Axel Kamp	Sven Jeansson	Curt Hasselborg	SSCC 1977 (gold)
1977–78	Åke Nilsson	Axel Kamp	Sven Jeansson	Curt Hasselborg	SSCC 1978 (gold)
1978–79	Åke Nilsson	Axel Kamp	Sven Jeansson	Curt Hasselborg	SSCC 1979 (gold)

=== Mixed ===
Season	Skip	Third	Second	Lead	Events
1985	Axel Kamp	Gertrud Kamp	Göran Roxin	Marie Henriksson	SMxCC 1985 (gold)

== Personal life ==
His son Ragnar Kamp is a curler too, 1977 World Men's champion. Axel and Ragnar played together on the 1975 World Men's championship.
