= Christer Wessel =

Swedish male curler

- Curler
- Born: 15 May 1943 (age 83)

Team
- Curling club: Djursholms CK, Stockholm

Curling career
- Member Association: Sweden
- World Championship: 1 (1969)
Medal record
Curling
Swedish Men's Championship
Gold medal – first place	1969

Jonas Christer Wessel (born 15 May 1943) is a Swedish curler.

He is a 1969 Swedish men's curling champion and a 1968 Swedish mixed curling champion.

== Teams ==
=== Men's ===
Season	Skip	Third	Second	Lead	Events
1968–69	Kjell Oscarius	Bengt Oscarius	Claes-Göran "Boa" Carlman	Christer Wessel	SMCC 1969 (gold); WCC 1969 (4th)

=== Mixed ===
Season	Skip	Third	Second	Lead	Events
1968	Christer Wessel	Britta Nerell	Kjell Oscarius	Britta Oscarius	SMxCC 1968 (gold)
