= Tom Schaeffer =

Swedish curler (1940–2020)

- Curler ♂
- Born: 15 November 1940
- Died: 3 December 2020 (aged 80)

Team
- Curling club: Stallmästaregårdens CK, Stockholm, Djursholms CK, Stockholm

Curling career
- Member Association: Sweden
- World Championship: 4 (1970, 1972, 1973, 1978)
- European Championship: 2 (1975, 1982)
Medal record
Curling
World Championships
Gold medal – first place	1973 Regina
Bronze medal – third place	1970 Utica
European Championships
Silver medal – second place	1975 Megève
Swedish Men's Championship
Gold medal – first place	1970
Gold medal – first place	1972
Gold medal – first place	1973
Gold medal – first place	1978

Tom Peter Schaeffer (15 November 1940 – 3 December 2020) was a Swedish curler.

He was a 1973 World Men's champion, 1970 World Men's bronze medallist and a four-time Swedish men's curling champion (1970, 1972, 1973, 1978).

In 1973, he was inducted into the Swedish Curling Hall of Fame.

== Teams ==
Season	Skip	Third	Second	Lead	Events
1969–70	Claes Källén (fourth)	Christer Källén	Sture Lindén	Tom Schaeffer (skip)	SMCC 1970 (gold); WCC 1970 (bronze)
1971–72	Kjell Oscarius	Tom Schaeffer	Bengt Oscarius	Claes-Göran "Boa" Carlman	SMCC 1972 (gold); WCC 1972 (8th)
1972–73	Kjell Oscarius	Bengt Oscarius	Tom Schaeffer	Boa Carlman	SMCC 1973 (gold); WCC 1973 (gold)
1975–76	Kjell Oscarius	Bengt Oscarius	Tom Schaeffer	Claes-Göran "Boa" Carlman	ECC 1975 (silver)
1977–78	Tom Schaeffer	Svante Ödman	Fred Ridderstad	Claes-Göran Carlman	SMCC 1978 (gold); WCC 1978 (4th)
1982–83	Tom Schaeffer	Bengt Oscarius	Lars Hegert	Claes-Göran "Boa" Carlman	ECC 1982 (5th)
1988–89	Tom Schaeffer	Svante Ödman	Stig Johnson	Sven Fryksenius	SSCC 1989 (gold)
