= Rydgren =

Rydgren is a surname. Notable people with the surname include:

- Jens Rydgren (born 1969), Swedish writer, political commentator and sociologist
- Per Ivar Rydgren (born 1927), Swedish curler
