= Roy Berglöf =

Swedish male curler and bandy player (1924–2017)

- Curler ♂
- Born: April 24, 1926
- Died: July 27, 2017 (aged 91); Karlstad

Team
- Curling club: IF Göta, Karlstad, Karlstads CK, Karlstad

Curling career
- Member Association: Sweden
- World Championship: 2 (1968, 1971)
Medal record
Curling
Swedish Men's Championship
Gold medal – first place	1968
Gold medal – first place	1971

Roy Holger Berglöf (April 24, 1924 – July 27, 2017) was a Swedish curler.

He was a two-time Swedish men's curling champion (1968, 1971) and played for Sweden in two World championships. He was also a 1970 Swedish mixed curling champion.

In 1972 he was inducted into the Swedish Curling Hall of Fame.

He was also a bandy player, winning a bronze medal at the 1957 Bandy World Championship.

== Teams ==
=== Men's ===
Season	Skip	Third	Second	Lead	Alternate	Events
1967–68	Roy Berglöf (fourth)	Kjell Grengmark (skip)	Sven Carlsson	Stig Håkansson		SMCC 1968 (gold); WCC 1968 (4th)
1970–71	Roy Berglöf (fourth)	Kjell Grengmark (skip)	Erik Berglöf	Lars-Erik Håkansson		SMCC 1971 (gold); WCC 1971 (5th)
1979–80	Rune Forsberg	Kjell Grengmark	Roy Berglöf	Uno Jansson		SSCC 1980 (gold)
1983–84	Lennart Hemmingson	Roy Berglöf	Stig Håkansson	Sven Gustafson		SSCC 1984 (gold)
1987–88	Lennart Hemmingson	Stig Håkansson	Sven Gustafson	Roy Berglöf	Kjell Grengmark	SSCC 1988 (gold)
1989–90	Lennart Hemmingson	Roy Berglöf	Stig Håkansson	Kjell Grengmark		SSCC 1990 (gold)
1991–92	Roy Berglöf	Kjell Grengmark	Stig Håkansson	Sven Gustavsson		SSCC 1992 (gold)

=== Mixed ===
Season	Skip	Third	Second	Lead	Events
1970	Lennart Hemmingson	Maggie Berglöf	Roy Berglöf	Ingegerd Hemmingson	SMxCC 1970 (gold)

== Personal life ==
His son Erik Berglöf is a curler too, Roy and Erik played together for Sweden at the 1971 World men's championship.
