= Sven Carlsson =

Swedish male curler

- Curler ♂
- Born: May 5, 1915; Lidköping
- Died: 1995 (aged 79–80)

Team
- Curling club: IF Göta, Karlstad, Karlstads CK, Karlstad

Curling career
- Member Association: Sweden
- World Championship: 1 (1968)
Medal record
Curling
Swedish Men's Championship
Gold medal – first place	1968

Sven Carlsson (May 5, 1915 – 1995) was a Swedish curler.

He was a 1968 Swedish men's curling champion and played for Sweden at the 1968 World Men's championship.

== Teams ==
Season	Skip	Third	Second	Lead	Events
1967–68	Roy Berglöf (fourth)	Kjell Grengmark (skip)	Sven Carlsson	Stig Håkansson	SMCC 1968 (gold); WCC 1968 (4th)

== Personal life ==
His daughter Elisabeth Högström (née Carlsson) is a well-known Swedish women curler, world champion and five times European champion.
