= Lars Lindgren (curler) =

Swedish and Canadian curler (born 1957)

- Curler ♂
- Born: 10 November 1957 (age 69)

Team
- Curling club: IF Göta, Karlstad, Karlstads CK, Karlstad

Curling career
- Member Association: Sweden
- World Championship: 1 (1980)
- European Championship: 2 (1976, 1989)
- Other appearances: World Junior Championships: 1 (1978), World Senior Championships: 1 (2012)
Medal record
Curling
European Championships
Bronze medal – third place	1976 West Berlin
Swedish Men's Championship
Gold medal – first place	1976
Gold medal – first place	1980
Gold medal – first place	1989
World Junior Championships
Silver medal – second place	1978 Grindelwald

Lars Erik Lindgren (born 10 November 1957) is a Swedish curler, a 1976 European bronze medallist and three-time Swedish men's champion (1976, 1980, 1989).

His team won the 1976 Sweden men's championship, but it was decided that the team members were too young for the World Championship, so team Bengt Cederwall (skip) went to the 1976 Worlds instead.

== Teams ==
Season	Skip	Third	Second	Lead	Alternate	Events
1975–76	Jens Håkansson	Thomas Håkansson	Per Lindeman	Lars Lindgren		SMCC 1976 (gold)
1976–77	Jens Håkansson	Thomas Håkansson	Per Lindeman	Lars Lindgren		ECC 1976 (bronze)
1977–78	Thomas Håkansson	Per Lindeman	Lars Lindgren	Erik Björemo		SJCC 1978 (gold); WJCC 1978 (silver)
1979–80	Ragnar Kamp	Håkan Ståhlbro	Thomas Håkansson	Lars Lindgren		SMCC 1980 (gold); WMCC 1980 (4th)
1988–89	Per Lindeman	Lars Lindgren	Göran Åberg	Carl von Wendt		SMCC 1989 (gold)
2011–12	Connie Östlund	Morgan Fredholm	Lars Lindgren	Glenn Franzén	Stig Sewik	SSCC 2012 (gold); WSCC 2012 (bronze)
2013–14	Connie Östlund	Morgan Fredholm	Lars Lindgren	Glenn Franzén	Lennart Carlsson	SSCC 2014 (gold); WSCC 2014 (silver)
2015–16	Connie Östlund	Morgan Fredholm	Lars Lindgren	Glenn Franzén		SSCC 2016 (13th)
2015–16	Mats Wranå	Mikael Hasselborg	Anders Eriksson	Gerry Wahlin	Lars Lindgren	WSCC 2016 (gold)
