= Håkan Ståhlbro =

Swedish male curler

- Curler ♂
- Born: 11 February 1957 (age 69)

Team
- Curling club: Karlstads CK, Karlstad

Curling career
- Member Association: Sweden
- World Championship: 1 (1980)
Medal record
Curling
Swedish Men's Championship
Gold medal – first place	1980

Håkan Ståhlbro (born 11 February 1957) is a Swedish curler.

He is a 1980 Swedish men's champion and a 1982 Swedish mixed champion.

== Teams ==
=== Men's ===
Season	Skip	Third	Second	Lead	Events
1979–80	Ragnar Kamp	Håkan Ståhlbro	Thomas Håkansson	Lars Lindgren	SMCC 1980 (gold); WMCC 1980 (4th)

=== Mixed ===
Season	Skip	Third	Second	Lead	Events
1982	Pelle Lindeman	Katarina Hultling	Håkan Ståhlbro	Birgitta Sewik	SMxCC 1982 (gold)
