= Lars-Erik Håkansson =

Swedish male curler

- Curler ♂
- Other names: Peppe
- Born: 1 May 1950 (age 76)

Team
- Curling club: IF Göta, Karlstad

Curling career
- Member Association: Sweden
- World Championship: 1 (1971)
Medal record
Curling
Swedish Men's Championship
Gold medal – first place	1971

Lars-Erik "Peppe" Håkansson (born 1 May 1950) is a Swedish curler.

He is a 1971 Swedish men's curling champion.

== Teams ==
Season	Skip	Third	Second	Lead	Events
1970–71	Roy Berglöf (fourth)	Kjell Grengmark (skip)	Erik Berglöf	Lars-Erik Håkansson	SMCC 1971 (gold); WCC 1971 (5th)

== Personal life ==
Lars-Erik is a member of family of curlers: his father Stig Håkansson is a 1968 Swedish men's champion, his brother Thomas Håkansson is a 1976 European bronze medallist and two-time Swedish champion, his son Patric Håkansson (Patric Klaremo) played for Sweden in the 2005 World Men's Championship.
