= 1969 Air Canada Silver Broom =

- Host city: Perth, Scotland
- Arena: Perth Ice Rink
- Dates: March 18–22, 1969
- Winner: Canada
- Curling club: Calgary CC, Calgary
- Skip: Ron Northcott
- Third: Dave Gerlach
- Second: Bernie Sparkes
- Lead: Fred Storey
- Finalist: United States

The 1969 Air Canada Silver Broom, the men's world curling championship, was held at the Perth Ice Rink in Perth, Scotland.

== Teams ==
Canada	France	Germany	Norway
Calgary CC, Calgary Skip: Ron Northcott; Third: Dave Gerlach; Second: Bernie Sparkes; Lead: Fred Storey	Mont d'Arbois CC, Megève Skip: Pierre Boan; Third: André Mabboux; Second: Yves Vallet; Lead: Richard Duvillard	EC Bad Tölz, Bad Tölz Skip: Werner Fischer-Weppler; Third: Herbert Kellner; Second: Rolf Klug; Lead: Heinz Kellner	Bygdøy CC, Oslo Skip: Erik Gylenhammar; Third: Sverre Michelsen; Second: Nils Anton Riise-Hanssen; Lead: Kai Dyvik
Scotland	Sweden	Switzerland	United States
St. Martins CC, Perth Skip: Bill Muirhead; Third: George Haggart; Second: Derek Scott; Lead: Alec Young	Djursholms CK, Stockholm Skip: Kjell Oscarius; Third: Bengt Oscarius; Second: Boa Carlman; Lead: Christer Wessel	Bern-Zähringer CC, Bern Skip: Heinz Beutler; Third: Mario Bettosini; Second: Jean-Pierre Mühlemann; Lead: Kurt Schneider	Superior CC, Superior Skip: Bud Somerville; Third: Bill Strum; Second: Franklin Bradshaw; Lead: Gene Ovesen

== Standings ==
Country	Skip	W	L
Canada	Ron Northcott	6	1
Scotland	Bill Muirhead	5	2
United States	Bud Somerville	5	2
Sweden	Kjell Oscarius	4	3
Switzerland	Heinz Beutler	3	4
Germany	Werner Fischer-Weppler	2	5
France	Pierre Boan	2	5
Norway	Erik Gylenhammar	1	6

== Results ==
=== Draw 1 ===
Team	Final
Germany (Fischer-Weppler)	14
France (Boan)	11

Team	Final
Switzerland (Beutler)	11
Norway (Gylenhammar)	5

Team	Final
Canada (Northcott)	11
Sweden (Oscarius)	6

Team	Final
Scotland (Muirhead)	11
United States (Somerville)	4

=== Draw 2 ===
Team	Final
Scotland (Muirhead)	14
France (Boan)	8

Team	Final
Canada (Northcott)	22
Germany (Fischer-Weppler)	5

Team	Final
United States (Somerville)	13
Norway (Gylenhammar)	6

Team	Final
Switzerland (Beutler)	10
Sweden (Oscarius)	8

=== Draw 3 ===
Team	Final
France (Boan)	9
Sweden (Oscarius)	8

Team	Final
United States (Somerville)	21
Germany (Fischer-Weppler)	1

Team	Final
Scotland (Muirhead)	12
Switzerland (Beutler)	5

Team	Final
Canada (Northcott)	28
Norway (Gylenhammar)	2

=== Draw 4 ===
Team	Final
Scotland (Muirhead)	14
Germany (Fischer-Weppler)	5

Team	Final
Sweden (Oscarius)	11
Norway (Gylenhammar)	2

Team	Final
Canada (Northcott)	9
Switzerland (Beutler)	6

Team	Final
United States (Somerville)	12
France (Boan)	3

=== Draw 5 ===
Team	Final
United States (Somerville)	12
Canada (Northcott)	10

Team	Final
Germany (Fischer-Weppler)	11
Switzerland (Beutler)	7

Team	Final
Sweden (Oscarius)	10
Scotland (Muirhead)	7

Team	Final
France (Boan)	14
Norway (Gylenhammar)	7

=== Draw 6 ===
Team	Final
Canada (Northcott)	9
France (Boan)	4

Team	Final
Sweden (Oscarius)	12
Germany (Fischer-Weppler)	3

Team	Final
Scotland (Muirhead)	15
Norway (Gylenhammar)	4

Team	Final
United States (Somerville)	15
Switzerland (Beutler)	3

=== Draw 7 ===
Team	Final
Norway (Gylenhammar)	13
Germany (Fischer-Weppler)	11

Team	Final
Sweden (Oscarius)	9
United States (Somerville)	8

Team	Final
Canada (Northcott)	9
Scotland (Muirhead)	8

Team	Final
Switzerland (Beutler)	7
France (Boan)	5

== Playoffs ==
Semi-Final			Final
			1	Canada	9
3	United States	7	3	United States	6
2	Scotland	5

=== Semifinal ===
Team	Final
United States (Somerville)	7
Scotland (Muirhead)	5

=== Final ===
Team	Final
Canada (Northcott)	9
United States (Somerville)	6

1969 Air Canada Silver Broom
(Canada)
Canada
9th title
