= Franklin Bradshaw (curler) =

American curler

- Curler ♂
- Other names: Corky

Team
- Curling club: Superior CC, Superior, Wisconsin

Curling career
- Member Association: United States
- World Championship: 1 (1969)
Medal record
Curling
World Championships
Silver medal – second place	1969 Perth
United States Men's Championship
Gold medal – first place	1969 Grand Forks

Franklin "Corky" Bradshaw is an American curler.

He is a 1969 World Men's silver medallist and a 1969 United States men's curling champion.

== Teams ==
Season	Skip	Third	Second	Lead	Events
1968–69	Bud Somerville	Bill Strum	Franklin Bradshaw	Gene Ovesen	1969 USMCC (gold); 1969 WMCC (silver)
