= Walter Hubchick =

American curler

- Curler

Team
- Curling club: Detroit CC, Detroit
- Skip: Mike Slyziuk
- Third: Nelson Brown
- Second: Ernie Slyziuk
- Lead: Walter Hubchick

Curling career
- World Championship: 1 (1963)
Medal record
Representing United States
Men's curling
World Championships
Bronze medal – third place	1963 Scotch Cup	Team

Walter Hubchick is a Canadian-American curler. He was the lead on the team that represented the United States at the 1963 Scotch Cup, the men's world curling championship at the time. He and the team of skip Mike Slyziuk, third Nelson Brown, and second Ernie Slyziuk curled out of the Detroit Curling Club from Detroit, Michigan. Hubchick and the US team finished in third place, receiving the bronze medal.

He was originally from Grandview, Manitoba.
