= Lars Dracke =

Swedish male curler

- Curler ♂
- Born: 21 March 1925; Stockholm
- Died: 12 September 2000 (aged 75); Stockholm

Team
- Curling club: AIK CK, Stockholm

Curling career
- Member Association: Sweden
- World Championship: 1 (1966)
Medal record
Curling
Swedish Men's Championship
| Gold medal – first place | 1966 |

Lars Ernst Johannes Dracke (21 March 1925 – 12 September 2000) was a Swedish curler.

He was a 1966 Swedish men's curling champion.

He was employed as a dentist.

== Teams ==
| Season | Skip | Third | Second | Lead | Events |
|---|---|---|---|---|---|
| 1965–66 | Lars Dracke | Olle Gewalt | Ove Ingels | Sven Fryksenius | SMCC 1966 (gold); WCC 1966 (4th) |
