= Mike O'Leary =

American curler

- Curler ♂

Team
- Curling club: Fargo CC, Fargo, North Dakota

Curling career
- Member Association: United States
- World Championship: 1 (1966)
Medal record
Curling
World Championships
| Bronze medal – third place | 1966 Vancouver |
United States Men's Championship
| Gold medal – first place | 1966 Hibbing |

Mike O'Leary is an American curler.

He is a 1966 World Men's bronze medallist and a 1966 United States men's curling champion.

== Teams ==
| Season | Skip | Third | Second | Lead | Events |
|---|---|---|---|---|---|
| 1965–66 | Bruce Roberts | Joe Zbacnik | Gerry Toutant | Mike O'Leary | USMCC 1966 (gold); WCC 1966 (bronze) |
