= Ove Ingels =

Swedish curler (1926–1977)

- Curler ♂
- Born: 16 February 1926
- Died: 1977 (aged 50–51)

Team
- Curling club: AIK CK, Stockholm

Curling career
- Member Association: Sweden
- World Championship: 1 (1966)
Medal record
Curling
Swedish Men's Championship
Gold medal – first place	1966

Ove Ingels (16 February 1926 – 1977) was a Swedish curler.

He was a 1966 Swedish men's curling champion.

In 1967 he was inducted into the Swedish Curling Hall of Fame.

He was employed as a dentist.

== Teams ==
Season	Skip	Third	Second	Lead	Events
1965–66	Lars Dracke	Olle Gewalt	Ove Ingels	Sven Fryksenius	SMCC 1966 (gold); WCC 1966 (4th)
