= Swedish Curling Hall of Fame =

National curling championship

Swedish Curling Hall of Fame (Swedish: Stora Curlare) was created in 1966 by the Swedish Curling Association (Swedish: Svenska Curlingförbundet). A number of former and currently played curlers are inducted every year.

== Members ==
#	Curler	Curling club	Year/Season
1	Magnus Berge	Åredalens CK	1966
2	Ture Berggren	Linköpings CK	1966
3	Bengt Carlquist	Amatörföreningens CK	1966
4	Sven A. Eklund	Fjällgårdens CK, Sthlm	1966
5	Curt Jonsson	Åredalens CK	1966
6	Gustav Larsson	Åredalens CK	1966
7	John-Allan Månsson	Åredalens CK	1966
8	Per Eric "Pära" Nilsson	Fjällgårdens CK	1966
9	Tore Rydman	Örebro CK	1966
10	Totte Åkerlund	Fjällgårdens CK	1966
11	Bengt af Kleen	Fjällgårdens CK	1967
12	Ove Ingels	AIK, Sthlm	1967
13	Axel Kamp	Sollefteå CK	1968
14	Gun Ohlsson	Sollefteå CK	1968
15	Karl-Erik "Ecke" Bruneflod	Sundsvalls CK	1969–1970
16	Gertrud Kamp	Sollefteå CK	1969–1970
17	Rolf Arfwidsson	Norrköpings CK	1970–1971
18	Claes Källén	Stallmästaregårdens CK	1970–1971
19	Gösta "Jac" Jacobsson	AIK, Mariebergs CK	1970–1971
20	Ann-Marie Bruneflod	Sundsvall CK	1970–1971
21	Roy Berglöf	IF Göta, Karlstad	1971–1972
22	Kjell Grengmark	IF Göta, Karlstad	1971–1972
23	Lennart Hemmingson	Karlstads CK	1971–1972
24	Christina Jeanson	Sollefteå CK	1972–1973
25	Greta Perning	CK Pinglan	1972–1973
26	Christer Källén	Stallmästaregårdens CK	1972–1973
27	Elisabeth Högström	Karlstads CK	1972–1973
28	Elisabeth Klärre	CK Pinglan	1972–1973
29	Tom Schaeffer	Stallmästaregårdens CK, Djursholms CK	1972–1973
30	Kjell Oscarius	Djursholms CK	1972–1973
31	Bengt Oscarius	Djursholms CK	1972–1973
32	Claes-Göran "Boa" Carlman	Djursholms CK	1972–1973
33	Per Ödlund	Amatörföreningens CK	1973–1974
34	Knut Göran Bartels	Norrköpings CK	1973–1974
35	Svante Ödman	Djursholms CK	1975–1976
36	Jan Owe-Larsson	Karlstads CK, Amatörföreningens CK	1976–1977
37	Elisabeth Branäs	Örebro DCK	1976–1977
38	Eva Rosenhed	Örebro DCK	1976–1977
39	Maud Nordlander	Sundsvalls CK	1976–1977
40	Anne-Marie Ericsson	Örebro DCK	1977–1978
41	Ragnar Kamp	Sollefteå CK, Härnösands CK	1977–1978
42	Iris Nilsson	Sollefteå CK	1977–1978
43	Anders Thidholm	Härnösands CK	1977–1978
44	Barbro Andreen	CK Skvadern, Sundsvall	1977–1978
45	Gunvor Björhäll	Norrköpings CK	1977–1978
46	Björn Rudström	Härnösands CK	1977–1978
47	Barbro Arfwidsson	Norrköpings CK	1977–1978
48	Fredrik Lundberg	Amatörföreningens CK, Norrköpings CK	1978–1979
49	Inga Arfwidsson	Norrköpings CK	1978–1979
50	Bertil Timan	Härnösands CK	1978–1979
51	Håkan Rudström	Härnösands CK, Magnus Ladulås CK	1979–1980
52	Birgitta Törn	Stocksunds CK, Amatörföreningens CK	1979–1980
53	Jan Ullsten	Sundsvalls CK, Härnösands CK	1979–1980
54	Åke Nilsson	Sollefteå CK	1980–1981
55	Hans "Hatto" Söderström	Härnösands CK	1980–1981
56	Birgitta Sewik	Karlstads CK	1981–1982
57	Gunilla Bergman	CK Dockan, Stocksunds CK	1981–1982
58	Christer Mårtenson	Härnösands CK, Magnus Ladulås CK	1981–1982
59	Birgit Melinder	CK Skvadern	1981–1982
60	Karin Sjögren	Karlstads CK	1981–1982
61	Katarina Hultling	Stocksunds CK, Amatörföreningens CK, Karlstads CK	1981–1982
62	Anders "Ante" Nilsson	Härnösands CK	1981–1982
63	Ulrika Åkerberg	CK Ena, Enköping, Norrköpings CK	1982–1983
64	Stig Håkansson	IF Göta, Karlstads CK	1985–1986
65	Bo Möller	Stocksunds CK	1986–1987
66	Göran Roxin	CK Ena	1987–1988
67	Claes Roxin	CK Ena	1987–1988
68	Ingrid Meldahl	Stocksunds CK	1987–1988
69	Marie Henriksson	Karlstads CK	1987–1988
70	Ann-Catrin Kjerr	CK Dockan, Stocksunds CK	1987–1988
71	Per Lindeman	IF Göta, Karlstads CK	1988–1989
72	Anette Norberg	Härnösands CK	1988–1989
73	Anna Rindeskog	Härnösands CK	1988–1989
74	Sofie Marmont	Härnösands CK	1988–1989
75	Louise Marmont	Härnösands CK	1988–1989
76	Ewa Linderholm	Växjö CC, Norrköpings CK	1989–1990
77	Stefan Hasselborg	Sollefteå CK	1989–1990
78	Mikael Hasselborg	Sollefteå CK	1989–1990
79	Hans Nordin	Sollefteå CK	1989–1990
80	Stig Johnson	Djursholms CK	1991–1992
81	Elisabeth Persson	Umeå CK	1992–1993
82	Katarina Nyberg	Umeå CK	1992–1993
83	Elisabet Gustafson	Umeå CK	1992–1993
84	Jan-Olov Nässén	Frösö-Oden CK, Östersunds CK	1994–1995
85	Lars Vågberg	Sollefteå CK	1994–1995
86	Thomas Norgren	CK Skvadern, Karlstads CK, Timrå CK, Frösö-Oden CK, Sundsvalls CK	1994–1995
87	Helena Klange	Djursholms CK, Karlstads CK, Stocksunds CK, Härnösands CK, Östersunds CK	1995–1996
88	Jan Strandlund	Sundsvalls CK, Timrå CK, Falu CC, Örnskölsviks CK	1995–1996
89	Sven Fryksenius	AIK, Magnus Ladulås CK	1996–1997
90	Cathrine Lindahl	Härnösands CK	1996–1997
91	Lars-Åke Nordström	Örnsköldsviks CK, Sollefteå CK	1997–1998
92	Helena Lingham	Falu CC, Umeå CK, Frösö-Oden CK, Östersunds CK, Härnösands CK	1997–1998
93	Peja Lindholm	Östersunds CK	1997–1998
94	Peter Narup	Östersunds CK	1997–1998
95	Magnus Swartling	Östersunds CK	1997–1998
96	Tomas Nordin	Härnösands CK, Östersunds CK	1997–1998
97	Per Carlsén	Sundsvalls CK	2000–2001
98	Tommy Olin	Sundsvalls CK	2001–2002
99	Anders Lööf	Frösö-Oden CK, Östersunds CK, Järpens CK	2001–2002
100	Eva Lund	Runstenen-Väsby CG, Stocksunds CK, Härnösands CK	2002–2003
101	Mikael Ljungberg	Frösö-Oden CK, Östersunds CK, Järpens CK	2002–2003
102	Mikael Norberg	Sundsvalls CK	2002–2003
103	Anna Le Moine	Svegs CK, Härnösands CK	2003–2004
104	Sylvia Malmberg Liljefors	Stocksunds CK	2004–2005
105	Ulrika Bergman	Svegs CK	2004–2005
106	Margaretha Dryburgh	Svegs CK	2005–2006
107	Per Noreen	CK Granit-Gävle, Örnsköldsviks CK	2005–2006
108	Camilla Johansson	Malungs CC, CK Granit-Gävle	2005–2006
109	Fredrik Hallström	Östersunds CK, Sundsvalls CK, Härnösands CK	2007–2008
110	Rickard Hallström	Östersunds CK, Sundsvalls CK, Härnösands CK	2007–2008
111	Margaretha Sigfridsson	Svegs CK, Skellefteå CK	2008–2009
112	Maria Prytz	Svegs CK, Skellefteå CK	2008–2009
113	Marie Persson	Sundbybergs CK, Magnus Ladulås CK	2008–2009
114	Christina Bertrup	Umeå CK, CK Granit-Gävle, Skellefteå CK	2008–2009
115	Niklas Edin	Örnsköldsviks CK, Sundbybergs CK, Karlstads CK	2008–2009
116	Stina Viktorsson	Skellefteå CK	2008–2009
117	Maria Wennerström	Skellefteå CK	2010–2011
118	Sebastian Kraupp	Sundbybergs CK, Karlstads CK	2010–2011
119	Fredrik Lindberg	Örnsköldsviks CK, Karlstads CK	2010–2011
120	Viktor Kjäll	Östersunds CK, Karlstads CK	2010–2011
121	Oskar Eriksson	Karlstads CK, Lits CC	2011–2012
122	Anders Kraupp	Sundbybergs CK, Stocksund CK	2012–2013
123	Elisabeth Norredahl	Östersunds CK	2012–2013
124	Kristian Lindström	Lits CC	2013–2014
125	Andreas Prytz	Härnösands CK	2014–2015
126	Connie Östlund	Karlstads CK	2014–2015
127	Agnes Knochenhauer	Sundbybergs CK	2015–2016
128	Mats Wranå	Sundbybergs CK	2016–2017
129	Anders Eriksson	Norrköping CK	2016–2017
130	Sara Carlsson	Karlstads CK	2016–2017
131	Carina Björk	Brann Upp	2017–2018
132	Isabella Wranå	Sundbybergs CK	2017–2018
133	Jennie Wåhlin	Sundbybergs CK	2017–2018
134	Rasmus Wranå	Sundbybergs CK	2017–2018
135	Johanna Heldin	IK Fyris	2017–2018
136	Carina Björk	Karlstad CK	2017–2018
137	Christoffer Sundgren	Karlstad CK	2019–2020
138	Lars-Eric Roxin	IK Fyris	2021–2022

Members of Swedish Curling Hall of Fame denoted in men's and women's lists of Swedish curlers with "SG: + number + year/season" (for example for Claes Källén "SG: nr 18 1970-71").
