= Joe Zbacnik =

American curler (1937–2020)

- Curler ♂
- Born: 11 July 1937; St. Louis, Minnesota, U.S.
- Died: February 12, 2020; California, U.S.

Team
- Curling club: Fargo CC, Fargo, North Dakota

Curling career
- Member Association: United States
- World Championship: 1 (1966)
Medal record
Curling
World Championships
Bronze medal – third place	1966 Vancouver
United States Men's Championship
Gold medal – first place	1966 Hibbing

Joseph L. Zbacnik (July 11, 1937 – February 12, 2020) was an American curler.

He won a bronze medal at the 1966 World Championships and won the 1966 United States men's curling championship.

Zbacnik worked as a dentist, and employed the three members of his team at his clinic. He practiced dentistry in Moorhead, Minnesota and Dana Point, California. He was married to Kathleen and had three children.

== Teams ==
Season	Skip	Third	Second	Lead	Events
1965–66	Bruce Roberts	Joe Zbacnik	Gerry Toutant	Mike O'Leary	USMCC 1966 (gold); WCC 1966 (bronze)
