= Bo Andersson (curler) =

Swedish male curler (born 1956)

- Curler ♂
- Born: 21 September 1956 (age 70)

Team
- Curling club: Karlstads CK, Karlstad

Curling career
- Member Association: Sweden
- World Championship: 1 (1984)
- European Championship: 2 (1985, 1989)
- Other appearances: World Senior Championships: 1 (2008)
Medal record
Curling
World Championships
Bronze medal – third place	1984 Duluth
European Championships
Silver medal – second place	1985 Grindelwald
Swedish Men's Championship
Gold medal – first place	1985
World Senior Championships
Silver medal – second place	2008 Vierumäki

Bo Lennart Andersson (born 21 September 1956) is a Swedish curler.

He is a 1984 World bronze medallist and 1985 European silver medallist.

== Teams ==
Season	Skip	Third	Second	Lead	Events
1983–84	Connie Östlund (fourth)	Per Lindeman (skip)	Carl von Wendt	Bo Andersson	WCC 1984 (bronze)
1984–85	Connie Östlund (fourth)	Per Lindeman (skip)	Carl von Wendt	Bo Andersson	SMCC 1985 (gold)
1985–86	Connie Östlund (fourth)	Per Lindeman (skip)	Bo Andersson	Göran Åberg	ECC 1985 (silver)
1989–90	Per Lindeman	Bo Andersson	Göran Åberg	Carl von Wendt	ECC 1989 (5th)
2007–08	Per Lindeman	Bo Andersson	Carl von Wendt	Gunnar Åberg	WSCC 2008 (silver)
