= Sven Fryksenius =

Swedish male curler

- Curler ♂
- Born: 24 June 1930 (age 96)

Team
- Curling club: AIK CK, Stockholm, Magnus Ladulås CK

Curling career
- Member Association: Sweden
- World Championship: 1 (1966)
Medal record
Curling
Swedish Men's Championship
Gold medal – first place	1966

Sven Vilhelm Herman Fryksenius (born 24 June 1930) is a Swedish curler.

He is a 1966 Swedish men's curling champion.

In 1997 he was inducted into the Swedish Curling Hall of Fame.

He was employed as a dentist.

== Teams ==
Season	Skip	Third	Second	Lead	Events
1965–66	Lars Dracke	Olle Gewalt	Ove Ingels	Sven Fryksenius	SMCC 1966 (gold); WCC 1966 (4th)
1988–89	Tom Schaeffer	Svante Ödman	Stig Johnson	Sven Fryksenius	SSCC 1989 (gold)
1992–93	Stig Johnson	Bo Möller	Sven Fryksenius	Carl-Gustaf Regårdh	SSCC 1993 (gold)
