= Alain Bozon =

French ice hockey player and curler

- Born: 6 September 1939 (age 86) France
- Position: Forward
- Played for: France
- National team: France
- Playing career: 1957–1980

Alain Bozon (born 6 September 1939) is a French former professional ice hockey player and curler.

== Ice hockey career ==
Bozon captained the French national team in the 1960s and was inducted into the French Ice Hockey Hall of Fame in 2012.

== Curling career ==
Bozon also curled, he competed for France at the 1966 Scotch Cup, the World Men's Curling Championship, and at the 1970 World Men's Curling Championship. At the national level, he competed from Club de curling Mont d'Arbois (Megève).

=== Curling teams ===
Season	Skip	Third	Second	Lead	Events
1965–66	Jean Albert Sulpice	Alain Bozon	André Ducrey	Maurice Sulpice	WCC 1966 (7th)
1969–70	Pierre Boan	Jean Albert Sulpice	Alain Bozon	Maurice Sulpice	WCC 1970 (6th)

== Personal life ==
Bozon's son, Philippe, played professional ice hockey in the National Hockey League (NHL) for the St. Louis Blues; his grandchildren Tim and Kévin Bozon also played ice hockey; Tim was drafted by the Montreal Canadiens in the 2012 NHL entry draft.
