= 1966 Scotch Cup =

- Host city: Vancouver, British Columbia, Canada
- Arena: PNE Forum
- Dates: March 21–24, 1966
- Winner: Canada
- Curling club: Calgary CC, Calgary
- Skip: Ron Northcott
- Third: George Fink
- Second: Bernie Sparkes
- Lead: Fred Storey
- Finalist: Scotland

The 1966 Scotch Cup was the seventh edition of the Scotch Cup with the tournament heading back to Canada for the second time. It was held in Vancouver, Canada at the PNE Forum between March 21–24, 1966.

France debuted in this edition as the tournament expanded to seven teams. In the final it was Canada who reclaimed their title for the seventh time after defeating Scotland 12-5.

== Teams ==
Canada	France	Norway	Scotland
Calgary CC, Calgary Skip: Ron Northcott; Third: George Fink; Second: Bernie Sparkes; Lead: Fred Storey	Mont d'Arbois CC, Megève Skip: Jean Albert Sulpice; Third: Alain Bozon; Second: André Ducrey; Lead: Maurice Sulpice	Trondheim CC Skip: Nils Wiedemann; Third: Johann Lefstad; Second: Henrik Mollerjius; Lead: Rudolf Ingebrigtsen	Kilgraston & Moncrieffe CC, Perth Skip: Chuck Hay; Third: John Bryden; Second: Alan Glen; Lead: David Howie
Sweden	Switzerland	United States	
AIK CK, Stockholm Skip: Lars Dracke; Third: Olle Gewalt; Second: Ove Ingels; Lead: Sven Fryksenius	Rigi-Kaltbad CC Skip: Paul Kundert; Third: Alois Zimmerman; Second: Walter Eleganti; Lead: Wolf Lennartz	Fargo CC, North Dakota Skip: Bruce Roberts; Third: Joe Zbacnik; Second: Gerry Toutant; Lead: Mike O'Leary	

== Standings ==
Country	Skip	W	L
Canada	Ron Northcott	6	0
Scotland	Chuck Hay	4	2
United States	Bruce Roberts	4	2
Sweden	Lars Dracke	3	3
Switzerland	Paul Kundert	2	4
Norway	Nils Wiedemann	2	4
France	Jean Albert Sulpice	0	6

== Results ==
=== Draw 1 ===
Team	1	2	3	4	5	6	7	8	9	10	11	Final
Scotland (Hay)	0	1	0	0	3	2	0	0	2	0	0	8
United States (Roberts)	0	0	1	1	0	0	2	1	0	1	1	7

Team	1	2	3	4	5	6	7	8	9	10	11	12	Final
Canada (Northcott)	1	1	1	0	2	3	3	0	3	1	0	1	16
Sweden (Dracke)	0	0	0	2	0	0	0	1	0	0	1	0	4

Team	1	2	3	4	5	6	7	8	9	10	11	12	Final
Norway (Wiedemann)	0	2	0	1	2	1	0	2	3	0	0	1	12
France (Sulpice)	1	0	3	0	0	0	1	0	0	2	1	0	8

=== Draw 2 ===
Team	1	2	3	4	5	6	7	8	9	10	11	12	Final
Sweden (Dracke)	0	0	2	0	2	2	2	0	2	2	0	2	14
Norway (Wiedemann)	2	1	0	2	0	0	0	1	0	0	1	0	7

Team	1	2	3	4	5	6	7	8	9	10	11	12	Final
Switzerland (Kundert)	1	1	0	1	0	0	2	0	0	0	2	3	10
Scotland (Hay)	0	0	1	0	1	1	0	3	1	1	0	0	8

Team	1	2	3	4	5	6	7	8	9	10	11	12	Final
United States (Roberts)	0	3	2	0	2	0	0	4	2	0	4	0	17
France (Sulpice)	2	0	0	1	0	2	1	0	0	2	0	1	9

=== Draw 3 ===
Team	1	2	3	4	5	6	7	8	9	10	11	12	Final
France (Sulpice)	0	0	0	0	1	0	0	0	0	0	0	0	1
Canada (Northcott)	2	6	4	2	0	1	1	3	0	1	1	2	23

Team	1	2	3	4	5	6	7	8	9	10	11	12	Final
Switzerland (Kundert)	0	0	2	0	1	0	1	0	1	0	0	1	6
Sweden (Dracke)	1	1	0	3	0	1	0	1	0	1	1	0	9

Team	1	2	3	4	5	6	7	8	9	10	11	12	Final
Scotland (Hay)	1	2	0	4	0	2	4	0	4	0	2	3	22
Norway (Wiedemann)	0	0	1	0	2	0	0	1	0	1	0	0	5

=== Draw 4 ===
Team	1	2	3	4	5	6	7	8	9	10	11	12	Final
France (Sulpice)	1	0	0	0	0	0	1	1	0	1	3	0	7
Switzerland (Kundert)	0	0	3	4	4	1	0	0	1	0	0	2	15

Team	1	2	3	4	5	6	7	8	9	10	11	12	Final
Canada (Northcott)	0	0	4	0	1	4	0	3	1	0	3	0	16
Scotland (Hay)	1	3	0	1	0	0	1	0	0	1	0	1	8

Team	1	2	3	4	5	6	7	8	9	10	11	12	Final
Sweden (Dracke)	0	0	0	2	0	0	2	0	1	1	0	0	6
United States (Roberts)	2	1	1	0	3	2	0	2	0	0	0	2	13

=== Draw 5 ===
Team	1	2	3	4	5	6	7	8	9	10	11	12	Final
Switzerland (Kundert)	0	0	1	0	1	0	1	0	0	1	1	0	5
United States (Roberts)	1	3	0	3	0	1	0	2	2	0	0	1	13

Team	1	2	3	4	5	6	7	8	9	10	11	12	Final
Sweden (Dracke)	4	0	3	1	0	3	0	1	0	1	2	0	15
France (Sulpice)	0	2	0	0	1	0	1	0	1	0	0	1	6

Team	1	2	3	4	5	6	7	8	9	10	11	12	Final
Canada (Northcott)	0	1	0	1	1	0	0	3	1	0	4	0	11
Norway (Wiedemann)	0	0	0	0	0	1	0	0	0	1	0	3	5

=== Draw 6 ===
Team	1	2	3	4	5	6	7	8	9	10	11	12	Final
Norway (Wiedemann)	0	0	1	0	0	0	2	0	0	0	0	0	3
United States (Roberts)	0	1	0	1	1	1	0	1	4	2	1	3	15

Team	1	2	3	4	5	6	7	8	9	10	11	12	Final
Switzerland (Kundert)	1	2	0	0	0	0	2	0	0	1	1	1	8
Canada (Northcott)	0	0	3	2	0	3	0	1	2	0	0	0	11

Team	1	2	3	4	5	6	7	8	9	10	11	12	Final
Scotland (Hay)	1	2	4	0	0	2	0	0	2	3	2	0	16
France (Sulpice)	0	0	0	1	2	0	2	2	0	0	0	1	8

=== Draw 7 ===
Team	1	2	3	4	5	6	7	8	9	10	11	12	Final
Canada (Northcott)	0	2	0	2	0	2	0	2	0	3	0	2	13
United States (Roberts)	1	0	0	0	2	0	3	0	3	0	1	0	10

Team	1	2	3	4	5	6	7	8	9	10	11	12	Final
Scotland (Hay)	1	2	0	3	1	0	1	0	0	1	0	4	13
Sweden (Dracke)	0	0	1	0	0	1	0	1	1	0	2	0	6

Team	1	2	3	4	5	6	7	8	9	10	11	12	Final
Norway (Wiedemann)	1	0	2	2	2	0	1	2	0	0	0	3	13
Switzerland (Kundert)	0	1	0	0	0	2	0	0	2	1	2	0	8

== Playoffs ==
Semi-final
1	Canada	15
4	Sweden	6
2	Scotland	14
3	United States	7

Final
1	Canada	12
2	Scotland	5

=== Semifinals ===
Team	1	2	3	4	5	6	7	8	9	10	11	12	Final
Canada (Northcott)	2	2	1	1	1	1	1	0	5	0	0	1	15
Sweden (Dracke)	0	0	0	0	0	0	0	2	0	1	3	0	6

Team	1	2	3	4	5	6	7	8	9	10	11	12	Final
Scotland (Hay)	0	4	0	1	0	0	2	2	1	0	2	2	14
United States (Roberts)	0	0	2	0	2	2	0	0	0	1	0	0	7

=== Final ===
Team	1	2	3	4	5	6	7	8	9	10	11	12	Final
Canada (Northcott)	1	2	1	0	2	0	3	1	0	2	0	X	12
Scotland (Hay)	0	0	0	2	0	1	0	0	0	0	2	X	5

1966 Scotch Cup Winner
(Canada)
Canada
7th title
