= Knut Bartels =

Swedish curler (born 1930)

- Curler
- Born: 24 June 1930

Team
- Curling club: Norrköpings CK, Norrköping, SWE
- Skip: Rolf Arfwidsson
- Third: Knut Bartels
- Second: Per Ivar Rydgren
- Lead: Arne Stern

Curling career
- Member Association: Sweden
- World Championship: 1 (1962)
Medal record
Curling
Swedish Men's Championship
Gold medal – first place	1962

Knut Göran "Kåge" Bartels (born 24 June 1930) is a Swedish former curler. He was the third man on the Norrköpings CK, the Swedish curling team, during the 1962 Scotch Cup.

Bartels and his team won his lone Swedish Men's Curling Championship in 1962, and represented Sweden at the 1962 Scotch Cup World Championships. There, they lost all their games. One factor that was to their disfavour was that the Swedes were used to a rule where they had to release the rock before the tee-line, which was not the rule in international play.

Bartels would not win another Swedish men's championships, but won a national seniors championship in 1975 (again with 1962 teammates Rolf Arfwidsson and Arne Stern).

In 1974 he was inducted into the Swedish Curling Hall of Fame.
