= Gene Ovesen =

American curler (1928–2019)

- Curler ♂
- Born: July 4, 1928; Superior, Wisconsin, U.S.
- Died: May 1, 2019 (aged 90); Superior, Wisconsin, U.S.

Team
- Curling club: Superior CC, Superior, Wisconsin

Curling career
- Member Association: United States
- World Championship: 1 (1969)
Medal record
Curling
World Championships
Silver medal – second place	1969 Perth
United States Men's Championship
Gold medal – first place	1969 Grand Forks

Eugene J. Ovesen (July 4, 1928 – May 1, 2019) was an American curler from Superior, Wisconsin.

He was a 1969 World Men's silver medallist and a 1969 United States men's curling champion.

== Teams ==
Season	Skip	Third	Second	Lead	Events
1968–69	Bud Somerville	Bill Strum	Franklin Bradshaw	Gene Ovesen	USMCC 1969 (gold); WCC 1969 (silver)
