= Olle Gewalt =

Swedish male curler

- Curler ♂
- Born: 1 February 1921
- Died: 1985 (aged 63–64)

Team
- Curling club: AIK CK, Stockholm

Curling career
- Member Association: Sweden
- World Championship: 1 (1966)
Medal record
Curling
Swedish Men's Championship
| Gold medal – first place | 1966 |

Olle Gewalt (1 February 1921 – 1985) was a Swedish curler.

He was a 1966 Swedish men's curling champion.

He was employed as a construction engineer.

== Teams ==
| Season | Skip | Third | Second | Lead | Events |
|---|---|---|---|---|---|
| 1965–66 | Lars Dracke | Olle Gewalt | Ove Ingels | Sven Fryksenius | SMCC 1966 (gold); WCC 1966 (4th) |
