= Jean Albert Sulpice =

French curler (1912–1985)

- Curler
- Born: 2 November 1912; Châteauneuf-du-Pape, France
- Died: 11 September 1985 (aged 72); Cluses, France

Team
- Curling club: Megève CC, Megève, Mont d'Arbois CC, Megève

Curling career
- Member Association: France
- World Championship: 3 (1966, 1967, 1970)
Medal record
Curling
French Men's Championship
Gold medal – first place	1960
Gold medal – first place	1961
Gold medal – first place	1964
Gold medal – first place	1967
Gold medal – first place	1970

Jean Albert Sulpice (2 November 1912 – 11 September 1985) was a French curler.

== Biography ==
Sulpice was born in Châteauneuf-du-Pape on 2 November 1912. He competed for France at three World Men's championships (1966, 1967, 1970), two times as skip. At the national level, he competed from Club de curling Mont d'Arbois (Megève), five-time French men's champion. Sulpice died in Cluses on 11 September 1985, at the age of 72.

== Curling teams ==
Season	Skip	Third	Second	Lead	Events
1965–66	Jean Albert Sulpice	Alain Bozon	André Ducrey	Maurice Sulpice	WCC 1966 (7th)
1966–67	Jean Albert Sulpice	Maurice Sulpice	Phillipe Chambat	Pierre Boan	WCC 1967 (6th)
1969–70	Pierre Boan	Jean Albert Sulpice	Alain Bozon	Maurice Sulpice	WCC 1970 (6th)
