= Derek Scott (curler) =

Scottish male curler

- Curler ♂

Team
- Curling club: St. Martins CC, Perth

Curling career
- Member Association: Scotland
- World Championship: 3 (1969, 1970, 1976)
Medal record
Curling
World Championship
Silver medal – second place	1970 Utica
Silver medal – second place	1976 Duluth
Bronze medal – third place	1969 Perth
Scottish Men's Championship
Gold medal – first place	1969
Gold medal – first place	1970
Gold medal – first place	1976

Derek Scott is a Scottish curler.

He is a World Men's silver medallist (1970, 1976), bronze medallist (1969) and three-time Scottish men's champion.

== Teams ==
Season	Skip	Third	Second	Lead	Alternate	Events
1968–69	Bill Muirhead	George Haggart	Derek Scott	Alex Young	Murray Melville (WMCC)	SMCC 1969 (gold); WMCC 1969 (bronze)
1969–70	Bill Muirhead	George Haggart	Derek Scott	Murray Melville		SMCC 1970 (gold); WMCC 1970 (silver)
1970–71	Bill Muirhead	Bill Reid	Derek Scott	Len Dudman		
1975–76	Bill Muirhead	Derek Scott	Len Dudman	Roy Sinclair		SMCC 1976 (gold); WMCC 1976 (silver)

== Membership of Errol curling club ==
Derek Scott was a member of Errol curling club (Perthshire), Scotland for 29 seasons, joining in 1961–62, with his last season as a member being 1990–91. He served as President of the club in 1967–68.
