= Mike Slyziuk =

American curler

- Curler
- Born: September 18, 1918; Grandview, Manitoba, Canada
- Died: October 10, 2003 (aged 85)

Team
- Curling club: Detroit CC, Detroit
- Skip: Mike Slyziuk
- Third: Nelson Brown
- Second: Ernie Slyziuk
- Lead: Walter Hubchick

Curling career
- World Championship: 1 (1963)
Medal record
Representing USA
Men's Curling
World championships
Bronze medal – third place	1963 Perth	Team
United States Men's Championship
Gold medal – first place	1958 Milwaukee
Gold medal – first place	1963 Duluth

Michael A. Slyziuk (September 18, 1918 – October 10, 2003) was the Skip on the Detroit CC curling team (from Detroit, Michigan, United States) during the 1963 World Curling Championships known as the Scotch Cup, where United States team finished with bronze medals.

After serving in the Canadian Army, he moved to Windsor, Ontario in 1942. He joined the Detroit Curling Club in 1948 and served as its President in 1969-70. An active curler for over 35 years, he was U.S. National Champion in 1958 and 1963, attending the Nationals ten times.

In 1990 he was inducted to United States Curling Hall of Fame.

== Personal life ==
Slyziuk was employed as a businessman. He also played baseball in his youth. He was married to Rose Slyziuk. Later in life, he lived in Sun City, Florida and Denver, Colorado.
