= George Haggart =

Scottish male curler

- Curler ♂

Team
- Curling club: St. Martins CC, Perth

Curling career
- Member Association: Scotland
- World Championship: 3 (1969, 1970, 1976)
Medal record
Curling
World Championship
Silver medal – second place	1970 Utica
Bronze medal – third place	1969 Perth
Scottish Men's Championship
Gold medal – first place	1969
Gold medal – first place	1970

George Haggart is a Scottish curler.

He is a World Men's silver medallist (1970), bronze medallist (1969) and two-time Scottish men's champion.

== Teams ==
Season	Skip	Third	Second	Lead	Alternate	Events
1968–69	Bill Muirhead	George Haggart	Derek Scott	Alex Young	Murray Melville (WMCC)	SMCC 1969 (gold); WMCC 1969 (bronze)
1969–70	Bill Muirhead	George Haggart	Derek Scott	Murray Melville		SMCC 1970 (gold); WMCC 1970 (silver)
