= Svante Ödman =

Swedish male curler

- Curler ♂
- Born: 22 June 1943 (age 83)

Team
- Curling club: Djursholms CK, Stockholm

Curling career
- Member Association: Sweden
- World Championship: 1 (1978)
Medal record
Curling
Swedish Men's Championship
Gold medal – first place	1978

Svante Herman Nils Ödman (born 22 June 1943) is a Swedish curler.

He is a 1978 Swedish men's curling champion.

In 1976, he was inducted into the Swedish Curling Hall of Fame.

== Teams ==
=== Men's ===
Season	Skip	Third	Second	Lead	Events
1977–78	Tom Schaeffer	Svante Ödman	Fred Ridderstad	Claes-Göran Carlman	SMCC 1978 (gold); WCC 1978 (4th)
1988–89	Tom Schaeffer	Svante Ödman	Stig Johnson	Sven Fryksenius	SSCC 1989 (gold)

=== Mixed ===
Season	Skip	Third	Second	Lead	Events
1971	Stig Johnson	Barbro Johnson	Svante Ödman	Suzanne Ödman	SMxCC 1971 (gold)
