= Christer Källén =

Swedish curler (1940–2019)

- Curler ♂
- Born: 13 September 1940
- Died: 22 January 2019 (aged 78); Nyköping

Team
- Curling club: Stallmästaregårdens CK, Stockholm

Curling career
- Member Association: Sweden
- World Championship: 1 (1970)
Medal record
Curling
World Championships
Bronze medal – third place	1970 Utica
Swedish Men's Championship
Gold medal – first place	1970

Christer Källén (13 September 1940 – 22 January 2019) was a Swedish curler.

He was a 1970 World Men's bronze medallist and a 1970 Swedish men's curling champion.

In 1973 he was inducted into the Swedish Curling Hall of Fame.

== Teams ==
Season	Skip	Third	Second	Lead	Events
1969–70	Claes Källén (fourth)	Christer Källén	Sture Lindén	Tom Schaeffer (skip)	SMCC 1970 (gold); WCC 1970 (bronze)

== Personal life ==
Christer's younger brother Claes is also a curler and his teammate.
