= Heinz Beutler =

Swiss curler

- Curler ♂

Team
- Curling club: Bern-Zähringer CC, Bern

Curling career
- Member Association: Switzerland
- World Championship: 1 (1969)
Medal record
Curling

Heinz Beutler is a former Swiss curler.

At the international level, he skipped Swiss men's team on 1969 World Men's Championship.

He started curling in 1962.

== Teams ==
| Season | Skip | Third | Second | Lead | Events |
|---|---|---|---|---|---|
| 1968—69 | Heinz Beutler | Mario Bettosini | Jean-Pierre Mühlemann | Kurt Schneider | WCC 1969 (5th) |
