= 1963 Scotch Cup =

- Host city: Perth, Scotland
- Arena: Perth Ice Rink
- Dates: March 13–15, 1963
- Winner: Canada
- Curling club: Regina CC; Regina, Saskatchewan
- Skip: Ernie Richardson
- Third: Arnold Richardson
- Second: Garnet Richardson
- Lead: Mel Perry

The 1963 Scotch Cup was the fifth edition of the Scotch Cup and was held from March 13–15 in Perth, Scotland at the Perth Ice Rink. Canada won to take the title after winning five of their six matches with the only loss being against the United States in Draw 1.

== Teams ==
Canada	Scotland	Sweden	United States
Regina CC, Regina, Saskatchewan Skip: Ernie Richardson; Third: Arnold Richardson; Second: Garnet Richardson; Lead: Mel Perry	Kilgraston & Moncrieffe CC, Perth Skip: Chuck Hay; Third: John Bryden; Second: Alan Glen; Lead: Jimmy Hamilton	Åredalens CK, Åre Skip: John-Allan Månsson; Third: Curt Jonsson; Second: Gustav Larsson; Lead: Magnus Berge; Alternate: Sven A. Eklund	Detroit CC, Detroit, Michigan Skip: Mike Slyziuk; Third: Nelson Brown; Second: Ernie Slyziuk; Lead: Walter Hubchick

== Standings ==
Country	Skip	W	L
Canada	Ernie Richardson	5	1
Scotland	Chuck Hay	3	3
United States	Mike Slyziuk	3	3
Sweden	John-Allan Månsson	1	5

== Results ==
=== Draw 1 ===
Team	Final
United States (Slyziuk)	7
Canada (Richardson)	6

Team	Final
Scotland (Hay)	15
Sweden (Månsson)	4

=== Draw 2 ===
Team	Final
United States (Slyziuk)	9
Scotland (Hay)	7

Team	Final
Canada (Richardson)	22
Sweden (Månsson)	4

=== Draw 3 ===
Team	Final
Canada (Richardson)	8
Scotland (Hay)	7

Team	Final
United States (Slyziuk)	18
Sweden (Månsson)	3

=== Draw 4 ===
Team	Final
Canada (Richardson)	14
Sweden (Månsson)	8

Team	Final
Scotland (Hay)	10
United States (Slyziuk)	8

=== Draw 5 ===
Team	Final
Canada (Richardson)	13
United States (Slyziuk)	6

Team	Final
Scotland (Hay)	19
Sweden (Månsson)	5

=== Draw 6 ===
Team	Final
Canada (Richardson)	11
Scotland (Hay)	6

Team	Final
Sweden (Månsson)	10
United States (Slyziuk)	6

1963 Scotch Cup
Canada
5th title
