= Ernie Slyziuk =

American curler

- Curler
- Born: March 12, 1920; Manitoba, Canada
- Died: January 2, 2001 (aged 80)

Team
- Curling club: Detroit CC, Detroit
- Skip: Mike Slyziuk
- Third: Nelson Brown
- Second: Ernie Slyziuk
- Lead: Walter Hubchick

Curling career
- Member Association: United States
Medal record
Men's Curling
World Men's Championships
Bronze medal – third place	1963 Perth
United States Men's Championship
Gold medal – first place	1958 Milwaukee
Gold medal – first place	1963 Duluth

Ernest Slyziuk (March 12, 1920 – January 2, 2001) was an American curler, nicknamed the Mighty Mite. He played second on the Detroit Curling Club team (from Detroit, Michigan) during the Curling World Championships known as the 1963 Scotch Cup. Slyziuk and his team ended up taking third place and were awarded the bronze medal.

He joined the Detroit Curling Club in 1950 and served as its President in 1978–79 and 1979–80. An active curler for over 30 years, he was U.S. National Champion in 1958 and 1963, attending the Nationals ten times.

In 1996 he was inducted to United States Curling Hall of Fame.

He started curling at the age of 12 with his older brother Mike Slyziuk in Grandview, Manitoba, Canada where they were born.
