= Claes Källén =

Swedish male curler

- Curler ♂
- Born: 12 May 1943 (age 83)

Team
- Curling club: Stallmästaregårdens CK, Stockholm

Curling career
- Member Association: Sweden
- World Championship: 1 (1970)
Medal record
Curling
World Championships
Bronze medal – third place	1970 Utica
Swedish Men's Championship
Gold medal – first place	1970

Claes Urban Källén (born 12 May 1943) is a Swedish curler.

He is a 1970 World Men's bronze medallist and a 1970 Swedish men's curling champion.

In 1971 he was inducted into the Swedish Curling Hall of Fame.

== Teams ==
Season	Skip	Third	Second	Lead	Events
1969–70	Claes Källén (fourth)	Christer Källén	Sture Lindén	Tom Schaeffer (skip)	SMCC 1970 (gold); WCC 1970 (bronze)

== Personal life ==
Claes' older brother Christer was also a curler and his teammate.
