= Carl von Wendt =

Swedish male curler

- Curler ♂
- Born: 7 March 1953 (age 73)

Team
- Curling club: Karlstads CK, Karlstad

Curling career
- Member Association: Sweden
- World Championship: 1 (1984)
- European Championship: 1 (1989)
- Other appearances: World Senior Championships: 1 (2008)
Medal record
Curling
World Championships
Bronze medal – third place	1984 Duluth
Swedish Men's Championship
Gold medal – first place	1985
Gold medal – first place	1989
World Senior Championships
Silver medal – second place	2008 Vierumäki

Carl Johan Alexander von Wendt (born 7 March 1953) is a Swedish curler.

He is a 1984 World bronze medallist.

== Teams ==
Season	Skip	Third	Second	Lead	Events
1983–84	Connie Östlund (fourth)	Per Lindeman (skip)	Carl von Wendt	Bo Andersson	WCC 1984 (bronze)
1984–85	Connie Östlund (fourth)	Per Lindeman (skip)	Carl von Wendt	Bo Andersson	SMCC 1985 (gold)
1988–89	Per Lindeman	Lars Lindgren	Göran Åberg	Carl von Wendt	SMCC 1989 (gold)
1989–90	Per Lindeman	Bo Andersson	Göran Åberg	Carl von Wendt	ECC 1989 (5th)
2007–08	Per Lindeman	Bo Andersson	Carl von Wendt	Gunnar Åberg	WSCC 2008 (silver)
