= Fred Ridderstad =

Swedish male curler

- Curler ♂
- Born: 23 July 1948 (age 78)

Team
- Curling club: Djursholms CK, Stockholm

Curling career
- Member Association: Sweden
- World Championship: 1 (1978)
Medal record
Curling
Swedish Men's Championship
Gold medal – first place	1978

Pieter Carl Fredrik Thill Iansson Ridderstad (born 23 July 1948) is a Swedish curler.

He is a 1978 Swedish men's curling champion.

== Teams ==
Season	Skip	Third	Second	Lead	Events
1977–78	Tom Schaeffer	Svante Ödman	Fred Ridderstad	Claes-Göran Carlman	SMCC 1978 (gold); WCC 1978 (4th)
