= Art Tallackson =

American male curler

- Curler ♂
- Born: June 12, 1933; Grafton, North Dakota, U.S.
- Died: September 23, 2012 (aged 79); Grand Forks, North Dakota, U.S.

Team
- Curling club: Grafton CC, Grafton, ND

Curling career
- Member Association: United States
- World Championship: 1 (1970)
Medal record
Curling
United States Men's Championship
Gold medal – first place	1970 Ardsley

Arthur J. "Junie" Tallackson, Jr (June 12, 1933 – September 23, 2012) was an American curler.

At the national level, he was a 1970 United States men's curling champion.

At the international level, he skipped United States men's team on 1970 World Men's championship where the finished on fourth place.

== Teams ==
Season	Skip	Third	Second	Lead	Events
1969–70	Art Tallackson	Glenn Gilleshammer	Ray Holt	Trueman Thompson	USMCC 1970 (gold); WCC 1970 (4th)
