= Nelson Brown =

American curler

- Curler

Team
- Curling club: Detroit CC, Detroit
- Skip: Mike Slyziuk
- Third: Nelson Brown
- Second: Ernie Slyziuk
- Lead: Walter Hubchick

Curling career
- World Championship: 1 (1963)
Medal record
Representing USA
Men's Curling
World championships
Bronze medal – third place	1963 Perth	Team
United States Men's Championship
Gold medal – first place	1963 Duluth

J. Nelson Brown was an American curler. He played third on the Detroit Curling Club team (from Detroit, Michigan, United States) during the World Curling Championships known as the 1963 Scotch Cup, where United States team finished with bronze medals.

In 1990 he was inducted to United States Curling Hall of Fame.
