= Gerry Toutant =

American curler

- Curler ♂

Team
- Curling club: Fargo CC, Fargo, North Dakota

Curling career
- Member Association: United States
- World Championship: 1 (1966)
Medal record
Curling
World Championships
Bronze medal – third place	1966 Vancouver
United States Men's Championship
Gold medal – first place	1966 Hibbing

Gerry Toutant is an American curler.

He is a 1966 World Men's bronze medallist and a 1966 United States men's curling champion.

== Teams ==
Season	Skip	Third	Second	Lead	Events
1965–66	Bruce Roberts	Joe Zbacnik	Gerry Toutant	Mike O'Leary	USMCC 1966 (gold); WCC 1966 (bronze)
