= Rolf Arfwidsson =

Swedish curler (1928–2021)

- Curler
- Born: 11 May 1928; Norrköping
- Died: 2 August 2021 (aged 93)

Team
- Curling club: Norrköpings CK, Norrköping, SWE
- Skip: Rolf Arfwidsson
- Third: Knut Bartels
- Second: Per Ivar Rydgren
- Lead: Arne Stern

Curling career
- Member Association: Sweden
- World Championship: 1 (1962)
Medal record
Curling
Swedish Men's Championship
Gold medal – first place	1962

Rolf Arfwidsson (11 May 1928 – 2 August 2021) was the skip of the Norrköpings CK, a Swedish curling team, during the 1962 Scotch Cup, the first Swedish team to play at the World Curling Championships.

Arfwidsson and his team won his lone Swedish Men's Curling Championship in 1962, and represented Sweden at the 1962 Scotch Cup World Championships. There, they lost all their games. One factor that was to their disfavour was that the Swedes were used to a rule where they had to release the rock before the tee-line, which was not the rule in international play.

Arfwidsson would not win another Swedish men's championships, but won a national seniors championship in 1975 and a national masters title in 2012.

He was a board member of the Swedish Curling Association (SCA) from 1964 to 1970 and SCA chairman from 1966 to 1970.

In 1971 he was inducted into the Swedish Curling Hall of Fame.

== Personal life ==
Arfwidsson was married to fellow Swedish curler Barbro Arfwidsson, who was a 1978 European champion and 1986 World bronze medallist. His father Dan won the Swedish Men's Curling Championship in 1923. His daughter Gunilla Arfwidsson-Edlund is also a curler, and won a bronze medal at the 2016 World Senior Curling Championships.

Arfwidsson received a law degree in 1954, and worked at a law firm in his hometown. He would later become CEO of a building material business. He then ran his own corporate accounting law firm until he was 89 years old. He was married and had three children.
