= Bengt Oscarius =

Swedish male curler

- Curler
- Born: 4 September 1944 (age 82)

Team
- Curling club: Djursholms CK, Stockholm

Curling career
- Member Association: Sweden
- World Championship: 3 (1969, 1972, 1973)
- European Championship: 2 (1975, 1982)
Medal record
Curling
World Championships
Gold medal – first place	1973 Regina
European Championships
Silver medal – second place	1975 Megève
Swedish Men's Championship
Gold medal – first place	1969
Gold medal – first place	1972
Gold medal – first place	1973

Bengt Oscarius (born 4 September 1944) is a Swedish curler.

He is a 1973 World Men's champion and a three-time Swedish men's curling champion (1969, 1972, 1973).

In 1973 he was inducted into the Swedish Curling Hall of Fame.

== Teams ==
Season	Skip	Third	Second	Lead	Events
1968–69	Kjell Oscarius	Bengt Oscarius	Claes-Göran "Boa" Carlman	Christer Wessel	SMCC 1969 (gold); WCC 1969 (4th)
1971–72	Kjell Oscarius	Tom Schaeffer	Bengt Oscarius	Claes-Göran "Boa" Carlman	SMCC 1972 (gold); WCC 1972 (8th)
1972–73	Kjell Oscarius	Bengt Oscarius	Tom Schaeffer	Claes-Göran "Boa" Carlman	SMCC 1973 (gold); WCC 1973 (gold)
1975–76	Kjell Oscarius	Bengt Oscarius	Tom Schaeffer	Claes-Göran "Boa" Carlman	ECC 1975 (silver)
1982–83	Tom Schaeffer	Bengt Oscarius	Lars Hegert	Claes-Göran "Boa" Carlman	ECC 1982 (5th)

== Personal life ==
Bengt's older brother Kjell is also a curler and teammate.
