= Connie Östlund =

Swedish male curler

- Curler ♂
- Born: 22 February 1960
- Died: 27 October 2023 (aged 63)

Team
- Curling club: Karlstads CK, Karlstad

Curling career
- Member Association: Sweden
- World Championship: 2 (1982, 1984)
- European Championship: 1 (1985)
- Other appearances: World Senior Championships: 2 (2012, 2014)
Medal record
Curling
World Championships
Bronze medal – third place	1984 Duluth
European Championships
Silver medal – second place	1985 Grindelwald
Swedish Men's Championship
Gold medal – first place	1982
Gold medal – first place	1985
World Senior Championships
Silver medal – second place	2014 Dumfries
Bronze medal – third place	2012 Tårnby

Connie Östlund (22 February 1960 – 27 October 2023) was a Swedish curler.

He was a 1984 World bronze medallist and 1985 European silver medallist.

In 2015 he was inducted into the Swedish Curling Hall of Fame.

== Teams ==
Season	Skip	Third	Second	Lead	Alternate	Coach	Events
1981–82	Connie Östlund	Tony Eng	Henrik Holmberg	Anders Svennerstedt			SMCC 1982 (gold)
1981–82	Sören Grahn	Connie Östlund	Niclas Järund	Tony Eng			WCC 1982 (4th)
1983–84	Connie Östlund (fourth)	Per Lindeman (skip)	Carl von Wendt	Bo Andersson			WCC 1984 (bronze)
1984–85	Connie Östlund (fourth)	Per Lindeman (skip)	Carl von Wendt	Bo Andersson			SMCC 1985 (gold)
1985–86	Connie Östlund (fourth)	Per Lindeman (skip)	Bo Andersson	Göran Åberg			ECC 1985 (silver)
2011–12	Connie Östlund	Morgan Fredholm	Lars Lindgren	Glenn Franzén	Stig Sewik	Stig Sewik	WSCC 2012 (bronze)
2013–14	Connie Östlund	Morgan Fredholm	Lars Lindgren	Glenn Franzén	Lennart Carlsson		WSCC 2014 (silver)

== Personal life ==
Connie Östlund was married to Bitte Berg-Östlund, former Swedish curler, she played for Sweden on World and European championships. Their daughter Cecilia Östlund is a curler too, who became 2011 World champion.
