= 1970 Air Canada Silver Broom =

- Host city: Utica, New York, United States
- Arena: Utica Memorial Auditorium
- Dates: 18–22 March 1970
- Winner: Canada
- Curling club: Granite CC, Winnipeg, Manitoba
- Skip: Don Duguid
- Third: Rod Hunter
- Second: Jim Pettapiece
- Lead: Bryan Wood
- Finalist: Scotland

The 1970 Air Canada Silver Broom, the men's world curling championship, was held at the Utica Memorial Auditorium in Utica, New York, United States, between 18 and 22 of March 1970.

The event was sparsely attended, with only 200–300 fans for some of the afternoon games and about 2,000 for the final. In one draw, bored high school students began booing and cheering shots before throwing paperclips onto the ice, which "caused havoc with a number of shots."

== Teams ==
Canada	France	Germany	Norway^{[Note 1]}
Granite CC, Winnipeg, Manitoba Skip: Don Duguid; Third: Rod Hunter; Second: Jim Pettapiece; Lead: Bryan Wood	Mont d'Arbois CC, Megève Skip: Pierre Boan; Third: Jean Albert Sulpice; Second: Alain Bozon; Lead: Maurice Sulpice	EC Oberstdorf, Oberstdorf Skip: Manfred Räderer; Third: Ernst Hege; Second: Peter Jacoby; Lead: Hansjörg Jacoby	Stabekk CC, Oslo Fourth: Knut Bjaanaes; Third: Geir Søiland; Second: Per Dammen; Skip: Josef Bjaanaes^{[Note 2]}
Scotland	Sweden	Switzerland	United States
St. Martins CC, Perth Skip: Bill Muirhead; Third: George Haggart; Second: Derek Scott; Lead: Murray Melville	Stallmästargården CK, Stockholm Fourth: Claes Källén; Third: Christer Källén; Second: Sture Lindén; Skip: Tom Schaeffer^{[Note 2]}	Lausanne CC, Lausanne Skip: Roland Schenkel; Third: Paul Metraux; Second: Ernst Pochon; Lead: Michel Weill	Grafton CC, Grafton, North Dakota Skip: Art Tallackson; Third: Glenn Gilleshammer; Second: Ray Holt; Lead: Trueman Thompson

Notes
^Note 1 Unclear participants.
^Note 2 Throws Lead rocks.

== Standings ==
Key
Teams to playoffs
Teams to tiebreaker

Country	Skip	W	L
Canada	Don Duguid	7	0
Scotland	Bill Muirhead	6	1
Sweden	Tom Schaeffer	4	3
United States	Art Tallackson	4	3
Norway	Josef Bjaanaes	4	3
France	Pierre Boan	1	6
Germany	Manfred Räderer	1	6
Switzerland	Roland Schenkel	1	6

== Results ==
=== Draw 1 ===
Team	Final
Scotland (Muirhead)	16
Germany (Räderer)	6

Team	Final
Sweden (Schaeffer)	19
France (Boan)	4

Team	Final
Canada (Duguid)	16
Switzerland (Schenkel)	8

Team	Final
United States (Tallackson)	14
Norway (Bjaanaes)	8

=== Draw 2 ===
Team	Final
Sweden (Schaeffer)	17
United States (Tallackson)	3

Team	Final
Canada (Duguid)	9
Scotland (Muirhead)	5

Team	Final
Norway (Bjaanaes)	14
Germany (Räderer)	6

Team	Final
Switzerland (Schenkel)	11
France (Boan)	9

=== Draw 3 ===
Team	Final
Scotland (Muirhead)	10
Switzerland (Schenkel)	4

Team	Final
Norway (Bjaanaes)	8
Sweden (Schaeffer)	4

Team	Final
United States (Tallackson)	9
France (Boan)	8

Team	Final
Canada (Duguid)	20
Germany (Räderer)	4

=== Draw 4 ===
Team	Final
Norway (Bjaanaes)	17
France (Boan)	7

Team	Final
Germany (Räderer)	8
Switzerland (Schenkel)	7

Team	Final
Canada (Duguid)	12
Sweden (Schaeffer)	4

Team	Final
Scotland (Muirhead)	8
United States (Tallackson)	7

=== Draw 5 ===
Team	Final
Sweden (Schaeffer)	11
Germany (Räderer)	6

Team	Final
Scotland (Muirhead)	7
France (Boan)	6

Team	Final
United States (Tallackson)	15
Switzerland (Schenkel)	3

Team	Final
Canada (Duguid)	14
Norway (Bjaanaes)	6

=== Draw 6 ===
Team	Final
Canada (Duguid)	10
United States (Tallackson)	8

Team	Final
Norway (Bjaanaes)	10
Switzerland (Schenkel)	5

Team	Final
Scotland (Muirhead)	9
Sweden (Schaeffer)	7

Team	Final
France (Boan)	14
Germany (Räderer)	4

=== Draw 7 ===
Team	Final
Canada (Duguid)	16
France (Boan)	5

Team	Final
United States (Tallackson)	12
Germany (Räderer)	11

Team	Final
Scotland (Muirhead)	9
Norway (Bjaanaes)	6

Team	Final
Sweden (Schaeffer)	11
Switzerland (Schenkel)	4

== Tiebreaker ==
=== Tiebreaker 1 ===
Team	Final
United States (Tallackson)	10
Norway (Bjaanaes)	7

=== Tiebreaker 2 ===
Team	Final
Sweden (Schaeffer)	6
United States (Tallackson)	3

== Playoffs ==
Semi-Final			Final
			1	Canada	11
2	Scotland	8	2	Scotland	4
3	Sweden	7

=== Semifinal ===
Team	Final
Scotland (Muirhead)	8
Sweden (Schaeffer)	7

=== Final ===
Team	Final
Canada (Duguid)	11
Scotland (Muirhead)	4

1970 Air Canada Silver Broom
(Canada)
Canada
10th title
