= Gustav Larsson (curler) =

Swedish curler

- Curler
- Born: 8 March 1914
- Died: 1973 (aged 58–59)

Team
- Curling club: Åredalens CK
- Skip: John-Allan Månsson
- Third: Curt Jonsson
- Second: Gustav Larsson
- Lead: Magnus Berge
- Alternate: Sven A. Eklund

Gustav Larsson (8 March 1914 - 1973) was the second on the Åredalens CK curling team (from Åre, Sweden) during the World Curling Championships (known as the Scotch Cup) 1963 and 1964.

In 1966 he was inducted into the Swedish Curling Hall of Fame.
