= John-Allan Månsson =

Swedish curler

- Curler
- Born: 2 July 1934
- Died: 3 November 2003 (aged 69)

Team
- Curling club: Åredalens CK, Åre
- Fourth: John-Allan Månsson
- Third: Curt Jonsson (skip)
- Second: Gustav Larsson
- Lead: Magnus Berge
- Alternate: Sven A. Eklund

John-Allen Månsson (2 July 1934 – 3 November 2003) was the fourth on the Åredalens CK curling team (from Åre, Sweden) during the World Curling Championships (known as the Scotch Cup) 1963 (Skip) and 1964.

In 1966 he was inducted into the Swedish Curling Hall of Fame.
