= Erik Berglöf (curler) =

Swedish harness racer and male curler

- Curler ♂
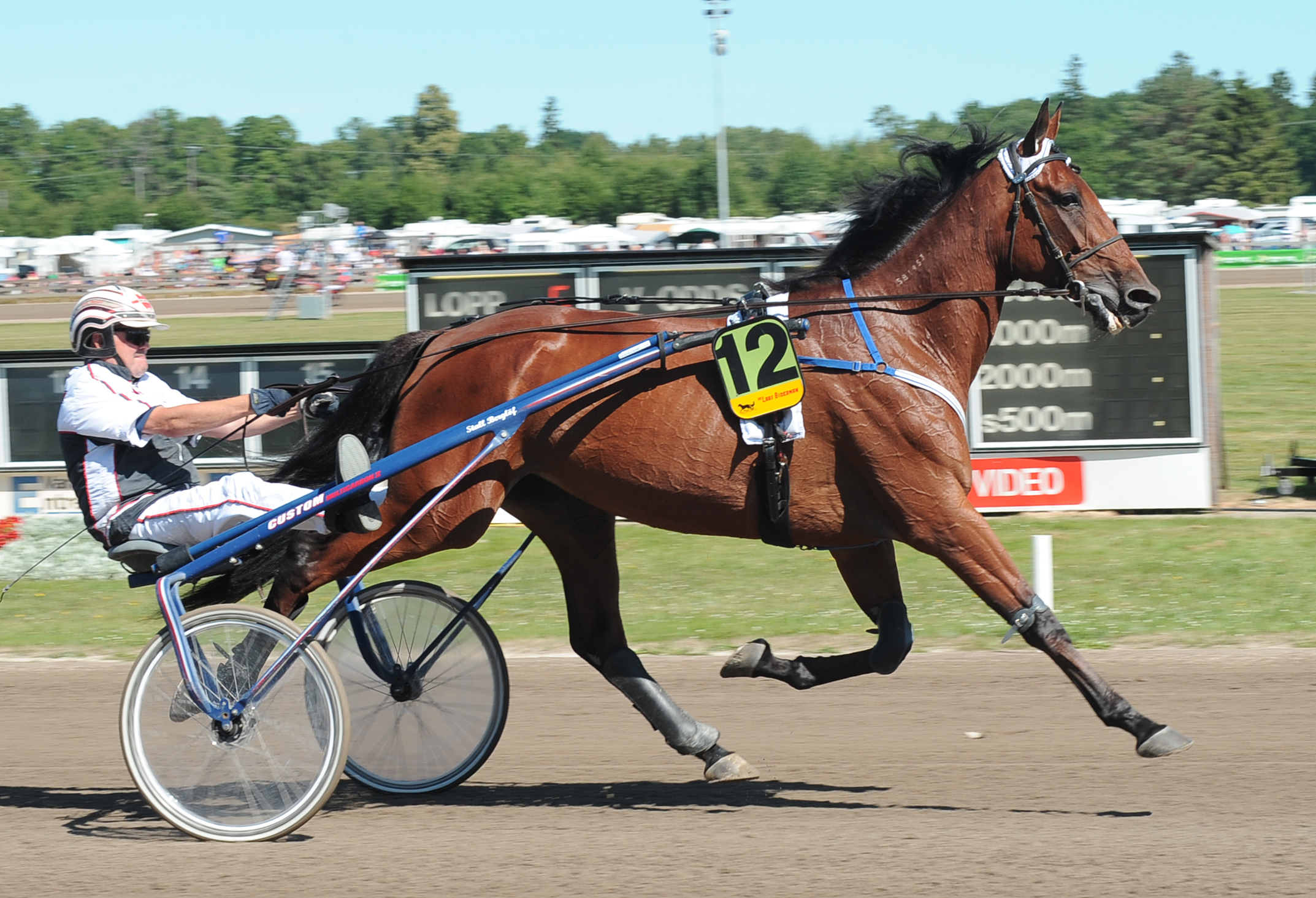
- Born: 21 March 1953 (age 73); Karlstad

Team
- Curling club: IF Göta, Karlstad, Karlstads CK, Karlstad

Curling career
- Member Association: Sweden
- World Championship: 1 (1971)
Medal record
Curling
Swedish Men's Championship
Gold medal – first place	1971

Roy Erik Berglöf (born 21 March 1953) is a Swedish harness racer and curler.

He is a 1971 Swedish men's curling champion.

== Teams ==
Season	Skip	Third	Second	Lead	Events
1970–71	Roy Berglöf (fourth)	Kjell Grengmark (skip)	Erik Berglöf	Lars-Erik Håkansson	SMCC 1971 (gold); WCC 1971 (5th)

== Personal life ==
His father Roy Berglöf was a curler too, Roy and Erik played together for Sweden at the 1971 World men's championship.
