= Per Lindeman =

Swedish curler

- Curler ♂
- Other names: Pelle
- Born: 20 December 1956 (age 69)

Team
- Curling club: IF Göta, Karlstad, Karlstads CK, Karlstad

Curling career
- Member Association: Sweden
- World Championship: 1 (1984)
- European Championship: 3 (1976, 1985, 1989)
- Other appearances: World Junior Championships 1 (1978), World Senior Championships: 1 (2008)
Medal record
Curling
World Championships
Bronze medal – third place	1984 Duluth
European Championships
Silver medal – second place	1985 Grindelwald
Bronze medal – third place	1976 West Berlin
Swedish Men's Championship
Gold medal – first place	1976
Gold medal – first place	1985
Gold medal – first place	1989
World Junior Championships
Silver medal – second place	1978 Grindelwald
World Senior Championships
Silver medal – second place	2008 Vierumäki

Per Gustav "Pelle" Lindeman (born 20 December 1956) is a Swedish curler.

He is a 1984 World bronze medallist, 1985 European silver medallist and 1976 European bronze medallist.

In 1989 he was inducted into the Swedish Curling Hall of Fame.

== Teams ==
=== Men's ===
Season	Skip	Third	Second	Lead	Events
1975–76	Jens Håkansson	Thomas Håkansson	Per Lindeman	Lars Lindgren	SMCC 1976 (gold)
1976–77	Jens Håkansson	Thomas Håkansson	Per Lindeman	Lars Lindgren	ECC 1976 (bronze)
1977–78	Thomas Håkansson	Per Lindeman	Lars Lindgren	Erik Björemo	SJCC 1978 (gold); WJCC 1978 (silver)
1983–84	Connie Östlund (fourth)	Per Lindeman (skip)	Carl von Wendt	Bo Andersson	WCC 1984 (bronze)
1984–85	Connie Östlund (fourth)	Per Lindeman (skip)	Carl von Wendt	Bo Andersson	SMCC 1985 (gold)
1985–86	Connie Östlund (fourth)	Per Lindeman (skip)	Bo Andersson	Göran Åberg	ECC 1985 (silver)
1988–89	Per Lindeman	Lars Lindgren	Göran Åberg	Carl von Wendt	SMCC 1989 (gold)
1989–90	Per Lindeman	Bo Andersson	Göran Åberg	Carl von Wendt	ECC 1989 (5th)
2007–08	Per Lindeman	Bo Andersson	Carl von Wendt	Gunnar Åberg	WSCC 2008 (silver)

=== Mixed ===
Season	Skip	Third	Second	Lead	Events
1982	Pelle Lindeman	Katarina Hultling	Håkan Ståhlbro	Birgitta Sewik	SMxCC 1982 (gold)
