= Magnus Berge =

Swedish curler

- Curler

Team
- Curling club: Åredalens CK
- Skip: John-Allan Månsson, Curt Jonsson
- Fourth: John-Allan Månsson
- Third: Curt Jonsson
- Second: Gustav Larsson
- Lead: Magnus Berge
- Alternate: Sven A. Eklund

Magnus Berge (February 16, 1909 – March 29, 2001) was the lead on the Åredalens CK curling team (from Åre, Sweden) during the World Curling Championships (known as the Scotch Cup) 1963 and 1964. In 1966 he was inducted into the Swedish Curling Hall of Fame.
