= Per Ivar Rydgren =

Swedish curler (born 1927)

- Curler
- Born: 6 January 1927

Team
- Curling club: Norrköpings CK, Norrköping, SWE
- Skip: Rolf Arfwidsson
- Third: Knut Bartels
- Second: Per Ivar Rydgren
- Lead: Arne Stern

Curling career
- Member Association: Sweden
- World Championship: 1 (1962)
Medal record
Curling
Swedish Men's Championship
Gold medal – first place	1962

Per Ivar Rydgren (or Per-Ivar) was the second on the Norrköpings CK curling team (from Sweden) during the World Curling Championships known as the 1962 Scotch Cup.

Rydgren and his team won his lone Swedish Men's Curling Championship in 1962, and represented Sweden at the 1962 Scotch Cup World Championships. There, they lost all their games. One factor that was to their disfavour was that the Swedes were used to a rule where they had to release the rock before the tee-line, which was not the rule in international play.
