= Rune Forsberg =

Swedish scholar of Old English

- Born: 1908
- Died: September 20, 1997 (aged 88–89)

Academic background
- Education: Uppsala University

Academic work
- Discipline: Linguistics
- Sub-discipline: Old English studies, Toponymy
- Institutions: Uppsala University
- Notable works: A Contribution to a Dictionary of Old English Place-names

Rune Forsberg (1908–20 September 1997) was a Swedish scholar of Old English.

== Life ==
Forsberg matriculated at Uppsala University in 1927, graduating with a master's degree (Fil.mag.) in 1932, a licentiate (Fil.lic.) in 1938, and a doctorate (PhD) in 1950. His thesis, A Contribution to a Dictionary of Old English Place-names, Nomina Germanica; arkiv för germansk namnforskning, 9 (Uppsala: Almqvist & Wiksell), had begun as a contribution to a planned place-name dictionary by Forsberg's teacher Robert Eugen Zachrisson, but Zachrisson's early death prevented the realisation of the dictionary itself. Yet Forsberg's work offered important insights into the origins of a range of place-names, and into the dating of Anglo-Saxon charters. Forsberg went on to work in Uppsala University's English department until his retirement in the mid-1970s. His final monograph, The Place-name Lewes: A Study of its Early Spellings and Etymology, Acta Universitatis Upsaliensis: Studia Anglistica Upsaliensia, 100 (Uppsala: Uppsala University, 1997), ISBN 9155441165 was published posthumously, seen through the press by Karl Inge Sandred and Bengt Lindström.
