= 2008 World Senior Curling Championships =

- Host city: Vierumäki, Finland
- Arena: Vierumäki Ice Rink
- Dates: March 9–15
- Men's winner: Canada
- Curling club: Thistle Curling Club, Edmonton
- Skip: Pat Ryan
- Third: Marvin Wirth
- Second: Ken Mclean
- Lead: Millard Evans
- Finalist: Sweden
- Women's winner: Canada
- Curling club: Lethbridge Curling Club, Lethbridge
- Skip: Diane Foster
- Third: Shirley McPherson
- Second: Shirley Kohuch
- Lead: Chris Wilson
- Finalist: Scotland

The 2008 World Senior Curling Championships were held from March 9 to 15 at the Vierumäki Ice Rink in Vierumäki, Finland. Teams from Alberta, Canada won both the men's and women's events.

== Men ==
=== Round-robin standings ===
Group A	Skip	W	L
United States	David Russell	7	1
Scotland	Graeme Adam	7	1
Finland	Mauno Nummila	7	1
Ireland	Tony Tierney	5	3
England	D. Michael Sutherland	4	4
New Zealand	Peter Becker	3	5
Italy	Gino Savoi	2	6
Iceland	Gisli Kristinsson	1	7
Norway	Leif Hald	0	8

Group B	Skip	W	L
Canada	Pat Ryan	8	0
Sweden	Per Lindeman	7	1
Germany	Klaus Unterstab	6	2
Switzerland	Hugo Jäggi	5	3
Japan	Akinori Kashiwagi	4	4
Wales	Hugh Meikle	3	5
Russia	Aleksander Kolesnikov	2	6
Estonia	Leo Jakobson	1	7
Denmark	Johannes Jensen	0	8

=== Tiebreaker ===
- Scotland 6-5 Finland

=== Playoffs ===
Semi-final
United States	5
Sweden	6
Canada	7
Scotland	2

Final
Sweden	0
Canada	8
Bronze medal
United States	6
Scotland	4

== Women ==
=== Round-robin standings ===
Country	Skip	W	L
Canada	Diane Foster	7	2
Scotland	Kirsty Letton	6	3
Finland	Helena Timonen	6	3
Switzerland	Renate Nedkoff	6	3
United States	Pam Oleinik	6	3
Sweden	Ingrid Meldahl	5	4
Ireland	Fiona Turnbull	4	5
Japan	Eriko Igarashi	3	6
England	Glynnice Lauder	2	7
New Zealand	Liz Matthews	0	9

=== Tiebreaker ===
- Switzerland 6-5 United States

=== Playoffs ===
Semi-final
Canada	8
Switzerland	3
Scotland	5
Finland	4

Final
Canada	10
Scotland	2
Bronze medal
Switzerland	7
Finland	6
