= Ragnar Kamp =

Swedish-American curler

- Curler
- Born: April 9, 1953 (age 73)

Curling career
- Member Association: Sweden, Nova Scotia, United States
- Brier: 2 (1984, 1989)
- World Championship: 3 (1975, 1977, 1980)
- European Championship: 1 (1977)
Medal record
Men's Curling
Representing Sweden
World championships
| Gold medal – first place | 1977 Karlstad | Team |

J. Ragnar Kamp (born April 9, 1953) is a Swedish-American curler and World Champion. He won a gold medal at the 1977 World Curling Championships for Sweden. After winning the Worlds, Kamp threatened to move to Canada, complaining of Sweden's 'high taxes' and 'negative outlook'. After the 1980 World Championships, Kamp did move to Port Hawkesbury, Nova Scotia, and won two provincial championships, in 1984 and in 1989. He then moved to Ellsworth, Maine where he played in five U.S. national championships (2000, 2001, 2002, 2003, 2004).

In 1978 he was inducted into the Swedish Curling Hall of Fame.
