= Curt Jonsson =

Swedish curler

Curt Jonsson (24 October 1922 – 19 April 2021) was the third and skip on the Åredalens CK curling team (from Åre, Sweden) during the World Curling Championships (known as the Scotch Cup) 1963 and 1964 (Skip).

In 1966 he was inducted into the Swedish Curling Hall of Fame.
