= Stig Håkansson =

Swedish sprinter and long jumper

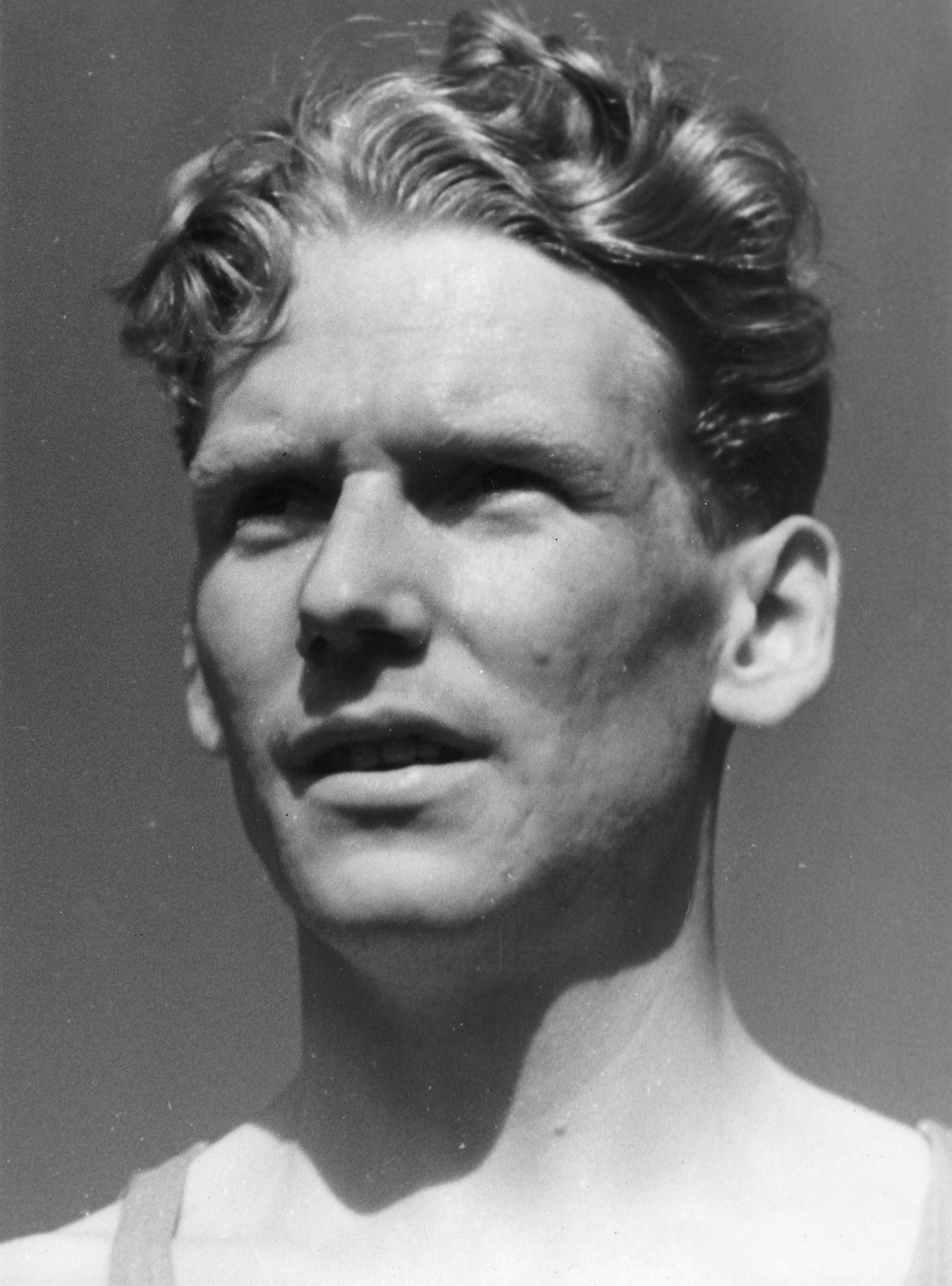

Personal information
- Born: 19 October 1918
- Died: 2000 (aged approximately 81)

Sport
- Sport: Athletics, Curling
- Event(s): 100 m, 200 m, long jump
- Club: IF Sleipner; IF Göta

Achievements and titles
- Personal best(s): 100 m – 10.6 (1944); 200 m – 21.9 (1944); LJ – 7.50 m (1944)
Medal record
Men's athletics
Representing Sweden
European Championships
Gold medal – first place	1946 Oslo	4×100 m

Stig Håkansson (19 October 1918 – 2000) was a Swedish sprinter and long jumper, who won a gold medal in the 4 × 100 m relay at the 1946 European Championships; he finished fifth in the individual 100 m and in the long jump. He won the national titles in the 100 m in 1944 and 1946 and in the long jump in 1939, 1944 and 1945.

He was also known as a curler: he was 1968 Swedish men's curling champion and played for Sweden at the 1968 World men's championship where Swedish team finished on 4th place. In 1986 he was inducted into the Swedish Curling Hall of Fame.
