= Kjell Oscarius =

Swedish curler

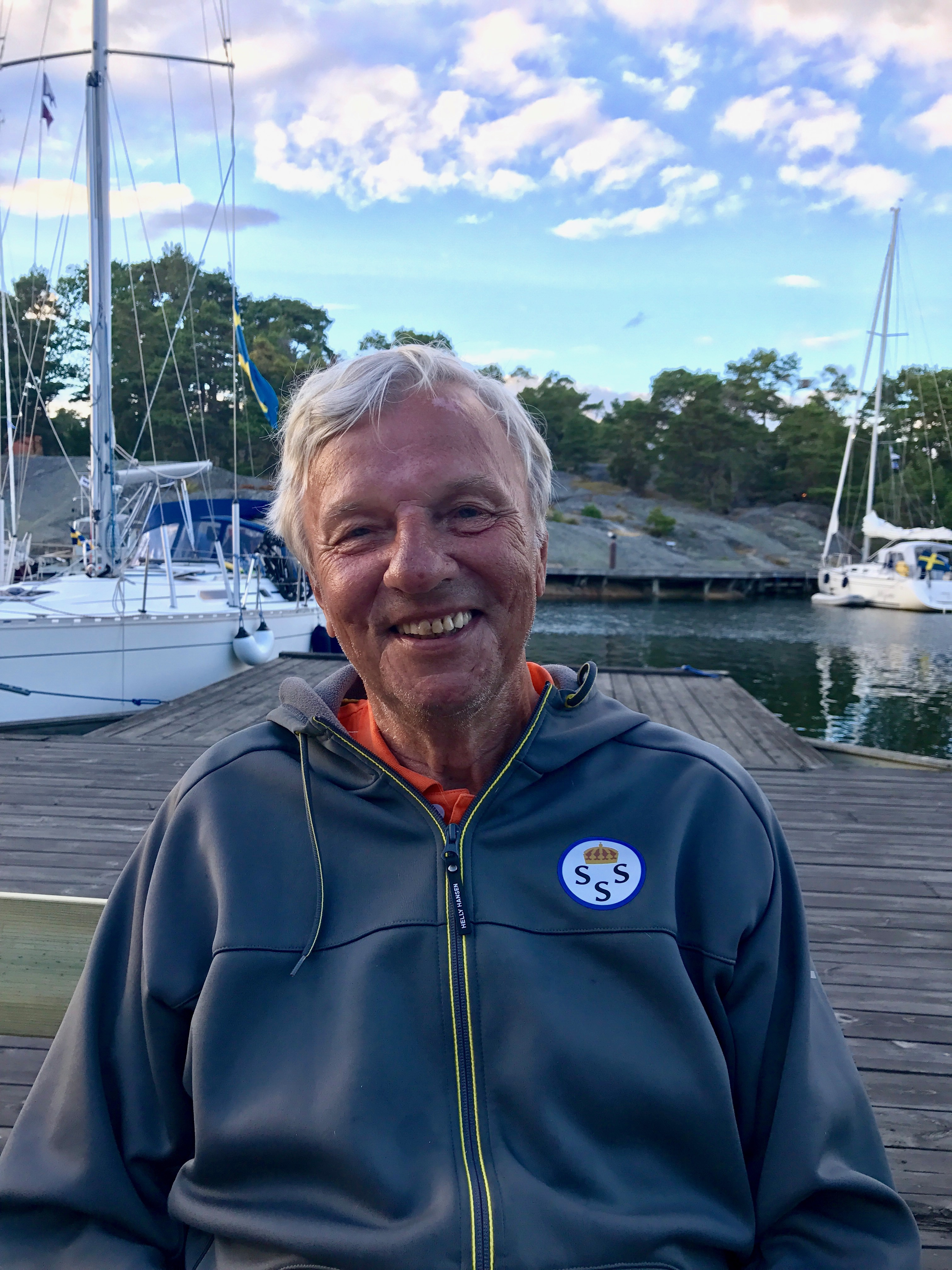
- Kjell Oscarius in August 2017

Personal information
- Nationality: Swedish
- Born: 1 May 1943 (age 83) Stockholm

Sport
- Sport: Curling
Medal record
Representing Sweden
Men's Curling
World championships
Gold medal – first place	1973 Regina	Team

Kjell Oscarius (born 1 May 1943 in Stockholm) is a Swedish curler and World Champion. He won a gold medal at the 1973 World Curling Championship.

In 1973 he was inducted into the Swedish Curling Hall of Fame.

== Personal life ==
Kjell's younger brother Bengt is also a curler and teammate.
