= Trevor Dodds (disambiguation) =

Trevor Dodds may refer to:

- Trevor Dodds (born 1959), Namibian professional golfer
- Trevor Dodds (curler), Scottish curler
- Trevor Dodds, a character in Doc Martin played by Richard McCabe
