= Robert Kelly (curler) =

Scottish male curler and coach

- Curler ♂
- Other names: Bob
- Born: 3 May 1955 (age 71)

Team
- Curling club: Carmunnock & Rutherglen CC, Glasgow, Carrington CC, Edinburgh, Dunkeld CC, Pitlochry, Inverness CC

Curling career
- Member Association: Scotland
- World Championship: 3 (1994, 1995, 2000)
- European Championship: 1 (2000)
- Olympic: 1 (1992) (demo)
- Other appearances: World Junior Championships: 1 (1976)
Medal record
Curling
World Championship
Silver medal – second place	1995 Brandon
Scottish Men's Championship
Gold medal – first place	1994
Gold medal – first place	1995
Gold medal – first place	2000
Silver medal – second place	1985

Robert "Bob" Kelly (born 3 May 1955) is a Scottish curler and curling coach from Edinburgh.

He is a 1995 World Men's silver medallist and three-time Scottish men's champion. He also participated as a member of Great Britain men's team at the 1992 Winter Olympics (where curling was a demonstration sport); the team finished in 5th place.

== Teams ==
=== Men's ===
Season	Skip	Third	Second	Lead	Alternate	Coach	Events
1975–76	Robert Kelly	Ken Horton	Willie Jamieson	Keith Douglas			SJCC 1976 (gold); WJCC 1976 (4th)
1991–92	Hammy McMillan	Norman Brown	Gordon Muirhead	Roger McIntyre	Robert Kelly		WOG 1992 (demo) (5th)
1993–94	Colin Hamilton	Bob Kelly	Vic Moran	Colin Barr	Trevor Dodds (WCC)		SMCC 1994 (gold); WCC 1994 (7th)
1994–95	Gordon Muirhead	Peter Loudon	Robert Kelly	Russell Keiller	Graeme Connal (WCC)		SMCC 1995 (gold); WCC 1995 (silver)
1996–97	Gordon Muirhead	Peter Loudon	Robert Kelly	Russell Keiller			
1999–00	Robert Kelly	Neil Hampton	Tom Pendreigh	Ross Hepburn	Gordon Muirhead (WCC)	Robin Copland	SMCC 2000 (gold); WCC 2000 (8th)
2003–04	Robert Kelly	Neil Hampton	Tom Pendreigh	Ross Hepburn			
2004–05	Robert Kelly	Neil Hampton	Tom Pendreigh	Ross Hepburn			SMCC 2005 (8th)
2009–10	Peter Loudon	Logan Gray	Richard Woods	Robert Kelly			

=== Mixed ===
Season	Skip	Third	Second	Lead	Events
1993	Colin Hamilton	Carol Ross	Bob Kelly	Catherine Dodds	SMxCC 1993 (silver)
1994	Colin Hamilton	Carol Ross	Bob Kelly	Catherine Dodds	SMxCC 1994 (gold)
1998	Bob Kelly	Gillian Barr	Colin Barr	Wendy Barr	SMxCC 1998 (silver)

== Record as a coach of national teams ==
Year	Tournament, event	National team	Place
2001	2001 World Junior Curling Championships	Scotland (junior men)	4
2002	2002 World Junior Curling Championships	Scotland (junior men)	3rd place, bronze medalist(s)
