= Ross Hepburn =

Scottish male curler

- Curler ♂
- Born: 1971 (age 54–55); Edinburgh, Scotland

Team
- Curling club: Inverness CC, Airleywight CC, Perth

Curling career
- Member Association: Scotland
- World Championship: 3 (2000, 2007, 2010)
Medal record
Curling
World Championships
Bronze medal – third place	2010 Cortina d'Ampezzo
Scottish Men's Championship
Gold medal – first place	2000
Gold medal – first place	2007
Gold medal – first place	2010
Silver medal – second place	2012
Bronze medal – third place	2011

Ross Hepburn (born 1972 in Edinburgh, Scotland) is a Scottish male curler.

He is a 2010 World Men's bronze medallist and three-time Scottish men's champion.

== Teams ==
Season	Skip	Third	Second	Lead	Alternate	Coach	Events
1996–97	Graeme Connal	I. Watt	D. Brown	Ross Hepburn			
1999–00	Robert Kelly	Neil Hampton	Tom Pendreigh	Ross Hepburn	Gordon Muirhead (WCC)	Robin Copland	SMCC 2000 (gold); WCC 2000 (8th)
2003–04	Robert Kelly	Neil Hampton	Tom Pendreigh	Ross Hepburn			
2004–05	Robert Kelly	Neil Hampton	Tom Pendreigh	Ross Hepburn			SMCC 2005 (8th)
2006–07	Warwick Smith	Craig Wilson	David Smith	Ross Hepburn	Ewan MacDonald (WCC)	John Dunn	SMCC 2007 (gold); WCC 2007 (9th)
2007–08	Warwick Smith	Craig Wilson	David Smith	Ross Hepburn			
2008–09	Warwick Smith	Craig Wilson	David Smith	Ross Hepburn			SMCC 2009 (6th)
2009–10	Warwick Smith (fourth)	David Smith (skip)	Craig Wilson	Ross Hepburn	David Murdoch (WCC)	Alan Smith	SMCC 2010 (gold); WCC 2010 (bronze)
2010–11	David Murdoch	Warwick Smith	Glen Muirhead	Ross Hepburn			SMCC 2011 (bronze)
2011–12	David Smith	Warwick Smith	Craig Wilson (season); Alan Smith (SMCC)	Ross Hepburn			SMCC 2012 (silver)
2012–13	Warwick Smith	David Smith	Alan Smith	Ross Hepburn			SMCC 2013 (4th)
2013–14	Warwick Smith (fourth)	David Smith (skip)	Sandy Reid	Ross Hepburn			SMCC 2014 (5th)
