= Yuki Inoue =

Yuki Inoue may refer to:

- Yuki Inoue (井上 由起, born 1970), better known as Satsuki Yukino, Japanese voice actress
- Yuki Inoue (curler) (井上 祐樹), Japanese curler
- Yuki Inoue (footballer) (井上 雄幾, born 1977), Japanese footballer
