= Vic Moran =

Scottish curler

- Curler ♂

Team
- Curling club: Carrington CC, Edinburgh

Curling career
- Member Association: Scotland
- World Championship: 1 (1994)
Medal record
Curling
Scottish Men's Championship
| Gold medal – first place | 1994 |

Vic Moran is a Scottish curler.

At the national level, he is a 1994 Scottish men's champion curler.

== Teams ==
| Season | Skip | Third | Second | Lead | Alternate | Events |
|---|---|---|---|---|---|---|
| 1993–94 | Colin Hamilton | Bob Kelly | Vic Moran | Colin Barr | Trevor Dodds (WCC) | SMCC 1994 (gold); WCC 1994 (7th) |
| 1994–95 | Colin Hamilton | Colin Barr | Vic Moran | Trevor Dodds | | |
