= 1987 Canadian Junior Curling Championships =

The 1987 Pepsi Canadian Junior Curling Championships were held January 31 to February 7, 1987 at the Prince Albert Golf and Curling Club in Prince Albert, Saskatchewan.

It was the first Canadian Junior championship to hold both the men's and women's events in conjunction with one another.

== Men's ==
=== Teams ===
Province / Territory	Skip	Third	Second	Lead
British Columbia	Brent Pierce	Ross Graham	Bryan Miki	Darin Fenton
Alberta	Trenton McQuarrie	Rod Kramer	Richard Kleibrink	Tim Krassman
Saskatchewan	Randy Bryden	Dean Klippenstine	Craig Fiske	Jamie Mathieson
Manitoba	Brent Braemer	Kyle Thompsett	Myles Riddell	Garth Smith
Ontario	Wayne Middaugh	Peter Corner	Dave Hannon	Todd Macklin
Quebec	Andrew MacKay	Luc Heroux	Michael Thompson	David Calderisi
New Brunswick	Jim Sullivan	Charlie Sullivan	Craig Burgess	Dan Alderman
Nova Scotia	Robert Smith	Jamie Myra	Richard Crouse	Kurt Lohnes
Prince Edward Island	James McCarthy	Daryell Nowlan	Paul Power	Ian Power
Newfoundland	Craig Piercey	Craig Dowden	Paul Carter	Troy Loder
Yukon/Northwest Territories	Chad Cowan	Jeff MacPheat	Danny Brown	Doug Bryant
Northern Ontario	Craig Kochan	Mike Desilets	Andy Davis	Craig Cordiner

=== Standings ===
Locale	Skip	W	L
New Brunswick	Jim Sullivan	9	2
British Columbia	Brent Pierce	7	4
Ontario	Wayne Middaugh	7	4
Alberta	Trenton McQuarrie	7	4
Saskatchewan	Randy Bryden	6	5
Manitoba	Brent Braemer	6	5
Northern Ontario	Craig Kochan	6	5
Nova Scotia	Robert Smith	4	7
Newfoundland	Craig Piercey	4	7
Yukon/Northwest Territories	Chad Cowan	4	7
Quebec	Andrew MacKay	3	8
Prince Edward Island	James McCarthy	3	8

=== Results ===
==== Draw 1 ====
Sheet A	1	2	3	4	5	6	7	8	9	10	Final
Manitoba (Braemer)	0	2	0	0	0	0	1	0	X	X	3
Saskatchewan (Bryden)	1	0	2	1	0	1	0	3	X	X	8

Sheet B	1	2	3	4	5	6	7	8	9	10	Final
Northern Ontario (Kochan)	0	0	1	0	2	0	0	1	0	X	4
Nova Scotia (Smith)	1	1	0	1	0	3	1	0	1	X	8

Sheet C	1	2	3	4	5	6	7	8	9	10	Final
Prince Edward Island (McCarthy)	0	1	0	0	2	0	2	0	1	0	6
Yukon/Northwest Territories (Cowan)	2	0	0	2	0	1	0	2	0	1	8

Sheet E	1	2	3	4	5	6	7	8	9	10	Final
Alberta (McQuarrie)	0	2	0	0	1	0	1	0	0	0	4
British Columbia (Pierce)	1	0	1	1	0	1	0	0	0	1	5

Sheet G	1	2	3	4	5	6	7	8	9	10	Final
Quebec (MacKay)	0	0	1	0	2	0	1	0	X	X	4
New Brunswick (Sullivan)	1	2	0	1	0	4	0	2	X	X	10

Sheet H	1	2	3	4	5	6	7	8	9	10	Final
Newfoundland (Piercey)	0	0	0	0	0	1	1	1	0	X	3
Ontario (Middaugh)	2	2	0	1	0	0	0	0	2	X	7

==== Draw 2 ====
Sheet A	1	2	3	4	5	6	7	8	9	10	Final
Yukon/Northwest Territories (Cowan)	2	0	2	0	1	0	3	0	1	X	9
Quebec (MacKay)	0	2	0	2	0	1	0	1	0	X	6

Sheet B	1	2	3	4	5	6	7	8	9	10	Final
Saskatchewan (Bryden)	0	1	0	1	1	0	0	2	0	0	5
Newfoundland (Piercey)	2	0	0	0	0	2	0	0	1	1	6

Sheet C	1	2	3	4	5	6	7	8	9	10	Final
New Brunswick (Sullivan)	2	1	0	0	4	0	0	1	X	X	8
Manitoba (Braemer)	0	0	1	1	0	0	1	0	X	X	3

Sheet D	1	2	3	4	5	6	7	8	9	10	Final
Alberta (McQuarrie)	0	2	1	0	1	0	1	0	2	0	7
Ontario (Middaugh)	1	0	0	2	0	2	0	2	0	1	8

==== Draw 3 ====
Sheet E	1	2	3	4	5	6	7	8	9	10	Final
Saskatchewan (Bryden)	0	0	0	0	0	1	0	0	X	X	1
New Brunswick (Sullivan)	1	1	1	1	2	0	0	1	X	X	7

Sheet F	1	2	3	4	5	6	7	8	9	10	Final
Manitoba (Braemer)	0	0	2	0	0	1	0	2	1	0	6
Quebec (MacKay)	1	0	0	1	2	0	1	0	0	2	7

Sheet G	1	2	3	4	5	6	7	8	9	10	Final
Nova Scotia (Smith)	0	0	0	2	0	0	0	2	0	2	6
Prince Edward Island (McCarthy)	2	1	1	0	0	0	1	0	0	0	5

Sheet H	1	2	3	4	5	6	7	8	9	10	Final
British Columbia (Pierce)	1	1	0	2	0	1	0	0	X	X	5
Northern Ontario (Kochan)	0	0	6	0	2	0	1	2	X	X	11

==== Draw 4 ====
Sheet A	1	2	3	4	5	6	7	8	9	10	Final
Northern Ontario (Kochan)	1	0	1	0	1	0	2	0	1	0	6
Alberta (McQuarrie)	0	1	0	2	0	1	0	1	0	2	7

Sheet B	1	2	3	4	5	6	7	8	9	10	11	Final
Ontario (Middaugh)	0	1	0	3	0	1	0	1	0	0	1	7
Prince Edward Island (McCarthy)	1	0	2	0	1	0	1	0	0	1	0	6

Sheet C	1	2	3	4	5	6	7	8	9	10	Final
Nova Scotia (Smith)	1	1	0	0	0	2	0	0	2	X	6
Yukon/Northwest Territories (Cowan)	0	0	1	0	0	0	1	1	0	X	3

Sheet D	1	2	3	4	5	6	7	8	9	10	Final
British Columbia (Pierce)	1	0	0	0	1	0	1	0	2	1	6
Newfoundland (Piercey)	0	0	1	0	0	1	0	2	0	0	4

==== Draw 5 ====
Sheet E	1	2	3	4	5	6	7	8	9	10	Final
Quebec (MacKay)	0	0	0	1	0	0	X	X	X	X	1
Saskatchewan (Bryden)	1	0	1	0	4	4	X	X	X	X	10

Sheet F	1	2	3	4	5	6	7	8	9	10	Final
British Columbia (Pierce)	0	0	0	1	0	1	1	1	0	1	5
Ontario (Middaugh)	0	0	1	0	1	0	0	0	2	0	4

Sheet G	1	2	3	4	5	6	7	8	9	10	11	Final
Prince Edward Island (McCarthy)	0	2	0	1	0	1	0	2	0	1	0	7
Northern Ontario (Kochan)	2	0	2	0	0	0	1	0	2	0	1	8

Sheet H	1	2	3	4	5	6	7	8	9	10	Final
Manitoba (Braemer)	0	2	0	1	1	0	3	X	X	X	7
Nova Scotia (Smith)	1	0	1	0	0	0	0	X	X	X	2

==== Draw 6 ====
Sheet A	1	2	3	4	5	6	7	8	9	10	Final
Nova Scotia (Smith)	0	1	0	1	0	0	0	1	X	X	3
British Columbia (Pierce)	2	0	1	0	2	1	1	0	X	X	7

Sheet B	1	2	3	4	5	6	7	8	9	10	Final
Alberta (McQuarrie)	0	1	1	1	0	0	0	1	0	2	6
Newfoundland (Piercey)	0	0	0	0	1	1	0	0	2	0	4

Sheet C	1	2	3	4	5	6	7	8	9	10	Final
Manitoba (Braemer)	1	0	1	0	0	2	0	2	0	1	7
Northern Ontario (Kochan)	0	1	0	0	1	0	2	0	2	0	6

Sheet D	1	2	3	4	5	6	7	8	9	10	Final
Yukon/Northwest Territories (Cowan)	0	1	0	1	0	0	1	1	0	X	4
New Brunswick (Sullivan)	0	0	3	0	2	2	0	0	1	X	8

==== Draw 7 ====
Sheet E	1	2	3	4	5	6	7	8	9	10	Final
Newfoundland (Piercey)	1	0	1	1	0	0	0	1	0	0	4
Yukon/Northwest Territories (Cowan)	0	1	0	0	3	0	1	0	1	1	7

Sheet F	1	2	3	4	5	6	7	8	9	10	Final
Quebec (MacKay)	0	1	0	0	1	0	0	0	1	X	3
Alberta (McQuarrie)	2	0	0	1	0	1	0	1	0	X	5

Sheet G	1	2	3	4	5	6	7	8	9	10	Final
Ontario (Middaugh)	0	3	0	2	3	0	0	0	0	1	9
Saskatchewan (Bryden)	1	0	1	0	0	2	1	1	2	0	8

Sheet H	1	2	3	4	5	6	7	8	9	10	Final
New Brunswick (Sullivan)	2	0	0	3	0	1	2	X	X	X	8
Prince Edward Island (McCarthy)	0	0	1	0	1	0	0	X	X	X	2

==== Draw 8 ====
Sheet A	1	2	3	4	5	6	7	8	9	10	Final
Newfoundland (Piercey)	0	2	0	1	0	0	1	0	1	X	5
Prince Edward Island (McCarthy)	2	0	2	0	1	0	0	1	0	X	6

Sheet B	1	2	3	4	5	6	7	8	9	10	Final
Quebec (MacKay)	0	2	1	1	0	2	0	0	0	0	6
British Columbia (Pierce)	3	0	0	0	4	0	0	0	0	1	8

Sheet C	1	2	3	4	5	6	7	8	9	10	Final
Alberta (McQuarrie)	0	0	1	0	0	1	1	0	1	X	4
New Brunswick (Sullivan)	0	1	0	2	3	0	0	2	0	X	8

Sheet D	1	2	3	4	5	6	7	8	9	10	Final
Northern Ontario (Kochan)	2	0	0	0	1	1	0	0	1	X	5
Yukon/Northwest Territories (Cowan)	0	0	0	1	0	0	0	1	0	X	2

==== Draw 9 ====
Sheet E	1	2	3	4	5	6	7	8	9	10	Final
Prince Edward Island (McCarthy)	0	2	0	1	0	2	0	0	0	0	5
Quebec (MacKay)	1	0	3	0	1	0	2	0	1	1	9

Sheet F	1	2	3	4	5	6	7	8	9	10	Final
Saskatchewan (Bryden)	0	1	0	0	3	2	2	1	X	X	9
Nova Scotia (Smith)	1	0	2	1	0	0	0	0	X	X	4

Sheet G	1	2	3	4	5	6	7	8	9	10	Final
Newfoundland (Piercey)	0	0	0	1	0	0	2	1	0	X	4
Manitoba (Braemer)	1	1	0	0	2	0	0	0	2	X	6

Sheet H	1	2	3	4	5	6	7	8	9	10	Final
Yukon/Northwest Territories (Cowan)	1	0	0	2	0	1	1	0	1	0	6
Ontario (Middaugh)	0	0	2	0	1	0	0	2	0	3	8

==== Draw 10 ====
Sheet A	1	2	3	4	5	6	7	8	9	10	11	12	Final
Ontario (Middaugh)	1	0	0	0	3	1	1	0	1	0	0	0	7
Manitoba (Braemer)	0	1	1	2	0	0	0	2	0	1	0	1	8

Sheet B	1	2	3	4	5	6	7	8	9	10	Final
Nova Scotia (Smith)	0	2	0	1	0	1	0	1	0	X	5
Alberta (McQuarrie)	2	0	2	0	1	0	3	0	0	X	8

Sheet C	1	2	3	4	5	6	7	8	9	10	Final
Northern Ontario (Kochan)	0	0	3	0	1	0	1	1	0	0	6
Saskatchewan (Bryden)	1	0	0	1	0	2	0	0	2	1	7

Sheet D	1	2	3	4	5	6	7	8	9	10	Final
New Brunswick (Sullivan)	0	0	2	0	2	0	0	4	X	X	8
British Columbia (Pierce)	1	0	0	1	0	0	2	0	X	X	4

==== Draw 11 ====
Sheet E	1	2	3	4	5	6	7	8	9	10	Final
Ontario (Middaugh)	1	0	0	0	3	0	1	0	0	X	5
Northern Ontario (Kochan)	0	1	1	1	0	1	0	2	1	X	7

Sheet F	1	2	3	4	5	6	7	8	9	10	Final
Manitoba (Braemer)	0	0	2	0	0	0	2	0	2	0	6
Prince Edward Island (McCarthy)	0	2	0	1	1	1	0	2	0	3	10

Sheet G	1	2	3	4	5	6	7	8	9	10	Final
New Brunswick (Sullivan)	0	0	1	1	0	0	1	2	2	X	7
Nova Scotia (Smith)	0	0	0	0	1	0	0	0	0	X	1

Sheet H	1	2	3	4	5	6	7	8	9	10	11	Final
Saskatchewan (Bryden)	0	0	0	3	1	0	0	0	0	1	0	5
Alberta (McQuarrie)	0	0	1	0	0	2	1	1	0	0	1	6

==== Draw 12 ====
Sheet A	1	2	3	4	5	6	7	8	9	10	11	Final
Alberta (McQuarrie)	0	0	0	0	0	1	0	1	2	0	2	6
Yukon/Northwest Territories (Cowan)	0	1	0	0	1	0	1	0	0	1	0	4

Sheet B	1	2	3	4	5	6	7	8	9	10	11	Final
New Brunswick (Sullivan)	0	0	1	0	1	0	0	1	1	1	1	6
Ontario (Middaugh)	0	0	0	3	0	2	0	0	0	0	0	5

Sheet C	1	2	3	4	5	6	7	8	9	10	Final
British Columbia (Pierce)	0	0	1	0	0	0	2	0	0	X	3
Prince Edward Island (McCarthy)	1	2	0	1	0	1	0	1	2	X	8

Sheet D	1	2	3	4	5	6	7	8	9	10	Final
Quebec (MacKay)	0	0	2	3	0	3	X	X	X	X	8
Newfoundland (Piercey)	0	1	0	0	1	0	X	X	X	X	2

==== Draw 13 ====
Sheet E	1	2	3	4	5	6	7	8	9	10	Final
Yukon/Northwest Territories (Cowan)	0	1	0	0	0	1	0	1	0	X	3
Manitoba (Braemer)	0	0	1	1	1	0	1	0	2	X	6

Sheet F	1	2	3	4	5	6	7	8	9	10	Final
Newfoundland (Piercey)	0	1	1	3	0	1	0	1	0	2	9
Northern Ontario (Kochan)	0	0	0	0	3	0	3	0	2	0	8

Sheet G	1	2	3	4	5	6	7	8	9	10	Final
British Columbia (Pierce)	0	0	2	0	0	0	3	0	1	X	6
Saskatchewan (Bryden)	1	0	0	2	1	2	0	3	0	X	9

Sheet H	1	2	3	4	5	6	7	8	9	10	Final
Quebec (MacKay)	0	1	2	0	1	0	0	0	2	X	6
Nova Scotia (Smith)	2	0	0	2	0	3	1	1	0	X	9

==== Draw 14 ====
Sheet A	1	2	3	4	5	6	7	8	9	10	Final
Prince Edward Island (McCarthy)	0	0	0	3	0	0	0	0	X	X	3
Saskatchewan (Bryden)	0	0	1	0	1	1	2	4	X	X	9

Sheet B	1	2	3	4	5	6	7	8	9	10	Final
Yukon/Northwest Territories (Cowan)	0	0	1	0	1	0	1	1	0	X	4
British Columbia (Pierce)	3	0	0	2	0	0	0	0	1	X	6

Sheet C	1	2	3	4	5	6	7	8	9	10	Final
Nova Scotia (Smith)	0	0	0	1	0	0	1	0	1	0	3
Newfoundland (Piercey)	1	1	0	0	0	2	0	1	0	1	6

Sheet D	1	2	3	4	5	6	7	8	9	10	Final
Northern Ontario (Kochan)	0	0	2	1	1	0	3	0	1	X	8
Quebec (MacKay)	1	1	0	0	0	1	0	1	0	X	4

==== Draw 15 ====
Sheet E	1	2	3	4	5	6	7	8	9	10	Final
Nova Scotia (Smith)	0	0	0	0	4	0	1	0	0	X	5
Ontario (Middaugh)	0	1	2	1	0	3	0	2	1	X	10

Sheet F	1	2	3	4	5	6	7	8	9	10	Final
Saskatchewan (Bryden)	0	0	0	0	2	0	2	1	0	0	5
Yukon/Northwest Territories (Cowan)	0	0	0	2	0	2	0	0	1	1	6

Sheet G	1	2	3	4	5	6	7	8	9	10	Final
Alberta (McQuarrie)	0	0	0	0	0	0	1	0	2	X	3
Manitoba (Braemer)	0	2	0	0	1	1	0	1	0	X	5

Sheet H	1	2	3	4	5	6	7	8	9	10	Final
Northern Ontario (Kochan)	0	0	0	0	2	1	0	0	1	2	6
New Brunswick (Sullivan)	0	0	1	1	0	0	0	0	0	0	2

==== Draw 16 ====
Sheet A	1	2	3	4	5	6	7	8	9	10	Final
New Brunswick (Sullivan)	0	0	0	1	0	1	0	0	2	0	4
Newfoundland (Piercey)	1	0	0	0	1	0	2	0	0	1	5

Sheet B	1	2	3	4	5	6	7	8	9	10	11	Final
Manitoba (Braemer)	0	0	0	0	1	0	0	1	0	2	0	4
British Columbia (Pierce)	0	2	0	0	0	0	1	0	1	0	1	5

Sheet C	1	2	3	4	5	6	7	8	9	10	Final
Ontario (Middaugh)	1	1	0	3	0	0	3	0	0	X	8
Quebec (MacKay)	0	0	1	0	1	0	0	1	0	X	3

Sheet D	1	2	3	4	5	6	7	8	9	10	Final
Prince Edward Island (McCarthy)	0	1	0	0	2	0	1	0	0	X	4
Alberta (McQuarrie)	1	0	0	2	0	2	0	0	2	X	7

=== Playoffs ===
Tiebreaker		Semifinal		Final
Alberta	5
Ontario	7	Ontario	6
		British Columbia	5
				Ontario	4
				New Brunswick	6

==== Tiebreaker ====
Sheet D	1	2	3	4	5	6	7	8	9	10	Final
Alberta (McQuarrie)	0	1	0	0	2	0	2	0	0	X	5
Ontario (Middaugh)	0	0	0	1	0	2	0	2	2	X	7

Player percentages
Alberta		Ontario	
Tim Krassman	89%	Todd Macklin	84%
Richard Kleibrink	88%	Dave Hannon	85%
Rod Kramer	86%	Peter Corner	84%
Trenton McQuarrie	70%	Wayne Middaugh	80%
Total	83%	Total	83%

==== Semifinal ====
Sheet E	1	2	3	4	5	6	7	8	9	10	11	Final
Ontario (Middaugh)	1	0	0	1	0	2	0	1	0	0	1	6
British Columbia (Pierce)	0	1	1	0	0	0	2	0	0	1	0	5

Player percentages
Ontario		British Columbia	
Todd Macklin	83%	Darin Fenton	82%
Dave Hannon	75%	Bryan Miki	83%
Peter Corner	75%	Ross Graham	80%
Wayne Middaugh	58%	Brent Pierce	76%
Total	73%	Total	80%

==== Final ====
Sheet D	1	2	3	4	5	6	7	8	9	10	Final
Ontario (Middaugh)	0	1	0	0	2	0	0	0	1	0	4
New Brunswick (Sullivan)	1	0	1	0	0	1	0	1	0	2	6

Player percentages
Ontario		New Brunswick	
Todd Macklin	60%	Dan Alderman	71%
Dave Hannon	88%	Craig Burgess	74%
Peter Corner	65%	Charlie Sullivan	71%
Wayne Middaugh	91%	Jim Sullivan	88%
Total	76%	Total	76%

== Women's ==
=== Teams ===
Province / Territory	Skip	Third	Second	Lead
British Columbia	Julie Sutton	Judith Wood	Susan Auty	Marla Geiger
Alberta	LaDawn Funk	Raylene Jones	Marcy Strong	Laurelle Funk
Saskatchewan	Heather Torrie	Sheila Calcutt	Heather Olsen	Keri-Lynn Haas
Manitoba	Karen Purdy	Jennifer Lamont	Janine Sigurdson	Jill Ursel
Ontario	Janet Omand	Audra Smith	Margaret Corey	Tracy Jackson
Quebec	Lesley Ryan	Diane Field	Deanna Beveridge	Tracy Knox
New Brunswick	Lisa Sullivan	Rupa Patel	Judith Barlow	Jennifer Cann
Nova Scotia	Helen Radford	Christina Falt	Lynn Smith	Tara Phillips
Prince Edward Island	Lori Robinson	Angela Roberts	Anne Dillon	Susan Dowling
Newfoundland	Marcie Cooper	Joanne Ryan	Samantha Casmey	Tracey Locke
Yukon/Northwest Territories	Michele Cowan	Dawn Moses	Lori Mould	Shawna Bingham

=== Standings ===
Locale	Skip	W	L
British Columbia	Julie Sutton	9	1
Manitoba	Karen Purdy	8	2
Ontario	Janet Omand	7	3
New Brunswick	Lisa Sullivan	5	5
Newfoundland	Marcie Cooper	5	5
Alberta	LaDawn Funk	5	5
Saskatchewan	Heather Torrie	5	5
Nova Scotia	Helen Radford	4	6
Prince Edward Island	Lori Robinson	3	7
Quebec	Lesley Ryan	3	7
Yukon/Northwest Territories	Michele Cowan	1	9

=== Results ===
==== Draw 1 ====
Sheet D	1	2	3	4	5	6	7	8	9	10	Final
Manitoba (Purdy)	0	0	0	0	0	1	0	2	0	0	3
British Columbia (Sutton)	0	0	0	1	1	0	1	0	0	1	4

Sheet F	1	2	3	4	5	6	7	8	9	10	Final
Newfoundland (Cooper)	0	1	1	0	1	0	3	1	0	X	7
Saskatchewan (Torrie)	1	0	0	2	0	1	0	0	1	X	5

==== Draw 2 ====
Sheet E	1	2	3	4	5	6	7	8	9	10	Final
New Brunswick (Sullivan)	1	1	0	2	3	0	0	2	X	X	9
Nova Scotia (Radford)	0	0	1	0	0	1	1	0	X	X	3

Sheet G	1	2	3	4	5	6	7	8	9	10	Final
Prince Edward Island (Robinson)	0	0	0	0	1	0	1	0	1	3	6
Alberta (Funk)	1	0	0	1	0	1	0	1	0	0	4

==== Draw 3 ====
Sheet A	1	2	3	4	5	6	7	8	9	10	Final
Quebec (Ryan)	0	0	0	0	1	2	0	1	0	0	4
Newfoundland (Cooper)	0	0	3	1	0	0	0	0	1	0	5

Sheet B	1	2	3	4	5	6	7	8	9	10	Final
Nova Scotia (Radford)	1	1	0	1	2	0	1	0	3	0	9
Yukon/Northwest Territories (Cowan)	0	0	1	0	0	1	0	1	0	1	4

Sheet C	1	2	3	4	5	6	7	8	9	10	Final
Saskatchewan (Torrie)	0	0	0	2	0	2	0	3	1	0	8
Manitoba (Purdy)	0	2	1	0	2	0	1	0	0	3	9

Sheet D	1	2	3	4	5	6	7	8	9	10	11	Final
Alberta (Funk)	0	1	0	2	0	0	3	0	2	0	2	10
Ontario (Omand)	0	0	1	0	1	1	0	3	0	2	0	8

==== Draw 4 ====
Sheet E	1	2	3	4	5	6	7	8	9	10	Final
Ontario (Omand)	1	0	1	2	1	0	1	1	0	X	7
Yukon/Northwest Territories (Cowan)	0	1	0	0	0	2	0	0	1	X	4

Sheet F	1	2	3	4	5	6	7	8	9	10	Final
British Columbia (Sutton)	0	2	0	1	0	1	0	1	1	X	6
Prince Edward Island (Robinson)	0	0	0	0	1	0	0	0	0	X	1

Sheet G	1	2	3	4	5	6	7	8	9	10	Final
Quebec (Ryan)	0	0	1	0	2	0	2	0	1	0	6
New Brunswick (Sullivan)	1	1	0	1	0	1	0	1	0	0	5

==== Draw 5 ====
Sheet A	1	2	3	4	5	6	7	8	9	10	11	Final
Saskatchewan (Torrie)	0	1	0	2	1	0	0	1	2	0	0	7
Ontario (Omand)	1	0	2	0	0	1	1	0	0	2	1	8

Sheet C	1	2	3	4	5	6	7	8	9	10	Final
Quebec (Ryan)	0	0	2	0	0	0	0	0	0	1	3
Alberta (Funk)	0	0	0	2	0	2	0	0	0	0	4

Sheet D	1	2	3	4	5	6	7	8	9	10	Final
Prince Edward Island (Robinson)	0	2	0	0	0	0	1	1	1	X	5
Yukon/Northwest Territories (Cowan)	1	0	1	3	1	1	0	0	0	X	7

==== Draw 6 ====
Sheet E	1	2	3	4	5	6	7	8	9	10	11	Final
Nova Scotia (Radford)	0	3	0	1	0	1	0	1	0	2	1	9
Prince Edward Island (Robinson)	1	0	1	0	3	0	1	0	2	0	0	8

Sheet F	1	2	3	4	5	6	7	8	9	10	Final
Manitoba (Purdy)	0	2	0	3	0	0	4	0	1	X	10
New Brunswick (Sullivan)	0	0	1	0	0	1	0	2	0	X	4

Sheet G	1	2	3	4	5	6	7	8	9	10	Final
Ontario (Omand)	0	0	0	1	0	0	0	1	0	1	3
British Columbia (Sutton)	1	1	1	0	1	1	1	0	0	0	6

Sheet H	1	2	3	4	5	6	7	8	9	10	Final
Yukon/Northwest Territories (Cowan)	0	1	0	0	0	0	0	X	X	X	1
Newfoundland (Cooper)	3	0	1	1	1	1	1	X	X	X	8

==== Draw 7 ====
Sheet A	1	2	3	4	5	6	7	8	9	10	Final
New Brunswick (Sullivan)	1	0	0	1	1	0	1	0	0	2	6
Newfoundland (Cooper)	0	1	0	0	0	2	0	1	1	0	5

Sheet B	1	2	3	4	5	6	7	8	9	10	Final
Alberta (Funk)	2	0	2	0	1	0	1	0	1	X	7
Manitoba (Purdy)	0	1	0	2	0	3	0	4	0	X	10

Sheet C	1	2	3	4	5	6	7	8	9	10	Final
British Columbia (Sutton)	1	3	0	1	0	3	0	0	1	X	9
Nova Scotia (Radford)	0	0	1	0	1	0	1	1	0	X	4

Sheet D	1	2	3	4	5	6	7	8	9	10	Final
Saskatchewan (Torrie)	3	0	1	1	3	0	0	2	0	X	10
Quebec (Ryan)	0	1	0	0	0	3	0	0	1	X	5

==== Draw 8 ====
Sheet E	1	2	3	4	5	6	7	8	9	10	Final
New Brunswick (Sullivan)	0	0	2	0	0	2	0	1	0	0	5
Ontario (Omand)	1	1	0	1	1	0	1	0	0	2	7

Sheet F	1	2	3	4	5	6	7	8	9	10	Final
Nova Scotia (Radford)	2	0	2	0	0	2	0	3	0	0	9
Saskatchewan (Torrie)	0	1	0	3	1	0	1	0	1	0	7

Sheet G	1	2	3	4	5	6	7	8	9	10	Final
Newfoundland (Cooper)	0	0	1	0	0	1	0	0	0	0	2
British Columbia (Sutton)	0	0	0	0	1	0	2	0	1	1	5

==== Draw 9 ====
Sheet A	1	2	3	4	5	6	7	8	9	10	Final
British Columbia (Sutton)	0	2	0	1	1	0	0	0	0	0	4
Quebec (Ryan)	0	0	0	0	0	1	1	1	0	0	3

Sheet B	1	2	3	4	5	6	7	8	9	10	Final
Prince Edward Island (Robinson)	2	0	1	0	1	0	0	1	0	0	5
New Brunswick (Sullivan)	0	1	0	1	0	1	1	0	1	1	6

Sheet C	1	2	3	4	5	6	7	8	9	10	11	Final
Newfoundland (Cooper)	1	0	1	0	0	0	1	0	1	1	1	6
Alberta (Funk)	0	1	0	1	1	1	0	1	0	0	0	5

Sheet D	1	2	3	4	5	6	7	8	9	10	Final
Manitoba (Purdy)	1	0	0	0	0	0	5	0	0	1	7
Yukon/Northwest Territories (Cowan)	0	1	0	1	1	0	0	0	1	0	4

==== Draw 10 ====
Sheet E	1	2	3	4	5	6	7	8	9	10	Final
Yukon/Northwest Territories (Cowan)	2	0	0	0	0	0	1	0	0	X	3
Quebec (Ryan)	0	1	0	1	0	1	0	3	1	X	7

Sheet F	1	2	3	4	5	6	7	8	9	10	Final
Ontario (Omand)	0	0	1	0	0	1	1	1	0	0	4
Manitoba (Purdy)	0	0	0	1	1	0	0	0	2	1	5

Sheet G	1	2	3	4	5	6	7	8	9	10	Final
Saskatchewan (Torrie)	0	0	2	1	0	2	0	1	0	X	6
Prince Edward Island (Robinson)	0	0	0	0	1	0	1	0	1	X	3

Sheet H	1	2	3	4	5	6	7	8	9	10	Final
Alberta (Funk)	0	2	1	2	3	0	2	0	X	X	10
Nova Scotia (Radford)	2	0	0	0	0	1	0	2	X	X	5

==== Draw 11 ====
Sheet A	1	2	3	4	5	6	7	8	9	10	Final
Manitoba (Purdy)	0	0	0	1	0	1	0	0	1	X	3
Prince Edward Island (Robinson)	0	0	0	0	0	0	0	1	0	X	1

Sheet B	1	2	3	4	5	6	7	8	9	10	Final
British Columbia (Sutton)	0	1	0	0	0	1	1	0	0	0	3
Saskatchewan (Torrie)	1	0	0	0	1	0	0	2	1	1	6

Sheet C	1	2	3	4	5	6	7	8	9	10	Final
New Brunswick (Sullivan)	0	0	3	0	1	0	1	1	2	X	8
Yukon/Northwest Territories (Cowan)	1	1	0	1	0	1	0	0	0	X	4

Sheet D	1	2	3	4	5	6	7	8	9	10	11	Final
Quebec (Ryan)	0	2	0	0	0	0	1	1	0	1	1	6
Nova Scotia (Radford)	1	0	1	0	2	0	0	0	1	0	0	5

==== Draw 12 ====
Sheet F	1	2	3	4	5	6	7	8	9	10	Final
Nova Scotia (Radford)	2	0	3	1	0	0	0	5	0	X	11
Newfoundland (Cooper)	0	1	0	0	1	1	2	0	2	X	7

Sheet G	1	2	3	4	5	6	7	8	9	10	Final
Saskatchewan (Torrie)	0	0	0	1	0	2	0	1	0	X	4
Alberta (Funk)	1	1	0	0	3	0	1	0	2	X	8

Sheet H	1	2	3	4	5	6	7	8	9	10	Final
Ontario (Omand)	0	2	0	1	0	0	1	1	0	2	7
Prince Edward Island (Robinson)	0	0	1	0	2	1	0	0	2	0	6

==== Draw 13 ====
Sheet A	1	2	3	4	5	6	7	8	9	10	Final
Yukon/Northwest Territories (Cowan)	0	2	1	0	1	1	0	0	1	0	6
British Columbia (Sutton)	1	0	0	2	0	0	0	3	0	1	7

Sheet B	1	2	3	4	5	6	7	8	9	10	Final
Newfoundland (Cooper)	0	0	0	0	0	0	X	X	X	X	0
Ontario (Omand)	2	2	1	1	2	1	X	X	X	X	9

Sheet C	1	2	3	4	5	6	7	8	9	10	Final
Quebec (Ryan)	0	0	2	0	0	0	1	0	X	X	3
Manitoba (Purdy)	1	3	0	3	2	0	0	1	X	X	10

Sheet D	1	2	3	4	5	6	7	8	9	10	Final
Alberta (Funk)	0	1	0	0	1	0	0	3	0	0	5
New Brunswick (Sullivan)	1	0	0	2	0	0	2	0	0	1	6

==== Draw 14 ====
Sheet E	1	2	3	4	5	6	7	8	9	10	Final
Newfoundland (Cooper)	0	0	0	1	2	1	1	0	1	X	6
Manitoba (Purdy)	1	1	0	0	0	0	0	1	0	X	3

Sheet F	1	2	3	4	5	6	7	8	9	10	11	Final
Yukon/Northwest Territories (Cowan)	0	2	0	0	1	1	1	0	3	1	0	9
Alberta (Funk)	3	0	3	1	0	0	0	2	0	0	4	13

Sheet H	1	2	3	4	5	6	7	8	9	10	Final
Ontario (Omand)	1	1	0	2	0	1	1	0	0	X	6
Quebec (Ryan)	0	0	1	0	1	0	0	1	1	X	4

==== Draw 15 ====
Sheet A	1	2	3	4	5	6	7	8	9	10	Final
Manitoba (Purdy)	0	2	0	2	0	0	3	0	1	0	8
Nova Scotia (Radford)	0	0	1	0	2	0	0	2	0	1	6

Sheet B	1	2	3	4	5	6	7	8	9	10	Final
Prince Edward Island (Robinson)	0	1	1	0	2	0	0	1	0	0	5
Quebec (Ryan)	2	0	0	0	0	1	0	0	1	0	4

Sheet C	1	2	3	4	5	6	7	8	9	10	Final
Yukon/Northwest Territories (Cowan)	1	0	1	0	0	0	X	X	X	X	2
Saskatchewan (Torrie)	0	6	0	2	1	2	X	X	X	X	11

Sheet D	1	2	3	4	5	6	7	8	9	10	Final
British Columbia (Sutton)	0	1	0	0	0	1	0	2	0	4	8
New Brunswick (Sullivan)	1	0	0	0	1	0	1	0	2	0	5

==== Draw 16 ====
Sheet E	1	2	3	4	5	6	7	8	9	10	Final
Alberta (Funk)	0	0	2	0	0	0	0	0	0	X	2
British Columbia (Sutton)	0	2	0	0	0	0	1	1	1	X	5

Sheet F	1	2	3	4	5	6	7	8	9	10	Final
Prince Edward Island (Robinson)	0	1	0	0	0	1	1	0	2	3	8
Newfoundland (Cooper)	0	0	4	1	1	0	0	1	0	0	7

Sheet G	1	2	3	4	5	6	7	8	9	10	Final
Nova Scotia (Radford)	0	0	0	1	2	0	0	2	X	X	5
Ontario (Omand)	1	5	3	0	0	2	2	0	X	X	13

Sheet H	1	2	3	4	5	6	7	8	9	10	Final
New Brunswick (Sullivan)	0	0	0	1	0	0	0	1	0	X	2
Saskatchewan (Torrie)	0	2	1	0	0	1	0	0	3	X	7

=== Playoffs ===
Semifinal		Final
Manitoba	5
Ontario	4	Manitoba	4
		British Columbia	5

==== Semifinal ====
Sheet D	1	2	3	4	5	6	7	8	9	10	11	Final
Manitoba (Purdy)	0	0	0	1	1	0	0	0	2	0	1	5
Ontario (Omand)	0	0	1	0	0	2	0	0	0	1	0	4

Player percentages
Manitoba		Ontario	
Jill Ursel	73%	Tracy Jackson	66%
Janine Sigurdson	77%	Margaret Corey	70%
Jennifer Lamont	73%	Audra Smith	69%
Karen Purdy	85%	Janet Omand	74%
Total	77%	Total	70%

==== Final ====
Sheet E	1	2	3	4	5	6	7	8	9	10	Final
Manitoba (Purdy)	0	0	1	0	2	0	0	0	1	0	4
British Columbia (Sutton)	0	1	0	1	0	2	0	0	0	1	5

Player percentages
Manitoba		British Columbia	
Jill Ursel	79%	Marla Geiger	75%
Janine Sigurdson	81%	Susan Auty	65%
Jennifer Lamont	70%	Judith Wood	78%
Karen Purdy	74%	Julie Sutton	71%
Total	76%	Total	72%
