= David Ramsay (curler) =

Scottish curler and coach

- Curler ♂
- Born: 14 April 1957 (age 69); Edinburgh, Scotland

Team
- Curling club: Carrington CC, Edinburgh

Curling career
- Member Association: Scotland
- World Championship: 2 (1981, 1982)
- European Championship: 1 (1981)
- Other appearances: World Junior Championships: 1 (1978)
Medal record
Curling
World Junior Championships
Bronze medal – third place	1978 Grindelwald
Scottish Men's Championship
Gold medal – first place	1981
Gold medal – first place	1982

David Ramsay (born 14 April 1957 in Edinburgh, Scotland) is a Scottish curler and curling coach.

At the national level, he is a two-time Scottish men's champion curler (1981, 1982) and a 1978 Scottish junior champion curler.

At the international level, he is a 1978 World Junior Championships bronze medallist. He also was the coach of the women's team who won Latvia's first ever European Curling Championship medals at the 2026 European Curling Championships.

== Awards ==
- WJCC All-Star Team, Men: 1978

== Teams ==
Season	Skip	Third	Second	Lead	Coach	Events
1977–78	Colin Hamilton	Douglas Edwardson	Trevor Dodds	David Ramsay		SJCC 1978 (gold); WJCC 1978 (bronze)
1980–81	Colin Hamilton	W. Michael Dick	David Ramsay	Richard Pretsel		SMCC 1981 (gold); WCC 1981 (6th)
1981–82	Colin Hamilton	David Ramsay	W. Michael Dick	Richard Pretsel	Chuck Hay (WCC)	ECC 1981 (7th); SMCC 1982 (gold); WCC 1982 (7th)
2000–01	Colin Hamilton	John Hamilton	David Ramsay	Colin Campbell		
2001–02	Colin Hamilton	Brian Binnie	David Ramsay	Gordon Clark		
2006–07	Colin Hamilton	W. Michael Dick	David Ramsay	Trevor Dodds		SMCC 2007 (8th)
2008–09	Colin Hamilton	W. Michael Dick	Sean Murphy	David Ramsay		

== Record as a coach of national teams ==
Year	Tournament, event	National team	Place
2009	2009 Winter Universiade	United Kingdom (students men)	7
2011	2011 European Curling Championships	Scotland (men)	5
2013	2013 World Junior Curling Championships	Scotland (junior men)	1st place, gold medalist(s)
2013	2013 Winter Universiade	United Kingdom (students men)	2nd place, silver medalist(s)
2014	2014 World Junior Curling Championships	Scotland (junior men)	2nd place, silver medalist(s)
2015	2015 Winter Universiade	United Kingdom (students men)	3rd place, bronze medalist(s)
2019	2019 World Mixed Curling Championship	Scotland (mixed team)	5
2021	2021 World Mixed Doubles Curling Championship	England (mixed double)	14
2022	2022 World Mixed Doubles Curling Championship	England (mixed double)	16
2024	2024 European Curling Championships	England (men)	10
2026	2026 European Curling Championships	Latvia (women)	3rd place, bronze medalist(s)
