= 1998 Labatt Brier =

- Host city: Winnipeg, Manitoba
- Arena: Winnipeg Arena
- Dates: March 8–15
- Winner: Ontario
- Curling club: St. George's G&CC, Toronto
- Skip: Wayne Middaugh
- Third: Graeme McCarrel
- Second: Ian Tetley
- Lead: Scott Bailey
- Alternate: David Carruthers
- Finalist: Quebec (Guy Hemmings)

The 1998 Labatt Brier was held from March 8 to 15 at the Winnipeg Arena in Winnipeg, Manitoba. Wayne Middaugh of Ontario won his second Brier and his first as a skip after he defeated Guy Hemmings of Quebec in the final.

== Teams ==
Alberta	British Columbia	Manitoba
Granite CC, Edmonton Skip: Tom Reed; Third: Warren Kushnir; Second: Larry Gardeski; Lead: Garry Landry; Alternate: Doug Hardy	Royal City CC, New Westminster Skip: Greg McAulay; Third: Brent Pierce; Second: Bryan Miki; Lead: Darin Fenton; Alternate: Cary Sakiyama	Granite CC, Winnipeg Skip: Dale Duguid; Third: James Kirkness; Second: Jim Spencer; Lead: Doug Armstrong; Alternate: Barry Fry
New Brunswick	Newfoundland and Labrador	Northern Ontario
Moncton CA, Moncton Skip: Terry Odishaw; Third: Tommy Sullivan; Second: Mark Dobson; Lead: Kevin Keefe; Alternate: Roger Nason	Bally Haly G&CC, St. John's Skip: Toby McDonald; Third: Wayne Hamilton; Second: Lloyd Powell; Lead: Paul Withers; Alternate: Wayne Young	Port Arthur CC, Thunder Bay Fourth: Rob Sinclair; Skip: Bruce Melville; Second: Dale Wiersema; Lead: Larry Rathje; Alternate: Ernie Surkan
Nova Scotia	Ontario	Prince Edward Island
Mayflower CC, Halifax Skip: Paul Flemming; Third: Glen MacLeod; Second: Andy Dauphinee; Lead: Tom Fetterly; Alternate: David Noftall	St. George's G&CC, Toronto Skip: Wayne Middaugh; Third: Graeme McCarrel; Second: Ian Tetley; Lead: Scott Bailey; Alternate: David Carruthers	Charlottetown CC, Charlottetown Skip: Garth Mitchell; Third: Ken McGregor; Second: Phillip McInnis; Lead: Brad Chugg; Alternate: Kevin Champion
Quebec	Saskatchewan	Northwest Territories/Yukon
CC Saint-Lambert & Tracy, Saint-Lambert Skip: Guy Hemmings; Third: Pierre Charette; Second: Guy Thibaudeau; Lead: Dale Ness; Alternate: Dwayne Fowler	Hillcrest CC, Moose Jaw Skip: Rod Montgomery; Third: Glen Despins; Second: Dwayne Mihalicz; Lead: Jeff Tait; Alternate: Brian McCusker	Yellowknife CC, Yellowknife Skip: Trevor Alexander; Third: Klaus Schoenne; Second: Brad Chorostkowski; Lead: Mark Whitehead; Alternate: Scott Alexander

== Map of teams ==
Provincial Winners

== Round-robin standings ==
Key
Teams to Playoffs
Teams to Tiebreaker

Province	Skip	W	L
Ontario	Wayne Middaugh	10	1
Quebec	Guy Hemmings	8	3
Manitoba	Dale Duguid	7	4
Saskatchewan	Rod Montgomery	7	4
British Columbia	Greg McAulay	7	4
Northern Ontario	Bruce Melville	6	5
Nova Scotia	Paul Flemming	5	6
Alberta	Tom Reed	5	6
Newfoundland	Toby McDonald	4	7
New Brunswick	Terry Odishaw	4	7
Prince Edward Island	Garth Mitchell	2	9
Northwest Territories/Yukon	Trevor Alexander	1	10

== Round-robin results ==
=== Draw 1 ===
Sheet A	1	2	3	4	5	6	7	8	9	10	Final
Newfoundland (McDonald) 🔨	1	0	0	0	0	0	0	1	0	X	2
New Brunswick (Odishaw)	0	0	2	1	1	3	0	0	1	X	8

Sheet B	1	2	3	4	5	6	7	8	9	10	Final
British Columbia (McAulay)	0	0	2	0	1	0	0	3	0	0	6
Manitoba (Duguid) 🔨	0	1	0	2	0	2	1	0	0	1	7

Sheet C	1	2	3	4	5	6	7	8	9	10	Final
Prince Edward Island (Mitchell) 🔨	0	2	0	0	0	0	1	0	X	X	3
Nova Scotia (Flemming)	3	0	1	0	1	1	0	3	X	X	9

Sheet D	1	2	3	4	5	6	7	8	9	10	Final
Saskatchewan (Montgomery)	0	1	0	1	0	2	1	0	0	0	5
Northern Ontario (Melville) 🔨	0	0	2	0	2	0	0	1	1	1	7

=== Draw 2 ===
Sheet A	1	2	3	4	5	6	7	8	9	10	Final
Nova Scotia (Flemming) 🔨	0	0	3	0	2	0	0	0	1	0	6
British Columbia (McAulay)	0	1	0	2	0	1	1	1	0	2	8

Sheet B	1	2	3	4	5	6	7	8	9	10	Final
Ontario (Middaugh)	3	0	3	0	0	4	0	X	X	X	10
Quebec (Hemmings) 🔨	0	2	0	2	0	0	1	X	X	X	5

Sheet C	1	2	3	4	5	6	7	8	9	10	Final
Alberta (Reed)	1	1	0	2	1	0	1	0	0	0	6
Northwest Territories/Yukon (Alexander) 🔨	0	0	1	0	0	2	0	2	0	0	5

Sheet D	1	2	3	4	5	6	7	8	9	10	Final
Manitoba (Duguid) 🔨	1	0	3	0	1	0	1	0	2	X	8
Newfoundland (McDonald)	0	1	0	0	0	0	0	1	0	X	2

=== Draw 3 ===
Sheet B	1	2	3	4	5	6	7	8	9	10	Final
Newfoundland (McDonald) 🔨	2	0	0	1	0	0	0	1	0	X	4
Alberta (Reed)	0	0	1	0	3	0	2	0	3	X	9

Sheet C	1	2	3	4	5	6	7	8	9	10	Final
Quebec (Hemmings) 🔨	1	1	1	0	0	2	0	2	0	1	8
Saskatchewan (Montgomery)	0	0	0	0	3	0	2	0	1	0	6

=== Draw 4 ===
Sheet A	1	2	3	4	5	6	7	8	9	10	Final
Northern Ontario (Melville) 🔨	0	0	1	0	1	0	1	1	3	X	7
Prince Edward Island (Mitchell)	0	1	0	0	0	1	0	0	0	X	2

Sheet B	1	2	3	4	5	6	7	8	9	10	Final
Northwest Territories/Yukon (Alexander) 🔨	1	0	1	0	0	1	0	0	1	X	4
Ontario (Middaugh)	0	2	0	2	0	0	3	0	0	X	7

Sheet C	1	2	3	4	5	6	7	8	9	10	Final
British Columbia (McAulay) 🔨	3	0	3	0	0	0	1	2	X	X	9
New Brunswick (Odishaw)	0	3	0	1	0	0	0	0	X	X	4

Sheet D	1	2	3	4	5	6	7	8	9	10	11	Final
Alberta (Reed) 🔨	0	0	1	0	0	0	1	2	0	2	0	6
Quebec (Hemmings)	0	0	0	2	2	0	0	0	2	0	1	7

=== Draw 5 ===
Sheet A	1	2	3	4	5	6	7	8	9	10	Final
New Brunswick (Odishaw) 🔨	0	0	0	0	3	0	0	2	0	0	5
Northwest Territories/Yukon (Alexander)	0	0	0	0	0	0	2	0	1	1	4

Sheet B	1	2	3	4	5	6	7	8	9	10	Final
Saskatchewan (Montgomery) 🔨	0	0	0	2	0	3	0	2	0	1	8
Nova Scotia (Flemming)	0	0	1	0	2	0	2	0	1	0	6

Sheet C	1	2	3	4	5	6	7	8	9	10	Final
Ontario (Middaugh) 🔨	2	1	0	4	0	1	0	X	X	X	8
Northern Ontario (Melville)	0	0	1	0	0	0	1	X	X	X	2

Sheet D	1	2	3	4	5	6	7	8	9	10	Final
Prince Edward Island (Mitchell) 🔨	0	0	0	0	0	0	X	X	X	X	0
Manitoba (Duguid)	0	2	1	2	2	1	X	X	X	X	8

=== Draw 6 ===
Sheet A	1	2	3	4	5	6	7	8	9	10	Final
Ontario (Middaugh) 🔨	3	1	0	2	2	0	0	2	X	X	10
Nova Scotia (Flemming)	0	0	2	0	0	0	1	0	X	X	3

Sheet B	1	2	3	4	5	6	7	8	9	10	Final
Prince Edward Island (Mitchell) 🔨	2	0	0	0	2	0	2	0	1	X	7
New Brunswick (Odishaw)	0	0	1	1	0	1	0	2	0	X	5

Sheet C	1	2	3	4	5	6	7	8	9	10	Final
Manitoba (Duguid) 🔨	1	0	0	0	2	0	0	1	1	2	7
Northwest Territories/Yukon (Alexander)	0	0	2	0	0	0	1	0	0	0	3

Sheet D	1	2	3	4	5	6	7	8	9	10	11	Final
Northern Ontario (Melville) 🔨	1	0	2	1	0	0	1	0	0	1	0	6
British Columbia (McAulay)	0	1	0	0	1	1	0	0	3	0	3	9

=== Draw 7 ===
Sheet A	1	2	3	4	5	6	7	8	9	10	11	Final
British Columbia (McAulay) 🔨	0	2	0	0	0	0	1	0	1	1	1	6
Alberta (Reed)	2	0	1	0	0	0	0	2	0	0	0	5

Sheet B	1	2	3	4	5	6	7	8	9	10	Final
New Brunswick (Odishaw) 🔨	0	2	1	0	0	1	0	3	1	X	8
Quebec (Hemmings)	2	0	0	0	0	0	2	0	0	X	4

Sheet C	1	2	3	4	5	6	7	8	9	10	Final
Saskatchewan (Montgomery) 🔨	1	0	1	0	3	0	1	0	1	0	7
Manitoba (Duguid)	0	1	0	1	0	2	0	3	0	1	8

Sheet D	1	2	3	4	5	6	7	8	9	10	Final
Nova Scotia (Flemming) 🔨	0	2	0	1	1	0	2	0	0	1	7
Newfoundland (McDonald)	1	0	2	0	0	1	0	1	1	0	6

=== Draw 8 ===
Sheet A	1	2	3	4	5	6	7	8	9	10	Final
Northwest Territories/Yukon (Alexander) 🔨	0	1	0	0	0	1	X	X	X	X	2
Saskatchewan (Montgomery)	1	0	1	1	4	0	X	X	X	X	7

Sheet B	1	2	3	4	5	6	7	8	9	10	Final
Alberta (Reed) 🔨	2	0	0	2	0	0	0	2	0	0	6
Northern Ontario (Melville)	0	1	1	0	2	0	2	0	2	1	9

Sheet C	1	2	3	4	5	6	7	8	9	10	Final
Quebec (Hemmings) 🔨	0	3	1	0	0	2	0	4	X	X	10
Prince Edward Island (Mitchell)	1	0	0	1	1	0	2	0	X	X	5

Sheet D	1	2	3	4	5	6	7	8	9	10	Final
Newfoundland (McDonald) 🔨	0	2	0	0	0	0	2	0	1	X	5
Ontario (Middaugh)	1	0	2	1	0	1	0	3	0	X	8

=== Draw 9 ===
Sheet A	1	2	3	4	5	6	7	8	9	10	Final
Manitoba (Duguid) 🔨	0	1	0	0	2	0	1	0	2	0	6
Quebec (Hemmings)	1	0	1	1	0	1	0	2	0	2	8

Sheet B	1	2	3	4	5	6	7	8	9	10	Final
Saskatchewan (Montgomery) 🔨	0	2	1	0	2	0	2	2	0	X	9
New Brunswick (Odishaw)	1	0	0	1	0	3	0	0	1	X	6

Sheet C	1	2	3	4	5	6	7	8	9	10	Final
Alberta (Reed) 🔨	0	0	1	1	0	2	0	5	X	X	9
Nova Scotia (Flemming)	0	0	0	0	1	0	1	0	X	X	2

Sheet D	1	2	3	4	5	6	7	8	9	10	Final
Northwest Territories/Yukon (Alexander) 🔨	0	1	0	1	0	3	0	0	3	0	8
Prince Edward Island (Mitchell)	0	0	1	0	3	0	2	1	0	3	10

=== Draw 10 ===
Sheet A	1	2	3	4	5	6	7	8	9	10	11	Final
Prince Edward Island (Mitchell) 🔨	0	2	0	2	0	1	0	1	1	0	0	7
Alberta (Reed)	0	0	1	0	1	0	3	0	0	2	1	8

Sheet B	1	2	3	4	5	6	7	8	9	10	Final
Nova Scotia (Flemming) 🔨	0	1	1	2	0	0	1	0	X	X	5
Northwest Territories/Yukon (Alexander)	0	0	0	0	1	0	0	1	X	X	2

Sheet C	1	2	3	4	5	6	7	8	9	10	Final
Northern Ontario (Melville) 🔨	2	0	2	0	0	1	1	0	1	0	7
Newfoundland (McDonald)	0	1	0	3	1	0	0	2	0	1	8

Sheet D	1	2	3	4	5	6	7	8	9	10	11	Final
British Columbia (McAulay) 🔨	2	0	1	1	0	0	0	1	0	0	1	6
Ontario (Middaugh)	0	1	0	0	1	1	1	0	0	1	0	5

=== Draw 11 ===
Sheet A	1	2	3	4	5	6	7	8	9	10	Final
Ontario (Middaugh) 🔨	1	3	0	5	0	0	1	X	X	X	10
Manitoba (Duguid)	0	0	3	0	0	2	0	X	X	X	5

Sheet B	1	2	3	4	5	6	7	8	9	10	Final
Quebec (Hemmings) 🔨	0	0	2	0	0	1	0	2	0	X	5
British Columbia (McAulay)	0	2	0	0	2	0	3	0	1	X	8

Sheet C	1	2	3	4	5	6	7	8	9	10	Final
New Brunswick (Odishaw) 🔨	2	0	1	0	1	0	0	0	X	X	4
Northern Ontario (Melville)	0	0	0	2	0	3	4	1	X	X	10

Sheet D	1	2	3	4	5	6	7	8	9	10	Final
Newfoundland (McDonald) 🔨	1	0	0	1	0	1	0	0	X	X	3
Saskatchewan (Montgomery)	0	2	2	0	2	0	0	3	X	X	9

=== Draw 12 ===
Sheet A	1	2	3	4	5	6	7	8	9	10	Final
Quebec (Hemmings) 🔨	3	2	1	0	0	4	X	X	X	X	10
Newfoundland (McDonald)	0	0	0	0	1	0	X	X	X	X	1

Sheet B	1	2	3	4	5	6	7	8	9	10	Final
Manitoba (Duguid) 🔨	0	0	0	1	0	2	0	0	0	X	3
Northern Ontario (Melville)	0	1	1	0	1	0	2	2	0	X	7

Sheet C	1	2	3	4	5	6	7	8	9	10	Final
Northwest Territories/Yukon (Alexander) 🔨	2	0	0	0	2	0	1	1	1	X	7
British Columbia (McAulay)	0	1	1	1	0	1	0	0	0	X	4

Sheet D	1	2	3	4	5	6	7	8	9	10	Final
Ontario (Middaugh) 🔨	2	0	2	0	2	2	0	1	1	X	10
New Brunswick (Odishaw)	0	1	0	3	0	0	1	0	0	X	5

=== Draw 13 ===
Sheet A	1	2	3	4	5	6	7	8	9	10	11	Final
Saskatchewan (Montgomery) 🔨	0	1	1	1	0	2	0	2	0	0	1	8
Alberta (Reed)	0	0	0	0	2	0	3	0	0	2	0	7

Sheet B	1	2	3	4	5	6	7	8	9	10	Final
Prince Edward Island (Mitchell) 🔨	0	0	0	0	1	0	1	0	X	X	2
Ontario (Middaugh)	2	0	1	3	0	1	0	1	X	X	8

Sheet C	1	2	3	4	5	6	7	8	9	10	Final
Nova Scotia (Flemming) 🔨	0	0	1	0	0	1	0	0	X	X	2
Quebec (Hemmings)	0	1	0	2	2	0	2	1	X	X	8

Sheet D	1	2	3	4	5	6	7	8	9	10	Final
Northern Ontario (Melville) 🔨	2	3	0	3	0	X	X	X	X	X	8
Northwest Territories/Yukon (Alexander)	0	0	1	0	1	0	X	X	X	X	2

=== Draw 14 ===
Sheet A	1	2	3	4	5	6	7	8	9	10	Final
British Columbia (McAulay) 🔨	1	0	0	1	0	1	0	1	0	X	4
Saskatchewan (Montgomery)	0	2	1	0	1	0	2	0	4	X	10

Sheet B	1	2	3	4	5	6	7	8	9	10	Final
Alberta (Reed) 🔨	1	0	1	0	0	0	1	0	1	0	4
Manitoba (Duguid)	0	1	0	0	1	1	0	1	0	3	7

Sheet C	1	2	3	4	5	6	7	8	9	10	Final
Newfoundland (McDonald) 🔨	2	0	0	2	2	0	4	X	X	X	10
Prince Edward Island (Mitchell)	0	0	1	0	0	1	0	X	X	X	2

Sheet D	1	2	3	4	5	6	7	8	9	10	Final
New Brunswick (Odishaw) 🔨	1	1	0	0	3	0	2	0	1	X	8
Nova Scotia (Flemming)	0	0	2	0	0	2	0	1	0	X	5

=== Draw 15 ===
Sheet A	1	2	3	4	5	6	7	8	9	10	Final
Nova Scotia (Flemming) 🔨	1	0	1	0	0	0	2	1	0	2	7
Northern Ontario (Melville)	0	2	0	2	1	0	0	0	1	0	6

Sheet B	1	2	3	4	5	6	7	8	9	10	Final
Newfoundland (McDonald) 🔨	1	0	2	0	0	1	0	2	1	X	7
British Columbia (McAulay)	0	1	0	1	1	0	1	0	0	X	4

Sheet C	1	2	3	4	5	6	7	8	9	10	Final
Ontario (Middaugh) 🔨	0	1	2	0	2	0	0	2	X	X	7
Alberta (Reed)	0	0	0	1	0	0	1	0	X	X	2

Sheet D	1	2	3	4	5	6	7	8	9	10	Final
Prince Edward Island (Mitchell) 🔨	0	0	1	1	0	1	1	2	0	X	6
Saskatchewan (Montgomery)	0	4	0	0	3	0	0	0	2	X	9

=== Draw 16 ===
Sheet A	1	2	3	4	5	6	7	8	9	10	Final
New Brunswick (Odishaw) 🔨	1	0	1	0	1	0	0	0	2	0	5
Manitoba (Duguid)	0	2	0	1	0	0	2	1	0	1	7

Sheet B	1	2	3	4	5	6	7	8	9	10	Final
Northwest Territories/Yukon (Alexander) 🔨	0	0	0	0	0	2	0	X	X	X	2
Newfoundland (McDonald)	1	0	1	1	1	0	3	X	X	X	7

Sheet C	1	2	3	4	5	6	7	8	9	10	Final
Saskatchewan (Montgomery) 🔨	0	1	0	1	0	0	0	0	X	X	2
Ontario (Middaugh)	1	0	3	0	0	0	0	2	X	X	6

Sheet D	1	2	3	4	5	6	7	8	9	10	Final
Northern Ontario (Melville) 🔨	0	0	0	1	0	2	1	0	0	X	4
Quebec (Hemmings)	2	0	0	0	4	0	0	0	0	X	6

=== Draw 17 ===
Sheet A	1	2	3	4	5	6	7	8	9	10	Final
Quebec (Hemmings) 🔨	1	0	0	2	0	1	0	2	0	0	6
Northwest Territories/Yukon (Alexander)	0	0	1	0	1	0	1	0	2	0	5

Sheet B	1	2	3	4	5	6	7	8	9	10	Final
British Columbia (McAulay) 🔨	0	3	1	0	0	0	5	X	X	X	9
Prince Edward Island (Mitchell)	0	0	0	0	1	1	0	X	X	X	2

Sheet C	1	2	3	4	5	6	7	8	9	10	Final
Manitoba (Duguid) 🔨	2	0	0	1	0	1	0	1	0	0	5
Nova Scotia (Flemming)	0	2	0	0	2	0	2	0	1	1	8

Sheet D	1	2	3	4	5	6	7	8	9	10	Final
Alberta (Reed) 🔨	1	0	0	0	1	2	0	0	3	X	7
New Brunswick (Odishaw)	0	0	2	1	0	0	1	0	0	X	4

== Tiebreaker ==
Sheet C	1	2	3	4	5	6	7	8	9	10	Final
Saskatchewan (Montgomery) 🔨	1	0	0	1	0	0	0	0	0	1	3
British Columbia (McAulay)	0	0	1	0	0	0	1	0	0	0	2

Player percentages
Saskatchewan		British Columbia	
Jeff Tait	94%	Darin Fenton	86%
Dwayne Mihalicz	84%	Bryan Miki	75%
Glen Despins	85%	Brent Pierce	79%
Rod Montgomery	82%	Greg McAulay	73%
Total	86%	Total	78%

== Playoffs ==
Page playoffs
1	Ontario	10
2	Quebec	4
3	Manitoba	6
4	Saskatchewan	3

Semifinal
2	Quebec	7
3	Manitoba	5

Final
1	Ontario	7
2	Quebec	4

=== 3 vs. 4 ===
Sheet B	1	2	3	4	5	6	7	8	9	10	Final
Manitoba (Duguid)	1	1	0	0	0	1	1	0	2	X	6
Saskatchewan (Montgomery) 🔨	0	0	2	0	0	0	0	1	0	X	3

Player percentages
Manitoba		Saskatchewan	
Doug Armstrong	86%	Jeff Tait	85%
Jim Spencer	78%	Dwayne Mihalicz	78%
James Kirkness	89%	Glen Despins	88%
Dale Duguid	89%	Rod Montgomery	72%
Total	85%	Total	81%

=== 1 vs. 2 ===
Sheet B	1	2	3	4	5	6	7	8	9	10	Final
Ontario (Middaugh) 🔨	1	0	0	3	0	4	0	2	X	X	10
Quebec (Hemmings)	0	2	0	0	1	0	1	0	X	X	4

Player percentages
Ontario		Quebec	
Scott Bailey	88%	Dale Ness	83%
Ian Tetley	84%	Guy Thibaudeau	69%
Graeme McCarrel	86%	Pierre Charette	91%
Wayne Middaugh	91%	Guy Hemmings	72%
Total	87%	Total	79%

=== Semifinal ===
Sheet C	1	2	3	4	5	6	7	8	9	10	Final
Quebec (Hemmings) 🔨	1	0	0	0	0	2	0	2	0	2	7
Manitoba (Duguid)	0	0	2	0	0	0	2	0	1	0	5

Player percentages
Quebec		Manitoba	
Dale Ness	89%	Doug Armstrong	89%
Guy Thibaudeau	73%	Jim Spencer	89%
Pierre Charette	70%	James Kirkness	73%
Guy Hemmings	88%	Dale Duguid	84%
Total	80%	Total	83%

=== Final ===
Sheet C	1	2	3	4	5	6	7	8	9	10	Final
Ontario (Middaugh) 🔨	1	1	1	0	1	0	2	0	1	X	7
Quebec (Hemmings)	0	0	0	0	0	3	0	1	0	X	4

Player percentages
Ontario		Quebec	
Scott Bailey	90%	Dale Ness	83%
Ian Tetley	70%	Guy Thibaudeau	78%
Graeme McCarrel	94%	Pierre Charette	81%
Wayne Middaugh	90%	Guy Hemmings	81%
Total	86%	Total	80%

== Statistics ==
=== Top 5 player percentages ===
Round Robin only

Leads	%
(Manitoba) Doug Armstrong	89
(Nova Scotia) Tom Fetterly	87
(Saskatchewan) Jeff Tait	86
(Ontario) Scott Bailey	85
(British Columbia) Darin Fenton	84

Seconds	%
(Ontario) Ian Tetley	84
(Manitoba) Jim Spencer	84
(Quebec) Guy Thibaudeau	83
(Alberta) Larry Gardeski	83
(British Columbia) Bryan Miki	81

Thirds	%
(Ontario) Graeme McCarrel	90
(Quebec) Pierre Charette	83
(Saskatchewan) Glen Despins	79
(Manitoba) James Kirkness	79
(New Brunswick) Tommy Sullivan	78

Skips	%
(Ontario) Wayne Middaugh	84
(Manitoba) Dale Duguid	83
(Quebec) Guy Hemmings	79
(Northern Ontario) Bruce Melville	75
(Saskatchewan) Rod Montgomery	74

=== Team percentages ===
Round Robin only

Province	Skip	%
Ontario	Wayne Middaugh	86
Manitoba	Dale Duguid	84
Quebec	Guy Hemmings	82
Saskatchewan	Rod Montgomery	79
British Columbia	Greg McAulay	79
Alberta	Tom Reed	78
Northern Ontario	Bruce Melville	77
Nova Scotia	Paul Flemming	77
New Brunswick	Terry Odishaw	74
Newfoundland	Toby McDonald	71
Northwest Territories/Yukon	Trevor Alexander	69
Prince Edward Island	Garth Mitchell	68
