= Neil Hampton =

Scottish curler

- Curler ♂

Team
- Curling club: Inverness CC

Curling career
- Member Association: Scotland
- World Championship: 1 (2000)
Medal record
Curling
Scottish Men's Championship
Gold medal – first place	2000

Neil Hampton is a Scottish curler.

At the national level, he is a 2000 Scottish men's champion curler.

== Teams ==
Season	Skip	Third	Second	Lead	Alternate	Coach	Events
1999–00	Robert Kelly	Neil Hampton	Tom Pendreigh	Ross Hepburn	Gordon Muirhead (WCC)	Robin Copland	SMCC 2000 (gold); WCC 2000 (8th)
2003–04	Robert Kelly	Neil Hampton	Tom Pendreigh	Ross Hepburn			
2004–05	Robert Kelly	Neil Hampton	Tom Pendreigh	Ross Hepburn			SMCC 2005 (8th)
2005–06	Brian Binnie	Neil Hampton	Richard Goldie	Neil Wilson			SMCC 2006 (7th)
2006–07	Brian Binnie	Neil Hampton	Richard Goldie	David Mundell			
