= Colin Hamilton (curler) =

Scottish curler

- Curler ♂

Team
- Curling club: Carrington CC, Edinburgh

Curling career
- Member Association: Scotland
- World Championship: 3 (1981, 1982, 1994)
- European Championship: 1 (1981)
- Other appearances: World Junior Championships: 1 (1978)
Medal record
Curling
World Junior Championships
Bronze medal – third place	1978 Grindelwald
Scottish Men's Championship
Gold medal – first place	1981
Gold medal – first place	1982
Gold medal – first place	1994

Colin Hamilton is a Scottish curler.

At the national level, he is a three-time Scottish men's champion curler (1981, 1982, 1994) and a two-time Scottish mixed champion curler (1994, 1995). Also he is a 1978 Scottish junior champion curler.

== Awards ==
- WJCC Sportsmanship Award: 1978

== Teams ==
=== Men's ===
Season	Skip	Third	Second	Lead	Alternate	Coach	Events
1977–78	Colin Hamilton	Douglas Edwardson	Trevor Dodds	David Ramsay			SJCC 1978 (gold); WJCC 1978 (bronze)
1980–81	Colin Hamilton	W. Michael Dick	David Ramsay	Richard Pretsel			SMCC 1981 (gold); WCC 1981 (6th)
1981–82	Colin Hamilton	David Ramsay	W. Michael Dick	Richard Pretsel		Chuck Hay (WCC)	ECC 1981 (7th); SMCC 1982 (gold); WCC 1982 (7th)
1993–94	Colin Hamilton	Bob Kelly	Vic Moran	Colin Barr	Trevor Dodds (WCC)		SMCC 1994 (gold); WCC 1994 (7th)
1994–95	Colin Hamilton	Colin Barr	Vic Moran	Trevor Dodds			
2000–01	Colin Hamilton	John Hamilton	David Ramsay	Colin Campbell			
2001–02	Colin Hamilton	Brian Binnie	David Ramsay	Gordon Clark			
2006–07	Colin Hamilton	W. Michael Dick	David Ramsay	Trevor Dodds			SMCC 2007 (8th)
2008–09	Colin Hamilton	W. Michael Dick	Sean Murphy	David Ramsay			
2008–09	Colin Hamilton	Adrian White	Billy Johnston	Sean Murphy			SMCC 2009 (8th)

=== Mixed ===
Season	Skip	Third	Second	Lead	Events
1993	Colin Hamilton	Carol Ross	Bob Kelly	Catherine Dodds	SMxCC 1993 (silver)
1994	Colin Hamilton	Carol Ross	Bob Kelly	Catherine Dodds	SMxCC 1994 (gold)
1995	Colin Hamilton	Carol Ross	Alan Westwood	Catherine Dodds	SMxCC 1995 (gold)
1997	Colin Hamilton	Carol Ross	Ian Gibb	Catherine Dodds	SMxCC 1997 (silver)
