= Michael Dick =

Scottish curler

- Curler ♂

Team
- Curling club: Carrington CC, Edinburgh

Curling career
- Member Association: Scotland
- World Championship: 2 (1981, 1982)
- European Championship: 1 (1981)
Medal record
Curling
Scottish Men's Championship
Gold medal – first place	1981
Gold medal – first place	1982

W. Michael "Mike" Dick is a Scottish curler.

At the national level, he is a two-time Scottish men's champion curler (1981, 1982).

== Teams ==
=== Men's ===
Season	Skip	Third	Second	Lead	Coach	Events
1980–81	Colin Hamilton	W. Michael Dick	David Ramsay	Richard Pretsel		SMCC 1981 (gold); WCC 1981 (6th)
1981–82	Colin Hamilton	David Ramsay	W. Michael Dick	Richard Pretsel	Chuck Hay (WCC)	ECC 1981 (7th); SMCC 1982 (gold); WCC 1982 (7th)
2006–07	Colin Hamilton	W. Michael Dick	David Ramsay	Trevor Dodds		SMCC 2007 (8th)
2008–09	Colin Hamilton	W. Michael Dick	Sean Murphy	David Ramsay		
2015–16	Mike Dick	Lindsay Scotland	Trevor Dodds	Michael Parker		SSCC 2016 (bronze)

=== Mixed ===
Season	Skip	Third	Second	Lead	Events
1979	Michael Dick	Alison Aitken	Trevor Dodds	Barbara Leonard	SMxCC 1979 (silver)
