= Colin Barr =

Scottish curler

- Curler ♂

Team
- Curling club: Carrington CC, Edinburgh

Curling career
- Member Association: Scotland
- World Championship: 1 (1994)
Medal record
Curling
Scottish Men's Championship
Gold medal – first place	1994

Colin Barr is a Scottish curler.

At the national level, he is a 1994 Scottish men's champion curler.

== Teams ==
=== Men's ===
Season	Skip	Third	Second	Lead	Alternate	Events
1993–94	Colin Hamilton	Bob Kelly	Vic Moran	Colin Barr	Trevor Dodds (WCC)	SMCC 1994 (gold); WCC 1994 (7th)
1994–95	Colin Hamilton	Colin Barr	Vic Moran	Trevor Dodds		

=== Mixed ===
Season	Skip	Third	Second	Lead	Events
1998	Bob Kelly	Gillian Barr	Colin Barr	Wendy Barr	SMxCC 1998 (silver)
