= Darin Fenton =

Canadian curler

- Curler ♂

Team
- Curling club: Royal City CC, New Westminster, BC

Curling career
- Member Association: British Columbia
- Brier: 2 (1998, 2000)
- World Championship: 1 (2000)
Medal record
Curling
Representing Canada
World Championships
Gold medal – first place	2000 Glasgow
Representing British Columbia
Tim Hortons Brier
Gold medal – first place	2000 Saskatoon

Darin Fenton (born c. 1968) is a Canadian curler.

He is a 2000 World Men's champion and a 2000 Labatt Brier champion.

== Teams ==
Season	Skip	Third	Second	Lead	Alternate	Coach	Events
1986–87	Brent Pierce	Ross Graham	Bryan Miki	Darin Fenton			CJCC 1987 (bronze)
1996–97	Brent Pierce	Al Roemer	Bryan Miki	Darin Fenton			
1997–98	Greg McAulay	Brent Pierce	Bryan Miki	Darin Fenton	Cary Sakiyama		Brier 1998 (5th)
1998–99	Greg McAulay	Brent Pierce	Bryan Miki	Darin Fenton			
1999–00	Greg McAulay	Brent Pierce	Bryan Miki	Jody Sveistrup	Darin Fenton	Glen Pierce	Brier 2000 (gold); WCC 2000 (gold)
2001–02	Greg McAulay	Brent Pierce	Bryan Miki	Jody Sveistrup	Darin Fenton		COCT 2001 (7th)
2003–04	Bryan Miki	Darin Fenton	Terry Hauk	Jay Batch			
2006–07	Dave Merklinger	Doug Wilcock	Darin Fenton	Chris Wilcock			
2016–17	Ron Leech	Bryan Kedziora	Darin Fenton	Mike Goertz			
