= Tom Pendreigh =

Scottish male curler and coach

- Curler ♂
- Born: 09 09 1955; Hawick

Team
- Curling club: Dalcross CC

Curling career
- Member Association: Scotland
- World Championship: 1 (2000)
Medal record
Curling
Scottish Men's Championship
Gold medal – first place	2000

Tom Pendreigh is a Scottish male curler and coach.

At the national level, he is a 2000 Scottish men's champion curler.

== Teams ==
Season	Skip	Third	Second	Lead	Alternate	Coach	Events
1999–00	Robert Kelly	Neil Hampton	Tom Pendreigh	Ross Hepburn	Gordon Muirhead (WCC)	Robin Copland	SMCC 2000 (gold); WCC 2000 (8th)
2000-01	Robert Kelly	Neil Hampton	Tom Pendreigh	Ross Hepburn			
2001-02	Robert Kelly	Neil Hampton	Tom Pendreigh	Ross Hepburn			
2002-03	Robert Kelly	Neil Hampton	Tom Pendreigh	Ross Hepburn			
2003–04	Robert Kelly	Neil Hampton	Tom Pendreigh	Ross Hepburn			
2004–05	Robert Kelly	Neil Hampton	Tom Pendreigh	Ross Hepburn			SMCC 2005 (8th)
2011–12	Ally Fraser	David Reid	Ruairidh Greenwood	Tom Pendreigh			
2016–17	Willie Jamieson	Tom Pendreigh	Gary Mcfarlane	?			
2017–18	Willie Jamieson	Tom Pendreigh	Graeme Adam	Jean Lesperance			
2018–19	Willie Jamieson	Tom Pendreigh	Graeme Adam	Jean Lesperance			

== Record as a coach of national teams ==
Year	Tournament, event	National team	Place
2003	2003 World Junior Curling Championships	Scotland (junior men)	5
2003	2003 European Curling Championships	Scotland (men)	1st place, gold medalist(s)
2004	2004 European Curling Championships	Scotland (men)	4
2005	2005 World Men's Curling Championship	Scotland (men)	2nd place, silver medalist(s)
2006	2006 Winter Paralympics	United Kingdom (wheelchair)	2nd place, silver medalist(s)
2006	2006 World Men's Curling Championship	Scotland (men)	1st place, gold medalist(s)
2006	2006 European Curling Championships	Scotland (men)	2nd place, silver medalist(s)
2007	2007 Winter Universiade	United Kingdom (junior men)	2nd place, silver medalist(s)
2008	2008 World Wheelchair Curling Championship	Scotland (wheelchair)	7
2009	2009 World Wheelchair Curling Championship	Scotland (wheelchair)	5
2010	2010 Winter Paralympics	United Kingdom (wheelchair)	6
2014	2014 World Men's Curling Championship	Scotland (men)	9

== Personal life ==
He is owner of British Curling Supplies.

As of 2018, he was a Chairman of Inverness Ice Centre.
