= Scottish Mixed Curling Championship =

- Established: 1976
- 2024 host city: Stirling
- 2024 arena: The Peak
- 2024 champion: Neil Kennedy; Ayr Curling Rink

The Scottish Mixed Curling Championship is the national mixed curling championship for Scotland. Team are composed of two men and two women, playing in alternating positions up the team, meaning the lead and third must be of the same gender, and likewise the second and fourth players. The championship has been held annually since 1976.

From 2005 to 2014 the winners progressed to represent Scotland at the European Mixed Curling Championship. Since 2015, the winners have represented Scotland at the World Mixed Curling Championship.

== Previous Winners ==
Teams are listed in the order fourth-lead. Skips are denoted in bold.

Scottish Mixed Curling Championship
	Winners	Runners-Up
Year	Team	Team
1976	Ken MacLennan; Ellie MacGillvary; **Allan Cameron**; Helen Munro	**Jim Whiteford**; Jessie Whiteford; Robin Whiteford; Nancy Whiteford
1977	**Hammy McMillan Sr**; Janet McMillan; Hugh Parker; Kathleen Parker	**Les Bell**; Sheila Pollock; Bob Pollock; Margaret Johnstone
1978	**Jimmy Sanderson**; Jane Sanderson; Iain Baxter; Helen Baxter	**Matt Murdoch**; Almira Shedden; Jack Shedden; Vi Millar
1979	**Bill Allison**; Helen Burton; John Strang; Alison Allison	**Michael Dick**; Alison Aitken; Trevor Dodds; Barbara Leonard
1980	**Bob Chrisp**; Grace Stirling; Barry Stirling; Janette Chrisp	**Kerr Graham**; Carolyn Hibberd; Bob Cowan; Alison Brown
1981	**Andrew McQuistin**; Joyce Kinnear; Hammy McMillan; Jean Caldwell	
1982	**Hugh Aitken**; Fiona McMillan; Norman Brown; Janie Ferguson	**Iain Baxter**; Christine Wood; Jimmy Wood; Helen Baxter
1983	**Gordon Muirhead**; Cate Brewster; Tom Brewster Sr; Betty Bonthrone	Jim Steele; Moira Hamilton; **Bill Carruthers**; Helen Hamilton
1984	**Jack Brown**; Annie Kennedy; Jack Kennedy; Jessie Brown	**Gordon Muirhead**; Cate Brewster; Tom Brewster Sr; Betty Bonthrone
1985	**Ian Morrison**; Mary Scobie; James Muir; Janice Ogilvie	**Margaret Robertson**; Keith Prentice; Gwen Prentice; John Robertson
1986	**Gordon Muirhead**; Cate Brewster; John Baillie; Betty Bonthrone	**Ian Morrison**; Mary Scobie; James Muir; Janice Ogilvie
1987	**Jim Waddell**; Isobel Waddell; Alec Torrance; Isobel Torrance	**David Smith**; Cathie Drysdale; Peter Smith; Morag Ewan
1988	**Hugh Aitken**; Gail McMillan; Hammy McMillan; Marie McWilliam	**Keith Prentice**; Margaret Robertson; John Robertson; Gwen Prentice
1989	**Ian Morrison**; Mary Scobie; James Muir; Janice Ogilvie	**Murray McEwan**; Betty Eddie; Bill Silver; Agnes Gordon
1990	**Robin Gray**; Rhona Howie; Warwick Smith; Karen Thompson	**Jim Black**; Margot Woods; Gordon Herbert; Susan Bryden
1991	**Robin Gray**; Rhona Martin; Robert Wilson; Joan Wilson	**Hammy McMillan**; Lorna McMillan; John Dalrymple; Gail McMillan
1992	**Robin Gray**; Rhona Martin; Robert Wilson; Joan Wilson	**David Hardie**; Gail McMillan; John Dalrymple; Fay McMillan
1993	**Peter Loudon**; Edith Loudon; Alec Torrance Jr; Katie Loudon	**Colin Hamilton**; Carol Ross; Bob Kelly; Catherine Dodds
1994	**Colin Hamilton**; Carol Ross; Bob Kelly; Catherine Dodds	**Robin Gray**; Rhona Martin; Crawford Hastings; Linda MacAulay
1995	**Colin Hamilton**; Carol Ross; Alan Westwood; Catherine Dodds	**Peter Loudon**; Edith Loudon; Russell Keiller; Katie Loudon
1996	**Brian Binnie**; Claire Milne; Duncan Bertram; Alison Binnie	**Neil Wilson**; Lorna Rettig; Brian Smith; Sandra Hynd
1997	**Brian Binnie**; Claire Milne; Warwick Smith; Alison Binnie	**Colin Hamilton**; Carol Ross; Ian Gibb; Catherine Dodds
1998	**Roy Henderson**; Carolyn Morris; Angus Robertson; Kim Morris	**Bob Kelly**; Gillian Barr; Colin Barr; Wendy Barr
1999	**Neil Joss**; Kirsty Balfour; Paul Bowie; Jackie Crescent	**Ewan Hay**; Kathleen Scott; Robbie Scott; Isabel Hay
2000	**Ross Mackay**; Kelly Wood; Garry Mackay; Lindsay Wood	**Billy Henderson**; Jacquellyn Birrell; Mark Milne; Maureen Borland
2001	**Angus Robertson**; Jackie Lockhart; Roy Henderson; Maureen Borland	**Neil Joss**; Edith Loudon; Mark Brass; Karen Addison
2002	**Keith Prentice**; Carolyn Morris; Robin Aitken; Gwen Prentice	**Neil Joss**; Edith Loudon; Graeme Prentice; Karen Addison
2003	**Kelly Wood**; Gary Wood; Lindsay Wood; Graeme Prentice	**Brian Binnie**; Claire Milne; Ronald Brewster; Nancy Murdoch
2004	**Kelly Wood**; Ross MacDonald; Lindsay Wood; Kenneth Edwards	**Angus Robertson**; Carolyn Morris; Roy Henderson; Maureen Borland
2005	**Derek Brown**; Cathryn Guthrie; Greig Smith; Rhona Brown	**Bill Thomson**; Jill Donald; Hugh Thomson; Louise Soutar
2006	**Tom Brewster**; Jackie Lockhart; David Hay; Kim Brewster	**Keith Prentice**; Sheila Swan; Neil Macarthur; Rosemary Arkley
2007	Glen Muirhead; Eve Muirhead; **Gordon Muirhead**; Anna Sloan	**Moray Combe**; Karen Addison; Sandy Christie; Anne Laird
2008	**Alan Smith**; Gillian Howard; David Mundell; Karen Strang	Glen Muirhead; Eve Muirhead; **Gordon Muirhead**; Anna Sloan
2009	**Tom Brewster**; Lynn Cameron; Colin Campbell; Michelle Silvera	Alasdair Guthrie; Anna Sloan; **John Hamilton**; Cathryn Guthrie
2010	**David Edwards**; Claire Perras; Dillon Perras; Louise Wood	**Duncan Fernie**; Lynn Cameron; Colin Campbell; Michelle Silvera
2011	**David Edwards**; Kerry Barr; Scott Macleod; Louise Wood	Neil Joss; Judith McFarlane; Gary Rutherford; Margaret Richardson
2012	**Ewan MacDonald**; Eve Muirhead; Euan Byers; Karen Barthelemy	**Duncan Fernie**; Lynn Cameron; Colin Campbell; Michelle Silvera
2013	**Ewan MacDonald**; Eve Muirhead; Euan Byers; Karen Barthelemy	**David Mundell**; Sarah Reid; David Reid; Fiona Steele
2014	**Kyle Smith**; Hannah Fleming; Billy Morton; Alice Spence	John Penny; **Kim Brewster**; Scott Macleod; Karen Barthelemy
2015	**Cameron Bryce**; Katie Murray; Bobby Lammie; Sophie Jackson	**Craig Waddell**; Heather Morton; Cammy Smith; Jodie Milroy
2016	**Cameron Bryce**; Katie Murray; Bobby Lammie; Sophie Jackson	Duncan Menzies; Rowena Kerr; **Blair Fraser**; Abi Brown
2017	Grant Hardie; Rhiann MacLeod; **Billy Morton**; Barbara McFarlane	**Craig Waddell**; Mili Smith; Cammy Smith; Sophie Sinclair
2018	**Robin Brydone**; Rebecca Morrison; Ross Whyte; Leeanne McKenzie	**Grant Hardie**; Rhiann MacLeod; **Billy Morton**; Barbara McFarlane
2019	**Luke Carson**; Kirsten Bousie; Mark Taylor; Katie McMillan	**Ross Whyte**; Rebecca Morrison; Ryan McCormick; Leeanne McKenzie
2022	**Cameron Bryce**; Lisa Davie; Scott Hyslop; Robyn Munro	**James Craik**; Fay Henderson; Angus Bryce; Laura Watt alt.: Emma Barr
2023	**Jack Strawhorn**; Robyn Mitchell; Kaleb Johnston; Amy Mitchell	**Cameron Bryce**; Robyn Munro; Scott Hyslop; Laura Watt
2024	**Neil Kennedy**; Margaret Agnew; John Agnew; Sheila Kennedy	Kyle Smith; Rhiann Stagg; **Billy Morton**; Barbara Morton
2025	cancelled	

== See also ==
- Scottish Men's Curling Championship
- Scottish Women's Curling Championship
- Scottish Mixed Doubles Curling Championship
- Scottish Junior Curling Championships
- Scottish Senior Curling Championships
- Scottish Schools Curling Championship
- Scottish Wheelchair Curling Championship
