= 2000 World Men's Curling Championship =

- Host city: Glasgow, Scotland
- Arena: Braehead Arena
- Dates: April 1–9, 2000
- Winner: Canada
- Curling club: Royal City CC, New Westminster, British Columbia
- Skip: Greg McAulay
- Third: Brent Pierce
- Second: Bryan Miki
- Lead: Jody Sveistrup
- Alternate: Darin Fenton
- Coach: Glen Pierce
- Finalist: Sweden (Peja Lindholm)

The 2000 World Men's Curling Championship (branded as 2000 Ford World Men's Curling Championship for sponsorship reasons) was held at the Braehead Arena in Renfrew, Scotland from April 1–9, 2000.

== Teams ==
Canada	Denmark	Finland	France	Japan
Royal City CC, New Westminster, British Columbia Skip: Greg McAulay; Third: Brent Pierce; Second: Bryan Miki; Lead: Jody Sveistrup; Alternate: Darin Fenton	Hvidovre CC Skip: Ulrik Schmidt; Third: Lasse Lavrsen; Second: Brian Hansen; Lead: Carsten Svensgaard; Alternate: Frants Gufler	Helsinki CC Skip: Markku Uusipaavalniemi; Third: Wille Mäkelä; Second: Tommi Häti; Lead: Jari Laukkanen; Alternate: Perttu Piilo	Megève CC Skip: Thierry Mercier; Third: Cyrille Prunet; Second: Eric Laffin; Lead: Gerard Ravello; Alternate: Lionel Tournier	Miyota CC Skip: Hiroaki Kashiwagi; Third: Kazuto Yanagizawa; Second: Takanori Ichimura; Lead: Keita Yanagizawa; Alternate: Yuki Inoue
Norway	Scotland	Sweden	Switzerland	United States
Stabekk CC, Oslo Skip: Pål Trulsen; Third: Lars Vågberg; Second: Flemming Davanger; Lead: Bent Ånund Ramsfjell; Alternate: Jan Thoresen	Inverness CC Skip: Robert Kelly; Third: Neil Hampton; Second: Tom Pendreigh; Lead: Ross Hepburn; Alternate: Gordon Muirhead	Östersunds CK Skip: Peter Lindholm; Third: Tomas Nordin; Second: Magnus Swartling; Lead: Peter Narup; Alternate: Marcus Feldt	Lausanne-Olympique CC Skip: Patrick Hürlimann; Third: Dominic Andres; Second: Martin Romang; Lead: Diego Perren; Alternate: Patrik Lörtscher	Madison CC, Madison, Wisconsin Skip: Craig Brown; Third: Ryan Quinn; Second: Jon Brunt; Lead: John Dunlop; Alternate: Steve Brown

== Round robin standings ==
Key
Teams to playoffs

Country	Skip	W	L
Canada	Greg McAulay	8	1
Sweden	Peja Lindholm	7	2
Finland	Markku Uusipaavalniemi	7	2
United States	Craig Brown	5	4
Denmark	Ulrik Schmidt	4	5
Switzerland	Patrick Hürlimann	4	5
Norway	Pål Trulsen	4	5
Scotland	Robert Kelly	3	6
France	Thierry Mercier	2	7
Japan	Hiroaki Kashiwagi	1	8

== Round robin results ==
=== Draw 1 ===
Sheet A	Final
Norway (Trulsen)	5
Denmark (Schmidt)	6

Sheet B	Final
Switzerland (Hürlimann)	6
Scotland (Kelly)	7

Sheet C	Final
Finland (Uusipaavalniemi)	7
Sweden (Lindholm)	8

Sheet D	Final
United States (Brown)	10
Japan (Kashiwagi)	4

Sheet E	Final
France (Mercier)	2
Canada (McAulay)	8

=== Draw 2 ===
Sheet A	Final
France (Mercier)	1
Scotland (Kelly)	8

Sheet B	Final
Canada (McAulay)	9
Finland (Uusipaavalniemi)	2

Sheet C	Final
Norway (Trulsen)	4
Switzerland (Hürlimann)	10

Sheet D	Final
Sweden (Lindholm)	10
France (Mercier)	2

Sheet E	Final
Denmark (Schmidt)	9
United States (Brown)	11

=== Draw 3 ===
Sheet A	Final
Finland (Uusipaavalniemi)	7
Norway (Trulsen)	3

Sheet B	Final
Sweden (Lindholm)	9
United States (Brown)	6

Sheet C	Final
Scotland (Kelly)	3
France (Mercier)	7

Sheet D	Final
Canada (McAulay)	11
Denmark (Schmidt)	7

Sheet E	Final
Switzerland (Hürlimann)	9
Japan (Kashiwagi)	5

=== Draw 4 ===
Sheet A	Final
Denmark (Schmidt)	8
Switzerland (Hürlimann)	6

Sheet B	Final
France (Mercier)	6
Norway (Trulsen)	5

Sheet C	Final
Japan (Kashiwagi)	2
Canada (McAulay)	11

Sheet D	Final
Scotland (Kelly)	2
Sweden (Lindholm)	10

Sheet E	Final
United States (Brown)	4
Finland (Uusipaavalniemi)	9

=== Draw 5 ===
Sheet A	Final
Sweden (Lindholm)	3
Canada (McAulay)	0

Sheet B	Final
United States (Brown)	8
Switzerland (Hürlimann)	4

Sheet C	Final
France (Mercier)	5
Finland (Uusipaavalniemi)	9

Sheet D	Final
Japan (Kashiwagi)	1
Norway (Trulsen)	14

Sheet E	Final
Scotland (Kelly)	8
Denmark (Schmidt)	5

=== Draw 6 ===
Sheet A	Final
France (Mercier)	3
Japan (Kashiwagi)	11

Sheet B	Final
Scotland (Kelly)	4
Canada (McAulay)	7

Sheet C	Final
United States (Brown)	5
Norway (Trulsen)	7

Sheet D	Final
Denmark (Schmidt)	6
Finland (Uusipaavalniemi)	11

Sheet E	Final
Sweden (Lindholm)	8
Switzerland (Hürlimann)	5

=== Draw 7 ===
Sheet A	Final
Scotland (Kelly)	2
United States (Brown)	8

Sheet B	Final
Finland (Uusipaavalniemi)	7
Japan (Kashiwagi)	6

Sheet C	Final
Sweden (Lindholm)	8
Denmark (Schmidt)	4

Sheet D	Final
France (Mercier)	4
Switzerland (Hürlimann)	8

Sheet E	Final
Canada (McAulay)	6
Norway (Trulsen)	4

=== Draw 8 ===
Sheet A	Final
Switzerland (Hürlimann)	7
Finland (Uusipaavalniemi)	10

Sheet B	Final
Denmark (Schmidt)	7
France (Mercier)	4

Sheet C	Final
Canada (McAulay)	8
United States (Brown)	4

Sheet D	Final
Norway (Trulsen)	7
Scotland (Kelly)	3

Sheet E	Final
Japan (Kashiwagi)	6
Sweden (Lindholm)	10

=== Draw 9 ===
Sheet A	Final
United States (Brown)	4
France (Mercier)	2

Sheet B	Final
Norway (Trulsen)	6
Sweden (Lindholm)	2

Sheet C	Final
Denmark (Schmidt)	10
Japan (Kashiwagi)	3

Sheet D	Final
Switzerland (Hürlimann)	8
Canada (McAulay)	7

Sheet E	Final
Finland (Uusipaavalniemi)	7
Scotland (Kelly)	3

== Playoffs ==
=== Brackets ===
Semi-final
1	Canada	11
4	United States	3
2	Sweden	9
3	Finland	2

Final
1	Canada	9
2	Sweden	4
Bronze medal
3	Finland	9
4	United States	4

=== Final ===
Sheet A	1	2	3	4	5	6	7	8	9	10	Final
Canada (McAulay)	1	1	0	2	1	0	2	0	2	X	9
Sweden (Lindholm)	0	0	2	0	0	1	0	1	0	X	4

2000 Ford World Curling Championship
(Canada)
Canada
26th title
