= 1978 World Junior Curling Championships =

- Host city: Grindelwald, Switzerland
- Dates: March 10–17
- Men's winner: Canada (3rd title)
- Skip: Paul Gowsell
- Third: John Ferguson
- Second: Douglas McFarlane
- Lead: Kelly Stearne
- Finalist: Sweden (Thomas Håkansson)

The 1978 World Junior Curling Championships were held from March 10 to 17 in Grindelwald, Switzerland for men's teams only.

== Teams ==
Country	Skip	Third	Second	Lead	Curling club
Canada	Paul Gowsell	John Ferguson	Douglas McFarlane	Kelly Stearne	
Denmark	Tommy Stjerne	Oluf Olsen	Steen Hansen	Peter Andersen	Hvidovre CC
France	Yves Tronc	Pascal Pagliano	Christophe Boan	André Jouvent	
West Germany	Rainer Schöpp	Wolfgang Artinger	Norbert Petrasch	Christoph Falk	
Italy	Massimo Alvera	Franco Sovilla	Stefano Morona	Dennis Ghezze	Cortina CC, Cortina d'Ampezzo
Norway	Sjur Loen	Morten Søgaard	Roar Rise	Tom Søgaard	Brumunddal CC, Oslo
Scotland	Colin Hamilton	Douglas Edwardson	Trevor Dodds	David Ramsay	Carrington CC, Edinburgh
Sweden	Thomas Håkansson	Per Lindeman	Lars Lindgren	Erik Björemo	Karlstads CK, Karlstad
Switzerland	Felix Luchsinger	Thomas Grendelmeier	Danny Strelif	Ueli Bernauer	
United States	Jeff Tomlinson	Ted Purvis	Curtis Fish	Marc McCartney	

== Round robin ==
Place	Team	1	2	3	4	5	6	7	8	9	10	Wins	Losses
1	Canada	*	8:5	3:5	7:5	6:5	8:4	7:4	6:4	9:4	6:2	8	1
2	Scotland	5:8	*	7:2	6:4	8:2	6:4	5:4	7:5	6:5	4:3	8	1
3	Sweden	5:3	2:7	*	4:8	3:4	7:5	8:6	7:5	5:4	8:2	6	3
4	Norway	5:7	4:6	8:4	*	8:6	3:2	4:7	7:4	9:3	12:2	5	4
4	United States	5:6	2:8	4:3	6:8	*	7:3	5:6	8:7	4:3	5:3	5	4
6	West Germany	4:8	4:6	5:7	2:3	3:7	*	8:7	6:5	9:5	8:4	4	5
7	Switzerland	4:7	4:5	6:8	7:4	6:5	7:8	*	7:6	13:3	5:6	4	5
8	Denmark	4:6	5:7	5:7	4:7	7:8	5:6	6:7	*	8:5	7:6	3	6
9	France	4:9	5:6	4:5	3:9	3:4	5:9	3:13	5:8	*	7:3	1	8
10	Italy	2:6	3:4	2:8	2:12	3:5	4:8	6:5	6:7	3:7	*	1	8

Teams to playoffs
Teams to tiebreaker

== Tiebreaker ==
Team	Final
Norway	6
United States	5

== Playoffs ==
Semifinal
1	Canada	4
4	Norway	3
2	Scotland	4
3	Sweden	5

Gold Medal Game
1	Canada	4
2	Sweden	2

== Final standings ==
Place	Team	Games played	Wins	Losses
1st place, gold medalist(s)	Canada	11	10	1
2nd place, silver medalist(s)	Sweden	11	7	4
3rd place, bronze medalist(s)	Scotland	10	8	2
4	Norway	11	6	5
5	United States	10	5	5
6	West Germany	9	4	5
7	Switzerland	9	4	5
8	Denmark	9	3	6
9	France	9	1	8
10	Italy	9	1	8

== Awards ==
- WJCC Sportsmanship Award: (Scotland) Colin Hamilton

All-Star Team:

- Skip: (Canada) Paul Gowsell
- Third: (Scotland) Douglas Edwardson
- Second: (Canada) Douglas McFarlane
- Lead: (Scotland) David Ramsay
