= Bryan Miki =

Canadian male curler

- Curler ♂
- Born: May 19, 1969 (age 57); Burnaby, British Columbia, Canada

Team
- Curling club: Royal City CC, New Westminster, BC

Curling career
- Member Association: British Columbia
- Brier: 2 (1998, 2000)
- World Championship: 1 (2000)
Medal record
Curling
Representing Canada
World Championships
| Gold medal – first place | 2000 Glasgow |
Representing British Columbia
Labatt Brier
| Gold medal – first place | 2000 Saskatoon |

Bryan Miki (born May 15, 1969) is a Canadian curler.

He is a 2000 World Men's champion and a 2000 Labatt Brier champion.

Miki coached British Columbia to a gold medal at the 2019 Canada Winter Games. He currently coaches the Jordon McDonald rink.

== Awards ==
- Hec Gervais Playoff MVP Award: 2000
- Ross Harstone Sportsmanship Award: 2000
- British Columbia Sports Hall of Fame: inducted in 2002 with all of 2000 Greg McAulay team, Canadian and World champions
- Burnaby Sports Hall of Fame: 2017

== Teams ==
| Season | Skip | Third | Second | Lead | Alternate | Coach | Events |
|---|---|---|---|---|---|---|---|
| 1986–87 | Brent Pierce | Ross Graham | Bryan Miki | Darin Fenton | | | CJCC 1987 (bronze) |
| 1996–97 | Brent Pierce | Al Roemer | Bryan Miki | Darin Fenton | | | |
| 1997–98 | Greg McAulay | Brent Pierce | Bryan Miki | Darin Fenton | Cary Sakiyama | | Brier 1998 (5th) |
| 1998–99 | Greg McAulay | Brent Pierce | Bryan Miki | Darin Fenton | | | |
| 1999–00 | Greg McAulay | Brent Pierce | Bryan Miki | Jody Sveistrup | Darin Fenton | Glen Pierce | Brier 2000 (gold); WCC 2000 (gold) |
| 2000–01 | Greg McAulay | Brent Pierce | Bryan Miki | Jody Sveistrup | | | |
| 2001–02 | Greg McAulay | Brent Pierce | Bryan Miki | Jody Sveistrup | Darin Fenton | | COCT 2001 (7th) |
| 2002–03 | Brent Pierce | Bryan Miki | Dean Koyanagi | Ross Graham | | | |
| 2003–04 | Bryan Miki | Darin Fenton | Terry Hauk | Jay Batch | | | |
| 2004–05 | Bryan Miki | Doug Wilcock | Dean Koyanagi | Terry Hauk | | | |
| 2005–06 | Bryan Miki | Dean Lunn | Jay Batch | Terry Hauk | | | |
| 2005–06 | Jay Peachey | Ron Leech | Kevin Recksiedler | Brad Fenton | Bryan Miki | | COCT 2005 (10th) |
| 2006–07 | Brent Pierce | Bryan Miki | Andrew Bilesky | Brendan Willis | Jay Batch | | |
| 2007–08 | Bryan Miki | Darin Laface | Jay Batch | Chad Hofmann | | | |
| 2008–09 | Bryan Miki | Tyler Klitch | Jay Batch | Chad Hofmann | | | |
| 2009–10 | Bryan Miki | Tyler Klitch | Jay Batch | Chad Hofmann | | | |
| 2010–11 | Bryan Miki | Tyler Klitch | Jay Batch | Chad Hofmann | | | |
| 2011–12 | Dean Joanisse | Tyler Klitch | Bryan Miki | Jay Batch | | | |
| 2012–13 | Bryan Miki | Jay Batch | Ernie Daniels | Curtis Tateyama | | | |

=== Mixed ===
| Season | Skip | Third | Second | Lead | Events |
|---|---|---|---|---|---|
| 2008 | Bryan Miki | Adina Tasaka | Jay Batch | Jacalyn Brown | CMxCC 2008 (5th) |

== Personal life ==
Miki's father Fuji was the first ever curler of Japanese descent to play at the Brier in 1979. and is a former Canadian Mixed Champion, and is a former coach of the Japanese women's curling team. Bryan Miki grew up in South Burnaby, British Columbia, and currently lives in Port Coquitlam. His son Joshua also curls, and was a member of the 2019 gold medal winning team at the Canada Games.

At the time of the 2000 World Championships, Miki was employed as a leak survey technician for BC Gas. He currently works as a gasfitter for FortisBC.
