= Trevor Dodds (curler) =

Scottish male curler

- Curler ♂

Team
- Curling club: Carrington CC, Edinburgh

Curling career
- Member Association: Scotland
- World Championship: 1 (1994)
- Other appearances: World Junior Championships: 1 (1978)
Medal record
Curling
World Junior Championships
Bronze medal – third place	1978 Grindelwald

Trevor Dodds is a Scottish curler.

At the international level, he was a participant at the 1994 World Men's Championship.

At the national level, he is a 1978 Scottish junior champion curler.

== Teams ==
=== Men's ===
Season	Skip	Third	Second	Lead	Alternate	Events
1977–78	Colin Hamilton	Douglas Edwardson	Trevor Dodds	David Ramsay		SJCC 1978 (gold); WJCC 1978 (bronze)
1993–94	Colin Hamilton	Bob Kelly	Vic Moran	Colin Barr	Trevor Dodds	WCC 1994 (7th)
1994–95	Colin Hamilton	Colin Barr	Vic Moran	Trevor Dodds		
2006–07	Colin Hamilton	W. Michael Dick	David Ramsay	Trevor Dodds		SMCC 2007 (8th)

=== Mixed ===
Season	Skip	Third	Second	Lead	Events
1979	Michael Dick	Alison Aitken	Trevor Dodds	Barbara Leonard	SMxCC 1979 (silver)

== Personal life ==
His daughter is curler Jennifer Dodds. She currently plays second on Team Eve Muirhead.
