= Pekka Saarelainen (curler) =

Finnish male curler

- Curler ♂
- Born: 17 March 1967 (age 59); Helsinki, Finland

Team
- Curling club: Hyvinkää CC

Curling career
- Member Association: Finland
- World Championship: 1 (2001)
- European Championship: 4 (1993, 1994, 2000, 2001)
- Olympic: 1 (2002)
Medal record
Curling
European Championships
Gold medal – first place	2000 Oberstdorf
Bronze medal – third place	2001 Vierumäki
Finnish Men's Championship
Gold medal – first place	1993
Gold medal – first place	2001
Gold medal – first place	2002
Silver medal – second place	1999
Silver medal – second place	2004

Pekka Juhani Saarelainen (born 17 March 1967 in Helsinki, Finland) is a Finnish male curler.

He is a European curling champion (2000) and competed at the 2002 Winter Olympics where the Finnish men's curling team placed fifth.

He started curling in 1985 at the age of 18.

== Teams ==
Season	Skip	Third	Second	Lead	Alternate	Coach	Events
1992–93	Jari Laukkanen	Pekka Saarelainen	Marko Latvala	Tommi Valvelainen			FMCC 1993 (gold)
1993–94	Jari Laukkanen	Petri Tsutsunen	Pekka Saarelainen	Marko Latvala	Tommi Valvelainen		ECC 1993 (7th)
1994–95	Tomi Rantamäki	Jussi Uusipaavalniemi	Jussi Heinonsalo	Markku Henttonen	Pekka Saarelaine	Anders Thidholm	ECC 1994 (9th)
1998–99	Pekka Saarelainen	?	?	?			FMCC 1999 (silver)
1999–00	Pekka Saarelainen	?	?	?			FMCC 2000 (4th)
2000–01	Markku Uusipaavalniemi	Wille Mäkelä	Tommi Häti	Jari Laukkanen	Pekka Saarelainen		ECC 2000 (gold); FMCC 2001 (gold); WCC 2001 (5th)
2001–02	Markku Uusipaavalniemi	Wille Mäkelä	Tommi Häti	Jari Laukkanen	Pekka Saarelainen	Ken Armstrong (ECC)	ECC 2001 (bronze); FMCC 2002 (gold); OG 2002 (5th)
2003–04	Wille Mäkelä	Pekka Saarelainen	?	?			FMCC 2004 (silver)
2004–05	Wille Mäkelä	Jari Laukkanen	Pekka Saarelainen	Tommi Häti	Riku Raunio		FMCC 2005 (5th)
