= Lionel Tournier =

French male curler

- Curler ♂

Team
- Curling club: Club de sports Megève, Megève

Curling career
- Member Association: France
- World Championship: 1 (2000)
- European Championship: 10 (1989, 1990, 1993, 1994, 1995, 1996, 1997, 1998, 1999, 2001)
- Other appearances: World Junior Championships: 3 (1985, 1986, 1988)
Medal record
Curling

Lionel Tournier is a French curler.

== Teams ==
Season	Skip	Third	Second	Lead	Alternate	Coach	Events
1984–85	Lionel Tournier	Frank Riom	Jean-Francois Delavay	Pascal Coppel			WJCC 1985 (8th)
1985–86	Lionel Tournier	Thierry Mercier	Jean-Francois Delavay	Pascal Coppel			WJCC 1986 (9th)
1987–88	Thierry Mercier	Lionel Tournier	Christian Cossetto	René-Georges Wohlfei	Jan Henri Ducroz		WJCC 1988 (9th)
1989–90	Dominique Dupont-Roc	Daniel Cosetto	Lionel Tournier	Patrick Philippe			ECC 1989 (4th)
1990–91	Thierry Mercier	Daniel Cosetto	Lionel Tournier	Laurent Flenghi	Joel Indergand		ECC 1990 (6th)
1993–94	Jan Henri Ducroz	Christian Dupont-Roc	Lionel Tournier	Cyrille Prunet	Thierry Mercier		ECC 1993 (6th)
1994–95	Thierry Mercier (fourth)	Christophe Boan (skip)	Patrick Philippe	Gerard Ravello	Lionel Tournier	Michel Jeannot	ECC 1994 (13th)
1995–96	Jan Henri Ducroz	Spencer Mugnier	Daniel Cosetto	Thomas Dufour	Lionel Tournier	Patrick Philippe	ECC 1995 (8th)
1996–97	Jan Henri Ducroz	Spencer Mugnier	Thomas Dufour	Lionel Tournier	Cyrille Prunet		ECC 1996 (13th)
1997–98	Jan Henri Ducroz	Spencer Mugnier	Thomas Dufour	Cyrille Prunet	Lionel Tournier	Raymond Ducroz	ECC 1997 (11th)
1998–99	Jan Henri Ducroz	Spencer Mugnier	Thomas Dufour	Lionel Tournier	Cyrille Prunet	Maurice Dupont-Roc, Andrée Dupont-Roc	ECC 1998 (13th)
1999–00	Thierry Mercier	Cyrille Prunet	Eric Laffin	Gerard Ravello	Lionel Tournier		ECC 1999 (7th); WCC 2000 (9th)
2001–02	Thierry Mercier	Cyrille Prunet	Eric Laffin	Lionel Tournier			ECC 2001 (7th)
