= Gerard Ravello =

French curler (born 1959)

- Curler ♂
- Born: 5 March 1959 (age 67)

Team
- Curling club: Club de sports Megève, Megève

Curling career
- Member Association: France
- World Championship: 4 (1981, 1988, 1992, 2000)
- European Championship: 3 (1987, 1994, 1999)
- Other appearances: World Junior Championships: 2 (1979, 1980)
Medal record
Curling

Gerard Ravello (born 5 March 1959) is a French curler.

== Teams ==
Season	Skip	Third	Second	Lead	Alternate	Coach	Events
1978–79	Claude Feige	Gilles Marin-Pache	Gerard Ravello	Christophe Boan			WJCC 1979 (9th)
1979–80	Yves Tronc	Christophe Boan	Gerard Ravello	André Jouvent			WJCC 1980 (8th)
1980–81	Gerard Ravello (fourth)	André Jouvent	Jacques Joulien	Gérard Alazet (skip)			WCC 1981 (10th)
1987–88	Christophe Boan	Gerard Ravello	Alain Brangi	Thierry Mercier			ECC 1987 (12th)
1987–88	Christophe Boan	Thierry Mercier	Gerard Ravello	Alain Brangi			WCC 1988 (7th)
1991–92	Thierry Mercier (fourth)	Christophe Boan (skip)	Spencer Mugnier	Gerard Ravello			WCC 1992 (10th)
1994–95	Thierry Mercier (fourth)	Christophe Boan (skip)	Patrick Philippe	Gerard Ravello	Lionel Tournier	Michel Jeannot	ECC 1994 (13th)
1999–00	Thierry Mercier	Cyrille Prunet	Eric Laffin	Gerard Ravello	Lionel Tournier		ECC 1999 (7th); WCC 2000 (9th)
