= Collie Campbell Memorial Award =

The Collie Campbell Memorial Award was created in honour of Canadian Collie Campbell, who served as president of the International Curling Federation, now known as the World Curling Federation, from 1969 until his death in 1978. It is presented to the male curler "who best displays the ideals of sportsmanship and skill" during the World Men's Curling Championship. The winner is selected by his fellow curlers in the tournament.

== Winners ==
Year	Winner	Country
1979	Keith Wendorf	West Germany
1980	Greig Henderson	Scotland
1981	Mark Olson	Canada
1982	Rick Lang	Canada
1983	Keith Wendorf	West Germany
1984	Mike Hay	Scotland
1985	Tim Wright	United States
1986	Uli Sutor	West Germany
1987	Göran Roxin	Sweden
1988	Bo Bakke	Norway
1989	Tommy Stjerne	Denmark
1990	Tommy Stjerne	Denmark
1991	Markus Eggler	Switzerland
1992	Jussi Uusipaavalniemi	Finland
1993	Hugh Millikin	Australia
1994	Gert Larsen	Denmark
1995	Peja Lindholm	Sweden
1996	Mikael Hasselborg	Sweden
1997	Jussi Uusipaavalniemi	Finland
1998	Markku Uusipaavalniemi	Finland
1999	Sean Becker	New Zealand
2000	Greg McAulay	Canada
2001	Spencer Mugnier	France
2002	Pål Trulsen	Norway
2003	Markku Uusipaavalniemi	Finland
2004	Sean Becker	New Zealand
2005	Marco Mariani	Italy
2006	Ewan MacDonald	Scotland
2007	Ralph Stöckli	Switzerland
2008	Thomas Dufour	France
2009	Wang Fengchun	China
2010	Torger Nergård	Norway
2011	Thomas Ulsrud	Norway
2012	Sean Becker	New Zealand
2013	Niklas Edin	Sweden
2014	Ewan MacDonald	Scotland
2015	Kosuke Morozumi	Japan
2016	Kosuke Morozumi	Japan
2017	Carlo Glasbergen	Netherlands
2018	Markus Høiberg	Norway
2019	Kim Soo-hyuk	South Korea
2021	Oskar Eriksson	Sweden
2022	Simone Gonin	Italy
2023	Anton Hood	New Zealand
2024	Chris Plys	United States
2025	Martin Sesaker	Norway
2026	Wilhelm Næss	Norway
2027		
