= Spencer Mugnier =

French curler (born 1972)

- Curler ♂
- Born: 1 December 1972 (age 53); Chamonix, Haute-Savoie, France

Team
- Curling club: Megève CC, Megève, Chamonix CC, Chamonix

Curling career
- Member Association: France
- World Championship: 2 (1992, 2001)
- European Championship: 6 (1995, 1996, 1997, 1998, 2000, 2002)
- Olympic: 1 (2002)
- Other appearances: World Junior Championships: 5 (1990, 1991, 1992, 1993, 1994)
Medal record
Curling
World Junior Championships
Silver medal – second place	1992 Oberstdorf
Bronze medal – third place	1993 Grindelwald

Spencer Mugnier (born 1 December 1972 in Chamonix, Haute-Savoie, France) is a French curler.

He participated at the 2002 Winter Olympics where the French men's team finished in tenth place.

== Awards ==
- Collie Campbell Memorial Award: 2001.

== Teams ==
Season	Skip	Third	Second	Lead	Alternate	Coach	Events
1989–90	Jan Henri Ducroz	Spencer Mugnier	Sylvain Ducroz	Thomas Dufour			WJCC 1990 (9th)
1990–91	Jan Henri Ducroz	Spencer Mugnier	Sylvain Ducroz	Thomas Dufour	Philippe Caux		WJCC 1991 (9th)
1991–92	Jan Henri Ducroz	Spencer Mugnier	Sylvain Ducroz	Thomas Dufour	Philippe Caux		WJCC 1992 (silver)
1991–92	Thierry Mercier (fourth)	Christophe Boan (skip)	Spencer Mugnier	Gerard Ravello			WCC 1992 (10th)
1992–93	Spencer Mugnier	Thomas Dufour	Sylvain Ducroz	Philippe Caux	Cyrille Prunet		WJCC 1993 (bronze)
1993–94	Spencer Mugnier	Thomas Dufour	Sylvain Ducroz	Philippe Caux	Cyrille Prunet		WJCC 1994 (7th)
1995–96	Jan Henri Ducroz	Spencer Mugnier	Daniel Cosetto	Thomas Dufour	Lionel Tournier	Patrick Philippe	ECC 1995 (8th)
1996–97	Jan Henri Ducroz	Spencer Mugnier	Thomas Dufour	Lionel Tournier	Cyrille Prunet		ECC 1996 (13th)
1997–98	Jan Henri Ducroz	Spencer Mugnier	Thomas Dufour	Cyrille Prunet	Lionel Tournier	Raymond Ducroz	ECC 1997 (11th)
1998–99	Jan Henri Ducroz	Spencer Mugnier	Thomas Dufour	Lionel Tournier	Cyrille Prunet	Maurice Dupont-Roc, Andrée Dupont-Roc	ECC 1998 (13th)
2000–01	Dominique Dupont-Roc	Jan Henri Ducroz	Thomas Dufour	Spencer Mugnier	Philippe Caux	Bruno-Denis Dubois	ECC 2000 (7th); WCC 2001 (6th)
2001–02	Dominique Dupont-Roc	Jan Ducroz	Thomas Dufour	Spencer Mugnier	Philippe Caux		WOG 2002 (7th)
2002–03	Dominique Dupont-Roc	Jan Henri Ducroz	Spencer Mugnier	Philippe Caux	Julien Charlet		ECC 2002 (9th)
