= Juhani Heinonen =

Finnish male curler and coach

- Curler ♂
- Born: 19 July 1940 (age 86)

Team
- Curling club: Hyvinkää CC, Hyvinkää

Curling career
- Member Association: Finland
- World Championship: 4 (1988, 1990, 1991, 1992)
- European Championship: 9 (1981, 1985, 1986, 1987, 1988, 1989, 1990, 1991, 1995)
- Other appearances: World Senior Championships: 4 (2008, 2008, 2011, 2018)
Medal record
Curling
Finnish Men's Championship
Gold medal – first place	1985
Gold medal – first place	1986
Gold medal – first place	1987
Gold medal – first place	1988
Gold medal – first place	1989
Gold medal – first place	1990
Gold medal – first place	1991
Gold medal – first place	1995

Juhani Heinonen (born 19 July 1940) is a Finnish male curler and curling coach.

At the national level, he is an eight-time Finnish men's champion curler (1989, 1990, 1992, 1995) and four-time Finnish senior champion curler (2008, 2009, 2011, 2018).

== Teams ==
Season	Skip	Third	Second	Lead	Alternate	Coach	Events
1981–82	Isto Kolemainen	Juhani Heinonen	Pekka Sylvander	Keijo Silvan			ECC 1981 (14th)
1984–85	Jussi Uusipaavalniemi	Petri Tsutsunen	Markku Uusipaavalniemi	Jarmo Jokivalli	Juhani Heinonen		FMCC 1985 (gold)
1985–86	Jussi Uusipaavalniemi	Petri Tsutsunen	Markku Uusipaavalniemi	Jarmo Jokivalli	Juhani Heinonen		ECC 1985 (9th); FMCC 1986 (gold)
1986–87	Jussi Uusipaavalniemi	Jarmo Jokivalli	Markku Uusipaavalniemi	Petri Tsutsunen	Juhani Heinonen		ECC 1986 (11th)
1986–87	Jussi Uusipaavalniemi	Jari Laukkanen	Petri Tsutsunen	Jarmo Jokivalli	Juhani Heinonen		FMCC 1987 (gold)
1987–88	Jussi Uusipaavalniemi	Jarmo Jokivalli	Jari Laukkanen	Petri Tsutsunen	Juhani Heinonen		ECC 1987 (7th)
1987–88	Jussi Uusipaavalniemi	Petri Tsutsunen	Jari Laukkanen	Jarmo Jokivalli	Juhani Heinonen		FMCC 1988 (gold); WCC 1988 (9th)
1988–89	Jussi Uusipaavalniemi	Jarmo Jokivalli	Jari Laukkanen	Petri Tsutsunen	Juhani Heinonen		ECC 1988 (12th)
1988–89	Jussi Uusipaavalniemi	Jari Laukkanen	Jori Aro	Marko Poikolainen	Juhani Heinonen		FMCC 1989 (gold)
1989–90	Jussi Uusipaavalniemi	Jari Laukkanen	Jori Aro	Marko Poikolainen	Juhani Heinonen		ECC 1989 (11th); FMCC 1990 (gold); WCC 1990 (8th)
1990–91	Jussi Uusipaavalniemi	Jari Laukkanen	Jori Aro	Marko Poikolainen	Juhani Heinonen		ECC 1990 (7th); WCC 1991 (10th)
1991–92	Jussi Uusipaavalniemi	Jori Aro	Markku Uusipaavalniemi	Mikko Orrainen	Juhani Heinonen		ECC 1991 (8th); WCC 1992 (5th)
1993–94	Jari Laukkanen	Petri Tsutsunen	Pekka Saarelainen	Marko Latvala	Tommi Valvelainen		ECC 1993 (7th)
1994–95	Jori Aro	Marko Poikolainen	Juhani Heinonen	Riku Raunio			FMCC 1995 (gold)
1995–96	Jori Aro	Marko Poikolainen	Juhani Heinonen	Riku Raunio	Wille Mäkelä		ECC 1995 (12th)
1998–99	Timo Kauste	Yrjö Franssila	Juhani Heinonen	Seppo Malinen	Hannu Rättö		FSCC 1999 (silver)
2002–03	Juhani Heinonen	?	?	?			FSCC 2003 (silver)
2004–05	Juhani Heinonen	?	?	?			FSCC 2005 (bronze)
2007–08	Mauno Nummila	Juhani Heinonen	Ilkka Musto	Lauri Niiranen	Matti Orrainen, Paavo Ruottu		FSCC 2008 (gold)
2007–08	Mauno Nummila	Juhani Heinonen	Ilkka Musto	Paavo Ruottu	Lauri Niiranen		WSCC 2008 (6th)
2008–09	Mauno Nummila	Juhani Heinonen	Paavo Ruottu	Martti K. Salonen	Matti Syrjä		FSCC 2009 (gold); WSCC 2009 (8th)
2009–10	Mauno Nummila	Juhani Heinonen	Kari Ryökäs	Martti K. Salonen	Matti Syrjä		FSCC 2010 (bronze)
2010–11	Timo Kauste	Seppo Malinen	Juhani Heinonen	Jorma Venäläinen	Yrjö Franssila		FSCC 2011 (gold)
2010–11	Timo Kauste	Jorma Venäläinen	Yrjö Franssila	Juhani Heinonen	Seppo Malinen	Kirsti Kauste	WSCC 2011 (14th)
2011–12	Kai Wist	Kari Tuulari	Paavo Ruottu	Juhani Heinonen	Ilkka Musto		FSCC 2012 (4th)
2012–13	Mauno Nummila	Juhani Heinonen	Ilkka Musto	Kai Mellberg	Kari Ryökäs	Juhani Heinonen	FSCC 2013 (5th)
2015–16	Jussi Uusipaavalniemi	Jari Laukkanen	Olavi Malmi	Juhani Heinonen			FSCC 2016 (bronze)
2016–17	Jussi Uusipaavalniemi	Juhani Heinonen	Markku Hämälainen	Jari Laukkanen	Petri Tsutsunen		FSCC 2017 (6th)
2017–18	Jussi Uusipaavalniemi	Jari Laukkanen	Markku Hämälainen	Juhani Heinonen			FSCC 2018 (gold); WSCC 2018 (9th)
2018–19	Jussi Uusipaavalniemi	Juhani Heinonen	Markku Hämäläinen	Hannu Nieminen			FSCC 2019 (10th)
2019–20	Jussi Uusipaavalniemi	Juhani Heinonen	Markku Henttonen	Markku Hämäläinen	Kai Mellberg		FSCC 2020 (silver)

== Record as a coach of national teams ==
Year	Tournament, event	National team	Place
2001	2001 World Junior B Curling Championships	Finland (junior men)	2nd place, silver medalist(s)
2003	2003 World Junior Curling Championships	Finland (junior men)	9
2004	2004 World Junior B Curling Championships	Finland (junior men)	4
2004	2004 World Junior B Curling Championships	Finland (junior women)	8
