= Eric Laffin =

French male curler

- Curler ♂

Team
- Curling club: Club de sports Megève, Megève

Curling career
- Member Association: France
- World Championship: 1 (2000)
- European Championship: 3 (1999, 2001, 2004)
Medal record
Curling

Eric Laffin is a French curler.

== Teams ==
| Season | Skip | Third | Second | Lead | Alternate | Coach | Events |
|---|---|---|---|---|---|---|---|
| 1994–95 | Cyrille Prunet | Eric Laffin | Vincent Lefebvre | Mathias Guenoun | Philippe Caux | | WJCC 1995 (10th) |
| 1999–00 | Thierry Mercier | Cyrille Prunet | Eric Laffin | Gerard Ravello | Lionel Tournier | | ECC 1999 (7th); WCC 2000 (9th) |
| 2001–02 | Thierry Mercier | Cyrille Prunet | Eric Laffin | Lionel Tournier | | | ECC 2001 (7th) |
| 2004–05 | Thierry Mercier | Cyrille Prunet | Eric Laffin | Jérémy Frarier | Thomas Dufour | Robert Biondina | ECC 2004 (10th) |
