= Thierry Mercier =

French curler and coach (born 1967)

- Curler ♂
- Born: 1 May 1967 (age 59); Sallanches, Haute-Savoie, France

Team
- Curling club: Club de sports Megève, Megève

Curling career
- Member Association: France
- World Championship: 6 (1986, 1988, 1989, 1991, 1992, 2000)
- World Mixed Doubles Championship: 1 (2015)
- European Championship: 10 (1984, 1985, 1987, 1990, 1991, 1993, 1994, 1999, 2001, 2004)
- Olympic: 1 (1992 - demo)
- Other appearances: World Mixed Championship: 1 (2015), European Mixed Championship: 1 (2007), World Junior Championships: 4 (1983, 1984, 1986, 1988)
Medal record
Curling
French Men's Championship
Gold medal – first place	1999
Gold medal – first place	2001
Gold medal – first place	2004
Gold medal – first place	2007

Thierry Mercier (born 1967 May 1) is a French curler and curling coach.

At the national level, he is a four-time French men's champion.

He participated in the demonstration curling events at the 1992 Winter Olympics, where the French men's team finished in sixth place.

== Teams ==
=== Men's ===
Season	Skip	Third	Second	Lead	Alternate	Coach	Events
1982–83	Dominique Dupont-Roc	Patrick Philippe	Christian Dupont-Roc	Thierry Mercier			WJCC 1983 (9th)
1983–84	Dominique Dupont-Roc	Philippe Pomi	Christian Dupont-Roc	Thierry Mercier			WJCC 1984 (8th)
1984–85	Maurice Mercier	Thierry Mercier	Jacques Joulien	Emile Pomi			ECC 1984 (11th)
1985–86	Lionel Tournier	Thierry Mercier	Jean-Francois Delavay	Pascal Coppel			WJCC 1986 (9th)
1985–86	Dominique Dupont-Roc	Christian Dupont-Roc	Thierry Mercier	Daniel Cosetto (ECC); Patrick Philippe (WCC)			ECC 1985 (11th); WCC 1986 (7th)
1987–88	Christophe Boan	Gerard Ravello	Alain Brangi	Thierry Mercier			ECC 1987 (12th)
1987–88	Thierry Mercier	Lionel Tournier	Christian Cossetto	René-Georges Wohlfei	Jan Henri Ducroz		WJCC 1988 (9th)
1987–88	Christophe Boan	Thierry Mercier	Gerard Ravello	Alain Brangi			WCC 1988 (7th)
1988–89	Dominique Dupont-Roc	Christian Dupont-Roc	Daniel Cosetto	Patrick Philippe	Thierry Mercier		WCC 1989 (9th)
1990–91	Thierry Mercier	Daniel Cosetto	Lionel Tournier	Laurent Flenghi	Joel Indergand		ECC 1990 (6th)
1990–91	Dominique Dupont-Roc	Claude Feige	Thierry Mercier	Patrick Philippe	Daniel Moratelli		WCC 1991 (9th)
1991–92	Dominique Dupont-Roc	Claude Feige	Patrick Philippe	Daniel Moratelli	Thierry Mercier		ECC 1991 (5th)
1991–92	Dominique Dupont-Roc	Claude Feige	Patrick Philippe	Thierry Mercier	Daniel Moratelli		WOG 1992 (demo) (6th)
1991–92	Thierry Mercier (fourth)	Christophe Boan (skip)	Spencer Mugnier	Gerard Ravello			WCC 1992 (10th)
1993–94	Jan Henri Ducroz	Christian Dupont-Roc	Lionel Tournier	Cyrille Prunet	Thierry Mercier		ECC 1993 (6th)
1994–95	Thierry Mercier (fourth)	Christophe Boan (skip)	Patrick Philippe	Gerard Ravello	Lionel Tournier	Michel Jeannot	ECC 1994 (13th)
1999–00	Thierry Mercier	Cyrille Prunet	Eric Laffin	Gerard Ravello	Lionel Tournier		ECC 1999 (7th); WCC 2000 (9th)
2001–02	Thierry Mercier	Cyrille Prunet	Eric Laffin	Lionel Tournier			ECC 2001 (7th)
2004–05	Thierry Mercier	Cyrille Prunet	Eric Laffin	Jérémy Frarier	Thomas Dufour	Robert Biondina	ECC 2004 (10th)
2017–18	Theo Ducroz	Quentin Morard	Eddy Mercier	Killian Gaudin	Thierry Mercier	Noel Morard	ECC 2017 (C division) (2nd)

=== Mixed ===
Season	Skip	Third	Second	Lead	Events
2007–08	Thierry Mercier	Fabienne Morand	Patrick Boez	Marie-Pierre D'Espezel de Roquetaillade	EMxCC 2007 (18th)
2015–16	Thierry Mercier	Sandrine Morand	Romain Borini	Catherine Emberger	WMxCC 2015 (15th)

=== Mixed doubles ===
Season	Female	Male	Events
2014–15	Catherine Emberger	Thierry Mercier	WMDCC 2015 (21st)

== Record as a coach of national teams ==
Year	Tournament, event	National team	Place
1992	1992 World Junior Curling Championships	France (junior women)	7
1992	1992 European Curling Championships	France (men)	5
1993	1993 World Junior Curling Championships	France (junior women)	8
1993	1993 World Men's Curling Championship	France (men)	10
2000	2000 World Junior Curling Championships	France (junior women)	10
2001	2001 World Junior B Curling Championships	France (junior women)	5
2002	2002 European Curling Championships	Spain (men)	18
2002	2002 European Curling Championships	Spain (women)	18
2003	2003 European Curling Championships	Spain (men)	19
2017	2017 World Junior B Curling Championships	France (junior men)	11
2017	2017 European Curling Championships	France (men)	17
2018	2018 World Junior B Curling Championships	France (junior men)	13
2018	2018 European Curling Championships	France (men)	26
2019	2019 World Junior-B Curling Championships (January)	France (junior men)	5
2019	2019 European Curling Championships (C division)	France (women)	6
2019	2019 European Curling Championships	France (men)	20
2019	2019 World Junior-B Curling Championships (December)	France (junior men)	4
2020	2020 Winter Youth Olympics (mixed)	France (mixed)	23
2020	2020 Winter Youth Olympics (mixed doubles); Chana Beitone (FRA) / Nikolai Lysakov (RUS)	France/Russia	2nd place, silver medalist(s)

== Personal life ==
Thierry Mercier is from family of curlers: his mother Agnès Mercier is known French curler, many times French women's champion, she competed on 1988 Winter Olympics, number of World and European championships. Thierry's older sister is Annick Mercier, curler, many times French champion, she competed on 1988 and 1992 Winter Olympics, number of Worlds and Euros.
