= Jori Aro =

Finnish curler

- Curler ♂

Team
- Curling club: Hyvinkää CC, Hyvinkää

Curling career
- Member Association: Finland
- World Championship: 3 (1990, 1991, 1992)
- European Championship: 4 (1989, 1990, 1991, 1995)
Medal record
Curling
Finnish Men's Championship
Gold medal – first place	1989
Gold medal – first place	1990
Gold medal – first place	1991
Gold medal – first place	1995

Jori Aro is a Finnish curler.

At the national level, he is a four-time Finnish men's champion curler (1989, 1990, 1991, 1995).

== Teams ==
Season	Skip	Third	Second	Lead	Alternate	Events
1988–89	Jussi Uusipaavalniemi	Jari Laukkanen	Jori Aro	Marko Poikolainen	Juhani Heinonen	FMCC 1989 (gold)
1989–90	Jussi Uusipaavalniemi	Jari Laukkanen	Jori Aro	Marko Poikolainen	Juhani Heinonen	ECC 1989 (11th); FMCC 1990 (gold); WCC 1990 (8th)
1990–91	Jussi Uusipaavalniemi	Jari Laukkanen	Jori Aro	Marko Poikolainen	Juhani Heinonen	ECC 1990 (7th); WCC 1991 (10th)
1990–91	Jussi Uusipaavalniemi	Jori Aro	Markku Uusipaavalniemi	Mikko Orrainen	Juhani Heinonen	FMCC 1991 (gold)
1991–92	Jussi Uusipaavalniemi	Jori Aro	Markku Uusipaavalniemi	Mikko Orrainen	Juhani Heinonen	ECC 1991 (8 место); WCC 1992 (5th)
1994–95	Jori Aro	Marko Poikolainen	Juhani Heinonen	Riku Raunio		FMCC 1995 (gold)
1995–96	Jori Aro	Marko Poikolainen	Juhani Heinonen	Riku Raunio	Wille Mäkelä	ECC 1995 (12th)
1998–99	Jori Aro	?	?	?		FMCC 1999 (5th)
2000–01	Jori Aro	?	?	?		FMCC 2001 (5th)
2001–02	Jori Aro	?	?	?		FMCC 2002 (11th)
