= Jussi Uusipaavalniemi =

Finnish curler (born 1965)

- Curler ♂
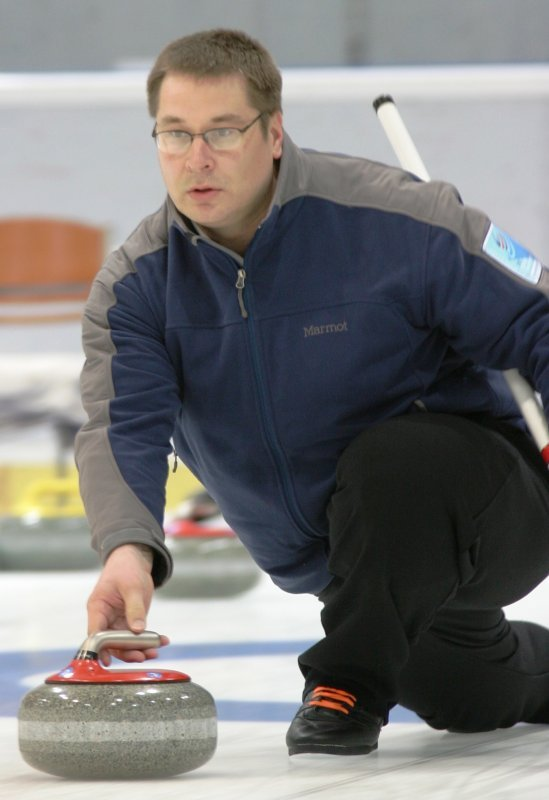
- Born: 19 June 1965 (age 61); Hyvinkää, Finland

Team
- Curling club: Hyvinkää CC

Curling career
- Member Association: Finland
- World Championship: 6 (1988, 1990, 1991, 1992, 1997, 1998)
- World Mixed Doubles Championship: 3 (2008, 2009, 2012)
- World Mixed Championship: 2 (2017, 2024)
- European Championship: 10 (1985, 1986, 1987, 1988, 1989, 1990, 1991, 1994, 1996, 1997)
- Other appearances: European Mixed Championship: 5 (2006, 2007, 2008, 2009, 2011), World Senior Championships: 1 (2018)
Medal record
Curling
World Championships
Bronze medal – third place	1998 Kamloops
World Mixed Doubles Championship
Silver medal – second place	2008 Vierumäki
Finnish Men's Championship
Gold medal – first place	1985
Gold medal – first place	1986
Gold medal – first place	1987
Gold medal – first place	1988
Gold medal – first place	1989
Gold medal – first place	1990
Gold medal – first place	1994
Gold medal – first place	1996
Gold medal – first place	1997
Silver medal – second place	1984
Silver medal – second place	2008
Silver medal – second place	2012
Bronze medal – third place	2000
Bronze medal – third place	2001
Bronze medal – third place	2002
Bronze medal – third place	2011

Jussi Uusipaavalniemi (Finnish pronunciation: [ˈjusːi ˈuːsiˌpɑːʋɑlˌnie̯mi]; born 19 June 1965 in Hyvinkää, Finland) is a Finnish male curler.

He started curling in 1979 at the age of 14.

He is the brother of Finnish male curler Markku Uusipaavalniemi.

== Awards ==
- Collie Campbell Memorial Award: 1992, 1997.

== Teams ==
=== Men's ===
Season	Skip	Third	Second	Lead	Alternate	Coach	Events
1983–84	Markku Hämäläinen	Jussi Uusipaavalniemi	Petri Tsutsunen	Jarmo Jokivalli			FMCC 1984 (silver)
1984–85	Jussi Uusipaavalniemi	Petri Tsutsunen	Markku Uusipaavalniemi	Jarmo Jokivalli	Juhani Heinonen		FMCC 1985 (gold)
1985–86	Jussi Uusipaavalniemi	Petri Tsutsunen	Markku Uusipaavalniemi	Jarmo Jokivalli	Juhani Heinonen		ECC 1985 (9th); FMCC 1986 (gold)
1986–87	Jussi Uusipaavalniemi	Jarmo Jokivalli	Markku Uusipaavalniemi	Petri Tsutsunen	Juhani Heinonen		ECC 1986 (11th)
1986–87	Jussi Uusipaavalniemi	Jari Laukkanen	Petri Tsutsunen	Jarmo Jokivalli	Juhani Heinonen		FMCC 1987 (gold)
1987–88	Jussi Uusipaavalniemi	Jarmo Jokivalli	Jari Laukkanen	Petri Tsutsunen	Juhani Heinonen		ECC 1987 (7th)
1987–88	Jussi Uusipaavalniemi	Petri Tsutsunen	Jari Laukkanen	Jarmo Jokivalli	Juhani Heinonen		FMCC 1988 (gold); WCC 1988 (9th)
1988–89	Jussi Uusipaavalniemi	Jarmo Jokivalli	Jari Laukkanen	Petri Tsutsunen	Juhani Heinonen		ECC 1988 (12th)
1988–89	Jussi Uusipaavalniemi	Jari Laukkanen	Jori Aro	Marko Poikolainen	Juhani Heinonen		FMCC 1989 (gold)
1989–90	Jussi Uusipaavalniemi	Jari Laukkanen	Jori Aro	Marko Poikolainen	Juhani Heinonen		ECC 1989 (11th); FMCC 1990 (gold); WCC 1990 (8th)
1990–91	Jussi Uusipaavalniemi	Jari Laukkanen	Jori Aro	Marko Poikolainen	Juhani Heinonen		ECC 1990 (7th); WCC 1991 (10th)
1991–92	Jussi Uusipaavalniemi	Jori Aro	Markku Uusipaavalniemi	Mikko Orrainen	Juhani Heinonen		ECC 1991 (8th); WCC 1992 (5th)
1993–94	Tomi Rantamäki	Jussi Uusipaavalniemi	Jussi Heinonsalo	Markku Henttonen			FMCC 1994 (gold)
1994–95	Tomi Rantamäki	Jussi Uusipaavalniemi	Jussi Heinonsalo	Markku Henttonen	Pekka Saarelainen	Anders Thidholm	ECC 1994 (9th)
1995–96	Markku Uusipaavalniemi	Jussi Uusipaavalniemi	Raimo Lind	Hannu Nieminen	Jouni Weckman		FMCC 1996 (gold)
1996–97	Markku Uusipaavalniemi	Jussi Uusipaavalniemi	Raimo Lind	Wille Mäkelä			ECC 1996 (7th)
1996–97	Markku Uusipaavalniemi	Wille Mäkelä	Tommi Häti	Jari Laukkanen	Jussi Uusipaavalniemi		FMCC 1997 (gold)
1996–97	Markku Uusipaavalniemi	Wille Mäkelä	Jussi Uusipaavalniemi	Tommi Häti	Jouni Weckman		WCC 1997 (10th)
1997–98	Markku Uusipaavalniemi	Wille Mäkelä	Jussi Uusipaavalniemi	Tommi Häti	Jari Laukkanen		ECC 1997 (6th)
1997–98	Markku Uusipaavalniemi	Wille Mäkelä	Tommi Häti	Jari Laukkanen	Jussi Uusipaavalniemi		WCC 1998 (bronze)
1998–99	Jussi Uusipaavalniemi	Miska Arminen	Jukka Savonen	Markku Henttonen	Heikki Virtanen		FMCC 1999 (4th)
1999–00	Jussi Uusipaavalniemi	Miska Arminen	Jukka Savonen	Markku Henttonen	Heikki Virtanen		FMCC 2000 (bronze)
2000–01	Jussi Uusipaavalniemi	Miska Arminen	Jukka Savonen	Markku Henttonen	Heikki Virtanen		FMCC 2001 (bronze)
2001–02	Jussi Uusipaavalniemi	Miska Arminen	Jukka Savonen	Markku Henttonen	Heikki Virtanen		FMCC 2002 (bronze)
2002–03	Jussi Uusipaavalniemi	Jukka Savonen	Miska Arminen	Heikki Virtanen	Petri Tsutsunen, Tommi Vahvelainen		FMCC 2003 (8th)
2003–04	Jussi Uusipaavalniemi	Miska Arminen	?	?	?		FMCC 2004 (5th)
2006–07	Jussi Uusipaavalniemi	Jukka Savonen	Petri Tsutsunen	Miska Arminen	Perttu Piilo, Paavo Kuosmanen		FMCC 2007 (5th)
2007–08	Jussi Uusipaavalniemi	Paavo Kuosmanen	Perttu Piilo	Petri Tsutsunen	Jukka Savonen		FMCC 2008 (silver)
2008–09	Jussi Uusipaavalniemi	Perttu Piilo	Paavo Kuosmanen	Petri Tsutsunen	Jukka Savonen		FMCC 2009 (5th)
2009–10	Tomi Rantamäki	Timo Patrikka	Jermu Pöllänen	Lauri Ikävalko	Jussi Uusipaavalniemi	Tomi Rantamäki	FMCC 2010 (5th)
2010–11	Tomi Rantamäki	Kimmo Ilvonen	Lauri Ikavalko	Timo Patrikka	Jermu Pöllänen, Jussi Uusipaavalniemi		FMCC 2011 (bronze)
2011–12	Tomi Rantamäki	Kimmo Ilvonen	Timo Patrikka	Pekka Peura	Jermu Pöllänen, Jussi Uusipaavalniemi		FMCC 2012 (silver)
2012–13	Jussi Uusipaavalniemi	Toni Sepperi	Jere Sullanmaa	Markus Kaustinen	Jukka Savonen, Kasper Hakunti		FMCC 2013 (5th)
2012–13	Tomi Rantamäki	Jussi Uusipaavalniemi	Pekka Peura	Jermu Pöllänen			
2013–14	Jussi Uusipaavalniemi	Jukka Savonen	Markus Kaustinen	Petri Tsutsunen	Petri Manninen, Jouni Weckman		FMCC 2014 (7th)
2015–16	Jussi Uusipaavalniemi	Jari Laukkanen	Olavi Malmi	Juhani Heinonen			FSMCC 2016 (bronze)
2016–17	Jussi Uusipaavalniemi	Juhani Heinonen	Markku Hämälainen	Jari Laukkanen	Petri Tsutsunen		FSMCC 2017 (6th)
2017–18	Jussi Uusipaavalniemi	Jari Laukkanen	Markku Hämälainen	Juhani Heinonen			FSMCC 2018 (gold); WSCC 2018 (9th)
2018–19	Jussi Uusipaavalniemi	Juhani Heinonen	Markku Hämäläinen	Hannu Nieminen			FSMCC 2019 (10th)
2019–20	Jussi Uusipaavalniemi	Juhani Heinonen	Markku Henttonen	Markku Hämäläinen	Kai Mellberg		FSMCC 2020 (silver)

=== Mixed ===
Season	Skip	Third	Second	Lead	Alternate	Coach	Events
2005	Jussi Uusipaavalniemi	Anne Malmi	Petri Tsutsunen	Johanna Pyyhtiä			FMxCC 2005 (bronze)
2006	Jussi Uusipaavalniemi	Anne Malmi	Petri Tsutsunen	Johanna Pyyhtiä	Olavi Malmi (EMxCC)		FMxCC 2006 (gold); EMxCC 2006 (6th)
2007	Jussi Uusipaavalniemi	Johanna Pyyhtiä	Petri Tsutsunen	Anne Malmi	Teemu Salo (FMxCC); Olavi Malmi (EMxCC)		FMxCC 2007 (gold); EMxCC 2007 (10th)
2008	Jussi Uusipaavalniemi	Kirsi Kaski (FMxCC); Jaana Hämäläinen (EMxCC)	Paavo Kuosmanen	Jaana Hämäläinen (EMxCC); Kirsi Kaski (EMxCC)	Minna Uusipaavalniemi (EMxCC)		FMxCC 2008 (gold); EMxCC 2008 (11th)
2009	Jussi Uusipaavalniemi	Kirsi Kaski (FMxCC); Jaana Hämäläinen (EMxCC)	Paavo Kuosmanen	Jaana Hämäläinen (EMxCC); Kirsi Kaski (EMxCC)			FMxCC 2009 (gold); EMxCC 2009 (7th)
2010	Jussi Uusipaavalniemi	Kirsi Kaski	Paavo Kuosmanen	Jaana Hämäläinen			FMxCC 2010 (5th)
2011	Jussi Uusipaavalniemi	Kirsi Kaski (FMxCC); Jaana Hämäläinen (EMxCC)	Paavo Kuosmanen	Jaana Hämäläinen (FMxCC); Kirsi Kaski (EMxCC)			FMxCC 2011 (gold); EMxCC 2011 (8th)
2012	Jussi Uusipaavalniemi	Kirsi Kaski	Paavo Kuosmanen	Jaana Hämäläinen			FMxCC 2012 (5th)
2013	Jussi Uusipaavalniemi	Jaana Hämäläinen	Paavo Kuosmanen	Kirsi Kaski	Katja Kiiskinen		FMxCC 2013 (5th)
2014	Jussi Uusipaavalniemi	Paavo Kuosmanen	Jaana Hämäläinen	Katja Kiiskinen			FMxCC 2014 (silver)
2015	Jussi Uusipaavalniemi	Johanna Pyyhtiä	Paavo Kuosmanen	Elina Virtaala			FMxCC 2015 (5th)
2016	Jussi Uusipaavalniemi	Laura Kitti	Paavo Kuosmanen	Johanna Pyyhtiä			FMxCC 2016 (4th)
2017	Jussi Uusipaavalniemi	Laura Kitti	Paavo Kuosmanen	Johanna Pyyhtiä		Jaana Hakkinen	FMxCC 2017 (gold); WMxCC 2017 (32nd)
2018	Jussi Uusipaavalniemi	Laura Kitti	Paavo Kuosmanen	Johanna Pyyhtiä			FMxCC 2018 (bronze)
2019	Jussi Uusipaavalniemi	Laura Kitti	Paavo Kuosmanen	Johanna Pyyhtiä			FMxCC 2019 (silver)

=== Mixed doubles ===
Season	Male	Female	Events
2007–08	Jussi Uusipaavalniemi	Anne Malmi	FMDCC 2008 (gold); WMDCC 2008 (silver)
2008–09	Jussi Uusipaavalniemi	Jaana Hämäläinen	FMDCC 2009 (gold); WMDCC 2009 (5th)
2009–10	Jussi Uusipaavalniemi	Jaana Hämäläinen	FMDCC 2010 (10th)
2010–11	Jussi Uusipaavalniemi	Jaana Hämäläinen	FMDCC 2011 (4th)
2011–12	Jussi Uusipaavalniemi	Jaana Hämäläinen	FMDCC 2012 (gold); WMDCC 2012 (14th)
2012–13	Jussi Uusipaavalniemi	Nina Pöllänen	FMDCC 2013 (5th)
2013–14	Jussi Uusipaavalniemi	Jaana Hämäläinen	FMDCC 2014 (4th)
2014–15	Jussi Uusipaavalniemi	Laura Kitti	FMDCC 2015 (7th)
2015–16	Jussi Uusipaavalniemi	Nina Pöllänen	FMDCC 2016 (4th)
