= Jarmo Jokivalli =

Finnish male curler

- Curler ♂

Team
- Curling club: Hyvinkää CC, Hyvinkää

Curling career
- Member Association: Finland
- World Championship: 1 (1988)
- European Championship: 4 (1985, 1986, 1987, 1988)
Medal record
Curling
Finnish Men's Championship
Gold medal – first place	1985
Gold medal – first place	1986
Gold medal – first place	1987
Gold medal – first place	1988

Jarmo "Lamu" Jokivalli is a Finnish male curler.

At the national level, he is a four-time Finnish men's champion curler (1985, 1986, 1987, 1988).

== Teams ==
Season	Skip	Third	Second	Lead	Alternate	Events
1983–84	Markku Hämäläinen	Jussi Uusipaavalniemi	Petri Tsutsunen	Jarmo Jokivalli		FMCC 1984 (silver)
1984–85	Jussi Uusipaavalniemi	Petri Tsutsunen	Markku Uusipaavalniemi	Jarmo Jokivalli	Juhani Heinonen	FMCC 1985 (gold)
1985–86	Jussi Uusipaavalniemi	Petri Tsutsunen	Markku Uusipaavalniemi	Jarmo Jokivalli	Juhani Heinonen	ECC 1985 (9th); FMCC 1986 (gold)
1986–87	Jussi Uusipaavalniemi	Jarmo Jokivalli	Markku Uusipaavalniemi	Petri Tsutsunen	Juhani Heinonen	ECC 1986 (11th)
1986–87	Jussi Uusipaavalniemi	Jari Laukkanen	Petri Tsutsunen	Jarmo Jokivalli	Juhani Heinonen	FMCC 1987 (gold)
1987–88	Jussi Uusipaavalniemi	Jarmo Jokivalli	Jari Laukkanen	Petri Tsutsunen	Juhani Heinonen	ECC 1987 (7th)
1987–88	Jussi Uusipaavalniemi	Petri Tsutsunen	Jari Laukkanen	Jarmo Jokivalli	Juhani Heinonen	FMCC 1988 (gold); WCC 1988 (9th)
1988–89	Jussi Uusipaavalniemi	Jarmo Jokivalli	Jari Laukkanen	Petri Tsutsunen	Juhani Heinonen	ECC 1988 (12th)
