= 1988 European Curling Championships =

- Host city: Perth, Scotland
- Arena: Perth Ice Rink
- Dates: 6–10 December
- Men's winner: Scotland
- Skip: David Smith
- Third: Mike Hay
- Second: Peter Smith
- Lead: David Hay
- Finalist: Norway (Eigil Ramsfjell)
- Women's winner: Sweden
- Curling club: Karlstads CK, Karlstad
- Skip: Elisabeth Högström
- Third: Anette Norberg
- Second: Monika Jansson
- Lead: Marie Henriksson
- Finalist: Scotland (Hazel McGregor)

The 1988 European Curling Championships were held from 6 to 10 December at the Perth Ice Rink arena in Perth, Scotland.

The Scottish men's team skipped by David Smith won their fourth title and the Swedish women's team skipped by Elisabeth Högström won their seventh title.

For the first time, the men's team of Belgium took part in the European Championship.

== Men ==
=== Teams ===
Country	Skip	Third	Second	Lead	Alternate	Curling club, city
Austria	Alois Kreidl	Günther Mochny	Dieter Küchenmeister	Stefan Salinger		Kitzbühel CC, Kitzbühel
Belgium	Marcel Marién	Pierre Mallants	Eric Biehels	Arthur Westerlinck		
Denmark	Christian Thune	Niels Siggaard	Ole Lehmann de Neergard	Finn Nielsen		
England	John Deakin	Gordon Vickers	Malcolm Richardson	Peter Bowyer		
Finland	Jussi Uusipaavalniemi	Jarmo Jokivalli	Jari Laukkanen	Petri Tsutsunen	Juhani Heinonen	Hyvinkää CC, Hyvinkää
France	Dominique Dupont-Roc	Christian Dupont-Roc	Daniel Cosetto	Patrick Philippe		
Italy	Fabio Alverà	Stefano Morona	Adriano Lorenzi	Stefano Zardini		
Netherlands	Robert van der Cammen	Wim Neeleman	Rob Joosen	Fred Melker		
Norway	Eigil Ramsfjell	Sjur Loen	Morten Søgaard	Dagfinn Loen		Snarøyen CC, Oslo
Scotland	David Smith	Mike Hay	Peter Smith	David Hay		
Sweden	Claes Roxin	Mats Brisegård	Björn Roxin	Lars-Eric Roxin		CK Ena, Enköping
Switzerland	Bernhard Attinger	Werner Attinger	Martin Zürrer	Marcel Senn		Dübendorf CC, Dübendorf
Wales	John Hunt	John Stone	John Guyan	Michael Hunt		
West Germany	Keith Wendorf	Sven Saile	Uwe Saile	Gregor Kunzemüller		CC Schwenningen, Schwenningen

=== First Phase (Triple Knockout) ===
==== Round 1 ====
Two teams promoted to Second Phase

Game 1		Game 2		Game 3
		Sweden	10
Netherlands	5	Austria	2
Austria	10			Sweden	3
West Germany	2			West Germany	8
Wales	2	West Germany	6
Denmark	8	Denmark	1
France	4

Game 1		Game 2		Game 3
		Norway	9
Finland	3	Italy	3
Italy	8			Norway	8
Switzerland	17			Scotland	3
Belgium	3	Switzerland	3
Scotland	7	Scotland	4
England	3

==== Round 2 ====
Three teams promoted to Second Phase

Game 1		Game 2		Game 3
				Sweden	7
				England	5
		Finland	4
Belgium	3	England	9
England	10

Game 1		Game 2		Game 3
				Scotland	5
				France	4
		Netherlands	4
Wales	5	France	7
France	10

Game 1		Game 2
Austria	3
Denmark	8	Denmark	5
Italy	7	Italy	6
Switzerland	3

==== Round 3 ====
Three teams promoted to Second Phase

Game 1		Game 2
		England	3
Switzerland	5	Switzerland	7
Wales	2

Game 1		Game 2
		Denmark	8
Netherlands	5	Finland	1
Finland	7

Game 1		Game 2
		France	10
Austria	11	Austria	7
Belgium	3

=== Second Phase (Double Knockout) ===
==== Round 1 ====
Two teams promoted to Playoffs

Game 1
West Germany	3
Denmark	6
Sweden	2
Scotland	5

Game 2
Denmark	2
Scotland	8

Game 1
Norway	5
Switzerland	3
Italy	6
France	7

Game 2
Norway	7
France	2

==== Round 2 ====
Two teams promoted to Playoffs

Game 1		Game 2
		France	3
West Germany	5	Sweden	6
Sweden	9

Game 1		Game 2
		Denmark	5
Switzerland	6	Switzerland	8
Italy	5

=== Placement Phase ===
==== Range 9-14 ====
Quarterfinals (9-14)
England	12
Belgium	3
Wales	3
Netherlands	6

Semifinals (9-14)
England	8
Finland	7
Austria	10
Netherlands	6

Final for 9th place
England	8
Austria	9

Semifinals (11-14)
Finland	9
Wales	3
Netherlands	9
Belgium	4

Final for 11th place
Finland	4
Netherlands	9
Match for 13th place
Wales	7
Belgium	2

==== Range 5-8 ====
Final for 5th place
France	4
Denmark	3

Final for 7th place
West Germany	5
Italy	2

=== Playoffs ===
Semifinals
1	Switzerland	3
4	Norway	7
2	Sweden	2
Scotland	3

Final
Norway	3
Scotland	6
Bronze Medal Game
Switzerland	5
Sweden	2

=== Final standings ===
Place	Country	Skip	Games	Wins	Losses
1st place, gold medalist(s)	Scotland	David Smith	8	7	1
2nd place, silver medalist(s)	Norway	Eigil Ramsfjell	6	5	1
3rd place, bronze medalist(s)	Switzerland	Bernhard Attinger	10	6	4
4	Sweden	Claes Roxin	8	4	4
5	France	Dominique Dupont-Roc	9	5	4
6	Denmark	Christian Thune	9	4	5
7	West Germany	Keith Wendorf	6	4	2
8	Italy	Fabio Alverà	7	3	4
9	Austria	Alois Kreidl	7	4	3
10	England	John Deakin	8	4	4
11	Netherlands	Robert van der Cammen	7	3	4
12	Finland	Jussi Uusipaavalniemi	7	2	5
13	Wales	John Hunt	6	1	5
14	Belgium	Marcel Marién	6	0	6

== Women ==
=== Teams ===
Country	Skip	Third	Second	Lead	Alternate	Curling club, city
Austria	Inge Lamprecht	Jutta Kober	Elke Lamprecht	Karin Egger		
Denmark	Marianne Qvist	Lene Bidstrup	Astrid Birnbaum	Linda Laursen		
England	Joan Reed	Moira Davison	Christine Short	Margaret Martin		Glendale CC, Northumberland
Finland	Jaana Jokela	Terhi Aro	Nina Ahvenainen	Carita Säilä	Tiina Majuri	
France	Agnes Mercier	Annick Mercier	Andrée Dupont-Roc	Catherine Lefebvre		
Italy	Ann Lacedelli	Francesca Del Fabbro	Emanuela Sarto	Loredana Siorpaes		
Netherlands	Laura Van Imhoff	Gerrie Veening	Jenny Bovenschen	Mirjam Gast		
Norway	Trine Trulsen	Dordi Nordby	Hanne Pettersen	Mette Halvorsen		Snarøyen CC, Oslo
Scotland	Hazel McGregor	Edith Loudon	Fiona Bayne	Katie Loudon		
Sweden	Elisabeth Högström	Anette Norberg	Monika Jansson	Marie Henriksson		Karlstads CK, Karlstad
Switzerland	Cristina Lestander	Barbara Meier	Ingrid Thulin	Katrin Peterhans		
West Germany	Stephanie Mayr	Simone Vogel	Sabine Belkofer	Hatti Foster		

=== First Phase (Triple Knockout) ===
==== Round 1 ====
Two teams promoted to Second Phase

Game 1
Scotland	2
Denmark	10
Switzerland	13
Italy	2

Game 2
West Germany	6
Denmark	5
France	4
Switzerland	7

Game 3
West Germany	6
Switzerland	5

Game 1
Austria	11
England	8
Finland	8
Netherlands	4

Game 2
Sweden	13
Austria	5
Norway	15
Finland	6

Game 3
Sweden	8
Norway	4

==== Round 2 ====
Three teams promoted to Second Phase

Game 1		Game 2		Game 3
				Denmark	5
				Finland	2
		Austria	5
Denmark	8	Finland	8
France	7

Game 1		Game 2
		Norway	2
Scotland	7	Scotland	9
Italy	2

Game 1		Game 2
		Switzerland	11
Netherlands	9	Netherlands	1
England	7

==== Round 3 ====
Three teams promoted to Second Phase

Game 1		Game 2
		Finland	9
Italy	0	England	10
England	11

Game 1
Netherlands	9
Austria	7

Game 1
Norway	7
France	1

=== Second Phase (Double Knockout) ===
==== Round 1 ====
Two teams promoted to Playoffs

Game 1
West Germany	10
England	3
Switzerland	5
Scotland	3

Game 2
West Germany	5
Switzerland	7

Game 1
Sweden	14
Netherlands	6
Denmark	3
Norway	7

Game 2
Sweden	7
Norway	2

==== Round 2 ====
Two teams promoted to Playoffs

Game 1		Game 2
		Norway	3
England	0	Scotland	6
Scotland	9

Game 1		Game 2
		West Germany	6
Netherlands	2	Denmark	7
Denmark	8

=== Placement Phase ===
==== Range 9-12 ====
Semifinals (9-12)
Austria	7
Finland	6
France	6
Italy	5

Final for 9th place
Austria	8
France	7
Final for 11th place
Finland	6
Italy	8

==== Range 5-8 ====
Final for 5th place
Norway	8
West Germany	2

Final for 7th place
England	11
Netherlands	14

=== Playoffs ===
Semifinals
1	Denmark	4
4	Sweden	8
2	Scotland	7
3	Switzerland	6

Final
Sweden	5
Scotland	4
Bronze Medal Game
Denmark	5
Switzerland	6

=== Final standings ===
Place	Country	Skip	Games	Wins	Losses
1st place, gold medalist(s)	Sweden	Elisabeth Högström	6	6	0
2nd place, silver medalist(s)	Scotland	Hazel McGregor	8	5	3
3rd place, bronze medalist(s)	Switzerland	Cristina Lestander	8	6	2
4	Denmark	Marianne Qvist	9	5	4
5	Norway	Trine Trulsen	8	4	4
6	West Germany	Stephanie Mayr	6	3	3
7	Netherlands	Laura Van Imhoff	7	3	4
8	England	Joan Reed	7	2	5
9	Austria	Inge Lamprecht	6	3	3
10	France	Agnes Mercier	5	1	4
11	Italy	Ann Lacedelli	5	1	4
12	Finland	Jaana Jokela	7	2	5
