= Jouni Weckman =

Finnish male curler

- Curler ♂

Team
- Curling club: Hyvinkään Curling ry, Hyvinkää

Curling career
- Member Association: Finland
- World Championship: 1 (1997)
Medal record
Curling
Finnish Men's Championship
Gold medal – first place	1996

Jouni Weckman is a Finnish curler.

At the national level, he is a 1996 Finnish men's champion curler.

== Teams ==
Season	Skip	Third	Second	Lead	Alternate	Events
1995–96	Markku Uusipaavalniemi	Jussi Uusipaavalniemi	Raimo Lind	Hannu Nieminen	Jouni Weckman	FMCC 1996 (gold)
1996–97	Markku Uusipaavalniemi	Wille Mäkelä	Jussi Uusipaavalniemi	Tommi Häti	Jouni Weckman	WCC 1997 (10th)
2013–14	Jussi Uusipaavalniemi	Jukka Savonen	Markus Kaustinen	Petri Tsutsunen	Petri Manninen, Jouni Weckman	FMCC 2014 (7th)
