= Marko Poikolainen =

Finnish curler

- Curler ♂

Team
- Curling club: Hyvinkää CC, Hyvinkää

Curling career
- Member Association: Finland
Medal record
Curling
Finnish Men's Championship
Gold medal – first place	1989
Gold medal – first place	1990
Gold medal – first place	1992
Gold medal – first place	1995

Marko Poikolainen is a Finnish curler.

At the national level, he is a four-time Finnish men's champion curler (1989, 1990, 1992, 1995).

== Teams ==
Season	Skip	Third	Second	Lead	Alternate	Events
1988–89	Jussi Uusipaavalniemi	Jari Laukkanen	Jori Aro	Marko Poikolainen	Juhani Heinonen	FMCC 1989 (gold)
1989–90	Jussi Uusipaavalniemi	Jari Laukkanen	Jori Aro	Marko Poikolainen	Juhani Heinonen	ECC 1989 (11th); FMCC 1990 (gold); WCC 1990 (8th)
1990–91	Jussi Uusipaavalniemi	Jari Laukkanen	Jori Aro	Marko Poikolainen	Juhani Heinonen	ECC 1990 (7th); WCC 1991 (10th)
1991–92	Tomi Rantamäki	Jussi Heinonsalo	Heikki Virtanen	Marko Poikolainen		FMCC 1992 (gold)
1994–95	Jori Aro	Marko Poikolainen	Juhani Heinonen	Riku Raunio		FMCC 1995 (gold)
1995–96	Jori Aro	Marko Poikolainen	Juhani Heinonen	Riku Raunio	Wille Mäkelä	ECC 1995 (12th)
2003–04	Jussi Uusipaavalniemi	Miska Arminen	Marko Poikolainen	Petri Tsutsunen	Heikki Virtanen, Jukka Savonen	FMCC 2004 (5th)
