= Raimo Lind =

Finnish male curler

- Curler ♂

Team
- Curling club: Vierumäki CR

Curling career
- Member Association: Finland
- World Championship: 1 (1999)
- European Championship: 3 (1996, 1998, 1999)
Medal record
Curling
European Championships
Bronze medal – third place	1999 Chamonix
Finnish Men's Championship
Gold medal – first place	1996
Gold medal – first place	1998

Raimo Lind is a Finnish curler.

At the international level, he is a 1999 European bronze medallist.

At the national level, he is a two-time Finnish men's champion curler (1996, 1998).

== Teams ==
Season	Skip	Third	Second	Lead	Alternate	Coach	Events
1995–96	Markku Uusipaavalniemi	Jussi Uusipaavalniemi	Raimo Lind	Hannu Nieminen	Jouni Weckman		FMCC 1996 (gold)
1996–97	Markku Uusipaavalniemi	Jussi Uusipaavalniemi	Raimo Lind	Wille Mäkelä			ECC 1996 (7th)
1997–98	Markku Uusipaavalniemi	Wille Mäkelä	Tommi Häti	Jari Laukkanen	Raimo Lind		FMCC 1998 (gold)
1998–99	Markku Uusipaavalniemi	Wille Mäkelä	Tommi Häti	Jari Laukkanen	Raimo Lind	Olli Rissanen (ECC); Eeva Röthlisberger (ECC)	ECC 1998 (6th); WCC 1999 (8th)
1999–00	Markku Uusipaavalniemi	Wille Mäkelä	Tommi Häti	Jari Laukkanen	Raimo Lind	Olli Rissanen; Eeva Röthlisberger	ECC 1999 (bronze)
