= Tommi Häti =

Finnish male curler

- Curler ♂
- Born: 11 April 1971 (age 55); Helsinki

Team
- Curling club: Hyvinkää CC

Curling career
- Member Association: Finland
- World Championship: 5 (1997, 1998, 1999, 2000, 2001)
- European Championship: 6 (1997, 1998, 1999, 2000, 2001, 2011)
- Olympic: 1 (2002)
Medal record
Curling
World Championships
Bronze medal – third place	1998 Kamloops
Bronze medal – third place	2000 Glasgow
European Championships
Gold medal – first place	2000 Oberstdorf
Bronze medal – third place	1999 Chamonix
Bronze medal – third place	2001 Vierumäki
Finnish Men's Championship
Gold medal – first place	1999
Gold medal – first place	2000
Gold medal – first place	2001
Gold medal – first place	2002
Gold medal – first place	2011
Bronze medal – third place	2012

Tommi Juhani Häti (born 11 April 1971 in Helsinki) is a Finnish male curler.

He is a European curling champion (2000) and a World men's bronze medallist. He competed at the 2002 Winter Olympics where the Finnish men's curling team placed fifth.

He started curling in 1987 at the age of 17.

== Teams ==
Season	Skip	Third	Second	Lead	Alternate	Coach	Events
1996–97	Markku Uusipaavalniemi	Wille Mäkelä	Jussi Uusipaavalniemi	Tommi Häti	Jouni Weckman		WCC 1997 (10th)
1997–98	Markku Uusipaavalniemi	Wille Mäkelä	Jussi Uusipaavalniemi	Tommi Häti	Jari Laukkanen		ECC 1997 (6th)
1997–98	Markku Uusipaavalniemi	Wille Mäkelä	Tommi Häti	Jari Laukkanen	Jussi Uusipaavalniemi		WCC 1998 (bronze)
1998–99	Markku Uusipaavalniemi	Wille Mäkelä	Tommi Häti	Jari Laukkanen	Raimo Lind (ECC, WCC)	Olli Rissanen (ECC); Eeva Röthlisberger (ECC)	ECC 1998 (6th); FMCC 1999 (gold); WCC 1999 (8th)
1999–00	Markku Uusipaavalniemi	Wille Mäkelä	Tommi Häti	Jari Laukkanen	Raimo Lind (ECC); Perttu Piilo (WCC)	Olli Rissanen (ECC); Eeva Röthlisberger (ECC, WCC)	ECC 1999 (bronze); FMCC 2000 (gold); WCC 2000 (bronze)
2000–01	Markku Uusipaavalniemi	Wille Mäkelä	Tommi Häti	Jari Laukkanen	Pekka Saarelainen		ECC 2000 (gold); FMCC 2001 (gold); WCC 2001 (5th)
2001–02	Markku Uusipaavalniemi	Wille Mäkelä	Tommi Häti	Jari Laukkanen	Pekka Saarelainen	Ken Armstrong (ECC)	ECC 2001 (bronze); FMCC 2002 (gold); OG 2002 (5th)
2004–05	Wille Mäkelä	Jari Laukkanen	Pekka Saarelainen	Tommi Häti	Riku Raunio		FMCC 2005 (5th)
2010–11	Markku Uusipaavalniemi	Joni Ikonen	Kasper Hakunti	Toni Anttila	Tommi Häti		FMCC 2011 (gold)
2011–12	Markku Uusipaavalniemi	Toni Anttila	Kasper Hakunti	Joni Ikonen	Tommi Häti		ECC 2011 (17th)
2011–12	Markku Uusipaavalniemi	Joni Ikonen	Toni Anttila	Kasper Hakunti	Tommi Häti	Markku Uusipaavalniemi	FMCC 2012 (bronze)
2012–13	Markku Uusipaavalniemi	Jari Laukkanen	Tommi Häti	Jesse Uusipaavalniemi	Joni Ikonen		FMCC 2013 (4th)
