= 1989 European Curling Championships =

- Host city: Engelberg, Switzerland
- Arena: Sportzentrum Erlen
- Dates: December 5–9
- Men's winner: Scotland
- Skip: Hammy McMillan
- Third: Norman Brown
- Second: Hugh Aitken
- Lead: Jim Cannon
- Finalist: Norway (Eigil Ramsfjell)
- Women's winner: West Germany
- Curling club: SC Riessersee, Garmisch-Partenkirchen
- Skip: Andrea Schöpp
- Third: Monika Wagner
- Second: Christina Haller
- Lead: Heike Wieländer
- Finalist: Switzerland (Marianne Flotron)

The 1989 European Curling Championships were held from December 5 to 9 at the Sportzentrum Erlen arena in Engelberg, Switzerland.

The Scottish men's team won their fifth title and the West German women's team won their fourth title.

The event was televised on Eurosport.

== Men ==
=== Teams ===
The men's teams were as follows.

Country	Skip	Third	Second	Lead	Alternate	Curling club, city
Austria	Alois Kreidl	Thomas Wieser	Dieter Küchenmeister	Stefan Salinger		Kitzbühel CC, Kitzbühel
Belgium	Marcel Marién	Pierre Mallants	Walter Verbueken	Blair Roberts		
Denmark	Frants Gufler	Christian Thune	Niels Siggaard	Finn Nielsen		
England	Eric Laidler	Jim. Wilson	D. Michael Sutherland	Neil Harvey		
Finland	Jussi Uusipaavalniemi	Jari Laukkanen	Jori Aro	Marko Poikolainen	Juhani Heinonen	Hyvinkää CC, Hyvinkää
France	Dominique Dupont-Roc	Daniel Cosetto	Lionel Tournier	Patrick Philippe		
Italy	Andrea Pavani	Fabio Alverà	Franco Sovilla	Stefano Morona		
Netherlands	Otto Veening	Rob Joosen	Hans van Dijk	Fred Melker		
Norway	Eigil Ramsfjell	Dagfinn Loen	Espen de Lange	Thoralf Hognestad	Bent Ånund Ramsfjell	Snarøyen CC, Oslo
Scotland	Hammy McMillan	Norman Brown	Hugh Aitken	Jim Cannon		
Sweden	Per Lindeman	Bo Andersson	Göran Åberg	Carl von Wendt		Karlstads CK, Karlstad
Switzerland	Markus Känzig	Silvano Flückiger	Mario Flückiger	Michel Evard		
Wales	Adrian Meikle	Jamie Meikle	Hugh Meikle	Nick Leslie		
West Germany	Keith Wendorf	Sven Saile	Christoph Möckel	Uwe Saile		CC Schwenningen, Schwenningen

=== First Phase (Triple Knockout) ===
The results were as follows:

==== Round 1 ====
Two teams promoted to Second Phase

Game 1		Game 2		Game 3
		Scotland	8
Italy	7	Italy	3
Austria	4			Scotland	6
Sweden	10			Sweden	5
Wales	2	Sweden	7
France	1	Finland	4
Finland	7

Game 1		Game 2		Game 3
		Norway	3
West Germany	14	West Germany	7
England	4			West Germany	5
Switzerland	8			Switzerland	6
Belgium	5	Switzerland	6
Denmark	9	Denmark	4
Netherlands	5

==== Round 2 ====
Three teams promoted to Second Phase

Game 1		Game 2		Game 3
				Sweden	8
				England	1
		England	9
Belgium	5	Netherlands	2
Netherlands	8

Game 1		Game 2		Game 3
				West Germany	8
				France	4
		Austria	2
Wales	4	France	7
France	6

Game 1		Game 2
Italy	4
Finland	3	Italy	1
Norway	8	Norway	6
Denmark	4

==== Round 3 ====
Three teams promoted to Second Phase

Game 1		Game 2
		England	5
Denmark	4	Wales	8
Wales	6

Game 1		Game 2
		Italy	2
Austria	8	Austria	7
Netherlands	4

Game 1		Game 2
		France	8
Finland	10	Finland	2
Belgium	0

=== Second Phase (Double Knockout) ===
==== Round 1 ====
Two teams promoted to Playoffs

Game 1
Scotland	8
Austria	3
Sweden	4
West Germany	3

Game 2
Scotland	7
Sweden	3

Game 1
Switzerland	9
Wales	1
Norway	4
France	2

Game 2
Switzerland	3
Norway	8

==== Round 2 ====
Two teams promoted to Playoffs

Game 1		Game 2
		Switzerland	2
Austria	1	West Germany	7
West Germany	6

Game 1		Game 2
		Sweden	3
Wales	4	France	5
France	8

=== Placement Phase ===
==== Range 9-14 ====
Quarterfinals (9-14)
England	6
Belgium	2
Denmark	5
Netherlands	4

Semifinals (9-14)
England	1
Italy	5
Finland	3
Denmark	6

Final for 9th place
Italy	6
Denmark	2

Semifinals (11-14)
England	9
Netherlands	3
Finland	7
Belgium	1

Final for 11th place
England	1
Finland	11
Match for 13th place
Netherlands	2
Belgium	9

==== Range 5-8 ====
Final for 5th place
Switzerland	7
Sweden	8

Final for 7th place
Austria	10
Wales	3

=== Playoffs ===
Semifinals
Scotland	5
West Germany	4
Norway	7
France	3

Final
Scotland	5
Norway	4
Bronze Medal Game
West Germany	6
France	5

=== Final standings ===
The final rankings were as follows.

Place	Country	Skip	Games	Wins	Losses
1st place, gold medalist(s)	Scotland	Hammy McMillan	6	6	0
2nd place, silver medalist(s)	Norway	Eigil Ramsfjell	7	5	2
3rd place, bronze medalist(s)	West Germany	Keith Wendorf	9	6	3
4	France	Dominique Dupont-Roc	10	5	5
5	Sweden	Per Lindeman	8	5	3
6	Switzerland	Markus Känzig	7	4	3
7	Austria	Alois Kreidl	7	3	4
8	Wales	Adrian Meikle	7	2	5
9	Italy	Andrea Pavani	7	4	3
10	Denmark	Frants Gufler	7	3	4
11	Finland	Jussi Uusipaavalniemi	8	4	4
12	England	Eric Laidler	7	2	5
13	Belgium	Marcel Marién	6	1	5
14	Netherlands	Otto Veening	6	0	6

== Women ==
=== Teams ===
The women's teams were as follows.

Country	Skip	Third	Second	Lead	Curling club, city
Austria	Lilly Hummelt	Eva Nägele	Monika Hölzl	Margit Dalik	
Denmark	Helena Blach	Malene Krause	Hanne Raun	Gitte Larsen	Hvidovre CC, Hvidovre
England	Caroline Cumming	Aileen Gemmell	Alison Arthur	Penni Davis	
Finland	Jaana Jokela	Terhi Aro	Mari Lundén	Heidi Koskiheimo	
France	Paulette Sulpice	Brigitte Lamy	Jocelyn Lhenry	Guylaine Fratucello	
Italy	Ann Lacedelli	Francesca Del Fabbro	Daniela Zandegiacomo	Loredana Siorpaes	
Netherlands	Jenny Bovenschen	Netty Born	Kniertje van Kuyk	Teuna Jongert	
Norway	Trine Trulsen	Dordi Nordby	Hanne Pettersen	Mette Halvorsen	Snarøyen CC, Oslo
Scotland	Kirsty Addison	Karen Addison	Joanna Pegg	Laura Scott	
Sweden	Anette Norberg	Anna Rindeskog	Sofie Marmont	Louise Marmont	Härnösands CK, Härnösand
Switzerland	Marianne Flotron	Daniela Sartori	Esther Christen	Caroline Rück	
Wales	Helen Lyon	Jean Robinson	Hilary Davis	Jackie Jones	
West Germany	Andrea Schöpp	Monika Wagner	Christina Haller	Heike Wieländer	SC Riessersee, Garmisch-Partenkirchen

=== First Phase (Triple Knockout) ===
The results were as follows:

==== Round 1 ====
Two teams promoted to Second Phase

Game 1		Game 2		Game 3
		Sweden	9
England	3	France	2
France	11			Sweden	6
Denmark	11			Denmark	5
Wales	4	Denmark	8
Norway	10	Norway	3
Finland	5

Game 1
Netherlands	4
Austria	8
West Germany	10
Italy	2

Game 2
Scotland	10
Austria	2
Switzerland	4
West Germany	6

Game 3
Scotland	5
West Germany	8

==== Round 2 ====
Three teams promoted to Second Phase

Game 1		Game 2		Game 3
				Scotland	8
				Finland	6
		England	7
Wales	1	Finland	8
Finland	11

Game 1		Game 2
		Denmark	3
Netherlands	4	Italy	7
Italy	12

Game 1
France	3
Norway	10
Austria	3
Switzerland	11

Game 2
Norway	4
Switzerland	6

==== Round 3 ====
Three teams promoted to Second Phase

Game 1		Game 2
		Denmark	11
Austria	6	Wales	3
Wales	7

Game 1		Game 2
		Norway	14
England	9	England	1
Netherlands	3

Game 1
Finland	6
France	9

=== Second Phase (Double Knockout) ===
==== Round 1 ====
Two teams promoted to Playoffs

Game 1
Sweden	7
Norway	5
Italy	1
Scotland	8

Game 2
Sweden	7
Scotland	5

Game 1
West Germany	15
Denmark	4
Switzerland	9
France	6

Game 2
West Germany	5
Switzerland	4

==== Round 2 ====
Two teams promoted to Playoffs

Game 1		Game 2
		Switzerland	9
Norway	7	Norway	7
Italy	3

Game 1		Game 2
		Scotland	4
Denmark	9	Denmark	5
France	7

=== Placement Phase ===
==== Range 9-13 ====
Quarterfinals (9-13)
Austria	9
Netherlands	8

Semifinals (9-13)
Wales	9
England	8
Finland	9
Austria	3

Final for 9th place
Wales	2
Finland	9

Semifinals (11-13)		Final for 11th place
England	5
Netherlands	11	Netherlands	12
		Austria	2

==== Range 5-8 ====
Final for 5th place
Norway	10
Scotland	3

Final for 7th place
Italy	4
France	7

=== Playoffs ===
Semifinals
Sweden	5
Switzerland	8
West Germany	6
Denmark	3

Final
Switzerland	2
West Germany	4
Bronze Medal Game
Sweden	8
Denmark	5

=== Final standings ===
The final rankings were as follows.

Place	Country	Skip	Games	Wins	Losses
1st place, gold medalist(s)	West Germany	Andrea Schöpp	7	7	0
2nd place, silver medalist(s)	Switzerland	Marianne Flotron	8	5	3
3rd place, bronze medalist(s)	Sweden	Anette Norberg	6	5	1
4	Denmark	Helena Blach	10	5	5
5	Norway	Trine Trulsen	9	5	4
6	Scotland	Kirsty Addison	7	3	4
7	France	Paulette Sulpice	7	3	4
8	Italy	Ann Lacedelli	6	2	4
9	Finland	Jaana Jokela	7	4	3
10	Wales	Helen Lyon	6	2	4
11	Netherlands	Jenny Bovenschen	6	2	4
12	Austria	Lilly Hummelt	7	2	5
13	England	Caroline Cumming	6	1	5
