= Frédéric Jean =

Swiss male curler and coach

- Curler ♂

Team
- Curling club: Biel-Touring CC, Biel

Curling career
- Member Association: Switzerland
- World Championship: 2 (1991, 1992)
Medal record
Curling
World Championships
Gold medal – first place	1992 Garmisch-Partenkirchen
Swiss Men's Championship
Gold medal – first place	1991 Engelberg
Gold medal – first place	1992 Flims
Gold medal – first place	1994 Biel/Bienne

Frédéric Jean is a Swiss curler and curling coach.

He is a 1992 World Men's champion and a three-time Swiss men's champion (1991, 1992, 1994).

== Teams ==
Season	Skip	Third	Second	Lead	Events
1990–91	Markus Eggler	Frédéric Jean	Stefan Hofer	Björn Schröder	SMCC 1991 (gold); WCC 1991 (5th)
1991–92	Markus Eggler	Frédéric Jean	Stefan Hofer	Björn Schröder	SMCC 1992 (gold); WCC 1992 (gold)
1993–94	Markus Eggler	Frédéric Jean	Stefan Hofer	Björn Schröder	SMCC 1994 (gold)

== Record as a coach of national teams ==
Year	Tournament, event	National team	Place
1995	1995 European Curling Championships	Switzerland (men)	2nd place, silver medalist(s)
1996	1996 European Curling Championships	Switzerland (men)	3rd place, bronze medalist(s)
1997	1997 European Curling Championships	Switzerland (men)	5
1998	1998 World Men's Curling Championship	Switzerland (men)	8
1998	1998 European Curling Championships	Switzerland (men)	5
