= Daniel Moratelli =

French curler (born 1961)

- Curler ♂
- Born: 17 September 1961 (age 65); Juvisy-sur-Orge

Team
- Curling club: Club de sports Megève, Megève

Curling career
- Member Association: France
- World Championship: 2 (1991, 1993)
- European Championship: 2 (1991, 1992)
- Olympic: 1 (1992 - demo)
Medal record
Curling

Daniel Moratelli (born 17 September 1961 in Juvisy-sur-Orge) is a French curler.

He participated in the demonstration curling events at the 1992 Winter Olympics, where the French men's team finished in sixth place.

== Teams ==
Season	Skip	Third	Second	Lead	Alternate	Coach	Events
1990–91	Dominique Dupont-Roc	Claude Feige	Thierry Mercier	Patrick Philippe	Daniel Moratelli		WCC 1991 (9th)
1991–92	Dominique Dupont-Roc	Claude Feige	Patrick Philippe	Daniel Moratelli	Thierry Mercier		ECC 1991 (5th)
1991–92	Dominique Dupont-Roc	Claude Feige	Patrick Philippe	Thierry Mercier	Daniel Moratelli		WOG 1992 (demo) (6th)
1992–93	Claude Feige	Jan Henri Ducroz	Daniel Moratelli	Joel Indergand	Laurent Flenghi	Thierry Mercier	ECC 1992 (5th)
1992–93	Claude Feige	Jan Henri Ducroz	Daniel Moratelli	Laurent Flenghi	Joel Indergand	Thierry Mercier	WCC 1993 (10th)
