= Tony Eng =

Swedish male curler

- Curler ♂
- Born: 19 June 1959 (age 67)

Team
- Curling club: Karlstads CK, Karlstad

Curling career
- Member Association: Sweden
- World Championship: 1 (1982)
- Other appearances: World Junior Championships: 1 (1979)
Medal record
Curling
Swedish Men's Championship
Gold medal – first place	1982

Sven Tony Eng (born 19 June 1959) is a Swedish curler.

He is a 1982 Swedish men's champion.

== Teams ==
Season	Skip	Third	Second	Lead	Events
1978–79	Tony Eng	Sören Grahn	Lars Grengmark	Anders Svennerstedt	SJCC 1979 (gold); WJCC 1979 (7th)
1981–82	Connie Östlund	Tony Eng	Henrik Holmberg	Anders Svennerstedt	SMCC 1982 (gold)
1981–82	Sören Grahn	Connie Östlund	Niclas Järund	Tony Eng	WCC 1982 (4th)
