= 1979 World Junior Curling Championships =

- Host city: Moose Jaw, Saskatchewan, Canada
- Dates: March 11–17
- Men's winner: United States (1st title)
- Skip: Donald Barcome Jr.
- Third: Randy Darling
- Second: Bobby Stalker
- Lead: Earl Barcome
- Finalist: Scotland (Andrew McQuistin)

The 1979 World Junior Curling Championships were held from March 11 to 17 at the Moose Jaw Civic Centre in Moose Jaw, Saskatchewan, Canada. The tournament only consisted of a men's event.

== Teams ==
| Country | Skip | Third | Second | Lead | Curling club |
|---|---|---|---|---|---|
| Canada | Darren Fish | Lorne Barker | Murray Ursulak | Randy Ursuliak | |
| Denmark | Tommy Stjerne | Oluf Olsen | Steen Hansen | Peter Andersen | Hvidovre CC |
| France | Claude Feige | Gilles Marin-Pache | Gerard Ravello | Christophe Boan | |
| West Germany | Roland Jentsch | Hans-Joachim Burba | Wolfgang Burba | Werner Kolb | |
| Italy | Massimo Alvera | Franco Sovilla | Stefano Morona | Dennis Ghezze | Cortina CC, Cortina d'Ampezzo |
| Norway | Sjur Loen | Morten Skaug | Olav Saugstad | Tom Sørlundsengen | Brumunddal CC, Oslo |
| Scotland | Andrew McQuistin | Neale McQuistin | Hugh Aitken | Dick Adams | |
| Sweden | Tony Eng | Sören Grahn | Lars Grengmark | Anders Svennerstedt | Karlstads CK, Karlstad |
| Switzerland | Eric Rudolph | Manuel Guiger | Pasqual Bianchi | Tony Weil | |
| United States | Donald Barcome Jr. | Randy Darling | Bobby Stalker | Earl Barcome | Grand Forks CC, North Dakota |

== Round robin ==
| Place | Team | 1 | 2 | 3 | 4 | 5 | 6 | 7 | 8 | 9 | 10 | Wins | Losses |
|---|---|---|---|---|---|---|---|---|---|---|---|---|---|
| 1 | Canada | * | 4:8 | 6:5 | 6:4 | 6:5 | 5:4 | 9:7 | 6:4 | 10:5 | 11:2 | 8 | 1 |
| 2 | United States | 8:4 | * | 7:3 | 5:6 | 6:5 | 9:3 | 6:7 | 6:3 | 7:5 | 10:2 | 7 | 2 |
| 3 | Norway | 5:6 | 3:7 | * | 8:7 | 6:4 | 4:6 | 5:2 | 9:6 | 7:5 | 8:4 | 6 | 3 |
| 4 | Scotland | 4:6 | 6:5 | 7:8 | * | 5:3 | 7:3 | 2:7 | 13:2 | 6:5 | 7:6 | 6 | 3 |
| 5 | Switzerland | 5:6 | 5:6 | 4:6 | 3:5 | * | 6:5 | 8:7 | 6:4 | 4:2 | 6:5 | 5 | 4 |
| 6 | Denmark | 4:5 | 3:9 | 6:4 | 3:7 | 5:6 | * | 4:2 | 6:4 | 11:5 | 9:4 | 5 | 4 |
| 7 | Sweden | 7:9 | 7:6 | 2:5 | 7:2 | 7:8 | 2:4 | * | 7:4 | 7:6 | 6:4 | 5 | 4 |
| 8 | Italy | 4:6 | 3:6 | 6:9 | 2:13 | 4:6 | 4:6 | 4:7 | * | 9:6 | 7:5 | 2 | 7 |
| 9 | France | 5:10 | 5:7 | 5:7 | 5:6 | 2:4 | 5:11 | 6:7 | 6:9 | * | 11:5 | 1 | 8 |
| 10 | Germany | 2:11 | 2:10 | 4:8 | 6:7 | 5:6 | 4:9 | 4:6 | 5:7 | 5:11 | * | 0 | 9 |

Teams to playoffs

== Playoffs ==
Semifinal
1 | Canada | 3
4 | Scotland | 5
2 | United States | 7
3 | Norway | 4

Gold Medal Game
1 | Scotland | 4
3 | United States | 5
Bronze medal game
1 | Canada | 8
3 | Norway | 4

== Final standings ==
| Place | Team | Games played | Wins | Losses |
|---|---|---|---|---|
| 1st place, gold medalist(s) | United States | 11 | 9 | 2 |
| 2nd place, silver medalist(s) | Scotland | 11 | 7 | 4 |
| 3rd place, bronze medalist(s) | Canada | 11 | 9 | 2 |
| 4 | Norway | 11 | 6 | 5 |
| 5 | Switzerland | 9 | 5 | 4 |
| 6 | Denmark | 9 | 5 | 4 |
| 7 | Sweden | 9 | 5 | 4 |
| 8 | Italy | 9 | 2 | 7 |
| 9 | France | 9 | 1 | 8 |
| 10 | Germany | 9 | 0 | 9 |

== Awards ==
- WJCC Sportsmanship Award: (Scotland) Andrew McQuistin

All-Star Team:

- Skip: (Norway) Sjur Loen
- Third: (Canada) Lorne Barker
- Second: (Scotland) Hugh Aitken
- Lead: (Canada) Randy Ursuliak
