= Patrick Philippe =

French curler and coach (born 1962)

- Curler ♂
- Born: 15 January 1962 (age 64); Saint-Julien-en-Genevois

Team
- Curling club: Club de sports Megève, Megève

Curling career
- Member Association: France
- World Championship: 3 (1986, 1989, 1991)
- European Championship: 4 (1988, 1989, 1991, 1994)
- Olympic: 1 (1992 – demo)
- Other appearances: World Junior Championships: 2 (1982, 1983)
Medal record
Curling

Patrick Philippe (born 15 January 1962 in Saint-Julien-en-Genevois) is a French curler and curling coach.

He participated in the demonstration curling events at the 1992 Winter Olympics, where the French men's team finished in sixth place.

== Teams ==
Season	Skip	Third	Second	Lead	Alternate	Coach	Events
1981–82	Christophe Boan	Philippe Pomi	Christophe Michaud	Patrick Philippe			WJCC 1982 (7th)
1982–83	Dominique Dupont-Roc	Patrick Philippe	Christian Dupont-Roc	Thierry Mercier			WJCC 1983 (9th)
1985–86	Dominique Dupont-Roc	Christian Dupont-Roc	Thierry Mercier	Patrick Philippe			WCC 1986 (7th)
1988–89	Dominique Dupont-Roc	Christian Dupont-Roc	Daniel Cosetto	Patrick Philippe	Thierry Mercier (WCC)		ECC 1988 (5th); WCC 1989 (9th)
1989–90	Dominique Dupont-Roc	Daniel Cosetto	Lionel Tournier	Patrick Philippe			ECC 1989 (4th)
1990–91	Dominique Dupont-Roc	Claude Feige	Thierry Mercier	Patrick Philippe	Daniel Moratelli		WCC 1991 (9th)
1991–92	Dominique Dupont-Roc	Claude Feige	Patrick Philippe	Daniel Moratelli	Thierry Mercier		ECC 1991 (5th)
1991–92	Dominique Dupont-Roc	Claude Feige	Patrick Philippe	Thierry Mercier	Daniel Moratelli		WOG 1992 (demo) (6th)
1994–95	Thierry Mercier (fourth)	Christophe Boan (skip)	Patrick Philippe	Gerard Ravello	Lionel Tournier	Michel Jeannot	ECC 1994 (13th)

== Record as a coach of national teams ==
Year	Tournament, event	National team	Place
1995	1995 European Curling Championships	France (men)	8
1995	1995 European Curling Championships	France (women)	13
1996	1996 European Curling Championships	France (women)	8
2008	2008 European Junior Curling Challenge	France (junior women)	3rd place, bronze medalist(s)
