= Jari Laukkanen (curler) =

Finnish male curler and curling coach

- Curler ♂
- Born: 12 June 1965 (age 61); Kesälahti, North Karelia, Finland

Team
- Curling club: Hyvinkää CC

Curling career
- Member Association: Finland
- World Championship: 7 (1988, 1990, 1991, 1998, 1999, 2000, 2001)
- European Championship: 10 (1987, 1988, 1989, 1990, 1993, 1997, 1998, 1999, 2000, 2001)
- Olympic: 1 (2002)
- Other appearances: World Senior Curling Championships: 1 (2018)
Medal record
Curling
World Championships
Bronze medal – third place	1998 Kamloops
Bronze medal – third place	2000 Glasgow
European Championships
Gold medal – first place	2000 Oberstdorf
Bronze medal – third place	1999 Chamonix
Bronze medal – third place	2001 Vierumäki
Finnish Men's Championship
Gold medal – first place	1987
Gold medal – first place	1988
Gold medal – first place	1989
Gold medal – first place	1990
Gold medal – first place	1993
Gold medal – first place	1997
Gold medal – first place	1998
Gold medal – first place	1999
Gold medal – first place	2000
Gold medal – first place	2001
Gold medal – first place	2002
Bronze medal – third place	2016

Jari Petteri Laukkanen (born 12 June 1965 in Kesälahti, North Karelia, Finland) is a Finnish male curler and curling coach.

He is a European curling champion (2000) and a World men's bronze medallist. He competed at the 2002 Winter Olympics where the Finnish men's curling team placed fifth.

He started curling in 1979 at the age of 14.

== Teams ==
Season	Skip	Third	Second	Lead	Alternate	Coach	Events
1986–87	Jussi Uusipaavalniemi	Jari Laukkanen	Petri Tsutsunen	Jarmo Jokivalli	Juhani Heinonen		FMCC 1987 (gold)
1987–88	Jussi Uusipaavalniemi	Jarmo Jokivalli	Jari Laukkanen	Petri Tsutsunen	Juhani Heinonen		ECC 1987 (7th)
1987–88	Jussi Uusipaavalniemi	Petri Tsutsunen	Jari Laukkanen	Jarmo Jokivalli	Juhani Heinonen		FMCC 1988 (gold); WCC 1988 (9th)
1988–89	Jussi Uusipaavalniemi	Jarmo Jokivalli	Jari Laukkanen	Petri Tsutsunen	Juhani Heinonen		ECC 1988 (12th)
1988–89	Jussi Uusipaavalniemi	Jari Laukkanen	Jori Aro	Marko Poikolainen	Juhani Heinonen		FMCC 1989 (gold)
1989–90	Jussi Uusipaavalniemi	Jari Laukkanen	Jori Aro	Marko Poikolainen	Juhani Heinonen		ECC 1989 (11th); FMCC 1990 (gold); WCC 1990 (8th)
1990–91	Jussi Uusipaavalniemi	Jari Laukkanen	Jori Aro	Marko Poikolainen	Juhani Heinonen		ECC 1990 (7th); WCC 1991 (10th)
1992–93	Jari Laukkanen	Pekka Saarelainen	Marko Latvala	Tommi Valvelainen			FMCC 1993 (gold)
1993–94	Jari Laukkanen	Petri Tsutsunen	Pekka Saarelainen	Marko Latvala	Tommi Valvelainen		ECC 1993 (7th)
1996–97	Markku Uusipaavalniemi	Wille Mäkelä	Tommi Häti	Jari Laukkanen	Jussi Uusipaavalniemi		FMCC 1997 (gold)
1997–98	Markku Uusipaavalniemi	Wille Mäkelä	Jussi Uusipaavalniemi	Tommi Häti	Jari Laukkanen		ECC 1997 (6th)
1997–98	Markku Uusipaavalniemi	Wille Mäkelä	Tommi Häti	Jari Laukkanen	Raimo Lind (FMCC); Jussi Uusipaavalniemi (WMCC)		FMCC 1998 (gold); WCC 1998 (bronze)
1998–99	Markku Uusipaavalniemi	Wille Mäkelä	Tommi Häti	Jari Laukkanen	Raimo Lind (ECC, WCC)	Olli Rissanen (ECC); Eeva Röthlisberger (ECC)	ECC 1998 (6th); FMCC 1999 (gold); WCC 1999 (8th)
1999–00	Markku Uusipaavalniemi	Wille Mäkelä	Tommi Häti	Jari Laukkanen	Raimo Lind (ECC), Perttu Piilo (WCC)	Olli Rissanen (ECC); Eeva Röthlisberger (ECC, WCC)	ECC 1999 (bronze); FMCC 2000 (gold); WCC 2000 (bronze)
2000–01	Markku Uusipaavalniemi	Wille Mäkelä	Tommi Häti	Jari Laukkanen	Pekka Saarelainen		ECC 2000 (gold); FMCC 2001 (gold); WCC 2001 (5th)
2001–02	Markku Uusipaavalniemi	Wille Mäkelä	Tommi Häti	Jari Laukkanen	Pekka Saarelainen	Ken Armstrong (ECC)	ECC 2001 (bronze); FMCC 2002 (gold); OG 2002 (5th)
2004–05	Wille Mäkelä	Jari Laukkanen	Pekka Saarelainen	Tommi Häti	Riku Raunio		FMCC 2005 (5th)
2007–08	Markku Uusipaavalniemi	Wille Mäkelä	Tommi Häti	Jari Laukkanen			
2012–13	Markku Uusipaavalniemi	Jari Laukkanen	Tommi Häti	Jesse Uusipaavalniemi	Joni Ikonen		FMCC 2013 (4th)
2014–15	Markku Uusipaavalniemi	Joni Ikonen	Jari Laukkanen	Jason Moore	Jari Turto		FMCC 2015 (6th)
2015–16	Markku Uusipaavalniemi	Joni Ikonen	Kimmo Ilvonen	Toni Anttila	Jari Laukkanen		FMCC 2016 (bronze)
2015–16	Jussi Uusipaavalniemi	Jari Laukkanen	Olavi Malmi	Juhani Heinonen			FSMCC 2016 (bronze)
2016–17	Jussi Uusipaavalniemi	Juhani Heinonen	Markku Hämälainen	Jari Laukkanen	Petri Tsutsunen		FSMCC 2017 (6th)
2017–18	Jussi Uusipaavalniemi	Jari Laukkanen	Markku Hämälainen	Juhani Heinonen			FSMCC 2018 (gold); WSCC 2018 (9th)

== Record as a coach of national teams ==
Year	Tournament, event	National team	Place
2005	2005 European Curling Championships	Finland (men)	8
2006	2002 Winter Olympics	Finland (men)	2nd place, silver medalist(s)
