= Alain Brangi =

French male curler

- Curler ♂

Team
- Curling club: Club de sports Megève, Megève

Curling career
- Member Association: France
- World Championship: 1 (1988)
- European Championship: 1 (1987)
Medal record
Curling

Alain Brangi is a French curler.

== Teams ==
Season	Skip	Third	Second	Lead	Events
1987–88	Christophe Boan	Gerard Ravello	Alain Brangi	Thierry Mercier	ECC 1987 (12th)
1987–88	Christophe Boan	Thierry Mercier	Gerard Ravello	Alain Brangi	WCC 1988 (7th)
