= Laurent Flenghi =

French male curler

- Curler ♂

Team
- Curling club: Club de sports Megève, Megève

Curling career
- Member Association: France
- World Championship: 1 (1993)
- European Championship: 1 (1990)
Medal record
Curling

Laurent Flenghi is a French curler.

== Teams ==
Season	Skip	Third	Second	Lead	Alternate	Coach	Events
1990–91	Thierry Mercier	Daniel Cosetto	Lionel Tournier	Laurent Flenghi	Joel Indergand		ECC 1990 (6th)
1992–93	Claude Feige	Jan Henri Ducroz	Daniel Moratelli	Laurent Flenghi	Joel Indergand	Thierry Mercier	WCC 1993 (10th)
