= Dominique Dupont-Roc =

French curler (born 1963)

- Curler ♂
- Born: 26 September 1963 (age 63); Sallanches, Haute-Savoie, France

Team
- Curling club: Club de sports Megève, Megève, Chamonix CC, Chamonix

Curling career
- Member Association: France
- World Championship: 4 (1986, 1989, 1991, 2001)
- European Championship: 5 (1985, 1988, 1989, 1991, 2000, 2002)
- Olympic: 2 (1992 - demo, 2002)
- Other appearances: World Junior Championships: 3 (1981, 1983, 1984)
Medal record
Curling
French Men's Championship
Gold medal – first place	1985
Gold medal – first place	1988
Gold medal – first place	1989
Gold medal – first place	1990
Gold medal – first place	1995
Gold medal – first place	1996
Gold medal – first place	1997
Gold medal – first place	2000

Dominique Dupont-Roc (born 26 September 1963 in Sallanches, Haute-Savoie, France) is a French curler, and an eight-time French men's champion.

He participated in the 2002 Winter Olympics where the French men's team finished in tenth place. He also participated in the demonstration curling events at the 1992 Winter Olympics, where the French men's team finished in sixth place.

== Teams ==
Season	Skip	Third	Second	Lead	Alternate	Coach	Events
1980–81	Christophe Boan	Dominique Dupont-Roc	Philippe Pomi	Christophe Michaud			WJCC 1981 (9th)
1982–83	Dominique Dupont-Roc	Patrick Philippe	Christian Dupont-Roc	Thierry Mercier			WJCC 1983 (9th)
1983–84	Dominique Dupont-Roc	Philippe Pomi	Christian Dupont-Roc	Thierry Mercier			WJCC 1984 (8th)
1985–86	Dominique Dupont-Roc	Christian Dupont-Roc	Thierry Mercier	Daniel Cosetto (ECC); Patrick Philippe (WCC)			ECC 1985 (11th); WCC 1986 (7th)
1988–89	Dominique Dupont-Roc	Christian Dupont-Roc	Daniel Cosetto	Patrick Philippe	Thierry Mercier (WCC)		ECC 1988 (5th); WCC 1989 (9th)
1989–90	Dominique Dupont-Roc	Daniel Cosetto	Lionel Tournier	Patrick Philippe			ECC 1989 (4th)
1990–91	Dominique Dupont-Roc	Claude Feige	Thierry Mercier	Patrick Philippe	Daniel Moratelli		WCC 1991 (9th)
1991–92	Dominique Dupont-Roc	Claude Feige	Patrick Philippe	Daniel Moratelli	Thierry Mercier		ECC 1991 (5th)
1991–92	Dominique Dupont-Roc	Claude Feige	Patrick Philippe	Thierry Mercier	Daniel Moratelli		WOG 1992 (demo) (6th)
2000–01	Dominique Dupont-Roc	Jan Henri Ducroz	Thomas Dufour	Spencer Mugnier	Philippe Caux	Bruno-Denis Dubois	ECC 2000 (7th); WCC 2001 (6th)
2001–02	Dominique Dupont-Roc	Jan Ducroz	Thomas Dufour	Spencer Mugnier	Philippe Caux		WOG 2002 (7th)
2002–03	Dominique Dupont-Roc	Jan Henri Ducroz	Spencer Mugnier	Philippe Caux	Julien Charlet		ECC 2002 (9th)
