= Claude Feige =

French curler (born 1958)

- Curler ♂
- Born: 24 June 1958 (age 68); Megève

Team
- Curling club: Mont d'Arbois CC, Megève, Club de sports Megève, Megève

Curling career
- Member Association: France
- World Championship: 3 (1987, 1991, 1993)
- European Championship: 4 (1980, 1986, 1991, 1992)
- Olympic: 1 (1992 - demo)
- Other appearances: World Junior Championships: 4 (1975, 1976, 1977, 1979)
Medal record
Curling
French Men's Championship
Gold medal – first place	1992
Gold medal – first place	1994

Claude Feige (born 24 June 1958) is a French curler.

He participated in the demonstration curling events at the 1992 Winter Olympics, where the French men's team finished in sixth place.

At the national level, he is a two-time French men's champion curler.

== Teams ==
Season	Skip	Third	Second	Lead	Alternate	Coach	Events
1974–75	Claude Feige	Jean-Louis Sibuet	Christian Marin-Pache	Marc Sibuet			WJCC 1975 (8th)
1975–76	Claude Feige	Jean-Louis Sibuet	Christian Marin-Pache	Marc Sibuet			WJCC 1976 (5th)
1976–77	Claude Feige	Marc Sibuet	Gilles Marin-Pache	Yves Tronc			WJCC 1977 (6th)
1978–79	Claude Feige	Gilles Marin-Pache	Gerard Ravello	Christophe Boan			WJCC 1979 (9th)
1980–81	Claude Feige	Marc Sibuet	Gilles Marin-Pache	Claude Marin-Pache			ECC 1980 (4th)
1986–87	Jean-Francois Orset	Claude Feige	Jean-Louis Sibuet	Marc Sibuet			ECC 1986 (8th); WCC 1987 (9th)
1990–91	Dominique Dupont-Roc	Claude Feige	Thierry Mercier	Patrick Philippe	Daniel Moratelli		WCC 1991 (9th)
1991–92	Dominique Dupont-Roc	Claude Feige	Patrick Philippe	Daniel Moratelli	Thierry Mercier		ECC 1991 (5th)
1991–92	Dominique Dupont-Roc	Claude Feige	Patrick Philippe	Thierry Mercier	Daniel Moratelli		WOG 1992 (demo) (6th)
1992–93	Claude Feige	Jan Henri Ducroz	Daniel Moratelli	Joel Indergand	Laurent Flenghi	Thierry Mercier	ECC 1992 (5th)
1992–93	Claude Feige	Jan Henri Ducroz	Daniel Moratelli	Laurent Flenghi	Joel Indergand	Thierry Mercier	WCC 1993 (10th)
