= Christophe Boan =

French curler

- Curler ♂

Team
- Curling club: Club de sports Megève, Megève

Curling career
- Member Association: France
- World Championship: 2 (1988, 1992)
- European Championship: 2 (1987, 1994)
- Other appearances: World Junior Championships: 5 (1978, 1979, 1980, 1981, 1982)
Medal record
Curling
French Men's Championship
Gold medal – first place	1987
Gold medal – first place	1991
Gold medal – first place	1993

Christophe Boan is a French curler.

At the national level, he is a three-time French men's champion curler and a two-time French junior men's champion curler.

== Teams ==
Season	Skip	Third	Second	Lead	Alternate	Coach	Events
1977–78	Yves Tronc	Pascal Pagliano	Christophe Boan	André Jouvent			WJCC 1978 (9th)
1978–79	Claude Feige	Gilles Marin-Pache	Gerard Ravello	Christophe Boan			WJCC 1979 (9th)
1979–80	Yves Tronc	Christophe Boan	Gerard Ravello	André Jouvent			WJCC 1980 (8th)
1980–81	Christophe Boan	Dominique Dupont-Roc	Philippe Pomi	Christophe Michaud			WJCC 1981 (9th)
1981–82	Christophe Boan	Philippe Pomi	Christophe Michaud	Patrick Philippe			WJCC 1982 (7th)
1987–88	Christophe Boan	Gerard Ravello	Alain Brangi	Thierry Mercier			ECC 1987 (12th)
1987–88	Christophe Boan	Thierry Mercier	Gerard Ravello	Alain Brangi			WMCC 1988 (7th)
1991–92	Thierry Mercier (fourth)	Christophe Boan (skip)	Spencer Mugnier	Gerard Ravello			WMCC 1992 (10th)
1994–95	Thierry Mercier (fourth)	Christophe Boan (skip)	Patrick Philippe	Gerard Ravello	Lionel Tournier	Michel Jeannot	ECC 1994 (13th)
