= French Men's Curling Championship =

France has had a national men's curling championship since 1951.

Year	Skip	Locale
1951	E. Canepa	Megève
1952	E. Canepa	Megève
1953	E. Canepa	Megève
1954	E. Canepa	Megève
1955	E. Canepa	Megève
1956	H. Lafit	Chamonix
1957	Maurice Sulpice	Megève
1958	Maurice Sulpice	Megève
1959	O. Polinger	Megève
1960	Jean Albert Sulpice	Megève
1961	Jean Albert Sulpice	Megève
1962	M. Maisonny	Megève
1963	H. Lafit	Chamonix
1964	Jean Albert Sulpice	Megève
1965	Pierre Boan	Mt. d'Arbois (Megève)
1966	Pierre Boan	Mt. d'Arbois (Megève)
1967	Jean Albert Sulpice	Megève
1968	Pierre Boan	Mt. d'Arbois (Megève)
1969	Pierre Boan	Mt. d'Arbois (Megève)
1970	Jean Albert Sulpice	Megève
1971	Pierre Boan	Mt. d'Arbois (Megève)
1972	Pierre Boan	Mt. d'Arbois (Megève)
1973	Pierre Boan	Mt. d'Arbois (Megève)
1974	Pierre Duclos	Megève
1975	André Tronc	Mt. d'Arbois (Megève)
1976	André Tronc	Mt. d'Arbois (Megève)
1977	Pierre Boan	Mt. d'Arbois (Megève)
1978	Pierre Boan	Mt. d'Arbois (Megève)
1979	Pierre Saas	Strasbourg
1980	Henri Müller	Bischeim (Strasbourg)
1981	Gérard Alazet	Megève
1982	Gérard Natter	Belfort
1983	Henri Müller	Strasbourg
1984	Maurice Mercier	Megève
1985	Dominique Dupont-Roc	Megève
1986	Jean-Francois Orset	Megève
1987	Christophe Boan	Megève
1988	Dominique Dupont-Roc	Megève
1989	Dominique Dupont-Roc	Megève
1990	Dominique Dupont-Roc	Megève
1991	Christophe Boan	Megève
1992	Claude Feige	Paris-Meudon
1993	Christophe Boan	Megève
1994	Claude Feige	Boulogne
1995	Dominique Dupont-Roc	Megève
1996	Dominique Dupont-Roc	Megève
1997	Dominique Dupont-Roc	Megève
1998	NOT HELD	
1999	Thierry Mercier	Megève
2000	Dominique Dupont-Roc	Chamonix
2001	Thierry Mercier	Megève
2002	Thomas Dufour	Chamonix
2003	Thomas Dufour	Chamonix
2004	Thierry Mercier	Megève
2005	Thomas Dufour	Chamonix
2006	Thomas Dufour	Chamonix
2007	Thierry Mercier	Megève
2008	Thomas Dufour	Chamonix
2009	Thomas Dufour	Chamonix
2010	Thomas Dufour	Chamonix
2011	Thomas Dufour	Chamonix
2012	Thomas Dufour	Chamonix
2013	Guillaume Vincent	Saint Gervais-les-Bains
2014	Thomas Dufour	Chamonix
2015	Wilfrid Coulot	Besançon
2016	Julien Thomas	Valence

== Sources ==
- Championnat de France messieurs
- Nos Champions (web archive)
