= Stefan Hofer =

Swiss curler

- Curler ♂

Team
- Curling club: Biel-Touring CC, Biel

Curling career
- Member Association: Switzerland
- World Championship: 3 (1991, 1992, 1994)
- European Championship: 1 (1993)
Medal record
Curling
World Championships
Gold medal – first place	1992 Garmisch-Partenkirchen
Bronze medal – third place	1994 Oberstdorf
European Championships
Bronze medal – third place	1993 Leukerbad
Swiss Men's Championship
Gold medal – first place	1991 Engelberg
Gold medal – first place	1992 Flims
Gold medal – first place	1994 Biel/Bienne

Stefan Hofer is a Swiss curler.

He is a 1992 World Men's champion, 1994 World Men's bronze medallist and a three-time Swiss men's champion (1991, 1992, 1994).

== Teams ==
Season	Skip	Third	Second	Lead	Alternate	Events
1990–91	Markus Eggler	Frédéric Jean	Stefan Hofer	Björn Schröder		SMCC 1991 (gold); WCC 1991 (5th)
1991–92	Markus Eggler	Frédéric Jean	Stefan Hofer	Björn Schröder		SMCC 1992 (gold); WCC 1992 (gold)
1993–94	Markus Eggler	Dominic Andres	Björn Schröder	Stefan Hofer	Andreas Schwaller	ECC 1993 (bronze)
1993–94	Markus Eggler	Frédéric Jean (SMCC); Dominic Andres (WCC)	Stefan Hofer	Björn Schröder	Martin Zürrer (WCC)	SMCC 1994 (gold); WCC 1994 (bronze)
1994–95	Markus Eggler	Dominic Andres	Stefan Hofer	Björn Schröder		
