= 1988 Hexagon World Men's Curling Championship =

- Host city: Lausanne, Switzerland
- Arena: Icehalle
- Dates: April 11–17, 1988
- Winner: Norway
- Curling club: Snarøen CC, Oslo
- Skip: Eigil Ramsfjell
- Third: Sjur Loen
- Second: Morten Søgaard
- Lead: Bo Bakke
- Finalist: Canada (Pat Ryan)

The 1988 World Men's Curling Championship took place at the Icehalle in Lausanne, Switzerland from April 11–17. The gold medal was won by Team Norway, who also won the Curling competition in the 1988 Olympics in Calgary, Canada. Canada took the silver medal, and Scotland the bronze.

== Teams ==
Canada	Denmark	Finland	France	Germany
Ottewell CC, Edmonton, Alberta Skip: Pat Ryan; Third: Randy Ferbey; Second: Don Walchuk; Lead: Don McKenzie	Hvidovre CC, Hvidovre Skip: Gert Larsen; Third: Oluf Olsen; Second: Jan Hansen; Lead: Michael Harry	Hyvinkää CC, Hyvinkää Skip: Jussi Uusipaavalniemi; Third: Petri Tsutsunen; Second: Jari Laukkanen; Lead: Jarmo Jokivalli; Alternate: Juhani Heinonen	Megève CC Skip: Christophe Boan; Third: Thierry Mercier; Second: Gerard Ravello; Lead: Alain Brangi	SC Riessersee, Garmisch-Partenkirchen Skip: Rainer Schöpp; Third: Dieter Kolb; Second: Norbert Petrasch; Lead: Reinhard Ernst
Norway	Scotland	Sweden	Switzerland	United States
Snarøen CC, Oslo Skip: Eigil Ramsfjell; Third: Sjur Loen; Second: Morten Søgaard; Lead: Bo Bakke	St. Martins CC, Perth Skip: David Smith; Third: Mike Hay; Second: Peter Smith; Lead: David Hay	Karlstads CK, Karlstad Skip: Sören Grahn; Third: Henrik Holmberg; Second: Per Axelsson; Lead: Håkan Funk	Kloten CC Skip: Daniel Model; Third: Beat Stephan; Second: Michael Lips; Lead: Richard Mähr; Alternate: Daniel Müller	Granite CC, Seattle Skip: Doug Jones; Third: Bard Nordlund; Second: Murphy Tomlinson; Lead: Mike Grennan

== Round-robin standings ==
Country	Skip	W	L
Canada	Pat Ryan	9	0
Scotland	David Smith	7	2
Norway	Eigil Ramsfjell	7	2
Switzerland	Daniel Model	5	4
Sweden	Sören Grahn	4	5
Germany	Rainer Schöpp	3	6
France	Christophe Boan	3	6
Denmark	Gert Larsen	3	6
Finland	Jussi Uusipaavalniemi	2	7
United States	Doug Jones	2	7

== Round-robin results ==
=== Draw 1 ===
Team	Final
Finland (Uusipaavalniemi)	4
Germany (Schöpp)	6

Team	Final
United States (Jones)	2
Scotland (Smith)	5

Team	Final
Sweden (Grahn)	2
Switzerland (Müller)	5

Team	Final
Denmark (Larsen)	4
Norway (Ramsfjell)	6

Team	Final
Canada (Ryan)	8
France (Boan)	4

=== Draw 2 ===
Team	Final
Scotland (Smith)	7
France (Boan)	4

Team	Final
Canada (Ryan)	8
Sweden (Grahn)	3

Team	Final
Norway (Ramsfjell)	8
Germany (Schöpp)	4

Team	Final
Finland (Uusipaavalniemi)	3
Switzerland (Müller)	4

Team	Final
Denmark (Larsen)	8
United States (Jones)	5

=== Draw 3 ===
Team	Final
Canada (Ryan)	8
Denmark (Larsen)	4

Team	Final
Norway (Ramsfjell)	6
Finland (Uusipaavalniemi)	3

Team	Final
France (Boan)	7
United States (Jones)	2

Team	Final
Germany (Schöpp)	2
Sweden (Grahn)	8

Team	Final
Scotland (Smith)	7
Switzerland (Müller)	2

=== Draw 4 ===
Team	Final
United States (Jones)	4
Finland (Uusipaavalniemi)	8

Team	Final
Germany (Schöpp)	2
Switzerland (Müller)	6

Team	Final
Canada (Ryan)	6
Scotland (Smith)	2

Team	Final
France (Boan)	9
Denmark (Larsen)	3

Team	Final
Sweden (Grahn)	5
Norway (Ramsfjell)	6

=== Draw 5 ===
Team	Final
France (Boan)	1
Switzerland (Müller)	7

Team	Final
Sweden (Grahn)	3
United States (Jones)	6

Team	Final
Denmark (Larsen)	8
Finland (Uusipaavalniemi)	2

Team	Final
Norway (Ramsfjell)	4
Scotland (Smith)	6

Team	Final
Germany (Schöpp)	4
Canada (Ryan)	7

=== Draw 6 ===
Team	Final
Norway (Ramsfjell)	1
Canada (Ryan)	8

Team	Final
Denmark (Larsen)	4
Germany (Schöpp)	6

Team	Final
Scotland (Smith)	5
Sweden (Grahn)	6

Team	Final
Switzerland (Müller)	6
United States (Jones)	3

Team	Final
France (Boan)	1
Finland (Uusipaavalniemi)	2

=== Draw 7 ===
Team	Final
Germany (Schöpp)	4
Scotland (Smith)	8

Team	Final
Finland (Uusipaavalniemi)	2
Canada (Ryan)	8

Team	Final
United States (Jones)	3
Norway (Ramsfjell)	9

Team	Final
Sweden (Grahn)	5
France (Boan)	6

Team	Final
Switzerland (Müller)	4
Denmark (Larsen)	6

=== Draw 8 ===
Team	Final
Denmark (Larsen)	4
Sweden (Grahn)	7

Team	Final
France (Boan)	5
Norway (Ramsfjell)	6

Team	Final
Switzerland (Müller)	3
Canada (Ryan)	4

Team	Final
Scotland (Smith)	7
Finland (Uusipaavalniemi)	1

Team	Final
United States (Jones)	5
Germany (Schöpp)	3

=== Draw 9 ===
Team	Final
Switzerland (Müller)	3
Norway (Ramsfjell)	8

Team	Final
Scotland (Smith)	6
Denmark (Larsen)	5

Team	Final
Germany (Schöpp)	8
France (Boan)	3

Team	Final
United States (Jones)	5
Canada (Ryan)	6

Team	Final
Finland (Uusipaavalniemi)	2
Sweden (Grahn)	4

== Tiebreakers ==
Team	Final
France (Boan)	3
Germany (Schöpp)	7

Team	Final
France (Boan)	8
Denmark (Larsen)	6

== Playoffs ==
Semifinals
1	Canada	4
4	Switzerland	2
2	Scotland	2
3	Norway	7

Final
1	Canada	4
3	Norway	5
Bronze medal
4	Switzerland	3
2	Scotland	4

=== Semifinals ===
Team	Final
Scotland (Smith)	2
Norway (Ramsfjell)	7

Team	Final
Canada (Ryan)	4
Switzerland (Müller)	2

=== Bronze medal match ===
Team	Final
Scotland (Smith)	4
Switzerland (Müller)	3

=== Gold medal match ===
Team	Final
Canada (Ryan)	4
Norway (Ramsfjell)	5

1988 Hexagon World Men's Curling Championship
(Norway)
Norway
3rd title
