= 1992 World Men's Curling Championship =

- Host city: Garmisch-Partenkirchen, Germany
- Arena: Olympic Eisstadion
- Dates: March 28 – April 5, 1992
- Winner: Switzerland
- Curling club: Biel-Touring CC, Biel
- Skip: Markus Eggler
- Third: Frédéric Jean
- Second: Stefan Hofer
- Lead: Björn Schröder
- Finalist: Scotland (Hammy McMillan)

The 1992 World Men's Curling Championship (branded as 1992 Canada Safeway World Men's Curling Championship for sponsorship reasons) took place from March 28 – April 5, 1992, at the Olympic Eisstadion in Garmisch-Partenkirchen, Germany.

== Teams ==
Australia	Canada	England	Finland	France
Melbourne CC Skip: Hugh Millikin; Third: Tom Kidd; Second: Daniel Joyce; Lead: Stephen Hewitt	Granite CC, Winnipeg, Manitoba Skip: Vic Peters; Third: Dan Carey; Second: Chris Neufeld; Lead: Don Rudd	Wigan CC, Wigan; Haigh CC, Wigan Skip: Alistair Burns; Third: Neil Hardie; Second: Martyn Deakin; Lead: Stephen Watt; Alternate: Ian Coutts	Hyvinkää CC Skip: Jussi Uusipaavalniemi; Third: Jori Aro; Second: Markku Uusipaavalniemi; Lead: Mikko Orrainen; Alternate: Juhani Heinonen	Megève CC Skip: Christophe Boan; Third: Thierry Mercier; Second: Spencer Mugnier; Lead: Gerard Ravello
Germany	Scotland	Sweden	Switzerland	United States
Munchener EV, Munich Skip: Rodger Gustaf Schmidt; Third: Wolfgang Burba; Second: Hans-Joachim Burba; Lead: Bernhard Mayr; Alternate: Martin Beiser	Castle Kennedy CC, Stranraer Skip: Hammy McMillan; Third: Norman Brown; Second: Gordon Muirhead; Lead: Roger McIntyre	Sollefteå CK Skip: Mikael Hasselborg; Third: Hans Nordin; Second: Lars Vågberg; Lead: Stefan Hasselborg; Alternate: Lars-Åke Nordström	Biel-Touring CC, Biel Skip: Markus Eggler; Third: Frédéric Jean; Second: Stefan Hofer; Lead: Björn Schröder	Granite CC, Seattle, Washington Skip: Doug Jones; Third: Jason Larway; Second: Joel Larway; Lead: Tom Violette

== Round-robin standings ==
Key
Teams to playoffs
Teams to tiebreaker

Country	Skip	W	L
Canada	Vic Peters	7	2
United States	Doug Jones	6	3
Switzerland	Markus Eggler	6	3
Finland	Jussi Uusipaavalniemi	5	4
Scotland	Hammy McMillan	5	4
Australia	Hugh Millikin	4	5
Sweden	Mikael Hasselborg	4	5
England	Alistair Burns	4	5
Germany	Rodger Gustaf Schmidt	2	7
France	Christophe Boan	2	7

== Round-robin results ==
=== Draw 1 ===
Sheet A	Final
England (Burns)	4
Australia (Millikin)	9

Sheet B	Final
Canada (Peters)	7
Switzerland (Eggler)	5

Sheet C	Final
Germany (Schmidt)	2
Scotland (McMillan)	5

Sheet D	Final
United States (Jones)	6
Finland (Uusipaavalniemi)	11

Sheet E	Final
Sweden (Hasselborg)	7
France (Boan)	6

=== Draw 2 ===
Sheet A	Final
Sweden (Hasselborg)	4
Switzerland (Eggler)	7

Sheet B	Final
Germany (Schmidt)	8
France (Boan)	7

Sheet C	Final
England (Burns)	6
Finland (Uusipaavalniemi)	5

Sheet D	Final
Australia (Millikin)	5
Scotland (McMillan)	8

Sheet E	Final
Canada (Peters)	3
United States (Jones)	2

=== Draw 3 ===
Sheet A	Final
Canada (Peters)	6
Germany (Schmidt)	5

Sheet B	Final
Finland (Uusipaavalniemi)	6
Australia (Millikin)	8

Sheet C	Final
Sweden (Hasselborg)	7
United States (Jones)	9

Sheet D	Final
England (Burns)	10
France (Boan)	5

Sheet E	Final
Switzerland (Eggler)	5
Scotland (McMillan)	4

=== Draw 4 ===
Sheet A	Final
France (Boan)	4
Finland (Uusipaavalniemi)	7

Sheet B	Final
United States (Jones)	6
England (Burns)	8

Sheet C	Final
Australia (Millikin)	9
Sweden (Hasselborg)	6

Sheet D	Final
Switzerland (Eggler)	7
Germany (Schmidt)	6

Sheet E	Final
Scotland (McMillan)	7
Canada (Peters)	5

=== Draw 5 ===
Sheet A	Final
Germany (Schmidt)	11
England (Burns)	6

Sheet B	Final
Scotland (McMillan)	6
Sweden (Hasselborg)	4

Sheet C	Final
France (Boan)	7
Switzerland (Eggler)	4

Sheet D	Final
United States (Jones)	9
Australia (Millikin)	4

Sheet E	Final
Finland (Uusipaavalniemi)	5
Canada (Peters)	8

=== Draw 6 ===
Sheet A	Final
Scotland (McMillan)	2
United States (Jones)	4

Sheet B	Final
France (Boan)	4
Switzerland (Eggler)	5

Sheet C	Final
Finland (Uusipaavalniemi)	9
Sweden (Hasselborg)	3

Sheet D	Final
Germany (Schmidt)	2
Australia (Millikin)	11

Sheet E	Final
England (Burns)	5
Switzerland (Eggler)	7

=== Draw 7 ===
Sheet A	Final
Australia (Millikin)	2
Canada (Peters)	8

Sheet B	Final
Scotland (McMillan)	9
France (Boan)	5

Sheet C	Final
United States (Jones)	8
Germany (Schmidt)	5

Sheet D	Final
Switzerland (Eggler)	6
Finland (Uusipaavalniemi)	4

Sheet E	Final
Sweden (Hasselborg)	8
England (Burns)	7

=== Draw 8 ===
Sheet A	Final
Finland (Uusipaavalniemi)	9
Scotland (McMillan)	7

Sheet B	Final
Sweden (Hasselborg)	6
Germany (Schmidt)	4

Sheet C	Final
Canada (Peters)	10
England (Burns)	6

Sheet D	Final
Switzerland (Eggler)	5
United States (Jones)	8

Sheet E	Final
France (Boan)	8
Australia (Millikin)	7

=== Draw 9 ===
Sheet A	Final
United States (Jones)	9
France (Boan)	8

Sheet B	Final
England (Burns)	5
Scotland (McMillan)	4

Sheet C	Final
Australia (Millikin)	4
Switzerland (Eggler)	7

Sheet D	Final
Canada (Peters)	4
Sweden (Hasselborg)	6

Sheet E	Final
Germany (Schmidt)	8
Finland (Uusipaavalniemi)	9

== Tiebreaker ==
Sheet A	Final
Finland (Uusipaavalniemi)	3
Scotland (McMillan)	5

== Playoffs ==
Scotland skip Hammy McMillan made an incredible "around the horn" takeout in the 8th end of the semifinal against Canada to score 3 points en route to defeating the Canadians.

=== Bracket ===
Semi-final
1	Canada	3
4	Scotland	4
2	United States	6
3	Switzerland	8

Final
4	Scotland	3
3	Switzerland	6

=== Final ===
Sheet A	1	2	3	4	5	6	7	8	9	10	Final
Switzerland (Eggler)	2	0	1	0	0	0	2	0	1	X	6
Scotland (McMillan)	0	1	0	1	0	0	0	1	0	X	3

1992 Safeway World Curling Championship
(Switzerland)
Switzerland
3rd title
