= Petri Tsutsunen =

Finnish male curler

- Curler ♂

Team
- Curling club: Hyvinkää CC, Hyvinkää

Curling career
- Member Association: Finland
- World Championship: 1 (1988)
- European Championship: 5 (1985, 1986, 1987, 1988, 1993)
- Other appearances: European Mixed Championship: 2 (2006, 2007)
Medal record
Curling
Finnish Men's Championship
Gold medal – first place	1985
Gold medal – first place	1986
Gold medal – first place	1987
Gold medal – first place	1988

Petri Tsutsunen is a Finnish male curler.

At the national level, he is a four-time Finnish men's champion curler (1985, 1986, 1987, 1988) and two-time Finnish mixed champion curler (2006, 2007).

== Teams ==
=== Men's ===
Season	Skip	Third	Second	Lead	Alternate	Events
1983–84	Markku Hämäläinen	Jussi Uusipaavalniemi	Petri Tsutsunen	Jarmo Jokivalli		FMCC 1984 (silver)
1984–85	Jussi Uusipaavalniemi	Petri Tsutsunen	Markku Uusipaavalniemi	Jarmo Jokivalli	Juhani Heinonen	FMCC 1985 (gold)
1985–86	Jussi Uusipaavalniemi	Petri Tsutsunen	Markku Uusipaavalniemi	Jarmo Jokivalli	Juhani Heinonen	ECC 1985 (9th); FMCC 1986 (gold)
1986–87	Jussi Uusipaavalniemi	Jarmo Jokivalli	Markku Uusipaavalniemi	Petri Tsutsunen	Juhani Heinonen	ECC 1986 (11th)
1986–87	Jussi Uusipaavalniemi	Jari Laukkanen	Petri Tsutsunen	Jarmo Jokivalli	Juhani Heinonen	FMCC 1987 (gold)
1987–88	Jussi Uusipaavalniemi	Jarmo Jokivalli	Jari Laukkanen	Petri Tsutsunen	Juhani Heinonen	ECC 1987 (7th)
1987–88	Jussi Uusipaavalniemi	Petri Tsutsunen	Jari Laukkanen	Jarmo Jokivalli	Juhani Heinonen	FMCC 1988 (gold); WCC 1988 (9th)
1988–89	Jussi Uusipaavalniemi	Jarmo Jokivalli	Jari Laukkanen	Petri Tsutsunen	Juhani Heinonen	ECC 1988 (12th)
2002–03	Jussi Uusipaavalniemi	Jukka Savonen	Miska Arminen	Heikki Virtanen	Petri Tsutsunen, Tommi Vahvelainen	FMCC 2003 (8th)
2006–07	Jussi Uusipaavalniemi	Jukka Savonen	Petri Tsutsunen	Miska Arminen	Perttu Piilo, Paavo Kuosmanen	FMCC 2007 (5th)
2007–08	Jussi Uusipaavalniemi	Paavo Kuosmanen	Perttu Piilo	Petri Tsutsunen	Jukka Savonen	FMCC 2008 (silver)
2008–09	Jussi Uusipaavalniemi	Perttu Piilo	Paavo Kuosmanen	Petri Tsutsunen	Jukka Savonen	FMCC 2009 (5th)
2013–14	Jussi Uusipaavalniemi	Jukka Savonen	Markus Kaustinen	Petri Tsutsunen	Petri Manninen, Jouni Weckman	FMCC 2014 (7th)
2016–17	Jussi Uusipaavalniemi	Juhani Heinonen	Markku Hämälainen	Jari Laukkanen	Petri Tsutsunen	FSMCC 2017 (6th)

=== Mixed ===
Season	Skip	Third	Second	Lead	Alternate	Events
2005	Jussi Uusipaavalniemi	Anne Malmi	Petri Tsutsunen	Johanna Pyyhtiä		FMxCC 2005 (bronze)
2006	Jussi Uusipaavalniemi	Anne Malmi	Petri Tsutsunen	Johanna Pyyhtiä	Olavi Malmi (EMxCC)	FMxCC 2006 (gold); EMxCC 2006 (6th)
2007	Jussi Uusipaavalniemi	Johanna Pyyhtiä	Petri Tsutsunen	Anne Malmi	Teemu Salo (FMxCC); Olavi Malmi (EMxCC)	FMxCC 2007 (gold); EMxCC 2007 (10th)
