= 1999 European Curling Championships =

- Host city: Chamonix, France
- Dates: December 4–11, 1999
- Men's winner: Scotland
- Curling club: Inverness CC, Inverness
- Skip: Hammy McMillan
- Third: Warwick Smith
- Second: Ewan MacDonald
- Lead: Peter Loudon
- Alternate: James Dryburgh
- Coach: Mike Hay
- Finalist: Denmark
- Women's winner: Norway
- Curling club: Snarøen CC, Oslo
- Skip: Dordi Nordby
- Third: Hanne Woods
- Second: Marianne Aspelin
- Lead: Cecilie Torhaug
- Coach: Torger Nergård
- Finalist: Sweden

The 1999 European Curling Championships were held in Chamonix, France December 4–11.

== Men's ==
=== A Tournament ===
==== Group A ====
Team	Skip	W	L
Finland	Markku Uusipaavalniemi	4	1
Switzerland	Patrick Hürlimann	4	1
Sweden	Peja Lindholm	4	1
France	Thierry Mercier	2	3
Netherlands	Wim Neeleman	1	4
Czech Republic	Karel Kubeska	0	5

===== Draw 1 =====
Team	1	2	3	4	5	6	7	8	9	10	Final
Sweden (Lindholm)	0	0	1	0	1	0	0	1	1	X	4
Finland (Uusipaavalniemi) 🔨	1	1	0	2	0	2	0	0	0	X	6

Team	1	2	3	4	5	6	7	8	9	10	Final
Czech Republic (Kubeska) 🔨	0	0	0	0	1	1	0	0	2	0	4
Switzerland (Hürlimann)	0	1	1	2	0	0	1	1	0	1	7

Team	1	2	3	4	5	6	7	8	9	10	Final
France (Mercier)	0	3	0	0	0	1	2	1	0	X	7
Netherlands (Neeleman) 🔨	1	0	0	0	1	0	0	0	1	X	3

===== Draw 2 =====
Team	1	2	3	4	5	6	7	8	9	10	Final
Finland (Uusipaavalniemi)	0	0	0	0	0	0	1	0	1	0	2
Switzerland (Hürlimann) 🔨	0	0	0	0	1	0	0	1	0	1	3

Team	1	2	3	4	5	6	7	8	9	10	Final
Czech Republic (Kubeska)	1	0	2	1	1	0	1	0	0	0	6
Netherlands (Neeleman) 🔨	0	0	0	0	0	3	0	2	3	4	12

Team	1	2	3	4	5	6	7	8	9	10	Final
France (Mercier) 🔨	1	0	0	1	0	0	1	0	1	X	4
Sweden (Lindholm)	0	0	2	0	2	1	0	2	0	X	7

===== Draw 3 =====
Team	1	2	3	4	5	6	7	8	9	10	Final
Czech Republic (Kubeska) 🔨	0	1	0	0	1	0	0	0	1	X	3
France (Mercier)	0	0	0	2	0	0	1	1	0	X	4

Team	1	2	3	4	5	6	7	8	9	10	Final
Finland (Uusipaavalniemi) 🔨	1	0	3	0	1	0	2	0	3	X	10
Netherlands (Neeleman)	0	3	0	1	0	1	0	1	0	X	6

Team	1	2	3	4	5	6	7	8	9	10	Final
Sweden (Lindholm) 🔨	0	1	0	0	3	0	2	0	0	0	6
Switzerland (Hürlimann)	0	0	0	1	0	1	0	1	1	1	5

===== Draw 4 =====
Team	1	2	3	4	5	6	7	8	9	10	Final
Netherlands (Neeleman)	0	0	0	0	1	0	X	X	X	X	1
Sweden (Lindholm) 🔨	4	0	2	3	0	1	X	X	X	X	10

Team	1	2	3	4	5	6	7	8	9	10	Final
Switzerland (Hürlimann)	0	1	0	3	0	2	0	4	0	X	10
France (Mercier) 🔨	0	0	2	0	2	0	1	0	2	X	7

Team	1	2	3	4	5	6	7	8	9	10	Final
Finland (Uusipaavalniemi)	1	0	5	1	1	1	0	X	X	X	9
Czech Republic (Kubeska) 🔨	0	1	0	0	0	0	1	X	X	X	2

===== Draw 5 =====
Team	1	2	3	4	5	6	7	8	9	10	Final
France (Mercier)	0	0	0	0	1	0	0	1	1	0	3
Finland (Uusipaavalniemi) 🔨	0	1	0	0	0	2	1	0	0	1	5

Team	1	2	3	4	5	6	7	8	9	10	Final
Sweden (Lindholm) 🔨	0	2	1	3	0	0	0	0	2	X	8
Czech Republic (Kubeska)	0	0	0	0	0	0	1	1	0	X	2

Team	1	2	3	4	5	6	7	8	9	10	Final
Netherlands (Neeleman)	0	1	1	0	3	0	X	X	X	X	5
Switzerland (Hürlimann) 🔨	5	0	0	4	0	4	X	X	X	X	13

==== Group B ====
Team	Skip	W	L
Scotland	Hammy McMillan	4	1
Denmark	Ulrik Schmidt	3	2
Norway	Pål Trulsen	3	2
Germany	Daniel Herberg	3	2
Russia	Alexey Tselousov	2	3
England	Mark Copperwheat	0	5

===== Draw 1 =====
Team	1	2	3	4	5	6	7	8	9	10	Final
Scotland (McMillan) 🔨	0	0	1	1	0	4	0	1	0	X	7
Norway (Trulsen)	0	0	0	0	2	0	1	0	1	X	4

Team	1	2	3	4	5	6	7	8	9	10	11	Final
Denmark (Schmidt) 🔨	1	0	3	0	0	1	0	1	0	0	1	7
Germany (Herberg)	0	1	0	1	1	0	1	0	1	1	0	6

Team	1	2	3	4	5	6	7	8	9	10	Final
Russia (Tselousov) 🔨	2	0	0	0	1	2	0	0	1	X	6
England (Copperwheat)	0	1	0	0	0	0	1	1	0	X	3

===== Draw 2 =====
Team	1	2	3	4	5	6	7	8	9	10	Final
Denmark (Schmidt)	1	0	3	0	0	3	1	2	X	X	10
England (Copperwheat) 🔨	0	1	0	1	0	0	0	0	X	X	2

Team	1	2	3	4	5	6	7	8	9	10	Final
Russia (Tselousov) 🔨	0	1	0	0	0	0	0	0	1	X	2
Scotland (McMillan)	1	0	0	2	0	0	2	0	0	X	5

Team	1	2	3	4	5	6	7	8	9	10	Final
Norway (Trulsen)	0	0	1	0	4	0	0	3	3	X	11
Germany (Herberg) 🔨	0	1	0	2	0	1	1	0	0	X	5

===== Draw 3 =====
Team	1	2	3	4	5	6	7	8	9	10	Final
Russia (Tselousov) 🔨	1	0	3	0	0	1	0	0	3	X	8
Denmark (Schmidt)	0	1	0	1	1	0	0	2	0	X	5

Team	1	2	3	4	5	6	7	8	9	10	Final
Norway (Trulsen) 🔨	1	0	1	0	2	0	3	0	2	X	9
England (Copperwheat)	0	1	0	2	0	1	0	1	0	X	5

Team	1	2	3	4	5	6	7	8	9	10	Final
Germany (Herberg)	2	0	3	0	0	1	4	X	X	X	10
Scotland (McMillan) 🔨	0	1	0	1	1	0	0	X	X	X	3

===== Draw 4 =====
Team	1	2	3	4	5	6	7	8	9	10	Final
Germany (Herberg)	0	1	1	1	0	1	3	0	3	X	10
Russia (Tselousov) 🔨	0	0	0	0	2	0	0	2	0	X	4

Team	1	2	3	4	5	6	7	8	9	10	Final
Norway (Trulsen)	0	3	0	1	0	1	0	3	0	X	8
Denmark (Schmidt) 🔨	2	0	2	0	3	0	1	0	2	X	10

Team	1	2	3	4	5	6	7	8	9	10	Final
England (Copperwheat)	0	1	0	0	1	1	0	1	0	X	4
Scotland (McMillan) 🔨	2	0	0	2	0	0	1	0	1	X	6

===== Draw 5 =====
Team	1	2	3	4	5	6	7	8	9	10	Final
England (Copperwheat)	0	3	0	0	0	0	0	X	X	X	3
Germany (Herberg) 🔨	2	0	2	2	1	1	2	X	X	X	10

Team	1	2	3	4	5	6	7	8	9	10	Final
Russia (Tselousov)	0	0	0	1	0	1	0	0	1	0	3
Norway (Trulsen) 🔨	0	3	0	0	0	0	0	2	0	0	5

Team	1	2	3	4	5	6	7	8	9	10	Final
Scotland (McMillan)	0	1	0	2	1	3	0	0	2	X	9
Denmark (Schmidt) 🔨	1	0	2	0	0	0	1	0	0	X	4

=== B Tournament ===
Team	Skip	W	L
Italy	Stefano Ferronato	3	0
Luxembourg	Hanjörg Bless	2	1
Austria	Alois Kreidl	1	2
Bulgaria	Lubomir Velinov	0	3

=== Challenge Games ===
Winning teams advance to Quarterfinals

Team	1	2	3	4	5	6	7	8	9	10	Final
France (Mercier)	0	3	0	0	4	0	1	0	1	X	9
Italy (Ferronato) 🔨	1	0	0	2	0	1	0	1	0	X	5

Team	1	2	3	4	5	6	7	8	9	10	Final
Germany (Herberg)	0	0	0	0	1	0	1	2	0	0	4
Luxembourg (Bless) 🔨	0	1	1	1	0	1	0	0	0	1	5

=== Playoffs ===
Quarterfinal
Norway	5
Switzerland	8
Scotland	8
France	7
Sweden	6
Denmark	9
Luxembourg	4
Finland	5

Semi-final
Scotland	9
Switzerland	2
Denmark	11
Finland	4

Final
Scotland	6
Denmark	5

Bronze medal
Switzerland	4
Finland	9

==== Quarterfinals ====
Team	1	2	3	4	5	6	7	8	9	10	Final
Norway (Trulsen)	0	1	0	0	2	0	1	0	1	0	5
Switzerland (Hürlimann) 🔨	1	0	0	2	0	1	0	3	0	1	8

Team	1	2	3	4	5	6	7	8	9	10	11	Final
France (Mercier) 🔨	0	0	2	0	1	0	0	3	0	1	0	7
Scotland (McMillan)	1	1	0	3	0	0	1	0	1	0	1	8

Team	1	2	3	4	5	6	7	8	9	10	Final
Denmark (Schmidt) 🔨	2	0	1	0	3	2	0	0	1	X	9
Sweden (Lindholm)	0	1	0	2	0	0	2	1	0	X	6

Team	1	2	3	4	5	6	7	8	9	10	Final
Finland (Uusipaavalniemi)	0	0	0	2	0	2	0	0	0	1	5
Luxembourg (Bless) 🔨	1	0	0	0	2	0	0	0	1	0	4

==== Semifinals ====
Team	1	2	3	4	5	6	7	8	9	10	Final
Denmark (Schmidt) 🔨	3	0	1	5	0	0	2	0	X	X	11
Finland (Uusipaavalniemi)	0	1	0	0	1	0	0	2	X	X	4

Team	1	2	3	4	5	6	7	8	9	10	Final
Switzerland (Hürlimann)	0	0	1	0	1	0	0	X	X	X	2
Scotland (McMillan) 🔨	3	0	0	0	0	2	4	X	X	X	9

==== Bronze-medal game ====
Team	1	2	3	4	5	6	7	8	9	10	Final
Switzerland (Hürlimann) 🔨	0	0	0	1	0	1	0	2	0	X	4
Finland (Uusipaavalniemi)	0	1	0	0	4	0	3	0	1	X	9

==== Gold-medal game ====
Team	1	2	3	4	5	6	7	8	9	10	Final
Denmark (Schmidt) 🔨	1	1	0	0	0	2	0	0	1	0	5
Scotland (McMillan)	0	0	0	0	2	0	1	2	0	1	6

=== Medals ===
Medal	Team
Gold	Scotland (Hammy McMillan, Warwick Smith, Ewan MacDonald, Peter Loudon, and James Dryburgh)
Silver	Denmark (Ulrik Schmidt, Lasse Lavrsen, Brian Hansen, Carsten Svensgaard, and Bo Jensen)
Bronze	Finland (Markku Uusipaavalniemi, Wille Mäkelä, Tommi Häti, Jari Laukkanen, and Raimo Lind)

== Women's ==
=== Group A ===
Team	Skip	W	L
Sweden	Margaretha Lindahl	5	1
Switzerland	Luzia Ebnöther	5	1
Germany	Andrea Schöpp	5	1
France	Audé Bénier	3	3
England	Sarah Johnston	2	4
Czech Republic	Paula Rubasova	1	5
Netherlands	Marie José Tiemstra	0	6

=== Group B ===
Team	Skip	W	L
Norway	Dordi Nordby	5	1
Scotland	Rhona Martin	5	1
Denmark	Lene Bidstrup	4	2
Russia	Nina Golovtchenko	3	3
Italy	Giulia Lacedelli	2	4
Finland	Jaana Jokela	2	4
Bulgaria	Zveta Bacheva	0	6

=== Playoffs ===
Quarterfinal
Sweden	8
Russia	6
Germany	2
Scotland	3
Switzerland	7
Denmark	3
France	6
Norway	11

Semi-final
Sweden	7
Scotland	5
Switzerland	5
Norway	7

Final
Sweden	4
Norway	5

Bronze medal
Scotland	5
Switzerland	9

=== Medals ===
Medal	Team
Gold	Norway (Dordi Nordby, Hanne Woods, Marianne Aspelin, and Cecilie Torhaug)
Silver	Sweden (Margaretha Lindahl, Ulrika Bergman, Anna Bergström, Maria Zackrisson, and Maria Engholm)
Bronze	Switzerland (Luzia Ebnöther, Nicole Strausak, Tanya Frei, Nadia Raspe, and Laurence Bidaud)
