= Mike Hay =

Scottish curler

Mike Hay is a Scottish curler and curling coach.

As a player, he had success from 1982 to 1996. He went on to coach the women's team that won gold in Curling at the 2002 Winter Olympics and, partly due to this, was appointed as an MBE in 2004. He later served as Britain's Olympic performance manager at the 2010 Winter Olympics. After this he became Chef de Mission for Team GB for the 2014 Winter Olympics, a role he also held at the 2018 Winter Olympics. He is brother to David Hay and son of curler Chuck Hay.

== Awards ==
- 1984 Colin Campbell Award
