= 1994 European Curling Championships =

- Host city: Sundsvall, Sweden
- Arena: Gärdehallen
- Dates: December 4–10
- Men's winner: Scotland
- Curling club: Castle Kennedy CC, Stranraer
- Skip: Hammy McMillan
- Third: Norman Brown
- Second: Mike Hay
- Lead: Roger McIntyre
- Alternate: Gordon Muirhead
- Coach: Hew Chalmers
- Finalist: Switzerland
- Women's winner: Denmark
- Curling club: Hvidovre CC, Hvidovre
- Skip: Helena Blach Lavrsen
- Third: Dorthe Holm
- Second: Margit Pörtner
- Lead: Helene Jensen
- Alternate: Lisa Richardson
- Coach: Jane Bidstrup
- Finalist: Germany

The 1994 European Curling Championships were held from December 4 to 10 at the Gärdehallen in Sundsvall, Sweden.

== Men's ==
=== A Tournament ===
==== Group A ====
Team	Skip	W	L
Scotland	Hammy McMillan	4	1
Norway	Eigil Ramsfjell	4	1
Sweden	Mikael Hasselborg	3	2
Germany	Andy Kapp	2	3
Finland	Tomi Rantamäki	1	4
Luxembourg	Hanjörg Bless	1	4

==== Group B ====
Team	Skip	W	L
Switzerland	Hansjörg Lips	4	1
Netherlands	Wim Neeleman	3	2
Wales	John Hunt	2	3
England	Alistair Burns	2	3
Denmark	Gert Larsen	2	3
France	Christophe Boan	2	3

=== B Tournament ===
==== Group A ====
Team	Skip	W	L
Austria	Alois Kreidl	5	1
Italy	Claudio Pescia	5	1
Czech Republic	Radek Klima	5	1
Belgium	Didier Plasschart	2	4
Bulgaria	Lubomir Velinov	2	4
Hungary	Barna Kereszi	2	4
Russia	Igor Minin	0	6

=== Playoffs ===
Quarterfinal
A1	Scotland	6
B4	England	4
B2	Netherlands	5
A3	Sweden	6
B1	Switzerland	7
A4	Germany	3
A2	Norway	11
B3	Wales	2

Semi-final
A1	Scotland	3
A3	Sweden	1
B1	Switzerland	6
A2	Norway	4

Final
A1	Scotland	4
B1	Switzerland	2

Bronze medal
A3	Sweden	9
A2	Norway	6

== Women's ==
=== Group A ===
Team	Skip	W	L
Sweden	Anette Norberg	5	0
Scotland	Kirsty Hay	4	1
France	Brigitte Lamy	3	2
Finland	Terhi Aro	2	3
England	Joan Reed	1	4
Netherlands	Mirjam Boymans-Gast	0	5

=== Group B ===
Team	Skip	W	L
Switzerland	Graziella Grichting	5	0
Norway	Dordi Nordby	4	1
Germany	Andrea Schöpp	3	2
Denmark	Helena Blach Lavrsen	2	3
Austria	Edeltraud Koudelka	1	4
Italy	Ann Lacedelli	0	5

=== B Tournament ===
==== Group A ====
Team	Skip	W	L
Czech Republic	Eva Petráková	3	1
Luxembourg	Stefanie Bless	3	1
Bulgaria	Marina Karagiozova	2	2
Russia	Tatiana Smirnova	1	3
Wales	Anne-Marie Christian	1	3

=== Playoffs ===
Quarterfinal
A1	Sweden	2
B4	Denmark	8
B2	Norway	8
A3	France	1
B3	Germany	8
A2	Scotland	2
B1	Switzerland	7
B-A1	Czech Republic	3

Semi-final
B4	Denmark	9
B2	Norway	2
B3	Germany	8
B1	Switzerland	4

Final
B4	Denmark	8
B3	Germany	4

Bronze medal
B2	Norway	6
B1	Switzerland	1
