= Markku Uusipaavalniemi =

Finnish curler and politician

- Curler
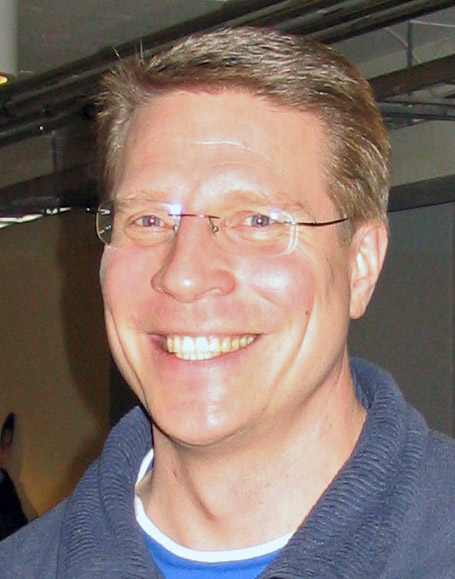
- Born: 23 November 1966 (age 59); Karkkila, Finland

Team
- Curling club: CC Dominant Eye, Helsinki
- Skip: Markku Uusipaavalniemi
- Third: Jari Laukkanen
- Second: Joni Ikonen
- Lead: Jari Turto

Curling career
- Member Association: Finland
- World Championship: 11 (1992, 1997, 1998, 1999, 2000, 2001, 2002, 2003, 2005, 2006, 2007)
- World Mixed Doubles Championship: 1 (2014)
- European Championship: 14 (1985, 1986, 1991, 1996, 1997, 1998, 1999, 2000, 2001, 2002, 2004, 2005, 2006, 2011)
- Olympic: 2 (2002, 2006)
Medal record
Men's curling
Winter Olympics
Silver medal – second place	2006 Turin	Team
World Championships
Bronze medal – third place	1998 Kamloops	Team
Bronze medal – third place	2000 Glasgow	Team
European Championships
Gold medal – first place	2000 Oberstdorf
Bronze medal – third place	1999 Chamonix
Bronze medal – third place	2001 Vierumaki
European Mixed Championship
Gold medal – first place	2005 Andorra
Finnish Men's Curling Championship
Gold medal – first place	1985
Gold medal – first place	1986
Gold medal – first place	1991
Gold medal – first place	1996
Gold medal – first place	1997
Gold medal – first place	1998
Gold medal – first place	1999
Gold medal – first place	2000
Gold medal – first place	2001
Gold medal – first place	2002
Gold medal – first place	2004
Gold medal – first place	2005
Gold medal – first place	2006
Gold medal – first place	2007
Gold medal – first place	2011
Silver medal – second place	2010
Silver medal – second place	2014
Bronze medal – third place	2003
Bronze medal – third place	2012
Bronze medal – third place	2016

Markku Uusipaavalniemi (born 23 November 1966) is a Finnish curler and former politician. He received a silver medal at the 2006 Winter Olympics in Turin.

== Curling career ==
Uusipaavalniemi was the skip of Team Finland for the first time in the mid-1990s. Most (but not all) of Finland's curling medals have been achieved with Uusipaavalniemi as skip. Uusipaavalniemi's team won the European Championships in 2000. He is also a two-time World Curling Championships bronze medalist (1998 and 2000) and two-time European Curling Championships bronze medalist (1999 and 2001).

Uusipaavalniemi's Finland team disappointingly finished fifth at the 2002 Olympic Games.

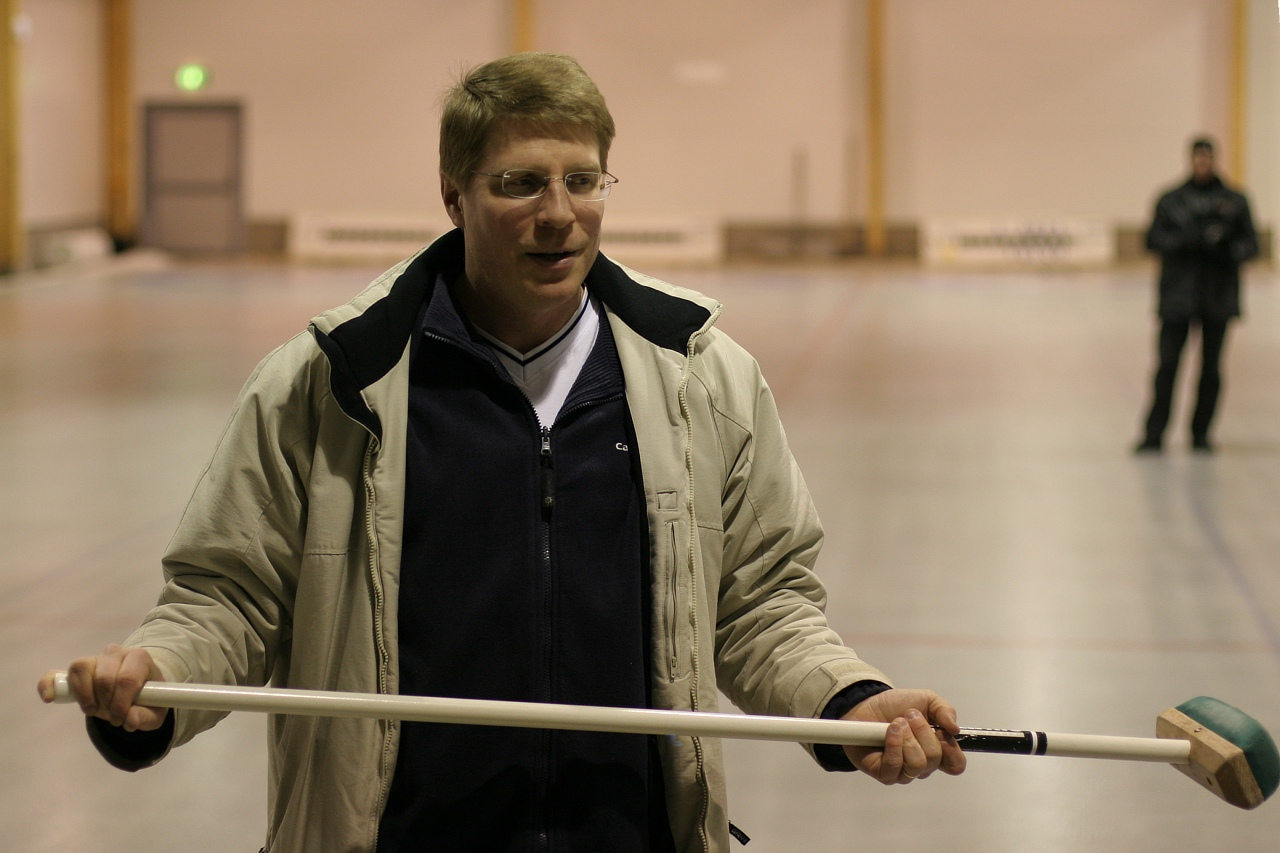
Markku Uusipaavalniemi at Oulunkylä Curling Hall

In 2004, he and his somewhat altered Finland line-up pulled off the daunting task of securing qualification for the 2005 Ford World Men's Curling Championships from the 'B' competition at the European championships, where they languished following the country's relegation the previous season. To do this, they had to win the competition outright, and then overcome Russia in an additional play-off match.

At the 2005 World Championship, Uusipaavalniemi's team finished the round-robin tied for first place with five other teams on an 8–3 record. In the tie-breakers however, they were knocked out of contention by Canada's Randy Ferbey. Also in 2005, Uusipaavalniemi won the first ever European Mixed Curling Championship with teammates Kirsi Nykänen, Teemu Salo and Tiina Kautonen in Andorra.

Uusipaavalniemi's Finland team finished the round-robin at the 2006 Olympic tournament in first place, with a 7–2 record. They beat Great Britain 4–3 in the semi-final, with the last stone of the final end — thrown by Uusipaavalniemi — giving the Finns the deciding point. Finland lost the final to Canada 10-4 taking the silver medal.

Two weeks before the start of the 2006 World Men's Curling Championship in Lowell, Massachusetts, Uusipaavalniemi suffered a wrist injury that forced him to miss the team's first three games of the competition. He recovered enough to start playing in the fourth game, where he skipped and threw second rocks. He played out the rest of the competition throwing third rocks, but Finland did not make the playoff round, finishing tied for fifth with a 6–5 record.

Uusipaavalniemi returned to the 2007 Ford World Men's Curling Championship but his team got off to a rough start, losing their first two games and stringing together back-to-back wins only twice. Finland qualified for a tiebreaker with a 6–5 record, but lost to Germany 8-5 and finished sixth. Markku admitted that his recent campaign for (and eventual election to) Finnish parliament had forced him to cut back on curling practice time, perhaps contributing to the team's early struggles.

After the 2007 World Championships Uusipaavalniemi didn't play at a competitive level until he returned to curling in the 2009–10 season with a new team. The new team won the Finnish Championship in the 2010–11 curling season and represented Finland in 2011 European Curling Championships. The appearance in the 2011 Europeans was a disappointment when Finland finished 7th in the B-group.

== Political career ==
On 20 September 2006 Uusipaavalniemi announced his candidacy for Finnish parliament in the 2007 election for the Centre Party.. Uusipaavalniemi was elected along with three other members of his party from the Uusimaa constituency. He voted against the further privatization of government owned companies as well as against the Lisbon treaty, both of which were supported by the party.

On 11 November 2010 Uusipaavalniemi defected from the Centre Party and joined the ranks of the True Finns Party. He was not reelected in the 2011 election.

== Personal life ==
Uusipaavalniemi lives in Helsinki. He is divorced and has three children. His older brother Jussi taught him how to curl.

== Awards ==
- Colin Campbell Award: 1998, 2003
- Markku of the Year, 2002. The award is given by an association of people named Markku.
