= 2013 World Senior Curling Championships – Men's tournament =

2013 World Senior Curling Championships Men's tournament
- Host city: Fredericton, New Brunswick
- Arena: Grant-Harvey Centre
- Dates: April 13–20, 2013
- Winner: Canada
- Curling club: Red Deer Curling Centre, Red Deer
- Skip: Rob Armitage
- Third: Randy Ponich
- Second: Wilf Edgar
- Lead: Keith Glover
- Alternate: Lyle Trieber
- Finalist: New Zealand (Hans Frauenlob)

The men's tournament of the 2013 World Senior Curling Championships will be held at the Grant-Harvey Centre in Fredericton, New Brunswick from April 13 to 20.

== Teams ==
The teams are listed as follows:

=== Pool A ===
Czech Republic	France	Ireland	Italy	Japan
Skip: Aleš Plešek; Third: Jan Žolčȧk; Second: Petr Capoušek; Lead: Vratislav Cízl; Alternate: Luděk Hajtl	Skip: Patrick Boez; Third: Christophe Lehuenen; Second: Michel Cambray; Lead: Yvon Lebailly; Alternate: Pierre Perrin	Skip: Peter Wilson; Third: Peter J. D. Wilson; Second: Neil Fyfe; Lead: Tom Roche; Alternate: John Jo Kenny	Skip: Carlo Carrera; Third: Adriano Regis; Second: Pasquale Valli; Lead: Bruno Paulo Mosca; Alternate: Eraldo Quero	Skip: Masayasu Sato; Third: Tomiyasu Goshima; Second: Takahiro Hashimoto; Lead: Shozo Itoh; Alternate: Hisashi Urashima
Latvia	New Zealand	Norway	Scotland	Switzerland
Skip: Pēteris Šveisbergs; Third: Jānis Rēdlihs; Second: Aivars Purmalis; Lead: Ivars Černajs	Skip: Hans Frauenlob; Third: Lorne De Pape; Second: Allan Langille; Lead: Pat Cooney; Alternate: Dan Mustapic	Skip: Tormod Andreassen; Third: Kjell Berg; Second: Stig-Arne Gunnestad; Lead: Halvard Kverne	Skip: David Hay; Third: Norman Brown; Second: Andrew McQuistin; Lead: Hugh Aitken; Alternate: Gordon Muirhead	Skip: Werner Attinger; Third: Peter Attinger; Second: Ronny Müller; Lead: Toni Knobel; Alternate: Bernhard Attinger

=== Pool B ===
Australia	Canada	Denmark	England	Finland
Skip: Hugh Millikin; Third: Jim Allan; Second: Steve Hewitt; Lead: Dan Hogan; Alternate: Wyatt Buck	Skip: Rob Armitage; Third: Keith Glover; Second: Randy Ponich; Lead: Wilf Edgar; Alternate: Lyle Treiber	Skip: Bent Juul Kristoffersen; Third: Hans Anton Jørgensen; Second: Bernd Hausted; Lead: John Hansen	Skip: Michael Sutherland; Third: Tommy Campbell; Second: John Summers; Lead: Charles Jackson; Alternate: Alastair Fyfe	Skip: Kari Keränen; Third: Jaakko Lemettinen; Second: Ari Pitko; Lead: Matti Virtaala; Alternate: Kari Kuskelin
Germany	Netherlands	Russia	Sweden	United States
Skip: Klaus Unterstab; Third: Uli Sutor; Second: Lenard Schulze; Lead: Matthias Steiner; Alternate: Andreas Helwig	Skip: Wim Neeleman; Third: Frank Kerkvliet; Second: Jos Wilmot; Lead: Bas Bennis	Skip: Sergey Korolenko; Third: Sergey Narudinov; Second: Mikhail Rivkind; Lead: Oleg Badilin; Alternate: Aleksander Kolesnikov	Skip: Karl Nordlund; Third: Wolger Johansson; Second: Lars-Åke Andersson; Lead: Hans Öberg; Alternate: Per-Arne Andersson	Skip: Gert Messing; Third: Dennis Mellerup; Second: Donald Nickle; Lead: Bill Peskoff; Alternate: Paul Pustovar

== Round-robin standings ==
Final round-robin standings

Key
Teams to Playoffs

Pool A	Skip	W	L
New Zealand	Hans Frauenlob	8	1
Switzerland	Werner Attinger	7	2
Norway	Tormod Andreassen	5	3
Ireland	Peter Wilson	5	4
Scotland	David Hay	4	3
Japan	Masayasu Sato	4	5
Italy	Carlo Carrera	3	5
Latvia	Pēteris Šveisbergs	3	5
Czech Republic	Aleš Plešek	1	7
France	Patrick Boez	1	7

Pool B	Skip	W	L
Canada	Rob Armitage	9	0
Sweden	Karl Nordlund	8	1
Australia	Hugh Millikin	6	3
Finland	Kari Keränen	6	3
Denmark	Bent Juul Kristoffersen	5	4
United States	Gert Messing	4	5
Netherlands	Wim Neeleman	3	6
England	Michael Sutherland	3	6
Russia	Sergey Korolenko	1	8
Germany	Klaus Unterstab	0	9

== Round-robin results ==
All draw times are listed in Atlantic Daylight Time (UTC−3).

=== Draw 1 ===
Saturday, April 13, 8:30

Sheet A	1	2	3	4	5	6	7	8	Final
Finland (Keränen)	4	2	0	0	2	0	0	1	9
England (Sutherland)	0	0	1	1	0	2	2	0	6

Sheet B	1	2	3	4	5	6	7	8	Final
Denmark (Kristoffersen)	0	2	1	0	4	1	2	X	10
Russia (Korolenko)	1	0	0	0	0	0	0	X	1

Sheet C	1	2	3	4	5	6	7	8	Final
Sweden (Nordlund)	1	2	0	0	0	1	0	1	5
Netherlands (Neeleman)	0	0	1	1	0	0	1	0	3

Sheet D	1	2	3	4	5	6	7	8	Final
United States (Messing)	0	0	2	1	1	0	0	X	4
Australia (Millikin)	3	1	0	0	0	2	2	X	8

Sheet E	1	2	3	4	5	6	7	8	Final
Canada (Armitage)	1	2	0	2	1	1	3	X	10
Germany (Unterstab)	0	0	0	0	0	0	0	X	0

=== Draw 2 ===
Saturday, April 13, 12:00

Sheet A	1	2	3	4	5	6	7	8	Final
Ireland (Wilson)	1	0	1	0	0	0	1	2	5
Scotland (Hay)	0	3	0	1	0	0	0	0	4

Sheet A	1	2	3	4	5	6	7	8	9	10	Final
Latvia (Šveisbergs)	0	0	1	0	1	1	1	0	0	1	5
France (Boez)	0	1	0	2	0	0	0	1	0	0	4

Sheet C	1	2	3	4	5	6	7	8	Final
Japan (Sato)	2	1	1	0	0	3	0	X	7
Czech Republic (Plešek)	0	0	0	0	2	0	1	X	3

Sheet D	1	2	3	4	5	6	7	8	Final
Italy (Carrera)	0	1	0	1	0	2	0	0	4
New Zealand (Mustapic)	2	0	2	0	2	0	1	2	9

Sheet E	1	2	3	4	5	6	7	8	Final
Switzerland (Attinger)	3	0	1	0	1	0	2	X	7
Norway (Andreassen)	0	1	0	1	0	2	0	X	4

=== Draw 3 ===
Saturday, April 13, 16:00

Sheet A	1	2	3	4	5	6	7	8	Final
Denmark (Kristoffersen)	0	0	2	0	0	1	0	X	3
Sweden (Nordlund)	2	1	0	0	1	0	3	X	7

Sheet B	1	2	3	4	5	6	7	8	Final
Germany (Unterstab)	1	1	0	1	0	0	2	0	5
Australia (Millikin)	0	0	1	0	4	1	0	1	7

Sheet C	1	2	3	4	5	6	7	8	Final
Finland (Keränen)	0	0	0	0	1	0	1	X	2
Canada (Armitage)	0	0	2	2	0	3	0	X	7

Sheet D	1	2	3	4	5	6	7	8	Final
England (Sutherland)	1	1	1	0	0	3	1	X	7
Netherlands (Neeleman)	0	0	0	1	1	0	0	X	2

=== Draw 5 ===
Sunday, April 14, 8:30

Sheet A	1	2	3	4	5	6	7	8	Final
Japan (Sato)	0	0	2	0	0	2	0	2	6
Italy (Carrera)	0	0	0	2	1	0	2	0	5

Sheet B	1	2	3	4	5	6	7	8	Final
Ireland (Wilson)	0	2	0	0	2	0	0	0	4
Switzerland (Attinger)	0	0	1	0	0	2	1	1	5

Sheet C	1	2	3	4	5	6	7	8	Final
Scotland (Hay)	0	2	0	1	0	1	1	0	5
New Zealand (Mustapic)	2	0	0	0	2	0	0	2	6

Sheet D	1	2	3	4	5	6	7	8	Final
Norway (Andreassen)	0	0	3	0	3	0	3	X	9
France (Boez)	0	1	0	2	0	1	0	X	4

=== Draw 7 ===
Sunday, April 14, 15:30

Sheet A	1	2	3	4	5	6	7	8	Final
Russia (Korolenko)	0	1	0	2	0	1	0	0	4
Australia (Millikin)	1	0	1	0	2	0	0	1	5

Sheet B	1	2	3	4	5	6	7	8	Final
Canada (Armitage)	0	3	0	1	0	3	0	X	7
England (Sutherland)	0	0	1	0	1	0	1	X	3

Sheet C	1	2	3	4	5	6	7	8	Final
Germany (Unterstab)	0	1	0	0	0	2	0	X	3
United States (Messing)	2	0	4	1	1	0	3	X	11

Sheet D	1	2	3	4	5	6	7	8	9	Final
Sweden (Nordlund)	1	0	0	1	1	0	0	2	2	7
Finland (Keränen)	0	2	1	0	0	1	1	0	0	5

Sheet E	1	2	3	4	5	6	7	8	Final
Netherlands (Neeleman)	0	0	2	0	2	0	1	0	5
Denmark (Kristoffersen)	1	1	0	2	0	2	0	2	8

=== Draw 8 ===
Sunday, April 14, 19:00

Sheet A	1	2	3	4	5	6	7	8	Final
Switzerland (Attinger)	0	1	0	3	0	2	0	X	6
France (Boez)	1	0	1	0	1	0	1	X	4

Sheet B	1	2	3	4	5	6	7	8	Final
Czech Republic (Plešek)	3	0	0	0	0	2	0	X	5
Italy (Carrera)	0	4	1	3	3	0	3	X	14

Sheet C	1	2	3	4	5	6	7	8	Final
Latvia (Šveisbergs)	0	0	1	0	0	3	1	0	5
Norway (Andreassen)	2	1	0	2	1	0	0	3	9

Sheet D	1	2	3	4	5	6	7	8	Final
Scotland (Hay)	2	2	1	0	4	4	X	X	13
Japan (Sato)	0	0	0	1	0	0	X	X	1

Sheet E	1	2	3	4	5	6	7	8	Final
New Zealand (Mustapic)	0	1	1	1	1	0	1	0	5
Ireland (Wilson)	3	0	0	0	0	1	0	2	6

=== Draw 10 ===
Monday, April 15, 12:00

Sheet A	1	2	3	4	5	6	7	8	Final
Germany (Unterstab)	0	1	1	1	0	1	0	0	4
Denmark (Kristoffersen)	2	0	0	0	2	0	1	1	6

Sheet B	1	2	3	4	5	6	7	8	Final
Sweden (Nordlund)	2	0	3	0	0	1	0	0	6
United States (Messing)	0	1	0	1	1	0	2	0	5

Sheet C	1	2	3	4	5	6	7	8	Final
England (Sutherland)	0	3	1	1	3	0	1	0	9
Russia (Korolenko)	3	0	0	0	0	2	0	1	6

Sheet E	1	2	3	4	5	6	7	8	Final
Australia (Millikin)	2	1	0	1	0	1	0	1	6
Finland (Keränen)	0	0	1	0	2	0	1	0	4

=== Draw 11 ===
Monday, April 15, 15:30

Sheet A	1	2	3	4	5	6	7	8	Final
Latvia (Šveisbergs)	0	1	1	0	0	1	2	0	5
Ireland (Wilson)	2	0	0	3	1	0	0	1	7

Sheet C	1	2	3	4	5	6	7	8	Final
Italy (Carrera)	0	0	0	0	0	1	X	X	1
Switzerland (Attinger)	2	1	3	1	2	0	X	X	9

Sheet D	1	2	3	4	5	6	7	8	Final
New Zealand (Frauenlob)	1	0	3	3	1	0	1	X	9
Czech Republic (Plešek)	0	1	0	0	0	1	0	X	2

Sheet E	1	2	3	4	5	6	7	8	Final
France (Boez)	0	1	0	0	2	0	0	X	3
Japan (Sato)	3	0	1	0	0	3	1	X	8

=== Draw 12 ===
Monday, April 15, 19:00

Sheet A	1	2	3	4	5	6	7	8	Final
United States (Messing)	0	1	0	0	1	1	1	0	4
Netherlands (Neeleman)	1	0	1	2	0	0	0	1	5

Sheet B	1	2	3	4	5	6	7	8	Final
Finland (Keränen)	1	0	2	0	1	0	2	1	7
Germany (Unterstab)	0	1	0	2	0	1	0	0	4

Sheet C	1	2	3	4	5	6	7	8	Final
Canada (Armitage)	0	2	0	1	0	0	3	X	6
Australia (Millikin)	1	0	1	0	0	2	0	X	4

Sheet D	1	2	3	4	5	6	7	8	Final
Denmark (Kristoffersen)	0	2	0	1	1	0	0	X	4
England (Sutherland)	1	0	1	0	0	1	0	X	3

Sheet E	1	2	3	4	5	6	7	8	Final
Sweden (Nordlund)	1	0	1	1	0	4	0	X	7
Russia (Korolenko)	0	1	0	0	3	0	2	X	6

=== Draw 13 ===
Tuesday, April 16, 8:30

Sheet A	1	2	3	4	5	6	7	8	Final
Norway (Andreassen)	1	0	1	1	0	1	0	1	5
New Zealand (Frauenlob)	0	3	0	0	3	0	0	0	6

Sheet B	1	2	3	4	5	6	7	8	Final
Japan (Sato)	1	0	1	0	0	0	1	0	3
Latvia (Šveisbergs)	0	0	0	2	0	1	0	1	4

Sheet C	1	2	3	4	5	6	7	8	9	Final
Czech Republic (Plešek)	3	0	0	2	0	0	2	0	0	7
France (Boez)	0	2	1	0	1	1	0	2	1	8

Sheet D	1	2	3	4	5	6	7	8	Final
Ireland (Wilson)	1	0	1	0	0	1	0	0	3
Italy (Carrera)	0	1	0	1	1	0	1	1	5

Sheet E	1	2	3	4	5	6	7	8	9	Final
Scotland (Hay)	0	2	0	3	0	0	0	0	0	5
Switzerland (Attinger)	1	0	1	0	1	0	1	1	2	7

=== Draw 15 ===
Tuesday, April 16, 15:30

Sheet A	1	2	3	4	5	6	7	8	Final
Italy (Carrera)	1	0	0	0	0	1	0	2	4
Latvia (Šveisbergs)	0	0	0	2	1	0	0	0	3

Sheet B	1	2	3	4	5	6	7	8	Final
Switzerland (Attinger)	4	1	2	0	3	1	4	X	15
Czech Republic (Plešek)	0	0	0	1	0	0	0	X	1

Sheet C	1	2	3	4	5	6	7	8	9	Final
Norway (Andreassen)	0	1	0	1	0	1	1	0	1	5
Ireland (Wilson)	0	0	2	0	1	0	0	1	0	4

Sheet D	1	2	3	4	5	6	7	8	Final
France (Boez)	0	1	0	1	0	1	0	X	3
Scotland (Hay)	2	0	3	0	1	0	2	X	8

=== Draw 16 ===
Tuesday, April 16, 19:00

Sheet A	1	2	3	4	5	6	7	8	Final
England (Sutherland)	2	0	5	0	1	0	0	0	8
Germany (Unterstab)	0	1	0	2	0	1	1	1	6

Sheet B	1	2	3	4	5	6	7	8	Final
Russia (Korolenko)	1	0	0	0	1	0	2	X	4
Canada (Armitage)	0	0	2	2	0	2	0	X	6

Sheet C	1	2	3	4	5	6	7	8	9	Final
United States (Messing)	0	1	0	1	0	1	0	2	1	6
Denmark (Kristoffersen)	1	0	3	0	1	0	0	0	0	5

Sheet D	1	2	3	4	5	6	7	8	Final
Australia (Millikin)	0	0	0	1	0	1	0	X	2
Sweden (Nordlund)	0	0	1	0	2	0	4	X	7

Sheet E	1	2	3	4	5	6	7	8	Final
Finland (Keränen)	2	2	2	0	4	2	X	X	12
Netherlands (Neeleman)	0	0	0	1	0	0	X	X	1

=== Draw 18 ===
Wednesday, April 17, 12:00

Sheet B	1	2	3	4	5	6	7	8	Final
England (Sutherland)	0	0	0	1	0	0	X	X	1
Sweden (Nordlund)	2	1	2	0	1	3	X	X	9

Sheet C	1	2	3	4	5	6	7	8	Final
Netherlands (Neeleman)	1	1	1	0	4	0	0	X	7
Germany (Unterstab)	0	0	0	2	0	1	1	X	4

Sheet D	1	2	3	4	5	6	7	8	Final
Finland (Keränen)	1	0	2	0	0	0	1	X	4
Russia (Korolenko)	0	0	0	1	0	0	0	X	1

Sheet E	1	2	3	4	5	6	7	8	Final
Denmark (Kristoffersen)	0	0	2	0	2	1	1	X	6
Australia (Millikin)	0	0	0	1	0	0	0	X	1

=== Draw 19 ===
Wednesday, April 17, 15:30

Sheet A	1	2	3	4	5	6	7	8	9	Final
Czech Republic (Plešek)	0	0	2	1	0	1	0	1	1	6
Norway (Andreassen)	1	2	0	0	2	0	0	0	0	5

Sheet B	1	2	3	4	5	6	7	8	Final
Italy (Carrera)	1	0	0	0	1	0	0	X	2
Scotland (Hay)	0	1	1	2	0	0	1	X	5

Sheet C	1	2	3	4	5	6	7	8	Final
New Zealand (Frauenlob)	0	0	3	2	1	2	X	X	8
Latvia (Šveisbergs)	0	2	0	0	0	0	X	X	2

Sheet D	1	2	3	4	5	6	7	8	Final
Japan (Sato)	0	0	0	0	1	0	1	X	2
Switzerland (Attinger)	1	0	1	1	0	2	0	X	5

Sheet E	1	2	3	4	5	6	7	8	Final
Ireland (Wilson)	3	1	0	1	2	1	X	X	8
France (Boez)	0	0	1	0	0	0	X	X	1

=== Draw 20 ===
Wednesday, April 17, 19:00

Sheet A	1	2	3	4	5	6	7	8	9	Final
Netherlands (Neeleman)	1	0	0	0	1	2	0	0	1	5
Russia (Korolenko)	0	0	1	0	0	0	2	1	0	4

Sheet B	1	2	3	4	5	6	7	8	Final
United States (Messing)	0	0	0	3	1	0	1	0	5
Finland (Keränen)	1	0	2	0	0	2	0	2	7

Sheet C	1	2	3	4	5	6	7	8	Final
Australia (Millikin)	1	1	2	0	1	1	0	X	6
England (Sutherland)	0	0	0	1	0	0	1	X	2

Sheet D	1	2	3	4	5	6	7	8	Final
Canada (Armitage)	0	2	0	2	0	0	2	X	6
Denmark (Kristoffersen)	1	0	1	0	0	1	0	X	3

Sheet E	1	2	3	4	5	6	7	8	Final
Germany (Unterstab)	1	0	0	1	0	1	1	0	4
Sweden (Nordlund)	0	1	1	0	1	0	0	3	6

=== Draw 21 ===
Thursday, April 18, 8:30

Sheet A	1	2	3	4	5	6	7	8	Final
Scotland (Hay)	3	4	2	0	2	2	X	X	13
Czech Republic (Plešek)	0	0	0	1	0	0	X	X	1

Sheet B	1	2	3	4	5	6	7	8	Final
France (Boez)	0	1	0	1	0	2	X	X	4
New Zealand (Mustapic)	4	0	5	0	2	0	X	X	11

Sheet C	1	2	3	4	5	6	7	8	Final
Ireland (Wilson)	1	1	0	0	0	2	0	X	4
Japan (Sato)	0	0	2	1	2	0	3	X	8

Sheet D	1	2	3	4	5	6	7	8	Final
Switzerland (Attinger)	3	0	2	1	0	0	0	X	6
Latvia (Šveisbergs)	0	2	0	0	2	1	3	X	8

Sheet E	1	2	3	4	5	6	7	8	Final
Norway (Andreassen)	2	1	0	2	1	1	3	X	10
Italy (Carrera)	0	0	1	0	0	0	0	X	1

=== Draw 22 ===
Thursday, April 18, 12:00

Sheet A	1	2	3	4	5	6	7	8	Final
Sweden (Nordlund)	0	1	0	0	0	1	0	X	2
Canada (Armitage)	2	0	0	3	0	0	0	X	5

Sheet B	1	2	3	4	5	6	7	8	Final
Australia (Millikin)	3	0	1	0	1	0	0	X	5
Netherlands (Neeleman)	0	1	0	1	0	1	0	X	3

Sheet C	1	2	3	4	5	6	7	8	Final
Denmark (Kristoffersen)	0	1	0	0	2	0	0	X	3
Finland (Keränen)	2	0	3	0	0	0	3	X	8

Sheet D	1	2	3	4	5	6	7	8	Final
Russia (Korolenko)	1	0	0	0	3	1	1	X	6
Germany (Unterstab)	0	1	0	2	0	0	0	X	3

Sheet E	1	2	3	4	5	6	7	8	Final
United States (Messing)	0	2	1	2	3	0	0	X	8
England (Sutherland)	2	0	0	0	0	1	0	X	3

=== Draw 24 ===
Thursday, April 18, 19:00

Sheet A	1	2	3	4	5	6	7	8	Final
New Zealand (Mustapic)	3	0	1	2	0	1	X	X	7
Switzerland (Attinger)	0	2	0	0	1	0	X	X	3

Sheet B	1	2	3	4	5	6	7	8	9	Final
Norway (Andreassen)	0	0	1	1	1	0	1	1	1	6
Japan (Sato)	1	1	0	0	0	3	0	0	0	5

Sheet D	1	2	3	4	5	6	7	8	Final
Czech Republic (Plešek)	1	0	0	1	0	0	X	X	2
Ireland (Wilson)	0	3	4	0	3	1	X	X	11

Sheet E	1	2	3	4	5	6	7	8	9	Final
Latvia (Šveisbergs)	0	1	0	0	4	0	0	1	0	6
Scotland (Hay)	1	0	2	1	0	1	1	0	3	9

=== Draw 25 ===
Friday, April 19, 8:30

Sheet C	1	2	3	4	5	6	7	8	Final
Russia (Korolenko)	1	0	1	0	0	1	0	X	3
United States (Messing)	0	2	0	3	0	0	2	X	7

Sheet D	1	2	3	4	5	6	7	8	Final
Netherlands (Neeleman)	0	0	0	1	0	1	X	X	2
Canada (Armitage)	0	3	1	0	4	0	X	X	8

Sheet E	1	2	3	4	5	6	7	8	Final
Japan (Sato)	0	3	0	0	1	1	1	X	6
New Zealand (Frauenlob)	2	0	4	4	0	0	0	X	10

=== Draw 27 ===
Friday, April 19, 15:30

Sheet A	1	2	3	4	5	6	7	8	Final
Canada (Armitage)	0	2	1	0	2	2	0	X	7
United States (Messing)	1	0	0	2	0	0	2	X	5

Sheet B	1	2	3	4	5	6	7	8	Final
Scotland (Hay)	1	0	2	0	2	0	0	1	6
Norway (Andreassen)	0	2	0	1	0	0	2	0	5

Sheet C	1	2	3	4	5	6	7	8	Final
France (Boez)	0	0	1	0	1	0	1	X	3
Italy (Carrera)	2	0	0	2	0	1	0	X	5

Sheet E	1	2	3	4	5	6	7	8	Final
Czech Republic (Plešek)	0	1	0	1	0	0	X	X	2
Latvia (Šveisbergs)	4	0	3	0	0	4	X	X	11

== Playoffs ==
Semifinals
A1	Canada	11
B2	Switzerland	3
B1	New Zealand	10
A2	Sweden	2

Gold Medal Game
A1	Canada	6
B1	New Zealand	4
Bronze Medal Game
B2	Switzerland	7
A2	Sweden	2

=== Semifinals ===
Saturday, April 20, 8:00

Sheet A	1	2	3	4	5	6	7	8	Final
Canada (Armitage)	2	0	2	2	0	5	X	X	11
Switzerland (Attinger)	0	2	0	0	1	0	X	X	3

Sheet B	1	2	3	4	5	6	7	8	Final
New Zealand (Frauenlob)	5	1	0	1	1	2	X	X	10
Sweden (Nordlund)	0	0	2	0	0	0	X	X	2

=== Bronze medal game ===
Saturday, April 20, 14:00

Sheet E	1	2	3	4	5	6	7	8	Final
Switzerland (Attinger)	1	0	0	1	0	4	1	X	7
Sweden (Nordlund)	0	1	0	0	1	0	0	X	2

=== Gold medal game ===
Saturday, April 20, 14:00

Sheet D	1	2	3	4	5	6	7	8	Final
Canada (Armitage)	0	0	2	1	0	3	0	0	6
New Zealand (Frauenlob)	0	1	0	0	1	0	1	1	4
