= Continental Cup (curling) =

International curling tournament

- Established: 2001
- Abolished: 2022

The Continental Cup was a curling tournament held annually between teams from North America (sometimes just Canada) against teams from the rest of the World (sometimes just Europe). Each side is represented by six teams (three women's teams and three men's teams), which compete using a unique points system. The tournament is modeled after golf's Ryder Cup, but unlike the Ryder Cup, the Continental Cup has never been held outside of North America nor has it been a regular, biennial event. The inaugural Continental Cup was held in 2002 but was held only three times between 2005 and 2010. Since 2011, however, the Continental Cup has been an annual competition.

Conceived as a joint collaboration between Curling Canada, World Curling Federation, and United States Curling Association, it has been operated solely by Curling Canada since 2015.

As of 2020, Team North America/Team Canada has won the Continental Cup ten times. Team World/Europe has won the Cup six times.

The event was last held in 2020, and was cancelled twice during the COVID-19 pandemic. Curling Canada announced that the event will not go ahead for the 2022–23 season.

== Competition overview ==
The Continental Cup pits curling teams from North America in a competition against teams from Europe and Asia, with each side of the competition represented by six curling teams. For the majority of the Continental Cup competitions, Team North America has competed against a varied combination of teams designated as Team World. Team Canada has exclusively represented North America twice (2015 & 2020). During those same years, a formally designated Team Europe has been the opponent, though in many years the team formally named as Team World has only been represented by teams from European nations (2002–2007, 2013 and 2019). In all other years where Team World was formed, teams from China or Japan competed in the Continental Cup.

Curling Canada determines Team Canada's participants, based on previous Canada Cup, national championship, and CTRS standings. Team World's and Team Europe's representatives are generally determined by the World Curling Federation. For Team World/Europe, Sweden is the only country to have been formally been represented in each of the Continental Cup competitions, but only because Niklas Edin joined team Scotland in 2007, which was skipped by David Murdoch. Murdoch's team also welcomed Edin to form a Scotland-Sweden team in 2008, though Anette Norberg returned to the competition that year as well to represent Sweden. In 2011, Murdoch also skipped a Scottish-Swiss-German team composed of Ralph Stöckli, Andreas Lang, and Simon Strübin.

A list of the championships illustrates the variations in the competition's participants over the last two decades. It also illustrates that the majority of events have taken place in Canada, though four have taken place in the United States (in Las Vegas, Nevada).

| Year | Venue | North America | Score | World / Europe |
|---|---|---|---|---|
| 2002 | Regina, Saskatchewan | (Canada) David Nedohin, Randy Ferbey, Scott Pfeifer, Marcel Rocque (Canada) Colleen Jones, Kim Kelly, Mary-Anne Waye, Nancy Delahunt (United States) Patti Lank, Erika Brown, Nicole Joraanstad, Natalie Nicholson (Canada) Kelley Law, Julie Skinner, Georgina Wheatcroft, Diane Dezura (Canada) Kevin Martin, Don Walchuk, Carter Rycroft, Don Bartlett (United States) Paul Pustovar, Mike Fraboni, Geoff Goodland, Richard Maskel | 207–193 | (Switzerland) Luzia Ebnöther, Carmen Küng, Tanya Frei, Nadia Röthlisberger (Sweden) Elisabet Gustafson, Katarina Nyberg, Louise Marmont, Elisabeth Persson (Sweden) Peja Lindholm, Tomas Nordin, Magnus Swartling, Peter Narup (Scotland) Hammy McMillan, Norman Brown, Hugh Aitken, Roger McIntyre (Scotland) Rhona Martin, Debbie Knox, Fiona MacDonald, Janice Rankin (Norway) Pål Trulsen, Lars Vågberg, Flemming Davanger, Bent Ånund Ramsfjell |
| 2003 | Thunder Bay, Ontario | (Canada) Mark Dacey, Bruce Lohnes, Rob Harris, Andrew Gibson (Canada) David Nedohin, Randy Ferbey, Scott Pfeifer, Marcel Rocque (United States) Pete Fenson, Eric Fenson, Shawn Rojeski, John Shuster (Canada) Colleen Jones, Kim Kelly, Mary-Anne Waye, Nancy Delahunt (United States) Debbie McCormick, Allison Pottinger, Ann Swisshelm Silver, Tracy Sachtjen (Canada) Sherry Middaugh, Kirsten Wall, Andrea Lawes, Sheri Cordina | 179–208 | (Sweden) Peja Lindholm, Tomas Nordin, Magnus Swartling, Peter Narup (Scotland) Jackie Lockhart, Shelia Swan, Katriona Fairweather, Anne Laird (Scotland) Hammy McMillan, Norman Brown, Hugh Aitken, Roger McIntyre (Norway) Dordi Nordby, Hanne Woods, Marianne Haslum, Camilla Holth (Sweden) Anette Norberg, Eva Lund, Cathrine Norberg, Helena Lingham (Norway) Pål Trulsen, Lars Vågberg, Flemming Davanger, Bent Ånund Ramsfjell |
| 2004 | Medicine Hat, Alberta | (Canada) Mark Dacey, Bruce Lohnes, Rob Harris, Andrew Gibson (Canada) David Nedohin, Randy Ferbey, Scott Pfeifer, Marcel Rocque (Canada) Colleen Jones, Kim Kelly, Mary-Anne Waye, Nancy Delahunt (United States) Patti Lank, Erika Brown, Nicole Joraanstad, Natalie Nicholson (Canada) Marie-France Larouche, Karo Gagnon, Annie Lemay, Véronique Grégoire (United States) Jason Larway, Doug Pottinger, Joel Larway, Bill Todhunter | 228–172 | (Switzerland) Luzia Ebnöther, Carmen Küng, Yvonne Schlunegger, Laurence Bidaud (Sweden) Peja Lindholm, Tomas Nordin, Magnus Swartling, Peter Narup (Scotland) David Murdoch, Craig Wilson, Neil Murdoch, Euan Byers (Norway) Dordi Nordby, Linn Githmark, Marianne Haslum, Camilla Holth (Sweden) Anette Norberg, Eva Lund, Cathrine Lindahl, Anna Bergström (Germany) Sebastian Stock, Daniel Herberg, Stephan Knoll, Patrick Hoffman |
| 2006 | Chilliwack, British Columbia | (United States) Pete Fenson, Shawn Rojeski, Joe Polo, Doug Pottinger (Canada) Brad Gushue, Mark Nichols, Russ Howard, Jamie Korab (Canada) Shannon Kleibrink, Amy Nixon, Bronwen Saunders, Christine Keshen (United States) Debbie McCormick, Nicole Joraanstad, Natalie Nicholson, Tracy Sachtjen (Canada) Jean-Michel Ménard, François Roberge, Éric Sylvain, Maxime Elmaleh (Canada) Kelly Scott, Jeanna Schraeder, Sasha Carter, Renee Simons | 171–229 | (Scotland) David Murdoch, Ewan MacDonald, Peter Smith, Euan Byers (Sweden) Anette Norberg, Eva Lund, Cathrine Lindahl, Anna Svärd (Switzerland) Mirjam Ott, Binia Feltscher-Beeli, Valeria Spälty, Janine Greiner (Germany) Andrea Schöpp, Monika Wagner, Anna Hartelt, Tina Tichatschke (Norway) Pål Trulsen, Lars Vågberg, Flemming Davanger, Bent Ånund Ramsfjell (Finland) Markku Uusipaavalniemi, Kalle Kiiskinen, Jani Sullanmaa, Teemu Salo |
| 2007 | Medicine Hat, Alberta | (United States) Todd Birr, Bill Todhunter, Greg Johnson, Kevin Birr (Canada) Randy Ferbey, David Nedohin, Scott Pfeifer, Marcel Rocque (Canada) Glenn Howard, Richard Hart, Brent Laing, Craig Savill (Canada) Jennifer Jones, Cathy Overton-Clapham, Jill Officer, Dawn Askin (United States) Debbie McCormick, Allison Pottinger, Nicole Joraanstad, Natalie Nicholson (Canada) Kelly Scott, Jeanna Schraeder, Sasha Carter, Renee Simons | 290–110 | (Denmark) Angelina Jensen, Madeleine Dupont, Denise Dupont, Camilla Jensen (Germany) Andy Kapp, Andreas Lang, Holger Höhne, Andreas Kempf (Scotland) (Sweden) David Murdoch, Niklas Edin, Peter Smith, Euan Byers (Russia) Liudmila Privivkova, Olga Zharkova, Nkeiruka Ezekh, Ekaterina Galkina (Switzerland) Andreas Schwaller, Ralph Stöckli, Thomas Lips, Damian Grichting (Scotland) Kelly Wood, Jackie Lockhart, Lorna Vevers, Lindsay Wood |
| 2008 | Camrose, Alberta | (United States) Craig Brown, Rich Ruohonen, John Dunlop, Peter Annis (Canada) Stefanie Lawton, Marliese Kasner, Teejay Surik, Lana Vey (United States) Debbie McCormick, Allison Pottinger, Nicole Joraanstad, Tracy Sachtjen (Canada) Jennifer Jones, Cathy Overton-Clapham, Jill Officer, Dawn Askin (Canada) Kevin Koe, Blake MacDonald, Carter Rycroft, Nolan Thiessen (Canada) Kevin Martin, John Morris, Marc Kennedy, Ben Hebert | 192–208 | (Scotland) (Sweden) David Murdoch, Ewan MacDonald, Niklas Edin, Euan Byers (Sweden) Anette Norberg, Kajsa Bergström, Cathrine Lindahl, Anna Svard (Switzerland) Mirjam Ott, Carmen Schäfer, Valeria Spalty, Janine Greiner (Norway) Thomas Ulsrud, Torger Nergård, Christoffer Svae, Havard Vad Petersson (China) Wang Bingyu, Liu Yin, Yue Qingshuang, Zhou Yan (China) Wang Fengchun, Liu Rui, Xu Xiaoming, Zang Jialiang |
| 2011 | St. Albert, Alberta | (Canada) Cheryl Bernard, Susan O'Connor, Carolyn Darbyshire, Cori Morris (United States) Erika Brown, Nina Spatola, Ann Swisshelm, Laura Hallisey (United States) Pete Fenson, Shawn Rojeski, Joe Polo, Ryan Brunt (Canada) Jennifer Jones, Kaitlyn Lawes, Jill Officer, Dawn Askin (Canada) Kevin Koe, Blake MacDonald, Carter Rycroft, Nolan Thiessen (Canada) Kevin Martin, John Morris, Marc Kennedy, Ben Hebert | 298–102 | (Sweden) Niklas Edin, Sebastian Kraupp, Fredrik Lindberg, Viktor Kjäll (Scotland) (Switzerland) (Germany) David Murdoch, Ralph Stöckli, Andreas Lang, Simon Strübin (Switzerland) Mirjam Ott, Carmen Schäfer, Carmen Küng, Janine Greiner (Germany) Andrea Schöpp, Monika Wagner, Corinna Scholz, Stella Heiss (Norway) Thomas Ulsrud, Torger Nergård, Christoffer Svae, Håvard Vad Petersson (China) Wang Bingyu, Liu Yin, Yue Qingshuang, Zhou Yan |
| 2012 | Langley, British Columbia | (United States) Pete Fenson, Shawn Rojeski, Joe Polo, Ryan Brunt (Canada) Amber Holland, Kim Schneider, Tammy Schneider, Heather Kalenchuk (Canada) Glenn Howard, Wayne Middaugh, Brent Laing, Craig Savill (United States) Patti Lank, Nina Spatola, Caitlin Maroldo, Mackenzie Lank (Canada) Stefanie Lawton, Sherry Anderson, Sherri Singler, Marliese Kasner (Canada) Jeff Stoughton, Jon Mead, Reid Carruthers, Ben Hebert | 165–235 | (Scotland) Tom Brewster, Greg Drummond, Scott Andrews, Michael Goodfellow (Sweden) Niklas Edin, Sebastian Kraupp, Fredrik Lindberg, Viktor Kjäll (Scotland) Eve Muirhead, Anna Sloan, Vicki Adams, Claire Hamilton (Sweden) Anette Norberg, Cecilia Östlund, Sara Carlsson, Liselotta Lennartsson (Norway) Thomas Ulsrud, Torger Nergård, Christoffer Svae, Håvard Vad Petersson (China) Wang Bingyu, Sun Yue, Yue Qingshuang, Zhou Yan |
| 2013 | Penticton, British Columbia | (Canada) Glenn Howard, Wayne Middaugh, Brent Laing, Craig Savill (Canada) Jennifer Jones, Kaitlyn Lawes, Jill Officer, Dawn Askin (Canada) Kevin Martin, John Morris, Marc Kennedy, Ben Hebert (United States) Heath McCormick, Bill Stopera, Martin Sather, Dean Gemmell (Canada) Heather Nedohin, Beth Iskiw, Jessica Mair, Laine Peters (United States) Allison Pottinger, Nicole Joraanstad, Natalie Nicholson, Tabitha Peterson | 37–23 | (Scotland) Tom Brewster, Greg Drummond, Scott Andrews, Michael Goodfellow (Sweden) Niklas Edin, Sebastian Kraupp, Fredrik Lindberg, Viktor Kjäll (Scotland) Eve Muirhead, Anna Sloan, Vicki Adams, Claire Hamilton (Switzerland) Mirjam Ott, Carmen Schäfer, Carmen Küng, Janine Greiner (Sweden) Margaretha Sigfridsson, Maria Prytz, Christina Bertrup, Maria Wennerström (Norway) Thomas Ulsrud, Torger Nergård, Christoffer Svae, Håvard Vad Petersson |
| 2014 | Las Vegas, Nevada | (United States) Erika Brown, Debbie McCormick, Jessica Schultz, Ann Swisshelm (Canada) Rachel Homan, Emma Miskew, Alison Kreviazuk, Lisa Weagle (Canada) Brad Jacobs, Ryan Fry, E. J. Harnden, Ryan Harnden (Canada) Jennifer Jones, Kaitlyn Lawes, Jill Officer, Dawn McEwen (United States) John Shuster, Jeff Isaacson, Jared Zezel, John Landsteiner (Canada) Jeff Stoughton, Jon Mead, Reid Carruthers, Mark Nichols | 36–24 | (Sweden) Niklas Edin, Sebastian Kraupp, Fredrik Lindberg, Viktor Kjäll (Japan) Satsuki Fujisawa, Miyo Ichikawa, Emi Shimizu, Chiaki Matsumura (Scotland) Eve Muirhead, Anna Sloan, Vicki Adams, Claire Hamilton (Scotland) David Murdoch, Tom Brewster, Greg Drummond, Scott Andrews (Sweden) Margaretha Sigfridsson, Maria Prytz, Christina Bertrup, Maria Wennerström (Norway) Thomas Ulsrud, Torger Nergård, Christoffer Svae, Håvard Vad Petersson |
| Year | Venue | Canada | Score | Europe |
| 2015 | Calgary, Alberta | (Ontario) Rachel Homan, Emma Miskew, Joanne Courtney, Lisa Weagle (Ontario) Brad Jacobs, Ryan Fry, E. J. Harnden, Ryan Harnden (Manitoba) Jennifer Jones, Kaitlyn Lawes, Jill Officer, Dawn McEwen (Manitoba) Mike McEwen, B. J. Neufeld, Matt Wozniak, Ben Hebert (Alberta) John Morris, Pat Simmons, Carter Rycroft, Nolan Thiessen (Alberta) Valerie Sweeting, Lori Olson-Johns, Dana Ferguson, Rachelle Brown | 42–18 | (Sweden) Niklas Edin, Oskar Eriksson, Kristian Lindström, Christoffer Sundgren (Scotland) Eve Muirhead, Anna Sloan, Vicki Adams, Sarah Reid (Scotland) David Murdoch, Greg Drummond, Scott Andrews, Michael Goodfellow (Russia) Anna Sidorova, Margarita Fomina, Alexandra Saitova, Ekaterina Galkina (Sweden) Margaretha Sigfridsson, Maria Prytz, Christina Bertrup, Maria Wennerström (Norway) Thomas Ulsrud, Torger Nergård, Christoffer Svae, Håvard Vad Petersson |
| Year | Venue | North America | Score | World |
| 2016 | Las Vegas, Nevada | (Canada) Jennifer Jones, Kaitlyn Lawes, Jill Officer, Dawn McEwen (Canada) Rachel Homan, Emma Miskew, Joanne Courtney, Lisa Weagle (United States) Erika Brown, Allison Pottinger, Nicole Joraanstad, Natalie Nicholson (Canada) Kevin Koe, Marc Kennedy, Brent Laing, Ben Hebert (Canada) Pat Simmons, John Morris, Carter Rycroft, Nolan Thiessen (United States) John Shuster, Tyler George, Matt Hamilton, John Landsteiner | 30½–29½ | (Switzerland) Alina Pätz, Nadine Lehmann, Marisa Winkelhausen, Nicole Schwägli (Scotland) Eve Muirhead, Anna Sloan, Vicki Adams, Sarah Reid (Sweden) Niklas Edin, Oskar Eriksson, Kristian Lindström, Christoffer Sundgren (Japan) Ayumi Ogasawara, Sayaka Yoshimura, Kaho Onodera, Anna Ohmiya (Norway) Thomas Ulsrud, Torger Nergård, Christoffer Svae, Håvard Vad Petersson (China) Zang Jialiang, Xu Xiaoming, Ba Dexin, Wang Jinbo |
| 2017 | Las Vegas, Nevada | (Canada) Kevin Koe, Marc Kennedy, Brent Laing, Ben Hebert (United States) Heath McCormick, Chris Plys, Korey Dropkin, Tom Howell (Canada) Reid Carruthers, Braeden Moskowy, Derek Samagalski, Colin Hodgson (Canada) Chelsea Carey, Amy Nixon, Jocelyn Peterman, Laine Peters (United States) Jamie Sinclair, Alex Carlson, Vicky Persinger, Monica Walker (Canada) Jennifer Jones, Kaitlyn Lawes, Jill Officer, Dawn McEwen | 37–23 | (Denmark) Rasmus Stjerne, Johnny Frederiksen, Oliver Dupont, Troels Harry (Sweden) Niklas Edin, Oskar Eriksson, Rasmus Wranå, Christoffer Sundgren (Norway) Thomas Ulsrud, Torger Nergård, Christoffer Svae, Håvard Vad Petersson (Sweden) Anna Hasselborg, Sara McManus, Agnes Knochenhauer, Sofia Mabergs (Japan) Satsuki Fujisawa, Mari Motohashi, Chinami Yoshida, Yurika Yoshida (Switzerland) Binia Feltscher, Irene Schori, Franziska Kaufmann, Christine Urech |
| 2018 | London, Ontario | (Canada) Kevin Koe, Marc Kennedy, Brent Laing, Ben Hebert (United States) John Shuster, Tyler George, Matt Hamilton, John Landsteiner (Canada) Brad Gushue, Mark Nichols, Brett Gallant, Geoff Walker (Canada) Rachel Homan, Emma Miskew, Joanne Courtney, Lisa Weagle (United States) Nina Roth, Tabitha Peterson, Aileen Geving, Becca Hamilton (Canada) Michelle Englot, Kate Cameron, Leslie Wilson-Westcott, Raunora Westcott | 30½–30^{[1]} | (Switzerland) Peter de Cruz, Benoît Schwarz, Claudio Pätz, Valentin Tanner (Sweden) Niklas Edin, Oskar Eriksson, Rasmus Wranå, Christoffer Sundgren (Norway) Thomas Ulsrud, Torger Nergård, Christoffer Svae, Håvard Vad Petersson (Sweden) Anna Hasselborg, Sara McManus, Agnes Knochenhauer, Sofia Mabergs (Japan) Satsuki Fujisawa, Mari Motohashi, Chinami Yoshida, Yurika Yoshida (Switzerland) Silvana Tirinzoni, Manuela Siegrist, Esther Neuenschwander, Marlene Albrecht |
| 2019 | Las Vegas, Nevada | (Canada) Brad Gushue, Mark Nichols, Brett Gallant, Geoff Walker (Canada) Rachel Homan, Emma Miskew, Joanne Courtney, Lisa Weagle (Canada) Jennifer Jones, Kaitlyn Lawes, Jocelyn Peterman, Dawn McEwen (Canada) Kevin Koe, B.J. Neufeld, Colton Flasch, Ben Hebert (United States) John Shuster, Christopher Plys, Matt Hamilton, John Landsteiner (United States) Jamie Sinclair, Sarah Anderson, Taylor Anderson, Monica Walker | 26–34 | (Switzerland) Peter de Cruz, Benoît Schwarz, Sven Michel, Valentin Tanner (Sweden) Niklas Edin, Oskar Eriksson, Rasmus Wranå, Christoffer Sundgren (Sweden) Anna Hasselborg, Sara McManus, Agnes Knochenhauer, Sofia Mabergs (Scotland) Bruce Mouat, Grant Hardie, Bobby Lammie, Hammy McMillan Jr. (Scotland) Eve Muirhead, Jennifer Dodds, Vicki Chalmers, Lauren Gray (Switzerland) Silvana Tirinzoni, Alina Pätz, Esther Neuenschwander, Melanie Barbezat |
| Year | Venue | Canada | Score | Europe |
| 2020 | London, Ontario | (Alberta) Brendan Bottcher, Darren Moulding, Brad Thiessen, Karrick Martin (Alberta) Chelsea Carey, Sarah Wilkes, Dana Ferguson, Rachel Brown (Ontario) John Epping, Ryan Fry, Matt Camm, Brent Laing (Manitoba) Tracy Fleury, Selena Njegovan, Liz Fyfe, Kristin MacCuish (Ontario) Rachel Homan, Emma Miskew, Joanne Courtney, Lisa Weagle (Alberta) Kevin Koe, B. J. Neufeld, Colton Flasch, Ben Hebert | 22.5–37.5 | (Switzerland) Peter de Cruz, Benoît Schwarz, Sven Michel, Valentin Tanner (Sweden) Niklas Edin, Oskar Eriksson, Rasmus Wranå, Christoffer Sundgren (Sweden) Anna Hasselborg, Sara McManus, Agnes Knochenhauer, Sofia Mabergs (Scotland) Bruce Mouat, Grant Hardie, Bobby Lammie, Hammy McMillan Jr. (Scotland) Eve Muirhead, Lauren Gray, Jennifer Dodds, Vicky Wright (Switzerland) Silvana Tirinzoni, Alina Pätz, Esther Neuenschwander, Melanie Barbezat |
| 2021 | Oakville, Ontario | Cancelled due to the COVID-19 pandemic in Canada | | |
| 2022 | Fredericton, New Brunswick | Cancelled due to the COVID-19 pandemic and isolation requirements for attendance at the 2022 Winter Olympics | | |

^{1} The event was tied 30–30 after completion of the skins events, so to break the tie, each team selected one thrower to draw to the button, with North America's Brad Gushue coming closer to Team World's Thomas Ulsrud.

== Competition format and scoring ==
Currently, the Continental Cup competition consists of five event categories in eleven draws taking place over four days. The events include (1) two draws of traditional team play (one men's and one women's), (2) two draws of team scrambles (one men's and one women's), (3) three draws of mixed doubles, (4) two mixed team scrambles, and (5) two skins games. Each draw of each event contributes to a single overall score for the competing teams. For either team to claim the Continental Cup, therefore, a minimum majority of the points must be cumulatively attained from the results in the combined events over eleven draws.

The current points system was implemented in 2013. The minimum majority of the points is 30½ points. Currently, for the first nine draws, all match-ups earn only one point for the winner, and a half-point for a tie. In 2019, the Competition had an extra mixed doubles draw and one draw of mixed scrambles, fifteen points were allocated to each skins draw. The 2020 reorganization establishing the current format also allowed the scoring to allocate 18 points for the final skins draw. As a result, only 27 points are now available over the first three days and nine draws, with 33 points available on the final day in the skins games.

The current competition evolved through different formats. Historically, the Cup consisted of four events – teams, mixed doubles, team scrambles, and "singles", the last of these being contests in which the teams competed in a series of skills. The two major changes were the elimination of the singles events, and the reduction of traditional team play, with increased mixed doubles and introduction of mixed scrambles. Prior to 2013, the minimum majority of the points was also 201 points. The format and scoring were revamped to heighten the stakes of each day of play, with the highest stakes on the final day of competition.

=== Teams ===
The traditional team component of the Continental Cup currently consists of six eight-end games, with each team playing a single traditional game. One point is awarded to the winner, with a half point if the game is tied after eight ends.

Prior to 2013, there were only twelve team curling games, with six points awarded to the winner of each game. From 2013 to 2018 there were eighteen team games split into six draws. In 2019, twelve of these games were replaced by two rounds of team scrambles, one round of mixed scrambles (3 games) and an extra round of mixed doubles. Thus, as of 2019, each of the teams in their normal tour constellations only competed as such once. Currently, the remainder of the four person teams are allocated to team scrambles (two draws, one men's and one women's) and two mixed scrambles (currently two draws).

==== Results ====
| Year | Team winner | Points |
|---|---|---|
| 2002 | North America | 48–24 |
| 2003 | Europe | 42–30 |
| 2004 | North America | 45–27 |
| 2006 | Tie | 36–36 |
| 2007 | Tie | 36–36 |
| 2008 | World | 45–27 |
| 2011 | North America | 60–12 |
| 2012 | Tie | 36–36 |
| 2013 | North America | 11–7 |
| 2014 | North America | 12½–5½ |
| 2015 | Canada | 14–4 |
| 2016 | North America | 10–8 |
| 2017 | North America | 11–7 |
| 2018 | North America | 9½–8½ |
| 2019 | World | 5½–½ |
| 2020 | Europe | 5–1 |

=== Mixed doubles ===
Until 2020, the mixed doubles component consists of twelve games, with each player competing in one mixed doubles game. One point is awarded to the winner, with a half point if the game is tied after eight ends. In 2020, the number of games was reduced to 9, such that each player must play in one mixed doubles game and or one of the mixed scrambles.

Prior to 2007, each team consisted of two sweepers and two throwers, where one man and one woman was to play each position. By tradition, each men's rink was paired with a women's rink to make two teams for this event, with each mixed team being given as the names of the two throwers. All 24 players on each side were required to play in either a sweeping or throwing role in this format. Starting in 2007, however, sweepers were eliminated to create a true "doubles" game, and any sweeping is to be done by either the thrower or the skip. In the past, six points would have been given for a win, and three points would have been given for a tie.

The rules from this event (with the 2007 revision) were later adopted as a separate curling discipline with the inauguration of the World Mixed Doubles Curling Championship in 2008, and became an Olympic discipline ten years later.

==== Results ====
| Year | Mixed doubles winner | Points |
|---|---|---|
| 2002 | World | 24–12 |
| 2003 | North America | 24–12 |
| 2004 | North America | 21–15 |
| 2006 | North America | 24–12 |
| 2007 | North America | 27–9 |
| 2008 | World | 27–9 |
| 2011 | North America | 30–6 |
| 2012 | World | 30–6 |
| 2013 | North America | 4½–1½ |
| 2014 | North America | 4–2 |
| 2015 | Canada | 4½–1½ |
| 2016 | World | 7½–4½ |
| 2017 | North America | 8–4 |
| 2018 | Tie | 6–6 |
| 2019 | World | 8–4 |
| 2020 | Europe | 6½–2½ |

=== Team scramble ===
The team scramble competition was added to the Cup in 2019. The men's and women's teams are mixed up into same-gender lineups. No team may consist of a front-end or back-end from the same team. As of 2019, there are six games, each worth one point, with a half point if the game is tied after eight ends.

==== Results ====
| Year | Team scramble winner | Points |
|---|---|---|
| 2019 | World | 4–2 |
| 2020 | Europe | 4–2 |

=== Mixed team scramble ===
The mixed team scramble competition was also added to the 2019 event. In 2020, this consisted of two draws (of three games each) but scrambled with four players so that they none can play with their normal mixed teams. In one round, one team from each side is be skipped by a female player, and for the other round, the teams are skipped by a male player. One point is awarded to the winner, with a half-point if the game is tied after eight ends.

==== Results ====
| Year | Mixed team scramble winner | Points |
|---|---|---|
| 2019 | North America | 6–0 |
| 2020 | Europe | 5–1 |

=== Skins ===
The final event, and the event worth the most points, is the skins portion. As of the most recent cup, 33 points can be claimed in the combined skins draws, meaning that neither team can clinch the Continental Cup until the skins games are played. As of 2013, there were a total of five points, with half-point skins in the first six ends of the game and one-point skins in the final two ends. In 2020, this was modified so each skins game was worth six points, with a total of eighteen points available for the final draw. Prior to 2013, teams could claim 260 points in the skins games, and the points were distributed in an uneven manner through each of the eight ends, resulting in a different total point value for each skins game, but in 2019 this was changed to the current scoring system so that at least half of the points were up for grabs on the final day of play.

In order for a team to claim a skin, the team must either score at least two points with the hammer or force a steal without the hammer. In the skins competitions, blank ends will turn the hammer over to the opposing team. If after eight ends there remain points to be claimed, a draw to the button determines which team will get the points.

The points for the skins games were distributed as follows:

| Points per game | End | | | | | | | |
| Points per game | 1 | 2 | 3 | 4 | 5 | 6 | 7 | 8 |
|---|---|---|---|---|---|---|---|---|
| 6 points (2020–present*) | ½ | ½ | ½ | ½ | 1 | 1 | 1 | 1 |
| 5 points (2013–present*) | ½ | ½ | ½ | ½ | ½ | ½ | 1 | 1 |
| 20 points (2007–2012) | 1 | 1 | 2 | 2 | 2 | 2 | 4 | 6 |
| 30 points (2002–2006) | 2 | 2 | 3 | 3 | 3 | 4 | 6 | 7 |
| 30 points (2007–2012) | 1 | 1 | 3 | 3 | 3 | 4 | 6 | 9 |
| 40 points (2002–2006) | 2 | 2 | 4 | 4 | 5 | 6 | 7 | 10 |
| 55 points (2007–2012) | 4 | 4 | 5 | 6 | 6 | 8 | 10 | 12 |
| 60 points (2002–2006) | 4 | 4 | 6 | 6 | 7 | 9 | 11 | 13 |

From 2002 to 2007, there were six skins games, three men's and three women's, with the games worth 30, 40, and 60 points. The games were typically referred to as the "A", "B", and "C" games. From 2007 to 2012, eight skins games were played. Three were worth 20 points, three were worth 30 points and the remaining two were worth 55 points. Three men's skins games and three women's skins games were played, with the remaining "A" and "B" game featuring mixed teams. The teams playing in the featured games, also known as the "C" games, were required to contribute two players, one male and one female, to both mixed skins games, while the teams playing in the "A" skins game must contribute two players, one male and one female, to the "B" mixed skins game, and vice versa. The featured skins game was played on the last day of competition, while the others were played on the same day as the singles events. With the exception of the men's feature game in the 2003 cup, which was only played to seven ends with 13 points on the line in the eighth, all skins games are played to their conclusion, even if the Continental Cup has been clinched by one side partway through, or before all matches have been played (as was the case in 2007, when North America had clinched the Continental Cup before either of the feature skins game were played).

==== Results ====
| Year | Skins winner | Points | Men's feature game | Women's feature game |
|---|---|---|---|---|
| 2002 | North America | 139–121 | (Canada) Kevin Martin 43–17 (Sweden) Peja Lindholm | (Canada) Colleen Jones 41–19 (Sweden) Elisabet Gustafson |
| 2003 | Europe | 134–113 | (Canada) Randy Ferbey 30–17 (Sweden) Peja Lindholm | (Sweden) Anette Norberg 60–0 (Canada) Sherry Middaugh |
| 2004 | North America | 134–126 | (Canada) Randy Ferbey 47–13 (Sweden) Peja Lindholm | (Sweden) Anette Norberg 41–19 (Canada) Colleen Jones |
| 2006 | Europe | 163–97 | (Canada) Brad Gushue 43–17 (Scotland) David Murdoch | (Sweden) Anette Norberg 32–28 (Canada) Shannon Kleibrink |
| 2007 | North America | 199–61 | (Canada) Glenn Howard 47–8 (Scotland) David Murdoch | (Canada) Kelly Scott 33–22 (Scotland) Kelly Wood |
| 2008 | North America | 150–110 | (Canada) Kevin Martin 40–15 (Norway) Thomas Ulsrud | (Sweden) Anette Norberg 41–14 (Canada) Jennifer Jones |
| 2011 | North America | 186–64 | (Canada) Kevin Martin 39–16 (Norway) Thomas Ulsrud | (Canada) Cheryl Bernard 42–13 (China) Wang Bingyu |
| 2012 | World | 145–115 | (Norway) Thomas Ulsrud 35–20 (Canada) Jeff Stoughton | (China) Wang Bingyu 30–25 (Canada) Stefanie Lawton |
| 2013 | North America | 17½–12½ | (Canada) Glenn Howard 3–2 (Norway) Thomas Ulsrud | (Canada) Jennifer Jones 4–1 (Switzerland) Mirjam Ott |
| 2014 | North America | 18½–11½ | (Canada) Brad Jacobs 4–1 (Norway) Thomas Ulsrud | (United States) Erika Brown 3–2 (Scotland) Eve Muirhead |
| 2015 | Canada | 20–10 | (Canada) Brad Jacobs 4–1 (Scotland) David Murdoch | (Canada) Jennifer Jones 2½–2½ (Scotland) Eve Muirhead |
| 2016 | North America | 16–14 | (Sweden) Niklas Edin 4–1 (Canada) Kevin Koe | (Canada) Jennifer Jones 4–1 (Scotland) Eve Muirhead |
| 2017 | North America | 18–12 | (Canada) Reid Carruthers 3½–1½ (Sweden) Niklas Edin | (Sweden) Anna Hasselborg 3–2 (Canada) Jennifer Jones |
| 2018 | World | 15½–14½ | (Norway) Thomas Ulsrud 3–2 (Canada) Brad Gushue | (Switzerland) Silvana Tirinzoni 3–2 (Canada) Rachel Homan |
| 2019 | World | 16½–13½ | (Canada) Kevin Koe 3½–1½ (Scotland) Bruce Mouat | (Canada) Rachel Homan 2½–2½ (Scotland) Eve Muirhead |
| 2020 | Europe | 17–16 | (Switzerland) Peter de Cruz 4–2 (Canada) Brendan Bottcher | (Canada) Rachel Homan 4–2 (Scotland) Eve Muirhead |

=== Singles ===
The singles competition is akin to a skills competition. There are six singles matches (three women's and three men's), with one point given to the winner of each match. In the past, four points would be given to the winner of each match, and eight bonus points would be awarded to the team with the higher aggregate score for the singles events. By convention, each of the matches pit teams against each other. Prior to 2007, one team member was to throw all six shots, while the non-throwers must sweep or skip for the thrower. Beginning in 2007, however, each member of the team must make at least one shot, and no member may make more than two shots. The singles event was discontinued in 2016.

Each singles match is determined based on a points system (with 0 for missing the shot entirely, 1 if the shot remains in play but outside the house, and higher points based on where the shooter eventually lands, up to a maximum of 5 points if the shooter reaches the button), and the team with the higher score wins the game. Three of the shots must be in-turns, while the other three must be out-turns, with the shots set up according to their chosen type of turn. The six shots are as follows:

- the runthrough — the shooter must hit their own center guard, which then must hit an opposing rock at the back of the button. The position of the hit guard determines the point value of the shot.
- the draw to the button - a simple draw to the button.
- the draw through a port - the shooter must draw their rock between two opposing rocks (a corner guard and a center guard on the opposite side of the center line). Points are only awarded if the thrown rock passes through the two opposing rocks without hitting either rock.
- the raise - the shooter must hit their own centre guard so that the guard is raised into the house. The position of the raised guard determines the point value of the shot.
- the hit-and-roll - the shooter must hit an opposing stone on a corner guard outside the house and then roll towards the center of the house. The hit stone must be completely removed from play in order to score points.
- the double takeout - the shooter must remove two opposing stones, one at the top of the four-foot and one at the back of the button. Both stones must be completely removed from play in order to score points. The position of the shooter determines the point value of the shot.

To determine the singles matchups, one team captain must choose one rink while the other captain chooses the rink opposing them. One captain will choose first for the first women's matchup and the second men's matchup, while the other captain chooses first for the first men's matchup and the second women's matchup. All women's games are completed before the men's games, and all shots of one type must be completed before the next shot is done. The team throwing first in one shot (which will be the same team in all three matches) will throw second in the next shot. The right to make the first shot in the runthrough alternates between the two teams every year.

==== Results ====
| Year | Team winner | Points | Top men's team (points) | Top women's team (points) |
|---|---|---|---|---|
| 2002 | Europe | 24–8 | (Canada) Kevin Martin (27) | (Sweden) Katarina Nyberg (24) |
| 2003 | Europe | 20–12 | (Sweden) Magnus Swartling (22) | (Norway) Marianne Haslum (15) |
| 2004 | North America | 28–4 | (Canada) Randy Ferbey (21) | (United States) Patti Lank (20) |
| 2006 | Europe | 18–14 | (Norway) Flemming Davanger (22) (Finland) Markku Uusipaavalniemi (22) | (Canada) Kelly Scott (22) |
| 2007 | North America | 28–4 | (Canada) Team Glenn Howard (26) | (Canada) Team Jennifer Jones (26) |
| 2008 | World | 22–10 | (China) Team Wang Fengchun (20) | (China) Team Wang Bingyu (18) |
| 2011 | North America | 22–10 | (Canada) Team Kevin Martin (27) | (Canada) Team Jennifer Jones (16) (Switzerland) Team Mirjam Ott (16) |
| 2012 | World | 24–8 | (Canada) Team Jeff Stoughton (25) | (China) Team Wang Bingyu (21) |
| 2013 | North America | 4-2 | (Canada) Team Glenn Howard (22) | (United States) Team Allison Pottinger (18) (Switzerland) Team Mirjam Ott (18) |
| 2014 | World | 5–1 | (Norway) Team Thomas Ulsrud (18) | (Sweden) Team Margaretha Sigfridsson (24) |
| 2015 | Canada | 3½–2½ | (Norway) Team Thomas Ulsrud (23) | (Canada) Team Rachel Homan (20) (Canada) Team Jennifer Jones (20) |

== Similar events in other sports ==
- Ryder Cup — Men's golf
- Solheim Cup — Women's golf
- Mosconi Cup — Nine-ball pool
- Weber Cup — Ten-pin bowling
- IAAF World Cup — Athletics
- NFL Global Junior Championship — American Football, includes a Team Europe
