= Niclas Järund =

Swedish and Norwegian male curler

- Curler ♂
- Born: 14 January 1962 (age 64)

Team
- Curling club: (Sweden) Karlstads CK

Curling career
- Member Association: Sweden; Norway
- World Championship: 3 (1982, 1990, 1991)
- European Championship: 5 (1990, 1992, 1993, 1996, 1998)
Medal record
Curling
World Championships
Bronze medal – third place	1991 Winnipeg
European Championships
Gold medal – first place	1993 Leukerbad
Bronze medal – third place	1990 Lillehammer
Bronze medal – third place	1998 Flims

Niclas Järund (Swedish: Niklas Järund, born 14 January 1962) is a former Swedish and Norwegian (after 1988) curler and curling coach.

He is a 1993 European champion.

== Teams ==
Season	Skip	Third	Second	Lead	Alternate	Coach	Events
1981–82	Sören Grahn	Niclas Järund	Henrik Holmberg	Anders Svennerstedt			SJCC 1982 (gold); WJCC 1982 (gold)
1981–82	Sören Grahn	Connie Östlund	Niclas Järund	Tony Eng			WCC 1982 (4th)
1982–83	Sören Grahn	Niclas Järund	Henrik Holmberg	Anders Svennerstedt			SJCC 1983 (gold); WJCC 1983 (7th)
1989–90	Eigil Ramsfjell	Sjur Loen	Niclas Järund	Morten Skaug	Flemming Davanger		WCC 1990 (5th)
1990–91	Eigil Ramsfjell	Sjur Loen	Niclas Järund	Morten Skaug	Dagfinn Loen		WCC 1991 (bronze)
1992–93	Eigil Ramsfjell	Sjur Loen	Niclas Järund	Bent Ånund Ramsfjell			ECC 1992 (9th)
1993–94	Eigil Ramsfjell	Sjur Loen	Dagfinn Loen	Niclas Järund	Espen de Lange	Thoralf Hognestad	ECC 1993 (gold)
1996–97	Tormod Andreassen	Stig-Arne Gunnestad	Niclas Järund	Kjell Berg	Flemming Davanger		ECC 1996 (6th)
1998–99	Tormod Andreassen	Niclas Järund	Stig-Arne Gunnestad	Kjell Berg	Stig Høiberg		ECC 1998 (bronze)
2004–05	Tormod Andreassen	Hans Nyman	Niclas Järund	Erik Salen			

== Record as a coach of national teams ==
Year	Tournament, event	National team	Place
1994	1994 European Curling Championships	Norway (women)	3rd place, bronze medalist(s)
