= 1981 World Junior Curling Championships =

- Host city: Megève, France
- Dates: March 7–14
- Men's winner: Scotland (2nd title)
- Skip: Peter Wilson
- Third: Jim Cannon
- Second: Roger McIntyre
- Lead: John Parker
- Finalist: Canada (Denis Marchand)

The 1981 World Junior Curling Championships were held from March 7 to 14 in Megève, France for men's teams only.

== Teams ==
Country	Skip	Third	Second	Lead	Curling club
Canada	Denis Marchand	Denis Cecil	Larry Phillips	Yves Barrette	
Denmark	Jack Kjaerulf	Lasse Lavrsen	Kim Dupont	Henrik Jakobsen	Hvidovre CC
France	Christophe Boan	Dominique Dupont-Roc	Philippe Pomi	Christophe Michaud	
West Germany	Christoph Möckel	Uwe Saile	Michael Neumaier	Harald Zinsmeister	CC Schwenningen
Italy	Dennis Ghezze	Fabio Mitterhofer	Alessandro Lanaro	Stefano Sartori	Cortina CC, Cortina d'Ampezzo
Norway	Pål Trulsen	Flemming Davanger	Stig-Arne Gunnestad	Kjell Berg	Risenga CK, Oslo
Scotland	Peter Wilson	Jim Cannon	Roger McIntyre	John Parker	
Sweden	Thomas Norgren	Peter Svedlund	Conny Ekholm	Erik Pettersson	CK Skvadern, Sundsvall
Switzerland	Rico Simen	Thomas Kläy	Jürg Dick	Mario Gross	
United States	Ted Purvis	Dale Risling	Milton Jr Best	Dean Risling	

== Round robin ==
Place	Team	1	2	3	4	5	6	7	8	9	10	Wins	Losses
1	Canada	*	8:7	10:2	6:5	8:3	10:2	6:7	4:3	7:3	9:5	8	1
2	United States	7:8	*	8:2	11:2	9:5	8:3	7:6	4:7	4:6	8:3	6	3
3	Scotland	2:10	2:8	*	7:6	7:6	5:8	5:6	11:2	5:4	11:4	5	4
4	Sweden	5:6	2:11	6:7	*	9:10	5:3	8:5	9:5	7:3	17:4	5	4
4	West Germany	3:8	5:9	6:7	10:9	*	9:5	7:6	7:4	5:10	11:3	5	4
6	Denmark	2:10	3:8	8:5	3:5	5:9	*	7:6	2:8	7:6	8:4	4	5
6	Norway	7:6	6:7	6:5	5:8	6:7	6:7	*	7:6	8:3	2:10	4	5
6	Switzerland	3:4	7:4	2:11	5:9	4:7	8:2	6:7	*	12:5	9:5	4	5
9	France	3:7	6:4	4:5	3:7	10:5	6:7	3:8	5:12	*	6:5	3	6
10	Italy	5:9	3:8	4:11	4:17	3:11	4:8	10:2	5:9	5:6	*	1	8

Teams to playoffs
Teams to tiebreaker

=== Tiebreaker ===
Team	Final
Sweden	7
West Germany	6

== Playoffs ==
Semifinal
1	Canada	8
4	Sweden	5
2	United States	5
3	Scotland	7

Gold Medal Game
1	Canada	5
3	Scotland	8
Bronze medal game
4	Sweden	3
2	United States	5

== Final standings ==
Place	Team	Games played	Wins	Losses
1st place, gold medalist(s)	Scotland	11	7	4
2nd place, silver medalist(s)	Canada	11	9	2
3rd place, bronze medalist(s)	United States	11	7	4
4	Sweden	12	6	6
5	West Germany	10	5	5
6	Denmark	9	4	5
6	Norway	9	4	5
6	Switzerland	9	4	5
9	France	9	3	6
10	Italy	9	1	8

== Awards ==
- WJCC Sportsmanship Award: (Scotland) Peter Wilson

All-Star Team:

- Skip: (Canada) Denis Marchand
- Third: (United States) Dale Risling
- Second: (Canada) Larry Phillips
- Lead: (Sweden) Erik Pettersson
