= 2003 Continental Cup of Curling =

- Host city: Thunder Bay, Ontario
- Arena: Fort William Gardens
- Dates: November 27–30
- Winner: Team Europe
Score Breakdown
Discipline	NA	Europe
Mixed Doubles	24	12
Women's Team	12	24
Men's Team	18	18
Singles	12	20
Women's Skins	46	84
Men's Skins	67	50
Total	179	208

The 2003 Continental Cup of Curling was held at Fort William Gardens in Thunder Bay, Ontario November 27–30. Europe won its first title, 208-179, earning $125,000 for their team.

== Teams ==
=== Europe ===
- (Sweden) Peja Lindholm, Tomas Nordin, Magnus Swartling, Peter Narup
- (Scotland) Jackie Lockhart, Sheila Swan, Katriona Fairweather, Anne Laird
- (Scotland) Hammy McMillan, Norman Brown, Hugh Aitken, Roger McIntyre
- (Sweden) Anette Norberg, Eva Lund, Cathrine Lindahl, Helena Lingham
- (Norway) Dordi Nordby, Hanne Woods, Marianne Haslum, Camilla Holth
- (Norway) Pål Trulsen, Lars Vågberg, Flemming Davanger, Bent Ånund Ramsfjell

=== North America ===
- (Canada) Mark Dacey, Bruce Lohnes, Rob Harris, Andrew Gibson
- (Canada) David Nedohin, Randy Ferbey, Scott Pfeifer, Marcel Rocque
- (United States) Pete Fenson, Eric Fenson, Shawn Rojeski, John Shuster
- (Canada) Colleen Jones, Kim Kelly, Mary-Anne Arsenault, Nancy Delahunt
- (United States) Debbie McCormick, Allison Pottinger, Ann Swisshelm Silver, Tracy Sachtjen
- (Canada) Sherry Middaugh, Kirsten Wall, Andrea Lawes, Sheri Cordina

== Mixed doubles ==
(Each game worth six points)

- North America (Ferbey/Wall) 8-6 Europe (Nordby/Vågberg)
- North America (Jones/Lohnes) 11-4 Europe (McMillan/Swan)
- North America (Dacey/Kelly) 9-8 Europe (Nordin/Norberg)
- Europe (Lockhart/Brown) 7-4 North America (P. Fenson/Pottinger)
- North America (Nedohin/Middaugh) 9-3 Europe (Lindholm/Lund)
- Europe (Trulsen/Woods) 8-6 (McCormick/E. Fenson)

North America wins 24-12

== Women's team ==
(Each game worth six points)

- Europe (Lockhart) 5-4 North America (Jones)
- North America (Middaugh) 5-4 Europe (Nordby)
- Europe (Norberg) 6-2 North America (McCormick)
- Europe (Norberg) 6-5 North America (Middaugh)
- North America (McCormick) 10-7 Europe (Nordby)
- Europe (Lockhart) 5-3 North America (Jones)

Europe wins 24-12

== Men's team ==
(Each game worth six points)

- North America (Fenson) 6-3 Europe (Trulsen)
- North America (Ferbey) 5-3 Europe (McMillan)
- Europe (Lindholm) 7-2 North America (Dacey)
- Europe (Lindholm) 5-3 North America (Ferbey)
- North America (Dacey) 5-3 Europe (McMillan)
- Europe (Trulsen) 10-1 North America (Fenson)

Tie 18-18

== Singles ==
(Each game worth four points, eight bonus points awarded to top aggregate score)

- North America (Wall) 14-13 Europe (Norberg)
- Europe (Haslum) 15-7 North America (Jones)
- North America (McCormick) 14-12 Europe (Lockhart)
- Europe (Swartling) 22-19 North America (Pfeifer)
- North America (P. Fenson) 17-15 Europe (Davanger)
- Europe (McMillan) 19-17 North America (Dacey)

Europe wins 20-12

== Women's skins ==
(Each skin is worth one point)

- North America (McCormick) 23-7 Europe (Nordby)
- North America (Jones) 23-17 Europe (Lockhart)
- Europe (Norberg) 60-0 North America (Middaugh)

Europe wins 84-46

== Men's skins ==
(Each skin is worth one point)

- Europe (McMillan) 16-14 North America (Fenson)
- North America (Dacey) 23-17 Europe (Trulsen)
- North America (Ferbey) 30-17 Europe (Lindhom) (game not completed)

North America wins 67-50

Europe wins aggregate 208-179
