= Curling at the 1992 Winter Olympics =

Curling at the XVI Olympic Winter Games

Men's curling at the XVI Olympic Winter Games

Medalists
| 1st place, gold medalist(s) | | Switzerland |
| 2nd place, silver medalist(s) | | Norway |
| 3rd place, bronze medalist(s) | | United States |

Women's curling at the XVI Olympic Winter Games

Medalists
| 1st place, gold medalist(s) | | Germany |
| 2nd place, silver medalist(s) | | Norway |
| 3rd place, bronze medalist(s) | | Canada |

Curling was a demonstration sport at the 1992 Winter Olympics. The competition was held in the patinoire olympique of Pralognan-la-Vanoise, a venue about 50 km from the host city, Albertville. The 1992 Winter Games was the third time curling was a demonstration sport at the Winter Olympics.

== Medal summary ==
=== Medal table ===
| Rank | Nation | Gold | Silver | Bronze | Total |
|---|---|---|---|---|---|
| 1 | Germany | 1 | 0 | 0 | 1 |
| 1 | Switzerland | 1 | 0 | 0 | 1 |
| 3 | Norway | 0 | 2 | 0 | 2 |
| 4 | Canada | 0 | 0 | 1 | 1 |
| 4 | United States | 0 | 0 | 1 | 1 |
| Totals (5 entries) | | 2 | 2 | 2 | 6 |

=== Events ===
| Games | Gold | Silver | Bronze |
|---|---|---|---|
| Men's | Switzerland; Urs Dick; Jürgen Dick; Robert Hürlimann; Thomas Kläy; Peter Däppen | Norway; Tormod Andreassen; Stig-Arne Gunnestad; Flemming Davanger; Kjell Berg; Pål Trulsen | United States; Bud Somerville; Tim Somerville; Mike Strum; Bill Strum; Bob Nichols |
| Women's | Germany; Andrea Schöpp; Stephanie Mayr; Monika Wagner; Sabine Huth; Christiane Scheibel | Norway; Dordi Nordby; Hanne Pettersen; Mette Halvorsen; Anne Jøtun; Marianne Aspelin | Canada; Julie Sutton; Jodie Sutton; Melissa Soligo; Karri Willms; Elaine Dagg-Jackson |

== Men ==
The men's competition had eight countries in two groups.

=== Teams ===
| Australia | Canada | France | Great Britain |
|---|---|---|---|
| Melbourne CC, Melbourne Skip: Hugh Millikin; Third: Thomas Kidd; Second: Daniel Joyce; Lead: Stephen Hewitt; Alternate: Brian Stuart | Avonair CC, Edmonton Skip: Kevin Martin; Third: Kevin Park; Second: Dan Petryk; Lead: Don Bartlett; Alternate: Jules Owchar | Megève CC, Megève Skip: Dominique Dupont-Roc; Third: Claude Feige; Second: Patrick Philippe; Lead: Thierry Mercier; Alternate: Daniel Moratelli | Castle Kennedy CC, Stranraer Skip: Hammy McMillan; Third: Norman Brown; Second: Gordon Muirhead; Lead: Roger McIntyre; Alternate: Robert Kelly |
| Norway | Sweden | Switzerland | United States |
| Risenga CK, Oslo Skip: Tormod Andreassen; Third: Stig-Arne Gunnestad; Second: Flemming Davanger; Lead: Kjell Berg; Alternate: Pål Trulsen | Karlstads CK, Karlstad Skip: Dan-Ola Eriksson; Third: Sören Grahn; Second: Jonas Sjölander; Lead: Stefan Holmén; Alternate: Håkan Funk | CC Lausanne-Olympique, Lausanne Skip: Urs Dick; Third: Jürg Dick; Second: Robert Hürlimann; Lead: Thomas Kläy; Alternate: Peter Däppen | Superior CC, Superior Fourth: Tim Somerville; Third: Mike Strum; Skip: Bud Somerville; Lead: Bill Strum; Alternate: Bob Nichols |

=== Round robin ===
==== Pool A ====
===== Standings =====
| Country | Skip | W | L |
|---|---|---|---|
| Norway | Tormod Andreassen | 3 | 0 |
| Switzerland | Urs Dick | 2 | 1 |
| Great Britain | Hammy McMillan | 1 | 2 |
| Australia | Hugh Millikin | 0 | 3 |

===== Results =====
| Team | Final |
| Norway (Andreassen) | 11 |
| Switzerland (Dick) | 3 |

| Team | Final |
| Great Britain (McMillan) | 9 |
| Australia (Millikin) | 6 |

| Team | Final |
| Switzerland (Dick) | 7 |
| Australia (Millikin) | 3 |

| Team | Final |
| Norway (Andreassen) | 6 |
| Great Britain (McMillan) | 1 |

| Team | Final |
| Norway (Andreassen) | 11 |
| Australia (Millikin) | 1 |

| Team | Final |
| Switzerland (Dick) | 6 |
| Great Britain (McMillan) | 5 |

==== Pool B ====
===== Standings =====
| Country | Skip | W | L |
|---|---|---|---|
| Canada | Kevin Martin | 3 | 0 |
| United States | Bud Somerville | 2 | 1 |
| France | Dominique Dupont-Roc | 1 | 2 |
| Sweden | Dan-Ola Eriksson | 0 | 3 |

===== Results =====
| Team | Final |
| Canada (Martin) | 7 |
| United States (Somerville) | 3 |

| Team | Final |
| France (Dupont-Roc) | 8 |
| Sweden (Eriksson) | 3 |

| Team | Final |
| United States (Somerville) | 8 |
| Sweden (Eriksson) | 4 |

| Team | Final |
| Canada (Martin) | 5 |
| France (Dupont-Roc) | 4 |

| Team | Final |
| Canada (Martin) | 10 |
| Sweden (Eriksson) | 5 |

| Team | Final |
| United States (Somerville) | 6 |
| France (Dupont-Roc) | 4 |

=== Ranking games ===
==== 5th/6th place ====
| Team | Final |
| Great Britain (McMillan) | 6 |
| France (Dupont-Roc) | 4 |

==== 7th/8th place ====
| Team | Final |
| Australia (Millikin) | 8 |
| Sweden (Eriksson) | 6 |

=== Playoffs ===
==== Semi-finals ====
| Team | Final |
| Canada (Martin) | 4 |
| Switzerland (Dick) | 8 |

| Team | Final |
| Norway (Andreassen) | 8 |
| United States (Somerville) | 3 |

==== Bronze medal game ====
| Team | Final |
| Canada (Martin) | 2 |
| United States (Somerville) | 9 |

==== Gold medal game ====
| Sheet | 1 | 2 | 3 | 4 | 5 | 6 | 7 | 8 | 9 | 10 | 11 | Final |
|---|---|---|---|---|---|---|---|---|---|---|---|---|
| Switzerland (Dick) | 0 | 2 | 0 | 1 | 0 | 1 | 1 | 0 | 0 | 1 | 1 | 7 |
| Norway (Andreassen) | 1 | 0 | 2 | 0 | 1 | 0 | 0 | 1 | 1 | 0 | 0 | 6 |

Player percentages
| Switzerland | | Norway | |
|---|---|---|---|
| Thomas Kläy | 76% | Kjell Berg | 86% |
| Robert Hürlimann | 82% | Stig-Arne Gunnestad | 85% |
| Jürg Dick | 81% | Flemming Davanger | 77% |
| Urs Dick | 77% | Tormod Andreassen | 73% |
| Total | 79% | Total | 80% |

== Women ==
The women's curling event at the 1992 Winter Olympics had eight countries in two groups.

=== Teams ===
| Canada | Denmark | France | Germany |
|---|---|---|---|
| Juan de Fuca CC, Victoria Skip: Julie Sutton; Third: Jodie Sutton; Second: Melissa Soligo; Lead: Karri Willms; Alternate: Elaine Dagg-Jackson | Hvidovre CC, Hvidovre Skip: Helena Blach; Third: Malene Krause; Second: Lene Bidstrup; Lead: Susanne Slotsager; Alternate: Dorthe Holm | Megève CC, Megève Skip: Annick Mercier; Third: Brigitte Lamy; Second: Géraldine Girod; Lead: Claire Niatel; Alternate: Brigitte Collard | SC Riessersee, Garmisch-Partenkirchen Skip: Andrea Schöpp; Third: Stephanie Mayr; Second: Monika Wagner; Lead: Sabine Huth; Alternate: Christiane Scheibel |
| Great Britain | Japan | Norway | Sweden |
| Laurencekirk CC, Aberdeen Skip: Jackie Lockhart; Third: Deborah Knox; Second: Judith Stobbie; Lead: Wendy Bell; Alternate: Isobel Torrance Jr. | Obihiro CC, Hokkaido Skip: Mayumi Seguchi; Third: Midori Kudoh; Second: Mayumi Abe; Lead: Utage Matsuzaki; Alternate: Rumi Michita | Snarøen CC, Oslo Skip: Dordi Nordby; Third: Hanne Pettersen; Second: Mette Halvorsen; Lead: Anne Jøtun; Alternate: Marianne Aspelin | Härnösands CK, Härnösands Skip: Anette Norberg; Third: Anna Rindeskog; Second: Cathrine Norberg; Lead: Helene Granqvist; Alternate: Ann-Catrin Kjerr |

=== Round robin ===
==== Pool A ====
===== Standings =====
| Country | Skip | W | L |
|---|---|---|---|
| Germany | Andrea Schöpp | 2 | 1 |
| Norway | Dordi Nordby | 2 | 1 |
| Great Britain | Jackie Lockhart | 2 | 1 |
| Japan | Mayumi Seguchi | 0 | 3 |

===== Results =====
| Team | Final |
| Norway (Nordby) | 3 |
| Germany (Schöpp) | 7 |

| Team | Final |
| Great Britain (Lockhart) | 10 |
| Japan (Seguchi) | 3 |

| Team | Final |
| Germany (Schöpp) | 9 |
| Japan (Seguchi) | 7 |

| Team | Final |
| Norway (Nordby) | 5 |
| Great Britain (Lockhart) | 4 |

| Team | Final |
| Germany (Schöpp) | 4 |
| Great Britain (Lockhart) | 6 |

| Team | Final |
| Norway (Nordby) | 7 |
| Japan (Seguchi) | 6 |

===== Tie-breakers =====
| Team | Final |
| Germany (Schöpp) | 5 |
| Great Britain (Lockhart) | 4 |

| Team | Final |
| Norway (Nordby) | 9 |
| Great Britain (Lockhart) | 4 |

==== Pool B ====
===== Standings =====
| Country | Skip | W | L |
|---|---|---|---|
| Canada | Julie Sutton | 3 | 0 |
| Denmark | Helena Blach | 2 | 1 |
| Sweden | Anette Norberg | 1 | 2 |
| France | Annick Mercier | 0 | 3 |

===== Results =====
| Team | Final |
| Canada (Sutton) | 12 |
| Denmark (Blach) | 2 |

| Team | Final |
| Sweden (Norberg) | 14 |
| France (Mercier) | 5 |

| Team | Final |
| Denmark (Blach) | 8 |
| Sweden (Norberg) | 6 |

| Team | Final |
| Canada (Sutton) | 4 |
| France (Mercier) | 3 |

| Team | Final |
| Canada (Sutton) | 8 |
| Sweden (Norberg) | 2 |

| Team | Final |
| France (Mercier) | 5 |
| Denmark (Blach) | 9 |

=== Ranking games ===
==== 5th/6th place ====
| Team | Final |
| Sweden (Norberg) | 11 |
| Great Britain (Lockhart) | 7 |

==== 7th/8th place ====
| Team | Final |
| France (Mercier) | 9 |
| Japan (Seguchi) | 6 |

=== Playoffs ===
Semifinals
B2 | Denmark | 5
A1 | Germany | 6
A2 | Norway | 9
B1 | Canada | 2

Gold Medal Game
A1 | Germany | 9
A2 | Norway | 2
Bronze Medal Game
B2 | Denmark | 3
B1 | Canada | 9

==== Semifinals ====
| Team | Final |
| Denmark (Blach) | 5 |
| Germany (Schöpp) | 6 |

| Team | Final |
| Norway (Nordby) | 9 |
| Canada (Sutton) | 2 |

==== Bronze medal game ====
| Team | Final |
| Denmark (Blach) | 3 |
| Canada (Sutton) | 9 |

==== Gold medal game ====
| Sheet | 1 | 2 | 3 | 4 | 5 | 6 | 7 | 8 | 9 | 10 | Final |
|---|---|---|---|---|---|---|---|---|---|---|---|
| Germany (Schöpp) | 0 | 2 | 0 | 0 | 0 | 0 | 3 | 4 | X | X | 9 |
| Norway (Nordby) | 0 | 0 | 0 | 1 | 1 | 0 | 0 | 0 | X | X | 2 |

Player percentages
| Norway | | Germany | |
|---|---|---|---|
| Anne Jotun | 86% | Sabine Huth | 64% |
| Mette Halvorsen | 74% | Monika Wagner | 88% |
| Hanne Pettersen | 50% | Stephanie Mayr | 66% |
| Dordi Nordby | 67% | Andrea Schöpp | 88% |
| Total | 69% | Total | 77% |
