= Jim Cannon (curler) =

Scottish curler

- Curler ♂

Curling career
- Member Association: Scotland
- European Championship: 1 (1989)
- Other appearances: World Junior Championships: 1 (1981)
Medal record
Curling
European Championships
| Gold medal – first place | 1989 Engelberg |

Jim Cannon is a Scottish curler. He is a 1989 European champion.

His wife is fellow Scottish curler Christine Cannon.

== Teams ==
| Season | Skip | Third | Second | Lead | Events |
|---|---|---|---|---|---|
| 1980–81 | Peter Wilson | Jim Cannon | Roger McIntyre | John Parker | SJCC 1981 (gold); WJCC 1981 (gold) |
| 1989–90 | Hammy McMillan | Norman Brown | Hugh Aitken | Jim Cannon | ECC 1989 (gold) |
