= Venues of the 1992 Winter Olympics =

For the 1992 Winter Olympics in Albertville, France, a total of thirteen sports venues were used. Val-d'Isère has been part of the Alpine Skiing World Cup since the late 1960s while Tignes served as host of the first Freestyle World Ski Championships in 1986. Most of the venues used were constructed between 1987 and mid 1990 with the test events taking place in late 1990 and early 1991. It was the last Winter Olympics with an outdoor speed skating rink which led to weather issues for three of the ten events. Three cross-country skiing events were run in snowstorms while the men's 20 km biathlon was found to be 0.563 km (0.350 mi) too short. The downhill events in alpine skiing were criticized for being too steep. Freestyle skiing made its official debut at these games with the men's winner being stormed after his win while the women's winner won her event in a snow storm. La Plagne hosted the skeleton World Championships in 1993 while Val-d'Isère hosted the Alpine World Ski Championships in 2009. Some of the venues will be used again during the 2030 Winter Olympics, when the main host city will be Lyon.

== Venues ==
Venue	Sports	Capacity	Ref.
L'anneau de vitesse	Speed skating	10,000	
La halle de glace Olympique	Figure skating, Short track speed skating	9,000	
La Plagne	Bobsleigh, Luge	Not listed.	
Les Arcs	Speed skiing (demonstration)	Not listed.	
Les Menuires	Alpine skiing (men's slalom)	Not listed.	
Les Saisies	Biathlon, Cross-country skiing	12,500	
Méribel	Alpine skiing (women)	3,000	
Méribel Ice Palace	Ice hockey	6,420	
Patinoire olympique de Pralognan-la-Vanoise	Curling (demonstration)	2,300	
Théâtre des Cérémonies	Ceremonies (opening/ closing)	35,000	
Tignes	Freestyle skiing	Not listed.	
Tremplin du Praz	Nordic combined, Ski jumping	20,000 (jumping); 15,000 (Nordic combined - cross-country skiing)	
Val-d'Isère	Alpine skiing (men's downhill, super-giant slalom, giant slalom, and combined)	Not listed.	

== Before the Olympics ==
Albertville is part of the Rhône-Alpes region in France that had hosted the Winter Olympics twice with Chamonix in 1924 and Grenoble in 1968. Jean-Claude Killy, the triple gold medalist in the men's alpine skiing event at the 1968 Grenoble Games, had become a successful businessman when he suggested the idea of the 1992 Winter Olympics in December 1981 to Michel Barnier, a politician in the Savoie department. A proposal was sent to the Albertville town council six months later, followed regional studies done during 1983–5. Presentation and media operations for the bid took place from 1983 to its awarding in 1986 by the International Olympic Committee. After five rounds of voting, Albertville was selected 51-25-9 over Sofia, Bulgaria & Falun, Sweden.

Val-d'Isère had its first alpine skiing World Cup events run in December 1968. The Olympic test held there in December 1990 was won by 1980 Winter Olympics men's downhill gold medalist Leonhard Stock of Austria.

Tignes hosted of the first FIS Freestyle World Ski Championships in February 1986.

Construction on most of the venues took place between 1987 and mid 1990 in time for the late 1990 and early 1991 test events.

== During the Olympics ==
This was the last Winter Olympics in which speed skating was held outdoors. As a result, weather played a factor in three of the ten events run. In the women's 500 m on 10 February, the start of the event was delayed one hour the let the outdoor oval ice harden. Warm weather delayed the women's 1,500 m event for an hour on the 12th. The following day, the men's 5,000 m event was held in a steady rain. Norway's Geir Karlstad, the gold medalist in the men's 5000 m, commented in the post race press conference that "I didn't like soft ice up to now, but now I do". This led to the International Skating Union passing a rule after the 1992 Winter Games stating that all Olympic speed skating competitions should be held indoors which it has been since the 1994 Winter Olympics in Lillehammer.

For the alpine skiing downhill courses, complaints were given that the courses were too steep. On the men's side, the complaints from downhill skiers that it was more like a super giant slalom course rather than a classical downhill course. The women's course was 2.77 km (1.72 mi) long and had the steepest vertical drop ever at 828 m (2,717 ft). Further making the women's downhill a challenge was an impending snowstorm that forced race officials to move up the start time and send the skiers out at shorter-than-usual intervals. An intermittent fog also set in during the women's downhill.

Cross-country skiing had snowstorm in the men's 10 km, men's 10 km + 15 km combined pursuit, and women's 5 km events. Meanwhile, the course of the biathlon men's 20 km individual event was found to be 0.563 km (0.350 mi) too short.

The men's freestyle skiing event had France's Edgar Grospiron as its winner. Grospiron's fan broke through the security fence that lined the course to embrace the champion and hoist Grospiron on their shoulders. Meanwhile, the women's event was won by Donna Weinbrecht of the United States while skiing to an accompaniment of The Ramones' "Rock 'n' Roll High School" in a snowstorm.

== After the Olympics ==
La Plagne hosted the skeleton part of the FIBT World Championships in 1993. The venue was part of Annecy's unsuccessful bid for the 2018 Winter Olympics in July 2011. If selected, La Plagne would have hosted the bobsleigh, luge, and skeleton events.

Val-d'Isère hosted the FIS Alpine World Ski Championships in 2009. The venue continues to host be a host of the annual FIS Alpine Ski World Cup.

The speed skating venue was converted into an athletics and football venue after the Olympics. Halle de Glace Olympique is since 1992 in use and the Théâtre des Cérémonies was dismantled following the Games, and its various parts were scattered around the world.Some venues will be used again during the 2030 Winter Olympics as part of a regional project.
