= 1980 World Junior Curling Championships =

- Host city: Kitchener, Ontario, Canada
- Arena: Kitchener Memorial Auditorium
- Dates: March 10–15
- Men's winner: Scotland (1st title)
- Skip: Andrew McQuistin
- Third: Norman Brown
- Second: Hugh Aitken
- Lead: Dick Adams
- Finalist: Canada (Mert Thompsett)

The 1980 World Junior Curling Championships were held from March 10 to 15 at the Kitchener Memorial Auditorium in Kitchener, Ontario, Canada. The tournament only had a men's event.

== Teams ==
Country	Skip	Third	Second	Lead	Curling club
Canada	Mert Thompsett	Lyle Derry	Joel Gagne	Mike Friesen	
Denmark	Jack Kjaerulf	Lasse Lavrsen	Kim Dupont	Henrik Jakobsen	Hvidovre CC
France	Yves Tronc	Christophe Boan	Gerard Ravello	André Jouvent	
West Germany	Christoph Möckel	Kai Meidele	Stephan Koch	Hagen Waegerle	
Italy	Adriano Lorenzi	Enrico Fumagalli	Alessandro Dal Fabbro	Roberto De Rigo	
Norway	Pål Trulsen	Flemming Davanger	Stig-Arne Gunnestad	Kjell Berg	Risenga CK, Oslo
Scotland	Andrew McQuistin	Norman Brown	Hugh Aitken	Dick Adams	
Sweden	Thomas Norgren	Peter Svedlund	Conny Ekholm	Erik Pettersson	CK Skvadern, Sundsvall
Switzerland	Rico Simen	Thomas Kläy	Jürg Dick	Urs Dick	
United States	Scott Dalziel	Todd Dalziel	Scott Gerrard	Paul Thompson	

== Round robin ==
Place	Team	1	2	3	4	5	6	7	8	9	10	Wins	Losses
1	Canada	*	4:2	7:4	6:7	15:2	9:3	7:4	W	7:6	7:3	8	1
2	Scotland	2:4	*	7:6	5:4	8:5	7:5	W	9:4	10:2	6:2	8	1
3	United States	4:7	6:7	*	7:6	W	6:3	7:4	7:5	5:6	10:5	6	3
4	Sweden	7:6	4:5	6:7	*	5:3	6:4	6:7	5:3	5:2	10:1	6	3
5	West Germany	2:15	5:8	L	3:5	*	8:5	5:4	3:7	9:6	6:5	4	5
6	Denmark	3:9	5:7	3:6	4:6	5:8	*	10:9	8:7	6:5	W	4	5
7	Switzerland	4:7	L	4:7	7:6	4:5	9:10	*	9:6	8:6	10:6	4	5
8	France	L	4:9	5:7	3:5	7:3	7:8	6:9	*	7:5	8:7	3	6
9	Norway	6:7	2:10	6:5	2:5	6:9	5:6	6:8	5:7	*	11:4	2	7
10	Italy	3:7	2:6	5:10	1:10	5:6	L	6:10	7:8	4:11	*	0	9

Teams to playoffs

== Playoffs ==
Semifinal
1	Canada	6
4	Sweden	5
2	Scotland	4
3	United States	3

Gold Medal Game
1	Canada	3
3	Scotland	5
Bronze medal game
4	Sweden	9
2	United States	7

== Final standings ==
Place	Team	Games played	Wins	Losses
1st place, gold medalist(s)	Scotland	11	10	1
2nd place, silver medalist(s)	Canada	11	9	2
3rd place, bronze medalist(s)	Sweden	11	7	4
4	United States	11	6	5
5	West Germany	9	4	5
6	Denmark	9	4	5
7	Switzerland	9	4	5
8	France	9	3	6
9	Norway	9	2	7
10	Italy	9	0	9

== Awards ==
- WJCC Sportsmanship Award: (Scotland) Andrew McQuistin

All-Star Team:

- Skip: (Canada) Mert Thompsett
- Third: (Canada) Lyle Derry
- Second: (Scotland) Hugh Aitken
- Lead: (Sweden) Erik Pettersson
