= Robin Gray (curler) =

Scottish and Irish male curler

- Curler ♂
- Born: 21 December 1963 (age 62); Glasgow, Scotland

Team
- Curling club: Leinster CC

Curling career
- Member Association: Scotland; Ireland
- World Championship: 1 (2006)
- European Championship: 8 (1990, 2004, 2005, 2006, 2007, 2009, 2010, 2011)
- Other appearances: European Mixed Championship: 2 (2012, 2013), World Junior Championships: 1 (1982)
Medal record
Curling
Representing Scotland
European Championships
Silver medal – second place	1990 Lillehammer
World Junior Championships
Bronze medal – third place	1982 Fredericton

Robin Gray (born 21 December 1963 in Glasgow, Scotland) is a Scottish and Irish curler.

== Teams ==
=== Men's ===
Season	Skip	Third	Second	Lead	Alternate	Coach	Events
1981–82	Robin Gray	Mark Stokes	Drew Howie	David Mack			WJCC 1982 (bronze)
1990–91	Robin Gray	Kenneth Knox	Kerr Graham	William Hogg			ECC 1990 (silver)
2004–05	Peter Wilson	Robin Gray	Johnjo Kenny	Peter J.D. Wilson	John Furey	Gordon McIntyre	ECC 2004 (12th)
2005–06	Douglas Dryburgh	Peter Wilson	Robin Gray	Johnjo Kenny	Peter J.D. Wilson		ECC 2005 (7th); WCC 2006 (12th)
2006–07	Robin Gray	Johnjo Kenny	Peter J.D. Wilson	Neil Fyfe	Tony Tierney		ECC 2006 (9th)
2007–08	Peter Wilson	Robin Gray	Peter J.D. Wilson	Neil Fyfe	Tony Tierney	Ron Meyers	ECC 2007 (11th)
2009–10	Robin Gray	Peter Wilson	Johnjo Kenny	Neil Fyfe	Bill Gray	Peter J.D. Wilson	ECC 2009 (14th)
2010–11	Robin Gray	Johnjo Kenny	Bill Gray	Neil Fyfe	John Furey		ECC 2010 (13th)
2011–12	Robin Gray	Johnjo Kenny	Bill Gray	Neil Fyfe	John Furey		ECC 2011 (14th)

=== Mixed ===
Season	Skip	Third	Second	Lead	Coach	Events
2012–13	Robin Gray	Louise Kerr	Johnjo Kenny	Hazel Gormley Leahy		EMxCC 2012 (10th)
2013–14	Robin Gray	Louise Kerr	Johnjo Kenny	Hazel Gormley Leahy	Bill Gray	EMxCC 2013 (18th)
