= Robert Hürlimann =

Swiss curler (born 1967)

- Curler
- Born: 18 August 1967 (age 59); Solothurn, Switzerland

Team
- Skip: Christof Schwaller
- Third: Robert Hürlimann
- Second: Christoph Kaiser
- Lead: Rolf Iseli
- Alternate: Pierre Hug

Curling career
- Member Association: Switzerland
- World Championship: 3 (1998, 2010, 2011)
- European Championship: 3 (1992, 2008, 2010)
- Olympic: 1 (1992)
- Other appearances: World Senior Curling Championships: 1 (2024)
Medal record
Men's curling
Representing Switzerland
Winter Olympics
Gold medal – first place	1992 Albertville (demonstration)
European Championships
Bronze medal – third place	1992 Perth
Bronze medal – third place	2010 Champéry
World Senior Championships
Bronze medal – third place	2023 Gangneung

Robert Hürlimann (born 18 August 1967 in Solothurn) is a Swiss curler.

== Curling career ==
Hürlimann was a member of the Swiss team that won a gold medal at the 1992 Winter Olympics when curling was a demonstration sport. Later that year, he won a bronze medal at his first appearance at the European Curling Championships.

Hürlimann played in his first World Curling Championship in 1998, as the alternate for the Swiss team, but he didn't play any games. He wouldn't return to international competition until 2008, when he played second for Stefan Karnusian at the European Curling Championships. The team finished fourth, with a record of 6-4.

In 2010, Hürlimann, still as second for skip Karusian, played at the World Championships in Cortina d'Ampezzo, Italy. Later that year, Hürlimann earned his second bronze medal at the European Curling Championships, this time playing second for skip Christof Schwaller. A few months later, Hürlimann played for Team Schwaller at the 2011 World Championship, where they finished 7th with a record of 6-5.

Hürlimann returned to the Olympics at the 2014 Winter Games in Sochi, as coach of the Swiss men's team.

== Personal life ==
Hürlimann grew up in Solothurn. He works at a telecom infrastructure installation company.

== Teams ==
1992 Albertville Olympic Games

- Urs Dick, skip
- Jürg Dick, third
- Robert Hürlimann, second
- Thomas Kläy, lead
- Peter Däppen, alternate

1998 World Men's Curling Championship

- Christof Schwaller, skip
- Marc Haudenschild, third
- Reto Ziegler, second
- Rolf Iseli, lead
- Robert Hürlimann, alternate

2010 World Men's Curling Championship

- Stefan Karnusian, skip
- Christof Schwaller, third
- Robert Hürlimann, second
- Rolf Iseli, lead
- Dominic Andres, alternate

2011 World Men's Curling Championship

- Christof Schwaller, skip
- Marco Ramstein, third
- Robert Hürlimann, second
- Urs Eichhorn, lead
- Sven Michel, alternate
