= Jürgen Dick =

Swiss curler (born 1963)

- Curler ♂
- Born: 2 May 1963 (age 63); Solothurn

Team
- Curling club: CC Solothurn-Wengi, Solothurn

Curling career
- Member Association: Switzerland
- European Championship: 1 (1992)
- Olympic: 1 (1992)
- Other appearances: World Junior Championships: 3 (1980, 1981, 1982)
Medal record
Curling
Winter Olympics
Gold medal – first place	1992 Albertville (demonstration)
European Championships
Bronze medal – third place	1992 Perth

Jürgen "Jürg" Dick (born 2 May 1963 in Solothurn) is a former Swiss curler. He played third position on the Swiss rink that won a gold medal at the 1992 Winter Olympics when curling was a demonstration sport. Later that year, he won a bronze medal at his first appearance at the 1992 European Curling Championships. He is also a two-time Swiss junior curling champion curler (1980, 1981).

From 2012 to 2015 Jürgen Dick was a president of Curling Club Solothurn-Wengi, in 2014 he became an honorary member of the club.

== Teams ==
=== Men's ===
Season	Skip	Third	Second	Lead	Alternate	Events
1979–80	Rico Simen	Thomas Kläy	Jürg Dick	Urs Dick		WJCC 1980 (7th)
1979–80	Rico Simen	Thomas Kläy	Jürg Dick	Mario Gross		SJCC 1980 (gold)
1980–81	Rico Simen	Thomas Kläy	Jürg Dick	Mario Gross		WJCC 1981 (6th); SJCC 1981 (gold)
1981–82	Rico Simen	Yves Hugentobler	Jürg Dick	Mario Gross		WJCC 1982 (5 место)
1991–92	Urs Dick	Jürgen Dick	Robert Hürlimann	Thomas Kläy	Peter Däppen	WOG 1992 (demo) (gold)
1992–93	Urs Dick	Jürgen Dick	Robert Hürlimann	Peter Däppen		ECC 1992 (bronze)
1994–95	Urs Dick	Jürgen Dick	Robert Hürlimann	Thomas Kläy		

== Private life ==
His older brother Urs Dick is also a curler and Jürgen's teammate in 1992 Olympic team.
