= Peter Däppen =

Swiss curler (born 1950)

- Curler ♂
- Born: 10 April 1950
- Died: 7 March 2019 (aged 68)

Team
- Curling club: CC Solothurn-Wengi, Solothurn

Curling career
- Member Association: Switzerland
- European Championship: 1 (1992)
- Olympic: 1 (1992)
Medal record
Curling
Winter Olympics
Gold medal – first place	1992 Albertville (demonstration)
European Championships
Bronze medal – third place	1992 Perth

Peter Däppen (10 April 1950 – 7 March 2019) was a Swiss curler. He was an alternate on the Swiss rink that won a gold medal at the 1992 Winter Olympics when curling was a demonstration sport. Later that year, he won a bronze medal at his first appearance at the 1992 European Curling Championships.

== Teams ==
Season	Skip	Third	Second	Lead	Alternate	Events
1991–92	Urs Dick	Jürgen Dick	Robert Hürlimann	Thomas Kläy	Peter Däppen	WOG 1992 (demo) (gold)
1992–93	Urs Dick	Jürgen Dick	Robert Hürlimann	Peter Däppen		ECC 1992 (bronze)
