= 1983 World Junior Curling Championships =

- Host city: Medicine Hat, Alberta, Canada
- Dates: March 13–19
- Men's winner: Canada (2nd title)
- Curling club: Mississaugua G&CC
- Skip: John Base
- Third: Bruce Webster
- Second: Dave McAnerney
- Lead: Jim Donahoe
- Coach: Rick Base
- Finalist: Norway (Pål Trulsen)

The 1983 World Junior Curling Championships were held from March 13 to 19 at the Medicine Hat Arena in Medicine Hat, Alberta, Canada. The tournament only consisted of a men's event.

== Teams ==
Country	Skip	Third	Second	Lead	Coach	Curling club
Canada	John Base	Bruce Webster	Dave McAnerney	Jim Donahoe	Rick Base	
Denmark	Jack Kjaerulf	Lasse Lavrsen	Henrik Jakobsen	Bo Frank		Hvidovre CC
France	Dominique Dupont-Roc	Patrick Philippe	Christian Dupont-Roc	Thierry Mercier		
West Germany	Christoph Möckel	Uwe Saile	Jürgen Kiesel	Andreas Sailer		CC Schwenningen
Italy	Dennis Ghezze	Massimo Constantini	Paolo Bocus	Umberto Vacondio		
Norway	Pål Trulsen	Flemming Davanger	Stig-Arne Gunnestad	Kjell Berg	Bo Bakke	
Scotland	Mike Hay	David Hay	David Smith	Russell Keiller		
Sweden	Sören Grahn	Niclas Järund	Henrik Holmberg	Anders Svennerstedt		Karlstads CK
Switzerland	Raoul Perren	Donat Perren	Diego Perren	Peto Biner		
United States	Al Edwards	Mark Larson	Kenny Mickelson	Dana Westemeier		

== Round robin ==
Place	Team	1	2	3	4	5	6	7	8	9	10	Wins	Losses
1	Canada	*	6:2	2:5	7:4	6:5	7:6	5:7	15:3	6:4	8:5	7	2
2	Norway	2:6	*	4:5	7:4	7:6	6:2	6:3	5:4	8:6	11:3	7	2
3	United States	5:2	5:4	*	5:4	7:8	5:4	6:4	6:4	3:6	10:3	6	3
4	Scotland	4:7	4:7	4:5	*	6:7	10:6	3:5	6:5	7:2	13:4	5	4
4	Denmark	5:6	6:7	8:7	7:6	*	6:4	5:4	2:8	2:7	8:3	5	4
6	Switzerland	6:7	2:6	4:5	6:10	4:6	*	5:2	5:2	4:3	9:3	4	5
7	Sweden	7:5	3:6	4:6	5:3	4:5	2:5	*	6:4	5:6	12:3	4	5
8	Germany	3:15	4:5	4:6	5:6	8:2	2:5	4:6	*	7:4	7:4	3	6
9	France	4:6	6:8	6:3	2:7	7:2	3:4	6:5	4:7	*	1:9	3	6
10	Italy	5:8	3:11	3:10	4:13	3:8	3:9	3:12	4:7	9:1	*	1	8

Teams to playoffs
Teams to tiebreaker

=== Tiebreaker ===
Team	Final
Scotland	4
Denmark	3

== Playoffs ==
Semifinal
1	Canada	7
4	Scotland	5
2	Norway	6
3	United States	4

Gold Medal Game
1	Canada	7
3	Norway	2
Bronze medal game
4	Scotland	6
3	United States	4

== Final standings ==
Place	Team	Games played	Wins	Losses
1st place, gold medalist(s)	Canada	11	9	2
2nd place, silver medalist(s)	Norway	11	8	3
3rd place, bronze medalist(s)	Scotland	12	7	5
4	United States	11	6	5
5	Denmark	10	5	5
6	Switzerland	9	4	5
7	Sweden	9	4	5
8	Germany	9	3	6
9	France	9	3	6
10	Italy	9	1	8

== Awards ==
- WJCC Sportsmanship Award: (Scotland) Mike Hay

All-Star Team:

- Skip: (Canada) John Base
- Third: (Sweden) Niclas Järund
- Second: (Norway) Stig-Arne Gunnestad
- Lead: (United States) Dana Westemeier
