= Stephanie Mayr =

German female curler and Olympic gold medalist

- Curler ♀
- Born: 21 January 1965 (age 61); Potsdam, Germany

Team
- Curling club: SC Riessersee; Garmisch-Partenkirchen, Germany

Curling career
- Member Association: Germany
- World Championship: 1 (1986)
- European Championship: 3 (1988, 1991, 1992)
- Olympic: 1 (1992)
Medal record
Women's curling
Representing Germany
Olympic Games
Gold medal – first place	1992 Albertville (demonstration)
World Championships
Silver medal – second place	1986 Kelowna
European Championships
Gold medal – first place	1991 Chamonix
Bronze medal – third place	1992 Perth

Stephanie Mayr (born 21 January 1965) is a former German curler.

She is a 1992 Winter Olympics champion (demonstration) and 1991 European champion.

== Teams ==
Season	Skip	Third	Second	Lead	Alternate	Events
1985–86	Andrea Schöpp	Monika Wagner	Stephanie Mayr	Birgit Hupertz (EJCC); Elinore Schöpp (WCC)		EJCC 1986 (4th); WCC 1986 (silver)
1986–87	Stephanie Mayr	Simone Vogel	Kerstin Jüders	Dona Schuman		EJCC 1987 (4th)
1988–89	Stephanie Mayr	Simone Vogel	Sabine Belkofer	Hatti Foster		ECC 1988 (6th)
1991–92	Andrea Schöpp	Stephanie Mayr	Monika Wagner	Sabine Huth	Christiane Scheibel (OG)	ECC 1991 (gold); OG 1992 (demo) (gold)
1992–93	Andrea Schöpp	Monika Wagner	Stephanie Mayr	Christiane Scheibel		ECC 1992 (bronze)
