= Christiane Jentsch =

German female curler and Olympic gold medalist

- Curler ♀
- Born: 13 July 1961 (age 65)

Team
- Curling club: CC Füssen, SC Riessersee; Garmisch-Partenkirchen, Germany

Curling career
- Member Association: Germany
- World Championship: 1 (1985)
- European Championship: 1 (1992)
- Olympic: 1 (1992)
Medal record
Curling
Olympics
Gold medal – first place	1992 Albertville (demonstration)
European Championships
Bronze medal – third place	1992 Perth
German Women's Championship
Silver medal – second place	1997

Christiane Jentsch (born 13 July 1961; in marriage was known as Christiane Scheibel) is a former German curler.

She won a gold medal at the 1992 Winter Olympics when curling was a demonstration sport.

She was skip of women's team of Curling Club Füssen in 1980-1984 and 1994-2001. In seasons 1985/1986 and 1991/1992 she played in Andrea Schöpp's team out of SC Riessersee (Garmisch-Partenkirchen).

Christiane Jentsch retired from competitive curling in 2002.

== Teams ==
Season	Skip	Third	Second	Lead	Alternate	Events
1984–85	Andrea Schöpp	Monika Wagner	Christiane Jentsch	Elinore Schöpp		WCC 1985 (5th)
1991–92	Andrea Schöpp	Stephanie Mayr	Monika Wagner	Sabine Huth	Christiane Scheibel (OG)	OG 1992 (demo) (gold)
1992–93	Andrea Schöpp	Monika Wagner	Stephanie Mayr	Christiane Scheibel		ECC 1992 (bronze)
