= Mario Gross =

Swiss male curler and coach

- Curler ♂

Team
- Curling club: Solothurn GCS, Solothurn, Lausanne-Ouchy CC, Lausanne, Lausanne-Olympique CC, Lausanne

Curling career
- Member Association: Switzerland
- World Championship: 2 (1986, 1989)
- European Championship: 1 (1985)
- Other appearances: World Junior Championships: 2 (1981, 1982)
Medal record
Curling
World Championships
Bronze medal – third place	1989 Milwaukee
Swiss Men's Championship
Gold medal – first place	1986 Wildhaus
Gold medal – first place	1989 Engelber

Mario Gross is a Swiss curler and curling coach.

He is a 1989 World Men's silver medallist and a two-time Swiss men's champion (1986, 1989).

== Teams ==
Season	Skip	Third	Second	Lead	Events
1979–80	Rico Simen	Thomas Kläy	Jürg Dick	Mario Gross	SJCC 1980 (gold)
1980–81	Rico Simen	Thomas Kläy	Jürg Dick	Mario Gross	WJCC 1981 (6th); SJCC 1981 (gold)
1981–82	Rico Simen	Yves Hugentobler	Jürg Dick	Mario Gross	WJCC 1982 (5th)
1985–86	Jürg Tanner	Patrick Hürlimann	Patrik Lörtscher	Mario Gross	ECC 1985 (5th); SMCC 1986 (gold); WCC 1986 (5th)
1988–89	Patrick Hürlimann	Andreas Hänni	Patrik Lörtscher	Mario Gross	SMCC 1989 (gold); WCC 1989 (silver)
2003–04	Patrick Hürlimann	Patrik Lörtscher	Mario Gross	Marco Battilana	

== Record as a coach of national teams ==
Year	Tournament, event	National team	Place
2004	2004 European Curling Championships	Switzerland (women)	2nd place, silver medalist(s)
2005	2005 European Curling Championships	Switzerland (women)	2nd place, silver medalist(s)
2006	2006 Winter Olympics	Switzerland (women)	2nd place, silver medalist(s)
