= Sabine Huth =

German curler (born 1967)

- Curler ♀
- Born: 3 January 1967 (age 59)

Team
- Curling club: SC Riessersee; Garmisch-Partenkirchen, Germany

Curling career
- Member Association: Germany
- European Championship: 1 (1991)
- Olympic: 1 (1992)
Medal record
Women's curling
Representing Germany
Olympic Games
Gold medal – first place	1992 Albertville (demonstration)
European Championships
Gold medal – first place	1991 Chamonix

Sabine Huth (born 3 January 1967) is a former German curler.

She won a gold medal at the 1992 Winter Olympics when curling was a demonstration sport and also won the 1991 European Curling Championship.

== Teams ==
Season	Skip	Third	Second	Lead	Alternate	Events
1984–85	Barbara Haller	Christina Haller	Sabine Huth	Heike Wieländer		EJCC 1985 (7th)
1991–92	Andrea Schöpp	Stephanie Mayr	Monika Wagner	Sabine Huth	Christiane Scheibel (OG)	ECC 1991 (gold); OG 1992 (demo) (gold)
