= Rico Simen =

Swiss curler

- Curler ♂
- Born: 12 January 1962 (age 64)

Team
- Curling club: CC Lausanne Olympique, Lausanne

Curling career
- Member Association: Switzerland
- European Championship: 1 (1994)
- Olympic: 1 (1988; demo)
- Other appearances: World Junior Championships: 3 (1980, 1981, 1982)
Medal record
Curling
Winter Olympics
Silver medal – second place	1988 Calgary (demonstration)
European Championships
Silver medal – second place	1994 Sundsvall
Swiss Men's Championship
Silver medal – second place	1994 Biel/Bienne
Bronze medal – third place	1997 Bern

Enrico "Rico" Simen (born 12 January 1962) is a former Swiss curler.

He played third on the Swiss rink that won a silver medal at the 1988 Winter Olympics when curling was a demonstration sport. He was also a silver medallist at the 1994 European Curling Championships, and is a silver (1994) and bronze (1997) medallist at the Swiss Men's Curling Championship, and a two-time Swiss junior champion curler (1980, 1981).

== Teams ==
Season	Skip	Third	Second	Lead	Alternate	Coach	Events
1979–80	Rico Simen	Thomas Kläy	Jürg Dick	Urs Dick			WJCC 1980 (7th)
1979–80	Rico Simen	Thomas Kläy	Jürg Dick	Mario Gross			SJCC 1980 (gold)
1980–81	Rico Simen	Thomas Kläy	Jürg Dick	Mario Gross			WJCC 1981 (6th); SJCC 1981 (gold)
1981–82	Rico Simen	Yves Hugentobler	Jürg Dick	Mario Gross			WJCC 1982 (5 место)
1987–88	Hansjörg Lips	Rico Simen	Stefan Luder	Peter Lips	Mario Flückiger		WOG 1988 (demo) (silver)
1994–95	Hansjörg Lips	Stefan Luder	Peter Lips	Rico Simen	Björn Schröder	Michael Müller	ECC 1994 (silver)
