= Andrew McQuistin =

Scottish male curler

- Curler ♂

Team
- Curling club: Carmunnock & Rutherglen CC, Glasgow, Magnum CC, Irvine

Curling career
- Member Association: Scotland
- World Championship: 2 (1983, 1989)
- Other appearances: World Junior Championships: 3 (1975, 1979, 1980), World Senior Championships: 1 (2013)
Medal record
Curling
Scottish Men's Championship
Gold medal – first place	1983
Gold medal – first place	1989
World Junior Championships
Gold medal – first place	1980 Kitchener
Silver medal – second place	1979 Moose Jaw
Bronze medal – third place	1975 East York

Andrew McQuistin (born c. 1960) is a Scottish curler, originally from Stranraer.

At the international level, he is a 1980 World junior champion curler.

At the national level, he is a two-time Scottish men's champion curler, a one-time Scottish mixed champion curler, a three-time Scottish junior champion curler and one-time Scottish senior champion curler.

As of the 1980 World Juniors, McQusitin was employed as a farmer.

== Awards ==
- WJCC Sportsmanship Award: 1979, 1980

== Teams ==
=== Men's ===
Season	Skip	Third	Second	Lead	Alternate	Coach	Events
1974–75	Peter J.D. Wilson	Andrew McQuistin	Neale McQuistin	John Sharp			SJCC 1975 (gold); WJCC 1975 (bronze)
1978–79	Andrew McQuistin	Neale McQuistin	Hugh Aitken	Dick Adams			SJCC 1979 (gold); WJCC 1979 (silver)
1979–80	Andrew McQuistin	Norman Brown	Hugh Aitken	Dick Adams			SJCC 1980 (gold); WJCC 1980 (gold)
1981–82	Graeme P. Adam	Ken J. Horton	Andrew McQuistin	Robert A. Cowan			EdInt 1982 (gold)
1982–83	Graeme Adam	Ken Horton	Andrew McQuistin	Bob Cowan			SMCC 1983 (gold); WCC 1983 (5th)
1988–89	Graeme Adam	Ken Horton	Andrew McQuistin	Robin Copland			SMCC 1989 (gold); WCC 1989 (5th)
2008–09	Graeme Connal	Norman Brown	Andrew McQuistin	Kenny Kinnear			
2012–13	David Hay	Norman Brown	Andrew McQuistin	Roger McIntyre			
2012–13	David Hay	Norman Brown	Andrew McQuistin	Hugh Aitken	Gordon Muirhead (WSCC)	Gordon Muirhead	SSCC 2013 (gold); WSCC 2013 (5th)

=== Men's ===
Season	Skip	Third	Second	Lead	Events
1980–81	Andrew McQuistin	Joyce Kinnear	Hammy McMillan	Jean Caldwell	SMxCC 1981 (gold)
