= 1982 World Junior Curling Championships =

- Host city: Fredericton, New Brunswick, Canada
- Dates: March 14–21
- Men's winner: Sweden (2nd title)
- Curling club: Karlstads CK, Karlstad
- Skip: Sören Grahn
- Third: Niclas Järund
- Second: Henrik Holmberg
- Lead: Anders Svennerstedt
- Finalist: Canada (Mert Thompsett)

The 1982 World Junior Curling Championships were held from March 14 to 21 at the Aitken Centre in Fredericton, New Brunswick, Canada. The tournament only consisted of a men's event.

== Teams ==
Country	Skip	Third	Second	Lead	Coach	Curling club
Canada	Mert Thompsett	Bill Jr McTavish	Joel Gagne	Mike Friesen		
Denmark	Jack Kjaerulf	Lasse Lavrsen	Henrik Jakobsen	Bo Frank		Hvidovre CC
France	Christophe Boan	Philippe Pomi	Christophe Michaud	Patrick Philippe		
West Germany	Christoph Möckel	Uwe Saile	Jürgen Kiesel	Andreas Sailer		CC Schwenningen
Italy	Adriano Lorenzi	Enrico Fumagalli	Roberto Lacedelli	Massimo Constantini		
Norway	Morten Skaug	Tom Sørlundsengen	Helge Smeby	Yngve Slyngstad	Bo Bakke	Brumunddal CC, Oslo
Scotland	Robin Gray	Mark Stokes	Drew Howie	David Mack		
Sweden	Sören Grahn	Niclas Järund	Henrik Holmberg	Anders Svennerstedt		Karlstads CK
Switzerland	Rico Simen	Yves Hugentobler	Jürg Dick	Mario Gross		
United States	Dale Risling	Milton Jr Best	Rob Foster	Jim Foster		

== Round robin ==
Place	Team	1	2	3	4	5	6	7	8	9	10	Wins	Losses
1	Sweden	*	8:5	4:3	10:2	10:1	9:5	13:3	6:4	9:5	9:3	9	0
2	Scotland	5:8	*	5:4	6:4	2:7	10:8	7:5	4:3	5:8	6:5	6	3
3	Canada	3:4	4:5	*	7:8	8:5	6:3	11:3	12:5	6:4	5:2	6	3
3	United States	2:10	4:6	8:7	*	7:5	6:4	9:3	4:3	9:5	5:7	6	3
5	Switzerland	1:10	7:2	5:8	5:7	*	6:4	6:5	2:8	8:7	10:3	5	4
6	Norway	5:9	8:10	3:6	4:6	4:6	*	9:2	7:5	6:4	8:1	4	5
7	France	3:13	5:7	3:11	3:9	5:6	2:9	*	8:6	7:5	7:6	3	6
8	Germany	4:6	3:4	5:12	3:4	8:2	5:7	6:8	*	5:4	9:8	3	6
9	Denmark	5:9	8:5	4:6	5:9	7:8	4:6	5:7	4:5	*	12:6	2	7
10	Italy	3:9	5:6	2:5	7:5	3:10	1:8	6:7	8:9	6:12	*	1	8

Teams to playoffs
Teams to tiebreaker

=== Tiebreaker ===
Team	Final
Canada	8
United States	6

== Playoffs ==
Semifinal
1	Sweden
2	Scotland	2
3	Canada	4

Gold Medal Game
1	Sweden	6
3	Canada	2

== Final standings ==
Place	Team	Games played	Wins	Losses
1st place, gold medalist(s)	Sweden	10	10	0
2nd place, silver medalist(s)	Canada	12	8	4
3rd place, bronze medalist(s)	Scotland	10	6	4
4	United States	10	6	4
5	Switzerland	9	5	4
6	Norway	9	4	5
7	France	9	3	6
8	Germany	9	3	6
9	Denmark	9	2	7
10	Italy	9	1	8

== Awards ==
- WJCC Sportsmanship Award: (West Germany) Christoph Möckel

All-Star Team:

- Skip: (Sweden) Sören Grahn
- Third: (Sweden) Niclas Järund
- Second: (Canada) Joel Gagne
- Lead: (Canada) Mike Friesen
