= Thomas Kläy =

Swiss curler (born 1961)

- Curler ♂
- Born: 28 June 1961 (age 65)

Team
- Curling club: CC Solothurn-Wengi, Solothurn

Curling career
- Member Association: Switzerland
- Olympic: 1 (1992)
- Other appearances: World Junior Championships: 2 (1980, 1981)
Medal record
Curling
Winter Olympics
Gold medal – first place	1992 Albertville (demonstration)

Thomas Kläy (born 28 June 1961) is a former Swiss curler. He played lead position on the Swiss rink that won a gold medal at the 1992 Winter Olympics when curling was a demonstration sport. He is also a two-time Swiss junior curling champion curler (1980, 1981).

== Teams ==
=== Men's ===
Season	Skip	Third	Second	Lead	Alternate	Events
1979–80	Rico Simen	Thomas Kläy	Jürg Dick	Urs Dick		WJCC 1980 (7th)
1979–80	Rico Simen	Thomas Kläy	Jürg Dick	Mario Gross		SJCC 1980 (gold)
1980–81	Rico Simen	Thomas Kläy	Jürg Dick	Mario Gross		WJCC 1981 (6th); SJCC 1981 (gold)
1991–92	Urs Dick	Jürgen Dick	Robert Hürlimann	Thomas Kläy	Peter Däppen	WOG 1992 (demo) (gold)
1994–95	Urs Dick	Jürgen Dick	Robert Hürlimann	Thomas Kläy		
