= Pralognan-la-Vanoise =

Alpine commune in France

Pralognan-la-Vanoise Pralonyan (Arpitan)
- Commune
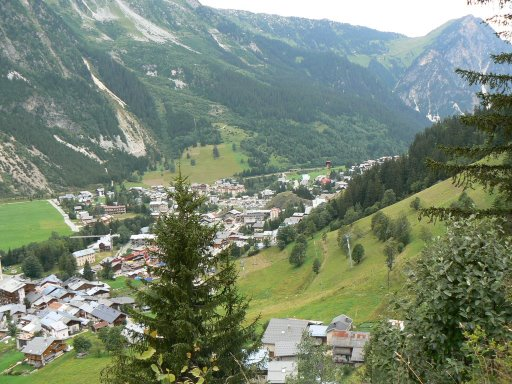
- A general view of Pralognan-la-Vanoise

- Coat of arms
- Location of Pralognan-la-Vanoise
- Location within France Location within Auvergne-Rhône-Alpes
- Coordinates: 45°22′57″N 6°43′20″E
- Country: France
- Region: Auvergne-Rhône-Alpes
- Department: Savoie
- Arrondissement: Albertville
- Canton: Moûtiers

Government
  - Mayor (2023–2026): Martine Blanc
- Area^{1}: 88.57 km^{2} (34.20 sq mi)
- Highest elevation: 3,855 m (12,648 ft)
- Lowest elevation: 1,208 m (3,963 ft)
- Population (2023): 689
  - Density: 7.78/km^{2} (20.1/sq mi)
- Time zone: UTC+01:00 (CET)
  - Summer (DST): UTC+02:00 (CEST)
- INSEE/Postal code: 73206 /73710
- Website: www.pralognan.com
- ^{1} French Land Register data, which excludes lakes, ponds, glaciers > 1 km^{2} (0.386 sq mi or 247 acres) and river estuaries.

Pralognan-la-Vanoise (French pronunciation: [pʁalɔɲɑ̃ la vanwaz]) or simply Pralognan (Arpitan: Pralonyan) is an alpine commune in the Savoie department in the Auvergne-Rhône-Alpes region in Southeastern France. As of 2023, the population of the commune was 689. The commune is located within Vanoise National Park.

The Patinoire olympique was the curling venue for the 1992 Winter Olympics hosted in Albertville and surroundings in the French Alps.

== Geography ==
=== Climate ===
Pralognan-la-Vanoise has a humid continental climate (Köppen climate classification Dfb). The average annual temperature in Pralognan-la-Vanoise is 6.0 °C (42.8 °F). The average annual rainfall is 1,105.6 mm (43.53 in) with May as the wettest month. The temperatures are highest on average in July, at around 15.1 °C (59.2 °F), and lowest in January, at around −2.8 °C (27.0 °F). The highest temperature ever recorded in Pralognan-la-Vanoise was 33.5 °C (92.3 °F) on 31 July 1983; the coldest temperature ever recorded was −27.4 °C (−17.3 °F) on 3 February 1956.

Climate data for Pralognan-la-Vanoise (1991−2020 normals, extremes 1934−present)
Month	Jan	Feb	Mar	Apr	May	Jun	Jul	Aug	Sep	Oct	Nov	Dec	Year
Record high °C (°F)	12.0 (53.6)	17.3 (63.1)	19.1 (66.4)	22.8 (73.0)	26.8 (80.2)	32.2 (90.0)	33.5 (92.3)	31.0 (87.8)	27.2 (81.0)	24.0 (75.2)	19.8 (67.6)	17.1 (62.8)	33.5 (92.3)
Mean daily maximum °C (°F)	1.2 (34.2)	2.8 (37.0)	6.9 (44.4)	10.3 (50.5)	14.7 (58.5)	18.6 (65.5)	21.0 (69.8)	20.7 (69.3)	16.3 (61.3)	12.1 (53.8)	5.7 (42.3)	1.6 (34.9)	11.0 (51.8)
Daily mean °C (°F)	−2.8 (27.0)	−2.0 (28.4)	1.8 (35.2)	5.1 (41.2)	9.4 (48.9)	13.1 (55.6)	15.1 (59.2)	14.9 (58.8)	11.0 (51.8)	7.1 (44.8)	1.7 (35.1)	−2.1 (28.2)	6.0 (42.8)
Mean daily minimum °C (°F)	−6.8 (19.8)	−6.8 (19.8)	−3.4 (25.9)	0.0 (32.0)	4.1 (39.4)	7.5 (45.5)	9.2 (48.6)	9.2 (48.6)	5.7 (42.3)	2.2 (36.0)	−2.4 (27.7)	−5.7 (21.7)	1.1 (34.0)
Record low °C (°F)	−24.4 (−11.9)	−27.4 (−17.3)	−23.5 (−10.3)	−12.5 (9.5)	−8.1 (17.4)	−4.1 (24.6)	0.0 (32.0)	−1.2 (29.8)	−5.0 (23.0)	−12.3 (9.9)	−19.3 (−2.7)	−21.7 (−7.1)	−27.4 (−17.3)
Average precipitation mm (inches)	95.1 (3.74)	78.0 (3.07)	77.2 (3.04)	72.2 (2.84)	110.5 (4.35)	97.5 (3.84)	97.8 (3.85)	96.1 (3.78)	83.7 (3.30)	94.9 (3.74)	97.3 (3.83)	105.3 (4.15)	1,105.6 (43.53)
Average precipitation days (≥ 1.0 mm)	9.5	9.3	9.6	9.6	12.5	12.2	10.9	10.5	9.5	9.5	10.0	10.6	123.6
Source: Météo-France

== See also ==
- Communes of the Savoie department
