= Hugh Aitken (curler) =

Scottish curler

- Curler ♂

Curling career
- Member Association: Scotland
- European Championship: 2 (1984, 1989)
- Other appearances: World Senior Championships: 4 (2013, 2015, 2016, 2018)
Medal record
Curling
European Championships
Gold medal – first place	1989 Engelberg
Silver medal – second place	1984 Morzine
Scottish Men's Championship
Bronze medal – third place	2005

Hugh Aitken is a Scottish curler. He is a 1989 European champion.

== Awards ==
- WJCC All-Star Team, Men: 1979, 1980

== Teams ==
=== Men's ===
Season	Skip	Third	Second	Lead	Alternate	Coach	Events
1978–79	Andrew McQuistin	Neale McQuistin	Hugh Aitken	Dick Adams			SJCC 1979 (gold); WJCC 1979 (silver)
1979–80	Andrew McQuistin	Norman Brown	Hugh Aitken	Dick Adams			SJCC 1980 (gold); WJCC 1980 (gold)
1984–85	Peter Wilson	Norman Brown	Hugh Aitken	Roger McIntyre			ECC 1984 (silver)
1989–90	Hammy McMillan	Norman Brown	Hugh Aitken	Jim Cannon			ECC 1989 (gold)
2002–03	Hammy McMillan	Norman Brown	Hugh Aitken	Roger McIntyre			CC 2002 (silver)
2003–04	Hammy McMillan	Norman Brown	Hugh Aitken	Roger McIntyre			CC 2003 (silver)
2004–05	Hammy McMillan	Hugh Aitken	Philip Watson	David Hardie			SMCC 2005 (bronze)
2005–06	Hammy McMillan	Hugh Aitken	Philip Watson	David Hardie			SMCC 2006 (5th)
2012–13	David Hay	Norman Brown	Andrew McQuistin	Hugh Aitken	Gordon Muirhead	Gordon Muirhead	WSCC 2013 (5th)
2014–15	Gordon Muirhead	Norman Brown	David Hay	Hugh Aitken	Mike Hay		WSCC 2015 (5th)
2015–16	Gordon Muirhead	Norman Brown	David Hay	Hugh Aitken			WSCC 2016 (5th)
2017–18	Gordon Muirhead	Norman Brown	David Hay	Hugh Aitken			WSCC 2018 (4th)

=== Mixed ===
Season	Skip	Third	Second	Lead	Events
1981–82	Hugh Aitken	Fiona McMillan	Norman Brown	Janie Ferguson	SMxCC 1982 (gold)
1987–88	Hugh Aitken	Gail McMillan	Hammy McMillan	Marie McWilliam	SMxCC 1988 (gold)
