= 2019 Continental Cup =

2019 Continental Cup may refer to:

- 2019 Continental Cup (cricket), a Twenty20 International (T20I) tournament in Romania
- 2019 Continental Cup (curling), an intercontinental event in Paradise, Nevada
- 2018–19 IIHF Continental Cup, a European ice hockey competition
- 2018–19 FA Women's League Cup, an English football competition sponsored by Continental Tyres
