= Patinoire olympique de Pralognan-la-Vanoise =

Curling venue for 1992 Winter Olympics

Coordinates: 45°22′37″N 6°43′20″E

Patinoire olympique de Pralognan-la-Vanoise is a 2,300-seat indoor arena located in Pralognan-la-Vanoise, France. The venue hosted the curling competitions for the 1992 Winter Olympics in neighboring Albertville. It was then a demonstration sport.

== Post-olympic use ==
The building is now a recreation center for the resort of Pralognan. Besides the ice rink, it offers an indoor swimming pool, a sauna and a jacuzzi as well as a bowling alley.
