= Norman Brown (curler) =

Scottish curler (born 1961)

- Curler ♂
- Born: 10 September 1961 (age 65); Bankfoot, Perth and Kinross, Scotland

Team
- Curling club: Castle Kennedy CC, Stranraer, Airleywight CC, Perth, Stoneykirk CC

Curling career
- Member Association: Scotland
- World Championship: 3 (1992, 1997, 2002)
- European Championship: 7 (1984, 1989, 1993, 1994, 1995, 1996, 2001)
- Olympic: 2 (1992, 2002)
- Other appearances: World Junior Curling Championships: 1 (1980), World Senior Curling Championships: 4 (2013, 2015, 2016, 2018)
Medal record
Curling
World Championships
Silver medal – second place	1992 Garmisch-Partenkirchen
Bronze medal – third place	1997 Bern
Bronze medal – third place	2002 Bismarck
European Championships
Gold medal – first place	1989 Engelberg
Gold medal – first place	1994 Sundsvall
Gold medal – first place	1995 Grindelwald
Gold medal – first place	1996 Kopenhagen
Silver medal – second place	1984 Morzine
Scottish Men's Championship
Gold medal – first place	1992
Gold medal – first place	1997
Gold medal – first place	2001
World Junior Championships
Gold medal – first place	1980 Kitchener

Norman Brown (born 10 September 1961) is a Scottish curler.

Brown is a four-time European curling champion, World men's silver and bronze medallist, played for the Great Britain team in two Winter Olympics: 1992 (where curling was a demonstration sport; 5th place) and 2002 (7th place).

Brown started curling at the age of nine, when the Stranraer rink first opened in 1970.

== Teams ==
Season	Skip	Third	Second	Lead	Alternate	Coach	Events
1979–80	Andrew McQuistin	Norman Brown	Hugh Aitken	Dick Adams			SJCC 1980 (gold); WJCC 1980 (gold)
1984–85	Peter Wilson	Norman Brown	Hugh Aitken	Roger McIntyre			ECC 1994 (silver)
1989–90	Hammy McMillan	Norman Brown	Hugh Aitken	Jim Cannon			ECC 1989 (gold)
1991–92	Hammy McMillan	Norman Brown	Gordon Muirhead	Roger McIntyre	Robert Kelly (OG)		OG 1992 (demo) (5th); SMCC 1992 (gold); WCC 1992 (silver)
1993–94	Hammy McMillan	Norman Brown	Gordon Muirhead	Roger McIntyre	Peter Loudon		ECC 1993 (4th)
1994–95	Hammy McMillan	Norman Brown	Mike Hay	Roger McIntyre	Gordon Muirhead	Hew Chalmers	ECC 1994 (gold)
1995–96	Hammy McMillan	Norman Brown	Mike Hay	Roger McIntyre	Brian Binnie	Hew Chalmers	ECC 1995 (gold)
1996–97	Hammy McMillan	Norman Brown	Mike Hay	Brian Binnie	Peter Loudon (ECC, WCC)		ECC 1996 (gold); SMCC 1997 (gold); WCC 1997 (bronze)
2001–02	Hammy McMillan	Warwick Smith	Ewan MacDonald	Norman Brown	Mike Hay	Derek Brown	ECC 2001 (5th)
2001–02	Hammy McMillan	Warwick Smith	Ewan MacDonald	Peter Loudon	Norman Brown	Derek Brown	OG 2002 (7th)
2001–02	Warwick Smith	Norman Brown	Ewan MacDonald	Peter Loudon	Tom Brewster	Derek Brown	WCC 2002 (bronze)
2008–09	Graeme Connal	Norman Brown	Andrew McQuistin	Kenny Kinnear			
2010–11	Mike Hay	David Hay	Norman Brown	Kenny Kinnear			
2012–13	David Hay	Norman Brown	Andrew McQuistin	Hugh Aitken	Gordon Muirhead	Gordon Muirhead	WSCC 2013 (5th)
2014–15	Gordon Muirhead	Norman Brown	David Hay	Hugh Aitken	Mike Hay		WSCC 2015 (5th)
2015–16	Gordon Muirhead	Norman Brown	David Hay	Hugh Aitken			WSCC 2016 (5th)
2017–18	Gordon Muirhead	Norman Brown	David Hay	Hugh Aitken			WSCC 2018 (4th)
