= Urs Dick =

Swiss curler (born 1960)

- Curler ♂
- Born: 9 October 1960 (age 66)

Team
- Curling club: CC Solothurn-Wengi, Solothurn

Curling career
- Member Association: Switzerland
- European Championship: 1 (1992)
- Olympic: 1 (1992)
- Other appearances: World Junior Championships: 1 (1980)
Medal record
Curling
Winter Olympics
| Gold medal – first place | 1992 Albertville (demonstration) |
European Championships
| Bronze medal – third place | 1992 Perth |

Urs Dick (born 9 October 1960) is a former Swiss curler. He played skip position on the Swiss rink that won a gold medal at the 1992 Winter Olympics when curling was a demonstration sport. Later that year, he won a bronze medal at his first appearance at the 1992 European Curling Championships. He is also a Swiss mixed curling champion curler (1993) and curling coach.

== Teams ==
=== Men's ===
| Season | Skip | Third | Second | Lead | Alternate | Events |
|---|---|---|---|---|---|---|
| 1979–80 | Rico Simen | Thomas Kläy | Jürg Dick | Urs Dick | | WJCC 1980 (7th) |
| 1991–92 | Urs Dick | Jürgen Dick | Robert Hürlimann | Thomas Kläy | Peter Däppen | WOG 1992 (demo) (gold) |
| 1992–93 | Urs Dick | Jürgen Dick | Robert Hürlimann | Peter Däppen | | ECC 1992 (bronze) |
| 1994–95 | Urs Dick | Jürgen Dick | Robert Hürlimann | Thomas Kläy | | |

=== Mixed ===
| Season | Skip | Third | Second | Lead | Events |
|---|---|---|---|---|---|
| 1992–93 | Urs Dick | Nicole Strausak | Robert Hürlimann | Tatjana Stalder | SMxCC 1993 (gold) |

== Record as a coach of national teams ==
| Year | Tournament, event | National team | Place |
|---|---|---|---|
| 2013 | 2013 World Junior Curling Championships | Switzerland (junior women) | 8 |

== Private life ==
His younger brother Jürgen "Jürg" Dick is also a curler and Urs's teammate in 1992 Olympic team.
