= Pål Trulsen =

Norwegian curler (born 1962)

- Curler ♂
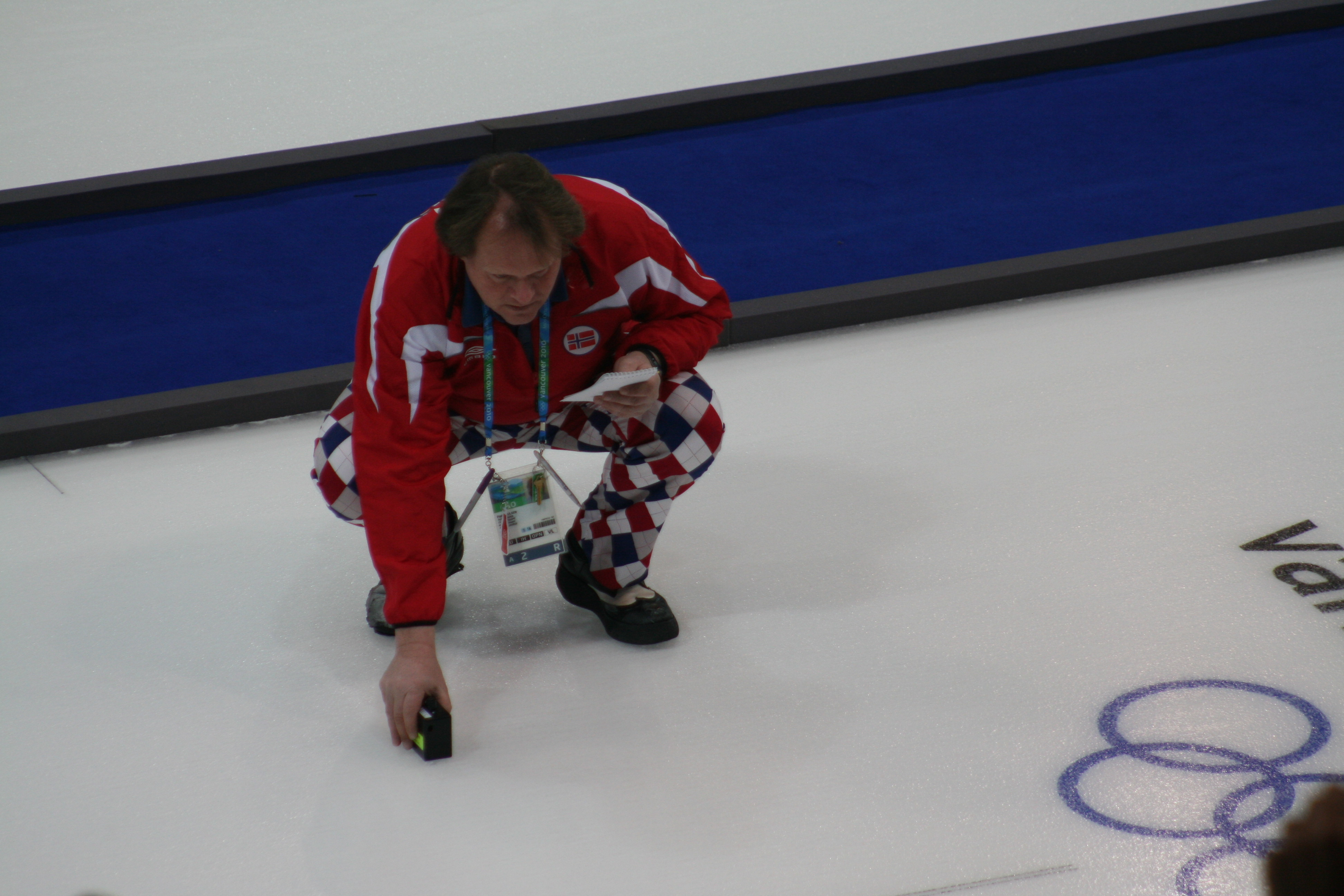
- Trulsen as coach of Team Norway at the 2010 Winter Olympics
- Born: 19 April 1962 (age 64); Drøbak, Norway

Curling career
- World Championship: 9 (1993, 1997, 1999, 2000, 2001, 2002, 2003, 2004, 2005)
- European Championship: 6 (1981, 1982, 1999, 2001, 2004, 2005)
- Olympic: 3 (1992, 2002, 2006)
Medal record
Men's curling
Representing Norway
Olympic Games
Gold medal – first place	2002 Salt Lake City	Team
Silver medal – second place	1992 Albertville (demonstration)	Team
World Curling Championships
Silver medal – second place	2002 Bismarck
Bronze medal – third place	2001 Lausanne
Bronze medal – third place	2003 Winnipeg
European Championships
Gold medal – first place	2005 Garmisch-Partenkirchen
Bronze medal – third place	2004 Sofia
World Junior Championships
Silver medal – second place	1983 Medicine Hat

Pål Trulsen (born 19 April 1962 in Drøbak, Norway) is a Norwegian curler from Hosle in Bærum, and was the 2002 Olympic curling men's champion.

== Career ==
Trulsen participated in both the 1980 and 1981 World Junior Championships, finishing both tournaments with 2-7 and 4-5 records respectively. However, after participating in the 1981 and 1982 European championships, he was back at the juniors in 1983 where he won the silver medal, losing to Canada's John Base in the final. It took Trulsen 9 more years to get back on the world stage, at the 1992 Winter Olympics, where curling was a demonstration sport. At this event he won a silver medal, losing to Switzerland's Urs Dick in the final. After four World Championship tournaments in 1993, 1997, 1999 and 2000 in which he did not receive any medals, Trulsen won the bronze at the 2001 Ford World Curling Championship, defeating one of the games great teams of Randy Ferbey (David Nedohin throwing 4th stones), in the bronze medal game. A year later, Trulsen became world-famous as he won the gold medal at the Olympics defeating Canada's Kevin Martin in the final. After reaching the top, Trulsen would later decline, winning silver at the 2002 Ford World Curling Championship, bronze at the 2003 Ford World Curling Championship and a fourth-place finish at the 2004 Ford World Curling Championship where he missed a fairly standard final draw against European arch rival and eventual winner Peja Lindholm in the semi-finals.

Trulsen finished in fourth place once again at the 2005 Ford World Men's Curling Championship, losing to Canada's Randy Ferbey in a 3–4 game, in a wild tournament where 6 teams entered the playoffs all but tied for 1st with exactly the same record at 8-3 leading to numerous tiebreakers and playoff games to sort out. Trulsen himself would require a tiebreak win over Pete Fenson of the U.S to advance to the playoffs, and in losing to eventual winner Ferbey would miss a pretty easy final shot for victory, and shoot only 75% for the game vs 4th rock throw David Nedohin's 91%. Trulsen would finally win another tournament, when he won the 2005 European Championships against Peja Lindholm of Sweden, setting him up as a favorite to defend his Olympic title. However, he failed to advance from the preliminaries in the 2006 Winter Olympics after a combination of variable play and bad luck. A large part of his inability to add to his Olympic Gold in 2002 with another World or Olympic win was increasing knee problems from 2002 onwards.

Prior to the 2006 Winter Olympics, it was reported that Trulsen was considering retiring from curling, largely to his growing knee pain. He finally did retire in January 2007. While remembered for his easy going and fun personality, he was also remembered as being an extremely fierce and hungry competitor in the heat of battle.

Trulsen coached the Norwegian Olympic curling team at the 2010 Winter Olympics in Vancouver, Canada. They made it to the final, this time Kevin Martin's Canadian team beating them for the gold.

Trulsen has been the Coach of the European Continental Cup Team the past 2 years (2016 and 2017).

In 2024, he was inducted into the World Curling Hall of Fame.

== Awards ==
- Colin Campbell Award: 2002
