= Tormod Andreassen =

Norwegian curler

Tormod Andreassen (born 29 March 1951) is a Norwegian curler and curling coach.

Andreassen has skipped Norway at 3 World Championships (1986, 1993 and 1994), finishing sixth place each time. He skipped Norway the 1992 Winter Olympics when curling was a demonstration sport. Norway won the silver medal, losing to Switzerland (skipped by Urs Dick) in the final.

Andreassen has also played in four European Curling Championships (1986, 1991, 1996, 1998), winning the bronze in 1986 and 1998.

In 2003, 2004, 2005 and 2006, Andreassens skipped the national seniors team at the World Senior Curling Championships.

Andreassen represented Norway at the inaugural 2008 World Mixed Doubles Curling Championship, partnered with his daughter Linn Githmark.
