= Kjell Berg =

Norwegian curler

Kjell Berg (born 11 March 1962) is a Norwegian curler.

Berg has played in the lead position for his entire international career.

Berg won a silver medal at the 1983 World Junior Curling Championships playing for Pål Trulsen. He also won a silver medal at the 1992 Winter Olympics, when curling was a demonstration sport (playing for Tormod Andreassen) and two bronze medals at the European Curling Championships in 1986 and 1998.
