= Peter Wilson (curler) =

Irish curler

Medal record

Curling

Representing Scotland

World Junior Curling Championships
Gold medal – first place	1981 Megève	

European Curling Championships
Silver medal – second place	1984 Morzine	
Bronze medal – third place	1987 Füssen	

Representing Ireland

World Senior Curling Championships
Bronze medal – third place	2016 Karlstad	
Bronze medal – third place	2017 Lethbridge	

Peter Wilson (born 9 December 1961 in Stranraer, Scotland) is an Irish curler.

In 1981, Wilson skipped his native Scotland to a gold medal at the 1981 World Junior Curling Championships over Denis Marchand of Canada. Three years later he skipped Scotland to a silver medal at the European Curling Championships, losing to Peter Attinger, Jr. of Switzerland. Wilson would not return to a major international tournament until 1997. In 1997 he returned to the European Championship as Douglas Dryburgh, third for Scotland. The team won the bronze medal. The next year he travelled with Dryburgh to the 1998 Winter Olympics and the team finished in seventh.

Wilson and Dryburgh would later move to Ireland. In 2004 Wilson skipped the Irish team at the European Championships finishing twelfth. The following year Dryburgh joined the team and skipped them and they finished in seventh qualifying them for the 2006 World Men's Curling Championship at the Worlds Ireland finished in last place.

== Awards ==
- WJCC Sportsmanship Award – 1981
