= Stig-Arne Gunnestad =

Norwegian curler and Olympic medalist

Medal record

Representing Norway

Men's Curling

Olympic Games
Silver medal – second place	1992 Albertville (demonstration)	Team
Bronze medal – third place	1998 Nagano	Team

Stig-Arne Gunnestad (born 12 February 1962) is a Norwegian curler and Olympic medalist. He received a bronze medal at the 1998 Winter Olympics in Nagano.

He was part of the team that finished second at the 1992 Winter Olympics where curling was a demonstration sport.
