= 1992 European Curling Championships =

- Host city: Perth, Scotland
- Arena: Dewars Rink
- Dates: 7–12 December
- Men's winner: Germany
- Curling club: EV Füssen, Füssen
- Skip: Andy Kapp
- Third: Uli Kapp
- Second: Michael Schäffer
- Lead: Oliver Axnick
- Alternate: Holger Höhne
- Finalist: Sweden
- Women's winner: Sweden
- Curling club: Umeå CK, Umeå
- Skip: Elisabet Johansson
- Third: Katarina Nyberg
- Second: Louise Marmont
- Lead: Elisabeth Persson
- Finalist: Scotland

The 1992 European Curling Championships were held from 7 to 12 December at Dewars Rink in Perth, Scotland.

Germany's Andy Kapp rink won that country's third European championship, and the first of two in his career. On the women's side, Team Elisabet Johansson (later Gustafson) won Sweden's eighth championship and the first of four titles for her in her career.

== Men's ==
=== A Tournament ===
==== Group A ====
Team	Skip	W	L
Germany	Andy Kapp	5	1
Switzerland	Urs Dick	4	2
France	Claude Feige	3	3
Scotland	David Smith	3	3
Sweden	Per Carlsén	3	3
Finland	Tomi Rantamäki	2	4
England	Alistair Burns	1	5

=== Tiebreakers ===
- Sweden 8-2 Scotland
- Scotland 7-6 France

=== Playoffs ===
Semifinal
1	Germany	3
4	Scotland	2
2	Switzerland	3
3	Sweden	9

Final
1	Germany	4
3	Sweden	3

== Women's ==
=== Group A ===
Team	Skip	W	L
Germany	Andrea Schöpp	5	1
Norway	Trine Trulsen	4	2
Sweden	Elisabet Johansson	4	2
Scotland	Kirsty Hay	3	3
Finland	Jaana Jokela	3	3
Switzerland	Marianne Flotron	2	4
Denmark	Helena Blach	0	6

=== Tiebreaker ===
- Scotland 9-2 Finland

=== Playoffs ===
Semifinal
1	Germany	7
4	Scotland	9
2	Norway	6
3	Sweden	8

Final
4	Scotland	3
3	Sweden	9
