= Roger McIntyre =

Scottish curler and Olympian

Roger McIntyre is a retired Scottish curler who was on a European Curling Championships winning team. His career spanned from 1981 to 1995.
