= Curtis Fish =

American curler

- Curler

Team
- Curling club: Granite CC, Seattle, Washington

Curling career
- Member Association: United States
- World Championship: 1 (1989)
- Other appearances: World Junior Championships: 1 (1978)
Medal record
Curling
United States Men's Championship
Gold medal – first place	1989 Detroit

Curtis "Curt" Fish is an American curler and 1989 national champion from Seattle, Washington.

== Curling career ==
In 1978, Fish on Jeff Tomlinson's team won US Juniors and placed fifth on Junior Worlds. In 1989 Fish played third on Jim Vukich's team, winning the US Men's Championship and placing tenth at World's.

== Teams ==
Season	Skip	Third	Second	Lead	Alternate	Events
1977–78	Jeff Tomlinson	Ted Purvis	Curtis Fish	Marc McCartney		1989 USJCC (gold); 1978 WJCC (5th)
1988–89	Jim Vukich	Curtis Fish	Bard Nordlund	Jim Pleasants	Jason Larway	1989 USMCC (gold); 1989 WMCC (10th)
1999–00	Tom Violette	Curt Fish	Bard Nordlund	Murphy Tomlinson	Doug Jones	2000 USMCC (??? th)
