= Studer (surname) =

Studer is a Swiss surname. Notable people with the surname include:

- Bernhard Studer (1794–1887), Swiss geologist
- Bernhard Studer (painter) (1832–1868), Swiss painter
- Cheryl Studer (born 1955), American operatic soprano
- Emil Studer (born 1914, date of death unknown), Swiss gymnast
- Frédéric Studer (1926–2005), Swiss painter
- Gottlieb Samuel Studer (1804–1890), Swiss mountaineer
- Irvin Studer (1900–1970), Canadian politician
- Jacob Henry Studer (1840–1904), American printer, lithographer, painter, ornithologist
- Jürg Studer (born 1966), Swiss football defender
- Jürg Studer (curler), Swiss curler in the 1980s
- María Isabel Studer Noguez, Mexican academic in international relations, active since the 1990s
- Nicole Studer (born 1996), Swiss association football player
- Noël Studer (born 1996), Swiss chess grandmaster
- Quint Studer (born 1951), American health care consultant and philanthropist
- Robert Studer (1912–?), Swiss field handball player
- Rudi Studer (born 1951), German computer scientist
- Samuel Emanuel Studer (1757–1834), Swiss malacologist
- Sandra Studer (born 1969), Swiss singer who represented Switzerland in Eurovision Song Contest 1991 under the stage name of Sandra Simó
- Sascha Studer (born 1991), Swiss football goalkeeper
- Stefan Studer (born 1964), German football player
- Stephan Studer (born 1975), Swiss football referee
- Théophile Rudolphe Studer (1845–1922), Swiss ornithologist and marine biologist
- Therese Studer (1862-1931), German labour activist
- Urs Studer, Swiss curler in the 1980s
- Urs Studer (1944–2023), Swiss surgeon and urologist, developer of the "Studer pouch" for replacing diseased or injured bladders
- Willi Studer (1912–1996), Swiss founder of the companies Revox and Studer
