= Peder Flemström =

Swedish male curler

- Curler ♂
- Born: 18 February 1963 (age 63)

Team
- Curling club: Örnsköldsviks CK, Örnsköldsvik

Curling career
- Member Association: Sweden
- World Championship: 1 (1990)
Medal record
Curling
World Championships
Bronze medal – third place	1990 Västerås

Peder Flemström (born 18 February 1963) is a Swedish curler.

He is a 1990 World men's bronze medallist.

== Teams ==
Season	Skip	Third	Second	Lead	Alternate	Coach	Events
1989–90	Lars-Åke Nordström	Christer Ödling	Peder Flemström	Peter Nenzén	Anders Gidlund	Stefan Hasselborg	WCC 1990 (bronze)
