= Christer Ödling =

Swedish curler & coach (born 1962)

- Curler ♂
- Born: 29 July 1962 (age 64)

Team
- Curling club: Örnsköldsviks CK, Örnsköldsvik

Curling career
- Member Association: Sweden
- World Championship: 1 (1990)
Medal record
Curling
World Championships
Bronze medal – third place	1990 Västerås

Christer Ödling (born 29 July 1962) is a Swedish curler.

He is a 1990 World men's bronze medallist.

== Teams ==
Season	Skip	Third	Second	Lead	Alternate	Coach	Events
1989–90	Lars-Åke Nordström	Christer Ödling	Peder Flemström	Peter Nenzén	Anders Gidlund	Stefan Hasselborg	WCC 1990 (bronze)
2011–12	Magnus Domeij (fourth)	Christer Ödling (skip)	Wolger Johansson	Lars-Åke Andersson	Hans Öberg		
2014–15	Christer Ödling	Hans Öberg	Wolger Johansson	Lars-Åke Andersson	Per-Arne Andersson		SSCC 2015 (5th)
2015–16	Christer Ödling	Hans Öberg	Wolger Johansson	Lars-Åke Andersson			SSCC 2016 (???th)
2018–19	Hans Öberg	Lars-Åke Andersson	Kjell-Arne Olsson	Christer Ödling			SSCC 2019 (???th)
2019–20	Christer Ödling	Magnus Domeij	Hans Öberg	Lars-Åke Andersson	Wilmer Öberg		
