= Aufdenblatten =

Aufdenblatten is a surname:

- Alex Aufdenblatten, former Swiss curler
- Alfred Aufdenblatten (1897–1975), Swiss mountaineer, ski guide and cross country skier
- Fränzi Aufdenblatten (born 1962), retired Swiss World Cup alpine ski racer
