= Bob Cowan (curler) =

Scottish male curler and curling historian

- Curler ♂
- Other names: Robert A. Cowan
- Born: c. 1947 (age 78–79)

Team
- Curling club: Magnum CC, Irvine

Curling career
- Member Association: Scotland
- World Championship: 1 (1983)
Medal record
Curling
Scottish Men's Championship
Gold medal – first place	1983

Robert A. Cowan (born c. 1947) is a Scottish curler, journalist, curling historian, blogger.

At the national level, he is a 1983 Scottish men's champion curler.

He is the co-founder of The Curling History Blog (co-founded in 2008 with David B. Smith), one of the main sources about curling history (mainly in Scotland, the United Kingdom, and Europe). He is the author of several books about curling history.

At the time of the 1983 World Championships he was a part-time sports writer for the Glasgow Herald and a lecturer in clinical biochemistry at the University of Glasgow.

== Teams ==
=== Men's ===
Season	Skip	Third	Second	Lead	Events
1980–81	Graeme P. Adam	Ken J. Horton	Robert A. Cowan	Robin J. Copland	EdInt 1981 (gold)
1981–82	Graeme P. Adam	Ken J. Horton	Andrew McQuistin	Robert A. Cowan	EdInt 1982 (gold)
1982–83	Graeme Adam	Ken Horton	Andrew McQuistin	Bob Cowan	SMCC 1983 (gold); WCC 1983 (5th)

=== Mixed ===
Season	Skip	Third	Second	Lead	Events	
1979–80	Graeme Adam	Kerr Graham	Carolyn Hibberd	Bob Cowan	Alison Brown	SMxCC 1980 (silver)
