= Jerry van Brunt Jr. =

American curler

- Curler ♂
- Born: c. 1959

Team
- Curling club: Broadmoor CC, Colorado Springs, CO

Curling career
- Member Association: United States
- World Championship: 1 (1983)
Medal record
Curling
United States Men's Championship
Gold medal – first place	1983 Colorado Springs

Jerry van Brunt Jr. (born c. 1959) is an American curler.

Van Brunt as third for Don Cooper team won the United States men's curling championship in 1983, defeating Bud Somerville in the final. His father, Jerry van Brunt Sr. was the coach of the team.

== Teams ==
Season	Skip	Third	Second	Lead	Events
1982–83	Don Cooper	Jerry van Brunt Jr.	Billy Shipstad	Jack McNelly	USMCC 1983 (gold); WCC 1983 (6th)
2010–11	Jerry van Brunt Jr.	Jim Hideman	Brett Gleeson	Brock Gleeson	
2016–17	Jerry van Brunt Jr.	David Van Brunt	Jon Schiestel	David Brekke	USSCC 2017 (16th)
