= Swiss Mixed Curling Championship =

The Swiss Mixed Curling Championship (German: Mixed Schweizer Meisterschaft, French: Championnat Suisse Mixed) is the national championship of mixed curling (two men and two women) in Switzerland. It has been held annually since 1976 and organized by Swiss Curling Association.

In mixed curling, the positions on a team must alternate between men and women. If a man throws last rocks, which is usually the case, the women must throw lead rocks and third rocks, while the other male member of the team throws second rocks.

== List of champions and medallists ==
The past champions and medalists of the event are listed as follows (in order - fourth/skip, third, second, lead, alternate, skips marked bold):

Year	Host city	Champion (curling club, line-up)	Runner-up	Bronze
1976	Thun	Bern-City-Damen CC; René Steffen, Romy Steffen, Ueli Steck, Silvia Steck		
1977	Lausanne	Montana CC; André Viscolo, Anita Viscolo, Michel Weill, Cathy Perrig		
1978	Zürich	Solothurn-Wengi CC; Bruno Baertschi, Alda Baertschi, Flavio Bigolin, Klara Dick		
1979	Grindelwald	Arosa CC; Denis Schneider, Yvette Wiederkehr, Robert Simmen, Sylvia Studer		
1980	Leukerbad	Arosa CC; Denis Schneider, Yvette Wiederkehr, Robert Simmen, Sylvia Studer		
1981	Flims	Wengen-Inter; Jürg Winkelhausen, Barbara Meyer, Urs Winkelhausen, Erika Müller		
1982	Biel/Bienne	Bern-Wildstrubel; Urs Studer, Brigitte Leutenegger, Jürg Studer, Karin Leutenegger		
1983	Geneva	Genève CC; Urs Bachofne, Anne-C. Burkhalter, Eric Rudolf, Laurence Burkhalter		
1984	Weinfelden	Kloten CC; Beat Stephan, Cristina Wirz, Simon Roth, Irène Bretscher		
1985	Kandersteg	Bern-Neufeld; Walter Bonani, Kathrin Wyssenbach, Fredy Matt, Monika Siegerist		
1986	Gstaad	Zürich-Stadt; Heinz Berger, Beatrice Arnold, Orazio Domeniconi, Daniela Sartori		
1987	Weinfelden	Lausanne-Riviera; Rolf Waldmeier, Jaqueline Landolt, Manfred Winkler, Barbara Schärer		
1988	Kandersteg	Zürich-Stadt; Heinz Berger, Beatrice Arnold, Balz Wyss, Sandra Sartori		
1989	Leukerbad	Gstaad-Sweepers; Stefan Karnusian, Christine Krieg, Traugott Ellenberger, Corina Schindler		
1990	Schlieren	Solothurn-Wengi; Christof Schwaller, Claudia Bärtschi, Robert Hürlimann, Karin Felder		
1991	Adelboden	Uitikon-Waldegg; Jacques Greiner, Brigitte Leutenegger, Stephan Gertsch, Helga Greiner		
1992	Gstaad	Genève CC; Eric Rudolf, Anne-Catherine Crottaz, Laurent Reth, Laurence Panzera		
1993	St. Gallen	Solothurn-Wengi; Urs Dick, Nicole Strausak, Robert Hürlimann, Tatjana Stalder		
1994	Kandersteg	Uitikon-Waldegg; Jacques Greiner, Gisela Peter, Stephan Gertsch, Helga Greiner		
1995	Montana	Uitikon-Waldegg; Thomas Lips, Franziska Gertsch, Dominik Oberwiler, Heide Flammer		
1996	Schaffhausen	Lausanne CC + Ouchy; Bruno Schenkel, Laurence Morisetti, Bernard Cordey, Catherine Schenkel		
1997	Biel/Bienne	Dübendorf; Beat Landolt, Sonja Koch, Ueli Zollinger, Pascale Zenerino		
1998	Gstaad	Dübendorf; Beat Landolt, Sonja Koch, Daniel Lüthi, Pascale Zenerino		
1999	Wetzikon	Kloten CC; Ruedi Tanner, Dorli Pleisch, Thomas Barth, Susanne Affeltranger		
2000	Geneva	Luzern CC; Brigitte Schor, Daniel Lüthi, Karin Oldani, Oliver Maier		
2001	Gstaad	Adelboden; Rudi Hari, Melanie Burn, Simon Dänzer, Andrea Oester		
2002	Wallisellen	Wallisellen CG; Dieter Wüest, Isabelle Wüest, Jens Piesbergen, Corinne Egloff, alternate: Brigitte Fischer		
2003	Weinfelden	Limmattal; Jacques Greiner, Janine Greiner, Daniel Gallati, Fabienne Fürbringe		
2004	Gstaad	Glarus; Jan Hauser, Manuela Kormann, Martin Rios, Petra Feldmann, alternate: Kurt Reichenbach		
2005	Lucerne	Uzwil; Roman Ruch, Karin Baumann, Romano Ruch, Anja Ruch, Niki Goridis		
2006	Biel/Bienne	Glarus; Jan Hauser, Carmen Küng, Andreas Hingher, Petra Feldmann, alternate: Martin Rios	CC Lausanne Olympique 1 Kévin Froidevaux, Emilie Mattille, Eric Meillaud, Sylvie Meillaud	CC Luzern; Daniel Lüthi, Denise Bouquet, Martin Oberholzer, Karin Lüthi-Oldani, alternate: Jeaninne Probst
2007	Urdorf	Uitikon Waldegg; Jacques Greiner, Jacqueline Greiner, Daniel Gallati, Fabienne Frürbringer		
2008	Gstaad	Dübendorf 2 Christian Moser, Franziska Luder, Stefan Luder, Michèle Moser		
2009	Bern	Zug-Foamglas; Daniel Lüthi, Jeannine Probst, Martin Oberholzer, Karin Lüthi, Brigitte Portmann		
2010	Küsnacht	ZH Zürich — Grasshopper; Claudio Pätz, Alina Pätz, Sven Michel, Giola Oechsle, alternate: Nicole Dünki		
2011	Arlesheim	Glarus; Thomas Lips, Manuela Siegrist, Martin Rios, Manuela Netzer-Kormann		
2012	Adelboden	Glarus; Martin Rios, Manuela Siegrist, Romano Meier, Manuela Netzer-Kormann, alternate: Jenny Perret	Biel-Touring; Mike Reid, Michèle Jäggi, Benoît Schwarz, Stéphanie Jäggi, alternate: Dominik Märki	Lausanne Olympique II; Stewart Dryburgh, Isabelle Maillard, Jean-Philippe Suter, Florence Rappo
2013	St. Gallen	Bern 2 Marc Pfister, Carole Howald, Kevin Wunderlin, Nora Baumann	Bern; Paddy Käser, Isabel Kurt, Raphael Märki, Nicole Schwägli	Uzwil; Rolf Bruggmann, Ursi Hegner, Roger Engler, Nina Ledergerber
2014	Adelboden	Glarus; Silvana Tirinzoni, ?, ?, ?	Baden Regio 2 ? Ruch, ?, ?, ?	Uzwil ? Hegner, ?, ?, ?
2015	Gstaad	Bern Gurten; Michael Brunner, Briar Hürlimann, Yannick Schwaller, Céline Koller	Lausanne-Olympique 1 Stewart Drybourgh, Isabelle Maillard, Jean-Philippe Suter, Florence Rappo, alternate: Didier Rappo	Glarus Flyerfox.ch; Martin Rios, Jenny Perret, Romano Meier, Manuela Netzer
2016	Arlesheim			
2017	St. Gallen	Gstaad 1 Michael Brunner, Briar Hürlimann, Yannick Schwaller, Céline Koller	Dübendorf; Marc Pfister, Carole Howald, Kevin Wunderlin, Nora Baumann, coach: Beat Spychiger	Thurgau; Nadja Grunder, Peter Hartmann, Nina Ledergerber, Raphael Michel
2018	Interlaken	Limmattal; Mario Freiberger, Irene Schori, Sven Iten, Cornelia Freiberger	Bern Zähringer; Michael Brunner, Briar Hürlimann, Yannick Schwaller, Céline Koller, alternate: Raymond Krenger	St. Gallen Bär; Reto Gribi, Michelle Gribi, Simon Biedermann, Adonia Brunner, alternate: Jenny Perret
2019	Geneva	Glarus; Martin Rios, Jenny Perret, Romano Meier, Manuela Siegrist	Limmattal; Mario Freiberger, Irene Schori, Sven Iten, Cornelia Freiberger	Biel-Bienne Touring; Mike Reid, Aline Fellmann, Matthias Perret, Michelle Gribi, alternate: Vera Reid-Heuer
2020	Adelboden	Zug-Uzwil; Yves Hess, Ursi Hegner, Michael Müller, Claudia Baumann	Wetzikon; Marina Hauser, Etienne Lottenbach, Valérie Lutz, Ivan Berner	St. Gallen Bär; Jana Stritt, Simon Biedermann, Adonia Brunner, Raymond Krenger, alternate: Reto Keller
2021	not held			
2022	Gstaad	Zug-Uzwil; Yves Hess, Ursi Hegner, Simon Hoehn, Chantal Schmid	Zug; Daniel Lüthi, Cindy Schmid, Martin Risi, Karin Lüthi	Wetzikon; Marina Hauser, Ivan Berner, Valérie Lutz, Michael Hauser
2023	Küssnacht	Zug-Uzwil; Yves Hess, Ursula Hegner, Simon Hoehn, Claudia Baumann	Bern; Melanie Schnider, Paddy Käser, Mirjam Ott, Michael Probst, coach: Chahan Karnusian	Bern Capitals; Jana Stritt, Simon Biedermann, Raymond Krenger, Adonia Brunner
2024	Gstaad	Wallisellen; Yves Wagenseil, Nora Wüest, Dieter Wüest, Marion Wüest	Limmattal 1 Mario Freiberger, Irene Schori, Sven Iten, Cornelia Freiberger, coach: Christian Frösch	Zug; Daniel Lüthi, Cindy Schmid, Martin Risi, Karin Lüthi
2025	St. Gallen	Wallisellen; Yves Wagenseil, Nora Wüest, Dieter Wüest, Marion Wüest	Bern Capitals; Jana Stritt, Marcel Käufeler, Adonia Brunner, Raymond Krenger, alternate: Beat Brunner	St. Gallen; Meico Oehninger, Laura Engler, Lukas Würmli, Andrea Stuber
2026	Aarau	Luzern; Lukas Christen, Selin Brauchli, Martin Risi, Cindy Schmid, coach: Nicole Dünki	Genève; Grégory Renggli, Camille Crottaz, Pascal Jaquet, Michelle Borner Jaquet	Wallisellen; Yves Wagenseil, Nora Wüest, Dieter Wüest, Marion Wüest, Elena Fischer

== See also ==
- Swiss Men's Curling Championship
- Swiss Women's Curling Championship
- Swiss Mixed Doubles Curling Championship
- Swiss Junior Curling Championships
- Swiss Junior Mixed Doubles Curling Championship
- Swiss Senior Curling Championships
- Swiss Wheelchair Curling Championship
