= 1983 European Curling Championships =

Curling Championships

- Host city: Västerås, Sweden
- Arena: Rocklundahallen
- Dates: 4–10 December
- Men's winner: Switzerland
- Skip: Amédéé Biner
- Third: Walter Bielser
- Second: Alex Aufdenblatten
- Lead: Alfred Paci
- Finalist: Norway (Kristian Sørum)
- Women's winner: Sweden
- Curling club: Karlstads CK, Karlstad
- Skip: Elisabeth Högström
- Third: Katarina Hultling
- Second: Birgitta Sewik
- Lead: Karin Sjögren
- Finalist: Norway (Trine Trulsen)

The 1983 European Curling Championships were held from 4 to 10 December at the Rocklundahallen arena in Västerås, Sweden.

The Swiss men's team skipped by Amédéé Biner won their fourth European title, and the Swedish women's team skipped by Elisabeth Högström won their sixth European title.

For the first time, the women's team of Finland took part in the European Championship.

== Men's ==
=== Teams ===
Team	Skip	Third	Second	Lead	Curling club
Austria	Jakob Küchl	Günther Mochny	Alois Kreidl	Konrad Weiser	
Denmark	Frants Gufler	Hans Gufler	Michael Sindt	Holger Slotsager	
England	Ronnie Brock	John Brown	Ian Coutts	Duncan Stewart	
Finland	Pekka Kouvo	Seppo Hietala	Timo Korhonen	Kai Pahl	
France	Henri Müller	René Robert	Fernand Schillinger	Claude Groff	
Germany	Keith Wendorf	Hans Dieter Kiesel	Sven Saile	Heiner Martin	CC Schwenningen, Schwenningen
Italy	Andrea Pavani	Franco Sovilla	Giancarlo Valt	Stefano Morona	
Luxembourg	Nico Schweich	William Bannerman	Gisbert Franz	Georges Schweich	
Netherlands	Wim Neeleman	Robert van der Cammen	Gustaf van Imhoff	Jeroen Tilman	
Norway	Kristian Sørum	Morten Søgaard	Dagfinn Loen	Morten Skaug	
Scotland	Mike Hay	David Hay	David Smith	Russell Keiller	
Sweden	Inge Granback	Mats Svedberg	Lars Carlsson	Thomas Brinkeborn	Aroscurlarna, Västerås
Switzerland	Amédéé Biner	Walter Bielser	Alex Aufdenblatten	Alfred Paci	
Wales	John Hunt	John Stone	Peter Williams	Ray King	

=== Round robin ===
Group A

	Team	A1	A2	A3	A4	A5	A6	A7	W	L	Place
A1	Denmark	*	13:3	7:5	6:3	3:10	3:8	7:5	4	2	3
A2	England	3:13	*	5:7	8:6	2:8	5:8	6:7	1	5	7
A3	France	5:7	7:5	*	9:2	2:6	3:10	3:4	2	4	4
A4	Italy	3:6	6:8	2:9	*	7:4	4:5	7:3	2	4	5
A5	Scotland	10:3	8:2	6:2	4:7	*	8:3	5:2	5	1	1
A6	Sweden	8:3	8:5	10:3	5:4	3:8	*	11:3	5	1	2
A7	Wales	5:7	7:6	4:3	3:7	2:5	3:11	*	2	4	6

Group B

	Team	B1	B2	B3	B4	B5	B6	B7	W	L	Place
B1	Austria	*	3:6	2:13	11:2	0:6	5:11	3:8	1	5	6
B2	Finland	6:3	*	3:10	6:9	4:8	2:7	5:7	1	5	5
B3	Germany	13:2	10:3	*	11:4	5:3	2:3	2:8	4	2	3
B4	Luxembourg	2:11	9:6	4:11	*	4:9	1:12	3:11	1	5	7
B5	Netherlands	6:0	8:4	3:5	9:4	*	2:6	4:7	3	3	4
B6	Norway	11:5	7:2	3:2	12:1	6:2	*	8:6	6	0	1
B7	Switzerland	8:3	7:5	8:2	11:3	7:4	6:8	*	5	1	2

Teams to playoffs

=== Ranking games for 5th-14th places ===
For 13th place
England	5
Luxembourg	4

For 11th place
Wales	5
Austria	4

For 9th place
Italy	8
Finland	2

For 7th place
France	6
Netherlands	8

For 5th place
Denmark	3
Germany	6

=== Playoffs ===
Semifinals
A(1)	Scotland	4
B(2)	Switzerland	5
B(1)	Norway	6
A(2)	Sweden	4

Final
Switzerland	11
Norway	2
Bronze game
Scotland	8
Sweden	3

=== Final standings ===
Place	Team	Skip	GP	W	L
1st place, gold medalist(s)	Switzerland	Amédéé Biner	8	7	1
2nd place, silver medalist(s)	Norway	Kristian Sørum	8	7	1
3rd place, bronze medalist(s)	Scotland	Mike Hay	8	6	2
4	Sweden	Inge Granback	8	5	3
5	Germany	Keith Wendorf	7	5	2
6	Denmark	Frants Gufler	7	4	3
7	Netherlands	Wim Neeleman	7	4	3
8	France	Henri Müller	7	2	5
9	Italy	Andrea Pavani	7	3	4
10	Finland	Pekka Kouvo	7	1	6
11	Wales	John Hunt	7	3	4
12	Austria	Jakob Küchl	7	1	6
13	England	Ronnie Brock	7	2	5
14	Luxembourg	Nico Schweich	7	1	6

== Women's ==
=== Teams ===
Team	Skip	Third	Second	Lead	Curling club
Austria	Edeltraud Koudelka	Christl Naegle	Monika Hölzl	Herta Kuchenmeister	
Denmark	Helena Blach	Jette Olsen	Malene Krause	Lone Kristoffersen	Hvidovre CC, Hvidovre
England	Gwen French	Jean Picken	Mary Finlay	June Henry	
Finland	Anne Eerikäinen	Sirpa Piiroinen	Terhi Aro	Marita Ripatti	
France	Huguette Jullien (fourth)	Agnes Mercier	Monique Tournier	Paulette Sulpice (skip)	
Germany	Andrea Schöpp	Monika Wagner	Anneliese Diemer	Elinore Schöpp	
Italy	Maria-Grazzia Constantini	Tea Valt	Nella Alvera	Angela Constantini	
Luxembourg	Cilly Schweich	Madeleine van den Houten	Pat Bannerman	Marie Garritze	
Netherlands	Laura Van Imhoff	Gerrie Veening	Kniertje van Kuyk	Hanneke Veening	
Norway	Trine Trulsen	Dordi Nordby	Hanne Pettersen	Anne Gotteberg	
Scotland	Isobel Torrance Jr	Margaret Craig	Jackie Steele	Sheila Harvey	
Sweden	Elisabeth Högström	Katarina Hultling	Birgitta Sewik	Karin Sjögren	Karlstads CK, Karlstad
Switzerland	Erika Müller	Barbara Meyer	Barbara Meier	Cristina Wirz	Bern Egghölzi Damen CC, Bern
Wales	Elizabeth Hunt	Anne Stone	Helen Lyon	Jean Robinson	

=== Round robin ===
Group A

	Team	A1	A2	A3	A4	A5	A6	A7	W	L	Place
A1	Austria	*	6:7	4:12	5:8	5:12	2:14	8:5	1	5	7
A2	France	7:6	*	10:5	10:3	7:2	4:8	8:3	5	1	1
A3	Germany	12:4	5:10	*	13:3	5:8	3:4	8:4	3	3	4
A4	Luxembourg	8:5	3:10	3:13	*	5:12	2:12	6:8	1	5	6
A5	Norway	12:5	2:7	8:5	12:5	*	15:3	7:1	5	1	1
A6	Sweden	14:2	8:4	4:3	12:2	3:15	*	11:4	5	1	1
A7	Wales	5:8	3:8	4:8	8:6	1:7	4:11	*	1	5	5

Group B

	Team	B1	B2	B3	B4	B5	B6	B7	W	L	Place
B1	Denmark	*	12:4	10:6	11:1	8:9	2:10	4:7	3	3	4
B2	England	4:12	*	13:3	3:15	10:12	2:12	5:16	1	5	6
B3	Finland	6:10	3:13	*	6:12	4:13	2:19	3:10	0	6	7
B4	Italy	1:11	15:3	12:6	*	8:9	5:7	10:11	2	4	5
B5	Netherlands	9:8	12:10	13:4	9:8	*	2:9	5:8	4	2	3
B6	Scotland	10:2	12:2	19:2	7:5	9:2	*	6:2	6	0	1
B7	Switzerland	7:4	16:5	10:3	11:10	8:5	2:6	*	5	1	2

Teams to playoffs
Teams to tiebreaker

=== Tiebreaker ===
Round 1 (winner to playoffs as 1st place)		Round 2 (winner to playoffs as 2nd place)
Norway	6
Sweden	4	Sweden	4
		France	3

=== Ranking games for 5th-14th places ===
For 13th place
Austria	5
Finland	8

For 11th place
Luxembourg	13
England	6

For 9th place
Wales	4
Italy	7

For 7th place
Germany	5
Denmark	3

For 5th place
France	6
Netherlands	8

=== Playoffs ===
Semifinals
A(1)	Norway	7
B(2)	Switzerland	3
B(1)	Scotland	3
A(2)	Sweden	9

Final
Norway	3
Sweden	4
Bronze game
Switzerland	7
Scotland	6

=== Final standings ===
Place	Team	Skip	GP	W	L
1st place, gold medalist(s)	Sweden	Elisabeth Högström	10	8	2
2nd place, silver medalist(s)	Norway	Trine Trulsen	9	7	2
3rd place, bronze medalist(s)	Switzerland	Erika Müller	8	6	2
4	Scotland	Isobel Torrance Jr	8	6	2
5	Netherlands	Laura Van Imhoff	7	5	2
6	France	Paulette Sulpice	8	5	3
7	Germany	Andrea Schöpp	7	4	3
8	Denmark	Helena Blach	7	3	4
9	Italy	Maria-Grazzia Constantini	7	3	4
10	Wales	Elizabeth Hunt	7	1	6
11	Luxembourg	Cilly Schweich	7	2	5
12	England	Gwen French	7	1	6
13	Finland	Anne Eerikäinen	7	1	6
14	Austria	Edeltraud Koudelka	7	1	6
