= Lars-Åke Nordström =

Swedish male curler and coach

- Curler ♂
- Other names: Larsa
- Born: 23 July 1960
- Died: 26 February 2009 (aged 48)

Team
- Curling club: Örnsköldsviks CK, Örnsköldsvik, Östersunds CK, Östersund

Curling career
- Member Association: Sweden
- World Championship: 3 (1990, 1992, 1996)
- European Championship: 3 (1991, 1994, 1996)
Medal record
Curling
World Championships
Bronze medal – third place	1990 Västerås
European Championships
Silver medal – second place	1996 Copenhagen
Bronze medal – third place	1994 Sundsvall
Swedish Men's Championship
Gold medal – first place	1996
Gold medal – first place	2004 (?)

Lars-Åke "Larsa" Nordström (23 July 1960 – 26 February 2009) was a Swedish curler and curling coach.

He was a 1990 World men's bronze medallist.

He participated on 2006 Winter Olympics as a coach of Swedish men's curling team.

In 1998 he was inducted into the Swedish Curling Hall of Fame.

== Teams ==
=== Men's ===
Season	Skip	Third	Second	Lead	Alternate	Coach	Events
1989–90	Lars-Åke Nordström	Christer Ödling	Peder Flemström	Peter Nenzén	Anders Gidlund	Stefan Hasselborg	WCC 1990 (bronze)
1991–92	Per Hedén	Jan Strandlund	Kenneth Rydén	Jan Lundblad	Lars-Åke Nordström		ECC 1991 (4th)
1991–92	Mikael Hasselborg	Hans Nordin	Lars Vågberg	Stefan Hasselborg	Lars-Åke Nordström		WCC 1992 (7th)
1994–95	Mikael Hasselborg	Hans Nordin	Lars Vågberg	Stefan Hasselborg	Lars-Åke Nordström		ECC 1994 (bronze)
1995–96	Lars-Åke Nordström	Jan Strandlund	Örjan Jonsson	Owe Ljungdahl			SMCC 1996 (gold)
1995–96	Mikael Hasselborg	Stefan Hasselborg	Hans Nordin	Peter Eriksson	Lars-Åke Nordström		WCC 1996 (5th)
1996–97	Lars-Åke Nordström	Jan Strandlund	Örjan Jonsson	Owe Ljungdahl	Hans Nordin	Stefan Hasselborg	ECC 1996 (silver)

=== Mixed ===
Season	Skip	Third	Second	Lead	Events
1998	Lars-Åke Nordström	Katarina Öberg	Hans Öberg	Cilla Ingelsson	SMxCC 1998 (gold)

== Record as a coach of national teams ==
Year	Tournament, event	National team	Place
2000	2000 World Junior Curling Championships	Sweden (junior women)	1st place, gold medalist(s)
2001	2001 World Junior Curling Championships	Sweden (junior women)	2nd place, silver medalist(s)
2002	2002 World Junior Curling Championships	Sweden (junior women)	2nd place, silver medalist(s)
2002	2002 European Curling Championships	Sweden (men)	2nd place, silver medalist(s)
2003	2003 European Curling Championships	Sweden (men)	2nd place, silver medalist(s)
2004	2004 World Men's Curling Championship	Sweden (men)	1st place, gold medalist(s)
2004	2004 European Curling Championships	Sweden (men)	2nd place, silver medalist(s)
2005	2005 European Curling Championships	Sweden (men)	2nd place, silver medalist(s)
2006	2006 Winter Olympics	Sweden (men)	8
