= John Jahant =

American male curler

- Curler ♂
- Born: April 4, 1959
- Died: May 19, 2010 (aged 51); Chicago, Illinois, U.S.

Team
- Curling club: Wilmette CC, Wilmette

Curling career
- Member Association: United States
- World Championship: 1 (1985)
Medal record
Curling
United States Men's Championship
Gold medal – first place	1985 Mequon

John Pierre Jahant (April 4, 1959 – May 19, 2010) was an American curler.

At the national level, he was a 1985 United States men's curling champion curler.

== Teams ==
Season	Skip	Third	Second	Lead	Events
1974–75	Tim Wright	John Jahant	Steven Wolfe	Timothy Tubekit	USJCC 1975 (???th)
1977–78	John Jahant	Grayland Cousins	Joseph Cousins	Russell Lissuzzo	USJCC 1978 (???th)
1978–79	John Jahant	Grayland Cousins	Joseph Cousins	Russell Lissuzzo	USJCC 1979 (???th)
1984–85	Tim Wright	John Jahant	Jim Wilson	Russ Armstrong	USMCC 1985 (gold); WCC 1985 (4th)
1990–91	Tim Wright	John Jahant	James C. Wilson	Richard Maskel	USMCC 1991 (5th)
