= Mike Grennan =

American curler

- Curler
- Born: November 29, 1950
- Died: May 12, 2009 (aged 58)

Team
- Curling club: Granite Curling Club (Seattle)

Curling career
- Member Association: United States
- World Championship: 1 (1988)
Medal record
Curling
United States Men's Championship
Gold medal – first place	1988 St. Paul

Mike Grennan (November 29, 1950 - May 12, 2009) was an American curler and 1988 national men's champion.

== Curling career ==
In 1988 Grennan played lead on Doug Jones' national champion team; they went on to finish in tenth place at the World Championship.

== Teams ==
Season	Skip	Third	Second	Lead	Events
1987–88	Doug Jones	Bard Nordlund	Murphy Tomlinson	Mike Grennan	1988 USMCC (gold); 1988 WMCC (10th)
