= Hans Nordin (curler) =

Swedish male curler

- Curler ♂
- Born: 13 July 1959 (age 67)

Team
- Curling club: Sollefteå CK, Sollefteå

Curling career
- Member Association: Sweden
- World Championship: 5 (1983, 1985, 1986, 1992, 1996)
- European Championship: 3 (1990, 1994, 1996)
Medal record
Curling
World Championships
Silver medal – second place	1985 Glasgow
European Championships
Gold medal – first place	1990 Lillehammer
Silver medal – second place	1996 Copenhagen
Bronze medal – third place	1994 Sundsvall
Swedish Men's Championship
Gold medal – first place	1990
Gold medal – first place	1994

Hans Nordin (born 13 July 1959) is a Swedish curler and curling coach.

He is a 1990 European champion and 1985 World championship silver medallist.

In 1990, he was inducted into the Swedish Curling Hall of Fame.

== Teams ==
Season	Skip	Third	Second	Lead	Alternate	Coach	Events
1982–83	Stefan Hasselborg	Mikael Hasselborg	Hans Nordin	Lars Wernblom			WCC 1983 (4th)
1984–85	Stefan Hasselborg	Mikael Hasselborg	Hans Nordin	Lars Wernblom			WCC 1985 (silver)
1985–86	Stefan Hasselborg	Mikael Hasselborg	Hans Nordin	Lars Wernblom			WCC 1986 (4th)
1989–90	Mikael Hasselborg	Hans Nordin	Lars Vågberg	Stefan Hasselborg			SMCC 1990 (gold)
1990–91	Mikael Hasselborg	Hans Nordin	Lars Vågberg	Stefan Hasselborg			ECC 1990 (gold)
1991–92	Mikael Hasselborg	Hans Nordin	Lars Vågberg	Stefan Hasselborg	Lars-Åke Nordström (WCC)		WCC 1992 (7th)
1993–94	Mikael Hasselborg	Hans Nordin	Lars Vågberg	Stefan Hasselborg			SMCC 1994 (gold)
1994–95	Mikael Hasselborg	Hans Nordin	Lars Vågberg	Stefan Hasselborg	Lars-Åke Nordström (ECC)		ECC 1994 (bronze)
1995–96	Mikael Hasselborg	Stefan Hasselborg	Hans Nordin	Peter Eriksson	Lars-Åke Nordström (WCC)		WCC 1996 (5th)
1996–97	Lars-Åke Nordström	Jan Strandlund	Örjan Jonsson	Owe Ljungdahl	Hans Nordin	Stefan Hasselborg	ECC 1996 (silver)
