= Gisela Peter =

Swiss curler

- Curler ♀

Team
- Curling club: Winterthur CC, Winterthur, Uitikon-Wald CC, Uitikon-Waldegg

Curling career
- Member Association: Switzerland
- World Championship: 2 (1987, 1990)
- European Championship: 1 (1991)
- Other appearances: European Junior Championships: 1 (1986)
Medal record
Curling
World Championships
Bronze medal – third place	1987 Chicago
Swiss Women's Championship
Gold medal – first place	1987
Gold medal – first place	1990

Gisela Peter is a former Swiss curler.

At the international level, she is a 1987 World women's bronze medallist.

At the national level, she is a two-time Swiss women's champion curler (1987, 1990), a Swiss mixed champion curler (1994) and a Swiss Junior champion curler (1986).

== Teams ==
=== Women's ===
Season	Skip	Third	Second	Lead	Alternate	Events
1985–86	Marianne Flotron	Sandra Burkhard	Beatrice Frei	Gisela Peter		SJCC 1986 (gold); EJCC 1986 (gold)
1986–87	Marianne Flotron	Gisela Peter	Beatrice Frei	Caroline Rück		SWCC 1987 (gold); WCC 1987 (bronze)
1989–90	Brigitte Leutenegger	Gisela Peter	Marianne Gutknecht	Karin Leutenegger		SWCC 1990 (gold); WCC 1990 (7th)
1991–92	Brigitte Leutenegger	Gisela Peter	Karin Leutenegger	Helga Greiner	Susanne Geissbühler	ECC 1991 (6th)

=== Mixed ===
Season	Skip	Third	Second	Lead	Events
1993–94	Jacques Greiner	Gisela Peter	Stephan Gertsch	Helga Greiner	SMxCC 1994 (gold)
