= Tim Wright (curler) =

American male curler

- Curler ♂

Team
- Curling club: Wilmette CC, Wilmette, Duluth CC, Duluth

Curling career
- Member Association: United States
- World Championship: 1 (1985)
Medal record
Curling
United States Men's Championship
Gold medal – first place	1985 Mequon

Timothy S. Wright is an American curler from Prospect Heights, Illinois.

At the national level, he is a 1985 United States men's curling champion curler and 2001 United States mixed silver medallist.

== Awards ==
- Collie Campbell Memorial Award (1985)

== Teams ==
=== Men's ===
Season	Skip	Third	Second	Lead	Events
1974–75	Tim Wright	John Jahant	Steven Wolfe	Timothy Tubekit	USJCC 1975 (???th)
1976–77	Tim Wright	?	?	?	USJCC 1977 (???th)
1984–85	Tim Wright	John Jahant	Jim Wilson	Russ Armstrong	USMCC 1985 (gold); WCC 1985 (4th)
1990–91	Tim Wright	John Jahant	Jim Wilson	Richard Maskel	USMCC 1991 (5th)
1991–92	Tim Wright	James C. Wilson	Gregory Gallagher	Russell H. Armstrong	USMCC 1992 (???th)
1998–99	Tim Wright	Paul Hanke	Brad Casper	Tim Paterson	
2001–02	Tim Wright	?	?	?	
2002–03	Tim Wright	?	?	?	
2003–04	Todd Malpass	Tim Wright	Chris Rugg	Bob Johnanson	
2004–05	Tim Wright	Todd Malpass	Rob Thomas	Dusty Jakomait	
2005–06	Tim Wright	Andy Jukich	Chris Rugg	Bob Johnanson	
2006–07	Tim Wright	?	?	?	
2007–08	Tim Wright	Craig Brown	Mike Thompson	Michael Rane	

=== Mixed ===
Season	Skip	Third	Second	Lead	Events
1988–89	Tim Wright	Amy Hatten	Russell H. Armstrong	—	USMxCC 1989 (???th)
2000–01	Tim Wright	Amy Wright	Ryan Larson	Amy Becher	USMxCC 2001 (silver)

== Personal life ==
He is married to fellow curler Amy Wright, US women's champion curler, together they were 2001 US mixed runner-ups.
