= 1985 Air Canada Silver Broom =

- Host city: Glasgow, Scotland
- Arena: Kelvin Hall
- Dates: 25–31 March 1985
- Winner: Canada
- Curling club: Fort William CC, Thunder Bay, Ontario
- Skip: Al Hackner
- Third: Rick Lang
- Second: Ian Tetley
- Lead: Pat Perroud
- Finalist: Sweden (Stefan Hasselborg)

The 1985 Air Canada Silver Broom, the men's world curling championship, was held from 25 to 31 March at the Kelvin Hall in Glasgow, Scotland.

== Teams ==
| Canada | Denmark | England | Germany | Italy |
|---|---|---|---|---|
| Fort William CC, Thunder Bay, Ontario Skip: Al Hackner; Third: Rick Lang; Second: Ian Tetley; Lead: Pat Perroud | Frederiksberg CC Fourth: Hans Gufler; Third: Steen Hansen; Second: Michael Sindt; Skip: Frants Gufler | Province of London CC Skip: Bob Martin; Third: Ronnie Brock; Second: Ian Coutts; Lead: John Brown | CC Schwenningen Skip: Keith Wendorf; Third: Uwe Saile; Second: Sven Saile; Lead: Andreas Sailer | Tofane/Cortina CC, Cortina d'Ampezzo Skip: Andrea Pavani; Third: Franco Sovilla; Second: Giancarlo Valt; Lead: Stefano Morona |
| Norway | Scotland | Sweden | Switzerland | United States |
| Brumunddal CC, Oslo Skip: Kristian Sørum; Third: Morten Søgaard; Second: Morten Skaug; Lead: Dagfinn Loen | Ayr CC Skip: Billy Howat; Third: Robert Clark; Second: Robert Shaw; Lead: Alistair Henry | Sollefteå CK Skip: Stefan Hasselborg; Third: Mikael Hasselborg; Second: Hans Nordin; Lead: Lars Wernblom | Olten CC Skip: Markus Känzig; Third: Silvano Flückiger; Second: Rolf Walser; Lead: Mario Flückiger | Wilmette CC, Illinois Skip: Tim Wright; Third: John Jahant; Second: Jim Wilson; Lead: Russ Armstrong |

== Round robin standings ==
Key
| Teams to playoffs |
| Teams to tiebreaker |

| Country | Skip | W | L |
| Denmark | Frants Gufler | 6 | 3 |
| United States | Tim Wright | 6 | 3 |
| Canada | Al Hackner | 6 | 3 |
| Sweden | Stefan Hasselborg | 5 | 4 |
| Scotland | Billy Howat | 5 | 4 |
| Norway | Kristian Sørum | 5 | 4 |
| Italy | Andrea Pavani | 4 | 5 |
| Switzerland | Markus Känzig | 4 | 5 |
| Germany | Keith Wendorf | 4 | 5 |
| England | Bob Martin | 0 | 9 |

== Round robin results ==
=== Draw 1 ===
| Team | Final |
| Italy (Pavani) | 8 |
| England (Martin) | 6 |

| Team | Final |
| Switzerland (Känzig) | 8 |
| Sweden (Hasselborg) | 7 |

| Team | Final |
| Canada (Hackner) | 6 |
| Scotland (Howat) | 4 |

| Team | Final |
| Norway (Sørum) | 8 |
| United States (Wright) | 4 |

| Team | Final |
| Germany (Wendorf) | 7 |
| Denmark (Gufler) | 6 |

=== Draw 2 ===
| Team | Final |
| Denmark (Gufler) | 9 |
| Switzerland (Känzig) | 2 |

| Team | Final |
| Scotland (Howat) | 5 |
| Germany (Wendorf) | 0 |

| Team | Final |
| United States (Wright) | 13 |
| England (Martin) | 1 |

| Team | Final |
| Canada (Hackner) | 7 |
| Italy (Pavani) | 4 |

| Team | Final |
| Norway (Sørum) | 6 |
| Sweden (Hasselborg) | 0 |

=== Draw 3 ===
| Team | Final |
| Norway (Sørum) | 10 |
| Germany (Wendorf) | 4 |

| Team | Final |
| United States (Wright) | 8 |
| Italy (Pavani) | 3 |

| Team | Final |
| Sweden (Hasselborg) | 6 |
| Denmark (Gufler) | 5 |

| Team | Final |
| Scotland (Howat) | 10 |
| England (Martin) | 3 |

| Team | Final |
| Canada (Hackner) | 8 |
| Switzerland (Känzig) | 7 |

=== Draw 4 ===
| Team | Final |
| Italy (Pavani) | 4 |
| Sweden (Hasselborg) | 3 |

| Team | Final |
| Canada (Hackner) | 10 |
| England (Martin) | 2 |

| Team | Final |
| Germany (Wendorf) | 8 |
| Switzerland (Känzig) | 2 |

| Team | Final |
| Norway (Sørum) | 5 |
| Denmark (Gufler) | 4 |

| Team | Final |
| United States (Wright) | 8 |
| Scotland (Howat) | 4 |

=== Draw 5 ===
| Team | Final |
| Denmark (Gufler) | 6 |
| Canada (Hackner) | 3 |

| Team | Final |
| Sweden (Hasselborg) | 8 |
| Scotland (Howat) | 3 |

| Team | Final |
| Italy (Pavani) | 6 |
| Norway (Sørum) | 2 |

| Team | Final |
| United States (Wright) | 6 |
| Switzerland (Känzig) | 5 |

| Team | Final |
| Germany (Wendorf) | 9 |
| England (Martin) | 8 |

=== Draw 6 ===
| Team | Final |
| Germany (Wendorf) | 5 |
| United States (Wright) | 4 |

| Team | Final |
| Norway (Sørum) | 8 |
| England (Martin) | 6 |

| Team | Final |
| Scotland (Howat) | 5 |
| Switzerland (Känzig) | 4 |

| Team | Final |
| Sweden (Hasselborg) | 6 |
| Canada (Hackner) | 3 |

| Team | Final |
| Denmark (Gufler) | 6 |
| Italy (Pavani) | 4 |

=== Draw 7 ===
| Team | Final |
| Switzerland (Känzig) | 7 |
| England (Martin) | 3 |

| Team | Final |
| Italy (Pavani) | 8 |
| Germany (Wendorf) | 6 |

| Team | Final |
| United States (Wright) | 5 |
| Sweden (Hasselborg) | 4 |

| Team | Final |
| Denmark (Gufler) | 5 |
| Scotland (Howat) | 3 |

| Team | Final |
| Canada (Hackner) | 11 |
| Norway (Sørum) | 6 |

=== Draw 8 ===
| Team | Final |
| Scotland (Howat) | 9 |
| Norway (Sørum) | 8 |

| Team | Final |
| Denmark (Gufler) | 8 |
| United States (Wright) | 6 |

| Team | Final |
| Canada (Hackner) | 5 |
| Germany (Wendorf) | 4 |

| Team | Final |
| Switzerland (Känzig) | 5 |
| Italy (Pavani) | 3 |

| Team | Final |
| Sweden (Hasselborg) | 11 |
| England (Martin) | 6 |

=== Draw 9 ===
| Team | Final |
| United States (Wright) | 7 |
| Canada (Hackner) | 4 |

| Team | Final |
| Switzerland (Känzig) | 6 |
| Norway (Sørum) | 4 |

| Team | Final |
| Denmark (Gufler) | 13 |
| England (Martin) | 7 |

| Team | Final |
| Sweden (Hasselborg) | 9 |
| Germany (Wendorf) | 5 |

| Team | Final |
| Scotland (Howat) | 9 |
| Italy (Pavani) | 3 |

== Tiebreakers ==
=== Round 1 ===
| Team | Final |
| Italy (Pavani) | 3 |
| Switzerland (Känzig) | 2 |

| Team | Final |
| Scotland (Howat) | 7 |
| Norway (Sørum) | 4 |

=== Round 2 ===
| Team | Final |
| Switzerland (Känzig) | 7 |
| Germany (Wendorf) | 5 |

| Team | Final |
| Sweden (Hasselborg) | 8 |
| Scotland (Howat) | 3 |

== Playoffs ==
Semifinals
1 | Denmark | 2
4 | Sweden | 4
2 | United States | 4
3 | Canada | 9

Final
4 | Sweden | 2
3 | Canada | 6

=== Semifinals ===
| Team | Final |
| Sweden (Hasselborg) | 4 |
| Denmark (Gufler) | 2 |

| Team | 1 | 2 | 3 | 4 | 5 | 6 | 7 | 8 | 9 | 10 | Final |
|---|---|---|---|---|---|---|---|---|---|---|---|
| Canada (Hackner) | 1 | 0 | 2 | 2 | 0 | 1 | 0 | 2 | 1 | X | 9 |
| United States (Wright) 🔨 | 0 | 1 | 0 | 0 | 2 | 0 | 1 | 0 | 0 | X | 4 |

=== Final ===
| Team | 1 | 2 | 3 | 4 | 5 | 6 | 7 | 8 | 9 | 10 | Final |
|---|---|---|---|---|---|---|---|---|---|---|---|
| Canada (Hackner) | 0 | 0 | 3 | 0 | 1 | 0 | 1 | 0 | 1 | 0 | 6 |
| Sweden (Hasselborg) | 0 | 1 | 0 | 1 | 0 | 0 | 0 | 0 | 0 | 0 | 2 |

1985 Air Canada Silver Broom
(Canada)
Canada
16th title
