= Mikael Hasselborg =

Swedish male curler and coach

- Curler ♂
- Other names: Micke
- Born: 7 April 1954 (age 72)

Team
- Curling club: Sollefteå CK, Sollefteå

Curling career
- Member Association: Sweden
- World Championship: 5 (1983, 1985, 1986, 1992, 1996)
- European Championship: 2 (1990, 1994)
- World Senior Curling Championship: 5 (2016, 2017, 2018, 2022, 2024)
Medal record
Curling
World Championships
Silver medal – second place	1985 Glasgow
European Championships
Gold medal – first place	1990 Lillehammer
Bronze medal – third place	1994 Sundsvall
World Senior Championships
Gold medal – first place	2016 Karlstad
Gold medal – first place	2017 Lethbridge
Silver medal – second place	2018 Östersund
Bronze medal – third place	2022 Geneva
Bronze medal – third place	2024 Östersund
Swedish Men's Championship
Gold medal – first place	1990
Gold medal – first place	1994

Kurt Mikael "Micke" Hasselborg (born 7 April 1954) is a Swedish curler and curling coach.

He is a 1990 European champion and 1985 World championship silver medallist.

== Awards ==
- Collie Campbell Memorial Award: 1996.
- In 1990 he was inducted into the Swedish Curling Hall of Fame.

== Teams ==
Season	Skip	Third	Second	Lead	Alternate	Coach	Events
1982–83	Stefan Hasselborg	Mikael Hasselborg	Hans Nordin	Lars Wernblom			WCC 1983 (4th)
1984–85	Stefan Hasselborg	Mikael Hasselborg	Hans Nordin	Lars Wernblom			WCC 1985 (silver)
1985–86	Stefan Hasselborg	Mikael Hasselborg	Hans Nordin	Lars Wernblom			WCC 1986 (4th)
1989–90	Mikael Hasselborg	Hans Nordin	Lars Vågberg	Stefan Hasselborg			SMCC 1990 (gold)
1990–91	Mikael Hasselborg	Hans Nordin	Lars Vågberg	Stefan Hasselborg			ECC 1990 (gold)
1991–92	Mikael Hasselborg	Hans Nordin	Lars Vågberg	Stefan Hasselborg	Lars-Åke Nordström (WCC)		WCC 1992 (7th)
1993–94	Mikael Hasselborg	Hans Nordin	Lars Vågberg	Stefan Hasselborg			SMCC 1994 (gold)
1994–95	Mikael Hasselborg	Hans Nordin	Lars Vågberg	Stefan Hasselborg	Lars-Åke Nordström (ECC)		ECC 1994 (bronze)
1995–96	Mikael Hasselborg	Stefan Hasselborg	Hans Nordin	Peter Eriksson	Lars-Åke Nordström (WCC)		WCC 1996 (5th)
2015–16	Mats Wranå	Mikael Hasselborg	Anders Eriksson	Gerry Wahlin	Lars Lindgren		WSCC 2016 (gold)
2016–17	Mats Wranå	Mikael Hasselborg	Anders Eriksson	Gerry Wahlin			WSCC 2017 (gold)
2017–18	Mats Wranå	Mikael Hasselborg	Anders Eriksson	Gerry Wahlin	Mikael Ljungberg	Mikael Ljungberg	WSCC 2018 (silver)

== Record as a coach of national teams ==
Year	Tournament, event	National team	Place
1999	1999 World Women's Curling Championship	Sweden (women)	1st place, gold medalist(s)
2003	2003 World Junior Curling Championships	Sweden (junior men)	2nd place, silver medalist(s)
2005	2005 World Junior Curling Championships	Sweden (junior men)	2nd place, silver medalist(s)
2006	2006 World Junior Curling Championships	Sweden (junior men)	2nd place, silver medalist(s)
2006	2006 World Men's Curling Championship	Sweden (men)	5
2007	2007 World Junior Curling Championships	Sweden (junior men)	2nd place, silver medalist(s)
2009	2009 World Junior Curling Championships	Sweden (junior women)	6
2010	2010 World Junior Curling Championships	Sweden (junior women)	1st place, gold medalist(s)
2011	2011 World Junior Curling Championships	Sweden (junior women)	4
2014	2014 European Curling Championships	Sweden (women)	5

== Personal life ==
He is from a well-known Swedish curling family; his older brother and longtime teammate Stefan, niece (Stefan's daughter) Maria, and his own children: daughter Anna (2018 Winter Olympics champion) and son Marcus.
