= Brigitte Leutenegger =

Swiss curler

- Curler ♀

Team
- Curling club: Uitikon-Waldegg CC, Uitikon-Waldegg

Curling career
- Member Association: Switzerland
- World Championship: 1 (1990)
- European Championship: 1 (1991)
Medal record
Curling
Swiss Women's Championship
Gold medal – first place	1990

Brigitte Leutenegger is a former Swiss curler.

At the national level, she is a Swiss women's champion curler (1990) and a two-time Swiss mixed champion curler (1982, 1991).

== Teams ==
=== Women's ===
Season	Skip	Third	Second	Lead	Alternate	Events
1989–90	Brigitte Leutenegger	Gisela Peter	Marianne Gutknecht	Karin Leutenegger		SWCC 1990 (gold); WCC 1990 (7th)
1991–92	Brigitte Leutenegger	Gisela Peter	Karin Leutenegger	Helga Greiner	Susanne Geissbühler	ECC 1991 (6th)

=== Mixed ===
Season	Skip	Third	Second	Lead	Events
1981–82	Urs Studer	Brigitte Leutenegger	Jürg Studer	Karin Leutenegger	SMxCC 1982 (gold)
1990–91	Jacques Greiner	Brigitte Leutenegger	Stephan Gertsch	Helga Greiner	SMxCC 1991 (gold)
