= Graeme Adam =

Scottish curler and coach (born 1954)

- Curler ♂
- Born: 17 February 1954 (age 72)

Team
- Curling club: Carmunnock & Rutherglen CC, Glasgow, Magnum CC, Irvine

Curling career
- Member Association: Scotland
- World Championship: 2 (1983, 1989)
- Other appearances: World Senior Championships: 1 (2008)
Medal record
Curling
Scottish Men's Championship
Gold medal – first place	1983 Kirkcaldy
Gold medal – first place	1989

Graeme P. Adam (born 17 February 1954) is a Scottish curler and curling coach.

At the national level, he is a two-time Scottish men's champion curler and one-time Scottish senior men's champion.

== Teams ==
Season	Skip	Third	Second	Lead	Alternate	Events
1980–81	Graeme P. Adam	Ken J. Horton	Robert A. Cowan	Robin J. Copland		
1981–82	Graeme P. Adam	Ken J. Horton	Andrew McQuistin	Robert A. Cowan		
1982–83	Graeme Adam	Ken Horton	Andrew McQuistin	Bob Cowan		SMCC 1983 (gold); WCC 1983 (5th)
1984–85	Graeme Adam	Ken J. Horton	Grant McPherson	Robert Wilson		
1988–89	Graeme Adam	Ken Horton	Andrew McQuistin	Robin Copland		SMCC 1989 (gold); WCC 1989 (5th)
2007–08	Graeme Adam	Ken Horton	Stuart Naismith	Allan MacLennan	Jim Jamieson	SSCC 2008 (gold); WSCC 2008 (4th)
2008–09	Graeme Adam	Ken Horton	Stuart Naismith	Allan MacLennan		
2017–18	Willie Jamieson	Tom Pendreigh	Graeme Adam	Jean Lesperance		
2018–19	Willie Jamieson	Tom Pendreigh	Graeme Adam	Jean Lesperance		

== Record as a coach of national teams ==
Year	Tournament, event	National team	Place
2016	2016 European Curling Championships	Estonia (men)	23
