= Peter Eriksson (curler) =

Swedish male curler

- Curler ♂
- Born: 2 February 1964
- Died: 30 July 2014 (aged 50)

Team
- Curling club: Sollefteå CK, Sollefteå

Curling career
- Member Association: Sweden
- World Championship: 1 (1996)
Medal record
Curling

Peter Eriksson (2 February 1964 – 30 July 2014) was a Swedish curler.

== Teams ==
Season	Skip	Third	Second	Lead	Alternate	Events
1995–96	Mikael Hasselborg	Stefan Hasselborg	Hans Nordin	Peter Eriksson	Lars-Åke Nordström (WCC)	WCC 1996 (5th)
2005–06	Peter Eriksson	Anders Kraupp	Christer Rickman	Anton Sandström		
2006–07	Anders Kraupp	Per Sodergren	Peter Eriksson	Anton Sandström		
