= Michael Sindt =

Danish male curler

- Curler ♂

Team
- Curling club: Frederiksberg CC

Curling career
- Member Association: Denmark
- World Championship: 1 (1985)
- European Championship: 3 (1982, 1983, 1984)
Medal record
Curling
World Championships
Bronze medal – third place	1985 Glasgow
Danish Men's Championship
Gold medal – first place	1985

Michael Sindt is a Danish curler.

He is a 1985 World Men's bronze medallist.

== Teams ==
Season	Skip	Third	Second	Lead	Events
1982–83	Frants Gufler	Hans Gufler	Michael Sindt	Holger Slotsager	ECC 1982 (4th)
1983–84	Frants Gufler	Hans Gufler	Michael Sindt	Holger Slotsager	ECC 1983 (6th)
1984–85	Frants Gufler	Hans Gufler	Michael Sindt	Steen Hansen	ECC 1984 (6th)
1984–85	Hans Gufler (fourth)	Steen Hansen	Michael Sindt	Frants Gufler (skip)	DMCC 1985 (gold); WCC 1985 (bronze)
