= Amédéé Biner =

Swiss curler

- Curler ♂

Team
- Curling club: CC Zermatt

Curling career
- Member Association: Switzerland
- European Championship: 1 (1983)
Medal record
Curling
European Championships
Gold medal – first place	1983 Västerås

Amédéé Biner is a former Swiss curler. He played skip position on the Swiss rink that won 1983 European Curling Championships.

== Teams ==
Season	Skip	Third	Second	Lead	Events
1983–84	Amédéé Biner	Walter Bielser	Alex Aufdenblatten	Alfred Paci	ECC 1983 (gold)
1995–96	Willy Bayard	Amédéé Biner	Peter Anton Biner	Rita Rieser	SSCC 1996 (gold)

== Private life ==
Biner is a baker, and is the former president of the Swiss Bakers Confectioners Association (German: ehemaliger Präsident des Schweizerischen Bäcker-Konditorenmeister-Verbands). He is former owner of a bakery company in Zermatt named "Bäckerei-Konditorei Biner" and founded in 1932 by his father Alfons Biner, who was a competitive curler too, and is a four-time Swiss men's curling champion.

In 1994 he offered the "Praliné Cup" for the open air curling tournament "Scottish Week Curling in Zermatt". Today, the awards for this final competition are indeed the finest Swiss chocolates supplied by the Biner bakery company. The January 2018 competition marked the 25th anniversary of the Praliné Cup.
