= Sven Saile =

German curler

- Curler ♂

Team
- Curling club: CC Schwenningen

Curling career
- Member Association: Germany
- World Championship: 5 (1981, 1982, 1983, 1984, 1985)
- European Championship: 7 (1981, 1982, 1983, 1984, 1987, 1988, 1989)
Medal record
Curling
World Championships
| Silver medal – second place | 1983 Regina |
| Bronze medal – third place | 1982 Garmisch-Partenkirchen |
European Championships
| Silver medal – second place | 1982 Kirkcaldy |
| Bronze medal – third place | 1989 Engelberg |

Sven Saile is a former German curler.

== Teams ==
| Season | Skip | Third | Second | Lead | Coach | Events |
|---|---|---|---|---|---|---|
| 1980–81 | Keith Wendorf | Hans Dieter Kiesel | Sven Saile | Heiner Martin | | WCC 1981 (9th) |
| 1981–82 | Keith Wendorf | Hans Dieter Kiesel | Sven Saile | Heiner Martin | Otto Danieli (WCC) | ECC 1981 (4th); WCC 1982 (bronze) |
| 1982–83 | Keith Wendorf | Hans Dieter Kiesel | Sven Saile | Heiner Martin | | ECC 1982 (silver); WCC 1983 (silver) |
| 1983–84 | Keith Wendorf | Hans Dieter Kiesel | Sven Saile | Heiner Martin | | ECC 1983 (5th); WCC 1984 (5th) |
| 1984–85 | Keith Wendorf | Uwe Saile | Sven Saile | Andreas Sailer | | ECC 1984 (4th); WCC 1985 (9th) |
| 1987–88 | Keith Wendorf | Uwe Saile | Sven Saile | Hans Dieter Kiesel | | ECC 1987 (4th) |
| 1988–89 | Keith Wendorf | Uwe Saile | Sven Saile | Gregor Kunzemüller | | ECC 1988 (7th) |
| 1989–90 | Keith Wendorf | Sven Saile | Christoph Möckel | Uwe Saile | | ECC 1989 (bronze) |
