= Heiner Martin =

German curler

- Curler ♂

Team
- Curling club: CC Schwenningen

Curling career
- Member Association: Germany
- World Championship: 5 (1980, 1981, 1982, 1983, 1984)
- European Championship: 3 (1981, 1982, 1983)
Medal record
Curling
World Championships
Silver medal – second place	1983 Regina
Bronze medal – third place	1982 Garmisch-Partenkirchen
European Championships
Silver medal – second place	1982 Kirkcaldy

Heiner Martin is a former German curler.

== Teams ==
Season	Skip	Third	Second	Lead	Coach	Events
1979–80	Hans Dieter Kiesel (fourth)	Franz Engler (skip)	Willie Rosenfelder	Heiner Martin		WCC 1980 (6th)
1980–81	Keith Wendorf	Hans Dieter Kiesel	Sven Saile	Heiner Martin		WCC 1981 (9th)
1981–82	Keith Wendorf	Hans Dieter Kiesel	Sven Saile	Heiner Martin	Otto Danieli (WCC)	ECC 1981 (4th); WCC 1982 (bronze)
1982–83	Keith Wendorf	Hans Dieter Kiesel	Sven Saile	Heiner Martin		ECC 1982 (silver); WCC 1983 (silver)
1983–84	Keith Wendorf	Hans Dieter Kiesel	Sven Saile	Heiner Martin		ECC 1983 (5th); WCC 1984 (5th)
