= Alfred Paci =

Swiss male curler

- Curler ♂

Team
- Curling club: CC Zermatt

Curling career
- Member Association: Switzerland
- European Championship: 1 (1983)
Medal record
Curling
European Championships
Gold medal – first place	1983 Västerås

Alfred Paci is a former Swiss curler. He played lead position on the Swiss rink that won 1983 European Curling Championships.

== Teams ==
Season	Skip	Third	Second	Lead	Events
1983–84	Amédéé Biner	Walter Bielser	Alex Aufdenblatten	Alfred Paci	ECC 1983 (gold)
