= Jim Vukich =

American curler

- Curler
- Born: December 15, 1945; Chisholm, Minnesota, U.S.
- Died: August 6, 2002 (aged 56)

Team
- Curling club: Granite CC, Seattle, WA

Curling career
- Member Association: United States
- World Championship: 2 (1987, 1989)
Medal record
Curling
United States Men's Championship
Gold medal – first place	1987 Lake Placid
Gold medal – first place	1989 Detroit

James R. Vukich (December 15, 1945 – August 6, 2002) was an American curler and two-time national champion.

== Career ==
Vukich curled while growing up in Minnesota, even winning the Minnesota schoolboy curling state title in 1963. He later stepped away from the sport for a while, until picking it back up while living in Seattle. He then went on to, as skip of his team, win four Washington state championships and two national championships, the latter in 1987 and 1989. Vukich defeated the defending champion Steve Brown to win his first national title in 1987. At the 1987 World Men's Championship they missed the playoffs when they lost a tiebreaker to Germany's Rodger Schmidt, leaving Team Vukich in fifth place in the final standings. Also in 1987 Vukich competed at the first United States Olympic Curling Trials, to decide the team that would represent the United States at the 1988 Winter Olympics where curling would be a demonstration sport. The trials were a triple-elimination tournament, and Vukich's third loss came against fellow Seattle curler Roger Schnee.

In 1989, Vukich earned his second national title when he again defeated Steve Brown in the finals of the National Championship. At the 1989 World's, they finished last out of the ten teams with only one win.

== Personal life ==
Vukich met his wife Sharon while curling. She is also a multi-time national champion, having won the Women's Championship in 1980 and 1987, the Mixed Doubles Championship in 2010, and the Senior Championship in 2009 and 2010. Vukich's stepdaughter Emily and son Jake are also successful competitive curlers, Emily having competed at the 2016 World Mixed Curling Championship and Jake at the 2014 World Junior Curling Championships.

== Teams ==
Season	Skip	Third	Second	Lead	Alternate	Events
1986–87	Jim Vukich	Ron Sharpe	George Pepelnjak	Gary Joraanstad		1987 USMCC (gold); 1987 WMCC (5th)
1988–89	Jim Vukich	Curtis Fish	Bard Nordlund	Jim Pleasants	Jason Larway	1989 USMCC (gold); 1989 WMCC (10th)
