= Jack McNelly =

American curler and coach (1949–2020)

- Curler ♂
- Born: March 28, 1949; Perham, Minnesota, US
- Died: March 15, 2020 (aged 70); Monument, Colorado, US

Team
- Curling club: Broadmoor CC, Colorado Springs, Colorado

Curling career
- Member Association: United States
- World Championship: 1 (1983)
Medal record
Curling
United States Men's Championship
Gold medal – first place	1983 Colorado Springs

Arthur John McNelly (March 28, 1949 – March 15, 2020) was an American curler and curling coach.

McNelly as lead for Don Cooper's team won the United States men's curling championship in 1983, defeating Bud Somerville in the final. He was also two-time United States mixed curling champion curler.

McNelly was a long-time director of the United States Curling Association. He was USCA president in the 2002-2003 season. He served as U.S. Olympic Curling Team Leader in 2002 and 2006, and was for many years curling’s representative or alternate representative to the U.S. Olympic Committee.

== Teams ==
=== Men's ===
Season	Skip	Third	Second	Lead	Events
1982–83	Don Cooper	Jerry van Brunt Jr.	Billy Shipstad	Jack McNelly	USMCC 1983 (gold); WCC 1983 (6th)

=== Mixed ===
Season	Skip	Third	Second	Lead	Events
1989–90	Jack McNelly	Bev Behnke	Adolph Behnke	Dawna Bennett	USMxCC 1990 (gold)
1996–97	Jack McNelly	Bev Behnke	Bucky Marshall	Susan Anschuetz	USMxCC 1997 (gold)

== Record as a coach of national teams ==
Year	Tournament, event	National team	Place
2001	2001 World Men's Curling Championship	United States (men)	6
