= Nicole Dünki =

Swiss female curler

- Curler ♀
- Born: 1989 (age 36–37)

Team
- Curling club: Baden Regio СС, Baden, CC Wasserturm, Luzern

Curling career
- Member Association: Switzerland
- World Championship: 1 (2011)
- Other appearances: World Junior Championships: 1 (2009)
Medal record
Curling
Swiss Women's Championship
Bronze medal – third place	2013 Gstaad
Bronze medal – third place	2014 Schaffhausen
World Junior Championships
Bronze medal – third place	2009 Vancouver

Nicole Dünki is a Swiss female curler.

At the national level, she is a 2010 Swiss mixed champion curler and two-time Swiss women's bronze medallist (2013, 2014).

== Teams ==
=== Women's ===
Season	Skip	Third	Second	Lead	Alternate	Coach	Events
2008–09	Marisa Winkelhausen (fourth)	Martina Baumann (skip)	Franziska Kaufmann	Isobel Kurt	Nicole Dünki	Andreas Schlunegger	WJCC 2009 (bronze)
2009–10	Nicole Dünki	Julia Blum	Gabriela Welti	Fabiola Duss			
2010–11	Nicole Dünki	Alina Pätz	Gioia Oeschle	Fabiola Duss			SWCC 2011 (5th)
2010–11	Mirjam Ott	Carmen Schäfer	Carmen Küng	Janine Greiner	Nicole Dünki	Stefan Karnusian	WCC 2011 (5th)
2011–12	Manuela Siegrist	Alina Pätz	Claudia Hug	Nicole Dünki	Fabiola Duss		SWCC 2012 (5th)
2012–13	Manuela Siegrist	Alina Pätz	Nadine Lehmann	Nicole Dünki	Luzia Ebnöther	Luzia Ebnöther	SWCC 2013 (bronze)
2013–14	Alina Pätz	Nadine Lehmann	Nicole Schwägli	Nicole Dünki	Carine Mattille		
2013–14	Alina Pätz	Nadine Lehmann	Nicole Schwägli	Nicole Dünki	Isobel Kurt, Andrea Marx	Luzia Ebnöther	SWCC 2014 (bronze)

=== Mixed ===
Season	Skip	Third	Second	Lead	Alternate	Events
2009–10	Claudio Pätz	Alina Pätz	Sven Michel	Giola Oechsle	Nicole Dünki	SMxCC 2010 (gold)
