= Hans Dieter Kiesel =

German curler

- Curler ♂

Team
- Curling club: CC Schwenningen

Curling career
- Member Association: Germany
- World Championship: 7 (1980, 1981, 1982, 1983, 1984)
- European Championship: 4 (1981, 1982, 1983, 1987)
- Other appearances: World Junior Championships: 2 (1975, 1976)
Medal record
Curling
World Championships
Silver medal – second place	1983 Regina
Bronze medal – third place	1982 Garmisch-Partenkirchen
European Championships
Silver medal – second place	1982 Kirkcaldy

Hans Dieter Kiesel is a former German curler.

== Teams ==
Season	Skip	Third	Second	Lead	Coach	Events
1974–75	Hans Dieter Kiesel	Rainer Schöpp	Peter Lessinger	Roland Liedtke		WJCC 1975 (7th)
1975–76	Hans Dieter Kiesel	Rainer Schöpp	Wolfgang Artinger	Norbert Petrasch		WJCC 1976 (7th)
1979–80	Hans Dieter Kiesel (fourth)	Franz Engler (skip)	Willie Rosenfelder	Heiner Martin		WCC 1980 (6th)
1980–81	Keith Wendorf	Hans Dieter Kiesel	Sven Saile	Heiner Martin		WCC 1981 (9th)
1981–82	Keith Wendorf	Hans Dieter Kiesel	Sven Saile	Heiner Martin	Otto Danieli (WCC)	ECC 1981 (4th); WCC 1982 (bronze)
1982–83	Keith Wendorf	Hans Dieter Kiesel	Sven Saile	Heiner Martin		ECC 1982 (silver); WCC 1983 (silver)
1983–84	Keith Wendorf	Hans Dieter Kiesel	Sven Saile	Heiner Martin		ECC 1983 (5th); WCC 1984 (5th)
1987–88	Keith Wendorf	Uwe Saile	Sven Saile	Hans Dieter Kiesel		ECC 1987 (4th)
