= Lars Wernblom =

Swedish male curler (born 1961)

- Curler ♂
- Born: 23 October 1961 (age 65)

Team
- Curling club: Sollefteå CK, Sollefteå

Curling career
- Member Association: Sweden
- World Championship: 3 (1983, 1985, 1986)
Medal record
Curling
World Championships
Silver medal – second place	1985 Glasgow

Lars Lennart Wernblom (born 23 October 1961) is a Swedish curler.

He is a 1985 World championship silver medallist.

== Teams ==
Season	Skip	Third	Second	Lead	Events
1982–83	Stefan Hasselborg	Mikael Hasselborg	Hans Nordin	Lars Wernblom	WCC 1983 (4th)
1984–85	Stefan Hasselborg	Mikael Hasselborg	Hans Nordin	Lars Wernblom	WCC 1985 (silver)
1985–86	Stefan Hasselborg	Mikael Hasselborg	Hans Nordin	Lars Wernblom	WCC 1986 (4th)
