= 1983 Air Canada Silver Broom =

- Host city: Regina, Saskatchewan, Canada
- Arena: Agridome
- Dates: April 11–17, 1983
- Winner: Canada
- Curling club: Avonlea CC, Don Mills
- Skip: Ed Werenich
- Third: Paul Savage
- Second: John Kawaja
- Lead: Neil Harrison
- Finalist: West Germany (Keith Wendorf)

The 1983 Air Canada Silver Broom, the men's world curling championship, was held from April 11–17, 1983 in the Agridome in Regina, Saskatchewan, Canada.

The final pitted two skips from Toronto, with Canada, skipped by Ed Werenich against West Germany, skipped by Keith Wendorf, who was born there. After Germany lost the coin toss to determine hammer in the first end, the game started with Canada scoring a deuce in the first, thanks in part to a hit and roll by second John Kawaja. The Germans replied with a single in the second. Werenich had a nervous shot against two in the third, having to hit a partially buried German stone, while avoiding knocking the German guard into the house at the same time. Wereinch made the hit to take a 3–1 lead. Canada then tried to play a more defensive game, but had trouble making peels on the "demanding" ice. But the Werenich team was used to playing aggressive, and were able to pivot. Both Wendorf and Werenich made "clutch" draws to the four-foot on their finals stones in the fourth and fifth ends, respectively, which gave Canada a 4–2 lead into the break. Wendorf made a "pressure-packed" hit in the sixth against two Canadian stones to get within a point of Canada. In the seventh, Wendorf missed on his first, ticking on a guard. Werenich replied by coming throw a port to hit a German counter. Wendorf was light on his last rock, and Werenich drew for a second point to give Canada a 6–3 lead. In the eighth, Wendorf was facing four on his last, and attempted a hit and roll to score. Unfortunately for him, he did not roll far enough, with a measurement giving Canada a steal of one. Canada went on to win the game 7–4. It was the best showing for West Germany at the World Championship.

== Teams ==
| Austria | Canada | Denmark | West Germany | Italy |
| Kitzbühel CC, Kitzbühel Skip: Arthur Fabi; Third: Günther Märker; Second: Manfred Fabi; Lead: Dieter Küchenmeister | Avonlea CC, Don Mills Skip: Ed Werenich; Third: Paul Savage; Second: John Kawaja; Lead: Neil Harrison | Hvidovre CC, Hvidovre Skip: Tommy Stjerne; Third: Oluf Olsen; Second: Steen Hansen; Lead: Peter Andersen | CC Schwenningen, Villingen-Schwenningen Skip: Keith Wendorf; Third: Hans Dieter Kiesel; Second: Sven Saile; Lead: Heiner Martin | Cortina CC, Cortina d'Ampezzo Fourth: Massimo Alvera (Note: For the last three draws, Alvera threw third stones, while Sovilla threw fourth stones.); Third: Franco Sovilla; Skip: Giuseppe Dal Molin; Lead: Stefano Morona |
| Norway | Scotland | Sweden | Switzerland | United States |
| Snarøen CC, Snarøya Skip: Eigil Ramsfjell; Third: Sjur Loen; Second: Gunnar Meland; Lead: Bo Bakke | Magnum CC, Irvine Skip: Graeme Adam; Third: Ken Horton; Second: Andrew McQuistin; Lead: Bob Cowan | Sollefteå CK, Sollefteå Skip: Stefan Hasselborg; Third: Mikael Hasselborg; Second: Hans Nordin; Lead: Lars Wernblom | Bern-Wildstrubel CC, Bern Skip: Urs Studer; Third: Bruno Binggeli; Second: Jürg Studer; Lead: Daniel Wyser | Broadmoor CC, Colorado Springs Skip: Don Cooper; Third: Jerry van Brunt Jr. Second: Billy Shipstad; Lead: Jack McNelly |

== Round-robin standings ==
Key
| Teams to playoffs |
| Teams to tiebreaker |

| Country | Skip | W | L | S% |
| Canada | Ed Werenich | 8 | 1 | 79% |
| West Germany | Keith Wendorf | 6 | 3 | 73% |
| Sweden | Stefan Hasselborg | 6 | 3 | 76% |
| Norway | Eigil Ramsfjell | 6 | 3 | 77% |
| Scotland | Graeme Adam | 6 | 3 | 72% |
| United States | Don Cooper | 5 | 4 | 71% |
| Denmark | Tommy Stjerne | 5 | 4 | 71% |
| Switzerland | Urs Studer | 2 | 7 | 68% |
| Austria | Arthur Fabi | 1 | 8 | 53% |
| Italy | Giuseppe Dal Molin | 0 | 9 | 64% |

== Results ==
All draw times are listed in Central Standard Time (UTC−06:00).

=== Draw 1 ===
Monday, April 11, 12:00pm

| Sheet A | 1 | 2 | 3 | 4 | 5 | 6 | 7 | 8 | 9 | 10 | Final |
|---|---|---|---|---|---|---|---|---|---|---|---|
| United States (Cooper) | 0 | 1 | 0 | 2 | 0 | 1 | 0 | 0 | 2 | 0 | 6 |
| Scotland (Adam) | 0 | 0 | 0 | 0 | 2 | 0 | 3 | 0 | 0 | 2 | 7 |

| Sheet B | 1 | 2 | 3 | 4 | 5 | 6 | 7 | 8 | 9 | 10 | Final |
|---|---|---|---|---|---|---|---|---|---|---|---|
| Norway (Ramfsjell) | 0 | 0 | 1 | 0 | 0 | 0 | 3 | 0 | 1 | X | 5 |
| Sweden (Hasselborg) | 1 | 1 | 0 | 0 | 1 | 1 | 0 | 4 | 0 | X | 8 |

| Sheet C | 1 | 2 | 3 | 4 | 5 | 6 | 7 | 8 | 9 | 10 | Final |
|---|---|---|---|---|---|---|---|---|---|---|---|
| Denmark (Stjerne) | 0 | 2 | 0 | 0 | 0 | 0 | 1 | 0 | 0 | X | 3 |
| Canada (Werenich) | 1 | 0 | 0 | 0 | 2 | 0 | 0 | 2 | 1 | X | 6 |

| Sheet D | 1 | 2 | 3 | 4 | 5 | 6 | 7 | 8 | 9 | 10 | Final |
|---|---|---|---|---|---|---|---|---|---|---|---|
| Switzerland (Studer) | 0 | 1 | 0 | 1 | 0 | 0 | 0 | 2 | 0 | X | 4 |
| West Germany (Wendorf) | 1 | 0 | 1 | 0 | 1 | 1 | 2 | 0 | 2 | X | 8 |

| Sheet E | 1 | 2 | 3 | 4 | 5 | 6 | 7 | 8 | 9 | 10 | Final |
|---|---|---|---|---|---|---|---|---|---|---|---|
| Austria (Fabi) | 0 | 2 | 0 | 1 | 1 | 1 | 0 | 0 | 1 | 1 | 7 |
| Italy (Dal Molin) | 2 | 0 | 2 | 0 | 0 | 0 | 1 | 1 | 0 | 0 | 6 |

=== Draw 2 ===
Monday, April 11, 7:30pm

| Sheet A | 1 | 2 | 3 | 4 | 5 | 6 | 7 | 8 | 9 | 10 | Final |
|---|---|---|---|---|---|---|---|---|---|---|---|
| Austria (Fabi) | 2 | 0 | 0 | 0 | 1 | 0 | 0 | 0 | X | X | 3 |
| Norway (Ramfsjell) | 0 | 0 | 2 | 2 | 0 | 4 | 2 | 2 | X | X | 12 |

| Sheet B | 1 | 2 | 3 | 4 | 5 | 6 | 7 | 8 | 9 | 10 | Final |
|---|---|---|---|---|---|---|---|---|---|---|---|
| Canada (Werenich) | 1 | 0 | 2 | 3 | 0 | 0 | 0 | 1 | 0 | 1 | 8 |
| Italy (Dal Molin) | 0 | 1 | 0 | 0 | 0 | 1 | 2 | 0 | 2 | 0 | 6 |

| Sheet C | 1 | 2 | 3 | 4 | 5 | 6 | 7 | 8 | 9 | 10 | Final |
|---|---|---|---|---|---|---|---|---|---|---|---|
| United States (Cooper) | 0 | 0 | 0 | 0 | 0 | 1 | 1 | 0 | 2 | 0 | 4 |
| Switzerland (Studer) | 0 | 2 | 0 | 0 | 1 | 0 | 0 | 1 | 0 | 1 | 5 |

| Sheet D | 1 | 2 | 3 | 4 | 5 | 6 | 7 | 8 | 9 | 10 | Final |
|---|---|---|---|---|---|---|---|---|---|---|---|
| Denmark (Stjerne) | 0 | 2 | 0 | 0 | 1 | 0 | 1 | 0 | 0 | X | 4 |
| Scotland (Adam) | 2 | 0 | 2 | 0 | 0 | 2 | 0 | 1 | 3 | X | 10 |

| Sheet E | 1 | 2 | 3 | 4 | 5 | 6 | 7 | 8 | 9 | 10 | 11 | Final |
|---|---|---|---|---|---|---|---|---|---|---|---|---|
| Sweden (Hasselborg) | 0 | 0 | 0 | 0 | 0 | 2 | 0 | 0 | 1 | 1 | 0 | 4 |
| West Germany (Wendorf) | 1 | 0 | 1 | 0 | 0 | 0 | 0 | 2 | 0 | 0 | 1 | 5 |

=== Draw 3 ===
Tuesday, April 12, 12:30pm

| Sheet A | 1 | 2 | 3 | 4 | 5 | 6 | 7 | 8 | 9 | 10 | Final |
|---|---|---|---|---|---|---|---|---|---|---|---|
| West Germany (Wendorf) | 2 | 1 | 1 | 2 | 0 | 1 | 0 | 1 | X | X | 8 |
| Italy (Dal Molin) | 0 | 0 | 0 | 0 | 1 | 0 | 1 | 0 | X | X | 2 |

| Sheet B | 1 | 2 | 3 | 4 | 5 | 6 | 7 | 8 | 9 | 10 | Final |
|---|---|---|---|---|---|---|---|---|---|---|---|
| Scotland (Adam) | 0 | 0 | 0 | 1 | 2 | 0 | 1 | 1 | 0 | 0 | 5 |
| Switzerland (Studer) | 1 | 1 | 0 | 0 | 0 | 1 | 0 | 0 | 1 | 0 | 4 |

| Sheet C | 1 | 2 | 3 | 4 | 5 | 6 | 7 | 8 | 9 | 10 | Final |
|---|---|---|---|---|---|---|---|---|---|---|---|
| Sweden (Hasselborg) | 2 | 0 | 4 | 1 | 0 | 0 | 3 | 3 | X | X | 13 |
| Austria (Fabi) | 0 | 1 | 0 | 0 | 1 | 1 | 0 | 0 | X | X | 3 |

| Sheet D | 1 | 2 | 3 | 4 | 5 | 6 | 7 | 8 | 9 | 10 | Final |
|---|---|---|---|---|---|---|---|---|---|---|---|
| Canada (Werenich) | 0 | 1 | 0 | 0 | 1 | 1 | 0 | X | X | X | 3 |
| United States (Cooper) | 2 | 0 | 2 | 1 | 0 | 0 | 5 | X | X | X | 10 |

| Sheet E | 1 | 2 | 3 | 4 | 5 | 6 | 7 | 8 | 9 | 10 | Final |
|---|---|---|---|---|---|---|---|---|---|---|---|
| Denmark (Stjerne) | 0 | 2 | 0 | 2 | 0 | 2 | 0 | 0 | 1 | X | 7 |
| Norway (Ramfsjell) | 3 | 0 | 1 | 0 | 1 | 0 | 2 | 2 | 0 | X | 9 |

=== Draw 4 ===
Tuesday, April 12, 7:30pm

| Sheet A | 1 | 2 | 3 | 4 | 5 | 6 | 7 | 8 | 9 | 10 | Final |
|---|---|---|---|---|---|---|---|---|---|---|---|
| Scotland (Adam) | 0 | 0 | 2 | 2 | 0 | 0 | 2 | 0 | 0 | 0 | 6 |
| Sweden (Hasselborg) | 2 | 0 | 0 | 0 | 1 | 1 | 0 | 0 | 2 | 1 | 7 |

| Sheet B | 1 | 2 | 3 | 4 | 5 | 6 | 7 | 8 | 9 | 10 | Final |
|---|---|---|---|---|---|---|---|---|---|---|---|
| Denmark (Stjerne) | 0 | 1 | 0 | 0 | 1 | 0 | 1 | 1 | 0 | X | 4 |
| United States (Cooper) | 1 | 0 | 1 | 0 | 0 | 3 | 0 | 0 | 1 | X | 6 |

| Sheet C | 1 | 2 | 3 | 4 | 5 | 6 | 7 | 8 | 9 | 10 | Final |
|---|---|---|---|---|---|---|---|---|---|---|---|
| Norway (Ramfsjell) | 2 | 0 | 1 | 0 | 2 | 0 | 0 | 0 | 2 | 0 | 7 |
| Italy (Dal Molin) | 0 | 1 | 0 | 1 | 0 | 2 | 1 | 0 | 0 | 0 | 5 |

| Sheet D | 1 | 2 | 3 | 4 | 5 | 6 | 7 | 8 | 9 | 10 | Final |
|---|---|---|---|---|---|---|---|---|---|---|---|
| West Germany (Wendorf) | 4 | 0 | 1 | 1 | 4 | 0 | 4 | 2 | X | X | 16 |
| Austria (Fabi) | 0 | 1 | 0 | 0 | 0 | 1 | 0 | 0 | X | X | 2 |

| Sheet E | 1 | 2 | 3 | 4 | 5 | 6 | 7 | 8 | 9 | 10 | Final |
|---|---|---|---|---|---|---|---|---|---|---|---|
| Switzerland (Studer) | 0 | 0 | 0 | 1 | 0 | 0 | 0 | 1 | X | X | 2 |
| Canada (Werenich) | 0 | 2 | 0 | 0 | 0 | 5 | 1 | 0 | X | X | 8 |

=== Draw 5 ===
Wednesday, April 13, 12:30pm

| Sheet A | 1 | 2 | 3 | 4 | 5 | 6 | 7 | 8 | 9 | 10 | Final |
|---|---|---|---|---|---|---|---|---|---|---|---|
| Denmark (Stjerne) | 1 | 0 | 4 | 1 | 3 | 1 | 0 | 1 | X | X | 11 |
| Austria (Fabi) | 0 | 1 | 0 | 0 | 0 | 0 | 1 | 0 | X | X | 2 |

| Sheet B | 1 | 2 | 3 | 4 | 5 | 6 | 7 | 8 | 9 | 10 | Final |
|---|---|---|---|---|---|---|---|---|---|---|---|
| Sweden (Hasselborg) | 1 | 0 | 3 | 0 | 1 | 0 | 0 | 1 | 0 | X | 6 |
| Canada (Werenich) | 0 | 1 | 0 | 1 | 0 | 2 | 2 | 0 | 3 | X | 9 |

| Sheet C | 1 | 2 | 3 | 4 | 5 | 6 | 7 | 8 | 9 | 10 | Final |
|---|---|---|---|---|---|---|---|---|---|---|---|
| Scotland (Adam) | 0 | 1 | 1 | 1 | 0 | 0 | 0 | 1 | 0 | 1 | 5 |
| West Germany (Wendorf) | 1 | 0 | 0 | 0 | 1 | 0 | 1 | 0 | 1 | 0 | 4 |

| Sheet D | 1 | 2 | 3 | 4 | 5 | 6 | 7 | 8 | 9 | 10 | Final |
|---|---|---|---|---|---|---|---|---|---|---|---|
| Norway (Ramfsjell) | 0 | 0 | 3 | 0 | 0 | 2 | 0 | 1 | 1 | 2 | 9 |
| Switzerland (Studer) | 1 | 0 | 0 | 3 | 1 | 0 | 1 | 0 | 0 | 0 | 6 |

| Sheet E | 1 | 2 | 3 | 4 | 5 | 6 | 7 | 8 | 9 | 10 | Final |
|---|---|---|---|---|---|---|---|---|---|---|---|
| Italy (Dal Molin) | 0 | 0 | 0 | 1 | 0 | 0 | X | X | X | X | 1 |
| United States (Cooper) | 3 | 2 | 3 | 0 | 1 | 2 | X | X | X | X | 11 |

=== Draw 6 ===
Wednesday, April 13, 7:30pm

| Sheet A | 1 | 2 | 3 | 4 | 5 | 6 | 7 | 8 | 9 | 10 | Final |
|---|---|---|---|---|---|---|---|---|---|---|---|
| Italy (Dal Molin) | 0 | 0 | 0 | 1 | 0 | 0 | 0 | 0 | 2 | X | 3 |
| Switzerland (Studer) | 0 | 2 | 0 | 0 | 1 | 2 | 1 | 0 | 0 | X | 6 |

| Sheet B | 1 | 2 | 3 | 4 | 5 | 6 | 7 | 8 | 9 | 10 | Final |
|---|---|---|---|---|---|---|---|---|---|---|---|
| United States (Cooper) | 0 | 1 | 0 | 0 | 1 | 2 | 1 | 4 | 0 | X | 9 |
| West Germany (Wendorf) | 2 | 0 | 1 | 1 | 0 | 0 | 0 | 0 | 2 | X | 6 |

| Sheet C | 1 | 2 | 3 | 4 | 5 | 6 | 7 | 8 | 9 | 10 | 11 | Final |
|---|---|---|---|---|---|---|---|---|---|---|---|---|
| Canada (Werenich) | 0 | 1 | 1 | 0 | 0 | 2 | 2 | 0 | 1 | 0 | 1 | 8 |
| Norway (Ramfsjell) | 2 | 0 | 0 | 1 | 1 | 0 | 0 | 1 | 0 | 2 | 0 | 7 |

| Sheet D | 1 | 2 | 3 | 4 | 5 | 6 | 7 | 8 | 9 | 10 | 11 | Final |
|---|---|---|---|---|---|---|---|---|---|---|---|---|
| Sweden (Hasselborg) | 1 | 0 | 1 | 0 | 0 | 1 | 0 | 2 | 0 | 1 | 0 | 6 |
| Denmark (Stjerne) | 0 | 1 | 0 | 0 | 1 | 0 | 2 | 0 | 2 | 0 | 1 | 7 |

| Sheet E | 1 | 2 | 3 | 4 | 5 | 6 | 7 | 8 | 9 | 10 | Final |
|---|---|---|---|---|---|---|---|---|---|---|---|
| Scotland (Adam) | 1 | 2 | 0 | 2 | 1 | 0 | 4 | 0 | X | X | 10 |
| Austria (Fabi) | 0 | 0 | 1 | 0 | 0 | 1 | 0 | 1 | X | X | 3 |

=== Draw 7 ===
Thursday, April 14, 12:30pm

| Sheet A | 1 | 2 | 3 | 4 | 5 | 6 | 7 | 8 | 9 | 10 | Final |
|---|---|---|---|---|---|---|---|---|---|---|---|
| Norway (Ramfsjell) | 1 | 0 | 0 | 1 | 3 | 0 | 2 | 0 | 0 | X | 7 |
| United States (Cooper) | 0 | 1 | 0 | 0 | 0 | 1 | 0 | 0 | 0 | X | 2 |

| Sheet B | 1 | 2 | 3 | 4 | 5 | 6 | 7 | 8 | 9 | 10 | Final |
|---|---|---|---|---|---|---|---|---|---|---|---|
| Italy (Dal Molin) | 0 | 0 | 0 | 2 | 0 | 1 | 0 | 1 | 1 | X | 5 |
| Scotland (Adam) | 1 | 0 | 1 | 0 | 4 | 0 | 3 | 0 | 0 | X | 9 |

| Sheet C | 1 | 2 | 3 | 4 | 5 | 6 | 7 | 8 | 9 | 10 | Final |
|---|---|---|---|---|---|---|---|---|---|---|---|
| Switzerland (Studer) | 0 | 0 | 0 | 0 | 3 | 0 | 0 | 2 | 0 | 0 | 5 |
| Sweden (Hasselborg) | 0 | 1 | 0 | 2 | 0 | 2 | 1 | 0 | 0 | 1 | 7 |

| Sheet D | 1 | 2 | 3 | 4 | 5 | 6 | 7 | 8 | 9 | 10 | Final |
|---|---|---|---|---|---|---|---|---|---|---|---|
| Austria (Fabi) | 0 | 0 | 1 | 0 | 1 | 1 | 0 | 0 | X | X | 3 |
| Canada (Werenich) | 1 | 1 | 0 | 6 | 0 | 0 | 1 | 2 | X | X | 11 |

| Sheet E | 1 | 2 | 3 | 4 | 5 | 6 | 7 | 8 | 9 | 10 | Final |
|---|---|---|---|---|---|---|---|---|---|---|---|
| West Germany (Wendorf) | 0 | 1 | 0 | 2 | 0 | 1 | 1 | 0 | 2 | X | 7 |
| Denmark (Stjerne) | 0 | 0 | 1 | 0 | 2 | 0 | 0 | 1 | 0 | X | 4 |

=== Draw 8 ===
Thursday, April 14, 7:30pm

| Sheet A | 1 | 2 | 3 | 4 | 5 | 6 | 7 | 8 | 9 | 10 | 11 | Final |
|---|---|---|---|---|---|---|---|---|---|---|---|---|
| Canada (Werenich) | 1 | 0 | 0 | 0 | 2 | 0 | 0 | 0 | 3 | 0 | 1 | 7 |
| West Germany (Wendorf) | 0 | 0 | 1 | 1 | 0 | 0 | 0 | 2 | 0 | 2 | 0 | 6 |

| Sheet B | 1 | 2 | 3 | 4 | 5 | 6 | 7 | 8 | 9 | 10 | Final |
|---|---|---|---|---|---|---|---|---|---|---|---|
| Switzerland (Studer) | 0 | 4 | 0 | 2 | 1 | 0 | 3 | 0 | X | X | 10 |
| Austria (Fabi) | 0 | 0 | 1 | 0 | 0 | 1 | 0 | 1 | X | X | 3 |

| Sheet C | 1 | 2 | 3 | 4 | 5 | 6 | 7 | 8 | 9 | 10 | Final |
|---|---|---|---|---|---|---|---|---|---|---|---|
| Italy (Dal Molin) | 0 | 0 | 0 | 1 | 0 | 0 | 2 | 0 | 0 | X | 3 |
| Denmark (Stjerne) | 0 | 1 | 1 | 0 | 0 | 2 | 0 | 2 | 1 | X | 7 |

| Sheet D | 1 | 2 | 3 | 4 | 5 | 6 | 7 | 8 | 9 | 10 | Final |
|---|---|---|---|---|---|---|---|---|---|---|---|
| Scotland (Adam) | 0 | 0 | 2 | 0 | 1 | 0 | 0 | 1 | 0 | 0 | 4 |
| Norway (Ramfsjell) | 0 | 0 | 0 | 3 | 0 | 1 | 0 | 0 | 0 | 2 | 6 |

| Sheet E | 1 | 2 | 3 | 4 | 5 | 6 | 7 | 8 | 9 | 10 | Final |
|---|---|---|---|---|---|---|---|---|---|---|---|
| United States (Cooper) | 1 | 0 | 0 | 0 | 2 | 0 | 1 | 0 | 2 | X | 6 |
| Sweden (Hasselborg) | 0 | 2 | 2 | 0 | 0 | 2 | 0 | 2 | 0 | X | 8 |

=== Draw 9 ===
Friday, April 15, 9:30am

| Sheet A | 1 | 2 | 3 | 4 | 5 | 6 | 7 | 8 | 9 | 10 | Final |
|---|---|---|---|---|---|---|---|---|---|---|---|
| Switzerland (Studer) | 0 | 0 | 2 | 0 | 0 | 1 | 0 | 0 | 1 | X | 4 |
| Denmark (Stjerne) | 1 | 1 | 0 | 1 | 0 | 0 | 2 | 3 | 0 | X | 8 |

| Sheet B | 1 | 2 | 3 | 4 | 5 | 6 | 7 | 8 | 9 | 10 | Final |
|---|---|---|---|---|---|---|---|---|---|---|---|
| West Germany (Wendorf) | 1 | 1 | 0 | 1 | 2 | 0 | 0 | 3 | X | X | 8 |
| Norway (Ramfsjell) | 0 | 0 | 1 | 0 | 0 | 0 | 2 | 0 | X | X | 3 |

| Sheet C | 1 | 2 | 3 | 4 | 5 | 6 | 7 | 8 | 9 | 10 | Final |
|---|---|---|---|---|---|---|---|---|---|---|---|
| Austria (Fabi) | 1 | 0 | 1 | 0 | 1 | 0 | 0 | 0 | 0 | 1 | 4 |
| United States (Cooper) | 0 | 1 | 0 | 1 | 0 | 0 | 0 | 2 | 1 | 0 | 5 |

| Sheet D | 1 | 2 | 3 | 4 | 5 | 6 | 7 | 8 | 9 | 10 | Final |
|---|---|---|---|---|---|---|---|---|---|---|---|
| Italy (Dal Molin) | 4 | 0 | 0 | 1 | 0 | 0 | 1 | 0 | 1 | X | 7 |
| Sweden (Hasselborg) | 0 | 1 | 1 | 0 | 3 | 1 | 0 | 3 | 0 | X | 9 |

| Sheet E | 1 | 2 | 3 | 4 | 5 | 6 | 7 | 8 | 9 | 10 | Final |
|---|---|---|---|---|---|---|---|---|---|---|---|
| Canada (Werenich) | 3 | 0 | 1 | 0 | 2 | 0 | 4 | 0 | 0 | X | 10 |
| Scotland (Adam) | 0 | 3 | 0 | 1 | 0 | 1 | 0 | 0 | 2 | X | 7 |

== Tiebreakers ==
=== Round 1 ===
Friday, April 15, 2:30pm

| Team | 1 | 2 | 3 | 4 | 5 | 6 | 7 | 8 | 9 | 10 | Final |
|---|---|---|---|---|---|---|---|---|---|---|---|
| Sweden (Hasselborg) | 0 | 2 | 0 | 0 | 0 | 1 | X | X | X | X | 3 |
| Norway (Ramfsjell) | 4 | 0 | 2 | 1 | 1 | 0 | X | X | X | X | 8 |

Player percentages
| Sweden | | Norway | |
|---|---|---|---|
| Lars Wernblom | 96% | Bo Bakke | 75% |
| Hans Nordin | 94% | Gunnar Meland | 67% |
| Mikael Hasselborg | 92% | Sjur Loen | 92% |
| Stefan Hasselborg | 42% | Eigil Ramsfjell | 79% |
| Total | 81% | Total | 78% |

| Team | 1 | 2 | 3 | 4 | 5 | 6 | 7 | 8 | 9 | 10 | Final |
|---|---|---|---|---|---|---|---|---|---|---|---|
| West Germany (Wendorf) | 1 | 0 | 1 | 2 | 0 | 2 | 0 | 0 | 0 | 1 | 7 |
| Scotland (Adam) | 0 | 1 | 0 | 0 | 1 | 0 | 0 | 0 | 3 | 0 | 5 |

Player percentages
| West Germany | | Scotland | |
|---|---|---|---|
| Heiner Martin | 71% | Bob Cowan | 92% |
| Sven Saile | 82% | Andrew McQuistin | 74% |
| Hans Dieter Kiesel | 83% | Ken Horton | 72% |
| Keith Wendorf | 78% | Graeme Adam | 78% |
| Total | 78% | Total | 79% |

=== Round 2 ===
Friday, April 15, 7:30pm

| Team | 1 | 2 | 3 | 4 | 5 | 6 | 7 | 8 | 9 | 10 | Final |
|---|---|---|---|---|---|---|---|---|---|---|---|
| Sweden (Hasselborg) | 0 | 0 | 0 | 2 | 1 | 0 | 0 | 1 | 0 | 2 | 6 |
| Scotland (Adam) | 0 | 2 | 0 | 0 | 0 | 0 | 2 | 0 | 1 | 0 | 5 |

Player percentages
| Sweden | | Scotland | |
|---|---|---|---|
| Lars Wernblom | 79% | Bob Cowan | 64% |
| Hans Nordin | 80% | Andrew McQuistin | 61% |
| Mikael Hasselborg | 58% | Ken Horton | 75% |
| Stefan Hasselborg | 66% | Graeme Adam | 61% |
| Total | 71% | Total | 65% |

== Playoffs ==
Semi-final
3 | Norway | 3
2 | West Germany | 4
1 | Canada | 8
4 | Sweden | 6

Final
2 | West Germany | 4
1 | Canada | 7

=== Semifinals ===
Saturday, April 16, 2:00pm

| Team | 1 | 2 | 3 | 4 | 5 | 6 | 7 | 8 | 9 | 10 | 11 | Final |
|---|---|---|---|---|---|---|---|---|---|---|---|---|
| Norway (Ramfsjell) | 0 | 0 | 0 | 0 | 0 | 1 | 0 | 1 | 0 | 1 | 0 | 3 |
| West Germany (Wendorf) | 1 | 0 | 1 | 0 | 0 | 0 | 0 | 0 | 1 | 0 | 1 | 4 |

Player percentages
| Norway | | West Germany | |
|---|---|---|---|
| Bo Bakke | 80% | Heiner Martin | 67% |
| Gunnar Meland | 84% | Sven Saile | 84% |
| Sjur Loen | 70% | Hans Dieter Kiesel | 65% |
| Eigil Ramsfjell | 86% | Keith Wendorf | 73% |
| Total | 80% | Total | 72% |

| Team | 1 | 2 | 3 | 4 | 5 | 6 | 7 | 8 | 9 | 10 | Final |
|---|---|---|---|---|---|---|---|---|---|---|---|
| Canada (Werenich) | 1 | 0 | 2 | 0 | 0 | 4 | 0 | 0 | 1 | X | 8 |
| Sweden (Hasselborg) | 0 | 1 | 0 | 0 | 1 | 0 | 2 | 1 | 0 | X | 5 |

Player percentages
| Canada | | Sweden | |
|---|---|---|---|
| Neil Harrison | 89% | Lars Wernblom | 79% |
| John Kawaja | 73% | Hans Nordin | 81% |
| Paul Savage | 91% | Mikael Hasselborg | 74% |
| Ed Werenich | 71% | Stefan Hasselborg | 67% |
| Total | 81% | Total | 75% |

=== Final ===
Sunday, April 17, 1:00pm

| Team | 1 | 2 | 3 | 4 | 5 | 6 | 7 | 8 | 9 | 10 | Final |
|---|---|---|---|---|---|---|---|---|---|---|---|
| West Germany (Wendorf) | 0 | 1 | 0 | 1 | 0 | 1 | 0 | 0 | 1 | X | 4 |
| Canada (Werenich) 🔨 | 2 | 0 | 1 | 0 | 1 | 0 | 2 | 1 | 0 | X | 7 |

Player percentages
| West Germany | | Canada | |
|---|---|---|---|
| Heiner Martin | 80% | Neil Harrison | 75% |
| Sven Saile | 79% | John Kawaja | 78% |
| Hans Dieter Kiesel | 61% | Paul Savage | 73% |
| Keith Wendorf | 68% | Ed Werenich | 85% |
| Total | 72% | Total | 77% |

1983 Air Canada Silver Broom
(Canada)
Canada
15th title

== Top five player percentages ==
| Leads | % |
|---|---|
| (Norway) Bo Bakke | 86 |
| (Canada) Neil Harrison | 84 |
| (Sweden) Lars Wernblom | 73 |
| (United States) Jack McNelly | 72 |
| (Denmark) Peter Andersen | 71 |
| (Scotland) Bob Cowan | 71 |

| Seconds | % |
|---|---|
| (Sweden) Hans Nordin | 81 |
| (Canada) John Kawaja | 80 |
| (Norway) Gunnar Meland | 76 |
| (United States) Billy Shipstad | 74 |
| (Denmark) Steen Hansen | 72 |
| (West Germany) Sven Saile | 72 |

| Thirds | % |
|---|---|
| (Canada) Paul Savage | 81 |
| (West Germany) Hans Dieter Kiesel | 76 |
| (Norway) Sjur Loen | 76 |
| (Denmark) Oluf Olsen | 74 |
| (Sweden) Mikael Hasselborg | 74 |

| Skips | % |
|---|---|
| (Scotland) Graeme Adam | 76 |
| (Sweden) Stefan Hasselborg | 76 |
| (Canada) Ed Werenich | 73 |
| (West Germany) Keith Wendorf | 73 |
| (Norway) Eigil Ramsfjell | 71 |
