= Keith Wendorf =

German curler (born 1949)

- Curler ♂
- Born: 20 December 1949 (age 76); East York, Toronto, Ontario, Canada

Team
- Curling club: Munchener EV, CC Schwenningen

Curling career
- Member Association: Germany
- World Championship: 7 (1978, 1979, 1981, 1982, 1983, 1984, 1985)
- European Championship: 8 (1979, 1981, 1982, 1983, 1984, 1987, 1988, 1989)
Medal record
Curling
Representing Germany
World Championships
Silver medal – second place	1983 Regina
Bronze medal – third place	1982 Garmisch-Partenkirchen
European Championships
Silver medal – second place	1982 Kirkcaldy
Bronze medal – third place	1989 Engelberg

Keith Wendorf (born 20 December 1949) is a former German curler and a curling coach.

Wendorf was born in Ontario, the son of a serviceman, and his wife, Muriel while they were stationed there. The family would later move to Gagetown, New Brunswick. There, Wendorf began his participation in curling in 1966 at the high school level. He would go on to graduate from the University of New Brunswick with a BA in 1972.

After his family were posted to West Germany, he followed them to live there. In Germany, he managed the CFB Lahr curling club. During his time in Germany, Keith competed in 7 World Curling Championships (1978-1979, 1981-1985) highlighted by winning a silver medal in 1983.

He was the National Curling Coach of Germany from 1994 to 2002.

In 2002, Keith Wendorf began works at the World Curling Federation as the Director of Competitions and Development. After 16 years he retired at the end of June 2018.

He is married to Susan Wendorf and currently resides in France.

== Awards and honours ==
- Colin Campbell Award: 1979, 1983.
- World Curling Freytag Award: 1994.
- Inducted in World Curling Federation Hall of Fame: 2012 (as Freytag Award winner; one and only German curler in WCF Hall of Fame for today).

== Teams ==
Season	Skip	Third	Second	Lead	Coach	Events
1977–78	Keith Wendorf	Sascha Fischer-Weppler	Balint von Bery	Heino von L'Estocq		WCC 1978 (6th)
1978–79	Keith Wendorf	Balint von Bery	Sascha Fischer-Weppler	Heino von L'Estocq		WCC 1979 (4th)
1979–80	Keith Wendorf	Balint von Bery	Heino von L'Estocq	Peter Fischer-Weppler		ECC 1979 (7th)
1980–81	Keith Wendorf	Hans Dieter Kiesel	Sven Saile	Heiner Martin		WCC 1981 (9th)
1981–82	Keith Wendorf	Hans Dieter Kiesel	Sven Saile	Heiner Martin	Otto Danieli (WCC)	ECC 1981 (4th); WCC 1982 (bronze)
1982–83	Keith Wendorf	Hans Dieter Kiesel	Sven Saile	Heiner Martin		ECC 1982 (silver); WCC 1983 (silver)
1983–84	Keith Wendorf	Hans Dieter Kiesel	Sven Saile	Heiner Martin		ECC 1983 (5th); WCC 1984 (5th)
1984–85	Keith Wendorf	Uwe Saile	Sven Saile	Andreas Sailer		ECC 1984 (4th); WCC 1985 (9th)
1987–88	Keith Wendorf	Uwe Saile	Sven Saile	Hans Dieter Kiesel		ECC 1987 (4th)
1988–89	Keith Wendorf	Uwe Saile	Sven Saile	Gregor Kunzemüller		ECC 1988 (7th)
1989–90	Keith Wendorf	Sven Saile	Christoph Möckel	Uwe Saile		ECC 1989 (bronze)

== Record as a coach of national teams ==
Year	Tournament, event	National team	Place
1994	1994 European Curling Championships	Germany (men)	5
1995	1995 European Curling Championships	Germany (men)	5
1996	1996 European Curling Championships	Germany (men)	4
1997	1997 European Curling Championships	Germany (men)	1st place, gold medalist(s)
1998	1998 World Men's Curling Championship	Germany (men)	10
1998	1998 European Curling Championships	Germany (men)	6
1999	1999 World Men's Curling Championship	Germany (men)	7
1999	1999 European Curling Championships	Germany (men)	9
2000	2000 World Junior Curling Championships	Germany (junior men)	3rd place, bronze medalist(s)
2000	2000 World Women's Curling Championship	Germany (women)	6
2000	2000 European Curling Championships	Germany (men)	6
2001	2001 World Junior Curling Championships	Germany (junior women)	10
2001	2001 World Men's Curling Championship	Germany (men)	6
2001	2001 European Curling Championships	Germany (men)	8
