= Bruno Binggeli =

Swiss curler

- Curler ♂

Team
- Curling club: Bern-Wildstrubel CC, Bern

Curling career
- Member Association: Switzerland
- World Championship: 1 (1983)
Medal record
Curling
Swiss Men's Championship
Gold medal – first place	1983 Wildhaus

Bruno Binggeli (born c. 1943) is a Swiss curler.

At the national level, he is a 1983 Swiss men's and 1987 Swiss senior champion curler.

== Teams ==
Season	Skip	Third	Second	Lead	Events
1982–83	Bruno Binggeli	Urs Studer	Jürg Studer	Daniel Wyser	SMCC 1983 (gold)
1982–83	Urs Studer	Bruno Binggeli	Jürg Studer	Daniel Wyser	WCC 1983 (8th)
1986–87	Bruno Binggeli	Kurt Wyser	Urs Ziegler	Urs Kocher	SSCC 1987 (gold)
