= Hans Gufler =

Danish male curler

- Curler ♂
- Born: c. 1961

Team
- Curling club: Frederiksberg CC, Frederiksberg

Curling career
- Member Association: Denmark
- World Championship: 1 (1985)
- European Championship: 3 (1982, 1983, 1984)
Medal record
Curling
World Championships
Bronze medal – third place	1985 Glasgow
Danish Men's Championship
Gold medal – first place	1985

Hans Gufler is a Danish curler and curling coach.

He is a 1985 World Men's bronze medallist.

At the national level, he is a Danish men's and mixed curling champion curler.

== Teams ==
=== Men's ===
Season	Skip	Third	Second	Lead	Events
1982–83	Frants Gufler	Hans Gufler	Michael Sindt	Holger Slotsager	ECC 1982 (4th)
1983–84	Frants Gufler	Hans Gufler	Michael Sindt	Holger Slotsager	ECC 1983 (6th)
1984–85	Frants Gufler	Hans Gufler	Michael Sindt	Steen Hansen	ECC 1984 (6th)
1984–85	Hans Gufler (fourth)	Steen Hansen	Michael Sindt	Frants Gufler (skip)	DMCC 1985 (gold); WCC 1985 (bronze)

=== Mixed ===
Season	Skip	Third	Second	Lead	Events
1985	Per Berg	Helena Blach	Hans Gufler	Malene Krause	DMxCC 1985 (gold)

== Record as a coach of national teams ==
Year	Tournament, event	National team	Place
2001	2001 European Curling Championships	Denmark (women)	2nd place, silver medalist(s)
