= Russ Armstrong =

American curler (born 1962)

- Curler ♂
- Born: May 3, 1962 (age 64); Evanston, Illinois, U.S.

Team
- Curling club: Wilmette CC, Wilmette, Chicago CC (Chicago), Exmoor CC (Highland Park, IL)

Curling career
- Member Association: United States
- World Championship: 1 (1985)
- Other appearances: World Senior Championships: 2 (2014, 2018)
Medal record
Curling
United States Men's Championship
Gold medal – first place	1985 Mequon

Russell H. Armstrong (born May 3, 1962) is an American curler.

At the international level, he is a 2018 World senior championships bronze medallist.

At the national level, he is a 1985 United States men's curling champion curler and two-time United States senior curler champion (2014, 2018).

== Teams ==
=== Men's ===
Season	Skip	Third	Second	Lead	Alternate	Events
1984–85	Tim Wright	John Jahant	Jim Wilson	Russ Armstrong		USMCC 1985 (gold); WCC 1985 (4th)
1991–92	Tim Wright	James C. Wilson	Gregory Gallagher	Russell H. Armstrong		USMCC 1992 (???th)
2001–02	Jeffrey A. Wright	Russell H. Armstrong	John A. Beckwith	Arthur D. Helt, Jr	Robert A. Moulton	USMCC 2002 (???th)
2004–05	Russell H. Armstrong	Sean Silver	J. Michael Griem	Carl N. Anderson, Jr	Steven Waters	USMCC 2005 (???th)
2009–10	Jeffrey A. Wright	Russell H. Armstrong	Steve Waters	Russell C. Brown	Steve Wright	USMCC 2010 (???th)
2010–11	Jeffrey A. Wright	Russell H. Armstrong	Russell C. Brown	Steve Wright		USMCC 2011 (???th)
2012–13	Jeffrey A. Wright	Russell H. Armstrong	Sean Silver	Russell C. Brown	Steve Wright	USMCC 2013 (???th)
2012–13	Jeff Wright	Russ Armstrong	Dave Carlson	Nils Johansson		USSCC 2013 (10th)
2013–14	Jeffrey A. Wright	Russell H. Armstrong	Russell C. Brown	Steven Waters	Steve Wright	USMCC 2014 (???th)
2013–14	Jeff Wright	Russ Armstrong	Russ Brown	Nils Johansson	Jim Wilson	USSCC 2014 (gold)
2013–14	Jeff Wright	Russ Armstrong	Jim Wilson	Nils Johansson	Russ Brown	WSCC 2014 (4th)
2014–15	Jeff Wright	Russ Armstrong	Jim Wilson	Russ Brown		USSCC 2015 (bronze)
2017–18	Jeff Wright	Russ Armstrong	Russ Brown	Sean Silver	Steve Waters	USSCC 2018 (gold)
2017–18	Jeff Wright	Russ Armstrong	Sean Silver	Russ Brown	Steve Waters	WSCC 2018 (bronze)
2019–20	Jeff Wright	Russ Armstrong	Sean Silver	Russ Brown		USSCC 2020 (silver)

=== Mixed ===
Season	Skip	Third	Second	Lead	Events
1988–89	Tim Wright	Amy Hatten	Russell H. Armstrong	—	USMxCC 1989 (???th)
2002–03	Russell H. Armstrong	Marcy G. Calaway	Raymond H. Finlay	Shelley A. Pilon	USMxCC 2003 (???th)
2008–09	Russ Armstrong	Amy Brown	Ken Brown	Leslie Earls	USMxCC 2009 (???th)
