= Don Cooper (curler) =

American curler

- Curler ♂
- Born: c. 1942; Edmonton, Alberta, Canada

Team
- Curling club: Broadmoor CC, Colorado Springs, CO

Curling career
- Member Association: United States
- World Championship: 1 (1983)
Medal record
Curling
United States Men's Championship
Gold medal – first place	1983 Colorado Springs

Don Cooper (born c. 1942) is an American curler.

Cooper won the United States men's curling championship in 1983, defeating Bud Somerville in the final.

Born in Edmonton, Cooper moved to Seattle at the age of 14 when his pharmacist father went into semi-retirement. He began curling at the age of 23. He moved to Colorado Springs in around 1980. At the time of the 1983 World Championships, he worked as a district manager at a computer company.

== Teams ==
Season	Skip	Third	Second	Lead	Events
1982–83	Don Cooper	Jerry van Brunt Jr.	Billy Shipstad	Jack McNelly	USMCC 1983 (gold); WCC 1983 (6th)
