= Bard Nordlund =

American curler

- Curler

Curling career
- Member Association: United States
- World Championship: 3 (1988, 1989, 1990)
Medal record
Curling
United States Men's Championship
Gold medal – first place	1988 St. Paul
Gold medal – first place	1989 Detroit
Gold medal – first place	1990 Superior

Bard Nordlund is an American curler and three-time national champion from Seattle, Washington.

== Curling career ==
In 1988, Nordlund played third on Doug Jones' national champion team; they went on to finish in tenth place at the World Championship. The following year Nordlund returned to Nationals on Jim Vukich's team and again winning the championship and placing tenth at Worlds. In 1990 Nordlund returned to Jones' team and once more won gold at the National Championship— this time improving to seventh at World's.

== Teams ==
Season	Skip	Third	Second	Lead	Alternate	Events
1987–88	Doug Jones	Bard Nordlund	Murphy Tomlinson	Mike Grennan		1988 USMCC (gold); 1988 WMCC (10th)
1988–89	Jim Vukich	Curtis Fish	Bard Nordlund	Jim Pleasants	Jason Larway	1989 USMCC (gold); 1989 WMCC (10th)
1989–90	Bard Nordlund (fourth)	Doug Jones (skip)	Murphy Tomlinson	Tom Violette		1990 USMCC (gold); 1990 WMCC (7th)
1999–00	Tom Violette	Curt Fish	Bard Nordlund	Murphy Tomlinson	Doug Jones	2000 USMCC (??? th)
2004–05	Bard Nordlund	Tom Violette	Chris Pleasants	Bret Nordlund		
