= Frants Gufler =

Danish male curler and coach

- Curler ♂
- Born: 11 October 1957 (age 69); Copenhagen, Denmark

Team
- Curling club: Frederiksberg CC, Hvidovre CC, Hvidovre

Curling career
- Member Association: Denmark
- World Championship: 3 (1985, 1999, 2000)
- European Championship: 6 (1982, 1983, 1984, 1989, 2000, 2001)
- Olympic: 1 (2002)
Medal record
Curling
World Championships
| Bronze medal – third place | 1985 Glasgow |
European Championships
| Silver medal – second place | 2000 Oberstdorf |
Danish Men's Championship
| Gold medal – first place | 1985 |
| Gold medal – first place | 1999 |
| Gold medal – first place | 2000 |

Frants Gufler (born 11 October 1957) is a Danish curler and curling coach.

He is a 1985 World Men's bronze medallist.

He participated in the 2002 Winter Olympics where Danish men's team finished in seventh place.

== Teams ==
| Season | Skip | Third | Second | Lead | Alternate | Coach | Events |
|---|---|---|---|---|---|---|---|
| 1982–83 | Frants Gufler | Hans Gufler | Michael Sindt | Holger Slotsager | | | ECC 1982 (4th) |
| 1983–84 | Frants Gufler | Hans Gufler | Michael Sindt | Holger Slotsager | | | ECC 1983 (6th) |
| 1984–85 | Frants Gufler | Hans Gufler | Michael Sindt | Steen Hansen | | | ECC 1984 (6th) |
| 1984–85 | Hans Gufler (fourth) | Steen Hansen | Michael Sindt | Frants Gufler (skip) | | | DMCC 1985 (gold); WCC 1985 (bronze) |
| 1989–90 | Frants Gufler | Christian Thune | Niels Siggaard | Finn Nielsen | | | ECC 1989 (10th) |
| 1998–99 | Ulrik Schmidt | Lasse Lavrsen | Brian Hansen | Carsten Svensgaard | Frants Gufler | Bill Carey | DMCC 1999 (gold); WCC 1999 (6th) |
| 1999–00 | Ulrik Schmidt | Lasse Lavrsen | Brian Hansen | Carsten Svensgaard | Frants Gufler | Bill Carey | DMCC 2000 (gold); WCC 2000 (5th) |
| 2000–01 | Ulrik Schmidt | Lasse Lavrsen | Brian Hansen | Carsten Svensgaard | Frants Gufler | Bill Carey | ECC 2000 (silver) |
| 2001–02 | Lasse Lavrsen | Brian Hansen | Carsten Svensgaard | Frants Gufler | Ulrik Schmidt | Bill Carey | ECC 2001 (6th) |
| 2001–02 | Ulrik Schmidt | Lasse Lavrsen | Brian Hansen | Carsten Svensgaard | Frants Gufler | | WOG 2002 (7th) |

== Record as a coach of national teams ==
| Year | Tournament, event | National team | Place |
|---|---|---|---|
| 1995 | 1995 European Curling Championships | Denmark (men) | 9 |
| 1995 | 1995 European Curling Championships | Denmark (women) | 5 |
| 1996 | 1996 European Curling Championships | Denmark (men) | 5 |
| 1996 | 1996 European Curling Championships | Denmark (women) | 7 |
| 2001 | 2001 World Women's Curling Championship | Denmark (women) | 3rd place, bronze medalist(s) |
| 2003 | 2003 World Women's Curling Championship | Denmark (women) | 8 |
