= Gary Joraanstad =

American curler

- Curler ♂

Team
- Curling club: Granite CC, Seattle, WA

Curling career
- Member Association: United States
- World Championship: 1 (1987)
Medal record
Curling
United States Men's Championship
| Gold medal – first place | 1987 Lake Placid |

Gary M. Joraanstad (born c. 1946) is an American curler and 1987 United States men's champion.

== Personal life ==
His daughter is curler Nicole Joraanstad, multi-time United States women's champion and 2010 Olympian. At the time of the 1987 World Championship, he worked as a personnel supervisor. He is married and has two daughters. After living in Seattle, Joraanstad and his wife Debra moved to Heath, Ohio.

== Teams ==
| Season | Skip | Third | Second | Lead | Events |
|---|---|---|---|---|---|
| 1986–87 | Jim Vukich | Ron Sharpe | George Pepelnjak | Gary Joraanstad | 1987 USMCC (gold); 1987 WMCC (5th) |
