= Steen Hansen =

Danish male curler

- Curler ♂

Team
- Curling club: Hvidovre CC, Hvidovre, Frederiksberg CC

Curling career
- Member Association: Denmark
- World Championship: 4 (1977, 1981, 1983, 1985)
- European Championship: 2 (1978, 1984)
- Other appearances: World Junior Championships: 3 (1976, 1978, 1979)
Medal record
Curling
World Championships
| Bronze medal – third place | 1985 Glasgow |
European Championships
| Bronze medal – third place | 1978 Aviemore |
Danish Men's Championship
| Gold medal – first place | 1977 |
| Gold medal – first place | 1981 |
| Gold medal – first place | 1983 |
| Gold medal – first place | 1985 |

Steen Hansen is a Danish curler.

He is a 1985 World Men's bronze medallist.

== Teams ==
=== Men's ===
| Season | Skip | Third | Second | Lead | Events |
|---|---|---|---|---|---|
| 1975–76 | Tommy Stjerne | Oluf Olsen | Peter Andersen | Steen Hansen | DJCC 1976 (gold); WJCC 1976 (9th) |
| 1976–77 | Tommy Stjerne | Oluf Olsen | Steen Hansen | Peter Andersen | DMCC 1977 (gold); WCC 1977 (10th) |
| 1977–78 | Tommy Stjerne | Oluf Olsen | Steen Hansen | Peter Andersen | DJCC 1978 (gold); WJCC 1978 (8th) |
| 1978–79 | Tommy Stjerne | Oluf Olsen | Steen Hansen | Peter Andersen | ECC 1978 (bronze); DJCC 1979 (gold); WJCC 1979 (6th) |
| 1980–81 | Tommy Stjerne | Oluf Olsen | Steen Hansen | Peter Andersen | DMCC 1981 (gold); WCC 1981 (9th) |
| 1982–83 | Tommy Stjerne | Oluf Olsen | Steen Hansen | Peter Andersen | DMCC 1983 (gold); WCC 1983 (7th) |
| 1984–85 | Frants Gufler | Hans Gufler | Michael Sindt | Steen Hansen | ECC 1984 (6th) |
| 1984–85 | Hans Gufler (fourth) | Steen Hansen | Michael Sindt | Frants Gufler (skip) | DMCC 1985 (gold); WCC 1985 (bronze) |

=== Mixed ===
| Season | Skip | Third | Second | Lead | Events |
|---|---|---|---|---|---|
| 1986 | John Kjærulff | Astrid Birnbaum | Steen Hansen | Lone Kristoffersen | DMxCC 1986 (gold) |
