= Billy Shipstad =

American curler

- Curler ♂

Team
- Curling club: Broadmoor CC, Colorado Springs, CO

Curling career
- Member Association: United States
- World Championship: 1 (1983)
Medal record
Curling
United States Men's Championship
Gold medal – first place	1983 Colorado Springs

Bill Shipstad is an American curler.

Shipstad as second for Don Cooper team won the United States men's curling championship in 1983, defeating Bud Somerville in the final.

At the time of the 1983 World Championships, he was a student. As of 2003, he was the general manager of the Icearium in Knoxville, Tennessee.

== Teams ==
Season	Skip	Third	Second	Lead	Events
1982–83	Don Cooper	Jerry van Brunt Jr.	Billy Shipstad	Jack McNelly	USMCC 1983 (gold); WCC 1983 (6th)
