= Murphy Tomlinson =

American curler

- Curler

Curling career
- Member Association: United States
- World Championship: 2 (1988, 1990)
Medal record
Curling
United States Men's Championship
| Gold medal – first place | 1988 St. Paul |
| Gold medal – first place | 1990 Superior |

Murphy Tomlinson is an American curler and two-time national champion.

== Curling career ==
In 1988 Tomlinson played second on Doug Jones' national champion team; they went on to finish in tenth place at the World Championship. In 1990 Nordlund played one more time in Jones' team and again won gold at the National Championship, this time improving to seventh at World's.

== Teams ==
| Season | Skip | Third | Second | Lead | Alternate | Events |
|---|---|---|---|---|---|---|
| 1987–88 | Doug Jones | Bard Nordlund | Murphy Tomlinson | Mike Grennan | | 1988 USMCC (gold); 1988 WMCC (10th) |
| 1989–90 | Bard Nordlund (fourth) | Doug Jones (skip) | Murphy Tomlinson | Tom Violette | | 1990 USMCC (gold); 1990 WMCC (7th) |
| 1999–00 | Tom Violette | Curt Fish | Bard Nordlund | Murphy Tomlinson | Doug Jones | 2000 USMCC (??? th) |
