= Therese Studer =

German labour activist (1862–1931)

Therese Studer (22 September 1862 – 21 January 1931) was a German labour activist.

A street in Munich is named Therese-Studer-Straße in her honour.
