= Doug Jones (curler) =

American curler

- Curler ♂

Team
- Curling club: Granite CC, Seattle, WA

Curling career
- Member Association: United States
- World Championship: 3 (1988, 1990, 1992)
Medal record
Curling
World Championships
Bronze medal – third place	1992 Garmisch-Partenkirchen
United States Men's Championship
Gold medal – first place	1988 St. Paul
Gold medal – first place	1990 Superior
Gold medal – first place	1992 Grafton

Doug Jones is an American curler.

He is a 1992 World Men's bronze medallist and a three-times United States men's curling champion (1988, 1990, 1992).

== Awards ==
- USA Curling Male Athlete of the Year: 1990, 1992.

== Teams ==
=== Men's ===
Season	Skip	Third	Second	Lead	Events
1987–88	Doug Jones	Bard Nordlund	Murphy Tomlinson	Mike Grennan	1988 USMCC (gold); 1988 WMCC (10th)
1989–90	Bard Nordlund (fourth)	Doug Jones (skip)	Murphy Tomlinson	Tom Violette	1990 USMCC (gold); 1990 WMCC (7th)
1991–92	Doug Jones	Jason Larway	Joel Larway	Tom Violette	1992 USMCC (gold); 1992 WMCC (bronze)
1994–95	Doug Jones	Murray Beighton	Ken Trask	Tom Violette	

=== Mixed ===
Season	Skip	Third	Second	Lead	Events
1985	Doug Jones	Beth Bronger-Jones	Bob Anderson	Cheryl Hardy	USMxCC 1985 (gold)
