= Tom Violette =

American curler (born 1960)

- Curler ♂
- Born: October 26, 1960 (age 66)

Team
- Curling club: Granite CC, Seattle, WA

Curling career
- Member Association: United States
- World Championship: 2 (1990, 1992)
- Other appearances: World Senior Championships: 1 (2015)
Medal record
Curling
World Championships
Bronze medal – third place	1992 Garmisch-Partenkirchen
United States Men's Championship
Gold medal – first place	1990 Superior
Gold medal – first place	1992 Grafton
World Senior Championships
Gold medal – first place	2015 Sochi

Tom Violette (born October 26, 1960) is an American curler from Issaquah, Washington and Stevens Point, Wisconsin.

He is a 1992 World Men's bronze medallist, a two-time United States men's curling champion (1990, 1992), and a 2015 World Seniors gold medalist.

== Teams ==
Season	Skip	Third	Second	Lead	Alternate	Coach	Events
1989–90	Bard Nordlund (fourth)	Doug Jones (skip)	Murphy Tomlinson	Tom Violette			1990 USMCC (gold); 1990 WMCC (7th)
1991–92	Doug Jones	Jason Larway	Joel Larway	Tom Violette			1992 USMCC (gold); 1992 WMCC (bronze)
1994–95	Doug Jones	Murray Beighton	Ken Trask	Tom Violette			
1998–99	Jason Larway	Travis Way	Joel Larway	Tom Violette			
1999–00	Tom Violette	Curt Fish	Bard Nordlund	Murphy Tomlinson	Doug Jones		2000 USMCC (DNQ)
2003–04	Wes Johnson	Leon Romaniuk	Colin Hufman	Ryan Beighton	Tom Violette		2004 USMCC (13th)
2011–12	Tom Violette	Leon Romaniuk	Paul Lyttle	Steve Lundeen			
2014–15	Lyle Sieg	Tom Violette	Ken Trask	Steve Lundeen	Duane Rutan	Greg Violette	2015 USSCC (gold); 2015 WSCC (gold)
2015–16	Lyle Sieg	Tom Violette	Ken Trask	Steve Lundeen	Duane Rutan		2016 USSCC (silver)
2016–17	Lyle Sieg	Tom Violette	Ken Trask	Steve Lundeen	Duane Rutan		2017 USSCC (bronze)

== Personal life ==
Tom Violette started curling in 1974, when he was 14 years old.

His son Luc Violette is a curler too. He played for United States in four World Junior Championships and at the 2019 Winter Universiade.
