= 1990 World Men's Curling Championship =

- Host city: Västerås, Sweden
- Arena: Rocklundahallen
- Dates: April 1–7, 1990
- Winner: Canada
- Curling club: Avonlea CC, Toronto, Ontario
- Skip: Ed Werenich
- Third: John Kawaja
- Second: Ian Tetley
- Lead: Pat Perroud
- Alternate: Neil Harrison
- Finalist: Scotland (David Smith)

The 1990 World Men's Curling Championships was held at the Rocklundahallen in Västerås, Sweden from April 1–7. The men's winner team Canada skipped by Ed Werenich.

== Teams ==
| Canada | Denmark | Finland | Germany | Italy |
|---|---|---|---|---|
| Avonlea CC, Toronto Skip: Ed Werenich; Third: John Kawaja; Second: Ian Tetley; Lead: Pat Perroud; Alternate: Neil Harrison | Hvidovre CC, Hvidovre Skip: Tommy Stjerne; Third: Per Berg; Second: Peter Andersen; Lead: Ivan Frederiksen; Alternate: Anders Søderblom | Hyvinkää CC, Hyvinkää Skip: Jussi Uusipaavalniemi; Third: Jari Laukkanen; Second: Jori Aro; Lead: Marko Poikolainen; Alternate: Juhani Heinonen | EV Füssen, Füssen Skip: Andreas Kapp; Third: Florian Zörgiebel; Second: Cristopher Huber; Lead: Ulrich Schneider; Alternate: Michael Schäffer | Tofane CC, Cortina d'Ampezzo Skip: Andrea Pavani; Third: Fabio Alvera; Second: Franco Sovilla; Lead: Stefano Morona; Alternate: Stefano Zardini |
| Norway | Scotland | Sweden | Switzerland | United States |
| Snarøen CC, Oslo Skip: Eigil Ramsfjell; Third: Sjur Loen; Second: Niclas Järund; Lead: Morten Skaug; Alternate: Flemming Davanger | St. Martins CC, Perth Skip: David Smith; Third: Mike Hay; Second: Peter Smith; Lead: David Hay | Örnsköldsviks CK, Örnsköldsvik Skip: Lars-Åke Nordström; Third: Christer Ödling; Second: Peder Flemström; Lead: Peter Nenzén; Alternate: Anders Gidlund | Kloten CC, Kloten Skip: Daniel Model; Third: Beat Stephan; Second: Marc Brügger; Lead: Lukas Fankhauser | Granite CC, Seattle Skip: Doug Jones; Third: Bard Nordlund; Second: Murphy Tomlinson; Lead: Tom Violette |

== Round-robin standings ==
| Country | Skip | W | L |
|---|---|---|---|
| Denmark | Tommy Stjerne | 7 | 2 |
| Sweden | Lars-Åke Nordström | 7 | 2 |
| Scotland | David Smith | 7 | 2 |
| Canada | Ed Werenich | 7 | 2 |
| Norway | Eigil Ramsfjell | 5 | 4 |
| Switzerland | Daniel Model | 4 | 5 |
| United States | Doug Jones | 4 | 5 |
| Italy | Andrea Pavani | 2 | 7 |
| Finland | Jussi Uusipaavalniemi | 2 | 7 |
| Germany | Andy Kapp | 0 | 9 |

== Round-robin results ==
=== Draw 1 ===
| Sheet A | Final |
| Italy (Pavani) | 2 |
| Denmark (Stjerne) | 8 |

| Sheet B | Final |
| Finland (Uusipaavalniemi) | 4 |
| Norway (Ramsfjell) | 10 |

| Sheet C | Final |
| Scotland (Smith) | 5 |
| United States (Jones) | 3 |

| Sheet D | Final |
| Canada (Werenich) | 7 |
| Germany (Kapp) | 1 |

| Sheet E | Final |
| Sweden (Nordström) | 7 |
| Switzerland (Model) | 4 |

=== Draw 2 ===
| Sheet A | Final |
| Sweden (Nordström) | 11 |
| Finland (Uusipaavalniemi) | 1 |

| Sheet B | Final |
| United States (Jones) | 2 |
| Switzerland (Model) | 6 |

| Sheet C | Final |
| United States (Jones) | 4 |
| Switzerland (Model) | 7 |

| Sheet D | Final |
| Scotland (Smith) | 3 |
| Denmark (Stjerne) | 9 |

| Sheet E | Final |
| Norway (Ramsfjell) | 9 |
| Germany (Kapp) | 3 |

=== Draw 3 ===
| Sheet A | Final |
| Germany (Kapp) | 3 |
| Switzerland (Model) | 9 |

| Sheet B | Final |
| Denmark (Stjerne) | 6 |
| Canada (Werenich) | 7 |

| Sheet C | Final |
| Norway (Ramsfjell) | 7 |
| Sweden (Nordström) | 8 |

| Sheet D | Final |
| United States (Jones) | 8 |
| Italy (Pavani) | 7 |

| Sheet E | Final |
| Scotland (Smith) | 5 |
| Finland (Uusipaavalniemi) | 3 |

=== Draw 4 ===
| Sheet A | Final |
| Denmark (Stjerne) | 8 |
| Norway (Ramsfjell) | 2 |

| Sheet B | Final |
| Scotland (Smith) | 3 |
| Italy (Pavani) | 1 |

| Sheet C | Final |
| Finland (Uusipaavalniemi) | 4 |
| Switzerland (Model) | 5 |

| Sheet D | Final |
| Germany (Kapp) | 4 |
| Sweden (Nordström) | 5 |

| Sheet E | Final |
| Canada (Werenich) | 7 |
| United States (Jones) | 4 |

=== Draw 5 ===
| Sheet A | Final |
| Scotland (Smith) | 1 |
| Sweden (Nordström) | 3 |

| Sheet B | Final |
| Norway (Ramsfjell) | 6 |
| United States (Jones) | 3 |

| Sheet C | Final |
| Denmark (Blach) | 8 |
| Germany (Hege-Schöll) | 2 |

| Sheet D | Final |
| Denmark (Stjerne) | 8 |
| Canada (Werenich) | 2 |

| Sheet E | Final |
| Switzerland (Model) | 3 |
| Italy (Pavani) | 2 |

=== Draw 6 ===
| Sheet A | Final |
| Switzerland (Model) | 5 |
| Canada (Werenich) | 7 |

| Sheet B | Final |
| Italy (Pavani) | 7 |
| Germany (Hege-Schöll) | 1 |

| Sheet C | Final |
| United States (Jones) | 3 |
| Finland (Uusipaavalniemi) | 5 |

| Sheet D | Final |
| Norway (Ramsfjell) | 5 |
| Scotland (Smith) | 6 |

| Sheet E | Final |
| Denmark (Stjerne) | 6 |
| Sweden (Nordström) | 3 |

=== Draw 7 ===
| Sheet A | Final |
| Finland (Uusipaavalniemi) | 4 |
| Italy (Pavani) | 5 |

| Sheet B | Final |
| Switzerland (Model) | 4 |
| Denmark (Stjerne) | 7 |

| Sheet C | Final |
| Canada (Werenich) | 6 |
| Norway (Ramsfjell) | 4 |

| Sheet D | Final |
| Sweden (Nordström) | 5 |
| United States (Jones) | 6 |

| Sheet E | Final |
| Germany (Hege-Schöll) | 2 |
| Scotland (Smith) | 3 |

=== Draw 8 ===
| Sheet A | Final |
| United States (Jones) | 5 |
| Germany (Hege-Schöll) | 2 |

| Sheet B | Final |
| Canada (Werenich) | 6 |
| Sweden (Nordström) | 7 |

| Sheet C | Final |
| Switzerland (Model) | 4 |
| Scotland (Smith) | 5 |

| Sheet D | Final |
| Denmark (Stjerne) | 8 |
| Finland (Uusipaavalniemi) | 3 |

| Sheet E | Final |
| Italy (Pavani) | 4 |
| Norway (Ramsfjell) | 7 |

=== Draw 9 ===
| Sheet A | Final |
| Canada (Werenich) | 5 |
| Scotland (Smith) | 9 |

| Sheet B | Final |
| Germany (Hege-Schöll) | 3 |
| Finland (Uusipaavalniemi) | 6 |

| Sheet C | Final |
| Sweden (Nordström) | 3 |
| Italy (Pavani) | 6 |

| Sheet D | Final |
| Switzerland (Model) | 4 |
| Norway (Ramsfjell) | 9 |

| Sheet E | Final |
| United States (Jones) | 3 |
| Denmark (Stjerne) | 6 |

== Tiebreaker ==
| Team | Final |
| Finland (Uusipaavalniemi) | 7 |
| Italy (Pavani) | 6 |

== Playoffs ==
Semi-final
1 | Denmark | 4
4 | Canada | 5
2 | Sweden | 3
3 | Scotland | 5

Final
4 | Canada | 3
3 | Scotland | 1

1990 WCF Curling Championship
(Canada)
Canada
20th title
