= Urs Studer =

Swiss curler

- Curler ♂

Team
- Curling club: Bern-Wildstrubel CC, Bern

Curling career
- Member Association: Switzerland
- World Championship: 1 (1983)
Medal record
Curling
Swiss Men's Championship
Gold medal – first place	1983 Wildhaus

Urs Studer (born c. 1961) is a Swiss curler.

At the national level, he is a 1983 Swiss men's and 1982 Swiss mixed champion curler.

== Teams ==
=== Men's ===
Season	Skip	Third	Second	Lead	Events
1982–83	Bruno Binggeli	Urs Studer	Jürg Studer	Daniel Wyser	SMCC 1983 (gold)
1982–83	Urs Studer	Bruno Binggeli	Jürg Studer	Daniel Wyser	WCC 1983 (8th)

=== Mixed ===
Season	Skip	Third	Second	Lead	Events
1981–82	Urs Studer	Brigitte Leutenegger	Jürg Studer	Karin Leutenegger	SMxCC 1982 (gold)
