= Jim Pleasants =

American curler and coach

- Curler

Team
- Curling club: Granite CC, Seattle, Washington

Curling career
- Member Association: United States
- World Championship: 1 (1989)
Medal record
Curling
United States Men's Championship
| Gold medal – first place | 1989 Detroit |
United States Mixed Championship
| Gold medal – first place | 1999 Devils Lake |

James "Jim" Pleasants is an American curler and curling coach from Seattle, Washington.

As of 2012-2014 he was a President of United States Curling Association.

== Curling career ==
In 1989 Fish played third on Jim Vukich's team, they won US Men's Championship and placing tenth at World's. In 1999 team with him and his wife Jaynie Pleasants won US Mixed championship.

== Teams ==
=== Men's ===
| Season | Skip | Third | Second | Lead | Alternate | Events |
|---|---|---|---|---|---|---|
| 1988–89 | Jim Vukich | Curtis Fish | Bard Nordlund | Jim Pleasants | Jason Larway | 1989 USMCC (gold); 1989 WMCC (10th) |

=== Mixed ===
| Season | Skip | Third | Second | Lead | Events |
|---|---|---|---|---|---|
| 1998–99 | Ian Cordner | Dolores Cordner | James Pleasants | Jaynie Pleasants | 1999 USMxCC (gold) |

=== Mixed doubles ===
| Season | Female | Male | Events |
|---|---|---|---|
| 2009–10 | Jaynie Pleasants | James Pleasants | 2010 USMDCC (16th) |

== Record as a coach of national teams ==
| Year | Tournament, event | National team | Place |
|---|---|---|---|
| 2009 | 2009 Winter Universiade | United States (students men) | 8 |
