= Margaret Craig =

American artist

- Education: Biology Secondary Education, BS Art, MFA Painting from University of Wisconsin-Madison, MFA Printmaking from University of Texas at San Antonio
- Known for: Printmaking, Painting, Art

Margaret Craig is an American artist and printmaker based in San Antonio who invented a pressless etching technique. She holds a Master's in Painting from the University of Wisconsin-Madison, where she was introduced to etching by Frances Myers. She went on to study under Ken Little, Dennis Olsen and Kent Rush while working on her M.F.A. in Printmaking at the University of Texas at San Antonio. A degree in Biology influences numerous aspects of her work, which is exhibited in Texas, nationally in the USA, and internationally in Europe and Asia.

She is former Chair, and Professor Emeritus of Printmaking and Paper at the Southwest School of Art in San Antonio, TX.

== Artistic approach ==
Art Papers declared that "Margaret Craig has used the accidents and 'moments' of painting to explore the chaotic and whimsical." Informed by her biology degree and a healthy understanding of the experimental process, Craig synthesizes innovative techniques with the traditional from her painting and printmaking background, as well as other artistic disciplines. "Craig is interested in the natural processes of growth and erosion. Experimentation often results in irregularities, and the unexpected results bring delight to both maker and beholder." New Art Examiner described the work as evoking "an intensity which extends beyond the nostalgia and irony of its components." "Craig's ability to allow the chance operations of natural processes helps her create her finished product, and the pure aesthetic pleasure that each of her works provokes is their main subject." Her pieces are very much tied to process, a slow evolution of layers that culminates in environments and creatures that could be swimming in a drop of rainwater or thriving in an alien ecology. Bennett said that some of Craig's pieces "offer panoramic views of beautifully barren otherworlds, as if Craig were able to photograph the surface of Jupiter."

== Selected collections ==
Margaret Craig's artwork is in the permanent collections of many museums, including:

- Amity Foundation
- Brooklyn Art Library, Brooklyn, NY
- Center for Book Arts, New York, NY
- Chazen Museum of Art, Madison, WI
- John Michael Kohler Arts Center, Sheboygan, WI
- Judith K. and David J. Brodsky Center for Innovative Editions, Rutgers University, New Brunswick, NJ
- Margaret Pace Willson
- Museum of Texas Tech University, Artist Printmaker Teaching Collection, Lubbock, TX
- North Dakota State University, Fargo, ND
- Southern Graphics Council
- St. Lawrence University, Canton, NY
- Turku Art Museum, Turku, Finland
- University of Colorado, Special Collection, Boulder, Colorado
- University of Miami, Coral Gables, Florida
- University of Texas, San Antonio, TX
- Zayed University, Abu Dhabi, United Arab Emirates
