= Stefan Hasselborg =

Swedish male curler and coach

- Curler ♂
- Born: 30 April 1949 (age 77)

Team
- Curling club: Sollefteå CK, Sollefteå

Curling career
- Member Association: Sweden
- World Championship: 5 (1983, 1985, 1986, 1992, 1996)
- European Championship: 2 (1990, 1994)
Medal record
Curling
World Championships
Silver medal – second place	1985 Glasgow
European Championships
Gold medal – first place	1990 Lillehammer
Bronze medal – third place	1994 Sundsvall
Swedish Men's Championship
Gold medal – first place	1990
Gold medal – first place	1994

Stefan Hasselborg (born 30 April 1949) is a Swedish curler and curling coach.

He is a 1990 European champion and 1985 World championship silver medallist.

From 1998 until 2010 he was a national coach of the Swedish Curling Association (Swedish: Svenska Curlingförbundet).

In 1990 he was inducted into the Swedish Curling Hall of Fame.

== Personal life ==
He is from a well-known Swedish curling family; his younger brother is longtime teammate Mikael and Mikael's children are Anna (2018 Winter Olympics champion) and Marcus, and his own daughter Maria is also a curler.

== Teams ==
Season	Skip	Third	Second	Lead	Alternate	Events
1982–83	Stefan Hasselborg	Mikael Hasselborg	Hans Nordin	Lars Wernblom		WCC 1983 (4th)
1984–85	Stefan Hasselborg	Mikael Hasselborg	Hans Nordin	Lars Wernblom		WCC 1985 (silver)
1985–86	Stefan Hasselborg	Mikael Hasselborg	Hans Nordin	Lars Wernblom		WCC 1986 (4th)
1989–90	Mikael Hasselborg	Hans Nordin	Lars Vågberg	Stefan Hasselborg		SMCC 1990 (gold)
1990–91	Mikael Hasselborg	Hans Nordin	Lars Vågberg	Stefan Hasselborg		ECC 1990 (gold)
1991–92	Mikael Hasselborg	Hans Nordin	Lars Vågberg	Stefan Hasselborg	Lars-Åke Nordström (WCC)	WCC 1992 (7th)
1993–94	Mikael Hasselborg	Hans Nordin	Lars Vågberg	Stefan Hasselborg		SMCC 1994 (gold)
1994–95	Mikael Hasselborg	Hans Nordin	Lars Vågberg	Stefan Hasselborg	Lars-Åke Nordström (ECC)	ECC 1994 (bronze)
1995–96	Mikael Hasselborg	Stefan Hasselborg	Hans Nordin	Peter Eriksson	Lars-Åke Nordström (WCC)	WCC 1996 (5th)

== Record as a coach of national teams ==
Year	Tournament, event	National team	Place
1981	1981 World Men's Curling Championship	Sweden (men)	5
1990	1990 World Men's Curling Championship	Sweden (men)	3rd place, bronze medalist(s)
1996	1996 European Curling Championships	Sweden (men)	2nd place, silver medalist(s)
1997	1997 World Women's Curling Championship	Sweden (women)	5
1998	1998 European Curling Championships	Sweden (men)	1st place, gold medalist(s)
1998	1998 European Curling Championships	Sweden (women)	5
1999	1999 European Curling Championships	Sweden (men)	6
1999	1999 European Curling Championships	Sweden (women)	2nd place, silver medalist(s)
2000	2000 European Curling Championships	Sweden (men)	3rd place, bronze medalist(s)
2000	2000 European Curling Championships	Sweden (women)	1st place, gold medalist(s)
2001	2001 European Curling Championships	Sweden (men)	1st place, gold medalist(s)
2005	2005 European Curling Championships	Sweden (men)	2nd place, silver medalist(s)
2005	2005 European Curling Championships	Sweden (women)	1st place, gold medalist(s)
2006	2006 Winter Olympics	Sweden (men)	8
2006	2006 Winter Olympics	Sweden (women)	1st place, gold medalist(s)
2006	2006 World Women's Curling Championship	Sweden (women)	1st place, gold medalist(s)
2007	2007 World Men's Curling Championship	Sweden (men)	5
2008	2008 World Men's Curling Championship	Sweden (men)	10
2010	2010 Winter Olympics	Sweden (women)	1st place, gold medalist(s)
