= German Men's Curling Championship =

The German Men's Curling Championship (German: Deutsche Herren Meisterschaft) is the national championship of men's curling teams in Germany. It has been held annually since the 1965–1966 season, and is organized by the German Curling Association (German: Deutscher Curling Verband).

== List of champions and medallists ==
Team line-ups shows in order: fourth, third, second, lead, alternate (if exists), coach (if exists); skips marked bold.

Year	Champion	Runner-up	Bronze
1966	Münchener EV		
1967	Münchener EV		
1968	EC Bad Tölz		
1969	EC Bad Tölz		
1970	EC Oberstdorf		
1971	EC Bad Tölz		
1972	EC Oberstdorf		
1973	EC Bad Tölz		
1974	EC Oberstdorf		
1975	EC Bad Tölz		
1976	EC Bad Tölz		
1977	EC Bad Tölz		
1978	Münchener EV		
1979	Münchener EV		
1980	CC Schwenningen		
1981	CC Schwenningen		
1982	CC Schwenningen		
1983	CC Schwenningen		
1984	CC Schwenningen		
1985	CC Schwenningen		
1986	EV Füssen		
1987	EC Oberstdorf; Rodger Gustaf Schmidt	CC Schwenningen; Hans Dieter Kiesel	CC Schwenningen; Keith Wendorf
1988	SC Riessersee; Rainer Schöpp	EV Füssen; Roland Jentsch	CC Hamburg; Rodger Gustaf Schmidt
1989	EV Füssen; Roland Jentsch, Uli Sutor, Charlie Kapp, Thomas Vogelsang	CC Schwenningen	SC Riessersee
1990	EV Füssen; Andy Kapp, Florian Zörgiebel, Cristoph Huber, Uli Schneider, alternate: Michael Schäffer	SC Riessersee	CC Schwenningen
1991	EV Füssen; Andy Kapp, Florian Zörgiebel, Cristoph Huber, Uli Schneider	EV Füssen; Uli Kapp	EV Füssen; Roland Jentsch
1992	Münchener EV; Rodger Gustaf Schmidt, Wolfgang Burba, Hans-Joachim Burba, Bernhard Mayr, alternate: Martin Beiser	CC Füssen; Andreas Kapp	EC Oberstdorf; Dieter Kolb
1993	SG Münchener EV/EC Oberstdorf; Wolfgang Burba, Bernhard Mayr, Markus Herberg, Daniel Herberg	CC Füssen	CC Hamburg
1994	CC Füssen; Andreas Kapp, Uli Kapp, Michael Schäffer, Oliver Axnick, alternate: Holger Höhne	SG SC Riessersee/EC Oberstdorf	EC Oberstdorf
1995	CC Füssen; Andreas Kapp, Uli Kapp, Michael Schäffer, Oliver Axnick, alternate: Holger Höhne	SG SC Riessersee/EC Oberstdorf; Wolfgang Burba	SG SC Riessersee/EC Oberstdorf; Rainer Schöpp
1996	CC Hamburg; Johnny Jahr	CC Füssen; Andreas Kapp	CC Füssen; Roland Jentsch
1997	CC Füssen; Andreas Kapp	EC Oberstdorf; Daniel Herberg	SC Riessersee; Rainer Schöpp
1998	CC Füssen; Roland Jentsch	EC Oberstdorf; Daniel Herberg	CC Füssen; Andreas Kapp
1999	CC Füssen; Andreas Kapp	EC Oberstdorf; Daniel Herberg	CC Hamburg; Johnny Jahr
2000	CC Füssen; Andreas Kapp	EC Oberstdorf; Daniel Herberg	CC Füssen; Roland Jentsch
2001	CC Füssen; Andy Kapp, Uli Kapp, Oliver Axnick, Holger Höhne	CC Schwenningen; Andreas Lang, Richard Cook, Rainer Beiter, Sebastian Schweizer, alternate: Jörg Engesser	Baden-Hills Golf & Curling Club; Cristian Baumann, Alexander Baumann, Ingmar Fritz, Thomas Unterstab, alternate: Moritz Unterstab
2002	EC Oberstdorf; Sebastian Stock, Daniel Herberg, Stephan Knoll, Markus Messenzehl, alternate: Patrick Hoffman	CC Füssen; Andy Kapp	SC Riessersee; Rainer Schöpp, Jan-Peter Rehm, Vehbi Yanik, Helmar Erlewein
2003	CC Schwenningen/CCM; Andreas Lang, Rainer Beiter, Jürgen Beck, Sebastian Schweizer, alternate: Jörg Engesser	CC Füssen; Andy Kapp, Uli Kapp, Oliver Axnick, Holger Höhne, alternate: Andreas Kempf	EC Oberstdorf; Sebastian Stock, Daniel Herberg, Stephan Knoll, Markus Messenzehl, alternate: Patrick Hoffman
2004	EC Oberstdorf; Sebastian Stock, Daniel Herberg, Stephan Knoll, Markus Messenzehl, alternate: Patrick Hoffman	CC Füssen; Andy Kapp, Uli Kapp, Oliver Axnick, Holger Höhne, alternate: Andreas Kempf	CC Schwenningen; Andreas Lang, Rainer Beiter, Sebastian Schweizer, Jörg Engesser
.			
2013	Felix Schulze, Johnny Jahr, Peter Rickmers, Sven Goldemann	Daniel Herberg, Markus Messenzehl, Daniel Neuner, Andreas Kempf	Alexander Baumann, Manuel Walter, Sebastian Schweizer, Jörg Engesser
2014	Felix Schulze, Johnny Jahr, Christopher Bartsch, Sven Goldemann	Konstantin Kämpf, Daniel Neuner, Alexander Kämpf, Dominik Greindl, alternate: Sebastian Jacoby	Alexander Baumann, Manuel Walter, Sebastian Schweizer, Jörg Engesser, alternate: Marc Bastian
2015	Alexander Baumann, Manuel Walter, Sebastian Schweizer, Marc Bastian, alternate: Jörg Engesser	Felix Schulze, Christopher Bartsch, Peter Rickmers, Sven Goldemann	Wolfgang Burba, Hans-Joachim Burba, Mike Burba, Cristoph Schmidt
2016	Alexander Baumann, Manuel Walter, Marc Muskatewitz, Sebastian Schweizer	Wolfgang Burba, Matthias Zobel, Eric Richert, Mike Burba	Oliver Trevisiol, Peter Gaedeke, Julian Braun, Oliver Geissinger
.			

== See also ==
- German Women's Curling Championship
