= 2012 German Masters (curling) =

- Host city: Hamburg, Germany
- Arena: Curling Club Hamburg
- Dates: January 27–29
- Winner: (United States) Tyler George
- Curling club: Duluth CC, Duluth, Minnesota
- Skip: Tyler George
- Third: Christopher Plys
- Second: Rich Ruohonen
- Lead: Aanders Brorson
- Finalist: (Germany) Wolfgang Burba

The 2012 German Masters were held from January 27 to 29 at the Curling Club Hamburg in Hamburg, Germany as part of the 2011–12 World Curling Tour. The tournament was held in a round robin format. The purse for the tournament was €15,000.

== Teams ==
The teams are listed as follows:

Skip	Third	Second	Lead	Alternate	Locale
Christian Bangerter	Stefan Schori	Marcel Stöckli	Daniel Inversini	Fritz Egger	Switzerland
Alexander Baumann	Manuel Walter	Sebastian Schweizer	Jörg Engesser		Schwenningen, Switzerland
Andy Büttner	Erik Zimmermann	Kai Duschanek	Jerome Grasse		Geising, Germany
Julius Diekmann	Joachim Fenske	Reto Grimm	Felix Pilz		Hamburg, Germany
Tyler George	Chris Plys	Rich Ruohonen	Aanders Brorson		(United States) Duluth, Minnesota
Andy Lang (fourth)	Daniel Herberg (skip)	Markus Messenzehl	Daniel Neuner	Andreas Kempf	Füssen, Germany
Felix Schulze (fourth)	John Jahr (skip)	Peter Rickmers	Sven Goldeman	Christoph Daase	Germany
Andy Kapp (fourth)	Wolfgang Burba (skip)	Bernhard Mayr	Markus Herberg	Philip Seitz	Oberstdorf, Germany
Radek Klima	Tomas Valek	Tomáš Paul	Jan Samueli	Karel Klima	Czech Republic
Steffen Mellemseter	Markus Snøve Høiberg	Håvard Mellem	Markus Nedregotten	Stein Mellemseter	Norway
Rasmus Stjerne	Johnny Frederiksen	Mikkel Poulsen	Troels Harry	Lars Vilandt	Hvidovre, Denmark
Alexey Tselousov	Petr Dron	Alexander Badilin	Artur Razhabov	Aleksey Kamnev	Moscow, Russia
Andreas Unterberger	Markus Forejtek	Christian Roth	Marcus Schmitt		Austria
Michal Vojtus	Jakub Bares	Martin Hejhal	Martin Štěpánek	Libor Celoud	Prague, Czech Republic

== Round robin standings ==
Key
Teams to Playoffs
Teams to Tiebreakers

Pool A	W	L
(Switzerland) Christian Bangerter	1	1
(Germany) John Jahr	1	1
(Denmark) Rasmus Stjerne	1	1

Pool B	W	L
(United States) Tyler George	3	0
(Switzerland) Alexander Baumann	2	1
(Russia) Alexey Tselousov	1	2
(Austria) Andreas Unterberger	0	3

Pool C	W	L
(Germany) Daniel Herberg	3	0
(Germany) Julius Diekmann	2	1
(Czech Republic) Michal Vojtus	1	2
(Germany) Andy Büttner	0	3

Pool D	W	L
(Norway) Steffen Mellemseter	2	0
(Germany) Wolfgang Burba	1	1
(Czech Republic) Radek Klima	0	2

== Tiebreakers ==
Sheet A	Final
(Denmark) Rasmus Stjerne	9
(Czech Republic) Radek Klima	2

Sheet B	Final
(Germany) Wolfgang Burba	6
(Germany) John Jahr	3

Sheet C	Final
(Switzerland) Alexander Baumann	9
(Czech Republic) Michal Vojtus	2

Sheet D	Final
(Germany) Julius Diekmann	5
(Russia) Alexey Tselousov	7

== Playoffs ==
Quarterfinals
(Switzerland) Christian Bangerter	1
(Russia) Alexey Tselousov	4
(United States) Tyler George	8
(Switzerland) Alexander Baumann	2
(Germany) Daniel Herberg	4
(Germany) Wolfgang Burba	5
(Norway) Steffen Mellemseter	9
(Denmark) Rasmus Stjerne	6

Semifinals
(Russia) Alexey Tselousov	5
(United States) Tyler George	7
(Germany) Wolfgang Burba	6
(Norway) Steffen Mellemseter	3

Final
(United States) Tyler George	5
(Germany) Wolfgang Burba	4
