= 2013 German Masters (curling) =

- Host city: Hamburg, Germany
- Arena: Curling Club Hamburg
- Dates: January 25–27
- Winner: (Scotland) David Murdoch
- Skip: David Murdoch
- Third: Greg Drummond
- Second: Scott Andrews
- Lead: Michael Goodfellow
- Alternate: Tom Brewster
- Finalist: (Denmark) Rasmus Stjerne

The 2013 German Masters were held from January 25 to 27 at the Curling Club Hamburg in Hamburg, Germany as part of the 2012–13 World Curling Tour. The event was held in a round-robin format. In the final, David Murdoch of Scotland, skipping for Tom Brewster, defeated Rasmus Stjerne of Denmark with a score of 6–1.

== Teams ==
The teams are listed as follows:

Skip	Third	Second	Lead	Alternate	Locale
Evgeny Arkhipov	Sergey Glukhov	Timur Gadzhikhanov	Artur Ali	Dmitry Mironov	Moscow, Russia
Alexander Baumann	Manuel Walter	Sebastian Schweizer	Jörg Engesser		Baden, Germany
Maciej Cesarz	Adam Sterczewski	Łukasz Piworowicz	Tomasz Kierzkowski	Maciej Cylupa	Poland
Tony Angiboust (fourth)	Thomas Dufour (skip)	Lionel Roux	Wilfrid Coulot		Chamonix, France
Markus Forejtek	Felix Purzner	Marcus Schmitt	Martin Egretberger		Austria
Stefan Häsler	Christian Bangerter	Christian Roth	Jörg Lüthy	Thomas Rubin	Bern, Switzerland
Pascal Hess	Yves Hess	Florian Meister	Stefan Meienberg		Zug, Switzerland
Markus Høiberg	Steffen Walstad	Håvard Mellem	Magnus Nedregotten		Norway
Felix Schulze (fourth)	John Jahr (skip)	Christopher Bartsch	Sven Goldemann		Hamburg, Germany
Andy Kapp	Daniel Herberg	Markus Messenzehl	Daniel Neuner	Andreas Kempf	Germany
Aku Kauste	Jani Sullanmaa	Pauli Jäämies	Janne Pitko	Leo Mäkelä	Hyvinkää, Finland
Lukas Klima	Ondrej Hurtik	Krystof Chaloupek	Samuel Mokris	Michal Laznicka	Czech Republic
Mikkel Krause	Oliver Dupont	Mads Nørgaard	Dennis Hansen	Kenneth Jørgensen	Hvidovre, Denmark
David Murdoch	Greg Drummond	Scott Andrews	Michael Goodfellow	Tom Brewster	Aberdeen, Scotland
Gabor Riesz	Zsombor Rókusfalvy	Balázs Fóty	Gábor Fóty	Támas Szabad	Hungary
Jiří Snítil	Martin Snítil	Jindřich Kitzberger	Marek Vydra		Brno, Czech Republic
Rasmus Stjerne	Johnny Frederiksen	Mikkel Poulsen	Troels Harry	Lars Vilandt	Hvidovre, Denmark
Torkil Svensgaard	Martin Udh Gronbech	Morten Berg Thomsen	Daniel Dalgaard Abrahamsen		Hvidovre, Denmark
Alexey Tselousov	Alexey Stukalsky	Andrey Drozdov	Artur Razhabov	Petr Dron	Moscow, Russia
Markku Uusipaavalniemi	Jari Laukkanen	Tommi Häti	Joni Ikonen		Finland

== Round-robin standings ==
Final round-robin standings

Key
Teams to Playoffs

Pool A	W	L
(Norway) Markus Høiberg	3	1
(Russia) Alexey Tselousov	3	1
(Germany) John Jahr	2	2
(Finland) Aku Kauste	1	3
(Austria) Markus Forejtek	1	3

Pool B	W	L
(Switzerland) Pascal Hess	3	1
(Czech Republic) Jiří Snítil	3	1
(Denmark) Mikkel Krause	2	2
(Hungary) Gabor Riesz	1	3
(Poland) Maciej Cesarz	1	3

Pool C	W	L
(Scotland) David Murdoch	3	1
(Finland) Markku Uusipaavalniemi	3	1
(Czech Republic) Lukas Klima	2	2
(Germany) Alexander Baumann	1	3
(Switzerland) Stefan Häsler	1	3

Pool D	W	L
(Denmark) Rasmus Stjerne	3	1
(Russia) Evgeny Arkhipov	2	2
(France) Thomas Dufour	2	2
(Denmark) Torkil Svensgaard	2	2
(Germany) Andy Kapp	1	3

== Playoffs ==
Quarterfinals
(Norway) Markus Høiberg	3
(Switzerland) Pascal Hess	5
(Denmark) Rasmus Stjerne	5
(Finland) Markku Uusipaavalniemi	3
(Czech Republic) Jiří Snítil	7
(Russia) Alexey Tselousov	3
(Scotland) David Murdoch	6
(Russia) Evgeny Arkhipov	3

Semifinals
(Switzerland) Pascal Hess	2
(Denmark) Rasmus Stjerne	5
(Czech Republic) Jiří Snítil	1
(Scotland) David Murdoch	7

Final
(Denmark) Rasmus Stjerne	1
(Scotland) David Murdoch	6
