= Patrick Hoffman =

German curler (born 1974)

- Curler ♂
- Born: 25 July 1974 (age 52); Munich, Germany

Team
- Curling club: EC Oberstdorf

Curling career
- Member Association: Germany
- World Championship: 3 (2001, 2004, 2006)
- European Championship: 9 (1996, 1998, 1999, 2000, 2001, 2002, 2003, 2004, 2006)
- Olympic: 1 (2002)
Medal record
Curling
Representing Germany
World Championships
Silver medal – second place	2004 Gävle
European Championships
Gold medal – first place	2002 Grindelwald
Gold medal – first place	2004 Sofia
World Junior Championships
Silver medal – second place	1995 Perth
Bronze medal – third place	1996 Red Deer

Patrick Hoffman (born 25 July 1974 in Munich) is a German curler. He is a former World men's silver medallist and a two time European men's champion. He competed at the 2002 Salt Lake City Olympics on the German team that placed sixth with a 4-5 record. He played for Team Europe at 2004 Continental Cup of Curling.

== Teams ==
Season	Skip	Third	Second	Lead	Alternate	Coach	Events
1994–95	Daniel Herberg	Sebastian Stock	Stephan Wiedemann	Patrick Hoffman	Sebastian Linkemann		WJCC 1995 (silver)
1995–96	Sebastian Stock	Patrick Hoffman	Stephan Wiedemann	Sebastian Linkemann	Sebastian Jacoby		WJCC 1996 (bronze)
1996–97	Daniel Herberg	Björn Schröder	Stephan Knoll	Patrick Hoffman	Markus Messenzehl	Keith Wendorf	ECC 1996 (4th)
1998–99	Daniel Herberg	Sebastian Stock	Stephan Knoll	Patrick Hoffman	Markus Messenzehl	Keith Wendorf	ECC 1998 (6th)
1999–00	Daniel Herberg	Sebastian Stock	Stephan Knoll	Patrick Hoffman	Markus Messenzehl	Keith Wendorf	ECC 1999 (9th)
2000–01	Andy Kapp	Uli Kapp	Oliver Axnick	Holger Höhne	Patrick Hoffman	Dieter Kolb (ECC), Keith Wendorf (ECC, WCC)	ECC 2000 (6th); WCC 2001 (6th)
2001–02	Sebastian Stock	Daniel Herberg	Stephan Knoll	Markus Messenzehl	Patrick Hoffman	Keith Wendorf (ECC)	ECC 2001 (8th); OG 2002 (6th)
2002–03	Sebastian Stock	Daniel Herberg	Stephan Knoll	Markus Messenzehl	Patrick Hoffman	Uli Sutor	ECC 2002 (gold)
2003–04	Sebastian Stock	Daniel Herberg	Markus Messenzehl	Patrick Hoffman	Stephan Knoll	Uli Sutor	ECC 2003 (6th)
2003–04	Sebastian Stock	Daniel Herberg	Stephan Knoll	Markus Messenzehl	Patrick Hoffman	Uli Sutor	WCC 2004 (silver)
2004–05	Sebastian Stock	Daniel Herberg	Stephan Knoll	Markus Messenzehl	Patrick Hoffman	Markus Herberg	ECC 2004 (gold)
2005–06	Sebastian Stock	Daniel Herberg	Stephan Knoll	Markus Messenzehl	Patrick Hoffman		
2005–06	Sebastian Stock	Daniel Herberg	Markus Messenzehl	Patrick Hoffman	Bernhard Mayr	Dick Henderson	WCC 2006 (10th)
2006–07	Sebastian Stock	Daniel Herberg	Markus Messenzehl	Patrick Hoffman	Bernhard Mayr		ECC 2006 (4th)
2007–08	Sebastian Stock	Daniel Herberg	Markus Messenzehl	Patrick Hoffman	Bernhard Mayr		
2008–09	Sebastian Stock	Daniel Herberg	Markus Messenzehl	Patrick Hoffman			
