= Sebastian Schweizer =

German curler (born 1980)

- Curler ♂
- Born: 30 June 1980 (age 46)

Team
- Curling club: CC Schwenningen, Schwenningen

Curling career
- Member Association: Germany
- World Championship: 4 (2003, 2016, 2017, 2018)
- European Championship: 4 (2014, 2015, 2016, 2018)
- Other appearances: European Mixed Championship: 1 (2011), World Junior Championships: 1 (1999)
Medal record
Curling
European Mixed Championship
Silver medal – second place	2011 Tårnby
German Men's Championship
Gold medal – first place	2003
Gold medal – first place	2015 Hugelsheim
Gold medal – first place	2016 Schwenningen
Silver medal – second place	2004
Bronze medal – third place	2001
Bronze medal – third place	2013 Oberstdorf
Bronze medal – third place	2014 Hamburg

Sebastian Schweizer (born 30 June 1980) is a German curler.

At the national level, he is a three-time German men's champion curler (2003, 2015, 2016).

At the international level, he is a 2011 European mixed silver medallist.

== Teams ==
=== Men's ===
Season	Skip	Third	Second	Lead	Alternate	Coach	Events
1998–99	Andreas Lang	Rainer Beiter	Sebastian Schweizer	Stefan Klaiber	Jörg Engesser		WJCC 1999 (6th)
2000–01	Andreas Lang	Richard Cook	Rainer Beiter	Sebastian Schweizer	Jörg Engesser		GMCC 2001 (silver)
2002–03	Andreas Lang	Rainer Beiter	Jürgen Beck	Sebastian Schweizer	Jörg Engesser	Dick Henderson	WCC 2003 (9th)
2003–04	Andreas Lang	Rainer Beiter	Sebastian Schweizer	Jörg Engesser			GMCC 2004 (bronze)
2011–12	Alexander Baumann	Manuel Walter	Sebastian Schweizer	Jörg Engesser			
2012–13	Alexander Baumann	Manuel Walter	Sebastian Schweizer	Jörg Engesser			GMCC 2013 (bronze)
2013–14	Alexander Baumann	Manuel Walter	Sebastian Schweizer	Jörg Engesser	Marc Bastian		GMCC 2014 (bronze)
2014–15	Alexander Baumann	Manuel Walter	Marc Muskatewitz	Sebastian Schweizer	Jörg Engesser	Martin Beiser	ECC 2014 (8th)
2014–15	Alexander Baumann	Manuel Walter	Sebastian Schweizer	Marc Bastian	Jörg Engesser		GMCC 2015 (gold)
2015–16	Alexander Baumann	Manuel Walter	Marc Muskatewitz	Sebastian Schweizer	Daniel Herberg	Katja Schweizer	ECC 2015 (6th)
2015–16	Alexander Baumann	Manuel Walter	Marc Muskatewitz	Sebastian Schweizer	Daniel Rothballer	Thomas Lips	GMCC 2016 (gold); WCC 2016 (12th)
2016–17	Alexander Baumann	Manuel Walter	Daniel Herberg	Ryan Sherrard	Sebastian Schweizer	Thomas Lips	WCC 2017 (10th)
2017–18	Alexander Baumann	Manuel Walter	Daniel Herberg	Ryan Sherrard	Sebastian Schweizer	Martin Beiser	ECC 2017 (5th)
2017–18	Alexander Baumann	Manuel Walter	Daniel Herberg	Sebastian Schweizer	Ryan Sherrard	Martin Beiser	WCC 2018 (13th)
2018–19	Marc Muskatewitz	Sixten Totzek	Daniel Neuner	Ryan Sherrard	Sebastian Schweizer	Martin Beiser	ECC 2018 (4th)

=== Mixed ===
Season	Skip	Third	Second	Lead	Alternate	Events
2011–12	Alexander Baumann	Ann-Kathrin Bastian	Manuel Walter	Katja Weisser	Sebastian Schweizer, Josephine Obermann	EMxCC 2011 (silver)
