= Björn Schröder (curler) =

German and Swiss male curler and coach

- Curler ♂
- Born: 9 August 1968 (age 58)

Team
- Curling club: Biel-Touring CC, Biel

Curling career
- Member Association: Switzerland; Germany
- World Championship: 3 (1991, 1992, 1994)
- European Championship: 1 (1993)
- Other appearances: World Junior Championships: 1 (1990)
Medal record
Curling
World Championships
Gold medal – first place	1992 Garmisch-Partenkirchen
Bronze medal – third place	1994 Oberstdorf
European Championships
Silver medal – second place	1994 Sundsvall
Bronze medal – third place	1993 Leukerbad
Swiss Men's Championship
Gold medal – first place	1991 Engelberg
Gold medal – first place	1992 Flims
Gold medal – first place	1994 Biel/Bienne

Björn Schröder (born 9 August 1968) is a German and Swiss curler and curling coach.

He is a 1992 World Men's champion, 1994 World Men's bronze medallist and a three-time Swiss men's champion (1991, 1992, 1994).

== Teams ==
=== Men's ===
Season	Skip	Third	Second	Lead	Alternate	Coach	Events
1989–90	Björn Schröder	Mathias Zobel	Markus Herberg	Felix Ogger	Harold Waldvogel		WJCC 1990 (5th)
1990–91	Markus Eggler	Frédéric Jean	Stefan Hofer	Björn Schröder			SMCC 1991 (gold); WCC 1991 (5th)
1991–92	Markus Eggler	Frédéric Jean	Stefan Hofer	Björn Schröder			SMCC 1992 (gold); WCC 1992 (gold)
1993–94	Markus Eggler	Dominic Andres	Björn Schröder	Stefan Hofer	Andreas Schwaller		ECC 1993 (bronze)
1993–94	Markus Eggler	Frédéric Jean (SMCC); Dominic Andres (WCC)	Stefan Hofer	Björn Schröder	Martin Zürrer (WCC)		SMCC 1994 (gold); WCC 1994 (bronze)
1994–95	Hansjörg Lips	Stefan Luder	Peter Lips	Rico Simen	Björn Schröder	Michael Müller	ECC 1994 (silver)
1994–95	Markus Eggler	Dominic Andres	Stefan Hofe]	Björn Schröder			
1996–97	Daniel Herberg	Björn Schröder	Stephan Knoll	Patrick Hoffman	Markus Messenzehl	Keith Wendorf	ECC 1996 (4th)

=== Mixed ===
Season	Skip	Third	Second	Lead	Events
2015	Björn Schröder (fourth)	Nicole Strausak	Christian Durtschi (skip)	Karin Durtschi	SMxCC 2015 (4th)

== Record as a coach of national teams ==
Year	Tournament, event	National team	Place
2002	2002 European Curling Championships	Germany (women)	7
2010	2010 European Curling Championships	Netherlands (men)	10
2011	2011 European Curling Championships	France (men)	8
2012	2012 World Men's Curling Championship	France (men)	10
2012	2012 European Curling Championships	France (men)	8
2018	2018 European Curling Championships	Austria (men)	18
2019	2019 European Curling Championships (group C)	Austria (women)	21 (total); (bronze) (group C)
2019	2019 World Mixed Doubles Curling Championship	Austria (mixed doubles)	23
