= 2004 Continental Cup of Curling =

- Host city: Medicine Hat, Alberta
- Dates: November 25–28
- Winner: Team North America
Score Breakdown
Discipline	NA	Europe
Mixed Doubles	21	15
Women's Team	18	18
Men's Team	27	9
Singles	28	4
Women's Skins	48	82
Men's Skins	86	44
Total	228	172

The 2004 Continental Cup of Curling was held in Medicine Hat, Alberta from November 25 to 28. North America won its second title, defeating Team Europe 228–172.

== Teams ==
=== Europe ===
- (Germany) Sebastian Stock, Daniel Herberg, Stephan Knoll, Patrick Hoffman; EC Oberstdorf
- (Scotland) David Murdoch, Craig Wilson, Neil Murdoch, Euan Byers; Lockerbie CC
- (Sweden) Peja Lindholm, Tomas Nordin, Magnus Swartling, Peter Narup; Östersunds CK
- (Norway) Dordi Nordby, Linn Githmark, Marianne Haslum, Camilla Holth; Snarøen CC
- (Sweden) Anette Norberg, Eva Lund, Cathrine Lindahl, Anna Bergström; Härnösands CK
- (Switzerland) Luzia Ebnöther, Carmen Küng, Yvonne Schlunegger, Laurence Bidaud; CC Bern

=== North America ===
- (Canada) Mark Dacey, Bruce Lohnes, Rob Harris, Andrew Gibson; Mayflower CC
- (Canada) David Nedohin, Randy Ferbey, Scott Pfeifer, Marcel Rocque; Avonair CC
- (United States) Jason Larway, Doug Pottinger, Joel Larway, Bill Todhunter; Granite CC (Seattle)
- (Canada) Colleen Jones, Kim Kelly, Mary-Anne Arsenault, Nancy Delahunt; Mayflower CC
- (Canada) Marie-France Larouche, Karo Gagnon, Anne Lemay, Veronique Grégoire; Etchemin CC, St-Romauld, Victoria CC
- (United States) Patti Lank, Erika Brown, Nicole Joraanstad, Natalie Nicholson; Madison CC

== Mixed doubles ==
(Each game worth six points)

- Europe (Murdoch/Githmark) 10-5 North America (Jones/Lohnes)
- North America (Larway/Brown) 11-4 Europe (Lindholm/Lund)
- North America (Nedohin/Gagnon) 6-5 Europe (Stock/Ebnöther)
- North America (Dacey/Kelly) 9-4 Europe (Wilson/Nordby)
- Europe (Herberg/Küng) 7-7 North America (Pottinger/Larouche) (each team gets 3 points)
- Europe (Nordin/Norberg) 8-3 North America (Ferbey/Lank)

North America wins 21-15

== Women's team ==
(Each game worth six points)

- North America (Jones) 4-3 Europe (Nordby)
- Europe (Norberg) 6-4 North America (Lank)
- Europe (Ebnöther) 10-3 North America (Larouche)
- North America (Larouche) 9-4 Europe (Nordby)
- Europe (Norberg) 8-2 North America (Jones)
- North America (Lank) 6-5 (Ebnöther)

Tie 18-18

== Men's team ==
(Each game worth six points)

- Europe (Lindholm) 5-5 North America (Dacey) (each team gets 3 points)
- Europe (Stock) 5-4 North America (Larway)
- North America (Ferbey) 5-3 Europe (Murdoch)
- North America (Dacey) 6-5 Europe (Stock)
- North America (Ferbey) 7-6 Europe (Lindholm)
- North America (Larway) 5-3 Europe (Murdoch)

North America wins 27-9

== Singles ==
(Each game worth four points, eight bonus points awarded to top aggregate score)

- Küng (Europe) 14-12 Larouche (North America)
- Jones (North America) 13-12 Bergström (Europe)
- Lank (North America) 20-15 Haslum (Europe)
- Larway (North America) 19-13 Narup (Europe)
- Ferbey (North America) 21-17 Murdoch (Europe)
- Dacey (North America) 17-15 Stock (Europe)

North America wins 28-4

== Women's skins ==
(Each skin is worth one point)

- Europe (Nordby) 17-13 North America (Larouche)
- Europe (Ebnöther) 24-16 North America (Lank)
- Europe (Norberg) 41-19 North America (Jones)

Europe wins 82-48

== Men's skins ==
(Each skin is worth one point)

- Europe (Murdoch) 21-9 North America (Larway)
- North America (Dacey) 30-10 Europe (Stock)
- North America (Ferbey) 47-13 Europe (Lindholm)

North America wins 86-44

North America wins aggregate 228-172
