= Jürgen Beck =

Jürgen Beck may refer to:

- Jürgen Beck (curler)
- Jürgen Beck (politician)
