= Alexander Baumann (curler) =

German curler

- Curler
- Born: 28 May 1984 (age 42)

Team
- Curling club: Baden Hills G&CC, Rheinmünster
- Skip: Alexander Baumann
- Third: Ryan Sherrard
- Second: Daniel Neuner
- Lead: Sebastian Schweizer

Curling career
- Member Association: Germany
- World Championship: 3 (2016, 2017, 2018)
- European Championship: 4 (2014, 2015, 2016, 2017)
- Other appearances: World Junior Championships: 4 (2000, 2002, 2003, 2004), European Mixed Championship: 1 (2011)
Medal record
Curling
European Mixed Championship
Silver medal – second place	2011 Tårnby
World Junior Championships
Bronze medal – third place	2000 Geising
German Men's Championship
Gold medal – first place	2015 Hugelsheim
Gold medal – first place	2016 Schwenningen
Bronze medal – third place	2013 Oberstdorf
Bronze medal – third place	2014 Hamburg

Alexander Baumann (born 28 May 1984 in Rastatt, West Germany) is a curler from Baden-Baden, Germany.

Baumann qualified for his first World Championship in 2016 in Basel, Switzerland. They finished 1–10. He also qualified For the 2017 Ford World Men's Curling Championship in Edmonton, Alberta, where they finished 3-8 He skipped the Germans again at the 2018 World Men's Curling Championship, finishing in last place with a 1–11 record.

At the international level, he is a 2011 European Mixed Championship silver medallist and a 2000 World Junior Championship bronze medallist.

At the national level, he is a two time German men's champion curler (2015, 2016) and two time bronze medallist (2013, 2014).

== Teams ==
=== Men's ===
Season	Skip	Third	Second	Lead	Alternate	Coach	Events
1999–00	Christian Baumann	Alexander Baumann	Ingmar Fritz	Thomas Unterstab	Moritz Unterstab		WJCC 2000 (bronze)
2001–02	Christian Baumann	Alexander Baumann	Ingmar Fritz	Thomas Unterstab	Moritz Unterstab		WJCC 2002 (6th)
2002–03	Christian Baumann	Alexander Baumann	Ingmar Fritz	Thomas Unterstab	Patrick Frey		WJCC 2003 (7th)
2003–04	Alexander Baumann	Severin Walter	Ingmar Fritz	Moritz Unterstab	Thomas Unterstab		WJCC 2004 (8th)
2011–12	Alexander Baumann	Manuel Walter	Sebastian Schweizer	Jörg Engesser			
2012–13	Alexander Baumann	Manuel Walter	Sebastian Schweizer	Jörg Engesser			GMCC 2013 (bronze)
2013–14	Alexander Baumann	Manuel Walter	Sebastian Schweizer	Jörg Engesser	Marc Bastian		GMCC 2014 (bronze)
2014–15	Alexander Baumann	Manuel Walter	Marc Muskatewitz	Sebastian Schweizer	Jörg Engesser	Martin Beiser	ECC 2014 (8th)
2014–15	Alexander Baumann	Manuel Walter	Sebastian Schweizer	Marc Bastian	Jörg Engesser		GMCC 2015 (gold)
2015–16	Alexander Baumann	Manuel Walter	Marc Muskatewitz	Sebastian Schweizer	Daniel Herberg (ECC), Daniel Rothballer (WCC)	Katja Schweizer (ECC), Thomas Lips (WCC)	ECC 2015 (6th); GMCC 2016 (gold); WCC 2016 (12th)
2016–17	Alexander Baumann (fourth)	Manuel Walter	Daniel Herberg	Andy Kapp (skip)	Ryan Sherrard	Martin Beiser	ECC 2016 (5th)
2016–17	Alexander Baumann	Manuel Walter	Daniel Herberg	Ryan Sherrard	Sebastian Schweizer	Thomas Lips	WCC 2017 (10th)
2017–18	Alexander Baumann	Manuel Walter	Daniel Herberg	Ryan Sherrard	Sebastian Schweizer	Martin Beiser	ECC 2017 (5th); WCC 2018 (13th)

=== Mixed ===
Season	Skip	Third	Second	Lead	Alternate	Events
2011–12	Alexander Baumann	Ann-Kathrin Bastian	Manuel Walter	Katja Weisser	Sebastian Schweizer, Josephine Obermann	EMxCC 2011 (silver)

== Personal life ==
Baumann is a soldier, and he is single.
