= Hans-Joachim Burba =

German curler (born 1957)

- Curler ♂
- Born: 15 August 1957 (age 69)

Team
- Curling club: EC Oberstdorf

Curling career
- Member Association: Germany
- World Championship: 2 (1987, 1992)
- European Championship: 1 (1985)
- Other appearances: World Senior Curling Championships: 3 (2015, 2017, 2019)
Medal record
Curling
Representing Germany
World Championships
Silver medal – second place	1987 Vancouver
European Championships
Gold medal – first place	1985 Grindelwald
German Men's Championship
Gold medal – first place	1992
Bronze medal – third place	2015

Hans-Joachim Burba (born 15 August 1957) is a former German curler.

He is a former World men's runner-up (1987), European men's curling champion (1985) and German men's curling champion (1992; bronze in 2015).

His brother Wolfgang Burba is a former curler and curling coach, he was Hans-Joachim's longtime teammate.

== Teams ==
Season	Skip	Third	Second	Lead	Alternate	Coach	Events
1978–79	Roland Jentsch	Hans-Joachim Burba	Wolfgang Burba	Werner Kolb			WJCC 1979 (10th)
1985–86	Rodger Gustaf Schmidt	Wolfgang Burba	Johnny Jahr	Hans-Joachim Burba			ECC 1985 (gold); WCC CR 1985 (gold)
1986–87	Rodger Gustaf Schmidt	Wolfgang Burba	Johnny Jahr	Hans-Joachim Burba			WCC 1987 (silver)
1991–92	Rodger Gustaf Schmidt	Wolfgang Burba	Hans-Joachim Burba	Bernhard Mayr	Martin Beiser		GMCC 1992 (gold); WCC 1992 (9th)
2013–14	Marc Muskatewitz	Kevin Bold	Mike Burba	Christoph Schmidt	Hans-Joachim Burba		GMCC 2014 (4th)
2014–15	Wolfgang Burba	Hans-Joachim Burba	Mike Burba	Christoph Schmidt			GMCC 2015 (bronze)
2015	Wolfgang Burba	Hans-Joachim Burba	Christoph Möckel	Matthias Steiner		Anna Terekhova	WSCC 2015 (13th)
2017	Uwe Saile	Hans-Joachim Burba	Christoph Möckel	Jürgen Münch		Alexander Forsyth	WSCC 2017 (4th)
2019	Uwe Saile	Hans-Joachim Burba	Christoph Möckel	Rüdiger Kühlwein		Alexander Forsyth	WSCC 2019 (9th)
