= 2011 European Mixed Curling Championship =

- Host city: Tårnby, Denmark
- Arena: Tårnby Curling Club
- Dates: September 30–October 8
- Winner: Switzerland
- Skip: Thomas Lips
- Third: Manuela Siegrist
- Second: Martin Rios
- Lead: Manuela Netzer-Kormann
- Finalist: Germany (Alexander Baumann)

The 2011 European Mixed Curling Championship was held from September 30 to October 8 at the Tårnby Curling Club in Tårnby, Denmark. In the final, Switzerland, skipped by Thomas Lips, won their first title after a 9–3 defeat of Germany in seven ends. The Czech Republic picked up the bronze medal with a 7–6 win over home team Denmark in nine ends.

== Teams ==
=== Red Group ===
Scotland	Austria	Russia	Sweden	Spain
Skip: David Edwards Third: Kerry Barr; Second: Scott MacLeod; Lead: Louise Edwards	Skip: Christian Roth Third: Claudia Toth; Second: Florian Huber; Lead: Andrea Höfler	Skip: Alexander Kirikov Third: Victoria Makarshina; Second: Anton Kalalb; Lead: Anna Lobova; Alternates: Vadim Shkolnikov, Oxana Gertova	Skip: Göran Carlsson Third: Marie Persson; Second: Anders Eriksson; Lead: Hanna Maleus Larsson	Skip: Antonio de Molinedo Third: Ana Arce; Second: José Manuel Sangüesa; Lead: Irene Santiago; Alternate: Angel Garcia Aguirrezabal
Netherlands	Norway	Wales	Romania	
Skip: Mark Neeleman Third: Marianne Neeleman; Second: Wim Neeleman; Lead: Els Neeleman	Skip: Ole Hauge Third: Hilde Stenseth; Second: Thomas Moe; Lead: Anna Grethe Bremnes	Skip: Adrian Meikle Third: Lesley Carrol; Second: Andrew Tanner; Lead: Heather Russel; Alternate: Lindsay McKenna	Skip: Allen Coliban Third: Crina Monica Novac; Second: Bogdan Colceriu; Lead: Raluca Daiana Colceriu; Alternates: Bogdan Taut, Diana Butsucea	

=== Blue Group ===
Switzerland	Hungary	Denmark	Czech Republic
Skip: Thomas Lips Third: Manuela Siegrist; Second: Martin Rios; Lead: Manuela Netzer-Kormann	Skip: György Nagy Third: Ildiko Szekeres; Second: Gabor Eszöl; Lead: Orsolya Rokusfalvy; Alternates: Csilla Halasz, Zoltan Jakab	Skip: Mikael Qvist Third: Mona Sylvest Nielsen; Second: Niels Siggaard Andersen; Lead: Trine Qvist	Skip: Kryštof Chaloupek Third: Eliška Jalovcová; Second: David Jirounek; Lead: Luisa Illková; Alternate: Tomáš Paul
Latvia	Estonia	Belarus	Turkey
Skip: Ansis Regza Third: Evita Regza; Second: Renars Freidensons; Lead: Dace Regza	Skip: Erkki Lill Third: Maile Mölder; Second: Harri Lill; Lead: Kaja Lill-Tamm	Skip: Dmitry Kirillov Third: Alina Pauliuchyk; Second: Dzmitry Yarko; Lead: Ekaterina Kirillova; Alternates: Natalia Sviarzhinskaya, Suzanna Ivashyna	Skip: Öznur Polat Third: Ilhan Osmanagaoglu; Second: Ayşe Gözütok; Lead: Yusuf Ziya Bayraktutan; Alternate: Aysun Ergin, Muhammet Oguz Zengin

=== Green Group ===
Germany	England	Slovakia	France
Skip: Alexander Baumann Third: Ann Kathrin Bastian; Second: Manuel Walter; Lead: Katja Weisser; Alternates: Sebastian Schweizer, Josephine Obermann	Skip: Alan McDougall Third: Lana Watson; Second: Andrew Woolston; Lead: Suzie Law	Skip: Pavel Kocián Third: Daniela Matulová; Second: Pavol Pitoňák; Lead: Silvia Sýkorová	Skip: Lionel Roux Third: Hélène Grieshaber; Second: Xavier Bibollet; Lead: Candice Santacru; Alternate: Alain Contat
Finland	Ireland	Italy	Serbia
Skip: Jussi Uusipaavalniemi Third: Jaana Hämäläinen; Second: Paavo Kuosmanen; Lead: Kirsi Kaski	Skip: David Smith Third: Claire Darragh; Second: James Russell; Lead: Melanie Porter	Skip: Valter Bombassei Third: Chiara Olivieri; Second: Marco Constantini; Lead: Giorgia Casagrande; Alternates: Massimo Antonelli, Maria Gaspari	Skip: Djordje Neskovic Third: Dara Gravara-Stojanovic; Second: Goran Ungurovic; Lead: Dragana Simjanovic; Alternates: Marko Stojanovic, Tatjana Jeftic

== Round-robin standings ==
Final round-robin standings

Key
Teams to Playoffs
Teams to Post Round-Robin Challenge

Red Group	Skip	W	L
Austria	Christian Roth	7	1
Scotland	David Edwards	6	2
Netherlands	Mark Neeleman	5	3
Wales	Adrian Meikle	5	3
Russia	Alexander Kirikov	4	4
Spain	Antonio de Molinedo	4	4
Sweden	Göran Carlsson	2	6
Norway	Ole Hauge	2	6
Romania	Allen Coliban	1	7

Blue Group	Skip	W	L
Switzerland	Thomas Lips	7	0
Denmark	Mikael Qvist	5	2
Czech Republic	Krystof Chaloupek	5	2
Latvia	Ansis Regza	4	3
Hungary	György Nagy	4	3
Estonia	Erkki Lill	2	5
Belarus	Dmitry Kirillov	1	6
Turkey	Oznur Polat	0	7

Green Group	Skip	W	L
Germany	Alexander Baumann	6	1
Italy	Valter Bombassei	5	2
Finland	Jussi Uusipaavalniemi	5	2
England	Alan McDougall	4	3
France	Lionel Roux	4	3
Slovakia	Pavel Kocián	3	4
Ireland	David Smith	1	6
Serbia	Djordje Neskovic	0	7

== Round-robin results ==
All draw times are listed in Central European Time (UTC+01).

=== Red Group ===
==== Saturday, October 1 ====
Draw 1 20:00

Sheet 1	1	2	3	4	5	6	7	8	Final
Scotland (Edwards) 🔨	1	0	0	2	0	1	3	X	7
Austria (Roth)	0	1	0	0	1	0	0	X	2

Sheet 2	1	2	3	4	5	6	7	8	Final
Russia (Kirikov) 🔨	0	0	0	2	5	2	2	X	11
Sweden (Carlsson)	1	1	2	0	0	0	0	X	4

Sheet 3	1	2	3	4	5	6	7	8	Final
Netherlands (Neeleman)	0	1	0	1	0	3	0	X	5
Spain (de Molinedo) 🔨	3	0	2	0	2	0	1	X	8

Sheet 4	1	2	3	4	5	6	7	8	9	Final
Wales (Meikle) 🔨	1	0	1	0	0	3	2	0	1	8
Norway (Hauge)	0	2	0	2	1	0	0	2	0	7

==== Sunday, October 2 ====
Draw 3 08:30

Sheet 1	1	2	3	4	5	6	7	8	Final
Romania (Coliban) 🔨	1	1	0	1	2	0	1	2	8
Norway (Hauge)	0	0	2	0	0	4	0	0	6

Sheet 2	1	2	3	4	5	6	7	8	Final
Netherlands (Neeleman) 🔨	1	1	2	1	2	0	0	X	7
Wales (Meikle)	0	0	0	0	0	1	1	X	2

Sheet 3	1	2	3	4	5	6	7	8	Final
Austria (Roth)	0	0	0	2	1	1	2	X	6
Sweden (Carlsson) 🔨	1	1	2	0	0	0	0	X	4

Sheet 4	1	2	3	4	5	6	7	8	Final
Russia (Kirikov)	0	0	0	3	4	0	4	X	11
Spain (de Molinedo) 🔨	1	1	0	0	0	1	0	X	3

==== Monday, October 3 ====
Draw 5 16:00

Sheet 1	1	2	3	4	5	6	7	8	Final
Austria (Roth)	1	0	2	1	1	2	X	X	7
Spain (de Molinedo) 🔨	0	1	0	0	0	0	X	X	1

Sheet 2	1	2	3	4	5	6	7	8	9	Final
Sweden (Carlsson)	1	1	0	0	2	0	2	0	1	7
Norway (Hauge) 🔨	0	0	2	1	0	1	0	2	0	6

Sheet 3	1	2	3	4	5	6	7	8	Final
Scotland (Edwards)	1	0	2	0	0	2	0	X	5
Wales (Meikle) 🔨	0	1	0	1	0	0	1	X	3

Sheet 4	1	2	3	4	5	6	7	8	Final
Netherlands (Neeleman) 🔨	4	1	2	1	1	0	3	X	12
Romania (Coliban)	0	0	0	0	0	2	0	X	2

==== Tuesday, October 4 ====
Draw 6 12:00

Sheet 6	1	2	3	4	5	6	7	8	Final
Russia (Kirikov)	0	0	0	3	0	0	1	X	4
Wales (Meikle) 🔨	1	0	2	0	1	2	0	X	6

Sheet 7	1	2	3	4	5	6	7	8	Final
Scotland (Edwards) 🔨	1	0	2	0	2	0	0	0	5
Netherlands (Neeleman)	0	2	0	1	0	1	1	1	6

Draw 7 19:30

Sheet 6	1	2	3	4	5	6	7	8	Final
Austria (Roth) 🔨	2	1	1	0	2	1	X	X	7
Norway (Hauge)	0	0	0	0	0	0	X	X	0

Sheet 7	1	2	3	4	5	6	7	8	Final
Sweden (Carlsson)	7	2	2	0	0	4	X	X	15
Romania (Coliban)	0	0	0	3	1	0	X	X	4

==== Wednesday, October 5 ====
Draw 9 12:00

Sheet 6	1	2	3	4	5	6	7	8	Final
Sweden (Carlsson)	0	1	0	0	0	1	0	X	2
Scotland (Edwards) 🔨	2	0	2	0	1	0	1	X	6

Sheet 7	1	2	3	4	5	6	7	8	Final
Spain (de Molinedo)	0	2	0	0	0	3	0	1	6
Wales (Meikle) 🔨	2	0	0	3	1	1	1	0	8

Draw 10 16:00

Sheet 6	1	2	3	4	5	6	7	8	Final
Russia (Kirikov) 🔨	0	2	3	0	0	0	2	X	7
Netherlands (Neeleman)	0	0	0	1	1	1	0	X	3

Sheet 7	1	2	3	4	5	6	7	8	Final
Romania (Coliban) 🔨	1	0	0	0	0	0	X	X	1
Austria (Roth)	0	1	2	1	2	4	X	X	10

==== Thursday, October 6 ====
Draw 12 08:30

Sheet 1	1	2	3	4	5	6	7	8	Final
Norway (Hauge) 🔨	1	0	1	0	1	0	0	X	3
Netherlands (Neeleman)	0	2	0	1	0	2	0	X	5

Sheet 2	1	2	3	4	5	6	7	8	Final
Wales (Meikle) 🔨	1	0	2	0	3	1	2	X	9
Sweden (Carlsson)	0	3	0	1	0	0	0	X	4

Sheet 3	1	2	3	4	5	6	7	8	Final
Spain (de Molinedo)	1	2	0	0	4	0	1	1	9
Romania (Coliban) 🔨	0	0	2	2	0	2	0	0	6

Sheet 4	1	2	3	4	5	6	7	8	Final
Scotland (Edwards)	0	3	0	0	1	0	0	1	5
Russia (Kirikov) 🔨	2	0	0	1	0	0	1	0	4

Draw 14 16:00

Sheet 1	1	2	3	4	5	6	7	8	Final
Wales (Meikle)	1	0	2	0	5	1	0	X	9
Romania (Coliban) 🔨	0	2	0	1	0	0	1	X	4

Sheet 2	1	2	3	4	5	6	7	8	Final
Spain (de Molinedo)	1	0	0	1	1	0	0	X	3
Scotland (Edwards) 🔨	0	1	1	0	0	2	2	X	6

Sheet 3	1	2	3	4	5	6	7	8	Final
Norway (Hauge)	0	1	2	0	2	0	1	1	7
Russia (Kirikov) 🔨	2	0	0	2	0	1	0	0	5

Sheet 4	1	2	3	4	5	6	7	8	Final
Netherlands (Neeleman)	0	1	0	1	0	0	1	0	3
Austria (Roth) 🔨	1	0	1	0	0	2	0	3	7

==== Friday, October 7 ====
Draw 16 08:30

Sheet 1	1	2	3	4	5	6	7	8	Final
Spain (de Molinedo) 🔨	1	1	0	2	0	1	0	2	7
Sweden (Carlsson)	0	0	3	0	0	0	1	0	4

Sheet 2	1	2	3	4	5	6	7	8	Final
Romania (Coliban)	0	0	0	1	0	0	X	X	1
Russia (Kirikov) 🔨	2	2	2	0	5	1	X	X	12

Sheet 3	1	2	3	4	5	6	7	8	Final
Wales (Meikle)	0	1	0	1	0	1	0	X	0
Austria (Roth) 🔨	0	0	2	0	1	0	3	X	6

Sheet 4	1	2	3	4	5	6	7	8	9	Final
Norway (Hauge) 🔨	1	0	1	0	0	2	0	0	1	5
Scotland (Edwards)	0	1	0	1	1	0	0	1	0	4

Draw 18 16:00

Sheet 1	1	2	3	4	5	6	7	8	Final
Austria (Roth) 🔨	3	0	3	0	1	1	X	X	8
Russia (Kirikov)	0	1	0	1	0	0	X	X	2

Sheet 2	1	2	3	4	5	6	7	8	Final
Norway (Hauge)	0	1	0	0	1	0	1	0	3
Spain (de Molinedo) 🔨	1	0	0	2	0	1	0	2	6

Sheet 3	1	2	3	4	5	6	7	8	Final
Romania (Coliban) 🔨	3	0	1	0	1	0	1	1	7
Scotland (Edwards)	0	2	0	3	0	3	0	0	8

Sheet 4	1	2	3	4	5	6	7	8	Final
Sweden (Carlsson) 🔨	1	0	0	1	1	0	2	0	5
Netherlands (Neeleman)	0	2	3	0	0	1	0	2	8

=== Blue Group ===
==== Sunday, October 2 ====
Draw 2 08:30

Sheet 6	1	2	3	4	5	6	7	8	Final
Switzerland (Lips) 🔨	0	1	0	0	2	0	2	1	6
Hungary (Nagy)	0	0	1	2	0	2	0	0	4

Sheet 7	1	2	3	4	5	6	7	8	Final
Denmark (Qvist) 🔨	0	2	2	1	0	1	2	X	8
Czech Republic (Chaloupek)	0	0	0	0	1	0	0	X	1

Draw 3 16:00

Sheet 6	1	2	3	4	5	6	7	8	Final
Latvia (Regza) 🔨	1	0	0	2	3	0	0	1	7
Estonia (Lill)	0	1	1	0	0	2	1	0	5

Sheet 7	1	2	3	4	5	6	7	8	Final
Belarus (Kirillov)	2	0	1	0	3	2	X	X	8
Turkey (Polat) 🔨	0	1	0	2	0	0	X	X	3

==== Monday, October 3 ====
Draw 4 08:30

Sheet 1	1	2	3	4	5	6	7	8	Final
Estonia (Lill) 🔨	2	1	0	2	0	1	X	X	6
Turkey (Polat)	0	0	1	0	1	0	X	X	2

Sheet 2	1	2	3	4	5	6	7	8	Final
Latvia (Regza)	1	0	1	1	0	1	0	2	6
Belarus (Kirillov) 🔨	0	2	0	0	1	0	0	0	3

Sheet 3	1	2	3	4	5	6	7	8	Final
Hungary (Nagy) 🔨	0	0	1	0	2	0	1	1	5
Czech Republic (Chaloupek)	2	1	0	2	0	1	0	0	6

Sheet 4	1	2	3	4	5	6	7	8	Final
Switzerland (Lips)	0	1	0	1	3	0	0	2	7
Denmark (Qvist) 🔨	2	0	2	0	0	1	0	0	5

==== Tuesday, October 4 ====
Draw 7 19:30

Sheet 1	1	2	3	4	5	6	7	8	9	Final
Latvia (Regza)	0	1	1	0	0	0	2	1	0	5
Czech Republic (Chaloupek) 🔨	0	0	0	3	0	2	0	0	2	7

Sheet 2	1	2	3	4	5	6	7	8	Final
Switzerland (Lips)	0	2	1	0	2	0	2	X	7
Turkey (Polat) 🔨	1	0	0	1	0	1	0	X	3

Sheet 3	1	2	3	4	5	6	7	8	Final
Belarus (Kirillov)	0	0	0	1	0	1	0	X	2
Denmark (Qvist) 🔨	5	1	1	0	3	0	1	X	11

Sheet 4	1	2	3	4	5	6	7	8	Final
Hungary (Nagy) 🔨	2	1	1	0	0	1	0	1	6
Estonia (Lill)	0	0	0	3	1	0	1	0	5

==== Wednesday, October 5 ====
Draw 8 08:30

Sheet 1	1	2	3	4	5	6	7	8	Final
Denmark (Qvist) 🔨	1	1	1	0	1	0	1	X	5
Estonia (Lill)	0	0	0	1	0	2	0	X	3

Sheet 2	1	2	3	4	5	6	7	8	Final
Belarus (Kirillov) 🔨	0	0	1	0	0	1	0	X	2
Hungary (Nagy)	1	2	0	0	5	0	1	X	9

Sheet 3	1	2	3	4	5	6	7	8	Final
Switzerland (Lips) 🔨	0	3	0	0	2	2	X	X	7
Latvia (Regza)	0	0	1	0	0	0	X	X	1

Sheet 4	1	2	3	4	5	6	7	8	Final
Turkey (Polat) 🔨	1	0	2	0	1	0	X	X	4
Czech Republic (Chaloupek)	0	1	0	2	0	6	X	X	9

Draw 10 16:00

Sheet 1	1	2	3	4	5	6	7	8	Final
Belarus (Kirillov)	0	0	1	1	0	1	1	X	0
Switzerland (Lips) 🔨	3	1	0	0	2	0	0	X	6

Sheet 2	1	2	3	4	5	6	7	8	9	Final
Czech Republic (Chaloupek)	0	0	0	2	0	0	1	0	2	5
Estonia (Lill) 🔨	0	0	1	0	1	0	0	1	0	3

Sheet 3	1	2	3	4	5	6	7	8	Final
Denmark (Qvist)	2	0	3	0	2	0	X	X	7
Turkey (Polat) 🔨	0	1	0	1	0	0	X	X	2

Sheet 4	1	2	3	4	5	6	7	8	9	Final
Latvia (Regza) 🔨	1	0	1	0	0	0	1	1	2	6
Hungary (Nagy)	0	1	0	1	1	1	0	0	0	4

==== Thursday, October 6 ====
Draw 13 12:00

Sheet 6	1	2	3	4	5	6	7	8	Final
Hungary (Nagy)	0	0	0	1	0	1	0	2	4
Denmark (Qvist) 🔨	0	0	0	0	1	0	2	0	3

Sheet 7	1	2	3	4	5	6	7	8	Final
Turkey (Polat)	0	0	0	0	0	0	0	0	0
Latvia (Regza) 🔨	0	0	0	0	0	1	0	0	1

Draw 15 19:30

Sheet 6	1	2	3	4	5	6	7	8	Final
Czech Republic (Chaloupek)	0	1	0	0	0	1	0	X	2
Switzerland (Lips) 🔨	1	0	0	0	2	0	2	X	5

Sheet 7	1	2	3	4	5	6	7	8	Final
Estonia (Lill)	0	0	5	0	0	1	2	X	8
Belarus (Kirillov) 🔨	1	1	0	1	2	0	0	X	5

==== Friday, October 7 ====
Draw 16 8:30

Sheet 6	1	2	3	4	5	6	7	8	Final
Czech Republic (Chaloupek) 🔨	3	0	0	1	2	3	X	X	9
Belarus (Kirillov)	0	2	1	0	0	0	X	X	3

Sheet 7	1	2	3	4	5	6	7	8	Final
Estonia (Lill) 🔨	0	1	0	0	1	0	X	X	2
Switzerland (Lips)	1	0	2	1	0	1	X	X	5

Draw 18 16:00

Sheet 6	1	2	3	4	5	6	7	8	9	Final
Turkey (Polat) 🔨	3	1	0	1	0	1	0	0	0	6
Hungary (Nagy)	0	0	1	0	3	0	1	1	1	7

Sheet 7	1	2	3	4	5	6	7	8	Final
Denmark (Qvist) 🔨	2	1	2	0	3	0	X	X	8
Latvia (Regza)	0	0	0	1	0	1	X	X	2

=== Green Group ===
==== Sunday, October 2 ====
Draw 2 08:30

Sheet 1	1	2	3	4	5	6	7	8	Final
Germany (Baumann) 🔨	0	3	0	2	0	0	1	1	7
England (McDougall)	1	0	1	0	1	1	0	0	4

Sheet 2	1	2	3	4	5	6	7	8	Final
Slovakia (Kocián) 🔨	0	0	1	1	0	2	0	0	4
France (Roux)	0	1	0	0	1	0	3	2	7

Sheet 3	1	2	3	4	5	6	7	8	Final
Finland (Uusipaavalniemi) 🔨	5	0	1	0	4	0	2	X	12
Ireland (Smith)	0	1	0	1	0	1	0	X	3

Sheet 4	1	2	3	4	5	6	7	8	Final
Italy (Bombassei) 🔨	2	0	1	4	2	0	X	X	9
Serbia (Neskovic)	0	1	0	0	0	1	X	X	2

==== Monday, October 3 ====
Draw 4 14:30

Sheet 6	1	2	3	4	5	6	7	8	Final
Ireland (Smith)	0	2	1	1	3	2	X	X	9
Serbia (Neskovic) 🔨	1	0	0	0	0	0	X	X	1

Sheet 7	1	2	3	4	5	6	7	8	Final
Finland (Uusipaavalniemi) 🔨	0	0	1	0	0	3	0	0	4
Italy (Bombassei)	1	0	0	1	2	0	1	1	6

Draw 5 16:00

Sheet 6	1	2	3	4	5	6	7	8	Final
England (McDougall)	0	0	0	0	2	0	2	3	7
France (Roux) 🔨	1	0	0	0	0	2	0	0	3

Sheet 7	1	2	3	4	5	6	7	8	Final
Germany (Baumann) 🔨	0	2	0	1	0	3	2	X	8
Slovakia (Kocián)	1	0	1	0	1	0	0	X	3

==== Tuesday, October 4 ====
Draw 6 12:00

Sheet 1	1	2	3	4	5	6	7	8	9	Final
Finland (Uusipaavalniemi) 🔨	3	0	0	3	0	0	1	1	0	8
France (Roux)	0	2	1	0	3	2	0	0	1	9

Sheet 2	1	2	3	4	5	6	7	8	Final
Germany (Baumann) 🔨	1	0	2	1	0	3	X	X	7
Serbia (Neskovic)	0	1	0	0	2	0	X	X	3

Sheet 3	1	2	3	4	5	6	7	8	9	Final
Italy (Bombassei) 🔨	1	0	0	1	2	0	1	0	2	7
Slovakia (Kocián)	0	1	2	0	0	1	0	1	0	5

Sheet 4	1	2	3	4	5	6	7	8	Final
England (McDougall) 🔨	2	0	0	2	1	1	0	X	6
Ireland (Smith)	0	0	2	0	0	0	2	X	4

==== Wednesday, October 5 ====
Draw 9 12:00

Sheet 1	1	2	3	4	5	6	7	8	Final
Slovakia (Kocián)	0	2	0	0	0	0	5	2	9
Ireland (Smith) 🔨	2	0	1	1	1	1	0	0	6

Sheet 2	1	2	3	4	5	6	7	8	Final
Italy (Bombassei)	0	0	1	0	1	0	0	X	2
England (McDougall) 🔨	1	2	0	1	0	1	1	X	6

Sheet 3	1	2	3	4	5	6	7	8	9	Final
Germany (Baumann) 🔨	0	1	2	0	1	0	0	0	0	4
Finland (Uusipaavalniemi)	1	0	0	1	0	0	1	1	1	5

Sheet 4	1	2	3	4	5	6	7	8	Final
Serbia (Neskovic)	0	1	0	0	0	2	0	X	3
France (Roux) 🔨	2	0	3	1	2	0	1	X	9

Draw 11 19:30

Sheet 1	1	2	3	4	5	6	7	8	Final
Italy (Bombassei)	0	1	0	1	1	0	X	X	3
Germany (Baumann) 🔨	5	0	1	0	0	4	X	X	10

Sheet 2	1	2	3	4	5	6	7	8	Final
France (Roux) 🔨	2	0	0	3	0	1	0	X	6
Ireland (Smith)	0	1	1	0	1	0	0	X	3

Sheet 3	1	2	3	4	5	6	7	8	Final
Slovakia (Kocián) 🔨	0	6	0	3	0	3	X	X	12
Serbia (Neskovic)	0	0	1	0	1	0	X	X	2

Sheet 4	1	2	3	4	5	6	7	8	Final
Finland (Uusipaavalniemi) 🔨	2	0	0	1	0	0	2	2	7
England (McDougall)	0	1	1	0	2	1	0	0	5

==== Thursday, October 6 ====
Draw 12 08:30

Sheet 6	1	2	3	4	5	6	7	8	Final
England (McDougall) 🔨	2	0	1	0	0	0	0	0	3
Slovakia (Kocián)	0	1	0	1	0	1	0	1	4

Sheet 7	1	2	3	4	5	6	7	8	Final
Serbia (Neskovic)	0	0	0	0	1	0	X	X	1
Finland (Uusipaavalniemi) 🔨	2	1	0	1	0	3	X	X	7

Draw 14 16:00

Sheet 6	1	2	3	4	5	6	7	8	Final
France (Roux)	0	0	0	1	0	0	X	X	1
Germany (Baumann) 🔨	1	0	1	0	1	3	X	X	6

Sheet 7	1	2	3	4	5	6	7	8	9	Final
Ireland (Smith) 🔨	0	2	0	0	1	1	3	0	0	7
Italy (Bombassei)	1	0	2	2	0	0	0	2	1	8

==== Friday, October 7 ====
Draw 17 12:00

Sheet 1	1	2	3	4	5	6	7	8	Final
France (Roux) 🔨	0	1	0	0	1	0	2	0	4
Italy (Bombassei)	0	0	2	1	0	1	0	1	5

Sheet 2	1	2	3	4	5	6	7	8	Final
Ireland (Smith)	0	0	2	0	0	1	0	X	3
Germany (Baumann) 🔨	1	2	0	1	2	0	1	X	7

Sheet 3	1	2	3	4	5	6	7	8	Final
Serbia (Neskovic) 🔨	0	1	0	0	1	0	X	X	2
England (McDougall)	2	0	2	1	0	1	X	X	6

Sheet 4	1	2	3	4	5	6	7	8	Final
Slovakia (Kocián)	0	2	1	1	0	0	0	0	4
Finland (Uusipaavalniemi) 🔨	1	0	0	0	3	0	0	1	5

== Post-Round Robin Challenge ==
Following the end of the round robin, the top two teams from each group advanced to the quarterfinals. The last two spots were determined with a Post-Round Robin Challenge, where the third-ranked teams in each group participated. All four team members of each team participated in a Draw Shot Challenge (DSC). The two teams with the closest DSCs, the Czech Republic and Finland, advanced to the quarterfinals.

Nation	Player No.	Draw Shot Challenge^{1}		Qualified
Nation	Player No.	Shot 1	Shot 2	Qualified
Finland	1	185.4^{2}	131.7	Yes
Finland	2	45.5	0	Yes
Finland	3	46.1	76.6	Yes
Finland	4	120.2	117.6	Yes
Finland	Total	723.1		Yes
Netherlands	1	185.4^{2}	185.4^{2}	No
Netherlands	2	185.4^{2}	1.7	No
Netherlands	3	28.8	65.0	No
Netherlands	4	185.4^{2}	16.2	No
Netherlands	Total	853.3		No
Czech Republic	1	6.4	138.7	Yes
Czech Republic	2	65.2	86.6	Yes
Czech Republic	3	36.9	19.2	Yes
Czech Republic	4	127.2	152.8	Yes
Czech Republic	Total	633.0		Yes

^{1} Results measured in centimetres (cm).
^{2} Results marked as "185.4 cm" were outside the house.

== Playoffs ==
Quarterfinals
B2	Denmark	7
G2	Italy	5
B1	Switzerland	7
R2	Scotland	2
R1	Austria	5
B3	Czech Republic	11
G3	Finland	3
G1	Germany	6

Semifinals
B2	Denmark	3
B1	Switzerland	6
B3	Czech Republic	1
G1	Germany	6

Gold Medal Match
B1	Switzerland	9
G1	Germany	3

Bronze Medal Match
B2	Denmark	6
B3	Czech Republic	7

=== Quarterfinals ===
Friday, October 7, 20:30

Sheet 2	1	2	3	4	5	6	7	8	Final
Switzerland (Lips) 🔨	2	0	0	2	1	0	2	X	7
Scotland (Edwards)	0	0	1	0	0	1	0	X	2

Sheet 3	1	2	3	4	5	6	7	8	Final
Austria (Roth)	0	4	0	1	0	0	0	X	5
Czech Republic (Chaloupek) 🔨	3	0	1	0	2	1	4	X	11

Sheet 4	1	2	3	4	5	6	7	8	Final
Denmark (Qvist)	0	2	0	2	0	3	0	X	7
Italy (Bombassei) 🔨	2	0	2	0	1	0	0	X	5

Sheet 1	1	2	3	4	5	6	7	8	Final
Finland (Uusipaavalniemi) 🔨	1	0	0	1	0	1	0	0	3
Germany (Baumann)	0	1	1	0	1	0	2	1	6

=== Semifinals ===
Saturday, October 8, 10:00

Sheet 1	1	2	3	4	5	6	7	8	Final
Denmark (Qvist)	0	0	1	0	1	0	1	X	3
Switzerland (Lips) 🔨	0	1	0	2	0	3	0	X	6

Sheet 4	1	2	3	4	5	6	7	8	Final
Czech Republic (Chaloupek)	0	0	1	0	0	0	X	X	1
Germany (Baumann) 🔨	0	2	0	1	2	1	X	X	6

=== Bronze medal game ===
Saturday, October 8, 15:00

Sheet 2	1	2	3	4	5	6	7	8	9	Final
Denmark (Qvist) 🔨	1	0	1	0	0	0	3	1	0	6
Czech Republic (Chaloupek)	0	2	0	2	0	2	0	0	1	7

=== Gold medal game ===
Saturday, October 8, 15:00

Sheet 3	1	2	3	4	5	6	7	8	Final
Switzerland (Lips)	0	1	2	0	3	0	3	X	9
Germany (Baumann) 🔨	1	0	0	1	0	1	0	X	3

2011 European Mixed Curling Championship
(Switzerland)
Switzerland
1st title
