= 1992 World Junior Curling Championships =

- Host city: Oberstdorf, Germany
- Dates: March 7–15
- Men's winner: Switzerland (2nd title)
- Skip: Stefan Heilman
- Third: Christoph Grossenbacher
- Second: Lucian Jenzer
- Lead: Roger Wyss
- Finalist: France (Jan Henri Ducroz)
- Women's winner: Scotland (2nd title)
- Skip: Gillian Barr
- Third: Claire Milne
- Second: Janice Watt
- Lead: Nikki Mauchline
- Alternate: Karen Addison
- Coach: Peter Loudon
- Finalist: United States (Erika Brown)

The 1992 World Junior Curling Championships were held from March 7 to 15 in Oberstdorf, Germany.

It was the first-ever appearance at the championship for men's and women's national junior teams of Japan.

== Men ==
=== Teams ===
Country	Skip	Third	Second	Lead	Alternate
Canada	Jason Repay	Aaron Skillen	Scott McCallum	Trevor Clifford	
Denmark	Torkil Svensgaard	Ulrik Damm	Kenny Tordrup	Peter Bull	Lasse Damm
France	Jan Henri Ducroz	Spencer Mugnier	Sylvain Ducroz	Thomas Dufour	Philippe Caux
Germany	Markus Herberg	Stephan Knoll	Daniel Herberg	Martin Beiser	Markus Messenzehl
Japan	Takashi Hara	Seiji Asano	Hidetaka Sunaga	Makoto Shirahata	Manabu Aoki
Norway	Thomas Due	Torger Nergård	Mads Rygg	Johan Høstmælingen	Thomas Ulsrud
Scotland	Allan Lyburn	William Lyburn	Colin Beckett	Frazer Hare	Laren Gillespie
Sweden	Joakim Carlsson	Mathias Carlsson	Ola Kindlund	Lars Eriksson	Peter Danielsson
Switzerland	Stefan Heilman	Christoph Grossenbacher	Lucian Jenzer	Roger Wyss	
United States	Eric Fenson	Shawn Rojeski	Kevin Bergstrom	Ted McCann	

=== Round Robin ===
Key
Teams to Playoffs

Place	Country	1	2	3	4	5	6	7	8	9	10	Wins	Losses
1	Sweden	*	8:3	4:6	2:3	7:5	6:4	7:6	11:4	10:2	7:4	7	2
2	Canada	3:8	*	7:4	8:3	9:8	12:5	3:9	8:7	5:4	12:0	7	2
3	Switzerland	6:4	4:7	*	5:4	6:4	6:5	4:5	6:3	7:5	12:3	7	2
4	France	3:2	3:8	4:5	*	7:3	W	8:6	3:8	7:3	10:2	6	3
5	United States	5:7	8:9	4:6	3:7	*	8:1	9:6	10:7	3:7	14:0	4	5
6	Scotland	4:6	5:12	5:6	L	1:8	*	6:5	10:9	7:3	9:2	4	5
7	Germany	6:7	9:3	5:4	6:8	6:9	5:6	*	7:5	3:5	8:3	4	5
8	Norway	4:11	7:8	3:6	8:3	7:10	9:10	5:7	*	6:5	11:2	3	6
9	Denmark	2:10	4:5	5:7	3:7	7:3	3:7	5:3	5:6	*	15:0	3	6
10	Japan	4:7	0:12	3:12	2:10	0:14	2:9	3:8	2:11	0:15	*	0	9

(«W» — technical win; «L» — technical loss)

=== Playoffs ===
Semifinals
1	Sweden	4
4	France	6
2	Canada	4
3	Switzerland	6

Gold Medal Game
4	France	8
3	Switzerland	10

=== Rankings ===
Place	Country	Games	Wins	Losses
1st place, gold medalist(s)	Switzerland	11	9	2
2nd place, silver medalist(s)	France	11	7	4
3rd place, bronze medalist(s)	Canada	10	7	3
3rd place, bronze medalist(s)	Sweden	10	7	3
5	United States	9	4	5
6	Scotland	9	4	5
7	Germany	9	4	5
8	Norway	9	3	6
9	Denmark	9	3	6
10	Japan	9	0	9

== Women ==
=== Teams ===
Country	Skip	Third	Second	Lead	Alternate	Coach
Canada	Heather Smith	Denise Cormier	Suzanne LeBlanc	Lesley Hicks		
Denmark	Dorthe Holm	Margit Pörtner	Angelina Jensen	Helene Jensen	Nel-Britt Kristensen	
France	Tiphaine Schmitt	Severine Bibollet	Aurore Vuillemin	Nadia Bénier		Thierry Mercier
Germany	Monica Imminger	Manon Stockhammar	Alexandra Theurer	Nina Schmid	Gesa Müller	
Japan	Mayumi Ohmura	Mika Yoda	Kanna Yamada	Takako Morlizumi	Yuka Kobayashi	
Norway	Marianne Haslum	Kristin Løvseth	Hege Korstadshagen	Elisabeth Sandberg		Thoralf Hognestad
Scotland	Gillian Barr	Claire Milne	Janice Watt	Nikki Mauchline	Karen Addison	Peter Loudon
Sweden	Eva Eriksson	Maria Söderkvist	Åsa Eriksson	Elisabeth de Brito	Maria Hjorth	
Switzerland	Helga Oswald	Sara Ochsner	Janine Oswald	Tatjana Stadler		
United States	Erika Brown	Kari Liapis	Stacey Liapis	Roberta Breyen	Debbie Henry	

=== Round Robin ===
Key
Teams to Playoffs
Teams to Tibreaker for 8th place

Place	Country	1	2	3	4	5	6	7	8	9	10	Wins	Losses
1	Scotland	*	11:5	11:3	7:8	9:6	11:1	7:4	8:4	10:4	12:0	8	1
2	Sweden	5:11	*	8:4	6:3	9:2	4:7	8:3	9:5	8:0	14:1	7	2
3	United States	3:11	4:8	*	9:8	6:4	10:6	9:4	7:2	12:6	12:4	7	2
4	Switzerland	8:7	3:6	8:9	*	7:6	7:3	9:1	6:4	7:4	12:1	7	2
5	Canada	6:9	2:9	4:6	6:7	*	11:7	9:2	6:1	10:3	8:5	5	4
6	Norway	1:11	7:4	6:10	3:7	7:11	*	6:9	7:5	6:2	19:0	4	5
7	France	4:7	3:8	4:9	1:9	2:9	9:6	*	6:4	3:11	9:6	3	6
8	Denmark	4:8	5:9	2:7	4:6	1:6	5:7	4:6	*	8:5	13:0	2	7
8	Germany	4:10	0:8	6:12	4:7	3:10	2:6	11:3	5:8	*	7:1	2	7
10	Japan	0:12	1:14	4:12	1:12	5:8	0:19	6:9	0:13	1:7	*	0	9

==== Tiebreaker ====
.
Denmark	8
Germany	5

=== Playoffs ===
Semifinals
1	Scotland	7
4	Switzerland	4
2	Sweden	5
3	United States	6

Gold Medal Game
1	Scotland	10
3	United States	2

=== Rankings ===
Place	Country	Games	Wins	Losses
1st place, gold medalist(s)	Scotland	11	10	1
2nd place, silver medalist(s)	United States	11	8	3
3rd place, bronze medalist(s)	Switzerland	10	7	3
3rd place, bronze medalist(s)	Sweden	10	7	3
5	Canada	9	5	4
6	Norway	9	4	5
7	France	9	3	6
8	Denmark	10	3	7
9	Germany	10	2	8
10	Japan	9	0	9

== Awards ==
WJCC All-Star Team:

	Skip	Third	Second	Lead
Men	(Canada) Jason Repay	(United States) Shawn Rojeski	(Switzerland) Roger Wyss	(Germany) Martin Beiser
Women	(Sweden) Eva Eriksson	(United States) Kari Liapis	(Scotland) Janice Rankin	(Canada) Lesley Hicks

WJCC Sportsmanship Award:

Men	(Japan) Takashi Hara
Women	(Japan) Mayumi Ohmura

== Sources ==
- Men's results from the World Curling Federation
- Women's results from the World Curling Federation
