= Jörg Engesser =

German curler (born 1981)

- Curler ♂
- Born: 25 May 1981 (age 45)

Team
- Curling club: CC Schwenningen, Schwenningen

Curling career
- Member Association: Germany
- World Championship: 1 (2003)
- European Championship: 1 (2014)
- Other appearances: World Junior Championships: 1 (1999)
Medal record
Curling
German Men's Championship
Gold medal – first place	2003
Gold medal – first place	2015 Hugelsheim
Silver medal – second place	2001
Bronze medal – third place	2004
Bronze medal – third place	2013 Oberstdorf
Bronze medal – third place	2014 Hamburg

Jörg Engesser (born 25 May 1981) is a German curler.

At the national level, he is a two-time German men's champion curler (2003, 2015).

== Teams ==
Season	Skip	Third	Second	Lead	Alternate	Coach	Events
1998–99	Andreas Lang	Rainer Beiter	Sebastian Schweizer	Stefan Klaiber	Jörg Engesser		WJCC 1999 (6th)
2000–01	Andreas Lang	Richard Cook	Rainer Beiter	Sebastian Schweizer	Jörg Engesser		GMCC 2001 (silver)
2002–03	Andreas Lang	Rainer Beiter	Jürgen Beck	Sebastian Schweizer	Jörg Engesser	Dick Henderson (WCC)	GMCC 2003 (gold); WCC 2003 (9th)
2003–04	Andreas Lang	Rainer Beiter	Sebastian Schweizer	Jörg Engesser			GMCC 2004 (bronze)
2011–12	Alexander Baumann	Manuel Walter	Sebastian Schweizer	Jörg Engesser			
2012–13	Alexander Baumann	Manuel Walter	Sebastian Schweizer	Jörg Engesser			GMCC 2013 (bronze)
2013–14	Alexander Baumann	Manuel Walter	Sebastian Schweizer	Jörg Engesser	Marc Bastian		GMCC 2014 (bronze)
2014–15	Alexander Baumann	Manuel Walter	Marc Muskatewitz	Sebastian Schweizer	Jörg Engesser	Martin Beiser	ECC 2014 (8th)
2014–15	Alexander Baumann	Manuel Walter	Sebastian Schweizer	Marc Bastian	Jörg Engesser		GMCC 2015 (gold)
