= Bernhard Mayr =

German curler

- Curler ♂

Team
- Curling club: Münchener EV

Curling career
- Member Association: Germany
- World Championship: 3 (1992, 1993, 2006)
- European Championship: 1 (2006)
- Other appearances: World Junior Championships: 1 (1988)
Medal record
Curling
German Men's Championship
Gold medal – first place	1992
Gold medal – first place	1993

Bernhard Mayr is a German curler.

At the national level, he is a two-time German men's champion curler (1992, 1993).

Since 2015 he works as a President of German Curling Association.

== Teams ==
Season	Skip	Third	Second	Lead	Alternate	Coach	Events
1987–88	Bernhard Mayr	Mark Sarty	Ralph Schwarzwalder	Andreas Feldenkirchen			WJCC 1988 (8th)
1991–92	Rodger Gustaf Schmidt	Wolfgang Burba	Hans-Joachim Burba	Bernhard Mayr	Martin Beiser		GMCC 1992 (gold); WCC 1992 (9th)
1992–93	Wolfgang Burba	Bernhard Mayr	Markus Herberg	Daniel Herberg			GMCC 1993 (gold)
1992–93	Wolfgang Burba	Bernhard Mayr	Markus Herberg	Martin Beiser	Daniel Herberg		WCC 1993 (9th)
2005–06	Sebastian Stock	Daniel Herberg	Markus Messenzehl	Patrick Hoffman	Bernhard Mayr	Dick Henderson	WCC 2006 (10th)
2006–07	Sebastian Stock	Daniel Herberg	Markus Messenzehl	Patrick Hoffman	Bernhard Mayr		ECC 2006 (4th)
2007–08	Sebastian Stock	Daniel Herberg	Markus Messenzehl	Patrick Hoffman	Bernhard Mayr		
2011–12	Andy Kapp	Wolfgang Burba	Bernhard Mayr	Markus Herberg	Philip Seitz		
2013–14	Daniel Herberg	Bernhard Mayr	Markus Messenzehl	Stefan Wiedmann			
