= Rainer Beiter =

German curler (born 1978)

- Curler ♂
- Born: 18 July 1978 (age 48)

Team
- Curling club: CC Schwenningen, Schwenningen

Curling career
- Member Association: Germany
- World Championship: 1 (2003)
- Other appearances: World Junior Championships: 1 (1999)
Medal record
Curling
German Men's Championship
Gold medal – first place	2003
Silver medal – second place	2001
Bronze medal – third place	2004

Rainer Beiter (born 18 July 1978) is a German curler.

At the national level, he is a German men's champion curler (2003; silver in 2001; bronze in 2004).

== Teams ==
Season	Skip	Third	Second	Lead	Alternate	Coach	Events
1998–99	Andreas Lang	Rainer Beiter	Sebastian Schweizer	Stefan Klaiber	Jörg Engesser		WJCC 1999 (6th)
2000–01	Andreas Lang	Richard Cook	Rainer Beiter	Sebastian Schweizer	Jörg Engesser		GMCC 2001 (silver)
2002–03	Andreas Lang	Rainer Beiter	Jürgen Beck	Sebastian Schweizer	Jörg Engesser	Dick Henderson (WCC)	GMCC 2003 (gold); WCC 2003 (9th)
2003–04	Andreas Lang	Rainer Beiter	Sebastian Schweizer	Jörg Engesser			GMCC 2004 (bronze)
