= Daniel Neuner =

German curler (born 1987)

- Curler
- Born: 25 October 1987 (age 39); Garmisch-Partenkirchen, Bavaria, West Germany

Team
- Curling club: SC Riessersee, Garmisch-Partenkirchen

Curling career
- World Championship: 1 (2019)
- European Championship: 2 (2012, 2018)
- Other appearances: World Junior Curling Championships: 2 (2007, 2008), European Junior Curling Challenge: 1 (2007), European Youth Olympic Winter Festival: 1 (2005)
Medal record
Curling
Representing Germany

Daniel Neuner (born 25 October 1987 in Garmisch-Partenkirchen, West Germany) is a German male curler. He has represented Germany at several international championships, including at two World Junior Championships and a World Men's Championship.

== Curling career ==
As a junior Neuner skipped Team Germany in back-to-back years at the World Junior Championships, in 2007 and 2008. His teams finished 8th and 6th, respectively.

Neuner competed in his first European Men's Curling Championship in 2012 as lead for skip Andreas Lang. The team also included third Daniel Herberg (a two-time Olympian), second Markus Messenzehl, and Andreas Kempf as alternate. The tournament went poorly for Team Germany, their only win came over Hungary's György Nagy. Their 1-8 record put them at 9th out of the 10 teams in the Group A competition and meant Germany was relegated to Group B of the 2013 European Curling Championships.

Later in the season the same team competed in the 2013 German Men's Curling Championship, though without Lang at skip. With Lang out, the rest of the team was promoted a position, with Herberg skipping, Messenzehl as third, Neuner as second, and former alternate Kempf as lead. The team finished with a 4-2 record, good enough for the silver medal behind John Jahr. The next year Neuner returned to the German Championship with a different team, throwing third for skip Konstantin Kampf. Despite the different team, the result was the same for Neuner, another silver medal to John Jahr's gold.

For the 2018 European Championships Neuner played as second for skip Marc Muskatewitz. The team just missed getting a medal, losing the bronze medal match to Italy's Joël Retornaz 6-8. Later in the same season Neuner played with Muskatewitz again, this time as third at the 2019 World Men's Championship. It was Neuner's first World Men's Championship and they finished in 8th place, Germany's best finish since 2014.

== Personal life ==
Neuner started curling around the age of 15. He attended LMU Munich.

== Teams ==
Season	Skip	Third	Second	Lead	Alternate	Coach	Events
2004–05	Nico Erlewein	Daniel Neuner	Florian Zahler	Sven Rauscher	Konstantin Harsch	Holger Schäfer	EYOWF 2005 (bronze)
2006–07	Daniel Neuner	Florian Zahler	Johannes Glaser	Dominik Greindl	Gabor Dénes (WJCC)	Rainer Schöpp	EJCC 2007 (gold); WJCC 2007 (8th)
2007–08	Daniel Neuner	Florian Zahler	Johannes Glaser	Dominik Greindl	George Geiger	Rainer Schöpp	WJCC 2008 (6th)
2008–09	Daniel Neuner	Florian Zahler	Dominik Greindl	Laynes Lauterbach	George Geiger		
2009–10	Daniel Neuner	Florian Zahler	Dominik Greindl	Laynes Lauterbach	George Geiger		
2010–11	Daniel Neuner	Florian Zahler	Dominik Greindl	Laynes Lauterbach			
2011–12	Andreas Lang	Daniel Herberg	Markus Messenzehl	Daniel Neuner	Andreas Kempf		
2012–13	Andreas Lang	Daniel Herberg	Markus Messenzehl	Daniel Neuner	Andreas Kempf	Andy Kapp, Martin Beiser	ECC 2012 (9th)
2012–13	Daniel Herberg	Markus Messenzehl	Daniel Neuner	Andreas Kempf			GMCC 2013 (silver)
2013–14	Konstantin Kampf	Daniel Neuner	Alexander Kampf	Dominik Greindl	Sebastian Jacoby		GMCC 2014 (silver)
2014–15	Daniel Neuner (fourth)	Konstantin Kampf (skip)	Alexander Kampf	Dominik Greindl	Sebastian Jacoby		
2018–19	Marc Muskatewitz	Sixten Totzek	Daniel Neuner	Ryan Sherrard	Sebastian Schweizer	Martin Beiser	ECC 2018 (4th)
2018–19	Marc Muskatewitz	Daniel Neuner	Ryan Sherrard	Dominik Greindl	Benjamin Kapp	Andy Kapp	WCC 2019 (8th)
