= German Masters (curling) =

Annual curling tournament

The German Masters is an annual bonspiel, or curling tournament, that takes place at the Curling Club Hamburg in Hamburg, Germany. The tournament is a round-robin format. The tournament was started in 2012 as part of the World Curling Tour.

== Past champions ==
Only skip's name is displayed.

Year	Winning team	Runner up team	Purse (EUR)
2012	(United States) Tyler George	(Germany) Wolfgang Burba	15,000
2013	(Scotland) David Murdoch	(Denmark) Rasmus Stjerne	15,000
2014	(Switzerland) Sven Michel	(Switzerland) Peter de Cruz	15,000
2015	(Canada) Brendan Bottcher	(Switzerland) Sven Michel	15,000
2016	(Scotland) David Murdoch	(South Korea) Kim Soo-hyuk	15,000
2017	(Norway) Steffen Walstad	(Scotland) Kyle Smith	17,500
2018	(Switzerland) Marc Pfister	(Scotland) Kyle Smith	17,500
