= 1991 World Junior Curling Championships =

- Host city: Glasgow, Scotland
- Dates: March 9–17
- Men's winner: Scotland (5th title)
- Skip: Alan MacDougall
- Third: James Dryburgh
- Second: Fraser MacGregor
- Lead: Colin Beckett
- Finalist: Canada (Noel Herron)
- Women's winner: Sweden (1st title)
- Skip: Eva Eriksson
- Third: Maria Söderkvist
- Second: Åsa Eriksson
- Lead: Elisabeth de Brito
- Alternate: Cathrine Norberg
- Finalist: Switzerland (Nicole Strausak)

The 1991 World Junior Curling Championships were held from March 9 to 17 in Glasgow, Scotland.

== Men ==
=== Teams ===
Country	Skip	Third	Second	Lead	Alternate
Canada	Noel Herron	Rob Brewer	Steve Small	Richard Polk	Peter Henderson
Denmark	Torkil Svensgaard	Ulrik Damm	Kenny Tordrup	Lasse Damm	Peter Bull
France	Jan Henri Ducroz	Spencer Mugnier	Sylvain Ducroz	Thomas Dufour	Philippe Caux
Germany	Markus Herberg	Marcus Räderer	Felix Ogger	Martin Beiser	Markus Messenzehl
Italy	Marco Alberti	Alessandro Lettieri	Rolando Cavallo	Gianni Nardon	Stefano Gottardi
Norway	Thomas Due	Torger Nergård	Mads Rygg	Johan Høstmælingen	Krister Aanesen
Scotland	Alan MacDougall	James Dryburgh	Fraser MacGregor	Colin Beckett	
Sweden	Tomas Nordin	Örjan Jonsson	Stefan Timan	Jan Wallin	Peja Lindholm
Switzerland	Dominic Andres	Mike Schüpbach	Marc Steiner	Mathias Hügli	Stefan Heilman
United States	Eric Fenson	Shawn Rojeski	Kevin Bergstrom	Ted McCann	Mike Peplinski

=== Round Robin ===
Key
Teams to Playoffs
Teams to Tiebreaker

Place	Country	1	2	3	4	5	6	7	8	9	10	Wins	Losses
1	Scotland	*	8:5	8:5	14:2	6:3	10:5	8:3	7:3	9:1	10:1	9	0
2	Canada	5:8	*	9:3	8:3	12:1	7:2	9:2	11:3	11:2	8:1	8	1
3	Switzerland	5:8	3:9	*	5:2	7:1	8:3	7:0	6:7	5:4	6:3	6	3
4	United States	2:14	3:8	2:5	*	8:2	3:4	11:6	9:4	9:4	8:6	5	4
4	Denmark	3:6	1:12	1:7	2:8	*	8:4	3:2	5:4	8:3	11:6	5	4
6	Germany	5:10	2:7	3:8	4:3	4:8	*	4:6	10:6	7:4	10:2	4	5
7	Sweden	3:8	2:9	0:7	6:11	2:3	6:4	*	6:5	4:13	6:4	3	6
8	Norway	3:7	3:11	7:6	4:9	4:5	6:10	5:6	*	5:4	6:4	3	6
9	France	1:9	2:11	4:5	4:9	3:8	4:7	13:4	4:5	*	8:3	2	7
10	Italy	1:10	1:8	3:6	6:8	6:11	2:10	4:6	4:6	3:8	*	0	9

==== Tiebreaker ====
.
United States	8
Denmark	5

=== Playoffs ===
Semifinals
1	Scotland	7
4	United States	5
2	Canada	6
3	Switzerland	4

Gold Medal Game
1	Scotland	5
2	Canada	4

=== Rankings ===
Place	Country	Games	Wins	Losses
1st place, gold medalist(s)	Scotland	11	11	0
2nd place, silver medalist(s)	Canada	11	9	2
3rd place, bronze medalist(s)	Switzerland	10	6	4
3rd place, bronze medalist(s)	United States	11	6	5
5	Denmark	10	5	5
6	Germany	9	4	5
7	Sweden	9	3	6
8	Norway	9	3	6
9	France	9	2	7
10	Italy	9	0	9

== Women ==
=== Teams ===
Country	Skip	Third	Second	Lead	Alternate	Coach
Canada	Atina Ford	Darlene Kidd	Lesley Beck	Cindy Ford	Danita Michalski	
Denmark	Dorthe Holm (4th)	June Simonsen (skip)	Margit Pörtner	Helene Jensen	Angelina Jensen	
France	Karine Caux	Chrystelle Fournier	Géraldine Girod	Tania Ducroz	Helene Ducroz	
Germany	Katrin Mayer	Julia Eckert	Steffi Gabler	Anja Messenzehl	Monica Imminger	
Italy	Daniela Zandegiacomo	Carla Zandegiacomo	Giulia Lacedelli	Violetta Caldart		
Norway	Cecilie Torhaug	Darcie Skjerpen	Anna Moe	Marianne Vestnes	Gøril Bye	
Scotland	Gillian Barr	Claire Milne	Janice Watt	Anne Laird		Peter Loudon
Sweden	Eva Eriksson	Maria Söderkvist	Åsa Eriksson	Elisabeth de Brito	Cathrine Norberg	
Switzerland	Nicole Strausak	Ursula Ziegler	Katja Matties	Claudia Affolter	Helga Oswald	
United States	Erika Brown	Jill Jones	Shellie Holerud	Debbie Henry		

=== Round Robin ===
Key
Teams to Playoffs

Place	Country	1	2	3	4	5	6	7	8	9	10	Wins	Losses
1	Canada	*	6:4	11:7	5:4	9:4	8:2	10:0	5:4	12:8	13:2	9	0
2	Scotland	4:6	*	5:7	9:3	6:4	11:3	5:4	8:0	6:4	9:4	7	2
3	Switzerland	7:11	7:5	*	9:7	5:6	7:9	11:3	7:3	11:1	10:1	6	3
4	Sweden	4:5	3:9	7:9	*	9:4	8:5	8:3	6:5	9:3	10:2	6	3
5	United States	4:9	4:6	6:5	4:9	*	9:8	8:4	4:7	4:1	11:4	5	4
6	Denmark	2:8	3:11	9:7	5:8	8:9	*	6:0	9:3	6:4	12:2	5	4
7	France	0:10	4:5	3:11	3:8	4:8	0:6	*	9:0	9:7	11:2	3	6
8	Norway	4:5	0:8	3:7	5:6	7:4	3:9	0:9	*	7:4	12:4	3	6
9	Italy	8:12	4:6	1:11	3:9	1:4	4:6	7:9	4:7	*	14:11	1	8
10	Germany	2:13	4:9	1:10	2:10	4:11	2:12	2:11	4:12	11:14	*	0	9

=== Playoffs ===
Semifinals
1	Canada	5
4	Sweden	7
2	Scotland	5
3	Switzerland	6

Gold Medal Game
1	Sweden	5
3	Switzerland	4

=== Rankings ===
Place	Country	Games	Wins	Losses
1st place, gold medalist(s)	Sweden	11	8	3
2nd place, silver medalist(s)	Switzerland	11	7	4
3rd place, bronze medalist(s)	Canada	10	9	1
3rd place, bronze medalist(s)	Scotland	10	7	3
5	United States	9	5	4
6	Denmark	9	5	4
7	France	9	3	6
8	Norway	9	3	6
9	Italy	9	1	8
10	Germany	9	0	9

== Awards ==
WJCC All-Star Team:

	Skip	Third	Second	Lead
Men	(Scotland) Alan MacDougall	(United States) Shawn Rojeski	(Sweden) Peja Lindholm	(Canada) Richard Polk
Women	(Denmark) Dorthe Holm	(Switzerland) Ursula Ziegler	(Canada) Lesley Beck	(Switzerland) Claudia Affolter

WJCC Sportsmanship Award:

Men	(Italy) Marco Alberti
Women	(Denmark) Dorthe Holm

== Sources ==
- Men's results from the World Curling Federation
- Women's results from the World Curling Federation
