= Wolfgang Burba =

German curler and coach (born 1960)

- Curler ♂
- Born: 31 July 1960 (age 66); Oberstdorf

Team
- Curling club: EC Oberstdorf

Curling career
- Member Association: Germany
- World Championship: 3 (1987, 1992, 1993)
- European Championship: 1 (1985)
- Other appearances: World Senior Championships: 2 (2015, 2018)
Medal record
Curling
Representing Germany
World Championships
Silver medal – second place	1987 Vancouver
European Championships
Gold medal – first place	1985 Grindelwald
German Men's Championship
Gold medal – first place	1992
Gold medal – first place	1993
Silver medal – second place	1995
Silver medal – second place	2016
Bronze medal – third place	2015

Wolfgang Burba (born 31 July 1960 in Oberstdorf) is a former German curler and curling coach.

He is a former World men's runner-up (1987), European men's curling champion (1985) and two-time German men's curling champion (1992, 1993; silver in 1995, 2016; bronze in 2015).

His brother Hans-Joachim Burba is a curler too and Wolfgang's longtime teammate.

== Personal life ==
Burba is married and has one child.

== Teams ==
Season	Skip	Third	Second	Lead	Alternate	Coach	Events
1978–79	Roland Jentsch	Hans-Joachim Burba	Wolfgang Burba	Werner Kolb			WJCC 1979 (10th)
1985–86	Rodger Gustaf Schmidt	Wolfgang Burba	Johnny Jahr	Hans-Joachim Burba			ECC 1985 (gold); WCC CR 1985 (gold)
1986–87	Rodger Gustaf Schmidt	Wolfgang Burba	Johnny Jahr	Hans-Joachim Burba			WCC 1987 (silver)
1991–92	Rodger Gustaf Schmidt	Wolfgang Burba	Hans-Joachim Burba	Bernhard Mayr	Martin Beiser		GMCC 1992 (gold); WCC 1992 (9th)
1992–93	Wolfgang Burba	Bernhard Mayr	Markus Herberg	Daniel Herberg			GMCC 1993 (gold)
1992–93	Wolfgang Burba	Bernhard Mayr	Markus Herberg	Martin Beiser	Daniel Herberg		WCC 1993 (9th)
1994–95	Wolfgang Burba	?	?	?			GMCC 1995 (silver)
2011–12	Andy Kapp	Wolfgang Burba	Bernhard Mayr	Markus Herberg	Philip Seitz		
2014–15	Wolfgang Burba	Hans-Joachim Burba	Mike Burba	Cristoph Schmidt			GMCC 2015 (bronze)
2014–15	Wolfgang Burba	Hans-Joachim Burba	Christoph Möckel	Matthias Steiner		Anna Terekhova	WSCC 2015 (13th)
2015–16	Wolfgang Burba	Matthias Zobel	Eric Richert	Mike Burba			GMCC 2016 (silver)
2017–18	Johnny Jahr	Wolfgang Burba	Joachim Burba	Christoph Möckel	Matthias Steiner	Alexander Forsyth	WSCC 2018 (9th)

== Record as a coach of national teams ==
Year	Tournament, event	National team	Place
2013	2013 European Junior Curling Challenge	Italy (junior men)	1st place, gold medalist(s)
2013	2013 World Junior Curling Championships	Italy (junior men)	6
2015	2015 European Curling Championships	Italy (women)	11
2017	2017 World Junior B Curling Championships	Germany (junior men)	4
2018	2018 World Junior B Curling Championships	Germany (junior men)	3rd place, bronze medalist(s)
2018	2018 World Junior Curling Championships	Germany (junior men)	5
2019	2019 World Junior Curling Championships	Germany (junior men)	7
2019	2019 World Junior-B Curling Championships	Germany (junior men)	3rd place, bronze medalist(s)
2020	2020 World Junior Curling Championships	Germany (junior men)	4
2025	2025 Winter World University Games	Italy (men)	6
2025	2025 World Junior Curling Championships	Italy (junior men)	1st place, gold medalist(s)
