= Stephan Knoll (curler) =

German curler (born 1973)

- Curler ♂
- Born: 16 March 1973 (age 53); Oberstdorf, Germany

Team
- Curling club: EC Oberstdorf

Curling career
- Member Association: Germany
- World Championship: 1 (2004)
- European Championship: 7 (1996, 1998, 1999, 2001, 2002, 2003, 2004)
- Olympic: 1 (2002)
Medal record
Curling
Representing Germany
World Championships
Silver medal – second place	2004 Gävle
European Championships
Gold medal – first place	2002 Grindelwald
Gold medal – first place	2004 Sofia
World Junior Championships
Silver medal – second place	1994 Sofia
Bronze medal – third place	1993 Grindelwald

Stephan Knoll (born 16 March 1973 in Oberstdorf) is a German curler. He is World men's silver medallist and two time European men's champion. He competed at the 2002 Salt Lake City Olympics on the German team that placed sixth with a 4-5 record. He played for Team Europe at 2004 Continental Cup of Curling.

== Teams ==
Season	Skip	Third	Second	Lead	Alternate	Coach	Events
1991–92	Markus Herberg	Stephan Knoll	Daniel Herberg	Martin Beiser	Markus Messenzehl		WJCC 1992 (7th)
1992–93	Markus Herberg	Daniel Herberg	Stephan Knoll	Markus Messenzehl	Oliver Trevisiol		WJCC 1993 (bronze)
1993–94	Daniel Herberg	Stephan Knoll	Oliver Trevisiol	Markus Rohrmoser	Hans-Peter Kiess		WJCC 1994 (silver)
1996–97	Daniel Herberg	Björn Schröder	Stephan Knoll	Patrick Hoffman	Markus Messenzehl	Keith Wendorf	ECC 1996 (4th)
1998–99	Daniel Herberg	Sebastian Stock	Stephan Knoll	Patrick Hoffman	Markus Messenzehl	Keith Wendorf	ECC 1998 (6th)
1999–00	Daniel Herberg	Sebastian Stock	Stephan Knoll	Patrick Hoffman	Markus Messenzehl	Keith Wendorf	ECC 1999 (9th)
2001–02	Sebastian Stock	Daniel Herberg	Stephan Knoll	Markus Messenzehl	Patrick Hoffman	Keith Wendorf (ECC)	ECC 2001 (8th); OG 2002 (6th)
2002–03	Sebastian Stock	Daniel Herberg	Stephan Knoll	Markus Messenzehl	Patrick Hoffman	Uli Sutor	ECC 2002 (gold)
2003–04	Sebastian Stock	Daniel Herberg	Markus Messenzehl	Patrick Hoffman	Stephan Knoll	Uli Sutor	ECC 2003 (6th)
2003–04	Sebastian Stock	Daniel Herberg	Stephan Knoll	Markus Messenzehl	Patrick Hoffman	Uli Sutor	WCC 2004 (silver)
2004–05	Sebastian Stock	Daniel Herberg	Stephan Knoll	Markus Messenzehl	Patrick Hoffman	Markus Herberg	ECC 2004 (gold)
2005–06	Sebastian Stock	Daniel Herberg	Stephan Knoll	Markus Messenzehl	Patrick Hoffman		
