= Markus Messenzehl =

German curler (born 1972)

- Curler ♂
- Born: 20 June 1972 (age 54); Oberstdorf, Germany

Team
- Curling club: EC Oberstdorf

Curling career
- Member Association: Germany
- World Championship: 3 (2004, 2006, 2011)
- European Championship: 7 (1996, 1998, 1999, 2001, 2002, 2003, 2004, 2006, 2010, 2012)
- Olympic: 1 (2002)
- Other appearances: World Senior Curling Championships: 2 (2024, 2025)
Medal record
Curling
Representing Germany
World Championships
Silver medal – second place	2004 Gävle
European Championships
Gold medal – first place	2002 Grindelwald
Gold medal – first place	2004 Sofia
World Junior Championships
Bronze medal – third place	1993 Grindelwald

Markus Messenzehl (born 20 June 1972 in Oberstdorf) is a German curler. He is World men's silver medallist and two time European men's champion. He competed at the 2002 Salt Lake City Olympics on the German team that placed sixth with a 4-5 record.

His son, Felix is also a curler.

== Teams ==
Season	Skip	Third	Second	Lead	Alternate	Coach	Events
1990–91	Markus Herberg	Marcus Räderer	Felix Ogger	Martin Beiser	Markus Messenzehl		WJCC 1991 (6th)
1991–92	Markus Herberg	Stephan Knoll	Daniel Herberg	Martin Beiser	Markus Messenzehl		WJCC 1992 (7th)
1992–93	Markus Herberg	Daniel Herberg	Stephan Knoll	Markus Messenzehl	Oliver Trevisiol		WJCC 1993 (bronze)
1996–97	Daniel Herberg	Björn Schröder	Stephan Knoll	Patrick Hoffman	Markus Messenzehl	Keith Wendorf	ECC 1996 (4th)
1998–99	Daniel Herberg	Sebastian Stock	Stephan Knoll	Patrick Hoffman	Markus Messenzehl	Keith Wendorf	ECC 1998 (6th)
1999–00	Daniel Herberg	Sebastian Stock	Stephan Knoll	Patrick Hoffman	Markus Messenzehl	Keith Wendorf	ECC 1999 (9th)
2001–02	Sebastian Stock	Daniel Herberg	Stephan Knoll	Markus Messenzehl	Patrick Hoffman	Keith Wendorf (ECC)	ECC 2001 (8th); OG 2002 (6th)
2002–03	Sebastian Stock	Daniel Herberg	Stephan Knoll	Markus Messenzehl	Patrick Hoffman	Uli Sutor	ECC 2002 (gold)
2003–04	Sebastian Stock	Daniel Herberg	Markus Messenzehl	Patrick Hoffman	Stephan Knoll	Uli Sutor	ECC 2003 (6th)
2003–04	Sebastian Stock	Daniel Herberg	Stephan Knoll	Markus Messenzehl	Patrick Hoffman	Uli Sutor	WCC 2004 (silver)
2004–05	Sebastian Stock	Daniel Herberg	Stephan Knoll	Markus Messenzehl	Patrick Hoffman	Markus Herberg	ECC 2004 (gold)
2005–06	Sebastian Stock	Daniel Herberg	Stephan Knoll	Markus Messenzehl	Patrick Hoffman		
2005–06	Sebastian Stock	Daniel Herberg	Markus Messenzehl	Patrick Hoffman	Bernhard Mayr	Dick Henderson	WCC 2006 (10th)
2006–07	Sebastian Stock	Daniel Herberg	Markus Messenzehl	Patrick Hoffman	Bernhard Mayr		ECC 2006 (4th)
2007–08	Sebastian Stock	Daniel Herberg	Markus Messenzehl	Patrick Hoffman	Bernhard Mayr		
2008–09	Sebastian Stock	Daniel Herberg	Markus Messenzehl	Patrick Hoffman			
2010–11	Andy Kapp	Daniel Herberg	Holger Höhne	Markus Messenzehl	Andreas Kempf	Martin Beiser	ECC 2010 (4th)
2010–11	Andy Kapp	Andreas Lang	Daniel Herberg	Markus Messenzehl	Holger Höhne	Martin Beiser	WCC 2011 (6th)
2011–12	Andreas Lang	Daniel Herberg	Markus Messenzehl	Daniel Neuner	Andreas Kempf		
2012–13	Andreas Lang	Daniel Herberg	Markus Messenzehl	Daniel Neuner	Andreas Kempf	Andy Kapp, Martin Beiser	ECC 2012 (9th)
2013–14	Daniel Herberg	Bernhard Mayr	Markus Messenzehl	Stefan Wiedmann			
2014–15	Andy Kapp	Daniel Herberg	Markus Messenzehl	Holger Höhne			
