= 1999 World Junior Curling Championships =

- Host city: Östersund, Sweden
- Arena: Z-Hallen
- Dates: March 20–28, 1999
- Men's winner: Canada
- Curling club: Ottawa CC, Ottawa
- Skip: John Morris
- Third: Craig Savill
- Second: Jason Young
- Lead: Brent Laing
- Alternate: Andy Ormsby
- Coach: Scott Taylor
- Finalist: Switzerland (Christian Haller)
- Women's winner: Switzerland
- Curling club: JCC Wallisellen, Wallisellen
- Skip: Silvana Tirinzoni
- Third: Michèle Knobel
- Second: Brigitte Schori
- Lead: Martina von Arx
- Alternate: Carmen Schäfer
- Coach: Heinz Schmid
- Finalist: Japan (Akiko Katoh)

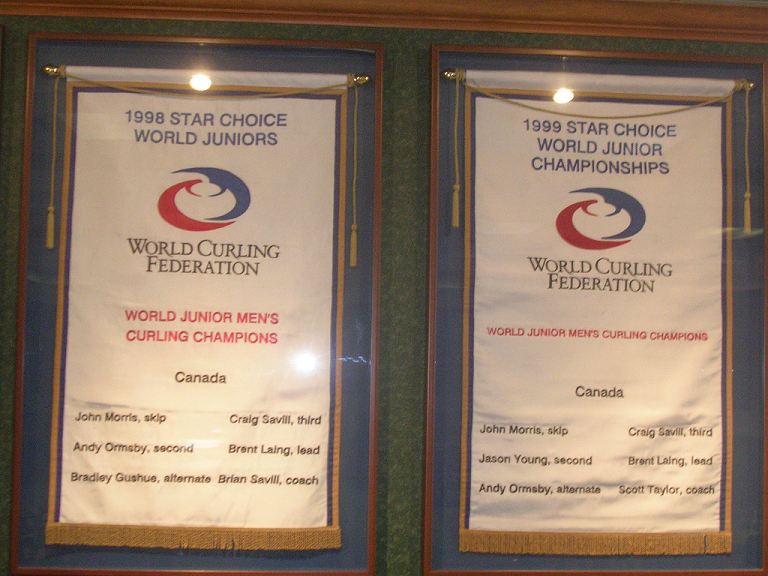
1999 World Junior Men's Championship banner (right) awarded to Team Canada.

The 1999 STAR CHOICE World Junior Curling Championships were held at Z-Hallen in Östersund, Sweden March 20–28.

== Men's ==
=== Teams ===
Country	Skip	Third	Second	Lead	Alternate
Canada	John Morris	Craig Savill	Jason Young	Brent Laing	Andy Ormsby
Czech Republic	Vit Nekovarik	Petr Šulc	Jindřich Kitzberger	Marek David	Karel Uher
England	Daniel Jaeggi	Andrew Reed	Thomas Jaeggi	Christopher Smith	Duncan Edwards
Germany	Andreas Lang	Rainer Beiter	Sebastian Schweizer	Stefan Klaiber	Jörg Engesser
Japan	Hiroaki Kashiwagi	Jun Nakayama	Kazuto Yanagizawa	Keita Yanagizawa	Takanori Ichimura
Norway	Thomas Berntsen	Thomas Løvold	Jan Øivind Hewitt	Petter Moe	Christoffer Svae
Scotland	David Murdoch	Duncan Fernie	Andrew Reid	Richard Woods	Jamie Kirk
Sweden	Patric Håkansson	David Kallin	Thomas Wallentinsson	Rickard Högström	Jonas Johansson
Switzerland	Christian Haller	Urs Eichhorn	Pascal Albertin	René Kunz	Patrick Vuille
United States	Andy Roza	Steve Jaixen	Kevin Jordan	Crhis Becher	Scott Jordan

=== Round-robin standings ===
Country	Skip	Wins	Losses
Canada	John Morris	8	1
Switzerland	Christian Haller	7	2
United States	Andy Roza	7	2
Sweden	Patric Håkansson	7	2
Scotland	David Murdoch	6	3
Germany	Andreas Lang	3	6
Norway	Thomas Berntsen	2	7
Czech Republic	Vit Nekovarik	2	7
Japan	Hiroaki Kashiwagi	2	7
England	Daniel Jaeggi	1	8

=== Round robin scores ===
==== Draw 1 ====
Team	1	2	3	4	5	6	7	8	9	10	Final
Sweden (Håkansson) 🔨	1	0	2	0	1	3	0	0	0	X	7
Norway (Berntsen)	0	0	0	1	0	0	1	1	1	X	4

Team	1	2	3	4	5	6	7	8	9	10	Final
Canada (Morris) 🔨	2	0	4	4	3	0	X	X	X	X	13
Germany (Lang)	0	1	0	0	0	0	X	X	X	X	1

Team	1	2	3	4	5	6	7	8	9	10	11	Final
Czech Republic (Nekovarik)	0	1	1	1	0	2	0	1	0	0	1	7
Japan (Kashiwagi) 🔨	2	0	0	0	1	0	1	0	1	1	0	6

Team	1	2	3	4	5	6	7	8	9	10	Final
Scotland (Murdoch)	1	0	2	0	2	0	3	5	X	X	13
England (Jaeggi) 🔨	0	1	0	2	0	1	0	0	X	X	4

Team	1	2	3	4	5	6	7	8	9	10	11	Final
United States (Roza)	0	0	0	1	0	1	1	1	0	1	1	6
Switzerland (Haller) 🔨	2	0	0	0	2	0	0	0	1	0	0	5

==== Draw 2 ====
Team	1	2	3	4	5	6	7	8	9	10	Final
Sweden (Håkansson) 🔨	0	1	0	0	1	0	2	0	0	X	4
Canada (Morris)	1	0	0	2	0	1	0	0	3	X	7

Team	1	2	3	4	5	6	7	8	9	10	Final
Scotland (Murdoch) 🔨	0	0	2	1	0	1	2	0	4	X	10
Germany (Lang)	1	0	0	0	0	0	0	1	0	X	2

Team	1	2	3	4	5	6	7	8	9	10	Final
Switzerland (Haller) 🔨	1	0	0	0	2	0	1	0	1	X	5
Japan (Kashiwagi)	0	0	0	1	0	1	0	1	0	X	3

Team	1	2	3	4	5	6	7	8	9	10	Final
Czech Republic (Nekovarik) 🔨	2	1	0	0	1	0	1	0	0	X	5
United States (Roza)	0	0	1	1	0	1	0	2	2	X	7

Team	1	2	3	4	5	6	7	8	9	10	Final
Norway (Berntsen) 🔨	1	0	1	0	0	0	0	X	X	X	2
England (Jaeggi)	0	1	0	2	3	2	1	X	X	X	9

==== Draw 3 ====
Team	1	2	3	4	5	6	7	8	9	10	11	Final
Sweden (Håkansson)	0	2	0	0	2	0	0	0	2	0	1	7
Japan (Kashiwagi) 🔨	1	0	0	1	0	0	1	1	0	2	0	6

Team	1	2	3	4	5	6	7	8	9	10	Final
Czech Republic (Nekovarik) 🔨	1	1	0	0	1	2	1	0	2	3	11
England (Jaeggi)	0	0	3	2	0	0	0	4	0	0	9

Team	1	2	3	4	5	6	7	8	9	10	Final
Germany (Lang)	0	0	0	0	0	1	0	0	1	X	2
United States (Roza) 🔨	2	0	0	3	0	0	1	1	0	X	7

Team	1	2	3	4	5	6	7	8	9	10	Final
Switzerland (Haller)	0	0	1	1	0	1	2	0	3	X	8
Norway (Berntsen) 🔨	0	1	0	0	1	0	0	1	0	X	10

Team	1	2	3	4	5	6	7	8	9	10	11	Final
Canada (Morris) 🔨	0	0	1	0	2	0	2	0	0	2	1	8
Scotland (Murdoch)	1	2	0	1	0	1	0	1	1	0	0	7

==== Draw 4 ====
Team	1	2	3	4	5	6	7	8	9	10	Final
Sweden (Håkansson)	0	0	0	3	0	0	3	0	2	0	8
United States (Roza) 🔨	0	0	3	0	0	1	0	2	0	1	7

Team	1	2	3	4	5	6	7	8	9	10	Final
Canada (Morris) 🔨	3	0	2	0	2	2	1	0	3	X	13
Norway (Berntsen)	0	1	0	3	0	0	0	1	0	X	5

Team	1	2	3	4	5	6	7	8	9	10	11	Final
Scotland (Murdoch) 🔨	0	2	0	0	0	2	0	0	3	0	1	8
Switzerland (Haller)	0	0	0	0	0	0	6	0	0	1	0	7

Team	1	2	3	4	5	6	7	8	9	10	Final
Germany (Lang) 🔨	0	0	0	2	0	3	1	0	1	X	7
Czech Republic (Nekovarik)	3	1	0	0	0	0	0	1	0	X	5

Team	1	2	3	4	5	6	7	8	9	10	Final
England (Jaeggi)	0	1	1	1	0	1	0	0	0	X	4
Japan (Kashiwagi)	3	0	0	0	3	0	1	1	1	X	9

==== Draw 5 ====
Team	1	2	3	4	5	6	7	8	9	10	Final
Switzerland (Haller)	0	1	0	1	0	4	1	2	1	X	10
Czech Republic (Nekovarik) 🔨	1	0	1	0	1	0	0	0	0	X	3

Team	1	2	3	4	5	6	7	8	9	10	Final
Canada (Morris)	2	0	1	0	2	0	4	3	X	X	13
England (Jaeggi) 🔨	0	1	0	1	0	1	0	0	X	X	3

Team	1	2	3	4	5	6	7	8	9	10	Final
United States (Roza)	0	0	3	0	3	0	0	0	2	X	8
Japan (Kashiwagi) 🔨	1	1	0	1	0	0	2	0	0	X	5

Team	1	2	3	4	5	6	7	8	9	10	Final
Sweden (Håkansson) 🔨	0	1	0	2	0	3	0	0	1	X	7
Scotland (Murdoch)	0	0	1	0	1	0	1	1	0	X	4

Team	1	2	3	4	5	6	7	8	9	10	Final
Norway (Berntsen) 🔨	0	0	0	0	0	1	1	0	1	0	4
Germany (Lang)	0	1	1	0	0	0	0	2	0	0	3

==== Draw 6 ====
Team	1	2	3	4	5	6	7	8	9	10	11	Final
Sweden (Håkansson)	0	0	3	0	1	0	3	0	2	0	1	10
England (Jaeggi) 🔨	1	1	0	1	0	1	0	2	0	3	0	9

Team	1	2	3	4	5	6	7	8	9	10	Final
Canada (Morris)	1	4	5	3	0	2	X	X	X	X	15
Czech Republic (Nekovarik) 🔨	0	0	0	0	3	0	X	X	X	X	3

Team	1	2	3	4	5	6	7	8	9	10	Final
Scotland (Murdoch)	0	0	0	2	1	0	X	X	X	X	3
United States (Roza) 🔨	1	4	2	0	0	5	X	X	X	X	12

Team	1	2	3	4	5	6	7	8	9	10	11	Final
Switzerland (Haller)	0	0	1	0	1	0	0	1	0	1	1	5
Germany (Lang) 🔨	1	1	0	1	0	0	1	0	0	0	0	4

Team	1	2	3	4	5	6	7	8	9	10	Final
Norway (Berntsen)	0	0	1	1	0	0	1	0	2	0	5
Japan (Kashiwagi) 🔨	0	1	0	0	3	1	0	1	0	1	7

==== Draw 7 ====
Team	1	2	3	4	5	6	7	8	9	10	11	Final
Sweden (Håkansson)	0	1	0	0	0	0	2	0	0	1	0	4
Switzerland (Haller) 🔨	2	0	0	0	1	0	0	0	1	0	1	5

Team	1	2	3	4	5	6	7	8	9	10	Final
Canada (Morris) 🔨	2	0	1	3	0	2	1	X	X	X	9
United States (Roza)	0	1	0	0	1	0	0	X	X	X	2

Team	1	2	3	4	5	6	7	8	9	10	Final
Germany (Lang) 🔨	3	0	0	2	0	2	0	0	1	2	10
England (Jaeggi)	0	1	4	0	2	0	1	0	0	0	8

Team	1	2	3	4	5	6	7	8	9	10	Final
Japan (Kashiwagi)	0	0	0	1	0	0	0	1	X	X	2
Scotland (Murdoch) 🔨	1	0	2	0	1	1	1	0	X	X	6

Team	1	2	3	4	5	6	7	8	9	10	Final
Czech Republic (Nekovarik) 🔨	1	0	0	1	0	0	1	1	1	0	5
Norway (Berntsen)	0	1	2	0	3	0	0	0	0	0	6

==== Draw 8 ====
Team	1	2	3	4	5	6	7	8	9	10	Final
Canada (Morris)	1	0	2	0	3	1	0	1	X	X	8
Japan (Kashiwagi) 🔨	0	1	0	1	0	0	1	0	X	X	3

Team	1	2	3	4	5	6	7	8	9	10	Final
Norway (Berntsen) 🔨	1	0	0	2	0	0	1	0	0	X	4
United States (Roza)	0	3	1	0	3	1	0	0	1	X	9

Team	1	2	3	4	5	6	7	8	9	10	Final
Switzerland (Haller)	0	0	2	0	1	1	0	5	X	X	9
England (Jaeggi) 🔨	0	1	0	1	0	0	1	0	X	X	3

Team	1	2	3	4	5	6	7	8	9	10	Final
Sweden (Håkansson) 🔨	1	0	1	1	0	1	0	4	X	X	8
Germany (Lang)	0	0	0	0	2	0	1	0	X	X	3

Team	1	2	3	4	5	6	7	8	9	10	Final
Scotland (Murdoch)	0	5	2	0	3	0	3	X	X	X	13
Czech Republic (Nekovarik) 🔨	1	0	0	1	0	1	0	X	X	X	3

==== Draw 9 ====
Team	1	2	3	4	5	6	7	8	9	10	Final
England (Jaeggi)	0	1	0	0	1	0	1	0	X	X	3
United States (Roza) 🔨	2	0	1	2	0	3	0	2	X	X	10

Team	1	2	3	4	5	6	7	8	9	10	11	Final
Sweden (Håkansson)	0	2	0	1	0	0	1	0	2	0	1	7
Czech Republic (Nekovarik) 🔨	1	0	1	0	1	0	0	1	0	2	0	6

Team	1	2	3	4	5	6	7	8	9	10	Final
Norway (Berntsen)	0	0	1	0	1	0	2	0	0	0	4
Scotland (Murdoch) 🔨	0	1	0	1	0	2	0	1	0	1	6

Team	1	2	3	4	5	6	7	8	9	10	Final
Canada (Morris)	0	0	0	0	0	1	X	X	X	X	1
Switzerland (Haller) 🔨	1	2	4	2	1	0	X	X	X	X	10

Team	1	2	3	4	5	6	7	8	9	10	Final
Japan (Kashiwagi)	0	1	0	0	0	1	1	0	0	X	3
Germany (Lang) 🔨	1	0	0	2	1	0	0	2	4	X	10

=== 7th place tiebreaker ===
Team	1	2	3	4	5	6	7	8	9	10	Final
Czech Republic (Nekovarik) 🔨	1	0	1	0	0	2	0	1	0	X	5
Norway (Berntsen)	0	1	0	0	1	0	2	0	4	X	8

=== Playoffs ===
Semi-final
1	Canada	9
4	Sweden	2
2	Switzerland	5
3	United States	4

Final
1	Canada	6
2	Switzerland	2
Bronze medal
3	United States	7
4	Sweden	5

==== Semifinals ====
Team	1	2	3	4	5	6	7	8	9	10	Final
Sweden (Håkansson)	0	0	1	0	0	1	0	0	X	X	2
Canada (Morris) 🔨	0	2	0	2	1	0	3	1	X	X	9

Team	1	2	3	4	5	6	7	8	9	10	Final
United States (Roza) 🔨	0	0	0	1	1	1	0	0	1	0	4
Switzerland (Haller)	0	0	2	0	0	0	0	2	0	1	5

==== Bronze medal game ====
Team	1	2	3	4	5	6	7	8	9	10	Final
United States (Roza) 🔨	0	2	1	0	0	1	0	0	2	1	7
Sweden (Håkansson)	0	0	0	3	1	0	1	0	0	0	5

==== Gold medal game ====
Team	1	2	3	4	5	6	7	8	9	10	Final
Switzerland (Haller)	0	0	0	0	1	0	1	0	0	X	2
Canada (Morris) 🔨	2	0	0	0	0	1	0	2	1	X	6

== Women's ==
=== Teams ===
Country	Skip	Third	Second	Lead	Alternate
Canada	Marie-France Larouche	Nancy Bélanger	Marie-Eve Létourneau	Valerie Grenier	Véronique Grégoire
France	Audé Bénier	Laure Mutazzi	Stéphanie Jaccaz	Sandrine Morand	Julie Berthet
Germany	Cornelia Stock	Barbara Geiger	Angelika Gföreis	Stefanie Jost	Sandra Waldman
Japan	Akiko Katoh	Yumie Hayashi	Ayumi Onodera	Ai Kobayashi	Shinobu Aota
Norway	Henriette Wang	Linn Githmark	Marianne Rørvik	Camilla Holth	Cathinka Ring Heger
Russia	Nina Golovtchenko	Olga Jarkova	Anastasia Skultan	Anna Rubtsova	Elmira Gouliaeva
Scotland	Kelly Wood	Lorna Vevers	Lindsay Wood	Janie Johnston	Jacqui Reid
Sweden	Matilda Mattsson	Kajsa Bergström	Lisa Löfskog	Jenny Hammarström	Lisa Håkansson
Switzerland	Silvana Tirinzoni	Michèle Knobel	Brigitte Schori	Martina von Arx	Carmen Schäfer
United States	Hope Schmitt	Nikki Baird	Katlyn Schmitt	Teresa Bahr	Amy Becher

=== Round-robin standings ===
Country	Skip	Wins	Losses
Canada	Marie-France Larouche	7	2
Switzerland	Silvana Tirinzoni	7	2
Sweden	Matilda Mattsson	6	3
Japan	Akiko Katoh	6	3
Scotland	Kelly Wood	5	4
United States	Hope Schmitt	5	4
France	Audé Bénier	4	5
Norway	Henriette Wang	3	6
Germany	Cornelia Stock	1	8
Russia	Nina Golovtchenko	1	8

=== Round robin scores ===
==== Draw 1 ====
Team	1	2	3	4	5	6	7	8	9	10	Final
Sweden (Mattsson)	0	1	1	1	3	1	0	1	1	3	12
Russia (Golovtchenko) 🔨	0	0	0	0	0	0	1	0	0	0	1

Team	1	2	3	4	5	6	7	8	9	10	Final
Canada (Larouche)	0	0	3	0	0	1	0	1	1	0	6
United States (Schmitt) 🔨	1	1	0	1	1	0	2	0	0	1	7

Team	1	2	3	4	5	6	7	8	9	10	Final
Germany (Stock) 🔨	1	0	0	0	1	1	1	0	0	X	4
Switzerland (Tirinzoni)	0	0	2	2	0	0	0	3	3	X	10

Team	1	2	3	4	5	6	7	8	9	10	Final
Norway (Wang)	2	0	0	2	1	0	1	0	2	X	8
France (Bénier)	0	2	0	0	0	2	0	1	0	X	5

Team	1	2	3	4	5	6	7	8	9	10	Final
Japan (Katoh) 🔨	0	0	1	0	1	0	1	0	0	X	3
Scotland (Wood)	1	1	0	0	0	2	0	0	2	X	6

==== Draw 2 ====
Team	1	2	3	4	5	6	7	8	9	10	Final
Sweden (Mattsson) 🔨	0	0	3	0	4	0	0	0	3	X	10
Germany (Stock)	1	0	0	2	0	0	1	1	0	X	5

Team	1	2	3	4	5	6	7	8	9	10	Final
Canada (Larouche) 🔨	1	1	0	1	0	1	0	1	2	X	7
Scotland (Wood)	0	0	2	0	0	0	2	0	0	X	4

Team	1	2	3	4	5	6	7	8	9	10	Final
United States (Schmitt) 🔨	3	0	1	0	3	0	0	3	0	X	10
France (Bénier)	0	1	0	1	0	2	0	0	1	X	5

Team	1	2	3	4	5	6	7	8	9	10	Final
Japan (Katoh)	0	1	0	0	2	0	1	0	0	2	6
Norway (Wang) 🔨	1	0	2	0	0	1	0	1	0	0	5

Team	1	2	3	4	5	6	7	8	9	10	Final
Switzerland (Tirinzoni)	1	2	1	0	2	0	0	2	0	0	8
Russia (Golovtchenko) 🔨	0	0	0	1	0	0	1	0	1	1	4

==== Draw 3 ====
Team	1	2	3	4	5	6	7	8	9	10	Final
Sweden (Mattsson)	0	0	0	2	0	2	0	0	3	X	7
Scotland (Wood) 🔨	1	0	0	0	2	0	0	2	0	X	5

Team	1	2	3	4	5	6	7	8	9	10	Final
Canada (Larouche) 🔨	1	1	1	0	1	0	0	2	0	0	6
Switzerland (Tirinzoni)	0	0	0	1	0	2	0	0	1	1	5

Team	1	2	3	4	5	6	7	8	9	10	Final
Germany (Stock)	0	0	1	0	0	0	X	X	X	X	1
Japan (Katoh) 🔨	2	1	0	1	4	2	X	X	X	X	10

Team	1	2	3	4	5	6	7	8	9	10	Final
France (Bénier) 🔨	0	2	1	2	0	0	1	0	2	X	8
Russia (Golovtchenko)	0	0	0	0	1	0	0	2	0	X	3

Team	1	2	3	4	5	6	7	8	9	10	Final
Norway (Wang)	0	2	0	2	1	0	0	0	1	0	6
United States (Schmitt) 🔨	1	0	3	0	0	1	2	1	0	1	9

==== Draw 4 ====
Team	1	2	3	4	5	6	7	8	9	10	Final
United States (Schmitt) 🔨	1	2	0	0	0	2	0	0	0	X	5
Sweden (Mattsson)	0	0	2	1	0	0	1	1	3	X	8

Team	1	2	3	4	5	6	7	8	9	10	Final
Canada (Larouche)	0	2	0	6	2	2	X	X	X	X	12
Germany (Stock) 🔨	0	0	1	0	0	0	X	X	X	X	1

Team	1	2	3	4	5	6	7	8	9	10	Final
Scotland (Wood) 🔨	2	3	0	2	0	1	0	0	0	1	9
Norway (Wang)	0	0	1	0	1	0	2	2	1	0	7

Team	1	2	3	4	5	6	7	8	9	10	Final
Russia (Golovtchenko) 🔨	0	0	1	0	0	1	1	0	2	X	5
Japan (Katoh)	1	3	0	2	1	0	0	1	0	X	8

Team	1	2	3	4	5	6	7	8	9	10	Final
France (Bénier) 🔨	0	0	1	0	1	1	0	0	1	X	4
Switzerland (Tirinzoni)	0	0	0	3	0	0	2	2	0	X	7

==== Draw 5 ====
Team	1	2	3	4	5	6	7	8	9	10	Final
Switzerland (Tirinzoni)	1	0	2	0	1	2	2	0	1	X	9
Sweden (Mattsson) 🔨	0	3	0	1	0	0	0	1	0	X	5

Team	1	2	3	4	5	6	7	8	9	10	Final
Canada (Larouche)	0	0	1	0	0	0	2	1	0	1	5
Norway (Wang)	0	0	0	0	1	1	0	0	1	0	3

Team	1	2	3	4	5	6	7	8	9	10	Final
Russia (Golovtchenko) 🔨	0	2	0	0	0	1	0	1	0	X	4
Germany (Stock)	1	0	0	2	1	0	1	0	1	X	6

Team	1	2	3	4	5	6	7	8	9	10	Final
United States (Schmitt)	0	0	3	0	0	1	0	0	0	X	4
Japan (Katoh) 🔨	1	0	0	1	0	0	3	1	3	X	9

Team	1	2	3	4	5	6	7	8	9	10	Final
France (Bénier) 🔨	0	1	0	1	0	0	4	1	0	1	8
Scotland (Wood)	2	0	1	0	1	0	0	0	2	0	6

==== Draw 6 ====
Team	1	2	3	4	5	6	7	8	9	10	Final
France (Bénier) 🔨	0	0	0	0	0	0	1	0	0	1	2
Sweden (Mattsson)	0	0	0	0	0	0	0	1	0	0	1

Team	1	2	3	4	5	6	7	8	9	10	Final
Canada (Larouche) 🔨	3	0	0	0	1	0	2	0	1	X	7
Japan (Katoh)	0	1	1	1	0	0	0	2	0	X	5

Team	1	2	3	4	5	6	7	8	9	10	Final
Russia (Golovtchenko)	0	0	1	1	0	1	0	1	0	X	4
United States (Schmitt) 🔨	2	1	0	0	4	0	2	0	2	X	11

Team	1	2	3	4	5	6	7	8	9	10	Final
Scotland (Wood)	0	1	2	0	0	1	0	0	1	1	6
Germany (Stock) 🔨	1	0	0	1	1	0	1	1	0	0	5

Team	1	2	3	4	5	6	7	8	9	10	Final
Switzerland (Tirinzoni) 🔨	0	2	3	0	1	0	2	0	3	X	11
Norway (Wang)	0	0	0	1	0	2	0	2	0	X	5

==== Draw 7 ====
Team	1	2	3	4	5	6	7	8	9	10	Final
France (Bénier)	0	1	0	2	0	1	0	0	2	0	6
Canada (Larouche)	3	0	1	0	1	0	2	1	0	1	9

Team	1	2	3	4	5	6	7	8	9	10	Final
Germany (Stock)	0	0	1	0	0	2	0	0	X	X	3
United States (Schmitt)	0	0	0	1	2	0	2	5	X	X	10

Team	1	2	3	4	5	6	7	8	9	10	Final
Switzerland (Tirinzoni)	0	0	1	0	1	2	0	1	0	0	5
Scotland (Wood)	0	1	0	1	0	0	1	0	1	0	4

Team	1	2	3	4	5	6	7	8	9	10	Final
Russia (Golovtchenko)	1	0	1	0	1	0	0	1	0	X	4
Norway (Wang)	0	3	0	1	0	4	1	0	1	X	10

Team	1	2	3	4	5	6	7	8	9	10	11	Final
Sweden (Mattsson)	0	0	1	0	1	1	0	3	0	0	2	8
Japan (Katoh)	1	1	0	0	0	0	1	0	1	2	0	6

==== Draw 8 ====
Team	1	2	3	4	5	6	7	8	9	10	Final
Norway (Wang) 🔨	1	0	1	1	0	1	0	0	0	1	5
Germany (Stock)	0	0	0	0	3	0	0	1	0	0	4

Team	1	2	3	4	5	6	7	8	9	10	Final
Scotland (Wood) 🔨	0	1	0	1	0	0	1	1	3	1	8
Russia (Golovtchenko)	2	0	1	0	1	2	0	0	0	0	6

Team	1	2	3	4	5	6	7	8	9	10	Final
Sweden (Mattsson) 🔨	1	0	1	0	0	0	2	1	0	X	5
Canada (Larouche)	0	1	0	1	1	3	0	0	2	X	8

Team	1	2	3	4	5	6	7	8	9	10	Final
Japan (Katoh)	0	0	1	0	0	0	3	1	0	1	6
France (Bénier) 🔨	2	0	0	0	1	1	0	0	1	0	5

Team	1	2	3	4	5	6	7	8	9	10	Final
United States (Schmitt)	0	1	0	0	1	0	1	1	2	0	6
Switzerland (Tirinzoni) 🔨	1	0	2	1	0	1	0	0	0	3	8

==== Draw 9 ====
Team	1	2	3	4	5	6	7	8	9	10	Final
Canada (Larouche)	2	0	0	1	0	0	1	0	1	0	5
Russia (Golovtchenko) 🔨	0	2	1	0	1	0	0	1	0	2	7

Team	1	2	3	4	5	6	7	8	9	10	Final
Japan (Katoh) 🔨	1	0	2	0	1	2	1	1	X	X	8
Switzerland (Tirinzoni)	0	2	0	0	0	0	0	0	X	X	2

Team	1	2	3	4	5	6	7	8	9	10	Final
Scotland (Wood) 🔨	1	0	1	0	3	0	2	3	X	X	10
United States (Schmitt)	0	2	0	0	0	2	0	0	X	X	2

Team	1	2	3	4	5	6	7	8	9	10	Final
Norway (Wang)	0	1	0	2	0	0	1	0	1	X	5
Sweden (Mattsson) 🔨	1	0	2	0	2	0	0	2	0	X	7

Team	1	2	3	4	5	6	7	8	9	10	Final
Germany (Stock)	0	0	1	0	0	1	0	1	0	X	3
France (Bénier) 🔨	1	0	0	1	1	0	2	0	1	X	6

=== Playoffs ===
Semi-final
1	Canada	6
4	Japan	8
2	Switzerland	5
3	Sweden	3

Final
4	Japan	3
2	Switzerland	8
Bronze medal
1	Canada	10
3	Sweden	3

==== Semifinals ====
Team	1	2	3	4	5	6	7	8	9	10	Final
Switzerland (Tirinzoni)	1	0	0	1	0	1	1	1	0	X	5
Sweden (Mattsson) 🔨	0	0	1	0	1	0	0	0	1	X	3

Team	1	2	3	4	5	6	7	8	9	10	Final
Canada (Larouche)	0	0	2	0	2	0	0	2	0	X	6
Japan (Katoh) 🔨	2	2	0	2	0	0	1	0	1	X	8

==== Bronze medal game ====
Team	1	2	3	4	5	6	7	8	9	10	Final
Canada (Larouche)	1	1	0	2	1	2	0	0	3	X	10
Sweden (Mattsson) 🔨	0	0	1	0	0	0	1	1	0	X	3

==== Gold medal game ====
Team	1	2	3	4	5	6	7	8	9	10	Final
Switzerland (Tirinzoni) 🔨	2	2	1	0	2	0	1	0	X	X	8
Japan (Katoh)	0	0	0	1	0	1	0	1	X	X	3

== Sources ==
- Men's results from the World Curling Federation
- Women's results from the World Curling Federation
