= Jürgen Beck (curler) =

German curler (born 1963)

- Curler ♂
- Born: 29 August 1963 (age 63)

Team
- Curling club: CC Schwenningen, Schwenningen

Curling career
- Member Association: Germany
- World Championship: 1 (2003)
- Other appearances: World Senior Championships: 1 (2016)
Medal record
Curling
German Men's Championship
Gold medal – first place	2003

Jürgen Beck (born 29 August 1963) is a German curler.

At the national level, he is a German men's champion curler (2003).

== Teams ==
Season	Skip	Third	Second	Lead	Alternate	Coach	Events
2002–03	Andreas Lang	Rainer Beiter	Jürgen Beck	Sebastian Schweizer	Jörg Engesser	Dick Henderson (WCC)	GMCC 2003 (gold); WCC 2003 (9th)
2015–16	Uwe Saile	Jürgen Beck	Cristoph Möckel	Jürgen Münch	Matthias Steiner	Alexander Forsyth	WSCC 2016 (9th)
