= Markus Herberg =

German curler and coach

- Curler ♂

Team
- Curling club: EC Oberstdorf, Oberstdorf

Curling career
- Member Association: Germany
- World Championship: 1 (1993)
- Other appearances: World Junior Championships: 4 (1990, 1991, 1992, 1993)
Medal record
Curling
German Men's Championship
Gold medal – first place	1993
World Junior Championships
Bronze medal – third place	Grindelwald 1993

Markus Herberg is a German curler and curling coach.

At the national level, he is a 1993 German men's champion curler.

== Teams ==
Season	Skip	Third	Second	Lead	Alternate	Events
1989–90	Björn Schröder	Mathias Zobel	Markus Herberg	Felix Ogger	Harold Waldvogel	WJCC 1990 (5th)
1990–91	Markus Herberg	Marcus Räderer	Felix Ogger	Martin Beiser	Markus Messenzehl	WJCC 1991 (6th)
1991–92	Markus Herberg	Stephan Knoll	Daniel Herberg	Martin Beiser	Markus Messenzehl	WJCC 1992 (7th)
1992–93	Markus Herberg	Daniel Herberg	Stephan Knoll	Markus Messenzehl	Oliver Trevisiol	WJCC 1993 (bronze)
1992–93	Wolfgang Burba	Bernhard Mayr	Markus Herberg	Daniel Herberg		GMCC 1993 (gold)
1992–93	Wolfgang Burba	Bernhard Mayr	Markus Herberg	Martin Beiser	Daniel Herberg	WCC 1993 (9th)
2011–12	Andy Kapp (fourth)	Wolfgang Burba (skip)	Bernhard Mayr	Markus Herberg	Philip Seitz	

== Record as a coach of national teams ==
Year	Tournament, event	National team	Place
2004	2004 European Curling Championships	Germany (men)	1st place, gold medalist(s)
