= Nicole Strausak =

Swiss curler

Nicole Strausak (born 21 October 1971) is a Swiss curler who retired from competitive curling in March 2005. Amongst other awards, she received a World Junior Silver medal in 1991, a European Silver medal in 1993 and a World Silver medal in 2000. In 1999, at the European Curling Championships in Chamonix, as well as receiving a Bronze medal, she was awarded the Fair Play & Friendly Award by her fellow athletes for her conduct and attitude, on and off the ice.

She coached the Latvian women's team at the 2013 World Women's Curling Championship.
