= Michael Schäffer (curler) =

German curler

Michael Schäffer (born 28 April 1968) is a German curler from Neunburg vorm Wald. Schäffer competed in the 1988 Winter Olympics (demonstration event) and in the 1998 Winter Olympics for the Andy Kapp team. Surprising many, at the 1997 Ford World Men's Curling Championship the team placed second.
