= Oliver Axnick =

German curler

Oliver Axnick Team in 2006
- Curler

Team
- Curling club: CC Füssen
- Skip: Andy Kapp
- Third: Uli Kapp
- Second: Oliver Axnick
- Lead: Holger Höhne
- Alternate: Andreas Kempf

Curling career
- World Championship: 6 (1994, 1995, 1997, 1999, 2001, 2005)
- European Championship: 7 (1992, 1993, 1994, 1995, 1997, 2000, 2005)
- Other appearances: World Senior Curling Championships: 1 (2024)
Medal record
Curling
World Championships
Silver medal – second place	1997 Bern	Team
Bronze medal – third place	1994 Obersdorf	Team
Bronze medal – third place	1995 Brandon	Team
Bronze medal – third place	2005 Victoria	Team
European Championships
Gold medal – first place	1992 Perth	Team
Gold medal – first place	1997 Füssen	Team

Oliver Axnick (born 17 May 1970 in Füssen) is a German curler.

Axnick has begun to curl at the age of 16. He reached two European Championships, 1992 in Perth and 1997 in Füssen. After his retirement as a curler 2006, he was coach of the German men's curling team until the 2010 Winter Olympics in Vancouver.

== Teammates ==
2006 Turin Olympic Games

- Andy Kapp (skip)
- Uli Kapp (third)
- Holger Höhne (lead)
- Andreas Kempf (alternate)
