= Christopher Bartsch =

German curler

Personal information
- Nationality: German
- Born: 6 August 1979 (age 46) Hamburg, Germany

Sport
- Sport: Curling

Christopher Bartsch (born 6 August 1979) is a German curler. He was born in Hamburg. He competed at the 2011 European Curling Championships in Moscow, and at the 2014 Winter Olympics in Sochi. He has also worked as television reporter on the sport of curling.
