= Martin Beiser =

German curler and coach

- Curler ♂
- Born: 4 March 1971 (age 55); Oberstdorf

Team
- Curling club: EC Oberstdorf

Curling career
- Member Association: Germany
- World Championship: 2 (1992, 1993)
Medal record
Curling
Representing Germany
German Men's Championship
Gold medal – first place	1992

Martin Beiser (born 4 March 1971 in Oberstdorf) is a former German curler and curling coach.

He is a former German men's curling champion (1992).

== Awards and honours ==
- World Junior Curling Championships All-Star Team, Men: 1992.

== Teams ==
Season	Skip	Third	Second	Lead	Alternate	Events
1990–91	Markus Herberg	Marcus Räderer	Felix Ogger	Martin Beiser	Markus Messenzehl	WJCC 1991 (6th)
1991–92	Markus Herberg	Stephan Knoll	Daniel Herberg	Martin Beiser	Markus Messenzehl	WJCC 1992 (7th)
1991–92	Rodger Gustaf Schmidt	Wolfgang Burba	Hans-Joachim Burba	Bernhard Mayr	Martin Beiser	GMCC 1992 (gold); WCC 1992 (9th)
1992–93	Wolfgang Burba	Bernhard Mayr	Markus Herberg	Martin Beiser	Daniel Herberg	WCC 1993 (9th)

== Record as a coach of national teams ==
Year	Tournament, event	National team	Place
2008	2008 European Junior Challenge Competition	Germany (junior women)	1st place, gold medalist(s)
2009	2009 European Junior Challenge Competition	Germany (junior women)	4
2010	2010 European Curling Championships	Germany (men)	4
2011	2011 European Junior Curling Challenge	Germany (junior women)	2nd place, silver medalist(s)
2011	2011 Winter Universiade	Germany (junior women)	8
2011	2011 World Men's Curling Championship	Germany (men)	6
2012	2012 World Women's Curling Championship	Germany (women)	7
2012	2012 World Men's Curling Championship	Germany (men)	11
2012	2012 European Curling Championships	Germany (men)	9
2012	2012 European Curling Championships	Germany (women)	7
2013	2013 European Curling Championships	Germany (men)	11
2013	2013 Olympic Qualifying Event	Germany (men)	1st place, gold medalist(s)
2014	2014 Winter Olympics	Germany (men)	10
2014	2014 World Men's Curling Championship	Germany (men)	8
2014	2014 European Curling Championships	Germany (men)	8
2016	2016 European Curling Championships	Germany (men)	5
2017	2017 European Curling Championships	Germany (men)	5
2017	2017 Olympic Qualification Event	Germany (men)	7
2018	2018 World Men's Curling Championship	Germany (men)	13
2018	2018 European Curling Championships	Germany (men)	4
