= Holger Höhne =

German curler (born 1970)

- Curler
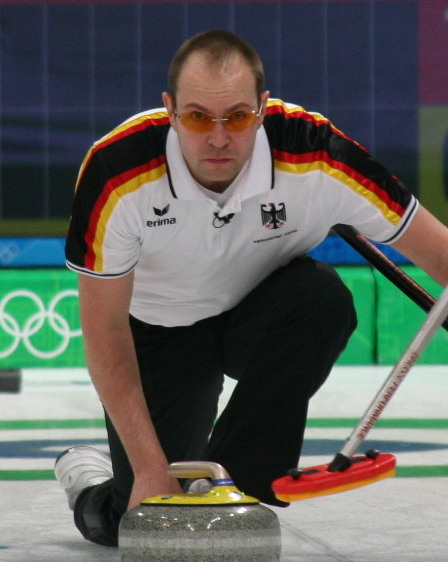
- Born: May 6, 1970 (age 56); Füssen, West Germany

Curling career
- Olympic: 3 (1998, 2006, 2010)
- Other appearances: World Senior Curling Championships: 1 (2024)
Medal record
Men's Curling
World Curling Championships
| Silver medal – second place | 1997 Berne |
| Silver medal – second place | 2007 Edmonton |
| Bronze medal – third place | 1994 Oberstdorf |
| Bronze medal – third place | 1995 Brandon |
| Bronze medal – third place | 2005 Victoria |
European Curling Championships
| Gold medal – first place | 1992 Perth |
| Gold medal – first place | 1997 Füssen |
| Bronze medal – third place | 2008 Örnsköldsvik |
European Mixed Championship
| Gold medal – first place | 2013 Edinburgh |

Holger "Holgi" Höhne (born 6 May 1970 in Füssen) is a German curler. He was a longtime member of the Andy Kapp rink. Currently, he coaches the German national women's team.

Höhne has been playing with Kapp since 1992. However, he was only the team's alternate until joining the team as a regular thrower in 1995 at the lead position. Höhne's first tournament as lead was the 1995 Ford World Curling Championships, were the team won a bronze medal. This was added to Höhne's bronze medal at the 1994 Worlds as an alternate and a gold at the 1992 European Curling Championships.

While playing lead for the team, Höhne won silver at the 1997 Ford World Curling Championships, a gold at the 1997 European Championships and a bronze at the 2005 Ford World Men's Curling Championship. He was also a member of the German team that finished eighth at the 1998 and 2006 Winter Olympics and sixth at the 2010 Winter Olympics.

Beginning in 2005, the German team experimented with a 5-player team where the three front-end players would alternate in games. This proved to be successful somewhat successful, winning a silver medal at the 2007 Ford World Men's Curling Championship. While Höhne was officially listed as the team's alternate, he did play 10 matches. This team format was only used again the following season, with less success. They finished in 5th at the 2007 European Curling Championships and 8th place at the 2008 World Men's Curling Championship. After the 2008 Worlds, the team reverted to the normal four-player team. Höhne was back as the team's lead for the 2008 European Championships, where he won a bronze medal. He played second for the team at the 2009 Ford World Men's Curling Championship in the absence of third Uli Kapp.

== Personal life ==
Höhne is employed as an optometrist and is married. He coaches his daughter Mia Höhne on the German National Women's Team.
