= Manuel Walter =

German curler

Manuel Walter (born 11 March 1986 in Gernsbach, West Germany) is a German curler, currently playing third on the team of Alexander Baumann. Walter has competed at the 2016 and 2017 World Men's Curling Championships.
