= Sebastian Stock =

German curler

Sebastian Stock (born 15 November 1977 in Immenstadt, Bavaria) is a German curler living in Bönigen, Switzerland. He is currently the national coach of the Swiss Curling Association.

Stock's junior career included a silver medal at the 1995 World Junior Curling Championships and a bronze medal the following year. In 1995 he played third for Daniel Herberg and they lost to Tom Brewster, Jr.'s Scotland team in the final. Stock skipped the 1996 team.

In 2002 Stock and his German team captured their first European Curling Championships after three previous tries. They defeated Peja Lindholm of Sweden in the final. Earlier that year Stock skipped Germany to a sixth-place finish at the 2002 Winter Olympics. In 2004, Stock lost to Lindholm in the finals of the 2004 Ford World Curling Championships. Later that year Stock captured his second European Championship once again defeating Lindholm.

== Personal life ==
Stock is married and has two children.
