= John Jahr =

German curler and Olympian

- Curler
- Born: 10 April 1965 (age 61); Hamburg, West Germany

Curling career
- World Championship: 4 (1987, 1996, 2012, 2014)
- European Championship: 4 (1985, 1990, 2011, 2013)
- Olympic: 1 (2014)
Medal record
Curling
Representing Germany
World Curling Championships
Silver medal – second place	1987 Vancouver
European Curling Championships
Gold medal – first place	1985 Grindelwald

John "Johnny" Jahr (born 10 April 1965 in Hamburg) is a retired German curler.

== Career ==
Jahr was the skip of the German team at the 1984 World Junior Curling Championships, where he led the team to a 7th-place finish. After juniors, he was picked up by Rodger Gustaf Schmidt to play second for him. It was as a member of the Schmidt team that Jahr won a gold medal at the 1985 European Curling Championships and a silver medal at the 1987 Hexagon World Men's Curling Championship. The team represented Germany at the 1990 European Curling Championship as well, but placed tenth.

Jahr would later leave the Schmidt team to form his own team. He skipped the German team to a 9th place at the 1996 Ford World Men's Curling Championship and a 7th-place finish at the 2011 European Curling Championships. He skipped Germany at the 2012 World Men's Curling Championship to an 11th-place finish. Jahr then led Germany to an 11th-place finish at the 2013 European Curling Championships.

Germany's poor performances in recent World Championships failed to automatically qualify the nation for the 2014 Winter Olympics. However, Jahr led Germany to a surprising win at the Olympic qualifying tournament, giving the team a berth at the Olympics. At the Olympic Games, Jahr led Germany to a 10th-place finish with a 1–8 record. Jahr also played at the 2014 World Men's Curling Championship, where Germany finished in eighth place with a 5–6 win–loss record. Jahr announced his retirement from international curling at the conclusion of the round robin at the World Championship.

== Personal life ==
Jahr owns part of the German publishing company Gruner + Jahr, which was co-founded by his grandfather. Jahr also owns a real estate company and is a shareholder in multiple casinos. He took time off from curling beginning in the late 1990s to focus on his business interests.

Jahr's father founded Curling Club Hamburg.
