= Andreas Lang =

German curler (born 1979)

- Curler
- Born: 26 April 1979 (age 47); Schwenningen, West Germany

Curling career
- World Championship: 6 (2003, 2007, 2008, 2009, 2010, 2011)
- European Championship: 4 (2007, 2008, 2009, 2012)
- Olympic: 1 (2010)
Medal record
Men's curling
World Curling Championships
Silver medal – second place	2007 Edmonton
European Curling Championships
Bronze medal – third place	2008 Örnsköldsvik

Andreas "Al" Lang (born 26 April 1979) is a German curler from Alterschrofen. He is the former third for Andy Kapp.

== Career ==
Lang began his international career skipping the German junior team at the 1999 World Junior Curling Championships, where he finished 6th. He skipped the main German national team at the 2003 Ford World Men's Curling Championship, finishing in 9th place.

In 2007, Lang moved to the Andy Kapp rink, playing second for him. He earned a silver medal at the 2007 Ford World Men's Curling Championship in his first international event with the team. Later that year, he finished 5th at the 2007 European Curling Championships. Later that season, Lang was promoted to the third position on the team, and placed 8th at the 2008 World Men's Curling Championship, but then won a bronze medal at the 2008 European Curling Championships.

He competed at the 2010 Winter Olympics for Germany, finishing in sixth position.
