= Daniel Herberg =

German curler (born 1974)

Daniel Herberg (born 7 March 1974) is an internationally elite curler from Germany.

Daniel Herberg was born in Oberstdorf, West Germany. He has been selected as the Alternate for Team Germany at the 2010 Winter Olympics in Vancouver, British Columbia, Canada.

Herberg also competed at the 2002 Salt Lake City Olympics on the German team that placed sixth with a 4 - 5 record.

Herberg Is Employed As A Project Developer

== Teammates ==
2010 Vancouver Olympic Games

Andreas Kapp, Skip

Andreas Lang, Third

Holger Höhne, Second

Andreas Kempf, Lead

2002 Salt Lake City Olympic Games

Sebastian Stock, Skip

Stephan Knoll, Second

Markus Messenzehl, Lead

Patrick Hoffman, Alternate
