= Ole Ingvaldsen =

Norwegian curler and coach

- Curler ♂
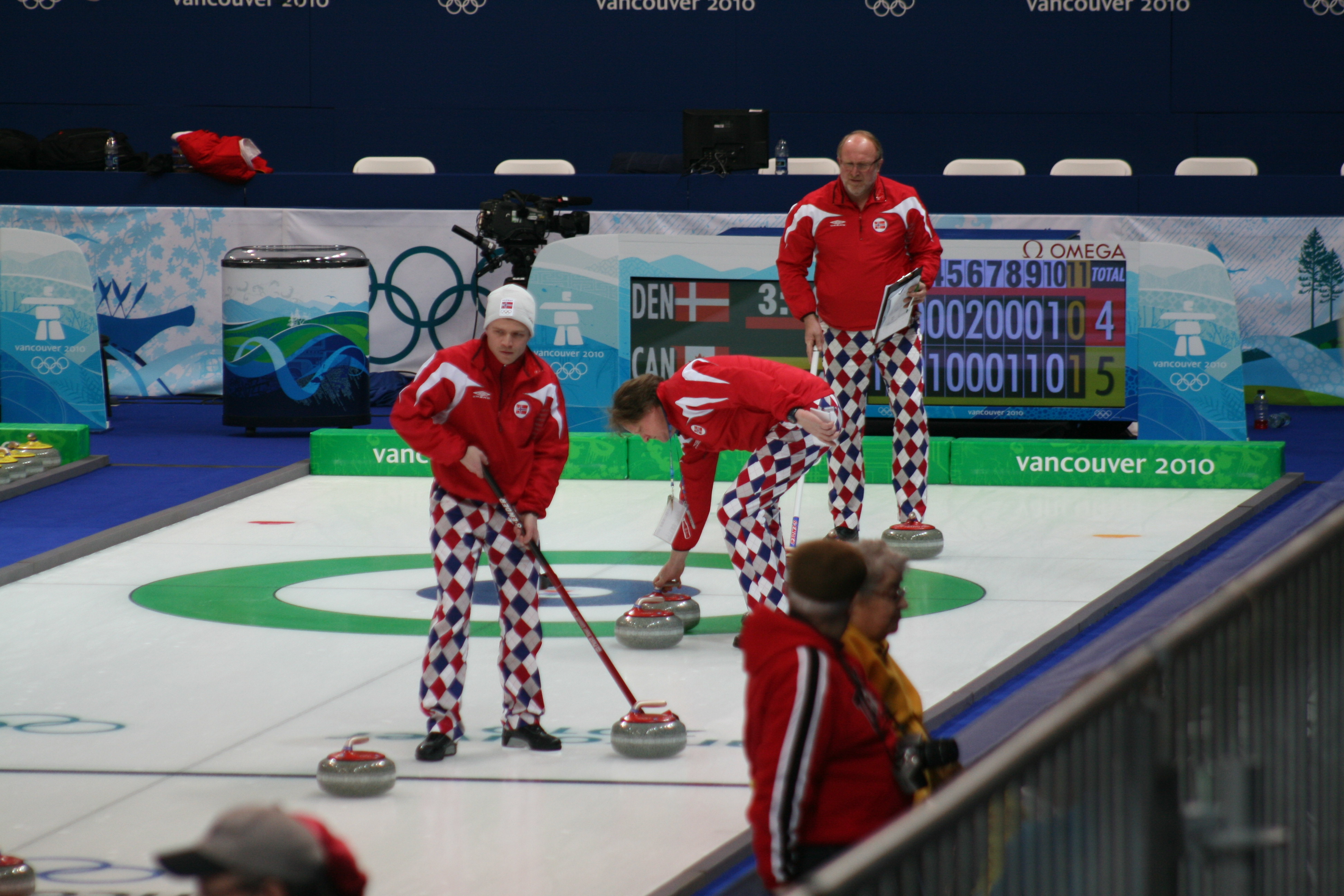
- Born: 29 August 1948 (age 78); Stavanger

Team
- Curling club: Snarøen CC, Oslo

Curling career
- Member Association: Norway
Medal record
Curling

Ole Ingvaldsen (born 29 August 1948 in Stavanger) is a Norwegian curler and curling coach.

As a coach of Norwegian national teams he participated in 2002, 2006, 2010 Winter Olympics, in 2014 Winter Paralympics and big lot of World and European championships.

He is a member of Board of Directors in Norwegian Curling Association (Norwegian: Norges Curlingforbund).

== Teams ==
| Season | Skip | Third | Second | Lead | Alternate | Events |
|---|---|---|---|---|---|---|
| 1999–00 | Pål Trulsen | Lars Vågberg | Flemming Davanger | Bent Ånund Ramsfjell | Ole Ingvaldsen | ECC 1999 (5th) |

== Record as a coach of national teams ==
| Year | Tournament, event | National team | Place |
|---|---|---|---|
| 1999 | 1999 World Men's Curling Championship | Norway (men) | 5 |
| 2000 | 2000 World Men's Curling Championship | Norway (men) | 7 |
| 2000 | 2000 European Curling Championships | Norway (men) | 5 |
| 2000 | 2000 European Curling Championships | Norway (women) | 2nd place, silver medalist(s) |
| 2001 | 2001 World Men's Curling Championship | Norway (men) | 3rd place, bronze medalist(s) |
| 2001 | 2001 European Curling Championships | Norway (men) | 4 |
| 2001 | 2001 European Curling Championships | Norway (women) | 5 |
| 2002 | 2002 Winter Olympics | Norway (men) | 1st place, gold medalist(s) |
| 2002 | 2002 World Junior Curling Championships | Norway (junior men) | 8 |
| 2002 | 2002 World Men's Curling Championship | Norway (men) | 2nd place, silver medalist(s) |
| 2002 | 2002 European Curling Championships | Norway (men) | 3rd place, bronze medalist(s) |
| 2003 | 2003 Winter Universiade | Norway (students men) | 7 |
| 2003 | 2003 World Junior Curling Championships | Norway (junior women) | 8 |
| 2003 | 2003 World Men's Curling Championship | Norway (men) | 3rd place, bronze medalist(s) |
| 2003 | 2003 European Curling Championships | Norway (men) | 5 |
| 2004 | 2004 World Junior Curling Championships | Norway (junior women) | 1st place, gold medalist(s) |
| 2004 | 2004 World Men's Curling Championship | Norway (men) | 4 |
| 2004 | 2004 European Curling Championships | Norway (men) | 3rd place, bronze medalist(s) |
| 2005 | 2005 World Junior Curling Championships | Norway (junior women) | 6 |
| 2005 | 2005 World Women's Curling Championship | Norway (women) | 3rd place, bronze medalist(s) |
| 2005 | 2005 World Men's Curling Championship | Norway (men) | 4 |
| 2005 | 2005 European Curling Championships | Norway (men) | 1st place, gold medalist(s) |
| 2006 | 2006 Winter Olympics | Norway (men) | 5 |
| 2006 | 2006 World Junior Curling Championships | Norway (junior women) | 5 |
| 2006 | 2006 World Women's Curling Championship | Norway (women) | 7 |
| 2006 | 2006 World Men's Curling Championship | Norway (men) | 3rd place, bronze medalist(s) |
| 2007 | 2007 World Junior Curling Championships | Norway (junior women) | 6 |
| 2007 | 2007 World Men's Curling Championship | Norway (men) | 8 |
| 2007 | 2007 European Curling Championships | Norway (men) | 2nd place, silver medalist(s) |
| 2008 | 2008 World Men's Curling Championship | Norway (men) | 3rd place, bronze medalist(s) |
| 2008 | 2008 European Curling Championships | Norway (men) | 2nd place, silver medalist(s) |
| 2009 | 2009 European Junior Challenge Competition | Norway (junior women) | 7 |
| 2009 | 2009 Winter Universiade | Norway (students men) | 2nd place, silver medalist(s) |
| 2009 | 2009 World Men's Curling Championship | Norway (men) | 3rd place, bronze medalist(s) |
| 2009 | 2009 European Curling Championships | Norway (men) | 3rd place, bronze medalist(s) |
| 2010 | 2010 Winter Olympics | Norway (men) | 2nd place, silver medalist(s) |
| 2010 | 2010 World Men's Curling Championship | Norway (men) | 2nd place, silver medalist(s) |
| 2010 | 2010 European Curling Championships | Norway (men) | 1st place, gold medalist(s) |
| 2011 | 2011 World Men's Curling Championship | Norway (men) | 4 |
| 2011 | 2011 European Curling Championships | Norway (men) | 1st place, gold medalist(s) |
| 2012 | 2012 World Men's Curling Championship | Norway (men) | 4 |
| 2012 | 2012 European Curling Championships | Norway (men) | 2nd place, silver medalist(s) |
| 2013 | 2013 World Junior Curling Championships | Norway (junior men) | 5 |
| 2013 | 2013 World Men's Curling Championship | Norway (men) | 5 |
| 2013 | 2013 European Curling Championships | Hungary (women) | 16 |
| 2013 | 2013 Winter Universiade | Norway (students men) | 4 |
| 2014 | 2014 Winter Paralympics | Norway (wheelchair) | 8 |
| 2014 | 2014 World Mixed Doubles Curling Championship | Norway (mixed doubles) | 5 |
| 2014 | 2014 European Curling Championships | Norway (women) | 11 |
| 2015 | 2015 Winter Universiade | Norway (students men) | 1st place, gold medalist(s) |
| 2015 | 2015 World Women's Curling Championship | Norway (women) | 12 |
| 2015 | 2015 World Mixed Doubles Curling Championship | Norway (mixed doubles) | 3rd place, bronze medalist(s) |
| 2015 | 2015 World Mixed Curling Championship | Norway (mixed) | 1st place, gold medalist(s) |
| 2015 | 2015 European Curling Championships | Norway (women) | 8 |
| 2016 | 2016 World Mixed Doubles Curling Championship | Norway (mixed doubles) | 9 |
| 2016 | 2016 World Mixed Curling Championship | Norway (mixed) | 24 |
| 2016 | 2016 European Curling Championships | Norway (women) | 9 |
