= 2001 World Men's Curling Championship =

- Host city: Lausanne, Switzerland
- Arena: Malley Sports Centre
- Dates: March 31 – April 8, 2001
- Winner: Sweden
- Curling club: Östersunds CK
- Skip: Peja Lindholm
- Third: Tomas Nordin
- Second: Magnus Swartling
- Lead: Peter Narup
- Alternate: Anders Kraupp
- Coach: Mats Nyberg
- Finalist: Switzerland (Christof Schwaller)

The 2001 World Men's Curling Championship (branded as 2001 Ford World Men's Curling Championship for sponsorship reasons) was held March 31 to April 8, 2001, at the Malley Sports Centre in Lausanne, Switzerland.

== Teams ==
Canada	Denmark	Finland	France	Germany
Ottewell CC, Edmonton, Alberta Fourth: David Nedohin; Skip: Randy Ferbey; Second: Scott Pfeifer; Lead: Marcel Rocque; Alternate: Dan Holowaychuk	Hvidovre CC Skip: Johnny Frederiksen; Third: Henrik Jakobsen; Second: Lars Vilandt; Lead: Bo Jensen; Alternate: Gert Larsen	Hyvinkää CC Skip: Markku Uusipaavalniemi; Third: Wille Mäkelä; Second: Tommi Häti; Lead: Jari Laukkanen; Alternate: Pekka Saarelainen	Chamonix CC Skip: Dominique Dupont-Roc; Third: Jan Henri Ducroz; Second: Thomas Dufour; Lead: Spencer Mugnier; Alternate: Philippe Caux	Füssen CC Skip: Andy Kapp; Third: Uli Kapp; Second: Oliver Axnick; Lead: Holger Höhne; Alternate: Patrick Hoffman
New Zealand	Norway	Sweden	Switzerland	United States
Dunedin CC Skip: Dan Mustapic; Third: Sean Becker; Second: Hans Frauenlob; Lead: Lorne De Pape; Alternate: Jim Allan	Stabekk CC, Oslo Skip: Pål Trulsen; Third: Lars Vågberg; Second: Flemming Davanger; Lead: Bent Ånund Ramsfjell; Alternate: Tore Torvbråten	Östersunds CK Skip: Peter Lindholm; Third: Tomas Nordin; Second: Magnus Swartling; Lead: Peter Narup; Alternate: Anders Kraupp	Biel-Touring CC, Biel Skip: Christof Schwaller; Third: Andreas Schwaller; Second: Damian Grichting; Lead: Markus Eggler; Alternate: Marco Ramstein	Granite CC, Seattle, Washington Skip: Jason Larway; Third: Greg Romaniuk; Second: Travis Way; Lead: Joel Larway; Alternate: Doug Kaufmann

== Round-robin standings ==
Key
Teams to playoffs

Country	Skip	W	L
Sweden	Peja Lindholm	7	2
Canada	Randy Ferbey	6	3
Switzerland	Christof Schwaller	6	3
Norway	Pål Trulsen	6	3
Finland	Markku Uusipaavalniemi	5	4
France	Dominique Dupont-Roc	4	5
Germany	Andy Kapp	4	5
United States	Jason Larway	4	5
New Zealand	Dan Mustapic	2	7
Denmark	Johnny Frederiksen	1	8

== Round-robin results ==
=== Draw 1 ===
Sheet A	Final
Canada (Ferbey)	9
Norway (Trulsen)	13

Sheet B	Final
New Zealand (Mustapic)	4
France (Dupont-Roc)	8

Sheet C	Final
United States (Larway)	6
Switzerland (Schwaller)	7

Sheet D	Final
Denmark (Frederiksen)	6
Finland (Uusipaavalniemi)	7

Sheet E	Final
Sweden (Lindholm)	9
Germany (Kapp)	5

=== Draw 2 ===
Sheet A	Final
Sweden (Lindholm)	6
New Zealand (Mustapic)	4

Sheet B	Final
Switzerland (Schwaller)	4
Germany (Kapp)	3

Sheet C	Final
Canada (Ferbey)	11
Denmark (Frederiksen)	0

Sheet D	Final
United States (Larway)	6
Norway (Trulsen)	5

Sheet E	Final
France (Dupont-Roc)	4
Finland (Uusipaavalniemi)	8

=== Draw 3 ===
Sheet A	Final
Finland (Uusipaavalniemi)	4
Germany (Kapp)	7

Sheet B	Final
Norway (Trulsen)	6
Denmark (Frederiksen)	5

Sheet C	Final
France (Dupont-Roc)	3
Sweden (Lindholm)	7

Sheet D	Final
Switzerland (Schwaller)	3
Canada (Ferbey)	9

Sheet E	Final
United States (Larway)	4
New Zealand (Mustapic)	5

=== Draw 4 ===
Sheet A	Final
Norway (Trulsen)	10
France (Dupont-Roc)	7

Sheet B	Final
United States (Larway)	3
Canada (Ferbey)	10

Sheet C	Final
New Zealand (Mustapic)	3
Germany (Kapp)	8

Sheet D	Final
Finland (Uusipaavalniemi)	8
Sweden (Lindholm)	4

Sheet E	Final
Denmark (Frederiksen)	2
Switzerland (Schwaller)	8

=== Draw 5 ===
Sheet A	Final
United States (Larway)	7
Sweden (Lindholm)	6

Sheet B	Final
France (Dupont-Roc)	7
Switzerland (Schwaller)	3

Sheet C	Final
Norway (Trulsen)	9
Finland (Uusipaavalniemi)	2

Sheet D	Final
New Zealand (Mustapic)	6
Denmark (Frederiksen)	4

Sheet E	Final
Germany (Kapp)	5
Canada (Ferbey)	7

=== Draw 6 ===
Sheet A	Final
Germany (Kapp)	10
Denmark (Frederiksen)	7

Sheet B	Final
Canada (Ferbey)	2
Finland (Uusipaavalniemi)	8

Sheet C	Final
Switzerland (Schwaller)	6
New Zealand (Mustapic)	5

Sheet D	Final
France (Dupont-Roc)	3
United States (Larway)	6

Sheet E	Final
Norway (Trulsen)	6
Sweden (Lindholm)	9

=== Draw 7 ===
Sheet A	Final
New Zealand (Mustapic)	3
Canada (Ferbey)	9

Sheet B	Final
Germany (Kapp)	5
Norway (Trulsen)	7

Sheet C	Final
Denmark (Frederiksen)	5
France (Dupont-Roc)	6

Sheet D	Final
Sweden (Lindholm)	9
United States (Larway)	2

Sheet E	Final
Finland (Uusipaavalniemi)	4
United States (Larway)	9

=== Draw 8 ===
Sheet A	Final
Switzerland (Schwaller)	9
Finland (Uusipaavalniemi)	5

Sheet B	Final
Denmark (Frederiksen)	5
Sweden (Lindholm)	6

Sheet C	Final
Germany (Kapp)	8
United States (Larway)	6

Sheet D	Final
Norway (Trulsen)	7
New Zealand (Mustapic)	6

Sheet E	Final
Canada (Ferbey)	11
France (Dupont-Roc)	5

=== Draw 9 ===
Sheet A	Final
Denmark (Frederiksen)	8
United States (Larway)	3

Sheet B	Final
Finland (Uusipaavalniemi)	10
New Zealand (Mustapic)	3

Sheet C	Final
Sweden (Lindholm)	11
Canada (Ferbey)	7

Sheet D	Final
Germany (Kapp)	4
France (Dupont-Roc)	10

Sheet E	Final
Switzerland (Schwaller)	5
Norway (Trulsen)	4

== Playoffs ==
=== Brackets ===
Semi-final
1	Sweden	4
4	Norway	3
2	Canada	5
3	Switzerland	6

Final
1	Sweden	6
3	Switzerland	3
Bronze medal
4	Norway	10
2	Canada	9

=== Final ===
Sheet A	1	2	3	4	5	6	7	8	9	10	Final
Switzerland (Schwaller)	0	1	0	0	0	0	1	0	1	0	3
Sweden (Lindholm)	1	0	1	0	0	0	0	3	0	1	6

2001 Ford World Curling Championship
(Sweden)
Sweden
4th title
