= 2000 World Women's Curling Championship =

- Host city: Glasgow, Scotland
- Arena: Braehead Arena
- Dates: April 1–9, 2000
- Winner: Canada
- Curling club: Richmond WC, Vancouver, British Columbia
- Skip: Kelley Law
- Third: Julie Skinner
- Second: Georgina Wheatcroft
- Lead: Diane Nelson
- Alternate: Cheryl Noble
- Coach: Elaine Dagg-Jackson
- Finalist: Switzerland (Luzia Ebnöther)

The 2000 World Women's Curling Championship (branded as 2000 Ford World Women's Curling Championship for sponsorship reasons) was held at the Braehead Arena in Renfrew, Scotland from April 1–9, 2000.

== Teams ==
| Canada | Denmark | France | Germany | Japan |
|---|---|---|---|---|
| Richmond WC, Richmond, British Columbia Skip: Kelley Law; Third: Julie Skinner; Second: Georgina Wheatcroft; Lead: Diane Nelson; Alternate: Cheryl Noble | Hvidovre CC Skip: Lene Bidstrup; Third: Malene Krause; Second: Susanne Slotsager; Lead: Avijaja Petri; Alternate: Lisa Richardson | St Gervais CC Skip: Audé Bénier; Third: Stéphanie Jaccaz; Second: Fabienne Morand; Lead: Sandrine Morand; Alternate: Laure Mutazzi | CC Füssen Skip: Petra Tschetsch; Third: Daniela Jentsch; Second: Karin Fischer; Lead: Gesa Angrick; Alternate: Elisabeth Ländle | Kitami CC, Kitami Skip: Yukari Okazaki; Third: Emi Fujiwara; Second: Shinobu Aota; Lead: Eriko Minatoya; Alternate: Kotomi Ishizaki |
| Norway | Scotland | Sweden | Switzerland | United States |
| Snarøen CC, Oslo Skip: Dordi Nordby; Third: Hanne Woods; Second: Marianne Aspelin; Lead: Cecilie Torhaug; Alternate: Kristin Tøsse Løvseth | Reform & Greenacres CC, Renfrewshire Skip: Rhona Martin; Third: Margaret Morton; Second: Fiona MacDonald; Lead: Janice Watt; Alternate: Deborah Knox | Umeå CK Skip: Elisabet Gustafson; Third: Katarina Nyberg; Second: Louise Marmont; Lead: Elisabeth Persson; Alternate: Christina Bertrup | CC Bern Skip: Luzia Ebnöther; Third: Nicole Strausak; Second: Tanya Frei; Lead: Nadia Raspe; Alternate: Laurence Bidaud | Duluth CC, Duluth, Minnesota Skip: Amy Wright; Third: Amy Becher; Second: Joni Cotten; Lead: Natalie Simenson; Alternate: Corina Marquardt |

== Round-robin standings ==
| Country | Skip | W | L |
|---|---|---|---|
| Canada | Kelley Law | 7 | 2 |
| Norway | Dordi Nordby | 7 | 2 |
| Switzerland | Luzia Ebnöther | 6 | 3 |
| Scotland | Rhona Martin | 6 | 3 |
| Sweden | Elisabet Gustafson | 5 | 4 |
| Denmark | Lene Bidstrup | 4 | 5 |
| Germany | Petra Tschetsch | 4 | 5 |
| United States | Amy Wright | 4 | 5 |
| Japan | Yukari Okazaki | 2 | 7 |
| France | Audé Bénier | 0 | 9 |

== Round-robin results ==
=== Draw 1 ===
| Sheet A | Final |
| France (Bénier) | 4 |
| Canada (Law) | 9 |

| Sheet B | Final |
| United States (Wright) | 8 |
| Denmark (Bidstrup) | 5 |

| Sheet C | Final |
| Sweden (Gustafson) | 9 |
| Japan (Okazaki) | 7 |

| Sheet D | Final |
| Norway (Nordby) | 9 |
| Germany (Tschetsch) | 2 |

| Sheet E | Final |
| Scotland (Martin) | 2 |
| Switzerland (Ebnöther) | 10 |

=== Draw 2 ===
| Sheet A | Final |
| Germany (Tschetsch) | 5 |
| Denmark (Bidstrup) | 11 |

| Sheet B | Final |
| Switzerland (Ebnöther) | 6 |
| Sweden (Gustafson) | 5 |

| Sheet C | Final |
| France (Bénier) | 2 |
| United States (Wright) | 8 |

| Sheet D | Final |
| Japan (Okazaki) | 1 |
| Scotland (Martin) | 9 |

| Sheet E | Final |
| Canada (Law) | 9 |
| Norway (Nordby) | 5 |

=== Draw 3 ===
| Sheet A | Final |
| Sweden (Gustafson) | 13 |
| France (Bénier) | 5 |

| Sheet B | Final |
| Japan (Okazaki) | 6 |
| Norway (Nordby) | 10 |

| Sheet C | Final |
| Denmark (Bidstrup) | 8 |
| Scotland (Martin) | 10 |

| Sheet D | Final |
| Switzerland (Ebnöther) | 6 |
| Canada (Law) | 5 |

| Sheet E | Final |
| United States (Wright) | 4 |
| Germany (Tschetsch) | 8 |

=== Draw 4 ===
| Sheet A | Final |
| Canada (Law) | 7 |
| United States (Wright) | 6 |

| Sheet B | Final |
| Scotland (Martin) | 9 |
| France (Bénier) | 2 |

| Sheet C | Final |
| Germany (Tschetsch) | 8 |
| Switzerland (Ebnöther) | 3 |

| Sheet D | Final |
| Denmark (Bidstrup) | 10 |
| Japan (Okazaki) | 2 |

| Sheet E | Final |
| Norway (Nordby) | 7 |
| Sweden (Gustafson) | 0 |

=== Draw 5 ===
| Sheet A | Final |
| Japan (Okazaki) | 1 |
| Switzerland (Ebnöther) | 8 |

| Sheet B | Final |
| Norway (Nordby) | 8 |
| United States (Wright) | 7 |

| Sheet C | Final |
| Scotland (Martin) | 9 |
| Sweden (Gustafson) | 4 |

| Sheet D | Final |
| Germany (Tschetsch) | 7 |
| France (Bénier) | 5 |

| Sheet E | Final |
| Denmark (Bidstrup) | 1 |
| Canada (Law) | 8 |

=== Draw 6 ===
| Sheet A | Final |
| Scotland (Martin) | 6 |
| Germany (Tschetsch) | 8 |

| Sheet B | Final |
| Denmark (Bidstrup) | 11 |
| Switzerland (Ebnöther) | 6 |

| Sheet C | Final |
| Norway (Nordby) | 6 |
| France (Bénier) | 3 |

| Sheet D | Final |
| Canada (Law) | 7 |
| Sweden (Gustafson) | 3 |

| Sheet E | Final |
| Japan (Okazaki) | 2 |
| United States (Wright) | 11 |

=== Draw 7 ===
| Sheet A | Final |
| Denmark (Bidstrup) | 7 |
| Norway (Nordby) | 8 |

| Sheet B | Final |
| Sweden (Gustafson) | 13 |
| Germany (Tschetsch) | 3 |

| Sheet C | Final |
| Japan (Okazaki) | 4 |
| Canada (Law) | 6 |

| Sheet D | Final |
| Scotland (Martin) | 8 |
| United States (Wright) | 7 |

| Sheet E | Final |
| Switzerland (Ebnöther) | 9 |
| France (Bénier) | 4 |

=== Draw 8 ===
| Sheet A | Final |
| United States (Wright) | 6 |
| Sweden (Gustafson) | 12 |

| Sheet B | Final |
| Canada (Law) | 6 |
| Scotland (Martin) | 9 |

| Sheet C | Final |
| Switzerland (Ebnöther) | 6 |
| Norway (Nordby) | 5 |

| Sheet D | Final |
| France (Bénier) | 4 |
| Denmark (Bidstrup) | 9 |

| Sheet E | Final |
| Germany (Tschetsch) | 6 |
| Japan (Okazaki) | 8 |

=== Draw 9 ===
| Sheet A | Final |
| Norway (Nordby) | 8 |
| Scotland (Martin) | 7 |

| Sheet B | Final |
| France (Bénier) | 6 |
| Japan (Okazaki) | 7 |

| Sheet C | Final |
| Switzerland (Ebnöther) | 7 |
| United States (Wright) | 8 |

| Sheet D | Final |
| Canada (Law) | 8 |
| Germany (Tschetsch) | 6 |

| Sheet E | Final |
| Sweden (Gustafson) | 9 |
| Denmark (Bidstrup) | 3 |

== Playoffs ==
=== Brackets ===
Semi-final
1 | Canada | 10
4 | Scotland | 6
2 | Norway | 4
3 | Switzerland | 5

Final
1 | Canada | 7
3 | Switzerland | 6
Bronze medal
2 | Norway | 10
4 | Scotland | 5

=== Final ===
| Sheet A | 1 | 2 | 3 | 4 | 5 | 6 | 7 | 8 | 9 | 10 | Final |
|---|---|---|---|---|---|---|---|---|---|---|---|
| Switzerland (Ebnöther) | 0 | 2 | 0 | 1 | 0 | 1 | 0 | 0 | 2 | 0 | 6 |
| Canada (Law) | 1 | 0 | 2 | 0 | 1 | 0 | 1 | 1 | 0 | 1 | 7 |
