= 2001 European Curling Championships =

International curling competition

The 2001 European Curling Championships were held in Vierumäki, Finland, from 8 to 15 December.

== Men's ==
=== A tournament ===
==== Final round-robin standings ====
Team	Skip	W	L
Sweden	Peja Lindholm	7	2
Switzerland	Andreas Schwaller	7	2
Norway	Pål Trulsen	6	3
Finland	Markku Uusipaavalniemi	6	3
Scotland	Hammy McMillan	5	4
Denmark	Lasse Lavrsen	4	5
France	Thierry Mercier	4	5
Germany	Sebastian Stock	3	6
Czech Republic	Petr Stepanek	2	7
Italy	Alessandro Lettieri	1	8

==== Draws ====
===== Draw 1 =====
Denmark 10–3 Finland
Sweden 4–3 Switzerland
Norway 8–5 Germany
Scotland 8–5 France
Czech Republic 6–5 Italy

===== Draw 2 =====
Sweden 8–6 Italy
Germany 9–1 Czech Republic
Finland 7–1 France
Norway 6–3 Denmark
Switzerland 6–1 Scotland

===== Draw 3 =====
Scotland 9–5 Czech Republic
France 8–7 Denmark
Switzerland 6–5 Italy
Finland 8–4 Germany
Norway 7–5 Sweden

===== Draw 4 =====
Switzerland 8–7 Denmark
Norway 8–4 Finland
Sweden 9–5 Czech Republic
Scotland 9–2 Italy
Germany 9–2 France

===== Draw 5 =====
Norway 11–5 Italy
Switzerland 8–4 Germany
Scotland 7–5 Denmark
Sweden 8–1 France
Finland 8–4 Czech Republic

===== Draw 6 =====
France 7–5 Czech Republic
Finland 11–6 Scotland
Sweden 9–8 Germany
Switzerland 9–3 Norway
Italy 7–6 Denmark

===== Draw 7 =====
Sweden 7–6 Finland
Denmark 9–8 Czech Republic
Switzerland 6–5 France
Germany 11–3 Italy
Norway 6–3 Scotland

===== Draw 8 =====
Scotland 9–4 Germany
France 6–4 Italy
Czech Republic 8–7 Norway
Denmark 7–6 Sweden
Finland 7–2 Switzerland

===== Draw 9 =====
France 10–6 Norway
Sweden 11–5 Scotland
Finland 9–3 Italy
Switzerland 9–2 Czech Republic
Denmark 7–6 Germany

==== Playoffs ====
Semi-final
1	Sweden	7
4	Finland	4
3	Norway	7
2	Switzerland	8

Final
1	Sweden	5
2	Switzerland	4
Bronze medal
4	Finland	6
3	Norway	4

==== Medals ====
Medal	Team
Gold	Sweden (Peja Lindholm, Tomas Nordin, Magnus Swartling, Peter Narup, and Anders Kraupp)
Silver	Switzerland (Andreas Schwaller, Christof Schwaller, Markus Eggler, Damian Grichting, and Marco Ramstein)
Bronze	Finland (Markku Uusipaavalniemi, Wille Mäkelä, Tommi Häti, Jari Laukkanen, and Pekka Saarelainen)

== Women's ==
=== A tournament ===
==== Final round-robin standings ====
Team	Skip	W	L
Sweden	Anette Norberg	7	0
Germany	Andrea Schöpp	6	1
Denmark	Lene Bidstrup	5	2
Switzerland	Luzia Ebnöther	4	3
Norway	Dordi Nordby	3	4
Scotland	Rhona Martin	2	5
Russia	Olga Jarkova	1	6
Finland	Jaana Jokela	0	7

==== Draws ====
===== Draw 1 =====
Sweden 7–6 Norway
Germany 8–5 Switzerland
Denmark 10–4 Scotland
Russia 4–3 Finland

===== Draw 2 =====
Denmark 8–5 Finland
Scotland 7–3 Russia
Germany 9–2 Norway
Sweden 5–4 Switzerland

===== Draw 3 =====
Germany 5–4 Scotland
Sweden 8–3 Finland
Switzerland 10–4 Russia
Denmark 9–6 Norway

===== Draw 4 =====
Denmark 7–3 Switzerland
Norway 5–4 Russia
Sweden 5–4 Scotland
Germany 8–6 Finland

===== Draw 5 =====
Sweden 9–3 Russia
Germany 9–4 Denmark
Switzerland 8–6 Finland
Norway 10–9 Scotland

===== Draw 6 =====
Switzerland 7–4 Norway
Scotland 10–2 Finland
Sweden 9–5 Germany
Denmark 10–8 Russia

===== Draw 7 =====
Germany 6–5 Russia
Sweden 11–4 Denmark
Norway 7–5 Finland
Switzerland 7–4 Scotland

==== Playoffs ====
Semi-final
1	Sweden	8
4	Switzerland	7
3	Denmark	6
2	Germany	4

Final
1	Sweden	7
3	Denmark	3
Bronze medal
4	Switzerland	8
2	Germany	7

==== Medals ====
Medal	Team
Gold	Sweden (Anette Norberg, Cathrine Norberg, Eva Lund, Maria Hasselborg, and Anna Rindeskog)
Silver	Denmark (Lene Bidstrup, Susanne Slotsager, Malene Krause, Avijaja Lund Nielsen, and Lisa Richardson)
Bronze	Switzerland (Luzia Ebnöther, Mirjam Ott, Tanya Frei, Nadia Röthlisberger, and Laurence Bidaud)
