= Marc Haudenschild =

Swiss curler

- Curler ♂

Team
- Curling club: Thun Center, Thun, St Moritz CC

Curling career
- Member Association: Switzerland
- World Championship: 1 (1998)
- Other appearances: World Junior Championships: 2 (1987, 1989)
Medal record
Curling
Swiss Men's Championship
Gold medal – first place	1998 Bern
World Junior Championships
Bronze medal – third place	1989 Markham

Marc Haudenschild is a Swiss curler.

At the national level, he is a 1998 Swiss men's champion curler and two-time Swiss junior champion curler (1986, 1988).

== Awards ==
- World Junior Curling Championships All-Star Team: 1989

== Teams ==
Season	Skip	Third	Second	Lead	Alternate	Coach	Events
1986–87	Markus Eggler	Marc Haudenschild	Frank Kobel	Reto Huber			SJCC 1986 (gold); WJCC 1987 (4th)
1988–89	Markus Eggler	Marc Haudenschild	Frank Kobel	Reto Huber	Stefan Traub (WJCC)		SJCC 1988 (gold); WJCC 1989 (bronze)
1997–98	Andreas Schwaller	Marc Haudenschild	Reto Ziegler	Rolf Iseli	Robert Hürlimann (WCC)	Frédéric Jean (WCC)	SMCC 1998 (gold); WCC 1998 (8th)
2004–05	Marc Haudenschild	Bohren Heinz	Adrian Trosch	Jurg Thoni			
2005–06	Mario Flückiger	Marc Haudenschild	Heinz Bohren	Jurg Thoni			
2006–07	Mario Flückiger	Marc Haudenschild	Heinz Bohren	Nicolas Hauswirth			
2008–09	Björn Zryd	Marc Haudenschild	Stefan Maurer	Martin Stucki	Simon Gempeler		
