= Margaret Morton =

Scottish curler (born 1968)

Medal record

Curling

Representing Great Britain

Olympic Games
Gold medal – first place	2002 Salt Lake	Women's tournament

Margaret Morton MBE (born 29 January 1968) is a Scottish curler and Olympic champion. She received a gold medal at the 2002 Winter Olympics in Salt Lake City with teammates Rhona Martin (skip), Deborah Knox, Fiona MacDonald, and Janice Rankin.

She was appointed Member of the Order of the British Empire (MBE) in the 2002 Birthday Honours.
