= Brian Hansen =

Brian Hansen may refer to:

- Brian Hansen (American football) (born 1960), former American football punter in the National Football League
- Brian Hansen (curler) (born 1972), Danish curler, 2002 Winter Olympics participant
- Brian Hansen (speed skater) (born 1990), American speed skater
