= Grichting =

Grichting is a surname. Notable people with the surname include:

- Damian Grichting (born 1973), Swiss curler
- Stéphane Grichting (born 1979), Swiss footballer
