= Janice Rankin =

Scottish curler

Medal record

Curling

Representing Great Britain

Olympic Games
Gold medal – first place	2002 Salt Lake	Women's tournament

Representing Scotland

World Championships
Silver medal – second place	1994 Oberstdorf	

European Championships
Silver medal – second place	1998 Flims	

World Junior Championships
Gold medal – first place	1992 Oberstdorf	
Bronze medal – third place	1991 Glasgow	

Janice Rankin MBE (born 8 February 1972 as Janice Watt) is a Scottish curler and Olympic champion. She received a gold medal at the 2002 Winter Olympics in Salt Lake City, with teammates Rhona Martin (skip), Deborah Knox, Fiona MacDonald and Margaret Morton.

She had been a pupil at The Mary Erskine School in Edinburgh.
