= Christof Schwaller =

Swiss curler and Olympic medalist

- Curler
- Born: 3 October 1966 (age 60)

Team
- Curling club: CC St. Moritz
- Skip: Christof Schwaller
- Third: Robert Hürlimann
- Second: Christoph Kaiser
- Lead: Rolf Iseli
- Alternate: Pierre Hug

Curling career
- Member Association: Switzerland
- World Championship: 5 (1995, 1998, 2001, 2005, 2010)
- European Championship: 4 (2000, 2001, 2004, 2008)
- Other appearances: World Senior Curling Championships: 1 (2024)
Medal record
Men's curling
Representing Switzerland
Olympic Games
Bronze medal – third place	2002 Salt Lake City	Team
World Championships
Silver medal – second place	2001 Lausanne	Team
World Senior Championships
Bronze medal – third place	2023 Gangneung

Christof Schwaller (born 3 October 1966) is a Swiss curler and Olympic medalist. He received a bronze medal at the 2002 Winter Olympics in Salt Lake City.

He played for the Swiss team at the 1998 (as skip), 2001 (as skip) and 2005 world championships, with the silver medal in 2001 as the best achievement. He also won an Olympic bronze medal at the 2002 Winter Olympics.

He was skip for the Swiss team that reached the bronze final at the 1988 World Junior Curling Championships in Füssen (finishing fourth).

His brother is Andreas Schwaller. His sons are Yannick Schwaller and Kim Schwaller.

== Teammates ==
2002 Salt Lake City Olympic Games

Andreas Schwaller, Skip

Markus Eggler, Second

Damian Grichting, Lead

Marco Ramstein, Alternate
