= 2004 European Curling Championships =

International curling competition

The 2004 European Curling Championships were held in Sofia, Bulgaria from December 4 to 11.

== Men's ==
=== A tournament ===
==== Final round robin standings ====
Team	Skip	W	L
Sweden	Peja Lindholm	8	1
Germany	Sebastian Stock	8	1
Norway	Pål Trulsen	5	4
Scotland	David Murdoch	5	4
Italy	Stefano Ferronato	5	4
Denmark	Ulrik Schmidt	4	5
Switzerland	Andreas Schwaller	3	6
Russia	Alexander Kirikov	3	6
Wales	Adrian Meikle	3	6
France	Thierry Mercier	1	8

==== Draws ====
===== Draw 1 =====
December 4th, 14:00

Sheet A	1	2	3	4	5	6	7	8	9	10	Final
Wales (Meikle) 🔨	0	0	0	2	0	2	0	0	1	2	7
Switzerland (Schwaller)	0	0	0	0	2	0	3	1	0	0	6

Sheet B	1	2	3	4	5	6	7	8	9	10	Final
Norway (Trulsen)	0	3	0	2	3	0	1	0	X	X	9
France (Mercier) 🔨	1	0	1	0	0	1	0	1	X	X	4

Sheet C	1	2	3	4	5	6	7	8	9	10	Final
Russia (Kirikov) 🔨	0	1	0	0	1	1	0	2	0	2	7
Denmark (Schmidt)	0	0	0	1	0	0	2	0	3	0	6

Sheet D	1	2	3	4	5	6	7	8	9	10	Final
Italy (Ferronato)	1	0	0	0	0	1	0	X	X	X	2
Germany (Stock) 🔨	0	0	0	3	2	0	4	X	X	X	9

Sheet E	1	2	3	4	5	6	7	8	9	10	Final
Scotland (Murdoch) 🔨	1	0	0	0	0	2	0	X	X	X	3
Sweden (Lindholm)	0	4	1	1	1	0	2	X	X	X	9

===== Draw 2 =====
December 5th, 8:00

Sheet A	1	2	3	4	5	6	7	8	9	10	Final
Scotland (Murdoch)	0	1	0	0	0	0	0	0	2	0	3
Norway (Trulsen) 🔨	1	0	2	0	2	1	0	0	0	1	7

Sheet B	1	2	3	4	5	6	7	8	9	10	Final
Denmark (Schmidt) 🔨	1	0	4	0	0	0	1	0	0	1	7
Sweden (Lindholm)	0	2	0	2	1	1	0	0	3	0	9

Sheet C	1	2	3	4	5	6	7	8	9	10	11	Final
Wales (Meikle) 🔨	0	2	2	2	1	0	0	1	0	0	0	8
Italy (Ferronato)	1	0	0	0	0	3	1	0	2	1	1	9

Sheet D	1	2	3	4	5	6	7	8	9	10	Final
Russia (Kirikov) 🔨	1	0	1	0	0	0	1	0	0	0	3
Switzerland (Schwaller)	0	1	0	2	0	1	0	1	2	0	7

Sheet E	1	2	3	4	5	6	7	8	9	10	11	Final
France (Mercier) 🔨	1	0	2	0	0	0	1	0	1	1	0	6
Germany (Stock)	0	2	0	0	2	1	0	1	0	0	1	7

===== Draw 3 =====
December 5th, 16:00

Sheet A	1	2	3	4	5	6	7	8	9	10	Final
Germany (Stock)	0	0	0	0	0	1	0	2	0	0	3
Sweden (Lindholm) 🔨	0	0	1	0	0	0	2	0	0	1	4

Sheet B	1	2	3	4	5	6	7	8	9	10	Final
Switzerland (Schwaller)	0	3	0	0	0	1	0	1	0	1	6
Italy (Ferronato) 🔨	0	0	3	1	1	0	1	0	1	0	7

Sheet C	1	2	3	4	5	6	7	8	9	10	11	Final
France (Mercier) 🔨	0	0	2	0	1	0	0	0	1	1	0	5
Scotland (Murdoch)	0	2	0	1	0	0	1	1	0	0	1	6

Sheet D	1	2	3	4	5	6	7	8	9	10	Final
Denmark (Schmidt)	0	2	0	2	0	0	2	0	1	2	9
Wales (Meikle) 🔨	1	0	1	0	1	2	0	1	0	0	6

Sheet E	1	2	3	4	5	6	7	8	9	10	Final
Russia (Kirikov)	0	0	0	0	1	0	0	X	X	X	1
Norway (Trulsen) 🔨	1	0	1	2	0	4	2	X	X	X	10

===== Draw 4 =====
December 6th, 9:00

Sheet A	1	2	3	4	5	6	7	8	9	10	Final
Switzerland (Schwaller) 🔨	2	0	1	1	1	3	0	X	X	X	8
France (Mercier)	0	1	0	0	0	0	1	X	X	X	2

Sheet B	1	2	3	4	5	6	7	8	9	10	Final
Russia (Kirikov) 🔨	2	0	3	0	1	0	0	0	1	0	7
Wales (Meikle)	0	1	0	0	0	1	1	1	0	1	5

Sheet C	1	2	3	4	5	6	7	8	9	10	Final
Norway (Trulsen) 🔨	0	0	0	0	1	0	0	1	0	X	2
Sweden (Lindholm)	0	0	0	1	0	2	1	0	3	X	7

Sheet D	1	2	3	4	5	6	7	8	9	10	Final
Germany (Stock) 🔨	2	0	0	0	1	2	2	0	0	X	7
Scotland (Murdoch)	0	0	2	1	0	0	0	1	0	X	4

Sheet E	1	2	3	4	5	6	7	8	9	10	Final
Italy (Ferronato)	0	0	0	0	1	1	1	3	0	0	6
Denmark (Schmidt) 🔨	0	1	0	1	0	0	0	0	2	1	5

===== Draw 5 =====
December 6th, 19:00

Sheet A	1	2	3	4	5	6	7	8	9	10	Final
Russia (Kirikov)	0	1	0	1	0	0	1	0	0	0	3
Scotland (Murdoch) 🔨	0	0	1	0	0	2	0	2	1	0	6

Sheet B	1	2	3	4	5	6	7	8	9	10	Final
France (Mercier) 🔨	0	0	1	1	0	1	0	2	0	0	5
Denmark (Schmidt)	1	2	0	0	2	0	1	0	1	3	10

Sheet C	1	2	3	4	5	6	7	8	9	10	11	Final
Switzerland (Schwaller) 🔨	0	0	0	1	1	0	1	1	0	1	0	5
Germany (Stock)	0	0	1	0	0	3	0	0	1	0	1	6

Sheet D	1	2	3	4	5	6	7	8	9	10	Final
Norway (Trulsen)	0	0	0	0	1	1	0	0	1	0	3
Italy (Ferronato) 🔨	0	1	0	0	0	0	2	1	0	1	5

Sheet E	1	2	3	4	5	6	7	8	9	10	Final
Sweden (Lindholm) 🔨	0	0	0	2	0	0	1	0	3	1	7
Wales (Meikle)	0	0	0	0	1	1	0	1	0	0	3

===== Draw 6 =====
December 7th, 12:00

Sheet A	1	2	3	4	5	6	7	8	9	10	Final
Sweden (Lindholm)	0	0	1	0	2	2	2	0	0	X	7
Italy (Ferronato) 🔨	0	0	0	1	0	0	0	2	0	X	3

Sheet B	1	2	3	4	5	6	7	8	9	10	Final
Wales (Meikle)	0	0	2	0	0	0	1	0	1	X	4
Germany (Stock) 🔨	2	2	0	1	0	0	0	2	0	X	7

Sheet C	1	2	3	4	5	6	7	8	9	10	11	Final
Denmark (Schmidt) 🔨	2	0	0	3	0	0	1	0	0	1	0	7
Norway (Trulsen)	0	3	1	0	1	0	0	1	1	0	1	8

Sheet D	1	2	3	4	5	6	7	8	9	10	Final
France (Mercier) 🔨	1	0	1	1	0	4	1	1	X	X	9
Russia (Kirikov)	0	1	0	0	1	0	0	0	X	X	2

Sheet E	1	2	3	4	5	6	7	8	9	10	Final
Switzerland (Schwaller)	0	0	0	1	1	0	1	0	2	0	5
Scotland (Murdoch) 🔨	0	0	1	0	0	2	0	1	0	2	6

===== Draw 7 =====
December 7th, 20:00

Sheet A	1	2	3	4	5	6	7	8	9	10	11	Final
Norway (Trulsen)	2	0	0	0	1	0	1	0	0	3	0	7
Wales (Meikle) 🔨	0	1	0	2	0	2	0	0	2	0	1	8

Sheet B	1	2	3	4	5	6	7	8	9	10	11	Final
Sweden (Lindholm) 🔨	0	0	2	0	0	0	0	2	0	2	0	6
Switzerland (Schwaller)	0	0	0	0	0	2	0	0	4	0	1	7

Sheet C	1	2	3	4	5	6	7	8	9	10	11	Final
Italy (Ferronato) 🔨	1	0	0	3	0	2	0	0	2	0	2	10
France (Mercier)	0	0	1	0	1	0	3	1	0	2	0	8

Sheet D	1	2	3	4	5	6	7	8	9	10	Final
Scotland (Murdoch)	0	0	1	0	0	2	0	2	0	X	5
Denmark (Schmidt) 🔨	0	2	0	1	2	0	2	0	2	X	9

Sheet E	1	2	3	4	5	6	7	8	9	10	Final
Germany (Stock) 🔨	1	0	0	2	1	0	0	1	1	0	6
Russia (Kirikov)	0	2	0	0	0	1	0	0	0	0	3

===== Draw 8 =====
December 8th, 14:00

Sheet A	1	2	3	4	5	6	7	8	9	10	11	Final
Denmark (Schmidt)	0	2	0	2	0	3	0	0	1	0	0	8
Germany (Stock) 🔨	1	0	1	0	1	0	3	0	0	2	1	9

Sheet B	1	2	3	4	5	6	7	8	9	10	Final
Italy (Ferronato)	0	0	1	0	2	0	X	X	X	X	3
Scotland (Murdoch) 🔨	2	0	0	3	0	4	X	X	X	X	9

Sheet C	1	2	3	4	5	6	7	8	9	10	Final
Sweden (Lindholm)	0	1	1	2	2	0	3	X	X	X	9
Russia (Kirikov) 🔨	1	0	0	0	0	2	0	X	X	X	3

Sheet D	1	2	3	4	5	6	7	8	9	10	Final
Switzerland (Schwaller) 🔨	1	0	0	1	0	0	X	X	X	X	2
Norway (Trulsen)	0	0	4	0	2	4	X	X	X	X	10

Sheet E	1	2	3	4	5	6	7	8	9	10	Final
Wales (Meikle) 🔨	1	0	0	0	1	2	0	5	X	X	9
France (Mercier)	0	1	0	0	0	0	1	0	X	X	2

===== Draw 9 =====
December 9th, 8:00

Sheet A	1	2	3	4	5	6	7	8	9	10	11	Final
Italy (Ferronato)	0	0	0	1	0	1	0	2	0	0	0	4
Russia (Kirikov) 🔨	0	1	0	0	0	0	2	0	0	1	1	5

Sheet B	1	2	3	4	5	6	7	8	9	10	Final
Germany (Stock)	0	0	2	2	0	0	1	2	0	1	8
Norway (Trulsen) 🔨	0	1	0	0	2	0	0	0	2	0	5

Sheet C	1	2	3	4	5	6	7	8	9	10	Final
Scotland (Murdoch) 🔨	4	0	0	3	0	3	X	X	X	X	10
Wales (Meikle)	0	1	0	0	2	0	X	X	X	X	3

Sheet D	1	2	3	4	5	6	7	8	9	10	Final
Sweden (Lindholm) 🔨	0	1	1	0	0	0	2	0	0	1	5
France (Prunet)	0	0	0	1	0	0	0	1	1	0	3

Sheet E	1	2	3	4	5	6	7	8	9	10	Final
Denmark (Schmidt)	0	0	1	1	1	0	1	2	0	1	7
Switzerland (Schwaller) 🔨	1	1	0	0	0	0	0	0	2	0	4

==== Tie breaker ====
December 9th, 16:00

Sheet C	1	2	3	4	5	6	7	8	9	10	Final
Scotland (Murdoch) 🔨	0	1	0	0	1	0	0	2	2	0	6
Italy (Ferronato)	0	0	1	1	0	1	1	0	0	0	4

==== Playoffs ====
Semi-final
1	Sweden	6
4	Scotland	4
2	Germany	8
3	Norway	6

Final
1	Sweden	7
2	Germany	8
Bronze medal
4	Scotland	2
3	Norway	8

===== Semifinals =====
December 10th, 16:00

Sheet C	1	2	3	4	5	6	7	8	9	10	11	Final
Scotland (Murdoch)	0	0	1	0	2	0	0	0	0	1	0	4
Sweden (Lindholm) 🔨	0	1	0	1	0	1	0	0	1	0	2	6

Sheet C	1	2	3	4	5	6	7	8	9	10	Final
Germany (Stock) 🔨	0	1	0	4	0	0	0	0	3	0	8
Norway (Trulsen)	2	0	1	0	0	0	2	0	0	1	6

===== Bronze-medal game =====
December 11th, 14:00

Sheet D	1	2	3	4	5	6	7	8	9	10	Final
Scotland (Murdoch)	0	1	1	0	0	0	0	0	0	X	2
Norway (Trulsen) 🔨	2	0	0	0	0	2	2	0	2	X	8

===== Gold-medal game =====
December 11th, 14:00

Sheet C	1	2	3	4	5	6	7	8	9	10	11	Final
Sweden (Lindholm)	0	0	2	1	0	2	0	1	0	1	0	7
Germany (Stock) 🔨	0	1	0	0	2	0	1	0	3	0	1	8

==== Medals ====
Medal	Team
Gold	Germany (Sebastian Stock, Daniel Herberg, Stephan Knoll, Markus Messenzehl, and Patrick Hoffman)
Silver	Sweden (Peja Lindholm, Tomas Nordin, Magnus Swartling, Peter Narup, and Anders Kraupp)
Bronze	Norway (Pål Trulsen, Lars Vågberg, Flemming Davanger, Bent Ånund Ramsfjell, and Niels Siggaard Andersen)

== Women's ==
=== A tournament ===
==== Final round robin standings ====
Team	Skip	W	L
Switzerland	Mirjam Ott	6	3
Norway	Dordi Nordby	6	3
Sweden	Anette Norberg	6	3
Russia	Olga Jarkova	5	4
Scotland	Kelly Wood	5	4
Italy	Diana Gaspari	5	4
Finland	Kirsi Nykänen	4	5
Denmark	Madeleine Dupont	3	6
Germany	Daniela Jentsch	3	6
Czech Republic	Hana Synáčková	2	7

==== Draws ====
===== Draw 1 =====
December 4th, 9:00

Sheet A	1	2	3	4	5	6	7	8	9	10	Final
Norway (Nordby)	0	0	1	2	0	2	0	3	0	0	8
Russia (Jarkova) 🔨	0	2	0	0	1	0	1	0	2	1	7

Sheet B	1	2	3	4	5	6	7	8	9	10	Final
Italy (Gaspari)	0	0	2	3	0	0	0	0	0	X	5
Switzerland (Ott) 🔨	0	3	0	0	1	2	1	2	1	X	10

Sheet C	1	2	3	4	5	6	7	8	9	10	Final
Sweden (Norberg)	0	2	2	0	3	0	0	3	X	X	10
Czech Republic (Synáčková) 🔨	1	0	0	1	0	1	1	0	X	X	4

Sheet D	1	2	3	4	5	6	7	8	9	10	Final
Scotland (Wood) 🔨	4	0	6	3	0	2	X	X	X	X	15
Finland (Nykänen)	0	1	0	0	1	0	X	X	X	X	2

Sheet E	1	2	3	4	5	6	7	8	9	10	Final
Germany (Jentsch) 🔨	1	0	2	0	1	0	1	2	0	0	7
Denmark (Dupont)	0	2	0	2	0	1	0	0	4	2	11

===== Draw 2 =====
December 4th, 19:00

Sheet A	1	2	3	4	5	6	7	8	9	10	Final
Germany (Jentsch) 🔨	2	4	0	1	0	0	1	0	2	0	10
Italy (Gaspari)	0	0	3	0	1	2	0	1	0	1	8

Sheet B	1	2	3	4	5	6	7	8	9	10	Final
Czech Republic (Synáčková) 🔨	2	0	1	0	0	2	0	0	1	0	6
Denmark (Dupont)	0	2	0	1	0	0	2	1	0	1	7

Sheet C	1	2	3	4	5	6	7	8	9	10	Final
Norway (Nordby)	0	0	1	0	1	0	2	0	2	0	6
Scotland (Wood) 🔨	1	2	0	1	0	1	0	4	0	2	11

Sheet D	1	2	3	4	5	6	7	8	9	10	Final
Sweden (Norberg) 🔨	0	0	2	0	3	0	0	3	0	0	8
Russia (Jarkova)	1	0	0	2	0	0	1	0	2	0	5

Sheet E	1	2	3	4	5	6	7	8	9	10	Final
Switzerland (Ott) 🔨	2	3	4	0	1	1	X	X	X	X	11
Finland (Nykänen)	0	0	0	2	0	0	X	X	X	X	2

===== Draw 3 =====
December 5th, 12:00

Sheet A	1	2	3	4	5	6	7	8	9	10	Final
Finland (Nykänen) 🔨	3	0	0	1	0	1	2	0	0	1	8
Denmark (Dupont)	0	3	1	0	1	0	0	2	0	0	7

Sheet B	1	2	3	4	5	6	7	8	9	10	Final
Russia (Jarkova)	0	1	0	0	1	0	1	0	1	1	5
Scotland (Wood) 🔨	2	0	1	1	0	3	0	1	0	0	8

Sheet C	1	2	3	4	5	6	7	8	9	10	11	Final
Switzerland (Ott)	0	3	1	0	0	1	0	0	1	0	1	7
Germany (Jentsch) 🔨	1	0	0	1	1	0	0	2	0	1	0	6

Sheet D	1	2	3	4	5	6	7	8	9	10	Final
Czech Republic (Synáčková)	0	0	0	0	0	0	X	X	X	X	0
Norway (Nordby) 🔨	1	2	1	5	2	1	X	X	X	X	12

Sheet E	1	2	3	4	5	6	7	8	9	10	Final
Sweden (Norberg)	0	0	0	0	2	0	2	0	0	X	4
Italy (Gaspari) 🔨	0	3	2	1	0	2	0	1	1	X	10

===== Draw 4 =====
December 5th, 20:00

Sheet A	1	2	3	4	5	6	7	8	9	10	Final
Russia (Jarkova) 🔨	1	1	0	1	0	0	1	0	1	0	5
Switzerland (Ott)	0	0	1	0	1	0	0	1	0	1	4

Sheet B	1	2	3	4	5	6	7	8	9	10	Final
Sweden (Norberg) 🔨	1	0	0	2	0	0	2	0	1	0	6
Norway (Nordby)	0	1	2	0	2	2	0	2	0	2	11

Sheet C	1	2	3	4	5	6	7	8	9	10	Final
Italy (Gaspari) 🔨	4	0	0	0	2	0	2	0	1	1	10
Denmark (Dupont)	0	1	1	2	0	1	0	1	0	0	6

Sheet D	1	2	3	4	5	6	7	8	9	10	Final
Finland (Nykänen) 🔨	3	0	2	0	1	0	1	0	1	0	8
Germany (Jentsch)	0	0	0	4	0	1	0	3	0	1	9

Sheet E	1	2	3	4	5	6	7	8	9	10	Final
Scotland (Wood) 🔨	0	1	0	1	0	0	1	0	3	0	6
Czech Republic (Synáčková)	1	0	2	0	2	2	0	1	0	1	9

===== Draw 5 =====
December 6th, 14:00

Sheet A	1	2	3	4	5	6	7	8	9	10	Final
Sweden (Norberg) 🔨	0	0	1	3	0	2	0	0	2	1	9
Germany (Jentsch)	1	1	0	0	2	0	0	0	0	0	4

Sheet B	1	2	3	4	5	6	7	8	9	10	Final
Switzerland (Ott) 🔨	0	1	1	0	0	2	3	0	0	1	8
Czech Republic (Synáčková)	0	0	0	1	1	0	0	2	1	0	5

Sheet C	1	2	3	4	5	6	7	8	9	10	Final
Russia (Jarkova) 🔨	2	0	2	0	0	0	0	1	0	0	5
Finland (Nykänen)	0	1	0	1	3	0	2	0	1	1	9

Sheet D	1	2	3	4	5	6	7	8	9	10	Final
Italy (Gaspari) 🔨	1	0	4	1	0	1	0	0	0	1	8
Scotland (Wood)	0	1	0	0	2	0	2	1	1	0	7

Sheet E	1	2	3	4	5	6	7	8	9	10	Final
Denmark (Dupont) 🔨	0	0	1	1	3	0	1	0	2	0	8
Norway (Nordby)	1	1	0	0	0	4	0	3	0	2	11

===== Draw 6 =====
December 7th, 8:00

Sheet A	1	2	3	4	5	6	7	8	9	10	Final
Denmark (Dupont) 🔨	0	0	2	0	0	1	0	1	X	X	4
Scotland (Wood)	1	3	0	1	1	0	2	0	X	X	8

Sheet B	1	2	3	4	5	6	7	8	9	10	Final
Norway (Nordby)	0	0	1	1	2	0	0	2	0	0	6
Finland (Nykänen) 🔨	1	2	0	0	0	2	0	0	3	1	9

Sheet C	1	2	3	4	5	6	7	8	9	10	Final
Czech Republic (Synáčková) 🔨	3	0	1	0	0	1	1	0	1	0	7
Italy (Gaspari)	0	3	0	2	2	0	0	3	0	1	11

Sheet D	1	2	3	4	5	6	7	8	9	10	Final
Switzerland (Ott) 🔨	1	0	2	0	1	0	1	0	0	0	6
Sweden (Norberg)	0	1	0	2	0	1	0	0	1	0	5

Sheet E	1	2	3	4	5	6	7	8	9	10	11	Final
Russia (Jarkova)	0	1	0	0	1	0	2	1	0	0	1	6
Germany (Jentsch) 🔨	0	0	0	2	0	0	0	0	2	1	0	5

===== Draw 7 =====
December 7th, 16:00

Sheet A	1	2	3	4	5	6	7	8	9	10	Final
Italy (Gaspari)	0	0	0	1	0	0	1	X	X	X	2
Norway (Nordby) 🔨	2	1	1	0	1	2	0	X	X	X	7

Sheet B	1	2	3	4	5	6	7	8	9	10	11	Final
Denmark (Dupont) 🔨	0	1	0	0	1	0	0	3	0	1	0	6
Russia (Jarkova)	0	0	0	2	0	2	1	0	1	0	1	7

Sheet C	1	2	3	4	5	6	7	8	9	10	Final
Scotland (Wood)	0	0	1	0	1	0	1	0	2	1	6
Switzerland (Ott) 🔨	1	1	0	1	0	1	0	1	0	0	5

Sheet D	1	2	3	4	5	6	7	8	9	10	Final
Germany (Jentsch)	0	1	0	2	0	1	1	1	0	0	6
Czech Republic (Synáčková) 🔨	1	0	4	0	4	0	0	0	1	3	13

Sheet E	1	2	3	4	5	6	7	8	9	10	Final
Finland (Nykänen) 🔨	0	1	0	0	2	1	0	0	0	0	4
Sweden (Norberg)	0	0	2	1	0	0	1	1	2	1	8

===== Draw 8 =====
December 8th, 9:00

Sheet A	1	2	3	4	5	6	7	8	9	10	Final
Czech Republic (Synáčková) 🔨	2	0	2	0	1	0	2	0	0	0	7
Finland (Nykänen)	0	0	0	2	0	1	0	1	2	2	8

Sheet B	1	2	3	4	5	6	7	8	9	10	Final
Scotland (Wood)	0	0	0	2	0	0	1	0	1	X	4
Germany (Jentsch) 🔨	2	2	1	0	1	1	0	1	0	X	8

Sheet C	1	2	3	4	5	6	7	8	9	10	Final
Denmark (Dupont)	0	3	0	1	0	2	0	1	X	X	7
Sweden (Norberg) 🔨	2	0	4	0	4	0	1	0	X	X	11

Sheet D	1	2	3	4	5	6	7	8	9	10	Final
Russia (Jarkova) 🔨	0	1	0	0	0	1	0	2	0	1	5
Italy (Gaspari)	0	0	1	0	1	0	1	0	1	0	4

Sheet E	1	2	3	4	5	6	7	8	9	10	11	12	Final
Norway (Nordby) 🔨	3	0	0	2	0	1	0	1	0	0	0	0	7
Switzerland (Ott)	0	1	1	0	1	0	1	0	2	1	0	2	9

===== Draw 9 =====
December 8th, 19:00

Sheet A	1	2	3	4	5	6	7	8	9	10	Final
Scotland (Wood) 🔨	0	1	1	0	0	1	0	0	2	1	6
Sweden (Norberg)	0	0	0	3	2	0	2	1	0	0	8

Sheet B	1	2	3	4	5	6	7	8	9	10	Final
Finland (Nykänen)	1	0	0	0	0	0	1	X	X	X	2
Italy (Gaspari) 🔨	0	1	1	2	2	2	0	X	X	X	8

Sheet C	1	2	3	4	5	6	7	8	9	10	Final
Germany (Jentsch)	0	2	2	0	3	0	0	0	1	1	9
Norway (Nordby) 🔨	1	0	0	3	0	3	1	2	0	0	10

Sheet D	1	2	3	4	5	6	7	8	9	10	Final
Denmark (Dupont) 🔨	0	1	0	1	2	0	3	0	1	1	9
Switzerland (Ott)	0	0	2	0	0	1	0	2	0	0	5

Sheet E	1	2	3	4	5	6	7	8	9	10	Final
Czech Republic (Synáčková)	0	1	0	1	1	0	1	0	0	X	4
Russia (Jarkova) 🔨	2	0	1	0	0	1	0	2	4	X	10

==== Tie-breaker ====
December 9th, 12:00

Sheet C	1	2	3	4	5	6	7	8	9	10	Final
Italy (Gaspari) 🔨	1	0	0	0	1	1	0	1	1	0	5
Scotland (Wood)	0	1	1	2	0	0	1	0	0	1	6

December 9th, 20:00

Sheet D	1	2	3	4	5	6	7	8	9	10	11	Final
Russia (Jarkova) 🔨	0	0	0	4	0	1	0	0	1	0	1	7
Scotland (Wood)	0	0	2	0	2	0	0	1	0	1	0	6

==== Playoffs ====
Semi-final
1	Switzerland	6
4	Russia	4
3	Sweden	5
2	Norway	3

Final
1	Switzerland	4
3	Sweden	9
Bronze medal
4	Russia	7
2	Norway	10

===== Semifinals =====
December 10th, 12:00

Sheet D	1	2	3	4	5	6	7	8	9	10	Final
Sweden (Norberg) 🔨	1	0	0	1	0	0	1	0	1	1	5
Norway (Nordby)	0	1	0	0	0	0	0	2	0	0	3

Sheet D	1	2	3	4	5	6	7	8	9	10	Final
Switzerland (Ott) 🔨	0	2	0	1	0	0	1	0	1	1	6
Russia (Jarkova)	0	0	0	0	1	1	0	2	0	0	4

===== Bronze-medal game =====
December 11th, 9:00

Sheet D	1	2	3	4	5	6	7	8	9	10	Final
Russia (Jarkova) 🔨	1	0	2	0	0	2	0	2	0	0	7
Norway (Nordby)	0	1	0	2	1	0	3	0	2	1	10

===== Gold-medal game =====
December 11th, 9:00

Sheet C	1	2	3	4	5	6	7	8	9	10	Final
Switzerland (Ott) 🔨	0	1	0	1	0	0	2	0	0	0	4
Sweden (Norberg)	2	0	1	0	0	2	0	1	0	3	9

==== Medals ====
Medal	Team
Gold	Sweden (Anette Norberg, Eva Lund, Cathrine Lindahl, Anna Bergström, and Ulrika Bergman)
Silver	Switzerland (Mirjam Ott, Binia Beeli, Brigitte Schori, Michèle Knobel, and Valeria Spälty)
Bronze	Norway (Dordi Nordby, Linn Githmark, Marianne Haslum, Camilla Holth, and Marianne Rørvik)
