= Brian Hansen (curler) =

Danish male curler

- Curler ♂
- Born: 26 January 1972 (age 54); Frederiksberg, Denmark

Team
- Curling club: Hvidovre CC, Hvidovre

Curling career
- Member Association: Denmark
- World Championship: 3 (1997, 1999, 2000)
- European Championship: 5 (1996, 1997, 1999, 2000, 2001)
- Olympic: 1 (2002)
Medal record
Curling
European Championships
Silver medal – second place	1997 Füssen
Silver medal – second place	1999 Chamonix
Silver medal – second place	2000 Oberstdorf
Danish Men's Championship
Gold medal – first place	1996
Gold medal – first place	1999
Gold medal – first place	2000

Alan Brian Christian Hansen (born 26 January 1972) is a Danish curler, a three-time European silver medallist and three-time Danish men's champion.

He participated at the 2002 Winter Olympics where the Danish men's team finished in seventh place.

== Teams ==
=== Men's ===
Season	Skip	Third	Second	Lead	Alternate	Coach	Events
1989–90	Claus Pørtner	Brian Hansen	Søren Mikkelsen				DJCC 1990 (gold)
1995–96	Ulrik Schmidt	Lasse Lavrsen	Ulrik Damm	Brian Hansen			DMCC 1996 (gold)
1996–97	Ulrik Schmidt	Lasse Lavrsen	Brian Hansen	Ulrik Damm	Carsten Svensgaard (WCC)	Frants Gufler (ECC); Bill Carey (WCC)	ECC 1996 (5th); WCC 1997 (6th)
1997–98	Ulrik Schmidt	Lasse Lavrsen	Brian Hansen	Carsten Svensgaard		Bill Carey	ECC 1997 (silver)
1998–99	Ulrik Schmidt	Lasse Lavrsen	Brian Hansen	Carsten Svensgaard	Frants Gufler	Bill Carey	DMCC 1999 (gold); WCC 1999 (6th)
1999–00	Ulrik Schmidt	Lasse Lavrsen	Brian Hansen	Carsten Svensgaard	Bo Jensen (ECC); Frants Gufler (DMCC, WCC)	Bill Carey	ECC 1999 (silver); DMCC 2000 (gold); WCC 2000 (5th)
2000–01	Ulrik Schmidt	Lasse Lavrsen	Brian Hansen	Carsten Svensgaard	Frants Gufler	Bill Carey	ECC 2000 (silver)
2001–02	Lasse Lavrsen	Brian Hansen	Carsten Svensgaard	Frants Gufler	Ulrik Schmidt	Bill Carey	ECC 2001 (6th)
2001–02	Ulrik Schmidt	Lasse Lavrsen	Brian Hansen	Carsten Svensgaard	Frants Gufler		WOG 2002 (7th)

=== Mixed ===
Season	Skip	Third	Second	Lead	Events
1996–97	Helena Blach Lavrsen	Lasse Lavrsen	Margit Pörtner	Brian Hansen	DMxCC 1997 (gold)
