= 1989 World Junior Curling Championships =

- Host city: Markham, Ontario, Canada
- Dates: March 19–25
- Men's winner: Sweden (3rd title)
- Skip: Peter Lindholm
- Third: Magnus Swartling
- Second: Owe Ljungdahl
- Lead: Peter Narup
- Alternate: Johan Hansson
- Finalist: Canada (Mike Wood)
- Women's winner: Canada (2nd title)
- Skip: LaDawn Funk
- Third: Sandy Symyrozum
- Second: Cindy Larsen
- Lead: Laurelle Funk
- Finalist: Norway (Trine Helgebostad)

The 1989 World Junior Curling Championships were held from March 19 to 25 in Markham, Ontario, Canada.

It was the first World Junior Championships to include teams from Italy.

== Men ==
=== Teams ===
Country	Skip	Third	Second	Lead	Alternate
Canada	Mike Wood	Mike Bradley	Todd Troyer	Greg Hawkes	
Denmark	Brian Benkjaer	Niels Polskjaer	Torben Schmidt	Allan Thomsen	
France	Christian Cossetto	Laurent Hue	Lionel Roux	Fabrice Tournier	
West Germany	Michael Frey	Bernhard Frey	Joachim Frey	Holger Schweizer	Max Kainz
Italy	Stefano Ferronato	Gianluca Lorenzi	Gian Paolo Zandegiacomo	Marco Alberti	
Norway	Thomas Ulsrud	Bent Ånund Ramsfjell	Krister Aanesen	Mads Rygg	
Scotland	Allan Manuel	Colin Galbraith	Andrew Finlay	Adrian Coutts	
Sweden	Peter Lindholm	Magnus Swartling	Owe Ljungdahl	Peter Narup	Johan Hansson
Switzerland	Markus Eggler	Marc Haudenschild	Frank Kobel	Reto Huber	Stefan Traub
United States	Kurt Marquardt	Jeff Falk	Dan Thurston	Mike Thurston	

=== Round Robin ===
Key
Teams to Playoffs
Teams to Tiebreaker for 4th place
Teams to Tiebreaker for 9th place

Place	Country	1	2	3	4	5	6	7	8	9	10	Wins	Losses
1	Sweden	*	8:2	6:4	6:4	5:3	10:5	5:3	7:4	8:1	13:2	9	0
2	Canada	2:8	*	5:3	4:3	8:6	6:2	7:3	4:3	6:5	8:4	8	1
3	Switzerland	4:6	3:5	*	5:3	5:6	5:3	6:3	7:2	8:1	9:3	6	3
4	Scotland	4:6	3:4	3:5	*	8:1	3:5	7:6	9:2	6:4	10:2	5	4
4	Norway	3:5	6:8	6:5	1:8	*	9:7	4:5	6:5	10:3	11:3	5	4
6	United States	5:10	2:6	3:5	5:3	7:9	*	9:2	6:7	8:7	9:1	4	5
7	West Germany	3:5	3:7	3:6	6:7	5:4	2:9	*	6:3	5:10	7:6	3	6
8	Italy	4:7	3:4	2:7	2:9	5:6	7:6	3:6	*	6:3	10:2	3	6
9	France	1:8	5:6	1:8	4:6	3:10	7:8	10:5	3:6	*	1:8	1	8
9	Denmark	2:13	4:8	3:9	2:10	3:11	1:9	6:7	2:10	8:1	*	1	8

==== Tiebreakers ====
For 4th place
Scotland	3
Norway	2

For 9th place
France	7
Denmark	6

=== Playoffs ===
Semifinals
1	Sweden	7
4	Scotland	4
2	Canada	5
3	Switzerland	4

Gold Medal Game
1	Sweden	7
2	Canada	2
Bronze Medal Game
4	Scotland	2
3	Switzerland	5

=== Rankings ===
Place	Country	Games	Wins	Losses
1st place, gold medalist(s)	Sweden	11	11	0
2nd place, silver medalist(s)	Canada	11	9	2
3rd place, bronze medalist(s)	Switzerland	11	7	4
4	Scotland	12	6	6
5	Norway	10	5	5
6	United States	9	4	5
7	West Germany	9	3	6
8	Italy	9	3	6
9	France	10	2	8
10	Denmark	10	1	9

== Women ==
=== Teams ===
Country	Skip	Third	Second	Lead	Alternate
Canada	LaDawn Funk	Sandy Symyrozum	Cindy Larsen	Laurelle Funk	
Denmark	June Simonsen	Dorthe Holm	Dorthe Andersen	Angelina Jensen	
France	Karine Caux	Laurence Bibollet	Chrystelle Fournier	Véronique Girod	Géraldine Girod
West Germany	Simone Vogel	Christina Haller	Heike Wieländer	Sabine Belkofer	Michaela Greif
Italy	Daniela Zandegiacomo	Carla Zandegiacomo	Giulia Lacedelli	Rossela Carrara	
Norway	Trine Helgebostad	Cathrine Ulrichsen	Cecilie Torhaug	Darcie Skjerpen	
Scotland	Carolyn Hutchison	Julie Hepburn	Katie Loudon	Julia Halliday	
Sweden	Cathrine Norberg	Mari Högqvist	Helene Granqvist	Annica Eklund	Helena Klange
Switzerland	Diana Meichtry	Araxi Karnusian	Graziella Grichting	Jacqueline Loretan	Helga Oswald
United States	Erika Brown	Tracy Zeman	Shellie Holerud	Jill Jones	Debbie Henry

=== Round Robin ===
Key
Teams to Playoffs
Teams to Tiebreaker for 4th place

Place	Country	1	2	3	4	5	6	7	8	9	10	Wins	Losses
1	Canada	*	6:1	0:9	4:2	4:2	6:2	6:4	6:4	12:1	9:1	8	1
2	Sweden	1:6	*	10:4	5:4	4:8	4:2	8:4	7:3	8:4	11:2	7	2
3	Norway	9:0	4:10	*	5:6	8:4	8:7	8:3	12:7	5:3	12:2	7	2
4	Scotland	2:4	4:5	6:5	*	6:5	8:3	3:7	8:5	8:4	11:2	6	3
4	Switzerland	2:4	8:4	4:8	5:6	*	6:5	5:4	10:2	10:2	7:0	6	3
6	United States	2:6	2:4	7:8	3:8	5:6	*	6:5	8:2	8:1	16:0	4	5
7	West Germany	4:6	4:8	3:8	7:3	4:5	5:6	*	8:6	5:3	17:1	4	5
8	France	4:6	3:7	7:12	5:8	2:10	2:8	6:8	*	12:4	5:3	2	7
9	Denmark	1:12	4:8	3:5	4:8	2:10	1:8	3:5	4:12	*	10:9	1	8
10	Italy	1:9	2:11	2:12	2:11	0:7	0:16	1:17	3:5	9:10	*	0	9

==== Tiebreaker ====
For 4th place
Scotland	5
Switzerland	4

=== Playoffs ===
Semifinals
1	Canada	4
4	Scotland	3
2	Sweden	3
3	Norway	5

Gold Medal Game
1	Canada	10
2	Norway	3
Bronze Medal Game
4	Scotland	5
2	Sweden	4

=== Rankings ===
Place	Country	Games	Wins	Losses
1st place, gold medalist(s)	Canada	11	10	1
2nd place, silver medalist(s)	Norway	11	8	3
3rd place, bronze medalist(s)	Scotland	12	8	4
4	Sweden	11	7	4
5	Switzerland	10	6	4
6	United States	9	4	5
7	West Germany	9	4	5
8	France	9	2	7
9	Denmark	9	1	8
10	Italy	9	0	9

== Awards ==
WJCC All-Star Team:

	Skip	Third	Second	Lead
Men	(Sweden) Peter Lindholm	(Switzerland) Marc Haudenschild	(Sweden) Owe Ljungdahl	(Canada) Greg Hawkes
Women	(Canada) LaDawn Funk	(Canada) Sandy Symyrozum	(Switzerland) Graziella Grichting	(Sweden) Annica Eklund

WJCC Sportsmanship Award:

Men	(Denmark) Brian Benkjaer
Women	(Canada) Sandy Symyrozum

== Sources ==
- Men's results from the World Curling Federation
- Women's results from the World Curling Federation
