= Ken Tralnberg =

Canadian curler

- Curler
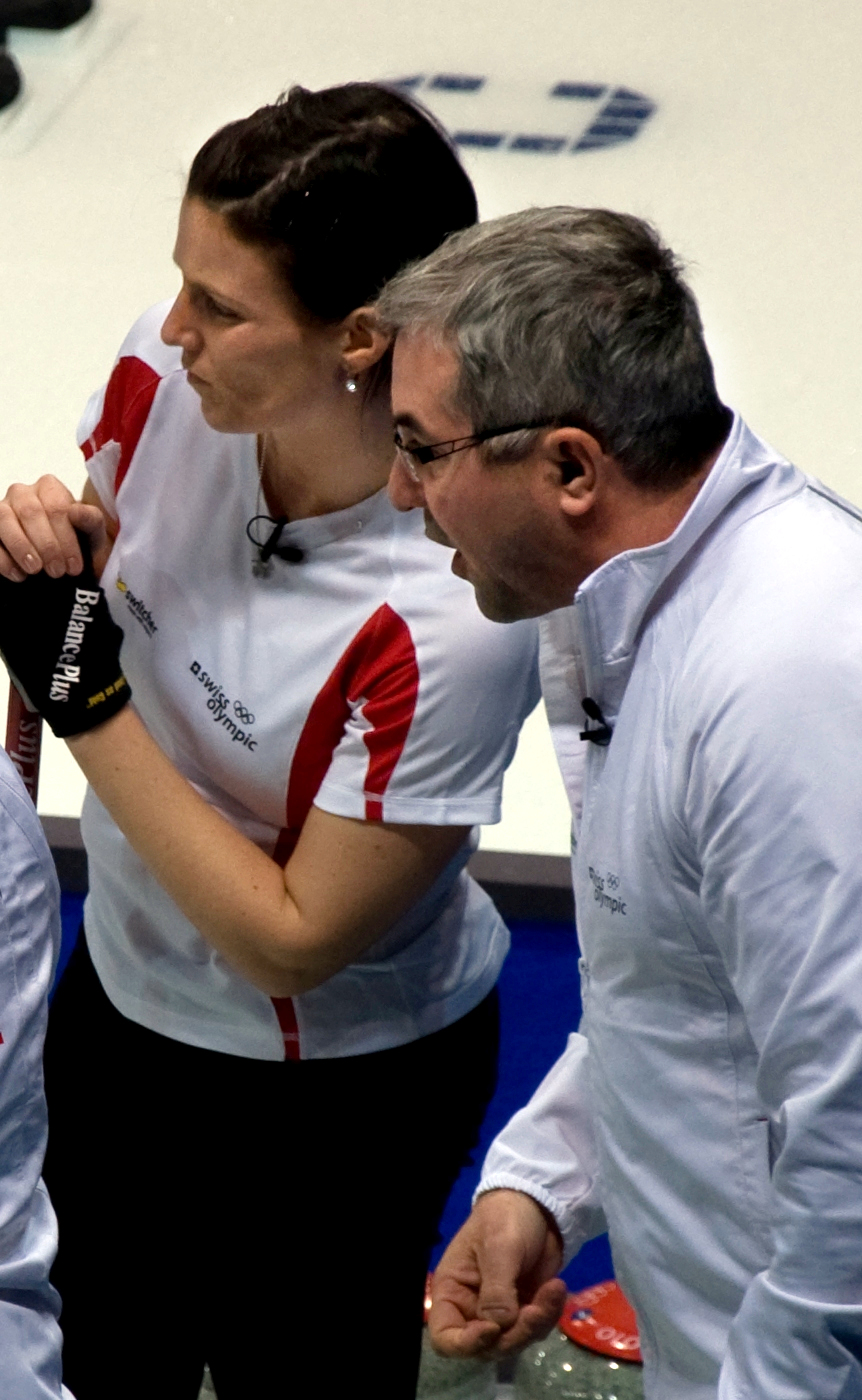
- Born: July 17, 1956 (age 70); Prince Albert, Saskatchewan

Curling career
- Olympic: 1 (2002)
Medal record
Men's Curling
Representing Canada
Olympic Games
Silver medal – second place	2002 Salt Lake City	Team

Kenneth Tralnberg (born July 17, 1956, in Prince Albert, Saskatchewan) is a Canadian curler and Olympic medallist. He received a silver medal at the 2002 Winter Olympics in Salt Lake City. He lives in St. Albert, Alberta.

He was the coach for the Swiss Women's Curling team at the 2010 Winter Olympics in Vancouver as well as their coach at the 2014 Winter Olympics in Sochi.
