= Curling at the 2002 Winter Olympics =

Curling at the XIX Olympic Winter Games
- Venue: The Ice Sheet at Ogden
- Dates: February 11–22, 2002
- Competitors: 100 from 12 nations

Men's curling at the XIX Olympic Winter Games

Medalists
1st place, gold medalist(s)		Norway
2nd place, silver medalist(s)		Canada
3rd place, bronze medalist(s)		Switzerland

Women's curling at the XIX Olympic Winter Games

Medalists
1st place, gold medalist(s)		Great Britain
2nd place, silver medalist(s)		Switzerland
3rd place, bronze medalist(s)		Canada

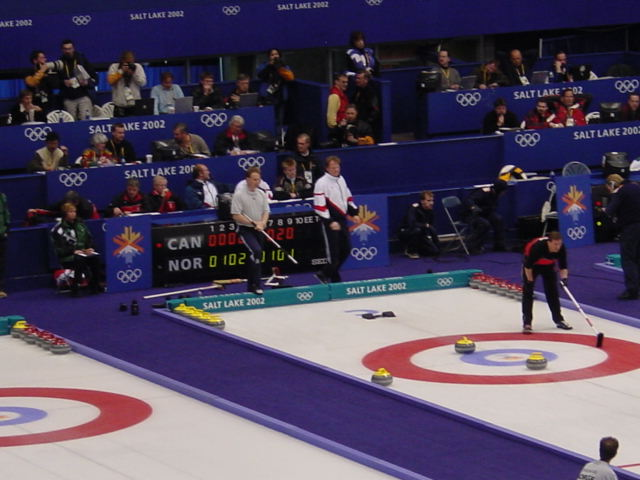
Curling at The Ice Sheet at Ogden.

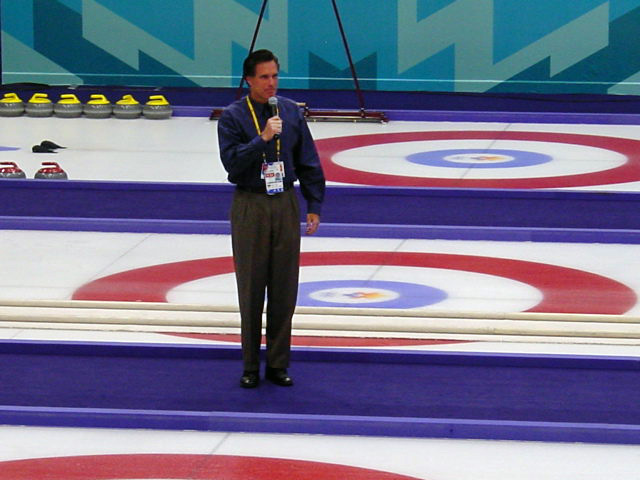
Mitt Romney, CEO of the Salt Lake Organizing Committee, offers remarks before a curling event.

Curling at the 2002 Winter Olympics took place from February 11 to February 18 in Ogden, Utah. The 2002 Winter Games were the third time that curling was on the Olympic program.

== Men's ==
=== Men's tournament ===
Medal	Team
Gold	Norway (Pål Trulsen, Lars Vågberg, Flemming Davanger, Bent Ånund Ramsfjell, Torger Nergård)
Silver	Canada (Kevin Martin, Don Walchuk, Carter Rycroft, Don Bartlett, Ken Tralnberg)
Bronze	Switzerland (Andreas Schwaller, Christof Schwaller, Markus Eggler, Damian Grichting, Marco Ramstein)

=== Teams ===
Canada	Denmark	Finland	France	Germany
Ottewell CC, Edmonton Skip: Kevin Martin; Third: Don Walchuk; Second: Carter Rycroft; Lead: Don Bartlett; Alternate: Ken Tralnberg	Hvidovre CC, Hvidovre Skip: Ulrik Schmidt; Third: Lasse Lavrsen; Second: Brian Hansen; Lead: Carsten Svensgaard; Alternate: Frants Gufler	Oulunkylä CC, Helsinki Skip: Markku Uusipaavalniemi; Third: Wille Mäkelä; Second: Tommi Häti; Lead: Jari Laukkanen; Alternate: Pekka Saarelainen	Chamonix CC, Chamonix Skip: Dominique Dupont-Roc; Third: Jan Ducroz; Second: Thomas Dufour; Lead: Spencer Mugnier; Alternate: Philippe Caux	EC Oberstdorf, Oberstdorf Skip: Sebastian Stock; Third: Daniel Herberg; Second: Stephan Knoll; Lead: Markus Messenzehl; Alternate: Patrick Hoffman
Great Britain	Norway	Sweden	Switzerland	United States
Stranraer CC, Stranraer Skip: Hammy McMillan*; Third: Warwick Smith; Second: Ewan MacDonald; Lead: Peter Loudon; Alternate: Norman Brown	Stabekk CC, Oslo Skip: Pål Trulsen; Third: Lars Vågberg; Second: Flemming Davanger; Lead: Bent Ånund Ramsfjell; Alternate: Torger Nergård	Östersunds CK, Östersund Skip: Peja Lindholm; Third: Tomas Nordin; Second: Magnus Swartling; Lead: Peter Narup; Alternate: Anders Kraupp	Biel-Touring CC, Biel Skip: Andreas Schwaller; Third: Christof Schwaller; Second: Markus Eggler; Lead: Damian Grichting; Alternate: Marco Ramstein	Superior CC, Superior Skip: Tim Somerville; Third: Mike Schneeberger; Second: Myles Brundidge; Lead: John Gordon; Alternate: Donald Barcome Jr.

* Hammy McMillan was replaced by Warwick Smith as skip after Draw 4.

=== Round-robin standings ===
Nation	Skip	W	L	Qualification
Canada	Kevin Martin	8	1	Playoffs
Norway	Pål Trulsen	7	2	Playoffs
Switzerland	Andreas Schwaller	6	3	Playoffs
Sweden	Peja Lindholm	6	3	Playoffs
Finland	Markku Uusipaavalniemi	5	4	
Germany	Sebastian Stock	4	5	
Denmark	Ulrik Schmidt	3	6	
(United Kingdom) Great Britain	Hammy McMillan	3	6	
United States	Tim Somerville	3	6	
France	Dominique Dupont-Roc	0	9	

=== Draws ===
==== Draw 1 ====
February 11, 9:00

Sheet A	1	2	3	4	5	6	7	8	9	10	Final
Denmark (Schmidt)	0	0	1	0	0	1	0	1	X	X	3
Finland (Uusipaavalniemi) 🔨	2	2	0	2	2	0	1	0	X	X	9

Sheet B	1	2	3	4	5	6	7	8	9	10	Final
France (Dupont-Rus) 🔨	0	1	0	2	0	0	0	2	0	X	5
Germany (Stock)	0	0	1	0	2	2	1	0	3	X	9

Sheet C	1	2	3	4	5	6	7	8	9	10	Final
United States (Somerville) 🔨	2	1	0	0	1	0	4	0	2	X	10
Sweden (Lindholm)	0	0	1	1	0	1	0	2	0	X	5

Sheet D	1	2	3	4	5	6	7	8	9	10	Final
Canada (Martin) 🔨	0	2	1	0	1	0	2	0	0	0	6
Great Britain (McMillan)	0	0	0	1	0	1	0	2	0	0	4

==== Draw 2 ====
February 11, 19:00

Sheet A	1	2	3	4	5	6	7	8	9	10	Final
Norway (Trulsen)	0	0	0	1	0	0	1	1	1	0	4
Switzerland (Schwaller) 🔨	0	0	1	0	2	1	0	0	0	1	5

Sheet B	1	2	3	4	5	6	7	8	9	10	Final
United States (Somerville) 🔨	0	1	0	0	0	0	2	0	0	X	3
Canada (Martin)	1	0	3	0	1	1	0	1	1	X	8

Sheet C	1	2	3	4	5	6	7	8	9	10	11	Final
Denmark (Schmidt) 🔨	1	0	0	1	0	2	1	0	0	2	1	8
France (Dupont-Roc)	0	1	1	0	2	0	0	2	1	0	0	7

Sheet D	1	2	3	4	5	6	7	8	9	10	Final
Finland (Uusipaavalniemi) 🔨	1	2	0	2	0	0	0	0	1	0	6
Germany (Stock)	0	0	2	0	0	1	2	1	0	1	7

==== Draw 3 ====
February 12, 14:00

Sheet A	1	2	3	4	5	6	7	8	9	10	Final
Sweden (Lindholm) 🔨	0	0	1	0	0	0	2	0	3	1	7
Great Britain (McMillan)	0	0	0	0	0	1	0	1	0	0	2

Sheet B	1	2	3	4	5	6	7	8	9	10	Final
Denmark (Schmidt)	0	0	0	2	0	0	1	3	0	0	6
Switzerland (Schwaller) 🔨	0	1	2	0	1	2	0	0	2	2	10

Sheet C	1	2	3	4	5	6	7	8	9	10	Final
Finland (Uusipaavalniemi)	0	2	0	0	0	2	X	X	X	X	4
Canada (Martin) 🔨	2	0	3	2	2	0	X	X	X	X	9

Sheet D	1	2	3	4	5	6	7	8	9	10	Final
France (Dupont-Roc) 🔨	0	0	0	0	0	1	1	0	0	X	2
Norway (Trulsen)	1	0	0	2	3	0	0	1	2	X	9

==== Draw 4 ====
February 13, 9:00

Sheet A	1	2	3	4	5	6	7	8	9	10	11	Final
Switzerland (Schwaller)	0	0	1	0	2	0	0	1	0	1	0	5
Finland (Uusipaavalniemi) 🔨	0	0	0	2	0	2	0	0	1	0	1	6

Sheet B	1	2	3	4	5	6	7	8	9	10	11	Final
Great Britain (McMillan) 🔨	1	0	0	0	0	0	2	0	2	1	0	6
Norway (Trulsen)	0	1	0	0	1	0	0	4	0	0	1	7

Sheet C	1	2	3	4	5	6	7	8	9	10	11	Final
Germany (Stock) 🔨	2	0	0	2	0	2	0	1	0	1	1	9
United States (Somerville)	0	0	2	0	1	0	3	0	2	0	0	8

Sheet D	1	2	3	4	5	6	7	8	9	10	Final
Denmark (Schmidt) 🔨	2	0	0	1	0	1	0	0	1	0	5
Sweden (Lindholm)	0	1	2	0	1	0	2	2	0	1	9

==== Draw 5 ====
February 13, 19:00

Sheet A	1	2	3	4	5	6	7	8	9	10	Final
Great Britain (Smith)	0	2	1	1	0	3	0	0	0	0	7
Germany (Stock) 🔨	3	0	0	0	2	0	1	0	0	0	6

Sheet B	1	2	3	4	5	6	7	8	9	10	Final
Canada (Martin)	1	1	3	0	1	2	X	X	X	X	8
France (Dupont-Roc) 🔨	0	0	0	1	0	0	X	X	X	X	1

Sheet C	1	2	3	4	5	6	7	8	9	10	Final
Sweden (Lindholm) 🔨	0	1	0	2	0	0	3	0	1	0	7
Switzerland (Schwaller)	1	0	1	0	2	1	0	1	0	2	8

Sheet D	1	2	3	4	5	6	7	8	9	10	Final
Norway (Trulsen) 🔨	1	0	0	1	1	0	1	0	0	2	6
United States (Somerville)	0	1	1	0	0	1	0	1	1	0	5

==== Draw 6 ====
February 14, 14:00

Sheet A	1	2	3	4	5	6	7	8	9	10	11	Final
Canada (Martin) 🔨	2	0	0	0	1	0	1	0	0	1	0	5
Sweden (Lindholm)	0	2	0	0	0	1	0	2	0	0	1	6

Sheet B	1	2	3	4	5	6	7	8	9	10	Final
Switzerland (Schwaller)	0	0	0	0	0	1	0	1	0	X	2
United States (Somerville) 🔨	0	0	0	2	2	0	1	0	1	X	6

Sheet C	1	2	3	4	5	6	7	8	9	10	11	Final
Denmark (Schmidt) 🔨	1	0	0	2	0	0	2	0	0	1	0	6
Germany (Stock)	0	0	1	0	2	1	0	2	0	0	1	7

Sheet D	1	2	3	4	5	6	7	8	9	10	11	Final
Finland (Uusipaavalniemi) 🔨	1	0	2	1	0	0	1	0	0	0	1	6
France (Dupont-Roc)	0	2	0	0	1	0	0	0	0	2	0	5

==== Draw 7 ====
February 15, 9:00

Sheet A	1	2	3	4	5	6	7	8	9	10	Final
France (Dupont-Roc) 🔨	1	0	0	1	0	0	0	1	0	X	3
United States (Somerville)	0	0	2	0	0	2	1	0	3	X	8

Sheet B	1	2	3	4	5	6	7	8	9	10	Final
Norway (Trulsen) 🔨	2	0	2	0	2	0	1	0	1	1	9
Denmark (Schmidt)	0	1	0	0	0	2	0	1	0	0	4

Sheet C	1	2	3	4	5	6	7	8	9	10	Final
Great Britain (Smith) 🔨	1	0	0	0	2	0	0	1	0	0	4
Finland (Uusipaavalniemi)	0	1	0	1	0	1	0	0	0	3	6

Sheet D	1	2	3	4	5	6	7	8	9	10	Final
Germany (Stock) 🔨	0	1	0	1	0	1	1	0	2	1	7
Canada (Martin)	2	0	3	0	2	0	0	2	0	0	9

==== Draw 8 ====
February 15, 19:00

Sheet A	1	2	3	4	5	6	7	8	9	10	Final
Finland (Uusipaavalniemi)	0	0	0	1	0	1	0	1	2	0	5
Norway (Trulsen) 🔨	0	0	2	0	2	0	1	0	0	1	6

Sheet B	1	2	3	4	5	6	7	8	9	10	Final
Canada (Martin)	0	1	0	1	1	1	2	1	X	X	7
Switzerland (Schwaller) 🔨	1	0	1	0	0	0	0	0	X	X	2

Sheet C	1	2	3	4	5	6	7	8	9	10	Final
France (Dupont-Roc)	0	0	1	0	2	0	2	0	1	0	6
Sweden (Lindholm) 🔨	0	4	0	2	0	2	0	0	0	1	9

Sheet D	1	2	3	4	5	6	7	8	9	10	Final
Great Britain (Smith) 🔨	2	0	1	0	1	0	0	0	1	0	5
Denmark (Schmidt)	0	0	0	2	0	0	0	3	0	1	6

==== Draw 9 ====
February 16, 14:00

Sheet A	1	2	3	4	5	6	7	8	9	10	Final
Switzerland (Schwaller) 🔨	1	1	1	0	1	0	2	0	4	X	10
Great Britain (Smith)	0	0	0	1	0	1	0	2	0	X	4

Sheet B	1	2	3	4	5	6	7	8	9	10	Final
Finland (Uusipaavalniemi) 🔨	0	0	2	0	2	0	X	X	X	X	4
Sweden (Lindholm)	4	1	0	6	0	0	X	X	X	X	11

Sheet C	1	2	3	4	5	6	7	8	9	10	11	Final
United States (Somerville)	0	2	0	2	0	1	0	1	0	1	0	7
Denmark (Schmidt) 🔨	2	0	1	0	1	0	2	0	1	0	2	9

Sheet D	1	2	3	4	5	6	7	8	9	10	Final
Norway (Trulsen)	0	2	0	2	0	0	3	1	1	1	10
Germany (Stock) 🔨	1	0	1	0	2	1	0	0	0	0	5

==== Draw 10 ====
February 17, 9:00

Sheet A	1	2	3	4	5	6	7	8	9	10	11	Final
Germany (Herberg)	0	0	1	1	0	0	1	0	0	1	0	4
Sweden (Lindholm) 🔨	0	1	0	0	1	0	0	1	1	0	1	5

Sheet C	1	2	3	4	5	6	7	8	9	10	Final
Canada (Martin) 🔨	3	1	1	0	3	0	1	0	X	X	9
Norway (Trulsen)	0	0	0	1	0	2	0	1	X	X	4

Sheet D	1	2	3	4	5	6	7	8	9	10	Final
France (Dupont-Roc) 🔨	0	0	0	1	0	1	0	1	0	0	3
Switzerland (Schwaller)	0	1	0	0	1	0	1	0	2	2	7

==== Draw 11 ====
February 17, 19:00

Sheet B	1	2	3	4	5	6	7	8	9	10	Final
France (Dupont-Roc)	0	0	2	0	0	0	0	1	0	0	3
Great Britain (Smith) 🔨	2	0	0	1	0	0	2	0	1	1	7

Sheet D	1	2	3	4	5	6	7	8	9	10	Final
United States (Somerville) 🔨	0	1	0	1	0	0	0	1	1	0	4
Finland (Uusipaavalniemi)	0	0	2	0	1	1	1	0	0	1	6

==== Draw 12 ====
February 18, 14:00

Sheet A	1	2	3	4	5	6	7	8	9	10	Final
Denmark (Schmidt)	1	0	0	1	0	0	0	1	0	X	3
Canada (Martin) 🔨	0	1	0	0	1	1	2	0	3	X	8

Sheet B	1	2	3	4	5	6	7	8	9	10	Final
Germany (Stock)	0	0	1	0	1	0	1	0	1	0	4
Switzerland (Schwaller) 🔨	0	4	0	1	0	2	0	1	0	2	10

Sheet C	1	2	3	4	5	6	7	8	9	10	Final
Great Britain (Smith)	0	2	2	0	1	0	0	1	0	1	7
United States (Somerville) 🔨	1	0	0	1	0	1	1	0	2	0	6

Sheet D	1	2	3	4	5	6	7	8	9	10	11	Final
Sweden (Lindholm)	0	0	2	0	2	0	2	1	0	1	0	8
Norway (Trulsen) 🔨	0	2	0	2	0	1	0	0	3	0	1	9

=== Medal round ===
Semifinal
1	Canada	6
4	Sweden	4
3	Switzerland	6
2	Norway	7

Final
1	Canada	5
2	Norway	6
Bronze medal
4	Sweden	3
3	Switzerland	7

=== Semifinals ===
February 20, 14:00

Sheet B	1	2	3	4	5	6	7	8	9	10	Final
Sweden (Lindholm)	0	2	0	0	1	0	1	0	0	0	4
Canada (Martin) 🔨	3	0	0	1	0	1	0	1	0	0	6

Player Percentages
Sweden		Canada	
Peter Narup	93%	Don Bartlett	91%
Magnus Swartling	78%	Carter Rycroft	91%
Tomas Nordin	84%	Don Walchuk	85%
Peja Lindholm	84%	Kevin Martin	84%
Total	85%	Total	88%

Sheet D	1	2	3	4	5	6	7	8	9	10	11	Final
Norway (Trulsen) 🔨	0	0	1	0	1	0	1	0	2	1	1	7
Switzerland (Schwaller)	0	1	0	3	0	1	0	1	0	0	0	6

Player Percentages
Norway		Switzerland	
Bent Ånund Ramsfjell	91%	Damian Grichting	74%
Flemming Davanger	66%	Markus Eggler	83%
Lars Vågberg	76%	Christof Schwaller	84%
Pål Trulsen	80%	Andreas Schwaller	75%
Total	78%	Total	79%

=== Bronze medal game ===
February 21, 9:00

Sheet C	1	2	3	4	5	6	7	8	9	10	Final
Sweden (Lindholm)	0	0	2	0	1	0	0	0	0	X	3
Switzerland (Schwaller) 🔨	1	2	0	1	0	0	2	1	0	X	7

Player Percentages
Sweden		Switzerland	
Peter Narup	90%	Damian Grichting	69%
Magnus Swartling	85%	Markus Eggler	86%
Tomas Nordin	65%	Christof Schwaller	92%
Peja Lindholm	53%	Andreas Schwaller	85%
Total	73%	Total	83%

=== Gold medal game ===
February 22, 14:30

Sheet C	1	2	3	4	5	6	7	8	9	10	Final
Canada (Martin) 🔨	0	0	0	0	2	1	0	2	0	0	5
Norway (Trulsen)	0	1	0	2	0	0	1	0	1	1	6

Player Percentages
Canada		Norway	
Don Bartlett	76%	Bent Ånund Ramsfjell	71%
Carter Rycroft	64%	Flemming Davanger	78%
Don Walchuk	64%	Lars Vågberg	69%
Kevin Martin	68%	Pål Trulsen	60%
Total	68%	Total	69%

=== Final standings ===
Rank	Country	Skip	W	L
1st place, gold medalist(s)	Norway	Pål Trulsen	9	2
2nd place, silver medalist(s)	Canada	Kevin Martin	9	2
3rd place, bronze medalist(s)	Switzerland	Andreas Schwaller	7	4
4	Sweden	Peja Lindholm	6	5
5	Finland	Markku Uusipaavalniemi	5	4
6	Germany	Sebastian Stock	4	5
7	Denmark	Ulrik Schmidt	3	6
8	(United Kingdom) Great Britain	Hammy McMillan	3	6
9	United States	Tim Somerville	3	6
10	France	Dominique Dupont-Roc	0	9

=== Top 5 player percentages ===
Leads	%	Seconds	%	Thirds	%	Skips	%
(United Kingdom) Peter Loudon	85	(Canada) Carter Rycroft	88	(Canada) Don Walchuk	79	(Canada) Kevin Martin	85
(Finland) Jari Laukkanen	85	(Switzerland) Markus Eggler	79	(Norway) Lars Vågberg	78	(Norway) Pål Trulsen	78
(United States) John Gordon	81	(United Kingdom) Ewan MacDonald	79	(Finland) Wille Mäkelä	77	(Sweden) Peja Lindholm	77
(Norway) Bent Ånund Ramsfjell	79	(Finland) Tommi Häti	77	(Switzerland) Christof Schwaller	77	(Switzerland) Andreas Schwaller	77
(Denmark) Carsten Svensgaard	79	(Norway) Flemming Davanger	76	(United Kingdom) Warwick Smith	74	(United Kingdom) Hammy McMillan	76
		(United States) Myles Brundidge	76				

== Women's ==
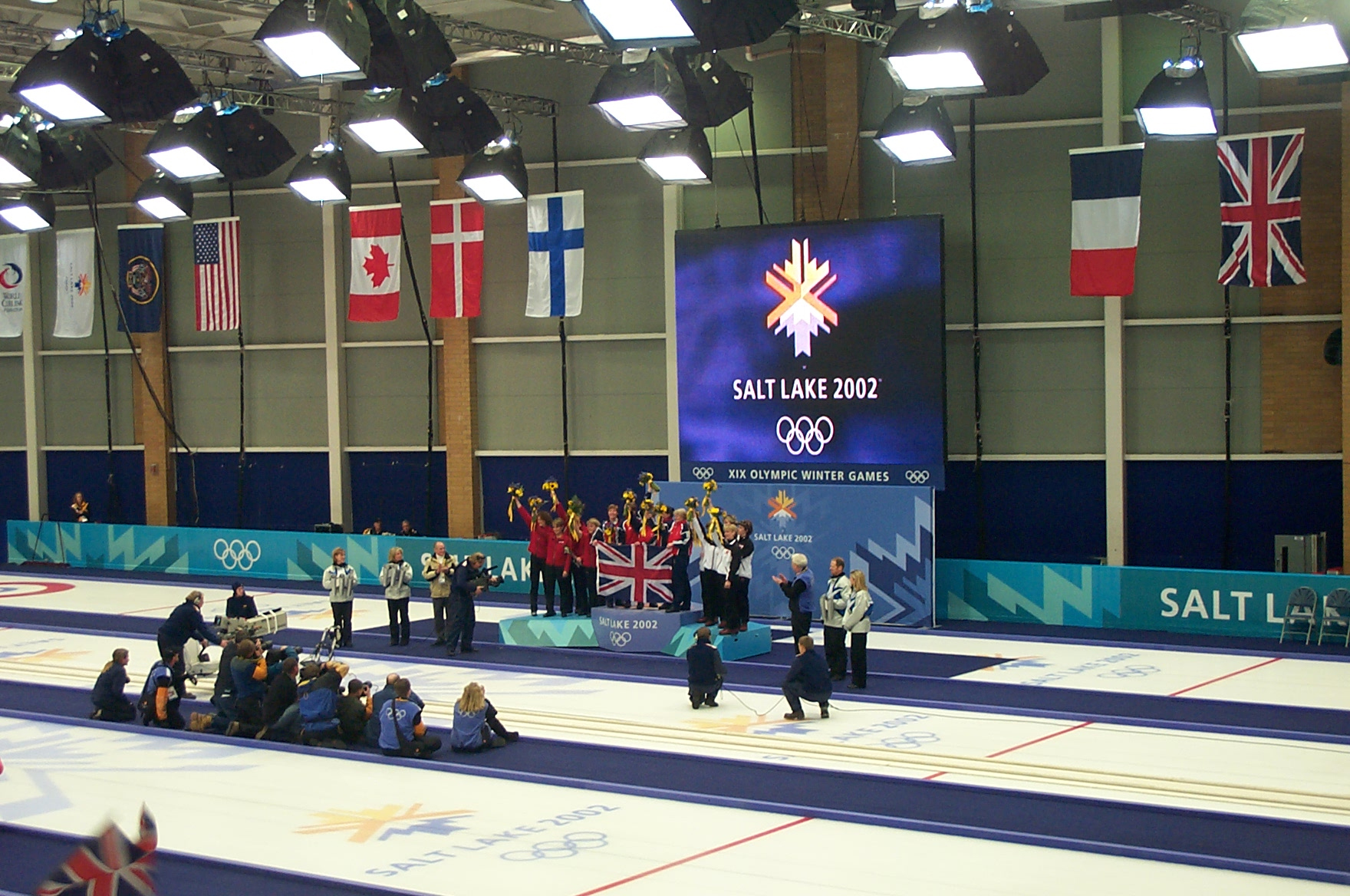
The Olympic medalists of the Curling Women's event

=== Women's tournament ===
Medal	Team
Gold	Great Britain (Rhona Martin, Deborah Knox, Fiona MacDonald, Janice Rankin, Margaret Morton)
Silver	Switzerland (Luzia Ebnöther, Mirjam Ott, Tanya Frei, Laurence Bidaud, Nadia Röthlisberger)
Bronze	Canada (Kelley Law, Julie Skinner, Georgina Wheatcroft, Diane Nelson, Cheryl Noble)

=== Teams ===
Canada	Denmark	Germany	Great Britain	Japan
Richmond WC, Richmond, BC Skip: Kelley Law; Third: Julie Skinner; Second: Georgina Wheatcroft; Lead: Diane Nelson; Alternate: Cheryl Noble	Hvidovre CC, Hvidovre Skip: Lene Bidstrup; Third: Susanne Slotsager; Second: Malene Krause; Lead: Avijaja Lund Nielsen; Alternate: Lisa Richardson	SC Riessersee, Garmisch-Partenkirchen Skip: Natalie Neßler; Third: Sabine Belkofer; Second: Heike Wieländer; Lead: Andrea Stock; Alternate: Karin Fischer	Greenacres CC, Howwood Skip: Rhona Martin; Third: Deborah Knox; Second: Fiona MacDonald; Lead: Janice Rankin; Alternate: Margaret Morton	Simsons CC, Kitami Skip: Akiko Katoh; Third: Yumie Hayashi; Second: Ayumi Onodera; Lead: Mika Konaka; Alternate: Kotomi Ishizaki
Norway	Russia	Sweden	Switzerland	United States
Snarøen CC, Oslo Skip: Dordi Nordby; Third: Hanne Woods; Second: Marianne Haslum; Lead: Camilla Holth; Alternate: Kristin Løvseth	Moskvitch CC, Moscow Skip: Olga Jarkova; Third: Nkeiruka Ezekh; Second: Yana Nekrasova; Lead: Anastassia Skoultan; Alternate: Angela Tuvaeva	Umeå CC, Umeå Skip: Elisabet Gustafson; Third: Katarina Nyberg; Second: Louise Marmont; Lead: Elisabeth Persson; Alternate: Christina Bertrup	CC Bern AAM, Bern Skip: Luzia Ebnöther; Third: Mirjam Ott; Second: Tanya Frei; Lead: Laurence Bidaud; Alternate: Nadia Röthlisberger	Bemidji CC, Bemidji Skip: Kari Erickson; Third: Debbie McCormick; Second: Stacey Liapis; Lead: Ann Swisshelm; Alternate: Joni Cotten

=== Round-robin standings ===
Nation	Skip	W	L	Qualification
Canada	Kelley Law	8	1	Playoffs
Switzerland	Luzia Ebnöther	7	2	Playoffs
United States	Kari Erickson	6	3	Playoffs
Germany	Natalie Neßler	5	4	Tiebreaker
Sweden	Elisabet Gustafson	5	4	Tiebreaker
(United Kingdom) Great Britain	Rhona Martin	5	4	Tiebreaker
Norway	Dordi Nordby	4	5	
Japan	Akiko Katoh	2	7	
Denmark	Lene Bidstrup	2	7	
Russia	Olga Jarkova	1	8	

=== Draws ===
==== Draw 1 ====
February 11, 14:00

Sheet A	1	2	3	4	5	6	7	8	9	10	Final
Sweden (Gustafson)	0	0	0	0	0	1	0	0	2	1	4
Canada (Law) 🔨	0	0	0	0	4	0	1	0	0	0	5

Sheet B	1	2	3	4	5	6	7	8	9	10	Final
Great Britain (Martin) 🔨	1	0	0	2	0	2	0	2	3	0	10
Norway (Nordby)	0	1	1	0	2	0	1	0	0	1	6

Sheet C	1	2	3	4	5	6	7	8	9	10	11	Final
Switzerland (Ebnöther) 🔨	0	1	1	0	4	0	2	0	0	0	1	9
Denmark (Bidstrup)	1	0	0	2	0	1	0	2	1	1	0	8

Sheet D	1	2	3	4	5	6	7	8	9	10	Final
Russia (Jarkova) 🔨	0	1	1	0	0	1	0	0	2	0	5
Germany (Neßler)	1	0	0	1	1	0	0	1	0	4	8

==== Draw 2 ====
February 12, 9:00

Sheet A	1	2	3	4	5	6	7	8	9	10	Final
Japan (Katoh) 🔨	0	1	0	2	3	0	0	0	1	0	7
United States (Erickson)	0	0	1	0	0	3	1	1	0	2	8

Sheet B	1	2	3	4	5	6	7	8	9	10	11	12	Final
Switzerland (Ebnöther) 🔨	1	0	0	0	2	0	0	2	0	1	0	1	7
Russia (Jarkova)	0	0	2	0	0	0	1	0	3	0	0	0	6

Sheet C	1	2	3	4	5	6	7	8	9	10	Final
Sweden (Gustafson) 🔨	0	1	1	0	1	0	1	0	2	1	7
Great Britain (Martin)	0	0	0	2	0	1	0	1	0	0	4

Sheet D	1	2	3	4	5	6	7	8	9	10	Final
Canada (Law) 🔨	0	1	1	0	3	0	1	0	0	0	6
Norway (Nordby)	1	0	0	1	0	1	0	1	1	0	5

==== Draw 3 ====
February 12, 19:00

Sheet A	1	2	3	4	5	6	7	8	9	10	Final
Denmark (Bidstrup) 🔨	2	0	0	1	0	1	0	1	0	0	5
Germany (Neßler)	0	0	3	0	1	0	2	0	2	1	9

Sheet B	1	2	3	4	5	6	7	8	9	10	Final
Sweden (Gustafson)	0	1	0	1	0	0	2	0	1	0	5
United States (Erickson) 🔨	1	0	2	0	1	1	0	0	0	1	6

Sheet C	1	2	3	4	5	6	7	8	9	10	Final
Canada (Law)	0	0	0	1	1	0	3	0	2	0	7
Russia (Jarkova) 🔨	0	0	1	0	0	1	0	2	0	2	6

Sheet D	1	2	3	4	5	6	7	8	9	10	Final
Great Britain (Martin) 🔨	2	1	0	2	1	2	1	X	X	X	9
Japan (Katoh)	0	0	1	0	0	0	0	X	X	X	1

==== Draw 4 ====
February 13, 14:00

Sheet A	1	2	3	4	5	6	7	8	9	10	Final
United States (Erickson)	0	0	0	1	0	1	1	1	0	0	4
Canada (Law) 🔨	1	1	0	0	2	0	0	0	0	2	6

Sheet B	1	2	3	4	5	6	7	8	9	10	Final
Germany (Neßler) 🔨	1	0	0	0	1	1	1	1	0	0	5
Japan (Katoh)	0	1	0	0	0	0	0	0	1	1	3

Sheet C	1	2	3	4	5	6	7	8	9	10	Final
Norway (Nordby) 🔨	0	0	0	3	0	1	0	1	0	0	5
Switzerland (Ebnöther)	1	0	1	0	2	0	1	0	1	1	7

Sheet D	1	2	3	4	5	6	7	8	9	10	Final
Sweden (Gustafson) 🔨	0	2	0	1	1	2	0	3	0	0	9
Denmark (Bidstrup)	0	0	4	0	0	0	2	0	2	3	11

==== Draw 5 ====
February 14, 9:00

Sheet A	1	2	3	4	5	6	7	8	9	10	Final
Germany (Neßler)	0	0	2	0	1	0	0	2	0	0	5
Norway (Nordby) 🔨	1	0	0	2	0	2	1	0	1	3	10

Sheet B	1	2	3	4	5	6	7	8	9	10	Final
Russia (Jarkova)	0	0	0	1	0	1	0	1	0	2	5
Great Britain (Martin) 🔨	1	1	1	0	1	0	2	0	2	0	8

Sheet C	1	2	3	4	5	6	7	8	9	10	Final
Denmark (Bustrup) 🔨	1	0	0	2	0	2	0	1	2	1	9
United States (Erickson)	0	0	1	0	2	0	1	0	0	0	4

Sheet D	1	2	3	4	5	6	7	8	9	10	Final
Japan (Katoh) 🔨	1	0	1	0	1	1	0	0	2	1	7
Switzerland (Ebnöther)	0	1	0	2	0	0	2	3	0	0	8

==== Draw 6 ====
February 14, 19:00

Sheet A	1	2	3	4	5	6	7	8	9	10	Final
Russia (Jarkova) 🔨	1	0	1	2	0	2	0	0	1	0	7
Denmark (Bidstrup)	0	0	0	0	1	0	2	1	0	1	5

Sheet B	1	2	3	4	5	6	7	8	9	10	Final
United States (Erickson)	0	1	0	1	0	0	2	1	1	0	6
Switzerland (Ebnöther) 🔨	1	0	2	0	1	1	0	0	0	2	7

Sheet C	1	2	3	4	5	6	7	8	9	10	Final
Sweden (Gustafson) 🔨	0	2	2	3	0	0	2	1	X	X	10
Norway (Nordby)	0	0	0	0	2	1	0	0	X	X	3

Sheet D	1	2	3	4	5	6	7	8	9	10	Final
Canada (Law) 🔨	2	2	0	2	0	1	0	2	X	X	9
Great Britain (Martin)	0	0	1	0	2	0	1	0	X	X	4

==== Draw 7 ====
February 15, 14:00

Sheet A	1	2	3	4	5	6	7	8	9	10	Final
Great Britain (Martin) 🔨	0	3	0	0	1	0	1	0	0	2	7
Switzerland (Ebnöther)	0	0	1	0	0	1	0	1	1	0	4

Sheet B	1	2	3	4	5	6	7	8	9	10	11	Final
Japan (Katoh) 🔨	0	1	0	0	3	0	1	1	0	1	0	7
Sweden (Gustafson)	1	0	1	1	0	3	0	0	1	0	1	8

Sheet C	1	2	3	4	5	6	7	8	9	10	Final
Germany (Neßler) 🔨	1	0	0	0	0	1	0	2	0	0	4
Canada (Law)	0	0	1	0	3	0	2	0	2	0	8

Sheet D	1	2	3	4	5	6	7	8	9	10	Final
Norway (Nordby) 🔨	0	0	1	1	0	3	0	0	0	0	5
Russia (Jarkova)	0	0	0	0	1	0	1	1	0	1	4

==== Draw 8 ====
February 16, 9:00

Sheet A	1	2	3	4	5	6	7	8	9	10	Final
Canada (Law)	0	2	0	2	1	0	0	2	2	X	9
Japan (Katoh) 🔨	1	0	2	0	0	0	1	0	0	X	4

Sheet B	1	2	3	4	5	6	7	8	9	10	Final
Russia (Jarkova)	0	0	0	1	0	1	0	1	0	1	4
United States (Erickson) 🔨	2	1	0	0	4	0	1	0	3	0	11

Sheet C	1	2	3	4	5	6	7	8	9	10	Final
Great Britain (Martin)	0	1	0	3	0	2	0	2	0	0	8
Denmark (Bidstrup) 🔨	1	0	1	0	1	0	1	0	1	1	6

Sheet D	1	2	3	4	5	6	7	8	9	10	Final
Germany (Neßler) 🔨	1	0	2	0	1	0	1	0	0	2	7
Sweden (Gustafson)	0	1	0	1	0	1	0	2	0	0	5

==== Draw 9 ====
February 16, 19:00

Sheet A	1	2	3	4	5	6	7	8	9	10	Final
United States (Erickson) 🔨	0	1	0	1	0	2	0	0	2	1	7
Germany (Neßler)	1	0	0	0	1	0	3	1	0	0	6

Sheet B	1	2	3	4	5	6	7	8	9	10	Final
Canada (Law) 🔨	2	1	0	1	0	2	0	0	2	1	9
Denmark (Bidstrup)	0	0	1	0	1	0	1	1	0	0	4

Sheet C	1	2	3	4	5	6	7	8	9	10	11	Final
Switzerland (Ebnöther)	0	0	0	2	0	3	0	1	0	1	0	7
Sweden (Gustafson) 🔨	2	2	0	0	1	0	0	0	2	0	1	8

Sheet D	1	2	3	4	5	6	7	8	9	10	Final
Japan (Katoh)	0	0	1	0	0	1	0	0	2	1	5
Norway (Nordby) 🔨	1	0	0	0	2	0	4	1	0	0	8

==== Draw 10 ====
February 17, 14:00

Sheet A	1	2	3	4	5	6	7	8	9	10	Final
Norway (Nordby)	1	0	2	0	1	1	0	1	2	1	9
Denmark (Bidstrup) 🔨	0	1	0	2	0	0	1	0	0	0	4

Sheet C	1	2	3	4	5	6	7	8	9	10	Final
Russia (Jarkova) 🔨	1	0	1	0	1	0	1	1	0	1	6
Japan (Katoh)	0	2	0	2	0	2	0	0	1	0	7

Sheet D	1	2	3	4	5	6	7	8	9	10	11	Final
Great Britain (Martin) 🔨	1	0	0	1	0	2	0	0	1	0	0	5
United States (Erickson)	0	1	0	0	1	0	1	0	0	2	1	6

==== Draw 11 ====
February 18, 9:00

Sheet B	1	2	3	4	5	6	7	8	9	10	Final
Great Britain (Martin)	0	1	0	2	0	0	1	0	1	0	5
Germany (Neßler) 🔨	0	0	2	0	1	1	0	2	0	1	7

Sheet C	1	2	3	4	5	6	7	8	9	10	Final
Norway (Nordby)	1	0	0	0	1	0	0	X	X	X	2
United States (Erickson) 🔨	0	2	1	3	0	4	1	X	X	X	11

Sheet D	1	2	3	4	5	6	7	8	9	10	Final
Switzerland (Ebnöther) 🔨	1	0	2	0	1	0	2	1	0	0	7
Canada (Law)	0	1	0	1	0	1	0	0	2	1	6

==== Draw 12 ====
February 18, 19:00

Sheet A	1	2	3	4	5	6	7	8	9	10	Final
Sweden (Gustafson)	2	0	0	4	0	1	0	0	2	0	9
Russia (Jarkova) 🔨	0	0	1	0	1	0	2	1	0	1	6

Sheet C	1	2	3	4	5	6	7	8	9	10	Final
Germany (Neßler)	0	1	0	0	0	2	0	1	0	X	4
Switzerland (Ebnöther) 🔨	2	0	0	1	2	0	1	0	4	X	10

Sheet D	1	2	3	4	5	6	7	8	9	10	Final
Denmark (Bidstrup)	0	2	0	0	1	0	2	0	0	0	5
Japan (Katoh) 🔨	2	0	0	2	0	1	0	0	0	1	6

=== Tiebreaker 1 ===
February 19, 9:00

Sheet C	1	2	3	4	5	6	7	8	9	10	Final
Sweden (Gustafson)	0	1	0	0	0	1	0	1	0	1	4
Great Britain (Martin) 🔨	0	0	1	2	1	0	1	0	1	0	6

Player Percentages
Sweden		Great Britain	
Elisabeth Persson	84%	Janice Rankin	81%
Louise Marmont	79%	Fiona MacDonald	69%
Katarina Nyberg	73%	Deborah Knox	80%
Elisabet Gustafson	72%	Rhona Martin	75%
Total	77%	Total	76%

=== Tiebreaker 2 ===
February 19, 14:00

Sheet B	1	2	3	4	5	6	7	8	9	10	Final
Great Britain (Martin) 🔨	0	0	1	0	1	3	1	0	3	X	9
Germany (Neßler)	0	1	0	2	0	0	0	2	0	X	5

Player Percentages
Great Britain		Germany	
Janice Rankin	92%	Karin Fischer	74%
Fiona MacDonald	83%	Heike Wieländer	43%
Deborah Knox	64%	Sabine Belkofer	79%
Rhona Martin	71%	Natalie Neßler	69%
Total	77%	Total	66%

=== Medal round ===
Semifinal
1	Canada	5
4	Great Britain	6
3	United States	4
2	Switzerland	9

Final
4	Great Britain	4
2	Switzerland	3
Bronze medal
1	Canada	9
3	United States	5

=== Semifinals ===
February 20, 9:00

Sheet B	1	2	3	4	5	6	7	8	9	10	Final
Switzerland (Ebnöther)	0	2	1	0	0	1	2	0	3	X	9
United States (Erickson) 🔨	1	0	0	1	1	0	0	1	0	X	4

Player Percentages
Switzerland		United States	
Laurence Bidaud	79%	Ann Swisshelm	71%
Tanya Frei	68%	Stacey Liapis	71%
Mirjam Ott	78%	Debbie McCormick	69%
Luzia Ebnöther	78%	Kari Erickson	53%
Total	76%	Total	66%

Sheet D	1	2	3	4	5	6	7	8	9	10	Final
Great Britain (Martin)	0	0	1	2	0	0	2	0	0	1	6
Canada (Law) 🔨	1	0	0	0	1	1	0	1	1	0	5

Player Percentages
(United Kingdom) Great Britain		Canada	
Janice Rankin	90%	Diane Nelson	93%
Fiona MacDonald	66%	Georgina Wheatcroft	76%
Deborah Knox	80%	Julie Skinner	64%
Rhona Martin	78%	Kelley Law	71%
Total	78%	Total	76%

=== Bronze medal game ===
February 21, 9:00

Sheet C	1	2	3	4	5	6	7	8	9	10	Final
United States (Erickson)	0	1	1	0	0	1	0	2	0	0	5
Canada (Law) 🔨	2	0	0	2	1	0	2	0	1	1	9

Player Percentages
United States		Canada	
Ann Swisshelm	83%	Diane Nelson	84%
Stacey Liapis	80%	Georgina Wheatcroft	85%
Debbie McCormick	76%	Julie Skinner	74%
Kari Erickson	56%	Kelley Law	63%
Total	75%	Total	76%

=== Gold medal game ===
February 21, 14:00

Sheet C	1	2	3	4	5	6	7	8	9	10	Final
Switzerland (Ebnöther)	0	0	0	1	0	0	0	1	1	0	3
Great Britain (Martin) 🔨	0	0	0	0	2	0	1	0	0	1	4

Player Percentages
Switzerland		(United Kingdom) Great Britain	
Laurence Bidaud	78%	Janice Rankin	85%
Tanya Frei	74%	Fiona MacDonald	79%
Mirjam Ott	90%	Deborah Knox	84%
Luzia Ebnöther	74%	Rhona Martin	74%
Total	79%	Total	80%

=== Final standings ===
Rank	Country	Skip	W	L
1st place, gold medalist(s)	(United Kingdom) Great Britain	Rhona Martin	9	4
2nd place, silver medalist(s)	Switzerland	Luzia Ebnöther	8	3
3rd place, bronze medalist(s)	Canada	Kelley Law	9	2
4	United States	Kari Erickson	6	5
5	Germany	Natalie Neßler	5	5
6	Sweden	Elisabet Gustafson	5	5
7	Norway	Dordi Nordby	4	5
8	Japan	Akiko Katoh	2	7
9	Denmark	Lene Bidstrup	2	7
10	Russia	Olga Jarkova	1	8

=== Top 5 player percentages ===
Leads	%	Seconds	%	Thirds	%	Skips	%
(Switzerland) Laurence Bidaud	84	(Canada) Georgina Wheatcroft	82	(Sweden) Katarina Nyberg	76	(Sweden) Elisabet Gustafson	77
(Japan) Mika Konaka	82	(Switzerland) Tanya Frei	81	(Canada) Julie Skinner	76	(Canada) Kelley Law	75
(United States) Ann Swisshelm	81	(United States) Stacey Liapis	80	(Norway) Hanne Woods	76	(United Kingdom) Rhona Martin	74
(Denmark) Avijaja Lund Nielsen	79	(Norway) Marianne Haslum	78	(United Kingdom) Deborah Knox	75	(United States) Kari Erickson	71
(United Kingdom) Janice Rankin	79	(Sweden) Louise Marmont	77	(Switzerland) Mirjam Ott	74	(Germany) Natalie Neßler	71
