= Luzia Ebnöther =

Swiss curler

Personal information
- Born: 19 October 1971 (age 54)
Medal record
Representing Switzerland
Women's Curling
Olympic Games
Silver medal – second place	2002 Salt Lake City	Team
World Championships
Silver medal – second place	2000 Glasgow
Bronze medal – third place	2004 Gävle

Luzia Ebnöther (born 19 October 1971) is a Swiss curler and Olympic medalist. She received a silver medal at the 2002 Winter Olympics in Salt Lake City.
