= Rhona Martin =

British curler and Olympic gold medalist

Rhona Martin MBE
- Curler
- Born: 12 October 1966 (age 60); Dunlop, Ayrshire, Scotland

Curling career
- World Championship: 1 (2000)
- European Championship: 6 (1996, 1998, 1999, 2001, 2005, 2006)
- Olympic: 2 (2002, 2006)
Medal record
Women's curling
Representing Great Britain
Olympic Games
Gold medal – first place	2002 Salt Lake City	Team
Representing Scotland
European Championships
Silver medal – second place	1998 Flims

Rhona Howie, MBE (born 12 October 1966, Ayrshire), better known under her married name, Rhona Martin, is a Scottish curler most famous for skipping the British women's team at the 2002 Winter Olympics, where the team claimed the gold medal. She has also skipped for the Scotland curling team at both the World and European Championships.

== Career ==
=== Early career ===
Martin was long known in Scottish curling circles for her uncanny knack of repeatedly failing to win the national championships at the final hurdle, but finally won the right to appear in a major international championship in 1998, where she was skip of the Scotland team that won a silver medal at the European Curling Championships. With some significant changes in personnel, she returned to the championships in Chamonix the following year, where the team was narrowly edged out of the medal placings.

In 2000, Martin's quartet won the Scottish Women's Curling Championship, defeating the team led by former Olympic skip Kirsty Hay in the final, and were therefore entitled to represent Scotland at the World Curling Championships, held that year in Glasgow. They performed well at the World Curling Championships, with a particular highlight of defeating the Canadian side skipped by Kelley Law in the round-robin stage of the competition. However, Law earned her revenge against Scotland in the semi-finals, leading Canada to a 10–6 win. Martin's team was disappointed after missing out on a medal by losing 10–5 to Dordi Nordby's Norwegian outfit in the subsequent play-off.

=== 2002 Olympics ===
The fourth-place finish at the World Championships left the team well placed to secure its place as Great Britain's representatives at the Salt Lake City Olympics in 2002, selection for which was based on performances in the World and European Championships over the whole four-year Olympic cycle. Crucially, though, changes in the team's line-up meant that the European silver medal in 1998 was discounted, meaning that the team skipped by former world junior champion Julia Ewart, which represented Scotland at the 2001 World Championships in Lausanne, had the potential to be selected. Ewart recovered from a slow start to string together an extraordinary sequence of wins; a gold for Scotland would take Ewart and her teammates to the Olympics, and a silver would result in a special play-off to decide the selection. However, Scotland were derailed in the semi-final by Sweden, allowing Martin's team to represent Great Britain in Salt Lake City.

After battling illness, Martin arrived in Salt Lake City, and she and her teammates found their Olympic form early, reaching the brink of qualification for the semi-finals by winning five out of their first seven round-robin matches. However, the USA team came back to win against Martin's with a steal, and the British team then succumbed to Germany in the concluding round-robin match. The team's chances of progressing were thus dependent on a Swiss win over Germany. In order to progress to the semi-finals, it was necessary for the British team to win two successive tie-break matches against Sweden and Germany, which was achieved. The win over Sweden was an upset as Elisabeth Gustafsson was a 4 time World Champion.

For their semi-final match, the British team was paired with Kelley Law's Canadian team, to whom three members of Martin's team had lost whilst playing for Scotland at the same stage of the 2000 World Championships. Martin's team surged to an unexpected win, guaranteeing them a medal. As the underdog against Switzerland's Luzia Ebnother, the 2nd seed and a former World and European silver medalist, Britain won the final with Martin's last stone, often described as a difficult draw. The team of Martin, Debbie Knox, Fiona MacDonald and Janice Rankin thus became Great Britain's first gold medallists in any sport at the Winter Olympics since Jayne Torvill and Christopher Dean came first in the ice dancing of the 1984 Winter Olympics. Later that year, Martin was awarded an MBE for services to curling.

=== Post-Olympic career ===
Martin's team lost to Jackie Lockhart's rink in the three-match final of the Scottish Championships, played within days of their return to Scotland. Attention was focused on Lockhart, whose team subsequently won the World Championships for Scotland, with Lockhart selecting the same stone used by Martin to seal victory in the Olympics for her own winning delivery. The rock was dubbed the Stone of Destiny, and is now housed in a Scottish sports museum. In 2005, Martin was back on the world stage, when her all-star team (including Lockhart at the second position) finished fifth at the European Championships.

Prior to the 2006 Winter Olympics, it was reported that Martin was living on welfare and that her financial problems were causing her to live apart from her husband. Her husband Keith had recently had trouble with his computer business, and they were forced to move into government housing. Martin had considered quitting curling, but her two children encouraged her to stay. Martin skipped the British Olympic team during the 2006 Winter Olympics, where the team was eliminated during the round-robin stage.

In 2007, Martin halted playing for the time being and focused on coaching. She spent 3 years doing the UK Sport Elite Coach Programme whilst delivering the Performance Development Coach role within the national governing body for curling, the Royal Caledonian Curling Club, looking after the National and Regional Academies. Martin joined the BBC commentary team for the 2010 Vancouver Winter Olympics, overseeing the curling along with Steve Cram. Prior to this, Martin also made several TV guest appearances on shows that included A Question of Sport, The Weakest Link and This Morning. In 2010, Rhona was appointed as the new women's head coach of the British and Scottish curling performance squad and was part of a five strong coaching team looking forward to the 2014 Winter Olympics. In June 2012, Martin was part of the London 2012 Summer Olympics torch relay, taking the flame through Glasgow whilst being cheered on by the public. She also attended many Olympics events in London in her role as a games ambassador. Also in 2012, Martin was inducted into the Scottish Sports Hall of Fame.

Martin joined the BBC's commentary team for coverage of curling at the 2018 Winter Olympics, and again at the 2022 Winter Olympics.

=== Medal theft ===
In May 2014, Martin's Olympic gold medal along with other Olympic memorabilia was stolen from a museum in Dumfries. In September 2017, two men were convicted of the theft, with a third convicted in 2019.

== Awards ==
- Frances Brodie Award: 2000
