= Tanya Frei =

Swiss curler

Personal information
- Born: 31 May 1972 (age 54) Bern, Switzerland
Medal record
Representing Switzerland
Women's Curling
Olympic Games
Silver medal – second place	2002 Salt Lake City	Team
World Championships
Silver medal – second place	2000 Glasgow
Bronze medal – third place	2004 Gävle

Tanya Frei (born 31 May 1972) is a Swiss curler and Olympic medalist. She received a silver medal at the 2002 Winter Olympics in Salt Lake City.
