= Bent Ånund Ramsfjell =

Norwegian curler (born 1967)

- Curler ♂
- Born: 30 November 1967 (age 58); Oslo, Norway

Team
- Curling club: Stabekk Curlingklubb, Oslo
- Skip: Pål Trulsen
- Third: Lars Vågberg
- Second: Flemming Davanger
- Lead: Bent Ånund Ramsfjell
- Alternate: Torger Nergård
Medal record
Men's curling
Representing Norway
Olympic Games
Gold medal – first place	2002 Salt Lake City	Team
World Championships
Silver medal – second place	2002 Bismarck
Bronze medal – third place	2001 Lausanne
Bronze medal – third place	2003 Winnipeg
European Championships
Gold medal – first place	2005 Garmisch-Partenkirchen
Silver medal – second place	1989 Engelberg
Bronze medal – third place	2004 Sofia

Bent Ånund Ramsfjell (born 30 November 1967 in Oslo) is a Norwegian curler from Asker. He is the 2002 Olympic champion in men's curling. He is the younger brother of Eigil Ramsfjell, multiple curling world champion and bronze medallist at the 1998 Winter Olympics competition in Nagano.

Ramsfjell played lead for the Norwegian team skipped by Pål Trulsen. With the team, Ramsfjell has won an Olympic gold medal (2002), a European Curling Championships gold medal (2005), a World Championships silver medal (2002), two World Championships bronze medals (2001 and 2003) and a European Championships bronze medal (2004).

At the 1997 World Championships, Ramsfjell played second for Trulsen, and it was Ramsfjell's first worlds. In 1992, Ramsfjell was the lead for his brother Eigil Ramsfjell at the European championships, and was his alternate at the 1989 European championships. Bent played second for Thomas Ulsrud at the 1989 World Junior Curling Championships. His son Bendik Ramsfjell is also a curler.
