= Laurence Bidaud =

Swiss curler (born 1968)

Personal information
- Born: 22 March 1968 (age 58) Lausanne
Medal record
Representing Switzerland
Women's Curling
Olympic Games
Silver medal – second place	2002 Salt Lake City	Team
World Championships
Silver medal – second place	2000 Glasgow
Bronze medal – third place	2004 Gävle

Laurence Bidaud (born 22 March 1968) is a Swiss curler and Olympic medalist. She received a silver medal at the 2002 Winter Olympics in Salt Lake City.
