= Lars Vågberg =

Swedish-Norwegian curler (born 1967)

- Curler ♂
- Born: 30 June 1967 (age 59); Sollefteå, Sweden

Team
- Curling club: Stabekk Curlingklubb, Oslo
- Skip: Pål Trulsen
- Third: Lars Vågberg
- Second: Flemming Davanger
- Lead: Bent Ånund Ramsfjell
- Alternate: Torger Nergård

Curling career
- World Championship: 9 (1992, 1997, 1999, 2000, 2001, 2002, 2003, 2004, 2005)
- European Championship: 6 (1990, 1994, 1999, 2001, 2004, 2005)
- Olympic: 2 (2002, 2006)
- Other appearances: World Senior Curling Championships: 1 (2024)
Medal record
Men's curling
Representing Norway
Olympic Games
Gold medal – first place	2002 Salt Lake City	Team
World Championships
Silver medal – second place	2002 Bismarck
Bronze medal – third place	2001 Lausanne
Bronze medal – third place	2003 Winnipeg
European Championships
Gold medal – first place	2005 Garmisch-Partenkirchen
Bronze medal – third place	2004 Sofia
Representing Sweden
European Championships
Gold medal – first place	1990 Lillehammer
Bronze medal – third place	1994 Sundsvall

Lars Vågberg (born 30 June 1967 in Sollefteå, Sweden) is a Norwegian curler from Bærum. He is the 2002 Olympic champion in men's curling.

Vågberg began his international curling career in Sweden. In his first international tournament, he was the second Mikael Hasselborg's 1990 European Curling Championships winning team. With Hasselborg, he would finish 7th at the World Curling Championships in 1992 and won a bronze medal at the 1994 European Championships.

By 1997 Vågberg had moved to Norway. The 1997 World Championships would be the first for Vågberg as a Norwegian, and he played third for Pål Trulsen. While they finished 7th that year, the team would later go on to win two bronze medals (2001, 2003) and a silver (2002) at the Worlds. Most notably however was their victory at the 2002 Winter Olympics when they defeated Canadas' Kevin Martin in the final. The team added to their success with their first gold medal at the European Championships in 2005.

In 2010 (and before), Lars works at Belset Skole in Bærum, as a physical education teacher and advisor.

In 1995 he was inducted into the Swedish Curling Hall of Fame.
