= Markus Eggler =

Swiss curler and Olympic medalist

- Curler
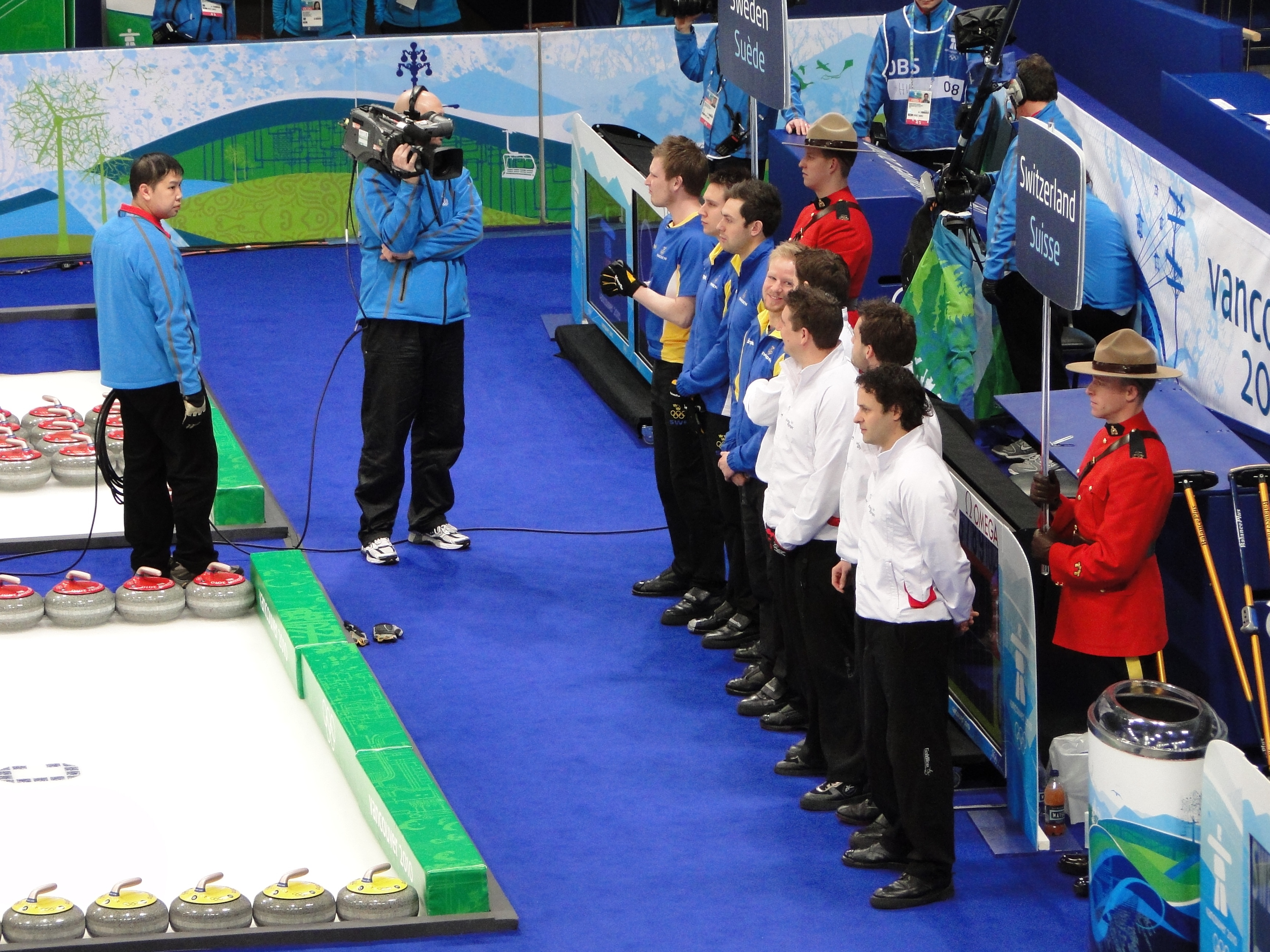

Curling career
- World Championship: 7 (1991, 1992, 1994; 2001, 2005, 2007, 2009)
- European Championship: 5 (1993, 2000, 2001, 2004, 2009)
Medal record
Curling
Representing Switzerland
Winter Olympics
Bronze medal – third place	2002 Salt Lake City
Bronze medal – third place	2010 Vancouver
World Curling Championships
Gold medal – first place	1992 Garmisch-Partenkirchen
Silver medal – second place	2001 Lausanne
Bronze medal – third place	1994 Oberstdorf
European Curling Championships
Silver medal – second place	2001 Vierumäki
Silver medal – second place	2009 Aberdeen
Bronze medal – third place	1993 Leukerbad
World Junior Curling Championships
Bronze medal – third place	1989 Markham

Markus Eggler (born 22 January 1969 in Thun) is a retired Swiss curler from Münchenstein. He is a two-time Olympic medalist, winning bronze medal in 2002 and 2010.

Eggler was the skip of the Swiss team at the 1986, 1987 and 1989 World Junior Curling Championships. At the 1989 event, he won a bronze medal. He then skipped the Swiss team at the World Curling Championships in 1991, 1992 and 1994. He was the world champion in 1992 when his Swiss team defeated Hammy McMillan's Scottish team in the final 6-3. Eggler won a bronze at the 1994 World Championships and a bronze at the 1993 European Curling Championships.

After 1994, Eggler would not return to international curling until 2000 when he played third for Andreas Schwaller at the European Championships. At the 2001 World Curling Championships, he played lead for Christof Schwaller and won the silver medal. At the 2001 European Championships, he won a silver playing second for Andreas Schwaller. Still playing second for Schwaller, Eggler won a bronze medal at the 2002 Winter Olympics. Eggler continues to play second for Andreas.

Eggler announced his retirement from curling in 2010.

== Teammates ==
2010 Vancouver Olympic Games

Ralph Stöckli, Skip

Jan Hauser, Third

Simon Strübin, Lead

Toni Müller, Alternate

2002 Salt Lake City Olympic Games

Andreas Schwaller, Skip

Christof Schwaller, Third

Damian Grichting, Lead

Marco Ramstein, Alternate
