= Marco Ramstein =

Swiss curler and Olympic medalist

- Curler
- Born: 22 November 1978 (age 47)

Team
- Curling club: CC St. Moritz, St. Moritz
- Skip: Christof Schwaller
- Third: Robert Hürlimann
- Second: Urs Eichhorn
- Lead: Marco Ramstein

Curling career
- World Championship: 2 (2001, 2005)
- European Championship: 3 (2000, 2001, 2004)
Medal record
Representing Switzerland
Men's Curling
Olympic Games
Bronze medal – third place	2002 Salt Lake City	Team
World championships
Silver medal – second place	2001 Lausanne	Team

Marco Ramstein (born 22 November 1978) is a Swiss curler and Olympic medalist. He received a bronze medal at the 2002 Winter Olympics in Salt Lake City.

He played for the Swiss team that received a silver medal at the 2001 world championships.

== Teammates ==
2002 Salt Lake City Olympic Games

Andreas Schwaller, Skip

Christof Schwaller, Third

Markus Eggler, Second

Damian Grichting, Lead
