= Peja Lindholm =

Swedish curler and curling coach

- Curler
- Born: 2 June 1970 (age 56); Östersund, Sweden

Curling career
- World Championship: 8 (1993, 1995, 1997, 1998, 2000, 2001, 2004, 2007)
- European Championship: 10 (1997, 1998, 1999, 2000, 2001, 2002, 2003, 2004, 2005, 2007)
- Olympic: 3 (1998, 2002, 2006)
Medal record
Men's Curling
Representing Sweden
World Championships
| Gold medal – first place | 1997 Berne |
| Gold medal – first place | 2001 Lausanne |
| Gold medal – first place | 2004 Gävle |
| Silver medal – second place | 1998 Kamloops |
| Silver medal – second place | 2000 Glasgow |
European Championships
| Gold medal – first place | 1998 Flims |
| Gold medal – first place | 2001 Vierumäki |
| Silver medal – second place | 2002 Grindelwald |
| Silver medal – second place | 2003 Courmayeur |
| Silver medal – second place | 2004 Sofia |
| Silver medal – second place | 2005 Garmisch-Partenkirchen |
| Bronze medal – third place | 2000 Oberstdorf |
World Junior Championships
| Gold medal – first place | 1989 Markham |
| Silver medal – second place | 1988 Füssen |
| Bronze medal – third place | 1990 Portage la Praire |

Peter "Peja" Rutger Lindholm (born 2 June 1970 in Östersund, Sweden) is a Swedish retired curler. Before Niklas Edin, many regarded him as the best European skip ever.

Over his two-decade curling playing career, Lindholm won three World Championships as a skip, winning in 1997, 2001 and 2004, and also being runner up in both 1998 and 2000. He is also a two-time European Champion (1998 and 2001) and is a former World Junior Champion (1989). He had constant disappointment in his career though at the Olympics, where despite being one of the gold medal favorites in each of the 1998, 2002, and 2006 Games, his team ended up medalless, coming closest in 2002 with a 4th place finish.

Lindholm is also known for his success against his career nemesis Kevin Martin, running up a streak of 10 consecutive wins which was broken in the semi-finals of the 2002 Olympics. He also had an excellent record vs. the all-time great team of Randy Ferbey in the 2000s.

Lindholm announced his retirement from curling following the 2007 European Curling Championships.

== Coaching career ==
In 2011, Lindholm became the coach of the Swedish men's team skipped by Niklas Edin, coaching them in the World Championships. He also coached the Swedish women's team at the 2010 World Championship. He then became the Swedish national coach in 2010 when Fredrik Lindberg became the team coach.

He was also either the Coach or Captain of Team Europe at the Continental Cup each time it was held from 2008–2015.

Lindholm left his position with the Swedish teams 2019 when he was recruited to lead the Chinese teams over the Olympic Games 2022 in Beijing. He was then asked to coach the Danish women team at the European Championship. It became a success since the team won the gold.

in 2023 Lindholm became the CEO for Östersunds Fotbollsklubb.

== Awards ==
- Colin Campbell Award: 1995
- WJCC Sportsmanship Award: 1990
- WJCC All-Star skip: 1989, 1990
- WJCC All-Star second: 1991
- In 1998 he was inducted into the Swedish Curling Hall of Fame.

== See also ==
- 1997 Ford World Curling Championships
- 2001 Ford World Curling Championships
- 2004 Ford World Curling Championships
