= Andreas Schwaller =

Swiss curler and Olympic medalist

Medal record

Curling

Olympic Games
Bronze medal – third place	2002 Salt Lake City	Team

World Championships
Silver medal – second place	2001 Lausanne	Team

European Championships
Gold medal – first place	2006 Basel	A Group
Silver medal – second place	2001 Vierumäki	A Group
Bronze medal – third place	1993 Leukerbad	A Group

Andreas "Andi" Schwaller (born 8 July 1970 in Recherswil) is a Swiss curler. He received a bronze medal at the 2002 Winter Olympics in Salt Lake City.

Schwaller started playing curling in 1982. He plays in fourth position as a skip and is right-handed.

In 2001 he won a silver medal at the World Curling Championships, in his home country. He scored an upset victory over Randy Ferbey in the semifinals, before falling to Peja Lindholm in the final.

At the 2002 Winter Olympics he looked set to make the gold medal game, leading eventual gold medalist Pål Trulsen 6-3 after 8 ends in the semifinal. Trulsen though made a large comeback, stealing in the 10th end, and then coming up with the winning stolen point in the 11th when Schwaller wrecked on a guard. He recovered to win the bronze medal game over Sweden, skipped by Lindholm, gaining revenge from the previous years World Championship final result, and earning an Olympic medal.

His wife is Heike Schwaller, his daughters are Xenia Schwaller and Zoe Schwaller. His brother is Christof Schwaller.

== Teammates ==
2002 Salt Lake City Olympic Games

Christof Schwaller, Third

Markus Eggler, Second

Damian Grichting, Lead

Marco Ramstein, Alternate
