= Debbie Knox =

British curler (born 1968)

Medal record

Curling

Representing Great Britain

Olympic Games
Gold medal – first place	2002 Salt Lake	Women's tournament

Deborah Knox MBE (born 26 September 1968 in Dunfermline) is a British curler from Lochgelly, Scotland. She is best known for being part of the British curling team that won gold in the 2002 winter Olympics.

In the 2002 Olympics, Knox played third for Rhona Martin. She was also a member of the team again at the 2006 Winter Olympics as an alternate, however the team did not medal.

She was appointed Member of the Order of the British Empire (MBE) in the 2002 Birthday Honours.
