= Damian Grichting =

Swiss curler

Medal record

Curling

Olympic Games
Bronze medal – third place	2002 Salt Lake City	Team

European Championships
Gold medal – first place	2006 Basel	A Group

Damian Grichting (born 8 April 1973 in Leukerbad) is a Swiss curler. He received a bronze medal at the 2002 Winter Olympics in Salt Lake City.

Grichting plays in first position and is right-handed.

== Teammates ==
2002 Salt Lake City Olympic Games

Andreas Schwaller, Skip

Christof Schwaller, Third

Markus Eggler, Second

Marco Ramstein, Alternate
