= Flemming Davanger =

Norwegian curler (born 1963)

- Curler ♂
- Born: 1 April 1963 (age 63); Bergen, Norway

Team
- Curling club: Stabekk Curlingklubb, Oslo
- Skip: Pål Trulsen
- Third: Lars Vågberg
- Second: Flemming Davanger
- Lead: Bent Ånund Ramsfjell
- Alternate: Torger Nergård
Medal record
Men's curling
Representing Norway
Olympic Games
Gold medal – first place	2002 Salt Lake	Team
Silver medal – second place	1992 Albertville (demonstration)	Team

Flemming Davanger (born 1 April 1963 in Bergen, Norway) is a Norwegian curler from Bærum. He is the 2002 Olympic champion in men's curling.

== Curling career ==
In his third World Junior Curling Championships in 1983, Davanger, playing second Pål Trulsen's Norwegian team picked up a silver medal, losing to Canada's John Base in the final. In 1986, Davanger played in his first World Curling Championships playing third for Tormod Andreassen, and they finished in sixth place. Later that year, the team picked up a bronze at the 1986 European Curling Championships.

Davanger's next success would come at the 1992 Winter Olympics, when curling was a demonstration sport. Davanger, now playing second for Andreassen would bring home the silver medal for Norway, much to the delight of his coach Forest Juziuk. After a couple of poor performances at the World Championships, Davanger moved to play second for his old junior skip Pål Trulsen. Their first World Championships was in 1999 when they finished in fifth. 2000 was no better, when they finished in 7th place. Finally in 2001 Norway got a break, picking up the bronze medal. They would then go on to win the gold medal at the 2002 Winter Olympics followed by a silver at the World Championships that year. Since then, the team has had some success. They have finished no worse than fourth place at the Worlds or the European Championships. They picked up a bronze at the Worlds in 2003, a bronze at the European Championships in 2004 and a gold at the European Championships in 2005.
