= Fiona MacDonald =

Scottish curler

Medal record

Curling

Representing Great Britain

Olympic Games
Gold medal – first place	2002 Salt Lake	Women's tournament

Representing Scotland

World Junior Championships
Gold medal – first place	1993 Grindelwald	

Fiona MacDonald MBE (born 9 December 1974 as Fiona Brown) is a Scottish curler and Olympic champion, born in Paisley. She received a gold medal at the 2002 Winter Olympics in Salt Lake City.

She was appointed Member of the Order of the British Empire (MBE) in the 2002 Birthday Honours. She was previously married to fellow Scottish curler Ewan MacDonald.
