= List of World Women's Curling Champions =

The following is a list of the winners of the World Women's Curling Championships since the inception of the championships in 1979.

Name of fourth, then third, second, lead and alternate (if have) is listed in the team member list. Name of skip is in Bold.

== Medallists ==
Women's world curling champions
Year	Gold		Silver		Bronze	
Year	Country	Team	Country	Team	Country	Team
1979	Switzerland	**Gaby Casanova**; Rosi Manger; Linda Thommen; Betty Bourquin	Sweden	**Birgitta Törn**; Katarina Hultling; Susanne Gynning-Ödling; Gunilla Bergman	Canada	**Lindsay Sparkes**; Dawn Knowles; Robin Wilson; Lorraine Anne Bowles
1979	Switzerland	**Gaby Casanova**; Rosi Manger; Linda Thommen; Betty Bourquin	Sweden	**Birgitta Törn**; Katarina Hultling; Susanne Gynning-Ödling; Gunilla Bergman	Scotland	**Beth Lindsay**; Ann McKellar; Jeanette Johnston; May Taylor
1980	Canada	**Marj Mitchell**; Nancy Kerr; Shirley McKendry; Wendy Leach	Sweden	**Elisabeth Högström**; Carina Olsson; Birgitta Sewik; Karin Sjögren	Scotland	**Betty Law**; Bea Sinclair; Jane Sanderson; Carol Hamilton
1981	Sweden	**Elisabeth Högström**; Carina Olsson; Birgitta Sewik; Karin Sjögren	Canada	**Susan Seitz**; Judy Erickson; Myrna McKay; Betty McCracken	Norway	**Anne Jøtun Bakke**; Bente Hoel; Elisabeth Skogen; Hilde Jøtun
1982	Denmark	Helena Blach; **Mariane Jørgensen**; Astrid Birnbaum; Jette Olsen	Sweden	**Elisabeth Högström**; Katarina Hultling; Birgitta Sewik; Karin Sjögren	Scotland	**Isobel Torrance**; Isobel Waddell; Marion Armour; Margaret Wiseman
1983	Switzerland	**Erika Müller**; Barbara Meyer; Barbara Meier; Cristina Wirz	Norway	**Eva Vanvik**; Åse Vanvik; Alvhild Fugelmo; Liv Grøseth	Canada	**Penny LaRocque**; Sharon Horne; Cathy Caudle; Pamela Sanford
1984	Canada	**Connie Laliberte**; Chris More; Corinne Peters; Janet Arnott	Switzerland	**Brigitte Kienast**; Irene Bürgi; Erika Frewein; Evi Rüegsegger	West Germany	**Almut Hege**; Josefine Einsle; Suzanne Koch; Petra Tschetsch
1985	Canada	**Linda Moore**; Lindsay Sparkes; Debbie Jones; Laurie Carney	Scotland	**Isobel Torrance Jr.** Margaret Craig; Jackie Steele; Sheila Harvey	Switzerland	**Erika Müller**; Barbara Meyer; Barbara Meier; Franziska Jöhr
1986	Canada	**Marilyn Darte**; Kathy McEdwards; Christine Jurgenson; Jan Augustyn	West Germany	**Andrea Schöpp**; Monika Wagner; Stephanie Mayr; Elinore Schöpp	Sweden	Maud Nordlander; **Inga Arfwidsson**; Ulrika Åkerberg; Barbro Arfwidsson
1987	Canada	**Pat Sanders**; Georgina Hawkes; Louise Herlinveaux; Deb Massullo	West Germany	**Andrea Schöpp**; Almut Hege; Monika Wagner; Elinore Schöpp	Switzerland	**Marianne Flotron**; Gisela Peter; Beatrice Frei; Caroline Rück
1988	West Germany	**Andrea Schöpp**; Almut Hege-Schöll; Monika Wagner; Suzanne Fink	Canada	**Heather Houston**; Lorraine Lang; Diane Adams; Tracy Kennedy	Sweden	**Anette Norberg**; Anna Rindeskog; Sofie Marmont; Louise Marmont; Helena Klange
1989	Canada	**Heather Houston**; Lorraine Lang; Diane Adams; Tracy Kennedy; Gloria Taylor	Norway	**Trine Trulsen**; Dordi Nordby; Hanne Pettersen; Mette Halvorsen; Marianne Aspelin	West Germany	**Andrea Schöpp**; Monika Wagner; Barbara Haller; Christina Haller; Elinore Schöpp
1989	Canada	**Heather Houston**; Lorraine Lang; Diane Adams; Tracy Kennedy; Gloria Taylor	Norway	**Trine Trulsen**; Dordi Nordby; Hanne Pettersen; Mette Halvorsen; Marianne Aspelin	Sweden	**Anette Norberg**; Anna Rindeskog; Sofie Marmont; Louise Marmont; Ann-Catrin Kjerr
1990	Norway	**Dordi Nordby**; Hanne Pettersen; Mette Halvorsen; Anne Bakke	Scotland	**Carolyn Hutchison**; Claire Milne; Mairi Milne; Tara Brown	Canada	**Alison Goring**; Kristin Turcotte; Andrea Lawes; Cheryl McPherson; Anne Merklinger
1990	Norway	**Dordi Nordby**; Hanne Pettersen; Mette Halvorsen; Anne Bakke	Scotland	**Carolyn Hutchison**; Claire Milne; Mairi Milne; Tara Brown	Denmark	**Helena Blach**; Malene Krause; Lone Kristoffersen; Gitte Larsen
1991	Norway	**Dordi Nordby**; Hanne Pettersen; Mette Halvorsen; Anne Jøtun; Marianne Aspelin	Canada	**Julie Sutton**; Jodie Sutton; Melissa Soligo; Karri Willms; Elaine Dagg-Jackson	Scotland	**Christine Allison**; Claire Milne; Mairi Milne; Margaret Richardson
1991	Norway	**Dordi Nordby**; Hanne Pettersen; Mette Halvorsen; Anne Jøtun; Marianne Aspelin	Canada	**Julie Sutton**; Jodie Sutton; Melissa Soligo; Karri Willms; Elaine Dagg-Jackson	Sweden	**Anette Norberg**; Cathrine Norberg; Anna Rindeskog; Helene Granqvist; Ann-Catrin Kjerr
1992	Sweden	**Elisabet Johansson**; Katarina Nyberg; Louise Marmont; Elisabeth Persson; Annika Lööf	United States	**Lisa Schoeneberg**; Amy Hatten-Wright; Lori Mountford; Jill Jones	Canada	**Connie Laliberte**; Laurie Allen; Cathy Gauthier; Janet Arnott
1992	Sweden	**Elisabet Johansson**; Katarina Nyberg; Louise Marmont; Elisabeth Persson; Annika Lööf	United States	**Lisa Schoeneberg**; Amy Hatten-Wright; Lori Mountford; Jill Jones	Switzerland	**Janet Hürlimann**; Angela Lutz; Laurence Bidaud; Sandrine Mercier
1993	Canada	**Sandra Peterson**; Jan Betker; Joan McCusker; Marcia Gudereit; Anita Ford	Germany	**Janet Strayer**; Josefine Einsle; Petra Tschetsch-Hiltensberger; Karen Fischer; Elisabeth Ländle	Norway	**Dordi Nordby**; Hanne Pettersen; Marianne Aspelin; Cecilie Torhaug
1993	Canada	**Sandra Peterson**; Jan Betker; Joan McCusker; Marcia Gudereit; Anita Ford	Germany	**Janet Strayer**; Josefine Einsle; Petra Tschetsch-Hiltensberger; Karen Fischer; Elisabeth Ländle	Sweden	**Elisabet Johansson**; Katarina Nyberg; Louise Marmont; Elisabeth Persson; Annika Lööf
1994	Canada	**Sandra Peterson**; Jan Betker; Joan McCusker; Marcia Gudereit; Anita Ford	Scotland	**Christine Cannon**; Claire Milne; Mairi Herd; Janice Watt; Sheila Harvey	Germany	**Josefine Einsle**; Michaela Greif; Karin Fischer; Elisabeth Ländle; Sabine Weber
1994	Canada	**Sandra Peterson**; Jan Betker; Joan McCusker; Marcia Gudereit; Anita Ford	Scotland	**Christine Cannon**; Claire Milne; Mairi Herd; Janice Watt; Sheila Harvey	Sweden	**Elisabet Johansson**; Katarina Nyberg; Louise Marmont; Elisabeth Persson; Helena Svensson
1995	Sweden	**Elisabet Gustafson**; Katarina Nyberg; Louise Marmont; Elisabeth Persson; Helena Svensson	Canada	**Connie Laliberte**; Cathy Overton; Cathy Gauthier; Janet Arnott; Debbie Jones-Walker	Norway	**Dordi Nordby**; Hanne Pettersen; Marianne Aspelin; Cecilie Torhaug
1996	Canada	**Marilyn Bodogh**; Kim Gellard; Corie Beveridge; Jane Hooper-Perroud; Lisa Savage	United States	**Lisa Schoeneberg**; Erika Brown; Lori Mountford; Allison Darragh; Debbie Henry	Norway	**Dordi Nordby**; Marianne Haslum; Marianne Aspelin; Kristin Løvseth; Hanne Woods
1997	Canada	**Sandra Schmirler**; Jan Betker; Joan McCusker; Marcia Gudereit; Atina Ford	Norway	**Dordi Nordby**; Marianne Haslum; Marianne Aspelin; Kristin Løvseth; Hanne Woods	Denmark	**Helena Blach Lavrsen**; Margit Pörtner; Dorthe Holm; Lisa Richardson; Jane Bidstrup
1998	Sweden	**Elisabet Gustafson**; Katarina Nyberg; Louise Marmont; Elisabeth Persson; Margaretha Lindahl	Denmark	**Helena Blach Lavrsen**; Margit Pörtner; Dorthe Holm; Lisa Richardson; Trine Qvist	Canada	**Cathy Borst**; Heather Godberson; Brenda Bohmer; Kate Horne; Rona McGregor
1999	Sweden	**Elisabet Gustafson**; Katarina Nyberg; Louise Marmont; Elisabeth Persson; Margaretha Lindahl	United States	**Patti Lank**; Erika Brown; Allison Darragh; Tracy Sachtjen; Barbara Perrella	Denmark	**Lene Bidstrup**; Malene Krause; Susanne Slotsager; Avijaja Petri; Lillian Frøhling
2000	Canada	**Kelley Law**; Julie Skinner; Georgina Wheatcroft; Diane Nelson; Cheryl Noble	Switzerland	**Luzia Ebnöther**; Nicole Strausak; Tanya Frei; Nadia Raspe; Laurence Bidaud	Norway	**Dordi Nordby**; Hanne Woods; Marianne Aspelin; Cecilie Torhaug; Kristin Tøsse Løvseth
2001	Canada	**Colleen Jones**; Kim Kelly; Mary-Anne Waye; Nancy Delahunt; Laine Peters	Sweden	**Anette Norberg**; Cathrine Norberg; Eva Lund; Helena Lingham; Maria Engholm	Denmark	**Lene Bidstrup**; Malene Krause; Susanne Slotsager; Avijaja Lund Nielsen; Lisa Richardson
2002	Scotland	**Jackie Lockhart**; Sheila Swan; Katriona Fairweather; Anne Laird; Edith Loudon	Sweden	Maria Engholm; **Margaretha Sigfridsson**; Annette Jörnlind; Anna-Kari Lindholm; Ulrika Bergman	Norway	**Dordi Nordby**; Hanne Woods; Marianne Haslum; Camilla Holth; Trine Trulsen Vågberg
2003	United States	**Debbie McCormick**; Allison Pottinger; Ann Swisshelm Silver; Tracy Sachtjen; Joni Cotten	Canada	**Colleen Jones**; Kim Kelly; Mary-Anne Waye; Nancy Delahunt; Laine Peters	Sweden	**Anette Norberg**; Eva Lund; Cathrine Norberg; Helena Lingham; Maria Prytz
2004	Canada	**Colleen Jones**; Kim Kelly; Mary-Anne Arsenault; Nancy Delahunt; Mary Sue Radford	Norway	**Dordi Nordby**; Linn Githmark; Marianne Haslum; Camilla Holth; Marianne Rørvik	Switzerland	**Luzia Ebnöther**; Carmen Küng; Tanya Frei; Nadia Röthlisberger-Raspe; Laurence Bidaud
2005	Sweden	**Anette Norberg**; Eva Lund; Cathrine Norberg; Anna Bergström; Ulrika Bergman	United States	**Cassandra Johnson**; Jamie Johnson; Jessica Schultz; Maureen Brunt; Courtney George	Norway	**Dordi Nordby**; Linn Githmark; Marianne Haslum; Camilla Holth; Marianne Rørvik
2006	Sweden	**Anette Norberg**; Eva Lund; Cathrine Lindahl; Anna Svärd; Ulrika Bergman	United States	**Debbie McCormick**; Allison Pottinger; Nicole Joraanstad; Natalie Nicholson; Caitlin Maroldo	Canada	**Kelly Scott**; Jeanna Schraeder; Sasha Carter; Renee Simons; Michelle Allen
2007	Canada	**Kelly Scott**; Jeanna Schraeder; Sasha Carter; Renee Simons; Michelle Allen	Denmark	Madeleine Dupont; Denise Dupont; **Angelina Jensen**; Camilla Jensen; Ane Hansen	Scotland	**Kelly Wood**; Jackie Lockhart; Lorna Vevers; Lindsay Wood; Karen Addison
2008	Canada	**Jennifer Jones**; Cathy Overton-Clapham; Jill Officer; Dawn Askin; Jennifer Clark-Rouire	China	**Wang Bingyu**; Liu Yin; Yue Qingshuang; Zhou Yan; Liu Jinli	Switzerland	**Mirjam Ott**; Carmen Schäfer; Valeria Spälty; Janine Greiner; Carmen Küng
2009	China	**Wang Bingyu**; Liu Yin; Yue Qingshuang; Zhou Yan; Liu Jinli	Sweden	**Anette Norberg**; Eva Lund; Cathrine Lindahl; Margaretha Sigfridsson; Kajsa Bergström	Denmark	Madeleine Dupont; Denise Dupont; **Angelina Jensen**; Camilla Jensen; Ane Hansen
2010	Germany	**Andrea Schöpp**; Melanie Robillard; Monika Wagner; Stella Heiß; Corinna Scholz	Scotland	**Eve Muirhead**; Kelly Wood; Lorna Vevers; Anne Laird; Sarah Reid	Canada	**Jennifer Jones**; Cathy Overton-Clapham; Jill Officer; Dawn Askin; Jennifer Clark-Rouire
2011	Sweden	**Anette Norberg**; Cecilia Östlund; Sara Carlsson; Liselotta Lennartsson; Karin Rudström	Canada	**Amber Holland**; Kim Schneider; Tammy Schneider; Heather Kalenchuk; Jolene Campbell	China	**Wang Bingyu**; Liu Yin; Yue Qingshuang; Zhou Yan; Yu Xinna
2012	Switzerland	**Mirjam Ott**; Carmen Schäfer; Carmen Küng; Janine Greiner; Alina Pätz	Sweden	Maria Prytz; Christina Bertrup; Maria Wennerström; **Margaretha Sigfridsson**; Sabina Kraupp	Canada	**Heather Nedohin**; Beth Iskiw; Jessica Mair; Laine Peters; Amy Nixon
2013	Scotland	**Eve Muirhead**; Anna Sloan; Vicki Adams; Claire Hamilton; Lauren Gray	Sweden	Maria Prytz; Christina Bertrup; Maria Wennerström; **Margaretha Sigfridsson**; Agnes Knochenhauer	Canada	**Rachel Homan**; Emma Miskew; Alison Kreviazuk; Lisa Weagle; Stephanie LeDrew
2014	Switzerland	**Binia Feltscher**; Irene Schori; Franziska Kaufmann; Christine Urech; Carole Howald	Canada	**Rachel Homan**; Emma Miskew; Alison Kreviazuk; Lisa Weagle; Stephanie LeDrew	Russia	**Anna Sidorova**; Margarita Fomina; Aleksandra Saitova; Ekaterina Galkina; Nkeirouka Ezekh
2015	Switzerland	**Alina Pätz**; Nadine Lehmann; Marisa Winkelhausen; Nicole Schwägli; Carole Howald	Canada	**Jennifer Jones**; Kaitlyn Lawes; Jill Officer; Dawn McEwen; Jennifer Clark-Rouire	Russia	**Anna Sidorova**; Margarita Fomina; Alexandra Saitova; Ekaterina Galkina; Nkeirouka Ezekh
2016	Switzerland	**Binia Feltscher**; Irene Schori; Franziska Kaufmann; Christine Urech; Carole Howald	Japan	**Satsuki Fujisawa**; Chinami Yoshida; Yumi Suzuki; Yurika Yoshida; Mari Motohashi	Russia	**Anna Sidorova**; Margarita Fomina; Alexandra Raeva; Nkeirouka Ezekh; Alina Kovaleva
2017	Canada	**Rachel Homan**; Emma Miskew; Joanne Courtney; Lisa Weagle; Cheryl Kreviazuk	Russia	**Anna Sidorova**; Margarita Fomina; Alina Kovaleva; Nkeirouka Ezekh; Alexandra Raeva	Scotland	**Eve Muirhead**; Anna Sloan; Vicki Adams; Lauren Gray; Kelly Schafer
2018	Canada	**Jennifer Jones**; Kaitlyn Lawes; Jill Officer; Dawn McEwen; Shannon Birchard	Sweden	**Anna Hasselborg**; Sara McManus; Agnes Knochenhauer; Sofia Mabergs; Jennie Wåhlin	Russia	**Victoria Moiseeva**; Yulia Portunova; Galina Arsenkina; Julia Guzieva; Anna Sidorova
2019	Switzerland	Alina Pätz; **Silvana Tirinzoni**; Esther Neuenschwander; Melanie Barbezat; Marisa Winkelhausen	Sweden	**Anna Hasselborg**; Sara McManus; Agnes Knochenhauer; Sofia Mabergs; Johanna Heldin	South Korea	**Kim Min-ji**; Kim Hye-rin; Yang Tae-i; Kim Su-jin
2020	Cancelled					
2021	Switzerland	Alina Pätz; **Silvana Tirinzoni**; Esther Neuenschwander; Melanie Barbezat; Carole Howald	RCF	**Alina Kovaleva**; Yulia Portunova; Galina Arsenkina; Ekaterina Kuzmina; Maria Komarova	United States	**Tabitha Peterson**; Nina Roth; Becca Hamilton; Tara Peterson; Aileen Geving
2022	Switzerland	Alina Pätz; **Silvana Tirinzoni**; Esther Neuenschwander; Melanie Barbezat; Carole Howald	South Korea	**Kim Eun-jung**; Kim Kyeong-ae; Kim Cho-hi; Kim Seon-yeong; Kim Yeong-mi	Canada	**Kerri Einarson**; Val Sweeting; Shannon Birchard; Briane Meilleur; Krysten Karwacki
2023	Switzerland	Alina Pätz; **Silvana Tirinzoni**; Carole Howald; Briar Schwaller-Hürlimann	Norway	Kristin Skaslien; **Marianne Rørvik**; Mille Haslev Nordbye; Martine Rønning; Maia Ramsfjell	Canada	**Kerri Einarson**; Val Sweeting; Shannon Birchard; Briane Harris; Krysten Karwacki
2024	Canada	**Rachel Homan**; Tracy Fleury; Emma Miskew; Sarah Wilkes; Rachelle Brown	Switzerland	Alina Pätz; **Silvana Tirinzoni**; Selina Witschonke; Carole Howald; Stefanie Berset	South Korea	**Gim Eun-ji**; Kim Min-ji; Kim Su-ji; Seol Ye-eun; Seol Ye-ji
2025	Canada	**Rachel Homan**; Tracy Fleury; Emma Miskew; Sarah Wilkes; Rachelle Brown	Switzerland	Alina Pätz; **Silvana Tirinzoni**; Carole Howald; Selina Witschonke; Stefanie Berset	China	**Wang Rui**; Han Yu; Dong Ziqi; Jiang Jiayi; Su Tingyu
2026	Switzerland	**Xenia Schwaller**; Selina Gafner; Fabienne Rieder; Selina Rychiger	Canada	**Kerri Einarson**; Val Sweeting; Shannon Birchard; Karlee Burgess; Krysten Karwacki	Sweden	**Isabella Wranå**; Almida de Val; Maria Larsson; Linda Stenlund; Moa Dryburgh
2027						

== All-time medal table ==
As of 2026 World Women's Curling Championship

Rank	Nation	Gold	Silver	Bronze	Total
1	Canada	19	9	11	39
2	Switzerland	11	4	5	20
3	Sweden	8	10	8	26
4	Norway	2	5	7	14
5	Scotland	2	4	6	12
6	Germany	2	3	3	8
7	United States	1	5	1	7
8	Denmark	1	2	5	8
9	China	1	1	2	4
10	Russia	0	2	4	6
11	South Korea	0	1	2	3
12	Japan	0	1	0	1
Totals (12 entries)		**47**	**47**	**54**	**148**

== Performance timeline ==
Country	1970s	1980s										1990s										2000s										2010s										2020s							Years
Country	79	80	81	82	83	84	85	86	87	88	89	90	91	92	93	94	95	96	97	98	99	00	01	02	03	04	05	06	07	08	09	10	11	12	13	14	15	16	17	18	19	21	22	23	24	25	26	27	Years
Australia																																															13		1
Austria					10								9																																				2
Canada	3rd place, bronze medalist(s)	1st place, gold medalist(s)	2nd place, silver medalist(s)	5	3rd place, bronze medalist(s)	1st place, gold medalist(s)	1st place, gold medalist(s)	1st place, gold medalist(s)	1st place, gold medalist(s)	2nd place, silver medalist(s)	1st place, gold medalist(s)	3rd place, bronze medalist(s)	2nd place, silver medalist(s)	3rd place, bronze medalist(s)	1st place, gold medalist(s)	1st place, gold medalist(s)	2nd place, silver medalist(s)	1st place, gold medalist(s)	1st place, gold medalist(s)	3rd place, bronze medalist(s)	5	1st place, gold medalist(s)	1st place, gold medalist(s)	4	2nd place, silver medalist(s)	1st place, gold medalist(s)	4	3rd place, bronze medalist(s)	1st place, gold medalist(s)	1st place, gold medalist(s)	4	3rd place, bronze medalist(s)	2nd place, silver medalist(s)	3rd place, bronze medalist(s)	3rd place, bronze medalist(s)	2nd place, silver medalist(s)	2nd place, silver medalist(s)	4	1st place, gold medalist(s)	1st place, gold medalist(s)	8	5	3rd place, bronze medalist(s)	3rd place, bronze medalist(s)	1st place, gold medalist(s)	1st place, gold medalist(s)	2nd place, silver medalist(s)	Q	48
China																											7	5	7	2nd place, silver medalist(s)	1st place, gold medalist(s)	7	3rd place, bronze medalist(s)	11	9	7	5		11	7	6	10				3rd place, bronze medalist(s)	7	Q	18
Czech Republic																													11	12			12	12		9			7	6		12	12						9
Denmark	7	10	5	1st place, gold medalist(s)	7	5	6	8	7	5	8	3rd place, bronze medalist(s)	6	7		9	5	7	3rd place, bronze medalist(s)	2nd place, silver medalist(s)	3rd place, bronze medalist(s)	6	3rd place, bronze medalist(s)	6	8	8	10	6	2nd place, silver medalist(s)	5	3rd place, bronze medalist(s)	6	4	8	8	11	8	7	12	11	11	5	6	11	6	7	11	Q	47
England	11														9																																		2
Estonia																																										14			12				2
Finland									9	10	10			10	10	6		10	8	10	8					10	12										11	11			12								15
France	5	6		6	5	7	8	9	8	8	6	9	8				10					10																											14
Germany	8	9	9	9		3rd place, bronze medalist(s)	5	2nd place, silver medalist(s)	2nd place, silver medalist(s)	1st place, gold medalist(s)	3rd place, bronze medalist(s)	5	5	8	2nd place, silver medalist(s)	3rd place, bronze medalist(s)	4	4	6	5	5	6	5	9				4	8	9	6	1st place, gold medalist(s)	8	7	11	8	9	10	9	12	9	9	9	10					40
Italy	10	5	7	10	9	10	10																		9	9	11	9	12	11	12			10	10			12	10	13		13	10	5	4	10	8	Q	26
Japan												10		9	6	10	9	6	4	8	9	9	7		10	7	9	11	9	4		11			7		6	2nd place, silver medalist(s)		10	4	11	7	5	11	9	4	Q	30
Latvia																																12			12	12					13								4
Lithuania																																														13			1
Netherlands			10					10																				12																					3
New Zealand																																												13	13				2
Norway	9	7	3rd place, bronze medalist(s)	4	2nd place, silver medalist(s)	4	7	5	4	4	2nd place, silver medalist(s)	1st place, gold medalist(s)	1st place, gold medalist(s)	6	3rd place, bronze medalist(s)	5	3rd place, bronze medalist(s)	3rd place, bronze medalist(s)	2nd place, silver medalist(s)	4	4	3rd place, bronze medalist(s)	8	3rd place, bronze medalist(s)	4	2nd place, silver medalist(s)	3rd place, bronze medalist(s)	7			11	9	10				12						8	2nd place, silver medalist(s)	9	8	9	Q	38
Russia																							9	7	6		5		10	8	7	8	6	9	6	3rd place, bronze medalist(s)	3rd place, bronze medalist(s)	3rd place, bronze medalist(s)	2nd place, silver medalist(s)	3rd place, bronze medalist(s)	5	2nd place, silver medalist(s)							18
Scotland	3rd place, bronze medalist(s)	3rd place, bronze medalist(s)	6	3rd place, bronze medalist(s)	6	5	2nd place, silver medalist(s)	4	10	9	7	2nd place, silver medalist(s)	3rd place, bronze medalist(s)	5	5	2nd place, silver medalist(s)	7	5	8	7	10	4	4	1st place, gold medalist(s)	7	5	6	8	3rd place, bronze medalist(s)	10	8	2nd place, silver medalist(s)	9	6	1st place, gold medalist(s)	10	4	5	3rd place, bronze medalist(s)	9	10	8	13	12	8	6	10	Q	48
South Korea																								10							10		11	4		4		8	6	5	3rd place, bronze medalist(s)	7	2nd place, silver medalist(s)	9	3rd place, bronze medalist(s)	4	5	Q	16
Sweden	2nd place, silver medalist(s)	2nd place, silver medalist(s)	1st place, gold medalist(s)	2nd place, silver medalist(s)	4	7	4	3rd place, bronze medalist(s)	6	3rd place, bronze medalist(s)	3rd place, bronze medalist(s)	6	3rd place, bronze medalist(s)	1st place, gold medalist(s)	3rd place, bronze medalist(s)	3rd place, bronze medalist(s)	1st place, gold medalist(s)	7	5	1st place, gold medalist(s)	1st place, gold medalist(s)	5	2nd place, silver medalist(s)	2nd place, silver medalist(s)	3rd place, bronze medalist(s)	6	1st place, gold medalist(s)	1st place, gold medalist(s)	6	6	2nd place, silver medalist(s)	4	1st place, gold medalist(s)	2nd place, silver medalist(s)	2nd place, silver medalist(s)	5	7	9	4	2nd place, silver medalist(s)	2nd place, silver medalist(s)	4	4	4	5	5	3rd place, bronze medalist(s)	Q	48
Switzerland	1st place, gold medalist(s)	8	4	7	1st place, gold medalist(s)	2nd place, silver medalist(s)	3rd place, bronze medalist(s)	6	3rd place, bronze medalist(s)	6	5	7	7	3rd place, bronze medalist(s)	7	6	8	7	8	6	5	2nd place, silver medalist(s)	10	5	5	3rd place, bronze medalist(s)	8	10	5	3rd place, bronze medalist(s)	5	10	5	1st place, gold medalist(s)	5	1st place, gold medalist(s)	1st place, gold medalist(s)	1st place, gold medalist(s)	8	8	1st place, gold medalist(s)	1st place, gold medalist(s)	1st place, gold medalist(s)	1st place, gold medalist(s)	2nd place, silver medalist(s)	2nd place, silver medalist(s)	1st place, gold medalist(s)	Q	48
Turkey																																											11	8	10	11	5	Q	6
United States	5	4	8	8	8	9	9	7	5	7	9	8	10	2nd place, silver medalist(s)	8	6	6	2nd place, silver medalist(s)	7	9	2nd place, silver medalist(s)	6	6	8	1st place, gold medalist(s)	4	2nd place, silver medalist(s)	2nd place, silver medalist(s)	4	7	9	5	7	5	4	6	10	6	5	4	7	3rd place, bronze medalist(s)	5	7	7	12	12	Q	48

== Multiple gold medallists ==
As of 2026 World Women's Curling Championship

Including curlers with at least 3 gold medals.

No.	Curler	Country	Period (Note: Period from the first to the last medals won.)	Gold medal – first place	Silver medal – second place	Bronze medal – third place	Total
1	Alina Pätz	Switzerland	2012–2025	6	2	–	8
1	Carole Howald	Switzerland	2014–2025	6	2	–	8
3	Silvana Tirinzoni	Switzerland	2019–2025	4	2	–	6
3	Louise Marmont	Sweden	1988–1999	4	–	4	8
3	Elisabet Gustafson	Sweden	1992–1999	4	–	2	6
3	Katarina Nyberg	Sweden	1992–1999	4	–	2	6
3	Elisabeth Persson	Sweden	1992–1999	4	–	2	6
8	Anette Norberg	Sweden	1988–2011	3	2	4	9
8	Rachel Homan	Canada	2013–2025	3	1	1	5
8	Emma Miskew	Canada	2013–2025	3	1	1	5
8	Sandra Schmirler	Canada	1993–1997	3	–	–	3
8	Jan Betker	Canada	1993–1997	3	–	–	3
8	Joan McCusker	Canada	1993–1997	3	–	–	3
8	Marcia Gudereit	Canada	1993–1997	3	–	–	3
8	Esther Neuenschwander	Switzerland	2019–2022	3	–	–	3
8	Melanie Barbezat	Switzerland	2019–2022	3	–	–	3

== Multiple finalists ==
As of 2026 World Women's Curling Championship

Include curler with at least 4 final appearances.

No.	Curler	Country	Period	Gold medal – first place	Silver medal – second place	Final	Bronze medal – third place	Total
1	Alina Pätz	Switzerland	2012–2025	6	2	8	–	8
1	Carole Howald	Switzerland	2014–2025	6	2	8	–	8
3	Silvana Tirinzoni	Switzerland	2019–2025	4	2	6	–	6
4	Anette Norberg	Sweden	1988–2011	3	2	5	4	9
4	Dordi Nordby	Norway	1989–2005	2	3	5	6	11
6	Louise Marmont	Sweden	1988–1999	4	–	4	4	8
6	Elisabet Gustafson	Sweden	1992–1999	4	–	4	2	6
6	Katarina Nyberg	Sweden	1992–1999	4	–	4	2	6
6	Elisabeth Persson	Sweden	1992–1999	4	–	4	2	6
6	Rachel Homan	Canada	2013–2025	3	1	4	1	5
6	Emma Miskew	Canada	2013–2025	3	1	4	1	5
6	Hanne Woods	Norway	1989–2002	2	2	4	5	9
6	Cathrine Lindahl	Sweden	1991–2009	2	2	4	2	6
6	Andrea Schöpp	Germany	1986–2010	2	2	4	1	5
6	Monika Wagner	Germany	1986–2010	2	2	4	1	5
6	Eva Lund	Sweden	2001–2009	2	2	4	1	5
6	Allison Pottinger	United States	1996–2006	1	3	4	–	4
6	Maria Prytz	Sweden	2001–2013	–	4	4	1	5
6	Margaretha Sigfridsson	Sweden	2002–2013	–	4	4	–	4

== Multiple medallists ==
As of 2026 World Women's Curling Championship

Include curler with at least 6 medals of any colour.

No.	Curler	Country	Period	Gold medal – first place	Silver medal – second place	Bronze medal – third place	Total
1	Dordi Nordby	Norway	1989–2005	2	3	6	11
2	Anette Norberg	Sweden	1988–2011	3	2	4	9
2	Hanne Woods	Norway	1989–2002	2	2	5	9
4	Alina Pätz	Switzerland	2012–2025	6	2	–	8
4	Carole Howald	Switzerland	2014–2025	6	2	–	8
4	Louise Marmont	Sweden	1988–1999	4	–	4	8
7	Marianne Aspelin	Norway	1989–2000	1	2	4	7
8	Silvana Tirinzoni	Switzerland	2019–2025	4	2	–	6
8	Elisabet Gustafson	Sweden	1992–1999	4	–	2	6
8	Katarina Nyberg	Sweden	1992–1999	4	–	2	6
8	Elisabeth Persson	Sweden	1992–1999	4	–	2	6
8	Cathrine Lindahl	Sweden	1991–2009	2	2	2	6

== Records ==
Most championship titles
Curler	Country	No.	Years
Alina Pätz	Switzerland	6	2012, 2015, 2019, 2021–2023
Carole Howald	Switzerland	6	2014–2016, 2021–2023

Most championship finals
Curler	Country	No.	Years
Alina Pätz	Switzerland	8	2012, 2015, 2019, 2021–2025
Carole Howald	Switzerland	8	2014–2016, 2021–2025

Most championship medals
Curler	Country	No.	Years
Dordi Nordby	Norway	11	1989–1991, 1993, 1995–1997, 2000, 2002, 2004–2005

Most championship appearances
Curler	Country	No.	Years
Andrea Schöpp	Germany	19	1985–1989, 1991, 1995–1999, 2001, 2006–2011, 2013

Most titles at back-to-back events
Curler	Country	No.	Period
Alina Pätz	Switzerland	4	2019–2023
Silvana Tirinzoni	Switzerland	4	2019–2023

Most finals at back-to-back events
Curler	Country	No.	Period
Alina Pätz	Switzerland	6	2019–2025
Silvana Tirinzoni	Switzerland	6	2019–2025

Most medals at back-to-back events
Curler	Country	No.	Period
Alina Pätz	Switzerland	6	2019–2025
Silvana Tirinzoni	Switzerland	6	2019–2025

Most appearances at back-to-back events
Curler	Country	No.	Period
Dordi Nordby	Norway	12	1995–2006

Teams went undefeated in championship
Year	Country	Skip	Games played
2017	Canada	Rachel Homan	13
2018	Canada	Jennifer Jones	14
2022	Switzerland	Silvana Tirinzoni	14
2023	Switzerland	Silvana Tirinzoni	14

== See also ==
- List of World Men's Curling Champions
- World Mixed Doubles Curling Championship
- List of Olympic medalists in curling
- List of Paralympic medalists in wheelchair curling
- List of European Curling Champions
- Pan Continental Curling Championships
- List of World Junior Curling Champions
- Frances Brodie Award
- World Qualification Event

== Notes ==
- Bronze medals were only awarded from 1985. Table shows third-place finishers before then.
- 1979, 1989–94: Two bronze medals were awarded.
