= Frances Brodie Award =

Women's curling award

The Frances Brodie Award was created in honour of Frances Brodie, who started the first World Women's Curling Championship in 1979, and also presided over the Ladies Committee of the International Curling Federation, now known as the World Curling Federation. It is presented to the curler who best displayed skill, honesty, fair play, friendship and sportsmanship during the World Women's Curling Championships. The winner is selected by her fellow curlers in the tournament.

== Winners ==
Year	Winner	Country
1989	Cristina Lestander	Switzerland
1990	Almut Hege-Schöll	West Germany
1991	Veronika Huber	Austria
1992	Amy Hatten Wright	United States
1993	Jaana Jokela	Finland
1994	Helena Blach Lavrsen	Denmark
1995	Ayako Ishigaki	Japan
1996	Kirsty Hay	Scotland
1997	Jaana Jokela	Finland
1998	Jackie Lockhart	Scotland
1999	Marianne Aspelin	Norway
2000	Rhona Martin	Scotland
2001	Ann Swisshelm Silver	United States
2002	Kim Mi-yeon	South Korea
2003	Dordi Nordby	Norway
2004	Madeleine Dupont	Denmark
2005	Cassie Johnson	United States
2006	Junko Sonobe	Japan
2007	Lindsay Wood	Scotland
2008	Mirjam Ott	Switzerland
2009	Marianne Rørvik	Norway
2010	Linn Githmark	Norway
2011	Henriette Løvar	Norway
2012	Eve Muirhead	Scotland
2013	Corinna Scholz	Germany
2014	Alison Kreviazuk	Canada
2015	Sanna Puustinen	Finland
2016	Irene Schori	Switzerland
2017	Wang Bingyu	China
2018	Jill Officer	Canada
2019	Wang Rui	China
2021	Alina Pätz	Switzerland
2022	Alina Pätz	Switzerland
2023	Bridget Becker	New Zealand
2024	Angela Romei	Italy
2025	Alina Pätz	Switzerland
2026	Chinami Yoshida	Japan
2027		
