= Charlotte Hovring =

Norwegian curler

- Curler ♀
- Born: 3 September 1979 (age 47); Bærum, Norway

Team
- Curling club: Snarøen CC, Oslo

Curling career
- Member Association: Norway
- World Championship: 1 (2006)
- European Championship: 3 (2005, 2006, 2007)
- Olympic: 1 (2006)
- Other appearances: World Junior Championships: 2 (2000, 2001), Winter Universiade: 1 (2003)
Medal record
Curling
Norwegian Women's Championship
Silver medal – second place	2010
Winter Universiade
Bronze medal – third place	2003 Tarvisio

Charlotte Hovring (born 3 September 1979 in Bærum, Norway) is a Norwegian curler.

She participated in the 2006 Winter Olympics, where the Norwegian team finished in fourth place.

== Teams ==
Season	Skip	Third	Second	Lead	Alternate	Coach	Events
1999–00	Linn Githmark	Marianne Rørvik	Cathinka Ring Heger	Henriette Wang	Charlotte Hovring	Tormod Andreassen, Knut Ivar Moe	WJCC 2000 (8th)
2000–01	Linn Githmark	Marianne Rørvik	Henriette Wang	Cathinka Ring Heger	Charlotte Hovring	Tormod Andreassen	WJCC 2001 (8th)
2002–03	Linn Githmark	Marianne Rørvik	Charlotte Hovring	Henriette Wang			WUG 2003 (bronze)
2005–06	Dordi Nordby	Marianne Haslum	Marianne Rørvik	Camilla Holth	Charlotte Hovring	Sören Grahn	ECC 2005 (4th); WOG 2006 (4th)
2005–06	Dordi Nordby	Marianne Haslum	Charlotte Hovring	Camilla Holth	Kristin Skaslien	Ole Ingvaldsen	WCC 2006 (7th)
2006–07	Dordi Nordby	Marianne Rørvik	Charlotte Hovring	Camilla Holth	Kristin Skaslien	Torgeir Bryn	ECC 2006 (9th)
2007–08	Dordi Nordby	Marianne Rørvik	Charlotte Hovring	Ingrid Stensrud	Marte Bakk	Hanne Woods	ECC 2007 (14th)
2009–10	Marianne Rørvik (fourth)	Dordi Nordby (skip)	Charlotte Hovring	Camilla Holth			
2010–11	Marianne Rørvik (fourth)	Charlotte Hovring	Camilla Holth	Dordi Nordby (skip)			
2011–12	Marianne Rørvik	Anneline Skårsmoen	Kjersti Husby	Camilla Holth	Charlotte Hovring		
2012–13	Marianne Rørvik	Anneline Skårsmoen	Kjersti Husby	Camilla Holth	Charlotte Hovring		
