= 1998 World Women's Curling Championship =

- Host city: Kamloops, British Columbia
- Arena: Riverside Coliseum
- Dates: April 4–12, 1998
- Winner: Sweden
- Curling club: Umeå CK
- Skip: Elisabet Gustafson
- Third: Katarina Nyberg
- Second: Louise Marmont
- Lead: Elisabeth Persson
- Alternate: Margaretha Lindahl
- Coach: Jan Strandlund
- Finalist: Denmark (Helena Blach Lavrsen)

The 1998 World Women's Curling Championship (branded as 1998 Ford World Women's Curling Championship for sponsorship reasons) was held at Riverside Coliseum in Kamloops, British Columbia from April 4–12, 1998.

== Teams ==
Canada	Denmark	Finland	Germany	Japan
Ottewell CC, Edmonton, Alberta Skip: Cathy Borst; Third: Heather Godberson; Second: Brenda Bohmer; Lead: Kate Horne; Alternate: Rona McGregor	Hvidovre CC, Hvidovre Skip: Helena Blach Lavrsen; Third: Margit Pörtner; Second: Dorthe Holm; Lead: Lisa Richardson; Alternate: Trine Qvist	Hyvinkää CC, Hyvinkää Fourth: Anne Eerikäinen; Skip: Jaana Jokela; Second: Nina Pöllänen; Lead: Laura Franssila; Alternate: Tiina Kautonen	SC Riessersee, Garmisch-Partenkirchen Skip: Andrea Schöpp; Third: Natalie Neßler; Second: Heike Wieländer; Lead: Jane Boake-Cope; Alternate: Andrea Stock	Obihiro & Tokoro CC Skip: Mayumi Ohkutsu; Third: Akiko Katoh; Second: Yukari Kondo; Lead: Yoko Mimura; Alternate: Akemi Niwa
Norway	Scotland	Sweden	Switzerland	United States
Snarøen CC, Oslo Skip: Dordi Nordby; Third: Hanne Woods; Second: Marianne Haslum; Lead: Kristin Løvseth; Alternate: Marianne Aspelin	Airleywight Ladies CC, Perth Skip: Kirsty Hay; Third: Edith Loudon; Second: Jackie Lockhart; Lead: Katie Loudon; Alternate: Fiona Bayne	Umeå CK, Umeå Skip: Elisabet Gustafson; Third: Katarina Nyberg; Second: Louise Marmont; Lead: Elisabeth Persson; Alternate: Margaretha Lindahl	Zug CC, Zug Skip: Cristina Lestander; Third: Selina Breuleux; Second: Madlaina Breuleux; Lead: Annick Lusser; Alternate: Sandra Arnold	Bemidji CC, Bemidji, Minnesota Skip: Kari Erickson; Third: Lori Kreklau; Second: Stacey Liapis; Lead: Ann Swisshelm; Alternate: Risa O'Connell

== Round-robin standings ==
Country	Skip	W	L
Sweden	Elisabet Gustafson	8	1
Norway	Dordi Nordby	6	3
Denmark	Helena Blach Lavrsen	6	3
Canada	Cathy Borst	6	3
Germany	Andrea Schöpp	5	4
Switzerland	Cristina Lestander	4	5
Scotland	Kirsty Hay	4	5
Japan	Mayumi Ohkutsu	2	7
United States	Kari Erickson	2	7
Finland	Jaana Jokela	2	7

== Round-robin results ==
=== Draw 1 ===
Sheet A	Final
Sweden (Gustafson)	7
Switzerland (Lestander)	5

Sheet B	Final
Denmark (Lavrsen)	12
Canada (Borst)	3

Sheet C	Final
United States (Erickson)	5
Scotland (Hay)	9

Sheet D	Final
Norway (Nordby)	6
Finland (Jokela)	4

Sheet E	Final
Germany (Schöpp)	3
Japan (Mayumi)	2

=== Draw 2 ===
Sheet A	Final
United States (Erickson)	3
Canada (Borst)	11

Sheet B	Final
Finland (Jokela)	3
Germany (Schöpp)	4

Sheet C	Final
Japan (Mayumi)	6
Denmark (Lavrsen)	7

Sheet D	Final
Scotland (Hay)	3
Sweden (Gustafson)	8

Sheet E	Final
Switzerland (Lestander)	11
Norway (Nordby)	5

=== Draw 3 ===
Sheet A	Final
Germany (Schöpp)	9
Scotland (Hay)	1

Sheet B	Final
Norway (Nordby)	10
Japan (Mayumi)	4

Sheet C	Final
Finland (Jokela)	5
Canada (Borst)	6

Sheet D	Final
Switzerland (Lestander)	6
Denmark (Lavrsen)	9

Sheet E	Final
United States (Erickson)	6
Sweden (Gustafson)	8

=== Draw 4 ===
Sheet A	Final
Japan (Mayumi)	3
Canada (Borst)	6

Sheet B	Final
Sweden (Gustafson)	3
Denmark (Lavrsen)	7

Sheet C	Final
Switzerland (Lestander)	6
Germany (Schöpp)	0

Sheet D	Final
Switzerland (Lestander)	5
Germany (Schöpp)	7

Sheet E	Final
Finland (Jokela)	7
Scotland (Hay)	4

=== Draw 5 ===
Sheet A	Final
United States (Erickson)	8
Finland (Jokela)	4

Sheet B	Final
Canada (Borst)	8
Switzerland (Lestander)	5

Sheet C	Final
Norway (Nordby)	4
Scotland (Hay)	9

Sheet D	Final
Denmark (Lavrsen)	8
Germany (Schöpp)	2

Sheet E	Final
Sweden (Gustafson)	7
Japan (Mayumi)	5

=== Draw 6 ===
Sheet A	Final
Denmark (Lavrsen)	3
Norway (Nordby)	9

Sheet B	Final
Sweden (Gustafson)	7
Finland (Jokela)	2

Sheet C	Final
Japan (Mayumi)	3
Switzerland (Lestander)	5

Sheet D	Final
Canada (Borst)	8
Scotland (Hay)	2

Sheet E	Final
Germany (Schöpp)	8
United States (Erickson)	6

=== Draw 7 ===
Sheet A	Final
Switzerland (Lestander)	10
Scotland (Hay)	5

Sheet B	Final
Germany (Schöpp)	4
Norway (Nordby)	6

Sheet C	Final
Canada (Borst)	3
Sweden (Gustafson)	5

Sheet D	Final
Japan (Mayumi)	9
United States (Erickson)	3

Sheet E	Final
Denmark (Lavrsen)	2
Finland (Jokela)	10

=== Draw 8 ===
Sheet A	Final
Germany (Schöpp)	6
Sweden (Gustafson)	7

Sheet B	Final
Japan (Mayumi)	6
Scotland (Hay)	8

Sheet C	Final
United States (Erickson)	7
Denmark (Lavrsen)	6

Sheet D	Final
Finland (Jokela)	5
Switzerland (Lestander)	4

Sheet E	Final
Norway (Nordby)	8
Canada (Borst)	7

=== Draw 9 ===
Sheet A	Final
Finland (Jokela)	6
Japan (Mayumi)	7

Sheet B	Final
Switzerland (Lestander)	6
United States (Erickson)	5

Sheet C	Final
Sweden (Gustafson)	5
Norway (Nordby)	4

Sheet D	Final
Germany (Schöpp)	5
Canada (Borst)	6

Sheet E	Final
Scotland (Hay)	8
Denmark (Lavrsen)	3

== Playoffs ==
=== Brackets ===
Semi-final
1	Sweden	8
4	Canada	7
2	Norway	4
3	Denmark	6

Final
1	Sweden	7
3	Denmark	3
Bronze medal
2	Norway	2
4	Canada	10

=== Final ===
Sheet A	1	2	3	4	5	6	7	8	9	10	Final
Denmark (Lavrsen)	0	0	0	1	0	1	0	0	1	X	3
Sweden (Gustafson)	0	1	0	0	1	0	4	1	0	X	7
