= 1999 World Women's Curling Championship =

- Host city: Saint John, New Brunswick
- Arena: Harbour Station
- Dates: April 3–10, 1999
- Attendance: 96,429 (combined men's and women's)
- Winner: Sweden
- Curling club: Umeå CK
- Skip: Elisabet Gustafson
- Third: Katarina Nyberg
- Second: Louise Marmont
- Lead: Elisabeth Persson
- Alternate: Margaretha Lindahl
- Coach: Mikael Hasselborg
- Finalist: United States (Patti Lank)

The 1999 World Women's Curling Championship (branded as 1999 Ford World Women's Curling Championship for sponsorship reasons) was held at Harbour Station in Saint John, New Brunswick from April 3–10, 1999. The event was held in conjunction with the 1999 World Men's Curling Championship. It was the first Women's World Championship to be held in Atlantic Canada.

Elisabet Gustafson, skip of Team Sweden won a record fourth Women's World Championship (breaking a tie with Canada's Sandra Schmirler). Sweden beat the United States (skipped by Patti Lank) in the final, 8–5. The turning point in the game came in the eighth end when the U.S. made some "crucial mistakes" leading to a steal of four for Sweden. At the time, the game was tied at four. Gustafson cut of Lank's ability to draw to the button, and Lank came up short on her last rock, an attempted draw to bite the eight-foot. She had to throw the rock wide into an "ever-building frost layer on the edge of the ice", and did not make the rings. Lank believed her rock may have picked as "it just went sideways". Lank could have made a hit through a narrow port instead, but opted for the draw as she prefers to throw draws. Gustafson was pregnant at the time, expecting to give birth in July. It would be Gustafson's last World Championship gold medal, as she would retire from competitive curling after a disappointing showing at the 2002 Winter Olympics.

Denmark, skipped by Lene Bidstrup defeated Norway's Dordi Nordby in the bronze medal game, 8–7.

Games were televised in Canada on TSN with the finals on CBC. The playoffs were also shown on Eurosport for the first time, as interest in curling began to rise due to its inclusion in the 1998 Winter Olympics.

== Teams ==
Canada	Denmark	Finland	Germany	Japan
Mayflower CC, Halifax Skip: Colleen Jones; Third: Kim Kelly; Second: Mary-Anne Waye; Lead: Nancy Delahunt; Alternate: Laine Peters	Hvidovre CC, Hvidovre Skip: Lene Bidstrup; Third: Malene Krause; Second: Susanne Slotsager; Lead: Avijaja Petri; Alternate: Lilian Frøhling	Hyvinkää CC, Hyvinkää Skip: Anne Eerikäinen; Third: Tiina Kautonen; Second: Jaana Hämäläinen; Lead: Jaana Jokela; Alternate: Minna Malinen	SC Riessersee, Garmisch-Partenkirchen Skip: Andrea Schöpp; Third: Natalie Neßler; Second: Heike Wieländer; Lead: Jane Boake-Cope; Alternate: Andrea Stock	Tokoro CC, Tokoro Skip: Akiko Katoh; Third: Akemi Niwa; Second: Ayumi Onodera; Lead: Mika Hori; Alternate: Yumie Hayashi
Norway	Scotland	Sweden	Switzerland	United States
Snarøen CC, Snarøya Skip: Dordi Nordby; Third: Hanne Woods; Second: Marianne Haslum; Lead: Kristin Tøsse Løvseth; Alternate: Marianne Aspelin	Greenacres CC, Howwood Skip: Deborah Knox; Third: Isobel Hannen; Second: Wendy Bell; Lead: Judith Stobbie; Alternate: Anne Laird	Umeå CK, Umeå Skip: Elisabet Gustafson; Third: Katarina Nyberg; Second: Louise Marmont; Lead: Elisabeth Persson; Alternate: Margaretha Lindahl	Bern CC, Bern Skip: Luzia Ebnöther; Third: Nicole Strausak; Second: Tanya Frei; Lead: Nadia Raspe; Alternate: Andrea Stöckli	Madison CC, McFarland Skip: Patti Lank; Third: Erika Brown; Second: Allison Darragh; Lead: Tracy Sachtjen; Alternate: Barb Perrella

== Round robin standings ==
Country	Skip	W	L
Sweden	Elisabet Gustafson	8	1
Norway	Dordi Nordby	7	2
United States	Patti Lank	6	3
Denmark	Lene Bidstrup	5	4
Canada	Colleen Jones	4	5
Germany	Andrea Schöpp	4	5
Switzerland	Luzia Ebnöther	4	5
Finland	Anne Eerikäinen	3	6
Japan	Akiko Katoh	3	6
Scotland	Debbie Knox	1	8

== Round robin results ==
=== Draw 1 ===
Sheet A	1	2	3	4	5	6	7	8	9	10	Final
Canada (Jones)	0	1	0	0	2	0	0	1	0	0	4
Switzerland (Ebnöther)	0	0	0	1	0	1	0	0	1	0	3

Sheet B	1	2	3	4	5	6	7	8	9	10	Final
Scotland (Knox)	0	1	2	0	0	1	0	1	1	0	6
Germany (Schöpp)	2	0	0	3	2	0	1	0	0	1	9

Sheet C	1	2	3	4	5	6	7	8	9	10	Final
Japan (Katoh)	0	0	2	0	0	0	1	2	0	0	5
Denmark (Bidstrup)	0	0	0	3	1	1	0	0	0	1	6

Sheet D	1	2	3	4	5	6	7	8	9	10	Final
Norway (Nordby)	0	1	0	1	0	0	0	2	0	X	4
Sweden (Gustafson)	0	0	2	0	1	2	1	0	1	X	7

Sheet E	1	2	3	4	5	6	7	8	9	10	Final
Finland (Eerikäinen)	0	1	0	2	0	0	0	0	X	X	3
United States (Lank)	1	0	1	0	0	2	2	3	X	X	9

=== Draw 2 ===
Sheet A	1	2	3	4	5	6	7	8	9	10	11	Final
Sweden (Gustafson)	1	0	0	0	1	0	2	0	0	1	3	8
Germany (Schöpp)	0	1	0	1	0	1	0	0	2	0	0	5

Sheet B	1	2	3	4	5	6	7	8	9	10	Final
United States (Lank)	3	0	2	1	0	1	1	0	1	X	9
Japan (Katoh)	0	2	0	0	1	0	0	1	0	X	4

Sheet C	1	2	3	4	5	6	7	8	9	10	Final
Canada (Jones)	0	1	0	1	0	0	2	1	0	2	7
Scotland (Knox)	1	0	1	0	1	1	0	0	2	0	6

Sheet D	1	2	3	4	5	6	7	8	9	10	Final
Denmark (Bidstrup)	0	2	0	2	0	1	0	2	3	X	10
Finland (Eerikäinen)	1	0	1	0	1	0	1	0	0	X	4

Sheet E	1	2	3	4	5	6	7	8	9	10	11	Final
Switzerland (Ebnöther)	0	1	0	2	1	0	1	0	1	1	0	7
Norway (Nordby)	1	0	3	0	0	1	0	2	0	0	1	8

=== Draw 3 ===
Sheet A	1	2	3	4	5	6	7	8	9	10	Final
Japan (Katoh)	1	0	1	2	0	2	0	0	0	3	9
Canada (Jones)	0	1	0	0	2	0	0	2	0	0	5

Sheet B	1	2	3	4	5	6	7	8	9	10	11	Final
Denmark (Bidstrup)	2	0	1	0	0	1	1	0	1	0	1	7
Norway (Nordby)	0	1	0	1	1	0	0	2	0	1	0	6

Sheet C	1	2	3	4	5	6	7	8	9	10	11	Final
Germany (Schöpp)	0	0	0	3	0	0	1	1	0	2	0	7
Finland (Eerikäinen)	0	0	2	0	2	1	0	0	2	0	1	8

Sheet D	1	2	3	4	5	6	7	8	9	10	Final
United States (Lank)	1	0	2	0	4	0	2	1	3	X	13
Switzerland (Ebnöther)	0	2	0	2	0	2	0	0	0	X	6

Sheet E	1	2	3	4	5	6	7	8	9	10	Final
Scotland (Knox)	0	1	0	0	2	0	0	1	0	X	4
Sweden (Gustafson)	0	0	2	1	0	2	1	0	3	X	9

=== Draw 4 ===
Sheet A	1	2	3	4	5	6	7	8	9	10	Final
Switzerland (Ebnöther)	1	0	0	3	0	2	3	2	X	X	11
Scotland (Knox)	0	2	1	0	2	0	0	0	X	X	5

Sheet B	1	2	3	4	5	6	7	8	9	10	Final
Finland (Eerikäinen)	1	0	0	0	0	1	0	0	0	X	2
Canada (Jones)	0	2	1	0	1	0	2	1	1	X	8

Sheet C	1	2	3	4	5	6	7	8	9	10	Final
Sweden (Gustafson)	1	0	0	2	0	2	0	1	0	X	6
United States (Lank)	0	1	2	0	2	0	2	0	2	X	9

Sheet D	1	2	3	4	5	6	7	8	9	10	Final
Germany (Schöpp)	5	5	2	0	2	0	X	X	X	X	14
Denmark (Bidstrup)	0	0	0	2	0	1	X	X	X	X	3

Sheet E	1	2	3	4	5	6	7	8	9	10	Final
Norway (Nordby)	1	1	2	0	2	0	3	0	0	X	8
Japan (Katoh)	0	0	0	1	0	1	0	1	1	X	4

=== Draw 5 ===
Sheet A	1	2	3	4	5	6	7	8	9	10	Final
Denmark (Bidstrup)	1	0	0	2	0	0	1	1	0	X	5
United States (Lank)	0	1	1	0	4	1	0	0	2	X	9

Sheet B	1	2	3	4	5	6	7	8	9	10	Final
Norway (Nordby)	0	1	0	2	2	0	2	4	X	X	11
Scotland (Knox)	1	0	1	0	0	2	0	0	X	X	4

Sheet C	1	2	3	4	5	6	7	8	9	10	Final
Finland (Eerikäinen)	1	3	0	1	2	0	0	0	1	X	8
Japan (Katoh)	0	0	1	0	0	0	1	2	0	X	4

Sheet D	1	2	3	4	5	6	7	8	9	10	Final
Sweden (Gustafson)	0	0	1	0	2	0	3	0	1	X	7
Canada (Jones)	0	0	0	1	0	1	0	1	0	X	3

Sheet E	1	2	3	4	5	6	7	8	9	10	Final
Germany (Schöpp)	0	0	0	0	1	0	1	1	1	0	4
Switzerland (Ebnöther)	0	2	0	0	0	3	0	0	0	2	7

=== Draw 6 ===
Sheet A	1	2	3	4	5	6	7	8	9	10	Final
Finland (Eerikäinen)	0	0	0	0	0	0	0	X	X	X	0
Sweden (Gustafson)	0	1	1	1	1	2	2	X	X	X	8

Sheet B	1	2	3	4	5	6	7	8	9	10	Final
Germany (Schöpp)	0	1	2	1	3	0	0	2	0	X	9
United States (Lank)	3	0	0	0	0	1	1	0	1	X	6

Sheet C	1	2	3	4	5	6	7	8	9	10	Final
Norway (Nordby)	1	0	0	2	1	0	0	2	0	X	6
Canada (Jones)	0	0	2	0	0	1	0	0	1	X	4

Sheet D	1	2	3	4	5	6	7	8	9	10	Final
Switzerland (Ebnöther)	1	1	1	1	0	3	1	0	1	X	9
Japan (Katoh)	0	0	0	0	1	0	0	3	0	X	4

Sheet E	1	2	3	4	5	6	7	8	9	10	Final
Denmark (Bidstrup)	0	2	2	3	1	1	1	X	X	X	10
Scotland (Knox)	1	0	0	0	0	0	0	X	X	X	1

=== Draw 7 ===
Sheet A	1	2	3	4	5	6	7	8	9	10	Final
Germany (Schöpp)	0	1	1	0	1	0	3	0	1	0	7
Norway (Nordby)	1	0	0	5	0	1	0	1	0	1	9

Sheet B	1	2	3	4	5	6	7	8	9	10	Final
Japan (Katoh)	0	0	0	0	0	0	X	X	X	X	0
Sweden (Gustafson)	3	2	1	2	1	3	X	X	X	X	12

Sheet C	1	2	3	4	5	6	7	8	9	10	Final
Denmark (Bidstrup)	1	1	0	1	0	0	3	1	0	X	7
Switzerland (Ebnöther)	0	0	2	0	2	0	0	0	2	X	6

Sheet D	1	2	3	4	5	6	7	8	9	10	11	Final
Finland (Eerikäinen)	0	1	0	1	1	0	0	2	1	0	1	7
Scotland (Knox)	1	0	1	0	0	1	2	0	0	1	0	6

Sheet E	1	2	3	4	5	6	7	8	9	10	Final
United States (Lank)	0	2	2	1	0	2	0	1	2	X	10
Canada (Jones)	1	0	0	0	1	0	4	0	0	X	6

=== Draw 8 ===
Sheet A	1	2	3	4	5	6	7	8	9	10	Final
Scotland (Knox)	0	0	0	2	0	0	0	0	X	X	2
Japan (Katoh)	2	0	2	0	1	2	1	2	X	X	10

Sheet B	1	2	3	4	5	6	7	8	9	10	Final
Switzerland (Ebnöther)	1	0	1	0	2	0	1	1	0	X	6
Finland (Eerikäinen)	0	0	0	1	0	2	0	0	1	X	4

Sheet C	1	2	3	4	5	6	7	8	9	10	Final
United States (Lank)	0	0	1	0	3	0	1	0	1	0	6
Norway (Nordby)	1	0	0	2	0	2	0	1	0	1	7

Sheet D	1	2	3	4	5	6	7	8	9	10	Final
Canada (Jones)	1	0	2	0	0	0	0	2	0	0	5
Germany (Schöpp)	0	3	0	0	0	0	2	0	1	2	8

Sheet E	1	2	3	4	5	6	7	8	9	10	Final
Sweden (Gustafson)	0	2	0	7	0	3	X	X	X	X	12
Denmark (Bidstrup)	1	0	1	0	1	0	X	X	X	X	3

=== Draw 9 ===
Sheet A	1	2	3	4	5	6	7	8	9	10	Final
Norway (Nordby)	0	0	0	3	0	2	1	3	X	X	9
Finland (Eerikäinen)	0	1	0	0	2	0	0	0	X	X	3

Sheet B	1	2	3	4	5	6	7	8	9	10	Final
Canada (Jones)	0	2	1	2	0	2	0	2	0	X	9
Denmark (Bidstrup)	1	0	0	0	1	0	2	0	1	X	5

Sheet C	1	2	3	4	5	6	7	8	9	10	Final
Switzerland (Ebnöther)	1	0	1	0	0	0	1	0	2	0	5
Sweden (Gustafson)	0	0	0	0	1	1	0	2	0	3	7

Sheet D	1	2	3	4	5	6	7	8	9	10	11	Final
Scotland (Knox)	3	1	0	2	2	0	0	0	2	0	2	12
United States (Lank)	0	0	4	0	0	2	0	2	0	2	0	10

Sheet E	1	2	3	4	5	6	7	8	9	10	Final
Japan (Katoh)	0	2	0	0	2	0	5	0	0	0	9
Germany (Schöpp)	0	0	2	1	0	2	0	1	1	1	8

== Playoffs ==
=== Brackets ===
Semi-final
1	Sweden	8
4	Denmark	7
2	Norway	6
3	United States	7

Final
1	Sweden	8
3	United States	5
Bronze medal
2	Norway	7
4	Denmark	8

=== Semifinal ===
Team	1	2	3	4	5	6	7	8	9	10	Final
United States (Lank)	2	0	0	0	0	3	0	0	2	0	7
Norway (Nordby)	0	0	0	1	1	0	2	1	0	1	6

Team	1	2	3	4	5	6	7	8	9	10	Final
Sweden (Gustafson)	0	1	0	4	0	0	0	2	0	1	8
Denmark (Bidstrup)	0	0	2	0	3	1	0	0	1	0	7

=== Bronze medal game ===
Team	1	2	3	4	5	6	7	8	9	10	Final
Norway (Nordby)	0	0	0	0	0	2	0	3	2	0	7
Denmark (Bidstrup)	1	1	1	1	1	0	2	0	0	1	8

=== Final ===
Sheet A	1	2	3	4	5	6	7	8	9	10	Final
United States (Lank)	1	0	2	0	1	0	0	0	1	X	5
Sweden (Gustafson)	0	2	0	1	0	0	1	4	0	X	8
