= 2003 World Women's Curling Championship =

- Host city: Winnipeg, Manitoba, Canada
- Arena: Winnipeg Arena
- Dates: April 5–13, 2003
- Winner: United States
- Curling club: Madison CC, Madison, Wisconsin
- Skip: Debbie McCormick
- Third: Allison Pottinger
- Second: Ann Swisshelm Silver
- Lead: Tracy Sachtjen
- Alternate: Joni Cotten
- Coach: Wally Henry
- Finalist: Canada (Colleen Jones)

The 2003 World Women's Curling Championship (branded as 2003 Ford World Women's Curling Championship for sponsorship reasons) was held at the Winnipeg Arena in Winnipeg, Manitoba, Canada from April 5–13, 2003.

== Teams ==
Canada	Denmark	Italy	Japan	Norway
Mayflower CC, Halifax, Nova Scotia Skip: Colleen Jones; Third: Kim Kelly; Second: Mary-Anne Waye; Lead: Nancy Delahunt; Alternate: Laine Peters	Hvidovre CC, Hvidovre Skip: Dorthe Holm; Third: Malene Krause; Second: Denise Dupont; Lead: Lisa Richardson; Alternate: Maria Poulsen	New Wave CC, Cortina d'Ampezzo Skip: Diana Gaspari; Third: Giulia Lacedelli; Second: Rosa Pompanin; Lead: Violetta Caldart; Alternate: Arianna Lorenzi	Kitami CC, Kitami Skip: Shinobu Aota; Third: Yukari Okazaki; Second: Eriko Minatoya; Lead: Kotomi Ishizaki; Alternate: Satomi Tsujii	Snarøen CC, Oslo Skip: Dordi Nordby; Third: Hanne Woods; Second: Marianne Haslum; Lead: Camilla Holth
Russia	Scotland	Sweden	Switzerland	United States
Moskvitch CC, Moscow Skip: Olga Jarkova; Third: Nkeiruka Ezekh; Second: Yana Nekrasova; Lead: Anastassia Skoultan; Alternate: Ludmila Privivkova	Airleywight Ladies CC, Perth Skip: Edith Loudon; Third: Karen Addison; Second: Lynn Cameron; Lead: Katie Loudon; Alternate: Jackie Lockhart	Härnösands CK, Härnösand Skip: Anette Norberg; Third: Eva Lund; Second: Cathrine Norberg; Lead: Helena Lingham; Alternate: Maria Prytz	CC Bern, Bern Fourth: Selina Breuleux; Skip: Nicole Strausak; Second: Madlaina Breuleux; Lead: Bianca Röthlisberger; Alternate: Carine Mattille	Madison CC, McFarland, Wisconsin Skip: Debbie McCormick; Third: Allison Pottinger; Second: Ann Swisshelm Silver; Lead: Tracy Sachtjen; Alternate: Joni Cotten

== Round-robin standings ==
Country	Skip	W	L
Canada	Colleen Jones	9	0
Sweden	Anette Norberg	7	2
United States	Debbie McCormick	5	4
Norway	Dordi Nordby	5	4
Switzerland	Nicole Strausak	4	5
Russia	Olga Jarkova	3	6
Scotland	Edith Loudon	3	6
Denmark	Dorthe Holm	3	6
Italy	Diana Gaspari	3	6
Japan	Shinobu Aota	3	6

== Round-robin results ==
=== Draw 1 ===
April 5, 2003 08:00

Sheet A	1	2	3	4	5	6	7	8	9	10	Final
Norway (Nordby) 🔨	1	0	0	2	0	4	1	2	X	X	10
Denmark (Holm)	0	1	1	0	1	0	0	0	X	X	3

Sheet B	1	2	3	4	5	6	7	8	9	10	Final
Italy (Gaspari)	0	1	0	0	0	0	3	1	0	0	5
United States (McCormick) 🔨	1	0	1	1	1	1	0	0	1	2	8

Sheet C	1	2	3	4	5	6	7	8	9	10	Final
Sweden (Norberg) 🔨	0	1	0	0	2	0	0	0	X	X	3
Switzerland (Strausak)	0	0	3	3	0	1	1	2	X	X	10

Sheet D	1	2	3	4	5	6	7	8	9	10	Final
Canada (Jones)	0	1	2	0	1	0	3	0	1	1	9
Russia (Jarkova) 🔨	0	0	0	2	0	1	0	1	0	0	4

Sheet E	1	2	3	4	5	6	7	8	9	10	Final
Japan (Aota) 🔨	0	0	3	1	0	1	0	0	0	3	8
Scotland (Loudon)	0	1	0	0	1	0	0	1	1	0	4

=== Draw 2 ===
April 5, 2003 18:00

Sheet A	1	2	3	4	5	6	7	8	9	10	Final
Japan (Aota) 🔨	0	0	0	0	2	0	2	1	0	0	5
Italy (Gaspari)	0	1	0	2	0	1	0	0	2	1	7

Sheet B	1	2	3	4	5	6	7	8	9	10	Final
Switzerland (Strausak) 🔨	2	0	2	0	2	0	0	4	X	X	10
Scotland (Loudon)	0	1	0	1	0	1	1	0	X	X	4

Sheet C	1	2	3	4	5	6	7	8	9	10	Final
Norway (Nordby) 🔨	1	0	0	1	0	0	0	1	0	0	3
Canada (Jones)	0	2	1	0	1	1	1	0	1	1	8

Sheet D	1	2	3	4	5	6	7	8	9	10	Final
Sweden (Norberg) 🔨	1	0	1	2	0	2	2	0	1	0	9
Denmark (Holm)	0	3	0	0	1	0	0	1	0	1	6

Sheet E	1	2	3	4	5	6	7	8	9	10	11	Final
United States (McCormick) 🔨	1	0	0	0	3	0	0	2	0	0	1	7
Russia (Jarkova)	0	1	1	1	0	0	1	0	1	1	0	6

=== Draw 3 ===
April 6, 2003 13:00

Sheet A	1	2	3	4	5	6	7	8	9	10	Final
Russia (Jarkova) 🔨	0	0	1	0	1	1	1	1	0	2	7
Scotland (Loudon)	1	2	0	1	0	0	0	0	2	0	6

Sheet B	1	2	3	4	5	6	7	8	9	10	Final
Denmark (Holm) 🔨	1	0	1	0	0	3	0	2	0	0	7
Canada (Jones)	0	1	0	2	1	0	4	0	2	3	13

Sheet C	1	2	3	4	5	6	7	8	9	10	Final
United States (McCormick)	0	2	0	1	0	1	0	2	0	0	6
Japan (Aota) 🔨	1	0	1	0	1	0	1	0	2	1	7

Sheet D	1	2	3	4	5	6	7	8	9	10	Final
Switzerland (Strausak) 🔨	1	0	0	0	0	2	0	0	2	0	5
Norway (Nordby)	0	2	0	1	1	0	0	2	0	3	9

Sheet E	1	2	3	4	5	6	7	8	9	10	Final
Sweden (Norberg)	0	2	4	0	0	1	6	X	X	X	13
Italy (Gaspari) 🔨	0	0	0	3	1	0	0	X	X	X	4

=== Draw 4 ===
April 7, 2003 08:00

Sheet A	1	2	3	4	5	6	7	8	9	10	Final
Denmark (Holm)	0	1	0	2	0	3	0	2	0	1	9
United States (McCormick) 🔨	1	0	1	0	2	0	1	0	1	0	6

Sheet B	1	2	3	4	5	6	7	8	9	10	Final
Sweden (Norberg)	0	0	1	0	3	1	0	2	1	X	8
Norway (Nordby) 🔨	0	1	0	1	0	0	1	0	0	X	3

Sheet C	1	2	3	4	5	6	7	8	9	10	Final
Italy (Gaspari)	0	0	2	0	1	0	0	0	X	X	3
Scotland (Loudon) 🔨	1	1	0	2	0	1	1	4	X	X	10

Sheet D	1	2	3	4	5	6	7	8	9	10	Final
Russia (Jarkova) 🔨	0	0	0	2	0	0	0	2	0	2	6
Japan (Aota)	0	0	0	0	3	0	0	0	2	0	5

Sheet E	1	2	3	4	5	6	7	8	9	10	Final
Canada (Jones) 🔨	2	0	1	0	2	0	0	0	0	0	5
Switzerland (Strausak)	0	0	0	1	0	0	1	0	1	1	4

=== Draw 5 ===
April 7, 2003 18:00

Sheet A	1	2	3	4	5	6	7	8	9	10	Final
Sweden (Norberg) 🔨	2	0	3	0	0	0	3	0	0	0	8
Japan (Aota)	0	1	0	1	0	0	0	1	2	0	5

Sheet B	1	2	3	4	5	6	7	8	9	10	11	Final
United States (McCormick)	0	1	0	2	0	0	2	0	0	2	1	8
Switzerland (Strausak) 🔨	1	0	1	0	0	2	0	2	1	0	0	7

Sheet C	1	2	3	4	5	6	7	8	9	10	Final
Denmark (Holm) 🔨	0	1	0	2	0	0	0	2	0	X	5
Russia (Jarkova)	0	0	4	0	0	3	1	0	2	X	10

Sheet D	1	2	3	4	5	6	7	8	9	10	11	Final
Italy (Gaspari) 🔨	1	1	0	4	0	0	0	2	0	1	0	9
Canada (Jones)	0	0	1	0	2	1	3	0	2	0	1	10

Sheet E	1	2	3	4	5	6	7	8	9	10	Final
Scotland (Loudon) 🔨	2	0	1	2	0	1	0	5	X	X	11
Norway (Nordby)	0	1	0	0	1	0	1	0	X	X	3

=== Draw 6 ===
April 8, 2003 13:00

Sheet A	1	2	3	4	5	6	7	8	9	10	Final
Scotland (Loudon)	1	3	0	0	0	0	1	0	1	0	6
Canada (Jones) 🔨	0	0	1	2	1	0	0	2	0	1	7

Sheet B	1	2	3	4	5	6	7	8	9	10	Final
Norway (Nordby) 🔨	0	2	0	0	0	2	1	0	2	1	8
Russia (Jarkova)	0	0	0	0	2	0	0	2	0	0	4

Sheet C	1	2	3	4	5	6	7	8	9	10	Final
Switzerland (Strausak)	0	2	3	0	2	0	1	0	0	0	8
Italy (Gaspari) 🔨	1	0	0	2	0	1	0	1	3	1	9

Sheet D	1	2	3	4	5	6	7	8	9	10	Final
United States (McCormick) 🔨	2	0	2	0	1	0	1	0	0	0	6
Sweden (Norberg)	0	1	0	2	0	2	0	3	1	1	10

Sheet E	1	2	3	4	5	6	7	8	9	10	Final
Denmark (Holm)	0	1	3	1	2	0	3	0	X	X	10
Japan (Aota) 🔨	1	0	0	0	0	1	0	2	X	X	4

=== Draw 7 ===
April 9, 2003 08:00

Sheet A	1	2	3	4	5	6	7	8	9	10	Final
Italy (Gaspari)	0	0	1	1	0	1	0	2	0	1	5
Norway (Nordby) 🔨	2	1	0	0	1	0	1	0	0	0	6

Sheet B	1	2	3	4	5	6	7	8	9	10	Final
Scotland (Loudon) 🔨	0	3	0	0	3	0	0	2	0	0	8
Denmark (Holm)	0	0	1	2	0	2	1	0	1	0	7

Sheet C	1	2	3	4	5	6	7	8	9	10	Final
Canada (Jones) 🔨	2	0	0	0	3	1	1	1	0	1	9
United States (McCormick)	0	2	0	1	0	0	0	0	1	0	4

Sheet D	1	2	3	4	5	6	7	8	9	10	Final
Japan (Aota)	1	0	1	0	1	3	0	1	0	1	8
Switzerland (Strausak) 🔨	0	1	0	1	0	0	2	0	1	0	5

Sheet E	1	2	3	4	5	6	7	8	9	10	Final
Russia (Jarkova) 🔨	0	0	2	0	3	0	0	0	0	2	7
Sweden (Norberg)	0	0	0	1	0	3	1	4	1	0	10

=== Draw 8 ===
April 9, 2003 18:00

Sheet A	1	2	3	4	5	6	7	8	9	10	Final
Switzerland (Strausak)	0	2	1	0	1	1	0	1	0	1	7
Russia (Jarkova) 🔨	1	0	0	1	0	0	1	0	1	0	4

Sheet B	1	2	3	4	5	6	7	8	9	10	Final
Canada (Jones) 🔨	1	0	1	0	0	0	4	0	0	1	7
Japan (Aota)	0	1	0	1	0	1	0	0	1	0	4

Sheet C	1	2	3	4	5	6	7	8	9	10	Final
Scotland (Loudon)	0	1	0	0	1	0	1	1	0	0	4
Sweden (Norberg) 🔨	2	0	0	1	0	1	0	0	2	0	6

Sheet D	1	2	3	4	5	6	7	8	9	10	Final
Denmark (Holm) 🔨	2	0	0	0	3	0	0	2	0	3	10
Italy (Gaspari)	0	3	2	1	0	0	1	0	1	0	8

Sheet E	1	2	3	4	5	6	7	8	9	10	11	Final
Norway (Nordby)	0	0	0	2	0	1	1	1	0	0	0	5
United States (McCormick) 🔨	0	0	1	0	1	0	0	0	2	1	2	7

=== Draw 9 ===
April 10, 2003 13:00

Sheet A	1	2	3	4	5	6	7	8	9	10	11	Final
Canada (Jones)	0	1	0	0	0	2	0	2	0	2	1	8
Sweden (Norberg) 🔨	1	0	1	1	1	0	1	0	2	0	0	7

Sheet B	1	2	3	4	5	6	7	8	9	10	Final
Russia (Jarkova)	0	0	0	0	0	3	0	0	2	0	5
Italy (Gaspari) 🔨	2	2	0	1	1	0	0	1	0	2	9

Sheet C	1	2	3	4	5	6	7	8	9	10	Final
Japan (Aota) 🔨	1	0	2	0	0	0	2	0	1	0	6
Norway (Nordby)	0	1	0	2	1	1	0	1	0	3	9

Sheet D	1	2	3	4	5	6	7	8	9	10	Final
Scotland (Loudon) 🔨	0	0	0	0	0	2	2	0	1	2	7
United States (McCormick)	0	0	1	3	3	0	0	1	0	0	8

Sheet E	1	2	3	4	5	6	7	8	9	10	Final
Switzerland (Strausak)	1	0	0	2	3	1	0	1	X	X	8
Denmark (Holm) 🔨	0	0	1	0	0	0	1	0	X	X	2

== Playoffs ==
=== Brackets ===
Semifinals
1	Canada	8
4	Norway	7
3	United States	5
2	Sweden	4

Final
3	United States	5
1	Canada	3
Bronze medal
4	Norway	5
2	Sweden	7

=== Semifinals ===
April 11, 2003 18:00

Sheet B	1	2	3	4	5	6	7	8	9	10	11	Final
Canada (Jones) 🔨	0	2	2	0	0	2	0	0	1	0	1	8
Norway (Nordby)	0	0	0	2	2	0	0	1	0	2	0	7

Player Percentages
Canada		Norway	
Nancy Delahunt	76%	Camilla Holth	78%
Mary-Anne Waye	83%	Marianne Haslum	84%
Kim Kelly	78%	Hanne Woods	78%
Colleen Jones	77%	Dordi Nordby	85%
Total	78%	Total	81%

Sheet D	1	2	3	4	5	6	7	8	9	10	Final
United States (McCormick) 🔨	1	0	1	0	0	0	0	0	3	0	5
Sweden (Norberg)	0	1	0	1	0	1	0	0	0	1	4

Player Percentages
United States		Sweden	
Tracy Sachtjen	85%	Helena Lingham	91%
Ann Swisshelm Silver	78%	Cathrine Norberg	75%
Allison Pottinger	80%	Eva Lund	74%
Debbie McCormick	78%	Anette Norberg	71%
Total	80%	Total	78%

=== Bronze medal game ===
April 12, 2003 08:00

Sheet C	1	2	3	4	5	6	7	8	9	10	Final
Norway (Nordby) 🔨	0	2	0	1	0	0	0	0	1	1	5
Sweden (Norberg)	0	0	1	0	1	2	2	1	0	0	7

Player Percentages
Norway		Sweden	
Camilla Holth	66%	Helena Lingham	78%
Marianne Haslum	61%	Cathrine Norberg	78%
Hanne Woods	65%	Eva Lund	84%
Dordi Nordby	63%	Anette Norberg	78%
Total	64%	Total	80%

=== Final ===
April 12, 2003 12:30

Sheet C	1	2	3	4	5	6	7	8	9	10	Final
United States (McCormick)	0	1	0	2	0	0	1	0	0	1	5
Canada (Jones) 🔨	0	0	1	0	1	0	0	0	1	0	3

Player Percentages
United States		Canada	
Tracy Sachtjen	83%	Nancy Delahunt	94%
Ann Swisshelm Silver	83%	Mary-Anne Waye	80%
Allison Pottinger	83%	Kim Kelly	74%
Debbie McCormick	80%	Colleen Jones	74%
Total	81%	Total	80%

== Player percentages ==
Leads	%	Seconds	%	Thirds	%	Skips	%
(Canada) Nancy Delahunt	87	(Canada) Mary-Anne Waye	80	(Canada) Kim Kelly	78	(Canada) Colleen Jones	79
(United States) Tracy Sachtjen	81	(Switzerland) Madlaina Breuleux	80	(United States) Allison Pottinger	77	(Sweden) Anette Norberg	77
(Russia) Anastassia Skoultan	81	(United States) Ann Swisshelm Silver	78	(Russia) Nkeiruka Ezekh	76	(Russia) Olga Jarkova	71
(Norway) Camilla Holth	80	(Russia) Yana Nekrosova	77	(Japan) Yukari Okazaki	74	(Switzerland) Selina Breuleux	71
(Denmark) Lisa Richardson	79	(Sweden) Cathrine Norberg	76	(Sweden) Eva Lund	73	(Denmark) Dorthe Holm	69
