= 1995 World Women's Curling Championship =

Curling Championship held in Manitoba, Canada

- Host city: Brandon, Manitoba, Canada
- Arena: Keystone Centre
- Dates: April 8-16, 1995
- Winner: Sweden
- Curling club: Umeå CK
- Skip: Elisabet Gustafson
- Third: Katarina Nyberg
- Second: Louise Marmont
- Lead: Elisabeth Persson
- Alternate: Helena Svensson
- Finalist: Canada (Connie Laliberte)

The 1995 World Women's Curling Championship (branded as 1995 Ford World Women's Curling Championship for sponsorship reasons) was held at the Keystone Centre in Brandon, Manitoba, Canada from April 8–16, 1995.

== Teams ==
Canada	Denmark	France	Germany	Japan
Fort Rouge CC, Winnipeg, Manitoba Skip: Connie Laliberte; Third: Cathy Overton; Second: Cathy Gauthier; Lead: Janet Arnott; Alternate: Debbie Jones-Walker	Hvidovre CC Skip: Helena Blach Lavrsen; Third: Dorthe Holm; Second: Helene Jensen; Lead: Margit Pörtner; Alternate: Lisa Richardson	Megève CC Skip: Brigitte Lamy; Third: Jocelyn Cault-Lhenry; Second: Gaetane Bibollet; Lead: Brigitte Collard; Alternate: Tatiana Ducroz	SC Riessersee, Garmisch-Partenkirchen Skip: Andrea Schöpp; Third: Monika Wagner; Second: Natalie Nessler; Lead: Carina Meidele; Alternate: Heike Schwaller	Tokoro Curling Association, Hokkaido Skip: Ayako Ishigaki; Third: Emi Fujita; Second: Yukari Kondo; Lead: Yoko Mimura; Alternate: Mayumi Ohkutsu
Norway	Scotland	Sweden	Switzerland	United States
Snarøen CC, Oslo Skip: Dordi Nordby; Third: Hanne Pettersen; Second: Marianne Aspelin; Lead: Cecilie Torhaug	Airleywight Ladies CC, Perth Skip: Kirsty Hay; Third: Edith Loudon; Second: Joanna Pegg; Lead: Katie Loudon; Alternate: Claire Milne	Umeå CK Skip: Elisabet Gustafson; Third: Katarina Nyberg; Second: Louise Marmont; Lead: Elisabeth Persson; Alternate: Helena Svensson	Leukerbad CC Skip: Graziella Grichting; Third: Selina Breuleux; Second: Madlaina Breuleux; Lead: Inger Müller; Alternate: Claudia Biner	Madison CC, McFarland, Wisconsin Skip: Lisa Schoeneberg; Third: Erika Brown; Second: Lori Mountford; Lead: Marcia Tillisch; Alternate: Allison Darragh

== Round robin standings ==
Country	Skip	W	L
Canada	Connie Laliberte	8	1
Norway	Dordi Nordby	8	1
Sweden	Elisabet Gustafson	6	3
Germany	Andrea Schöpp	5	4
Denmark	Helena Blach Lavrsen	4	5
United States	Lisa Schoeneberg	4	5
Scotland	Kirsty Hay	4	5
Switzerland	Graziella Grichting	4	5
Japan	Ayako Ishigaki	2	7
France	Brigitte Lamy	0	9

== Round robin results ==
=== Draw 1 ===
Sheet A	Final
Sweden (Gustafson)	11
Denmark (Lavrsen)	2

Sheet B	Final
France (Lamy)	4
Scotland (Hay)	10

Sheet C	Final
Germany (Schöpp)	2
Canada (Laliberte)	5

Sheet D	Final
Switzerland (Grichting)	3
Norway (Nordby)	4

Sheet E	Final
Japan (Ishigaki)	6
United States (Schoeneberg)	10

=== Draw 2 ===
Sheet A	Final
Japan (Ishigaki)	9
France (Lamy)	5

Sheet B	Final
Canada (Laliberte)	10
United States (Schoeneberg)	9

Sheet C	Final
Sweden (Gustafson)	6
Switzerland (Grichting)	3

Sheet D	Final
Germany (Schöpp)	10
Denmark (Lavrsen)	7

Sheet E	Final
Scotland (Hay)	6
Norway (Nordby)	11

=== Draw 3 ===
Sheet A	Final
Norway (Nordby)	10
United States (Schoeneberg)	6

Sheet B	Final
Denmark (Lavrsen)	4
Switzerland (Grichting)	7

Sheet C	Final
Scotland (Hay)	9
Japan (Ishigaki)	4

Sheet D	Final
Canada (Laliberte)	6
Sweden (Gustafson)	4

Sheet E	Final
Germany (Schöpp)	6
France (Lamy)	4

=== Draw 4 ===
Sheet A	Final
Denmark (Lavrsen)	5
Scotland (Hay)	4

Sheet B	Final
Germany (Schöpp)	5
Sweden (Gustafson)	8

Sheet C	Final
France (Lamy)	4
United States (Schoeneberg)	7

Sheet D	Final
Norway (Nordby)	7
Japan (Ishigaki)	4

Sheet E	Final
Switzerland (Grichting)	4
Canada (Laliberte)	6

=== Draw 5 ===
Sheet A	Final
Germany (Schöpp)	6
Japan (Ishigaki)	3

Sheet B	Final
Scotland (Hay)	5
Canada (Laliberte)	6

Sheet C	Final
Denmark (Lavrsen)	3
Norway (Nordby)	9

Sheet D	Final
France (Lamy)	2
Switzerland (Grichting)	6

Sheet E	Final
United States (Schoeneberg)	5
Sweden (Gustafson)	8

=== Draw 6 ===
Sheet A	Final
United States (Schoeneberg)	7
Switzerland (Grichting)	3

Sheet B	Final
Sweden (Gustafson)	5
Norway (Nordby)	7

Sheet C	Final
Canada (Laliberte)	6
France (Lamy)	5

Sheet D	Final
Scotland (Hay)	3
Germany (Schöpp)	6

Sheet E	Final
Denmark (Lavrsen)	6
Japan (Ishigaki)	11

=== Draw 7 ===
Sheet A	Final
France (Lamy)	1
Sweden (Gustafson)	11

Sheet B	Final
United States (Schoeneberg)	4
Denmark (Lavrsen)	7

Sheet C	Final
Switzerland (Grichting)	4
Scotland (Hay)	7

Sheet D	Final
Japan (Ishigaki)	2
Canada (Laliberte)	5

Sheet E	Final
Norway (Nordby)	5
Germany (Schöpp)	4

=== Draw 8 ===
Sheet A	Final
Canada (Laliberte)	8
Norway (Nordby)	7

Sheet B	Final
Switzerland (Grichting)	6
Japan (Ishigaki)	5

Sheet C	Final
Denmark (Lavrsen)	5
Germany (Schöpp)	8

Sheet D	Final
Denmark (Lavrsen)	7
France (Lamy)	5

Sheet E	Final
Sweden (Gustafson)	6
Scotland (Hay)	8

=== Draw 9 ===
Sheet A	Final
Switzerland (Grichting)	5
Germany (Schöpp)	3

Sheet B	Final
Norway (Nordby)	9
France (Lamy)	3

Sheet C	Final
Japan (Ishigaki)	3
Sweden (Gustafson)	12

Sheet D	Final
United States (Schoeneberg)	8
Scotland (Hay)	6

Sheet E	Final
Canada (Laliberte)	1
Germany (Schöpp)	10

== Playoffs ==
=== Brackets ===
Semi-final
1	Canada	10
4	Germany	4
2	Norway	4
3	Sweden	6

Final
1	Canada	5
3	Sweden	6
Bronze medal
2	Norway	8
4	Germany	3

=== Final ===
Sheet A	1	2	3	4	5	6	7	8	9	10	11	Final
Canada (Laliberte)	1	0	2	0	0	0	1	1	0	0	0	5
Sweden (Gustafson)	0	1	0	1	1	0	0	0	1	1	1	6
