= 2000 European Curling Championships =

- Host city: Oberstdorf, Germany
- Arena: Eislaufzentrum
- Dates: December 9–16, 2000
- Men's winner: Finland
- Skip: Markku Uusipaavalniemi
- Third: Wille Mäkelä
- Second: Tommi Häti
- Lead: Jari Laukkanen
- Alternate: Pekka Saarelainen
- Finalist: Denmark
- Women's winner: Sweden
- Curling club: Umeå CK
- Skip: Elisabet Gustafson
- Third: Katarina Nyberg
- Second: Louise Marmont
- Lead: Elisabeth Persson
- Alternate: Christina Bertrup
- Coach: Jan Strandlund, Stefan Hasselborg
- Finalist: Norway

The 2000 European Curling Championships were held in Oberstdorf, Germany from December 9 to 16.

== Men's ==
=== A tournament ===
==== Final round-robin standings ====
Team	Skip	W	L
Finland	Markku Uusipaavalniemi	9	0
Denmark	Ulrik Schmidt	7	2
Switzerland	Andreas Schwaller	7	2
Sweden	Peja Lindholm	6	3
Norway	Thomas Ulsrud	4	5
Germany	Andy Kapp	4	5
France	Dominique Dupont-Roc	3	6
Scotland	David Mundell	3	6
Netherlands	Christian Dupont-Roc	1	8
Luxembourg	Heribert Krämer	1	8

==== Playoffs ====
Semi-final
1	Finland	8
4	Sweden	7
3	Switzerland	5
2	Denmark	6

Final
1	Finland	8
2	Denmark	7
Bronze medal
4	Sweden	10
3	Switzerland	7

==== Medals ====
Medal	Team
Gold	Finland (Markku Uusipaavalniemi, Wille Mäkelä, Tommi Häti, Jari Laukkanen, and Pekka Saarelainen)
Silver	Denmark (Ulrik Schmidt, Lasse Lavrsen, Brian Hansen, Carsten Svensgaard, and Frants Gufler)
Bronze	Sweden (Peja Lindholm, Tomas Nordin, Magnus Swartling, Peter Narup, and Anders Kraupp)

== Women's ==
=== A tournament ===
==== Final round-robin standings ====
Team	Skip	W	L
Sweden	Elisabet Gustafson	7	0
Switzerland	Nadja Heuer	5	2
Norway	Dordi Nordby	5	2
Germany	Andrea Schöpp	4	3
Scotland	Gillian Howard	3	4
Denmark	Lene Bidstrup	3	4
Russia	Nina Golovtchenko	1	6
France	Sandrine Morand	0	7

==== Playoffs ====
Semi-final
1	Sweden	4
4	Germany	2
3	Norway	6
2	Switzerland	5

Final
1	Sweden	9
3	Norway	4
Bronze medal
4	Germany	6
2	Switzerland	7

==== Medals ====
Medal	Team
Gold	Sweden (Elisabet Gustafson, Katarina Nyberg, Louise Marmont, Elisabeth Persson, and Christina Bertrup)
Silver	Norway (Dordi Nordby, Hanne Woods, Kristin Tøsse Løvseth, Cecilie Torhaug, and Camilla Holth)
Bronze	Switzerland (Nadja Heuer, Carmen Küng, Sybil Bachofen, Vera Heuer, and Yvonne Schlunegger)
