= 1997 World Women's Curling Championship =

- Host city: Bern, Switzerland
- Arena: Allmend Stadium
- Dates: April 12–20, 1997
- Winner: Canada
- Curling club: Caledonian CC, Regina, Saskatchewan
- Skip: Sandra Schmirler
- Third: Jan Betker
- Second: Joan McCusker
- Lead: Marcia Gudereit
- Alternate: Atina Ford
- Finalist: Norway (Dordi Nordby)

The 1997 World Women's Curling Championship (branded as 1997 Ford World Women's Curling Championship for sponsorship reasons) was held at Allmend Stadium in Bern, Switzerland from April 12 to 20, 1997.

== Teams ==
Canada	Denmark	Finland	Germany	Japan
Caledonian CC, Regina, Saskatchewan Skip: Sandra Schmirler; Third: Jan Betker; Second: Joan McCusker; Lead: Marcia Gudereit; Alternate: Atina Ford	Hvidovre CC, Hvidovre Skip: Helena Blach Lavrsen; Third: Margit Pörtner; Second: Dorthe Holm; Lead: Lisa Richardson; Alternate: Jane Bidstrup	Hyvinkää CC, Hyvinkää Skip: Jaana Jokela*; Fourth: Anne Eerikäinen; Second: Nina Pöllänen; Lead: Laura Franssila; Alternate: Tiina Kautonen (*Throws third rocks)	SC Riessersee, Garmisch-Partenkirchen Skip: Andrea Schöpp; Third: Monika Wagner; Second: Natalie Neßler; Lead: Carina Meidele; Alternate: Heike Wieländer	Obihiro CC, Hokkaidō Skip: Mayumi Ohkutsu; Third: Akiko Katoh; Second: Yukari Kondo; Lead: Yoko Mimura; Alternate: Akemi Niwa
Norway	Scotland	Sweden	Switzerland	United States
Snarøen CC, Oslo Skip: Dordi Nordby; Third: Marianne Haslum; Second: Marianne Aspelin; Lead: Kristin Løvseth; Alternate: Hanne Woods	Lockerbie CC, Lockerbie Skip: Carolyn Hutchison; Third: Heather Crockett; Second: Jan Byers; Lead: Lucy Levack; Alternate: Gillian Barr	Härnösands CK, Härnösand Skip: Cathrine Norberg; Third: Helena Svensson; Second: Anna Blom; Lead: Annika Lööf; Alternate: Margaretha Lindahl	Bern CC, Bern Skip: Mirjam Ott; Third: Manuela Kormann; Second: Franziska von Känel; Lead: Caroline Balz; Alternate: Marianne Flotron	Arlington CC, Wisconsin Skip: Patti Lank; Third: Analissa Johnson; Second: Joni Cotten; Lead: Tracy Sachtjen; Alternate: Allison Darragh

== Round-robin standings ==
Key
Teams to playoffs
Teams to tiebreaker

Country	Skip	W	L
Canada	Sandra Schmirler	8	1
Norway	Dordi Nordby	7	2
Japan	Mayumi Ohkutsu	6	3
Sweden	Cathrine Norberg	5	4
Denmark	Helena Blach Lavrsen	5	4
Germany	Andrea Schöpp	4	5
United States	Patti Lank	4	5
Finland	Jaana Jokela	2	7
Scotland	Carolyn Hutchison	2	7
Switzerland	Mirjam Ott	2	7

== Round-robin results ==
=== Draw 1 ===
Sheet A	Final
Scotland (Hutchison)	5
Finland (Jokela)	6

Sheet B	Final
Denmark (Lavrsen)	8
Switzerland (Ott)	5

Sheet C	Final
Sweden (Norberg)	7
United States (Lank)	5

Sheet D	Final
Germany (Schöpp)	6
Japan (Mayumi)	7

Sheet E	Final
Norway (Nordby)	3
Canada (Schmirler)	5

=== Draw 2 ===
Sheet A	Final
Norway (Nordby)	7
Switzerland (Ott)	5

Sheet B	Final
Canada (Schmirler)	9
United States (Lank)	4

Sheet C	Final
Scotland (Hutchison)	3
Germany (Schöpp)	10

Sheet D	Final
Sweden (Norberg)	7
Finland (Jokela)	4

Sheet E	Final
Denmark (Lavrsen)	11
Japan (Mayumi)	4

=== Draw 3 ===
Sheet A	Final
Japan (Mayumi)	4
Canada (Schmirler)	7

Sheet B	Final
Germany (Schöpp)	3
Finland (Jokela)	7

Sheet C	Final
Denmark (Lavrsen)	4
Norway (Nordby)	5

Sheet D	Final
United States (Lank)	10
Scotland (Hutchison)	0

Sheet E	Final
Sweden (Norberg)	4
Switzerland (Ott)	8

=== Draw 4 ===
Sheet A	Final
Finland (Jokela)	8
Denmark (Lavrsen)	10

Sheet B	Final
Scotland (Hutchison)	11
Sweden (Norberg)	3

Sheet C	Final
Switzerland (Ott)	5
Canada (Schmirler)	7

Sheet D	Final
Japan (Mayumi)	6
Norway (Nordby)	8

Sheet E	Final
Germany (Schöpp)	8
United States (Lank)	5

=== Draw 5 ===
Sheet A	Final
Sweden (Norberg)	9
Norway (Nordby)	7

Sheet B	Final
United States (Lank)	9
Denmark (Lavrsen)	8

Sheet C	Final
Japan (Mayumi)	7
Finland (Jokela)	4

Sheet D	Final
Switzerland (Ott)	6
Germany (Schöpp)	7

Sheet E	Final
Canada (Schmirler)	8
Scotland (Hutchison)	4

=== Draw 6 ===
Sheet A	Final
Canada (Schmirler)	5
Germany (Schöpp)	8

Sheet B	Final
Japan (Mayumi)	8
Scotland (Hutchison)	5

Sheet C	Final
United States (Lank)	10
Switzerland (Ott)	6

Sheet D	Final
Denmark (Lavrsen)	5
Sweden (Norberg)	8

Sheet E	Final
Finland (Jokela)	3
Norway (Nordby)	14

=== Draw 7 ===
Sheet A	Final
Switzerland (Ott)	3
Scotland (Hutchison)	12

Sheet B	Final
Finland (Jokela)	6
Canada (Schmirler)	9

Sheet C	Final
Germany (Schöpp)	5
Denmark (Lavrsen)	6

Sheet D	Final
Norway (Nordby)	9
United States (Lank)	5

Sheet E	Final
Japan (Mayumi)	5
Sweden (Norberg)	4

=== Draw 8 ===
Sheet A	Final
United States (Lank)	6
Japan (Mayumi)	9

Sheet B	Final
Norway (Nordby)	9
Germany (Schöpp)	1

Sheet C	Final
Canada (Schmirler)	12
Sweden (Norberg)	4

Sheet D	Final
Finland (Jokela)	3
Switzerland (Ott)	11

Sheet E	Final
Scotland (Hutchison)	1
Denmark (Lavrsen)	8

=== Draw 9 ===
Sheet A	Final
Germany (Schöpp)	7
Sweden (Norberg)	10

Sheet B	Final
Switzerland (Ott)	6
Japan (Mayumi)	10

Sheet C	Final
Norway (Nordby)	8
Scotland (Hutchison)	5

Sheet D	Final
Canada (Schmirler)	9
Denmark (Lavrsen)	3

Sheet E	Final
United States (Lank)	10
Finland (Jokela)	2

== Tiebreaker ==
Sheet A	Final
Denmark (Lavrsen)	5
Sweden (Norberg)	4

== Playoffs ==
=== Brackets ===
Semi-final
1	Canada	5
4	Denmark	2
2	Norway	12
3	Japan	5

Final
1	Canada	8
2	Norway	4
Bronze medal
4	Denmark	7
3	Japan	6

=== Final ===
Sheet A	1	2	3	4	5	6	7	8	9	10	Final
Norway (Nordby)	0	0	0	1	0	1	1	1	0	X	4
Canada (Schmirler)	0	0	1	0	5	0	0	0	2	X	8
