= Elisabeth Persson =

Swedish curler

- Curler
- Other names: Maria Elisabeth Persson
- Born: 21 January 1964 (age 62); Umeå, Sweden
Medal record
Women's curling
Representing Sweden
Olympic Games
Bronze medal – third place	1998 Nagano
World Championships
Gold medal – first place	1992 Garmisch-Partenkirchen
Gold medal – first place	1995 Brandon
Gold medal – first place	1998 Kamloops
Gold medal – first place	1999 Saint John
Bronze medal – third place	1993 Geneva
Bronze medal – third place	1994 Oberstdorf
European Championships
Gold medal – first place	1992 Perth
Gold medal – first place	1993 Leukerbad
Gold medal – first place	1997 Füssen
Gold medal – first place	2000 Oberstdorf
Silver medal – second place	1996 Copenhagen
Bronze medal – third place	1995 Grindelwald

Maria Elisabeth Persson (born 21 January 1964) is a Swedish curler, world champion and Olympic medalist. She received a bronze medal at the 1998 Winter Olympics in Nagano. She is a four-time world champion with the Swedish team, winning with skip Elisabet Gustafson in 1992, 1995, 1998, and 1999.

In 1993 she was inducted into the Swedish Curling Hall of Fame and in 2020 she and the rest of Team Gustafson were inducted into the World Curling Hall of Fame.

At the time of the 1999 World Championships, she was living in Umeå.
