= Dorthe Holm =

Danish curler and Olympic medalist

- Curler
- Born: 3 July 1972 (age 54); Copenhagen, Denmark

Curling career
- World Championship: 6 (1994, 1995, 1996, 1997, 1998, 2003)
- European Championship: 9 (1991, 1994, 1995, 1996, 1997, 1998, 2002, 2003, 2005)
- Olympic: 3 (1992, 1998, 2006)
Medal record
Women's curling
Representing Denmark
Olympic Games
Silver medal – second place	1998 Nagano	Team
World Championships
Silver medal – second place	1998 Kamloops	Team
Bronze medal – third place	1997 Bern	Team
European Championships
Gold medal – first place	1994 Sundsvall	Team
Silver medal – second place	1997 Füssen	Team
Silver medal – second place	2002 Grindelwald	Team
Bronze medal – third place	1998 Flims	Team
Bronze medal – third place	2003 Courmayeur	Team
Bronze medal – third place	2005 Garmisch-Partenkirchen	Team
World Junior Championships
Bronze medal – third place	1993 Grindelwald	Team
Bronze medal – third place	1994 Sofia	Team

Dorthe Holm (born 3 July 1972) is a Danish curler from Kastrup. She won a silver medal at 1998 Winter Olympics.

== Career ==
Holm skipped the Danish women's team at the 2006 Winter Olympics. The team were the only athletes Denmark sent to the games, as such Holm carried the flag for Denmark in the opening ceremonies.

Holm has had a long curling career, which internationally began in 1987 at the European Junior Championships. By 1994, Holm had competed in six World Junior Curling Championships, winning bronze in 1993 and 1994. She skipped Denmark in 1993, and was the third for Angelina Jensen in 1994. At the 1992 Winter Olympics she was an alternate for the Danish team, when curling was just a demonstration event. The team finished in fourth place.

In 1994, Denmark won the European Curling Championships, and Holm played third for the team that was skipped by Helena Blach Lavrsen. After three unsuccessful trips to the World Curling Championships, Holm finally won a medal in 1997, a bronze, when she played second for Blach Lavrsen. She moved up to third later in the year, and won a silver at the European Championships. That same season she was playing second again, and she picked up a silver medal at curling's debut at the 1998 Winter Olympics. This was the first medal, Denmark has ever won at a Winter Olympics, and the only one until 2026, when Viktor Hald Thorup won silver medals at the 2026 Olympics. She also won a silver at that year's World Championships, followed by a bronze at the European Championships, as a third once again.

Holm wouldn't return to the international scene until 2002, at this point she was skipping the Danish team. As skip she won a silver at the 2002 European Championships, and a bronze in the 2003 and 2005 European Championships. At the 2006 Olympics, Denmark placed 8th.

== Awards ==
- 1991 - WJCC All-Star, Skip
- 1994 - WJCC All-Star, Third
- 1991 - WJCC Sportsmanship Award
- 1993 - WJCC Sportsmanship Award
