= Ingrid Stensrud =

Norwegian curler (born 1986)

- Curler
- Born: 23 April 1986 (age 40)

Team
- Curling club: Stabekk CC, Oslo
- Skip: Linn Githmark
- Third: Henriette Løvar
- Second: Ingrid Stensrud
- Lead: Kristin Skaslien
- Alternate: Kristin Tøsse Løvseth

Curling career
- World Championship: 2 (2009, 2010)
- European Championship: 3 (2007, 2008, 2009)

Ingrid Stensrud (born 23 April 1986) is a Norwegian curler.

She was second for the Norwegian team at the 2010 Ford World Women's Curling Championship in Swift Current, Canada.
