= Cecilie Torhaug =

Norwegian curler (born 1969)

Medal record

Representing Norway

Women's curling

World Championships
Bronze medal – third place	1993 Geneva	
Bronze medal – third place	1995 Brandon	
Bronze medal – third place	2000 Glasgow	

European Championships
Gold medal – first place	1999 Chamonix	
Silver medal – second place	2000 Oberstdorf	
Bronze medal – third place	1993 Leukerbad	
Bronze medal – third place	1994 Sundsvall	

Cecilie Benedicte Torhaug (born 27 July 1969) is a Norwegian curler. She won bronze medals at the 1993, 1995 and 2000 World Curling Championships.
