= 2005 World Women's Curling Championship =

- Host city: Paisley, Scotland
- Arena: Lagoon Leisure Centre
- Dates: March 19–27, 2005
- Winner: Sweden
- Curling club: Härnösands CK
- Skip: Anette Norberg
- Third: Eva Lund
- Second: Cathrine Lindahl
- Lead: Anna Bergström
- Alternate: Ulrika Bergman
- Coach: Stefan Lund
- Finalist: United States (Cassandra Johnson)

The 2005 World Women's Curling Championship was held from March 19–27, 2005 at the Lagoon Leisure Centre in Paisley, Scotland. The tournament was the first since the 1988 event to be held separately from the 2005 Ford World Men's Curling Championship.

The tournament was plagued with problems from the start. Ice conditions were not the best, due to a number of factors, including the arena being located adjacent to a swimming pool. Also, de-ionized water, a standard at major events was not used for the first draws, due to a refusal by the organising committee to pay for it. These ice issues led to the postponement of the fourth draw. Also, ticket prices were very expensive, leading to poor attendance numbers. Due to a dispute with volunteers who wanted to be paid, time clocks were not used. This meant that the on-ice umpire was allowed to pull rocks out of a game as a penalty for slow play. This arguably cost the Russian team a loss in one game.

In the end, it was Sweden, skipped by Anette Norberg who won her first championship, and Sweden's first since 1999, with a win in the final over the United States, skipped by Cassandra Johnson. Norway, skipped by Dordi Nordby won bronze.

== Qualifying ==
Teams qualified for the World Curling Championship in a series of different tournaments depending on their location.

European teams qualified through the Le Gruyère 2004 European Curling Championships, held in Sofia, Bulgaria, December 4–11, 2004. Eight of the twelve qualifying teams (Sweden, Switzerland, Norway, Russia, Scotland, Italy, Finland, and Denmark) were selected from Europe.

Australian and Asian teams qualified through the 2004 Pacific Curling Championships in Chuncheon, South Korea. Two teams (Japan and China) qualified for the World Curling Championship.

The Canadian women's team was selected through the 2005 Scott Tournament of Hearts. The U.S. team was selected through the 2006 U.S. Olympic Team Trials.

== Teams ==
The 2005 World Women's Curling Championship was contested between teams from three continents: Asia, Europe, and North America. The list of teams differed from the Men's Curling Championship. Teams included 1990 and 1991 World Champion Dordi Nordby of Norway and 2001 Silver medalist Anette Norberg of Sweden. Joining them in their 4th trip to the worlds was Olga Jarkova's Russian team, in their 3rd appearance were Yumie Hayashi of Japan and Diana Gaspari of Italy, making their 2nd appearance were Mirjam Ott of Switzerland, Madeleine Dupont of Denmark, Kirsi Nykanen of Finland and Kelly Wood of Scotland. Making their first appearance at the worlds were Jennifer Jones of Canada, Wang Bingyu of China and Cassandra Johnson of the United States.

Canada	China	Denmark
St. Vital CC, Winnipeg Skip: Jennifer Jones; Third: Cathy Overton-Clapham; Second: Jill Officer; Lead: Cathy Gauthier; Alternate: Trisha Eck	Harbin CC Skip: Wang Bingyu; Third: Yue Qingshuang; Second: Liu Yin; Lead: Zhou Yan; Alternate: Yu Xinna	Hvidovre CC Skip: Madeleine Dupont; Third: Denise Dupont; Second: Lene Nielsen; Lead: Maria Poulsen; Alternate: Helle Simonsen
Finland	Italy	Japan
Hyvinkää CC Fourth: Tiina Kautonen; Skip: Kirsi Nykänen; Second: Sari Laakkonen; Lead: Minna Malinen; Alternate: Riikka Louhivuori	New Wave CC, Cortina d'Ampezzo Skip: Diana Gaspari; Third: Giulia Lacedelli; Second: Rosa Pompanin; Lead: Violetta Caldart; Alternate: Eleonora Alvera	Aomori CC, Aomori Fourth: Yumie Hayashi; Skip: Ayumi Onodera; Second: Mari Motohashi; Lead: Sakurako Terada; Alternate: Ai Kobayashi
Norway	Russia	Scotland
Snarøen CC, Oslo Skip: Dordi Nordby; Third: Linn Githmark; Second: Marianne Haslum; Lead: Camilla Holth; Alternate: Marianne Rørvik	Moskvitch CC, Moscow Skip: Ludmila Privivkova; Third: Nkeiruka Ezekh; Second: Yana Nekrasova; Lead: Ekaterina Galkina; Alternate: Olga Jarkova	Dun CC Skip: Kelly Wood; Third: Lorna Vevers; Second: Sheila Swan; Lead: Lindsay Wood; Alternate: Claire Milne
Sweden	Switzerland	United States
Härnösands CCK, Härnösand Skip: Anette Norberg; Third: Eva Lund; Second: Cathrine Lindahl; Lead: Anna Bergström; Alternate: Ulrika Bergman	Flims CC Skip: Mirjam Ott; Third: Binia Beeli; Second: Brigitte Schori; Lead: Michèle Knobel; Alternate: Valeria Spälty	Bemidji CC Skip: Cassandra Johnson; Third: Jamie Johnson; Second: Jessica Schultz; Lead: Maureen Brunt; Alternate: Courtney George

== Round-robin standings ==
Key
Teams to playoffs
Teams to tiebreaker

Locale	Skip	W	L	PF	PA	Ends Won	Ends Lost	Blank Ends	Stolen Ends	Shot Pct.
Sweden	Anette Norberg	11	0	89	53	56	39	11	25	75%
United States	Cassandra Johnson	10	1	89	54	53	38	13	22	76%
Canada	Jennifer Jones	8	3	94	70	48	45	3	21	68%
Norway	Dordi Nordby	7	4	85	55	46	40	11	19	72%
Russia	Olga Jarkova	7	4	78	66	47	45	17	10	70%
Scotland	Kelly Wood	6	5	82	66	53	40	6	23	69%
China*	Wang Bingyu	4	7	63	74	42	45	14	13	68%
Switzerland	Mirjam Ott	4	7	74	77	45	48	11	13	72%
Japan	Ayumi Onodera	3	8	67	92	41	48	8	12	66%
Denmark	Madeleine Dupont	3	8	52	88	36	50	10	12	63%
Italy	Diana Gaspari	2	9	53	79	39	46	7	12	65%
Finland	Kirsi Nykänen	1	10	48	102	32	55	3	9	58%

*First Appearance

== Round-robin results ==
=== Draw 1 ===
March 19, 2005 10:00

Sheet A	1	2	3	4	5	6	7	8	9	10	Final
United States (Johnson)	0	0	1	4	1	0	0	1	0	2	9
Scotland (Wood) 🔨	2	1	0	0	0	1	3	0	1	0	8

Sheet B	1	2	3	4	5	6	7	8	9	10	11	Final
Canada (Jones)	0	0	0	1	0	0	3	1	0	0	1	6
Switzerland (Ott) 🔨	0	0	1	0	1	1	0	0	1	1	0	5

Sheet C	1	2	3	4	5	6	7	8	9	10	Final
Italy (Gaspari)	0	0	2	1	0	1	1	0	0	0	5
Sweden (Norberg) 🔨	0	1	0	0	2	0	0	1	2	2	8

Sheet D	1	2	3	4	5	6	7	8	9	10	Final
Norway (Nordby) 🔨	2	0	0	2	2	1	1	X	X	X	8
Japan (Onodera)	0	1	1	0	0	0	0	X	X	X	2

=== Draw 2 ===
March 19, 2005 15:00

Sheet A	1	2	3	4	5	6	7	8	9	10	11	Final
Sweden (Norberg)	0	1	0	1	0	0	1	4	1	0	1	9
Russia (Jarkova) 🔨	1	0	1	0	4	1	0	0	0	1	0	8

Sheet B	1	2	3	4	5	6	7	8	9	10	Final
Japan (Onodera)	1	0	1	0	0	2	0	1	0	0	5
China (Wang) 🔨	0	2	0	0	1	0	1	0	1	2	7

Sheet C	1	2	3	4	5	6	7	8	9	10	Final
Scotland (Wood)	0	2	1	3	1	3	X	X	X	X	10
Denmark (Dupont) 🔨	0	0	0	0	0	0	X	X	X	X	0

Sheet D	1	2	3	4	5	6	7	8	9	10	11	Final
Switzerland (Ott)	0	0	0	0	1	2	0	2	4	0	1	10
Finland (Nykänen) 🔨	0	3	2	0	0	0	1	0	0	3	0	9

=== Draw 3 ===
March 19, 2005 20:00

Sheet A	1	2	3	4	5	6	7	8	9	10	Final
Finland (Nykänen)	0	0	0	1	1	0	X	X	X	X	2
Canada (Jones) 🔨	3	2	1	0	0	3	X	X	X	X	9

Sheet B	1	2	3	4	5	6	7	8	9	10	Final
Denmark (Dupont)	0	0	0	0	2	1	0	0	1	1	5
United States (Johnson) 🔨	2	0	0	1	0	0	1	2	0	0	6

Sheet C	1	2	3	4	5	6	7	8	9	10	Final
China (Wang)	0	0	0	0	1	0	1	0	0	X	2
Norway (Nordby) 🔨	0	2	0	1	0	3	0	1	0	X	7

Sheet D	1	2	3	4	5	6	7	8	9	10	Final
Russia (Jarkova)	0	0	2	0	2	0	1	0	0	3	8
Italy (Gaspari) 🔨	0	1	0	2	0	3	0	0	1	0	7

=== Draw 5 ===
March 20, 2005 14:00

Sheet A	1	2	3	4	5	6	7	8	9	10	Final
Italy (Gaspari) 🔨	0	0	0	0	2	0	1	0	1	0	4
Japan (Onodera)	0	1	0	1	0	2	0	1	0	1	6

Sheet B	1	2	3	4	5	6	7	8	9	10	Final
Norway (Nordby) 🔨	0	0	0	0	0	4	0	1	0	0	5
Sweden (Norberg)	1	0	1	1	1	0	0	0	1	1	6

Sheet C	1	2	3	4	5	6	7	8	9	10	Final
United States (Johnson) 🔨	2	0	3	0	2	0	2	0	0	1	10
Switzerland (Ott)	0	1	0	2	0	1	0	1	2	0	7

Sheet D	1	2	3	4	5	6	7	8	9	10	Final
Canada (Jones) 🔨	0	0	0	0	2	1	0	X	X	X	3
Scotland (Wood)	1	2	1	1	0	0	5	X	X	X	10

=== Draw 6 ===
March 20, 2005 19:00

Sheet A	1	2	3	4	5	6	7	8	9	10	Final
Denmark (Dupont) 🔨	0	1	0	0	0	0	X	X	X	X	1
Norway (Nordby)	1	0	1	2	6	2	X	X	X	X	12

Sheet B	1	2	3	4	5	6	7	8	9	10	Final
Finland (Nykänen) 🔨	1	0	0	0	0	1	0	3	0	0	5
Italy (Gaspari)	0	1	2	1	1	0	1	0	1	2	9

Sheet C	1	2	3	4	5	6	7	8	9	10	Final
Russia (Jarkova) 🔨	1	1	0	0	3	1	0	2	0	0	8
Canada (Jones)	0	0	1	4	0	0	1	0	2	1	9

Sheet D	1	2	3	4	5	6	7	8	9	10	Final
China (Wang) 🔨	0	1	0	0	1	0	1	0	1	0	4
United States (Johnson)	1	0	0	2	0	1	0	1	0	2	7

=== Draw 7 ===
March 21, 2005 09:30

Sheet A	1	2	3	4	5	6	7	8	9	10	Final
Russia (Jarkova)	0	1	0	0	0	1	0	2	0	0	4
United States (Johnson) 🔨	1	0	0	1	0	0	2	0	0	1	5

Sheet B	1	2	3	4	5	6	7	8	9	10	Final
China (Wang)	0	1	0	0	0	0	0	X	X	X	1
Canada (Jones) 🔨	2	0	2	2	1	3	1	X	X	X	11

Sheet C	1	2	3	4	5	6	7	8	9	10	Final
Denmark (Dupont)	0	1	0	0	0	1	1	1	0	1	5
Italy (Gaspari) 🔨	1	0	1	0	0	0	0	0	1	0	3

Sheet D	1	2	3	4	5	6	7	8	9	10	Final
Finland (Nykänen)	0	0	0	1	1	0	X	X	X	X	2
Norway (Nordby) 🔨	4	1	2	0	0	2	X	X	X	X	9

=== Draw 8 ===
March 21, 2005 14:00

Sheet A	1	2	3	4	5	6	7	8	9	10	Final
Scotland (Wood)	1	1	0	0	0	0	1	0	2	0	5
Finland (Nykänen) 🔨	0	0	2	1	1	1	0	3	0	1	9

Sheet B	1	2	3	4	5	6	7	8	9	10	Final
Switzerland (Ott) 🔨	0	2	0	4	0	0	2	0	2	X	10
Denmark (Dupont)	2	0	1	0	0	1	0	1	0	X	5

Sheet C	1	2	3	4	5	6	7	8	9	10	Final
Sweden (Norberg) 🔨	2	0	0	1	1	1	0	0	2	0	7
China (Wang)	0	0	2	0	0	0	1	1	0	2	6

Sheet D	1	2	3	4	5	6	7	8	9	10	11	Final
Japan (Onodera) 🔨	0	2	0	2	0	0	1	0	0	1	0	6
Russia (Jarkova)	0	0	2	0	2	0	0	1	1	0	2	8

=== Draw 9 ===
March 21, 2005 19:00

Sheet A	1	2	3	4	5	6	7	8	9	10	Final
Canada (Jones)	0	0	3	0	1	0	0	1	0	X	5
Sweden (Norberg) 🔨	3	1	0	3	0	1	1	0	1	X	10

Sheet B	1	2	3	4	5	6	7	8	9	10	Final
United States (Johnson)	2	2	3	2	3	0	X	X	X	X	12
Japan (Onodera) 🔨	0	0	0	0	0	1	X	X	X	X	1

Sheet C	1	2	3	4	5	6	7	8	9	10	11	Final
Norway (Nordby)	0	0	0	1	2	0	1	0	3	0	1	8
Scotland (Wood) 🔨	0	1	1	0	0	2	0	2	0	1	0	7

Sheet D	1	2	3	4	5	6	7	8	9	10	Final
Italy (Gaspari)	0	0	0	1	0	0	X	X	X	X	1
Switzerland (Ott) 🔨	2	2	2	0	1	2	X	X	X	X	9

=== Draw 10 ===
March 22, 2005 09:30

Sheet A	1	2	3	4	5	6	7	8	9	10	Final
Norway (Nordby) 🔨	0	0	1	0	1	1	0	2	3	2	10
Switzerland (Ott)	0	0	0	3	0	0	1	0	0	0	4

Sheet B	1	2	3	4	5	6	7	8	9	10	Final
Italy (Gaspari)	0	0	0	0	1	0	X	X	X	X	1
Scotland (Wood) 🔨	1	2	1	3	0	1	X	X	X	X	8

Sheet C	1	2	3	4	5	6	7	8	9	10	Final
Canada (Jones)	2	3	0	0	3	0	0	1	0	4	13
Japan (Onodera) 🔨	0	0	3	1	0	1	1	0	1	0	7

Sheet D	1	2	3	4	5	6	7	8	9	10	11	Final
United States (Johnson) 🔨	1	0	0	0	0	1	0	0	1	1	0	4
Sweden (Norberg)	0	0	0	2	0	0	0	2	0	0	2	6

=== Draw 11 ===
March 22, 2005 14:00

Sheet A	1	2	3	4	5	6	7	8	9	10	Final
China (Wang) 🔨	1	0	0	1	0	0	X	X	X	X	2
Italy (Gaspari)	0	3	3	0	3	1	X	X	X	X	10

Sheet B	1	2	3	4	5	6	7	8	9	10	Final
Russia (Jarkova) 🔨	1	0	0	1	0	0	2	0	3	1	8
Norway (Nordby)	0	0	1	0	1	2	0	1	0	0	5

Sheet C	1	2	3	4	5	6	7	8	9	10	Final
Finland (Nykänen) 🔨	1	0	0	0	0	2	1	0	0	X	4
United States (Johnson)	0	1	3	1	2	0	0	1	1	X	9

Sheet D	1	2	3	4	5	6	7	8	9	10	Final
Denmark (Dupont) 🔨	0	2	1	0	0	0	0	0	X	X	3
Canada (Jones)	1	0	0	1	1	2	2	2	X	X	9

=== Draw 12 ===
March 22, 2005 19:00

Sheet A	1	2	3	4	5	6	7	8	9	10	Final
Japan (Onodera)	3	0	1	0	0	4	1	0	0	2	11
Denmark (Dupont) 🔨	0	2	0	1	3	0	0	4	0	0	10

Sheet B	1	2	3	4	5	6	7	8	9	10	Final
Sweden (Norberg)	0	4	2	0	0	2	3	X	X	X	11
Finland (Nykänen) 🔨	2	0	0	1	1	0	0	X	X	X	4

Sheet C	1	2	3	4	5	6	7	8	9	10	Final
Switzerland (Ott) 🔨	0	1	0	1	0	2	1	0	1	0	6
Russia (Jarkova)	0	0	2	0	2	0	0	2	0	1	7

Sheet D	1	2	3	4	5	6	7	8	9	10	Final
Scotland (Wood)	0	0	0	2	0	0	2	0	X	X	4
China (Wang) 🔨	2	2	2	0	2	1	0	3	X	X	12

=== Draw 13 ===
March 23, 2005 09:30

Sheet A	1	2	3	4	5	6	7	8	9	10	Final
Scotland (Wood)	0	0	2	0	2	0	1	0	1	1	7
Sweden (Norberg) 🔨	2	2	0	2	0	0	0	2	0	0	8

Sheet B	1	2	3	4	5	6	7	8	9	10	Final
Japan (Onodera) 🔨	2	0	0	0	0	2	0	X	X	X	4
Switzerland (Ott)	0	4	3	1	1	0	3	X	X	X	12

Sheet C	1	2	3	4	5	6	7	8	9	10	Final
Canada (Jones) 🔨	5	1	0	0	0	0	5	X	X	X	11
Italy (Gaspari)	0	0	1	1	1	1	0	X	X	X	4

Sheet D	1	2	3	4	5	6	7	8	9	10	Final
Norway (Nordby)	0	0	0	0	0	1	2	0	X	X	3
United States (Johnson) 🔨	2	0	1	2	2	0	0	1	X	X	8

=== Draw 14 ===
March 23, 2005 14:00

Sheet B	1	2	3	4	5	6	7	8	9	10	Final
United States (Johnson)	0	0	3	0	0	2	2	0	1	2	10
Canada (Jones) 🔨	1	0	0	2	1	0	0	3	0	0	7

Sheet C	1	2	3	4	5	6	7	8	9	10	11	Final
Denmark (Dupont) 🔨	0	3	2	1	0	0	0	0	1	0	1	8
China (Wang)	0	0	0	0	2	1	1	1	0	2	0	7

Sheet D	1	2	3	4	5	6	7	8	9	10	Final
Russia (Jarkova)	0	3	1	1	2	3	X	X	X	X	10
Finland (Nykänen) 🔨	1	0	0	0	0	0	X	X	X	X	1

=== Draw 15 ===
March 23, 2005 19:00

Sheet A	1	2	3	4	5	6	7	8	9	10	Final
Italy (Gaspari) 🔨	1	0	0	1	0	0	1	0	1	X	4
Norway (Nordby)	0	0	4	0	2	1	0	1	0	X	8

Sheet B	1	2	3	4	5	6	7	8	9	10	11	Final
China (Wang)	0	0	1	1	0	0	0	0	0	2	0	4
Russia (Jarkova) 🔨	0	3	0	0	0	0	0	1	0	0	1	5

Sheet C	1	2	3	4	5	6	7	8	9	10	Final
Switzerland (Ott)	0	0	1	0	1	0	0	2	0	0	4
Scotland (Wood) 🔨	0	1	0	1	0	1	1	0	1	1	6

Sheet D	1	2	3	4	5	6	7	8	9	10	Final
Sweden (Norberg) 🔨	0	2	0	2	1	0	0	1	0	1	7
Japan (Onodera)	0	0	1	0	0	2	1	0	1	0	5

=== Draw 16 ===
March 24, 2005 09:30

Sheet A	1	2	3	4	5	6	7	8	9	10	Final
Finland (Nykänen)	0	0	0	2	0	1	0	1	0	X	4
Denmark (Dupont) 🔨	2	2	1	0	2	0	2	0	1	X	10

Sheet C	1	2	3	4	5	6	7	8	9	10	Final
Italy (Gaspari) 🔨	0	2	0	1	1	0	0	1	0	0	5
United States (Johnson)	2	0	2	0	0	0	1	0	2	2	9

Sheet D	1	2	3	4	5	6	7	8	9	10	11	Final
Canada (Jones)	0	3	0	0	2	0	1	1	0	3	1	11
Norway (Nordby) 🔨	1	0	1	1	0	5	0	0	2	0	0	10

=== Draw 17 ===
March 24, 2005 14:00

Sheet A	1	2	3	4	5	6	7	8	9	10	Final
Sweden (Norberg)	0	1	0	1	0	0	1	1	3	2	9
Switzerland (Ott) 🔨	0	0	1	0	1	1	0	0	0	0	3

Sheet B	1	2	3	4	5	6	7	8	9	10	11	Final
Scotland (Wood) 🔨	0	2	0	2	0	1	0	1	0	2	1	9
Japan (Onodera)	0	0	2	0	2	0	3	0	1	0	0	8

Sheet C	1	2	3	4	5	6	7	8	9	10	Final
Russia (Jarkova) 🔨	1	0	0	3	0	0	0	1	0	3	8
Denmark (Dupont)	0	0	1	0	0	1	1	0	1	0	4

Sheet D	1	2	3	4	5	6	7	8	9	10	Final
Finland (Nykänen)	0	3	0	1	0	0	0	1	1	0	6
China (Wang) 🔨	1	0	1	0	2	0	1	0	0	3	8

=== Draw 4 ===
March 25, 2005 09:30
Originally scheduled for March 20, 2005

Sheet A	1	2	3	4	5	6	7	8	9	10	Final
Switzerland (Ott) 🔨	1	0	2	0	0	0	1	0	0	0	4
China (Wang)	0	1	0	1	0	1	0	4	1	2	10

Sheet B	1	2	3	4	5	6	7	8	9	10	Final
Scotland (Wood) 🔨	2	0	0	2	0	1	0	0	1	4	10
Russia (Jarkova)	0	0	1	0	1	0	1	1	0	0	4

Sheet C	1	2	3	4	5	6	7	8	9	10	Final
Japan (Onodera) 🔨	3	0	3	3	2	1	X	X	X	X	12
Finland (Nykänen)	0	2	0	0	0	0	X	X	X	X	2

Sheet D	1	2	3	4	5	6	7	8	9	10	Final
Sweden (Norberg) 🔨	2	1	0	2	1	1	1	X	X	X	8
Denmark (Dupont)	0	0	1	0	0	0	0	X	X	X	1

== Tie-breaker ==
March 25, 2005 14:00

Sheet A	1	2	3	4	5	6	7	8	9	10	Final
Russia (Jarkova) 🔨	0	0	1	0	0	0	1	X	X	X	2
Norway (Nordby)	2	0	0	5	1	2	0	X	X	X	10

Player Percentages
Russia		Norway	
Ekaterina Galkina	75%	Camilla Holth	66%
Iana Nekrassova	68%	Marianne Haslum	68%
Nkeirouka Ezekh	55%	Linn Githmark	80%
Ludmila Privivkova	46%	Dordi Nordby	88%
Total	61%	Total	73%

== Page playoffs ==
For the first time ever, the World championships used the page playoff system where the top four teams with the best records at the end of round-robin play meet in the playoff rounds. The first and second place teams play each other, with the winner advancing directly to the final. The winner of the other page playoff game between the third and fourth place teams plays the loser of the first/second playoff game in the semi-final. The winner of the semi-final moves on to the final.

=== Brackets ===
Page playoff system
1	Sweden	5
2	United States	6
3	Canada	5
4	Norway	12

Semifinal
1	Sweden	10
4	Norway	4

Gold Medal Game
1	Sweden	10
2	United States	4

=== 1 vs. 2 game ===
March 26, 2005 09:30

Sheet C	1	2	3	4	5	6	7	8	9	10	Final
Sweden (Norberg) 🔨	1	0	0	2	1	0	1	0	0	0	5
United States (Johnson)	0	1	1	0	0	1	0	2	0	1	6

Player Percentages
Sweden		United States	
Anna Bergström	73%	Maureen Brunt	76%
Cathrine Lindahl	74%	Jessica Schultz	73%
Eva Lund	65%	Jamie Johnson	70%
Anette Norberg	70%	Cassandra Johnson	75%
Total	70%	Total	73%

=== 3 vs. 4 game ===
March 26, 2005 14:00

Sheet C	1	2	3	4	5	6	7	8	9	10	Final
Canada (Jones) 🔨	2	0	0	1	2	0	0	0	0	0	5
Norway (Nordby)	0	0	2	0	0	3	0	1	3	3	12

Player Percentages
Canada		Norway	
Cathy Gauthier	79%	Camilla Holth	72%
Jill Officer	86%	Marianne Haslum	68%
Cathy Overton-Clapham	68%	Linn Githmark	73%
Jennifer Jones	60%	Dordi Nordby	64%
Total	74%	Total	69%

=== Semifinal ===
March 26, 2005 19:00

Sheet C	1	2	3	4	5	6	7	8	9	10	Final
Sweden (Norberg) 🔨	3	1	0	1	0	3	2	0	X	X	10
Norway (Nordby)	0	0	1	0	2	0	0	1	X	X	4

Player Percentages
Sweden		Norway	
Anna Bergström	63%	Camilla Holth	52%
Cathrine Lindahl	75%	Marianne Haslum	52%
Eva Lund	92%	Linn Githmark	50%
Anette Norberg	73%	Dordi Nordby	55%
Total	73%	Total	52%

=== Final ===
March 27, 2005 15:00

Sheet C	1	2	3	4	5	6	7	8	9	10	Final
Sweden (Norberg) 🔨	0	0	0	1	0	0	3	0	2	4	10
United States (Johnson)	0	0	1	0	1	1	0	1	0	0	4

Player Percentages
Sweden		United States	
Anna Bergström	89%	Maureen Brunt	88%
Cathrine Lindahl	70%	Jessica Schultz	78%
Eva Lund	83%	Jamie Johnson	73%
Anette Norberg	78%	Cassandra Johnson	64%
Total	80%	Total	76%

2005 World Women's Curling Championship winner
(Sweden)
Sweden
6th title

== Round-robin player percentages ==
Leads	%	Seconds	%	Thirds	%	Skips	%
(Sweden) Anna Bergström	78	(United States) Jessica Schultz	78	(United States) Jamie Johnson	75	(Sweden) Anette Norberg	74
(United States) Maureen Brunt	78	(Sweden) Cathrine Lindahl	76	(Norway) Linn Githmark	74	(United States) Cassandra Johnson	74
(Switzerland) Michèle Knobel	77	(Switzerland) Brigitte Schori	74	(Sweden) Eva Lund	73	(Norway) Dordi Nordby	70
(Russia) Ekaterina Galkina	76	(Norway) Marianne Haslum	70	(Russia) Nkeirouka Ezekh	69	(Canada) Jennifer Jones	68
(China) Zhou Yan	76	(China) Liu Yin	69	(Scotland) Lorna Vevers	69	(Scotland) Kelly Wood	68
