= Katarina Nyberg =

Swedish curler

- Curler
- Other names: Anna Katarina Nyberg
- Born: 16 November 1965 (age 60); Örnsköldsvik, Sweden
Medal record
Women's curling
Representing Sweden
Olympic Games
| Bronze medal – third place | 1998 Nagano |
World Championships
| Gold medal – first place | 1992 Garmisch-Partenkirchen |
| Gold medal – first place | 1995 Brandon |
| Gold medal – first place | 1998 Kamloops |
| Gold medal – first place | 1999 Saint John |
| Bronze medal – third place | 1993 Geneva |
| Bronze medal – third place | 1994 Oberstdorf |
European Championships
| Gold medal – first place | 1992 Perth |
| Gold medal – first place | 1993 Leukerbad |
| Gold medal – first place | 1997 Füssen |
| Gold medal – first place | 2000 Oberstdorf |
| Silver medal – second place | 1996 Copenhagen |
| Bronze medal – third place | 1995 Grindelwald |

Anna Katarina Nyberg (born 16 November 1965) is a Swedish curler, world champion and Olympic medalist. She received a bronze medal at the 1998 Winter Olympics in Nagano.

In 1993 she was inducted into the Swedish Curling Hall of Fame and in 2020 she and the rest of Team Gustafson were inducted into the World Curling Hall of Fame.
