= Elisabet Gustafson =

Swedish curler and Olympic medalist

- Curler
- Other names: Karin Elisabet Gustafson
- Born: Karin Elisabet Johansson; 2 May 1964 (age 62); Umeå, Sweden

Curling career
- World Championship: 8 (1992, 1993, 1994, 1995, 1996, 1998, 1999, 2000)
- European Championship: 6 (1992, 1993, 1995, 1996, 1997, 2000)
- Olympic: 2 (1998, 2002)
Medal record
Women's curling
Representing Sweden
Olympic Games
Bronze medal – third place	1998 Nagano
World Championships
Gold medal – first place	1992 Garmisch-Partenkirchen
Gold medal – first place	1995 Brandon
Gold medal – first place	1998 Kamloops
Gold medal – first place	1999 Saint John
Bronze medal – third place	1993 Geneva
Bronze medal – third place	1994 Oberstdorf
European Championships
Gold medal – first place	1992 Perth
Gold medal – first place	1993 Leukerbad
Gold medal – first place	1997 Füssen
Gold medal – first place	2000 Oberstdorf
Silver medal – second place	1996 Copenhagen
Bronze medal – third place	1995 Grindelwald

Karin Elisabet Gustafson (born 2 May 1964) is a retired Swedish curler, world champion and Olympic medalist. She has won four World Championships.

== Career ==
Gustafson made her debut onto the world stage at the 1985 European Junior Curling Championships, where she finished in fourth place. She then skipped one of the most dominant teams of the 1990s, winning four World Curling Championships and four European Curling Championships in the span of eight years. As of 2017 her four World Curling Championships is still an all time record, and each was won with the same team.

Her most dramatic victory was at the 1995 World Curling Championships in Brandon where facing hometown favorite Connie Laliberte of Canada, she overcame a 6-4 deficit without hammer to win, stealing 3 consecutive ends including the extra end.

She received a bronze medal at the 1998 Winter Olympics in Nagano. There she had come in co-favored for the gold along with Sandra Schmirler and finished tied with Schmirler atop round robin at 6-1 (Schmirler taking 1st place and the hammer in the playoffs due to winning the round robin meeting of the two teams), but lost in the semis in a significant upset to the team of Helena Blach Lavrsen of Denmark. She gained revenge on this same team a month later, defeating them in the finals of the 1998 World Curling Championships for her 3rd World title

She retired from the sport after finishing a disappointing sixth place at the 2002 Winter Games. Here as in 1998, she was one of the heavy favorites for a possible gold medal, but barely made the playoffs after finishing in a four way tie for 4th at 5-4, then lost in a tiebreaker game to the eventual gold medalists Rhona Martin of Scotland.

In 1993 she was inducted into the Swedish Curling Hall of Fame. In 2012 Gustafson was inducted into the WCF Hall of Fame and in 2020 she was inducted again with her team.

== Personal life ==
Gustafson is a medical doctor and trained as a surgeon. She is married to Tomas Gustafson, an Olympic World Champion speed skater.

At the time of the 1999 World Championships, Gustafson was living in Örebro.
