= Hanne Woods =

Norwegian curler

- Curler
- Other names: Hanne Pettersen
- Born: 19 March 1960 (age 66); Oslo, Norway

Curling career
- World Championship: 15 (1982, 1989, 1990, 1991, 1992, 1993, 1995, 1996, 1997, 1998, 1999, 2000, 2001, 2002, 2003)
- European Championship: 19 (1981, 1982, 1983, 1985, 1986, 1987, 1988, 1989, 1990, 1993, 1994, 1996, 1997, 1998, 1999, 2000, 2001, 2002, 2003)
Medal record
Women's curling
Representing Norway
Olympic Games
Silver medal – second place	1992 Albertville (demonstration)
Bronze medal – third place	1988 Calgary (demonstration)
World Championships
Gold medal – first place	1990 Västerås
Gold medal – first place	1991 Winnipeg
Silver medal – second place	1989 Milwaukee
Silver medal – second place	1997 Berne
Bronze medal – third place	1993 Geneva
Bronze medal – third place	1995 Brandon
Bronze medal – third place	1996 Hamilton
Bronze medal – third place	2000 Glasgow
Bronze medal – third place	2002 Bismarck
European Curling Championships
Gold medal – first place	1990 Lillehammer
Gold medal – first place	1999 Chamonix
Silver medal – second place	1983 Västerås
Silver medal – second place	2000 Oberstdorf
Bronze medal – third place	1985 Grindelwald
Bronze medal – third place	1987 Oberstdorf
Bronze medal – third place	1993 Leukerbad
Bronze medal – third place	1994 Sundsvall
Bronze medal – third place	2002 Grindelwald

Hanne Woods (née Pettersen, born 19 March 1960) is a Norwegian former world champion in curling.

== International championships ==
Hanne Woods competed several times at the World Curling Championships, mostly with skip Dordi Nordby. She obtained a total of nine medals, including two gold medals. In 1990 winning against Scotland in the world championship final, and in the 1991 final winning against Canada.

She received nine medals in the European Curling Championships, including gold medals in 1990 and 1999.

== Olympics ==
She participated at the demonstration event at the 1988 Winter Olympics, finishing third, and again at the demonstration event at the 1992 Winter Olympics, finishing second.

== See also ==
- List of World Curling Women's Champions
