= Linn Githmark =

Norwegian curler

- Curler
- Born: 26 September 1982 (age 44); Oslo, Norway

Team
- Curling club: Snarøen CC, Oslo
- Skip: Linn Githmark
- Third: Henriette Løvar
- Second: Ingrid Stensrud
- Lead: Kristin Skaslien
- Alternate: Kristin Tøsse Løvseth

Curling career
- World Championship: 4 (2004, 2005, 2010, 2011)
- World Mixed Doubles Championship: 1 (2008)
- European Championship: 5 (2004, 2009, 2010, 2011, 2012)
Medal record
Curling
Representing Norway
World Women's Curling Championships
Silver medal – second place	2004 Gävle
Bronze medal – third place	2005 Paisley
European Championships
Bronze medal – third place	2004 Sofia
World Junior Curling Championships
Gold medal – first place	2004 Trois-Rivières
Winter Universiade
Bronze medal – third place	2003 Tarvisio

Linn Catharina Cavallius Githmark (born 26 September 1982) is a Norwegian curler who has skipped her country to a world junior title, and also played on the Norwegian team that won a silver medal at the world championships.

Githmark played on the teams representing Norway in world junior championships from 1997 to 2004, and was skip on all but two occasions. She led her team to the gold medal in 2004.

Githmark made her world championship debut in 2004, taking Hanne Woods' place as third on the team skipped by former world champion Dordi Nordby. Norway won the silver medal at the 2004 world championship, followed by bronze medals at the European Championships later in the year, and at the 2005 worlds.

Githmark posed for Ana Arce's "Fire on Ice" 2007 Team Sponsorship Calendar to promote women's curling.

Githmark represented Norway at the inaugural 2008 World Mixed Doubles Curling Championship, partnered with her father Tormod Andreassen.
