= 1997 European Curling Championships =

- Host city: Füssen, Germany
- Arena: Bundesleistungszentrum
- Dates: December 6–13
- Men's winner: Germany
- Curling club: CC Füssen, Füssen
- Skip: Andy Kapp
- Third: Uli Kapp
- Second: Oliver Axnick
- Lead: Holger Höhne
- Alternate: Michael Schäffer
- Coach: Keith Wendorf
- Finalist: Denmark
- Women's winner: Sweden
- Curling club: Umeå CK, Umeå
- Skip: Elisabet Gustafson
- Third: Katarina Nyberg
- Second: Louise Marmont
- Lead: Elisabeth Persson
- Alternate: Margaretha Lindahl
- Coach: Jan Strandlund
- Finalist: Denmark

The 1997 European Curling Championships were held from December 6 to 13 at the Bundesleistungszentrum in Füssen, Germany.

== Men's ==
=== A Tournament ===
==== Group A ====
Team	Skip	W	L
Scotland	Douglas Dryburgh	4	1
Denmark	Ulrik Schmidt	4	1
Germany	Andy Kapp	4	1
England	Martyn Deakin	2	3
Netherlands	Floris van Imhoff	1	4
Austria	Alois Kreidl	0	5

==== Group B ====
Team	Skip	W	L
Sweden	Peja Lindholm	4	1
Finland	Markku Uusipaavalniemi	4	1
Switzerland	Patrick Hürlimann	3	2
Norway	Thomas Ulsrud	2	3
Luxembourg	Hanjörg Bless	2	3
Italy	Claudio Pescia	0	5

=== B Tournament ===
==== Group A ====
Team	Skip	W	L
Wales	Adrian Meikle	4	0
France	Jan Henri Ducroz	3	1
Russia	Alexey Tselousov	2	2
Czech Republic	David Sik	1	3
Bulgaria	Bojidar Momerin	0	4

=== Playoffs ===
Quarterfinal
Scotland	9
Norway	5
Germany	6
Finland	5
Sweden	6
Wales	5
Denmark	7
Switzerland	5

Semi-final
Scotland	2
Germany	4
Sweden	7
Denmark	8

Final
Germany	10
Denmark	5

Bronze medal
Scotland	6
Sweden	5

== Women's ==
=== Group A ===
Team	Skip	W	L
Switzerland	Graziella Grichting	5	0
Scotland	Kirsty Hay	4	1
Norway	Dordi Nordby	3	2
Luxembourg	Karen Wauters	2	3
Italy	Giulia Lacedelli	1	4
France	Audé Bénier	0	5

=== Group B ===
Team	Skip	W	L
Germany	Andrea Schöpp	3	1
Denmark	Helena Blach Lavrsen	3	1
Sweden	Elisabet Gustafson	2	2
Finland	Jaana Jokela	2	2
Czech Republic	Lenka Sáfránková	0	4

=== B Tournament ===
==== Group A ====
Team	Skip	W	L
England	Joan Reed	3	1
Netherlands	Beatrice Miltenburg	2	2
Russia	Ekaterina Lissitskaia	1	3

=== Playoffs ===
Quarterfinal
Sweden	9
Scotland	3
Germany	8
England	2
Finland	9
Switzerland	7
Denmark	12
Norway	4

Semi-final
Sweden	5
Germany	4
Finland	6
Denmark	7

Final
Sweden	6
Denmark	4

Bronze medal
Germany	9
Finland	5
