= Kristin Tøsse Løvseth =

Norwegian curler (born 1973)

- Curler
- Born: 6 April 1973 (age 53); Lillehammer, Norway

Team
- Curling club: Stabekk CC, Oslo
- Skip: Linn Githmark
- Third: Henriette Løvar
- Second: Ingrid Stensrud
- Lead: Kristin Skaslien
- Alternate: Kristin Tøsse Løvseth

Curling career
- Member Association: Norway
- World Championship: 8 (1996, 1997, 1998, 1999, 2000, 2001, 2009, 2010)
- European Championship: 7 (1995, 1996, 1997, 1998, 2000, 2001, 2008)
- Olympic: 1 (1998)
Medal record
Curling
World Curling Championships
Silver medal – second place	1997 Bern
Bronze medal – third place	1996 Hamilton
Bronze medal – third place	2000 Glasgow
European Championships
Silver medal – second place	2000 Obersdorf

Kristin Tøsse Løvseth (born 6 April 1973 in Lillehammer) is a Norwegian curler.

At the international level, she competed as a member of Norway women's team on 1998 Winter Olympics (they finished on fifth place), on eight World championships (best result - silver medals in 1997) and seven European championships (best result - silver medals in 2000).
