= Dordi Nordby =

Norwegian curler

- Curler
- Other names: Dordi Agate Nordby
- Born: 8 April 1964 (age 62); Bærum, Norway

Curling career
- World Championship: 18 (1982, 1989, 1990, 1991, 1992, 1993, 1995, 1996, 1997, 1998, 1999, 2000, 2001, 2002, 2003, 2004, 2005, 2006)
- European Championship: 23 (1981, 1983, 1985, 1986, 1987, 1988, 1989, 1990, 1993, 1994, 1995, 1996, 1997, 1998, 1999, 2000, 2001, 2002, 2003, 2004, 2005, 2006, 2007)
- Olympic: 5 (1988, 1992, 1998, 2002, 2006)
Medal record
Women's curling
Representing Norway
Olympic Games
Silver medal – second place	1992 Albertville (demonstration)
Bronze medal – third place	1988 Calgary (demonstration)
World Championships
Gold medal – first place	1990 Västerås
Gold medal – first place	1991 Winnipeg
Silver medal – second place	1989 Milwaukee
Silver medal – second place	1997 Berne
Silver medal – second place	2004 Gävle
Bronze medal – third place	1993 Geneva
Bronze medal – third place	1995 Brandon
Bronze medal – third place	1996 Hamilton
Bronze medal – third place	2000 Glasgow
Bronze medal – third place	2002 Bismarck
Bronze medal – third place	2005 Paisley
European Championships
Gold medal – first place	1990 Lillehammer
Gold medal – first place	1999 Chamonix
Silver medal – second place	1983 Västerås
Silver medal – second place	2000 Oberstdorf
Bronze medal – third place	1985 Grindelwald
Bronze medal – third place	1987 Oberstdorf
Bronze medal – third place	1993 Leukerbad
Bronze medal – third place	1994 Sundsvall
Bronze medal – third place	2002 Grindelwald
Bronze medal – third place	2004 Sofia

Dordi Agate Nordby (born 8 April 1964 in Bærum) is a retired Norwegian curler from Snarøya. Nordby has amassed an array of medals in major international competitions over a career spanning three decades, including two world championship gold medals and two European championship gold medals.

== Career ==
Having made her international debut for Norway as early as 1981, Nordby played for her country at the curling exhibition event in the Calgary Winter Olympics, where the team won a 'bronze medal' - which of course had no official status. She first won a medal at the world championships in 1989, playing third in the Norway team that finished as runners-up. As skip of the team in 1990 and 1991, Dordi reached the pinnacle of her career to date by leading Norway to back-to-back gold medals.

Although she has yet to quite recapture that form, the Norway team she has almost invariably continued to skip at major championships has maintained a remarkable consistency, netting bronze medals in 1993, 1995, 1996, 2000 and 2002, and a silver in 1997. She has so far, however, failed in her quest to win a 'real' Olympic medal for Norway, finishing fifth in Nagano in 1998, seventh in Salt Lake City in 2002, and fourth in Turin in 2006.

Nordby suffered a blow when the international career of her long-term lieutenant Hanne Woods finally succumbed to a long-term knee complaint. However, the promising junior Linn Githmark was co-opted to play third in the team at the 2004 World Championships, and a transition was successfully achieved as Norway picked up a silver medal, with yet another bronze following in 2005. However, as of the 2005 European Championships, Githmark is no longer on the team.

In 2003 Nordby won the Frances Brodie Award, which is an award that is presented to the player deemed to have displayed the best sportsmanship throughout the championship, as voted on by all of the players competing. She also brings a thermos of coffee to every game she plays, and used to be a chain-smoker, but says she has quit smoking after 25 years. Nordby has said she will continue curling until "my knees break". However, after a disappointing 2006 European Curling Championships in which she failed to qualify Norway for the 2007 Worlds, Nordby announced her retirement from the sport in January 2007.

In 2019 Nordby was inducted into the World Curling Hall of Fame, and was awarded the Elmer Freytag Award.
