= Camilla Holth =

Norwegian curler

Medal record

Representing Norway

Women's Curling

World championships
Silver medal – second place	2004 Gävle	Team
Bronze medal – third place	2002 Bismark	Team
Bronze medal – third place	2005 Paisley	Team

European championships
Silver medal – second place	2000 Oberstdorf	
Bronze medal – third place	2002 Grindelwald	
Bronze medal – third place	2004 Sofia	

Camilla Holth (born 25 December 1978) is a Norwegian curler. She won a silver medal at the 2004 World Curling Championships.
