= Marianne Haslum =

Norwegian curler

Marianne Haslum (born 31 January 1974 in Lillehammer, Norway) is a Norwegian curler.

At major championships, she won bronze medals in 1993, 1995, 1996, 2000 and 2002, and silver in 1997 and 2004. She has so far, however, failed in her quest to win an Olympic medal for Norway, finishing fifth in the Nagano Olympics in 1998, seventh in the Salt Lake City Olympics in 2002, and fourth in the Torino Olympics in 2006.

== Team mates ==
- Dordi Nordby (skip)
- Marianne Rørvik (second)
- Camilla Holth (lead)
- Charlotte Hovring (alternate)
