= Marianne Aspelin =

Norwegian curler (born 1966)

- Curler
- Other names: Marianne Aspelin Berntzen
- Born: 4 April 1966 (age 60); Lørenskog, Norway
Medal record
Women's curling
Representing Norway
Olympic Games
Silver medal – second place	1992 Albertville (demonstration)
World Championships
Gold medal – first place	1991 Winnipeg
Silver medal – second place	1997 Berne
Bronze medal – third place	1993 Geneva
European Championships
Gold medal – first place	1999 Chamonix
Bronze medal – third place	1993 Leukerbad
Bronze medal – third place	1994 Sundsvall

Marianne Aspelin (married name Berntzen, 4 April 1966 in Lørenskog) is a Norwegian curler and World Champion. She won a gold medal at the 1991 World Curling Championships.
