= Helena Blach Lavrsen =

Danish curler

Personal information
- Nationality: Danish
- Born: Helena Blach; 7 June 1963 (age 62) Frederiksberg, Denmark

Sport
- Sport: Curling

Helena Blach Lavrsen
Medal record

Representing Denmark

Women's Curling

Olympic Games
Silver medal – second place	1998 Nagano	Team

World Championships
Gold medal – first place	1982 Geneva	Team
Silver medal – second place	1998 Kamloops	Team
Bronze medal – third place	1990 Oslo	Team
Bronze medal – third place	1997 Berne	Team

European Championships
Gold medal – first place	1994 Sundsvall	Team
Silver medal – second place	1997 Füssen	Team
Bronze medal – third place	1981 Grindelwald	Team
Bronze medal – third place	1998 Flims	Team

Helena Blach Lavrsen (née Blach; born 7 June 1963) is a Danish curler, several times the skip for the Danish team, an Olympic medalist, and World and European champion. She received a silver medal at the 1998 Winter Olympics in Nagano. This was the first medal, Denmark has ever won at a Winter Olympics, and the only one until 2026, when Viktor Hald Thorup won silver medals at the 2026 Olympics. She has obtained four medals at the World Curling Championships, and is European champion from 1994.

Blach Lavrsen was the flag bearer for Denmark at the 1998 Winter Olympics opening ceremony.
