= Fredrik Nyman =

Swedish curler (born 1995)

- Curler
- Born: 7 February 1995 (age 31); Skellefteå

Team
- Curling club: Skellefteå CK, Skellefteå
- Skip: Fredrik Nyman
- Third: Patric Mabergs
- Second: Simon Granbom
- Lead: Johannes Patz

Curling career
- Member Association: Sweden
- Other appearances: World Junior Championships: (2013, 2014, 2015, 2016), Winter Universiade: 2 (2017, 2019)
Medal record
Curling
Swedish Men's Championship
Gold medal – first place	2024 Jönköping
Gold medal – first place	2026 Umeå
Silver medal – second place	2019 Jönköping
Bronze medal – third place	2025 Härnösand
Bronze medal – third place	2014 Umeå
Bronze medal – third place	2016 Piteå
Bronze medal – third place	2023 Karlstad

Fredrik Emanuel Nyman (born 7 February 1995) is a Swedish curler.

He is a 2024 Swedish men's champion, a 2023 Swedish mixed champion and three-time Swedish junior men's champion (2014, 2015, 2016). He has competed in four World Junior Championships and two Winter Universiades.

At the World Junior Championships 2016 he received the Sportsmanship Award.

== Teams ==
=== Men's ===
Season	Skip	Third	Second	Lead	Alternate	Coach	Events
2012–13	Victor Martinsson (fourth)	Max Bäck	Simon Granbom	Fredrik Nyman (skip)		Hans Nyman	SMCC 2013 (12th)
2012–13	Patric Mabergs (fourth)	Gustav Eskilsson (skip)	Jesper Johansson	Johannes Patz	Fredrik Nyman	Flemming Patz	WJCC 2013 (4th)
2013–14	Marcus Hasselborg	Peder Folke	Andreas Prytz	Anton Sandström	Fredrik Nyman		SMCC 2014 (bronze)
2013–14	Fredrik Nyman	Simon Granbom	Johannes Patz	Victor Martinsson	Max Bäck (WJCC)	Hans Nyman	SJCC 2014 (gold); WJCC 2014 (6th)
2014–15	Fredrik Nyman	Simon Granbom	Johannes Patz	Victor Martinsson	Max Bäck (WJCC)	Hans Nyman	SJCC 2015 (gold); WJCC 2015 (4th)
2014–15	Marcus Hasselborg	Vincent Stenberg	Fredrik Nyman	Anton Sandström			SMCC 2015 (5th)
2015–16	Rasmus Wranå	Fredrik Nyman	Jordan Wåhlin	Joakim Flyg	Max Bäck		SMCC 2016 (bronze); SJCC 2016 (gold)
2015–16	Rasmus Wranå	Fredrik Nyman	Jordan Wåhlin	Max Bäck	Axel Sjöberg	Mats Wranå	WJCC 2016 (6th)
2016–17	Patric Mabergs (fourth)	Gustav Eskilsson (skip)	Fredrik Nyman	Johannes Patz		Flemming Patz	WUG 2017 (silver)
2017–18	Patric Mabergs	Fredrik Nyman	Vincent Stenberg	Johannes Patz			SMCC 2018 (7th)
2018–19	Fredrik Nyman	Rasmus Wranå	Axel Sjöberg	Max Bäck		Olle Brudsten	WUG 2019 (5th)
2018–19	Fredrik Nyman	Axel Sjöberg	Max Bäck	Victor Martinsson		Olle Brudsten	SMCC 2019 (silver)
2019–20	Patric Mabergs	Fredrik Nyman	Fredrik Carlsen	Johannes Patz			
2019–20	Fredrik Nyman	Patric Mabergs	Johannes Patz	Simon Olofsson			SMCC 2020 (5th)
2020–21	Fredrik Nyman	Albin Eriksson	Simon Olofsson	Johannes Patz			
2021–22	Fredrik Nyman	Albin Eriksson	Simon Olofsson	Johannes Patz			
2022–23	Fredrik Nyman	Patric Mabergs	Simon Olofsson	Johannes Patz			SMCC 2023 (bronze)
2023–24	Fredrik Nyman	Patric Mabergs	Simon Olofsson	Johannes Patz		Rickard Hallström	SMCC 2024 (gold)
2024–25	Fredrik Nyman	Patric Mabergs	Simon Olofsson	Johannes Patz		Rickard Hallström	
2025–26	Fredrik Nyman	Patric Mabergs	Simon Olofsson	Johannes Patz		Rickard Hallström	
2026–27	Fredrik Nyman	Patric Mabergs	Simon Granbom	Johannes Patz		Rickard Hallström	

=== Mixed ===
Season	Skip	Third	Second	Lead	Events
2013–14	Greta Aurell	Fredrik Nyman	Sarah Pengel	Max Bäck	SMxCC 2014 (9th)
2016–17	Emma Berg	Zandra Flyg	Axel Sjöberg	Fredrik Nyman	SMxCC 2017 (bronze)
2017–18	Fredrik Nyman (fourth)	Margaretha Sigfridsson (skip)	Joakim Flyg	Zandra Flyg	SMxCC 2018 (5th)
2018–19	Fredrik Nyman	Tova Sundberg	Fredrik Carlsén	Emma Sjödin	SMxCC 2019 (5th)
2022–23	Fanny Sjöberg	Fredrik Nyman	Jennie Wåhlin	Fredrik Carlsén	SMxCC 2023 (gold)

=== Mixed doubles ===
Season	Male	Female	Events
2013–14	Fredrik Nyman	Johanna Höglund	SMDCC 2014 (17th)
2019–20	Fredrik Nyman	Sarah Pengel	SMDCC 2020 (10th)
2022–23	Fredrik Nyman	Sofie Bergman	SMDCC 2023 (10th)
