= Zandra =

Zandra is a given name. Notable people with the first name Zandra include:

- Zandra Ahl (born 1975), Swedish designer, artist, and author
- Zandra Borrero (born 1973), Colombian sprinter
- Zandra Flemister (1951–2023), American diplomat and Secret Service agent
- Zandra Flyg (born 1988), Swedish curler
- Zandra Mok (born 1970), Hong Kong government official
- Zandra Nowell (born 1936), British alpine skier
- Zandra Pettersson (born 1968), Swedish politician and singer
- Zandra Reppe (born 1973), Swedish Paralympic archer and curler
- Zandra Rhodes (born 1940), English fashion and textile designer
- Zandra Summer, Filipina-Austrian actress

== See also ==
- Zandra, Pakistan, a town and union council in Balochistan province
- Zandra Plackett, a character in the British TV series Bad Girls
