= Swedish Mixed Curling Championship =

The Swedish Mixed Curling Championship (Swedish: Svenska mästerskap i curling för mixed, SM lag mixed) is the national championship of mixed curling (two men and two women) in Sweden. It has been held annually since 1968.

== Rules changing ==
Before the 1989–90 season, the team line-up could be "free" (not necessarily "two men and two women" but "four players of any gender"). In the 1989–90 and 1990–91 seasons all four players had to have represented one curling club. Beginning with the 1991–92 season, a minimum two players must be from the same curling club.

== List of champions (1968–2013) ==
(teams line-up in order: fourth, third, second, lead, alternate, coach; skips marked bold)

Year	Champion team (City, curling club)	Team line-up
1968	Djursholms CK (Danderyd)	Christer Wessel, Britta Nerell, Kjell Oscarius, Britta Oscarius
1969	Sundsvalls CK (Sundsvall)	Karl-Erik Bruneflod, Ann-Marie Bruneflod, Lennart Byström, Anna-Stina Ridderheim
1970	Karlstads CK (Karlstad)	Lennart Hemmingson, Maggie Berglöf, Roy Berglöf (IF Göta), Ingegerd Hemmingson
1971	Djursholms CK (Danderyd)	Stig Johnson, Barbro Johnson, Svante Ödman, Suzanne Ödman
1972	Stocksunds CK (Stockholm)	Ulf Lagerbäck, Lena Egnér (Jönköping CC), Birgitta Törn, Göran Perning
1973	Amatörföreningens CK (Stockholm)	Fredrik Lundberg, Elisabeth Klärre (CK Pinglan), Jan Owe-Larsson, Eva Lundberg (CK Pinglan)
1974	Sundsvalls CK (Sundsvall)	Ecke Bruneflod, Ann-Marie Bruneflod, Bo Högström (Karlstads CK), Aina Brunzell
1975	CK ENA (Enköping)	Kjell Oscarius (Djursholms CK), Lilebil Hellström, Claes Roxin, Ulrika Åkerberg
1976	Amatörföreningens CK (Stockholm)	Fredrik Lundberg, Anne Marie Nilsson, Jan Owe-Larsson, Ingegärd Zetterberg
1977	Amatörföreningens CK (Stockholm)	Fredrik Lundberg, Anne Marie Nilsson, Jan Owe-Larsson, Ingegärd Zetterberg
1978	CK Ena (Enköping)	Göran Roxin, Ulrika Åkerberg, Claes Roxin, Marie Henriksson
1979	CK Ena (Enköping)	Göran Roxin, Ulrika Åkerberg, Claes Roxin, Marie Henriksson
1980	CK Ena (Enköping)	Göran Roxin, Ulrika Åkerberg, Claes Roxin, Marie Henriksson
1981	CK Ena (Enköping)	Göran Roxin, Ulrika Åkerberg, Claes Roxin, Helene Frestadius (Magnus Ladulås CK)
1982	Karlstads CK (Karlstad)	Pelle Lindeman, Katarina Hultling, Håkan Ståhlbro, Birgitta Sewik
1983	Falu CC (Falun)	Per Hedén, Katarina Hjorth, Håkan Nilsson, Helena Svensson
1984	Magnus Ladulås CK (Stockholm)	Hans Söderström, Åsa Broström (Örebro CK), Hans Timan, Harriet Eriksson (Härnösands CK)
1985	Karlstads CK (Karlstad)	Axel Kamp, Gertrud Kamp, Göran Roxin (CK Ena), Marie Henriksson
1986	Karlstads CK (Karlstad)	Per Axelsson, Anna Klange (Djursholms CK), Henrik Holmberg, Helena Klange (Djursholms CK)
1987	Falu CC (Falun)	Per Hedén, Anneli Burman, Jan Strandlund (Timrå CK), Annica Ericsson
1988	Jönköping CC (Jönköping)	Mikael Karlsson, Carina Pantzar, Olle Brudsten (Sundbybergs CK), Jessica Sonelius
1989	Falu CC (Falun)	Per Hedén, Anneli Burman, Jan Strandlund, Annica Ericsson
1990	Falu CC (Falun)	Per Hedén, Anneli Burman, Jan Strandlund, Annica Ericsson
1991	Frösö-Oden CK	Rickard Hallström, Susanne Hallström, Flemming Patz, Tina Strömstedt
1992	CK Granit-Gävle (Gävle)	Per Noréen, Camilla Johansson, Mikael Andersson, Anna Wedin
1993	Jönköping CC (Jönköping)	Mikael Karlsson, Trine Qvist, Bo Mattsson, Elisabeth Mattsson
1994	CK Granit-Gävle (Gävle)	Per Noréen, Camilla Johansson, Tomas Andersson, Anna Wedin
1995	Östersunds CK (Östersund)	Peter Lindholm, Cathrine Norberg (Härnösands CK), Peter Narup, Helene Granqvist (Härnösands CK)
1996	Östersunds CK (Östersund)	Helena Klange, Mikael Vilénius (Stocksunds CK), Anna Klange, Kaj Möller (Stocksunds CK)
1997	Malungs CK (Malung)	Joakim Carlsson, Christina Carlsson, Mathias Carlsson, Marja Bergström, alternate: Daniel Prytz (Sundvalls CK)
1998	Örnsköldsviks CK (Örnsköldsvik)	Lars-Åke Nordström, Katarina Öberg (Karlstads CK), Hans Öberg, Cilla Ingelsson
1999	Malungs CK (Malung)	Monika Hedgren-Ohlsson, Mats Ohlsson, Camilla Johansson, Per Noréen (CK Granit)
2000	Härnösands CK (Härnösand)	Andreas Prytz, Christina Bertrup (Umeå CK), Magnus "Muggen" Nilsson (Malungs CK), Andrea Hedström, Linda Olsson (Sundsvall)
2001	Magnus Ladulås CK (Stockholm)	Anna Rindeskog, Christer Rickman, Johanna Hallström, Per Södergren
2002	tournament not played	
2003	CK Granit-Gävle (Gävle)	Andreas Prytz (Härnösand), Christina Bertrup, Magnus Nilsson (Sundbyberg), Linda Ohlsson
2004	Östersunds CK (Östersund)	Elisabeth Norredahl, Rickard Hallström (Sundsvall), Catrin Bitén, Fredrik Hallström
2005	Skellefteå CK (Skellefteå)	Sebastian Kraupp (Sundbyberg), Anna Viktorsson, Niklas Edin (Örnsköldsvik), Stina Viktorsson
2006	Örnsköldsviks CK (Örnsköldsvik)	Per Noréen, Camilla Johansson (CK Granit-Gävle), Flemming Patz, Susanne Patz (Östersunds CK)
2007	Stocksunds CK (Danderyd)	Anders Kraupp, Åsa Häggman, Magnus Nilsson (Sundbybergs CK), Linda Kjerr
2008	Sundbybergs CK (Sundbyberg)	Niklas Edin, Anette Norberg (Härnösands CK), Eric Carlsén (Sundsvalls CK), Anna Hasselborg
2009	Skellefteå CK (Skellefteå)	Lennart Karlsson, Matilda Rhodin, Jonatan Nerdal, Anna Ahlbäck
2010	CK Granit-Gävle (Gävle)	Anna Hasselborg, Kristian Lindström (Lits CC), Agnes Knochenhauer, Marcus Hasselborg (Sundbybergs CK)
2011	Fyris Uppsala (Uppsala)	Per Noréen (Härnösands CK), Camilla Johansson, Isabell Andersson, Patrik Karlsson (CK Granit-Gävle)
2012	Sundsvalls CK (Sundsvall)	Rickard Hallström, Elisabeth Norredahl (Östersunds CK), Fredrik Hallström, Catrin Bitén (Östersunds CK)
2013	IK Fyris/Skellefteå CK Team GAJT	Towe Lundman, Gustav Eskilsson, Anna Gustafsson, Jesper Johansson

== List of champions and medallists (2014–present) ==
(teams line-up in order: fourth, third, second, lead, alternate, coach; skips marked bold)

Year	Champion	Runner-up	Bronze
2014	Skellefteå CK Mabergs (Skellefteå); Patric Mabergs, Isabella Wranå, Johannes Patz, Sofia Mabergs	CK Granit-Gävle Noreen (Gävle); Per Noréen, Camilla Johansson, Mikael Andersson, Isabell Andersson	Sundbybergs CK/IK Fyris Wranå (Sundbyberg); Rasmus Wranå, Amalia Rudström, Joakim Flyg, Johanna Heldin
2015	Sundbyberg CK ParochFlyg (Sundbyberg); Rasmus Wranå, Zandra Flyg, Joakim Flyg, Johanna Heldin, coach: Mats Wranå	Härnösands CK Prytz (Härnösand); Andreas Prytz, Anna Huhta, Mathias Mabergs, Sara McManus	Östersunds CK Hallström/Bitén (Östersund); Rickard Hallström, Elisabeth Norredahl, Fredrik Hallström, Catrin Bitén, coach: Anders Bitén
2016	Sundbyberg CK Hård-Sten (Sundbyberg); Rasmus Wranå, Jennie Wåhlin, Joakim Flyg, Johanna Heldin	Sundsvall Curling Carlsén (Sundsvall); Maria Carlsén, Oskar Sjöström, Maria Wennerström, Fredrik Carlsén	Sundbybergs CK Wrabergs (Sundbyberg); Sofia Mabergs, Patric Mabergs, Isabella Wranå, Johannes Patz, alternate: Fanny Sjöberg
2017	Skellefteå CK Mabergs/Wranå (Skellefteå); Patric Mabergs, Isabella Wranå, Johannes Patz, Sofia Mabergs	Stocksunds CK Norberg (Stockholm); Anette Norberg, Vincent Stenberg, Therese Westman, Robin Ahlberg	CK Granit Gävle Lammkötten & Co (Gävle); Emma Berg, Zandra Flyg, Axel Sjöberg, Fredrik Nyman
2018	Östersunds CK Hallström (Östersund); Rickard Hallström, Elisabeth Norredahl, Fredrik Hallström, Catrin Bitén	Sundbybergs CK Rainbow Warriors (Sundbyberg); Tova Sundberg, Axel Sjöberg, Jennie Wåhlin, Niclas Johansson	Sundbybergs CK Lindström (Sundbyberg); Patric Mabergs, Johanna Heldin, Kristian Lindström, Anna Gustafsson
2019	Härnösands CK Scrubbers (Härnösand); Simon Olofsson, Vilma Åhlström, Axel Sjöberg, Linda Stenlund, coach: Hannes Lindquist	Stocksunds CK Norberg (Danderyd); Anette Norberg, Johannes Patz, Therese Westman, Robin Ahlberg	Härnösand CK Mabergs (Härnösand); Mathias Mabergs, Maria Prytz, Joakim Mabergs, Jessica Ögren, coach: Jens Blixt
2020	not held		
2021	not held		
2022	not held		
2023	SCK, Emoji Squad	KCK, Mabergs	SCK, Nygren; HCK, 8 millimeter
2024	CK Granit, Here comes the boom	IK Fyris, Olofsson	Sundbybergs CK, De tre vännerna och Nyman; Härnösands CK, Mabergs
2025	Volontären finest, Svegs CK; Greta Aurell, Emil Hermansson, Jennie Wåhlin, Fredrik Nyman	Noxis vänner, Sundbybergs CK; Rasmus Wranå, Ezen Kolcevskaja, Albin Kjellberg, Isabella Wranå, Mats Wranå, coach: Monika Wranå	Vätskebalans, Svegs CK; Emma Hansson, Thomas Wallentinsson, Jenny Klockervold Wall, Niklas Edin, coach: Kajsa Bergström; Ny gren för Carlsson, Umeå CK; Erika Nygren, Vilmer Nygren, Sara Carlsson, Johan Nygren
2026	Granbom, Mjölby AI CF; Mikaela Altebro, Johannes Patz, Rebecka Thunman, Simon Granbom	Noreen, Härnösands CK; Per Noréen, Tova Noreen, Ida Åkerberg, Mattias Åkerberg	Svegs björnen, Svegs CK; Emma Hansson, Emil Hermansson, Anki Nordqvist, Emil Markusson, Jennie Wåhlin

== See also ==
- Swedish Men's Curling Championship
- Swedish Women's Curling Championship
- Swedish Mixed Doubles Curling Championship
- Swedish Junior Curling Championships
- Swedish Senior Curling Championships
- Swedish Wheelchair Curling Championship
