= Catrin Bitén =

Swedish female curler

- Curler ♀

Team
- Curling club: Östersunds CK, Östersund

Curling career
- Member Association: Sweden
- Other appearances: World Mixed Championship: 1 (2018), European Mixed Championship: 1 (2012)
Medal record
Curling
European Mixed Championship
Silver medal – second place	2012 Erzurum

Catrin Bitén is a Swedish female curler.

She is a three-time Swedish mixed champion (2004, 2012, 2018) and a 2010 Swedish mixed doubles champion.

== Teams ==
=== Women's ===
Season	Skip	Third	Second	Lead	Alternate	Events
2017–18	Catrin Bitén	Anne-Li Sjölund	Susanne Patz	Katarina Nyberg	Elisabeth Persson	SSCC 2018 (bronze)
2018–19	Anne-Li Sjölund (fourth)	Catrin Bitén (skip)	Susanne Patz	Katarina Nyberg		SSCC 2019 (5th)

=== Mixed ===
Season	Skip	Third	Second	Lead	Coach	Events
2003–04	Elisabeth Norredahl	Rickard Hallström	Catrin Bitén	Fredrik Hallström		SMxCC 2004 (gold)
2011–12	Rickard Hallström	Elisabeth Norredahl	Fredrik Hallström	Catrin Bitén		SMxCC 2012 (gold)
2012–13	Rickard Hallström	Elisabeth Norredahl	Fredrik Hallström	Catrin Bitén	Marcus Olovsson	EMxCC 2012 (silver)
2012–13	Rickard Hallström	Catrin Bitén	Per Carlsén	Camilla Johansson		SMxCC 2013 (5th)
2013–14	Rickard Hallström	Elisabeth Norredahl	Per Carlsén	Catrin Bitén		SMxCC 2014 (5th)
2014–15	Rickard Hallström	Elisabeth Norredahl	Fredrik Hallström	Catrin Bitén	Anders Bitén	SMxCC 2015 (bronze)
2015–16	Rickard Hallström	Elisabeth Norredahl	Fredrik Hallström	Catrin Bitén	Anders Bitén	SMxCC 2016 (5th)
2016–17	Rickard Hallström	Elisabeth Norredahl	Fredrik Hallström	Catrin Bitén		SMxCC 2017 (9th)
2017–18	Rickard Hallström	Elisabeth Norredahl	Fredrik Hallström	Catrin Bitén		SMxCC 2018 (gold)
2018–19	Rickard Hallström	Elisabeth Norredahl	Fredrik Hallström	Catrin Bitén	Marcus Olovsson (WMxCC)	WMxCC 2018 (9th); SMxCC 2019 (13th)

=== Mixed doubles ===
Season	Male	Female	Events
2007–08	Rickard Hallström	Catrin Bitén	SMDCC 2008 (bronze)
2009–10	Rickard Hallström	Catrin Bitén	SMDCC 2010 (gold)
2011–12	Rickard Hallström	Catrin Bitén	SMDCC 2012 (5th)
