= Elisabeth Norredahl =

Swedish female curler

- Curler ♀
- Born: Anna Margareta Elisabet Hansson; 2 October 1967 (age 59); Östersund

Team
- Curling club: Frösö-Oden CK, Östersund, Östersunds CK, Östersund

Curling career
- Member Association: Sweden
- World Championship: 1 (1990)
- World Mixed Doubles Championship: 1 (2013)
- European Championship: 3 (1990, 1994, 1995)
- Other appearances: World Mixed Championship: 1 (2018), European Mixed Championship: 1 (2012), World Junior Championships: 1 (1988)
Medal record
Curling
European Championships
Bronze medal – third place	1995 Grindelwald
Swedish Women's Championship
Gold medal – first place	1990
World Mixed Doubles Championship
Silver medal – second place	2013 Fredericton
European Mixed Championship
Silver medal – second place	2012 Erzurum

Anna Margareta Elisabet "Bettan" Norredahl (née Hansson; born 2 October 1967 in Östersund) is a Swedish female curler.

In 2013 she was inducted into the Swedish Curling Hall of Fame.

== Teams ==
=== Women's ===
Season	Skip	Third	Second	Lead	Alternate	Coach	Events
1987–88	Elisabeth Hansson (fourth)	Annika Lööf (skip)	Catharina Eklund	Malin Lundberg			SJCC 1988 (gold); WJCC 1988 (6th)
1989–90	Helena Svensson (fourth)	Lotta Giesenfeld (skip)	Elisabeth Hansson	Annika Lööf	Lena Mårdberg		SWCC 1990 (gold); WCC 1990 (6th)
1990–91	Annika Lööf	Lotta Giesenfeld	Helena Svensson	Elisabeth Hansson	Lena Mårdberg		ECC 1990 (6th)
1994–95	Anette Norberg	Cathrine Norberg	Helena Klange	Helene Granqvist	Elisabeth Hansson	Åke Norberg	ECC 1994 (5th)
1995–96	Elisabet Gustafson	Katarina Nyberg	Louise Marmont	Elisabeth Persson	Elisabeth Hansson	Jan Strandlund	ECC 1995 (bronze)
2014–15	Elisabeth Norredahl	Tova Sundberg	Emma Sjodin	Sandra Ljundberg			

=== Mixed ===
Season	Skip	Third	Second	Lead	Coach	Events
2003–04	Elisabeth Norredahl	Rickard Hallström	Catrin Biten	Fredrik Hallström		SMxCC 2004 (gold)
2011–12	Rickard Hallström	Elisabeth Norredahl	Fredrik Hallström	Catrin Biten		SMxCC 2012 (gold)
2012–13	Rickard Hallström	Elisabeth Norredahl	Fredrik Hallström	Catrin Biten	Marcus Olovsson	EMxCC 2012 (silver)
2014–15	Rickard Hallström	Elisabeth Norredahl	Fredrik Hallström	Catrin Biten	Anders Bitén	SMxCC 2015 (bronze)
2016–17	Rickard Hallström	Elisabeth Norredahl	Fredrik Hallström	Catrin Biten		SMxCC 2017 (9th)
2017–18	Rickard Hallström	Elisabeth Norredahl	Fredrik Hallström	Catrin Biten		SMxCC 2018 (gold)
2018–19	Rickard Hallström	Elisabeth Norredahl	Fredrik Hallström	Catrin Biten	Marcus Olovsson (WMxCC)	WMxCC 2018 (9th); SMxCC 2019 (13th)

=== Mixed doubles ===
Season	Male	Female	Coach	Events
2012–13	Fredrik Hallström	Elisabeth Norredahl	Per Noréen	SMDCC 2013 (silver); WMDCC 2013 (silver)
2013–14	Fredrik Hallström	Elisabeth Norredahl		SMDCC 2014 (5th)
2014–15	Fredrik Hallström	Elisabeth Norredahl		SMDCC 2015 (silver)
2015–16	Fredrik Hallström	Elisabeth Norredahl		SMDCC 2016 (13th)
