= Swedish Mixed Doubles Curling Championship =

National curling championship

The Swedish Mixed Doubles Curling Championship (Swedish: Svenska mästerskap i curling för mixed dubbel, SM Mixed Dubbel) is the national championship of mixed doubles curling (one man and one woman) in Sweden. It has been held annually since season 2007-2008 (??).

== List of champions and medallists ==
Team line-ups shows in order: man, woman, coach (if exists).

Year	Champion	Runner-up	Bronze
2008	M: Göran Carlsson; W: Marie Persson	M: Sebastian Kraupp; W: Sara Carlsson	M: Rickard Hallström; W: Catrin Bitén
2009	M: Andreas Prytz; W: Sofia Gustafsson	M: Göran Carlsson; W: Marie Persson	M: Niklas Edin; W: Lotta Lennartsson
2010	M: Rickard Hallström; W: Catrin Bitén	M: Andreas Prytz; W: Agnes Knochenhauer	M: Kristian Lindström; W: Sara Carlsson
2011	M: Anders Kraupp; W: Sabina Kraupp	M: Marcus Hasselborg; W: Anna Hasselborg	M: Kristian Lindström; W: Sara Carlsson
2012	M: Per Noréen; W: Camilla Johansson	M: Mats Wranå; W: Monika Wranå	M: Mats Nyberg; W: Ingrid Meldahl
2013	M: Oskar Eriksson; W: Anna Hasselborg	M: Fredrik Hallström; W: Elisabeth Norredahl	M: Rasmus Wranå; W: Johanna Heldin
2014	M: Per Noréen; W: Camilla Johansson	M: Karl Nordlund; W: Ingrid Meldahl	M: Andreas Prytz; W: Sofia Mabergs
2015	M: Per Noréen; W: Camilla Johansson	M: Fredrik Hallström; W: Elisabeth Norredahl	M: Emil Markusson; W: Tova Sundberg
2016	M: Oskar Eriksson; W: Anna Hasselborg	M: Per Carlsén; W: Margaretha Sigfridsson	M: Rasmus Wranå; W: Isabella Wranå
2017	M: Oskar Eriksson; W: Anna Hasselborg	M: Niklas Edin; W: Sara McManus	M: Vincent Stenberg; W: Anette Norberg
2018	M: Robin Ahlberg; W: Therese Westman	M: Per Noréen; W: Camilla Noréen	M: Fabian Wingfors; W: Malin Wendel
2019	M: Oskar Eriksson; W: Anna Hasselborg; Coach: Mathias Eriksson	M: Robin Ahlberg; W: Therese Westman; Coach: Anette Norberg	M: Kristian Lindström; W: Johanna Heldin
2020	M: Rasmus Wranå; W: Agnes Knochenhauer	M: Kristian Lindström; W: Johanna Heldin	M: Mats Wranå; W: Monika Wranå
2021	M: Oskar Eriksson; W: Almida de Val	M: Robin Ahlberg; W: Therese Westman	M: Rasmus Wranå; W: Isabella Wranå
2022	M: Daniel Magnusson; W: Johanna Heldin	M: Robin Ahlberg; W: Therese Westman	M: Axel Sjöberg; W: Fanny Sjöberg
2023	M: Daniel Magnusson; W: Rebecka Thunman	M: Robin Ahlberg; W: Therese Westman	M: Fabian Wingfors; W: Malin Wendel
2024	M: Simon Granbom; W: Isabell Andersson	M: Alexander Palm; W: Emelie Sarén	M: Jacob Hanna; W: Sofie Bergman
2025	M: Johan Nygren; W: Jennie Wåhlin	M: Olle Moberg; W: Emma Moberg	M: Johannes Patz; W: Nilla Hallström
2026	M: Robin Ahlberg; W: Therese Westman	M: Johannes Patz; W: Nilla Hallström	M: Simon Granbom; W: Rebecka Thunman

== Medal record for curlers ==
As of 2026 Swedish Mixed Doubles Curling Championship

Curler	Gold	Silver	Bronze
Oskar Eriksson	5		
Anna Hasselborg	4	1	
Per Noréen	3	1	
Camilla Noréen (Camilla Johansson)	3	1	
Robin Ahlberg	2	4	
Therese Westman	2	4	
Daniel Magnusson	2		
Johanna Heldin	1	1	2
Andreas Prytz	1	1	1
Göran Carlsson	1	1	
Marie Persson	1	1	
Agnes Knochenhauer	1	1	
Rasmus Wranå	1		3
Catrin Bitén	1		1
Rickard Hallström	1		1
Simon Granbom	1		1
Rebecka Thunman	1		1
Isabell Andersson	1		
Sofia Gustafsson	1		
Anders Kraupp	1		
Sabina Kraupp	1		
Johan Nygren	1		
Almida de Val	1		
Jennie Wåhlin	1		
Fredrik Hallström		2	
Elisabeth Norredahl		2	
Kristian Lindström		1	3
Sara Carlsson		1	2
Niklas Edin		1	1
Ingrid Meldahl		1	1
Mats Wranå		1	1
Monika Wranå		1	1
Nilla Hallström		1	1
Johannes Patz		1	1
Per Carlsén		1	
Marcus Hasselborg		1	
Sebastian Kraupp		1	
Sara McManus		1	
Emma Moberg		1	
Olle Moberg		1	
Karl Nordlund		1	
Alexander Palm		1	
Emelie Sarén		1	
Margaretha Sigfridsson		1	
Malin Wendel			2
Fabian Wingfors			2
Isabella Wranå			2
Sofie Bergman			1
Jacob Hanna			1
Lotta Lennartsson			1
Sofia Mabergs			1
Emil Markusson			1
Anette Norberg			1
Mats Nyberg			1
Axel Sjöberg			1
Fanny Sjöberg			1
Vincent Stenberg			1
Tova Sundberg			1

== See also ==
- Swedish Men's Curling Championship
- Swedish Women's Curling Championship
- Swedish Mixed Curling Championship
- Swedish Junior Curling Championships
- Swedish Junior Mixed Doubles Curling Championship
- Swedish Senior Curling Championships
- Swedish Wheelchair Curling Championship
