= Joakim Flyg =

Swedish male curler (born 1990)

- Curler
- Born: 16 October 1990 (age 36)

Team
- Curling club: Sundbybergs CK, Sundbyberg

Curling career
- Member Association: Sweden
- Other appearances: World Mixed Championship: 2 (2015, 2016)
Medal record
Curling
World Mixed Championship
Silver medal – second place	2015 Bern
Silver medal – second place	2016 Kazan
Swedish Men's Championship
Gold medal – first place	2017
Silver medal – second place	2018
Swedish Mixed Championship
Gold medal – first place	2015
Gold medal – first place	2016
Bronze medal – third place	2014
Bronze medal – third place	2018

Joakim Karl-Olof Flyg (born 16 October 1990) is a Swedish curler.

He is a 2017 Swedish men's champion and a two-time Swedish mixed champion (2015, 2016).

== Teams ==
=== Men's ===
Season	Skip	Third	Second	Lead	Alternate	Coach	Events
2013–14	Fredrik Julius	Martin Vallee	Johan Bergman	Joakim Flyg	Gerry Wåhlin		
2015–16	Rasmus Wranå	Fredrik Nyman	Jordan Wåhlin	Joakim Flyg	Max Bäck		SMCC 2016 (bronze); SJCC 2016 (gold)
2016–17	Kristian Lindström	Henrik Leek	Victor Martinsson	Joakim Flyg			SMCC 2017 (gold)
2017–18	Kristian Lindström	Henrik Leek	Joakim Flyg	Victor Martinsson		Kenneth Lindström	SMCC 2018 (silver)

=== Mixed ===
Season	Skip	Third	Second	Lead	Coach	Events
2013–14	Rasmus Wranå	Amalia Rudström	Joakim Flyg	Johanna Heldin		SMxCC 2014 (bronze)
2014–15	Rasmus Wranå	Zandra Flyg	Joakim Flyg	Johanna Heldin		SMxCC 2015 (gold)
2015–16	Rasmus Wranå	Zandra Flyg	Joakim Flyg	Johanna Heldin	Mats Wranå	WMxCC 2015 (silver)
2015–16	Rasmus Wranå	Jennie Wåhlin	Joakim Flyg	Johanna Heldin		SMxCC 2016 (gold)
2016–17	Kristian Lindström	Jennie Wåhlin	Joakim Flyg	Johanna Heldin	Zandra Flyg	WMxCC 2015 (silver)
2017–18	Fredrik Nyman (fourth)	Margaretha Sigfridsson (skip)	Joakim Flyg	Zandra Flyg		SMxCC 2018 (5th)

== Personal life ==
His sister is Swedish curler and coach Zandra Flyg. They played together at the 2015 World Mixed Curling Championship.
