= Curling at the 2026 Winter Olympics – Mixed doubles tournament =

Mixed doubles curling at the XXV Olympic Winter Games
- Venue: Cortina Olympic Stadium
- Dates: 4–10 February
- Competitors: 20 from 10 nations

Medalists
1st place, gold medalist(s)		Isabella Wranå; Rasmus Wranå	Sweden
2nd place, silver medalist(s)		Cory Thiesse; Korey Dropkin	United States
3rd place, bronze medalist(s)		Stefania Constantini; Amos Mosaner	Italy

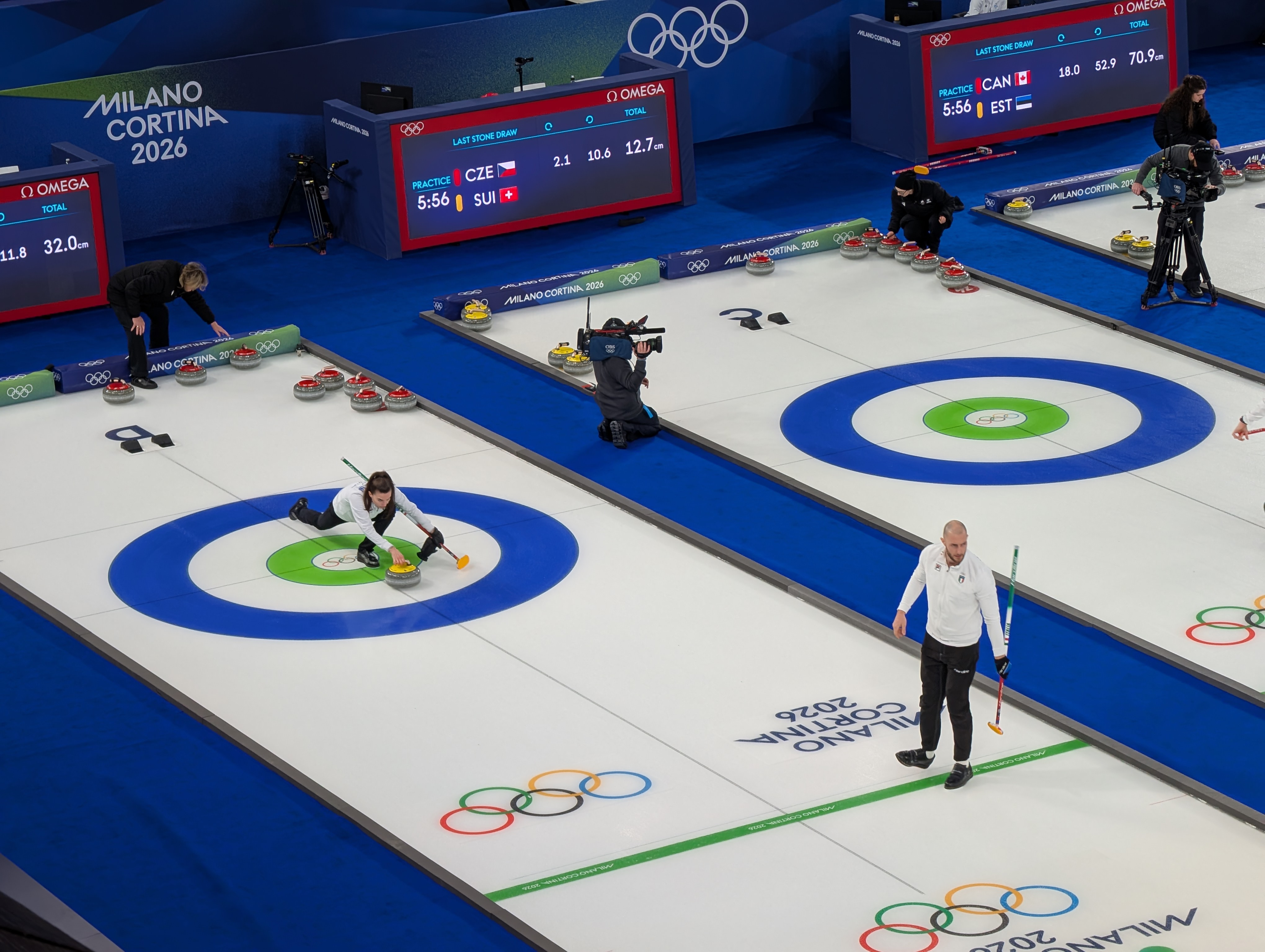
Bronze medalists for Italy Stefania Constantini and Amos Mosaner during the tournament

The mixed doubles curling tournament of the 2026 Winter Olympics was held at the Cortina Olympic Stadium in Cortina d’Ampezzo from 4 to 10 February 2026.

Ten nations competed in a round robin preliminary round, and the top four nations at the conclusion of the round robin qualified for the medal round.

Sweden won the gold medal with the United States taking silver and Italy the bronze.

== Competition schedule ==
RR	Round robin	SF	Semifinals	B	3rd place play-off	F	Final

Date Event	Wed 4	Thu 5	Fri 6	Sat 7	Sun 8	Mon 9		Tue 10	
Mixed doubles	RR	RR	RR	RR	RR	RR	SF	B	F

== Qualification ==
The top seven nations based on combined rankings at the 2024 World Mixed Doubles Curling Championship and 2025 World Mixed Doubles Curling Championship qualified along with hosts Italy. The final two teams qualified through the 2025 Olympic Qualification Event.

Means of qualification	Dates	Location	Quotas	Qualified
Host nation	—N/a		1	Italy
Qualification points at the 2024 & 2025 World Championships	20–27 April 2024	Östersund, Sweden	7	Estonia; Sweden; Great Britain; Norway; Canada; Switzerland; United States
Qualification points at the 2024 & 2025 World Championships	26 April–3 May 2025	Fredericton, Canada	7	Estonia; Sweden; Great Britain; Norway; Canada; Switzerland; United States
Olympic Qualification Event	15–19 December 2025	Kelowna, Canada	2	Czech Republic; South Korea
Total			10	

== Teams ==
The teams are listed as follows:

Canada	Czech Republic	Estonia	Great Britain	Italy
Female: Jocelyn Peterman; Male: Brett Gallant	Female: Julie Zelingrová; Male: Vít Chabičovský	Female: Marie Kaldvee; Male: Harri Lill	Female: Jennifer Dodds; Male: Bruce Mouat	Female: Stefania Constantini; Male: Amos Mosaner
Norway	South Korea	Sweden	Switzerland	United States
Female: Kristin Skaslien; Male: Magnus Nedregotten	Female: Kim Seon-yeong; Male: Jeong Yeong-seok	Female: Isabella Wranå; Male: Rasmus Wranå	Female: Briar Schwaller-Hürlimann; Male: Yannick Schwaller	Female: Cory Thiesse; Male: Korey Dropkin

== Round-robin standings ==
Final Round Robin Standings
Team	Athletes	Pld	W	L	W–L	PF	PA	EW	EL	BE	SE	S%	DSC	Qualification
Great Britain	Jennifer Dodds / Bruce Mouat	9	8	1	–	69	46	37	30	0	11	79.6%	20.931	Playoffs
Italy	Stefania Constantini / Amos Mosaner	9	6	3	1–0	60	50	32	31	1	11	78.3%	27.931	Playoffs
United States	Cory Thiesse / Korey Dropkin	9	6	3	0–1	58	45	36	33	0	12	83.1%	25.900	Playoffs
Sweden	Isabella Wranå / Rasmus Wranå	9	5	4	–	62	55	31	34	0	9	80.1%	19.413	Playoffs
Canada	Jocelyn Peterman / Brett Gallant	9	4	5	2–0	58	52	35	31	0	10	78.5%	36.050	
Norway	Kristin Skaslien / Magnus Nedregotten	9	4	5	1–1	52	47	37	33	0	12	77.1%	24.444	
Switzerland	Briar Schwaller-Hürlimann / Yannick Schwaller	9	4	5	0–2	56	67	32	35	0	6	74.5%	24.000	
Czech Republic	Julie Zelingrová / Vít Chabičovský	9	3	6	1–0	45	62	30	34	0	6	69.1%	16.019	
South Korea	Kim Seon-yeong / Jeong Yeong-seok	9	3	6	0–1	47	64	32	34	0	9	75.1%	42.425	
Estonia	Marie Kaldvee / Harri Lill	9	2	7	–	46	65	32	39	0	7	71.6%	19.300	

Source: Official website

Mixed doubles round robin summary table
Pos	Team	W	L	GBR	ITA	USA	SWE	CAN	NOR	SUI	CZE	KOR	EST
1	Great Britain	8	1	—	9–6	6–4	7–4	7–5	8–6	6–7	8–7	8–2	10–5
2	Italy	6	3	6–9	—	7–6	4–9	2–7	6–5	12–4	8–2	8–4	7–4
3	United States	6	3	4–6	6–7	—	8–7	7–5	8–6	7–4	8–1	5–6	5–3
4	Sweden	5	4	4–7	9–4	7–8	—	7–6	0–9	13–7	7–4	10–3	5–7
5	Canada	4	5	5–7	7–2	5–7	6–7	—	6–3	8–4	10–5	5–9	6–8
6	Norway	4	5	6–8	5–6	6–8	9–0	3–6	—	6–3	3–6	8–5	6–5
7	Switzerland	4	5	7–6	4–12	4–7	7–13	4–8	3–6	—	10–3	8–5	9–7
8	Czech Republic	3	6	7–8	2–8	1–8	4–7	5–10	6–3	3–10	—	9–4	8–4
9	South Korea	3	6	2–8	4–8	6–5	3–10	9–5	5–8	5–8	4–9	—	9–3
10	Estonia	2	7	5–10	4–7	3–5	7–5	8–6	5–6	7–9	4–8	3–9	—

Source: Official website
Legend: Blue = home team win; Red = away team win.

== Round-robin results ==
All draw times are listed in Central European Time (UTC+01:00).

=== Draw 1 ===
Wednesday, 4 February, 19:05

Sheet A	1	2	3	4	5	6	7	8	Final
Sweden (Wranå / Wranå)	0	2	0	3	4	1	X	X	10
South Korea (Kim / Jeong) 🔨	1	0	2	0	0	0	X	X	3

Sheet B	1	2	3	4	5	6	7	8	Final
Great Britain (Dodds / Mouat) 🔨	0	3	0	1	0	3	0	1	8
Norway (Skaslien / Nedregotten)	1	0	2	0	1	0	2	0	6

Sheet C	1	2	3	4	5	6	7	8	Final
Canada (Peterman / Gallant)	1	4	0	2	0	3	0	X	10
Czech Republic (Zelingrová / Chabičovský) 🔨	0	0	3	0	1	0	1	X	5

Sheet D	1	2	3	4	5	6	7	8	9	Final
Estonia (Kaldvee / Lill)	0	1	0	0	0	2	0	4	0	7
Switzerland (Schwaller-Hürlimann / Schwaller) 🔨	1	0	2	1	1	0	2	0	2	9

=== Draw 2 ===
Thursday, 5 February, 10:05

Sheet A	1	2	3	4	5	6	7	8	Final
Great Britain (Dodds / Mouat) 🔨	2	0	2	0	2	0	4	X	10
Estonia (Kaldvee / Lill)	0	2	0	1	0	2	0	X	5

Sheet B	1	2	3	4	5	6	7	8	Final
Czech Republic (Zelingrová / Chabičovský) 🔨	0	1	0	0	1	0	2	X	4
Sweden (Wranå / Wranå)	1	0	1	2	0	3	0	X	7

Sheet C	1	2	3	4	5	6	7	8	Final
Norway (Skaslien / Nedregotten)	0	3	0	2	0	1	0	0	6
United States (Thiesse / Dropkin) 🔨	1	0	2	0	1	0	2	2	8

Sheet D	1	2	3	4	5	6	7	8	Final
South Korea (Kim / Jeong) 🔨	1	0	0	0	1	0	2	X	4
Italy (Constantini / Mosaner)	0	1	2	3	0	2	0	X	8

=== Draw 3 ===
Thursday, 5 February, 14:35

Sheet A	1	2	3	4	5	6	7	8	Final
United States (Thiesse / Dropkin)	1	0	2	2	0	2	0	X	7
Switzerland (Schwaller-Hürlimann / Schwaller) 🔨	0	2	0	0	1	0	1	X	4

Sheet B	1	2	3	4	5	6	7	8	Final
Norway (Skaslien / Nedregotten) 🔨	0	1	0	0	1	0	1	0	3
Canada (Peterman / Gallant)	1	0	2	1	0	1	0	1	6

=== Draw 4 ===
Thursday, 5 February, 19:05

Sheet A	1	2	3	4	5	6	7	8	Final
Canada (Peterman / Gallant) 🔨	5	0	1	0	1	0	X	X	7
Italy (Constantini / Mosaner)	0	1	0	1	0	0	X	X	2

Sheet B	1	2	3	4	5	6	7	8	Final
Switzerland (Schwaller-Hürlimann / Schwaller) 🔨	1	0	4	0	1	0	2	X	8
South Korea (Kim / Jeong)	0	2	0	1	0	2	0	X	5

Sheet C	1	2	3	4	5	6	7	8	Final
Estonia (Kaldvee / Lill)	0	3	0	1	1	1	0	1	7
Sweden (Wranå / Wranå) 🔨	1	0	2	0	0	0	2	0	5

Sheet D	1	2	3	4	5	6	7	8	Final
Czech Republic (Zelingrová / Chabičovský)	1	0	1	0	3	0	0	2	7
Great Britain (Dodds / Mouat) 🔨	0	3	0	2	0	2	1	0	8

=== Draw 5 ===
Friday, 6 February, 10:05

Sheet B	1	2	3	4	5	6	7	8	Final
Sweden (Wranå / Wranå)	0	0	2	1	0	1	0	X	4
Great Britain (Dodds / Mouat) 🔨	1	3	0	0	2	0	1	X	7

Sheet C	1	2	3	4	5	6	7	8	Final
Italy (Constantini / Mosaner) 🔨	3	0	0	4	3	2	X	X	12
Switzerland (Schwaller-Hürlimann / Schwaller)	0	3	1	0	0	0	X	X	4

Sheet D	1	2	3	4	5	6	7	8	Final
United States (Thiesse / Dropkin) 🔨	0	2	1	0	1	0	3	0	7
Canada (Peterman / Gallant)	1	0	0	2	0	1	0	1	5

=== Draw 6 ===
Friday, 6 February, 14:35

Sheet A	1	2	3	4	5	6	7	8	Final
Czech Republic (Zelingrová / Chabičovský) 🔨	0	0	0	1	0	0	X	X	1
United States (Thiesse / Dropkin)	1	3	1	0	1	2	X	X	8

Sheet B	1	2	3	4	5	6	7	8	Final
Italy (Constantini / Mosaner)	3	1	0	0	2	0	0	1	7
Estonia (Kaldvee / Lill) 🔨	0	0	1	1	0	1	1	0	4

Sheet C	1	2	3	4	5	6	7	8	Final
South Korea (Kim / Jeong) 🔨	0	0	1	0	0	0	1	X	2
Great Britain (Dodds / Mouat)	2	1	0	2	2	1	0	X	8

Sheet D	1	2	3	4	5	6	7	8	Final
Sweden (Wranå / Wranå) 🔨	0	0	0	0	0	0	X	X	0
Norway (Skaslien / Nedregotten)	1	1	3	1	2	1	X	X	9

=== Draw 7 ===
Saturday, 7 February, 10:05

Sheet C	1	2	3	4	5	6	7	8	Final
Great Britain (Dodds / Mouat) 🔨	3	0	2	0	2	0	0	X	7
Canada (Peterman / Gallant)	0	1	0	1	0	1	2	X	5

Sheet D	1	2	3	4	5	6	7	8	Final
Switzerland (Schwaller-Hürlimann / Schwaller)	0	1	0	4	0	2	0	0	7
Sweden (Wranå / Wranå) 🔨	1	0	2	0	4	0	3	3	13

=== Draw 8 ===
Saturday, 7 February, 14:35

Sheet A	1	2	3	4	5	6	7	8	Final
Estonia (Kaldvee / Lill)	0	0	1	0	2	0	2	0	5
Norway (Skaslien / Nedregotten) 🔨	1	1	0	1	0	2	0	1	6

Sheet B	1	2	3	4	5	6	7	8	Final
South Korea (Kim / Jeong)	0	1	1	0	0	2	0	X	4
Czech Republic (Zelingrová / Chabičovský) 🔨	2	0	0	2	2	0	3	X	9

Sheet C	1	2	3	4	5	6	7	8	Final
Sweden (Wranå / Wranå)	0	2	1	0	3	0	3	X	9
Italy (Constantini / Mosaner) 🔨	1	0	0	1	0	2	0	X	4

Sheet D	1	2	3	4	5	6	7	8	Final
Great Britain (Dodds / Mouat) 🔨	2	1	0	1	0	1	1	X	6
United States (Thiesse / Dropkin)	0	0	1	0	3	0	0	X	4

=== Draw 9 ===
Saturday, 7 February, 19:05

Sheet A	1	2	3	4	5	6	7	8	9	Final
South Korea (Kim / Jeong) 🔨	1	1	0	1	0	1	1	0	1	6
United States (Thiesse / Dropkin)	0	0	1	0	1	0	0	3	0	5

Sheet B	1	2	3	4	5	6	7	8	Final
Canada (Peterman / Gallant)	0	0	0	2	0	3	0	1	6
Estonia (Kaldvee / Lill) 🔨	3	2	1	0	1	0	1	0	8

Sheet C	1	2	3	4	5	6	7	8	Final
Czech Republic (Zelingrová / Chabičovský) 🔨	0	1	0	1	0	1	0	X	3
Switzerland (Schwaller-Hürlimann / Schwaller)	2	0	1	0	4	0	3	X	10

Sheet D	1	2	3	4	5	6	7	8	Final
Norway (Skaslien / Nedregotten) 🔨	2	0	1	0	1	1	0	0	5
Italy (Constantini / Mosaner)	0	1	0	2	0	0	2	1	6

=== Draw 10 ===
Sunday, 8 February, 10:05

Sheet A	1	2	3	4	5	6	7	8	Final
Norway (Skaslien / Nedregotten)	0	1	0	0	1	0	1	0	3
Czech Republic (Zelingrová / Chabičovský) 🔨	1	0	2	1	0	1	0	1	6

Sheet B	1	2	3	4	5	6	7	8	Final
Estonia (Kaldvee / Lill)	0	0	1	0	1	0	1	X	3
South Korea (Kim / Jeong) 🔨	3	2	0	2	0	2	0	X	9

=== Draw 11 ===
Sunday, 8 February, 14:35

Sheet A	1	2	3	4	5	6	7	8	Final
Canada (Peterman / Gallant) 🔨	0	2	0	1	0	2	0	1	6
Sweden (Wranå / Wranå)	2	0	1	0	1	0	3	0	7

Sheet B	1	2	3	4	5	6	7	8	Final
Great Britain (Dodds / Mouat)	0	0	0	2	2	0	2	0	6
Switzerland (Schwaller-Hürlimann / Schwaller) 🔨	1	2	1	0	0	1	0	2	7

Sheet C	1	2	3	4	5	6	7	8	Final
United States (Thiesse / Dropkin)	0	1	0	1	0	1	1	1	5
Estonia (Kaldvee / Lill) 🔨	1	0	1	0	1	0	0	0	3

Sheet D	1	2	3	4	5	6	7	8	Final
Italy (Constantini / Mosaner)	0	3	2	2	1	0	X	X	8
Czech Republic (Zelingrová / Chabičovský) 🔨	1	0	0	0	0	1	X	X	2

=== Draw 12 ===
Sunday, 8 February, 19:05

Sheet A	1	2	3	4	5	6	7	8	Final
Italy (Constantini / Mosaner) 🔨	2	0	1	0	0	3	0	0	6
Great Britain (Dodds / Mouat)	0	3	0	1	1	0	3	1	9

Sheet B	1	2	3	4	5	6	7	8	Final
Sweden (Wranå / Wranå) 🔨	3	0	1	0	0	2	1	0	7
United States (Thiesse / Dropkin)	0	3	0	3	1	0	0	1	8

Sheet C	1	2	3	4	5	6	7	8	Final
Switzerland (Schwaller-Hürlimann / Schwaller)	0	1	0	1	0	1	0	0	3
Norway (Skaslien / Nedregotten) 🔨	1	0	1	0	1	0	2	1	6

Sheet D	1	2	3	4	5	6	7	8	Final
Canada (Peterman / Gallant)	0	1	2	0	0	2	0	0	5
South Korea (Kim / Jeong) 🔨	1	0	0	3	2	0	2	1	9

=== Draw 13 ===
Monday, 9 February, 10:05

Sheet A	1	2	3	4	5	6	7	8	Final
Switzerland (Schwaller-Hürlimann / Schwaller) 🔨	0	0	2	0	0	2	0	X	4
Canada (Peterman / Gallant)	1	2	0	1	1	0	3	X	8

Sheet B	1	2	3	4	5	6	7	8	Final
United States (Thiesse / Dropkin) 🔨	1	0	0	1	0	2	2	0	6
Italy (Constantini / Mosaner)	0	1	1	0	4	0	0	1	7

Sheet C	1	2	3	4	5	6	7	8	Final
Norway (Skaslien / Nedregotten) 🔨	0	0	2	0	0	3	2	1	8
South Korea (Kim / Jeong)	1	2	0	1	1	0	0	0	5

Sheet D	1	2	3	4	5	6	7	8	Final
Czech Republic (Zelingrová / Chabičovský)	0	1	4	0	0	1	1	1	8
Estonia (Kaldvee / Lill) 🔨	2	0	0	1	1	0	0	0	4

== Playoffs ==
Semifinals
1	Great Britain	3
4	Sweden	9
2	Italy	8
3	United States	9

Gold medal game
4	Sweden	6
3	United States	5
Bronze medal game
1	Great Britain	3
2	Italy	5

=== Semifinals ===
Monday, 9 February, 18:05

Sheet B	1	2	3	4	5	6	7	8	Final
Great Britain (Dodds / Mouat) 🔨	1	0	0	1	1	0	0	X	3
Sweden (Wranå / Wranå)	0	2	1	0	0	5	1	X	9

Player percentages
Great Britain		Sweden	
Jennifer Dodds	57%	Isabella Wranå	91%
Bruce Mouat	69%	Rasmus Wranå	92%
Total	64%	Total	91%

Sheet D	1	2	3	4	5	6	7	8	Final
Italy (Constantini / Mosaner) 🔨	2	0	2	0	1	0	3	0	8
United States (Thiesse / Dropkin)	0	2	0	3	0	2	0	2	9

Player percentages
Italy		United States	
Stefania Constantini	75%	Cory Thiesse	92%
Amos Mosaner	74%	Korey Dropkin	85%
Total	74%	Total	88%

=== Bronze medal game ===
Tuesday, 10 February, 14:05

Sheet C	1	2	3	4	5	6	7	8	Final
Great Britain (Dodds / Mouat) 🔨	0	1	0	0	1	0	1	0	3
Italy (Constantini / Mosaner)	1	0	1	1	0	1	0	1	5

Player percentages
Great Britain		Italy	
Jennifer Dodds	77%	Stefania Constantini	92%
Bruce Mouat	88%	Amos Mosaner	89%
Total	84%	Total	90%

=== Gold medal game ===
Tuesday, 10 February, 18:05

Sheet C	1	2	3	4	5	6	7	8	Final
Sweden (Wranå / Wranå)	0	2	0	1	0	1	0	2	6
United States (Thiesse / Dropkin) 🔨	1	0	1	0	1	0	2	0	5

Player percentages
Sweden		United States	
Isabella Wranå	97%	Cory Thiesse	73%
Rasmus Wranå	74%	Korey Dropkin	72%
Total	83%	Total	73%

== Final standings ==
The final standings are:

Place	Team
1st place, gold medalist(s)	Sweden
2nd place, silver medalist(s)	United States
3rd place, bronze medalist(s)	Italy
4	Great Britain
5	Canada
6	Norway
7	Switzerland
8	Czech Republic
9	South Korea
10	Estonia

== Statistics ==
=== Player percentages ===
Percentages by draw.

==== Female ====
#	Curler	1	2	3	4	5	6	7	8	9	Total
1	Jennifer Dodds (GBR)	80	86	78	83	77	78	91	84	77	81.4
2	Cory Thiesse (USA)	78	92	80	98	64	63	73	90	89	80.4
3	Isabella Wranå (SWE)	92	92	80	65	48	86	79	88	84	80.0
4	Stefania Constantini (ITA)	75	63	69	80	77	77	98	84	89	79.2
5	Jocelyn Peterman (CAN)	88	78	83	88	67	65	75	72	79	76.7
6	Briar Schwaller-Hürlimann (SUI)	78	55	94	52	70	86	80	72	75	74.3
7	Kristin Skaslien (NOR)	58	77	72	90	67	73	66	70	77	71.5
8	Marie Kaldvee (EST)	71	55	78	64	72	78	64	72	66	69.2
9	Kim Seon-yeong (KOR)	67	57	72	39	63	79	86	78	75	68.8
10	Julie Zelingrová (CZE)	64	84	69	60	82	61	73	50	69	68.6

==== Male ====
#	Curler	1	2	3	4	5	6	7	8	9	Total
1	Korey Dropkin (USA)	80	77	91	85	77	81	90	89	95	84.9
2	Magnus Nedregotten (NOR)	90	73	74	83	79	77	79	92	80	80.7
3	Rasmus Wranå (SWE)	86	77	71	74	68	80	92	82	92	80.3
4	Brett Gallant (CAN)	88	72	82	80	78	75	65	81	97	79.6
5	Jeong Yeong-seok (KOR)	78	66	79	75	78	87	82	82	84	79.3
6	Bruce Mouat (GBR)	74	74	65	77	80	85	85	79	85	78.3
7	Amos Mosaner (ITA)	82	64	86	94	62	69	85	72	84	77.7
8	Yannick Schwaller (SUI)	63	72	86	61	79	88	77	72	73	74.6
9	Harri Lill (EST)	82	80	75	61	71	68	75	69	78	73.2
10	Vít Chabičovský (CZE)	55	56	78	68	75	73	82	68	69	69.4

==== Team total ====
#	Team	1	2	3	4	5	6	7	8	9	Total
1	United States	79	83	87	90	72	74	83	89	93	83.1
2	Sweden	88	83	74	71	60	83	86	84	89	80.1
3	Great Britain	76	79	70	79	79	83	88	81	82	79.6
4	Canada	88	74	83	83	74	71	69	78	90	78.5
5	Italy	79	63	79	88	68	72	90	76	86	78.3
6	Norway	77	74	73	86	74	76	74	83	79	77.1
7	South Korea	73	62	76	61	72	84	84	81	81	75.1
8	Switzerland	69	66	89	58	76	87	78	72	74	74.5
9	Estonia	78	70	76	63	71	72	71	70	73	71.6
10	Czech Republic	59	66	74	65	78	68	78	60	69	69.1
