= Popsie =

Swedish girl group

- Origin: Sweden
- Genres: Pop
- Years active: 1992–1999
- Past members: Cecilia Lind, Zandra Pettersson, Angelica Sanchez and Katarina Sundqvist

Popsie was a Swedish pop girl group consisting of Cecilia Lind, Zandra Pettersson, Angelica Sanchez and Katarina Sundqvist. Between 1997 and 1998 they had several charting songs on the Sverigetopplistan like "Single", "Joyful Life", "Latin Lover", "Rough Enough" and "24Seven".

== Discography ==
=== Singles ===
Title	Year	Peak chart positions				Album
Title	Year	SWE	AUS	NLD	NZ	Album
"Latin Lover"	1997	19	—	—	—	Popsie
"Single"	1997	14	69	80	5	Popsie
"Joyful Life"	1998	3	—	—	—	Popsie
"Rough Enough"	1998	11	—	—	—	Popsie
"24Seven"	1998	20	—	—	—	Popsie
