= Flemming Patz =

Swedish male curler and coach

- Curler ♂
- Born: 25 June 1967 (age 59)

Team
- Curling club: Örnsköldsviks CK, Örnsköldsvik, Östersunds CK, Östersund

Curling career
- Member Association: Sweden
- Other appearances: European Mixed Championship: 1 (2006)
Medal record
Curling
Swedish Mixed Championship
| Gold medal – first place | 1991 |
| Gold medal – first place | 2006 |

Jens Flemming Patz (born 25 June 1967) is a Swedish curler and curling coach.

He is a two-time Swedish mixed curling champion (1991, 2006).

== Teams ==
=== Men's ===
| Season | Skip | Third | Second | Lead |
|---|---|---|---|---|
| 2005–06 | Per Noreen | Jorgen Granberg | Stefan Nystrom | Flemming Patz |

=== Mixed ===
| Season | Skip | Third | Second | Lead | Coach | Events |
|---|---|---|---|---|---|---|
| 1990–91 | Rickard Hallström | Susanne Hallström | Flemming Patz | Tina Strömstedt | | SMxCC 1991 (gold) |
| 2005–06 | Per Noreen | Camilla Johansson | Flemming Patz | Susanne Patz | | SMxCC 2006 (gold) |
| 2006–07 | Per Noreen | Camilla Johansson | Flemming Patz | Susanne Patz | | EMxCC 2006 (4th) |
| 2013–14 | Mats Mabergs | Susanne Patz | Flemming Patz | Monika Mabergs | | SMxCC 2014 (5th) |
| 2014–15 | Mats Mabergs | Susanne Patz | Flemming Patz | Monika Mabergs | | SMxCC 2015 (4th) |
| 2015–16 | Mats Mabergs | Susanne Patz | Flemming Patz | Monika Mabergs | | SMxCC 2016 (13th) |
| 2016–17 | Oskar Sjöström | Susanne Patz | Flemming Patz | Maria Carlsen | Jörgen Svensson | SMxCC 2017 (9th) |
| 2017–18 | Filip Stener (fourth) | Susanne Patz | Flemming Patz (skip) | Åsa Linderholm | | SMxCC 2018 (9th) |
| 2018–19 | Mats Wranå | Susanne Patz | Flemming Patz | Monica Wranå | | SMxCC 2019 (9th) |

== Record as a coach of national teams ==
| Year | Tournament, event | National team | Place |
|---|---|---|---|
| 2013 | 2013 World Junior Curling Championships | Sweden (junior men) | 4 |
| 2015 | 2015 Winter Universiade | Sweden (students men) | 4 |
| 2017 | 2017 Winter Universiade | Sweden (students men) | 2nd place, silver medalist(s) |
| 2017 | 2017 World Mixed Curling Championship | Sweden (mixed) | 5 |

== Personal life ==
Flemming Patz is from well a known Swedish family of curlers, which includes his brother Rickard Hallström (who is also a coach), his sister Susanne, and his son Johannes .
