= 2019 World Men's Curling Championship =

- Host city: Lethbridge, Alberta, Canada
- Arena: ENMAX Centre
- Dates: March 30 – April 7, 2019
- Attendance: 69,077
- Winner: Sweden
- Curling club: Karlstads CK, Karlstad
- Skip: Niklas Edin
- Third: Oskar Eriksson
- Second: Rasmus Wranå
- Lead: Christoffer Sundgren
- Alternate: Daniel Magnusson
- Coach: Fredrik Lindberg
- Finalist: Canada (Koe)

The 2019 World Men's Curling Championship (branded as the 2019 Pioneer Hi-Bred World Men's Curling Championship for sponsorship reasons) was held from March 30 to April 7 at the ENMAX Centre in Lethbridge, Alberta, Canada.

== Qualification ==
The following nations are qualified to participate in the 2019 World Men's Curling Championship:

- Canada (host country)
- One team from the 2018 Americas Challenge (Note: As the zone with the automatically qualifying host country, the Americas zone loses one guaranteed berth.)
  - United States
- Seven teams from the 2018 European Curling Championships (Note: As the zone with the lowest-placed team in the 2018 World Men's Curling Championship, the European zone loses one guaranteed berth.)
  - Sweden
  - Scotland
  - Italy
  - Germany
  - Norway
  - Switzerland
  - Russia
- Two teams from the 2018 Pacific-Asia Curling Championships
  - China
  - Japan
- Two teams from the 2019 World Qualification Event
  - South Korea
  - Netherlands

== Teams ==
The teams are as follows:

Canada	China	Germany	Italy	Japan
The Glencoe Club, Calgary Skip: Kevin Koe; Third: B.J. Neufeld; Second: Colton Flasch; Lead: Ben Hebert; Alternate: Ted Appelman	Harbin CC, Harbin Skip: Zou Qiang; Third: Wang Zhiyu; Second: Shao Zhilin; Lead: Xu Jingtao; Alternate: Ba Dexin	EC Oberstdorf, Oberstdorf Skip: Marc Muskatewitz; Third: Daniel Neuner; Second: Ryan Sherrard; Lead: Dominik Greindl; Alternate: Benjamin Kapp	SC Pinerolo, Pinerolo Skip: Joël Retornaz; Third: Amos Mosaner; Second: Sebastiano Arman; Lead: Simone Gonin; Alternate: Alberto Pimpini	Hokkaido Consadole Sapporo CC, Tokoro Skip: Yuta Matsumura; Third: Tetsuro Shimizu; Second: Yasumasa Tanida; Lead: Shinya Abe; Alternate: Kosuke Aita
Netherlands	Norway	Russia	Scotland	South Korea
CC PWA Zoetermeer, Zoetermeer Fourth: Wouter Gösgens; Skip: Jaap van Dorp; Second: Laurens Hoekman; Lead: Carlo Glasbergen; Alternate: Bart Klomp	Oppdal CK, Oppdal Skip: Magnus Ramsfjell; Third: Michael Mellemseter; Second: Jørgen Myran; Lead: Andreas Hårstad; Alternate: Steffen Walstad	Ice Cube CC, Sochi Skip: Sergey Glukhov; Third: Artur Ali; Second: Dmitry Mironov; Lead: Anton Kalalb; Alternate: Evgeny Klimov	Gogar Park CC, Edinburgh Skip: Bruce Mouat; Third: Grant Hardie; Second: Bobby Lammie; Lead: Hammy McMillan Jr. Alternate: Ross Whyte	Seoul CC, Seoul Skip: Kim Soo-hyuk; Third: Lee Jeong-jae; Second: Hwang Hyeon-jun; Lead: Jeong Byeong-jin; Alternate: Lee Dong-hyeong
Sweden	Switzerland	United States		
Karlstads CK, Karlstad Skip: Niklas Edin; Third: Oskar Eriksson; Second: Rasmus Wranå; Lead: Christoffer Sundgren; Alternate: Daniel Magnusson	CC Genève, Geneva & Interlaken CC, Interlaken Fourth: Benoît Schwarz; Third: Sven Michel; Skip: Peter de Cruz; Lead: Valentin Tanner; Alternate: Claudio Pätz	Duluth CC, Duluth Skip: John Shuster; Third: Christopher Plys; Second: Matt Hamilton; Lead: John Landsteiner; Alternate: Korey Dropkin		

=== WCT ranking ===
Year to date World Curling Tour order of merit ranking for each team prior to the event.

Nation (Skip)	Rank	Points
Canada (Koe)	1	431.406
Scotland (Mouat)	4	355.316
Sweden (Edin)	5	354.921
Switzerland (de Cruz)	9	291.162
United States (Shuster)	13	242.221
Japan (Matsumura)	21	165.873
Netherlands (van Dorp)	30	117.489
Italy (Retornaz)	46	91.666
South Korea (Kim)	49	89.474
China (Zou)	54	77.239
Russia (Glukhov)	56	74.037
Norway (Ramsfjell)	74	53.765
Germany (Muskatewitz)	146	25.565

== Round-robin standings ==
Final round-robin standings

Key
Teams to playoffs

Country	Skip	W	L	W–L	PF	PA	EW	EL	BE	SE	S%	DSC
Sweden	Niklas Edin	11	1	–	99	50	51	40	4	10	89%	15.46
Switzerland	Peter de Cruz	9	3	1–1	84	67	52	45	8	12	88%	22.95
Canada	Kevin Koe	9	3	1–1	80	63	51	41	9	8	87%	30.92
Japan	Yuta Matsumura	9	3	1–1	83	72	50	44	7	9	86%	36.60
United States	John Shuster	8	4	1–0	82	63	50	42	6	13	87%	35.60
Scotland	Bruce Mouat	8	4	0–1	86	60	53	42	11	11	87%	18.72
Italy	Joël Retornaz	7	5	–	74	64	43	46	10	7	83%	30.03
Germany	Marc Muskatewitz	4	8	2–0	65	86	42	47	5	4	76%	38.24
Russia	Sergey Glukhov	4	8	1–1	62	85	42	48	9	7	81%	26.65
Netherlands	Jaap van Dorp	4	8	0–2	69	81	50	53	3	10	83%	35.47
China	Zou Qiang	2	10	1–0	60	92	42	53	8	6	81%	29.96
Norway	Magnus Ramsfjell	2	10	0–1	56	97	44	50	4	9	76%	54.19
South Korea	Kim Soo-hyuk	1	11	–	65	92	43	56	9	6	78%	38.69

== Round-robin results ==
All draw times are listed in Mountain Time (UTC-06:00).

=== Draw 1 ===
Saturday, March 30, 14:00

Sheet A	1	2	3	4	5	6	7	8	9	10	11	Final
Canada (Koe)	0	3	0	0	1	0	0	0	1	0	1	6
South Korea (Kim) 🔨	1	0	0	1	0	1	0	0	0	2	0	5

Sheet B	1	2	3	4	5	6	7	8	9	10	Final
Japan (Matsumura)	0	0	1	0	0	1	0	0	3	1	6
Italy (Retornaz) 🔨	0	1	0	0	2	0	0	1	0	0	4

Sheet C	1	2	3	4	5	6	7	8	9	10	Final
Netherlands (van Dorp)	0	2	0	1	0	0	0	1	0	2	6
United States (Shuster) 🔨	0	0	1	0	1	1	0	0	2	0	5

Sheet D	1	2	3	4	5	6	7	8	9	10	Final
Scotland (Mouat) 🔨	2	0	0	1	0	2	1	2	X	X	8
Russia (Glukhov)	0	1	0	0	1	0	0	0	X	X	2

=== Draw 2 ===
Saturday, March 30, 19:00

Sheet A	1	2	3	4	5	6	7	8	9	10	Final
Norway (Ramsfjell) 🔨	0	1	0	1	1	0	1	0	0	X	4
Switzerland (de Cruz)	1	0	2	0	0	3	0	2	2	X	10

Sheet B	1	2	3	4	5	6	7	8	9	10	Final
Canada (Koe) 🔨	3	0	2	0	3	0	3	X	X	X	11
Russia (Glukhov)	0	1	0	1	0	1	0	X	X	X	3

Sheet C	1	2	3	4	5	6	7	8	9	10	Final
Sweden (Edin)	0	2	0	2	3	0	1	0	1	X	9
China (Zou) 🔨	1	0	0	0	0	2	0	1	0	X	4

Sheet D	1	2	3	4	5	6	7	8	9	10	Final
Germany (Muskatewitz) 🔨	1	0	0	0	1	0	1	0	X	X	3
Italy (Retornaz)	0	1	0	2	0	4	0	2	X	X	9

=== Draw 3 ===
Sunday, March 31, 09:00

Sheet A	1	2	3	4	5	6	7	8	9	10	Final
China (Zou) 🔨	0	1	0	0	2	0	0	3	0	0	6
Japan (Matsumura)	0	0	4	1	0	0	3	0	0	1	9

Sheet B	1	2	3	4	5	6	7	8	9	10	Final
Switzerland (de Cruz)	0	1	0	0	2	1	0	0	0	1	5
Scotland (Mouat) 🔨	0	0	1	1	0	0	0	1	1	0	4

Sheet C	1	2	3	4	5	6	7	8	9	10	11	Final
South Korea (Kim)	0	2	0	0	1	0	2	0	3	1	0	9
Germany (Muskatewitz) 🔨	2	0	2	1	0	1	0	3	0	0	1	10

Sheet D	1	2	3	4	5	6	7	8	9	10	Final
Sweden (Edin) 🔨	2	1	1	0	4	0	0	0	1	X	9
Netherlands (van Dorp)	0	0	0	1	0	1	1	1	0	X	4

=== Draw 4 ===
Sunday, March 31, 14:00

Sheet A	1	2	3	4	5	6	7	8	9	10	Final
Scotland (Mouat) 🔨	1	0	0	1	1	0	0	0	1	0	4
Netherlands (van Dorp)	0	1	0	0	0	1	0	0	0	3	5

Sheet B	1	2	3	4	5	6	7	8	9	10	Final
United States (Shuster)	0	0	2	0	0	2	1	1	0	X	6
South Korea (Kim) 🔨	1	0	0	1	0	0	0	0	1	X	3

Sheet C	1	2	3	4	5	6	7	8	9	10	Final
Italy (Retornaz) 🔨	0	2	1	0	1	0	1	0	0	X	5
Canada (Koe)	1	0	0	1	0	2	0	2	3	X	9

Sheet D	1	2	3	4	5	6	7	8	9	10	Final
Japan (Matsumura) 🔨	0	5	0	1	0	1	0	2	0	X	9
Norway (Ramsfjell)	0	0	1	0	2	0	1	0	2	X	6

=== Draw 5 ===
Sunday, March 31, 19:00

Sheet A	1	2	3	4	5	6	7	8	9	10	Final
Germany (Muskatewitz) 🔨	1	0	0	0	2	0	1	0	2	0	6
United States (Shuster)	0	0	2	3	0	0	0	2	0	1	8

Sheet B	1	2	3	4	5	6	7	8	9	10	Final
Norway (Ramsfjell)	0	2	0	2	0	1	X	X	X	X	5
Sweden (Edin) 🔨	5	0	2	0	4	0	X	X	X	X	11

Sheet C	1	2	3	4	5	6	7	8	9	10	Final
Russia (Glukhov) 🔨	2	0	1	0	1	0	2	0	1	0	7
Switzerland (de Cruz)	0	2	0	3	0	1	0	2	0	1	9

Sheet D	1	2	3	4	5	6	7	8	9	10	Final
China (Zou) 🔨	2	0	1	0	2	0	1	0	0	X	6
Canada (Koe)	0	1	0	4	0	2	0	0	1	X	8

=== Draw 6 ===
Monday, April 1, 09:00

Sheet A	1	2	3	4	5	6	7	8	9	10	11	Final
South Korea (Kim)	0	1	0	0	0	0	0	2	1	0	0	4
Russia (Glukhov) 🔨	0	0	0	1	1	0	0	0	0	2	2	6

Sheet B	1	2	3	4	5	6	7	8	9	10	11	Final
Netherlands (van Dorp)	0	3	1	0	0	1	0	0	0	2	0	7
Japan (Matsumura) 🔨	2	0	0	1	2	0	0	0	2	0	2	9

Sheet C	1	2	3	4	5	6	7	8	9	10	Final
Germany (Muskatewitz)	0	1	0	1	0	0	X	X	X	X	2
Sweden (Edin) 🔨	2	0	2	0	0	4	X	X	X	X	8

=== Draw 7 ===
Monday, April 1, 14:00

Sheet A	1	2	3	4	5	6	7	8	9	10	Final
Netherlands (van Dorp)	0	2	0	0	0	1	0	0	2	1	6
Switzerland (de Cruz) 🔨	2	0	1	1	1	0	0	2	0	0	7

Sheet B	1	2	3	4	5	6	7	8	9	10	Final
Italy (Retornaz) 🔨	1	0	3	1	0	0	3	X	X	X	8
China (Zou)	0	1	0	0	0	1	0	X	X	X	2

Sheet C	1	2	3	4	5	6	7	8	9	10	Final
Canada (Koe) 🔨	2	0	5	1	0	2	X	X	X	X	10
Norway (Ramsfjell)	0	1	0	0	1	0	X	X	X	X	2

Sheet D	1	2	3	4	5	6	7	8	9	10	Final
United States (Shuster)	0	2	0	1	0	3	0	1	0	2	9
Scotland (Mouat) 🔨	2	0	1	0	1	0	1	0	3	0	8

=== Draw 8 ===
Monday, April 1, 19:00

Sheet A	1	2	3	4	5	6	7	8	9	10	Final
Sweden (Edin) 🔨	1	0	3	0	3	0	1	X	X	X	8
Japan (Matsumura)	0	1	0	1	0	1	0	X	X	X	3

Sheet B	1	2	3	4	5	6	7	8	9	10	Final
Russia (Glukhov)	0	1	0	1	0	1	0	0	X	X	3
United States (Shuster) 🔨	0	0	2	0	4	0	1	3	X	X	10

Sheet C	1	2	3	4	5	6	7	8	9	10	Final
China (Zou) 🔨	1	0	2	0	0	2	2	0	0	2	9
South Korea (Kim)	0	5	0	0	1	0	0	1	1	0	8

Sheet D	1	2	3	4	5	6	7	8	9	10	Final
Switzerland (de Cruz) 🔨	2	0	2	0	2	1	0	2	0	X	9
Germany (Muskatewitz)	0	2	0	1	0	0	1	0	2	X	6

=== Draw 9 ===
Tuesday, April 2, 09:00

Sheet B	1	2	3	4	5	6	7	8	9	10	11	Final
Japan (Matsumura)	0	1	0	1	0	2	0	1	2	0	1	8
South Korea (Kim) 🔨	2	0	2	0	2	0	0	0	0	1	0	7

Sheet C	1	2	3	4	5	6	7	8	9	10	Final
Scotland (Mouat) 🔨	1	0	1	0	1	1	0	1	0	1	6
Sweden (Edin)	0	1	0	1	0	0	1	0	2	0	5

Sheet D	1	2	3	4	5	6	7	8	9	10	Final
Norway (Ramsfjell)	0	1	0	1	0	1	1	0	X	X	4
Italy (Retornaz) 🔨	2	0	1	0	2	0	0	5	X	X	10

=== Draw 10 ===
Tuesday, April 2, 14:00

Sheet A	1	2	3	4	5	6	7	8	9	10	Final
Switzerland (de Cruz) 🔨	2	0	0	0	0	1	0	0	4	X	7
United States (Shuster)	0	2	0	0	0	0	1	1	0	X	4

Sheet B	1	2	3	4	5	6	7	8	9	10	Final
Germany (Muskatewitz) 🔨	1	0	0	1	0	0	2	0	0	X	4
Canada (Koe)	0	1	2	0	0	3	0	0	1	X	7

Sheet C	1	2	3	4	5	6	7	8	9	10	Final
Norway (Ramsfjell) 🔨	0	2	0	1	0	2	0	2	2	X	9
Netherlands (van Dorp)	1	0	2	0	0	0	1	0	0	X	4

Sheet D	1	2	3	4	5	6	7	8	9	10	Final
Russia (Glukhov)	0	1	0	1	1	0	1	3	X	X	7
China (Zou) 🔨	1	0	0	0	0	0	0	0	X	X	1

=== Draw 11 ===
Tuesday, April 2, 19:00

Sheet A	1	2	3	4	5	6	7	8	9	10	Final
Italy (Retornaz) 🔨	0	1	0	2	0	0	0	0	0	2	5
Russia (Glukhov)	0	0	2	0	0	0	1	0	0	0	3

Sheet B	1	2	3	4	5	6	7	8	9	10	Final
Sweden (Edin) 🔨	0	1	0	3	0	3	0	2	X	X	9
Switzerland (de Cruz)	1	0	1	0	1	0	1	0	X	X	4

Sheet C	1	2	3	4	5	6	7	8	9	10	Final
Japan (Matsumura) 🔨	2	0	0	2	0	0	2	0	0	X	6
Germany (Muskatewitz)	0	2	0	0	0	1	0	0	1	X	4

Sheet D	1	2	3	4	5	6	7	8	9	10	Final
South Korea (Kim)	0	2	0	0	0	0	1	0	X	X	3
Scotland (Mouat) 🔨	1	0	2	0	2	0	0	2	X	X	7

=== Draw 12 ===
Wednesday, April 3, 09:00

Sheet A	1	2	3	4	5	6	7	8	9	10	Final
China (Zou) 🔨	1	0	1	0	1	0	2	0	0	X	5
Netherlands (van Dorp)	0	3	0	2	0	2	0	1	2	X	10

Sheet B	1	2	3	4	5	6	7	8	9	10	Final
Scotland (Mouat) 🔨	2	0	0	3	0	2	1	0	X	X	8
Norway (Ramsfjell)	0	1	1	0	1	0	0	1	X	X	4

Sheet C	1	2	3	4	5	6	7	8	9	10	Final
United States (Shuster) 🔨	1	0	1	1	0	3	0	2	X	X	8
Italy (Retornaz)	0	1	0	0	0	0	2	0	X	X	3

Sheet D	1	2	3	4	5	6	7	8	9	10	Final
Canada (Koe)	0	1	0	2	0	0	X	X	X	X	3
Japan (Matsumura) 🔨	2	0	5	0	1	1	X	X	X	X	9

=== Draw 13 ===
Wednesday, April 3, 14:00

Sheet A	1	2	3	4	5	6	7	8	9	10	Final
Germany (Muskatewitz)	1	0	0	0	0	0	1	0	1	X	3
Norway (Ramsfjell) 🔨	0	0	0	0	1	2	0	2	0	X	5

Sheet B	1	2	3	4	5	6	7	8	9	10	Final
China (Zou) 🔨	2	1	0	1	0	0	0	1	0	0	5
United States (Shuster)	0	0	1	0	2	2	0	0	1	1	7

Sheet C	1	2	3	4	5	6	7	8	9	10	Final
Switzerland (de Cruz) 🔨	2	1	0	2	6	0	X	X	X	X	11
South Korea (Kim)	0	0	1	0	0	1	X	X	X	X	2

Sheet D	1	2	3	4	5	6	7	8	9	10	Final
Russia (Glukhov)	0	0	0	1	0	3	0	1	0	X	5
Sweden (Edin) 🔨	2	1	1	0	2	0	2	0	1	X	9

=== Draw 14 ===
Wednesday, April 3, 19:00

Sheet A	1	2	3	4	5	6	7	8	9	10	Final
Japan (Matsumura)	0	2	0	2	2	0	1	0	0	1	8
Scotland (Mouat) 🔨	0	0	1	0	0	3	0	2	0	0	6

Sheet B	1	2	3	4	5	6	7	8	9	10	Final
South Korea (Kim) 🔨	1	0	0	0	0	2	0	1	0	X	4
Italy (Retornaz)	0	1	1	1	0	0	2	0	4	X	9

Sheet C	1	2	3	4	5	6	7	8	9	10	Final
Sweden (Edin) 🔨	0	1	0	0	2	0	3	3	X	X	9
Canada (Koe)	0	0	0	2	0	2	0	0	X	X	4

Sheet D	1	2	3	4	5	6	7	8	9	10	Final
Netherlands (van Dorp) 🔨	1	0	1	0	0	1	0	2	1	0	6
Germany (Muskatewitz)	0	0	0	0	2	0	2	0	0	3	7

=== Draw 15 ===
Thursday, April 4, 09:00

Sheet A	1	2	3	4	5	6	7	8	9	10	Final
United States (Shuster)	0	1	0	0	0	0	0	2	0	X	3
Canada (Koe) 🔨	1	0	0	0	0	2	1	0	2	X	6

Sheet B	1	2	3	4	5	6	7	8	9	10	Final
Russia (Glukhov) 🔨	3	0	1	0	2	0	0	1	0	X	7
Netherlands (van Dorp)	0	1	0	1	0	1	0	0	1	X	4

Sheet C	1	2	3	4	5	6	7	8	9	10	Final
Norway (Ramsfjell) 🔨	0	0	1	0	1	0	1	0	0	X	3
China (Zou)	1	1	0	1	0	2	0	2	1	X	8

Sheet D	1	2	3	4	5	6	7	8	9	10	11	Final
Italy (Retornaz)	0	0	2	0	0	0	2	0	1	0	1	6
Switzerland (de Cruz) 🔨	0	1	0	0	1	0	0	1	0	2	0	5

=== Draw 16 ===
Thursday, April 4, 14:00

Sheet A	1	2	3	4	5	6	7	8	9	10	Final
South Korea (Kim)	1	0	0	1	0	2	0	0	1	X	5
Sweden (Edin) 🔨	0	1	2	0	1	0	3	0	0	X	7

Sheet B	1	2	3	4	5	6	7	8	9	10	11	Final
Switzerland (de Cruz) 🔨	1	0	0	1	1	0	1	0	1	0	1	6
Japan (Matsumura)	0	1	0	0	0	1	0	2	0	1	0	5

Sheet C	1	2	3	4	5	6	7	8	9	10	Final
Germany (Muskatewitz) 🔨	3	0	1	0	3	0	2	0	3	X	12
Russia (Glukhov)	0	2	0	1	0	2	0	1	0	X	6

Sheet D	1	2	3	4	5	6	7	8	9	10	Final
Scotland (Mouat) 🔨	2	0	1	0	1	0	0	1	0	4	9
China (Zou)	0	2	0	1	0	1	0	0	2	0	6

=== Draw 17 ===
Thursday, April 4, 19:00

Sheet A	1	2	3	4	5	6	7	8	9	10	Final
Netherlands (van Dorp) 🔨	0	0	1	0	1	1	0	1	0	X	4
Italy (Retornaz)	0	1	0	1	0	0	2	0	2	X	6

Sheet B	1	2	3	4	5	6	7	8	9	10	Final
Canada (Koe) 🔨	1	0	0	1	2	0	0	0	2	0	6
Scotland (Mouat)	0	2	1	0	0	0	0	2	0	3	8

Sheet C	1	2	3	4	5	6	7	8	9	10	Final
United States (Shuster) 🔨	3	0	2	1	0	1	0	3	X	X	10
Japan (Matsumura)	0	1	0	0	1	0	2	0	X	X	4

Sheet D	1	2	3	4	5	6	7	8	9	10	Final
Norway (Ramsfjell)	1	0	1	0	1	1	0	0	1	X	5
South Korea (Kim) 🔨	0	3	0	3	0	0	1	1	0	X	8

=== Draw 18 ===
Friday, April 5, 09:00

Sheet A	1	2	3	4	5	6	7	8	9	10	Final
Russia (Glukhov) 🔨	4	0	0	1	0	2	0	0	0	1	8
Norway (Ramsfjell)	0	2	1	0	1	0	0	1	0	0	5

Sheet B	1	2	3	4	5	6	7	8	9	10	Final
China (Zou) 🔨	1	0	0	2	0	0	0	1	0	X	4
Germany (Muskatewitz)	0	2	0	0	1	0	2	0	1	X	6

Sheet C	1	2	3	4	5	6	7	8	9	10	Final
Canada (Koe) 🔨	2	5	0	2	0	1	X	X	X	X	10
Switzerland (de Cruz)	0	0	1	0	2	0	X	X	X	X	3

Sheet D	1	2	3	4	5	6	7	8	9	10	Final
Sweden (Edin) 🔨	2	0	0	0	1	0	4	0	1	X	8
United States (Shuster)	0	2	0	0	0	1	0	1	0	X	4

=== Draw 19 ===
Friday, April 5, 14:00

Sheet A	1	2	3	4	5	6	7	8	9	10	Final
Scotland (Mouat) 🔨	4	1	0	3	0	1	X	X	X	X	9
Germany (Muskatewitz)	0	0	1	0	1	0	X	X	X	X	2

Sheet B	1	2	3	4	5	6	7	8	9	10	Final
Italy (Retornaz) 🔨	0	0	2	0	1	0	0	1	0	0	4
Sweden (Edin)	0	1	0	1	0	2	0	0	2	1	7

Sheet C	1	2	3	4	5	6	7	8	9	10	Final
South Korea (Kim) 🔨	1	0	2	0	1	0	1	0	2	0	7
Netherlands (van Dorp)	0	2	0	1	0	2	0	2	0	1	8

Sheet D	1	2	3	4	5	6	7	8	9	10	Final
Japan (Matsumura)	0	1	0	3	0	0	0	2	0	1	7
Russia (Glukhov) 🔨	0	0	1	0	0	0	2	0	2	0	5

=== Draw 20 ===
Friday, April 5, 19:00

Sheet A	1	2	3	4	5	6	7	8	9	10	Final
Switzerland (de Cruz) 🔨	0	2	0	1	2	0	1	0	2	X	8
China (Zou)	0	0	2	0	0	1	0	1	0	X	4

Sheet B	1	2	3	4	5	6	7	8	9	10	Final
United States (Shuster) 🔨	2	1	1	0	1	0	1	0	2	X	8
Norway (Ramsfjell)	0	0	0	2	0	1	0	1	0	X	4

Sheet C	1	2	3	4	5	6	7	8	9	10	Final
Italy (Retornaz)	0	2	0	2	0	1	0	0	0	X	5
Scotland (Mouat) 🔨	1	0	2	0	2	0	0	3	1	X	9

Sheet D	1	2	3	4	5	6	7	8	9	10	Final
Netherlands (van Dorp)	0	1	0	1	0	1	0	0	1	1	5
Canada (Koe) 🔨	1	0	1	0	2	0	1	1	0	0	6

== Playoffs ==
Qualification games
4	Japan	7
5	United States	6
3	Canada	6
6	Scotland	5

Semifinals
1	Sweden	8
4	Japan	2
2	Switzerland	5
3	Canada	6

Final
1	Sweden	7
3	Canada	2
Bronze medal game
4	Japan	4
2	Switzerland	8

=== Qualification games ===
Saturday, April 6, 09:00

Sheet A	1	2	3	4	5	6	7	8	9	10	Final
Canada (Koe) 🔨	2	0	2	0	0	0	1	0	1	0	6
Scotland (Mouat)	0	1	0	2	0	0	0	1	0	1	5

Player percentages
Canada		Scotland	
Ben Hebert	91%	Hammy McMillan Jr.	94%
Colton Flasch	79%	Bobby Lammie	90%
B.J. Neufeld	83%	Grant Hardie	84%
Kevin Koe	94%	Bruce Mouat	85%
Total	87%	Total	88%

Sheet C	1	2	3	4	5	6	7	8	9	10	11	Final
Japan (Matsumura) 🔨	2	0	0	2	0	0	1	0	1	0	1	7
United States (Shuster)	0	1	1	0	1	1	0	0	0	2	0	6

Player percentages
Japan		United States	
Shinya Abe	90%	John Landsteiner	92%
Yasumasa Tanida	83%	Matt Hamilton	82%
Tetsuro Shimizu	80%	Chris Plys	77%
Yuta Matsumura	90%	John Shuster	85%
Total	86%	Total	84%

=== Semifinal 1 ===
Saturday, April 6, 14:00

Sheet B	1	2	3	4	5	6	7	8	9	10	Final
Sweden (Edin) 🔨	2	0	0	3	0	0	2	1	X	X	8
Japan (Matsumura)	0	1	0	0	0	1	0	0	X	X	2

Player percentages
Sweden		Japan	
Christoffer Sundgren	95%	Shinya Abe	94%
Rasmus Wranå	97%	Yasumasa Tanida	86%
Oskar Eriksson	84%	Tetsuro Shimizu	86%
Niklas Edin	92%	Yuta Matsumura	75%
Total	92%	Total	85%

=== Semifinal 2 ===
Saturday, April 6, 19:00

Sheet B	1	2	3	4	5	6	7	8	9	10	11	Final
Switzerland (de Cruz)	0	0	1	0	1	0	0	2	0	1	0	5
Canada (Koe) 🔨	0	2	0	0	0	1	0	0	2	0	1	6

Player percentages
Switzerland		Canada	
Valentin Tanner	92%	Ben Hebert	94%
Peter de Cruz	92%	Colton Flasch	85%
Sven Michel	81%	B.J. Neufeld	86%
Benoît Schwarz	93%	Kevin Koe	90%
Total	89%	Total	89%

=== Bronze medal game ===
Sunday, April 7, 12:00

Sheet B	1	2	3	4	5	6	7	8	9	10	Final
Japan (Matsumura)	0	0	0	3	0	1	0	0	0	X	4
Switzerland (de Cruz) 🔨	0	0	1	0	1	0	4	1	1	X	8

Player percentages
Japan		Switzerland	
Shinya Abe	100%	Valentin Tanner	85%
Yasumasa Tanida	86%	Peter de Cruz	97%
Tetsuro Shimizu	85%	Sven Michel	92%
Yuta Matsumura	85%	Benoît Schwarz	89%
Total	89%	Total	91%

=== Final ===
Sunday, April 7, 17:00

Sheet B	1	2	3	4	5	6	7	8	9	10	Final
Sweden (Edin) 🔨	0	0	0	1	0	1	0	2	3	X	7
Canada (Koe)	0	0	1	0	1	0	0	0	0	X	2

Player percentages
Sweden		Canada	
Christoffer Sundgren	99%	Ben Hebert	97%
Rasmus Wranå	89%	Colton Flasch	88%
Oskar Eriksson	89%	B.J. Neufeld	82%
Niklas Edin	90%	Kevin Koe	78%
Total	92%	Total	86%

== Final standings ==
Key
Zone loses one guaranteed berth in 2020 World Championship

Place	Team
1st place, gold medalist(s)	Sweden
2nd place, silver medalist(s)	Canada
3rd place, bronze medalist(s)	Switzerland
4	Japan
5	United States
6	Scotland
7	Italy
8	Germany
9	Russia
10	Netherlands
11	China
12	Norway
13	South Korea

== Statistics ==
=== Top 5 player percentages ===
Final round robin percentages; minimum 9 games

Leads	%
(Canada) Ben Hebert	94
(Switzerland) Valentin Tanner	94
(Scotland) Hammy McMillan Jr.	93
(Sweden) Christoffer Sundgren	93
(United States) John Landsteiner	91

Seconds	%
(Japan) Yasumasa Tanida	88
(Switzerland) Peter de Cruz (Skip)	87
(United States) Matt Hamilton	87
(Scotland) Bobby Lammie	87
(Sweden) Rasmus Wranå	87

Thirds	%
(Sweden) Oskar Eriksson	90
(Scotland) Grant Hardie	87
(Canada) B.J. Neufeld	87
(United States) Chris Plys	87
(Switzerland) Sven Michel	86

Skips	%
(Sweden) Niklas Edin	87
(Switzerland) Benoît Schwarz (Fourth)	86
(Canada) Kevin Koe	84
(Japan) Yuta Matsumura	83
(Scotland) Bruce Mouat	83
(Italy) Joël Retornaz	83
(United States) John Shuster	83

=== Perfect games ===
Player	Team	Position	Opponent
Ben Hebert	Canada	Lead	Switzerland
Valentin Tanner	Switzerland	Lead	Canada
Christoffer Sundgren	Sweden	Lead	Canada
John Landsteiner	United States	Lead	China
B.J. Neufeld	Canada	Third	Norway
Grant Hardie	Scotland	Third	Germany

== Awards ==
The awards and all-star team are as follows:

All-Star Team

- Skip: Niklas Edin, Sweden
- Third: Oskar Eriksson, Sweden
- Second: Yasumasa Tanida, Japan
- Lead: Ben Hebert, Canada

Collie Campbell Memorial Award

- Kim Soo-hyuk, South Korea
