= Zandra Flyg =

Swedish female curler and coach

- Curler ♀
- Born: 31 January 1988 (age 38); Stockholm

Team
- Curling club: Sundbybergs CK, Sundbyberg

Curling career
- Member Association: Sweden
- European Championship: 1 (2014)
- Other appearances: World Mixed Championship: 1 (2015), World Junior Championship: 1 (2009), Winter Universiade: 1 (2013)
Medal record
Curling
Swedish Women's Championship
Gold medal – first place	2011
Gold medal – first place	2014
Bronze medal – third place	2013
World Mixed Championship
Silver medal – second place	2015 Bern
Swedish Mixed Championship
Gold medal – first place	2015
Bronze medal – third place	2017

Zandra Rose-Marie Flyg (born 31 January 1988 in Stockholm) is a Swedish curler.

She is a two-time Swedish women's champion (2011, 2014) and a 2015 Swedish mixed champion.

== Teams ==
=== Women's ===
Season	Skip	Third	Second	Lead	Alternate	Coach	Events
2006–07	Anna Hasselborg	Zandra Flyg	Agnes Knochenhauer	Sabina Kraupp			
2008–09	Anna Hasselborg	Sabina Kraupp	Agnes Knochenhauer	Zandra Flyg			
2008–09	Anna Hasselborg	Agnes Knochenhauer	Sofie Sidén	Zandra Flyg	Sara McManus (WJCC)	Mikael Hasselborg	SWCC 2009 (gold); WJCC 2009 (6th)
2009–10	Maria Prytz	Margaretha Dryburgh	Sabina Kraupp	Zandra Flyg			
2010–11	Anna Hasselborg	Sabina Kraupp	Agnes Knochenhauer	Zandra Flyg			SWCC 2011 (gold)
2011–12	Anna Hasselborg	Sabina Kraupp	Margaretha Dryburgh	Zandra Flyg			
2012–13	Anna Hasselborg	Karin Rudström	Agnes Knochenhauer	Zandra Flyg		Björn Rudström	WUG 2013 (5th); SWCC 2013 (bronze)
2013–14	Anna Hasselborg	Karin Rudström	Agnes Knochenhauer	Zandra Flyg		Mikael Hasselborg	SWCC 2014 (gold)
2014–15	Anna Hasselborg	Agnes Knochenhauer	Karin Rudström	Zandra Flyg	Jonna McManus (ECC)	Mikael Hasselborg	ECC 2014 (5th); SWCC 2015 (5th)
2015–16	Maria Prytz (fourth)	Christina Bertrup	Zandra Flyg	Margaretha Sigfridsson (skip)			
2016–17	Emma Berg	Johanna Höglund	Anna Gustafsson	Zandra Flyg	Frida Jonasson		SWCC 2017 (4th)

=== Mixed ===
Season	Skip	Third	Second	Lead	Coach	Events
2012–13	Zandra Flyg (fourth)	Henrik Leek	Sara McManus	Alexander Lindström (skip)		SMxCC 2013 (???th)
2014—15	Rasmus Wranå	Zandra Flyg	Joakim Flyg	Johanna Heldin		SMxCC 2015 (gold)
2015—16	Rasmus Wranå	Zandra Flyg	Joakim Flyg	Johanna Heldin	Mats Wranå	WMxCC 2015 (silver)
2016–17	Emma Berg	Zandra Flyg	Axel Sjöberg	Fredrik Nyman		SMxCC 2017 (bronze)
2017–18	Fredrik Nyman (fourth)	Margaretha Sigfridsson (skip)	Joakim Flyg	Zandra Flyg		SMxCC 2018 (5th)
2018–19	Niclas Johansson	Zandra Flyg	Max Bäck	Karin Rudström	Emma Berg	SMxCC 2019 (4th)

== Record as a coach of national teams ==
Year	Tournament, event	National team	Place
2016	2016 World Mixed Curling Championship	Sweden (mixed)	2nd place, silver medalist(s)

== Personal life ==
Her brother is Swedish curler Joakim Flyg. They played together in the 2015 World Mixed Curling Championship and in several Swedish mixed championships.
