= 2012 European Mixed Curling Championship =

- Host city: Erzurum, Turkey
- Arena: Milli Piyango Curling Arena
- Dates: September 30 – October 6
- Winner: Scotland
- Skip: Ewan MacDonald
- Third: Eve Muirhead
- Second: Euan Byers
- Lead: Karen Barthelemy
- Finalist: Sweden (Rickard Hallström)

The 2012 European Mixed Curling Championship was held from September 30 to October 6 at the Milli Piyango Curling Arena in Erzurum, Turkey. In the final, Scotland, skipped by Ewan MacDonald, defeated Sweden, skipped by Rickard Hallström, with a score of 8–4.

== Teams ==
The teams are listed as follows:

=== Red Group ===
France	Ireland	Italy	Russia
Skip: Sandrine Leveque Third: Stephane Verganud; Second: Nathalie Leveque; Lead: Michel Duverne; Alternate: Anne Claire Beaubestre	Skip: Robin Gray Third: Louise Kerr; Second: John Kenny; Lead: Hazel Gormley-Leahy	Skip: Alessandro Zisa Third: Elettra de Col; Second: Alberto Alvera; Lead: Violetta Caldart; Alternate: Marco Mariani	Skip: Roman Kutuzov Third: Evgeniya Demkina; Second: Sergey Manulychev; Lead: Ekaterina Kuzmina; Alternates: Vadim Raev, Valeriya Shelkova
Scotland	Slovenia	Switzerland	Sweden
Skip: Ewan MacDonald Third: Eve Muirhead; Second: Euan Byers; Lead: Karen Barthelemy	Skip: Gregor Verbinc Third: Valentina Jurincic; Second: Jost Lajovec; Lead: Nadija Pipan; Alternate: Anja Kresnik	Skip: Martin Rios Third: Manuela Siegrist; Second: Romano Meier; Lead: Manuela Netzer-Kormann; Alternates: Rolf Hösli, Jenny Perret	Skip: Rickard Hallström Third: Elisabeth Norredahl; Second: Fredrik Hallström; Lead: Catrin Bitén

=== Blue Group ===
Czech Republic	Denmark	England	Estonia
Skip: David Sik Third: Eva Stampachová; Second: Marek David; Lead: Michala Souhradová; Alternates: Erik Sikl, Klara Bousková	Skip: Mikael Qvist Third: Trine Qvist; Second: Are Solberg; Lead: Kirsten Jensen	Skip: Bryan Zachary Third: Lauren Pearce; Second: Kerr Alexander; Lead: Naomi Robinson; Alternates: Kenneth Maxwell, Angharad Ward	Skip: Erkki Lill Third: Maile Mölder; Second: Andres Jakobson; Lead: Küllike Ustav
Netherlands	Norway	Slovakia	Turkey
Skip: Mark Neeleman Third: Marianne Neeleman; Second: Wim Neeleman; Lead: Els Neeleman	Skip: Steffen Walstad Third: Pia Trulsen; Second: Magnus Nedregotten; Lead: Ingvild Skaga	Skip: Pavol Pitoňák Third: Gabriela Kajanová; Second: Frantisek Pitoňák; Lead: Petra Pitoňáková	Skip: Murat Sağır Third: Elif Kızılkaya; Second: Ahmet Uysal; Lead: Öznur Polat; Alternate: Muhammet Oǧuz Zengin

=== Green Group ===
Austria	Belarus	Croatia	Finland
Skip: Karina Toth Third: Sebastian Wunderer; Second: Constanze Hummelt; Lead: Mathias Genner	Skip: Dimtry Kirillov Third: Alina Pauliuchyk; Second: Dzmitry Yarko; Lead: Ekaterina Kirillova	Skip: Neven Pufnik Third: Antonija Leko; Second: Dario Sojcic; Lead: Ines Misanec; Alternate: Domagoj Jakopovic	Skip: Aku Kauste Third: Sanna Puustinen; Second: Pauli Jäämies; Lead: Oona Kauste
Germany	Hungary	Latvia	Spain
Skip: Rainer Schöpp Third: Andrea Schöpp; Second: Florian Zahler; Lead: Imogen Lehmann; Alternate: Adolf Geiselhart	Fourth: Zsolt Kiss Third: Zsanett Gunzinam; Skip: György Nagy; Lead: Agnes Szentannai; Alternates: Monika Szarvas, Laszlo Kiss	Skip: Ansis Regza Third: Evita Regza; Second: Renars Freidensons; Lead: Dace Regza	Skip: Oihane Otaegi Third: Mikel Unanue; Second: Leire Otaegi; Lead: Iñaki Lasuen

== Round-robin standings ==
Final round-robin standings

Key
Teams to Playoffs

Red Group	Skip	W	L
Sweden	Rickard Hallström	7	0
Scotland	Ewan MacDonald	6	1
Switzerland	Martin Rios	4	3
Ireland	Robin Gray	4	3
Italy	Alessandro Zisa	3	4
Russia	Roman Kutuzov	3	4
France	Sandrine Leveque	1	6
Slovenia	Gregor Verbinc	0	7

Blue Group	Skip	W	L
Norway	Steffen Walsted	6	1
Czech Republic	David Sik	4	3
Denmark	Mikael Qvist	4	3
Estonia	Erkki Lill	4	3
Slovakia	Pavol Pitonak	4	3
Netherlands	Mark Neeleman	3	4
England	Bryan Zachary	2	5
Turkey	Murat Sagir	1	6

Green Group	Skip	W	L
Germany	Rainer Schöpp	6	1
Finland	Aku Kauste	5	2
Austria	Karina Toth	4	3
Hungary	György Nagy	4	3
Latvia	Ansis Regza	4	3
Spain	Oihane Otaegi	4	3
Belarus	Dimtry Kirillov	2	5
Croatia	Neven Pufnik	0	7

== Round-robin results ==
All draw times listed in Eastern European Summer Time (UTC+3).

=== Red Group ===
==== Monday, October 1 ====
Draw 3 12:30

Sheet A	1	2	3	4	5	6	7	8	Final
Switzerland (Rios)	0	0	2	0	0	0	2	X	4
Italy (Zisa)	2	1	0	1	1	2	0	X	7

Sheet B	1	2	3	4	5	6	7	8	Final
Scotland (MacDonald)	2	0	1	0	2	0	1	X	6
Russia (Kutuzov)	0	0	0	1	0	2	0	X	3

Sheet C	1	2	3	4	5	6	7	8	Final
France (Leveque)	0	1	0	1	0	0	X	X	2
Sweden (Hallström)	4	0	1	0	3	2	X	X	10

Sheet D	1	2	3	4	5	6	7	8	Final
Ireland (Gray)	0	2	2	1	1	1	1	X	8
Slovenia (Verbinc)	3	0	0	0	0	0	0	X	3

Draw 5 19:30

Sheet A	1	2	3	4	5	6	7	8	Final
Sweden (Hallström)	5	0	5	3	1	2	X	X	16
Slovenia (Verbinc)	0	2	0	0	0	0	X	X	2

Sheet B	1	2	3	4	5	6	7	8	Final
France (Leveque)	0	1	2	0	1	0	0	X	4
Ireland (Gray)	2	0	0	2	0	4	1	X	9

Sheet C	1	2	3	4	5	6	7	8	Final
Italy (Zisa)	1	0	0	1	0	0	1	X	3
Russia (Kutuzov)	0	2	1	0	1	1	0	X	5

Sheet D	1	2	3	4	5	6	7	8	Final
Switzerland (Rios)	0	1	0	2	0	1	0	X	4
Scotland (MacDonald)	0	0	1	0	4	0	2	X	7

==== Tuesday, October 2 ====
Draw 7 12:30

Sheet A	1	2	3	4	5	6	7	8	Final
France (Leveque)	0	0	0	1	0	0	X	X	1
Russia (Kutuzov)	4	1	2	0	2	2	X	X	11

Sheet B	1	2	3	4	5	6	7	8	Final
Switzerland (Rios)	3	2	0	2	0	0	4	X	11
Slovenia (Verbinc)	0	0	1	0	1	1	0	X	3

Sheet C	1	2	3	4	5	6	7	8	Final
Ireland (Gray)	1	0	2	1	0	0	0	X	4
Scotland (MacDonald)	0	1	0	0	4	1	2	X	8

Sheet D	1	2	3	4	5	6	7	8	Final
Italy (Zisa)	1	0	1	0	0	0	X	X	2
Sweden (Hallström)	0	5	0	2	1	2	X	X	10

Draw 9 19:30

Sheet A	1	2	3	4	5	6	7	8	9	Final
Scotland (MacDonald)	0	1	0	1	0	2	0	3	0	7
Sweden (Hallström)	1	0	3	0	2	0	1	0	1	8

Sheet B	1	2	3	4	5	6	7	8	Final
Ireland (Gray)	3	2	1	0	1	1	0	X	8
Italy (Zisa)	0	0	0	1	0	0	1	X	2

Sheet C	1	2	3	4	5	6	7	8	Final
Switzerland (Rios)	3	1	0	3	3	2	X	X	12
France (Leveque)	0	0	1	0	0	0	X	X	1

Sheet D	1	2	3	4	5	6	7	8	Final
Slovenia (Verbinc)	1	0	0	0	0	0	X	X	1
Russia (Kutuzov)	0	2	2	1	1	2	X	X	8

==== Wednesday, October 3 ====
Draw 10 9:00

Sheet E	1	2	3	4	5	6	7	8	Final
Ireland (Gray)	0	1	1	0	0	1	0	X	3
Switzerland (Rios)	4	0	0	1	2	0	1	X	8

Draw 11 12:30

Sheet E	1	2	3	4	5	6	7	8	Final
Russia (Kutuzov)	0	3	1	0	0	0	1	0	5
Sweden (Hallström)	2	0	0	2	1	1	0	1	7

Draw 12 16:00

Sheet E	1	2	3	4	5	6	7	8	Final
Scotland (MacDonald)	4	2	3	0	3	3	X	X	15
Slovenia (Verbinc)	0	0	0	1	0	0	X	X	1

Draw 13 19:30

Sheet E	1	2	3	4	5	6	7	8	Final
France (Leveque)	0	3	0	0	0	1	0	X	4
Italy (Zisa)	3	0	0	2	1	0	4	X	10

==== Thursday, October 4 ====
Draw 14 8:30

Sheet A	1	2	3	4	5	6	7	8	Final
Italy (Zisa)	0	0	0	1	0	1	0	X	2
Scotland (MacDonald)	0	1	1	0	5	0	1	X	8

Sheet B	1	2	3	4	5	6	7	8	Final
Slovenia (Verbinc)	0	0	0	2	0	2	0	X	4
France (Leveque)	1	3	1	0	1	0	2	X	8

Sheet C	1	2	3	4	5	6	7	8	Final
Russia (Kutuzov)	2	2	1	0	0	0	1	0	6
Switzerland (Rios)	0	0	0	2	2	1	0	2	7

Sheet D	1	2	3	4	5	6	7	8	Final
Sweden (Hallström)	0	1	0	1	1	0	1	1	5
Ireland (Gray)	1	0	2	0	0	1	0	0	4

Draw 16 15:30

Sheet A	1	2	3	4	5	6	7	8	Final
Russia (Kutuzov)	0	1	1	0	0	0	1	X	3
Ireland (Gray)	0	0	0	2	2	1	0	X	5

Sheet B	1	2	3	4	5	6	7	8	Final
Sweden (Hallström)	1	1	0	1	0	1	1	X	5
Switzerland (Rios)	0	0	1	0	1	0	0	X	2

Sheet C	1	2	3	4	5	6	7	8	Final
Slovenia (Verbinc)	0	2	0	1	0	1	0	X	4
Italy (Zisa)	1	0	3	0	2	0	3	X	9

Sheet D	1	2	3	4	5	6	7	8	Final
Scotland (MacDonald)	2	3	0	1	1	1	3	X	11
France (Leveque)	0	0	1	0	0	0	0	X	1

=== Blue Group ===
==== Sunday, September 30 ====
Draw 1 19:30

Sheet A	1	2	3	4	5	6	7	8	Final
Czech Republic (Sik)	0	0	1	2	0	3	0	X	6
Denmark (Qvist)	2	2	0	0	2	0	2	X	8

Sheet B	1	2	3	4	5	6	7	8	Final
Netherlands (Neeleman)	0	1	0	0	0	2	0	X	3
England (Zachary)	1	0	1	2	1	0	2	X	7

Sheet C	1	2	3	4	5	6	7	8	Final
Slovakia (Pitonak)	1	1	0	3	1	2	0	X	8
Estonia (Lill)	0	0	1	0	0	0	1	X	2

Sheet D	1	2	3	4	5	6	7	8	Final
Norway (Walsted)	2	0	2	0	2	0	1	X	7
Turkey (Sagir)	0	1	0	2	0	2	0	X	5

==== Monday, October 1 ====
Draw 2 9:00

Sheet E	1	2	3	4	5	6	7	8	Final
Estonia (Lill)	2	2	3	0	0	0	1	X	8
Turkey (Sagir)	0	0	0	1	1	1	0	X	3

Draw 3 12:30

Sheet E	1	2	3	4	5	6	7	8	Final
Slovakia (Pitonak)	0	0	2	3	0	0	1	0	6
Norway (Walsted)	1	1	0	0	3	2	0	1	8

Draw 4 16:00

Sheet E	1	2	3	4	5	6	7	8	Final
Denmark (Qvist)	0	0	2	0	1	1	1	1	6
England (Zachary)	1	1	0	3	0	0	0	0	5

Draw 5 19:30

Sheet E	1	2	3	4	5	6	7	8	Final
Czech Republic (Sik)	1	0	1	0	0	1	0	X	3
Netherlands (Neeleman)	0	2	0	1	2	0	2	X	7

==== Tuesday, October 2 ====
Draw 6 9:00

Sheet A	1	2	3	4	5	6	7	8	Final
Slovakia (Pitonak)	0	2	0	1	0	0	4	0	7
England (Zachary)	3	0	2	0	1	1	0	1	8

Sheet B	1	2	3	4	5	6	7	8	Final
Czech Republic (Sik)	0	2	3	1	0	0	0	X	6
Turkey (Sagir)	1	0	0	0	1	1	1	X	4

Sheet C	1	2	3	4	5	6	7	8	Final
Norway (Walsted)	3	0	0	0	0	2	0	X	7
Netherlands (Neeleman)	0	0	1	1	1	0	2	X	5

Sheet D	1	2	3	4	5	6	7	8	Final
Denmark (Qvist)	1	0	1	0	0	0	0	X	2
Estonia (Lill)	0	1	0	0	1	0	3	X	5

Draw 8 16:00

Sheet A	1	2	3	4	5	6	7	8	Final
Netherlands (Neeleman)	0	0	3	2	0	1	0	0	6
Estonia (Lill)	0	2	0	0	1	0	2	2	7

Sheet B	1	2	3	4	5	6	7	8	Final
Norway (Walsted)	2	0	1	1	2	0	0	0	6
Denmark (Qvist)	0	4	0	0	0	2	1	1	8

Sheet C	1	2	3	4	5	6	7	8	Final
Czech Republic (Sik)	1	0	0	2	0	1	0	1	5
Slovakia (Pitonak)	0	1	1	0	1	0	1	0	4

Sheet D	1	2	3	4	5	6	7	8	Final
Turkey (Sagir)	0	1	1	0	2	2	0	2	8
England (Zachary)	2	0	0	4	0	0	1	0	7

==== Wednesday, October 3 ====
Draw 11 12:30

Sheet A	1	2	3	4	5	6	7	8	Final
Norway (Walsted)	0	1	0	2	0	3	1	X	7
Czech Republic (Sik)	2	0	1	0	1	0	0	X	4

Sheet B	1	2	3	4	5	6	7	8	Final
England (Zachary)	1	1	0	0	1	0	2	0	5
Estonia (Lill)	0	0	0	3	0	2	0	2	7

Sheet C	1	2	3	4	5	6	7	8	Final
Netherlands (Neeleman)	0	1	1	0	1	0	2	1	6
Turkey (Sagir)	1	0	0	2	0	1	0	0	4

Sheet D	1	2	3	4	5	6	7	8	Final
Slovakia (Pitonak)	3	0	0	2	3	0	0	X	8
Denmark (Qvist)	0	3	1	0	0	2	1	X	7

Draw 13 19:30

Sheet A	1	2	3	4	5	6	7	8	Final
Denmark (Qvist)	0	2	0	0	2	0	1	0	5
Netherlands (Neeleman)	2	0	1	1	0	1	0	3	8

Sheet B	1	2	3	4	5	6	7	8	Final
Turkey (Sagir)	2	0	0	2	0	0	0	X	4
Slovakia (Pitonak)	0	1	2	0	4	1	1	X	9

Sheet C	1	2	3	4	5	6	7	8	Final
England (Zachary)	2	0	0	3	0	1	0	X	6
Czech Republic (Sik)	0	3	2	0	1	0	2	X	8

Sheet D	1	2	3	4	5	6	7	8	Final
Estonia (Lill)	1	0	0	0	1	0	1	0	3
Norway (Walsted)	0	1	0	0	0	2	0	1	4

==== Thursday, October 4 ====
Draw 14 8:30

Sheet E	1	2	3	4	5	6	7	8	Final
England (Zachary)	0	0	0	0	1	0	X	X	1
Norway (Walsted)	0	2	3	0	0	2	X	X	7

Draw 15 12:00

Sheet E	1	2	3	4	5	6	7	8	Final
Estonia (Lill)	0	0	0	0	1	0	0	X	1
Czech Republic (Sik)	2	0	0	1	0	1	0	X	4

Draw 16 15:30

Sheet E	1	2	3	4	5	6	7	8	Final
Turkey (Sagir)	0	1	0	0	2	0	0	X	3
Denmark (Qvist)	2	0	2	0	0	2	2	X	8

Draw 17 19:00

Sheet E	1	2	3	4	5	6	7	8	Final
Netherlands (Neeleman)	0	1	2	1	0	0	0	1	5
Slovakia (Pitonak)	3	0	0	0	0	3	0	0	6

=== Green Group ===
==== Monday, October 1 ====
Draw 2 9:00

Sheet A	1	2	3	4	5	6	7	8	Final
Germany (Schöpp)	2	0	0	0	1	3	2	X	8
Austria (Toth)	0	0	1	1	0	0	0	X	2

Sheet B	1	2	3	4	5	6	7	8	Final
Finland (Kauste)	0	1	0	0	0	1	1	X	3
Latvia (Regza)	2	0	4	1	0	0	0	X	7

Sheet C	1	2	3	4	5	6	7	8	Final
Hungary (Nagy)	0	0	0	0	4	1	0	3	8
Spain (Otaegi)	0	2	0	1	0	0	1	0	4

Sheet D	1	2	3	4	5	6	7	8	Final
Belarus (Kirillov)	1	1	0	2	3	0	0	2	9
Croatia (Pufnik)	0	0	2	0	0	1	1	0	4

Draw 4 16:00

Sheet A	1	2	3	4	5	6	7	8	Final
Spain (Otaegi)	2	0	1	2	0	1	2	X	8
Croatia (Pufnik)	0	1	0	0	1	0	0	X	2

Sheet B	1	2	3	4	5	6	7	8	Final
Hungary (Nagy)	0	1	0	1	0	0	2	2	6
Belarus (Kirillov)	2	0	0	0	1	1	0	0	4

Sheet C	1	2	3	4	5	6	7	8	Final
Austria (Toth)	0	2	0	0	2	4	X	X	8
Latvia (Regza)	0	0	0	1	0	0	X	X	1

Sheet D	1	2	3	4	5	6	7	8	Final
Germany (Schöpp)	0	2	1	1	0	2	0	3	9
Finland (Kauste)	1	0	0	0	2	0	1	0	4

==== Tuesday, October 2 ====
Draw 6 9:00

Sheet E	1	2	3	4	5	6	7	8	Final
Hungary (Nagy)	1	0	3	1	0	2	0	3	10
Latvia (Regza)	0	2	0	0	3	0	1	0	6

Draw 7 12:30

Sheet E	1	2	3	4	5	6	7	8	Final
Germany (Schöpp)	2	0	0	5	0	4	2	X	13
Croatia (Pufnik)	0	1	0	0	1	0	0	X	2

Draw 8 16:00

Sheet E	1	2	3	4	5	6	7	8	Final
Belarus (Kirillov)	1	0	1	0	0	1	0	X	3
Finland (Kauste)	0	2	0	1	1	0	4	X	8

Draw 9 19:30

Sheet E	1	2	3	4	5	6	7	8	Final
Austria (Toth)	0	0	2	0	1	0	1	0	4
Spain (Otaegi)	1	0	0	1	0	2	0	1	5

==== Wednesday, October 3 ====
Draw 10 9:00

Sheet A	1	2	3	4	5	6	7	8	Final
Finland (Kauste)	0	3	1	0	3	0	0	X	7
Spain (Otaegi)	1	0	0	1	0	2	1	X	5

Sheet B	1	2	3	4	5	6	7	8	Final
Belarus (Kirillov)	0	0	0	0	0	1	X	X	1
Austria (Toth)	5	0	0	0	2	0	X	X	7

Sheet C	1	2	3	4	5	6	7	8	Final
Germany (Schöpp)	1	0	1	0	1	0	0	3	6
Hungary (Nagy)	0	1	0	1	0	0	3	0	5

Sheet D	1	2	3	4	5	6	7	8	Final
Croatia (Pufnik)	0	0	0	0	1	0	X	X	1
Latvia (Regza)	3	2	2	3	0	6	X	X	16

Draw 12 16:00

Sheet A	1	2	3	4	5	6	7	8	Final
Belarus (Kirillov)	1	0	0	0	1	0	0	X	2
Germany (Schöpp)	0	3	0	0	0	1	0	X	4

Sheet B	1	2	3	4	5	6	7	8	Final
Latvia (Regza)	1	0	3	0	0	0	0	0	4
Spain (Otaegi)	0	0	0	2	1	1	1	2	7

Sheet C	1	2	3	4	5	6	7	8	Final
Finland (Kauste)	1	0	7	2	2	0	5	X	17
Croatia (Pufnik)	0	1	0	0	0	1	0	X	2

Sheet D	1	2	3	4	5	6	7	8	Final
Hungary (Nagy)	0	1	0	2	1	0	2	X	6
Austria (Toth)	2	0	4	0	0	2	0	X	8

==== Thursday, October 4 ====
Draw 15 12:00

Sheet A	1	2	3	4	5	6	7	8	Final
Austria (Toth)	0	0	1	0	1	0	0	X	2
Finland (Kauste)	1	1	0	3	0	1	3	X	9

Sheet B	1	2	3	4	5	6	7	8	Final
Croatia (Pufnik)	0	0	1	0	0	0	0	X	1
Hungary (Nagy)	1	1	0	5	0	2	2	X	11

Sheet C	1	2	3	4	5	6	7	8	Final
Latvia (Regza)	1	0	1	0	1	0	0	X	3
Germany (Schöpp)	0	1	0	0	0	0	1	X	2

Sheet D	1	2	3	4	5	6	7	8	Final
Spain (Otaegi)	0	0	1	0	0	0	0	X	1
Belarus (Kirillov)	0	1	0	1	1	1	0	X	4

Draw 17 19:00

Sheet A	1	2	3	4	5	6	7	8	Final
Latvia (Regza)	1	1	0	0	0	3	1	X	6
Belarus (Kirillov)	0	0	0	1	1	0	0	X	2

Sheet B	1	2	3	4	5	6	7	8	Final
Spain (Otaegi)	0	1	0	3	0	2	0	0	6
Germany (Schöpp)	0	0	3	0	1	0	2	1	7

Sheet C	1	2	3	4	5	6	7	8	Final
Croatia (Pufnik)	0	0	0	1	0	0	X	X	1
Austria (Toth)	2	3	2	0	3	1	X	X	11

Sheet D	1	2	3	4	5	6	7	8	Final
Finland (Kauste)	1	0	2	1	0	0	1	2	7
Hungary (Nagy)	0	1	0	0	0	2	0	0	3

== Playoffs ==
Quarterfinals
B1	Norway	3
G3	Austria	5
B2	Czech Republic	2
R2	Scotland	6
R3	Switzerland	3
R1	Sweden	4
G1	Germany	3
G2	Finland	7

Semifinals
G3	Austria	5
R2	Scotland	6
R1	Sweden	4
G2	Finland	3

Gold Medal Game
R2	Scotland	8
R1	Sweden	4

Bronze Medal Game
G3	Austria	3
G2	Finland	10

=== Quarterfinals ===
Friday, October 5, 9:00

Sheet D	1	2	3	4	5	6	7	8	Final
Norway (Walsted)	0	0	1	0	0	0	2	0	3
Austria (Toth)	0	1	0	0	3	1	0	0	5

Sheet B	1	2	3	4	5	6	7	8	Final
Czech Republic (Sik)	0	0	0	0	2	0	0	X	2
Scotland (MacDonald)	1	1	0	1	0	1	2	X	6

Sheet A	1	2	3	4	5	6	7	8	9	Final
Switzerland (Rios)	0	0	0	0	0	0	2	1	0	3
Sweden (Hallström)	0	0	0	0	3	0	0	0	1	4

Sheet E	1	2	3	4	5	6	7	8	Final
Germany (Schöpp)	1	0	2	0	0	0	0	X	3
Finland (Kauste)	0	1	0	1	1	3	1	X	7

=== Semifinals ===
Friday, October 5, 21:00

Sheet A	1	2	3	4	5	6	7	8	Final
Austria (Toth)	1	0	1	0	2	0	1	0	5
Scotland (MacDonald)	0	2	0	1	0	2	0	1	6

Sheet D	1	2	3	4	5	6	7	8	Final
Sweden (Hallström)	1	1	0	0	0	1	0	1	4
Finland (Kauste)	0	0	0	1	0	0	2	0	3

=== Bronze medal game ===
Saturday, October 6, 17:00

Sheet B	1	2	3	4	5	6	7	8	Final
Austria (Toth)	0	1	0	0	0	2	0	X	3
Finland (Kauste)	2	0	2	1	2	0	3	X	10

=== Gold medal game ===
Saturday, October 6, 17:00

Sheet C	1	2	3	4	5	6	7	8	Final
Scotland (MacDonald)	2	0	1	0	2	2	0	1	8
Sweden (Hallström)	0	2	0	2	0	0	0	0	4

2012 European Mixed Curling Championship
(Scotland)
Scotland
4th title
