= Rasmus Wranå =

Swedish curler (born 1994)

- Curler
- Born: 15 November 1994 (age 32); Stockholm, Sweden

Team
- Curling club: Karlstads CK, Karlstad, SWE
- Skip: Oskar Eriksson
- Third: Rasmus Wranå
- Second: Simon Olofsson
- Lead: Christoffer Sundgren
- Mixed doubles partner: Isabella Wranå

Curling career
- Member Association: Sweden
- World Championship: 9 (2017, 2018, 2019, 2021, 2022, 2023, 2024, 2025, 2026)
- World Mixed Doubles Championship: 2 (2022, 2024)
- European Championship: 10 (2016, 2017, 2018, 2019, 2021, 2022, 2023, 2024, 2025, 2026)
- Olympic: 3 (2018, 2022, 2026)
- Grand Slam victories: 4 (2016 Masters, 2016 Tour Challenge, 2017 Players', 2022 Tour Challenge)
Medal record
Men's curling
Representing Sweden
Olympic Games
Gold medal – first place	2022 Beijing	Team
Gold medal – first place	2026 Milano Cortina	Mixed doubles
Silver medal – second place	2018 Pyeongchang	Team
World Men's Championships
Gold medal – first place	2018 Las Vegas
Gold medal – first place	2019 Lethbridge
Gold medal – first place	2021 Calgary
Gold medal – first place	2022 Las Vegas
Gold medal – first place	2024 Schaffhausen
Gold medal – first place	2026 Ogden
Silver medal – second place	2017 Edmonton
World Mixed Doubles Championships
Gold medal – first place	2024 Östersund
European Championships
Gold medal – first place	2016 Renfrewshire
Gold medal – first place	2017 St Gallen
Gold medal – first place	2019 Helsingborg
Gold medal – first place	2025 Lohja
Silver medal – second place	2018 Tallinn
Silver medal – second place	2021 Lillehammer
Silver medal – second place	2023 Aberdeen
Bronze medal – third place	2026 Ostrava
World Junior Championships
Silver medal – second place	2012 Östersund
World Mixed Championship
Silver medal – second place	2015 Bern
Swedish Men's Championship
Gold medal – first place	2018
Gold medal – first place	2019
Gold medal – first place	2020
Gold medal – first place	2023
Bronze medal – third place	2016

Rasmus Bele Åke Wranå (born 15 November 1994) is a Swedish curler from Karlstad. He was the longtime second on Team Niklas Edin from 2016 to 2026. He now throws third stones on Team Oskar Eriksson. With the Swedish team, he won the gold medal in 2022 Olympics. He is also the 2026 Olympic mixed doubles champion with his sister Isabella Wranå. Along with Anders Kraupp, he is one of only two male curlers in Sweden to have won all three Swedish national championships in which he was eligible to compete in the senior division – men's team curling, mixed curling, and mixed doubles. He is the second curler to win both a World Men's Curling Championship and World Mixed Doubles Curling Championship titles in the same year, after his teammate Oskar Eriksson in 2019. In 2018 he was inducted into the Swedish Curling Hall of Fame.

== Career ==
=== Men's ===
During the 2016–17 curling season, Rasmus Wranå joined Team Niklas Edin as their new second, alongside Oskar Eriksson and Christoffer Sundgren. In their first season together, the team had one of its greatest seasons, winning three Grand Slam events, starting with the 2016 WFG Masters, a win that also made curling history as Team Edin became the first non-Canadian skip to win a men's Grand Slam event. Later that same season, Team Edin became the first non-Canadian team to win the Tour Challenge and the Player's Championship. As a result, Team Edin also became the only non-Canadian team currently to have won more than one Slam. His team also finished the season in first place on the Tour in terms of order-of-merit points and money won, becoming the first time a non-Canadian team won the Pinty's Cup. Team Edin also won the 2016 European Curling Championships – the second for the new Team Edin and the fifth for Edin and his teammate Eriksson. Team Edin also made the finals of the 2017 World Men's Curling Championship, winning a silver medal after falling short in the final to Team Canada (skipped by Brad Gushue).

In the 2017–18 curling season, Team Edin won the gold medal at the European Curling Championships, the silver medal for the men's team at 2018 Winter Olympics (losing to the United States team skipped by John Shuster), and then avenged their loss at the 2017 Worlds by defeating Team Gushue in the finals of the 2018 World Men's Curling Championship, Wranå's first World Men's title. The team also won the Baden Masters, Curling Masters Champery, and Perth Masters, and reached the finals of three Grand Slam of Curling events - the Masters, the Canadian Open, and the Players' Championship.

In the 2018–19 curling season, at the 2018 European Curling Championships, Team Edin went undefeated in the tournament until the final, where they lost to Scotland's rink skipped by Bruce Mouat. They again represented Sweden at the 2019 World Men's Curling Championship, winning the gold medal over Team Canada's Kevin Koe. Team Edin had a slow start to the 2019–20 season but also reached new milestones as the season progressed. After finishing as the runner-up at the Baden Masters, they then reached the bronze medal position at the Swiss Cup Basel, and made the playoffs at the 2019 Tour Challenge before losing to Team Brad Gushue in the quarters. In November 2019, however, Team Edin won a record seventh European Curling Curling Championship at the 2019 European Curling Championships. In December, the team also reached their tenth final at a Grand Slam of Curling event when they reached the final of the Boost National, losing to Team Brad Jacobs. The team finished the year in Japan at the Karuizawa International, coming in second to Team Matsumura. As the new year began, Team Edin, rejoined Team Europe and successfully defended their Continental Cup of Curling title, though they did not reach the playoffs at the 2020 Canadian Open. In February 2020, Team Edin won the Swedish Men's Curling Championships and thus cemented their right to compete for their third straight World Men's Championship title. Unfortunately, the 2020 World Men's Curling Championship was cancelled due to the global Coronavirus pandemic.

Team Edin began the 2020–21 season by winning the 2020 Baden Masters and reached the quarterfinals at the final World Curling Tour men's series 400 event in Europe in 2020, the Curling Masters Champéry. With team curling effectively shut down in Europe after October 2020, Team Edin did not return to competitive play until the 2021 World Men's Curling Championship. Despite the challenge of returning without a competitive national championship, the team finished at the top of the leaderboard and was ranked first in the playoffs, defeating Team Mouat of Scotland in the final and winning the third straight World Championship gold for the team - the first team to achieve this feat and to do so with the same four players. Edin and his teammates were also selected to compete in the 2022 Winter Olympics at the end of the season.

The 2021–22 season began with Team Edin reaching the playoffs in the first five tournaments they entered. In Switzerland, the team reached the semifinals of the Baden Masters, then the finals of the Swiss Cup Basel. The team then began the Canadian leg of their autumn schedule by winning the Penticton Curling Classic. The team also reached the quarterfinals in the Euro Super Series, as well as at the Masters and the National in the Grand Slam of Curling. At the 2021 European Curling Championships, the team won a silver medal. The team began 2022 with historic gold medals – their first Olympic gold and their fourth straight gold at the World Men's Curling Championship – the first team in history to win both Olympic and World Championship medals back-to-back in a single season. The team wrapped up the season by coming in second place in the finals of the 2022 Players' Championship and reaching the semifinals of the 2022 Champions Cup.

Shortly after the 2021–22 season closed, Team Edin formally announced that the same lineup planned to continue through the end of the next Olympic cycle, aiming to secure another medal in the 2026 Olympics in Cortina d'Ampezzo, Italy. The 2022–23 season thus became the seventh season for the team. The season started with Team Edin failing to make the playoffs in the Baden Masters, but then rallied to win the Oslo Cup and the Stu Sells Toronto Tankard. They then began the season's Grand Slam of Curling tour at the National, reaching the final. At the Tour Challenge(Tier 1), the team went undefeated on their way to winning the event, even though Edin was injured during the semifinal draw shot challenge and was sidelined through the final. Eriksson, Sundgren, and Wranå competed under the Edin banner for the team's next two events, winning the Western Showdown and reaching the semifinals of the Penticton Curling Classic. For the 2022 European Curling Championships, Team Eriksson competed for Sweden, with Daniel Magnusson moving to the second position, Wranå to third, and Eriksson as skip for the first time at a European Curling Championship. The team finished fourth, marking the first time since 2017 that Team Sweden did not reach the medal podium. Edin was back in the lineup to play in the 2023 Canadian Open played in January that season. The team found success with Edin back in the lineup, making it as far as the finals in the Canadian Open, before losing to Brendan Bottcher's rink. The team won the 2023 Swedish Curling Championship without Edin, but were re-united to play in the 2023 World Men's Curling Championship. The team went on to finish the 2023 Worlds with a 9–3 round robin record. They were eliminated by Canada in the qualification playoff game, ending their reign as World Champions for four years running. It also marked the first season in which Team Edin did not medal in either the European Curling Championship or World Curling Championship.

The 2023–24 season did not see the team win any tour events, but ended with Edin winning the 2024 World Men's Curling Championship, the fifth for Wranå. However, the team would fail to repeat at the 2025 World Men's Curling Championship, losing to eventual champions Scotland 8–7 in the quarterfinals, finishing 5th. Their finishes at the 2024 and 2025 World Championships however, directly qualified them to represent Sweden at the 2026 Winter Olympics.

=== Mixed doubles ===
Wranå participates in mixed doubles curling with his sister Isabella. They two won their first mixed doubles tour event at the 2020 Mixed Doubles Bern event. In 2022, the pair represented Sweden at the 2022 World Mixed Doubles Curling Championship in Geneva, Switzerland. After a 7–2 round robin record, they lost to Germany's Pia-Lisa Schöll and Klaudius Harsch in a qualification game, eliminating them in fifth place. Rasmus and Isabella also represented Sweden at the 2024 World Mixed Doubles Curling Championship as the hometown team, being held in Östersund. At the 2024 Championship, the team went 8–1 in the round robin, earning a bye to the semifinal. They then beat Switzerland's Briar Schwaller-Hürlimann and Yannick Schwaller before going on to defeat Estonia's Marie Kaldvee and Harri Lill 8–4 in the gold medal game. With this win, Rasmus was the first man to win both the Men's and Mixed doubles world championship in the same year. The following year, the pair was unable to defend their title as they lost in the final of the 2025 Swedish Mixed Doubles Championship to Anna Hasselborg and Oskar Eriksson. However, as Hasselborg and Eriksson missed the playoffs at the 2025 World Mixed Doubles Curling Championship, the Wranå siblings were selected to represent Sweden in mixed doubles at the 2026 Winter Olympics, marking Wranå's first Olympic appearance.

In preparation for their Olympic campaign, the Wranå's played in two tour events, reaching the quarterfinals at both the Uppsala Mixed Doubles and the Gothenburg Mixed Doubles Cup. At the Games, the siblings won their first two games over South Korea and Czechia, however, then suffered three consecutive losses to Estonia, Great Britain and Norway. They turned things around, however, with three wins in a row over Switzerland, Italy and Canada before closing out the round robin with a loss to the United States. Their 5–4 record was enough to earn them the fourth playoff seed. In the knockout round, they upset the top ranked British duo of Jennifer Dodds and Bruce Mouat in the semifinals to advance to the final against the United States' Cory Thiesse and Korey Dropkin. Down one in the last end, Isabella removed the American shot rock with her final stone to score two and win the Olympic gold medal, 6–5 the final score.

== Teams ==
=== Men's ===
Season	Skip	Third	Second	Lead	Alternate	Coach	Events
2011–12	Rasmus Wranå	Jordan Wåhlin	Daniel Lövstrand	Axel Sjöberg	Patric Mabergs (WJCC)		WJCC 2012 (silver)
2012–13	Rasmus Wranå	Jordan Wåhlin	Daniel Lövstrand	Axel Sjöberg			
2013–14	Rasmus Wranå	Jordan Wåhlin	Axel Sjöberg	Daniel Lövstrand	Mats Wranå		
2014–15	Rasmus Wranå	Jordan Wåhlin	Axel Sjöberg	Daniel Lövstrand	Max Brooks		
2015–16	Rasmus Wranå	Fredrik Nyman	Jordan Wåhlin	Joakim Flyg	Max Bäck		SMCC 2016 (bronze); SJCC 2016 (gold)
2015–16	Rasmus Wranå	Fredrik Nyman	Jordan Wåhlin	Max Bäck	Axel Sjöberg	Mats Wranå	WJCC 2016 (6th)
2016–17	Niklas Edin	Oskar Eriksson	Rasmus Wranå	Christoffer Sundgren	Henrik Leek		ECC 2016 (gold); CCC 2017 (silver); WCC 2017 (silver)
2017–18	Niklas Edin	Oskar Eriksson	Rasmus Wranå	Christoffer Sundgren	Henrik Leek (ECC, WOG, WCC)	Fredrik Lindberg	ECC 2017 (gold); WOG 2018 (silver); SMCC 2018 (gold); WCC 2018 (gold)
2018–19	Niklas Edin	Oskar Eriksson	Rasmus Wranå	Christoffer Sundgren	Daniel Magnusson (ECC, WCC)	Fredrik Lindberg	CWC/1 (5th); ECC 2018 (silver); CWC/2 (silver); SMCC 2019 (gold); CWC/3 (silver); WCC 2019 (gold); CWC/Final (4th)
2018–19	Fredrik Nyman	Rasmus Wranå	Axel Sjöberg	Max Bäck		Olle Brudsten	WUG 2019 (5th)
2019–20	Niklas Edin	Oskar Eriksson	Rasmus Wranå	Christoffer Sundgren	Daniel Magnusson		ECC 2019 (gold); SMCC 2020 (gold)
2020–21	Niklas Edin	Oskar Eriksson	Rasmus Wranå	Christoffer Sundgren	Daniel Magnusson		WCC 2021 (gold)
2021–22	Niklas Edin	Oskar Eriksson	Rasmus Wranå	Christoffer Sundgren	Daniel Magnusson		ECC 2021 (silver); WOG 2022 (gold); WCC 2022 (gold)
2022–23	Niklas Edin	Oskar Eriksson	Rasmus Wranå	Christoffer Sundgren	Daniel Magnusson		ECC 2022 (4th); SMCC 2023 (gold); WCC 2023 (5th)
2023–24	Niklas Edin	Oskar Eriksson	Rasmus Wranå	Christoffer Sundgren	Daniel Magnusson		ECC 2023 (silver); WCC 2024 (gold)
2024–25	Niklas Edin	Oskar Eriksson	Rasmus Wranå	Christoffer Sundgren	Daniel Magnusson (ECC); Simon Olofsson (WCC)		ECC 2024 (5th); WCC 2025 (5th)
2025–26	Niklas Edin	Oskar Eriksson	Rasmus Wranå	Christoffer Sundgren	Simon Olofsson		ECC 2025 (gold); WOG 2026 (9th); WCC 2026
2026–27	Oskar Eriksson	Rasmus Wranå	Simon Olofsson	Christoffer Sundgren			

=== Mixed ===
Season	Skip	Third	Second	Lead	Coach	Events
2011–12	Rasmus Wranå	Amalia Rudström	Jordan Wåhlin	Johanna Heldin		WYOG 2012 (4th)
2013–14	Rasmus Wranå	Amalia Rudström	Joakim Flyg	Johanna Heldin		SMxCC 2014 (bronze)
2014–15	Rasmus Wranå	Zandra Flyg	Joakim Flyg	Johanna Heldin	Mats Wranå (WMxCC)	SMxCC 2015 (gold); WMxCC 2015 (silver)
2015–16	Rasmus Wranå	Jennie Wåhlin	Joakim Flyg	Johanna Heldin		SMxCC 2016 (gold)

=== Mixed doubles ===
Season	Female	Male	Events
2011–12	Kerli Zirk	Rasmus Wranå	WYOG 2012 (9th)
2012–13	Johanna Heldin	Rasmus Wranå	SMDCC 2013 (bronze)
2015–16	Isabella Wranå	Rasmus Wranå	SMDCC 2016 (bronze)
2016–17	Karin Rudström	Rasmus Wranå	SMDCC 2017 (5th)
2019–20	Agnes Knochenhauer	Rasmus Wranå	SMDCC 2020 (gold)
2021–22	Isabella Wranå	Rasmus Wranå	WMDCC 2022 (5th)
2023–24	Isabella Wranå	Rasmus Wranå	WMDCC 2024 (gold)
2024–25	Isabella Wranå	Rasmus Wranå	SMDWQ 2025 (silver)
2025–26	Isabella Wranå	Rasmus Wranå	WOG 2026 (gold)

== Grand Slam record ==
Key
C	Champion
F	Lost in Final
SF	Lost in Semifinal
QF	Lost in Quarterfinals
R16	Lost in the round of 16
Q	Did not advance to playoffs
T2	Played in Tier 2 event
DNP	Did not participate in event
N/A	Not a Grand Slam event that season

Event	2016–17	2017–18	2018–19	2019–20	2020–21	2021–22	2022–23	2023–24	2024–25	2025–26	2026–27
Invitational	C	SF	Q	QF	N/A	N/A	C	QF	Q	QF	Q
Masters	C	F	SF	Q	N/A	QF	QF	Q	QF	Q	DNP
National	SF	DNP	QF	F	N/A	QF	F	F	Q	Q	SF
Open	F	F	SF	Q	N/A	N/A	F	Q	QF	Q	
Players'	C	F	QF	N/A	QF	F	QF	QF	DNP	Q	
Champions Cup	SF	Q	SF	N/A	QF	SF	SF	N/A	N/A	N/A	N/A
Elite 10	Q	Q	Q	N/A	N/A	N/A	N/A	N/A	N/A	N/A	N/A

== Personal life ==
His father is Mats Wranå, Swedish curler and coach. His sister is Swedish curler Isabella Wranå, Rasmus' mixed doubles partner.
