= Zandra, Pakistan =

Pakistani town

Zandra Zranda
- Town and union council
- Country: Pakistan
- Region: Balochistan
- District: Ziarat District

Population (2017)
  - Total: 7,897
- Time zone: UTC+5 (PST)

Zandra is a town and union council of Ziarat District in the Balochistan province of Pakistan. Zandra had a population of 7,897 in the 2017 census. It is known in Pakistan for its cherry orchards.
