= Zandra Pettersson =

Swedish politician (born 1968)

Zandra Pettersson SD

Member of the Riksdag
- Incumbent
- Assumed office 2018
- Constituency: Västra Götaland County

Personal details
- Born: 18 November 1968 (age 57) Sweden
- Party: Sweden Democrats

Zandra Margareta Pettersson (born 18 November 1968) is a Swedish politician and former singer who a member of the Member of the Riksdag for the Sweden Democrats party.

Before entering politics, Pettersson was a pop singer with the Swedish girl group Popsie from 1992 until 1998. During the 2018 Swedish general election she stood for the Sweden Democrats in the constituency of Västra Götaland County and was elected to the Riksdag. She had previously been a substitute for the Dalarna County constituency.

During the 2019 European Parliament election, she stood on the SD list as number 11 but was not elected. Since 2019 she has also been a member of the SD's executive board.
