= Mats Wranå =

Swedish male curler and coach

- Curler ♂
- Born: 22 January 1965 (age 61)

Team
- Curling club: Sundbybergs CK, Sundbyberg

Curling career
- Member Association: Sweden
- European Championship: 1 (1995)
- World Senior Curling Championship: 5 (2016, 2017, 2018, 2022, 2024)
Medal record
Curling
World Senior Championships
Gold medal – first place	2016 Karlstad
Gold medal – first place	2017 Lethbridge
Silver medal – second place	2018 Östersund
Bronze medal – third place	2022 Geneva
Bronze medal – third place	2024 Östersund
Swedish Men's Championship
Gold medal – first place	1995

Mats Patrik Josef Wranå (born 22 January 1965) is a Swedish curler and curling coach.

At the international level, he is a two-time World senior champion curler (2016, 2017).

At the national level, he is a 1995 Swedish men's champion curler.

In 2017 he was inducted into the Swedish Curling Hall of Fame.

== Teams ==
=== Men ===
Season	Skip	Third	Second	Lead	Alternate	Coach	Events
1994–95	Mats Wranå	Peter Larsson	Thomas Winge	Rickard Holmlund	Anders Nyström		SMCC 1995 (gold)
1995–96	Mats Wranå	Peter Larsson	Thomas Winge	Rickard Holmlund	Anders Nyström		ECC 1995 (7th)
2008–09	Mats Wranå	Fredrik Julius	Johan Bergman	Gerry Wahlin	Martin Vallée		
2011–12	Mats Wranå	Fredrik Julius	Martin Vallée	Johan Bergman	Gerry Wahlin		
2012–13	Mats Wranå (fourth)	Fredrik Julius (skip)	Gerry Wahlin	Martin Vallée			
2012–13	Rasmus Wranå	Jordan Wåhlin	Axel Sjöberg	Daniel Lövstrand	Mats Wranå, Gerry Wåhlin		SMCC 2013 (7th)
2015–16	Mats Wranå (fourth)	Fredrik Julius (skip)	Johan Bergman	Martin Vallée			
2015–16	Mats Wranå	Mikael Hasselborg	Anders Eriksson	Gerry Wahlin	Lars Lindgren		WSCC 2016 (gold)
2016–17	Mats Wranå	Mikael Hasselborg	Anders Eriksson	Gerry Wahlin			WSCC 2017 (gold)
2017–18	Mats Wranå	Mikael Hasselborg	Anders Eriksson	Gerry Wahlin	Mikael Ljungberg	Mikael Ljungberg	WSCC 2018 (silver)
2019–20	Mats Wranå	Gerry Wahlin	Mikael Hasselborg	Mattias Hasselborg	Anton Sandström		SMCC (12th)
2021–22	Mats Wranå	Mikael Hasselborg	Anders Eriksson	Gerry Wahlin	Per Noréen	Jordan Wåhlin	WSCC 2022 (bronze)

=== Mixed ===
Season	Skip	Third	Second	Lead	Events
2013–14	Mats Wranå	Monika Wranå	Gerry Wåhlin	Jill Harrison	SMxCC 2014 (5th)
2014–15	Per Carlsén	Gunilla Palmcrantz	Mats Wranå	Monika Wranå	SMxCC 2015 (5th)
2018–19	Mats Wranå	Susanne Patz	Flemming Patz	Monika Wranå	SMxCC 2019 (9th)

=== Mixed doubles ===
Season	Female	Male	Events
2011–12	Monika Wranå	Mats Wranå	SMDCC 2012 (silver)
2013–14	Monika Wranå	Mats Wranå	SMDCC 2014 (13th)
2018–19	Monika Wranå	Mats Wranå	SMDCC 2019 (9th)
2019–20	Monika Wranå	Mats Wranå	SMDCC 2020 (bronze)

== Record as a coach of national teams ==
Year	Tournament, event	National team	Place
2012	2012 World Junior Curling Championships	Sweden (junior men)	2nd place, silver medalist(s)
2014	2014 European Mixed Curling Championship	Sweden (mixed)	1st place, gold medalist(s)
2015	2015 World Mixed Curling Championship	Sweden (mixed)	2nd place, silver medalist(s)
2016	2016 World Junior Curling Championships	Sweden (junior men)	6

== Personal life ==
Mats Wranå is from a well-known Swedish curling family: his son Rasmus Wranå is a World, European and Swedish champion, member of Niklas Edin's team; his daughter Isabella Wranå is a World Universiade', European Mixed and Swedish champion; his wife Monika is also a curler, Mats's mixed doubles partner.
