= Fredrik Hallström =

Swedish curler

Medal record

Curling

Representing Sweden

World Mixed Doubles Championship
Silver medal – second place	2013 Fredericton	Mixed doubles

European Mixed Championship
Silver medal – second place	2012 Erzurum	Mixed team

European Championships
Bronze medal – third place	2006 Basel	Men's A Group

Fredrik Hallström (born 7 May 1966) is a Swedish curler.

Hallström started playing curling in 1975. He plays in first position and is right-handed.

In 2008 he was inducted into the Swedish Curling Hall of Fame.
