= Rickard Hallström =

Swedish curler and coach

- Curler ♂
- Born: 4 January 1973 (age 53)

Team
- Curling club: Östersunds CK, Östersund, Sundsvalls CK, Sundsvall

Curling career
- Member Association: Sweden
- World Championship: 1 (2003)
- European Championship: 1 (2006)
- Other appearances: World Mixed Championship: 1 (2018), European Mixed Championship: 1 (2012), World Junior Championships: 1 (1993)
Medal record
Curling
European Mixed Championship
Silver medal – second place	2012 Erzurum	Mixed team
European Championships
Bronze medal – third place	2006 Basel	Men's A Group
Coach for Sweden
World Junior Championships
Silver medal – second place	2005 Pinerolo	Men's Coach
Gold medal – first place	2004 Trois-Rivières	Men's Coach

Olof Peter Rickard Hallström (born 4 January 1973) is a Swedish curler and curling coach.

Hallström started playing curling in 1980. He plays in second position and is right-handed.

In 2008 he was inducted into the Swedish Curling Hall of Fame.
