= Swedish Women's Curling Championship =

National curling championship

The Swedish Women's Curling Championship (Swedish: Svenska mästerskap i curling för damer, SM lag damer) is the national championship of women's curling in Sweden. It has been held annually since 1962.

== List of champions ==
Year	Champion team (City, curling club)	Skip	Third	Second	Lead
1962	Stockholm, CK Sessan	Ulla Ödlund	Liss-Anna Sande	Karin Ekström	Margareta Hansson
1963	Stockholm, CK Dockan	Ewa Öhrman	Maj-Britt Eklund	Marianne Lundquist	Anna-Stina Forsström
1964	Stockholm, CK Dockan	Gun Stjernberg	Birgit Gyllenberg	Gerd Kastengren	Birgitta Winquist
1965	Sollefteå, Sollefteå CK	Gertrud Kamp	Gun Olsson	Christina Jeanson	Britta Lundahl
1966	Örebro, Örebro CK	Sonja Wikström	Margareta Röhnisch	Märta Kullendorf	Gunvor Rydman
1967	Stockholm, CK Pinglan	Marianne Källén	Elisabeth Klärre	Greta Perning	Maiken Algård
1968	Stockholm, CK Pinglan	Marianne Källén	Elisabeth Klärre	Greta Perning	Maiken Algård
1969	Karlstad, Karlstads CK	Elisabeth Carlsson	Margareta Carlsson	Marie Lindquist	Marie Sahlström
1970	Sundsvall, Sundsvalls CK	Goldis Berggren	Barbro Berggren	Birgitta Jarehov	Maud Nordlander
1971	Sollefteå, Sollefteå CK	Gertrud Kamp	Gun Olsson	Christina Jeanson	Iris Nilsson
1972	Karlstad, Karlstads CK	Elisabeth Carlsson	Margareta Carlsson-Eriksson	Kerstin Järund	Sonja Ekenberg
1973	Sundsvall, Sundsvalls CK	Gunvor Hamberg	Maud Nordlander	Ewa Hallberg	Birgitta Eriksson
1974	Karlstad, Karlstads CK	Elisabeth Carlsson	Marie Lindquist	Kerstin Järund	Sonja Ekenberg
1975	Örebro, Örebro DCK	Elisabeth Branäs	Britt-Marie Lundin	Anne-Marie Ericsson	Eva Rosenhed
1976	Örebro, Örebro DCK	Elisabeth Branäs	Eva Rosenhed	Anne-Marie Ericsson	Britt-Marie Lundin
1977	Örebro, Örebro DCK	Elisabeth Branäs	Eva Rosenhed	Anne-Marie Ericsson	Siv Persson
1978	Norrköping, Norrköpings CK	Inga Arfwidsson	Barbro Arfwidsson	Ingrid Appelquist	Gunvor Björhäll
1979	Stockholm, Amatörföreningens CK	Birgitta Törn	Katarina Hultling	Susanne Gynning-Ödlund	Gunilla Bergman
1980	Karlstad, Karlstads CK	Elisabeth Carlsson-Högström	Carina Olsson	Birgitta Sewik	Karin Sjögren
1981	Karlstad, Karlstads CK	Elisabeth Högström	Carina Olsson	Birgitta Sewik	Karin Sjögren
1982	Karlstad, Karlstads CK	Elisabeth Högström	Katarina Hultling	Birgitta Sewik	Karin Sjögren
1983	Falun, Falu CC	Anneli Burman	Brita Lindholm	Katarina Lässker	Mait Bjurström
1984	Danderyd, Stocksunds CK	Ingrid Thidevall-Meldahl	Ann-Catrin Kjerr	Sylvia Malmberg	Astrid Blomberg
1985	Norrköping, Norrköpings CK	Inga Arfwidsson	Maud Nordlander	Ulrika Åkerberg	Barbro Arfwidsson
1986	Karlstad, Karlstads CK	Elisabeth Högström	Birgitta Sewik	Eva Andersson	Bitte Berg
1987	Härnösand, Härnösands CK	Anette Norberg	Anna Rindeskog	Sofie Marmont	Louise Marmont
1988	Karlstad, Karlstads CK	Elisabeth Högström	Monika Jansson	Birgitta Sewik	Marie Henriksson
1989	Härnösand, Härnösands CK	Anette Norberg	Anna Rindeskog	Sofie Marmont	Louise Marmont
1990	Östersund, Frösö-Oden CK	Lotta Giesenfeld	Heléna Svensson	Elisabeth Hansson	Lena Mårdberg
1991	Härnösand, Härnösands CK	Anette Norberg	Cathrine Norberg	Anna Rindeskog	Helene Granqvist
1992	Umeå, Umeå CK	Elisabet Johansson	Katarina Nyberg	Louise Marmont	Elisabeth Persson
1993	Umeå, Umeå CK	Elisabet Johansson	Katarina Nyberg	Louise Marmont	Elisabeth Persson
1994	Härnösand, Härnösands CK	Anette Norberg	Cathrine Norberg	Helena Klange	Helene Granqvist
1995	Umeå, Umeå CK	Elisabet Gustafson	Katarina Nyberg	Louise Marmont	Elisabeth Persson
1996	Umeå, Umeå CK	Elisabet Gustafson	Katarina Nyberg	Louise Marmont	Elisabeth Persson
1997	Umeå, Umeå CK	Elisabet Gustafson	Katarina Nyberg	Louise Marmont	Elisabeth Persson
1998	Härnösand, Härnösands CK	Anette Norberg	Cathrine Norberg	Heléna Svensson	Anna Blom
1999	Sveg, Svegs CK	Margaretha Lindahl	Ulrika Bergman	Anna Bergström	Mia Zackrisson
2000	Umeå, Umeå CK	Elisabet Gustafson	Katarina Nyberg	Louise Marmont	Elisabeth Persson
2001	Härnösand, Härnösands CK	Anette Norberg	Cathrine Norberg	Eva Lund	Helena Lingham
2002	Umeå, Umeå CK	Elisabet Gustafson	Katarina Nyberg	Louise Marmont	Elisabeth Persson
2003	Härnösand, Härnösands CK	Anette Norberg	Cathrine Norberg	Eva Lund	Heléna Lingham
2004	Härnösand, Härnösands CK	Anette Norberg	Eva Lund	Cathrine Norberg	Anna Bergström
2005	Härnösand, Härnösands CK	Anette Norberg	Eva Lund	Cathrine Lindahl	Anna Bergström
2006	Gävle, CK Granit-Gävle	Camilla Johansson	Katarina Nyberg	Mio Hasselborg	Elisabeth Persson
2007	Härnösand, Härnösands CK	Anette Norberg	Eva Lund	Cathrine Lindahl	Anna Svärd

(below teams line-up in order: fourth, third, second, lead, alternate, coach; skips marked bold)

Year	Champion	Runner-up	Bronze
2008	Härnösands CK (Härnösand); Anette Norberg, Eva Lund, Cathrine Lindahl, Anna Svärd	Skellefteå CK Team AllTele (Skellefteå); Stina Viktorsson, Maria Prytz, Maria Wennerström, Margaretha Sigfridsson	Sundbybergs CK Team Bishop's Arms (Sundbyberg); Anna Hasselborg, Sabina Kraupp, Agnes Knochenhauer, Zandra Flyg, alternate: Sigrid Kamp, coach: Mikael Hasselborg
2009	Skellefteå CK Team AllTele (Skellefteå); Stina Viktorsson, Christina Bertrup, Maria Wennerström, Margaretha Sigfridsson	Sveg/Fjällbrynt (Sveg); Kajsa Bergström, Lisa Löfskog-Södergren, Jenny Hammarström, Anki Nordqvist	Härnösand/Folksam (Härnösand); Anette Norberg, Eva Lund, Cathrine Lindahl, Anna Svärd, coach: Stefan Lund
2010	Skellefteå CK Team Alltele (Skellefteå); Stina Viktorsson, Christina Bertrup, Maria Wennerström, Margaretha Sigfridsson	Fyris Uppsala / Team Lofsdalen (Uppsala); Karin Rudström, Emma Berg, Rosalie Egli, Elina Backman, Malin Ekholm, coach: P O Egli	Karlstads CK Team HG Storm (Karlstad); Cissi Östlund, Sara Carlsson, Anna Domeij, Lotta Lennartsson
2011	Sundbybergs CK Hasselborg (Sundbyberg); Anna Hasselborg, Sabina Kraupp, Agnes Knochenhauer, Zandra Flyg, Mikael Hasselborg	Granit-Gävle/EGA (Gävle); Jonna McManus, Sara McManus, Anna Huhta, Sofia Mabergs, coach: Stuart McManus	Karlstads CK/Ahlmarks (Karlstad); Anette Norberg, Cissi Östlund, Sara Carlsson, Lotta Lennartsson, coach: Magnus Swartling
2012	Skellefteå CK Sigfridsson (Skellefteå); Maria Prytz, Christina Bertrup, Maria Wennerström, Margaretha Sigfridsson, coach: Fredrik Hallström	Karlstads CK Team Ahlmarks (Karlstad); Anette Norberg, Cecilia Östlund, Sara Carlsson, Lotta Lennartsson, coach: Örjan Erixon	CK Granit-Gävle Team Ega (Gävle); Jonna McManus, Sara McManus, Anna Huhta, Sofia Mabergs, coach: Stuart McManus
2013	Skellefteå CK Sigfridsson (Skellefteå); Maria Prytz, Christina Bertrup, Maria Wennerström, Margaretha Sigfridsson	Karlstads CK Team Ahlmarks (Karlstad); Anette Norberg, Cecilia Östlund, Sabina Kraupp, Sara Carlsson	Sundbybergs CK Hasselborg (Sundbyberg); Anna Hasselborg, Karin Rudström, Agnes Knochenhauer, Zandra Flyg, coach: Mikael Hasselborg
2014	Sundbybergs CK Hasselborg (Sundbyberg); Anna Hasselborg, Karin Rudström, Agnes Knochenhauer, Zandra Flyg, coach: Mikael Hasselborg	IK Fyris Team Donald Davies & Partners; Towe Lundman, Amalia Rudström, Anna Gustafsson, Elina Backman, alternate: Johanna Heldin, coach: Håkan Rudström	CK Granit-Gävle Team Celebra (Gävle); Sofia Mabergs, Anna Huhta, Jonna McManus, Sara McManus, coach: Stuart McManus
2015	Karlstads CK Östlund (Karlstad); Cecilia Östlund, Sabina Kraupp, Sara Carlsson, Paulina Stein	IK Fyris Team Donald Davies & Partners (Uppsala); Towe Lundman, Anna Gustafsson, Elina Backman, Johanna Heldin, coach: Mattias Åkerberg, coach: Nils-Erik Heldin	Skellefteå CK Team AllTele (Skellefteå); Maria Prytz, Christina Bertrup, Maria Wennerström, Margaretha Sigfridsson, alternate: Camilla Johansson, coach: Fredrik Hallström
2016	Karlstads CK Östlund (Karlstad); Cecilia Östlund, Sabina Kraupp, Sara Carlsson, Paulina Stein	Sundbybergs CK Team Panthera (Sundbyberg); Isabella Wranå, Jennie Wåhlin, Johanna Höglund, Fanny Sjöberg, coach: Gerry Wåhlin	Sundbybergs CK Team ÅF (Sundbyberg); Anna Hasselborg, Sara McManus, Agnes Knochenhauer, Sofia Mabergs, coach: Mathias Mabergs
2017	Skellefteå CK Sigfridsson (Skellefteå); Cissi Östlund, Christina Bertrup, Maria Wennerström, Margaretha Sigfridsson	Sundbybergs CK Hasselborg (Sundbyberg); Anna Hasselborg, Sara McManus, Agnes Knochenhauer, Sofia Mabergs	Östersund CK Team Woolpower (Östersund); Tova Sundberg, Emma Sjödin, Sandra Ljungberg, Sofie Bergman
2018	Sundbybergs CK Team Panthera (Sundbyberg); Isabella Wranå, Jennie Wåhlin, Almida de Val, Fanny Sjöberg, coach: Margaretha Sigfridsson	IK Fyris Team Donald Davies (Uppsala); Anette Norberg, Therese Westman, Johanna Heldin, Tilde Vermelin, alternate: Sarah Pengel	Östersund CK Team Woolpower (Östersund); Tova Sundberg, Emma Sjödin, Maria Larsson, Sofie Bergman, coach: Rickard Hallström
2019	Sundbybergs CK Team Hasselborg (Sundbyberg); Anna Hasselborg, Sara McManus, Agnes Knochenhauer, Sofia Mabergs, alternate: Tilda Knochenhauer	Sundbybergs CK Team Panthera (Sundbyberg); Isabella Wranå, Jennie Wåhlin, Almida de Val, Fanny Sjöberg, coach: Margaretha Sigfridsson	IK Fyris Team Donald Davies & Partners (Uppsala); Anette Norberg, Therese Westman, Johanna Heldin, Tilde Vermelin
2020	Sundbybergs CK (Sundbyberg); Anna Hasselborg, Sara McManus, Agnes Knochenhauer, Sofia Mabergs	Östersund CK (Östersund); Tova Sundberg, Johanna Heldin, Emma Sjödin, Anna Gustafsson	Sundbybergs CK (Sundbyberg); Isabella Wranå, Jennie Wåhlin, Almida de Val, Fanny Sjöberg
2021	Cancelled due to the COVID-19 pandemic in Sweden		
2022	Sundbybergs CK (Sundbyberg); Isabella Wranå, Almida de Val, Jennie Wåhlin, Maria Larsson	Östersund CK (Östersund); Tova Sundberg, Emma Sjödin, Linnéa Svedberg, Sofie Bergman	Mjölby AI (Mjölby); Emma Moberg, Rebecka Thunman, Emma Landelius, Mikaela Altebro
2023	Sundbybergs CK (Sundbyberg); Anna Hasselborg, Agnes Knochenhauer, Sofia Mabergs, Johanna Heldin	Sundbybergs CK (Sundbyberg); Isabella Wranå, Almida de Val, Linda Stenlund, Maria Larsson	Sundbybergs CK (Sundbyberg); Moa Dryburgh, Thea Orefjord, Moa Tjärnlund, Moa Nilsson
2024	Sundbybergs CK (Sundbyberg); Anna Hasselborg, Sara McManus, Agnes Knochenhauer, Sofia Mabergs	Sundbybergs CK (Sundbyberg); Isabella Wranå, Almida de Val, Linda Stenlund, Maria Larsson	Mjölby AI (Mjölby); Emma Moberg, Rebecka Thunman, Emma Landelius, Mikaela Altebro
2025	Mjölby AI (Mjölby); Emma Moberg, Rebecka Thunman, Emma Landelius, Mikaela Altebro	Härnösands CK (Härnösand); Anette Norberg, Maria Prytz, Anna Gustafsson, Karin Sundquist	Härnösands CK (Härnösand); Johanna Heldin, Molly Mabergs, Thea Sundgren, Marta Claesson; Sundbybergs CK (Sundbyberg); Erika Ryberg, Astrid Linder, Hilda Holmberg, Matilda Wigg Lindberg
2026	Härnösands CK (Härnösand); Molly Mabergs, Tova Noreen, Emelie Sarén, Märta Claesson	Sundbybergs CK (Sundbyberg); Erika Ryberg, Astrid Linder, Hilda Holmberg, Matilda Lindberg	Härnösands CK (Härnösand); Nilla Hallström, Thea Sundgren, Cecilia Fransson, Linnéa Nilsson

== See also ==
- Swedish Men's Curling Championship
- Swedish Mixed Curling Championship
- Swedish Mixed Doubles Curling Championship
- Swedish Junior Curling Championships
- Swedish Senior Curling Championships
- Swedish Wheelchair Curling Championship
