= Helena Klange =

Swedish curler

- Curler ♀
- Born: 20 January 1968 (age 58); Vallentuna

Team
- Curling club: Stocksunds CK, Stockholm, Härnösands CK, Härnösand

Curling career
- Member Association: Sweden
- World Championship: 1 (1988)
- European Championship: 1 (1994)
- Other appearances: World Junior Championships: 1 (1989), World Senior Championships: 1 (2019)
Medal record
Curling
World Championships
Bronze medal – third place	1988 Glasgow
Swedish Women's Championship
Gold medal – first place	1994

Helena Angelica Gunnarsdotter Klange (born 20 January 1968 in Vallentuna) is a Swedish curler.

At the international level, she was a bronze medallist at the 1988 World Women's Curling Championship.

At the national level, she is a Swedish women's champion curler (1994) and two-time Swedish mixed champion curler (1986, 1996).

In 1996 she was inducted into the Swedish Curling Hall of Fame.

== Teams ==
=== Women's ===
Season	Skip	Third	Second	Lead	Alternate	Coach	Events
1987–88	Anette Norberg	Anna Rindeskog	Sofie Marmont	Louise Marmont	Helena Klange		WCC 1988 (bronze)
1988–89	Anette Norberg	Mari Högqvist	Helene Granqvist	Annica Eklund	Helena Klange		WJCC 1989 (4th)
1993–94	Anette Norberg	Cathrine Norberg	Helena Klange	Helene Granqvist			SWCC 1994 (gold)
1994–95	Anette Norberg	Cathrine Norberg	Helena Klange	Helene Granqvist	Elisabeth Hansson	Åke Norberg	ECC 1994 (5th)
2018–19	Anette Norberg	Helena Klange	Helena Lingham	Anna Klange-Wikström			WSCC 2019 (5th)

=== Mixed ===
Season	Skip	Third	Second	Lead	Events	
1985–86	Per Axelsson	Anna Klange	Henrik Holmberg	Helena Klange		SMxCC 1986 (gold)
1995–96	Helena Klange	Mikael Vilénius	Anna Klange	Kaj Möller		SMxCC 1996 (gold)
