= Helena Lingham =

Swedish curler

- Curler ♀
- Born: Helena Svensson; 22 September 1963 (age 63)

Team
- Curling club: Falu CC, Falun, Frösö-Oden CK, Stockholm, Härnösands CK, Härnösand

Curling career
- Member Association: Sweden
- World Championship: 6 (1990, 1994, 1995, 1997, 2001, 2003)
- European Championship: 3 (1990, 1998, 2002)
- Other appearances: World Senior Curling Championships: 2 (2018, 2019)
Medal record
Curling
World Championships
Gold medal – first place	1995 Brandon
Silver medal – second place	2001 Lausanne
Bronze medal – third place	1994 Oberstdorf
Bronze medal – third place	2003 Winnipeg
European Championships
Gold medal – first place	2002 Grindelward
Swedish Women's Championship
Gold medal – first place	1990
Gold medal – first place	1998
Gold medal – first place	2001
Gold medal – first place	2003
Bronze medal – third place	1999

Helena Lingham (born 22 September 1963 as Helena Svensson) is a Swedish female curler.

She is a 1995 world champion and 2002 European champion. In 1998 she was inducted into the Swedish Curling Hall of Fame.

She was elected to the World Curling Board, as Director in September 2022.

In 1995 she was elected to the Swedish Curling Association Board and served on the Board for 16 years. She was a representative of the Swedish Curling Association to World Curling for 12 years. During the Nagano Winter Olympics in 1998 she served as Chef de Mission of the Swedish Curling delegation.

She also served on the Board Nomination Committee at the Swedish Olympic Committee for 10 years, first as a member (2005–2009), then as Chair (2009–2015). Between 2014 and 2022 she served as Board and Executive Committee Member at Täby Sim.

== Teams ==
=== Women's ===
Season	Skip	Third	Second	Lead	Alternate	Coach	Events
1983–84	Katarina Hjorth	Helena Svensson	Karin Berggren	Anna Eggertz			SJCC 1984 (gold); EJCC 1984 (gold)
1989–90	Helena Svensson (fourth)	Lotta Giesenfeld (skip)	Elisabeth Hansson	Annika Lööf	Lena Mårdberg		SWCC 1990 (gold); WCC 1990 (6th)
1990–91	Annika Lööf	Lotta Giesenfeld	Helena Svensson	Elisabeth Hansson	Lena Mårdberg		ECC 1990 (6th)
1993–94	Elisabet Johansson	Katarina Nyberg	Louise Marmont	Elisabeth Persson	Helena Svensson		WCC 1994 (bronze)
1994–95	Elisabet Gustafson	Katarina Nyberg	Louise Marmont	Elisabeth Persson	Helena Svensson		WCC 1995 (gold)
1996–97	Cathrine Norberg	Helena Svensson	Anna Blom	Annika Lööf	Margaretha Lindahl		WCC 1997 (5th)
1997–98	Anette Norberg	Cathrine Norberg	Helena Svensson	Anna Blom			SWCC 1998 (gold)
1998–99	Anette Norberg	Cathrine Norberg	Helena Lingham	Anna Blom			SWCC 1999 (bronze)
2000–01	Anette Norberg	Cathrine Norberg	Eva Lund	Helena Lingham	Maria Engholm	Stefan Lund	SWCC 2001 (gold); WCC 2001 (silver)
2002–03	Anette Norberg	Cathrine Norberg	Eva Lund	Helena Lingham	Maria Hasselborg	Stefan Lund	ECC 2002 (gold)
2017–18	Anette Norberg	Helena Lingham	Anna Klange	Anna Rindeskog	Susanne Patz	Therese Westman	WSCC 2018 (4th)
2018–19	Anette Norberg	Helena Klange	Helena Lingham	Anna Klange			WSCC 2019 (5th)

=== Mixed ===
Season	Skip	Third	Second	Lead	Events
1982–83	Per Hedén	Katarina Hjorth	Håkan Nilsson	Helena Svensson	SMxCC 1983 (gold)
