= Annika Lööf =

Swedish curler

- Curler ♀
- Born: 11 September 1966 (age 60)

Team
- Curling club: Frösö-Oden CK, Stockholm, Härnösands CK, Härnösand

Curling career
- Member Association: Sweden
- World Championship: 4 (1990, 1992, 1993, 1997)
- European Championship: 1 (1990)
- Other appearances: World Junior Championships: 1 (1988)
Medal record
Curling
World Championships
Gold medal – first place	1992 Garmisch-Partenkirchen
Bronze medal – third place	1993 Geneva
Swedish Women's Championship
Gold medal – first place	1990

Annika Lööf (born 11 September 1966) is a Swedish female curler.

She is a 1992 world champion and 1993 world bronze medallist.

== Teams ==
Season	Skip	Third	Second	Lead	Alternate	Events
1987–88	Elisabeth Hansson (fourth)	Annika Lööf (skip)	Catharina Eklund	Malin Lundberg		SJCC 1988 (gold); WJCC 1988 (6th)
1989–90	Helena Svensson (fourth)	Lotta Giesenfeld (skip)	Elisabeth Hansson	Annika Lööf	Lena Mårdberg	SWCC 1990 (gold); WCC 1990 (6th)
1990–91	Annika Lööf	Lotta Giesenfeld	Helena Svensson	Elisabeth Hansson	Lena Mårdberg	ECC 1990 (6th)
1991–92	Elisabet Johansson	Katarina Nyberg	Louise Marmont	Elisabeth Persson	Annika Lööf	WCC 1992 (gold)
1992–93	Elisabet Johansson	Katarina Nyberg	Louise Marmont	Elisabeth Persson	Annika Lööf	WCC 1993 (bronze)
1996–97	Cathrine Norberg	Helena Svensson	Anna Blom	Annika Lööf	Margaretha Lindahl	WCC 1997 (5th)

== Private life ==
Her brother Anders is a curler too. He played for Sweden at the 1989 and 1994 World men's championships.
