= Swedish Junior Curling Championships =

The Swedish Junior Curling Championships (Swedish: Svenska mästerskap i curling för juniorer, Junior SM, JSM) is an annual curling tournament held to determine the best junior-level men's and women's curling teams in Sweden. Junior level curlers must be under the age of 21 as of 30 June in the year prior to the tournament. It has been held annually since the 1966-1967 season for junior men and the 1972-1973 season for junior women; the championship events are organized by the Swedish Curling Association (Swedish: Svenska Curlingförbundet).

== Champions ==
=== Men ===
Year	Champion team (City, curling club)	Skip	Third	Second	Lead	Alternate	Coach
1967	Karlstads CK (Karlstad)	Klas Nerman	Olle Nerman	Jan Owe-Larsson	Gunnar Åberg		
1968	Karlstads CK (Karlstad)	Klas Nerman	Olle Nerman	Jan Owe-Larsson	Gunnar Åberg		
1969	Norrköpings CK (Norrköping)	Fredrik Lundberg	Jerker Olsson	Göran Eriksson	Stefan Haraldsson		
1970	Amatörföreningens CK (Stockholm)	Fredrik Lundberg	Mikael Ödlund	Gunnar Sundvall	Anders Wendelheim		
1972	Amatörföreningens CK (Stockholm)	Fredrik Lundberg	Jan Owe-Larsson	Stefan Lundquist	Gunnar Sundvall		
1973	CK ENA (Enköping)	Göran Roxin	Claes Roxin	Ingemar Skoog	Bo Ore		
1974	Härnösands CK (Härnösand)	Anders Thidholm	Ragnar Kamp	Christer Mårtensson	Björn Rudström		
1975	Sundsvalls CK (Sundsvall)	Jan Ullsten	Anders Grahn	Mats Nyberg	Bo Söderström		
1976	Sundsvalls CK (Sundsvall)	Jan Ullsten	Mats Nyberg	Anders Grahn	Bo Söderström		
1977	Sundsvalls CK (Sundsvall)	Anders Grahn	Bo Söderström	Mats Nyberg	Bo Göran Strömberg		
1978	Karlstads CK (Karlstad)	Thomas Håkansson	Per Lindeman	Lars Lindgren	Erik Björemo		
1979	Karlstads CK (Karlstad)	Tony Eng	Sören Grahn	Lars Grengmark	Anders Svennerstedt		
1980	CK Skvadern (Sundsvall)	Thomas Norgren	Conny Ekholm	Peter Svedlund	Ecke Pettersson		
1981	CK Skvadern (Sundsvall)	Thomas Norgren	Peter Svedlund	Conny Ekholm	Ecke Pettersson		
1982	Karlstads CK (Karlstad)	Sören Grahn	Niclas Järund	Henrik Holmberg	Anders Svennerstedt		
1983	Karlstads CK (Karlstad)	Sören Grahn	Niclas Järund	Henrik Holmberg	Anders Svennerstedt		
1984	Sundsvalls CK (Sundsvall)	Jan Strandlund	Kent Hammarström	Tomas Andersson	Ulf Wallgren		
1985	Härnösands CK (Härnösand)	Dan-Ola Eriksson	Jonas Sjölander	Christer Nylund	Stig Pettersson		
1986	Örebro DCK (Örebro)	Peter Larsson	Örjan Erixon	Krister Olsson	Mats Rosenhed		
1987	Härnösands CK (Härnösand)	Tomas Nordin	Örjan Jonsson	Glenn Haglund	Stefan Timan		
1988	Östersunds CK (Östersund)	Peter Lindholm	Magnus Swartling	Johan Hansson	Niklas Kallerbäck		
1989	Östersunds CK (Östersund)	Peter Lindholm	Magnus Swartling	Johan Hansson	Peter Narup		
1990	Östersunds CK (Östersund)	Peter Lindholm	Magnus Swartling	Magnus Burman	Peter Narup		
1991	Härnösands CK (Härnösand)	Tomas Nordin	Örjan Jonsson	Stefan Timan	Jan Wallin		
1992	Malungs CC (Malung)	Joakim Carlsson	Mathias Carlsson	Ola Kindlund	Lars Eriksson	Peter Danielsson	
1993	Härnösands CK (Härnösand)	Per Granqvist	Emil Marklund	Peter Hillblom	Emil Nordkvist		
1994	Härnösands CK (Härnösand)	Per Granqvist	Emil Marklund	Peter Hillblom	Emil Nordkvist		
1995	Härnösands CK (Härnösand)	Per Granqvist	Fredrik Timan	Peter Hillblom	Emil Nordkvist		
1996	Svegs CK (Sveg)	Martin Mattsson	Daniel Eriksson	Magnus Bredesen	Simon Reinholdsson		
1997	Svegs CK (Sveg)	Martin Mattsson	Magnus Bredesen	Simon Reinholdsson	Jens Olofsson	Mattias Olsson	
1998	Sundsvalls CK (Sundsvall)	Henrik Edlund	Mikael Sundqvist	Nils Olofsson	Magnus Nilsson		
1999	Karlstads CK (Karlstad)	Patric Håkansson	David Kallin	Thomas Wallentinsson	Rickard Högström		
2000	Malungs CC (Malung)	Mikael Sundqvist	Jonas Johansson	Henrik Johansson	Daniel Tenn		
2001	Sundsvalls CK (Sundsvall)	Eric Carlsén	Carl-Axel Dahlin	Nils Carlsén	Emanuel Allberg		
2002	Sundsvalls CK (Sundsvall)	Eric Carlsén	Carl-Axel Dahlin	Nils Carlsén	Emanuel Allberg		
2003	Sundsvalls CK (Sundsvall)	Eric Carlsén	Carl-Axel Dahlin	Nils Carlsén	Emanuel Allberg		
2004	Örnsköldsviks CK (Örnsköldsvik)	Niklas Edin	Jörgen Granberg	Stefan Nyström	Fredrik Lindberg		
2005	Sundbybergs CK (Sundbyberg)	Nils Carlsén	Sebastian Kraupp	Marcus Hasselborg	Emanuel Allberg		
2006	Sundbybergs CK (Sundbyberg)	Nils Carlsén (4th)	Niklas Edin (skip)	Marcus Hasselborg	Emanuel Allberg		
2007	Sundbybergs CK (Sundbyberg)	Niklas Edin	Marcus Hasselborg	Emanuel Allberg	Daniel Lövstrand		
2008	Karlstads CK (Karlstad)	Oskar Eriksson	Henric Jonsson	Marcus Franzén	Nils Karlsson		
2009	Lits CC	Kristian Lindström (4th)	Oskar Eriksson (skip)	Henrik Leek	Alexander Lindström	Christoffer Sundgren	
2010	Skellefteå CK (Skellefteå)	Patric Mabergs	Gustav Eskilsson	Jesper Johansson	Victor Herlin		
2011	Lits CC	Kristian Lindström (4th)	Oskar Eriksson (skip)	Henrik Leek	Alexander Lindström		
2012	Sundbybergs CK (Sundbyberg)	Rasmus Wranå	Jordan Wåhlin	Daniel Lövstrand	Axel Sjöberg		Mats Wranå
2013	Skellefteå CK (Skellefteå)	Patric Mabergs (4th)	Gustav Eskilsson (skip)	Jesper Johansson	Johannes Patz		Flemming Patz
2014	Härnösands CK (Härnösand)	Fredrik Nyman	Simon Granbom	Johannes Patz	Victor Martinsson		Hans Nyman
2015	Härnösands CK (Härnösand)	Fredrik Nyman	Simon Granbom	Johannes Patz	Victor Martinsson		Hans Nyman
2016	Sundbybergs CK (Sundbyberg)	Rasmus Wranå	Fredrik Nyman	Jordan Wåhlin	Max Bäck	Axel Sjöberg	Mats Wranå
2017	Göteborg CK Nygren (Gothenburg)	Johan Nygren	Fabian Wingfors	Emil Hermansson	Max Bäck	Anton Degerfeldt	Greta Aurell
2018	Karlstads CK (Karlstad)	Daniel Magnusson	Johan Nygren	Anton Regosa	Sebastian Jones		Greta Aurell
2019	Svegs CK (Sveg)	Daniel Berggren	Johan Järvensson	Emil Hermansson	Albert Berglund		
2020	Karlstads CK (Karlstad)	Daniel Magnusson (curler)	Robin Ahlberg	Anton Regosa	Sebastian Jones		Sebastian Kraupp
2021	Cancelled due to the COVID-19 pandemic in Sweden						
2022	Mjölby AI CF (Mjölby)	Axel Landelius	Alfons Johansson	Pontus Söderberg Persson	Olle Moberg	Jonas Bergens	Lars Landelius
2023	Mjölby AI CF (Mjölby) Team Landelius						
2024	IK Fyris Blackstones						
2025	Sundbybergs CK (Sundbyberg)	Vilmer Nygren	Alexander Dryburgh	Dante Alexander	Jonatan Meyerson		James Dryburgh
2026	Sundbybergs CK (Sundbyberg)	Vilmer Nygren	Alexander Dryburgh	Jonatan Meyerson	Kalle Claesson		James Dryburgh

=== Women ===
Year	Champion team (City, curling club)	Skip	Third	Second	Lead	Alternate	Coach
1973	Jönköping CC (Jönköping)	Inger Sundström	Eva Sundström	Pia Nilsson	Ann Sofie Marklund		
1974	Women's championship was not held						
1975	Women's championship was not held						
1976	Karlstads CK (Karlstad)	Marie Pettersson	Carina Olsson	Annika Nerman	Vivi Richter		
1977	Örebro DCK (Örebro)	Anita Borg	Agneta Johnson	Maria Fallqvist	Ann-Marie Ringqvist		
1978	Örebro CK (Örebro)	Susanne Dahlin	Anette Gollner	Agneta Ivarsson	Åsa Broström		
1979	Örebro CK (Örebro)	Carina Sers	Eva Schön	Ingrid Thulin	Lena Nedergård		
1980	Karlstads CK (Karlstad)	Carina Fredström	Lotta Giesenfeld	Bitte Berg	Tette Alström		
1981	Örebro CK (Örebro)	Annika Ericsson	Pia Ericson	Åsa Broström	Susanne Dahlin		
1982	Sollefteå CK (Sollefteå)	Birgitta Hansen	Ulla Simonsson	Gunilla Landstedt	Maria Andersson		
1983	Härnösands CK (Härnösand)	Anette Norberg	Carina Nilsson	Louise Marmont	Anna Rindeskog		
1984	Falun CC (Falun)	Katarina Hjort	Helena Svensson	Karin Berggren	Anna Eggertz		
1985	Umeå CK (Umeå)	Elisabet Johansson	Eva-Lena Jonsson	Katarina Nyberg	Elisabeth Persson		
1986	Härnösands CK (Härnösand)	Anette Norberg	Sofie Marmont	Louise Marmont	Anna Rindeskog		
1987	Härnösands CK (Härnösand)	Anette Norberg	Anna Rindeskog	Louise Marmont	Carina Westman		
1988	Frösö-Oden CK	Annika Lööf	Elisabeth Hansson	Catharina Eklund	Malin Lundberg		
1989	Härnösands CK (Härnösand)	Cathrine Norberg	Mari Högqvist	Helene Granqvist	Annica Eklund		
1990	Härnösands CK (Härnösand)	Cathrine Norberg	Mari Högqvist	Helene Granqvist	Annica Eklund		
1991	Runstenen-Väsby CG	Eva Eriksson	Maria Söderqvist	Elisabeth de Brito	Åsa Eriksson		
1992	Runstenen-Väsby CG	Eva Eriksson	Maria Söderqvist	Elisabeth de Brito	Åsa Eriksson		
1993	Svegs CK (Sveg)	Ulrika Bergman (4th)	Margareta Lindahl (skip)	Anna Bergström	Elenor Mattsson		
1994	Svegs CK (Sveg)	Ulrika Bergman (4th)	Margareta Lindahl (skip)	Anna Bergström	Mia Zackrisson		
1995	Svegs CK (Sveg)	Ulrika Bergman (4th)	Margareta Lindahl (skip)	Anna Bergström	Mia Zackrisson		
1996	Svegs CK (Sveg)	Ulrika Bergman (4th)	Margareta Lindahl (skip)	Mia Zackrisson	Anna Blom	Linda Kjerr	
1997	Svegs CK (Sveg)	Margaretha Sigfridsson	Maria Engholm	Anna-Kari Lindholm	Maria Halvarsson		
1998	Svegs CK (Sveg)	Matilda Mattsson	Lisa Löfskog	Kajsa Bergström	Jenny Hammarström		
1999	Svegs CK (Sveg)	Matilda Mattsson	Lisa Löfskog	Kajsa Bergström	Jenny Hammarström		
2000	Svegs CK (Sveg)	Matilda Mattsson	Lisa Löfskog	Kajsa Bergström	Jenny Hammarström		
2001	Svegs CK (Sveg)	Matilda Mattsson	Lisa Löfskog	Kajsa Bergström	Jenny Hammarström		
2002	Svegs CK (Sveg)	Matilda Mattsson	Lisa Löfskog	Kajsa Bergström	Jenny Hammarström		
2003	Svegs CK (Sveg)	Matilda Mattsson	Lisa Löfskog	Ann-Christine Nordqvist	Jenny Hammarström		
2004	Skellefteå CK (Skellefteå)	Stina Viktorsson	Anna Viktorsson	Maria Wennerström	Sofie Sidén		
2005	Skellefteå CK (Skellefteå)	Stina Viktorsson	Sofie Sidén	Maria Wennerström	Jenny Zetterquist		
2006	Skellefteå CK (Skellefteå)	Stina Viktorsson	Maria Wennerström	Sofie Sidén	Matilda Rodin		
2007	Östersunds CK (Östersund)	Emma Berg	Emma Sunding	Elin Mårtensson	Malin Landin	Daniela Svantesson	
2008	Östersunds CK (Östersund)	Cecilia Östlund	Sara Carlsson	Anna Domeij	Lotta Lennartsson		
2009	Sundbybergs CK (Sundbyberg)	Anna Hasselborg	Agnes Knochenhauer	Sofie Sidén	Zandra Flyg		
2010	CK Granit-Gävle (Gävle)	Anna Hasselborg	Jonna McManus	Agnes Knochenhauer	Sara McManus	Anna Huhta	
2011	CK Granit-Gävle (Gävle)	Jonna McManus	Sara McManus	Anna Huhta	Sofia Mabergs		
2012	CK Granit-Gävle (Gävle)	Sara McManus	Anna Huhta	Marina Stener	Sofia Mabergs		
2013	CK Granit-Gävle (Gävle)	Malin Ekholm (4th)	Rosalie Egli	Sofia Mabergs	Sara McManus (skip)		Stuart McManus
2014	Sundbybergs CK (Sundbyberg)	Isabella Wranå	Jennie Wåhlin	Fanny Sjöberg	Elin Lövstrand		Gerry Wåhlin
2015	Sundbybergs CK (Sundbyberg)	Isabella Wranå	Jennie Wåhlin	Johanna Heldin	Fanny Sjöberg		
2016	Danderyds CK Westman	?	?	?	?		
2017	Sundbybergs CK (Sundbyberg)	Isabella Wranå	Jennie Wåhlin	Almida de Val	Fanny Sjöberg		Gerry Wåhlin
2018	Sundbybergs CK (Sundbyberg)	Isabella Wranå	Jennie Wåhlin	Almida de Val	Fanny Sjöberg		Margaretha Sigfridsson
2019	Sundbybergs CK (Sundbyberg)	Tova Sundberg	Jennie Wåhlin	Almida de Val	Fanny Sjöberg	Maria Larsson	
2020	Mjölby AI CF (Mjölby)	Emma Moberg	Rebecka Thunman	Emma Landelius	Mikaela Altebro		Flemming Patz
2021	Cancelled due to the COVID-19 pandemic in Sweden						
2022	Sundbybergs CK (Sundbyberg)	Moa Dryburgh	Thea Orefjord	Moa Nilsson	Moa Tjärnlund		Margaretha Dryburgh
2023	Sundbybergs CK (Sundbyberg) Foxglide						
2024	Sundbybergs CK (Sundbyberg) Team Dryburgh						
2025	Sundbybergs CK (Sundbyberg)	Moa Dryburgh	Thea Orefjord	Moa Tjärnlund	Maja Roxin		Margaretha Dryburgh
2026	Sundbybergs CK (Sundbyberg)	Moa Dryburgh	Thea Orefjord	Moa Tjärnlund	Maja Roxin		Margaretha Dryburgh

== Mixed Doubles ==
Year	Champion team (City, curling club)	Female	Male	Coach
2023	Sundbybergs CK (Sundbyberg) / Mjölby AI CF (Mjölby) Orefjord/Moberg			
2024	Sundbybergs CK (Sundbyberg) Dryburgh/Landelius			
2025	Sundbybergs CK (Sundbyberg)	Moa Dryburgh	Vilmer Nygren	Johan Nygren
2026	Sundbybergs CK (Sundbyberg)	Moa Dryburgh	Vilmer Nygren	Johan Nygren

== See also ==
- Swedish Men's Curling Championship
- Swedish Women's Curling Championship
- Swedish Mixed Curling Championship
- Swedish Mixed Doubles Curling Championship
- Swedish Senior Curling Championships
- Swedish Wheelchair Curling Championship
