= Mabergs =

Mabergs is a surname, originating from Sweden. Notable people with the surname include:

- Joakim Mabergs (Joakim Carlsson) (born 1972), Swedish curler
- Mathias Mabergs (Mathias Carlsson) (born 1975), Swedish curler and coach
- Mats Mabergs (born 1962), Swedish curler and coach
- Patric Mabergs (born 1992), Swedish curler
- Sofia Mabergs (born 1993), Swedish curler, 2018 Winter Olympic champion
