= Maria Hasselborg =

Swedish curler

Astrid Mio Maria Hasselborg
- Curler ♀
- Other names: Mio
- Born: 19 December 1980 (age 45)

Team
- Curling club: Härnösands CK, CK Granit-Gävle, Gävle

Curling career
- Member Association: Sweden
- European Championship: 3 (2001, 2002, 2006)
Medal record
Curling
European Championships
Gold medal – first place	2001 Vierumäki
Gold medal – first place	2002 Grindelward
Swedish Women's Championship
Gold medal – first place	2006

Astrid Mio Maria Hasselborg (born 19 December 1980) is a Swedish female curler.

She is a two-time European champion.

Hasselborg was born in a family of well-known Swedish curlers; her father Stefan, uncle (Stefan's brother) Mikael, and cousins (Mikael's children) Marcus (son) and Anna (daughter).

== Teams ==
Season	Skip	Third	Second	Lead	Alternate	Coach	Events
2001–02	Anette Norberg	Cathrine Norberg	Eva Lund	Mio Hasselborg	Anna Rindeskog	Stefan Lund	ECC 2001 (gold)
2002	Anette Norberg	Cathrine Norberg	Eva Lund	Helena Lingham	Mio Hasselborg	Stefan Lund	ECC 2002 (gold)
2002–03	Anna Bergström	Ulrika Bergman	Maria "Mia" Zackrisson	Mio Hasselborg			
2005–06	Camilla Johansson	Katarina Nyberg	Mio Hasselborg	Elisabeth Persson	Linda Ohlson		SWCC 2006 (gold)
2006–07	Camilla Johansson	Katarina Nyberg	Mio Hasselborg	Elisabeth Persson	Linda Ohlsson	Per Noreen	ECC 2006 (6th)
