= Anna Blom =

Swedish female curler

- Curler ♀
- Born: 9 April 1976 (age 50); Stocksund

Team
- Curling club: Svegs CK, Sveg, Stocksunds CK, Stockholm, Härnösands CK, Härnösand

Curling career
- Member Association: Sweden
- World Championship: 1 (1997)
- European Championship: 1 (1998)
- Other appearances: World Junior Championships: 1 (1996)
Medal record
Curling
Swedish Women's Championship
Gold medal – first place	1998
Bronze medal – third place	1999
World Junior Championships
Bronze medal – third place	1996 Red Deer

Anna Maria Blom (born 9 April 1976) is a Swedish female curler.

She is a 1998 Swedish women's champion.

== Teams ==
Season	Skip	Third	Second	Lead	Alternate	Coach	Events
1995–96	Ulrika Bergman (fourth)	Margareta Lindahl (skip)	Mia Zackrisson	Linda Kjerr	Anna Blom		SJCC 1996 (gold); WJCC 1996 (bronze)
1996–97	Cathrine Norberg	Helena Svensson	Anna Blom	Annika Lööf	Margaretha Lindahl	Stefan Hasselborg	WCC 1997 (5th)
1997–98	Anette Norberg	Cathrine Norberg	Helena Svensson	Anna Blom			SWCC 1998 (gold)
1998–99	Anette Norberg	Cathrine Norberg	Helena Lingham	Anna Blom	Eva Lund (ECC)	Stefan Hasselborg, Hans-Erik Hägglund	ECC 1998 (5th); SWCC 1999 (bronze)
