= Anna Rindeskog =

Swedish curler

- Curler ♀
- Born: 4 April 1967 (age 59); Härnösand, Sweden

Team
- Curling club: Härnösands CK, Härnösand

Curling career
- Member Association: Sweden
- World Championship: 3 (1988, 1989, 1991)
- European Championship: 3 (1984, 1987, 1989)
- Olympic: 1 (1992) (demo)
- Other appearances: World Senior Curling Championships: 1 (2018)
Medal record
Curling
World Championships
Bronze medal – third place	1988 Glasgow
Bronze medal – third place	1989 Milwaukee
Bronze medal – third place	1991 Winnipeg
European Championships
Gold medal – first place	2001 Vierumäki
Silver medal – second place	1984 Morzine
Silver medal – second place	1987 Oberstdorf
Bronze medal – third place	1989 Engelberg
Bronze medal – third place	1991 Chamonix
Swedish Women's Championship
Gold medal – first place	1987
Gold medal – first place	1989
Gold medal – first place	1991

Anna Cecilia Rindeskog (born 4 April 1967 in Härnösand) is a Swedish curler.

She is a 2001 European champion and long-time teammate of Anette Norberg. She competed at the 1992 Winter Olympics when curling was a demonstration sport.

In 1989 she was inducted into the Swedish Curling Hall of Fame.

== Teams ==
=== Women's ===
Season	Skip	Third	Second	Lead	Alternate	Coach	Events
1982–83	Anette Norberg	Carina Nilsson	Louise Marmont	Anna Rindeskog	Ulla Simonsson		SJCC 1983 (gold); EJCC 1983 (bronze)
1984–85	Anette Norberg	Anna Rindeskog	Sofie Marmont	Louise Marmont			ECC 1984 (silver)
1985–86	Anette Norberg	Sofie Marmont	Anna Rindeskog	Louise Marmont			SJCC 1986 (gold); EJCC 1986 (silver)
1986–87	Anette Norberg	Carina Westman	Anna Rindeskog	Louise Marmont			SJCC 1987 (gold); EJCC 1987 (silver)
1986–87	Anette Norberg	Anna Rindeskog	Sofie Marmont	Louise Marmont			SWCC 1987 (gold)
1987–88	Anette Norberg	Sofie Marmont	Anna Rindeskog	Louise Marmont			ECC 1987 (silver)
1987–88	Anette Norberg	Anna Rindeskog	Sofie Marmont	Louise Marmont			WCC 1988 (bronze)
1988–89	Anette Norberg	Anna Rindeskog	Sofie Marmont	Louise Marmont			SWCC 1989 (gold); WCC 1989 (bronze)
1989–90	Anette Norberg	Anna Rindeskog	Sofie Marmont	Louise Marmont			ECC 1989 (bronze)
1990–91	Anette Norberg	Cathrine Norberg	Anna Rindeskog	Helene Granqvist	Ann-Catrin Kjerr		SWCC 1991 (gold); WCC 1991 (bronze)
1991–92	Anette Norberg	Anna Rindeskog	Cathrine Norberg	Helene Granqvist	Ann-Catrin Kjerr		OG 1992 (demo) (5th)
2001–02	Anette Norberg	Cathrine Norberg	Eva Lund	Maria Hasselborg	Anna Rindeskog		ECC 2001 (gold)
2017–18	Anette Norberg	Helena Lingham	Anna Klange	Anna Rindeskog	Susanne Patz	Therese Westman	WSCC 2018 (4th)

=== Mixed ===
Season	Skip	Third	Second	Lead	Events
2000–01	Anna Rindeskog	Christer Rickman	Johanna Hallström	Per Södergren	SMxCC 2001 (gold)
