= Helene Granqvist =

Swedish curler

- Curler ♀
- Born: 13 February 1970 (age 56); Härnösand

Team
- Curling club: Härnösands CK, Härnösand

Curling career
- Member Association: Sweden
- World Championship: 1 (1991)
- European Championship: 2 (1991, 1994)
- Olympic: 1 (1992) (demo)
- Other appearances: World Junior Championships: 2 (1989, 1990)
Medal record
Curling
World Championships
Bronze medal – third place	1991 Winnipeg
European Championships
Bronze medal – third place	1991 Chamonix
Swedish Women's Championship
Gold medal – first place	1991
Gold medal – first place	1994
World Junior Championships
Silver medal – second place	1990 Portage la Prairie

Helene Granqvist (born 13 February 1970 in Härnösand) is a Swedish curler.

She is a 1991 World bronze medallist and 1991 European bronze medallist. She competed at the 1992 Winter Olympics when curling was a demonstration sport.

== Teams ==
=== Women's ===
Season	Skip	Third	Second	Lead	Alternate	Coach	Events
1988–89	Cathrine Norberg	Mari Högqvist	Helene Granqvist	Annica Eklund	Helena Klange		SJCC 1989 (gold); WJCC 1989 (4th)
1989–90	Cathrine Norberg	Mari Högqvist	Helene Granqvist	Annica Eklund	Eva Eriksson		SJCC 1990 (gold); WJCC 1990 (silver)
1990–91	Anette Norberg	Cathrine Norberg	Anna Rindeskog	Helene Granqvist	Ann-Catrin Kjerr		SWCC 1991 (gold); WCC 1991 (bronze)
1991–92	Anette Norberg	Anna Rindeskog	Cathrine Norberg	Helene Granqvist	Ann-Catrin Kjerr		ECC 1991 (bronze); OG 1992 (demo) (5th)
1993–94	Anette Norberg	Cathrine Norberg	Helena Klange	Helene Granqvist			SWCC 1994 (gold)
1994–95	Anette Norberg	Cathrine Norberg	Helena Klange	Helene Granqvist	Elisabeth Hansson	Åke Norberg	ECC 1994 (5th)

=== Mixed ===
Season	Skip	Third	Second	Lead	Events
1995	Peja Lindholm	Cathrine Norberg	Peter Narup	Helene Granqvist	SMxCC 1995 (gold)
