= 2019 Swedish Women's Curling Championship =

- Host city: Jönköping
- Dates: 2-6 January 2019
- Winner: Sundbybergs CK Team Hasselborg (Sundbyberg)
- Curling club: Sundbybergs CK, Sundbyberg
- Skip: Anna Hasselborg
- Third: Sara McManus
- Second: Agnes Knochenhauer
- Lead: Sofia Mabergs
- Alternate: Tilda Knochenhauer
- Finalist: Sundbybergs CK Team Panthera (Sundbyberg; Isabella Wranå)

The 2019 Swedish Women's Curling Championship (Swedish: SM Damer, Herrar och Rullstolscurling 2019) was held in Jönköping from 2 to 6 January 2019.

Both 2019 Swedish Men's Curling Championship and 2019 Swedish Wheelchair Curling Championship were held simultaneously with this championship at the same arena.

== Teams ==
Team	Locale	Skip	Third	Second	Lead	Alternate Coach
Härnösands CK Lag Fransson	Härnösand	Cecilia Fransson	Linnéa Svedberg	Vilma Åhlström	Jenny Jonasson	
IK Fyris Team Donald Davies & Partners	Uppsala	Anette Norberg	Therese Westman	Johanna Heldin	Tilde Vermelin	
Mjölby AI Team Moberg	Mjölby	Emma Moberg	Sara Pengel	Alva Sundberg	Mikaela Altebro	
Sundbybergs CK Team Hasselborg	Sundbyberg	Anna Hasselborg	Sara McManus	Agnes Knochenhauer	Sofia Mabergs	Tilda Knochenhauer
Sundbybergs CK Team Pantera	Sundbyberg	Isabella Wranå	Jennie Wåhlin	Almida de Val	Fanny Sjöberg	Margaretha Sigfridsson
Östersunds CK Team Sundberg	Östersund	Tova Sundberg	Emma Sjödin	Maria Larsson	Sofie Bergman	

== Round Robin ==
Key
Team to Final
Teams to Semifinal

	Team	Skip	A1	A2	A3	A4	A5	A6	Wins	Losses	Place
A1	Mjölby AI Team Moberg	Emma Moberg	*	1:9	4:8	2:8	1:7	6:9	0	5	6
A2	Sundbybergs CK Team Hasselborg	Anna Hasselborg	9:1	*	8:3	5:3	8:6	6:5	5	0	1
A3	Härnösands CK Lag Fransson	Cecilia Fransson	8:4	3:8	*	5:10	4:7	3:5	1	4	5
A4	IK Fyris Team Donald Davies	Anette Norberg	8:2	3:5	10:5	*	4:5	10:7	3	2	3
A5	Sundbybergs CK Team Pantera	Isabella Wranå	7:1	6:8	7:4	5:4	*	7:3	4	1	2
A6	Östersunds CK Team Sundberg	Tova Sundberg	9:6	5:6	5:3	7:10	3:7	*	2	3	4

== Playoffs ==
Semifinal			Final
			1	Sundbybergs CK Team Hasselborg	7
2	Sundbybergs CK Team Pantera	7		Sundbybergs CK Team Pantera	5
3	IK Fyris Team Donald Davies	4

Semifinal. 6 January, 9:00 am

Sheet A	1	2	3	4	5	6	7	8	9	10	Final
IK Fyris Team Donald Davies	0	0	1	0	0	1	1	0	1	X	4
Sundbybergs CK Team Pantera	0	2	0	2	1	0	0	2	0	X	7

Final. 6 January, 2:00 pm

Sheet C	1	2	3	4	5	6	7	8	9	10	Final
Sundbybergs CK Team Hasselborg	0	0	2	0	0	3	0	2	0	X	7
Sundbybergs CK Team Pantera	0	0	0	1	1	0	2	0	1	X	5

== Final standings ==
Place	Team	Skip	Games	Wins	Losses
1st place, gold medalist(s)	Sundbybergs CK Team Hasselborg	Anna Hasselborg	6	6	0
2nd place, silver medalist(s)	Sundbybergs CK Team Pantera	Isabella Wranå	7	5	2
3rd place, bronze medalist(s)	IK Fyris Team Donald Davies & Partners	Anette Norberg	6	3	3
4	Östersunds CK Team Sundberg	Tova Sundberg	5	2	3
5	Härnösands CK Lag Fransson	Cecilia Fransson	5	1	4
6	Mjölby AI Team Moberg	Emma Moberg	5	0	5

== See also ==
- 2019 Swedish Men's Curling Championship
- 2019 Swedish Mixed Curling Championship
- 2019 Swedish Mixed Doubles Curling Championship
- 2019 Swedish Junior Curling Championships
- 2019 Swedish Wheelchair Curling Championship
