= Maud Nordlander =

Swedish curler

- Curler ♀
- Born: 11 November 1943 (age 83)

Team
- Curling club: Sundsvalls CK, Sundsvall, Norrköpings CK, Norrköping, Djursholms CK, Djursholm

Curling career
- Member Association: Sweden
- World Championship: 2 (1985, 1986)
- European Championship: 1 (1985)
Medal record
Curling
World Championships
Bronze medal – third place	1986 Kelowna
Swedish Women's Championship
Gold medal – first place	1970
Gold medal – first place	1973
Gold medal – first place	1985

Maud Elisabet Nordlander (born 11 November 1943) is a Swedish curler.

She is a 1986 World championship bronze medallist.

In 1977 she was inducted into the Swedish Curling Hall of Fame.

== Teams ==
Season	Skip	Third	Second	Lead	Events
1969–70	Goldis Berggren	Barbro Berggren	Birgitta Jarehov	Maud Nordlander	SWCC 1970 (gold)
1972–73	Gunvor Hamberg	Maud Nordlander	Ewa Hallberg	Birgitta Eriksson	SWCC 1973 (gold)
1984–85	Maud Nordlander (fourth)	Inga Arfwidsson (skip)	Ulrika Åkerberg	Barbro Arfwidsson	SWCC 1985 (gold); WCC 1985 (4th)
1985–86	Maud Nordlander (fourth)	Inga Arfwidsson (skip)	Ulrika Åkerberg	Barbro Arfwidsson	ECC 1985 (5th); WCC 1986 (bronze)
2007–08	Inga Arfwidsson	Maud Nordlander	Ewa Linderholm	Ulrika Åkerberg	SSCC 2008 (silver)
2010–11	Inga Arfwidsson	Ulrika Åkerberg-Palm	Inger Berg	Maud Nordlander	
