= Sofie Marmont =

Swedish curler

- Curler ♀
- Born: 11 January 1965 (age 61)

Team
- Curling club: Härnösands CK, Härnösand

Curling career
- Member Association: Sweden
- World Championship: 2 (1988, 1989)
- European Championship: 3 (1984, 1987, 1989)
Medal record
Curling
World Championships
Bronze medal – third place	1988 Glasgow
Bronze medal – third place	1989 Milwaukee
European Championships
Silver medal – second place	1984 Morzine
Silver medal – second place	1987 Oberstdorf
Bronze medal – third place	1989 Engelberg
Swedish Women's Championship
Gold medal – first place	1987
Gold medal – first place	1989

Sofie Marmont (born 11 January 1965; also known in marriage as Sofie Marmont-Nordlund) is a Swedish curler.

She was a long-time teammate with her sister Louise on Anette Norberg's team.

In 1989 she was inducted into the Swedish Curling Hall of Fame.

== Teams ==
Season	Skip	Third	Second	Lead	Events
1984–85	Anette Norberg	Anna Rindeskog	Sofie Marmont	Louise Marmont	ECC 1984 (silver)
1985–86	Anette Norberg	Sofie Marmont	Anna Rindeskog	Louise Marmont	SJCC 1986 (gold); EJCC 1986 (silver)
1986–87	Anette Norberg	Anna Rindeskog	Sofie Marmont	Louise Marmont	SWCC 1987 (gold)
1987–88	Anette Norberg	Sofie Marmont	Anna Rindeskog	Louise Marmont	ECC 1987 (silver)
1987–88	Anette Norberg	Anna Rindeskog	Sofie Marmont	Louise Marmont	WCC 1988 (bronze)
1988–89	Anette Norberg	Anna Rindeskog	Sofie Marmont	Louise Marmont	SWCC 1989 (gold); WCC 1989 (bronze)
1989–90	Anette Norberg	Anna Rindeskog	Sofie Marmont	Louise Marmont	ECC 1989 (bronze)
