= Patric Håkansson =

Swedish male curler

- Curler ♂
- Other names: Pim
- Born: 26 August 1977 (age 49); Karlstad

Team
- Curling club: Karlstads CK, Karlstad, Härnösands CK, Härnösand

Curling career
- Member Association: Sweden
- World Championship: 1 (2005)
- Other appearances: World Junior Championships: 1 (1999)
Medal record
Curling

Patric "Pim" Håkansson (born 26 August 1977 in Karlstad; also known as Patric Klaremo) is a Swedish curler and curling coach.

== Teams ==
Season	Skip	Third	Second	Lead	Alternate	Coach	Events
1998–99	Patric Håkansson	David Kallin	Thomas Wallentinsson	Rickard Högström	Jonas Johansson (WJCC)	Elisabeth Högström	SJCC 1999 (gold) , WJCC 1999 (4th)
2004–05	Eric Carlsén	Andreas Prytz	Daniel Prytz	Patric Håkansson	Mathias Carlsson	Fredrik Hallström	WCC 2005 (9th)
2005–06	Eric Carlsén	Andreas Prytz	Daniel Prytz	Patric Håkansson			
2006–07	Andreas Prytz	Patric Håkansson	Peter Hillblom	Orjan Eriksson			
2007–08	Andreas Prytz	Patric Håkansson	Peter Hillblom	Orjan Eriksson			

== Record as a coach of national teams ==
Year	Tournament, event	National team	Place
2015	2015 European Curling Championships	Sweden (women)	5

== Personal life ==
Patric is from a family of curlers: his father Lars-Erik is a 1971 Swedish men's curling champion, uncle Thomas is a 1976 European bronze medallist and two-time Swedish champion, and grandfather Stig is a 1968 Swedish men's champion.
