= 1992 World Women's Curling Championship =

- Host city: Garmisch-Partenkirchen, Germany
- Arena: Olympic Eisstadion
- Dates: March 28 - April 5, 1992
- Winner: Sweden
- Curling club: Umeå CK
- Skip: Elisabet Johansson
- Third: Katarina Nyberg
- Second: Louise Marmont
- Lead: Elisabeth Persson
- Alternate: Annika Lööf
- Finalist: United States (Lisa Schoeneberg)

The 1992 World Women's Curling Championship (branded as 1992 Canada Safeway World Women's Curling Championship for sponsorship reasons) took place from March 28–April 5, 1992, at the Olympic Eisstadion in Garmisch-Partenkirchen, Germany. It was also the first year a team from Asia qualified for the championship.

== Teams ==
Canada	Denmark	Finland	Germany
Fort Rouge CC, Winnipeg, Manitoba Skip: Connie Laliberte; Third: Laurie Allen; Second: Cathy Gauthier; Lead: Janet Arnott	Hvidovre CC Skip: Helena Blach; Third: Malene Krause; Second: Lene Bidstrup; Lead: Susanne Slotsager	Hyvinkää CC Skip: Jaana Jokela; Third: Terhi Aro; Second: Nina Pöllänen; Lead: Heidi Koskiheimo	Füssen CC Skip: Josefine Einsle; Third: Petra Tschetsch-Hiltensberger; Second: Elisabeth Ländle; Lead: Karin Fischer; Alternate: Almut Hege-Schöll
Japan	Norway	Scotland	Sweden
Obihiro CC, Hokkaido Skip: Mayumi Seguchi; Third: Midori Kudoh; Second: Mayumi Abe; Lead: Rumi Michita; Alternate: Hidemi Itai	Snarøen CC, Oslo Skip: Dordi Nordby; Third: Hanne Pettersen; Second: Marianne Aspelin; Lead: Cecilie Torhaug; Alternate: Cathrine Ulrichsen	Laurencekirk CC, Aberdeen Skip: Jackie Lockhart; Third: Deborah Knox; Second: Wendy Bell; Lead: Judith Stobbie; Alternate: Isobel Torrance, Jr.	Umeå CK Skip: Elisabet Johansson; Third: Katarina Nyberg; Second: Louise Marmont; Lead: Elisabeth Persson; Alternate: Annika Lööf
Switzerland	United States		
Lausanne-Olympique CC Skip: Janet Hürlimann; Third: Angela Lutz; Second: Laurence Bidaud; Lead: Sandrine Mercier	Madison CC, Wisconsin Skip: Lisa Schoeneberg; Third: Amy Hatten-Wright; Second: Lori Mountford; Lead: Jill Jones		

== Round-robin standings ==
Country	Skip	W	L
Sweden	Elisabet Johansson	8	1
United States	Lisa Schoeneberg	7	2
Switzerland	Janet Hürlimann	6	3
Canada	Connie Laliberte	5	4
Scotland	Jackie Lockhart	4	5
Norway	Dordi Nordby	4	5
Denmark	Helena Blach	4	5
Germany	Josefine Einsle	3	6
Japan	Mayumi Seguchi	2	7
Finland	Jaana Jokela	2	7

== Round-robin results ==
=== Draw 1 ===
Sheet A	Final
Scotland (Lockhart)	4
Germany (Einsle)	8

Sheet B	Final
Sweden (Johansson)	8
Norway (Nordby)	7

Sheet C	Final
Japan (Mayumi)	3
United States (Schoeneberg)	9

Sheet D	Final
Switzerland (Hürlimann)	7
Denmark (Blach)	5

Sheet E	Final
Finland (Jokela)	6
Canada (Laliberte)	10

=== Draw 2 ===
Sheet A	Final
United States (Schoeneberg)	7
Norway (Nordby)	4

Sheet B	Final
Scotland (Lockhart)	3
Switzerland (Hürlimann)	10

Sheet C	Final
Denmark (Blach)	6
Canada (Laliberte)	8

Sheet D	Final
Finland (Jokela)	5
Germany (Einsle)	3

Sheet E	Final
Japan (Mayumi)	5
Sweden (Johansson)	11

=== Draw 3 ===
Sheet A	Final
United States (Schoeneberg)	5
Sweden (Johansson)	9

Sheet B	Final
Norway (Nordby)	6
Japan (Mayumi)	5

Sheet C	Final
Switzerland (Hürlimann)	7
Finland (Jokela)	3

Sheet D	Final
Germany (Einsle)	4
Denmark (Blach)	7

Sheet E	Final
Canada (Laliberte)	3
Scotland (Lockhart)	8

=== Draw 4 ===
Sheet A	Final
Denmark (Blach)	7
Japan (Mayumi)	5

Sheet B	Final
Norway (Nordby)	6
Finland (Jokela)	7

Sheet C	Final
Canada (Laliberte)	3
Switzerland (Hürlimann)	6

Sheet D	Final
Scotland (Lockhart)	3
United States (Schoeneberg)	7

Sheet E	Final
Sweden (Johansson)	6
Germany (Einsle)	4

=== Draw 5 ===
Sheet A	Final
Scotland (Lockhart)	7
Denmark (Blach)	5

Sheet B	Final
Norway (Nordby)	6
Switzerland (Hürlimann)	8

Sheet C	Final
Germany (Einsle)	6
United States (Schoeneberg)	11

Sheet D	Final
Canada (Laliberte)	9
Japan (Mayumi)	6

Sheet E	Final
Sweden (Johansson)	7
Finland (Jokela)	6

=== Draw 6 ===
Sheet A	Final
Switzerland (Hürlimann)	0
Sweden (Johansson)	11

Sheet B	Final
Germany (Einsle)	5
Canada (Laliberte)	6

Sheet C	Final
Norway (Nordby)	5
Scotland (Lockhart)	8

Sheet D	Final
Finland (Jokela)	6
Japan (Mayumi)	8

Sheet E	Final
United States (Schoeneberg)	5
Denmark (Blach)	7

=== Draw 7 ===
Sheet A	Final
Denmark (Blach)	6
Sweden (Johansson)	9

Sheet B	Final
Scotland (Lockhart)	7
Finland (Jokela)	3

Sheet C	Final
Japan (Mayumi)	3
Switzerland (Hürlimann)	7

Sheet D	Final
United States (Schoeneberg)	9
Canada (Laliberte)	8

Sheet E	Final
United States (Schoeneberg)	4
Canada (Laliberte)	10

=== Draw 8 ===
Sheet A	Final
Finland (Jokela)	4
Denmark (Blach)	7

Sheet B	Final
Japan (Mayumi)	5
Germany (Einsle)	7

Sheet C	Final
Sweden (Johansson)	10
Scotland (Lockhart)	6

Sheet D	Final
Canada (Laliberte)	7
Norway (Nordby)	2

Sheet E	Final
Switzerland (Hürlimann)	4
United States (Schoeneberg)	6

=== Draw 9 ===
Sheet A	Final
Sweden (Johansson)	6
Canada (Laliberte)	5

Sheet B	Final
Finland (Jokela)	4
United States (Schoeneberg)	9

Sheet C	Final
Switzerland (Hürlimann)	4
Germany (Einsle)	8

Sheet D	Final
Japan (Mayumi)	10
Scotland (Lockhart)	6

Sheet E	Final
Denmark (Blach)	6
Norway (Nordby)	7

== Playoffs ==
=== Brackets ===
Semi-final
2	United States	8
3	Switzerland	7
1	Sweden	7
4	Canada	5

Final
2	United States	4
1	Sweden	8

=== Final ===
Sheet A	1	2	3	4	5	6	7	8	9	10	Final
United States (Schoeneberg)	0	0	1	0	0	2	0	1	0	X	4
Sweden (Johansson)	2	1	0	1	1	0	2	0	1	X	8
