= Janet Hürlimann =

Swiss female curler and coach

- Curler ♀

Team
- Curling club: Zug CC, Zug, Lausanne-Olympique CC, Lausanne

Curling career
- Member Association: Ontario (1986-1987); Switzerland (1990-present)
- World Championship: 3 (1991, 1992, 1993)
- European Championship: 1 (1997)
Medal record
Curling
World Championships
Bronze medal – third place	1992 Garmisch-Partenkirchen
Swiss Women's Championship
Gold medal – first place	1991
Gold medal – first place	1992
Gold medal – first place	1993

Janet Hürlimann (née Omand) is a former Canadian-Swiss female curler and curling coach.

She is a 1992 World bronze medallist.

== Personal life ==
Hürlimann is married to fellow curler Patrick Hürlimann. They have three children, including Briar Hürlimann.

== Teams ==
Season	Skip	Third	Second	Lead	Alternate	Coach	Events
1986–87	Janet Omand	Audra Smith	Margaret Corey	Tracy Jackson			CJCC 1987 (bronze)
1990–91	Janet Hürlimann	Claudia Bärtschi	Jutta Tanner	Corinne Anneler			SWCC 1991 (gold); WCC 1991 (7th)
1991–92	Janet Hürlimann	Angela Lutz	Laurence Bidaud	Sandrine Mercier			SWCC 1992 (gold); WCC 1992 (bronze)
1992–93	Janet Hürlimann	Angela Lutz	Laurence Bidaud	Sandrine Mercier	Laurence Morisetti		SWCC 1993 (gold); WCC 1993 (7th)
1997–98	Graziella Grichting	Janet Hürlimann	Claudia Biner	Inger Müller	Erika Müller	Erika Müller	ECC 1997 (5th)
2008–09	Manuela Kormann	Janet Hürlimann	Sandra Verdun-Steuri	Heike Schwaller			
2009–10	Michèle Jäggi	Janet Hürlimann	Stephanie Jaeggi	Nicole Schwägli			

== Record as a coach of national teams ==
Year	Tournament, event	National team	Place
2017	2017 Japanese Olympic Curling Trials	Chiaki Matsumura	runner-up
