= Lena Mårdberg =

Swedish female curler

- Curler ♀
- Born: 30 December 1963 (age 62)

Team
- Curling club: Frösö-Oden CK, Östersund

Curling career
- Member Association: Sweden
- World Championship: 1 (1990)
- European Championship: 1 (1990)
Medal record
Curling
Swedish Women's Championship
Gold medal – first place	1990

Lena Annette Mårdberg (born 30 December 1963) is a Swedish female curler.

She is a 1990 Swedish women's champion.

== Teams ==
Season	Skip	Third	Second	Lead	Alternate	Events
1989–90	Helena Svensson (fourth)	Lotta Giesenfeld (skip)	Elisabeth Hansson	Annika Lööf	Lena Mårdberg	SWCC 1990 (gold); WCC 1990 (6th)
1990–91	Annika Lööf	Lotta Giesenfeld	Helena Svensson	Elisabeth Hansson	Lena Mårdberg	ECC 1990 (6th)

== Personal life ==
Her husband is Swedish curler Mikael Ljungberg, who played in the 1989 and 1994 World men's championships.
