= Ulrika Åkerberg =

Swedish curler

- Curler ♀
- Born: 4 July 1941 (age 85); Enköping, Sweden

Team
- Curling club: CK ENA, Enköping, Norrköpings CK, Norrköping

Curling career
- Member Association: Sweden
- World Championship: 2 (1985, 1986)
- European Championship: 1 (1985)
Medal record
Curling
World Championships
Bronze medal – third place	1986 Kelowna
Swedish Women's Championship
Gold medal – first place	1985

Anna Ulrika Maria Åkerberg Palm (born 4 July 1941 in Enköping) is a Swedish curler. Also known as Ulrika Åkerberg-Palm.

She is a 1986 World championship bronze medallist.

In 1983 she was inducted into the Swedish Curling Hall of Fame.

== Teams ==
=== Women's ===
Season	Skip	Third	Second	Lead	Events
1984–85	Maud Nordlander (fourth)	Inga Arfwidsson (skip)	Ulrika Åkerberg	Barbro Arfwidsson	SWCC 1985 (gold); WCC 1985 (4th)
1985–86	Maud Nordlander (fourth)	Inga Arfwidsson (skip)	Ulrika Åkerberg	Barbro Arfwidsson	ECC 1985 (5th); WCC 1986 (bronze)
2007–08	Inga Arfwidsson	Maud Nordlander	Ewa Linderholm	Ulrika Åkerberg	SSCC 2008 (silver)
2010–11	Inga Arfwidsson	Ulrika Åkerberg-Palm	Inger Berg	Maud Nordlander	

=== Mixed ===
Season	Skip	Third	Second	Lead	Events
1975	Kjell Oscarius	Lilebil Hellström	Claes Roxin	Ulrika Åkerberg	SMxCC 1975 (gold)
1978	Göran Roxin	Ulrika Åkerberg	Claes Roxin	Marie Henriksson	SMxCC 1978 (gold)
1979	Göran Roxin	Ulrika Åkerberg	Claes Roxin	Marie Henriksson	SMxCC 1979 (gold)
1980	Göran Roxin	Ulrika Åkerberg	Claes Roxin	Marie Henriksson	SMxCC 1980 (gold)
1981	Göran Roxin	Ulrika Åkerberg	Claes Roxin	Helene Frestadius	SMxCC 1981 (gold)
