= Lotta Giesenfeld =

Swedish female curler

- Curler ♀
- Born: 11 March 1962 (age 64)

Team
- Curling club: Frösö-Oden CK, Östersund

Curling career
- Member Association: Sweden
- World Championship: 1 (1990)
- European Championship: 1 (1990)
Medal record
Curling
Swedish Women's Championship
Gold medal – first place	1990

Lotta Giesenfeld (born 11 March 1962) is a Swedish female curler.

== Teams ==
Season	Skip	Third	Second	Lead	Alternate	Events
1979–80	Carina Fredström	Lotta Giesenfeld	Bitte Berg	Tette Alström		SJCC 1980 (gold)
1989–90	Helena Svensson (fourth)	Lotta Giesenfeld (skip)	Elisabeth Hansson	Annika Lööf	Lena Mårdberg	SWCC 1990 (gold); WCC 1990 (6th)
1990–91	Annika Lööf	Lotta Giesenfeld	Helena Svensson	Elisabeth Hansson	Lena Mårdberg	ECC 1990 (6th)
