= Sandrine Mercier =

Swiss female curler

- Curler ♀

Team
- Curling club: Lausanne-Olympique CC, Lausanne

Curling career
- Member Association: Switzerland
- World Championship: 3 (1992, 1993, 1994)
Medal record
Curling
World Championships
Bronze medal – third place	1992 Garmisch-Partenkirchen
Swiss Women's Championship
Gold medal – first place	1992
Gold medal – first place	1993
Gold medal – first place	1994

Sandrine Mercier is a former Swiss female curler.

She is a 1992 World bronze medallist.

== Teams ==
Season	Skip	Third	Second	Lead	Alternate	Events
1991–92	Janet Hürlimann	Angela Lutz	Laurence Bidaud	Sandrine Mercier		SWCC 1992 (gold); WCC 1992 (bronze)
1992–93	Janet Hürlimann	Angela Lutz	Laurence Bidaud	Sandrine Mercier	Laurence Morisetti (WCC)	SWCC 1993 (gold); WCC 1993 (7th)
1993–94	Angela Lutz	Laurence Bidaud	Laurence Morisetti	Sandrine Mercier	Claude Orizet (WCC)	SWCC 1994 (gold); WCC 1994 (6th)
