= 2002 European Curling Championships =

International curling competition

The 2002 European Curling Championships were held in Grindelwald, Switzerland December 5–14.

== Men's ==
=== A tournament ===
==== Final round robin standings ====
Team	Skip	W	L
Germany	Sebastian Stock	8	1
Sweden	Peja Lindholm	7	2
Norway	Thomas Ulsrud	7	2
Finland	Markku Uusipaavalniemi	6	3
Denmark	Ulrik Schmidt	5	4
Scotland	Peter Smith	4	5
Switzerland	Ralph Stöckli	3	6
England	James Dixon	3	6
France	Dominique Dupont-Roc	1	8
Austria	Alois Kreidl	1	8

==== Playoffs ====
Semi-final
1	Germany	8
4	Finland	7
2	Sweden	8
3	Norway	5

Final
1	Germany	7
2	Sweden	6
Bronze medal
3	Norway	9
4	Finland	5

===== Semifinals =====
December 13th, 20:00

Sheet B	1	2	3	4	5	6	7	8	9	10	Final
Norway (Ulsrud)	0	0	1	0	0	1	0	3	0	0	5
Sweden (Lindholm)	1	0	0	2	1	0	1	0	3	0	8

Sheet E	1	2	3	4	5	6	7	8	9	10	Final
Germany (Stock)	2	0	0	3	0	1	0	2	0	0	8
Finland (Uusipaavalniemi)	0	1	0	0	1	0	2	0	2	1	7

===== Bronze-medal game =====
December 14th, 14:00

Sheet D	1	2	3	4	5	6	7	8	9	10	Final
Finland (Uusipaavalniemi)	4	0	0	1	0	0	0	0	0	X	5
Norway (Ulsrud)	0	1	1	0	0	2	1	1	3	X	9

===== Gold-medal game =====
December 14th, 14:00

Sheet C	1	2	3	4	5	6	7	8	9	10	Final
Sweden (Lindholm)	0	1	0	0	0	3	0	0	1	1	6
Germany (Stock) 🔨	1	0	1	0	0	0	2	3	0	0	7

==== Medals ====
Medal	Team
Gold	Germany (Sebastian Stock, Daniel Herberg, Stephan Knoll, Markus Messenzehl, and Patrick Hoffman)
Silver	Sweden (Peja Lindholm, Tomas Nordin, Magnus Swartling, Peter Narup, and Anders Kraupp)
Bronze	Norway (Thomas Ulsrud, Torger Nergård, Thomas Due, Johan Høstmælingen, and Thomas Løvold)

== Women's ==
=== A tournament ===
==== Final round robin standings ====
Team	Skip	W	L
Sweden	Anette Norberg	8	1
Norway	Dordi Nordby	7	2
Denmark	Dorthe Holm	6	3
Russia	Olga Jarkova	6	3
Switzerland	Nicole Strausak	5	4
Scotland	Jackie Lockhart	5	4
Germany	Daniela Jentsch	5	4
Czech Republic	Pavia Rubasova	1	8
Finland	Kirsi Nykänen	1	8
France	Sandrine Morand	1	8

==== Playoffs ====
Semi-final
1	Sweden	7
4	Russia	5
2	Norway	11
3	Denmark	12

Final
1	Sweden	7
3	Denmark	4
Bronze medal
4	Russia	8
2	Norway	9

===== Semifinals =====
December 13th, 16:00

Sheet B	1	2	3	4	5	6	7	8	9	10	Final
Denmark (Holm)	0	1	0	2	0	3	0	6	0	0	12
Norway (Nordby)	1	0	3	0	1	0	1	0	3	2	11

Sheet D	1	2	3	4	5	6	7	8	9	10	Final
Sweden (Norberg)	0	1	0	1	2	0	2	0	0	1	7
Russia (Jarkova)	0	0	1	0	0	1	0	2	1	0	5

===== Bronze-medal game =====
December 14th, 10:00

Sheet D	1	2	3	4	5	6	7	8	9	10	Final
Russia (Jarkova)	1	0	0	1	0	0	2	0	3	1	8
Norway (Nordby)	0	2	1	0	4	1	0	1	0	0	9

===== Gold-medal game =====
December 14th, 10:00

Sheet B	1	2	3	4	5	6	7	8	9	10	Final
Sweden (Norberg) 🔨	0	2	2	0	1	1	0	0	0	1	7
Denmark (Holm)	0	0	0	1	0	0	1	1	1	0	4

==== Medals ====
Medal	Team
Gold	Sweden (Anette Norberg, Cathrine Norberg, Eva Lund, Helena Lingham, and Maria Hasselborg)
Silver	Denmark (Dorthe Holm, Malene Krause, Denise Dupont, Lilian Frøhling, and Madeleine Dupont)
Bronze	Norway (Dordi Nordby, Hanne Woods, Marianne Haslum, Camilla Holth, and Marianne Rørvik)
