= Andreas Prytz =

Swedish male curler and coach

- Curler ♂
- Born: 7 December 1972 (age 53)

Team
- Curling club: Härnösands CK, Härnösand

Curling career
- Member Association: Sweden
- World Championship: 1 (2005)
- World Mixed Doubles Championship: 1 (2009)
- European Championship: 1 (2008)
Medal record
Curling
Swedish Men's Championship
Gold medal – first place	2012
Bronze medal – third place	2008
Bronze medal – third place	2013
Bronze medal – third place	2014

Carl Andreas Prytz (born 7 December 1972) is a Swedish curler and curling coach.

He is a 2012 Swedish men's champion, a 2009 Swedish mixed doubles champion and a 2003 Swedish mixed champion.

In 2015 he was inducted into the Swedish Curling Hall of Fame.

== Teams ==
=== Men's ===
Season	Skip	Third	Second	Lead	Alternate	Coach	Events
2003–04	Emil Marklund	Andreas Prytz	Daniel Prytz	Emil Nordqvist			
2004–05	Eric Carlsén	Andreas Prytz	Daniel Prytz	Patric Håkansson	Mathias Carlsson	Fredrik Hallström	WCC 2005 (9th)
2005–06	Eric Carlsén	Andreas Prytz	Daniel Prytz	Patric Håkansson			
2006–07	Andreas Prytz	Patric Håkansson	Peter Hillblom	Orjan Eriksson			
2007–08	Andreas Prytz	Patric Håkansson	Peter Hillblom	Orjan Eriksson			
2007–08	Rickard Hallström	Per Noreen	Andreas Prytz	Fredrik Hallström			SMCC 2008 (bronze)
2008–09	Henrik Edlund (fourth)	Mathias Mabergs (skip)	Emil Marklund	David Kallin	Andreas Prytz	Thomas Skagersten	ECC 2008 (8th)
2008–09	Per Noreen (fourth)	Andreas Prytz	Rickard Hallström (skip)	Fredrik Hallström			SMCC 2009 (5th)
2009–10	Rickard Hallström	Per Noreen	Andreas Prytz	Fredrik Hallström			SMCC 2010 (7th)
2010–11	Per Noreen (fourth)	Rickard Hallström (skip)	Andreas Prytz	Fredrik Hallström	Johannes Patz		SMCC 2011 (9th)
2011–12	Marcus Hasselborg	Peder Folke	Andreas Prytz	Anton Sandström			SMCC 2012 (gold)
2012–13	Marcus Hasselborg	Peder Folke	Andreas Prytz	Anton Sandström			SMCC 2013 (bronze)
2013–14	Marcus Hasselborg	Peder Folke	Andreas Prytz	Anton Sandström	Fredrik Nyman		SMCC 2014 (bronze)

=== Mixed ===
Season	Skip	Third	Second	Lead	Events
1999–00	Andreas Prytz	Christina Bertrup	Magnus "Muggen" Nilsson	Andrea Hedström alternate: Linda Ohlsson	SMxCC 2000 (gold)
2002–03	Andreas Prytz	Christina Bertrup	Magnus Nilsson	Linda Ohlsson	SMxCC 2003 (gold)
2008–09	Andreas Prytz	Stina Viktorsson	Magnus Nilsson	Margaretha Sigfridsson	SMxCC 2009 (5th)
2014–15	Andreas Prytz	Anna Huhta	Mathias Mabergs	Sara McManus	SMxCC 2015 (silver)

=== Mixed doubles ===
Season	Male	Female	Events
2008–09	Andreas Prytz	Sofia Gustafsson	SMDCC 2009 (gold); WMDCC 2009 (7th)
2009–10	Andreas Prytz	Agnes Knochenhauer	SMDCC 2010 (silver)
2010–11	Andreas Prytz	Malin Ekholm	SMDCC 2011 (5th)
2013–14	Andreas Prytz	Sofia Mabergs	SMDCC 2014 (bronze)
2015–16	Andreas Prytz	Sofia Mabergs	SMDCC 2016 (13th)

== Record as a coach of national teams ==
Year	Tournament, event	National team	Place
1998	1998 World Junior Curling Championships	Sweden (junior women)	(bronze)
2002	2002 World Women's Curling Championship	Sweden (women)	(silver)
2008	2008 World Women's Curling Championship	Sweden (women)	(6th)
2022	2022 World Mixed Doubles Curling Championship	Sweden (mixed doubles)	(5th)
2024	2024 World Mixed Doubles Curling Championship	Sweden (mixed doubles)	(gold)
2026	2026 Winter Olympics	Sweden (mixed doubles)	(gold)
