= Daniel Prytz =

Swedish male curler

- Curler ♂
- Born: 30 September 1975 (age 51)

Team
- Curling club: Härnösands CK, Härnösand

Curling career
- Member Association: Sweden
- World Championship: 1 (2005)
Medal record
Curling

Daniel Prytz (born 30 September 1975) is a Swedish curler.

He is a 1997 Swedish mixed champion.

== Teams ==
=== Men's ===
| Season | Skip | Third | Second | Lead | Alternate | Coach | Events |
|---|---|---|---|---|---|---|---|
| 2003–04 | Emil Marklund | Andreas Prytz | Daniel Prytz | Emil Nordqvist | | | |
| 2004–05 | Eric Carlsén | Andreas Prytz | Daniel Prytz | Patric Håkansson | Mathias Carlsson | Fredrik Hallström | WCC 2005 (9th) |
| 2005–06 | Eric Carlsén | Andreas Prytz | Daniel Prytz | Patric Håkansson | | | |

=== Mixed ===
| Season | Skip | Third | Second | Lead | Alternate | Events |
|---|---|---|---|---|---|---|
| 1996–97 | Joakim Carlsson | Christina Carlsson | Mathias Carlsson | Marja Bergström | Daniel Prytz | SMxCC 1997 (gold) |
