= Joakim Carlsson =

Swedish curler (born 1972)

- Curler ♂
- Born: 18 August 1972 (age 54)

Team
- Curling club: Malung CC

Curling career
- Member Association: Sweden
- European Championship: 2 (1998, 1999)
Medal record
Curling
European Championships
Gold medal – first place	1998 Flims
Swedish Mixed Championship
Gold medal – first place	1997
Bronze medal – third place	2019
World Junior Championships
Bronze medal – third place	1992 Oberstdorf
Swedish Junior Championships
Gold medal – first place	1992

Joakim "Jocke" Carlsson (also known as Joakim Mabergs; born 18 August 1972) is a Swedish curler.

== Teams ==
=== Men's ===
Season	Skip	Third	Second	Lead	Alternate	Coach	Events
1991–92	Joakim Carlsson	Mathias Carlsson	Ola Kindlund	Lars Eriksson	Peter Danielsson		SJСС 1992 (gold); WJCC 1992 (bronze)
1994	Per Granqvist	Emil Marklund	Peter Hillbom	Emil Nordkvist	Joakim Carlsson		WJCC 1994 (6th)
1998–99	Peja Lindholm	Tomas Nordin	Magnus Swartling	Peter Narup	Joakim Carlsson	Mats Nyberg, Stefan Hasselborg	ECC 1998 (gold)
1999–00	Peja Lindholm	Tomas Nordin	Magnus Swartling	Peter Narup	Joakim Carlsson	Mats Nyberg, Stefan Hasselborg	ECC 1999 (6th)
2011–12	Lars Goethberg (fourth)	Mathias Mabergs (skip)	Mats Mabergs	Joakim Mabergs	Andreas Rangedal		
2012–13	Lars Goethberg	Andreas Rangedal	Joakim Mabergs	Mats Mabergs	Mathias Mabergs		
2013–14	Lars Goethberg	Mathias Mabergs	Mats Mabergs	Joakim Mabergs	Andreas Rangedal		
2014–15	Lars Goethberg	Mathias Mabergs	Mats Mabergs	Joakim Mabergs	Andreas Rangedal		
2015–16	Lars Goethberg	Mathias Mabergs	Mats Mabergs	Joakim Mabergs	Andreas Rangedal		

=== Mixed ===
Season	Skip	Third	Second	Lead	Alternate	Coach	Events
1996–97	Joakim Carlsson	Christina Carlsson	Mathias Carlsson	Marja Bergström	Daniel Prytz		SMxCC 1997 (gold)
2013–14	Åsa Linderholm (fourth)	Joakim Mabergs	Cathrine Lindahl (skip)	Emil Marklund	Erik Strandqvist		SMxCC 2014 (9th)
2014–15	Åsa Linderholm (fourth)	Joakim Mabergs	Cathrine Lindahl (skip)	Emil Marklund			SMxCC 2015 (5th)
2018–19	Mathias Mabergs	Maria Prytz	Joakim Mabergs	Jessica Ögren		Jens Blixt	SMxCC 2019 (bronze)

== Private life ==
He is from a curling family; his brother Mathias Mabergs (né Carlsson) is a curler and coach
