= 2005 World Men's Curling Championship =

- Host city: Victoria, British Columbia
- Arena: Save on Foods Memorial Centre
- Dates: April 2–10, 2005
- Winner: Canada
- Curling club: Granite CC, Edmonton, Alberta
- Skip: Randy Ferbey
- Fourth: David Nedohin
- Second: Scott Pfeifer
- Lead: Marcel Rocque
- Alternate: Dan Holowaychuk
- Coach: Brian Moore
- Finalist: Scotland (David Murdoch)

The 2005 World Men's Curling Championship (branded as 2005 Ford World Men's Curling Championship for sponsorship reasons) was held from April 2–10, 2005 at the new Save-on-Foods Memorial Centre in Victoria, British Columbia. The tournament was the first since the 1988 event that was held separately from the 2005 World Women's Curling Championship (held in Paisley, Scotland in March 2005). The winner was Randy Ferbey and his team from Canada. Ferbey won his fourth world championship, the rest of his team won their third. As a country, it was Canada's 29th World Championship. Scotland won silver, and Germany bronze.

For the first time ever, the World championships used the page playoff system where the top four teams with the best records at the end of round-robin play meet in the playoff rounds.

== Teams ==
One reason for the separation of the men's and women's tournaments was to allow for an expansion from 10 to 12 teams. This expansion was deemed appropriate because more countries are now producing competitive rinks, particularly in Europe but also including Japan and even New Zealand. Teams included 3 time World Champion Randy Ferbey of Canada, 2002 Silver medallist Pål Trulsen of Norway, 2001 Silver medallist Andreas Schwaller of Switzerland, 1997 Silver medallist Andy Kapp of Germany, 2 time World bronze medallist Markku Uusipaavalniemi of Finland, 1993 bronze medallist Pete Fenson of the United States, 7 time World Championship participant Hugh Millikin of Australia, 3 time participant Sean Becker of New Zealand, 2 time participant Johnny Frederiksen of Denmark and making their first appearances were Stefano Ferronato's team from Italy, David Murdoch's team from Scotland and Eric Carlsén's team from Sweden.

Australia	Canada	Denmark
Sydney Harbour CC Fourth: Ian Palangio; Skip: Hugh Millikin; Second: John Theriault; Lead: Stephen Johns; Alternate: Stephen Hewitt	Granite CC, Edmonton Fourth: David Nedohin; Skip: Randy Ferbey; Second: Scott Pfeifer; Lead: Marcel Rocque; Alternate: Dan Holowaychuk	Hvidovre CC Skip: Johnny Frederiksen; Third: Lars Vilandt; Second: Kenneth Hertsdahl; Lead: Bo Jensen; Alternate: Ivan Frederiksen
Finland	Germany	Italy
Oulunkylä Curlinghalli, Helsinki Skip: Markku Uusipaavalniemi; Third: Wille Mäkelä; Second: Kalle Kiiskinen; Lead: Teemu Salo; Alternate: Perttu Piilo	CC Füssen Skip: Andy Kapp; Third: Uli Kapp; Second: Oliver Axnick; Lead: Holger Höhne; Alternate: Andreas Kempf	CC Dolomiti, Cortina d'Ampezzo Skip: Stefano Ferronato; Third: Fabio Alvera; Second: Marco Mariani; Lead: Alessandro Zisa; Alternate: Joel Retornaz
New Zealand	Norway	Scotland
Ranfurly CC Skip: Sean Becker; Third: Hans Frauenlob; Second: Dan Mustapic; Lead: Lorne De Pape; Alternate: Warren Dobson	Stabekk CC, Oslo Skip: Pål Trulsen; Third: Lars Vågberg; Second: Flemming Davanger; Lead: Bent Ånund Ramsfjell; Alternate: Niels Siggaard Andersen	Lockerbie CC Skip: David Murdoch; Third: Craig Wilson; Second: Neil Murdoch; Lead: Euan Byers; Alternate: Ewan MacDonald
Sweden	Switzerland	United States
Härnösands CK, Härnösand Skip: Eric Carlsén; Third: Andreas Prytz; Second: Daniel Prytz; Lead: Patric Håkansson; Alternate: Mathias Carlsson	Baden Regio-Privera CC Skip: Andreas Schwaller; Third: Markus Eggler; Second: Marco Ramstein; Lead: Christof Schwaller; Alternate: Stefan Karnusian	Bemidji CC, Minnesota Skip: Pete Fenson; Third: Shawn Rojeski; Second: Joe Polo; Lead: John Shuster; Fifth: Scott Baird

== Round-robin standings ==
Final round-robin standings

Key
Teams to playoffs
Teams to tiebreaker

Country	Skip	W	L	PF	PA	Ends Won	Ends Lost	Blank Ends	Stolen Ends	Shot Pct.
Scotland	David Murdoch	8	3	71	62	46	43	16	7	82%
Germany	Andy Kapp	8	3	74	62	44	53	16	10	80%
Norway	Pål Trulsen	8	3	81	55	46	39	17	11	83%
Canada	Randy Ferbey	8	3	85	60	50	42	11	13	86%
Finland	Markku Uusipaavalniemi	8	3	78	59	50	52	16	11	81%
United States	Pete Fenson	8	3	79	66	49	45	18	10	84%
Switzerland	Andreas Schwaller	6	5	67	64	49	44	15	11	81%
New Zealand	Sean Becker	5	6	62	71	47	53	15	5	80%
Sweden	Eric Carlsén	3	8	63	73	41	46	14	8	77%
Australia	Hugh Millikin	2	9	60	78	45	49	14	9	78%
Denmark	Johnny Frederiksen	1	10	59	88	44	45	13	11	75%
Italy	Stefano Ferronato	1	10	55	92	39	50	15	7	77%

To first break the massive 6-way tie at 8-3, the two teams with the best record against the other teams involved (Scotland and Germany) were given automatic playoff spots. The other teams were ranked based on their record against each other, or if that didn't break the tie, a draw to the button which occurred before the tournament began. These other four teams then played tie-breakers to determine the other 2 playoff spots. The winning teams of the tiebreakers should match up in a 3vs4 game to determine the other semi finalist

== Round-robin results ==
=== Draw 1 ===
April 2, 11:00

Sheet A	1	2	3	4	5	6	7	8	9	10	Final
United States (Fenson)	2	0	0	0	2	0	1	0	1	1	7
Australia (Millikin)	0	0	2	2	0	1	0	1	0	0	6

Sheet B	1	2	3	4	5	6	7	8	9	10	Final
New Zealand (Becker)	0	3	0	1	0	2	0	0	2	0	8
Sweden (Carlsén)	1	0	0	0	1	0	1	1	0	1	5

Sheet C	1	2	3	4	5	6	7	8	9	10	Final
Germany (Kapp)	2	0	0	1	0	0	4	0	3	X	10
Canada (Ferbey)	0	1	0	0	1	2	0	1	0	X	5

Sheet D	1	2	3	4	5	6	7	8	9	10	Final
Denmark (Frederiksen)	0	0	0	0	0	1	0	1	0	X	2
Switzerland (Schwaller)	1	1	1	1	0	0	1	0	2	X	7

=== Draw 2 ===
April 2, 18:30

Sheet A	1	2	3	4	5	6	7	8	9	10	Final
Canada (Ferbey)	0	3	1	0	2	0	2	0	1	1	10
New Zealand (Becker)	1	0	0	1	0	1	0	2	0	0	5

Sheet B	1	2	3	4	5	6	7	8	9	10	Final
Finland (Uusipaavalniemi)	1	0	3	0	0	0	2	2	0	1	9
Italy (Ferronato)	0	2	0	1	1	0	0	0	1	0	5

Sheet C	1	2	3	4	5	6	7	8	9	10	Final
Norway (Trulsen)	0	1	0	1	0	0	2	0	0	1	5
Scotland (Murdoch)	0	0	3	0	0	2	0	1	1	0	7

Sheet D	1	2	3	4	5	6	7	8	9	10	Final
Germany (Kapp)	1	0	0	2	0	1	0	1	0	1	6
Sweden (Carlsén)	0	0	2	0	2	0	0	0	1	0	5

=== Draw 3 ===
April 3, 09:30

Sheet B	1	2	3	4	5	6	7	8	9	10	Final
Switzerland (Schwaller)	0	0	0	2	0	1	0	2	0	X	5
United States (Fenson)	0	1	3	0	3	0	1	0	1	X	9

Sheet C	1	2	3	4	5	6	7	8	9	10	Final
Denmark (Frederiksen)	2	0	1	0	1	1	0	1	0	0	6
Australia (Millikin)	0	1	0	2	0	0	2	0	1	1	7

=== Draw 4 ===
April 3, 14:00

Sheet A	1	2	3	4	5	6	7	8	9	10	Final
Italy (Ferronato)	0	0	2	0	0	1	1	0	X	X	4
Norway (Trulsen)	1	2	0	4	0	0	0	2	X	X	9

Sheet B	1	2	3	4	5	6	7	8	9	10	Final
Sweden (Carlsén)	0	0	1	0	0	0	X	X	X	X	1
Canada (Ferbey)	1	1	0	3	1	3	X	X	X	X	9

Sheet C	1	2	3	4	5	6	7	8	9	10	Final
New Zealand (Becker)	0	0	0	0	2	0	0	1	0	2	5
Germany (Kapp)	0	1	1	1	0	0	0	0	1	0	4

Sheet D	1	2	3	4	5	6	7	8	9	10	Final
Finland (Uusipaavalniemi)	1	0	1	0	1	0	1	0	1	0	5
Scotland (Murdoch)	0	2	0	0	0	2	0	1	0	1	6

=== Draw 5 ===
April 3, 18:30

Sheet A	1	2	3	4	5	6	7	8	9	10	Final
Australia (Millikin)	0	1	0	0	2	0	0	2	0	0	5
Switzerland (Schwaller)	0	0	1	2	0	1	1	0	0	1	6

Sheet B	1	2	3	4	5	6	7	8	9	10	Final
Norway (Trulsen)	0	0	4	0	0	1	0	2	0	1	8
Finland (Uusipaavalniemi)	0	1	0	0	1	0	1	0	2	0	5

Sheet C	1	2	3	4	5	6	7	8	9	10	Final
Scotland (Murdoch)	3	3	0	3	0	1	X	X	X	X	10
Italy (Ferronato)	0	0	1	0	1	0	X	X	0	0	2

Sheet D	1	2	3	4	5	6	7	8	9	10	Final
United States (Fenson)	0	2	2	1	0	0	0	1	0	1	7
Denmark (Frederiksen)	1	0	0	0	2	0	1	0	2	0	6

=== Draw 6 ===
April 4, 09:00

Sheet A	1	2	3	4	5	6	7	8	9	10	Final
Denmark (Frederiksen)	0	1	0	1	0	1	1	0	X	X	4
Germany (Kapp)	4	0	3	0	2	0	0	1	X	X	10

Sheet B	1	2	3	4	5	6	7	8	9	10	Final
Switzerland (Schwaller)	0	0	1	0	1	0	1	0	0	0	3
New Zealand (Becker)	0	0	0	2	0	2	0	2	0	1	7

Sheet C	1	2	3	4	5	6	7	8	9	10	Final
United States (Fenson)	0	0	0	2	0	1	0	2	0	3	8
Canada (Ferbey)	0	0	3	0	2	0	1	0	1	0	7

Sheet D	1	2	3	4	5	6	7	8	9	10	Final
Australia (Millikin)	0	1	0	1	0	0	0	X	X	X	2
Sweden (Carlsén)	3	0	0	0	2	3	2	X	X	X	10

=== Draw 7 ===
April 4, 15:00

Sheet A	1	2	3	4	5	6	7	8	9	10	Final
New Zealand (Becker)	0	0	2	0	2	0	2	0	0	0	6
Scotland (Murdoch)	0	1	0	2	0	2	0	2	1	1	9

Sheet B	1	2	3	4	5	6	7	8	9	10	Final
Germany (Kapp)	0	2	0	0	0	1	0	1	1	2	7
Italy (Ferronato)	2	0	0	0	1	0	2	0	0	0	5

Sheet C	1	2	3	4	5	6	7	8	9	10	Final
Sweden (Carlsén)	0	0	0	0	1	0	1	0	1	X	3
Norway (Trulsen)	0	2	3	0	0	1	0	1	0	X	7

Sheet D	1	2	3	4	5	6	7	8	9	10	Final
Canada (Ferbey)	0	2	1	0	2	0	2	0	0	1	8
Finland (Uusipaavalniemi)	1	0	0	1	0	2	0	2	0	0	6

=== Draw 8 ===
April 4, 19:30

Sheet A	1	2	3	4	5	6	7	8	9	10	Final
Finland (Uusipaavalniemi)	0	1	0	2	0	0	2	1	0	1	7
United States (Fenson)	2	0	1	0	1	0	0	0	1	0	5

Sheet B	1	2	3	4	5	6	7	8	9	10	Final
Norway (Trulsen)	0	2	0	0	1	0	3	0	1	2	9
Australia (Millikin)	1	0	1	0	0	2	0	1	0	0	5

Sheet C	1	2	3	4	5	6	7	8	9	10	Final
Italy (Ferronato)	0	0	0	3	0	1	0	0	X	X	4
Denmark (Frederiksen)	3	2	0	0	0	0	2	3	X	X	10

Sheet D	1	2	3	4	5	6	7	8	9	10	Final
Scotland (Murdoch)	0	1	0	2	0	0	0	1	0	X	4
Switzerland (Schwaller)	1	0	2	0	1	1	0	0	4	X	9

=== Draw 9 ===
April 5, 09:00

Sheet A	1	2	3	4	5	6	7	8	9	10	11	Final
Italy (Ferronato)	0	1	0	0	0	2	0	0	0	1	0	4
Australia (Millikin)	0	0	2	0	0	0	1	0	1	0	1	5

Sheet B	1	2	3	4	5	6	7	8	9	10	Final
Scotland (Murdoch)	1	0	1	0	1	0	2	0	0	0	5
United States (Fenson)	0	1	0	2	0	2	0	4	0	1	10

Sheet C	1	2	3	4	5	6	7	8	9	10	11	Final
Finland (Uusipaavalniemi)	0	1	0	2	0	0	0	2	0	0	1	6
Switzerland (Schwaller)	1	0	2	0	0	0	1	0	0	1	0	5

Sheet D	1	2	3	4	5	6	7	8	9	10	Final
Norway (Trulsen)	0	0	3	0	3	0	2	0	4	X	12
Denmark (Frederiksen)	0	2	0	2	0	1	0	1	0	X	6

=== Draw 10 ===
April 5, 15:00

Sheet A	1	2	3	4	5	6	7	8	9	10	Final
Switzerland (Schwaller)	0	2	0	0	1	1	0	2	1	1	8
Sweden (Carlsén)	2	0	2	1	0	0	1	0	0	0	6

Sheet B	1	2	3	4	5	6	7	8	9	10	Final
Denmark (Frederiksen)	0	2	0	1	0	0	1	0	0	X	4
Canada (Ferbey)	3	0	2	0	0	1	0	0	3	X	9

Sheet C	1	2	3	4	5	6	7	8	9	10	Final
Australia (Millikin)	1	0	3	0	2	0	0	1	0	0	7
New Zealand (Becker)	0	1	0	1	0	3	0	0	2	1	8

Sheet D	1	2	3	4	5	6	7	8	9	10	11	Final
United States (Fenson)	0	0	0	1	0	0	1	0	1	2	0	5
Germany (Kapp)	0	0	1	0	1	2	0	1	0	0	1	6

=== Draw 11 ===
April 5, 19:30

Sheet A	1	2	3	4	5	6	7	8	9	10	Final
Canada (Ferbey)	0	1	0	1	0	0	1	0	1	0	4
Norway (Trulsen)	0	0	1	0	1	1	0	1	0	1	5

Sheet B	1	2	3	4	5	6	7	8	9	10	Final
Sweden (Carlsén)	0	1	1	0	0	2	0	0	2	0	6
Finland (Uusipaavalniemi)	2	0	0	2	1	0	2	0	0	1	8

Sheet C	1	2	3	4	5	6	7	8	9	10	Final
Germany (Kapp)	0	1	0	1	0	0	0	0	2	0	4
Scotland (Murdoch)	2	0	1	0	0	2	1	0	0	1	7

Sheet D	1	2	3	4	5	6	7	8	9	10	Final
New Zealand (Becker)	1	0	0	0	0	1	0	1	1	0	4
Italy (Ferronato)	0	0	1	1	0	0	3	0	0	1	6

=== Draw 12 ===
April 6, 09:00

Sheet A	1	2	3	4	5	6	7	8	9	10	Final
Germany (Kapp)	0	0	0	1	0	1	0	2	0	X	4
Finland (Uusipaavalniemi)	0	1	1	0	2	0	3	0	2	X	9

Sheet B	1	2	3	4	5	6	7	8	9	10	Final
New Zealand (Becker)	0	1	0	0	0	1	X	X	X	X	2
Norway (Trulsen)	1	0	1	4	3	0	X	X	X	X	9

Sheet C	1	2	3	4	5	6	7	8	9	10	Final
Canada (Ferbey)	0	0	1	0	2	0	3	3	0	1	10
Italy (Ferronato)	1	1	0	1	0	2	0	0	2	0	7

Sheet D	1	2	3	4	5	6	7	8	9	10	11	Final
Sweden (Carlsén)	0	0	1	0	1	0	0	1	0	1	0	4
Scotland (Murdoch)	0	0	0	1	0	1	1	0	1	0	1	5

=== Draw 13 ===
April 6, 15:00

Sheet A	1	2	3	4	5	6	7	8	9	10	Final
Scotland (Murdoch)	1	0	0	1	0	4	0	0	2	X	8
Denmark (Frederiksen)	0	0	2	0	1	0	0	1	0	X	4

Sheet B	1	2	3	4	5	6	7	8	9	10	11	Final
Italy (Ferronato)	1	0	0	1	1	0	0	1	0	1	0	5
Switzerland (Schwaller)	0	1	0	0	0	1	1	0	2	0	2	7

Sheet C	1	2	3	4	5	6	7	8	9	10	Final
Norway (Trulsen)	0	0	0	1	1	1	0	2	0	1	6
United States (Fenson)	1	0	0	0	0	0	2	0	0	0	3

Sheet D	1	2	3	4	5	6	7	8	9	10	Final
Finland (Uusipaavalniemi)	0	2	0	0	0	0	1	0	2	1	6
Australia (Millikin)	1	0	2	0	0	1	0	1	0	0	5

=== Draw 14 ===
April 6, 19:30

Sheet A	1	2	3	4	5	6	7	8	9	10	11	Final
United States (Fenson)	0	0	1	1	0	2	0	1	1	0	1	7
New Zealand (Becker)	0	0	0	0	2	0	1	0	0	3	0	6

Sheet B	1	2	3	4	5	6	7	8	9	10	Final
Australia (Millikin)	0	3	0	1	0	0	1	0	1	0	6
Germany (Kapp)	1	0	3	0	1	0	0	1	0	2	8

Sheet C	1	2	3	4	5	6	7	8	9	10	Final
Denmark (Frederiksen)	1	0	1	1	0	0	1	0	1	0	5
Sweden (Carlsén)	0	3	0	0	1	0	0	1	0	1	6

Sheet D	1	2	3	4	5	6	7	8	9	10	Final
Switzerland (Schwaller)	0	1	0	0	0	0	1	0	1	X	3
Canada (Ferbey)	1	0	1	0	3	1	0	1	0	X	7

=== Draw 15 ===
April 7, 09:00

Sheet A	1	2	3	4	5	6	7	8	9	10	Final
Sweden (Carlsén)	0	0	1	0	3	0	1	0	5	1	11
Italy (Ferronato)	0	1	0	2	0	1	0	3	0	0	7

Sheet B	1	2	3	4	5	6	7	8	9	10	Final
Canada (Ferbey)	0	1	0	2	0	0	0	2	0	3	8
Scotland (Murdoch)	2	0	1	0	0	0	1	0	0	0	4

Sheet C	1	2	3	4	5	6	7	8	9	10	Final
New Zealand (Becker)	0	0	2	0	0	0	1	0	X	X	3
Finland (Uusipaavalniemi)	0	1	0	3	1	1	0	3	X	X	9

Sheet D	1	2	3	4	5	6	7	8	9	10	Final
Germany (Kapp)	0	0	2	1	0	2	0	2	1	0	8
Norway (Trulsen)	0	1	0	0	2	0	2	0	0	0	5

=== Draw 16 ===
April 7, 15:00

Sheet A	1	2	3	4	5	6	7	8	9	10	Final
Australia (Millikin)	0	1	0	1	0	2	1	1	1	0	7
Canada (Ferbey)	2	0	2	0	1	0	0	0	0	3	8

Sheet B	1	2	3	4	5	6	7	8	9	10	11	Final
United States (Fenson)	0	0	0	3	0	0	1	0	2	0	3	9
Sweden (Carlsén)	2	0	1	0	0	0	0	1	0	2	0	6

Sheet C	1	2	3	4	5	6	7	8	9	10	Final
Switzerland (Schwaller)	0	1	0	1	2	0	1	0	1	0	6
Germany (Kapp)	1	0	2	0	0	2	0	1	0	1	7

Sheet D	1	2	3	4	5	6	7	8	9	10	Final
Denmark (Frederiksen)	1	0	1	0	2	1	0	1	1	0	7
New Zealand (Becker)	0	2	0	5	0	0	1	0	0	0	8

=== Draw 17 ===
April 7, 19:30

Sheet A	1	2	3	4	5	6	7	8	9	10	Final
Norway (Trulsen)	1	0	3	0	1	0	1	0	0	0	6
Switzerland (Schwaller)	0	1	0	3	0	2	0	0	0	2	8

Sheet B	1	2	3	4	5	6	7	8	9	10	Final
Finland (Uusipaavalniemi)	2	2	0	0	0	2	0	0	2	0	8
Denmark (Frederiksen)	0	0	2	1	1	0	1	0	0	0	5

Sheet C	1	2	3	4	5	6	7	8	9	10	Final
Scotland (Murdoch)	0	2	0	1	0	2	0	0	1	0	6
Australia (Millikin)	1	0	1	0	1	0	1	0	0	1	5

Sheet D	1	2	3	4	5	6	7	8	9	10	Final
Italy (Ferronato)	1	0	1	0	0	2	0	2	0	0	6
United States (Fenson)	0	2	0	0	1	0	2	0	3	2	10

== Tiebreaker ==
April 8, 12:00

Sheet A	1	2	3	4	5	6	7	8	9	10	Final
Norway (Trulsen)	3	0	0	2	0	1	0	0	2	2	10
United States (Fenson)	0	1	2	0	2	0	1	0	0	0	6

Player percentages
Norway		United States	
Bent Ramsfjell	88%	John Shuster	93%
Flemming Davanger	80%	Joe Polo	80%
Lars Vågberg	76%	Shawn Rojeski	68%
Pål Trulsen	78%	Pete Fenson	61%
Total	80%	Total	88%

Sheet C	1	2	3	4	5	6	7	8	9	10	Final
Finland (Uusipaavalniemi)	1	0	1	1	0	1	0	0	1	X	5
Canada (Ferbey)	0	2	0	0	3	0	1	3	0	X	9

Player percentages
Finland		Canada	
Teemu Salo	88%	Marcel Rocque	91%
Kalle Kiiskinen	68%	Scott Pfeifer	89%
Wille Mäkelä	67%	Randy Ferbey	89%
Markku Uusipaavalniemi	67%	David Nedohin	82%
Total	72%	Total	88%

== Playoffs ==
=== Brackets ===
Page playoffs
1	Scotland	8
2	Germany	7
3	Norway	6
4	Canada	7

Semifinal
2	Germany	6
4	Canada	8

Final
1	Scotland	4
4	Canada	11

=== 3 vs. 4 game ===
April 8, 18:00

Sheet B	1	2	3	4	5	6	7	8	9	10	Final
Norway (Trulsen)	1	1	0	1	0	2	0	1	0	0	6
Canada (Ferbey)	0	0	2	0	1	0	1	0	2	1	7

Player percentages
Norway		Canada	
Bent Ramsfjell	88%	Marcel Rocque	98%
Flemming Davanger	81%	Scott Pfeifer	79%
Lars Vågberg	88%	Randy Ferbey	85%
Pål Trulsen	75%	David Nedohin	91%
Total	83%	Total	88%

=== 1 vs. 2 game ===
April 8, 22:30

Sheet B	1	2	3	4	5	6	7	8	9	10	Final
Germany (Kapp)	0	2	0	0	0	2	0	0	2	1	7
Scotland (Murdoch)	2	0	2	1	0	0	2	1	0	0	8

Player percentages
Germany		Scotland	
Holger Höhne	91%	Euan Byers	73%
Oliver Axnick	89%	Neil Murdoch	83%
Uli Kapp	70%	Craig Wilson	80%
Andy Kapp	79%	David Murdoch	81%
Total	82%	Total	79%

=== Semi-final ===
April 9, 14:00

Sheet B	1	2	3	4	5	6	7	8	9	10	Final
Canada (Ferbey)	2	0	0	0	2	0	1	0	0	3	8
Germany (Kapp)	0	2	0	1	0	1	0	1	1	0	6

Player percentages
Germany		Canada	
Andreas Kempf	84%	Marcel Rocque	88%
Oliver Axnick	76%	Scott Pfeifer	81%
Uli Kapp	76%	Randy Ferbey	86%
Andy Kapp	81%	David Nedohin	79%
Total	79%	Total	84%

=== Final ===
April 10, 12:30

Sheet B	1	2	3	4	5	6	7	8	9	10	Final
Scotland (Murdoch)	0	2	0	0	1	0	0	1	X	X	4
Canada (Ferbey)	1	0	5	0	0	0	5	0	X	X	11

Player percentages
Scotland		Canada	
Euan Byers	86%	Marcel Rocque	93%
Neil Murdoch	83%	Scott Pfeifer	84%
Craig Wilson	82%	Randy Ferbey	89%
David Murdoch	67%	David Nedohin	95%
Total	79%	Total	90%

2005 Ford World Curling Championship
(Canada)
Canada
29th title

== Round-robin player percentages ==
Leads	%	Seconds	%	Thirds	%	Skips	%
(Canada) Marcel Rocque	91	(United States) Joe Polo	85	(Canada) Randy Ferbey	86	(Norway) Pål Trulsen	84
(Switzerland) Christof Schwaller	89	(Canada) Scott Pfeifer	84	(Germany) Uli Kapp	81	(Canada) David Nedohin	84
(United States) John Shuster	88	(New Zealand) Dan Mustapic	83	(Scotland) Craig Wilson	81	(Scotland) David Murdoch	83
(Norway) Bent Ånund Ramsfjell	86	(Finland) Kalle Kiiskinen	81	(United States) Shawn Rojeski	80	(United States) Pete Fenson	79
(Sweden) Patric Håkansson	85	(Norway) Flemming Davanger	81	(Norway) Lars Vågberg	80	(Switzerland) Andreas Schwaller	79
