= Mats Mabergs =

Swedish male curler

- Curler ♂
- Born: 27 February 1962 (age 64)

Team
- Curling club: Malung CC, Malung

Curling career
- Member Association: Sweden
Medal record
Curling

Bygg Mats Birger Mabergs (born 27 February 1962) is a Swedish curler and curling coach.

As a coach of Swedish wheelchair curling team he participated in 2014 Winter Paralympics.

== Teams ==
=== Men's ===
Season	Skip	Third	Second	Lead	Alternate
2011–12	Lars Goethberg (fourth)	Mathias Mabergs (skip)	Mats Mabergs	Joakim Mabergs	Andreas Rangedal
2012–13	Lars Goethberg	Andreas Rangedal	Joakim Mabergs	Mats Mabergs	Mathias Mabergs
2013–14	Lars Goethberg	Mathias Mabergs	Mats Mabergs	Joakim Mabergs	Andreas Rangedal
2014–15	Lars Goethberg	Mathias Mabergs	Mats Mabergs	Joakim Mabergs	Andreas Rangedal
2015–16	Lars Goethberg	Mathias Mabergs	Mats Mabergs	Joakim Mabergs	Andreas Rangedal

=== Mixed ===
Season	Skip	Third	Second	Lead	Events
2008–09	Mats Mabergs	Monika Mabergs	Peter Ahlberg	Anna Cervin	SMxCC 2009 (9th)
2012–13	Patric Mabergs	Sofia Mabergs	Mats Mabergs	Monika Mabergs	SMxCC 2013 (???th)
2013–14	Mats Mabergs	Susanne Patz	Flemming Patz	Monika Mabergs	SMxCC 2014 (5th)
2014–15	Mats Mabergs	Susanne Patz	Flemming Patz	Monika Mabergs	SMxCC 2015 (4th)
2015–16	Mats Mabergs	Susanne Patz	Flemming Patz	Monika Mabergs	SMxCC 2016 (13th)

== Record as a coach of national teams ==
Year	Tournament, event	National team	Place
2013	2013 World Wheelchair Curling Championship	Sweden (wheelchair)	2nd place, silver medalist(s)
2014	2014 Winter Paralympics	Sweden (wheelchair)	7
