= Mia Boman =

Swedish female curler and coach

- Curler ♀
- Born: Maria Zackrisson; 13 June 1975 (age 51); Sveg, Sweden

Team
- Curling club: Svegs CK, Sveg

Curling career
- Member Association: Sweden
- European Championship: 1 (1999)
- Other appearances: World Junior Championships: 4 (1993, 1994, 1995, 1996)
Medal record
Curling
European Championships
Silver medal – second place	1999 Chamonix
Swedish Women's Championship
Gold medal – first place	1999
World Junior Championships
Silver medal – second place	1995 Perth
Bronze medal – third place	1994 Sofia
Bronze medal – third place	1996 Red Deer

Maria "Mia" Boman (born 13 June 1975 in Sveg, Sweden as Maria "Mia" Zackrisson) is a Swedish curler and curling coach.

She is a 1999 European silver medallist and 1999 Swedish women's champion curler.

As a coach of Swedish wheelchair curling team she participated in 2018 Winter Paralympics.

== Teams ==
Season	Skip	Third	Second	Lead	Alternate	Coach	Events
1992–93	Ulrika Bergman (fourth)	Margaretha Lindahl (skip)	Anna Bergström	Elenor Mattsson	Maria "Mia" Zackrisson		WJCC 1993 (5th)
1993–94	Ulrika Bergman (fourth)	Margaretha Lindahl (skip)	Anna Bergström	Maria "Mia" Zackrisson	Maria Engholm (WJCC)		SJCC 1994 (gold); WJCC 1994 (bronze)
1994–95	Ulrika Bergman (fourth)	Margaretha Lindahl (skip)	Anna Bergström	Maria "Mia" Zackrisson	Maria Engholm (WJCC)		SJCC 1995 (gold); WJCC 1995 (silver)
1995–96	Ulrika Bergman (fourth)	Margaretha Lindahl (skip)	Maria "Mia" Zackrisson	Linda Kjerr	Anna Blom		SJCC 1996 (gold); WJCC 1996 (bronze)
1998–99	Margaretha Lindahl	Ulrika Bergman	Anna Bergström	Maria "Mia" Zackrisson			SWCC 1999 (gold)
1999–00	Margaretha Lindahl	Ulrika Bergman	Anna Bergström	Maria "Mia" Zackrisson	Maria Engholm	Lars Carlsson, Stefan Hasselborg	ECC 1999 (silver)
2009–10	Kajsa Bergström	Mia Boman	Anki Nordqvist	Jenny Hammarström			

== Record as a coach of national teams ==
Year	Tournament, event	National team	Place
2015	2015 World Wheelchair B Curling Championship	Sweden (wheelchair)	3rd place, bronze medalist(s)
2016	2016 World Wheelchair B Curling Championship	Sweden (wheelchair)	7
2018	2018 Winter Paralympics	Sweden (wheelchair)	10
