= Anette Norberg =

Swedish curler (born 1966)

- Curler
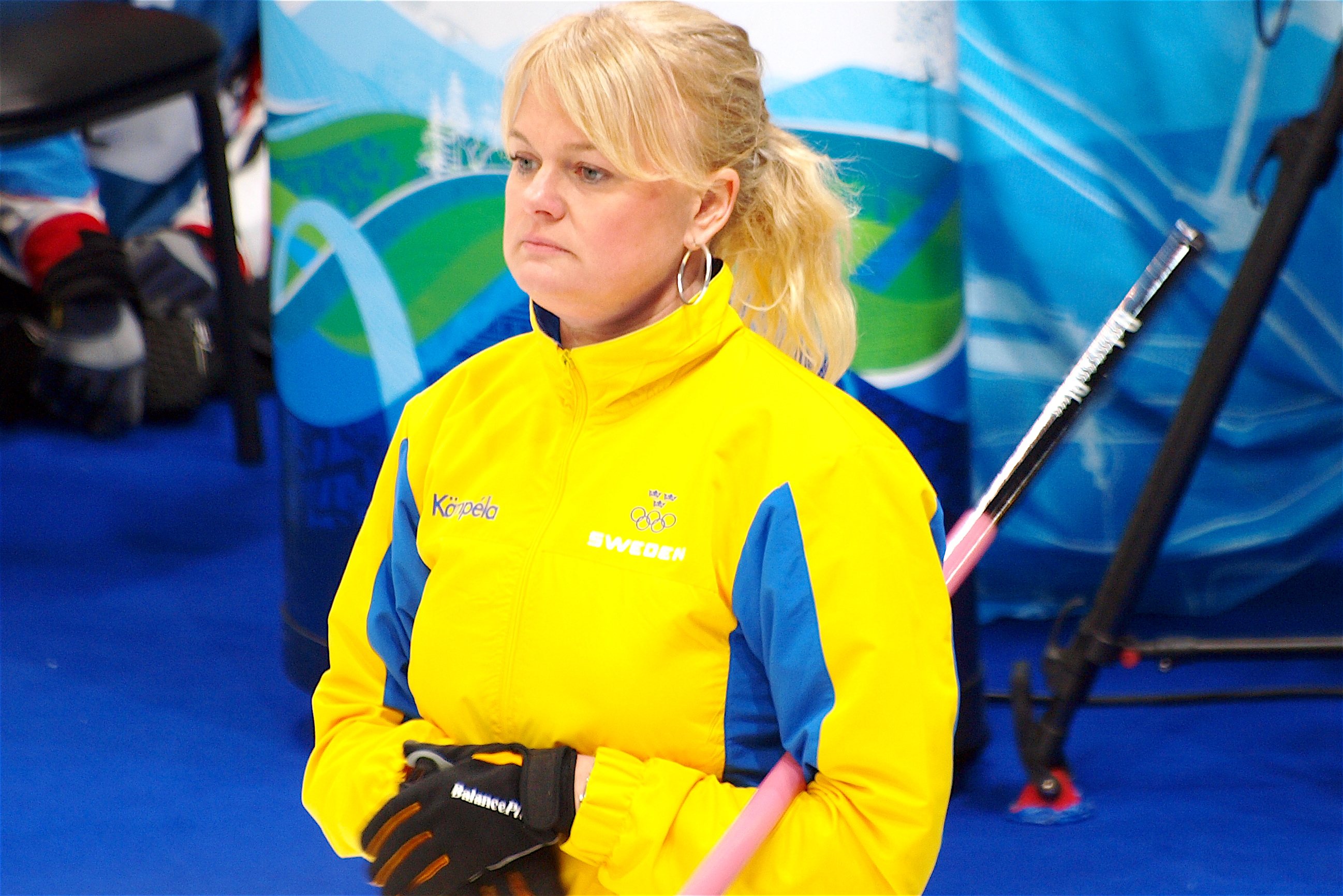
- Norberg at the 2010 Winter Olympics in Vancouver, British Columbia, Canada
- Other names: Anette Charlotte Norberg
- Born: 12 November 1966 (age 60); Härnösand, Sweden
- Height: 174 cm (5 ft 9 in)

Curling career
- World Championship: 11 (1988, 1989, 1991, 2001, 2003, 2004, 2005, 2006, 2007, 2009, 2011)
- European Championship: 15 (1984, 1987, 1988, 1989, 1991, 1994, 1998, 2001, 2002, 2003, 2004, 2005, 2007, 2008, 2009)
- World Senior Curling Championship: 3 (2018, 2019, 2024)
- Olympic: 2 (2006, 2010)
Medal record
Curling
Representing Sweden
Olympic Games
Gold medal – first place	2006 Turin
Gold medal – first place	2010 Vancouver
Silver medal – second place	1988 Calgary (demonstration)
World Championships
Gold medal – first place	2005 Paisley
Gold medal – first place	2006 Grande Prairie
Gold medal – first place	2011 Esbjerg
Silver medal – second place	2001 Lausanne
Silver medal – second place	2009 Gangneung
Bronze medal – third place	1988 Glasgow
Bronze medal – third place	1989 Milwaukee
Bronze medal – third place	1991 Winnipeg
Bronze medal – third place	2003 Winnipeg
European Championships
Gold medal – first place	1988 Perth
Gold medal – first place	2001 Vierumäki
Gold medal – first place	2002 Grindelwald
Gold medal – first place	2003 Courmayeur
Gold medal – first place	2004 Sofia
Gold medal – first place	2005 Garmisch-Partenkirchen
Gold medal – first place	2007 Füssen
Silver medal – second place	1984 Morzine
Silver medal – second place	1987 Oberstdorf
Silver medal – second place	2008 Härnösand
Bronze medal – third place	1989 Engelberg
Bronze medal – third place	1991 Chamonix

Anette Charlotte Norberg (born 12 November 1966) is a Swedish curler from Härnösand.

She and her team were the Olympic women's curling champions in 2006 and 2010. After winning the 2006 Women's Curling tournament in Turin over Mirjam Ott's Swiss team, she led her team to victory for gold over Cheryl Bernard's Canadian team in the 2010 Women's Curling tournament in Vancouver; becoming the first skip in the history of curling to successfully defend an Olympic title.

Her team that retired after the 2010 Olympics (although she herself continued until 2013) is regarded as one of the best women's curling teams in history, and she is often regarded as one of the best female skips in history, particularly after adding yet another world title in 2011 with a new younger team.

== Career ==
Norberg started to curl at the age of ten.

Norberg won seven European Curling Championships (1988, 2001, 2002, 2003, 2004, 2005 and 2007) and three World Curling Championships (2005, 2006 and 2011). She also won silver medal at the 2001 Ford World Curling Championship and bronze medals in 1988, 1989, 1991 and 2003 World Championships. Except when she played at third for Elisabeth Högström in the team that won the 1988 European Championship, Norberg has always played the position of skip. After the retirement of her Olympic team, she put together a new team, with Cecilia Östlund, Sara Carlsson, and Liselotta Lennartsson and won her final third world championship gold medal. Norberg announced her decision to retire in April 2013.

In 1989 she was inducted into the Swedish Curling Hall of Fame. In 2021, she and her Olympic team mates were inducted into the WCF Hall of Fame.

== Television and media appearances ==
In 2006, Norberg appeared in the "Hearts on Fire" music video for Swedish power metal band HammerFall.

Norberg appeared as a contestant in Let's Dance 2013.

== Personal life ==
Norberg is the older sister of fellow curler Cathrine Lindahl. Apart from curling, Norberg was chief actuary at Nordea, and led a division at Folksam. She is currently a consultant at PricewaterhouseCoopers.

Norberg holds a Bachelor of Arts in mathematics from Uppsala University. With her ex husband, she has one daughter, curler Therese Westman, and one son, opera singer Tobias Westman. She has been in a relationship with Kenneth Bergman since 2010.

In September 2014, Norberg revealed that she had been diagnosed with breast cancer in 2013, shortly after she retired. She has since completed treatment, which included chemotherapy and surgery to remove the tumor.

== Teams ==
Season	Skip	Third	Second	Lead
1982–83	Anette Norberg	Carina Nilsson	Louise Marmont	Anna Rindeskog
1984–85	Anette Norberg	Anna Rindeskog	Sofie Marmont	Louise Marmont
1985–86	Anette Norberg	Sofie Marmont	Anna Rindeskog	Louise Marmont
1986–87	Anette Norberg	Carina Westman	Anna Rindeskog	Louise Marmont
1987–88	Anette Norberg	Anna Rindeskog (began season as second)	Sofie Marmont (began season as third)	Louise Marmont
1988 ECC	Elisabeth Högström	Anette Norberg	Monika Jansson	Marie Henriksson
1989 WCC	Anette Norberg	Anna Rindeskog	Sofie Marmont	Louise Marmont
1989–90	Anette Norberg	Anna Rindeskog	Sofie Marmont	Louise Marmont
1990–91	Anette Norberg	Cathrine Norberg	Anna Rindeskog	Helene Granqvist
1991–92	Anette Norberg	Anna Rindeskog	Cathrine Norberg	Helene Granqvist
1994–95	Anette Norberg	Cathrine Norberg	Helena Klange	Helene Granqvist
1998–99	Anette Norberg	Cathrine Norberg	Helena Svensson	Anna Blom
2000–01	Anette Norberg	Cathrine Norberg	Eva Lund	Helena Lingham
2001–02	Anette Norberg	Cathrine Norberg	Eva Lund	Maria Hasselborg
2002–03	Anette Norberg	Eva Lund (began season as second)	Cathrine Norberg (began season as third)	Helena Lingham
2003–04	Anette Norberg	Eva Lund	Cathrine Norberg	Anna Bergström
2004–05	Anette Norberg	Eva Lund	Cathrine Lindahl	Anna Bergström
2005–06	Anette Norberg	Eva Lund	Cathrine Lindahl	Anna Svärd
2006–07	Anette Norberg	Eva Lund	Cathrine Lindahl	Anna Svärd
2007–08	Anette Norberg	Eva Lund	Cathrine Lindahl	Anna Svärd
2008–09	Anette Norberg	Eva Lund	Cathrine Lindahl	Anna Svärd; Margaretha Sigfridsson
2009–10	Anette Norberg	Eva Lund	Cathrine Lindahl	Anna Le Moine
2010–11	Anette Norberg	Cecilia Östlund	Sara Carlsson	Liselotta Lennartsson
2011–12	Anette Norberg	Cecilia Östlund	Sara Carlsson	Liselotta Lennartsson
2012–13	Anette Norberg	Cecilia Östlund	Sabina Kraupp	Sara Carlsson
2015–16	Anette Norberg	Therese Westman	Cathrine Lindahl	Åsa Linderholm
2016–17	Anette Norberg	Therese Westman	Maria Larsson	Tilde Vermelin
2017–18	Anette Norberg	Therese Westman	Johanna Heldin	Tilde Vermelin
2018–19	Anette Norberg	Therese Westman	Johanna Heldin	Tilde Vermelin
