= Mathias Mabergs =

Swedish male curler

- Curler ♂
- Other names: Mathias Carlsson, Mini
- Born: 10 May 1975 (age 51)

Team
- Curling club: Malung CC, Malung, Sundbybergs CK, Sundbyberg

Curling career
- Member Association: Sweden
- World Championship: 1 (2005)
- European Championship: 1 (2008)
- Other appearances: World Junior Championships: 2 (1992, 1995)
Medal record
Curling
Swedish Men's Championship
Gold medal – first place	2008

Mathias "Mini" Mabergs (also known as Mathias Carlsson; born 10 May 1975) is a Swedish curler and curling coach.

== Teams ==
Season	Skip	Third	Second	Lead	Alternate	Coach	Events
1991–92	Joakim Carlsson	Mathias Carlsson	Ola Kindlund	Lars Eriksson	Peter Danielsson		SJСС 1992 (gold); WJCC 1992 (bronze)
1994–95	Henrik Edlund	Fredrik Timan	Peter Hillbom	Emil Nordkvist	Mathias Carlsson		WJCC 1995 (4th)
2004–05	Eric Carlsén	Andreas Prytz	Daniel Prytz	Patric Håkansson	Mathias Carlsson	Fredrik Hallström	WCC 2005 (9th)
2007–08	Mathias Mabergs	Henrik Edlund	Emil Marklund	David Kallin			SMCC 2008 (gold)
2008–09	Henrik Edlund (fourth)	Mathias Mabergs (skip)	Emil Marklund	David Kallin	Andreas Prytz	Thomas Skagersten	ECC 2008 (8th)
2009–10	Mathias Mabergs	Henrik Edlund	Emil Marklund	Emil Nordkvist			
2011–12	Lars Goethberg (fourth)	Mathias Mabergs (skip)	Mats Mabergs	Joakim Mabergs	Andreas Rangedal		
2012–13	Lars Goethberg	Andreas Rangedal	Joakim Mabergs	Mats Mabergs	Mathias Mabergs		
2013–14	Lars Goethberg	Mathias Mabergs	Mats Mabergs	Joakim Mabergs	Andreas Rangedal		
2014–15	Lars Goethberg	Mathias Mabergs	Mats Mabergs	Joakim Mabergs	Andreas Rangedal		
2015–16	Lars Goethberg	Mathias Mabergs	Mats Mabergs	Joakim Mabergs	Andreas Rangedal		

=== Mixed ===
Season	Skip	Third	Second	Lead	Alternate	Coach	Events
1996–97	Joakim Carlsson	Christina Carlsson	Mathias Carlsson	Marja Bergström	Daniel Prytz		SMxCC 1997 (gold)
2014–15	Andreas Prytz	Anna Huhta	Mathias Mabergs	Sara McManus			SMxCC 2015 (silver)
2015–16	Andreas Skoglund	Maria Nilsson	Mathias Mabergs	Maria Prytz			SMxCC 2016 (5th)
2018–19	Mathias Mabergs	Maria Prytz	Joakim Mabergs	Jessica Ögren		Jens Blixt	SMxCC 2019 (bronze)

== Record as a coach of national teams ==
Year	Tournament, event	National team	Place
2004	2004 World Junior Curling Championships	Sweden (junior women)	3rd place, bronze medalist(s)
2014	2014 World Men's Curling Championship	Sweden (men)	2nd place, silver medalist(s)
2015	2015 Winter Universiade	Sweden (students women)	4
2017	2017 World Junior Curling Championships	Sweden (junior women)	1st place, gold medalist(s)
2019	2019 World Mixed Curling Championship	Sweden (mixed)	9

== Private life ==
He is from a curling family; his brother Joakim Mabergs (né Carlsson) is a curler.
