= Eva Lund =

Swedish curler and Olympic gold medalist (born 1971)

- Curler
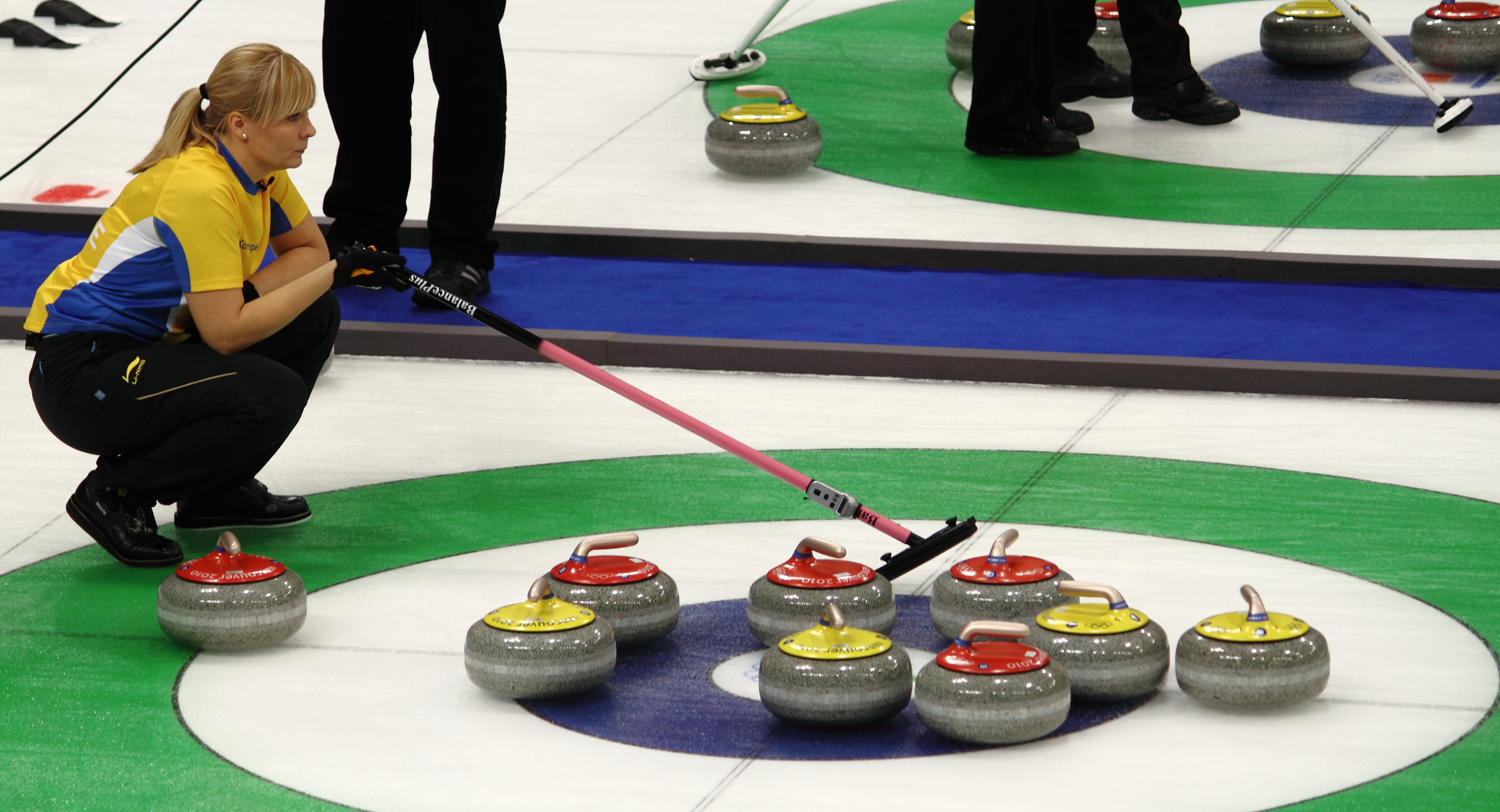
- Lund at the 2010 Winter Olympics
- Born: Eva Eriksson; 1 May 1971 (age 55); Upplands Väsby, Sweden
Medal record
Women's curling
Representing Sweden
Olympic Games
Gold medal – first place	2006 Turin	Women's
Gold medal – first place	2010 Vancouver	Women's
World Championships
Gold medal – first place	2005 Paisley	Women's
Gold medal – first place	2006 Grande Prairie	Women's
Silver medal – second place	2001 Lausanne	Women's
Silver medal – second place	2009 Gangneung	Women's
Bronze medal – third place	2003 Winnipeg	Women's
European Championships
Gold medal – first place	1993 Leukerbad	Women's
Gold medal – first place	2001 Vierumäki	Women's
Gold medal – first place	2002 Grindelwald	Women's
Gold medal – first place	2003 Courmayeur	Women's
Gold medal – first place	2004 Sofia	Women's
Gold medal – first place	2005 Garmisch-Partenkirchen	Women's
Gold medal – first place	2007 Füssen	Women's
Silver medal – second place	2008 Härnösand	Women's
World Junior Championships
Gold medal – first place	1991 Glasgow	Women's
Silver medal – second place	1990 Portage la Prairie	Women's
Bronze medal – third place	1992 Oberstdorf	Women's

Eva Lund (born 1 May 1971) is a Swedish curler. 5 ft 7 in (170 cm), 146 lb (10 st 6 lb, 66 kg).

Born in Stockholm, Sweden, as Eva Eriksson, she lives in Upplands Väsby, Stockholm, with her husband and Swedish national curling coach Stefan Lund and her son Adam and daughter Anna. Eva Lund trains with the Härnösands CK club, and when not curling is a regulatory affairs project manager.

Eva Lund played third for Anette Norberg's team, and has won many international titles, including two golds in the Olympic Winter Games 2006 in Turin and 2010 in Vancouver. In the world championships she has a gold from 2005 and 2006, a silver from 2001 and a bronze from 2003. She has won gold in the European championships in 2001, 2003, 2004, 2005 and 2007. She also has a gold from 1993 as a reserve. And in the Elite series she has won gold in 2001, 2003, 2004, 2005 and 2006, with bronze from 1993, 1998, and 1999. She recently retired.

In 2003 she was inducted into the Swedish Curling Hall of Fame.
