= Louise Marmont =

Swedish curler

- Curler
- Other names: Anna Louise Marmont
- Born: 22 May 1967 (age 59); Jönköping, Sweden
Medal record
Women's curling
Representing Sweden
Olympic Games
Bronze medal – third place	1998 Nagano
World Championships
Gold medal – first place	1992 Garmisch-Partenkirchen
Gold medal – first place	1995 Brandon
Gold medal – first place	1998 Kamloops
Gold medal – first place	1999 Saint John
Bronze medal – third place	1988 Glasgow
Bronze medal – third place	1989 Milwaukee
Bronze medal – third place	1993 Geneva
Bronze medal – third place	1994 Oberstdorf
European Championships
Gold medal – first place	1992 Perth
Gold medal – first place	1993 Leukerbad
Gold medal – first place	1997 Füssen
Gold medal – first place	2000 Oberstdorf
Silver medal – second place	1984 Morzine
Silver medal – second place	1987 Oberstdorf
Silver medal – second place	1996 Copenhagen
Bronze medal – third place	1989 Engelberg
Bronze medal – third place	1995 Grindelwald

Anna Louise Marmont (born 22 May 1967) is a Swedish curler, world champion and Olympic medalist. She received a bronze medal at the 1998 Winter Olympics in Nagano.

In 1989 she was inducted into the Swedish Curling Hall of Fame and in 2020 she and the rest of Team Gustafson were inducted into the World Curling Hall of Fame.
