= Cathrine Lindahl =

Swedish curler and Olympic gold medalist

- Curler
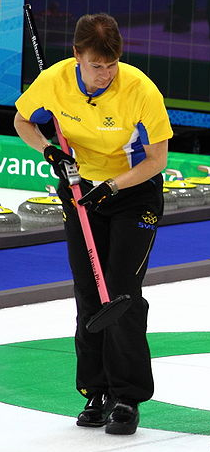
- Lindahl at the 2010 Winter Olympics
- Born: Cathrine Norberg; 26 February 1970 (age 56); Härnösand, Sweden

Curling career
- Member Association: Sweden
Medal record
Women's curling
Olympic Games
Gold medal – first place	2006 Turin	Women's
Gold medal – first place	2010 Vancouver	Women's
World Championships
Gold medal – first place	2005 Paisley	Women's
Gold medal – first place	2006 Grande Prairie	Women's
Silver medal – second place	2001 Lausanne	Women's
Silver medal – second place	2009 Gangneung	Women's
Bronze medal – third place	1991 Winnipeg	Women's
Bronze medal – third place	2003 Winnipeg	Women's
European Championships
Gold medal – first place	2001 Vierumäki	Women's
Gold medal – first place	2002 Grindelwald	Women's
Gold medal – first place	2003 Courmayeur	Women's
Gold medal – first place	2004 Sofia	Women's
Gold medal – first place	2005 Garmisch-Partenkirchen	Women's
Gold medal – first place	2007 Füssen	Women's
Silver medal – second place	2008 Härnösand	Women's
Bronze medal – third place	1991 Chamonix	Women's
World Junior Championships
Gold medal – first place	1991 Glasgow	Women's
Silver medal – second place	1990 Portage la Prairie	Women's

Cathrine Lindahl (born 26 February 1970 in Härnösand as Cathrine Norberg) is a Swedish curler from Östersund. Lindahl played second for her sister Anette Norberg's team, until they split up in 2010. They won gold medals at the 2006 Winter Olympics and 2010 Winter Olympics.

== Curling career ==
Lindahl skipped a team to both the 1989 and 1990 World Junior Curling Championships, winning the silver medal in the latter, losing to Kirsty Addison of Scotland. The following year, she was an alternate for the gold medal Swedish team skipped by Eva Eriksson. In 1991, she played third for her sister at the World Curling Championships where they won bronze. At that year's European Curling Championships she played second for the team, and won bronze. In 1992, the team went to the 1992 Winter Olympics, where the team finished fifth in the demonstration event.

In 1997, Lindahl skipped her own team at the World Championships, but the team finished in 5th place. By 2001, she was back to playing third for her sister, and they won a silver medal at the World Championships. After that, the team would go on to win the next six European Championships. Lindahl moved to the second position at the beginning of 2003. In addition to six European Championships, the team won a bronze at the Worlds in 2003, a gold in 2005 and an Olympic Championship in 2006.

In 1997 she was inducted into the Swedish Curling Hall of Fame.

== Teammates ==
2006 Torino Olympic Games

Anette Norberg, Skip

Eva Lund, Third

Anna Svärd, Lead

Ulrika Bergman, Alternate

2009 Gangneung World Championships

2010 Vancouver Olympic Games

Anette Norberg, Skip

Eva Lund, Third

Anna Le Moine, Lead

Kajsa Bergström, Alternate
