= German Women's Curling Championship =

The German Women's Curling Championship (German: Deutsche Damen Meisterschaft) is the national championship of women's curling teams in Germany. It has been held annually since the 1974–1975 season, and is organized by the German Curling Association (German: Deutscher Curling Verband).

== List of champions and medallists ==
Team line-ups shows in order: fourth, third, second, lead, alternate (if exists), coach (if exists); skips marked bold.

| Year | Champion | Runner-up | Bronze |
|---|---|---|---|
| 1975 | Münchener EC | | |
| 1976 | CC Bavaria München | | |
| 1977 | Münchener EC | | |
| 1978 | Münchener EC | | |
| 1979 | CC Schwenningen | | |
| 1980 | CC Schwenningen | | |
| 1981 | EC Oberstdorf | | |
| 1982 | CC Schwenningen | | |
| 1983 | SC Riessersee | | |
| 1984 | EC Oberstdorf | | |
| 1985 | SC Riessersee | | |
| 1986 | SC Riessersee | | |
| 1987 | SC Riessersee; Andrea Schöpp | Curling im TuS Stuttgart; Stephanie Mayr | EV Füssen; Josefine Einsle |
| 1988 | SC Riessersee; Andrea Schöpp | CC Hamburg; A. Greverath | EV Füssen; Christiane Jentsch |
| 1989 | SC Riessersee; Andrea Schöpp, Monika Wagner, Barbara Haller, Christina Haller | EC Oberstdorf | Münchener EV |
| 1990 | EC Oberstdorf; Almut Hege-Schöll, Suzanne Fink, Steffi Rossler, Ina Räderer | SC Riessersee | EV Füssen |
| 1991 | SC Riessersee; Andrea Schöpp, Monika Wagner, Heike Wieländer, Christina Haller | Münchener EV; Steffi Mayr | EV Füssen; Josefine Einsle |
| 1992 | CC Füssen; Josefine Einsle, Petra Tschetsch-Hiltensberger, Elisabeth Ländle, Karin Fischer | SG SC Riessersee/Münchener EV; Andrea Schöpp | ? |
| 1993 | CC Füssen; Josefine Einsle, Janet Strayer, Petra Tschetsch-Hiltensberger, Elisabeth Ländle, alternate: Karin Fischer | SG SC Riessersee/Münchener EV | EC Oberstdorf |
| 1994 | CC Füssen; Josefine Einsle, Michaela Greif, Petra Tschetsch-Hiltensberger, Sabine Weber, alternate: Karin Fischer | SC Riessersee | CC Hamburg |
| 1995 | SC Riessersee; Andrea Schöpp, Monika Wagner, Natalie Nessler, Carina Meidele | CC Füssen; Josefine Einsle | CC Hamburg; Sabine Belkofer |
| 1996 | SC Riessersee/CC Schwenningen; Andrea Schöpp | CC Füssen; Josefine Einsle | CC Hamburg; Sabine Belkofer |
| 1997 | SC Riessersee/CC Schwenningen; Andrea Schöpp | CC Füssen; Christiane Jentsch | CC Füssen/EC Oberstdorf; Josefine Einsle |
| 1998 | SC Riessersee/CC Schwenningen; Andrea Schöpp | CC Füssen; Petra Tschetsch | EC Oberstdorf; C. Stock |
| 1999 | SC Riessersee/CC Schwenningen; Andrea Schöpp | EV München; Christiane Jentsch | EC Oberstdorf; C. Stock |
| 2000 | CC Füssen; Petra Tschetsch | SC Riessersee/CC Schwenningen; Andrea Schöpp | CC Hamburg; Sabine Belkofer |
| 2001 | SC Riessersee; Andrea Schöpp, Natalie Nessler, Heike Wieländer, Jane Boake-Cope, alternate: Andrea Stock | CC Füssen; Petra Tschetsch, Josefine Heinzle, Karin Fischer, Gesa Angrick, alternate: Elisabeth Ländle | CC Füssen; Daniela Jentsch, Daniela Wilczek, Lisa Hammer, Stefanie Wilczek |
| 2002 | SC Riessersee; Andrea Schöpp, Monika Wagner, Jane Boake-Cope, Sabine Tobies, alternate: Carina Meidele | CC Füssen; Petra Tschetsch | SC Rießersee/CC Schwenningen; Natalie Nessler, Sabine Belkofer, Heike Wieländer, Andrea Stock |
| 2003 | SC Riessersee/CC Schwenningen; Andrea Schöpp, Monika Wagner, Carina Meidele, Sina Irral, alternate: Anna Hartelt | SG CC Füssen / EC Oberstdorf / Baden-Hills G&CC; Daniela Jentsch, Josephine Obermann, Andrea Stock, Sina Frey, alternate: Lisa Hammer | SG CC Füssen / MEV / EC Oberstdorf; Petra Tschetsch, Gesa Angrick, ?. Mischitz, ?. Müller, alternate: ?. Waldmann |
| 2004 | SC Riessersee; Andrea Schöpp, Monika Wagner, Jane Boake-Cope, Sina Irral, alternate: Anna Hartelt | SG Füssen/Baden-Hills; Daniela Jentsch, Marika Trettin, Josephine Obermann, Lisa Hammer | SG Riessersee / Füssen / Hamburg / Schwenningen; Natalie Nessler, Andrea Stock, Sabine Belkofer, Katja Weisser, alternate: Karin Fischer |
| . | | | |
| 2013 | Andrea Schöpp, Imogen Lehmann, Corinna Scholz, Stella Heiß | Daniela Driendl, Martina Linder, Marika Trettin, Analena Jentsch | Sina Frey, Sabine Belkofer-Kröhnert, Frederike Manner, Claudia Beer |
| 2014 | Imogen Lehmann, Corinna Scholz, Nicole Muskatewitz, Stella Heiß | Sabine Belkofer-Kröhnert, Sina Frey, Frederike Manner, Claudia Beer, alternate: Maike Beer | Pia-Lisa Schöll, Sina Hiltensberger, Simone Ackermann, Carola Sinz, alternate: Franziska Fischer |
| 2015 | Andrea Schöpp, Monika Wagner, Kerstin Ruch, Lisa Ruch | Daniela Driendl, Martina Linder, Marika Trettin, Analena Jentsch | Imogen Lehmann, Corinna Scholz, Stella Heiß, Nicole Muskatewitz |
| 2016 | Andrea Schöpp, Monika Wagner, Lisa Ruch, Andrea Fisher | Maike Beer, Sina Frey, Nicole Muskatewitz, Carola Sinz | Daniela Driendl, Analena Jentsch, Marika Trettin, Pia-Lisa Schöll |
| . | | | |

== See also ==
- German Men's Curling Championship
