= 2012 International ZO Women's Tournament =

- Host city: Wetzikon, Switzerland
- Arena: Curling Center Wetzikon
- Dates: November 30 – December 2
- Winner: (Switzerland) Michèle Jäggi
- Curling club: CC Bern, Bern
- Skip: Michèle Jäggi
- Third: Marisa Winkelhausen
- Second: Stéphanie Jäggi
- Lead: Melanie Barbezät
- Finalist: (Switzerland) Mirjam Ott

The 2012 International ZO Women's Tournament was held from November 30 to December 2 of 2012 at the Curling Center Wetzikon in Wetzikon, Switzerland as part of the 2012–13 World Curling Tour. The event was held in a round robin format, and the purse for the event was CHF16,000, of which the winner, Michèle Jäggi, received CHF6,000. Jäggi defeated three-time champion and last year's runner-up Mirjam Ott in the final with a score of 4–3.

== Teams ==
The teams are listed as follows:

Skip	Third	Second	Lead	Locale
Nora Baumann	Fabienne Übersax	Daniela Oberli	Sarah Vogel	Switzerland
Daniela Driendl	Martina Linder	Marika Trettin	Analena Jentsch	Füssen, Germany
Binia Feltscher	Irene Schori	Franziska Kaufmann	Christine Urech	Flims, Switzerland
Fabienne Fürbringer	Jacqueline Greiner	Nicole Glückler	Sandra Born	Uitikon, Switzerland
Diana Gaspari	Giorgia Apollonio	Chiara Olivieri	Claudia Alvera	Cortina d'Ampezzo, Italy
Ursi Hegner	Nina Ledergerber	Chantal Schmid	Claudia Baumann	Uzwil, Switzerland
Juliane Jacoby	Franziska Fischer	Josephine Obermann	Sibylle Maier	Füssen, Germany
Michèle Jäggi	Marisa Winkelhausen	Stéphanie Jäggi	Melanie Barbezät	Bern, Switzerland
Linda Klímová	Kamila Mošová	Pavla Proksikova	Kateřina Urbanová	Prague, Czech Republic
Isabelle Maillard	Christelle Moura	Anne Grandjean	Camille Hornisberger	Lausanne, Switzerland
Anne Malmi	Oona Kauste	Heidi Hossi	Marjo Hippi	Finland
Ekaterina Antonova (fourth)	Victorya Moiseeva (skip)	Galina Arsenkina	Alina Kovaleva	Moscow, Russia
Mirjam Ott	Carmen Schäfer	Carmen Küng	Janine Greiner	Davos, Switzerland
Evita Regza	Dace Regza	Vineta Smilga	Dace Pastare	Riga, Latvia
Andrea Schöpp	Imogen Oona Lehmann	Corinna Scholz	Stella Heiß	Füssen, Germany
Anna Sidorova	Liudmila Privivkova	Margarita Fomina	Ekaterina Galkina	Moscow, Russia
Manuela Siegrist	Allna Pätz	Nadine Lehmann	Nicole Dünki	Basel, Switzerland
Martina Strnadova	Zuzana Hájková	Iveta Janatova	Eva Malkova	Czech Republic
Hana Synackova	Karolina Frederiksen	Michala Nadherova	Eliska Smska	Czech Republic
Silvana Tirinzoni	Marlene Albrecht	Esther Neuenschwander	Sandra Gantenbein	Aarau, Switzerland
Sandra Ramstein-Attinger	Melanie Wild	Daniela Rupp	Janine Wyss	Dübendorf, Switzerland
Olga Zharkova	Julia Portunova	Julia Guzieva	Ekaterina Sharapova	Moscow, Russia

== Round-robin standings ==
Final round-robin standings

Key
Teams to Playoffs

Group A	W	L
(Switzerland) Silvana Tirinzoni	4	1
(Germany) Andrea Schöpp	3	2
(Switzerland) Manuela Siegrist	3	2
(Russia) Olga Zharkova	3	2
(Czech Republic) Martina Strnadová	2	3
(Switzerland) Ursi Hegner	0	5

Group B	W	L
(Russia) Anna Sidorova	4	0
(Switzerland) Binia Feltscher	2	2
(Germany) Juliane Jacoby	2	2
(Finland) Anne Malmi	2	2
(Switzerland) Sandra Ramstein-Attinger	0	4

Group C	W	L
(Switzerland) Mirjam Ott	4	0
(Germany) Daniela Driendl	3	1
(Russia) Victorya Moiseeva	2	2
(Switzerland) Isabelle Maillard	1	3
(Czech Republic) Linda Klímová	0	4

Group D	W	L
(Italy) Diana Gaspari	4	1
(Switzerland) Michèle Jäggi	4	1
(Czech Republic) Hana Synacková	3	2
(Switzerland) Fabienne Fürbringer	2	3
(Switzerland) Nora Baumann	1	4
(Latvia) Evita Regza	1	4

== Playoffs ==
The playoffs draw is listed as follows:

Quarterfinals
(Switzerland) Silvana Tirinzoni	4
(Switzerland) Binia Feltscher	2
(Switzerland) Mirjam Ott	5
(Italy) Diana Gaspari	3
(Russia) Anna Sidorova	7
(Germany) Daniela Driendl	2
(Switzerland) Michèle Jäggi	6
(Germany) Andrea Schöpp	4

Semifinals
(Switzerland) Silvana Tirinzoni	5
(Switzerland) Mirjam Ott	6
(Russia) Anna Sidorova	4
(Switzerland) Michèle Jäggi	7

Final
(Switzerland) Mirjam Ott	3
(Switzerland) Michèle Jäggi	4

Third-place game
1	(Switzerland) Silvana Tirinzoni	2
2	(Russia) Anna Sidorova	6
