= Christina Haller =

German curler

- Curler ♀
- Born: 22 March 1968 (age 58); Räckelwitz, Germany

Team
- Curling club: SC Riessersee; Garmisch-Partenkirchen, Germany

Curling career
- Member Association: Germany
- World Championship: 3 (1989, 1991, 1995)
- European Championship: 5 (1989, 1990, 1994, 2007, 2008)
Medal record
Curling
World Championships
Bronze medal – third place	1989 Milwaukee
European Championships
Gold medal – first place	1989 Engelberg
Silver medal – second place	1994 Sundsvall
German Women's Championship
Gold medal – first place	1989
Gold medal – first place	1991

Christina Haller (born 22 March 1968) is a former German curler.

She is a 1989 European champion.

Following retirement, she became the president of Curling Club Schwenningen.

== Teams ==
Season	Skip	Third	Second	Lead	Alternate	Coach	Events
1985	Barbara Haller	Christina Haller	Sabine Huth	Heike Wieländer			EJCC 1985 (7th)
1988–89	Andrea Schöpp	Monika Wagner	Barbara Haller	Christina Haller			GWCC 1989 (gold); WCC 1989 (bronze)
1988–89	Simone Vogel	Christina Haller	Heike Wieländer	Sabine Belkofer	Michaela Greif		WJCC 1989 (7th)
1989–90	Andrea Schöpp	Monika Wagner	Christina Haller	Heike Wieländer			ECC 1989 (gold)
1990–91	Andrea Schöpp	Monika Wagner	Christina Haller	Heike Wieländer		Rainer Schöpp	ECC 1990 (4th)
1990–91	Andrea Schöpp	Monika Wagner	Heike Wieländer	Christina Haller	Barbara Haller (WCC)	Rainer Schöpp	GWCC 1991 (gold); WCC 1991 (5th)
1994–95	Andrea Schöpp	Monika Wagner	Natalie Nessler	Christina Haller (ECC); Carina Meidele (WCC)	Heike Wieländer	Rainer Schöpp	ECC 1994 (silver); WCC 1995 (4th)
2007	Andrea Schöpp	Monika Wagner	Anna Hartelt	Marie-Therese Rotter	Christina Haller	Rainer Schöpp	ECC 2007 (7th)
2008	Andrea Schöpp	Monika Wagner	Melanie Robillard	Stella Heiss	Christina Haller	Rainer Schöpp	ECC 2008 (4th)
