= 2011 International ZO Women's Tournament =

World Curling Tour event

- Host city: Wetzikon, Switzerland
- Arena: Curling Center Wetzikon
- Dates: November 25–27
- Winner: (Germany) Andrea Schöpp
- Curling club: CC Füssen, Füssen, Germany
- Skip: Andrea Schöpp
- Third: Imogen Oona Lehmann
- Second: Corinna Scholz
- Lead: Stella Heiß
- Finalist: (Switzerland) Mirjam Ott

The 2011 International ZO Women's Tournament was held from November 25 to 27 at the Curling Center Wetzikon in Wetzikon, Switzerland as part of the 2011–12 World Curling Tour. The purse for the event was CHF16,000, and the winner, Andrea Schöpp, received CHF6,000. The event was held in a round-robin format.

== Teams ==
Skip	Third	Second	Lead	Locale
Corrine Bourquin	Fabienne Fürbringer	Daniela Rupp	Andrea Friedli	Uitikon, Switzerland
Daniela Driendl	Martina Linder	Marika Trettin	Gesa Angrick	Germany
Binia Feltscher	Marlene Albrecht	Franziska Kaufmann	Christine Urech	Switzerland
Diana Gaspari	Giorgia Apollonio	Veronica Gerbi	Claudia Alverá	Italy
Juliane Jacoby	Franziska Fischer	Josephine Obertsdorf	Martina Fink	Germany
Michèle Jäggi	Marisa Winkelhausen	Stéphanie Jäggi	Nicole Schwägli	Bern, Switzerland
Sanna Puustinen (fourth)	Heidi Hossi	Eszter Juhász	Oona Kauste (skip)	Finland
Linda Klímová	Lenka Cernovská	Kamila Mosová	Katerina Urbanová	Czech Republic
Anna Kubešková	Tereza Plíšková	Veronika Herdová	Eliška Jalovcová	Czech Republic
Isabelle Maillard	Marina Hauser	Chantal Bugnon	Michela Kaiser	Switzerland
Ramona Meier	Seraina Meier	Manyola Voelkle	Carmen Spreiter	Switzerland
Anette Norberg	Cecilia Östlund	Sara Carlsson	Liselotta Lennartsson	Harnosand, Sweden
Oihane Otaegi	Leire Otaegi	Aitana Saenz	Iera Irazusta	Spain
Mirjam Ott	Carmen Schäfer	Carmen Küng	Janine Greiner	Switzerland
Andrea Schöpp	Imogen Oona Lehmann	Corinna Scholz	Stella Heiß	Füssen, Germany
Manuela Siegrist	Alina Pätz	Claudia Hug	Nicole Dünki	Basel, Switzerland
Anna Sidorova	Liudmila Privivkova	Nkeiruka Ezekh	Ekaterina Galkina	Moscow, Russia
Silvana Tirinzoni	Irene Schori	Esther Neuenschwander	Sandra Gantenbein	Switzerland
Karina Toth	Constanze Hummelt	Andrea Höfler	Tina Sauerstein	Austria
Melanie Wild	Regina Rohner	Laura Wunderlin	Gabriela Welti	Lucerne, Switzerland
Olga Zharkova	Julia Portunova	Alisa Tregub	Julia Guzieva	Russia
Olga Zyablikova	Ekaterina Antonova	Victorya Moiseeva	Galina Arsenkina	Moscow, Russia

== Round robin standings ==
Group A	W	L
(Germany) Andrea Schöpp	4	0
(Switzerland) Silvana Tirinzoni	3	1
(Russia) Olga Zyablikova	2	2
(Switzerland) Melanie Wild	1	3
(Finland) Oona Kauste	0	4

Group B	W	L
(Germany) Daniela Driendl	4	1
(Switzerland) Binia Feltscher	4	1
(Sweden) Anette Norberg	3	2
(Switzerland) Isabelle Maillard	2	3
(Switzerland) Corinne Bourquin	1	4
(Austria) Karina Toth	1	4

Group C	W	L
(Switzerland) Michèle Jäggi	4	1
(Russia) Olga Zharkova	4	1
(Czech Republic) Linda Klímová	3	2
(Italy) Diana Gaspari	2	3
(Switzerland) Ramona Meier	2	3
(Spain) Oihane Otaegi	0	5

Group D	W	L
(Switzerland) Mirjam Ott	4	0
(Switzerland) Manuela Siegrist	3	1
(Germany) Juliane Jacoby	1	3
(Czech Republic) Anna Kubešková	1	3
(Russia) Anna Sidorova	1	3

== Playoffs ==
Quarterfinals
(Germany) Andrea Schöpp	4
(Switzerland) Binia Feltscher	3
(Switzerland) Michèle Jäggi	5
(Switzerland) Manuela Siegrist	4
(Germany) Daniela Driendl	3
(Russia) Olga Zharkova	6
(Switzerland) Mirjam Ott	8
(Switzerland) Silvana Tirinzoni	3

Semifinals
(Germany) Andrea Schöpp	7
(Switzerland) Michèle Jäggi	6
(Russia) Olga Zharkova	3
(Switzerland) Mirjam Ott	6

Final
(Germany) Andrea Schöpp	4
(Switzerland) Mirjam Ott	3
Third Place Match
(Switzerland) Michèle Jäggi	7
(Russia) Olga Zharkova	6
