= Nicole Muskatewitz =

German curler

- Curler ♀
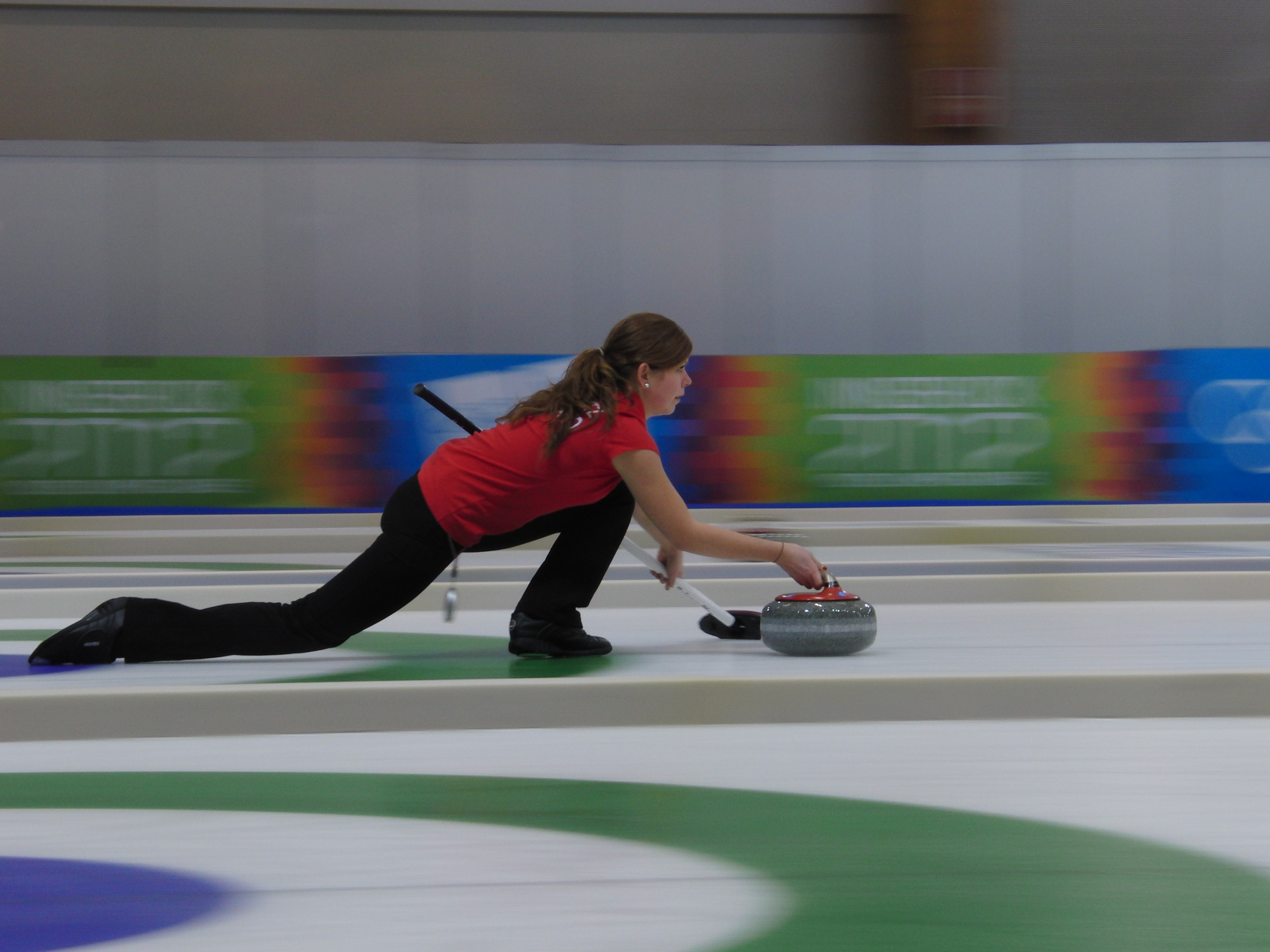
- Born: 6 August 1994 (age 32)

Team
- Curling club: Baden Hills Golf & Curling Club, SC Riessersee; Garmisch-Partenkirchen, Germany

Curling career
- Member Association: Germany
- World Championship: 2 (2013, 2014)
- European Championship: 2 (2012, 2013)
- Other appearances: Winter Universiade: 1 (2017), European Junior Challenge: 2 (2012, 2013), Winter Youth Olympics: 2012 (mixed, mixed doubles)
Medal record
Curling
German Women's Championship
Gold medal – first place	2013 Oberstdorf
Gold medal – first place	2014 Hamburg
Silver medal – second place	2016 Schwenningen
Bronze medal – third place	2015 Hugelsheim
Winter Youth Olympics
Gold medal – first place	2012 Innsbruck (mixed doubles)
European Junior Challenge
Bronze medal – third place	2013 Prague

Nicole Muskatewitz (born 6 August 1994) is a German curler.

At the national level, she is a two-time German women's champion (2013, 2014).

At the international level, she is a 2012 Winter Youth Olympics mixed doubles curling champion alongside Swiss curler Michael Brunner.

== Teams ==
=== Women's ===
Season	Skip	Third	Second	Lead	Alternate	Coach	Events
2011–12	Aylin Lutz	Frederike Manner	Nicole Muskatewitz	Claudia Beer	Lisa-Marie Ritter	Sina Frey	EJCC 2012 (9th)
2012–13	Aylin Lutz	Frederike Manner	Nicole Muskatewitz	Claudia Beer	Maike Beer	Sina Frey	EJCC 2013 (bronze)
2012–13	Andrea Schöpp	Imogen Oona Lehmann	Stella Heiß	Corinna Scholz	Nicole Muskatewitz	Rainer Schöpp (EuCC, WCC), Martin Beiser (EuCC)	ECC 2012 (7th); GWCC 2013 (gold); WCC 2013 (11th)
2013–14	Imogen Oona Lehmann	Corinna Scholz	Nicole Muskatewitz	Stella Heiß	Claudia Beer (WCC)	Holger Höhne (WCC)	GWCC 2014 (gold); WCC 2014 (8th)
2014–15	Imogen Oona Lehmann	Corinna Scholz	Stella Heiß	Nicole Muskatewitz			GWCC 2015 (bronze)
2015–16	Maike Beer	Sina Frey	Nicole Muskatewitz	Carola Sinz			GWCC 2016 (silver)
2016–17	Maike Beer	Claudia Beer	Emira Abbes	Nicole Muskatewitz		Sven Goldemann	WUG 2017 (8th)

=== Mixed ===
Season	Skip	Third	Second	Lead	Coach	Events
2011–12	Daniel Rothballer	Frederike Manner	Kevin Lehmann	Nicole Muskatewitz	Holger Höhne	WYOG 2012 (15th)

=== Mixed doubles ===
Season	Male	Female	Coach	Events
2011–12	Michael Brunner	Nicole Muskatewitz	Brigitte Brunner	WYOG 2012 (gold)
