= Jane Boake-Cope =

German curler

- Curler ♀

Team
- Curling club: SG Schwenningen

Curling career
- Member Association: Germany
- World Championship: 3 (1998, 1999, 2001)
- European Championship: 4 (1998, 1999, 2000, 2003)
Medal record
Curling
European Championships
Gold medal – first place	1998 Flims
German Women's Championship
Gold medal – first place	2001
Gold medal – first place	2002
Gold medal – first place	2004

Jane Boake-Cope is a former German curler.

She is a former European champion (1998).

== Teams ==
Season	Skip	Third	Second	Lead	Alternate	Coach	Events
1998	Andrea Schöpp	Natalie Nessler	Heike Wieländer	Jane Boake-Cope	Andrea Stock	Rainer Schöpp	WCC 1998 (5th)
1998–99	Andrea Schöpp	Natalie Nessler	Heike Wieländer	Jane Boake-Cope	Andrea Stock	Rainer Schöpp	ECC 1998 (gold); WCC 1999 (5th)
1999–00	Andrea Schöpp	Natalie Nessler	Heike Wieländer	Andrea Stock	Jane Boake-Cope	Rainer Schöpp	ECC 1999 (5th)
2000–01	Andrea Schöpp	Natalie Nessler	Heike Wieländer	Andrea Stock	Jane Boake-Cope	Rainer Schöpp	ECC 2000 (4th)
2000–01	Andrea Schöpp	Natalie Nessler	Heike Wieländer	Jane Boake-Cope	Andrea Stock	Rainer Schöpp	GWCC 2001 (gold); WCC 2001 (5th)
2001–02	Andrea Schöpp	Monika Wagner	Jane Boake-Cope	Sabine Tobies	Carina Meidele		GWCC 2002 (gold)
2003–04	Andrea Schöpp	Monika Wagner	Jane Boake-Cope	Anna Hartelt	Sina Irral	Rainer Schöpp	ECC 2003 (7th); GWCC 2004 (gold)
