= Katja Schweizer =

German female curler and coach

- Curler ♀
- Born: Katja Weisser; 23 March 1978 (age 48)

Team
- Curling club: SC Riessersee, Garmisch-Partenkirchen

Curling career
- Member Association: Germany
- World Championship: 1 (2002)
- European Championship: 1 (2001)
- Other appearances: European Mixed Championship: 1 (2011), World Junior Championships: 1 (1998), Winter Universiade: 1 (2003)
Medal record
Curling
European Mixed Championship
Silver medal – second place	2011 Tårnby
German Women's Championship
Bronze medal – third place	2004

Katja Schweizer (born 23 March 1978 as Katja Weisser) is a German curler and curling coach.

As a coach of German wheelchair curling team she participated in 2018 Winter Paralympics.

== Teams ==
=== Women's ===
Season	Skip	Third	Second	Lead	Alternate	Coach	Events
1997–98	Katja Weisser	Caroline Werg	Lucie Victoria Mischitz	Sabine Freiss	Gerke Müller		WJCC 1998 (9th)
2001–02	Andrea Schöpp	Natalie Nessler	Heike Wieländer	Andrea Stock	Katja Weisser	Rainer Schöpp	ECC 2001 (4th)
2001–02	Natalie Nessler	Sabine Belkofer	Heike Wieländer	Andrea Stock	Katja Weisser	Rainer Schöpp	WCC 2002 (9th)
2002–03	Cornelia Stock	Andrea Stock	Katja Weisser	Sabine Freiss		Dick Henderson	WUG 2003 (6th)
2003–04	Natalie Nessler	Andrea Stock	Sabine Belkofer	Katja Weisser	Karin Fischer		GWCC 2004 (bronze)
2006–07	Josephine Obermann	Sina Frey	Karin Fischer	Katja Weisser			

=== Mixed ===
Season	Skip	Third	Second	Lead	Alternate	Events
2011–12	Alexander Baumann	Ann-Kathrin Bastian	Manuel Walter	Katja Weisser	Sebastian Schweizer, Josephine Obermann	EMxCC 2011 (silver)

== Record as a coach of national teams ==
Year	Tournament, event	National team	Place
2005	2005 World Wheelchair Curling Championship	Germany (wheelchair)	13
2005	2005 World Junior Curling Championships	Germany (junior men)	9
2006	2006 European Junior Curling Challenge	Germany (junior men)	3rd place, bronze medalist(s)
2006	2006 European Curling Championships	Austria (men)	23
2007	2007 European Curling Championships	Austria (women)	9
2008	2008 European Curling Championships	Austria (men)	24
2011	2011 European Junior Curling Challenge	Austria (junior men)	10
2012	2012 European Junior Curling Challenge	Austria (junior men)	9
2012	2012 Winter Youth Olympics (mixed curling)	Austria (junior mixed)	14
2012	2012 Winter Youth Olympics (mixed doubles)	Canada (Corryn Brown); Austria (Martin Reichel)	5
2012	2012 Winter Youth Olympics (mixed doubles)	Austria (Irena Brettbacher); Italy (Amos Mosaner)	9
2014	2014 European Junior Curling Challenge	Germany (junior men)	5
2015	2015 European Curling Championships	Germany (men)	6
2016	2016 World Junior B Curling Championships	Germany (junior men)	4
2018	2018 Winter Paralympics	Germany (wheelchair)	8
