= Claudia Beer =

German curler

- Curler ♀
- Born: 4 October 1993 (age 33)

Team
- Curling club: Hamburg CCH, Hamburg

Curling career
- Member Association: Germany
- World Championship: 1 (2014)
- Other appearances: Winter Universiade: 1 (2017), European Junior Challenge: 4 (2012, 2013, 2014, 2015)
Medal record
Curling
German Women's Championship
Silver medal – second place	2014 Hamburg
Bronze medal – third place	2013 Oberstdorf
European Junior Challenge
Bronze medal – third place	2013 Prague

Claudia Beer (born 4 October 1993) is a German curler.

== Teams ==
Season	Skip	Third	Second	Lead	Alternate	Coach	Events
2011–12	Aylin Lutz	Frederike Manner	Nicole Muskatewitz	Claudia Beer	Lisa-Marie Ritter	Sina Frey	EJCC 2012 (9th)
2012–13	Aylin Lutz	Frederike Manner	Nicole Muskatewitz	Claudia Beer	Maike Beer	Sina Frey	EJCC 2013 (bronze)
2012–13	Sina Frey	Sabine Belkofer-Kröhnert	Frederike Manner	Claudia Beer			GWCC 2013 (bronze)
2013–14	Maike Beer	Frederike Manner	Miriam Graap	Claudia Beer	Emira Abbes	Sina Frey	EJCC 2014 (6th)
2013–14	Sabine Belkofer-Kröhnert	Sina Frey	Frederike Manner	Claudia Beer	Maike Beer		GWCC 2014 (silver)
2013–14	Imogen Oona Lehmann	Corinna Scholz	Nicole Muskatewitz	Stella Heiß	Claudia Beer	Holger Höhne	WCC 2014 (8th)
2014–15	Emira Abbes	Amelie Heindl	Claudia Beer	Maike Beer	Franziska Schöberl (EJCC)	Gesa Angrick	EJCC 2015 (5th); GWCC 2015 (4th)
2016–17	Maike Beer	Claudia Beer	Emira Abbes	Nicole Muskatewitz		Sven Goldemann	WUG 2017 (8th)
