= Barbara Haller =

German curler

- Curler ♀

Team
- Curling club: SC Riessersee, Garmisch-Partenkirchen

Curling career
- Member Association: Germany
- World Championship: 2 (1989, 1991)
- Other appearances: European Junior Championships: 1 (1985)
Medal record
Curling
World Championships
Bronze medal – third place	1989 Milwaukee
German Women's Championship
Gold medal – first place	1989

Barbara Haller is a former German curler.

She is a 1989 World women's bronze medallist.

== Teams ==
Season	Skip	Third	Second	Lead	Alternate	Events
1984–85	Barbara Haller	Christina Haller	Sabine Huth	Heike Wieländer		EJCC 1985 (7th)
1988–89	Andrea Schöpp	Monika Wagner	Barbara Haller	Christina Haller		GWCC 1989 (gold); WCC 1989 (bronze)
1990–91	Andrea Schöpp	Monika Wagner	Heike Wieländer	Christina Haller	Barbara Haller	WCC 1991 (5th)
