= Natalie Nessler =

German curler (born 1976)

- Curler ♀
- Born: 8 June 1976 (age 50); Bensheim, Hessen, Germany

Team
- Curling club: SC Riessersee; Garmisch-Partenkirchen, Germany

Curling career
- Member Association: Germany
- World Championship: 7 (1995, 1996, 1997, 1998, 1999, 2001, 2002)
- European Championship: 8 (1994, 1995, 1996, 1997, 1998, 1999, 2000, 2001)
- Olympic: 2 (1998, 2002)
Medal record
Curling
European Championships
Gold medal – first place	1995 Grindelwald
Gold medal – first place	1998 Flims
Silver medal – second place	1994 Sundsvall
Bronze medal – third place	1996 Kopenhagen
Bronze medal – third place	1997 Füssen
German Women's Championship
Gold medal – first place	1995
Bronze medal – third place	2002
Bronze medal – third place	2004

Natalie Nessler (born 8 June 1976 in Bensheim, Hessen, Germany) is a former German curler.

She is a two-time European champion (1995, 1998). She competed in two Winter Olympics: 1998 (8th place) and 2002 (5th place).

== Teams ==
Season	Skip	Third	Second	Lead	Alternate	Coach	Events
1994–95	Andrea Schöpp	Monika Wagner	Natalie Nessler	Christina Haller (ECC); Carina Meidele (WCC)	Heike Wieländer	Rainer Schöpp	ECC 1994 (silver); WCC 1995 (4th)
1995–96	Andrea Schöpp	Monika Wagner	Natalie Nessler	Carina Meidele	Heike Wieländer	Rainer Schöpp	ECC 1995 (gold); WCC 1996 (4th)
1996–97	Andrea Schöpp	Monika Wagner	Natalie Nessler	Carina Meidele	Heike Wieländer	Rainer Schöpp	ECC 1996 (bronze); WCC 1997 (6th)
1996–97	Natalie Nessler	Daniela Jentsch	Sabine Tobies	Andrea Stock	Antonia Bauer		WJCC 1997 (8th)
1997–98	Andrea Schöpp	Monika Wagner	Natalie Nessler	Carina Meidele (ECC); Heike Wieländer (OG)	Heike Wieländer (ECC); Carina Meidele (OG)	Rainer Schöpp	ECC 1997 (bronze); OG 1998 (8th)
1997–98	Andrea Schöpp	Natalie Nessler	Heike Wieländer	Jane Boake-Cope	Andrea Stock	Rainer Schöpp	WCC 1998 (5th)
1998–99	Andrea Schöpp	Natalie Nessler	Heike Wieländer	Jane Boake-Cope	Andrea Stock	Rainer Schöpp	ECC 1998 (gold); WCC 1999 (5th)
1999–00	Andrea Schöpp	Natalie Nessler	Heike Wieländer	Andrea Stock	Jane Boake-Cope]	Rainer Schöpp	ECC 1999 (5th)
2000–01	Andrea Schöpp	Natalie Nessler	Heike Wieländer	Andrea Stock (ECC); Jane Boake-Cope (WCC)	Jane Boake-Cope (ECC); Andrea Stock (WCC)	Rainer Schöpp	ECC 2000 (4th); WCC 2001 (5th)
2001–02	Andrea Schöpp	Natalie Nessler	Heike Wieländer	Andrea Stock	Katja Weisser (ECC)	Rainer Schöpp	ECC 2001 (4th)
2001–02	Natalie Nessler	Sabine Belkofer	Heike Wieländer	Andrea Stock	Karin Fischer (OG); Katja Weisser (WCC)	Rainer Schöpp	OG 2002 (5th); WCC 2002 (9th)
2004–05	Natalie Nessler	Andrea Stock	Sabine Belkofer-Kröhnert	Karin Fischer			
