= Elinore Schöpp =

German curler

- Curler ♀
- Born: 7 January 1936; Werdohl, Germany
- Died: 19 August 2014 (aged 78); Garmisch-Partenkirchen, Germany

Team
- Curling club: SC Riessersee; Garmisch-Partenkirchen, Germany

Curling career
- Member Association: Germany
- World Championship: 3 (1985, 1986, 1987)
- European Championship: 3 (1980, 1983, 1986)
Medal record
Curling
World Championships
Silver medal – second place	1986 Kelowna
Silver medal – second place	1987 Chicago
European Championships
Gold medal – first place	1986 Copenhagen
Bronze medal – third place	1980 Copenhagen

Elinore "Lore" Schöpp (1936–2014) was a German curler. She was the mother of two-time World Champion curler Andrea Schöpp, and former European mixed champion Rainer Schöpp.

== Teams ==
Season	Skip	Third	Second	Lead	Events
1980—81	Andrea Schöpp	Elinore Schöpp	Anneliese Diemer	Monika Wagner	ECC 1980 (bronze)
1983—84	Andrea Schöpp	Monika Wagner	Anneliese Diemer	Elinore Schöpp	ECC 1983 (7th)
1984—85	Andrea Schöpp	Monika Wagner	Christiane Jentsch	Elinore Schöpp	WWCC 1985 (5th)
1985—86	Andrea Schöpp	Monika Wagner	Stephanie Mayr	Elinore Schöpp	WWCC 1986 (silver)
1986—87	Andrea Schöpp	Almut Hege	Monika Wagner	Elinore Schöpp	ECC 1986 (gold); WWCC 1987 (silver)
