= International ZO Women's Tournament =

World Curling Tour event

The International ZO Women's Tournament is an annual bonspiel, or curling tournament, that takes place in late November in Wetzikon, Switzerland. The tournament is held in a triple knockout format. The tournament is part of the World Curling Tour. It is traditionally held a week before the European Curling Championships.

== Past champions ==
Only skip's name is displayed.

Year	Winning team	Runner up team	Purse (CHF)
1984	(Switzerland) Marianne Flotron		
1985	(Germany) Andrea Schöpp		
1986	(Germany) Andrea Schöpp		
1987	(Germany) Andrea Schöpp		
1988	(Germany) Almut Hege		
1989	(Germany) Almut Hege		
1990	(Norway) Dordi Nordby		
1991	(Switzerland) Janet Hürlimann		
1992	(Germany) Andrea Schöpp		
1993	(Germany) Andrea Schöpp		
2002	(Switzerland) Carine Mattille		
2003	(Switzerland) Nicole Strausak		
2004	(Switzerland) Silvana Tirinzoni		
2005	(Switzerland) Irene Schori		
2006	(Switzerland) Manuela Kormann		
2007	(Switzerland) Mirjam Ott	(Russia) Liudmila Privivkova	
2008	(Switzerland) Mirjam Ott	(Switzerland) Marlene Albrecht	14,000
2009	(Scotland) Eve Muirhead	(Germany) Andrea Schöpp	16,000
2010	(Switzerland) Mirjam Ott	(Switzerland) Binia Feltscher	16,000
2011	(Germany) Andrea Schöpp	(Switzerland) Mirjam Ott	16,000
2012	(Switzerland) Michèle Jäggi	(Switzerland) Mirjam Ott	16,000
2013	(Russia) Anna Sidorova	(Switzerland) Silvana Tirinzoni	14,000
2014	(Russia) Anna Sidorova	(Switzerland) Lisa Gisler	14,000
2015	(Switzerland) Binia Feltscher	(Russia) Anna Sidorova	14,000
2016	(Switzerland) Melanie Barbezat	(Germany) Andrea Schöpp	14,000
2017	(Czech Republic) Anna Kubešková	(Russia) Anna Sidorova	14,000
2018	(Czech Republic) Anna Kubešková	(Russia) Alina Kovaleva	16,000
