= Carina Meidele =

German curler

- Curler ♀
- Born: 18 April 1965 (age 61); Krefeld, Germany

Team
- Curling club: SC Riessersee; Garmisch-Partenkirchen, Germany

Curling career
- Member Association: Germany
- World Championship: 3 (1995, 1996, 1997)
- European Championship: 3 (1995, 1996, 1997)
- Olympic: 1 (1998)
Medal record
Curling
European Championships
Gold medal – first place	1995 Grindelwald
Bronze medal – third place	1996 Kopenhagen
Bronze medal – third place	1997 Füssen
German Women's Championship
Gold medal – first place	1995
Gold medal – first place	2002
Gold medal – first place	2003

Carina Meidele (born 18 April 1965 in Krefeld, Germany) is a former German curler.

She is a 1995 European champion and participant at the 1998 Winter Olympics.

== Teams ==
Season	Skip	Third	Second	Lead	Alternate	Coach	Events
1994–95	Andrea Schöpp	Monika Wagner	Natalie Nessler	Carina Meidele	Heike Wieländer (WCC)	Rainer Schöpp	GWCC 1995 (gold); WCC 1995 (4th)
1995–96	Andrea Schöpp	Monika Wagner	Natalie Nessler	Carina Meidele	Heike Wieländer	Rainer Schöpp	ECC 1995 (gold); WCC 1996 (4th)
1996–97	Andrea Schöpp	Monika Wagner	Natalie Nessler	Carina Meidele	Heike Wieländer	Rainer Schöpp	ECC 1996 (bronze); WCC 1997 (6th)
1997–98	Andrea Schöpp	Monika Wagner	Natalie Nessler	Carina Meidele (ECC); Heike Wieländer (OG)	Heike Wieländer (ECC); Carina Meidele (OG)	Rainer Schöpp	ECC 1997 (bronze); OG 1998 (8th)
2001–02	Andrea Schöpp	Monika Wagner	Jane Boake-Cope	Sabine Tobies	Carina Meidele		GWCC 2002 (gold)
2002–03	Andrea Schöpp	Monika Wagner	Carina Meidele	Sina Irral	Anna Hartelt		GWCC 2003 (gold)
