= 1995 European Curling Championships =

- Host city: Grindelwald, Switzerland
- Arena: Sportzentrum
- Dates: December 9–16
- Men's winner: Scotland
- Curling club: Castle Kennedy CC, Stranraer
- Skip: Hammy McMillan
- Third: Norman Brown
- Second: Mike Hay
- Lead: Roger McIntyre
- Alternate: Brian Binnie
- Coach: Hew Chalmers
- Finalist: Switzerland
- Women's winner: Germany
- Curling club: SC Riessersee, Garmisch-Partenkirchen
- Skip: Andrea Schöpp
- Third: Monika Wagner
- Second: Natalie Nessler
- Lead: Carina Meidele
- Alternate: Heike Wieländer
- Coach: Rainer Schöpp
- Finalist: Scotland

The 1995 European Curling Championships were held from December 9 to 16 at the Sportzentrum in Grindelwald, Switzerland.

== Men's ==
=== A Tournament ===
==== Group A ====
Team	Skip	W	L
Norway	Eigil Ramsfjell	5	0
Scotland	Hammy McMillan	4	1
Germany	Andy Kapp	3	2
Austria	Alois Kreidl	2	3
Finland	Jori Aro	1	4
Netherlands	Wim Neeleman	0	5

==== Group B ====
Team	Skip	W	L
Italy	Claudio Pescia	4	1
Switzerland	André Flotron	4	1
England	Alistair Burns	3	2
Sweden	Mats Wranå	2	3
Denmark	Tommy Stjerne	2	3
Wales	Adrian Meikle	0	5

=== B Tournament ===
==== Group A ====
Team	Skip	W	L
France	Jan Henri Ducroz	5	1
Bulgaria	Bojidar Momerin	4	2
Belgium	Didier Plasschaert	4	2
Russia	Igor Minin	3	3
Luxembourg	Hanjörg Bless	3	3
Czech Republic	David Sik	2	4
Hungary	Peter Fenyves	0	6

=== Playoffs ===
Quarterfinal
A1	Norway	5
B4	Sweden	4
B2	Switzerland	7
A3	Germany	5
B1	Italy	6
B-A1	France	4
A2	Scotland	5
B3	England	4

Semi-final
A1	Norway	4
B2	Switzerland	7
B1	Italy	1
A2	Scotland	5

Final
B2	Switzerland	2
A2	Scotland	4

Bronze medal
A1	Norway	9
B1	Italy	1

== Women's ==
=== Group A ===
Team	Skip	W	L
Sweden	Elisabet Gustafson	5	0
Switzerland	Cristina Lestander	4	1
Austria	Edeltraud Koudelka	3	2
Denmark	Dorthe Holm	2	3
Czech Republic	Renée Lepiskova	1	4
Luxembourg	Karen Wauters	0	5

=== Group B ===
Team	Skip	W	L
Scotland	Kirsty Hay	5	0
Germany	Andrea Schöpp	4	1
Norway	Dordi Nordby	3	2
Finland	Jaana Jokela	2	3
England	Janice Manson	1	4
France	Annick Mercier	0	5

=== B Tournament ===
==== Group A ====
Team	Skip	W	L
Russia	Tatiana Smirnova	4	2
Italy	Daniela Zandegiacomo	4	2
Bulgaria	Marina Karagiozova	3	3
Netherlands	Mirjam Boymans-Gast	1	5

=== Playoffs ===
Quarterfinal
A1	Sweden	13
B4	Finland	2
B2	Germany	10
A3	Austria	3
B3	Norway	7
A2	Switzerland	6
B1	Scotland	8
A4	Denmark	4

Semi-final
A1	Sweden	3
B2	Germany	10
B3	Norway	4
B1	Scotland	6

Final
B2	Germany	8
B1	Scotland	3

Bronze medal
A1	Sweden	7
B3	Norway	5
