= Maike Beer =

German curler

- Curler
- Born: 7 June 1996 (age 30); Hamburg, Germany

Team
- Curling club: Curling Club Hamburg
- Skip: Emira Abbes
- Third: Mia Höhne
- Second: Lena Kapp
- Lead: Maike Beer
- Alternate: Pia-Lisa Schöll

Curling career
- Member Association: Germany
- World Championship: 1 (2016)
- World Mixed Championship: 1 (2024)
- European Championship: 2 (2015, 2023)
- Other appearances: Winter Universiade: 1 (2017), World Junior-B Championships: 2 (2016, 2017), European Junior Challenge: 3 (2013, 2014, 2015)
Medal record
Women's curling
European Junior Challenge
Bronze medal – third place	2013 Prague
German Women's Championship
Gold medal – first place	2024
Silver medal – second place	2014
Silver medal – second place	2016

Maike Beer (born 7 June 1996 in Hamburg) is a German curler. She currently plays lead on the German national women's curling team, skipped by Emira Abbes.

== Teams ==
Season	Skip	Third	Second	Lead	Alternate	Coach	Events
2012–13	Aylin Lutz	Frederike Manner	Nicole Muskatewitz	Claudia Beer	Maike Beer	Sina Frey	EJCC 2013 (bronze)
2013–14	Maike Beer	Frederike Manner	Miriam Graap	Claudia Beer	Emira Abbes	Sina Frey	EJCC 2014 (6th)
2013–14	Sabine Belkofer-Kröhnert	Sina Frey	Frederike Manner	Claudia Beer	Maike Beer		GWCC 2014 (silver)
2014–15	Emira Abbes	Amelie Heindl	Claudia Beer	Maike Beer	Franziska Schöberl (EJCC)	Gesa Angrick	EJCC 2015 (5th); GWCC 2015 (4th)
2015–16	Maike Beer	Emira Abbes	Mia Höhne	Lena Kapp	Klara-Hermine Fomm	Gesa Angrick	WJBCC 2016 (11th)
2015–16	Maike Beer	Sina Frey	Nicole Muskatewitz	Carola Sinz			GWCC 2016 (silver)
2015–16	Daniela Driendl	Analena Jentsch	Marika Trettin	Pia-Lisa Schöll	Maike Beer	Thomas Lips	ECC 2015 (7th); WCC 2016 (9th)
2016–17	Maike Beer	Mia Höhne	Laura Mayrhans	Lena Kapp	Fiona Wunderlich	Holger Höhne	WJBCC 2017 (5th)
2016–17	Maike Beer	Claudia Beer	Emira Abbes	Nicole Muskatewitz		Sven Goldemann	WUG 2017 (8th)
2023–24	Emira Abbes	Lena Kapp	Mia Höhne	Maike Beer	Pia-Lisa Schöll		ECC 2023
