= Sabine Belkofer =

German curler and coach

- Curler ♀
- Born: 27 November 1967 (age 58)

Team
- Curling club: CC Hamburg

Curling career
- Member Association: Germany
- World Championship: 1 (2002)
- European Championship: 1 (1988)
- Olympic: 1 (2002)
Medal record
Curling
German Women's Championship
Silver medal – second place	2014
Bronze medal – third place	1995
Bronze medal – third place	1996
Bronze medal – third place	1996
Bronze medal – third place	2000
Bronze medal – third place	2002
Bronze medal – third place	2004
Bronze medal – third place	2013

Sabine Belkofer (also known as Sabine Belkofer-Kröhnert, Belkofer-Krehnert; born 27 November 1967) is a former German curler and curling coach.

She competed at the 2002 Winter Olympics, finishing in 5th place.

She works as a business manager at the Hamburg Curling Club.

== Teams ==
Season	Skip	Third	Second	Lead	Alternate	Coach	Events
1987–88	Simone Vogel	Kerstin Jüders	Angelika Schaffer	Sabine Belkofer			WJCC 1988 (9th)
1988–89	Stephanie Mayr	Simone Vogel	Sabine Belkofer	Hatti Foster			ECC 1988 (6th)
1988–89	Simone Vogel	Christina Haller	Heike Wieländer	Sabine Belkofer	Michaela Greif		WJCC 1989 (7th)
2001–02	Natalie Nessler	Sabine Belkofer	Heike Wieländer	Andrea Stock	Karin Fischer (OG); Katja Weisser (WCC)	Rainer Schöpp	OG 2002 (5th); WCC 2002 (9th)
2004–05	Natalie Nessler	Andrea Stock	Sabine Belkofer-Kröhnert	Karin Fischer			
2012–13	Sina Frey	Sabine Belkofer-Kröhnert	Frederike Manner	Claudia Beer			GWCC 2013 (bronze)
2013–14	Sabine Belkofer-Kröhnert	Sina Frey	Frederike Manner	Claudia Beer	Maike Beer		GWCC 2014 (silver)

== Record as a coach of national teams ==
Year	Tournament, event	National team	Place
2001	2001 World Junior Curling Championships	Germany (junior men)	8
