= 1998 European Curling Championships =

- Host city: Flims, Switzerland
- Arena: Die Alpenarena
- Dates: December 5-12, 1998
- Men's winner: Sweden
- Skip: Peja Lindholm
- Third: Tomas Nordin
- Second: Magnus Swartling
- Lead: Peter Narup
- Alternate: Joakim Carlsson
- Finalist: Scotland
- Women's winner: Germany
- Curling club: SC Riessersee, Garmisch-Partenkirchen
- Skip: Andrea Schöpp
- Third: Natalie Neßler
- Second: Heike Wieländer
- Lead: Jane Boake-Cope
- Alternate: Andrea Stock
- Coach: Rainer Schöpp
- Finalist: Scotland

The 1998 European Curling Championships were held in Flims, Switzerland December 5-12.

== Men's ==
=== A Tournament ===
==== Group A ====
Team	Skip	W	L
Sweden	Peja Lindholm	5	0
Germany	Daniel Herberg	4	1
Switzerland	Felix Luchsinger	3	2
Netherlands	Floris van Imhoff	2	3
Wales	John Hunt	1	4
Luxembourg	Heribert Krämer	0	5

==== Group B ====
Team	Skip	W	L
Norway	Tormod Andreassen	5	0
Finland	Markku Uusipaavalniemi	4	1
Scotland	Gordon Muirhead	3	2
Denmark	Tommy Stjerne	2	3
England	Martyn Deakin	1	4
France	Jan Henri Ducroz	0	5

=== B Tournament ===
==== Group A ====
Team	Skip	W	L
Czech Republic	David Sik	3	1
Russia	Alexsey Tselousov	3	1
Italy	Claudio Pescia	2	2
Austria	Joachim Märker	1	3
Bulgaria	Lubomir Velinov	1	3

=== Playoffs ===
Quarterfinal
Sweden	9
Denmark	6
Switzerland	3
Finland	8
Germany	3
Scotland	6
Czech Republic	2
Norway	11

Semi-final
Sweden	7
Finland	6
Scotland	4
Norway	3

Final
Sweden	6
Scotland	5

Bronze medal
Finland	5
Norway	6

=== Medals ===
Medal	Team
Gold	Sweden (Peja Lindholm, Tomas Nordin, Magnus Swartling, Peter Narup, and Joakim Carlsson)
Silver	Scotland (Gordon Muirhead, David Smith, Peter Smith, David Hay, and John Muir)
Bronze	Norway (Tormod Andreassen, Niclas Järund, Stig-Arne Gunnestad, Kjell Berg, and Stig Høiberg)

== Women's ==
=== Group A ===
Team	Skip	W	L
Sweden	Anette Norberg	6	0
Switzerland	Nadja Heuer	5	1
Finland	Anne Eerikäinen	4	2
France	Audé Bénier	3	3
England	Joan Reed	2	4
Netherlands	Beatrice Miltenburg-Wallis	1	5
Czech Republic	Renée Lepiskova	0	5

=== Group B ===
Team	Skip	W	L
Scotland	Rhona Martin	5	1
Germany	Andrea Schöpp	5	1
Norway	Dordi Nordby	4	2
Denmark	Helena Blach Lavrsen	4	2
Italy	Giulia Lacedelli	2	4
Russia	Tatiana Smirnova	1	5
Luxembourg	Karen Wauters	0	6

=== Playoffs ===
Quarterfinal
Sweden	4
Denmark	9
Finland	3
Germany	6
Switzerland	6
Norway	5
France	4
Scotland	5

Semi-final
Denmark	6
Germany	7
Switzerland	1
Scotland	9

Final
Germany	12
Scotland	4

Bronze medal
Denmark	10
Switzerland	5

=== Medals ===
Medal	Team
Gold	Germany (Andrea Schöpp, Natalie Neßler, Heike Wieländer, Jane Boake-Cope, and Andrea Stock)
Silver	Scotland (Rhona Martin, Gail McMillan, Mairi Herd, Janice Watt, and Claire Milne)
Bronze	Denmark (Helena Blach Lavrsen, Dorthe Holm, Trine Qvist, Lisa Richardson, and Jeanett Syngre)
