= Marika Trettin =

German curler

- Curler ♀
- Born: 12 August 1983 (age 43); Altenberg, Saxony, East Germany

Team
- Curling club: CC Füssen, Füssen

Curling career
- Member Association: Germany
- World Championship: 2 (2015, 2016)
- European Championship: 3 (2004, 2015, 2016)
- Other appearances: European Mixed Championship: 1 (2006)
Medal record
Curling
German Women's Championship
Silver medal – second place	2004
Silver medal – second place	2013
Silver medal – second place	2015

Marika Trettin (born 12 August 1983 in Altenberg, Saxony) is a German female curler.

== Teams ==
=== Women's ===
Season	Skip	Third	Second	Lead	Alternate	Coach	Events
2003–04	Daniela Jentsch	Marika Trettin	Josephine Obermann	Lisa Hammer			GWCC 2004 (silver)
2004–05	Daniela Jentsch	Lisa Hammer	Sina Frey	Marika Trettin	Petra Tschetsch	Dick Henderson	ECC 2004 (9th)
2006–07	Daniela Jentsch	Corinna Scholz	Martina Linder	Marika Trettin			
2010–11	Daniela Jentsch	Petra Tschetsch	Marika Trettin	Gesa Angrick			
2011–12	Daniela Driendl	Martina Linder	Marika Trettin	Gesa Angrick			
2012–13	Daniela Driendl	Martina Linder	Marika Trettin	Analena Jentsch			GWCC 2013 (silver)
2013–14	Daniela Driendl	Martina Linder	Marika Trettin	Analena Jentsch			
2013–14	Marika Trettin	Analena Jentsch	Emira Abbes	Amelie Heindl			GWCC 2014 (4th)
2014–15	Daniela Driendl	Martina Linder	Marika Trettin	Analena Jentsch			GWCC 2015 (silver)
2014–15	Daniela Driendl	Analena Jentsch	Stella Heiß	Pia-Lisa Schöll	Marika Trettin	Thomas Lips	WCC 2015 (9th)
2015–16	Daniela Driendl	Analena Jentsch	Marika Trettin	Pia-Lisa Schöll	Maike Beer	Thomas Lips	ECC 2015 (7th); WCC 2016 (9th)
2016–17	Daniela Jentsch	Analena Jentsch	Josephine Obermann	Pia-Lisa Schöll	Marika Trettin	Thomas Lips	ECC 2016 (7th)

=== Mixed ===
Season	Skip	Third	Second	Lead	Alternate	Events
2006–07	Roland Jentsch	Daniela Jentsch	Uli Sutor	Marika Trettin	Helmar Erlewein	EMxCC 2006 (10th)
