= Lena Kapp =

German curler

- Curler ♀

Team
- Curling club: CC Füssen; Füssen, GER
- Skip: Emira Abbes
- Third: Mia Höhne
- Second: Lena Kapp
- Lead: Maike Beer
- Alternate: Pia-Lisa Schöll

Curling career
- Member Association: Germany
- World Championship: 1 (2023)
- World Mixed Doubles Championship: 1 (2024)
- European Championship: 3 (2018, 2022, 2023)
Medal record
Curling
Representing Germany
European Championships
Bronze medal – third place	2018 Tallinn

Lena Kapp is a German female curler.

At the international level, she is a 2018 European Championships bronze medalist.

== Teams and events ==
=== Women's ===
Season	Skip	Third	Second	Lead	Alternate	Coach	Events
2015–16	Maike Beer	Emira Abbes	Mia Höhne	Lena Kapp	Klara-Hermine Fomm	Gesa Angrick	WJBCC 2016 (11th)
2016–17	Maike Beer	Mia Höhne	Laura Mayrhans	Lena Kapp	Fiona Wunderlich	Holger Höhne	WJBCC 2017 (5th)
2017–18	Mia Höhne	Lena Kapp	Laura Mayrhans	Sophia Roesel	Leonie Schöberl	Holger Höhne	WJBCC 2018 (5th)
2018–19	Daniela Jentsch	Emira Abbes	Analena Jentsch	Klara-Hermine Fomm	Lena Kapp	Uli Kapp	ECC 2018 (bronze)
2018–19	Mia Höhne	Lena Kapp	Laura Mayrhans	Leonie Schöberl	Fiona Wunderlich	Holger Höhne	WJBCC 2019 (Jan) (5th)
2019–20	Lena Kapp	Kim Sutor	Zoe Antes	Anne Kapp	Sara Messenzehl	Holger Höhne	WJBCC 2019 (Dec) (13th)
2019–20	Mia Höhne	Lena Kapp	Kim Sutor	Zoe Antes			
2022–23	Daniela Jentsch	Emira Abbes	Pia-Lisa Schöll	Analena Jentsch	Lena Kapp	Uli Kapp, Daniel Herberg	ECC 2022 (7th)
2022–23	Daniela Jentsch	Emira Abbes	Lena Kapp	Analena Jentsch	Pia-Lisa Schöll	Uli Kapp, Christian Hungerecker	WCC 2023 (10th)
2023–24	Emira Abbes (fourth)	Mia Höhne (skip)	Lena Kapp	Maike Beer	Pia-Lisa Schöll	Uli Kapp	ECC 2023 (10th)

=== Mixed doubles ===
Season	Female	Male	Coach	Events
2018–19	Lena Kapp	Benny Kapp		
2019–20	Lena Kapp	Marc Muskatewitz		
2020–21	Lena Kapp	Marc Muskatewitz		
2023–24	Lena Kapp	Sixten Totzek	Uli Kapp	WMDCC 2024 (11th)

== Personal life ==
Lena Kapp is a member of a family of German curlers. Her grandfather Charlie, father Andy, uncle Uli, younger brother Benny are well-known German curlers, participants in the Winter Olympics, World and European Championships; her younger sister Anne played with Lena at the 2019 World Junior-B Curling Championships (December), and then without her at the 2023 World Junior Championships.
