= German Curling Association =

Sports governing body

- Sport: Curling
- Jurisdiction: National
- Abbreviation: DCV
- Founded: 1966
- Affiliation: World Curling Federation
- Headquarters: Füssen
- President: Bernhard Mayr

Official website
- www.curling-dcv.de
- (Germany)

The German Curling Association (DCV) (German: Deutscher Curling Verband) is the national governing body of the sport of curling in Germany.

== Member clubs ==
There are 16 curling clubs in Germany.

== Competitive history ==
=== World Curling Championships ===
==== Men's ====
As of 2019 Germany has made 48 appearances at the men's World Curling Championships, earning a medal 10 of those times.

Year	Skip	Medal
1972	Manfred Räderer	3rd place, bronze medalist(s)
1982	Keith Wendorf	3rd place, bronze medalist(s)
1983	Keith Wendorf	2nd place, silver medalist(s)
1987	Rodger Schmidt	2nd place, silver medalist(s)
1994	Andy Kapp	3rd place, bronze medalist(s)
1995	Andy Kapp	3rd place, bronze medalist(s)
1997	Andy Kapp	2nd place, silver medalist(s)
2004	Sebastian Stock	2nd place, silver medalist(s)
2005	Andy Kapp	3rd place, bronze medalist(s)
2007	Andy Kapp	2nd place, silver medalist(s)

==== Women's ====
As of 2019 Germany has made 37 appearances at the women's World Curling Championships, earning a medal 8 of those times.

Year	Skip	Medal
1984	Almut Hege	3rd place, bronze medalist(s)
1986	Andrea Schöpp	2nd place, silver medalist(s)
1987	Andrea Schöpp	2nd place, silver medalist(s)
1988	Andrea Schöpp	1st place, gold medalist(s)
1989	Andrea Schöpp	3rd place, bronze medalist(s)
1993	Janet Strayer	2nd place, silver medalist(s)
1994	Josefine Einsle	3rd place, bronze medalist(s)
2010	Andrea Schöpp	1st place, gold medalist(s)

=== Olympics ===
==== Men's ====
Germany has qualified 5 times for men's curling at the Winter Olympics, with their best finish being 6th (twice).

==== Women's ====
Germany has qualified 3 times for women's curling at the Winter Olympics, with their best finish being 5th.
