= Suzanne Fink =

German curler and coach

- Curler ♀

Team
- Curling club: EC Oberstdorf, SC Riessersee; Garmisch-Partenkirchen, Germany

Curling career
- Member Association: Germany
- World Championship: 4 (1981, 1984, 1988, 1990)
- European Championship: 4 (1982, 1984, 1985, 1987)
- Olympic: 1 (1988)
Medal record
Curling
World Championships
| Gold medal – first place | 1988 Glasgow |
| Bronze medal – third place | 1984 Perth |
European Championships
| Gold medal – first place | 1984 Morzine |
| Gold medal – first place | 1987 Oberstdorf |
German Women's Championship
| Gold medal – first place | 1990 |
German Mixed Championship
| Gold medal – first place | 1990 |

Suzanne Fink (born as Suzanne Koch, also known as Suzanne Fink-Koch) is a former German curler and curling coach.

She is a former World champion (1988) and two-time European champion (1984, 1987). She competed at the 1988 Winter Olympics when curling was a demonstration sport.

== Teams ==
=== Women's ===
| Season | Skip | Third | Second | Lead | Alternate | Events |
|---|---|---|---|---|---|---|
| 1980–81 | Almut Hege | Suzanne Koch | Renate Räderer | Ingeborg Stock | | WCC 1981 (9th) |
| 1982–83 | Almut Hege | Josefine Einsle | Suzanne Koch | Petra Tschetsch | | ECC 1982 (9th); WCC CR 1982 (gold) |
| 1983–84 | Almut Hege | Josefine Einsle | Suzanne Koch | Petra Tschetsch | | WCC 1984 (bronze) |
| 1984–85 | Almut Hege | Josefine Einsle | Suzanne Koch | Petra Tschetsch | | ECC 1984 (gold) |
| 1985–86 | Almut Hege | Petra Tschetsch | Suzanne Fink | Josefine Einsle | | ECC 1985 (6th) |
| 1987–88 | Andrea Schöpp | Almut Hege-Schöll | Monika Wagner | Suzanne Fink | | ECC 1987 (gold); OG 1988 (demo) (4th); WCC 1988 (gold) |
| 1989–90 | Almut Hege-Schöll | Suzanne Fink | Stefan Rossler | Ina Räderer | Josefine Einsle (WCC) | GWCC 1990 (gold); WCC 1990 (5th) |

=== Mixed ===
| Season | Skip | Third | Second | Lead | Events |
|---|---|---|---|---|---|
| 1989–90 | Uli Sutor | Susanne Fink | Charlie Kapp | Gisela Ibald | GMxCC 1990 (gold) |

== Record as a coach of national teams ==
| Year | Tournament, event | National team | Place |
|---|---|---|---|
| 1999 | 1999 World Junior Curling Championships | Germany (junior women) | 9 |
