= 2001 World Women's Curling Championship =

Sporting event

- Host city: Lausanne, Switzerland
- Arena: Malley Sports Centre
- Dates: March 31–April 8, 2001
- Winner: Canada
- Curling club: Mayflower CC, Halifax, Nova Scotia
- Skip: Colleen Jones
- Third: Kim Kelly
- Second: Mary-Anne Waye
- Lead: Nancy Delahunt
- Alternate: Laine Peters
- Coach: Ken Bagnell
- Finalist: Sweden (Anette Norberg)

The 2001 World Women's Curling Championship (branded as 2001 Ford World Women's Curling Championship for sponsorship reasons) was held March 31–April 8, 2001 at the Malley Sports Centre in Lausanne, Switzerland.

== Teams ==
Canada	Denmark	Germany	Japan	Norway
Mayflower CC, Halifax, Nova Scotia Skip: Colleen Jones; Third: Kim Kelly; Second: Mary-Anne Waye; Lead: Nancy Delahunt; Alternate: Laine Peters	Hvidovre CC Skip: Lene Bidstrup; Third: Malene Krause; Second: Susanne Slotsager; Lead: Avijaja Lund Nielsen; Alternate: Lisa Richardson	SC Riessersee, Garmisch-Partenkirchen Skip: Andrea Schöpp; Third: Natalie Nessler; Second: Heike Schwaller; Lead: Jane Boake-Cope; Alternate: Andrea Stock	Tokoro CC, Kitami Skip: Akiko Katoh; Third: Yumie Hayashi; Second: Ayumi Onodera; Lead: Mika Konaka; Alternate: Yukari Okazaki	Snarøen CC, Oslo Skip: Dordi Nordby; Third: Hanne Woods; Second: Marianne Haslum; Lead: Kristin Løvseth; Alternate: Camilla Holth
Russia*	Scotland	Sweden	Switzerland	United States
Moskvitch CC, Moscow Fourth: Olga Jarkova; Skip: Nina Golovtchenko; Second: Nkeiruka Ezekh; Lead: Yana Nekrasova; Alternate: Anastassia Skoultan	Kirriemuir Ladies CC, Glasgow Skip: Julia Ewart; Third: Heather Byers; Second: Nancy Murdoch; Lead: Lynn Cameron; Alternate: Edith Loudon	Härnösands CK Skip: Anette Norberg; Third: Cathrine Norberg; Second: Eva Lund; Lead: Helena Lingham; Alternate: Maria Engholm	Solothurn CC Skip: Nadja Heuer; Third: Carmen Küng; Second: Sybil Bachofen; Lead: Vera Heuer; Alternate: Yvonne Schlunegger	Bemidji CC, Bemidji, Minnesota Skip: Kari Erickson; Third: Debbie McCormick; Second: Stacey Liapis; Lead: Ann Swisshelm; Alternate: Joni Cotten

*First Appearance

== Round-robin standings ==
Country	Skip	W	L
Canada	Colleen Jones	7	2
Sweden	Anette Norberg	7	2
Scotland	Julia Ewart	6	3
Denmark	Lene Bidstrup	6	3
Germany	Andrea Schöpp	5	4
United States	Kari Erickson	5	4
Japan	Akiko Katoh	4	5
Norway	Dordi Nordby	3	6
Russia	Nina Golovtchenko	2	7
Switzerland	Nadja Heuer	0	9

== Round-robin results ==
=== Draw 1 ===
Sheet A	Final
United States (Erickson)	6
Japan (Katoh)	4

Sheet B	Final
Scotland (Ewart)	4
Germany (Schöpp)	6

Sheet C	Final
Switzerland (Heuer)	2
Russia (Golovtchenko)	9

Sheet D	Final
Canada (Jones)	6
Denmark (Bidstrup)	7

Sheet E	Final
Norway (Nordby)	2
Sweden (Norberg)	5

=== Draw 2 ===
Sheet A	Final
Norway (Nordby)	6
Scotland (Ewart)	4

Sheet B	Final
Russia (Golovtchenko)	5
Sweden (Norberg)	11

Sheet C	Final
United States (Erickson)	6
Canada (Jones)	5

Sheet D	Final
Switzerland (Heuer)	8
Japan (Katoh)	10

Sheet E	Final
Germany (Schöpp)	9
Denmark (Bidstrup)	10

=== Draw 3 ===
Sheet A	Final
Denmark (Bidstrup)	3
Sweden (Norberg)	8

Sheet B	Final
Japan (Katoh)	8
Canada (Jones)	9

Sheet C	Final
Germany (Schöpp)	8
Norway (Nordby)	5

Sheet D	Final
Russia (Golovtchenko)	4
United States (Erickson)	7

Sheet E	Final
Switzerland (Heuer)	4
Scotland (Ewart)	6

=== Draw 4 ===
Sheet A	Final
Japan (Katoh)	4
Germany (Schöpp)	6

Sheet B	Final
Switzerland (Heuer)	5
United States (Erickson)	7

Sheet C	Final
Scotland (Ewart)	4
Sweden (Norberg)	3

Sheet D	Final
Denmark (Bidstrup)	6
Norway (Nordby)	5

Sheet E	Final
Canada (Jones)	8
Russia (Golovtchenko)	4

=== Draw 5 ===
Sheet A	Final
Switzerland (Heuer)	8
Norway (Nordby)	10

Sheet B	Final
Germany (Schöpp)	7
Russia (Golovtchenko)	8

Sheet C	Final
Japan (Katoh)	9
Denmark (Bidstrup)	0

Sheet D	Final
Scotland (Ewart)	4
Canada (Jones)	5

Sheet E	Final
Sweden (Norberg)	8
United States (Erickson)	5

=== Draw 6 ===
Sheet A	Final
Sweden (Norberg)	1
Canada (Jones)	8

Sheet B	Final
United States (Erickson)	4
Denmark (Bidstrup)	6

Sheet C	Final
Russia (Golovtchenko)	5
Scotland (Ewart)	12

Sheet D	Final
Germany (Schöpp)	7
Switzerland (Heuer)	5

Sheet E	Final
Japan (Katoh)	7
Norway (Nordby)	5

=== Draw 7 ===
Sheet A	Final
Scotland (Ewart)	8
United States (Erickson)	2

Sheet B	Final
Sweden (Norberg)	8
Japan (Katoh)	4

Sheet C	Final
Canada (Jones)	9
Germany (Schöpp)	3

Sheet D	Final
Norway (Nordby)	8
Russia (Golovtchenko)	4

Sheet E	Final
Denmark (Bidstrup)	9
Switzerland (Heuer)	3

=== Draw 8 ===
Sheet A	Final
Russia (Golovtchenko)	3
Denmark (Bidstrup)	7

Sheet B	Final
Canada (Jones)	8
Norway (Nordby)	1

Sheet C	Final
Sweden (Norberg)	9
Switzerland (Heuer)	4

Sheet D	Final
Japan (Katoh)	7
Scotland (Ewart)	12

Sheet E	Final
United States (Erickson)	4
Germany (Schöpp)	8

=== Draw 9 ===
Sheet A	Final
Canada (Jones)	11
Switzerland (Heuer)	5

Sheet B	Final
Denmark (Bidstrup)	4
Scotland (Ewart)	6

Sheet C	Final
Norway (Nordby)	5
United States (Erickson)	10

Sheet D	Final
Sweden (Norberg)	6
Germany (Schöpp)	5

Sheet E	Final
Russia (Golovtchenko)	6
Japan (Katoh)	9

== Playoffs ==
=== Brackets ===
Semi-final
1	Canada	10
4	Denmark	4
2	Sweden	8
3	Scotland	4

Final
1	Canada	5
2	Sweden	2
Bronze medal
4	Scotland	6
3	Denmark	7

=== Final ===
Sheet A	1	2	3	4	5	6	7	8	9	10	Final
Sweden (Norberg)	0	0	0	0	0	0	0	0	2	0	2
Canada (Jones)	0	0	0	0	1	0	2	1	0	1	5
