= Andrea Stock =

German curler

- Curler ♀
- Born: 28 November 1980 (age 45); Caracas, Venezuela

Team
- Curling club: SC Riessersee; Garmisch-Partenkirchen, Germany

Curling career
- Member Association: Germany
- World Championship: 4 (1998, 1999, 2001, 2002)
- European Championship: 4 (1998, 1999, 2000, 2001)
- Olympic: 1 (2002)
- Other appearances: Winter Universiade: 1 (2003)
Medal record
Curling
European Championships
Gold medal – first place	1998 Flims
German Women's Championship
Gold medal – first place	2001
Silver medal – second place	2003
Bronze medal – third place	2002
Bronze medal – third place	2004

Andrea Stock (born 28 November 1980 in Caracas, Venezuela) is a former German curler.

She is a former European champion (1998) and competed at the 2002 Winter Olympics, finishing in 5th place.

== Teams ==
Season	Skip	Third	Second	Lead	Alternate	Coach	Events
1997	Natalie Nessler	Daniela Jentsch	Sabine Tobies	Andrea Stock	Antonia Bauer		WJCC 1997 (8th)
1998	Andrea Schöpp	Natalie Nessler	Heike Wieländer	Jane Boake-Cope	Andrea Stock	Rainer Schöpp	WCC 1998 (5th)
1998–99	Andrea Schöpp	Natalie Nessler	Heike Wieländer	Jane Boake-Cope	Andrea Stock	Rainer Schöpp	ECC 1998 (gold); WCC 1999 (5th)
1999–00	Andrea Schöpp	Natalie Nessler	Heike Wieländer	Andrea Stock	Jane Boake-Cope	Rainer Schöpp	ECC 1999 (5th)
2000–01	Andrea Schöpp	Natalie Nessler	Heike Wieländer	Andrea Stock (ECC); Jane Boake-Cope (WCC)	Jane Boake-Cope (ECC); Andrea Stock (WCC)	Rainer Schöpp	ECC 2000 (4th); WCC 2001 (5th)
2001–02	Andrea Schöpp	Natalie Nessler	Heike Wieländer	Andrea Stock	Katja Weisser (ECC)	Rainer Schöpp	ECC 2001 (4th)
2001–02	Natalie Nessler	Sabine Belkofer	Heike Wieländer	Andrea Stock	Karin Fischer (OG); Katja Weisser (WCC)	Rainer Schöpp	OG 2002 (5th); WCC 2002 (9th)
2003	Cornelia Stock	Andrea Stock	Katja Weisser	Sabine Freiss		Dick Henderson	WUG 2003 (6th)
2004–05	Natalie Nessler	Andrea Stock	Sabine Belkofer-Kröhnert	Karin Fischer			
