= Stefan Rossler =

German curler

- Curler ♀

Team
- Curling club: EC Oberstdorf, Oberstdorf

Curling career
- Member Association: Germany
- World Championship: 1 (1990)
Medal record
Curling
German Women's Championship
Gold medal – first place	1990

Stefan "Steffi" Rossler is a former German curler.

At the national level, she is a 1990 German women's champion curler.

== Teams ==
Season	Skip	Third	Second	Lead	Alternate	Events
1989–90	Almut Hege-Schöll	Suzanne Fink	Stefan Rossler	Ina Räderer	Josefine Einsle (WCC)	GWCC 1990 (gold); WCC 1990 (5th)
