= 1990 World Women's Curling Championship =

Curling tournament

Coordinates: 59°37′35″N 16°31′42.8″E

1990 World Women's Curling Championships
- Host city: Västerås, Sweden
- Arena: Rocklundahallen
- Dates: April 1–7, 1990
- Winner: Norway
- Curling club: Oslo, Norway
- Skip: Dordi Nordby
- Third: Hanne Pettersen
- Second: Mette Halvorsen
- Lead: Anne Jøtun
- Finalist: Scotland (Carolyn Hutchison)

The 1990 World Women's Curling Championship was held at the Rocklundahallen in Västerås, Sweden from April 1–7.

The women's winner was team Norway, skipped by Dordi Nordby. Norway won its first Women's World Championship in Nordby's first season skipping the Norwegian women's team. She defeated Scotland in the final, 4–2, which was skipped by 21 year-old Carolyn Hutchison. Norway controlled the game, not letting Scotland play the "come around game".

The event was in conjunction with the 1990 World Men's Curling Championship and was televised in Canada on The Sports Network. Had a team gone undefeated, a four-team playoff would not have been necessary.

== Teams ==
Canada	Denmark	France	West Germany	Japan
Bayview CC, Thornhill Skip: Alison Goring; Third: Kristin Turcotte; Second: Andrea Lawes; Lead: Cheryl McPherson; Alternate: Anne Merklinger	Hvidovre CC, Hvidovre Skip: Helena Blach; Third: Malene Krause; Second: Lone Kristoffersen; Lead: Gitte Larsen	Megève CC, Megève Skip: Brigitte Lamy; Third: Paulette Sulpice; Second: Jocelyn Lhenry; Lead: Guylaine Fratucello; Alternate: Annick Mercier	EC Oberstdorf, Oberstdorf Skip: Almut Hege-Schöll; Third: Suzanne Fink; Second: Stefan Rossler; Lead: Ina Räderer; Alternate: Josefine Einsle	Kitami CC, Kitami Skip: Midori Kudoh; Third: Kaori Tatezaki; Second: Etsuko Ito; Lead: Mayumi Abe; Alternate: Mayumi Seguchi
Norway	Scotland	Sweden	Switzerland	United States
Snarøyen CC, Oslo Skip: Dordi Nordby; Third: Hanne Pettersen; Second: Mette Halvorsen; Lead: Anne Jøtun	Greenacres CC, Howwood Skip: Carolyn Hutchison; Third: Claire Milne; Second: Mairi Milne; Lead: Tara Brown	Frösö-Oden CK, Östersund Fourth: Helena Svensson; Skip: Lotta Giesenfeld; Second: Elisabeth Hansson; Lead: Annika Lööf; Alternate: Lena Mårdberg	Uitikon-Wald CC, Uitikon Skip: Brigitte Leutenegger; Third: Gisela Peter; Second: Marianne Gutknecht; Lead: Karin Leutenegger	Denver CC, Denver Skip: Bev Behnke; Third: Dawna Bennett; Second: Susan Anschuetz; Lead: Pam Finch; Alternate: Lisa Schoeneberg

== Round-robin standings ==
Country	Skip	W	L
Canada	Alison Goring	8	1
Scotland	Carolyn Hutchison	6	3
Denmark	Helena Blach	6	3
Norway	Dordi Nordby	6	3
West Germany	Almut Hege-Schöll	5	4
Sweden	Lotta Giesenfeld	5	4
Switzerland	Brigitte Leutenegger	4	5
United States	Bev Behnke	2	7
France	Brigitte Lamy	2	7
Japan*	Midori Kudoh	1	8

*First Appearance

== Round-robin results ==
=== Draw 1 ===
Sheet A	Final
Switzerland (Leutenegger)	6
Sweden (Giesenfeld)	7

Sheet B	Final
Denmark (Blach)	9
Japan (Kudoh)	4

Sheet C	Final
Norway (Nordby)	7
France (Lamy)	1

Sheet D	Final
United States (Behnke)	5
Scotland (Hutchison)	9

Sheet E	Final
West Germany (Hege-Schöll)	2
Canada (Goring)	6

=== Draw 2 ===
Sheet A	Final
West Germany (Hege-Schöll)	7
Norway (Nordby)	2

Sheet B	Final
France (Lamy)	2
Sweden (Giesenfeld)	7

Sheet C	Final
Switzerland (Leutenegger)	8
United States (Behnke)	3

Sheet D	Final
Canada (Goring)	8
Japan (Kudoh)	4

Sheet E	Final
Denmark (Blach)	5
Scotland (Hutchison)	8

=== Draw 3 ===
Sheet A	Final
France (Lamy)	7
Scotland (Hutchison)	6

Sheet B	Final
Switzerland (Leutenegger)	3
West Germany (Hege-Schöll)	7

Sheet C	Final
Canada (Goring)	7
Denmark (Blach)	8

Sheet D	Final
Sweden (Giesenfeld)	3
Norway (Dordi Nordby)	10

Sheet E	Final
Japan (Kudoh)	6
United States (Behnke)	3

=== Draw 4 ===
Sheet A	Final
United States (Behnke)	4
Canada (Goring)	7

Sheet B	Final
Norway (Nordby)	3
Denmark (Blach)	7

Sheet C	Final
Japan (Kudoh)	3
Scotland (Hutchison)	7

Sheet D	Final
Switzerland (Leutenegger)	10
France (Lamy)	5

Sheet E	Final
Sweden (Giesenfeld)	4
West Germany (Hege-Schöll)	6

=== Draw 5 ===
Sheet A	Final
Japan (Kudoh)	7
Switzerland (Leutenegger)	11

Sheet B	Final
Sweden (Giesenfeld)	2
Scotland (Hutchison)	7

Sheet C	Final
United States (Behnke)	2
Norway (Nordby)	7

Sheet D	Final
West Germany (Hege-Schöll)	4
Denmark (Blach)	8

Sheet E	Final
Canada (Goring)	9
France (Lamy)	3

=== Draw 6 ===
Sheet A	Final
Sweden (Giesenfeld)	7
Denmark (Blach)	3

Sheet B	Final
Canada (Goring)	7
Switzerland (Leutenegger)	6

Sheet C	Final
West Germany (Hege-Schöll)	8
Japan (Kudoh)	2

Sheet D	Final
France (Lamy)	6
United States (Behnke)	7

Sheet E	Final
Scotland (Hutchison)	1
Norway (Nordby)	6

=== Draw 7 ===
Sheet A	Final
Scotland (Hutchison)	6
West Germany (Hege-Schöll)	5

Sheet B	Final
Japan (Kudoh)	2
France (Lamy)	11

Sheet C	Final
Denmark (Blach)	4
Switzerland (Leutenegger)	7

Sheet D	Final
Norway (Nordby)	5
Canada (Goring)	6

Sheet E	Final
United States (Behnke)	3
Sweden (Giesenfeld)	6

=== Draw 8 ===
Sheet A	Final
Norway (Nordby)	8
Japan (Kudoh)	3

Sheet B	Final
West Germany (Hege-Schöll)	2
United States (Behnke)	5

Sheet C	Final
Sweden (Giesenfeld)	4
Canada (Goring)	5

Sheet D	Final
Scotland (Hutchison)	6
Switzerland (Leutenegger)	4

Sheet E	Final
France (Lamy)	6
Denmark (Blach)	4

=== Draw 9 ===
Sheet A	Final
Denmark (Blach)	6
United States (Behnke)	2

Sheet B	Final
Scotland (Hutchison)	4
Canada (Goring)	5

Sheet C	Final
France (Lamy)	4
West Germany (Hege-Schöll)	12

Sheet D	Final
Japan (Kudoh)	3
Sweden (Giesenfeld)	12

Sheet E	Final
Norway (Nordby)	6
Switzerland (Leutenegger)	3

== Tiebreaker ==
Team	Final
United States (Behnke)	8
France (Lamy)	5

== Playoffs ==
Semi-final
1	Canada	4
4	Norway	7
2	Scotland	8
3	Denmark	3

Final
4	Norway	4
2	Scotland	2

=== Final ===
Team	1	2	3	4	5	6	7	8	9	10	Final
Norway (Nordby)	0	0	2	0	0	0	2	0	0	X	4
Scotland (Hutchison)	0	0	0	0	0	1	0	0	1	X	2
