= Curling at the 2017 Winter Universiade =

Curling at the XXVIII Winter Universiade
- Venue: Almaty Arena
- Dates: 30 January – 7 February 2017

Curling at the 2017 Winter Universiade
- Host city: Almaty, Kazakhstan
- Arena: Almaty Arena
- Dates: January 30 - February 7
- Men's winner: Great Britain
- Skip: Bruce Mouat
- Third: Bobby Lammie
- Second: Gregor Cannon
- Lead: Derrick Sloan
- Alternate: Alasdair Schreiber
- Finalist: Sweden (Gustav Eskilsson)
- Women's winner: Canada
- Skip: Kelsey Rocque
- Third: Danielle Schmiemann
- Second: Taylor McDonald
- Lead: Taylore Theroux
- Finalist: Russia (Victoria Moiseeva)

Curling at the 2017 Winter Universiade was held from January 30 to February 7 at the Almaty Arena in Almaty, Kazakhstan.

== Medal summary ==
=== Medal table ===
Rank	Nation	Gold	Silver	Bronze	Total
1	Canada (CAN)	1	0	0	1
1	Great Britain (GBR)	1	0	0	1
3	Sweden (SWE)	0	1	1	2
4	Russia (RUS)	0	1	0	1
5	Norway (NOR)	0	0	1	1
Totals (5 entries)		2	2	2	6

=== Medalists ===
Event	Gold	Silver	Bronze
Men	United Kingdom (GBR); Bruce Mouat; Bobby Lammie; Gregor Cannon; Derrick Sloan; Alasdair Schreiber	Sweden (SWE); Patric Mabergs; Gustav Eskilsson; Fredrik Nyman; Johannes Patz	Norway (NOR); Steffen Walstad; Markus Høiberg; Magnus Nedregotten; Sander Rølvåg
Women	Canada (CAN); Kelsey Rocque; Danielle Schmiemann; Taylor McDonald; Taylore Theroux	Russia (RUS); Victoria Moiseeva; Uliana Vasilyeva; Galina Arsenkina; Yulia Portunova; Maria Duyunova	Sweden (SWE); Isabella Wranå; Jennie Wåhlin; Almida de Val; Fanny Sjöberg

== Men ==
=== Teams ===
Canada	Czech Republic	Great Britain	Japan	Kazakhstan
Skip: Aaron Squires; Third: Richard Krell; Second: Spencer Nutall; Lead: Fraser Reid; Alternate: Russell Cuddie; Coach: Jim Waite	Skip: Lukáš Klíma; Third: Marek Cernovsky; Second: Martin Jurík; Lead: Samuel Mokris; Alternate: Jakub Splavec; Coach: Karel Kubeska	Skip: Bruce Mouat; Third: Bobby Lammie; Second: Gregor Cannon; Lead: Derrick Sloan; Alternate: Alasdair Schreiber; Coach: Cate Brewster	Skip: Kohsuke Hirata; Third: Yoshiya Miura; Second: Hiromu Otani; Lead: Yuto Kamada; Alternate: Daiki Shikano; Coach: Hirofumi Kobayashi	Skip: Daniel Kim; Third: Abylaikhan Zhuzbay; Second: Dmitriy Garagul; Lead: Renas Akhmad; Alternate: Tamerlan Irgebay; Coach: Viktor Kim
South Korea	Norway	Russia	Sweden	United States
Skip: Seong Sehyeon; Third: Oh Eunsu; Second: Lee Kijeong; Lead: Lee Kibok; Alternate: Kim Chigu; Coach: Jang Banseok	Skip: Steffen Walstad; Third: Markus Høiberg; Second: Magnus Nedregotten; Lead: Sander Rølvåg Coach: Alexander Lindstroem	Skip: Alexey Timofeev; Third: Timur Gadzhikhanov; Second: Artur Razhabov; Lead: Artur Ali; Alternate: Evgeny Klimov; Coach: Aleksandr Kozyrev	Fourth: Patric Mabergs; Skip: Gustav Eskilsson; Second: Fredrik Nyman; Lead: Johannes Patz Coach: Flemming Patz	Skip: Alex Leichter; Third: Nate Clark; Second: Chris Bond; Lead: Calvin Weber; Alternate: Andrew Stopera; Coach: Frederick Leichter

(source:)

=== Round-robin standings ===
Final Round Robin Standings

Key
Teams to Playoffs

Country	Skip	W	L
Great Britain	Bruce Mouat	9	0
Sweden	Gustav Eskilsson	7	2
Czech Republic	Lukáš Klíma	6	3
Norway	Steffen Walstad	5	4
South Korea	Seong Sehyeon	4	5
United States	Alex Leichter	4	5
Canada	Aaron Squires	4	5
Russia	Alexey Timofeev	3	6
Japan	Kohsuke Hirata	3	6
Kazakhstan	Daniel Kim	0	9

=== Round-robin results ===
All draw times are listed in (UTC+6).

==== Draw 1 ====
Monday, January 30, 14:00

Sheet A	1	2	3	4	5	6	7	8	9	10	Final
South Korea 🔨	2	0	0	0	0	3	1	1	0	X	7
United States	0	0	2	0	1	0	0	0	1	X	4

Sheet B	1	2	3	4	5	6	7	8	9	10	Final
Canada 🔨	3	2	0	1	0	1	X	X	X	X	7
Kazakhstan	0	0	0	0	1	0	X	X	X	X	1

Sheet C	1	2	3	4	5	6	7	8	9	10	Final
Great Britain	0	1	0	1	0	2	0	1	1	3	9
Russia 🔨	1	0	1	0	2	0	1	0	0	0	5

Sheet D	1	2	3	4	5	6	7	8	9	10	Final
Sweden 🔨	2	1	2	1	0	2	3	X	X	X	11
Czech Republic	0	0	0	0	2	0	0	X	X	X	2

Sheet E	1	2	3	4	5	6	7	8	9	10	Final
Norway 🔨	0	2	0	0	2	0	0	2	0	0	6
Japan	0	0	0	1	0	2	1	0	2	1	7

==== Draw 2 ====
Tuesday, January 31, 9:00

Sheet A	1	2	3	4	5	6	7	8	9	10	Final
Kazakhstan	0	0	0	1	0	0	X	X	X	X	1
Sweden 🔨	1	1	0	0	1	5	X	X	X	X	8

Sheet B	1	2	3	4	5	6	7	8	9	10	Final
United States 🔨	0	0	0	1	0	1	0	0	1	0	3
Czech Republic	0	0	0	0	1	0	3	0	0	0	4

Sheet C	1	2	3	4	5	6	7	8	9	10	Final
Norway	2	0	4	0	0	2	0	4	X	X	12
South Korea 🔨	0	2	0	1	0	0	1	0	X	X	4

Sheet D	1	2	3	4	5	6	7	8	9	10	Final
Japan 🔨	0	0	1	0	3	0	0	0	0	X	4
Russia	0	0	0	1	0	1	1	1	3	X	7

Sheet E	1	2	3	4	5	6	7	8	9	10	Final
Canada	0	1	0	1	0	1	0	1	0	X	4
Great Britain 🔨	3	0	1	0	1	0	1	0	3	X	9

==== Draw 3 ====
Tuesday, January 31, 19:00

Sheet A	1	2	3	4	5	6	7	8	9	10	Final
Russia 🔨	2	0	0	0	1	0	0	1	0	0	4
Canada	0	0	2	1	0	1	0	0	0	1	5

Sheet B	1	2	3	4	5	6	7	8	9	10	Final
South Korea 🔨	0	1	0	2	0	1	0	0	0	3	7
Japan	0	0	2	0	1	0	1	1	1	0	6

Sheet C	1	2	3	4	5	6	7	8	9	10	Final
United States	0	4	0	0	2	0	0	0	0	1	7
Sweden 🔨	0	0	2	0	0	1	1	1	1	0	6

Sheet D	1	2	3	4	5	6	7	8	9	10	Final
Great Britain	0	0	0	0	2	0	1	1	2	1	7
Norway 🔨	0	1	0	2	0	1	0	0	0	0	4

Sheet E	1	2	3	4	5	6	7	8	9	10	Final
Kazakhstan	0	0	0	0	1	0	1	X	X	X	2
Czech Republic 🔨	3	1	2	0	0	4	0	X	X	X	10

==== Draw 4 ====
Wednesday, February 1, 14:00

Sheet A	1	2	3	4	5	6	7	8	9	10	Final
Czech Republic	0	1	0	0	0	0	1	0	X	X	2
Norway 🔨	0	0	4	1	1	0	0	1	X	X	7

Sheet B	1	2	3	4	5	6	7	8	9	10	Final
Great Britain 🔨	2	0	0	3	2	0	1	X	X	X	8
Sweden	0	1	1	0	0	1	0	X	X	X	3

Sheet C	1	2	3	4	5	6	7	8	9	10	Final
Japan 🔨	4	0	0	1	1	0	0	1	0	X	7
Kazakhstan	0	1	0	0	0	1	0	0	1	X	3

Sheet D	1	2	3	4	5	6	7	8	9	10	11	Final
Russia 🔨	1	0	0	2	0	0	1	0	1	0	1	6
South Korea	0	1	0	0	1	0	0	2	0	1	0	5

Sheet E	1	2	3	4	5	6	7	8	9	10	Final
United States 🔨	0	0	1	0	0	2	0	2	0	1	6
Canada	0	0	0	0	2	0	2	0	0	0	4

==== Draw 5 ====
Thursday, February 2, 9:00

Sheet A	1	2	3	4	5	6	7	8	9	10	Final
Great Britain 🔨	2	5	1	2	0	0	X	X	X	X	10
Kazakhstan	0	0	0	0	0	1	X	X	X	X	1

Sheet B	1	2	3	4	5	6	7	8	9	10	Final
Norway	0	0	1	1	2	0	0	1	0	0	5
United States 🔨	0	0	0	0	0	1	0	0	2	1	4

Sheet C	1	2	3	4	5	6	7	8	9	10	11	Final
South Korea	0	2	0	1	0	1	1	0	2	0	0	7
Czech Republic 🔨	1	0	1	0	2	0	0	1	0	2	1	8

Sheet D	1	2	3	4	5	6	7	8	9	10	Final
Canada 🔨	1	0	2	1	1	0	0	1	0	0	6
Japan	0	1	0	0	0	2	0	0	1	1	5

Sheet E	1	2	3	4	5	6	7	8	9	10	Final
Sweden 🔨	2	0	2	0	1	0	4	2	X	X	11
Russia	0	2	0	2	0	2	0	0	X	X	6

==== Draw 6 ====
Thursday, February 2, 19:00

Sheet A	1	2	3	4	5	6	7	8	9	10	Final
Norway	1	0	1	1	0	2	1	0	1	X	7
Russia 🔨	0	1	0	0	1	0	0	2	0	X	4

Sheet B	1	2	3	4	5	6	7	8	9	10	Final
Kazakhstan	0	1	0	0	1	0	X	X	X	X	2
South Korea 🔨	2	0	4	3	0	4	X	X	X	X	13

Sheet C	1	2	3	4	5	6	7	8	9	10	Final
Sweden 🔨	0	0	2	0	0	2	0	2	1	0	7
Canada	0	0	0	1	0	0	3	0	0	1	5

Sheet D	1	2	3	4	5	6	7	8	9	10	Final
Czech Republic 🔨	0	1	0	0	2	0	0	0	1	0	4
Great Britain	1	0	0	2	0	0	1	0	0	1	5

Sheet E	1	2	3	4	5	6	7	8	9	10	Final
Japan	0	0	2	2	0	2	0	0	1	0	7
United States 🔨	0	1	0	0	1	0	1	1	0	1	5

==== Draw 7 ====
Friday, February 3, 14:00

Sheet A	1	2	3	4	5	6	7	8	9	10	Final
Canada 🔨	1	0	0	1	0	0	0	X	X	X	2
Czech Republic	0	2	0	0	1	4	1	X	X	X	8

Sheet B	1	2	3	4	5	6	7	8	9	10	Final
Japan	0	1	0	0	2	0	1	X	X	X	4
Great Britain 🔨	3	0	4	1	0	2	0	X	X	X	10

Sheet C	1	2	3	4	5	6	7	8	9	10	Final
Russia 🔨	1	0	0	1	1	0	1	0	1	X	5
United States	0	0	3	0	0	2	0	2	0	X	7

Sheet D	1	2	3	4	5	6	7	8	9	10	Final
Norway 🔨	4	1	3	0	0	0	X	X	X	X	8
Kazakhstan	0	0	0	0	0	0	X	X	X	X	0

Sheet E	1	2	3	4	5	6	7	8	9	10	Final
South Korea 🔨	0	1	0	1	0	0	1	2	0	0	5
Sweden	0	0	2	0	0	1	0	0	4	1	8

==== Draw 8 ====
Saturday, February 4, 9:00

Sheet A	1	2	3	4	5	6	7	8	9	10	Final
United States	0	4	0	0	0	0	2	1	0	X	7
Great Britain 🔨	2	0	2	3	1	1	0	0	0	X	9

Sheet B	1	2	3	4	5	6	7	8	9	10	Final
Sweden 🔨	1	1	0	3	0	1	1	0	0	X	7
Norway	0	0	1	0	2	0	0	1	1	X	5

Sheet C	1	2	3	4	5	6	7	8	9	10	Final
Czech Republic	2	0	0	1	0	2	1	2	X	X	8
Japan 🔨	0	0	2	0	1	0	0	0	X	X	3

Sheet D	1	2	3	4	5	6	7	8	9	10	Final
South Korea	1	0	5	0	0	0	1	0	1	X	8
Canada 🔨	0	1	0	0	1	1	0	1	0	X	4

Sheet E	1	2	3	4	5	6	7	8	9	10	Final
Russia 🔨	3	0	1	1	2	1	X	X	X	X	8
Kazakhstan	0	1	0	0	0	0	X	X	X	X	1

==== Draw 9 ====
Saturday, February 4, 19:00

Sheet A	1	2	3	4	5	6	7	8	9	10	Final
Sweden 🔨	0	2	0	0	4	0	0	4	0	X	10
Japan	0	0	0	1	0	1	0	0	1	X	3

Sheet B	1	2	3	4	5	6	7	8	9	10	Final
Czech Republic 🔨	0	1	2	1	0	2	0	1	1	X	8
Russia	1	0	0	0	1	0	3	0	0	X	5

Sheet C	1	2	3	4	5	6	7	8	9	10	Final
Canada	0	2	1	0	0	3	0	0	2	1	9
Norway 🔨	1	0	0	0	1	0	2	1	0	0	5

Sheet D	1	2	3	4	5	6	7	8	9	10	Final
Kazakhstan	1	0	0	1	1	0	1	0	X	X	4
United States 🔨	0	2	2	0	0	3	0	3	X	X	10

Sheet E	1	2	3	4	5	6	7	8	9	10	Final
Great Britain	0	0	1	0	3	0	0	1	0	X	5
South Korea 🔨	1	0	0	1	0	1	0	0	0	X	3

=== Playoffs ===
Semifinals
1	Great Britain	9
4	Norway	8
2	Sweden	8
3	Czech Republic	6

Gold Medal Game
1	Great Britain	8
2	Sweden	6
Bronze Medal Game
4	Norway	7
3	Czech Republic	3

==== Semifinals ====
Monday, February 6, 9:00

Sheet A	1	2	3	4	5	6	7	8	9	10	Final
Norway	0	2	0	3	0	1	0	0	2	0	8
Great Britain 🔨	1	0	1	0	1	0	3	1	0	2	9

Sheet E	1	2	3	4	5	6	7	8	9	10	Final
Sweden 🔨	0	2	0	1	0	0	2	0	2	1	8
Czech Republic	0	0	1	0	1	2	0	2	0	0	6

==== Bronze Medal Game ====
Monday, February 6, 16:00

Sheet D	1	2	3	4	5	6	7	8	9	10	Final
Norway	0	3	0	1	0	1	2	0	X	X	7
Czech Republic 🔨	1	0	1	0	0	0	0	1	X	X	3

==== Gold Medal Game ====
Tuesday, February 7, 14:00

Sheet B	1	2	3	4	5	6	7	8	9	10	Final
Sweden	0	0	2	0	0	0	2	2	0	0	6
Great Britain 🔨	2	2	0	0	1	0	0	0	2	1	8

=== Final standings ===
Pos	Team	Skip	G	W	L
1st place, gold medalist(s)	Great Britain	Bruce Mouat	11	11	0
2nd place, silver medalist(s)	Sweden	Gustav Eskilsson	11	8	3
3rd place, bronze medalist(s)	Norway	Steffen Walstad	11	6	5
4	Czech Republic	Lukáš Klíma	11	6	5
5	South Korea	Seong Sehyeon	9	4	5
6	United States	Alex Leichter	9	4	5
7	Canada	Aaron Squires	9	4	5
8	Russia	Alexey Timofeev	9	3	6
9	Japan	Kohsuke Hirata	9	3	6
10	Kazakhstan	Daniel Kim	9	0	9

== Women ==
=== Teams ===
Canada	China	Germany	Great Britain	Kazakhstan
Skip: Kelsey Rocque; Third: Danielle Schmiemann; Second: Taylor McDonald; Lead: Taylore Theroux Coach: Garry Coderre	Skip: Mei Jie; Third: Ma Jingyi; Second: Yin Yanxin; Lead: Sun Chengyu; Alternate: Cao Ying; Coach: Yue Qingshuang	Skip: Maike Beer; Third: Claudia Beer; Second: Emira Abbes; Lead: Nicole Muskatewitz Coach: Sven Goldemann	Skip: Gina Aitken; Third: Rowena Kerr; Second: Rachael Halliday; Lead: Rachel Hannen; Alternate: Angharad Ward; Coach: Mairi Milne	Skip: Ramina Yunicheva; Third: Anastassiya Surgay; Second: Kamila Bakanova; Lead: Sitora Alliyarova; Alternate: Zarina Kakharova; Coach: Olga Ten
South Korea	Norway	Russia	Sweden	Switzerland
Skip: Kim Eun-Jung; Third: Kim Kyeong-Ae; Second: Kim Seon-Yeong; Lead: Kim Yeong-Mi Coach: Kim Min-jung	Skip: Pia Trulsen; Third: Ingvild Skaga; Second: Mari Forbregd; Lead: Stine Haalien Coach: Petter Moe	Skip: Victoria Moiseeva; Third: Uliana Vasilyeva; Second: Galina Arsenkina; Lead: Yulia Portunova; Alternate: Maria Duyunova; Coach: Sergei Belanov	Skip: Isabella Wranå; Third: Jennie Wåhlin; Second: Almida de Val; Lead: Fanny Sjöberg Coach: Alison Kreviazuk	Fourth: Briar Hürlimann; Skip: Elena Stern; Second: Anna Stern; Lead: Céline Koller; Alternate: Noelle Iseli; Coach: Pascal Hess

(sources:)

=== Round-robin standings ===
Final Round Robin Standings

Key
Teams to Playoffs
Teams to Tiebreaker

Country	Skip	W	L
Canada	Kelsey Rocque	7	2
Russia	Victoria Moiseeva	6	3
Sweden	Isabella Wranå	6	3
Great Britain	Gina Aitken	6	3
Switzerland	Elena Stern	6	3
South Korea	Kim Eun-jung	5	4
China	Mei Jie	5	4
Germany	Maike Beer	3	6
Norway	Pia Trulsen	1	8
Kazakhstan	Ramina Yunicheva	0	9

=== Round-robin results ===
==== Draw 1 ====
Monday, January 30, 9:00

Sheet A	1	2	3	4	5	6	7	8	9	10	Final
Sweden 🔨	1	0	0	3	0	0	2	0	0	0	6
Switzerland	0	0	1	0	3	0	0	2	0	1	7

Sheet B	1	2	3	4	5	6	7	8	9	10	Final
Great Britain	0	0	0	1	0	1	0	0	1	X	3
Russia 🔨	2	1	1	0	1	0	2	0	0	X	7

Sheet C	1	2	3	4	5	6	7	8	9	10	Final
Kazakhstan	0	0	0	1	0	1	0	X	X	X	2
Germany 🔨	3	1	1	0	4	0	4	X	X	X	13

Sheet D	1	2	3	4	5	6	7	8	9	10	Final
Norway	0	0	1	2	1	0	0	0	2	0	6
South Korea 🔨	0	1	0	0	0	3	1	3	0	1	9

Sheet E	1	2	3	4	5	6	7	8	9	10	11	Final
China 🔨	2	0	2	1	0	1	0	0	0	2	1	9
Canada	0	1	0	0	2	0	3	1	1	0	0	8

==== Draw 2 ====
Monday, January 30, 19:00

Sheet A	1	2	3	4	5	6	7	8	9	10	Final
Russia 🔨	2	0	1	0	2	2	0	2	X	X	9
Norway	0	1	0	1	0	0	1	0	X	X	3

Sheet B	1	2	3	4	5	6	7	8	9	10	Final
Switzerland	0	0	0	2	0	2	0	0	2	2	8
South Korea 🔨	0	2	1	0	2	0	2	0	0	0	7

Sheet C	1	2	3	4	5	6	7	8	9	10	Final
China	0	0	0	1	0	1	1	0	1	1	5
Sweden 🔨	2	0	0	0	1	0	0	3	0	0	6

Sheet D	1	2	3	4	5	6	7	8	9	10	Final
Canada 🔨	0	0	0	1	0	2	0	2	1	X	6
Germany	0	0	0	0	1	0	1	0	0	X	2

Sheet E	1	2	3	4	5	6	7	8	9	10	Final
Great Britain	0	4	1	0	2	0	3	X	X	X	10
Kazakhstan 🔨	1	0	0	2	0	1	0	X	X	X	4

==== Draw 3 ====
Tuesday, January 31, 14:00

Sheet A	1	2	3	4	5	6	7	8	9	10	Final
Germany 🔨	0	2	0	1	0	0	2	0	2	0	7
Great Britain	0	0	3	0	0	2	0	1	0	2	8

Sheet B	1	2	3	4	5	6	7	8	9	10	Final
Sweden	0	0	0	0	0	2	0	0	1	0	3
Canada 🔨	0	2	0	0	1	0	1	0	0	1	5

Sheet C	1	2	3	4	5	6	7	8	9	10	Final
Switzerland 🔨	0	1	1	0	2	0	1	0	1	1	7
Norway	0	0	0	1	0	2	0	1	0	0	4

Sheet D	1	2	3	4	5	6	7	8	9	10	Final
Kazakhstan	0	0	0	0	0	0	X	X	X	X	0
China 🔨	1	1	1	2	3	2	X	X	X	X	10

Sheet E	1	2	3	4	5	6	7	8	9	10	Final
Russia 🔨	0	1	0	1	0	2	0	0	0	X	4
South Korea	0	0	2	0	2	0	2	1	0	X	7

==== Draw 4 ====
Wednesday, February 1, 9:00

Sheet A	1	2	3	4	5	6	7	8	9	10	Final
South Korea	1	0	0	2	0	2	0	3	0	1	9
China 🔨	0	1	1	0	3	0	2	0	1	0	8

Sheet B	1	2	3	4	5	6	7	8	9	10	Final
Kazakhstan 🔨	0	1	0	0	0	3	0	X	X	X	4
Norway	3	0	3	1	2	0	1	X	X	X	10

Sheet C	1	2	3	4	5	6	7	8	9	10	Final
Canada 🔨	0	2	0	1	0	2	0	2	0	X	7
Russia	0	0	1	0	1	0	1	0	1	X	4

Sheet D	1	2	3	4	5	6	7	8	9	10	11	Final
Germany	0	3	0	1	0	3	0	0	0	1	0	8
Sweden 🔨	2	0	2	0	0	0	3	1	0	0	4	12

Sheet E	1	2	3	4	5	6	7	8	9	10	Final
Switzerland	0	0	0	1	1	0	1	0	2	0	5
Great Britain 🔨	0	0	1	0	0	2	0	1	0	2	6

==== Draw 5 ====
Wednesday, February 1, 19:00

Sheet A	1	2	3	4	5	6	7	8	9	10	Final
Kazakhstan	0	0	1	0	0	0	X	X	X	X	1
Russia 🔨	5	3	0	1	1	4	X	X	X	X	14

Sheet B	1	2	3	4	5	6	7	8	9	10	Final
China	0	0	0	2	0	0	0	1	0	1	4
Switzerland 🔨	0	0	3	0	0	1	1	0	1	0	6

Sheet C	1	2	3	4	5	6	7	8	9	10	Final
Sweden 🔨	0	1	0	0	2	0	0	0	1	2	6
South Korea	0	0	2	1	0	0	0	2	0	0	5

Sheet D	1	2	3	4	5	6	7	8	9	10	Final
Great Britain 🔨	1	0	1	0	2	0	2	0	3	X	9
Canada	0	1	0	1	0	1	0	2	0	X	5

Sheet E	1	2	3	4	5	6	7	8	9	10	Final
Norway 🔨	0	0	0	1	0	1	0	0	X	X	2
Germany	1	2	1	0	3	0	2	1	X	X	10

==== Draw 6 ====
Thursday, February 2, 14:00

Sheet A	1	2	3	4	5	6	7	8	9	10	Final
China 🔨	0	0	1	0	0	2	0	3	0	1	7
Germany	0	1	0	3	1	0	1	0	0	0	6

Sheet B	1	2	3	4	5	6	7	8	9	10	Final
Russia	0	0	3	0	0	0	2	1	0	0	6
Sweden 🔨	0	1	0	1	1	0	0	0	1	1	5

Sheet C	1	2	3	4	5	6	7	8	9	10	Final
Norway 🔨	0	0	0	2	2	1	0	0	1	0	6
Great Britain	0	1	1	0	0	0	2	1	0	2	7

Sheet D	1	2	3	4	5	6	7	8	9	10	Final
South Korea 🔨	7	0	4	0	2	1	X	X	X	X	14
Kazakhstan	0	1	0	1	0	0	X	X	X	X	2

Sheet E	1	2	3	4	5	6	7	8	9	10	11	Final
Canada 🔨	0	1	0	2	1	0	0	1	0	0	1	6
Switzerland	0	0	0	0	0	0	2	0	2	1	0	5

==== Draw 7 ====
Friday, February 3, 9:00

Sheet A	1	2	3	4	5	6	7	8	9	10	Final
Great Britain	0	1	0	2	0	1	0	3	0	2	9
South Korea 🔨	1	0	2	0	1	0	1	0	1	0	6

Sheet B	1	2	3	4	5	6	7	8	9	10	Final
Canada 🔨	3	1	0	6	1	2	X	X	X	X	13
Kazakhstan	0	0	2	0	0	0	X	X	X	X	2

Sheet C	1	2	3	4	5	6	7	8	9	10	11	Final
Germany	0	0	0	0	1	0	0	1	1	1	0	4
Switzerland 🔨	0	1	0	2	0	0	1	0	0	0	1	5

Sheet D	1	2	3	4	5	6	7	8	9	10	Final
China	0	2	0	1	0	0	2	0	1	1	7
Russia 🔨	2	0	2	0	1	2	0	1	0	0	8

Sheet E	1	2	3	4	5	6	7	8	9	10	Final
Sweden 🔨	0	3	0	3	4	0	2	X	X	X	12
Norway	0	0	1	0	0	1	0	X	X	X	2

==== Draw 8 ====
Friday, February 3, 19:00

Sheet A	1	2	3	4	5	6	7	8	9	10	Final
Switzerland	0	1	1	0	4	2	X	X	X	X	8
Kazakhstan 🔨	1	0	0	2	0	0	X	X	X	X	3

Sheet B	1	2	3	4	5	6	7	8	9	10	Final
Norway 🔨	2	0	1	0	0	0	2	0	1	0	6
China	0	2	0	3	1	1	0	1	0	1	9

Sheet C	1	2	3	4	5	6	7	8	9	10	Final
South Korea	0	0	0	1	0	0	1	0	0	X	2
Canada 🔨	0	0	1	0	2	0	0	2	3	X	8

Sheet D	1	2	3	4	5	6	7	8	9	10	Final
Sweden 🔨	0	2	0	1	0	2	0	2	0	1	8
Great Britain	0	0	1	0	2	0	2	0	2	0	7

Sheet E	1	2	3	4	5	6	7	8	9	10	Final
Germany 🔨	3	0	1	2	0	0	1	0	1	X	8
Russia	0	1	0	0	2	1	0	2	0	X	6

==== Draw 9 ====
Saturday, February 4, 14:00

Sheet A	1	2	3	4	5	6	7	8	9	10	Final
Norway 🔨	2	1	0	1	0	0	1	0	0	X	5
Canada	0	0	3	0	1	2	0	2	2	X	10

Sheet B	1	2	3	4	5	6	7	8	9	10	Final
South Korea 🔨	3	0	1	0	2	0	0	0	2	X	8
Germany	0	1	0	2	0	0	0	1	0	X	4

Sheet C	1	2	3	4	5	6	7	8	9	10	Final
Great Britain 🔨	0	0	2	0	1	0	0	0	1	0	4
China	0	1	0	2	0	0	2	1	0	2	8

Sheet D	1	2	3	4	5	6	7	8	9	10	Final
Russia 🔨	0	1	1	0	0	4	0	3	X	X	9
Switzerland	1	0	0	0	0	0	2	0	X	X	3

Sheet E	1	2	3	4	5	6	7	8	9	10	Final
Kazakhstan 🔨	2	0	0	2	0	1	0	0	X	X	5
Sweden	0	4	1	0	3	0	1	4	X	X	13

=== Tiebreaker ===
Sunday, February 5, 9:00

Sheet E	1	2	3	4	5	6	7	8	9	10	Final
Switzerland	0	1	0	2	0	1	0	0	2	X	6
Great Britain 🔨	0	0	2	0	0	0	2	0	0	X	4

=== Playoffs ===
Semifinals
1	Canada	7
4	Sweden	4
2	Russia	8
3	Switzerland	7

Gold Medal Game
1	Canada	8
2	Russia	3
Bronze Medal Game
4	Sweden	6
3	Switzerland	3

==== Semifinals ====
Monday, February 6, 9:00

Sheet C	1	2	3	4	5	6	7	8	9	10	11	Final
Switzerland	0	0	3	0	0	1	0	2	0	1	0	7
Russia 🔨	0	3	0	2	0	0	1	0	1	0	1	8

Sheet D	1	2	3	4	5	6	7	8	9	10	Final
Sweden	0	0	0	1	0	1	0	2	0	X	4
Canada 🔨	0	1	1	0	2	0	2	0	1	X	7

==== Bronze Medal Game ====
Monday, February 6, 16:00

Sheet B	1	2	3	4	5	6	7	8	9	10	Final
Sweden	0	0	3	0	0	1	0	1	0	1	6
Switzerland 🔨	0	0	0	1	0	0	1	0	1	0	3

==== Gold Medal Game ====
Tuesday, February 7, 9:00

Sheet B	1	2	3	4	5	6	7	8	9	10	Final
Russia 🔨	0	0	0	1	0	0	2	0	0	X	3
Canada	0	2	2	0	1	0	0	1	2	X	8

=== Final standings ===
Pos	Team	Skip	G	W	L
1st place, gold medalist(s)	Canada	Kelsey Rocque	11	9	2
2nd place, silver medalist(s)	Russia	Victoria Moiseeva	11	7	4
3rd place, bronze medalist(s)	Sweden	Isabella Wranå	11	7	4
4	Switzerland	Elena Stern	12	7	5
5	Great Britain	Gina Aitken	10	6	4
6	South Korea	Kim Eun-jung	9	5	4
7	China	Mei Jie	9	5	4
8	Germany	Maike Beer	9	3	6
9	Norway	Pia Trulsen	9	1	8
10	Kazakhstan	Ramina Yunicheva	9	0	9
