= 2017 World Junior B Curling Championships =

- Host city: Östersund, Sweden
- Arena: Östersund Arena
- Dates: January 3–10
- Men's winner: China
- Skip: Wang Zhiyu
- Third: Yuan Mingjie
- Second: Cheng Kuo
- Lead: Li Bongho
- Alternate: Kang Xinlong
- Coach: Li Hongchen
- Finalist: Turkey (Uğurcan Karagöz)
- Women's winner: Scotland
- Skip: Sophie Jackson
- Third: Naomi Brown
- Second: Mili Smith
- Lead: Sophie Sinclair
- Alternate: Laura Barr
- Coach: Cate Brewster
- Finalist: Turkey (Dilşat Yıldız)

The 2017 World Junior B Curling Championships was held from January 3 to 10 at the Östersund Arena in Östersund, Sweden. The top three men’s and women’s teams at the World Junior B Curling Championships would qualify for the 2017 World Junior Curling Championships.

== Men ==
=== Round-robin standings ===
Final Round Robin Standings

Key
Teams to Playoffs
Teams to Tiebreaker

Group A	Skip	W	L
Italy	Marco Onnis	5	1
Latvia	Janis Bremanis	5	1
Czech Republic	Pavel Mares	4	2
Russia	Alexander Eremin	4	2
Lithuania	Povilas Cepulis	2	4
Australia	Mitchell Thomas	1	5
Austria	Martin Seiwald	0	6

Group B	Skip	W	L
China	Wang Zhiyu	7	0
Denmark	Simon Haubjerg	5	2
Slovenia	Stefan Sever	4	3
Spain	Gontzal Garcia Vez	4	3
Slovakia	Jakub Cervenka	3	4
Hungary	Daniel Kalocsay	3	4
Netherlands	Olaf Bolkenbaas	2	5
England	Jake Barker	0	7

Group C	Skip	W	L
Germany	Marc Muskatewitz	7	0
Turkey	Uğurcan Karagöz	5	2
Poland	Konrad Stych	4	3
France	Theo Ducroz	4	3
Japan	Kanya Shimizuno	3	4
New Zealand	Matthew Neilson	3	4
Finland	Melker Lundberg	2	5
Hong Kong	Derek Leung	0	7

=== Tiebreaker Games ===
January 9, 08:00

Sheet A	1	2	3	4	5	6	7	8	Final
Czech Republic	0	1	0	0	3	0	3	X	7
Russia	1	0	0	1	0	1	0	X	3

Sheet D	1	2	3	4	5	6	7	8	Final
Spain	0	0	1	1	2	0	1	0	5
Slovenia	3	2	0	0	0	1	0	1	7

Sheet C	1	2	3	4	5	6	7	8	Final
Poland	3	0	2	0	1	0	0	1	7
France	0	1	0	1	0	1	1	0	4

=== Qualification Game ===
January 9, 12:00

Sheet B	1	2	3	4	5	6	7	8	9	Final
Poland	0	1	0	0	3	0	2	1	1	8
Czech Republic	0	0	3	2	0	2	0	0	0	7

=== Playoffs ===
Quarterfinals
1	Germany	6
9	Poland	2
5	Turkey	8
4	Denmark	4
3	China	9
6	Latvia	3
7	Slovenia	3
2	Italy	6

Semifinals
1	Germany	3
5	Turkey	7
3	China	7
2	Italy	1

Gold-medal game
5	Turkey	2
3	China	5

Bronze-medal game
1	Germany	2
2	Italy	5

==== Quarterfinals ====
January 9, 16:00

Sheet B	1	2	3	4	5	6	7	8	Final
Latvia	0	2	0	0	1	0	X	X	3
China	2	0	1	3	0	3	X	X	9

Sheet C	1	2	3	4	5	6	7	8	Final
Turkey	5	0	2	0	1	0	X	X	8
Denmark	0	1	0	2	0	1	X	X	4

Sheet D	1	2	3	4	5	6	7	8	Final
Italy	0	2	1	0	0	1	0	2	6
Slovenia	2	0	0	1	0	0	0	0	3

Sheet E	1	2	3	4	5	6	7	8	Final
Poland	0	0	1	0	0	0	1	X	2
Germany	1	1	0	0	0	4	0	X	6

==== Semifinals ====
January 10, 9:00

Sheet D	1	2	3	4	5	6	7	8	Final
Turkey	1	0	0	1	1	0	2	2	7
Germany	0	1	1	0	0	1	0	0	3

Sheet E	1	2	3	4	5	6	7	8	Final
China	0	2	0	2	2	1	X	X	7
Italy	0	0	1	0	0	0	X	X	1

==== Bronze-medal game ====
January 10, 14:00

Sheet B	1	2	3	4	5	6	7	8	Final
Germany	1	0	1	0	0	0	0	X	2
Italy	0	1	0	0	1	0	3	X	5

==== Gold-medal game ====
January 10, 14:00

Sheet C	1	2	3	4	5	6	7	8	Final
Turkey	0	1	0	0	0	1	0	X	2
China	1	0	1	2	1	0	0	X	5

== Women ==
=== Round-robin standings ===
Final Round Robin Standings

Key
Teams to Playoffs
Teams to Tiebreaker

Group A	Skip	W	L
Turkey	Dilşat Yıldız	6	0
Japan	Misaki Tanaka	5	1
Poland	Aneta Lipinska	3	3
Finland	Noora Suuripää	3	3
Italy	Angela Romei	2	4
Austria	Celine Moser	1	5
Slovenia	Nika Cerne	1	5

Group B	Skip	W	L
Scotland	Sophie Jackson	6	0
Norway	Maia Ramsfjell	4	2
Czech Republic	Kristina Podrabska	4	2
Latvia	Madara Bremane	4	2
Estonia	Triin Madisson	2	4
Romania	Iulia Ioana Traila	1	5
Spain	Alicia Munte Kinsella	0	6

Group C	Skip	W	L
China	Zhang Lijun	6	0
Germany	Maike Beer	5	1
Slovakia	Silvia Sykorova	4	2
England	Lucy Sparks	3	3
Denmark	Jasmin Lander	2	4
New Zealand	Jessica Smith	1	5
Australia	Samantha Jeffs	0	6

=== Tiebreaker Games ===
January 9, 8:00

Sheet B	1	2	3	4	5	6	7	8	Final
Czech Republic	0	1	0	1	1	1	1	X	5
Latvia	1	0	1	0	0	0	0	X	2

Sheet E	1	2	3	4	5	6	7	8	Final
Finland	0	0	0	3	0	1	0	0	4
Poland	1	1	0	0	1	0	1	1	5

=== Qualification Game ===
January 9, 12:00

Sheet F	1	2	3	4	5	6	7	8	Final
Poland	2	1	0	0	1	0	0	2	6
Slovakia	0	0	3	2	0	0	3	0	8

=== Playoffs ===
Quarterfinals
1	Turkey	6
9	Slovakia	2
5	Japan	9
4	Czech Republic	4
3	China	5
6	Germany	2
7	Norway	2
2	Scotland	8

Semifinals
1	Turkey	6
5	Japan	4
3	China	2
2	Scotland	6

Gold-medal game
1	Turkey	4
2	Scotland	7

Bronze-medal game
5	Japan	6
3	China	3

==== Quarterfinals ====
January 9, 20:00

Sheet B	1	2	3	4	5	6	7	8	Final
Scotland	1	0	1	3	1	0	2	X	8
Norway	0	1	0	0	0	1	0	X	2

Sheet C	1	2	3	4	5	6	7	8	Final
Turkey	0	2	0	0	1	0	3	X	6
Slovakia	0	0	0	1	0	1	0	X	2

Sheet D	1	2	3	4	5	6	7	8	Final
China	2	0	1	0	0	1	0	1	5
Germany	0	0	0	1	1	0	1	0	3

Sheet E	1	2	3	4	5	6	7	8	Final
Czech Republic	0	0	0	0	2	0	2	X	4
Japan	3	1	2	2	0	1	0	X	9

==== Semifinals ====
January 10, 9:00

Sheet B	1	2	3	4	5	6	7	8	Final
Japan	0	2	0	2	0	0	0	X	4
Turkey	3	0	1	0	1	0	1	X	6

Sheet C	1	2	3	4	5	6	7	8	Final
Scotland	0	0	2	1	1	1	1	X	6
China	1	1	0	0	0	0	0	X	2

==== Bronze-medal game ====
January 10, 14:00

Sheet E	1	2	3	4	5	6	7	8	Final
China	1	0	0	0	1	0	1	0	3
Japan	0	2	1	1	0	1	0	1	6

==== Gold-medal game ====
January 10, 14:00

Sheet D	1	2	3	4	5	6	7	8	Final
Turkey	0	1	0	0	2	0	1	X	4
Scotland	2	0	1	3	0	1	0	X	7
