= Josephine Obermann =

German curler

- Curler ♀
- Born: 15 June 1983 (age 43); Rastatt, West Germany

Team
- Curling club: Baden Hills Golf & Curling Club, CC Schwenningen, CC Füssen

Curling career
- Member Association: Germany
- World Championship: 2 (2017, 2018)
- World Mixed Championship: 1 (2023)
- European Championship: 3 (2002, 2016, 2017)
- Other appearances: World Junior Championships: 2 (2000, 2002), Winter Universiade: 1 (2011); European Mixed Championship: 1 (2011)
Medal record
Curling
European Mixed Championship
| Silver medal – second place | 2011 Tårnby |

Josephine Obermann (born 15 June 1983 in Rastatt) is a German curler.

At the international level, she won a silver medal at the 2011 European Mixed Curling Championship.

== Teams ==
=== Women's ===
| Season | Skip | Third | Second | Lead | Alternate | Coach | Events |
|---|---|---|---|---|---|---|---|
| 1999–00 | Carmen Fessler | Josephine Obermann | Claudia Fessler | Sina Frey | Navina Kaden | Christian Unterstab | WJCC 2000 (9th) |
| 2001–02 | Daniela Jentsch | Cornelia Stock | Josephine Obermann | Lisa Hammer | Sina Frey | Marcus Angrick | WJCC 2002 (5th) |
| 2002–03 | Daniela Jentsch | Cornelia Stock | Josephine Obermann | Lisa Hammer | Sina Frey | Björn Schröder | EuCC 2002 (7th) |
| 2006–07 | Josephine Obermann | Sina Frey | Karin Fischer | Katja Weisser | | | |
| 2010–11 | Pia-Lisa Schöll | Franzi Fischer | Ann Kathrin Bastian | Josephine Obermann | Anne-Christine Barthel | Martin Beiser | WUG 2011 (8th) |
| 2011–12 | Juliane Jacoby | Franziska Fischer | Josephine Obermann | Martina Fink | Sibylle Maier | | |
| 2012–13 | Juliane Jacoby | Franziska Fischer | Josephine Obermann | Sibylle Maier | | | GWCC 2013 (4th) |
| 2016–17 | Daniela Jentsch | Analena Jentsch | Josephine Obermann | Pia-Lisa Schöll | Marika Trettin | Thomas Lips | ECC 2016 (7th) |
| 2016–17 | Daniela Jentsch | Josephine Obermann | Analena Jentsch | Pia-Lisa Schöll | Emira Abbes | Thomas Lips | WCC 2017 (9th) |
| 2017–18 | Daniela Jentsch | Josephine Obermann | Analena Jentsch | Pia-Lisa Schöll | Emira Abbes | Jock Tyre | ECC 2017 (6th) |
| 2017–18 | Daniela Jentsch | Emira Abbes | Analena Jentsch | Pia-Lisa Schöll | Josephine Obermann | Uli Kapp | WCC 2018 (12th) |

=== Mixed ===
| Season | Skip | Third | Second | Lead | Alternate | Events |
|---|---|---|---|---|---|---|
| 2011–12 | Alexander Baumann | Ann-Kathrin Bastian | Manuel Walter | Katja Weisser | Sebastian Schweizer, Josephine Obermann | EMxCC 2011 (silver) |
