= Almut Hege-Schöll =

German female curler

- Curler ♀

Team
- Curling club: EC Oberstdorf, SC Riessersee; Garmisch-Partenkirchen, Germany

Curling career
- Member Association: Germany
- World Championship: 6 (1981, 1984, 1987, 1988, 1990, 1992)
- European Championship: 5 (1982, 1984, 1985, 1986, 1987)
- Olympic: 1 (1988)
Medal record
Curling
World Championships
Gold medal – first place	1988 Glasgow
Silver medal – second place	1987 Chicago
Bronze medal – third place	1984 Perth
European Championships
Gold medal – first place	1984 Morzine
Gold medal – first place	1986 Kopenhagen
Gold medal – first place	1987 Oberstdorf
German Women's Championship
Gold medal – first place	1990

Almut Hege-Schöll (born 8 June 1958 as Almut Hege) is a former German curler and curling coach.

She is a former World champion (1988) and three-time European champion (1984, 1986, 1987). She competed at the 1988 Winter Olympics when curling was a demonstration sport.

== Awards ==
- Frances Brodie Award: 1990

== Teams ==
Season	Skip	Third	Second	Lead	Alternate	Events
1980–81	Almut Hege	Suzanne Koch	Renate Räderer	Ingeborg Stock		WCC 1981 (9th)
1982–83	Almut Hege	Josefine Einsle	Suzanne Koch	Petra Tschetsch		ECC 1982 (9th); WCC CR 1982 (gold)
1983–84	Almut Hege	Josefine Einsle	Suzanne Koch	Petra Tschetsch		WCC 1984 (bronze)
1984–85	Almut Hege	Josefine Einsle	Suzanne Koch	Petra Tschetsch		ECC 1984 (gold)
1985–86	Almut Hege	Petra Tschetsch	Suzanne Fink	Josefine Einsle		ECC 1985 (6th)
1986–87	Andrea Schöpp	Almut Hege	Monika Wagner	Elinore Schöpp		ECC 1986 (gold); WCC 1987 (silver)
1987–88	Andrea Schöpp	Almut Hege-Schöll	Monika Wagner	Suzanne Fink		ECC 1987 (gold); OG 1988 (demo) (4th); WCC 1988 (gold)
1989–90	Almut Hege-Schöll	Suzanne Fink	Stefan Rossler	Ina Räderer	Josefine Einsle (WCC)	GWCC 1990 (gold); WCC 1990 (5th)
1991–92	Josefine Einsle	Petra Tschetsch-Hiltensberger	Elisabeth Ländle	Karin Fischer	Almut Hege-Schöll	WCC 1992 (8th)

== Record as a coach of national teams ==
Year	Tournament, event	National team	Place
2008	2008 World Junior Curling Championships	Germany (junior women)	10

== Private life ==
Hege-Schöll is from a family of curlers. Her daughter Pia-Lisa Schöll and nephew Sebastian Stock are also top level curlers.

She is married to Franz Schöll.
