= Imogen Oona Lehmann =

Swiss-German curler

- Curler
- Born: 30 December 1989 (age 36)

Team
- Curling club: SC Riessersee; Garmisch-Partenkirchen, Germany
- Skip: Imogen Oona Lehmann
- Third: Corinna Scholz
- Second: Stella Heiß
- Lead: Nicole Muskatewitz

Curling career
- World Championship: 4 (2011, 2012, 2013, 2014)
- European Championship: 4 (2010, 2011, 2012, 2013)
Medal record
Curling
European Mixed
Bronze medal – third place	2010 Howwood

Imogen Oona Lehmann (born 30 December 1989) is a Swiss-German curler. She is a member of the German national women's team. She is originally from Basel, Switzerland.

Oona Lehmann played her junior career in her native Switzerland. In 2009, she placed third at the Swiss junior women's championship. The following year, she was a member of the national junior championship team. She played third for the Swiss junior team at the 2010 World Junior Curling Championships. The team was skipped by Manuela Siegrist. They placed fourth. Later that year, Oona Lehmann moved to Germany.

Oona Lehmann played lead for the German team (skipped by Rainer Schöpp) that won a bronze medal at the 2010 European Mixed Curling Championship. After that, Oona Lehmann joined Schöpp's sister, Andrea's team at the third position.

Since joining the Andrea Schöpp rink, Oona Lehmann has two European Curling Championships (2010 & 2011) and two World Curling Championships (2011 & 2012).
