= Pia-Lisa Schöll =

German curler (born 1991)

- Curler
- Born: Pia-Lisa Schöll; 28 March 1991 (age 35); Oberstdorf, Germany

Team
- Mixed doubles partner: Joshua Sutor

Curling career
- Member Association: Germany
- World Championship: 5 (2015, 2016, 2017, 2018, 2023)
- World Mixed Doubles Championship: 5 (2019, 2021, 2022, 2023, 2025)
- World Mixed Championship: 3 (2015, 2016, 2019)
- European Championship: 5 (2015, 2016, 2017, 2022, 2023)
Medal record
Representing Germany
Curling
World Mixed Doubles Championship
Bronze medal – third place	2022 Geneva
World Mixed Championship
Silver medal – second place	2019 Aberdeen
European Mixed Championship
Gold medal – first place	2013 Edinburgh
European Championship B-Division
Silver medal – second place	2024 Östersund

Pia-Lisa Schöll (born 28 March 1991 in Oberstdorf) is a German curler.

== Career ==
=== Juniors ===
Schöll played third for Germany, skipped by Frederike Templin at the 2008 World Junior Curling Championships, placing last (10th place). She played third for Germany in four European Junior Curling Challenges (2006, 2008, 2009, 2011), winning the event outright in 2008 (qualifying Germany for the 2008 World Juniors). Schöll skipped the German team at the 2011 Winter Universiade, leading her team of Franzi Fischer, Josephine Obermann and Ann-Kathrin Bastian to an 8th-place finish.

=== Women's ===
After her youth career, Schöll found success in mixed curling. She won a gold medal at the 2013 European Mixed Curling Championship, playing lead for Andy Kapp. She also played in the inaugural World Mixed Championship, again playing lead for Kapp's German team. The rink lost in the quarterfinals of the event.

Also in 2015, Schöll joined the Daniela Driendl rink as her lead. They represented Germany at the 2015 World Women's Curling Championship, finishing in 9th place. The team played in the 2015 European Curling Championships where they finished in 7th place. Later in the season, they played in the 2016 Ford World Women's Curling Championship, finishing 10th.

=== Mixed doubles ===
Schöll began playing mixed doubles with teammate Klaudius Harsch. The duo represented Germany at the 2019 World Mixed Doubles Qualification Event, finishing with a perfect 8–0 and qualifying for the 2020 World Mixed Doubles Curling Championship. They would not, however, get the chance to compete at the championship as it was cancelled due to the COVID-19 pandemic. The team would participate in the 2021 World Mixed Doubles Curling Championship, finishing the round robin with a 5–4 record, just missing out on the playoffs. Schöll and Harsch would also participate in the 2021 Olympic Qualification Event, where they finished with a 3–3 record, failing to qualify for the Olympics.

Schöll and Harsch would improve their performance at the 2022 World Mixed Doubles Curling Championship, going 6–3 in the round robin, and winning a bronze medal, beating Norway's Maia Ramsfjell and Magnus Ramsfjell in the bronze medal game. Schöll and Harsch would represent Germany again in the 2023 World Mixed Doubles Curling Championship, but would not be able to repeat their success, finishing round robin play with a disappointing 2–7 record.

Schöll would join forces with Joshua Sutor for the 2023–24 curling season, where the team would not qualify for the World Mixed Doubles Championship, losing the national trial final to Lena Kapp and Sixten Totzek. However, the following season Schöll and Sutor would have the opportunity to represent Germany at the 2025 World Mixed Doubles Curling Championship after winning the national trials, beating Emira Abbes, and Schöll's former teammate Harsch, in the final. At the 2025 worlds, they would again finish round robin play with a 2–7 record, in 14th place.

== Personal life ==
Schöll was employed as a sports soldier and now studies psychology at the University of Mannheim with a top-level sports scholarship from the Rhine-Neckar metropolitan region. Her mother, Almut Hege-Schöll won the world championships in 1988.
