= Corinna Scholz =

German curler

- Curler
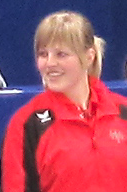
- Born: 1 August 1989 (age 37); Schongau, Bavaria, West Germany

Team
- Curling club: CC Füssen; Füssen, Germany
- Skip: Imogen Oona Lehmann
- Third: Corinna Scholz
- Second: Stella Heiß
- Lead: Nicole Muskatewitz

Curling career
- World Championship: 5 (2010, 2011, 2012, 2013, 2014)
- European Championship: 5 (2009, 2010, 2011, 2012, 2013)
- Olympic: 1 (2010)
Medal record
Curling
Representing Germany
World Championships
Gold medal – first place	2010 Swift Current
European Championships
Gold medal – first place	2009 Aberdeen
European Junior Challenge
Gold medal – first place	2010 Prague

Corinna Scholz (born 1 August 1989 in Schongau, Bavaria) is a German curler from Bernbeuren. She competed as the alternate for Germany at the 2010 Winter Olympics. At the 2009 Aberdeen European Championships she also served as the Alternate, but was asked to play Lead in several matches.

== Teammates ==
2009 Aberdeen European Championships
2010 Vancouver Olympic Games
2010 Ford World Women's Curling Championship

- Andrea Schöpp, Skip
- Monika Wagner, Third
- Melanie Robillard, Second
- Stella Heiß, Lead
