= Heike Schwaller =

German-Swiss curler

- Curler
- Born: Heike Wieländer; 24 July 1968 (age 58)

Curling career
- World Championship: 9 (1991, 1995-1999, 2001, 2002, 2010)
- European Championship: 10 (1989, 1990, 1994-2001)
- Olympic: 2 (1998, 2002)
Medal record
Women's curling
Representing Germany
European Championships
Gold medal – first place	1989 Engelberg
Gold medal – first place	1995 Grindelwald
Gold medal – first place	1998 Flims
Silver medal – second place	1994 Sundsvall
Bronze medal – third place	1996 Copenhagen
Bronze medal – third place	1997 Füssen

Heike Schwaller (née Wieländer, born 24 July 1968) is a German-Swiss curler.

== Curling career ==
Schwaller has played most of her competitive career for Germany. As a junior curler she competed at the European Junior Championships in 1985 and World Junior Championships in 1989; her team finished 7th at both tournaments.

At the 1989 and 1990 European Curling Championships she played lead for skip Andrea Schöpp, and won a gold medal at the 1989 event. Schwaller moved to second for Team Schöpp for her first World Championship in 1991, where the team finished 5th.

After a few years away from Team Schöpp, Schwaller returned as alternate for the team from 1994 through 1997. As alternate, the team won a silver medal at the 1994 European Curling Championships, gold at the 1995 European Curling Championships, and a bronze at the 1996 European Curling Championships and 1997 European Curling Championships. The team also represented Germany at 3 World Championships in 1995, 1996, and 1997, with a best finish of fourth. Schwaller, however, never played a game in any of these tournaments.

Schwaller returned to lead on Team Schöpp for the 1998 Winter Olympics in Nagano, Japan. Schwaller's Team Germany finished the Games in last place, with only one win. She was promoted back to second following the Olympics and played another four European Championships (1998-2001) and three World Championships (1998, 1999, and 2001) in this position on Team Schöpp. At the 1998 European Championships Schwaller won another gold medal; finishing 5th, 4th, and 4th the following three years. The team finished 5th at all three of these World Championship appearances.

Schwaller again represented Germany for the 2002 Winter Olympics in Salt Lake City. The team lineup was very similar to that of Team Schöpp that competed at the 2001 European Championships only a couple months earlier, including Schwaller, Andrea Stock, and Natalie Nessler, but missing Andrea Schöpp. Due to a disagreement with the German Curling Association, Schöpp was replaced at skip with Natalie Nessler, her long-time third. Sabine Belkofer was brought in to take Nessler's vacated spot at third. Team Germany greatly improved their performance compared to the 1998 Games, finishing 5th with a record of 5-5, missing the playoffs by one spot.

Team Germany maintained the same line-up later that year for the 2002 World Championships. They finished 9th out of 10 teams. This was Schwaller's final competition representing Germany.

Schwaller reappeared on the international curling stage at the 2010 World Championships, this time representing her new country of Switzerland. She played second for Binia Feltscher.

== Personal life ==
Schwaller is married to Andreas Schwaller, a Swiss curler who won a bronze medal at the 2002 Winter Olympics. Her daughters are Xenia Schwaller and Zoe Schwaller. Schwaller's brother-in-law, Christof, is also an elite curler and played third for his brother Andreas at the 2002 Olympics.
