= Andrea Schöpp =

German curler and Olympic gold medalist

- Curler
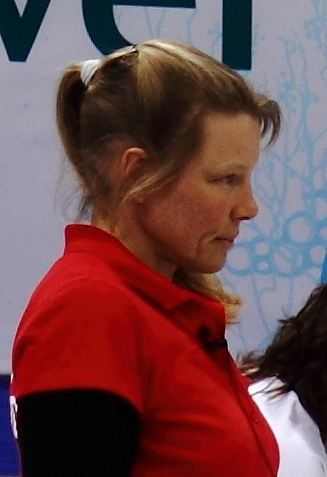
- Born: 27 February 1965 (age 61); Garmisch-Partenkirchen, West Germany

Team
- Curling club: SC Riessersee; Garmisch-Partenkirchen, Germany
- Skip: Andrea Schöpp
- Third: Monika Wagner
- Second: Andrea Crawford
- Lead: Lisa Ruch
- Alternate: Kerstin Ruch

Curling career
- Member Association: Germany
- World Championship: 19 (1985, 1986, 1987, 1988, 1989, 1991, 1995, 1996, 1997, 1998, 1999, 2001, 2006, 2007, 2008, 2009, 2010, 2011, 2013)
- World Mixed Doubles Championship: 1 (2016)
- European Championship: 28 (1980, 1981, 1983, 1986, 1987, 1989, 1990, 1991, 1992, 1994, 1995, 1996, 1997, 1998, 1999, 2000, 2001, 2003, 2005, 2006, 2007, 2008, 2009, 2010, 2011, 2012, 2013, 2014)
- Olympic: 2 (1998, 2010)
Medal record
Women's curling
Representing Germany
Olympic Games
Gold medal – first place	1992 Albertville (demonstration)
World Championships
Gold medal – first place	1988 Glasgow
Gold medal – first place	2010 Swift Current
Silver medal – second place	1986 Kelowna
Silver medal – second place	1987 Chicago
Bronze medal – third place	1989 Milwaukee
World Senior Championships
Silver medal – second place	2016 Karlstad
European Championships
Gold medal – first place	1986 Køpenhavn
Gold medal – first place	1987 Oberstdorf
Gold medal – first place	1989 Engelberg
Gold medal – first place	1991 Chamonix
Gold medal – first place	1995 Grindelwald
Gold medal – first place	1998 Flims
Gold medal – first place	2009 Aberdeen
Silver medal – second place	1994 Sundsvall
Bronze medal – third place	1980 Køpenhavn
Bronze medal – third place	1992 Perth
Bronze medal – third place	1996 Køpenhavn
Bronze medal – third place	1997 Füssen
European Mixed
Gold medal – first place	2008 Kitzbühel
Bronze medal – third place	2005 Andorra
Bronze medal – third place	2007 Madrid
Bronze medal – third place	2010 Howwood

Andrea Schöpp (born 27 February 1965) is a German curler from Garmisch-Partenkirchen. She lectures part-time in statistics at LMU Munich.

== Career ==
Schöpp is a two-time World champion (1988 and 2010), seven-time European champion (1986, 1987, 1989, 1991, 1995, 1998, 2009) and 1992 Winter Olympics champion (demonstration). Schöpp has skipped every team she has played for in international events - except when she plays at the European Mixed Curling Championships, where she usually plays third for her brother, Rainer.

Schöpp made her international debut in 1980, at the age of 15. She skipped the German team to a bronze medal at the European championships that year. She also won silver medals at the Worlds in 1986 and 1987 and a bronze in 1989. She continues to curl, although she has had less success in the last decade. Her fourth-place finish at the 2006 Ford World Women's Curling Championship was her highest placement since 1996 at the Worlds. She won the 2010 World Curling Championship in Swift Current, Saskatchewan, Canada with an extra-end victory over Scotland's Eve Muirhead.

Schöpp won a gold medal at the 2008 European Mixed Curling Championship as a part of the team skipped by her brother Rainer.

== Personal life ==
Schöpp studied statistics at LMU Munich and obtained her diploma in 1991. She completed her doctorate in 1996, and has been employed at LMU Munich from 1991.

Schöpp's brother, Rainer Schöpp, is also a curler.

She was born hours before her longtime teammate, Monika Wagner, in the same hospital.

== Teammates ==
Season	Skip	Third	Second	Lead
1980–81	Andrea Schöpp	Elinore Schöpp	Anneliese Diemer	Monika Wagner
1981–82	Andrea Schöpp	Monica Wackerle	Monika Wagner	Marga Hupertz
1983–84	Andrea Schöpp	Monika Wagner	Anneliese Diemer	Elinore Schöpp
1984–85	Andrea Schöpp	Monika Wagner	Christiane Jentsch	Elinore Schöpp
1985–86	Andrea Schöpp	Monika Wagner	Stephanie Mayr	Birgit Hupertz (Jrs); Elinore Schöpp (Worlds)
1986–87	Andrea Schöpp	Almut Hege	Monika Wagner	Elinore Schöpp
1987–88	Andrea Schöpp	Almut Hege-Schöll	Monika Wagner	Suzanne Fink
1988–89	Andrea Schöpp	Monika Wagner	Barbara Haller	Christina Haller
1989–90	Andrea Schöpp	Monika Wagner	Christina Haller	Heike Schwaller
1990–91	Andrea Schöpp	Monika Wagner	Christina Haller	Heike Schwaller
1991–92	Andrea Schöpp	Stephanie Mayr	Monika Wagner	Sabine Huth
1992–93	Andrea Schöpp	Monika Wagner	Stephanie Mayr	Christiane Scheibel
1994–95	Andrea Schöpp	Monika Wagner	Natalie Nessler	Christina Haller (ECC); Carina Meidele (WCC)
1995–96	Andrea Schöpp	Monika Wagner	Natalie Nessler	Carina Meidele
1996–97	Andrea Schöpp	Monika Wagner	Natalie Nessler	Carina Meidele
1997–98	Andrea Schöpp	Monika Wagner	Natalie Nessler	Carina Meidele (ECC); Heike Schwaller (OG)
1998 WCC	Andrea Schöpp	Natalie Nessler	Heike Schwaller	Jane Boake-Cope
1998–99	Andrea Schöpp	Natalie Nessler	Heike Schwaller	Jane Boake-Cope
1999–00	Andrea Schöpp	Natalie Nessler	Heike Schwaller	Andrea Stock
2000–01	Andrea Schöpp	Natalie Nessler	Heike Schwaller	Andrea Stock (ECC); Jane Boake-Cope (WCC)
2001–02	Andrea Schöpp	Natalie Nessler	Heike Schwaller	Andrea Stock
2003–04	Andrea Schöpp	Monika Wagner	Jane Boake-Cope	Anna Hartelt
2005–06	Andrea Schöpp	Monika Wagner	Anna Hartelt	Marie-Therese Rotter
2006–07	Andrea Schöpp	Monika Wagner	Anna Hartelt	Marie-Therese Rotter
2007–08	Andrea Schöpp	Monika Wagner	Anna Hartelt	Marie-Therese Rotter
2008–09	Andrea Schöpp	Monika Wagner	Melanie Robillard	Stella Heiß
2009–10	Andrea Schöpp	Melanie Robillard	Monika Wagner	Corinna Scholz (ECC, WCC); Stella Heiß (OG)
2010–11	Andrea Schöpp	Monika Wagner	Corinna Scholz	Stella Heiß
2011–12	Andrea Schöpp	Imogen Oona Lehmann	Corinna Scholz	Stella Heiß
2014–15	Andrea Schöpp	Monika Wagner	Lisa Ruch	Kerstin Ruch

== Works ==
- Alternative Parametrisierungen Bei Korrelierten Bivariaten Binären Responsevariablen. Vol. 1, Anwendungsorientierte Statistik. 1997. ISBN 978-3-631-30775-5 (in German)
