= Stella Heiß =

German curler

- Curler
- Born: 15 January 1993 (age 33); Cologne, Germany

Team
- Curling club: SC Riessersee; Garmisch-Partenkirchen, Germany

Curling career
- Member Association: Germany
- World Championship: 7 (2009, 2010, 2011, 2012, 2013, 2014, 2015)
- European Championship: 6 (2008, 2009, 2010, 2011, 2012, 2013)
- Olympic: 1 (2010)
Medal record
Women's curling
Representing Germany
World Championships
| Gold medal – first place | 2010 Swift Current |
European Championships
| Gold medal – first place | 2009 Aberdeen |

Stella Heiß (born 15 January 1993 in Cologne) is a German curler from Garmisch-Partenkirchen. She played lead for Andrea Schöpp when she represented Germany at the 2010 Winter Olympics in Curling. At seventeen years, she was the youngest curler at the Games.

She is the daughter of former German ice hockey goaltender Josef Heiß.

== Teammates ==
2009 Aberdeen European Championships
2010 Vancouver Olympic Games
2010 Ford World Women's Curling Championship

Andrea Schöpp, Skip

Monika Wagner, Third

Melanie Robillard, Second

Corinna Scholz, Alternate
