= Monika Wagner =

German curler

- Curler ♀
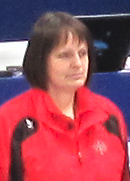

Team
- Curling club: SC Riessersee
- Skip: Andrea Schöpp
- Third: Monika Wagner
- Second: Andrea Crawford
- Lead: Lisa Ruch
- Alternate: Kerstin Ruch

Curling career
- World Championship: 16 (1985, 1986, 1987, 1988, 1989, 1991, 1995, 1996, 1997, 2006, 2007, 2008, 2009, 2010, 2011, 2012)
- European Championship: 21 (1980, 1981, 1983, 1986, 1987, 1989, 1990, 1991, 1992, 1994, 1995, 1996, 1997, 2003, 2005, 2006, 2007, 2008, 2009, 2010, 2011)
Medal record
Women's curling
Representing Germany
Olympic Games
Gold medal – first place	1992 Albertville (demonstration)
World Championships
Gold medal – first place	1988 Glasgow
Gold medal – first place	2010 Swift Current
Silver medal – second place	1986 Kelowna
Silver medal – second place	1987 Chicago
Bronze medal – third place	1989 Milwaukee
World Senior Championships
Silver medal – second place	2016 Karlstad
European Championships
Gold medal – first place	1986 Køpenhavn
Gold medal – first place	1987 Oberstdorf
Gold medal – first place	1989 Engelberg
Gold medal – first place	1991 Chamonix
Gold medal – first place	1995 Grindelwald
Gold medal – first place	2009 Aberdeen
Silver medal – second place	1994 Sundsvall
Bronze medal – third place	1980 Køpenhavn
Bronze medal – third place	1992 Perth
Bronze medal – third place	1996 Køpenhavn
Bronze medal – third place	1997 Füssen
European Mixed
Gold medal – first place	2008 Kitzbühel
Bronze medal – third place	2005 Andorra

Monika Wagner (born 28 February 1965 in Garmisch-Partenkirchen, West Germany) is a German curler. She currently plays third for Andrea Schöpp, who was born eight hours before her in the same hospital.

Wagner has played with Schöpp for most of her international career. She was her lead at the 1980 European Curling Championships where they won the bronze medal. Since then Wagner has been both Schöpp's second and third. With Schöpp, Wagner has won the World Curling Championships in 1988 and 2010, six European Curling Championships (1986, 1987, 1989, 1991, 1995 and 2009) and an Olympic Gold medal (1992).

She was an alternate on the German team that won the 2008 European Mixed Curling Championship.

She was a member of the German team at the 1998 and 2010 Winter Olympics.
