= Rainer Schöpp =

German curler and coach

- Curler

Curling career
- World Championship: 1 (1988)
- World Mixed Doubles Championship: 1 (2016)
Medal record
Curling
Representing Germany
European Mixed Championship
Gold medal – first place	2008 Kitzbühel
Bronze medal – third place	2005 Canillo
Bronze medal – third place	2007 Madrid
Bronze medal – third place	2010 Howwood

Rainer Schöpp is a German curler and curling coach. He is a former European mixed curling champion.

== Career ==
Schöpp represented Germany in his junior years at the World Junior Curling Championships, with his best finish at the event in 1978 in sixth place. He represented Germany at his first and only world championship in 1988, finishing in sixth place with a 3–6 win–loss record.

Schöpp has been most successful in representing Germany at the European Mixed Curling Championship. He won the title in 2008, and posted three bronze-medal finishes in 2005, 2007, and 2010.

Schöpp has also represented Germany at the World Senior Curling Championships. He finished in eleventh place in 2012, and will skip the German team in 2014.
