= Scottish Women's Curling Championship =

Curling championship in Scotland

- Established: 1962
- 2026 host city: Dumfries
- 2026 arena: Dumfries Ice Bowl
- 2026 champion: Fay Henderson

The Scottish Women's Curling Championship is the national women's curling championship for Scotland. The championship usually decides which team of curlers is sent to the World Women's Curling Championship, but in Olympic years, the winner must play the British Olympic representative to play to determine the Scottish team at the Worlds. Beginning in 2021, Scotland's World Championship teams will be selected by Scottish Curling instead. In 2026, the championship will determine which team is sent to the European Curling Championships, with the exceptions of in the Olympic year, where the current Olympic representatives will have a playoff against the Scottish Champions, and in the year preceding the Olympics, where the Olympic representative will be selected for the Europeans as preparation for the Olympics.

== Past champions ==
Year	Skip	Third	Second	Lead	Locale
1977	Bett Law	Bea Dodds	Margaret Paterson	Margaret Cadzow	Perth
1978	Isobel Torrance	Isobel Waddell	Marion Armour	Margaret Wiseman	Hamilton
1979	Beth Lindsay	Anne MacKellar	Jeanette Johnston	May Taylor	Ayr
1980	Bett Law	Bea Sinclair	Jane Sanderson	Carol Hamilton	Perth
1981	Helen Caird	Rae Gray	Sheena Hay	Helen Watson	Dundee
1982	Isobel Torrance	Isobel Waddell	Marion Armour	Margaret Wiseman	Hamilton
1983	Hazel McGregor	Jane Ramsay	Betty McGregor	Billie-May Muirhead	Perth
1984	Sadie Anderson	Annie Kennedy	Martha McFadzean	Jessie Brown	Ayr
1985	Isobel Torrance, Jr.	Margaret Craig	Jackie Steele	Sheila Harvey	Hamilton
1986	Isobel Torrance, Jr.	Margaret Craig	Jackie Steele	Sheila Harvey	Hamilton
1987	Marion Miller	Janice Miller	Jane McConnell	Moira McConnell	Howwood
1988	Christine Allison	Margaret Scott	Kimmie Brown	Sheena Drummie	Hamilton
1989	Christine Allison	Margaret Scott	Kimmie Brown	Carol Dawson	Hamilton
1990	Carolyn Hutchison	Claire Milne	Mairi Milne	Tara Brown	Howwood
1991	Christine Allison	Claire Milne	Mairi Milne	Margaret Richardson	Hamilton
1992	Jackie Lockhart	Debbie Knox	Wendy Bell	Judith Stobbie	Aberdeen
1993	Christine Cannon	Claire Milne	Mairi Herd	Margaret Richardson	Stranraer
1994	Christine Cannon	Claire Milne	Mairi Milne	Janice Watt	Stranraer
1995	Kirsty Hay	Edith Loudon	Joanna Pegg	Katie Loudon	Perth
1996	Kirsty Hay	Edith Loudon	Karen Addison	Katie Loudon	Perth
1997	Carolyn Hutchison	Heather Corckett	Jan Byers	Lucy Levack	Lockerbie
1998	Kirsty Hay	Edith Loudon	Jackie Lockhart	Katie Loudon; Alternate: Fiona Bayne	Perth
1999	Debbie Knox	Isobel Hannen	Wendy Bell	Judith Stobie	Howwood
2000	Rhona Martin	Margaret Morton	Fiona MacDonald	Janice Watt	Howwood
2001	Julia Ewart	Heather Byers	Nancy Murdoch	Lynn Cameron	Dundee
2002	Jackie Lockhart	Sheila Swan	Katriona Fairweather	Anne Laird	Aberdeen
2003	Edith Loudon	Karen Addison	Lynn Cameron	Katie Loudon	Perth
2004	Jackie Lockhart	Sheila Swan	Katriona Fairweather	Anne Laird	Aberdeen
2005	Kelly Wood	Lorna Vevers	Sheila Swan	Lindsay Wood	Stirling
2006	Kelly Wood	Lorna Vevers	Kim Brewster	Lindsay Wood	Stirling
2007	Kelly Wood	Jackie Lockhart	Lorna Vevers	Lindsay Wood	Stirling
2008	Gail Munro	Lyndsay Wilson	Karen Addison	Anne Laird	Stranraer
2009	Eve Muirhead	Karen Addison	Rachael Simms	Anne Laird	Perth
2010	Eve Muirhead	Kelly Wood	Lorna Vevers	Anne Laird; Alternate: Jackie Lockhart	Perth
2011	Anna Sloan	Claire Hamilton	Vicki Adams	Rhiann Macleod	Lockerbie
2012	Eve Muirhead	Anna Sloan	Vicki Adams	Claire Hamilton	Perth
2013	Eve Muirhead	Anna Sloan	Vicki Adams	Claire Hamilton	Perth
2014	Kerry Barr	Rachael Simms	Rhiann Macleod	Barbara McPake	Murrayfield
2015	Eve Muirhead	Anna Sloan	Vicki Adams	Sarah Reid	Perth
2016	Eve Muirhead	Anna Sloan	Vicki Adams	Sarah Reid	Perth
2017	Eve Muirhead	Anna Sloan	Vicki Adams	Lauren Gray	Perth
2018	Hannah Fleming	Jennifer Dodds	Alice Spence	Vicky Wright	Lockerbie
2019	Sophie Jackson	Naomi Brown	Mili Smith	Sophie Sinclair	Dumfries
2020	Eve Muirhead	Lauren Gray	Jennifer Dodds	Vicky Wright	Perth
2021	Cancelled due to the COVID-19 pandemic in Scotland				
2022	Rebecca Morrison	Gina Aitken	Sophie Sinclair	Sophie Jackson	Aberdeen
2023	Rebecca Morrison	Gina Aitken	Sophie Sinclair	Sophie Jackson	Aberdeen
2024	Fay Henderson	Hailey Duff	Amy MacDonald	Katie McMillan	Dumfries
2025	Fay Henderson	Robyn Munro	Hailey Duff	Katie McMillan	Dumfries
2026	Fay Henderson	Lisa Davie	Hailey Duff	Katie McMillan	Dumfries

== See also ==
- Scottish Men's Curling Championship
- Scottish Mixed Curling Championship
- Scottish Mixed Doubles Curling Championship
- Scottish Junior Curling Championships
- Scottish Senior Curling Championships
- Scottish Schools Curling Championship
- Scottish Wheelchair Curling Championship
