= Scottish Junior Curling Championships =

The Scottish Junior Curling Championships takes place every year with eight men's and women's teams playing off to try to win the title and represent Scotland at the World Junior Curling Championships. The host city is Aberdeen, where the curling takes place at Curl Aberdeen. The Scottish Junior Curling Championships dates back to 1975. However, the Annual of the RCCC for 1971-72 includes a photograph of Winners of the Scottish Junior Championship at Aberdeen: J. Miller (lead), D. Halkerston (2nd), P. Drysdale (3rd), John McLaren (skip), being presented with trophy.

== Past champions ==
Past Champions of the Scottish Junior Curling Championships
Year	Men's champions	Women's champions
1975	Peter J.D. Wilson (Stranraer), Andrew McQuistin, Neale McQuistin, John Sharp	
1976	Robert Kelly (Glasgow), Ken Horton, Willie Jamieson, Keith Douglas	
1977	Lockhart Steele (Hamilton), Gavin Wiseman, Tom McGregor, Archie Craig	
1978	Colin Hamilton (Edinburgh), Douglas Edwardson, Trevor Dodds, David Ramsay	
1979	Andrew McQuistin (Stranraer), Neale McQuistin, Hugh Aitken, Richard Adams	
1980	Andrew McQuistin (Stranraer), Norman Brown, Hugh Aitken, Richard Adams	
1981	Peter Wilson (Stranraer), Jim Cannon, Roger McIntyre, John Parker	Alison Aitken (Stranraer), Fiona McMillan, Christine Sharp, Rona Grierson
1982	Robin Gray (Greenacres), Mark Stokes, Drew Howie, David Mack	Lorna Muirhead (Kinross), Jane McLaren, Lorna Bain, Beth Cook
1983	Mike Hay (Perth), David Hay, David Smith, Russell Keiller	Isobel Torrance Jr. (Hamilton), Margaret Craig, Jackie Steele, Sheila Harvey
1984	Mike Hay (Perth), Gregor Smith, David Smith, Russell Keiller	Susan McLean (Gogar Park), Katie Wood, Fran Harvey, Shona Wood
1985	Hammy McMillan (Perth), David Smith, Peter Smith, Peter Thomson	Lorna Muirhead (Kinross), Lorna Bain, Liz Bayne, Yvonne Dawson
1986	David Aitken (Gogar Park), Robin Halliday, Peter Smith, Harry Reilly	Lorna Muirhead (Kinross), Lorna Bain, Liz Bayne, Yvonne Dawson
1987	Douglas Dryburgh (Kirkcaldy), Philip Wilson, Lindsay Clark, Billy Andrew	Wendy Howden (Kirkcaldy), Susan Tarvet, Deborah Knox, Julie Stevenson
1988	Alistair Scott (Perth), Peter Loudon, Derek Brown, Douglas Taylor	Carolyn Hutchison (Greenacres), Rhona Howie, Joan Robertson, Tara Brown
1989	Allan Manuel (Perth/Gogar Park), Colin Galbraith, Andrew Finlay, Adrian Coutts	Carolyn Hutchison (Greenacres), Julie Hepburn, Katie Loudon, Julia Halliday
1990	Graeme Connal (Perth), Iain Watt, Simon Hartley, Ian Baxter	Kirsty Addison (Greenacres), Karen Addison, Joanna Pegg, Laura Scott
1991	Alan MacDougall (Greenacres), James Dryburgh, Fraser McGregor, Colin Beckett	Gillian Barr (Gogar Park), Claire Milne, Janice Watt, Anne Laird
1992	Allan Lyburn (Stranraer), William Lyburn, Colin Beckett, Fraser Hare	Gillian Barr (Gogar Park), Claire Milne, Janice Watt, Nikki Mauchline
1993	Craig Wilson (Lockerbie), Neil Murdoch, Ricky Burnett, Craig Strawhorn	Kirsty Hay (Perth), Fiona Brown, Joanna Pegg, Louise Wilkie
1994	Craig Wilson (Lockerbie), Neil Murdoch, Ricky Burnett, Craig Strawhorn	Gillian Howard (Greenacres), Kirsty Hynd, Alison Kinghorn, Sandra Hynd
1995	Tom Brewster (Lockerbie), Paul Westwood, Ronald Brewster, Steve Still	Julia Ewart (Forfar), Catherine Grainger, Mhairi Ferguson, Lucy Levack
1996	James Dryburgh (Aviemore), Ross Barnet, Ronald Brewster, David Murdoch	Julia Ewart (Forfar), Catherine Grainger, Mhairi Ferguson, Lucy Levack
1997	Ricky Tasker (Forfar), Gary Wood, Jamie Kirk, Sandy Reid	Julia Ewart (Perth), Michelle Silvera, Mhairi Ferguson, Lynn Cameron
1998	Garry MacKay (Gogar Park), David Murdoch, Sandy Reid, Richard Woods	Julia Ewart (Perth), Michelle Silvera, Kirsty Drummond, Lynn Cameron
1999	David Murdoch (Lockerbie), Duncan Fernie, Andrew Reid, Richard Woods	Kelly Wood (Perth), Lorna Vevers, Janie Johnston, Lindsay Wood
2000	Duncan Fernie (Atholl), Richard Woods, Jamie Kirk, Andrew Reid	Louise Tasker (Forfar), Claire Robertson, Janie Johnston, Karen Soutar
2001	David Edwards (Lockerbie), Callum Allison, Kenneth Edwards, Graham Sloan	Kelly Wood (Letham Grange), Lorna Vevers, Jacqui Reid, Lindsay Wood
2002	Kenneth Edwards (Lockerbie), Duncan Clark, Graeme Baxter, Philip Garden	Kelly Wood (Letham Grange), Lorna Vevers, Jacqui Reid, Lindsay Wood
2003	Keith MacLennan (Atholl), Bryan Greenock, David Robertson, David Soutar	Rachael Simms (Lockerbie), Victoria Sloan, Lynsey Davidson, Laura Kirkpatrick
2004	Scott Hamilton (Lockerbie), Graham Smith, Gareth Owen, David Morton	Sarah Reid (Galleon), Judith McFarlane, Frances McKerrow, Nicola Munro
2005	Logan Gray (Forest Hills), Ross Paterson, Sandy Gilmour, Graeme Copland	Victoria Sloan (Lockerbie), Kerry Barr, Clare Wyllie, Laura Kirkpatrick
2006	Logan Gray (Forest Hills), Alasdair Guthrie, Keith Duncan Miller, Gordon McDougall	Jennifer Morrison (Lockerbie), Alison Black, Katie Stevenson, Rachel Speedie
2007	Logan Gray (Stirling), Alasdair Guthrie, Glen Muirhead, Gordon McDougall	Sarah Reid (Galleon), Eve Muirhead, Barbara McFarlane, Sarah Macintyre
2008	Glen Muirhead (Atholl), Scott Macleod, Scott Andrews, Gordon McDougall	Eve Muirhead (Atholl), Kerry Barr, Vicki Adams, Sarah Macintyre
2009	Graeme Black (Lockerbie), Ally Fraser, Steven Mitchell, Thomas Sloan	Eve Muirhead (Atholl), Anna Sloan, Vicki Adams, Sarah Macintyre
2010	Ally Fraser (Inverness), Steven Mitchell, Scott Andrews, Kerr Drummond	Lauren Gray (Lockerbie), Claire MacDonald, Tasha Aitken, Caitlin Barr
2011	John Penny (Aberdeen), Colin Dick, Colin Howden, Billy Morton	Eve Muirhead (Perth), Anna Sloan, Vicki Adams, Rhiann Macleod
2012	Kyle Smith (Perth), Thomas Muirhead, Kyle Waddell, Kerr Drummond	Hannah Fleming (Lockerbie), Lauren Gray, Alice Spence, Abigail Brown
2013	Kyle Smith (Perth), Thomas Muirhead, Kyle Waddell, Cameron Smith	Hannah Fleming (Lockerbie), Lauren Gray, Jennifer Dodds, Abigail Brown
2014	Kyle Smith (Perth), Thomas Muirhead, Kyle Waddell, Cameron Smith	Gina Aitken (Murrayfield), Naomi Brown, Rowena Kerr, Rachel Hannen
2015	Bruce Mouat (Murrayfield), Duncan Menzies, Derrick Sloan, Angus Dowell	Gina Aitken (Murrayfield), Naomi Brown, Rowena Kerr, Rachel Hannen
2016	Bruce Mouat (Murrayfield), Bobby Lammie, Gregor Cannon, Angus Dowell	Sophie Jackson (Dumfries), Naomi Brown, Rachael Halliday, Rachel Hannen
2017	Cameron Bryce (Border), Robin Brydone, Euan Kyle, Frazer Shaw	Sophie Jackson (Dumfries), Naomi Brown, Mili Smith, Sophie Sinclair
2018	Ross Whyte (Dumfries), Robin Brydone, Fraser Kingan, Euan Kyle	Rebecca Morrison (Aberdeen), Amy MacDonald, Hailey Duff, Leeanne McKenzie
2019	Ross Whyte (Dumfries), Duncan McFadzean, James Craik, Euan Kyle	Lisa Davie (Stirling), Kirsty Barr, Anna Skuse, Emma Barr
2020	James Craik (Forfar), Mark Watt, Blair Haswell, Niall Ryder	Amy Bryce (Kelso), Robyn Munro, Inca Maguire, Laura Watt
2021	James Craik (Forfar), Angus Bryce, Scott Hyslop, Niall Ryder, Jack Carrick	Fay Henderson (Dumfries), Katie McMillan, Lisa Davie, Holly Wilkie-Milne
2022	Orrin Carson (Dumfries), Logan Carson, Archie Hyslop, Charlie Gibb	Fay Henderson (Dumfries), Robyn Munro, Holly Wilkie-Milne, Laura Watt
2023	Orrin Carson (Dumfries), Logan Carson, Archie Hyslop, Charlie Gibb	Robyn Munro (Stranraer), Amy Mitchell, Holly Wilkie-Milne, Laura Watt
2024	Orrin Carson (Dumfries), Logan Carson, Archie Hyslop, Charlie Gibb	Callie Soutar (Forfar), Eva Hare, Holly Clemy, Alison Hamilton
2025	Orrin Carson (Dumfries), Logan Carson, Archie Hyslop, Charlie Gibb	Katie Archibald (curler) (Aberdeen), Alex McMillan, Hannah Young, Lilia Clarke

== See also ==
- Scottish Men's Curling Championship
- Scottish Women's Curling Championship
- Scottish Mixed Curling Championship
- Scottish Mixed Doubles Curling Championship
- Scottish Senior Curling Championships
- Scottish Schools Curling Championship
- Scottish Wheelchair Curling Championship
