= Isobel Hannen =

Scottish female curler

- Curler ♀
- Born: Isobel Torrance Jr. 17 December 1962 (age 63)

Team
- Curling club: Hamilton & Thornyhill CC, Hamilton, Greenacres CC, Renfrewshire

Curling career
- Member Association: Scotland
- World Championship: 4 (1985, 1986, 1992, 1999)
- European Championship: 1 (1983)
- Olympic: 1 (1992 – demo)
- Other appearances: European Junior Championships: 1 (1983), World Senior Championships: 3 (2014, 2016, 2017)
Medal record
Curling
World Championships
| Silver medal – second place | 1985 Jönköping |
Scottish Women's Championship
| Gold medal – first place | 1985 |
| Gold medal – first place | 1986 |
| Gold medal – first place | 1999 |
World Senior Championships
| Gold medal – first place | 2014 Dumfries |
| Gold medal – first place | 2016 Karlstad |
| Bronze medal – third place | 2017 Lethbridge |

Isobel L. Hannen (born 17 December 1962 as Isobel Torrance Jr.) is a Scottish curler and curling coach.

She is a 1985 World silver medallist.

She competed at the 1992 Winter Olympics when curling was a demonstration sport.

== Personal life ==
Her mother Isobel Torrance is a former competitive curler, 1982 World bronze medallist and two-time Scottish women's champion. Hannen's daughter Rachel is also a competitive curler.

== Teams ==
| Season | Skip | Third | Second | Lead | Alternate | Coach | Events |
|---|---|---|---|---|---|---|---|
| 1982–83 | Isobel Torrance Jr. | Margaret Craig | Jackie Steele | Sheila Harvey | | | SJCC 1983 (gold); EJCC 1983 (silver) |
| 1983–84 | Isobel Torrance Jr. | Margaret Craig | Jackie Steele | Sheila Harvey | | | ECC 1983 (4th) |
| 1984–85 | Isobel Torrance Jr. | Margaret Craig | Jackie Steele | Sheila Harvey | | | SWCC 1985 (gold); WCC 1985 (silver) |
| 1985–86 | Isobel Torrance Jr. | Margaret Craig | Jackie Steele | Sheila Harvey | | | SWCC 1986 (gold); WCC 1986 (4th) |
| 1991–92 | Jackie Lockhart | Deborah Knox | Judith Stobbie | Wendy Bell | Isobel Torrance Jr. | Peter Loudon | WOG 1992 (demo) (6th) |
| 1991–92 | Jackie Lockhart | Deborah Knox | Wendy Bell | Judith Stobbie | Isobel Torrance Jr. | Peter Loudon | WCC 1992 (5th) |
| 1998–99 | Deborah Knox | Isobel Hannen | Wendy Bell | Judith Stobbie | Anne Laird (WCC) | Alex F. Torrance | SWCC 1999 (gold); WCC 1999 (10th) |
| 2013–14 | Christine Cannon | Margaret Richardson | Isobel Hannen | Janet Lindsay | Margaret Robertson | Jackie Lockhart | WSCC 2014 (gold) |
| 2015–16 | Jackie Lockhart | Christine Cannon | Isobel Hannen | Margaret Richardson | Margaret Robertson | | WSCC 2016 (gold) |
| 2016–17 | Jackie Lockhart | Christine Cannon | Isobel Hannen | Margaret Richardson | Janet Lindsay | | WSCC 2017 (bronze) |

== Record as a coach of national teams ==
| Year | Tournament, event | National team | Place |
|---|---|---|---|
| 2002 | 2002 European Curling Championships | Scotland (women) | 6 |
| 2003 | 2003 European Curling Championships | Scotland (women) | 4 |
| 2004 | 2004 World Women's Curling Championship | Scotland (women) | 5 |
| 2008 | 2008 World Junior Curling Championships | Scotland (junior women) | 1st place, gold medalist(s) |
| 2009 | 2009 World Junior Curling Championships | Scotland (junior women) | 1st place, gold medalist(s) |
| 2009 | 2009 World Women's Curling Championship | Scotland (women) | 8 |
| 2011 | 2011 World Women's Curling Championship | Scotland (women) | 9 |
| 2013 | 2013 World Senior Curling Championships | Scotland (senior women) | 4 |
