= Claire Milne =

Scottish curler and coach

- Curler ♀

Team
- Curling club: Greenacres CC, Renfrewshire; East Kilbride & Haremyres CC, Lanarkshire, Wigtown CC, Stranraer, Letham Grange Ice Rink

Curling career
- Member Association: Scotland
- World Championship: 7 (1990, 1991, 1993, 1994, 1995, 1996, 2005)
- European Championship: 4 (1995, 1998, 2004, 2006)
- Other appearances: World Junior Championship: 2 (1991, 1992)
Medal record
Curling
World Championships
Silver medal – second place	1990 Västerås
Silver medal – second place	1994 Oberstdorf
Bronze medal – third place	1991 Winnipeg
World Senior Championships
Gold medal – first place	2025 Fredericton
Gold medal – first place	2026 Geneva
Scottish Women's Championship
Gold medal – first place	1990
Gold medal – first place	1991
Gold medal – first place	1993
Gold medal – first place	1994

Claire Milne is a Scottish curler and curling coach.

She is a 1990, 1994 World silver medallist and a 1991 World bronze medallist.

She started curling in 1985 at Letham Grange Curling Rink.

== Teams ==
=== Women's ===
Season	Skip	Third	Second	Lead	Alternate	Coach	Events
1989–90	Carolyn Hutchison	Claire Milne	Mairi Milne	Tara Brown			WCC 1990 (silver)
1990–91	Gillian Barr	Claire Milne	Janice Watt	Anne Laird		Peter Loudon	WJCC 1991 (bronze)
1990–91	Christine Allison	Claire Milne	Mairi Milne	Margaret Richardson			WCC 1991 (bronze)
1991–92	Gillian Barr	Claire Milne	Janice Watt	Nikki Mauchline	Karen Addison	Peter Loudon	WJCC 1992 (gold)
1992–93	Christine Cannon	Claire Milne	Mairi Herd	Margaret Richardson	Jackie Lockhart		WCC 1993 (5th)
1993–94	Christine Cannon	Claire Milne	Mairi Herd	Janice Watt	Sheila Harvey		WCC 1994 (silver)
1994–95	Kirsty Hay	Edith Loudon	Joanna Pegg	Katie Loudon	Claire Milne	Peter Loudon	WCC 1995 (7th)
1995–96	Kirsty Hay	Edith Loudon	Karen Addison	Katie Loudon	Claire Milne	Peter Loudon	ECC 1995 (silver); WCC 1996 (5th)
1998–99	Rhona Martin	Gail McMillan	Mairi Herd	Janice Watt	Claire Milne	Russell Keiller, Peter Clark	ECC 1998 (silver)
2004–05	Kelly Wood	Lorna Vevers	Sheila Swan	Lindsay Wood	Claire Milne	Chris Hildrey (ECC), Mike Hay (WCC)	ECC 2004 (5th); WCC 2005 (6th)
2006–07	Rhona Martin	Debbie Knox	Claire Milne	Lynn Cameron	Jacqui Byers		ECC 2006 (4th)
2010–11	Claire Milne	Lynn Cameron	Rachael Simms	Katie Loudon			
2016–17	Claire Milne	Mairi Milne	Lynn Cameron-Thompson	Rachael Simms			

=== Mixed ===
Season	Skip	Third	Second	Lead	Events
1996	Brian Binnie	Claire Milne	Duncan Bertram	Alison Binnie	SMxCC 1996 (gold)
1997	Brian Binnie	Claire Milne	Warwick Smith	Alison Binnie	SMxCC 1997 (gold)
2003	Brian Binnie	Claire Milne	Ronald Brewster	Nancy Murdoch	SMxCC 2003 (silver)
2014	Graham Shaw	Claire Milne	Robin Niven	Mairi Milne	SMxCC 2014 (6th)

== Record as a coach of national teams ==
Year	Tournament, event	National team	Place
2003	2003 World Junior Curling Championships	Scotland (junior women)	7
2015	2015 Winter Universiade	United Kingdom (women)	7

== Personal life ==
Her sister Mairi Milne (Herd) was a longtime teammate.
