= Margaret Richardson (curler) =

Scottish curler and coach

- Curler ♀
- Born: Margaret Craig

Team
- Curling club: Hamilton & Thornyhill CC, Hamilton, East Kilbride & Haremyres CC, Lanarkshire, Wigtown CC, Stranraer

Curling career
- Member Association: Scotland
- World Championship: 4 (1985, 1986, 1991, 1993)
- European Championship: 1 (1983)
- Other appearances: World Senior Championships: 5 (2013, 2014, 2016, 2017, 2024)
Medal record
Curling
World Championships
Silver medal – second place	1985 Jönköping
Bronze medal – third place	1991 Winnipeg
Scottish Women's Championship
Gold medal – first place	1985
Gold medal – first place	1986
Gold medal – first place	1991
Gold medal – first place	1993
World Senior Championships
Gold medal – first place	2014 Dumfries
Gold medal – first place	2016 Karlstad
Bronze medal – third place	2017 Lethbridge
Bronze medal – third place	2024 Östersund

Margaret Richardson (born Margaret Craig) is a Scottish curler and curling coach.

She is a 1985 World silver medallist and a 1991 World bronze medallist.

== Personal life ==
Richardson began curling at age 17. She is a certified accountant and runs an insurance broking business with her husband. She has two daughters.

== Teams ==
Season	Skip	Third	Second	Lead	Alternate	Coach	Events
1982–83	Isobel Torrance Jr.	Margaret Craig	Jackie Steele	Sheila Harvey			SJCC 1983 (gold); EJCC 1983 (silver)
1983–84	Isobel Torrance Jr.	Margaret Craig	Jackie Steele	Sheila Harvey			ECC 1983 (4th)
1984–85	Isobel Torrance Jr.	Margaret Craig	Jackie Steele	Sheila Harvey			SWCC 1985 (gold); WCC 1985 (silver)
1985–86	Isobel Torrance Jr.	Margaret Craig	Jackie Steele	Sheila Harvey			SWCC 1986 (gold); WCC 1986 (4th)
1990–91	Christine Allison	Claire Milne	Mairi Milne	Margaret Richardson			WCC 1991 (bronze)
1992–93	Christine Cannon	Claire Milne	Mairi Herd	Margaret Richardson	Jackie Lockhart		WCC 1993 (5th)
2012–13	Christine Cannon	Margaret Richardson	Janet Lindsay	Margaret Robertson	Marion Craig	Isobel Hannen	WSCC 2013 (4th)
2013–14	Christine Cannon	Margaret Richardson	Isobel Hannen	Janet Lindsay	Margaret Robertson	Jackie Lockhart	WSCC 2014 (gold)
2015–16	Jackie Lockhart	Christine Cannon	Isobel Hannen	Margaret Richardson	Margaret Robertson		WSCC 2016 (gold)
2016–17	Jackie Lockhart	Christine Cannon	Isobel Hannen	Margaret Richardson	Janet Lindsay		WSCC 2017 (bronze)
