= Sheila Harvey =

Scottish curler

- Curler ♀

Team
- Curling club: Hamilton & Thornyhill CC, Hamilton, Wigtown CC, Stranraer

Curling career
- Member Association: Scotland
- World Championship: 3 (1985, 1986, 1994)
- European Championship: 1 (1983)
- Other appearances: European Junior Championships: 1 (1983)
Medal record
Curling
World Championships
Silver medal – second place	1985 Jönköping
Silver medal – second place	1994 Oberstdorf
Scottish Women's Championship
Gold medal – first place	1985
Gold medal – first place	1986

Sheila Harvey is a Scottish curler.

She is a two-time World women's silver medallist (1985, 1994).

== Teams ==
Season	Skip	Third	Second	Lead	Alternate	Events
1982–83	Isobel Torrance Jr.	Margaret Craig	Jackie Steele	Sheila Harvey		SJCC 1983 (gold); EJCC 1983 (silver)
1983–84	Isobel Torrance Jr.	Margaret Craig	Jackie Steele	Sheila Harvey		ECC 1983 (4th)
1984–85	Isobel Torrance Jr.	Margaret Craig	Jackie Steele	Sheila Harvey		SWCC 1985 (gold); WCC 1985 (silver)
1985–86	Isobel Torrance Jr.	Margaret Craig	Jackie Steele	Sheila Harvey		SWCC 1986 (gold); WCC 1986 (4th)
1993–94	Christine Cannon	Claire Milne	Mairi Herd	Janice Watt	Sheila Harvey	WCC 1994 (silver)
