= Lindsay Wood (curler) =

Scottish curler

- Curler ♀

Team
- Curling club: Dun CC

Curling career
- Member Association: Scotland
- World Championship: 3 (2005, 2006, 2007)
- European Championship: 3 (2004, 2007, 2008)
- Other appearances: World Junior Championships: 3 (1999, 2001, 2002)
Medal record
Curling
World Championships
Bronze medal – third place	2007 Aomori
European Championships
Silver medal – second place	2007 Füssen
Scottish Women's Championship
Gold medal – first place	2005
Gold medal – first place	2006
Gold medal – first place	2007

Lindsay Wood is a Scottish curler.

She is a 2007 World bronze medallist and a 2007 European silver medallist.

== Awards ==
- Frances Brodie Award: 2007
- World Junior Curling Championships All-Star Team, Women: 2002

== Teams ==
=== Women's ===
Season	Skip	Third	Second	Lead	Alternate	Coach	Events
1998–99	Kelly Wood	Lorna Vevers	Lindsay Wood	Janie Johnston	Jacqui Reid	Keith Prentice	WJCC 1999 (5th)
2000–01	Kelly Wood	Lorna Vevers	Jacqui Reid	Lindsay Wood	Susan Halliday (WJCC)	Cate Brewster	SJCC 2001 (gold); WJCC 2001 (5th)
2001–02	Kelly Wood	Lorna Vevers	Jacqui Reid	Lindsay Wood	Frances McKerrow	Cate Brewster	WJCC 2002 (5th)
2004–05	Kelly Wood	Lorna Vevers	Sheila Swan	Lindsay Wood	Claire Milne (ECC, WCC)	Chris Hildrey (ECC), Mike Hay (WCC)	ECC 2004 (5th); SWCC 2005 (gold); WCC 2005 (6th)
2005–06	Kelly Wood	Lorna Vevers	Kim Brewster	Lindsay Wood	Kerry Barr (WCC)		SWCC 2006 (gold); WCC 2006 (8th)
2006–07	Kelly Wood	Jackie Lockhart	Lorna Vevers	Lindsay Wood	Karen Addison (WCC)	Hew Chalmers	SWCC 2007 (gold); WCC 2007 (bronze)
2007–08	Kelly Wood	Jackie Lockhart	Lorna Vevers	Lindsay Wood	Karen Addison (ECC)	Hew Chalmers	ECC 2007 (silver); CCC 2007 (silver)
2008–09	Kelly Wood	Jackie Lockhart	Lorna Vevers	Lindsay Wood	Eve Muirhead	Alan Hannah	ECC 2008 (6th)
2009–10	Sarah Reid	Kerry Barr	Barbara McPake	Lindsay Wood			

=== Mixed ===
Season	Skip	Third	Second	Lead	Events
2000	Ross Mackay	Kelly Wood	Garry Mackay	Lindsay Wood	SMxCC 2000 (gold)
2003	Kelly Wood	Gary Wood	Lindsay Wood	Graeme Prentice	SMxCC 2003 (gold)
2004	Kelly Wood	Ross MacDonald	Lindsay Wood	Kenneth Edwards	SMxCC 2004 (gold)
