= Sandra Schmirler =

Canadian curler (1963–2000)

- Curler
- Schmirler at the 1998 Winter Olympics
- Other names: Sandra Peterson
- Born: June 11, 1963; Biggar, Saskatchewan, Canada
- Died: March 2, 2000 (aged 36); Regina, Saskatchewan, Canada

Curling career
- Hearts: 7 (1987, 1991, 1993, 1994, 1995, 1997, 1998)
- World Championship: 3 (1993, 1994, 1997)
- Olympic: 1 (1998)
Medal record
Women's curling
Representing Canada
Olympic Games
Gold medal – first place	1998 Nagano	Team
World Curling Championships
Gold medal – first place	1993 Geneva	Team
Gold medal – first place	1994 Oberstdorf	Team
Gold medal – first place	1997 Berne	Team
Representing Saskatchewan
Scott Tournament of Hearts
Gold medal – first place	1993 Brandon	Team
Gold medal – first place	1994 Kitchener-Waterloo	Team
Gold medal – first place	1997 Vancouver	Team
Bronze medal – third place	1995 Calgary	Team
Bronze medal – third place	1998 Regina	Team
Canadian Olympic Curling Trials
Gold medal – first place	1997 Brandon	Team

Sandra Marie Schmirler (June 11, 1963 – March 2, 2000) was a Canadian curler who captured three Canadian Curling Championships (Scott Tournament of Hearts) and three World Curling Championships. Schmirler also skipped (captained) her Canadian team to a gold medal at the 1998 Winter Olympics, the first year women's curling was a medal sport. At tournaments where she was not competing, Schmirler sometimes worked as a commentator for CBC Sports, which popularized her nickname "Schmirler the Curler" and claimed she was the only person who had a name that rhymed with the sport she played. She died in 2000 at 36 of cancer, leaving a legacy that extended outside of curling. Schmirler was honoured posthumously with an induction into the Canadian Sports Hall of Fame and was awarded the World Curling Freytag Award, which later led to her induction into the World Curling Federation Hall of Fame.

In 2019, Schmirler was named the second greatest Canadian female curler in history (after Jennifer Jones) in a TSN poll of broadcasters, reporters and top curlers. Schmirler's Olympic team, which also included Jan Betker, Joan McCusker and Marcia Gudereit, was named the greatest female Canadian curling team of all time as part of the same poll.

== Curling career ==
While attending Biggar Composite School in Biggar, Saskatchewan, Canada, Schmirler started curling in Grade 7 as part of the school's physical education program. She grew up an athlete, playing volleyball, badminton, and softball. She was also an avid speed swimmer. She continued to curl on the local scene, participating in the Biggar Curling Club ladies' league in Grade 9. Playing as third on her high school team, she won a provincial championship in Grade 12, when her team went undefeated throughout the season.

She continued to curl after graduating from high school, while attending the University of Saskatchewan, making her first appearance in Saskatchewan's provincial playdowns in 1983. Schmirler threw fourth stones for a team which consisted of 1979 Canadian Junior Champions Denise Wilson (skip), Dianne Choquette and Shannon Olafson. The team represented the University of Saskatchewan at the Saskatoon city playdowns where they were eliminated. After graduating university, Schmirler moved to Regina to take a job at the North West Leisure Centre. She continued to curl, and was given the nickname "Schmirler the Curler" by a supervisor at the facility. Schmirler joined the Saskatoon-based Carol Davis rink, playing third for the team. In their first season together, they made it to the 1984 provincial finals where they lost to Lori McGeary.

In 1987, as a member of Kathy Fahlman's rink, Schmirler won her first provincial championship, sending her to her first national championship, where she and her team finished in fourth place with a 7–5 win–loss record. The following season, the team lost in the A-B final of the 1988 provincials to Michelle Schneider (now Englot), eliminating them from a chance at a second straight trip to the Hearts. In the 1989 playdowns, Team Fahlman lost in the southern Saskatchewan playdowns, failing to even make it to the 1989 Saskatchewan Scott Tournament of Hearts.

Prior to the 1988–89 curling season, Schmirler and Jan Betker found themselves curling with different teammates, attempting to put together a stable squad. After a disappointing season, Schmirler decided to skip for the 1990–91 season, with Betker playing third. They recruited Joan Inglis (McCusker) to play second, and McCusker recommended Marcia Gudereit as a lead. This rink won the provincials in their first year together, defeating Kim Armbruster (Hodson) in the Saskatchewan final, 5–3. At the 1991 Scott Tournament of Hearts, the team finished in fourth place. In 1993, the Schmirler rink again won the provincial title, defeating Sherry Scheirich (Middaugh) in the final, 7–2. Representing Saskatchewan at the 1993 Scott Tournament of Hearts, her rink defeated Maureen Bonar in the finals, giving Saskatchewan its first national women's curling championship since Marj Mitchell's win in 1980. The rink moved on to the World Championship and defeated Janet Clews-Strayer from Germany in the final that year, winning Canada its sixth world women's title. The next season, she and her rink competed at the Tournament of Hearts as defending champions. The team finished first in the round robin, and defeated Connie Laliberte in the final to clinch a second consecutive Canadian championship. She and her team then represented Canada at the World Women's Curling Championship, where they finished first in the round robin. She then advanced to the playoffs, and won the semifinal against Josefine Einsle of Germany and the final against Christine Cannon of Scotland. With her win in the final, she and her team clinched their second world championships, equalling their run from the previous season. At the time, no other Canadian women's rink had won consecutive world championships. Schmirler returned to the Tournament of Hearts the next year as the defending champion. She and her team finished with an 8–3 win–loss record and advanced to the playoffs as the second seed. She lost her next two games, however, and failed to advance to the final, losing a chance to win a third consecutive title. The next season, Schmirler added Renelle Bryden to the lineup, as McCusker took the year off. For the 1996 Saskatchewan Tournament of Hearts, Gudereit who had been playing second was replaced for health reasons by Karen Daku. At the provincial Hearts, the team fell to Sherry Scheirich (now Middaugh) in the final.

In 1997, Schmirler and her rink returned to the Tournament of Hearts, where they finished with a 9–2 win–loss record in the round robin. They advanced to the playoffs, and defeated Alison Goring of Ontario twice en route to winning her third Canadian championship. They then went to the World Championships, where they again finished first in the round robin and advanced to the playoffs, defeating Helena Blach Lavrsen of Denmark in the semifinals and Andrea Schöpp of Germany in the final to win a third world title. After each of these three seasons, her rink was named "Team of the Year" by Sask Sport.

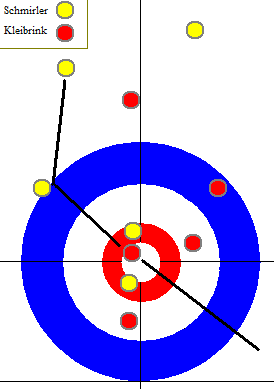
Schmirler's in-off for three to win the 1997 Canadian Olympic Curling Trials against Shannon Kleibrink is one of her most famous shots, both in terms of degree of difficulty and for the fact that it sent her team to the 1998 Winter Olympics.

In the 1998 Winter Olympics, curling became a medal sport for the first time. Olympic trials were held in November 1997 to select Canada's representatives at the Olympics. Schmirler qualified for the Trials through a best of three series against Connie Laliberte held in December 1995. At the Trials, the Schmirler rink finished first in the round robin, and defeated Shannon Kleibrink in the final with a score of 9–6, behind strong shot making from Schmirler and McCusker. Schmirler made a difficult in-off to win and clinch the berth to the Olympics. The 1998 Winter Olympics were held in Nagano, Japan. The Schmirler rink was among the favourites for gold, but there was a strong field in the event. After finishing the round robin in first place with six wins and one loss, Canada played their semifinal game against Great Britain's Kirsty Hay. The game was tied after regulation play and went to an extra end, where Schmirler barely made a draw with her last rock to win the game. In the final against Denmark's Helena Blach Lavrsen, Schmirler secured a win in nine ends, winning Canada the gold medal. After winning the gold medal, Sandra appeared on the front page of The New York Times. After the Olympics, the Schmirler rink was named 'Team of the Year' by the Canadian Press. The team were also inducted into the Canadian Curling Hall of Fame in 1999. After returning from the Olympics, Schmirler and her rink had to compete almost immediately in the Scott Tournament of Hearts as Team Canada. Schmirler and her team made the playoffs, and won the 3 vs. 4 playoff game before dropping the semifinal to Anne Merklinger. After losing in the semis, Schmirler joined CBC as a colour commentator for the final match.

=== Teams ===
Season	Skip	Third	Second	Lead	Events
1981–82	Ellen Meschisnick	Judy Walker	Sandra Schmirler	Jodi Bruce	
1982–83	Sandra Schmirler (fourth)	Denise Wilson (skip)	Dianne Choquette	Shannon Olafson	
1983–84	Carol Davis	Sandra Schmirler	Heather MacMillan	Laurie Secord	1984 Sask.
1984–85	Carol Davis	Sandra Schmirler	Heather MacMillan	Laurie Secord	
1985–86	Kathy Fahlman	Sandra Schmirler	Jan Betker	Sheila Schneider	
1986–87	Kathy Fahlman	Sandra Schmirler	Jan Betker	Sheila Schneider	1987 Sask., STOH, COCT
1987–88	Kathy Fahlman	Sandra Schmirler	Jan Betker	Sheila Schneider	1988 Sask.
1988–89	Kathy Fahlman	Sandra Peterson	Jan Betker	Joan Inglis	
1989–90	Susan Lang	Sandra Peterson	Jan Betker	Gertie Pick	
1990–91	Sandra Peterson	Jan Betker	Joan Inglis	Marcia Schiml	1991 Sask., STOH
1991–92	Sandra Peterson	Jan Betker	Joan Inglis	Marcia Schiml	1992 Sask.
1992–93	Sandra Peterson	Jan Betker	Joan McCusker	Marcia Schiml	1993 Sask., STOH
1993–94	Sandra Peterson	Jan Betker	Joan McCusker	Marcia Gudereit	1994 STOH
1994–95	Sandra Peterson	Jan Betker	Joan McCusker	Marcia Gudereit	1995 STOH
1995–96	Sandra Peterson	Jan Betker	Marcia Gudereit; Karen Daku	Pamela Bryden	1996 Sask.
1996–97	Sandra Schmirler	Jan Betker	Joan McCusker	Marcia Gudereit	1997 Sask., STOH
1997–98	Sandra Schmirler	Jan Betker	Joan McCusker	Marcia Gudereit	1997 COCT, 1998 STOH, OG
1998–99	Sandra Schmirler	Jan Betker	Joan McCusker	Marcia Gudereit	1999 Sask.

=== Career statistics ===
Year	Team	Position	Event	Finish	Record	Pct. (Note: Shot percentage. Round robin only, except for career total.)
1987	Saskatchewan (Fahlman)	Third	STOH	4th	7–5	75
1987	Fahlman	Third	COCT	4th	4–4	N/A
1991	Saskatchewan (Peterson)	Skip	STOH	4th	8–6	71
1993	Saskatchewan (Peterson)	Skip	STOH	1st	10–2	79
1993	Canada (Peterson)	Skip	WCC	1st	9–2	N/A
1994	Canada (Peterson)	Skip	STOH	1st	11–1	80
1994	Canada (Peterson)	Skip	WCC	1st	10–1	N/A
1995	Canada (Peterson)	Skip	STOH	3rd	9–5	81
1997	Saskatchewan (Schmirler)	Skip	STOH	1st	11–2	80
1997	Canada (Schmirler)	Skip	WCC	1st	10–1	N/A
1997	Schmirler	Skip	COCT	1st	8–2	–
1998	Canada (Schmirler)	Skip	OG	1st	8–1	79
1998	Canada (Schmirler)	Skip	STOH	3rd	8–5	75
Scott Tournament of Hearts Totals					64–26	77
World Championships Totals					29–4	N/A

== Personal life ==
=== Family and education ===
Schmirler was born to parents Shirley and Art Schmirler on June 11, 1963. She was born with a club foot, which required her to wear a cast for two months. She had two older sisters, Carol and Beverley. She attended high school in Biggar, and moved to Saskatoon to attend university. She started out towards a degree in computer science, but transferred after her first year to work for a degree in physical education. She convocated with a Bachelor of Science in Physical Education in 1985.

In 1993, teammate Marcia Gudereit introduced Schmirler to Shannon England. On June 22, 1996, they were married. In 1997, Schmirler was pregnant with their first child. When this information was revealed to reporters at the Scott Tournament of Hearts, they jokingly dubbed her "Schmirler the Hurler". On September 15, 1997, their daughter Sara Marion was born. In April 1999, Sandra's father Art Schmirler died from esophageal cancer. On June 30, 1999, the couple's second daughter, Jenna Shirley, was born.

=== Illness and death ===
After Jenna's birth, Schmirler experienced many health problems. She had suffered from back pain, which was thought to be pregnancy related, and following Jenna's birth, she began to suffer from stomach pains. Tests showed that a cancerous node the size of a fist had developed behind her heart. As her condition worsened, she underwent surgery on September 6, 1999. During surgery, a dead piece of the tumour broke off and released a blood clot into her lung. Her heart stopped beating, and only emergency heart massage kept her alive. Almost a month after being diagnosed with cancer, doctors finally provided a specific diagnosis – metastatic adenocarcinoma, with an unknown primary site. Because no one could pin down where the cancer came from, Sandra referred to it as "the cancer from Mars." In addition to chemotherapy and radiation, Schmirler explored orthomolecular medicine through the Canadian Cancer Research Group. This form of alternative medicine involves large doses of vitamins and nutrients.

In 2000, Schmirler worked as colour commentator for CBC during Canada's national junior curling championships. During her illness, Schmirler had been largely removed from the public eye. While in Moncton for the championships, Schmirler held a press conference to update her situation. In speaking publicly about her ordeal for the first time, Schmirler spared few details about what she had gone through, while also expressing her hope for the future: "There were three goals I had coming out of this thing, and the first one was to look after my family. And the second one...because I curl so much, I've never taken a hot vacation, so I'm going to put my feet in the sand in a warm place. And the last one was to actually be here today, and I thank CBC, I thank Lawrence (Kimber), and Joan Mead."

After returning from Moncton, Schmirler felt physically well, but suffered a setback when a CAT scan revealed spots around her lungs. The decision was made not to proceed with further chemotherapy, but she continued with the orthomolecular therapy. She had been scheduled to work the 2000 Scott Tournament of Hearts, but was unable to do so. She faxed a statement from the hospital, which was read by TSN's Vic Rauter. "I'm still fighting hard and I still hope to make it to the Brier, not playing but talking. For Saskatchewan, I was hoping to be in your green shoes (at the Scott). But keep things in perspective. There are other things in life besides curling, which I have found. But I hope to be on the curling trail again next year. And I'll see you all in Sudbury (the next Scott site) in 2001. Your curling friend, Sandra." However, the optimism in her statement belied the seriousness of her condition. She had been moved to palliative care. She died in her sleep at the Pasqua Hospital Palliative Care Unit on the morning of March 2, 2000, at age 36.

Her death caused reactions not just within Saskatchewan and the curling community, but also across the country. Canadian Prime Minister Jean Chrétien said in a statement:

All Canadians have been touched by the untimely death of Sandra Schmirler. Most of us came to know her through her exploits as a champion curler and as an exemplary sports ambassador for Canada. But what really set her apart was her bright, engaging personality and her incredible zest for life, qualities that were so clearly in evidence as she fought so valiantly against her illness. She will be sorely missed.

In honour of Schmirler, flags at provincial office buildings in Saskatchewan were lowered to half-staff.

TSN offered to broadcast her funeral live and to make the signal available to any other stations at no charge. Her husband, Shannon England, agreed to the broadcast on the condition that the family would not be shown during the service. CBC also broadcast the service, marking the first time a Canadian athlete's funeral had been televised live on two networks. The Brier was just getting underway and games in the afternoon draw were delayed to allow curlers and fans to watch the funeral, which was broadcast on screens at the rink. Regina's Agridome and Schmirler's home Caledonian Curling Club also opened to show the funeral. Nine hundred people attended the service at the Regina Funeral Home, thousands watched at satellite locations around the province, and hundreds of thousands watched on television. The funeral was conducted by the Rev. Don Wells, and Sandra was eulogized by Brian McCusker, teammate Joan McCusker's husband.

== Awards and honours ==
In addition to the titles captured by her team on the ice, Schmirler has been recognized in several different ways off the ice as well. In 2000, Schmirler was awarded the Saskatchewan Order of Merit, becoming the first posthumous recipient. Along with the other members of her rink, she had been previously awarded an honorary Doctor of Laws degree from the University of Regina. In the fall of 2000, Schmirler was inducted into the Canadian Sports Hall of Fame. Schmirler and her team were inducted into the Saskatchewan Sports Hall of Fame on two separate occasions, once in 1997 for winning three World Curling Championships and once in 2001 for winning the gold medal at the Olympics. At the annual Scotties Tournament of Hearts, the top player in the playoff round is awarded the Sandra Schmirler Most Valuable Player Award.

After her death, the city of Regina honoured Schmirler in several ways. The South East Leisure Centre where she used to work was renamed the "Sandra Schmirler Leisure Centre," and the road leading up to the Callie Curling Club, where her team curled out of, was renamed "Sandra Schmirler Way." Schmirler's hometown of Biggar also honoured her memory with the construction of "The Sandra Schmirler Olympic Gold Park."

The Sandra Schmirler Foundation was established in May 2001 by a group of Sandra Schmirler's friends and teammates to honor her legacy. The Foundation supports the care of premature and critically ill infants by funding life-saving equipment for hospital neonatal intensive care units across Canada, including all provinces, the Yukon, and the Northwest Territories. Millions of dollars have been donated to date, and the Foundation continues to expand its support through the contributions of donors. Schmirler's commitment to helping others and her enduring impact on Canadian families are recognized through the ongoing work of the Foundation.

On January 7, 2009, Sandra was named the winner of the 2009 World Curling Freytag Award (later incorporated into the WCF Hall of Fame). The award, named after American Elmer Freytag, who founded the World Curling Federation, honours curlers for championship play, sportsmanship, character and extraordinary achievement. Her husband and daughters accepted the award on her behalf at the 2009 World Men's Curling Championship.

== Bibliography ==
- Lefko, Perry (2000). Sandra Schmirler: The Queen of Curling. Stoddart Publishing Co. Ltd. ISBN 0-7737-3275-6.
