= Anita Ford =

Canadian curler and coach

- Curler
- Born: October 3, 1947 (age 79); Regina, Saskatchewan, Canada

Team
- Curling club: Caledonian CC, Regina, SK

Curling career
- Member Association: Saskatchewan
- Hearts: 4 (1991, 1993, 1994, 1995)
- World Championship: 2 (1993, 1994)
Medal record
Curling
Representing Canada
World Championships
| Gold medal – first place | 1993 Geneva |
| Gold medal – first place | 1994 Oberstdorf |
Representing Saskatchewan
Scotties Tournament of Hearts
| Gold medal – first place | 1993 Brandon |
| Gold medal – first place | 1994 Waterloo |
| Bronze medal – third place | 1995 Calgary |

Anita Ford (born October 3, 1947) is a Canadian curler and curling coach from Regina, Saskatchewan. She is known as the alternate and later coach of the Sandra Schmirler team.

She is a two-time World women's champion (1993, 1994) and two-time Canadian women's champion (1993, 1994).

In 1999, she was inducted into Canadian Curling Hall of Fame together with all of the Sandra Schmirler team.

== Teams and events ==
| Season | Skip | Third | Second | Lead | Alternate | Events |
|---|---|---|---|---|---|---|
| 1970–71 | Val Spencer | Anita Ford | Mary Bennet | Georgie Reichel | | |
| 1971–72 | Beth Lake | Amy Gilroy | Mary Entwistle | Anita Ford | | |
| 1979–80 | Crystal Brunas | Anita Ford | Randi Kelly | Nelda McDonald | | |
| 1980–81 | Crystal Brunas | Anita Ford | Randi Kelly | Nelda McDonald | | |
| 1990–91 | Sandra Peterson | Jan Betker | Joan Inglis | Marcia Schiml | Anita Ford | STOH 1991 (4th) |
| 1992–93 | Sandra Peterson | Jan Betker | Joan McCusker | Marcia Schiml | Anita Ford | STOH 1993 (gold); WCC 1993 (gold) |
| 1993–94 | Sandra Peterson | Jan Betker | Joan McCusker | Marcia Gudereit | Anita Ford | STOH 1994 (gold); WCC 1994 (gold) |
| 1994–95 | Sandra Peterson | Jan Betker | Joan McCusker | Marcia Gudereit | Anita Ford | STOH 1995 (bronze) |
| 2003–04 | Crystal Frisk | Anita Ford | Randi Kelly | Dawne Obleman | Pat Reeve | CSCC 2004 (6th) |
| 2004–05 | Crystal Frisk | Anita Ford | Randi Kelly | Dawne Obleman | | CSCC 2005 (12th) |
| 2010–11 | Nancy Kerr | Anita Ford | Dawn Obleman | Wendy Leach | | |

== Record as a coach of club teams ==
| Year | Tournament, event | Team | Skip | Place |
|---|---|---|---|---|
| 1997 | 1997 Scott Tournament of Hearts | Saskatchewan | Sandra Schmirler | 1st place, gold medalist(s) |
| 1997 | 1997 Canadian Olympic Curling Trials | | Sandra Schmirler | 1st place, gold medalist(s) |
| 1998 | 1998 Scott Tournament of Hearts | Saskatchewan | Sandra Schmirler | 3rd place, bronze medalist(s) |
| 2008 | 2008 Scotties Tournament of Hearts | Saskatchewan | Michelle Englot | 7 |

== Record as a coach of national teams ==
| Year | Tournament, event | National team | Place |
|---|---|---|---|
| 1998 | 1998 Winter Olympics | Canada (women) | 1st place, gold medalist(s) |

== Private life ==
Anita Ford is from a family of curlers. Her husband Gary (died 2004) was a four-time Saskatchewan men's curling champion from 1968 to 1971. They have two daughters, both of which are also curlers, Atina Ford and Cindy Simmons. Atina is an Olympic and Canadian champion, and sometime part of the Schmirler team. Simmons played in the STOH 2008 with Michelle Englot.
