= Tatiana Smirnova =

Russian curler

Personal information
- Nationality: Russian

Sport
- Sport: Curling

Achievements and titles
- World finals: 5 (2015, 2016, 2017, 2018, 2019)

Tatiana Smirnova is a Russian curler. She competed at the World Senior Curling Championships in 2015, 2016, 2017, 2018, and 2019.
