= Drummie =

Drummie is the name of:

- Drummie Zeb (born 1959), British musician
- Richard Drummie (born 1959), British musician
- Sheena Drummie, Scottish curler

== See also ==
- Drummie awards; see DRUM!
