= 1993 World Women's Curling Championship =

- Host city: Geneva, Switzerland
- Arena: Patinoire des Vernets
- Dates: March 28-April 4, 1993
- Winner: Canada
- Curling club: Caledonian CC, Regina, Saskatchewan
- Skip: Sandra Peterson
- Third: Jan Betker
- Second: Joan McCusker
- Lead: Marcia Gudereit
- Alternate: Anita Ford
- Finalist: Germany (Janet Strayer)

The 1993 World Women's Curling Championship was held at the Patinoire des Vernets in Geneva, Switzerland from March 28–April 4, 1993.

== Teams ==
| Canada | England | Finland | Germany |
|---|---|---|---|
| Caledonian CC, Regina Skip: Sandra Peterson; Third: Jan Betker; Second: Joan McCusker; Lead: Marcia Gudereit; Alternate: Anita Ford | Bradford CC Skip: Sally Gray; Third: Sarah Johnston; Second: Janice Manson; Lead: Pamela Wright; Alternate: Alison Bowman | Hyvinkää CC Skip: Jaana Jokela; Third: Terhi Aro; Second: Heidi Koskiheimo; Lead: Mari Lundén; Alternate: Marita Ripatti | Füssen CC Skip: Janet Strayer; Third: Josefine Einsle; Second: Petra Tschetsch-Hiltensberger; Lead: Karin Fischer; Alternate: Elisabeth Ländle |
| Japan | Norway | Scotland | Sweden |
| Obihiro CC, Hokkaido Skip: Mayumi Seguchi; Third: Mayumi Abe; Second: Hidemi Itai; Lead: Akemi Niwa; Alternate: Naomi Kawano | Snarøen CC, Oslo Skip: Dordi Nordby; Third: Hanne Pettersen; Second: Marianne Aspelin; Lead: Cecilie Torhaug | Wigtown CC, Stranraer Skip: Christine Cannon; Third: Claire Milne; Second: Mairi Herd; Lead: Margaret Richardson; Alternate: Jackie Lockhart | Umeå CK Skip: Elisabet Johansson; Third: Katarina Nyberg; Second: Louise Marmont; Lead: Elisabeth Persson; Alternate: Annika Lööf |
| Switzerland | United States | | |
| Lausanne-Olympique CC Skip: Janet Hürlimann; Third: Angela Lutz; Second: Laurence Bidaud; Lead: Sandrine Mercier; Alternate: Laurence Morisetti | Denver CC, Colorado Skip: Sharon O'Brien; Third: Dawna Bennett; Second: Susan Anschuetz; Lead: Pam Finch; Alternate: Kathy Frankowiak | | |

== Round robin standings ==
Key
| Teams to playoffs |
| Teams to tiebreaker |

| Country | Skip | W | L |
|---|---|---|---|
| Germany | Janet Strayer | 8 | 1 |
| Sweden | Elisabet Johansson | 7 | 2 |
| Canada | Sandra Peterson | 7 | 2 |
| Scotland | Christine Cannon | 6 | 3 |
| Norway | Dordi Nordby | 6 | 3 |
| Japan | Mayumi Seguchi | 3 | 6 |
| Switzerland | Janet Hürlimann | 3 | 6 |
| England | Sally Gray | 2 | 7 |
| United States | Sharon O'Brien | 2 | 7 |
| Finland | Jaana Jokela | 1 | 8 |

== Round robin results ==
=== Draw 1 ===
| Sheet A | Final |
| England (Gray) | 9 |
| United States (O'Brien) | 8 |

| Sheet B | Final |
| Finland (Jokela) | 6 |
| Scotland (Cannon) | 7 |

| Sheet C | Final |
| Germany (Strayer) | 7 |
| United States (O'Brien) | 3 |

| Sheet D | Final |
| Sweden (Johansson) | 10 |
| Japan (Mayumi) | 3 |

| Sheet E | Final |
| Canada (Peterson) | 12 |
| Norway (Nordby) | 3 |

=== Draw 2 ===
| Sheet A | Final |
| Finland (Jokela) | 4 |
| Norway (Nordby) | 12 |

| Sheet B | Final |
| Germany (Strayer) | 6 |
| England (Gray) | 5 |

| Sheet C | Final |
| Japan (Mayumi) | 2 |
| Scotland (Cannon) | 11 |

| Sheet D | Final |
| Canada (Peterson) | 6 |
| Switzerland (Hürlimann) | 5 |

| Sheet E | Final |
| Sweden (Johansson) | 15 |
| United States (O'Brien) | 2 |

=== Draw 3 ===
| Sheet A | Final |
| Norway (Nordby) | 8 |
| Germany (Strayer) | 5 |

| Sheet B | Final |
| England (Gray) | 2 |
| Finland (Jokela) | 11 |

| Sheet C | Final |
| Canada (Peterson) | 3 |
| Sweden (Johansson) | 10 |

| Sheet D | Final |
| Switzerland (Hürlimann) | 6 |
| Scotland (Cannon) | 7 |

| Sheet E | Final |
| United States (O'Brien) | 8 |
| Japan (Mayumi) | 6 |

=== Draw 4 ===
| Sheet A | Final |
| Scotland (Cannon) | 6 |
| Norway (Nordby) | 3 |

| Sheet B | Final |
| United States (O'Brien) | 7 |
| Finland (Jokela) | 6 |

| Sheet C | Final |
| England (Gray) | 3 |
| Canada (Peterson) | 13 |

| Sheet D | Final |
| Japan (Mayumi) | 3 |
| Germany (Strayer) | 12 |

| Sheet E | Final |
| Sweden (Johansson) | 7 |
| Switzerland (Hürlimann) | 6 |

=== Draw 5 ===
| Sheet A | Final |
| Switzerland (Hürlimann) | 8 |
| Japan (Mayumi) | 4 |

| Sheet B | Final |
| Scotland (Cannon) | 12 |
| England (Gray) | 1 |

| Sheet C | Final |
| Germany (Strayer) | 6 |
| Sweden (Johansson) | 5 |

| Sheet D | Final |
| Finland (Jokela) | 3 |
| Canada (Peterson) | 11 |

| Sheet E | Final |
| Norway (Nordby) | 10 |
| United States (O'Brien) | 6 |

=== Draw 6 ===
| Sheet A | Final |
| Norway (Nordby) | 8 |
| England (Gray) | 6 |

| Sheet B | Final |
| Scotland (Cannon) | 4 |
| Sweden (Johansson) | 7 |

| Sheet C | Final |
| Japan (Mayumi) | 3 |
| Canada (Peterson) | 12 |

| Sheet D | Final |
| Germany (Strayer) | 10 |
| Finland (Jokela) | 7 |

| Sheet E | Final |
| Switzerland (Hürlimann) | 9 |
| United States (O'Brien) | 5 |

=== Draw 7 ===
| Sheet A | Final |
| Sweden (Johansson) | 9 |
| England (Gray) | 5 |

| Sheet B | Final |
| Norway (Nordby) | 9 |
| Japan (Mayumi) | 3 |

| Sheet C | Final |
| Switzerland (Hürlimann) | 7 |
| Finland (Jokela) | 4 |

| Sheet D | Final |
| Germany (Strayer) | 8 |
| Canada (Peterson) | 7 |

| Sheet E | Final |
| Scotland (Cannon) | 11 |
| United States (O'Brien) | 2 |

=== Draw 8 ===
| Sheet A | Final |
| Canada (Peterson) | 9 |
| United States (O'Brien) | 3 |

| Sheet B | Final |
| Sweden (Johansson) | 5 |
| Norway (Nordby) | 8 |

| Sheet C | Final |
| Japan (Mayumi) | 10 |
| Finland (Jokela) | 5 |

| Sheet D | Final |
| Switzerland (Hürlimann) | 5 |
| England (Gray) | 10 |

| Sheet E | Final |
| Scotland (Cannon) | 4 |
| Germany (Strayer) | 6 |

=== Draw 9 ===
| Sheet A | Final |
| Norway (Nordby) | 5 |
| Switzerland (Hürlimann) | 6 |

| Sheet B | Final |
| England (Gray) | 4 |
| Japan (Mayumi) | 10 |

| Sheet C | Final |
| United States (O'Brien) | 3 |
| Germany (Strayer) | 6 |

| Sheet D | Final |
| Canada (Peterson) | 7 |
| Scotland (Cannon) | 5 |

| Sheet E | Final |
| Finland (Jokela) | 3 |
| Sweden (Johansson) | 10 |

== Tiebreakers ==
| Sheet A | Final |
| Norway (Nordby) | 6 |
| Scotland (Cannon) | 5 |

| Sheet B | Final |
| United States (O'Brien) | 6 |
| England (Gray) | 1 |

== Playoffs ==
=== Brackets ===
Semi-final
1 | Germany | 5
4 | Norway | 3
2 | Sweden | 7
3 | Canada | 10

Final
1 | Germany | 3
3 | Canada | 5

=== Final ===
| Sheet A | 1 | 2 | 3 | 4 | 5 | 6 | 7 | 8 | 9 | 10 | Final |
|---|---|---|---|---|---|---|---|---|---|---|---|
| Germany (Strayer) | 0 | 0 | 0 | 1 | 0 | 1 | 0 | 1 | 0 | X | 3 |
| Canada (Peterson) | 0 | 1 | 0 | 0 | 2 | 0 | 1 | 0 | 1 | X | 5 |
