= Mairi Milne =

Scottish female curler

- Curler ♀
- Other names: Mairi Herd

Team
- Curling club: Greenacres CC, Renfrewshire; East Kilbride & Haremyres CC, Lanarkshire, Wigtown CC, Stranraer
- Skip: Jackie Lockhart
- Third: Mairi Milne
- Second: Wendy Johnston
- Lead: Katie Loudon
- Alternate: Edith Hazard

Curling career
- Member Association: Scotland
- World Championship: 4 (1990, 1991, 1993, 1994)
- European Championship: 1 (1998)
Medal record
Curling
World Championships
Silver medal – second place	1990 Västerås
Silver medal – second place	1994 Oberstdorf
Bronze medal – third place	1991 Winnipeg
World Senior Championships
Gold medal – first place	2025 Fredericton
Gold medal – first place	2026 Geneva
Silver medal – second place	2023 Gangneung
Bronze medal – third place	2022 Geneva
European Championships
Silver medal – second place	1998 Flims
Scottish Women's Championship
Gold medal – first place	1990
Gold medal – first place	1991
Gold medal – first place	1993
Gold medal – first place	1994

Mairi Milne (also known as Mairi Herd) is a Scottish curler and curling coach.

She is a 1990, 1994 World silver medallist and a 1991 World bronze medallist. She is also a 1998 European silver medallist.

== Teams ==
Season	Skip	Third	Second	Lead	Alternate	Coach	Events
1989–90	Carolyn Hutchison	Claire Milne	Mairi Milne	Tara Brown			WCC 1990 (silver)
1990–91	Christine Allison	Claire Milne	Mairi Milne	Margaret Richardson			WCC 1991 (bronze)
1992–93	Christine Cannon	Claire Milne	Mairi Herd	Margaret Richardson	Jackie Lockhart		WCC 1993 (5th)
1993–94	Christine Cannon	Claire Milne	Mairi Herd	Janice Watt	Sheila Harvey		WCC 1994 (silver)
1998–99	Rhona Martin	Gail McMillan	Mairi Herd	Janice Watt	Claire Milne	Russell Keiller, Peter Clark	ECC 1998 (silver)
2005–06	Edith Loudon	Mairi Milne	Sheila Swan	Katie Loudon			SWCC 2006 (4th)
2016–17	Claire Milne	Mairi Milne	Lynn Cameron-Thompson	Rachael Simms			

== Record as a coach of national teams ==
Year	Tournament, event	National team	Place
2017	2017 Winter Universiade	United Kingdom (women)	5

== Personal life ==
Her sister Claire Milne is also a curler and a coach. They were longtime teammates.
