= Christine Cannon =

Scottish curler

- Curler ♀
- Other names: Christine Allison

Team
- Curling club: Lanarkshire Ice Rink, Hamilton, East Kilbride & Haremyres CC, Lanarkshire, Wigtown CC, Stranraer

Curling career
- Member Association: Scotland
- World Championship: 5 (1988, 1989, 1991, 1993, 1994)
- Other appearances: World Senior Championships: 4 (2013, 2014, 2016, 2017)
Medal record
Curling
World Championships
Silver medal – second place	1994 Oberstdorf
Bronze medal – third place	1991 Winnipeg
Scottish Women's Championship
Gold medal – first place	1988
Gold medal – first place	1989
Gold medal – first place	1991
Gold medal – first place	1993
Gold medal – first place	1994

Christine Cannon (born as Christine Allison) is a Scottish curler.

Cannon is a 1994 World silver medallist and a 1991 World bronze medallist. She also won bronze at the 2017 World Senior Championships.

Her husband is fellow Scottish curler Jim Cannon, 1989 European champion.

== Teams ==
Season	Skip	Third	Second	Lead	Alternate	Coach	!Events
1987–88	Christine Allison	Margaret Scott	Kimmie Brown	Sheena Drummie			WCC 1988 (9th)
1988–89	Christine Allison	Margaret Scott	Kimmie Brown	Carol Dawson			WCC 1989 (7th)
1990–91	Christine Allison	Claire Milne	Mairi Milne	Margaret Richardson			WCC 1991 (bronze)
1992–93	Christine Cannon	Claire Milne	Mairi Herd	Margaret Richardson	Jackie Lockhart		WCC 1993 (5th)
1993–94	Christine Cannon	Claire Milne	Mairi Herd	Janice Watt	Sheila Harvey		WCC 1994 (silver)
2012–13	Christine Cannon	Margaret Richardson	Janet Lindsay	Margaret Robertson	Marion Craig	Isobel Hannen	WSCC 2013 (4th)
2013–14	Christine Cannon	Margaret Richardson	Isobel Hannen	Janet Lindsay	Margaret Robertson	Jackie Lockhart	WSCC 2014 (gold)
2015–16	Jackie Lockhart	Christine Cannon	Isobel Hannen	Margaret Richardson	Margaret Robertson		WSCC 2016 (gold)
2016–17	Jackie Lockhart	Christine Cannon	Isobel Hannen	Margaret Richardson	Janet Lindsay		WSCC 2017 (bronze)
