= Karin Fischer =

German curler

- Curler ♀
- Born: 7 January 1972 (age 54); Füssen, Germany

Team
- Curling club: CC Füssen

Curling career
- Member Association: Germany
- World Championship: 4 (1992, 1993, 1994, 2000)
- European Championship: 1 (1993)
- Olympic: 1 (2002)
Medal record
Curling
World Championships
Silver medal – second place	1993 Genf
Bronze medal – third place	1994 Oberstdorf
German Women's Championship
Gold medal – first place	1992
Gold medal – first place	1993
Gold medal – first place	1994
Silver medal – second place	2001
Bronze medal – third place	2004

Karin Fischer (born 7 January 1972 in Füssen) is a former German curler.

She competed at the 2002 Winter Olympics, finishing in 5th place.

== Teams ==
Season	Skip	Third	Second	Lead	Alternate	Coach	Events
1991–92	Josefine Einsle	Petra Tschetsch-Hiltensberger	Elisabeth Ländle	Karin Fischer	Almut Hege-Schöll (WCC)		GWCC 1992 (gold); WCC 1992 (8th)
1992–93	Janet Strayer	Josefine Einsle	Petra Tschetsch-Hiltensberger	Karin Fischer	Elisabeth Ländle		GWCC 1993 (gold); WCC 1993 (silver)
1993–94	Josefine Einsle	Petra Tschetsch-Hiltensberger	Elisabeth Ländle	Karin Fischer	Michaela Greif		ECC 1993 (6th)
1993–94	Josefine Einsle	Michaela Greif	Petra Tschetsch-Hiltensberger	Sabine Weber	Karin Fischer		GWCC 1994 (gold)
1993–94	Josefine Einsle	Michaela Greif	Karin Fischer	Elisabeth Ländle	Sabine Weber		WCC 1994 (bronze)
1999–00	Petra Tschetsch	Daniela Jentsch	Karin Fischer	Gesa Angrick	Elisabeth Ländle	Keith Wendorf	WCC 2000 (6th)
2000–01	Petra Tschetsch-Hiltensberger	Josefine Heinzle	Karin Fischer	Gesa Angrick	Elisabeth Ländle		GWCC 2001 (silver)
2001–02	Natalie Nessler	Sabine Belkofer	Heike Wieländer	Andrea Stock	Karin Fischer	Rainer Schöpp	OG 2002 (5th)
2003–04	Natalie Nessler	Andrea Stock	Sabine Belkofer	Katja Weisser	Karin Fischer		GWCC 2004 (bronze)
2004–05	Natalie Nessler	Andrea Stock	Sabine Belkofer-Kröhnert	Karin Fischer			
2006–07	Josephine Obermann	Sina Frey	Karin Fischer	Katja Weisser			
