= Petra Tschetsch =

German curler

- Curler ♀
- Born: 3 October 1960 (age 66)

Team
- Curling club: EC Oberstdorf, CC Füssen

Curling career
- Member Association: Germany
- World Championship: 4 (1984, 1992, 1993, 2000)
- World Mixed Championship: 3 (2015, 2016, 2019)
- European Championship: 5 (1982, 1984, 1985, 1993, 2004)
- Other appearances: European Mixed Curling Championship: 1 (2013)
Medal record
Curling
World Championships
Silver medal – second place	1993 Geneva
Bronze medal – third place	1984 Perth
World Mixed Championship
Silver medal – second place	2019 Aberdeen
European Championships
Gold medal – first place	1984 Morzine
European Mixed Championship
Gold medal – first place	2013 Edinburgh
German Women's Championship
Gold medal – first place	1992
Gold medal – first place	1993
Gold medal – first place	1994
Gold medal – first place	2000
Silver medal – second place	1998
Silver medal – second place	2001
Silver medal – second place	2002
Bronze medal – third place	2003

Petra Tschetsch (also known as Petra Tschetsch-Hiltensberger) is a former German curler.

She is a former European champion (1984) and European mixed champion (2013).

== Teams ==
=== Women's ===
Season	Skip	Third	Second	Lead	Alternate	Coach	Events
1982–83	Almut Hege	Josefine Einsle	Suzanne Koch	Petra Tschetsch			ECC 1982 (9th); WCC CR 1982 (gold)
1983–84	Almut Hege	Josefine Einsle	Suzanne Koch	Petra Tschetsch			WCC 1984 (bronze)
1984–85	Almut Hege	Josefine Einsle	Suzanne Koch	Petra Tschetsch			ECC 1984 (gold)
1985–86	Almut Hege	Petra Tschetsch	Suzanne Fink	Josefine Einsle			ECC 1985 (6th)
1991–92	Josefine Einsle	Petra Tschetsch-Hiltensberger	Elisabeth Ländle	Karin Fischer	Almut Hege-Schöll (WCC)		GWCC 1992 (gold); WCC 1992 (8th)
1992–93	Janet Strayer	Josefine Einsle	Petra Tschetsch-Hiltensberger	Karin Fischer	Elisabeth Ländle		GWCC 1993 (gold); WCC 1993 (silver)
1993–94	Josefine Einsle	Petra Tschetsch-Hiltensberger	Elisabeth Ländle	Karin Fischer	Michaela Greif		ECC 1993 (6th)
1993–94	Josefine Einsle	Michaela Greif	Petra Tschetsch-Hiltensberger	Sabine Weber	Karin Fischer		GWCC 1994 (gold)
1999–00	Petra Tschetsch	Daniela Jentsch	Karin Fischer	Gesa Angrick	Elisabeth Ländle	Keith Wendorf	WCC 2000 (6th)
2000–01	Petra Tschetsch-Hiltensberger	Josefine Heinzle	Karin Fischer	Gesa Angrick	Elisabeth Ländle		GWCC 2001 (silver)
2004–05	Daniela Jentsch	Lisa Hammer	Sina Frey	Marika Trettin	Petra Tschetsch	Dick Henderson	ECC 2004 (9th)
2009–10	Petra Tschetsch	Gesa Angrick	Gerrit Mueller	Marion Klotz			
2010–11	Daniela Jentsch	Petra Tschetsch	Marika Trettin	Gesa Angrick			

=== Mixed ===
Season	Skip	Third	Second	Lead	Coach	Events
2013	Andy Kapp	Petra Tschetsch	Holger Höhne	Pia-Lisa Schöll		EMxCC 2013 (gold)
2015	Andy Kapp	Petra Tschetsch	Holger Höhne	Pia-Lisa Schöll	Elmar Hiltensberger	WMxCC 2015 (5th)
2016	Andy Kapp	Petra Tschetsch	Holger Höhne	Pia-Lisa Schöll		WMxCC 2016 (5th)
