= Tara Brown (curler) =

Scottish curler

- Curler ♀

Curling career
- Member Association: Scotland
- World Championship: 1 (1990)
- Other appearances: World Junior Championship: 1 (1988)
Medal record
Curling
World Championships
Silver medal – second place	1990 Västerås
Scottish Women's Championship
Gold medal – first place	1990

Tara Brown is a Scottish curler.

She is a 1990 World silver medallist.

== Teams ==
Season	Skip	Third	Second	Lead	!Events
1987–88	Carolyn Hutchison	Rhona Howie	Joan Robertson	Tara Brown	SJCC 1988 (gold); WJCC 1988 (4th)
1989–90	Carolyn Hutchison	Claire Milne	Mairi Milne	Tara Brown	SWCC 1990 (gold); WCC 1990 (silver)
