= Michaela Greif =

German curler

Michaela Greif Reilly
- Curler ♀

Team
- Curling club: CC Füssen, Füssen

Curling career
- Member Association: Germany
- World Championship: 1 (1994)
- European Championship: 1 (1993)
- Other appearances: World Junior Championships: 1 (1989)
Medal record
Curling
World Championships
| Bronze medal – third place | 1994 Oberstdorf |
German Women's Championship
| Gold medal – first place | 1994 |

Michaela Greif is a former German curler.

She is a 1994 World women's bronze medallist.

== Teams ==
| Season | Skip | Third | Second | Lead | Alternate | Events |
|---|---|---|---|---|---|---|
| 1988–89 | Simone Vogel | Christina Haller | Heike Wieländer | Sabine Belkofer | Michaela Greif | WJCC 1989 (7th) |
| 1993–94 | Josefine Einsle | Petra Tschetsch-Hiltensberger | Elisabeth Ländle | Karin Fischer | Michaela Greif | ECC 1993 (6th) |
| 1993–94 | Josefine Einsle | Michaela Greif | Petra Tschetsch-Hiltensberger | Sabine Weber | Karin Fischer | GWCC 1994 (gold) |
| 1993–94 | Josefine Einsle | Michaela Greif | Karin Fischer | Elisabeth Ländle | Sabine Weber | WCC 1994 (bronze) |
