= 2022 Scottish Curling Championships =

- Host city: Dumfries, Scotland
- Arena: Dumfries Ice Bowl
- Dates: February 21–27
- Men's winner: Team Paterson
- Curling club: Stirling CC, Stirling
- Skip: Ross Paterson
- Third: Kyle Waddell
- Second: Duncan Menzies
- Lead: Craig Waddell
- Coach: Tom Brewster
- Finalist: Ross Whyte
- Women's winner: Team Morrison
- Curling club: Curl Aberdeen, Aberdeen
- Skip: Rebecca Morrison
- Third: Gina Aitken
- Second: Sophie Sinclair
- Lead: Sophie Jackson
- Coach: Nancy Smith
- Finalist: Fay Henderson

The 2022 Scottish Men's and Women's Curling Championships were held from February 21 to 27 at the Dumfries Ice Bowl in Dumfries, Scotland. Both the men's and women's events were played in a double round robin which qualified four teams for a page playoff.

Because of the 2022 Winter Olympics, the men's Team Bruce Mouat and the women's Team Eve Muirhead had to withdraw from the event due to a scheduling conflict with the Games.

== Men ==
=== Teams ===
The teams are listed as follows:

Skip	Third	Second	Lead	Alternate	Locale
Cameron Bryce	Callum Kinnear	Mark Taylor	Robin McCall	Luke Carson	Kelso
James Craik	Angus Bryce	Scott Hyslop	Niall Ryder	Jack Carrick	Forfar
Ross Paterson	Kyle Waddell	Duncan Menzies	Craig Waddell		Stirling
Jack Strawhorn	Hamish Gallacher	Kaleb Johnston	Struan Carson	Scott Andrews	Dumfries
Mark Watt	Gregor Cannon	Blair Haswell	Gavin Barr		Perth
Ross Whyte	Robin Brydone	Duncan McFadzean	Euan Kyle	Greg Drummond	Dumfries

=== Round-robin standings ===
Final round-robin standings

Key
Teams to Playoffs

Skip	W	L	PF	PA	EW	EL	BE	SE
Ross Whyte	8	2	74	52	39	37	6	8
Ross Paterson	8	2	78	51	49	33	7	17
James Craik	6	4	74	58	46	39	10	12
Mark Watt	4	6	54	77	34	47	8	6
Jack Strawhorn	2	8	55	81	39	46	3	4
Cameron Bryce	2	8	55	71	36	41	3	8

=== Round-robin results ===
All draws are listed in Greenwich Mean Time (UTC±00:00).

==== Draw 1 ====
Monday, February 21, 8:00 am

Sheet A	1	2	3	4	5	6	7	8	9	10	Final
Jack Strawhorn	1	0	0	0	1	0	1	X	X	X	3
Cameron Bryce	0	3	1	3	0	2	0	X	X	X	9

Sheet B	1	2	3	4	5	6	7	8	9	10	Final
Ross Whyte	0	2	0	0	0	2	0	1	0	2	7
Mark Watt	0	0	1	1	0	0	1	0	3	0	6

Sheet D	1	2	3	4	5	6	7	8	9	10	Final
James Craik	1	0	0	2	1	0	1	0	1	0	6
Ross Paterson	0	1	1	0	0	3	0	1	0	1	7

==== Draw 2 ====
Monday, February 21, 4:00 pm

Sheet B	1	2	3	4	5	6	7	8	9	10	Final
Jack Strawhorn	2	0	3	0	1	0	1	0	2	1	10
Ross Paterson	0	2	0	2	0	1	0	2	0	0	7

Sheet C	1	2	3	4	5	6	7	8	9	10	Final
James Craik	0	0	0	1	2	0	2	0	2	X	7
Ross Whyte	0	1	0	0	0	1	0	1	0	X	3

Sheet D	1	2	3	4	5	6	7	8	9	10	11	Final
Mark Watt	4	0	0	0	0	1	0	0	1	0	1	7
Cameron Bryce	0	1	0	2	1	0	0	1	0	1	0	6

==== Draw 3 ====
Tuesday, February 22, 8:00 am

Sheet A	1	2	3	4	5	6	7	8	9	10	Final
Ross Whyte	1	0	2	0	2	1	0	2	X	X	8
Jack Strawhorn	0	1	0	1	0	0	1	0	X	X	3

Sheet B	1	2	3	4	5	6	7	8	9	10	Final
Mark Watt	0	1	2	0	1	0	2	2	0	0	8
James Craik	2	0	0	1	0	3	0	0	2	2	10

Sheet C	1	2	3	4	5	6	7	8	9	10	Final
Cameron Bryce	0	0	0	0	2	0	0	0	X	X	2
Ross Paterson	2	1	1	0	0	0	1	2	X	X	7

==== Draw 4 ====
Tuesday, February 22, 4:00 pm

Sheet A	1	2	3	4	5	6	7	8	9	10	Final
Mark Watt	0	1	0	0	1	0	0	0	X	X	2
Ross Paterson	0	0	2	1	0	3	1	3	X	X	10

Sheet C	1	2	3	4	5	6	7	8	9	10	Final
Jack Strawhorn	0	3	0	0	2	0	0	2	0	0	7
James Craik	1	0	0	2	0	0	3	0	2	2	10

Sheet D	1	2	3	4	5	6	7	8	9	10	Final
Cameron Bryce	1	0	2	0	2	0	0	0	1	1	7
Ross Whyte	0	2	0	4	0	0	2	0	0	0	8

==== Draw 5 ====
Wednesday, February 23, 8:00 am

Sheet A	1	2	3	4	5	6	7	8	9	10	11	Final
Cameron Bryce	0	0	3	0	1	0	1	1	0	3	0	9
James Craik	1	2	0	1	0	3	0	0	2	0	1	10

Sheet B	1	2	3	4	5	6	7	8	9	10	Final
Ross Paterson	1	0	2	1	0	0	2	0	2	0	8
Ross Whyte	0	4	0	0	1	0	0	4	0	1	10

Sheet D	1	2	3	4	5	6	7	8	9	10	11	Final
Jack Strawhorn	2	0	2	0	0	1	0	1	0	2	0	8
Mark Watt	0	1	0	1	0	0	3	0	3	0	1	9

==== Draw 6 ====
Wednesday, February 23, 4:00 pm

Sheet A	1	2	3	4	5	6	7	8	9	10	Final
Mark Watt	0	1	0	0	0	2	0	0	X	X	3
Ross Whyte	1	0	2	0	1	0	3	3	X	X	10

Sheet B	1	2	3	4	5	6	7	8	9	10	Final
Cameron Bryce	2	0	2	0	0	1	0	1	0	2	8
Jack Strawhorn	0	1	0	0	1	0	2	0	1	0	5

Sheet C	1	2	3	4	5	6	7	8	9	10	Final
Ross Paterson	2	0	0	1	0	2	1	0	0	1	7
James Craik	0	0	3	0	1	0	0	1	0	0	5

==== Draw 7 ====
Thursday, February 24, 8:00 am

Sheet A	1	2	3	4	5	6	7	8	9	10	Final
Ross Paterson	1	0	1	0	3	1	1	0	3	X	10
Jack Strawhorn	0	2	0	1	0	0	0	2	0	X	5

Sheet C	1	2	3	4	5	6	7	8	9	10	Final
Cameron Bryce	0	1	0	1	0	0	1	0	0	X	3
Mark Watt	1	0	0	0	0	2	0	1	2	X	6

Sheet D	1	2	3	4	5	6	7	8	9	10	11	Final
Ross Whyte	0	0	1	0	2	0	0	2	0	0	1	6
James Craik	0	2	0	1	0	1	0	0	0	1	0	5

==== Draw 8 ====
Thursday, February 24, 4:00 pm

Sheet A	1	2	3	4	5	6	7	8	9	10	Final
James Craik	0	3	0	1	0	0	1	0	1	2	8
Mark Watt	1	0	1	0	1	0	0	0	0	0	3

Sheet B	1	2	3	4	5	6	7	8	9	10	Final
Jack Strawhorn	0	1	0	1	1	0	1	0	X	X	4
Ross Whyte	3	0	2	0	0	2	0	1	X	X	8

Sheet D	1	2	3	4	5	6	7	8	9	10	Final
Ross Paterson	0	0	1	0	2	0	2	1	0	0	6
Cameron Bryce	0	0	0	1	0	1	0	0	2	1	5

==== Draw 9 ====
Friday, February 25, 8:00 am

Sheet B	1	2	3	4	5	6	7	8	9	10	Final
Ross Paterson	1	1	0	0	2	3	1	2	X	X	10
Mark Watt	0	0	0	2	0	0	0	0	X	X	2

Sheet C	1	2	3	4	5	6	7	8	9	10	Final
Ross Whyte	0	4	0	5	0	1	X	X	X	X	10
Cameron Bryce	0	0	1	0	2	0	X	X	X	X	3

Sheet D	1	2	3	4	5	6	7	8	9	10	11	Final
James Craik	1	0	0	1	0	0	0	1	0	1	0	4
Jack Strawhorn	0	1	2	0	1	0	0	0	0	0	1	5

==== Draw 10 ====
Friday, February 25, 4:00 pm

Sheet A	1	2	3	4	5	6	7	8	9	10	Final
Ross Whyte	0	0	1	0	0	1	0	1	1	0	4
Ross Paterson	0	0	0	2	1	0	2	0	0	1	6

Sheet B	1	2	3	4	5	6	7	8	9	10	Final
James Craik	0	0	1	0	3	3	1	1	X	X	9
Cameron Bryce	2	0	0	1	0	0	0	0	X	X	3

Sheet C	1	2	3	4	5	6	7	8	9	10	Final
Mark Watt	0	2	0	0	0	3	1	0	2	X	8
Jack Strawhorn	1	0	1	1	0	0	0	2	0	X	5

=== Playoffs ===
Page playoff system
1	Ross Whyte	7
2	Ross Paterson	4

Semifinal
2	Ross Paterson	7
3	James Craik	2

Final
1	Ross Whyte	5
2	Ross Paterson	6

==== 1 vs. 2 ====
Saturday, February 26, 12:00 pm

Team	1	2	3	4	5	6	7	8	9	10	Final
Ross Whyte	0	0	2	0	2	0	3	0	X	X	7
Ross Paterson	2	0	0	1	0	1	0	0	X	X	4

==== Semifinal ====
Saturday, February 26, 7:00 pm

Sheet D	1	2	3	4	5	6	7	8	9	10	Final
Ross Paterson	0	2	2	0	0	2	1	0	X	X	7
James Craik	0	0	0	1	0	0	0	1	X	X	2

==== Final ====
Sunday, February 27, 11:00 am

Team	1	2	3	4	5	6	7	8	9	10	Final
Ross Whyte	1	0	1	0	0	1	0	2	0	X	5
Ross Paterson	0	1	0	0	1	0	2	0	2	X	6

2022 Scottish Men's Curling Championship
(Scotland)
Ross Paterson
2nd Scottish Championship title

== Women ==
=== Teams ===
The teams are listed as follows:

Skip	Third	Second	Lead	Alternate	Locale
Lucy Blair	Alex Mackintosh	Jennifer Marshall	Hannah Farries		Greenacres
Jenni Cannon	Leeanne McKenzie	Kirsty Barr	Annabel Skuse	Layla Al-Saffar	Stranraer
Beth Farmer	Kristin Bousie	Emma Barr	Laura Watt	Robyn Munro	Kinross
Fay Henderson	Katie McMillan	Lisa Davie	Holly Wilkie-Milne		Dumfries
Amy MacDonald	Eilidh Yeats	Robyn Mitchell	Susie Smith	Nicola Joiner	Elgin
Rebecca Morrison	Gina Aitken	Sophie Sinclair	Sophie Jackson		Aberdeen

=== Round-robin standings ===
Final round-robin standings

Key
Teams to Playoffs

Skip	W	L	PF	PA	EW	EL	BE	SE
Fay Henderson	7	2	80	43	41	26	0	16
Rebecca Morrison	7	2	75	52	42	32	1	16
Amy MacDonald	5	4	64	55	40	38	5	10
Beth Farmer	4	5	56	69	31	43	1	8
Lucy Blair	3	6	53	68	33	34	6	13
Jenni Cannon	1	8	33	74	26	40	5	9

=== Round-robin results ===
All draws are listed in Greenwich Mean Time (UTC±00:00).

==== Draw 1 ====
Monday, February 21, 12:00 pm

Sheet A	1	2	3	4	5	6	7	8	9	10	Final
Rebecca Morrison	2	6	1	0	0	0	1	X	X	X	10
Lucy Blair	0	0	0	1	2	0	0	X	X	X	3

Sheet B	1	2	3	4	5	6	7	8	9	10	Final
Jenni Cannon	0	1	0	2	1	0	2	2	0	0	8
Beth Farmer	2	0	2	0	0	2	0	0	2	2	10

Sheet C	1	2	3	4	5	6	7	8	9	10	Final
Amy MacDonald	0	2	4	0	0	0	1	0	2	X	9
Fay Henderson	1	0	0	1	1	0	0	2	0	X	5

==== Draw 2 ====
Monday, February 21, 8:00 pm

Sheet B	1	2	3	4	5	6	7	8	9	10	Final
Lucy Blair	1	0	1	0	1	0	2	1	2	X	8
Amy MacDonald	0	1	0	2	0	2	0	0	0	X	5

Sheet C	1	2	3	4	5	6	7	8	9	10	Final
Rebecca Morrison	2	0	1	2	1	0	1	1	X	X	8
Beth Farmer	0	1	0	0	0	1	0	0	X	X	2

Sheet D	1	2	3	4	5	6	7	8	9	10	Final
Jenni Cannon	0	0	0	0	0	1	0	X	X	X	1
Fay Henderson	0	1	1	2	0	0	4	X	X	X	8

==== Draw 3 ====
Tuesday, February 22, 12:00 pm

Sheet A	1	2	3	4	5	6	7	8	9	10	Final
Jenni Cannon	0	2	0	1	0	0	1	0	1	X	5
Amy MacDonald	2	0	1	0	2	1	0	1	0	X	7

Sheet B	1	2	3	4	5	6	7	8	9	10	Final
Fay Henderson	0	3	3	0	2	1	0	0	1	X	10
Rebecca Morrison	2	0	0	1	0	0	2	2	0	X	7

Sheet D	1	2	3	4	5	6	7	8	9	10	Final
Lucy Blair	0	0	0	0	1	1	0	X	X	X	2
Beth Farmer	0	3	1	4	0	0	2	X	X	X	10

==== Draw 4 ====
Tuesday, February 22, 8:00 pm

Sheet A	1	2	3	4	5	6	7	8	9	10	Final
Lucy Blair	0	1	0	1	0	2	0	X	X	X	4
Fay Henderson	2	0	1	0	2	0	5	X	X	X	10

Sheet C	1	2	3	4	5	6	7	8	9	10	Final
Beth Farmer	0	1	0	1	0	0	1	0	X	X	3
Amy MacDonald	0	0	1	0	3	3	0	2	X	X	9

Sheet D	1	2	3	4	5	6	7	8	9	10	Final
Rebecca Morrison	1	0	1	3	1	1	0	1	4	X	12
Jenni Cannon	0	2	0	0	0	0	2	0	0	X	4

==== Draw 5 ====
Wednesday, February 23, 12:00 pm

Sheet A	1	2	3	4	5	6	7	8	9	10	Final
Amy MacDonald	1	0	2	0	0	1	0	1	1	0	6
Rebecca Morrison	0	2	0	1	0	0	2	0	0	2	7

Sheet B	1	2	3	4	5	6	7	8	9	10	Final
Beth Farmer	1	0	1	0	0	2	0	0	X	X	4
Fay Henderson	0	2	0	1	3	0	4	5	X	X	15

Sheet C	1	2	3	4	5	6	7	8	9	10	Final
Lucy Blair	0	2	2	2	1	2	X	X	X	X	9
Jenni Cannon	0	0	0	0	0	0	X	X	X	X	0

==== Draw 6 ====
Wednesday, February 23, 8:00 pm

Sheet A	1	2	3	4	5	6	7	8	9	10	Final
Beth Farmer	0	0	0	0	0	2	0	0	0	X	2
Jenni Cannon	0	1	1	1	1	0	1	1	1	X	7

Sheet B	1	2	3	4	5	6	7	8	9	10	Final
Lucy Blair	2	0	1	2	0	0	0	0	0	2	7
Rebecca Morrison	0	3	0	0	2	1	0	1	1	0	8

Sheet D	1	2	3	4	5	6	7	8	9	10	Final
Fay Henderson	0	1	0	0	2	0	0	1	2	0	6
Amy MacDonald	1	0	0	4	0	1	1	0	0	1	8

==== Draw 7 ====
Thursday, February 24, 12:00 pm

Sheet A	1	2	3	4	5	6	7	8	9	10	Final
Amy MacDonald	1	0	0	1	0	2	0	0	2	0	6
Lucy Blair	0	2	1	0	1	0	0	1	0	5	10

Sheet C	1	2	3	4	5	6	7	8	9	10	Final
Fay Henderson	0	2	0	3	1	0	2	X	X	X	8
Jenni Cannon	1	0	0	0	0	0	0	X	X	X	1

Sheet D	1	2	3	4	5	6	7	8	9	10	Final
Beth Farmer	0	2	0	0	1	0	2	0	1	X	6
Rebecca Morrison	2	0	2	1	0	2	0	1	0	X	8

==== Draw 8 ====
Thursday, February 24, 8:00 pm

Sheet A	1	2	3	4	5	6	7	8	9	10	Final
Rebecca Morrison	0	2	0	0	2	0	0	1	0	X	5
Fay Henderson	1	0	2	2	0	1	3	0	2	X	11

Sheet B	1	2	3	4	5	6	7	8	9	10	Final
Amy MacDonald	2	0	1	0	1	0	2	0	2	X	8
Jenni Cannon	0	1	0	1	0	1	0	1	0	X	4

Sheet C	1	2	3	4	5	6	7	8	9	10	Final
Beth Farmer	0	2	0	2	2	0	3	0	3	X	12
Lucy Blair	1	0	1	0	0	1	0	3	0	X	6

==== Draw 9 ====
Friday, February 25, 12:00 pm

Sheet B	1	2	3	4	5	6	7	8	9	10	Final
Fay Henderson	1	0	0	2	1	0	0	0	2	1	7
Lucy Blair	0	0	3	0	0	0	0	1	0	0	4

Sheet C	1	2	3	4	5	6	7	8	9	10	Final
Jenni Cannon	0	0	0	2	1	0	X	X	X	X	3
Rebecca Morrison	2	2	4	0	0	2	X	X	X	X	10

Sheet D	1	2	3	4	5	6	7	8	9	10	Final
Amy MacDonald	0	0	0	2	1	0	1	1	1	0	6
Beth Farmer	2	0	3	0	0	1	0	0	0	1	7

==== Draw 10 ====
Friday, February 25, 8:00 pm

Sheet A	1	2	3	4	5	6	7	8	9	10	Final
Fay Henderson	0	3	0	4	1	0	1	0	X	X	9
Beth Farmer	1	0	1	0	0	2	0	1	X	X	5

Sheet B	1	2	3	4	5	6	7	8	9	10	Final
Rebecca Morrison	1	0	0	2	0	1	1	0	0	1	6
Amy MacDonald	0	1	2	0	1	0	0	0	1	0	5

Sheet D	1	2	3	4	5	6	7	8	9	10	Final
Jenni Cannon	0	0	0	0	0	0	X	X	X	X	0
Lucy Blair	0	0	0	3	1	1	X	X	X	X	5

=== Playoffs ===
Page playoff system
1	Rebecca Morrison	9
2	Fay Henderson	3

Semifinal
2	Fay Henderson	8
3	MacDonald	6

Final
1	Rebecca Morrison	8
2	Fay Henderson	4

==== 1 vs. 2 ====
Saturday, February 26, 12:00 pm

Sheet D	1	2	3	4	5	6	7	8	9	10	Final
Rebecca Morrison	0	1	3	0	0	0	2	1	2	X	9
Fay Henderson	2	0	0	1	0	0	0	0	0	X	3

==== Semifinal ====
Saturday, February 26, 7:00 pm

Team	1	2	3	4	5	6	7	8	9	10	Final
Fay Henderson	0	0	2	0	0	1	0	5	0	X	8
Amy MacDonald	1	0	0	0	1	0	1	0	3	X	6

==== Final ====
Sunday, February 27, 4:00 pm

Team	1	2	3	4	5	6	7	8	9	10	Final
Rebecca Morrison	1	0	4	0	0	0	0	0	1	2	8
Fay Henderson	0	2	0	1	0	0	1	0	0	0	4

2022 Scottish Women's Curling Championship
(Scotland)
Rebecca Morrison
1st Scottish Championship title
