= 1994 World Women's Curling Championship =

- Host city: Oberstdorf, Germany
- Arena: Eisstadion
- Dates: April 10–17, 1994
- Winner: Canada
- Curling club: Caledonian CC, Regina, Saskatchewan
- Skip: Sandra Peterson
- Third: Jan Betker
- Second: Joan McCusker
- Lead: Marcia Gudereit
- Alternate: Anita Ford
- Finalist: Scotland (Christine Cannon)

The 1994 World Women's Curling Championship was held at the Eisstadion in Oberstdorf, Germany from April 10–17, 1994.

== Teams ==
Canada	Denmark	Finland	Germany	Japan
Caledonian CC, Regina, Saskatchewan Skip: Sandra Peterson; Third: Jan Betker; Second: Joan McCusker; Lead: Marcia Gudereit; Alternate: Anita Ford	Tårnby CC Skip: Helena Blach Lavrsen; Third: Angelina Jensen; Second: Margit Pörtner; Lead: Helene Jensen; Alternate: Dorthe Holm	Hyvinkää CC Skip: Jaana Jokela; Third: Nina Pöllänen; Second: Terhi Aro; Lead: Laura Franssila; Alternate: Anne Eerikäinen	Füssen CC Skip: Josefine Einsle; Third: Michaela Greif; Second: Karin Fischer; Lead: Elisabeth Ländle; Alternate: Sabine Weber	Obihiro CC, Hokkaido Skip: Mayumi Seguchi; Third: Ayako Ishigaki; Second: Akemi Niwa; Lead: Chieko Horishimizu; Alternate: Mami Nishioka
Norway	Scotland	Sweden	Switzerland	United States
Oslo CC Skip: Ingvill Githmark; Third: Gøril Bye; Second: Ellen Kittelsen; Lead: Line Marie Bjerke; Alternate: Therese Bye	Wigtown CC, Stranraer Skip: Christine Cannon; Third: Claire Milne; Second: Mairi Herd; Lead: Janice Watt; Alternate: Sheila Harvey	Umeå CK Skip: Elisabet Johansson; Third: Katarina Nyberg; Second: Louise Marmont; Lead: Elisabeth Persson; Alternate: Helena Svensson	Lausanne-Olympique CC Skip: Angela Lutz; Third: Laurence Bidaud; Second: Laurence Morisetti; Lead: Sandrine Mercier; Alternate: Claude Orizet	Denver CC, Colorado Skip: Bev Behnke; Third: Dawna Bennett; Second: Susan Anschuetz; Lead: Pam Finch

== Round-robin standings ==
Key
Teams to playoffs
Teams to tiebreaker

Country	Skip	W	L
Canada	Sandra Peterson	8	1
Sweden	Elisabet Johansson	6	3
Scotland	Christine Cannon	6	3
Norway	Ingvill Githmark	5	4
Germany	Josefine Einsle	5	4
Finland	Jaana Jokela	4	5
Switzerland	Angela Lutz	4	5
United States	Bev Behnke	4	5
Denmark	Helena Blach Lavrsen	2	7
Japan	Mayumi Seguchi	1	8

== Round-robin results ==
=== Draw 1 ===
Sheet A	Final
Switzerland (Lutz)	2
Scotland (Cannon)	11

Sheet B	Final
Japan (Mayumi)	3
Germany (Einsle)	8

Sheet C	Final
Norway (Githmark)	6
Finland (Jokela)	4

Sheet D	Final
Denmark (Lavrsen)	2
Sweden (Johansson)	13

Sheet E	Final
Canada (Peterson)	9
United States (Behnke)	4

=== Draw 2 ===
Sheet A	Final
Norway (Githmark)	6
Japan (Mayumi)	4

Sheet B	Final
Sweden (Johansson)	5
Canada (Peterson)	10

Sheet C	Final
Germany (Einsle)	8
United States (Behnke)	4

Sheet D	Final
Scotland (Cannon)	8
Finland (Jokela)	2

Sheet E	Final
Switzerland (Lutz)	8
Denmark (Lavrsen)	5

=== Draw 3 ===
Sheet A	Final
Sweden (Johansson)	8
Germany (Einsle)	4

Sheet B	Final
Scotland (Cannon)	8
Denmark (Lavrsen)	4

Sheet C	Final
Switzerland (Lutz)	3
Canada (Peterson)	8

Sheet D	Final
Norway (Githmark)	3
United States (Behnke)	7

Sheet E	Final
Japan (Mayumi)	5
Finland (Jokela)	9

=== Draw 4 ===
Sheet A	Final
United States (Behnke)	6
Denmark (Lavrsen)	7

Sheet B	Final
Finland (Jokela)	10
Switzerland (Lutz)	8

Sheet C	Final
Sweden (Johansson)	5
Scotland (Cannon)	3

Sheet D	Final
Canada (Peterson)	9
Japan (Mayumi)	5

Sheet E	Final
Germany (Einsle)	6
Norway (Githmark)	8

=== Draw 5 ===
Sheet A	Final
Switzerland (Lutz)	8
Sweden (Johansson)	9

Sheet B	Final
Canada (Peterson)	13
Norway (Githmark)	2

Sheet C	Final
Denmark (Lavrsen)	8
Japan (Mayumi)	7

Sheet D	Final
Finland (Jokela)	9
Germany (Einsle)	7

Sheet E	Final
Scotland (Cannon)	10
United States (Behnke)	1

=== Draw 6 ===
Sheet A	Final
Germany (Einsle)	6
Scotland (Cannon)	5

Sheet B	Final
Japan (Mayumi)	6
Sweden (Johansson)	9

Sheet C	Final
United States (Behnke)	10
Finland (Jokela)	3

Sheet D	Final
Denmark (Lavrsen)	6
Canada (Peterson)	3

Sheet E	Final
Norway (Githmark)	4
Switzerland (Lutz)	6

=== Draw 7 ===
Sheet A	Final
Finland (Jokela)	6
Canada (Peterson)	8

Sheet B	Final
Norway (Githmark)	4
Scotland (Cannon)	14

Sheet C	Final
Switzerland (Lutz)	5
Japan (Mayumi)	4

Sheet D	Final
Sweden (Johansson)	4
United States (Behnke)	8

Sheet E	Final
Germany (Einsle)	5
Denmark (Lavrsen)	1

=== Draw 8 ===
Sheet A	Final
United States (Behnke)	9
Japan (Mayumi)	4

Sheet B	Final
Finland (Jokela)	9
Denmark (Lavrsen)	5

Sheet C	Final
Sweden (Johansson)	1
Norway (Githmark)	10

Sheet D	Final
Switzerland (Lutz)	3
Germany (Einsle)	7

Sheet E	Final
Scotland (Cannon)	3
Canada (Peterson)	10

=== Draw 9 ===
Sheet A	Final
Denmark (Lavrsen)	8
Norway (Githmark)	9

Sheet B	Final
Switzerland (Lutz)	5
United States (Behnke)	4

Sheet C	Final
Canada (Peterson)	6
Germany (Einsle)	5

Sheet D	Final
Japan (Mayumi)	4
Scotland (Cannon)	8

Sheet E	Final
Finland (Jokela)	7
Sweden (Johansson)	8

== Tiebreaker ==
Sheet A	Final
Norway (Githmark)	6
Germany (Einsle)	7

== Playoffs ==
=== Brackets ===
Semi-final
1	Canada	10
4	Germany	6
3	Scotland	10
2	Sweden	6

Final
1	Canada	5
3	Scotland	3

=== Final ===
Team	1	2	3	4	5	6	7	8	9	10	Final
Canada (Peterson)	1	0	0	1	0	0	2	1	0	X	5
Scotland (Cannon)	0	0	1	0	1	0	0	0	1	X	3
