= 2014 World Senior Curling Championships =

- Host city: Dumfries, Scotland
- Arena: Dumfries Ice Bowl
- Dates: April 23–30
- Men's winner: Canada
- Curling club: Capital WC, Fredericton
- Skip: Wayne Tallon
- Fourth: Mike Kennedy
- Second: Mike Flannery
- Lead: Wade Blanchard
- Alternate: Charles Kingston
- Finalist: Sweden (Connie Östlund)
- Women's winner: Scotland
- Skip: Christine Cannon
- Third: Margaret Richardson
- Second: Isobel Hannen
- Lead: Janet Lindsay
- Alternate: Margaret Robinson
- Finalist: Canada (Colleen Pinkney)

The 2014 World Senior Curling Championships were held from April 23 to 30 at the Dumfries Ice Bowl in Dumfries, Scotland. The event will be held in conjunction with the 2014 World Mixed Doubles Curling Championship.

== Men ==
=== Round-robin standings ===
Final round-robin standings

Key
Teams to Playoffs
Teams to Qualification Game

Group A	Skip	W	L
Canada	Wayne Tallon	8	0
Australia	Hugh Millikin	7	1
Norway	Tormod Andreassen	6	2
Germany	Rainer Schöpp	5	3
Latvia	Pēteris Šveisbergs	4	4
Slovakia	Peter Mocek	2	6
Japan	Masayasu Sato	2	6
France	Eric Richert	1	7
Poland	Andrzej Janowski	1	7

Group B	Skip	W	L
England	John Sharp	6	1
United States	Jeff Wright	6	1
Scotland	Keith Prentice	5	2
Finland	Olli Rissanen	4	3
Czech Republic	Petr Kovač	3	4
Hungary	Andras Rókusfalvy	2	5
Russia	Sergey Korolenko	1	6
New Zealand	Peter Becker	1	6

Group C	Skip	W	L
Sweden	Connie Östlund	6	1
Ireland	John Jo Kenny	6	1
Netherlands	Gustaaf van Imhoff	5	2
Denmark	Bernd Hausted	4	3
Wales	Chris Wells	3	4
Switzerland	Jürg Gnägi	3	4
Italy	Danilo Capriolo	1	6
Austria	Ronald Niederhauser	0	7

=== Playoffs ===
Quarterfinals
A1	Canada	6
B3	Scotland	5
C2	Ireland	4
B2	United States	5
A2	Australia	7
B1	England	4
A3	Norway	6
C1	Sweden	7

Semifinals
A1	Canada	5
B2	United States	4
A2	Australia	3
C1	Sweden	5

Gold-medal game
A1	Canada	7
C1	Sweden	2

Bronze-medal game
B2	United States	3
A2	Australia	6

==== Bronze-medal game ====
Wednesday, April 30, 12:30

Sheet D	1	2	3	4	5	6	7	8	Final
United States (Wright)	0	1	0	2	0	0	0	X	3
Australia (Millikin) 🔨	2	0	1	0	0	3	0	X	6

==== Gold-medal game ====
Wednesday, April 30, 12:30

Sheet E	1	2	3	4	5	6	7	8	Final
Canada (Tallon) 🔨	2	0	2	1	2	0	X	X	7
Sweden (Östlund)	0	1	0	0	0	1	X	X	2

== Women ==
=== Round-robin standings ===
Final round-robin standings

Key
Teams to Playoffs

Group A	Skip	W	L
United States	Margie Smith	7	0
Sweden	Ingrid Meldahl	5	2
Slovakia	Margita Matuskovicova	4	3
New Zealand	Wendy Becker	3	4
Czech Republic	Miroslava Vareckova	3	4
England	Jean Robinson	3	4
Austria	Veronika Huber	2	5
Japan	Shizuko Funaki	1	6

Group B	Skip	W	L
Canada	Colleen Pinkney	6	0
Scotland	Christine Cannon	5	1
Switzerland	Susan Limena	4	2
Australia	Sandy Gagnon	3	3
Finland	Kirsti Kauste	2	4
Italy	Fiona Grace Simpson	1	5
Russia	Ludmila Murova	0	6

=== Playoffs ===
Quarterfinals
B2	Scotland	8
A3	Slovakia	4
A2	Sweden	8
B3	Switzerland	2

Semifinals
A1	United States	4
B2	Scotland	5
B1	Canada	6
A2	Sweden	5

Final
B2	Scotland	6
B1	Canada	5

Bronze-medal game
A1	United States	8
A2	Sweden	3

==== Bronze-medal game ====
Wednesday, April 30, 12:30

Sheet C	1	2	3	4	5	6	7	8	Final
United States (Smith) 🔨	2	0	2	1	0	2	1	X	8
Sweden (Meldahl)	0	1	0	0	2	0	0	X	3

==== Gold-medal game ====
Wednesday, April 30, 12:30

Sheet B	1	2	3	4	5	6	7	8	Final
Scotland (Cannon)	0	0	0	1	1	0	2	2	6
Canada (Pinkney) 🔨	0	2	1	0	0	2	0	0	5
