= 1997 Saskatchewan Scott Tournament of Hearts =

The 1997 Saskatchewan Scott Tournament of Hearts women's provincial curling championship, was held January 22–26 at the Swift Current Arena in Swift Current, Saskatchewan. The winning team of Sandra Schmirler, represented Saskatchewan at the 1997 Scott Tournament of Hearts in Vancouver, British Columbia, where the team finished round robin with a 9-2 record, and would go on to defeat Ontario's Alison Goring, in both the 1-2 Game and the Final, to win the Canadian Championship.

== Teams ==
- Renelle Bryden
- Pam Haupstein
- Kim Hodson
- Sherry Linton
- Myrna Nielson
- Sherry Scheirich
- Sandra Schmirler
- Anita Silvernagle

== Standings ==
Skip	W	L
Sandra Schmirler	6	1
Anita Silvernagle	5	2
Sherry Linton	5	2
Kim Hodson	4	3
Sherry Scheirich	3	4
Renelle Bryden	3	4
Pam Haupstein	1	6
Myrna Nielson	1	6

== Results ==
=== Draw 1 ===
January 22, 7:30 PM CT

Sheet A	1	2	3	4	5	6	7	8	9	10	Final
Scheirich	1	0	1	0	0	1	0	1	0	0	4
Linton	0	1	0	2	0	0	2	0	0	1	6

Sheet B	1	2	3	4	5	6	7	8	9	10	Final
Silvernagle	3	2	2	0	1	1	2	X	X	X	11
Haupstein	0	0	0	1	0	0	0	X	X	X	1

Sheet C	1	2	3	4	5	6	7	8	9	10	11	Final
Hodson	1	0	1	0	1	0	0	2	0	1	0	6
Schmirler	0	2	0	1	0	1	1	0	1	0	2	8

Sheet D	1	2	3	4	5	6	7	8	9	10	Final
Bryden	3	0	3	0	0	0	1	0	0	1	8
Nielson	0	2	0	0	0	2	0	1	0	0	5

=== Draw 2 ===
January 23, 10:00 AM CT

Sheet A	1	2	3	4	5	6	7	8	9	10	Final
Silvernagle	0	1	0	1	0	0	0	1	0	2	5
Bryden	1	0	0	0	2	0	0	0	1	0	4

Sheet B	1	2	3	4	5	6	7	8	9	10	Final
Hodson	0	1	0	1	0	2	0	3	X	X	7
Nielson	0	0	0	0	0	0	1	0	X	X	1

Sheet C	1	2	3	4	5	6	7	8	9	10	Final
Scheirich	2	0	1	0	1	0	2	0	1	X	7
Haupstein	0	1	0	1	0	2	0	0	0	X	4

Sheet D	1	2	3	4	5	6	7	8	9	10	Final
Linton	2	0	1	0	1	0	0	1	0	X	5
Schmirler	0	3	0	1	0	1	1	0	3	X	9

=== Draw 3 ===
January 23, 2:30 PM CT

Sheet A	1	2	3	4	5	6	7	8	9	10	Final
Haupstein	0	1	0	0	2	0	1	0	0	0	4
Linton	0	0	1	3	0	2	0	1	1	2	10

Sheet B	1	2	3	4	5	6	7	8	9	10	Final
Schmirler	2	1	1	2	0	2	X	X	X	X	8
Silvernagle	0	0	0	0	1	0	X	X	X	X	1

Sheet C	1	2	3	4	5	6	7	8	9	10	Final
Bryden	1	0	0	0	0	0	X	X	X	X	1
Hodson	0	2	1	4	2	2	X	X	X	X	11

Sheet D	1	2	3	4	5	6	7	8	9	10	Final
Nielson	1	0	0	2	0	1	0	0	X	X	4
Scheirich	0	3	2	0	3	0	0	3	X	X	11

=== Draw 4 ===
January 24, 10:00 AM CT

Sheet A	1	2	3	4	5	6	7	8	9	10	Final
Hodson	1	2	0	1	0	0	0	1	0	0	5
Scheirich	0	0	2	0	2	1	1	0	1	1	8

Sheet B	1	2	3	4	5	6	7	8	9	10	Final
Bryden	0	1	0	0	1	0	0	0	0	0	2
Linton	0	0	0	1	0	0	0	2	0	1	4

Sheet C	1	2	3	4	5	6	7	8	9	10	Final
Nielson	0	1	0	0	2	1	0	1	1	0	6
Silvernagle	1	0	1	2	0	0	2	0	0	1	7

Sheet D	1	2	3	4	5	6	7	8	9	10	Final
Schmirler	1	3	2	0	0	5	X	X	X	X	11
Haupstein	0	0	0	2	0	0	X	X	X	X	2

=== Draw 5 ===
January 24, 2:30 PM CT

Sheet A	1	2	3	4	5	6	7	8	9	10	Final
Linton	2	0	1	0	4	4	X	X	X	X	11
Nielson	0	0	0	1	0	0	X	X	X	X	1

Sheet B	1	2	3	4	5	6	7	8	9	10	Final
Scheirich	0	1	0	0	0	0	0	0	1	X	2
Schmirler	0	0	2	0	0	0	1	3	0	X	6

Sheet C	1	2	3	4	5	6	7	8	9	10	Final
Haupstein	0	0	1	0	0	0	1	0	1	X	3
Bryden	2	0	0	1	1	0	0	1	0	X	5

Sheet D	1	2	3	4	5	6	7	8	9	10	Final
Silvernagle	0	0	0	1	0	0	0	1	0	X	2
Hodson	0	1	1	0	0	0	1	0	3	X	6

=== Draw 6 ===
January 24, 7:30 PM CT

Sheet A	1	2	3	4	5	6	7	8	9	10	Final
Haupstein	1	0	1	0	0	0	0	0	X	X	2
Hodson	0	2	0	1	0	1	1	3	X	X	8

Sheet B	1	2	3	4	5	6	7	8	9	10	Final
Linton	3	0	0	0	0	2	0	1	0	0	6
Silvernagle	0	2	1	2	0	0	0	0	0	2	7

Sheet C	1	2	3	4	5	6	7	8	9	10	Final
Schmirler	1	0	0	0	2	0	1	0	0	0	4
Nielson	0	0	1	1	0	1	0	0	1	1	5

Sheet D	1	2	3	4	5	6	7	8	9	10	Final
Scheirich	0	1	0	1	0	0	1	0	0	X	3
Bryden	1	0	2	0	2	0	0	1	1	X	7

=== Draw 7 ===
January 27, 7:00 PM CT

Sheet A	1	2	3	4	5	6	7	8	9	10	Final
Bryden	1	0	0	0	1	0	0	X	X	X	2
Schmirler	0	4	0	1	0	3	1	X	X	X	9

Sheet B	1	2	3	4	5	6	7	8	9	10	Final
Nielson	1	0	1	0	0	0	0	X	X	X	2
Haupstein	0	3	0	2	2	2	2	X	X	X	11

Sheet C	1	2	3	4	5	6	7	8	9	10	Final
Silvernagle	2	0	1	0	1	0	2	1	0	X	7
Scheirich	0	1	0	2	0	2	0	0	1	X	6

Sheet D	1	2	3	4	5	6	7	8	9	10	Final
Hodson	1	0	0	1	0	1	0	0	0	X	3
Linton	0	0	2	0	2	0	0	1	1	X	6

== Playoffs ==
Semifinals			Finals
1	Sandra Schmirler	7
4	Kim Hodson	5	1	Sandra Schmirler	7
2	Anita Silvernagle	5	3	Sherry Linton	5
3	Sherry Linton	7

=== Semifinal ===
January 25, 7:30 PM CT

Sheet A	1	2	3	4	5	6	7	8	9	10	Final
Hodson	1	0	0	1	0	1	0	0	2	0	5
Schmirler	0	1	1	0	2	0	1	1	0	1	7

Sheet B	1	2	3	4	5	6	7	8	9	10	Final
Silvernagle	1	0	1	0	1	0	2	0	0	X	5
Linton	0	1	0	2	0	2	0	2	0	X	7

=== Final ===
January 29, 5:00 PM CT

Sheet A	1	2	3	4	5	6	7	8	9	10	Final
Linton	0	1	0	0	0	1	0	2	1	0	5
Schmirler	1	0	1	1	0	0	1	0	0	3	7
