= Elisabeth Ländle =

German curler

- Curler ♀

Team
- Curling club: CC Füssen, Füssen

Curling career
- Member Association: Germany
- World Championship: 4 (1992, 1993, 1994, 2000)
- European Championship: 1 (1993)
- Other appearances: World Junior Championships: 1 (1990)
Medal record
Curling
World Championships
Silver medal – second place	1993 Geneva
Bronze medal – third place	1994 Oberstdorf
German Women's Championship
Gold medal – first place	1992
Gold medal – first place	1993
Silver medal – second place	2001

Elisabeth Ländle is a former German curler.

She is a 1993 World women's silver and a 1994 World women's bronze medallist.

== Teams ==
Season	Skip	Third	Second	Lead	Alternate	Coach	Events
1989–90	Karoline Schlachter (fourth)	Monica Imminger (skip)	Elisabeth Ländle	Alexandra Theurer	Ulanou Klotz		WJCC 1990 (10th)
1991–92	Josefine Einsle	Petra Tschetsch-Hiltensberger	Elisabeth Ländle	Karin Fischer	Almut Hege-Schöll (WCC)		GWCC 1992 (gold); WCC 1992 (8th)
1992–93	Janet Strayer	Josefine Einsle	Petra Tschetsch-Hiltensberger	Karin Fischer	Elisabeth Ländle		GWCC 1993 (gold); WCC 1993 (silver)
1993–94	Josefine Einsle	Petra Tschetsch-Hiltensberger	Elisabeth Ländle	Karin Fischer	Michaela Greif		ECC 1993 (6th)
1993–94	Josefine Einsle	Michaela Greif	Karin Fischer	Elisabeth Ländle	Sabine Weber		WCC 1994 (bronze)
1999–00	Petra Tschetsch	Daniela Jentsch	Karin Fischer	Gesa Angrick	Elisabeth Ländle	Keith Wendorf	WCC 2000 (6th)
2000–01	Petra Tschetsch	Josefine Heinzle	Karin Fischer	Gesa Angrick	Elisabeth Ländle		GWCC 2001 (silver)
