= Carolyn Hutchison =

Scottish curler

- Curler ♀

Team
- Curling club: Greenacres CC, Renfrewshire; Lockerbie CC, Lockerbie

Curling career
- Member Association: Scotland
- World Championship: 2 (1990, 1997)
- Other appearances: World Junior Championship: 2 (1988, 1989)
Medal record
Curling
World Championships
Silver medal – second place	1990 Västerås
World Junior Championships
Silver medal – second place	1989 Markham
Scottish Women's Championship
Gold medal – first place	1990
Gold medal – first place	1997

Carolyn Hutchison (born c. 1968) is a Scottish curler.

She is a 1990 World silver medallist and 1989 WJCC Bronze medallist.

== Teams ==
Season	Skip	Third	Second	Lead	Alternate	Events
1987–88	Carolyn Hutchison	Rhona Howie	Joan Robertson	Tara Brown		SJCC 1988 (gold); WJCC 1988 (4th)
1988–89	Carolyn Hutchison	Julie Hepburn	Katie Loudon	Julia Halliday		SJCC 1989 (gold); WJCC 1989 (bronze)
1989–90	Carolyn Hutchison	Claire Milne	Mairi Milne	Tara Brown		SWCC 1990 (gold); WCC 1990 (silver)
1996–97	Carolyn Hutchison	Heather Crockett	Jan Byers	Lucy Levack	Gillian Barr (WCC)	SWCC 1997 (gold); WCC 1997 (8th)
