= Rhiann Macleod =

Scottish curler

- Curler
- Born: 22 April 1990 (age 36)

Team
- Curling club: Curl Aberdeen; Aberdeen, SCO
- Skip: Kerry Barr
- Third: Rachael Simms
- Second: Rhiann Macleod
- Lead: Barbara McPake
- Alternate: Hannah Fleming

Curling career
- World Championship: 2 (2011, 2014)
- European Championship: 0
Medal record
World Junior Curling Championships
| Gold medal – first place | 2011 Perth |
World Mixed Curling Championship
| Gold medal – first place | 2017 Champéry |

Rhiann Macleod (born 22 April 1990) is a Scottish curler from Aberdeen and originally from Blair Atholl. She is a former World Junior champion.

== Career ==
As a junior curler, Macleod played lead for Eve Muirhead's rink at the 2011 World Junior Curling Championships. The team won a gold medal at the event, defeating Canada's Trish Paulsen in the final for the championship. That same year, the team re-organized and represented Scotland at the 2011 Capital One World Women's Curling Championship. Anna Sloan would skip the team, with Muirhead sitting out as the team's alternate and Macleod remained at lead. At the Worlds, the team finished with a 4–7 record in 9th place. Macleod would herself miss three games.

Following the 2010–11 season, Macleod joined the Kerry Barr rink, and has remained with the team ever since. The team won the 2014 Scottish Women's Curling Championship, and will represent Scotland at the 2014 Ford World Women's Curling Championship.
