= 2016 World Senior Curling Championships =

- Host city: Karlstad, Sweden
- Arena: Karlstad Curling Arena
- Dates: 16–23 April
- Men's winner: Sweden
- Skip: Mats Wranå
- Third: Mikael Hasselborg
- Second: Anders Eriksson
- Lead: Gerry Wahlin
- Alternate: Lars Lindgren
- Finalist: Canada (Randy Neufeld)
- Women's winner: Scotland
- Skip: Jackie Lockhart
- Third: Christine Cannon
- Second: Isobel Hannen
- Lead: Margaret Richardson
- Alternate: Margaret Robertson
- Finalist: Germany (Monika Wagner)

The 2016 World Senior Curling Championships was from 16 to 23 April at the Karlstad Curling Arena in Karlstad, Sweden. The event was held in conjunction with the 2016 World Mixed Doubles Curling Championship.

== Men ==
=== Round-robin standings ===
Final Round Robin Standings

Key
Teams to Playoffs
Teams to Tiebreaker

Group A	Skip	W	L
United States	Geoff Goodland	7	1
Scotland	Gordon Muirhead	7	1
Germany	Uwe Saile	6	2
Switzerland	Stefan Karnusian	5	3
Latvia	Ansis Regža	5	3
Wales	Adrian Meikle	3	5
Czech Republic	Petr Kovac	2	6
Russia	Dimitry Dimitrievskiy	1	7
Belgium	Stef Van Heddegem	0	8

Group B	Skip	W	L
Canada	Randy Neufeld	8	0
Sweden	Mats Wranå	7	1
Ireland	Peter Wilson	6	2
Finland	Kari Keränen	4	4
Israel	Gary Gumprich	3	5
France	Pascal Adam	3	5
Slovakia	Ondrej Marcek	2	6
Netherlands	Gustaf van Imhoff	2	6
Japan	Kenji Komoda	1	7

Group C	Skip	W	L
New Zealand	Hans Frauenlob	8	0
Norway	Tormod Andreassen	7	1
Denmark	Ole de Neergaard	6	2
England	Tommy Campbell	5	3
Australia	Gerald Chick	4	4
Slovenia	Mitja Resman	2	6
Italy	Adriano Regis	2	6
Poland	Henryk Skowronski	2	6
Turkey	Did Not Attend	0	8

Turkey decided not to attend the senior championships, so all of their matches were automatically forfeited.

=== Playoffs ===
Qualification Game
A3	Germany	3
B3	Ireland	4

Quarterfinals
C1	New Zealand	5
B3	Ireland	6
B1	Canada	4
A2	Scotland	3
C2	Norway	4
B2	Sweden	10
A1	United States	4
C3	Denmark	5

Semifinals
B3	Ireland	3
B1	Canada	7
B2	Sweden	7
C3	Denmark	1

Gold-medal game
B1	Canada	4
B2	Sweden	7

Bronze-medal game
B3	Ireland	7
C3	Denmark	2

==== Bronze-medal game ====
Saturday 23 April, 13:00

Team	1	2	3	4	5	6	7	8	Final
Ireland (Wilson) 🔨	2	0	0	1	2	1	1	X	7
Denmark (Neergård)	0	0	2	0	0	0	0	X	2

==== Gold-medal game ====
Saturday 23 April, 13:00

Team	1	2	3	4	5	6	7	8	Final
Canada (Neufeld) 🔨	1	0	1	0	0	2	0	0	4
Sweden (Wranå)	0	2	0	2	1	0	1	1	7

== Women ==
=== Round-robin standings ===
Final Round Robin Standings

Key
Teams to Playoffs
Teams to Tiebreaker

Group A	Skip	W	L
England	Judith Dixon	8	0
Canada	Terri Loblaw	7	1
Sweden	Gunilla Arfwidsson Edlund	6	2
Latvia	Elēna Kāpostiņa	4	4
Japan	Miyuki Kawamura	4	4
Czech Republic	Lenka Safrankova	3	5
Australia	Sandi Gagnon	2	6
Finland	Särah Markkanen	2	6
Lithuania	Gaiva Valatkiene	0	8

Group B	Skip	W	L
Scotland	Jackie Lockhart	7	0
Switzerland	Esther Kobler	5	2
Germany	Monika Wagner	5	2
United States	Norma O'Leary	5	2
Russia	Liudmila Murova	2	5
Italy	Fiona Simpson	2	5
Austria	Veronika Huber	1	6
New Zealand	Elizabeth Matthews	1	6

=== Playoffs ===
Quarterfinals
A2	Canada	4
B3	Germany	6
B2	Switzerland	2
A3	Sweden	8

Semifinals
A1	England	4
B3	Germany	11
B1	Scotland	8
A3	Sweden	6

Final
B3	Germany	4
B1	Scotland	5

Bronze-medal game
A1	England	5
A3	Sweden	10

==== Bronze-medal game ====
Saturday 23 April, 13:00

Team	1	2	3	4	5	6	7	8	Final
England (Dixon) 🔨	0	0	3	0	0	2	0	X	5
Sweden (Arfwidsson-Edlund)	2	1	0	2	2	0	3	X	10

==== Gold-medal game ====
Saturday 23 April, 13:00

Team	1	2	3	4	5	6	7	8	9	Final
Germany (Wagner)	0	0	0	0	2	1	0	1	0	4
Scotland (Lockhart) 🔨	0	0	0	2	0	0	2	0	1	5
