= Sheena Drummie =

Scottish curler

- Curler ♀

Team
- Curling club: Lanarkshire Ice Rink, Hamilton

Curling career
- Member Association: Scotland
- World Championship: 1 (1988)
Medal record
Curling
Scottish Women's Championship
Gold medal – first place	1988

Sheena Drummie is a Scottish curler.

At the national level, she is a Scottish women's champion curler (1988).

== Teams ==
Season	Skip	Third	Second	Lead	!Events
1987–88	Christine Allison	Margaret Scott	Kimmie Brown	Sheena Drummie	SWCC 1988 (gold); WCC 1988 (9th)
