= Janet Strayer =

German curler

- Curler ♀

Curling career
- Member Association: Germany
- World Championship: 1 (1993)
Medal record
Curling
World Championships
| Silver medal – second place | 1993 Geneva |
German Women's Championship
| Gold medal – first place | 1993 |

Janet Strayer is a former German curler.

She is a 1993 World women's silver medallist.

== Teams ==
| Season | Skip | Third | Second | Lead | Alternate | Events |
|---|---|---|---|---|---|---|
| 1992–93 | Janet Strayer | Josefine Einsle | Petra Tschetsch-Hiltensberger | Karin Fischer | Elisabeth Ländle | GWCC 1993 (gold); WCC 1993 (silver) |
