= Josefine Einsle =

German curler

- Curler ♀

Team
- Curling club: CC Füssen

Curling career
- Member Association: Germany
- World Championship: 5 (1984, 1990, 1992, 1993, 1994)
- European Championship: 4 (1982, 1984, 1985, 1993)
Medal record
Curling
World Championships
Silver medal – second place	1993 Genf
Bronze medal – third place	1984 Perth
European Championships
Gold medal – first place	1984 Morzine
German Women's Championship
Gold medal – first place	1992
Gold medal – first place	1993
Gold medal – first place	1994
Silver medal – second place	1995
Silver medal – second place	1996
Bronze medal – third place	1987
Bronze medal – third place	1991

Josefine Einsle is a former German curler.

She is a European champion (1984), World silver medallist (1993) and bronze medallist (1984).

== Teams ==
Season	Skip	Third	Second	Lead	Alternate	Events
1982–83	Almut Hege	Josefine Einsle	Suzanne Koch	Petra Tschetsch		ECC 1982 (9th); WCC CR 1982 (gold)
1983–84	Almut Hege	Josefine Einsle	Suzanne Koch	Petra Tschetsch		WCC 1984 (bronze)
1984–85	Almut Hege	Josefine Einsle	Suzanne Koch	Petra Tschetsch		ECC 1984 (gold)
1985–86	Almut Hege	Petra Tschetsch	Suzanne Fink	Josefine Einsle		ECC 1985 (6th)
1989–90	Almut Hege-Schöll	Suzanne Fink	Stefan Rossler	Ina Räderer	Josefine Einsle	WCC 1990 (5th)
1991–92	Josefine Einsle	Petra Tschetsch-Hiltensberger	Elisabeth Ländle	Karin Fischer	Almut Hege-Schöll (WCC)	GWCC 1992 (gold); WCC 1992 (8th)
1992–93	Janet Strayer	Josefine Einsle	Petra Tschetsch-Hiltensberger	Karin Fischer	Elisabeth Ländle	GWCC 1993 (gold); WCC 1993 (silver)
1993–94	Josefine Einsle	Petra Tschetsch-Hiltensberger	Elisabeth Ländle	Karin Fischer	Michaela Greif	ECC 1993 (6th)
1993–94	Josefine Einsle	Michaela Greif	Petra Tschetsch-Hiltensberger	Sabine Weber	Karin Fischer	GWCC 1994 (gold)
1993–94	Josefine Einsle	Michaela Greif	Karin Fischer	Elisabeth Ländle	Sabine Weber	WCC 1994 (bronze)
