= Nancy Murdoch =

Scottish curler

Nancy Smith (born Nancy Murdoch; 17 October 1969) is a Scottish curling coach from Stewarton, Scotland. Murdoch is a former Scottish champion and former world championship semi finalist. Murdoch is now retired from competing herself and now coaches.

== Early life ==
Nancy Murdoch was born on 17 October 1969 in Dumfries, Scotland. She is the sister of David Murdoch (former European Champion and World Champion) and Neil Murdoch (former European Champion and world junior champion).

== Curler ==
Nancy Murdoch started to compete in curling at the age of 12. When interviewed for the Scottish Institute of Sport website she said that in her pre-coaching career, "Highlight was winning Scottish title in 2001. Low point was losing out in Semi final at World Championships to deny qualifying for the Olympics in Salt Lake City."

== Curling coach ==
Murdoch took up position in March 2008 as the Olympic Women's Curling Coach, for the Winter Olympic Games in Vancouver 2010.

As a National Coach, her teams have won Double World Junior Ladies Champions 2007 and 2008, European Youth Olympics' Gold medal in 2005, a World University Games' Silver Medal in 2007 and 3 World Junior Bronze medals.

She has been heavily involved with the performance level of the sport for over a decade as an Area Institute and Scottish Institute athlete, a team coach and National Coach. Throughout this time she has been at 23 Major International Championships.

== Personal life ==
She is married.
