= Wendy Bell =

Scottish curler

Wendy Bell is a Scottish and British curler who competed in Curling at the 1992 Winter Olympics when it was a demonstration sport. She played for Scotland at the 1992 and 1999 World Curling Championships.
