= Kelly Schafer =

Scottish curler

- Curler
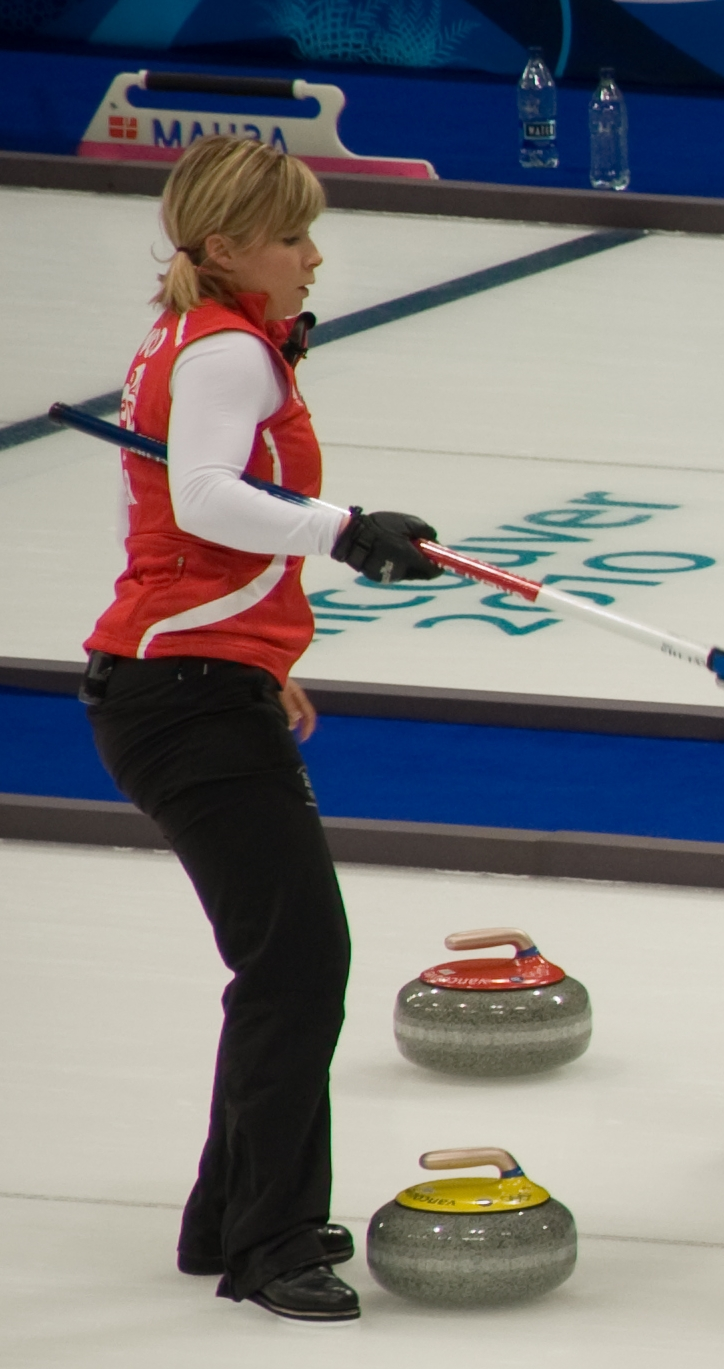
- Born: Kelly Wood; 8 April 1981 (age 45); Dundee, Scotland

Team
- Curling club: Swift Current

Curling career
- Olympic: 4 (2006, 2010, 2018)
Medal record
Curling
Representing Scotland
World Championships
Silver medal – second place	2010 Swift Current
Bronze medal – third place	2007 Aomori
Bronze medal – third place	2017 Beijing
European Championships
Gold medal – first place	2017 St Gallen
Silver medal – second place	2007 Füssen
Silver medal – second place	2010 Champéry
Bronze medal – third place	2016 Braehead
Scottish Mixed Doubles Championship
Gold medal – first place	2007 Edinburgh

Kelly Schafer (née Wood, born 8 April 1981 in Dundee) is a Scottish-Canadian curler who has represented Canada, Scotland and Great Britain on an International and Olympic level. After playing in the 2010 World Championships in Swift Current, Saskatchewan, she fell in love with and married the mayor of the city and has lived there ever since.

== Career ==
Schafer made her international curling debut competing at the 1999 World Junior Championships, representing Scotland and the Letham Grange Ice Rink. With Schafer leading the team as skip, they finished a respectable fifth position. Schafer was skip for Team Scotland at the World Juniors two more times, in 2001 and 2002. Both years the team again finished fifth.

Scotland's curling dominance over the two other host nations of Great Britain secured its place at the 2006 Winter Olympics in Turin, Italy. Schafer was shortlisted along with nine other female curlers to be considered for a place on the women's Olympic team and became successful to travel to Turin to defend Rhona Martin's Olympic gold that Team GB won in Salt Lake City in 2002. She joined Rhona Martin, Lynn Cameron, Jackie Lockhart and Debbie Knox. As in her other international games, Shaefer played second throughout the Olympic competition. However, despite beating U.S. 10–4 after only six ends, Team GB's Olympic hopes were shattered as Canada beat Denmark in a nail-biting match in the final end. A win over Canada by Denmark would have enabled Great Britain to go into a playoff to compete for the last semi-final position. When interviewed after the game Kelly conceded Team GB's loss was "gutting" but added "we [Team GB] have to take the positives out of this."

Schafer won her first medal at an international event at the 2007 World Women's Curling Championship. She skipped Scotland with teammates Jackie Lockhart, Lorna Vevers, Lindsay Wood and Karen Addison. Scotland won the bronze medal by losing in the semi-final to Denmark, skipped by Angelina Jensen.

Schafer returned to the Olympics in 2010, again playing second but this time for skip Eve Muirhead. Team Great Britain finished 7th with a record of 3–6.

A month after the Olympics Schafer again played with Muirhead, this time as third at the 2010 World Championships. Team Scotland played Germany in the final, settling for the silver medal after giving up two points in an extra end.

Though she no longer lives in Scotland, Schafer has been a frequent alternate for Team Scotland, including at the 2012 World Championships in Lethbridge, Alberta, the 2017 World Championships in Beijing, China, and for Great Britain in the 2018 Winter Olympics.

Although not yet a Canadian citizen, Schafer played for Saskatchewan at the 2014 and 2020 Canadian Mixed Curling Championship.

After becoming a citizen, she was able to compete in provincial playdowns, and joined the Robyn Silvernagle rink for the 2022–23 season with the team's goal being to represent Saskatchewan at the 2023 Scotties Tournament of Hearts. They entered the last chance qualifier for the provincial championship only having had one practice as a team. After losing their first game, they rattled off five straight victories to qualify for 2023 Saskatchewan Scotties Tournament of Hearts in Estevan. There, they continued to build momentum with wins over many higher ranked teams to qualify for the playoffs through the B side. After dropping the 1 vs. 2 game to Nancy Martin, Team Silvernagle bounced back to beat Sherry Anderson in the semifinal to qualify for the provincial final. Facing Team Martin once again, Team Silvernagle took the lead in the second end and never trailed en route to an 8–4 victory and the 2023 Saskatchewan provincial championship title. This qualified Schafer for her first Scotties which was held in Kamloops, British Columbia. The team struggled at the national championship, finishing 2–6 through the round robin with wins over Alberta's Kayla Skrlik and Nunavut's Brigitte MacPhail.

Schafer won her first Canadian national championship at the 2023 Canadian Mixed Curling Championship on home ice in Swift Current, playing third for Shaun Meachem. The team represented Canada at the 2024 World Mixed Curling Championship which was a homecoming affair for Schafer, as it was played in Scotland. There, the team went undefeated before being upset in the round of 16 to the Netherlands.

== Personal life ==
While representing Scotland at the 2010 World Championships in Swift Current, Kelly Wood met the mayor, Jerrod Schafer, and a romance developed. She would later move to the town. Kelly and Jerrod Schafer married in 2013. They have one child together. She currently works as a safe places manager for the City of Swift Current and also as a fitness coach.
