= European Junior Curling Championships =

The European Junior Curling Championships is an annual curling bonspiel held from 1983 to 1987 in the World Curling Federation's Europe zone. The championships feature curlers (women's teams only) under the age of 21 competing to qualify for a spot in the World Junior Curling Championships. Nations that participate are those which have not already qualified for the World Junior Championships. Later, from 2005 to 2016 replaced by European Junior Curling Challenge tournament.

== Summary ==
=== Women ===
Year	Host City/Country	Final			Third Place
Year	Host City/Country	Champion	Score	Second Place	Third Place
1983	Helsingborg, Sweden	Denmark	6–4	Scotland	Sweden
1984	Edinburgh, Scotland	Sweden	9–4	Norway	Scotland
1985	Copenhagen, Denmark	Norway	7–6	Scotland	Switzerland
1986	Hamburg, West Germany	Switzerland	5–3	Sweden	Norway
1987	Oslo, Norway	Norway	6–5	Sweden	Switzerland
