= 2017 World Senior Curling Championships =

- Host city: Lethbridge, Alberta
- Arena: ATB Centre
- Dates: April 22–29
- Men's winner: Sweden
- Skip: Mats Wranå
- Third: Mikael Hasselborg
- Second: Anders Eriksson
- Lead: Gerry Wåhlin
- Finalist: Canada (Bryan Cochrane)
- Women's winner: Canada
- Skip: Colleen Jones
- Third: Kim Kelly
- Second: Mary Sue Radford
- Lead: Nancy Delahunt
- Finalist: Switzerland (Cristina Lestander)

The 2017 World Senior Curling Championships was held from April 22 to 29 at the Lethbridge Curling Club in Lethbridge, Alberta. The event was held in conjunction with the 2017 World Mixed Doubles Curling Championship.

== Men ==
=== Round-robin standings ===
Key
Teams to Playoffs
Teams to Tiebreaker

Group A	Skip	W	L
Sweden	Mats Wranå	7	0
Denmark	Ulrik Schmidt	6	1
Germany	Uwe Saile	5	2
Czech Republic	Karel Kubeska	3	4
Norway	Flemming Davanger	3	4
Japan	Hideaki Nagaoka	1	6
Poland	Waldemar Zabczyk	1	6
Belgium	John Robillard	1	6

Group B	Skip	W	L
Australia	Hugh Millikin	6	1
Ireland	Peter Wilson	5	2
Israel	Kevin Golberg	5	2
Switzerland	Stefan Karnusian	5	2
United States	Mike Farbelow	3	4
Italy	Valter Bombassei	3	4
France	Jean-Claude Girodon	1	6
Kazakhstan	Roman Kazimirchik	0	7

Group C	Skip	W	L
Canada	Bryan Cochrane	6	0
New Zealand	Dan Mustapic	5	1
Wales	Adrian Meikle	3	3
Scotland	Ian Drysdale	3	3
Russia	Igor Minin	2	4
Finland	Oiva Manninen	1	5
England	Thomas Campbell	1	5

=== Playoffs ===
Qualification Game
B3	Israel	6
C3	Wales	8

Quarterfinals
C1	Canada	8
C3	Wales	1
A2	Denmark	4
B2	Ireland	5
A1	Sweden	5
C2	New Zealand	4
B1	Australia	4
A3	Germany	10

Semifinals
C1	Canada	5
B2	Ireland	2
A1	Sweden	7
A3	Germany	3

Gold Medal Game
C1	Canada	4
A1	Sweden	5

Bronze Medal Game
A3	Germany	3
B2	Ireland	7

== Women ==
=== Round-robin standings ===
Key
Teams to Playoffs
Teams to Tiebreaker

Group A	Skip	W	L
Canada	Colleen Jones	7	0
Italy	Fiona Simpson	4	3
Russia	Tatiana Smirnova	4	3
Japan	Miyuki Kawamura	4	3
Sweden	Marie Henriksson	4	3
England	Judith Dixon	3	4
Lithuania	Gaiva Valatkiene	1	6
Ireland	Carolyn Hibberd	1	6

Group B	Skip	W	L
United States	Patti Lank	5	1
Scotland	Jackie Lockhart	5	1
Switzerland	Cristina Lestander	4	2
Finland	Mari Hansen	3	3
Czech Republic	Miroslava Vařečková	3	3
Slovakia	Margita Matuskovicova	1	5
Australia	Sandy Gagnon	0	6

==== Tie Breakers ====
Thursday April 27, 8:00 am

Sheet A	1	2	3	4	5	6	7	8	Final
Italy (Simpson)	2	1	2	0	3	0	1	X	9
Sweden (Henriksson) 🔨	0	0	0	2	0	1	0	X	3

Sheet B	1	2	3	4	5	6	7	8	Final
Russia (Smirnova) 🔨	1	0	0	1	0	3	0	2	7
Japan (Kawamura)	0	1	1	0	1	0	1	0	4

=== Playoffs ===
Quarterfinals
B2	Scotland	10
A3	Russia	0
B3	Switzerland	7
A2	Italy	3

Semifinals
A1	Canada	5
B2	Scotland	3
B1	United States	4
B3	Switzerland	8

Final
A1	Canada	10
B3	Switzerland	5

Bronze Medal Game
B2	Scotland	8
B1	United States	5
