= Karen Addison =

Scottish curler (born 1970)

Karen Addison (born 28 August 1970) is a Scottish curler.

In 1990, Addison won the World Junior Curling Championships playing third for the Scottish team, skipped by her sister, Kirsty Addison. She won the gold again two years later in 1992, but did not play any games, as she was the alternate on Gillian Barr's team.

Addison has played in four European Curling Championships- winning silver medals in 1995 and 2007. She has also played in four World Curling Championships, winning a bronze in 2007 as the alternate for Scotland (skipped by Kelly Wood). She did not play any games.

At the 2008 Ford World Women's Curling Championship, after her team had a disappointing performance, skip Gail Munro was told by the National Coach Derek Brown that she was not playing the last two games, inciting protest from third Lyndsay Wilson, who as a result of this protest was also told she was not playing. This forced the team to play with just three players, with Addison skipping. Despite playing shorthanded, the team won both games.

Karen Addison was part of a squad selected to compete in the British curling team for the 2010 Winter Olympic Games, only weeks away from the event she was told that she would be the travelling alternate and after challenging this decision she was deselected.
