= Lynn Cameron =

Scottish curler

Medal record

Representing Scotland

World Junior Curling Championships
Gold medal – first place	1997 Karuizawa	Team

European Mixed Curling Championships
Gold medal – first place	2009 Prague	Team

Lynn Cameron (born 31 July 1979, in Perth) is a Scottish curler, and she was a member of the Great Britain and Northern Ireland team taking part in the 2006 Winter Olympics in Turin, Italy.

2006 was her first appearance as an Olympian. She did not appear in the 2010 Winter Olympic Games in Canada.

She was part of the Scotland curling team which won the World Junior Championships in 1997 in which Scotland beat Sweden 11–3 in the final.

In 2009, she won a gold medal at the European Mixed Curling Championship with Tom Brewster.

She is employed as a physical education teacher at Morgan Academy in Dundee.
