= Jackie Lockhart =

Scottish curler (born 1965)

- Curler
- Other names: Jacqueline Lockhart
- Born: Jacqueline Steele; 22 March 1965 (age 61); Lanark, Scotland

Team
- Curling club: Curl Aberdeen, Aberdeen
- Skip: Jackie Lockhart
- Third: Mairi Milne
- Second: Wendy Johnston
- Lead: Katie Loudon
Medal record
Curling
Representing Scotland
World Championships
Gold medal – first place	2002 Bismarck
Silver medal – second place	1985 Jönköping
Bronze medal – third place	2007 Aomori
World Senior Championships
Gold medal – first place	2016 Karlstad
Gold medal – first place	2025 Fredericton
Gold medal – first place	2026 Geneva
Silver medal – second place	2023 Gangneung
Bronze medal – third place	2017 Lethbridge
Bronze medal – third place	2022 Geneva
European Championships
Silver medal – second place	2007 Füssen
European Mixed
Gold medal – first place	2006 Claut
European Junior Ladies
Silver medal – second place	1983 Helsingborg

Jacqueline "Jackie" Lockhart (née Steele, born 22 March 1965) is a Scottish curler who has competed prolifically in major international competitions for Scotland, and for the Great Britain team that competes at the Olympic Winter Games. She was part of the BBC's Winter Olympics commentary team for the Curling at the Sochi 2014, Pyeongchang 2018, Beijing 2022 and Milan Cortina 2026.

== Biography ==
=== Early performances ===
Having made her international debut at the 1983 European Championships, she went on to claim a silver medal in her first crack at the World Championships in 1985, in which she played second in the Scotland team skipped by Isobel Torrance. The same line-up narrowly failed to win a medal in the following year's championships.

In 1992, as curling awaited full medal status at the Winter Olympics, Lockhart was skip of the team selected to represent Great Britain in the demonstration event at the Albertville Games. The team struggled somewhat, however, and were ultimately edged into sixth place after a final play-off defeat to the Swedish team skipped by Anette Norberg. Later in the same season, Lockhart and the same team represented Scotland at the World Championships, in which they secured a marginally better fifth place.

=== Olympics and World Championships ===
Later in the 1990s, eager to earn a place in the team for the first Olympic curling event to be given full medal status, Lockhart joined the established rink skipped by Kirsty Hay, which had become by then the dominant force in Scottish – and therefore also British – women's curling. In the 1998 Olympics in Nagano, the team (Kirsty Hay, Jackie Lockhart, Edith Loudon, Katie Loudon and Fiona Bayne) performed strongly, coming within a fraction of an unlikely win in the semi-finals over Canada, skipped by the renowned Sandra Schmirler. Having missed out, however, the team took a heavy beating in the bronze medal play-off at the hands of Elisabet Gustafson and her Swedish team. The same line-up took Scotland to seventh place in the World Championships a few weeks later.

Lockhart missed out on selection for the Salt Lake City Olympics in 2002, and had to watch from afar as the team skipped by Rhona Martin won plaudits for becoming the winners of Great Britain's first gold medal in any sport at the Winter Olympics since ice dancers Jayne Torvill and Christopher Dean in 1984. However, Lockhart claimed to have been nothing but inspired by what she saw on television, and was to prove her point in spectacular fashion in the weeks to follow. She started in the buzzing atmosphere that enveloped the Scottish Championships in Glasgow, where her team – largely inexperienced at the highest level apart from herself at skip – overcame Rhona Martin's rink in a three-match final to claim the right to represent Scotland at the World Championships in Bismarck, North Dakota, ahead of the newly famed Olympic gold medallists.

In Bismarck, not for the first time, Lockhart made a name for herself for her habit of constantly projecting her infectiously quirky worldview onto what was happening on the ice. She initially baffled spectators, but not her teammates, with her repeated call for stones to be delivered at boob weight – which began to make sense when she pointed out that a call for barrier weight is normally signalled by an arm across the chest. In the latter stages of the competition, despite what was at stake, she and her teammates Sheila Swan, Katriona Fairweather and Anne Laird jumped into an immediate frenzy of dancing every time a burst of pop music was played between ends. None of this distracted from the task in hand, however, and the team won Scotland's first ever women's world title.

In the wake of Lockhart's triumph, much was made of her disclosure that she had deliberately ensured that the stone she used for her last delivery in the final against Sweden was exactly the same one used by Rhona Martin to seal victory in Salt Lake City. The Scottish media dubbed it the Stone of Destiny, a slightly over-the-top allusion to the coronation stone for medieval Scottish monarchs, and it now sits as an exhibit in a sports museum.

During the 2006 Winter Olympics in Turin, Lockhart played in every game until the team's defeat to Norway, when as a result of poor performance she was replaced by Debbie Knox. She was stunned to be dropped from the team. According to the BBC news website she said "I was surprised and disappointed. I had a couple of slack shots [in Saturday's defeat to Norway]. Guess that was it."

In October 2006, Lockhart was a member of the Scottish team that won the European Mixed Curling Championship. She played third for Tom Brewster, Jr. Lockhart, playing third for Kelly Wood won the bronze medal at the 2007 World Women's Curling Championship in Aomori, Japan.

== Awards ==
- Frances Brodie Award: 1998
