= Alevtina =

Alevtina (Russian: Алевтина) or occasionally Aleftina (Russian: Алефтина) is a female given name. Notable people with the name include:

- Alevtina Aparina (1941–2013), Russian politician and member of the State Duma from 1993
- Alevtina Begisheva of Buranovskiye Babushki, a Russian (Udmurtian) ethno-pop band containing eight elderly women
- Alevtina Biktimirova (born 1982), Russian long-distance runner who specialises in the marathon
- Alevtina Fedulova (born 1940), Russian politician, member of the 1st State Duma (1993–95), chair of the Women of Russia bloc
- Alevtina Ibragimova (born 2005), Russian tennis player
- Alevtina Ivanova (born 1975), Russian long-distance runner who specialises in the marathon
- Alevtina Kolchina (1930–2022), Soviet cross-country skier
- Alevtina Kovalenko (born 1980), Russian bobsledder who has competed since 2005
- Alevtina Olyunina (1942–2025), Soviet cross-country skier
- Alevtina Priakhina (Pryakhina) (born 1972), Soviet former artistic gymnast
- Alevtina Shtaryova (born 1997), Russian ice hockey player for Tornado Moscow and the Russian national team
- Alevtina Tanygina (born 1989), Russian cross country skier

== See also ==
- Aetia (disambiguation)
- Alena (disambiguation)
- Aleta (disambiguation)
- Altina (disambiguation)
- Atina (disambiguation)
