= Altina =

Altina or al-Tina or variant, may refer to:

== People ==
- Altina Schinasi (1907–1999; aka 'Altina Carey'), U.S. artist
- Altina Lester, a 2018 participant in Chopped!; see List of Chopped episodes (seasons 21–40)
- Altina, the Italian architect responsible for the Ziade Palace

=== Fictional characters ===
- Altina, a character from the 2012 video game Shining Blade
- Altina Orion, a character from the video game franchise Trails

== Places ==
- Oltina, Romania; a village historically known as "Altina"
  - Altina, Scythia, ancient settlement
    - Altenum (castra), a Roman fort in Scythia also called "Altina"
- Altina, Belgrade, Serbia
- Altina railway station, Altina, Zemun, Serbia
- Altina Wildlife Park, Darlington Point, New South Wales, Australia
- Al-Tina, village in Israel
- Al-Tina, border town in Sudan
- el-Tina (al-Tina) railway station, see List of railway stations in Egypt
- El Tina Castle (Al Tina Castle), see List of Egyptian castles, forts, fortifications and city walls

== Other uses ==
- Altina, the Sword Princess (novel), a Japanese light novel; see List of J-Novel Club titles
- Altina (film), 2014 documentary

== See also ==
- Odostomia altina (O. altina), a species of sea snail
- Tina (disambiguation)
- Al (disambiguation)
