= Atina (given name) =

Atina is a female given name derived from the Greek goddess Athena. People with the name include:

- Atina Bojadži (1944–2010), Yugoslav marathon swimmer
- Atina Grossmann (born 1950), professor at The Cooper Union for the Advancement of Science and Art
- Atina Johnston (born 1971), Canadian curler
