= 2024 Canadian Senior Curling Championships =

Canadian national curling championship edition

2024 Everest Canadian Senior Curling Championships
- Host city: Moncton, New Brunswick
- Arena: Curl Moncton
- Dates: December 1–7, 2024
- Men's winner: Saskatchewan
- Curling club: Caledonian CC, Regina
- Skip: Randy Bryden
- Third: Troy Robinson
- Second: Russ Bryden
- Lead: Chris Semenchuck
- Finalist: Alberta (Pahl)
- Women's winner: Alberta
- Curling club: Okotoks CC, Okotoks, Calgary CC, Calgary & Sherwood Park CC, Sherwood Park
- Skip: Atina Ford-Johnston
- Third: Shannon Morris
- Second: Sheri Pickering
- Lead: Cori Morris
- Finalist: Ontario (Rizzo)

The 2024 Everest Canadian Senior Curling Championships were held from December 1 to 7 at Curl Moncton in Moncton, New Brunswick.

The championship marked the first time Moncton hosted the Canadian Senior Championships, and the tenth anniversary of Everest being the title sponsor of the event. The winning teams will represent Canada at the 2025 World Senior Curling Championships that will be held in Fredericton, New Brunswick.

== Men ==
=== Teams ===
The teams are listed as follows:

Team	Skip	Third	Second	Lead	Alternate	Club
Alberta	James Pahl	Mark Klinck	Kelly Mauthe	John Schmidt	Cory Wilson	Sherwood Park CC, Sherwood Park
British Columbia	Neil Dangerfield	Mike Wood	Darren Boden	Glen Allen	Andy Jarzebiak	Victoria CC, Victoria
Manitoba	Randy Neufeld	Dean Moxham	Peter Nicholls	Dale Michie	Darren Oryniak	La Salle CC, La Salle
New Brunswick	Mike Kennedy (Fourth)	Marc LeCocq	Vance LeCocq	Grant Odishaw (Skip)	Scott Jones	Grand Falls CC, Grand Falls; Curl Moncton, Moncton
Newfoundland and Labrador	Keith Ryan	Mike Ryan	Barry Edwards	Dennis Langdon		Carol CC, Labrador City
Northern Ontario	Ron Rosengren	Gary Maunula	Dale Wiersema	Bill Peloza		Port Arthur CC, Thunder Bay
Northwest Territories	Glen Hudy	Derek Elkin	Franz Dziuba	Jeff Nystrom	Brian Kelln	Yellowknife CC, Yellowknife
Nova Scotia	Paul Flemming	Marty Gavin	Kris Granchelli	Stuart MacLean		Halifax CC, Halifax
Nunavut	Peter Mackey	Jeff Nadeau	Greg Howard	Jamie Gauthier		Iqaluit CC, Iqaluit
Ontario	Howard Rajala	Rich Moffatt	Chris Fulton	Paul Madden	Phil Daniel	Rideau CC, Ottawa
Prince Edward Island	Eddie MacKenzie	Kevin Champion	Sean Ledgerwood	Mike Dillon	Philip Gorveatt	Cornwall CC, Cornwall
Quebec	Robert Desjardins	François Gionest	Yannick Martel	René Dubois		CC Chicoutimi, Chicoutimi; CC Riverbend, Alma
Saskatchewan	Randy Bryden	Troy Robinson	Russ Bryden	Chris Semenchuck		Caledonian CC, Regina
Yukon	Terry Miller	Chris Meger	Doug Hamilton	Don McPhee		Whitehorse CC, Whitehorse

=== Round robin standings ===
Final Round Robin Standings

Key
Teams to Championship Round

Pool A	Skip	W	L	W-L	LSD
Saskatchewan	Randy Bryden	5	1	–	312.0
Manitoba	Randy Neufeld	4	2	1–1	298.1
British Columbia	Neil Dangerfield	4	2	1–1	303.0
Nova Scotia	Paul Flemming	4	2	1–1	485.4
Newfoundland and Labrador	Keith Ryan	3	3	–	401.2
Yukon	Terry Miller	1	5	–	418.6
Northwest Territories	Glen Hudy	0	6	–	835.0

Pool B	Skip	W	L	W-L	LSD
New Brunswick	Grant Odishaw	5	1	–	260.6
Quebec	Robert Desjardins	4	2	1–0	372.8
Alberta	James Pahl	4	2	0–1	329.3
Ontario	Howard Rajala	3	3	1–0	271.7
Northern Ontario	Ron Rosengren	3	3	0–1	532.1
Prince Edward Island	Eddie MacKenzie	2	4	–	475.7
Nunavut	Peter Mackey	0	6	–	1173.5

=== Round robin results ===
All draws are listed in Atlantic Time (UTC−04:00).

==== Draw 1 ====
Sunday, December 1, 4:00 pm

Sheet C	1	2	3	4	5	6	7	8	Final
Northwest Territories (Hudy)	0	0	1	0	0	1	0	X	2
British Columbia (Dangerfield) 🔨	3	1	0	2	2	0	2	X	10

Sheet D	1	2	3	4	5	6	7	8	Final
Nunavut (Mackey)	1	0	1	0	0	0	0	X	2
Quebec (Desjardins) 🔨	0	3	0	2	0	0	2	X	7

Sheet F	1	2	3	4	5	6	7	8	Final
Nova Scotia (Flemming)	0	2	0	0	1	2	0	X	5
Saskatchewan (Bryden) 🔨	1	0	2	1	0	0	3	X	7

==== Draw 2 ====
Sunday, December 1, 8:00 pm

Sheet B	1	2	3	4	5	6	7	8	Final
Yukon (Miller) 🔨	0	1	0	2	1	0	1	0	5
Newfoundland and Labrador (Ryan)	0	0	4	0	0	1	0	3	8

Sheet C	1	2	3	4	5	6	7	8	9	Final
Prince Edward Island (MacKenzie) 🔨	1	0	1	0	0	2	0	0	1	5
Ontario (Rajala)	0	1	0	2	0	0	0	1	0	4

Sheet E	1	2	3	4	5	6	7	8	Final
Northern Ontario (Rosengren)	0	1	0	0	1	1	0	X	3
Alberta (Pahl) 🔨	1	0	5	1	0	0	3	X	10

==== Draw 3 ====
Monday, December 2, 10:00 am

Sheet A	1	2	3	4	5	6	7	8	Final
Saskatchewan (Bryden) 🔨	0	1	3	1	0	3	0	X	8
Manitoba (Neufeld)	0	0	0	0	3	0	1	X	4

Sheet B	1	2	3	4	5	6	7	8	Final
Alberta (Pahl)	1	0	3	1	1	0	0	1	7
New Brunswick (Odishaw) 🔨	0	1	0	0	0	2	2	0	5

Sheet E	1	2	3	4	5	6	7	8	Final
Ontario (Rajala) 🔨	1	0	4	2	0	0	0	X	7
Nunavut (Mackey)	0	2	0	0	0	0	2	X	4

Sheet H	1	2	3	4	5	6	7	8	Final
Newfoundland and Labrador (Ryan) 🔨	1	0	0	0	3	1	1	X	6
Northwest Territories (Hudy)	0	1	1	1	0	0	0	X	3

==== Draw 4 ====
Monday, December 2, 2:00 pm

Sheet A	1	2	3	4	5	6	7	8	Final
Nova Scotia (Flemming) 🔨	0	1	0	2	0	3	0	1	7
Yukon (Miller)	1	0	1	0	1	0	2	0	5

Sheet B	1	2	3	4	5	6	7	8	Final
Northern Ontario (Rosengren)	1	0	2	0	0	3	2	X	8
Prince Edward Island (MacKenzie)	0	1	0	1	1	0	0	X	3

Sheet E	1	2	3	4	5	6	7	8	Final
Manitoba (Neufeld)	0	0	1	0	1	1	0	X	3
British Columbia (Dangerfield) 🔨	4	4	0	1	0	0	2	X	11

Sheet F	1	2	3	4	5	6	7	8	Final
New Brunswick (Odishaw)	1	1	1	2	0	3	X	X	8
Quebec (Desjardins) 🔨	0	0	0	0	1	0	X	X	1

==== Draw 5 ====
Monday, December 2, 6:00 pm

Sheet C	1	2	3	4	5	6	7	8	Final
Newfoundland and Labrador (Ryan)	0	0	2	0	0	0	1	0	3
Nova Scotia (Flemming) 🔨	0	2	0	1	0	1	0	1	5

Sheet D	1	2	3	4	5	6	7	8	Final
Ontario (Rajala) 🔨	2	2	0	0	1	0	0	1	6
Northern Ontario (Rosengren)	0	0	1	1	0	2	1	0	5

Sheet G	1	2	3	4	5	6	7	8	Final
Saskatchewan (Bryden) 🔨	4	4	0	0	1	0	2	X	11
Northwest Territories (Hudy)	0	0	1	1	0	1	0	X	3

Sheet H	1	2	3	4	5	6	7	8	Final
Alberta (Pahl) 🔨	4	3	1	0	2	0	X	X	10
Nunavut (Mackey)	0	0	0	1	0	1	X	X	2

==== Draw 6 ====
Tuesday, December 3, 10:00 am

Sheet A	1	2	3	4	5	6	7	8	Final
New Brunswick (Odishaw)	0	2	1	0	0	2	1	2	8
Ontario (Rajala) 🔨	3	0	0	1	0	0	0	0	4

Sheet D	1	2	3	4	5	6	7	8	9	Final
Manitoba (Neufeld) 🔨	1	0	2	0	0	0	1	2	1	7
Newfoundland and Labrador (Ryan)	0	3	0	2	1	0	0	0	0	6

Sheet F	1	2	3	4	5	6	7	8	Final
Northwest Territories (Hudy) 🔨	1	0	0	0	2	0	0	X	3
Yukon (Miller)	0	2	2	1	0	4	1	X	10

Sheet G	1	2	3	4	5	6	7	8	Final
Nunavut (Mackey)	0	0	2	0	0	1	0	X	3
Prince Edward Island (MacKenzie) 🔨	2	1	0	1	2	0	4	X	10

==== Draw 7 ====
Tuesday, December 3, 2:00 pm

Sheet A	1	2	3	4	5	6	7	8	Final
Northern Ontario (Rosengren) 🔨	2	2	0	4	1	1	X	X	10
Nunavut (Mackey)	0	0	2	0	0	0	X	X	2

Sheet B	1	2	3	4	5	6	7	8	Final
British Columbia (Dangerfield)	0	0	0	0	1	0	X	X	1
Saskatchewan (Bryden) 🔨	0	0	4	1	0	3	X	X	8

Sheet C	1	2	3	4	5	6	7	8	Final
Ontario (Rajala) 🔨	0	1	2	0	1	0	1	0	5
Quebec (Desjardins)	1	0	0	1	0	2	0	2	6

Sheet E	1	2	3	4	5	6	7	8	Final
Yukon (Miller)	0	0	1	0	1	1	0	X	3
Manitoba (Neufeld) 🔨	3	1	0	2	0	0	3	X	9

==== Draw 8 ====
Tuesday, December 3, 6:00 pm

Sheet A	1	2	3	4	5	6	7	8	Final
Quebec (Desjardins) 🔨	0	1	0	1	1	0	3	2	8
Alberta (Pahl)	2	0	1	0	0	3	0	0	6

Sheet D	1	2	3	4	5	6	7	8	Final
Nova Scotia (Flemming) 🔨	4	0	4	5	1	4	X	X	18
Northwest Territories (Hudy)	0	0	0	0	0	0	X	X	0

Sheet F	1	2	3	4	5	6	7	8	Final
Newfoundland and Labrador (Ryan) 🔨	1	0	0	0	1	1	0	X	3
British Columbia (Dangerfield)	0	6	1	1	0	0	1	X	9

Sheet H	1	2	3	4	5	6	7	8	Final
Prince Edward Island (MacKenzie)	0	4	0	1	0	0	0	0	5
New Brunswick (Odishaw) 🔨	2	0	1	0	1	1	1	1	7

==== Draw 9 ====
Wednesday, December 4, 10:00 am

Sheet C	1	2	3	4	5	6	7	8	Final
Yukon (Miller) 🔨	1	0	0	0	1	0	X	X	2
Saskatchewan (Bryden)	0	1	4	1	0	5	X	X	11

Sheet D	1	2	3	4	5	6	7	8	Final
Prince Edward Island (MacKenzie) 🔨	3	0	1	0	0	0	0	X	4
Alberta (Pahl)	0	3	0	3	1	2	2	X	11

Sheet E	1	2	3	4	5	6	7	8	Final
British Columbia (Dangerfield) 🔨	0	3	0	0	1	0	0	1	5
Nova Scotia (Flemming)	0	0	2	0	0	3	1	0	6

Sheet G	1	2	3	4	5	6	7	8	9	Final
Quebec (Desjardins)	0	2	0	2	1	0	0	1	0	6
Northern Ontario (Rosengren) 🔨	1	0	1	0	0	1	3	0	1	7

==== Draw 10 ====
Wednesday, December 4, 2:00 pm

Sheet B	1	2	3	4	5	6	7	8	Final
Northwest Territories (Hudy)	0	1	0	0	1	0	X	X	2
Manitoba (Neufeld) 🔨	2	0	3	1	0	3	X	X	9

Sheet C	1	2	3	4	5	6	7	8	Final
Nunavut (Mackey)	0	0	0	1	0	1	X	X	2
New Brunswick (Odishaw) 🔨	1	1	2	0	5	0	X	X	9

Sheet E	1	2	3	4	5	6	7	8	Final
Saskatchewan (Bryden)	0	1	0	0	0	3	0	0	4
Newfoundland and Labrador (Ryan) 🔨	1	0	0	1	1	0	1	1	5

Sheet F	1	2	3	4	5	6	7	8	Final
Alberta (Pahl)	0	2	0	0	1	0	X	X	3
Ontario (Rajala) 🔨	4	0	1	1	0	3	X	X	9

==== Draw 11 ====
Wednesday, December 4, 6:00 pm

Sheet C	1	2	3	4	5	6	7	8	Final
Quebec (Desjardins) 🔨	0	3	0	1	0	2	0	2	8
Prince Edward Island (MacKenzie)	1	0	1	0	2	0	1	0	5

Sheet D	1	2	3	4	5	6	7	8	Final
British Columbia (Dangerfield) 🔨	1	0	1	0	2	0	0	2	6
Yukon (Miller)	0	2	0	1	0	2	0	0	5

Sheet G	1	2	3	4	5	6	7	8	Final
Manitoba (Neufeld) 🔨	0	0	2	2	0	0	0	2	6
Nova Scotia (Flemming)	0	1	0	0	1	1	1	0	4

Sheet H	1	2	3	4	5	6	7	8	Final
New Brunswick (Odishaw) 🔨	1	1	0	0	1	1	0	X	4
Northern Ontario (Rosengren)	0	0	0	1	0	0	0	X	1

=== Seeding pool ===
==== Standings ====
Final Seeding Pool Standings

Team	Skip	W	L	W-L	LSD
Newfoundland and Labrador	Keith Ryan	6	3	–	882.1
Northern Ontario	Ron Rosengren	5	4	–	851.1
Prince Edward Island	Eddie MacKenzie	4	5	–	750.7
Yukon	Terry Miller	2	7	–	748.4
Northwest Territories	Glen Hudy	1	8	–	1706.8
Nunavut	Peter Mackey	0	9	–	1581.2

==== Results ====
===== Draw 12 =====
Thursday, December 5, 8:30 am

Sheet A	1	2	3	4	5	6	7	8	Final
Prince Edward Island (MacKenzie) 🔨	1	2	0	2	3	0	2	X	10
Yukon (Miller)	0	0	3	0	0	1	0	X	4

Sheet C	1	2	3	4	5	6	7	8	Final
Newfoundland and Labrador (Ryan)	0	1	1	0	3	3	0	X	8
Nunavut (Mackey) 🔨	1	0	0	3	0	0	0	X	4

Sheet E	1	2	3	4	5	6	7	8	Final
Northern Ontario (Rosengren) 🔨	0	2	1	1	0	0	0	3	7
Northwest Territories (Hudy)	1	0	0	0	1	2	1	0	5

===== Draw 14 =====
Thursday, December 5, 4:30 pm

Sheet A	1	2	3	4	5	6	7	8	9	Final
Nunavut (Mackey) 🔨	0	4	0	0	1	0	0	1	0	6
Northwest Territories (Hudy)	1	0	1	1	0	2	1	0	1	7

Sheet C	1	2	3	4	5	6	7	8	Final
Yukon (Miller) 🔨	1	0	0	3	1	0	1	0	6
Northern Ontario (Rosengren)	0	3	1	0	0	2	0	1	7

Sheet E	1	2	3	4	5	6	7	8	Final
Prince Edward Island (MacKenzie) 🔨	1	0	1	0	0	0	X	X	2
Newfoundland and Labrador (Ryan)	0	1	0	3	0	4	X	X	8

===== Draw 17 =====
Friday, December 6, 2:00 pm

Sheet B	1	2	3	4	5	6	7	8	Final
Newfoundland and Labrador (Ryan) 🔨	0	0	0	0	0	2	2	X	4
Northern Ontario (Rosengren)	0	0	0	1	0	0	0	X	1

Sheet D	1	2	3	4	5	6	7	8	Final
Northwest Territories (Hudy)	0	0	2	0	0	0	0	X	2
Prince Edward Island (MacKenzie) 🔨	1	1	0	1	2	0	1	X	6

Sheet F	1	2	3	4	5	6	7	8	Final
Yukon (Miller)	3	0	1	1	0	2	3	X	10
Nunavut (Mackey) 🔨	0	2	0	0	2	0	0	X	4

=== Championship pool ===
==== Standings ====
Final Championship Pool Standings

Key
Teams to Playoffs

Team	Skip	W	L	W-L	LSD
New Brunswick	Grant Odishaw	8	2	1–1	620.9
Manitoba	Randy Neufeld	8	2	1–1	740.0
Saskatchewan	Randy Bryden	8	2	1–1	741.6
Alberta	James Pahl	6	4	1–0	714.9
British Columbia	Neil Dangerfield	6	4	0–1	544.6
Quebec	Robert Desjardins	5	5	1–0	724.8
Nova Scotia	Paul Flemming	5	5	0–1	990.1
Ontario	Howard Rajala	3	7	–	597.7

==== Results ====
===== Draw 13 =====
Thursday, December 5, 12:30 pm

Sheet E	1	2	3	4	5	6	7	8	Final
Saskatchewan (Bryden)	0	1	0	1	0	2	0	1	5
Ontario (Rajala) 🔨	1	0	1	0	1	0	1	0	4

Sheet F	1	2	3	4	5	6	7	8	Final
Manitoba (Neufeld)	0	0	1	2	0	0	3	X	6
New Brunswick (Odishaw) 🔨	2	1	0	0	0	1	0	X	4

Sheet G	1	2	3	4	5	6	7	8	Final
British Columbia (Dangerfield) 🔨	2	0	5	0	1	0	X	X	8
Quebec (Desjardins)	0	1	0	2	0	1	X	X	4

Sheet H	1	2	3	4	5	6	7	8	Final
Nova Scotia (Flemming)	0	2	0	0	0	1	0	X	3
Alberta (Pahl) 🔨	1	0	2	1	2	0	2	X	8

===== Draw 15 =====
Thursday, December 5, 8:30 pm

Sheet A	1	2	3	4	5	6	7	8	Final
Alberta (Pahl)	0	0	2	0	1	0	2	X	5
Saskatchewan (Bryden) 🔨	1	2	0	2	0	3	0	X	8

Sheet B	1	2	3	4	5	6	7	8	Final
Ontario (Rajala)	2	0	0	0	0	1	1	0	4
Manitoba (Neufeld) 🔨	0	1	2	0	0	0	0	3	6

Sheet C	1	2	3	4	5	6	7	8	Final
New Brunswick (Odishaw) 🔨	1	0	3	0	2	0	1	X	7
British Columbia (Dangerfield)	0	1	0	1	0	2	0	X	4

Sheet D	1	2	3	4	5	6	7	8	9	Final
Quebec (Desjardins) 🔨	2	0	1	0	1	0	2	0	1	7
Nova Scotia (Flemming)	0	2	0	1	0	2	0	1	0	6

===== Draw 16 =====
Friday, December 6, 10:00 am

Sheet E	1	2	3	4	5	6	7	8	Final
Manitoba (Neufeld) 🔨	2	2	0	1	0	0	0	3	8
Alberta (Pahl)	0	0	1	0	2	2	2	0	7

Sheet F	1	2	3	4	5	6	7	8	Final
Saskatchewan (Bryden) 🔨	2	2	0	1	0	1	0	3	9
Quebec (Desjardins)	0	0	2	0	1	0	3	0	6

Sheet G	1	2	3	4	5	6	7	8	Final
Nova Scotia (Flemming)	0	0	3	0	1	0	1	0	5
New Brunswick (Odishaw) 🔨	2	1	0	2	0	2	0	1	8

Sheet H	1	2	3	4	5	6	7	8	Final
British Columbia (Dangerfield) 🔨	2	0	3	0	2	0	1	X	8
Ontario (Rajala)	0	2	0	1	0	1	0	X	4

===== Draw 18 =====
Friday, December 6, 6:00 pm

Sheet A	1	2	3	4	5	6	7	8	Final
Ontario (Rajala) 🔨	1	0	1	1	0	0	3	0	6
Nova Scotia (Flemming)	0	3	0	0	1	3	0	1	8

Sheet B	1	2	3	4	5	6	7	8	Final
Alberta (Pahl)	0	3	0	2	1	2	X	X	8
British Columbia (Dangerfield) 🔨	0	0	1	0	0	0	X	X	1

Sheet C	1	2	3	4	5	6	7	8	Final
Quebec (Desjardins) 🔨	2	0	2	1	0	1	0	0	6
Manitoba (Neufeld)	0	1	0	0	2	0	0	4	7

Sheet D	1	2	3	4	5	6	7	8	Final
New Brunswick (Odishaw) 🔨	1	1	0	1	0	1	3	X	7
Saskatchewan (Bryden)	0	0	1	0	2	0	0	X	3

=== Playoffs ===
Semifinals
1	New Brunswick	5
4	Alberta	8
2	Manitoba	6
3	Saskatchewan	7

Final
4	Alberta	5
3	Saskatchewan	7
Bronze medal game
1	New Brunswick	8
2	Manitoba	5

==== Semifinals ====
Saturday, December 7, 8:30 am

Sheet B	1	2	3	4	5	6	7	8	9	Final
Manitoba (Neufeld)	0	1	0	3	0	0	2	0	0	6
Saskatchewan (Bryden) 🔨	1	0	1	0	2	1	0	1	1	7

Sheet D	1	2	3	4	5	6	7	8	Final
New Brunswick (Odishaw) 🔨	0	2	0	2	0	1	0	0	5
Alberta (Pahl)	2	0	1	0	2	0	2	1	8

==== Bronze medal game ====
Saturday, December 7, 12:30 pm

Sheet C	1	2	3	4	5	6	7	8	Final
New Brunswick (Odishaw)	0	2	2	0	0	1	2	1	8
Manitoba (Neufeld) 🔨	3	0	0	1	1	0	0	0	5

==== Gold medal game ====
Saturday, December 7, 12:30 pm

Sheet D	1	2	3	4	5	6	7	8	Final
Alberta (Pahl)	0	1	0	1	0	2	0	1	5
Saskatchewan (Bryden) 🔨	0	0	2	0	2	0	3	0	7

=== Final standings ===
Place	Team
1st place, gold medalist(s)	Saskatchewan
2nd place, silver medalist(s)	Alberta
3rd place, bronze medalist(s)	New Brunswick
4	Manitoba
5	British Columbia
6	Quebec
7	Nova Scotia
8	Ontario

Place	Team
9	Newfoundland and Labrador
10	Northern Ontario
11	Prince Edward Island
12	Yukon
13	Northwest Territories
14	Nunavut

== Women ==
=== Teams ===
The teams are listed as follows:

Team	Skip	Third	Second	Lead	Alternate	Club
Alberta	Atina Ford-Johnston	Shannon Morris	Sheri Pickering	Cori Morris		Okotoks CC, Okotoks; Calgary CC, Calgary; Sherwood Park CC, Sherwood Park
British Columbia	Diane Gushulak	Grace MacInnes	Danielle Shaughnessy	Cory Atchison	Allison MacInnes	Royal City CC, New Westminster; Kelowna CC, Kelowna
Manitoba	Kathy Isaac	Lynn Sandercock	Sheila Gregory	Sandra Cowling		Hamiota CC, Hamiota
New Brunswick	Shelly Graham	Debbie McCann	Robyn Witherell	Shelley Murray	Michelle Majeau	Capital WC, Fredericton
Newfoundland and Labrador	Wendy Dunne	Marcie Brown	Donna Davis	Sheryl Ryan		Carol CC, Labrador City
Northern Ontario	Lori Hoppe	Shannon Brown	Lisa Penner	Jacqueline Ortlieb		Kenora CC, Kenora
Northwest Territories	Sharon Cormier	Cheryl Tordoff	Marta Moir	Kelly Kaylo	Wendy Ondrack	Yellowknife CC, Yellowknife
Nova Scotia	Theresa Breen (Fourth)	Kerri Denny	Jayne Flinn-Burton	Mary Sue Radford (Skip)		Halifax CC, Halifax
Nunavut	Geneva Chislett	Denise Hutchings	Robyn Mackey	Lisa Kirk	Angela Chislett	Iqaluit CC, Iqaluit
Ontario	Jo-Ann Rizzo	Janet Murphy	Lori Eddy	Mary Chilvers		Mississaugua G&CC, Mississauga
Prince Edward Island	Shelly Bradley (Fourth)	Susan McInnis (Skip)	Tricia MacGregor	Julie Scales		Cornwall CC, Cornwall
Quebec	Luanne Waddell	Isabelle Néron	Cyntia Plouffe	Nathalie Bruneau	Joëlle Sabourin	Curling des Collines, Chelsea; Buckingham CC, Buckingham; CC Chicoutimi, Chicoutimi; CC St-Bruno, Saint-Bruno-de-Montarville
Saskatchewan	Tracy Streifel	Candace Newkirk	Danette Tracey	Julie Vandenameele		Nutana CC, Saskatoon
Yukon	Rhonda Horte	Sandra Mikkelsen	Helen Strong	Corinne Delaire		Whitehorse CC, Whitehorse

=== Round robin standings ===
Final Round Robin Standings

Key
Teams to Championship Round

Pool A	Skip	W	L	W-L	LSD
Nova Scotia	Mary Sue Radford	6	0	–	379.1
Saskatchewan	Tracy Streifel	4	2	1–0	591.6
Quebec	Luanne Waddell	4	2	0–1	786.2
Northern Ontario	Lori Hoppe	3	3	–	827.3
Newfoundland and Labrador	Wendy Dunne	2	4	1–0	858.3
New Brunswick	Shelly Graham	2	4	0–1	493.3
Manitoba	Kathy Isaac	0	6	–	845.6

Pool B	Skip	W	L	W-L	LSD
Ontario	Jo-Ann Rizzo	6	0	–	410.4
Alberta	Atina Ford-Johnston	5	1	–	436.6
British Columbia	Diane Gushulak	4	2	–	509.7
Prince Edward Island	Susan McInnis	3	3	–	691.0
Northwest Territories	Sharon Cormier	2	4	–	621.5
Yukon	Rhonda Horte	1	5	–	441.6
Nunavut	Geneva Chislett	0	6	–	1197.2

=== Round robin results ===
All draws are listed in Atlantic Time (UTC−04:00).

==== Draw 1 ====
Sunday, December 1, 4:00 pm

Sheet A	1	2	3	4	5	6	7	8	Final
New Brunswick (Graham) 🔨	0	0	2	0	2	1	0	X	5
Northern Ontario (Hoppe)	2	3	0	1	0	0	5	X	11

Sheet B	1	2	3	4	5	6	7	8	Final
Nunavut (Chislett)	1	1	0	1	0	0	1	X	4
Yukon (Horte) 🔨	0	0	4	0	4	2	0	X	10

Sheet E	1	2	3	4	5	6	7	8	Final
British Columbia (Gushulak) 🔨	0	0	2	2	0	1	0	0	5
Alberta (Ford-Johnston)	1	2	0	0	2	0	0	2	7

Sheet G	1	2	3	4	5	6	7	8	Final
Newfoundland and Labrador (Dunne)	0	1	0	2	1	0	0	X	4
Saskatchewan (Streifel) 🔨	2	0	2	0	0	2	1	X	7

==== Draw 2 ====
Sunday, December 1, 8:00 pm

Sheet D	1	2	3	4	5	6	7	8	Final
Manitoba (Isaac)	0	0	0	1	0	0	1	X	2
Nova Scotia (Radford) 🔨	0	0	2	0	3	0	0	X	5

Sheet F	1	2	3	4	5	6	7	8	Final
Prince Edward Island (McInnis)	0	0	1	0	0	1	0	X	2
Ontario (Rizzo) 🔨	1	2	0	0	2	0	1	X	6

==== Draw 3 ====
Monday, December 2, 10:00 am

Sheet C	1	2	3	4	5	6	7	8	Final
Saskatchewan (Streifel) 🔨	2	0	1	2	1	2	0	1	9
Quebec (Waddell)	0	2	0	0	0	0	2	0	4

Sheet D	1	2	3	4	5	6	7	8	Final
Alberta (Ford-Johnston)	5	1	1	0	2	0	1	X	10
Northwest Territories (Cormier) 🔨	0	0	0	1	0	1	0	X	2

Sheet F	1	2	3	4	5	6	7	8	Final
Nova Scotia (Radford) 🔨	1	0	0	0	1	2	6	X	10
New Brunswick (Graham)	0	1	1	0	0	0	0	X	2

Sheet G	1	2	3	4	5	6	7	8	Final
Ontario (Rizzo) 🔨	1	0	1	0	2	3	0	X	7
Nunavut (Chislett)	0	1	0	1	0	0	1	X	3

==== Draw 4 ====
Monday, December 2, 2:00 pm

Sheet C	1	2	3	4	5	6	7	8	Final
Newfoundland and Labrador (Dunne)	0	1	2	2	0	0	0	2	7
Manitoba (Isaac) 🔨	2	0	0	0	2	1	1	0	6

Sheet D	1	2	3	4	5	6	7	8	Final
British Columbia (Gushulak) 🔨	2	0	2	0	1	2	1	0	8
Prince Edward Island (McInnis)	0	2	0	4	0	0	0	1	7

Sheet G	1	2	3	4	5	6	7	8	Final
Northwest Territories (Cormier) 🔨	0	2	2	0	0	0	0	2	6
Yukon (Horte)	2	0	0	1	1	0	1	0	5

Sheet H	1	2	3	4	5	6	7	8	9	Final
Quebec (Waddell) 🔨	2	0	1	0	0	2	0	2	2	9
Northern Ontario (Hoppe)	0	2	0	1	0	0	4	0	0	7

==== Draw 5 ====
Monday, December 2, 6:00 pm

Sheet A	1	2	3	4	5	6	7	8	Final
Nova Scotia (Radford) 🔨	1	1	3	2	0	0	1	X	8
Newfoundland and Labrador (Dunne)	0	0	0	0	1	1	0	X	2

Sheet B	1	2	3	4	5	6	7	8	Final
Ontario (Rizzo)	3	2	2	2	1	0	X	X	10
British Columbia (Gushulak) 🔨	0	0	0	0	0	1	X	X	1

Sheet E	1	2	3	4	5	6	7	8	Final
Saskatchewan (Streifel)	0	1	0	1	0	1	2	0	5
New Brunswick (Graham) 🔨	1	0	2	0	1	0	0	2	6

Sheet F	1	2	3	4	5	6	7	8	Final
Alberta (Ford-Johnston) 🔨	1	1	2	3	2	1	X	X	10
Nunavut (Chislett)	0	0	0	0	0	0	X	X	0

==== Draw 6 ====
Tuesday, December 3, 10:00 am

Sheet B	1	2	3	4	5	6	7	8	Final
Quebec (Waddell)	2	0	1	0	0	1	1	X	5
Nova Scotia (Radford) 🔨	0	1	0	2	4	0	0	X	7

Sheet C	1	2	3	4	5	6	7	8	Final
Northwest Territories (Cormier) 🔨	0	2	1	0	0	0	1	X	4
Ontario (Rizzo)	2	0	0	2	1	1	0	X	6

Sheet E	1	2	3	4	5	6	7	8	Final
Nunavut (Chislett)	0	1	0	0	0	0	X	X	1
Prince Edward Island (McInnis) 🔨	1	0	1	2	1	3	X	X	8

Sheet H	1	2	3	4	5	6	7	8	Final
New Brunswick (Graham) 🔨	0	3	0	3	0	2	0	X	8
Manitoba (Isaac)	1	0	1	0	1	0	1	X	4

==== Draw 7 ====
Tuesday, December 3, 2:00 pm

Sheet D	1	2	3	4	5	6	7	8	Final
Nova Scotia (Radford) 🔨	0	2	1	0	0	2	1	X	6
Northern Ontario (Hoppe)	1	0	0	1	1	0	0	X	3

Sheet F	1	2	3	4	5	6	7	8	Final
Yukon (Horte)	0	1	0	0	0	1	0	X	2
Alberta (Ford-Johnston) 🔨	2	0	3	2	1	0	1	X	9

Sheet G	1	2	3	4	5	6	7	8	Final
Manitoba (Isaac)	1	0	0	0	1	0	X	X	2
Quebec (Waddell) 🔨	0	3	2	2	0	3	X	X	10

Sheet H	1	2	3	4	5	6	7	8	Final
Prince Edward Island (McInnis)	0	0	2	0	0	3	0	1	6
Northwest Territories (Cormier) 🔨	1	1	0	1	1	0	1	0	5

==== Draw 8 ====
Tuesday, December 3, 6:00 pm

Sheet B	1	2	3	4	5	6	7	8	Final
Newfoundland and Labrador (Dunne)	1	1	0	1	0	0	1	1	5
New Brunswick (Graham) 🔨	0	0	1	0	1	1	0	0	3

Sheet C	1	2	3	4	5	6	7	8	Final
British Columbia (Gushulak)	2	0	2	0	1	1	1	X	7
Nunavut (Chislett) 🔨	0	1	0	0	0	0	0	X	1

Sheet E	1	2	3	4	5	6	7	8	Final
Ontario (Rizzo) 🔨	3	1	0	0	0	2	0	1	7
Yukon (Horte)	0	0	2	0	3	0	1	0	6

Sheet G	1	2	3	4	5	6	7	8	Final
Northern Ontario (Hoppe) 🔨	1	0	1	0	0	1	0	X	3
Saskatchewan (Streifel)	0	5	0	2	1	0	1	X	9

==== Draw 9 ====
Wednesday, December 4, 10:00 am

Sheet A	1	2	3	4	5	6	7	8	Final
Manitoba (Isaac)	0	1	0	1	0	0	2	0	4
Saskatchewan (Streifel) 🔨	2	0	1	0	1	1	0	1	6

Sheet B	1	2	3	4	5	6	7	8	Final
Prince Edward Island (McInnis) 🔨	0	1	1	0	0	0	1	0	3
Alberta (Ford-Johnston)	0	0	0	1	0	1	0	2	4

Sheet F	1	2	3	4	5	6	7	8	Final
Northern Ontario (Hoppe)	1	0	1	0	0	3	2	X	7
Newfoundland and Labrador (Dunne) 🔨	0	1	0	1	0	0	0	X	2

Sheet H	1	2	3	4	5	6	7	8	Final
Yukon (Horte) 🔨	0	1	0	0	0	0	X	X	1
British Columbia (Gushulak)	2	0	3	3	1	1	X	X	10

==== Draw 10 ====
Wednesday, December 4, 2:00 pm

Sheet A	1	2	3	4	5	6	7	8	Final
Nunavut (Chislett) 🔨	3	0	0	0	0	1	0	X	4
Northwest Territories (Cormier)	0	3	1	1	1	0	4	X	10

Sheet D	1	2	3	4	5	6	7	8	Final
New Brunswick (Graham) 🔨	2	1	0	1	1	0	0	0	5
Quebec (Waddell)	0	0	3	0	0	2	1	1	7

Sheet G	1	2	3	4	5	6	7	8	Final
Saskatchewan (Streifel)	1	0	2	0	1	0	0	0	4
Nova Scotia (Radford) 🔨	0	2	0	2	0	2	1	1	8

Sheet H	1	2	3	4	5	6	7	8	Final
Alberta (Ford-Johnston)	0	0	0	0	1	0	2	0	3
Ontario (Rizzo) 🔨	1	0	1	1	0	1	0	1	5

==== Draw 11 ====
Wednesday, December 4, 6:00 pm

Sheet A	1	2	3	4	5	6	7	8	Final
Yukon (Horte) 🔨	0	2	0	0	1	1	2	X	6
Prince Edward Island (McInnis)	4	0	3	3	0	0	0	X	10

Sheet B	1	2	3	4	5	6	7	8	9	Final
Northern Ontario (Hoppe)	0	0	0	2	0	2	0	3	1	8
Manitoba (Isaac) 🔨	1	2	2	0	1	0	1	0	0	7

Sheet E	1	2	3	4	5	6	7	8	Final
Quebec (Waddell) 🔨	1	0	3	0	1	0	3	X	8
Newfoundland and Labrador (Dunne)	0	3	0	1	0	1	0	X	5

Sheet F	1	2	3	4	5	6	7	8	Final
Northwest Territories (Cormier)	0	0	1	0	0	0	0	X	1
British Columbia (Gushulak) 🔨	0	1	0	1	2	1	1	X	6

=== Seeding pool ===
==== Standings ====
Final Seeding Pool Standings

Team	Skip	W	L	W-L	LSD
Newfoundland and Labrador	Wendy Dunne	5	4	–	1470.9
New Brunswick	Shelly Graham	4	5	–	1099.0
Northwest Territories	Sharon Cormier	3	6	–	1077.6
Manitoba	Kathy Isaac	2	7	1–0	1293.8
Yukon	Rhonda Horte	2	7	0–1	997.1
Nunavut	Geneva Chislett	0	9	–	1881.6

==== Results ====
===== Draw 12 =====
Thursday, December 5, 8:30 am

Sheet B	1	2	3	4	5	6	7	8	Final
Newfoundland and Labrador (Dunne)	0	2	0	4	0	3	X	X	9
Nunavut (Chislett) 🔨	1	0	1	0	1	0	X	X	3

Sheet D	1	2	3	4	5	6	7	8	Final
Northwest Territories (Cormier) 🔨	2	2	0	0	2	0	2	X	8
Manitoba (Isaac)	0	0	1	1	0	2	0	X	4

Sheet F	1	2	3	4	5	6	7	8	Final
Yukon (Horte) 🔨	0	2	1	0	2	0	0	4	9
New Brunswick (Graham)	1	0	0	2	0	1	1	0	5

===== Draw 14 =====
Thursday, December 5, 4:30 pm

Sheet B	1	2	3	4	5	6	7	8	Final
New Brunswick (Graham) 🔨	0	2	0	0	1	1	0	2	6
Northwest Territories (Cormier)	0	0	0	1	0	0	3	0	4

Sheet D	1	2	3	4	5	6	7	8	Final
Yukon (Horte)	0	0	0	1	0	0	0	X	1
Newfoundland and Labrador (Dunne) 🔨	1	0	1	0	3	1	1	X	7

Sheet F	1	2	3	4	5	6	7	8	Final
Nunavut (Chislett)	0	0	0	2	0	1	0	X	3
Manitoba (Isaac) 🔨	2	1	1	0	1	0	1	X	6

===== Draw 17 =====
Friday, December 6, 2:00 pm

Sheet A	1	2	3	4	5	6	7	8	Final
New Brunswick (Graham) 🔨	2	2	2	0	4	1	X	X	11
Nunavut (Chislett)	0	0	0	1	0	0	X	X	1

Sheet C	1	2	3	4	5	6	7	8	Final
Newfoundland and Labrador (Dunne)	0	1	0	0	1	4	3	X	9
Northwest Territories (Cormier) 🔨	2	0	1	1	0	0	0	X	4

Sheet E	1	2	3	4	5	6	7	8	Final
Manitoba (Isaac) 🔨	1	1	0	2	0	0	1	1	6
Yukon (Horte)	0	0	4	0	1	0	0	0	5

=== Championship pool ===
==== Standings ====
Final Championship Pool Standings

Key
Teams to Playoffs

Team	Skip	W	L	W-L	LSD
Ontario	Jo-Ann Rizzo	10	0	–	810.1
Alberta	Atina Ford-Johnston	8	2	1–0	886.3
Nova Scotia	Mary Sue Radford	8	2	0–1	816.7
Quebec	Luanne Waddell	7	3	–	1571.2
British Columbia	Diane Gushulak	6	4	–	928.6
Saskatchewan	Tracy Streifel	5	5	–	1141.0
Prince Edward Island	Susan McInnis	4	6	–	1635.2
Northern Ontario	Lori Hoppe	3	7	–	1847.0

==== Results ====
===== Draw 13 =====
Thursday, December 5, 12:30 pm

Sheet A	1	2	3	4	5	6	7	8	9	Final
Nova Scotia (Radford) 🔨	2	0	0	0	0	1	0	0	1	4
Prince Edward Island (McInnis)	0	0	0	1	1	0	0	1	0	3

Sheet B	1	2	3	4	5	6	7	8	Final
Saskatchewan (Streifel)	0	1	0	2	1	0	1	0	5
Ontario (Rizzo) 🔨	1	0	2	0	0	3	0	2	8

Sheet C	1	2	3	4	5	6	7	8	Final
Quebec (Waddell) 🔨	0	0	5	0	1	1	1	X	8
Alberta (Ford-Johnston)	1	1	0	1	0	0	0	X	3

Sheet D	1	2	3	4	5	6	7	8	Final
Northern Ontario (Hoppe)	0	1	0	1	0	2	0	X	4
British Columbia (Gushulak) 🔨	1	0	3	0	1	0	2	X	7

===== Draw 15 =====
Thursday, December 5, 8:30 pm

Sheet E	1	2	3	4	5	6	7	8	Final
British Columbia (Gushulak)	0	0	1	1	0	0	0	0	2
Nova Scotia (Radford) 🔨	0	2	0	0	0	0	1	1	4

Sheet F	1	2	3	4	5	6	7	8	Final
Prince Edward Island (McInnis)	0	0	0	2	1	1	1	0	5
Saskatchewan (Streifel) 🔨	2	1	3	0	0	0	0	2	8

Sheet G	1	2	3	4	5	6	7	8	Final
Ontario (Rizzo) 🔨	2	0	2	0	1	0	2	1	8
Quebec (Waddell)	0	1	0	2	0	1	0	0	4

Sheet H	1	2	3	4	5	6	7	8	Final
Alberta (Ford-Johnston) 🔨	4	2	2	0	3	0	X	X	11
Northern Ontario (Hoppe)	0	0	0	1	0	1	X	X	2

===== Draw 16 =====
Friday, December 6, 10:00 am

Sheet A	1	2	3	4	5	6	7	8	Final
Saskatchewan (Streifel)	0	0	2	1	0	1	0	X	4
British Columbia (Gushulak) 🔨	0	4	0	0	1	0	4	X	9

Sheet B	1	2	3	4	5	6	7	8	Final
Nova Scotia (Radford)	0	1	0	0	1	2	0	X	4
Alberta (Ford-Johnston) 🔨	2	0	5	2	0	0	2	X	11

Sheet C	1	2	3	4	5	6	7	8	Final
Northern Ontario (Hoppe)	0	2	0	1	0	0	1	0	4
Ontario (Rizzo) 🔨	2	0	0	0	3	0	0	2	7

Sheet D	1	2	3	4	5	6	7	8	Final
Quebec (Waddell) 🔨	0	1	0	1	0	1	0	2	5
Prince Edward Island (McInnis)	1	0	0	0	2	0	1	0	4

===== Draw 18 =====
Friday, December 6, 6:00 pm

Sheet E	1	2	3	4	5	6	7	8	Final
Prince Edward Island (McInnis) 🔨	3	0	3	0	1	0	3	X	10
Northern Ontario (Hoppe)	0	1	0	2	0	1	0	X	4

Sheet F	1	2	3	4	5	6	7	8	Final
British Columbia (Gushulak) 🔨	0	0	1	0	1	0	0	1	3
Quebec (Waddell)	1	1	0	1	0	1	1	0	5

Sheet G	1	2	3	4	5	6	7	8	Final
Alberta (Ford-Johnston) 🔨	2	0	1	1	2	0	2	X	8
Saskatchewan (Streifel)	0	1	0	0	0	1	0	X	2

Sheet H	1	2	3	4	5	6	7	8	9	Final
Ontario (Rizzo) 🔨	1	1	0	2	0	1	0	1	1	7
Nova Scotia (Radford)	0	0	1	0	3	0	2	0	0	6

=== Playoffs ===
Semifinals
1	Ontario	6
4	Quebec	4
2	Alberta	6
3	Nova Scotia	3

Final
1	Ontario	4
2	Alberta	5
Bronze medal game
4	Quebec	5
3	Nova Scotia	7

==== Semifinals ====
Saturday, December 7, 8:30 am

Sheet A	1	2	3	4	5	6	7	8	Final
Alberta (Ford-Johnston) 🔨	1	1	0	0	3	0	1	X	6
Nova Scotia (Radford)	0	0	1	0	0	2	0	X	3

Sheet C	1	2	3	4	5	6	7	8	Final
Ontario (Rizzo)	2	0	2	0	0	1	1	X	6
Quebec (Waddell) 🔨	0	2	0	2	0	0	0	X	4

==== Bronze medal game ====
Saturday, December 7, 3:30 pm

Sheet D	1	2	3	4	5	6	7	8	Final
Quebec (Waddell)	0	1	0	2	1	0	0	1	5
Nova Scotia (Radford) 🔨	0	0	2	0	0	4	1	0	7

==== Gold medal game ====
Saturday, December 7, 3:30 pm

Sheet D	1	2	3	4	5	6	7	8	Final
Ontario (Rizzo) 🔨	0	0	0	0	0	2	1	1	4
Alberta (Ford-Johnston)	0	0	0	1	4	0	0	0	5

=== Final standings ===
Place	Team
1st place, gold medalist(s)	Alberta
2nd place, silver medalist(s)	Ontario
3rd place, bronze medalist(s)	Nova Scotia
4	Quebec
5	British Columbia
6	Saskatchewan
7	Prince Edward Island
8	Northern Ontario

Place	Team
9	Newfoundland and Labrador
10	New Brunswick
11	Northwest Territories
12	Manitoba
13	Yukon
14	Nunavut
