= Cori Morris =

Canadian curler and Olympic medalist

Corinne Morris
- Curler
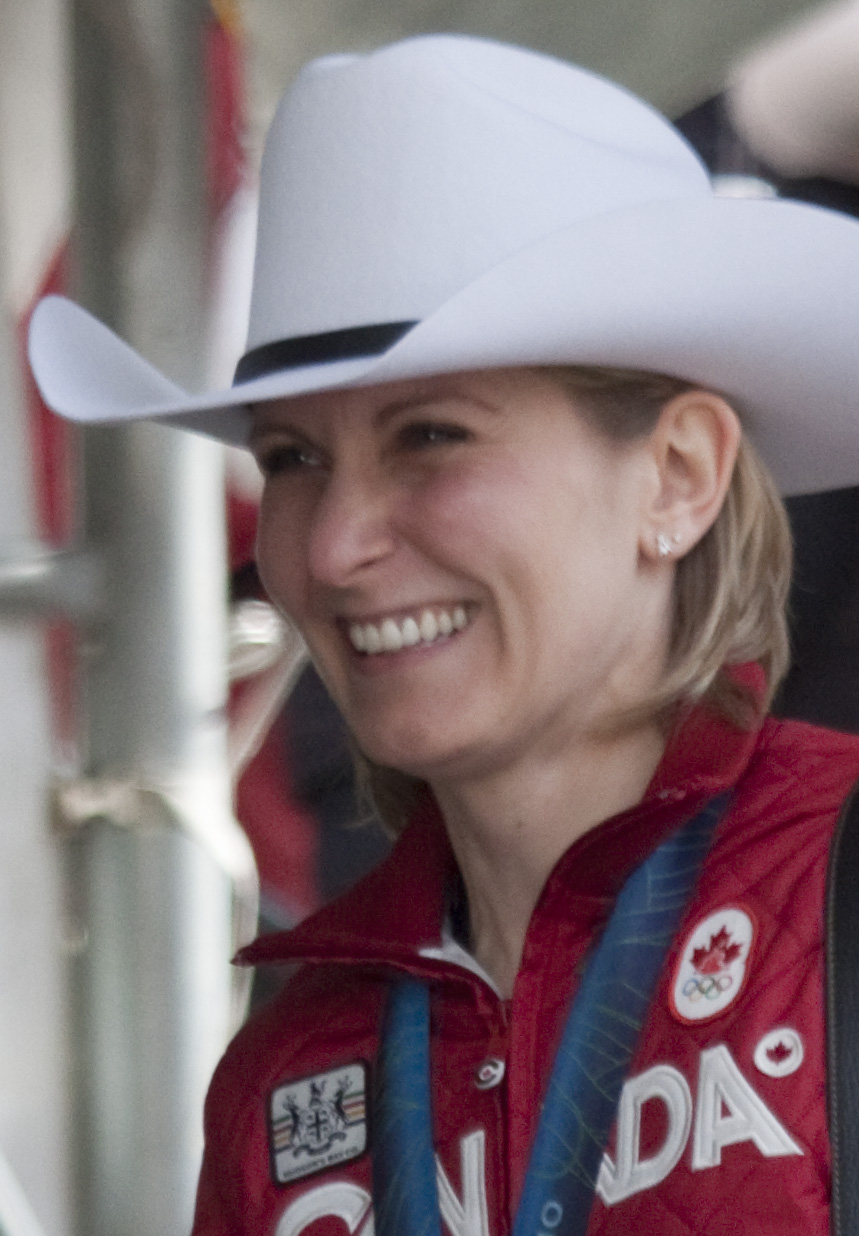
- Born: Corinne Bartel; June 21, 1971 (age 55); Humboldt, Saskatchewan

Team
- Curling club: Calgary CC, Calgary, AB
- Skip: Atina Ford-Johnston
- Third: Shannon Morris
- Second: Sheri Pickering
- Lead: Cori Morris

Curling career
- Member Association: Ontario (1997-1998); Alberta (2004-Present)
- Hearts: 3 (2007, 2009, 2013)
- Top CTRS ranking: 4th (2006–07, 2007–08, 2008–09)
- Grand Slam victories: 1 (Players': 2010)
Medal record
Women's curling
Representing Canada
Winter Olympics
Silver medal – second place	2010 Vancouver
World Senior Championships
Silver medal – second place	2025 Fredericton
Representing Alberta
Canadian Olympic Curling Trials
Gold medal – first place	2009 Edmonton

Corinne "Cori" Morris (born June 21, 1971 as Corinne Bartel) is a Canadian curler from Calgary, Alberta. She played lead for the Olympic silver medal-winning Cheryl Bernard rink from 2005 to 2011.

== Career ==
Morris grew up in Lanigan, Saskatchewan. In 1998, Morris played in Ontario, and played in the provincial Scott Tournament of Hearts, as an alternate player for the Cheryl McBain team. She later moved to Alberta. Morris joined Bernard in 2005 after playing for Heather Rankin. She went to the 2007 and 2009 Scotties Tournament of Hearts as a member of that team. At the 2009 Tournament of Hearts, Morris was presented with the Marj Mitchell Sportsmanship Award.

Morris and her team represented Canada in the 2010 Winter Olympics, and won silver medals at the tournament.

On February 8, 2011, it was announced that the Bernard team would disband at the end of the 2010–11 curling season. Morris joined a new team for the 2011–12 curling season, playing as lead under Dana Ferguson for one season. She currently coaches the Kayla Skrlik team and made her return to playing national-level curling at the 2024 Canadian Senior Curling Championships, playing as lead for the Atina Ford-Johnston rink, where they won 5–4 against Ontario's Jo-Ann Rizzo in the final, and will represent Canada at the 2025 World Senior Curling Championships.

== Personal life ==
Morris is a graduate from the University of Ottawa and is employed as a professional recruiter. She married 1994 World Junior Champion Sean Morris in 2010. She currently works as a Talent Acquisition Partner for ATB Financial.
