= 1990 Canadian Junior Curling Championships =

The 1990 Pepsi Canadian Junior Curling Championships were held March 24 to 31, 1990 at the Garson Arena in Garson, Ontario.

== Men's ==
=== Teams ===
Province / Territory	Skip	Third	Second	Lead
Yukon/Northwest Territories	Jeff MacPheat	Jim Chapman	David West	Trevor Dobbs
British Columbia	Jim Cotter	Nico Bakker	Ron Douglas	Brian Fisher
Alberta	Rob Schlender	Jeff Wieschorster	Paul Sorensen	Jason Stone
Saskatchewan	Jason Krupski	Dion Protzak	Matthew Krupski	Chad Herman
Manitoba	Lyall Hudson	Greg Romaniuk	Mike Mansell	Rod Guilford
Northern Ontario	John McClelland	Jamie Ash	Don Merriman	Jason Scott
Ontario	Noel Herron	Robert Brewer	Steve Small	Richard Polk
Quebec	Eric Sylvain	Guy Doyon	Joel Pouliot	Michel Gregoire
New Brunswick	Sean Hughson	Darrel Rice (skip)	Scott Jones	Shane Longley
Prince Edward Island	Sean Matheson	Brian Scales	Paul McCormack	Robbie Newson
Nova Scotia	Brian Fowlie	Steve Eddy	Dan Evans	George Kinsman
Newfoundland	Kenny Young	Mark Stonehouse	Scott Stonehouse	Jeff Morris

=== Standings ===
Locale	Skip	W	L
Ontario	Noel Herron	9	2
Manitoba	Lyall Hudson	8	3
Yukon/Northwest Territories	Jeff MacPheat	6	5
Quebec	Eric Sylvain	6	5
Saskatchewan	Jason Krupski	6	5
Nova Scotia	Brian Fowlie	6	5
British Columbia	Jim Cotter	6	5
Northern Ontario	John McClelland	5	6
Alberta	Rob Schlender	5	6
Prince Edward Island	Sean Matheson	4	7
New Brunswick	Darrel Rice	3	8
Newfoundland	Kenny Young	2	9

=== Results ===
==== Draw 1 ====
Sheet C	1	2	3	4	5	6	7	8	9	10	11	Final
Quebec (Sylvain) 🔨	2	0	0	0	2	1	1	1	0	0	1	8
British Columbia (Cotter)	0	1	2	0	0	0	0	0	3	1	0	7

Sheet F	1	2	3	4	5	6	7	8	9	10	Final
Prince Edward Island (Matheson) 🔨	0	0	1	0	0	0	0	0	1	X	2
Ontario (Herron)	1	2	0	0	2	1	0	0	0	X	6

==== Draw 2 ====
Sheet A	1	2	3	4	5	6	7	8	9	10	Final
Nova Scotia (Fowlie) 🔨	3	0	1	0	2	0	2	0	0	X	8
Northern Ontario (McClelland)	0	1	0	2	0	2	0	2	0	X	7

Sheet B	1	2	3	4	5	6	7	8	9	10	Final
Alberta (Schlender) 🔨	2	0	2	0	0	1	0	0	0	0	5
Yukon/Northwest Territories (MacPheat)	0	2	0	0	0	0	2	0	0	0	4

Sheet D	1	2	3	4	5	6	7	8	9	10	Final
Saskatchewan (Krupski) 🔨	0	0	1	0	0	0	0	0	0	2	3
Newfoundland (Young)	0	0	0	0	0	0	0	0	1	0	1

Sheet E	1	2	3	4	5	6	7	8	9	10	Final
Manitoba (Hudson) 🔨	2	0	0	1	1	0	1	0	0	2	7
New Brunswick (Rice)	0	0	1	0	0	1	0	1	1	0	4

==== Draw 3 ====
Sheet A	1	2	3	4	5	6	7	8	9	10	11	Final
Saskatchewan (Krupski) 🔨	0	2	0	2	0	0	0	1	0	0	0	5
Prince Edward Island (Matheson)	0	0	0	0	1	1	1	0	1	1	1	6

Sheet B	1	2	3	4	5	6	7	8	9	10	11	Final
New Brunswick (Rice) 🔨	1	0	1	0	0	0	0	2	0	1	1	6
Alberta (Schlender)	0	2	0	0	1	0	1	0	1	0	0	5

Sheet C	1	2	3	4	5	6	7	8	9	10	Final
Newfoundland (Young) 🔨	1	0	0	0	2	0	3	0	0	X	6
Yukon/Northwest Territories (MacPheat)	0	0	1	1	0	3	0	2	2	X	9

Sheet D	1	2	3	4	5	6	7	8	9	10	11	Final
British Columbia (Cotter) 🔨	0	3	0	1	0	0	0	1	0	1	1	7
Northern Ontario (McClelland)	1	0	1	0	0	0	2	0	2	0	0	6

Sheet E	1	2	3	4	5	6	7	8	9	10	Final
Ontario (Herron) 🔨	2	0	1	0	2	0	0	1	0	X	6
Manitoba (Hudson)	0	3	0	3	0	1	0	0	2	X	9

Sheet F	1	2	3	4	5	6	7	8	9	10	Final
Quebec (Sylvain) 🔨	0	3	0	2	0	2	0	1	0	1	9
Nova Scotia (Fowlie)	0	0	1	0	1	0	3	0	1	0	6

==== Draw 5 ====
Sheet A	1	2	3	4	5	6	7	8	9	10	Final
Manitoba (Hudson) 🔨	3	2	4	0	X	X	X	X	X	X	9
Alberta (Schlender)	0	0	0	1	X	X	X	X	X	X	1

Sheet B	1	2	3	4	5	6	7	8	9	10	Final
Yukon/Northwest Territories (MacPheat) 🔨	0	1	0	1	0	0	0	0	1	0	3
Saskatchewan (Krupski)	0	0	0	0	0	0	3	0	0	1	4

Sheet C	1	2	3	4	5	6	7	8	9	10	Final
New Brunswick (Rice) 🔨	3	1	5	0	X	X	X	X	X	X	9
Quebec (Sylvain)	0	0	0	1	X	X	X	X	X	X	1

Sheet D	1	2	3	4	5	6	7	8	9	10	Final
Nova Scotia (Fowlie) 🔨	0	1	0	0	1	0	0	1	0	0	3
Ontario (Herron)	0	0	0	1	0	1	1	0	0	2	5

Sheet E	1	2	3	4	5	6	7	8	9	10	Final
Northern Ontario (McClelland) 🔨	0	2	1	0	0	0	0	1	1	X	5
Prince Edward Island (Matheson)	0	0	0	2	0	0	1	0	0	X	3

Sheet F	1	2	3	4	5	6	7	8	9	10	Final
British Columbia (Cotter) 🔨	0	0	1	2	1	0	0	0	1	1	6
Newfoundland (Young)	0	0	0	0	0	2	1	0	0	0	3

==== Draw 7 ====
Sheet A	1	2	3	4	5	6	7	8	9	10	Final
Prince Edward Island (Matheson) 🔨	1	0	0	2	3	0	0	0	1	X	7
Yukon/Northwest Territories (MacPheat)	0	1	0	0	0	2	0	1	0	X	4

Sheet D	1	2	3	4	5	6	7	8	9	10	Final
Ontario (Herron) 🔨	1	1	0	2	1	0	0	1	1	X	7
British Columbia (Cotter)	0	0	0	0	0	1	0	0	0	X	1

Sheet F	1	2	3	4	5	6	7	8	9	10	Final
Alberta (Schlender) 🔨	0	0	2	0	1	3	0	0	0	0	6
Quebec (Sylvain)	0	1	0	3	0	0	1	1	0	1	7

==== Draw 8 ====
Sheet B	1	2	3	4	5	6	7	8	9	10	Final
Northern Ontario (McClelland) 🔨	0	0	2	0	3	0	4	0	1	0	10
New Brunswick (Rice)	2	0	0	2	0	3	0	2	0	3	12

Sheet C	1	2	3	4	5	6	7	8	9	10	Final
Manitoba (Hudson) 🔨	0	2	0	1	1	0	0	1	0	X	5
Saskatchewan (Krupski)	0	0	1	0	0	2	0	0	0	X	3

Sheet E	1	2	3	4	5	6	7	8	9	10	Final
Nova Scotia (Fowlie) 🔨	0	2	2	0	0	0	2	0	0	2	8
Newfoundland (Young)	1	0	0	1	1	0	0	0	2	0	5

==== Draw 9 ====
Sheet A	1	2	3	4	5	6	7	8	9	10	Final
Quebec (Sylvain) 🔨	2	0	0	1	0	0	1	0	0	X	4
Ontario (Herron)	0	3	2	0	2	1	0	0	1	X	9

Sheet C	1	2	3	4	5	6	7	8	9	10	Final
Prince Edward Island (Matheson) 🔨	0	0	0	0	X	X	X	X	X	X	0
Alberta (Schlender)	4	1	1	1	X	X	X	X	X	X	7

Sheet E	1	2	3	4	5	6	7	8	9	10	Final
British Columbia (Cotter) 🔨	1	0	0	2	1	0	0	2	0	0	6
Yukon/Northwest Territories (MacPheat)	0	0	3	0	0	0	2	0	2	1	8

==== Draw 10 ====
Sheet B	1	2	3	4	5	6	7	8	9	10	Final
Newfoundland (Young) 🔨	1	0	0	1	0	0	0	1	0	0	3
Manitoba (Hudson)	0	2	2	0	0	0	1	0	1	1	7

Sheet D	1	2	3	4	5	6	7	8	9	10	Final
New Brunswick (Rice) 🔨	0	1	0	0	0	2	0	0	1	X	4
Nova Scotia (Fowlie)	2	0	0	4	1	0	0	1	0	X	8

Sheet F	1	2	3	4	5	6	7	8	9	10	11	Final
Saskatchewan (Krupski) 🔨	0	4	0	1	0	0	0	1	0	0	1	7
Northern Ontario (McClelland)	1	0	0	0	0	3	0	0	1	1	0	6

==== Draw 11 ====
Sheet B	1	2	3	4	5	6	7	8	9	10	11	Final
Saskatchewan (Krupski) 🔨	1	0	0	1	0	1	0	2	0	0	1	6
Nova Scotia (Fowlie)	0	0	0	0	2	0	1	0	0	2	0	5

Sheet D	1	2	3	4	5	6	7	8	9	10	Final
Northern Ontario (McClelland) 🔨	0	1	0	0	2	0	0	0	0	3	6
Manitoba (Hudson)	0	0	1	0	0	1	1	0	1	0	4

Sheet F	1	2	3	4	5	6	7	8	9	10	Final
Newfoundland (Young) 🔨	1	0	1	0	0	0	3	1	1	X	7
New Brunswick (Rice)	0	2	0	0	2	0	0	0	0	X	4

==== Draw 12 ====
Sheet A	1	2	3	4	5	6	7	8	9	10	Final
Alberta (Schlender) 🔨	0	1	2	0	1	0	1	0	0	0	5
British Columbia (Cotter)	1	0	0	1	0	0	0	1	1	0	4

Sheet C	1	2	3	4	5	6	7	8	9	10	Final
Yukon/Northwest Territories (MacPheat) 🔨	0	2	0	0	1	0	0	0	0	0	3
Ontario (Herron)	0	0	0	0	0	1	1	0	2	1	5

Sheet E	1	2	3	4	5	6	7	8	9	10	Final
Prince Edward Island (Matheson) 🔨	1	0	2	2	1	0	1	0	1	X	8
Quebec (Sylvain)	0	0	0	0	0	2	0	2	0	X	4

==== Draw 13 ====
Sheet A	1	2	3	4	5	6	7	8	9	10	Final
New Brunswick (Rice) 🔨	0	0	1	2	0	1	0	1	0	0	5
Saskatchewan (Krupski)	0	1	0	0	3	0	1	0	1	1	7

Sheet C	1	2	3	4	5	6	7	8	9	10	Final
Northern Ontario (McClelland) 🔨	0	2	0	0	1	0	0	1	0	2	6
Newfoundland (Young)	0	0	2	0	0	0	1	0	2	0	5

Sheet F	1	2	3	4	5	6	7	8	9	10	Final
Nova Scotia (Fowlie) 🔨	1	0	0	0	1	0	0	0	0	X	2
Manitoba (Hudson)	0	1	0	1	0	1	1	1	0	X	5

==== Draw 14 ====
Sheet B	1	2	3	4	5	6	7	8	9	10	Final
British Columbia (Cotter) 🔨	0	2	3	0	0	2	0	2	X	X	9
Prince Edward Island (Matheson)	0	0	0	1	0	0	1	0	X	X	2

Sheet D	1	2	3	4	5	6	7	8	9	10	Final
Yukon/Northwest Territories (MacPheat) 🔨	0	1	1	0	0	2	1	0	4	X	9
Quebec (Sylvain)	0	0	0	0	1	0	0	1	0	X	2

Sheet E	1	2	3	4	5	6	7	8	9	10	Final
Alberta (Schlender) 🔨	3	0	2	0	1	0	1	0	2	X	9
Ontario (Herron)	0	0	0	1	0	1	0	2	0	X	4

==== Draw 16 ====
Sheet A	1	2	3	4	5	6	7	8	9	10	Final
New Brunswick (Rice) 🔨	3	0	1	0	2	0	0	0	0	0	6
British Columbia (Cotter)	0	3	0	1	0	0	2	0	0	1	7

Sheet B	1	2	3	4	5	6	7	8	9	10	Final
Ontario (Herron) 🔨	3	1	0	0	0	0	2	0	1	X	7
Newfoundland (Young)	0	0	0	1	1	0	0	0	0	X	2

Sheet C	1	2	3	4	5	6	7	8	9	10	11	Final
Nova Scotia (Fowlie) 🔨	0	1	0	0	2	0	1	1	0	0	1	6
Prince Edward Island (Matheson)	1	0	1	1	0	0	0	0	1	1	0	5

Sheet D	1	2	3	4	5	6	7	8	9	10	11	Final
Manitoba (Hudson) 🔨	0	0	0	1	0	0	2	1	0	2	0	6
Yukon/Northwest Territories (MacPheat)	0	0	2	0	1	1	0	0	2	0	2	8

Sheet E	1	2	3	4	5	6	7	8	9	10	Final
Quebec (Sylvain) 🔨	1	0	1	0	0	1	0	0	3	0	6
Saskatchewan (Krupski)	0	1	0	0	2	0	0	1	0	1	5

Sheet F	1	2	3	4	5	6	7	8	9	10	Final
Northern Ontario (McClelland) 🔨	0	0	0	1	1	0	0	2	0	1	5
Alberta (Schlender)	0	0	0	0	0	2	1	0	1	0	4

==== Draw 18 ====
Sheet A	1	2	3	4	5	6	7	8	9	10	Final
Yukon/Northwest Territories (MacPheat) 🔨	2	0	2	0	3	0	X	X	X	X	7
Nova Scotia (Fowlie)	0	2	0	1	0	1	X	X	X	X	4

Sheet B	1	2	3	4	5	6	7	8	9	10	Final
Quebec (Sylvain) 🔨	0	0	2	1	0	1	0	2	0	1	7
Northern Ontario (McClelland)	0	0	0	0	2	0	1	0	2	0	5

Sheet C	1	2	3	4	5	6	7	8	9	10	Final
British Columbia (Cotter) 🔨	1	0	3	0	2	0	0	1	0	X	7
Manitoba (Hudson)	0	1	0	1	0	2	1	0	0	X	5

Sheet D	1	2	3	4	5	6	7	8	9	10	Final
Prince Edward Island (Matheson) 🔨	3	0	2	0	0	2	2	0	0	X	9
New Brunswick (Rice)	0	1	0	0	1	0	0	2	1	X	5

Sheet E	1	2	3	4	5	6	7	8	9	10	11	Final
Newfoundland (Young) 🔨	1	0	1	2	1	0	0	1	0	1	0	7
Alberta (Schlender)	0	2	0	0	0	3	1	0	1	0	1	8

Sheet F	1	2	3	4	5	6	7	8	9	10	Final
Ontario (Herron) 🔨	0	2	0	0	0	1	0	1	1	2	7
Saskatchewan (Krupski)	0	0	2	1	0	0	1	0	0	0	4

==== Draw 19 ====
Sheet A	1	2	3	4	5	6	7	8	9	10	Final
Northern Ontario (McClelland) 🔨	1	0	0	0	1	0	1	0	1	X	4
Ontario (Herron)	0	1	2	2	0	1	0	1	0	X	7

Sheet B	1	2	3	4	5	6	7	8	9	10	Final
Manitoba (Hudson) 🔨	0	0	2	0	2	0	0	3	0	X	7
Quebec (Sylvain)	0	1	0	1	0	0	1	0	1	X	4

Sheet C	1	2	3	4	5	6	7	8	9	10	11	12	Final
Alberta (Schlender) 🔨	0	3	0	1	0	0	3	0	1	0	0	0	8
Nova Scotia (Fowlie)	0	0	2	0	0	2	0	2	0	2	0	1	9

Sheet D	1	2	3	4	5	6	7	8	9	10	Final
Newfoundland (Young) 🔨	1	1	1	0	1	0	3	0	X	X	7
Prince Edward Island (Matheson)	0	0	0	0	0	1	0	0	X	X	1

Sheet E	1	2	3	4	5	6	7	8	9	10	Final
Saskatchewan (Krupski) 🔨	0	2	0	0	0	0	0	0	2	0	4
British Columbia (Cotter)	0	0	0	0	1	1	1	0	0	2	5

Sheet F	1	2	3	4	5	6	7	8	9	10	Final
New Brunswick (Rice) 🔨	1	0	0	1	0	1	0	1	0	X	4
Yukon/Northwest Territories (MacPheat)	0	1	1	0	0	0	1	0	4	X	7

==== Draw 21 ====
Sheet A	1	2	3	4	5	6	7	8	9	10	Final
Quebec (Sylvain) 🔨	4	0	0	0	0	0	0	1	2	X	7
Newfoundland (Young)	0	0	3	0	0	1	0	0	0	X	4

Sheet B	1	2	3	4	5	6	7	8	9	10	Final
Nova Scotia (Fowlie) 🔨	2	0	2	0	2	0	3	0	1	X	10
British Columbia (Cotter)	0	1	0	1	0	1	0	2	0	X	5

Sheet C	1	2	3	4	5	6	7	8	9	10	Final
Ontario (Herron) 🔨	1	3	1	0	0	1	0	0	1	X	7
New Brunswick (Rice)	0	0	0	0	2	0	2	0	0	X	4

Sheet D	1	2	3	4	5	6	7	8	9	10	Final
Saskatchewan (Krupski) 🔨	2	1	0	0	0	1	0	3	0	X	7
Alberta (Schlender)	0	0	1	1	1	0	1	0	0	X	4

Sheet E	1	2	3	4	5	6	7	8	9	10	Final
Yukon/Northwest Territories (MacPheat) 🔨	0	0	1	0	2	0	1	0	0	X	4
Northern Ontario (McClelland)	1	1	0	1	0	2	0	0	1	X	6

Sheet F	1	2	3	4	5	6	7	8	9	10	Final
Manitoba (Hudson) 🔨	0	1	0	1	0	0	0	4	0	X	6
Prince Edward Island (Matheson)	0	0	2	0	0	0	2	0	0	X	4

=== Tiebreakers ===
==== Tiebreaker #1 ====
Sheet B	1	2	3	4	5	6	7	8	9	10	Final
Nova Scotia (Fowlie) 🔨	2	0	0	0	0	3	0	1	0	X	6
British Columbia (Cotter)	0	0	0	1	1	0	1	0	0	X	3

Player percentages
Nova Scotia		British Columbia	
George Kinsman	73%	Brian Fisher	68%
Dan Evans	88%	Ron Douglas	80%
Steve Eddy	76%	Nico Bakker	71%
Brian Fowlie	78%	Jim Cotter	78%
Total	79%	Total	74%

==== Tiebreaker #2 ====
Sheet C	1	2	3	4	5	6	7	8	9	10	Final
Nova Scotia (Fowlie) 🔨	0	2	0	1	2	0	0	0	0	X	5
Yukon/Northwest Territories (MacPheat)	0	0	1	0	0	0	0	1	1	X	3

Player percentages
Nova Scotia		Yukon/Northwest Territories	
George Kinsman	84%	Trevor Dobbs	85%
Dan Evans	69%	Craig Swayne	66%
Steve Eddy	64%	Jim Chapman	70%
Brian Fowlie	74%	Jeff MacPheat	65%
Total	72%	Total	72%

Sheet D	1	2	3	4	5	6	7	8	9	10	Final
Quebec (Sylvain)	0	0	0	1	0	0	2	0	1	0	4
Saskatchewan (Krupski) 🔨	1	1	1	0	2	0	0	0	0	1	6

Player percentages
Quebec		Saskatchewan	
Michel Gregoire	96%	Chad Herman	65%
Joel Pouliot	68%	Matthew Krupski	55%
Guy Doyon	85%	Dion Protzak	86%
Eric Sylvain	63%	Jason Krupski	81%
Total	78%	Total	72%

==== Tiebreaker #3 ====
Sheet B	1	2	3	4	5	6	7	8	9	10	Final
Nova Scotia (Fowlie)	0	1	1	0	0	0	0	0	X	X	2
Saskatchewan (Krupski) 🔨	2	0	0	0	1	2	1	2	X	X	8

Player percentages
Nova Scotia		Saskatchewan	
George Kinsman	72%	Chad Herman	65%
Dan Evans	83%	Matthew Krupski	72%
Steve Eddy	75%	Dion Protzak	58%
Brian Fowlie	53%	Jason Krupski	82%
Total	71%	Total	69%

=== Playoffs ===
Semifinal		Final
Manitoba	6
Saskatchewan	5	Manitoba	7
		Ontario	8

==== Semifinal ====
Sheet D	1	2	3	4	5	6	7	8	9	10	11	Final
Manitoba (Hudson) 🔨	0	0	2	0	1	0	0	1	0	1	1	6
Saskatchewan (Krupski)	0	0	0	3	0	0	1	0	1	0	0	5

Player percentages
Manitoba		Saskatchewan	
Rod Guilford	90%	Chad Herman	76%
Mike Mansell	81%	Matthew Krupski	69%
Greg Romaniuk	75%	Dion Protzak	80%
Lyall Hudson	94%	Jason Krupski	78%
Total	85%	Total	76%

==== Final ====
Sheet C	1	2	3	4	5	6	7	8	9	10	11	Final
Manitoba (Hudson)	0	1	0	0	1	0	3	0	1	1	0	7
Ontario (Herron) 🔨	2	0	1	2	0	1	0	1	0	0	1	8

Player percentages
Manitoba		Ontario	
Rod Guilford	89%	Richard Polk	48%
Mike Mansell	84%	Steve Small	75%
Greg Romaniuk	76%	Robert Brewer	82%
Lyall Hudson	84%	Noel Herron	83%
Total	83%	Total	72%

== Women's ==
=== Teams ===
Province / Territory	Skip	Third	Second	Lead
Northwest Territories/Yukon	Michelle Delorey	Pamela King	Monique Delorey	Heather McCagg
British Columbia	Janet Tupper	Stephanie Whittaker	Heather Mockford	Grace MacInnes
Alberta	Renee Handfield	Nicole Handfield	Joanne Goudreau	Renee Bussiere
Saskatchewan	Atina Ford	Darlene Kidd	Leslie Beck	Cindy Ford
Manitoba	Nancy Malanchuk	Raili Walker	Jill Ursel	Natalie Claude
Ontario	Nathalie Hoffman	Nathalie Lascelles	Marie-Josee Carrier	Christine Timbers
Quebec	Tracey Knox	Lisa Tycholaz (skip)	Connie Cote	Pam Hunt
New Brunswick	Krista Smith	Heather Smith	Denise Cormier	Susanne LeBlanc
Prince Edward Island	Shelly Danks	Pamela MacCallum	Tricia MacGregor	Vanessa MacCallum
Nova Scotia	Judy MacKay	Kathy Lowther	Susan Lowther	Trish MacKay
Newfoundland	Debbie Barker	Lisa Buckle	Natasha Kennedy	Janice Gillingham

=== Standings ===
Locale	Skip	W	L
Manitoba	Nancy Malanchuk	9	1
Saskatchewan	Atina Ford	8	2
British Columbia	Janet Tupper	8	2
Ontario	Nathalie Hoffman	7	3
New Brunswick	Krista Smith	5	5
Alberta	Renee Handfield	4	6
Quebec	Lisa Tycholaz	4	6
Nova Scotia	Judy MacKay	4	6
Prince Edward Island	Shelly Danks	3	7
Northwest Territories/Yukon	Michelle Delorey	2	8
Newfoundland	Debbie Barker	1	9

=== Results ===
==== Draw 1 ====
Sheet B	1	2	3	4	5	6	7	8	9	10	Final
Alberta (Handfield) 🔨	1	4	0	1	1	0	4	X	X	X	11
Northwest Territories/Yukon (Delorey)	0	0	1	0	0	2	0	X	X	X	3

Sheet D	1	2	3	4	5	6	7	8	9	10	Final
Saskatchewan (Ford) 🔨	0	2	1	0	2	0	2	4	X	X	11
Newfoundland (Barker)	0	0	0	0	0	0	0	0	X	X	0

Sheet E	1	2	3	4	5	6	7	8	9	10	Final
New Brunswick (Smith) 🔨	1	0	0	1	0	0	1	0	1	0	4
Manitoba (Malanchuk)	0	1	0	0	2	1	0	0	0	1	5

==== Draw 2 ====
Sheet C	1	2	3	4	5	6	7	8	9	10	Final
Quebec (Tycholaz) 🔨	1	0	0	1	0	1	0	2	0	X	5
British Columbia (Tupper)	0	1	2	0	1	0	1	0	2	X	7

Sheet F	1	2	3	4	5	6	7	8	9	10	11	Final
Prince Edward Island (Danks) 🔨	1	0	0	1	0	0	1	0	0	1	0	4
Ontario (Hoffman)	0	0	1	0	0	1	0	1	1	0	2	6

==== Draw 4 ====
Sheet A	1	2	3	4	5	6	7	8	9	10	Final
Saskatchewan (Ford) 🔨	0	0	0	0	2	0	0	4	1	X	7
Prince Edward Island (Danks)	0	0	0	1	0	1	0	0	0	X	2

Sheet B	1	2	3	4	5	6	7	8	9	10	Final
New Brunswick (Smith) 🔨	1	0	0	2	0	2	0	0	2	X	7
Alberta (Handfield)	0	0	2	0	1	0	0	1	0	X	4

Sheet C	1	2	3	4	5	6	7	8	9	10	Final
Northwest Territories/Yukon (Delorey) 🔨	0	2	1	0	3	0	4	0	0	X	10
Newfoundland (Barker)	0	0	0	1	0	1	0	1	1	X	4

Sheet E	1	2	3	4	5	6	7	8	9	10	Final
Ontario (Hoffman) 🔨	0	0	1	0	0	0	1	0	0	X	2
Manitoba (Malanchuk)	2	1	0	0	1	0	0	1	1	X	6

Sheet F	1	2	3	4	5	6	7	8	9	10	Final
Quebec (Tycholaz) 🔨	0	1	0	0	1	0	1	0	3	X	6
Nova Scotia (MacKay)	2	0	2	2	0	0	0	2	0	X	8

==== Draw 6 ====
Sheet A	1	2	3	4	5	6	7	8	9	10	Final
Manitoba (Malanchuk) 🔨	0	1	0	0	1	1	0	3	2	X	8
Alberta (Handfield)	1	0	1	0	0	0	1	0	0	X	3

Sheet B	1	2	3	4	5	6	7	8	9	10	Final
Northwest Territories/Yukon (Delorey) 🔨	0	0	0	1	0	0	0	1	0	X	2
Saskatchewan (Ford)	0	1	0	0	0	0	1	0	3	X	5

Sheet C	1	2	3	4	5	6	7	8	9	10	Final
New Brunswick (Smith) 🔨	1	0	2	3	0	2	0	0	0	0	8
Quebec (Tycholaz)	0	0	0	0	2	0	1	1	3	0	7

Sheet D	1	2	3	4	5	6	7	8	9	10	Final
Nova Scotia (MacKay) 🔨	0	1	1	0	1	0	1	0	1	X	5
Ontario (Hoffman)	1	0	0	2	0	3	0	3	0	X	9

Sheet F	1	2	3	4	5	6	7	8	9	10	Final
British Columbia (Tupper) 🔨	2	0	2	1	2	0	1	2	X	X	10
Newfoundland (Barker)	0	1	0	0	0	1	0	0	X	X	2

==== Draw 7 ====
Sheet C	1	2	3	4	5	6	7	8	9	10	Final
Manitoba (Malanchuk) 🔨	0	0	0	0	2	0	1	0	2	0	5
Saskatchewan (Ford)	0	0	1	1	0	2	0	1	0	4	9

Sheet E	1	2	3	4	5	6	7	8	9	10	Final
Newfoundland (Barker) 🔨	1	0	0	0	0	0	1	0	1	X	3
Nova Scotia (MacKay)	0	1	0	2	1	1	0	1	0	X	6

==== Draw 8 ====
Sheet A	1	2	3	4	5	6	7	8	9	10	Final
Northwest Territories/Yukon (Delorey) 🔨	0	0	0	3	0	0	0	1	1	X	5
Prince Edward Island (Danks)	1	1	1	0	0	3	1	0	0	X	7

Sheet D	1	2	3	4	5	6	7	8	9	10	Final
Ontario (Hoffman) 🔨	0	1	0	0	1	0	0	0	2	0	4
British Columbia (Tupper)	0	0	1	0	0	1	0	0	0	3	5

Sheet F	1	2	3	4	5	6	7	8	9	10	Final
Alberta (Handfield) 🔨	2	2	0	2	0	0	0	0	0	0	6
Quebec (Tycholaz)	0	0	4	0	1	1	0	1	0	3	10

==== Draw 9 ====
Sheet B	1	2	3	4	5	6	7	8	9	10	Final
Newfoundland (Barker) 🔨	0	2	0	0	0	0	1	0	X	X	3
Manitoba (Malanchuk)	0	0	1	2	1	4	0	1	X	X	9

Sheet D	1	2	3	4	5	6	7	8	9	10	Final
New Brunswick (Smith) 🔨	0	1	0	1	1	0	0	1	0	X	4
Nova Scotia (MacKay)	0	0	3	0	0	2	1	0	1	X	7

==== Draw 10 ====
Sheet A	1	2	3	4	5	6	7	8	9	10	11	Final
Ontario (Hoffman) 🔨	1	0	0	2	0	1	2	0	1	1	1	9
Quebec (Tycholaz)	0	2	2	0	2	0	0	2	0	0	0	8

Sheet C	1	2	3	4	5	6	7	8	9	10	Final
Prince Edward Island (Danks) 🔨	0	3	0	1	0	0	X	X	X	X	4
Alberta (Handfield)	2	0	4	0	3	2	X	X	X	X	11

Sheet E	1	2	3	4	5	6	7	8	9	10	Final
British Columbia (Tupper) 🔨	1	2	0	0	1	2	0	0	2	X	8
Northwest Territories/Yukon (Delorey)	0	0	1	1	0	0	1	1	0	X	4

==== Draw 11 ====
Sheet A	1	2	3	4	5	6	7	8	9	10	Final
Alberta (Handfield) 🔨	0	2	1	0	0	2	0	0	0	0	5
British Columbia (Tupper)	0	0	0	0	2	0	1	1	1	1	6

Sheet C	1	2	3	4	5	6	7	8	9	10	11	Final
Northwest Territories/Yukon (Delorey) 🔨	0	1	1	0	0	0	1	0	2	0	0	5
Ontario (Hoffman)	0	0	0	1	1	0	0	3	0	0	1	6

Sheet E	1	2	3	4	5	6	7	8	9	10	Final
Prince Edward Island (Danks) 🔨	2	0	0	0	1	0	2	1	0	0	6
Quebec (Tycholaz)	0	2	0	1	0	1	0	0	1	2	7

==== Draw 12 ====
Sheet B	1	2	3	4	5	6	7	8	9	10	Final
Saskatchewan (Ford) 🔨	0	1	0	0	4	0	2	0	0	X	7
Nova Scotia (MacKay)	0	0	2	1	0	1	0	0	1	X	5

Sheet F	1	2	3	4	5	6	7	8	9	10	Final
Newfoundland (Barker) 🔨	0	0	0	0	1	0	0	1	0	X	2
New Brunswick (Smith)	0	0	2	1	0	1	1	0	4	X	9

==== Draw 13 ====
Sheet B	1	2	3	4	5	6	7	8	9	10	11	Final
British Columbia (Tupper) 🔨	2	0	0	1	4	0	1	0	1	0	1	10
Prince Edward Island (Danks)	0	2	1	0	0	3	0	0	0	3	0	9

Sheet D	1	2	3	4	5	6	7	8	9	10	Final
Quebec (Tycholaz) 🔨	2	1	0	1	0	4	2	0	X	X	10
Northwest Territories/Yukon (Delorey)	0	0	2	0	2	0	0	1	X	X	5

Sheet E	1	2	3	4	5	6	7	8	9	10	Final
Alberta (Handfield) 🔨	1	1	0	2	0	0	1	2	0	X	7
Ontario (Hoffman)	0	0	1	0	0	0	0	0	1	X	2

==== Draw 14 ====
Sheet A	1	2	3	4	5	6	7	8	9	10	Final
New Brunswick (Smith) 🔨	1	1	0	0	1	0	3	0	0	X	6
Saskatchewan (Ford)	0	0	2	1	0	0	0	0	0	X	3

Sheet F	1	2	3	4	5	6	7	8	9	10	11	Final
Nova Scotia (MacKay) 🔨	1	1	0	1	0	0	0	0	0	1	0	4
Manitoba (Malanchuk)	0	0	2	0	0	0	1	0	1	0	1	5

==== Draw 15 ====
Sheet A	1	2	3	4	5	6	7	8	9	10	Final
British Columbia (Tupper) 🔨	0	2	1	1	3	1	0	0	0	X	8
New Brunswick (Smith)	1	0	0	0	0	0	1	1	1	X	4

Sheet B	1	2	3	4	5	6	7	8	9	10	Final
Ontario (Hoffman) 🔨	0	0	2	1	1	1	2	0	1	X	8
Newfoundland (Barker)	0	0	0	0	0	0	0	3	0	X	3

Sheet C	1	2	3	4	5	6	7	8	9	10	Final
Nova Scotia (MacKay) 🔨	1	0	0	1	0	2	0	0	1	1	6
Prince Edward Island (Danks)	0	1	1	0	1	0	1	0	0	0	4

Sheet D	1	2	3	4	5	6	7	8	9	10	Final
Manitoba (Malanchuk) 🔨	2	0	1	0	3	1	0	3	X	X	10
Northwest Territories/Yukon (Delorey)	0	1	0	2	0	0	0	0	X	X	3

Sheet E	1	2	3	4	5	6	7	8	9	10	Final
Quebec (Tycholaz) 🔨	1	0	0	0	1	1	0	0	X	X	3
Saskatchewan (Ford)	0	2	3	3	0	0	0	1	X	X	9

==== Draw 17 ====
Sheet A	1	2	3	4	5	6	7	8	9	10	Final
Northwest Territories/Yukon (Delorey) 🔨	1	0	1	0	1	0	0	1	2	X	6
Nova Scotia (MacKay)	0	1	0	2	0	0	1	0	0	X	4

Sheet C	1	2	3	4	5	6	7	8	9	10	Final
British Columbia (Tupper) 🔨	0	0	0	0	0	2	0	2	0	X	4
Manitoba (Malanchuk)	1	0	1	1	0	0	2	0	2	X	7

Sheet D	1	2	3	4	5	6	7	8	9	10	Final
Prince Edward Island (Danks) 🔨	1	0	3	1	0	0	0	1	0	2	8
New Brunswick (Smith)	0	3	0	0	0	0	1	0	1	0	5

Sheet E	1	2	3	4	5	6	7	8	9	10	Final
Newfoundland (Barker) 🔨	2	0	0	2	0	2	0	1	0	1	8
Alberta (Handfield)	0	2	1	0	2	0	1	0	1	0	7

Sheet F	1	2	3	4	5	6	7	8	9	10	Final
Saskatchewan (Ford) 🔨	1	0	1	0	0	0	0	2	1	1	6
Ontario (Hoffman)	0	2	0	0	3	1	1	0	0	0	7

==== Draw 20 ====
Sheet B	1	2	3	4	5	6	7	8	9	10	Final
Manitoba (Malanchuk) 🔨	4	3	1	0	2	X	X	X	X	X	10
Quebec (Tycholaz)	0	0	0	1	0	X	X	X	X	X	1

Sheet C	1	2	3	4	5	6	7	8	9	10	Final
Nova Scotia (MacKay) 🔨	0	0	0	0	0	0	2	1	0	X	3
Alberta (Handfield)	1	1	1	1	1	1	0	0	0	X	6

Sheet D	1	2	3	4	5	6	7	8	9	10	Final
Newfoundland (Barker) 🔨	0	0	2	0	1	1	0	0	1	X	5
Prince Edward Island (Danks)	1	2	0	3	0	0	1	1	0	X	8

Sheet E	1	2	3	4	5	6	7	8	9	10	Final
Saskatchewan (Ford) 🔨	1	1	2	1	0	0	1	0	2	X	8
British Columbia (Tupper)	0	0	0	0	2	0	0	2	0	X	4

Sheet F	1	2	3	4	5	6	7	8	9	10	Final
New Brunswick (Smith) 🔨	0	3	0	3	4	X	X	X	X	X	10
Northwest Territories/Yukon (Delorey)	0	0	1	0	0	X	X	X	X	X	1

==== Draw 22 ====
Sheet A	1	2	3	4	5	6	7	8	9	10	Final
Newfoundland (Barker) 🔨	0	1	0	0	0	2	0	3	1	0	7
Quebec (Tycholaz)	0	0	2	1	2	0	2	0	0	2	9

Sheet B	1	2	3	4	5	6	7	8	9	10	11	Final
Nova Scotia (MacKay) 🔨	0	0	2	0	1	1	0	0	0	2	0	6
British Columbia (Tupper)	1	1	0	1	0	0	1	1	1	0	1	7

Sheet D	1	2	3	4	5	6	7	8	9	10	Final
Alberta (Handfield) 🔨	1	0	1	0	0	1	0	1	0	X	4
Saskatchewan (Ford)	0	1	0	0	4	0	1	0	2	X	8

Sheet E	1	2	3	4	5	6	7	8	9	10	Final
Ontario (Hoffman) 🔨	0	0	0	1	1	1	0	1	0	X	4
New Brunswick (Smith)	1	0	0	0	0	0	1	0	0	X	2

Sheet F	1	2	3	4	5	6	7	8	9	10	Final
Manitoba (Malanchuk) 🔨	1	0	2	0	2	1	0	2	X	X	8
Prince Edward Island (Danks)	0	1	0	0	0	0	1	0	X	X	2

=== Playoffs ===
Semifinal		Final
Saskatchewan	9
British Columbia	3	Manitoba	3
		Saskatchewan	5

==== Semifinal ====
Sheet C	1	2	3	4	5	6	7	8	9	10	Final
Saskatchewan (Ford)	1	2	1	0	2	0	0	2	1	X	9
British Columbia (Tupper) 🔨	0	0	0	1	0	2	0	0	0	X	3

Player percentages
Saskatchewan		British Columbia	
Cindy Ford	65%	Grace MacInnes	94%
Leslie Beck	73%	Heather Mockford	80%
Darlene Kidd	75%	Stephanie Whittaker	82%
Atina Ford	68%	Janet Tupper	57%
Total	70%	Total	79%

==== Final ====
Sheet D	1	2	3	4	5	6	7	8	9	10	Final
Manitoba (Malanchuk) 🔨	0	0	0	1	0	0	0	0	2	0	3
Saskatchewan (Ford)	0	2	0	0	0	2	0	0	0	1	5

Player percentages
Manitoba		Saskatchewan	
Natalie Claude	90%	Cindy Ford	75%
Jill Ursel	78%	Leslie Beck	71%
Raili Walker	69%	Darlene Kidd	74%
Nancy Malanchuk	66%	Atina Ford	74%
Total	76%	Total	73%
