= Atina =

Atina may refer to:

== Places ==
Greece

- Atina, Greece, a Turkish name for the City of Athens, Attica

Italy

- Atina, Lazio, a comune in the Province of Frosinone
- Atina, Basilicata, an ancient town near modern Elena, Basilicata

Turkey

- Atina, a Laz and Georgian name for Pazar (Greek: Athína), a district in Rize Province

== See also ==
- Atina (given name)
