= Lake Oltina =

Lake in Romania

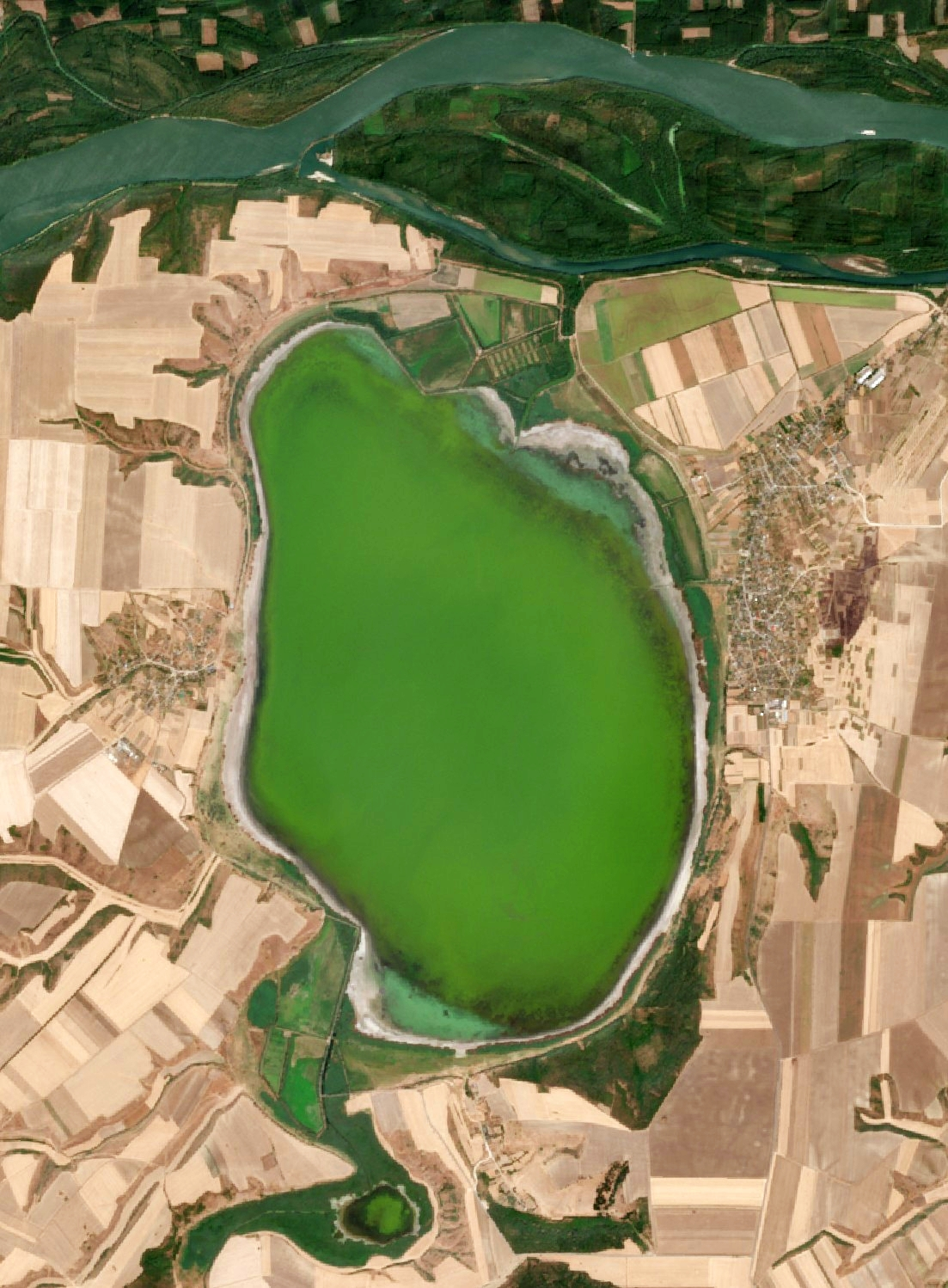
- Sentinel-2 image (2025)

- Location within Romania
- Location: Oltina, Northern Dobruja, Romania
- Coordinates: 44.158°N 27.634°E
- Primary inflows: Suha reka
- Primary outflows: Canaraua Fetei
- Basin countries: Romania, Bulgaria
- Surface area: 27.46 km^{2} (10.60 sq mi)
- Average depth: 1.25 m (4 ft 1 in)

Lake Oltina is a shallow lake in Northern Dobruja, Constanța County, Romania. It is drained towards the Danube by the river Canaraua Fetei. It is an important site for migratory birds.
