= Canaraua Fetei =

- Location within Romania

Location
- Country: Romania
- Counties: Constanța County

Physical characteristics
- Mouth: Danube
  - coordinates: 44.1897°N 27.6476°E
- Length: 16 km (9.9 mi)
- Basin size: 181 km^{2} (70 sq mi)

Basin features
- Progression: Danube→ Black Sea
- Tributaries
  - right: Chici
- River code: XIV.1.39

The Canaraua Fetei is a right tributary of the Danube in Romania. It passes through Lake Iortmac and Lake Oltina, and flows into the Danube near Oltina. Its length within Romania is 16 km (9.9 mi) and its basin size is 181 km^{2} (70 sq mi). The upper course of the river, located in neighbouring Bulgaria, is known as Suha reka.
