= Oltina =

- Commune
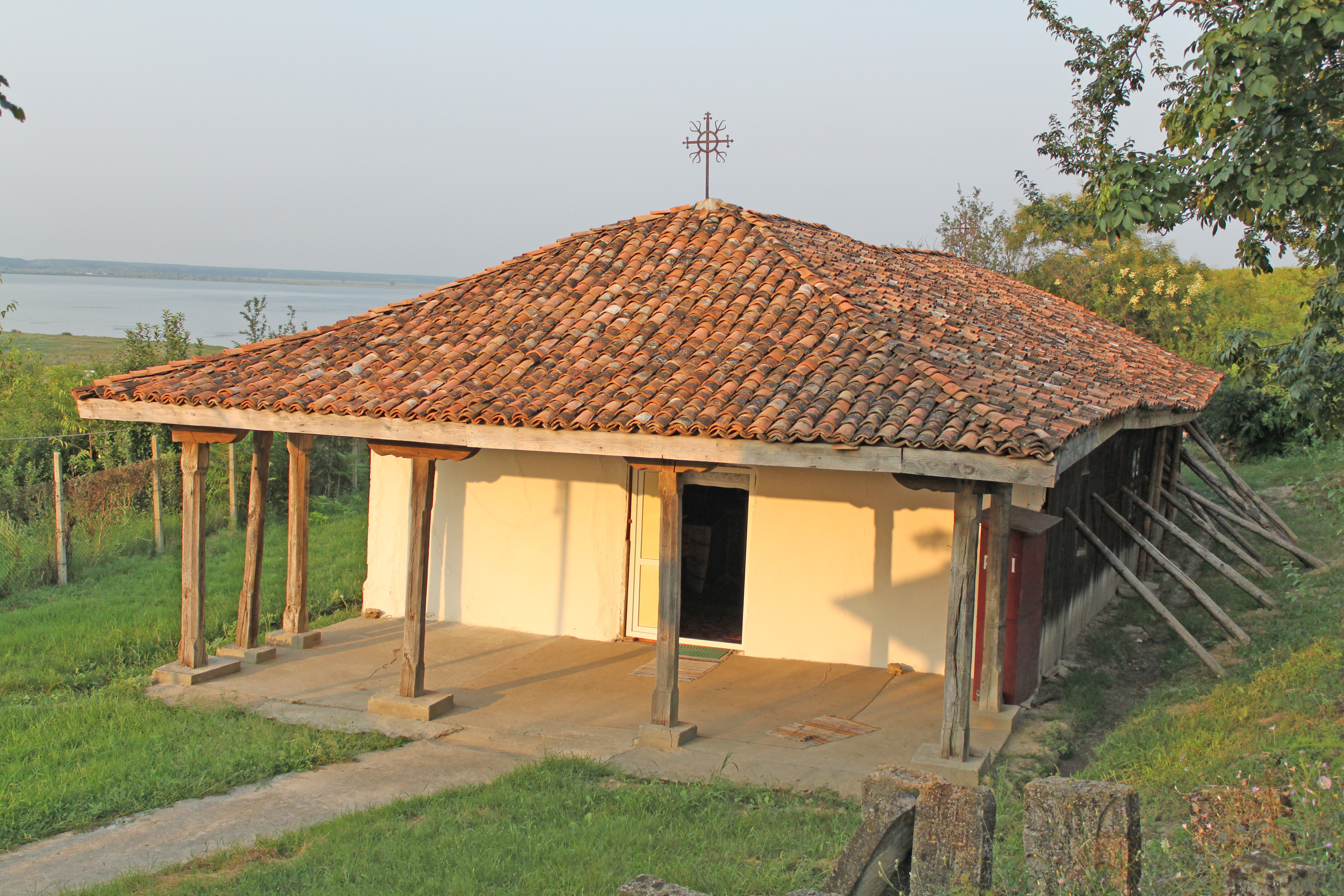
- Wooden church in Satu Nou

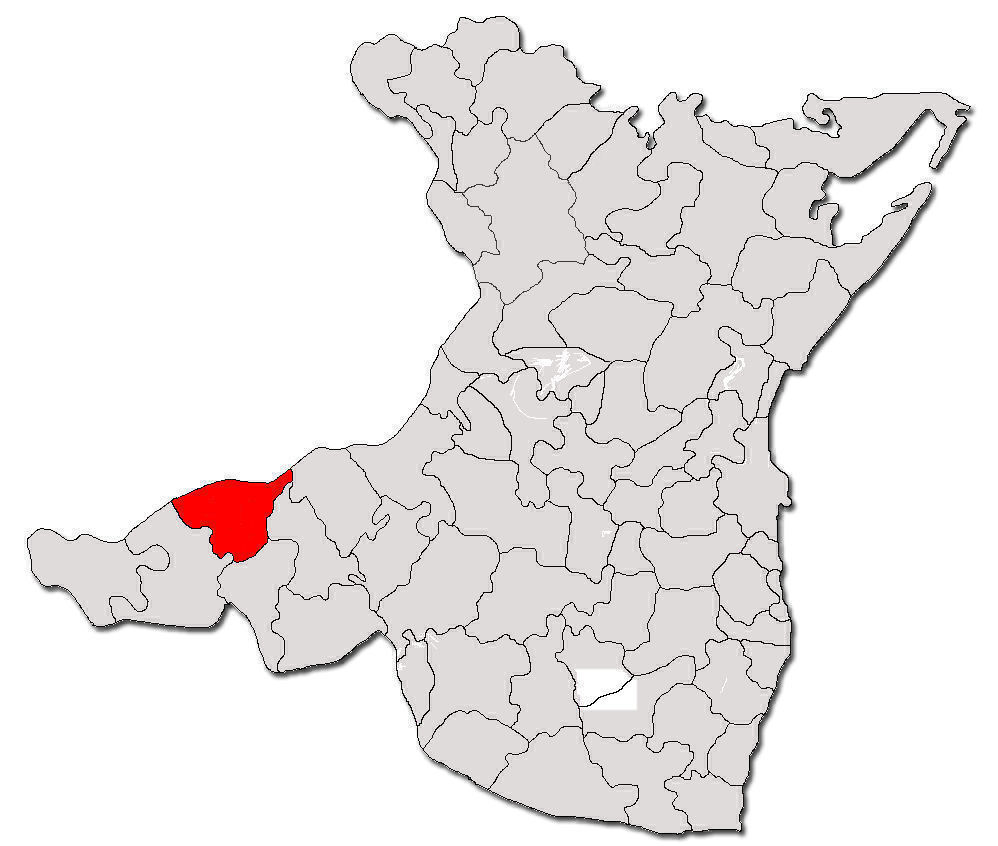
- Location in Constanța County

- Location in Romania
- Coordinates: 44°10′N 27°40′E
- Country: Romania
- County: Constanța
- Subdivisions: Oltina, Răzoarele, Satu Nou, Strunga

Government
  - Mayor (2020–2024): Ștefania Cealera (PSD)
- Area: 117.67 km^{2} (45.43 sq mi)
- Elevation: 40 m (130 ft)
- Population (2021-12-01): 2,241
  - Density: 19.04/km^{2} (49.33/sq mi)
- Time zone: UTC+02:00 (EET)
  - Summer (DST): UTC+03:00 (EEST)
- Postal code: 907215
- Area code: +40 x41
- Vehicle reg.: CT
- Website: www.primariaoltina.ro

Oltina (Romanian pronunciation: [olˈtina]) is a commune in Constanța County, Northern Dobruja, Romania. It lies on the right bank of the Danube, on the shores of Lake Oltina, which is drained towards the Danube by the river Canaraua Fetei.

The commune includes four villages:

- Oltina (historical name: Goltina, Bulgarian: Голтинa), named after the Roman settlement Altinum, whose vestiges were found in the vicinity of the village
- Răzoarele (historical name: Curuorman, Turkish: Kuru-Orman)
- Satu Nou (historical name: Ienichioi, Turkish: Yeniköy)
- Strunga (historical name: Câșla, Turkish: Kışla)

== Demographics ==
Historical population
Year	Pop.	±%
2002	3,095	—
2011	2,593	−16.2%
2021	2,241	−13.6%
Source: Census data

At the 2011 census, Oltina had 2,593 inhabitants, of which 96.3% were of Romanian ethnicity. At the 2021 census, the commune had a population of 2,241; of those, 92.73% were Romanians.
