= Atina Grossmann =

American historian

Atina Grossmann (born 4 November 1950) is a professor at The Cooper Union for the Advancement of Science and Art. Her research relates to transnational Jewish refugee stories "Soviet Central Asia, Iran, and India: Sites of Refuge and Relief for European Jews During World War II."

== Selected publications ==
- When biology became destiny: Women in Weimar and Nazi Germany. Monthly Review Press, 1984. ISBN 978-0853456421 (Edited with Renate Bridenthal and Marion Kaplan)
- Reforming sex: The German movement for birth control & abortion reform 1920-1950. Oxford University Press, Oxford, 1995. ISBN 978-0195056723
- Jews, Germans, and allies: Close encounters in occupied Germany. Princeton University Press, 2007. ISBN 978-0691089713
- After the Nazi racial state: Difference and democracy in Germany and Europe. University of Michigan Press, 2009. ISBN 978-0472116867 (With Rita Chin, Heide Fehrenbach & Geoff Eley)
