= Altenum (castra) =

Coordinates: 44°11′26″N 27°41′43″E

- Castra of Oltina; Altinum, Altina
- Location within Romania
- Location: Dealul Maxinca, Oltina, Constanța, Romania

History
- Founded: 4th century AD
- Abandoned: 6th century AD

Site notes
- Condition: Ruined

Altenum was a fort in the Roman province of Scythia Minor in the 4th and 6th centuries AD.

== See also ==
- List of castra
