= Aetia =

Aetia may refer to:

- Combretum, the bushwillows, a genus of trees and shrubs in the family Combretaceae
- Aetia, a poem by the Ancient Greek poet and scholar Callimachus
- Aetia gens, an ancient Roman clan
