= 2025 World Senior Curling Championships =

- Host city: Fredericton, New Brunswick, Canada
- Arena: Willie O’Ree Place
- Dates: April 26 – May 3
- Men's winner: Canada
- Curling club: Caledonian CC, Regina
- Skip: Randy Bryden
- Third: Troy Robinson
- Second: Russ Bryden
- Lead: Chris Semenchuk
- Alternate: Glen Hill
- Finalist: Scotland (Brewster)
- Women's winner: Scotland
- Curling club: Dewars Centre, Perth
- Skip: Jackie Lockhart
- Third: Mairi Milne
- Second: Claire Milne
- Lead: Katie Loudon
- Finalist: Canada (Atina Ford-Johnston)

The 2025 World Senior Curling Championships was held from April 26 to May 3 at the Willie O’Ree Place in Fredericton, New Brunswick, Canada. The event was held in conjunction with the 2025 World Mixed Doubles Curling Championship.

== Men ==
=== Teams ===
The teams are listed as follows:

Australia	Belgium	Canada	Czech Republic	Denmark
Skip: Hamish Lorrain-Smith; Third: James Boyd; Second: Geoff Davis; Lead: David Imlah; Alternate: Brian MacDonald	Skip: Stefan van Dijck; Third: Walter Verbueken; Second: Bart Palmans; Lead: Jan de Swert	Skip: Randy Bryden; Third: Troy Robinson; Second: Russ Bryden; Lead: Chris Semenchuk; Alternate: Glen Hill	Skip: David Šik; Third: Marek Brožek; Second: Pavel Mensík; Lead: Jiří Chobot	Skip: Søren Tidmand; Third: Jens Groth Lorentzen; Second: Lars Müller; Lead: Bo Legård
England	Estonia	Finland	France	Germany
Skip: Ken Horton; Third: Douglas McGlynn; Second: Martin Gregory; Lead: Stuart Brand	Skip: Margus Tubalkain; Third: Valvo Vooremä; Second: Tonis Turmann; Lead: Hannes Reinola	Skip: Tomi Rantamäki; Third: Jermu Pöllänen; Second: Teemu Salo; Lead: Ville Lehmuskoski	Skip: Pascal Adam; Third: Mathieu Chauveau; Second: Christophe Walter; Lead: Philippe Therias	Skip: Andy Kapp; Third: Oliver Axnick; Second: Holger Höhne; Lead: Andreas Kempf; Alternate: Markus Messenzehl
Hungary	Ireland	Israel	Italy	Japan
Skip: György Nagy; Third: Zoltan Jakab; Second: Gábor Bartalus; Lead: Krisztián Barna	Skip: Bill Gray; Third: David Whyte; Second: Neil Fyfe; Lead: Tommy Campbell	Skip: Kevin Golberg; Third: Alex Pokras; Second: Aaron Horowitz; Lead: Henrique Kempenich	Skip: Antonio Menardi; Third: Valter Bombassei; Second: Marco Constantini; Lead: Adriano Regis	Fourth: Yoshito Nakamura; Third: Hidenobu Segawa; Second: Hirotada Sugawara; Skip: Kazuhito Funaki; Alternate: Naofumi Den
Latvia	Netherlands	New Zealand	Nigeria	Norway
Skip: Ansis Regža; Third: Jānis Rēdlihs; Second: Edgars Linuzs; Lead: Aivars Lācis	Skip: Bob Bomas; Third: George Murray; Second: Willem van Wieringen; Lead: Andre de Jong; Alternate: Johannes Koornstra	Skip: Dave Watt; Third: Iain Craig; Second: Lorne De Pape; Lead: Dean Fotti; Alternate: Tom Telfer	Skip: T. J. Cole; Third: Chad Johnson; Second: Charles Neimeth; Lead: Damola Daniel; Alternate: Robert Brianne	Skip: Even Ugland; Third: Rolf Sagen; Second: Karsten Sandåker; Lead: Jon Sverre Karterud; Alternate: Paul Richardson
Philippines	Poland	Portugal	Scotland	Slovenia
Skip: Jonathan Ochoco; Third: Peter Garbes; Second: Jose Nazareno; Lead: Alastair Onglingswan; Alternate: Jason Garbes	Skip: Damian Herman; Third: Pawel Klos; Second: Krzysztof Nowak; Lead: Pawel Piotrówicz; Alternate: Janusz Tomica	Skip: Vítor Santos; Third: Allan Chaves; Second: Jose Ribau; Lead: João Pacheco; Alternate: Neil Smith	Skip: Tom Brewster; Third: Frazer Hare; Second: Robbie Stevenson; Lead: Donald Frame	Skip: John Kajin; Third: John Kolenko; Second: Tony Krosel; Lead: Val Koncan; Alternate: Stan Ulcar
South Korea	Spain	Sweden	Switzerland	United States
Skip: Jung Jae-suk; Third: Jung Hyo-heon; Second: Lee Il-kyu; Lead: Seo Jung-woo; Alternate: Son Jin-suk	Skip: David Anaya; Third: José Cruz; Second: Eduardo Gutiez; Lead: Angel Mayor; Alternate: Paco Benito	Skip: Dan-Ola Eriksson; Third: Fredrik Hallström; Second: Tommy Olin; Lead: Rickard Hallström; Alternate: Per Carlsén	Skip: Dieter Wüest; Third: Jens Piesbergen; Second: Ernst Erb; Lead: Daniel Lüthi; Alternate: Marc Syfrig	Skip: Mike Farbelow; Third: Rich Ruohonen; Second: Bill Stopera; Lead: Darren Lehto
Wales				
Skip: Andrew Tanner; Third: Richard Pougher; Second: Alistair Reid; Lead: George Fyffe				

=== Round Robin Standings ===
Final Round Robin Standings

Key
Teams to Playoffs

Group A	Skip	W	L	W–L	DSC
Canada	Randy Bryden	6	0	–	55.66
England	Ken Horton	5	1	–	104.67
Portugal	Vítor Santos	3	3	–	98.84
Wales	Andrew Tanner	2	4	2–0	107.53
Ireland	Bill Gray	2	4	1–1	69.76
Netherlands	Bob Bomas	2	4	0–2	127.72
Belgium	Stefan van Dijck	1	5	–	152.93

Group B	Skip	W	L	W–L	DSC
Finland	Tomi Rantamäki	5	0	–	36.58
United States	Mike Farbelow	4	1	–	33.79
Hungary	György Nagy	3	2	–	52.71
Japan	Kazuhito Funaki	2	3	–	56.06
Israel	Kevin Golberg	1	4	–	81.54
Estonia	Margus Tubalkain	0	5	–	96.18

Group C	Skip	W	L	W–L	DSC
Norway	Even Ugland	4	1	1–0	55.18
Sweden	Dan-Ola Eriksson	4	1	0–1	57.01
Italy	Antonio Menardi	3	2	1–0	87.12
Latvia	Ansis Regža	3	2	0–1	104.84
France	Pascal Adam	1	4	–	100.78
Nigeria	T. J. Cole	0	5	–	109.29

Group D	Skip	W	L	W–L	DSC
Germany	Andy Kapp	5	0	–	73.52
Scotland	Tom Brewster	4	1	–	49.57
South Korea	Jung Jae-suk	3	2	–	128.22
Denmark	Søren Tidmand	2	3	–	90.74
New Zealand	Dave Watt	1	4	–	86.48
Spain	David Anaya	0	5	–	115.32

Group E	Skip	W	L	W–L	DSC
Switzerland	Dieter Wüest	4	1	1–0	41.61
Czech Republic	David Šik	4	1	0–1	68.78
Poland	Damian Herman	3	2	–	78.70
Australia	Hamish Lorrain-Smith	2	3	1–0	58.49
Slovenia	John Kajin	2	3	0–1	76.96
Philippines	Jonathan Ochoco	0	5	–	150.09

Group A Round Robin Summary Table
Pos.	Country	Belgium	Canada	England		Netherlands	Portugal	Wales	Record
7	Belgium	—	3–6	6–14	4–7	3–8	5–6	8–7	1–5
1	Canada	6–3	—	8–2	9–4	14–2	15–2	11–2	6–0
2	England	14–6	2–8	—	8–3	15–3	6–4	12–5	5–1
5	Ireland	7–4	4–9	3–8	—	12–7	5–6	5–8	2–4
6	Netherlands	8–3	2–14	3–15	7–12	—	7–4	6–7	2–4
3	Portugal	6–5	2–15	4–6	6–5	4–7	—	7–3	3–3
4	Wales	7–8	2–11	5–12	8–5	7–6	3–7	—	2–4

Group B Round Robin Summary Table
Pos.	Country	Estonia	Finland	Hungary	Israel	Japan	United States	Record
6	Estonia	—	1–19	2–9	1–11	2–8	2–14	0–5
1	Finland	19–1	—	7–3	9–3	8–4	7–1	4–0
3	Hungary	9–2	3–7	—	6–5	8–3	4–8	3–2
5	Israel	11–1	3–9	5–6	—	6–8	2–5	1–4
4	Japan	8–2	4–8	3–8	8–6	—	4–12	2–3
2	United States	14–2	1–7	8–4	5–2	12–4	—	4–1

Group C Round Robin Summary Table
Pos.	Country	France	Italy	Latvia	Nigeria	Norway	Sweden	Record
5	France	—	7–9	3–7	9–2	4–16	2–9	1–4
3	Italy	9–7	—	7–6	12–1	2–9	2–9	3–2
4	Latvia	7–3	6–7	—	8–3	5–3	2–7	3–2
6	Nigeria	2–9	1–12	3–8	—	2–13	0–16	0–5
1	Norway	16–4	9–2	3–5	13–2	—	7–3	4–1
2	Sweden	9–2	9–2	7–2	16–0	3–7	—	4–1

Group D Round Robin Summary Table
Pos.	Country	Denmark	Germany	New Zealand	Scotland	South Korea	Spain	Record
4	Denmark	—	4–9	9–4	1–17	4–8	11–6	2–3
1	Germany	9–4	—	9–6	5–3	7–3	12–0	5–0
5	New Zealand	4–9	6–9	—	1–8	2–7	6–5	1–4
2	Scotland	17–1	3–5	8–1	—	5–3	11–2	4–1
3	South Korea	8–4	3–7	7–2	3–5	—	12–1	3–2
6	Spain	6–11	0–12	5–6	2–11	1–12	—	0–5

Group E Round Robin Summary Table
Pos.	Country	Australia	Czech Republic	Philippines	Poland	Slovenia	Switzerland	Record
4	Australia	—	4–8	7–3	5–8	4–3	6–10	2–3
2	Czech Republic	8–4	—	12–1	9–3	16–1	3–8	4–1
6	Philippines	3–7	1–12	—	4–7	1–9	2–10	0–5
3	Poland	8–5	3–9	7–4	—	8–10	6–5	3–2
5	Slovenia	3–4	1–16	9–1	10–8	—	4–8	2–3
1	Switzerland	10–6	8–3	10–2	5–6	8–4	—	4–1

=== Playoffs ===
Qualification
8	Sweden	7
9	Czech Republic	11
5	Germany	12
12	Poland	1
6	United States	8
11	Hungary	3
7	Scotland	10
10	England	2

Quarterfinals
1	Finland	5
9	Czech Republic	2
4	Canada	6
5	Germany	5
3	Norway	3
6	United States	6
2	Switzerland	3
7	Scotland	8

Semifinals
1	Finland	3
4	Canada	6
6	United States	1
7	Scotland	10

Gold medal game
4	Canada	10
7	Scotland	7
Bronze medal game
1	Finland	5
6	United States	6

==== Qualification ====
Thursday, May 1, 20:00

Sheet G	1	2	3	4	5	6	7	8	Final
Sweden (Eriksson)	3	0	0	2	0	2	0	0	7
Czech Republic (Šik) 🔨	0	1	1	0	2	0	4	3	11

Sheet H	1	2	3	4	5	6	7	8	Final
Germany (Kapp)	3	3	3	0	2	1	X	X	12
Poland (Herman) 🔨	0	0	0	1	0	0	X	X	1

Sheet J	1	2	3	4	5	6	7	8	Final
United States (Farbelow) 🔨	2	1	2	0	3	0	X	X	8
Hungary (Nagy)	0	0	0	2	0	1	X	X	3

Sheet K	1	2	3	4	5	6	7	8	Final
Scotland (Brewster) 🔨	0	2	4	0	2	2	X	X	10
England (Horton)	1	0	0	1	0	0	X	X	2

==== Quarterfinals ====
Friday, May 2, 13:00

Sheet G	1	2	3	4	5	6	7	8	Final
Canada (Bryden) 🔨	0	0	2	0	1	3	0	0	6
Germany (Kapp)	0	0	0	3	0	0	2	0	5

Sheet H	1	2	3	4	5	6	7	8	Final
Finland (Rantamäki) 🔨	1	1	0	1	0	2	0	X	5
Czech Republic (Šik)	0	0	1	0	0	0	1	X	2

Sheet J	1	2	3	4	5	6	7	8	Final
Switzerland (Wüest) 🔨	0	0	2	0	1	0	0	X	3
Scotland (Brewster)	0	1	0	3	0	2	2	X	8

Sheet K	1	2	3	4	5	6	7	8	Final
Norway (Ugland) 🔨	1	0	0	0	0	1	0	1	3
United States (Farbelow)	0	2	1	0	1	0	2	0	6

==== Semifinals ====
Friday, May 2, 19:30

Sheet K	1	2	3	4	5	6	7	8	Final
Finland (Rantamäki)	0	0	0	2	0	1	0	0	3
Canada (Bryden) 🔨	1	0	1	0	2	0	1	1	6

Sheet G	1	2	3	4	5	6	7	8	Final
United States (Farbelow)	0	0	0	0	1	0	0	X	1
Scotland (Brewster) 🔨	0	0	2	1	0	3	4	X	10

==== Bronze medal game ====
Saturday, May 3, 10:00

Sheet J	1	2	3	4	5	6	7	8	Final
United States (Farbelow) 🔨	0	2	0	1	1	0	1	1	6
Finland (Rantamäki)	2	0	2	0	0	1	0	0	5

==== Final ====
Saturday, May 3, 10:00

Sheet H	1	2	3	4	5	6	7	8	Final
Scotland (Brewster)	3	0	2	0	0	2	0	0	7
Canada (Bryden) 🔨	0	3	0	3	0	0	3	1	10

=== Final standings ===
Place	Team
1st place, gold medalist(s)	Canada
2nd place, silver medalist(s)	Scotland
3rd place, bronze medalist(s)	United States
4	Finland
5	Czech Republic
5	Germany
5	Norway
5	Switzerland
9	England
9	Hungary
9	Poland
9	Sweden
13	Italy
14	Portugal
15	South Korea
16	Japan
17	Australia
18	Denmark
19	Latvia
20	Wales
21	Ireland
22	Slovenia
23	Israel
24	New Zealand
25	France
26	Estonia
27	Nigeria
28	Spain
29	Netherlands
30	Philippines
31	Belgium

== Women ==
=== Teams ===
The teams are listed as follows:

Australia	Canada	Czech Republic	Denmark
Skip: Helen Williams; Third: Kim Irvine; Second: Adrienne Kennedy; Lead: Carolyn Swan	Skip: Atina Ford-Johnston; Third: Shannon Morris; Second: Sheri Pickering; Lead: Cori Morris; Alternate: Lesley McEwan	Fourth: Hana Čechová; Skip: Jana Voborníková; Second: Romana Havelková; Lead: Jana Zikmundová; Alternate: Vlasta Siveková	Skip: Camilla Søndergård-Nielsen; Third: Bodil Hollinger Larsen; Second: Lene Solberg; Lead: Hanne Suhr
England	Finland	Hong Kong	Ireland
Skip: Viv Kerr; Third: Carole Topping; Second: Desna Fielding; Lead: Jean Moat	Skip: Tiina Julkunen; Third: Riikka Louhivuori; Second: Janina Lindström; Lead: Nina Pollanen	Skip: Ling-Yue Hung; Third: Grace Bugg; Second: May Yam; Lead: Arena McCullough	Skip: Dale Sinclair; Third: Bernie Gillett; Second: Nina Clancy; Lead: Louise Kerr
Japan	Latvia	Lithuania	New Zealand
Skip: Miyako Yoshimura; Third: Misako Den; Second: Tamami Horiuchi; Lead: Hiromi Takizawa; Alternate: Makiko Uehara	Skip: Elena Kapostina; Third: Dace Zīle; Second: Gunta Millere; Lead: Aija Rudzīte	Skip: Asta Vaicekonyte; Third: Rasa Jasaitiene; Second: Gaiva Valatkiene; Lead: Jolanta Sulinskiene	Skip: Joanna Olszewski; Third: Sandra Thomas; Second: Elizabeth Matthews; Lead: Merran Anderson; Alternate: Juliet Charko
Scotland	Sweden	Switzerland	United States
Skip: Jackie Lockhart; Third: Mairi Milne; Second: Claire Milne; Lead: Katie Loudon	Skip: Camilla Noréen; Third: Helene Lyxell; Second: Susanne Patz; Lead: Catrin Bitén	Skip: Marianne Zürcher; Third: Marlis Kurt; Second: Ruth Dorner; Lead: Gabriela Perret; Alternate: Karin Lüthi	Skip: Margie Smith; Third: Norma O'Leary; Second: Shelly Kinney; Lead: Shelly Kosal

=== Round Robin Standings ===
Final Round Robin Standings

Key
Teams to Playoffs

Group A	Skip	W	L	W–L	DSC
Canada	Atina Ford-Johnston	5	0	–	70.90
Japan	Miyako Yoshimura	3	2	1–0	99.87
Sweden	Camilla Noréen	3	2	0–1	125.91
Czech Republic	Jana Voborníková	1	4	–	148.58
Hong Kong	Ling-Yue Hung	0	5	–	114.98

Group B	Skip	W	L	W–L	DSC
Scotland	Jackie Lockhart	5	0	–	36.13
Finland	Tiina Julkunen	4	1	–	122.46
United States	Margie Smith	3	2	–	99.52
Latvia	Elena Kapostina	1	4	–	119.58
New Zealand	Joanna Olszewski	0	5	–	114.00

Group C	Skip	W	L	W–L	DSC
Ireland	Dale Sinclair	5	0	–	94.36
Switzerland	Marianne Zürcher	4	1	–	94.80
Denmark	Camilla Søndergård-Nielsen	2	3	1–1	108.80
Lithuania	Asta Vaicekonyte	2	3	1–1	133.40
Australia	Helen Williams	2	3	1–1	146.13
England	Viv Kerr	0	5	–	123.04

Group A Round Robin Summary Table
Pos.	Country	Canada	Czech Republic	Hong Kong	Japan	Sweden	Group B		Record
1	Canada	—	17–1	8–5	6–4	6–3	New Zealand	13–1	5–0
4	Czech Republic	1–17	—	10–7	4–12	1–10	United States	4–9	1–4
5	Hong Kong	5–8	7–10	—	1–9	3–6	Scotland	2–11	0–5
2	Japan	4–6	12–4	9–1	—	6–4	Finland	7–8	3–2
3	Sweden	3–6	10–1	6–3	4–6	—	Latvia	6–4	3–2

Group B Round Robin Summary Table
Pos.	Country	Finland	Latvia	New Zealand	Scotland	United States	Group A		Record
2	Finland	—	10–7	9–1	1–8	8–4	Japan	8–7	4–1
4	Latvia	7–10	—	12–1	1–10	2–10	Sweden	4–6	1–4
5	New Zealand	1–9	1–12	—	2–16	3–9	Canada	1–13	0–5
1	Scotland	8–1	10–1	16–2	—	11–7	Hong Kong	11–2	5–0
3	United States	4–8	10–2	9–3	7–11	—	Czech Republic	9–4	3–2

Group C Round Robin Summary Table
Pos.	Country	Australia	Denmark	England		Lithuania	Switzerland	Record
5	Australia	—	2–10	11–2	3–6	7–4	3–9	2–3
3	Denmark	10–2	—	9–5	2–11	4–8	5–6	2–3
6	England	2–11	5–9	—	1–10	4–7	2–9	0–5
1	Ireland	6–3	11–2	10–1	—	9–2	6–5	5–0
4	Lithuania	4–7	8–4	7–4	2–9	—	3–13	2–3
2	Switzerland	9–3	6–5	9–2	5–6	13–3	—	4–1

=== Playoffs ===
Quarterfinals
1	Scotland	12
8	Denmark	2
4	Switzerland	3
5	Japan	6
3	Ireland	8
6	Finland	3
2	Canada	9
7	United States	5

Semifinals
1	Scotland	6
5	Japan	3
3	Ireland	4
2	Canada	9

Gold medal game
1	Scotland	10
2	Canada	2
Bronze medal game
5	Japan	4
3	Ireland	6

==== Quarterfinals ====
Friday, May 2, 9:00

Sheet G	1	2	3	4	5	6	7	8	Final
Scotland (Lockhart) 🔨	2	4	0	3	0	3	X	X	12
Denmark (Søndergård-Nielsen)	0	0	1	0	1	0	X	X	2

Sheet H	1	2	3	4	5	6	7	8	Final
Switzerland (Zürcher) 🔨	1	0	0	1	0	0	0	1	3
Japan (Yoshimura)	0	0	2	0	0	2	2	0	6

Sheet J	1	2	3	4	5	6	7	8	Final
Ireland (Sinclair) 🔨	1	2	2	0	0	1	2	X	8
Finland (Julkunen)	0	0	0	2	1	0	0	X	3

Sheet K	1	2	3	4	5	6	7	8	Final
Canada (Ford-Johnston) 🔨	0	1	0	4	0	0	4	X	9
United States (Smith)	0	0	2	0	1	2	0	X	5

==== Semifinals ====
Friday, May 2, 19:30

Sheet H	1	2	3	4	5	6	7	8	Final
Ireland (Sinclair)	0	0	1	1	0	2	0	X	4
Canada (Ford-Johnston) 🔨	3	4	0	0	1	0	1	X	9

Sheet J	1	2	3	4	5	6	7	8	Final
Scotland (Lockhart) 🔨	1	0	2	1	0	0	2	X	6
Japan (Yoshimura)	0	1	0	0	1	1	0	X	3

==== Bronze medal game ====
Saturday, May 3, 10:00

Sheet K	1	2	3	4	5	6	7	8	Final
Ireland (Sinclair) 🔨	1	0	0	1	0	2	2	0	6
Japan (Yoshimura)	0	1	1	0	1	0	0	1	4

==== Final ====
Saturday, May 3, 10:00

Sheet G	1	2	3	4	5	6	7	8	Final
Scotland (Lockhart) 🔨	1	0	2	3	4	0	X	X	10
Canada (Ford-Johnston)	0	1	0	0	0	1	X	X	2

=== Final standings ===
Place	Team
1st place, gold medalist(s)	Scotland
2nd place, silver medalist(s)	Canada
3rd place, bronze medalist(s)	Ireland
4	Japan
5	Denmark
5	Finland
5	Switzerland
5	United States
9	Sweden
10	Latvia
11	Lithuania
12	Czech Republic
13	New Zealand
14	Hong Kong
15	Australia
16	England
