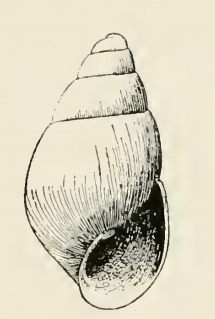
- Apertural view of a shell of Odostomia altina

Scientific classification
- Kingdom: Animalia
- Phylum: Mollusca
- Class: Gastropoda
- Family: Pyramidellidae
- Genus: Odostomia
- Species: O. altina

Binomial name
- Odostomia altina Dall & Bartsch, 1909

Synonyms
- Evalea altina Dall & Bartsch, 1909; Odostomia (Evalea) altina Dall & Bartsch, 1909 (basionym)

= Odostomia altina =

Species of gastropod

Odostomia altina is a species of sea snail, a marine gastropod mollusc in the family Pyramidellidae, the pyrams and their allies.

== Description ==
The ovate shell is white. Its length measures 3 mm. The whorls of the protoconch are deeply obliquely immersed in the first of the succeeding turns, above which only the tilted edge of the last volution projects. The five whorls of the teleoconch are well rounded, feebly contracted at the suture and appressed at the summit. The suture is slightly impressed. The periphery is obscurely angulated. The base of the shell is well rounded. The entire surface is marked by slightly retractive lines of growth and exceedingly fine spiral striations. The aperture is ovate. The posterior angle is acute. The outer lip is thin. The columella is strongly curved, decidedly revolute and provided with a strong fold at its insertion.

== Distribution ==
This species occurs in the Pacific Ocean off California
