= Atina Ford =

Canadian curler (born 1971)

Atina Ford Johnston
- Curler
- Born: October 12, 1971 (age 55); Gray, Saskatchewan, Canada

Team
- Curling club: Okotoks Curling Club, Okotoks

Curling career
- Member Association: Saskatchewan (1988–2001); Alberta (2001–Present)
- Hearts: 2 (1997, 1998)
- Other appearances: World Senior Championship: 1 (2025)
Medal record
Women's curling
Representing Canada
Olympic Games
Gold medal – first place	1998 Nagano	Team
World championships
Gold medal – first place	1997 Berne	Team
World Senior Championships
Silver medal – second place	2025 Fredericton	Team
World Junior Curling Championships
Bronze medal – third place	1991 Glasgow	Team
Representing Saskatchewan
Scotties Tournament of Hearts
Gold medal – first place	1997 Vancouver
Bronze medal – third place	1998 Regina
Canadian Olympic Curling Trials
Gold medal – first place	1997 Brandon

Atina Ford Johnston is not to be confused with Anita Ford, her mother and former coach

Atina Ford Johnston (born October 12, 1971; née Ford) is a Canadian curler originally from Gray, Saskatchewan. She is best known as the alternate of the Sandra Schmirler team, with whom she is an Olympic Champion (1998), World women's champion (1997) and Canadian women's champion (1997).

== Early life ==
Ford is the daughter of curlers Gary and Anita Ford, and grew up in the hamlet of Gray, Saskatchewan. In addition to curling, she figure skated, and played ice hockey and fastball as a youth. She attended Sheldon-Williams Collegiate in Regina for high school, and led a team to the provincial high school final in 1989.

== Curling career ==
=== Juniors ===
Ford had a successful junior career, reaching its pinnacle in 1990. She led her rink of Darlene Kidd, Leslie Beck and sister Cindy to a provincial championship, defeating Marla Miller in the Saskatchewan junior final. The team then went on to represent Saskatchewan at the 1990 Canadian Junior Curling Championships, played in the Sudbury, Ontario suburb of Garson. Ford led her team to an 8–2 round robin record, and then won both their playoff games, including Manitoba's Nancy Malanchuk rink in the final. The team then went on to represent Canada at the 1991 World Junior Curling Championships in Glasgow, Scotland. There, she led her team to an undefeated record in the round robin, only to lose in the semifinal to Sweden's Eva Eriksson rink. With the loss, the team took home a bronze medal.

=== Schmirler's fifth ===
After Sandra Schmirler won the 1997 Saskatchewan Scott Tournament of Hearts, Ford joined the team as their fifth player. The team represented the province at the national 1997 Scott Tournament of Hearts. As the fifth player, Ford subbed in for the team's final round robin game after third Jan Betker suffered a pulled left quadriceps. The team went on to win the Tournament, earning the right to represent Canada at the 1997 World Women's Curling Championship. At the Worlds, Ford replaced an ailing Betker, who had a pulled abductor muscle in their games against the United States Japan, and Scotland. The team went on to win the gold medal.

Ford was retained as the Schmirler team's alternate at the 1997 Canadian Olympic Curling Trials, which Schmirler won, earning the rink the right to represent Canada at the 1998 Winter Olympics. At the Olympics, Ford saw action in their match against Germany, replacing an ailing Betker. The team won the gold medal, defeating Denmark in the Olympic final. The team returned home to Regina from the Olympics on February 18, and immediately had to prepare for the 1998 Scott Tournament of Hearts which began three days later, also in Regina. There, the rink would represent Team Canada as defending champions, and finished in third.

A year after the Olympics, Ford defeated Schmirler in the Regina playdowns to qualify for the 1999 Saskatchewan Scott Tournament of Hearts, her first provincial championship appearance as a skip. At provincials, Ford led her team to a 5–2 record, and lost in the semifinals to Cindy Street.

In 1999, Ford was inducted into Canadian Curling Hall of Fame together with all of the Sandra Schmirler team.

=== Move to Alberta ===
Ford moved to Sherwood Park, Alberta in 2001. She immediately joined the Heather Nedohin rink as her third, and won the 2002 Autumn Gold Curling Classic in their second season together. Ford took over skipping duties of the team, while Nedohin threw last rocks at the 2003 Alberta Scott Tournament of Hearts, emulating Nedohin's husband David's team, which was skipped by Randy Ferbey. This was done because Ford displaced eight ribs after falling on her shoulder at the 2003 Canada Cup of Curling, held earlier that month, meaning her ability to sweep would be hindered. At the Alberta Hearts, the team lost in the semifinal to Shannon Kleibrink. The team retained the same lineup with Ford skipping and throwing third for the next season. Ford led the team to another semifinal loss at the 2004 Alberta Hearts, losing to Deb Santos. The team broke up in 2005, jokingly due to an 'epidemic of babies on [the] team'. Ford returned to the Alberta Hearts in 2007 with two members of the previous Nedohin team (Lawnie MacDonald and Rona Pasika), plus Renee Keane, all of whom were new mothers. The team finished the event with a 2–5 record, in 7th place.

=== Seniors ===
Ford made her return to nationals-level curling by skipping the Alberta rink at the 2023 Canadian Senior Curling Championships, where her team finished fourth. Ford-Johnston returned again to the Canadian Seniors in 2024, winning 5-4 against Ontario's Jo-Ann Rizzo in the gold medal game, and will represent Canada at the 2025 World Senior Curling Championships. At the World Championships, Ford-Johnston would win the sliver medal, losing to Scotland's Jackie Lockhart in the final.

== Personal life ==
Ford currently lives in Okotoks, Alberta She is married to fellow curler Wade Johnston.
