= List of World Junior Curling Champions =

The following is a list of the winners of the World Junior Curling Championships since the inception of the championships in 1975.

For men's and women's team, name of fourth, then third, second, lead and alternate (if have) is listed in the team member list. Name of skip is in Bold.

For mixed doubles team, name of female curler, then male curler is listed in the team member list.

== Medallists (Men's) ==
Men's junior world curling champions
Year	Gold		Silver		Bronze	
Year	Country	Team	Country	Team	Country	Team
1975	Sweden	**Jan Ullsten**; Mats Nyberg; Anders Grahn; Bo Söderström	Canada	**Robb King**; Brad Hannah; Bill Fowlis; Chris King	Scotland	**Peter J. D. Wilson**; Andrew McQuistin; Neale McQuistin; John Sharp
1976	Canada	**Paul Gowsell**; Neil Houston; Glen Jackson; Kelly Stearne	Sweden	**Jan Ullsten**; Mats Nyberg; Anders Grahn; Bo Söderström	Norway	**Sjur Loen**; Morten Søgård; Hans Bekkelund; Roar Rise
1977	Canada	**Bill Jenkins**; John Scales; Sandy Stewart; Alan Mayhew	Sweden	**Anders Grahn**; Mats Nyberg; Bo Söderström; Bo-Göran Strömberg	United States	**Donald Barcome Jr.** Dale Mueller; Gary Mueller; Earl Barcome
1978	Canada	**Paul Gowsell**; John Ferguson; Douglas McFarlane; Kelly Stearne	Sweden	**Thomas Håkansson**; Per Lindeman; Lars Lindgren; Erik Björemo	Scotland	**Colin Hamilton**; Douglas Edwardson; Trevor Dodds; David Ramsay
1979	United States	**Donald Barcome Jr.** Randy Darling; Bobby Stalker; Earl Barcome	Scotland	**Andrew McQuistin**; Neale McQuistin; Hugh Aitken; Dick Adams	Canada	**Darren Fish**; Lorne Barker; Murray Ursulak; Randy Ursuliak
1980	Scotland	**Andrew McQuistin**; Norman Brown; Hugh Aitken; Dick Adams	Canada	**Mert Thompsett**; Lyle Derry; Joel Gagne; Mike Friesen	Sweden	**Thomas Norgren**; Peter Svedlund; Conny Ekholm; Erik Pettersson
1981	Scotland	**Peter Wilson**; Jim Cannon; Roger McIntyre; John Parker	Canada	**Denis Marchand**; Denis Cecil; Larry Phillips; Yves Barrette	United States	**Ted Purvis**; Dale Risling; Milton Jr Best; Dean Risling
1982	Sweden	**Sören Grahn**; Niclas Järund; Henrik Holmberg; Anders Svennerstedt	Canada	**Mert Thompsett**; Bill Jr McTavish; Joel Gagne; Mike Friesen	Scotland	**Robin Gray**; Mark Stokes; Drew Howie; David Mack
1983	Canada	**John Base**; Bruce Webster; Dave McAnerney; Jim Donahoe	Norway	**Pål Trulsen**; Flemming Davanger; Stig-Arne Gunnestad; Kjell Berg	Scotland	**Mike Hay**; David Hay; David Smith; Russell Keiller
1984	United States	**Al Edwards**; Mark Larson; Dewey Basley; Kurt Disher	Switzerland	**André Flotron**; Andreas Hänni; Daniel Gutknecht; André Szodoray	Scotland	**Mike Hay**; David Smith; Gregor Smith; Russell Keiller
1985	Canada	**Bob Ursel**; Brent Mendella; Gerald Chick; Mike Ursel	Switzerland	**Christian Saager**; Jens Piesbergen; Urs Spiegel; Jörg Piesbergen	Scotland	**Hammy McMillan**; David Smith; Peter Smith; Peter Thomson
1986	Scotland	**David Aitken**; Robin Halliday; Peter Smith; Harry Reilly	Canada	**Kevin Martin**; Rick Feeney; Dan Petryk; Mike Berger	Sweden	Örjan Erixon; **Peter Larsson**; Krister Olsson; Mats Rosenhed
1987	Scotland	**Douglas Dryburgh**; Philip Wilson; Lindsay Clark; Billy Andrew	Canada	**Hugh McFadyen**; Jonathan Mead; Norman Gould; John Lange	Norway	**Anthon Grimsmo**; Tore Torvbråten; Jan Thoresen; Dag Skjelstad
1988	Canada	**Jim Sullivan**; Charles Sullivan; Craig Burgess; Danny Alderman	Sweden	**Peja Lindholm**; Magnus Swartling; Johan Hansson; Niklas Kallerbäck	Norway	**Thomas Ulsrud**; Thomas Due; Krister Aanesen; Mads Rygg
1989	Sweden	**Peja Lindholm**; Magnus Swartling; Owe Ljungdahl; Peter Narup; Johan Hansson	Canada	**Mike Wood**; Mike Bradley; Todd Troyer; Greg Hawkes	Switzerland	**Markus Eggler**; Marc Haudenschild; Frank Kobel; Reto Huber; Stefan Traub
1990	Switzerland	**Stefan Traub**; Andreas Östreich; Markus Widmer; Roland Müggler	Scotland	**Graeme Connal**; Iain Watt; Richard Hartley; Ian Baxter	Sweden	**Peja Lindholm**; Magnus Swartling; Magnus Burman; Peter Narup; Tomas Nordin
1991	Scotland	**Alan MacDougall**; James Dryburgh; Fraser MacGregor; Colin Beckett	Canada	**Noel Herron**; Rob Brewer; Steve Small; Richard Polk; Peter Henderson	Switzerland	**Dominic Andres**; Mike Schüpbach; Marc Steiner; Mathias Hügli; Stefan Heilman
1991	Scotland	**Alan MacDougall**; James Dryburgh; Fraser MacGregor; Colin Beckett	Canada	**Noel Herron**; Rob Brewer; Steve Small; Richard Polk; Peter Henderson	United States	**Eric Fenson**; Shawn Rojeski; Kevin Bergstrom; Ted McCann; Mike Peplinski
1992	Switzerland	**Stefan Heilman**; Christoph Grossenbacher; Lucian Jenzer; Roger Wyss	France	**Jan Henri Ducroz**; Spencer Mugnier; Sylvain Ducroz; Thomas Dufour; Philippe Caux	Canada	**Jason Repay**; Aaron Skillen; Scott McCallum; Trevor Clifford
1992	Switzerland	**Stefan Heilman**; Christoph Grossenbacher; Lucian Jenzer; Roger Wyss	France	**Jan Henri Ducroz**; Spencer Mugnier; Sylvain Ducroz; Thomas Dufour; Philippe Caux	Sweden	**Joakim Carlsson**; Mathias Carlsson; Ola Kindlund; Lars Eriksson; Peter Danielsson
1993	Scotland	**Craig Wilson**; Neil Murdoch; Ricky Burnett; Craig Strawhorn; Stuart Byers	Canada	**Michel Ferland**; Marco Berthelot; Steve Beaudry; Steve Guetre; Philippe Lemay	France	**Spencer Mugnier**; Thomas Dufour; Sylvain Ducroz; Philippe Caux; Cyrille Prunet
1993	Scotland	**Craig Wilson**; Neil Murdoch; Ricky Burnett; Craig Strawhorn; Stuart Byers	Canada	**Michel Ferland**; Marco Berthelot; Steve Beaudry; Steve Guetre; Philippe Lemay	Germany	**Markus Herberg**; Daniel Herberg; Stephan Knoll; Markus Messenzehl; Oliver Trevisiol
1994	Canada	**Colin Davison**; Kelly Mittelstadt; Scott Pfeifer; Sean Morris; Rob Simpson	Germany	**Daniel Herberg**; Stephan Knoll; Oliver Trevisiol; Markus Rohrmoser; Hans-Peter Kiess	Switzerland	**Yannick Renggli**; Chrislian Razafimahefa; Gregory Renggli; Patrick Tinembart; Ralph Stöckli
1994	Canada	**Colin Davison**; Kelly Mittelstadt; Scott Pfeifer; Sean Morris; Rob Simpson	Germany	**Daniel Herberg**; Stephan Knoll; Oliver Trevisiol; Markus Rohrmoser; Hans-Peter Kiess	United States	**Mike Peplinski**; Craig Brown; Ryan Braudt; Cory Ward; Ryan Quinn
1995	Scotland	**Tom Brewster**; Paul Westwood; Ronald Brewster; Steve Still; David Murdoch	Germany	**Daniel Herberg**; Sebastian Stock; Stephan Wiedemann; Patrick Hoffman; Sebastian Linkemann	Canada	**Christopher Galbraith**; Scott Cripps; Brent Barrett; Bryan Galbraith
1996	Scotland	**James Dryburgh**; Ross Barnet; Ronald Brewster; David Murdoch; Euan Byers	Switzerland	**Ralph Stöckli**; Michael Bösiger; Pascal Sieber; Clemens Oberwiler; Martin Zaugg	Germany	**Sebastian Stock**; Patrick Hoffman; Stephan Wiedemann; Sebastian Linkemann; Sebastian Jacoby
1997	Switzerland	**Ralph Stöckli**; Michael Bösiger; Pascal Sieber; Clemens Oberwiler; Martin Zaugg	Finland	**Perttu Piilo**; Kalle Kiiskinen; Paavo Kuosmanen; Petri Manninen; Olli Orrainen	Canada	Scott Pfeifer; **Ryan Keane**; Blayne Iskiw; Peter Heck; Jason Lesmeister
1998	Canada	**John Morris**; Craig Savill; Andy Ormsby; Brent Laing; Brad Gushue	Scotland	**Garry MacKay**; David Murdoch; Sandy Reid; Richard Woods; Neil Wilson	Switzerland	**Ralph Stöckli**; Martin Zaugg; Simon Strübin; Clemens Oberwiler; Christian Haller
1999	Canada	**John Morris**; Craig Savill; Jason Young; Brent Laing; Andy Ormsby	Switzerland	**Christian Haller**; Urs Eichhorn; Pascal Albertin; René Kunz; Patrick Vuille	United States	**Andy Roza**; Steve Jaixen; Kevin Jordan; Crhis Becher; Scott Jordan
2000	Canada	**Brad Kuhn**; Kevin Folk; Ryan Kuhn; Hugh Bennett; Jeff Richard	Switzerland	**Patrick Vuille**; Gilles Vuille; Erich Leeman; Benjamin Jaggi; Mark Hauser	Germany	**Christian Baumann**; Alexander Baumann; Ingmar Fritz; Thomas Unterstab; Moritz Unterstab
2001	Canada	**Brad Gushue**; Mark Nichols; Brent Hamilton; Mike Adam; Jamie Korab	Denmark	**Casper Bossen**; Kenneth Daucke Andersen; Kim Sylvest Nielsen; Sune Frederiksen; Nicolai Frederiksen	United States	**Andy Roza**; Steve Jaixen; Chris Becher; Scott Jordan; Tyler George
2002	Canada	**David Hamblin**; Ross Derksen; Kevin Hamblin; Ross McCannell; Douglas Hamblin	Sweden	Carl-Axel Dahlin; **Eric Carlsén**; Nils Carlsén; Emanuel Allberg; Daniel Tenn	Scotland	**Kenny Edwards**; Duncan Clark; Graeme Baxter; Philip Garden; Colin Campbell
2003	Canada	**Steve Laycock**; Christopher Haichert; Michael Jantzen; Kyler Broad; Ben Hebert	Sweden	Carl-Axel Dahlin; **Eric Carlsén**; Nils Carlsén; Emanuel Allberg; Daniel Tenn	Switzerland	**Jan Hauser**; Pascal Hess; Fabian Kuster; Remo Schmid; Stefan Rindlisbacher
2004	Sweden	**Niklas Edin**; Nils Carlsén; Jörgen Granberg; Fredrik Lindberg; Anders Eriksson	Switzerland	**Stefan Rindlisbacher**; Sven Iten; Michael Hammerer; Reto Jetzer; Toni Müller	Scotland	**Scott Hamilton**; Graham Smith; Gareth Owen; David Morton; Craig Reid
2005	Canada	**Kyle George**; Justin Mihalicz; David Kidby; Chris Hebert; Dustin Kidby	Sweden	**Nils Carlsén**; Sebastian Kraupp; Marcus Hasselborg; Emanuel Allberg; Niklas Edin	Scotland	**Logan Gray**; Ross Paterson; Sandy Gilmour; Graeme Copland; Keith Duncan Millar
2006	Canada	**Charley Thomas**; Geoff Walker; Rollie Robinson; Kyle Reynolds; Matthew Ng	Sweden	**Nils Carlsén**; Niklas Edin; Marcus Hasselborg; Emanuel Allberg; Fredrik Lindberg	Scotland	**Logan Gray**; Alasdair Guthrie; Keith Duncan Millar; Gordon McDougall; Scott Hamilton
2007	Canada	**Charley Thomas**; Brock Virtue; Matthew Ng; Kyle Reynolds; Geoff Walker	Sweden	**Niklas Edin**; Marcus Hasselborg; Emanuel Allberg; Fredrik Lindberg; Kristian Lindström	Switzerland	**Christian von Gunten**; Sven Michel; Sandro Trolliet; Michel Gribi; Claudio Pätz
2008	United States	**Chris Plys**; Aanders Brorson; Matthew Perushek; Matthew Hamilton; Daniel Plys	Sweden	**Oskar Eriksson**; Henric Jonsson; Marcus Franzén; Nils Karlsson; Markus Eriksson	Canada	**William Dion**; Jean-Michel Arsenault; Erik Lachance; Miguel Bernard; Alexandre Gauthier-Morissette
2009	Denmark	**Rasmus Stjerne**; Mikkel Krause; Oliver Dupont; Troels Harry; Martin Poulsen	Canada	**Brett Gallant**; Jamie Danbrook; Adam Casey; Anson Carmody; Stephen Burgess	United States	**Chris Plys**; Aanders Brorson; Matthew Perushek; Matthew Hamilton; Aaron Wald
2010	Switzerland	Benoît Schwarz; Roger Gulka; **Peter de Cruz**; Valentin Tanner; Dominik Märki	Scotland	**Ally Fraser**; Steven Mitchell; Scott Andrews; Kerr Drummond; Blair Fraser	Canada	**Jake Walker**; Craig Van Ymeren; Geoff Chambers; Matthew Mapletoft; Mathew Camm
2011	Sweden	Kristian Lindström; **Oskar Eriksson**; Henrik Leek; Alexander Lindström; Christoffer Sundgren	Switzerland	Benoît Schwarz; **Peter de Cruz**; Roger Gulka; Valentin Tanner; Dominik Märki	Norway	**Steffen Mellemseter**; Markus Snøve Høiberg; Magnus Nedregotten; Sander Rølvåg; Eirik Mjøen
2012	Canada	**Brendan Bottcher**; Evan Asmussen; Landon Bucholz; Bryce Bucholz; Parker Konschuh	Sweden	**Rasmus Wranå**; Jordan Wåhlin; Daniel Lövstrand; Axel Sjöberg; Patric Mabergs	Scotland	**Kyle Smith**; Thomas Muirhead; Kyle Waddell; Kerr Drummond; Hammy McMillan Jr.
2013	Scotland	**Kyle Smith**; Thomas Muirhead; Kyle Waddell; Cammy Smith; Hammy McMillan Jr.	Russia	**Evgeny Arkhipov**; Sergey Glukhov; Timur Gadzhikhanov; Artur Ali; Dmitry Mironov	Canada	**Matt Dunstone**; Colton Lott; Daniel Grant; Brendan MacCuish; Josh Barry
2014	Switzerland	Reto Keller; **Yannick Schwaller**; Patrick Witschonke; Michael Probst; Romano Meier	Scotland	**Kyle Smith**; Thomas Muirhead; Kyle Waddell; Cammy Smith; Duncan Menzies	Norway	**Eirik Mjøen**; Markus Skogvold; Wilhelm Næss; Gaute Nepstad; Martin Sesaker
2015	Canada	**Braden Calvert**; Kyle Kurz; Lucas van den Bosch; Brendan Wilson; Colton Lott	Switzerland	Romano Meier; **Yannick Schwaller**; Patrick Witschonke; Michael Probst; Reto Keller	Scotland	**Bruce Mouat**; Duncan Menzies; Derrick Sloan; Angus Dowell; Bobby Lammie
2016	Scotland	**Bruce Mouat**; Bobby Lammie; Gregor Cannon; Angus Dowell; Robin Brydone	United States	**Korey Dropkin**; Thomas Howell; Mark Fenner; Alex Fenson; Quinn Evenson	Canada	**Matt Dunstone**; Colton Lott; Kyle Doering; Rob Gordon; Wade Ford
2017	South Korea	**Lee Ki-jeong**; Lee Ki-bok; Seong Yu-jin; Choi Jeong-uk; Woo Gyeong-ho	United States	**Andrew Stopera**; Luc Violette; Ben Richardson; Graem Fenson; Nicholas Connolly	Norway	**Magnus Ramsfjell**; Bendik Ramsfjell; Magnus Trulsen; Eskil Vintervold; Elias Høstmælingen
2018	Canada	**Tyler Tardi**; Sterling Middleton; Jordan Tardi; Zach Curtis; Jacques Gauthier	Scotland	**Ross Whyte**; Robin Brydone; Fraser Kingan; Euan Kyle; Duncan McFadzean	Switzerland	**Jan Hess**; Simon Gloor; Simon Hoehn; Reto Schönenberger; Philipp Hösli
2019	Canada	**Tyler Tardi**; Sterling Middleton; Matthew Hall; Alex Horvath; Rylan Kleiter	Switzerland	**Marco Hösli**; Philipp Hösli; Marco Hefti; Jannis Spiess; Yves Stocker	Scotland	**Ross Whyte**; Duncan McFadzean; James Craik; Euan Kyle; Ryan McCormack
2020	Canada	**Jacques Gauthier**; Jordan Peters; Brayden Payette; Zack Bilawka; Thomas Dunlop	Switzerland	Yves Stocker; **Marco Hösli**; Felix Eberhard; Marcel Gertsch; Yves Wagenseil	Scotland	**James Craik**; Mark Watt; Blair Haswell; Niall Ryder; Angus Bryce
2021	Cancelled					
2022	Scotland	**James Craik**; Angus Bryce; Scott Hyslop; Niall Ryder; Jack Carrick	Germany	**Benjamin Kapp**; Felix Messenzehl; Johannes Scheuerl; Magnus Sutor; Klaudius Harsch	Canada	**Owen Purcell**; Joel Krats; Adam McEachren; Scott Weagle; Scott Mitchell
2023	China	**Fei Xueqing**; Guan Tianqi; Li Zhichao; Xie Xingyin; Ye Jianjun	Germany	**Benjamin Kapp**; Felix Messenzehl; Johannes Scheuerl; Mario Trevisiol; Adrian Enders	Scotland	**Orrin Carson**; Logan Carson; Archie Hyslop; Charlie Gibb; Scott Hyslop
2024	Norway	**Lukas Høstmælingen**; Tinius Haslev Nordbye; Magnus Lillebø; Eskil Eriksen; Harald Dæhlin	Italy	Francesco De Zanna; **Stefano Gilli**; Andrea Gilli; Francesco Vigilani; Alberto Cavallero	Denmark	Jonathan Vilandt; **Jacob Schmidt**; Alexander Qvist; Kasper Jurlander Bøge; Nikki Jensen
2025	Italy	**Stefano Spiller**; Stefano Gilli; Andrea Gilli; Francesco Vigliani; Cesare Spiller	Norway	**Lukas Høstmælingen**; Tinius Haslev Nordbye; Magnus Lillebø; Eskil Eriksen; Harald Dæhlin	Scotland	**Orrin Carson**; Logan Carson; Archie Hyslop; Charlie Gibb; Jake MacDonald
2026	United States	**Caden Hebert**; Jackson Bestland; Benji Paral; Jack Wendtland; Daniel Laufer	Italy	**Stefano Spiller**; Stefano Gilli; Andrea Gilli; Cesare Spiller; Francesco Vigliani	Scotland	**Orrin Carson**; Logan Carson; Archie Hyslop; Charlie Gibb; Fraser Swanston
2027						

== Medallists (Women's) ==
Women's junior world curling champions
Year	Gold		Silver		Bronze	
Year	Country	Team	Country	Team	Country	Team
1988	Canada	**Julie Sutton**; Judy Wood; Susan Auty; Marla Geiger	Switzerland	**Marianne Amstutz**; Sandra Bracher; Stephanie Walter; Franziska von Känel	Denmark	**Lene Bidstrup**; Linda Laursen; Avijaja Petri; Kinnie Steensen
1989	Canada	**LaDawn Funk**; Sandy Symyrozum; Cindy Larsen; Laurelle Funk	Norway	**Trine Helgebostad**; Cathrine Ulrichsen; Cecilie Torhaug; Darcie Skjerpen	Scotland	**Carolyn Hutchison**; Julie Hepburn; Katie Loudon; Julia Halliday
1990	Scotland	**Kirsty Addison**; Karen Addison; Joanna Pegg; Laura Scott	Sweden	**Cathrine Norberg**; Mari Högqvist; Helene Granqvist; Annica Eklund; Eva Eriksson	Canada	**Cathy Overton**; Tracy Baldwin; Carol Harvey; Tracy Bush
1991	Sweden	**Eva Eriksson**; Maria Söderkvist; Åsa Eriksson; Elisabeth de Brito; Cathrine Norberg	Switzerland	**Nicole Strausak**; Ursula Ziegler; Katja Matties; Claudia Affolter; Helga Oswald	Canada	**Atina Ford**; Darlene Kidd; Lesley Beck; Cindy Ford; Danita Michalski
1991	Sweden	**Eva Eriksson**; Maria Söderkvist; Åsa Eriksson; Elisabeth de Brito; Cathrine Norberg	Switzerland	**Nicole Strausak**; Ursula Ziegler; Katja Matties; Claudia Affolter; Helga Oswald	Scotland	**Gillian Barr**; Claire Milne; Janice Watt; Anne Laird; Peter Loudon
1992	Scotland	**Gillian Barr**; Claire Milne; Janice Watt; Nikki Mauchline; Karen Addison	United States	**Erika Brown**; Kari Liapis; Stacey Liapis; Roberta Breyen; Debbie Henry	Sweden	**Eva Eriksson**; Maria Söderkvist; Åsa Eriksson; Elisabeth de Brito; Maria Hjorth
1992	Scotland	**Gillian Barr**; Claire Milne; Janice Watt; Nikki Mauchline; Karen Addison	United States	**Erika Brown**; Kari Liapis; Stacey Liapis; Roberta Breyen; Debbie Henry	Switzerland	**Helga Oswald**; Sara Ochsner; Janine Oswald; Tatjana Stadler
1993	Scotland	**Kirsty Addison**; Gillian Barr; Joanna Pegg; Louise Wilkie; Fiona Brown	Canada	**Amber Holland**; Cindy Street; Tracy Beach; Angela Street; Marcia McKenzie	Denmark	**Dorthe Holm**; Angelina Jensen; Margit Pörtner; Helene Jensen; Kamilla Schack
1993	Scotland	**Kirsty Addison**; Gillian Barr; Joanna Pegg; Louise Wilkie; Fiona Brown	Canada	**Amber Holland**; Cindy Street; Tracy Beach; Angela Street; Marcia McKenzie	United States	**Erika Brown**; Kari Liapis; Stacey Liapis; Debbie Henry; Analissa Johnson
1994	Canada	**Kim Gellard**; Corie Beveridge; Lisa Savage; Sandy Graham; Heather Crockett	United States	**Erika Brown**; Debbie Henry; Stacey Liapis; Analissa Johnson; Allison Darragh	Denmark	**Angelina Jensen**; Dorthe Holm; Kamilla Schack; Helene Jensen; Charlotte Hedegaard
1994	Canada	**Kim Gellard**; Corie Beveridge; Lisa Savage; Sandy Graham; Heather Crockett	United States	**Erika Brown**; Debbie Henry; Stacey Liapis; Analissa Johnson; Allison Darragh	Sweden	Ulrika Bergman; **Margaretha Lindahl**; Anna Bergström; Maria Zackrisson; Maria Engholm
1995	Canada	**Kelly Mackenzie**; Joanne Fillion; Sasha Bergner; Carlene Muth; Cara Walz	Sweden	Ulrika Bergman; **Margaretha Lindahl**; Anna Bergström; Maria Zackrisson; Maria Engholm	Switzerland	**Nadia Heuer**; Laurence Défago; Carène Riedo; Céline Orizet; Brigitte Portmann
1996	Canada	**Heather Godberson**; Carmen Whyte; Kristie Moore; Terelyn Bloor; Rona McGregor	Scotland	**Julia Ewart**; Catherine Grainger; Mhairi Ferguson; Lucy Levack; Jan Byers	Sweden	Ulrika Bergman; **Margaretha Lindahl**; Maria Zackrisson; Linda Kjerr; Anna Blom
1997	Scotland	**Julia Ewart**; Michelle Silvera; Mhairi Ferguson; Lynn Cameron; Suzie Law	Sweden	Maria Engholm; **Margaretha Sigfridsson**; Anna-Kari Lindholm; Maria Halvarsson; Erika Backman	Canada	**Meredith Doyle**; Beth Roach; Tara Hamer; Candice Maclean; Nancy Toner
1998	Canada	**Melissa McClure**; Nancy Toner; Brigitte McClure; Bethany Toner; Julie Webb	Japan	**Akiko Katoh**; Yumie Hayashi; Ayumi Onodera; Mika Hori; Ai Kobayashi	Sweden	**Matilda Mattsson**; Maria Engholm; Kajsa Bergström; Lisa Löfskog; Jenny Hammarström
1999	Switzerland	**Silvana Tirinzoni**; Michèle Knobel; Brigitte Schori; Martina von Arx; Carmen Schäfer	Japan	**Akiko Katoh**; Yumie Hayashi; Ayumi Onodera; Ai Kobayashi; Shinobu Aota	Canada	**Marie-France Larouche**; Nancy Bélanger; Marie-Eve Létourneau; Valerie Grenier; Véronique Grégoire
2000	Sweden	**Matilda Mattsson**; Kajsa Bergström; Lisa Löfskog; Jenny Hammarström; Ann-Christine Nordqvist	Canada	**Stefanie Miller**; Marliese Miller; Stacy Helm; Amanda MacDonald; Beth Roach	United States	**Laura Delaney**; Nicole Joraanstad; Kirsten Finch; Rebecca Dobie; Katherine Beck
2001	Canada	**Suzanne Gaudet**; Stefanie Richard; Robyn Macphee; Kelly Higgins; Carol Webb	Sweden	**Matilda Mattsson**; Kajsa Bergström; Lisa Löfskog; Jenny Hammarström; Ann-Christine Nordqvist	Switzerland	Janine Greiner; **Carmen Schäfer**; Jacqueline Greiner; Barbara Appenzeller; Corinne Bourquin
2002	United States	**Cassandra Johnson**; Jamie Johnson; Katie Beck; Maureen Brunt; Courtney George	Sweden	**Matilda Mattsson**; Kajsa Bergström; Lisa Löfskog; Jenny Hammarström; Ann-Christine Nordqvist	Canada	**Suzanne Gaudet**; Robyn Macphee; Carol Webb; Kelly Higgins; Shelley Nicols
2003	Canada	**Marliese Miller**; Tejay Surik; Janelle Lemon; Chelsey Bell; Tammy Schneider	United States	**Cassandra Johnson**; Katherine Beck; Rebecca Dobie; Maureen Brunt; Courtney George	Italy	**Diana Gaspari**; Rosa Pompanin; Arianna Lorenzi; Lucrezia Ferrando; Anna Ghiretti
2004	Norway	**Linn Githmark**; Marianne Rørvik; Stine Moe; Åse Rommetveit Celius; Solveig Enoksen	Canada	**Jill Mouzar**; Paige Mattie; Blisse Comstock; Chloe Comstock; Robyn Mattie	Sweden	**Stina Viktorsson**; Sofie Sidén; Anna Viktorsson; Maria Wennerström; Jenny Zetterquist
2005	Switzerland	**Tania Grivel**; Anna Hügli; Stephanie Rüegsegger; Franziska Marthaler; Michèle Jäggi	Sweden	**Stina Viktorsson**; Sofie Sidén; Maria Wennerström; Jenny Zetterquist; Sabina Kraupp	Canada	**Andrea Kelly**; Kristen McDiarmid; Jodie deSolla; Lianne Sobey; Morgan Muise
2006	Russia	**Liudmila Privivkova**; Ekaterina Galkina; Margarita Fomina; Angela Tuvaeva; Daria Kozlova	Canada	**Mandy Selzer**; Erin Selzer; Kristen Mitchell; Megan Selzer; Penny Roy	Denmark	**Lene Nielsen**; Helle Simonsen; Camilla Jørgensen; Maria Poulsen; Jeanne Ellegaard
2007	Scotland	**Sarah Reid**; Eve Muirhead; Barbara McFarlane; Sarah MacIntyre; Alison Black	Canada	**Stacie Devereaux**; Stephanie Guzzwell; Sarah Paul; Julie Devereaux; Stephanie Jackson	Denmark	**Madeleine Dupont**; Jeanne Ellegaard; Mona Sylvest Nielsen; Ivana Bratic; Lisa Sylvest Nielsen
2008	Scotland	**Eve Muirhead**; Kerry Barr; Vicki Adams; Sarah MacIntyre; Kay Adams	Sweden	**Cecilia Östlund**; Sara Carlsson; Anna Domeij; Liselotta Lennartsson; Emma Berg	Canada	**Kaitlyn Lawes**; Jenna Loder; Liz Peters; Sarah Wazney; Mary Jane McKenzie
2009	Scotland	**Eve Muirhead**; Anna Sloan; Vicki Adams; Sarah MacIntyre; Kay Adams	Canada	**Kaitlyn Lawes**; Jenna Loder; Laryssa Grenkow; Breanne Meakin; Kalynn Park	Switzerland	Marisa Winkelhausen; **Martina Baumann**; Franziska Kaufmann; Isobel Kurt; Nicole Dünki
2010	Sweden	**Anna Hasselborg**; Jonna McManus; Agnes Knochenhauer; Sara McManus; Anna Huhta	Canada	**Rachel Homan**; Emma Miskew; Laura Crocker; Lynn Kreviazuk; Alison Kreviazuk	United States	**Alexandra Carlson**; Tabitha Peterson; Tara Peterson; Sophie Brorson; Miranda Solem
2011	Scotland	**Eve Muirhead**; Anna Sloan; Vicki Adams; Rhiann Macleod; Alice Spence	Canada	**Trish Paulsen**; Kari Kennedy; Kari Paulsen; Natalie Yanko; Dailene Sivertson	Russia	**Anna Sidorova**; Olga Zyablikova; Ekaterina Antonova; Galina Arsenkina; Victoria Moiseeva
2012	Scotland	**Hannah Fleming**; Lauren Gray; Alice Spence; Abigail Brown; Jennifer Martin	Czech Republic	Iveta Janatová; **Zuzana Hájková**; Klára Svatoňová; Eva Malková; Petra Vinšová	Russia	**Anna Sidorova**; Olga Zyablikova; Victoria Moiseeva; Galina Arsenkina; Alexandra Saitova
2013	Russia	Yulia Portunova; **Alina Kovaleva**; Aleksandra Saitova; Oksana Gertova; Olesia Gluschenko	Scotland	**Hannah Fleming**; Lauren Gray; Jennifer Dodds; Abi Brown; Vicky Wright	Japan	**Sayaka Yoshimura**; Rina Ida; Risa Ujihara; Mao Ishigaki; Natsuko Ishiyama
2014	Canada	**Kelsey Rocque**; Keely Brown; Taylor McDonald; Claire Tully; Alison Kotylak	South Korea	**Kim Kyeong-ae**; Kim Seon-yeong; Kim Ji-hyeon; Oh Eun-jin; Koo Young-eun	Russia	Yulia Portunova; **Alina Kovaleva**; Uliana Vasilyeva; Anastasia Bryzgalova; Anastasia Moskaleva
2015	Canada	**Kelsey Rocque**; Danielle Schmiemann; Holly Jamieson; Jessica Iles; Kristen Streifel	Scotland	**Gina Aitken**; Naomi Brown; Rowena Kerr; Rachel Hannen; Karina Aitken	Switzerland	Briar Hürlimann; **Elena Stern**; Lisa Gisler; Raphaela Keiser; Rahel Thoma
2016	Canada	**Mary Fay**; Kristin Clarke; Karlee Burgess; Janique LeBlanc; Sarah Daniels	United States	**Cory Christensen**; Sarah Anderson; Taylor Anderson; Madison Bear; Christine McMakin	South Korea	**Kim Min-ji**; Kim Hye-rin; Yang Tae-i; Oh Sun-yun; Lee Ji-young
2017	Sweden	**Isabella Wranå**; Jennie Wåhlin; Almida de Val; Fanny Sjöberg; Maria Larsson	Scotland	**Sophie Jackson**; Naomi Brown; Mili Smith; Sophie Sinclair; Laura Barr	Canada	**Kristen Streifel**; Chantele Broderson; Kate Goodhelpsen; Brenna Bilassy; Karlee Burgess
2018	Canada	**Kaitlyn Jones**; Kristin Clarke; Karlee Burgess; Lindsey Burgess; Lauren Lenentine	Sweden	**Isabella Wranå**; Jennie Wåhlin; Almida de Val; Fanny Sjöberg; Maria Larsson	China	Dong Ziqi; **Wang Zixin**; Wang Meini; Sun Chengyu; Yu Jiaxin
2019	Russia	**Vlada Rumiantseva**; Daria Morozova; Irina Riazanova; Anastasiia Mishchenko; Vera Tiuliakova	Canada	**Selena Sturmay**; Abby Marks; Kate Goodhelpsen; Paige Papley; Karlee Burgess	Switzerland	Selina Witschonke; **Raphaela Keiser**; Laura Engler; Vanessa Tonoli; Nehla Meier
2020	Canada	**Mackenzie Zacharias**; Karlee Burgess; Emily Zacharias; Lauren Lenentine; Rachel Erickson	South Korea	**Kim Min-ji**; Ha Seung-youn; Kim Hye-rin; Kim Su-jin; Yang Tae-i	Russia	**Vlada Rumiantseva**; Vera Tiuliakova; Irina Riazanova; Anastasia Mishchenko; Aleksandra Kardapoltseva
2021	Cancelled					
2022	Japan	Miyu Ueno; Eri Ogihara; Yui Ueno; **Sae Yamamoto**; Yuina Miura	Sweden	**Moa Dryburgh**; Thea Orefjord; Moa Tjärnlund; Moa Nilsson; Linda Stenlund	United States	**Delaney Strouse**; Anne O'Hara; Sydney Mullaney; Susan Dudt; Kaitlin Murphy
2023	Scotland	**Fay Henderson**; Robyn Munro; Holly Wilkie-Milne; Laura Watt; Amy Mitchell	Japan	**Yuina Miura**; Ai Matsunaga; Yui Ueno; Eri Ogihara; Yuna Sakuma	Norway	**Torild Bjørnstad**; Nora Østgård; Ingeborg Forbregd; Eilin Kjærland; Siri Østågard
2024	Switzerland	**Xenia Schwaller**; Selina Gafner; Fabienne Rieder; Selina Rychiger; Zoe Schwaller	Japan	**Momoha Tabata**; Miku Nihira; Yuina Miura; Mikoto Nakajima; Yui Ueno	Norway	**Torild Bjørnstad**; Nora Østgård; Ingeborg Forbregd; Eilin Kjærland
2025	South Korea	**Kang Bo-bae**; Kim Ji-soo; Shim Yu-jeong; Kim Min-seo; Lee Bo-young	Germany	Kim Sutor; **Sara Messenzehl**; Joy Sutor; Annelie Abdel-Halim; Emma Waltenberger	Canada	**Allyson MacNutt**; Maria Fitzgerald; Alison Umlah; Grace McCusker; Cailey Locke
2026	South Korea	**Kang Bo-bae**; Shim Yu-jeong; Lee Bo-young; Lee You-sun; Park Yea-lynn	Sweden	**Moa Dryburgh**; Moa Tjärnlund; Thea Orefjord; Maja Roxin; Erika Ryberg	China	**Wang Zhuoyi**; Mu Jiayin; Chen Zaoxue; Dong Shihan; Liu Chenxi
2027						

== Medallists (Mixed doubles) ==
Mixed doubles junior world curling champions
Year	Gold		Silver		Bronze	
Year	Country	Team	Country	Team	Country	Team
2025	Italy	Lucrezia Grande; Stefano Spiller	Denmark	Katrine Schmidt; Jacob Schmidt	South Korea	Kang Bo-bae; Kim Hak-jun
2026	Japan	Yuina Miura; Kaito Fujii	Canada	Brooklyn Ideson; Owen Henry	Scotland	Tia Laurie; Ethan Brewster
2027						

== Records ==
Most championship titles
Discipline	Curler	Country	No.	Years
Men's	Paul Gowsell	Canada	2	1976, 1978
Men's	Kelly Stearne	Canada	2	1976, 1978
Men's	James Dryburgh	Scotland	2	1991, 1996
Men's	Ronald Brewster	Scotland	2	1995–1996
Men's	David Murdoch	Scotland	2	1995–1996
Men's	John Morris	Canada	2	1998–1999
Men's	Craig Savill	Canada	2	1998–1999
Men's	Brent Laing	Canada	2	1998–1999
Men's	Andy Ormsby	Canada	2	1998–1999
Men's	Brad Gushue	Canada	2	1998, 2001
Men's	Charley Thomas	Canada	2	2006–2007
Men's	Matthew Ng	Canada	2	2006–2007
Men's	Kyle Reynolds	Canada	2	2006–2007
Men's	Geoff Walker	Canada	2	2006–2007
Men's	Tyler Tardi	Canada	2	2018–2019
Men's	Sterling Middleton	Canada	2	2018–2019
Men's	Jacques Gauthier	Canada	2	2018, 2020
Women's	Eve Muirhead	Scotland	4	2007–2009, 2011

Most championship finals
Discipline	Curler	Country	No.	Years
Men's	Nils Carlsén	Sweden	5	2002–2006
Men's	Emanuel Allberg	Sweden	5	2002–2003, 2005–2007
Women's	Eve Muirhead	Scotland	4	2007–2009, 2011
Women's	Karlee Burgess	Canada	4	2016, 2018–2020

Most championship medals
Discipline	Curler	Country	No.	Years
Men's	Nils Carlsén	Sweden	5	2002–2006
Men's	Emanuel Allberg	Sweden	5	2002–2003, 2005–2007
Women's	Karlee Burgess	Canada	5	2016–2020

Most championship appearances
Discipline	Curler	Country	No.	Years
Men's	Mikkel Krause	Denmark	7	2004–2010
Women's	Marianne Rørvik	Norway	9	1997–2005
Mixed doubles			2	2025–2026

Most titles at back-to-back events
Discipline	Curler	Country	No.	Period
Men's	Ronald Brewster	Scotland	2	1995–1996
Men's	David Murdoch	Scotland	2	1995–1996
Men's	John Morris	Canada	2	1998–1999
Men's	Craig Savill	Canada	2	1998–1999
Men's	Brent Laing	Canada	2	1998–1999
Men's	Andy Ormsby	Canada	2	1998–1999
Men's	Charley Thomas	Canada	2	2006–2007
Men's	Matthew Ng	Canada	2	2006–2007
Men's	Kyle Reynolds	Canada	2	2006–2007
Men's	Geoff Walker	Canada	2	2006–2007
Men's	Tyler Tardi	Canada	2	2018–2019
Men's	Sterling Middleton	Canada	2	2018–2019
Women's	Eve Muirhead	Scotland	3	2007–2009
Women's	Sarah MacIntyre	Scotland	3	2007–2009

Most finals at back-to-back events
Discipline	Curler	Country	No.	Period
Men's	Nils Carlsén	Sweden	5	2002–2006
Women's	Matilda Mattsson	Sweden	3	2000–2002
Women's	Kajsa Bergström	Sweden	3	2000–2002
Women's	Lisa Löfskog	Sweden	3	2000–2002
Women's	Jenny Hammarström	Sweden	3	2000–2002
Women's	Ann-Christine Nordqvist	Sweden	3	2000–2002
Women's	Eve Muirhead	Scotland	3	2007–2009
Women's	Sarah MacIntyre	Scotland	3	2007–2009
Women's	Karlee Burgess	Canada	3	2018–2020
Women's	Yui Ueno	Japan	3	2022–2024
Women's	Yuina Miura	Japan	3	2022–2024

Most medals at back-to-back events
Discipline	Curler	Country	No.	Period
Men's	Nils Carlsén	Sweden	5	2002–2006
Women's	Karlee Burgess	Canada	5	2016–2020

Most appearances at back-to-back events
Discipline	Curler	Country	No.	Period
Men's	Mikkel Krause	Denmark	7	2004–2010
Women's	Marianne Rørvik	Norway	9	1997–2005
Mixed doubles			2	2025–2026

Teams went undefeated in championship
Discipline	Year	Country	Skip	Games played
Men's	1982	Sweden	Sören Grahn	10
Men's	1989	Sweden	Peja Lindholm	11
Men's	1991	Scotland	Alan MacDougall	11
Men's	1998	Canada	John Morris	11
Women's	2003	Canada	Marliese Miller	11
Women's	2015	Canada	Kelsey Rocque	11
Women's	2024	Switzerland	Xenia Schwaller	11
Discipline	Year	Country	Curler	Games played
Mixed doubles	2025	Italy	Lucrezia Grande	9
Mixed doubles	2025	Italy	Stefano Spiller	9

== See also ==
- List of World Men's Curling Champions
- List of World Women's Curling Champions
- World Mixed Doubles Curling Championship
- List of Olympic medalists in curling
- List of Paralympic medalists in wheelchair curling
- List of European Curling Champions
- Pan Continental Curling Championships

== Notes ==
- 1991–94: Two bronze medals were awarded.
