= 2004 World Women's Curling Championship =

- Host city: Gävle, Sweden
- Arena: Gavlerinken
- Dates: April 17–25, 2004
- Winner: Canada
- Curling club: Mayflower CC, Halifax, Nova Scotia
- Skip: Colleen Jones
- Third: Kim Kelly
- Second: Mary-Anne Arsenault
- Lead: Nancy Delahunt
- Alternate: Mary Sue Radford
- Coach: Ken Bagnell
- Finalist: Norway (Dordi Nordby)

The 2004 World Women's Curling Championship (branded as 2004 Ford World Women's Curling Championship for sponsorship reasons) was held at the Gavlerinken in Gävle, Sweden from April 17–25, 2004. The tournament was held in conjunction with the 2004 World Men's Curling Championship and the 2004 World Senior Curling Championships. It was the last event held in conjunction with the men's tournament, the last to be held before the adoption of the page playoff system (before it was later replaced in 2018), and the last event to feature just ten teams.

In the final, Canada's Colleen Jones rink won their second World Championship, defeating Norway's Dordi Nordby in the final, 8–4 in front of 1,500 spectators. Jones, who had won the silver medal in 2003 decided to opt for a more offensive strategy in 2004, which helped her success. She also greatly out-curled Nordby, 89% to 49%.

Switzerland's Luzia Ebnöther won the bronze medal, defeating the US's Patti Lank rink in the third place game, 10–5.

== Teams ==
Canada	Denmark	Finland	Italy	Japan
Mayflower CC, Halifax, Nova Scotia Skip: Colleen Jones; Third: Kim Kelly; Second: Mary-Anne Arsenault; Lead: Nancy Delahunt; Alternate: Mary Sue Radford	Hvidovre CC, Hvidovre Skip: Madeleine Dupont; Third: Denise Dupont; Second: Helle Simonsen; Lead: Maria Poulsen; Alternate: Lene Nielsen	Hyvinkää CC, Hyvinkää Skip: Kirsi Nykänen*; Fourth: Tiina Kautonen; Second: Sari Laakkonen; Lead: Minna Malinen; Alternate: Riikka Louhivuori (*Throws third rocks)	New Wave CC, Cortina d'Ampezzo Skip: Diana Gaspari; Third: Giulia Lacedelli; Second: Rosa Pompanin; Lead: Violetta Caldart; Alternate: Chiara Olivieri	Kitami CC, Kitami Skip: Shinobu Aota; Third: Yukari Okazaki; Second: Eriko Minatoya; Lead: Kotomi Ishizaki; Alternate: Mari Motohashi
Norway	Scotland	Sweden	Switzerland	United States
Snarøen CC, Oslo Skip: Dordi Nordby; Third: Linn Githmark; Second: Marianne Haslum; Lead: Camilla Holth; Alternate: Marianne Rørvik	Laurencekirk CC, Aberdeen Skip: Jackie Lockhart; Third: Sheila Swan; Second: Katriona Fairweather; Lead: Anne Laird; Alternate: Kelly Wood	Härnösands CK, Härnösand Skip: Anette Norberg; Third: Eva Lund; Second: Cathrine Norberg; Lead: Anna Bergström; Alternate: Ulrika Bergman	CC Bern, Bern Skip: Luzia Ebnöther; Third: Carmen Küng; Second: Tanya Frei; Lead: Nadia Röthlisberger-Raspe; Alternate: Laurence Bidaud	Niagara Falls CC, Niagara Falls, Ontario Skip: Patti Lank; Third: Erika Brown; Second: Nicole Joraanstad; Lead: Natalie Nicholson; Alternate: Barb Perrella

== Round robin standings ==
Key
Teams to playoffs
Teams to tiebreaker

Country	Skip	W	L
Norway	Dordi Nordby	7	2
Canada	Colleen Jones	6	3
Switzerland	Luzia Ebnöther	6	3
United States	Patti Lank	5	4
Scotland	Jackie Lockhart	5	4
Sweden	Anette Norberg	5	4
Japan	Shinobu Aota	4	5
Italy	Diana Gaspari	3	6
Denmark	Madeleine Dupont	3	6
Finland	Kirsi Nykänen	1	8

== Round robin results ==
=== Draw 1 ===
April 17, 2004 09:00

Sheet A	1	2	3	4	5	6	7	8	9	10	Final
Switzerland (Ebnöther)	0	0	0	0	1	0	0	0	0	0	1
Canada (Jones) 🔨	0	0	0	1	0	1	1	1	1	1	6

Sheet B	1	2	3	4	5	6	7	8	9	10	Final
Italy (Gaspari)	0	0	1	0	1	0	0	1	0	X	3
Norway (Nordby) 🔨	0	1	0	2	0	2	1	0	2	X	8

Sheet C	1	2	3	4	5	6	7	8	9	10	Final
Japan (Aota) 🔨	0	2	0	3	1	0	0	0	3	0	9
Sweden (Norberg)	0	0	4	0	0	2	0	4	0	2	12

Sheet D	1	2	3	4	5	6	7	8	9	10	Final
Denmark (Dupont)	0	0	1	2	0	2	1	0	2	2	10
Finland (Nykänen) 🔨	1	1	0	0	1	0	0	2	0	0	5

Sheet E	1	2	3	4	5	6	7	8	9	10	Final
Scotland (Lockhart)	0	1	0	2	1	0	2	0	1	0	7
United States (Lank) 🔨	1	0	1	0	0	2	0	4	0	1	9

=== Draw 2 ===
April 17, 2004 18:30

Sheet A	1	2	3	4	5	6	7	8	9	10	Final
Finland (Nykänen) 🔨	2	1	0	0	1	3	0	0	1	0	8
Norway (Nordby)	0	0	3	1	0	0	1	2	0	2	9

Sheet B	1	2	3	4	5	6	7	8	9	10	Final
United States (Lank)	0	1	1	0	2	1	0	3	0	1	9
Japan (Aota) 🔨	1	0	0	2	0	0	1	0	2	0	6

Sheet C	1	2	3	4	5	6	7	8	9	10	Final
Switzerland (Ebnöther) 🔨	2	0	1	0	0	0	1	0	1	1	6
Italy (Gaspari)	0	1	0	1	1	1	0	1	0	0	5

Sheet D	1	2	3	4	5	6	7	8	9	10	Final
Sweden (Norberg) 🔨	0	1	1	0	0	2	0	2	0	0	6
Scotland (Lockhart)	0	0	0	1	1	0	2	0	3	1	8

Sheet E	1	2	3	4	5	6	7	8	9	10	Final
Canada (Jones) 🔨	0	2	0	0	0	0	1	0	3	0	6
Denmark (Dupont)	1	0	0	0	1	1	0	2	0	3	8

=== Draw 3 ===
April 18, 2004 12:00

Sheet A	1	2	3	4	5	6	7	8	9	10	Final
Japan (Aota) 🔨	1	0	3	0	1	0	0	1	0	0	6
Switzerland (Ebnöther)	0	2	0	1	0	1	0	0	2	1	7

Sheet B	1	2	3	4	5	6	7	8	9	10	Final
Sweden (Norberg)	1	0	0	2	0	2	1	0	0	1	7
Denmark (Dupont) 🔨	0	0	2	0	1	0	0	2	1	0	6

Sheet C	1	2	3	4	5	6	7	8	9	10	11	Final
Norway (Nordby) 🔨	0	1	1	1	0	2	0	0	2	0	0	7
Scotland (Lockhart)	0	0	0	0	1	0	2	3	0	1	1	8

Sheet D	1	2	3	4	5	6	7	8	9	10	Final
United States (Lank) 🔨	0	2	1	0	0	1	2	0	4	X	10
Canada (Jones)	1	0	0	0	1	0	0	2	0	X	4

Sheet E	1	2	3	4	5	6	7	8	9	10	Final
Italy (Gaspari) 🔨	0	3	1	0	1	0	3	0	1	1	10
Finland (Nykänen)	2	0	0	1	0	3	0	2	0	0	8

=== Draw 4 ===
4/18/2004 20:00

Sheet A	1	2	3	4	5	6	7	8	9	10	Final
Canada (Jones) 🔨	0	0	2	1	2	0	2	1	X	X	8
Italy (Gaspari)	1	0	0	0	0	1	0	0	X	X	2

Sheet B	1	2	3	4	5	6	7	8	9	10	Final
Scotland (Lockhart) 🔨	2	0	0	1	1	0	1	1	0	1	7
Switzerland (Ebnöther)	0	2	1	0	0	1	0	0	2	0	6

Sheet C	1	2	3	4	5	6	7	8	9	10	Final
Finland (Nykänen)	0	0	0	0	0	1	X	X	X	X	1
United States (Lank) 🔨	2	1	2	3	3	0	X	X	X	X	11

Sheet D	1	2	3	4	5	6	7	8	9	10	Final
Norway (Nordby) 🔨	0	2	0	0	1	0	0	0	0	2	5
Sweden (Norberg)	0	0	0	1	0	1	0	0	1	0	3

Sheet E	1	2	3	4	5	6	7	8	9	10	Final
Denmark (Dupont) 🔨	0	1	0	0	1	0	2	0	X	X	4
Japan (Aota)	0	0	4	1	0	1	0	3	X	X	9

=== Draw 5 ===
April 19, 2004 14:00

Sheet A	1	2	3	4	5	6	7	8	9	10	Final
Sweden (Norberg) 🔨	0	2	0	0	2	0	0	0	4	X	8
United States (Lank)	0	0	1	1	0	1	0	0	0	X	3

Sheet B	1	2	3	4	5	6	7	8	9	10	Final
Denmark (Dupont)	0	1	0	0	1	1	0	0	X	X	3
Italy (Gaspari) 🔨	2	0	2	1	0	0	2	1	X	X	8

Sheet C	1	2	3	4	5	6	7	8	9	10	Final
Scotland (Lockhart)	0	1	0	0	1	0	0	0	3	0	5
Japan (Aota)	0	0	1	1	0	1	0	1	0	4	8

Sheet D	1	2	3	4	5	6	7	8	9	10	Final
Finland (Nykänen) 🔨	2	0	1	0	0	0	3	0	0	0	6
Switzerland (Ebnöther)	0	1	0	2	1	3	0	2	1	1	11

Sheet E	1	2	3	4	5	6	7	8	9	10	Final
Norway (Nordby) 🔨	1	0	0	0	0	1	0	1	1	1	5
Canada (Jones)	0	2	1	1	1	0	2	0	0	0	7

=== Draw 6 ===
April 20, 2004 08:30

Sheet A	1	2	3	4	5	6	7	8	9	10	11	Final
Scotland (Lockhart) 🔨	1	0	1	0	0	2	0	1	0	1	0	6
Finland (Nykänen)	0	1	0	1	1	0	1	0	2	0	2	8

Sheet B	1	2	3	4	5	6	7	8	9	10	Final
Norway (Nordby)	1	0	0	3	0	1	0	1	0	2	8
United States (Lank) 🔨	0	2	1	0	1	0	1	0	1	0	6

Sheet C	1	2	3	4	5	6	7	8	9	10	Final
Denmark (Dupont) 🔨	0	0	0	1	0	0	0	1	X	X	2
Switzerland (Ebnöther)	0	1	0	0	0	4	3	0	X	X	8

Sheet D	1	2	3	4	5	6	7	8	9	10	Final
Canada (Jones)	0	1	0	3	0	0	1	1	0	1	7
Japan (Aota) 🔨	1	0	1	0	1	1	0	0	1	0	5

Sheet E	1	2	3	4	5	6	7	8	9	10	Final
Sweden (Norberg) 🔨	0	1	0	2	0	2	0	1	3	X	9
Italy (Gaspari)	0	0	0	0	1	0	1	0	0	X	2

=== Draw 7 ===
April 20, 2004 19:00

Sheet A	1	2	3	4	5	6	7	8	9	10	Final
Norway (Nordby) 🔨	2	1	0	4	0	0	2	X	X	X	9
Denmark (Dupont)	0	0	0	0	1	1	0	X	X	X	2

Sheet B	1	2	3	4	5	6	7	8	9	10	11	Final
Japan (Aota)	0	2	0	0	0	2	1	0	0	1	1	7
Finland (Nykänen) 🔨	1	0	2	1	1	0	0	1	0	0	0	6

Sheet C	1	2	3	4	5	6	7	8	9	10	Final
Sweden (Norberg) 🔨	0	2	0	2	0	2	1	0	1	0	8
Canada (Jones)	0	0	3	0	3	0	0	1	0	2	9

Sheet D	1	2	3	4	5	6	7	8	9	10	Final
Scotland (Lockhart) 🔨	1	0	2	1	2	1	0	1	X	X	8
Italy (Gaspari)	0	2	0	0	0	0	1	0	X	X	3

Sheet E	1	2	3	4	5	6	7	8	9	10	Final
United States (Lank)	0	0	2	1	0	0	1	0	1	X	5
Switzerland (Ebnöther) 🔨	1	2	0	0	2	2	0	2	0	X	9

=== Draw 8 ===
April 21, 2004 14:00

Sheet A	1	2	3	4	5	6	7	8	9	10	Final
Italy (Gaspari) 🔨	2	0	1	0	0	2	0	0	2	1	7
Japan (Aota)	0	2	0	2	0	0	2	4	0	0	10

Sheet B	1	2	3	4	5	6	7	8	9	10	Final
Canada (Jones) 🔨	1	1	0	0	2	1	0	0	0	0	5
Scotland (Lockhart)	0	0	1	1	0	0	1	1	1	1	6

Sheet C	1	2	3	4	5	6	7	8	9	10	Final
United States (Lank) 🔨	0	3	0	3	0	3	0	1	X	X	10
Denmark (Dupont)	0	0	1	0	2	0	1	0	X	X	4

Sheet D	1	2	3	4	5	6	7	8	9	10	Final
Switzerland (Ebnöther) 🔨	0	0	1	0	1	0	0	X	X	X	2
Norway (Nordby)	0	3	0	1	0	3	1	X	X	X	8

Sheet E	1	2	3	4	5	6	7	8	9	10	Final
Finland (Nykänen) 🔨	0	2	1	0	0	0	X	X	X	X	3
Sweden (Norberg)	1	0	0	3	3	3	X	X	X	X	10

=== Draw 9 ===
April 22, 2004 08:30

Sheet A	1	2	3	4	5	6	7	8	9	10	11	Final
Denmark (Dupont) 🔨	0	1	3	0	0	0	0	0	0	1	1	6
Scotland (Lockhart)	0	0	0	2	1	0	1	0	1	0	0	5

Sheet B	1	2	3	4	5	6	7	8	9	10	11	Final
Switzerland (Ebnöther) 🔨	0	1	0	0	1	0	1	0	2	0	1	6
Sweden (Norberg)	0	0	0	2	0	1	0	1	0	1	0	5

Sheet C	1	2	3	4	5	6	7	8	9	10	Final
Canada (Jones) 🔨	1	0	1	0	3	0	0	0	6	X	11
Finland (Nykänen)	0	1	0	1	0	0	0	1	0	X	3

Sheet D	1	2	3	4	5	6	7	8	9	10	Final
Italy (Gaspari) 🔨	0	0	1	0	1	0	3	0	0	2	7
United States (Lank)	0	1	0	1	0	3	0	1	0	0	6

Sheet E	1	2	3	4	5	6	7	8	9	10	Final
Japan (Aota) 🔨	0	2	0	0	0	1	0	0	2	1	6
Norway (Nordby)	0	0	1	2	2	0	1	1	0	0	7

== Tiebreakers ==
=== Tiebreaker 1 ===
April 22, 2004 17:00

Sheet C	1	2	3	4	5	6	7	8	9	10	Final
Sweden (Norberg)	0	1	0	1	0	3	0	0	2	0	7
Scotland (Lockhart) 🔨	1	0	3	0	1	0	1	2	0	1	9

Player Percentages
Sweden		Scotland	
Anette Norberg	61%	Jackie Lockhart	79%
Eva Lund	93%	Kelly Wood	78%
Cathrine Norberg	68%	Katriona Fairweather	60%
Anna Bergström	78%	Anne Laird	61%
Total	75%	Total	64%

=== Tiebreaker 2 ===
April 23, 2004 09:00

Sheet B	1	2	3	4	5	6	7	8	9	10	Final
United States (Lank) 🔨	1	0	1	1	0	1	0	0	0	3	7
Scotland (Lockhart)	0	2	0	0	1	0	0	1	0	0	4

Player Percentages
United States		Scotland	
Patti Lank	69%	Jackie Lockhart	89%
Erika Brown	80%	Kelly Wood	81%
Nicole Joraanstad	74%	Katriona Fairweather	65%
Natalie Nicholson	75%	Anne Laird	71%
Total	72%	Total	71%

== Playoffs ==
=== Brackets ===
Semifinals
4	United States	7
1	Norway	8
3	Switzerland	6
2	Canada	8

Final
1	Norway	4
2	Canada	8
Bronze medal
3	Switzerland	10
4	United States	5

=== Semifinals ===
April 23, 2004 19:00

Sheet C	1	2	3	4	5	6	7	8	9	10	11	Final
United States (Lank)	0	2	0	2	0	1	0	1	1	0	0	7
Norway (Nordby) 🔨	1	0	1	0	2	0	1	0	0	2	1	8

Player Percentages
United States		Norway	
Patti Lank	68%	Dordi Nordby	65%
Erika Brown	80%	Linn Githmark	69%
Nicole Joraanstad	78%	Marianne Haslum	68%
Natalie Nicholson	80%	Camilla Holth	65%
Total	77%	Total	67%

Sheet C	1	2	3	4	5	6	7	8	9	10	Final
Switzerland (Ebnöther)	0	0	2	0	2	1	0	1	0	0	6
Canada (Jones) 🔨	0	1	0	2	0	0	1	0	3	1	8

Player Percentages
Switzerland		Canada	
Luzia Ebnöther	60%	Colleen Jones	71%
Carmen Küng	66%	Kim Kelly	75%
Tanya Frei	81%	Mary-Anne Arsenault	65%
Nadia Röthlisberger-Raspe	88%	Nancy Delahunt	89%
Total	74%	Total	75%

=== Bronze medal game ===
April 24, 2004 09:30

Sheet B	1	2	3	4	5	6	7	8	9	10	Final
Switzerland (Ebnöther)	0	2	0	1	1	1	0	0	5	X	10
United States (Lank) 🔨	1	0	2	0	0	0	1	1	0	X	5

Player Percentages
Switzerland		United States	
Luzia Ebnöther	79%	Patti Lank	61%
Carmen Küng	72%	Erika Brown	51%
Tanya Frei	75%	Nicole Joraanstad	61%
Nadia Röthlisberger-Raspe	68%	Natalie Nicholson	68%
Total	74%	Total	60%

=== Gold medal game ===
April 24, 2004 17:30

Sheet C	1	2	3	4	5	6	7	8	9	10	Final
Norway (Nordby) 🔨	0	1	0	0	1	0	1	0	1	0	4
Canada (Jones)	1	0	2	1	0	2	0	1	0	1	8

Player Percentages
Norway		Canada	
Dordi Nordby	49%	Colleen Jones	89%
Linn Githmark	81%	Kim Kelly	75%
Marianne Haslum	83%	Mary-Anne Arsenault	84%
Camilla Holth	85%	Nancy Delahunt	83%
Total	80%	Total	83%

== Player percentages ==
Leads	%	Seconds	%	Thirds	%	Skips	%
(Denmark) Maria Poulsen	86	(Canada) Mary-Anne Arsenault	79	(United States) Erika Brown	75	(Sweden) Anette Norberg	75
(Sweden) Anna Bergström	83	(Norway) Marianne Haslum	76	(Norway) Linn Githmark	74	(Canada) Colleen Jones	73
(Japan) Kotomi Ishizaki	80	(Denmark) Helle Simonsen	75	(Japan) Yukari Okazaki	74	(United States) Patti Lank	72
(United States) Natalie Nicholson	79	(Sweden) Cathrine Norberg	74	(Sweden) Eva Lund	74	(Scotland) Jackie Lockhart	72
(Canada) Nancy Delahunt	78	(Scotland) Katriona Fairweather	72	(Denmark) Denise Dupont	72	(Japan) Shinobu Aota	71

== Sources ==
- "Ford World Curling Championships 2004". World Curling Federation. Archived from the original on 2012-04-01.
