= Sheila Swan =

Scottish curler

- Curler ♀
- Born: 9 December 1978 (age 47); Perth, Scotland

Team
- Curling club: Laurencekirk CC, Aberdeen, Glenfarn Ladies, Perth

Curling career
- Member Association: Scotland
- World Championship: 3 (2002, 2004, 2005)
- European Championship: 2 (2002, 2004)
Medal record
Curling
World Championships
Gold medal – first place	2002 Bismarck
Scottish Women's Championship
Gold medal – first place	2002
Gold medal – first place	2004
Gold medal – first place	2005

Sheila Swan (born 9 December 1978 in Perth, Scotland) is a Scottish curler and curling coach, a 2002 World champion.

She is head coach of British wheelchair curling.

== Teams ==
Season	Skip	Third	Second	Lead	Alternate	Coach	Events
2001–02	Jackie Lockhart	Sheila Swan	Katriona Fairweather	Anne Laird	Edith Loudon		SWCC 2002 (gold); WCC 2002 (gold)
2002–03	Jackie Lockhart	Sheila Swan	Katriona Fairweather	Anne Laird	Edith Loudon	Isobel Hannen	ECC 2002 (6th)
2003–04	Jackie Lockhart	Sheila Swan	Katriona Fairweather	Anne Laird	Kelly Wood	Isobel Hannen	CCC 2003 (gold); SWCC 2004 (gold); WCC 2004 (5th)
2004–05	Kelly Wood	Lorna Vevers	Sheila Swan	Lindsay Wood	Claire Milne (ECC, WCC)	Chris Hildrey (ECC), Mike Hay (WCC)	ECC 2004 (5th); SWCC 2005 (gold); WCC 2005 (6th)
2005–06	Edith Loudon	Mairi Milne	Sheila Swan	Katie Loudon			SWCC 2006 (4th)
Mixed curling
2005–06	Keith Prentice	Sheila Swan	Neil Macarthur	Rosemary Arkley			SMxCC 2006 (silver)

== Record as a coach of national teams ==
Year	Tournament, event	National team	Place
2004	2004 World Junior Curling Championships	Scotland (junior women)	7
2007	2007 Winter Universiade	United Kingdom (women)	10
2007	2007 World Junior Curling Championships	Scotland (junior women)	1st place, gold medalist(s)
2009	2009 World Wheelchair Curling Championship	Scotland (wheelchair)	5
2011	2011 World Wheelchair Curling Championship	Scotland (wheelchair)	2nd place, silver medalist(s)
2015	2015 World Wheelchair Curling B-Championship	Scotland (wheelchair)	5
2016	2016 World Wheelchair Curling B-Championship	Scotland (wheelchair)	2nd place, silver medalist(s)
2017	2017 World Wheelchair Curling Championship	Scotland (wheelchair)	3rd place, bronze medalist(s)
2018	2018 Winter Paralympics	United Kingdom (wheelchair)	7
2019	2019 World Wheelchair Curling Championship	Scotland (wheelchair)	2nd place, silver medalist(s)
2020	2020 World Wheelchair Curling Championship	Scotland (wheelchair)	9
2021	2021 World Wheelchair Curling Championship	Scotland (wheelchair)	6
2022	2022 World Wheelchair Mixed Doubles Curling Championship	Scotland (wheelchair mixed double)	14
