= Susanne Slotsager =

Danish curler

- Curler ♀
- Born: 29 April 1966 (age 60); Hørsholm, Denmark

Team
- Curling club: Hvidovre CC, Hvidovre

Curling career
- Member Association: Denmark
- World Championship: 5 (1992, 1999, 2000, 2001, 2002)
- European Championship: 5 (1991, 1992, 1999, 2000, 2001)
- Olympic: 2 (1992 (demo), 2002)
Medal record
Curling
World Championships
Bronze medal – third place	1999 Saint John
Bronze medal – third place	2001 Lausanne
European Championships
Silver medal – second place	2001 Vierumäki
Danish Women's Championship
Gold medal – first place	1992
Gold medal – first place	1999
Gold medal – first place	2000
Gold medal – first place	2001
Gold medal – first place	2002

Susanne Kit Nissen Pottier Slotsager (born 29 April 1966) is a Danish female curler.

She is a two-time World women's bronze medallist and 2001 European silver medallist.

She is a participant of the 1992 Winter Olympics (where curling was a demonstration sport) and the 2002 Winter Olympics.

== Teams ==
Season	Skip	Third	Second	Lead	Alternate	Coach	Events
1984–85	Susanne Slotsager	Linda Laursen	Avijaja Petri	Kinnie Leth Steensen			DJCC 1985 (gold)
1984–85	Susanne Slotsager	Linda Laursen	Avijaja Petri	Annette Lindum			EJCC 1985 (5th)
1985–86	Susanne Slotsager	Lene Bidstrup	Avijaja Petri	Kinnie Leth Steensen			DJCC 1986 (gold)
1985–86	Susanne Slotsager	Lene Bidstrup	Avijaja Petri	Linda Laursen			EJCC 1986 (5th)
1991–92	Helena Blach	Lene Bidstrup	Malene Krause	Susanne Slotsager	Dorthe Holm (ECC)		ECC 1991 (4th); DWCC 1992 (gold)
1991–92	Helena Blach	Malene Krause	Lene Bidstrup	Susanne Slotsager	Dorthe Holm (WOG)		WOG 1992 (demo) (4th); WCC 1992 (7th)
1992–93	Helena Blach	Lene Bidstrup	Malene Krause	Susanne Slotsager			ECC 1992 (7th)
1998–99	Lene Bidstrup	Malene Krause	Susanne Slotsager	Avijaja Petri	Lilian Frøhling	Jane Bidstrup	DWCC 1999 (gold); WCC 1999 (bronze)
1999–00	Lene Bidstrup	Malene Krause	Susanne Slotsager	Avijaja Petri	Lisa Richardson	Olle Brudsten	ECC 1999 (6th); DWCC 2000 (gold); WCC 2000 (6th)
2000–01	Lene Bidstrup	Malene Krause	Susanne Slotsager	Avijaja Lund Nielsen	Lisa Richardson	Olle Brudsten (ECC), Frants Gufler (WCC)	ECC 2000 (6th); DWCC 2001 (gold); WCC 2001 (bronze)
2001–02	Lene Bidstrup	Susanne Slotsager	Malene Krause	Avijaja Lund Nielsen	Lisa Richardson (ECC, WOG); Jane Bidstrup (WCC)	Hans Gufler (ECC); Olle Brudsten (WOG, WCC)	ECC 2001 (silver); DWCC 2002 (gold); WOG 2002 (9th); WCC 2002 (6th)
2018–19	Lene Bidstrup Nyboe	Susanne Slotsager	Trine Qvist	Lillian Frøhling Hansen		Gabriella Qvist	WSCC 2019 (silver)
