= 1986 Canadian Junior Men's Curling Championship =

The 1986 Pepsi Canadian Junior Men's Curling Championship was held February 16-22 at the Red Deer Curling Club in Red Deer, Alberta.

Team Manitoba, skipped by future Manitoba Leader of the Opposition Hugh McFadyen and his teammates Jon Mead, Norman Gould, John Lange defeated Saskatchewan in the final, to claim the province's fourth provincial men's junior title. The team would go on to win a silver medal for Canada at the 1987 World Junior Curling Championships.

It would be the last year where the men's and women's junior tournaments would be held at separate times.

== Round-robin standings ==
Key
Teams to Playoffs
Teams to Tiebreakers

Team	Skip	Locale	W	L
Manitoba	Hugh McFadyen	Winnipeg	11	0
Saskatchewan	Kelly Vollman	Kronau	9	2
Alberta	Trenton McQuarrie	Lethbridge	8	3
British Columbia	Graeme Franklin	Richmond	8	3
Quebec	René Lanteigne	Laval	7	4
Ontario	Michael Harris	Toronto	6	5
Northern Ontario	Gary Champagne	Thunder Bay	4	7
Nova Scotia	Jeff Hopkins	Bridgewater	4	7
Prince Edward Island	James McCarthy	Charlottetown	4	7
Yukon/Northwest Territories	Chad Cowan	Whitehorse	2	9
New Brunswick	Tim Comeau	Grand Falls	2	9
Newfoundland	Paul Rogers	Baie Verte	1	10

== Playoffs ==
Tiebreaker		Semifinal		Final
Alberta	6
British Columbia	4	Saskatchewan	6
		Alberta	4
				Manitoba	7
				Saskatchewan	5
