= Annette Jörnlind =

Swedish female curler

- Curler ♀
- Born: 1 May 1967 (age 59); Västerås, Sweden

Team
- Curling club: Sundsvalls CK, Svegs CK

Curling career
- Member Association: Sweden
- World Championship: 2 (1996, 2002)
Medal record
Curling
World Championships
Silver medal – second place	2002 Esbjerg

Annette Feldt Jörnlind (born 1 May 1962 in Västerås, Sweden) is a Swedish female curler.

She is a 2002 World silver medallist.

== Teams ==
=== Women's ===
Season	Skip	Third	Second	Lead	Alternate	Coach	Events
1998–99	Margaretha Sigfridsson	Maria Engholm	Annette Jörnlind	Anna-Kari Lindholm			
2001–02	Maria Engholm (fourth)	Margaretha Sigfridsson (skip)	Annette Jörnlind	Anna-Kari Lindholm	Ulrika Bergman	Andreas Prytz	WCC 2002 (silver)
2002–03	Margaretha Sigfridsson	Maria Engholm	Margaretha Dryburgh	Annette Jörnlind			

=== Mixed ===
Season	Skip	Third	Second	Lead	Events
2002–03	Annette Jörnlind	Thomas Feldt	Helen Edlund	Olle Jörnlind	SMxCC 2003 (bronze)
2013–14	Thomas Feldt	Annette Feldt Jörnlind	Roine Söderlund	Helen Edlund	SMxCC 2014 (13th)

=== Mixed doubles ===
Season	Female	Male	Events
2011–12	Annette Jörnlind	Thomas Feldt	SMDCC 2012 (9th)

== Personal life ==
Annette Jörnlind married fellow curler Thomas Feldt in 2006.
