= 2002 World Women's Curling Championship =

- Host city: Bismarck, North Dakota
- Arena: Bismarck Civic Center
- Dates: April 6-14, 2002
- Winner: Scotland
- Curling club: Laurencekirk CC, Aberdeen
- Skip: Jackie Lockhart
- Third: Sheila Swan
- Second: Katriona Fairweather
- Lead: Anne Laird
- Alternate: Edith Loudon
- Finalist: Sweden (Margaretha Sigfridsson)

The 2002 World Women's Curling Championship (branded as 2002 Ford World Women's Curling Championship for sponsorship reasons) was held April 6-14, 2002 at the Bismarck Civic Center in Bismarck, North Dakota.

== Teams ==
Canada	Denmark	Germany	Norway	Russia
Mayflower CC, Halifax, Nova Scotia Skip: Colleen Jones; Third: Kim Kelly; Second: Mary-Anne Waye; Lead: Nancy Delahunt; Alternate: Laine Peters	Hvidovre CC, Hvidovre Skip: Lene Bidstrup; Third: Susanne Slotsager; Second: Malene Krause; Lead: Avijaja Lund Nielsen; Alternate: Jane Bidstrup	SC Riessersee, Garmisch-Partenkirchen Skip: Natalie Nessler; Third: Sabine Belkofer; Second: Heike Schwaller; Lead: Andrea Stock; Alternate: Katja Weisser	Snarøen CC, Oslo Skip: Dordi Nordby; Third: Hanne Woods; Second: Marianne Haslum; Lead: Camilla Holth; Alternate: Trine Trulsen Vågberg	Moskvitch CC, Moscow Skip: Olga Jarkova; Third: Nkeiruka Ezekh; Second: Yana Nekrasova; Lead: Anastassia Skoultan; Alternate: Angela Tuvaeva
Scotland	South Korea	Sweden	Switzerland	United States
Laurencekirk CC, Aberdeen Skip: Jackie Lockhart; Third: Sheila Swan; Second: Katriona Fairweather; Lead: Anne Laird; Alternate: Edith Loudon	Seoul CC, Seoul Skip: Kim Mi-yeon; Third: Lee Hyun-jung; Second: Shin Mi-sung; Lead: Park Ji-hyun	Svegs CK Fourth: Maria Engholm; Skip: Margaretha Sigfridsson; Second: Annette Jörnlind; Lead: Anna-Kari Lindholm; Alternate: Ulrika Bergman	Zug CC, Zug Skip: Manuela Kormann; Third: Andrea Stöckli; Second: Christina Schönbächler; Lead: Jeannine Probst; Alternate: Pascale Zenerino	Madison CC, Madison Skip: Patti Lank; Third: Erika Brown Oriedo; Second: Allison Pottinger; Lead: Natalie Nicholson; Alternate: Nicole Joraanstad

== Round-robin standings ==
Key
Teams to Playoffs
Teams to Tiebreakers

Country	Skip	W	L
Scotland	Jackie Lockhart	7	2
Sweden	Margaretha Sigfridsson	6	3
Norway	Dordi Nordby	6	3
Canada	Colleen Jones	5	4
Denmark	Lene Bidstrup	5	4
Switzerland	Manuela Kormann	5	4
Russia	Olga Jarkova	4	5
United States	Patti Lank	4	5
Germany	Natalie Neßler	3	6
South Korea (Note: First appearance)	Kim Mi-yeon	0	9

== Round-robin results ==
All draw times are listed in Central Time (UTC−05:00).

=== Draw 1 ===
Saturday, April 6, 7:30 am

Sheet A	1	2	3	4	5	6	7	8	9	10	Final
Switzerland (Kormann)	0	0	0	0	2	0	0	1	1	0	4
Canada (Jones) 🔨	1	0	0	2	0	2	1	0	0	1	7

Sheet B	1	2	3	4	5	6	7	8	9	10	Final
United States (Lank) 🔨	0	0	0	0	4	0	0	1	0	0	5
Denmark (Bidstrup)	1	1	2	0	0	1	1	0	1	2	9

Sheet C	1	2	3	4	5	6	7	8	9	10	Final
Sweden (Sigfridsson)	0	1	1	0	3	0	0	0	2	0	7
South Korea (Kim) 🔨	0	0	0	1	0	1	0	0	0	1	3

Sheet D	1	2	3	4	5	6	7	8	9	10	Final
Norway (Nordby)	0	2	0	1	0	0	1	1	0	1	6
Germany (Neßler) 🔨	1	0	1	0	0	1	0	0	1	0	4

Sheet E	1	2	3	4	5	6	7	8	9	10	Final
Scotland (Lockhart) 🔨	1	1	0	2	0	1	0	2	0	5	12
Russia (Jarkova)	0	0	1	0	1	0	1	0	2	0	5

=== Draw 2 ===
Saturday, April 6, 4:30 pm

Sheet A	1	2	3	4	5	6	7	8	9	10	Final
Scotland (Lockhart) 🔨	0	0	0	2	1	0	3	3	X	X	9
United States (Lank)	0	1	0	0	0	1	0	0	X	X	2

Sheet B	1	2	3	4	5	6	7	8	9	10	Final
South Korea (Kim) 🔨	0	2	0	1	0	1	0	1	0	X	5
Russia (Jarkova)	0	0	2	0	3	0	5	0	3	X	13

Sheet C	1	2	3	4	5	6	7	8	9	10	Final
Switzerland (Kormann) 🔨	2	0	2	0	0	1	1	0	2	0	8
Norway (Nordby)	0	1	0	2	1	0	0	1	0	1	6

Sheet D	1	2	3	4	5	6	7	8	9	10	Final
Sweden (Sigfridsson) 🔨	1	0	1	1	0	1	0	0	1	0	5
Canada (Jones)	0	2	0	0	2	0	0	1	0	1	6

Sheet E	1	2	3	4	5	6	7	8	9	10	Final
Denmark (Bidstrup) 🔨	0	0	1	1	0	0	1	0	4	1	8
Germany (Neßler)	1	0	0	0	2	1	0	3	0	0	7

=== Draw 3 ===
Sunday, April 7, 9:30 am

Sheet A	1	2	3	4	5	6	7	8	9	10	Final
Germany (Neßler) 🔨	1	0	1	1	0	0	1	0	1	0	5
Russia (Jarkova)	0	2	0	0	0	3	0	3	0	1	9

Sheet B	1	2	3	4	5	6	7	8	9	10	Final
Canada (Jones) 🔨	0	1	0	1	0	0	1	1	0	0	4
Norway (Nordby)	1	0	1	0	2	1	0	0	1	3	9

Sheet C	1	2	3	4	5	6	7	8	9	10	Final
Denmark (Bidstrup)	0	1	0	0	0	1	X	X	X	X	2
Scotland (Lockhart) 🔨	2	0	2	2	2	0	X	X	X	X	8

Sheet D	1	2	3	4	5	6	7	8	9	10	Final
South Korea (Kim) 🔨	0	2	0	1	0	1	0	1	0	0	5
Switzerland (Kormann)	0	0	4	0	3	0	1	0	2	2	12

Sheet E	1	2	3	4	5	6	7	8	9	10	Final
Sweden (Sigfridsson)	0	1	0	1	0	0	0	X	X	X	2
United States (Lank) 🔨	1	0	2	0	3	4	1	X	X	X	11

=== Draw 4 ===
Sunday, April 7, 7:00 pm

Sheet A	1	2	3	4	5	6	7	8	9	10	Final
Canada (Jones)	0	2	0	1	0	0	2	0	1	0	6
Denmark (Bidstrup) 🔨	1	0	2	0	2	2	0	1	0	1	9

Sheet B	1	2	3	4	5	6	7	8	9	10	Final
Sweden (Sigfridsson)	2	0	1	0	0	3	0	0	2	1	9
Switzerland (Kormann) 🔨	0	1	0	1	2	0	1	0	0	0	5

Sheet C	1	2	3	4	5	6	7	8	9	10	Final
United States (Lank)	0	0	2	0	0	1	0	3	0	0	6
Russia (Jarkova) 🔨	2	1	0	3	1	0	1	0	1	1	10

Sheet D	1	2	3	4	5	6	7	8	9	10	Final
Germany (Neßler) 🔨	0	0	1	0	0	0	2	1	1	0	5
Scotland (Lockhart)	0	0	0	2	1	2	0	0	0	1	6

Sheet E	1	2	3	4	5	6	7	8	9	10	Final
Norway (Nordby) 🔨	2	1	1	0	7	0	X	X	X	X	11
South Korea (Kim)	0	0	0	1	0	1	X	X	X	X	2

=== Draw 5 ===
Monday, April 8, 2:00 pm

Sheet A	1	2	3	4	5	6	7	8	9	10	Final
Sweden (Sigfridsson) 🔨	3	0	3	0	1	0	0	2	0	1	10
Scotland (Lockhart)	0	1	0	2	0	2	2	0	1	0	8

Sheet B	1	2	3	4	5	6	7	8	9	10	Final
Denmark (Bidstrup)	0	1	0	0	1	0	0	5	0	0	7
South Korea (Kim) 🔨	0	0	0	1	0	2	1	0	1	1	6

Sheet C	1	2	3	4	5	6	7	8	9	10	Final
Canada (Jones) 🔨	1	0	1	0	1	0	0	0	X	X	3
Germany (Neßler)	0	3	0	1	0	1	3	1	X	X	9

Sheet D	1	2	3	4	5	6	7	8	9	10	Final
United States (Lank) 🔨	0	0	0	0	0	1	1	0	X	X	2
Norway (Nordby)	3	1	1	1	1	0	0	3	X	X	10

Sheet E	1	2	3	4	5	6	7	8	9	10	11	Final
Russia (Jarkova) 🔨	3	0	0	1	0	0	2	0	0	1	2	9
Switzerland (Kormann)	0	2	0	0	2	0	0	2	1	0	0	7

=== Draw 6 ===
Tuesday, April 9, 9:30 am

Sheet A	1	2	3	4	5	6	7	8	9	10	Final
Russia (Jarkova)	0	0	0	0	0	1	0	1	0	0	2
Norway (Nordby) 🔨	0	1	1	0	0	0	3	0	0	1	6

Sheet B	1	2	3	4	5	6	7	8	9	10	Final
Switzerland (Kormann) 🔨	2	1	0	3	2	0	1	3	X	X	12
Germany (Neßler)	0	0	1	0	0	2	0	0	X	X	3

Sheet C	1	2	3	4	5	6	7	8	9	10	Final
South Korea (Kim)	0	1	0	1	0	0	2	0	2	1	7
United States (Lank) 🔨	2	0	3	0	2	1	0	1	0	0	9

Sheet D	1	2	3	4	5	6	7	8	9	10	11	Final
Denmark (Bidstrup) 🔨	1	3	0	2	0	0	0	0	0	1	0	7
Sweden (Sigfridsson)	0	0	2	0	2	2	1	0	0	0	1	8

Sheet E	1	2	3	4	5	6	7	8	9	10	Final
Canada (Jones)	0	0	0	1	0	1	0	0	2	0	4
Scotland (Lockhart) 🔨	0	1	1	0	1	0	1	0	0	2	6

=== Draw 7 ===
Tuesday, April 9, 7:00 pm

Sheet A	1	2	3	4	5	6	7	8	9	10	Final
United States (Lank)	0	0	0	2	1	1	0	2	1	0	7
Switzerland (Kormann) 🔨	0	2	2	0	0	0	1	0	0	1	6

Sheet B	1	2	3	4	5	6	7	8	9	10	11	Final
Russia (Jarkova) 🔨	1	0	2	1	0	1	0	1	0	1	0	7
Canada (Jones)	0	2	0	0	2	0	1	0	2	0	1	8

Sheet C	1	2	3	4	5	6	7	8	9	10	Final
Norway (Nordby) 🔨	3	0	0	1	0	0	2	0	2	1	9
Denmark (Bidstrup)	0	1	1	0	0	1	0	2	0	0	5

Sheet D	1	2	3	4	5	6	7	8	9	10	Final
Scotland (Lockhart)	1	0	0	1	0	0	0	2	0	1	5
South Korea (Kim) 🔨	0	0	1	0	1	0	1	0	1	0	4

Sheet E	1	2	3	4	5	6	7	8	9	10	Final
Germany (Neßler) 🔨	0	1	0	0	0	2	0	1	2	1	7
Sweden (Sigfridsson)	0	0	0	2	0	0	2	0	0	0	4

=== Draw 8 ===
Wednesday, April 10, 2:00 pm

Sheet A	1	2	3	4	5	6	7	8	9	10	Final
South Korea (Kim)	0	0	0	1	0	0	2	0	1	X	4
Germany (Neßler) 🔨	1	1	1	0	1	1	0	3	0	X	8

Sheet B	1	2	3	4	5	6	7	8	9	10	11	Final
Norway (Nordby)	1	0	0	1	0	3	1	0	0	0	0	6
Scotland (Lockhart) 🔨	0	2	0	0	1	0	0	1	1	1	1	7

Sheet C	1	2	3	4	5	6	7	8	9	10	Final
Russia (Jarkova)	0	0	2	0	1	0	2	0	0	2	7
Sweden (Sigfridsson) 🔨	0	2	0	2	0	1	0	2	1	0	8

Sheet D	1	2	3	4	5	6	7	8	9	10	Final
Canada (Jones) 🔨	1	0	2	0	1	0	1	0	0	1	6
United States (Lank)	0	1	0	1	0	1	0	1	0	0	4

Sheet E	1	2	3	4	5	6	7	8	9	10	Final
Switzerland (Kormann)	0	1	0	1	1	2	1	1	0	0	7
Denmark (Bidstrup) 🔨	1	0	1	0	0	0	0	0	2	1	5

=== Draw 9 ===
Tuesday, April 11, 9:30 am

Sheet A	1	2	3	4	5	6	7	8	9	10	Final
Norway (Nordby)	0	1	0	1	0	0	0	1	0	0	3
Sweden (Sigfridsson) 🔨	0	0	1	0	1	1	1	0	2	1	7

Sheet B	1	2	3	4	5	6	7	8	9	10	Final
Germany (Neßler)	0	1	0	0	0	0	1	0	X	X	2
United States (Lank) 🔨	1	0	2	0	0	1	0	4	X	X	8

Sheet C	1	2	3	4	5	6	7	8	9	10	Final
Scotland (Lockhart) 🔨	1	0	0	0	1	0	1	0	2	0	5
Switzerland (Kormann)	0	3	0	1	0	2	0	2	0	1	9

Sheet D	1	2	3	4	5	6	7	8	9	10	Final
Russia (Jarkova) 🔨	1	0	1	0	0	1	0	1	1	0	5
Denmark (Bidstrup)	0	2	0	2	0	0	2	0	0	2	8

Sheet E	1	2	3	4	5	6	7	8	9	10	Final
South Korea (Kim)	0	0	3	0	1	0	1	0	1	0	6
Canada (Jones) 🔨	0	3	0	2	0	1	0	1	0	1	8

== Tiebreakers ==
Semifinals			To Semifinal
			1	Canada	5
2	Denmark	5		Switzerland	4
3	Switzerland	10

=== Tiebreaker 1 ===
Thursday, April 11, 6:00 pm

Sheet E	1	2	3	4	5	6	7	8	9	10	Final
Denmark (Bidstrup)	0	0	1	0	0	3	0	1	0	X	5
Switzerland (Kormann) 🔨	0	2	0	2	1	0	2	0	3	X	10

Player percentages
Denmark		Switzerland	
Avijaja Lund Nielsen	92%	Jeannine Probst	74%
Malene Krause	74%	Christina Schönbächler	88%
Susanne Slotsager	68%	Andrea Stöckli	57%
Lene Bidstrup	81%	Manuela Kormann	90%
Total	79%	Total	77%

=== Tiebreaker 2 ===
Friday, April 12, 9:30 am

Sheet D	1	2	3	4	5	6	7	8	9	10	11	Final
Canada (Jones) 🔨	1	0	0	1	0	0	1	0	2	0	1	6
Switzerland (Kormann)	0	1	0	0	2	0	0	1	0	1	0	5

Player percentages
Canada		Switzerland	
Nancy Delahunt	82%	Jeannine Probst	90%
Mary-Anne Arsenault	83%	Christina Schönbächler	81%
Kim Kelly	84%	Andrea Stöckli	81%
Colleen Jones	86%	Manuela Kormann	91%
Total	84%	Total	86%

== Playoffs ==
Semifinal
1	Scotland	5
4	Canada	4
2	Sweden	7
3	Norway	6

Gold Medal Game
1	Scotland	6
2	Sweden	5
Bronze Medal Game
4	Canada	6
3	Norway	9

=== Semifinal 1 ===
Friday, April 12, 2:00 pm

Sheet B	1	2	3	4	5	6	7	8	9	10	Final
Sweden (Sigfridsson) 🔨	0	1	0	1	0	1	0	2	0	2	7
Norway (Nordby)	0	0	1	0	2	0	1	0	2	0	6

Player percentages
Sweden		Norway	
Anna-Kari Lindholm	83%	Camilla Holth	73%
Annette Jörnlind	68%	Marianne Haslum	84%
Margaretha Sigfridsson	84%	Hanne Woods	84%
Maria Engholm	79%	Dordi Nordby	91%
Total	79%	Total	83%

=== Semifinal 2 ===
Friday, April 12, 7:00 pm

Sheet B	1	2	3	4	5	6	7	8	9	10	11	Final
Scotland (Lockhart) 🔨	0	1	0	0	1	0	1	0	1	0	1	5
Canada (Jones)	0	0	1	0	0	1	0	1	0	1	0	4

Player percentages
Scotland		Canada	
Anne Laird	73%	Nancy Delahunt	93%
Katriona Fairweather	83%	Mary-Anne Arsenault	69%
Sheila Swan	83%	Kim Kelly	89%
Jackie Lockhart	70%	Colleen Jones	72%
Total	77%	Total	81%

=== Bronze medal game ===
Saturday, April 13, 8:30 am

Sheet C	1	2	3	4	5	6	7	8	9	10	Final
Canada (Jones) 🔨	1	0	3	2	0	0	0	0	0	0	6
Norway (Nordby)	0	1	0	0	1	1	1	3	1	1	9

Player percentages
Canada		Norway	
Nancy Delahunt	86%	Camilla Holth	83%
Mary-Anne Arsenault	73%	Marianne Haslum	86%
Kim Kelly	86%	Hanne Woods	83%
Colleen Jones	61%	Dordi Nordby	59%
Total	77%	Total	78%

=== Gold medal game ===
Saturday, April 13, 1:00 pm

Sheet C	1	2	3	4	5	6	7	8	9	10	Final
Scotland (Lockhart) 🔨	0	0	0	0	0	3	0	2	0	1	6
Sweden (Sigfridsson)	0	0	0	1	0	0	3	0	1	0	5

Player percentages
Scotland		Sweden	
Anne Laird	81%	Anna-Kari Lindholm	89%
Katriona Fairweather	69%	Annette Jörnlind	79%
Sheila Swan	76%	Margaretha Sigfridsson	73%
Jackie Lockhart	74%	Maria Engholm	69%
Total	75%	Total	78%

== Top 5 player percentages ==
After Round Robin; minimum 5 games

Leads	%
(Canada) Nancy Delahunt	83
(Scotland) Anne Laird	83
(Denmark) Avijaja Lund Nielsen	82
(Switzerland) Jeannine Probst	77
(United States) Natalie Nicholson	75

Seconds	%
(Scotland) Katriona Fairweather	78
(Denmark) Malene Krause	77
(Switzerland) Christina Schönbächler	77
(Germany) Heike Schwaller	75
(United States) Allison Pottinger	75

Thirds	%
(Canada) Kim Kelly	81
(Switzerland) Andrea Stöckli	74
(Russia) Nkeirouka Ezekh	73
(Norway) Hanne Woods	73
(United States) Erika Brown Oriedo	73

Skips	%
(Switzerland) Manuela Kormann	80
(Scotland) Jackie Lockhart	77
(Canada) Colleen Jones	76
(Denmark) Lene Bidstrup	75
(Russia) Olga Jarkova	72
