= Katriona Fairweather =

Scottish curler

- Curler ♀
- Born: 24 May 1978 (age 48)

Team
- Curling club: Laurencekirk CC, Aberdeen, Airleywight Ladies CC, Perth

Curling career
- Member Association: Scotland
- World Championship: 2 (2002, 2004)
- European Championship: 1 (2002)
- Other appearances: World Junior Championships: 1 (1998)
Medal record
Curling
World Championships
Gold medal – first place	2002 Bismarck
Scottish Women's Championship
Gold medal – first place	2002
Gold medal – first place	2004

Katriona Fairweather (born 24 May 1978) is a Scottish curler, a 2002 World champion. In marriage she also known as Katriona Davidson.

== Teams ==
Season	Skip	Third	Second	Lead	Alternate	Coach	Events
1997–98	Julia Ewart	Michelle Silvera	Lynn Cameron	Kirsty Drummond	Katriona Fairweather	Peter Loudon	WJCC 1998 (4th)
2001–02	Jackie Lockhart	Sheila Swan	Katriona Fairweather	Anne Laird	Edith Loudon		SWCC 2002 (gold); WCC 2002 (gold)
2002–03	Jackie Lockhart	Sheila Swan	Katriona Fairweather	Anne Laird	Edith Loudon	Isobel Hannen	ECC 2002 (6th)
2003–04	Jackie Lockhart	Sheila Swan	Katriona Fairweather	Anne Laird	Kelly Wood	Isobel Hannen	CCC 2003 (gold); SWCC 2004 (gold); WCC 2004 (5th)
