= Anna-Kari Lindholm =

Swedish curler

- Curler ♀
- Born: 3 November 1976 (age 50); Sveg, Sweden

Team
- Curling club: Svegs CK

Curling career
- Member Association: Sweden
- World Championship: 1 (2002)
- Other appearances: World Junior Championships: 1 (1997)
Medal record
Curling
World Championships
Silver medal – second place	2002 Esbjerg
World Junior Championships
Silver medal – second place	1997 Karuizawa

Anna-Kari Lindholm Berglund (born 3 November 1976 in Sveg, Sweden) is a Swedish female curler.

She is a 2002 World silver medallist.

== Teams ==
Season	Skip	Third	Second	Lead	Alternate	Coach	Events
1996–97	Maria Engholm (fourth)	Margaretha Sigfridsson (skip)	Anna-Kari Lindholm	Maria Halvarsson	Erika Backman		SJCC 1997 (gold); WJCC 1997 (silver)
1997–98	Margaretha Sigfridsson	Maria Engholm	Anna-Kari Lindholm	Mari-Louise Persson			
1998–99	Margaretha Sigfridsson	Maria Engholm	Annette Jörnlind	Anna-Kari Lindholm			
2001–02	Maria Engholm (fourth)	Margaretha Sigfridsson (skip)	Annette Jörnlind	Anna-Kari Lindholm	Ulrika Bergman	Andreas Prytz	WCC 2002 (silver)
