= Avijaja Lund Järund =

Danish female curler and coach (1966)

- Curler ♀
- Born: 6 December 1966 (age 59); Qaqortoq, Kujalleq, Greenland, Denmark

Team
- Curling club: Hvidovre CC, Hvidovre

Curling career
- Member Association: Denmark
- World Championship: 4 (1999, 2000, 2001, 2002)
- European Championship: 3 (1999, 2000, 2001)
- Olympic: 1 (2002)
- Other appearances: World Junior Championships: 1 (1988)
Medal record
Curling
Representing Denmark
World Championships
Bronze medal – third place	1999 Saint John
Bronze medal – third place	2001 Lausanne
European Championships
Silver medal – second place	2001 Vierumäki
Danish Women's Championship
Gold medal – first place	1999
Gold medal – first place	2000
Gold medal – first place	2001
Gold medal – first place	2002
World Junior Championships
Bronze medal – third place	1988 Chamonix

Avijaja "Avi" Lund Järund (born 6 December 1966, as Avijaja Petri) is a Danish female curler and curling coach. Also known as Avijaja "Avi" Lund, Avijaja Lund Nielsen, Avijaja Nielsen.

She is a two-time World women's bronze medallist and 2001 European silver medallist.

She is a participant of the 2002 Winter Olympics.

== Teams ==
Season	Skip	Third	Second	Lead	Alternate	Coach	Events
1984–85	Susanne Slotsager	Linda Laursen	Avijaja Petri	Kinnie Leth Steensen			DJCC 1985 (gold)
1984–85	Susanne Slotsager	Linda Laursen	Avijaja Petri	Annette Lindum			EJCC 1985 (5th)
1985–86	Susanne Slotsager	Lene Bidstrup	Avijaja Petri	Kinnie Leth Steensen			DJCC 1986 (gold)
1985–86	Susanne Slotsager	Lene Bidstrup	Avijaja Petri	Linda Laursen			EJCC 1986 (5th)
1987–88	Lene Bidstrup	Linda Laursen	Avijaja Nielsen	Kinnie Steensen			DJCC 1988 (gold); WJCC 1988 (bronze)
1998–99	Lene Bidstrup	Malene Krause	Susanne Slotsager	Avijaja Petri	Lilian Frøhling	Jane Bidstrup	DWCC 1999 (gold); WCC 1999 (bronze)
1999-00	Lene Bidstrup	Malene Krause	Susanne Slotsager	Avijaja Petri	Lisa Richardson	Olle Brudsten	ECC 1999 (6th); DWCC 2000 (gold); WCC 2000 (6th)
2000–01	Lene Bidstrup	Malene Krause	Susanne Slotsager	Avijaja Lund Nielsen	Lisa Richardson	Olle Brudsten (ECC); Frants Gufler (WCC)	ECC 2000 (6th); DWCC 2001 (gold); WCC 2001 (bronze)
2001–02	Lene Bidstrup	Susanne Slotsager	Malene Krause	Avijaja Lund Nielsen	Lisa Richardson (ECC, WOG); Jane Bidstrup (WCC)	Hans Gufler (ECC); Olle Brudsten (WOG, WCC)	ECC 2001 (silver); DWCC 2002 (gold); WOG 2002 (9th); WCC 2002 (6th)

== Record as a coach of national teams ==
Year	Tournament, event	National team	Place
2004	2004 European Curling Championships	Denmark (men)	6
2005	2005 European Curling Championships	Denmark (men)	6
2005	2005 European Curling Championships	Denmark (women)	3rd place, bronze medalist(s)
2006	2006 Winter Olympics	Denmark (women)	8
