= Anna Le Moine =

Swedish curler and Olympic gold medalist

- Curler
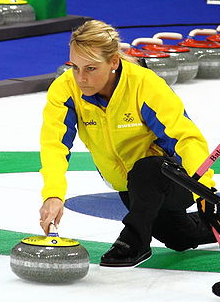
- Le Moine at the 2010 Winter Olympics
- Other names: Anna Svärd
- Born: Anna Bergström; 30 October 1973 (age 53); Sveg, Sweden
Medal record
Women's curling
Representing Sweden
Olympic Games
Gold medal – first place	2006 Turin	Women's
Gold medal – first place	2010 Vancouver	Women's
World Championships
Gold medal – first place	2005 Paisley	Women's
Gold medal – first place	2006 Grande Prairie	Women's
European Championships
Gold medal – first place	2003 Courmayeur	Team
Gold medal – first place	2004 Sofia	Team
Gold medal – first place	2005 Garmisch-Partenkirchen	Team
Gold medal – first place	2007 Füssen	Team
Silver medal – second place	1999 Chamonix	Team
Silver medal – second place	2008 Härnösand	Team
World Junior Championships
Silver medal – second place	1995 Perth	Team
Bronze medal – third place	1994 Sofia	Team

Anna Maria Le Moine (born 30 October 1973 as Anna Bergström; also formerly known as Anna Svärd), is a Swedish curler. At the 2006 Winter Olympics in Turin, Italy and 2010 Winter Olympics in Vancouver, Canada, she was the lead for the Swedish team who won the gold-medal. She lives in Stockholm, and plays for Härnösands CK, Härnösand. Le Moine starred, as well as her teammates, in the videoclip "Hearts on Fire" by the Swedish metal band HammerFall.

In 2004 she was inducted into the Swedish Curling Hall of Fame.

== Teammates ==
2006 Torino Olympic Games

Anette Norberg, Skip

Eva Lund, Third

Cathrine Lindahl, Second

Ulrika Bergman, Alternate

2010 Vancouver Olympic Games

Anette Norberg, Skip

Eva Lund, Third

Cathrine Lindahl, Second

Kajsa Bergström, Alternate
