= Ronnie Napier =

Scottish curler (born 1963)

John Ronald Napier (born 21 August 1963) is a Scottish curler from St. Andrews. Napier has curled in the Olympics once for the Douglas Dryburgh team representing Great Britain in the 1998 Winter Olympics. Ronnie and his team came in sixth place out of ten teams. Managing to beat Japan and Denmark as well as two other teams in the process.
