= Sebastian Linkemann =

German curler

- Curler ♂

Team
- Curling club: CC Füssen, Füssen

Curling career
- Member Association: Germany
- World Championship: 1 (1999)
- Other appearances: World Junior Championships: 3 (1995, 1996, 1997)
Medal record
Curling
World Junior Championships
Silver medal – second place	1995 Perth
Bronze medal – third place	1996 Red Deer

Sebastian Linkemann is a German curler.

== Teams ==
Season	Skip	Third	Second	Lead	Alternate	Coach	Events
1994–95	Daniel Herberg	Sebastian Stock	Stephan Wiedemann	Patrick Hoffman	Sebastian Linkemann		WJCC 1995 (silver)
1995–96	Sebastian Stock	Patrick Hoffman	Stephan Wiedemann	Sebastian Linkemann	Sebastian Jacoby		WJCC 1996 (bronze)
1996–97	Sebastian Stock	Sebastian Jacoby	Stephan Wiedemann	Sebastian Linkemann'	Christopher Bartsch		WJCC 1997 (6th)
1998–99	Andy Kapp	Uli Kapp	Oliver Axnick	Holger Höhne	Sebastian Linkemann	Keith Wendorf	WCC 1999 (7th)
