= Hugh McFadyen =

Canadian politician

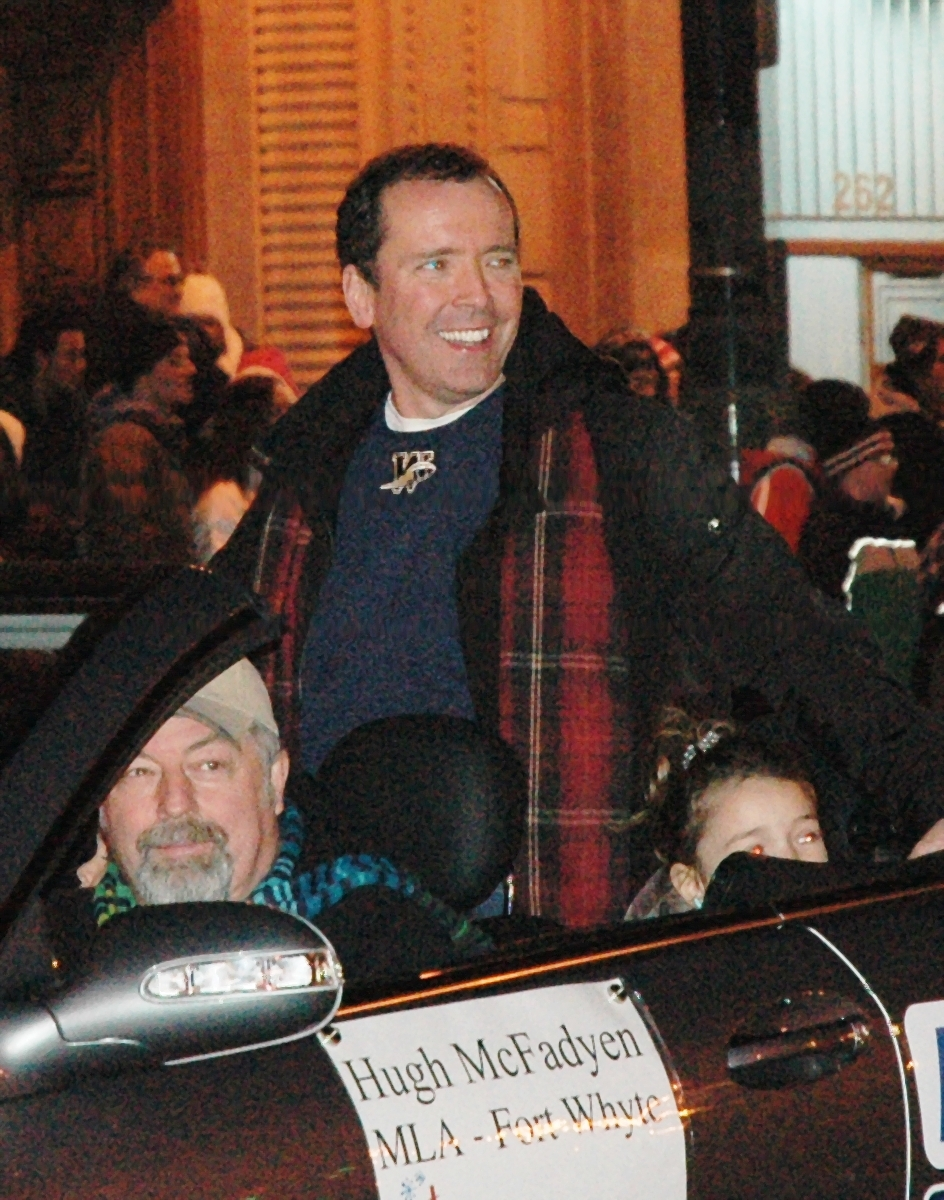

Leader of the Opposition in Manitoba
- In office April 26, 2006 – July 30, 2012
- Preceded by: Stuart Murray
- Succeeded by: Brian Pallister

Leader of the Progressive Conservative Party of Manitoba
- In office April 29, 2006 – July 30, 2012
- Preceded by: Stuart Murray
- Succeeded by: Brian Pallister

Member of the Legislative Assembly of Manitoba for Fort Whyte
- In office December 13, 2005 – July 30, 2012
- Preceded by: John Loewen
- Succeeded by: Brian Pallister

Personal details
- Born: May 31, 1967 (age 59) Selkirk, Manitoba, Canada
- Party: Progressive Conservative
- Education: University of Manitoba (B.A.) (LL.B.); University College London

Hugh Daniel McFadyen (born May 31, 1967) is a lawyer and politician in Manitoba, Canada. From 2006 to 2012, he was the leader of the Progressive Conservative Party of Manitoba, and Leader of the Opposition in the Manitoba legislature.

Following his party's loss in the 2011 election he announced that he would resign as leader as soon as a new leader is appointed. McFadyen officially resigned on 30 July 2012.

== Early life and career ==
McFadyen was born in Selkirk, Manitoba. His aunt Linda McIntosh was a cabinet minister in the provincial government of Gary Filmon, and his great-grandfather and great-great-grandfather were also members of the Manitoba legislature. He has said that former Manitoba Premier Duff Roblin is his political hero.

Hugh McFadyen
Medal record

Curling

World Junior Championships
Silver medal – second place	1987 Victoria	

McFadyen was a successful curler in his youth, and skipped his team to a Canadian Junior Championship in 1986. This win qualified them for the 1987 World Junior Curling Championships where they won a silver medal, losing to Scotland's Douglas Dryburgh. McFadyen's third, Jon Mead, would go on to play for Jeff Stoughton, while his second, Norman Gould, went on to curling success in Japan followed by coaching the 1996 Jeff Stoughton World Championship Curling Team.

McFadyen holds Bachelor of Arts (1990) and Bachelor of Laws (1993) degrees from the University of Manitoba. He was a researcher for the Progressive Conservative Party of Manitoba in the mid-1990s, and was appointed principal secretary to Premier Gary Filmon following Taras Sokolyk's resignation in September 1998 following the Aboriginal vote splitting scandal. McFadyen represented Filmon as an observer to the federal United Alternative convention, and was deputy campaign manager for the Progressive Conservatives in the 1999 provincial election.

The Progressive Conservatives lost the 1999 election, and McFadyen's position in the Office of the Premier ended with the Filmon government's resignation shortly thereafter. He subsequently practiced law for two years in London, UK with Clifford Chance LLP, did post-graduate work at University College London, and worked for a consulting firm in Toronto. He returned to Manitoba in 2003, and joined the firm Aikins, MacAulay & Thorvaldson. In early 2004, he became the Manitoba chair of Belinda Stronach's bid to lead the newly formed Conservative Party of Canada.

McFadyen managed Sam Katz's successful campaign to become Mayor of Winnipeg in mid-2004, in a municipal by-election that followed the resignation of Glen Murray. Katz later appointed McFadyen as his senior political advisor.

== Politician ==
=== Member of the Legislative Assembly ===
McFadyen resigned as advisor to the mayor in May 2005, in order to seek the federal Conservative Party nomination for Winnipeg South. He defeated rival candidate Rod Bruinooge by only twelve votes at the nomination meeting. When the federal election was deferred, McFadyen was hired by provincial Progressive Conservative leader Stuart Murray as a consultant on urban issues. The Progressive Conservatives were the Official Opposition party in this period, having lost a second election to the New Democratic Party under Gary Doer in 2003.

Later in 2005, McFadyen resigned his federal nomination to seek the Progressive Conservative nomination for a provincial by-election in Fort Whyte. He was supported by Gary Filmon, and again defeated Bruinooge for the nomination. Fort Whyte is a safe Progressive Conservative seat, and McFadyen was elected without difficulty in December.

Stuart Murray announced his resignation as Progressive Conservative leader in November 2005, after receiving a lukewarm endorsement at the party's annual convention. McFadyen was soon mentioned as a possible successor, even before his election to the legislature. In February 2006, he became the first candidate to officially declare for the party leadership. His campaign was supported by fourteen MLAs, including Jack Reimer, Kelvin Goertzen and Cliff Cullen, as well as former cabinet ministers Rosemary Vodrey, David Newman, Jim Downey and Shirley Render. He defeated rival candidates Ron Schuler and Ken Waddell on 29 April 2006.

=== Leader of the Progressive Conservative Party ===
McFadyen's first months as party leader were successful. The Progressive Conservatives surpassed the NDP in public opinion polls in June 2006, for the first time since 1999. McFadyen strongly criticized the Doer government over its alleged failure to protect investors from the failure of the Crocus Investment Fund, and launched a party task force into the matter headed by former cabinet minister Don Orchard. He also advocated fixed provincial election dates, and accused Doer of failing to keep an earlier pledge to end "hallway medicine" in the province.

In late 2006, McFadyen reversed his party's former position and promised to continue Manitoba's tuition freeze if elected as Premier. He also promised compensation for investors in the Crocus fund and financial incentives for Manitobans buying energy-efficient cars, raised the prospect of sharing the provincial sales tax with cities, and argued that parents who allow their children to wander the streets at night should be held responsible if their children commit crimes.

During a speech in September 2006, McFadyen described the former New Democratic Party government of Howard Pawley as having been influenced by communism. This statement was widely criticized, and Pawley described it as "fallacious and ridiculous". McFadyen initially refused to withdraw the accusation, and said that there had been card-carrying members of the Communist Party in Pawley's government. (This was undoubtedly a reference to Roland Penner, a former member of the communist Labor-Progressive Party who served in Pawley's cabinet during the 1980s. Penner indicated that he had left the LPP in 1960, several years before he ran as an NDP candidate.)

In March 2007, McFadyen introduced a ten-point plan designed to make Manitoba Hydro a major player in the clean energy sector. The proposal was dismissed by the NDP as a thinly veiled plan to privatize the utility, a charge that McFadyen denied.

=== 2007 election ===
The Doer government called a new election for 22 May 2007. McFadyen's campaign was centred on five themes: better health care, a cleaner environment, law and order, improving Winnipeg's image, and keeping younger Manitobans in the province. He also promised to cut the provincial sales tax from 7% to 6%, cut the education portion of property taxes by half within six years, and introduce other tax cuts amounting to $172 million. On criminal justice, McFadyen promised to fund 350 new police officers and non-uniformed "crimefighters", give the police a direct role in choosing judges. He also promised to deny legal aid to persons previously convicted of drug trafficking, benefiting from the proceeds of crime, or being part of a criminal organization. Provincial Justice Minister Dave Chomiak described the latter promise as a "publicity stunt" that would ultimately cost the province money, while the Winnipeg Free Press described it as "bizarre". McFadyen also promised to bring the Jets hockey team back to Winnipeg, in order to convince younger Manitobans to remain in the province. This was generally regarded as unrealistic in newspaper coverage.

Support for the Progressive Conservatives fell significantly in the last days of the campaign, particularly among female voters. Doer's New Democrats won a third consecutive majority government, while McFadyen's Progressive Conservatives retained Official Opposition status with nineteen seats, down one from the previous election. He was personally returned for Fort Whyte without difficulty.

== Post-election ==
After the election, rumours surfaced that McFadyen would be pressured to stand down as party leader. He rejected the suggestion, and observed that the Progressive Conservatives would need to make significant changes to regain their former status as Manitoba's governing party. In early 2008, he said that his party should emulate the changes brought to the UK Conservative Party by newly elected leader David Cameron.

In September 2007, McFadyen took part in an all-party delegation to Ottawa, calling on the federal government to increase penalties for car thieves, young offenders and criminal gangs. He recommended changes to the Child and Family Services Act in late 2007, arguing that child safety should be the sole consideration when determining if a child should be assigned to the care of social workers. He argued that the existing act was confusing, and allowed for too many other considerations.

In late 2007, McFadyen criticized the Doer government for its decision to construct a hydroelectric transmission line on the west rather than the east side of Lake Winnipeg. The east side route would be less expensive, but was rejected on the grounds that it was opposed by local indigenous groups and would threaten pristine boreal forest lands. McFadyen described the west side line as the greatest policy blunder in Manitoba history, and said that some indigenous leaders have been given effective veto power over development. Ron Evans, Grand Chief of the Assembly of Manitoba Chiefs and a former Progressive Conservative candidate, responded that McFadyen's comments threaten to damage years of work between his party and the indigenous community.

McFadyen led the Progressive Conservatives in the 2011 general election, in which the party failed to make any gains, ending up with nineteen seats for the second election in a row. He announced his resignation as party leader in his concession speech. McFayden now works at a public relations firm in Calgary, Alberta.

== Electoral record ==
2011 Manitoba general election: Fort Whyte
Party	Candidate	Votes	%	±%	Expenditures
Progressive Conservative	Hugh McFadyen	5,594	62.44	+10.49	$23,755.75
New Democratic	Sunny Dhaliwal	2,655	29.64	−4.20	$99.38
Liberal	Chae Tsai	710	7.92	−6.29	$829.64
Total valid votes		8,959	99.51		
Rejected and declined votes		44	0.49	+0.16	
Turnout		9,003	61.91	+2.76	
Electors on the lists		14,542			
Progressive Conservative hold		Swing		+7.34	
Source: Elections Manitoba

2007 Manitoba general election: Fort Whyte
Party	Candidate	Votes	%	±%	Expenditures
Progressive Conservative	Hugh McFadyen	5,981	51.95	−0.31	$20,363.37
New Democratic	Sunny Dhaliwal	3,895	33.83	+9.40	$5,331.36
Liberal	Angelina Olivier-Job	1,637	14.22	−7.41	$2,162.37
Total valid votes		11,513	99.67		
Rejected and declined votes		38	0.33	+0.24	
Turnout		11,551	59.15	+21.08	
Electors on the lists		19,527			
Progressive Conservative hold		Swing		-4.90	

Manitoba provincial by-election, December 16, 2005: Fort Whyte Resignation of John Loewen
Party	Candidate	Votes	%	±%	Expenditures
Progressive Conservative	Hugh McFadyen	3,542	52.26	−0.45	$27,219.00
New Democratic	Christina McDonald	1,650	24.34	−3.79	$18,333.89
Liberal	Jean Paterson	1,466	21.63	+2.47	$6,134.47
Green	Shelagh Pizey-Allen	120	1.77	–	$233.71
Total valid votes		6,778	99.91		
Rejected ballots		6	0.09	-0.17	
Turnout		6,784	38.07	−18.54	
Registered voters		17,820			
Progressive Conservative hold		Swing		+1.67	

All electoral information is taken from Elections Manitoba. Provincial expenditures refer to candidate expenses.
