= Kajsa Bergström =

Swedish curler

Personal information
- Nationality: (Sweden) Swedish
- Born: 3 January 1981 (age 45) Sveg, Sweden

Sport
- Sport: Curling
- Club: Sveg CK
Medal record
Curling
Representing Sweden
Olympic Games
Gold medal – first place	2010 Vancouver	Women's
World Curling Championships
Silver medal – second place	2009 Gangneung	Women's
European Championships
Silver medal – second place	2008 Örnsköldsvik	Team
World Junior Championships
Gold medal – first place	2000 Geising	Team
Silver medal – second place	2001 Ogden	Team
Silver medal – second place	2002 Kelowna	Team
Bronze medal – third place	1998 Thunder Bay	Team

Kajsa Magdalena Bergström (born 3 January 1981) is a Swedish curler. The younger sister of curler Anna Le Moine, she has skipped for the club Sveg CK for the past two years.

Bergström played on the Swedish team in the 2009 Mount Titlis World Women's Curling Championship and was the alternate for the gold-medal winning Swedish women's curling team at the 2010 Vancouver Olympic Games.

== Teammates ==
2009 Gangneung World Championships

2010 Vancouver Olympic Games

Anette Norberg, Skip

Eva Lund, Third

Cathrine Lindahl, Second

Anna Le Moine, Lead
