= 1987 World Junior Curling Championships =

- Host city: Esquimalt, British Columbia, Canada
- Dates: March 15–21
- Men's winner: Scotland (4th title)
- Skip: Douglas Dryburgh
- Third: Philip Wilson
- Second: Lindsay Clark
- Lead: Billy Andrew
- Finalist: Canada (Hugh McFadyen)

The 1987 World Junior Curling Championships were held from March 15 to 21 at the Esquimalt Sports Centre Arena in Esquimalt, British Columbia, Canada. The tournament only consisted of a men's event.

== Teams ==
Country	Skip	Third	Second	Lead	Curling club
Canada	Hugh McFadyen	Jonathan Mead	Norman Gould	John Lange	
Denmark	Jørgen Larsen	Michael Peterson	Carsten Nyboe	Brian Enggaard	
France	Pascal Thiriot	Franck Marot	David Gruget	Eric Thiriot	
West Germany	Andy Kapp	Florian Zörgiebel	Cristopher Huber	Ulrich Schneider	
Italy	Stefano Ferronato	Gianluca Lorenzi	Elio Maran	Marco Alberti	
Norway	Anthon Grimsmo	Tore Torvbråten	Jan Thoresen	Dag Skjelstad	
Scotland	Douglas Dryburgh	Philip Wilson	Lindsay Clark	Billy Andrew	
Sweden	Tomas Nordin	Örjan Jonsson	Glenn Haglund	Stefan Timan	Härnösands CK
Switzerland	Markus Eggler	Marc Haudenschild	Frank Kobel	Reto Huber	
United States	Darren Kress	Brett Davis	Duane McGregor	Connor Oihus	

== Round robin ==
Place	Team	1	2	3	4	5	6	7	8	9	10	Wins	Losses
1	Canada	*	6:4	3:8	10:8	8:5	9:3	8:6	10:4	9:3	9:4	8	1
2	Scotland	4:6	*	10:2	8:6	7:6	10:5	6:5	6:5	9:4	8:3	8	1
3	Switzerland	8:3	2:10	*	8:7	7:6	4:7	8:7	11:4	17:2	13:0	7	2
4	Norway	8:10	6:8	7:8	*	6:9	7:6	7:5	11:5	11:5	11:5	5	4
4	Germany	5:8	6:7	6:7	9:6	*	6:4	5:8	6:5	8:3	10:3	5	4
6	United States	3:9	5:10	7:4	6:7	4:6	*	9:7	1:9	9:2	9:3	4	5
7	Sweden	6:8	5:6	7:8	5:7	8:5	7:9	*	10:5	10:5	9:6	4	5
8	Denmark	4:10	5:6	4:11	5:11	5:6	9:1	5:10	*	13:5	4:9	2	7
9	France	3:9	4:9	2:17	5:11	3:8	2:9	5:10	5:13	*	12:2	1	8
10	Italy	4:9	3:8	0:13	5:11	3:10	3:9	6:9	9:4	2:12	*	1	8

Teams to playoffs
Teams to tiebreaker

=== Tiebreaker ===
Team	Final
Norway	6
Germany	4

== Playoffs ==
Semifinals
1	Canada	11
4	Norway	5
2	Scotland	8
3	Switzerland	7

Gold Medal Game
1	Canada	2
2	Scotland	3
Bronze Medal Game
4	Norway	7
3	Switzerland	3

== Final standings ==
Place	Team	Games played	Wins	Losses
1st place, gold medalist(s)	Scotland	11	10	1
2nd place, silver medalist(s)	Canada	11	9	2
3rd place, bronze medalist(s)	Norway	12	7	5
4	Switzerland	11	7	4
5	Germany	10	5	5
6	United States	9	4	5
7	Sweden	9	4	5
8	Denmark	9	2	7
9	France	9	1	8
10	Italy	9	1	8

== Awards ==
- WJCC Sportsmanship Award: (Canada) Jonathan Mead

All-Star Team:

- Skip: (Scotland) Douglas Dryburgh
- Third: (Canada) Jonathan Mead
- Second: (Scotland) Lindsay Clark
- Lead: (Sweden) Stefan Timan
