= Anthon Grimsmo =

Norwegian curler and Olympic medalist

Personal information
- Born: 5 July 1968 (age 57) Oslo, Norway

Sport
- Sport: Curling
- Club: Snarøen CC
Medal record
Representing Norway
Men's Curling
Olympic Games
Bronze medal – third place	1998 Nagano	Team
World Junior Curling Championships
Bronze medal – third place	1987 Victoria	Team
European Curling Championships
Bronze medal – third place	1995 Grindelwald

Anthon Grimsmo (born 5 July 1968) is a Norwegian curler and Olympic medalist. He received a bronze medal at the 1998 Winter Olympics in Nagano.

Anthon Grimsmo was skip for the bronze-winning team at the 1987 World Junior Curling Championships in Victoria.

== Achievements ==
3rd place at the 1998 Winter Olympics

3rd place European Championship 1987

3rd place at the 1997 Junior World Championships
