= Douglas Dryburgh =

Scottish-Irish curler (born 1966)

Medal record

Men's Curling

World Junior Curling Championships
| Gold medal – first place | 1987 Victoria | |

European Curling Championships
| Bronze medal – third place | 1997 Füssen | |

Douglas Dryburgh (born 30 January 1966 in Inverness or Kirkcaldy, Scotland) is a Scottish-Irish curler, originally from Kirkcaldy. He is a former World Junior champion skip and represented Great Britain at the 1998 Winter Olympics.

== Career ==
=== Juniors ===
In 1986, in his fifth Scottish Junior Curling Championship, and his first as a skip, Dryburgh lost in the final to David Aitken, who went on to win that year's World Junior Championship. Dryburgh missed his last shot in the 10th, 11th and 12th ends of that game, gaining him a "somewhat unwarranted reputation as a 'choker'". That season, he also made it to the final of the Scottish Men's Curling Championship. losing to David Smith in the final. The next season he was finally victorious at the Scottish Junior Championship, defeating Alistair Scott in the Scottish final. He and his rink of Philip Wilson, Lindsay Clark and Billy Andrew went on to represent Scotland at the 1987 World Junior Curling Championships. There, he led his rink to an 8–1 round robin record. In the playoffs, he beat Switzerland and then defeated Canada's Hugh McFadyen rink in the final. At the time, he was an electronic engineering student at the Paisley College of Technology. The media dubbed him as the most "colourful" skip at the tournament, becoming a "fan favourite" due to his "soft-edged cockiness" and "dry sense of humour". Dryburgh was named the all-star skip at the tournament and curled 78% at the event. That same season, Dryburgh made it to the Scottish men's final once again, losing to Grant McPherson.

=== Men's ===
Following the Royal Caledonian Curling Club (Scotland's national curling body) decision to ban McPherson from competing at the 1987 European Curling Championships due to disciplinary reasons, Dryburgh and his rink were selected to represent Scotland at the Euros in their stead. His team placed sixth, with a 4–2 record at the tournament held in Oberstdorf, Germany. Ten years later at the 1997 European Curling Championships held in Füssen, Germany, he led his rink of Peter Wilson, Philip Wilson, Ronnie Napier and brother James to a 4–1 record in group play. They then won their quarter final against Norway, but lost in the semifinal to Germany, settling for the bronze medal. Two months earlier, Dryburgh won the British Olympic Trials held in Perth, at a time where rinks were not even open for the season yet in Scotland. This qualified his rink for the 1998 Winter Olympics in Nagano, Japan, where he captained the British team and placed 7th out of 8. At the time, Dryburgh was employed as a flight lieutenant for the Royal Air Force and had to negotiate a posting in Kinloss, Scotland so that he could train, declining a promotion to a posting in the Falkland Islands in the process.

Dryburgh played on the Ireland team at the 2005 European Championships in Garmisch-Partenkirchen, Germany with teammates Peter Wilson, Robin Gray, Johnjo Kenny and Peter J. D. Wilson. He led Ireland to a 4–5 record, placing 7th. This qualified Ireland for the 2006 World Men's Curling Championship in Lowell, Massachusetts, the first time Ireland ever qualified for the World Men's Curling Championship. There, the team finished in 12th place out of 12 teams, winning just one game. Dryburgh played in six of the team's 11 matches, including their lone win against Japan.

== Personal life ==
Douglas Dryburgh is son of ice hockey player Jack Dryburgh, the brother of Olympic teammate James Dryburgh and brother-in-law of Margaretha Lindahl.
