= Jon Mead =

Canadian curler

Jonathan Mead
- Curler
- Born: April 10, 1967 (age 59); Regina, Saskatchewan

Team
- Curling club: Charleswood CC, Winnipeg, MB

Curling career
- Brier: 7 (1999, 2000, 2006, 2011, 2013, 2014, 2016)
- World Championship: 2 (1999, 2011)
- Top CTRS ranking: 1st (2003–04, 2012–13)
- Grand Slam victories: 5: Masters (2004); Canadian Open (2006); The National (2008, 2013); Players (2003)
Medal record
Men's curling
Representing Canada
World Curling Championships
Gold medal – first place	2011 Regina
Silver medal – second place	1999 Saint John
World Junior Championships
Silver medal – second place	1987 Victoria
Representing Manitoba
Canadian Olympic Curling Trials
Silver medal – second place	2005 Halifax
Tim Hortons Brier
Gold medal – first place	1999 Edmonton
Gold medal – first place	2011 London
Silver medal – second place	2013 Edmonton
Bronze medal – third place	2014 Kamloops

Jonathan Mead (born April 10, 1967, in Regina, Saskatchewan) is a Canadian curler from Winnipeg, Manitoba. Mead played third for Wayne Middaugh's rink (except for provincial playdowns) until the end of the 2009–10 curling season. Beginning in the 2010–11 curling season, he again played third for Jeff Stoughton's Manitoba team.

== Career ==
Before joining Middaugh, Mead was the longtime third for Jeff Stoughton, whose team he joined prior to the 1999 season. That year, they won the Manitoba provincial championships, the Brier and a silver medal at the World Curling Championships. They would return to the 2000 Brier, and again to the 2006 Brier but would not win again.

Mead also won the 1986 Canadian Junior Curling Championships as a third for Hugh McFadyen and won silver at the 1987 World Junior Curling Championships.

In March 2007, it was announced that Mead would join Wayne Middaugh's team for the following season on the World Curling Tour. This was mainly done for a run at the 2010 Winter Olympics, as Mead would be unable to play for the team in the Brier, as he is not a resident of Ontario.

In April 2010, it was reported that Mead would once again play with Jeff Stoughton's rink. He will continue playing at third, while Reid Carruthers, also joining the Stoughton team, will play as second. The reuniting was a success, as the team would go on to win the 2011 Tim Hortons Brier and the 2011 Ford World Men's Curling Championship.

== Personal life ==
Born in Regina, Saskatchewan, Mead moved to Winnipeg at 4 years old.

Mead works as a Business Development Consultant. He is married and has two children.

Mead served as an analyst for Shaw TV's coverage of the 2009 and 2010 Safeway Championships.

== Teams ==
Season	Skip	Third	Second	Lead
1998–99	Jeff Stoughton	Jon Mead	Garry Vandenberghe	Doug Armstrong
1999–00	Jeff Stoughton	Jon Mead	Garry Vandenberghe	Doug Armstrong
2000–01	Jeff Stoughton	Jon Mead	Garry Vandenberghe	Doug Armstrong
2001–02	Jeff Stoughton	Jon Mead	Garry Vandenberghe	Doug Armstrong
2002–03	Jeff Stoughton	Jon Mead	Garry Vandenberghe	Jim Spencer
2003–04	Jeff Stoughton	Jon Mead	Garry Vandenberghe	Steve Gould
2004–05	Jeff Stoughton	Jon Mead	Garry Vandenberghe	Steve Gould
2005–06	Jeff Stoughton	Jon Mead	Garry Vandenberghe	Steve Gould
2009–10	Wayne Middaugh	Jon Mead	John Epping	Scott Bailey
2010–11	Jeff Stoughton	Jon Mead	Reid Carruthers	Steve Gould
2011–12	Jeff Stoughton	Jon Mead	Reid Carruthers	Steve Gould
2012–13	Jeff Stoughton	Jon Mead	Reid Carruthers	Mark Nichols
2013–14	Jeff Stoughton	Jon Mead	Reid Carruthers	Mark Nichols
2013–14	Jeff Stoughton	Jon Mead	Mark Nichols	Reid Carruthers
2014–15	Glenn Howard	Richard Hart	Jon Mead	Craig Savill
