= Jane Bidstrup =

Danish curler and Olympic medalist

Medal record

Representing Denmark

Women's Curling

Olympic Games
Silver medal – second place	1998 Nagano	Team

World championships
Bronze medal – third place	1997 Berne	Team

Jane Bidstrup (born 21 August 1955) is a Danish curler and Olympic medalist. She received a silver medal at the 1998 Winter Olympics in Nagano. This was the first medal, Denmark has ever won at a Winter Olympics, and the only one until 2026, when Viktor Hald Thorup won silver medals at the 2026 Olympics. She was part of the bronze-team at the 1997 World Curling Championships.
