= Anne Laird =

Scottish curler

- Curler
- Other names: Annie Laird
- Born: 20 May 1970 (age 56); Edinburgh, Scotland
Medal record
Women's curling
Representing Scotland
World Championships
Gold medal – first place	2002 Bismarck
Silver medal – second place	2010 Swift Current
European Championships
Silver medal – second place	2010 Champéry

Anne "Annie" Laird (born 20 May 1970) is a Scottish curler.

In 1991, Laird won a bronze medal at the World Junior Curling Championships playing lead for Gillian Barr.

In 2002, Laird was a member of the gold medal-winning team at the World Curling Championships, playing lead for Jackie Lockhart.

Laird replaced Karen Addison as the alternate in the British curling team for the 2010 Winter Olympic Games, after Addison was deselected.
