= Ulrika Bergman =

Swedish curler

- Curler
- Born: 11 June 1975 (age 51); Östersund, Sweden
Medal record
Women's curling
Representing Sweden
Olympic Games
Gold medal – first place	2006 Turin	Women's Curling
World Championships
Gold medal – first place	2005 Paisley	Team
Gold medal – first place	2006 Grande Prairie	Team
Silver medal – second place	2002 Bismarck	Team
European Championships
Gold medal – first place	2004 Sofia	Team
Gold medal – first place	2005 Garmisch-Partenkirchen	Team
Silver medal – second place	1999 Chamonix	Team
World Junior Championships
Silver medal – second place	1995 Perth	Team
Bronze medal – third place	1996 Red Deer	Team
Bronze medal – third place	1994 Sofia	Team

Ulrika Bergman (born 11 June 1975 in Östersund) is a Swedish curler from Solna. She is currently the alternate for the World and Olympic Champion Anette Norberg team. She was the fourth player (threw last rocks) for Margaretha Lindahl in four straight world junior championships from 1993 to 1996. Their best finish was in 1995 when they won the silver medal. In 1997, she switched throwing positions with Lindhal for their debut at the European Championships where they won a silver. Bergman has been Norberg's alternate since 2004, winning an Olympic gold medal in 2006.

== Awards ==
- World Junior Curling Championships All-star skip: 1995, 1996.
- In 2005 she was inducted into the Swedish Curling Hall of Fame.
