= 1995 World Junior Curling Championships =

- Host city: Perth, Scotland
- Dates: March 19–26, 1995
- Men's winner: Scotland
- Skip: Tom Brewster
- Third: Paul Westwood
- Second: Ronald Brewster
- Lead: Steve Still
- Alternate: David Murdoch
- Finalist: Germany (Daniel Herberg)
- Women's winner: Canada
- Skip: Kelly Mackenzie
- Third: Joanne Fillion
- Second: Sasha Bergner
- Lead: Carlene Muth
- Alternate: Cara Walz
- Finalist: Sweden (Margaretha Lindahl)

The 1995 Bank of Scotland World Junior Curling Championships were held in Perth, Scotland March 19–26.

== Men's ==
Country	Skip	Wins	Losses
Scotland	Tom Brewster	8	1
Canada	Christopher Galbraith	8	1
Germany	Daniel Herberg	7	2
Sweden	Henrik Edlund	5	4
United States	Mike Peplinski	4	5
Japan	Hiroshi Sato	4	5
Switzerland	Ralph Stöckli	3	6
Denmark	Johnny Frederiksen	3	6
Finland	Perttu Piilo	2	7
France	Cyrille Prunet	1	8

=== Playoffs ===
Semi-final
1	Scotland	8
4	Sweden	3
2	Canada	7
3	Germany	8

Final
1	Scotland	6
3	Germany	3
Bronze medal
2	Canada	9
4	Sweden	2

== Women's ==
Country	Skip	Wins	Losses
Sweden	Margaretha Lindahl	9	0
Scotland	Julia Ewart	8	1
Canada	Kelly Mackenzie	7	2
Switzerland	Nadja Heuer	5	4
Germany	Gerrit Müller	5	4
United States	Risa O'Connell	3	6
Japan	Mika Hori	3	6
Norway	Marianne Haslum	2	7
Denmark	Kamilla Schack	2	7
Czech Republic	Jana Linhartova	1	8

== Tiebreaker ==
- Switzerland 7-5 Germany

=== Playoffs ===
Semi-final
1	Sweden	7
4	Switzerland	4
2	Scotland	6
3	Canada	8

Final
1	Sweden	5
3	Canada	6
Bronze medal
2	Scotland	3
4	Switzerland	8

== Sources ==
- Men's results from the World Curling Federation
- Women's results from the World Curling Federation
