= 2005 The National =

Grand Slam of Curling event

The National 2005
- Host city: Port Hawkesbury, Nova Scotia
- Arena: Port Hawkesbury Civic Centre
- Dates: November 2–6, 2005
- Winner: (Ontario) Team Middaugh
- Skip: Wayne Middaugh
- Third: Peter Corner
- Second: Phil Loevenmark
- Lead: Scott Bailey
- Finalist: (Saskatchewan) Pat Simmons

2005 The National was held November 2–6, 2005, at the Port Hawkesbury Civic Centre in Port Hawkesbury, Nova Scotia. The total purse of the event was $100,000. It was the first (men's) Grand Slam event of the 2005-06 curling season.

Ontario's Wayne Middaugh rink defeated Saskatchewan's Pat Simmons team. It was Middaugh's third outright victory in four tournaments up to that point in the season. Middaugh's win gave him a career Grand Slam, and his team took home $28,000 for the win. Team Simmons took home $16,000, with semifinalists Randy Ferbey of Edmonton and Ontario's Glenn Howard winning $12,000 each.

The semifinals and finals were broadcast on Sportsnet.

== Teams ==
The teams were as follows:

Skip	Third	Second	Lead	Locale
Shawn Adams	Paul Flemming	Craig Burgess	Kelly Mittelstadt	Halifax, Nova Scotia
Tom Brewster	Graeme Connal	?	Neil Murdoch	Scotland
Pete Fenson	Shawn Rojeski	Joe Polo	John Shuster	(United States) Bemidji, Minnesota
David Nedohin	Randy Ferbey (skip)	Scott Pfeifer	Marcel Rocque	Edmonton, Alberta
Brad Gushue	Mark Nichols	Russ Howard (skip)	Jamie Korab	St. John's, Newfoundland and Labrador
Glenn Howard	Richard Hart	Brent Laing	Craig Savill	Coldwater, Ontario
Peja Lindholm	Tomas Nordin	Magnus Swartling	Peter Narup	Sweden
Kevin Martin	Don Walchuk	Carter Rycroft	Don Bartlett	Edmonton, Alberta
Wayne Middaugh	Peter Corner	Phil Loevenmark	Scott Bailey	(Ontario) Toronto
John Morris	Kevin Koe	Marc Kennedy	Paul Moffatt	(Alberta) Calgary
David Murdoch	Craig Wilson (?)	Ewan MacDonald	Euan Byers (?)	Scotland
Andreas Schwaller	Jan Hauser	Markus Eggler	Simon Strübin	Baden, Switzerland
Pat Simmons	Jeff Sharp	Ben Hebert	Steve Laycock	Saskatoon, Saskatchewan
Ralph Stöckli	Claudio Pescia	Pascal Sieber	Marco Battilana	Switzerland
Jeff Stoughton	Jon Mead	Garry Vandenberghe	Steve Gould	(Manitoba) Winnipeg
Pal Trulsen	Lars Vagberg	Flemming Davanger	Bent Anund Ramsfjell	Norway
Markku Uusipaavalniemi	Wille Makela	Kalle Kiiskinen	Teemu Salo	Finland

== Draw ==
The event was a triple knock out.

== Playoffs ==
The scores for the playoffs were as follows.

Quarter-Finals
(Alberta) Ferbey	9
(Newfoundland and Labrador) Team Gushue	5
(Saskatchewan) Simmons	8
(Alberta) Martin	3
(Ontario) Howard	12
(Norway) Trulsen	9
(Ontario) Middaugh	8
(Manitoba) Stoughton	4

Semi-Finals
(Alberta) Ferbey	7
(Saskatchewan) Simmons	9
(Ontario) Howard	6
(Ontario) Middaugh	9

Final
(Saskatchewan) Simmons	6
(Ontario) Middaugh	8
