= Swiss Cup Basel =

Annual curling competition in Switzerland

- Established: 2003
- Host city: Arlesheim, Switzerland
- Arena: Curlingzentrum Region Basel
- Purse: CHF 25,000
- 2026 champion: (Czech Republic) Lukáš Klíma

The Swiss Cup Basel (formerly the Swiss Cup) is an annual curling tournament held in early November in Arlesheim, Switzerland. It was part of the World Curling Tour until 2020.

== Past champions ==
Year	Winning team	Runner-up team	Purse (CHF)
2003	(Switzerland) Ralph Stöckli, Claudio Pescia, Pascal Sieber, Simon Strübin	(Canada) Randy Ferbey, Brent MacDonald, Brent Laing, Marcel Rocque	23,930
2004	(Switzerland) Andreas Schwaller, Christof Schwaller, Marco Ramstein, Roland Moser	(Sweden) Peja Lindholm, Tomas Nordin, Magnus Swartling, Peter Narup	31,840
2005	(Canada) Kerry Burtnyk (Fourth), Randy Ferbey (Skip), Scott Pfeifer, Marcel Rocque	(Norway) Thomas Løvold, Petter Moe, Christoffer Svae, Håvard Vad Petersson	40,000
2006	(Canada) Brad Gushue, Mark Nichols, Chris Schille, Jamie Korab	(Germany) Andy Kapp, Uli Kapp, Andreas Lang, Oliver Axnick	40,000
2007	(Scotland) David Murdoch, Ewan MacDonald, Peter Smith, Euan Byers	(Switzerland) Stefan Karnusian, Christof Schwaller, Robert Hürlimann, Rolf Iseli	40,000
2008	(Canada) Brad Gushue, Mark Nichols, Ryan Fry, Jamie Korab	(Switzerland) Ralph Stöckli, Jan Hauser, Markus Eggler, Simon Strübin	40,000
2009	(Norway) Thomas Ulsrud, Torger Nergård, Christoffer Svae, Håvard Vad Petersson	(Sweden) Niklas Edin, Sebastian Kraupp, Fredrik Lindberg, Viktor Kjäll	40,000
2010	(Germany) Andy Kapp, Daniel Herberg, Andy Lang, Markus Messenzehl	(Switzerland) Christof Schwaller, Robert Hürlimann, Urs Eichhorn, Marco Ramstein	45,900
2011	(Canada) Brad Gushue, Ryan Fry, Geoff Walker, Adam Casey	(Switzerland) Benoît Schwarz (Fourth), Peter de Cruz (Skip), Gilles Vuille, Valentin Tanner	40,000
2012	(Sweden) Kristian Lindström (Fourth), Oskar Eriksson (Skip), Markus Eriksson, Christoffer Sundgren	(Switzerland) Sven Michel, Claudio Pätz, Sandro Trolliet, Simon Gempeler	40,000
2013	(Norway) Thomas Ulsrud, Torger Nergård, Christoffer Svae, Håvard Vad Petersson	(Sweden) Oskar Eriksson, Kristian Lindström, Markus Eriksson, Christoffer Sundgren	43,200
2014	(Scotland) Tom Brewster, Glen Muirhead, Ross Paterson, Hammy McMillan Jr.	(Switzerland) Sven Michel, Florian Meister, Simon Gempeler, Stefan Meienberg	42,200
2015	(Canada) Brad Gushue, Mark Nichols, Brett Gallant, Geoff Walker	(Netherlands) Jaap van Dorp, Wouter Gosgens, Laurens Hoekman, Carlo Glasbergen	42,200
2016	(Sweden) Niklas Edin, Oskar Eriksson, Rasmus Wranå, Christoffer Sundgren	(Scotland) David Murdoch, Greg Drummond, Scott Andrews, Michael Goodfellow	40,000
2017	(Canada) Brad Gushue, Mark Nichols, Brett Gallant, Geoff Walker	(Norway) Thomas Ulsrud, Torger Nergård, Christoffer Svae, Håvard Vad Petersson	40,000
2018	(Sweden) Niklas Edin, Oskar Eriksson, Rasmus Wranå, Christoffer Sundgren	(Norway) Steffen Walstad, Markus Hoiberg, Magnus Nedregotten, Magnus Vågberg	40,000
2019	(Switzerland) Benoît Schwarz (Fourth), Sven Michel, Peter de Cruz (Skip), Valentin Tanner	(Scotland) Ross Paterson, Kyle Waddell, Duncan Menzies, Michael Goodfellow	38,000
2020	Cancelled		
2021	(Switzerland) Benoît Schwarz (Fourth), Sven Michel, Peter de Cruz (Skip), Valentin Tanner	(Sweden) Niklas Edin, Oskar Eriksson, Rasmus Wranå, Christoffer Sundgren	24,000
2022	(Scotland) Ross Whyte, Robin Brydone, Duncan McFadzean, Euan Kyle	(Norway) Magnus Ramsfjell, Martin Sesaker, Bendik Ramsfjell, Gaute Nepstad	24,000
2023	(Scotland) Cameron Bryce, Duncan Menzies, Luke Carson, Robin McCall	(Switzerland) Yves Stocker, Kim Schwaller, Felix Eberhard, Tom Winkelhausen	24,000
2024	(Czech Republic) Lukáš Klíma, Marek Černovský, Martin Jurík, Lukáš Klípa, Radek Boháč	(Scotland) Kyle Waddell, Craig Waddell, Mark Taylor, Gavin Barr	24,000
2025	(Scotland) Cameron Bryce, Duncan Menzies, Scott Hyslop, Robin McCall	(Switzerland) Yves Stocker, Kim Schwaller, Marco Hefti, Felix Eberhard	25,000
2026	(Czech Republic) Lukáš Klíma, Vít Chabičovský, Martin Jurík, Lukáš Klípa	(Italy) Stefano Spiller, Amos Mosaner, Sebastiano Arman, Cesare Spiller	25,000
