= Grand Prix Bern Inter =

World Curling Tour event

- Established: 1997
- Host city: Bern, Switzerland
- Arena: Curlingbahn Allmend Bern
- Purse: CHF 16,500
- 2026 champion: (Italy) Stefano Spiller

The Grand Prix Bern Inter, also known as the Grand Prix Bern Inter Curling Challenge, is an annual tournament on the men's World Curling Tour. It is held annually on the last weekend of October or the first weekend of November at the Curlingbahn Allmend Bern in Bern, Switzerland.

The purse for the event is CHF 16,500, with the winning team receiving CHF 5,000.

The event has been held since 1997, and has been part of the World Curling Tour since 2018.

Although it's a men's event, Andrea Schöpp won the event in 2010.

== Champions ==
The champions for this event are as follows:

Year	Winning team
1997	(Switzerland) Stefan Karnusian, Richard Baumer, Kurt Reichenbach, Martin Stähli
1998	(Switzerland) Bernhard Werthemann, Raphael Brütsch, Thomas Lips, Philipp Raspe
1999	(Switzerland) Patrick Hürlimann, Dominic Andres, Martin Romang, Diego Perren
2000	(Denmark) Johnny Frederiksen, Henrik Jakobsen, Lars Vilandt, Bo Jensen
2001	(Germany) Sebastian Stock, Stephan Knoll, Markus Messenzehl, Patrick Hoffman
2002	(Switzerland) Werner Attinger, Stephan Rüdisühli, Markus Foitek, Maurus Müller
2003	(Switzerland) Andreas Östreich, Markus Eggler (skip), Damian Grichting, Rouven Welschen
2004	(Switzerland) Ralph Stöckli, Claudio Pescia, Pascal Sieber, Simon Strübin, Marco Battilana
2005	(Italy) Joel Retornaz, Fabio Alverà, Gianpaolo Zandegiacomo, Alessandro Zisa, Antonio Menardi
2006	(Germany) Sebastian Stock, Daniel Herberg, Markus Messenzehl, Patrick Hoffman
2007	(Switzerland) Stefan Karnusian, Christof Schwaller, Robert Hürlimann, Rolf Iseli
2008	(Switzerland) Pascal Hess, Yves Hess, Florian Zürrer, Felix Attinger
2009	(Switzerland) David Bärtschiger, Marc Pfister, Roger Meier, Enrico Pfister, Marianne Zürcher
2010	(Germany) Andrea Schöpp, Imogen Oona Lehmann, Corinna Scholz, Stella Heiss
2011	(Switzerland) Sven Michel, Claudio Pätz, Sandro Trolliet, Simon Gempeler
2012	(Switzerland) Manuel Ruch, Jean-Nicolas Longchamp, Daniel Graf, Mathias Graf
2013	(Switzerland) Jean-Nicolas Longchamp, Manuel Ruch, Renato Hächler, Mathias Graf, Christian Moser
2014	(Switzerland) Marc Pfister, Enrico Pfister, Roger Meier, Raphael Märki, Michael Bösiger
2015	(Switzerland) Christian Haller, Yves Hess (skip), Rainer Kobler, Fabian Schmid
2016	(Switzerland) Kevin Wunderlin, Reto Gribi, Mike Wenger, Mats Perret
2017	(Switzerland) Martin Rios, Christof Schwaller (skip), Kevin Spychiger, Peju Hartmann, Henä Hügli

Year	Winning team	Runner up team	Purse (CHF)	Winner's share (CHF)
2018	(Italy) Amos Mosaner, Sebastiano Arman, Daniele Ferrazza, Andrea Pilzer	(Scotland) Robin Brydone, Craig Waddell, Gregor Cannon, Derrick Sloan, Fraser Davidson	18,100	5,000
2019	(Italy) Joel Retornaz, Amos Mosaner, Sebastiano Arman, Simone Gonin	(Scotland) Ross Whyte, Robin Brydone, Duncan McFadzean, Euan Kyle	18,100	5,000
2020	Not held			
2021	(Switzerland) Philipp Hösli (Fourth), Yves Stocker (Skip), Marco Hefti, Justin Hausherr	(Germany) Sixten Totzek, Marc Muskatewitz, Joshua Sutor, Dominik Greindl	18,100	5,000
2022	(Italy) Joel Retornaz, Amos Mosaner, Sebastiano Arman, Mattia Giovanella	(Netherlands) Wouter Gosgens, Jaap van Dorp, Laurens Hoekman, Tobias van den Hurk, Alexander Magan	18,100	5,500
2023	(Scotland) James Craik, Mark Watt, Angus Bryce, Blair Haswell	(Germany) Marc Muskatewitz (Fourth), Benny Kapp (Skip), Felix Messenzehl, Johannes Scheuerl	18,100	5,500
2024	(Switzerland) Philipp Hösli (Fourth), Marco Hösli (Skip), Simon Gloor, Justin Hausherr	(Switzerland) Marco Hefti (Fourth), Jan Iseli (Skip), Max Winz, Sandro Fanchini	18,100	5,500
2025	(Netherlands) Wouter Gösgens, Laurens Hoekman, Jaap van Dorp, Tobias van den Hurk	(Switzerland) Michael Brunner, Anthony Petoud, Romano Keller-Meier, Andreas Gerlach	18,100	5,500
2026	(Italy) Stefano Spiller, Amos Mosaner, Sebastiano Arman, Cesare Spiller	(Italy) Mattia Giovanella (Fourth), Alberto Zisa (Skip), Francesco De Zanna, Francesco Vigliani	16,500	5,000
