= 2006 World Men's Curling Championship =

- Host city: Lowell, Massachusetts, United States
- Arena: Tsongas Center at UMass Lowell
- Dates: April 1–9, 2006
- Winner: Scotland
- Skip: David Murdoch
- Third: Ewan MacDonald
- Second: Warwick Smith
- Lead: Euan Byers
- Alternate: Peter Smith
- Coach: Tom Pendreigh
- Finalist: Canada (Jean-Michel Ménard)

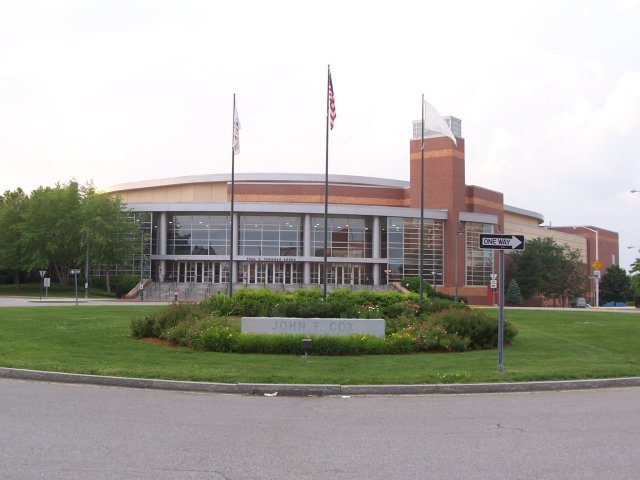
The Tsongas Center at UMass Lowell was the location of the Championship

The 2006 World Men's Curling Championship was held April 1–9, 2006 at the Tsongas Center at UMass Lowell in Lowell, Massachusetts, United States. Scotland, skipped by David Murdoch, won the tournament defeating Canada in the final.

== Teams ==
Australia	Canada	Denmark
Australia Curling Club Skip: Hugh Millikin; Third: Ricky Tasker; Second: Mike Woloschuk; Lead: Stephen Johns; Alternate: Ian Palangio	CC Victoria, Sainte-Foy and CC Etchemin, Saint-Romuald Skip: Jean-Michel Ménard; Third: François Roberge; Second: Éric Sylvain; Lead: Maxime Elmaleh; Alternate: Jean Gagnon	Hvidovre CC, Hvidovre Skip: Ulrik Schmidt; Third: Lasse Lavrsen; Second: Carsten Svensgaard; Lead: Joel Ostrowski; Alternate: Kenneth Jørgensen
Finland	Germany	Ireland
Oulunkylä Curling, Helsinki Fourth: Kalle Kiiskinen; Skip: Markku Uusipaavalniemi***; Second: Jani Sullanmaa; Lead: Teemu Salo; Alternate: Jari Rouvinen	EC Oberstdorf, Oberstdorf Skip: Sebastian Stock; Third: Daniel Herberg; Second: Markus Messenzehl; Lead: Patrick Hoffman; Alternate: Bernhard Mayr	ICA National Team Skip: Douglas Dryburgh; Third: Peter Wilson; Second: Robin Gray; Lead: John Kenny; Alternate: Peter J.D. Wilson
Japan	Norway	Scotland
Tokoro CC, Tokoro Skip: Yoshiyuki Ohmiya; Third: Makoto Tsuruga; Second: Tsuyoshi Ryutaki; Lead: Kazuhiko Ikawa; Alternate: Yuji Hirama	Snarøen CC, Bærum Skip: Thomas Ulsrud; Third: Torger Nergård; Second: Thomas Due; Lead: Jan Thoresen; Alternate: Christoffer Svae	Lockerbie CC, Lockerbie Skip: David Murdoch; Third: Ewan MacDonald; Second: Warwick Smith; Lead: Euan Byers; Alternate: Peter Smith
Sweden	Switzerland	United States
Sundbybergs CK, Sundbyberg Skip: Nils Carlsén; Third: Niklas Edin; Second: Marcus Hasselborg; Lead: Emanuel Allberg; Alternate: Daniel Tenn	CC St. Galler Bär, St. Gallen Skip: Ralph Stöckli; Third: Claudio Pescia; Second: Pascal Sieber; Lead: Simon Strübin; Alternate: Marco Battilana	Bemidji CC, Bemidji Skip: Pete Fenson; Third: Shawn Rojeski; Second: Joseph Polo; Lead: John Shuster; Alternate: Scott Baird

*** Finnish skip Markku Uusipaavalniemi missed the first three games with a wrist injury; Kiiskinen skipped in his place. Markku returned April 3; threw second rocks in the early draw and third stones in the remainder of the competition.

== Round-robin standings ==
Scoring for the tournament was done by CurlingZone.com. They calculated the player percentages differently than normal. They used a five-point system with a multiplier for degree of difficulty in shots.

Country	Skip	W	L	PF	PA	Ends Won	Ends Lost	Blank Ends	Stolen Ends	Shot Pct.
Scotland	David Murdoch	9	2	82	54	55	40	10	23	86%
Canada	Jean-Michel Ménard	8	3	77	63	52	44	13	13	83%
Norway	Thomas Ulsrud	7	4	75	61	48	44	16	13	79%
United States	Pete Fenson	7	4	67	55	43	40	23	13	82%
Sweden	Nils Carlsén	6	5	80	63	43	46	15	9	83%
Switzerland	Ralph Stöckli	6	5	68	59	47	39	15	18	81%
Finland	Markku Uusipaavalniemi	6	5	71	66	41	39	14	10	78%
Denmark	Ulrik Schmidt	5	6	68	70	42	46	13	9	79%
Australia	Hugh Millikin	5	6	66	74	47	45	18	12	77%
Germany	Sebastian Stock	4	7	41	62	33	38	18	8	72%
Japan	Yoshiyuki Ohmiya	2	9	40	64	33	46	14	3	72%
Ireland	Douglas Dryburgh	1	10	47	84	38	54	15	6	76%

== Round-robin results ==
=== Draw 1 ===
April 1, 09:00

Sheet A	1	2	3	4	5	6	7	8	9	10	11	Final
Australia (Millikin)	0	0	2	0	0	1	0	2	0	3	0	8
Scotland (Murdoch)	2	0	0	0	2	0	2	0	2	0	1	9

Sheet B	1	2	3	4	5	6	7	8	9	10	Final
Germany (Stock)	1	0	1	0	0	0	1	0	1	1	5
Norway (Ulsrud)	0	1	0	2	1	0	0	2	0	0	6

Sheet C	1	2	3	4	5	6	7	8	9	10	Final
Finland (Uusipaavalniemi)	1	0	0	1	0	0	1	0	X	X	3
Switzerland (Stöckli)	0	1	0	0	3	3	0	3	X	X	10

Sheet D	1	2	3	4	5	6	7	8	9	10	Final
Sweden (Carlsén)	0	0	0	1	0	1	0	0	0	2	4
Canada (Ménard)	0	0	1	0	1	0	1	1	1	0	5

=== Draw 2 ===
April 1, 16:00

Sheet A	1	2	3	4	5	6	7	8	9	10	Final
Switzerland (Stöckli)	0	3	0	2	0	1	1	0	0	2	9
Germany (Stock)	1	0	2	0	1	0	0	0	0	0	4

Sheet B	1	2	3	4	5	6	7	8	9	10	Final
Denmark (Schmidt)	1	0	0	1	0	2	0	1	0	1	6
Japan (Ohmiya)	0	1	3	0	1	0	2	0	1	0	8

Sheet C	1	2	3	4	5	6	7	8	9	10	11	Final
United States (Fenson)	0	0	0	1	0	1	0	0	3	0	1	6
Ireland (Dryburgh)	0	0	1	0	1	0	1	1	0	1	0	5

Sheet D	1	2	3	4	5	6	7	8	9	10	Final
Finland (Uusipaavalniemi)	2	0	0	3	0	1	0	1	0	1	8
Norway (Ulsrud)	0	3	1	0	0	0	1	0	2	0	7

=== Draw 3 ===
April 2, 09:00

Sheet A	1	2	3	4	5	6	7	8	9	10	11	Final
Canada (Ménard)	0	2	0	2	0	1	0	1	0	2	0	8
Australia (Millikin)	1	0	1	0	1	0	3	0	2	0	1	9

Sheet B	1	2	3	4	5	6	7	8	9	10	Final
Sweden (Carlsén)	2	0	0	0	2	0	1	0	2	0	7
Scotland (Murdoch)	0	2	2	0	0	2	0	3	0	0	9

=== Draw 4 ===
April 2, 14:00

Sheet A	1	2	3	4	5	6	7	8	9	10	Final
Japan (Ohmiya)	1	0	1	0	1	0	1	0	X	X	4
United States (Fenson)	0	2	0	3	0	3	0	1	X	X	9

Sheet B	1	2	3	4	5	6	7	8	9	10	11	Final
Norway (Ulsrud)	0	1	0	1	2	0	0	1	1	0	0	6
Switzerland (Stöckli)	1	0	2	0	0	0	2	0	0	1	1	7

Sheet C	1	2	3	4	5	6	7	8	9	10	Final
Germany (Stock)	0	2	0	1	1	0	2	1	0	0	7
Finland (Uusipaavalniemi)	0	0	1	0	0	2	0	0	1	0	4

Sheet D	1	2	3	4	5	6	7	8	9	10	Final
Denmark (Schmidt)	2	0	3	0	0	1	1	0	1	X	8
Ireland (Dryburgh)	0	2	0	1	0	0	0	1	0	X	4

=== Draw 5 ===
April 2, 19:00

Sheet A	1	2	3	4	5	6	7	8	9	10	Final
Scotland (Murdoch)	0	1	0	0	1	1	2	1	0	1	7
Canada (Ménard)	1	0	2	1	0	0	0	0	1	0	5

Sheet B	1	2	3	4	5	6	7	8	9	10	Final
United States (Fenson)	0	1	0	0	1	0	0	3	1	2	8
Denmark (Schmidt)	0	0	2	0	0	3	0	0	0	0	5

Sheet C	1	2	3	4	5	6	7	8	9	10	Final
Ireland (Dryburgh)	2	0	2	4	0	1	0	0	X	X	9
Japan (Ohmiya)	0	1	0	0	1	0	1	1	X	X	4

Sheet D	1	2	3	4	5	6	7	8	9	10	Final
Australia (Millikin)	0	1	0	1	1	0	1	0	X	X	4
Sweden (Carlsén)	3	0	4	0	0	2	0	1	X	X	10

=== Draw 6 ===
April 3, 09:00

Sheet A	1	2	3	4	5	6	7	8	9	10	Final
Sweden (Carlsén)	0	0	1	1	0	0	0	1	1	0	4
Finland (Uusipaavalniemi)	1	1	0	0	1	0	2	0	0	1	6

Sheet B	1	2	3	4	5	6	7	8	9	10	Final
Canada (Ménard)	1	0	0	2	0	2	1	2	X	X	8
Germany (Stock)	0	0	2	0	1	0	0	0	X	X	3

Sheet C	1	2	3	4	5	6	7	8	9	10	11	Final
Australia (Millikin)	1	0	0	2	0	0	0	0	2	1	1	7
Switzerland (Stöckli)	0	1	1	0	2	0	0	2	0	0	0	6

Sheet D	1	2	3	4	5	6	7	8	9	10	Final
Scotland (Murdoch)	0	3	0	2	0	1	0	0	2	0	8
Norway (Ulsrud)	1	0	2	0	1	0	1	3	0	1	9

=== Draw 7 ===
April 3, 14:00

Sheet A	1	2	3	4	5	6	7	8	9	10	Final
Germany (Stock)	0	0	1	1	1	0	1	2	0	0	6
Ireland (Dryburgh)	0	1	0	0	0	0	0	0	0	0	1

Sheet B	1	2	3	4	5	6	7	8	9	10	Final
Finland (Uusipaavalniemi)	0	0	0	1	0	1	0	1	0	0	3
Japan (Ohmiya)	0	1	0	0	3	0	1	0	1	0	6

Sheet C	1	2	3	4	5	6	7	8	9	10	Final
Norway (Ulsrud)	0	0	0	0	1	0	3	0	2	2	8
United States (Fenson)	0	0	1	2	0	1	0	1	0	0	5

Sheet D	1	2	3	4	5	6	7	8	9	10	Final
Switzerland (Stöckli)	1	0	1	0	1	0	X	X	X	X	3
Denmark (Schmidt)	0	2	0	2	0	5	X	X	X	X	9

=== Draw 8 ===
April 3, 19:00

Sheet A	1	2	3	4	5	6	7	8	9	10	Final
Denmark (Schmidt)	0	1	0	0	0	2	1	0	2	2	8
Australia (Millikin)	1	0	0	0	1	0	0	1	0	0	3

Sheet B	1	2	3	4	5	6	7	8	9	10	Final
United States (Fenson)	0	0	0	1	0	2	1	0	1	1	6
Scotland (Murdoch)	1	0	1	0	1	0	0	1	0	0	4

Sheet C	1	2	3	4	5	6	7	8	9	10	Final
Japan (Ohmiya)	0	0	0	0	2	0	1	0	0	0	3
Sweden (Carlsén)	0	0	1	1	0	2	0	0	0	1	5

Sheet D	1	2	3	4	5	6	7	8	9	10	Final
Ireland (Dryburgh)	0	1	0	0	1	0	2	0	1	2	7
Canada (Ménard)	2	0	1	1	0	2	0	2	0	0	8

=== Draw 9 ===
April 4, 09:00

Sheet A	1	2	3	4	5	6	7	8	9	10	Final
Japan (Ohmiya)	0	0	1	0	1	1	0	0	0	X	3
Scotland (Murdoch)	1	1	0	2	0	0	1	2	1	X	8

Sheet B	1	2	3	4	5	6	7	8	9	10	Final
Ireland (Dryburgh)	1	0	0	2	0	0	1	0	X	X	4
Australia (Millikin)	0	2	1	0	3	1	0	3	X	X	10

Sheet C	1	2	3	4	5	6	7	8	9	10	11	Final
Denmark (Schmidt)	0	0	1	0	1	0	3	0	1	0	0	6
Canada (Ménard)	0	1	0	1	0	3	0	0	0	1	1	7

Sheet D	1	2	3	4	5	6	7	8	9	10	Final
United States (Fenson)	1	1	1	0	1	0	0	3	0	X	7
Sweden (Carlsén)	0	0	0	1	0	0	2	0	1	X	4

=== Draw 10 ===
April 4, 14:00

Sheet A	1	2	3	4	5	6	7	8	9	10	Final
Canada (Ménard)	0	2	0	1	0	1	0	0	0	1	5
Norway (Ulsrud)	1	0	1	0	0	0	2	0	0	0	4

Sheet B	1	2	3	4	5	6	7	8	9	10	Final
Sweden (Carlsén)	0	0	2	0	2	0	2	3	0	0	9
Switzerland (Stöckli)	2	1	0	2	0	1	0	0	1	1	8

Sheet C	1	2	3	4	5	6	7	8	9	10	Final
Scotland (Murdoch)	1	1	1	2	3	0	X	X	X	X	8
Germany (Stock)	0	0	0	0	0	1	X	X	X	X	1

Sheet D	1	2	3	4	5	6	7	8	9	10	Final
Australia (Millikin)	0	0	2	0	0	0	2	0	1	0	5
Finland (Uusipaavalniemi)	0	1	0	3	2	1	0	1	0	1	9

=== Draw 11 ===
April 4, 19:00

Sheet A	1	2	3	4	5	6	7	8	9	10	Final
Switzerland (Stöckli)	0	0	1	0	0	0	0	1	1	0	3
United States (Fenson)	0	0	0	0	1	0	1	0	0	2	4

Sheet B	1	2	3	4	5	6	7	8	9	10	Final
Norway (Ulsrud)	2	0	0	0	0	2	0	2	0	1	7
Denmark (Schmidt)	0	1	1	1	0	0	2	0	0	0	5

Sheet C	1	2	3	4	5	6	7	8	9	10	Final
Finland (Uusipaavalniemi)	0	0	0	3	0	1	0	2	3	X	9
Ireland (Dryburgh)	1	0	0	0	3	0	1	0	0	X	5

Sheet D	1	2	3	4	5	6	7	8	9	10	Final
Germany (Stock)	2	0	2	0	2	0	0	0	0	3	9
Japan (Ohmiya)	0	2	0	2	0	1	2	1	0	0	8

=== Draw 12 ===
April 5, 09:00

Sheet A	1	2	3	4	5	6	7	8	9	10	Final
Finland (Uusipaavalniemi)	3	2	0	4	0	3	X	X	X	X	12
Denmark (Schmidt)	0	0	1	0	2	0	X	X	X	X	3

Sheet B	1	2	3	4	5	6	7	8	9	10	Final
Germany (Stock)	0	0	1	0	0	0	0	0	X	X	1
United States (Fenson)	2	0	0	4	0	0	0	1	X	X	7

Sheet C	1	2	3	4	5	6	7	8	9	10	Final
Switzerland (Stöckli)	1	0	3	0	0	3	1	2	X	X	10
Japan (Ohmiya)	0	1	0	1	0	0	0	0	X	X	2

Sheet D	1	2	3	4	5	6	7	8	9	10	Final
Norway (Ulsrud)	0	2	0	3	0	1	4	X	X	X	10
Ireland (Dryburgh)	0	0	1	0	0	0	0	X	X	X	1

=== Draw 13 ===
April 5, 14:00

Sheet A	1	2	3	4	5	6	7	8	9	10	Final
Ireland (Dryburgh)	0	1	0	0	0	2	0	0	0	X	3
Sweden (Carlsén)	3	0	0	2	1	0	0	1	1	X	8

Sheet B	1	2	3	4	5	6	7	8	9	10	Final
Japan (Ohmiya)	0	0	1	0	0	1	0	0	2	X	4
Canada (Ménard)	2	1	0	0	2	0	1	1	0	X	7

Sheet C	1	2	3	4	5	6	7	8	9	10	Final
United States (Fenson)	0	0	0	0	0	2	1	1	0	0	4
Australia (Millikin)	0	0	1	1	0	0	0	0	2	1	5

Sheet D	1	2	3	4	5	6	7	8	9	10	Final
Denmark (Schmidt)	0	1	0	0	0	1	0	0	1	X	3
Scotland (Murdoch)	2	0	1	1	1	0	1	1	0	X	7

=== Draw 14 ===
April 5, 19:00

Sheet A	1	2	3	4	5	6	7	8	9	10	Final
Australia (Millikin)	1	0	0	0	1	0	0	1	1	0	4
Germany (Stock)	0	2	0	0	0	0	2	0	0	1	5

Sheet B	1	2	3	4	5	6	7	8	9	10	Final
Scotland (Murdoch)	0	2	0	1	0	1	0	2	0	3	9
Finland (Uusipaavalniemi)	1	0	2	0	0	0	2	0	1	0	6

Sheet C	1	2	3	4	5	6	7	8	9	10	Final
Sweden (Carlsén)	3	0	2	1	0	0	1	0	0	1	8
Norway (Ulsrud)	0	1	0	0	1	1	0	1	1	0	5

Sheet D	1	2	3	4	5	6	7	8	9	10	Final
Canada (Ménard)	0	3	0	2	0	0	1	0	3	0	9
Switzerland (Stöckli)	3	0	1	0	1	2	0	2	0	1	10

=== Draw 15 ===
April 6, 09:00

Sheet A	1	2	3	4	5	6	7	8	9	10	Final
Norway (Ulsrud)	0	1	0	0	1	4	0	1	0	1	8
Japan (Ohmiya)	0	0	0	2	0	0	1	0	2	0	5

Sheet B	1	2	3	4	5	6	7	8	9	10	Final
Switzerland (Stöckli)	1	0	2	1	3	0	1	X	X	X	8
Ireland (Dryburgh)	0	2	0	0	0	0	0	X	X	X	2

Sheet C	1	2	3	4	5	6	7	8	9	10	Final
Germany (Stock)	0	2	0	1	0	1	0	0	1	1	6
Denmark (Schmidt)	1	0	1	0	2	0	3	0	0	0	7

Sheet D	1	2	3	4	5	6	7	8	9	10	Final
Finland (Uusipaavalniemi)	0	1	0	0	2	1	0	2	0	1	7
United States (Fenson)	0	0	1	1	0	0	2	0	1	0	5

=== Draw 16 ===
April 6, 14:00

Sheet A	1	2	3	4	5	6	7	8	9	10	Final
Scotland (Murdoch)	1	1	1	0	0	0	1	1	0	1	6
Switzerland (Stöckli)	0	0	0	0	0	2	0	0	0	0	2

Sheet B	1	2	3	4	5	6	7	8	9	10	Final
Australia (Millikin)	0	1	1	0	1	0	0	1	0	0	4
Norway (Ulsrud)	1	0	0	1	0	0	1	0	0	2	5

Sheet C	1	2	3	4	5	6	7	8	9	10	Final
Canada (Ménard)	1	0	2	0	0	1	0	1	0	1	6
Finland (Uusipaavalniemi)	0	1	0	1	0	0	0	0	2	0	4

Sheet D	1	2	3	4	5	6	7	8	9	10	Final
Sweden (Carlsén)	0	2	3	0	1	0	0	2	X	X	8
Germany (Stock)	1	0	0	1	0	0	1	0	X	X	3

=== Draw 17 ===
April 7, 19:00

Sheet A	1	2	3	4	5	6	7	8	9	10	Final
United States (Fenson)	1	0	3	0	0	2	0	0	0	0	6
Canada (Ménard)	0	3	0	2	1	0	0	2	0	1	9

Sheet B	1	2	3	4	5	6	7	8	9	10	Final
Denmark (Schmidt)	1	0	0	1	0	2	0	3	1	0	8
Sweden (Carlsén)	0	0	1	0	2	0	0	0	0	2	5

Sheet C	1	2	3	4	5	6	7	8	9	10	Final
Ireland (Dryburgh)	1	0	0	1	0	2	0	0	1	1	6
Scotland (Murdoch)	0	3	0	0	2	0	1	1	0	0	7

Sheet D	1	2	3	4	5	6	7	8	9	10	11	Final
Japan (Ohmiya)	0	0	0	2	0	2	0	0	0	2	0	6
Australia (Millikin)	0	0	0	0	2	0	2	1	1	0	1	7

== Playoffs ==
=== Brackets ===
Page playoffs
1	Scotland	2
2	Canada	8
3	Norway	8
4	United States	5

Semifinal
1	Scotland	6
3	Norway	4

Final
2	Canada	4
1	Scotland	7

=== 1 vs. 2 game ===
April 7, 14:00

Sheet C	1	2	3	4	5	6	7	8	9	10	Final
Scotland (Murdoch)	0	0	0	1	0	1	X	X	X	X	2
Canada (Ménard)	1	3	1	0	3	0	X	X	X	X	8

Player percentages
Scotland		Canada	
Euan Byers	85%	Maxime Elmaleh	85%
Warwick Smith	80%	Éric Sylvain	89%
Ewan MacDonald	53%	François Roberge	83%
David Murdoch	52%	Jean-Michel Ménard	89%
Total	67%	Total	86%

=== 3 vs. 4 game ===
April 7, 19:00

Sheet C	1	2	3	4	5	6	7	8	9	10	Final
Norway (Ulsrud)	0	3	0	0	3	0	0	1	0	1	8
United States (Fenson)	0	0	0	2	0	2	0	0	1	0	5

Player percentages
Norway		United States	
Jan Thoresen	79%	John Shuster	95%
Thomas Due	83%	Joseph Polo	90%
Torger Nergård	85%	Shawn Rojeski	79%
Thomas Ulsrud	87%	Pete Fenson	76%
Total	84%	Total	85%

=== Semi-final ===
April 8, 13:00

Sheet C	1	2	3	4	5	6	7	8	9	10	Final
Scotland (Murdoch)	0	1	0	0	2	0	1	0	0	2	6
Norway (Ulsrud)	0	0	2	1	0	0	0	0	1	0	4

Player percentages
Scotland		Norway	
Euan Byers	74%	Jan Thoresen	75%
Warwick Smith	73%	Thomas Due	68%
Ewan MacDonald	68%	Torger Nergård	69%
David Murdoch	75%	Thomas Ulsrud	68%
Total	73%	Total	70%

=== Final ===
April 9, 12:30

Sheet C	1	2	3	4	5	6	7	8	9	10	Final
Canada (Ménard)	0	1	0	1	0	2	0	0	0	0	4
Scotland (Murdoch)	1	0	1	0	2	0	0	0	2	1	7

Player percentages
Scotland		Canada	
Euan Byers	81%	Maxime Elmaleh	85%
Warwick Smith	82%	Éric Sylvain	76%
Ewan MacDonald	86%	François Roberge	72%
David Murdoch	87%	Jean-Michel Ménard	76%
Total	84%	Total	77%

2006 Ford World Curling Championship
(Scotland)
Scotland
4th title

== Round robin player percentages ==
Leads	%	Seconds	%	Thirds	%	Skips	%
(Canada) Maxime Elmaleh	89	(Scotland) Warwick Smith	86	(Scotland) Ewan MacDonald	86	(Scotland) David Murdoch	87
(Denmark) Joel Ostrowski	84	(United States) Joe Polo	86	(Finland) Markku Uusipaavalniemi	85	(Norway) Thomas Ulsrud	84
(Switzerland) Simon Strübin	84	(Canada) Eric Sylvain	84	(Sweden) Niklas Edin	83	(Canada) Jean-Michel Ménard	82
(United States) John Shuster	84	(Sweden) Marcus Hasselborg	84	(Switzerland) Claudio Pescia	81	(Sweden) Nils Carlsén	82
(Scotland) Euan Byers	82	(Switzerland) Pascal Sieber	82	(United States) Shawn Rojeski	81	(United States) Pete Fenson	80
