= 2003 World Men's Curling Championship =

2003 Ford World Men's Curling Championship
- Host city: Winnipeg, Manitoba, Canada
- Arena: Winnipeg Arena
- Dates: April 5–13, 2003
- Winner: Canada
- Curling club: Avonair CC, Edmonton, Alberta
- Skip: Randy Ferbey
- Third: David Nedohin
- Second: Scott Pfeifer
- Lead: Marcel Rocque
- Alternate: Dan Holowaychuk
- Coach: Brian Moore
- Finalist: Switzerland (Ralph Stöckli)

The 2003 World Men's Curling Championship (branded as 2003 Ford World Men's Curling Championship for sponsorship reasons) was held at the Winnipeg Arena in Winnipeg, Manitoba, Canada from April 5–13, 2003.

== Teams ==
Canada	Denmark	Finland	Germany
Avonair CC, Edmonton, Alberta Fourth: David Nedohin; Skip: Randy Ferbey; Second: Scott Pfeifer; Lead: Marcel Rocque; Alternate: Dan Holowaychuk	Hvidovre CC, Hvidovre Skip: Ulrik Schmidt; Third: Lasse Lavrsen; Second: Carsten Svensgaard; Lead: Joel Ostrowski; Alternate: Christian Hansen	Oulunkylän Curlinghalli, Helsinki Skip: Markku Uusipaavalniemi; Third: Kalle Kiiskinen; Second: Aku Kauste; Lead: Teemu Salo; Alternate: Tony Träskelin	CC Schwenningen, Schwenningen Skip: Andreas Lang; Third: Rainer Beiter; Second: Jürgen Beck; Lead: Sebastian Schweizer; Alternate: Jörg Engesser
South Korea	Norway	Scotland	Sweden
Gyeong-buk CC, Gyeongbuk Skip: Lee Dong-Keun; Third: Kim Soo-Hyuk; Second: Park Jae-Cheol; Lead: Choi Min-Suk; Alternate: Ko Seung-Wan	Stabekk CC, Oslo Skip: Pål Trulsen; Third: Lars Vågberg; Second: Flemming Davanger; Lead: Bent Ånund Ramsfjell; Alternate: Niels Siggaard Andersen	St. Martins CC, Perth Skip: Warwick Smith; Third: Peter Smith; Second: Ewan MacDonald; Lead: David Hay; Alternate: Graham Cormack	Sundsvalls CK, Sundsvall Skip: Per Carlsén; Third: Mikael Norberg; Second: Rickard Hallström; Lead: Fredrik Hallström; Alternate: Niklas Berggren
Switzerland	United States		
St. Galler Bär CC, Zürich Skip: Ralph Stöckli; Third: Claudio Pescia; Second: Pascal Sieber; Lead: Simon Strübin; Alternate: Marco Battilana	Bemidji CC, Bemidji, Minnesota Skip: Pete Fenson; Third: Eric Fenson; Second: Shawn Rojeski; Lead: John Shuster; Alternate: Scott Baird		

== Round robin standings ==
Key
Teams to playoffs

Country	Skip	W	L
Canada	Randy Ferbey	8	1
Finland	Markku Uusipaavalniemi	7	2
Switzerland	Ralph Stöckli	7	2
Norway	Pål Trulsen	6	3
Sweden	Per Carlsén	5	4
Denmark	Ulrik Schmidt	4	5
Scotland	Peter Smith	4	5
United States	Pete Fenson	2	7
Germany	Andreas Lang	1	8
South Korea	Dong-Keun Lee	1	8

== Round robin results ==
=== Draw 1 ===
April 5, 2003 13:00

Sheet A	1	2	3	4	5	6	7	8	9	10	Final
South Korea (Lee)	0	3	0	1	0	0	1	0	2	0	7
Scotland (Smith)	0	0	2	0	0	3	0	3	0	0	8

Sheet B	1	2	3	4	5	6	7	8	9	10	Final
Norway (Trulsen)	0	0	2	0	0	2	0	X	X	X	4
Switzerland (Stöckli)	1	1	0	3	4	0	2	X	X	X	11

Sheet C	1	2	3	4	5	6	7	8	9	10	Final
United States (Fenson)	0	0	0	1	1	1	0	1	0	0	4
Denmark (Schmidt)	0	1	1	0	0	0	3	0	3	1	9

Sheet D	1	2	3	4	5	6	7	8	9	10	Final
Sweden (Carlsén)	1	0	0	1	1	3	0	0	0	0	6
Finland (Uusipaavalniemi)	0	3	1	0	0	0	0	1	2	2	9

Sheet E	1	2	3	4	5	6	7	8	9	10	Final
Canada (Ferbey)	0	2	0	2	2	0	0	3	0	X	9
Germany (Lang)	1	0	1	0	0	0	2	0	1	X	5

=== Draw 2 ===
April 6, 2003 08:00

Sheet A	1	2	3	4	5	6	7	8	9	10	Final
Canada (Ferbey)	1	0	3	1	0	2	0	2	X	X	9
Norway (Trulsen)	0	1	0	0	1	0	1	0	X	X	3

Sheet B	1	2	3	4	5	6	7	8	9	10	Final
Denmark (Schmidt)	0	0	3	0	0	3	0	1	1	X	8
Germany (Lang)	0	2	0	0	1	0	1	0	0	X	4

Sheet C	1	2	3	4	5	6	7	8	9	10	Final
South Korea (Lee)	1	0	1	0	0	0	1	0	0	X	3
Sweden (Carlsén)	0	3	0	3	1	2	0	1	0	X	10

Sheet D	1	2	3	4	5	6	7	8	9	10	Final
United States (Fenson)	1	0	1	0	0	0	1	1	0	0	4
Scotland (Smith)	0	0	0	3	1	1	0	0	2	0	7

Sheet E	1	2	3	4	5	6	7	8	9	10	Final
Switzerland (Stöckli)	0	2	0	1	0	2	1	0	1	0	7
Finland (Uusipaavalniemi)	2	0	1	0	1	0	0	2	0	2	8

=== Draw 3 ===
April 6, 2003 18:00

Sheet A	1	2	3	4	5	6	7	8	9	10	Final
Finland (Uusipaavalniemi)	2	1	0	2	0	1	1	0	2	X	9
Germany (Lang)	0	0	1	0	1	0	0	1	0	X	3

Sheet B	1	2	3	4	5	6	7	8	9	10	Final
Scotland (Smith)	2	0	0	1	1	0	1	0	0	0	5
Sweden (Carlsén)	0	1	0	0	0	0	0	1	0	0	2

Sheet C	1	2	3	4	5	6	7	8	9	10	Final
Switzerland (Stöckli)	0	0	1	0	2	0	3	0	X	X	6
Canada (Ferbey)	2	1	0	3	0	3	0	2	X	X	11

Sheet D	1	2	3	4	5	6	7	8	9	10	Final
Denmark (Schmidt)	1	0	0	1	0	0	1	0	X	X	3
South Korea (Lee)	0	0	3	0	4	2	0	1	X	X	10

Sheet E	1	2	3	4	5	6	7	8	9	10	Final
United States (Fenson)	0	0	0	0	0	1	1	0	2	X	4
Norway (Trulsen)	0	1	1	3	2	0	0	1	0	X	8

=== Draw 4 ===
April 7, 2003 13:00

Sheet A	1	2	3	4	5	6	7	8	9	10	Final
Scotland (Smith)	0	0	0	0	1	0	2	0	1	0	4
Switzerland (Stöckli)	0	0	1	0	0	2	0	2	0	1	6

Sheet B	1	2	3	4	5	6	7	8	9	10	Final
United States (Fenson)	0	0	1	0	2	0	0	1	0	2	6
South Korea (Lee)	0	2	0	0	0	1	1	0	1	0	5

Sheet C	1	2	3	4	5	6	7	8	9	10	Final
Norway (Trulsen)	0	0	2	0	2	0	2	2	0	1	9
Germany (Lang)	0	1	0	1	0	2	0	0	3	0	7

Sheet D	1	2	3	4	5	6	7	8	9	10	Final
Finland (Uusipaavalniemi)	1	0	1	0	0	1	1	0	2	0	6
Canada (Ferbey)	0	2	0	3	1	0	0	1	0	1	8

Sheet E	1	2	3	4	5	6	7	8	9	10	Final
Sweden (Carlsén)	0	0	3	0	2	0	2	0	2	0	9
Denmark (Schmidt)	0	0	0	1	0	2	0	2	0	1	6

=== Draw 5 ===
April 8, 2003 08:00

Sheet A	1	2	3	4	5	6	7	8	9	10	Final
United States (Fenson)	1	1	0	1	0	1	0	2	1	0	7
Canada (Ferbey)	0	0	2	0	2	0	4	0	0	1	9

Sheet B	1	2	3	4	5	6	7	8	9	10	Final
Switzerland (Stöckli)	0	0	2	1	0	2	0	1	3	1	10
Denmark (Schmidt)	0	2	0	0	1	0	1	0	0	0	4

Sheet C	1	2	3	4	5	6	7	8	9	10	Final
Scotland (Smith)	2	0	0	0	0	0	1	0	0	X	3
Finland (Uusipaavalniemi)	0	0	2	1	1	1	0	2	1	X	8

Sheet D	1	2	3	4	5	6	7	8	9	10	Final
Norway (Trulsen)	1	0	1	0	1	0	0	2	0	0	5
Sweden (Carlsén)	0	1	0	1	0	1	1	0	0	2	6

Sheet E	1	2	3	4	5	6	7	8	9	10	Final
Germany (Lang)	1	0	2	2	0	1	0	0	1	1	8
South Korea (Lee)	0	2	0	0	1	0	2	0	0	0	5

=== Draw 6 ===
April 8, 2003 18:00

Sheet A	1	2	3	4	5	6	7	8	9	10	Final
Germany (Lang)	0	1	0	1	0	0	0	1	0	X	3
Sweden (Carlsén)	1	0	3	0	0	3	0	0	2	X	9

Sheet B	1	2	3	4	5	6	7	8	9	10	11	Final
South Korea (Lee)	0	1	0	1	0	0	1	0	0	2	0	5
Finland (Uusipaavalniemi)	0	0	2	0	1	0	0	1	1	0	1	6

Sheet C	1	2	3	4	5	6	7	8	9	10	Final
Denmark (Schmidt)	0	0	0	2	1	0	0	0	0	1	4
Norway (Trulsen)	0	1	2	0	0	0	0	0	3	0	6

Sheet D	1	2	3	4	5	6	7	8	9	10	Final
Switzerland (Stöckli)	2	0	0	0	2	0	1	2	0	0	7
United States (Fenson)	0	0	1	0	0	1	0	0	2	0	4

Sheet E	1	2	3	4	5	6	7	8	9	10	Final
Scotland (Smith)	0	1	0	1	0	0	0	0	2	0	4
Canada (Ferbey)	3	0	2	0	0	0	0	1	0	1	7

=== Draw 7 ===
April 9, 2003 13:00

Sheet A	1	2	3	4	5	6	7	8	9	10	Final
Norway (Trulsen)	0	0	2	0	1	0	2	0	1	1	7
South Korea (Lee)	0	1	0	0	0	1	0	1	0	0	3

Sheet B	1	2	3	4	5	6	7	8	9	10	Final
Germany (Lang)	4	0	1	0	0	2	0	1	0	0	8
Scotland (Smith)	0	2	0	2	1	0	1	0	2	2	10

Sheet C	1	2	3	4	5	6	7	8	9	10	Final
Sweden (Carlsén)	0	0	0	1	0	0	2	0	0	0	3
Switzerland (Stöckli)	0	0	0	0	0	1	0	2	2	3	8

Sheet D	1	2	3	4	5	6	7	8	9	10	Final
Canada (Ferbey)	0	0	2	0	2	1	0	0	2	0	7
Denmark (Schmidt)	2	1	0	2	0	0	1	1	0	2	9

Sheet E	1	2	3	4	5	6	7	8	9	10	Final
Finland (Uusipaavalniemi)	0	2	1	0	2	0	1	0	0	0	6
United States (Fenson)	0	0	0	2	0	0	0	1	1	1	5

=== Draw 8 ===
April 10, 2003 08:00

Sheet A	1	2	3	4	5	6	7	8	9	10	Final
Denmark (Schmidt)	0	0	1	0	1	0	0	1	0	X	3
Finland (Uusipaavalniemi)	0	2	0	1	0	1	2	0	1	X	7

Sheet B	1	2	3	4	5	6	7	8	9	10	Final
Sweden (Carlsén)	0	0	0	1	0	1	0	1	X	X	3
Canada (Ferbey)	1	0	2	0	3	0	1	0	X	X	7

Sheet C	1	2	3	4	5	6	7	8	9	10	Final
Germany (Lang)	0	1	0	0	0	0	0	2	0	X	3
United States (Fenson)	2	0	2	0	0	2	1	0	2	X	9

Sheet D	1	2	3	4	5	6	7	8	9	10	Final
Scotland (Smith)	1	0	1	0	0	1	0	0	0	X	3
Norway (Trulsen)	0	2	0	2	0	0	0	2	1	X	7

Sheet E	1	2	3	4	5	6	7	8	9	10	Final
South Korea (Lee)	0	2	0	1	0	0	1	0	0	1	5
Switzerland (Stöckli)	2	0	1	0	2	0	0	0	2	0	7

=== Draw 9 ===
April 10, 2003 18:00

Sheet A	1	2	3	4	5	6	7	8	9	10	Final
Sweden (Carlsén)	0	0	0	2	0	2	0	3	0	1	8
United States (Fenson)	0	0	2	0	1	0	2	0	1	0	6

Sheet B	1	2	3	4	5	6	7	8	9	10	Final
Finland (Uusipaavalniemi)	0	0	1	0	0	0	0	X	X	X	1
Norway (Trulsen)	4	0	0	2	2	0	2	X	X	X	10

Sheet C	1	2	3	4	5	6	7	8	9	10	Final
Canada (Ferbey)	1	2	2	0	1	0	1	0	0	X	7
South Korea (Lee)	0	0	0	1	0	1	0	0	1	X	3

Sheet D	1	2	3	4	5	6	7	8	9	10	Final
Germany (Lang)	0	0	1	0	0	0	X	X	X	X	1
Switzerland (Stöckli)	1	0	0	2	3	2	X	X	X	X	8

Sheet E	1	2	3	4	5	6	7	8	9	10	Final
Denmark (Schmidt)	1	0	2	0	0	3	0	6	X	X	12
Scotland (Smith)	0	1	0	1	2	0	1	0	X	X	5

== Playoffs ==
=== Brackets ===
Semi-final
1	Canada	9
4	Norway	8
3	Switzerland	7
2	Finland	1

Final
1	Canada	10
3	Switzerland	6
Bronze medal
4	Norway	9
2	Finland	7

=== Semi-final ===
April 12, 2003 08:00

Sheet B	1	2	3	4	5	6	7	8	9	10	Final
Canada (Ferbey)	1	0	0	2	0	3	0	1	0	2	9
Norway (Trulsen)	0	0	3	0	2	0	1	0	2	0	8

Player percentages
Canada		Norway	
Marcel Rocque	84%	Bent Ånund Ramsfjell	75%
Scott Pfeifer	78%	Flemming Davanger	84%
Randy Ferbey	71%	Lars Vågberg	78%
David Nedohin	84%	Pål Trulsen	69%
Total	80%	Total	76%

Sheet C	1	2	3	4	5	6	7	8	9	10	Final
Switzerland (Stöckli)	0	1	1	1	0	0	2	2	X	X	7
Finland (Uusipaavalniemi)	0	0	0	0	1	0	0	0	X	X	1

Player percentages
Switzerland		Finland	
Simon Strübin	92%	Teemu Salo	92%
Pascal Sieber	86%	Aku Kauste	70%
Claudio Pescia	81%	Kalle Kiiskinen	80%
Ralph Stöckli	88%	Markku Uusipaavalniemi	64%
Total	87%	Total	76%

=== Bronze medal game ===
April 13, 2003 08:00

Sheet C	1	2	3	4	5	6	7	8	9	10	Final
Norway (Trulsen)	0	2	0	3	0	0	2	0	1	1	9
Finland (Uusipaavalniemi)	1	0	3	0	0	1	0	2	0	0	7

Player percentages
Norway		Finland	
Bent Ånund Ramsfjell	88%	Teemu Salo	70%
Flemming Davanger	69%	Aku Kauste	58%
Lars Vågberg	83%	Kalle Kiiskinen	60%
Pål Trulsen	80%	Markku Uusipaavalniemi	63%
Total	80%	Total	63%

=== Final ===
April 13, 2003 12:30

Sheet C	1	2	3	4	5	6	7	8	9	10	Final
Canada (Ferbey)	2	0	2	0	0	1	2	1	2	X	10
Switzerland (Stöckli)	0	3	0	2	1	0	0	0	0	X	6

Player percentages
Canada		Switzerland	
Marcel Rocque	96%	Simon Strübin	96%
Scott Pfeifer	85%	Pascal Sieber	82%
Randy Ferbey	79%	Claudio Pescia	72%
David Nedohin	72%	Ralph Stöckli	64%
Total	82%	Total	78%

2003 Ford World Curling Championship
(Canada)
Canada
28th title

== Top percentages ==
Leads	%	Seconds	%	Thirds	%	Skips	%
(Canada) Marcel Rocque	88	(Canada) Scott Pfeifer	85	(Canada) Randy Ferbey	85	(Canada) David Nedohin	84
(United States) John Shuster	87	(Norway) Flemming Davanger	84	(Switzerland) Claudio Pescia	84	(Switzerland) Ralph Stöckli	81
(Norway) Bent Ånund Ramsfjell	85	(Switzerland) Pascal Sieber	82	(Norway) Lars Vågberg	81	(Norway) Pål Trulsen	78
(Switzerland) Simon Strübin	85	(Sweden) Rickard Hallström	81	(Finland) Kalle Kiiskinen	80	(Finland) Markku Uusipaavalniemi	77
(Denmark) Joel Ostrowski	84	(Finland) Aku Kauste	80	(Sweden) Mikael Norberg	77	(Sweden) Per Carlsén	75
