= Christian Hansen (curler) =

Danish curler

- Curler ♂
- Born: 26 May 1976 (age 50)

Team
- Curling club: Hvidovre CC, Hvidovre

Curling career
- Member Association: Denmark
- World Championship: 1 (2003)
- European Championship: 1 (2002)
- Other appearances: World Junior Championships: 1 (1997)
Medal record
Curling
Danish Men's Championship
| Gold medal – first place | 2003 |

Christian Hansen (born 26 May 1976) is a Danish curler.

At the national level, he is a 2003 Danish men's champion.

== Teams ==
| Season | Skip | Third | Second | Lead | Alternate | Coach | Events |
|---|---|---|---|---|---|---|---|
| 1996–97 | Jöel Ostrowki | Kenny Tordrup | Christian Hansen | David Zeuthen | Kim Sylvest Nielsen | | DJCC 1997 (gold); WJCC 1997 (5th) |
| 2002–03 | Ulrik Schmidt | Lasse Lavrsen | Carsten Svensgaard | Joel Ostrowski | Christian Hansen | Bill Carey, Tracy Choptain | ECC 2002 (5th); DMCC 2003 (gold); WCC 2003 (6th) |
