= Pascal Sieber =

Swiss curler

- Curler ♂
- Born: 29 April 1977 (age 49); St. Gallen

Team
- Curling club: CC St. Galler Bär, St. Gallen

Curling career
- Member Association: Switzerland
- World Championship: 3 (2003, 2006, 2008)
- European Championship: 2 (2002, 2005)
- Olympic: 1 (2006)
- Other appearances: World Junior Championships: 3 (1995, 1996, 1997)
Medal record
Curling
World Championships
Silver medal – second place	2003 Winnipeg
Swiss Men's Championship
Gold medal – first place	2002 Basel/Arlesheim
Gold medal – first place	2005 Bern
Gold medal – first place	2008 Wetzikon
World Junior Championships
Gold medal – first place	1997 Karuizawa
Silver medal – second place	1996 Red Deer

Pascal Sieber (born 29 April 1977 in St. Gallen, Switzerland) is a Swiss curler.

He is a 2003 World Men's silver medallist and a three-time Swiss men's champion (2002, 2005, 2008).

He played on the 2006 Winter Olympics where Swiss men's team finished on fifth place.

== Teams ==
Season	Skip	Third	Second	Lead	Alternate	Coach	Events
1993–94	Ralph Stöckli	Pascal Erne	Pascal Sieber	Clemens Oberwiler			SJCC 1994 (gold)
1994–95	Ralph Stöckli	Michael Bösiger	Pascal Sieber	Clemens Oberwiler	Martin Zaugg (WJCC)		SJCC 1995 (gold); WJCC 1995 (7th)
1995–96	Ralph Stöckli	Michael Bösiger	Pascal Sieber	Clemens Oberwiler	Martin Zaugg (WJCC)		SJCC 1996 (gold); WJCC 1996 (silver)
1996–97	Ralph Stöckli	Michael Bösiger	Pascal Sieber	Clemens Oberwiler	Martin Zaugg (WJCC)		SJCC 1997 (gold); WJCC 1997 (gold)
2001–02	Ralph Stöckli	Claudio Pescia	Pascal Sieber	Michael Bösiger	Simon Strübin		SMCC 2002 (gold)
2002–03	Ralph Stöckli	Claudio Pescia	Pascal Sieber	Michael Bösiger	Marco Battilana	Thomas Fritsche	ECC 2002 (7th)
2002–03	Ralph Stöckli	Claudio Pescia	Pascal Sieber	Simon Strübin	Marco Battilana	Patrick Hürlimann	WCC 2003 (silver)
2003–04	Ralph Stöckli	Claudio Pescia	Pascal Sieber	Simon Strübin			
2004–05	Ralph Stöckli	Claudio Pescia	Pascal Sieber	Marco Battilana	Simon Strübin		SMCC 2005 (gold)
2005–06	Ralph Stöckli	Claudio Pescia	Pascal Sieber	Marco Battilana	Simon Strübin	Patrick Hürlimann, Heinz Schmid (ECC, WOG)	ECC 2005 (4th); WOG 2006 (5th); WCC 2006 (5th)
2006–07	Claudio Pescia	Joël Retornaz	Pascal Sieber	Marco Battilana	Mario Freiberger		
2007–08	Claudio Pescia	Andreas Hänni	Pascal Sieber	Marco Battilana	Mario Freiberger		SMCC 2008 (gold)
2007–08	Claudio Pescia	Patrick Hürlimann	Pascal Sieber	Marco Battilana	Toni Müller	Heinz Schmid	WCC 2008 (11th)
2008–09	Claudio Pescia	Pascal Sieber	Reto Seiler	Marco Battilana			
2009–10	Claudio Pescia	Pascal Sieber	Reto Seiler	Marco Battilana	Urs Beglinger		
