= 2009 World Men's Curling Championship =

- Host city: Moncton, New Brunswick, Canada
- Arena: Moncton Coliseum
- Dates: April 4–12, 2009
- Attendance: 78,470
- Winner: Scotland
- Curling club: Lockerbie Curling Club, Lockerbie
- Skip: David Murdoch
- Third: Ewan MacDonald
- Second: Peter Smith
- Lead: Euan Byers
- Alternate: Graeme Connal
- Coach: David Hay
- Finalist: Canada (Kevin Martin)

The 2009 World Men's Curling Championship (branded as 2009 Ford World Men's Curling Championship presented by Atlantic Lottery for sponsorship reasons) was held in Moncton, New Brunswick, Canada from April 4–12, 2009, at the Moncton Coliseum. The event, which formally celebrated 50 years of World Men's Curling (1959-2009) plus the 225th anniversary of the host province of New Brunswick, kicked off with a three-hour extravaganza combining the Opening Ceremonies and Opening Banquet, an unprecedented start to the World Men's Curling Championship.

In the final end of the Canada–Scotland final, Canada skip Kevin Martin opted to throw away his first stone instead of attempting to make a shot, saying "If I don't shoot, what does (Scottish skip David Murdoch) do?" The way the rock angles were set up meant that a slight miss could help Scotland, so he figured throwing it away would be his best option. The team had called two timeouts and spent several minutes discussing possible shots before Martin's throw away. Murdoch then makes his last shot, a quiet weight hit that rolled in front of a Canadian stone to sit one. This forced Martin into a difficult double takeout, which he missed, handing Scotland the World Championship.

== Qualification ==
Two teams from the Americas region (including Canada as host), two Pacific region teams (via the 2008 Pacific Curling Championships) and eight teams from the European region (via the 2008 European Curling Championships). For the first time ever, a third country from the Americas expressed intent to participate in the qualification process, necessitating a qualifying tournament between the United States and Brazil held between January 30 and February 1, 2009. Canada, as defending champions and hosts do not have to qualify, as they automatically get to participate.

- Canada (Host country and defending champion)
- United States (Americas)
- China (Pacific champion)
- Japan (Pacific runner-up)
- Top seven finishers from the 2008 European Curling Championships
  - Scotland
  - Norway
  - Germany
  - Switzerland
  - Denmark
  - France
  - Czech Republic
- Finland (winner of World Challenge series vs. Sweden)

== Teams ==
Canada	China	Czech Republic
Saville Sports Centre, Edmonton Skip: Kevin Martin; Third: John Morris; Second: Marc Kennedy; Lead: Ben Hebert; Alternate: Terry Meek	Harbin CC, Harbin Fourth: Liu Rui; Skip: Wang Fengchun*; Second: Xu Xiaoming; Lead: Zang Jialiang; Alternate: Chen Lu-An	CK Brno, Brno Skip: Jiří Snítil; Third: Martin Snítil; Second: Jindřich Kitzberger; Lead: Karel Uher; Alternate: Miloš Hoferka
Denmark	Finland	France
Hvidovre CC, Hvidovre Fourth: Johnny Frederiksen; Skip: Ulrik Schmidt*; Second: Bo Jensen; Lead: Lars Vilandt; Alternate: Mikkel Poulson	Oulunkylän Curling, Helsinki Skip: Kalle Kiiskinen; Third: Teemu Salo; Second: Jani Sullanmaa; Lead: Jari Rouvinen; Alternate: Juha Pekaristo	Chamonix CC, Chamonix Skip: Thomas Dufour; Third: Tony Angiboust; Second: Jan Ducroz; Lead: Richard Ducroz; Alternate: Raphael Mathieu
Germany	Japan	Norway
CC Füssen, Füssen Skip: Andy Kapp; Third: Andreas Lang; Second: Holger Höhne; Lead: Andreas Kempf; Alternate: Daniel Herberg	Karuizawa CC, Karuizawa Skip: Yusuke Morozumi; Third: Tsuyoshi Yamaguchi; Second: Tetsuro Shimizu; Lead: Kosuke Morozumi; Alternate: Keita Satoh	Snarøen CK, Bærum Skip: Thomas Ulsrud; Third: Torger Nergård; Second: Christoffer Svae; Lead: Håvard Vad Petersson; Alternate: Thomas Løvold
Scotland	Switzerland	United States
Lockerbie Curling Club, Lockerbie Skip: David Murdoch; Third: Ewan MacDonald; Second: Peter Smith; Lead: Euan Byers; Alternate: Graeme Connal	CC St. Galler Bär, St. Gallen Skip: Ralph Stöckli; Third: Jan Hauser; Second: Markus Eggler; Lead: Simon Strübin; Alternate: Toni Müller	Duluth Curling Club, Duluth Skip: John Shuster; Third: Jason Smith; Second: Jeff Isaacson; Lead: John Benton; Alternate: Chris Plys

* Throws third stones

== Round-robin standings ==
Final round-robin standings

Key
Teams to playoffs
Teams to tiebreaker

Country	Skip	W	L	PF	PA	Ends Won	Ends Lost	Blank Ends	Stolen Ends	Shot Pct.
Canada	Kevin Martin	10	1	92	43	47	33	7	11	88%
Scotland	David Murdoch	8	3	86	59	45	38	17	11	83%
United States	John Shuster	7	4	79	71	49	41	11	19	78%
Germany	Andy Kapp	7	4	77	66	45	46	17	10	81%
Switzerland	Ralph Stöckli	7	4	67	62	44	41	15	13	80%
Norway	Thomas Ulsrud	7	4	71	58	42	37	18	14	83%
Denmark	Ulrik Schmidt	5	6	65	74	44	44	15	12	79%
France	Thomas Dufour	4	7	52	69	33	39	19	6	75%
China	Wang Fengchun	4	7	69	78	45	47	11	11	81%
Japan	Yusuke Morozumi	3	8	59	74	38	45	11	9	79%
Czech Republic	Jiří Snítil	3	8	54	75	39	46	12	8	75%
Finland	Kalle Kiiskinen	1	10	48	90	35	49	7	7	74%

== Round-robin results ==
All draw times local (GMT-3 or Atlantic Daylight Time)

=== Draw 1 ===
April 4, 3:00pm

Sheet A	1	2	3	4	5	6	7	8	9	10	11	Final
Scotland (Murdoch) 🔨	0	1	0	2	1	1	0	1	1	0	0	7
Switzerland (Stöckli)	1	0	2	0	0	0	2	0	0	2	3	10

Sheet B	1	2	3	4	5	6	7	8	9	10	Final
Norway (Ulsrud) 🔨	2	0	0	1	0	0	2	0	0	2	7
Denmark (Schmidt)	0	0	1	0	0	1	0	2	2	0	6

Sheet C	1	2	3	4	5	6	7	8	9	10	11	Final
Czech Republic (Snítil) 🔨	0	2	0	0	0	0	0	2	0	2	0	6
Finland (Kiiskinen)	0	0	1	1	2	0	1	0	1	0	2	8

Sheet D	1	2	3	4	5	6	7	8	9	10	Final
Germany (Kapp) 🔨	0	2	0	1	0	0	0	1	1	0	5
United States (Shuster)	1	0	1	0	1	1	1	0	0	1	6

=== Draw 2 ===
April 4, 7:30pm

Sheet A	1	2	3	4	5	6	7	8	9	10	Final
Finland (Kiiskinen) 🔨	0	0	0	0	1	0	X	X	X	X	1
Norway (Ulsrud)	1	1	1	2	0	4	X	X	X	X	9

Sheet B	1	2	3	4	5	6	7	8	9	10	Final
Japan (Morozumi)	0	1	0	1	0	1	0	1	0	X	4
Canada (Martin) 🔨	1	0	1	0	3	0	1	0	1	X	7

Sheet C	1	2	3	4	5	6	7	8	9	10	Final
France (Dufour) 🔨	0	0	0	1	0	2	0	3	0	1	7
China (Wang)	0	0	0	0	1	0	1	0	3	0	5

Sheet D	1	2	3	4	5	6	7	8	9	10	Final
Czech Republic (Snítil) 🔨	0	1	1	1	0	4	1	0	1	X	9
Denmark (Schmidt)	1	0	0	0	1	0	0	2	0	X	4

=== Draw 3 ===
April 5, 8:30am

Sheet B	1	2	3	4	5	6	7	8	9	10	Final
United States (Shuster) 🔨	1	0	4	0	0	0	1	0	X	X	6
Scotland (Murdoch)	0	4	0	1	0	1	0	6	X	X	12

Sheet C	1	2	3	4	5	6	7	8	9	10	11	Final
Germany (Kapp) 🔨	0	1	2	0	0	3	0	1	0	2	1	10
Switzerland (Stöckli)	1	0	0	1	1	0	2	0	4	0	0	9

=== Draw 4 ===
April 5, 1:00pm

Sheet A	1	2	3	4	5	6	7	8	9	10	Final
Canada (Martin) 🔨	0	2	0	2	3	0	X	X	X	X	7
France (Dufour)	1	0	0	0	0	1	X	X	X	X	2

Sheet B	1	2	3	4	5	6	7	8	9	10	Final
Denmark (Schmidt)	2	0	1	0	0	0	3	0	0	1	7
Finland (Kiiskinen) 🔨	0	1	0	2	1	0	0	1	0	0	5

Sheet C	1	2	3	4	5	6	7	8	9	10	Final
Norway (Ulsrud) 🔨	1	1	0	1	3	1	0	1	X	X	8
Czech Republic (Snítil)	0	0	0	0	0	0	2	0	X	X	2

Sheet D	1	2	3	4	5	6	7	8	9	10	Final
Japan (Morozumi) 🔨	2	1	0	0	0	3	4	X	X	X	10
China (Wang)	0	0	0	1	1	0	0	X	X	X	2

=== Draw 5 ===
April 5, 7:30pm

Sheet A	1	2	3	4	5	6	7	8	9	10	Final
Switzerland (Stöckli) 🔨	0	2	0	0	0	1	0	X	X	X	3
United States (Shuster)	2	0	3	0	1	0	4	X	X	X	10

Sheet B	1	2	3	4	5	6	7	8	9	10	Final
France (Dufour) 🔨	2	1	0	2	1	0	0	2	X	X	8
Japan (Morozumi)	0	0	1	0	0	1	0	0	X	X	2

Sheet C	1	2	3	4	5	6	7	8	9	10	Final
China (Wang) 🔨	0	1	0	1	0	0	2	0	X	X	4
Canada (Martin)	1	0	3	0	3	1	0	1	X	X	9

Sheet D	1	2	3	4	5	6	7	8	9	10	Final
Scotland (Murdoch) 🔨	0	3	0	2	0	4	0	0	2	X	11
Germany (Kapp)	0	0	4	0	2	0	0	2	0	X	8

=== Draw 6 ===
April 6, 10:00am

Sheet A	1	2	3	4	5	6	7	8	9	10	11	Final
Germany (Kapp)	0	2	0	3	0	1	0	2	0	0	1	9
Czech Republic (Snítil) 🔨	2	0	2	0	1	0	2	0	0	1	0	8

Sheet B	1	2	3	4	5	6	7	8	9	10	Final
United States (Shuster) 🔨	0	1	0	1	0	0	2	0	1	0	5
Norway (Ulsrud)	1	0	0	0	0	2	0	2	0	2	7

Sheet C	1	2	3	4	5	6	7	8	9	10	Final
Scotland (Murdoch)	0	2	0	1	1	1	0	2	X	X	7
Finland (Kiiskinen) 🔨	1	0	1	0	0	0	0	0	X	X	2

Sheet D	1	2	3	4	5	6	7	8	9	10	Final
Switzerland (Stöckli)	0	0	2	0	2	0	3	0	1	1	9
Denmark (Schmidt) 🔨	1	1	0	2	0	2	0	0	0	0	6

=== Draw 7 ===
April 6, 3:00pm

Sheet A	1	2	3	4	5	6	7	8	9	10	Final
Norway (Ulsrud) 🔨	0	0	2	1	0	2	0	2	0	0	7
China (Wang)	0	1	0	0	1	0	2	0	1	1	6

Sheet B	1	2	3	4	5	6	7	8	9	10	Final
Czech Republic (Snítil)	0	1	0	2	0	1	0	X	X	X	4
Canada (Martin) 🔨	2	0	4	0	2	0	2	X	X	X	10

Sheet C	1	2	3	4	5	6	7	8	9	10	Final
Denmark (Schmidt)	0	0	2	0	1	0	1	0	3	X	7
France (Dufour) 🔨	1	0	0	0	0	1	0	1	0	X	3

Sheet D	1	2	3	4	5	6	7	8	9	10	Final
Finland (Kiiskinen) 🔨	2	0	2	0	2	0	0	1	0	0	7
Japan (Morozumi)	0	2	0	1	0	2	1	0	2	2	10

=== Draw 8 ===
April 6, 7:30pm

Sheet A	1	2	3	4	5	6	7	8	9	10	Final
Japan (Morozumi) 🔨	1	0	2	0	0	0	1	0	0	1	5
Scotland (Murdoch)	0	2	0	3	0	0	0	2	0	0	7

Sheet B	1	2	3	4	5	6	7	8	9	10	Final
France (Dufour)	0	0	2	1	0	0	2	0	0	1	6
Switzerland (Stöckli) 🔨	1	0	0	0	1	1	0	2	0	0	5

Sheet C	1	2	3	4	5	6	7	8	9	10	Final
Canada (Martin) 🔨	2	0	1	0	1	1	0	1	0	X	6
Germany (Kapp)	0	1	0	2	0	0	1	0	0	X	4

Sheet D	1	2	3	4	5	6	7	8	9	10	11	Final
China (Wang) 🔨	1	1	0	2	0	0	2	1	1	0	0	8
United States (Shuster)	0	0	4	0	2	0	0	0	0	2	1	9

=== Draw 9 ===
April 7, 10:00am

Sheet A	1	2	3	4	5	6	7	8	9	10	Final
Canada (Martin)	2	0	2	0	2	0	2	X	X	X	8
Switzerland (Stöckli) 🔨	0	1	0	1	0	1	0	X	X	X	3

Sheet B	1	2	3	4	5	6	7	8	9	10	Final
China (Wang)	3	0	0	1	0	0	3	0	2	X	9
Scotland (Murdoch) 🔨	0	1	2	0	0	2	0	2	0	X	7

Sheet C	1	2	3	4	5	6	7	8	9	10	Final
Japan (Morozumi)	0	0	0	1	0	0	X	X	X	X	1
United States (Shuster) 🔨	2	1	2	0	0	4	X	X	X	X	9

Sheet D	1	2	3	4	5	6	7	8	9	10	Final
France (Dufour) 🔨	0	0	2	0	0	1	0	2	0	0	5
Germany (Kapp)	0	0	0	2	0	0	2	0	2	1	7

=== Draw 10 ===
April 7, 3:00pm

Sheet A	1	2	3	4	5	6	7	8	9	10	Final
United States (Shuster)	1	0	0	0	1	0	2	0	2	0	6
Denmark (Schmidt) 🔨	0	2	1	0	0	2	0	2	0	2	9

Sheet B	1	2	3	4	5	6	7	8	9	10	Final
Germany (Kapp) 🔨	0	2	3	1	0	1	1	0	X	X	8
Finland (Kiiskinen)	1	0	0	0	1	0	0	2	X	X	4

Sheet C	1	2	3	4	5	6	7	8	9	10	Final
Switzerland (Stöckli)	1	0	0	1	0	0	0	0	0	1	3
Norway (Ulsrud) 🔨	0	0	1	0	0	0	0	0	1	0	2

Sheet D	1	2	3	4	5	6	7	8	9	10	Final
Scotland (Murdoch)	0	2	0	1	0	0	0	0	1	0	4
Czech Republic (Snítil) 🔨	1	0	1	0	0	1	0	1	0	1	5

=== Draw 11 ===
April 7, 7:30pm

Sheet A	1	2	3	4	5	6	7	8	9	10	Final
Finland (Kiiskinen)	0	1	0	0	0	1	X	X	X	X	2
France (Dufour) 🔨	1	0	0	3	4	0	X	X	X	X	8

Sheet B	1	2	3	4	5	6	7	8	9	10	Final
Czech Republic (Snítil) 🔨	1	1	0	0	1	0	0	X	X	X	3
China (Wang)	0	0	1	4	0	1	3	X	X	X	9

Sheet C	1	2	3	4	5	6	7	8	9	10	Final
Denmark (Schmidt) 🔨	0	1	1	3	0	1	0	1	1	X	8
Japan (Morozumi)	0	0	0	0	3	0	1	0	0	X	4

Sheet D	1	2	3	4	5	6	7	8	9	10	Final
Norway (Ulsrud) 🔨	0	1	0	1	0	0	X	X	X	X	2
Canada (Martin)	3	0	2	0	0	4	X	X	X	X	9

=== Draw 12 ===
April 8, 10:00am

Sheet A	1	2	3	4	5	6	7	8	9	10	Final
Czech Republic (Snítil) 🔨	0	0	1	0	2	0	X	X	X	X	3
Japan (Morozumi)	2	1	0	2	0	4	X	X	X	X	9

Sheet B	1	2	3	4	5	6	7	8	9	10	Final
Norway (Ulsrud)	3	0	4	0	3	0	X	X	X	X	10
France (Dufour)🔨	0	1	0	2	0	1	X	X	X	X	4

Sheet C	1	2	3	4	5	6	7	8	9	10	Final
Finland (Kiiskinen)	0	2	0	2	0	0	X	X	X	X	4
Canada (Martin) 🔨	4	0	3	0	4	1	X	X	X	X	12

Sheet D	1	2	3	4	5	6	7	8	9	10	11	Final
Denmark (Schmidt)	0	1	0	0	0	2	0	1	0	2	0	6
China (Wang) 🔨	1	0	2	0	1	0	0	0	2	0	1	7

=== Draw 13 ===
April 8, 3:00pm

Sheet A	1	2	3	4	5	6	7	8	9	10	Final
China (Wang) 🔨	1	0	1	0	1	0	1	0	2	0	6
Germany (Kapp)	0	1	0	1	0	2	0	3	0	1	8

Sheet B	1	2	3	4	5	6	7	8	9	10	Final
Canada (Martin) 🔨	0	2	0	4	0	2	0	0	1	X	9
United States (Shuster)	2	0	1	0	1	0	0	2	0	X	6

Sheet C	1	2	3	4	5	6	7	8	9	10	Final
France (Dufour)	0	1	0	0	0	0	0	X	X	X	1
Scotland (Murdoch) 🔨	2	0	0	4	0	0	3	X	X	X	9

Sheet D	1	2	3	4	5	6	7	8	9	10	Final
Japan (Morozumi)	0	0	1	1	0	0	1	1	0	X	4
Switzerland (Stöckli) 🔨	0	2	0	0	2	2	0	0	1	X	7

=== Draw 14 ===
April 8, 7:30pm

Sheet A	1	2	3	4	5	6	7	8	9	10	11	Final
Scotland (Murdoch)	0	1	0	1	0	0	2	0	1	0	1	6
Norway (Ulsrud) 🔨	1	0	1	0	0	0	0	2	0	1	0	5

Sheet B	1	2	3	4	5	6	7	8	9	10	Final
Switzerland (Stöckli) 🔨	1	0	1	0	0	0	2	0	1	X	5
Czech Republic (Snítil)	0	0	0	0	1	0	0	1	0	X	2

Sheet C	1	2	3	4	5	6	7	8	9	10	Final
Germany (Kapp)	0	0	0	0	2	0	0	2	0	0	4
Denmark (Schmidt) 🔨	1	1	0	0	0	1	1	0	0	1	5

Sheet D	1	2	3	4	5	6	7	8	9	10	Final
United States (Shuster)	0	0	1	1	1	0	1	0	2	0	6
Finland (Kiiskinen) 🔨	2	1	0	0	0	0	0	1	0	1	5

=== Draw 15 ===
April 9, 10:00am

Sheet A	1	2	3	4	5	6	7	8	9	10	Final
Denmark (Schmidt)	0	0	2	0	1	0	0	1	0	X	4
Canada (Martin) 🔨	4	1	0	1	0	2	0	0	2	X	10

Sheet B	1	2	3	4	5	6	7	8	9	10	Final
Finland (Kiiskinen)	1	0	0	1	0	2	0	2	0	1	7
China (Wang) 🔨	0	1	1	0	2	0	4	0	1	0	9

Sheet C	1	2	3	4	5	6	7	8	9	10	Final
Norway (Ulsrud)	0	1	0	0	2	0	2	3	1	2	11
Japan (Morozumi) 🔨	1	0	4	1	0	1	0	0	0	0	7

Sheet D	1	2	3	4	5	6	7	8	9	10	Final
Czech Republic (Snítil) 🔨	0	1	0	2	1	0	1	0	1	X	6
France (Dufour)	0	0	1	0	0	1	0	0	0	X	2

=== Draw 16 ===
April 9, 3:00pm

Sheet A	1	2	3	4	5	6	7	8	9	10	Final
Switzerland (Stöckli) 🔨	2	1	2	0	3	0	X	X	X	X	8
Finland (Kiiskinen)	0	0	0	1	0	2	X	X	X	X	3

Sheet B	1	2	3	4	5	6	7	8	9	10	Final
Scotland (Murdoch) 🔨	2	1	0	4	0	4	X	X	X	X	11
Denmark (Schmidt)	0	0	2	0	1	0	X	X	X	X	3

Sheet C	1	2	3	4	5	6	7	8	9	10	Final
United States (Shuster)	1	1	1	0	1	0	0	3	0	0	7
Czech Republic (Snítil) 🔨	0	0	0	2	0	0	1	0	2	1	6

Sheet D	1	2	3	4	5	6	7	8	9	10	Final
Germany (Kapp)	1	0	0	0	0	2	0	0	2	4	9
Norway (Ulsrud) 🔨	0	0	0	0	2	0	0	1	0	0	3

=== Draw 17 ===
April 9, 7:30pm

Sheet A	1	2	3	4	5	6	7	8	9	10	Final
France (Dufour)	2	0	0	0	3	0	1	0	0	0	6
United States (Shuster) 🔨	0	1	0	1	0	1	0	1	1	4	9

Sheet B	1	2	3	4	5	6	7	8	9	10	Final
Japan (Morozumi) 🔨	1	0	1	0	1	0	0	0	0	0	3
Germany (Kapp)	0	2	0	1	0	0	0	1	0	1	5

Sheet C	1	2	3	4	5	6	7	8	9	10	Final
China (Wang)	0	0	1	0	1	0	0	2	0	0	4
Switzerland (Stöckli) 🔨	1	0	0	1	0	1	1	0	0	1	5

Sheet D	1	2	3	4	5	6	7	8	9	10	11	Final
Canada (Martin)	0	1	0	1	0	1	0	0	1	1	0	5
Scotland (Murdoch) 🔨	1	0	1	0	0	0	0	3	0	0	1	6

== Tiebreakers ==
April 10, 3:00pm

Sheet B	1	2	3	4	5	6	7	8	9	10	Final
Norway (Ulsrud) 🔨	2	1	0	2	2	0	3	X	X	X	10
United States (Shuster)	0	0	1	0	0	1	0	X	X	X	2

Sheet D	1	2	3	4	5	6	7	8	9	10	Final
Germany (Kapp) 🔨	2	0	1	0	0	2	0	1	1	0	7
Switzerland (Stöckli)	0	1	0	3	0	0	3	0	0	1	8

== Playoffs ==
Page playoff system
1	Canada	5
2	Scotland	7
3	Switzerland	5
4	Norway	4

Semifinal
1	Canada	6
3	Switzerland	5

Gold medal game
2	Scotland	7
1	Canada	6

Bronze medal game
3	Switzerland	4
4	Norway	6

=== 1 vs. 2 ===
April 10, 7:30pm

Sheet C	1	2	3	4	5	6	7	8	9	10	Final
Canada (Martin) 🔨	1	0	0	0	2	0	1	0	1	0	5
Scotland (Murdoch)	0	3	0	1	0	1	0	1	0	1	7

Player percentages
Canada		Scotland	
Ben Hebert	96%	Euan Byers	98%
Marc Kennedy	81%	Peter Smith	66%
John Morris	79%	Ewan MacDonald	89%
Kevin Martin	72%	David Murdoch	80%
Total	82%	Total	83%

=== 3 vs. 4 ===
April 11, 10:00am

Sheet C	1	2	3	4	5	6	7	8	9	10	11	Final
Switzerland (Stöckli) 🔨	1	0	1	0	0	1	0	0	1	0	1	5
Norway (Ulsrud)	0	1	0	1	0	0	0	1	0	1	0	4

Player percentages
Switzerland		Norway	
Simon Strübin	91%	Håvard Vad Petersson	86%
Markus Eggler	85%	Christoffer Svae	92%
Jan Hauser	82%	Torger Nergård	84%
Ralph Stöckli	78%	Thomas Ulsrud	72%
Total	84%	Total	84%

=== Semifinal ===
April 11, 4:00pm

Sheet C	1	2	3	4	5	6	7	8	9	10	Final
Switzerland (Stöckli)	0	0	1	0	0	0	0	2	1	1	5
Canada (Martin) 🔨	1	1	0	0	0	3	1	0	0	0	6

Player percentages
Switzerland		Canada	
Simon Strübin	90%	Ben Hebert	97%
Markus Eggler	84%	Marc Kennedy	95%
Jan Hauser	90%	John Morris	88%
Ralph Stöckli	85%	Kevin Martin	90%
Total	87%	Total	93%

=== Bronze medal game ===
April 12, 1:00pm

Sheet C	1	2	3	4	5	6	7	8	9	10	Final
Switzerland (Stöckli) 🔨	1	0	0	1	0	0	2	0	0	X	4
Norway (Ulsrud)	0	1	1	0	1	0	0	2	1	X	6

Player percentages
Switzerland		Norway	
Simon Strübin	89%	Håvard Vad Petersson	80%
Markus Eggler	88%	Christoffer Svae	90%
Jan Hauser	70%	Torger Nergård	85%
Ralph Stöckli	63%	Thomas Ulsrud	84%
Total	78%	Total	85%

=== Gold medal game ===
April 12, 7:30pm

Sheet C	1	2	3	4	5	6	7	8	9	10	Final
Scotland (Murdoch) 🔨	2	0	1	0	0	1	0	0	2	1	7
Canada (Martin)	0	2	0	2	0	0	1	1	0	0	6

Player percentages
Scotland		Canada	
Euan Byers	90%	Ben Hebert	91%
Peter Smith	73%	Marc Kennedy	94%
Ewan MacDonald	88%	John Morris	85%
David Murdoch	91%	Kevin Martin	89%
Total	85%	Total	90%

2009 Ford World Men's Curling Championship Winners
(Scotland)
Scotland
5th title

== Player percentages ==
Top five percentages per position during the round robin.

Leads	%	Seconds	%	Thirds	%	Skips	%
(Canada) Ben Hebert	89	(Canada) Marc Kennedy	90	(Scotland) Ewan MacDonald	88	(Canada) Kevin Martin	88
(Norway) Håvard Vad Petersson	88	(Scotland) Peter Smith	85	(Canada) John Morris	87	(Scotland) David Murdoch	80
(Germany) Andreas Kempf	88	(Denmark) Bo Jensen	83	(Norway) Torger Nergård	83	(China) Liu Rui	79
(Japan) Kosuke Morozumi	86	(Norway) Christoffer Svae	83	(China) Wang Fengchun	82	(Norway) Thomas Ulsrud	79
(Switzerland) Simon Strübin	85	(China) Xu Xiaoming	81	(Japan) Tsuyoshi Yamaguchi	79	(Switzerland) Ralph Stöckli	78
