= Joel Ostrowski =

Danish male curler and coach

- Curler ♂
- Born: 5 August 1975 (age 51); Copenhagen, Denmark

Team
- Curling club: Hvidovre CC, Hvidovre

Curling career
- Member Association: Denmark
- World Championship: 3 (2002, 2003, 2006)
- European Championship: 5 (2002, 2003, 2004, 2005, 2017)
- Other appearances: World Mixed Championship: 1 (2016), European Mixed Championship: 5 (2007, 2008, 2009, 2010, 2013), World Junior Championships: 1 (1997)
Medal record
Curling
European Championships
Bronze medal – third place	2003 Courmayeur
European Mixed Championship
Silver medal – second place	2007 Madrid
Silver medal – second place	2009 Prague
Danish Men's Championship
Gold medal – first place	2002
Gold medal – first place	2003
Gold medal – first place	2006

Joel Ostrowski (born 5 August 1975) is a Danish curler and curling coach.

At the international level, he is a 2003 European bronze medallist and a two-time European mixed silver medallist (2007, 2009).

At the national level, he is a three-time Danish men's champion curler (2002, 2003, 2006) and a three-time Danish mixed champion curler (2008, 2009, 2012).

== Teams ==
=== Men's ===
Season	Skip	Third	Second	Lead	Alternate	Coach	Events
1996–97	Jöel Ostrowki	Kenny Tordrup	Christian Hansen	David Zeuthen	Kim Sylvest Nielsen		DJCC 1997 (gold); WJCC 1997 (5th)
2001–02	Ulrik Schmidt	Lasse Lavrsen	Carsten Svensgaard	Joel Ostrowski			DMCC 2002 (gold)
2001–02	Ulrik Schmidt	Lasse Lavrsen	Carsten Svensgaard	Bo Jensen	Joel Ostrowski	Olle Brudsten	WCC 2002 (5th)
2002–03	Ulrik Schmidt	Lasse Lavrsen	Carsten Svensgaard	Joel Ostrowski	Christian Hansen	Bill Carey, Tracy Choptain	ECC 2002 (5th); DMCC 2003 (gold); WCC 2003 (6th)
2003–04	Ulrik Schmidt	Lasse Lavrsen	Carsten Svensgaard	Joel Ostrowski	Torkil Svensgaard		ECC 2003 (bronze)
2004–05	Ulrik Schmidt	Lasse Lavrsen	Carsten Svensgaard	Joel Ostrowski	Torkil Svensgaard	Avijaja Lund Järund	ECC 2004 (6th)
2005–06	Ulrik Schmidt	Lasse Lavrsen	Carsten Svensgaard	Joel Ostrowski	Kenneth Jørgensen (ECC)	Gert Larsen (ECC), Avijaja Lund Järund (ECC); Bill Carey (WCC), Tracy Choptain (WCC)	ECC 2005 (6th); DMCC 2006 (gold); WCC 2006 (8th)
2013–14	Torkil Svensgaard	Martin Uhd Gronbech	Morten Berg Thomsen	Joel Ostrowski			DMCC 2014 (4th)
2014–15	Torkil Svensgaard	Martin Uhd Gronbech	Daniel Abrahamsen	Joel Ostrowski	Morten Berg Thomsen		
2017–18	Joel Ostrowski (fourth)	Torkil Svensgaard (skip)	Lasse Damm	Jørgen Larsen	Daniel Abrahamsen	Martin Groenbach	ECC 2017 (26th)

=== Mixed ===
Season	Skip	Third	Second	Lead	Coach	Events
2007–08	Joel Ostrowski	Camilla Jensen	Søren Jensen	Mona Sylvest Nielsen		EMxCC 2007 (silver)
2008–09	Joel Ostrowski	Camilla Jensen	Søren Jensen	Jeanne Ellegaard		EMxCC 2008 (6th)
2009–10	Joel Ostrowski	Camilla Jensen	Søren Jensen	Mona Sylvest Nielsen		EMxCC 2009 (silver)
2010–11	Joel Ostrowski	Camilla Jensen	Søren Jensen	Ane Håkansson Hansen		EMxCC 2010 (8th)
2013–14	Joel Ostrowski	Camilla Jensen	Søren Jensen	Pavla Rubasova	Halfden Skarberg	EMxCC 2013 (6th)
2016–17	Joel Ostrowski	Camilla Louise Jensen	Asmus Jørgensen	Pavia Hjorngaard		WMxCC 2016 (17th)

== Record as a coach of national teams ==
Year	Tournament, event	National team	Place
2011	2011 European Mixed Curling Championship	Hungary (mixed)	15
2018	2018 World Mixed Curling Championship	Denmark (mixed)	9
