= Carsten Svensgaard =

Danish male curler

- Curler ♂
- Born: 3 January 1975 (age 51); Holstebro, Denmark

Team
- Curling club: Hvidovre CC, Hvidovre

Curling career
- Member Association: Denmark
- World Championship: 6 (1997, 1999, 2000, 2002, 2003, 2006)
- European Championship: 8 (1997, 1999, 2000, 2001, 2002, 2003, 2004, 2005)
- Olympic: 1 (2002)
- Other appearances: World Junior Championships: 1 (1993)
Medal record
Curling
European Championships
Silver medal – second place	1997 Füssen
Silver medal – second place	1999 Chamonix
Silver medal – second place	2000 Oberstdorf
Bronze medal – third place	2003 Courmayeur
Danish Men's Championship
Gold medal – first place	1999
Gold medal – first place	2000
Gold medal – first place	2002
Gold medal – first place	2003
Gold medal – first place	2006

Carsten Svensgaard (born 3 January 1975) is a Danish curler, a three-time European silver medallist and a five-time Danish men's champion.

He participated at the 2002 Winter Olympics where the Danish men's team finished in seventh place.

== Teams ==
Season	Skip	Third	Second	Lead	Alternate	Coach	Events
1992–93	Torkil Svensgaard	Lasse Damm	Kenny Tordrup	Carsten Svensgaard	Rene Hojbjerg		DJCC 1993 (gold); WJCC 1993 (7th)
1996–97	Ulrik Schmidt	Lasse Lavrsen	Brian Hansen	Ulrik Damm	Carsten Svensgaard	Bill Carey	WCC 1997 (6th)
1997–98	Ulrik Schmidt	Lasse Lavrsen	Brian Hansen	Carsten Svensgaard		Bill Carey	ECC 1997 (silver)
1998–99	Ulrik Schmidt	Lasse Lavrsen	Brian Hansen	Carsten Svensgaard	Frants Gufler	Bill Carey	DMCC 1999 (gold); WCC 1999 (6th)
1999–00	Ulrik Schmidt	Lasse Lavrsen	Brian Hansen	Carsten Svensgaard	Bo Jensen (ECC). Frants Gufler (DMCC, WCC)	Bill Carey	ECC 1999 (silver); DMCC 2000 (gold); WCC 2000 (5th)
2000–01	Ulrik Schmidt	Lasse Lavrsen	Brian Hansen	Carsten Svensgaard	Frants Gufler	Bill Carey	ECC 2000 (silver)
2001–02	Lasse Lavrsen	Brian Hansen	Carsten Svensgaard	Frants Gufler	Ulrik Schmidt	Bill Carey	ECC 2001 (6th)
2001–02	Ulrik Schmidt	Lasse Lavrsen	Brian Hansen	Carsten Svensgaard	Frants Gufler		WOG 2002 (7th)
2001–02	Ulrik Schmidt	Lasse Lavrsen	Carsten Svensgaard	Joel Ostrowski			DMCC 2002 (gold)
2001–02	Ulrik Schmidt	Lasse Lavrsen	Carsten Svensgaard	Bo Jensen	Joel Ostrowski	Olle Brudsten	WCC 2002 (5th)
2002–03	Ulrik Schmidt	Lasse Lavrsen	Carsten Svensgaard	Joel Ostrowski	Christian Hansen	Bill Carey, Tracy Choptain	ECC 2002 (5th); DMCC 2003 (gold); WCC 2003 (6th)
2003–04	Ulrik Schmidt	Lasse Lavrsen	Carsten Svensgaard	Joel Ostrowski	Torkil Svensgaard		ECC 2003 (bronze)
2004–05	Ulrik Schmidt	Lasse Lavrsen	Carsten Svensgaard	Joel Ostrowski	Torkil Svensgaard	Avijaja Lund Järund	ECC 2004 (6th)
2005–06	Ulrik Schmidt	Lasse Lavrsen	Carsten Svensgaard	Joel Ostrowski	Kenneth Jørgensen (ECC, WCC)	Gert Larsen (ECC), Avijaja Lund Järund (ECC), Bill Carey (WCC), Tracy Choptain (WCC)	ECC 2005 (6th); DMCC 2006 (gold); WCC 2006 (8th)
2006–07	Carsten Svensgaard	Kenneth Jørgensen	Mikkel Poulsen	Dennis Hansen			
2007–08	Carsten Svensgaard	Kenneth Jørgensen	Mikkel Poulsen	Morten Berg Thomsen			
