= Kenneth Jørgensen (curler) =

Danish male curler

- Curler ♂
- Born: 7 March 1984 (age 42)

Team
- Curling club: Hvidovre CC, Hvidovre

Curling career
- Member Association: Denmark
- World Championship: 1 (2006)
- European Championship: 1 (2005)
- Other appearances: World Junior Championships: 3 (2002, 2004, 2005), European Junior Challenge: 1 (2005)
Medal record
Curling
European Junior Challenge
Gold medal – first place	2005 Copenhagen

Kenneth Jørgensen (born 7 March 1984) is a Danish curler.

At the national level, he is a two-time Danish junior champion curler (2004, 2005).

== Teams ==
Season	Skip	Third	Second	Lead	Alternate	Coach	Events
2001–02	Casper Bossen	Kenneth Daucke	Sune Frederiksen	Nicolai Frederiksen	Kenneth Jørgensen	Olle Brudsten	WJCC 2002 (7th)
2003–04	Kenneth Jørgensen	Rasmus Stjerne	Mikkel Munch Krause	Mikkel Adrup Poulsen	Dennis Hansen	Ivan Frederiksen	WJCC 2004 (10th)
2004–05	Kenneth Jørgensen	Rasmus Stjerne	Mikkel Munch Krause	Dennis Hansen	Mikkel Adrup Poulsen	Ivan Frederiksen, Gert Larsen	EJCC 2005 (gold)
2004–05	Kenneth Jørgensen	Rasmus Stjerne	Mikkel Adrup Poulsen	Dennis Hansen	Mikkel Munch Krause		WJCC 2005 (5th)
2005–06	Ulrik Schmidt	Lasse Lavrsen	Carsten Svensgaard	Joel Ostrowski	Kenneth Jørgensen	Gert Larsen (ECC), Avijaja Lund Järund (ECC), Bill Carey (WCC), Tracy Choptain (WCC)	ECC 2005 (6th); WCC 2006 (8th)
2006–07	Carsten Svensgaard	Kenneth Jørgensen	Mikkel Poulsen	Dennis Hansen			
2007–08	Carsten Svensgaard	Kenneth Jørgensen	Mikkel Poulsen	Morten Berg Thomsen			
2011–12	Torkil Svensgaard	Kenneth Jørgensen	Martin Uhd Gronbech	Daniel Abrahamsen	Morten Berg Thomsen		DMCC 2012 (???th)
