= Torger Nergård =

Norwegian curler (born 1974)

- Curler
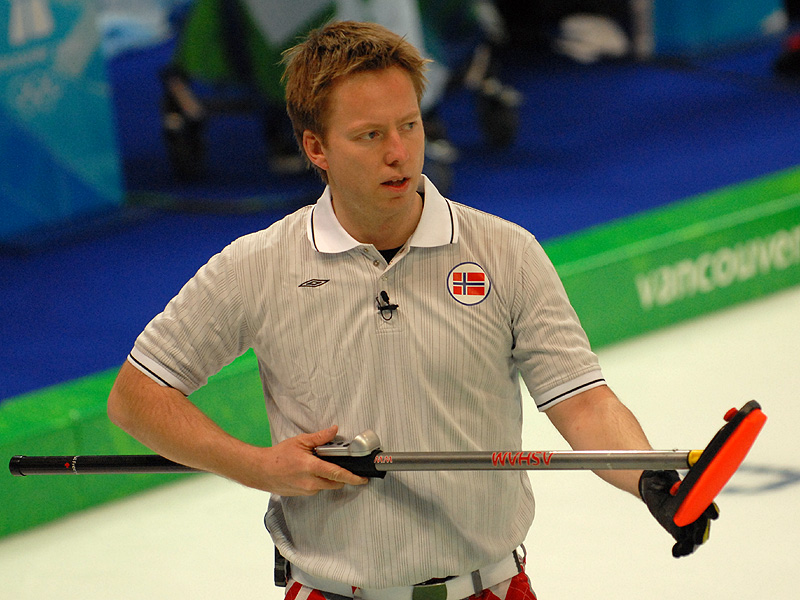
- Nergård in 2010
- Born: 12 December 1974 (age 51); Trondheim, Norway

Team
- Curling club: Snarøen CC, Oslo, NOR
- Skip: Steffen Walstad
- Third: Torger Nergård
- Second: Markus Høiberg
- Lead: Magnus Vågberg
- Alternate: Magnus Nedregotten
- Mixed doubles partner: Marianne Rørvik

Curling career
- Member Association: Norway
- World Championship: 13 (1998, 2004, 2006, 2007, 2008, 2009, 2010, 2011, 2012, 2014, 2015, 2016, 2021)
- European Championship: 19 (1997, 2000, 2001, 2002, 2003, 2005, 2006, 2007, 2008, 2009, 2010, 2011, 2012, 2013, 2014, 2015, 2016, 2017, 2021)
- Olympic: 6 (2002, 2006, 2010, 2014, 2018, 2022)
Medal record
Men's curling
Representing Norway
Winter Olympics
Gold medal – first place	2002 Salt Lake City
Silver medal – second place	2010 Vancouver
World Championships
Gold medal – first place	2014 Beijing
Silver medal – second place	2010 Cortina d'Ampezzo
Silver medal – second place	2015 Halifax
Bronze medal – third place	2006 Lowell
Bronze medal – third place	2008 Grand Forks
Bronze medal – third place	2009 Moncton
European Championships
Gold medal – first place	2005 Garmisch-Partenkirchen
Gold medal – first place	2010 Champéry
Gold medal – first place	2011 Moscow
Silver medal – second place	2007 Füssen
Silver medal – second place	2008 Örnsköldsvik
Silver medal – second place	2012 Karlstad
Silver medal – second place	2013 Stavanger
Silver medal – second place	2014 Champéry
Silver medal – second place	2016 Renfrewshire
Bronze medal – third place	2002 Grindelwald
Bronze medal – third place	2009 Aberdeen
Bronze medal – third place	2015 Esbjerg

Torger Nergård, also spelled Nergaard (born 12 December 1974) is a Norwegian curler from Oslo. He is a two-time Olympic medalist, winning a silver medal at the 2010 Winter Olympics as the third of the team skipped by Thomas Ulsrud and a gold medal at 2002 Winter Olympics as the alternate of the Norwegian team.

== Career ==
Nergård has curled professionally since 1987 and is the former third for Team Thomas Ulsrud. At the Junior level, he played third at the 1991 and 1992 World Junior Curling Championships for Thomas Due, and skipped his own team in 1996. Nergård was the alternate for Pål Trulsen's team when Norway won the gold medal at the 2002 Winter Olympics and the 2005 European Curling Championships.

With Team Ulsrud, Nergård played lead in 1997, second in 1998, and third in 2000, 2002–2003 and 2006–2010; the latter years saw the team winning six World Curling Tour events, four European Curling Championship medals (silver in 2007 and 2008; bronze in 2002 and 2009), three World Curling Championship bronze medals (2006, 2008 and 2009), and silver at the 2010 Vancouver Winter Olympics.

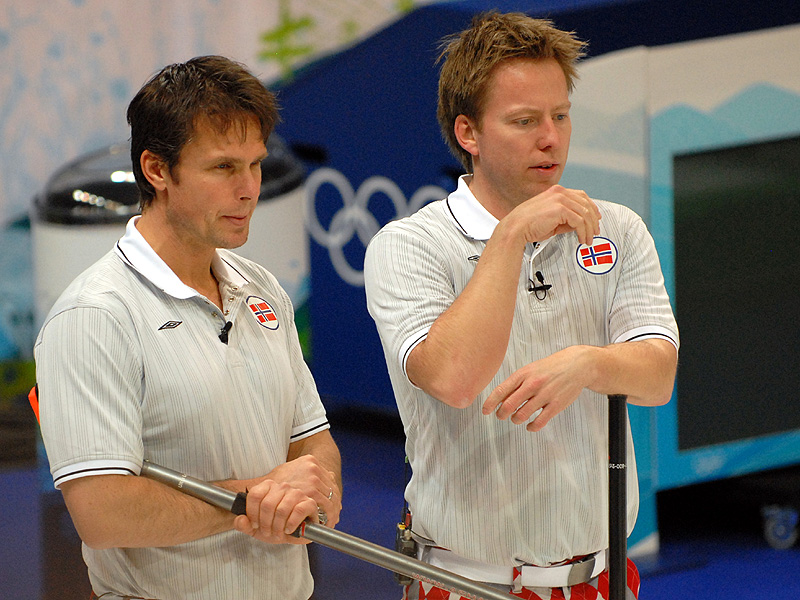
Nergård, right, with Thomas Ulsrud at the 2010 Winter Olympics

Nergård competed as skip during the 2010 World Curling Championship in Cortina d'Ampezzo, Italy, when Thomas Ulsrud had to return home for family reasons. Team Nergård won the silver medal having played some memorable matches, including a 9–8 win against Canada's Team Kevin Koe in the final round-robin game, which placed Norway first in the rankings (10–1), and a 9–7 win against Scotland's Team Warwick Smith in the semi-final. On the strength of Norway's national team during the tournament, Nergård commented that "it wasn't easy coming into the championship without Tom [Ulsrud], but I think we have shown that we can play well. We are a small nation, and there are not many curlers compared to the choice in Canada." At the closing ceremony of the championship, Nergård was honoured by his fellow competitors with the 2010 Colin Campbell Memorial Award, a recognition given to an athlete who "by deed and action in the course of their performance, best exemplified the traditional curling values of skill, honesty, fair play, friendship and sportsmanship."

Following 2010, the team would not medal again at the World Championships, but they did win back-to-back golds at the European Curling Championships in 2010 and 2011 and won silver in 2012.

== Personal life ==
Nergård is married to fellow curler Marianne Rørvik and has two children. He is employed as an engineer with Goodtech Projects and Services.

== Teams ==
Season	Skip	Third	Second	Lead	Alternate	Events
1990–91	Thomas Due	Torger Nergård	Mads Rygg	Johan Høstmælingen	Krister Aanesen	1991 WJCC
1991–92	Thomas Due	Torger Nergård	Mads Rygg	Johan Høstmælingen	Thomas Ulsrud	1992 WJCC
1995–96	Torger Nergård	Robert Kokkinn	Magnus Utgård	Jan Øivind Hewitt	Kenneth Andersen	1996 WJCC
1997–98	Thomas Ulsrud	Johan Høstmælingen	Thomas Due	Torger Nergård	Rolf Andreas Lauten	1997 ECC
1997–98	Thomas Ulsrud	Thomas Due	Torger Nergård	Johan Høstmælingen	Rolf Andreas Lauten	1998 WCC
2000–01	Thomas Ulsrud	Torger Nergård	Thomas Due	Johan Høstmælingen	Flemming Davanger	2000 ECC
2001–02	Pål Trulsen	Lars Vågberg	Flemming Davanger	Bent Ånund Ramsfjell	Torger Nergård	2001 ECC, 2002 OG
2002–03	Thomas Ulsrud	Torger Nergård	Thomas Due	Johan Høstmælingen	Thomas Løvold	2002 ECC
2003–04	Thomas Ulsrud	Torger Nergård	Thomas Due	Jan Thoresen	Thomas Løvold	2003 ECC
2003–04	Pål Trulsen	Lars Vågberg	Flemming Davanger	Bent Ånund Ramsfjell	Torger Nergård	2004 WCC
2005–06	Pål Trulsen	Lars Vågberg	Flemming Davanger	Bent Ånund Ramsfjell	Torger Nergård	2005 ECC, 2006 OG
2005–06	Thomas Ulsrud	Torger Nergård	Thomas Due	Jan Thoresen	Christoffer Svae	2006 WCC
2006–07	Thomas Ulsrud	Torger Nergård	Thomas Due	Jan Thoresen	Christoffer Svae; Petter Moe; Thomas Løvold	2006 ECC, 2007 WCC
2007–08	Thomas Ulsrud	Torger Nergård	Christoffer Svae	Håvard Vad Petersson	Thomas Due	2007 ECC, 2008 WCC
2008–09	Thomas Ulsrud	Torger Nergård	Christoffer Svae	Håvard Vad Petersson	Thomas Due; Thomas Løvold	2008 ECC, 2009 WCC
2009–10	Thomas Ulsrud	Torger Nergård	Christoffer Svae	Håvard Vad Petersson	Thomas Løvold	2009 ECC, 2010 OG
2010–11	Thomas Ulsrud	Torger Nergård	Christoffer Svae	Håvard Vad Petersson	Markus Høiberg	2010 ECC, 2011 WCC
2011–12	Thomas Ulsrud	Torger Nergård	Christoffer Svae	Håvard Vad Petersson	Markus Høiberg	2011 ECC, 2012 WCC
2012–13	Thomas Ulsrud	Torger Nergård	Christoffer Svae	Håvard Vad Petersson	Thomas Løvold; Markus Høiberg	2012 ECC, 2013 WCC
2013–14	Thomas Ulsrud	Torger Nergård	Christoffer Svae	Håvard Vad Petersson	Markus Høiberg	2013 ECC, 2014 OG, 2014 WCC
2014–15	Thomas Ulsrud	Torger Nergård	Christoffer Svae	Håvard Vad Petersson	Sander Rølvåg (ECC); Markus Høiberg (WCC)	2014 ECC, 2015 WCC
2015–16	Thomas Ulsrud	Torger Nergård	Christoffer Svae	Håvard Vad Petersson	Sander Rølvåg (ECC); Markus Høiberg (WCC)	2015 ECC, 2016 WCC
2016–17	Thomas Ulsrud	Torger Nergård	Christoffer Svae	Håvard Vad Petersson	Sander Rølvåg	2016 ECC
2017–18	Thomas Ulsrud	Torger Nergård	Christoffer Svae	Håvard Vad Petersson	Sander Rølvåg	2017 ECC
2018–19	Thomas Ulsrud	Torger Nergård	Christoffer Svae	Håvard Vad Petersson		2018 CWC/2, 2019 CWC/final
2019–20	Magnus Ramsfjell	Torger Nergård	Martin Sesaker	Bendik Ramsfjell		
2020–21	Steffen Walstad	Torger Nergård	Markus Høiberg	Magnus Vågberg	Eirik Mjøen	2021 WCC
2021–22	Steffen Walstad	Torger Nergård	Markus Høiberg	Magnus Vågberg	Magnus Nedregotten	2021 ECC, 2021 OQE
