= Jan Thoresen =

Norwegian curler and Olympic medalist

Medal record

Men's Curling

Winter Olympics
Bronze medal – third place	1998 Nagano	

World Curling Championships
Bronze medal – third place	2006 Lowell	

European Curling Championships
Bronze medal – third place	1995 Grindelwald	

World Junior Curling Championships
Bronze medal – third place	1987 Victoria	

Jan Thoresen (born 1 December 1968) is a Norwegian curler. He received a bronze medal at the 1998 Winter Olympics in Nagano.

Thoresen played juniors for Anthon Grimsmo. He won a bronze medal at the 1987 World Junior Curling Championships playing second for Grimsmo.

Thoresen would then join up with Eigil Ramsfjell playing both third and second for him. As a third on the team, he won a bronze medal at the 1995 European Curling Championships and a bronze medal at the 1998 Winter Olympics.

By 2003, Thoresen would find himself playing lead for Thomas Ulsrud. He won a bronze medal at the 2006 World Men's Curling Championship with Ulsrud, Nergaard and Due.

== Team mates up until 2007 ==
- Torger Nergård (third)
- Thomas Due (second)
- Jan Thoresen (lead)
- Christoffer Svae (alternate)
- Johan Hoestmaelingen(alternate)

== Team mates 2007 ==
- In 2007 Thomas Due and Jan Thoresen started a new team together with Tormod Andreasen and Kjell Berg. The team currently plays on the World Curling Tour Europe.
- Tormod Andreasen (skip)
- Thomas Due (third)
- Kejll Berg (second)
- Jan Thoresen (lead)
