= Christoffer Svae =

Norwegian curler and Olympic medalist

- Curler
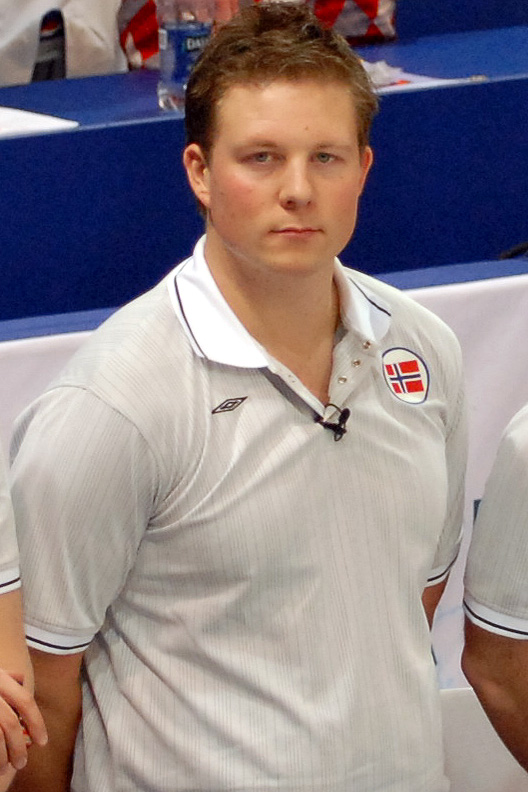
- Born: 21 March 1982 (age 44); Oslo, Norway

Curling career
- World Championship: 10 (2006, 2008, 2009, 2010, 2011, 2012, 2013, 2014, 2015, 2016)
- European Championship: 11 (2007, 2008, 2009, 2010, 2011, 2012, 2013, 2014, 2015, 2016, 2017)
- Olympic: 3 (2010, 2014, 2018)
Medal record
Curling
Representing Norway
Winter Olympics
Silver medal – second place	2010 Vancouver
World Championships
Gold medal – first place	2014 Beijing
Silver medal – second place	2010 Cortina d'Ampezzo
Silver medal – second place	2015 Halifax
Bronze medal – third place	2006 Lowell
Bronze medal – third place	2008 Grand Forks
Bronze medal – third place	2009 Moncton
European Championships
Gold medal – first place	2010 Champéry
Gold medal – first place	2011 Moscow
Silver medal – second place	2007 Füssen
Silver medal – second place	2008 Örnsköldsvik
Silver medal – second place	2012 Karlstad
Silver medal – second place	2013 Stavanger
Silver medal – second place	2014 Champéry
Silver medal – second place	2016 Renfrewshire
Bronze medal – third place	2009 Aberdeen
Bronze medal – third place	2015 Esbjerg
Universiade
Silver medal – second place	2009 Harbin

Christoffer Svae, nicknamed "Bompi" (born 21 March 1982) is a Norwegian curler from Oslo. He is best known as the former second for Team Thomas Ulsrud. With the team, he won a silver medal at 2010 Winter Olympics.

== Career ==
At Junior level, Svae played second for Team Thomas Løvold and won gold medals at the 2002 and 2003 World Junior Curling Championships "B" tournaments.

Svae formally joined Team Ulsrud in 2007 having played alternate since 2005. During the 2005–2010 seasons, Svae and his team won six World Curling Tour events, three European Curling Championship medals (silver in 2007 and 2008; bronze in 2009), four World Curling Championship medals (bronze in 2006, 2008 and 2009; silver in 2010), and silver at the 2010 Vancouver Winter Olympics.

It was Svae who selected Loudmouth Golf's colorful argyle pants (Dixie and Red & Gray) as Team Norway's uniform at the 2010 Vancouver Winter Olympics because they came close to matching the Norwegian flag colors – red, white and blue. The pants brought Team Norway unprecedented popularity as shown by the surge in sales at Loudmouth Golf as well as the number of followers at the Facebook's Norwegian Olympic Curling Team's Pants fan page exceeding over 600,000 by the end of the 2009-10 curling season.

== Personal life ==
Svae is currently employed as a curling instructor and event manager at AS Curlingbaner.

== Teams ==
Season	Skip	Third	Second	Lead	Alternate	Events
1998–99	Thomas Berntsen	Thomas Løvold	Jan Øivind Hewitt	Petter Moe	Christoffer Svae	1999 World Junior Curling Challenge (Gold), 1999 WJCC
2000–01	Thomas Løvold	Petter Moe	Fredrik Haaland	Christoffer Svae	Sindre Eirik Martinsen	2001 WJCCB
2001–02	Thomas Løvold	Petter Moe	Christoffer Svae	Håvard Vad Petersson	Christopher Berntsen	2002 WJCCB (Gold)
2001–02	Thomas Løvold	Petter Moe	Christoffer Svae	Fredrik Haaland	Christopher Berntsen	2002 WJCC
2002–03	Thomas Løvold	Petter Moe	Christoffer Svae	Håvard Vad Petersson	Bård Rieber-Mohn	2003 WJCCB (Gold)
2005–06	Thomas Ulsrud	Torger Nergård	Thomas Due	Jan Thoresen	Christoffer Svae	2006 WCC (Bronze)
2006–07	Thomas Ulsrud	Torger Nergård	Thomas Due	Jan Thoresen	Christoffer Svae	2006 Baden Masters (Bronze)
2007–08	Thomas Ulsrud	Torger Nergård	Christoffer Svae	Håvard Vad Petersson		2007 Baden Masters, 2007 Lucerne Curling Trophy (Champion)
2007–08	Thomas Ulsrud	Torger Nergård	Christoffer Svae	Håvard Vad Petersson	Thomas Due	2007 ECC (Silver), 2008 WCC (Bronze)
2008–09	Thomas Ulsrud	Torger Nergård	Christoffer Svae	Håvard Vad Petersson		2008 Baden Masters (Champion), 2008 Radisson SAS Oslo Cup (Champion)
2008–09	Thomas Ulsrud	Torger Nergård	Christoffer Svae	Håvard Vad Petersson	Thomas Due	2008 ECC (Silver)
2008–09	Thomas Ulsrud	Torger Nergård	Christoffer Svae	Håvard Vad Petersson	Thomas Løvold	2009 WCC (Bronze)
2009–10	Thomas Ulsrud	Torger Nergård	Christoffer Svae	Håvard Vad Petersson	Thomas Løvold (ECC, OG)	2009 Baden Masters (Silver), Swiss Cup Basel (Champion), Bern Open (Champion), Lucerne Curling Trophy (Champion), ECC (Bronze), 2010 OG (Silver), WCC (Silver)
2010–11	Thomas Ulsrud	Torger Nergård	Christoffer Svae	Håvard Vad Petersson	Markus Snove Hoiberg (ECC)	2010 Radisson SAS Oslo Cup (Silver), 2010 ECC (Gold)
2011–12	Thomas Ulsrud	Torger Nergård	Christoffer Svae	Håvard Vad Petersson	Markus Høiberg	2011 ECC, 2012 WCC
2012–13	Thomas Ulsrud	Torger Nergård	Christoffer Svae	Håvard Vad Petersson	Thomas Løvold; Markus Høiberg	2012 ECC, 2013 WCC
2013–14	Thomas Ulsrud	Torger Nergård	Christoffer Svae	Håvard Vad Petersson	Markus Høiberg	2013 ECC, 2014 OG, 2014 WCC
2014–15	Thomas Ulsrud	Torger Nergård	Christoffer Svae	Håvard Vad Petersson		
