= 1997 World Junior Curling Championships =

- Host city: Karuizawa, Japan
- Dates: March 22–30, 1997
- Men's winner: Switzerland
- Skip: Ralph Stöckli
- Third: Michael Bösiger
- Second: Pascal Sieber
- Lead: Clemens Oberwiler
- Alternate: Martin Zaugg
- Finalist: Finland (Perttu Piilo)
- Women's winner: Scotland
- Skip: Julia Ewart
- Third: Michelle Silvera
- Second: Mhairi Ferguson
- Lead: Lynn Cameron
- Alternate: Suzie Law
- Coach: Peter Loudon
- Finalist: Sweden (Margaretha Sigfridsson)

The 1997 Coca-Cola World Junior Curling Championships were held in Karuizawa, Japan March 22–30.

== Men's ==
Country	Skip	Wins	Losses
Canada	Ryan Keane	7	2
Finland	Perttu Piilo	7	2
Japan	Makoto Tsuruga	6	3
Switzerland	Ralph Stöckli	5	4
Denmark	Joel Ostrowski	5	4
Germany	Sebastian Stock	4	5
Scotland	Ricky Tasker	4	5
Sweden	Martin Mattsson	4	5
United States	Matt Stevens	3	6
Norway	Jan Marcus Lilledal	0	9

=== Tiebreaker ===
- Switzerland 3-2 Denmark

=== Playoffs ===
Semi-final
1	Canada	4
4	Switzerland	5
2	Finland	5
3	Japan	3

Final
4	Switzerland	5
2	Finland	3
Bronze medal
1	Canada	9
3	Japan	6

== Women's ==
Country	Skip	Wins	Losses
Sweden	Margaretha Sigfridsson	8	1
Canada	Meredith Doyle	8	1
Scotland	Julia Ewart	7	2
United States	Risa O'Connell	7	2
Japan	Akiko Katoh	5	4
Denmark	Ane Håkanson Hansen	3	6
Switzerland	Bianca Röthlisberger	3	6
Germany	Natalie Nessler	2	7
France	Nadia Bénier	2	7
Norway	Linn Githmark	0	9

=== Playoffs ===
Semi-final
1	Sweden	7
4	United States	6
2	Canada	5
3	Scotland	6

Final
1	Sweden	3
3	Scotland	11
Bronze medal
4	United States	2
2	Canada	5

== Sources ==
- Men's results from the World Curling Federation
- Women's results from the World Curling Federation
