= Toni Müller =

Swiss curler and Olympic medalist

- Curler
- Born: 10 May 1984 (age 42)

Team
- Curling club: CC Baden Regio, Baden, Switzerland
- Skip: Thomas Lips
- Third: Toni Müller (fourth)
- Second: Remo Schmid
- Lead: Simon Strübin

Curling career
- World Championship: 3 (2008, 2009, 2012)
- World Mixed Doubles Championship: 3 (2008, 2009, 2010)
- European Championship: 3 (2007, 2009, 2010)
- Olympic: 1 (2010)
Medal record
Representing Switzerland
Men's curling
Winter Olympics
Bronze medal – third place	2010 Vancouver
European Championships
Silver medal – second place	2009 Aberdeen
Silver medal – second place	2010 Champéry
World Junior Championships
Silver medal – second place	2004 Trois-Rivières
Mixed doubles curling
World Mixed Doubles Curling Championship
Gold medal – first place	2008 Vierumäki
Gold medal – first place	2009 Cortina d'Ampezzo

Toni Müller (born 10 May 1984) is a curler from Baden, Switzerland. He currently throws fourth stones for Thomas Lips.

He is mostly known for serving as the Alternate for Ralph Stöckli's team which finished fourth at the 2009 Moncton World Championships, won a silver at the 2009 Aberdeen European Championships and a bronze medal for Team Switzerland at the 2010 Vancouver Olympic Games.

Müller won gold medals at the 2008 and the 2009 World Mixed Doubles Curling Championships with his partner Irene Schori. However, they finished seventh at the 2010 World Mixed Doubles Curling Championship after being beaten by the Chinese team of Sun Yue and Zhang Zhipeng in an extra end in the quarterfinals. In an interview post-match, Schori stated that she and Müller would consider not attending next year to give a chance to other Swiss teams to compete.

Müller throws right-handed.

== Teammates ==
2009 Moncton World Championships

2009 Aberdeen European Championships

2010 Vancouver Olympic Games

Ralph Stöckli, Skip

Jan Hauser, Third

Markus Eggler, Second*

Simon Strübin, Lead

- Note: In several competitions Markus Eggler has skipped the game as a Second with Ralph Stöckli throwing fourth stones.
