= Jan Hauser =

Swiss curler

Medal record

Curling

Representing Switzerland

Winter Olympics
Bronze medal – third place	2010 Vancouver	

European Curling Championships
Silver medal – second place	2009 Aberdeen	

World Junior Championships
Bronze medal – third place	2003 Flims	

Jan Hauser (born 19 January 1985 in Glarus) is a Swiss curler from Zürich. Playing third for Ralph Stöckli, he won the bronze medal at 2010 Winter Olympics.

Hauser was a fairly successful junior curler. In his third World Junior Curling Championships, in 2003, he skipped Switzerland to a bronze medal finish.

In 2007, he joined forces with Stöckli, as his third. At his first World Championship in 2007, the team finished fourth. He returned to the World Championships with Stöckli in 2009.

== Teammates ==
2010 Vancouver Olympic Games

Ralph Stöckli, Skip

Markus Eggler, Second

Simon Strübin, Lead

Toni Müller, Alternate
