= 2005 European Curling Championships =

International curling competition

Coordinates: 47°30′N 11°05′E

The 2005 European Curling Championships were held in Garmisch-Partenkirchen, Germany from December 9 to 17.

== Men's ==
=== A tournament ===
==== Final round robin standings ====
Country	Skip	W	L
Scotland	David Murdoch	8	1
Sweden	Peja Lindholm	8	1
Switzerland	Ralph Stöckli	6	3
Norway	Pål Trulsen	5	4
Germany	Andy Kapp	5	4
Denmark	Ulrik Schmidt	4	5
Ireland	Douglas Dryburgh	4	5
Finland	Markku Uusipaavalniemi	3	6
Italy	Joel Retornaz	1	8
Russia	Alexander Kirikov	1	8

==== Tie breaker ====
December 15th, 20:00

Sheet E	1	2	3	4	5	6	7	8	9	10	Final
Germany (Kapp) 🔨	0	1	0	2	0	2	0	2	0	0	7
Norway (Trulsen)	0	0	2	0	2	0	2	0	1	1	8

==== Playoffs ====
Semi-final
1	Scotland	4
4	Norway	7
2	Sweden	8
3	Switzerland	5

Final
4	Norway	9
2	Sweden	4
Bronze medal
1	Scotland	7
3	Switzerland	5

==== Semifinals ====
December 16th, 16:00

Sheet B	1	2	3	4	5	6	7	8	9	10	Final
Norway (Trulsen) 🔨	0	2	0	0	0	3	0	1	1	0	7
Scotland (Murdoch)	0	0	1	1	0	0	2	0	0	0	4

Sheet D	1	2	3	4	5	6	7	8	9	10	Final
Sweden (Lindholm) 🔨	2	0	1	0	2	0	2	0	0	1	8
Switzerland (Stöckli)	0	1	0	2	0	1	0	0	1	0	5

==== Bronze-medal game ====
December 17th, 14:00

Sheet B	1	2	3	4	5	6	7	8	9	10	Final
Scotland (Murdoch) 🔨	2	0	0	2	0	0	1	0	2	0	7
Switzerland (Stöckli)	0	1	0	0	0	1	0	2	0	1	5

==== Gold-medal game ====
December 17th, 14:00

Sheet C	1	2	3	4	5	6	7	8	9	10	Final
Norway (Trulsen) 🔨	1	0	2	2	0	1	1	0	2	X	9
Sweden (Lindholm)	0	2	0	0	1	0	0	1	0	X	4

=== B tournament ===
==== Group A Final round robin standings ====
Country	Skip	W	L
Wales	Adrian Meikle	8	1
England	Bruce Bowyer	8	1
Belgium	Pieter-Jan Witzig	7	2
Spain	Antonio De Mollinedo Gonzalez	6	3
Austria	Alois Kreidl	5	4
Poland	Maciej Cesarz	4	5
Bulgaria	Nikolay Runtov	3	6
Greece	Nikolaos Zacharias	3	6
Belarus	Oleksii Voloshenko	1	8
Kazakhstan	Vladislav Kogay	0	9

==== Group B Final round robin standings ====
Country	Skip	W	L
France	Thomas Dufour	7	1
Czech Republic	David Sik	6	2
Estonia	Martin Lill	6	2
Hungary	György Nagy	5	3
Netherlands	Reg Wiebe	4	4
Latvia	Ritvars Gulbis	4	4
Slovakia	Pavol Pitonak	3	5
Andorra	Enric Morral	1	7
Croatia	Alen Cadez	0	8

==== Playoffs ====
Semi-final
A1	Wales	4
B2	Czech Republic	3
B1	France	6
A2	England	3

Final
A1	Wales	1
B1	France	8
Bronze medal
A2	England	4
B2	Czech Republic	9

=== Challenge series ===
(Best of Three. Winner gets a berth in the 2006 World Men's Curling Championship along with the top 7 A-tournament teams)

- Finland 7–2 France
- France 10–5 Finland
- Finland 6–5 France

== Women's ==
=== A tournament ===
==== Final round robin standings ====
Country	Skip	W	L
Sweden	Anette Norberg	9	0
Switzerland	Mirjam Ott	8	1
Norway	Dordi Nordby	7	2
Denmark	Dorthe Holm	5	4
Scotland	Rhona Martin	5	4
Italy	Diana Gaspari	5	4
Netherlands	Shari Leibbrandt-Demmon	3	6
Russia	Ludmila Privivkova	2	7
Austria	Claudia Toth	1	8
Finland	Päivi Salonen	0	9

==== Tie breakers ====
December 15th, 12:00

Sheet C	1	2	3	4	5	6	7	8	9	10	Final
Italy (Gaspari) 🔨	0	0	0	2	0	1	0	X	X	X	3
Scotland (Martin)	2	1	2	0	2	0	3	X	X	X	10

December 15th, 20:00

Sheet A	1	2	3	4	5	6	7	8	9	10	Final
Denmark (Holm) 🔨	2	2	0	2	0	0	0	1	0	1	8
Scotland (Martin)	0	0	1	0	2	0	1	0	3	0	7

==== Playoffs ====
Semi-final
1	Sweden	6
4	Denmark	4
2	Switzerland	8
3	Norway	6

Final
1	Sweden	8
2	Switzerland	5
Bronze medal
3	Norway	2
4	Denmark	10

==== Semifinals ====
December 16th, 12:00

Sheet B	1	2	3	4	5	6	7	8	9	10	Final
Sweden (Norberg) 🔨	0	1	0	1	0	3	0	1	0	0	6
Denmark (Holm)	0	0	1	0	1	0	1	0	1	0	4

Sheet D	1	2	3	4	5	6	7	8	9	10	Final
Norway (Nordby)	1	0	1	0	2	0	0	1	0	1	6
Switzerland (Ott) 🔨	0	3	0	2	0	0	2	0	1	0	8

==== Bronze-medal game ====
December 17th, 9:00

Sheet B	1	2	3	4	5	6	7	8	9	10	Final
Norway (Nordby)	0	1	0	0	0	0	1	0	X	X	2
Denmark (Holm) 🔨	1	0	1	1	3	3	0	1	X	X	10

==== Gold-medal game ====
December 17th, 9:00

Sheet C	1	2	3	4	5	6	7	8	9	10	Final
Switzerland (Ott)	0	2	0	0	2	0	0	1	0	0	5
Sweden (Norberg) 🔨	1	0	1	1	0	1	1	0	2	1	8

=== B tournament ===
==== Group A Final round robin standings ====
Country	Skip	W	L
Germany	Andrea Schöpp	6	0
England	Joan Reed	5	1
France	Sandrine Morand	4	2
Ireland	Fiona Turnbull	3	3
Estonia	Maile Mölder	2	4
Kazakhstan	Yekaterina Gorkusha	1	5
Bulgaria	Borislava Petrova	0	6

==== Group B Final round robin standings ====
Country	Skip	W	L
Czech Republic	Hana Synáčková	6	0
Latvia	Iveta Staša	5	1
Hungary	Ildikó Szekeres	4	2
Spain	Ellen Kittelsen	3	3
Croatia	Katarina Radonic	2	4
Poland	Krystyna Beniger	1	5
Slovakia	Katarina Langova	0	6

==== Playoffs ====
Semi-final
A1	Germany	8
B2	Latvia	4
B1	Czech Republic	12
A2	England	5

Final
A1	Germany	6
B1	Czech Republic	4
Bronze medal
A2	England	10
B2	Latvia	7

=== Challenge series ===
(Best of Three. Winner gets a berth in the 2006 Ford World Women's Curling Championship along with the top 7 A-tournament teams)

- Germany 6–5 Russia
- Germany 8–2 Russia
