= Ralph Stöckli =

Swiss curler and Olympic medalist

- Curler ♂
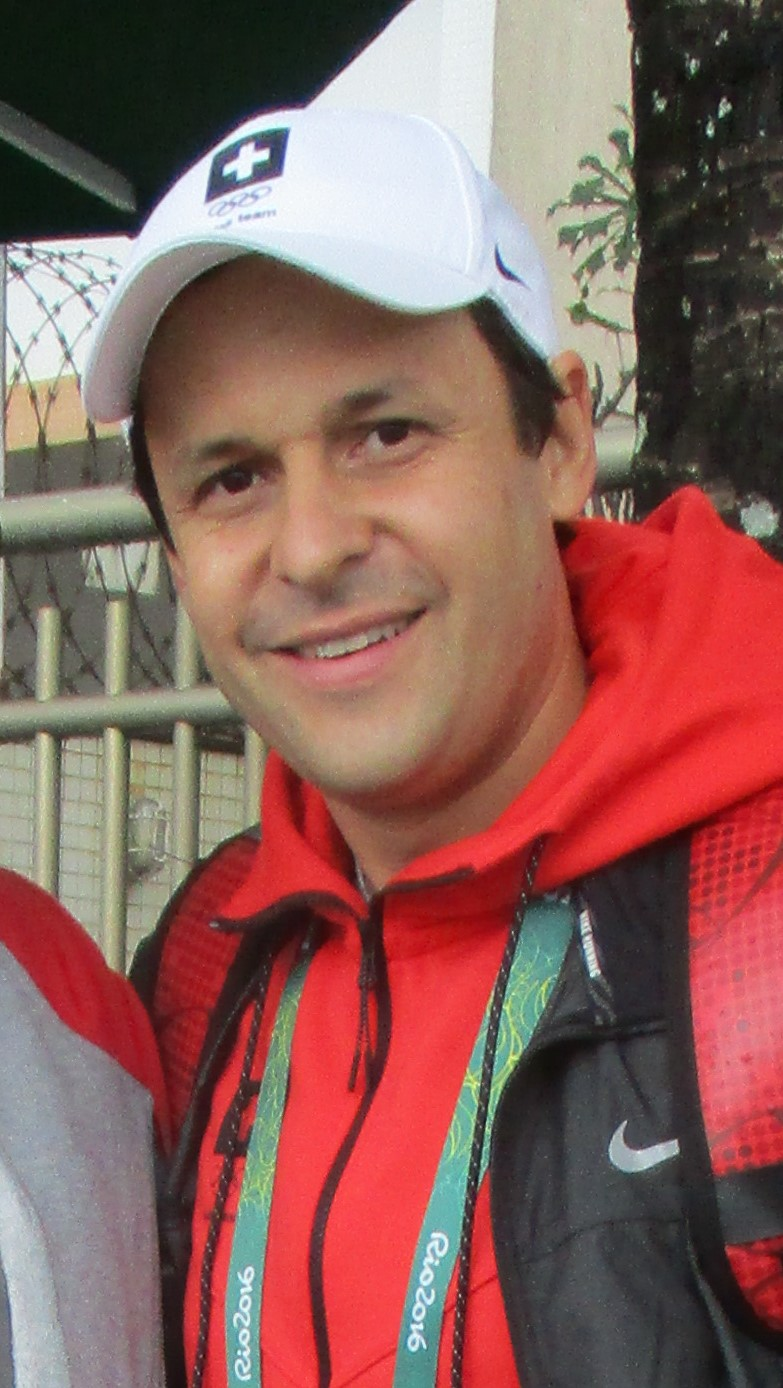
- Ralph Stöckli in 2016.
- Born: 23 July 1976 (age 50); Uzwil, Switzerland

Team
- Curling club: Basel-Regio CC, Basel

Curling career
- World Championship: 4 (2003, 2006, 2007, 2009)
- European Championship: 5 (2002, 2005, 2006, 2007, 2009)
Medal record
Men's curling
Representing Switzerland
Winter Olympics
Bronze medal – third place	2010 Vancouver
World Championships
Silver medal – second place	2003 Winnipeg
European Championships
Gold medal – first place	2006 Basel
Silver medal – second place	2009 Aberdeen
World Junior Championships
Gold medal – first place	1997 Karuizawa
Silver medal – second place	1996 Red Deer
Bronze medal – third place	1994 Sofia
Bronze medal – third place	1998 Thunder Bay

Ralph Stöckli (born 23 July 1976 in Uzwil) is a Swiss curler from Lucerne. He won a bronze medal at 2010 Winter Olympics.

Stöckli began a successful curling career at the junior level, winning a bronze medal at the World Junior Curling Championships as an alternate in 1994. In 1996, he was the Swiss skip and they won a silver medal, losing to James Dryburgh of Scotland. In 1997 Stöckli won the gold medal defeating Perttu Piilo of Finland in the final. Stöckli ended his junior career with a bronze in 1998.

After a 7th-place finish at the 2002 Ford World Curling Championship, Stöckli won a silver at the 2003 Ford World Curling Championship- losing to Canada's Randy Ferbey in the final.

Stöckli was the skip of the Swiss team at the 2006 Winter Olympics in Turin, Italy. The team finished just out of medal contention with a 5-4 record.

Stöckli was vice on the Swiss team (skipped by Andreas Schwaller) that won the 2006 European Curling Championship.

Stöckli announced his retirement from curling in 2010.

After retirement, Stöckli works for Swiss Olympic Association. He is the Chef de Mission of the Swiss Olympic Team for 2016, 2018, 2020, 2022, 2024 and 2026 Olympics.

== Teammates ==
2006 Torino Olympic Games

Claudio Pescia, Third

Pascal Sieber, Second

Marco Battilana, Lead

Simon Strübin, Alternate

2009 Moncton World Championships

2009 Aberdeen European Championships

2010 Vancouver Olympic Games

Jan Hauser, Third

Markus Eggler, Second (Note: In several competitions, Eggler has skipped the game, throwing second stones, with Stöckli throwing fourth stones.)

Simon Strübin, Lead

Toni Müller, Alternate
