= Claudio Pescia =

Swiss curler (born 1963)

- Curler
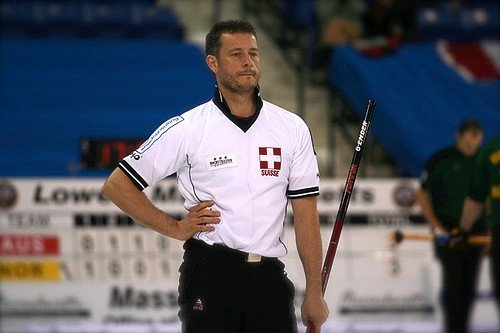
- Born: 17 November 1963 (age 62); Zurich, Switzerland

Team
- Curling club: CC St. Galler Bär, St. Gallen, Switzerland
- Skip: Claudio Pescia
- Third: Sven Iten
- Second: Reto Seiler
- Lead: Rainer Kobler
- Alternate: Kevin Pescia

Curling career
- World Championship: 4 (1996, 2003, 2006, 2008)
- European Championship: 7 (1994, 1995, 1996, 1997, 1998, 2002, 2005)
Medal record
Curling
World Championships
Silver medal – second place	2003 Winnipeg

Claudio Pescia (born 17 November 1963 in Zurich) is a Swiss curler from Unterägeri. Originally the skip of the Italian national team, Pescia now skips under the Swiss flag.

From 1994 to 1998, Pescia skipped the Italian team in five European Curling Championships, finishing in fourth place in 1995. During that time period, he also skipped the Italian team at the 1996 Ford World Curling Championships, where Italy finished in eighth.

Pescia then moved to Switzerland, to play third for Ralph Stöckli. He played at the 2002 and 2005 European Championships with him, the 2003 and 2006 World Championships and the 2006 Winter Olympics. Pescia won a silver medal at the 2003 Ford World Men's Curling Championship.

== Personal life ==
Pescia has three children and is employed as a wealth manager.
