= Simon Strübin =

Swiss curler (born 1979)

- Curler
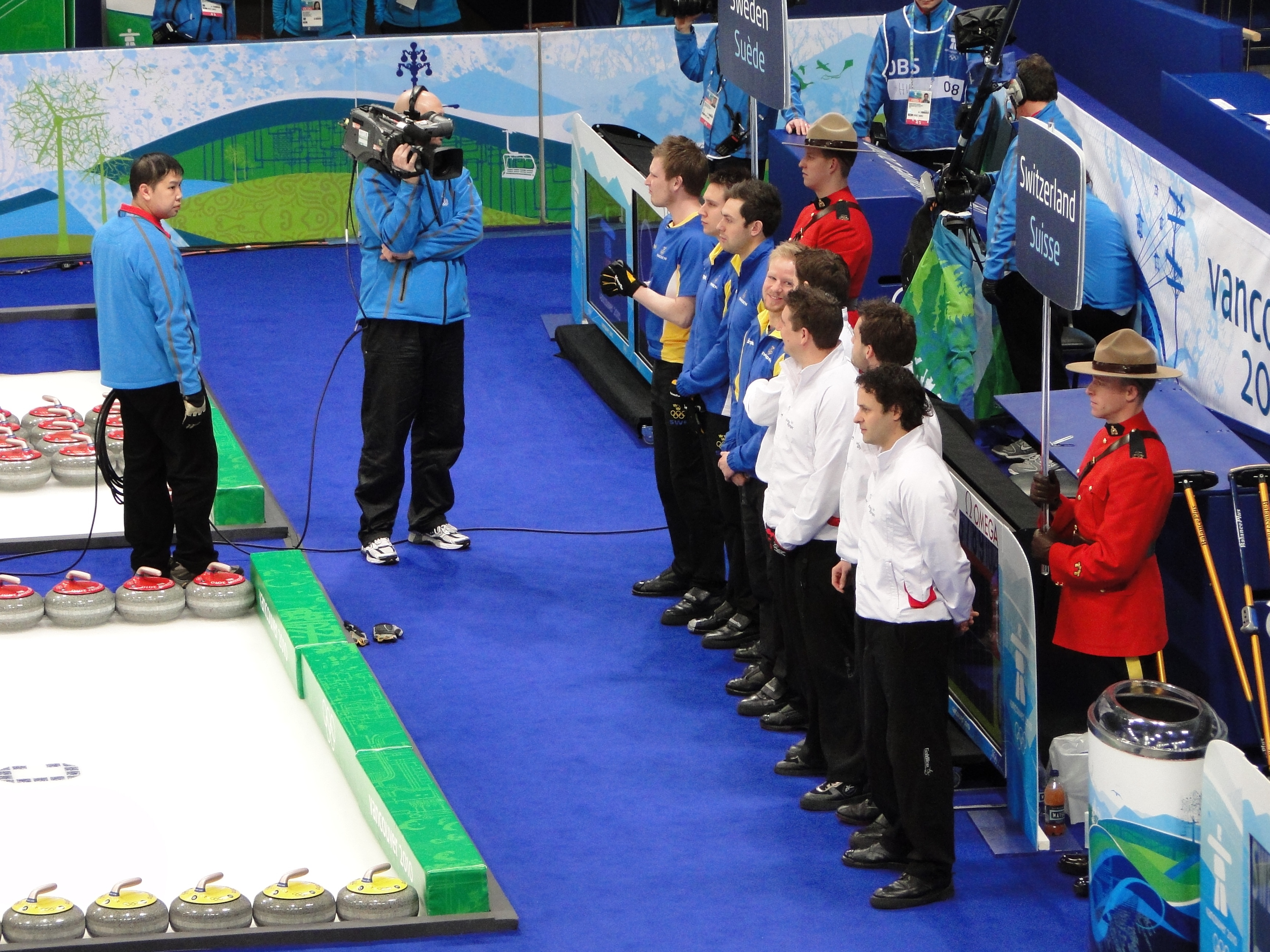
- Born: 21 March 1979 (age 47); Zürich, Switzerland

Curling career
- World Championship: 4 (2003, 2006, 2007, 2009)
- European Championship: 2 (2005, 2009)
- Olympic: 2 (2006, 2010)
Medal record
Men's curling
Representing Switzerland
Winter Olympics
Bronze medal – third place	2010 Vancouver	Men's
World Curling Championships
Silver medal – second place	2003 Winnipeg	Men's
European Curling Championships
Silver medal – second place	2009 Aberdeen	Men's
World Junior Curling Championships
Bronze medal – third place	1998 Thunder Bay	Men's

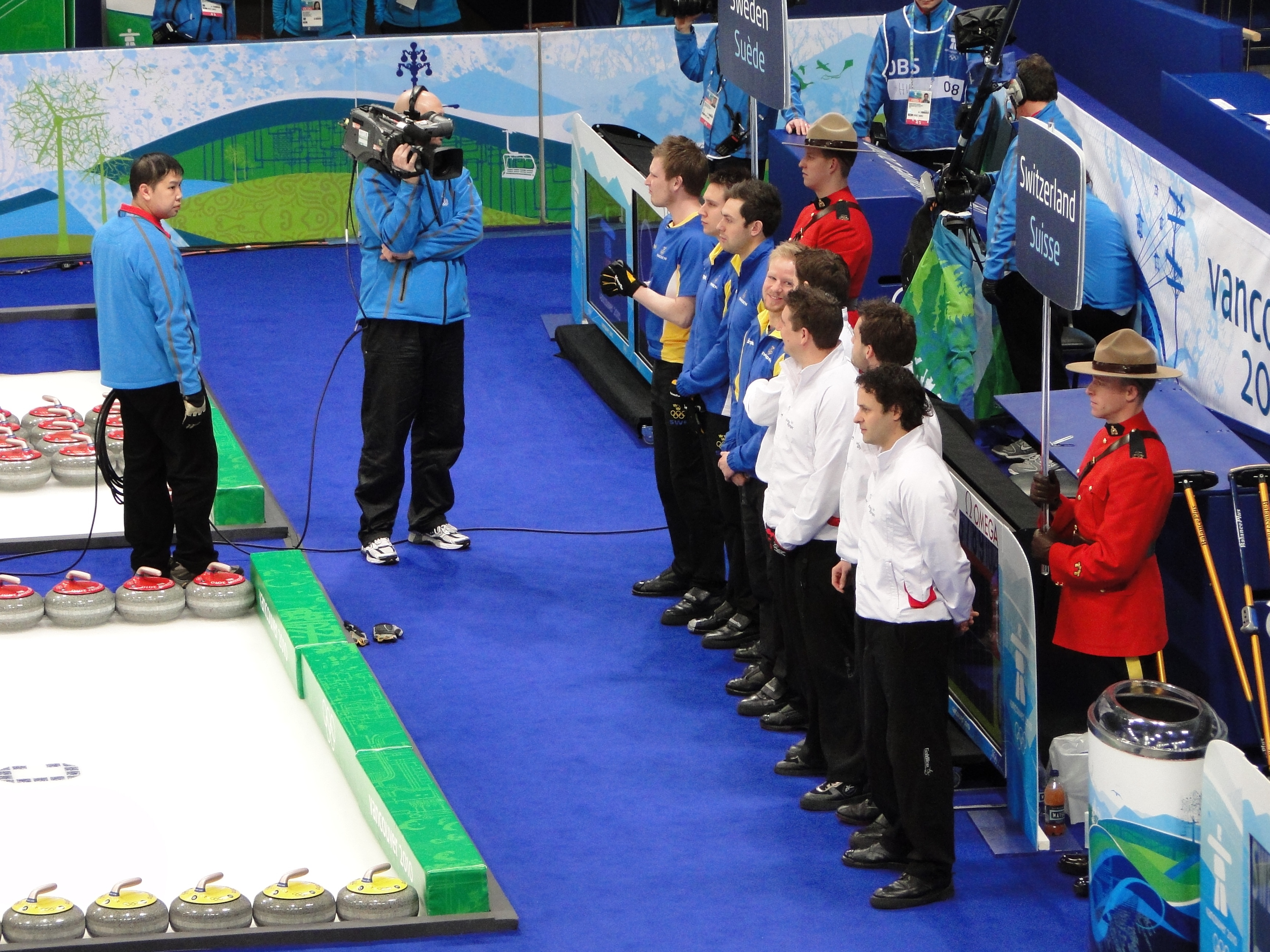
Men's Curling during the 2010 Winter Olympics, Bronze medal final between Sweden and Switzerland.

Simon Strübin (born 21 March 1979 in Zürich) is a Swiss curler from Erlenbach. He played lead in Switzerland men's team skipped by Ralph Stöckli on 2010 Winter Olympic Games.

Strübin played second for Stöckli at the 1998 World Junior Curling Championships where they picked up a bronze medal. In 2003, he moved to lead on the team where they won the silver medal at the 2003 Ford World Men's Curling Championship. He then was the team's alternate for the 2005 European Curling Championships and 2006 Winter Olympics before becoming lead again for the 2006 and 2007 World Championships.

== Teammates ==
2010 Vancouver Olympic Games

Ralph Stöckli, Skip

Jan Hauser, Third

Markus Eggler, Second

Toni Müller, Alternate
