= Curling at the 2010 Winter Olympics – Statistics =

This is a statistical synopsis of event of Curling at the 2010 Winter Olympics.

6 of the 80 curlers at the 1998 Nagano Olympics are competing in Vancouver (plus a seventh who serves as a coach).

12 of the 100 curlers at the 2002 Salt Lake City Olympics are in Vancouver.

22 of the 100 curlers at the 2006 Turin Olympics are back in Vancouver.

== Percentages ==
In curling, each player is graded on their shots on a scale of zero to four. Their cumulative point total is then marked as a percentage out of the total points possible. This score is just for statistical purposes, and has nothing to do with the outcome of the game.

=== Men's tournament ===
Percentages by draw.

==== Leads ====
#	Curler	1	2	3	4	5	6	7	8	9	10	11	12	Total
*	(United Kingdom) Graeme Connal	*	*	*	*	*	*	*	*	*	*	100	*	*
1	(Canada) Ben Hebert	92	78	*	72	100	94	*	80	94	84	*	89	87
1	(Norway) Håvard Vad Petersson	100	76	*	89	81	78	81	*	88	95	*	93	87
1	(United Kingdom) Euan Byers	91	*	85	84	81	*	85	78	94	*	83	98	87
4	(Denmark) Lars Vilandt	88	*	100	63	78	*	86	*	88	*	93	89	86
*	(United States) Chris Plys	*	*	*	*	*	*	*	*	85	*	*	*	*
5	(Switzerland) Simon Strübin	89	*	75	79	84	91	*	85	75	81	*	91	83
6	(Sweden) Viktor Kjäll	80	*	76	96	85	*	86	86	81	83	*	66	82
7	(China) Zang Jialiang	*	79	75	*	80	86	85	93	*	59	85	91	81
*	(Canada) Adam Enright	*	*	*	*	81	*	*	*	*	*	*	*	*
8	(United States) John Benton	89	73	85	82	*	69	80	*	*	85	*	*	80
*	(Germany) Holger Höhne^{1}	*	*	*	*	*	76	*	*	86	*	78	*	*
9	(France) Richard Ducroz	*	76	88	*	75	86	75	80	*	64	*	83	78
10	(Germany) Andreas Kempf	76	83	73	86	*	*	72	*	*	64	*	*	76
*	(Denmark) Mikkel Poulsen	*	*	*	*	*	71	*	*	*	*	*	*	*
*	(France) Raphael Mathieu	*	*	*	*	*	*	*	*	*	*	86	25	*

^{1} Normally throws second

==== Seconds ====
#	Curler	1	2	3	4	5	6	7	8	9	10	11	12	Total
1	(Norway) Christoffer Svae	82	83	*	89	88	84	83	*	89	83	*	80	85
2	(Switzerland) Markus Eggler	81	*	74	81	86	89	*	89	74	88	*	96	84
2	(Canada) Marc Kennedy	91	71	*	94	86	83	*	71	85	89	*	88	84
2	(Sweden) Fredrik Lindberg	94	*	90	76	78	*	77	88	94	65	*	95	84
*	(Denmark) Mikkel Poulsen	*	*	*	*	88	*	*	*	79	*	81	*	*
5	(Germany) Holger Höhne	91	69	71	78	*	*	*	*	*	*	*	*	78^{2}
5	(China) Xu Xiaoming	*	81	86	*	89	69	81	76	*	74	*	*	78^{3}
5	(Denmark) Bo Jensen	90	*	84	70	*	77	75	*	*	*	*	71	78
8	(United Kingdom) Peter Smith	66	*	85	69	76	*	86	71	85	*	77	75	77
9	(United States) Jeff Isaacson	68	75	73	81	*	86	84	*	74	75	*	*	76^{3}
*	(United States) Chris Plys	*	*	*	*	*	*	*	*	*	*	75	*	*
10	(France) Jan Ducroz	*	88	75	*	69	80	63	*	*	63	82	72	74
*	(Germany) Andreas Lang^{1}	*	*	*	*	*	*	64	*	88	61	75	*	*
*	(China) Li Hong Chen	*	*	*	*	*	*	*	*	*	*	68	75	*
*	(Germany) Daniel Herberg	*	*	*	*	*	71	*	*	*	*	*	*	*
*	(France) Raphael Mathieu	*	*	*	*	*	*	*	70	*	30	*	*	*

^{1}Normally throws third rocks
^{2}Includes percentages from playing lead
^{3}Includes percentages from playing third

==== Thirds ====
#	Curler	1	2	3	4	5	6	7	8	9	10	11	12	Total
1	(Canada) John Morris	90	71	*	92	75	88	*	81	90	75	*	86	83
2	(Sweden) Sebastian Kraupp	83	*	83	75	86	*	69	85	90	83	*	88	82
2	(Switzerland) Jan Hauser	83	*	74	85	84	79	*	89	76	86	*	82	82
4	(United Kingdom) Ewan MacDonald	70	*	82	91	80	*	85	64	85	*	83	78	80
5	(Norway) Torger Nergård	73	76	*	79	64	79	89	*	91	88	*	73	79
6	(United States) Jason Smith	81	77	74	74	*	*	*	*	*	*	*	*	77^{3}
7	(China) Wang Fengchun	*	83	86	*	81	71	79	57	*	76	*	*	76
7	(Denmark) Ulrik Schmidt	85	*	57	65	71	73	89	*	88	*	77	80	76
*	(United States) John Shuster^{1}	*	*	*	*	*	*	82	*	70	67	*	*	*
*	(China) Xu Xiao Ming^{2}	*	*	*	*	*	*	*	*	*	*	79	68	*
*	(Germany) Daniel Herberg	*	*	*	*	*	*	72	*	63	83	*	*	*
9	(France) Tony Angiboust	*	71	83	*	73	65	67	80	*	61	76	65	71
9	(Germany) Andreas Lang	71	79	69	76	*	58	*	*	*	*	*	*	71^{4}
*	(United States) Chris Plys	*	*	*	*	*	66	*	*	*	*	*	*	*
*	(United States) Jeff Isaacson ^{2}	*	*	*	*	*	*	*	*	*	*	65	*	*

^{1} Normally throws last rocks
^{2} Normally throws second rocks
^{3} Includes games played as fourth
^{4} Includes games played as second

==== Skips ====
#	Curler	1	2	3	4	5	6	7	8	9	10	11	12	Total
1	(Norway) Thomas Ulsrud	80	77	*	87	84	90	97	*	90	86	*	91	87
2	(Canada) Kevin Martin	93	89	*	72	70	98	*	87	94	79	*	86	85
3	(United Kingdom) David Murdoch	66	*	84	78	86	*	86	74	85	*	94	70	80
3	(Sweden) Niklas Edin	88	*	80	67	80	*	83	83	89	69	*	78	80
5	(Switzerland) Ralph Stöckli	85	*	72	69	64	65	*	85	85	94	*	94	79
*	(United States) Jason Smith ^{1}	*	*	*	*	*	85	81	*	75	69	*	*	*
6	(Germany) Andy Kapp	76	69	82	80	*	79	81	*	72	79	69	*	76
7	(China) Liu Rui	*	84	55	*	85	75	71	82	*	68	66	68	73
8	(France) Thomas Dufour	*	83	64	*	73	85	53	79	*	70	71	68	72
9	(Denmark) Johnny Frederiksen	78	*	31	70	84	58	78	*	89	*	68	76	70
9	(United States) John Shuster	72	72	67	69	*	*	*	*	*	*	58	*	70^{2}

^{1} Normally throws third
^{2} Includes games played as third

==== Team totals ====
#	Country	1	2	3	4	5	6	7	8	9	10	11	12	Total
1	Canada	91	77	*	83	80	90	*	80	91	82	*	87	85
2	Norway	84	78	*	86	79	83	88	*	89	88	*	84	84
3	Switzerland	84	*	74	79	79	81	*	87	78	87	*	91	82
3	Sweden	86	*	82	78	82	*	79	85	88	75	*	82	82
5	(United Kingdom) Great Britain	73	*	84	80	81	*	86	72	87	*	85	80	81
6	Denmark	85	*	69	67	80	70	82	*	86	*	80	79	78
7	China	*	82	75	*	84	75	79	77	*	69	75	75	77
8	United States	78	74	75	76	*	77	82	*	76	74	69	*	76
9	Germany	79	75	73	80	*	71	72	*	77	72	71	*	74
10	France	*	79	77	*	73	79	64	77	*	59	79	67	73

=== Women's tournament ===
Percentages by draw.

==== Leads ====
#	Curler	1	2	3	4	5	6	7	8	9	10	11	12	Total
1	(Russia) Ekaterina Galkina	88	*	81	81	81	85	88	86	*	84	*	84	84
2	(United States) Natalie Nicholson	79	94	*	86	86	*	83	80	88	*	84	61	82
2	(Japan) Kotomi Ishizaki	71	85	*	88	*	88	*	75	80	67	94	86	82
4	(Sweden) Anna Le Moine	87	75	73	*	*	70	95	*	83	88	78	83	81
5	(Denmark) Camilla Jensen	79	*	86	83	79	74	73	80	*	79	*	81	79
6	(Switzerland) Janine Greiner	85	75	81	*	*	64	80	68	*	80	87	79	78
6	(United Kingdom) Lorna Vevers	*	69	84	72	74	69	81	94	*	73	83	*	78
6	(Canada) Cori Bartel	66	83	*	70	*	83	*	86	74	77	71	88	78
*	(Germany) Corinna Scholz	*	79	*	*	76	*	*	*	80	*	*	76	*
9	(China) Zhou Yan	*	75	66	74	73	86	69	*	69	91	83	*	76
9	(Germany) Stella Heiß	73	*	*	89	*	*	61	78	*	*	80	*	76
*	(Japan) Mayo Yamaura	*	*	*	*	*	*	*	50	*	*	*	*	*
*	(United Kingdom) Anne Laird	*	*	*	*	50	*	*	*	*	*	*	*	*

==== Seconds ====
#	Curler	1	2	3	4	5	6	7	8	9	10	11	12	Total
*	(Switzerland) Irene Schori	*	*	*	*	*	*	*	*	*	*	*	84	*
1	(Canada) Carolyn Darbyshire	74	89	*	84	*	76	*	80	73	82	88	83	81
2	(Sweden) Cathrine Lindahl	71	78	79	*	*	81	70	*	92	69	84	84	79
3	(United States) Nicole Joraanstad	70	76	*	84	83	*	82	77	71	*	85	77	78
4	(Japan) Mari Motohashi	81	86	*	71	*	83	*	73	*	*	*	*	77^{2}
5	(Germany) Monika Wagner	84	76	*	81	75	*	77	69	73	*	70	71	75
*	(Russia) Margarita Fomina	*	*	*	63	84	78	73	*	*	*	*	*	*
6	(Denmark) Angelina Jensen	79	*	69	65	67	78	76	81	*	71	*	81	74
7	(United Kingdom) Kelly Wood	*	81	50	69	74	69	89	74	*	76	77	*	73
7	(Switzerland) Carmen Küng	75	76	81	*	*	71	64	63	*	83	70	*	73
9	(China) Yue Qingshuang	*	68	74	75	56	88	64	*	75	63	76	*	71
*	(Japan) Anna Ohmiya ^{1}	*	*	*	*	*	*	*	*	78	61	*	*	*
10	(Russia) Nkeiruka Ezekh	74	*	75	46	*	*	*	74	*	68	*	79	69
*	(Japan) Mayo Yamaura	*	*	*	*	*	*	*	*	*	*	65	70	*

^{1} Normally throws third
^{2}Includes games played third

==== Thirds ====
#	Curler	1	2	3	4	5	6	7	8	9	10	11	12	Total
1	(Canada) Susan O'Connor	88	75	*	85	*	84	*	88	81	89	85	85	84
2	(Russia) Anna Sidorova	86	*	81	70	*	*	89	85	*	*	*	*	77^{3}
3	(Sweden) Eva Lund	86	64	84	*	*	64	63	*	86	72	68	93	76
*	(United States) Debbie McCormick^{1}	*	*	*	*	*	*	*	*	89	*	64	75	*
4	(Germany) Melanie Robillard	74	61	*	70	65	*	81	74	89	*	81	81	75
4	(China) Liu Yin	*	80	66	63	85	68	80	*	81	73	75	*	75
6	(United Kingdom) Jackie Lockhart	*	74	68	66	83	64	83	60	*	79	85	*	74
*	(Japan) Mari Motohashi^{2}	*	*	*	*	*	*	*	*	83	69	75	69	*
*	(Russia) Margarita Fomina	*	*	*	*	*	*	*	*	*	59	*	89	*
7	(Switzerland) Carmen Schäfer	81	73	63	*	*	73	65	71	*	88	73	71	73
*	(Russia) Liudmila Privivkova^{1}	*	*	*	*	76	70	*	*	*	*	*	*	*
8	(United States) Allison Pottinger	74	66	*	69	78	*	85	79	*	*	*	*	72^{3}
9	(Denmark) Denise Dupont	81	*	59	60	50	86	66	81	*	68	*	75	70
10	(Japan) Anna Ohmiya	84	70	*	45	*	71	*	57	*	*	*	*	67 ^{4}

^{1} Normally throws last rocks
^{2} Normally throws second rocks
^{3} Includes games played as fourth
^{4} Includes games played as second

==== Fourth ====
#	Curler	1	2	3	4	5	6	7	8	9	10	11	12	Total
1	(Canada) Cheryl Bernard	80	75	*	71	*	81	*	89	68	93	89	93	82
2	(Sweden) Anette Norberg	78	80	84	*	*	86	58	*	85	69	89	91	80
3	(Switzerland) Mirjam Ott	83	77	69	*	*	76	74	79	*	94	78	77	79
4	(United Kingdom) Eve Muirhead	*	73	81	75	92	83	68	79	*	65	69	*	76
5	(China) Wang Bingyu	*	77	76	71	92	74	71	*	81	55	65	*	74
6	(Russia) Liudmila Privivkova	83	*	79	39	*	*	95	70	*	*	*	*	73^{2}
6	(United States) Debbie McCormick	58	82	*	66	83	*	78	58	*	*	*	*	73^{2}
8	(Germany) Andrea Schöpp	85	75	*	66	83	*	60	81	75	*	54	73	72
*	(Russia) Anna Sidorova^{1}	*	*	*	*	71	55	*	*	*	81	*	78	*
9	(Japan) Moe Meguro	63	54	*	69	*	85	*	72	78	63	76	75	71
10	(Denmark) Madeleine Dupont	75	*	55	66	46	79	69	74	*	80	*	82	70
*	(United States) Allison Pottinger ^{1}	*	*	*	*	*	*	*	*	85	*	61	52	*

^{1} Normally throws third rocks ^{2} Includes games played as third

==== Team totals ====
#	Country	1	2	3	4	5	6	7	8	9	10	11	12	Total
1	Canada	77	80	*	78	*	81	*	86	74	86	83	87	81
2	Sweden	80	74	80	*	*	75	71	*	86	75	80	88	79
3	Russia	83	*	79	62	78	72	86	79	*	73	*	82	77
4	United States	70	79	*	76	82	*	82	74	83	*	73	66	76
4	Switzerland	81	75	73	*	*	71	71	70	*	86	77	78	76
6	Germany	79	73	*	76	75	*	70	75	79	*	72	75	75
6	(United Kingdom) Great Britain	*	74	70	68	80	72	80	77	*	73	79	*	75
8	China	*	75	71	71	77	79	71	*	76	71	75	*	74
8	Japan	75	74	*	68	*	82	*	66	79	65	78	75	74
10	Denmark	78	*	67	68	60	79	71	79	*	74	*	80	73

== Team statistics ==
=== Men's tournament ===
Country	PF/G	PA/G	EF/G	EA/G	PF/E	PA/E	BE/G	HE%	SE%	FE%
Canada	9.62	4.56	4.56	3.54	2.11	1.29	1.90	0.477	0.143	0.486
China	6.34	7.32	4.51	4.51	1.41	1.62	0.98	0.189	0.205	0.364
Denmark	5.42	7.59	4.10	4.10	1.32	1.85	1.81	0.216	0.196	0.174
France	4.46	7.59	3.25	4.46	1.37	1.70	2.29	0.163	0.235	0.294
Germany	5.78	7.23	4.22	4.58	1.37	1.58	1.20	0.244	0.214	0.333
(United Kingdom) Great Britain	6.79	5.36	4.17	3.45	1.63	1.55	2.38	0.310	0.214	0.262
Norway	7.36	4.94	4.60	3.68	1.60	1.34	1.72	0.472	0.176	0.451
Sweden	5.56	5.78	3.78	4.11	1.47	1.41	2.11	0.273	0.174	0.283
Switzerland	6.02	5.00	3.98	3.75	1.51	1.33	2.27	0.304	0.238	0.333
United States	4.73	6.48	3.63	4.51	1.30	1.44	1.87	0.208	0.238	0.310

=== Women's tournament ===
Country	PF/G	PA/G	EF/G	EA/G	PF/E	PA/E	BE/G	HE%	SE%	FE%
Canada	6.40	4.16	4.49	3.26	1.43	1.28	2.25	0.186	0.283	0.413
China	6.93	5.34	4.43	4.20	1.56	1.27	1.36	0.298	0.171	0.512
Denmark	5.70	7.09	3.60	4.65	1.58	1.53	1.74	0.240	0.139	0.417
Germany	5.84	6.07	3.93	4.38	1.49	1.38	1.69	0.350	0.100	0.420
(United Kingdom) Great Britain	6.14	6.82	4.09	4.66	1.50	1.46	1.25	0.191	0.244	0.390
Japan	7.29	8.24	4.12	4.35	1.77	1.89	1.53	0.350	0.109	0.239
Russia	6.39	7.23	4.34	3.98	1.47	1.82	1.69	0.179	0.295	0.273
Sweden	6.59	6.12	4.24	4.24	1.56	1.27	1.36	0.364	0.122	0.390
Switzerland	8.07	5.78	4.82	4.34	1.68	1.33	0.84	0.385	0.273	0.477
United States	5.12	7.74	4.29	4.29	1.19	1.81	1.43	0.119	0.286	0.286

Key

- PF/G = Average number of points per game
- PA/G = Average number of points against per game
- EF/G = Average number of ends won per game
- EA/G = Average number of ends lost per game
- PF/E = Average number of points per end
- PA/E = Average number of post against per end
- BE/G = Average number of blank ends per game
- HE% = Percentage of ends with last rock advantage where a team scores at least two points
- SE% = Percentage of ends where a team without last rock advantage scores at least one point
- FE% = Percentage of ends where a team without last rock advantage forces their opposition to just one point
