= 2013 Swiss Cup Basel =

- Host city: Arlesheim, Switzerland
- Arena: Curlingzentrum Region Basel
- Dates: October 3–6
- Winner: (Norway) Thomas Ulsrud
- Curling club: Snarøen CC, Oslo
- Skip: Thomas Ulsrud
- Third: Torger Nergård
- Second: Christoffer Svae
- Lead: Håvard Vad Petersson
- Finalist: (Sweden) Oskar Eriksson

The 2013 Swiss Cup Basel was held from October 3 to 6 at the Curlingzentrum Region Basel in Arlesheim, Switzerland as part of the 2013–14 World Curling Tour. The event was held in a round robin format, and the purse for the event was CHF 43,200, of which the winner, Thomas Ulsrud, received CHF 14,000. Ulsrud defeated Oskar Eriksson in the final with a score of 6–3.

== Teams ==
The teams are listed as follows:

Skip	Third	Second	Lead	Alternate	Locale
Evgeniy Arkhipov	Sergei Glukhov	Dmitry Mironov	Artur Ali	Timur Gadzhikhanov	Moscow, Russia
Alexander Attinger	Felix Attinger	Daniel Schifferli	Simon Attinger	Andre Neuenschwander	Dübendorf, Switzerland
Maciej Cesarz	Adam Sterczewski	Łukasz Piworowicz	Tomasz Kierzkowski	Maciej Cylupa	Katowice, Poland
Mark Dacey	Stuart Thompson	Stephen Burgess	Andrew Gibson		(Canada) Halifax, Nova Scotia
Benoît Schwarz (fourth)	Peter de Cruz (skip)	Dominik Märki	Valentin Tanner		Geneva, Switzerland
Alexey Stukalskiy (fourth)	Andrey Drozdov (skip)	Alexey Tselousov	Petr Dron	Anton Kalalb	Moscow, Russia
Tony Angiboust (fourth)	Thomas Dufour (skip)	Wilfrid Coulot	Jérémy Frarier		France
Oskar Eriksson	Kristian Lindström	Markus Eriksson	Christoffer Sundgren		Lit, Sweden
Krisztián Hall (fourth)	Gábor Észöl (skip)	Lajos Belleli	Balazs Varga		Budapest, Hungary
Markus Forejtek	Martin Egretzberger	Marcus Schmitt	Felix Purzner		Korneuburg, Austria
Mario Freiberger	Sven Iten	Patrick Poll	Rainer Kobler		Zug, Switzerland
Logan Gray	Glen Muirhead	Ross Paterson	Richard Woods		Stirling, Scotland
Ritvars Gulbis	Normunds Šaršūns	Aivars Avotiņš	Artūrs Gerhards		Riga, Latvia
Stefan Häsler	Christian Bangerter	Urs Zahnd	Jörg Lüthy		Bern, Switzerland
Grant Hardie	Jay McWilliam	Hammy McMillan Jr.	Billy Morton		Dumfries, Scotland
Marcus Hasselborg	Peder Folke	Andreas Prytz	Anton Sandström	Fredrik Nyman	Sundsvall, Sweden
Michael Hauser	Marc Wagenseil	Bastian Wyss	Etienne Lottenbach	Simon Künzli	Switzerland
Pascal Hess	Florian Meister	Meico Öhninger	Stefan Meienberg		Zug, Switzerland
Markus Høiberg	Steffen Mellemsetter	Steffen Walstad	Magnus Nedregotten		Oppdal, Norway
Felix Schulze (fourth)	John Jahr (skip)	Christopher Bartsch	Sven Goldemann		Füssen, Germany
Konstantin Kämpf	Daniel Neuner	Alexander Kämpf	Dominik Greindl	Sebastian Jacoby	Füssen, Germany
Aku Kauste	Jani Sullanmaa	Pauli Jäämies	Janne Pitko	Leo Mäkelä	Hyvinkaa, Finland
Stefan Turna (fourth)	Pavel Kocian (skip)	Ronald Krcmar	Radomir Vozar	David Misum	Bratislava, Slovakia
Sven Michel	Claudio Pätz	Sandro Trolliet	Simon Gempeler		Adelboden, Switzerland
Amos Mosaner	Andrea Pilzer	Daniele Ferazza	Roberto Arman	Sebastiano Arman	Trentino, Italy
David Murdoch	Tom Brewster	Scott Andrews	Michael Goodfellow	Greg Drummond	Stirling, Scotland
André Neuenschwander	Tobias Güntensberger	Sergio Gobbi	Kevin Keller		Switzerland
Marc Pfister	Roger Meier	Enrico Pfister	Raphael Märki		Bern, Switzerland
Tomi Rantamäki	Pekka Peura	Kimmo Ilvonen	Jermu Pöllanen		Helsinki, Finland
Manuel Ruch	Jean-Nicolas Longchamp	Daniel Graf	Mathias Graf		Uitikon, Switzerland
Roman Ruch	Rolf Bruggmann	Felix Bader	Michael Devaux	Fabian Schmid	Uzwil, Switzerland
Christian Durtschi (fourth)	Michael Schifferli (skip)	Jonas Wälchli	Hubert Lüthi	Andreas Schorer	Bern, Switzerland
David Šik	Radek Boháč	Thomas Paul	Milan Polívka		Prague, Czech Republic
Jiří Snítil	Martin Snítil	Jindřich Kitzberger	Marek Vydra	Jakub Bareš	Prague, Czech Republic
Simone Gonin	Alessio Gonin	Gabriele Ripa	Fabio Cavalloi	Marco Onnis	Italy
Rasmus Stjerne	Johnny Frederiksen	Mikkel Poulsen	Troels Harry	Lars Vilandt	Hvidovre, Denmark
Marc Suter	Michael Müller	Daniel Gubler	Michel Harcuba		Switzerland
Thomas Ulsrud	Torger Nergård	Christoffer Svae	Håvard Vad Petersson		Oslo, Norway
Bernhard Werthemann	Bastian Brun	Yves Hess	Paddy Käser		Bern, Switzerland
Rasmus Wranå	Jordan Wåhlin	Axel Sjöberg	Daniel Lövstrand		Sundbyberg, Sweden

== Round robin standings ==
Final Round Robin Standings

Key
Teams to Playoffs

Group A	W	L
(Denmark) Rasmus Stjerne	4	0
(Latvia) Ritvars Gulbis	2	2
(Switzerland) Michael Hauser	2	2
(Germany) John Jahr	1	3
(Switzerland) Roman Ruch	1	3

Group E	W	L
(Switzerland) Mario Freiberger	3	1
(Italy) Amos Mosaner	3	1
(Czech Republic) Jiří Snítil	2	2
(Switzerland) Stefan Häsler	2	2
(Austria) Markus Forejtek	0	4

Group B	W	L
(Norway) Thomas Ulsrud	4	0
(Russia) Andrey Drozdov	3	1
(Sweden) Marcus Hasselborg	2	2
(Switzerland) Manuel Ruch	1	3
(Italy) Simone Gonin	0	4

Group F	W	L
(Czech Republic) David Šik	4	0
(Switzerland) Pascal Hess	3	1
(Finland) Tomi Rantamäki	2	2
(Canada) Mark Dacey	1	3
(Switzerland) Michael Schifferli	0	4

Group C	W	L
(Switzerland) Sven Michel	3	1
(Scotland) Logan Gray	3	1
(Finland) Aku Kauste	2	2
(Slovakia) Pavel Kocian	1	3
(Switzerland) Marc Suter	1	3

Group G	W	L
(Scotland) David Murdoch	4	0
(Switzerland) Bernhard Werthemann	3	1
(Hungary) Gábor Észöl	1	3
(Switzerland) Marc Pfister	1	3
(Sweden) Rasmus Wranå	1	3

Group D	W	L
(Sweden) Oskar Eriksson	4	0
(Switzerland) Alexander Attinger	3	1
(France) Thomas Dufour	2	2
(Norway) Markus Høiberg	1	3
(Poland) Maciej Cesarz	0	4

Group H	W	L
(Switzerland) Peter de Cruz	4	0
(Russia) Evgeniy Arkhipov	3	1
(Scotland) Grant Hardie	2	2
(Switzerland) André Neuenschwander	1	3
(Germany) Konstantin Kämpf	0	4

== Playoffs ==
Round of 16
(Switzerland) Peter de Cruz	10
(Czech Republic) Jiří Snítil	5
(Italy) Amos Mosaner	5
(Switzerland) Mario Freiberger	3
(Norway) Thomas Ulsrud	7
(Switzerland) Alexander Attinger	2
(Denmark) Rasmus Stjerne	5
(Switzerland) Sven Michel	6
(Scotland) David Murdoch	4
(Russia) Evgeniy Arkhipov	2
(Scotland) Logan Gray	4
(Switzerland) Bernhard Werthemann	3
(Sweden) Oskar Eriksson	8
(Switzerland) Pascal Hess	2
(Czech Republic) David Šik	5
(Russia) Andrey Drozdov	7

Quarterfinals
(Switzerland) Peter de Cruz	5
(Italy) Amos Mosaner	1
(Norway) Thomas Ulsrud	7
(Switzerland) Sven Michel	3
(Scotland) David Murdoch	4
(Scotland) Logan Gray	5
(Sweden) Oskar Eriksson	5
(Russia) Andrey Drozdov	3

Semifinals
(Switzerland) Peter de Cruz	4
(Norway) Thomas Ulsrud	5
(Scotland) Logan Gray	4
(Sweden) Oskar Eriksson	5

Final
(Norway) Thomas Ulsrud	6
(Sweden) Oskar Eriksson	3
