= 2009 European Curling Championships =

Coordinates: 57°08′51″N 2°05′43″W

2009 Le Gruyère European Curling Championships
- Host city: Aberdeen, Scotland
- Arena: Linx Ice Arena
- Dates: 4–12 December
- Men's winner: Sweden
- Curling club: Karlstads CK, Karlstad
- Skip: Niklas Edin
- Third: Sebastian Kraupp
- Second: Fredrik Lindberg
- Lead: Viktor Kjäll
- Alternate: Oskar Eriksson
- Coach: Sören Gran
- Finalist: Switzerland
- Women's winner: Germany
- Curling club: SC Riessersee, Garmisch-Partenkirchen
- Skip: Andrea Schöpp
- Third: Melanie Robillard
- Second: Monika Wagner
- Lead: Corinna Scholz
- Alternate: Stella Heiß
- Coach: Rainer Schöpp
- Finalist: Switzerland

The 2009 Le Gruyère European Curling Championships were held in Aberdeen, Scotland from 4 to 12 December 2009. The A-Group tournament took place at the Linx Ice Arena, and the B-Group are playing at Curl Aberdeen.

A total of 51 teams from 30 European countries were competing.

== Men's Teams ==
=== Group A ===
Nation	Skip	Third	Second	Lead	Alternate
Czech Republic	Jiří Snítil	Martin Snítil	Jindrich Kitzberger	Marek Vydra	Karel Uher
Denmark	Johnny Frederiksen	Ulrik Schmidt*	Bo Jensen	Lars Vilandt	Mikkel Poulsen
Finland	Tomi Rantamäki	Timo Patrikka	Jermu Pöllänen	Lauri Ikävalko	Aku Kauste
France	Thomas Dufour	Tony Angiboust	Jan Ducroz	Richard Ducroz	Raphaël Mathieu
Germany	Andy Kapp	Andreas Lang	Holger Höhne	Andreas Kempf	Uli Kapp
Italy	Stefano Ferronato	Gian Paolo Zandegiacomo	Giorgio Da Rin	Alessandro Zisa	Marco Mariani
Norway	Thomas Ulsrud	Torger Nergård	Christoffer Svae	Håvard Vad Petersson	Thomas Løvold
Scotland	David Murdoch	Ewan MacDonald	Peter Smith	Euan Byers	Graeme Connal
Sweden	Niklas Edin	Sebastian Kraupp	Fredrik Lindberg	Viktor Kjäll	Oskar Eriksson
Switzerland	Ralph Stöckli	Jan Hauser	Markus Eggler	Simon Strübin	Toni Müller

*Ulrik Schmidt skips and throws third stones

==== Round-robin standings ====
Final round-robin standings

Key
Countries to Playoffs
Countries to Tiebreakers
Countries relegated to 2010 Group B

Country	Skip	W	L	PF	PA	Ends Won	Ends Lost	Blank Ends	Stolen Ends	Shot Pct
Norway	Thomas Ulsrud	8	1	76	45	44	30	6	14	84%
Sweden	Niklas Edin	7	2	61	40	34	30	13	10	83%
Switzerland	Ralph Stöckli	6	3	70	44	40	31	13	14	81%
Scotland	David Murdoch	6	3	62	37	36	24	24	16	86%
France	Thomas Dufour	6	3	61	50	36	37	16	12	80%
Germany	Andy Kapp	5	4	57	62	32	36	10	5	78%
Denmark	Ulrik Schmidt	3	6	51	54	31	34	15	8	81%
Czech Republic	Jiří Snítil	2	7	44	69	31	37	15	6	75%
Finland	Tomi Rantämaki	2	7	44	85	28	44	8	8	72%
Italy	Stefano Ferronato	0	9	37	77	26	35	14	5	73%

==== Round Robin ====
===== Draw 1 =====
Saturday 5 December, 08:00

Sheet A	1	2	3	4	5	6	7	8	9	10	Final
Germany (Kapp)	0	3	0	2	0	0	0	2	1	X	8
Denmark (Schmidt)	1	0	1	0	2	0	1	0	0	X	5

Sheet B	1	2	3	4	5	6	7	8	9	10	Final
Italy (Ferronato)	1	0	1	0	1	1	0	0	1	0	5
France (Dufour)	0	2	0	2	0	0	0	1	0	1	6

Sheet C	1	2	3	4	5	6	7	8	9	10	11	Final
Norway (Ulsrud)	0	1	0	2	0	2	0	1	1	0	1	8
Switzerland (Stöckli)	2	0	1	0	1	0	1	0	0	2	0	7

Sheet D	1	2	3	4	5	6	7	8	9	10	Final
Sweden (Edin)	0	1	0	1	0	0	0	0	0	0	2
Scotland (Murdoch)	1	0	1	0	0	0	0	0	0	1	3

Sheet E	1	2	3	4	5	6	7	8	9	10	11	Final
Finland (Rantamäki)	0	3	0	3	0	1	0	1	0	0	1	9
Czech Republic (Snitil)	2	0	2	0	0	0	1	0	2	1	0	8

===== Draw 2 =====
Saturday 3 December, 16:00

Sheet A	1	2	3	4	5	6	7	8	9	10	Final
Finland (Rantamäki)	0	0	1	1	0	1	0	4	0	2	9
Italy (Ferronato)	2	2	0	0	0	0	2	0	1	0	7

Sheet B	1	2	3	4	5	6	7	8	9	10	Final
Switzerland (Stöckli)	0	2	0	2	1	0	1	1	0	2	9
Czech Republic (Snitil)	2	0	1	0	0	1	0	0	2	0	6

Sheet C	1	2	3	4	5	6	7	8	9	10	Final
Germany (Kapp)	1	0	2	0	1	0	0	0	X	X	4
Sweden (Edin)	0	2	0	1	0	2	2	3	X	X	10

Sheet D	1	2	3	4	5	6	7	8	9	10	Final
Norway (Ulsrud)	3	0	0	0	3	0	1	0	1	X	8
Denmark (Schmidt)	0	0	0	1	0	2	0	2	0	X	5

Sheet E	1	2	3	4	5	6	7	8	9	10	Final
France (Dufour)	0	0	0	0	0	2	0	0	0	0	2
Scotland (Murdoch)	0	2	0	1	0	0	1	0	0	1	5

===== Draw 3 =====
Sunday 6 December, 09:00

Sheet A	1	2	3	4	5	6	7	8	9	10	Final
Scotland (Murdoch)	0	1	1	0	0	0	0	0	0	0	2
Czech Republic (Snitil)	1	0	0	0	0	1	0	0	0	1	3

Sheet B	1	2	3	4	5	6	7	8	9	10	Final
Denmark (Schmidt)	0	1	0	1	0	1	0	2	0	X	5
Sweden (Edin)	0	0	2	0	1	0	2	0	2	X	7

Sheet C	1	2	3	4	5	6	7	8	9	10	Final
France (Dufour)	0	0	2	3	1	0	0	0	5	X	11
Finland (Rantamäki)	1	3	0	0	0	1	0	1	0	X	6

Sheet D	1	2	3	4	5	6	7	8	9	10	Final
Switzerland (Stöckli)	0	2	1	0	2	0	5	X	X	X	10
Germany (Kapp)	1	0	0	1	0	1	0	X	X	X	3

Sheet E	1	2	3	4	5	6	7	8	9	10	Final
Norway (Ulsrud)	1	0	0	2	0	2	0	3	0	X	8
Italy (Ferronato)	0	0	3	0	1	0	1	0	1	X	6

===== Draw 4 =====
Sunday 6 December, 19:00

Sheet A	1	2	3	4	5	6	7	8	9	10	Final
Denmark (Schmidt)	0	0	1	0	0	0	3	2	0	0	6
France (Dufour)	1	3	0	1	1	0	0	0	0	1	7

Sheet B	1	2	3	4	5	6	7	8	9	10	Final
Norway (Ulsrud)	0	2	1	0	1	6	X	X	X	X	10
Germany (Kapp)	1	0	0	1	0	0	X	X	X	X	2

Sheet C	1	2	3	4	5	6	7	8	9	10	Final
Italy (Ferronato)	0	0	0	0	1	1	0	2	0	2	6
Czech Republic (Snitil)	0	3	0	1	0	0	3	0	0	0	7

Sheet D	1	2	3	4	5	6	7	8	9	10	Final
Scotland (Murdoch)	3	0	2	3	4	3	X	X	X	X	15
Finland (Rantamäki)	0	1	0	0	0	0	X	X	X	X	1

Sheet E	1	2	3	4	5	6	7	8	9	10	11	Final
Sweden (Edin)	0	1	1	0	0	0	0	2	1	0	1	6
Switzerland (Stöckli)	0	0	0	2	0	2	0	0	0	1	0	5

===== Draw 5 =====
Monday 7 December, 14:00

Sheet A	1	2	3	4	5	6	7	8	9	10	11	Final
Norway (Ulsrud)	3	0	1	1	1	0	0	0	0	1	2	9
Finland (Rantamäki)	0	3	0	0	0	1	1	2	0	0	0	7

Sheet B	1	2	3	4	5	6	7	8	9	10	Final
France (Dufour)	1	1	3	1	0	0	0	0	0	1	7
Switzerland (Stöckli)	0	0	0	0	2	1	1	1	0	0	5

Sheet C	1	2	3	4	5	6	7	8	9	10	Final
Denmark (Schmidt)	0	0	0	0	2	1	0	0	0	X	3
Scotland (Murdoch)	0	3	1	1	0	0	0	2	1	X	8

Sheet D	1	2	3	4	5	6	7	8	9	10	Final
Italy (Ferronato)	0	1	0	1	0	0	X	X	X	X	2
Sweden (Edin)	1	0	3	0	0	4	X	X	X	X	8

Sheet E	1	2	3	4	5	6	7	8	9	10	Final
Czech Republic (Snitil)	0	0	0	0	0	1	0	2	1	0	4
Germany (Kapp)	0	0	3	0	1	0	2	0	0	1	7

===== Draw 6 =====
Tuesday 8 December, 08:00

Sheet A	1	2	3	4	5	6	7	8	9	10	Final
Czech Republic (Snitil)	1	0	2	0	1	0	1	0	X	X	5
Sweden (Edin)	0	3	0	4	0	1	0	2	X	X	10

Sheet B	1	2	3	4	5	6	7	8	9	10	Final
Germany (Kapp)	0	2	1	0	0	4	0	0	0	0	7
Scotland (Murdoch)	1	0	0	1	1	0	2	2	2	1	10

Sheet C	1	2	3	4	5	6	7	8	9	10	Final
Switzerland (Stöckli)	0	4	0	6	1	0	2	X	X	X	13
Italy (Ferronato)	0	0	2	0	0	2	0	X	X	X	4

Sheet D	1	2	3	4	5	6	7	8	9	10	Final
France (Dufour)	0	0	1	0	2	0	1	0	0	3	7
Norway (Ulsrud)	1	0	0	1	0	2	0	1	0	0	5

Sheet E	1	2	3	4	5	6	7	8	9	10	Final
Denmark (Schmidt)	1	0	0	1	1	0	5	1	X	X	9
Finland (Rantamäki)	0	1	1	0	0	1	0	0	X	X	3

===== Draw 7 =====
Tuesday 8 December, 16:00

Sheet A	1	2	3	4	5	6	7	8	9	10	Final
Italy (Ferronato)	0	0	0	1	0	0	0	X	X	X	1
Germany (Kapp)	0	0	2	0	1	2	4	X	X	X	9

Sheet B	1	2	3	4	5	6	7	8	9	10	Final
Czech Republic (Snitil)	0	0	0	1	0	1	0	2	0	X	4
Denmark (Schmidt)	0	1	0	0	2	0	3	0	1	X	7

Sheet C	1	2	3	4	5	6	7	8	9	10	11	Final
Sweden (Edin)	0	0	0	2	0	1	1	1	0	0	1	6
France (Dufour)	1	1	0	0	2	0	0	0	0	1	0	5

Sheet D	1	2	3	4	5	6	7	8	9	10	Final
Finland (Rantamäki)	0	0	0	0	0	1	0	1	X	X	2
Switzerland (Stöckli)	2	1	1	2	1	0	1	0	X	X	8

Sheet E	1	2	3	4	5	6	7	8	9	10	Final
Scotland (Murdoch)	1	1	0	0	0	1	0	2	0	0	5
Norway (Ulsrud)	0	0	2	1	1	0	2	0	1	2	9

===== Draw 8 =====
Wednesday 9 December, 09:00

Sheet A	1	2	3	4	5	6	7	8	9	10	Final
Switzerland (Stöckli)	0	2	0	0	2	0	0	0	1	1	6
Scotland (Murdoch)	0	0	2	0	0	3	0	0	0	0	5

Sheet B	1	2	3	4	5	6	7	8	9	10	Final
Sweden (Edin)	0	2	2	2	0	2	1	X	X	X	9
Finland (Rantamäki)	0	0	0	0	1	0	0	X	X	X	1

Sheet C	1	2	3	4	5	6	7	8	9	10	Final
Czech Republic (Snitil)	0	1	0	1	0	1	0	X	X	X	3
Norway (Ulsrud)	2	0	2	0	4	0	1	X	X	X	9

Sheet D	1	2	3	4	5	6	7	8	9	10	Final
Denmark (Schmidt)	1	0	0	1	0	4	2	X	X	X	8
Italy (Ferronato)	0	1	1	0	0	0	0	X	X	X	2

Sheet E	1	2	3	4	5	6	7	8	9	10	11	Final
Germany (Kapp)	1	0	1	0	2	0	2	0	0	0	2	8
France (Dufour)	0	1	0	1	0	2	0	1	0	1	0	6

===== Draw 9 =====
Wednesday 9 December, 19:00

Sheet A	1	2	3	4	5	6	7	8	9	10	Final
Sweden (Edin)	0	0	0	0	3	0	0	X	X	X	3
Norway (Ulsrud)	1	1	2	2	0	2	2	X	X	X	10

Sheet B	1	2	3	4	5	6	7	8	9	10	Final
Scotland (Murdoch)	2	0	0	0	2	0	3	0	2	X	9
Italy (Ferronato)	0	0	0	0	0	2	0	2	0	X	4

Sheet C	1	2	3	4	5	6	7	8	9	10	Final
Finland (Rantamäki)	0	0	0	3	0	2	0	1	0	0	6
Germany (Kapp)	0	0	2	0	1	0	3	0	0	3	9

Sheet D	1	2	3	4	5	6	7	8	9	10	Final
Czech Republic (Snitil)	2	0	0	0	1	0	1	0	X	X	4
France (Dufour)	0	0	1	4	0	3	0	2	X	X	10

Sheet E	1	2	3	4	5	6	7	8	9	10	Final
Switzerland (Stöckli)	2	0	0	0	2	0	0	0	1	2	7
Denmark (Schmidt)	0	0	0	1	0	2	0	0	0	0	3

===== Placement Game =====
Team	1	2	3	4	5	6	7	8	9	10	Final
Czech Republic (Snitil)	0	3	0	1	0	0	0	0	0	1	5
Finland (Rantamaki)	2	0	0	0	1	0	0	1	0	0	4

===== Tiebreaker =====
Team	1	2	3	4	5	6	7	8	9	10	Final
Scotland (Murdoch)	1	1	1	0	0	0	0	3	1	X	7
France (Dufour)	0	0	0	0	0	1	1	0	0	X	2

Player percentages
Scotland		France	
Euan Byers	89%	Richard Ducroz	84%
Peter Smith	96%	Jan Ducroz	85%
Ewan MacDonald	89%	Tony Angiboust	71%
David Murdoch	77%	Thomas Dufour	65%
Total	88%	Total	76%

==== Playoffs ====
Page playoff system
1	Norway	3
2	Sweden	7
3	Switzerland	7
4	Scotland	3

Semifinal
1	Norway	5
3	Switzerland	8

Final
2	Sweden	6
3	Switzerland	5

===== 1 vs. 2 game =====
Thursday 10 December, 20:00

Team	1	2	3	4	5	6	7	8	9	10	Final
Norway (Ulsrud)	0	0	2	0	0	0	1	0	0	X	3
Sweden (Edin)	0	1	0	2	1	1	0	1	1	X	7

Player percentages
Sweden		Norway	
Viktor Kjäll	84%	Håvard Vad Petersson	77%
Fredrik Lindberg	82%	Christoffer Svae	76%
Sebastian Kraupp	72%	Torger Nergård	78%
Niklas Edin	84%	Thomas Ulsrud	65%
Total	80%	Total	74%

===== 3 vs. 4 game =====
Thursday 10 December, 20:00

Team	1	2	3	4	5	6	7	8	9	10	Final
Switzerland (Stöckli)	2	0	2	0	1	0	1	0	1	X	7
Scotland (Murdoch)	0	1	0	1	0	0	0	1	0	X	3

Player percentages
Switzerland		Scotland	
Simon Strübin	69%	Euan Byers	81%
Markus Eggler	89%	Peter Smith	59%
Jan Hauser	80%	Ewan MacDonald	74%
Ralph Stöckli	88%	David Murdoch	74%
Total	81%	Total	72%

===== Semifinal =====
Friday 11 December, 14:00

Team	1	2	3	4	5	6	7	8	9	10	11	Final
Norway (Ulsrud)	2	0	0	1	1	0	0	0	0	1	0	5
Switzerland (Stöckli)	0	1	0	0	0	0	3	1	0	0	3	8

Player percentages
Norway		Switzerland	
Håvard Vad Petersson	87%	Simon Strübin	85%
Christoffer Svae	96%	Markus Eggler	72%
Torger Nergård	84%	Jan Hauser	80%
Thomas Ulsrud	80%	Ralph Stöckli	88%
Total	87%	Total	81%

===== Gold Medal Final =====
Saturday 12 December, 13:30

Team	1	2	3	4	5	6	7	8	9	10	11	Final
Sweden (Edin)	0	3	0	0	1	0	0	1	0	0	1	6
Switzerland (Stöckli)	0	0	2	0	0	2	0	0	0	1	0	5

Player percentages
Sweden		Switzerland	
Viktor Kjäll	81%	Simon Strübin	89%
Fredrik Lindberg	85%	Markus Eggler	88%
Sebastian Kraupp	93%	Jan Hauser	79%
Niklas Edin	86%	Ralph Stöckli	84%
Total	86%	Total	85%

=== Group B1 ===
Nation	Skip	Third	Second	Lead	Alternate
Bulgaria	Lubomir Velinov	Stoil Georgiev	Kiril Kirilov	Stanko Velinov	Stanimir Petrov
England	Jamie Malton	Michael Opel	Henry Carter	Keith Wilson	John Brown
Estonia	Erkki Lill	Harri Lill	Jaanus Lindre	Toomas Lill	Tanel Telliskivi
Greece	Nikolaos Zacharias	Georgios Arampatzis	Dionysios Karakostas	Athanassios Pantios	Efstratios Kokkinellis
Lithuania	Tadas Vyskupaitis	Vidas Sadauskas	Vytis Kulakauskas	Laurynas Telksnys	Vygantas Zalieckas
Netherlands	Mark Neeleman	Mark Rurup	Marcel Rijkes	Jeroen Vermeulen	
Poland	Borys Jasiecki	Tomasz Cierkowski	Szymon Blaszkowski	Bartosz Sitkiewicz	Lukasz Krych
Russia	Andrey Drozdov	Artem Bolduzev	Aleksandr Kirikov	Alexey Stukalsky	Valentin Demenkov
Serbia	Bojan Mijatovic	Marko Stojanovic	Goran Ungurovic	Djordje Neskovic	
Spain	Carlos Lorente Gomez	Jose Maria Hernandez Berenguer	Miguel Barnils Ventura	Genis Rodriguez Puig	Carlos Marcos Sabi

==== Results ====
Country	W	L
Russia	9	0
Netherlands	7	2
England	7	2
Estonia	5	4
Bulgaria	4	5
Poland	4	5
Spain	4	5
Greece	3	6
Lithuania	2	7
Serbia	0	9

All times local

Draw 1 Saturday 5 December, 08:00

- Lithuania 2, Netherlands 13
- England 8, Greece 5
- Serbia 2, Estonia 15
- Spain 7, Bulgaria 6
- Poland 6, Russia 10

Draw 2 Saturday 5 December, 16:00

- Bulgaria 3, Russia 8
- Netherlands 8, Spain 6
- Greece 8, Poland 5
- Estonia 14, Lithuania 4

Draw 3 Sunday 6 December, 08:00

- Poland 9, England 4
- Estonia 4, Russia 6
- Lithuania 5, Spain 8
- Serbia 2, Netherlands 11
- Greece 9, Bulgaria 6

Draw 4 Sunday 6 December, 16:00

- Netherlands 12, Greece 0
- Serbia 4, Lithuania 15
- England 4, Russia 7
- Bulgaria 10, Poland 9

Draw 5 Monday 7 December, 12:00

- Serbia 6, Poland 7
- Greece 1, Estonia 13
- Netherlands 8, Bulgaria 6
- England 9, Spain 1
- Russia 10, Lithuania 3

Draw 6 Monday 7 December, 20:00

- Russia 9, Spain 1
- Lithuania 3, Bulgaria 8
- Estonia 1, England 2
- Greece 7, Serbia 1

Draw 7 Tuesday 8 December, 12:00

- England 8, Lithuania 0
- Russia 9, Netherlands 3
- Spain 11, Greece 3
- Poland 3, Estonia 4
- Bulgaria 10, Serbia 8

Draw 8 Tuesday 8 December, 20:00

- Estonia 7, Bulgaria 9
- Spain 1, Poland 9
- Russia 10, Serbia 2
- Netherlands 5, England 7

Draw 9 Wednesday 9 December, 08:00

- Netherlands 10, Poland 1
- Lithuania 7, Greece 6
- Serbia 2, England 10
- Spain 2, Estonia 11

Draw 10 Wednesday 9 December, 16:00

- Spain 8, Serbia 1
- Bulgaria 4, England 8
- Poland 13, Lithuania 7
- Russia 10, Greece 1
- Estonia 5, Netherlands 6

Tiebreaker

- England 5, Netherlands 9

=== Group B2 ===
Nation	Skip	Third	Second	Lead	Alternate
Austria	Harald Fendt	Andreas Unterberger	Florian Huber	Dominik Bertsch	Christian Roth
Belarus	Ihar Platonov	Anton Batugin	Yury Pauliuchyk	Andrey Aulasenka	Yury Karanevich
Belgium	Marc Suter	Thomas Suter	Walter Verbueken	Stephen Allan	Peter Suter
Croatia	Alen Cadez	Alberto Skendrovic	Drazen Cutic	Ognjen Golubic	Davor Palcec
Hungary	Lajos Belleli	Gabor Riesz	Zsombor Rokusfalvy	Gabor Molnar	Andrasz Rokusfalvy
Iceland	Jon Ingi Sigurdsson	Olafur Freyr Numason	Jens Kristinn Gislason	Haraldur Ingolfsson	Sveinn Steingrimsson
Ireland	Robin Gray	Peter Wilson	John Jo Kenny	Neil Fyfe	Bill Gray
Latvia	Ritvars Gulbis	Ainars Gulbis	Normunds Sarsuns	Aivars Avotins	
Slovakia	Pavol Pitonak	Frantisek Pitonak	Tomas Pitonak	Peter Pitonak	Stefan Turna
Wales	Adrian Meikle	Stuart Hills	James Pougher	Andrew Tanner	John Sharpe

==== Results ====
Country	W	L
Hungary	8	1
Ireland	7	2
Latvia	7	2
Wales	7	2
Austria	6	3
Belgium	4	5
Croatia	3	6
Iceland	2	7
Slovakia	1	8
Belarus	0	9

All times local

Draw 1 Saturday 5 December, 12:00

- Croatia 4, Hungary 11
- Latvia 11, Belarus 3
- Iceland 8, Slovakia 3
- Ireland 7, Austria 5
- Belgium 5, Wales 8

Draw 2 Saturday 5 December, 20:00

- Austria 5, Wales 10
- Hungary 7, Ireland 5
- Belarus 5, Belgium 13
- Slovakia 5, Croatia 7

Draw 3 Sunday 6 December, 12:00

- Belgium 4, Latvia 15
- Slovakia 8, Wales 9
- Croatia 4, Ireland 14
- Iceland 2, Hungary 9
- Belarus 4, Austria 12

Draw 4 Sunday 6 December, 20:00

- Hungary 8, Belarus 2
- Iceland 5, Croatia 8
- Latvia 10, Wales 6
- Austria 6, Belgium 3

Draw 5 Monday 7 December, 08:00

- Iceland 4, Belgium 8
- Belarus 0, Slovakia 14
- Hungary 5, Austria 6
- Latvia 8, Ireland 9
- Wales 15, Croatia 1

Draw 6 Monday 7 December, 16:00

- Wales 8, Ireland 7
- Croatia 5, Austria 11
- Slovakia 2, Latvia 9
- Belarus 4, Iceland 10

Draw 7 Tuesday 8 December, 08:00

- Latvia 10, Croatia 0
- Wales 4, Hungary 7
- Ireland 11, Belarus 4
- Belgium 7, Slovakia 6
- Austria 11, Iceland 5

Draw 8 Tuesday 8 December, 16:00

- Slovakia 4, Austria 7
- Ireland 9, Belgium 4
- Wales 8, Iceland 6
- Hungary 6, Latvia 3

Draw 9 Wednesday 9 December, 12:00

- Hungary 8, Belgium 5
- Croatia 7, Belarus 6
- Iceland 2, Latvia 12
- Ireland 8, Slovakia 3

Draw 10 Wednesday 9 December, 20:00

- Ireland 10, Iceland 2
- Austria 3, Latvia 9
- Belgium 9, Croatia 7
- Wales 12, Belarus 2
- Slovakia 6, Hungary 7

Tiebreakers

- Ireland 11, Wales 4
- Ireland 9, Latvia 7

=== Group B Playoffs ===
Page playoff system
1	Russia	7
2	Hungary	3
3	Netherlands	9
4	Ireland	4

Semifinal
2	Hungary	4
3	Netherlands	6

Final
1	Russia	4
3	Netherlands	8

Russia and Netherlands advance to the A-Group

=== World Challenge Games ===
Friday 11 December, 19:00

- Denmark 6, Netherlands 2

Saturday 12 December, 08:00

- Denmark 10, Netherlands 5

== Women's Teams ==
=== Group A ===
Nation	Skip	Third	Second	Lead	Alternate
Denmark	Madeleine Dupont	Denise Dupont	Angelina Jensen*	Camilla Jensen	Ane Hansen
England	Kirsty Balfour	Caroline Reed	Suzie Law	Nicola Woodward	Joan Reed
Finland	Ellen Vogt	Katja Kiiskinen	Riikka Louhivuori	Elisa Alatalo	Oona Kauste
Germany	Andrea Schöpp	Melanie Robillard	Monika Wagner	Stella Heiß	Corinna Scholz
Italy	Giorgia Appolonio	Elettra de Col	Claudia Alvera	Eleonora Alvera	Georgia De Lotto
Norway	Marianne Rørvik	Linn Githmark	Henriette Løvar	Kristin Skaslien	Ingrid Stensrud
Russia	Ludmila Privivkova	Anna Sidorova	Nkeiruka Ezekh	Ekaterina Galkina	Olga Jarkova
Scotland	Eve Muirhead	Jackie Lockhart	Kelly Wood	Lorna Vevers	Karen Addison
Sweden	Anette Norberg	Eva Lund	Cathrine Lindahl	Anna Svärd	Kajsa Bergström
Switzerland	Mirjam Ott	Carmen Schäfer	Carmen Küng	Janine Greiner	Binia Feltscher-Beeli

*Jensen skips and throws second stones

==== Round-robin standings ====
Final round-robin standings

Key
Countries to Playoffs
Countries to Tiebreakers
Countries relegated to 2010 Group B

Country	Skip	W	L	PF	PA	Ends Won	Ends Lost	Blank Ends	Stolen Ends	Shot Pct.
Switzerland	Mirjam Ott	7	2	70	43	42	32	7	17	78%
Denmark	Angelina Jensen	6	3	58	52	37	35	5	10	68%
Germany	Andrea Schöpp	6	3	53	47	32	34	13	10	71%
Russia	Ludmila Privivkova	6	3	64	43	44	33	7	16	76%
Sweden	Anette Norberg	6	3	58	42	34	33	14	8	76%
Scotland	Eve Muirhead	5	4	53	52	41	34	8	14	78%
Norway	Marianne Rørvik	4	5	53	61	36	35	7	12	68%
Finland	Ellen Vogt	3	6	47	65	31	42	8	6	64%
Italy	Giorgia Appolonio	2	7	57	71	33	42	9	8	65%
England	Kirsty Balfour	0	9	43	82	32	42	3	12	65%

==== Round Robin ====
===== Draw 1 =====
Saturday 5 December, 12:00

Sheet A	1	2	3	4	5	6	7	8	9	10	Final
Russia (Privivkova)	0	2	0	0	1	2	0	2	0	1	8
England (Balfour)	1	0	1	1	0	0	1	0	1	0	5

Sheet B	1	2	3	4	5	6	7	8	9	10	Final
Germany (Schöpp)	1	0	0	3	1	0	1	0	1	X	7
Sweden (Norberg)	0	1	0	0	0	1	0	2	0	X	4

Sheet C	1	2	3	4	5	6	7	8	9	10	Final
Scotland (Muirhead)	0	2	1	1	0	0	1	1	0	X	6
Italy (Appolonio)	2	0	0	0	5	3	0	0	1	X	11

Sheet D	1	2	3	4	5	6	7	8	9	10	Final
Denmark (Jensen)	0	2	2	2	0	1	0	0	2	X	9
Finland (Vogt)	1	0	0	0	1	0	1	1	0	X	4

Sheet E	1	2	3	4	5	6	7	8	9	10	Final
Switzerland (Ott)	0	2	0	1	0	1	2	0	0	X	6
Norway (Rørvik)	0	0	1	0	1	0	0	1	1	X	4

===== Draw 2 =====
Saturday 5 December, 20:00

Sheet A	1	2	3	4	5	6	7	8	9	10	Final
Switzerland (Ott)	0	1	1	2	2	0	4	X	X	X	10
Germany (Schöpp)	1	0	0	0	0	1	0	X	X	X	2

Sheet B	1	2	3	4	5	6	7	8	9	10	11	Final
Italy (Appolonio)	2	2	0	1	0	0	0	0	0	1	0	6
Norway (Rørvik)	0	0	2	0	0	1	1	1	1	0	1	7

Sheet C	1	2	3	4	5	6	7	8	9	10	Final
Russia (Privivkova)	1	1	0	4	3	1	X	X	X	X	10
Denmark (Jensen)	0	0	1	0	0	0	X	X	X	X	1

Sheet D	1	2	3	4	5	6	7	8	9	10	Final
Scotland (Muirhead)	0	1	1	1	2	0	0	1	1	X	7
England (Balfour)	1	0	0	0	0	1	2	0	0	X	4

Sheet E	1	2	3	4	5	6	7	8	9	10	Final
Sweden (Norberg)	0	0	2	3	0	1	0	3	X	X	9
Finland (Vogt)	0	1	0	0	1	0	0	0	X	X	2

===== Draw 3 =====
Sunday 6 December, 14:00

Sheet A	1	2	3	4	5	6	7	8	9	10	Final
Finland (Vogt)	0	0	0	2	0	1	0	0	0	X	3
Norway (Rørvik)	0	3	0	0	2	0	1	1	1	X	8

Sheet B	1	2	3	4	5	6	7	8	9	10	Final
England (Balfour)	0	2	0	1	2	0	2	0	0	X	7
Denmark (Jensen)	1	0	3	0	0	1	0	4	2	X	11

Sheet C	1	2	3	4	5	6	7	8	9	10	Final
Sweden (Norberg)	2	0	1	0	0	2	0	1	0	1	7
Switzerland (Ott)	0	2	0	1	1	0	0	0	2	0	6

Sheet D	1	2	3	4	5	6	7	8	9	10	Final
Italy (Appolonio)	0	0	2	0	1	0	1	1	0	X	5
Russia (Privivkova)	4	1	0	1	0	3	0	0	2	X	11

Sheet E	1	2	3	4	5	6	7	8	9	10	Final
Scotland (Muirhead)	0	1	0	1	0	0	1	1	1	X	5
Germany (Schöpp)	0	0	1	0	1	0	0	0	0	X	2

===== Draw 4 =====
Monday 7 December, 09:00

Sheet A	1	2	3	4	5	6	7	8	9	10	Final
England (Balfour)	1	0	1	0	0	0	1	0	X	X	3
Sweden (Norberg)	0	6	0	0	1	1	0	2	X	X	10

Sheet B	1	2	3	4	5	6	7	8	9	10	Final
Scotland (Muirhead)	0	1	0	0	0	1	0	0	1	X	3
Russia (Privivkova)	2	0	1	0	1	0	1	1	0	X	6

Sheet C	1	2	3	4	5	6	7	8	9	10	Final
Germany (Schöpp)	0	2	0	0	4	4	0	0	X	X	10
Norway (Rørvik)	0	0	2	1	0	0	1	1	X	X	5

Sheet D	1	2	3	4	5	6	7	8	9	10	Final
Finland (Vogt)	0	0	1	1	0	0	1	0	1	X	4
Switzerland (Ott)	2	1	0	0	2	0	0	1	0	X	6

Sheet E	1	2	3	4	5	6	7	8	9	10	Final
Denmark (Jensen)	3	0	2	1	2	0	X	X	X	X	8
Italy (Appolonio)	0	1	0	0	0	1	X	X	X	X	2

===== Draw 5 =====
Monday 7 December, 19:00

Sheet A	1	2	3	4	5	6	7	8	9	10	Final
Scotland (Muirhead)	0	0	2	0	2	0	1	0	0	X	5
Switzerland (Ott)	0	1	0	2	0	1	0	3	4	X	11

Sheet B	1	2	3	4	5	6	7	8	9	10	Final
Sweden (Norberg)	1	0	0	4	0	0	0	2	0	1	8
Italy (Appolonio)	0	0	2	0	0	0	1	0	2	0	5

Sheet C	1	2	3	4	5	6	7	8	9	10	Final
England (Balfour)	1	1	0	1	0	0	X	X	X	X	3
Finland (Vogt)	0	0	3	0	2	5	X	X	X	X	10

Sheet D	1	2	3	4	5	6	7	8	9	10	Final
Germany (Schöpp)	0	1	0	0	0	1	0	2	0	X	4
Denmark (Jensen)	1	0	2	0	2	0	1	0	1	X	7

Sheet E	1	2	3	4	5	6	7	8	9	10	Final
Norway (Rørvik)	0	0	1	2	0	0	1	0	0	0	4
Russia (Privivkova)	1	1	0	0	1	2	0	0	1	3	9

===== Draw 6 =====
Tuesday 8 December, 12:00

Sheet A	1	2	3	4	5	6	7	8	9	10	Final
Norway (Rørvik)	1	0	2	1	4	0	1	X	X	X	9
Denmark (Jensen)	0	2	0	0	0	1	0	X	X	X	3

Sheet B	1	2	3	4	5	6	7	8	9	10	11	Final
Russia (Privivkova)	1	0	1	1	1	1	0	1	0	1	0	7
Finland (Vogt)	0	3	0	0	0	0	3	0	1	0	1	8

Sheet C	1	2	3	4	5	6	7	8	9	10	Final
Italy (Appolonio)	0	1	0	1	0	0	0	1	1	0	4
Germany (Schöpp)	3	0	0	0	0	0	2	0	0	2	7

Sheet D	1	2	3	4	5	6	7	8	9	10	Final
Sweden (Norberg)	0	0	1	0	0	0	1	0	0	X	2
Scotland (Muirhead)	0	2	0	1	2	1	0	1	1	X	8

Sheet E	1	2	3	4	5	6	7	8	9	10	Final
England (Balfour)	0	0	0	0	1	1	0	0	X	X	2
Switzerland (Ott)	2	1	0	2	0	0	1	2	X	X	8

===== Draw 7 =====
Tuesday 8 December, 20:00

Sheet A	1	2	3	4	5	6	7	8	9	10	Final
Germany (Schöpp)	0	2	0	0	0	0	2	1	1	X	6
Russia (Privivkova)	0	0	2	0	0	1	0	0	0	X	3

Sheet B	1	2	3	4	5	6	7	8	9	10	Final
Norway (Rørvik)	2	0	1	0	0	4	0	2	0	X	9
England (Balfour)	0	1	0	1	1	0	3	0	1	X	7

Sheet C	1	2	3	4	5	6	7	8	9	10	11	Final
Denmark (Jensen)	0	0	1	0	1	0	0	1	0	1	1	5
Sweden (Norberg)	0	0	0	1	0	2	0	0	1	0	0	4

Sheet D	1	2	3	4	5	6	7	8	9	10	Final
Switzerland (Ott)	0	1	0	5	0	1	1	0	2	X	10
Italy (Appolonio)	2	0	1	0	0	0	0	3	0	X	6

Sheet E	1	2	3	4	5	6	7	8	9	10	Final
Finland (Vogt)	0	0	1	0	2	0	0	0	1	0	4
Scotland (Muirhead)	2	1	0	2	0	0	1	0	0	1	7

===== Draw 8 =====
Wednesday 9 December, 14:00

Sheet A	1	2	3	4	5	6	7	8	9	10	11	Final
Italy (Appolonio)	0	1	0	0	2	0	3	0	3	0	0	9
Finland (Vogt)	2	0	1	1	0	1	0	2	0	2	1	10

Sheet B	1	2	3	4	5	6	7	8	9	10	Final
Denmark (Jensen)	2	0	1	0	0	1	2	0	0	0	6
Switzerland (Ott)	0	1	0	2	1	0	0	0	2	1	7

Sheet C	1	2	3	4	5	6	7	8	9	10	Final
Norway (Rørvik)	0	2	0	1	0	1	0	0	1	X	5
Scotland (Muirhead)	2	0	2	0	2	0	0	1	0	X	7

Sheet D	1	2	3	4	5	6	7	8	9	10	Final
England (Balfour)	1	0	0	0	2	0	0	3	1	0	7
Germany (Schöpp)	0	1	1	0	0	1	4	0	0	1	8

Sheet E	1	2	3	4	5	6	7	8	9	10	Final
Russia (Privivkova)	1	0	0	1	1	0	0	1	0	0	4
Sweden (Norberg)	0	0	1	0	0	2	0	0	1	1	5

===== Draw 9 =====
Thursday 10 December, 08:00

Sheet A	1	2	3	4	5	6	7	8	9	10	Final
Denmark (Jensen)	1	1	0	1	0	0	2	0	1	1	7
Scotland (Muirhead)	0	0	1	0	1	1	0	2	0	0	5

Sheet B	1	2	3	4	5	6	7	8	9	10	Final
Finland (Vogt)	0	0	0	0	1	0	1	0	X	X	2
Germany (Schöpp)	0	1	2	1	0	1	0	2	X	X	7

Sheet C	1	2	3	4	5	6	7	8	9	10	Final
Switzerland (Ott)	2	0	1	0	1	1	0	0	1	0	6
Russia (Privivkova)	0	1	0	2	0	0	2	1	0	1	7

Sheet D	1	2	3	4	5	6	7	8	9	10	Final
Norway (Rørvik)	0	0	0	2	0	0	X	X	X	X	2
Sweden (Norberg)	2	2	1	0	2	3	X	X	X	X	10

Sheet E	1	2	3	4	5	6	7	8	9	10	Final
Italy (Appolonio)	0	0	1	2	1	0	0	3	2	X	9
England (Balfour)	2	1	0	0	0	2	0	0	0	X	5

===== Tiebreaker =====
Team	1	2	3	4	5	6	7	8	9	10	11	Final
Sweden (Norberg)	1	0	0	0	0	1	0	1	0	1	0	4
Russia (Privivkova)	0	0	1	1	0	0	1	0	1	0	1	5

Player percentages
Sweden		Russia	
Anna Svärd	78%	Ekaterina Galkina	80%
Cathrine Lindahl	63%	Nkeiruka Ezekh	71%
Eva Lund	63%	Anna Sidorova	53%
Anette Norberg	81%	Ludmila Privivkova	82%
Total	71%	Total	72%

==== Playoffs ====
Page playoff system
1	Switzerland	8
2	Denmark	5
3	Germany	10
4	Russia	4

Semifinal
2	Denmark	5
3	Germany	6

Final
1	Switzerland	5
3	Germany	7

===== 1 vs. 2 game =====
Thursday 10 December, 20:00

Team	1	2	3	4	5	6	7	8	9	10	Final
Switzerland (Ott)	2	1	0	1	0	0	3	0	1	X	8
Denmark (Jensen)	0	0	3	0	0	1	0	1	0	X	5

Player percentages
Switzerland		Denmark	
Janine Greiner	69%	Camilla Jensen	86%
Carmen Küng	67%	Angelina Jensen	82%
Carmen Schäfer	85%	Denise Dupont	57%
Mirjam Ott	84%	Madeleine Dupont	75%
Total	76%	Total	75%

===== 3 vs. 4 game =====
Thursday 10 December, 20:00

Team	1	2	3	4	5	6	7	8	9	10	Final
Germany (Schöpp)	0	0	2	0	0	2	3	0	3	X	10
Russia (Privivkova)	0	0	0	1	1	0	0	2	0	X	4

Player percentages
Germany		Russia	
Corinna Scholz	51%	Ekaterina Galkina	75%
Monika Wagner	72%	Olga Jarkova	56%
Melanie Robillard	73%	Anna Sidorova	66%
Andrea Schöpp	78%	Liudmila Privivkova	69%
Total	69%	Total	66%

===== Semifinal =====
Friday 11 December, 19:00

Team	1	2	3	4	5	6	7	8	9	10	11	Final
Denmark (Jensen)	0	0	1	0	2	0	0	0	1	1	0	5
Germany (Schöpp)	0	0	0	1	0	0	3	1	0	0	1	6

Player percentages
Denmark		Germany	
Camilla Jensen	92%	Corinna Scholz	73%
Angelina Jensen	72%	Monika Wagner	71%
Denise Dupont	75%	Melanie Robillard	86%
Madeleine Dupont	77%	Andrea Schöpp	87%
Total	79%	Total	79%

===== Gold Medal Final =====
Saturday 12 December, 10:00

Team	1	2	3	4	5	6	7	8	9	10	Final
Switzerland (Ott)	1	0	2	0	0	1	1	0	0	0	5
Germany (Schöpp)	0	1	0	2	2	0	0	1	0	1	7

Player percentages
Switzerland		Germany	
Janine Greiner	87%	Corinna Scholz	86%
Carmen Küng	83%	Monika Wagner	87%
Carmen Schäfer	87%	Melanie Robillard	82%
Mirjam Ott	72%	Andrea Schöpp	90%
Total	82%	Total	86%

=== Group B1 ===
Nation	Skip	Third	Second	Lead	Alternate
Croatia	Melani Lusic	Marijana Bozic	Maja Sertic	Emina Crnaic	Katarina Radonic
Latvia	Iveta Staša-Šaršūne	Una Grava-Germane	Ieva Krusta	Zanda Bikše	Dace Munča
Netherlands	Shari Leibbrandt-Demmon	Ester Romijn	Marianne Neeleman	Linda de Wit	Margrietha Voskuilen
Poland	Maria Klus	Magdalena Muskus	Elzbieta Ran	Agnieszka Handzlik	Magda Straczek
Slovakia	Daniela Matulova	Veronika Kvasnovska	Linda Haferova	Terezia Gabovicova	Jana Matulova
Wales	Laura Beever	Lisa Peters	Andrea Greenwood	Jane Robbins	

==== Results ====
Country	W	L
Netherlands	5	0
Latvia	4	1
Poland	3	2
Wales	2	3
Slovakia	1	4
Croatia	0	5

All times local

Draw 1 Saturday 5 December, 08:00

- Wales 2, Netherlands 15

Draw 2 Saturday 5 December, 16:00

- Poland 10, Croatia 3
- Slovakia 1, Latvia 14

Draw 3 Sunday 6 December, 08:00

- Croatia 10, Latvia 12

Draw 4 Sunday 6 December, 16:00

- Slovakia 3, Netherlands 11
- Wales 1, Poland 8

Draw 5 Monday 7 December, 12:00

- Croatia 1, Netherlands 4

Draw 6 Monday 7 December, 20:00

- Latvia 8, Poland 6
- Slovakia 6, Wales 8

Draw 7 Tuesday 8 December, 12:00

- Netherlands 8, Poland 2

Draw 8 Tuesday 8 December, 20:00

- Croatia 6, Slovakia 13
- Latvia 8, Wales 2

Draw 9 Wednesday 9 December, 08:00

- Netherlands 6, Latvia 5
- Poland vs. Slovakia

Draw 10 Wednesday 9 December, 16:00

- Wales 13, Croatia 3

=== Group B2 ===
Nation	Skip	Third	Second	Lead	Alternate
Austria	Karina Toth	Jacqui Greiner	Jasmin Seidl	Constanze Hummelt	
Czech Republic	Hana Synackova	Lenka Kitzbergerova	Pavla Rubasova	Karolina Pilarova	Lenka Kucerova
Estonia	Ööle Janson	Kristiine Lill	Katrink Kuusk	Marju Velga	
Hungary	Ildiko Szekeres	Gyöngyi Nagy	Boglarka Adam	Krisztina Bartalus	
Spain	Ellen Kittelsen	Ana Arce	Leticia Hinojosa	Irene Santiago	

==== Results ====
Country	W	L
Austria	4	0
Czech Republic	3	1
Hungary	2	2
Estonia	1	3
Spain	0	4

All times local

Draw 1 Saturday 5 December, 20:00

- Hungary 6, Spain 4
- Austria 8, Estonia 4

Draw 2 Sunday 6 December, 12:00

- Spain 8, Estonia 9

Draw 3 Sunday 6 December, 20:00

- Austria 6, Czech Republic 5

Draw 4 Monday 7 December, 08:00

- Spain 2, Czech Republic 7

Draw 5 Monday 7 December, 16:00

- Estonia 3, Hungary 7

Draw 6 Tuesday 8 December, 08:00

- Czech Republic 9, Hungary 6

Draw 7 Tuesday 8 December, 16:00

- Spain 2, Austria 6

Draw 8 Wednesday 9 December, 12:00

- Czech Republic 17, Estonia 1
- Hungary 4, Austria 5

=== Group B Playoffs ===
Page playoff system
1	Netherlands	7
2	Austria	6
3	Latvia	8
4	Czech Republic	7

Semifinal
2	Austria	4
3	Latvia	5

Final
1	Netherlands	6
3	Latvia	7

Netherlands and Latvia advance to the A-Group

=== World Challenge Games ===
Friday 11 December, 19:00

- Finland 4, Latvia 6

Saturday 12 December, 08:00

- Latvia 6, Finland 3
