= Cyrille Prunet =

French male curler

- Curler ♂

Team
- Curling club: Club de sports Megève, Megève

Curling career
- Member Association: France
- World Championship: 1 (2000)
- European Championship: 7 (1993, 1996, 1997, 1998, 1999, 2001, 2004)
- Other appearances: World Junior Championships: 3 (1993, 1994, 1995)
Medal record
Curling

Cyrille Prunet is a French curler.

== Teams ==
Season	Skip	Third	Second	Lead	Alternate	Coach	Events
1992–93	Spencer Mugnier	Thomas Dufour	Sylvain Ducroz	Philippe Caux	Cyrille Prunet		WJCC 1993 (bronze)
1993–94	Jan Henri Ducroz	Christian Dupont-Roc	Lionel Tournier	Cyrille Prunet	Thierry Mercier		ECC 1993 (6th)
1993–94	Spencer Mugnier	Thomas Dufour	Sylvain Ducroz	Philippe Caux	Cyrille Prunet		WJCC 1994 (7th)
1994–95	Cyrille Prunet	Eric Laffin	Vincent Lefebvre	Mathias Guenoun	Philippe Caux		WJCC 1995 (10th)
1996–97	Jan Henri Ducroz	Spencer Mugnier	Thomas Dufour	Lionel Tournier	Cyrille Prunet		ECC 1996 (13th)
1997–98	Jan Henri Ducroz	Spencer Mugnier	Thomas Dufour	Cyrille Prunet	Lionel Tournier	Raymond Ducroz	ECC 1997 (11th)
1998–99	Jan Henri Ducroz	Spencer Mugnier	Thomas Dufour	Lionel Tournier	Cyrille Prunet	Maurice Dupont-Roc, Andrée Dupont-Roc	ECC 1998 (13th)
1999–00	Thierry Mercier	Cyrille Prunet	Eric Laffin	Gerard Ravello	Lionel Tournier		ECC 1999 (7th); WCC 2000 (9th)
2001–02	Thierry Mercier	Cyrille Prunet	Eric Laffin	Lionel Tournier			ECC 2001 (7th)
2004–05	Thierry Mercier	Cyrille Prunet	Eric Laffin	Jérémy Frarier	Thomas Dufour	Robert Biondina	ECC 2004 (10th)
