= Jérémy Frarier =

French curler (born 1981)

- Curler ♂
- Born: 12 February 1981 (age 45)

Team
- Curling club: Megève CC, Megève

Curling career
- Member Association: France
- World Championship: 1 (2012)
- European Championship: 4 (2004, 2011, 2012, 2018)
- Other appearances: World Junior Championships: 1 (2001), World Junior-B Championships: 2 (2001, 2002)

Jérémy Frarier (born 12 February 1981) is a French curler.

== Teams ==
Season	Skip	Third	Second	Lead	Alternate	Coach	Events
2000–01	Richard Ducroz	Raphaël Mathieu	Julien Charlet	Tony Angiboust	Jérémy Frarier	Thomas Dufour	WJCC 2001 (10th)
2001–02	Jérémy Frarier	Vincent Artico	Benjamin Frarier	Cyril Roux	Adrien Bredannaz		WJBCC 2002 (4th)
2004–05	Thierry Mercier	Cyrille Prunet	Eric Laffin	Jérémy Frarier	Thomas Dufour	Robert Biondina	ECC 2004 (10th)
2011–12	Tony Angiboust (fourth)	Thomas Dufour (skip)	Lionel Roux	Wilfrid Coulot	Jérémy Frarier	Björn Schröder	ECC 2011 (8th); WCC 2012 (10th)
2012–13	Thomas Dufour	Lionel Roux	Wilfrid Coulot	Jérémy Frarier	Tony Angiboust	Björn Schröder, Alain Contat	ECC 2012 (8th)
2013–14	Tony Angiboust (fourth)	Thomas Dufour (skip)	Wilfrid Coulot	Jérémy Frarier	Romain Borini	Yannick Renggli	2013 OQE (7th)
2018–19	Jérémy Frarier (fourth)	Eddy Mercier (skip)	Quentin Morard	Killian Gaudin		Thierry Mercier	ECC 2018 (26th)
