= Anders Eriksson (Karlstad curler) =

Swedish male curler

- Curler ♂
- Born: 21 July 1982 (age 44)

Team
- Curling club: Karlstads CK, Karlstad, Östersunds CK, Östersund

Curling career
- Member Association: Sweden
- World Championship: 1 (2007)
- European Championship: 1 (2007)
- Other appearances: World Junior Curling Championships: 1 (2004)
Medal record
Curling
World Junior Championships
Gold medal – first place	2004 Trois-Rivières
Swedish Men's Championship
Gold medal – first place	2007

Erik Anders Eriksson (born 21 July 1982) is a Swedish curler.

== Teams ==
Season	Skip	Third	Second	Lead	Alternate	Coach	Events
2003–04	Niklas Edin	Nils Carlsén	Jörgen Granberg	Fredrik Lindberg	Anders Eriksson	Rickard Hallström	WJCC 2004 (gold)
2005–06	Anders Eriksson (fourth)	Sebastian Kraupp (skip)	Viktor Kjäll	Oskar Eriksson			
2006–07	Peja Lindholm	James Dryburgh	Viktor Kjäll	Anders Eriksson	Magnus Swartling (WCC)	Stefan Hasselborg	SMCC 2007 (gold); WCC 2007 (5th)
2007–08	Peja Lindholm	James Dryburgh	Viktor Kjäll	Anders Eriksson	Magnus Ekdahl	Marie Henriksson	ECC 2007 (6th)
2008–09	Anders Eriksson	Markus Eriksson	Henric Jonsson	Marcus Franzén	Nils Karlsson		SMCC 2009 (5th)
2009–10	Markus Eriksson	Anders Eriksson	Henric Jonsson	Marcus Franzén	Nils Karlsson		SMCC 2010 (9th)
2011–12	Göran Carlsson	Anders Eriksson	Albin Eriksson	Nils Sollerud	Petter Berg		

== Personal life ==
Anders Eriksson is from a family of Swedish curlers: one of his brothers is well-known curler Oskar Eriksson, who curls for Team Niklas Edin, Olympic and World Champion; another of his brothers is curler Markus Eriksson, 2014 World Men's silver medallist.
