= 2007 World Men's Curling Championship =

- Host city: Edmonton, Alberta, Canada
- Arena: Rexall Place
- Dates: March 31 – April 8, 2007
- Attendance: 184,970
- Winner: Canada
- Curling club: Coldwater & District CC, Coldwater
- Skip: Glenn Howard
- Third: Richard Hart
- Second: Brent Laing
- Lead: Craig Savill
- Alternate: Steve Bice
- Coach: Scott Taylor
- Finalist: Germany (Andy Kapp)

The 2007 World Men's Curling Championship (branded as 2007 Ford World Men's Curling Championship for sponsorship reasons) was held at Rexall Place in Edmonton, Alberta, Canada from March 31 to April 8. Team Canada skipped by Glenn Howard won the gold medal over Germany's Andy Kapp by a score of 8-3. This was Howard's third world championship, and his first as skip. Kapp claimed the silver for the second time in his career, and Team USA (skipped by Todd Birr) won the bronze medal, the first medal for the USA at the men's world championship since 1993.

The total attendance for the event was 184,970, a world championship record.

== Teams ==
| Australia | Canada | Denmark |
|---|---|---|
| Australia Curling Club Fourth: Ian Palangio; Skip: Hugh Millikin*; Second: Sean Hall; Lead: Mike Woloschuk; Alternate: David Imlah (*Throws third rocks) | Coldwater & District CC, Coldwater Skip: Glenn Howard; Third: Richard Hart; Second: Brent Laing; Lead: Craig Savill; Alternate: Steve Bice | Hvidovre CC, Hvidovre Skip: Johnny Frederiksen; Third: Lars Vilandt; Second: Bo Jensen; Lead: Kenneth Hertsdahl; Alternate: Ivan Frederiksen |
| Finland | France | Germany |
| Oulunkylän Curlinghalli, Helsinki Skip: Markku Uusipaavalniemi; Third: Kalle Kiiskinen; Second: Jani Sullanmaa; Lead: Teemu Salo; Alternate: Jari Rouvinen | Chamonix CC, Chamonix Skip: Thomas Dufour; Third: Tony Angiboust; Second: Jan Ducroz; Lead: Richard Ducroz; Alternate: Rafi Mathieu | CC Füssen, Füssen Skip: Andy Kapp; Third: Uli Kapp; Second: Andreas Lang; Lead: Andreas Kempf; Alternate: Holger Höhne |
| South Korea | Norway | Scotland |
| Gangwon Docheong, Chuncheon Skip: Lee Jae-ho; Third: Beak Jong-chul; Second: Yang Se-young; Lead: Kwon Young-il; Alternate: Park Kwon-il | Snarøen CC, Bærum Skip: Thomas Ulsrud; Third: Torger Nergård; Second: Thomas Due; Lead: Jan Thoresen; Alternate: Thomas Løvold | Perth CC, Perth Skip: Warwick Smith; Third: Craig Wilson; Second: David Smith; Lead: Ross Hepburn; Alternate: Ewan MacDonald |
| Sweden | Switzerland | United States |
| Östersunds CK, Östersund Skip: Peja Lindholm; Third: James Dryburgh; Second: Viktor Kjäll; Lead: Anders Eriksson; Alternate: Magnus Swartling | CC St. Galler Bär, St. Gallen Skip: Ralph Stöckli; Third: Jan Hauser; Second: Markus Eggler; Lead: Simon Strübin; Alternate: Andreas Schwaller | Caledonian CC, Mankato & Appleton CC, Appleton Skip: Todd Birr; Third: Bill Todhunter; Second: Greg Johnson; Lead: Kevin Birr; Alternate: Zach Jacobson |

== Round-robin standings ==
Final round-robin standings

Key
| Teams to Playoffs |
| Teams to Tiebreaker |

| Country | Skip | W | L | PF | PA | Ends Won | Ends Lost | Blank Ends | Stolen Ends | Shot Pct. |
|---|---|---|---|---|---|---|---|---|---|---|
| Canada | Glenn Howard | 10 | 1 | 93 | 40 | 51 | 33 | 10 | 16 | 91% |
| United States | Todd Birr | 8 | 3 | 69 | 57 | 49 | 36 | 22 | 16 | 83% |
| Switzerland | Ralph Stöckli | 7 | 4 | 73 | 65 | 44 | 41 | 20 | 8 | 84% |
| Sweden | Peja Lindholm | 6 | 5 | 66 | 64 | 43 | 48 | 17 | 8 | 81% |
| Germany | Andy Kapp | 6 | 5 | 71 | 64 | 51 | 41 | 11 | 14 | 83% |
| Finland | Markku Uusipaavalniemi | 6 | 5 | 72 | 61 | 41 | 42 | 19 | 7 | 83% |
| France | Thomas Dufour | 6 | 5 | 71 | 74 | 41 | 44 | 13 | 11 | 77% |
| Norway | Thomas Ulsrud | 4 | 7 | 61 | 69 | 46 | 44 | 14 | 11 | 84% |
| Scotland | Warwick Smith | 4 | 7 | 59 | 69 | 40 | 42 | 19 | 3 | 83% |
| Australia | Hugh Millikin | 4 | 7 | 66 | 74 | 45 | 45 | 14 | 8 | 80% |
| Denmark | Johnny Frederiksen | 4 | 7 | 56 | 85 | 38 | 50 | 9 | 4 | 78% |
| South Korea | Lee Jae-ho | 1 | 10 | 44 | 79 | 29 | 49 | 26 | 6 | 79% |

== Round-robin results ==
=== Draw 1 ===
March 31, 12:30

| Sheet A | 1 | 2 | 3 | 4 | 5 | 6 | 7 | 8 | 9 | 10 | 11 | Final |
|---|---|---|---|---|---|---|---|---|---|---|---|---|
| Sweden (Lindholm) 🔨 | 0 | 0 | 2 | 0 | 0 | 2 | 0 | 2 | 1 | 0 | 0 | 7 |
| Denmark (Frederiksen) | 0 | 0 | 0 | 1 | 2 | 0 | 2 | 0 | 0 | 2 | 1 | 8 |

| Sheet B | 1 | 2 | 3 | 4 | 5 | 6 | 7 | 8 | 9 | 10 | Final |
|---|---|---|---|---|---|---|---|---|---|---|---|
| Australia (Millikin) 🔨 | 1 | 0 | 1 | 0 | 1 | 0 | 0 | 0 | 2 | 1 | 6 |
| United States (Birr) | 0 | 2 | 0 | 1 | 0 | 0 | 1 | 1 | 0 | 0 | 5 |

| Sheet C | 1 | 2 | 3 | 4 | 5 | 6 | 7 | 8 | 9 | 10 | 11 | Final |
|---|---|---|---|---|---|---|---|---|---|---|---|---|
| Switzerland (Stöckli) | 0 | 2 | 0 | 0 | 2 | 0 | 0 | 1 | 0 | 1 | 0 | 6 |
| Norway (Ulsrud) 🔨 | 1 | 0 | 2 | 0 | 0 | 1 | 1 | 0 | 1 | 0 | 1 | 7 |

| Sheet D | 1 | 2 | 3 | 4 | 5 | 6 | 7 | 8 | 9 | 10 | Final |
|---|---|---|---|---|---|---|---|---|---|---|---|
| Canada (Howard) | 0 | 2 | 1 | 0 | 2 | 1 | 1 | 0 | X | X | 7 |
| Finland (Uusipaavalniemi) 🔨 | 1 | 0 | 0 | 1 | 0 | 0 | 0 | 1 | X | X | 3 |

=== Draw 2 ===
March 31, 18:00

| Sheet A | 1 | 2 | 3 | 4 | 5 | 6 | 7 | 8 | 9 | 10 | Final |
|---|---|---|---|---|---|---|---|---|---|---|---|
| Norway (Ulsrud) | 0 | 0 | 0 | 2 | 0 | 2 | 0 | 2 | 1 | X | 7 |
| Australia (Millikin) 🔨 | 0 | 0 | 1 | 0 | 1 | 0 | 2 | 0 | 0 | X | 4 |

| Sheet B | 1 | 2 | 3 | 4 | 5 | 6 | 7 | 8 | 9 | 10 | Final |
|---|---|---|---|---|---|---|---|---|---|---|---|
| Scotland (Smith) 🔨 | 0 | 0 | 1 | 0 | 2 | 1 | 0 | 0 | 2 | 0 | 6 |
| South Korea (Lee) | 0 | 0 | 0 | 2 | 0 | 0 | 0 | 2 | 0 | 1 | 5 |

| Sheet C | 1 | 2 | 3 | 4 | 5 | 6 | 7 | 8 | 9 | 10 | Final |
|---|---|---|---|---|---|---|---|---|---|---|---|
| France (Dufour) | 0 | 0 | 0 | 0 | 0 | 0 | 2 | X | X | X | 2 |
| Germany (Kapp) 🔨 | 2 | 1 | 1 | 1 | 4 | 1 | 0 | X | X | X | 10 |

| Sheet D | 1 | 2 | 3 | 4 | 5 | 6 | 7 | 8 | 9 | 10 | Final |
|---|---|---|---|---|---|---|---|---|---|---|---|
| Switzerland (Stöckli) 🔨 | 2 | 0 | 0 | 1 | 0 | 2 | 0 | 2 | 0 | 2 | 9 |
| United States (Birr) | 0 | 1 | 1 | 0 | 0 | 0 | 2 | 0 | 2 | 0 | 6 |

=== Draw 3 ===
April 1, 08:30

| Sheet B | 1 | 2 | 3 | 4 | 5 | 6 | 7 | 8 | 9 | 10 | Final |
|---|---|---|---|---|---|---|---|---|---|---|---|
| Finland (Uusipaavalniemi) | 1 | 0 | 0 | 1 | 1 | 0 | 0 | 0 | 1 | 0 | 4 |
| Sweden (Lindholm) 🔨 | 0 | 1 | 1 | 0 | 0 | 2 | 1 | 0 | 0 | 1 | 6 |

| Sheet C | 1 | 2 | 3 | 4 | 5 | 6 | 7 | 8 | 9 | 10 | Final |
|---|---|---|---|---|---|---|---|---|---|---|---|
| Canada (Howard) 🔨 | 2 | 1 | 1 | 0 | 1 | 0 | 2 | 0 | 1 | X | 8 |
| Denmark (Frederiksen) | 0 | 0 | 0 | 1 | 0 | 2 | 0 | 1 | 0 | X | 4 |

=== Draw 4 ===
April 1, 13:00

| Sheet A | 1 | 2 | 3 | 4 | 5 | 6 | 7 | 8 | 9 | 10 | Final |
|---|---|---|---|---|---|---|---|---|---|---|---|
| South Korea (Lee) 🔨 | 0 | 1 | 2 | 1 | 1 | 0 | 0 | 0 | 0 | 0 | 5 |
| France (Dufour) | 0 | 0 | 0 | 0 | 0 | 0 | 1 | 2 | 1 | 2 | 6 |

| Sheet B | 1 | 2 | 3 | 4 | 5 | 6 | 7 | 8 | 9 | 10 | Final |
|---|---|---|---|---|---|---|---|---|---|---|---|
| United States (Birr) | 0 | 0 | 1 | 1 | 2 | 1 | 0 | 1 | 0 | 1 | 7 |
| Norway (Ulsrud) 🔨 | 0 | 0 | 0 | 0 | 0 | 0 | 1 | 0 | 2 | 0 | 3 |

| Sheet C | 1 | 2 | 3 | 4 | 5 | 6 | 7 | 8 | 9 | 10 | Final |
|---|---|---|---|---|---|---|---|---|---|---|---|
| Australia (Millikin) 🔨 | 0 | 1 | 0 | 1 | 0 | 0 | 2 | 0 | 3 | 0 | 7 |
| Switzerland (Stöckli) | 0 | 0 | 2 | 0 | 3 | 0 | 0 | 1 | 0 | 3 | 9 |

| Sheet D | 1 | 2 | 3 | 4 | 5 | 6 | 7 | 8 | 9 | 10 | Final |
|---|---|---|---|---|---|---|---|---|---|---|---|
| Scotland (Smith) 🔨 | 2 | 0 | 1 | 0 | 1 | 0 | 0 | 0 | 1 | 0 | 5 |
| Germany (Kapp) | 0 | 2 | 0 | 2 | 0 | 1 | 1 | 0 | 0 | 2 | 8 |

=== Draw 5 ===
April 1, 19:30

| Sheet A | 1 | 2 | 3 | 4 | 5 | 6 | 7 | 8 | 9 | 10 | Final |
|---|---|---|---|---|---|---|---|---|---|---|---|
| Denmark (Frederiksen) 🔨 | 1 | 0 | 0 | 1 | 0 | 0 | 0 | 1 | 0 | X | 3 |
| Finland (Uusipaavalniemi) | 0 | 2 | 1 | 0 | 2 | 0 | 2 | 0 | 1 | X | 8 |

| Sheet B | 1 | 2 | 3 | 4 | 5 | 6 | 7 | 8 | 9 | 10 | Final |
|---|---|---|---|---|---|---|---|---|---|---|---|
| France (Dufour) 🔨 | 1 | 0 | 3 | 0 | 2 | 0 | 1 | 0 | 1 | 0 | 8 |
| Scotland (Smith) | 0 | 2 | 0 | 2 | 0 | 1 | 0 | 1 | 0 | 3 | 9 |

| Sheet C | 1 | 2 | 3 | 4 | 5 | 6 | 7 | 8 | 9 | 10 | Final |
|---|---|---|---|---|---|---|---|---|---|---|---|
| Germany (Kapp) 🔨 | 0 | 0 | 2 | 1 | 1 | 0 | 2 | 0 | 0 | 1 | 7 |
| South Korea (Lee) | 0 | 0 | 0 | 0 | 0 | 2 | 0 | 3 | 0 | 0 | 5 |

| Sheet D | 1 | 2 | 3 | 4 | 5 | 6 | 7 | 8 | 9 | 10 | Final |
|---|---|---|---|---|---|---|---|---|---|---|---|
| Sweden (Lindholm) 🔨 | 1 | 0 | 0 | 0 | 1 | 0 | 0 | 2 | 0 | X | 4 |
| Canada (Howard) | 0 | 1 | 1 | 1 | 0 | 1 | 2 | 0 | 2 | X | 8 |

=== Draw 6 ===
April 2, 08:30

| Sheet A | 1 | 2 | 3 | 4 | 5 | 6 | 7 | 8 | 9 | 10 | Final |
|---|---|---|---|---|---|---|---|---|---|---|---|
| Canada (Howard) | 0 | 0 | 0 | 2 | 2 | 0 | 1 | 0 | 3 | X | 8 |
| Switzerland (Stöckli) 🔨 | 0 | 0 | 1 | 0 | 0 | 0 | 0 | 1 | 0 | X | 2 |

| Sheet B | 1 | 2 | 3 | 4 | 5 | 6 | 7 | 8 | 9 | 10 | Final |
|---|---|---|---|---|---|---|---|---|---|---|---|
| Finland (Uusipaavalniemi) 🔨 | 2 | 0 | 2 | 0 | 1 | 0 | 4 | 0 | 0 | 1 | 10 |
| Australia (Millikin) | 0 | 2 | 0 | 2 | 0 | 2 | 0 | 0 | 3 | 0 | 9 |

| Sheet C | 1 | 2 | 3 | 4 | 5 | 6 | 7 | 8 | 9 | 10 | Final |
|---|---|---|---|---|---|---|---|---|---|---|---|
| Sweden (Lindholm) | 0 | 0 | 1 | 0 | 2 | 1 | 0 | 3 | 0 | X | 7 |
| Norway (Ulsrud) 🔨 | 1 | 0 | 0 | 0 | 0 | 0 | 1 | 0 | 1 | X | 3 |

| Sheet D | 1 | 2 | 3 | 4 | 5 | 6 | 7 | 8 | 9 | 10 | Final |
|---|---|---|---|---|---|---|---|---|---|---|---|
| Denmark (Frederiksen) | 0 | 0 | 1 | 0 | 0 | 0 | X | X | X | X | 1 |
| United States (Birr) 🔨 | 0 | 2 | 0 | 2 | 2 | 3 | X | X | X | X | 9 |

=== Draw 7 ===
April 2, 13:00

| Sheet A | 1 | 2 | 3 | 4 | 5 | 6 | 7 | 8 | 9 | 10 | Final |
|---|---|---|---|---|---|---|---|---|---|---|---|
| Australia (Millikin) | 0 | 0 | 0 | 1 | 1 | 0 | 1 | 0 | 4 | 0 | 7 |
| Germany (Kapp) 🔨 | 2 | 1 | 0 | 0 | 0 | 1 | 0 | 1 | 0 | 1 | 6 |

| Sheet B | 1 | 2 | 3 | 4 | 5 | 6 | 7 | 8 | 9 | 10 | Final |
|---|---|---|---|---|---|---|---|---|---|---|---|
| Switzerland (Stöckli) | 1 | 0 | 2 | 2 | 0 | 1 | 0 | 0 | 1 | X | 7 |
| South Korea (Lee) 🔨 | 0 | 0 | 0 | 0 | 1 | 0 | 1 | 0 | 0 | X | 2 |

| Sheet C | 1 | 2 | 3 | 4 | 5 | 6 | 7 | 8 | 9 | 10 | Final |
|---|---|---|---|---|---|---|---|---|---|---|---|
| United States (Birr) | 0 | 0 | 0 | 0 | 0 | 1 | 0 | 1 | 0 | 0 | 2 |
| France (Dufour) 🔨 | 0 | 0 | 0 | 2 | 0 | 0 | 0 | 0 | 3 | 1 | 6 |

| Sheet D | 1 | 2 | 3 | 4 | 5 | 6 | 7 | 8 | 9 | 10 | Final |
|---|---|---|---|---|---|---|---|---|---|---|---|
| Norway (Ulsrud) | 0 | 2 | 0 | 1 | 1 | 0 | 1 | 0 | 1 | X | 6 |
| Scotland (Smith) 🔨 | 1 | 0 | 1 | 0 | 0 | 0 | 0 | 0 | 0 | X | 2 |

=== Draw 8 ===
April 2, 18:00

| Sheet A | 1 | 2 | 3 | 4 | 5 | 6 | 7 | 8 | 9 | 10 | Final |
|---|---|---|---|---|---|---|---|---|---|---|---|
| Scotland (Smith) | 0 | 0 | 0 | 0 | 1 | 0 | 2 | 1 | 1 | 0 | 5 |
| Sweden (Lindholm) 🔨 | 0 | 2 | 1 | 0 | 0 | 3 | 0 | 0 | 0 | 1 | 7 |

| Sheet B | 1 | 2 | 3 | 4 | 5 | 6 | 7 | 8 | 9 | 10 | Final |
|---|---|---|---|---|---|---|---|---|---|---|---|
| France (Dufour) | 0 | 4 | 0 | 1 | 1 | 0 | 1 | 0 | X | X | 7 |
| Denmark (Frederiksen) 🔨 | 1 | 0 | 1 | 0 | 0 | 0 | 0 | 1 | X | X | 3 |

| Sheet C | 1 | 2 | 3 | 4 | 5 | 6 | 7 | 8 | 9 | 10 | Final |
|---|---|---|---|---|---|---|---|---|---|---|---|
| South Korea (Lee) | 0 | 0 | 0 | 0 | 0 | 0 | 0 | 0 | X | X | 0 |
| Canada (Howard) 🔨 | 2 | 1 | 2 | 0 | 3 | 1 | 0 | 3 | X | X | 12 |

| Sheet D | 1 | 2 | 3 | 4 | 5 | 6 | 7 | 8 | 9 | 10 | Final |
|---|---|---|---|---|---|---|---|---|---|---|---|
| Germany (Kapp) | 0 | 1 | 0 | 1 | 0 | 1 | 1 | 0 | 1 | 2 | 7 |
| Finland (Uusipaavalniemi) 🔨 | 2 | 0 | 2 | 0 | 1 | 0 | 0 | 1 | 0 | 0 | 6 |

=== Draw 9 ===
April 3, 08:30

| Sheet A | 1 | 2 | 3 | 4 | 5 | 6 | 7 | 8 | 9 | 10 | Final |
|---|---|---|---|---|---|---|---|---|---|---|---|
| South Korea (Lee) 🔨 | 0 | 0 | 1 | 0 | 2 | 0 | 1 | 0 | 2 | 0 | 6 |
| Denmark (Frederiksen) | 2 | 0 | 0 | 2 | 0 | 2 | 0 | 0 | 0 | 1 | 7 |

| Sheet B | 1 | 2 | 3 | 4 | 5 | 6 | 7 | 8 | 9 | 10 | Final |
|---|---|---|---|---|---|---|---|---|---|---|---|
| Germany (Kapp) 🔨 | 1 | 0 | 1 | 0 | 1 | 0 | 1 | 0 | 1 | 0 | 5 |
| Sweden (Lindholm) | 0 | 2 | 0 | 1 | 0 | 3 | 0 | 1 | 0 | 0 | 7 |

| Sheet C | 1 | 2 | 3 | 4 | 5 | 6 | 7 | 8 | 9 | 10 | Final |
|---|---|---|---|---|---|---|---|---|---|---|---|
| Scotland (Smith) | 0 | 0 | 0 | 0 | 0 | 0 | 1 | 0 | X | X | 1 |
| Finland (Uusipaavalniemi) 🔨 | 0 | 0 | 0 | 4 | 0 | 0 | 0 | 2 | X | X | 6 |

| Sheet D | 1 | 2 | 3 | 4 | 5 | 6 | 7 | 8 | 9 | 10 | Final |
|---|---|---|---|---|---|---|---|---|---|---|---|
| France (Dufour) | 0 | 1 | 0 | 2 | 0 | 2 | 0 | X | X | X | 5 |
| Canada (Howard) 🔨 | 2 | 0 | 4 | 0 | 3 | 0 | 3 | X | X | X | 12 |

=== Draw 10 ===
April 3, 13:00

| Sheet A | 1 | 2 | 3 | 4 | 5 | 6 | 7 | 8 | 9 | 10 | 11 | Final |
|---|---|---|---|---|---|---|---|---|---|---|---|---|
| Finland (Uusipaavalniemi) | 0 | 0 | 1 | 1 | 0 | 2 | 0 | 0 | 2 | 0 | 0 | 6 |
| United States (Birr) 🔨 | 0 | 3 | 0 | 0 | 1 | 0 | 0 | 1 | 0 | 1 | 1 | 7 |

| Sheet B | 1 | 2 | 3 | 4 | 5 | 6 | 7 | 8 | 9 | 10 | Final |
|---|---|---|---|---|---|---|---|---|---|---|---|
| Canada (Howard) | 0 | 2 | 0 | 2 | 0 | 0 | 2 | 0 | 2 | X | 8 |
| Norway (Ulsrud) 🔨 | 1 | 0 | 1 | 0 | 1 | 0 | 0 | 1 | 0 | X | 4 |

| Sheet C | 1 | 2 | 3 | 4 | 5 | 6 | 7 | 8 | 9 | 10 | Final |
|---|---|---|---|---|---|---|---|---|---|---|---|
| Denmark (Frederiksen) | 0 | 0 | 2 | 0 | 1 | 0 | 2 | 0 | 0 | X | 5 |
| Australia (Millikin) 🔨 | 1 | 1 | 0 | 2 | 0 | 2 | 0 | 2 | 1 | X | 9 |

| Sheet D | 1 | 2 | 3 | 4 | 5 | 6 | 7 | 8 | 9 | 10 | Final |
|---|---|---|---|---|---|---|---|---|---|---|---|
| Sweden (Lindholm) | 0 | 0 | 0 | 2 | 0 | 2 | 0 | 0 | 2 | 0 | 6 |
| Switzerland (Stöckli) 🔨 | 0 | 0 | 1 | 0 | 3 | 0 | 0 | 1 | 0 | 2 | 7 |

=== Draw 11 ===
April 3, 18:00

| Sheet A | 1 | 2 | 3 | 4 | 5 | 6 | 7 | 8 | 9 | 10 | Final |
|---|---|---|---|---|---|---|---|---|---|---|---|
| Norway (Ulsrud) | 0 | 0 | 2 | 0 | 1 | 2 | 1 | 0 | 1 | 0 | 7 |
| France (Dufour) 🔨 | 2 | 1 | 0 | 2 | 0 | 0 | 0 | 3 | 0 | 1 | 9 |

| Sheet B | 1 | 2 | 3 | 4 | 5 | 6 | 7 | 8 | 9 | 10 | Final |
|---|---|---|---|---|---|---|---|---|---|---|---|
| United States (Birr) 🔨 | 1 | 0 | 0 | 1 | 1 | 0 | 0 | 2 | 0 | 1 | 6 |
| Scotland (Smith) | 0 | 0 | 0 | 0 | 0 | 0 | 2 | 0 | 2 | 0 | 4 |

| Sheet C | 1 | 2 | 3 | 4 | 5 | 6 | 7 | 8 | 9 | 10 | Final |
|---|---|---|---|---|---|---|---|---|---|---|---|
| Switzerland (Stöckli) | 0 | 0 | 1 | 0 | 1 | 1 | 0 | 0 | 1 | X | 4 |
| Germany (Kapp) 🔨 | 0 | 1 | 0 | 2 | 0 | 0 | 3 | 1 | 0 | X | 7 |

| Sheet D | 1 | 2 | 3 | 4 | 5 | 6 | 7 | 8 | 9 | 10 | Final |
|---|---|---|---|---|---|---|---|---|---|---|---|
| Australia (Millikin) 🔨 | 0 | 0 | 1 | 0 | 0 | 0 | 2 | 0 | 2 | 1 | 6 |
| South Korea (Lee) | 0 | 0 | 0 | 2 | 1 | 2 | 0 | 2 | 0 | 0 | 7 |

=== Draw 12 ===
April 4, 08:30

| Sheet A | 1 | 2 | 3 | 4 | 5 | 6 | 7 | 8 | 9 | 10 | Final |
|---|---|---|---|---|---|---|---|---|---|---|---|
| Switzerland (Stöckli) | 1 | 0 | 2 | 0 | 0 | 1 | 0 | 2 | 0 | X | 6 |
| Scotland (Smith) 🔨 | 0 | 1 | 0 | 1 | 0 | 0 | 1 | 0 | 1 | X | 4 |

| Sheet B | 1 | 2 | 3 | 4 | 5 | 6 | 7 | 8 | 9 | 10 | Final |
|---|---|---|---|---|---|---|---|---|---|---|---|
| Australia (Millikin) | 0 | 0 | 1 | 0 | 1 | 0 | 0 | 0 | 1 | X | 3 |
| France (Dufour) 🔨 | 0 | 0 | 0 | 1 | 0 | 3 | 1 | 2 | 0 | X | 7 |

| Sheet C | 1 | 2 | 3 | 4 | 5 | 6 | 7 | 8 | 9 | 10 | Final |
|---|---|---|---|---|---|---|---|---|---|---|---|
| Norway (Ulsrud) 🔨 | 2 | 0 | 0 | 0 | 2 | 2 | 1 | 0 | X | X | 7 |
| South Korea (Lee) | 0 | 0 | 0 | 1 | 0 | 0 | 0 | 1 | X | X | 2 |

| Sheet D | 1 | 2 | 3 | 4 | 5 | 6 | 7 | 8 | 9 | 10 | Final |
|---|---|---|---|---|---|---|---|---|---|---|---|
| United States (Birr) 🔨 | 0 | 2 | 1 | 1 | 0 | 1 | 0 | 1 | 0 | 1 | 7 |
| Germany (Kapp) | 0 | 0 | 0 | 0 | 2 | 0 | 1 | 0 | 3 | 0 | 6 |

=== Draw 13 ===
April 4, 13:00

| Sheet A | 1 | 2 | 3 | 4 | 5 | 6 | 7 | 8 | 9 | 10 | Final |
|---|---|---|---|---|---|---|---|---|---|---|---|
| Germany (Kapp) | 0 | 1 | 0 | 1 | 0 | 1 | 0 | X | X | X | 3 |
| Canada (Howard) 🔨 | 2 | 0 | 2 | 0 | 2 | 0 | 3 | X | X | X | 9 |

| Sheet B | 1 | 2 | 3 | 4 | 5 | 6 | 7 | 8 | 9 | 10 | Final |
|---|---|---|---|---|---|---|---|---|---|---|---|
| South Korea (Lee) | 0 | 0 | 0 | 1 | 0 | 0 | 0 | 0 | X | X | 1 |
| Finland (Uusipaavalniemi) 🔨 | 2 | 0 | 0 | 0 | 0 | 0 | 4 | 1 | X | X | 7 |

| Sheet C | 1 | 2 | 3 | 4 | 5 | 6 | 7 | 8 | 9 | 10 | Final |
|---|---|---|---|---|---|---|---|---|---|---|---|
| France (Dufour) | 0 | 1 | 0 | 2 | 0 | 1 | 0 | 1 | 0 | 0 | 5 |
| Sweden (Lindholm) 🔨 | 0 | 0 | 1 | 0 | 3 | 0 | 2 | 0 | 0 | 1 | 7 |

| Sheet D | 1 | 2 | 3 | 4 | 5 | 6 | 7 | 8 | 9 | 10 | Final |
|---|---|---|---|---|---|---|---|---|---|---|---|
| Scotland (Smith) | 0 | 4 | 0 | 1 | 0 | 2 | 0 | 4 | X | X | 11 |
| Denmark (Frederiksen) 🔨 | 1 | 0 | 2 | 0 | 1 | 0 | 1 | 0 | X | X | 5 |

=== Draw 14 ===
April 4, 19:30

| Sheet A | 1 | 2 | 3 | 4 | 5 | 6 | 7 | 8 | 9 | 10 | Final |
|---|---|---|---|---|---|---|---|---|---|---|---|
| Sweden (Lindholm) 🔨 | 0 | 1 | 0 | 1 | 0 | 0 | 1 | 0 | 0 | X | 3 |
| Australia (Millikin) | 0 | 0 | 2 | 0 | 1 | 2 | 0 | 1 | 1 | X | 7 |

| Sheet B | 1 | 2 | 3 | 4 | 5 | 6 | 7 | 8 | 9 | 10 | Final |
|---|---|---|---|---|---|---|---|---|---|---|---|
| Denmark (Frederiksen) | 0 | 2 | 0 | 0 | 1 | 0 | 1 | 0 | X | X | 4 |
| Switzerland (Stöckli) 🔨 | 1 | 0 | 2 | 2 | 0 | 2 | 0 | 3 | X | X | 10 |

| Sheet C | 1 | 2 | 3 | 4 | 5 | 6 | 7 | 8 | 9 | 10 | Final |
|---|---|---|---|---|---|---|---|---|---|---|---|
| Canada (Howard) 🔨 | 2 | 0 | 0 | 0 | 1 | 0 | 2 | 0 | 1 | 0 | 6 |
| United States (Birr) | 0 | 0 | 1 | 0 | 0 | 2 | 0 | 1 | 0 | 3 | 7 |

| Sheet D | 1 | 2 | 3 | 4 | 5 | 6 | 7 | 8 | 9 | 10 | Final |
|---|---|---|---|---|---|---|---|---|---|---|---|
| Finland (Uusipaavalniemi) | 0 | 0 | 3 | 0 | 3 | 0 | 1 | 0 | 0 | 1 | 8 |
| Norway (Ulsrud) 🔨 | 2 | 0 | 0 | 1 | 0 | 1 | 0 | 2 | 1 | 0 | 7 |

=== Draw 15 ===
April 5, 08:30

| Sheet A | 1 | 2 | 3 | 4 | 5 | 6 | 7 | 8 | 9 | 10 | Final |
|---|---|---|---|---|---|---|---|---|---|---|---|
| United States (Birr) | 1 | 1 | 0 | 0 | 0 | 2 | 0 | 2 | 0 | 1 | 7 |
| South Korea (Lee) 🔨 | 0 | 0 | 1 | 0 | 0 | 0 | 2 | 0 | 2 | 0 | 5 |

| Sheet B | 1 | 2 | 3 | 4 | 5 | 6 | 7 | 8 | 9 | 10 | Final |
|---|---|---|---|---|---|---|---|---|---|---|---|
| Norway (Ulsrud) | 0 | 2 | 0 | 0 | 0 | 1 | 0 | 0 | 2 | 0 | 5 |
| Germany (Kapp) 🔨 | 1 | 0 | 1 | 1 | 0 | 0 | 1 | 1 | 0 | 2 | 7 |

| Sheet C | 1 | 2 | 3 | 4 | 5 | 6 | 7 | 8 | 9 | 10 | Final |
|---|---|---|---|---|---|---|---|---|---|---|---|
| Australia (Millikin) | 0 | 1 | 0 | 1 | 0 | 0 | 2 | 0 | 1 | 0 | 5 |
| Scotland (Smith) 🔨 | 1 | 0 | 2 | 0 | 0 | 1 | 0 | 1 | 0 | 2 | 7 |

| Sheet D | 1 | 2 | 3 | 4 | 5 | 6 | 7 | 8 | 9 | 10 | Final |
|---|---|---|---|---|---|---|---|---|---|---|---|
| Switzerland (Stöckli) 🔨 | 1 | 0 | 0 | 3 | 0 | 1 | 1 | 0 | 0 | X | 6 |
| France (Dufour) | 0 | 1 | 3 | 0 | 1 | 0 | 0 | 0 | 5 | X | 10 |

=== Draw 16 ===
April 5, 13:00

| Sheet A | 1 | 2 | 3 | 4 | 5 | 6 | 7 | 8 | 9 | 10 | Final |
|---|---|---|---|---|---|---|---|---|---|---|---|
| Denmark (Frederiksen) 🔨 | 1 | 0 | 1 | 0 | 3 | 0 | 0 | 4 | 0 | X | 9 |
| Norway (Ulsrud) | 0 | 1 | 0 | 1 | 0 | 1 | 1 | 0 | 1 | X | 5 |

| Sheet B | 1 | 2 | 3 | 4 | 5 | 6 | 7 | 8 | 9 | 10 | Final |
|---|---|---|---|---|---|---|---|---|---|---|---|
| Sweden (Lindholm) | 1 | 0 | 0 | 0 | 1 | 0 | 1 | 0 | 2 | 0 | 5 |
| United States (Birr) 🔨 | 0 | 0 | 2 | 0 | 0 | 2 | 0 | 1 | 0 | 1 | 6 |

| Sheet C | 1 | 2 | 3 | 4 | 5 | 6 | 7 | 8 | 9 | 10 | Final |
|---|---|---|---|---|---|---|---|---|---|---|---|
| Finland (Uusipaavalniemi) 🔨 | 2 | 0 | 0 | 1 | 0 | 0 | 1 | 0 | 0 | X | 4 |
| Switzerland (Stöckli) | 0 | 0 | 3 | 0 | 0 | 2 | 0 | 2 | 0 | X | 7 |

| Sheet D | 1 | 2 | 3 | 4 | 5 | 6 | 7 | 8 | 9 | 10 | Final |
|---|---|---|---|---|---|---|---|---|---|---|---|
| Canada (Howard) | 0 | 2 | 0 | 2 | 1 | 0 | 0 | 3 | X | X | 8 |
| Australia (Millikin) 🔨 | 1 | 0 | 1 | 0 | 0 | 1 | 0 | 0 | X | X | 3 |

=== Draw 17 ===
April 5, 18:00

| Sheet A | 1 | 2 | 3 | 4 | 5 | 6 | 7 | 8 | 9 | 10 | Final |
|---|---|---|---|---|---|---|---|---|---|---|---|
| France (Dufour) 🔨 | 1 | 0 | 0 | 2 | 0 | 2 | 0 | 1 | X | X | 6 |
| Finland (Uusipaavalniemi) | 0 | 3 | 2 | 0 | 2 | 0 | 3 | 0 | X | X | 10 |

| Sheet B | 1 | 2 | 3 | 4 | 5 | 6 | 7 | 8 | 9 | 10 | Final |
|---|---|---|---|---|---|---|---|---|---|---|---|
| Scotland (Smith) 🔨 | 1 | 0 | 1 | 0 | 1 | 0 | 0 | 1 | 0 | 1 | 5 |
| Canada (Howard) | 0 | 2 | 0 | 1 | 0 | 0 | 3 | 0 | 1 | 0 | 7 |

| Sheet C | 1 | 2 | 3 | 4 | 5 | 6 | 7 | 8 | 9 | 10 | Final |
|---|---|---|---|---|---|---|---|---|---|---|---|
| Germany (Kapp) | 0 | 2 | 0 | 0 | 2 | 0 | 1 | 0 | 0 | 0 | 5 |
| Denmark (Frederiksen) 🔨 | 1 | 0 | 2 | 0 | 0 | 2 | 0 | 1 | 0 | 1 | 7 |

| Sheet D | 1 | 2 | 3 | 4 | 5 | 6 | 7 | 8 | 9 | 10 | Final |
|---|---|---|---|---|---|---|---|---|---|---|---|
| South Korea (Lee) 🔨 | 3 | 0 | 1 | 0 | 0 | 1 | 0 | 0 | 1 | 0 | 6 |
| Sweden (Lindholm) | 0 | 2 | 0 | 2 | 1 | 0 | 0 | 1 | 0 | 1 | 7 |

== Tiebreaker ==
=== Tie breaker 1 ===
April 6, 9:00

| Sheet B | 1 | 2 | 3 | 4 | 5 | 6 | 7 | 8 | 9 | 10 | Final |
|---|---|---|---|---|---|---|---|---|---|---|---|
| France (Dufour) 🔨 | 1 | 0 | 1 | 0 | 0 | 1 | 0 | 2 | 0 | 0 | 5 |
| Sweden (Lindholm) | 0 | 1 | 0 | 1 | 0 | 0 | 2 | 0 | 0 | 2 | 6 |

Player Percentages
| France | | Sweden | |
|---|---|---|---|
| Richard Ducroz | 84% | Anders Eriksson | 83% |
| Jan Ducroz | 74% | Viktor Kjäll | 74% |
| Tony Angiboust | 81% | James Dryburgh | 75% |
| Thomas Dufour | 83% | Peja Lindholm | 84% |
| Total | 80% | Total | 79% |

| Sheet D | 1 | 2 | 3 | 4 | 5 | 6 | 7 | 8 | 9 | 10 | Final |
|---|---|---|---|---|---|---|---|---|---|---|---|
| Germany (Kapp) | 0 | 2 | 0 | 0 | 2 | 0 | 0 | 2 | 0 | 2 | 8 |
| Finland (Uusipaavalniemi) 🔨 | 1 | 0 | 0 | 1 | 0 | 2 | 1 | 0 | 0 | 0 | 5 |

Player Percentages
| Germany | | Finland | |
|---|---|---|---|
| Andreas Kempf | 88% | Teemu Salo | 88% |
| Andreas Lang | 64% | Jani Sullanmaa | 80% |
| Uli Kapp | 94% | Kalle Kiiskinen | 75% |
| Andy Kapp | 88% | Markku Uusipaavalniemi | 76% |
| Total | 83% | Total | 80% |

=== Tie breaker 2 ===
April 6, 14:00

| Sheet C | 1 | 2 | 3 | 4 | 5 | 6 | 7 | 8 | 9 | 10 | Final |
|---|---|---|---|---|---|---|---|---|---|---|---|
| Germany (Kapp) 🔨 | 2 | 0 | 0 | 1 | 0 | 2 | 0 | 2 | 1 | X | 8 |
| Sweden (Lindholm) | 0 | 1 | 1 | 0 | 1 | 0 | 1 | 0 | 0 | X | 4 |

Player Percentages
| Germany | | Sweden | |
|---|---|---|---|
| Holger Höhne | 88% | Anders Eriksson | 89% |
| Andreas Lang | 89% | Viktor Kjäll | 88% |
| Uli Kapp | 88% | James Dryburgh | 83% |
| Andy Kapp | 89% | Peja Lindholm | 75% |
| Total | 88% | Total | 84% |

== Playoffs ==
Page playoff system
1 | Canada | 7
2 | United States | 2
3 | Switzerland | 4
4 | Germany | 6

Semifinal
2 | United States | 4
4 | Germany | 6

Final
1 | Canada | 8
4 | Germany | 3

=== 1 vs. 2 game ===
April 6, 21:30

| Sheet C | 1 | 2 | 3 | 4 | 5 | 6 | 7 | 8 | 9 | 10 | Final |
|---|---|---|---|---|---|---|---|---|---|---|---|
| Canada (Howard) 🔨 | 0 | 0 | 1 | 2 | 1 | 0 | 3 | 0 | X | X | 7 |
| United States (Birr) | 0 | 0 | 0 | 0 | 0 | 1 | 0 | 1 | X | X | 2 |

Player Percentages
| Canada | | United States | |
|---|---|---|---|
| Craig Savill | 92% | Kevin Birr | 85% |
| Brent Laing | 75% | Greg Johnson | 86% |
| Richard Hart | 88% | Bill Todhunter | 95% |
| Glenn Howard | 92% | Todd Birr | 53% |
| Total | 87% | Total | 79% |

=== 3 vs. 4 game ===
April 6, 21:30

| Sheet B | 1 | 2 | 3 | 4 | 5 | 6 | 7 | 8 | 9 | 10 | Final |
|---|---|---|---|---|---|---|---|---|---|---|---|
| Switzerland (Stöckli) | 0 | 1 | 0 | 2 | 0 | 1 | 0 | 0 | 0 | 0 | 4 |
| Germany (Kapp) 🔨 | 0 | 0 | 1 | 0 | 2 | 0 | 0 | 2 | 0 | 1 | 6 |

Player Percentages
| Switzerland | | Germany | |
|---|---|---|---|
| Simon Strübin | 91% | Andreas Kempf | 90% |
| Markus Eggler | 90% | Andreas Lang | 91% |
| Jan Hauser | 85% | Uli Kapp | 90% |
| Ralph Stöckli | 84% | Andy Kapp | 90% |
| Total | 88% | Total | 90% |

=== Semifinal ===
April 7, 10:30

| Sheet C | 1 | 2 | 3 | 4 | 5 | 6 | 7 | 8 | 9 | 10 | Final |
|---|---|---|---|---|---|---|---|---|---|---|---|
| United States (Birr) 🔨 | 0 | 0 | 1 | 0 | 1 | 0 | 2 | 0 | 0 | 0 | 4 |
| Germany (Kapp) | 1 | 0 | 0 | 2 | 0 | 1 | 0 | 1 | 0 | 1 | 6 |

Player Percentages
| United States | | Germany | |
|---|---|---|---|
| Kevin Birr | 80% | Holger Höhne | 89% |
| Greg Johnson | 91% | Andreas Lang | 84% |
| Bill Todhunter | 78% | Uli Kapp | 89% |
| Todd Birr | 73% | Andy Kapp | 85% |
| Total | 80% | Total | 87% |

=== Gold medal game ===
April 8, 11:30

| Sheet C | 1 | 2 | 3 | 4 | 5 | 6 | 7 | 8 | 9 | 10 | Final |
|---|---|---|---|---|---|---|---|---|---|---|---|
| Canada (Howard) 🔨 | 4 | 0 | 0 | 1 | 0 | 3 | 0 | 0 | X | X | 8 |
| Germany (Kapp) | 0 | 0 | 1 | 0 | 1 | 0 | 0 | 1 | X | X | 3 |

Player Percentages
| Canada | | Germany | |
|---|---|---|---|
| Craig Savill | 92% | Andreas Kempf | 91% |
| Brent Laing | 86% | Andreas Lang | 78% |
| Richard Hart | 98% | Uli Kapp | 72% |
| Glenn Howard | 98% | Andy Kapp | 80% |
| Total | 94% | Total | 80% |

2007 Ford World Curling Championship
(Canada)
Canada
30th title

== Player percentages ==
| Leads | % | Seconds | % | Thirds | % | Skips | % |
| (Canada) Craig Savill | 92 | (Canada) Brent Laing | 90 | (Canada) Richard Hart | 91 | (Canada) Glenn Howard | 91 |
| (Norway) Jan Thoresen | 91 | (Finland) Jani Sullanmaa | 85 | (United States) Bill Todhunter | 85 | (Switzerland) Ralph Stöckli | 87 |
| (Finland) Teemu Salo | 88 | (Scotland) David Smith | 85 | (Germany) Uli Kapp | 84 | (United States) Todd Birr | 85 |
| (Germany) Andreas Kempf | 88 | (United States) Greg Johnson | 84 | (Sweden) James Dryburgh | 83 | (Norway) Thomas Ulsrud | 82 |
| (Switzerland) Simon Strübin | 87 | (Germany) Andreas Lang | 83 | (Switzerland) Jan Hauser | 83 | (Sweden) Peja Lindholm | 81 |
