= Raphaël Mathieu =

French curler (born 1983)

- Curler ♂
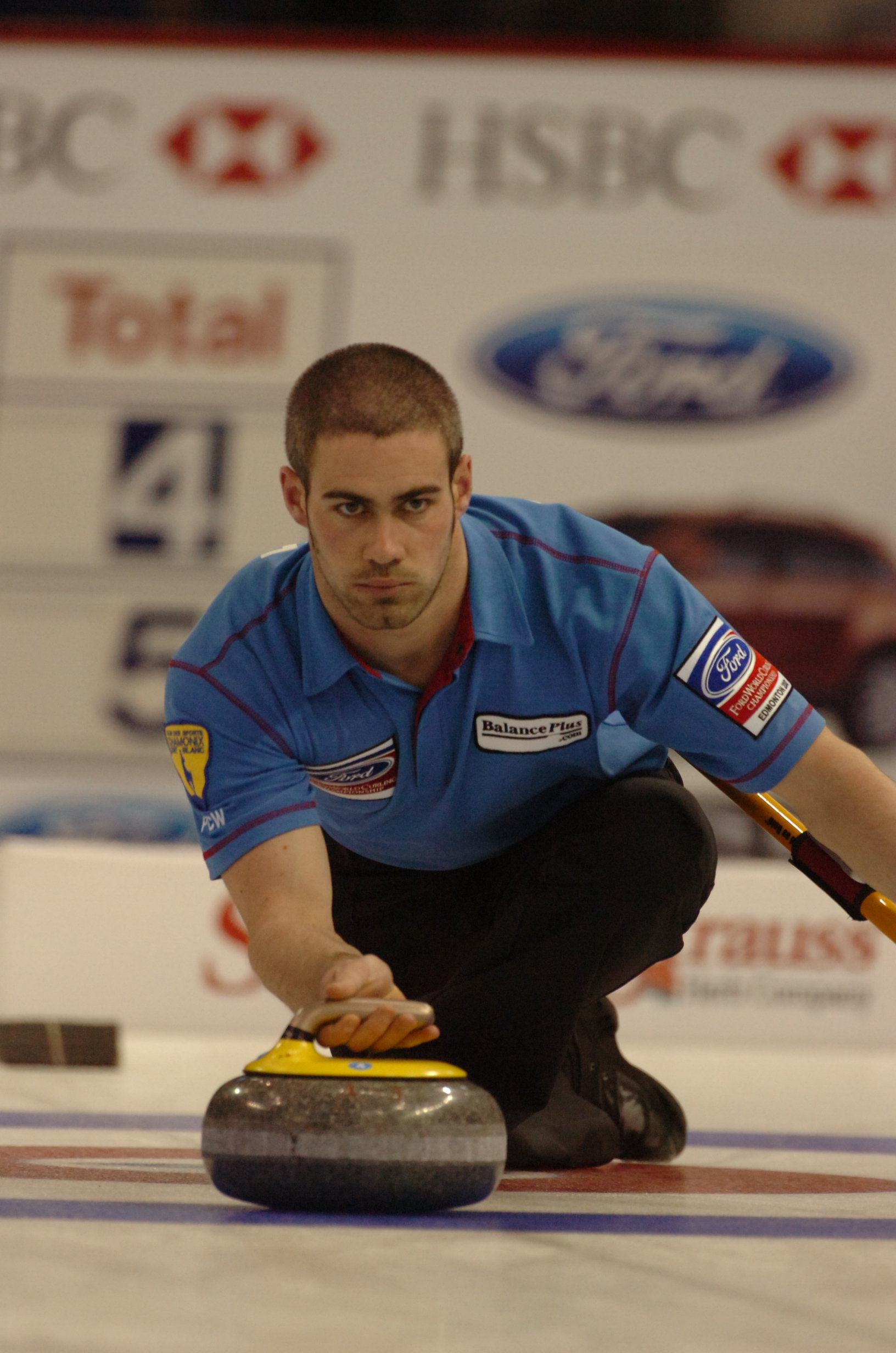
- Mathieu at the 2007 Ford World Men's Curling Championship
- Born: 18 October 1983 (age 43); Chamonix-Mont-Blanc, Haute-Savoie, France

Team
- Curling club: Chamonix CC, Chamonix

Curling career
- Member Association: France
- World Championship: 4 (2007, 2008, 2009, 2010)
- European Championship: 4 (2006, 2007, 2008, 2009)
- Olympic: 1 (2010)
- Other appearances: World Junior Championships: 1 (2001), World Junior B Championships: 2 (2001, 2003)

Raphaël "Rafi" Mathieu (born 18 October 1983) is a French curler from Chamonix, France.

== Career ==
Mathieu has participated in four World Championships (2007, 2008, 2009 and 2010). All three teams he has played as the Alternate for Team Dufour, their best performance was fifth in 2008.

Based on the points they accumulated at their three world championship appearances from 2007 to 2009 Team France qualified a team to the 2010 Vancouver Olympics where they finished in seventh place.

Outside of curling he works as an excavator driver.

== Teams ==
Season	Skip	Third	Second	Lead	Alternate	Coach	Events
2000–01	Richard Ducroz	Raphaël Mathieu	Julien Charlet	Tony Angiboust	Jérémy Frarier	Thomas Dufour	WJCC 2001 (10th)
2002–03	Richard Ducroz	Raphaël Mathieu	Tony Angiboust	Cyril Roux	Wilfrid Coulot		WJBCC 2003 (4th)
2006–07	Thomas Dufour	Tony Angiboust	Jan Henri Ducroz	Raphaël Mathieu	Richard Ducroz		ECC 2007 (7th)
2006–07	Thomas Dufour	Tony Angiboust	Jan Henri Ducroz	Richard Ducroz	Raphaël Mathieu	Daniel Rafael	WCC 2007 (7th)
2007–08	Thomas Dufour	Tony Angiboust	Jan Henri Ducroz	Richard Ducroz	Raphaël Mathieu	Hervé Poirot (ECC); André Ferland (WCC)	ECC 2007 (7th); WCC 2008 (5th)
2008–09	Thomas Dufour	Tony Angiboust	Jan Henri Ducroz	Richard Ducroz	Raphaël Mathieu	André Ferland	ECC 2008 (6th); WCC 2009 (8th)
2009–10	Thomas Dufour	Tony Angiboust	Jan Henri Ducroz	Richard Ducroz	Raphaël Mathieu	André Ferland	ECC 2009 (5th); WOG 2010 (7th); WCC 2010 (9th)
