= Cyril Roux =

Cyril Roux has been the Deputy Governor (Financial Regulation) of the Central Bank of Ireland, a position more commonly known as "the Financial Regulator" since 1 October 2013. Mr Roux was the First Deputy Secretary General of the French prudential supervisory authority for banks and insurance companies (ACPR) since the authority was created in March 2010. Prior to joining ACPR, he was the Deputy Secretary General of the French insurance supervisory authority and spent 10 years at AXA in a variety of posts. He replaced outgoing regulator Matthew Elderfield, who took up a new job at Lloyds Banking Group. Mr Roux has been appointed on a five-year contract with an annual salary of €310,000.
