= Wilfrid Coulot =

French male curler and coach (born 1986)

- Curler ♂
- Born: 25 June 1986 (age 40); Besançon, France

Team
- Curling club: Chamonix CC, Chamonix, Besançon Curling Club, Besançon
- Mixed doubles partner: Stéphanie Barbarin

Curling career
- Member Association: France
- World Championship: 2 (2011, 2012)
- World Mixed Doubles Championship: 3 (2009, 2024, 2026)
- European Championship: 4 (2010, 2011, 2012, 2015)
- Other appearances: World Junior-B Championships: 2 (2003, 2004), European Junior Challenge: 2 (2005, 2007)
Medal record
Curling
European Junior Challenge
Silver medal – second place	2005 Copenhagen

Wilfrid Coulot (French: [wilfʁid kulo]; born 25 June 1986 in Besançon, France) is a French curler and curling coach. He also competed as a cyclist.

== Teams ==
=== Men's ===
Season	Skip	Third	Second	Lead	Alternate	Coach	Events
2004–05	Wilfrid Coulot	Amaury Pernette	Romain Borini	Alexandre Ceriovi		Lerale-Alexandre Janc	EJCC 2005 (silver)
2006–07	Wilfrid Coulot	Romain Borini	Amaury Pernette	Aurélien Fasano	Damien Bertoluzzi	Marc Lerave-Alexandre	EJCC 2007 (5th)
2010–11	Tony Angiboust (fourth)	Thomas Dufour (skip)	Lionel Roux	Wilfrid Coulot	Jan Ducroz	Phillippe Bertrand (ECC); Jan Ducroz (WCC)	ECC 2010 (8th); WCC 2011 (5th)
2011–12	Tony Angiboust (fourth)	Thomas Dufour (skip)	Lionel Roux	Wilfrid Coulot	Jérémy Frarier	Björn Schröder	ECC 2011 (8th); WCC 2012 (10th)
2012–13	Thomas Dufour	Lionel Roux	Wilfrid Coulot	Jérémy Frarier	Tony Angiboust	Björn Schröder; Alain Contat	ECC 2012 (8th)
2013–14	Tony Angiboust (fourth)	Thomas Dufour (skip)	Wilfrid Coulot	Jérémy Frarier	Romain Borini	Yannick Renggli	2013 OQE (7th)
2015–16	Wilfrid Coulot	Jean-Olivier Biechely	Louis Pizon	Simon Pagnot	Sylvain Mouterde		ECC 2015 (27th) ( (bronze) in C div.)

=== Mixed doubles ===
Season	Female	Male	Events
2009	Solène Coulot	Wilfrid Coulot	WMDCC 2009 (15th)
2024	Kseniya Shevchuk	Wilfrid Coulot	WMDCC 2024 (18th)
2026	Stéphanie Barbarin	Wilfrid Coulot	WMDCC 2026 (17th)

== Record as a coach of national teams ==
Year	Tournament, event	National team	Place
2008	2008 European Junior Curling Challenge	France (junior women)	4
2009	2009 European Junior Curling Challenge	France (junior women)	1st place, gold medalist(s)
2009	2009 World Junior Curling Championships	France (junior women)	9
2010	2010 World Junior Curling Championships	France (junior women)	6

== Personal life ==
His sisters Solène and Marie were also curlers. Wilfrid was the coach of their team for several years.
