= Thomas Dufour =

French curler (born 1973)

- Curler ♂
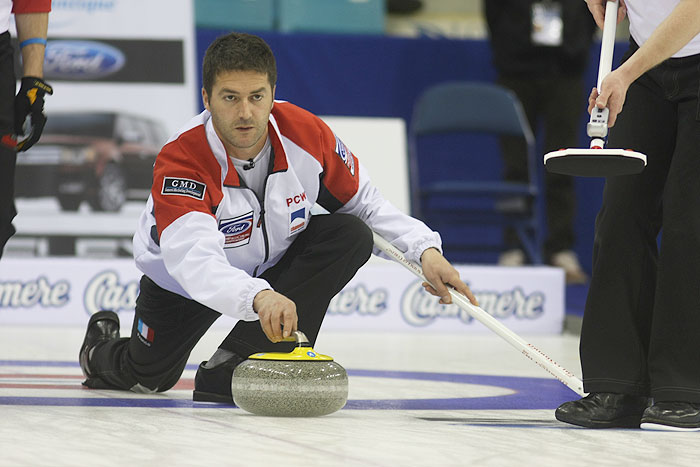
- Born: 12 February 1973 (age 53); Chamonix, France

Team
- Curling club: Chamonix CC, Chamonix
- Skip: Thomas Dufour
- Fourth: Tony Angiboust
- Second: Lionel Roux
- Lead: Wilfrid Coulot
- Alternate: Jérémy Frarier

Curling career
- World Championship: 8 (2001, 2004, 2007, 2008, 2009, 2010, 2011, 2012)
- European Championship: 15 (1995, 1996, 1997, 1998, 2000, 2003, 2004, 2005, 2006, 2007, 2008, 2009, 2010, 2011,2012)
- Olympic: 2 (2002, 2010)
Medal record
Men's curling
Representing France
World Junior Championships
Silver medal – second place	1992 Oberstdorf
Bronze medal – third place	1993 Grindelwald

Thomas Dufour (born 12 February 1973) is a French curler. He currently skips the French national team.

== Career ==
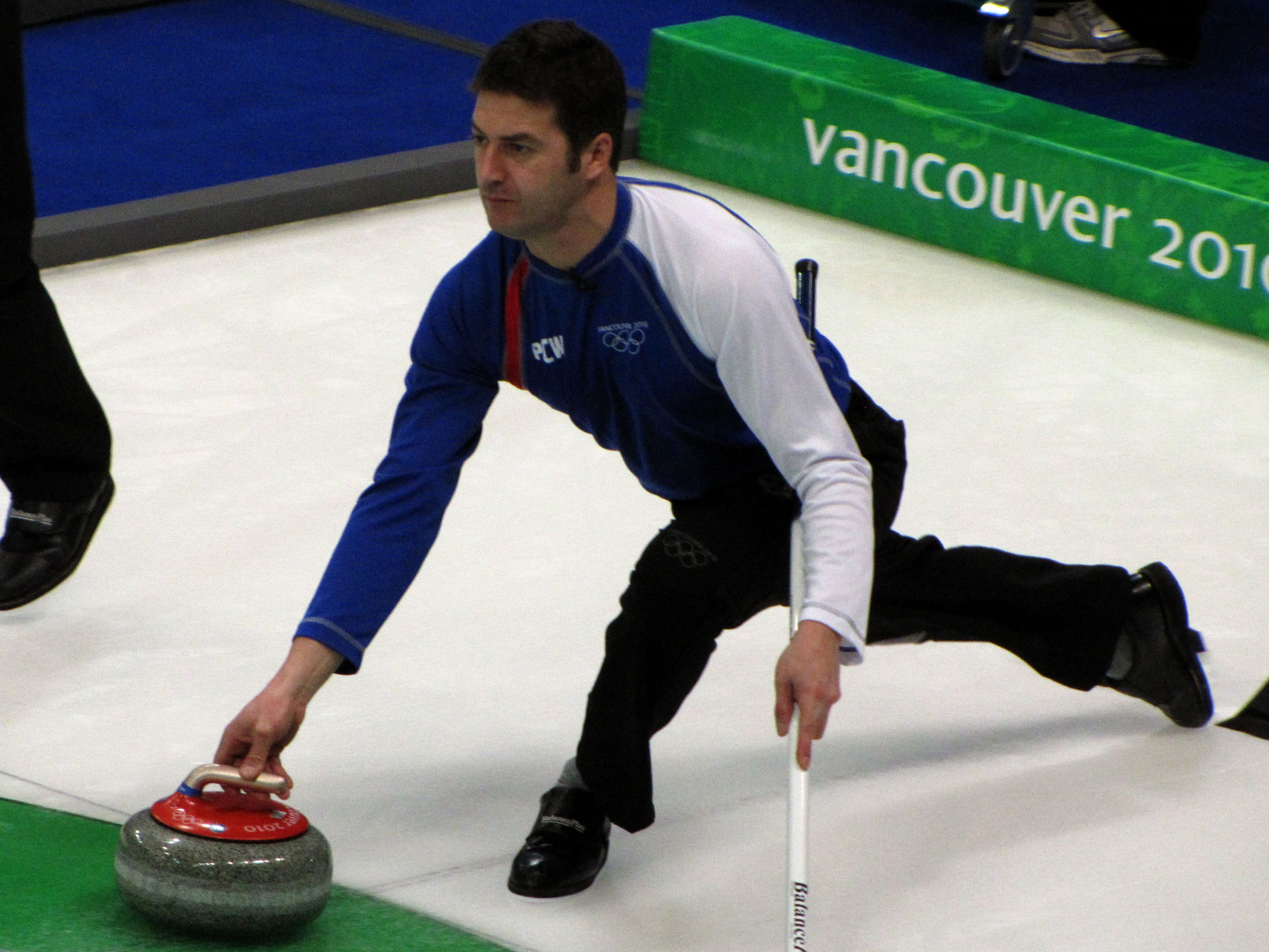
Dufour at the 2010 Winter Olympics

Thomas Dufour has played in:

- 2 Olympic Games, the 2002 Salt Lake City Winter Olympics and the 2010 Vancouver Winter Olympics.
- 8 World Curling Championships (2001, 2004, 2007, 2008, 2009, 2010, 2011, 2012).
- 15 European Curling Championships (1995, 1996, 1997, 1998, 2000, 2003, 2004, 2005, 2006, 2007, 2008, 2009, 2010, 2011, 2012).
- 5 World Junior Curling Championships (1990, 1991, 1992, 1993, 1994).

Dufour's best placing at the World Championships was a fifth-place finish in 2008 and 2011. At the 2010 Olympics, the team finished 7th, where they made a terrific shot to win their first game against china.

Dufour won two medals in his junior career. In 1992, he won the silver medal at the World Juniors, playing lead for Jan Henri Ducroz. In 1993, he won the bronze medal playing third for Spencer Mugnier.

He also won a bronze medal at the 2011 World Mixed Doubles Curling Championship coaching Pauline Jeanneret and Amaury Pernette.

In 2008 he won the Colin Campbell Award (best spormantship during the worlds)

== Teams ==
Season	Skip	Third	Second	Lead	Alternate	Events
1989–90	Jan Henri Ducroz	Spencer Mugnier	Sylvain Ducroz	Thomas Dufour		1990 WJCC
1990–91	Jan Henri Ducroz	Spencer Mugnier	Sylvain Ducroz	Thomas Dufour	Philippe Caux	1991 WJCC
1991–92	Jan Henri Ducroz	Spencer Mugnier	Sylvain Ducroz	Thomas Dufour	Philippe Caux	1992 WJCC
1992–93	Spencer Mugnier	Thomas Dufour	Sylvain Ducroz	Philippe Caux	Cyrille Prunet	1993 WJCC
1993–94	Spencer Mugnier	Thomas Dufour	Sylvain Ducroz	Philippe Caux	Cyrille Prunet	1994 WJCC
1995–96	Jan Henri Ducroz	Spencer Mugnier	Daniel Cosetto	Thomas Dufour	Lionel Tournier	1995 ECC
2004–05	Thomas Dufour	Lionel Roux	Philippe Caux	Tony Angiboust		
2005–06	Thomas Dufour	Philippe Caux	Tony Angiboust	Julien Charlet		
2006–07	Thomas Dufour	Tony Angiboust	Jan Henri Ducroz	Richard Ducroz		
2007–08	Thomas Dufour	Tony Angiboust	Jan Henri Ducroz	Richard Ducroz	Raphael Mathieu	
2008–09	Thomas Dufour	Tony Angiboust	Richard Ducroz (Note: Lead for most of the season)	Jan Henri Ducroz (Note: Second for most of the season)	Raphael Mathieu	2009 WCC
2009–10	Thomas Dufour	Tony Angiboust	Jan Henri Ducroz	Richard Ducroz	Raphael Mathieu	2010 OGs
2010–11	Thomas Dufour	Tony Angiboust (fourth)	Lionel Roux	Wilfrid Coulot	Jan Ducroz	2011 WCC
