= Tony Angiboust =

French curler (born 1983)

- Curler
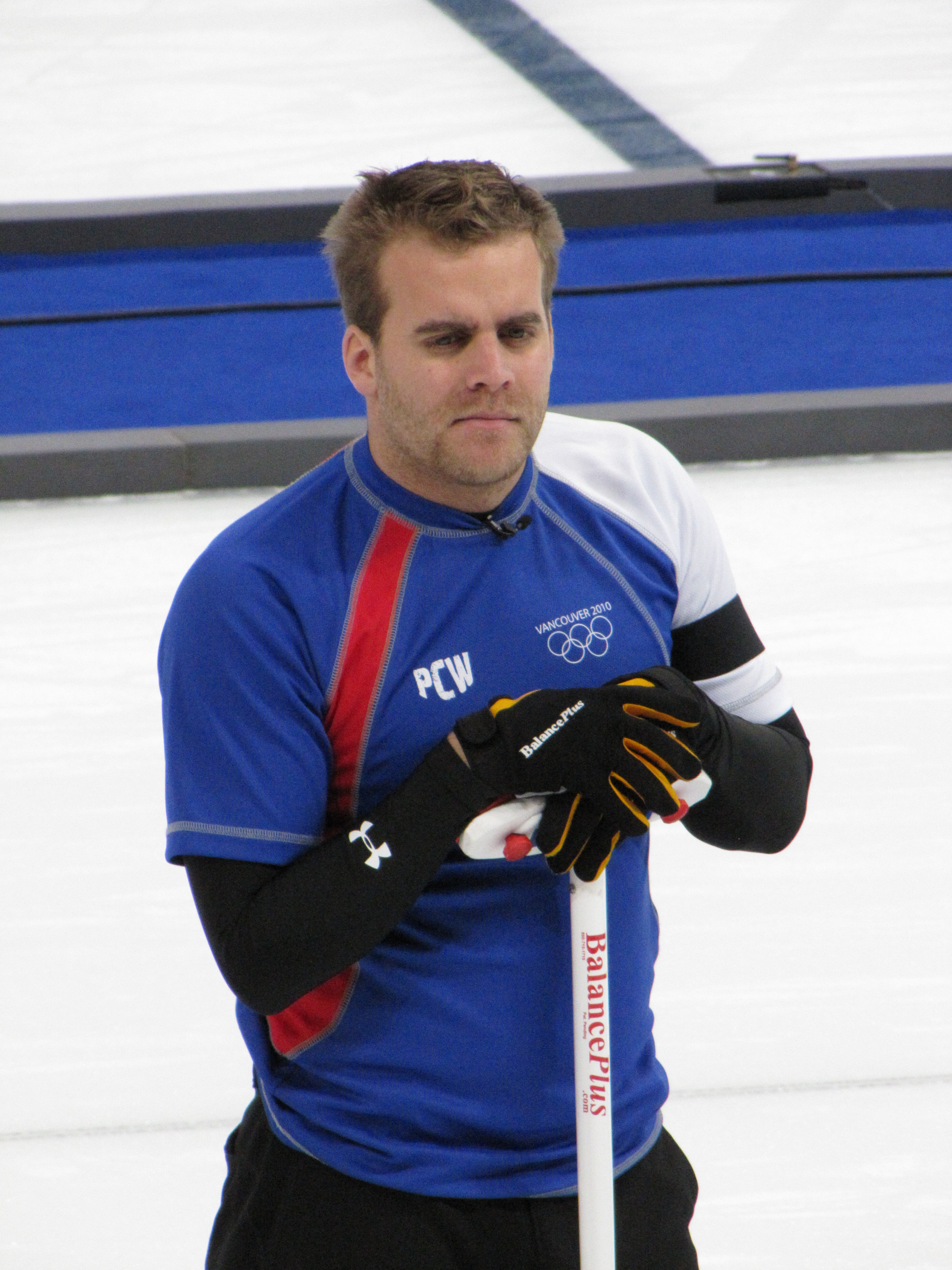
- Angiboust at the 2010 Winter Olympics
- Born: 10 June 1983 (age 43); Chamonix, France

Team
- Skip: Thomas Dufour
- Fourth: Tony Angiboust
- Second: Wilfrid Coulot
- Lead: Jérémy Frarier
- Alternate: Romain Borini

Curling career
- World Championship: 7 (2004, 2007, 2008, 2009, 2010, 2011, 2012)
- World Mixed Doubles Championship: 2 (2012, 2014)
- European Championship: 9 (2003, 2005, 2006, 2007, 2008, 2009, 2010, 2011, 2012)
- Olympic: 1 (2010)

Tony Angiboust (born 10 June 1983 in Chamonix, France) is an internationally elite curler from France.

== Career ==
Tony Angiboust started curling in 1992 and curls out of the Sport Club of Chamonix.

He currently is on the French team skipped by Thomas Dufour. He made his World Championship debut in 2007 where the team placed with a 6 - 5 record which placed them in a tie for fourth. However, they lost their tiebreaker against Team Sweden (skipped by Peja Lindholm) and finished in a tie for fifth place. Team France also finished the 2008 World Championships with a 6 - 5 record which again placed them in fifth place. At the 2009 World Championships they placed eighth with a 4 - 7 record.

Tony Angiboust's team qualified for the 2010 Vancouver Olympic Games. He played Third for Team France as he has at the previous three world championships. He has yet to win a medal at a major competition.

== Teammates ==
2007 Edmonton World Championships

2008 Grand Forks World Championships

2009 Moncton World Championships

2010 Vancouver Olympic Games

Thomas Dufour, Skip

Jan Henri Ducroz, Second

Richard Ducroz, Lead

Raphael Mathieu, Alternate
