= Richard Ducroz =

French curler (born 1983)

Richard Ducroz (born 11 June 1983) is an internationally elite curler from Chamonix, France.

He made his World Championship debut at the 2007 Edmonton World Championships with a team skipped by Thomas Dufour. The team finished the round robin competition with a 6–5 record and in a four way tie for fourth place. They lost their tiebreaker against Team Sweden skipped by Peja Lindholm. In 2008 he returned to the World Championships with the same team and achieved the same 6–5 win–loss record, this time to finish in fifth place. Team Dufour's third trip to the world championships was less successful. They finished with a 4–7 record and in eighth place; however, it was good enough to earn a spot for Team France at the 2010 Vancouver Olympics.

Richard Ducroz's team has also competed at five European Championships and won the B Championship title at the 2005 Garmisch-Partenkirchen Championships.

For the 2010 Olympic Games he is officially listed as playing Lead; however, at some competitions he will throw Second stones.

== Teammates ==
2010 Vancouver Olympic Games

- Thomas Dufour, Skip
- Tony Angiboust, Third
- Jan Henri Ducroz, Lead
- Raphael Mathieu, Alternate
