= Jan Ducroz =

French curler (born 1971)

Jan Henri Ducroz (born 6 May 1971) is an internationally elite curler from Chamonix, France.

He made his World Championship debut at the 2007 Ford World Men's Curling Championship with a team skipped by Thomas Dufour. The team finished the round robin competition with a 6 - 5 record and in a four way tie for fourth place. They lost their tiebreaker against Team Sweden skipped by Peja Lindholm. In 2008 he returned to the World Championships with the same team and again ended the round robin portion with a 6 - 5 record, this time to finish in fifth place. Team Dufour's third trip to the world championships was less successful. They finished with a 4 - 7 record and in eighth place; however, it was good enough to earn a spot for Team France at the 2010 Vancouver Olympics.

Jan Henri Ducroz is officially listed as the Second for Team France at the Olympics; however, at some competitions he has thrown Lead stones.

His profession outside of curling is as a Ski Resort Owner.

== Teammates ==
2010 Vancouver Olympic Games

- Thomas Dufour, Skip
- Tony Angiboust, Third
- Richard Ducroz, Lead
- Raphael Mathieu, Alternate
