= 2001 Players' Championship =

2001 Husky WCT Players' Championship
- Host city: Calgary, Alberta
- Arena: Calgary Curling Club
- Dates: March 21–25
- Winner: (Ontario) Team Middaugh
- Curling club: St. George's G&CC
- Skip: Wayne Middaugh
- Third: Graeme McCarrel
- Second: Ian Tetley
- Lead: Scott Bailey
- Finalist: (Alberta) Kevin Martin

The 2001 Husky WCT Players' Championship, the championship of the men's World Curling Tour for the 2000-01 curling season was held March 21–25, 2001 at the Calgary Curling Club in Calgary, Alberta. The total purse for the event was $150,000 with $40,000 going to the winning team. The top Canadian team received a berth into the 2001 Canadian Olympic Curling Trials.

Wayne Middaugh of Ontario defeated Kevin Martin of Alberta in the final, 10–5. Middaugh made a triple take out in the first end to go up 3–0. In the second end, Martin ticked a guard on his final shot, which was an attempted hit for two. The miss gave Middaugh a steal of one to go up 4–0. Martin got one the scoreboard with a single in the third, but missed a draw attempt in the fourth, allowing Middaugh to make a tap for three to go up 7–1. That put the game out of reach for Martin, as Middaugh played a peel game to protect the lead.

As the two finalist teams had already qualified for the Olympic Trials, the berth went to the winner of a special third place playoff between Russ Howard of New Brunswick and Peter Corner of Ontario. Howard won that game 7–3.

The event was the last Players' Championship to be held before the creation of the Grand Slam of Curling, which included the Players' as one of its events.

The semifinals and finals were aired on Global TV.

== Teams ==
The event featured the top 20 Canadian money earners on the World Curling Tour, the top two European earners, and the top American team, along with a sponsors exemption (Vic Peters). Kerry Burtnyk, Kevin Park and Randy Ferbey elected to not participate (Team Ferbey was preparing for the 2001 World Men's Curling Championship). John Morris, Greg McAulay, Jeff Stoughton, Bert Gretzinger, Wayne Middaugh and Kevin Martin had already qualified for the Olympic Trials.

The teams were as follows:

Skip	Third	Second	Lead	Locale	Season earnings to date ($CA)
Dave Boehmer	Brent Braemer	Terry McRae	Mike Pohl	Winnipeg, Manitoba	$22,500
Tom Brewster	Graeme Connal	Ron Brewster	Mark Brass	Howwood, Scotland	$16,161
Craig Brown	Ryan Quinn	Jon Brunt	John Dunlop	(United States) Madison, Wisconsin	$16,250
David Climenhaga (Note: Team not listed in source. Roster as of Jan 2001.)	John Climenhaga	Kent Stannard	Brad Kucek	Edmonton, Alberta	$20,000
Peter Corner	Pierre Charette	Todd Brandwood	Scott Foster	Hamilton, Ontario	$35,975
Bryan Derbowka	Dean Klippenstine	Jeff Sharp	Ryan MacGregor	Yorkton, Saskatchewan	$22,750
Glen Despins	Art Paulsen	Dwayne Mihalicz	Phillip Germain	Strongfield, Saskatchewan	$29,050
Rob Ewen	Gerry Adam	Michael Vereschagin	Ken Ewen	Jansen, Saskatchewan	$21,000
Bert Gretzinger	Bob Ursel	Mark Whittle	Dave Mellof	Kelowna, British Columbia	$25,000
Dale Duguid (Note: Sparing for Guy Hemmings, who could not play due to a new job in France)	Don Westphal	Guy Thibaudeau	Dale Ness	Saint-Lambert, Quebec	$40,000
Glenn Howard	Richard Hart	Collin Mitchell	Jason Mitchell	MacTier, Ontario	$29,200
Russ Howard	James Grattan	Rick Perron	Grant Odishaw	Moncton, New Brunswick	$49,350
James Kirkness	Travis Graham	Chris Galbraith	A. J. Girardin	Winnipeg, Manitoba	$23,825
Bruce Korte	Darrell McKee	Roger Korte	Rory Golanowski	Saskatoon, Saskatchewan	$21,150
Allan Lyburn	Rob Fowler	Mark Taylor	Ross Granger	Brandon, Manitoba	$32,275
Kevin Martin	Don Walchuk	Carter Rycroft	Don Bartlett	Edmonton, Alberta	$36,250
Greg McAulay	Brent Pierce	Bryan Miki	Jody Sveistrup	New Westminster, British Columbia	$34,801
Chad McMullan	Ken Tresoor	Ryan Fry	Jeff Steski	Winnipeg, Manitoba	$22,952
Wayne Middaugh	Graeme McCarrel	Ian Tetley	Scott Bailey	Victoria Harbour, Ontario	$61,950
John Morris	Joe Frans	Craig Savill	Brent Laing	Waterloo, Ontario	$27,700
Scott Patterson	Greg Cantin	John McClelland	Phil Loevenmark	North Bay, Ontario	$20,575
Vic Peters	Dave Smith	Chris Neufeld	Don Harvey	Winnipeg, Manitoba	$19,825
Jeff Stoughton	Jon Mead	Garry Vandenberghe	Doug Armstrong	Winnipeg, Manitoba	$29,400
Bernhard Werthemann	Raphael Brütsch	Thomas Lips	Phillip Raspe	Basel, Switzerland	$29,762

=== Round-robin standings ===
The top two teams in each pool advanced to the playoffs.

Final round-robin standings

Key
Teams to Playoffs
Teams to Tiebreakers

Pool A	W	L
(Ontario) Wayne Middaugh	4	1
(Manitoba) Jeff Stoughton	3	2
(Scotland) Tom Brewster	3	2
(Saskatchewan) Bryan Derbowka	2	3
(Manitoba) Chad McMullan	2	3
(Switzerland) Bernhard Werthemann	1	4

Pool B	W	L
(Alberta) David Climenhaga	4	1
(New Brunswick) Russ Howard	3	2
(Ontario) Glenn Howard	3	2
(United States) Craig Brown	2	3
(Manitoba) Dave Boehmer	2	3
(Manitoba) Allan Lyburn	1	4

Pool C	W	L
(British Columbia) Greg McAulay	4	1
(Saskatchewan) Bruce Korte	4	1
(Quebec) Team Hemmings	3	2
(Saskatchewan) Glen Despins	2	3
(Manitoba) Vic Peters	2	3
(Manitoba) James Kirkness	0	5

Pool D	W	L
(Alberta) Kevin Martin	4	1
(Ontario) Peter Corner	4	1
(British Columbia) Bert Gretzinger	3	2
(Ontario) John Morris	2	3
(Ontario) Scott Patterson	1	4
(Saskatchewan) Rob Ewen	1	4

== Scores ==
Scores were as follows:

=== Draw 1 ===
- Middaugh 7, Brewster 4
- Stoughton 10, Werthemann 4
- McMullan 8, Derbowka 5
- Brown 9, R. Howard 5
- G. Howard 10, Lyburn 2
- Climenhaga 8, Boehmer 6

=== Draw 2 ===
- Peters 7, Hemmings 1
- McAulay 6, Despins 2
- Korte 5, Kirkness 2
- Martin 7, Patterson 2
- Morris 7, Corner 2
- Gretzinger 6, Ewen 5

=== Draw 3 ===
- Climenhaga 6, G. Howard 5
- Derbowka 8, Middaugh 2
- Werthemann 9, Brewster 7
- Stoughton 5, McMullan 3
- Boehmer 7, R. Howard 6
- Brown 5, Lyburn 4

=== Draw 4 ===
- Gretzinger 7, Morris 2
- Team Hemmings 6, Korte 3
- McAulay 9, Peters 2
- Despins 7, Kirkness 3
- Martin 6, Ewen 2
- Corner 6, Patterson 4

=== Draw 5 ===
- Corner 10, Ewen 9
- Morris 5, Patterson 1
- Team Hemmings 8, Kirkness 4
- Korte 8, McAulay 6
- Despins 5, Peters 2
- Martin 7, Gretzinger 5

=== Draw 6 ===
- Lyburn 6, Boehmer 3
- G. Howard 6, Brown 3
- Middaugh 9, McMullan 3
- Derbowka 9, Werthemann 2
- Brewster 8, Stoughton 7
- R. Howard 7, Climenhaga 5

=== Draw 7 ===
- Martin 8, Morris 6
- Corner 8, Gretzinger 4
- Patterson 9, Ewen 6
- Team Hemmings 8, Despins 6
- McAulay 10, Kirkness 3
- Korte 6, Peters 4

=== Draw 8 ===
- R. Howard 10, G. Howard 8
- Climenhaga 7, Lyburn 3
- Boehmer 9, Brown 5
- Middaugh 6, Stoughton 5
- McMullan 9, Werthemann 5
- Brewster 4, Derbowka 3

=== Draw 9 ===
- Stoughton 8, Derbowka 2
- Brewster 8, McMullan 7
- R. Howard 9, Lyburn 4
- G. Howard 7, Boehmer 6
- Climenhaga 7, Brown 6
- Middaugh 6, Werthemann 1

=== Draw 10 ===
- McAulay 7, Team Hemmings 2
- Korte 8, Despins 6
- Peters 9, Kirkness 6
- Corner 6, Martin 4
- Ewen 5, Morris 4
- Gretzinger 7, Patterson 6

=== Tiebreakers ===
- Stoughton 5, Brewster 4
- R. Howard 8, G. Howard 6

==== Playoffs ====
(Note: Teams are seeded by their money-winnings)

Quarterfinals
1	(Ontario) Wayne Middaugh	7
8	(Alberta) David Climenhaga	3
4	(Ontario) Peter Corner	5
5	(British Columbia) Greg McAulay	4
3	(Alberta) Kevin Martin	8
5	(Manitoba) Jeff Stoughton	2
2	(New Brunswick) Russ Howard	8
7	(Saskatchewan) Bruce Korte	5

Semifinals
1	(Ontario) Wayne Middaugh	6
4	(Ontario) Peter Corner	3
3	(Alberta) Kevin Martin	8
2	(New Brunswick) Russ Howard	7

Finals
1	(Ontario) Wayne Middaugh	10
3	(Alberta) Kevin Martin	5
Trials berth
2	(New Brunswick) Russ Howard	7
4	(Ontario) Peter Corner	3
