= 2012 Swiss Cup Basel =

- Host city: Arlesheim, Switzerland
- Arena: Curlingzentrum Region Basel
- Dates: October 4–7
- Winner: (Sweden) Oskar Eriksson
- Skip: Oskar Eriksson
- Fourth: Kristian Lindström
- Second: Markus Eriksson
- Lead: Christoffer Sundgren
- Finalist: (Switzerland) Sven Michel

The 2012 Swiss Cup Basel was held from October 4 to 7 at the Curlingzentrum Region Basel in Arlesheim, Switzerland as part of the 2012–13 World Curling Tour. The event was held in a triple-knockout format, and the purse for the event was CHF40,000, of which the winner, Oskar Eriksson, received CHF13,000. Eriksson defeated Sven Michel in the final with a score of 5–4.

== Teams ==
The teams are listed as follows:

Skip	Third	Second	Lead	Locale
Evgeny Arkhipov	Sergei Glukhov	Dmitry Mironov	Arthu Ali	Russia
Benno Arnold	Ramon Hess	Timon Schiumph	Rene Senn	Basel, Switzerland
Alexander Attinger	Felix Attinger	Daniel Schifferli	Simon Attinger	Switzerland
Tom Brewster	Greg Drummond	Scott Andrews	Michael Goodfellow	Aberdeen, Scotland
Mark Dacey	Tom Sullivan	Steve Burgess	Andrew Gibson	Halifax, Canada
Benoît Schwarz (fourth)	Peter de Cruz (skip)	Dominik Märki	Valentin Tanner	Switzerland
Tony Angiboust (fourth)	Thomas Dufour (skip)	Lionel Roux	Wilfrid Coulot	Chamonix, France
Niklas Edin	Sebastian Kraupp	Fredrik Lindberg	Viktor Kjäll	Karlstad, Sweden
Kristian Lindström (fourth)	Oskar Eriksson (skip)	Markus Eriksson	Christoffer Sundgren	Karlstad, Sweden
Mario Freiberger	Sven Iten	Pascal Eicher	Rainer Kobler	Switzerland
Logan Gray	Ross Paterson	Alasdair Guthrie	Richard Woods	Stirling, Scotland
Grant Hardie	Jay McWilliam	Hammy McMillan Jr.	Billy Morton	Dumfries, Scotland
Stefan Häsler	Christian Bangerter	Christian Roth	Jörg Lüthy	Switzerland
Marcus Hasselborg	Peder Folke	Andreas Prytz	Anton Sandström	Sweden
Pascal Hess	Yves Hess	Florian Meister	Stefan Meienberg	Switzerland
Felix Schulze (fourth)	John Jahr (skip)	Peter Rickmers	Sven Goldemann	Hamburg, Germany
Andy Lang	Daniel Herberg	Daniel Neuner	Andreas Kempf	Füssen, Germany
Sven Michel	Claudio Pätz	Sandro Trolliet	Simon Gempeler	Adelboden, Switzerland
Meico Öhninger	Andri Heimann	Kyrill Öhninger	Kevin Wunderlin	Switzerland
Marco Pascale	Stefano Castelli	Lorenzo Piatti	Elvis Molinero	Italy
Marc Pfister	Roger Meier	Enrico Pfister	Raphael Märki	Switzerland
Andrea Pilzer				Italy
Tomi Rantamaki	Jussi Uusipaacalniemi	Peeka Peura	Jermu Pollanen	Finland
Manuel Ruch	Jean-Nicolas Longchamp	Daniel Graf	Mathias Graf	Uitikon, Switzerland
Roman Ruch	Rolf Bruggmann	Felix Bader	Michael Devaux	Uitikon, Switzerland
Michael Schifferli	Luethi Hubert	Jonas Waechil	Sandro Portmann	Bern, Switzerland
Urs Beglinger (fourth)	Reto Seiler (skip)	Urs Kuhn	Beat A. Stephan	St. Gallen, Switzerland
Jiří Snítil	Martin Snítil	Jindřich Kitzberger	Marek Vydra	Brno, Czech Republic
Alexey Tselousov	Alexey Stukalsky	Andrey Drozdov	Artur Razhabov	Saint-Petersburg, Russia
Thomas Ulsrud	Torger Nergård	Christoffer Svae	Håvard Vad Petersson	Oslo, Norway
Andreas Unterberger	Markus Forejtek	Christian Roth	Marcus Schmitt	Austria
Bernhard Werthemann	Bastian Brun	Florian Zürrer	Paddy Käser	Switzerland

== Knockout results ==
The draw is listed as follows:

=== A event ===
First Knockout
(Scotland) Tom Brewster	6
(Switzerland) Benno Arnold	2
(Switzerland) Pascal Hess	9
(Switzerland) Benno Arnold	3
(Switzerland) Peter de Cruz	1
(Italy) Marco Pascale	8
(Sweden) Oskar Eriksson	7
(Switzerland) Alexander Attinger	4
(Germany) John Jahr	6
(Switzerland) Meico Öhninger	4
(Scotland) Logan Gray	2
(Switzerland) Mario Freiberger	4
(Sweden) Niklas Edin	4
(Switzerland) Roman Ruch	5
(Czech Republic) Jiří Snítil	5
(Switzerland) Reto Seiler	1

Quarterfinals
(Scotland) Tom Brewster	5
(Switzerland) Pascal Hess	4
(Italy) Marco Pascale	3
(Sweden) Oskar Eriksson	8
(Germany) John Jahr	3
(Switzerland) Mario Freiberger	4
(Switzerland) Roman Ruch	4
(Czech Republic) Jiří Snítil	5

Semifinals
(Scotland) Tom Brewster	7
(Sweden) Oskar Eriksson	11
(Switzerland) Mario Freiberger	1
(Czech Republic) Jiří Snítil	5

Qualifier 1
(Sweden) Oskar Eriksson	5
(Czech Republic) Jiří Snítil	2

First Knockout
(Germany) Andy Lang	7
(Switzerland) Stefan Häsler	4
(Canada) Mark Dacey	10
(Russia) Evgeny Arkhipov	5
(Switzerland) Sven Michel	5
(Austria) Andreas Unterberger	4
(Scotland) Grant Hardie	4
(Switzerland) Manuel Ruch	6
(Norway) Thomas Ulsrud	7
(Switzerland) Michael Schifferli	2
(Sweden) Marcus Hasselborg	3
(Switzerland) Bernhard Werthemann	5
(France) Thomas Dufour	5
(Switzerland) Marc Pfister	6
(Finland) Tomi Rantamäki	3
(Russia) Alexey Tselousov	5

Quarterfinals
(Germany) Andy Lang	2
(Canada) Mark Dacey	7
(Switzerland) Sven Michel	6
(Switzerland) Manuel Ruch	5
(Norway) Thomas Ulsrud	7
(Switzerland) Bernhard Werthemann	2
(Switzerland) Marc Pfister	8
(Russia) Alexey Tselousov	2

Semifinals
(Canada) Mark Dacey	3
(Switzerland) Sven Michel	8
(Norway) Thomas Ulsrud	6
(Switzerland) Marc Pfister	4

Qualifier 2
(Switzerland) Sven Michel	7
(Norway) Thomas Ulsrud	2

=== B event ===
Second Knockout
(Switzerland) Benno Arnold	6
(Italy) Andrea Pilzer	2
(Switzerland) Peter de Cruz	4
(Switzerland) Alexander Attinger	6
(Switzerland) Meico Öhninger	2
(Scotland) Logan Gray	6
(Sweden) Niklas Edin	9
(Switzerland) Reto Seiler	2

Quarterfinals
(Switzerland) Benno Arnold	7
(Switzerland) Alexander Attinger	4
(Scotland) Logan Gray	6
(Sweden) Niklas Edin	4

Semifinals
(Switzerland) Benno Arnold	2
(Canada) Mark Dacey	8
(Scotland) Logan Gray	6
(Switzerland) Marc Pfister	7

To Qualifier 3
(Canada) Mark Dacey	6
(Switzerland) Marc Pfister	5
Qualifier 3
(Canada) Mark Dacey	4
(Switzerland) Bernhard Werthemann	3

Second Knockout		Semifinals		To Qualifier 3
				(Norway) Thomas Ulsrud	3
(Germany) Andy Lang	4			(Switzerland) Bernhard Werthemann	8
(Switzerland) Manuel Ruch	6	(Switzerland) Manuel Ruch	1
(Switzerland) Bernhard Werthemann	5	(Switzerland) Bernhard Werthemann	5
(Russia) Alexey Tselousov	4

Second Knockout		Semifinals		To Qualifier 4
(Switzerland) Pascal Hess	6
(Italy) Marco Pascale	2	(Switzerland) Pascal Hess	3
(Germany) John Jahr	7	(Germany) John Jahr	6
(Switzerland) Roman Ruch	2			(Germany) John Jahr	6
				(Czech Republic) Jiří Snítil	2

Second Knockout
(Switzerland) Stefan Häsler	6
(Russia) Evgeny Arkhipov	5
(Austria) Andreas Unterberger	3
(Scotland) Grant Hardie	4
(Switzerland) Michael Schifferli	4
(Sweden) Marcus Hasselborg	5
(France) Thomas Dufour	6
(Finland) Tomi Rantamäki	3

Quarterfinals
(Switzerland) Stefan Häsler	2
(Scotland) Grant Hardie	5
(Sweden) Marcus Hasselborg	5
(France) Thomas Dufour	6

Semifinals
(Scotland) Tom Brewster	8
(Scotland) Grant Hardie	6
(Switzerland) Mario Freiberger	8
(France) Thomas Dufour	6

To Qualifier 4
(Scotland) Tom Brewster	4
(Switzerland) Mario Freiberger	6
Qualifier 4
(Germany) John Jahr	4
(Switzerland) Mario Freiberger	3

=== C event ===
Third Knockout
(Italy) Andrea Pilzer	5
(Switzerland) Peter de Cruz	6
(Switzerland) Meico Öhninger	5
(Switzerland) Reto Seiler	2

Quarterfinals
(Germany) Andy Lang	6
(Switzerland) Peter de Cruz	5
(Russia) Alexey Tselousov	3
(Switzerland) Meico Öhninger	5

Semifinals
(Germany) Andy Lang	5
(Switzerland) Meico Öhninger	3

Qualifier 5
(Germany) Andy Lang	7
(Switzerland) Bernard Werthemann	1

Third Knockout
(Switzerland) Alexander Attinger	7
(Sweden) Niklas Edin	8

Quarterfinals
(Scotland) Grant Hardie	3
(France) Thomas Dufour	8
(Switzerland) Manuel Ruch	7
(Sweden) Niklas Edin	1

Semifinals
(Switzerland) Marc Pfister	3
(France) Thomas Dufour	7
(Czech Republic) Jiří Snítil	1
(Switzerland) Manuel Ruch	6

Qualifier 6
(France) Thomas Dufour	6
(Switzerland) Manuel Ruch	5

Third Knockout
(Switzerland) Stefan Häsler	3
(Sweden) Marcus Hasselborg	4

Quarterfinals
(Switzerland) Pascal Hess	6
(Sweden) Marcus Hasselborg	4
(Switzerland) Benno Arnold	5
(Scotland) Logan Gray	6

Semifinals
(Norway) Thomas Ulsrud	7
(Switzerland) Pascal Hess	4
(Scotland) Tom Brewster	5
(Scotland) Logan Gray	4

Qualifier 7
(Norway) Thomas Ulsrud	5
(Scotland) Tom Brewster	1

Third Knockout
(Russia) Evgeny Arkhipov	4
(Austria) Andreas Unterberger	5
(Switzerland) Michael Schifferli	1
(Finland) Tomi Rantamäki	5

Quarterfinals
(Italy) Marco Pascale	5
(Austria) Andreas Unterberger	3
(Switzerland) Roman Ruch	3
(Finland) Tomi Rantamäki	4

Semifinals
(Italy) Marco Pascale	6
(Finland) Tomi Rantamäki	9

Qualifier 8
(Finland) Tomi Rantamäki	4
(Switzerland) Mario Freiberger	7

== Playoffs ==
Quarterfinals
(Sweden) Oskar Eriksson	8
(Switzerland) Mario Freiberger	5
(Canada) Mark Dacey	6
(Norway) Thomas Ulsrud	5
(Germany) John Jahr	6
(Germany) Andy Lang	7
(Switzerland) Sven Michel	8
(France) Thomas Dufour	0

Semifinals
(Sweden) Oskar Eriksson	7
(Canada) Mark Dacey	1
(Germany) Andy Lang	2
(Switzerland) Sven Michel	4

Final
(Sweden) Oskar Eriksson	5
(Switzerland) Sven Michel	4
