= Daniel Widmer (curler) =

Swiss curler

- Curler ♂

Team
- Curling club: Basel-Ysfäger CC, Basel

Curling career
- Member Association: Switzerland
- World Championship: 1 (2004)
- European Championship: 1 (2003)
Medal record
Curling
Swiss Men's Championship
Gold medal – first place	2003

Daniel Widmer is a Swiss curler.

At the national level, he is a 2003 Swiss men's champion curler.

== Teams ==
Season	Skip	Third	Second	Lead	Alternate	Coach	Events
2002–03	Bernhard Werthemann	Thomas Lips	Thomas Hoch	Daniel Widmer	Stefan Traub		SMCC 2003 (gold)
2003–04	Bernhard Werthemann	Thomas Lips	Thomas Hoch	Daniel Widmer	Stefan Traub	Didier Chabloz	ECC 2003 (4th)
2003–04	Bernhard Werthemann	Thomas Lips	Daniel Widmer	Thomas Hoch	Stefan Traub	Didier Chabloz	WCC 2004 (6th)
2006–07	Thomas Hoch	Daniel Widmer	Albi Wuhrmann	Felix Bader	Andreas Meyer		
2008–09	Bernhard Werthemann	Martin Zaugg	Daniel Widmer	Thomas Hoch			
2009–10	Bernhard Werthemann	Thomas Hoch	Daniel Widmer	Patrick Glanzmann			SMCC 2010 (8th)
2010–11	Bernhard Werthemann	Roger Stucki	Daniel Widmer	Bastian Brun			SMCC 2011 (6th)
2011–12	Bernhard Werthemann	Bastian Brun	Daniel Widmer	Roger Stucki			
2011–12	Bernhard Werthemann	Bastian Brun	Daniel Widmer	Raphael Brütsch			SMCC 2012 (6th)
