= Stefan Traub =

Swiss male curler

- Curler ♂
- Born: 20 March 1969 (age 57)

Team
- Curling club: Basel-Ysfäger CC, Basel

Curling career
- Member Association: Switzerland
- World Championship: 1 (2004)
- European Championship: 1 (2003)
- Other appearances: World Junior Championships: 2 (1989, 1990)
Medal record
Curling
Swiss Men's Championship
Gold medal – first place	2003
World Junior Championships
Gold medal – first place	1990 Portage la Prairie
Bronze medal – third place	1989 Markham

Stefan Traub (born 20 March 1969) is a Swiss curler.

At the national level, he is a 2003 Swiss men's champion curler and a 1990 Swiss junior champion curler.

== Teams ==
Season	Skip	Third	Second	Lead	Alternate	Coach	Events
1988–89	Markus Eggler	Marc Haudenschild	Frank Kobel	Reto Huber	Stefan Traub		WJCC 1989 (bronze)
1989–90	Stefan Traub	Andreas Östreich	Markus Widmer	Roland Müggler			SJCC 1990 (gold); WJCC 1990 (gold)
1996–97	Stefan Traub	Roland Müggler	Didier Chabloz	Jerome Chabloz			
2002–03	Bernhard Werthemann	Thomas Lips	Thomas Hoch	Daniel Widmer	Stefan Traub		SMCC 2003 (gold)
2003–04	Stefan Traub	Mario Gross	Didier Chabloz	Hans-Martin Moser			
2003–04	Bernhard Werthemann	Thomas Lips	Thomas Hoch	Daniel Widmer	Stefan Traub	Didier Chabloz	ECC 2003 (4th)
2003–04	Bernhard Werthemann	Thomas Lips	Daniel Widmer	Thomas Hoch	Stefan Traub	Didier Chabloz	WCC 2004 (6th)
2004–05	Bernhard Werthemann	Thomas Lips	Stefan Traub	Thomas Hoch			SMCC 2005 (5th)
2005–06	Thomas Hoch	Stefan Traub	Albi Wuhrmann	Felix Bader	Pascal Martin		
2010–11	Andreas Östreich	Stefan Traub	Andreas Meyer	Christian Herzog			
