= Julien Charlet =

French curler and coach

- Curler ♂

Team
- Curling club: Chamonix CC

Curling career
- Member Association: France
- World Championship: 1 (2004)
- European Championship: 2 (2002, 2003)
- Other appearances: World Junior Championships: 1 (2001)

Julien Charlet is a French curler and curling coach.

== Teams ==
Season	Skip	Third	Second	Lead	Alternate	Coach	Events
2000–01	Richard Ducroz	Raphaël Mathieu	Julien Charlet	Tony Angiboust	Jérémy Frarier	Thomas Dufour	WJCC 2001 (10th)
2002–03	Dominique Dupont-Roc	Jan Henri Ducroz	Spencer Mugnier	Philippe Caux	Julien Charlet		ECC 2002 (9th)
2003–04	Thomas Dufour	Philippe Caux	Lionel Roux	Tony Angiboust	Julien Charlet	Hervé Poirot (ECC, WCC); Bruno-Denis Dubois (WCC)	ECC 2003 (7th); WCC 2004 (10th)
2005–06	Thomas Dufour	Philippe Caux	Tony Angiboust	Julien Charlet			

== Record as a coach of national teams ==
Year	Tournament, event	National team	Place
2007	2007 European Curling Championships	France (women)	13
2008	2008 European Curling Championships	France (women)	20
