= 2014 European Curling Championships – Men's tournament =

2014 European Curling Championships Men's tournament
- Host city: Champéry, Switzerland
- Arena: Palladium de Champéry
- Dates: November 22–29
- Winner: Sweden
- Curling club: Karlstads CK, Karlstad
- Skip: Niklas Edin
- Third: Oskar Eriksson
- Second: Kristian Lindström
- Lead: Christoffer Sundgren
- Alternate: Henrik Leek
- Coach: Peja Lindholm
- Finalist: Norway (Thomas Ulsrud)

The men's tournament of the 2014 European Curling Championships was held from November 22 to 29 at the Palladium de Champéry in Champéry, Switzerland. The winners of the Group C tournament in Zoetermeer, the Netherlands will move on to the Group B tournament. The top eight men's teams at the 2014 European Curling Championships will represent their respective nations at the 2015 Ford World Men's Curling Championship in Halifax, Nova Scotia, Canada.

== Group A ==
=== Teams ===
The teams are listed as follows:

Czech Republic	Denmark	Germany	Italy	Latvia
Skip: Jiří Snítil; Third: Lukáš Klíma; Second: Martin Snítil; Lead: Jindřich Kitzberger; Alternate: Samiel Mokriš	Skip: Rasmus Stjerne; Third: Mikkel Krause; Second: Oliver Dupont; Lead: Troels Harry; Alternate: Martin Grønbech	Skip: Alexander Baumann; Third: Manuel Walter; Second: Marc Muskatewitz; Lead: Sebastian Schweizer; Alternate: Jörg Engesser	Fourth: Amos Mosaner; Skip: Joël Retornaz; Second: Daniele Ferrazza; Lead: Andrea Pilzer; Alternate: Sebastiano Arman	Skip: Ritvars Gulbis; Third: Normunds Šaršūns; Second: Aivars Avotiņš; Lead: Artürs Gerhards; Alternate: Janis Klive
Norway	Russia	Scotland	Sweden	Switzerland
Skip: Thomas Ulsrud; Third: Torger Nergård; Second: Christoffer Svae; Lead: Håvard Vad Petersson; Alternate: Sander Rølvåg	Skip: Evgeniy Arkhipov; Third: Alexander Kozyrev; Second: Artur Razhabov; Lead: Anton Kalalb; Alternate: Alexey Stukalskiy	Skip: David Edwards; Third: John Penny; Second: Scott Macleod; Lead: Billy Morton; Alternate: Tom Brewster	Skip: Niklas Edin; Third: Oskar Eriksson; Second: Kristian Lindström; Lead: Christoffer Sundgren; Alternate: Henrik Leek	Skip: Sven Michel; Third: Florian Meister; Second: Simon Gempeler; Lead: Stefan Meienberg; Alternate: Marc Pfister

=== Round-robin standings ===
Final round-robin standings

Key
Teams to Playoffs
Teams to Tiebreaker
Teams relegated to 2015 Group B

Country	Skip	W	L	PF	PA	Ends Won	Ends Lost	Blank Ends	Stolen Ends	Shot Pct.
Sweden	Niklas Edin	9	0	68	45	36	34	12	4	86%
Italy	Joël Retornaz	7	2	61	50	35	31	15	9	80%
Switzerland	Sven Michel	6	3	53	52	32	36	19	4	81%
Norway	Thomas Ulsrud	5	4	61	48	37	32	13	9	84%
Czech Republic	Jiří Snítil	5	4	52	46	38	32	19	5	79%
Russia	Evgeniy Arkhipov	5	4	52	53	33	33	16	5	82%
Germany	Alexander Baumann	3	6	52	54	33	38	11	5	79%
Scotland	David Edwards	3	6	56	63	35	39	14	8	77%
Denmark	Rasmus Stjerne	1	8	47	62	36	39	12	7	74%
Latvia	Ritvars Gulbis	1	8	41	70	32	34	14	6	74%

Russia were eliminated from the tiebreaker by virtue of their head-to-head record against the other teams.

=== Round-robin results ===
All draw times are listed in Central European Time (UTC+1).

==== Draw 1 ====
Saturday, November 22, 11:00

Sheet A	1	2	3	4	5	6	7	8	9	10	Final
Italy (Retornaz)	0	0	2	0	0	0	X	X	X	X	2
Sweden (Edin)	0	3	0	0	4	1	X	X	X	X	8

Sheet B	1	2	3	4	5	6	7	8	9	10	Final
Denmark (Stjerne)	1	2	0	0	1	0	1	0	0	1	6
Germany (Baumann)	0	0	3	1	0	1	0	0	3	0	8

Sheet C	1	2	3	4	5	6	7	8	9	10	Final
Scotland (Edwards)	0	0	3	0	0	1	0	3	0	1	8
Norway (Ulsrud)	2	0	0	1	0	0	1	0	2	0	6

Sheet D	1	2	3	4	5	6	7	8	9	10	Final
Latvia (Gulbis)	0	0	0	1	0	0	0	1	0	X	2
Czech Republic (Snítil)	0	2	0	0	3	0	0	0	1	X	6

Sheet E	1	2	3	4	5	6	7	8	9	10	Final
Switzerland (Michel)	0	0	0	0	0	2	0	2	0	2	6
Russia (Arkhipov)	0	0	0	1	0	0	2	0	2	0	5

==== Draw 2 ====
Saturday, November 22, 19:00

Sheet A	1	2	3	4	5	6	7	8	9	10	Final
Germany (Baumann)	3	1	0	0	2	0	2	X	X	X	8
Latvia (Gulbis)	0	0	1	0	0	1	0	X	X	X	2

Sheet B	1	2	3	4	5	6	7	8	9	10	Final
Sweden (Edin)	1	0	1	0	0	0	3	0	0	0	5
Czech Republic (Snítil)	0	1	0	1	0	0	0	0	1	1	4

Sheet C	1	2	3	4	5	6	7	8	9	10	Final
Switzerland (Michel)	0	0	0	2	0	1	0	0	1	X	4
Italy (Retornaz)	1	0	0	0	1	0	3	2	0	X	7

Sheet D	1	2	3	4	5	6	7	8	9	10	Final
Russia (Arkhipov)	0	0	0	0	0	1	0	X	X	X	1
Norway (Ulsrud)	3	0	0	0	2	0	3	X	X	X	8

Sheet E	1	2	3	4	5	6	7	8	9	10	Final
Denmark (Stjerne)	1	0	0	0	0	2	1	1	0	0	5
Scotland (Edwards)	0	0	0	2	2	0	0	0	2	1	7

==== Draw 3 ====
Sunday, November 23, 12:00

Sheet A	1	2	3	4	5	6	7	8	9	10	Final
Norway (Ulsrud)	0	0	2	1	0	1	1	0	0	1	6
Denmark (Stjerne)	1	1	0	0	1	0	0	1	0	0	4

Sheet B	1	2	3	4	5	6	7	8	9	10	Final
Italy (Retornaz)	0	0	2	0	0	0	2	1	0	0	5
Russia (Arkhipov)	1	0	0	1	1	0	0	0	2	1	6

Sheet C	1	2	3	4	5	6	7	8	9	10	Final
Sweden (Edin)	0	3	0	3	0	1	0	0	0	X	7
Latvia (Gulbis)	1	0	1	0	1	0	1	0	1	X	5

Sheet D	1	2	3	4	5	6	7	8	9	10	Final
Scotland (Edwards)	1	0	0	1	0	0	0	2	1	0	5
Switzerland (Michel)	0	0	1	0	0	1	2	0	0	4	8

Sheet E	1	2	3	4	5	6	7	8	9	10	Final
Germany (Baumann)	1	0	1	0	1	0	0	2	0	0	5
Czech Republic (Snítil)	0	2	0	2	0	1	0	0	0	1	6

==== Draw 4 ====
Sunday, November 23, 20:00

Sheet A	1	2	3	4	5	6	7	8	9	10	Final
Czech Republic (Snítil)	0	0	1	0	0	1	0	1	2	0	5
Switzerland (Michel)	0	1	0	3	0	0	2	0	0	1	7

Sheet B	1	2	3	4	5	6	7	8	9	10	Final
Scotland (Edwards)	0	4	0	0	0	1	0	0	0	1	6
Latvia (Gulbis)	1	0	2	0	1	0	2	1	1	0	8

Sheet C	1	2	3	4	5	6	7	8	9	10	Final
Russia (Arkhipov)	1	0	2	1	0	1	0	0	0	1	6
Germany (Baumann)	0	1	0	0	1	0	0	1	1	0	4

Sheet D	1	2	3	4	5	6	7	8	9	10	Final
Norway (Ulsrud)	0	1	0	0	2	0	0	2	0	X	5
Italy (Retornaz)	2	0	1	2	0	3	0	0	1	X	9

Sheet E	1	2	3	4	5	6	7	8	9	10	Final
Sweden (Edin)	2	0	0	1	2	0	0	2	X	X	7
Denmark (Stjerne)	0	0	1	0	0	1	0	0	X	X	2

==== Draw 5 ====
Monday, November 24, 14:00

Sheet A	1	2	3	4	5	6	7	8	9	10	Final
Scotland (Edwards)	0	0	0	1	0	2	1	0	0	X	4
Germany (Baumann)	1	0	1	0	1	0	0	0	4	X	7

Sheet B	1	2	3	4	5	6	7	8	9	10	Final
Switzerland (Michel)	2	0	1	0	0	1	0	1	0	0	5
Sweden (Edin)	0	3	0	2	0	0	2	0	0	1	8

Sheet C	1	2	3	4	5	6	7	8	9	10	Final
Italy (Retornaz)	0	2	0	0	3	0	1	0	1	0	7
Czech Republic (Snítil)	2	0	1	0	0	1	0	1	0	1	6

Sheet D	1	2	3	4	5	6	7	8	9	10	Final
Denmark (Stjerne)	0	1	0	3	0	0	1	0	1	X	6
Russia (Arkhipov)	1	0	2	0	0	3	0	2	0	X	8

Sheet E	1	2	3	4	5	6	7	8	9	10	Final
Latvia (Gulbis)	0	2	0	0	1	0	1	0	1	X	5
Norway (Ulsrud)	2	0	0	3	0	1	0	2	0	X	8

==== Draw 6 ====
Tuesday, November 25, 8:00

Sheet A	1	2	3	4	5	6	7	8	9	10	Final
Switzerland (Michel)	0	0	1	0	0	0	2	0	0	X	3
Norway (Ulsrud)	2	0	0	2	2	0	0	0	1	X	7

Sheet B	1	2	3	4	5	6	7	8	9	10	Final
Germany (Baumann)	2	0	0	1	0	2	0	0	2	0	7
Italy (Retornaz)	0	0	1	0	2	0	2	1	0	2	8

Sheet C	1	2	3	4	5	6	7	8	9	10	Final
Latvia (Gulbis)	0	3	0	1	0	0	1	0	0	1	6
Denmark (Stjerne)	2	0	2	0	1	0	0	1	2	0	8

Sheet D	1	2	3	4	5	6	7	8	9	10	Final
Czech Republic (Snítil)	1	0	2	0	1	0	1	0	0	0	5
Scotland (Edwards)	0	1	0	2	0	1	0	0	1	1	6

Sheet E	1	2	3	4	5	6	7	8	9	10	Final
Russia (Arkhipov)	0	1	0	1	0	1	0	1	0	X	4
Sweden (Edin)	0	0	1	0	1	0	4	0	1	X	7

==== Draw 7 ====
Tuesday, November 25, 16:00

Sheet A	1	2	3	4	5	6	7	8	9	10	Final
Denmark (Stjerne)	0	0	0	1	0	1	0	1	0	0	3
Czech Republic (Snítil)	1	1	0	0	2	0	0	0	0	1	5

Sheet B	1	2	3	4	5	6	7	8	9	10	Final
Russia (Arkhipov)	1	0	1	0	0	3	0	0	0	1	6
Scotland (Edwards)	0	0	0	1	0	0	2	1	1	0	5

Sheet C	1	2	3	4	5	6	7	8	9	10	Final
Norway (Ulsrud)	1	0	2	1	0	0	1	0	1	0	6
Sweden (Edin)	0	1	0	0	1	1	0	2	0	2	7

Sheet D	1	2	3	4	5	6	7	8	9	10	Final
Switzerland (Michel)	0	1	1	0	2	0	0	2	0	X	6
Germany (Baumann)	1	0	0	2	0	0	1	0	0	X	4

Sheet E	1	2	3	4	5	6	7	8	9	10	Final
Italy (Retornaz)	0	0	3	0	3	0	0	2	X	X	8
Latvia (Gulbis)	0	0	0	0	0	1	1	0	X	X	2

==== Draw 8 ====
Wednesday, November 26, 9:00

Sheet A	1	2	3	4	5	6	7	8	9	10	Final
Sweden (Edin)	1	0	2	0	2	0	0	3	0	3	11
Scotland (Edwards)	0	3	0	1	0	2	2	0	2	0	10

Sheet B	1	2	3	4	5	6	7	8	9	10	Final
Latvia (Gulbis)	0	1	0	0	2	1	0	0	1	0	5
Switzerland (Michel)	2	0	2	0	0	0	2	0	0	1	7

Sheet C	1	2	3	4	5	6	7	8	9	10	Final
Czech Republic (Snítil)	1	0	1	0	2	0	0	0	1	1	6
Russia (Arkhipov)	0	2	0	1	0	1	0	0	0	0	4

Sheet D	1	2	3	4	5	6	7	8	9	10	Final
Italy (Retornaz)	1	0	2	0	0	2	0	1	1	1	8
Denmark (Stjerne)	0	2	0	0	2	0	3	0	0	0	7

Sheet E	1	2	3	4	5	6	7	8	9	10	Final
Norway (Ulsrud)	1	0	2	3	0	1	1	X	X	X	8
Germany (Baumann)	0	1	0	0	1	0	0	X	X	X	2

==== Draw 9 ====
Wednesday, November 26, 19:00

Sheet A	1	2	3	4	5	6	7	8	9	10	Final
Latvia (Gulbis)	0	2	0	2	0	2	0	X	X	X	6
Russia (Arkhipov)	2	0	4	0	1	0	5	X	X	X	12

Sheet B	1	2	3	4	5	6	7	8	9	10	11	Final
Czech Republic (Snítil)	0	2	0	2	0	0	0	2	0	1	2	9
Norway (Ulsrud)	2	0	2	0	1	0	0	0	2	0	0	7

Sheet C	1	2	3	4	5	6	7	8	9	10	Final
Denmark (Stjerne)	1	0	0	1	1	0	1	0	1	1	6
Switzerland (Michel)	0	1	2	0	0	2	0	2	0	0	7

Sheet D	1	2	3	4	5	6	7	8	9	10	Final
Germany (Baumann)	0	0	2	0	0	2	1	0	2	0	7
Sweden (Edin)	2	1	0	0	3	0	0	1	0	1	8

Sheet E	1	2	3	4	5	6	7	8	9	10	Final
Scotland (Edwards)	0	1	0	0	2	0	0	2	0	X	5
Italy (Retornaz)	1	0	3	0	0	1	0	0	2	X	7

=== Placement game ===
Thursday, November 27, 14:00

Sheet B	1	2	3	4	5	6	7	8	9	10	Final
Germany (Baumann)	2	0	1	0	0	0	0	2	0	1	6
Scotland (Edwards)	0	1	0	2	1	1	2	0	1	0	8

Scotland qualifies for World Championships
Germany to play in World Challenge Games

=== World Challenge Games ===
The World Challenge Games are held between the eighth-ranked team in the Group A round robin and the winner of the Group B tournament to determine which of these two teams will play at the World Championships.

==== Challenge 1 ====
Friday, November 28, 19:30

Team	1	2	3	4	5	6	7	8	9	10	Final
Germany (Baumann)	0	0	0	0	1	2	0	0	2	X	5
Finland (Kauste)	0	1	3	0	0	0	2	2	0	X	8

==== Challenge 2 ====
Saturday, November 29, 9:00

Team	1	2	3	4	5	6	7	8	9	10	11	Final
Germany (Baumann)	1	0	2	0	1	0	0	1	0	2	0	7
Finland (Kauste)	0	1	0	1	0	2	1	0	2	0	1	8

=== Tiebreaker ===
Thursday, November 27, 14:00

Sheet D	1	2	3	4	5	6	7	8	9	10	Final
Czech Republic (Snítil)	0	0	1	0	1	0	2	0	0	X	4
Norway (Ulsrud)	1	0	0	2	0	1	0	0	2	X	6

Player percentages
Czech Republic		Norway	
Jindřich Kitzberger	73%	Håvard Vad Petersson	88%
Martin Snítil	88%	Christoffer Svae	91%
Lukáš Klima	74%	Torger Nergård	84%
Jiří Snítil	72%	Thomas Ulsrud	84%
Total	77%	Total	87%

=== Playoffs ===
Page playoff system
1	Sweden	6
2	Italy	2
3	Switzerland	2
4	Norway	5

Semifinal
2	Italy	6
4	Norway	7

Final
1	Sweden	5
4	Norway	4

Bronze-medal game
3	Switzerland	8
2	Italy	6

==== 1 vs. 2 ====
Thursday, November 27, 19:00

Team	1	2	3	4	5	6	7	8	9	10	Final
Sweden (Edin)	0	0	4	1	0	1	0	0	X	X	6
Italy (Retornaz)	0	0	0	0	1	0	0	1	X	X	2

Player percentages
Sweden		Italy	
Christoffer Sundgren	91%	Andrea Pilzer	92%
Kristian Lindström	91%	Sebastiano Arman	84%
Oskar Eriksson	81%	Joël Retornaz	69%
Niklas Edin	95%	Amos Mosaner	80%
Total	90%	Total	81%

==== 3 vs. 4 ====
Thursday, November 27, 19:00

Team	1	2	3	4	5	6	7	8	9	10	Final
Switzerland (Michel)	0	1	0	0	0	0	1	0	0	X	2
Norway (Ulsrud)	0	0	2	1	0	1	0	0	1	X	5

Player percentages
Switzerland		Norway	
Stefan Meienberg	86%	Håvard Vad Petersson	83%
Simon Gempeler	80%	Christoffer Svae	89%
Florian Meister	68%	Torger Nergård	90%
Sven Michel	69%	Thomas Ulsrud	93%
Total	76%	Total	89%

==== Semifinal ====
Friday, November 28, 13:00

Team	1	2	3	4	5	6	7	8	9	10	Final
Italy (Retornaz)	0	0	0	1	0	2	0	0	2	1	6
Norway (Ulsrud)	1	0	1	0	3	0	1	1	0	0	7

Player percentages
Italy		Norway	
Andrea Pilzer	81%	Håvard Vad Petersson	97%
Sebastiano Arman	80%	Christoffer Svae	85%
Joël Retornaz	78%	Torger Nergård	89%
Amos Mosaner	70%	Thomas Ulsrud	83%
Total	77%	Total	88%

==== Bronze-medal game ====
Friday, November 28, 19:30

Team	1	2	3	4	5	6	7	8	9	10	Final
Switzerland (Michel)	1	0	2	0	0	2	0	2	0	1	8
Italy (Retornaz)	0	1	0	1	1	0	2	0	1	0	6

Player percentages
Switzerland		Italy	
Stefan Meienberg	84%	Andrea Pilzer	86%
Simon Gempeler	71%	Sebastiano Arman	85%
Florian Meister	71%	Joël Retornaz	73%
Sven Michel	83%	Amos Mosaner	75%
Total	77%	Total	80%

==== Gold-medal game ====
Saturday, November 29, 15:00

Sheet C	1	2	3	4	5	6	7	8	9	10	11	Final
Sweden (Edin)	0	0	0	2	0	0	1	0	1	0	1	5
Norway (Ulsrud)	0	0	0	0	0	1	0	2	0	1	0	4

Player percentages
Sweden		Norway	
Christoffer Sundgren	91%	Håvard Vad Petersson	98%
Kristian Lindström	86%	Christoffer Svae	72%
Oskar Eriksson	76%	Torger Nergård	85%
Niklas Edin	86%	Thomas Ulsrud	90%
Total	85%	Total	86%

=== Player percentages ===
Round Robin only

Leads	%
(Russia) Anton Kalalb	88
(Sweden) Christoffer Sundgren	87
(Norway) Håvard Vad Petersson	87
(Scotland) Billy Morton	83
(Switzerland) Stefan Meienberg	82

Seconds	%
(Sweden) Kristian Lindström	87
(Norway) Christoffer Svae	84
(Russia) Artur Razhabov	83
(Czech Republic) Martin Snítil	83
(Switzerland) Simon Gempeler	82

Thirds	%
(Sweden) Oskar Eriksson	86
(Norway) Torger Nergård	83
(Germany) Manuel Walter	82
(Switzerland) Florian Meister	81
(Italy) Joel Retornaz	81

Skips/Fourths	%
(Sweden) Niklas Edin	83
(Norway) Thomas Ulsrud	83
(Italy) Amos Mosaner	80
(Czech Republic) Jiri Snítil	80
(Switzerland) Sven Michel	79

== Group B ==
=== Teams ===
==== Group A ====
Croatia	England	Estonia	France
Skip: Alen Čadež; Third: Dražen Ćutić; Second: Ognjen Golubić; Lead: Robert Mikulandrić; Alternate: Mislav Martinić	Skip: Alan MacDougall; Third: Andrew Reed; Second: Andrew Woolston; Lead: Tom Jaeggi; Alternate: Ben Fowler	Skip: Martin Lill; Third: Harri Lill; Second: Siim Sildnik; Lead: Fred Randver; Alternate: Robert-Kent Päll	Skip: Lionel Roux; Third: Jérémy Frarier; Second: Romain Borini; Lead: Herve Poirot; Alternate: Thierry Mercier
Israel	Lithuania	Netherlands	Turkey
Skip: Adam Freilich; Third: Yuval Grinspun; Second: Jeffrey Lutz; Lead: Gabriel Kempenich; Alternate: Gilad Kempenich	Skip: Mantas Kulakauskas; Third: Konstantin Rykov; Second: Tadas Vyskupaitis; Lead: Vytis Kulakauskas; Alternate: Mantas Bielinis	Skip: Jaap van Dorp; Third: Carlo Glasbergen; Second: Wouter Gösgens; Lead: Joey Bruinsma; Alternate: Laurens Hoekman	Skip: Alican Karataş; Third: Kadir Çakır; Second: Muhammet Oǧuz Zengin; Lead: Bilal Ömer Çakır; Alternate: Melik Şenol

==== Group B ====
Austria	Belgium	Finland	Hungary
Skip: Sebastian Wunderer; Third: Mathias Genner; Second: Martin Reichel; Lead: Markus Forejtek; Alternate: Felix Purzner	Skip: Timothy Verreycken; Third: Dirk Heylen; Second: Walter Verbueken; Lead: Gregory Janbroers; Alternate: Tom van Waterschoot	Skip: Aku Kauste; Third: Kasper Hakunti; Second: Pauli Jäämies; Lead: Janne Pitko; Alternate: Leo Mäkelä	Skip: Krisztian Hall; Third: Gabor Ezsöl; Second: Lajos Belleli; Lead: Joszef Nyitrai; Alternate: Balazs Foti
Poland	Romania	Spain	Wales
Skip: Borys Jasiecki; Third: Krzysztof Domin; Second: Bartosz Lobaza; Lead: Marcin Cieminski; Alternate: Maciej Kolodziej	Skip: Allen Coliban; Third: Bogdan Colceriu; Second: Bogdan Taut; Lead: Cristian Matau	Skip: Carles de Moxo; Third: Jordi Divi; Second: Jordi Mas; Lead: Eduard Ferrer; Alternate: Carlos Lorente	Skip: James Pougher; Third: Garry Coombs; Second: Rhys Phillips; Lead: Simon Pougher; Alternate: Adrian Meikle

=== Round-robin standings ===
Final round-robin standings

Key
Teams to Playoffs
Teams to Tiebreaker
Teams relegated to 2015 Group C

Group A	Skip	W	L
England	Alan MacDougall	6	1
Netherlands	Jaap van Dorp	6	1
Croatia	Alen Čadež	4	3
Turkey	Alican Karataş	4	3
Estonia	Martin Lill	4	3
Israel	Adam Freilich	3	4
Lithuania	Mantas Kulakauskas	1	6
France	Lionel Roux	0	7

Group B	Skip	W	L
Finland	Aku Kauste	6	1
Hungary	Krisztian Hall	5	2
Austria	Sebastian Wunderer	5	2
Belgium	Timothy Verreycken	4	3
Wales	James Pougher	4	3
Poland	Borys Jasiecki	3	4
Spain	Carles de Moxo	1	6
Romania	Allen Coliban	0	7

Team France did not attend the Group B tournament, and were given automatic forfeits for each of their games.

=== Round-robin results ===
All draw times are listed in Central European Time (UTC+1).

==== Draw 1 ====
Saturday, November 22, 8:00

Sheet A	1	2	3	4	5	6	7	8	9	10	Final
Netherlands (van Dorp)	2	0	0	0	2	0	0	4	0	X	8
Croatia (Čadež)	0	1	1	0	0	0	1	0	0	X	3

Sheet B	1	2	3	4	5	6	7	8	9	10	Final
Estonia (Lill)	0	2	2	0	3	0	1	2	X	X	10
Israel (Freilich)	2	0	0	1	0	2	0	0	X	X	5

Sheet C	1	2	3	4	5	6	7	8	9	10	Final
Lithuania (Kulakauskas)	0	0	1	0	0	1	0	1	0	X	3
England (MacDougall)	1	1	0	0	2	0	1	0	2	X	7

Sheet D	Final
France (Roux)	L
Turkey (Karataş)	W

Sheet E	1	2	3	4	5	6	7	8	9	10	Final
Finland (Kauste)	4	1	0	0	4	0	0	2	X	X	11
Belgium (Verryecken)	0	0	1	1	0	1	1	0	X	X	4

Sheet F	1	2	3	4	5	6	7	8	9	10	Final
Austria (Wunderer)	0	0	1	0	1	0	0	0	0	X	2
Hungary (Hall)	1	0	0	2	0	1	2	0	1	X	7

==== Draw 2 ====
Saturday, November 22, 16:00

Sheet A	1	2	3	4	5	6	7	8	9	10	Final
Hungary (Hall)	0	4	3	0	4	1	X	X	X	X	11
Spain (de Moxo)	0	0	0	1	0	0	X	X	X	X	1

Sheet B	1	2	3	4	5	6	7	8	9	10	Final
Poland (Jasiecki)	0	1	1	0	1	2	0	0	2	0	7
Austria (Wunderer)	2	0	0	2	0	0	3	0	0	1	8

Sheet C	1	2	3	4	5	6	7	8	9	10	Final
Romania (Coliban)	0	1	1	0	0	1	0	1	1	0	5
Belgium (Verryecken)	1	0	0	4	1	0	1	0	0	1	8

Sheet D	1	2	3	4	5	6	7	8	9	10	Final
Wales (Pougher)	0	1	0	0	0	2	0	0	2	1	6
Finland (Kauste)	1	0	0	0	4	0	0	0	0	0	5

Sheet E	1	2	3	4	5	6	7	8	9	10	Final
Israel (Freilich)	1	0	2	1	1	0	0	0	0	2	7
Lithuania (Kulakauskas)	0	1	0	0	0	1	2	1	1	0	6

Sheet F	Final
France (Roux)	L
England (MacDougall)	W

==== Draw 3 ====
Sunday, November 23, 9:00

Sheet A	Final
Israel (Freilich)	W
France (Roux)	L

Sheet B	1	2	3	4	5	6	7	8	9	10	Final
England (MacDougall)	1	0	0	2	0	2	0	1	0	1	7
Netherlands (van Dorp)	0	0	1	0	2	0	1	0	1	0	5

Sheet C	1	2	3	4	5	6	7	8	9	10	11	Final
Turkey (Karataş)	1	0	2	0	0	2	2	0	0	0	0	7
Croatia (Čadež)	0	1	0	1	2	0	0	1	1	1	2	9

Sheet D	1	2	3	4	5	6	7	8	9	10	Final
Estonia (Lill)	3	0	0	3	0	0	2	1	0	0	9
Lithuania (Kulakauskas)	0	0	2	0	1	1	0	0	2	2	8

Sheet E	1	2	3	4	5	6	7	8	9	10	Final
Spain (de Moxo)	0	0	1	1	1	0	2	0	0	0	5
Poland (Jasiecki)	1	0	0	0	0	2	0	2	2	1	8

Sheet F	1	2	3	4	5	6	7	8	9	10	Final
Wales (Pougher)	0	4	1	1	0	4	1	X	X	X	11
Romania (Coliban)	2	0	0	0	1	0	0	X	X	X	3

==== Draw 4 ====
Sunday, November 23, 19:00

Sheet A	1	2	3	4	5	6	7	8	9	10	11	Final
Finland (Kauste)	1	0	1	0	1	1	0	3	0	0	2	9
Austria (Wunderer)	0	0	0	2	0	0	2	0	2	1	0	7

Sheet B	1	2	3	4	5	6	7	8	9	10	Final
Hungary (Hall)	0	0	0	1	1	0	0	1	0	X	3
Belgium (Verryecken)	1	1	0	0	0	0	4	0	3	X	9

Sheet C	Final
France (Roux)	L
Estonia (Lill)	W

Sheet D	1	2	3	4	5	6	7	8	9	10	Final
Spain (de Moxo)	3	1	0	1	0	2	0	1	1	X	9
Romania (Coliban)	0	0	3	0	1	0	0	0	0	X	4

Sheet E	1	2	3	4	5	6	7	8	9	10	Final
Netherlands (van Dorp)	2	0	0	1	0	1	0	3	0	X	7
Israel (Freilich)	0	0	1	0	2	0	1	0	1	X	5

Sheet F	1	2	3	4	5	6	7	8	9	10	Final
Lithuania (Kulakauskas)	0	0	0	1	1	0	0	0	X	X	2
Turkey (Karataş)	0	2	1	0	0	4	1	1	X	X	9

==== Draw 5 ====
Monday, November 24, 8:00

Sheet D	1	2	3	4	5	6	7	8	9	10	Final
Croatia (Čadež)	0	1	2	0	0	1	0	0	1	1	6
England (MacDougall)	1	0	0	2	1	0	2	1	0	0	7

==== Draw 6 ====
Monday, November 24, 12:00

Sheet A	1	2	3	4	5	6	7	8	9	10	Final
Poland (Jasiecki)	0	0	0	3	0	0	3	0	1	X	7
Romania (Coliban)	1	0	0	0	0	2	0	1	0	X	4

Sheet B	1	2	3	4	5	6	7	8	9	10	Final
Spain (de Moxo)	0	1	0	1	0	1	0	X	X	X	3
Wales (Pougher)	4	0	1	0	3	0	4	X	X	X	12

Sheet C	1	2	3	4	5	6	7	8	9	10	Final
Hungary (Hall)	0	0	0	0	1	0	0	1	0	X	2
Finland (Kauste)	1	2	2	1	0	0	1	0	1	X	8

Sheet D	1	2	3	4	5	6	7	8	9	10	Final
Belgium (Verryecken)	1	0	0	2	0	1	0	0	1	X	5
Austria (Wunderer)	0	2	1	0	2	0	3	0	0	X	8

Sheet E	Final
Lithuania (Kulakauskas)	W
France (Roux)	L

Sheet F	1	2	3	4	5	6	7	8	9	10	Final
Estonia (Lill)	0	1	0	0	1	0	2	0	0	X	4
Netherlands (van Dorp)	1	0	0	2	0	1	0	0	2	X	6

==== Draw 7 ====
Monday, November 24, 20:00

Sheet A	1	2	3	4	5	6	7	8	9	10	Final
Belgium (Verryecken)	0	1	0	1	2	0	3	2	0	X	9
Wales (Pougher)	1	0	2	0	0	1	0	0	2	X	6

Sheet B	1	2	3	4	5	6	7	8	9	10	Final
Romania (Coliban)	1	0	0	1	0	1	0	1	0	X	4
Finland (Kauste)	0	3	1	0	3	0	1	0	2	X	10

Sheet C	1	2	3	4	5	6	7	8	9	10	Final
Austria (Wunderer)	1	0	2	2	1	0	3	X	X	X	9
Spain (de Moxo)	0	1	0	0	0	1	0	X	X	X	2

Sheet D	1	2	3	4	5	6	7	8	9	10	Final
Hungary (Hall)	1	0	1	1	0	0	0	2	0	1	6
Poland (Jasiecki)	0	3	0	0	1	1	0	0	0	0	5

Sheet E	1	2	3	4	5	6	7	8	9	10	Final
England (MacDougall)	0	0	2	1	1	0	0	1	0	1	6
Turkey (Karataş)	1	0	0	0	0	1	2	0	1	0	5

Sheet F	1	2	3	4	5	6	7	8	9	10	Final
Israel (Freilich)	0	0	1	0	0	0	1	2	1	0	5
Croatia (Čadež)	2	1	0	1	0	1	0	0	0	1	6

==== Draw 8 ====
Tuesday, November 25, 14:00

Sheet A	1	2	3	4	5	6	7	8	9	10	Final
Estonia (Lill)	0	0	0	1	0	2	0	2	0	0	5
England (MacDougall)	0	2	0	0	1	0	2	0	1	1	7

Sheet B	Final
France (Roux)	L
Croatia (Čadež)	W

Sheet C	1	2	3	4	5	6	7	8	9	10	Final
Netherlands (van Dorp)	1	0	3	0	5	3	X	X	X	X	12
Lithuania (Kulakauskas)	0	1	0	2	0	0	X	X	X	X	3

Sheet D	1	2	3	4	5	6	7	8	9	10	Final
Turkey (Karataş)	0	1	0	1	2	1	0	0	0	2	7
Israel (Freilich)	1	0	0	0	0	0	2	1	2	0	6

Sheet E	1	2	3	4	5	6	7	8	9	10	Final
Wales (Pougher)	0	2	0	0	1	0	0	1	0	X	4
Hungary (Hall)	1	0	2	1	0	2	1	0	1	X	8

Sheet F	1	2	3	4	5	6	7	8	9	10	Final
Finland (Kauste)	0	0	1	1	1	0	1	3	2	X	9
Poland (Jasiecki)	2	1	0	0	0	2	0	0	0	X	5

==== Draw 9 ====
Tuesday, November 25, 19:00

Sheet F	1	2	3	4	5	6	7	8	9	10	11	Final
Belgium (Verryecken)	0	0	3	0	0	0	2	1	1	0	1	8
Spain (de Moxo)	1	1	0	1	1	1	0	0	0	2	0	7

==== Draw 10 ====
Wednesday, November 26, 8:00

Sheet A	1	2	3	4	5	6	7	8	9	10	Final
Croatia (Čadež)	1	0	0	1	0	0	2	1	1	1	7
Lithuania (Kulakauskas)	0	0	1	0	1	2	0	0	0	0	4

Sheet B	1	2	3	4	5	6	7	8	9	10	Final
Turkey (Karataş)	2	0	0	2	0	1	0	2	1	2	10
Estonia (Lill)	0	2	0	0	2	0	2	0	0	0	6

Sheet C	1	2	3	4	5	6	7	8	9	10	Final
Poland (Jasiecki)	0	1	1	0	1	0	2	0	2	0	7
Wales (Pougher)	3	0	0	0	0	3	0	1	0	1	8

Sheet D	Final
Netherlands (van Dorp)	W
France (Roux)	L

Sheet E	1	2	3	4	5	6	7	8	9	10	Final
Austria (Wunderer)	1	1	0	0	4	2	0	1	0	2	11
Romania (Coliban)	0	0	1	3	0	0	2	0	2	0	8

==== Draw 11 ====
Wednesday, November 26, 12:00

Sheet C	1	2	3	4	5	6	7	8	9	10	Final
England (MacDougall)	0	0	1	0	2	0	1	1	0	1	6
Israel (Freilich)	1	2	0	2	0	1	0	0	1	0	7

==== Draw 12 ====
Wednesday, November 26, 16:00

Sheet A	1	2	3	4	5	6	7	8	9	10	11	Final
Turkey (Karataş)	1	0	1	0	1	0	1	0	1	1	0	6
Netherlands (van Dorp)	0	2	0	1	0	1	0	2	0	0	1	7

Sheet B	1	2	3	4	5	6	7	8	9	10	Final
Belgium (Verryecken)	2	0	1	0	2	0	0	0	0	X	5
Poland (Jasiecki)	0	3	0	1	0	2	1	1	3	X	11

Sheet C	1	2	3	4	5	6	7	8	9	10	Final
Wales (Pougher)	3	0	0	1	0	1	0	0	1	X	6
Austria (Wunderer)	0	2	1	0	1	0	4	2	0	X	10

Sheet D	1	2	3	4	5	6	7	8	9	10	Final
Romania (Coliban)	0	0	0	2	0	1	1	0	X	X	4
Hungary (Hall)	2	3	3	0	1	0	0	1	X	X	10

Sheet E	1	2	3	4	5	6	7	8	9	10	Final
Croatia (Čadež)	2	0	1	0	0	1	1	0	1	0	6
Estonia (Lill)	0	2	0	1	2	0	0	1	0	3	9

Sheet F	1	2	3	4	5	6	7	8	9	10	Final
Spain (de Moxo)	0	0	0	0	2	0	X	X	X	X	2
Finland (Kauste)	2	1	4	2	0	0	X	X	X	X	9

=== Tiebreaker ===
Thursday, November 27, 8:30

Sheet A	1	2	3	4	5	6	7	8	9	10	Final
Austria (Wunderer)	0	1	0	0	1	0	1	0	1	X	4
Hungary (Hall)	2	0	0	3	0	2	0	1	0	X	8

=== Playoffs ===
Page playoff system
A1	England	2
B1	Finland	8
A2	Netherlands	9
B2	Hungary	7

Semifinal
A1	England	4
A2	Netherlands	10

Final
B1	Finland	7
A2	Netherlands	6

Bronze-medal game
A1	England	8
B2	Hungary	5

==== 1 vs. 2 ====
Thursday, November 27, 14:00

Sheet B	1	2	3	4	5	6	7	8	9	10	Final
England (MacDougall)	0	0	1	0	1	0	0	0	X	X	2
Finland (Kauste)	2	0	0	1	0	1	1	2	1	X	8

==== 3 vs. 4 ====
Thursday, November 27, 14:00

Sheet E	1	2	3	4	5	6	7	8	9	10	Final
Netherlands (van Dorp)	0	2	0	2	2	0	1	0	2	X	9
Hungary (Hall)	4	0	2	0	0	0	0	1	0	X	7

==== Semifinal ====
Thursday, November 27, 20:00

Team	1	2	3	4	5	6	7	8	9	10	Final
England (MacDougall)	0	1	0	1	0	0	2	0	X	X	4
Netherlands (van Dorp)	0	0	3	0	6	0	0	1	X	X	10

==== Bronze-medal game ====
Friday, November 28, 10:00

Team	1	2	3	4	5	6	7	8	9	10	Final
England (MacDougall)	0	3	1	0	1	0	2	0	1	X	8
Hungary (Hall)	1	0	0	1	0	1	0	2	0	X	5

==== Gold-medal game ====
Friday, November 28, 10:00

Team	1	2	3	4	5	6	7	8	9	10	11	Final
Finland (Kauste)	0	1	2	0	0	1	0	1	1	0	1	7
Netherlands (van Dorp)	1	0	0	1	1	0	1	0	0	2	0	6

== Group C ==
=== Teams ===
Teams are to be announced.

Belarus	Belgium	Bulgaria	Iceland	Ireland
Skip: Dmitry Kirillov; Third: Pavel Petrov; Second: Ilya Kazlouski; Lead: Andrey Aulasenka; Alternate: Oleksii Voloshenko	Skip: Walter Verbueken; Third: Timothy Verreycken; Second: Dirk Heylen; Lead: Gregory Janbroers; Alternate: Tom van Waterschoot	Skip: Stoil Georgiev; Third: Petar Chakarov; Second: Tihomir Todorov; Lead: Ilian Kirilov; Alternate: Stanimar Petrov	Skip: Jón Ingi Sigurðsson; Third: Ólafur Númason; Second: Andri Magnússon; Lead: Guðmundur Karl Ólafsson; Alternate: Sigurður Steindórsson	Fourth: James Russell; Third: Craig Whyte; Skip: Alan Mitchell; Lead: Arran Cameron; Alternate: John Furey
Israel	Luxembourg	Serbia	Slovakia	Slovenia
Skip: Adam Freilich; Third: Yuval Grinspun; Second: Gabriel Kempenich; Lead: Jeffrey Yaakov Lutz; Alternate: Gilad Kempenich	Fourth: Yannick Hansen; Skip: Alex Benoy; Second: Philippe Husi; Lead: Marc Hansen	Fourth: Đorđe Nešković; Skip: Bojan Mijatović; Second: Goran Ungurović; Lead: Filip Stojanović	Skip: Pavol Pitoňák; Third: František Pitoňák; Second: Tomáš Pitoňák; Lead: Peter Pitoňák; Alternate: Juraj Gallo	Fourth: Tomas Tišler; Skip: Gašper Uršič; Second: Jure Čulič; Lead: Jošt Lajovec; Alternate: Gregor Verbinc

=== Round-robin standings ===
Final round-robin standings

Key
Teams to Playoffs

Country	Skip	W	L
Ireland	Alan Mitchell	7	2
Belgium	Walter Verbueken	7	2
Slovakia	Pavol Pitoňák	6	3
Israel	Adam Freilich	6	3
Belarus	Dmitry Kirillov	5	4
Slovenia	Gašper Uršič	5	4
Iceland	Jón Ingi Sigurðsson	3	6
Serbia	Bojan Mijatović	3	6
Luxembourg	Alex Benoy	2	7
Bulgaria	Stoil Georgiey	1	8

=== Round-robin results ===
All draw times are listed in Central European Time (UTC+1).

==== Draw 1 ====
Sunday, October 5, 8:00

Sheet A	1	2	3	4	5	6	7	8	9	10	Final
Bulgaria (Georgiev)	0	1	0	0	1	0	1	0	0	X	3
Slovakia (Pitoňák)	1	0	2	1	0	2	0	4	1	X	11

Sheet B	1	2	3	4	5	6	7	8	9	10	Final
Iceland (Sigurðsson)	0	0	0	2	0	1	4	0	0	X	7
Slovenia (Uršič)	1	1	2	0	2	0	0	3	3	X	12

Sheet C	1	2	3	4	5	6	7	8	9	10	11	Final
Luxembourg (Benoy)	0	0	0	3	0	1	1	1	3	0	3	12
Serbia (Mijatović)	1	1	2	0	1	0	0	0	0	4	0	9

==== Draw 2 ====
Sunday, October 5, 12:00

Sheet A	1	2	3	4	5	6	7	8	9	10	Final
Israel (Freilich)	0	1	0	1	0	2	0	0	0	X	4
Belgium (Verbueken)	1	0	1	0	1	0	1	2	2	X	8

Sheet B	1	2	3	4	5	6	7	8	9	10	Final
Ireland (Mitchell)	2	0	0	3	4	0	0	3	0	X	12
Belarus (Kirillov)	0	0	3	0	0	1	3	0	1	X	8

==== Draw 3 ====
Sunday, October 5, 16:00

Sheet C	1	2	3	4	5	6	7	8	9	10	Final
Slovenia (Uršič)	3	0	3	1	1	0	2	0	2	X	12
Bulgaria (Georgiev)	0	2	0	0	0	1	0	1	0	X	4

==== Draw 4 ====
Sunday, October 5, 20:00

Sheet A	1	2	3	4	5	6	7	8	9	10	Final
Ireland (Mitchell)	2	0	2	0	4	0	0	1	0	X	9
Serbia (Mijatović)	0	2	0	2	0	1	1	0	1	X	7

Sheet B	1	2	3	4	5	6	7	8	9	10	Final
Belgium (Verbueken)	2	0	0	1	2	0	1	0	0	0	6
Slovakia (Pitoňák)	0	1	0	0	0	0	0	1	1	2	5

Sheet C	1	2	3	4	5	6	7	8	9	10	Final
Belarus (Kirillov)	1	0	0	1	1	1	0	0	1	0	5
Israel (Freilich)	0	1	1	0	0	0	1	1	0	2	6

==== Draw 5 ====
Monday, October 6, 8:00

Sheet A	1	2	3	4	5	6	7	8	9	10	Final
Belgium (Verbueken)	2	1	2	0	3	0	3	0	2	X	13
Bulgaria (Georgiev)	0	0	0	1	0	0	0	1	0	X	2

Sheet B	1	2	3	4	5	6	7	8	9	10	Final
Serbia (Mijatović)	0	0	0	0	0	4	0	1	0	2	7
Iceland (Sigurðsson)	2	1	1	1	2	0	1	0	0	0	8

Sheet C	1	2	3	4	5	6	7	8	9	10	Final
Belarus (Kirillov)	1	0	1	0	2	2	0	2	0	X	8
Luxembourg (Benoy)	0	1	0	3	0	0	1	0	1	X	6

==== Draw 6 ====
Monday, October 6, 12:00

Sheet B	1	2	3	4	5	6	7	8	9	10	Final
Slovenia (Uršič)	0	2	0	2	0	2	0	1	0	0	7
Slovakia (Pitoňák)	1	0	1	0	1	0	3	0	2	0	8

==== Draw 7 ====
Monday, October 6, 16:00

Sheet A	1	2	3	4	5	6	7	8	9	10	Final
Luxembourg (Benoy)	1	0	0	0	0	0	0	0	2	X	3
Iceland (Sigurðsson)	0	2	1	2	1	1	1	3	0	X	11

Sheet C	1	2	3	4	5	6	7	8	9	10	Final
Israel (Freilich)	0	0	1	0	0	2	0	1	0	0	4
Ireland (Mitchell)	0	0	0	1	1	0	1	0	2	1	6

==== Draw 8 ====
Monday, October 6, 20:00

Sheet C	1	2	3	4	5	6	7	8	9	10	Final
Serbia (Mijatović)	0	0	0	0	1	0	1	X	X	X	2
Slovenia (Uršič)	3	2	2	2	0	3	0	X	X	X	12

==== Draw 9 ====
Tuesday, October 7, 8:00

Sheet A	1	2	3	4	5	6	7	8	9	10	Final
Slovakia (Pitoňák)	2	0	0	2	0	2	1	0	1	X	8
Belarus (Kirillov)	0	2	1	0	1	0	0	0	0	X	4

Sheet B	1	2	3	4	5	6	7	8	9	10	Final
Luxembourg (Benoy)	1	0	1	1	1	1	1	0	0	2	8
Bulgaria (Georgiev)	0	3	0	0	0	0	0	1	2	0	6

Sheet C	1	2	3	4	5	6	7	8	9	10	Final
Ireland (Mitchell)	0	0	1	0	0	2	0	0	X	X	3
Slovenia (Uršič)	1	0	0	3	0	0	0	4	X	X	8

==== Draw 10 ====
Tuesday, October 7, 12:00

Sheet A	1	2	3	4	5	6	7	8	9	10	Final
Serbia (Mijatović)	1	0	2	0	0	1	0	1	0	2	7
Israel (Freilich)	0	1	0	1	1	0	1	0	1	0	5

Sheet C	1	2	3	4	5	6	7	8	9	10	Final
Belgium (Verbueken)	0	2	0	1	1	0	0	0	1	X	5
Iceland (Sigurðsson)	1	0	2	0	0	1	1	2	0	X	7

==== Draw 11 ====
Tuesday, October 7, 16:00

Sheet B	1	2	3	4	5	6	7	8	9	10	Final
Luxembourg (Benoy)	0	0	0	0	0	1	1	0	X	X	2
Slovenia (Uršič)	1	1	2	1	2	0	0	1	X	X	8

==== Draw 12 ====
Tuesday, October 7, 20:00

Sheet A	1	2	3	4	5	6	7	8	9	10	Final
Iceland (Sigurðsson)	0	2	0	1	0	0	1	0	0	X	4
Ireland (Mitchell)	2	0	1	0	3	2	0	1	0	X	9

Sheet B	1	2	3	4	5	6	7	8	9	10	11	Final
Belarus (Kirillov)	0	1	0	0	1	0	1	2	0	3	0	8
Belgium (Verbueken)	1	0	1	1	0	1	0	0	4	0	1	9

Sheet C	1	2	3	4	5	6	7	8	9	10	Final
Slovakia (Pitoňák)	0	1	0	1	0	1	0	3	0	X	6
Israel (Freilich)	0	0	2	0	2	0	2	0	3	X	9

==== Draw 13 ====
Wednesday, October 8, 8:00

Sheet B	1	2	3	4	5	6	7	8	9	10	Final
Bulgaria (Georgiev)	1	0	1	0	0	4	0	0	1	0	7
Serbia (Mijatović)	0	3	0	2	1	0	2	1	0	2	11

==== Draw 14 ====
Wednesday, October 8, 12:00

Sheet A	1	2	3	4	5	6	7	8	9	10	Final
Slovenia (Uršič)	0	0	1	0	1	0	2	2	0	1	7
Israel (Freilich)	0	2	0	3	0	2	0	0	1	0	8

Sheet C	1	2	3	4	5	6	7	8	9	10	Final
Ireland (Mitchell)	2	0	0	0	1	0	1	1	1	X	6
Belgium (Verbueken)	0	1	1	1	0	1	0	0	0	X	4

==== Draw 15 ====
Wednesday, October 8, 16:00

Sheet A	1	2	3	4	5	6	7	8	9	10	Final
Belarus (Kirillov)	2	0	2	1	1	0	0	0	2	1	9
Serbia (Mijatović)	0	2	0	0	0	1	1	3	0	0	7

Sheet B	1	2	3	4	5	6	7	8	9	10	11	Final
Slovakia (Pitoňák)	2	0	0	1	0	2	2	1	0	0	1	9
Luxembourg (Benoy)	0	1	2	0	3	0	0	0	1	1	0	8

Sheet C	1	2	3	4	5	6	7	8	9	10	Final
Bulgaria (Georgiev)	3	1	0	0	0	1	3	0	0	1	9
Iceland (Sigurðsson)	0	0	1	2	2	0	0	3	0	0	8

==== Draw 17 ====
Thursday, October 9, 8:00

Sheet A	1	2	3	4	5	6	7	8	9	10	Final
Ireland (Mitchell)	2	3	1	3	0	0	2	X	X	X	11
Luxembourg (Benoy)	0	0	0	0	1	2	0	X	X	X	3

Sheet B	1	2	3	4	5	6	7	8	9	10	Final
Israel (Freilich)	0	3	0	0	2	1	2	0	X	X	8
Bulgaria (Georgiev)	0	0	0	1	0	0	0	1	X	X	2

Sheet C	1	2	3	4	5	6	7	8	9	10	Final
Iceland (Sigurðsson)	4	0	1	0	1	0	1	0	X	X	7
Slovakia (Pitoňák)	0	2	0	3	0	4	0	4	X	X	13

==== Draw 18 ====
Thursday, October 9, 12:00

Sheet A	1	2	3	4	5	6	7	8	9	10	Final
Belarus (Kirillov)	1	0	1	1	2	0	1	0	1	X	7
Slovenia (Uršič)	0	1	0	0	0	1	0	2	0	X	4

Sheet C	1	2	3	4	5	6	7	8	9	10	Final
Serbia (Mijatović)	1	1	0	0	2	0	0	1	0	X	5
Belgium (Verbueken)	0	0	1	1	0	1	3	0	3	X	9

==== Draw 19 ====
Thursday, October 9, 16:00

Sheet B	1	2	3	4	5	6	7	8	9	10	11	Final
Slovakia (Pitoňák)	0	2	0	3	0	0	1	0	2	1	1	10
Ireland (Mitchell)	2	0	2	0	3	0	0	2	0	0	0	9

==== Draw 20 ====
Thursday, October 9, 20:00

Sheet A	1	2	3	4	5	6	7	8	9	10	Final
Belgium (Verbueken)	2	3	0	4	3	1	X	X	X	X	13
Luxembourg (Benoy)	0	0	1	0	0	0	X	X	X	X	1

Sheet B	1	2	3	4	5	6	7	8	9	10	Final
Iceland (Sigurðsson)	2	0	2	0	2	0	0	1	0	X	7
Israel (Freilich)	0	1	0	4	0	3	1	0	1	X	10

Sheet C	1	2	3	4	5	6	7	8	9	10	Final
Bulgaria (Georgiev)	0	0	2	0	0	1	2	0	X	X	5
Belarus (Kirillov)	3	3	0	2	3	0	0	2	X	X	13

==== Draw 21 ====
Friday, October 10, 8:00

Sheet A	1	2	3	4	5	6	7	8	9	10	Final
Slovakia (Pitoňák)	0	0	1	0	1	0	0	1	1	X	4
Serbia (Mijatović)	2	1	0	1	0	2	0	0	0	X	6

Sheet B	1	2	3	4	5	6	7	8	9	10	Final
Slovenia (Uršič)	1	0	0	0	0	0	0	2	1	X	4
Belgium (Verbueken)	0	2	0	1	1	2	1	0	0	X	7

==== Draw 22 ====
Friday, October 10, 12:00

Sheet A	1	2	3	4	5	6	7	8	9	10	Final
Iceland (Sigurðsson)	1	0	2	0	0	1	0	1	0	X	5
Belarus (Kirillov)	0	1	0	2	2	0	1	0	1	X	7

Sheet B	1	2	3	4	5	6	7	8	9	10	Final
Bulgaria (Georgiev)	0	1	0	1	0	1	0	1	X	X	4
Ireland (Mitchell)	2	0	3	0	0	0	5	0	X	X	10

Sheet C	1	2	3	4	5	6	7	8	9	10	Final
Israel (Freilich)	4	1	0	1	3	0	X	X	X	X	9
Luxembourg (Benoy)	0	0	2	0	0	2	X	X	X	X	4

=== Playoffs ===
Second Place Game
1	Ireland	3
4	Israel	7

Semifinals
1	Ireland	5
2	Belgium	7
3	Slovakia	6
4	Israel	7

==== 1 vs. 2 ====
Friday, October 10, 20:00

Team	1	2	3	4	5	6	7	8	9	10	Final
Ireland (Mitchell)	0	0	3	0	0	0	1	0	1	0	5
Belgium (Verbueken)	0	0	0	2	3	1	0	0	0	1	7

Belgium advances to Group B competitions.
Ireland advances to Second Place Game.

==== 3 vs. 4 ====
Saturday, October 11, 9:00

Team	1	2	3	4	5	6	7	8	9	10	Final
Slovakia (Pitoňák)	0	0	1	0	2	0	2	0	1	0	6
Israel (Freilich)	0	1	0	2	0	1	0	1	0	2	7

Israel advances to Second Place Game.

==== Second Place Game ====
Saturday, October 11, 13:30

Team	1	2	3	4	5	6	7	8	9	10	Final
Ireland (Mitchell)	0	0	0	0	0	0	2	0	1	0	3
Israel (Freilich)	1	1	0	0	1	1	0	1	0	2	7

Israel advances to Group B competitions.
