= Philippe Caux =

French curler (born 1973)

- Curler ♂
- Born: 25 October 1973 (age 53); Chamonix, Haute-Savoie, France

Team
- Curling club: Megève CC, Megève, Chamonix CC, Chamonix

Curling career
- Member Association: France
- World Championship: 2 (2001, 2004)
- European Championship: 4 (2000, 2002, 2003, 2005)
- Olympic: 1 (2002)
- Other appearances: World Junior Championships: 5 (1991, 1992, 1993, 1994, 1995)
Medal record
Curling
World Junior Championships
Silver medal – second place	1992 Oberstdorf
Bronze medal – third place	1993 Grindelwald

Philippe Caux (born 25 October 1973 in Chamonix, Haute-Savoie, France) is a French curler.

He participated at the 2002 Winter Olympics where the French men's team finished in tenth place.

== Teams ==
Season	Skip	Third	Second	Lead	Alternate	Coach	Events
1990–91	Jan Henri Ducroz	Spencer Mugnier	Sylvain Ducroz	Thomas Dufour	Philippe Caux		WJCC 1991 (9th)
1991–92	Jan Henri Ducroz	Spencer Mugnier	Sylvain Ducroz	Thomas Dufour	Philippe Caux		WJCC 1992 (silver)
1992–93	Spencer Mugnier	Thomas Dufour	Sylvain Ducroz	Philippe Caux	Cyrille Prunet		WJCC 1993 (bronze)
1993–94	Spencer Mugnier	Thomas Dufour	Sylvain Ducroz	Philippe Caux	Cyrille Prunet		WJCC 1994 (7th)
1994–95	Cyrille Prunet	Eric Laffin	Vincent Lefebvre	Mathias Guenoun	Philippe Caux		WJCC 1995 (10th)
2000–01	Dominique Dupont-Roc	Jan Henri Ducroz	Thomas Dufour	Spencer Mugnier	Philippe Caux	Bruno-Denis Dubois	ECC 2000 (7th); WCC 2001 (6th)
2001–02	Dominique Dupont-Roc	Jan Ducroz	Thomas Dufour	Spencer Mugnier	Philippe Caux		WOG 2002 (7th)
2002–03	Dominique Dupont-Roc	Jan Henri Ducroz	Spencer Mugnier	Philippe Caux	Julien Charlet		ECC 2002 (9th)
2003–04	Thomas Dufour	Philippe Caux	Lionel Roux	Tony Angiboust	Julien Charlet	Hervé Poirot (ECC, WCC); Bruno-Denis Dubois (ECC)	ECC 2003 (7th); WCC 2004 (10th)
2005–06	Thomas Dufour	Philippe Caux	Tony Angiboust	Richard Ducroz	Jan Henri Ducroz	Hervé Poirot	ECC 2005 (11th)
