= 2014 European Curling Championships =

- Host city: Champéry, Switzerland
- Arena: Palladium de Champéry
- Dates: November 22–29
- Men's winner: Sweden
- Curling club: Karlstads CK, Karlstad
- Skip: Niklas Edin
- Third: Oskar Eriksson
- Second: Kristian Lindström
- Lead: Christoffer Sundgren
- Alternate: Henrik Leek
- Coach: Peja Lindholm
- Finalist: Norway (Thomas Ulsrud)
- Women's winner: Switzerland
- Curling club: Flims CC, Flims
- Skip: Binia Feltscher
- Third: Irene Schori
- Second: Franziska Kaufmann
- Lead: Christine Urech
- Alternate: Carole Howald
- Coach: Al Moore
- Finalist: Russia (Anna Sidorova)

The 2014 European Curling Championships were held November 22 to 29 at the Palladium de Champéry in Champéry, Switzerland. Switzerland last hosted the European Curling Championships in 2010, when it was also held in Champéry. The Group C competitions was held in October at the PWA Silverdome in Zoetermeer, the Netherlands.

At the conclusion of the championships, the top eight women's teams will go to the 2015 World Women's Curling Championship in Sapporo, and the top eight men's teams will go to the 2015 Ford World Men's Curling Championship in Halifax.

This edition of the European Curling Championships marks the first appearance of Israel at an international curling event. The Israeli men's curling team will compete in the Group C tournament in Zoetermeer.

== Men ==
=== Group A ===
The Group A competitions will be contested in Champéry.

==== Round-robin standings ====
Final round-robin standings

Key
Teams to Playoffs
Teams to Tiebreaker
Teams relegated to 2015 Group B

Country	Skip	W	L
Sweden	Niklas Edin	9	0
Italy	Joël Retornaz	7	2
Switzerland	Sven Michel	6	3
Norway	Thomas Ulsrud	5	4
Czech Republic	Jiří Snítil	5	4
Russia	Evgeniy Arkhipov	5	4
Scotland	David Edwards	3	6
Germany	Alexander Baumann	3	6
Denmark	Rasmus Stjerne	1	8
Latvia	Ritvars Gulbis	1	8

Russia were eliminated from the tiebreaker by virtue of their head-to-head record against the other teams.

==== Playoffs ====
Page playoff system
1	Sweden	6
2	Italy	2
3	Switzerland	2
4	Norway	5

Semifinal
2	Italy	6
4	Norway	7

Final
1	Sweden	5
4	Norway	4

Bronze Medal Game
2	Italy	6
3	Switzerland	8

Bronze Medal Game

Friday, November 28, 19:30

Team	1	2	3	4	5	6	7	8	9	10	Final
Italy (Retornaz) 🔨	0	1	0	1	1	0	2	0	1	0	6
Switzerland (Michel)	1	0	2	0	0	2	0	2	0	1	8

Player percentages
Italy		Switzerland	
Andrea Pilzer	86%	Stefan Meienberg	84%
Sebastiano Arman	85%	Simon Gempeler	71%
Joël Retornaz	73%	Florian Meister	71%
Amos Mosaner	75%	Sven Michel	83%
Total	80%	Total	77%

Gold Medal Game

Saturday, November 29, 15:00

Sheet C	1	2	3	4	5	6	7	8	9	10	11	Final
Sweden (Edin) 🔨	0	0	0	2	0	0	1	0	1	0	1	5
Norway (Ulsrud)	0	0	0	0	0	1	0	2	0	1	0	4

Player percentages
Sweden		Norway	
Christoffer Sundgren	91%	Håvard Vad Petersson	98%
Kristian Lindström	86%	Christoffer Svae	72%
Oskar Eriksson	76%	Torger Nergård	85%
Niklas Edin	86%	Thomas Ulsrud	90%
Total	85%	Total	86%

=== Group B ===
The Group B competitions will be contested in Monthey.

==== Round-robin standings ====
Final round-robin standings

Key
Teams to Playoffs
Teams to Tiebreaker
Teams relegated to 2015 Group C

Group A	Skip	W	L
England	Alan MacDougall	6	1
Netherlands	Jaap van Dorp	6	1
Croatia	Alen Čadež	4	3
Turkey	Alican Karataş	4	3
Estonia	Martin Lill	4	3
Israel	Adam Freilich	3	4
Lithuania	Mantas Kulakauskas	1	6
France	Lionel Roux	0	7

Group B	Skip	W	L
Finland	Aku Kauste	6	1
Hungary	Krisztian Hall	5	2
Austria	Sebastian Wunderer	5	2
Belgium	Timothy Verreycken	4	3
Wales	James Pougher	4	3
Poland	Borys Jasiecki	3	4
Spain	Carles de Moxo	1	6
Romania	Allen Coliban	0	7

Team France did not attend the Group B tournament, and were given automatic forfeits for each of their games.

==== Playoffs ====
Page playoff system
A1	England	2
B1	Finland	8
A2	Netherlands	9
B2	Hungary	7

Semifinal
A1	England	4
A2	Netherlands	10

Final
B1	Finland	7
A2	Netherlands	6

Bronze Medal Game
A1	England	8
B2	Hungary	5

Bronze Medal Game

Friday, November 28, 10:00

Team	1	2	3	4	5	6	7	8	9	10	Final
England (MacDougall) 🔨	0	3	1	0	1	0	2	0	1	X	8
Hungary (Hall)	1	0	0	1	0	1	0	2	0	X	5

Gold Medal Game

Friday, November 28, 10:00

Team	1	2	3	4	5	6	7	8	9	10	11	Final
Finland (Kauste)	0	1	2	0	0	1	0	1	1	0	1	7
Netherlands (van Dorp) 🔨	1	0	0	1	1	0	1	0	0	2	0	6

=== Group C ===
The Group C competitions will be contested in Zoetermeer.

==== Round-robin standings ====
Final round-robin standings

Key
Teams to Playoffs

Country	Skip	W	L
Ireland	Alan Mitchell	7	2
Belgium	Walter Verbueken	7	2
Slovakia	Pavol Pitoňák	6	3
Israel	Adam Freilich	6	3
Belarus	Dmitry Kirillov	5	4
Slovenia	Gašper Uršič	5	4
Iceland	Jón Ingi Sigurðsson	3	6
Serbia	Bojan Mijatović	3	6
Bulgaria	Stoil Georgiey	2	7
Luxembourg	Alex Benoy	2	7

==== Playoffs ====
Second Place Game
1	Ireland	3
4	Israel	7

Semifinals
1	Ireland	5
2	Belgium	7
3	Slovakia	6
4	Israel	7

== Women ==
=== Group A ===
The Group A competitions will be contested in Champéry.

=== Round-robin standings ===
Final round-robin standings

Key
Teams to Playoffs
Countries relegated to 2015 Group B

Country	Skip	W	L
Russia	Anna Sidorova	9	0
Switzerland	Binia Feltscher	6	3
Scotland	Eve Muirhead	6	3
Denmark	Lene Nielsen	6	3
Sweden	Anna Hasselborg	5	4
Finland	Sanna Puustinen	5	4
Germany	Andrea Schöpp	4	5
Estonia	Maile Mölder	2	7
Latvia	Iveta Staša-Šaršūne	1	8
Czech Republic	Linda Klímová	1	8

==== Playoffs ====
Page playoff system
1	Russia	5
2	Switzerland	6
3	Scotland	3
4	Denmark	8

Semifinal
1	Russia	9
4	Denmark	4

Final
2	Switzerland	8
1	Russia	7

Bronze Medal Game
3	Scotland	8
4	Denmark	4

Bronze Medal Game

Friday, November 28, 19:30

Team	1	2	3	4	5	6	7	8	9	10	Final
Scotland (Muirhead)	0	2	0	2	0	2	2	0	X	X	8
Denmark (Nielsen) 🔨	1	0	1	0	1	0	0	1	X	X	4

Player percentages
Scotland		Denmark	
Sarah Reid	97%	Charlotte Clemmensen	81%
Vicki Adams	86%	Jeanne Ellegaard	78%
Anna Sloan	86%	Stephanie Risdal	56%
Eve Muirhead	89%	Lene Nielsen	69%
Total	89%	Total	71%

Gold Medal Game

Saturday, November 29, 10:00

Sheet C	1	2	3	4	5	6	7	8	9	10	Final
Switzerland (Feltscher) 🔨	0	1	0	1	0	2	0	4	0	0	8
Russia (Sidorova)	0	0	1	0	2	0	1	0	2	1	7

Player percentages
Switzerland		Russia	
Christine Urech	92%	Ekaterina Galkina	88%
Franziska Kaufmann	86%	Alexandra Saitova	81%
Irene Schori	79%	Margarita Fomina	86%
Binia Feltscher	75%	Anna Sidorova	80%
Total	83%	Total	84%

=== Group B ===
The Group B competitions will be contested in Champéry.

==== Round-robin standings ====
Final round-robin standings

Key
Teams to Playoffs
Teams to Tiebreaker
Countries relegated to 2015 Group C

Country	Skip	W	L
Norway	Kristin Skaslien	8	1
Austria	Karina Toth	7	2
Italy	Veronica Zappone	6	3
Hungary	Dorottya Palancsa	5	4
Turkey	Öznur Polat	5	4
England	Anna Fowler	5	4
Netherlands	Marianne Neeleman	4	5
Poland	Marta Pluta	4	5
Belarus	Alina Pavlyuchik	1	8
Slovakia	Marína Gallová	0	9

==== Playoffs ====
Page playoff system
1	Norway	10
2	Austria	5
3	Italy	3
4	Hungary	11

Semifinal
2	Austria	6
4	Hungary	7

Final
1	Norway	10
4	Hungary	6

Bronze Medal Game
2	Austria	2
3	Italy	10

Bronze Medal Game

Friday, November 28, 10:00

Sheet K	1	2	3	4	5	6	7	8	9	10	Final
Austria (Toth)	0	0	0	0	0	1	0	1	X	X	2
Italy (Zappone)	1	1	2	1	2	0	3	0	X	X	10

Gold Medal Game

Friday, November 28, 10:00

Team	1	2	3	4	5	6	7	8	9	10	Final
Norway (Skaslien) 🔨	2	0	2	0	0	3	0	0	2	1	10
Hungary (Palancsa)	0	1	0	1	3	0	1	0	0	0	6

=== Group C ===
The Group C competitions will be contested in Zoetermeer.

==== Round-robin standings ====
Final round-robin standings

Key
Teams to Playoffs

Country	Skip	W	L
Slovakia	Marina Gallova	6	0
Netherlands	Marianne Neeleman	4	2
Spain	Oihane Otaegi	4	2
Slovenia	Valentina Jurinčič	3	3
Croatia	Melani Turkovic	2	4
Ireland	Margarita Sweeney-Baird	1	5
Romania	Daiana Colceriu	1	5

==== Playoffs ====
Second Place Game
1	Slovakia	4
3	Spain	3

Semifinals
1	Slovakia	5
2	Netherlands	6
3	Spain	8
4	Slovenia	4
