= 2010 Baden Masters =

- Host city: Baden, Switzerland
- Arena: Curling Center Baden Regio
- Dates: Sept. 10-12
- Winner: Team Lips
- Curling club: CC Baden Regio, Baden, Switzerland
- Skip: Thomas Lips
- Third: Toni Müller (fourth)
- Second: Remo Schmid
- Lead: Simon Strübin
- Finalist: Brad Gushue

The 2010 Baden Masters was held September 10-12 in Baden, Switzerland. It was the first event of the Men's World Curling Tour for the 2010-11 curling season. The total purse of the event was 26,500 Swiss francs (CHF). The winning team was the hometown Thomas Lips rink which defeated the new Brad Gushue/Randy Ferbey combination team in the final. Lips' team would win 10,000 CHF. In the bronze medal game, Norway's Thomas Ulsrud defeated Sweden's Niklas Edin.

== Participating teams ==
- (Switzerland) Alexander Attinger
- (Scotland) Tom Brewster
- (Russia) Andrey Drozdov
- (Sweden) Niklas Edin
- (Canada) Brad Gushue
- (Switzerland) Pascal Hess
- (Russia) Aleksandr Kirikov
- (Switzerland) Thomas Lips
- (Norway) Thomas Løvold
- (Switzerland) Dominik Märki
- (Scotland) David Murdoch
- (Netherlands) Mark Neeleman
- (Germany) Daniel Neuner
- (Switzerland) Claudio Pescia
- (Switzerland) Manuel Ruch
- (Switzerland) Christof Schwaller
- (Czech Republic) Jiří Snítil
- (Norway) Thomas Ulsrud
- (Finland) Markku Uusipaavalniemi
- (Switzerland) Patrick Vuille

== Draw ==
Group A	W	L
(Canada) Gushue	4	0
(Switzerland) Märki	3	1
(Switzerland) Hess	1	3
(Norway) Løvold	1	3
(Netherlands) Neeleman	1	3

Group B	W	L
(Switzerland) Lips	3	1
(Scotland) Murdoch	3	1
(Switzerland) Pescia	3	1
(Czech Republic) Snítil	1	3
(Russia) Kirikov	0	4

Group C	W	L
(Norway) Ulsrud	4	0
(Finland) Uusipaavalniemi	2	2
(Switzerland) Schwaller	2	2
(Russia) Drozdov	1	3
(Switzerland) Ruch	1	3

Group D	W	L
(Sweden) Edin	4	0
(Scotland) Brewster	3	1
(Switzerland) Attinger	1	3
(Germany) Neuner	1	3
(Switzerland) Vuille	1	3

== Playoffs ==
Quarterfinals
(Canada) Gushue	7
(Scotland) Murdoch	2
(Norway) Ulsrud	5
(Scotland) Brewster	2
(Switzerland) Lips	7
(Switzerland) Märki	3
(Sweden) Edin	4
(Finland) Uusipaavalniemi	2

Semifinals
(Canada) Gushue	6
(Norway) Ulsrud	2
(Switzerland) Lips	8
(Sweden) Edin	5

Finals
(Canada) Gushue	4
(Switzerland) Lips	6
Third place
(Norway) Ulsrud	7
(Sweden) Edin	3
