= 2004 World Men's Curling Championship =

- Host city: Gävle, Sweden
- Arena: Gavlerinken
- Dates: April 17–25, 2004
- Winner: Sweden
- Curling club: Östersunds CK, Östersund
- Skip: Peja Lindholm
- Third: Tomas Nordin
- Second: Magnus Swartling
- Lead: Peter Narup
- Alternate: Anders Kraupp
- Coach: Lars-Åke Nordström
- Finalist: Germany (Sebastian Stock)

The 2004 World Men's Curling Championship (branded as 2004 Ford World Men's Curling Championship for sponsorship reasons) was held at the Gavlerinken in Gävle, Sweden from April 17–25, 2004.

The tournament was held in conjunction with the 2004 World Women's Curling Championship and the 2004 World Senior Curling Championships.

== Teams ==
Canada	Denmark	France	Germany	New Zealand
Mayflower CC, Halifax, Nova Scotia Skip: Mark Dacey; Third: Bruce Lohnes; Second: Robert Harris; Lead: Andrew Gibson; Alternate: Mathew Harris	Hvidovre CC, Hvidovre Skip: Johnny Frederiksen; Third: Lars Vilandt; Second: Kenneth Daucke Andersen; Lead: Bo Jensen; Alternate: Henrik Jakobsen	Chamonix CC, Chamonix Skip: Thomas Dufour; Third: Philippe Caux; Second: Lionel Roux; Lead: Tony Angiboust; Alternate: Julien Charlet	EC Oberstdorf, Oberstdorf Skip: Sebastian Stock; Third: Daniel Herberg; Second: Stephan Knoll; Lead: Markus Messenzehl; Alternate: Patrick Hoffman	Ranfurly CC, Ranfurly Skip: Sean Becker; Third: Hans Frauenlob; Second: Dan Mustapic; Lead: Lorne De Pape; Alternate: Warren Dobson
Norway	Scotland	Sweden	Switzerland	United States
Stabekk CC, Oslo Skip: Pål Trulsen; Third: Lars Vågberg; Second: Flemming Davanger; Lead: Bent Ånund Ramsfjell; Alternate: Torger Nergård	Citadel CC, Inverness Skip: Ewan MacDonald; Third: Warwick Smith; Second: David Hay; Lead: Peter Loudon; Alternate: Craig Wilson	Östersunds CK, Östersund Skip: Peja Lindholm; Third: Tomas Nordin; Second: Magnus Swartling; Lead: Peter Narup; Alternate: Anders Kraupp	Basel-Ysfäger CC, Basel Skip: Bernhard Werthemann; Third: Thomas Lips; Second: Daniel Widmer; Lead: Thomas Hoch; Alternate: Stefan Traub	Granite CC, Seattle, Washington Skip: Jason Larway; Third: Doug Pottinger; Second: Joel Larway; Lead: Bill Todhunter; Alternate: Doug Kaufmann

== Round-robin standings ==
Key
Teams to playoffs

Country	Skip	W	L
Canada	Mark Dacey	9	0
Norway	Pål Trulsen	7	2
Sweden	Peja Lindholm	6	3
Germany	Sebastian Stock	6	3
Scotland	Ewan MacDonald	5	4
Switzerland	Bernhard Werthemann	3	6
New Zealand	Sean Becker	3	6
Denmark	Johnny Frederiksen	2	7
United States	Jason Larway	2	7
France	Thomas Dufour	2	7

== Round-robin results ==
=== Draw 1 ===
April 17, 2004 13:30

Sheet A	1	2	3	4	5	6	7	8	9	10	Final
Germany (Stock)	0	0	0	0	1	0	1	0	1	X	3
Sweden (Lindholm)	0	2	0	2	0	0	0	3	0	X	7

Sheet B	1	2	3	4	5	6	7	8	9	10	Final
France (Dufour)	0	0	1	0	1	1	2	0	3	X	8
Switzerland (Werthemann)	0	0	0	1	0	0	0	1	0	X	2

Sheet C	1	2	3	4	5	6	7	8	9	10	Final
New Zealand (Becker)	0	0	0	0	0	0	3	0	3	0	6
Denmark (Frederiksen)	0	0	0	0	0	1	0	2	0	0	3

Sheet D	1	2	3	4	5	6	7	8	9	10	Final
Norway (Trulsen)	2	0	0	1	0	1	0	0	0	1	5
United States (Larway)	0	0	1	0	2	0	0	1	0	0	4

Sheet E	1	2	3	4	5	6	7	8	9	10	Final
Canada (Dacey)	0	1	0	1	1	2	0	3	0	0	8
Scotland (MacDonald)	1	0	1	0	0	0	3	0	1	1	7

=== Draw 2 ===
April 18, 2004 08:00

Sheet A	1	2	3	4	5	6	7	8	9	10	Final
United States (Larway)	0	3	0	0	0	1	0	3	0	0	7
Switzerland (Werthemann)	0	0	3	1	1	0	1	0	1	1	8

Sheet B	1	2	3	4	5	6	7	8	9	10	Final
Scotland (MacDonald)	0	0	0	1	0	1	1	0	0	2	5
New Zealand (Becker)	0	2	0	0	1	0	0	1	0	0	4

Sheet C	1	2	3	4	5	6	7	8	9	10	Final
Germany (Stock)	3	0	3	0	2	0	2	X	X	X	10
France (Dufour)	0	2	0	1	0	1	0	X	X	X	4

Sheet D	1	2	3	4	5	6	7	8	9	10	Final
Denmark (Frederiksen)	1	0	1	0	1	0	0	0	X	X	3
Canada (Dacey)	0	2	0	2	0	3	1	2	X	X	10

Sheet E	1	2	3	4	5	6	7	8	9	10	Final
Sweden (Lindholm)	0	0	0	0	1	0	2	0	X	X	3
Norway (Trulsen)	0	3	2	0	0	1	0	2	X	X	8

=== Draw 3 ===
April 18, 2004 16:00

Sheet A	1	2	3	4	5	6	7	8	9	10	Final
New Zealand (Becker)	0	0	1	0	1	0	0	2	0	1	5
Germany (Stock)	0	1	0	0	0	2	0	0	1	0	4

Sheet B	1	2	3	4	5	6	7	8	9	10	Final
Denmark (Frederiksen)	0	0	2	1	0	0	2	0	1	0	6
Norway (Trulsen)	2	2	0	0	1	1	0	0	0	2	8

Sheet C	1	2	3	4	5	6	7	8	9	10	Final
Switzerland (Werthemann)	1	0	0	0	0	1	0	0	X	X	2
Canada (Dacey)	0	0	0	4	1	0	1	1	X	X	7

Sheet D	1	2	3	4	5	6	7	8	9	10	Final
Scotland (MacDonald)	0	0	1	0	0	0	1	0	0	4	6
Sweden (Lindholm)	0	0	0	0	2	0	0	1	0	0	3

Sheet E	1	2	3	4	5	6	7	8	9	10	Final
France (Dufour)	0	1	0	0	1	0	0	X	X	X	2
United States (Larway)	2	0	2	1	0	1	2	X	X	X	8

=== Draw 4 ===
April 19, 2004 08:30

Sheet A	1	2	3	4	5	6	7	8	9	10	Final
Sweden (Lindholm)	4	1	2	2	2	0	X	X	X	X	11
France (Dufour)	0	0	0	0	0	1	X	X	X	X	1

Sheet B	1	2	3	4	5	6	7	8	9	10	Final
Canada (Dacey)	0	2	0	2	0	2	2	X	X	X	8
Germany (Stock)	0	0	1	0	1	0	0	X	X	X	2

Sheet C	1	2	3	4	5	6	7	8	9	10	Final
United States (Larway)	0	1	0	2	0	1	0	0	X	X	4
Scotland (MacDonald)	2	0	2	0	2	0	0	4	X	X	10

Sheet D	1	2	3	4	5	6	7	8	9	10	Final
Switzerland (Werthemann)	0	0	2	1	2	0	3	X	X	X	8
Denmark (Frederiksen)	0	0	0	0	0	1	0	X	X	X	1

Sheet E	1	2	3	4	5	6	7	8	9	10	Final
Norway (Trulsen)	1	0	2	0	0	4	0	0	0	1	8
New Zealand (Becker)	0	2	0	2	0	0	1	0	1	0	6

=== Draw 5 ===
April 19, 2004 19:00

Sheet A	1	2	3	4	5	6	7	8	9	10	Final
Denmark (Frederiksen)	0	0	0	1	0	0	0	0	2	1	4
Scotland (MacDonald)	0	1	3	0	0	0	1	1	0	0	6

Sheet B	1	2	3	4	5	6	7	8	9	10	Final
Norway (Trulsen)	0	0	2	0	2	0	2	0	0	0	6
France (Dufour)	0	0	0	1	0	1	0	0	2	1	5

Sheet C	1	2	3	4	5	6	7	8	9	10	Final
Canada (Dacey)	2	0	0	1	0	0	1	0	1	3	8
New Zealand (Becker)	0	0	2	0	1	0	0	0	0	0	3

Sheet D	1	2	3	4	5	6	7	8	9	10	Final
United States (Larway)	1	0	1	0	0	1	0	0	1	1	5
Germany (Stock)	0	2	0	1	1	0	3	0	0	0	7

Sheet E	1	2	3	4	5	6	7	8	9	10	Final
Switzerland (Werthemann)	0	2	0	0	0	0	1	0	0	0	3
Sweden (Lindholm)	0	0	2	0	0	0	0	1	3	0	6

=== Draw 6 ===
April 20, 2004 14:00

Sheet A	1	2	3	4	5	6	7	8	9	10	Final
Canada (Dacey)	0	2	2	0	1	0	4	X	X	X	9
United States (Larway)	0	0	0	1	0	1	0	X	X	X	2

Sheet B	1	2	3	4	5	6	7	8	9	10	11	Final
Switzerland (Werthemann)	0	0	0	0	0	0	0	0	2	1	0	3
Scotland (MacDonald)	0	0	0	0	0	1	0	2	0	0	1	4

Sheet C	1	2	3	4	5	6	7	8	9	10	Final
Norway (Trulsen)	0	0	1	0	1	0	0	0	1	0	3
Germany (Stock)	1	2	0	1	0	0	0	0	0	0	4

Sheet D	1	2	3	4	5	6	7	8	9	10	Final
Sweden (Lindholm)	0	0	2	0	0	0	1	0	0	1	4
New Zealand (Becker)	1	0	0	2	0	0	0	0	0	0	3

Sheet E	1	2	3	4	5	6	7	8	9	10	Final
Denmark (Frederiksen)	0	2	0	2	0	1	0	1	0	1	7
France (Dufour)	0	0	1	0	1	0	2	0	1	0	5

=== Draw 7 ===
April 21, 2004 08:30

Sheet A	1	2	3	4	5	6	7	8	9	10	Final
Switzerland (Werthemann)	0	0	1	0	1	0	0	1	1	1	5
Norway (Trulsen)	1	2	0	2	0	1	1	0	0	0	7

Sheet B	1	2	3	4	5	6	7	8	9	10	Final
New Zealand (Becker)	0	0	0	2	0	0	0	1	1	0	4
United States (Larway)	2	0	0	0	1	0	1	0	0	2	6

Sheet C	1	2	3	4	5	6	7	8	9	10	Final
Denmark (Frederiksen)	0	0	1	0	0	1	0	1	0	0	3
Sweden (Lindholm)	0	1	0	0	1	0	2	0	1	0	5

Sheet D	1	2	3	4	5	6	7	8	9	10	Final
Canada (Dacey)	1	0	1	1	0	3	1	X	X	X	7
France (Dufour)	0	0	0	0	1	0	0	X	X	X	1

Sheet E	1	2	3	4	5	6	7	8	9	10	11	Final
Scotland (MacDonald)	0	0	2	1	0	1	1	0	1	0	0	6
Germany (Stock)	0	1	0	0	2	0	0	1	0	2	1	7

=== Draw 8 ===
April 21, 2004 19:00

Sheet A	1	2	3	4	5	6	7	8	9	10	Final
France (Dufour)	0	2	0	2	0	1	0	0	0	1	6
New Zealand (Becker)	0	0	2	0	3	0	1	0	2	0	8

Sheet B	1	2	3	4	5	6	7	8	9	10	Final
Sweden (Lindholm)	0	1	0	2	0	0	1	0	2	0	6
Canada (Dacey)	0	0	1	0	1	0	0	3	0	2	7

Sheet C	1	2	3	4	5	6	7	8	9	10	Final
Scotland (MacDonald)	0	2	0	0	0	0	0	0	0	X	2
Norway (Trulsen)	0	0	1	0	1	0	0	1	3	X	6

Sheet D	1	2	3	4	5	6	7	8	9	10	11	Final
Germany (Stock)	1	0	2	0	0	0	0	1	0	2	1	7
Switzerland (Werthemann)	0	1	0	1	1	0	1	0	2	0	0	6

Sheet E	1	2	3	4	5	6	7	8	9	10	Final
United States (Larway)	0	1	0	0	1	1	0	0	0	0	3
Denmark (Frederiksen)	0	0	2	3	0	0	0	1	0	1	7

=== Draw 9 ===
April 22, 2004 13:00

Sheet A	1	2	3	4	5	6	7	8	9	10	Final
Norway (Trulsen)	0	1	0	2	2	0	1	0	2	0	8
Canada (Dacey)	1	0	1	0	0	2	0	3	0	4	11

Sheet B	1	2	3	4	5	6	7	8	9	10	Final
Germany (Stock)	2	1	0	2	0	2	1	1	0	X	9
Denmark (Frederiksen)	0	0	2	0	2	0	0	0	1	X	5

Sheet C	1	2	3	4	5	6	7	8	9	10	Final
Sweden (Lindholm)	0	0	0	0	0	0	1	0	0	1	2
United States (Larway)	0	0	0	0	0	0	0	0	1	0	1

Sheet D	1	2	3	4	5	6	7	8	9	10	Final
France (Dufour)	2	0	1	0	0	0	0	2	0	1	6
Scotland (MacDonald)	0	2	0	1	0	1	0	0	1	0	5

Sheet E	1	2	3	4	5	6	7	8	9	10	Final
New Zealand (Becker)	2	0	0	0	0	0	1	X	X	X	3
Switzerland (Werthemann)	0	2	2	1	2	2	0	X	X	X	9

== Playoffs ==
=== Brackets ===
Semi-final
1	Canada	6
4	Germany	9
2	Norway	6
3	Sweden	8

Final
4	Germany	6
3	Sweden	7
Bronze medal
2	Norway	3
1	Canada	9

=== Semi-final ===
April 25, 2004 13:30

Sheet C	1	2	3	4	5	6	7	8	9	10	Final
Canada (Dacey)	1	0	1	1	0	1	0	0	2	0	6
Germany (Stock)	0	2	0	0	2	0	4	0	0	1	9

Player percentages
Canada		Germany	
Andrew Gibson	74%	Patrick Hoffman	74%
Robert Harris	78%	Markus Messenzehl	78%
Bruce Lohnes	71%	Daniel Herberg	83%
Mark Dacey	64%	Sebastian Stock	81%
Total	72%	Total	79%

Sheet C	1	2	3	4	5	6	7	8	9	10	Final
Norway (Trulsen)	0	1	0	1	0	2	0	2	0	0	6
Sweden (Lindholm)	0	0	1	0	2	0	1	0	2	2	8

Player percentages
Norway		Sweden	
Bent Ånund Ramsfjell	78%	Peter Narup	88%
Flemming Davanger	83%	Magnus Swartling	70%
Lars Vågberg	76%	Tomas Nordin	78%
Pål Trulsen	70%	Peter Lindholm	70%
Total	77%	Total	77%

=== Bronze medal game ===
April 25, 2004 11:00

Sheet B	1	2	3	4	5	6	7	8	9	10	Final
Norway (Trulsen)	0	1	0	1	0	1	0	0	0	X	3
Canada (Dacey)	1	0	2	0	2	0	0	0	4	X	9

Player percentages
Norway		Canada	
Bent Ånund Ramsfjell	79%	Andrew Gibson	76%
Flemming Davanger	88%	Robert Harris	82%
Lars Vågberg	81%	Bruce Lohnes	82%
Pål Trulsen	79%	Mark Dacey	90%
Total	82%	Total	82%

=== Gold medal game ===
April 25, 2004 15:00

Sheet C	1	2	3	4	5	6	7	8	9	10	Final
Germany (Stock)	1	0	1	0	0	2	0	0	2	0	6
Sweden (Lindholm)	0	1	0	2	0	0	1	2	0	1	7

Player percentages
Germany		Sweden	
Markus Messenzehl	91%	Peter Narup	75%
Stephan Knoll	76%	Magnus Swartling	76%
Daniel Herberg	71%	Tomas Nordin	84%
Sebastian Stock	84%	Peter Lindholm	79%
Total	80%	Total	78%

2004 Ford World Curling Championship
(Sweden)
Sweden
5th title

== Player percentages ==
Leads	%	Seconds	%	Thirds	%	Skips	%
(United States) Bill Todhunter	85	(Norway) Flemming Davanger	83	(Sweden) Tomas Nordin	78	(Canada) Mark Dacey	83
(Canada) Andrew Gibson	82	(Sweden) Magnus Swartling	79	(Canada) Bruce Lohnes	77	(Sweden) Peter Lindholm	82
(Switzerland) Thomas Hoch	82	(Switzerland) Daniel Widmer	76	(Scotland) Warwick Smith	77	(Scotland) Ewan MacDonald	78
(Norway) Bent Ånund Ramsfjell	79	(Scotland) David Hay	74	(Denmark) Lars Vilandt	77	(Norway) Pål Trulsen	76
(Sweden) Peter Narup	79	(Canada) Robert Harris	74	(Norway) Lars Vågberg	75	(Germany) Sebastian Stock	76
