= Bernhard Werthemann =

Swiss male curler and coach

- Curler ♂
- Born: 1966 or 1967 (age 59–60)

Team
- Curling club: Basel-Ysfäger CC, Basel

Curling career
- Member Association: Switzerland
- World Championship: 1 (2004)
- European Championship: 1 (2003)
Medal record
Curling
Swiss Men's Championship
Gold medal – first place	2003
Silver medal – second place	1999
Silver medal – second place	2013

Bernhard Werthemann (born 1966 or 1967) is a Swiss curler and curling coach.

At the national level, he is a 2003 Swiss men's champion curler.

Currently he is the coach of team Yannick Schwaller.

== Teams ==
Season	Skip	Third	Second	Lead	Alternate	Coach	Events
1998–99	Bernhard Werthemann	Raphael Brütsch	Peter Loosli	Phillip Raspe			SMCC 1999 (silver)
1999–00	Bernhard Werthemann	Raphael Brütsch	Thomas Lips	Peter Loosli	Daniel Portmann		
2000–01	Bernhard Werthemann	Raphael Brütsch	Thomas Lips	Phillip Raspe			
2002–03	Bernhard Werthemann	Thomas Lips	Thomas Hoch	Daniel Widmer	Stefan Traub		SMCC 2003 (gold)
2003–04	Bernhard Werthemann	Thomas Lips	Thomas Hoch	Daniel Widmer	Stefan Traub	Didier Chabloz	ECC 2003 (4th)
2003–04	Bernhard Werthemann	Thomas Lips	Daniel Widmer	Thomas Hoch	Stefan Traub	Didier Chabloz	WCC 2004 (6th)
2004–05	Bernhard Werthemann	Thomas Lips	Stefan Traub	Thomas Hoch			SMCC 2005 (5th)
2006–07	Bernhard Werthemann	Stefan Häsler	Patrick Spychiger	Remo Schmid			
2007–08	Bernhard Werthemann	Stefan Häsler	Patrick Spychiger	Remo Schmid			
2008–09	Bernhard Werthemann	Martin Zaugg	Daniel Widmer	Thomas Hoch			
2009–10	Bernhard Werthemann	Thomas Hoch	Daniel Widmer	Patrick Glanzmann			SMCC 2010 (8th)
2010–11	Bernhard Werthemann	Roger Stucki	Daniel Widmer	Bastian Brun			SMCC 2011 (6th)
2011–12	Bernhard Werthemann	Bastian Brun	Daniel Widmer	Roger Stucki			
2011–12	Bernhard Werthemann	Bastian Brun	Daniel Widmer	Raphael Brütsch			SMCC 2012 (6th)
2012–13	Bernhard Werthemann	Bastian Brun	Florian Zürrer	Paddy Käser	Raphael Brütsch, Gilles Vuille	Didier Chabloz	SMCC 2013 (silver)
2013–14	Bernhard Werthemann	Bastian Brun	Yves Hess	Paddy Käser			

== Record as a coach of national teams ==
Year	Tournament, event	National team	Place
2016	2016 World Junior Curling Championships	Switzerland (junior men)	4
2018	2018–19 Curling World Cup – Second Leg	Switzerland (men)	6
2019	2018–19 Curling World Cup – Grand Final	Switzerland (men)	5
2019	2019 European Curling Championships	Switzerland (men)	2nd place, silver medalist(s)
2025	2025 Pre-Olympic Qualification Event	Philippines (men)	1
2025	2025 Pan Continental Curling Championships	Philippines (men)	6
