= Benno Arnold =

Holocaust victim

Benno Arnold (born 21 November 1876 in Augsburg; died 3 March 1944 in the Theresienstadt ghetto) was a German Jewish textile industry entrepreneur in Augsburg who was murdered in the Holocaust.

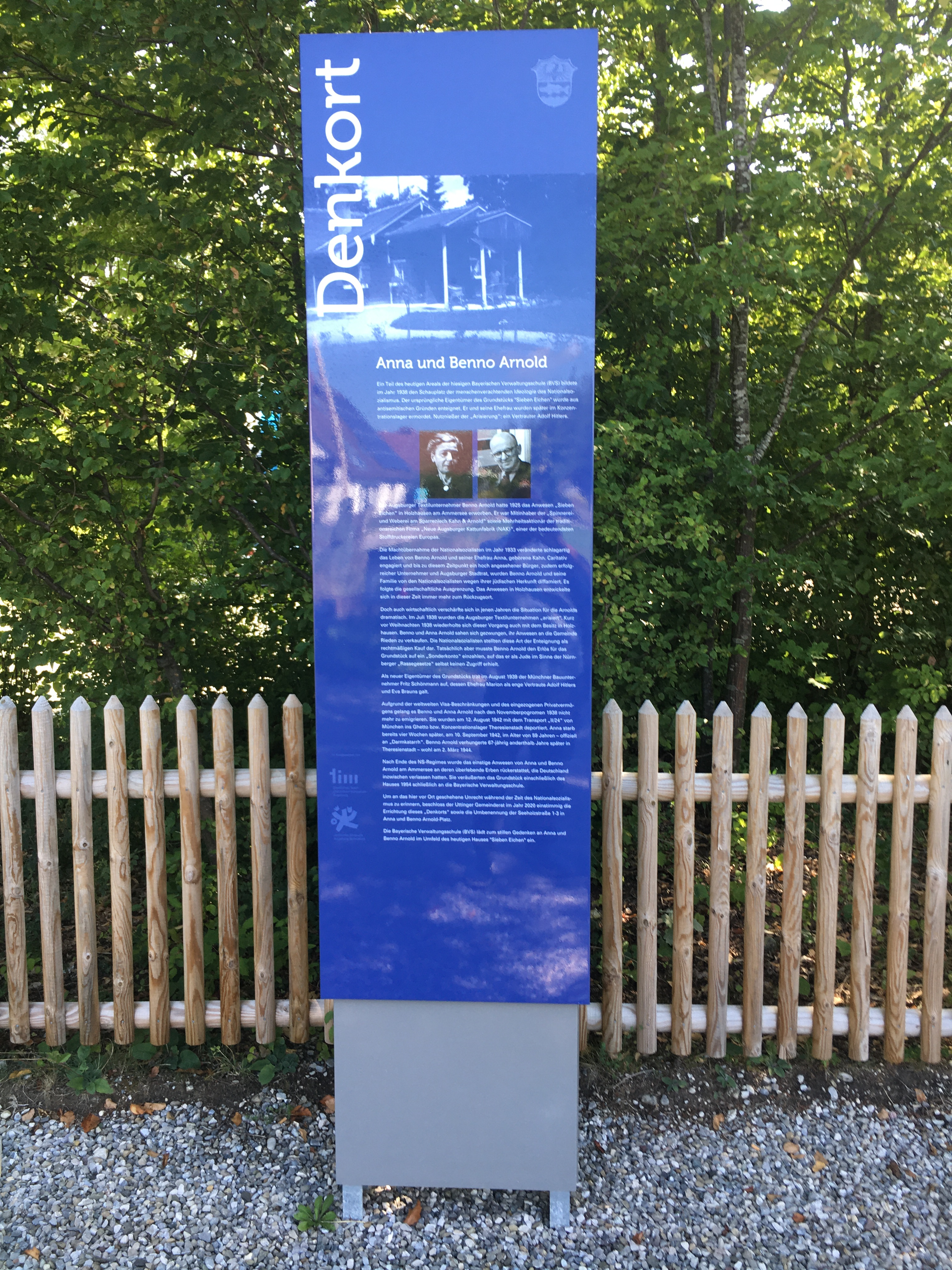
Informationstafel zu Anna und Benno Arnold in Holzhausen

== Life ==
Benno Arnold was a son of the upper middle-class Augsburg textile entrepreneur Kommerzienrat Albert Arnold (1844-1913), who came from Jebenhausen, and his wife Hermine Arnold née Vogel (1853-1919), bearer of the King Ludwig Cross. Arnold became a member of the German Democratic Party in the Weimar Republic and was a deputy for it in the Augsburg City Council from 1920. He became co-owner of his father's cotton spinning and weaving mill Spinnerei und Weberei am Sparrenlech Kahn & Arnold, which had 940 employees in 1933 despite the world economic crisis. From the founders Albert Arnold (1844-1913) and Aaron Kahn (1841-1926) the factory had passed to Benno and Arthur Arnold (1880-1941) as well as Alfred Kahn (1876-1956) and Berthold Kahn (* 1879), who managed it at the time of the transfer of power to the National Socialists in the Reich.

The company was Aryanized in 1938. In 1940 it was transferred to the Neue Augsburger Kattunfabrik (NAK). The Kahn and Arnold families received nothing for the factory. After the end of the Second World War, a questionable compensation came about.

The Kahn brothers, who were related to him by marriage, were able to emigrate with their family to London and Bombay respectively. Benno Arnold was deputy head of the Israelite religious community and board member of the Jewish old people's home. In 1941, he had to take over the board of the Augsburg Jewish community and help organize the evictions and deportations. The brother Arthur Arnold was deported to the concentration camp Dachau on 25 September 1941 and was murdered there on 23 November 1941. The sister Luise Ellinger was deported to Theresienstadt on 12 August 1942. Finally, he too was deported to the Theresienstadt ghetto on 30 August 1942, together with his wife Anna née Kahn (1882-1942), where Anna died after only a few weeks in September 1942. Benno Arnold died there in March 1944.

In 1928, Benno Arnold had acquired the spacious "Sieben Eichen" estate in Holzhausen am Ammersee. At the end of 1938, he was forced to sell the stately property to the municipality for a nominal price. The new owners were the Munich building contractor Fritz Schönmann and his wife Marion who were close to Adolf Hitler and Eva Braun. After the Allies defeated Nazi Germany, the estate was returned to the surviving heirs. On 27 January 2022, Holocaust Remembrance Day, at the request of the "Jewish Museum Augsburg Swabia" Foundation in Holzhausen am Ammersee, "Seehholzstraße 1-3" was unnamed "Anna und Benno Arnold-Platz".

== Photo ==
- Photo of Benno Arnold in the Yad Vashem Photo Archive

== Memorials ==
Im Staatlichen Textil- und Industriemuseum in Augsburg wird die Deportation Arnolds erwähnt.

== Literature ==
- Joseph Walk (Hrsg.): Kurzbiographien zur Geschichte der Juden 1918–1945. Hrsg. vom Leo Baeck Institute, Jerusalem. Saur, München 1988, ISBN 3-598-10477-4.
- Gernot Römer (Hrsg.): "An meine Gemeinde in der Zerstreuung". Die Rundbriefe des Augsburger Rabbiners Ernst Jacob (1941–1949). Augsburg 2007.
- Benno Arnold, in: E. G. Lowenthal (Hrsg.): Bewährung im Untergang. Ein Gedenkbuch. Stuttgart : Deutsche Verlags-Anstalt, 1965, S. 17f.
