= Lionel Roux (curler) =

French curler (born 1970)

- Curler ♂
- Born: 19 November 1970 (age 55); Megève, Haute-Savoie, France

Team
- Curling club: Combloux CC, Chamonix CC, Massilia CC, Marseille

Curling career
- Member Association: France
- World Championship: 3 (2004, 2011, 2012)
- World Mixed Doubles Championship: 1 (2008)
- European Championship: 4 (2003, 2010, 2011, 2012)
- Other appearances: European Mixed Championship: 5 (2008, 2009, 2011, 2013, 2014), World Junior Championships: 1 (1989)

Lionel Roux (born 19 November 1970 in Megève, Haute-Savoie, France) is a French curler and curling coach.

== Teams ==
=== Men's ===
Season	Skip	Third	Second	Lead	Alternate	Coach	Events
1988–89	Christian Cossetto	Laurent Hue	Lionel Roux	Fabrice Tournier			WJCC 1989 (9th)
2003–04	Thomas Dufour	Philippe Caux	Lionel Roux	Tony Angiboust	Julien Charlet	Hervé Poirot (ECC, WCC); Bruno-Denis Dubois (WCC)	ECC 2003 (7th); WCC 2004 (10th)
2010–11	Tony Angiboust (fourth)	Thomas Dufour (skip)	Lionel Roux	Wilfrid Coulot	Jan Ducroz	Phillippe Bertrand (ECC); Jan Ducroz (WCC)	ECC 2010 (8th); WCC 2011 (5th)
2011–12	Tony Angiboust (fourth)	Thomas Dufour (skip)	Lionel Roux	Wilfrid Coulot	Jérémy Frarier	Björn Schröder	ECC 2011 (8th); WCC 2012 (10th)
2012–13	Thomas Dufour	Lionel Roux	Wilfrid Coulot	Jérémy Frarier	Tony Angiboust	Björn Schröder, Alain Contat	ECC 2012 (8th)

=== Mixed ===
Season	Skip	Third	Second	Lead	Alternate	Coach	Events
2008–09	Lionel Roux	Helène Grieshaber	Xavier Bibollet	Candice Santacru	Alain Contat, Marion Renaud		EMxCC 2008 (14th)
2009–10	Lionel Roux	Helène Grieshaber	Xavier Bibollet	Marion Renaud	Alain Contat, Emma Ferrari		EMxCC 2009 (13th)
2011–12	Lionel Roux	Helène Grieshaber	Xavier Bibollet	Candice Santacru	Alain Contat	Alain Contat	EMxCC 2011 (14th)
2013–14	Lionel Roux	Helène Grieshaber	Xavier Bibollet	Florence Richard			EMxCC 2013 (19th)
2014–15	Lionel Roux	Helène Grieshaber	Xavier Bibollet	Florence Richard			EMxCC 2014 (16th)

=== Mixed doubles ===
Season	Female	Male	Coach	Events
2007–08	Helène Grieshaber	Lionel Roux	Alain Contat	WMDCC 2008 (12th)

== Record as a coach of national teams ==
Year	Tournament, event	National team	Place
2011	2011 European Curling Championships	France (women)	21
