= Raphael Brütsch =

Swiss curler (born 1971)

Medal record

Curling

European Championships
Gold medal – first place	2006	A Group

Raphael Brütsch (born 3 August 1971) is a Swiss curler.

Brütsch started playing curling in 1984. He is right-handed.
