= Thomas Lips =

Swiss curler and coach

- Curler
- Born: 27 February 1970 (age 56); Urdorf

Team
- Curling club: CC Baden Regio, Baden

Curling career
- World Championship: 1 (2004)
- European Championship: 3 (1991, 2003, 2006)
Medal record
Curling
European Championships
Gold medal – first place	2006 Basel	A Group
Bronze medal – third place	1991 Chamonix	A Group
European Mixed Championship
Gold medal – first place	2011 Tårnby

Thomas Lips (born 27 February 1970) is a Swiss curler from Buchs, Zürich. Lips was a member of the Swiss team that won the 2006 European Curling Championships.

== Curling career ==
Lips started playing curling in 1977. He won a bronze medal at the 1991 European Curling Championships, playing lead for Daniel Model. He would not return the Euros until 2003. Playing third for Bernhard Werthemann, they finished fourth. They finished sixth at the 2004 Ford World Men's Curling Championship. In 2006, playing second for Andreas Schwaller, the team won the Euros, defeating Scotland in the final.

Lips currently skips his own team, which he took over in 2010, replacing Toni Müller, who will keep throwing last rocks. Prior to 2009, Lips played for Andreas Schwaller. In their first event, the 2010 Baden Masters, the hometown Lips rink defeated the new Brad Gushue/Randy Ferbey team in the final.

Lips was the coach of Russian Women's National Team and the German National Curling Teams. In June 2017 he returned to Switzerland for replacing Allan Moore as the National Coach in the Swiss Curling Association.

== Personal life ==
Lips is married.
