= 2003 European Curling Championships =

International curling competition

The 2003 European Curling Championships were held in Courmayeur, Italy December 5–13.

== Men's ==
=== A tournament ===
==== Final round robin standings ====
Team	Skip	W	L
Denmark	Ulrik Schmidt	8	1
Sweden	Peja Lindholm	7	2
Switzerland	Bernhard Werthemann	6	3
Scotland	David Murdoch	6	3
Norway	Thomas Ulsrud	5	4
Germany	Sebastian Stock	5	4
France	Thomas Dufour	4	5
Italy	Stefano Ferronato	2	7
Finland	Wille Mäkelä	2	7
England	James Dixon	0	9

==== Playoffs ====
Semi-final
1	Denmark	4
4	Scotland	6
2	Sweden	10
3	Switzerland	5

Final
4	Scotland	11
2	Sweden	5
Bronze medal
1	Denmark	9
3	Switzerland	8

===== Bronze-medal game =====
December 13th, 14:00

Sheet D	1	2	3	4	5	6	7	8	9	10	11	Final
Switzerland (Werthemann)	0	1	2	0	0	2	0	0	3	0	0	8
Denmark (Schmidt) 🔨	2	0	0	1	1	0	1	1	0	2	1	9

===== Gold-medal game =====
December 13th, 14:00

Sheet B	1	2	3	4	5	6	7	8	9	10	Final
Scotland (Murdoch) 🔨	2	0	2	0	1	0	3	3	X	X	11
Sweden (Lindholm)	0	1	0	2	0	2	0	0	X	X	5

==== Medals ====
Medal	Team
Gold	Scotland (David Murdoch, Craig Wilson, Neil Murdoch, Euan Byers, and Ronald Brewster)
Silver	Sweden (Peja Lindholm, Tomas Nordin, Magnus Swartling, Peter Narup, and Anders Kraupp)
Bronze	Denmark (Ulrik Schmidt, Lasse Lavrsen, Carsten Svensgaard, Joel Ostrowski, and Torkil Svensgaard)

== Women's ==
=== A tournament ===
==== Final round robin standings ====
Team	Skip	W	L
Sweden	Anette Norberg	9	0
Denmark	Dorthe Holm	6	3
Switzerland	Luzia Ebnöther	6	3
Scotland	Edith Loudon	6	3
Italy	Diana Gaspari	5	4
Norway	Dordi Nordby	5	4
Germany	Andrea Schöpp	4	5
Russia	Olga Jarkova	3	6
Czech Republic	Pavia Rubasova	1	8
England	Fiona Hawker	0	9

==== Playoffs ====
Semi-final
1	Sweden	9
4	Scotland	3
2	Denmark	5
3	Switzerland	6

Final
1	Sweden	7
3	Switzerland	6
Bronze medal
4	Scotland	4
2	Denmark	5

===== Semifinals =====
December 12th, 11:30

Sheet E	1	2	3	4	5	6	7	8	9	10	Final
Denmark (Holm) 🔨	0	0	0	1	0	0	0	2	2	0	5
Switzerland (Ebnöther)	0	0	1	0	1	1	2	0	0	1	6

Sheet C	1	2	3	4	5	6	7	8	9	10	Final
Sweden (Norberg) 🔨	1	0	0	4	0	0	2	0	2	X	9
Scotland (Loudon)	0	0	1	0	1	0	0	1	0	X	3

===== Bronze-medal game =====
December 13th, 10:00

Sheet D	1	2	3	4	5	6	7	8	9	10	11	Final
Scotland (Loudon)	1	0	0	0	0	1	1	0	0	1	0	4
Denmark (Holm) 🔨	0	1	1	0	0	0	0	0	2	0	1	5

===== Gold-medal game =====
December 13th, 10:00

Sheet B	1	2	3	4	5	6	7	8	9	10	Final
Switzerland (Ebnöther)	0	1	0	1	1	0	1	0	2	0	6
Sweden (Norberg) 🔨	0	0	1	0	0	1	0	3	0	2	7

==== Medals ====
Medal	Team
Gold	Sweden (Anette Norberg, Eva Lund, Cathrine Norberg, Anna Bergström, and Maria Prytz)
Silver	Switzerland (Luzia Ebnöther, Carmen Küng, Tanya Frei, Nadia Röthlisberger, and Laurence Bidaud)
Bronze	Denmark (Dorthe Holm, Malene Krause, Denise Dupont, Camilla Hansen, and Lisa Richardson)
