= 2012 Radisson Blu Oslo Cup =

World Curling Tour event

- Host city: Oslo, Norway
- Arena: Snarøen Curling Club
- Dates: September 20–23
- Men's winner: (Sweden) Niklas Edin
- Curling club: Karlstad, Sweden
- Skip: Niklas Edin
- Third: Sebastian Kraupp
- Second: Fredrik Lindberg
- Lead: Viktor Kjäll
- Finalist: (Finland) Markku Uusipaavalniemi
- Women's winner: (Canada) Sherry Middaugh
- Curling club: Coldwater, Canada
- Skip: Sherry Middaugh
- Third: Jo-Ann Rizzo
- Second: Lee Merklinger
- Lead: Leigh Armstrong
- Finalist: (Sweden) Margaretha Sigfridsson

The 2012 Radisson Blu Oslo Cup was held from September 20 to 23 at the Snarøen Curling Club in Oslo, Norway as part of the 2012–13 World Curling Tour. The event was held in a round robin format, and the purses of the men's and women's events were 160,000 and 100,000 krona, respectively. Niklas Edin of Sweden won the men's event for the third consecutive year, and Canada's Sherry Middaugh won the women's event.

== Men ==
=== Teams ===
The teams are listed as follows:

Skip	Third	Second	Lead	Locale
Evgeny Arkhipov	Sergei Glukhov	Dmitry Mironov	Arthu Ali	Moscow, Russia
Tom Brewster	Greg Drummond	Scott Andrews	Michael Goodfellow	Aberdeen, Scotland
Tony Angiboust (fourth)	Thomas Dufour (skip)	Lionel Roux	Wilfrid Coulot	Chamonix, France
Niklas Edin	Sebastian Kraupp	Fredrik Lindberg	Viktor Kjäll	Karlstad, Sweden
Kristian Lindström (fourth)	Oskar Eriksson (skip)	Markus Eriksson	Christoffer Sundgren	Lit, Sweden
Ritvars Gulbis	Ainārs Gulbis	Normunds Šaršūns	Aivars Avotinš	Riga, Latvia
Grant Hardie	Jay McWilliam	Hammy McMillan Jr.	Billy Morton	Dumfries, Scotland
Stefan Häsler	Christian Bangerter	Christian Roth	Jörg Lüthy	Switzerland
Marcus Hasselborg	Peder Folke	Andreas Prytz	Anton Sandström	Sweden
Felix Schulze (fourth)	John Jahr (skip)	Peter Rickmers	Sven Goldemann	Hamburg, Germany
Andy Lang	Andy Kapp	Daniel Herberg	Andreas Kempf	Füssen, Germany
Aku Kauste	Jani Sullanmaa	Pauli Jäämies	Janne Pirko	Hyvinkaa, Finland
Thomas Løvold	Thomas Due	Steffen Walstad	Sander Rølvåg	Oslo, Norway
Steffen Mellemseter	Markus Høiberg	Håvard Mellem	Magnus Nedregotten	Oslo, Norway
Eirik Mjøen	Markus Skogvold	Sebastian Mellemseter	Martin Sesaker	Norway
Glen Muirhead	David Reid	Steven Mitchell	Kerr Drummond	Scotland
Fabio Sola	Julien Genre	Simone Sola	Graziano Iacovetti	Italy
Jean-Francois Royer	David Vallires	Raphael Gendron	Jean-Oliver Hay	Montreal, Quebec, Canada
Kyle Smith	Thomas Muirhead	Kyle Waddell	Cammy Smith	Scotland
Rasmus Stjerne	Johnny Frederiksen	Mikkel Poulsen	Troels Harry	Hvidovre, Denmark
Torkil Svensgaard	Kenneth Jørgensen	Martin Uhd Grønbech	Daniel Abrahamsen	Hvidovre, Denmark
Alexey Tselousov	Alexey Stukalsky	Andrey Drozdov	Artur Razhabov	Moscow, Russia
Thomas Ulsrud	Torger Nergård	Christoffer Svae	Håvard Vad Petersson	Oslo, Norway
Markku Uusipaavalniemi	Toni Anttila	Kasper Hakunti	Joni Ikonen	Helsinki, Finland
Rasmus Wranå	Jordan Wåhlin	Daniel Lövstrand	Axel Sjöberg	Sweden

=== Round-robin standings ===
Key
Teams to Playoffs
Teams to Qualifiers
Teams to Tiebreakers

Pool A	W	L
(Denmark) Torkil Svensgaard	4	0
(France) Thomas Dufour	2	2
(Scotland) Kyle Smith	2	2
(Germany) John Jahr	1	3
(Norway) Eirik Mjøen	1	3

Pool B	W	L
(Sweden) Oskar Eriksson	3	1
(Germany) Andy Lang	3	1
(Finland) Aku Kauste	2	2
(Scotland) Tom Brewster	1	3
(Switzerland) Stefan Hasler	1	3

Pool C	W	L
(Denmark) Rasmus Stjerne	3	1
(Latvia) Ritvars Gulbis	2	2
(Scotland) Glen Muirhead	2	2
(Norway) Steffen Mellemseter	2	2
(Sweden) Rasmus Wranå	1	3

Pool D	W	L
(Norway) Thomas Ulsrud	4	0
(Finland) Markku Uusipaavalniemi	2	2
(Sweden) Marcus Hasselborg	2	2
(Italy) Fabio Sola	1	3
(Russia) Alexey Tselousov	1	3

Pool E	W	L
(Sweden) Niklas Edin	4	0
(Scotland) Grant Hardie	3	1
(Norway) Thomas Løvold	2	2
(Canada) Jean-Francois Royer	1	3
(Russia) Evgeny Arkhipov	0	4

=== Tiebreakers ===
Team	Final
(Latvia) Ritvars Gulbis	4
(Scotland) Glen Muirhead 🔨	2

Team	Final
(Latvia) Ritvars Gulbis 🔨	3
(Norway) Steffen Mellemseter	4

=== Playoffs ===
Qualifiers
(Norway) Steffen Mellemseter	1
(France) Thomas Dufour	6
(Germany) Andy Lang	4
(Finland) Markku Uusipaavalniemi	6

Quarterfinals
(Sweden) Niklas Edin	8
(France) Thomas Dufour	3
(Denmark) Rasmus Stjerne	3
(Norway) Thomas Ulsrud	4
(Finland) Markku Uusipaavalniemi	5
(Sweden) Oskar Eriksson	4
(Scotland) Grant Hardie	5
(Denmark) Torkil Svensgaard	4

Semifinals
(Sweden) Niklas Edin	6
(Norway) Thomas Ulsrud	4
(Finland) Markku Uusipaavalniemi	7
(Scotland) Grant Hardie	5

Final
(Sweden) Niklas Edin	8
(Finland) Markku Uusipaavalniemi	1

== Women ==
=== Teams ===
The teams are listed as follows:

Skip	Third	Second	Lead	Locale
Mary-Anne Arsenault	Colleen Jones	Kim Kelly	Jennifer Baxter	Halifax, Canada
Kristine Davanger	Malin Frondell Løchen	Julie Molnar	Ingvild Skaga	Oslo, Norway
Madeleine Dupont	Denise Dupont	Christine Svendsen	Lina Knudsen	Hvidovre, Denmark
Binia Feltscher-Beeli	Marlene Albrecht	Fraenzi Kaufmann	Christine Urech	Flims, Switzerland
Satsuki Fujisawa	Miyo Ichikawa	Emi Shimizu	Miyuki Satoh	Karuizawa, Japan
Linn Githmark	Henriette Løvar	Ingrid Stensrud	Kristin Skaslien	Oslo, Norway
Anna Hasselborg	Karin Rudström	Agnes Knochenhauer	Zandra Flyg	Sweden
Michèle Jäggi	Marisa Winkelhausen	Stéphanie Jäggi	Melanie Barbezat	Bern, Switzerland
Angelina Jensen	Camilla Jensen	Ane Hansen	Ivana Bratic	Hvidovre, Denmark
Ditte Kalsson	Mikaela Törnkvist	Frida Lideberg	Kristin Svensson	Sweden
Linda Klímová	Lenka Černovská	Kamila Mošová	Katerina Urbanová	Czech Republic
Jonna McManus	Sara McManus	Anna Huhta	Sofia Mabergs	Sweden
Sherry Middaugh	Jo-Ann Rizzo	Lee Merklinger	Leigh Armstrong	Coldwater, Canada
Eve Muirhead	Anna Sloan	Vicki Adams	Claire Hamilton	Stirling, Scotland
Anette Norberg	Cecilia Östlund	Sabina Kraupp	Sara Carlsson	Härnösand, Sweden
Mirjam Ott	Carmen Schäfer	Carmen Küng	Janine Greiner	Davos, Switzerland
Sanna Puustinen	Heidi Hossi	Eszter Juhász	Oona Kauste	Finland
Marianne Rørvik	Anneline Skårsmoen	Kjersti Husby	Camila Holth	Norway
Manuela Siegrist	Alina Pätz	Claudia Hug	Nicole Dunki	Basel, Switzerland
Maria Prytz (fourth)	Christina Bertrup	Maria Wennerström	Margaretha Sigfridsson (skip)	Umeå, Sweden
Heather Smith-Dacey	Stephanie McVicar	Blisse Comstock	Teri Lake	Halifax, Canada
Ildikó Szekeres	Alexandra Béres	Boglárka Ádám	Blanka Pathy-Dencsö	Budapest, Hungary
Silvana Tirinzoni	Irene Schori	Esther Neuenschwander	Sandra Gantenbein	Aarau, Switzerland
Ellen Vogt	Riikka Louhivuori	Tiina Suuripaa	Maija Salmiovirta	Finland
Olga Zharkova	Julia Portunova	Alisa Tregub	Julia Guzieva	Kaliningrad, Russia

=== Round-robin standings ===
Key
Teams to Playoffs
Teams to Qualifiers
Teams to Tiebreakers

Pool A	W	L
(Sweden) Anette Norberg	4	0
(Switzerland) Binia Feltscher-Beeli	2	2
(Norway) Marianne Rørvik	2	2
(Canada) Mary-Anne Arsenault	1	3
(Czech Republic) Linda Klímová	1	3

Pool B	W	L
(Russia) Olga Zharkova	4	0
(Switzerland) Mirjam Ott	3	1
(Sweden) Anna Hasselborg	2	2
(Denmark) Angelina Jensen	1	3
(Hungary) Ildikó Szekeres	0	4

Pool C	W	L
(Canada) Sherry Middaugh	3	1
(Sweden) Jonna McManus	3	1
(Switzerland) Michèle Jäggi	2	2
(Norway) Linn Githmark	1	3
(Finland) Ellen Vogt	1	3

Pool D	W	L
(Switzerland) Silvana Tirinzoni	4	0
(Japan) Satsuki Fujisawa	2	2
(Finland) Sanna Puustinen	2	2
(Scotland) Eve Muirhead	2	2
(Sweden) Ditte Karlsson	0	4

Pool E	W	L
(Sweden) Margaretha Sigfridsson	4	0
(Denmark) Madeleine Dupont	3	1
(Switzerland) Manuela Siegrist	2	2
(Norway) Kristine Davanger	1	3
(Canada) Heather Smith-Dacey	0	4

=== Tiebreakers ===
Team	Final
(Finland) Sanna Puustinen	1
(Japan) Satsuki Fujisawa 🔨	8

Team	Final
(Scotland) Eve Muirhead 🔨	4
(Japan) Satsuki Fujisawa	5

=== Playoffs ===
Qualifiers
(Switzerland) Mirjam Ott	6
(Denmark) Madeleine Dupont	1
(Sweden) Jonna McManus	6
(Japan) Satsuki Fujisawa	5

Quarterfinals
(Switzerland) Silvana Tirinzoni	7
(Switzerland) Mirjam Ott	3
(Sweden) Margaretha Sigfridsson	6
(Sweden) Anette Norberg	4
(Russia) Olga Zharkova	11
(Sweden) Jonna McManus	3
(Canada) Sherry Middaugh	7
(Switzerland) Binia Feltscher-Beeli	6

Semifinals
(Switzerland) Silvana Tirinzoni	3
(Sweden) Margaretha Sigfridsson	7
(Russia) Olga Zharkova	4
(Canada) Sherry Middaugh	7

Final
(Sweden) Margaretha Sigfridsson	3
(Canada) Sherry Middaugh	5
