= 2011 Radisson Blu Oslo Cup =

- Host city: Oslo, Norway
- Arena: Snarøen Curling Club
- Dates: September 22–25
- Men's winner: (Sweden) Niklas Edin
- Curling club: Karlstad, Sweden
- Skip: Niklas Edin
- Third: Sebastian Kraupp
- Second: Fredrik Lindberg
- Lead: Viktor Kjäll
- Finalist: (Scotland) Tom Brewster
- Women's winner: (Canada) Jennifer Jones
- Curling club: Winnipeg, Manitoba
- Skip: Jennifer Jones
- Third: Kaitlyn Lawes
- Second: Jill Officer
- Lead: Dawn Askin
- Finalist: (Sweden) Margaretha Sigfridsson

The 2011 Radisson Blu Oslo Cup was held from September 22 to 25 at Snarøen Curling Club in Oslo, Norway as part of the 2011–12 World Curling Tour. The purses of the men's and women's events were 160,000 and 100,000 krona, respectively. The event was held in a round-robin format.

== Men ==
=== Teams ===
Skip	Third	Second	Lead	Locale
Evgeniy Arkhipov	Sergei Glukhov	Dmitry Mironov	Arthu Ali	Russia
Christian Bangerter	Stefan Schori	Daniel Inversini	Jurg Stettler	Switzerland
Felix Schulze (fourth)	Christopher Bartsch (skip)	Sven Goldemann	Peter Rickmers	Germany
Tom Brewster	Greg Drummond	Scott Andrews	Michael Goodfellow	Aberdeen, Scotland
Niklas Edin	Sebastian Kraupp	Fredrik Lindberg	Viktor Kjäll	Karlstad, Sweden
David Edwards	John Penny	Scott MacLeod	Colin Campbell	Aberdeen, Scotland
Kristian Lindström (fourth)	Oskar Eriksson (skip)	Henrik Leek	Alexander Lindström	Lit, Sweden
Logan Gray	Alasdair Guthrie	Steve Mitchell	Sandy Gilmour	Stirling, Scotland
Ritvars Gulbis	Ainārs Gulbis	Normunds Šaršūns	Aivars Avotinš	Riga, Latvia
Krisztián Hall	György Nagy	Gábor Észöl	Lajos Belleli	Hungary
Marcus Hasselborg	Peder Folke	Andreas Prytz	Anton Sandström	Sweden
Aku Kauste	Jani Sullanmaa	Pauli Jäämies	Janne Pirko	Finland
Kalle Kiiskinen	Perttu Piilo	Juha Pekaristo	Paavo Kuosmanen	Finland
Aleksandr Kirikov	Artem Shmakov	Anton Kalalb	Artur Razhabov	Russia
Andy Lang	Daniel Herberg	Markus Messenzehl	Daniel Neuner	Füssen, Germany
Thomas Løvold	Thomas Due	Steffen Walstad	Sander Rølvåg	Norway
Jay McWilliam	Colin Dick	Grant Hardie	Billy Morton	Edinburgh, Scotland
Steffen Mellemseter	Markus Høiberg	Håvard Mellem	Magnus Nedregotten	Norway
Claudio Pescia	Sven Iten	Reto Seiler	Rainer Kobler	St. Gallen, Switzerland
Manuel Ruch	Jean-Nicolas Longchamp	Daniel Graf	Renato Hächler	Switzerland
Christof Schwaller	Alexander Attinger	Robert Hürlimann	Felix Attinger	Switzerland
Joacim Suther	Henrik Holth	Jan-Erik Hansen	Rune Leistad	Norway
Torkil Svensgaard	Kenneth Jørgensen	Martin Uhd Grønbech	Daniel Abrahamsen	Hvidovre, Denmark
Thomas Ulsrud	Torger Nergård	Christoffer Svae	Håvard Vad Petersson	Oslo, Norway
Markku Uusipaavalniemi	Toni Anttila	Kasper Hakunti	Joni Ikonen	Helsinki, Finland

=== Round Robin Standings ===
Key
Teams to Playoffs
Teams to Qualifiers
Teams to Tiebreakers

Pool A	W	L
(Sweden) Marcus Hasselborg	3	1
(Scotland) Tom Brewster	3	1
(Norway) Joacim Suther	2	2
(Finland) Markku Uusipaavalniemi	1	2
(Switzerland) Christian Bangerter	0	3

Pool B	W	L
(Sweden) Oskar Eriksson	4	0
(Hungary) Krisztián Hall	3	1
(Russia) Aleksandr Kirikov	2	2
(Switzerland) Claudio Pescia	1	3
(Germany) Andy Lang	0	4

Pool C	W	L
(Scotland) David Edwards	4	0
(Sweden) Niklas Edin	3	1
(Finland) Kalle Kiiskinen	2	2
(Germany) Christopher Bartsch	1	3
(Norway) Thomas Løvold	0	4

Pool D	W	L
(Scotland) Jay McWilliam	4	0
(Latvia) Ritvars Gulbis	2	2
(Norway) Steffen Mellemseter	2	2
(Switzerland) Christof Schwaller	2	2
(Denmark) Torkil Svensgaard	0	4

Pool E	W	L
(Norway) Thomas Ulsrud	4	0
(Switzerland) Manuel Ruch	2	2
(Finland) Aku Kauste	2	2
(Russia) Evgeniy Arkhipov	1	3
(Scotland) Logan Gray	1	3

=== Tiebreakers ===
Team	Final
(Switzerland) Christof Schwaller	2
(Norway) Steffen Mellemseter	3

Team	Final
(Norway) Steffen Mellemseter	8
(Latvia) Ritvars Gulbis	2

=== Qualifiers ===
Team	Final
(Scotland) Tom Brewster	8
(Switzerland) Manuel Ruch	6

Team	Final
(Sweden) Niklas Edin	7
(Hungary) Krisztián Hall	3

=== Playoffs ===
Quarterfinals
(Scotland) David Edwards	2
(Scotland) Tom Brewster	6
(Sweden) Oskar Eriksson	7
(Norway) Steffen Mellemseter	1
(Sweden) Marcus Hasselborg	5
(Norway) Thomas Ulsrud	4
(Scotland) Jay McWilliam	6
(Sweden) Niklas Edin	8

Semifinals
(Scotland) Tom Brewster	7
(Sweden) Oskar Eriksson	2
(Sweden) Marcus Hasselborg	5
(Sweden) Niklas Edin	6

Final
(Scotland) Tom Brewster	4
(Sweden) Niklas Edin	7

== Women ==
=== Teams ===
Skip	Third	Second	Lead	Locale
Kristine Davanger	Malin Frondell Løchen	Julie Molnar	Ingvild Skaga	Norway
Daniela Driendl	Martina Linder	Marika Trettin	Gesa Angrick	Germany
Madeleine Dupont	Denise Dupont	Christine Svendsen	Lina Knudsen	Denmark
Binia Feltscher	Marlene Albrecht	Franziska Kaufmann	Christine Urech	Switzerland
Linn Githmark	Henriette Løvar	Ingrid Stensrud	Kristin Skaslien	Norway
Anna Hasselborg	Sabina Kraupp	Margaretha Dryburgh	Zandra Flyg	Sweden
Michèle Jäggi	Marisa Winkelhausen	Stéphanie Jäggi	Nicole Schwälgi	Switzerland
Jennifer Jones	Kaitlyn Lawes	Dawn Askin	Jennifer Clark-Rouire	Winnipeg, Canada
Eszter Juhász	Sanna Puustinen	Jenni Sullanmaa		Finland
Ditte Karlsson	Mikaela Tornkvist	Frida Lideberg	Helena Svensson	Sweden
Ineta Maca	Elēna Kāpostiņa	Rasa Lubarte	Ieva Rudzīte	Riga, Latvia
Victoria Makarshina	Anna Lobova	Oksana Gertova	Nadezhda Lepezina	Russia
Jonna McManus	Sara McManus	Anna Huhta	Sofia Mabergs	Sweden
Eve Muirhead	Anna Sloan	Vicki Adams	Claire Hamilton	Perth, Scotland
Heather Nedohin	Beth Iskiw	Jessica Mair	Laine Peters	Edmonton, Canada
Lene Nielsen	Helle Simonsen	Jeanne Ellegaard	Maria Poulsen	Denmark
Anette Norberg	Cecilia Östlund	Sara Carlsson	Liselotta Lennartsson	Harnosand, Sweden
Mirjam Ott	Carmen Schäfer	Carmen Küng	Janine Greiner	Switzerland
Sarah Reid	Rachael Simms	Lorna Vevers	Barbara McFarlane	Glasgow, Scotland
Marianne Rørvik	Anneline Skårsmoen	Kjersti Husby	Camila Holth	Norway
Margaretha Sigfridsson	Christina Bertrup	Maria Wennerström	Maria Prytz	Umea, Sweden
Ildikó Szekeres	Alexandra Béres	Boglárka Ádám	Blanka Pathy-Dencsö	Hungary
Silvana Tirinzoni	Irene Schori	Esther Neuenschwander	Sandra Gantenbein	Switzerland
Pia Trulsen	Nora Hilding	Marie Odnes	Stine Haalien	Norway
Wang Bingyu	Liu Yin	Yue Qingshuang	Zhou Yan	Harbin, China

=== Round Robin Standings ===
Key
Teams to Playoffs
Teams to Qualifiers
Teams to Tiebreakers

Pool A	W	L
(Switzerland) Mirjam Ott	3	1
(Sweden) Jonna McManus	3	1
(Germany) Daniela Driendl	2	2
(Norway) Linn Githmark	2	2
(Finland) Eszter Juhász	0	4

Pool B	W	L
(Canada) Jennifer Jones	4	0
(Sweden) Anna Hasselborg	2	2
(Denmark) Lene Nielsen	2	2
(Switzerland) Binia Feltscher	1	3
(Latvia) Ineta Maca	1	3

Pool C	W	L
(China) Wang Bingyu	3	1
(Canada) Heather Nedohin	3	1
(Scotland) Sarah Reid	3	1
(Sweden) Ditte Karlsson	1	3
(Norway) Pia Trulsen	0	4

Pool D	W	L
(Sweden) Margaretha Sigfridsson	3	1
(Scotland) Eve Muirhead	3	1
(Switzerland) Michèle Jäggi	3	1
(Russia) Victoria Makaharina	1	3
(Norway) Kristine Davanger	0	4

Pool E	W	L
(Sweden) Anette Norberg	4	0
(Switzerland) Silvana Tirinzoni	3	1
(Norway) Marianne Rørvik	1	3
(Hungary) Ildikó Szekeres	1	3
(Denmark) Madeline Dupont	1	3

=== Tiebreakers ===
Team	Final
(Scotland) Eve Muirhead	4
(Switzerland) Michèle Jäggi	3

Team	Final
(Canada) Heather Nedohin	6
(Scotland) Sarah Reid	5

=== Qualifiers ===
Team	Final
(Sweden) Anna Hasselborg	3
(Sweden) Jonna McManus	5

Team	Final
(Switzerland) Silvana Tirinzoni	1
(Scotland) Eve Muirhead	8

=== Playoffs ===
Quarterfinals
(China) Wang Bingyu	4
(Scotland) Eve Muirhead	5
(Canada) Jennifer Jones	6
(Sweden) Jonna McManus	3
(Switzerland) Mirjam Ott	4
(Canada) Heather Nedohin	3
(Sweden) Margaretha Sigfridsson	7
(Sweden) Anette Norberg	4

Semifinals
(Scotland) Eve Muirhead	3
(Canada) Jennifer Jones	7
(Switzerland) Mirjam Ott	4
(Sweden) Margaretha Sigfridsson	6

Final
(Canada) Jennifer Jones	5
(Sweden) Margaretha Sigfridsson	4
