= Kraupp =

Kraupp is a surname. Notable people with the surname include:

- Anders Kraupp (born 1959), Swedish curler and curling coach, father of Sabina and Sebastian
- Sabina Kraupp (born 1986), Swedish curler
- Sebastian Kraupp (born 1985), Swedish curler
