= 2008 World Men's Curling Championship =

- Host city: Grand Forks, North Dakota, USA
- Arena: Ralph Engelstad Arena
- Dates: April 4–13, 2008
- Attendance: 51,731
- Winner: Canada
- Curling club: Saville SC, Edmonton, Alberta
- Skip: Kevin Martin
- Third: John Morris
- Second: Marc Kennedy
- Lead: Ben Hebert
- Alternate: Adam Enright
- Coach: Jules Owchar
- Finalist: Scotland (David Murdoch)

The 2008 World Men's Curling Championship was held from April 4–13, 2008 at Ralph Engelstad Arena in Grand Forks, North Dakota in the USA. The 12-team tournament took place in the 11,643 seat hockey arena on the grounds of the University of North Dakota.

== Teams ==
Australia	Canada	China
Sydney Harbour CC, Sydney Skip: Hugh Millikin*; Fourth: Ian Palangio; Second: Sean Hall; Lead: Stephen Johns; Alternate: Stephen Hewitt (*Throws third rocks)	Saville Sports Centre, Edmonton Skip: Kevin Martin; Third: John Morris; Second: Marc Kennedy; Lead: Ben Hebert; Alternate: Adam Enright	Harbin CC, Harbin Skip: Wang Fengchun; Third: Liu Rui; Second: Xu Xiaoming; Lead: Zang Jialang; Alternate: Li Dongyan
Czech Republic	Denmark	France
CK Brno, Brno Skip: Jiří Snítil; Third: Martin Snítil; Second: Jindřich Kitzberger; Lead: Marek Vydra; Alternate: Miloš Hoferka	Hvidovre CC, Hvidovre Skip: Johnny Frederiksen; Third: Lars Vilandt; Second: Bo Jensen; Lead: Ulrik Schmidt; Alternate: Mikkel Poulson	Chamonix CC, Chamonix Skip: Thomas Dufour; Third: Tony Angiboust; Second: Jan Ducroz; Lead: Richard Ducroz; Alternate: Raphael Mathieu
Germany	Norway	Scotland
CC Füssen, Füssen Skip: Andy Kapp; Third: Andreas Lang; Second: Holger Höhne; Lead: Andreas Kempf; Alternate: Felix Schulze	Snarøen CK, Bærum Skip: Thomas Ulsrud; Third: Torger Nergård; Second: Christoffer Svae; Lead: Havard Vad Petersson; Alternate: Thomas Due	Lockerbie Ice Rink, Lockerbie Skip: David Murdoch; Third: Graeme Connal; Second: Peter Smith; Lead: Euan Byers; Alternate: Peter Loudon
Sweden	Switzerland	United States
Stocksunds CC, Stocksund Skip: Anders Kraupp; Third: Peder Folke; Second: Björn Brandberg; Lead: Anton Sandström; Alternate: Mats Nyberg	CC St. Galler Bär, St. Gallen Skip: Claudio Pescia; Third: Patrick Hürlimann; Second: Pascal Sieber; Lead: Marco Battilana; Alternate: Toni Müller	St. Paul CC, St. Paul & Madison CC, Madison Skip: Craig Brown; Third: Rich Ruohonen; Second: John Dunlop; Lead: Pete Annis; Alternate: Kevin Kakela

== Round-robin standings ==
Country	Skip	W	L	PF	PA	Ends Won	Ends Lost	Blank Ends	Stolen Ends	Shot Pct.
Canada	Kevin Martin	10	1	87	47	49	37	10	14	87%
Scotland	David Murdoch	8	3	74	54	46	38	20	10	85%
China	Wang Fengchun	7	4	66	65	43	43	18	9	81%
Norway	Thomas Ulsrud	7	4	80	72	52	47	10	11	84%
France	Thomas Dufour	6	5	63	53	42	35	18	11	78%
Australia	Hugh Millikin	5	6	62	64	42	45	20	8	78%
United States	Craig Brown	5	6	65	67	40	44	13	6	81%
Germany	Andy Kapp	5	6	73	72	47	43	17	14	80%
Denmark	Johnny Frederiksen	4	7	64	80	45	50	6	11	78%
Sweden	Anders Kraupp	4	7	61	77	38	49	17	4	79%
Switzerland	Claudio Pescia	3	8	63	78	42	49	15	7	78%
Czech Republic	Jiří Snítil	2	9	61	79	43	48	10	7	75%

== Round-robin results ==
=== Draw 1 ===
April 5, 14:00

Sheet A	1	2	3	4	5	6	7	8	9	10	Final
Norway (Ulsrud)	1	0	1	0	0	2	0	0	2	0	6
United States (Brown)	0	2	0	0	3	0	0	2	0	1	8

Sheet B	1	2	3	4	5	6	7	8	9	10	Final
France (Dufour)	0	0	0	0	0	3	0	3	1	X	7
China (Wang)	0	0	0	1	0	0	1	0	0	X	2

Sheet C	1	2	3	4	5	6	7	8	9	10	Final
Germany (Kapp)	0	2	0	2	0	2	3	0	0	0	9
Switzerland (Pescia)	1	0	2	0	1	0	0	0	3	1	8

Sheet D	1	2	3	4	5	6	7	8	9	10	Final
Czech Republic (J. Snítil)	1	0	2	2	0	1	0	1	0	X	7
Scotland (Murdoch)	0	1	0	0	1	0	1	0	2	X	5

=== Draw 2 ===
April 5, 19:00

Sheet A	1	2	3	4	5	6	7	8	9	10	Final
Switzerland (Pescia)	0	0	0	0	0	0	0	1	X	X	1
France (Dufour)	0	0	1	4	1	0	1	0	X	X	7

Sheet B	1	2	3	4	5	6	7	8	9	10	Final
Sweden (Kraupp)	0	0	0	1	0	0	2	1	0	2	6
Australia (Millikin)	1	0	0	0	1	0	0	0	3	0	5

Sheet C	1	2	3	4	5	6	7	8	9	10	Final
Denmark (Frederiksen)	0	0	1	1	0	1	0	0	0	X	3
Canada (Martin)	3	1	0	0	1	0	0	3	1	X	9

Sheet D	1	2	3	4	5	6	7	8	9	10	Final
Germany (Kapp)	2	0	1	1	3	0	2	1	1	X	11
China (Wang)	0	2	0	0	0	3	0	0	0	X	5

=== Draw 3 ===
April 6, 09:00

Sheet B	1	2	3	4	5	6	7	8	9	10	Final
Scotland (Murdoch)	4	0	1	0	2	0	0	2	1	X	10
Norway (Ulsrud)	0	2	0	2	0	1	1	0	0	X	6

Sheet C	1	2	3	4	5	6	7	8	9	10	Final
Czech Republic (J. Snítil)	1	0	2	2	1	0	1	0	0	0	7
United States (Brown)	0	1	0	0	0	1	0	2	0	2	6

=== Draw 4 ===
April 6, 14:00

Sheet A	1	2	3	4	5	6	7	8	9	10	Final
Australia (Millikin)	4	0	2	1	0	1	0	0	2	X	10
Denmark (Frederiksen)	0	3	0	0	1	0	2	1	0	X	7

Sheet B	1	2	3	4	5	6	7	8	9	10	Final
China (Wang)	2	0	1	0	1	1	0	1	0	1	7
Switzerland (Pescia)	0	1	0	3	0	0	1	0	0	0	5

Sheet C	1	2	3	4	5	6	7	8	9	10	Final
France (Dufour)	0	0	0	1	0	3	0	1	0	0	5
Germany (Kapp)	0	1	0	0	2	0	3	0	1	1	8

Sheet D	1	2	3	4	5	6	7	8	9	10	Final
Sweden (Kraupp)	1	1	0	0	1	0	1	0	1	0	5
Canada (Martin)	0	0	1	0	0	3	0	2	0	2	8

=== Draw 5 ===
April 6, 19:00

Sheet A	1	2	3	4	5	6	7	8	9	10	Final
United States (Brown)	1	0	1	0	0	2	0	0	1	2	7
Scotland (Murdoch)	0	2	0	0	2	0	0	2	0	0	6

Sheet B	1	2	3	4	5	6	7	8	9	10	Final
Denmark (Frederiksen)	2	0	2	0	0	3	1	0	1	X	9
Sweden (Kraupp)	0	1	0	2	0	0	0	2	0	X	5

Sheet C	1	2	3	4	5	6	7	8	9	10	Final
Canada (Martin)	2	0	2	0	0	3	2	0	X	X	9
Australia (Millikin)	0	1	0	1	0	0	0	1	X	X	3

Sheet D	1	2	3	4	5	6	7	8	9	10	Final
Norway (Ulsrud)	3	1	0	2	1	0	1	0	X	X	8
Czech Republic (J. Snítil)	0	0	2	0	0	1	0	1	X	X	4

=== Draw 6 ===
April 7, 09:00

Sheet A	1	2	3	4	5	6	7	8	9	10	Final
Czech Republic (J. Snítil)	0	1	0	1	0	3	0	0	1	1	7
Germany (Kapp)	1	0	1	0	5	0	2	0	0	0	9

Sheet B	1	2	3	4	5	6	7	8	9	10	Final
Scotland (Murdoch)	0	0	2	1	0	0	1	0	0	1	5
France (Dufour)	2	1	0	0	0	0	0	1	0	0	4

Sheet C	1	2	3	4	5	6	7	8	9	10	Final
Norway (Ulsrud)	0	2	0	0	3	0	0	2	0	2	9
Switzerland (Pescia)	1	0	2	1	0	2	0	0	2	0	8

Sheet D	1	2	3	4	5	6	7	8	9	10	11	Final
United States (Brown)	0	1	0	2	2	3	0	0	0	0	1	9
China (Wang)	2	0	1	0	0	0	1	3	0	1	0	8

=== Draw 7 ===
April 7, 14:00

Sheet A	1	2	3	4	5	6	7	8	9	10	Final
France (Dufour)	0	0	1	0	0	1	X	X	X	X	2
Canada (Martin)	2	3	0	2	1	0	X	X	X	X	8

Sheet B	1	2	3	4	5	6	7	8	9	10	Final
Germany (Kapp)	0	0	1	0	0	1	0	0	1	0	3
Australia (Millikin)	0	0	0	0	2	0	2	0	0	1	5

Sheet C	1	2	3	4	5	6	7	8	9	10	Final
China (Wang)	0	0	1	0	3	0	1	0	3	X	8
Denmark (Frederiksen)	0	1	0	1	0	2	0	1	0	X	5

Sheet D	1	2	3	4	5	6	7	8	9	10	Final
Switzerland (Pescia)	0	0	0	2	1	0	1	0	0	1	5
Sweden (Kraupp)	0	1	0	0	0	1	0	0	2	0	4

=== Draw 8 ===
April 7, 19:00

Sheet A	1	2	3	4	5	6	7	8	9	10	11	Final
Sweden (Kraupp)	0	2	0	0	0	1	0	1	0	1	0	5
Norway (Ulsrud)	1	0	3	0	0	0	1	0	0	0	2	7

Sheet B	1	2	3	4	5	6	7	8	9	10	Final
Denmark (Frederiksen)	0	2	1	0	1	0	0	1	1	1	7
United States (Brown)	3	0	0	1	0	1	1	0	0	0	6

Sheet C	1	2	3	4	5	6	7	8	9	10	Final
Australia (Millikin)	0	0	0	2	1	0	3	0	1	1	8
Czech Republic (J. Snítil)	0	0	1	0	0	1	0	3	0	0	5

Sheet D	1	2	3	4	5	6	7	8	9	10	Final
Canada (Martin)	0	0	1	0	2	0	1	1	0	1	6
Scotland (Murdoch)	1	0	0	2	0	0	0	0	2	0	5

=== Draw 9 ===
April 8, 09:00

Sheet A	1	2	3	4	5	6	7	8	9	10	Final
Australia (Millikin)	0	2	1	0	1	1	0	1	0	X	6
United States (Brown)	0	0	0	1	0	0	2	0	1	X	4

Sheet B	1	2	3	4	5	6	7	8	9	10	11	Final
Canada (Martin)	1	0	0	2	0	0	4	0	1	0	1	9
Norway (Ulsrud)	0	2	1	0	2	0	0	1	0	2	0	8

Sheet C	1	2	3	4	5	6	7	8	9	10	Final
Sweden (Kraupp)	0	0	0	3	0	3	0	1	0	X	7
Scotland (Murdoch)	2	2	0	0	1	0	2	0	4	X	11

Sheet D	1	2	3	4	5	6	7	8	9	10	Final
Denmark (Frederiksen)	0	1	1	0	0	4	0	1	0	1	8
Czech Republic (J. Snítil)	2	0	0	1	1	0	1	0	2	0	7

=== Draw 10 ===
April 8, 14:00

Sheet A	1	2	3	4	5	6	7	8	9	10	Final
Scotland (Murdoch)	1	1	0	0	2	0	0	2	2	x	8
China (Wang)	0	0	1	0	0	0	1	0	0	x	2

Sheet B	1	2	3	4	5	6	7	8	9	10	Final
Czech Republic (J. Snítil)	1	0	2	0	1	0	2	0	1	0	7
Switzerland (Pescia)	0	2	0	2	0	2	0	1	0	1	8

Sheet C	1	2	3	4	5	6	7	8	9	10	Final
United States (Brown)	0	0	1	0	0	0	2	0	2	0	5
France (Dufour)	0	0	0	2	0	2	0	1	0	1	6

Sheet D	1	2	3	4	5	6	7	8	9	10	Final
Norway (Ulsrud)	1	2	0	0	0	2	0	1	0	1	7
Germany (Kapp)	0	0	1	2	1	0	1	0	1	0	6

=== Draw 11 ===
April 8, 19:00

Sheet A	1	2	3	4	5	6	7	8	9	10	Final
Switzerland (Pescia)	0	1	0	0	0	2	0	1	0	X	4
Denmark (Frederiksen)	1	0	2	2	0	0	1	0	1	X	7

Sheet B	1	2	3	4	5	6	7	8	9	10	Final
Germany (Kapp)	0	1	0	0	1	0	0	2	0	X	4
Canada (Martin)	3	0	2	0	0	2	0	0	2	X	9

Sheet C	1	2	3	4	5	6	7	8	9	10	Final
China (Wang)	2	1	0	0	2	0	3	X	X	X	8
Sweden (Kraupp)	0	0	0	1	0	1	0	X	X	X	2

Sheet D	1	2	3	4	5	6	7	8	9	10	Final
France (Dufour)	0	1	0	0	0	1	0	1	2	1	6
Australia (Millikin)	1	0	0	0	1	0	2	0	0	0	4

=== Draw 12 ===
April 9, 09:00

Sheet A	1	2	3	4	5	6	7	8	9	10	Final
Germany (Kapp)	1	0	1	0	0	0	2	1	0	0	5
Sweden (Kraupp)	0	0	0	1	0	0	0	0	2	3	6

Sheet B	1	2	3	4	5	6	7	8	9	10	Final
France (Dufour)	0	1	0	1	1	0	2	0	2	X	7
Denmark (Frederiksen)	0	0	2	0	0	1	0	1	0	X	4

Sheet C	1	2	3	4	5	6	7	8	9	10	Final
Switzerland (Pescia)	2	0	2	0	1	0	0	1	0	X	6
Australia (Millikin)	0	1	0	2	0	2	2	0	0	X	7

Sheet D	1	2	3	4	5	6	7	8	9	10	11	Final
China (Wang)	0	1	1	0	1	1	0	0	0	1	1	6
Canada (Martin)	3	0	0	1	0	0	0	1	0	0	0	5

=== Draw 13 ===
April 9, 14:00

Sheet A	1	2	3	4	5	6	7	8	9	10	Final
Canada (Martin)	1	2	1	1	1	0	X	X	X	X	6
Czech Republic (J. Snítil)	0	0	0	0	0	1	X	X	X	X	1

Sheet B	1	2	3	4	5	6	7	8	9	10	Final
Australia (Millikin)	0	0	1	0	1	0	0	0	2	0	4
Scotland (Murdoch)	1	0	0	2	0	0	0	2	0	1	6

Sheet C	1	2	3	4	5	6	7	8	9	10	Final
Denmark (Frederiksen)	0	0	0	0	2	0	1	0	0	X	3
Norway (Ulsrud)	0	1	3	1	0	1	0	0	1	X	7

Sheet D	1	2	3	4	5	6	7	8	9	10	Final
Sweden (Kraupp)	0	0	1	0	2	0	2	0	1	0	6
United States (Brown)	0	2	0	3	0	1	0	1	0	1	8

=== Draw 14 ===
April 9, 19:00

Sheet A	1	2	3	4	5	6	7	8	9	10	Final
Norway (Ulsrud)	1	0	1	1	0	0	3	0	0	X	6
France (Dufour)	0	1	0	0	1	1	0	0	1	X	4

Sheet B	1	2	3	4	5	6	7	8	9	10	Final
United States (Brown)	0	0	2	2	0	2	0	2	0	X	8
Germany (Kapp)	0	1	0	0	1	0	1	0	2	X	5

Sheet C	1	2	3	4	5	6	7	8	9	10	Final
Czech Republic (J. Snítil)	0	1	0	1	0	0	0	0	1	X	3
China (Wang)	0	0	2	0	3	0	0	2	0	X	7

Sheet D	1	2	3	4	5	6	7	8	9	10	Final
Scotland (Murdoch)	1	0	3	0	0	2	0	0	0	X	6
Switzerland (Pescia)	0	1	0	2	1	0	0	0	0	X	4

=== Draw 15 ===
April 10, 09:00

Sheet A	1	2	3	4	5	6	7	8	9	10	Final
China (Wang)	1	0	0	1	0	0	0	0	2	1	5
Australia (Millikin)	0	0	1	0	0	1	0	1	0	0	3

Sheet B	1	2	3	4	5	6	7	8	9	10	Final
Switzerland (Pescia)	0	2	0	0	0	3	0	0	1	0	6
Canada (Martin)	2	0	2	1	0	0	1	1	0	1	8

Sheet C	1	2	3	4	5	6	7	8	9	10	Final
France (Dufour)	0	1	0	1	0	1	1	0	1	X	5
Sweden (Kraupp)	0	0	4	0	1	0	0	2	0	X	7

Sheet D	1	2	3	4	5	6	7	8	9	10	11	Final
Germany (Kapp)	1	0	1	3	0	0	0	1	1	0	3	10
Denmark (Frederiksen)	0	1	0	0	1	1	3	0	0	1	0	7

=== Draw 16 ===
April 10, 14:00

Sheet A	1	2	3	4	5	6	7	8	9	10	Final
United States (Brown)	2	0	2	0	0	0	2	0	1	0	7
Switzerland (Pescia)	0	1	0	2	1	2	0	1	0	1	8

Sheet B	1	2	3	4	5	6	7	8	9	10	11	Final
Norway (Ulsrud)	1	0	1	0	1	1	0	2	0	1	0	7
China (Wang)	0	1	0	3	0	0	1	0	2	0	1	8

Sheet C	1	2	3	4	5	6	7	8	9	10	Final
Scotland (Murdoch)	1	0	1	0	0	0	0	2	1	X	5
Germany (Kapp)	0	1	0	0	2	0	0	0	0	X	3

Sheet D	1	2	3	4	5	6	7	8	9	10	Final
Czech Republic (J. Snítil)	0	1	0	0	1	0	0	1	0	X	3
France (Dufour)	1	0	0	1	0	0	4	0	4	X	10

=== Draw 17 ===
April 10, 19:00

Sheet A	1	2	3	4	5	6	7	8	9	10	Final
Denmark (Frederiksen)	0	0	0	2	0	1	0	1	0	X	4
Scotland (Murdoch)	2	0	1	0	1	0	1	0	2	X	7

Sheet B	1	2	3	4	5	6	7	8	9	10	Final
Sweden (Kraupp)	0	1	0	0	2	2	0	0	0	3	8
Czech Republic (J. Snítil)	2	0	1	1	0	0	0	1	1	0	6

Sheet C	1	2	3	4	5	6	7	8	9	10	Final
Canada (Martin)	3	0	2	0	2	0	0	3	X	X	10
United States (Brown)	0	2	0	1	0	1	0	0	X	X	4

Sheet D	1	2	3	4	5	6	7	8	9	10	11	Final
Australia (Millikin)	0	1	0	1	0	1	0	3	1	0	0	7
Norway (Ulsrud)	2	0	1	0	1	0	1	0	0	2	2	9

== Playoffs ==
Page playoff system
1	Canada	6
2	Scotland	7
3	China	5
4	Norway	7

Semifinal
1	Canada	5
4	Norway	4

Gold medal game
2	Scotland	3
1	Canada	6

Bronze medal game
3	China	3
4	Norway	8

=== 3 vs 4 ===
Sheet B	1	2	3	4	5	6	7	8	9	10	Final
China (Wang)	2	0	1	0	1	0	1	0	0	X	5
Norway (Ulsrud)	0	3	0	2	0	2	0	0	0	X	7

Player percentages
China		Norway	
Zang Jialiang	91%	Havard Vad Petersson	82%
Xu Xiaoming	76%	Christoffer Svae	96%
Wang Fengchun	80%	Torger Nergård	90%
Liu Rui	78%	Thomas Ulsrud	96%
Total	81%	Total	91%

=== 1 vs 2 ===
Sheet B	1	2	3	4	5	6	7	8	9	10	Final
Scotland (Murdoch)	0	0	2	0	0	2	1	0	1	1	7
Canada (Martin)	0	3	0	3	0	0	0	0	0	0	6

Player percentages
Scotland		Canada	
Euan Byers	96%	Ben Hebert	99%
Peter Smith	78%	Marc Kennedy	88%
Graeme Connal	86%	John Morris	91%
David Murdoch	80%	Kevin Martin	74%
Total	85%	Total	88%

=== Semifinal ===
Sheet C	1	2	3	4	5	6	7	8	9	10	Final
Canada (Martin)	2	0	2	0	0	0	0	1	0	0	5
Norway (Ulsrud)	0	1	0	0	0	0	1	0	1	1	4

Player percentages
Norway		Canada	
Havard Vad Petersson	99%	Ben Hebert	92%
Christoffer Svae	80%	Marc Kennedy	95%
Torger Nergård	84%	John Morris	91%
Thomas Ulsrud	88%	Kevin Martin	94%
Total	88%	Total	93%

=== Bronze medal game ===
Sheet B	1	2	3	4	5	6	7	8	9	10	Final
China (Wang)	0	0	0	0	2	0	0	1	0	X	3
Norway (Ulsrud)	2	0	0	0	0	3	2	0	1	X	8

Player percentages
China		Norway	
Zang Jialiang	92%	Havard Vad Petersson	90%
Xu Xiaoming	85%	Christoffer Svae	89%
Wang Fengchun	85%	Torger Nergård	88%
Liu Rui	68%	Thomas Ulsrud	89%
Total	82%	Total	89%

=== Gold medal game ===
Sheet B	1	2	3	4	5	6	7	8	9	10	Final
Canada (Martin)	0	1	0	0	2	1	0	0	2	X	6
Scotland (Murdoch)	0	0	1	0	0	0	0	2	0	X	3

Player percentages
Canada		Scotland	
Ben Hebert	85%	Euan Byers	95%
Marc Kennedy	95%	Peter Smith	78%
John Morris	95%	Graeme Connal	85%
Kevin Martin	89%	David Murdoch	78%
Total	91%	Total	85%

2008 Ford Men's World Curling Championship Winners
(Canada)
Canada
31st title

== Player percentages ==
Top five percentages per position during the round robin.

Leads	%	Seconds	%	Thirds	%	Skips	%
(Norway) Havard Vad Petersson	88	(Canada) Marc Kennedy	86	(Canada) John Morris	90	(Canada) Kevin Martin	87
(Canada) Ben Hebert	87	(Scotland) Peter Smith	84	(Scotland) Graeme Connal	86	(Scotland) David Murdoch	82
(China) Zang Jialiang	86	(Norway) Christoffer Svae	84	(China) Liu Rui	83	(Norway) Thomas Ulsrud	80
(Scotland) Euan Byers	86	(Australia) Sean Hall	82	(Norway) Torger Nergård	83	(Germany) Andy Kapp	80
(United States) Peter Annis	86	(Germany) Holger Höhne	81	(United States) Richard Ruohonen	83	(France) Thomas Dufour	78

== See also ==
- 2008 Brier
- 2008 World Junior Curling Championships
- 2008 World Mixed Doubles Curling Championship
- 2008 Ford World Women's Curling Championship
- 2008 Scotties Tournament of Hearts
