= Oslo Cup (curling) =

- Established: 2000
- Host city: Bærum, Norway
- Arena: Snarøya Curling Club
- Men's purse: NOK 81,000
- Women's purse: NOK 77,000

Current champions (2026)
- Men: (Sweden) Oskar Eriksson
- Women: (Sweden) Isabella Wranå

Current edition
- 2025 Oslo Cup

The Oslo Cup (formerly the Norway Cup, the Radisson SAS Oslo Cup, the Weber Oslo Cup and the Radisson Blu Oslo Cup) is an annual curling tournament, held in September in Bærum, a suburb of Oslo. It is one of the events on the Nordic Curling Tour. From 2000 to 2012 it was one of the first curling tournaments of the World Curling Tour season. After the 2012 edition, the event was put on hiatus for ten years before returning in 2022.

== Past champions ==
=== Men ===
Year	Winning skip	Runner-up skip	Purse (kr)
2000	(Norway) Pål Trulsen		
2001	(Norway) Pål Trulsen	(Sweden) Emil Marklund	
2002	(Canada) Paul Gowsell (Note: Gowsell was skipping in place of Kevin Martin on his team.)	(Norway) Thomas Ulsrud	$30,000
2003	(Sweden) Peja Lindholm	(Scotland) David Murdoch	$30,000
2004	(Norway) Pål Trulsen	(Switzerland) Ralph Stöckli	$30,000
2005	(Sweden) Nils Carlsén	(Switzerland) Ralph Stöckli	148,000
2006	(Norway) Pål Trulsen	(Norway) Thomas Ulsrud	$27,500
2007	(Canada) Kevin Koe	(Norway) Pål Trulsen	90,000
2008	(Norway) Thomas Ulsrud	(Canada) Kevin Martin	160,000
2009	(Sweden) Oskar Eriksson	(Norway) Thomas Ulsrud	160,000
2010	(Sweden) Niklas Edin	(Norway) Thomas Ulsrud	160,000
2011	(Sweden) Niklas Edin	(Scotland) Tom Brewster	160,000
2012	(Sweden) Niklas Edin	(Finland) Markku Uusipaavalniemi	160,000
Not held between 2013 and 2021
2022	(Sweden) Niklas Edin	(Norway) Steffen Walstad	112,000
2023	(Switzerland) Marco Hösli	(Switzerland) Yannick Schwaller	112,000
2024	(Switzerland) Marco Hösli	(Sweden) Niklas Edin	112,000
2025	(United States) Chris Plys	(Sweden) Niklas Edin	112,000
2026	(Sweden) Oskar Eriksson	(Norway) Lukas Høstmælingen	81,000

=== Women ===
Year	Winning skip	Runner-up skip	Purse (kr)
2004	(Sweden) Anette Norberg		
2005	(Canada) Sherry Middaugh	(Switzerland) Silvana Tirinzoni	
2006	(Sweden) Anette Norberg	(Switzerland) Silvana Tirinzoni	$16,150
2007	(Canada) Jennifer Jones	(Canada) Sherry Anderson	90,000
2008	(Scotland) Kelly Wood	(Sweden) Anette Norberg	100,000
2009	(Canada) Jennifer Jones	(Sweden) Anette Norberg	100,000
2010	(Switzerland) Mirjam Ott	(Sweden) Anna Hasselborg	100,000
2011	(Canada) Jennifer Jones	(Sweden) Margaretha Sigfridsson	100,000
2012	(Canada) Sherry Middaugh	(Sweden) Margaretha Sigfridsson	100,000
Not held between 2013 and 2021
2022	(Sweden) Anna Hasselborg	(Canada) Kaitlyn Lawes	88,000
2023	(Sweden) Anna Hasselborg	(Norway) Marianne Rørvik	88,000
2024	(Sweden) Anna Hasselborg	(Switzerland) Xenia Schwaller	88,000
2025	(Switzerland) Xenia Schwaller	(Norway) Torild Bjørnstad	78,000
2026	(Sweden) Isabella Wranå	(Norway) Torild Bjørnstad	77,000
