= Björn Brandberg =

Swedish male curler

- Curler ♂
- Born: 26 March 1986 (age 40)

Team
- Curling club: Stocksunds CK, Stockholm

Curling career
- Member Association: Sweden
- World Championship: 1 (2008)
Medal record
Curling

Björn Olof Gustaf Brandberg (born 26 March 1986) is a Swedish curler.

He played for Sweden in the 2008 World men's championship.

== Teams ==
| Season | Skip | Third | Second | Lead | Alternate | Coach | Events |
|---|---|---|---|---|---|---|---|
| 2005–06 | Björn Brandberg | Olof Esbjoernsson | Peder Folke | Axel Ostersund | | | |
| 2007–08 | Anders Kraupp | Peder Folke | Björn Brandberg | Anton Sandström | Mats Nyberg | Stefan Hasselborg | WCC 2008 (10th) |
