= Curling at the 2015 Winter Universiade =

- Host city: Granada, Spain
- Arena: Pabellón de Universiada
- Dates: February 5–13
- Men's winner: Norway
- Curling club: University of Oslo, Oslo
- Skip: Steffen Walstad
- Third: Eirik Mjøen
- Second: Magnus Nedregotten
- Lead: Sander Rølvåg
- Finalist: Russia (Evgeniy Arkhipov)
- Women's winner: Russia
- Curling club: Lesgaft University, St. Petersburg
- Skip: Anna Sidorova
- Third: Margarita Fomina
- Second: Alexandra Saitova
- Lead: Ekaterina Galkina
- Alternate: Victoria Moiseeva
- Finalist: Canada (Breanne Meakin)

Curling at the 2015 Winter Universiade was held from February 5 to 13 at the Pabellón de Universiada in Granada, Spain.

== Medal summary ==
=== Medal table ===
Rank	Nation	Gold	Silver	Bronze	Total
1	Russia (RUS)	1	1	0	2
2	Norway (NOR)	1	0	0	1
3	Canada (CAN)	0	1	0	1
4	Great Britain (GBR)	0	0	1	1
4	Switzerland (SUI)	0	0	1	1
Totals (5 entries)		2	2	2	6

=== Medalists ===
Event	Gold	Silver	Bronze
Men	Norway (NOR); Steffen Walstad; Eirik Mjøen; Magnus Nedregotten; Sander Rølvåg	Russia (RUS); Evgeniy Arkhipov; Alexey Stukalskiy; Artur Razhabov; Anton Kalalb; Andrey Drozdov	Great Britain (GBR); Kyle Smith; Grant Hardie; Thomas Muirhead; Alasdair Schreiber; Stuart Taylor
Women	Russia (RUS); Anna Sidorova; Margarita Fomina; Alexandra Saitova; Ekaterina Galkina; Viktoriia Moiseeva	Canada (CAN); Breanne Meakin; Lauren Horton; Lynn Kreviazuk; Jessica Armstrong	Switzerland (SUI); Michèle Jäggi; Michelle Gribi; Sina Wettstein; Nora Baumann; Anita Jäggi

== Men ==
=== Teams ===
Canada	Czech Republic	Great Britain	Japan	Norway
Skip: Matt Dunstone; Third: James Coleman; Second: Daniel Grant; Lead: Christopher Gallant	Fourth: Jakub Splavec; Skip: Kryštof Chaloupek; Second: Martin Jurík; Lead: Jan Sedlář; Alternate: Tomáš Zelenka	Skip: Kyle Smith; Third: Grant Hardie; Second: Thomas Muirhead; Lead: Alasdair Schreiber; Alternate: Stuart Taylor	Skip: Yasumasa Tanida; Third: Yuya Takigahira; Second: Shingo Usui; Lead: Kazuki Yoshikawa; Alternate: Kohsuke Hirata	Skip: Steffen Walstad; Third: Eirik Mjøen; Second: Magnus Nedregotten; Lead: Sander Rølvåg
Russia	Spain	Sweden	Switzerland	United States
Skip: Evgeniy Arkhipov; Third: Alexey Stukalskiy; Second: Artur Razhabov; Lead: Anton Kalalb; Alternate: Andrey Drozdov	Skip: Sergio Vez; Third: Angel García; Second: Eduardo de Paz; Lead: Luis Domingo; Alternate: Mario Fernández	Fourth: Patric Mabergs; Skip: Gustav Eskilsson; Second: Jesper Johanson; Lead: Johannes Patz	Fourth: Roger Gulka; Skip: Kim-Lloyd Sciboz; Second: Daniel Schifferli; Lead: Rene Iseli; Alternate: Nicolas Desbaillets	Skip: Stephen Dropkin; Third: Blake Morton; Second: Kyle Kakela; Lead: Evan Jensen; Alternate: Calvin Weber

=== Round-robin standings ===
Final round-robin standings

Key
Teams to Playoffs

Country	Skip	W	L
Norway	Steffen Walstad	7	2
Russia	Evgeniy Arkhipov	7	2
Great Britain	Kyle Smith	6	3
Sweden	Patric Mabergs	6	3
Canada	Matt Dunstone	5	4
Czech Republic	Kryštof Chaloupek	3	6
Japan	Yasumasa Tanida	3	6
United States	Stephen Dropkin	3	6
Switzerland	Kim-Lloyd Sciboz	3	6
Spain	Sergio Vez	2	7

=== Round-robin results ===
==== Draw 1 ====
Thursday, February 5, 14:00

Sheet A	1	2	3	4	5	6	7	8	9	10	Final
Spain (Vez) 🔨	1	0	0	0	1	1	0	0	0	X	3
Japan (Tanida)	0	0	2	2	0	0	2	2	5	X	13

Sheet B	1	2	3	4	5	6	7	8	9	10	Final
United States (Dropkin) 🔨	1	1	0	0	1	1	0	1	0	1	6
Canada (Dunstone)	0	0	4	0	0	0	1	0	0	0	5

Sheet C	1	2	3	4	5	6	7	8	9	10	Final
Russia (Arkhipov) 🔨	1	0	0	3	3	2	0	3	X	X	12
Sweden (Mabergs)	0	1	3	0	0	0	2	0	X	X	6

Sheet D	1	2	3	4	5	6	7	8	9	10	11	Final
Great Britain (Smith)	0	1	0	2	1	0	1	0	0	0	0	5
Czech Republic (Chaloupek) 🔨	2	0	1	0	0	0	0	0	1	1	1	6

Sheet E	1	2	3	4	5	6	7	8	9	10	Final
Norway (Walstad) 🔨	2	0	0	0	0	1	1	2	0	X	6
Switzerland (Sciboz)	0	0	0	1	0	0	0	0	2	X	3

==== Draw 2 ====
Friday, February 6, 9:00

Sheet A	1	2	3	4	5	6	7	8	9	10	Final
Canada (Dunstone) 🔨	0	0	1	0	2	0	0	1	0	X	4
Great Britain (Smith)	1	1	0	3	0	1	0	0	1	X	7

Sheet B	1	2	3	4	5	6	7	8	9	10	Final
Japan (Tanida) 🔨	2	0	0	0	0	1	0	1	0	X	4
Czech Republic (Chaloupek)	0	2	0	2	1	0	1	0	3	X	9

Sheet C	1	2	3	4	5	6	7	8	9	10	Final
Norway (Walstad) 🔨	2	3	0	1	0	4	X	X	X	X	10
Spain (Vez)	0	0	1	0	2	0	X	X	X	X	3

Sheet D	1	2	3	4	5	6	7	8	9	10	Final
Switzerland (Sciboz) 🔨	1	0	3	0	0	1	0	1	1	0	7
Sweden (Mabergs)	0	3	0	2	1	0	2	0	0	1	9

Sheet E	1	2	3	4	5	6	7	8	9	10	Final
United States (Dropkin)	0	0	1	0	1	0	0	X	X	X	2
Russia (Arkhipov) 🔨	0	2	0	2	0	2	3	X	X	X	9

==== Draw 3 ====
Friday, February 6, 19:00

Sheet A	1	2	3	4	5	6	7	8	9	10	Final
Sweden (Mabergs)	0	0	1	1	0	2	0	0	0	1	5
United States (Dropkin) 🔨	0	1	0	0	1	0	1	0	1	0	4

Sheet B	1	2	3	4	5	6	7	8	9	10	Final
Spain (Vez) 🔨	3	2	0	2	0	3	0	1	1	X	12
Switzerland (Sciboz)	0	0	1	0	3	0	2	0	0	X	6

Sheet C	1	2	3	4	5	6	7	8	9	10	11	Final
Japan (Tanida)	0	1	1	0	1	0	0	0	2	1	0	6
Great Britain (Smith) 🔨	1	0	0	2	0	2	0	1	0	0	1	7

Sheet D	1	2	3	4	5	6	7	8	9	10	Final
Russia (Arkhipov)	0	2	0	0	1	0	0	0	X	X	3
Norway (Walstad) 🔨	2	0	3	0	0	1	1	1	X	X	8

Sheet E	1	2	3	4	5	6	7	8	9	10	Final
Canada (Dunstone)	1	2	0	0	0	3	0	1	1	X	8
Czech Republic (Chaloupek) 🔨	0	0	0	1	0	0	1	0	0	X	2

==== Draw 4 ====
Saturday, February 7, 14:00

Sheet A	1	2	3	4	5	6	7	8	9	10	Final
Czech Republic (Chaloupek) 🔨	0	1	0	0	0	1	0	0	2	X	4
Norway (Walstad)	0	0	3	0	1	0	2	0	0	X	6

Sheet B	1	2	3	4	5	6	7	8	9	10	Final
Russia (Arkhipov) 🔨	2	0	1	0	0	0	0	0	0	1	4
Great Britain (Smith)	0	1	0	0	0	0	1	0	1	0	3

Sheet C	1	2	3	4	5	6	7	8	9	10	Final
Switzerland (Sciboz)	0	3	0	1	0	1	0	0	2	1	8
Canada (Dunstone) 🔨	2	0	2	0	1	0	0	1	0	0	6

Sheet D	1	2	3	4	5	6	7	8	9	10	Final
Sweden (Mabergs) 🔨	1	0	0	2	0	2	1	0	1	X	7
Spain (Vez)	0	1	0	0	0	0	0	1	0	X	2

Sheet E	1	2	3	4	5	6	7	8	9	10	Final
Japan (Tanida) 🔨	0	2	0	1	2	0	0	1	0	1	7
United States (Dropkin)	0	0	1	0	0	4	0	0	1	0	6

==== Draw 5 ====
Sunday, February 8, 9:00

Sheet A	1	2	3	4	5	6	7	8	9	10	Final
Russia (Arkhipov)	0	0	0	0	1	2	0	2	0	0	5
Canada (Dunstone) 🔨	0	2	1	1	0	0	1	0	2	2	9

Sheet B	1	2	3	4	5	6	7	8	9	10	Final
Norway (Walstad) 🔨	0	0	1	1	0	1	0	1	0	1	5
Japan (Tanida)	0	1	0	0	0	0	1	0	1	0	3

Sheet C	1	2	3	4	5	6	7	8	9	10	Final
Spain (Vez)	0	0	2	0	0	2	0	1	0	2	7
Czech Republic (Chaloupek) 🔨	1	1	0	1	0	0	1	0	2	0	6

Sheet D	1	2	3	4	5	6	7	8	9	10	Final
United States (Dropkin) 🔨	0	2	0	1	1	0	0	3	0	0	7
Switzerland (Sciboz)	3	0	0	0	0	0	2	0	1	2	8

Sheet E	1	2	3	4	5	6	7	8	9	10	Final
Great Britain (Smith) 🔨	1	0	1	0	1	1	3	0	0	2	9
Sweden (Mabergs)	0	3	0	1	0	0	0	1	1	0	6

==== Draw 6 ====
Sunday, February 8, 19:00

Sheet A	1	2	3	4	5	6	7	8	9	10	Final
Norway (Walstad) 🔨	1	3	0	0	1	0	0	0	1	X	6
Sweden (Mabergs)	0	0	0	1	0	1	2	0	0	X	4

Sheet B	1	2	3	4	5	6	7	8	9	10	Final
Canada (Dunstone) 🔨	2	0	3	0	0	0	6	X	X	X	11
Spain (Vez)	0	1	0	0	0	1	0	X	X	X	2

Sheet C	1	2	3	4	5	6	7	8	9	10	Final
Great Britain (Smith) 🔨	0	0	1	1	1	0	1	0	0	1	5
United States (Dropkin)	0	1	0	0	0	1	0	2	0	0	4

Sheet D	1	2	3	4	5	6	7	8	9	10	Final
Czech Republic (Chaloupek)	0	0	0	0	0	0	2	1	0	X	3
Russia (Arkhipov) 🔨	0	2	1	3	1	0	0	0	3	X	10

Sheet E	1	2	3	4	5	6	7	8	9	10	Final
Switzerland (Sciboz)	0	0	0	1	0	0	0	1	0	X	2
Japan (Tanida) 🔨	0	0	0	0	3	1	1	0	2	X	7

==== Draw 7 ====
Monday, February 9, 14:00

Sheet A	1	2	3	4	5	6	7	8	9	10	Final
United States (Dropkin)	0	1	0	1	0	2	0	2	0	X	6
Czech Republic (Chaloupek) 🔨	2	0	2	0	1	0	2	0	1	X	8

Sheet B	1	2	3	4	5	6	7	8	9	10	Final
Switzerland (Sciboz) 🔨	0	1	0	0	0	2	0	2	0	X	5
Russia (Arkhipov)	0	0	3	2	0	0	1	0	2	X	8

Sheet C	1	2	3	4	5	6	7	8	9	10	11	Final
Sweden (Mabergs)	0	0	0	0	1	2	0	0	2	0	1	6
Japan (Tanida) 🔨	1	0	0	1	0	0	0	1	0	2	0	5

Sheet D	1	2	3	4	5	6	7	8	9	10	Final
Norway (Walstad) 🔨	1	0	1	0	1	0	2	0	2	X	7
Canada (Dunstone)	0	2	0	2	0	2	0	3	0	X	9

Sheet E	1	2	3	4	5	6	7	8	9	10	Final
Spain (Vez)	0	1	0	0	1	0	1	0	0	0	3
Great Britain (Smith) 🔨	1	0	1	0	0	1	0	0	0	1	4

==== Draw 8 ====
Tuesday, February 10, 9:00

Sheet A	1	2	3	4	5	6	7	8	9	10	Final
Japan (Tanida) 🔨	1	0	0	1	0	0	2	0	X	X	4
Russia (Arkhipov)	0	2	0	0	3	2	0	3	X	X	10

Sheet B	1	2	3	4	5	6	7	8	9	10	Final
Great Britain (Smith) 🔨	0	2	0	0	1	0	0	1	0	X	4
Norway (Walstad)	0	0	0	2	0	1	0	0	3	X	6

Sheet C	1	2	3	4	5	6	7	8	9	10	Final
Czech Republic (Chaloupek) 🔨	2	0	0	2	0	0	2	0	0	1	7
Switzerland (Sciboz)	0	2	1	0	4	1	0	1	0	0	9

Sheet D	1	2	3	4	5	6	7	8	9	10	Final
Spain (Vez)	0	2	1	0	0	0	0	0	X	X	3
United States (Dropkin) 🔨	0	0	0	2	2	2	1	4	X	X	11

Sheet E	1	2	3	4	5	6	7	8	9	10	Final
Sweden (Mabergs) 🔨	2	0	0	3	0	2	0	3	X	X	10
Canada (Dunstone)	0	1	0	0	1	0	1	0	X	X	3

==== Draw 9 ====
Tuesday, February 10, 19:00

Sheet A	1	2	3	4	5	6	7	8	9	10	Final
Great Britain (Smith)	1	0	0	2	2	0	0	3	1	X	9
Switzerland (Sciboz) 🔨	0	1	1	0	0	0	2	0	0	X	4

Sheet B	1	2	3	4	5	6	7	8	9	10	Final
Czech Republic (Chaloupek) 🔨	0	1	0	2	0	0	X	X	X	X	3
Sweden (Mabergs)	3	0	2	0	3	3	X	X	X	X	11

Sheet C	1	2	3	4	5	6	7	8	9	10	Final
United States (Dropkin)	1	1	0	2	0	0	3	1	X	X	8
Norway (Walstad) 🔨	0	0	1	0	0	2	0	0	X	X	3

Sheet D	1	2	3	4	5	6	7	8	9	10	Final
Canada (Dunstone)	0	1	0	0	0	2	2	2	0	0	7
Japan (Tanida) 🔨	2	0	0	2	0	0	0	0	1	0	5

Sheet E	1	2	3	4	5	6	7	8	9	10	Final
Russia (Arkhipov) 🔨	0	3	0	0	0	2	2	2	0	X	9
Spain (Vez)	1	0	2	0	2	0	0	0	1	X	6

=== Placement game ===
Wednesday, February 11, 9:00

Team	1	2	3	4	5	6	7	8	9	10	Final
United States (Dropkin)	1	2	1	0	2	2	0	1	0	X	9
Switzerland (Desbaillets) 🔨	0	0	0	2	0	0	2	0	1	X	5

Switzerland is eliminated from the curling tournament at the 2017 Winter Universiade.

=== Playoffs ===
Semifinals
1	Norway	4
4	Sweden	1
2	Russia	7
3	Great Britain	5

Gold Medal Game
1	Norway	7
2	Russia	6
Bronze Medal Game
4	Sweden	4
3	Great Britain	7

==== Semifinals ====
Thursday, February 12, 9:00

Team	1	2	3	4	5	6	7	8	9	10	Final
Norway (Walstad) 🔨	0	1	0	0	0	0	2	0	1	X	4
Sweden (Mabergs)	0	0	0	0	0	0	0	1	0	X	1

Team	1	2	3	4	5	6	7	8	9	10	Final
Russia (Arkhipov) 🔨	4	0	0	1	0	0	0	1	0	1	7
Great Britain (Smith)	0	1	1	0	0	1	0	0	2	0	5

==== Bronze Medal Game ====
Thursday, February 12, 16:00

Team	1	2	3	4	5	6	7	8	9	10	Final
Sweden (Mabergs)	0	0	0	1	0	2	0	0	1	X	4
Great Britain (Smith) 🔨	0	2	0	0	2	0	2	1	0	X	7

==== Gold Medal Game ====
Friday, February 13, 16:00

Team	1	2	3	4	5	6	7	8	9	10	11	Final
Norway (Walstad) 🔨	0	0	0	0	2	0	2	0	1	1	1	7
Russia (Arkhipov)	0	0	0	1	0	3	0	2	0	0	0	6

== Women ==
=== Teams ===
Canada	Great Britain	Japan	Norway	Russia
Skip: Breanne Meakin; Third: Lauren Horton; Second: Lynn Kreviazuk; Lead: Jessica Armstrong	Skip: Hazel Smith; Third: Laura Ritchie; Second: Rachael Halliday; Lead: Heather Morton; Alternate: Angharad Ward	Skip: Mayu Minami; Third: Mizuki Kitaguchi; Second: Mayu Natsuizaka; Lead: Mari Ikawa; Alternate: Kotomi Mochizuki	Skip: Pia Trulsen; Third: Julie Kjær Molnar; Second: Ingvild Ekeli Skaga; Lead: Stine Hålien	Skip: Anna Sidorova; Third: Margarita Fomina; Second: Alexandra Saitova; Lead: Ekaterina Galkina; Alternate: Victoria Moiseeva
South Korea	Spain	Sweden	Switzerland	United States
Skip: Kim Eun-jung; Third: Kim Kyeong-ae; Second: Kim Seon-yeong; Lead: Kim Yeong-mi	Skip: Patricia Arbues; Third: Alicia Munte; Second: Ane Cuadrado; Lead: Sofia Fernandez; Alternate: Macarena Garcia del Valle	Skip: Sara McManus; Third: Cecilia Östlund; Second: Anna Huhta; Lead: Sofia Mabergs	Skip: Michèle Jäggi; Third: Michelle Gribi; Second: Sina Wettstein; Lead: Nora Baumann; Alternate: Anita Jäggi	Skip: Hannah Ely; Third: Abbey Suslavich; Second: Emma Annand; Lead: Emily Walker; Alternate: Grace Gabower

=== Round-robin standings ===
Final round-robin standings

Key
Teams to Playoffs
Teams to Tiebreaker

Country	Skip	W	L
Canada	Breanne Meakin	9	0
Sweden	Sara McManus	7	2
Russia	Anna Sidorova	7	2
Switzerland	Michèle Jäggi	5	4
South Korea	Kim Eun-jung	5	4
Norway	Pia Trulsen	4	5
Great Britain	Hazel Smith	4	5
United States	Hannah Ely	3	6
Japan	Mayu Minami	1	8
Spain	Patricia Arbués	0	9

=== Round-robin results ===
==== Draw 1 ====
Thursday, February 5, 9:00

Sheet A	1	2	3	4	5	6	7	8	9	10	Final
United States (Ely)	0	1	0	2	0	0	0	0	X	X	3
Russia (Sidorova) 🔨	1	0	2	0	3	1	2	4	X	X	13

Sheet B	1	2	3	4	5	6	7	8	9	10	Final
Japan (Minami)	0	0	0	1	0	0	2	0	X	X	3
Switzerland (Jäggi) 🔨	2	0	0	0	3	4	0	1	X	X	10

Sheet C	1	2	3	4	5	6	7	8	9	10	Final
Canada (Meakin) 🔨	0	0	1	0	0	2	0	1	0	2	6
South Korea (Kim)	0	0	0	0	1	0	2	0	1	0	4

Sheet D	1	2	3	4	5	6	7	8	9	10	Final
Sweden (McManus) 🔨	0	5	1	2	2	4	X	X	X	X	14
Spain (Arbues)	1	0	0	0	0	0	X	X	X	X	1

Sheet E	1	2	3	4	5	6	7	8	9	10	Final
Great Britain (Smith) 🔨	0	0	3	0	2	1	0	0	2	0	8
Norway (Trulsen)	3	2	0	1	0	0	1	0	0	2	9

==== Draw 2 ====
Thursday, February 5, 19:00

Sheet A	1	2	3	4	5	6	7	8	9	10	Final
Switzerland (Jäggi)	0	0	0	1	0	0	2	0	X	X	3
Sweden (McManus) 🔨	0	1	3	0	1	2	0	1	X	X	8

Sheet B	1	2	3	4	5	6	7	8	9	10	Final
Russia (Sidorova) 🔨	6	5	6	1	0	4	X	X	X	X	22
Spain (Arbues)	0	0	0	0	1	0	X	X	X	X	1

Sheet C	1	2	3	4	5	6	7	8	9	10	Final
Great Britain (Smith) 🔨	0	0	0	1	1	0	0	0	X	X	2
United States (Ely)	1	3	1	0	0	1	1	1	X	X	8

Sheet D	1	2	3	4	5	6	7	8	9	10	Final
Norway (Trulsen)	0	2	0	0	0	0	1	0	X	X	3
South Korea (Kim) 🔨	2	0	1	1	1	1	0	3	X	X	9

Sheet E	1	2	3	4	5	6	7	8	9	10	Final
Japan (Minami)	0	0	0	0	1	0	0	1	0	X	2
Canada (Meakin) 🔨	2	0	0	0	0	2	2	0	4	X	10

==== Draw 3 ====
Friday, February 6, 14:00

Sheet A	1	2	3	4	5	6	7	8	9	10	Final
South Korea (Kim) 🔨	1	0	1	2	0	1	2	0	1	X	8
Japan (Minami)	0	0	0	0	1	0	0	2	0	X	3

Sheet B	1	2	3	4	5	6	7	8	9	10	Final
United States (Ely)	1	0	1	1	0	2	0	0	0	0	5
Norway (Trulsen) 🔨	0	3	0	0	2	0	0	1	0	2	8

Sheet C	1	2	3	4	5	6	7	8	9	10	Final
Russia (Sidorova)	0	2	0	1	0	1	0	1	X	X	5
Sweden (McManus) 🔨	3	0	2	0	3	0	1	0	X	X	9

Sheet D	1	2	3	4	5	6	7	8	9	10	Final
Canada (Meakin)	0	0	2	0	2	0	4	1	X	X	9
Great Britain (Smith) 🔨	0	0	0	1	0	1	0	0	X	X	2

Sheet E	1	2	3	4	5	6	7	8	9	10	Final
Switzerland (Jäggi)	2	3	2	1	4	0	2	X	X	X	14
Spain (Arbues) 🔨	0	0	0	0	0	1	0	X	X	X	1

==== Draw 4 ====
Saturday, February 7, 9:00

Sheet A	1	2	3	4	5	6	7	8	9	10	Final
Spain (Arbues)	2	0	0	0	0	0	1	0	X	X	3
Great Britain (Smith) 🔨	0	1	3	2	2	3	0	3	X	X	14

Sheet B	1	2	3	4	5	6	7	8	9	10	Final
Canada (Meakin) 🔨	2	0	1	0	2	0	4	X	X	X	9
Sweden (McManus)	0	1	0	1	0	1	0	X	X	X	3

Sheet C	1	2	3	4	5	6	7	8	9	10	Final
Norway (Trulsen)	0	0	0	0	2	1	0	0	2	0	5
Switzerland (Jäggi) 🔨	2	1	1	1	0	0	0	1	0	1	7

Sheet D	1	2	3	4	5	6	7	8	9	10	Final
South Korea (Kim) 🔨	2	1	0	0	2	2	X	X	X	X	7
United States (Ely)	0	0	1	0	0	0	X	X	X	X	1

Sheet E	1	2	3	4	5	6	7	8	9	10	Final
Russia (Sidorova) 🔨	0	3	2	3	0	1	2	X	X	X	11
Japan (Minami)	1	0	0	0	1	0	0	X	X	X	2

==== Draw 5 ====
Saturday, February 7, 19:00

Sheet A	1	2	3	4	5	6	7	8	9	10	Final
Canada (Meakin)	0	1	0	0	2	0	2	0	0	1	6
Switzerland (Jäggi) 🔨	0	0	1	0	0	1	0	1	1	0	4

Sheet B	1	2	3	4	5	6	7	8	9	10	Final
Great Britain (Smith)	0	0	1	0	2	0	1	X	X	X	4
Russia (Sidorova) 🔨	3	3	0	2	0	2	0	X	X	X	10

Sheet C	1	2	3	4	5	6	7	8	9	10	Final
United States (Ely) 🔨	0	2	2	0	3	2	1	X	X	X	10
Spain (Arbues)	1	0	0	0	0	0	0	X	X	X	1

Sheet D	1	2	3	4	5	6	7	8	9	10	Final
Japan (Minami) 🔨	0	0	1	0	1	1	0	0	X	X	3
Norway (Trulsen)	2	2	0	1	0	0	2	2	X	X	9

Sheet E	1	2	3	4	5	6	7	8	9	10	Final
Sweden (McManus) 🔨	0	1	0	1	3	1	0	1	X	X	7
South Korea (Kim)	0	0	2	0	0	0	1	0	X	X	3

==== Draw 6 ====
Sunday, February 8, 14:00

Sheet A	1	2	3	4	5	6	7	8	9	10	Final
Great Britain (Smith)	2	0	1	1	0	3	1	X	X	X	8
South Korea (Kim) 🔨	0	1	0	0	1	0	0	X	X	X	2

Sheet B	1	2	3	4	5	6	7	8	9	10	Final
Switzerland (Jäggi) 🔨	0	0	3	0	0	0	2	0	1	X	6
United States (Ely)	0	1	0	0	0	1	0	2	0	X	4

Sheet C	1	2	3	4	5	6	7	8	9	10	Final
Sweden (McManus)	0	0	4	0	2	0	2	0	0	0	8
Japan (Minami) 🔨	1	1	0	1	0	1	0	1	1	1	7

Sheet D	1	2	3	4	5	6	7	8	9	10	Final
Spain (Arbues)	0	2	0	0	0	0	X	X	X	X	2
Canada (Meakin) 🔨	3	0	5	2	4	2	X	X	X	X	16

Sheet E	1	2	3	4	5	6	7	8	9	10	Final
Norway (Trulsen) 🔨	0	0	0	0	2	0	X	X	X	X	2
Russia (Sidorova)	1	1	3	2	0	5	X	X	X	X	12

==== Draw 7 ====
Monday, February 9, 9:00

Sheet A	1	2	3	4	5	6	7	8	9	10	Final
Japan (Minami) 🔨	4	0	4	2	1	0	0	3	X	X	14
Spain (Arbues)	0	2	0	0	0	0	0	0	X	X	2

Sheet B	1	2	3	4	5	6	7	8	9	10	11	Final
Norway (Trulsen) 🔨	3	0	0	1	0	0	0	0	2	1	0	7
Canada (Meakin)	0	2	1	0	1	1	1	1	0	0	1	8

Sheet C	1	2	3	4	5	6	7	8	9	10	Final
South Korea (Kim)	0	1	0	0	1	0	2	0	0	X	4
Russia (Sidorova) 🔨	2	0	0	1	0	2	0	1	1	X	7

Sheet D	1	2	3	4	5	6	7	8	9	10	Final
Great Britain (Smith)	0	0	2	0	1	0	0	1	0	0	4
Switzerland (Jäggi) 🔨	1	0	0	1	0	1	1	0	0	1	5

Sheet E	1	2	3	4	5	6	7	8	9	10	Final
United States (Ely) 🔨	0	0	1	0	0	0	X	X	X	X	1
Sweden (McManus)	1	2	0	3	2	4	X	X	X	X	12

==== Draw 8 ====
Monday, February 9, 19:00

Sheet A	1	2	3	4	5	6	7	8	9	10	Final
Russia (Sidorova) 🔨	1	0	2	0	0	0	2	0	2	0	7
Canada (Meakin)	0	1	0	2	1	2	0	2	0	1	9

Sheet B	1	2	3	4	5	6	7	8	9	10	Final
Sweden (McManus) 🔨	0	0	2	1	0	1	0	2	0	0	6
Great Britain (Smith)	0	1	0	0	1	0	3	0	1	2	8

Sheet C	1	2	3	4	5	6	7	8	9	10	Final
Spain (Arbues)	0	0	0	0	0	0	X	X	X	X	0
Norway (Trulsen) 🔨	1	2	2	3	3	2	X	X	X	X	13

Sheet D	1	2	3	4	5	6	7	8	9	10	11	Final
United States (Ely)	0	1	0	3	0	0	0	2	0	1	1	8
Japan (Minami) 🔨	2	0	2	0	2	0	0	0	1	0	0	7

Sheet E	1	2	3	4	5	6	7	8	9	10	Final
South Korea (Kim) 🔨	0	0	2	0	1	0	1	0	1	1	6
Switzerland (Jäggi)	1	0	0	2	0	1	0	1	0	0	5

==== Draw 9 ====
Tuesday, February 10, 14:00

Sheet A	1	2	3	4	5	6	7	8	9	10	Final
Sweden (McManus)	0	0	0	3	4	0	2	0	0	1	10
Norway (Trulsen) 🔨	0	3	2	0	0	1	0	1	1	0	8

Sheet B	1	2	3	4	5	6	7	8	9	10	Final
Spain (Arbues)	0	0	1	0	0	1	X	X	X	X	2
South Korea (Kim) 🔨	3	2	0	3	1	0	X	X	X	X	9

Sheet C	1	2	3	4	5	6	7	8	9	10	Final
Japan (Minami) 🔨	1	0	0	0	1	0	0	0	0	X	2
Great Britain (Smith)	0	1	1	0	0	0	0	3	1	X	6

Sheet D	1	2	3	4	5	6	7	8	9	10	Final
Switzerland (Jäggi)	0	0	0	1	0	1	0	0	0	X	2
Russia (Sidorova) 🔨	1	1	0	0	2	0	1	1	1	X	7

Sheet E	1	2	3	4	5	6	7	8	9	10	Final
Canada (Meakin)	0	2	2	0	1	1	0	5	X	X	11
United States (Ely) 🔨	2	0	0	1	0	0	1	0	X	X	4

=== Tiebreaker ===
Wednesday, February 11, 9:00

Team	1	2	3	4	5	6	7	8	9	10	Final
Switzerland (Jäggi)	0	0	0	0	2	1	0	1	1	1	6
South Korea (Kim) 🔨	0	0	1	1	0	0	2	0	0	0	4

=== Playoffs ===
Semifinals
1	Canada	8
4	Switzerland	3
2	Sweden	4
3	Russia	10

Gold Medal Game
1	Canada	8
3	Russia	9
Bronze Medal Game
4	Switzerland	8
2	Sweden	7

==== Semifinals ====
Thursday, February 12, 9:00

Team	1	2	3	4	5	6	7	8	9	10	Final
Canada (Meakin) 🔨	0	0	0	0	2	3	0	1	2	X	8
Switzerland (Jäggi)	0	1	1	0	0	0	1	0	0	X	3

Team	1	2	3	4	5	6	7	8	9	10	Final
Sweden (McManus) 🔨	1	0	0	0	0	2	0	1	X	X	4
Russia (Sidorova)	0	3	1	1	3	0	2	0	X	X	10

==== Bronze Medal Game ====
Thursday, February 12, 16:00

Sheet B	1	2	3	4	5	6	7	8	9	10	Final
Switzerland (Jäggi)	0	1	1	0	1	0	3	0	0	2	8
Sweden (McManus) 🔨	1	0	0	1	0	2	0	1	2	0	7

==== Gold Medal Game ====
Friday, February 13, 9:00

Sheet C	1	2	3	4	5	6	7	8	9	10	11	Final
Canada (Meakin) 🔨	0	2	3	0	1	0	1	0	0	1	0	8
Russia (Sidorova)	1	0	0	1	0	3	0	2	1	0	1	9
