= Mats O. Nyberg =

Swedish curler and coach

Mats Nyberg
- Curler ♂
- Born: 5 September 1958 (age 68); Sollefteå

Team
- Curling club: Magnus Ladulås CK, Stockholm, Stocksunds CK, Stockholm

Curling career
- Member Association: Sweden
- World Championship: 1 (2008)
- Other appearances: World Senior Championships: 1 (2011)
Medal record
Curling

Mats Olof Håkan Nyberg (born 5 September 1958 in Sollefteå) is a Swedish curler and curling coach.

== Teams ==
Season	Skip	Third	Second	Lead	Alternate	Coach	Events
2007–08	Anders Kraupp	Peder Folke	Björn Brandberg	Anton Sandström	Mats Nyberg	Stefan Hasselborg	WCC 2008 (10th)
2010–11	Per Carlsén	Mats Nyberg	Stefan Larsson	Dan Carlsén	Claes-Göran Höglund	Fredrik Carlsén	WSCC 2011 (10th)

== Record as a coach of national teams ==
Year	Tournament, event	National team	Place
2000	2000 World Men's Curling Championship	Sweden (men)	2nd place, silver medalist(s)
2001	2001 World Men's Curling Championship	Sweden (men)	1st place, gold medalist(s)
2002	2002 Winter Olympics	Sweden (men)	4
