= Eirik Mjøen =

Norwegian curler

- Curler ♂
- Born: 16 September 1992 (age 34); Oppdal, Norway

Team
- Curling club: Oppdal CK, Oppdal

Curling career
- Member Association: Norway
- World Championship: 1 (2021)
- World Junior Curling Championship: 4 (2011, 2012, 2013, 2014)
- Other appearances: Winter World University Games: 1 (2015)
Medal record
Curling
Winter World Universiade
Gold medal – first place	2015 Granada
Norwegian Men's Curling Championship
Silver medal – second place	2014 Trondheim
Silver medal – second place	2015 ...
Bronze medal – third place	2016 Stavanger

Eirik Mjøen (born 16 September 1992 in Oppdal) is a Norwegian male curler from Trondheim.

At the international level, he is a 2015 Winter Universiade champion curler and two-time World junior championships bronze medalist.

At the national level, he is a Norwegian men's championship silver and bronze medalist.

== Teams and events ==
=== Men's ===
Season	Skip	Third	Second	Lead	Alternate	Coach	Events
2010–11	Steffen Mellemseter	Markus Høiberg	Magnus Nedregotten	Sander Rølvåg	Eirik Mjøen	Stig Høiberg	WJCC 2011 (bronze)
2011–12	Markus Høiberg	Magnus Nedregotten	Sebastian Mellemseter	Sander Rølvåg	Eirik Mjøen	Stig Høiberg	WJCC 2012 (4th)
2012–13	Eirik Mjøen	Martin Sesaker	Willhelm Næss	Markus Skogvold	Gaute Nepstad	Ole Ingvaldsen	WJCC 2013 (5th)
2013–14	Eirik Mjøen	Markus Skogvold	Martin Sesaker	Willhelm Næss	Gaute Nepstad	Stein Mellemseter (WJCC)	WJCC 2014 (bronze); NMCC 2014 (silver)
2014–15	Steffen Walstad	Eirik Mjøen	Magnus Nedregotten	Sander Rølvåg		Ole Ingvaldsen	WUG 2015 (gold)
2014–15	Steffen Walstad	Eirik Mjøen	Sander Rølvåg	Frode Tobias Bjerke			NMCC 2015 (silver)
2015–16	Eirik Mjøen	Sander Rølvåg	Martin Sesaker	Markus Skogvold			NMCC 2016 (bronze)
2016–17	Eirik Mjøen	Sander Rølvåg	Martin Sesaker	Markus Skogvold			NMCC 2017 (4th)
2017–18	Steffen Mellemseter	Willhelm Næss	Martin Sesaker	Harald Skarsheim Rian	Eirik Mjøen		NMCC 2018 (6th)
2019–20	Steffen Mellemseter	Willhelm Næss	Harald Skarsheim Rian	Eirik Mjøen	Jørgen Myran		NMCC 2020 (5th)
2020–21	Steffen Walstad	Torger Nergård	Markus Høiberg	Magnus Vågberg	Eirik Mjøen	Thomas Løvold	WCC 2021 (8th)
2022–23	Steffen Mellemseter	Kristian Rolvsjord	Eirik Mjøen	Truls Rolvsjord	Sondre Snøve Høiberg		NMCC 2023 (6th)

== Personal life ==
As of 2021, Eirik Mjøen was a construction site manager.

He is married, and has two children.

He started curling in 2001 at the age of 9.
