= Steffen Mellemseter =

Norwegian curler

- Curler ♂
- Born: 26 July 1989 (age 37); Oppdal Municipality, Norway

Team
- Curling club: Oppdal CK, Oppdal

Curling career
- Member Association: Norway
- World Championship: 1 (2018)
- European Championship: 1 (2018)
- Other appearances: World Junior Championships: 5 (2007, 2008, 2009, 2010, 2011)
Medal record
Curling
Norwegian Men's Championship
Silver medal – second place	2013
Bronze medal – third place	2014
World Junior Championships
Bronze medal – third place	2011 Perth

Steffen R. Mellemseter (born 26 June 1989 in Oppdal Municipality) is a Norwegian curler.

== Teams ==
Season	Skip	Third	Second	Lead	Alternate	Coach	Events
2006–07	Stein Fredrik Mellemseter	Steffen Mellemseter	Kristian Rolvsjord	Markus Høiberg	Øyvind Rogstad	Paul Enger	WJCC 2007 (7th)
2007–08	Kristian Rolvsjord	Steffen Walstad	Steffen Mellemseter	Markus Høiberg	Joacim Suther	Paul Enger	WJCC 2008 (4th)
2008–09	Kristian Rolvsjord	Steffen Walstad	Steffen Mellemseter	Markus Høiberg	Joacim Suther; Frode Bjerke (WJCC)	Stig Høiberg	WJCC 2009 (5th)
2009–10	Markus Høiberg (fourth)	Steffen Mellemseter (skip)	Steffen Walstad	Anders Bjoergum; Magnus Nedregotten (WJCC)	Truls Rolvsjord	Stig Høiberg	WJCC 2010 (5th)
2010–11	Steffen Mellemseter	Markus Snøve Høiberg	Magnus Nedregotten	Sander Rølvåg	Eirik Mjøen	Stig Høiberg	WJCC 2011 (bronze)
2011–12	Steffen Mellemseter	Markus Snøve Høiberg	Haavard Mellem	Magnus Nedregotten	Stein Mellemseter		
2012–13	Steffen Mellemseter	Steffen Walstad	Haavard Mellem	Magnus Nedregotten	Stein Mellemseter		NMCC 2013 (silver)
2013–14	Markus Høiberg	Steffen Walstad	Magnus Nedregotten	Sander Rølvåg	Steffen Mellemseter		NMCC 2014 (bronze)
2016–17	Stig Høiberg	Steffen Mellemseter	Anders Bjørgum	Willhelm Næss	Sondre Snøve Høiberg		NMCC 2017 (14th)
2017–18	Steffen Mellemseter	Willhelm Næss	Martin Sesaker	Harald Skarsheim Rian	Eirik Mjøen		NMCC 2018 (6th)
2017–18	Steffen Walstad	Markus Høiberg	Magnus Nedregotten	Magnus Trulsen Vågberg	Steffen Mellemseter	Thomas Løvold	WCC 2018 (5th)
2018–19	Steffen Walstad	Markus Høiberg	Magnus Nedregotten	Magnus Vågberg	Steffen Mellemseter	Thomas Løvold	ECC 2018 (5th)
2018–19	Steffen Mellemseter	Willhelm Næss	Harald Skarsheim Rian	Sander Rølvåg	Martin Sesaker		NMCC 2019 (13th)
2019–20	Steffen Mellemseter	Eirik Mjøen	Willhelm Næss	Harald Skarsheim Rian			
