= Anders Kraupp =

Swedish male curler and coach

- Curler ♂
- Born: 3 September 1959 (age 67); Stockholm, Sweden

Team
- Curling club: Sundbybergs CK, Sundbyberg, Stocksunds CK, Stockholm

Curling career
- Member Association: Sweden
- World Championship: 3 (2001, 2004, 2008)
- World Mixed Doubles Championship: 1 (2011)
- European Championship: 6 (2000, 2001, 2002, 2003, 2004, 2005)
- Olympic: 2: (2002, 2006)
- Other appearances: World Senior Curling Championships: 1 (2015), European Mixed Curling Championship: 1 (2007)
Medal record
Curling
World Championships
Gold medal – first place	2001 Lausanne
Gold medal – first place	2004 Gävle
European Championships
Gold medal – first place	2001 Vierumäki
Silver medal – second place	2002 Grindelwald
Silver medal – second place	2003 Courmayeur
Silver medal – second place	2004 Sofia
Silver medal – second place	2005 Garmisch-Partenkirchen
Swedish Mixed Championship
Gold medal – first place	2007
Russian Mixed Championship
Gold medal – first place	2013
Swedish Mixed Doubles Championship
Gold medal – first place	2011

Anders Kraupp (born 3 September 1959 in Stockholm, Sweden) is a Swedish curler and curling coach. He competed at two Winter Olympics (2002, 2006).

In 2013 he was inducted into the Swedish Curling Hall of Fame.

== Teams ==
=== Men's ===
Season	Skip	Third	Second	Lead	Alternate	Events
2000–01	Peja Lindholm	Tomas Nordin	Magnus Swartling	Peter Narup	Anders Kraupp	ECC 2000 (bronze); WCC 2001 (gold)
2001–02	Peja Lindholm	Tomas Nordin	Magnus Swartling	Peter Narup	Anders Kraupp	ECC 2001 (gold); OG 2002 (4th)
2002–03	Peja Lindholm	Tomas Nordin	Magnus Swartling	Peter Narup	Anders Kraupp	ECC 2002 (silver)
2003–04	Peja Lindholm	Tomas Nordin	Magnus Swartling	Peter Narup	Anders Kraupp	ECC 2003 (silver); WCC 2004 (gold)
2004–05	Peja Lindholm	Tomas Nordin	Magnus Swartling	Peter Narup	Anders Kraupp	ECC 2004 (silver)
2005–06	Peja Lindholm	Tomas Nordin	Magnus Swartling	Peter Narup	Anders Kraupp	ECC 2005 (silver); OG 2006 (8th)
2006–07	Anders Kraupp	Per Sodergren	Peter Eriksson	Anton Sandström		
2007–08	Anders Kraupp	Peder Folke	Björn Brandberg	Anton Sandström	Mats Nyberg	WCC 2008 (10th)
2008–09	Anders Kraupp	Peder Folke	Anders Hammarstrom	Anton Sandström		
2014–15	Peter Tedenbäck	Rolf Wikström	Mats Jansson	Mikael Vilenius	Anders Kraupp	SMCC 2015 (10th)
2015	Anders Westerberg	Rickard Bergqvist	Claes Gunnarsson	Lars Ahlberg	Anders Kraupp	WSCC 2015 (5th)
2018–19	Anders Kraupp	Mikael Vilenius	Peter Tedenbäck	Rolf Wikström	Mats Jansson	SMCC 2019 (5th)

=== Mixed ===
Season	Skip	Third	Second	Lead	Alternate	Events
2007–08	Anders Kraupp	Åsa Häggman	Magnus Nilsson	Linda Kjerr		SMxCC 2007 (gold); EMxCC 2007 (15th)
2013	Anders Kraupp	Vita Moiseeva	Aleksandr Orlov	Maria Duyunova	Vladislav Goncharenko	RMxCC 2013 (gold)

=== Mixed doubles ===
Season	Male	Third	Female
2011	Anders Kraupp	Sabina Kraupp	SMDCC 2011 (gold); WMDCC 2011 (4th)

== Record as a coach of national teams ==
Year	Tournament, event	National team	Place
2010	2010 European Curling Championships	Greece (men)	25
2013	2013 World Junior Curling Championships	Russia (junior women)	1st place, gold medalist(s)
2014	2014 World Junior Curling Championships	Russia (junior women)	3rd place, bronze medalist(s)
2015	2015 World Junior Curling Championships	Russia (junior women)	7
2016	2016 World Mixed Doubles Curling Championship	Brazil (mixed doubles)	29

== Personal life ==
Anders is from a curling family; his son Sebastian (born in 1985) won the world men's championship in 2013 and his daughter Sabina (born in 1986) is a European mixed bronze medallist from 2008.

He started playing curling in 1978 when he was 19 years old.
