= Peder Folke =

Swedish male curler and coach

- Curler ♂
- Born: 8 April 1987 (age 39)

Team
- Curling club: Stocksunds CK, Stockholm

Curling career
- Member Association: Sweden
- World Championship: 1 (2008)
Medal record
Curling
Swedish Men's Championship
Silver medal – second place	2011
Gold medal – first place	2012
Bronze medal – third place	2013
Bronze medal – third place	2014
Bronze medal – third place	2016

Peder Langenskiöld Folke (born 8 April 1987) is a Swedish curler and curling coach.

He is a 2012 Swedish men's champion and competed in the 2008 World men's championship.

== Teams ==
Season	Skip	Third	Second	Lead	Alternate	Coach	Events
2005–06	Björn Brandberg	Peder Folke	Olof Esbjoernsson	Axel Ostersund			
2007–08	Anders Kraupp	Peder Folke	Björn Brandberg	Anton Sandström	Mats Nyberg	Stefan Hasselborg	WCC 2008 (10th)
2008–09	Anders Kraupp	Peder Folke	Anders Hammarstrom	Anton Sandström			
2009–10	Göran Carlsson	Peder Folke	Marcus Hasselborg	Anton Sandström			
2010–11	Marcus Hasselborg	Peder Folke	Göran Carlsson	Anton Sandström			SMCC 2011 (silver)
2011–12	Marcus Hasselborg	Peder Folke	Andreas Prytz	Anton Sandström			SMCC 2012 (gold)
2012–13	Marcus Hasselborg	Peder Folke	Andreas Prytz	Anton Sandström			SMCC 2013 (bronze)
2013–14	Marcus Hasselborg	Peder Folke	Andreas Prytz	Anton Sandström	Fredrik Nyman		SMCC 2014 (bronze)
2015–16	Marcus Hasselborg	Sebastian Kraupp	Vincent Stenberg	Anton Sandström	Peder Folke		SMCC 2016 (bronze)

== Record as a coach of national teams ==
Year	Tournament, event	National team	Place
2011	2011 World Mixed Doubles Curling Championship	Sweden (mixed doubles)	4

== Personal life ==
He is a management consultant and entrepreneur.
