= Anton Sandström =

Swedish male curler

- Curler ♂
- Born: 23 December 1981 (age 44)

Team
- Curling club: Stocksunds CK, Stockholm

Curling career
- Member Association: Sweden
- World Championship: 1 (2008)
Medal record
Curling
Swedish Men's Championship
Gold medal – first place	2012
Bronze medal – third place	2013
Bronze medal – third place	2014
Bronze medal – third place	2016

Karl Anton Sandström (born 23 December 1981) is a Swedish curler.

He is a 2012 Swedish men's champion and competed in the 2008 World men's championship.

== Teams ==
Season	Skip	Third	Second	Lead	Alternate	Coach	Events
2005–06	Peter Eriksson	Anders Kraupp	Christer Rickman	Anton Sandström			
2006–07	Anders Kraupp	Per Sodergren	Peter Eriksson	Anton Sandström			
2007–08	Anders Kraupp	Peder Folke	Björn Brandberg	Anton Sandström	Mats Nyberg	Stefan Hasselborg	WCC 2008 (10th)
2008–09	Anders Kraupp	Peder Folke	Anders Hammarstrom	Anton Sandström			
2009–10	Göran Carlsson	Marcus Hasselborg	Peder Folke	Anton Sandström			
2010–11	Marcus Hasselborg	Peder Folke	Göran Carlsson	Anton Sandström			
2011–12	Marcus Hasselborg	Peder Folke	Andreas Prytz	Anton Sandström			SMCC 2012 (gold)
2012–13	Marcus Hasselborg	Peder Folke	Andreas Prytz	Anton Sandström			SMCC 2013 (bronze)
2013–14	Marcus Hasselborg	Peder Folke	Andreas Prytz	Anton Sandström	Fredrik Nyman		SMCC 2014 (bronze)
2014–15	Marcus Hasselborg	Vincent Stenberg	Fredrik Nyman	Anton Sandström			SMCC 2015 (5th)
2015–16	Marcus Hasselborg	Sebastian Kraupp	Vincent Stenberg	Peder Folke	Anton Sandström		SMCC 2016 (bronze)
