= Sander Rølvåg =

Norwegian curler

- Curler

Curling career
- World Championship: 1 (2017)
- European Championship: 4 (2014, 2015, 2016, 2017)
Medal record
Men's curling
Representing Norway
Winter Universiade
Gold medal – first place	2015 Granada
Bronze medal – third place	2017 Almaty
World Mixed Curling Championship
Gold medal – first place	2015 Bern
European Curling Championships
Silver medal – second place	2016 Renfrewshire
Silver medal – second place	2014 Champéry
Bronze medal – third place	2015 Esbjerg
European Youth Olympic Festival
Gold medal – first place	2009 Silesia
World Junior Curling Championships
Bronze medal – third place	2011 Perth

Sander Olav Rølvåg (born 4 August 1990 in Sandnessjøen, Norway) is a Norwegian curler from Oslo.

== Career ==
Rølvåg represented Norway as a skip at the biennial European Youth Olympic Festival in 2009, winning bronze. In 2011 he was a part of the team that secured a bronze medal at the 2011 World Junior Curling Championships. Rølvåg has represented Norway at the European Curling Championships as an alternate on two occasions, in the 2014 European Curling Championships and the 2015 European Curling Championships. In 2015 he won the gold medal at the 2015 Winter Universiade and won the inaugural 2015 World Mixed Curling Championship.

== Honours ==
2012 World Junior Curling Championships Sportsmanship Award

== Personal life ==
Rølvåg is employed as a curling instructor, icemaker and commentator.
